= 2023–24 Segunda Federación =

Segunda Federación
- Season: 2023–24
- Dates: 2 September 2023 – 2 June 2024
- Promoted: Barakaldo; Betis Deportivo; Bilbao Athletic; Gimnástica Segoviana; Hércules; Marbella; Ourense; Sevilla Atlético; Yeclano; Zamora
- Relegated: Arandina; Atlético Saguntino; Badajoz; Brea; Cartagena B Cayón; Cerdanyola del Vallès; Covadonga; El Palo; Formentera; La Nucía; Llerenense; Manchego; Manresa; Mensajero; Montijo; Mutilvera; Náxara; Oviedo Vetusta; Penya Independent; Racing Cartagena Mar Menor; Racing Villalbés; San Fernando; San Juan; San Roque Lepe; Valle de Egüés; Vélez
- Top goalscorer: Urko Izeta (24 goals)

The 2023–24 Segunda Federación season is the third for the Segunda Federación, the fourth-highest level in the Spanish football league system. Ninety teams participated, divided into five groups of eighteen clubs each based on geographical proximity. In each group, the champions automatically promoted to Primera Federación, and the second to fifth placers will play promotion play-offs. The last five teams in each group will be relegated to the Tercera Federación; in addition, the four worst teams classified 13th in their group will contest play-offs to define the last two relegation places.

== Overview before the season ==
A total of 90 teams joined the league: ten relegated from the 2022–23 Primera Federación, 53 retained from the 2022–23 Segunda Federación and 27 promoted from the 2022–23 Tercera Federación.

Teams relegated from 2022–23 Primera Federación

- Badajoz
- Bilbao Athletic
- Calahorra
- Linense
- La Nucía
- UD Logroñés
- Numancia
- Pontevedra
- San Sebastián de los Reyes
- Talavera de la Reina

Teams retained from 2022–23 Segunda Federación

- Alavés B
- Alzira
- Arenas
- Atlético Paso
- Atlético Saguntino
- Avilés Industrial
- Badalona Futur
- Betis Deportivo
- Brea
- Cacereño
- Cádiz B
- Cartagena B
- Cerdanyola del Vallès
- Compostela
- Coruxo
- Deportivo Aragón
- Espanyol B
- Estepona
- Formentera
- Gernika
- Guadalajara
- Gimnástica Segoviana
- Gimnástica Torrelavega
- Guijuelo
- Hércules
- Izarra
- Langreo
- Lleida Esportiu
- Marino Luanco
- Mar Menor
- Manresa
- Montijo
- Mutilvera
- Navalcarnero
- Ourense CF
- Oviedo Vetusta
- Peña Deportiva
- Rayo Cantabria
- Real Sociedad C
- San Juan
- San Roque Lepe
- Sevilla Atlético
- Terrassa
- Tudelano
- UCAM Murcia
- Unión Adarve
- Utebo
- Valencia Mestalla
- Valladolid Promesas
- Vélez
- Vilanovense
- Yeclano
- Zamora

Teams promoted from 2022–23 Tercera Federación

- Águilas
- Andratx
- Atlético Antoniano
- Arandina
- Barakaldo
- Barbastro
- Cayón
- Covadonga
- Deportivo Fabril
- El Palo
- Europa
- Getafe B
- Illescas
- La Unión Atlético
- Llerenense
- Manchego Ciudad Real
- Marbella
- Mensajero
- Náxara
- Orihuela
- Penya Independent
- Racing Villalbés
- Sant Andreu
- San Fernando
- Torrent
- Ursaria
- Valle de Egüés

== Groups ==
=== Group 1 ===
Location of teams in 2023–24 Segunda Federación – Group 1

==== Teams and locations ====
Team	Home city	Stadium	Capacity
Arandina	Aranda de Duero	El Montecillo	6,000
Avilés Industrial	Avilés	Román Suárez Puerta	5,400
Cayón	Sarón	Fernando Astobiza	2,700
Compostela	Santiago de Compostela	Vero Boquete	16,666
Coruxo	Vigo	O Vao	2,200
Covadonga	Oviedo	Juan Antonio Álvarez Rabanal	2,000
Deportivo Fabril	Abegondo	Cidade Deportiva de Abegondo	1,000
Gimnástica Torrelavega	Torrelavega	El Malecón	6,007
Guijuelo	Guijuelo	Municipal de Guijuelo	1,500
Langreo	Langreo	Ganzábal	4,024
Marino Luanco	Luanco	Miramar	3,500
Ourense CF	Ourense	O Couto	5,659
Oviedo Vetusta	Oviedo	El Requexón	3,000
Pontevedra	Pontevedra	Pasarón	12,000
Racing Villalbés	Vilalba	A Magdalena	2,000
Rayo Cantabria	Santander	La Albericia	600
Valladolid Promesas	Valladolid	Anexos José Zorrilla	1,500
Zamora	Zamora	Ruta de la Plata	7,813

==== Personnel and sponsorship ====
Team	Manager	Captain	Kit manufacturer	Shirt main sponsor
Arandina	(Spain) Alejandro Izquierdo	(Spain) Zazu	Hummel	Leche Pascual
Avilés Industrial	(Spain) Manolo Sánchez	(Spain) Natalio	Noone Fútbol	BMW Triocar
Cayón	(Spain) Luis Fernández	(Spain) Carlos Cagigas	Sukan	Grupo Mercantil Hermanos Laredo
Compostela	(Spain) Antón Permuy	(Spain) Samu Rodríguez	Adidas	Lenovo
Coruxo	(Spain) David de Dios	(Spain) Andriu	Zico	Concello de Vigo
Covadonga	(Spain) David González	(Spain) Vicente Álvarez	Adidas	Lurpelan
Deportivo Fabril	(Spain) Óscar Gilsanz	(Spain) Álex Barba	Kappa	Estrella Galicia
Gimnástica Torrelavega	(Spain) Fran Martín	(Spain) Raúl Chamorro	Adidas	La Oriental Sin Gluten
Guijuelo	(Spain) Mario Sánchez	(Spain) Cristóbal Gil	Erreà	El Navazo SL
Langreo	(Spain) Javi Vázquez	(Spain) Adrián Torre	Adidas	QuaZZartech, PJR Gestión Promotora
Marino Luanco	(Spain) Sergio Sánchez	(Spain) Guaya	Deporte Asturiano	Posada Organización
Ourense CF	(Spain) Rubén Domínguez	(Spain) Daniel Portela	Cool Sport	Centro Médico El Carmen, Xunta de Galicia
Oviedo Vetusta	(Spain) Roberto Aguirre	(Spain) Lucas Laso	Adidas	Digi
Pontevedra	(Spain) Yago Iglesias	(Spain) Álex González	Hummel	Deputación de Pontevedra
Racing Villalbés	(Spain) Simón Lamas	(Spain) Diego López	Zico	Président
Rayo Cantabria	(Spain) Ezequiel Loza	(Spain) Germán	Austral	Plenitude
Valladolid Promesas	(Spain) Álvaro Rubio	(Spain) Adri Gómez	Kappa	Estrella Galicia
Zamora	(Spain) David Movilla	(Spain) Dani Hernández	BKA Sport	Estrella Galicia

==== League table ====
Pos	Team	Pld	W	D	L	GF	GA	GD	Pts	Qualification
1	Ourense CF (C, P)	34	21	10	3	54	19	+35	73	Promotion to Primera Federación and qualification to Copa del Rey
2	Pontevedra	34	19	11	4	69	31	+38	68	Qualification for the promotion play-offs and Copa del Rey
3	Zamora (P)	34	17	12	5	42	21	+21	63	Qualification for the promotion play-offs and Copa del Rey
4	Guijuelo	34	14	9	11	36	34	+2	51 (Note: Guijuelo finished ahead of Rayo Cantabria on head-to-head points: Guijuelo 2–1 Rayo Cantabria, Rayo Cantabria 1–2 Guijuelo)	Qualification for the promotion play-offs and Copa del Rey
5	Rayo Cantabria	34	13	12	9	50	41	+9	51	Qualification for the promotion play-offs
6	Langreo	34	12	14	8	32	40	−8	50	Qualification for the Copa del Rey
7	Compostela	34	13	8	13	35	38	−3	47 (Note: Compostela finished ahead of Valladolid Promesas on head-to-head goal difference: Compostela 4–1 Valladolid Promesas, Valladolid Promesas 2–0 Compostela)	
8	Valladolid Promesas	34	13	8	13	47	52	−5	47	
9	Deportivo Fabril	34	11	11	12	48	47	+1	44	
10	Coruxo	34	12	7	15	36	48	−12	43	
11	Marino Luanco	34	9	15	10	29	24	+5	42	
12	Gimnástica Torrelavega	34	11	8	15	41	50	−9	41 (Note: Gimnástica Torrelavega finished ahead of Avilés Industrial on head-to-head points: Avilés Industrial 0–1 Gimnástica Torrelavega, Gimnástica Torrelavega 1–1 Avilés Industrial)	
13	Avilés Industrial (O)	34	9	14	11	40	38	+2	41	Qualification for the relegation play-offs
14	Racing Villalbés (R)	34	8	13	13	23	32	−9	37	Relegation to Tercera Federación
15	Arandina (R)	34	8	10	16	37	48	−11	34	Relegation to Tercera Federación
16	Oviedo Vetusta (R)	34	6	12	16	27	43	−16	30 (Note: Oviedo Vetusta finished ahead of Cayón on head-to-head points: Oviedo Vetusta 1–0 Cayón, Cayón 0–1 Oviedo Vetusta)	Relegation to Tercera Federación
17	Cayón (R)	34	6	12	16	37	52	−15	30	Relegation to Tercera Federación
18	Covadonga (R)	34	7	8	19	35	60	−25	29	Relegation to Tercera Federación

Updated to match(es) played on 5 May 2024. Source:
Rules for classification: 1) points; 2) head-to-head points; 3) head-to-head goal difference; 4) goal difference; 5) number of goals scored
(C) Champions; (O) Play-off winners; (P) Promoted; (R) Relegated

==== Results ====
Home \ Away	ARA	AVI	CAY	COM	COR	COV	FAB	GIM	GUI	LAN	MAR	OUR	OVI	PON	RVI	RCA	VLD	ZAM
Arandina	—	2–1	1–1	0–0	0–1	2–1	2–2	2–3	0–1	2–0	2–1	0–0	1–1	1–1	0–1	1–1	1–2	0–0
Avilés Industrial	2–1	—	1–1	2–1	4–0	3–1	2–2	0–1	2–2	2–2	1–1	0–2	2–0	1–1	1–0	1–2	1–1	0–1
Cayón	1–1	0–0	—	4–0	2–1	3–1	3–2	1–2	1–2	1–2	1–1	1–3	0–1	1–1	3–0	1–1	3–2	0–1
Compostela	4–2	3–1	2–0	—	1–0	2–0	1–0	1–1	1–0	0–1	0–2	0–1	1–0	2–2	0–2	3–1	4–1	0–1
Coruxo	1–0	1–1	0–0	0–0	—	3–2	1–2	1–1	0–0	1–1	2–1	2–1	1–2	0–2	3–2	2–0	3–2	1–2
Covadonga	2–1	0–3	4–0	1–1	0–1	—	0–3	2–2	0–0	1–1	1–1	2–2	1–0	3–1	2–0	0–2	1–1	0–2
Deportivo Fabril	3–2	1–0	2–0	0–0	0–1	4–1	—	1–0	2–2	0–1	2–2	1–3	1–1	2–2	2–0	1–3	2–3	0–0
Gimnástica Torrelavega	1–2	1–1	2–2	3–4	1–3	1–0	2–2	—	3–1	0–1	0–0	2–1	1–1	1–2	2–1	0–3	0–1	2–1
Guijuelo	1–0	1–1	3–1	0–1	2–0	2–1	1–0	2–1	—	2–0	1–0	1–1	1–1	1–2	2–0	2–1	0–2	0–0
Langreo	2–0	0–2	0–0	1–0	3–2	0–5	1–0	1–0	1–1	—	0–0	1–1	0–0	0–0	0–0	4–1	0–2	1–1
Marino Luanco	3–1	0–0	1–0	0–0	0–1	3–0	1–1	0–1	1–0	1–1	—	0–0	1–0	1–2	2–0	0–1	0–0	2–0
Ourense CF	2–0	2–0	1–0	2–0	5–1	3–1	1–0	2–1	1–0	3–0	1–0	—	2–0	0–0	2–0	3–0	4–1	0–3
Oviedo Vetusta	0–1	1–1	1–0	0–1	2–0	5–0	1–2	0–2	1–0	1–1	1–1	0–0	—	2–3	1–3	2–2	0–1	1–1
Pontevedra	2–0	2–0	4–1	3–0	3–1	2–0	4–1	1–2	5–0	6–0	2–1	0–2	3–0	—	1–0	0–0	3–1	1–3
Racing Villalbés	0–0	1–1	2–2	0–0	2–0	1–2	1–0	1–0	2–1	0–1	0–0	1–1	0–0	1–1	—	0–1	0–0	0–0
Rayo Cantabria	2–4	2–1	1–1	3–1	2–1	0–0	1–1	2–1	1–2	2–3	2–0	1–1	5–1	2–2	0–0	—	4–0	0–0
Valladolid Promesas	1–4	1–2	5–2	2–0	1–1	3–1	3–4	3–1	0–2	2–1	0–2	0–1	1–0	1–1	0–1	1–1	—	2–1
Zamora	4–1	1–0	1–0	2–1	2–0	2–0	1–2	4–0	1–0	1–1	0–0	0–0	3–0	0–4	1–1	1–0	1–1	—

Legend: Blue = home team win; Yellow = draw; Red = away team win.

==== Top scorers ====
Rank	Player	Club	Goal
1	(Spain) Rufo	Pontevedra	16
2	(Spain) Javi Delgado	Gimnástica Torrelavega	15
3	(Spain) Natalio	Avilés Industrial	14

=== Group 2 ===
Location of teams in 2023–24 Segunda Federación – Group 2
Location of Navarre teams in 2023–24 Segunda Federación – Group 2
Location of teams in 2023–24 Segunda Federación – Group 2 (Basque Country)

==== Teams and locations ====
Team	Home city	Stadium	Capacity
Alavés B	Vitoria	José Luis Compañón	2,500
Arenas	Getxo	Gobela	2,000
Barakaldo	Barakaldo	Lasesarre	7,960
Barbastro	Barbastro	Municipal de Deportes	5,000
Bilbao Athletic	Bilbao	Lezama	3,250
Brea	Brea de Aragón	Piedrabuena	2,000
Calahorra	Calahorra	La Planilla	4,500
Deportivo Aragón	Zaragoza	Ciudad Deportiva	2,500
Gernika	Gernika-Lumo	Urbieta	3,000
Izarra	Estella-Lizarra	Merkatondoa	3,500
UD Logroñés	Logroño	Las Gaunas	16,000
Mutilvera	Aranguren	Valle Aranguren	2,000
Náxara	Nájera	La Salera	1,500
Real Sociedad C	San Sebastián	José Luis Orbegozo	2,500
San Juan	Pamplona	San Juan	1,000
Tudelano	Tudela	Ciudad de Tudela	11,000
Utebo	Utebo	Santa Ana	5,000
Valle de Egüés	Egüés	Sarriguren	2,000

==== Personnel and sponsorship ====
Team	Manager	Captain	Kit manufacturer	Shirt main sponsor
Alavés B	(Spain) José Manuel Aira	(Spain) Unai Ropero	Puma	Ingevel
Arenas	(Spain) Pedro Vadillo	(Spain) Gabri Lizarraga	Adidas	Selzur
Barakaldo	(Spain) Imanol de la Sota	(Spain) Jon Tena	New Balance	
Barbastro	(Spain) Dani Martínez	(Spain) Perso	Nike	AB Energía
Bilbao Athletic	(Spain) Carlos Gurpegui	(Spain) Beñat Gerenabarrena	Castore	
Brea	(Spain) Raúl Parada	(Spain) Pepo	Hummel	Tapigrama Sofás, AMB Green Power
Calahorra	(Spain) Carlos Pouso	(Spain) Miguel Martínez	Luanvi	Ramiro Arnedo Semillas
Deportivo Aragón	(Spain) Emilio Larraz	(Spain) Guillermo Acín	Adidas	Caravan Fragancias
Gernika	(Spain) Germán Beltrán	(Spain) Jon Altamira	Legea	Prado Lerma
Izarra	(Spain) Iñigo de Goñi	(Spain) Eneko Martínez	Adidas	QuaZZartech, PJR Gestión Promotora
UD Logroñés	(Spain) Diego Martínez	(Spain) Iñaki Sáenz	Macron	Natur House
Mutilvera	(Spain) Álvaro Garrido	(Spain) Álvaro Aldave	Luanvi	Valle de Aranguren
Náxara	(Spain) Josean García	(Georgia (country)) Nika Sharikadze		One Shot Hotels
Real Sociedad C	(Spain) Mikel Llorente	(Spain) Aitor Fraga	Macron	Kutxabank
San Juan	(Spain) Julen Foncillas	(Spain) Ander Iriguibel	Zico	Autocares Fonseca
Tudelano	(Spain) David González	(Spain) Mikel Santamaría	Mizuno	Urzante
Utebo	(Spain) Juan Carlos Beltrán	(Spain) David Marín	Nike	Alcampo, Cintasa
Valle de Egüés	(Spain) Txiki Alcaz	(Spain) Xabier Olagüe	Industrias Mercury	Valle de Egüés/Eguesibar

==== League table ====
Pos	Team	Pld	W	D	L	GF	GA	GD	Pts	Qualification
1	Bilbao Athletic (C, P)	34	25	7	2	68	17	+51	82	Promotion to Primera Federación
2	Barakaldo (P)	34	22	10	2	61	19	+42	76	Qualification for the promotion play-offs and Copa del Rey
3	UD Logroñés	34	20	11	3	70	17	+53	71	Qualification for the promotion play-offs and Copa del Rey
4	Utebo	34	17	10	7	40	31	+9	61	Qualification for the promotion play-offs and Copa del Rey
5	Deportivo Aragón	34	15	11	8	51	40	+11	56	Qualification for the promotion play-offs
6	Alavés B	34	16	4	14	57	42	+15	52	
7	Tudelano	34	12	12	10	45	32	+13	48	Qualification for the Copa del Rey
8	Barbastro	34	11	14	9	28	28	0	47 (Note: Barbastro finished ahead of Real Sociedad C on head-to-head points: Real Sociedad C 0–1 Barbastro, Barbastro 3–1 Real Sociedad C)	Qualification for the Copa del Rey
9	Real Sociedad C	34	12	11	11	35	37	−2	47	
10	Calahorra	34	13	7	14	36	38	−2	46	
11	Gernika	34	11	10	13	37	48	−11	43	
12	Arenas	34	9	14	11	35	37	−2	41	
13	Izarra (O)	34	10	6	18	32	51	−19	36	Qualification for the relegation play-offs
14	San Juan (R)	34	8	9	17	29	47	−18	33 (Note: San Juan finished ahead of Mutilvera on head-to-head goal difference: Mutilvera 1–0 San Juan, San Juan 3–0 Mutilvera)	Relegation to Tercera Federación
15	Mutilvera (R)	34	9	6	19	21	50	−29	33	Relegation to Tercera Federación
16	Náxara (R)	34	6	6	22	23	60	−37	24	Relegation to Tercera Federación
17	Valle de Egüés (R)	34	5	6	23	25	58	−33	21 (Note: Valle de Egüés finished ahead of Brea on head-to-head points: Brea 1–2 Valle de Egüés, Valle de Egüés 0–0 Brea)	Relegation to Tercera Federación
18	Brea (R)	34	5	6	23	15	56	−41	21	Relegation to Tercera Federación

Updated to match(es) played on 5 May 2024. Source:
Rules for classification: 1) points; 2) head-to-head points; 3) head-to-head goal difference; 4) goal difference; 5) number of goals scored
(C) Champions; (O) Play-off winners; (P) Promoted; (R) Relegated

==== Results ====
Home \ Away	ALA	ARE	BRK	BRB	ATH	BRE	CAL	ARA	GER	IZA	LOG	MUT	NAX	RSO	SJU	TUD	UTE	VEG
Alavés B	—	0–1	1–2	1–1	0–2	5–0	3–2	1–0	1–2	3–1	1–0	2–0	5–1	1–0	2–0	3–2	0–1	6–2
Arenas	1–2	—	1–1	0–0	0–3	0–0	0–1	2–2	0–0	1–2	2–1	0–0	4–0	0–2	1–1	1–2	1–1	3–1
Barakaldo	3–2	1–0	—	1–0	1–2	2–0	1–1	1–0	3–3	2–0	1–1	3–0	1–0	5–0	6–0	3–1	1–1	1–0
Barbastro	3–2	0–0	0–2	—	0–0	2–1	1–0	1–1	1–0	2–3	0–0	0–0	3–0	3–1	1–1	0–0	1–1	1–0
Bilbao Athletic	2–1	2–1	2–1	4–0	—	3–0	2–1	2–0	3–1	2–1	0–0	3–1	4–0	3–0	3–1	4–0	0–1	3–1
Brea	1–0	0–1	0–2	0–0	0–5	—	0–2	0–1	0–2	1–1	0–2	0–1	1–0	0–1	1–0	1–3	0–2	1–2
Calahorra	0–2	0–1	1–1	1–0	0–1	2–1	—	4–3	0–1	2–1	0–1	3–0	2–2	0–2	1–1	0–2	1–0	3–0
Deportivo Aragón	2–1	2–1	0–4	0–2	2–2	2–0	0–0	—	1–1	3–1	1–1	2–0	3–0	3–1	3–0	0–0	2–0	2–0
Gernika	3–1	2–2	0–1	0–1	1–1	1–0	2–0	0–1	—	1–1	0–2	1–1	1–1	3–1	1–0	1–4	2–0	3–0
Izarra	1–0	2–0	0–0	2–0	0–1	0–1	2–1	1–3	2–2	—	0–2	2–1	3–0	0–0	1–0	1–0	1–2	0–2
UD Logroñés	1–1	5–1	0–0	0–0	0–0	4–1	4–0	4–0	7–1	4–1	—	3–0	5–0	0–0	1–0	3–1	3–0	3–2
Mutilvera	1–3	1–4	1–3	0–0	0–3	1–2	0–2	1–3	3–0	1–0	1–2	—	1–0	0–0	1–0	0–0	0–3	1–0
Náxara	0–1	0–0	0–0	0–3	1–2	3–0	0–1	2–2	2–1	3–1	0–3	0–1	—	0–1	0–0	1–0	1–0	3–2
Real Sociedad C	2–2	2–2	0–1	0–1	0–0	3–2	1–2	1–1	2–0	2–1	2–0	1–0	1–0	—	4–0	1–2	0–0	1–0
San Juan	1–0	1–1	0–2	3–1	1–0	0–0	0–1	0–1	0–0	4–0	0–4	3–0	2–1	2–2	—	1–1	0–1	2–0
Tudelano	2–0	0–0	0–1	0–0	1–2	2–0	1–1	0–0	5–0	4–0	1–1	0–1	2–0	0–0	3–0	—	0–0	1–4
Utebo	2–2	0–2	1–1	1–0	0–0	1–1	1–0	3–2	1–0	1–0	0–3	2–0	3–2	3–1	3–2	2–2	—	2–0
Valle de Egüés	0–2	0–1	1–3	3–0	0–2	0–0	1–1	3–3	0–1	0–0	0–0	0–2	1–0	0–0	0–3	0–3	0–1	—

Updated to match(es) played on 5 May 2024. Source:
Legend: Blue = home team win; Yellow = draw; Red = away team win.

==== Top scorers ====
Rank	Player	Club	Goal
1	(Spain) Urko Izeta	Bilbao Athletic	21
2	(Spain) Unai Ropero	Alavés B	19
3	(Spain) Alex Valiño	Sestao River	14

=== Group 3 ===
Location of teams in 2023–24 Segunda Federación – Group 3
Location of teams in 2023–24 Segunda Federación – Group 3 (Province of Barcelona)

==== Teams and locations ====
Team	Home city	Stadium	Capacity
Alzira	Alzira	Luis Suñer Picó	5,000
Andratx	Andratx	Sa Plana	600
Atlético Saguntino	Sagunto	Nou Camp de Morvedre	4,000
Badalona Futur	Badalona	Municipal	4,000
Cerdanyola del Vallès	Cerdanyola del Vallès	Fontetes	1,000
Espanyol B	Barcelona	Dani Jarque	1,520
Europa	Barcelona	Nou Sardenya	7,000
Formentera	Sant Francesc Xavier	Municipal	500
Hércules	Alicante	José Rico Pérez	30,000
La Nucía	La Nucía	Camilo Cano	3,000
Lleida Esportiu	Lleida	Camp d'Esports	13,500
Manresa	Manresa	Nou Congost	3,000
Peña Deportiva	Santa Eulària des Riu	Municipal de Santa Eulària	1,500
Penya Independent	Sant Miquel de Balansat	Municipal	2,000
Sant Andreu	Barcelona	Narcís Sala	6,653
Terrassa	Terrassa	Olímpic	11,500
Torrent	Torrent	San Gregorio	3,000
Valencia Mestalla	Paterna	Antonio Puchades	2,300

==== Personnel and sponsorship ====
Team	Manager	Captain	Kit manufacturer	Shirt main sponsor
Alzira	(Spain) Marc García	(Georgia (country)) Lado Mokhevishvili		MYR Hotels
Andratx	(Spain) José Contreras	(Spain) Vicenç Sabater	Luanvi	Bodega Terra IóN, Grupo Edbaser
Atlético Saguntino	(Spain) Benito Espinosa (caretaker)	(Spain) Kike Torrent	Kappa	Lepicentre
Badalona Futur	(Spain) Kiku Parcerisas	(Spain) Édgar Hernández	Nike	
Cerdanyola del Vallès	(Spain) Oliver Ballabriga	(Spain) Max Marcet	Kappa	Ajuntament de Cerdanyola
Espanyol B	(Spain) Javi Chica	(Spain) Álex Pérez	Kelme	Conservas Dani
Europa	(Spain) Ramon Gatell and (Spain) Ignasi Senabre	(Spain) Àlex Cano	Adidas	Clínica Remei
Formentera	(Spain) Maikel Romero	(Spain) Alberto Górriz	Adidas	Trasmapi
Hércules	(Spain) Rubén Torrecilla	(Spain) Carlos Abad	Kappa	Concesionarios Marcos Automoción
La Nucía	(Spain) Kiko Lacasa (caretaker)	(Spain) Mariano Sanz	Nike	
Lleida Esportiu	(Spain) Ángel Viadero	(Spain) Roger Figueras	Adidas	Hinaco Constructora Inmobiliaria
Manresa	(Spain) Aitor Maeso	(Spain) Javi López	Kappa	ROC Consultors, Bar Restaurant Les Pistes
Peña Deportiva	(Spain) Alberto Gallego	(Spain) Manuel Salinas	Joma	Hermanos Parrot, Jardín Mediterráneo, Blakstad, Infinitel, Baleària
Penya Independent	(Spain) Mario Ormaechea	(Spain) Vicent Albert	Kelme	Fincadelica, Six Senses
Sant Andreu	(Spain) Xavi Molist	(Spain) Tito García	Meyba	
Terrassa	(Spain) Chus Trujillo	(Spain) Marcos Pérez	Capelli Sport	FCV Aislamientos envolventes
Torrent	(Spain) Vicente Mir	(Spain) Adrián Lois	Nike	BigMat Aldino
Valencia Mestalla	(Spain) Miguel Ángel Angulo	(Spain) Iván Muñoz	Puma	TM Real Estate Group

==== League table ====
Pos	Team	Pld	W	D	L	GF	GA	GD	Pts	Qualification
1	Hércules (C, P)	34	19	8	7	53	30	+23	65	Promotion to Primera Federación and qualification to Copa del Rey
2	Europa	34	17	12	5	63	32	+31	63	Qualification for the promotion play-offs and Copa del Rey
3	Badalona Futur	34	16	11	7	42	25	+17	59	Qualification for the promotion play-offs and Copa del Rey
4	Sant Andreu	34	16	10	8	53	33	+20	58 (Note: Sant Andreu finished ahead of Lleida Esportiu on head-to-head points: Sant Andreu 1–1 Lleida Esportiu, Lleida Esportiu 0–1 Sant Andreu)	Qualification for the promotion play-offs and Copa del Rey
5	Lleida Esportiu	34	18	4	12	45	31	+14	58	Qualification for the promotion play-offs and Copa del Rey
6	Terrassa	34	13	11	10	45	40	+5	50	
7	Torrent	34	13	10	11	40	37	+3	49	
8	Alzira	34	11	13	10	39	41	−2	46 (Note: Alzira finished ahead of Espanyol B on head-to-head points: Espanyol B 1–2 Alzira, Alzira 2–2 Espanyol B)	
9	Espanyol B	34	12	10	12	40	44	−4	46	
10	Peña Deportiva	34	12	9	13	49	58	−9	45	
11	Valencia Mestalla	34	11	11	12	48	39	+9	44 (Note: Head-to-head points: Valencia Mestalla 8 pts, Andratx 6 pts, Formentera 1 pt)	
12	Andratx	34	11	11	12	40	47	−7	44	
13	Formentera (R)	34	12	8	14	40	42	−2	44	Qualification for the relegation play-offs
14	Atlético Saguntino (R)	34	11	9	14	32	42	−10	42	Relegation to Tercera Federación
15	Cerdanyola del Vallès (R)	34	9	10	15	35	45	−10	37	Relegation to Tercera Federación
16	Penya Independent (R)	34	9	7	18	32	52	−20	34	Relegation to Tercera Federación
17	Manresa (R)	34	6	9	19	23	41	−18	27	Relegation to Tercera Federación
18	La Nucía (R)	34	4	9	21	23	63	−40	21	Relegation to Tercera Federación

Updated to match(es) played on 5 May 2024. Source:
Rules for classification: 1) points; 2) head-to-head points; 3) head-to-head goal difference; 4) goal difference; 5) number of goals scored
(Note: Head-to-head record is used only after all the matches between the teams in question have been played)
(C) Champions; (P) Promoted; (R) Relegated

==== Results ====
Home \ Away	ALZ	AND	SAG	BFU	CER	ESP	EUR	FOR	HER	LNU	LLE	MAN	PDE	PIN	SAN	TER	TOR	VAL
Alzira	—	2–2	2–1	1–1	1–0	2–2	1–0	2–2	0–1	3–0	0–2	0–0	0–0	0–0	1–1	1–3	1–1	2–1
Andratx	1–0	—	1–1	2–1	3–2	2–1	1–1	0–0	0–2	4–1	2–3	0–0	0–2	0–0	0–3	0–2	1–1	1–1
Atlético Saguntino	0–2	1–0	—	1–1	0–1	3–1	2–1	1–0	3–1	0–0	1–0	0–2	0–1	2–1	0–2	1–0	0–2	3–1
Badalona Futur	1–0	0–1	2–1	—	0–1	1–0	0–0	1–0	1–2	1–0	0–0	0–0	2–1	1–1	1–0	1–1	3–1	2–1
Cerdanyola del Vallès	2–2	1–2	1–0	0–0	—	2–3	1–2	0–2	1–1	0–0	0–0	3–0	1–1	1–1	2–1	2–0	1–1	0–1
Espanyol B	1–2	0–2	2–1	1–0	3–1	—	1–1	0–1	2–1	1–2	3–1	2–0	2–1	2–1	1–0	2–2	1–0	1–1
Europa	0–0	2–2	4–0	2–1	2–0	6–0	—	2–1	1–0	4–2	3–0	4–0	6–0	2–1	3–0	2–0	1–0	3–3
Formentera	0–2	2–3	1–1	0–0	3–0	1–1	0–0	—	1–2	2–2	1–0	3–1	1–2	3–0	3–1	1–1	1–0	1–3
Hércules	1–1	1–0	3–0	2–2	3–0	1–0	0–0	0–1	—	1–0	2–1	1–0	5–1	2–3	3–1	1–1	2–0	0–0
La Nucía	1–2	2–3	2–2	0–3	0–2	0–0	1–1	0–2	0–0	—	0–1	2–0	0–2	0–1	0–2	2–1	1–0	0–6
Lleida Esportiu	3–1	3–0	1–0	0–1	3–0	1–0	0–1	3–0	0–1	0–0	—	1–0	3–2	3–1	0–1	3–2	4–1	3–2
Manresa	0–1	1–2	0–0	1–2	1–0	0–1	3–1	3–0	0–1	2–0	1–0	—	1–1	1–1	1–1	1–2	1–2	0–1
Peña Deportiva	3–1	2–1	2–2	1–3	0–0	1–1	2–2	0–1	1–5	4–1	1–3	2–1	—	4–1	1–3	0–1	2–1	2–1
Penya Independent	2–1	2–1	0–1	1–0	1–3	1–0	1–1	1–3	1–2	3–0	0–1	1–0	3–1	—	0–1	1–3	1–2	0–3
Sant Andreu	3–0	4–1	3–1	1–1	3–4	1–1	2–3	1–0	3–1	4–1	1–1	0–0	2–2	4–0	—	0–0	0–0	0–0
Terrassa	2–2	1–0	1–2	1–4	1–1	1–1	4–1	2–1	2–2	3–1	1–0	2–2	1–1	1–0	0–1	—	0–1	1–0
Torrent	3–1	1–1	1–1	1–3	1–0	1–1	2–1	3–0	2–1	0–0	2–0	1–0	2–3	2–0	1–2	2–1	—	0–0
Valencia Mestalla	1–2	1–1	0–0	0–2	3–1	3–2	0–0	4–2	1–2	3–2	0–1	3–0	1–0	1–1	0–1	0–1	2–2	—

Updated to match(es) played on 5 May 2024. Source:
Legend: Blue = home team win; Yellow = draw; Red = away team win.

==== Top scorers ====
Rank	Player	Club	Goal
1	(Spain) Aythami Perera	Terrassa	15
2	(Spain) Boris Garrós	Cerdanyola del Vallès	13
2	(Guinea-Bissau) Marcos Mendes	Hércules	13

=== Group 4 ===
Location of teams in 2023–24 Segunda Federación – Group 4

==== Teams and locations ====
Team	Home city	Stadium	Capacity
Águilas	Águilas	El Rubial	4,000
Atlético Antoniano	Lebrija	Municipal de Lebrija	3,500
Betis Deportivo	Seville	Luis del Sol	1,300
Cádiz Mirandilla	Cádiz	Ramón Blanco Rodríguez	2,500
Cartagena B	Cartagena	Ciudad Jardín	2,000
El Palo	Málaga	San Ignacio	1,000
Estepona	Estepona	Francisco Muñoz Pérez	3,800
La Unión Atlético	La Unión	Municipal	3,000
Linense	La Línea de la Concepción	Municipal de La Línea	12,000
Manchego	Ciudad Real	Juan Carlos I	3,000
Marbella	Marbella	Municipal de Marbella	7,300
Orihuela	Orihuela	Los Arcos	7,000
Racing Cartagena MM	Cartagena	Ciudad Deportiva Gómez Meseguer	1,000
San Roque Lepe	Lepe	Ciudad de Lepe	3,512
Sevilla Atlético	Seville	Jesús Navas	8,000
UCAM Murcia	Murcia	La Condomina	6,000
Vélez	Vélez-Málaga	Vivar Téllez	2,100
Yeclano	Yecla	La Constitución	4,000

==== Personnel and sponsorship ====
Team	Manager	Captain	Kit manufacturer	Shirt main sponsor
Águilas	(Spain) Sergio Yúfera	(Spain) Ramón Arcas	Joma	Urcisol
Atlético Antoniano	(Spain) Diego Galiano	(Spain) Juanfran	Luanvi	Grupo Velázquez
Betis Deportivo	(Spain) Arzu	(Spain) Ricardo Visus	Hummel	Forever Green
Cádiz Mirandilla	(Spain) Alberto Cifuentes	(Spain) Dani García	Macron	Digi
Cartagena B	(Spain) Pepe Aguilar	(Spain) Antonio Arcos	Macron	Grupo Sanitario Ribera
El Palo	(Spain) Juanma	(Spain) Lulu	Nike	BeSoccer
Estepona	(Spain) Salva Ballesta	(Spain) Lolo Guerrero	Joma	Air Europa
La Unión Atlético	(Spain) Juan Alcoy	(Spain) Monty	Adidas	Fundación Cante de las Minas
Linense	(Spain) Antonio Fernández	(Spain) Diego Jiménez	Legea	Lotus Watches
Manchego	(Argentina) Patricio Graff	(Spain) Pascu	Joma	
Marbella	(Spain) Fran Beltrán	(Spain) José Carrasco	Adidas	Ayuntamiento de Marbella
Orihuela	(Spain) Sergi Guilló	(Spain) Brian Pallarés	Nike	Johnson
Racing Cartagena MM	(Spain) Javi Motos	(Spain) Francisco Cifuentes	Kelme	GROEPO
San Roque Lepe	(Spain) Juan Manuel Pavón	(Spain) Juan Carlos Camacho	Gañafote	Supermercados El Jamón
Sevilla Atlético	(Spain) Jesús Galván	(Spain) Miguel Capitas	Castore	
UCAM Murcia	(Spain) Alberto Monteagudo	(Spain) José Fran	Hummel	UCAM Universidad
Vélez	(Sweden) Magnus Pehrsson	(Spain) Andrés Ortega	Umbro	Avatel Telecom
Yeclano	(Spain) Adrián Hernández	(Spain) Juan Riquelme	Gobik	Victyres, Xti, Yecla Denominación de Origen

==== League table ====
Pos	Team	Pld	W	D	L	GF	GA	GD	Pts	Qualification
1	Sevilla Atlético (C, P)	34	18	12	4	52	20	+32	66	Promotion to Primera Federación
2	Yeclano (P)	34	17	9	8	43	29	+14	60	Qualification for the promotion play-offs and Copa del Rey
3	Marbella (P)	34	16	8	10	41	32	+9	56	Qualification for the promotion play-offs and Copa del Rey
4	Orihuela	34	15	9	10	39	37	+2	54	Qualification for the promotion play-offs and Copa del Rey
5	Betis Deportivo (P)	34	13	14	7	44	28	+16	53	Qualification for the promotion play-offs
6	Estepona	34	13	10	11	34	27	+7	49	Qualification for the Copa del Rey
7	Águilas	34	11	15	8	27	20	+7	48	Qualification for the Copa del Rey
8	UCAM Murcia	34	13	8	13	42	35	+7	47 (Note: UCAM Murcia finished ahead of Linense on head-to-head points: Linense 0–2 UCAM Murcia, UCAM Murcia 1–1 Linense)	
9	Linense	34	12	11	11	35	33	+2	47	
10	Atlético Antoniano	34	12	10	12	32	40	−8	46	
11	La Unión Atlético (Note: La Unión Atlético deducted 3 points on 21 March for not having a physician on staff.)	34	14	4	16	36	36	0	43	
12	Cádiz Mirandilla	34	10	12	12	41	43	−2	42	
13	Manchego (R)	34	9	14	11	29	36	−7	41	Qualification for the relegation play-offs
14	Racing Cartagena MM (R)	34	9	13	12	20	28	−8	40	Relegation to Tercera Federación
15	El Palo (R)	34	8	12	14	26	36	−10	36 (Note: El Palo finished ahead of San Roque Lepe on head-to-head points: El Palo 1–0 San Roque Lepe, San Roque Lepe 0–0 El Palo)	Relegation to Tercera Federación
16	San Roque Lepe (R)	34	9	9	16	34	39	−5	36	Relegation to Tercera Federación
17	Vélez (Note: Vélez deducted 3 points after their Round 26 match against Manchego for not having enough professional players in the squad.) (R)	34	7	11	16	31	61	−30	29	Relegation to Tercera Federación
18	Cartagena B (R)	34	4	11	19	25	51	−26	23	Relegation to Tercera Federación

Updated to match(es) played on 5 May 2024. Source:
Rules for classification: 1) points; 2) head-to-head points; 3) head-to-head goal difference; 4) goal difference; 5) number of goals scored
(C) Champions; (P) Promoted; (R) Relegated

==== Results ====
Home \ Away	AGU	ANT	BET	CAD	CAR	EPA	EST	LUA	LIN	MAN	MRB	ORI	MMN	SRL	SEV	UCM	VEL	YEC
Águilas	—	3–1	1–1	3–0	1–1	0–2	1–0	2–0	0–1	1–0	1–0	0–0	0–0	1–2	1–0	1–0	1–0	1–1
Atlético Antoniano	3–2	—	2–1	0–0	0–0	3–1	0–0	0–2	2–0	1–0	3–0	2–1	0–1	1–0	2–0	1–0	0–0	0–3
Betis Deportivo	0–0	5–2	—	2–1	1–0	2–0	1–1	1–2	1–0	3–1	5–1	1–2	3–0	1–0	1–1	2–0	2–0	0–0
Cádiz Mirandilla	0–0	1–1	1–1	—	2–2	3–1	1–1	3–1	1–2	1–1	0–2	2–3	3–0	2–1	1–2	0–1	0–0	3–1
Cartagena B	0–2	0–0	3–1	0–2	—	1–2	1–2	1–1	2–1	0–4	1–1	0–1	2–0	1–1	0–0	1–1	1–2	1–2
El Palo	0–1	1–1	2–0	3–1	2–2	—	0–2	0–1	0–2	0–0	1–1	1–2	1–0	1–0	1–1	0–2	0–0	1–1
Estepona	2–1	3–0	1–1	0–1	1–0	1–1	—	0–1	1–1	3–0	0–1	0–0	2–0	3–1	0–4	1–0	4–1	0–2
La Unión Atlético	1–0	2–1	1–0	1–2	3–1	1–2	0–1	—	0–1	0–0	1–0	0–0	0–0	4–1	1–3	2–0	3–2	1–0
Linense	0–0	4–2	1–1	0–0	2–0	0–0	0–2	2–1	—	1–1	2–0	2–0	0–0	1–1	2–0	0–2	3–1	1–4
Manchego	0–0	1–2	1–1	1–1	1–0	0–0	1–0	2–1	2–1	—	0–1	2–1	0–0	0–3	1–1	2–1	1–1	0–1
Marbella	1–1	0–0	0–2	3–1	1–0	1–0	0–0	1–0	1–0	3–1	—	2–2	1–0	2–1	2–0	2–0	1–1	1–2
Orihuela	2–1	2–0	0–0	2–4	2–0	2–1	2–0	1–0	1–2	0–2	1–1	—	1–0	3–2	1–4	1–1	0–2	2–3
Racing Cartagena MM	0–0	0–1	1–1	0–0	0–0	1–0	1–1	1–0	1–0	2–0	0–3	0–0	—	2–1	1–1	2–1	3–0	1–1
San Roque Lepe	0–0	0–0	1–1	1–1	4–1	0–0	0–1	1–0	0–0	1–1	1–0	0–1	2–1	—	1–2	3–0	1–0	2–1
Sevilla Atlético	0–0	3–0	1–1	5–0	3–0	3–0	1–0	2–0	2–1	3–0	2–0	0–0	1–0	2–1	—	1–1	1–1	2–0
UCAM Murcia	0–0	0–0	1–0	1–0	3–0	1–0	1–0	3–1	1–1	1–1	0–2	0–2	2–1	2–0	0–0	—	9–0	4–1
Vélez	1–1	2–1	0–0	0–3	0–2	0–2	1–1	0–4	3–1	1–1	2–6	2–0	0–1	2–1	0–1	3–1	—	2–2
Yeclano	1–0	2–0	0–1	1–0	2–1	0–0	1–0	2–0	0–0	0–1	1–0	0–1	0–0	1–0	0–0	4–2	3–1	—

Updated to match(es) played on 5 May 2024. Source:
Legend: Blue = home team win; Yellow = draw; Red = away team win.

==== Top scorers ====
Rank	Player	Club	Goal
1	(Cameroon) Karl Etta Eyong	Cádiz Mirandilla	14
2	(Spain) Isaac Romero	Sevilla Atlético	11
3	(Spain) Arturo	UCAM Murcia	10
3	(Spain) Juanmi Callejón	Orihuela	10
3	(Spain) Musa Drammeh	Sevilla Atlético	10

=== Group 5 ===
Location of teams in 2023–24 Segunda Federación – Group 5
Location of teams of the 2023–24 Segunda Federación – Group 5 (Canary Islands)
Location of teams in 2023–24 Segunda Federación – Group 5 (Community of Madrid)

==== Teams and locations ====
Team	Home city	Stadium	Capacity
Atlético Paso	El Paso	Municipal El Paso	5,000
Badajoz	Badajoz	Nuevo Vivero	15,198
Cacereño	Cáceres	Príncipe Felipe	7,000
Getafe B	Getafe	Ciudad Deportiva	1,500
Gimnástica Segoviana	Segovia	La Albuera	6,000
Guadalajara	Guadalajara	Pedro Escartín	8,000
Illescas	Illescas	Municipal	1,000
Llerenense	Llerena	Fernando Robina	1,000
Mensajero	Santa Cruz de La Palma	Silvestre Carillo	6,000
Montijo	Montijo	Municipal	2,000
Navalcarnero	Navalcarnero	Mariano González	2,500
Numancia	Soria	Los Pajaritos	8,261
San Fernando	Maspalomas	Ciudad Deportiva	1,000
San Sebastián de los Reyes	San Sebastián de los Reyes	Matapiñonera	3,000
Talavera de la Reina	Talavera de la Reina	El Prado	5,000
Unión Adarve	Madrid	Vicente del Bosque	1,500
Ursaria	Cobeña	La Dehesa	1,500
Villanovense	Villanueva de la Serena	Romero Cuerda	5,000

==== Personnel and sponsorship ====
Team	Manager	Captain	Kit manufacturer	Shirt main sponsor
Atlético Paso	(Spain) Manolo Sanlúcar	(Spain) Armiche Ortega	C. Pitter	Ayuntamientos de La Palma
Badajoz	(Spain) Luis Oliver (caretaker)	(Spain) Carlos Cordero	Adidas	
Cacereño	(Spain) Julio Cobos	(Spain) Álvaro Clausí	Adidas	Ribatrans
Getafe B	(Spain) Gabi	(Spain) Nico Conesa	Joma	Tecnocasa
Gimnástica Segoviana	(Spain) Ramsés Gil	(Spain) Manu	Adidas	BIO AMMO, IMDSG
Guadalajara	(Spain) Gonzalo Ónega	(Spain) Javier Ablanque	Kappa	Lener Constructora
Illescas	(Spain) Pablo Nozal	(Spain) David Ranera	Joma	Ayuntamiento de Illescas
Llerenense	(Spain) Luismi Álvarez	(Spain) Mario Tomé	Macron	Extremadura, Ayuntamiento de Llerena
Mensajero	(Spain) Yoni Oujo	(Spain) Vianney Nieto	New Balance	Ayuntamientos de La Palma
Montijo	(Spain) Jesús Acevedo	(Spain) Álex Bravo	Nike	Extremadura
Navalcarnero	(Spain) Guillermo Fernández	(Spain) Fratelli	Aimar	Sasegur
Numancia	(Spain) Javi Moreno	(Spain) Javi Bonilla	Erreà	Grupo Herce
San Fernando	(Venezuela) Juan Carlos Socorro	(Spain) Andrés Trujillo	Adidas	Avia Car
San Sebastián de los Reyes	(Spain) Pablo Álvarez	(Spain) Saúl González	Nike	Tecnitasa Group
Talavera de la Reina	(Spain) Luis Ayllón	(Spain) Dani Ramos	Adidas	Cálida PVC
Unión Adarve	(Spain) Mario Escolante	(Spain) Alberto Miñambres	Macron	Auxadi
Ursaria	(Spain) Joselu Méndez	(Spain) Pablo Villalón	Macron	Agitera
Villanovense	(Spain) Gus	(Spain) Ángel Pajuelo	Kappa	Extremadura, Gosadex

==== League table ====
Pos	Team	Pld	W	D	L	GF	GA	GD	Pts	Qualification
1	Gimnástica Segoviana (C, P)	34	17	10	7	46	27	+19	61 (Note: Gimnástica Segoviana finished ahead of San Sebastián de los Reyes on head-to-head points: San Sebastián de los Reyes 0–0 Gimnástica Segoviana, Gimnástica Segoviana 1–0 San Sebastián de los Reyes)	Promotion to Primera Federación and qualification to Copa del Rey
2	San Sebastián de los Reyes	34	16	13	5	61	26	+35	61	Qualification for the promotion play-offs and Copa del Rey
3	Numancia	34	18	6	10	51	39	+12	60	Qualification for the promotion play-offs and Copa del Rey
4	Getafe B	34	15	12	7	40	31	+9	57	Qualification for the promotion play-offs
5	Atlético Paso	34	15	11	8	28	21	+7	56	Qualification for the promotion play-offs and Copa del Rey
6	Cacereño	34	12	13	9	43	37	+6	49	Qualification for the Copa del Rey
7	Unión Adarve	34	12	12	10	44	44	0	48	
8	Navalcarnero	34	11	13	10	34	35	−1	46 (Note: Head-to-head points: Navalcarnero 7 pts, Talavera de la Reina 5 pts, Guadalajara 4 pts)	
9	Talavera de la Reina	34	12	10	12	31	27	+4	46	
10	Guadalajara	34	14	4	16	46	53	−7	46	
11	Villanovense	34	12	8	14	35	35	0	44 (Note: Head-to-head points: Villanovense 11 pts, Ursaria 10 pts, Illescas 7 pts, Llerenense 5 pts)	
12	Ursaria	34	12	8	14	34	39	−5	44	
13	Illescas	34	11	11	12	34	32	+2	44	
14	Llerenense (R)	34	12	8	14	31	36	−5	44	Relegation to Tercera Federación
15	San Fernando (R)	34	9	11	14	31	43	−12	38	Relegation to Tercera Federación
16	Badajoz (R)	34	8	13	13	35	39	−4	37	Relegation to Tercera Federación
17	Mensajero (R)	34	5	10	19	28	58	−30	25	Relegation to Tercera Federación
18	Montijo (R)	34	6	5	23	28	58	−30	23	Relegation to Tercera Federación

Updated to match(es) played on 5 May 2024. Source:
Rules for classification: 1) points; 2) head-to-head points; 3) head-to-head goal difference; 4) goal difference; 5) number of goals scored
(Note: Head-to-head record is used only after all the matches between the teams in question have been played)
(C) Champions; (P) Promoted; (R) Relegated

==== Results ====
Home \ Away	ATP	BAD	CAC	GET	GIM	GUA	ILL	LLE	MEN	MON	NAV	NUM	SFE	SSR	TAL	UAD	URS	VIL
Atlético Paso	—	1–0	0–0	1–0	2–1	2–0	1–1	1–0	1–0	2–1	0–0	0–1	1–1	1–0	1–0	2–1	2–0	0–1
Badajoz	0–1	—	2–0	1–1	0–1	1–2	0–0	2–3	3–0	1–1	0–0	1–0	1–0	0–0	3–2	1–2	1–1	0–0
Cacereño	2–0	1–1	—	0–0	2–3	1–3	1–0	0–0	0–0	2–1	2–0	5–0	2–0	1–2	4–0	1–1	2–3	0–1
Getafe B	0–0	0–0	3–3	—	1–1	2–0	0–1	4–1	2–0	1–0	2–1	0–3	2–0	3–1	1–4	2–1	1–0	4–1
Gimnástica Segoviana	2–1	2–1	5–0	1–1	—	2–0	1–0	1–0	0–0	4–1	0–0	2–0	1–0	1–0	0–1	0–1	2–0	3–0
Guadalajara	3–1	1–1	0–2	1–0	1–1	—	1–2	3–2	6–2	2–1	3–2	1–0	1–3	1–2	0–2	2–1	1–0	1–2
Illescas	0–0	0–0	0–0	0–0	0–0	1–2	—	0–3	3–1	1–2	2–0	1–2	6–0	0–0	1–0	2–1	1–2	1–1
Llerenense	0–0	2–1	0–0	0–2	1–1	1–0	0–1	—	2–1	3–1	0–1	0–2	1–0	2–2	1–0	3–1	0–2	0–0
Mensajero	0–2	1–1	0–0	0–1	0–1	4–1	1–0	0–1	—	1–1	0–1	2–3	1–0	0–3	1–0	0–3	1–1	1–2
Montijo	0–2	1–2	0–1	0–1	0–2	1–2	0–1	0–1	0–2	—	0–1	1–0	1–2	1–1	1–1	2–1	0–2	1–0
Navalcarnero	1–1	3–1	0–2	0–0	2–2	3–1	2–2	1–0	2–2	4–2	—	1–1	0–1	1–1	0–0	1–2	2–1	0–2
Numancia	3–1	2–2	5–1	1–1	3–1	0–2	2–3	2–0	3–0	1–2	2–0	—	2–0	1–1	1–0	1–0	3–0	1–0
San Fernando	0–0	2–1	2–3	2–2	1–0	2–0	2–2	0–2	1–1	0–2	1–2	1–0	—	0–0	0–0	1–1	0–1	2–0
San Sebastián de los Reyes	2–0	3–2	1–1	1–2	0–0	2–1	2–0	3–0	4–0	4–0	0–0	7–1	2–3	—	0–0	4–0	3–1	1–1
Talavera de la Reina	0–0	1–2	1–2	3–0	1–0	0–0	1–0	1–1	2–0	2–0	0–1	1–1	1–0	1–4	—	0–0	3–0	1–0
Unión Adarve	1–0	3–1	2–2	0–2	3–3	2–2	2–0	2–1	3–3	2–2	1–1	1–1	0–0	0–2	1–0	—	2–1	1–1
Ursaria	0–1	1–0	1–0	0–0	3–0	3–2	0–1	0–0	2–2	4–1	1–0	0–1	1–1	1–1	1–1	0–1	—	1–0
Villanovense	0–0	1–2	0–0	4–0	1–2	2–0	2–1	1–0	3–1	2–1	0–1	1–2	3–3	0–2	0–1	0–1	3–0	—

Updated to match(es) played on 5 May 2024. Source:
Legend: Blue = home team win; Yellow = draw; Red = away team win.

==== Top scorers ====
Rank	Player	Club	Goal
1	(Spain) Diego Morcillo	Guadalajara	18
2	(Spain) Andreu Arasa	San Sebastián de los Reyes	16
3	(Romania) Andrei Lupu	Numancia	14

=== Ranking of 13th-place teams ===
Pos	Team	Pld	W	D	L	GF	GA	GD	Pts	Qualification or relegation
1	Illescas	34	11	11	12	34	32	+2	44	
2	Formentera (R)	34	12	8	14	40	42	−2	44	Qualification for the relegation play-offs
3	Avilés Industrial (O)	34	9	14	11	40	38	+2	41	Qualification for the relegation play-offs
4	Manchego (R)	34	9	14	11	29	36	−7	41	Qualification for the relegation play-offs
5	Izarra (O)	34	10	6	18	32	51	−19	36	Qualification for the relegation play-offs

Updated to match(es) played on 5 May 2024. Source:
Rules for classification: 1) points; 2) goal difference; 3) number of goals scored
(O) Play-off winners; (R) Relegated

== See also ==
- 2023–24 La Liga
- 2023–24 Segunda División
- 2023–24 Primera Federación
- 2023–24 Tercera Federación
