= 2023 Tercera Federación play-offs =

Spanish football league play-offs

The 2023 Tercera Federación play-offs to Segunda Federación from Tercera Federación (promotion play-offs) are the final play-offs for the promotion from 2022–23 Tercera Federación to 2023–24 Segunda Federación.

== Format ==
Group champions will be promoted directly to the Segunda Federación. Due to the remodeling of the RFEF leagues, as of 2021–22 season the promotion play-off is divided into two stages: regional and national. Four teams from each group participate in the regional stage, which were classified between places second and fifth of the regular season. Since 2022–23 season the regional stage is a series of two matches. The second classified will face the fifth classified; and the third will do the same with the fourth. The winners of the two series will play a series to determine the team that will qualify for the national stage.

In the regional phase, if the aggregated score ends in a draw, extra time will be played, if the same result is maintained at the end of extra time, the best seeded team will win.

The national stage will be played by 18 teams, which won their respective regional play-offs. Since 2022–23 season nine different series will be played to determine the winners of the promotion to Segunda Federación.

As of this season, the RFEF recovered the two-legged knockout system, due to the complaints filed against the single knockout system at a neutral venue that had been implemented after COVID-19 and the subsequent reform of the football leagues organized by the RFEF.

== Qualified teams ==
| Group 1 | | Group 2 | | Group 3 | | Group 4 | | Group 5 | | Group 6 | |
|---|---|---|---|---|---|---|---|---|---|---|---|
| 2nd | Arosa | 2nd | Sporting Gijón B | 2nd | Vimenor | 2nd | Vitoria | 2nd | **Sant Andreu** | 2nd | Atzeneta |
| 3rd | Rápido de Bouzas | 3rd | L'Entregu | 3rd | Tropezón | 3rd | Leioa | 3rd | San Cristóbal | 3rd | **Torrent** |
| 4th | **Racing Villalbés** | 4th | Llanera | 4th | Escobedo | 4th | Basconia | 4th | L'Hospitalet | 4th | Atlético Levante |
| 5th | Ourense | 5th | Praviano | 5th | Atlético Albericia | 5th | Deusto | 5th | Peralada | 5th | Roda |
| Group 7 | | Group 8 | | Group 9 | | Group 10 | | Group 11 | | Group 12 | |
| 2nd | RSC Internacional | 2nd | Atlético Astorga | 2nd | Jaén | 2nd | Córdoba B | 2nd | Manacor | 2nd | Lanzarote |
| 3rd | **Getafe B** | 3rd | Salamanca | 3rd | **El Palo** | 3rd | Gerena | 3rd | **Penya Independent** | 3rd | **San Fernando** |
| 4th | Paracuellos Antamira | 4th | Ávila | 4th | Torre del Mar | 4th | Puente Genil | 4th | Poblense | 4th | Las Palmas Atlético |
| 5th | Móstoles URJC | 5th | Atlético Tordesillas | 5th | Atlético Malagueño | 6th | Ciudad de Lucena (Note: Ciudad de Lucena qualified for the play-off, because Sevilla C could not be promoted as Sevilla Atlético already plays in Segunda Federación and both teams are dependent on Sevilla FC.) | 5th | Santanyí | 5th | Villa de Santa Brígida |
| Group 13 | | Group 14 | | Group 15 | | Group 16 | | Group 17 | | Group 18 | |
| 2nd | Lorca Deportiva | 2nd | Azuaga | 2nd | Subiza | 2nd | Varea | 3rd | Huesca B | 2nd | **Illescas** |
| 3rd | **La Unión Atlético** | 3rd | Moralo | 3rd | Ardoi | 4th | La Calzada | 4th | Ejea | 3rd | Quintanar del Rey |
| 4th | Racing Murcia | 4th | Olivenza | 4th | Peña Sport | 5th | Oyonesa | 5th | Tamarite | 4th | Calvo Sotelo |
| 5th | Atlético Pulpileño | 5th | Jerez | 5th | Huarte | 6th | Anguiano (Note: Anguiano qualified for the play-off because Agoncillo cannot be promoted because it is the second reserve team of UD Logroñés, in addition UD Logroñés B, the first reserve team of UD Logroñés, played this season in Segunda Federación and was relegated to Tercera Federación, so Agoncillo was demoted to Regional Preferente.) | 6th | Almudévar | 5th | Villarrubia |

- Teams in **bold** promoted to the Segunda RFEF
- Teams in italics progressed to the national stage

== Regional stage ==
=== Group 1 – Galicia ===
Semi–finals
2 | Arosa | 0 | 3 | 3
5 | UD Ourense | 0 | 0 | 0
3 | Rápido de Bouzas | 1 | 0 | 1
4 | Racing Villalbés | 0 | 2 | 2

Final
2 | Arosa | 1 | 1 | 2
4 | Racing Villalbés | 1 | 2 | 3

- Group champions: Deportivo Fabril

=== Group 2 – Asturias ===
Semi–finals
2 | Sporting Gijón B | 1 | 0 | 1
5 | Praviano | 1 | 1 (a.e.t.) | 2
3 | L'Entregu | 1 | 4 | 5
4 | Llanera | 1 | 0 | 1

Final
3 | L'Entregu | 0 | 2 | 2
5 | Praviano | 0 | 0 | 0

- Group champions: Covadonga

=== Group 3 – Cantabria ===
Semi–finals
2 | Vimenor | 1 | 1 | 2
5 | Atlético Albericia | 1 | 0 | 1
3 | Tropezón | 2 | 1 | 3
4 | Escobedo | 0 | 0 | 0

Final
2 | Vimenor | 2 | 1 | 3
3 | Tropezón | 0 | 1 | 1

- Group champions: Cayón

=== Group 4 – Basque Country ===
Semi–finals
2 | Vitoria | 0 | 1 | 1
5 | Deusto | 0 | 2 | 2
3 | Leioa | 0 | 2 | 2
4 | Basconia | 1 | 0 | 1

Final
3 | Leioa | 2 | 2 | 4
5 | Deusto | 1 | 1 | 2

- Group champions: Barakaldo

=== Group 5 – Catalonia ===
Semi–finals
2 | Sant Andreu | 1 | 1 | 2
5 | Peralada | 0 | 0 | 0
3 | San Cristóbal | 0 | 3 | 3
4 | L'Hospitalet | 1 | 2 | 3

Final
2 | Sant Andreu | 1 | 1 | 2
3 | San Cristóbal | 0 | 0 | 0

- Group champions: Europa

=== Group 6 – Valencian Community ===
Semi–finals
2 | Atzeneta | 2 | 0 | 2
5 | Roda | 0 | 1 | 1
3 | Torrent | 0 | 2 | 2
4 | Atlético Levante | 0 | 0 | 0

Final
2 | Atzeneta | 0 | 0 | 0
3 | Torrent | 0 | 1 | 1

- Group champions: Orihuela

=== Group 7 – Community of Madrid ===
Semi–finals
2 | RSC Internacional | 1 | 4 | 5
5 | Móstoles URJC | 2 | 0 | 2
3 | Getafe B | 2 | 1 | 3
4 | Paracuellos Antamira | 2 | 1 | 3

Final
2 | RSC Internacional | 0 | 1 | 1
3 | Getafe B | 1 | 1 | 2

- Group champions: Ursaria

=== Group 8 – Castile and León ===
Semi–finals
2 | Atlético Astorga | 0 | 3 | 3
5 | Atlético Tordesillas | 1 | 1 | 2
3 | Salamanca | 0 | 2 (a.e.t.) | 2
4 | Ávila | 2 | 0

Final
2 | Atlético Astorga | 1 | 0 | 1
3 | Salamanca | 3 | 1 | 4

- Group champions: Arandina

=== Group 9 – Eastern Andalusia ===
Semi–finals
2 | Jaén | 1 | 1 | 2
5 | Atlético Malagueño | 1 | 2 (a.e.t.) | 3
3 | El Palo | 1 | 1 | 2
4 | Torre del Mar | 0 | 1 | 1

Final
5 | Atlético Malagueño | 0 | 0 | 0
3 | El Palo | 0 | 1 | 1

- Group champions: Marbella

=== Group 10 – Western Andalusia ===
Semi–finals
2 | Córdoba B | 1 | 2 | 3
6 | Ciudad de Lucena | 0 | 3 | 3
3 | Gerena | 2 | 0 | 2
5 | Puente Genil | 2 | 1 | 3

Final
2 | Córdoba B | 0 | 1 | 1
5 | Puente Genil | 0 | 0 | 0

- Group champions: Antoniano

=== Group 11 – Balearic Islands ===
Semi–finals
2 | Manacor | 0 | 1 | 1
5 | Santanyí | 1 | 1 | 2
3 | Penya Independent | 3 | 1 | 4
4 | Poblense | 2 | 1 | 3

Final
3 | Penya Independent | 1 | 1 | 2 (s)
5 | Santanyí | 2 | 0 | 2

- Group champions: Andratx

=== Group 12 – Canary Islands ===
Semi–finals
2 | Lanzarote | 0 | 1 | 1
5 | Villa de Santa Brígida | 1 | 1 | 2
3 | San Fernando | 0 | 2 (a.e.t.) | 2
4 | Las Palmas Atlético | 1 | 1 | 2

Final
3 | San Fernando | 1 | 0 | 1 (s)
5 | Villa de Santa Brígida | 1 | 0 | 1

- Group champions: Mensajero

=== Group 13 – Region of Murcia ===
Semi–finals
2 | Lorca Deportiva | 2 | 2 (a.e.t.) | 4
5 | Atlético Pulpileño | 2 | 1 | 3
3 | La Unión Atlético | 1 | 3 | 4
4 | Racing Murcia | 1 | 2 | 3

Final
2 | Lorca Deportiva | 0 | 0 | 0
3 | La Unión Atlético | 0 | 1 | 1

- Group champions: Águilas

=== Group 14 – Extremadura ===
Semi–finals
2 | Azuaga | 2 | 3 | 5
5 | Jerez | 1 | 0 | 1
3 | Moralo | 1 | 1 | 2
4 | Olivenza | 0 | 1 | 1

Final
2 | Azuaga | 2 | 1 | 3
3 | Moralo | 0 | 2 | 2

- Group champions: Llerenense

=== Group 15 – Navarre ===
Semi–finals
2 | Subiza | 4 | 3 | 7
5 | Huarte | 0 | 3 | 3
3 | Ardoi | 1 | 1 | 2
4 | Peña Sport | 2 | 2 | 4

Final
2 | Subiza | 2 | 5 | 7
4 | Peña Sport | 3 | 3 | 6

- Group champions: Valle de Egüés

=== Group 16 – La Rioja ===
Semi–finals
2 | Varea | 3 | 4 | 7
6 | Anguiano | 2 | 2 | 4
4 | La Calzada | 0 | 5 (a.e.t.) | 5
5 | Oyonesa | 0 | 2 | 2

Final
2 | Varea | 1 | 0 | 1
4 | La Calzada | 1 | 2 | 3

- Group champions: Náxara

=== Group 17 – Aragon ===
Semi–finals
3 | Huesca B | 1 | 1 | 2
6 | Almudévar | 2 | 3 | 5
4 | Ejea | 2 | 0 | 2
5 | Tamarite | 1 | 1 (a.e.t.) | 2

Final
4 | Ejea | 1 | 3 | 4
6 | Almudévar | 2 | 0 | 2

- Group champions: Robres, however, was relegated to Regional Preferente de Aragón due to CD Ebro's relegation from Segunda Federación. Barbastro occupied the promotion place of the group.

=== Group 18 – Castilla–La Mancha ===
Semi–finals
2 | Illescas | 1 | 0 | 1
5 | Villarrubia | 0 | 0 | 0
3 | Quintanar del Rey | 1 | 1 | 2
4 | Calvo Sotelo Puertollano | 1 | 0 | 1

Final
2 | Illescas | 3 | 2 | 5
3 | Quintanar del Rey | 2 | 0 | 2

- Group champions: Manchego Ciudad Real

== National stage ==
=== Qualified teams ===
| Group | Position | Team |
|---|---|---|
| 3 | 2nd | Vimenor |
| 5 | 2nd | **Sant Andreu** |
| 10 | 2nd | Córdoba B |
| 14 | 2nd | Azuaga |
| 15 | 2nd | Subiza |
| 18 | 2nd | **Illescas** |

| Group | Position | Team |
|---|---|---|
| 2 | 3rd | L'Entregu |
| 4 | 3rd | Leioa |
| 6 | 3rd | **Torrent** |
| 7 | 3rd | **Getafe B** |
| 8 | 3rd | Salamanca |
| 9 | 3rd | **El Palo** |
| 11 | 3rd | **Penya Independent** |
| 12 | 3rd | **San Fernando** |
| 13 | 3rd | **La Unión Atlético** |

| Group | Position | Team |
|---|---|---|
| 1 | 4th | **Racing Villalbés** |
| 16 | 4th | La Calzada |
| 17 | 4th | Ejea |

Bold indicates teams that were promoted

=== Matches ===
| Team 1 | Agg. | Team 2 | 1st leg | 2nd leg |
|---|---|---|---|---|
| Ejea | 1–3 (a.e.t.) | **Penya Independent** | 1–1 | 0–2 |
| **El Palo** | 4–1 | Subiza | 1–0 | 3–1 |
| Leioa | 2–4 (a.e.t.) | **San Fernando** | 2–0 | 0–4 |
| Azuaga | 1–4 | **Torrent** | 1–2 | 0–2 |
| **Racing Villalbés** | 4–1 | La Calzada | 1–1 | 3–0 |
| **La Unión Atlético** | 2–0 | L'Entregu | 0–0 | 2–0 |
| Córdoba B | 2–3 (a.e.t.) | **Getafe B** | 1–0 | 1–3 |
| **Illescas** | 2–1 | Vimenor | 1–0 | 1–1 |
| **Sant Andreu** | 3–2 | Salamanca | 1–1 | 2–1 |

First leg

| 28 May 2023 | **Leioa** | **2–0** | **San Fernando** | Leioa |
| 12:00 UTC+2 | Galarza 65'; Erik Tajada 77' | Report | | Stadium: Sarriena; Attendance: 600 |

| 28 May 2023 | **El Palo** | **1–0** | **Subiza** | Málaga |
| 12:00 UTC+2 | Javi López 21' | Report | | Stadium: San Ignacio; Attendance: 1,500 |

| 27 May 2023 | **Racing Villalbés** | **1–1** | **La Calzada** | Vilalba |
| 17:00 UTC+2 | Verez 13' | Report | Duce 40' | Stadium: A Magdalena; Attendance: 1,200 |

| 28 May 2023 | **La Unión Atlético** | **0–0** | **L'Entregu** | La Unión |
| 17:00 UTC+2 | | | | Stadium: Municipal de La Unión |

| 27 May 2023 | **Ejea** | **1–1** | **Penya Independent** | Ejea de los Caballeros |
| 18:00 UTC+2 | Crespo 38' | Report | Losada 58' | Stadium: Municipal de Ejea; Attendance: 1,100 |

| 28 May 2023 | **Córdoba B** | **1–0** | **Getafe B** | Córdoba |
| 18:00 UTC+2 | Abreu 30' | | | Stadium: Nuevo Arcángel |

| 27 May 2023 | **Illescas** | **1–0** | **Vimenor** | Illescas |
| 18:00 UTC+2 | Collazo 26' | Report | | Stadium: Municipal de Illescas; Attendance: 1,700 |

| 28 May 2023 | **Sant Andreu** | **1–1** | **Salamanca** | Barcelona |
| 18:00 UTC+2 | Carreón 19' | Report | Marco Túlio 45' | Stadium: Narcís Sala; Attendance: 4,619 |

| 27 May 2023 | **Azuaga** | **1–2** | **Torrent** | Azuaga |
| 19:00 UTC+2 | Chepe 79' | Report | Juanca 28'; A. Lois 67' | Stadium: Municipal de Deportes; Attendance: 900 |

Second leg

| 3 June 2023 | **La Calzada** | **0–3** (**1–4** agg.) | **Racing Villalbés** | Santo Domingo de la Calzada |
| 17:00 UTC+2 | | Report | Marcos 7'; A. Pérez 26'; Santi 90+3' | Stadium: El Rollo |

| 3 June 2023 | **Vimenor** | **1–1** (**1–2** agg.) | **Illescas** | Vioño de Piélagos |
| 18:00 UTC+2 | Sergio de Cos 87' | Report | Mingo 21' | Stadium: La Vidriera |

| 3 June 2023 | **Torrent** | **2–0** (**4–1** agg.) | **Azuaga** | Torrent |
| 19:00 UTC+2 | Ivi 32'; Zarzo 46' | Report | | Stadium: San Gregorio |

| 4 June 2023 | **Subiza** | **1–3** (**1–4** agg.) | **El Palo** | Subiza |
| 11:30 UTC+2 | Lulu 2' (o.g.) | Report | Javi López 17'; Iván Acosta 53'; Victor Vázquez 82' | Stadium: Sotoburu |

| 4 June 2023 | **Getafe B** | **3–1 (a.e.t.)** (**3–2** agg.) | **Córdoba B** | Getafe |
| 11:30 UTC+2 | Santi García 31', 107'; Diego López 77' | Report | Turmo 57' | Stadium: Ciudad Deportiva Getafe CF |

| 4 June 2023 | **Penya Independent** | **2–0 (a.e.t.)** (**3–1** agg.) | **Ejea** | Sant Miquel de Balansat |
| 12:00 UTC+2 | De La Cruz 114'; Rubio 120' | Report | | Stadium: Municipal de Sant Miquel |

| 4 June 2023 | **San Fernando** | **4–0 (a.e.t.)** (**4–2** agg.) | **Leioa** | Maspalomas |
| 13:00 UTC+2 | J. Rodríguez 41'; F. Quintero 46'; Jowi 101'; A. Betancort 119' | Report | | Stadium: Ciudad Deportiva |

| 4 June 2023 | **L'Entregu** | **0–2** (**0–2** agg.) | **La Unión Atlético** | L'Entregu |
| 17:00 UTC+2 | | Report | Sergio Giménez 75'; Juan Belencoso 88' | Stadium: Nuevo Nalón |

| 4 June 2023 | **Salamanca** | **1–2** (**2–3** agg.) | **Sant Andreu** | Villares de la Reina |
| 18:00 UTC+2 | Javi Navas 63' | Report | Genís 12'; D. Momoh 70' | Stadium: Helmántico |

== Promoted teams ==
- The 18 teams that were promoted through regular season groups are included.
- The numbers of years after the last promotion are referred to the last participation of the club in Segunda División B or Segunda Federación if the team was relegated one year ago.

Promoted to Segunda Federación
| Águilas (1 year later) | Andratx (1 year later) | Antoniano (First time ever) | Arandina (6 years later) | Barakaldo (2 years later) | Barbastro (16 years later) | Cayón (1 year later) | Covadonga (2 years later) | Deportivo Fabril (4 years later) |
| Valle de Egüés (First time ever) | El Palo (8 years later) | Europa (1 year later) | Getafe B (2 years later) | Illescas (First time ever) | La Unión Atlético (First time ever) | Llerenense (First time ever) | Manchego (First time ever) | Marbella (2 years later) |
| Mensajero (1 year later) | Náxara (1 year later) | Orihuela (2 years later) | Penya Independent (First time ever) | Racing Villalbés (First time ever) | Sant Andreu (8 years later) | San Fernando (1 year later) | Torrent (31 years later) | Ursaria (First time ever) |
