= 2024 Segunda Federación play-offs =

== Format ==
Twenty teams participated in the promotion play-off. Each of the five groups of the Segunda División RFEF are represented by the four teams that finished the regular season between the second and fifth positions. In the draw for the first stage, the participating teams were assigned to pots corresponding to their final regular season position. While avoiding matches between teams from the same regular season group, second-place finishers were drawn against fifth-place finishers while teams that finished third would play teams that finished fourth. The same draw process was repeated, to the extent that it would be possible, in the draw for the second round.

The five winning clubs of the second stage attained promotion to Primera RFEF and accompanied the five group champions who had already achieved their promotion.

The final two relegation spots (of 27 total) were also determined via play-offs. The four 13th-place finishers with the lowest point totals were drawn into two single-leg matches, with the winners securing survival in the Segunda División RFEF and the losers being relegated to the Tercera División RFEF. The two match-ups were selected through a random draw and hosted at a venue chosen from among the stadiums selected to host the promotion play-offs.

== Promotion play-offs ==
=== Teams ===
==== Participating teams ====
- Atlético Paso
- Badalona Futur
- Barakaldo
- Betis Deportivo
- Deportivo Aragón
- Europa
- Getafe B
- Guijuelo
- Lleida Esportiu
- UD Logroñés
- Marbella
- Numancia
- Orihuela
- Pontevedra
- Rayo Cantabria
- San Sebastián de los Reyes
- Sant Andreu
- Utebo
- Yeclano
- Zamora

==== Road to the play-offs ====
===== Group 1 =====
Pos	Team	Pld	W	D	L	GF	GA	GD	Pts	Qualification
2	Pontevedra	34	19	11	4	69	31	+38	**68**	Qualification for the promotion play-offs and Copa del Rey
3	Zamora (P)	34	17	12	5	42	21	+21	**63**	Qualification for the promotion play-offs and Copa del Rey
4	Guijuelo	34	14	9	11	36	34	+2	**51 (Note: Guijuelo finished ahead of Rayo Cantabria on head-to-head points: Guijuelo 2–1 Rayo Cantabria, Rayo Cantabria 1–2 Guijuelo)**	Qualification for the promotion play-offs and Copa del Rey
5	Rayo Cantabria	34	13	12	9	50	41	+9	**51**	Qualification for the promotion play-offs

Updated to match(es) played on 5 May 2024. Source:
Rules for classification: 1) points; 2) head-to-head points; 3) head-to-head goal difference; 4) goal difference; 5) number of goals scored
(P) Promoted

===== Group 2 =====
Pos	Team	Pld	W	D	L	GF	GA	GD	Pts	Qualification
2	Barakaldo (P)	34	22	10	2	61	19	+42	**76**	Qualification for the promotion play-offs and Copa del Rey
3	UD Logroñés	34	20	11	3	70	17	+53	**71**	Qualification for the promotion play-offs and Copa del Rey
4	Utebo	34	17	10	7	40	31	+9	**61**	Qualification for the promotion play-offs and Copa del Rey
5	Deportivo Aragón	34	15	11	8	51	40	+11	**56**	Qualification for the promotion play-offs

Updated to match(es) played on 5 May 2024. Source:
Rules for classification: 1) points; 2) head-to-head points; 3) head-to-head goal difference; 4) goal difference; 5) number of goals scored
(P) Promoted

===== Group 3 =====
Pos	Team	Pld	W	D	L	GF	GA	GD	Pts	Qualification
2	Europa	34	17	12	5	63	32	+31	**63**	Qualification for the promotion play-offs and Copa del Rey
3	Badalona Futur	34	16	11	7	42	25	+17	**59**	Qualification for the promotion play-offs and Copa del Rey
4	Sant Andreu	34	16	10	8	53	33	+20	**58 (Note: Sant Andreu finished ahead of Lleida Esportiu on head-to-head points: Sant Andreu 1–1 Lleida Esportiu, Lleida Esportiu 0–1 Sant Andreu)**	Qualification for the promotion play-offs and Copa del Rey
5	Lleida Esportiu	34	18	4	12	45	31	+14	**58**	Qualification for the promotion play-offs and Copa del Rey

Updated to match(es) played on 5 May 2024. Source:
Rules for classification: 1) points; 2) head-to-head points; 3) head-to-head goal difference; 4) goal difference; 5) number of goals scored
(Note: Head-to-head record is used only after all the matches between the teams in question have been played)

===== Group 4 =====
Pos	Team	Pld	W	D	L	GF	GA	GD	Pts	Qualification
2	Yeclano (P)	34	17	9	8	43	29	+14	**60**	Qualification for the promotion play-offs and Copa del Rey
3	Marbella (P)	34	16	8	10	41	32	+9	**56**	Qualification for the promotion play-offs and Copa del Rey
4	Orihuela	34	15	9	10	39	37	+2	**54**	Qualification for the promotion play-offs and Copa del Rey
5	Betis Deportivo (P)	34	13	14	7	44	28	+16	**53**	Qualification for the promotion play-offs

Updated to match(es) played on 5 May 2024. Source:
Rules for classification: 1) points; 2) head-to-head points; 3) head-to-head goal difference; 4) goal difference; 5) number of goals scored
(P) Promoted

===== Group 5 =====
Pos	Team	Pld	W	D	L	GF	GA	GD	Pts	Qualification
2	San Sebastián de los Reyes	34	16	13	5	61	26	+35	**61 (Note: Gimnástica Segoviana finished ahead of San Sebastián de los Reyes on head-to-head points: San Sebastián de los Reyes 0–0 Gimnástica Segoviana, Gimnástica Segoviana 1–0 San Sebastián de los Reyes)**	Qualification for the promotion play-offs and Copa del Rey
3	Numancia	34	18	6	10	51	39	+12	**60**	Qualification for the promotion play-offs and Copa del Rey
4	Getafe B	34	15	12	7	40	31	+9	**57**	Qualification for the promotion play-offs
5	Atlético Paso	34	15	11	8	28	21	+7	**56**	Qualification for the promotion play-offs and Copa del Rey

Updated to match(es) played on 5 May 2024. Source:
Rules for classification: 1) points; 2) head-to-head points; 3) head-to-head goal difference; 4) goal difference; 5) number of goals scored
(Note: Head-to-head record is used only after all the matches between the teams in question have been played)

=== First round ===
==== Qualified teams ====
Group	Position	Team
1	2nd	**Pontevedra**
2	2nd	**Barakaldo**
3	2nd	Europa
4	2nd	**Yeclano**
5	2nd	**San Sebastián de los Reyes**

Group	Position	Team
1	3rd	**Zamora**
2	3rd	**UD Logroñés**
3	3rd	Badalona Futur
4	3rd	**Marbella**
5	3rd	**Numancia**

Group	Position	Team
1	4th	Guijuelo
2	4th	Utebo
3	4th	Sant Andreu
4	4th	**Orihuela**
5	4th	Getafe B

Group	Position	Team
1	5th	Rayo Cantabria
2	5th	Deportivo Aragón
3	5th	Lleida Esportiu
4	5th	**Betis Deportivo**
5	5th	Atlético Paso

==== Matches ====
Team 1	Agg.	Team 2	1st leg	2nd leg
Europa	1–5	**Betis Deportivo**	0–2	1–3
**Yeclano**	3–0	Lleida Esportiu	1–0	2–0
**San Sebastián de los Reyes**	3–2 (a.e.t.)	Rayo Cantabria	2–2	1–0
**Barakaldo**	1–0	Atlético Paso	0–0	1–0
**Pontevedra**	4–3	Deportivo Aragón	1–2	3–1
**Numancia**	4–2	Utebo	2–2	2–0
**Marbella**	2–1	Getafe B	0–0	2–1
Badalona Futur	0–1	**Orihuela**	0–1	0–0
**UD Logroñés**	1–0	Guijuelo	0–0	1–0
**Zamora**	(s) 2–2	Sant Andreu	0–2	2–0

Bold indicates teams that advanced to the second round

First leg

11 May 2024	Guijuelo	**0–0**	UD Logroñés	Guijuelo
18:00 UTC+2				Stadium: Estadio Municipal Luis Ramos; Referee: Jesús López Fernández

12 May 2024	Getafe B	**0–0**	Marbella	Getafe
11:30 UTC+2				Stadium: Ciudad Deportiva Fernando Santos de la Parra; Referee: Gorka Mazo Maruri

12 May 2024	**Deportivo Aragón**	**2–1**	Pontevedra	Zaragoza
12:00 UTC+2	Barahona 70'; Vaquero 83'		Dalí 28'	Stadium: Estadio La Romareda; Referee: Pol Arenas Mora

12 May 2024	Rayo Cantabria	**2–2**	San Sebastián de los Reyes	Santander
12:00 UTC+2	González 26'; Campo 40'		Perero 22'; Esteban 77'	Stadium: Campos de Sport de El Sardinero; Referee: Eugenia Gil Soriano

12 May 2024	Atlético Paso	**0–0**	Barakaldo	El Paso
13:00 UTC+2				Stadium: Estadio Municipal de El Paso; Referee: Roberto Carralero Calvo

12 May 2024	**Betis Deportivo**	**2–0**	Europa	Seville
17:30 UTC+2	Mensah 2'; Faye 71'			Stadium: Ciudad Deportiva Luis del Sol; Referee: Federico Javier Saiz de Villares

12 May 2024	Utebo	**2–2**	Numancia	Utebo
18:00 UTC+2	Pérez 35'; Ballarín 90'		González 29'; Sanchidrián 51'	Stadium: Estadio de Santa Ana; Referee: Marcelo Ibáñez Juárez

12 May 2024	**Sant Andreu**	**2–0**	Zamora	Barcelona
18:05 UTC+2	Paredes 11', 37'			Stadium: Camp Municipal Narcís Sala; Referee: Héctor Bouzas Laconti

12 May 2024	Lleida Esportiu	**0–1**	**Yeclano**	Lleida
19:00 UTC+2			Clemente 74'	Stadium: Camp d'Esports; Referee: Manuel Ramírez Marco

12 May 2024	**Orihuela**	**1–0**	Badalona Futur	Orihuela
19:00 UTC+2	Kamal 32'			Stadium: Estadio Municipal Los Arcos; Referee: Alberto Sevillano Marín

Second leg

18 May 2024	**San Sebastián de los Reyes**	**1–0** (**3–2** agg.)	Rayo Cantabria	San Sebastián de los Reyes
17:00 UTC+2	Ballesteros 100'			Stadium: Estadio Municipal Nuevo Matapiñonera; Referee: Daniel Clemente Manrique

18 May 2024	**Barakaldo**	**1–0** (**1–0** agg.)	Atlético Paso	Barakaldo
18:00 UTC+2	Bittor 40'			Stadium: Estadio de Lasesarre; Referee: Leandro Carbajales Gómez

19 May 2024	Europa	**1–3** (**1–5** agg.)	**Betis Deportivo**	Barcelona
12:00 UTC+2	Servetti 29'		Rodríguez 37'; Senhadji 67'; Fernández 90+4'	Stadium: Camp Municipal Nou Sardenya; Referee: Millán Bárcenas Torres

19 May 2024	Badalona Futur	**0–0** (**0–1** agg.)	Orihuela	Vic
18:00 UTC+2				Stadium: Estadi Hipòlit Planás; Referee: David Casabona Isla

19 May 2024	**UD Logroñés**	**1–0** (**1–0** agg.)	Guijuelo	Logroño
18:00 UTC+2	Ugarte 45'			Stadium: Estadio Las Gaunas; Referee: Sergi Carrero Romera

19 May 2024	**Pontevedra**	**3–1** (**4–3** agg.)	Deportivo Aragón	Pontevedra
18:00 UTC+2	Pino 38'; Calvo 66', 90'		Sans 9'	Stadium: Estadio Municipal de Pasarón; Referee: Francisco Crespo Puente

19 May 2024	**Marbella**	**2–1** (**2–1** agg.)	Getafe B	Marbella
18:00 UTC+2	Dago 47'; Gato 81'		Conesa 66'	Stadium: Dama de Noche Football Pitches; Referee: Fernando Moreno Osuna

19 May 2024	**Numancia**	**2–0** (**4–2** agg.)	Utebo	Soria
18:00 UTC+2	Royo 28'; González 90'			Stadium: Nuevo Estadio Los Pajaritos; Referee: Luis Enrique Morona del Campo

19 May 2024	**Yeclano**	**2–0** (**3–0** agg.)	Lleida Esportiu	Yecla
19:00 UTC+2	Olmedo 80', 89'			Stadium: Estadio La Constitución; Referee: Daniel Miranda Bolaño

19 May 2024	**Zamora**	**2–0** (**2–2** agg.)	Sant Andreu	Zamora
19:30 UTC+2	Castillo 28' (own); Cañizo 43'			Stadium: Estadio Ruta de la Plata; Referee: Víctor Manuel Broncano Suárez

=== Second round ===
==== Qualified teams ====
Group	Position	Team
1	2nd	Pontevedra
2	2nd	**Barakaldo**
4	2nd	**Yeclano**
5	2nd	San Sebastián de los Reyes

Group	Position	Team
1	3rd	**Zamora**
2	3rd	UD Logroñés
4	3rd	**Marbella**
5	3rd	Numancia

Group	Position	Team
4	4th	Orihuela

Group	Position	Team
4	5th	**Betis Deportivo**

Bold indicates teams that were promoted

==== Matches ====
Team 1	Agg.	Team 2	1st leg	2nd leg
Pontevedra	1–2	**Betis Deportivo**	0–1	1–1
**Barakaldo**	3–3 (seed)	Orihuela	1–3	2–0
San Sebastián de los Reyes	1–2	**Zamora**	1–1	0–1
UD Logroñés	0–2	**Marbella**	0–1	0–1
**Yeclano**	3–3 (seed)	Numancia	1–2	2–1

Bold indicates teams that were promoted

First leg

26 May 2024	**Numancia**	**2–1**	Yeclano	Soria
18:00 UTC+2	David Alfonso 2'; Ribeiro 29'		Serpeta 39'	Stadium: Nuevo Estadio Los Pajaritos; Referee: Alfredo Ramo Andrés

26 May 2024	**Betis Deportivo**	**1–0**	Pontevedra	Seville
19:00 UTC+2	Rodríguez 20'			Stadium: Estadio Benito Villamarín; Referee: Juan Francisco Roca Roblés

26 May 2024	**Marbella**	**1–0**	UD Logroñés	Marbella
19:00 UTC+2	Puñal 44'			Stadium: Dama de Noche Football Pitches; Referee: Alejandro Clemente Ortuño

26 May 2024	**Orihuela**	**3–1**	Barakaldo	Orihuela
19:30 UTC+2	García 14'; De las Cuevas 41'; Revilla 56'		Bujan 54'	Stadium: Estadio Municipal Los Arcos; Referee: Aleksandar Ivaylov Angelov Borisov

26 May 2024	Zamora	**1–1**	San Sebastián de los Reyes	Zamora
19:30 UTC+2	Mancebo 13'		Pareja 83'	Stadium: Estadio Ruta de la Plata; Referee: Álvaro Juncal Moreira

Second leg

1 June 2024	**Barakaldo**	**2–0** (**3–3** agg.)	Orihuela	Barakaldo
18:30 UTC+2	Pedernales 7'; García 63'			Stadium: Estadio de Lasesarre

2 June 2024	San Sebastián de los Reyes	**0–1** (**1–2** agg.)	**Zamora**	San Sebastián de los Reyes
17:00 UTC+2			Luis 59'	Stadium: Estadio Municipal Nuevo Matapiñonera

2 June 2024	UD Logroñés	**0–1** (**0–2** agg.)	**Marbella**	Logroño
18:00 UTC+2			Dago 69'	Stadium: Estadio Las Gaunas

2 June 2024	Pontevedra	**1–1** (**1–2** agg.)	Betis Deportivo	Pontevedra
18:00 UTC+2	Sánchez 87'		Rodríguez 74'	Stadium: Estadio Municipal de Pasarón

2 June 2024	**Yeclano**	**2–1** (a.e.t.) (**3–3** agg.)	Numancia	Yecla
19:00 UTC+2	Satoca 40'; Sanchis 61'		González 19'	Stadium: Estadio La Constitución

== Promoted teams ==
- The five teams that were or would be promoted to Primera Federación through regular season groups and the five play-off winners were included.
- The number of years after the last participation of the club in the third tier is referred to the previous appearance at that level. Depending on the time, it could have been Tercera División (until 1977), Segunda División B (1977–2021) or Primera Federación (2021–present).

Promoted to Primera Federación
Group 1	Group 2	Group 3	Group 4	Group 5
Ourense CF (1st) (First time ever)	Bilbao Athletic (1st) (1 year later)	Hércules (1st) (3 years later)	Sevilla Atlético (1st) (2 years later)	Gimnástica Segoviana (1st) (6 years later)
Zamora (3rd) (2 years later)	Barakaldo (2nd) (3 years later)		Yeclano (2nd) (3 years later)	
			Marbella (3rd) (3 years later)	
			Betis Deportivo (4th) (2 years later)	

== Relegation play-offs ==
=== Table of 13th-placed teams ===
Pos	Team	Pld	W	D	L	GF	GA	GD	Pts	Qualification or relegation
1	Illescas	34	11	11	12	34	32	+2	44	
2	Formentera (R)	34	12	8	14	40	42	−2	44	Qualification for the relegation play-offs
3	Avilés Industrial (O)	34	9	14	11	40	38	+2	41	Qualification for the relegation play-offs
4	Manchego (R)	34	9	14	11	29	36	−7	41	Qualification for the relegation play-offs
5	Izarra (O)	34	10	6	18	32	51	−19	36	Qualification for the relegation play-offs

Updated to match(es) played on 5 May 2024. Source:
Rules for classification: 1) points; 2) goal difference; 3) number of goals scored
(O) Play-off winners; (R) Relegated

=== Qualified teams ===
Group	Position	Team
1	13th	Avilés Industrial
2	13th	Izarra
3	13th	Formentera
4	13th	Manchego

=== Matches ===
Team 1	Agg.	Team 2	1st leg	2nd leg
Formentera	0–2	Izarra	0–1	0–1
Manchego	0–1	Avilés Industrial	0–0	0–1

First leg

12 May 2024	Formentera	0–1	Izarra	Sant Francesc Xavier
12:00 UTC+2			Arbeloa 19'	Stadium: Estadi Municipal de Sant Francesc

12 May 2024	Manchego	0–0	Avilés Industrial	Ciudad Real
12:00 UTC+2				Stadium: Estadio Rey Juan Carlos I

Second leg

19 May 2024	Izarra	1–0 (2–0 agg.)	Formentera	Estella-Lizarra
12:00 UTC+2	Arbeloa 40'			Stadium: Estadio Merkatondoa

19 May 2024	Avilés Industrial	1–0 (1–0 agg.)	Manchego	Avilés
18:00 UTC+2	Natalio 58'			Stadium: Estadio Román Suárez Puerta

Relegated to Tercera Federación
Formentera	Manchego

== Relegated teams ==
- 27 teams relegated to Tercera Federación: 25 teams through regular season groups and the two play-off losers.
- The numbers of years after the last relegation are referred to the last participation of the club in Tercera División or Tercera Federación if the team was promoted in the last two years.

Relegated to Tercera Federación
Racing Villalbés (1 year later)	Arandina (1 year later)	Oviedo Vetusta (2 years later)	Cayón (1 year later)	Covadonga (1 year later)	San Juan (3 years later)
Mutilvera (4 years later)	Náxara (1 year later)	Valle de Egüés (1 year later)	Brea (3 years later)	Atlético Saguntino (2 years later)	Cerdanyola del Vallès (3 years later)
Penya Independent (1 year later)	Manresa (2 years later)	La Nucía (5 years later)	Racing Cartagena MM (3 years later)	San Roque Lepe (3 years later)	El Palo (1 year later)
Vélez (3 years later)	Cartagena B (2 years later)	Llerenense (1 year later)	Badajoz (7 years later)	San Fernando (1 year later)	Mensajero (1 year later)
Montijo (3 years later)		Formentera (6 years later)		Manchego (1 year later)	
