= CD Brea =

Association football club in Spain

Brea
- Full name: Club Deportivo Brea
- Founded: 1971
- Ground: Municipal de Piedrabuena, Brea de Aragón, Aragón, Spain
- Capacity: 2,000
- Chairman: (Spain) Carlos Arantegui
- Manager: (Spain) Dani Martínez
- League: Tercera Federación – Group 17
- 2025–26: Regional Preferente – Group 2, 1st of 18 (champions)
Home colours	Away colours

Club Deportivo Brea is a Spanish football team based in Brea de Aragón in the community of Aragón. Founded in 1971, the club plays in the Tercera Federación – Group 17.

== Season to season ==
Season	Tier	Division	Place	Copa del Rey
1974–75	6	2ª Reg. P.	2nd	
1975–76	5	1ª Reg.	20th	
1976–77	6	2ª Reg. P.	10th	
1977–78	6	1ª Reg.	9th	
1978–79	6	1ª Reg.	7th	
1979–80	6	1ª Reg.	6th	
1980–81	6	1ª Reg.	2nd	
1981–82	5	Reg. Pref.	5th	
1982–83	5	Reg. Pref.	16th	
1983–84	5	Reg. Pref.	9th	
1984–85	5	Reg. Pref.	13th	
1985–86	5	Reg. Pref.	18th	
1986–87	5	Reg. Pref.	6th	
1987–88	5	Reg. Pref.	11th	
1988–89	5	Reg. Pref.	12th	
1989–90	5	Reg. Pref.	9th	
1990–91	5	Reg. Pref.	15th	
1991–92	6	1ª Reg.	3rd	
1992–93	5	Reg. Pref.	11th	
1993–94	5	Reg. Pref.	7th	

Season	Tier	Division	Place	Copa del Rey
1994–95	5	Reg. Pref.	14th	
1995–96	5	Reg. Pref.	8th	
1996–97	5	Reg. Pref.	17th	
1997–98	6	1ª Reg.	8th	
1998–99	6	1ª Reg.	4th	
1999–2000	6	1ª Reg.	3rd	
2000–01	6	1ª Reg.	9th	
2001–02	6	1ª Reg.	1st	
2002–03	5	Reg. Pref.	8th	
2003–04	5	Reg. Pref.	7th	
2004–05	5	Reg. Pref.	13th	
2005–06	5	Reg. Pref.	6th	
2006–07	5	Reg. Pref.	2nd	
2007–08	4	3ª	15th	
2008–09	4	3ª	20th	
2009–10	5	Reg. Pref.	4th	
2010–11	5	Reg. Pref.	5th	
2011–12	5	Reg. Pref.	8th	
2012–13	5	Reg. Pref.	1st	
2013–14	4	3ª	17th	

Season	Tier	Division	Place	Copa del Rey
2014–15	5	Reg. Pref.	4th	
2015–16	5	Reg. Pref.	2nd	
2016–17	4	3ª	12th	
2017–18	4	3ª	10th	
2018–19	4	3ª	7th	
2019–20	4	3ª	3rd	
2020–21	4	3ª	1st / 2nd	
2021–22	4	2ª RFEF	10th	First round
2022–23	4	2ª Fed.	12th	
2023–24	4	2ª Fed.	18th	
2024–25	5	3ª Fed.	17th	
2025–26	6	Reg. Pref.	1st	
2026–27	5	3ª Fed.		

- 3 seasons in Segunda Federación/Segunda División RFEF
- 8 seasons in Tercera División
- 2 seasons in Tercera Federación
