= Imanol de la Sota =

Spanish football manager (born 1975)

Personal information
- Full name: Imanol de la Sota Aberasturi
- Date of birth: 2 April 1975 (age 51)
- Place of birth: Santurtzi, Spain

Team information
- Current team: Barakaldo (manager)

Managerial career
- Years: Team
- Santurtzi (youth)
- 2000–2002: Barakaldo (youth)
- 20XX–2011: Durango (youth)
- 2012–2013: Iurretako (assistant)
- 2013–2015: Durango
- 2015–2016: Athletic Bilbao (youth)
- 2016–2017: Basconia (assistant)
- 2017–2019: Eibar (youth)
- 2019–2021: Athletic Bilbao (youth)
- 2021: Bilbao Athletic
- 2022–: Barakaldo

Imanol de la Sota Aberasturi (born 2 April 1975) is a Spanish football manager, currently in charge of Barakaldo.

== Career ==
Born in Santurtzi, Biscay, Basque Country, de la Sota began his managerial career with the youth sides of hometown club Santurtzi. He subsequently worked under the same capacity at Barakaldo and Durango, before becoming an assistant of Durango's farm team Iurretako in the 2012–13 season.

On 20 May 2013, de la Sota was appointed manager of Durango's main squad in Tercera División. In June 2015, he joined the structure of Athletic Bilbao, being named in charge of the Juvenil A team.

Ahead of the 2016–17 campaign, de la Sota became Joseba Etxeberria's assistant at Basconia, but left the club on 5 July 2017 to take over the Juvenil A team of Eibar. He returned to the Lezama Facilities on 14 June 2019, after again being appointed manager of the Juvenil squad.

On 7 June 2021, de la Sota was named at the helm of Bilbao Athletic in Primera División RFEF. On 13 December, after only two wins into the season, he was sacked.

On 22 June 2022, de la Sota returned to Barakaldo, after being appointed manager of the first team in Tercera Federación. The following 8 May, after achieving promotion to Segunda Federación, he renewed his contract for a further year, and led the club to a second successive promotion before agreeing to a new one-year extension on 11 June 2024.

On 5 June 2025, after achieving an 11th placed finish in Primera Federación, de la Sota signed a new one-year deal with Baraka. On 8 June of the following year, after qualifying the club to the Copa del Rey, he renewed his link for a further campaign.

== Managerial statistics ==
As of 14 November 2026

Managerial record by team and tenure
Team	Nat	From	To	Record								Ref
Team	Nat	From	To	G	W	D	L	GF	GA	GD	Win %	Ref
Durango	(Spain)	20 May 2013	16 June 2015	78	34	16	28	97	90	+7	43.59	
Bilbao Athletic	(Spain)	7 June 2021	13 December 2021	16	2	7	7	13	21	−8	12.50	
Barakaldo	(Spain)	22 June 2022	Present	159	79	48	32	248	130	+118	49.69	
Total				253	115	71	67	358	241	+117	45.45	—
