= Juan Carlos Socorro =

Venezuelan footballer (born 1972)

Personal information
- Full name: Juan Carlos Socorro Vera
- Date of birth: 13 May 1972 (age 54)
- Place of birth: Caracas, Venezuela
- Height: 1.76 m (5 ft 9 1/2 in)
- Position: Midfielder

Team information
- Current team: Lanzarote (manager)

Senior career*
Years	Team	Apps	(Gls)
1990–1991	Las Palmas B	35	(9)
1991–2002	Las Palmas	236	(40)
2000–2001	→ Elche (loan)	29	(1)
2003–2004	Universidad LP	49	(5)
2004–2005	Deportivo Italia	13	(1)
2005–2006	Gáldar		
Total		362	(56)

International career
1996–1997	Venezuela	5	(0)

Managerial career
- 2011–2014: Las Palmas (assistant)
- 2015–2022: Panadería Pulido
- 2022–2024: San Fernando
- 2024–: Lanzarote
- * Club domestic league appearances and goals

Juan Carlos Socorro Vera (born 13 May 1972) is a Venezuelan retired footballer who played as a midfielder, currently manager of Tercera Federación club UD Lanzarote.

== Club career ==
Save for one season, Caracas-born Socorro spent his entire professional career in Spain, almost always in the Canary Islands. He started in 1991 with UD Las Palmas which would be his main club (ten and a half years), playing one match in the Segunda División in the 1991–92 campaign and suffering relegation.

In the following four seasons, Socorro featured regularly for the team, who achieved promotion from Segunda División B in 1996 after three unsuccessful playoff visits. In 1999–2000 he contributed 17 appearances – only two starts – as they returned to La Liga after an absence of 12 years, spending the following year on loan to another side in the second tier, Elche CF.

Socorro's only season in the top flight was 2001–02, but he appeared in only five league games and was relegated. In January 2003 he moved to lowly Universidad de Las Palmas CF and, subsequently, played one year in his country of birth with Deportivo Italia. After one season with UD Gáldar he retired from football at the age of 34, with 286 competitive appearances for Las Palmas.

== International career ==
Socorro won five caps for Venezuela in one year. He was selected to the squad that appeared in the 1997 Copa América in Bolivia, as the national team finished bottom of their group with three losses and no goals scored.
