= Diego Morcillo =

Spanish footballer (born 2003)

Personal information
- Full name: Diego Morcillo Muñoz
- Date of birth: 18 June 2003 (age 23)
- Place of birth: Madrid, Spain
- Height: 1.85 m (6 ft 1 in)
- Position: Forward

Youth career
- Esperanza
- Sporting Hortaleza
- 2019–2022: Rayo Vallecano

Senior career*
Years	Team	Apps	(Gls)
2022–2024	Guadalajara	52	(18)
2024–2026	Alavés B	56	(12)
2025	Alavés	1	(0)
- * Club domestic league appearances and goals as of 17 May 2026

Diego Morcillo Muñoz (born 18 June 2003) is a Spanish footballer who plays as a forward.

== Career ==
Born in Madrid, Morcillo began his career with hometown side AD Esperanza, and later played for AD Sporting Hortaleza and Rayo Vallecano as a youth. On 19 July 2022, he departed the latter side and signed for Segunda Federación side CD Guadalajara.

On 29 June 2023, Morcillo renewed his contract with Depor for a further year. He finished the season as top scorer of their group with 18 goals, but moved to Deportivo Alavés on 17 July 2024, being initially assigned to the reserves also in the fourth division.

Morcillo made his first team debut on 30 October 2025; after coming on as a second-half substitute for Pablo Ibáñez, he scored Alavés' sixth goal in a 7–0 away routing of CD Getxo, for the campaign's Copa del Rey. He made his professional – and La Liga – debut nine days later, replacing Denis Suárez late into a 1–0 away loss to Girona FC.
