= Ramsés Gil =

Spanish football manager

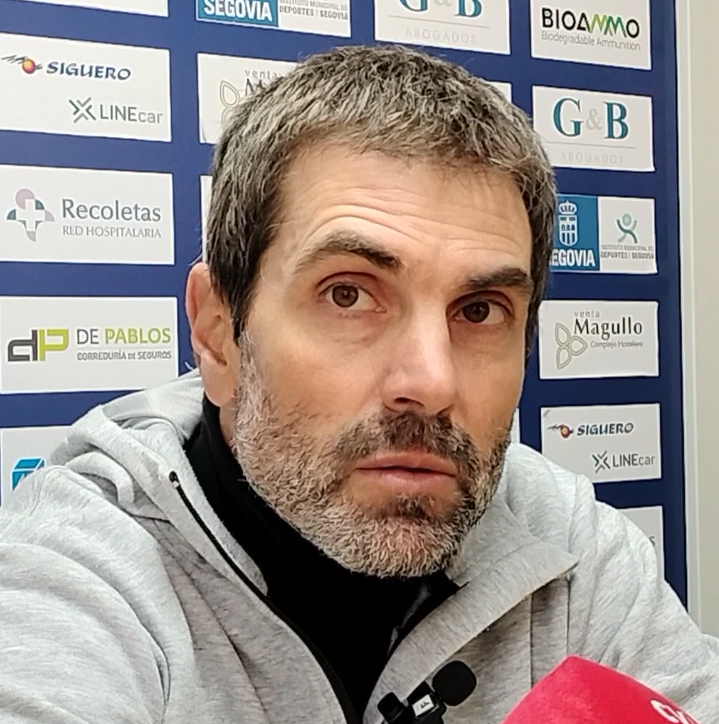
- Gil in 2024

Personal information
- Full name: Francisco Ramsés Gil Tordesillas
- Date of birth: 28 June 1976 (age 50)
- Place of birth: Segovia, Spain
- Height: 1.70 m (5 ft 7 in)
- Position: Right-back

Team information
- Current team: Real Unión (manager)

Senior career*
| Years | Team | Apps | (Gls) |
| 1995–1996 | La Granja | | |
| 1996–1999 | Gimnástica Segoviana | | |
| 1999–2000 | Getafe | 0 | (0) |
| 2000–2012 | Gimnástica Segoviana | | |

Managerial career
- 2022–2025: Gimnástica Segoviana
- 2025–: Real Unión
- * Club domestic league appearances and goals

Francisco Ramsés Gil Tordesillas (born 28 June 1976) is a Spanish football manager and former player who played as a right-back. He is the current manager of Real Unión.

== Playing career ==
Born in Segovia, Castile and León, Gil made his senior debut with CD La Granja before moving to hometown side Gimnástica Segoviana CF in 1996. In 1999, after achieving promotion to Segunda División B with the latter, he joined Getafe CF.

In 2000, Gil returned to Segoviana after making no appearances for Geta, with the club now back in Tercera División. He was regularly used for the club in the following years, becoming team captain and achieving another promotion to the third level in 2011.

On 15 February 2012, after being rarely used during the campaign, Gil left Segoviana due to "sporting reasons"; he later retired at the age of 35.

== Managerial career ==
Shortly after retiring, Gil returned to Gimnástica Segoviana as a sporting director. He was also an assistant during the 2018–19 season, before leaving the club on 30 July 2020.

On 13 March 2022, Gil returned to Segoviana after being named manager of the club in the place of Manu González. On 30 May, after avoiding relegation from Segunda División RFEF, he renewed his contract with the club.

Gil led Segoviana to the top of their group in the 2023–24 Segunda Federación, achieving promotion to Primera Federación. On 26 May 2025, after suffering relegation, he announced his departure from the club, and took over Real Unión in the fourth division on 13 June.

On 19 May 2026, after helping the side to achieve promotion to division three after winning their group, Gil renewed his link with the Txuri-beltz for a further year.

== Managerial statistics ==
As of 14 November 2026

Managerial record by team and tenure
| Team | Nat | From | To | Record | | | | | | | | Ref |
| Team | Nat | From | To | G | W | D | L | GF | GA | GD | Win % | Ref |
|---|---|---|---|---|---|---|---|---|---|---|---|---|
| Gimnástica Segoviana | (Spain) | 13 March 2022 | 26 May 2025 | 120 | 46 | 36 | 38 | 157 | 161 | −4 | 38.33 | |
| Real Unión | (Spain) | 13 June 2025 | Present | 46 | 24 | 13 | 9 | 84 | 54 | +30 | 52.17 | |
| Total | | | | 166 | 70 | 49 | 47 | 241 | 215 | +26 | 42.17 | — |
