= Antonio Fernández (footballer, born 1978) =

Spanish footballer and manager

Personal information
- Full name: Antonio Fernández Rivadulla
- Date of birth: 29 January 1978 (age 48)
- Place of birth: Ourense, Spain
- Position: Midfielder

Youth career
- Pontevedra
- 1996–1997: Deportivo La Coruña

Senior career*
Years	Team	Apps	(Gls)
1995–1996	Villalonga		
1997–2000	Lalín	57	(10)
2000–2001	O Grove		
2001–2002	Xove Lago		
2002–2003	Villarrobledo		
2003–2004	Granada		
2004–2005	Torredonjimeno		
2005–2006	Granada Atlético	34	(7)
2006–2007	Guadalajara		
2007	Portonovo	10	(0)
2007–2008	Motril	37	(8)
2008–2011	Ourense	102	(8)
2011–2012	Pontevedra	26	(1)
2012	Céltiga	13	(2)
2012–2013	Boiro	21	(2)
2013–2014	Villalonga	24	(9)
Total		324	(47)

Managerial career
- 2014–2017: Villalonga
- 2017–2019: Alondras
- 2019–2022: San Roque Lepe
- 2022–2023: Pontevedra
- 2024: Linense
- 2025: Xerez Deportivo
- * Club domestic league appearances and goals

Antonio Fernández Rivadulla (born 29 January 1978), known as Antonio Fernández, is a Spanish retired footballer who played as a central midfielder, and is a current manager.

== Playing career ==
Known as just Antonio during his playing days, he was born in Ourense, Galicia, and made his senior debut with Tercera División side Villalonga FC at the age of 17. In 1996, he was transferred to Deportivo de La Coruña for an undisclosed sum plus a friendly match, and returned to youth football.

Antonio featured mainly in the fourth tier during his entire career; aside from a one-year spell in Segunda División B with CD Lalín in the 1998–99 season, he played for USD O Grove, UD Xove Lago, CP Villarrobledo, Granada CF, Torredonjimeno CF, Granada Atlético CF, CD Guadalajara, Portonovo SD, Motril CF, CD Ourense, Pontevedra CF, Céltiga FC and CD Boiro.

On 29 August 2013, Antonio returned to his first club Villalonga, now in the Preferente Autonómica. He officially retired on 11 December 2014, aged 36, after being appointed manager of the club.

== Coaching career ==
On 3 December 2014, whilst playing for Villalonga, Fernández was named as interim manager following the sacking of Óscar García; eight days later, he was permanently appointed manager, and subsequently retired from playing. He achieved promotion to the fourth division in 2016, and on 30 May 2017, after leading Villalonga to an 8th-place finish, he left to become manager of fellow league team Alondras CF.

On 20 June 2019, after leading Alondras to two consecutive play-off qualifications, albeit without promotion to the Segunda División B on both occasions, Fernández left the club. On 27 October, he was named in charge of CD San Roque de Lepe also in the fourth tier.

Ferández led San Roque to promotion during the 2020–21 campaign, and left the club on 6 July 2022, after a sixth-place finish in the season, to take over Primera Federación side Pontevedra. On 18 January 2023, however, he was sacked by Ponte after three losses in a row.

On 6 March 2024, after more than a year of inactivity, Fernández was appointed at the helm of Segunda Federación side Real Balompédica Linense on a contract until the end of the campaign; he replaced sacked Mere. On 16 May 2024, Fernández left Balona as his contract was not renewed for next season.

On 10 February 2025, Fernández returned to management after nearly nine months without a club as he was named as the new manager of fellow fourth division side, Xerez Deportivo FC on a deal until the end of the campaign; he replaced David Sánchez, who had been sacked a day earlier. On 9 May 2025, Fernández renewed his contract for a further year ahead of the 2025–26 campaign. On 26 October 2025, Fernández was sacked by Xerez Deportivo following a poor start to the season.

== Personal life ==
Fernández's father, also named Antonio, was also a footballer. A forward, he featured in one Segunda División match for Ourense, and also played for Pontevedra and Lalín.

== Managerial statistics ==
As of 25 October 2025

Managerial record by team and tenure
Team	Nat	From	To	Record								Ref
Team	Nat	From	To	G	W	D	L	GF	GA	GD	Win %	Ref
Villalonga	(Spain)	3 December 2014	30 May 2017	100	54	23	23	151	82	+69	54.00	
Alondras	(Spain)	30 May 2017	20 June 2019	82	41	19	22	115	79	+36	50.00	
San Roque Lepe	(Spain)	27 October 2019	6 July 2022	80	39	19	22	101	71	+30	48.75	
Pontevedra	(Spain)	6 July 2022	18 January 2023	22	6	6	10	19	24	−5	27.27	
Linense	(Spain)	6 March 2024	16 May 2024	9	3	3	3	10	9	+1	33.33	
Xerez Deportivo	(Spain)	10 February 2025	26 October 2025	20	6	5	9	21	31	−10	30.00	
Total				313	149	75	89	417	296	+121	47.60	—

== Honours ==
=== Manager ===
Villalonga

- Preferente de Galicia: 2015–16
