= Diego Martínez (footballer, born February 1984) =

Spanish football manager (born 1984)

Personal information
- Full name: Diego Martínez Ruiz
- Date of birth: 4 February 1984 (age 42)
- Place of birth: Logroño, Spain
- Position: Goalkeeper

Youth career
- Loyola

Senior career*
Years	Team	Apps	(Gls)
- Loyola
- Agoncillo

Managerial career
- Loyola (youth)
- Deportivo La Coruña (youth)
- 2009–2014: Zaragoza (youth)
- 2014–2015: Arnedo
- 2015–2018: Náxara
- 2019: Izarra
- 2020–2021: Calahorra
- 2021–2022: Numancia
- 2023–2024: Logroñés
- * Club domestic league appearances and goals

Diego Martínez Ruiz (born 4 February 1984) is a Spanish former footballer who played as a goalkeeper, and a manager.

== Career ==
Martínez was born in Logroño, La Rioja, and played as a senior for SD Loyola and CD Agoncillo. He began his managerial career with Loyola's youth sides, later moving to La Coruña to study and taking over the youth categories of Deportivo de La Coruña before joining the structure of Real Zaragoza in 2009.

In March 2014, Martínez was sacked from Zaragoza's Juvenil squad, and had his first senior experience later in the year, after being named manager of Tercera División side CD Arnedo. In May 2015, he left the latter club to take over fellow league team Náxara CD.

On 15 June 2018, after missing out promotion in the play-offs on his three seasons in charge of the club, Martínez left Náxara. The following 12 March, he was named in charge of CD Izarra in Segunda División B, and managed to avoid relegation with the side before leaving on 5 June 2019.

On 18 February 2020, Martínez was appointed manager of CD Calahorra also in the third division. He led the club to the play-offs in 2021, but lost to Burgos CF in the first round; on 18 May of that year, he opted to leave after refusing a new deal.

On 22 June 2021, Martínez was named CD Numancia manager, and led the club to promotion to Primera Federación in his first year. On 7 November 2022, after a 4–1 loss to CD Atlético Baleares, he was sacked.

On 6 July 2023, Martínez was appointed manager of fourth tier side UD Logroñés.

== Managerial statistics ==
As of 2 June 2024

Managerial record by team and tenure
Team	Nat	From	To	Record								Ref
Team	Nat	From	To	G	W	D	L	GF	GA	GD	Win %	Ref
Arnedo	(Spain)	30 September 2014	28 May 2015	32	8	7	17	28	39	−11	25.00	
Náxara	(Spain)	28 May 2015	15 June 2018	126	87	23	16	338	122	+216	69.05	
Izarra	(Spain)	12 March 2019	5 June 2019	10	4	5	1	13	7	+6	40.00	
Calahorra	(Spain)	18 February 2020	18 May 2021	29	11	12	6	24	15	+9	37.93	
Numancia	(Spain)	22 June 2021	7 November 2022	46	20	15	11	51	35	+16	43.48	
Logroñés	(Spain)	6 July 2023	Present	43	24	12	7	80	25	+55	55.81	
Total				286	154	74	58	534	243	+291	53.85	—
