= CDE Ursaria =

Spanish football team

Ursaria
- Full name: Club Deportivo Elemental Ursaria
- Founded: 2 July 2007; 19 years ago
- Dissolved: 2024
- Ground: La Dehesa, Cobeña, Madrid, Spain
- Capacity: 1,500
- President: Ricardo Badoer
- Head coach: Joselu Méndez
- 2023–24: Segunda Federación – Group 5, 12th of 18 (administratively relegated)
Home colours	Away colours

Club Deportivo Elemental Ursaria was a Spanish football team based in Madrid. Founded in 2007, it held home matches at Estadio Polideportivo La Dehesa, with a capacity of 1,500 people.

== History ==
Founded in 2007 as Club Deportivo Latina by Manolo Blázquez, the club changed name to Club Deportivo Ursaria in June 2018, after being acquired by businessman Ricardo Badoer. In the first season under the new ownership, the club achieved promotion to the Preferente de Madrid, and in 2021, the club achieved their first-ever promotion to the Tercera División RFEF.

On 23 April 2023, Ursaria achieved promotion to Segunda Federación after a 3–0 win over AD Torrejón CF, and RSC Internacional FC's defeat; the club finished first in their group of the 2022–23 Tercera Federación, and also qualified to the 2023–24 Copa del Rey.

Despite finishing 12th, Ursaria suffered administrative relegation in July 2024, and later failed to comply with the requirements to play in the fifth tier.

== Season to season ==
Season	Tier	Division	Place	Copa del Rey
2007–08	8	3ª Reg.	5th	
2008–09	8	3ª Reg.	1st	
2009–10	7	2ª Afic.	6th	
2010–11	7	2ª Afic.	7th	
2011–12	7	2ª Afic.	6th	
2012–13	7	2ª Afic.	1st	
2013–14	6	1ª Afic.	6th	
2014–15	6	1ª Afic.	1st	
2015–16	5	Pref.	9th	

Season	Tier	Division	Place	Copa del Rey
2016–17	5	Pref.	12th	
2017–18	5	Pref.	17th	
2018–19	6	1ª Afic.	1st	
2019–20	5	Pref.	11th	
2020–21	5	Pref.	1st	
2021–22	5	3ª RFEF	6th	
2022–23	5	3ª Fed.	1st	
2023–24	4	2ª Fed.	12th	First round

- 1 season in Segunda Federación
- 3 seasons in Tercera Federación/Tercera División RFEF
