= Guille Fernández (footballer, born 1989) =

Spanish football manager

Personal information
- Full name: Guillermo Fernández González
- Date of birth: 31 January 1989 (age 37)
- Place of birth: Madrid, Spain
- Position: Midfielder

Youth career
- 2001–2008: Atlético Madrid

Senior career*
Years	Team	Apps	(Gls)
2008–2009	Collado Villalba		
2009–2011	Las Rozas		
2011–2015	Collado Villalba		
2015–2016	Guernsey	44	(0)
2016–2017	SF Benidorm CD	32	(2)
2017–2018	La Nucía B	21	(0)

Managerial career
- 2017–2018: La Nucía (youth)
- 2018–2019: Jamshedpur (assistant)
- 2019: SF Benidorm CD
- 2019–2021: La Nucía (assistant)
- 2021–2023: La Nucía B
- 2023: La Nucía (interim)
- 2023: La Nucía
- 2023–2025: Navalcarnero
- 2025–2026: Rayo Majadahonda
- * Club domestic league appearances and goals

Guillermo "Guille" Fernández González (born 31 January 1989) is a Spanish retired footballer who played as a midfielder, and was most recently the manager of CF Rayo Majadahonda.

== Playing career ==
Born in Madrid, Fernández moved to Benidorm, Alicante, Valencian Community at the age of two, and began playing with local sides before joining Atlético Madrid's youth setup at the age of 12. In 2008, after finishing his formation, he signed for Tercera División side CU Collado Villalba.

Fernández moved to Las Rozas CF in 2009, and helped the club to achieve promotion to division four before returning to his previous club in January 2011. On 24 July 2015, after achieving two promotions with Collado Villalba, he moved abroad and signed for Guernsey FC of the English Isthmian League.

Despite being told to "cope with the robustness of the English game" in his first matches, Fernández soon established himself as a starter for the Green Lions, but returned to his home country with SF Benidorm CD in May 2016. In 2017, he agreed to a deal with CF La Nucía, playing for their reserve team in the regional leagues before retiring in the following year.

== Managerial career ==
Fernández worked as manager of the Benjamín B squad of La Nucía during his playing days, and became César Ferrando's assistant at Indian side Jamshedpur FC in July 2018. He followed Ferrando back to La Nucía in 2019, again as his assistant, before taking over their B-team in April 2021.

On 25 January 2023, Fernández was named interim manager of the Nucieros in Primera Federación, after Ferrando was sacked. He was confirmed as manager of the side until the end of the season on 3 February, but was sacked on 13 April, with the club in the relegation zone.

On 20 November 2023, Fernández was announced as the Director of CF Benidorm's youth sides. On 28 December, however, he left the club to return to managerial duties, after being named at the helm of CDA Navalcarnero in Segunda Federación.

Fernández renewed his contract with Naval on 18 June 2024, but left the following 12 May, after narrowly missing out a play-off spot. On 13 June 2025, he was appointed manager of CF Rayo Majadahonda, recently relegated to division four.

On 22 May 2026, after leading Rayo back to the third division at first attempt, Fernández agreed to a one-year extension, but was sacked on 15 November 2026, with just two wins in twelve matches.

== Managerial statistics ==
As of 14 November 2026

Managerial record by team and tenure
Team	Nat	From	To	Record								Ref
Team	Nat	From	To	G	W	D	L	GF	GA	GD	Win %	Ref
SF Benidorm CD	(Spain)	8 April 2019	30 June 2019	5	2	2	1	6	7	−1	40.00	
La Nucía B	(Spain)	26 April 2021	25 January 2023	60	34	14	12	115	56	+59	56.67	
La Nucía	(Spain)	25 January 2023	13 April 2023	11	2	6	3	12	13	−1	18.18	
Navalcarnero	(Spain)	28 December 2023	12 May 2025	52	23	16	13	62	53	+9	44.23	
Rayo Majadahonda	(Spain)	13 June 2025	15 November 2026	48	23	11	14	62	43	+19	47.92	
Total				176	84	49	43	257	172	+85	47.73	—
