= La Salera =

Football stadium in Nájera, Spain

Coordinates: 42.4130°N 2.7415°W

La Salera is a football stadium located in Nájera, Spain.

== History ==
La Salera was opened in 1966. The stadium serves as the home stadium for Spanish sde Náxara. La Salera measures 100 meters long by 60 meters wide. The stadium has a capacity of around 1000.

La Salera is regarded as one of the most unique football stadiums in Spain. In 2020, the field of La Salera was vandalized.
