= Juan Carlos Beltrán =

Juan Carlos Beltrán may refer to:

- Juan Carlos Beltrán (footballer)
- Juan Carlos Beltrán (politician)
