= Carlos González (footballer, born 1997) =

Spanish footballer

Personal information
- Full name: Francisco Carlos González Cabrera
- Date of birth: 20 May 1997 (age 29)
- Place of birth: Santa Lucía de Tirajana, Spain
- Height: 1.78 m (5 ft 10 in)
- Position: Winger

Team information
- Current team: CSA Steaua București
- Number: 23

Youth career
- Vecindario
- Zaragoza
- –2015: Atlético Madrid
- 2015–2016: Las Palmas

Senior career*
Years	Team	Apps	(Gls)
2016–2019	Las Palmas B	77	(16)
2019	Las Palmas	1	(0)
2019–2021	Valencia B	38	(2)
2021–2022	Tamaraceite	31	(8)
2022–2023	Tarazona	27	(9)
2023–2024	Numancia	29	(7)
2024	Atlético Sanluqueño	13	(0)
2025	Numancia	10	(1)
2025–2026	Cacereño	17	(1)
2026	Europa	11	(2)
2026–	CSA Steaua București	8	(0)
- * Club domestic league appearances and goals as of 30 October 2026

Francisco Carlos González Cabrera (born 20 May 1997) is a Spanish professional footballer who plays as a winger for Liga II club CSA Steaua București.

== Club career ==
Born in Santa Lucía de Tirajana, Las Palmas, Canary Islands, González joined UD Las Palmas' youth setup in 2015, after representing Atlético Madrid, Real Zaragoza and UD Vecindario. He made his senior debut with the reserves on 10 April 2016, starting in a 0–0 Tercera División away draw against UD Villa de Santa Brígida.

González scored his first senior goal on 21 August 2016, in a 5–0 home routing of CD Buzanada. He scored a brace in a 7–0 thrashing of SD Tenisca the following 23 April, and finished the campaign with 13 goals as his side achieved promotion.

González made his first team debut on 2 June 2019, coming on as a second-half substitute for Cristian Cedrés in a 0–0 home draw against UD Almería in the Segunda División championship. On 2 July, he agreed to a two-year deal with Valencia CF, being assigned to the B-team in Segunda División B.

On 30 August 2024, González signed with Atlético Sanluqueño in Primera Federación.

On 7 February 2026, González joined Europa.

== Honours ==
Las Palmas B

- Tercera División: 2016–17
