= Racing Club Villalbés =

Spanish football club, based in Vilalba

Coordinates: 43.303056°N 7.691111°W

Racing Villalbés
- Full name: Racing Club Villalbés
- Founded: 1 November 1931; 95 years ago
- Stadium: A Magdalena
- Capacity: 2,000
- President: Juan José Vázquez Carreira
- Head coach: Juan Rodríguez García
- League: Tercera Federación – Group 1
- 2025–26: Tercera Federación – Group 1, 5th of 18
- Website: rcvillalbes.es
Home colours	Away colours

Racing Club Villalbés (Galician: Racing Club Vilalbés) is a Spanish football team based in Vilalba, in the autonomous community of Galicia. Founded in 1931, it currently plays in Tercera Federación – Group 1, holding home matches at Estadio Municipal A Magdalena, which has a capacity of 2,000 spectators.

== History ==
Founded on 1 November 1931 as Club Villalbés, the club only played regional football until ceasing activities in 1948. They only returned in 1953, playing for another eleven years before again going to inactivity.

In 1966, the club returned to an active status, now named Racing Club Villalbés. In 1992, they achieved their first promotion to Tercera División.

== Season to season ==
Season	Tier	Division	Place	Copa del Rey
1941–1947	—	Regional	—	
1947–48	4	Serie A	7th	
1948–1953	DNP			
1953–54	4	Serie A	8th	
1954–55	4	Serie A	6th	
1955–56	4	Serie A	8th	
1956–57	4	Serie A		
1957–58	4	Serie A	3rd	
1958–59	4	Serie A		
1959–60	5	1ª Reg.		
1960–61	5	1ª Reg.		
1961–62	5	1ª Reg.		
1962–63	5	1ª Reg.		
1963–64	5	1ª Reg.		
1964–65	DNP			
1965–66	DNP			
1966–67	5	1ª Reg.	2nd	
1967–68	5	1ª Reg.		
1968–69	5	1ª Reg.	1st	
1969–70	5	1ª Reg.	12th	

Season	Tier	Division	Place	Copa del Rey
1970–71	5	1ª Reg.	10th	
1971–72	5	1ª Reg.	4th	
1972–73	5	1ª Reg.	12th	
1973–74	6	2ª Reg.	4th	
1974–75	6	2ª Reg.	7th	
1975–76	6	2ª Reg.	13th	
1976–77	6	2ª Reg.	8th	
1977–78	7	2ª Reg.	6th	
1978–79	7	2ª Reg.	3rd	
1979–80	7	2ª Reg.	2nd	
1980–81	7	2ª Reg.	4th	
1981–82	6	1ª Reg.	4th	
1982–83	6	1ª Reg.	5th	
1983–84	6	1ª Reg.	1st	
1984–85	5	Reg. Pref.	10th	
1985–86	5	Reg. Pref.	7th	
1986–87	5	Reg. Pref.	4th	
1987–88	5	Reg. Pref.	7th	
1988–89	5	Reg. Pref.	4th	
1989–90	5	Reg. Pref.	12th	

Season	Tier	Division	Place	Copa del Rey
1990–91	5	Reg. Pref.	4th	
1991–92	5	Reg. Pref.	1st	
1992–93	4	3ª	9th	
1993–94	4	3ª	11th	
1994–95	4	3ª	18th	
1995–96	5	Reg. Pref.	13th	
1996–97	5	Reg. Pref.	4th	
1997–98	5	Reg. Pref.	6th	
1998–99	5	Reg. Pref.	1st	
1999–2000	4	3ª	9th	
2000–01	4	3ª	13th	
2001–02	4	3ª	13th	
2002–03	4	3ª	18th	
2003–04	5	Reg. Pref.	8th	
2004–05	5	Reg. Pref.	11th	
2005–06	5	Reg. Pref.	9th	
2006–07	5	Pref. Aut.	9th	
2007–08	5	Pref. Aut.	3rd	
2008–09	5	Pref. Aut.	1st	
2009–10	4	3ª	9th	

Season	Tier	Division	Place	Copa del Rey
2010–11	4	3ª	4th	
2011–12	4	3ª	5th	
2012–13	4	3ª	10th	
2013–14	4	3ª	13th	
2014–15	4	3ª	9th	
2015–16	4	3ª	5th	
2016–17	4	3ª	5th	
2017–18	4	3ª	3rd	
2018–19	4	3ª	11th	
2019–20	4	3ª	14th	
2020–21	4	3ª	4th / 3rd	
2021–22	5	3ª RFEF	7th	
2022–23	5	3ª Fed.	4th	
2023–24	4	2ª Fed.	14th	
2024–25	5	3ª Fed.	4th	
2025–26	5	3ª Fed.	5th	
2026–27	5	3ª Fed.		

- 1 season in Segunda Federación
- 19 seasons in Tercera División
- 5 seasons in Tercera Federación/Tercera División RFEF

== Current squad ==
As of 5 February 2024

Note: Flags indicate national team as defined under FIFA eligibility rules; some limited exceptions apply. Players may hold more than one non-FIFA nationality.

No.	Pos.	Nation	Player
1	GK	ESP	Alejandro Santomé
2	DF	ESP	Diego López
3	DF	ESP	David Buyo
4	DF	ESP	David Vérez
5	DF	ESP	Kiko González
6	MF	ESP	Javi Varela
7	MF	ESP	José Varela
8	MF	ESP	Alberto Lamas
9	FW	ESP	Izan Fernández
10	FW	ESP	Javi Rey
11	MF	ROU	Rareș Mezdrea
12	FW	SEN	Ibrahima Dieng

No.	Pos.	Nation	Player
13	GK	ESP	Arturo Ramírez
14	MF	ESP	Pablo Rey
15	DF	NGR	Nathaniel Nicholas
16	DF	ESP	Fito
17	DF	ESP	Carlos Torrado
18	DF	ESP	Luis Castro
19	FW	ESP	Adri Carrión
20	FW	ESP	Álex Pérez
21	FW	ESP	Isaac González
22	MF	ESP	Diego Uzal
—	FW	ESP	Miguel Duque
