= Ciudad Deportiva Getafe CF =

Training ground of Getafe CF

- Interactive map of Ciudad Deportiva Getafe CF
- Location: Getafe; Community of Madrid, Spain
- Coordinates: 40°19′28″N 03°42′38″W
- Owner: Community of Madrid
- Type: Football training ground

Construction
- Opened: 2005

Tenant
- Getafe CF (training) (2005)

Website
- Ciudad Deportiva

The Ciudad Deportiva Getafe CF is the training ground and academy base of the Spanish football club Getafe CF. It was opened in 2005.

Located in Getafe near the Coliseum Alfonso Pérez and covering an area of 70,000 m^{2}, it is used for youth and senior teams trainings.

== Facilities ==
- Ciudad Deportiva Stadium with a capacity of 1,500 seats, is the home stadium of Getafe CF B, the reserve team of Getafe CF.
- 1 grass pitch.
- 3 artificial pitches.
- 2 mini artificial pitches.
- Service centre with gymnasium.

== Links ==
- Stadium History Estadios de España (in English)
