= CD Manchego Ciudad Real =

Association football club in Spain

Manchego Ciudad Real
- Full name: Club Deportivo Manchego de Ciudad Real
- Founded: 24 August 2009; 17 years ago
- Ground: Rey Juan Carlos I Ciudad Real, Castile-La Mancha, Spain
- Capacity: 3,000
- President: José Juan Bedoya
- Head coach: Patricio Graff
- League: Tercera Federación – Group 18
- 2025–26: Tercera Federación – Group 18, 5th of 18
Home colours	Away colours	Third colours

Club Deportivo Manchego Ciudad Real is a Spanish football club based in Ciudad Real, Ciudad Real province, in the autonomous community of Castile-La Mancha. Founded in 2009 it plays in Tercera Federación – Group 18, holding home games at Estadio Juan Carlos I, which holds 3,000 spectators.

== History ==
CD Ciudad Real old logo

CD Manchego Ciudad Real was founded in 2009 with the name of Club Deportivo Ciudad Real. The club was renamed again as Manchego in July 2016.

== Season to season ==
Season	Tier	Division	Place	Copa del Rey
2009–10	7	2ª Aut.	1st	
2010–11	6	1ª Aut.	1st	
2011–12	5	Pref. Aut.	1st	
2012–13	4	3ª	17th	
2013–14	4	3ª	12th	
2014–15	4	3ª	15th	
2015–16	4	3ª	10th	
2016–17	4	3ª	7th	
2017–18	4	3ª	9th	
2018–19	4	3ª	6th	
2019–20	4	3ª	13th	
2020–21	4	3ª	9th	
2021–22	5	3ª RFEF	9th	
2022–23	5	3ª Fed.	1st	
2023–24	4	2ª Fed.	13th	
2024–25	5	3ª Fed.	11th	
2025–26	5	3ª Fed.	5th	
2026–27	5	3ª Fed.		

- 1 season in Segunda Federación
- 9 seasons in Tercera División
- 5 seasons in Tercera Federación/Tercera División RFEF
