= Brea de Aragón =

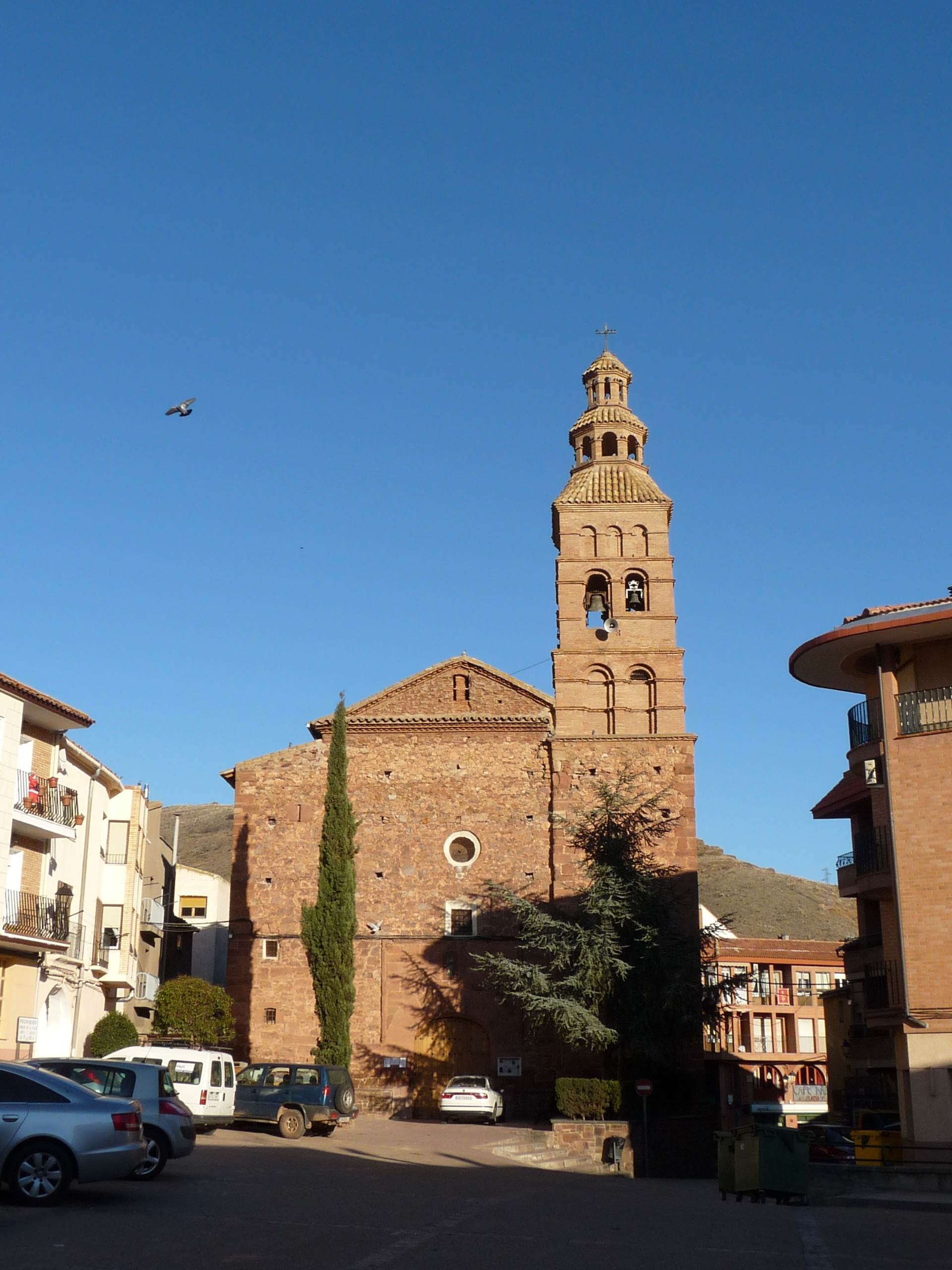

- Flag Coat of arms

- Location of Brea de Aragón within Aragon Location of Brea de Aragón within Spain
- Coordinates: 41°32′N 1°36′W
- Country: Spain
- Autonomous community: Aragon
- Province: Zaragoza
- Comarca: Aranda

Area
  - Total: 13 km^{2} (5.0 sq mi)

Population (2025-01-01)
  - Total: 1,517
  - Density: 120/km^{2} (300/sq mi)
- (INE)
- Demonym(s): Breano, Breana
- Time zone: UTC+1 (CET)
  - Summer (DST): UTC+2 (CEST)

Brea de Aragón is a municipality located in the province of Zaragoza, Aragon, Spain. According to the 2004 census (INE), the municipality has a population of 2,013 inhabitants.

== See also ==
- List of municipalities in Zaragoza
