= UD San Fernando =

Spanish football club

San Fernando
- Full name: Unión Deportiva San Fernando
- Founded: 15 April 1992; 34 years ago
- Ground: Ciudad Deportiva, Maspalomas, Canary Islands, Spain
- Capacity: 1,000
- President: (Spain) Serafín Herrera
- Head coach: (Spain) Tino Deniz
- League: Tercera Federación – Group 12
- 2025–26: Tercera Federación – Group 12, 2nd of 18
Home colours	Away colours

Unión Deportiva San Fernando is a Spanish football team based in Maspalomas, in the autonomous community of Canary Islands. Founded in 1992, it plays in , holding home matches at Ciudad Deportiva de Maspalomas, with a capacity of 1,000 seats.

== History ==
The founding act of the club was signed on 15 April 1992 at 7:00 p.m. at the Shopping Center Botánico in the San Fernando district of Maspalomas.

== Season to season ==
Season	Tier	Division	Place	Copa del Rey
1995–96	7	2ª Reg.	13th	
1996–97	7	2ª Reg.	5th	
1997–98	7	2ª Reg.	14th	
1998–2010	DNP			
2010–11	7	2ª Reg.	8th	
2011–12	7	2ª Reg.	3rd	
2012–13	6	1ª Reg.	1st	
2013–14	5	Int. Pref.	8th	
2014–15	5	Int. Pref.	1st	
2015–16	4	3ª	5th	
2016–17	4	3ª	2nd	
2017–18	4	3ª	3rd	First round
2018–19	4	3ª	8th	
2019–20	4	3ª	3rd	
2020–21	4	3ª	1st / 3rd	
2021–22	4	2ª RFEF	16th	
2022–23	5	3ª Fed.	3rd	
2023–24	4	2ª Fed.	15th	
2024–25	5	3ª Fed.	2nd	
2025–26	5	3ª Fed.	2nd	First round

Season	Tier	Division	Place	Copa del Rey
2026–27	5	3ª Fed.		

- 2 seasons in Segunda Federación/Segunda División RFEF
- 6 seasons in Tercera División
- 4 seasons in Tercera Federación
