= Náxara CD =

Association football club in Spain

Náxara
- Full name: Náxara Club Deportivo
- Nickname: NAX
- Founded: 19 March 1933; 93 years ago
- Ground: La Salera, Nájera, La Rioja, Spain
- Capacity: 1,500
- Chairman: (Spain) Marcos Martínez Hernáes
- Manager: (Spain) Rubén Sáez "Chiri"
- League: Segunda Federación – Group 2
- 2025–26: Segunda Federación – Group 2, 12th of 18
Home colours	Away colours

Náxara Club Deportivo is a Spanish football team based in Nájera in the autonomous community of La Rioja. Founded on 19 March 1933, it plays in Segunda Federación – Group 2.

== History ==
Náxara CD originated from enthusiasm of the students of the Santa María La Real school between the 1920s and 30s. The club finished 3rd in the 2018–19 season in the Tercera División, Group 16.

== Current squad ==
As of 15 February 2026

Note: Flags indicate national team as defined under FIFA eligibility rules; some limited exceptions apply. Players may hold more than one non-FIFA nationality.

No.	Pos.	Nation	Player
1	GK	ESP	Toño Ramírez
2	DF	ESP	Izán Flaño
3	DF	ESP	Miguel Rodríguez
4	DF	ESP	Eloy Blanco
5	DF	ESP	Juan García
6	DF	ESP	Iñigo Ochoa
7	FW	ESP	Iván Villoslada
8	MF	ESP	Samuel Lallana
9	FW	ESP	Javier Orodea
10	FW	ESP	Pepe Blanco
11	FW	ESP	Jorge Campos
12	MF	ESP	Marcos Ceña

No.	Pos.	Nation	Player
13	GK	ESP	David Lleyda
14	DF	ESP	Víctor Martínez
15	FW	ESP	Iván Rojo
16	FW	ESP	Hugo Martínez
17	FW	ESP	Markel Gil
18	MF	ESP	Álvaro García
19	MF	ESP	Alex Merino
20	MF	ESP	Iker Landín
21	DF	ESP	Javier Caño
22	MF	ESP	Álvaro Maiso
23	FW	ESP	Moustapha Zarouali

== Season to season ==
Season	Tier	Division	Place	Copa del Rey
1958–59	5	2ª Reg.	4th	
1959–1965	DNP			
1965–66	5	2ª Reg.	5th	
1966–67	5	2ª Reg.	2nd	
1967–68	4	1ª Reg.	4th	
1968–69	4	1ª Reg.	8th	
1969–70	4	1ª Reg.	13th	
1970–71	4	1ª Reg.	10th	
1971–72	4	1ª Reg.	15th	
1972–73	4	1ª Reg.	17th	
1973–74	5	2ª Reg.	3rd	
1974–75	5	1ª Reg.	4th	
1975–76	5	1ª Reg.	3rd	
1976–77	5	1ª Reg.	1st	
1977–78	5	Reg. Pref.	14th	
1978–79	5	Reg. Pref.	19th	
1979–80	5	Reg. Pref.	16th	
1980–81	5	Reg. Pref.	13th	
1981–82	5	Reg. Pref.	17th	
1982–83	6	1ª Reg.	3rd	

Season	Tier	Division	Place	Copa del Rey
1983–84	6	1ª Reg.	5th	
1984–85	6	1ª Reg.	3rd	
1985–86	6	1ª Reg.	1st	
1986–87	5	Reg. Pref.	8th	
1987–88	5	Reg. Pref.	5th	
1988–89	5	Reg. Pref.	9th	
1989–90	5	Reg. Pref.	6th	
1990–91	5	Reg. Pref.	5th	
1991–92	5	Reg. Pref.	5th	
1992–93	5	Reg. Pref.	2nd	
1993–94	5	Reg. Pref.	5th	
1994–95	5	Reg. Pref.	8th	
1995–96	5	Reg. Pref.	9th	
1996–97	5	Reg. Pref.	6th	
1997–98	5	Reg. Pref.	3rd	
1998–99	5	Reg. Pref.	6th	
1999–2000	5	Reg. Pref.	4th	
2000–01	5	Reg. Pref.	2nd	
2001–02	5	Reg. Pref.	9th	
2002–03	5	Reg. Pref.	5th	

Season	Tier	Division	Place	Copa del Rey
2003–04	5	Reg. Pref.	7th	
2004–05	4	3ª	13th	
2005–06	4	3ª	10th	
2006–07	4	3ª	7th	
2007–08	4	3ª	7th	
2008–09	4	3ª	6th	
2009–10	4	3ª	6th	
2010–11	4	3ª	1st	
2011–12	4	3ª	5th	First round
2012–13	4	3ª	6th	
2013–14	4	3ª	4th	
2014–15	4	3ª	5th	
2015–16	4	3ª	4th	
2016–17	4	3ª	2nd	
2017–18	4	3ª	3rd	
2018–19	4	3ª	3rd	
2019–20	4	3ª	7th	
2020–21	4	3ª	3rd / 2nd	
2021–22	4	2ª RFEF	16th	
2022–23	5	3ª Fed.	1st	

Season	Tier	Division	Place	Copa del Rey
2023–24	4	2ª Fed.	16th	First round
2024–25	5	3ª Fed.	1st	
2025–26	4	2ª Fed.	12th	First round
2026–27	4	2ª Fed.		

- 4 seasons in Segunda Federación/Segunda División RFEF
- 17 seasons in Tercera División
- 2 seasons in Tercera Federación
