= Tercera Federación =

Spanish association football league

- Organising body: RFEF
- Founded: 6 May 2020; 6 years ago
- First season: 2021–22
- Country: Spain
- Confederation: UEFA
- Number of clubs: 320 (2021–22); 288 (2022–23); 324 (2023–24, 2025–26, 2026–27); 325 (2024–25)
- Level on pyramid: 5
- Promotion to: Segunda Federación
- Relegation to: Divisiones Regionales
- Domestic cup(s): Copa del Rey; Copa Federación
- Broadcaster(s): tvG2, laOtra, PTV Córdoba
- Current: 2026–27 Tercera Federación

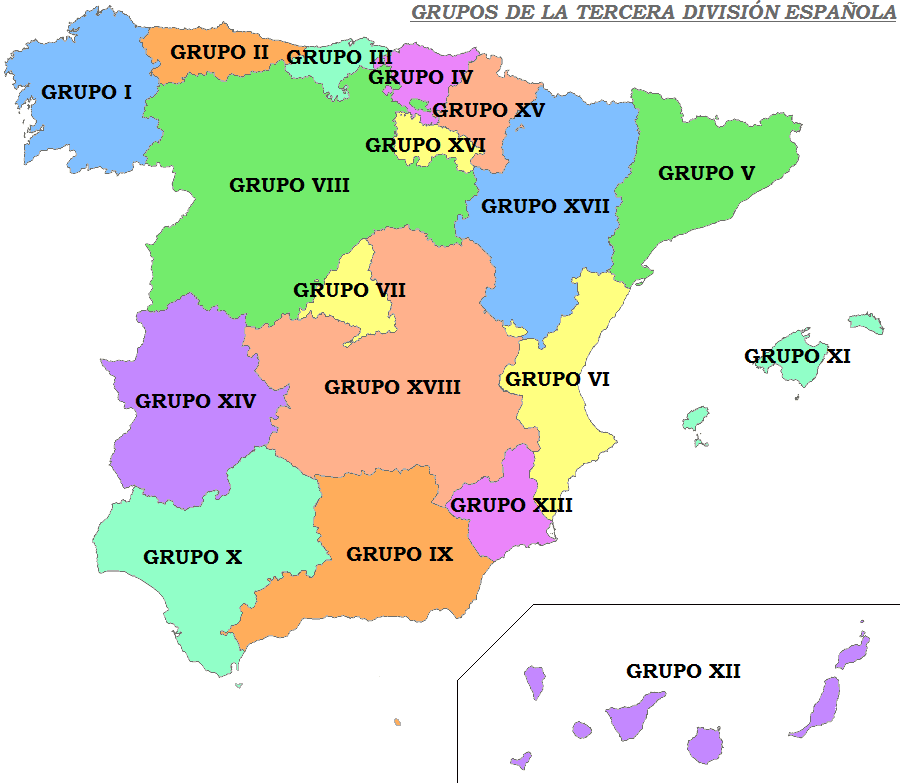
Groups of Tercera Federación

Tercera Federación, previously known as Tercera RFEF, is the fifth tier of the Spanish football league system. It is below the La Liga, Segunda División, and its fellow semi-professional divisions Primera Federación and Segunda Federación. It was founded in 1929 as the third tier, and dropped down to the fourth and fifth tiers in 1977 and 2021, respectively.

== History ==
On 6 May 2020, the RFEF announced the creation of a new, two-group, 40-team third division called Primera División RFEF, which caused the former third and fourth divisions, Segunda División B and Tercera División, respectively, to drop down a level and change into Segunda División RFEF and Tercera División RFEF; the changes were made effective for the 2021–22 campaign.

In July 2022, the division was renamed Tercera Federación.

== Current format ==
The Tercera Federación features 18 regional groups (like the former fourth tier Tercera División), corresponding to the autonomous communities of Spain (due to its size, Andalusia is divided into two groups, East and West; Ceuta is allocated to West Andalusia, while Melilla is allocated to the East), where each group is administered by a regional football federation. At the end of the season the first four teams in each group qualify for promotion play-offs to decide which teams are promoted to Segunda Federación. At least the three teams finishing bottom of each group may be relegated to the Divisiones Regionales de Fútbol. However the number of teams relegated can vary. The eighteen group champions also qualify for the following season's Copa del Rey. However reserve teams are ineligible. Along with teams from Segunda Federación, the remaining teams from the division compete in the Copa Federación.

Group	Region	Relegation
1	Galicia	Preferente Futgal
2	Asturias	Primera Asturfútbol
3	Cantabria	Regional Preferente
4	Basque Country	División de Honor
5	Catalonia and Andorra	Lliga Elit
6	Valencian Community	Lliga Comunitat
7	Community of Madrid	Primera División Autonómica
8	Castile and León	Primera Regional
9	Eastern Andalusia	División de Honor – Group 2
9	Melilla	Primera Autonómica
10	Western Andalusia	División de Honor – Group 1
10	Ceuta	Regional Preferente
11	Balearic Islands	División de Honor
12	Canary Islands	Interinsular Preferente
13	Region of Murcia	Preferente Autonómica
14	Extremadura	Primera División Extremeña
15	Navarre	Primera Autonómica
16	La Rioja	Regional Preferente
17	Aragon	Regional Preferente
18	Castile-La Mancha	Primera Autonómica Preferente

== Teams ==
The member clubs of the Tercera Federación for the 2026–27 season are listed below.

Group	Teams
Group 1	
Group 2	
Group 3	
Group 4	
Group 5	
Group 6	
Group 7	
Group 8	
Group 9	
Group 10	
Group 11	
Group 12	
Group 13	
Group 14	
Group 15	
Group 16	
Group 17	
Group 18	

== Winners and promotions ==
All group champions are promoted to Segunda Federación. Administrative promotions not included in this table.

Season	I X	II XI	III XII	IV XIII	V XIV	VI XV	VII XVI	VIII XVII	IX XVIII
2021–22	Polvorín	Oviedo Vetusta	Gimnástica Torrelavega	Alavés B	Manresa	Valencia Mestalla	Atlético Madrid B	Guijuelo	Juventud Torremolinos
2021–22	Recreativo	Mallorca B	Atlético Paso	Yeclano	Diocesano	Atlético Cirbonero	Arnedo	Deportivo Aragón	Guadalajara
2021–22	Other promoted teams: Ourense CF (I), Beasain (IV), Olot (V), Atlético Saguntino (VI), Alcorcón B (VII), Utrera (X), Cartagena B (XIII), Alfaro (XVI), Utebo (XVII)								
2022–23	Deportivo Fabril	Covadonga	Cayón	Barakaldo	Europa	Orihuela	Ursaria	Arandina	Marbella
2022–23	Atlético Antoniano	Andratx	Mensajero	Águilas	Llerenense	Egüés	Náxara	Robres	Manchego
2022–23	Other promoted teams: Racing Villalbés (I), Sant Andreu (V), Torrent (VI), Getafe B (VII), El Palo (IX), Penya Independent (XI), San Fernando (XII), La Unión Atlético (XIII), Illescas (XVIII)								
2023–24	Bergantiños	Llanera	Escobedo	Vitoria	Olot	Elche Ilicitano	Real Madrid C	Real Ávila	Juventud Torremolinos
2023–24	Xerez	Ibiza Islas Pitiusas	Tenerife B	Minera	Don Benito	Subiza	UD Logroñés B	Ejea	Conquense
2023–24	Other promoted teams: Laredo (III), Moscardó (VII), Salamanca (VIII), Almería B (IX), Xerez Deportivo (X), Mallorca B (XI), Unión Sur Yaiza (XII), Coria (XIV), Anguiano (XVI)								
2024–25	UD Ourense	Oviedo Vetusta	Sámano	Basconia	Reus FCR	Castellón B	Alcalá	Atlético Astorga	Atlético Malagueño
2024–25	Puente Genil	Poblense	Las Palmas Atlético	Lorca Deportiva	Extremadura	Mutilvera	Náxara	Ebro	Quintanar del Rey
2024–25	Other promoted teams: Sarriana (I), Lealtad (II), Beasain (IV), Girona B (V), Rayo Vallecano B (VII), Burgos Promesas (VIII), Jaén (IX), Porreres (XI), Socuéllamos (XVIII), Atlètic Lleida (A)								
2025–26	Arosa	Llanera	Gimnástica Torrelavega	Portugalete	Manresa	Castellonense	Atlético Madrid C	Atlético Tordesillas	Mijas-Las Lagunas
2025–26	Ciudad de Lucena	Mallorca B	Atlético Paso	Cieza	Don Benito	Peña Sport	UD Logroñés B	Calamocha	Calvo Sotelo
2025–26	Other promoted teams: Compostela (I), La Nucía (VI), Atlético Central (X), Peña Deportiva (XI), Tamaraceite (XII), Murcia Imperial (XIII), Badajoz (XIV), Arnedo (XVI), Atlético Albacete (XVIII)								
