= 2024 Tercera Federación play-offs =

Spanish football league play-offs

The 2024 Tercera Federación play-offs to Segunda Federación from Tercera Federación (promotion play-offs) are the final play-offs for the promotion from 2023–24 Tercera Federación to 2024–25 Segunda Federación.

== Format ==
Group champions will be promoted directly to the Segunda Federación. Due to the remodeling of the RFEF leagues, as of 2021–22 season the promotion play-off is divided into two stages: regional and national. Four teams from each group participate in the regional stage, which were classified between places second and fifth of the regular season. Since 2022–23 season the regional stage is a series of two matches. The second classified will face the fifth classified; and the third will do the same with the fourth. The winners of the two series will play a series to determine the team that will qualify for the national stage.

In the regional phase, if the aggregated score ends in a draw, extra time will be played, if the same result is maintained at the end of extra time, the best seeded team will win.

The national stage will be played by 18 teams, which won their respective regional play-offs. Since 2022–23 season nine different series will be played to determine the winners of the promotion to Segunda Federación.

As 2022–23 season, the RFEF recovered the two-legged knockout system, due to the complaints filed against the single knockout system at a neutral venue that had been implemented after COVID-19 and the subsequent reform of the football leagues organized by the RFEF.

== Qualified teams ==
Group 1		Group 2		Group 3		Group 4		Group 5		Group 6	
2nd	Gran Peña	2nd	Sporting Atlético	2nd	**Laredo**	2nd	Basconia	2nd	L'Hospitalet	2nd	Jove Español
3rd	Arosa	3rd	Lealtad	3rd	SD Torina	3rd	Beasain	3rd	Vilassar de Mar	3rd	Ontinyent 1931
4th	UD Ourense	4th	Ceares	4th	Atlético Albericia	4th	Deusto	4th	Badalona	4th	Atzeneta
5th	Sarriana	5th	L'Entregu	5th	Vimenor	5th	Portugalete	5th	Prat	5th	Utiel
Group 7		Group 8		Group 9		Group 10		Group 11		Group 12	
2nd	Móstoles URJC	2nd	**Salamanca**	2nd	Jaén	2nd	Ciudad de Lucena	2nd	**Mallorca B**	2nd	Lanzarote
3rd	Leganés B	3rd	Atlético Tordesillas	3rd	Atlético Malagueño	3rd	**Xerez Deportivo**	3rd	Poblense	3rd	**Unión Sur Yaiza**
4th	Las Rozas	4th	Júpiter Leonés	4th	**Almería B**	4th	Pozoblanco	4th	Platges de Calvià	4th	Las Palmas Atlético
5th	**Moscardó**	5th	Atlético Astorga	5th	Torre del Mar	5th	Ceuta B	5th	Manacor	5th	Panadería Pulido
Group 13		Group 14		Group 15		Group 16		Group 17		Group 18	
2nd	Murcia Imperial	2nd	**Coria**	2nd	Cortes	2nd	**Alfaro** (Note: Alfaro promoted to 2024–25 Segunda Federación, because UD Logroñés failed to promote to 2024–25 Primera Federación, making its reserve team ineligible for promotion despite finishing in the group first place.)	2nd	Cuarte	2nd	Cazalegas
3rd	Cieza	3rd	Azuaga	3rd	Ardoi	4th	**Anguiano**	3rd	Ebro	3rd	Toledo
4th	Caravaca	4th	Villafranca	4th	Peña Sport	5th	Varea	4th	Épila	4th	Socuéllamos
6th	Lorca Deportiva (Note: Lorca Deportiva qualified for the play-off, because UCAM Murcia B is ineligible for promotion, as their parent club, UCAM Murcia, will participate in the 2024–25 Segunda Federación.)	5th	Moralo	5th	Huarte	6th	Oyonesa (Note: Oyonesa qualified for the play-off, because Calahorra B is ineligible for promotion, as their parent club, Calahorra, will participate in the 2024–25 Segunda Federación.)	5th	Caspe	5th	Quintanar del Rey

- Teams in **bold** promoted to the Segunda Federación
- Teams in italics progressed to the national stage

== Regional stage ==
=== Group 1 – Galicia ===
Semi–finals
2	Gran Peña	0	4	4
5	Sarriana	0	1	1
3	Arosa	2	1	3
4	UD Ourense	2	2	4 (a.e.t.)

Final
2	Gran Peña	3	2	5
4	UD Ourense	3	1	4

- Group champions: Bergantiños

=== Group 2 – Asturias ===
Semi–finals
2	Sporting Atlético	0	2	2
5	L'Entregu	0	3	3
3	Lealtad	1	3	4
4	Ceares	0	1	1

Final
5	L’Entregu	3	0	3
3	Lealtad	0	2	2

- Group champions: Llanera

=== Group 3 – Cantabria ===
Semi–finals
2	Laredo	1	1	2
5	Vimenor	0	1	1
3	Torina	2	1	3
4	Atlético Albericia	1	1	2

Final
2	Laredo	0	2	2
3	Torina	1	0	1

- Group champions: Escobedo

=== Group 4 – Basque Country ===
Semi–finals
2	Basconia	1	0	1
5	Portugalete	2	3	5
3	Beasain	0	2	2
4	Deusto	1	0	1

Final
5	Portugalete	0	2	2
3	Beasain	0	1	1

- Group champions: Vitoria

=== Group 5 – Catalonia ===
Semi–finals
2	L'Hospitalet	1	2	3 (a.e.t.)
5	Prat	0	1	1
3	Vilassar de Mar	0	2	2
4	Badalona	3	1	4

Final
2	L'Hospitalet	1	1	2
4	Badalona	1	0	1

- Group champions: Olot

=== Group 6 – Valencian Community ===
Semi–finals
2	Jove Español	0	1	1
5	Utiel	0	0	0
3	Ontinyent 1931	1	0	1
4	Atzeneta	1	1	2

Final
2	Jove Español	1	1	2
4	Atzeneta	1	0	1

- Group champions: Elche Ilicitano

=== Group 7 – Community of Madrid ===
Semi–finals
2	Móstoles URJC	0	1	1
5	Moscardó	0	3	3 (a.e.t.)
3	Leganés B	1	4	5 (a.e.t.)
4	Las Rozas	1	1	2

Final
5	Moscardó	1	1	2
3	Leganés B	1	0	1

- Group champions: Real Madrid C

=== Group 8 – Castile and León ===
Semi–finals
2	Salamanca	1	0	1
5	Atlético Astorga	0	0	0
3	Atlético Tordesillas	4	1	5
4	Júpiter Leonés	0	2	2

Final
2	Salamanca	2	2	4
3	Atlético Tordesillas	0	0	0

- Group champions: Ávila

=== Group 9 – Eastern Andalusia ===
Semi–finals
2	Jaén	1	0	1 (seed)
5	Torre del Mar	1	0	1
3	Atlético Malagueño	1	1	2
4	Almería B	3	2	5

Final
2	Jaén	2	1	3
4	Almería B	2	2	4

- Group champions: Juventud Torremolinos

=== Group 10 – Western Andalusia ===
Semi–finals
2	Ciudad de Lucena	1	0	1
5	Ceuta B	1	4	5
3	Xerez Deportivo	1	1	2
4	Pozoblanco	0	1	1

Final
5	Ceuta B	0	2	2
3	Xerez Deportivo	0	3	3

- Group champions: Xerez

=== Group 11 – Balearic Islands ===
Semi–finals
2	Mallorca B	0	5	5 (a.e.t.)
5	Manacor	1	1	2
3	Poblense	0	2	2 (a.e.t.)
4	Platges de Calvià	0	1	1

Final
2	Mallorca B	0	1	1 (seed)
3	Poblense	1	0	1

- Group champions: Ibiza Islas Pitiusas

=== Group 12 – Canary Islands ===
Semi–finals
2	Lanzarote	1	0	1
5	Panadería Pulido	1	1	2 (a.e.t.)
3	Unión Sur Yaiza	1	1	2 (a.e.t.)
4	Las Palmas Atlético	0	1	1

Final
5	Panadería Pulido	1	0	1
3	Unión Sur Yaiza	1	3	4

- Group champions: Tenerife B

=== Group 13 – Region of Murcia ===
Semi–finals
2	Murcia Imperial	1	3	4 (a.e.t.)
6	Lorca Deportiva	0	2	2
3	Cieza	0	2	2 (seed)
5	Caravaca	0	2	2

Final
2	Murcia Imperial	1	1	2 (seed)
3	Cieza	1	1	2

- Group champions: Minera

=== Group 14 – Extremadura ===
Semi–finals
2	Coria	2	4	6
5	Moralo	0	1	1
3	Azuaga	1	4	5
4	Villafranca	1	0	1

Final
2	Coria	0	1	1 (seed)
3	Azuaga	0	1	1

- Group champions: Don Benito

=== Group 15 – Navarre ===
Semi–finals
2	Cortes	0	1	1
5	Huarte	1	1	2 (a.e.t.)
3	Ardoi	1	1	2
4	Peña Sport	0	1	1

Final
5	Huarte	1	3	4
3	Ardoi	1	4	5

- Group champions: Subiza

=== Group 16 – La Rioja ===
Semi–finals
2	Alfaro	1	2	3
6	Oyonesa	4	2	6
4	Anguiano	1	2	3 (a.e.t.)
5	Varea	1	1	2

Final
6	Oyonesa	0	1	1
4	Anguiano	0	2	2

- Group champions: UD Logroñés B, however, Alfaro occupied the direct promotion slot due to UD Logroñés' participation in 2024–25 Segunda Federación

=== Group 17 – Aragon ===
Semi–finals
2	Cuarte	1	1	2
5	Caspe	1	0	0
3	Ebro	2	2	4
4	Épila	0	0	0

Final
2	Cuarte	1	1	2 (seed)
3	Ebro	1	1	1

- Group champions: Ejea

=== Group 18 – Castilla–La Mancha ===
Semi–finals
2	Cazalegas	0	1	1
5	Quintanar del Rey	2	2	4
3	Toledo	2	2	4
4	Socuéllamos	1	0	1

Final
5	Quintanar del Rey	1	1	2
3	Toledo	0	2	2 (seed)

- Group champions: Conquense

== National stage ==
=== Qualified teams ===
Group	Position	Team
1	2nd	Gran Peña
3	2nd	**Laredo**
5	2nd	L'Hospitalet
6	2nd	Jove Español
8	2nd	**Salamanca**
11	2nd	**Mallorca B**
13	2nd	Murcia Imperial
14	2nd	**Coria**
17	2nd	Cuarte

Group	Position	Team
10	3rd	**Xerez Deportivo**
12	3rd	**Unión Sur Yaiza**
15	3rd	Ardoi
18	3rd	Toledo

Group	Position	Team
9	4th	**Almería B**
16	4th	**Anguiano**

Group	Position	Team
2	5th	L'Entregu
4	5th	Portugalete
7	5th	**Moscardó**

Bold indicates teams that were promoted

=== Matches ===
Team 1	Agg.	Team 2	1st leg	2nd leg
**Coria**	5–2	Murcia Imperial	1–1	4–1
**Mallorca B**	3–1	L'Entregu	2–1	1–0
**Anguiano**	4–1	Ardoi	3–0	1–1
Portugalete	2–2 (1–3 p)	**Unión Sur Yaiza**	1–1	1–1 (a.e.t.)
Jove Español	1–1 (4–5 p)	**Xerez Deportivo**	1–0	0–1 (a.e.t.)
**Moscardó**	4–2	L'Hospitalet	1–1	3–1
Toledo	2–5	**Almería B**	1–1	1–4
Cuarte	1–1 (1–3 p)	**Laredo**	1–1	0–0 (a.e.t.)
**Salamanca**	1–0	Gran Peña	1–0	0–0

First leg

16 June 2024	**Murcia Imperial**	**1–1**	**Coria**	Murcia
18.00 UTC+2	Ferrer 50'		Barra 20'	Stadium: Estadio Enrique Roca

16 June 2024	**L'Entregu**	**1–2**	**Mallorca B**	L'Entregu
12.00 UTC+2	Oscar 50'		Mascaró 61'; Miguelito 64'	Stadium: Estadio Nuevo Nalón

15 June 2024	**Ardoi**	**0–3**	**Anguiano**	Zizur Mayor/Zizur Nagusia
20.00 UTC+2			Barcina 55'; Urrecho 70'; Padín 89'	Stadium: Campo de Fútbol El Pinar

16 June 2024	**Unión Sur Yaiza**	**1–1**	**Portugalete**	Yaiza
12.30 UTC+2	Matías 9'		Villar 64'	Stadium: Estadio Municipal de Yaiza

16 June 2024	**Xerez Deportivo**	**0–1**	**Jove Español**	Jerez de la Frontera
19.00 UTC+2			Pérez 13'	Stadium: Estadio Municipal de Chapín

16 June 2024	**L'Hospitalet**	**1–1**	**Moscardó**	L'Hospitalet de Llobregat
12.30 UTC+2	Montori 35'		Nader 18'	Stadium: Estadi Municipal de Futbol de L'Hospitalet

16 June 2024	**Almería B**	**1–1**	**Toledo**	Almería
12.00 UTC+2	Rachad 61'		Gavilán 2'	Stadium: Power Horse Stadium

16 June 2024	**Laredo**	**1–1**	**Cuarte**	Laredo
18.00 UTC+2	Carral 50'		Gassama 88' (pen.)	Stadium: Estadio San Lorenzo

16 June 2024	**Gran Peña**	**0–1**	**Salamanca**	Vigo
18.00 UTC+2			Fassani 61'	Stadium: Campo Municipal de Barreiro

Second leg

22 June 2024	**Coria**	**4–1** (**5–2** agg.)	**Murcia Imperial**	Coria
20.00 UTC+2	Yeboah 18' (o.g.); León 45'; Gómez 83' (pen.); Angelito 90+1'		Mariano 55'	Stadium: Estadio La Isla; Referee: Chavarrías Pérez

23 June 2024	**Mallorca B**	**1–0** (**3–1** agg.)	**L'Entregu**	Palma de Mallorca
12.00 UTC+2	Wade 40'	Report		Stadium: Estadi Son Bibiloni; Referee: Carrillo García

23 June 2024	**Anguiano**	**1–1** (**4–1** agg.)	**Ardoi**	Anguiano
17.30 UTC+2	Olarte 56'	Report	Lizarraga 64'	Stadium: Estadio de Isla; Referee: Sánchez Sancho

23 June 2024	**Portugalete**	**1-1** (a.e.t.) (**2–2** agg.) (**1–3** p)	**Unión Sur Yaiza**	Portugalete
12.00 UTC+2	Zorilla 52'	Report	Melián 90'	Stadium: Estadio La Florida; Referee: Parra Gorriz
	**Penalties**
	Ieltxu García (penalty scored); Del Cura (penalty missed); Iñigo (penalty missed); Ibon (penalty missed)		Trovento (penalty scored); Ubay (penalty missed); Pato (penalty missed); Melián (penalty scored); M. Bassele (penalty scored)

22 June 2024	**Jove Español**	**0–1** (a.e.t.) (**1–1** agg.) (**4–5** p)	**Xerez Deportivo**	Sant Vicent del Raspeig
19.00 UTC+2		Report	Ndour 88'	Stadium: Ciudad Deportiva San Vicente; Referee: González Umbert
	**Penalties**
	Lara (penalty missed); Axo (penalty scored); Samy (penalty scored); Javi Salero (penalty scored); Ekedi (penalty scored); José García (penalty missed)		González (penalty scored); Garrido (penalty missed); Rafa Parejo (penalty scored); Oca (penalty scored); Beto Plaza (penalty scored); Ramos Mingo (penalty scored)

23 June 2024	**Moscardó**	**3–1** (**4–2** agg.)	**L'Hospitalet**	Madrid
12.00 UTC+2	Sanchez 44'; Umpa 73', 90+2'	Report	Pozo 90+5'	Stadium: Estadio Román Valero; Referee: López Santos

23 June 2024	**Toledo**	**1–4** (**2–5** agg.)	**Almería B**	Toledo
19.00 UTC+2	Gavilán 6'	Report	Loren 57'; Rachad 88'; Romera 90'; Milovanović 90+3'	Stadium: Estadio Salto del Caballo; Referee: Gámez Illera

23 June 2024	**Cuarte**	**0–0** (a.e.t.) (**1–1** agg.) (**1–3** p)	**Laredo**	Cuarte de Huerva
18.00 UTC+2		Report		Stadium: Estadio Municipal de Cuarte; Referee: Bureu Méndez
	**Penalties**
	Chus Herrero (penalty missed); Rami (penalty missed); Cota (penalty scored); Gassama (penalty missed)		Txopi (penalty missed); Bruno Pascua (penalty scored); Júnior (penalty scored); Gomila (penalty scored)

23 June 2024	**Salamanca**	**0–0** (**1–0** agg.)	**Gran Peña**	Villares de la Reina
18.00 UTC+2		Report		Stadium: Estadio Helmántico; Referee: Sánchez Murcia

== Promoted teams ==
- The 18 teams that were promoted through regular season groups are included.
- The number of years after the last participation of the club in the fourth tier is referred to the previous appearance at that level. Depending on the time, it could have been Divisiones Regionales (until 1977), Tercera División (1977–2021) or Segunda Federación (2021–present).

Promoted to Segunda Federación
Alfaro (1 year later)	Almería B (5 years later)	Anguiano (First time ever)	Ávila (3 years later)	Bergantiños (1 year later)	Conquense (3 years later)	Coria (1 year later)	Don Benito (1 year later)	Ejea (2 years later)
Elche Ilicitano (3 years later)	Escobedo (3 years later)	Ibiza Islas Pitiusas (1 year later)	Juventud Torremolinos (1 year later)	Laredo (1 year later)	Llanera (2 years later)	Mallorca B (1 year later)	Minera (3 years later)	Moscardó (8 years later)
Olot (1 year later)	Real Madrid C (9 years later)	Salamanca (2 years later)	Subiza (First time ever)	Tenerife B (3 years later)	Unión Sur Yaiza (5 years later)	Vitoria (3 years later)	Xerez (3 years later)	Xerez Deportivo (1 year later)
