= Carlos Álvarez (footballer, born 1986) =

Spanish footballer

Personal information
- Full name: Carlos Álvarez Sánchez
- Date of birth: 24 April 1986 (age 40)
- Place of birth: Oviedo, Spain
- Height: 1.82 m (5 ft 11 1/2 in)
- Position: Striker

Youth career
- Avilés

Senior career*
Years	Team	Apps	(Gls)
2005–2006	Covadonga		
2006–2010	Sporting Gijón B	146	(60)
2007	Sporting Gijón	1	(0)
2010–2011	Puertollano	28	(5)
2011	Caudal	6	(1)
2011–2013	Gimnástica	52	(16)
2013	Cádiz	15	(3)
2013–2015	Leganés	48	(17)
2015–2016	Murcia	54	(15)
2016–2017	Fuenlabrada	10	(1)
2017	Racing Santander	20	(4)
2017–2018	Burgos	34	(3)
2018–2019	Jumilla	32	(8)
2019–2021	Racing Murcia	47	(20)
2021	Bullense	33	(10)
2022	El Palmar	4	(0)
2022–2023	Montecasillas	3	(0)
2024	Plus Ultra	4	(1)
- * Club domestic league appearances and goals

Carlos Álvarez Sánchez (born 24 April 1986) is a Spanish former footballer who played as a striker.
