= Ramonzuelo =

Spanish footballer and manager

Personal information
- Full name: Ramón García Martínez
- Date of birth: 6 November 1905
- Place of birth: Alicante, Spain
- Position: Midfielder

Youth career
- Círculo Bellas Artes Alicante
- Natación Alicante

Senior career*
Years	Team	Apps	(Gls)
1922–1926	Natación Alicante		
1926–1927	Elche		
1927–1928	Levante		
1928–1930	Europa	13	(3)
1930–1933	Hércules		

Managerial career
- 1946–1947: Alicante
- 1952–1953: Hércules (director of sports)
- 1953–1962: Hércules (youth)
- 1954–1956: Hércules (assistant)
- 1958: Hércules (caretaker)
- 1958–1959: Hércules (caretaker)
- Español San Vicente
- * Club domestic league appearances and goals

Ramón García Martínez also known as Ramonzuelo (born 6 November 1905) was a Spanish footballer and football manager.
