= CD Lerinés =

Association football club in Spain

Lerinés
- Full name: Club Deportivo Lerinés
- Founded: September 1948; 77 years ago
- Ground: La Romaleta, Villafranca, Navarre, Spain
- Capacity: 3,000
- President: Alfonso Yerro Ochoa
- Manager: Gorka Araiz
- League: Primera Autonómica
- 2024–25: Primera Autonómica, 11th of 18
| Home colours | Away colours |

Club Deportivo Lerinés is a Spanish football team based in Lerín, in the autonomous community of Navarre. Founded in 1922, they play in Primera Autonómica, holding home games at Polideportivo Municipal La Romaleta, with a capacity of 3,000 people.

== Honours ==
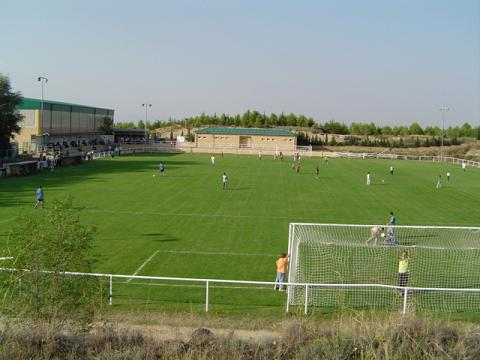
Polideportivo Municipal La Romaleta

Founded in September 1948, Lerinés the club ceased activities in 1952 and only returned in 1967. The club subsequently played in regional leagues until 2023, when they achieved a first-ever promotion to Tercera Federación.

== Season to season ==
| Season | Tier | Division | Place | Copa del Rey |
|---|---|---|---|---|
| 1949–50 | 5 | 2ª Reg. | 1st | |
| 1950–51 | 5 | 2ª Reg. | 2nd | |
| 1951–1967 | DNP | | | |
| 1977–78 | 7 | 2ª Reg. | 5th | |
| 1978–79 | 7 | 2ª Reg. | 7th | |
| 1979–80 | 7 | 2ª Reg. | 2nd | |
| 1980–81 | 6 | 1ª Reg. | 12th | |
| 1981–82 | 6 | 1ª Reg. | 11th | |
| 1982–83 | 6 | 1ª Reg. | 15th | |
| 1983–84 | 6 | 1ª Reg. | 15th | |
| 1984–85 | 6 | 1ª Reg. | 12th | |
| 1985–86 | 6 | 1ª Reg. | 20th | |
| 1986–87 | 6 | 1ª Reg. | (R) | |
| 1987–1992 | DNP | | | |
| 1992–93 | 6 | 1ª Reg. | 5th | |
| 1993–94 | 6 | 1ª Reg. | 9th | |
| 1994–95 | 6 | 1ª Reg. | 1st | |
| 1995–96 | 6 | 1ª Reg. | 7th | |
| 1996–97 | 6 | 1ª Reg. | 1st | |
| 1997–98 | 6 | 1ª Reg. | 4th | |

| Season | Tier | Division | Place | Copa del Rey |
|---|---|---|---|---|
| 1998–99 | 6 | 1ª Reg. | 6th | |
| 1999–2000 | 6 | 1ª Reg. | 3rd | |
| 2000–01 | 6 | 1ª Reg. | 4th | |
| 2001–02 | 6 | 1ª Reg. | 1st | |
| 2002–03 | 5 | Reg. Pref. | 17th | |
| 2003–04 | 6 | 1ª Reg. | 4th | |
| 2004–05 | 6 | 1ª Reg. | 1st | |
| 2005–06 | 6 | 1ª Reg. | 3rd | |
| 2006–07 | 6 | 1ª Reg. | 3rd | |
| 2007–08 | 6 | 1ª Reg. | 2nd | |
| 2008–09 | 6 | 1ª Reg. | 5th | |
| 2009–10 | 6 | 1ª Reg. | 1st | |
| 2010–11 | 5 | Reg. Pref. | 11th | |
| 2011–12 | 5 | Reg. Pref. | 12th | |
| 2012–13 | 5 | Reg. Pref. | 16th | |
| 2013–14 | 6 | 1ª Reg. | 3rd | |
| 2014–15 | 5 | Reg. Pref. | 15th | |
| 2015–16 | 6 | Reg. Pref. | 12th | |
| 2016–17 | 6 | Reg. Pref. | 8th | |
| 2017–18 | 6 | Reg. Pref. | 5th | |

| Season | Tier | Division | Place | Copa del Rey |
|---|---|---|---|---|
| 2018–19 | 6 | Reg. Pref. | 9th | |
| 2019–20 | 6 | Reg. Pref. | 6th | |
| 2020–21 | 6 | Reg. Pref. | 1st | |
| 2021–22 | 6 | 1ª Aut. | 2nd | |
| 2022–23 | 6 | 1ª Aut. | 2nd | |
| 2023–24 | 5 | 3ª Fed. | 17th | |
| 2024–25 | 6 | 1ª Aut. | 11th | |
| 2025–26 | 6 | 1ª Aut. | | |

- 1 season in Tercera Federación
