= 2023–24 Tercera Federación =

Tercera Federación
- Season: 2023–24
- Dates: 9 September 2023 – 23 June 2024

The 2023–24 Tercera Federación season is the third for Tercera Federación, the national fifth level in the Spanish football league system. It consists of 18 groups with 18 teams each.

== Competition format ==
- The group champions are promoted to 2024–25 Segunda Federación.
- The best non-reserve team of each group qualifies for 2024–25 Copa del Rey.
- Relegations to the regional leagues may depend on which clubs are relegated in the 2023–24 Segunda Federación, as well as the number of the promoted teams for the ensuing season.

== Overview before the season ==
A total of 324 teams make up the league: 27 relegated from the 2022–23 Segunda Federación, 236 retained from the 2022–23 Tercera Federación, and 61 promoted from the regional divisions.

== Groups ==
=== Group 1 – Galicia ===
Location of teams of the 2023–24 Tercera Federación Group 1

Teams retained from 2022–23 Tercera Federación

- Alondras
- Arosa
- Arzúa (Note: Retained due to league expansion.)
- Atlético Arteixo
- Celta C
- Estradense
- UD Ourense
- Paiosaco
- Rápido Bouzas
- Silva
- Somozas
- Viveiro

Teams relegated from 2022–23 Segunda Federación

- Bergantiños
- Polvorín

Teams promoted from 2022–23 Preferente de Galicia

- Barbadás
- Betanzos
- Pontevedra B
- Sarriana

==== Teams and locations ====
Team	City	Home ground
Alondras	Cangas	O Morrazo
Arosa	Vilagarcía de Arousa	A Lomba
Arzúa	Arzúa	Do Viso
Atlético Arteixo	Arteixo	Ponte dos Brozos
Barbadás	Barbadás	Os Carrís
Bergantiños	Carballo	As Eiroas
Betanzos	Betanzos	García Hermanos
Celta C	Vigo	Barreiro
Estradense	A Estrada	Municipal
Polvorín	Lugo	Anxo Carro
Pontevedra B	Pontevedra	Campo de Fútbol A Xunqueira
Ourense	Ourense	O Couto
Paiosaco	A Laracha	Porta Santa
Rápido de Bouzas	Vigo	Baltasar Pujales
Sarriana	Sarria	Municipal de Ribela
Silva	A Coruña	A Grela
Somozas	As Somozas	Pardiñas
Viveiro	Viveiro	Cantarrana

==== League table ====
Pos	Team	Pld	W	D	L	GF	GA	GD	Pts	Qualification
1	Bergantiños (C, P)	34	21	10	3	49	19	+30	73	Promotion to Segunda Federación and qualification for Copa del Rey
2	Gran Peña	34	15	16	3	48	30	+18	61	Qualification for the promotion playoffs
3	Arosa	34	15	13	6	39	23	+16	58	Qualification for the promotion playoffs
4	UD Ourense	34	15	10	9	47	34	+13	55	Qualification for the promotion playoffs
5	Sarriana	34	14	8	12	43	35	+8	50	Qualification for the promotion playoffs
6	Atlético Arteixo	34	11	14	9	46	39	+7	47	
7	Somozas	34	12	9	13	43	39	+4	45 (Note: Somozas finished ahead of Estradense on head-to-head goal difference: Estradense 2–0 Somozas, Somozas 3–0 Estradense)	
8	Estradense	34	11	12	11	31	32	−1	45	
9	Barbadás	34	10	14	10	33	34	−1	44 (Note: Head-to-head points: Barbadás 7 pts, Viveiro 5 pts, Alondras 4 pts)	
10	Viveiro	34	12	8	14	39	42	−3	44	
11	Alondras	34	10	14	10	37	36	+1	44	
12	Silva	34	11	10	13	35	35	0	43 (Note: Head-to-head points: Silva 8 pts, Polvorín 5 pts, Betanzos 2 pts)	
13	Polvorín	34	11	10	13	32	34	−2	43	
14	Betanzos	34	10	13	11	35	31	+4	43	
15	Rápido Bouzas (R)	34	11	9	14	38	40	−2	42	Relegation to Preferente de Galicia
16	Paiosaco (R)	34	10	11	13	30	42	−12	41	Relegation to Preferente de Galicia
17	Pontevedra B (R)	34	7	5	22	27	65	−38	26	Relegation to Preferente de Galicia
18	Arzúa (R)	34	4	6	24	24	66	−42	18	Relegation to Preferente de Galicia

Updated to match(es) played on 12 May 2024. Source:
Rules for classification: 1) points; 2) head-to-head points; 3) head-to-head goal difference; 4) goal difference; 5) number of goals scored
(C) Champions; (P) Promoted; (R) Relegated

=== Group 2 – Asturias ===
Teams retained from 2022–23 Tercera Federación

- Avilés Stadium
- Caudal
- Ceares
- Colunga
- Condal
- L'Entregu
- Lealtad
- Llanera
- Llanes
- Luarca
- Praviano
- Sporting Atlético
- Titánico
- Tuilla

Teams promoted from 2022–23 Primera RFFPA

- Barcia
- Gijón Industrial
- Lenense
- Urraca

==== Teams and locations ====
Location of the 2023–24 Tercera Federación Group 2

Team	City	Home ground
Avilés Stadium	Avilés	Muro de Zaro
Barcia	Barcia, Valdés	San Sebastián
Caudal	Mieres	Hermanos Antuña
Ceares	Gijón	La Cruz
Colunga	Colunga	Santianes
Condal	Noreña	Alejandro Ortea
Gijón Industrial	Gijón	Santa Cruz
L'Entregu	El Entrego, San Martín del Rey Aurelio	Nuevo Nalón
Lealtad	Villaviciosa	Les Caleyes
Lenense	Pona de Lena	El Sóton
Llanera	Llanera	Pepe Quimarán
Llanes	Llanes	San José
Luarca	Luarca, Valdés	La Veigona
Praviano	Pravia	Santa Catalina
Sporting Atlético	Gijón	Pepe Ortiz
Titánico	Laviana	Las Tolvas
Tuilla	Tuilla, Langreo	El Candín
Urraca	Posada de Llanes, Llanes	Campo de La Corredoria

==== League table ====
Pos	Team	Pld	W	D	L	GF	GA	GD	Pts	Qualification
1	Llanera (C, P)	34	28	3	3	105	25	+80	87	Promotion to Segunda Federación and qualification for Copa del Rey
2	Sporting Atlético	34	21	8	5	61	15	+46	71	Qualification for the promotion playoffs
3	Lealtad	34	19	8	7	53	25	+28	65 (Note: Lealtad finished ahead of Ceares on overall goal difference)	Qualification for the promotion playoffs
4	Ceares	34	19	8	7	52	30	+22	65	Qualification for the promotion playoffs
5	L'Entregu	34	18	9	7	51	32	+19	63	Qualification for the promotion playoffs
6	Praviano	34	13	16	5	34	26	+8	55	
7	Tuilla	34	13	13	8	56	43	+13	52	
8	Urraca	34	11	11	12	33	35	−2	44	
9	Caudal	34	9	16	9	35	35	0	43	
10	Colunga	34	11	8	15	38	44	−6	41	
11	Lenense	34	10	8	16	31	45	−14	38	
12	Avilés Stadium	34	8	12	14	30	43	−13	36 (Note: Head-to-head points: Avilés Stadium 7 pts, Titánico 6 pts, Condal 4 pts)	
13	Titánico	34	9	9	16	43	63	−20	36	
14	Condal	34	10	6	18	28	49	−21	36	
15	Llanes (R)	34	9	8	17	36	54	−18	35	Relegation to Primera Asturfútbol
16	Gijón Industrial (R)	34	7	9	18	36	67	−31	30	Relegation to Primera Asturfútbol
17	Luarca (R)	34	6	7	21	38	74	−36	25	Relegation to Primera Asturfútbol
18	Barcia (R)	34	2	7	25	26	81	−55	13	Relegation to Primera Asturfútbol

Updated to match(es) played on 12 May 2024. Source:
Rules for classification: 1) points; 2) head-to-head points; 3) head-to-head goal difference; 4) goal difference; 5) number of goals scored
(C) Champions; (P) Promoted; (R) Relegated

=== Group 3 – Cantabria ===
Teams retained from 2022–23 Tercera Federación

- Atlético Albericia
- Cartes
- Castro
- Escobedo
- Guarnizo
- Naval
- Revilla
- Sámano
- Siete Villas
- Solares-Medio Cudeyo
- Torina
- Tropezón
- Vimenor

Teams relegated from 2022–23 Segunda Federación

- Laredo

Teams promoted from 2022–23 Regional Preferente

- Atlético Mineros
- Bezana
- Colindres
- Velarde

==== Teams and locations ====
Location of teams of the 2023–24 Tercera Federación Group 3

Team	City	Home ground
Atlético Albericia	Santander	Juan Hormaechea
Atlético Mineros	Puente San Miguel	Reocín
Bezana	Santa Cruz de Bezana	Municipal
Cartes	Cartes	El Ansar
Castro	Castro Urdiales	Mioño
Colindres	Colindres	El Carmen
Escobedo	Escobedo, Camargo	Eusebio Arce
Guarnizo	Guarnizo, El Astillero	El Pilar
Laredo	Laredo	San Lorenzo
Naval	Reinosa	San Francisco
Revilla	Revilla, Camargo	El Crucero
Sámano	Sámano, Castro Urdiales	Vallegón
Siete Villas	Castillo Siete Villas, Arnuero	San Pedro
Solares-Medio Cudeyo	Solares, Medio Cudeyo	La Estación
Torina	Bárcena de Pie de Concha	Municipal
Tropezón	Tanos, Torrelavega	Santa Ana
Vimenor	Vioño de Piélagos, Piélagos	La Vidriera
Velarde	Muriedas, Camargo	La Maruca

==== League table ====
Pos	Team	Pld	W	D	L	GF	GA	GD	Pts	Qualification
1	Escobedo (C, P)	34	21	5	8	58	30	+28	68	Promotion to Segunda Federación and qualification for Copa del Rey
2	Laredo (Note: Laredo awarded a 3–0 victory in their Round 7 match against Velarde after the latter fielded an ineligible player. The match originally ended 0–0.) (P)	34	18	7	9	49	22	+27	61	Qualification for the promotion playoffs and Copa del Rey
3	Torina	34	16	12	6	45	37	+8	60	Qualification for the promotion playoffs
4	Atlético Albericia	34	17	7	10	54	37	+17	58	Qualification for the promotion playoffs
5	Vimenor	34	17	6	11	43	32	+11	57	Qualification for the promotion playoffs
6	Tropezón	34	15	11	8	49	38	+11	56 (Note: Tropezón finished ahead of Bezana on head-to-head points: Bezana 1–2 Tropezón, Tropezón 1–1 Bezana)	
7	Bezana	34	17	5	12	49	42	+7	56	
8	Castro	34	16	4	14	41	41	0	52	
9	Guarnizo	34	13	9	12	37	31	+6	48	
10	Revilla	34	12	8	14	41	52	−11	44	
11	Naval	34	9	16	9	39	37	+2	43 (Note: Naval finished ahead of Colindres on head-to-head points: Naval 3–1 Colindres, Colindres 2–2 Naval)	
12	Colindres	34	13	4	17	37	42	−5	43	
13	Siete Villas	34	11	9	14	50	48	+2	42	
14	Sámano	34	11	8	15	40	44	−4	41	
15	Atlético Mineros	34	8	9	17	35	63	−28	33 (Note: Atlético Mineros finished ahead of Solares-Medio Cudeyo on head-to-head points: Atlético Mineros 3–2 Solares-Medio Cudeyo, Solares-Medio Cudeyo 1–1 Atlético Mineros)	
16	Solares-Medio Cudeyo (R)	34	9	6	19	33	54	−21	33	Relegation to Regional Preferente
17	Cartes (R)	34	8	7	19	32	50	−18	31	Relegation to Regional Preferente
18	Velarde (R)	34	3	11	20	29	61	−32	20	Relegation to Regional Preferente

Updated to match(es) played on 11 May 2024. Source:
Rules for classification: 1) points; 2) head-to-head points; 3) head-to-head goal difference; 4) goal difference; 5) number of goals scored
(C) Champions; (P) Promoted; (R) Relegated

=== Group 4 – Basque Country ===
Teams retained from 2022–23 Tercera Federación

- Anaitasuna
- Aurrerá Ondarroa
- Basconia
- Cultural Durango
- Deusto
- Lagun Onak
- Leioa
- Padura
- Pasaia
- Portugalete
- San Ignacio
- Touring
- Urduliz
- Vitoria

Teams relegated from 2022–23 Segunda Federación

- Beasain

Teams promoted from 2022–23 División de Honor

- Alavés C
- Añorga
- Derio

==== Teams and locations ====
Location of teams of the 2023–24 Tercera Federación Group 4

Team	City	Home ground
Alavés C	Vitoria-Gasteiz	José Luis Compañón
Anaitasuna	Azkoitia	Txerloia
Añorga	San Sebastián	Campo de Rezola
Aurrerá Ondarroa	Ondarroa	Zaldupe
Basconia	Basauri	López Cortázar
Beasain	Beasain	Loinaz
Derio	Derio	Ibaiondo
Cultural Durango	Durango	Tabira
Deusto	Bilbao	Etxezuri
Lagun Onak	Azpeitia	Garmendipe
Leioa	Leioa	Sarriena
Padura	Arrigorriaga	Santo Cristo
Pasaia	Pasaia	Don Bosco
Portugalete	Portugalete	La Florida
San Ignacio	Vitoria-Gasteiz	Adurtzabal
Touring	Errenteria	Fandería
Urduliz	Urduliz	Iparralde
Vitoria	Eibar	Unbe

==== League table ====
Pos	Team	Pld	W	D	L	GF	GA	GD	Pts	Qualification
1	Vitoria (C, P)	34	25	7	2	65	17	+48	82	Promotion to Segunda Federación
2	Basconia	34	18	10	6	54	32	+22	64	Qualification for the promotion playoffs
3	Beasain	34	19	6	9	55	36	+19	63	Qualification for the promotion playoffs and Copa del Rey
4	Deusto	34	17	10	7	45	29	+16	61	Qualification for the promotion playoffs
5	Portugalete	34	17	9	8	54	32	+22	60	Qualification for the promotion playoffs
6	Lagun Onak	34	16	9	9	43	33	+10	57	
7	Cultural Durango	34	14	8	12	47	47	0	50	
8	San Ignacio	34	12	11	11	49	44	+5	47	
9	Leioa	34	13	6	15	46	51	−5	45	
10	Urduliz	34	11	9	14	38	47	−9	42 (Note: Urduliz finished ahead of Derio on head-to-head goal difference: Derio 1–3 Urduliz, Urduliz 0–1 Derio)	
11	Derio	34	11	9	14	35	35	0	42	
12	Alavés C	34	10	10	14	34	42	−8	40	
13	Touring	34	9	12	13	39	49	−10	39	
14	Padura	34	9	11	14	33	47	−14	38	
15	Pasaia	34	9	7	18	23	42	−19	34	
16	Anaitasuna (R)	34	8	8	18	35	51	−16	32	Relegation to División de Honor
17	Aurrerá Ondarroa (R)	34	5	9	20	26	54	−28	24	Relegation to División de Honor
18	Añorga (R)	34	3	9	22	31	64	−33	18	Relegation to División de Honor

Updated to match(es) played on 11 May 2024. Source:
Rules for classification: 1) points; 2) head-to-head points; 3) head-to-head goal difference; 4) goal difference; 5) number of goals scored
(C) Champions; (P) Promoted; (R) Relegated

=== Group 5 – Catalonia ===
Location of teams of the 2023–24 Tercera Federación Group 5
Location of teams of the 2023–24 Tercera Federación Group 5 (Province of Barcelona)

Teams retained from 2022–23 Tercera Federación

- Badalona
- Castelldefels
- Girona B
- Grama
- L'Hospitalet
- Montañesa
- Peralada
- Pobla de Mafumet
- Rapitenca
- San Cristóbal
- Tona
- Vilafranca
- Vilassar de Mar

Teams relegated from 2022–23 Segunda Federación

- Olot
- Prat

Teams promoted from 2022–23 Primera Catalana

- L'Escala
- Mollerussa
- Reus FCR

==== Teams and locations ====
Team	City	Home ground
Badalona	Badalona	Municipal de Badalona
Castelldefels	Castelldefels	Els Canyars
Girona B	Girona	Torres de Palau
Grama	Santa Coloma de Gramenet	Can Peixauet
L'Escala	L'Escala	Estadi Municipal
L'Hospitalet	L'Hospitalet de Llobregat	Municipal de l'Hospitalet de Llobregat
Montañesa	Barcelona	Nou Barris
Mollerussa	Mollerussa	Camp Municipal
Olot	Olot	Municipal
Peralada	Peralada	Municipal de Peralada
Pobla de Mafumet	La Pobla de Mafumet	Municipal de la Pobla de Mafumet
Prat	El Prat	Sagnier
Rapitenca	Sant Carles de la Ràpita	La Devesa
Reus FCR	Reus	Municipal de Reus
San Cristóbal	Terrassa	Ca n'Anglada
Tona	Tona	Municipal
Vilafranca	Vilafranca del Penedès	ZEM de Vilafranca del Penedès
Vilassar de Mar	Vilassar de Mar	Xevi Ramón

==== League table ====
Pos	Team	Pld	W	D	L	GF	GA	GD	Pts	Qualification
1	Olot (C, P)	34	24	7	3	55	20	+35	79	Promotion to Segunda Federación and qualification for Copa del Rey
2	L'Hospitalet	34	22	3	9	56	28	+28	69	Qualification for the promotion playoffs and Copa del Rey
3	Vilassar de Mar	34	17	9	8	41	27	+14	60	Qualification for the promotion playoffs
4	Badalona	34	16	7	11	44	36	+8	55	Qualification for the promotion playoffs
5	Prat	34	13	12	9	39	30	+9	51	Qualification for the promotion playoffs
6	Tona	34	13	9	12	48	45	+3	48 (Note: Tona finished ahead of L'Escala on head-to-head points: L'Escala 0–2 Tona, Tona 1–1 L'Escala)	
7	L'Escala	34	14	6	14	57	59	−2	48	
8	Reus FCR	34	12	10	12	31	28	+3	46 (Note: Reus FCR finished ahead of Montañesa on head-to-head points: Reus FCR 2–0 Montañesa, Montañesa 0–3 Reus FCR)	
9	Montañesa	34	13	7	14	32	39	−7	46	
10	Grama	34	13	6	15	41	47	−6	45	
11	Girona B	34	11	11	12	49	40	+9	44	
12	Mollerussa	34	12	7	15	33	46	−13	43 (Note: Mollerussa finished ahead of San Cristóbal on head-to-head points: Mollerussa 1–0 San Cristóbal, San Cristóbal 0–2 Mollerussa)	
13	San Cristóbal	34	13	4	17	35	54	−19	43	
14	Peralada	34	11	9	14	34	34	0	42	
15	Pobla de Mafumet (R)	34	10	8	16	31	39	−8	38	Relegation to Lliga Elit
16	Vilafranca (R)	34	8	9	17	31	53	−22	33	Relegation to Lliga Elit
17	Castelldefels (R)	34	7	9	18	30	47	−17	30 (Note: Castelledefels finished ahead of Rapitenca on head-to-head points: Castelldefels 0–0 Rapitenca, Rapitenca 0–1 Castelldefels)	Relegation to Lliga Elit
18	Rapitenca (R)	34	9	3	22	36	51	−15	30	Relegation to Lliga Elit

Updated to match(es) played on 12 May 2024. Source:
Rules for classification: 1) points; 2) head-to-head points; 3) head-to-head goal difference; 4) goal difference; 5) number of goals scored
(C) Champions; (P) Promoted; (R) Relegated

=== Group 6 – Valencian Community ===
Location of teams of the 2023–24 Tercera Federación Group 6

Teams retained from 2022–23 Tercera Federación

- Acero
- Athletic Torrellano
- Atlético Levante
- Atzeneta
- Castellón B
- Elche Ilicitano
- Gandía
- Jove Español
- Patacona
- Rayo Ibense
- Roda
- Silla
- Villarreal C

Teams promoted from 2022–23 Regional Preferente

- Burriana
- Castellonense
- Ontinyent 1931
- Soneja
- Utiel

==== Teams and locations ====
Team	City	Home ground
Acero	Sagunto	El Fornàs
Athletic Torrellano	Torrellano, Elche	Municipal
Atlético Levante	Valencia	Ciudad Deportiva de Buñol
Atzeneta	Atzeneta d'Albaida	El Regit
Burriana	Burriana	Municipal San Fernando
Castellonense	Castelló	Camp Municipal de L'Almenà
Castellón B	Castellón	Ciudad Deportiva
Elche Ilicitano	Elche	José Díaz Iborra
Gandía	Gandía	Guillermo Olagüe
Jove Español	San Vicente del Raspeig	Ciudad Deportiva
Ontinyent 1931	Ontinyent	El Clariano
Patacona	Alboraya	Municipal
Rayo Ibense	Ibi	Francisco Vilaplana Mariel
Roda	Villarreal	Pamesa Cerámica
Silla	Silla	Vincent Morera
Soneja	Soneja	El Arco
Utiel	Utiel	La Celadilla
Villarreal C	Villarreal	Pamesa Cerámica

==== League table ====
Pos	Team	Pld	W	D	L	GF	GA	GD	Pts	Qualification
1	Elche Ilicitano (C, P)	34	26	5	3	77	20	+57	83	Promotion to Segunda Federación
2	Jove Español	34	18	10	6	46	23	+23	64	Qualification for the promotion playoffs and Copa del Rey
3	Ontinyent 1931	34	18	6	10	39	29	+10	60 (Note: Ontinyent 1931 finished ahead of Atzeneta on head-to-head points: Atzeneta 0–1 Ontinyent 1931, Ontinyent 1931 1–0 Atzeneta)	Qualification for the promotion playoffs
4	Atzeneta	34	16	12	6	44	27	+17	60	Qualification for the promotion playoffs
5	Utiel	34	15	8	11	43	39	+4	53	Qualification for the promotion playoffs
6	Atlético Levante	34	13	11	10	44	35	+9	50	
7	Gandía	34	13	9	12	45	41	+4	48	
8	Villarreal C	34	12	10	12	53	44	+9	46	
9	Roda	34	12	8	14	35	32	+3	44	
10	Athletic Torrellano	34	11	9	14	34	40	−6	42	
11	Castellonense	34	10	11	13	38	45	−7	41	
12	Soneja	34	9	13	12	38	46	−8	40 (Note: Head-to-head points: Soneja 7 pts, Patacona 7 pts, Castellón B 3 pts. Soneja finished ahead of Patacona on head-to-head points: Soneja 3–1 Patacona, Patacona 1–1 Soneja)	
13	Patacona	34	11	7	16	40	52	−12	40	
14	Castellón B	34	12	4	18	44	52	−8	40	
15	Rayo Ibense	34	11	6	17	28	43	−15	39	
16	Acero (R)	34	9	8	17	39	56	−17	35	Relegation to Regional Preferente
17	Burriana (R)	34	8	9	17	26	46	−20	33	Relegation to Regional Preferente
18	Silla (R)	34	7	4	23	27	70	−43	25	Relegation to Regional Preferente

Updated to match(es) played on 12 May 2024. Source:
Rules for classification: 1) points; 2) head-to-head points; 3) head-to-head goal difference; 4) goal difference; 5) number of goals scored
(C) Champions; (P) Promoted; (R) Relegated

=== Group 7 – Community of Madrid ===
Location of teams of the 2023–24 Tercera Federación Group 7

Teams retained from 2022–23 Tercera Federación

- Alcalá
- Canillas
- Collado Villalba
- Galapagar
- Las Rozas
- Móstoles URJC
- Paracuellos Antamira
- Pozuelo de Alarcón
- Rayo Vallecano B
- Real Madrid C (Note: Real Madrid C took the place of RSC Internacional after an agreement between both clubs was reached in 2022.)
- Torrejón
- Trival Valderas

Teams relegated from 2022–23 Segunda Federación

- Alcorcón B
- Leganés B

Teams promoted from 2022–23 Preferente de Madrid

- Moscardó
- Parla
- Tres Cantos
- Villanueva del Pardillo

==== Teams and locations ====
Team	City	Home ground
Alcalá	Alcalá de Henares	Municipal del Val
Alcorcón B	Alcorcón	Anexo de Santo Domingo
Canillas	Madrid	Canillas
Collado Villalba	Collado Villalba	Ciudad Deportiva
Galapagar	Galapagar	El Chopo
Leganés B	Leganés	Instalación Deportiva Butarque
Las Rozas	Las Rozas	Dehesa de Navalcarbón
Moscardó	Madrid	Román Valero
Móstoles URJC	Móstoles	El Soto
Paracuellos Antamira	Majadahonda	La Oliva
Parla	Parla	Los Prados
Pozuelo de Alarcón	Pozuelo de Alarcón	Valle de las Cañas
Rayo Vallecano B	Madrid	Ciudad Deportiva
Real Madrid C	Madrid	Ciudad Real Madrid
Torrejón	Torrejón de Ardoz	Las Veredillas
Tres Cantos	Tres Cantos	La Foresta A
Trival Valderas	Alcorcón	La Canaleja
Villanueva del Pardillo	Villanueva del Pardillo	Juan Manuel Angelina

==== League table ====
Pos	Team	Pld	W	D	L	GF	GA	GD	Pts	Qualification
1	Real Madrid C (C, P)	34	23	7	4	62	18	+44	76	Promotion to Segunda Federación
2	Móstoles URJC (Note: Móstoles URJC purchased the spot in 2024–25 Segunda Federación vacated by the administrative relegation of Ursaria.) (P)	34	17	12	5	57	33	+24	63	Qualification for the promotion playoffs and Copa del Rey
3	Leganés B	34	16	10	8	47	33	+14	58	Qualification for the promotion playoffs
4	Las Rozas	34	13	11	10	51	39	+12	50 (Note: Las Rozas finished ahead of Moscardó on head-to-head points: Moscardó 3–3 Las Rozas, Las Rozas 1–0 Moscardó)	Qualification for the promotion playoffs
5	Moscardó (P)	34	14	8	12	48	48	0	50	Qualification for the promotion playoffs
6	Alcalá	34	13	9	12	52	47	+5	48 (Note: Alcalá finished ahead of Tres Cantos on overall goal difference)	
7	Tres Cantos	34	14	6	14	45	48	−3	48	
8	Alcorcón B	34	11	12	11	36	33	+3	45	
9	Torrejón	34	9	17	8	40	38	+2	44	
10	Galapagar	34	10	11	13	44	55	−11	41	
11	Paracuellos Antamira	34	10	10	14	39	47	−8	40 (Note: Head-to-head points: Paracuellos Antamira 10 pts, Trival Valderas 5 pts, Canillas 1 pt)	
12	Trival Valderas	34	8	16	10	33	40	−7	40	
13	Canillas (Note: Canillas awarded a 3–0 victory in their Round 11 match against Galapagar after the latter fielded an ineligible player. The match originally ended 0–2.)	34	10	10	14	35	46	−11	40	
14	Collado Villalba	34	10	9	15	42	46	−4	39 (Note: Collado Villalba finished ahead of Rayo Vallecano B on head-to-head points: Rayo Vallecano B 0–1 Collado Villalba, Collado Villalba 3–0 Rayo Vallecano B)	
15	Rayo Vallecano B	34	11	6	17	43	57	−14	39	
16	Parla (R)	34	9	11	14	37	47	−10	38	Relegation to Preferente de Madrid
17	Villanueva del Pardillo (R)	34	8	11	15	27	39	−12	35	Relegation to Preferente de Madrid
18	Pozuelo de Alarcón (R)	34	5	14	15	28	52	−24	29	Relegation to Preferente de Madrid

Updated to match(es) played on 12 May 2024. Source:
Rules for classification: 1) points; 2) head-to-head points; 3) head-to-head goal difference; 4) goal difference; 5) number of goals scored
(C) Champions; (P) Promoted; (R) Relegated

=== Group 8 – Castile and León ===
Teams retained from 2022–23 Tercera Federación

- Almazán
- Atlético Astorga
- Atlético Bembibre
- Atlético Tordesillas
- Ávila
- Becerril
- Júpiter Leonés
- La Virgen del Camino
- Mirandés B
- Palencia
- Ponferradina B
- Salamanca
- Santa Marta

Teams relegated from 2022–23 Segunda Federación

- Burgos Promesas
- Cristo Atlético

Teams promoted from 2022–23 Primera Regional

- Colegios Diocesanos
- Laguna
- Villaralbo

==== Teams and locations ====
Location of teams of the 2023–24 Tercera Federación Group 8

Team	City	Home ground
Almazán	Almazán	La Arboleda
Atlético Astorga	Astorga	La Eragudina
Atlético Bembibre	Bembibre	La Devesa
Atlético Tordesillas	Tordesillas	Las Salinas
Ávila	Ávila	Adolfo Suárez
Becerril	Becerril de Campos	Mariano Haro
Burgos Promesas	Burgos	Castañares
Colegios Diocesanos	Ávila	Sancti Spiritu
Cristo Atlético	Palencia	Nueva Balastera
Júpiter Leonés	León	Puente Castro
La Virgen del Camino	La Virgen del Camino, Valverde de la Virgen	Los Dominicos
Laguna	Laguna de Duero	La Laguna
Mirandés B	Miranda de Ebro	Ence
Palencia	Palencia	Nueva Balastera
Ponferradina B	Ponferrada	Compostilla
Salamanca	Salamanca	Helmántico
Santa Marta	Santa Marta de Tormes	Alfonso San Casto
Villaralbo	Villaralbo	Ciudad Deportiva Fernández Garcia

==== League table ====
Pos	Team	Pld	W	D	L	GF	GA	GD	Pts	Qualification
1	Ávila (C, P)	34	23	7	4	52	20	+32	76	Promotion to Segunda Federación and qualification for Copa del Rey
2	Salamanca (P)	34	21	10	3	62	16	+46	73	Qualification for the promotion playoffs and Copa del Rey
3	Atlético Tordesillas	34	19	8	7	44	23	+21	65	Qualification for the promotion playoffs
4	Júpiter Leonés	34	18	9	7	52	26	+26	63	Qualification for the promotion playoffs
5	Atlético Astorga	34	15	11	8	39	24	+15	56	Qualification for the promotion playoffs
6	Cristo Atlético	34	15	10	9	41	26	+15	55	
7	Palencia	34	14	11	9	31	28	+3	53	
8	Becerril	34	15	6	13	38	42	−4	51	
9	Santa Marta	34	11	10	13	36	43	−7	43	
10	La Virgen del Camino	34	10	11	13	36	42	−6	41 (Note: Head-to-head points: La Virgen del Camino 8 pts, Almazán 5 pts, Atlético Bembibre 2 pts)	
11	Almazán	34	11	8	15	34	42	−8	41	
12	Atlético Bembibre	34	10	11	13	34	39	−5	41	
13	Burgos Promesas	34	10	10	14	30	39	−9	40	
14	Mirandés B	34	8	11	15	28	38	−10	35	
15	Villaralbo	34	8	9	17	30	45	−15	33	
16	Laguna	34	8	5	21	27	57	−30	29	
17	Colegios Diocesanos (R)	34	4	13	17	14	41	−27	25	Relegation to Primera Regional
18	Ponferradina B (R)	34	2	8	24	22	59	−37	14	Relegation to Primera Regional

Updated to match(es) played on 12 May 2024. Source:
Rules for classification: 1) points; 2) head-to-head points; 3) head-to-head goal difference; 4) goal difference; 5) number of goals scored
(C) Champions; (P) Promoted; (R) Relegated

=== Group 9 – Eastern Andalusia and Melilla ===
Teams retained from 2022–23 Tercera Federación

- Almería B
- Arenas
- Atlético Malagueño
- Ciudad de Torredonjimeno
- Huétor Tájar
- Huétor Vega
- Jaén
- Málaga City
- Maracena
- Motril
- Torre del Mar
- Torreperogil

Teams relegated from 2022–23 Segunda Federación

- Atlético Mancha Real
- El Ejido
- Juventud Torremolinos

Teams promoted from 2022–23 División de Honor

- Polideportivo Almería
- Rincón

Teams promoted from 2022–23 Primera Autonómica de Melilla

- Atlético Melilla

==== Teams and locations ====
Location of teams of the 2023–24 Tercera Federación Group 9
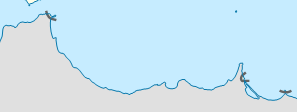
Location of teams of the 2023–24 Tercera Federación Group 9 – Melilla

Team	City	Home ground
Almería B	Almería	Estadio de los Juegos Mediterráneos
Arenas	Armilla	Municipal
Atlético Malagueño	Málaga	El Viso
Mancha Real	Mancha Real	La Juventud
Atlético Melilla	Melilla	La Espiguera
Ciudad de Torredonjimeno	Torredonjimeno	Matías Prats
El Ejido	El Ejido	Santo Domingo
Huétor Tájar	Huétor-Tájar	Miguel Moranto
Huétor Vega	Huétor Vega	Las Viñas
Jaén	Jaén	La Victoria
Juventud Torremolinos	Torremolinos	El Pozuelo
Málaga City	Nerja	Pepe Luis Boadilla
Maracena	Maracena	Ciudad Deportiva
Motril	Motril	Escribano Castilla
Polideportivo Almería	Almería	Juventud Campra
Rincón	Rincón de la Victoria	Francisco Romero
Torre del Mar	Torre del Mar	Juan Manuel Azuaga
Torreperogil	Torreperogil	Abdón Martínez Fariñas

==== League table ====
Pos	Team	Pld	W	D	L	GF	GA	GD	Pts	Qualification
1	Juventud Torremolinos (C, P)	34	23	7	4	65	23	+42	76	Promotion to Segunda Federación and qualification for Copa del Rey
2	Jaén	34	22	7	5	66	28	+38	73	Qualification for the promotion playoffs and Copa del Rey
3	Atlético Malagueño	34	19	10	5	54	20	+34	67 (Note: Atlético Malagueño finished ahead of Almería B on head-to-head points: Atlético Malagueño 0–0 Almería B, Almería B 0–2 Atlético Malagueño)	Qualification for the promotion playoffs
4	Almería B (P)	34	19	10	5	75	28	+47	67	Qualification for the promotion playoffs
5	Torre del Mar	34	18	8	8	44	30	+14	62	Qualification for the promotion playoffs
6	Motril	34	13	11	10	36	23	+13	50	
7	Arenas	34	14	6	14	34	39	−5	48	
8	Polideportivo Almería	34	11	13	10	39	37	+2	46 (Note: Polideportivo Almería finished ahead of Huétor Vega on head-to-head points: Huétor Vega 0–0 Polideportivo Almería, Polideportivo Almería 4–1 Huétor Vega)	
9	Huétor Vega	34	13	7	14	40	41	−1	46	
10	Ciudad de Torredonjimeno	34	11	10	13	46	46	0	43	
11	Atlético Mancha Real	34	9	12	13	41	43	−2	39	
12	Torreperogil	34	9	11	14	32	41	−9	38	
13	El Ejido	34	7	16	11	30	41	−11	37	
14	Huétor Tájar	34	7	14	13	25	39	−14	35	
15	Málaga City	34	7	12	15	27	47	−20	33	
16	Maracena (R)	34	6	13	15	29	50	−21	31	Relegation to División de Honor
17	Rincón (R)	34	6	10	18	30	54	−24	28	Relegation to División de Honor
18	Atlético Melilla (R)	34	0	7	27	18	101	−83	4 (Note: Motril awarded a 3–0 win in their Round 25 match against Atlético Melilla after the latter's players invaded the stands. The match was originally suspended at half-time. Atlético Melilla was also deducted 3 points.)	Relegation to División de Honor

Updated to match(es) played on 12 May 2024. Source:
Rules for classification: 1) points; 2) head-to-head points; 3) head-to-head goal difference; 4) goal difference; 5) number of goals scored
(C) Champions; (P) Promoted; (R) Relegated

=== Group 10 – Western Andalusia and Ceuta ===
Teams retained from 2022–23 Tercera Federación

- Atlético Espeleño
- Ayamonte
- Bollullos
- Cartaya
- Ceuta B
- Ciudad de Lucena
- Conil
- Córdoba B
- Coria
- Gerena
- Pozoblanco
- Puente Genil
- Sevilla C
- Xerez

Teams relegated from 2022–23 Segunda Federación

- Utrera
- Xerez Deportivo

Teams promoted from 2022–23 División de Honor

- Cabecense
- La Palma

==== Teams and locations ====
Location of teams of the 2023–24 Tercera Federación Group 10

Team	City	Home ground
Atlético Espeleño	Espiel	Municipal
Ayamonte	Ayamonte	Ciudad de Ayamonte
Bollullos	Bollullos Par del Condado	Eloy Ávila Cano
Cabecense	Las Cabezas de San Juan	Carlos Marchena
Cartaya	Cartaya	Luis Rodríguez Salvador
Ceuta B	Ceuta	Alfonso Murube
Ciudad de Lucena	Lucena	Ciudad de Lucena
Conil	Conil de la Frontera	José Antonio Pérez Ureba
Córdoba B	Córdoba	Rafael Gómez
Coria	Coria del Río	Guadalquivir
Gerena	Gerena	José Juan Romero Gil
La Palma	La Palma del Condado	Polideportivo Municipal
Pozoblanco	Pozoblanco	Municipal
Puente Genil	Puente Genil	Manuel Polinario
Sevilla C	Seville	José Ramón Cisneros Palacios
Utrera	Utrera	San Juan Bosco
Xerez	Jerez de la Frontera	La Juventud
Xerez Deportivo	Jerez de la Frontera	Chapín

==== League table ====
Pos	Team	Pld	W	D	L	GF	GA	GD	Pts	Qualification
1	Xerez (C, P)	34	19	10	5	53	21	+32	67	Promotion to Segunda Federación and qualification for Copa del Rey
2	Ciudad de Lucena	34	19	9	6	39	21	+18	66	Qualification for the promotion playoffs and Copa del Rey
3	Xerez Deportivo (P)	34	18	10	6	50	23	+27	64	Qualification for the promotion playoffs
4	Pozoblanco	34	18	8	8	49	36	+13	62	Qualification for the promotion playoffs
5	Ceuta B	34	15	11	8	47	27	+20	56	Qualification for the promotion playoffs
6	Puente Genil	34	13	15	6	52	45	+7	54	
7	Gerena	34	14	7	13	38	40	−2	49	
8	Utrera	34	13	7	14	50	48	+2	46	
9	Cartaya	34	12	9	13	35	34	+1	45	
10	La Palma	34	11	8	15	49	52	−3	41	
11	Bollullos	34	8	14	12	31	44	−13	38	
12	Conil	34	9	10	15	29	40	−11	37 (Note: Head-to-head points: Conil 7 pts, Córdoba B 5 pts, Atlético Espeleño 3 pts)	
13	Córdoba B	34	8	13	13	37	43	−6	37	
14	Atlético Espeleño	34	10	7	17	41	53	−12	37	
15	Coria	34	9	9	16	42	54	−12	36	
16	Sevilla C	34	8	11	15	28	35	−7	35	
17	Ayamonte (R)	34	7	11	16	32	47	−15	32	Relegation to División de Honor
18	Cabecense (R)	34	7	7	20	25	64	−39	28	Relegation to División de Honor

Updated to match(es) played on 12 May 2024. Source:
Rules for classification: 1) points; 2) head-to-head points; 3) head-to-head goal difference; 4) goal difference; 5) number of goals scored
(C) Champions; (P) Promoted; (R) Relegated

=== Group 11 – Balearic Islands ===
Teams retained from 2022–23 Tercera Federación

- Binissalem
- Collerense
- Constància
- Inter Manacor
- Llosetense
- Manacor
- Mercadal
- Platges de Calvià
- Poblense
- Portmany
- Santanyí
- Sóller

Teams relegated from 2022–23 Segunda Federación

- Ibiza Islas Pitiusas
- Mallorca B

Teams promoted from 2022–23 Regional Preferente

- Alaior
- Alcúdia
- Arenal
- Felanitx

==== Teams and locations ====
Location of teams of the 2023–24 Tercera Federación Group 11

Team	City	Home ground
Alaior	Alaior	Els Pins
Alcúdia	Alcúdia	Els Arcs
Arenal	S'Arenal de Llucmajor	Camp Municipal
Binissalem	Binissalem	Miquel Pons
Collerense	Es Coll d'en Rabassa, Palma	Ca Na Paulina
Constància	Inca	Municipal
Felanitx	Felanitx	Es Torrentó
Ibiza Islas Pitiusas	Ibiza	Can Misses
Inter Manacor	Manacor	Na Capellera
Llosetense	Lloseta	Municipal
Mallorca B	Palma	Son Bibiloni
Manacor	Manacor	Na Capellera
Mercadal	Es Mercadal	San Martí
Platges de Calvià	Magaluf, Calvià	Municipal de Magaluf
Poblense	Sa Pobla	Nou Camp
Portmany	Sant Antoni de Portmany	Sant Antoni
Santanyí	Santanyí	Municipal
Sóller	Sóller	En Maiol

==== League table ====
Pos	Team	Pld	W	D	L	GF	GA	GD	Pts	Qualification
1	Ibiza Islas Pitiusas (C, P)	34	27	6	1	73	15	+58	87	Promotion to Segunda Federación and qualification for Copa del Rey
2	Mallorca B (P)	34	22	8	4	72	16	+56	74 (Note: Mallorca B finished ahead of Poblense on head-to-head points: Poblense 0–0 Mallorca B, Mallorca B 2–1 Poblense)	Qualification for the promotion playoffs
3	Poblense	34	22	8	4	63	15	+48	74	Qualification for the promotion playoffs
4	Platges de Calvià	34	18	9	7	47	22	+25	63	Qualification for the promotion playoffs
5	Manacor	34	19	5	10	59	40	+19	62	Qualification for the promotion playoffs
6	Santanyí	34	16	8	10	46	23	+23	56	
7	Constància	34	15	8	11	44	32	+12	53	
8	Alcúdia	34	14	7	13	54	44	+10	49 (Note: Alcúdia finished ahead of Llosetense on head-to-head goal difference: Alcúdia 1–2 Llosetense, Llosetense 0–2 Alcúdia)	
9	Llosetense	34	14	7	13	37	38	−1	49	
10	Mercadal	34	12	9	13	33	37	−4	45	
11	Binissalem	34	12	7	15	35	38	−3	43	
12	Portmany	34	11	9	14	38	38	0	42	
13	Collerense	34	10	8	16	39	55	−16	38	
14	Felanitx	34	10	5	19	37	53	−16	35	
15	Alaior (R)	34	8	7	19	27	51	−24	31	Relegation to Regional
16	Arenal (R)	34	6	8	20	28	59	−31	26	Relegation to Regional
17	Sóller (R)	34	4	5	25	26	98	−72	17	Relegation to Regional
18	Inter Manacor (R)	34	2	4	28	22	106	−84	10	Relegation to Regional

Updated to match(es) played on 12 May 2024. Source:
Rules for classification: 1) points; 2) head-to-head points; 3) head-to-head goal difference; 4) goal difference; 5) number of goals scored
(C) Champions; (P) Promoted; (R) Relegated

=== Group 12 – Canary Islands ===
Teams retained from 2022–23 Tercera Federación

- Arucas
- Gran Tarajal
- Ibarra
- La Cuadra
- Lanzarote
- Las Palmas Atlético
- Marino
- Panadería Pulido
- Santa Úrsula
- Tamaraceite
- Tenerife B
- Unión Sur Yaiza
- Villa de Santa Brígida

Teams promoted from 2022–23 Interinsular Preferente

- Atlético Victoria
- Buzanada
- Herbania
- San Bartolomé
- Teror

==== Teams and locations ====
Location of teams of the 2023–24 Tercera Federación Group 12

Team	City	Home ground
Arucas	Arucas	Tonono
Atlético Victoria	La Victoria de Acentejo	Municipal
Buzanada	Buzanada, Arona	Clementina de Bello
Gran Tarajal	Tuineje	Municipal
Herbania	Puerto del Rosario	Municipal de Los Pozos
Ibarra	Las Galletas, Arona	Villa Isabel
La Cuadra	Puerto del Rosario	Municipal de Los Pozos
Lanzarote	Arrecife	Ciudad Deportiva
Las Palmas Atlético	Las Palmas	Anexo Gran Canaria
Marino	Los Cristianos, Arona	Antonio Domínguez Alfonso
Panadería Pulido	Vega de San Mateo	San Mateo
San Bartolomé	San Bartolomé	Municipal Pedro Espinosa de León
Santa Úrsula	Santa Úrsula	Argelio Tabares
Tamaraceite	Las Palmas	Juan Guedes
Tenerife B	Santa Cruz de Tenerife	Centro Insular
Teror	Teror	El Pino
Unión Sur Yaiza	Yaiza	Municipal
Villa de Santa Brígida	Santa Brígida	El Guiniguada

==== League table ====
Pos	Team	Pld	W	D	L	GF	GA	GD	Pts	Qualification
1	Tenerife B (C, P)	34	24	8	2	68	22	+46	80	Promotion to Segunda Federación
2	Lanzarote	34	22	9	3	63	28	+35	75	Qualification for the promotion playoffs and Copa del Rey
3	Unión Sur Yaiza (P)	34	21	11	2	62	19	+43	74 (Note: Unión Sur Yaiza finished ahead of Las Palmas Atlético on head-to-head points: Unión Sur Yaiza 2–1 Las Palmas Atlético, Las Palmas Atlético 1–3 Unión Sur Yaiza)	Qualification for the promotion playoffs
4	Las Palmas Atlético	34	22	8	4	74	24	+50	74	Qualification for the promotion playoffs
5	Panadería Pulido	34	15	10	9	52	39	+13	55	Qualification for the promotion playoffs
6	Arucas	34	11	14	9	51	41	+10	47	
7	Santa Úrsula	34	10	13	11	35	38	−3	43	
8	San Bartolomé	34	10	12	12	43	42	+1	42	
9	Villa Santa Brígida	34	9	14	11	41	36	+5	41 (Note: Villa Santa Brígida finished ahead of Tamaraceite on head-to-head points: Tamaraceite 1–2 Villa Santa Brígida, Villa Santa Brígida 3–3 Tamaraceite)	
10	Tamaraceite	34	11	8	15	42	56	−14	41	
11	Marino	34	10	9	15	42	53	−11	39 (Note: Marino finished ahead of Buzanada on overall goal difference)	
12	Buzanada	34	9	12	13	29	42	−13	39	
13	Herbania	34	9	11	14	30	45	−15	38	
14	Ibarra	34	9	9	16	35	45	−10	36	
15	Atlético Victoria (R)	34	8	8	18	33	53	−20	32	Relegation to Interinsular Preferente
16	Teror (R)	34	6	8	20	29	67	−38	26	Relegation to Interinsular Preferente
17	Gran Tarajal (R)	34	4	12	18	21	54	−33	24	Relegation to Interinsular Preferente
18	La Cuadra (R)	34	6	4	24	26	72	−46	22	Relegation to Interinsular Preferente

Updated to match(es) played on 12 May 2024. Source:
Rules for classification: 1) points; 2) head-to-head points; 3) head-to-head goal difference; 4) goal difference; 5) number of goals scored
(C) Champions; (P) Promoted; (R) Relegated

=== Group 13 – Region of Murcia ===
Teams retained from 2022–23 Tercera Federación

- Alcantarilla
- Atlético Pulpileño
- Bullense
- Caravaca
- Cieza
- Ciudad de Murcia
- El Palmar
- Lorca Deportiva
- Minera
- Muleño
- Murcia Imperial
- Racing Murcia
- UCAM Murcia B
- Unión Molinense

Teams promoted from 2022–23 Preferente Autonómica

- Algar
- Balsicas Atlético
- Montecasillas
- Plus Ultra

==== Teams and locations ====
Location of teams of the 2023–24 Tercera Federación Group 13

Team	City	Home ground
Alcantarilla	Alcantarilla	Ángel Sornichero
Algar	El Algar, Cartagena	Sánchez Luengo
Atlético Pulpileño	Pulpí (Andalusia)	San Miguel
Balsicas Atlético	Balsicas, Torre-Pacheco	Municipal Los Cipreses
Bullense	Bullas	Nicolás de las Peñas
Caravaca	Caravaca de la Cruz	El Morao
Cieza	Cieza	La Arboleja
Ciudad de Murcia	Murcia	José Barnés
El Palmar	El Palmar, Murcia	Municipal
Lorca Deportiva	Lorca	Francisco Artés Carrasco
Minera	Llano del Beal, Cartagena	Ángel Cedrán
Montecasillas	Casillas, Murcia	Municipal Juan Pérez
Muleño	Mula	Municipal
Murcia Imperial	Murcia	Campus Universitario
Plus Ultra	Llano de Brujas, Murcia	Municipal
Racing Murcia	Dolores de Pacheco, Torre-Pacheco	Polideportivo Municipal
UCAM Murcia B	Sangonera la Verde	El Mayayo
Unión Molinense	Molina de Segura	Sánchez Cánovas

==== League table ====
Pos	Team	Pld	W	D	L	GF	GA	GD	Pts	Qualification
1	Minera (C, P)	34	24	6	4	53	19	+34	78	Promotion to Segunda Federación and qualification for Copa del Rey
2	Murcia Imperial	34	20	8	6	67	33	+34	68 (Note: Murcia Imperial finished ahead of Cieza on head-to-head points: Cieza 1–1 Murcia Imperial, Murcia Imperial 3–0 Cieza)	Qualification for the promotion playoffs
3	Cieza	34	19	11	4	44	24	+20	68	Qualification for the promotion playoffs
4	UCAM Murcia B (Note: UCAM Murcia B is ineligible for promotion, as their parent club UCAM Murcia will participate in the Segunda Federación)	34	19	5	10	42	24	+18	62	
5	Caravaca	34	18	7	9	60	32	+28	61	Qualification for the promotion playoffs
6	Lorca Deportiva	34	17	8	9	64	30	+34	59 (Note: Lorca Deportiva finished ahead of Unión Molinense on overall goal difference)	Qualification for the promotion playoffs
7	Unión Molinense	34	18	5	11	60	34	+26	59	
8	Atlético Pulpileño	34	13	13	8	39	23	+16	52	
9	Muleño	34	12	7	15	37	42	−5	43	
10	Racing Murcia (Note: Racing Murcia was relegated due to the relegation of their parent club, Racing Cartagena Mar Menor from the 2023–24 Segunda Federación.) (R)	34	11	7	16	36	51	−15	40	Relegation to Preferente Autonómica
11	Plus Ultra	34	12	2	20	43	56	−13	38	
12	El Palmar	34	9	9	16	33	52	−19	36 (Note: Head-to-head points: El Palmar 14 pts, Bullense 8 pts, Alcantarilla 5 pts, Balsicas Atlético 5 pts. Alcantarilla finished ahead of Balsicas Atlético on overall goal difference)	
13	Bullense	34	10	6	18	40	65	−25	36	
14	Alcantarilla	34	10	6	18	34	41	−7	36	
15	Balsicas Atlético	34	9	9	16	35	53	−18	36	
16	Ciudad de Murcia (R)	34	7	9	18	28	43	−15	30	Relegation to Preferente Autonómica
17	Algar (R)	34	7	8	19	31	65	−34	29	Relegation to Preferente Autonómica
18	Montecasillas (R)	34	7	2	25	31	90	−59	23	Relegation to Preferente Autonómica

Updated to match(es) played on 12 May 2024. Source:
Rules for classification: 1) points; 2) head-to-head points; 3) head-to-head goal difference; 4) goal difference; 5) number of goals scored
(C) Champions; (P) Promoted; (R) Relegated

=== Group 14 – Extremadura ===
Teams retained from 2022–23 Tercera Federación

- Arroyo
- Atlético Pueblonuevo
- Azuaga
- Calamonte
- Don Álvaro
- Fuente de Cantos
- Jerez
- Montehermoso
- Moralo
- Olivenza
- Trujillo
- Villafranca

Teams relegated from 2022–23 Segunda Federación

- Coria
- Diocesano
- Don Benito

Teams promoted from 2022–23 Primera División Extremeña

- Castuera
- Jaraíz
- Racing Valverdeño

==== Teams and locations ====
Location of teams of the 2023–24 Tercera Federación Group 14

Team	City	Home ground
Arroyo	Arroyo de la Luz	Municipal
Atlético Pueblonuevo	Pueblonuevo del Guadiana	Antonio Amaya
Azuaga	Azuaga	Municipal
Calamonte	Calamonte	Municipal
Castuera	Castuera	Manuel Ruiz
Coria	Coria	La Isla
Diocesano	Cáceres	Campos de La Federación
Don Álvaro	Don Álvaro	Manuel Barrero Pedro Macias
Don Benito	Don Benito	Vicente Sanz
Fuente de Cantos	Fuente de Cantos	Francisco de Zurbarán
Jaraíz	Jaraíz de la Vera	Municipal
Jerez	Jerez de los Caballeros	Manuel Calzado Galván
Montehermoso	Montehermoso	Municipal
Moralo	Navalmoral de la Mata	Municipal
Olivenza	Olivenza	Municipal
Racing Valverdeño	Valverde de Leganés	San Roque
Trujillo	Trujillo	Julián García de Guadiana
Villafranca	Villafranca de los Barros	Municipal

==== League table ====
Pos	Team	Pld	W	D	L	GF	GA	GD	Pts	Qualification
1	Don Benito (C, P)	34	23	7	4	71	13	+58	76	Promotion to Segunda Federación and qualification for Copa del Rey
2	Coria (P)	34	19	12	3	58	20	+38	69	Qualification for the promotion playoffs and Copa del Rey
3	Azuaga	34	17	11	6	48	31	+17	62	Qualification for the promotion playoffs
4	Villafranca	34	15	10	9	45	26	+19	55	Qualification for the promotion playoffs
5	Moralo	34	15	8	11	55	44	+11	53	Qualification for the promotion playoffs
6	Castuera	34	15	7	12	49	37	+12	52	
7	Diocesano	34	14	7	13	50	46	+4	49	
8	Jaraíz	34	14	4	16	51	52	−1	46	
9	Atlético Pueblonuevo	34	12	7	15	35	45	−10	43	
10	Calamonte	34	9	15	10	40	52	−12	42 (Note: Calamonte finished ahead of Jerez on head-to-head points: Calamonte 2–1 Jerez, Jerez 0–0 Calamonte)	
11	Jerez	34	11	9	14	41	52	−11	42	
12	Olivenza	34	10	11	13	32	41	−9	41 (Note: Olivenza finished ahead of Arroyo on head-to-head points: Olivenza 2–2 Arroyo, Arroyo 0–2 Olivenza)	
13	Arroyo	34	10	11	13	33	39	−6	41	
14	Trujillo	34	8	14	12	30	38	−8	38	
15	Don Álvaro (R)	34	7	11	16	30	50	−20	32 (Note: Head-to-head points: Don Álvaro 7 pts, Racing Valverdeño 6 pts, Montehermoso 4 pts)	Relegation to Regional Preferente
16	Racing Valverdeño (R)	34	8	8	18	37	58	−21	32	Relegation to Regional Preferente
17	Montehermoso (R)	34	7	11	16	33	63	−30	32	Relegation to Regional Preferente
18	Fuente de Cantos (R)	34	4	13	17	28	59	−31	25	Relegation to Regional Preferente

Updated to match(es) played on 12 May 2024. Source:
Rules for classification: 1) points; 2) head-to-head points; 3) head-to-head goal difference; 4) goal difference; 5) number of goals scored
(C) Champions; (P) Promoted; (R) Relegated

=== Group 15 – Navarre ===
Teams retained from 2022–23 Tercera Federación

- Alesves
- Ardoi
- Avance
- Beti Onak
- Burladés
- Cantolagua
- Cortes
- Huarte
- Lagunak
- Oberena
- Pamplona
- Peña Sport
- Subiza
- Txantrea
Location of teams of the 2023–24 Tercera Federación Group 15

Teams relegated from 2022–23 Segunda Federación

- Cirbonero

Teams promoted from 2022–23 Primera Autonómica

- Beti Kozkor
- Bidezarra
- Lerinés

==== Teams and locations ====
Team	City	Home ground
Alesves	Villafranca	El Palomar
Ardoi	Zizur Mayor	El Pinar
Avance	Ezcabarte	Igueldea
Beti Kozkor	Lekunberri	Plazaola
Beti Onak	Villava	Lorenzo Goikoa
Bidezarra	Noáin	Municipal El Soto
Burladés	Burlada	Ripagaina
Cantolagua	Sangüesa	Cantolagua
Cirbonero	Cintruénigo	San Juan
Cortes	Cortes	San Francisco Javier
Huarte	Huarte/Uharte	Areta
Lagunak	Barañain	Sociedad Lagunak
Lerinés	Lerín	La Romaleta
Oberena	Pamplona	Oberena
Pamplona	Pamplona	Bidezarra
Peña Sport	Tafalla	San Francisco
Subiza	Subiza	Sotoburu
Txantrea	Pamplona	Txantrea

==== League table ====
Pos	Team	Pld	W	D	L	GF	GA	GD	Pts	Qualification
1	Subiza (C, P)	34	20	8	6	68	29	+39	68	Promotion to Segunda Federación
2	Cortes	34	17	12	5	40	23	+17	63	Qualification for the promotion playoffs and Copa del Rey
3	Ardoi	34	18	8	8	49	23	+26	62	Qualification for the promotion playoffs
4	Peña Sport	34	14	15	5	53	39	+14	57	Qualification for the promotion playoffs
5	Huarte	34	16	6	12	51	47	+4	54 (Note: Huarte finished ahead of Cantolagua on head-to-head points: Huarte 3–1 Cantolagua, Cantolagua 1–4 Huarte)	Qualification for the promotion playoffs
6	Cantolagua	34	15	9	10	55	45	+10	54	
7	Beti Onak	34	15	5	14	47	50	−3	50	
8	Cirbonero	34	12	8	14	46	49	−3	44	
9	Txantrea	34	11	9	14	34	36	−2	42 (Note: Head-to-head points: Txantrea 14 pts, Pamplona 9 pts, Beti Kozkor 5 pts, Bidezarra 3 pts)	
10	Pamplona	34	10	12	12	45	45	0	42	
11	Beti Kozkor	34	11	9	14	35	43	−8	42	
12	Bidezarra	34	9	15	10	42	38	+4	42	
13	Burladés	34	11	8	15	35	47	−12	41	
14	Oberena (R)	34	11	7	16	43	49	−6	40 (Note: Oberena finished ahead of Avance on head-to-head points: Avance 1–2 Oberena, Oberena 3–0 Avance)	Relegation to Primera Autonómica
15	Avance (R)	34	10	10	14	42	51	−9	40	Relegation to Primera Autonómica
16	Lagunak (R)	34	8	10	16	35	52	−17	34	Relegation to Primera Autonómica
17	Lerinés (R)	34	9	7	18	34	59	−25	34	Relegation to Primera Autonómica
18	Alesves (R)	34	7	6	21	34	63	−29	27	Relegation to Primera Autonómica

Updated to match(es) played on 11 May 2024. Source:
Rules for classification: 1) points; 2) head-to-head points; 3) head-to-head goal difference; 4) goal difference; 5) number of goals scored
(C) Champions; (P) Promoted; (R) Relegated

=== Group 16 – La Rioja ===
Teams retained from 2022–23 Tercera Federación

- Anguiano
- Atlético Vianés
- Berceo
- Calahorra B
- Casalarreina
- Comillas
- Haro
- La Calzada
- Oyonesa
- Peña Balsamaiso
- River Ebro
- Varea

Teams relegated from 2022–23 Segunda Federación

- Alfaro
- Arnedo
- Logroñés Promesas
- Racing Rioja

Teams promoted from 2022–23 Regional Preferente

- Alberite
- Tedeón

==== Teams and locations ====
Location of teams of the 2023–24 Tercera Federación Group 16

Team	City	Home ground
Alberite	Alberite	Mariano Sáenz Andollo
Alfaro	Alfaro	La Molineta
Anguiano	Anguiano	Isla
Arnedo	Arnedo	Sendero
Atlético Vianés	Viana (Navarre)	Municipal
Berceo	Logroño	La Isla
Calahorra B	Calahorra	La Planilla
Casalarreina	Casalarreina	El Soto
Comillas	Logroño	Mundial 82
Haro	Haro	El Mazo
La Calzada	Santo Domingo de La Calzada	El Rollo
Logroñés Promesas	Logroño	Mundial 82
Oyonesa	Oyón (Basque Country)	El Espinar
Peña Balsamaiso	Logroño	La Estrella
Racing Rioja	Logroño	El Salvador
River Ebro	Rincón de Soto	San Miguel
Tedeón	Navarrete	San Miguel
Varea	Varea, Logroño	Municipal

==== League table ====
Pos	Team	Pld	W	D	L	GF	GA	GD	Pts	Qualification
1	UD Logroñés B (Note: Because UD Logroñés did not win the 2024 Segunda Federación play-offs, Alfaro was promoted instead of UD Logroñés B) (C)	34	23	7	4	67	19	+48	76 (Note: UD Logroñés B finished ahead of Alfaro on overall goal difference)	Promotion to 2023–24 Segunda Federación
2	Alfaro (P)	34	23	7	4	80	36	+44	76	Qualification for the promotion playoffs and Copa del Rey
3	Calahorra B (Note: Calahorra B is ineligible for promotion, as their parent club, Calahorra, will participate in the 2024–25 Segunda Federación)	34	20	7	7	70	34	+36	67	
4	Anguiano (P)	34	19	8	7	69	41	+28	65	Qualification for the promotion playoffs
5	Varea	34	18	7	9	59	31	+28	61	Qualification for the promotion playoffs
6	Oyonesa	34	17	7	10	46	28	+18	58	Qualification for the promotion playoffs
7	Casalarreina	34	15	10	9	57	49	+8	55	
8	La Calzada	34	13	9	12	52	43	+9	48	
9	Berceo	34	13	8	13	43	44	−1	47	
10	Arnedo	34	11	9	14	36	48	−12	42 (Note: Arnedo finished ahead of Peña Balsamaiso on head-to-head points: Arnedo 1–0 Peña Balsamaiso, Peña Balsamaiso 0–0 Arnedo)	
11	Peña Balsamaiso	34	12	6	16	51	62	−11	42	
12	Racing Rioja (Note: UD Logroñés B awarded a 0–3 win in their Round 34 match against Racing Rioja after the latter did not take the pitch for the second half.) (D)	34	11	6	17	37	55	−18	39	
13	River Ebro	34	10	8	16	40	50	−10	38	
14	Atlético Vianés	34	9	6	19	30	62	−32	33	
15	Haro	34	8	7	19	38	50	−12	31	
16	Tedeón	34	8	6	20	25	61	−36	30	
17	Comillas (Note: Comillas retained their spot in Tercera Federación after Racing Rioja disappeared due to outstanding debts.)	34	3	15	16	38	59	−21	24	
18	Alberite (R)	34	4	5	25	37	103	−66	17	Relegation to Regional Preferente

Updated to match(es) played on 12 May 2024. Source:
Rules for classification: 1) points; 2) head-to-head points; 3) head-to-head goal difference; 4) goal difference; 5) number of goals scored
(C) Champions; (D) Disqualified; (P) Promoted; (R) Relegated

=== Group 17 – Aragon ===
Teams retained from 2022–23 Tercera Federación

- Almudévar
- Atlético Monzón
- Binéfar
- Calamocha
- Cariñena
- Caspe
- Cuarte
- Ejea
- Épila
- Huesca B
- Illueca
- Tamarite
- Utrillas

Teams relegated from 2022–23 Segunda Federación

- Ebro
Location of teams of the 2023–24 Tercera Federación Group 17

Teams promoted from 2022–23 Regional Preferente

- Belchite 97
- Borja
- Fraga
- Fuentes

==== Teams and locations ====
Team	City	Home ground
Almudévar	Almudévar	La Corona
Atlético Monzón	Monzón	Isidro Calderón
Belchite 97	Belchite	Municipal
Binéfar	Binéfar	Los Olmos
Borja	Borja	Manuel Meler
Calamocha	Calamocha	Jumaya
Cariñena	Cariñena	La Platera
Caspe	Caspe	Los Rosales
Cuarte	Cuarte de Huerva	Nuevo Municipal
Ebro	Zaragoza	El Carmen
Ejea	Ejea de los Caballeros	Luchán
Épila	Épila	La Huerta
Fraga	Fraga	La Estacada
Fuentes	Fuentes de Ebro	San Miguel
Huesca B	Huesca	San Jorge
Illueca	Illueca	Papa Luna
Tamarite	Tamarite de Litera	La Colomina
Utrillas	Utrillas	La Vega

==== League table ====
Pos	Team	Pld	W	D	L	GF	GA	GD	Pts	Qualification
1	Ejea (C, P)	34	19	10	5	52	27	+25	67	Promotion to Segunda Federación and qualification for Copa del Rey
2	Cuarte	34	18	11	5	48	22	+26	65	Qualification for the promotion playoffs and Copa del Rey
3	Ebro	34	18	9	7	48	24	+24	63	Qualification for the promotion playoffs
4	Épila	34	16	11	7	49	31	+18	59 (Note: Épila finished ahead of Caspe on overall goal difference)	Qualification for the promotion playoffs
5	Caspe	34	16	11	7	42	34	+8	59	Qualification for the promotion playoffs
6	Almudévar	34	15	10	9	40	30	+10	55	
7	Atlético Monzón	34	14	9	11	29	23	+6	51	
8	Calamocha	34	14	7	13	39	33	+6	49	
9	Fraga	34	13	9	12	49	40	+9	48	
10	Utrillas	34	12	11	11	42	43	−1	47 (Note: Utrillas finished ahead of Huesca B on head-to-head goal difference: Huesca B 2–1 Utrillas, Utrillas 2–0 Huesca B)	
11	Huesca B	34	12	11	11	43	38	+5	47	
12	Tamarite	34	11	10	13	52	53	−1	43	
13	Binéfar	34	9	11	14	36	50	−14	38	
14	Fuentes	34	7	13	14	33	47	−14	34	
15	Belchite 97	34	7	12	15	35	49	−14	33	
16	Illueca (R)	34	5	12	17	26	54	−28	27	Relegation to Regional Preferente
17	Borja (R)	34	5	7	22	16	44	−28	22	Relegation to Regional Preferente
18	Cariñena (R)	34	4	8	22	34	71	−37	20	Relegation to Regional Preferente

Updated to match(es) played on 12 May 2024. Source:
Rules for classification: 1) points; 2) head-to-head points; 3) head-to-head goal difference; 4) goal difference; 5) number of goals scored
(C) Champions; (P) Promoted; (R) Relegated

=== Group 18 – Castilla–La Mancha ===
Teams retained from 2022–23 Tercera Federación

- Azuqueca
- Atlético Tomelloso
- Calvo Sotelo Puertollano
- Conquense
- La Solana
- Marchamalo
- Quintanar del Rey
- Tarancón
- Toledo
- Torrijos
- Villacañas
- Villarrobledo
- Villarrubia

Teams relegated from 2022–23 Segunda Federación

- Socuéllamos

Teams promoted from 2022–23 Primera Autonómica Preferente

- Atlético Albacete
- Cazalegas
- Huracán Balazote
- San Clemente

==== Teams and locations ====
Location of teams of the 2023–24 Tercera Federación Group 18

Team	City	Home ground
Atlético Albacete	Albacete	Andrés Iniesta
Atlético Tomelloso	Tomelloso	Paco Gálvez
Azuqueca	Azuqueca de Henares	San Miguel
Calvo Sotelo	Puertollano	Ciudad de Puertollano
Cazalegas	Cazalegas	Ciudad Deportiva Ébora Formación
Conquense	Cuenca	La Fuensanta
Huracán Balazote	Balazote	Municipal de Barrax
La Solana	La Solana	La Moheda
Marchamalo	Marchamalo	La Solana
Quintanar del Rey	Quintanar del Rey	San Marcos
San Clemente	San Clemente	Municipal
Socuéllamos	Socuéllamos	Paquito Jiménez
Tarancón	Tarancón	Municipal
Toledo	Toledo	Salto del Caballo
Torrijos	Torrijos	San Francisco
Villacañas	Villacañas	Las Pirámides
Villarrobledo	Villarrobledo	Nuestra Señora de la Caridad
Villarrubia	Villarrubia de los Ojos	Nuevo Municipal

==== League table ====
Pos	Team	Pld	W	D	L	GF	GA	GD	Pts	Qualification
1	Conquense (C, P)	34	21	10	3	57	18	+39	73	Promotion to Segunda Federación and qualification for Copa del Rey
2	Cazalegas	34	17	8	9	48	35	+13	59	Qualification for the promotion playoffs
3	Toledo	34	16	10	8	47	25	+22	58 (Note: Toledo finished ahead of Socuéllamos on overall goal difference)	Qualification for the promotion playoffs
4	Socuéllamos	34	15	13	6	48	28	+20	58	Qualification for the promotion playoffs
5	Quintanar del Rey	34	16	9	9	46	29	+17	57	Qualification for the promotion playoffs
6	Calvo Sotelo	34	15	11	8	48	33	+15	56	
7	Villarrubia	34	15	10	9	36	31	+5	55	
8	Tarancón	34	11	14	9	38	31	+7	47	
9	Atlético Albacete	34	12	10	12	47	49	−2	46	
10	Azuqueca	34	10	11	13	40	46	−6	41 (Note: Head-to-head points: Azuqueca 8 pts, Villacañas 5 pts, Villarrobledo 2 pts)	
11	Villacañas	34	10	11	13	34	36	−2	41	
12	Villarrobledo	34	10	11	13	28	37	−9	41	
13	Marchamalo	34	10	9	15	27	38	−11	39 (Note: Head-to-head points: Marchamalo 9 pts, Huracán Balazote 9 pts, La Solana 0 pts. Marchamalo finished ahead of Huracán Balazote on overall goal difference)	
14	Huracán Balazote	34	8	15	11	35	47	−12	39	
15	La Solana (R)	34	10	9	15	34	39	−5	39	Relegation to Primera Autonómica Preferente
16	Torrijos (R)	34	5	13	16	23	45	−22	28	Relegation to Primera Autonómica Preferente
17	Atlético Tomelloso (R)	34	5	11	18	24	55	−31	26	Relegation to Primera Autonómica Preferente
18	San Clemente (R)	34	4	7	23	28	66	−38	19	Relegation to Primera Autonómica Preferente

Updated to match(es) played on 12 May 2024. Source:
Rules for classification: 1) points; 2) head-to-head points; 3) head-to-head goal difference; 4) goal difference; 5) number of goals scored
(C) Champions; (P) Promoted; (R) Relegated

== Qualification for Copa del Rey ==
In addition to the 18 best-placed non-reserve teams qualifying for the 2024–25 Copa del Rey, the seven best non-reserve runners-up of the 18 groups that have not already qualified will also participate.

Pos	Grp	Team	Pld	W	D	L	GF	GA	GD	Pts	Qualification or relegation
1	8	Salamanca (Q)	34	21	10	3	62	16	+46	73	Qualification for Copa del Rey
2	9	Jaén (Q)	34	22	7	5	66	28	+38	73	Qualification for Copa del Rey
3	14	Coria (Q)	34	19	12	3	58	20	+38	69	Qualification for Copa del Rey
4	5	L'Hospitalet (Q)	34	22	3	9	56	28	+28	69	Qualification for Copa del Rey
5	10	Ciudad de Lucena (Q)	34	19	9	6	39	21	+18	66	Qualification for Copa del Rey
6	17	Cuarte (Q)	34	18	11	5	48	22	+26	65	Qualification for Copa del Rey
7	3	Laredo (Q)	34	18	7	9	49	22	+27	61	Qualification for Copa del Rey
8	18	Cazalegas	34	17	8	9	48	35	+13	59	
9	16	Alfaro (Q)	34	23	7	4	80	36	+44	76	Second-place team already qualified
10	12	Lanzarote (Q)	34	22	9	3	63	28	+35	75	Second-place team already qualified
11	6	Jove Español (Q)	34	18	10	6	46	23	+23	64	Second-place team already qualified
12	7	Móstoles URJC (Q)	34	17	12	5	57	33	+24	63	Second-place team already qualified
13	15	Cortes (Q)	34	17	12	5	40	23	+17	63	Second-place team already qualified
14	4	Beasain (Q)	34	19	6	9	55	36	+19	63	Third-place team already qualified
15	11	Mallorca B	34	22	8	4	72	16	+56	74	Ineligible for Copa del Rey
16	2	Sporting Atlético	34	21	8	5	61	15	+46	71	Ineligible for Copa del Rey
17	13	Murcia Imperial	34	20	8	6	67	33	+34	68	Ineligible for Copa del Rey
18	1	Gran Peña	34	15	16	3	48	30	+18	61	Ineligible for Copa del Rey

Updated to match(es) played on 12 May 2024. Source:
Rules for classification: 1) points; 2) goal difference; 3) number of goals scored
(Q) Qualified for the phase indicated

== See also ==
- 2023–24 La Liga
- 2023–24 Segunda División
- 2023–24 Primera Federación
- 2023–24 Segunda Federación
