= Ontinyent 1931 CF =

Ontinyent
- Full name: Ontinyent 1931 Club de Futbol
- Nicknames: Blanquinegres, Ontinyentins
- Founded: 2019; 7 years ago
- Ground: El Clariano, Ontinyent, Valencian Country
- Capacity: 5,000
- President: Juanma Bas
- Head coach: Rubén Sanz
- League: Tercera Federación – Group 6
- 2025–26: Tercera Federación – Group 6, 8th of 18
- Website: ontinyent1931cf.com
Home colours	Away colours	Third colours

Ontinyent 1931 Club de Futbol is a Spanish football team based in Ontinyent, in the Valencian Country. Refounded in 2019 as the successor of Ontinyent CF, its first team plays in the Tercera Federación – Group 6, holding home matches at the Estadi El Clariano, with a capacity of 5,000 people. Moreover, the club has a second team and an under-19 team.

In its first four seasons, Ontinyent went up three times, achieving promotion to the Tercera Federación in 2023. Meanwhile, the club was able to maintain a high number of members in comparison to other teams in the same league, reaching 2,000 members at the lowest tier and never going below 1,000 members in other categories. Moreover, the club has committed to maintaining the democratic internal structure of the club, representing the city of Ontinyent, and defending the use of the Valencian language.

== Symbols ==
=== Hymn ===
The hymn of Ontinyent is called El Crit del Clariano ("The Shout of El Clariano") and was also the official hymn of the disappeared Ontinyent CF. After the birth of the current club, the rights over the hymn were given by its authors to the new club because it is considered a core part of the club's identity. The hymn was composed in 2003 by El Corredor Polonès, an alternative rock group from Ontinyent.

=== Crest ===
Since the refoundation of the club in 2019, Ontinyent has only had one crest. To obtain a representative logo, the club launched a campaign in which supporters could design one, so that a technical jury could select one afterwards. The winning design was number 38, designed by Gonzalo Vidal Vallés.

The badge has practically maintained the shape of the logo of Ontinyent CF. Within, the logo consists of an adaptation of the coat of arms of the city of Ontinyent, the club name and its colours (white and black). These parts are surrounded by a golden edge.

=== Uniform ===
First uniform: white shirt, black pants, and white socks

Second uniform: black shirt, black pants, and black socks

Third uniform: blue shirt, blue pants, and blue socks

The uniform of Ontinyent is highly similar to the one of its predecessor, given that this element is regarded as a vital part of the identity of the club. Between 2019 and 2021, the rules of the Valencian Football Federation prohibited the use of the same uniform as its predecessor.

== History ==
=== Name evolution ===
- Ontinyent 1931 Club de Futbol (2019-present)

=== Refoundation of Ontinyent (2019) ===
After a severe financial and institutional crisis in 2019, Ontinyent CF disappeared. The club had been the representative club of the city of Ontinyent between 1947 and 2019 and participated in five editions of the Segunda División during the 1960s and 1970s, becoming one of the most historic Valencian football clubs to have never participated in the Primera División.

The project of the refoundation of the club was realised by ex-players of Ontinyent CF, with the support of the fanbase of the previous club. On May 31, 2019, the Valencian Football Federation authorized the inscription of the club in the Register of Sports Entities and was presented on July 13 of the same year.

=== First years. From the Segunda Regional to the Tercera Federación ===
Ontinyent had to start competing in the lowest category of the Valencian Country, the Segunda Regional. The club won the league in a season affected by the COVID-19 pandemic, going up to the Primera Regional. The next season, Ontinyent won another title and promotion, this time to the Regional Preferente.

The 2021-22 season would be the first one without a promotion. Nevertheless, Ontinyent won many matches in the Regional Preferente, but finally finished in fourth place. In the 2022-23 season, the club assured the first place with many matchdays to go and was the club with the most points across all groups of the category. In the Regional Preferente play-off, Ontinyent lost to CF Recambios Colón (3-0 in Catarroja and 2-1 in Ontinyent). After the season's end, the club ended up achieving promotion to the Tercera Federación due to a restructuring of Valencian football.

The 2023-24 season was the debut season at a national level, and Ontinyent finished in third place, qualifying for the Tercera Federación play-off. In the semi-final, the club was eliminated by Atzeneta UE in a match between the most potent teams of the Vall d'Albaida (1-1 in Atzeneta d'Albaida and 0-1 in Ontinyent).

== Season to season ==
Season	Tier	Division	Place	Copa del Rey
2019–20	7	2ª Reg.	1st	
2020–21	6	1ª Reg.	1st	
2021–22	6	Reg. Pref.	4th	
2022–23	6	Reg. Pref.	1st	
2023–24	5	3ª Fed.	3rd	
2024–25	5	3ª Fed.	11th	
2025–26	5	3ª Fed.	8th	
2026–27	5	3ª Fed.		

- 4 seasons in the Tercera Federación
- 4 seasons in regional competitions

== Honours ==
=== Regional competitions ===
- Regional Preferente (1): 2022-23
- Primera Regional (1): 2020-21
- Segunda Regional (1): 2019-20

== Presidents ==
Since its refoundation, Ontinyent has had two presidents.

- Miguel Ángel Mullor Domènech (2019-2023)
- Juanma Bas Tortosa (2023–present)

== Coaches ==
Since its refoundation, Ontinyent has had one coach.

- Roberto Bas Belda (2019–present)

== Other teams ==
In 2023-24, Ontinyent disposes of a second team and a team under-19. Moreover, it has a collaboration with Clariano CF and CD Esport Base Ontinyent. In 2024, the club expressed its intention to unify the three entities into one sole club before the start of the 2024-25 season.

== Stadium ==
Ontinyent plays its home matches at the Estadi El Clariano, the main football stadium in Ontinyent. It was inaugurated on January 10, 1951 in a match against Valencia CF (2-9 in favor of the visitors). El Clariano has a capacity for 5,000 spectators, has dimensions of 103x68 meters, and has artificial grass.

== Supporter groups and fanbase ==
As of 2024, Ontinyent has three penyes (official supporter groups): els Incondicionals 1931, the Peña la Torreta, and the Frente Botifarra. Moreover, the club has more than 1,000 members.

== See also ==
- Ontinyent CF

== Bibliography ==
- Reig Pla, Arturo (2018). Ontinyent CF. Una historia apasionante [Ontinyent CF. An exciting history] (in Spanish). Ontinyent: TXTO Editorial, with the collaboration of the Municipality of Ontinyent and the Provincial Council of València. ISBN 978-84-947306-4-1. DL V 727-2018.
