= CA Victoria =

Spanish football club

Atlético Victoria
- Full name: Club Atlético Victoria
- Founded: 1991
- Ground: Municipal, La Victoria de Acentejo, Tenerife, Canary Islands, Spain
- Capacity: 1,000
- President: José Luis Bello
- Manager: Jonathan Yanes
- League: Interinsular Preferente
- 2024–25: Interinsular Preferente, 9th of 21
| Home colours | Away colours |

Club Atlético Victoria is a Spanish football team based in La Victoria de Acentejo, in the autonomous community of Canary Islands. Founded in 1991, it plays in Interinsular Preferente, holding home matches at Campo Municipal de la Victoria de Acentejo, with a capacity of 1,000 people.

== History ==
Founded in 1991, Atlético Victoria started a senior team five years later, and achieved a first-ever promotion to Tercera División in 2011. Relegated in 2015, the club only returned to the category in 2020.

Immediately relegated back in 2021, Atlético Victoria returned to a national division in June 2023, now in the fifth-tier Tercera Federación.

== Season to season ==
| Season | Tier | Division | Place | Copa del Rey |
|---|---|---|---|---|
| 1996–97 | 7 | 2ª Int. | 14th | |
| 1997–98 | 7 | 2ª Int. | 5th | |
| 1998–99 | 7 | 2ª Int. | 7th | |
| 1999–2000 | 7 | 2ª Int. | 8th | |
| 2000–01 | 7 | 2ª Int. | 7th | |
| 2001–02 | 7 | 2ª Int. | 6th | |
| 2002–03 | 7 | 2ª Int. | 6th | |
| 2003–04 | 7 | 2ª Int. | 1st | |
| 2004–05 | 6 | 1ª Int. | 1st | |
| 2005–06 | 6 | 1ª Int. | 2nd | |
| 2006–07 | 5 | Int. Pref. | 16th | |
| 2007–08 | 5 | Int. Pref. | 9th | |
| 2008–09 | 5 | Int. Pref. | 7th | |
| 2009–10 | 5 | Int. Pref. | 5th | |
| 2010–11 | 5 | Int. Pref. | 1st | |
| 2011–12 | 4 | 3ª | 15th | |
| 2012–13 | 4 | 3ª | 15th | |
| 2013–14 | 4 | 3ª | 7th | |
| 2014–15 | 4 | 3ª | 20th | |
| 2015–16 | 5 | Int. Pref. | 16th | |

| Season | Tier | Division | Place | Copa del Rey |
|---|---|---|---|---|
| 2016–17 | 6 | 1ª Int. | 1st | |
| 2017–18 | 5 | Int. Pref. | 4th | |
| 2018–19 | 5 | Int. Pref. | 2nd | |
| 2019–20 | 5 | Int. Pref. | 2nd | |
| 2020–21 | 4 | 3ª | 9th / 7th | |
| 2021–22 | 6 | Int. Pref. | 1st | |
| 2022–23 | 6 | Int. Pref. | 1st | |
| 2023–24 | 5 | 3ª Fed. | 15th | |
| 2024–25 | 6 | Int. Pref. | 9th | |
| 2025–26 | 6 | Int. Pref. | | |

- 5 seasons in Tercera División
- 1 season in Tercera Federación
