= AD Lorquí =

Association football club in Spain

Lorquí
- Full name: Asociación Deportiva Lorquí
- Founded: 2007 (as AD Monteagudo)
- Ground: Juan de la Cierva, Lorquí, Murcia, Spain
- Capacity: 1,600
- President: Hugo Peñaloza
- Manager: Micha
- League: Preferente Autonómica
- 2024–25: Preferente Autonómica, 8th of 18
Home colours	Away colours

Asociación Deportiva Lorquí is a football team based in Lorquí, in the Region of Murcia. Founded in 2007, they play in Preferente Autonómica, holding home matches at the Polideportivo Municipal Juan de la Cierva.

AD Lorquí is the senior team of ADM Lorquí.

== History ==
Club logo used in the 2023–24 season

Founded in 2007 as Asociación Deportiva Monteagudo, the club was initially based in Monteagudo before changing name to Montecasillas Fútbol Club in 2009, also moving to Casillas. In March 2023, the club achieved a first-ever promotion to Tercera Federación.

Immediately relegated back to the regional leagues, Montecasillas reached an agreement with ADM Lorquí to move to Lorquí, also changing name to Asociación Deportiva Lorquí.

=== Club background ===
- Asociación Deportiva Monteagudo (2007–2009)
- Montecasillas Fútbol Club (2009–2013; 2015–2018; 2021–2024)
- DITT Redmovil Montecasillas Fútbol Club (2013–2014)
- Redmovil UCAM Montecasillas Fútbol Club (2014–2015)
- Montecasillas Fútbol Club Progreso (2018–2019)
- Montecasillas Fútbol Club Crédito y Caución (2019–2021)
- Asociación Deportiva Lorquí (2024–)

== Season to season ==
Season	Tier	Division	Place	Copa del Rey
2007–08	6	1ª Terr.	12th	
2008–09	6	Liga Aut.	2nd	
2009–10	5	Terr. Pref.	10th	
2010–11	5	Pref. Aut.	17th	
2011–12	5	Pref. Aut.	13th	
2012–13	5	Pref. Aut.	12th	
2013–14	5	Pref. Aut.	7th	
2014–15	5	Pref. Aut.	7th	
2015–16	5	Pref. Aut.	9th	
2016–17	5	Pref. Aut.	17th	
2017–18	6	1ª Aut.	4th	
2018–19	5	Pref. Aut.	17th	
2019–20	6	1ª Aut.	12th	
2020–21	6	1ª Aut.	4th	
2021–22	6	Pref. Aut.	7th	
2022–23	6	Pref. Aut.	2nd	
2023–24	5	3ª Fed.	18th	
2024–25	6	Pref. Aut.	8th	
2025–26	6	Pref. Aut.		

- 1 season in Tercera Federación
