= UD Torre del Mar =

Association football club in Spain

Torre del Mar
- Full name: Unión Deportiva Torre del Mar
- Founded: 1971
- Ground: Juan Manuel Azuaga; Torre del Mar, Vélez-Málaga, Spain
- Capacity: 2,000
- Chairman: Francisco Ocampo
- Manager: Alfonso Vera
- League: Tercera Federación – Group 9
- 2025–26: Tercera Federación – Group 9, 3rd of 18
Home colours	Away colours

Unión Deportiva Torre del Mar is a Spanish football team based in Torre del Mar, Vélez-Málaga, in the autonomous community of Andalusia. Founded in 1971, it currently plays in Tercera Federación – Group 9, holding home matches at Estadio Juan Manuel Azuaga, with a 2,000-seat capacity.

== History ==
Founded in 1971 as Club Deportivo Torre del Mar, the club was renamed to Unión Deportiva Torre del Mar in 1974. After playing several years in the Regional Preferente, the club went into inactivity in 2014, only returning one year later.

After being inactive again in 2016, Torre del Mar returned to action in 2017 under the name of Torre del Mar Fútbol Club, and immediately achieved promotion from the Tercera Andaluza. The club moved back to their previous name, and achieved another three consecutive promotions to reach a national division for the first time in their history.

== Season to season ==
Season	Tier	Division	Place	Copa del Rey
1971–72	6	2ª Reg.	14th	
1972–73	6	2ª Reg.		
1973–74	6	2ª Reg.		
1974–75	6	2ª Reg.		
1975–76	6	2ª Reg.	9th	
1976–77	6	2ª Reg.	18th	
1977–78	7	2ª Reg.	1st	
1978–79	7	2ª Reg.	6th	
1979–80	7	2ª Reg.	1st	
1980–81	6	1ª Reg.	8th	
1981–82	5	Reg. Pref.	11th	
1982–83	5	Reg. Pref.	18th	
1983–84	5	Reg. Pref.	10th	
1984–85	5	Reg. Pref.	13th	
1985–86	5	Reg. Pref.	19th	
1986–87	5	Reg. Pref.	12th	
1987–88	5	Reg. Pref.	8th	
1988–89	5	Reg. Pref.	10th	
1989–90	5	Reg. Pref.	15th	
1990–91	5	Reg. Pref.	7th	

Season	Tier	Division	Place	Copa del Rey
1991–92	5	Reg. Pref.	15th	
1992–93	6	1ª Reg.	3rd	
1993–94	5	Reg. Pref.	18th	
1994–95	6	1ª Reg.		
1995–96	5	Reg. Pref.	17th	
1996–97	6	1ª Reg.		
1997–98	5	Reg. Pref.	8th	
1998–99	5	Reg. Pref.	6th	
1999–2000	5	Reg. Pref.	5th	
2000–01	5	Reg. Pref.	2nd	
2001–02	5	Reg. Pref.	10th	
2002–03	5	Reg. Pref.	5th	
2003–04	5	Reg. Pref.	8th	
2004–05	6	Reg. Pref.	2nd	
2005–06	5	1ª And.	13th	
2006–07	6	Reg. Pref.	1st	
2007–08	5	1ª And.	16th	
2008–09	5	1ª And.	16th	
2009–10	6	Reg. Pref.	4th	
2010–11	5	1ª And.	18th	

Season	Tier	Division	Place	Copa del Rey
2011–12	6	Reg. Pref.	14th	
2012–13	6	Reg. Pref.	9th	
2013–14	6	Reg. Pref.	18th	
2014–15	DNP			
2015–16	8	3ª And.	12th	
2016–17	DNP			
2017–18	8	3ª And.	1st	
2018–19	7	2ª And.	3rd	
2019–20	6	1ª And.	1st	
2020–21	5	Div. Hon.	1st	
2021–22	5	3ª RFEF	8th	
2022–23	5	3ª Fed.	4th	
2023–24	5	3ª Fed.	5th	
2024–25	5	3ª Fed.	4th	
2025–26	5	3ª Fed.	3rd	
2026–27	5	3ª Fed.		

- 6 seasons in Tercera Federación/Tercera División RFEF
