= CF Panadería Pulido =

Spanish association football club

Panadería Pulido
- Full name: Club de Fútbol Panadería Pulido San Mateo
- Founded: 1993
- Ground: San Mateo, Vega de San Mateo, Gran Canaria, Canary Islands, Spain
- Capacity: 3,000
- Chairman: Armando Santana
- Manager: Juan Carlos Socorro
- League: Tercera Federación – Group 12
- 2025–26: Tercera Federación – Group 12, 5th of 18
Home colours	Away colours

Club de Fútbol Panadería Pulido San Mateo is a football team based in Vega de San Mateo, Gran Canaria, Canary Islands. Founded in 1993, the team plays in Tercera Federación – Group 12, holding home matches at Campo de Fútbol San Mateo.

== History ==
Founded in 1993 as a football side from a bakery, the club spent the most of their seasons in the regional leagues. In 2016, after finishing second of their group in the Preferente, they achieved promotion to Tercera División.

In June 2021, the club was one of the 54 teams promoted to the newly formed Segunda División RFEF.

== Season to season ==
Season	Tier	Division	Place	Copa del Rey
1993–94	7	2ª Reg.	17th	
1994–95	7	2ª Reg.	18th	
1995–96	7	2ª Reg.	7th	
1996–97	7	2ª Reg.	4th	
1997–98	7	2ª Reg.	4th	
1998–99	7	2ª Reg.	7th	
1999–2000	7	2ª Reg.	1st	
2000–01	6	1ª Reg.	17th	
2001–02	7	2ª Reg.	1st	
2002–03	6	1ª Reg.	14th	
2003–04	6	1ª Reg.	13th	
2004–05	6	1ª Reg.	9th	
2005–06	6	1ª Reg.	18th	
2006–07	7	2ª Reg.	11th	
2007–08	7	2ª Reg.	4th	
2008–09	7	2ª Reg.	1st	
2009–10	6	1ª Reg.	13th	
2010–11	6	1ª Reg.	8th	
2011–12	6	1ª Reg.	6th	
2012–13	6	1ª Reg.	7th	

Season	Tier	Division	Place	Copa del Rey
2013–14	6	1ª Reg.	1st	
2014–15	5	Int. Pref.	5th	
2015–16	5	Int. Pref.	1st	
2016–17	4	3ª	8th	
2017–18	4	3ª	12th	
2018–19	4	3ª	17th	
2019–20	4	3ª	8th	
2020–21	4	3ª	2nd	
2021–22	4	2ª RFEF	17th	
2022–23	5	3ª Fed.	7th	
2023–24	5	3ª Fed.	5th	
2024–25	5	3ª Fed.	7th	
2025–26	5	3ª Fed.	5th	
2026–27	5	3ª Fed.		

- 1 season in Segunda División RFEF
- 5 seasons in Tercera División
- 5 seasons in Tercera Federación
