= CD Azuaga =

Association football club

Azuaga
- Full name: Club Deportivo Azuaga
- Founded: 1972; 54 years ago
- Stadium: Estadio Municipal de Deportes de Azuaga
- Capacity: 1,500
- President: David Blanco Chicote
- Head coach: Cisqui
- League: Tercera Federación – Group 14
- 2025–26: Tercera Federación – Group 14, 4th of 18
Home colours	Away colours

Club Deportivo Azuaga is a Spanish football team based in Azuaga, in the autonomous community of Extremadura. Founded in 1972, it currently plays in Tercera Federación – Group 14, holding home games at Estadio Municipal de Deportes, which has a capacity of 1,500.

== History ==
The football history of Azuaga dates back to 1917, when the Racing Club Arsense de Azuaga was created, being the fourth city in Extremadura to create a football team after Badajoz, Cáceres and Mérida. In 2018–19 season, the club finished 8th in Tercera División, Group 14 with 14 wins, 9 draws and 15 losses in the 38 league games.

== Honours ==
- Extremadura Championship
  - Runners-up (1): 1935–36

== Season to season ==
Season	Tier	Division	Place	Copa del Rey
1974–75	5	1ª Reg.	1st	
1975–76	5	1ª Reg.	2nd	
1976–77	4	Reg. Pref.	12th	
1977–78	5	Reg. Pref.	7th	
1978–79	5	Reg. Pref.	12th	
1979–80	5	Reg. Pref.	5th	
1980–81	5	Reg. Pref.	9th	
1981–82	5	Reg. Pref.	2nd	
1982–83	5	Reg. Pref.	6th	
1983–84	4	3ª	12th	
1984–85	4	3ª	14th	
1985–86	4	3ª	15th	
1986–87	4	3ª	18th	
1987–88	4	3ª	19th	
1988–89	5	Reg. Pref.	4th	
1989–90	5	Reg. Pref.	1st	
1990–91	4	3ª	8th	
1991–92	4	3ª	15th	
1992–93	4	3ª	15th	
1993–94	4	3ª	8th	

Season	Tier	Division	Place	Copa del Rey
1994–95	4	3ª	17th	
1995–96	4	3ª	20th	
1996–97	DNP			
1997–98	DNP			
1998–99	6	1ª Reg.	4th	
1999–2000	5	Reg. Pref.	10th	
2000–01	5	Reg. Pref.	20th	
2001–02	6	1ª Reg.	1st	
2002–03	5	Reg. Pref.	17th	
2003–04	5	Reg. Pref.	16th	
2004–05	DNP			
2005–06	DNP			
2006–07	DNP			
2007–08	6	1ª Reg.	15th	
2008–09	6	1ª Reg.	11th	
2009–10	6	1ª Reg.	2nd	
2010–11	5	Reg. Pref.	14th	
2011–12	5	Reg. Pref.	5th	
2012–13	5	Reg. Pref.	2nd	
2013–14	4	3ª	10th	

Season	Tier	Division	Place	Copa del Rey
2014–15	4	3ª	8th	
2015–16	4	3ª	6th	
2016–17	4	3ª	4th	
2017–18	4	3ª	14th	
2018–19	4	3ª	8th	
2019–20	4	3ª	11th	
2020–21	4	3ª	6th / 6th	
2021–22	5	3ª RFEF	7th	
2022–23	5	3ª Fed.	2nd	
2023–24	5	3ª Fed.	3rd	First round
2024–25	5	3ª Fed.	2nd	
2025–26	5	3ª Fed.	4th	First round
2026–27	5	3ª Fed.		

- 19 seasons in Tercera División
- 6 seasons in Tercera Federación/Tercera División RFEF
