= SD Torina =

Association football club in Spain

Torina
- Full name: Sociedad Deportiva Torina
- Founded: 1960
- Ground: Estadio Municipal Bárcena de Pie de Concha, Cantabria, Spain
- Capacity: 2,000
- President: Roberto Collantes Gonzalez
- Head coach: Hilario Vega
- League: Tercera Federación – Group 3
- 2025–26: Tercera Federación – Group 3, 9th of 18
- Website: http://www.sdtorina.es
Home colours

Sociedad Deportiva Torina is a Spanish football team located in Bárcena de Pie de Concha, in the autonomous community of Cantabria. Founded in 1960 it currently plays in Tercera Federación – Group 3, holding home matches at Estadio Municipal Bárcena de Pie de Concha with a capacity of 2,000 spectators.

== History ==
SD Torina was founded in 1960.

== Season to season ==
Season	Tier	Division	Place	Copa del Rey
1968–69	5	2ª Reg.	8th	
1969–70	5	2ª Reg.	2nd	
1970–71	5	2ª Reg.	9th	
1971–72	5	2ª Reg.	3rd	
1972–73	4	1ª Reg.	16th	
1973–74	5	2ª Reg.	15th	
1974–75	6	2ª Reg.	2nd	
1975–76	5	1ª Reg.	6th	
1976–77	5	1ª Reg.	13th	
1977–78	6	1ª Reg.	8th	
1978–79	6	1ª Reg.	4th	
1979–80	5	Reg. Pref.	15th	
1980–81	5	Reg. Pref.	14th	
1981–82	5	Reg. Pref.	20th	
1982–83	6	1ª Reg.	13th	
1983–84	6	1ª Reg.	10th	
1984–85	6	1ª Reg.	14th	
1985–86	6	1ª Reg.	8th	
1986–87	6	1ª Reg.	1st	
1987–88	5	Reg. Pref.	7th	

Season	Tier	Division	Place	Copa del Rey
1988–89	5	Reg. Pref.	19th	
1989–90	6	1ª Reg.	4th	
1990–91	6	1ª Reg.	3rd	
1991–92	5	Reg. Pref.	1st	
1992–93	4	3ª	13th	
1993–94	4	3ª	19th	
1994–95	5	Reg. Pref.	15th	
1995–96	5	Reg. Pref.	18th	
1996–97	6	1ª Reg.	1st	
1997–98	5	Reg. Pref.	17th	
1998–99	6	1ª Reg.	14th	
1999–2000	6	1ª Reg.	7th	
2000–01	6	1ª Reg.	6th	
2001–02	6	1ª Reg.	15th	
2002–03	6	1ª Reg.	12th	
2003–04	6	1ª Reg.	14th	
2004–05	6	1ª Reg.	14th	
2005–06	7	2ª Reg.	16th	
2006–07	7	2ª Reg.	10th	
2007–08	7	2ª Reg.	1st	

Season	Tier	Division	Place	Copa del Rey
2008–09	6	1ª Reg.	12th	
2009–10	6	1ª Reg.	5th	
2010–11	6	1ª Reg.	1st	
2011–12	5	Reg. Pref.	9th	
2012–13	5	Reg. Pref.	6th	
2013–14	5	Reg. Pref.	10th	
2014–15	5	Reg. Pref.	16th	
2015–16	6	1ª Reg.	4th	
2016–17	5	Reg. Pref.	7th	
2017–18	5	Reg. Pref.	2nd	
2018–19	4	3ª	9th	
2019–20	4	3ª	12th	
2020–21	4	3ª	8th / 3rd	
2021–22	5	3ª RFEF	5th	
2022–23	5	3ª Fed.	6th	
2023–24	5	3ª Fed.	3rd	
2024–25	5	3ª Fed.	8th	
2025–26	5	3ª Fed.	9th	
2026–27	5	3ª Fed.		

- 5 seasons in Tercera División
- 6 seasons in Tercera Federación/Tercera División RFEF
