= CD Bullense =

Spanish football club

Bullense
- Full name: Club Deportivo Bullense
- Founded: 1931
- Ground: Nicolás de las Peñas, Bullas, Region of Murcia, Spain
- Capacity: 2,000
- President: Antonio Jiménez "Gasero"
- Manager: Jorge González
- 2025–26: Preferente Autonómica, 17th of 18 (relegated)
| Home colours | Away colours |

Club Deportivo Bullense is a Spanish football team based in Bullas, in the autonomous community of Region of Murcia. Founded in 1931, they play in , holding home matches at the Estadio Nicolás de las Peñas, which has a capacity of 2,000 people.

== Season to season ==
| Season | Tier | Division | Place | Copa del Rey |
|---|---|---|---|---|
| 1943–44 | 5 | 2ª Reg. | 4th | |
| 1944–45 | 5 | 2ª Reg. | 2nd | |
| 1945–46 | DNP | | | |
| 1946–47 | 5 | 2ª Reg. | 4th | |
| 1947–1955 | DNP | | | |
| 1955–56 | 5 | 2ª Reg. | 9th | |
| 1956–57 | 5 | 2ª Reg. | 2nd | |
| 1957–58 | 5 | 2ª Reg. | 2nd | |
| 1958–1969 | DNP | | | |
| 1969–70 | 5 | 2ª Reg. | 12th | |
| 1970–71 | 5 | 2ª Reg. | 5th | |
| 1971–72 | 5 | 1ª Reg. | 7th | |
| 1972–73 | 5 | 1ª Reg. | 16th | |
| 1973–74 | 5 | 1ª Reg. | 5th | |
| 1974–75 | 5 | 1ª Reg. | 5th | |
| 1975–76 | 6 | 2ª Reg. | 9th | |
| 1976–77 | 6 | 2ª Reg. | 4th | |
| 1977–78 | 7 | 2ª Reg. | 2nd | |
| 1978–79 | 7 | 2ª Reg. | 4th | |
| 1979–80 | 7 | 2ª Reg. | 4th | |

| Season | Tier | Division | Place | Copa del Rey |
|---|---|---|---|---|
| 1980–81 | 6 | 1ª Reg. | 4th | |
| 1981–82 | 6 | 1ª Reg. | 4th | |
| 1982–83 | 6 | 1ª Reg. | 2nd | |
| 1983–84 | 5 | Reg. Pref. | 14th | |
| 1984–85 | 5 | Reg. Pref. | 14th | |
| 1985–86 | 5 | Reg. Pref. | 16th | |
| 1986–87 | 5 | Reg. Pref. | 15th | |
| 1987–88 | 5 | Reg. Pref. | 6th | |
| 1988–89 | 5 | Reg. Pref. | 13th | |
| 1989–90 | DNP | | | |
| 1990–91 | 7 | 2ª Reg. | 6th | |
| 1991–92 | 6 | 1ª Reg. | 16th | |
| 1992–93 | 6 | 1ª Reg. | 6th | |
| 1993–94 | 5 | Reg. Pref. | 7th | |
| 1994–95 | 5 | Reg. Pref. | 11th | |
| 1995–96 | 5 | Reg. Pref. | 1st | |
| 1996–97 | 4 | 3ª | 8th | |
| 1997–98 | 4 | 3ª | 6th | |
| 1998–99 | 4 | 3ª | 7th | |
| 1999–2000 | 4 | 3ª | 12th | |

| Season | Tier | Division | Place | Copa del Rey |
|---|---|---|---|---|
| 2000–2007 | DNP | | | |
| 2007–08 | 6 | 1ª Terr. | 1st | |
| 2008–09 | 5 | Terr. Pref. | 7th | |
| 2009–10 | 5 | Terr. Pref. | 4th | |
| 2010–11 | 5 | Pref. Aut. | 10th | |
| 2011–12 | 5 | Pref. Aut. | 4th | |
| 2012–13 | 4 | 3ª | 11th | |
| 2013–14 | 4 | 3ª | 18th | |
| 2014–15 | 5 | Pref. Aut. | 13th | |
| 2015–16 | 5 | Pref. Aut. | 16th | |
| 2016–17 | 6 | 1ª Aut. | 3rd | |
| 2017–18 | 5 | Pref. Aut. | 10th | |
| 2018–19 | 5 | Pref. Aut. | 10th | |
| 2019–20 | 5 | Pref. Aut. | 2nd | |
| 2020–21 | 4 | 3ª | 5th / 5th | |
| 2021–22 | 5 | 3ª RFEF | 10th | |
| 2022–23 | 5 | 3ª Fed. | 16th | |
| 2023–24 | 5 | 3ª Fed. | 13th | |
| 2024–25 | 5 | 3ª Fed. | 16th | |
| 2025–26 | 6 | Pref. Aut. | | |

- 7 seasons in Tercera División
- 4 seasons in Tercera Federación/Tercera División RFEF
