= CF Épila =

Association football club in Spain

Épila
- Full name: Asociación Deportiva Club de Fútbol Épila
- Founded: 1947 (as CD Épila Frente de Juventudes)
- Ground: Estadio La Huerta, Épila, Aragon, Spain
- Capacity: 1,000
- Head coach: (Spain) Juan González
- League: Tercera Federación – Group 17
- 2025–26: Tercera Federación – Group 17, 4th of 18
- Website: http://cfepila.com/
Home colours	Away colours

Asociación Deportiva Club de Fútbol Épila is a Spanish football team based in Épila, in the autonomous community of Aragon. Founded in 1947 they currently play in Tercera Federación – Group 17, holding home matches at Estadio La Huerta, with a capacity of 1,000 seats.

== History ==
=== Club background ===
- Club Deportivo Épila Frente de Juventudes — (1947–73)
- Club Juventud Épila — (1973–90)
- Asociación Deportiva Club de Fútbol Épila — (1990–)

== Season to season ==
=== As CD Épila FJ ===
Season	Tier	Division	Place	Copa del Rey
1960–61	5	2ª Reg.	3rd	
1961–62	4	1ª Reg.	5th	
1962–63	4	1ª Reg.	6th	
1963–64	4	1ª Reg.	8th	
1964–65	4	1ª Reg.	6th	
1965–66	4	1ª Reg.	9th	
1966–67	4	1ª Reg.	1st	

Season	Tier	Division	Place	Copa del Rey
1967–68	3	3ª	15th	
1968–69	4	1ª Reg.	14th	
1969–70	5	1ª Reg.	3rd	
1970–71	5	1ª Reg.	18th	
1971–72	6	2ª Reg.	15th	
1972–73	7	2ª Reg.	(R)	

=== As CJ Épila / AD CF Épila ===
Season	Tier	Division	Place	Copa del Rey
1975–76	7	2ª Reg.	5th	
1976–77	7	2ª Reg.	8th	
1977–78	7	2ª Reg.	1st	
1978–79	6	1ª Reg.	20th	
1979–80	7	2ª Reg.	4th	
1980–81	7	2ª Reg.	3rd	
1981–82	7	2ª Reg.	1st	
1982–83	6	1ª Reg.	3rd	
1983–84	6	1ª Reg.	3rd	
1984–85	6	1ª Reg.	12th	
1985–86	6	1ª Reg.	8th	
1986–87	6	1ª Reg.	3rd	
1987–88	6	1ª Reg.	13th	
1988–89	6	1ª Reg.	9th	
1989–90	6	1ª Reg.	7th	
1990–91	6	1ª Reg.	9th	
1991–92	6	1ª Reg.	2nd	
1992–93	5	Reg. Pref.	4th	
1993–94	5	Reg. Pref.	6th	
1994–95	5	Reg. Pref.	12th	

Season	Tier	Division	Place	Copa del Rey
1995–96	5	Reg. Pref.	1st	
1996–97	4	3ª	19th	
1997–98	5	Reg. Pref.	10th	
1998–99	5	Reg. Pref.	3rd	
1999–2000	5	Reg. Pref.	5th	
2000–01	5	Reg. Pref.	4th	
2001–02	5	Reg. Pref.	6th	
2002–03	5	Reg. Pref.	16th	
2003–04	6	1ª Reg.	2nd	
2004–05	5	Reg. Pref.	17th	
2005–06	6	1ª Reg.	17th	
2006–07	DNP			
2007–08	7	2ª Reg.	3rd	
2008–09	6	1ª Reg.	19th	
2009–10	DNP			
2010–11	7	2ª Reg.	6th	
2011–12	7	2ª Reg.	3rd	
2012–13	7	2ª Reg.	1st	
2013–14	6	1ª Reg.	1st	
2014–15	5	Reg. Pref.	7th	

Season	Tier	Division	Place	Copa del Rey
2015–16	5	Reg. Pref.	1st	
2016–17	4	3ª	19th	
2017–18	5	Reg. Pref.	6th	
2018–19	5	Reg. Pref.	3rd	
2019–20	5	Reg. Pref.	1st	
2020–21	4	3ª	8th / 1st	Preliminary
2021–22	5	3ª RFEF	10th	
2022–23	5	3ª Fed.	8th	
2023–24	5	3ª Fed.	4th	
2024–25	5	3ª Fed.	8th	
2025–26	5	3ª Fed.	4th	
2026–27	5	3ª Fed.		

- 4 seasons in Tercera División
- 6 seasons in Tercera Federación/Tercera División RFEF
