= CD Unión Sur Yaiza =

Spanish football club

Unión Sur Yaiza
- Full name: Club Deportivo Unión Sur Yaiza
- Nickname: Verdinegros
- Founded: 13 June 1983; 43 years ago
- Ground: Municipal, Yaiza, Lanzarote, Canary Islands, Spain
- Capacity: 2,000
- President: Santi Díaz
- Head coach: Juan Antonio Machín
- League: Tercera Federación – Group 12
- 2025–26: Tercera Federación – Group 12, 13th of 18
Home colours	Away colours

Club Deportivo Unión Sur Yaiza is a Spanish football team based in Yaiza, in the autonomous community of Canary Islands. Founded on 13 June 1983, it plays in Tercera Federación – Group 12, holding home matches at Estadio Municipal de Yaiza, with a capacity of 2,000 people.

== Season to season ==
Season	Tier	Division	Place	Copa del Rey
1983–84	8	3ª Reg.		
1984–85	8	3ª Reg.		
1985–86	7	2ª Reg.		
1986–87	7	2ª Reg.		
1987–88	6	1ª Reg.		
1988–89	6	1ª Reg.		
1989–90	6	1ª Reg.	9th	
1990–91	6	1ª Reg.	2nd	
1991–92	6	1ª Reg.	7th	
1992–93	6	1ª Reg.	14th	
1993–94	6	1ª Reg.	10th	
1994–95	6	1ª Reg.	10th	
1995–96	6	1ª Reg.	14th	
1996–97	6	1ª Reg.	6th	
1997–98	6	1ª Reg.	3rd	
1998–99	6	1ª Reg.	2nd	
1999–2000	5	Int. Pref.	5th	
2000–01	5	Int. Pref.	6th	
2001–02	5	Int. Pref.	8th	
2002–03	5	Int. Pref.	3rd	

Season	Tier	Division	Place	Copa del Rey
2003–04	5	Int. Pref.	3rd	
2004–05	5	Int. Pref.	3rd	
2005–06	5	Int. Pref.	2nd	
2006–07	4	3ª	21st	
2007–08	5	Int. Pref.	11th	
2008–09	5	Int. Pref.	13th	
2009–10	5	Int. Pref.	3rd	
2010–11	5	Int. Pref.	8th	
2011–12	5	Int. Pref.	4th	
2012–13	5	Int. Pref.	2nd	
2013–14	4	3ª	9th	
2014–15	4	3ª	5th	
2015–16	4	3ª	11th	
2016–17	4	3ª	7th	
2017–18	4	3ª	10th	
2018–19	4	3ª	18th	
2019–20	5	Int. Pref.	9th	
2020–21	5	Int. Pref.	1st	
2021–22	5	3ª RFEF	6th	
2022–23	5	3ª Fed.	10th	

Season	Tier	Division	Place	Copa del Rey
2023–24	5	3ª Fed.	3rd	
2024–25	4	2ª Fed.	17th	
2025–26	5	3ª Fed.	13th	
2026–27	5	3ª Fed.		

- 1 season in Segunda Federación
- 7 seasons in Tercera División
- 5 seasons in Tercera Federación/Tercera División RFEF
