= CF Ardoi FE =

Association football club in Spain

Ardoi
- Full name: Club de Fútbol Ardoi Fútbol Elkartea
- Founded: 1987
- Ground: El Pinar II, Zizur Mayor, Navarre, Spain
- Capacity: 1,000
- Chairman: José Saiz
- Manager: Iñigo Ardanaz
- League: Primera Autonómica
- 2025–26: Tercera Federación – Group 15, 16th of 18 (relegated)
Home colours	Away colours

Club de Fútbol Ardoi Fútbol Elkartea is a Spanish football team based in Zizur Mayor in the autonomous community of Navarre. Founded in 1987, it plays in Primera Autonómica. Its stadium is Estadio El Pinar II with a capacity of 1,000 seaters.

== History ==
In the 2016-17 season the club fought for remain its place in the Tercera División, and finally escaped from being relegated by finishing 16th.

== Season to season ==
Season	Tier	Division	Place	Copa del Rey
1992–93	6	1ª Reg.	14th	
1993–94	6	1ª Reg.	12th	
1994–95	6	1ª Reg.	10th	
1995–96	6	1ª Reg.	6th	
1996–97	6	1ª Reg.	7th	
1997–98	6	1ª Reg.	7th	
1998–99	6	1ª Reg.	9th	
1999–2000	6	1ª Reg.	5th	
2000–01	6	1ª Reg.	2nd	
2001–02	5	Reg. Pref.	16th	
2002–03	5	Reg. Pref.	9th	
2003–04	5	Reg. Pref.	8th	
2004–05	5	Reg. Pref.	6th	
2005–06	5	Reg. Pref.	1st	
2006–07	4	3ª	16th	
2007–08	4	3ª	15th	
2008–09	4	3ª	19th	
2009–10	5	Reg. Pref.	2nd	
2010–11	4	3ª	17th	
2011–12	5	Reg. Pref.	4th	

Season	Tier	Division	Place	Copa del Rey
2012–13	5	Reg. Pref.	4th	
2013–14	5	Reg. Pref.	1st	
2014–15	4	3ª	14th	
2015–16	4	3ª	6th	
2016–17	4	3ª	17th	
2017–18	4	3ª	7th	
2018–19	4	3ª	13th	
2019–20	4	3ª	16th	
2020–21	4	3ª	3rd / 4th	
2021–22	4	2ª RFEF	17th	
2022–23	5	3ª Fed.	3rd	
2023–24	5	3ª Fed.	3rd	
2024–25	5	3ª Fed.	8th	
2025–26	5	3ª Fed.		

- 1 season in Segunda División RFEF
- 11 seasons in Tercera División
- 4 seasons in Tercera Federación
