= CD Caspe =

Association football club in Spain

Caspe
- Full name: Club Deportivo Caspe
- Founded: 13 March 1923; 103 years ago
- Ground: Los Rosales, Caspe, Aragon, Spain
- Capacity: 1,000
- President: Manuel Piazuelo Callao
- Head coach: Carlos Gil
- League: Tercera Federación – Group 17
- 2025–26: Tercera Federación – Group 17, 5th of 18
- Website: http://www.cdcaspe.es/
Home colours	Away colours

Club Deportivo Caspe is a Spanish football team based in Caspe, in the autonomous community of Aragon. Founded on 13 March 1923, they currently play in Tercera Federación – Group 17, holding home matches at Campo de Fútbol Los Rosales, with a capacity of 1,000 seats.

== Season to season ==
Season	Tier	Division	Place	Copa del Rey
1948–49	4	1ª Reg.	4th	
1949–50	4	1ª Reg.	1st	
1950–51	4	1ª Reg.	3rd	
1951–52	4	1ª Reg.	3rd	
1952–53	4	1ª Reg.	4th	
1953–54	4	1ª Reg.	15th	
1954–55	4	1ª Reg.	8th	
1955–56	4	1ª Reg.	9th	
1956–57	3	3ª	16th	
1957–58	3	3ª	17th	
1958–59	4	1ª Reg.	5th	
1959–60	4	1ª Reg.	1st	
1960–61	3	3ª	9th	
1961–62	3	3ª	13th	
1962–63	3	3ª	8th	
1963–64	3	3ª	7th	
1964–65	3	3ª	9th	
1965–66	3	3ª	14th	
1966–67	3	3ª	10th	
1967–68	3	3ª	16th	

Season	Tier	Division	Place	Copa del Rey
1968–69	4	Reg. Pref.	7th	
1969–70	4	Reg. Pref.	5th	
1970–71	4	Reg. Pref.	12th	
1971–72	4	Reg. Pref.	19th	
1972–73	5	1ª Reg.	2nd	
1973–74	4	Reg. Pref.	16th	
1974–75	4	Reg. Pref.	7th	
1975–76	4	Reg. Pref.	9th	
1976–77	4	Reg. Pref.	9th	
1977–78	5	Reg. Pref.	17th	
1978–79	6	1ª Reg.	1st	
1979–80	5	Reg. Pref.	13th	
1980–81	5	Reg. Pref.	9th	
1981–82	5	Reg. Pref.	16th	
1982–83	5	Reg. Pref.	11th	
1983–84	5	Reg. Pref.	18th	
1984–85	6	1ª Reg.	1st	
1985–86	5	Reg. Pref.	7th	
1986–87	4	3ª	9th	
1987–88	4	3ª	11th	

Season	Tier	Division	Place	Copa del Rey
1988–89	4	3ª	16th	
1989–90	4	3ª	3rd	
1990–91	4	3ª	8th	Second round
1991–92	4	3ª	13th	
1992–93	4	3ª	13th	
1993–94	4	3ª	14th	
1994–95	4	3ª	13th	
1995–96	4	3ª	19th	
1996–97	5	Reg. Pref.	3rd	
1997–98	5	Reg. Pref.	8th	
1998–99	5	Reg. Pref.	4th	
1999–2000	5	Reg. Pref.	5th	
2000–01	5	Reg. Pref.	15th	
2001–02	6	1ª Reg.	3rd	
2002–03	5	Reg. Pref.	16th	
2003–04	6	1ª Reg.	1st	
2004–05	5	Reg. Pref.	3rd	
2005–06	5	Reg. Pref.	1st	
2006–07	4	3ª	19th	
2007–08	5	Reg. Pref.	9th	

Season	Tier	Division	Place	Copa del Rey
2008–09	5	Reg. Pref.	5th	
2009–10	5	Reg. Pref.	16th	
2010–11	6	1ª Reg.	7th	
2011–12	6	1ª Reg.	1st	
2012–13	5	Reg. Pref.	6th	
2013–14	5	Reg. Pref.	2nd	
2014–15	4	3ª	18th	
2015–16	5	Reg. Pref.	5th	
2016–17	5	Reg. Pref.	1st	
2017–18	4	3ª	20th	
2018–19	5	Reg. Pref.	4th	
2019–20	5	Reg. Pref.	5th	
2020–21	5	Reg. Pref.	1st	
2021–22	5	3ª RFEF	9th	
2022–23	5	3ª Fed.	12th	
2023–24	5	3ª Fed.	5th	
2024–25	5	3ª Fed.	11th	
2025–26	5	3ª Fed.	5th	
2026–27	5	3ª Fed.		

- 23 seasons in Tercera División
- 6 seasons in Tercera Federación/Tercera División RFEF
