= CD Español de San Vicente =

Spanish football club

Español de San Vicente
- Full name: Club Deportivo Español de San Vicente
- Nickname: Sanvicenteros
- Founded: 1 August 1967; 59 years ago
- Ground: Ciudad Deportiva, San Vicente, Alicante, Spain
- Capacity: 2,500
- President: José María Mena
- Manager: Jaime Pérez
- League: Tercera Federación – Group 6
- 2025–26: Tercera Federación – Group 6, 14th of 18
- Website: www.cdespanoldesanvicente.com
| Home colours | Away colours |

Club Deportivo Español de San Vicente is a Spanish professional football team based in San Vicente del Raspeig, in the Valencian Community. Founded in 1967, they play in Tercera Federación – Group 6, holding home matches at Ciudad Deportiva de San Vicente del Raspeig, which has a capacity of 2,500 seats.

== History ==
Logo of Jove Español used until 2024

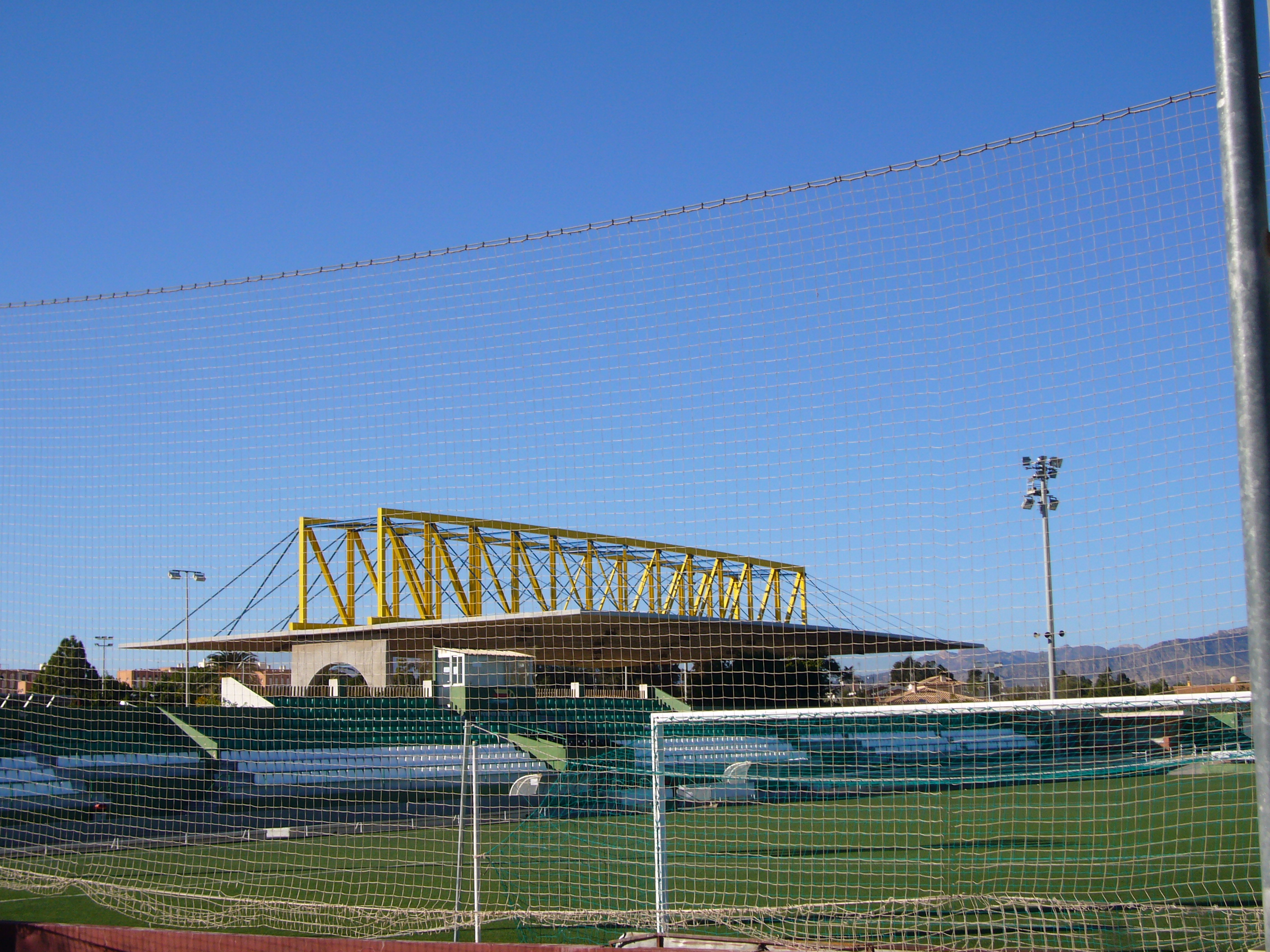
Ciudad Deportiva in San Vicente del Raspeig

Jove Español San Vicente was founded in 2004, after the merger of three teams in the city of Sant Vicent del Raspeig: CD Jove Raspeig, CD Español de San Vicente and FC Cosmos San Vicente. It first reached Tercera División two years later, going on to remain several consecutive seasons in that level.

It acted as a farm team for Hércules CF several times, the last one starting in 2013 and ending in 2014.

On 11 January 2024, Jove Español released a statement explaining that the club was originally founded in 1989 under the name of AD Español de San Vicente, with the club being renamed CD Español de San Vicente in 1994 and absorbing CD Sporting San Vicente and CF San Vicente del Raspeig in 2000. Español also absorbed (not merged with) CD Jove Raspeig in July 2004, with other teams from the city (Cosmos, Rigas) being dissolved in a "census". In July, it was concluded that the club was originally founded in 1967 as CD Español.

In January 2026, Jove Español began preparations for their 60th anniversary, which included a change to their original name of CD Español de San Vicente, officially effective as of 1 July. In February, the Valencian Community Football Federation confirmed that the club was the same since 1967.

=== Club background ===
- Club Deportivo Español - (1967–1974)
- Unión Deportiva Español - (1974–1989)
- Agrupación Deportiva Español de San Vicente - (1989–1996)
- Club Deportivo Español de San Vicente - (1996–2004; 2026–)
- Fútbol Club Jove Español de San Vicente - (2004–2026)

== Season to season ==
| Season | Tier | Division | Place | Copa del Rey |
|---|---|---|---|---|
| 1967–68 | 4 | 1ª Reg. | 4th | |
| 1968–69 | 4 | 1ª Reg. | 5th | |
| 1969–70 | 4 | 1ª Reg. | 1st | |
| 1970–71 | 3 | 3ª | 14th | First round |
| 1971–72 | 3 | 3ª | 19th | |
| 1972–73 | 4 | Reg. Pref. | 3rd | |
| 1973–74 | 4 | Reg. Pref. | 4th | |
| 1974–75 | 4 | Reg. Pref. | 3rd | |
| 1975–76 | 4 | Reg. Pref. | 16th | |
| 1976–77 | 4 | Reg. Pref. | 4th | |
| 1977–78 | 4 | 3ª | 16th | Second round |
| 1978–79 | 4 | 3ª | 14th | Second round |
| 1979–80 | 4 | 3ª | 18th | Second round |
| 1980–81 | 4 | 3ª | 17th | |
| 1981–82 | 4 | 3ª | 19th | |
| 1982–83 | 5 | Reg. Pref. | 15th | |
| 1983–84 | 5 | Reg. Pref. | 15th | |
| 1984–85 | 5 | Reg. Pref. | 13th | |
| 1985–86 | 5 | Reg. Pref. | 16th | |
| 1986–87 | 5 | Reg. Pref. | 19th | |

| Season | Tier | Division | Place | Copa del Rey |
|---|---|---|---|---|
| 1987–88 | 5 | Reg. Pref. | 22nd | |
| 1988–89 | DNP | | | |
| 1989–90 | 7 | 2ª Reg. | 1st | |
| 1990–91 | 6 | 1ª Reg. | 2nd | |
| 1991–92 | 5 | Reg. Pref. | 4th | |
| 1992–93 | 5 | Reg. Pref. | 3rd | |
| 1993–94 | 5 | Reg. Pref. | 12th | |
| 1994–95 | 5 | Reg. Pref. | 1st | |
| 1995–96 | 4 | 3ª | 5th | |
| 1996–97 | 4 | 3ª | 7th | |
| 1997–98 | 4 | 3ª | 18th | |
| 1998–99 | 5 | Reg. Pref. | 12th | |
| 1999–2000 | 5 | Reg. Pref. | 13th | |
| 2000–01 | 5 | Reg. Pref. | 7th | |
| 2001–02 | 5 | Reg. Pref. | 15th | |
| 2002–03 | 5 | Reg. Pref. | 17th | |
| 2003–04 | 6 | 1ª Reg. | 1st | |
| 2004–05 | 5 | Reg. Pref. | 11th | |
| 2005–06 | 5 | Reg. Pref. | 1st | |
| 2006–07 | 4 | 3ª | 16th | |

| Season | Tier | Division | Place | Copa del Rey |
|---|---|---|---|---|
| 2007–08 | 4 | 3ª | 10th | |
| 2008–09 | 4 | 3ª | 13th | |
| 2009–10 | 4 | 3ª | 14th | |
| 2010–11 | 4 | 3ª | 13th | |
| 2011–12 | 4 | 3ª | 10th | |
| 2012–13 | 4 | 3ª | 13th | |
| 2013–14 | 4 | 3ª | 12th | N/A (Note: Reserve team of Hércules.) |
| 2014–15 | 4 | 3ª | 16th | |
| 2015–16 | 4 | 3ª | 18th | |
| 2016–17 | 5 | Reg. Pref. | 9th | |
| 2017–18 | 5 | Reg. Pref. | 2nd | |
| 2018–19 | 4 | 3ª | 7th | |
| 2019–20 | 4 | 3ª | 11th | |
| 2020–21 | 4 | 3ª | 6th / 5th | |
| 2021–22 | 5 | 3ª RFEF | 14th | |
| 2022–23 | 5 | 3ª Fed. | 14th | |
| 2023–24 | 5 | 3ª Fed. | 2nd | |
| 2024–25 | 5 | 3ª Fed. | 13th | First round |
| 2025–26 | 5 | 3ª Fed. | 14th | |
| 2026–27 | 5 | 3ª Fed. | | |

- 23 seasons in Tercera División
- 6 seasons in Tercera Federación/Tercera División RFEF
