= Raúl Rubio =

Spanish footballer

Personal information
- Full name: Raúl Rubio Romero
- Date of birth: 4 July 1999 (age 27)
- Place of birth: Zaragoza, Spain
- Position: Forward

Team information
- Current team: Avilés
- Number: 11

Youth career
- 2014–2017: Giner Torrero
- 2017–2018: Zaragoza
- 2017–2018: → El Olivar (loan)

Senior career*
Years	Team	Apps	(Gls)
2018–2019	Ejea	8	(0)
2019–2021	Brea	43	(13)
2021–2023	Zaragoza B	54	(22)
2022–2023	Zaragoza	1	(0)
2023–2024	Calahorra	19	(6)
2024–2025	SD Logroñés	31	(11)
2025–	Avilés	35	(3)
- * Club domestic league appearances and goals as of 9 June 2026

Raúl Rubio Romero (born 4 July 1999) is a Spanish footballer who plays as a forward for Avilés.

== Club career ==
Born in Zaragoza, Aragon, Rubio began his career with CD Giner Torrero before joining Real Zaragoza in 2017; the club immediately loaned him to EM El Olivar. On 20 July 2018, after finishing his formation, he signed for Segunda División B side SD Ejea.

Rubio made his senior debut on 22 September 2018, coming on as a late substitute in a 0–2 home loss against Villarreal CF B. The following July, after featuring rarely, he moved to CD Brea in Tercera División.

In July 2021, Rubio returned to Zaragoza, being initially assigned to the reserves in Tercera División RFEF. On 8 May of the following year, after helping in the B-team's promotion with 19 goals, he made his first team debut by replacing fellow youth graduate Iván Azón in a 0–3 home loss against AD Alcorcón in the Segunda División.
