= Juan Alonso (footballer, born 1998) =

Mexican footballer

Personal information
- Full name: Juan Gerardo Ramírez Alonso
- Date of birth: 16 May 1998 (age 28)
- Place of birth: Guadalajara, Mexico
- Height: 1.77 m (5 ft 10 in)
- Position: Defender

Team information
- Current team: Ribert

Youth career
- –2017: Club Necaxa
- 2018: Cruz Azul

Senior career*
Years	Team	Apps	(Gls)
2018–2019	Lorca Deportiva	9	(0)
2019	Stumbras	13	(0)
2019–2020	Roda JC	3	(0)
2021	Tepatitlán	0	(0)
2021–	Ribert	2	(0)
- * Club domestic league appearances and goals as of 12 September 2021

Juan Gerardo Ramírez Alonso (born 16 May 1998) is a Mexican footballer who plays as a defender for Spanish club Ribert in the fifth-tier Tercera División RFEF. Besides Mexico, he has played for clubs in Spain, Lithuania and the Netherlands.

== Career statistics ==
=== Club ===
As of 16 November 2019.

Club	Season	League			Cup		Continental		Other		Total	
Club	Season	Division	Apps	Goals	Apps	Goals	Apps	Goals	Apps	Goals	Apps	Goals
Lorca Deportiva	2018–19	Tercera División	9	0	0	0	–		0	0	9	0
Stumbras	2019	A Lyga	13	0	0	0	0	0	0	0	13	0
Roda JC	2019–20	Eerste Divisie	3	0	1 (Note: Appearances in the KNVB Cup)	0	–		0	0	4	0
Career total			25	0	1	0	0	0	0	0	26	0
