= CD Don Álvaro =

Association football team in Spain

Don Álvaro
- Full name: Club Deportivo Don Álvaro
- Founded: 1977
- Ground: Pedro Manuel Barrero Macias, Don Álvaro, Badajoz, Extremadura, Spain
- Capacity: 500
- President: Moisés Prieto
- Manager: Samuel Vázquez
- League: Primera Extremeña – Group 4
- 2024–25: Primera Extremeña – Group 3, 7th of 12
Home colours	Away colours

Club Deportivo Don Álvaro is a football team based in Don Álvaro, Badajoz, in the autonomous community of Extremadura. The club play in Primera Extremeña – Group 4, holding home matches at the Estadio Municipal Pedro Manuel Barrero Macias, with a capacity of 500 people.

== History ==
Founded in 1977, Don Álvaro played regional football until 2021, when the club achieved a first-ever promotion to Tercera División RFEF. With a population of around 770 people at the time, they became the club from the smallest town in the history of the division (including the old Tercera División).

== Season to season ==
Season	Tier	Division	Place	Copa del Rey
1978–79	7	2ª Reg.	7th	
1979–80	7	2ª Reg.	4th	
1980–81	7	2ª Reg.	9th	
1981–82	7	2ª Reg.		
1982–83	7	2ª Reg.		
1983–84	7	2ª Reg.		
1984–85	7	2ª Reg.		
1985–86	6	1ª Reg.	16th	
1986–87	6	1ª Reg.	11th	
1987–88	6	1ª Reg.	9th	
1988–89	6	1ª Reg.	3rd	
1989–90	5	Reg. Pref.	13th	
1990–91	5	Reg. Pref.	12th	
1991–92	5	Reg. Pref.	9th	
1992–93	5	Reg. Pref.	7th	
1993–94	5	Reg. Pref.	18th	
1994–95	6	1ª Reg.	8th	
1995–96	6	1ª Reg.	1st	
1996–97	5	Reg. Pref.	20th	
1997–98	6	1ª Reg.	2nd	

Season	Tier	Division	Place	Copa del Rey
1998–99	5	Reg. Pref.	19th	
1999–2000	6	1ª Reg.	12th	
2000–01	6	1ª Reg.	12th	
2001–02	6	1ª Reg.	7th	
2002–03	6	1ª Reg.	3rd	
2003–04	6	1ª Reg.	5th	
2004–05	6	1ª Reg.	6th	
2005–06	6	1ª Reg.	6th	
2006–07	6	1ª Reg.	5th	
2007–08	6	1ª Reg.	13th	
2008–09	6	1ª Reg.	12th	
2009–10	6	1ª Reg.	9th	
2010–11	6	1ª Reg.	4th	
2011–12	5	Reg. Pref.	14th	
2012–13	6	1ª Reg.	7th	
2013–14	6	1ª Reg.	7th	
2014–15	6	1ª Reg.	4th	
2015–16	5	Reg. Pref.	12th	
2016–17	5	1ª Ext.	4th	
2017–18	5	1ª Ext.	7th	

Season	Tier	Division	Place	Copa del Rey
2018–19	5	1ª Ext.	7th	
2019–20	5	1ª Ext.	5th	
2020–21	5	1ª Ext.	2nd	
2021–22	5	3ª RFEF	12th	
2022–23	5	3ª Fed.	13th	
2023–24	5	3ª Fed.	15th	
2024–25	6	1ª Ext.	7th	
2025–26	6	1ª Ext.		

- 3 seasons in Tercera Federación/Tercera División RFEF
