= David Mainz =

Spanish footballer

Personal information
- Full name: David Emilio Mainz Navarro
- Date of birth: 21 June 1985 (age 41)
- Place of birth: Sádaba, Spain
- Height: 1.78 m (5 ft 10 in)
- Position: Forward

Team information
- Current team: Sadabense

Youth career
- Ejea

Senior career*
Years	Team	Apps	(Gls)
2004–2005	Ejea		
2005–2006	Santa Anastasia		
2006–2008	Zuera		
2008–2009	Universidad Zaragoza		
2009–2010	Ejea	33	(12)
2010–2011	La Muela	35	(9)
2011–2013	Eibar	70	(22)
2013–2014	Jorge Wilstermann	18	(4)
2014	Eibar	13	(2)
2014	AEL	0	(0)
2015–2016	Huesca	36	(13)
2016–2017	Hércules	53	(11)
2017–2019	Ebro	57	(5)
2019–2020	Ejea	40	(8)
2020–2021	Borja	22	(6)
2021–2022	Santa Anastasia	30	(11)
2024–	Sadabense	5	(1)
- * Club domestic league appearances and goals as of 24 May 2025

David Emilio Mainz Navarro (born 21 June 1985) is a Spanish footballer who plays for Regional Preferente Aragón club CD Sadabense as a forward.

== Club career ==
Born in Sádaba, Province of Zaragoza, Mainz made his senior debuts with SD Ejea in the 2004–05 season, in Tercera División. He first arrived in Segunda División B in 2010, signing with CD La Muela also in his native Aragon.

On 9 July 2011, Mainz joined fellow league team SD Eibar. In his second year he scored 11 goals in the regular season (plus two in the play-offs), helping the Basque side to return to Segunda División after a four-year absence.

On 29 May 2013, Mainz announced he was moving to Club Jorge Wilstermann from Bolivia, being presented on 9 July. On 23 January of the following year, however, he returned to both his country and Eibar.

Mainz appeared in his first game as a professional on 1 February 2014, starting in a 1–0 home win against UD Las Palmas. He appeared in 13 matches during the campaign, as the Armeros were promoted to La Liga for the first time ever.

On 11 July 2014, Mainz terminated his contract with Eibar and moved to Greek Football League side Athlitiki Enosi Larissa F.C. six days later. On 14 December, however, he returned to his home country and signed for SD Huesca in the third level.
