= Raúl Ruiz (footballer) =

Spanish footballer (born 1990)

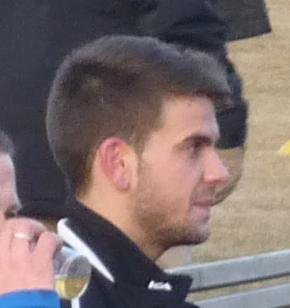
- Ruiz in 2011

Personal information
- Full name: Raúl Ruiz Matarín
- Date of birth: 25 March 1990 (age 36)
- Place of birth: Alicante, Spain
- Height: 1.78 m (5 ft 10 in)
- Position: Right-back

Team information
- Current team: Torrellano

Youth career
- 1998–2000: Sporting Plaza Argel
- 2000–2008: Hércules

Senior career*
| Years | Team | Apps | (Gls) |
| 2008–2009 | Hércules B | | |
| 2008–2009 | Hércules | 10 | (1) |
| 2009–2012 | Real Madrid B | 15 | (0) |
| 2011 | → Halmstad (loan) | 14 | (1) |
| 2012–2014 | Albacete | 27 | (0) |
| 2013 | → S.S. Reyes (loan) | 12 | (0) |
| 2014–2019 | Guijuelo | 167 | (15) |
| 2019–2020 | AEK Larnaca | 12 | (0) |
| 2020 | → Hércules (loan) | 7 | (0) |
| 2020–2023 | Hércules | 77 | (6) |
| 2023–2024 | Torrent | 30 | (3) |
| 2024– | Torrellano | 69 | (13) |

International career
| 2009 | Spain U19 | 5 | (1) |
| 2008 | Spain U21 | 1 | (0) |
- * Club domestic league appearances and goals as of 16:42, 23 October 2026 (UTC)

Raúl Ruiz Matarín (born 25 March 1990) is a Spanish professional footballer who plays as a right-back for Tercera Federación club Torrellano.

== Club career ==
Ruiz was born in Alicante, Valencian Community. He reached the club's youth system at the age of 10, being promoted to hometown Hércules CF's first team for the 2008–09 season; initially a winger, he appeared sparingly – but scored once – as they fell short of a La Liga promotion.

Ruiz signed with Real Madrid in summer 2009, being immediately assigned to their reserves. On 1 February 2011, he was loaned to Allsvenskan side Halmstads BK along with Castilla teammates Javi Hernández and José Zamora.

In late January 2012, Ruiz terminated his contract with Real Madrid and joined Albacete Balompié in the Segunda División B until June 2013. Following a loan stint at UD San Sebastián de los Reyes of the same league, he featured more regularly during the 2013–14 campaign, which ended in promotion.

On 1 August 2014, Ruiz joined CD Guijuelo also in the third tier. He left in June 2019 with 173 competitive appearances to his credit, agreeing to a contract at Cypriot First Division's AEK Larnaca FC where he featured in the UEFA Europa League, scoring in a 3–0 home win against PFC Levski Sofia in the second qualifying round.

Ruiz then spent three and a half seasons at his former employers Hércules, having arrived in January 2020 initially on loan. On 24 July 2023, the 33-year-old moved to amateurs Torrent CF also in the Valencian Community.

== International career ==
In November 2008, Ruiz was called by the Spain under-21 team, appearing in a friendly with Portugal in Cartaxo. He came on as a substitute for Dani Parejo in the 80th minute of the 4–1 loss.

On 10 February 2009, also from the bench and in a friendly (he replaced Fran Mérida at half-time), Ruiz scored the third and final goal for the under-19s in a 3–0 victory over England in Bournemouth.

== Career statistics ==
As of match played 19 May 2021

Appearances and goals by club, season and competition
| Club | Season | League | | | National Cup | | Continental | | Other | | Total | |
| Club | Season | Division | Apps | Goals | Apps | Goals | Apps | Goals | Apps | Goals | Apps | Goals |
|---|---|---|---|---|---|---|---|---|---|---|---|---|
| Hércules | 2008–09 | Segunda División | 10 | 1 | 3 | 0 | — | | — | | 13 | 1 |
| Real Madrid | 2009–10 | La Liga | 0 | 0 | 0 | 0 | 0 | 0 | — | | 0 | 0 |
| Real Madrid B | 2010–11 | Segunda División B | 15 | 0 | — | | — | | — | | 15 | 0 |
| Halmstad (loan) | 2011 | Allsvenskan | 14 | 1 | 2 | 0 | — | | — | | 16 | 1 |
| Albacete | 2011–12 | Segunda División B | 6 | 0 | 0 | 0 | — | | 2 (Note: Appearances in Segunda División B play-offs) | 0 | 8 | 0 |
| Albacete | 2012–13 | Segunda División B | 4 | 0 | 2 | 0 | — | | — | | 6 | 0 |
| Albacete | 2013–14 | Segunda División B | 17 | 0 | 1 | 0 | — | | 3 | 0 | 21 | 0 |
| Albacete | Total | | 27 | 0 | 3 | 0 | 0 | 0 | 5 | 0 | 35 | 0 |
| S.S. Reyes (loan) | 2012–13 | Segunda División B | 12 | 0 | — | | — | | — | | 12 | 0 |
| Guijuelo | 2014–15 | Segunda División B | 32 | 3 | 1 | 0 | — | | — | | 33 | 3 |
| Guijuelo | 2015–16 | Segunda División B | 30 | 0 | 1 | 0 | — | | — | | 31 | 0 |
| Guijuelo | 2016–17 | Segunda División B | 35 | 6 | 4 | 0 | — | | — | | 39 | 6 |
| Guijuelo | 2017–18 | Segunda División B | 35 | 2 | 0 | 0 | — | | — | | 35 | 2 |
| Guijuelo | 2018–19 | Segunda División B | 35 | 4 | 0 | 0 | — | | — | | 35 | 4 |
| Guijuelo | Total | | 167 | 15 | 6 | 0 | 0 | 0 | 0 | 0 | 173 | 15 |
| AEK Larnaca | 2019–20 | Cypriot First Division | 12 | 0 | 1 | 0 | 6 (Note: Appearances in UEFA Europa League) | 1 | — | | 19 | 1 |
| Hércules (loan) | 2019–20 | Segunda División B | 7 | 0 | 0 | 0 | — | | — | | 7 | 0 |
| Hércules | 2020–21 | Segunda División B | 15 | 0 | 0 | 0 | — | | — | | 15 | 0 |
| Hércules | Total | | 22 | 0 | 0 | 0 | 0 | 0 | 0 | 0 | 22 | 0 |
| Career total | | | 279 | 17 | 15 | 0 | 6 | 1 | 5 | 0 | 305 | 18 |
