= Diego Romero (footballer, born 1975) =

Argentine footballer

Personal information
- Full name: Diego Adrián Romero Oivadis
- Date of birth: 3 January 1975 (age 51)
- Place of birth: Quilmes, Argentina
- Height: 1.73 m (5 ft 8 in)
- Position: Defensive midfielder

Youth career
- Quilmes

Senior career*
Years	Team	Apps	(Gls)
1995–1998	Quilmes	34	(6)
1998–2002	Atlético Rafaela	93	(10)
2002–2003	Mura	24	(2)
2003–2004	Durango	30	(0)
2006	Olmedo	40	(3)
2007	Técnico Universitario	14	(0)
2007–2008	Villanueva	34	(1)
2008–2009	Unión Estepona	32	(2)
2009	Defensores Unidos	0	(0)
2009–2010	Los Barrios	45	(1)
2010–2011	San Pedro	19	(0)
2011–2014	Formentera	93	(6)
2014–2015	Sant Jordi	22	(3)
2015–2016	Montuïri	17	(0)
2016–2018	Santanyí	41	(0)
2018–2020	Son Verí		
Total		538+	(34+)
- * Club domestic league appearances and goals

Diego Adrián Romero Oivadis (born 3 January 1975) is an Argentine former professional footballer who played as a defensive midfielder.

== Club career ==
After coming through the youth ranks at hometown side Quilmes, Romero joined Atlético de Rafaela in 1998. After leaving the club in 2002, he represented Slovenia's Mura, Mexico's Alacranes de Durango and Ecuador's Olmedo and Técnico Universitario before arriving in Spain in 2007 to play for Villanueva.

Romero went on to resume his career in the Spanish lower levels, playing for Unión Estepona, Los Barrios, San Pedro, Formentera, Sant Jordi, Montuïri, Santanyí and UD Son Verí, achieving promotions to Tercera División with both Formentera and Santanyí.

== Personal life ==
Romero's sons Luka and Tobías are also footballers. The former is an attacking midfielder and plays for Liga MX club Cruz Azul, while the latter is a goalkeeper.
