= 2021–22 Tercera División RFEF =

Tercera División RFEF
- Season: 2021–22
- Dates: 4 September 2021 – 24 April 2022

The 2021–22 Tercera División RFEF season was the first for the national fifth level in the Spanish football league system. The league has 18 groups like the former fourth tier Tercera División.

== Competition format ==
- The group champions were promoted to 2022–23 Segunda División RFEF.
- The next four eligible teams in each group played in the promotion play-offs.
- The champion of each group qualified for 2022–23 Copa del Rey. If the champion was a reserve team, the first non-reserve team qualified would join the Copa.
- In each group, at least three teams were relegated to regional divisions; the relegation of each group was configured so that all Tercera División RFEF groups would have 16 teams for the 2022–23 season.

== Overview before the season ==
A total of 320 teams made up the league: 26 relegated from the 2020–21 Segunda División B, 234 retained from the 2020–21 Tercera División, and 60 promoted from the regional divisions.

== Groups ==
=== Group 1 – Galicia ===
Teams retained from 2020–21 Tercera División

- Alondras
- Arzúa
- Barco
- Choco
- Estradense
- Deportivo Fabril
- Ourense CF
- Polvorín
- Racing Vilalbés
- Rápido Bouzas
- Silva
- Somozas
- Viveiro

Teams promoted from 2020–21 Preferente de Galicia

- Atlético Arnoia
- Juvenil Ponteareas
- Noia
- Sofán

==== Teams and locations ====
Location of teams of the 2021–22 Tercera División Group 1

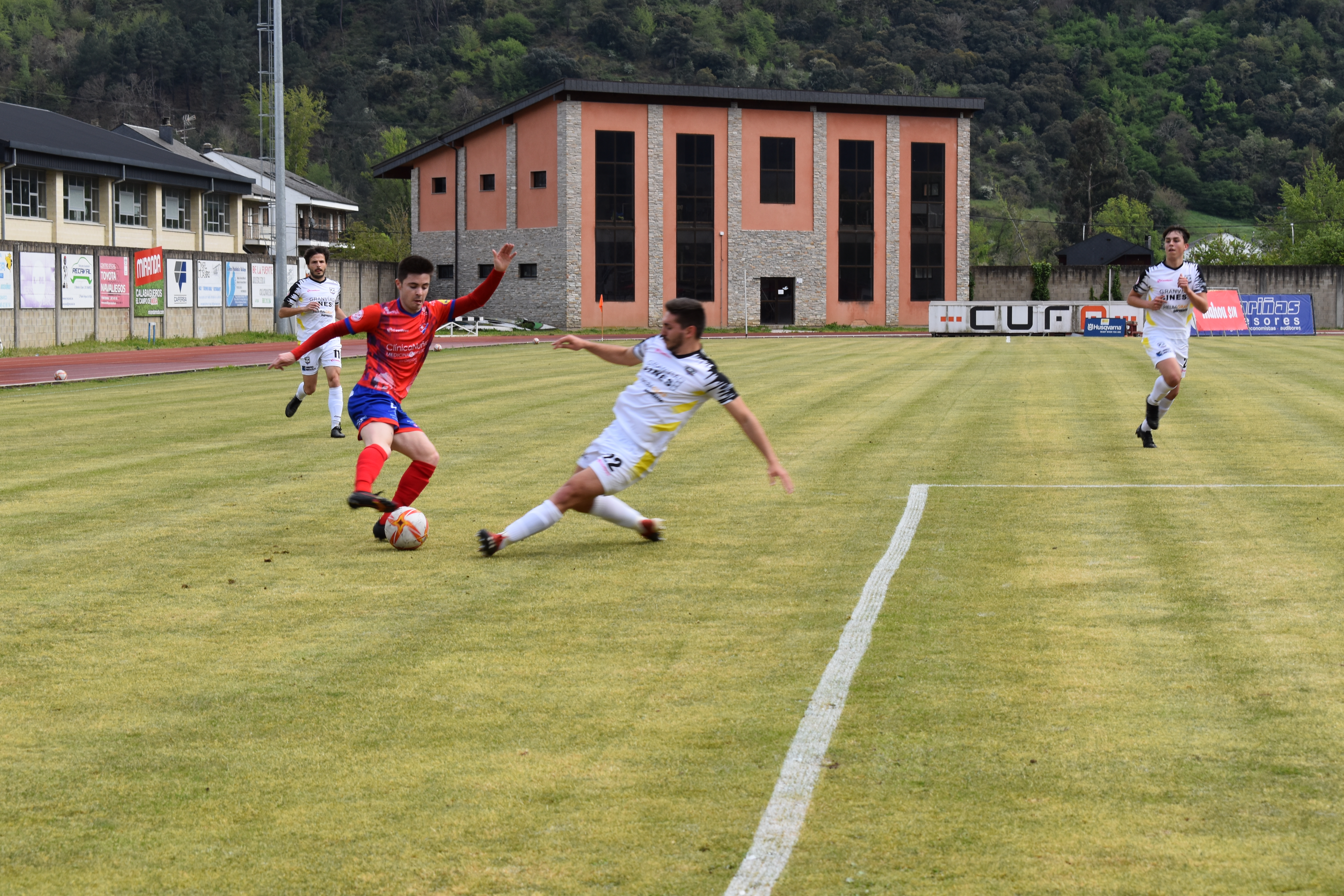
CD Barco - Atlético Arnoia.

Team	City	Home ground
Alondras	Cangas	O Morrazo
Arzúa	Arzúa	Do Viso
Atlético Arnoia	A Arnoia	Municipal de Barreiro
Barco	O Barco de Valdeorras	Calabagueiros
Choco	Redondela	Santa Mariña
Deportivo Fabril	Abegondo	Abegondo
Estradense	A Estrada	Municipal
Juvenil Ponteareas	Ponteareas	Municipal de Pardellas
Noia	Noia	San Lázaro
Ourense	Ourense	O Couto
Polvorín	Lugo	O Polvorín
Racing Villalbés	Vilalba	A Magdalena
Rápido de Bouzas	Vigo	Baltasar Pujales
Silva	A Coruña	A Grela
Sofán	Carballo	O Carral
Somozas	As Somozas	Pardiñas
Viveiro	Viveiro	Cantarrana

==== League table ====
Pos	Team	Pld	W	D	L	GF	GA	GD	Pts	Qualification
1	Polvorín (C, P)	32	20	8	4	54	23	+31	68	Promotion to Segunda División RFEF
2	Ourense CF (O, P)	32	19	10	3	48	21	+27	67	Qualification for the promotion play-offs and Copa del Rey
3	Somozas	32	19	6	7	43	30	+13	63	Qualification for the promotion play-offs
4	Barco	32	15	9	8	50	37	+13	54	Qualification for the promotion play-offs
5	Deportivo Fabril	32	15	8	9	49	23	+26	53	Qualification for the promotion play-offs
6	Rápido Bouzas	32	12	15	5	39	26	+13	51	
7	Racing Villalbés	32	12	14	6	43	24	+19	50	
8	Estradense	32	12	8	12	36	40	−4	44	
9	Alondras	32	9	13	10	30	29	+1	40	
10	Silva	32	11	6	15	34	41	−7	39	
11	Arzúa	32	8	14	10	29	35	−6	38	
12	Viveiro	32	8	12	12	32	42	−10	36	
13	Choco	32	8	11	13	31	42	−11	35	
14	Noia (R)	32	7	8	17	30	49	−19	29	Relegation to Preferente de Galicia
15	Juvenil Ponteareas (R)	32	7	7	18	25	43	−18	28	Relegation to Preferente de Galicia
16	Atlético Arnoia (R)	32	4	10	18	25	54	−29	22	Relegation to Preferente de Galicia
17	Sofán (R)	32	4	5	23	29	68	−39	17	Relegation to Preferente de Galicia

Updated to match(es) played on 24 April 2022. Source:
Rules for classification: 1) points; 2) head-to-head points; 3) head-to-head goal difference; 4) goal difference; 5) number of goals scored
(C) Champions; (O) Play-off winners; (P) Promoted; (R) Relegated

=== Group 2 – Asturias ===
Teams retained from 2020–21 Tercera División

- Caudal
- Colunga
- Gijón Industrial
- L'Entregu
- Lenense
- Llanes
- Mosconia
- Navarro
- Praviano
- Real Titánico
- San Martín
- Tuilla
- Urraca

Teams relegated from 2020–21 Segunda División B

- Covadonga
- Lealtad
- Oviedo Vetusta
- Sporting Gijón B

Teams promoted from 2020–21 Regional Preferente

- Langreo B
- Luarca
- Roces

==== Teams and locations ====
Location of the 2021–22 Tercera División Group 2

Team	City	Home ground
Caudal	Mieres	Hermanos Antuña
Colunga	Colunga	Santianes
Covadonga	Oviedo	Juan Antonio Álvarez Rabanal
Gijón Industrial	Gijón	Santa Cruz
L'Entregu	El Entrego, San Martín del Rey Aurelio	Nuevo Nalón
Langreo B	Langreo	Ganzábal
Lealtad	Villaviciosa	Les Caleyes
Lenense	Pola de Lena, Lena	El Sotón
Llanes	Llanes	San José
Luarca	Luarca	La Veigona
Mosconia	Grado	Marqués de la Vega de Anzo
Navarro	Valliniello, Avilés	Tabiella
Oviedo Vetusta	Oviedo	El Requexón
Praviano	Pravia	Santa Catalina
Roces	Gijón	Covadonga
San Martín	Sotrondio, San Martín del Rey Aurelio	El Florán
Sporting Gijón B	Gijón	Pepe Ortiz
Titánico	Laviana	Las Tolvas
Tuilla	Tuilla, Langreo	El Candín
Urraca	Posada, Llanes	La Corredoria

==== League table ====
Pos	Team	Pld	W	D	L	GF	GA	GD	Pts	Qualification
1	Oviedo Vetusta (C, P)	38	23	6	9	75	39	+36	75	Promotion to Segunda División RFEF
2	Sporting Gijón B	38	21	11	6	71	25	+46	74	Qualification for the promotion play-offs
3	Lealtad (O)	38	20	11	7	55	27	+28	71	Qualification for the promotion play-offs and Copa del Rey
4	Llanes	38	18	10	10	50	36	+14	64 (Note: Llanes finished ahead of Caudal on head-to-head points: Caudal–Llanes 1–1, Llanes–Caudal 3–2)	Qualification for the promotion play-offs
5	Caudal	38	17	13	8	55	37	+18	64	Qualification for the promotion play-offs
6	Colunga	38	15	16	7	51	32	+19	61	
7	L'Entregu (Note: Gijón Industrial awarded a 0–3 win in their Round 31 match against L'Entregu after the latter fielded an ineligible player. The match originally ended 4–2)	38	15	12	11	48	39	+9	57	
8	Praviano	38	14	14	10	51	44	+7	56	
9	Tuilla	38	14	11	13	50	55	−5	53	
10	Covadonga	38	13	12	13	48	44	+4	51	
11	Luarca	38	13	10	15	36	52	−16	49	
12	Real Titánico	38	12	12	14	46	48	−2	48	
13	Gijón Industrial (Note: Relegated due to relegations of regional teams from Segunda División RFEF) (R)	38	12	11	15	43	52	−9	47 (Note: Gijón Industrial and Urraca finished ahead of San Martín on head-to-head points: Gijón Industrial 7 pts, Urraca 7 pts, San Martín 3 pts. Gijón Industrial finished ahead of Urraca on head-to-head points: Urraca–Gijón Industrial 1–1, Gijón Industrial–Urraca 2–0)	Relegation to Regional Preferente
14	Urraca (R)	38	11	14	13	31	35	−4	47	Relegation to Regional Preferente
15	San Martín (R)	38	12	11	15	44	48	−4	47	Relegation to Regional Preferente
16	Lenense (R)	38	12	10	16	39	48	−9	46	Relegation to Regional Preferente
17	Roces (R)	38	8	12	18	40	62	−22	36	Relegation to Regional Preferente
18	Navarro (R)	38	6	15	17	29	55	−26	33	Relegation to Regional Preferente
19	Langreo B (R)	38	7	5	26	36	80	−44	26	Relegation to Regional Preferente
20	Mosconia (R)	38	6	6	26	30	70	−40	24	Relegation to Regional Preferente

Updated to match(es) played on 1 May 2022. Source:
Rules for classification: 1) points; 2) head-to-head points; 3) head-to-head goal difference; 4) goal difference; 5) number of goals scored
(C) Champions; (O) Play-off winners; (P) Promoted; (R) Relegated

=== Group 3 – Cantabria ===
Teams retained from 2020–21 Tercera División

- Atlético Albericia
- Barreda
- Cartes
- Castro
- Escobedo
- Gimnástica Torrelavega
- Guarnizo
- Sámano
- Selaya
- Siete Villas
- Textil Escudo
- Torina
- Vimenor

Teams promoted from 2020–21 Regional Preferente

- Colindres
- Naval
- Noja

==== Teams and locations ====
Location of teams of the 2021–22 Tercera División Group 3

Team	City	Home ground
Atlético Albericia	Santander	Juan Hormaechea
Barreda	Barreda, Torrelavega	Solvay
Cartes	Cartes	El Ansar
Castro	Castro Urdiales	Mioño
Colindres	Colindres	El Carmen
Escobedo	Escobedo, Camargo	Eusebio Arce
Gimnástica Torrelavega	Torrelavega	El Malecón
Guarnizo	Guarnizo, El Astillero	El Pilar
Naval	Reinosa	San Francisco
Noja	Noja	La Caseta
Sámano	Sámano, Castro Urdiales	Vallegón
Selaya	Selaya	El Castañal
Siete Villas	Castillo, Arnuero	San Pedro
Textil Escudo	Cabezón de la Sal	Municipal
Torina	Bárcena de Pie de Concha	Municipal
Vimenor	Vioño de Piélagos, Piélagos	La Vidriera

==== League table ====
Pos	Team	Pld	W	D	L	GF	GA	GD	Pts	Qualification
1	Gimnástica Torrelavega (C, P)	30	19	8	3	69	17	+52	65	Promotion to Segunda División RFEF and qualification for Copa del Rey
2	Vimenor	30	16	9	5	49	27	+22	57	Qualification for the promotion play-offs and Copa del Rey
3	Escobedo (O)	30	16	6	8	53	27	+26	54	Qualification for the promotion play-offs
4	Naval	30	13	9	8	41	26	+15	48	Qualification for the promotion play-offs
5	Torina	30	12	10	8	34	25	+9	46 (Note: Torina finished ahead of Sámano on head-to-head points: Torina–Sámano 0–0, Sámano–Torina 0–1)	Qualification for the promotion play-offs
6	Sámano	30	13	7	10	35	33	+2	46	
7	Atlético Albericia	30	11	11	8	38	35	+3	44	
8	Guarnizo	30	9	15	6	36	30	+6	42	
9	Siete Villas	30	11	8	11	41	41	0	41	
10	Cartes	30	8	13	9	31	37	−6	37 (Note: Cartes finished ahead of Castro on head-to-head points: Cartes–Castro 2–0, Castro–Cartes 3–3)	
11	Castro	30	8	13	9	34	43	−9	37	
12	Textil Escudo	30	7	11	12	24	38	−14	32	
13	Noja	30	6	9	15	32	57	−25	27	
14	Barreda	30	5	10	15	26	47	−21	25	
15	Colindres (R)	30	5	6	19	26	58	−32	21	Relegation to Regional Preferente
16	Selaya (R)	30	2	13	15	20	48	−28	19	Relegation to Regional Preferente

Updated to match(es) played on 30 April 2022. Source:
Rules for classification: 1) points; 2) head-to-head points; 3) head-to-head goal difference; 4) goal difference; 5) number of goals scored
(C) Champions; (O) Play-off winners; (P) Promoted; (R) Relegated

=== Group 4 – Basque Country ===
Teams retained from 2020–21 Tercera División

- Anaitasuna
- Aurrerá Ondarroa
- Basconia
- Beasain
- Cultural Durango
- Deusto
- Lagun Onak
- Pasaia
- San Ignacio
- Santutxu
- Tolosa
- Urduliz
- Vitoria

Teams relegated from 2020–21 Segunda División B

- Alavés B
- Barakaldo
- Leioa
- Portugalete

Teams promoted from 2020–21 División de Honor

- Amurrio
- Beti Gazte
- Uritarra

==== Teams and locations ====
Location of teams of the 2021–22 Tercera División Group 4

Team	City	Home ground
Alavés B	Vitoria-Gasteiz	Ibaia
Amurrio	Amurrio	Basarte
Anaitasuna	Azkoitia	Txerloia
Aurrerá Ondarroa	Ondarroa	Zaldupe
Barakaldo	Barakaldo	Lasesarre
Basconia	Basauri	López Cortázar
Beasain	Beasain	Loinaz
Beti Gazte	Lesaca (Navarre)	Mastegi
Cultural Durango	Durango	Tabira
Deusto	Bilbao	Etxezuri
Lagun Onak	Azpeitia	Garmendipe
Leioa	Leioa	Sarriena
Pasaia	Pasaia	Don Bosco
Portugalete	Portugalete	La Florida
San Ignacio	Vitoria-Gasteiz	Adurtzabal
Santutxu	Bilbao	Maiona
Tolosa	Tolosa	Berazubi
Urduliz	Urduliz	Iparralde
Uritarra	Larrabetzu	Errebale
Vitoria	Laudio	Ellakuri

==== League table ====
Pos	Team	Pld	W	D	L	GF	GA	GD	Pts	Qualification
1	Alavés B (C, P)	38	21	13	4	72	31	+41	76	Promotion to Segunda División RFEF
2	Beasain (O, P)	38	19	13	6	65	36	+29	70 (Note: Beasain finished ahead of Portugalete on head-to-head points: Beasain–Portugalete 2–1, Portugalete–Beasain 0–2)	Qualification for the promotion play-offs and Copa del Rey
3	Portugalete	38	19	13	6	60	33	+27	70	Qualification for the promotion play-offs
4	Barakaldo	38	20	9	9	64	46	+18	69	Qualification for the promotion play-offs
5	Basconia	38	18	11	9	45	32	+13	65	Qualification for the promotion play-offs
6	Vitoria	38	16	11	11	55	49	+6	59	
7	San Ignacio	38	17	7	14	57	48	+9	58	
8	Cultural Durango	38	13	18	7	42	29	+13	57	
9	Leioa	38	15	11	12	55	38	+17	56	
10	Anaitasuna	38	14	10	14	48	49	−1	52	
11	Lagun Onak	38	13	12	13	42	44	−2	51	
12	Pasaia	38	13	11	14	36	43	−7	50	
13	Deusto	38	11	16	11	42	40	+2	49	
14	Urduliz	38	12	9	17	39	57	−18	45	
15	Aurrerá Ondarroa	38	10	8	20	36	55	−19	38 (Note: Aurrerá Ondarroa finished ahead of Santutxu and Uritarra on head-to-head points: Aurrerá Ondarroa 9 pts, Santutxu 7 pts, Uritarra 1 pt)	
16	Santutxu (R)	38	8	14	16	42	60	−18	38	Relegation to División de Honor
17	Uritarra (R)	38	10	8	20	38	52	−14	38	Relegation to División de Honor
18	Amurrio (R)	38	8	13	17	39	45	−6	37	Relegation to División de Honor
19	Beti Gazte (R)	38	6	8	24	34	80	−46	26 (Note: Beti Gazte finished ahead of Tolosa on head-to-head points: Tolosa–Beti Gazte 1–4, Beti Gazte–Tolosa 2–2)	Relegation to División de Honor
20	Tolosa (R)	38	7	5	26	43	87	−44	26	Relegation to División de Honor

Updated to match(es) played on 30 April 2022. Source:
Rules for classification: 1) points; 2) head-to-head points; 3) head-to-head goal difference; 4) goal difference; 5) number of goals scored
(C) Champions; (O) Play-off winners; (P) Promoted; (R) Relegated

=== Group 5 – Catalonia ===
Location of teams of the 2021–22 Tercera División Group 5
Location of teams of the 2021–22 Tercera División Group 5 (Province of Barcelona)

Teams retained from 2020–21 Tercera División

- Castelldefels
- Figueres
- Girona B
- Grama
- Granollers
- Manresa
- Pobla Mafumet
- Peralada
- San Cristóbal
- Sant Andreu
- Sants
- Vilafranca
- Vilassar de Mar

Teams relegated from 2020–21 Segunda División B

- L'Hospitalet
- Olot

Teams promoted from 2020–21 Primera Catalana

- Ascó
- Guineueta

==== Teams and locations ====
Team	City	Home ground
Ascó	Ascó	Municipal d'Ascó
Castelldefels	Castelldefels	Els Canyars
Figueres	Figueres	Camp de Vilatenim
Girona B	Girona	Torres de Palau
Grama	Santa Coloma de Gramenet	Can Peixauet
Granollers	Granollers	Municipal de Granollers
Guineueta	Barcelona	CEM de la Guineueta
L'Hospitalet	L'Hospitalet de Llobregat	Municipal de l'Hospitalet de Llobregat
Manresa	Manresa	Zem del Congost
Olot	Olot	Pla de Baix
Peralada	Peralada	Municipal de Peralada
Pobla de Mafumet	La Pobla de Mafumet	Municipal de la Pobla de Mafumet
San Cristóbal	Terrassa	Ca n'Anglada
Sant Andreu	Barcelona	Narcís Sala
Sants	Barcelona	L'Energia
Vilafranca	Vilafranca del Penedès	ZEM de Vilafranca del Penedès
Vilassar de Mar	Vilassar de Mar	Xevi Ramón

==== League table ====
Pos	Team	Pld	W	D	L	GF	GA	GD	Pts	Qualification
1	Manresa (C, P)	32	17	13	2	43	21	+22	64	Promotion to Segunda División RFEF and qualification for Copa del Rey
2	Olot (O, P)	32	18	7	7	53	32	+21	61	Qualification for the promotion play-offs and Copa del Rey
3	San Cristóbal	32	16	11	5	43	25	+18	59	Qualification for the promotion play-offs
4	Girona B	32	17	7	8	38	25	+13	58	Qualification for the promotion play-offs
5	Sant Andreu	32	16	5	11	47	33	+14	53	Qualification for the promotion play-offs
6	L'Hospitalet	32	14	7	11	43	37	+6	49	
7	Pobla de Mafumet	32	12	8	12	35	26	+9	44 (Note: Pobla de Mafumet finished ahead of Vilassar de Mar on overall goal difference)	
8	Vilassar de Mar	32	11	11	10	29	24	+5	44	
9	Grama	32	12	7	13	35	31	+4	43	
10	Peralada	32	10	12	10	39	31	+8	42	
11	Vilafranca	32	10	11	11	25	33	−8	41	
12	Castelldefels	32	11	7	14	33	39	−6	40	
13	Sants	32	9	7	16	32	41	−9	34 (Note: Sants finished ahead of Granollers on head-to-head goal difference: Sants–Granollers 3–0, Granollers–Sants 1–0)	
14	Granollers (R)	32	9	7	16	32	48	−16	34	Relegation to Primera Catalana
15	Figueres (R)	32	8	8	16	29	37	−8	32	Relegation to Primera Catalana
16	Ascó (R)	32	6	7	19	23	60	−37	25	Relegation to Primera Catalana
17	Guineueta (R)	32	4	9	19	23	59	−36	21	Relegation to Primera Catalana

Updated to match(es) played on 1 May 2022. Source:
Rules for classification: 1) points; 2) head-to-head points; 3) head-to-head goal difference; 4) goal difference; 5) number of goals scored
(C) Champions; (O) Play-off winners; (P) Promoted; (R) Relegated

=== Group 6 – Valencian Community ===
Teams retained from 2020–21 Tercera División

- Acero
- Atlético Saguntino
- Benigànim
- Elche Ilicitano
- Hércules B
- Jove Español
- Olímpic Xàtiva
- Recambios Colón
- Roda
- Silla
- Torrent
- Villajoyosa
- Villarreal C

Teams relegated from 2020–21 Segunda División B

- Atzeneta
- Orihuela
- Valencia Mestalla

Teams promoted from 2020–21 Regional Preferente

- Athletic Torrellano
- Callosa Deportiva
- Castellón B

==== Teams and locations ====
Location of teams of the 2021–22 Tercera División Group 6

Team	City	Home ground
Acero	Sagunto	El Fornàs
Athletic Torrellano	Torrellano, Elche	Municipal
Atlético Saguntino	Sagunto	Morvedre
Atzeneta	Atzeneta d'Albaida	El Regit
Benigànim	Benigànim	Municipal
Callosa Deportiva	Callosa de Segura	El Palmeral
Castellón B	Castellón	Ciudad Deportiva
Elche Ilicitano	Elche	José Díaz Iborra
Hércules B	Alicante	Juan Antonio Samaranch
Jove Español	San Vicente del Raspeig	Ciudad Deportiva
Olímpic	Xàtiva	La Murta
Orihuela	Orihuela	Los Arcos
Recambios Colón	Catarroja	Sedaví
Roda	Villarreal	Pamesa Cerámica
Silla	Silla	Vicente Morera
Torrent	Torrent	San Gregorio
Valencia Mestalla	Valencia	Antonio Puchades
Villajoyosa	Villajoyosa	Nou Pla
Villarreal C	Villarreal	Pamesa Cerámica

==== League table ====
Pos	Team	Pld	W	D	L	GF	GA	GD	Pts	Qualification
1	Valencia Mestalla (C, P)	36	21	11	4	65	27	+38	74	Promotion to Segunda División RFEF
2	Atlético Saguntino (O, P)	36	17	13	6	46	30	+16	64	Qualification for the promotion play-offs and Copa del Rey
3	Atzeneta	36	18	9	9	46	25	+21	63	Qualification for the promotion play-offs
4	Acero	36	18	8	10	36	27	+9	62	Qualification for the promotion play-offs
5	Torrent	36	17	9	10	42	32	+10	60	Qualification for the promotion play-offs
6	Orihuela	36	16	10	10	50	35	+15	58	
7	Roda	36	15	11	10	34	23	+11	56	
8	Elche Ilicitano	36	13	15	8	56	29	+27	54	
9	Villarreal C	36	14	9	13	52	39	+13	51 (Note: Villarreal C finished ahead of Athletic Torrellano on head-to-head goal difference: Athletic Torrellano–Villarreal C 3–2, Villarreal C–Athletic Torrellano 3–0)	
10	Athletic Torrellano	36	13	12	11	37	37	0	51	
11	Hércules B	36	14	7	15	35	36	−1	49	
12	Silla	36	12	11	13	44	46	−2	47	
13	Castellón B	36	11	13	12	32	34	−2	46	
14	Jove Español	36	12	9	15	23	31	−8	45	
15	Olímpic (R)	36	10	10	16	29	44	−15	40	Relegation to Regional Preferente
16	Callosa Deportiva (R)	36	9	10	17	27	39	−12	37	Relegation to Regional Preferente
17	Recambios Colón (R)	36	7	10	19	22	46	−24	31	Relegation to Regional Preferente
18	Benigànim (R)	36	6	7	23	32	78	−46	25	Relegation to Regional Preferente
19	Villajoyosa (R)	36	5	4	27	14	64	−50	19	Relegation to Regional Preferente

Updated to match(es) played on 1 May 2022. Source:
Rules for classification: 1) points; 2) head-to-head points; 3) head-to-head goal difference; 4) goal difference; 5) number of goals scored
(C) Champions; (O) Play-off winners; (P) Promoted; (R) Relegated

=== Group 7 – Community of Madrid ===
Teams retained from 2020–21 Tercera División

- Alcalá
- Alcorcón B
- Carabanchel
- Complutense
- Fuenlabrada Promesas (in the place of Flat Earth)
- Moratalaz
- Paracuellos Antamira
- Parla
- Pozuelo de Alarcón
- Rayo Vallecano B
- Torrejón
- Trival Valderas
- Villaverde San Andrés

Teams relegated from 2020–21 Segunda División B

- Atlético Madrid B
- Getafe B
- Las Rozas

Teams promoted from 2020–21 Preferente de Madrid

- Galapagar
- Moscardó
- Tres Cantos
- Ursaria
- Villaviciosa de Odón

==== Teams and locations ====
Location of teams of the 2021–22 Tercera División Group 7

Team	City	Home ground
Alcalá	Alcalá de Henares	Municipal del Val
Alcorcón B	Alcorcón	Anexo de Santo Domingo
Atlético Madrid B	Madrid	Cerro del Espino
Carabanchel	Madrid	La Mina
Complutense	Alcalá de Henares	Recinto Ferial
Fuenlabrada Promesas	Fuenlabrada	La Aldehuela
Galapagar	Galapagar	El Chopo
Getafe B	Getafe	Ciudad Deportiva
Las Rozas	Las Rozas	Dehesa de Navalcarbón
Moratalaz	Madrid	La Dehesa
Moscardó	Madrid	Román Valero
Paracuellos Antamira	Paracuellos de Jarama	Polideportivo
Parla	Parla	Los Prados
Pozuelo de Alarcón	Pozuelo de Alarcón	Valle de las Cañas
Rayo Vallecano B	Madrid	Ciudad Deportiva
Torrejón	Torrejón de Ardoz	Las Veredillas
Tres Cantos	Tres Cantos	La Foresta
Trival Valderas	Alcorcón	La Canaleja
Ursaria	Madrid	Municipal San Blas
Villaverde San Andrés	Madrid	Boetticher
Villaviciosa de Odón	Villaviciosa de Odón	Nuevo Municipal

==== League table ====
Pos	Team	Pld	W	D	L	GF	GA	GD	Pts	Qualification
1	Atlético Madrid B (C, P)	40	29	8	3	82	26	+56	95	Promotion to Segunda División RFEF
2	Las Rozas	40	22	9	9	68	35	+33	75	Qualification for the promotion play-offs and Copa del Rey
3	Fuenlabrada Promesas	40	20	12	8	61	42	+19	72	Qualification for the promotion play-offs
4	Alcorcón B (O, P)	40	19	12	9	63	39	+24	69	Qualification for the promotion play-offs
5	Paracuellos Antamira	40	19	9	12	56	44	+12	66	Qualification for the promotion play-offs
6	Ursaria	40	16	16	8	47	27	+20	64 (Note: Ursaria finished ahead of Alcalá on head-to-head goal difference: Ursaria–Alcalá 2–0, Alcalá–Ursaria 2–1)	
7	Alcalá	40	18	10	12	45	40	+5	64	
8	Getafe B	40	17	10	13	56	46	+10	61	
9	Rayo Vallecano B	40	15	12	13	59	43	+16	57 (Note: Rayo Vallecano B finished ahead of Torrejón and Pozuelo de Alarcón on head-to-head points: Rayo Vallecano B 7 pts, Torrejón 6 pts, Pozuelo de Alarcón 4 pts)	
10	Torrejón	40	16	9	15	55	48	+7	57	
11	Pozuelo de Alarcón	40	15	12	13	39	45	−6	57	
12	Galapagar	40	16	8	16	50	57	−7	56	
13	Trival Valderas	40	13	14	13	40	42	−2	53	
14	Parla	40	14	10	16	46	46	0	52	
15	Tres Cantos (R)	40	13	8	19	41	52	−11	47	Relegation to Preferente de Madrid
16	Villaverde San Andrés (R)	40	13	6	21	35	45	−10	45	Relegation to Preferente de Madrid
17	Moratalaz (R)	40	12	7	21	46	73	−27	43	Relegation to Preferente de Madrid
18	Villaviciosa de Odón (R)	40	10	8	22	47	73	−26	38	Relegation to Preferente de Madrid
19	Complutense (R)	40	9	10	21	31	58	−27	37	Relegation to Preferente de Madrid
20	Carabanchel (R)	40	7	12	21	42	69	−27	33	Relegation to Preferente de Madrid
21	Moscardó (R)	40	5	2	33	20	79	−59	17	Relegation to Preferente de Madrid

Updated to match(es) played on 1 May 2022. Source:
Rules for classification: 1) points; 2) head-to-head points; 3) head-to-head goal difference; 4) goal difference; 5) number of goals scored
(C) Champions; (O) Play-off winners; (P) Promoted; (R) Relegated

=== Group 8 – Castile and León ===
Teams retained from 2020–21 Tercera División

- Almazán
- Arandina
- Atlético Astorga
- Atlético Bembibre
- Atlético Tordesillas
- Ávila
- Colegios Diocesanos
- Júpiter Leonés
- La Virgen del Camino
- Mirandés B
- Numancia B
- Salamanca B
- Santa Marta

Teams relegated from 2020–21 Segunda División B

- Guijuelo

Teams promoted from 2020–21 Primera Regional

- Ciudad Rodrigo
- Palencia
- Ribert

==== Teams and locations ====
Location of teams of the 2021–22 Tercera División Group 8

Team	City	Home ground
Almazán	Almazán	La Arboleda
Arandina	Aranda de Duero	El Montecillo
Atlético Astorga	Astorga	La Eragudina
Atlético Bembibre	Bembibre	La Devesa
Atlético Tordesillas	Tordesillas	Las Salinas
Ávila	Ávila	Adolfo Suárez
Colegios Diocesanos	Ávila	Sancti Spiritu
Ciudad Rodrigo	Ciudad Rodrigo	Francisco Mateos
Guijuelo	Guijuelo	Luis Ramos
Júpiter Leonés	León	Puente Castro
La Virgen del Camino	La Virgen del Camino, Valverde de la Virgen	Los Dominicos
Mirandés B	Miranda de Ebro	Ence
Numancia B	Soria	Francisco Rubio
Palencia	Palencia	Nueva Balastera
Ribert	Salamanca	Pistas del Helmántico
Salamanca UDS B	Salamanca	Pistas del Helmántico
Santa Marta	Santa Marta de Tormes	Alfonso San Casto

==== League table ====
Pos	Team	Pld	W	D	L	GF	GA	GD	Pts	Qualification
1	Guijuelo (C, P)	32	22	9	1	61	16	+45	75	Promotion to Segunda División RFEF and qualification for Copa del Rey
2	Almazán	32	20	4	8	51	28	+23	64	Qualification for the promotion play-offs and Copa del Rey
3	Ávila	32	17	7	8	45	25	+20	58	Qualification for the promotion play-offs
4	Mirandés B	32	15	10	7	36	24	+12	55	Qualification for the promotion play-offs
5	Atlético Tordesillas (O)	32	15	9	8	37	28	+9	54 (Note: Atlético Tordesillas finished ahead of Júpiter Leonés on head-to-head points: Atlético Tordesillas–Júpiter Leonés 1–1, Júpiter Leonés–Atlético Tordesillas 0–2)	Qualification for the promotion play-offs
6	Júpiter Leonés	32	15	9	8	55	37	+18	54	
7	Arandina	32	15	8	9	39	22	+17	53	
8	Palencia	32	14	5	13	45	36	+9	47	
9	Atlético Astorga	32	12	6	14	33	37	−4	42	
10	Atlético Bembibre	32	11	7	14	32	40	−8	40	
11	La Virgen del Camino	32	10	9	13	28	34	−6	39	
12	Numancia B	32	9	9	14	40	48	−8	36	
13	Santa Marta	32	10	5	17	37	49	−12	35	
14	Ribert (R)	32	7	11	14	34	49	−15	32	Relegation to Primera Regional
15	Salamanca UDS B (R)	32	8	6	18	22	51	−29	30	Relegation to Primera Regional
16	Ciudad Rodrigo (R)	32	5	5	22	29	65	−36	20	Relegation to Primera Regional
17	Colegios Diocesanos (R)	32	4	7	21	21	56	−35	19	Relegation to Primera Regional

Updated to match(es) played on 30 April 2022. Source:
Rules for classification: 1) points; 2) head-to-head points; 3) head-to-head goal difference; 4) goal difference; 5) number of goals scored
(C) Champions; (O) Play-off winners; (P) Promoted; (R) Relegated

=== Group 9 – Eastern Andalusia and Melilla ===
Location of teams of the 2021–22 Tercera División Group 9
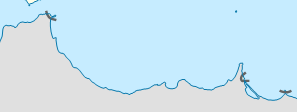
Location of teams of the 2021–22 Tercera División Group 9 – Melilla

Teams retained from 2020–21 Tercera División

- Alhaurín de la Torre
- Alhaurino
- Almería B
- Atlético Malagueño
- Atlético Porcuna
- Ciudad de Torredonjimeno
- El Palo
- Huétor Tájar
- Huétor Vega
- Jaén
- Juventud Torremolinos
- Motril
- Torreperogil

Teams relegated from 2020–21 Segunda División B

- Marbella

Teams promoted from 2020–21 División de Honor

- San Pedro
- Torre del Mar

Teams promoted from 2020–21 Preferente de Melilla

- Intergym Melilla

==== Teams and locations ====
Team	City	Home ground
Alhaurín de la Torre	Alhaurín de la Torre	Los Manantiales
Alhaurino	Alhaurín El Grande	Miguel Fijones
Almería B	Almería	Estadio de los Juegos Mediterráneos
Atlético Malagueño	Málaga	El Viso
Atlético Porcuna	Porcuna	San Benito
Ciudad de Torredonjimeno	Torredonjimeno	Matías Prats
El Palo	Málaga	San Ignacio
Huétor Tájar	Huétor-Tájar	Miguel Moranto
Huétor Vega	Huétor Vega	Las Viñas
Intergym Melilla	Melilla	La Espiguera
Jaén	Jaén	La Victoria
Juventud Torremolinos	Torremolinos	El Pozuelo
Marbella	Marbella	Municipal de Marbella
Motril	Motril	Escribano Castilla
San Pedro	San Pedro de Alcántara	Municipal
Torre del Mar	Torre del Mar	Juan Manuel Azuaga
Torreperogil	Torreperogil	Abdón Martínez Fariñas

==== League table ====
Pos	Team	Pld	W	D	L	GF	GA	GD	Pts	Qualification
1	Juventud Torremolinos (C, P, Q)	32	17	12	3	45	21	+24	63	Promotion to Segunda División RFEF and Qualification for Copa del Rey
2	Huétor Tájar	32	16	10	6	56	30	+26	58 (Note: Huétor Tájar finished ahead of Marbella on head-to-head points: Marbella–Huétor Tájar 0–1, Huétor Tájar–Marbella 3–2)	Qualification for the promotion play-offs
3	Marbella (Note: Marbella was awarded a 0–3 win in their Round 17 match against Alhaurín de la Torre after the latter fielded an ineligible player. The match originally ended 0–0.)	32	18	4	10	53	26	+27	58	Qualification for the promotion play-offs
4	Almería B	32	16	9	7	59	31	+28	57 (Note: Almería B finished ahead of Atlético Malagueño on head-to-head goal difference: Atlético Malagueño–Almería B 1–0, Almería B–Atlético Malagueño 2–0)	Qualification for the promotion play-offs
5	Atlético Malagueño	32	17	6	9	51	38	+13	57	Qualification for the promotion play-offs
6	Motril (Note: Motril was awarded a 0–3 win in their Round 2 match against Jaén after the latter failed to show up to the match. Jaén was subsequently deducted three points.)	32	17	5	10	59	37	+22	56	
7	Ciudad de Torredonjimeno	32	14	13	5	55	35	+20	55	
8	Torre del Mar	32	14	7	11	52	40	+12	49	
9	Atlético Porcuna	32	11	9	12	42	47	−5	42	
10	El Palo	32	11	8	13	40	40	0	41	
11	Huétor Vega	32	9	12	11	33	38	−5	39	
12	Torreperogil	32	10	8	14	28	36	−8	38	
13	Jaén	32	9	12	11	31	43	−12	36	
14	Alhaurín de la Torre (R)	32	9	7	16	28	49	−21	34	Relegation to División de Honor
15	San Pedro (R)	32	7	7	18	26	48	−22	28	Relegation to División de Honor
16	Alhaurino (R)	32	6	9	17	40	53	−13	27	Relegation to División de Honor
17	Intergym Melilla (R)	32	0	4	28	13	99	−86	4	Relegation to División de Honor

Updated to match(es) played on 24 April 2022. Source:
Rules for classification: 1) points; 2) head-to-head points; 3) head-to-head goal difference; 4) goal difference; 5) number of goals scored
(C) Champions; (P) Promoted; (Q) Qualified for the phase indicated; (R) Relegated

=== Group 10 – Western Andalusia and Ceuta ===
Teams retained from 2020–21 Tercera División

- Atlético Antoniano
- Cabecense
- Ciudad de Lucena
- Conil
- Córdoba B
- Gerena
- Los Barrios
- Pozoblanco
- Puente Genil
- Rota
- Sevilla C
- Utrera
- Xerez

Teams relegated from 2020–21 Segunda División B

- Recreativo

Teams promoted from 2020–21 División de Honor

- Cartaya
- Tomares

Teams promoted from 2020–21 Preferente de Ceuta

- Ceuta B

==== Teams and locations ====
Location of teams of the 2021–22 Tercera División Group 10

Team	City	Home ground
Atlético Antoniano	Lebrija	Municipal
Cabecense	Las Cabezas de San Juan	Carlos Marchena
Cartaya	Cartaya	Luis Rodríguez Salvador
Ceuta B	Ceuta	Alfonso Murube
Ciudad de Lucena	Lucena	Ciudad de Lucena
Conil	Conil de la Frontera	José Antonio Pérez Ureba
Córdoba B	Córdoba	Rafael Gómez
Gerena	Gerena	José Juan Romero Gil
Los Barrios	Los Barrios	San Rafael
Pozoblanco	Pozoblanco	Municipal
Puente Genil	Puente Genil	Manuel Polinario
Recreativo	Huelva	Nuevo Colombino
Rota	Rota	Alcalde Navarro Flores
Sevilla C	Seville	José Ramón Cisneros Palacios
Tomares	Tomares	Municipal San Sebastián
Utrera	Utrera	San Juan Bosco
Xerez	Jerez de la Frontera	La Juventud

==== League table ====
Pos	Team	Pld	W	D	L	GF	GA	GD	Pts	Qualification
1	Recreativo (C, P, Q)	32	24	5	3	57	20	+37	77	Promotion to Segunda División RFEF and Qualification for Copa del Rey
2	Utrera (P)	32	20	7	5	59	26	+33	67	Qualification for the promotion play-offs
3	Xerez	32	18	8	6	50	24	+26	62	Qualification for the promotion play-offs
4	Ciudad de Lucena	32	18	6	8	45	25	+20	60	Qualification for the promotion play-offs
5	Gerena	32	18	4	10	53	31	+22	58 (Note: Gerena finished ahead of Córdoba B on overall goal difference)	Qualification for the promotion play-offs
6	Córdoba B	32	17	7	8	54	33	+21	58	
7	Puente Genil	32	13	6	13	36	41	−5	45	
8	Sevilla C	32	13	4	15	40	48	−8	43	
9	Ceuta B	32	9	10	13	26	39	−13	37	
10	Conil	32	10	6	16	30	49	−19	36 (Note: Conil finished ahead of Rota on head-to-head goal difference: Rota–Conil 2–1, Conil–Rota 3–1)	
11	Rota	32	9	9	14	31	45	−14	36	
12	Pozoblanco	32	8	10	14	37	49	−12	34 (Note: Pozoblanco finished ahead of Atlético Antoniano on head-to-head points: Atlético Antoniano–Pozoblanco 1–1, Pozoblanco–Atlético Antoniano 2–0)	
13	Atlético Antoniano	32	8	10	14	29	35	−6	34	
14	Cartaya	32	8	9	15	26	30	−4	33	
15	Tomares (R)	32	9	4	19	27	46	−19	31	Relegation to División de Honor
16	Cabecense (R)	32	6	5	21	25	51	−26	23 (Note: Cabecense finished ahead of Los Barrios on head-to-head goal difference: Los Barrios–Cabecense 3–1, Cabecense–Los Barrios 3–0)	Relegation to División de Honor
17	Los Barrios (R)	32	5	8	19	26	59	−33	23	Relegation to División de Honor

Updated to match(es) played on 24 April 2022. Source:
Rules for classification: 1) points; 2) head-to-head points; 3) head-to-head goal difference; 4) goal difference; 5) number of goals scored
(C) Champions; (P) Promoted; (Q) Qualified for the phase indicated; (R) Relegated

=== Group 11 – Balearic Islands ===
Teams retained from 2020–21 Tercera División

- Binissalem
- Collerense
- Constància
- Felanitx
- Llosetense
- Mallorca B
- Manacor
- Platges de Calvià
- Portmany
- Sant Jordi
- Sant Rafel
- Santanyí
- Sóller

Teams relegated from 2020–21 Segunda División B

- Poblense

Teams promoted from 2020–21 Regional

- Campos
- Inter Ibiza
- Mercadal
- Murense
- Rotlet Molinar
- Serverense
- Son Verí

==== Teams and locations ====
Location of teams of the 2021–22 Tercera División Group 11

Team	City	Home ground
Binissalem	Binissalem	Miquel Pons
Campos	Campos	Municipal
Collerense	Es Coll d'en Rabassa, Palma	Ca Na Paulina
Constància	Inca	Municipal
Felanitx	Felanitx	Es Torrentó
Inter Ibiza	Ibiza	Can Cantó
Llosetense	Lloseta	Municipal
Mallorca B	Palma	Son Bibiloni
Manacor	Manacor	Na Capellera
Mercadal	Es Mercadal	San Martí
Murense	Muro	Municipal
Platges de Calvià	Magaluf, Calvià	Municipal de Magaluf
Poblense	Sa Pobla	Nou Camp
Portmany	Sant Antoni de Portmany	Sant Antoni
Rotlet Molinar	Palma	Rotlet Molinar
Sant Jordi	Sant Jordi de ses Salines, Sant Josep de sa Talaia	Kiko Serra
Sant Rafel	Sant Rafel de sa Creu, Sant Antoni de Portmany	Municipal
Santanyí	Santanyí	Municipal
Serverense	Son Servera	Ses Eres
Sóller	Sóller	En Maiol
Son Verí	Llucmajor	Municipal s'Arenal

==== League table ====
Pos	Team	Pld	W	D	L	GF	GA	GD	Pts	Qualification
1	Mallorca B (C, P)	40	32	5	3	105	27	+78	101	Promotion to Segunda División RFEF
2	Manacor	40	26	4	10	74	42	+32	82	Qualification for the promotion play-offs and qualification for Copa del Rey
3	Poblense	40	24	8	8	89	24	+65	80	Qualification for the promotion play-offs
4	Platges de Calvià	40	22	11	7	56	27	+29	77	Qualification for the promotion play-offs
5	Llosetense	40	22	9	9	62	36	+26	75 (Note: Llosetense finished ahead of Santanyí on overall goal difference)	Qualification for the promotion play-offs
6	Santanyí	40	23	6	11	66	46	+20	75	
7	Constància	40	20	9	11	54	38	+16	69	
8	Sant Jordi	40	20	8	12	57	46	+11	68	
9	Portmany	40	17	11	12	55	51	+4	62	
10	Collerense	40	17	7	16	45	49	−4	58	
11	Sóller	40	16	9	15	46	52	−6	57	
12	Binissalem	40	13	12	15	40	44	−4	51	
13	Mercadal	40	11	12	17	54	51	+3	45	
14	Inter Ibiza (Note: Relegated due to relegation of Andratx from Segunda División RFEF) (R)	40	12	7	21	51	62	−11	43	Relegation to Regional
15	Rotlet Molinar (R)	40	11	9	20	35	53	−18	42	Relegation to Regional
16	Sant Rafel (R)	40	10	10	20	48	64	−16	40 (Note: Sant Rafel finished ahead of Campos on overall goal difference)	Relegation to Regional
17	Campos (R)	40	10	10	20	38	64	−26	40	Relegation to Regional
18	Felanitx (R)	40	9	11	20	43	65	−22	38	Relegation to Regional
19	Serverense (R)	40	8	7	25	35	74	−39	31	Relegation to Regional
20	Murense (R)	40	5	8	27	31	76	−45	23	Relegation to Regional
21	Son Verí (R)	40	4	3	33	28	121	−93	15	Relegation to Regional

Updated to match(es) played on 1 May 2022. Source:
Rules for classification: 1) points; 2) head-to-head points; 3) head-to-head goal difference; 4) goal difference; 5) number of goals scored
(C) Champions; (P) Promoted; (R) Relegated

=== Group 12 – Canary Islands ===
Teams retained from 2020–21 Tercera División

- Arucas
- Atlético Paso
- Buzanada
- Gran Tarajal
- La Cuadra
- Lanzarote
- Las Palmas C
- Santa Úrsula
- Tenerife B
- Tenisca
- Unión Viera
- Vera
- Villa de Santa Brígida

Teams relegated from 2020–21 Segunda División B

- Marino

Teams promoted from 2020–21 Interinsular Preferente

- Herbania
- Las Zocas
- Unión Sur Yaiza

==== Teams and locations ====
Location of teams of the 2021–22 Tercera División Group 12

Team	City	Home ground
Arucas	Arucas	Tonono
Atlético Paso	El Paso	Municipal
Buzanada	Buzanada, Arona	Clementina de Bello
Gran Tarajal	Tuineje	Municipal
Herbania	Puerto del Rosario	Municipal de Los Pozos
La Cuadra	Puerto del Rosario	Municipal de Los Pozos
Lanzarote	Arrecife	Ciudad Deportiva
Las Palmas C	Las Palmas	Anexo Gran Canaria
Las Zocas	San Miguel de Abona	Juanito Marrero
Marino	Los Cristianos, Arona	Antonio Domínguez Alfonso
Santa Úrsula	Santa Úrsula	Argelio Tabares
Tenerife B	Santa Cruz de Tenerife	Centro Insular
Tenisca	Santa Cruz de La Palma	Virgen de las Nieves
Unión Sur Yaiza	Yaiza	Municipal
Unión Viera	Las Palmas	Alfonso Silva
Vera	Puerto de la Cruz	Salvador Ledesma
Villa de Santa Brígida	Santa Brígida	El Guiniguada

==== League table ====
Pos	Team	Pld	W	D	L	GF	GA	GD	Pts	Qualification
1	Atlético Paso (C, P)	32	17	8	7	44	27	+17	59	Promotion to Segunda División RFEF and Qualification for Copa del Rey
2	Las Palmas C (Note: Las Palmas C was relegated due to Las Palmas Atlético's relegation from Segunda División RFEF) (E, R)	32	18	4	10	47	30	+17	58	Relegation to Interinsular Preferente
3	Tenerife B (Q)	32	17	6	9	49	31	+18	57	Qualification for the promotion play-offs
4	Arucas (E)	32	17	5	10	44	30	+14	56	Qualification for the promotion play-offs
5	Villa de Santa Brígida (E)	32	14	6	12	45	37	+8	48	Qualification for the promotion play-offs
6	Unión Sur Yaiza	32	15	2	15	42	43	−1	47 (Note: Unión Sur Yaiza finished ahead of Gran Tarajal on head-to-head points: Unión Sur Yaiza–Gran Tarajal 5–3, Gran Tarajal–Unión Sur Yaiza 1–1)	
7	Gran Tarajal	32	13	8	11	46	40	+6	47	
8	Santa Úrsula	32	13	7	12	35	37	−2	46 (Note: Santa Úrsula finished ahead of La Cuadra on head-to-head points: Santa Úrsula–La Cuadra 1–0, La Cuadra–Santa Úrsula 0–0)	
9	La Cuadra	32	12	10	10	46	35	+11	46	
10	Marino	32	14	3	15	37	30	+7	45	
11	Lanzarote	32	11	11	10	28	24	+4	44 (Note: Lanzarote finished ahead of Buzanada on overall goal difference)	
12	Buzanada	32	13	5	14	35	33	+2	44	
13	Herbania (Note: Relegated due to relegations of regional teams from Segunda División RFEF) (R)	32	12	7	13	27	33	−6	43	Relegation to Interinsular Preferente
14	Tenisca (R)	32	10	10	12	37	45	−8	40 (Note: Tenisca finished ahead of Vera on head-to-head points: Tenisca–Vera 1–0, Vera–Tenisca 0–1)	Relegation to Interinsular Preferente
15	Vera (R)	32	12	4	16	27	37	−10	40	Relegation to Interinsular Preferente
16	Unión Viera (R)	32	8	6	18	24	51	−27	30	Relegation to Interinsular Preferente
17	Las Zocas (R)	32	3	4	25	14	64	−50	13	Relegation to Interinsular Preferente

Updated to match(es) played on 1 May 2022. Source:
Rules for classification: 1) points; 2) head-to-head points; 3) head-to-head goal difference; 4) goal difference; 5) number of goals scored
(C) Champions; (E) Eliminated; (P) Promoted; (Q) Qualified for the phase indicated; (R) Relegated

=== Group 13 – Region of Murcia ===
Teams retained from 2020–21 Tercera División

- Bullense
- Cartagena B
- Cartagena FC
- Ciudad de Murcia
- El Palmar
- Huércal-Overa
- La Unión Atlético
- Los Garres
- Mazarrón
- Minera
- Murcia Imperial
- Racing Murcia
- UCAM Murcia B

Teams relegated from 2020–21 Segunda División B

- Lorca Deportiva
- Yeclano

Teams promoted from 2020–21 Preferente Autonómica

- Archena Sport
- Bala Azul
- Caravaca

==== Teams and locations ====
Location of teams of the 2020–21 Tercera División Group 13

Team	City	Home ground
Archena Sport	Archena	La Hoya
Bala Azul	Mazarrón	Playa Sol
Bullense	Bullas	Nicolás de las Peñas
Caravaca	Caravaca de la Cruz	El Morao
Cartagena B	Cartagena	Ciudad Jardín
Cartagena FC	Cartagena	Gómez Meseguer
Ciudad de Murcia	Murcia	José Barnés
El Palmar	El Palmar, Murcia	Municipal
Huércal-Overa	Huércal-Overa (Andalusia)	El Hornillo
La Unión	La Unión	Municipal
Lorca Deportiva	Lorca	Francisco Artés Carrasco
Los Garres	Murcia	Las Tejeras
Mazarrón	Mazarrón	Municipal
Minera	Llano del Beal, Cartagena	Ángel Cedrán
Murcia Imperial	Murcia	Campus Universitario
Racing Murcia	Dolores de Pacheco, Torre-Pacheco	Polideportivo Municipal
UCAM Murcia B	Sangonera la Verde	El Mayayo
Yeclano	Yecla	La Constitución

==== League table ====
Pos	Team	Pld	W	D	L	GF	GA	GD	Pts	Qualification
1	Yeclano (C, P, Q)	34	24	8	2	71	21	+50	80	Promotion to Segunda División RFEF and Qualification for Copa del Rey
2	Cartagena B (Q)	34	17	9	8	61	32	+29	60	Qualification for the promotion play-offs
3	Racing Murcia (E)	34	15	12	7	48	27	+21	57	Qualification for the promotion play-offs
4	UCAM Murcia B (E)	34	15	9	10	49	34	+15	54 (Note: UCAM Murcia B finished ahead of La Unión Atlético on head-to-head points: UCAM Murcia B–La Unión Atlético 1–0, La Unión Atlético–UCAM Murcia B 0–0)	Qualification for the promotion play-offs
5	La Unión Atlético (E)	34	15	9	10	44	31	+13	54	Qualification for the promotion play-offs
6	Lorca Deportiva (Note: Lorca Deportiva deducted two points for failing to pay referees's wages three times during the season.)	34	15	10	9	52	42	+10	53	
7	Murcia Imperial	34	14	9	11	49	46	+3	51	
8	Caravaca	34	13	11	10	44	40	+4	50	
9	Ciudad de Murcia	34	13	8	13	47	45	+2	47	
10	Bullense	34	12	7	15	33	49	−16	43 (Note: Bullense finished ahead of El Palmar and Archena Sport on head-to-head points: Bullense 7 pts, El Palmar 6 pts, Archena Sport 4 pts)	
11	El Palmar	34	11	10	13	41	44	−3	43	
12	Archena Sport (Note: Archena Sport awarded a 3–0 win after their Round 1 match vs Mazarrón after the latter fielded an ineligible player. The match originally ended 1–1)	34	12	7	15	48	49	−1	43	
13	Minera	34	12	6	16	39	51	−12	42	
14	Bala Azul	34	10	10	14	30	45	−15	40	
15	Cartagena FC (R)	34	10	8	16	35	49	−14	38	Relegation to Preferente Autonómica
16	Mazarrón (R)	34	10	7	17	33	48	−15	37	Relegation to Preferente Autonómica
17	Huércal-Overa (R)	34	5	10	19	26	54	−28	25	Relegation to Preferente Autonómica
18	Los Garres (R)	34	4	8	22	23	66	−43	20	Relegation to Preferente Autonómica

Updated to match(es) played on 1 May 2022. Source:
Rules for classification: 1) points; 2) head-to-head points; 3) head-to-head goal difference; 4) goal difference; 5) number of goals scored
(C) Champions; (E) Eliminated; (P) Promoted; (Q) Qualified for the phase indicated; (R) Relegated

=== Group 14 – Extremadura ===
Teams retained from 2020–21 Tercera División

- Aceuchal
- Arroyo
- Azuaga
- Calamonte
- Diocesano
- Extremadura B
- Jerez
- Llerenense
- Miajadas
- Moralo
- Olivenza
- Plasencia
- Trujillo

Teams promoted from Regional Preferente

- Badajoz B
- Don Álvaro
- Villafranca

==== Teams and locations ====
Location of teams of the 2021–22 Tercera División Group 14

Team	City	Home ground
Aceuchal	Aceuchal	Municipal
Arroyo	Arroyo de la Luz	Municipal
Azuaga	Azuaga	Municipal
Badajoz B	Badajoz	Nuevo Vivero
Calamonte	Calamonte	Municipal
Diocesano	Cáceres	Campos de la Federación
Don Álvaro	Don Álvaro	Manuel Barrero Pedro Macias
Extremadura B	Almendralejo	Tomás de la Hera
Jerez	Jerez de los Caballeros	Manuel Calzado Galván
Llerenense	Llerena	Fernando Robina
Miajadas	Miajadas	Municipal
Moralo	Navalmoral de la Mata	Municipal
Olivenza	Olivenza	Municipal
Plasencia	Plasencia	Ciudad Deportiva
Trujillo	Trujillo	Julián García de Guadiana
Villafranca	Villafranca de los Barros	Municipal

==== League table ====
Pos	Team	Pld	W	D	L	GF	GA	GD	Pts	Qualification
1	Diocesano (Note: Diocesano awarded a 3–0 win over Extremadura B after the latter failed to show up in their Round 21 match. Extremadura B was subsequently deducted three points.) (C, P, Q)	30	20	3	7	61	30	+31	63	Promotion to Segunda División RFEF and Qualification for Copa del Rey
2	Moralo	30	14	10	6	39	19	+20	52	Qualification for the promotion play-offs
3	Llerenense (Note: Llerenense awarded a 0–3 win over Extremadura B after the latter failed to show up in their Round 20 match. Extremadura B was subsequently deducted three points.)	30	13	12	5	44	32	+12	51	Qualification for the promotion play-offs
4	Jerez	30	14	7	9	38	30	+8	49	Qualification for the promotion play-offs
5	Arroyo	30	12	12	6	40	30	+10	48 (Note: Arroyo finished ahead of Trujillo and Azuaga on head-to-head points: Arroyo 8 pts, Trujillo 5 pts, Azuaga 2 pts)	Qualification for the promotion play-offs
6	Trujillo	30	12	12	6	40	27	+13	48	
7	Azuaga	30	12	12	6	41	31	+10	48	
8	Calamonte	30	11	10	9	35	33	+2	43	
9	Plasencia	30	10	8	12	24	29	−5	38	
10	Villafranca	30	9	10	11	27	30	−3	37	
11	Olivenza	30	7	12	11	31	35	−4	33	
12	Don Álvaro	30	7	10	13	36	44	−8	31	
13	Miajadas	30	8	5	17	30	48	−18	29 (Note: Miajadas finished ahead of Aceuchal on head-to-head goal difference: Aceuchal–Miajadas 0–4, Miajas–Aceuchal 1–3)	
14	Aceuchal (R)	30	7	8	15	24	42	−18	29	Relegation to Regional Preferente
15	Badajoz B (R)	30	6	9	15	24	38	−14	27	Relegation to Regional Preferente
16	Extremadura B (Note: Extremadura B was expelled from the competition in Round 21 after two no-shows. All subsequent matches awarded 0–2 to their opponents.) (D)	30	6	4	20	18	54	−36	0	Relegation to Regional Preferente

Updated to match(es) played on 24 April 2022. Source:
Rules for classification: 1) points; 2) head-to-head points; 3) head-to-head goal difference; 4) goal difference; 5) number of goals scored
(C) Champions; (D) Disqualified; (P) Promoted; (Q) Qualified for the phase indicated; (R) Relegated

=== Group 15 – Navarre ===
Location of teams of the 2020–21 Tercera División Group 15

Teams retained from 2020–21 Tercera División

- Atlético Cirbonero
- Beti Kozkor
- Beti Onak
- Burladés
- Cantolagua
- Corellano
- Cortes
- Valle de Egüés
- Huarte
- Murchante
- Pamplona
- Subiza
- Txantrea

Teams promoted from 2020–21 Primera Autonómica

- Avance
- Azkoyen
- Gares

==== Teams and locations ====
Team	City	Home ground
Atlético Cirbonero	Cintruénigo	San Juan
Avance	Ezcabarte	Igueldea
Azkoyen	Peralta	Las Luchas
Beti Kozkor	Lekunberri	Plazaola
Beti Onak	Villava	Lorenzo Goikoa
Burladés	Burlada	Ripagaina
Cantolagua	Sangüesa	Cantolagua
Corellano	Corella	José Luis de Arrese
Cortes	Cortes	San Francisco Javier
Gares	Puente la Reina	Osabidea
Huarte	Huarte/Uharte	Areta
Murchante	Murchante	San Roque
Pamplona	Pamplona	Bidezarra
Subiza	Subiza	Sotoburu
Txantrea	Pamplona	Txantrea
Valle de Egüés	Egüés	Sarriguren

==== League table ====
Pos	Team	Pld	W	D	L	GF	GA	GD	Pts	Qualification
1	Atlético Cirbonero (C, P, Q)	30	20	9	1	50	12	+38	69	Promotion to Segunda División RFEF and Qualification for Copa del Rey
2	Subiza (E)	30	20	4	6	62	24	+38	64	Qualification for the promotion play-offs
3	Txantrea (Q)	30	16	7	7	46	26	+20	55	Qualification for the promotion play-offs
4	Huarte (E)	30	14	9	7	58	40	+18	51	Qualification for the promotion play-offs
5	Cantolagua (E)	30	14	8	8	49	33	+16	50	Qualification for the promotion play-offs
6	Cortes	30	14	6	10	39	24	+15	48	
7	Beti Onak	30	12	8	10	37	30	+7	44	
8	Avance	30	10	10	10	41	39	+2	40	
9	Pamplona (Note: Pamplona awarded a 3–0 win in their Round 15 match against Azkoyen after the latter fielded an ineligible player. The match originally ended 1–1.)	30	11	5	14	24	30	−6	38	
10	Azkoyen	30	10	7	13	32	51	−19	37 (Note: Azkoyen finished ahead of Valle de Egüés on head-to-head goal difference: Valle de Egüés–Azkoyen 2–1, Azkoyen–Valle de Egüés 2–0)	
11	Valle de Egüés	30	11	4	15	38	49	−11	37	
12	Burladés	30	8	9	13	35	39	−4	33	
13	Murchante	30	9	5	16	29	50	−21	32	
14	Beti Kozkor (R)	30	8	4	18	20	41	−21	28	Relegation to Primera Autonómica
15	Corellano (R)	30	6	5	19	27	52	−25	23	Relegation to Primera Autonómica
16	Gares (R)	30	4	6	20	20	67	−47	18	Relegation to Primera Autonómica

Updated to match(es) played on 30 April 2022. Source:
Rules for classification: 1) points; 2) head-to-head points; 3) head-to-head goal difference; 4) goal difference; 5) number of goals scored
(C) Champions; (E) Eliminated; (P) Promoted; (Q) Qualified for the phase indicated; (R) Relegated

=== Group 16 – La Rioja ===
Teams retained from 2020–21 Tercera División

- Agoncillo
- Alfaro
- Anguiano
- Arnedo
- Atlético Vianés
- Berceo
- Calahorra B
- Casalarreina
- La Calzada
- Oyonesa
- River Ebro
- Varea
- Yagüe

Teams relegated from 2020–21 Segunda División B

- Haro

Teams promoted from 2020–21 Regional Preferente

- Cenicero
- Rápid

==== Teams and locations ====
Location of teams of the 2021–22 Tercera División Group 16

Team	City	Home ground
Agoncillo	Agoncillo	San Roque
Alfaro	Alfaro	La Molineta
Anguiano	Anguiano	Isla
Arnedo	Arnedo	Sendero
Atlético Vianés	Viana (Navarre)	Municipal
Berceo	Logroño	La Isla
Calahorra B	Calahorra	La Planilla
Casalarreina	Casalarreina	El Soto
Cenicero	Cenicero	Las Viñas
Haro	Haro	El Mazo
La Calzada	Santo Domingo de La Calzada	El Rollo
Oyonesa	Oyón (Basque Country)	El Espinar
Rápid	Murillo de Río Leza	El Rozo
River Ebro	Rincón de Soto	San Miguel
Varea	Varea, Logroño	Municipal
Yagüe	Logroño	El Salvador

==== League table ====
Pos	Team	Pld	W	D	L	GF	GA	GD	Pts	Qualification
1	Arnedo (C, P, Q)	30	20	8	2	62	25	+37	68	Promotion to Segunda División RFEF and Qualification for Copa del Rey
2	Alfaro (P)	30	21	4	5	65	30	+35	67	Qualification for the promotion play-offs
3	Anguiano	30	18	8	4	61	22	+39	62	Qualification for the promotion play-offs
4	Varea	30	17	8	5	59	36	+23	59	Qualification for the promotion play-offs
5	Casalarreina	30	17	6	7	55	34	+21	57	Qualification for the promotion play-offs
6	La Calzada	30	17	5	8	43	23	+20	56	
7	Oyonesa	30	14	3	13	39	33	+6	45	
8	Calahorra B	30	13	5	12	58	44	+14	44	
9	Agoncillo	30	10	6	14	28	41	−13	36	
10	Haro	30	9	8	13	37	34	+3	35	
11	River Ebro	30	10	3	17	36	48	−12	33	
12	Berceo (Note: Berceo awarded a 0–3 win in their Round 1 match against Cenicero after the latter fielded an ineligible player. The match originally ended 1–0.)	30	9	4	17	40	47	−7	31 (Note: Berceo finished ahead of River Ebro on head-to-head goal difference: Berceo +2, Yagüe -1, Atlético Vianés -1. Yagüe finished ahead of Atlético Vianés on head-to-head goals scored: Yagüe 8, Atlético Vianés 6)	
13	Yagüe	30	8	7	15	38	53	−15	31	
14	Atlético Vianés	30	8	7	15	42	57	−15	31	
15	Rápid (R)	30	4	4	22	24	88	−64	16	Relegation to Regional Preferente
16	Cenicero (R)	30	1	2	27	10	82	−72	5	Relegation to Regional Preferente

Updated to match(es) played on 1 May 2022. Source:
Rules for classification: 1) points; 2) head-to-head points; 3) head-to-head goal difference; 4) goal difference; 5) number of goals scored
(C) Champions; (P) Promoted; (Q) Qualified for the phase indicated; (R) Relegated

=== Group 17 – Aragon ===
Location of teams of the 2020–21 Tercera División Group 17

Teams retained from 2020–21 Tercera División

- Atlético Monzón
- Barbastro
- Belchite 97
- Binéfar
- Borja
- Calamocha
- Cariñena
- Cuarte
- Deportivo Aragón
- Épila
- Illueca
- Robres
- Utebo

Teams promoted from 2020–21 Regional Preferente

- Biescas
- Caspe
- Giner Torrero
- Santa Anastasia

==== Teams and locations ====
Team	City	Home ground
Atlético Monzón	Monzón	Isidro Calderón
Barbastro	Barbastro	Municipal de los Deportes
Belchite 97	Belchite	Municipal
Biescas	Biescas	Fernando Escartín
Binéfar	Binéfar	Los Olmos
Borja	Borja	Manuel Meler
Calamocha	Calamocha	Jumaya
Cariñena	Cariñena	La Platera
Caspe	Caspe	Los Rosales
Cuarte	Cuarte de Huerva	Nuevo Municipal
Deportivo Aragón	Zaragoza	Ciudad Deportiva
Épila	Épila	La Huerta
Giner Torrero	Zaragoza	Torrero
Illueca	Illueca	Papa Luna
Robres	Robres	San Blas
Santa Anastasia	Santa Anastasia	Fontanazas
Utebo	Utebo	Santa Ana

==== League table ====
Pos	Team	Pld	W	D	L	GF	GA	GD	Pts	Qualification
1	Deportivo Aragón (C, P)	32	20	7	5	65	29	+36	67	Promotion to Segunda División RFEF
2	Utebo (Q, P)	32	20	6	6	63	28	+35	66	Qualification for the promotion play-offs and qualification for Copa del Rey
3	Illueca	32	19	8	5	47	31	+16	65	Qualification for the promotion play-offs
4	Binéfar	32	16	8	8	54	30	+24	56	Qualification for the promotion play-offs
5	Robres	32	17	2	13	45	32	+13	53	Qualification for the promotion play-offs
6	Cuarte	32	16	4	12	46	27	+19	52	
7	Atlético Monzón	32	13	10	9	40	23	+17	49	
8	Barbastro	32	13	9	10	36	29	+7	48 (Note: Barbastro finished ahead of Caspe and Épila on head-to-head points: Barbastro 10 pts, Caspe 5 pts, Épila 1 pt)	
9	Caspe	32	13	9	10	46	37	+9	48	
10	Épila	32	15	3	14	39	37	+2	48	
11	Cariñena	32	13	6	13	36	45	−9	45	
12	Calamocha	32	10	6	16	36	40	−4	36	
13	Belchite 97	32	8	9	15	35	43	−8	33 (Note: Belchite 97 finished ahead of Santa Anastasia on overall goal difference)	
14	Santa Anastasia (R)	32	7	12	13	31	40	−9	33	Relegation to Regional Preferente
15	Borja (R)	32	7	8	17	31	48	−17	29	Relegation to Regional Preferente
16	Giner Torrero (R)	32	4	6	22	23	97	−74	18	Relegation to Regional Preferente
17	Biescas (R)	32	1	7	24	10	67	−57	10	Relegation to Regional Preferente

Updated to match(es) played on 1 May 2022. Source:
Rules for classification: 1) points; 2) head-to-head points; 3) head-to-head goal difference; 4) goal difference; 5) number of goals scored
(C) Champions; (P) Promoted; (Q) Qualified for the phase indicated; (R) Relegated

=== Group 18 – Castilla–La Mancha ===
Teams retained from 2020–21 Tercera División

- Almansa
- Atlético Albacete
- Azuqueca
- Conquense
- Guadalajara
- Huracán Balazote
- Illescas
- La Roda
- Manchego
- Quintanar del Rey
- Tarancón
- Torrijos
- Villacañas

Teams relegated from 2020–21 Segunda División B

- Villarrobledo
- Villarrubia

Teams promoted from 2020–21 Primera Autonómica Preferente

- Hogar Alcarreño
- Miguelturreño
- San Clemente

==== Teams and locations ====
Location of teams of the 2021–22 Tercera División Group 18

Team	City	Home ground
Almansa	Almansa	Paco Simón
Atlético Albacete	Albacete	Andrés Iniesta
Azuqueca	Azuqueca de Henares	San Miguel
Conquense	Cuenca	La Fuensanta
Guadalajara	Guadalajara	Pedro Escartín
Hogar Alcarreño	Guadalajara	Fuente la Niña
Huracán Balazote	Balazote	Municipal de Barrax
Illescas	Illescas, Toledo	Municipal
La Roda	La Roda	Estadio Municipal
Manchego	Ciudad Real	Juan Carlos I
Miguelturreño	Miguelturra	Municipal
Quintanar del Rey	Quintanar del Rey	San Marcos
San Clemente	San Clemente	Municipal
Tarancón	Tarancón	Municipal
Torrijos	Torrijos	San Francisco
Villacañas	Villacañas	Las Pirámides
Villarrobledo	Villarrobledo	Nuestra Señora de la Caridad
Villarrubia	Villarrubia de los Ojos	Nuevo Municipal

==== League table ====
Pos	Team	Pld	W	D	L	GF	GA	GD	Pts	Qualification
1	Guadalajara (C, P, Q)	34	23	8	3	71	19	+52	77	Promotion to Segunda División RFEF and Qualification for Copa del Rey
2	Quintanar del Rey (Q)	34	21	7	6	63	29	+34	70	Qualification for the promotion play-offs
3	Illescas (E)	34	20	7	7	56	33	+23	67	Qualification for the promotion play-offs
4	Villarrobledo (E)	34	18	10	6	53	25	+28	64	Qualification for the promotion play-offs
5	Torrijos (E)	34	17	9	8	50	30	+20	60	Qualification for the promotion play-offs
6	Conquense	34	15	11	8	49	30	+19	56	
7	Villarrubia	34	16	7	11	45	38	+7	55	
8	Azuqueca	34	16	6	12	55	40	+15	54 (Note: Azuqueca finished ahead of Manchego on head-to-head points: Azuqueca–Manchego 2–0, Manchego–Azuqueca 0–0)	
9	Manchego	34	15	9	10	50	26	+24	54	
10	Tarancón	34	16	3	15	46	45	+1	51	
11	Villacañas	34	13	7	14	47	51	−4	46	
12	Atlético Albacete	34	11	11	12	47	40	+7	44	
13	Almansa	34	12	7	15	44	51	−7	43	
14	Huracán Balazote (Note: Relegated due to relegations of regional teams from Segunda División RFEF) (R)	34	10	7	17	52	56	−4	37	Relegation to Primera Autonómica Preferente
15	San Clemente (R)	34	10	6	18	30	50	−20	36	Relegation to Primera Autonómica Preferente
16	Miguelturreño (R)	34	7	4	23	35	67	−32	25	Relegation to Primera Autonómica Preferente
17	Hogar Alcarreño (R)	34	4	5	25	29	90	−61	17	Relegation to Primera Autonómica Preferente
18	La Roda (Note: La Roda was disqualified from the competition for not paying its players. All opponents were subsequently awarded 3–0 wins.) (D)	34	0	0	34	0	102	−102	0	Disqualified from competition

Updated to match(es) played on 1 May 2022. Source:
Rules for classification: 1) points; 2) head-to-head points; 3) head-to-head goal difference; 4) goal difference; 5) number of goals scored
(C) Champions; (D) Disqualified; (E) Eliminated; (P) Promoted; (Q) Qualified for the phase indicated; (R) Relegated

== Copa del Rey qualification ==
25 teams qualified for the 2022–23 Copa del Rey: the best teams in each group (excluding reserves) and the 7 best second-placed teams ranked by their points coefficient. Should any second-placed team among these 7 qualify already as the best non-reserve team in its group, a ranking of third-placed teams would fill the remaining vacants.

=== Ranking of second-placed teams ===
Pos	Grp	Team	Pld	W	D	L	GF	GA	GD	Pts	Coeff	Qualification
1	16	Alfaro	30	21	4	5	65	30	+35	67	2.233	Qualification for Copa del Rey
2	15	Subiza	30	20	4	6	62	24	+38	64	2.133	Qualification for Copa del Rey
3	10	Utrera	32	20	7	5	59	26	+33	67	2.094	Qualification for Copa del Rey
4	1	Ourense CF (Note: Qualified as the best-classified team in its group after a reserve team)	32	19	10	3	48	21	+27	67	2.094	Qualification for Copa del Rey
5	17	Utebo	32	20	6	6	63	28	+35	66	2.063	Qualification for Copa del Rey
6	18	Quintanar del Rey	34	21	7	6	63	29	+34	70	2.059	Qualification for Copa del Rey
7	11	Manacor	40	26	4	10	74	42	+32	82	2.050	Qualification for Copa del Rey
8	8	Almazán	32	20	4	8	51	28	+23	64	2.000	Qualification for Copa del Rey
9	2	Sporting Gijón B	38	21	11	6	71	25	+46	74	1.947	
10	5	Olot	32	18	7	7	53	32	+21	61	1.906	Qualification for Copa del Rey
11	3	Vimenor	30	16	9	5	49	27	+22	57	1.900	Qualification for Copa del Rey
12	7	Las Rozas	40	22	9	9	68	35	+33	75	1.875	Qualification for Copa del Rey
13	4	Beasain	38	19	13	6	65	36	+29	70	1.842	Qualification for Copa del Rey
14	9	Huétor Tájar	32	16	10	6	56	30	+26	58	1.813	
15	12	Las Palmas C (Note: Las Palmas C was relegated due to Las Palmas Atlético's relegation from Segunda División RFEF)	32	18	4	10	47	30	+17	58	1.813	Relegation to Interinsular Preferente
16	6	Atlético Saguntino	36	17	13	6	46	30	+16	64	1.778	Qualification for Copa del Rey
17	13	Cartagena B	34	17	9	8	61	32	+29	60	1.765	
18	14	Moralo	30	14	10	6	39	19	+20	52	1.733	

Source: RFEF – Tournament rules: Copa del Rey
Rules for classification: 1) coefficient; 2) goal difference; 3) number of goals scored; 4) fair-play points; 5) playoff match

== See also ==
- 2021–22 La Liga
- 2021–22 Segunda División
- 2021–22 Primera División RFEF
- 2021–22 Segunda División RFEF
