= Uritarra KT =

Association football club in Spain

Uritarra
- Full name: Uritarra Kirol Taldea
- Founded: 1947
- Ground: Errebale, Larrabetzu, Basque Country, Spain
- Capacity: 1,000
- President: Iban García Larrazabal
- Manager: Endika León
- League: División de Honor
- 2024–25: División de Honor, 6th of 18
Home colours	Away colours

Uritarra Kirol Taldea (Club Deportivo Uritarra in Spanish) is a Spanish football club based in Larrabetzu, in the autonomous community of Basque Country. Founded in 1947, they play in División de Honor, holding home games at Errebale Futbol Zelaia, with a capacity of 1,000 people.

== History ==
Founded in 1947, Uritarra played only friendlies in their first years, before entering competitions in 1949. The club played two matches at the San Mamés Stadium in 1953 and 1955, after being champion of their group in both Segunda and Primera Regional, but ceased activities in 1959 due to financial reasons.

Back to an active status in 1987, Uritarra achieved a first-ever promotion to Tercera División RFEF in June 2021.

== Season to season ==
Season	Tier	Division	Place	Copa del Rey
1949–50	6	3ª Reg.	6th	
1950–51	6	3ª Reg.	6th	
1951–52	6	3ª Reg.	6th	
1952–53	6	3ª Reg.	1st	
1953–54	5	2ª Reg.	10th	
1954–55	5	2ª Reg.	1st	
1955–56	4	1ª Reg.	1st	
1956–57	4	1ª Reg.	16th	
1957–58	5	2ª Reg.	11th	
1958–59	5	2ª Reg.	14th	
1959–1986	DNP			
1986–87	7	2ª Reg.	4th	
1987–88	7	2ª Reg.	2nd	
1988–89	6	1ª Reg.	13th	
1989–90	6	1ª Reg.	14th	
1990–91	6	1ª Terr.	15th	
1991–92	6	1ª Terr.	11th	
1992–93	6	1ª Terr.	18th	
1993–94	7	2ª Terr.	3rd	
1994–95	7	2ª Terr.	1st	

Season	Tier	Division	Place	Copa del Rey
1995–96	6	1ª Terr.	9th	
1996–97	6	1ª Terr.	12th	
1997–98	6	1ª Terr.	8th	
1998–99	6	1ª Terr.	18th	
1999–2000	7	2ª Terr.	4th	
2000–01	7	2ª Terr.	3rd	
2001–02	7	2ª Terr.	7th	
2002–03	8	2ª Div.	10th	
2003–04	8	2ª Div.	6th	
2004–05	8	2ª Div.	2nd	
2005–06	7	1ª Div.	6th	
2006–07	7	1ª Div.	6th	
2007–08	7	1ª Div.	13th	
2008–09	7	1ª Div.	14th	
2009–10	7	1ª Div.	10th	
2010–11	7	1ª Div.	7th	
2011–12	7	1ª Div.	7th	
2012–13	7	1ª Div.	5th	
2013–14	7	1ª Div.	1st	
2014–15	6	Pref.	6th	

Season	Tier	Division	Place	Copa del Rey
2015–16	6	Pref.	4th	
2016–17	6	Pref.	6th	
2017–18	6	Pref.	1st	
2018–19	5	Div. Hon.	6th	
2019–20	5	Div. Hon.	8th	
2020–21	5	Div. Hon.	1st	
2021–22	5	3ª RFEF	17th	
2022–23	6	Div. Hon.	6th	
2023–24	6	Div. Hon.	15th	
2024–25	6	Div. Hon.	6th	
2025–26	6	Div. Hon.		

- 1 seasons in Tercera División RFEF
