= Archena FC =

Association football club in Spain

Archena
- Full name: Archena Fútbol Club
- Founded: 2015; 2022 (refounded)
- Ground: Andrés Abenza, Archena, Region of Murcia, Spain
- Capacity: 1,000
- President: Justino Martínez
- Manager: Iko Juliá
- League: Preferente Autonómica
- 2024–25: Preferente Autonómica, 15th of 18
Home colours	Away colours

Archena Fútbol Club is a Spanish football team from Archena, Murcia. Founded in 2015, they play in Preferente Autonómica, holding home matches at the Campo Municipal Andrés Abenza.

== History ==
Logo of Archena Sport FC

Founded in 2015 as Unión Archena Fútbol Club, the club was renamed Archena Smart Fútbol in 2017, and achieved a promotion to Preferente Autonómica in 2018, after obtaining Jumilla CD's place in the division. The club then changed name to Archena Sport Fútbol Club, and achieved a first-ever promotion to Tercera División RFEF in June 2021.

In June 2022, Archena Sport gave up their spot in the fifth division, which was subsequently bought by Unión Molinense CF. The club was then "refounded" as Archena Fútbol Club, returning to the lower division of regional football (Segunda Autonómica).

== Season to season ==
Season	Tier	Division	Place	Copa del Rey
2015–16	7	2ª Aut.	17th	
2016–17	6	1ª Aut.	7th	
2017–18	6	1ª Aut.	8th	
2018–19	5	Pref. Aut.	14th	
2019–20	5	Pref. Aut.	7th	
2020–21	5	Pref. Aut.	1st	
2021–22	5	3ª RFEF	12th	
2022–23	8	2ª Aut.	2nd	
2023–24	7	1ª Aut.	2nd	
2024–25	6	Pref. Aut.	15th	
2025–26	6	Pref. Aut.		

- 1 season in Tercera División RFEF
