= UD Benigànim =

Spanish football club

Benigànim
- Full name: Unión Deportiva Benigànim
- Founded: 1949
- Dissolved: 2023
- Ground: Municipal, Benigànim, Valencia, Spain
- Capacity: 2,000
- 2022–23: Regional Preferente – Group 2, 17th of 18 (relegated)
Home colours	Away colours

Unión Deportiva Benigànim (Unión Deportiva SIA Benigànim for sponsorship reasons) was a Spanish football team based in Benigànim, in the Valencian Community. Founded in 1949, they last played in Regional Preferente – Group 2, and held home matches at Campo Municipal de Benigànim.

== History ==
Founded in 1949, Benigànim started playing in the Regional Preferente in the 1980s, and managed to remain in the division for nearly three decades. In June 2014, the club achieved a first-ever promotion to Tercera División.

In July 2019, after another promotion to the fourth division, Benigànim reached an agreement with Soccer Inter-Action (SIA) to manage the club. In July 2023, after suffering two consecutive relegations, SIA left the club to start a project with UD Alzira as their reserve team, and Benigànim was subsequently dissolved. In the meantime, Benigànim CF (founded in 2020) became the main club of the city.

== Season to season ==
Season	Tier	Division	Place	Copa del Rey
1949–1973	—	Regional	—	
1973–74	6	2ª Reg.	2nd	
1974–75	5	1ª Reg.	13th	
1975–76	5	1ª Reg.	14th	
1976–77	5	1ª Reg.	13th	
1977–78	6	1ª Reg.	17th	
1978–79	6	1ª Reg.	14th	
1979–80	6	1ª Reg.	3rd	
1980–81	7	2ª Reg.	6th	
1981–82	7	2ª Reg.	12th	
1982–83	7	2ª Reg.	11th	
1983–84	7	2ª Reg.	1st	
1984–85	6	1ª Reg.	3rd	
1985–86	6	1ª Reg.	4th	
1986–87	6	1ª Reg.	4th	
1987–88	6	1ª Reg.		
1988–89	5	Reg. Pref.	10th	
1989–90	5	Reg. Pref.	3rd	
1990–91	5	Reg. Pref.	6th	
1991–92	5	Reg. Pref.	11th	

Season	Tier	Division	Place	Copa del Rey
1992–93	5	Reg. Pref.	16th	
1993–94	5	Reg. Pref.	11th	
1994–95	5	Reg. Pref.	4th	
1995–96	5	Reg. Pref.	12th	
1996–97	5	Reg. Pref.	10th	
1997–98	5	Reg. Pref.	6th	
1998–99	5	Reg. Pref.	3rd	
1999–2000	5	Reg. Pref.	2nd	
2000–01	5	Reg. Pref.	11th	
2001–02	5	Reg. Pref.	14th	
2002–03	5	Reg. Pref.	11th	
2003–04	5	Reg. Pref.	14th	
2004–05	5	Reg. Pref.	13th	
2005–06	5	Reg. Pref.	8th	
2006–07	5	Reg. Pref.	12th	
2007–08	5	Reg. Pref.	12th	
2008–09	5	Reg. Pref.	4th	
2009–10	5	Reg. Pref.	6th	
2010–11	5	Reg. Pref.	11th	
2011–12	5	Reg. Pref.	9th	

Season	Tier	Division	Place	Copa del Rey
2012–13	5	Reg. Pref.	2nd	
2013–14	5	Reg. Pref.	2nd	
2014–15	4	3ª	9th	
2015–16	4	3ª	19th	
2016–17	5	Reg. Pref.	3rd	
2017–18	5	Reg. Pref.	4th	

Season	Tier	Division	Place	Copa del Rey
2018–19	5	Reg. Pref.	3rd	
2019–20	4	3ª	20th	
2020–21	4	3ª	5th / 6th	
2021–22	5	3ª RFEF	18th	
2022–23	6	Reg. Pref.	17th	

- 4 seasons in Tercera División
- 1 season in Tercera División RFEF
