= AD Complutense =

Spanish football club

Complutense
- Full name: Agrupación Deportiva Complutense Alcalá
- Founded: 1991
- Ground: El Recinto Ferial, Alcalá de Henares, Community of Madrid, Spain
- Capacity: 500
- President: Andrés Pizarro
- Manager: Álvaro Vara
- League: Primera Autonómica de Aficionados – Group 1
- 2024–25: Preferente de Aficionados – Group 2, 2nd of 18 (promoted)
- Website: www.adcomplutense.es
Home colours	Away colours

Agrupación Deportiva Complutense Alcalá is a Spanish football club based in Alcalá de Henares, in the Community of Madrid. Founded in 1991, they play in Primera Autonómica de Aficionados – Group 1, holding home matches at the Campo de Fútbol El Recinto Ferial.

== History ==
Founded in 1991, Complutense increasingly created youth teams over the decade. In May 2020, the club achieved a first-ever promotion to Tercera División.

== Season-to-season ==
Season	Tier	Division	Place	Copa del Rey
1995–96	7	2ª Reg.	3rd	
1996–97	7	2ª Reg.	10th	
1997–98	6	1ª Reg.	15th	
1998–99	6	1ª Reg.	6th	
1999–2000	6	1ª Reg.	15th	
2000–01	6	1ª Reg.	8th	
2001–02	6	1ª Reg.	11th	
2002–03	6	1ª Reg.	1st	
2003–04	5	Reg. Pref.	12th	
2004–05	5	Reg. Pref.	9th	
2005–06	5	Reg. Pref.	11th	
2006–07	5	Reg. Pref.	9th	
2007–08	5	Reg. Pref.	17th	
2008–09	6	1ª Reg.	5th	
2009–10	6	1ª Afic.	7th	
2010–11	6	1ª Afic.	2nd	
2011–12	5	Pref.	17th	
2012–13	6	1ª Afic.	4th	
2013–14	6	1ª Afic.	2nd	
2014–15	5	Pref.	4th	

Season	Tier	Division	Place	Copa del Rey
2015–16	5	Pref.	8th	
2016–17	5	Pref.	14th	
2017–18	5	Pref.	13th	
2018–19	5	Pref.	9th	
2019–20	5	Pref.	1st	
2020–21	4	3ª	7th / 4th	
2021–22	5	3ª RFEF	19th	
2022–23	6	Pref.	17th	
2023–24	7	1ª Afic.	6th	
2024–25	7	Pref. Afic.	2nd	
2025–26	6	1ª Aut.		

- 1 season in Tercera División
- 1 season in Tercera División RFEF

== Official website ==
- Official website (in Spanish)
