= Atlético Arnoia =

- Full name: Atlético Arnoia
- Founded: 1969; 57 years ago
- Stadium: Campo Municipal da Queixeira
- Capacity: 400
- President: Rodrigo Aparicio
- Head coach: Marcos Álvarez
- League: Preferente Futgal – Group 2
- 2025–26: Preferente Futgal – Group 2, 6th of 18
Home colours	Away colours

Atlético Arnoia, is a Spanish football club based in A Arnoia, in the autonomous community of Galicia. Founded in 1969, they currently play in Preferente Futgal – Group 2, holding home matches at the Campo Municipal da Queixeira.

== History ==
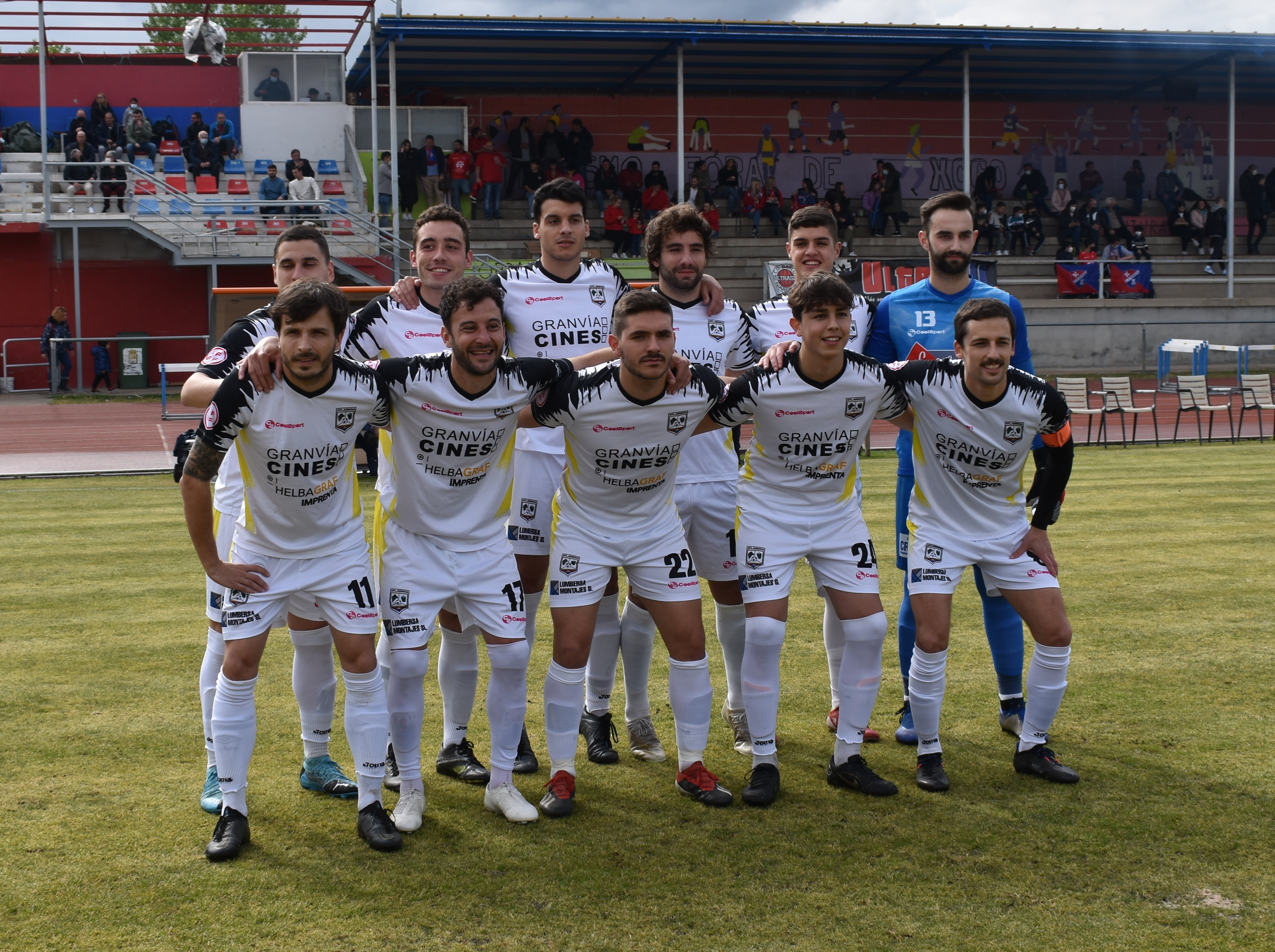
Atlético Arnoia lineup in 2022

Founded in 1969, Atlético Arnoia first reached the Preferente de Galicia in April 2019, after being crowned champions of the Primeira Galicia. In July 2021, the club achieved a first-ever promotion to a national division, the Tercera División RFEF.

== Season to season ==
Season	Tier	Division	Place	Copa del Rey
1969–70	5	1ª Reg.	5th	
1970–71	5	1ª Reg.	5th	
1971–72	5	1ª Reg.	3rd	
1972–73	5	1ª Reg.	3rd	
1973–74	6	2ª Reg.	13th	
1974–75	6	3ª Reg.	14th	
1975–76	6	3ª Reg.	5th	
1976–77	6	3ª Reg.		
1977–78	7	3ª Reg.	3rd	
1978–79	7	2ª Reg.		
1979–80	8	3ª Reg.	5th	
1980–81	8	3ª Reg.	1st	
1981–82	7	2ª Reg.	12th	
1982–83	7	2ª Reg.	4th	
1983–84	6	1ª Reg.	6th	
1984–85	6	1ª Reg.	12th	
1985–86	6	1ª Reg.	8th	
1986–87	6	1ª Reg.	8th	
1987–88	6	1ª Reg.	3rd	
1988–89	7	2ª Reg.	5th	

Season	Tier	Division	Place	Copa del Rey
1989–90	7	2ª Reg.	7th	
1990–91	7	2ª Reg.	6th	
1991–92	7	2ª Reg.	6th	
1992–93	7	2ª Reg.	13th	
1993–94	7	2ª Reg.	8th	
1994–95	7	2ª Reg.	9th	
1995–96	7	2ª Reg.	3rd	
1996–97	7	2ª Reg.	4th	
1997–98	7	2ª Reg.	9th	
1998–99	7	2ª Reg.	4th	
1999–2000	7	2ª Reg.	10th	
2000–01	7	2ª Reg.	14th	
2001–02	8	3ª Reg.	4th	
2002–03	7	2ª Reg.	12th	
2003–04	7	2ª Reg.	8th	
2004–05	7	2ª Reg.	15th	
2005–06	8	3ª Reg.	4th	
2006–07	7	2ª Aut.	13th	
2007–08	7	2ª Aut.	9th	
2008–09	7	2ª Aut.	12th	

Season	Tier	Division	Place	Copa del Rey
2009–10	7	2ª Aut.	8th	
2010–11	7	2ª Aut.	8th	
2011–12	7	2ª Aut.	9th	
2012–13	7	2ª Aut.	10th	
2013–14	7	2ª Aut.	4th	
2014–15	7	2ª Aut.	4th	
2015–16	7	2ª Aut.	2nd	
2016–17	6	1ª Gal.	5th	
2017–18	6	1ª Gal.	6th	
2018–19	6	1ª Gal.	1st	
2019–20	5	Pref.	9th	
2020–21	5	Pref.	1st	
2021–22	5	3ª RFEF	16th	
2022–23	6	Pref.	13th	
2023–24	6	Pref.	12th	
2024–25	6	Pref. Futgal	9th	
2025–26	6	Pref. Futgal		

- 1 season in Tercera División RFEF
