= CD Gares =

Association football club in Spain

Gares
- Full name: Club Deportivo Gares
- Founded: 1966
- Ground: Osabidea, Puente la Reina, Navarre, Spain
- Capacity: 1,000
- President: Iñaki Erdozáin
- Manager: Javier Gutiérrez and Manuel Murie
- League: Primera Autonómica
- 2025–26: Primera Autonómica, 10th of 18
Home colours	Away colours

Club Deportivo Gares is a Spanish football team based in Puente la Reina in the autonomous community of Navarre. Founded in 1966, it plays in Primera Autonómica, holding home matches in the Complejo Deportivo Municipal Osabidea, with a capacity of 1,000 people.

== Season to season ==
Season	Tier	Division	Place	Copa del Rey
1966–67	5	2ª Reg.	7th	
1967–68	DNP			
1968–69	5	2ª Reg.	11th	
1969–70	5	2ª Reg.	2nd	
1970–71	5	2ª Reg.	5th	
1971–72	5	2ª Reg.	9th	
1972–73	5	2ª Reg.	12th	
1973–74	5	2ª Reg.	11th	
1974–75	5	1ª Reg.	8th	
1975–76	5	1ª Reg.	10th	
1976–77	5	1ª Reg.	6th	
1977–78	6	1ª Reg.	4th	
1978–79	6	1ª Reg.	12th	
1979–80	6	1ª Reg.	12th	
1980–81	6	1ª Reg.	13th	
1981–82	7	2ª Reg.	3rd	
1982–83	6	1ª Reg.	17th	
1983–84	DNP			
1984–85	DNP			
1985–86	7	2ª Reg.	2nd	

Season	Tier	Division	Place	Copa del Rey
1986–87	6	1ª Reg.	9th	
1987–88	6	1ª Reg.	19th	
1988–1993	DNP			
1993–94	6	1ª Reg.	6th	
1994–95	6	1ª Reg.	8th	
1995–96	6	1ª Reg.	8th	
1996–97	6	1ª Reg.	3rd	
1997–98	5	Reg. Pref.	20th	
1998–99	6	1ª Reg.	1st	
1999–2000	5	Reg. Pref.	16th	
2000–01	6	1ª Reg.	3rd	
2001–02	6	1ª Reg.	2nd	
2002–03	5	Reg. Pref.	13th	
2003–04	5	Reg. Pref.	9th	
2004–05	5	Reg. Pref.	14th	
2005–06	5	Reg. Pref.	5th	
2006–07	5	Reg. Pref.	4th	
2007–08	5	Reg. Pref.	3rd	
2008–09	5	Reg. Pref.	16th	
2009–10	6	1ª Reg.	1st	

Season	Tier	Division	Place	Copa del Rey
2010–11	5	Reg. Pref.	9th	
2011–12	5	Reg. Pref.	13th	
2012–13	5	Reg. Pref.	5th	
2013–14	5	Reg. Pref.	6th	
2014–15	5	Reg. Pref.	11th	
2015–16	6	Reg. Pref.	1st	
2016–17	5	1ª Aut.	2nd	
2017–18	4	3ª	20th	
2018–19	5	1ª Aut.	5th	
2019–20	5	1ª Aut.	8th	
2020–21	5	1ª Aut.	3rd	
2021–22	5	3ª RFEF	16th	
2022–23	6	1ª Aut.	5th	
2023–24	6	1ª Aut.	4th	
2024–25	5	3ª Fed.	17th	
2025–26	6	1ª Aut.		

- 1 season in Tercera División
- 2 seasons in Tercera Federación/Tercera División RFEF
