= Beti Gazte KJKE =

Association football club in Spain

Beti Gazte
- Full name: Beti Gazte Kirol Jolas Kultur Elkartea
- Founded: 9 August 1940; 85 years ago
- Ground: Mastegi, Lesaka, Navarre, Spain
- Capacity: 500
- President: Ander Abuin
- Manager: Eneko Ferradas
- League: División de Honor
- 2024–25: División de Honor, 14th of 18
- Website: www.betigazte.net
Home colours	Away colours

Beti Gazte Kirol Jolas Kultur Elkartea (Sociedad Deportiva, Cultural y Recreativa Beti Gazte in Spanish) is a Spanish multi-sport club based in Lesaka, in the autonomous community of Navarre. Founded in 1976, their football section play in División de Honor, holding home games at Campo de Fútbol Mastegi, with a capacity of 500 people.

== History ==
Founded on 9 August 1940, Beti Gazte started with five sports: Basque pelota, football, mountaineering, cycling and athletics. The club entered the Basque Football Federation in the 1970s, and won the Segunda Regional de Guipúzcoa in the 1979–80 season.

In June 2021, Beti Gazte achieved a first-ever promotion to Tercera División RFEF.

== Season to season ==
Season	Tier	Division	Place	Copa del Rey
1977–78	7	2ª Reg.	9th	
1978–79	7	2ª Reg.	5th	
1979–80	7	2ª Reg.	1st	
1980–81	6	1ª Reg.	10th	
1981–82	6	1ª Reg.	5th	
1982–83	6	1ª Reg.	7th	
1983–84	6	1ª Reg.	14th	
1984–85	7	2ª Reg.	1st	
1985–86	6	1ª Reg.	2nd	
1986–87	5	Reg. Pref.	11th	
1987–88	5	Reg. Pref.	14th	
1988–89	5	Reg. Pref.	9th	
1989–90	5	Reg. Pref.	16th	
1990–91	5	Reg. Pref.	16th	
1991–92	5	Reg. Pref.	18th	
1992–93	6	1ª Reg.	11th	
1993–94	6	1ª Reg.	2nd	
1994–95	5	Reg. Pref.	18th	
1995–96	6	1ª Reg.	1st	
1996–97	5	Reg. Pref.	16th	

Season	Tier	Division	Place	Copa del Rey
1997–98	5	Reg. Pref.	12th	
1998–99	5	Reg. Pref.	14th	
1999–2000	5	Reg. Pref.	18th	
2000–01	6	1ª Reg.	3rd	
2001–02	6	1ª Reg.	5th	
2002–03	6	1ª Reg.	1st	
2003–04	5	Reg. Pref.	15th	
2004–05	5	Reg. Pref.	17th	
2005–06	5	Reg. Pref.	19th	
2006–07	6	1ª Reg.	3rd	
2007–08	6	1ª Reg.	10th	
2008–09	6	1ª Reg.	2nd	
2009–10	5	Div. Hon.	16th	
2010–11	6	Pref.	1st	
2011–12	5	Div. Hon.	6th	
2012–13	5	Div. Hon.	13th	
2013–14	5	Div. Hon.	9th	
2014–15	5	Div. Hon.	9th	
2015–16	5	Div. Hon.	15th	
2016–17	5	Div. Hon.	12th	

Season	Tier	Division	Place	Copa del Rey
2017–18	5	Div. Hon.	12th	
2018–19	5	Div. Hon.	6th	
2019–20	5	Div. Hon.	4th	
2020–21	5	Div. Hon.	1st	
2021–22	5	3ª RFEF	19th	
2022–23	6	Div. Hon.	10th	
2023–24	6	Div. Hon.	14th	
2024–25	6	Div. Hon.	14th	
2025–26	6	Div. Hon.		

- 1 season in Tercera División RFEF
