= UD Biescas =

Biescas
- Full name: Unión Deportiva Biescas
- Founded: 1945; 81 years ago
- Ground: Fernando Escartín, Biescas, Aragon, Spain
- Capacity: 1,000
- President: Vicente García Alguacil
- Head coach: Marcos Piedrafita
- League: Primera Regional – Group 2
- 2025–26: Primera Regional – Group 2, 12th of 18
Home colours	Away colours

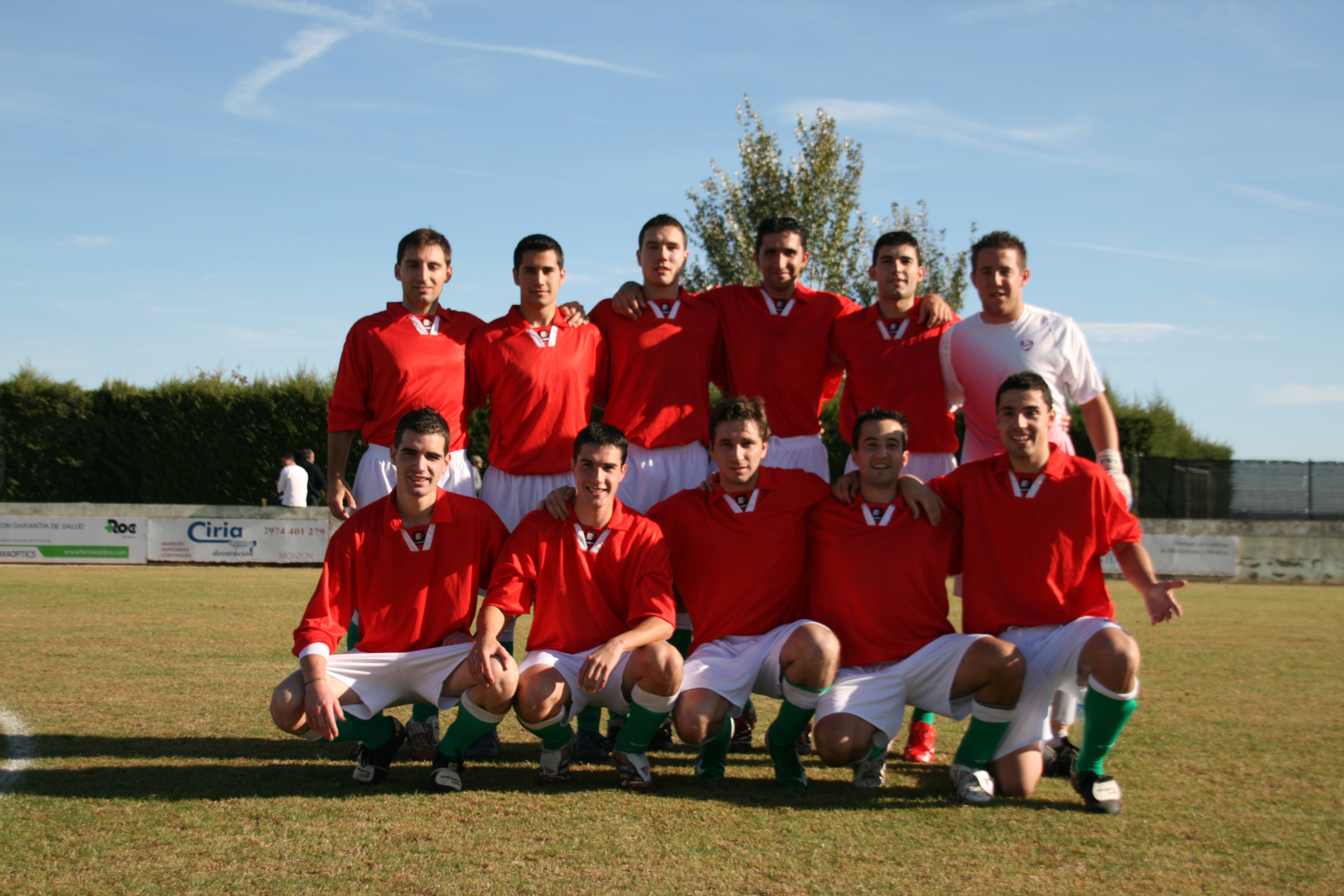
The starting line-up against Altorricón in 2008.

Unión Deportiva Biescas is a Spanish football team based in Biescas, in the autonomous community of Aragon. Founded in 1945, it currently plays in Primera Regional – Group 2, holding home matches at Campo de Fútbol del Polideportivo Fernando Escartín Coti.

== History ==
Founded in 1945, the club only played regional football until 1990, when it achieved promotion to Tercera División. They suffered immediate relegation after finishing last in their group, and suffered a consecutive relegation in 1992 after finishing 16th in the Regional Preferente.

In 2010, after spending several seasons fluctuating between the fifth and sixth levels, Biescas was relegated to Segunda Regional, the seventh division. They returned to the sixth tier in 2013, and to the fifth in 2017.

On 26 June 2021, Biescas returned to a national division after 31 years, as they achieved promotion to Tercera División RFEF after defeating UD San Lorenzo de Flumen.

== Stadium ==
Biescas' current stadium is the Campo de Fútbol de Polideportivo Fernando Escartín Coti, which was named in honour of Fernando Escartín, a Spanish cyclist born in Biescas.

== Season to season ==
Season	Tier	Division	Place	Copa del Rey
1949–50	6	3ª Reg.	4th	
1950–1984	DNP			
1984–85	9	3ª Reg.	1st	
1985–86	7	2ª Reg.	1st	
1986–87	6	1ª Reg.	1st	
1987–88	5	Reg. Pref.	11th	
1988–89	5	Reg. Pref.	9th	
1989–90	5	Reg. Pref.	2nd	
1990–91	4	3ª	20h	
1991–92	5	Reg. Pref.	16th	
1992–93	6	1ª Reg.	2nd	
1993–94	5	Reg. Pref.	17th	
1994–95	6	1ª Reg.	4th	
1995–96	6	1ª Reg.	6th	
1996–97	6	1ª Reg.	14th	
1997–98	6	1ª Reg.	16th	
1998–99	6	1ª Reg.	13th	
1999–2000	6	1ª Reg.	10th	
2000–01	6	1ª Reg.	2nd	
2001–02	5	Reg. Pref.	14th	

Season	Tier	Division	Place	Copa del Rey
2002–03	5	Reg. Pref.	18th	
2003–04	6	1ª Reg.	7th	
2004–05	6	1ª Reg.	4th	
2005–06	6	1ª Reg.	7th	
2006–07	6	1ª Reg.	9th	
2007–08	6	1ª Reg.	2nd	
2008–09	5	Reg. Pref.	17th	
2009–10	6	1ª Reg.	16th	
2010–11	7	2ª Reg.	4th	
2011–12	7	2ª Reg.	6th	
2012–13	7	2ª Reg.	3rd	
2013–14	6	1ª Reg.	7th	
2014–15	6	1ª Reg.	10th	
2015–16	6	1ª Reg.	4th	
2016–17	6	1ª Reg.	2nd	
2017–18	5	Reg. Pref.	11th	
2018–19	5	Reg. Pref.	7th	
2019–20	5	Reg. Pref.	15th	
2020–21	5	Reg. Pref.	1st	
2021–22	5	3ª RFEF	17th	

Season	Tier	Division	Place	Copa del Rey
2022–23	6	Reg. Pref.	14th	
2023–24	7	1ª Reg.	13th	
2024–25	7	1ª Reg.	11th	
2025–26	7	1ª Reg.	12th	
2026–27	7	1ª Reg.		

- 1 season in Tercera División
- 1 season in Tercera División RFEF
