= SD Sofán =

Association football club in Spain

Sofán
- Full name: Sociedad Deportiva Sofán
- Founded: 1979
- Ground: O Carral, Sofán, Carballo, Galicia, Spain
- Capacity: 600
- President: Ricardo Serrano
- Manager: Pablo Torreira
- League: Preferente Futgal – Group 1
- 2024–25: Preferente Futgal – Group 1, 5th of 18
Home colours	Away colours

Sociedad Deportiva Sofán is a Spanish football club based in Sofán, Carballo, in the autonomous community of Galicia. Founded in 1979, they play in Preferente Futgal – Group 1, holding home matches at the Campo Municipal do Carral.

== History ==
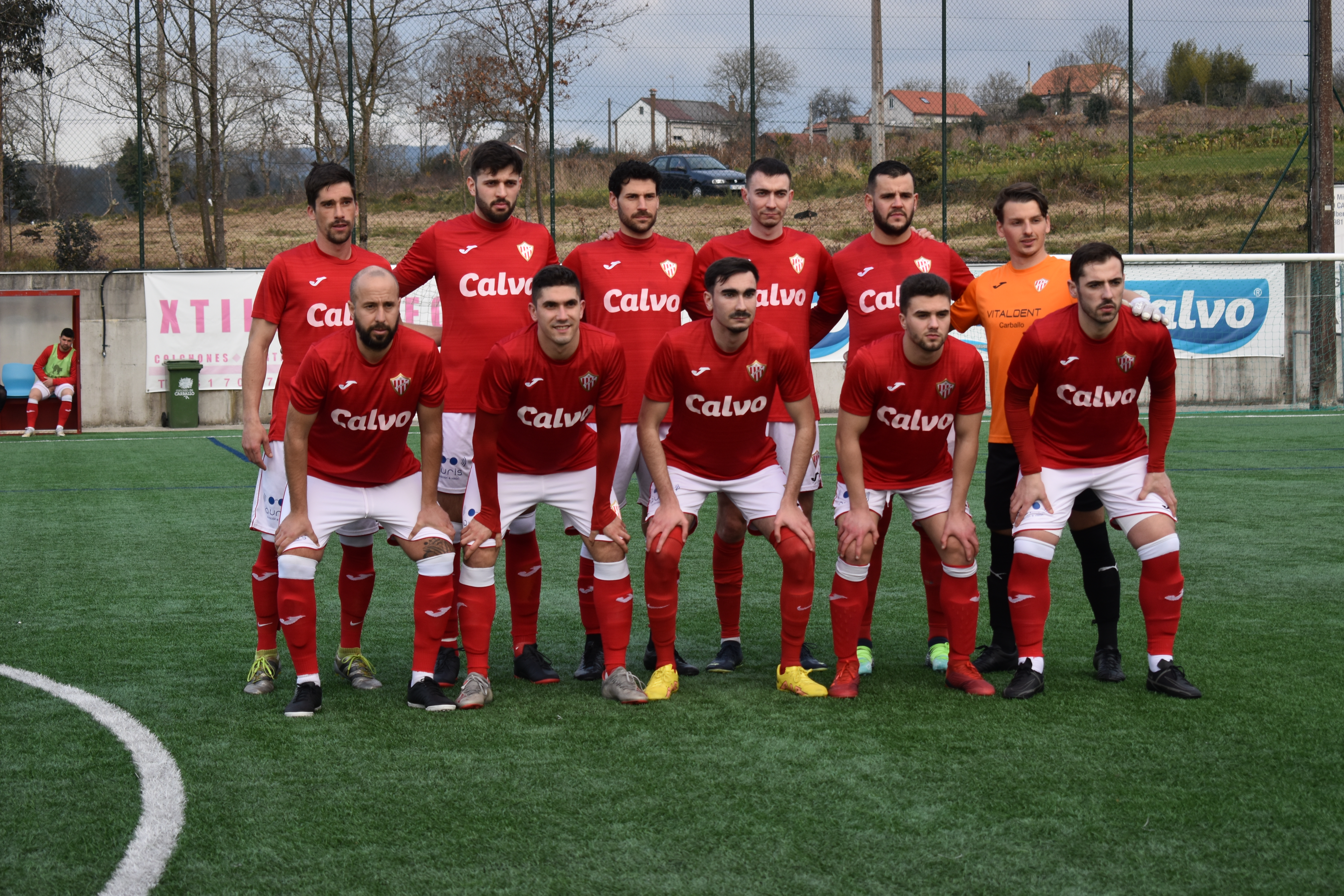
Sofán squad in March 2023

Founded in 1979, Sofán first achieved promotion to the Preferente in 2016. In June 2019, the club reached an agreement with Bergantiños FC to act as their reserve team.

In July 2021, Sofán achieved a first-ever promotion to a national division, reaching the Tercera División RFEF. After immediately suffering relegation, the affiliation with Bergantiños ended in 2023, with Sofán themselves starting their own B-team.

== Season to season ==
Season	Tier	Division	Place	Copa del Rey
1997–98	8	3ª Reg.	8th	
1998–99	8	3ª Reg.	1st	
1999–2000	7	2ª Reg.	6th	
2000–01	7	2ª Reg.	10th	
2001–02	7	2ª Reg.	15th	
2002–03	8	3ª Reg.	3rd	
2003–04	7	2ª Reg.	8th	
2004–05	7	2ª Reg.	15th	
2005–06	8	3ª Reg.	1st	
2006–07	7	2ª Aut.	9th	
2007–08	7	2ª Aut.	11th	
2008–09	7	2ª Aut.	9th	
2009–10	7	2ª Aut.	3rd	
2010–11	7	2ª Aut.	3rd	
2011–12	7	2ª Aut.	8th	
2012–13	7	2ª Aut.	5th	
2013–14	7	2ª Aut.	2nd	
2014–15	6	1ª Aut.	6th	
2015–16	6	1ª Aut.	2nd	
2016–17	5	Pref.	12th	

Season	Tier	Division	Place	Copa del Rey
2017–18	5	Pref.	11th	
2018–19	5	Pref.	8th	
2019–20	5	Pref.	8th	N/A (Note: Reserve team of Bergantiños.)
2020–21	5	Pref.	2nd	N/A
2021–22	5	3ª RFEF	17th	N/A
2022–23	6	Pref.	9th	N/A
2023–24	6	Pref.	8th	
2024–25	6	Pref. Futgal	5th	
2025–26	6	Pref. Futgal		

- 1 season in Tercera Federación
