= CD Giner Torrero =

Spanish football team

Giner Torrero
- Full name: Club Deportivo Giner Torrero
- Founded: 1967
- Ground: Municipal Torrero, Zaragoza, Aragon, Spain
- Capacity: 500
- Chairman: (Spain) José Luis Hernández
- Manager: (Spain) Juan Carlos Galindo
- League: Segunda Regional – Group 1
- 2025–26: Primera Regional – Group 1, 17th of 18 (relegated)
- Website: https://www.cdginertorrero.com/
Home colours	Away colours

Club Deportivo Giner Torrero is a Spanish football team based in Zaragoza in the community of Aragon. Founded in 1967, it plays in Segunda Regional – Group 1.

== Season to season ==
Season	Tier	Division	Place	Copa del Rey
1967–68	7	3ª Reg.	3rd	
1968–69	7	3ª Reg.	5th	
1969–70	7	3ª Reg.	(R)	
1970–71	6	2ª Reg.	5th	
1971–72	6	2ª Reg.	3rd	
1972–73	7	2ª Reg. B	2nd	
1973–74	7	2ª Reg. B	8th	
1974–75	8	3ª Reg.	2nd	
1975–76	7	2ª Reg. B	13th	
1976–77	7	2ª Reg. B	5th	
1976–77	6	2ª Reg.	14th	
1978–79	8	2ª Reg. B	2nd	
1979–80	8	2ª Reg. B	5th	
1980–81	8	2ª Reg. B	1st	
1981–82	7	2ª Reg.	1st	
1982–83	6	1ª Reg.	19th	
1983–84	6	1ª Reg.	12th	
1984–85	6	1ª Reg.	7th	
1985–86	6	1ª Reg.	5th	
1986–87	6	1ª Reg.	1st	

Season	Tier	Division	Place	Copa del Rey
1987–88	5	Reg. Pref.	6th	
1988–89	5	Reg. Pref.	9th	
1989–90	5	Reg. Pref.	4th	
1990–91	5	Reg. Pref.	14th	
1991–92	6	1ª Reg.	13th	
1992–93	6	1ª Reg.	3rd	
1993–94	6	1ª Reg.	4th	
1994–95	6	1ª Reg.	4th	
1995–96	6	1ª Reg.	2nd	
1996–97	5	Reg. Pref.	9th	
1997–98	5	Reg. Pref.	7th	
1998–99	5	Reg. Pref.	5th	
1999–2000	5	Reg. Pref.	6th	
2000–01	5	Reg. Pref.	11th	
2001–02	5	Reg. Pref.	14th	
2002–03	5	Reg. Pref.	10th	
2003–04	5	Reg. Pref.	5th	
2004–05	5	Reg. Pref.	4th	
2005–06	5	Reg. Pref.	12th	
2006–07	5	Reg. Pref.	6th	

Season	Tier	Division	Place	Copa del Rey
2007–08	5	Reg. Pref.	2nd	
2008–09	4	3ª	15th	
2009–10	4	3ª	11th	
2010–11	4	3ª	16th	
2011–12	4	3ª	18th	
2012–13	5	Reg. Pref.	5th	
2013–14	5	Reg. Pref.	13th	
2014–15	5	Reg. Pref.	10th	
2015–16	5	Reg. Pref.	14th	
2016–17	5	Reg. Pref.	14th	
2017–18	5	Reg. Pref.	16th	
2018–19	6	1ª Reg.	4th	
2019–20	6	1ª Reg.	3rd	
2020–21	5	Reg. Pref.	1st	
2021–22	5	3ª RFEF	16th	
2022–23	6	Reg. Pref.	14th	
2023–24	7	1ª Reg.	17th	
2024–25	8	2ª Reg.	4th	
2025–26	7	1ª Reg.	17th	
2026–27	8	2ª Reg.		

- 4 seasons in Tercera División
- 1 season in Tercera División RFEF
