= UD Son Verí =

Son Verí
- Full name: Unión Deportiva Son Verí
- Founded: 24 September 2002; 23 years ago
- Ground: Camp Municipal S'Arenal, Llucmajor, Mallorca, Spain
- Capacity: 2,000
- President: Arturo Para Mir
- Manager: Arturo Para Mir
- League: Preferente Regional – Mallorca
- 2025–26: División de Honor – Mallorca, 17th of 18 (relegated)
Home colours	Away colours

Unión Deportiva Son Verí is a Spanish football team based in Son Verí Nou, Llucmajor, in the autonomous community of the Balearic Islands. Founded in 2002, they play in Preferente Regional – Mallorca, holding home matches at Camp de Futbol Municipal de S'Arenal, with a capacity of 2,000 people.

== On 24 September 2002, the club was founded, but only started a senior team in 2014. ==
After achieving three promotions in their first three senior seasons, Son Verí achieved a first-ever promotion to Tercera División RFEF in June 2021, after defeating CE Sineu in the promotion play-offs.

== Season to season ==
Season	Tier	Division	Place	Copa del Rey
2014–15	8	3ª Reg.	1st	
2015–16	7	2ª Reg.	2nd	
2016–17	6	1ª Reg.	3rd	
2017–18	5	Reg. Pref.	14th	
2018–19	5	Reg. Pref.	6th	
2019–20	5	Reg. Pref.	11th	
2020–21	5	Reg. Pref.	3rd	
2021–22	5	3ª RFEF	21st	
2022–23	6	Reg. Pref.	9th	
2023–24	6	Reg. Pref.	3rd	
2024–25	6	Div. Hon.	17th	
2025–26	6	Div. Hon.		

- 1 season in Tercera División RFEF
