= CD Ribert =

Association football club in Spain

Ribert
- Full name: Club Deportivo Ribert
- Founded: 2017
- Ground: El Tori, Salamanca, Castile and León, Spain
- Capacity: 1,000
- President: Pedro Luis Hernández
- Manager: Juanfran
- League: Primera Regional – Group B
- 2025–26: Primera Provincial – Salamanca, 1st of 14 (champions)
Home colours	Away colours

Club Deportivo Ribert is a Spanish football club based in Salamanca, in the autonomous community of Castile and León. Founded in 2017, they play in Primera Regional – Group B, holding home games at Campo Municipal El Tori, with a capacity of 1,000 people.

== History ==
Founded in 2017 as a replacement to dissolved RCD Ribert, the club achieved promotion in their first senior season, and merged with CD Barrio El Zurguén in 2018. In June 2021, the club achieved a first-ever promotion to Tercera División RFEF.

== Season to season ==
Season	Tier	Division	Place	Copa del Rey
2017–18	6	1ª Prov.	1st	
2018–19	5	1ª Reg.	5th	
2019–20	5	1ª Reg.	6th	
2020–21	5	1ª Reg.	1st	
2021–22	5	3ª RFEF	14th	
2022–23	6	1ª Reg.	7th	
2023–24	6	1ª Reg.	10th	
2024–25	6	1ª Reg.	14th	
2025–26	7	1ª Prov.	1st	
2026–27	6	1ª Reg.		

- 1 season in Tercera División RFEF
