= Athletic Club Torrellano =

Spanish football club

Athletic Torrellano
- Full name: Athletic Club Torrellano
- Founded: 2012; 14 years ago
- Ground: Isabel Fernández, Torrellano, Elche, Valencian Community, Spain
- Capacity: 2,000
- President: Ángel Valero
- Manager: Óscar Díaz
- League: Tercera Federación – Group 6
- 2025–26: Tercera Federación – Group 6, 9th of 18
Home colours	Away colours

Athletic Club Torrellano is a Spanish football team based in Torrellano, Elche, in the Valencian Community. Founded in 2012, they play in the Tercera Federación – Group 6, holding home matches at the Campo Municipal Isabel Fernández, with a capacity of 2,000 people.

== History ==
Founded in 2012 as a replacement to Torrellano Illice CF, dissolved a year earlier, Athletic Torrellano began playing in the Segunda Regional, and achieved promotion in 2015. After being back to the seventh tier in 2017, the club achieved two consecutive promotions to reach the Regional Preferente.

On 27 June 2021, after two seasons in Preferente, Athletic Torrellano achieved a first-ever promotion a national division, joining the new fifth tier Tercera División RFEF.

== Season to season ==
Season	Tier	Division	Place	Copa del Rey
2012–13	7	2ª Reg.	9th	
2013–14	7	2ª Reg.	4th	
2014–15	7	2ª Reg.	2nd	
2015–16	6	1ª Reg.	13th	
2016–17	6	1ª Reg.	15th	
2017–18	7	2ª Reg.	1st	
2018–19	6	1ª Reg.	1st	
2019–20	5	Reg. Pref.	9th	
2020–21	5	Reg. Pref.	2nd	
2021–22	5	3ª RFEF	10th	
2022–23	5	3ª Fed.	7th	
2023–24	5	3ª Fed.	10th	
2024–25	5	3ª Fed.	15th	
2025–26	5	3ª Fed.	9th	
2026–27	5	3ª Fed.		

- 6 seasons in Tercera Federación/Tercera División RFEF
