= CF Santa Anastasia =

Spanish football team

Santa Anastasia
- Full name: Club de Fútbol Santa Anastasia
- Founded: 1968
- Ground: Fontanazas, Santa Anastasia, Ejea de los Caballeros, Aragon, Spain
- Capacity: 1,000
- President: Ángel Jiménez
- Manager: Carlos Castro
- League: Regional Preferente – Group 1
- 2024–25: Regional Preferente – Group 1, 6th of 18
Home colours	Away colours

Club de Fútbol Santa Anastasia is a Spanish football team based in Santa Anastasia, Ejea de los Caballeros, in the community of Aragon. Founded in 1968, they play in Regional Preferente – Group 1, holding home matches at Estadio Fontanazas.

== History ==
Founded in 1968, Santa Anastasia only started a senior team in the 1980s. In June 2021, the club achieved a first-ever promotion to Tercera División RFEF.

== Season to season ==
Season	Tier	Division	Place	Copa del Rey
1981–82	7	2ª Reg.	12th	
1982–83	7	2ª Reg.	8th	
1983–84	7	2ª Reg.	5th	
1984–85	7	2ª Reg.	2nd	
1985–86	7	2ª Reg.	3rd	
1986–87	7	2ª Reg.	1st	
1987–88	6	1ª Reg.	6th	
1988–89	6	1ª Reg.	2nd	
1989–90	5	Reg. Pref.	12th	
1990–91	5	Reg. Pref.	2nd	
1991–92	5	Reg. Pref.	13th	
1992–93	5	Reg. Pref.	9th	
1993–94	5	Reg. Pref.	15th	
1994–95	6	1ª Reg.	11th	
1995–96	6	1ª Reg.	9th	
1996–97	6	1ª Reg.	3rd	
1997–98	5	Reg. Pref.	18th	
1998–99	6	1ª Reg.	6th	
1999–2000	6	1ª Reg.	4th	
2000–01	6	1ª Reg.	8th	

Season	Tier	Division	Place	Copa del Rey
2001–02	6	1ª Reg.	9th	
2002–03	6	1ª Reg.	1st	
2003–04	5	Reg. Pref.	9th	
2004–05	5	Reg. Pref.	11th	
2005–06	5	Reg. Pref.	12th	
2006–07	5	Reg. Pref.	16th	
2007–08	6	1ª Reg.	1st	
2008–09	5	Reg. Pref.	14th	
2009–10	5	Reg. Pref.	18th	
2010–11	6	1ª Reg.	10th	
2011–12	6	1ª Reg.	8th	
2012–13	6	1ª Reg.	2nd	
2013–14	5	Reg. Pref.	18th	
2014–15	6	1ª Reg.	8th	
2015–16	6	1ª Reg.	11th	
2016–17	6	1ª Reg.	14th	
2017–18	6	1ª Reg.	1st	
2018–19	5	Reg. Pref.	4th	
2019–20	5	Reg. Pref.	3rd	
2020–21	5	Reg. Pref.	1st	

Season	Tier	Division	Place	Copa del Rey
2021–22	5	3ª RFEF	14th	
2022–23	6	Reg. Pref.	5th	
2023–24	6	Reg. Pref.	5th	
2024–25	6	Reg. Pref.	6th	
2025–26	6	Reg. Pref.		

- 1 season in Tercera División RFEF
