= Larrabetzu =

- Municipality
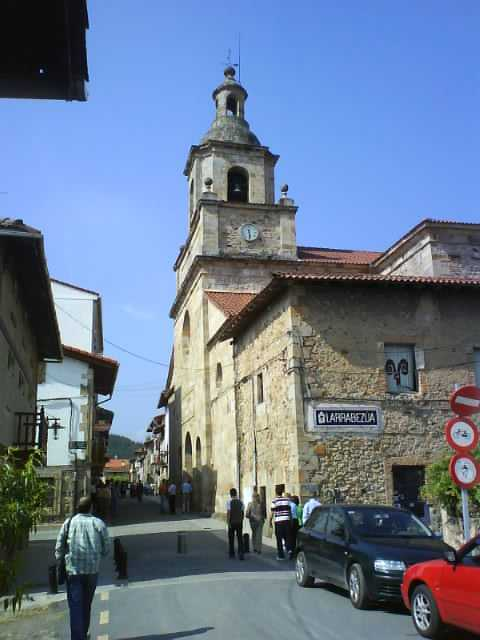
- Parish church.

- Flag Coat of arms

- Location in Spain Larrabetzu (Spain)
- Coordinates: 43°15′43″N 2°47′41″W
- Country: Spain
- Autonomous community: Basque Country
- Province: Biscay
- Comarca: Greater Bilbao

Government
  - Mayor: Tomas Ordeñana

Area
  - Total: 21.39 km^{2} (8.26 sq mi)
- Elevation: 73 m (240 ft)

Population (2025-01-01)
  - Total: 2,039
  - Density: 95.32/km^{2} (246.9/sq mi)
- Demonym: Larrabetzuarra
- Time zone: UTC+1 (CET)
  - Summer (DST): UTC+2 (CEST)
- Postal code: 48195
- Website: Official website]

Larrabetzu is a town and municipality located in the province of Biscay, in the autonomous community of Basque Country, northern Spain.
