= Don Álvaro =

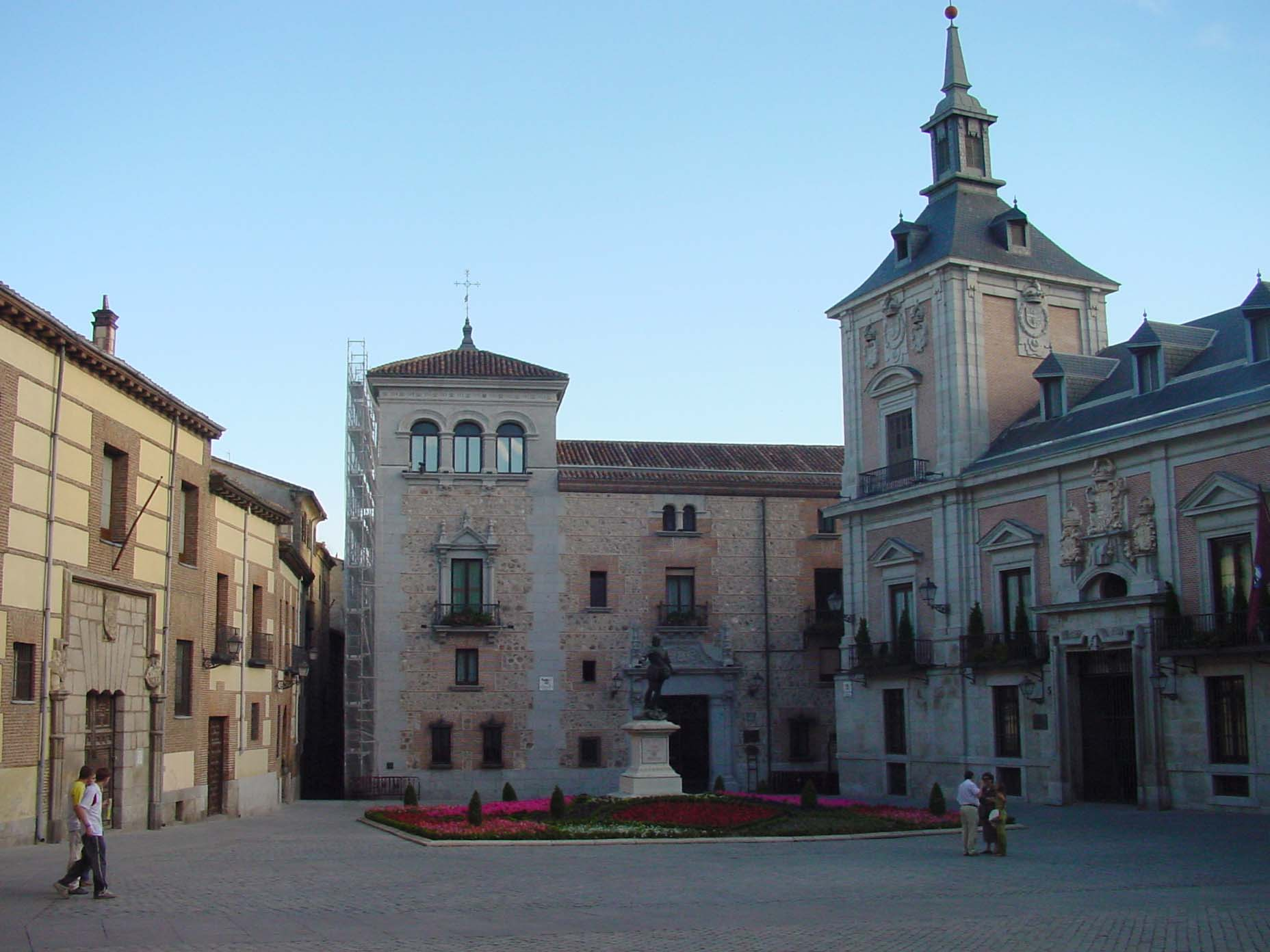
- Town hall

- Coat of arms

- Location of Don Álvaro within Extremadura
- Coordinates: 38°50′55″N 6°16′29″W
- Country: Spain
- Autonomous community: Extremadura
- Province: Badajoz
- Municipality: Don Álvaro

Area
  - Total: 32 km^{2} (12 sq mi)
- Elevation: 255 m (837 ft)

Population (2025-01-01)
  - Total: 841
  - Density: 26/km^{2} (68/sq mi)
- Time zone: UTC+1 (CET)
  - Summer (DST): UTC+2 (CEST)

Don Álvaro is a municipality located in the province of Badajoz, Extremadura, Spain. According to the 2012 census (INE), the municipality has a population of 758 inhabitants.

Don Álvaro (Tarfe) is the name of the principal characters in another version of the second book of Don Quixote published by Alonso Fernández de Avellaneda in Tarragona in 1614.

In 2012 an English translation of Don Alvaro was adapted by Paul Pinto & Judith Pinto and published by United Writers Publications Ltd.

== See also ==
- List of municipalities in Badajoz
