= 2026 Copa Federación de España =

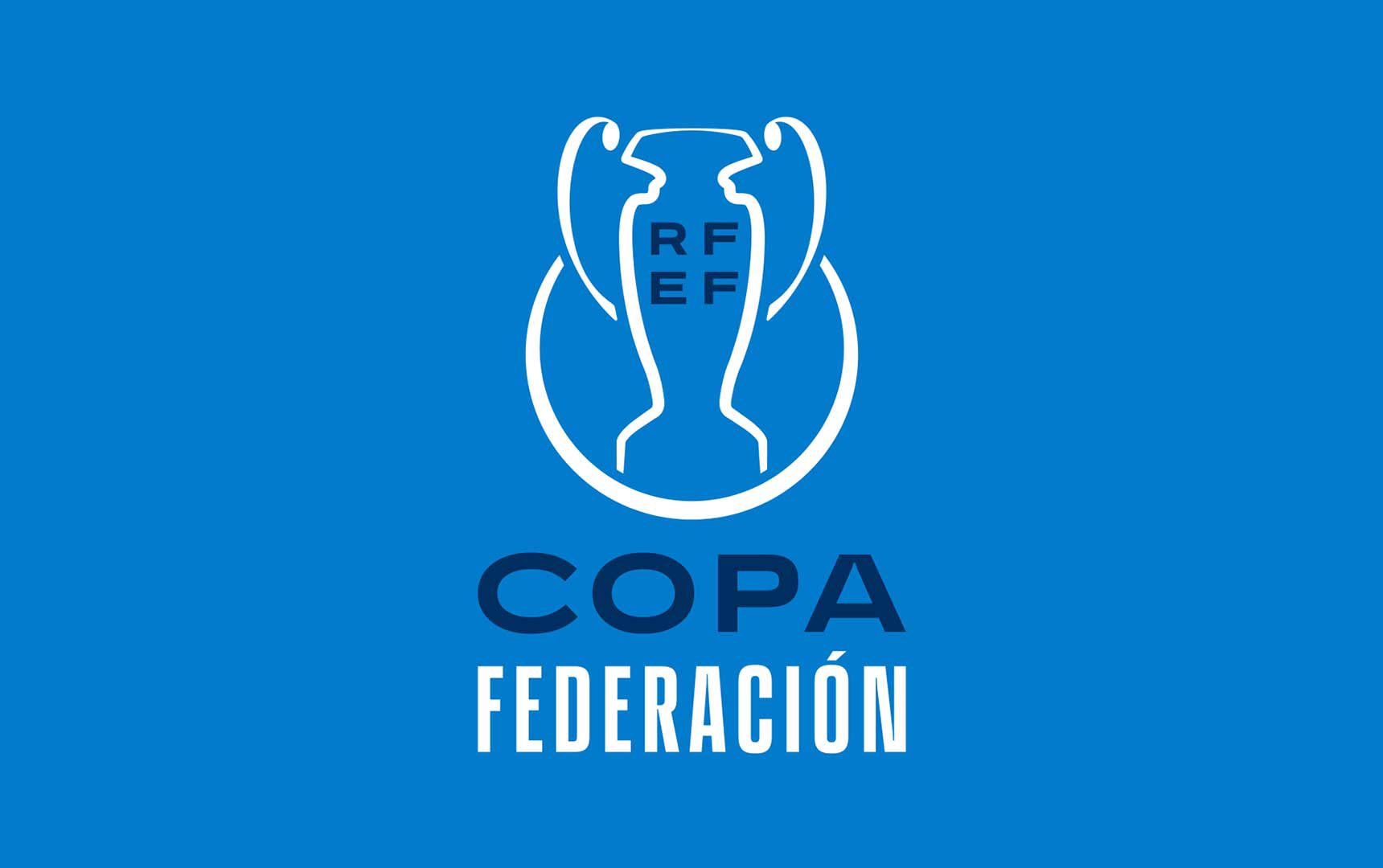

Tournament details
- Country: Spain
- Teams: 32 (in national phase)

Final positions
- Champions: Sestao River

The 2026 Copa Federación de España will be the 34th edition of the Copa Federación de España, also known as Copa RFEF, a knockout competition for Spanish football clubs. The competition will start in August with the first games of the Regional stages and will end in November with the final of the National tournament. Like previous years, the four semifinalists will qualify for the Copa del Rey first round.

== Regional tournaments ==
=== Andalusia tournament ===
The Royal Andalusian Football Federation (RFAF) decided to create the 'Copa RFAF' in 2020. The finalists of this competition will be selected as the Andalusian representatives in the national phase of Copa RFEF. In this edition, the final between the winners has been eliminated.

==== Eastern Andalusia ====
Semi-finals
16 and 19 August
San Pedro (5) (p) (5–3)	0	1	1
Marbellí (5)	1	0	1

Final
23 and 30 August
San Pedro (5) (p) (5–4)	1	1	2
Arenas (5)	1	1	2

==== Final ====
23 August	San Pedro (5)	1–1	Arenas (5)	San Pedro Alcántara, Marbella
19:30	José Manuel Gallego 19'	Report	Alejandro Cabello 30'	Stadium: Municipal; Referee: Iker García Valero

30 August	Arenas (5)	1–1 (4–5 p)	San Pedro (5)	Armilla
20:00	Antonio Jesús Ramos 'Gato' 90+1'	Report	Iddriss Alhassan 88'	Stadium: Municipal; Referee: Manuel Polaino Redondo

==== Western Andalusia ====
Semi-finals
16 and 19 August
Pozoblanco (5)	1	0	1
Conil (5)	2	0	2
16 and 19 August
San Roque Lepe (5)	1	0	1
Bollullos (5)	2	1	3

Final
23 and 30 August
Conil (5) (p) (2–1)	0	1	1
Bollullos (5)	1	0	1

==== Final ====
23 August	Conil (5)	0–1	Bollullos (5)	Conil
20:00		Report	Manuel Romero 67'	Stadium: José Antonio Pérez Ureba; Referee: Saúl González Vargas

30 August	Bollullos (5)	0–1 (1–2 p)	Conil (5)	Bollullos Par del Condado
20:00		Report	Cristian Orihuela 42'	Stadium: Eloy Ávila Cano; Referee: Alfredo Vázquez Hidalgo

=== Aragon tournament ===
Four teams joined the tournament: Binéfar (5), Ejea (4), Épila (5) and La Almunia (5). A two-round mini-league will be played, with the top two finishers qualifying for the final.

Pos	Team	Pld	W	D	L	GF	GA	GD	Pts	Qualification	BIN	EJE	EPI	LAL
1	Binéfar	2	0	2	0	0	0	0	2	Qualification to the Final	—	0–0	-	-
2	Ejea	2	0	2	0	0	0	0	2	Qualification to the Final	-	—	0–0	-
3	Épila	2	0	2	0	0	0	0	2		-	-	—	0–0
4	La Almunia	2	0	2	0	0	0	0	2		0–0	-	-	—

Updated to match(es) played on 23 August. Source: Federación Aragonesa de Fútbol

As it turned out, all four matches played ended in 0–0 draws. Consequently, every team finished with two points and an identical goal difference. To break the tie, the results of penalty shootouts had to be taken into account. Binéfar won both of their shootouts, thereby finishing as the undisputed leader. However, Ejea and Épila each won one penalty shootout, resulting in a tie for second place. Since the Ejea team won the penalty shootout against Épila, it initially appeared they had secured a spot in the final. However, it has since been clarified that the tie is absolute and they needed a tiebreaker match, played in Épila 27 August, drawing 0–0 again and Ejea winning 5–4 in penalty shootout.

==== Final ====
30 August	Binéfar (5)	1–1 (4–1 p)	Ejea (4)	Binéfar
19:00	Adrià De Mesa 13' (pen.)	Report	Babacar Fedior 37' (pen.)	Stadium: Nuevo Los Olmos; Referee: Rubén Álvarez Abadías

=== Asturias tournament ===
12 teams joined the tournament. The draw was made 6 July and the tournament started 15 August. Final phase will be played at Estadio Miramar in Luanco.

Pot 1	Pot 2	Pot 3
Marino Luanco (4); Langreo (5); Lealtad (5); Caudal (5)	Mosconia (5); San Martín (5); L'Entregu (5); Ceares (5)	Praviano (5); Siero (5); Colunga (5); Llanes (5)

==== Group stage ====
===== Group A =====
Pos	Team	Pld	W	D	L	GF	GA	GD	Pts	Qualification	CAU	PRA	ENT
1	Caudal	2	1	1	0	3	1	+2	4	Qualification to semifinals	—	1–1	–
2	Praviano	2	1	1	0	2	1	+1	4		–	—	1–0
3	L'Entregu	2	0	0	2	0	3	−3	0		0–2	–	—

Updated to match(es) played on 23 August. Source: Fútbol Asturiano

===== Group B =====
Pos	Team	Pld	W	D	L	GF	GA	GD	Pts	Qualification	MAR	MOS	COL
1	Marino Luanco	2	2	0	0	6	3	+3	6	Qualification to semifinals	—	–	2–0
2	Mosconia	2	1	0	1	5	4	+1	3		3–4	—	–
3	Colunga	2	0	0	2	0	4	−4	0		–	0–2	—

Updated to match(es) played on 22 August. Source: Fútbol Asturiano

===== Group C =====
Pos	Team	Pld	W	D	L	GF	GA	GD	Pts	Qualification	SIE	LAN	SMA
1	Siero	2	1	1	0	5	3	+2	4	Qualification to semifinals	—	–	3–1
2	Langreo	2	0	2	0	3	3	0	2		2–2	—	–
3	San Martín	2	0	1	1	2	4	−2	1		–	1–1	—

Updated to match(es) played on 23 August. Source: Fútbol Asturiano

===== Group D =====
Pos	Team	Pld	W	D	L	GF	GA	GD	Pts	Qualification	LEA	LLA	CEA
1	Lealtad	2	2	0	0	4	0	+4	6	Qualification to semifinals	—	2–0	—
2	Llanes	2	0	1	1	0	2	−2	1		—	—	0–0
3	Ceares	2	0	1	1	0	2	−2	1		0–2	—	—

Updated to match(es) played on 22 August. Source: Fútbol Asturiano

==== Final phase ====
Semi-finals
26 August - Luanco
Caudal (5) (p)	2 (4)
Marino Luanco (4)	2 (3)
27 August - Luanco
Siero (5)	0
Lealtad (5)	4

Final
30 August - Luanco
Caudal (5) (p)	0 (4)
Lealtad (5)	0 (3)

==== Final ====
30 August	Caudal (5)	0–0 (4–3 p)	Lealtad (5)	Luanco
19:00		Report		Stadium: Miramar; Attendance: 550; Referee: Jaime Ruiz Álvarez

=== Balearic Islands tournament ===
Two teams joined the tournament.

==== Final ====
14 August	Porreres (5)	2–0	SD Ibiza (5)	Porreres
17:30	Alberto Villapalos 37'; Alberto Sastre 49' (pen.)	Report		Stadium: Ses Forques; Referee: Miguel Cifre Soria

=== Basque Country tournament ===
3 teams joined the tournament: Derio (5), San Ignacio (5) and Sodupe (5).

Pos	Team	Pld	W	D	L	GF	GA	GD	Pts	Qualification	DER	SOD	SAI
1	Derio	2	1	1	0	5	3	+2	4	Qualification to the National Phase	—	–	3–1
2	Sodupe	2	1	1	0	4	3	+1	4		2–2	—	–
3	San Ignacio	2	0	0	2	2	5	−3	0		–	1–2	—

Updated to match(es) played on 26 August. Source: Federación Vasca de Fútbol

=== Canary Islands tournament ===
Four teams joined the tournament: Atalaya (6), Laguna (5), Mensajero (5) and Telde (6).

Semi-finals
18 August
Mensajero (5) (p)	1 (4)
Laguna (5)	1 (2)
18 August
Atalaya (6)	2
Telde (6)	4

Final
25 August
Mensajero (5)	7
Telde (6)	1

==== Final ====
25 August	Mensajero (5)	7–1	Telde (6)	Santa Cruz de la Palma
17:00	Michael Barroso Santana 4', 48'; Óscar González Hernández 9'; Adrián Machín Arrocha 29', 57'; John Kelly Gutiérrez Reyes 59', 88'	Report	Adrián Jesús Santana Sánchez 9'	Stadium: Silvestre Carrillo; Referee: Matías González Beux

=== Cantabria tournament ===
Eight teams joined the tournament.

Quarter-finals
15 August
Tropezón (5)	1
Barquereño (5)	0
15 August
Vimenor (5) (p)	1 (6)
Atlético Albericia (5)	1 (5)
15 August
Guarnizo (5)	0
Torina (5)	3
15 August
Escobedo (5) (p)	0 (5)
Cayón (5)	0 (4)

Semi-finals
22 August
Tropezón (5)	0
Vimenor (5)	1
22 August
Torina (5)	2
Escobedo (5)	1

Final
30 August - Bezana
Vimenor (5) (p)	0 (4)
Torina (5)	0 (3)

==== Final ====
30 August	Vimenor (5)	0–0 (4–3 p)	Torina (5)	Bezana
19:00		Report		Stadium: Municipal; Referee: Benito González Barruetabeña

=== Castile and León tournament ===
3 teams joined the tournament: Palencia (5), Santa Marta (5) and Villaralbo (5). The draw was made 8 July.

Pos	Team	Pld	W	D	L	GF	GA	GD	Pts	Qualification	MAR	PAL	VIL
1	Santa Marta	2	2	0	0	4	1	+3	6	Qualification to the National phase	—	—	2–0
2	Palencia	2	1	0	1	3	2	+1	3		1–2	—	–
3	Villaralbo	2	0	0	2	0	4	−4	0		–	0–2	—

Updated to match(es) played on 30 August. Source: Real Federación de Castilla y León de Fútbol

=== Castile-La Mancha tournament ===
Eight teams joined the tournament.

Quarter-finals
8 August
Villarrubia (5)	0
Manchego (5)	1
6 August
Villacañas (5)	0
Talavera (4)	3
8 August
Toledo (5)	0 (2)
Guadalajara (4) (p)	0 (3)
8 August
Quintanar del Rey (5)	1
San Clemente (5)	0

Semi-finals
12 August
Manchego (5)	1 (3)
Talavera (4) (p)	1 (5)
12 August
Guadalajara (4)	1
Quintanar del Rey (5)	0

Final
16 August
Talavera (4)	2
Guadalajara (4)	1

==== Final ====
16 August	Talavera (4)	2–1	Guadalajara (4)	Talavera de la Reina
21:00	Sergio Benito 12', 75' (pen.)	Report	Santi Miguélez 31' (pen.)	Stadium: El Prado; Attendance: 3.000; Referee: Ruipérez Marín

=== Catalonia tournament ===
L'Hospitalet (5) and Vilanova (5) joined the tournament.

19 August	Vilanova (5)	2–2 (a.e.t.) (2–4 p)	L'Hospitalet (5)	Vilanova i la Geltrú
19:00	Josep Señé 16' (pen.), 30'	Report	Rubén Enri 14'; Antonio Pelegrín 74'	Stadium: Municipal; Referee: Lluís Quero Batalla

=== Extremadura tournament ===
Eight teams joined the tournament. The first-round pairings were assigned based on criteria of geographical proximity.

Quarter-finals
2 August
Santa Amalia (5)	1
Cacereño (3)	2
2 August
Guadiana (5)	0
Gévora (5)	1
2 August
Quintana (5)	0
Villanovense (5)	2
1 August
Castuera (5)	1
Cabeza del Buey (5)	0

Semi-finals
8 August
Cacereño (3)	2
Gévora (5)	1
9 August
Villanovense (5)	1
Castuera (5)	0

Final
16 August - Zafra
Cacereño (3) (a.e.t.) (p)	1 (4)
Villanovense (5)	1 (2)

==== Final ====
16 August	Cacereño (3)	1–1 (a.e.t.) (4–2 p)	Villanovense (5)	Zafra
20:00	Gete 43'	Report	Edu Reyes 70'	Stadium: Nuevo Estadio; Referee: Picón Domínguez

=== Galicia tournament ===
16 teams joined the tournament. The draw was made 15 July.

First Round
1 August
Lalín (5)	0
Estradense (5)	1
-
Racing Villalbés (5) w/o
Lugo (3)
2 August
Atlético Arteixo (5)	0
Silva (5)	2
1 August
Montañeros (5)	1
Bergantiños (4)	3
2 August
Antela (5)	2
Gran Peña (5)	1
-
Ourense CF (4) w/o
Arenteiro (5)
-
Portonovo (5) w/o
Alondras (5)
-
Boiro (5) w/o
Céltiga (5)

Quarter-finals
5 August
Estradense (5)	1 (2)
Racing Villalbés (5) (p)	1 (4)
7 August
Silva (5)	0
Bergantiños (4)	2
9 August
Antela (5)	1
Ourense CF (4)	0
-
Portonovo (5)
Boiro (5) w/o

Semi-finals
14 August
Racing Villalbés (5)	0
Bergantiños (4)	8
16 August
Antela (5)	0
Boiro (5)	1

Final
22 August - Noia
Bergantiños (4)	3
Boiro (5)	1

==== Final ====
22 August	Bergantiños (4)	3–1	Boiro (5)	Noia
18:00	Tomás Fuentes 7'; Ale Sánchez 23'; Yago Gandoy 90'	Report	Mateo Lago 90+2'	Stadium: Julio Mato; Attendance: 500; Referee: David Táboas Lagoa

=== La Rioja tournament ===
Four teams joined the tournament. The draw was made 21 July.

Semi-finals
23 August
SD Logroñés (4)	0 (3)
Calahorra (5) (p)	0 (4)
23 August
La Calzada (5)	1
Comillas (5)	2

Final
30 August
Calahorra (5)	0 (4)
Comillas (5) (p)	0 (5)

=== Madrid tournament ===
8 teams joined the tournament: Fuenlabrada (5), Las Rozas (5), México FC (5), Moscardó (5), Navalcarnero (4), Siello (5), Torrejón (5) and Unión Adarve (5). The draw was made 9 July and tournament started 12 August.

==== Group A ====
Pos	Team	Pld	W	D	L	GF	GA	GD	Pts	Qualification	NAV	TOR	ADA	SIE
1	Navalcarnero	3	3	0	0	7	0	+7	9	Qualification to the final	—	1–0	–	5–0
2	Torrejón	3	1	1	1	2	2	0	4		–	—	1–1	—
3	Unión Adarve	3	0	2	1	1	2	−1	2		0–1	–	—	–
4	Siello	3	0	1	2	0	6	−6	1		–	0–1	0–0	—

Updated to match(es) played on 16 August. Source: Real Federación de Fútbol de Madrid

==== Group B ====
Pos	Team	Pld	W	D	L	GF	GA	GD	Pts	Qualification	ROZ	FUE	MOS	MEX
1	Las Rozas	3	1	2	0	2	1	+1	5	Qualification to the final	—	—	1–0	–
2	Fuenlabrada	3	1	2	0	2	1	+1	5		0–0	—	–	0–0
3	Moscardó	3	1	0	2	4	4	0	3		—	1–2	—	3–1
4	México FC	3	0	2	1	2	4	−2	2		1–1	–	—	—

Updated to match(es) played on 15 August. Source: Real Federación de Fútbol de Madrid

==== Final ====
23 August	Las Rozas (5)	0–2	Navalcarnero (4)	Madrid
11:00		Report	Kensly Vázquez 69'; Roberto Álvarez 74'	Stadium: Ernesto Cotorruelo; Referee: Raúl de la Mata

=== Murcia tournament ===
9 teams joined the tournament: Alcantarilla (5), Cotillas CD (5), Los Garres (5), Mazarrón (5), Minerva (5), Murcia (3), Olímpico Totana (5), UCAM Murcia (4) and Unión Molinense (5). The draw was made 24 June.

Preliminary round
12 August
Unión Molinense (5)	0
UCAM Murcia (4)	1

Quarter-finals
14 August
Los Garres (5)	0
Olímpico Totana (5)	2
16 August
Cotillas CD (5)	1
Minerva (5)	0
16 August
Murcia (3)	2
Mazarrón (5)	0
15 August
UCAM Murcia (4)	4
Alcantarilla (5)	0

Semi-finals
19 August
Olímpico Totana (5)	0
Cotillas CD (5)	1
19 August
Murcia (3)	0 (4)
UCAM Murcia (4)	0 (2)

Final
23 August
Cotillas CD (5)	1
Murcia (3)	2

==== Final ====
23 August	Cotillas CD (5)	1–2	Murcia (3)	Murcia
20:30	Sergio Martínez 'Caravanas' 1'	Report	Álvaro Bustos 28'; Óscar Gil 56'	Stadium: Enrique Roca; Referee: Fulgencio Madrid Martínez

=== Navarre tournament ===
Four teams joined the tournament. The draw was made 4 August.

Semi-finals
26 August
Cirbonero (5)	2
Huarte (5)	1
26 August
San Juan (5)	2
Izarra (5)	0

Final
30 August - Tafalla
Cirbonero (5)	0
San Juan (5)	1

==== Final ====
30 August	Cirbonero (5)	0–1	San Juan (5)	Tafalla
19:00				Stadium: San Francisco

=== Valencian Community tournament ===
Intercity (4), Roda (5) and Torrent (5) joined the tournament. The tournament was played as a "3-in-1" triangular competition over a single day at a neutral venue. The event will consist of three 45-minute matches, with the three teams facing each other in a round-robin format.

29 August	Intercity (4)	0–0 (5–4 p)	Roda (5)	Picassent
19:00		Report		Stadium: Miguel Monleón; Referee: José Carballa

29 August	Roda (5)	0–1	Torrent (5)	Picassent
20:10		Report	Adrián Lois 7'	Stadium: Miguel Monleón; Referee: Adrián Goñi

29 August	Torrent (5)	0–0	Intercity (4)	Picassent
21:20		Report		Stadium: Miguel Monleón; Referee: José Carballa

== National phase ==
The national phase will start 9 September with 32 teams (20 winners of the Regional Tournaments, the best 5 teams from 2025–26 Segunda Federación not yet qualified for the 2026–27 Copa del Rey and the best 7 teams from the 2025–26 Tercera Federación not yet qualified for the 2026–27 Copa del Rey). The four semi-finalists will qualify for the 2026–27 Copa del Rey first round.

=== Qualified teams ===
- 5 best teams from 2025–26 Segunda Federación not yet qualified to 2026–27 Copa del Rey

- (Valencian Community) Orihuela (4)
- (Andalusia) Recreativo (4)
- (Castile and León) Salamanca (4)
- (Basque Country (autonomous community)) Sestao River (4)
- (Catalonia) Terrassa (4)

- 7 best teams from 2025–26 Tercera Federación not yet qualified to 2026–27 Copa del Rey

- (Valencian Community) Atlético Saguntino (5)
- (Catalonia) Badalona (5)
- (Galicia (Spain)) Compostela (4)
- (Andalusia) Dos Hermanas (5)
- (Basque Country (autonomous community)) Leioa (5)
- (Andalusia) Motril (5)
- (Canary Islands) San Fernando (5)

- Winners of Autonomous Communities tournaments

- (Galicia (Spain)) Bergantiños (4)
- (Aragon) Binéfar (5)
- (Extremadura) Cacereño (3)
- (Asturias) Caudal (5)
- (La Rioja) Comillas (5)
- (Andalusia) Conil (5)
- (Basque Country (autonomous community)) Derio (5)
- Sporting de Ceuta (6)
- (Catalonia) L'Hospitalet (5)
- Melilla (5)
- (Canary Islands) Mensajero (5)
- (Region of Murcia) Murcia (3)
- (Community of Madrid) Navalcarnero (4)
- (Balearic Islands) Porreres (5)
- (Navarre) San Juan (5)
- (Andalusia) San Pedro (5)
- (Castile and León) Santa Marta (5)
- (Castilla–La Mancha) Talavera (4)
- (Valencian Community) Torrent (5)
- (Cantabria) Vimenor (5)

=== Draw ===
The draw was made at the RFEF headquarters on 31 August. The teams were divided into four pots based on geographical criteria. Each pot will be played independently until the semi-finals. There will be a draw for each qualifying round until the final.

Pot A	Pot B	Pot C	Pot D
(Asturias) Caudal (5) (Cantabria) Vimenor (5) (Castile and León) Salamanca (4) (Castile and León) Santa Marta (5) (Galicia (Spain)) Bergantiños (4) (Galicia (Spain)) Compostela (4) (Basque Country (autonomous community)) Derio (5) (Basque Country (autonomous community)) Leioa (5)	(Aragon) Binéfar (5) (Balearic Islands) Porreres (5) (Basque Country (autonomous community)) Sestao River (4) (Catalonia) Badalona (5) (Catalonia) L'Hospitalet (5) (Catalonia) Terrassa (4) (La Rioja) Comillas (5) (Navarre) San Juan (5)	(Canary Islands) Mensajero (5) (Canary Islands) San Fernando (5) (Castilla–La Mancha) Talavera (4) (Community of Madrid) Navalcarnero (4) (Region of Murcia) Murcia (3) (Valencian Community) Atlético Saguntino (5) (Valencian Community) Orihuela (4) (Valencian Community) Torrent (5)	(Andalusia) Conil (5) (Andalusia) Dos Hermanas (5) (Andalusia) Motril (5) (Andalusia) Recreativo (4) (Andalusia) San Pedro (5); Sporting de Ceuta (6) (Extremadura) Cacereño (3); Melilla (5)

=== Round of 32 ===
Pot A

9 September	Salamanca (4)	3–2 (a.e.t.)	Caudal (5)	Villares de la Reina
19:30	Urki Txoperena 71'; Juan Villegas 81'; Asier Domínguez 118'	Report	Juan Villegas 63' (o.g.); Cristian Acerete 75'	Stadium: Estadio Helmántico; Referee: Adrián Vega Portilla (Cantabria)

9 September	Bergantiños (4)	5–0	Leioa (5)	Carballo
19:00	Danil Ankudinov 45+1' (pen.); Jorge Saiz 49', 57'; José Balsa 66'; Kelechukwu Edeh 88'	Report		Stadium: As Eiroas; Attendance: 200; Referee: Juan Francisco Morato Vega (La Rioja)

9 September	Compostela (4)	1–1 (1–3 p)	Derio (5)	Santiago de Compostela
19:00				Stadium: San Lázaro

9 September	Santa Marta (5)	2–1	Vimenor (5)	Santa Marta de Tormes
19:00				Stadium: Alfonso San Casto

Pot B

9 September	Comillas (5)	3–2	L'Hospitalet (5)	Logroño
20:00				Stadium: Estadio Mundial 82

9 September	Badalona (5)	2–2 (1–3 p)	Sestao River (4)	Badalona
20:00				Stadium: Estadi Municipal

9 September	San Juan (5)	0–1 (a.e.t.)	Terrassa (4)	Pamplona
20:15				Stadium: San Juan

9 September	Binéfar (5)	1–0	Porreres (5)	Binéfar
16:30				Stadium: Los Olmos

Pot C

9 September	Torrent (5)	1–2	Atlético Saguntino (5)	Torrent
20:00				Stadium: San Gregorio

9 September	Talavera (4)	0–2 (a.e.t.)	Navalcarnero (4)	Talavera de la Reina
21:00				Stadium: Estadio El Prado

8 September	San Fernando (5)	1–3	Orihuela (4)	Maspalomas
11:00 WET				Stadium: Ciudad Deportiva

9 September	Mensajero (5)	1–2 (a.e.t.)	Murcia (3)	Santa Cruz de la Palma
19:00 WET				Stadium: Silvestre Carrillo

Pot D

9 September	Motril (5)	0–2	Recreativo (4)	Motril
20:30				Stadium: Escribano Castilla

9 September	Melilla (5)	0–1	Conil (5)	Melilla
17:30				Stadium: Álvarez Claro

9 September	Sporting de Ceuta (6)	0–9	Dos Hermanas (5)	Ceuta
18:00				Stadium: José Benoliel

9 September	Cacereño (3)	2–0	San Pedro (5)	Cáceres
21:00	Toño Calvo 37'; Runy 47'	Report		Stadium: Príncipe Felipe; Attendance: 1.900; Referee: Álvaro Rodríguez Recio (Madrid)

=== Round of 16 ===
The draw was made at the RFEF headquarters on 11 September.

Pot A

16 September	Derio (5)	3–5 (a.e.t.)	Salamanca (4)	Derio
19:45	Gálder Carreras 31' (pen.), 45+3' (pen.), 63'	Report	Aimar Vicandi 14'; Álex Caramelo 18', 42' (pen.); Jon Ander Barriga 113'; Larry Kelechi Opara 120+3'	Stadium: Ibaiondo; Referee: Fermín Rodríguez Pérez (Navarre)

16 September	Santa Marta (5)	1–0	Bergantiños (4)	Santa Marta de Tormes
19:00	Miguel Velázquez 67'	Report		Stadium: Alfonso San Casto; Referee: Miguel Gómez Carral (Cantabria)

Pot B

16 September	Terrassa (4)	4–0 (a.e.t.)	Binéfar (5)	Terrassa
19:30	Marcos Mendes 95', 113'; Jaime Barrero 110'; Max Marcet 120'	Report		Stadium: Estadi Olímpic; Referee: Ignacio Sanchez-Ferragut Calvet (Valencia)

16 September	Comillas (5)	1–2	Sestao River (4)	Logroño
19:30	Fernando Sáenz 77'	Report	Iñaki Sáenz de Viteri 'Legu' 36'; Ander Castillo 63'	Stadium: Estadio Mundial 82; Referee: Iván Bastián San Juan (Asturias)

Pot C

16 September	Orihuela (4)	1–4 (a.e.t.)	Murcia (3)	Orihuela
20:45	Álvaro Espínola 16'	Report	Alejandro Hernández Meca (penalty missed) 65'; Álvaro Giménez 87', 103'; Raúl Rubira 109'; Joel Jorquera 118'	Stadium: Los Arcos; Referee: Pablo Pérez Sánchez (Castile-La Mancha)

23 September (Note: The match was originally scheduled on 16 September 2026, but was postponed due to a weather warning for heavy rain.)	Atlético Saguntino (5)	0–4	Navalcarnero (4)	Sagunto
20:00		Report	Denis Andrei Corceovei 8'; Víctor Martín 43'; Pablo Agustín Bargallo 47', 83'	Stadium: Nou Camp de Morvedre; Referee: Xavier Alins Rodríguez (Catalonia)

Pot D

16 September	Recreativo (4)	2–1	Cacereño (3)	Huelva
20:30	Ale Marín 21' (pen.), 33'	Report	Víctor Manuel Castaño 'Runy' 88' (pen.)	Stadium: Nuevo Colombino; Referee: Cándido Jesús Rodríguez Tavío (Canary Islands)

16 September	Conil (5)	1–0	Dos Hermanas (5)	Conil de la Frontera
20:00	Cristian Orihuela 76'	Report		Stadium: Jose Antonio Pérez Ureba; Referee: Carlos Agraz Diaz (Extremadura)

=== Quarter-finals ===
The draw was made at the RFEF headquarters on 21 September. Winners of Quarter-finals qualified to the 2026–27 Copa del Rey first round.

Pot A

1 October	Santa Marta (5)	1–2	Salamanca (4)	Santa Marta de Tormes
19:30	Iker Hernández 45+4'	Report	William Peña 16' (pen.); Javier Murúa 23'	Stadium: Alfonso San Casto; Attendance: 1.885; Referee: Gorka Mazo Maruri (Castile and León)

Pot B

30 September	Sestao River (4)	4–1	Terrassa (4)	Sestao
19:00	Gonzalo Zorrilla 13'; Adrián Carrión 58'; Aser Palacios 60' (o.g.); Ander Castillo 69'	Report	Albert Celma 26'	Stadium: Las Llanas; Attendance: 3.700; Referee: David Ruiz Martín (Cantabria)

Pot C

30 September	Navalcarnero (4)	3–1	Murcia (3)	Navalcarnero
20:00	Mario Jiménez 51'; Álvaro Domínguez 55', 65'	Report	Alejandro Hernández Meca 52'	Stadium: Mariano González; Referee: Sebastián Roberto Pricopi Gogu (Castile-La Mancha)

Pot D

30 September	Recreativo (4)	2–1	Conil (5)	Huelva
20:30	Roan Riera 14'; Samuel Cruz Cortés 60'	Report	Germán Peinado 73'	Stadium: Nuevo Colombino; Referee: Abraham Gutiérrez Perera (Andalusia)

=== Semi-finals ===
14 October	Sestao River (4)	3–1	Salamanca (4)	Sestao
19:30				Stadium: Las Llanas

14 October	Recreativo (4)	2–2 (a.e.t.) (5–3 p)	Navalcarnero (4)	Huelva
20:30				Stadium: Nuevo Colombino

=== Final ===
14 November	Sestao River (4)	1–0	Recreativo (4)	Sestao
19:00		Report		Stadium: Las Llanas; Attendance: 4.090; Referee: Omar Álvarez Rodríguez (Castile and León)
