= 2023 Copa Federación de España =

Tournament details
- Country: Spain
- Teams: 32 (in national phase)

Final positions
- Champions: Badalona Futur (1st title)
- Runners-up: Talavera de la Reina

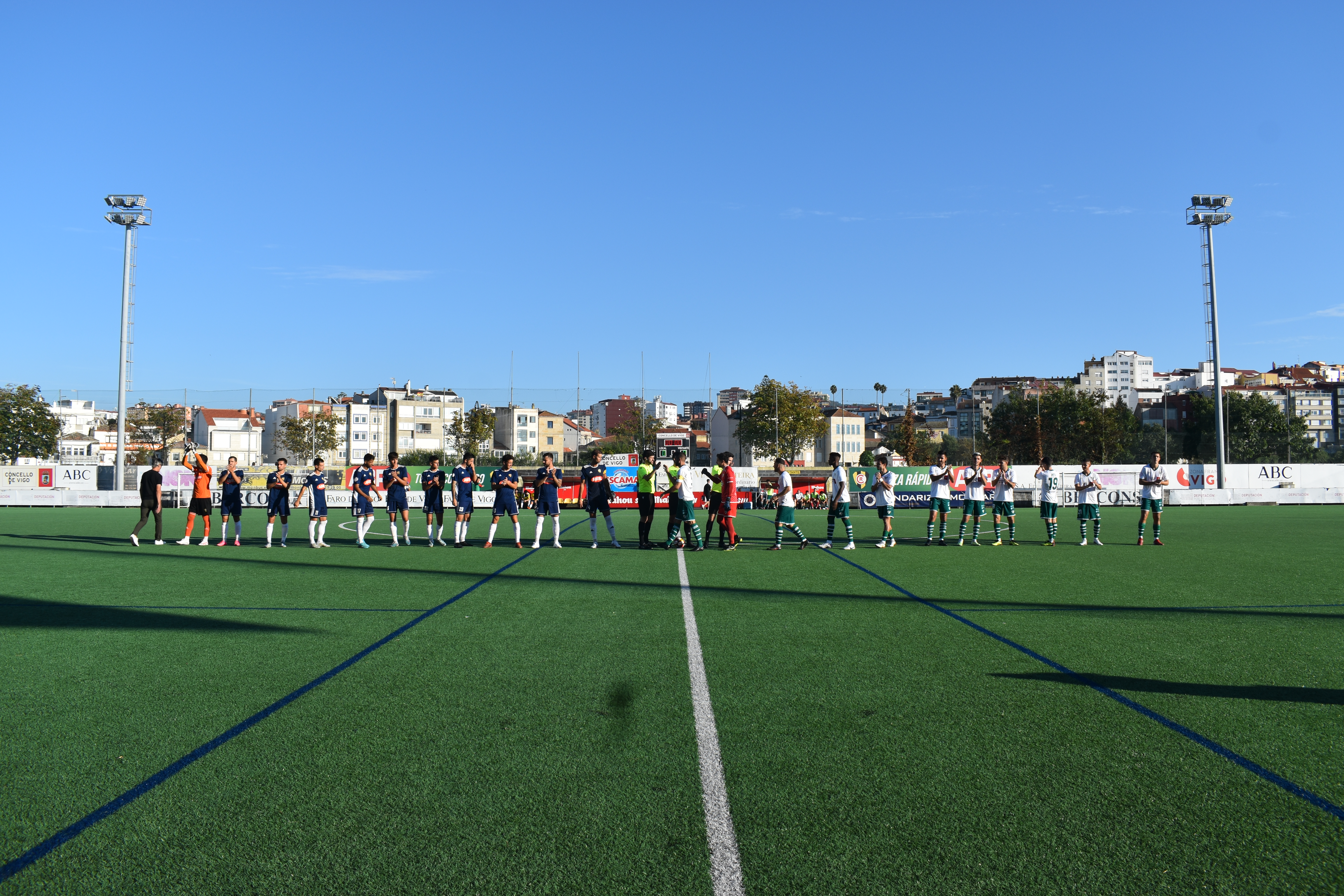
Rápido de Bouzas - Coruxo FC.

The 2023 Copa Federación de España was the 31st edition of the Copa Federación de España, also known as Copa RFEF, a knockout competition for Spanish football clubs.

The competition began in August with the first games of the Regional stages and ended on 22 November with the final of the National tournament. As part of the new competition format started in 2019, the four semifinalists qualified for the Copa del Rey first round.

== Regional tournaments ==
=== Andalusia tournament ===
The Royal Andalusian Football Federation (RFAF) decided to create the 'Copa RFAF' in 2020. The finalists of this competition were selected as the Andalusian representatives in the national phase of Copa RFEF.

Quarter-finals
16 and 20 August
Xerez (5) (4–2 p)	1	0	1
Ciudad de Lucena (5)	1	0	1
16 and 20 August
Atlético Espeleño (5)	1	1	2
Puente Genil (5) (4–3 p)	2	0	2
17 and 20 August
Motril (5)	2	0	2
Huétor Vega (5)	0	1	1
16 and 20 August
Torredonjimeno (5)	1	0	1
Torre del Mar (5)	2	1	3

Semi-finals
23 and 27 August
Xerez (5)	0	2	2
Puente Genil (5)	0	3	3
23 and 27 August
Motril (5)	0	0	0
Torre del Mar (5)	0	3	3

Final
30 August and 3 September
Puente Genil (5) (5–3 p)	2	0	2
Torre del Mar (5)	1	1	2

==== Final ====
30 August	Puente Genil (5)	2–1	Torre del Mar (5)	Puente Genil
20:30	Salva Vegas 26'; Juanfran 89'	Report	Iván López 90+3'	Stadium: Manuel Polinario "Poli"; Attendance: 800; Referee: Fernández Martínez

3 September	Torre del Mar (5)	1–0 (3–5 p)	Puente Genil (5)	Torre del Mar, Vélez-Málaga
20:30	Cala 21'	Report		Stadium: Juan Manuel Azuaga; Attendance: 600; Referee: Alonso Ramírez

=== Aragon tournament ===
Four teams joined the tournament in this edition: Almudévar (5), Brea (4), Ejea (5) and Utrillas (5). The matches started on 12 August and ended on 27 August.

Pos	Team	Pld	W	D	L	GF	GA	GD	Pts	Qualification	EJE	BRE	ALM	UTR
1	Ejea	3	2	1	0	4	1	+3	7	Qual. to National Phase	—	1–0	2–0	—
2	Brea	3	2	0	1	3	1	+2	6		—	—	—	2–0
3	Almudévar	3	1	0	2	3	3	0	3		—	0–1	—	3–0
4	Utrillas	3	0	1	2	1	6	−5	1		1–1	—	—	—

Source: Federación Aragonesa de Fútbol

=== Asturias tournament ===
12 teams joined the tournament. The draw was made on 7 July and the tournament started on 5 August.

Pot 1	Pot 2	Pot 3
Llanera (5); Marino Luanco (4); Langreo (4); Caudal Deportivo (5)	Praviano (5); Lealtad (5); Llanes (5); Titánico (5)	Colunga (5); Tuilla (5); Ceares (5); Luarca (5)

==== Group stage ====
===== Group A =====
Pos	Team	Pld	W	D	L	GF	GA	GD	Pts	Qualification	LAN	TUI	PRA
1	Langreo	4	4	0	0	10	2	+8	12	Qualification to semifinals	—	3–1	3–0
2	Tuilla	4	1	1	2	5	7	−2	4		1–3	—	1–1
3	Praviano	4	0	1	3	1	7	−6	1		0–1	0–2	—

Source: Fútbol Asturiano

===== Group B =====
Pos	Team	Pld	W	D	L	GF	GA	GD	Pts	Qualification	LLA	LLN	CEA
1	Llanera	4	3	0	1	8	3	+5	9	Qualification to semifinals	—	1–2	1–0
2	Llanes	4	3	0	1	9	8	+1	9		1–3	—	3–2
3	Ceares	4	0	0	4	4	10	−6	0		0–3	2–3	—

Source: Fútbol Asturiano

===== Group C =====
Pos	Team	Pld	W	D	L	GF	GA	GD	Pts	Qualification	CAU	LEA	LUA
1	Caudal	4	3	1	0	9	2	+7	10	Qualification to semifinals	—	1–1	5–0
2	Lealtad	4	2	1	1	8	3	+5	7		0–1	—	3–1
3	Luarca	4	0	0	4	2	14	−12	0		1–2	0–4	—

Source: Fútbol Asturiano

===== Group D =====
Pos	Team	Pld	W	D	L	GF	GA	GD	Pts	Qualification	MAR	TIT	COL
1	Marino Luanco	4	4	0	0	7	1	+6	12	Qualification to semifinals	—	2–1	2–0
2	Titánico	4	2	0	2	5	6	−1	6		0–2	—	2–1
3	Colunga	4	0	0	4	2	7	−5	0		0–1	1–2	—

Source: Fútbol Asturiano

==== Knockout stage ====
The knockout stage matches were played at La Mata Stadium, in Candás.

Semi-finals
26 August – Candás
Langreo (4)	2
Llanera (5) (1–3 p)	2
27 August – Candás
Caudal (5)	0
Marino Luanco (4)	1

Final
14 September – Candás
Llanera (5)	0
Marino Luanco (4)	1

==== Final ====
14 September	Llanera (5)	0–1	Marino Luanco (4)	Candás
19:00		Report	Miguel Cuesta 79'	Stadium: La Mata; Attendance: 900; Referee: Blanco Rodríguez

=== Balearic Islands tournament ===
Formentera (4) and CD Ibiza (5) joined the tournament.

13 September	Formentera (4)	1–3	CD Ibiza (5)	Sant Francesc Xavier, Formentera
18:30	Ferreres 30' (pen.)	Report	Inglada 62', 87'; Álex Sánchez 78'	Stadium: Municipal; Referee: Gabriel Torres

=== Basque Country tournament ===
4 teams joined the tournament. The draw was made 2 August.

Semi-finals
30 August
Arenas (4)	0
Real Unión (3)	1
30 August
Leioa (5)	1
Derio (5)	2

Final
13 September
Real Unión (3)	1
Derio (5)	0

==== Final ====
13 September	Real Unión (3)	1–0	Derio (5)	Irun
19:30	Peru Ruiz 82'	Report		Stadium: Gal; Attendance: 600; Referee: Julen Pangua

=== Canary Islands tournament ===
Only Gran Tarajal (5) joined the tournament.

=== Cantabria tournament ===
Eight teams from 2023 to 2024 Tercera Federación will join the tournament. The teams qualified via their results in 2022-23 leagues, ignoring those who already had their ticket for the Copa del Rey or for the national phase of the Copa RFEF.

Quarter-finals
20 August
Laredo (5)	1
Cartes (5)	0
20 August
Atlético Albericia (5)	2
Torina (5)	0
20 August
Tropezón (5)	1
Revilla (5)	0
20 August
Escobedo (5)	1
Naval (5)	0

Semi-finals
26 August - Bezana
Laredo (5) (p)	0 (5)
Atlético Albericia (5)	0 (4)
27 August - Bezana
Tropezón (5)	1
Escobedo (5)	2

Final
3 September - Bezana
Laredo (5)	2
Escobedo (5)	0

==== Final ====
3 September	Laredo (5)	2–0	Escobedo (5)	Bezana
18:30	Emma 21'; Iker Torre 52'	Report		Stadium: Municipal; Referee: García Rubio

=== Castile-La Mancha tournament ===
Twelve teams joined the Trofeo Junta de Comunidades de Castilla-La Mancham acting as qualifying tournament. Guadalajara, Illescas and Manchego cannot qualify because they were already qualified for the Copa del Rey or the National Phase of Copa RFEF.

First round
12 August
Socuéllamos (5)	0 (3)
Villacañas (5) (p)	0 (4)
5 August
Toledo (5)	0
Torrijos (5)	2
5 August
Quintanar del Rey (5)	2
Conquense (5)	1
6 August
Calvo Sotelo (5)	2
Villarrubia (5)	0

Quarter-finals
16 August
Villacañas (5) (p)	0 (4)
Illescas (4)	0 (2)
12 August
Torrijos (5)	1
Talavera de la Reina (4)	2
12 August
Quintanar del Rey (5)	0
Guadalajara (4)	1
13 August
Calvo Sotelo (5)	1
Manchego (4)	2

Semi-finals
19 August
Villacañas (5)	0
Talavera de la Reina (4)	2
20 August
Guadalajara (4) (p)	0 (9)
Manchego (4)	0 (8)

Final
26 August
Talavera de la Reina (4)	2
Guadalajara (4)	1

==== Final ====
26 August	Talavera de la Reina (4)	2–1	Guadalajara (4)	Talavera de la Reina
20:00	Szymanowski 45+1'; Javi Rey 61'	Report	Cheki 45'	Stadium: El Prado; Attendance: 800; Referee: Pérez Guimera

=== Castile and León tournament ===
7 teams joined the tournament: Atlético Bembibre (5), Ávila (5), Numancia (4), Palencia (5), Salamanca (5), Santa Marta (5) and Villaralbo (5). The draw was made 26 July and the tournament started 12 August.

==== Group stage ====
===== Group A =====
Pos	Team	Pld	W	D	L	GF	GA	GD	Pts	Qualification	NUM	AVI	PAL
1	Numancia	2	2	0	0	3	1	+2	6	Qualification to the Final	—	—	1–0
2	Ávila	2	0	1	1	1	2	−1	1		1–2	—	—
3	Palencia	2	0	1	1	0	1	−1	1		—	0–0	—

Source: RFCYLF

===== Group B =====
Pos	Team	Pld	W	D	L	GF	GA	GD	Pts	Qualification	SAL	SMA	ATB	VIL
1	Salamanca	3	2	1	0	3	1	+2	7	Qualification to the Final	—	—	1–0	—
2	Santa Marta	3	2	0	1	10	1	+9	6		0–1	—	—	—
3	Atlético Bembibre	3	1	0	2	1	7	−6	3		—	0–6	—	1–0
4	Villaralbo	3	0	1	2	1	6	−5	1		1–1	0–4	—	—

Source: RFCYLF

==== Final ====
6 September	Salamanca (5)	3–3 (a.e.t.) (0–3 p)	Numancia (4)	Villares de la Reina
19:00	Diego Benito 37' (pen.); Martín Galván 82'; Fassani 107'	Report	Moustapha 18'; Carlos González 77'; Óscar García 103'	Stadium: Estadio Helmántico; Attendance: 2.000; Referee: Cañibano Arias

=== Catalonia tournament ===
4 teams joined the tournament. Draw was made 25 July.

Semi-finals
30 August
Castelldefels (5) (a.e.t.) (p)	0 (4)
Cornellà (3)	0 (3)
30 August
Lleida Esportiu (4)	1
Sabadell (3)	0

Final
13 September
Castelldefels (5)	0
Lleida Esportiu (4)	2

==== Final ====
13 September	Castelldefels (5)	0–2	Lleida Esportiu (4)	Castelldefels
20:30		Report	Fer Cortijo 24'; Agüero 55'	Stadium: Els Canyars; Referee: Fernández Morillo

=== Ceuta tournament ===
Polillas Atlético was directly selected by Federación de Fútbol de Ceuta due to sporting merits.

=== Extremadura tournament ===
13 teams joined the tournament. Arroyo (5), Olivenza (5) and Trujillo (5) received a bye to the second round.

First round
11 August
Jaraíz (5)	2
Moralo (5)	0
12 August
Atlético Pueblonuevo (5)	0
Montijo (4)	3
12 August
Montehermoso (5)	0
Coria (5)	2
12 August
Don Álvaro (5)	3 (2)
Villafranca (5) (p)	3 (4)
12 August
Castuera (5)	0
Don Benito (5)	1

Quarter-finals
19 August
Jaraíz (5) (p)	0 (4)
Montijo (4)	0 (2)
19 August
Arroyo (5)	0
Trujillo (5)	1
20 August
Coria (5)	2
Olivenza (5)	0
19 August
Villafranca (5) (p)	2 (4)
Don Benito (5)	2 (3)

Semi-finals
26 August
Jaraíz (5)	0 (3)
Trujillo (5) (p)	0 (4)
26 August
Coria (5)	1
Villafranca (5)	2

Final
3 September - Mérida
Trujillo (5)	1
Villafranca (5)	2

==== Final ====
3 September	Trujillo (5)	1–2	Villafranca (5)	Mérida
19:00	Chori 52'	Report	Matheus 74'; Ricardo Durán 79'	Stadium: Romano José Fouto; Attendance: 1.400; Referee: Arias Silva

=== Galicia tournament ===
13 teams joined the tournament. The draw was made 12 July.

First Round
11 August
Somozas (5) (p)	0 (4)
Silva (5)	0 (2)
11 August
Paiosaco (5)	3
Bergantiños (5)	1
15 August
Rápido Bouzas (5)	0
Coruxo (4)	2
9 August
Estradense (5)	2
Arzúa (5)	0
12 August
UD Ourense (5)	1
Ourense CF (4)	2

Quarter-finals
9 August
Villalbés (4)	5
Viveiro (5)	0
18 August
Somozas (5)	1
Paiosaco (5)	0
18 August
Coruxo (4)	1
Pontevedra (4)	0
21 August
Estradense (5)	0
Ourense CF (4)	1

Semi-finals
24 August
Villalbés (4)	3
Somozas (5)	0
26 August
Coruxo (4)	0
Ourense CF (4)	1

Final
30 August - Taboada
Villalbés (4)	0 (2)
Ourense CF (4) (p)	0 (4)

==== Final ====
30 August	Villalbés (4)	0–0 (2–4 p)	Ourense CF (4)	Taboada
18:00		Report		Stadium: A Medela; Attendance: 200; Referee: Alcalá Rey

=== La Rioja tournament ===
9 teams joined the tournament. Draw was made 20 July.

First round
19 August
Berceo (5)	3
Tedeón (5)	0

Quarter-finals
30 August
UD Logroñés (4)	3
Alfaro (5)	0
24 August
SD Logroñés (3)	5
Berceo (5)	0
27 August
Calahorra (4)	2
Racing Rioja (5)	1
30 August
La Calzada (5)	4
Casalarreina (5)	1

Semi-finals
6 September
UD Logroñés (4)	1
SD Logroñés (3)	0
6 September
Calahorra (4)	1
La Calzada (5)	0

Final
13 September
UD Logroñés (4)	3
Calahorra (4)	0

==== Final ====
13 September	UD Logroñés (4)	3–0	Calahorra (4)	Logroño
20:30	Lander Yurrebaso 18'; Álex Arias 51'; Jon Madrazo 83'	Report		Stadium: Estadio Las Gaunas; Attendance: 3.150; Referee: Sánchez Murcia

=== Madrid tournament ===
8 teams joined the tournament: Alcalá (5), Fuenlabrada (3), Las Rozas (5), Móstoles URJC (5), Pozuelo de Alarcón (5), San Sebastián de los Reyes (4), Torrejón (5) and Unión Adarve (4). The draw was made 7 July.

==== Group A ====
Pos	Team	Pld	W	D	L	GF	GA	GD	Pts	Qualification	SSE	FUE	ROZ	ALC
1	San Sebastián de los Reyes	3	2	1	0	6	1	+5	7	Qualification to the final	—	—	2–0	3–0
2	Fuenlabrada	3	1	2	0	5	2	+3	5		1–1	—	1–1	—
3	Las Rozas	3	1	1	1	3	4	−1	4		—	—	—	2–1
4	Alcalá	3	0	0	3	1	8	−7	0		—	0–3	—	—

Source: Real Federación de Fútbol de Madrid

==== Group B ====
Pos	Team	Pld	W	D	L	GF	GA	GD	Pts	Qualification	ADA	POZ	MOS	TOR
1	Unión Adarve	3	2	1	0	6	4	+2	7	Qualification to the final	—	—	2–1	3–2
2	Pozuelo de Alarcón	3	1	2	0	4	3	+1	5		1–1	—	—	2–1
3	Móstoles URJC	3	0	2	1	3	4	−1	2		–	1–1	—	–
4	Torrejón	3	0	1	2	4	6	−2	1		–	–	1–1	—

Source: Real Federación de Fútbol de Madrid

==== Final ====
27 August	San Sebastián de los Reyes (4)	0–1 (a.e.t.)	Unión Adarve (4)	Madrid
11:00		Report	Juanma 113'	Stadium: Ernesto Cotorruelo; Attendance: 170; Referee: Pinilla Serrano

=== Melilla tournament ===
At. Melilla (5) was directly selected by Real Federación Melillense de Fútbol due to sporting merits.

=== Murcia tournament ===
Eight teams joined the tournament.

Quarter-finals
27 August
Ciudad de Murcia (5) (p)	1 (5)
Montecasillas (5)	1 (4)
27 August
Muleño (5)	1 (4)
El Palmar (5) (p)	1 (5)
27 August
Racing Murcia (5)	1
Alcantarilla (5)	0
26 August
Cieza (5)	2
Bullense (5)	0

Semi-finals
30 August
Ciudad de Murcia (5)	2
El Palmar (5)	0
30 August
Racing Murcia (5)	2
Cieza (5)	1

Final
3 September
Ciudad de Murcia (5)	1
Racing Murcia (5)	0

==== Final ====
3 September	Ciudad de Murcia (5)	1–0	Racing Murcia (5)	Murcia
20:00	Marcos Díaz 31'	Report		Stadium: Municipal José Barnés

=== Navarre tournament ===
Four teams joined the tournament. The draw was made 27 July.

Semi-finals
30 August
Ardoi (5)	1
Mutilvera (4)	2
30 August
Peña Sport (5)	2
Cirbonero (5)	0

Final
12 September - Pamplona
Mutilvera (4)	0
Peña Sport (5)	1

==== Final ====
12 September	Mutilvera (4)	0–1	Peña Sport (5)	Pamplona
18:30		Report	Txomin Larrainzar 81'	Stadium: Ripagaina; Referee: Azcona Aizcorbe

=== Valencian Community tournament ===
Five teams joined the tournament: Atlético Saguntino (4), Intercity (3), Patacona (5), Rayo Ibense (5) and Silla (5). The draw was made 27 July. After the draw, Intercity resigned from participating in the tournament. Matches were played between 5 and 18 August.

Pos	Team	Pld	W	D	L	GF	GA	GD	Pts	Qualification	PAT	SAG	RIB	SIL	INT
1	Patacona	3	2	0	1	5	2	+3	6	Qualification to the final	—	0–2	—	4–0	—
2	Atlético Saguntino	3	2	0	1	4	1	+3	6		—	—	2–0	—	(w.o.)
3	Rayo Ibense	3	1	0	2	4	4	0	3		0–1	—	—	—	(w.o.)
4	Silla	3	1	0	2	2	8	−6	3		—	1–0	1–4	—	—
5	Intercity	0	0	0	0	0	0	0	0		(w.o.)	—	—	(w.o.)	—

Source: Federació de Futbol de la Comunitat Valenciana

== National phase ==
National phase was played between 27 September and 22 November with 32 teams (20 winners of the Regional Tournaments, the best 5 teams from 2022–23 Segunda División RFEF not yet qualified to 2023–24 Copa del Rey and the best 7 teams from 2022–23 Tercera División RFEF not yet qualified to 2023–24 Copa del Rey). The four semifinalists qualified to 2023–24 Copa del Rey first round.

=== Qualified teams ===
- 5 best teams from 2022–23 Segunda Federación not yet qualified to 2023–24 Copa del Rey

- (Catalonia) Badalona Futur (4)
- (Cantabria) Gimnástica Torrelavega (4)
- (Castilla–La Mancha) Guadalajara (4)
- (Navarre) San Juan (4)
- (Andalusia) San Roque Lepe (4)

- 7 best teams from 2022–23 Tercera Federación not yet qualified to 2023–24 Copa del Rey

- (Andalusia) El Palo (4)
- (Castilla–La Mancha) Illescas (4)
- (Asturias) L'Entregu (5)
- (Canary Islands) Lanzarote (5)
- (Balearic Islands) Penya Independent (4)
- (Catalonia) Sant Andreu (4)
- (Cantabria) Vimenor (5)

- Winners of Autonomous Communities tournaments

- (Region of Murcia) Ciudad de Murcia (5)
- (Aragon) Ejea (5)
- (Canary Islands) Gran Tarajal (5)
- (Balearic Islands) CD Ibiza (5)
- (Cantabria) Laredo (5)
- (Catalonia) Lleida Esportiu (4)
- (Asturias) Marino Luanco (4)
- At. Melilla (5)
- (Castile and León) Numancia (4)
- (Galicia (Spain)) Ourense CF (4)
- (Valencian Community) Patacona (5)
- (Navarre) Peña Sport (5)
- (Ceuta) Polillas Atlético (6)
- (Andalusia) Puente Genil (5)
- (Basque Country (autonomous community)) Real Unión (3)
- (Castilla–La Mancha) Talavera de la Reina (4)
- (Andalusia) Torre del Mar (5)
- (La Rioja) UD Logroñés (4)
- (Community of Madrid) Unión Adarve (4)
- (Extremadura) Villafranca (5)

=== Draw ===
The draw for the entire tournament was made at the RFEF headquarters on 14 September. The teams were divided into four pots based on geographical criteria. Each pot was played independently until the semi-finals.

Pot A	Pot B	Pot C	Pot D
(Asturias) L'Entregu (5) (Asturias) Marino Luanco (4)^{†} (Basque Country (autonomous community)) Real Unión (3) (Cantabria) Gimnástica Torrelavega (4) (Cantabria) Laredo (5) (Cantabria) Vimenor (5) (Galicia (Spain)) Ourense CF (4) (La Rioja) UD Logroñés (4)	(Aragon) Ejea (5) (Balearic Islands) CD Ibiza (5) (Balearic Islands) Penya Independent (4) (Catalonia) Badalona Futur (4) (Catalonia) Lleida Esportiu (4) (Catalonia) Sant Andreu (4) (Navarre) Peña Sport (5) (Navarre) San Juan (4)	(Canary Islands) Gran Tarajal (5) (Canary Islands) Lanzarote (5) (Castilla–La Mancha) Guadalajara (4) (Castilla–La Mancha) Illescas (4) (Castilla–La Mancha) Talavera de la Reina (4) (Castile and León) Numancia (4) (Community of Madrid) Unión Adarve (4) (Valencian Community) Patacona (5)	(Andalusia) El Palo (4) (Andalusia) Puente Genil (5) (Andalusia) San Roque Lepe (4) (Andalusia) Torre del Mar (5) (Ceuta) Polillas Atlético (6) (Extremadura) Villafranca (5); At. Melilla (5)^{†} (Region of Murcia) Ciudad de Murcia (5)

† The identity of this team was unknown at the time of the draw

=== Bracket ===
Round of 32
27 September
San Roque Lepe (4) (a.e.t.)	1
Ciudad de Murcia (5)	0
27 September
Villafranca (5)	2
Puente Genil (5)	0
27 September
At. Melilla (5) (a.e.t.)	1
Polillas Atlético (6)	0
27 September
Torre del Mar (5)	3
El Palo (4)	0
27 September
Guadalajara (4)	2
Lanzarote (5)	0
27 September
Gran Tarajal (5)	0
Illescas (4)	1
27 September
Talavera de la R. (4)	2
Numancia (4)	0
27 September
Unión Adarve (4)	2
Patacona (5)	0
27 September
Vimenor (5)	2 (2)
L'Entregu (5) (a.e.t.) (p)	2 (4)
27 September
Marino Luanco (4)	2
Real Unión (3)	1
27 September
UD Logroñés (4)	2
Laredo (5)	0
27 September
Gim. Torrelavega (4)	2
Ourense CF (4)	1
27 September
CD Ibiza (5)	0
Badalona Futur (4)	2
27 September
San Juan (4)	3
P. Independent (4)	1
27 September
Ejea (5) (a.e.t.) (p)	0 (5)
Peña Sport (5)	0 (4)
27 September
Sant Andreu (4)	1
Lleida Esportiu (4)	0

Round of 16
4 October
San Roque Lepe (4) (a.e.t.)	1
Villafranca (5)	0
4 October
At. Melilla (5)	0
Torre del Mar (5)	3
4 October
Guadalajara (4)	4
Illescas (4)	1
4 October
Talavera de la R. (4)	2
Unión Adarve (4)	0
5 October
L'Entregu (5) (a.e.t.) (p)	0 (4)
Marino Luanco (4)	0 (2)
4 October
UD Logroñés (4)	4
Gim. Torrelavega (4)	1
4 October
Badalona Futur (4)	3
San Juan (4)	0
4 October
Ejea (5) (a.e.t.) (p)	1 (6)
Sant Andreu (4)	1 (5)

Quarter-finals
11 October
San Roque Lepe (4)	4
Torre del Mar (5)	1
11 October
Guadalajara (4)	1
Talavera de la R. (4)	2
11 October
L'Entregu (5)	0
UD Logroñés (4) (a.e.t.)	1
11 October
Badalona Futur (4)	3
Ejea (5)	0

Semi-finals
8 November
San Roque Lepe (4)	1 (3)
Talavera de la R. (4) (a.e.t.) (p)	1 (4)
25 October
UD Logroñés (4)	2
Badalona Futur (4) (a.e.t.)	3

Final
22 November
Talavera de la R. (4)	1
Badalona Futur (4)	2

=== Round of 32 ===
Pot A

27 September	Vimenor (5)	2–2 (a.e.t.) (2–4 p)	L'Entregu (5)	Piélagos
20:00	Rubén Palazuelos 49'; David Angulo 82'	Report	Carlos Argüelles 'Mundaka' 8'; Cristian Ferrero 52' (pen.)	Stadium: La Vidriera; Attendance: 500; Referee: García Arriola (Basque Country)

27 September	Marino Luanco (4)	2–1	Real Unión (3)	Luanco
20:00	Guaya 27'; César García 79'	Report	Julen Azkue 83'	Stadium: Miramar; Attendance: 400; Referee: Pastoriza Iglesias (Galicia)

27 September	UD Logroñés (4)	2–0	Laredo (5)	Logroño
20:30	Urtzi Urcelay 34'; Aitor Seguín 76'			Stadium: Las Gaunas; Attendance: 2.000; Referee: Casabona Isla (Navarre)

27 September	Gimnástica Torrelavega (4)	2–1	Ourense CF (4)	Torrelavega
20:15	Pol Bassa 10'; Álex Basurto 77'	Report	Brais Penela 17'	Stadium: El Malecón; Referee: Alonso Luiña (Asturias)

Pot B

27 September	CD Ibiza (5)	0–2	Badalona Futur (4)	Ibiza
19:00		Report	Zourdine Thior 58'; Aleix Roig 65'	Stadium: Sánchez y Vivancos (Can Misses 3); Referee: Lidón Rocamora (Valencian Community)

27 September	San Juan (4)	3–1	Penya Independent (4)	Pamplona
20:00	Ander Altxu 17'; Álex Gómez 48'; Eder Iribarren 73'	Report	Jaime Isuardi 44'	Stadium: San Juan; Referee: Crespo Puente (Cantabria)

27 September	Ejea (5)	0–0 (a.e.t.) (5–4 p)	Peña Sport (5)	Ejea de los Caballeros
19:30		Report		Stadium: Luchán; Attendance: 150; Referee: Oltra Sáez (Catalonia)

27 September	Sant Andreu (4)	1–0	Lleida Esportiu (4)	Barcelona
20:00	Ernest Forgas 59'	Report		Stadium: Narcís Sala; Referee: Escobar López (Canary Islands)

Pot C

27 September	Guadalajara (4)	2–0	Lanzarote (5)	Guadalajara
20:00	Sergio Recio 'Cheki' 87'; Diego Morcillo 90' (pen.)	Report		Stadium: Pedro Escartín; Attendance: 600; Referee: Lázaro Martínez (La Rioja)

27 September	Gran Tarajal (5)	0–1	Illescas (4)	Gran Tarajal
18:00		Report	David Ranera 31'	Stadium: Municipal; Attendance: 100; Referee: Morona del Campo (Madrid)

27 September	Talavera de la Reina (4)	2–0	Numancia (4)	Talavera de la Reina
20:30	Jacques Dago 6'; Nacho Abeledo 87'	Report		Stadium: El Prado; Referee: Muñoz García (Extremadura)

27 September	Unión Adarve (4)	2–0	Patacona (5)	Madrid
20:00	Fernando Harta 49'; Diego Rodríguez 57'	Report		Stadium: Ernesto Cotorruelo; Referee: Saiz Villares (Balearic Islands)

Pot D

27 September	San Roque Lepe (4)	1–0 (a.e.t.)	Ciudad de Murcia (5)	Lepe
21:00	Sergio García 106'	Report		Stadium: Ciudad de Lepe; Attendance: 600; Referee: Broncano Suárez (Extremadura)

27 September	Villafranca (5)	2–0	Puente Genil (5)	Villafranca de los Barros
20:30	Baaqi Ganiyu 52'; Antonio Pavón 90'	Report		Stadium: Municipal; Attendance: 1.300; Referee: Muñoz Moreno (Madrid)

27 September	At. Melilla (5)	1–0 (a.e.t.)	Polillas Atlético (6)	Melilla
20:00	Cissé 93'	Report		Stadium: La Espiguera

27 September	Torre del Mar (5)	3–0	El Palo (4)	Torre del Mar
18:00	Antonio López 11'; Javi Fernández 64'; Iván López 90'			Stadium: Juan Manuel Azuaga; Referee: Palomares Gutiérrez (Andalusia)

=== Round of 16 ===
Pot A

5 October	L'Entregu (5)	0–0 (a.e.t.) (4–2 p)	Marino Luanco (4)	El Entrego
19:00		Report		Stadium: Nuevo Nalón; Attendance: 600; Referee: Cueto Amigo (Castile and León)

4 October	UD Logroñés (4)	4–1	Gimnástica Torrelavega (4)	Logroño
20:30	Cristian Fernández 'Titi' 42'; Enzo Facchin 57'; Javi Cobo 61'; Unai García 90+6'	Report	Ernesten Lavsamba 78'	Stadium: Las Gaunas; Attendance: 1.500; Referee: Urízar Díaz (Basque Country)

Pot B

4 October	Badalona Futur (4)	3–0	San Juan (4)	Vic
15:30	Víctor Valverde 1'; Peque Polo 73', 88'	Report		Stadium: Estadi ZEM Hipòlit Planàs; Attendance: 100; Referee: Sánchez Alba (Aragon)

4 October	Ejea (5)	1–1 (a.e.t.) (6–5 p)	Sant Andreu (4)	Ejea de los Caballeros
20:00	Jorge Álvarez 12'	Report	Alberto García 'Albertito' 18'	Stadium: Luchán; Attendance: 450; Referee: Munárriz Mateos (Navarre)

Pot C

4 October	Guadalajara (4)	4–1	Illescas (4)	Guadalajara
20:30	Adrián Chaves (o.g.) 12'; Iván Riveiro 42'; Juanca Pineda 45'; Fran Santano 86'	Report	José David Molina 29'	Stadium: Pedro Escartín; Attendance: 600; Referee: García Rubio (Castile-La Mancha)

4 October	Talavera de la Reina (4)	2–0	Unión Adarve (4)	Talavera de la Reina
20:30	Rafael Ramos 'Pipo' 21'; Ignacio Abeledo 90+5'	Report		Stadium: El Prado; Attendance: 1.800; Referee: Pérez Fernández (Castile and León)

Pot D

4 October	San Roque Lepe (4)	1–0 (a.e.t.)	Villafranca (5)	Lepe
20:30	Víctor Barroso 112'	Report		Stadium: Ciudad de Lepe; Attendance: 800; Referee: De la Mata Martínez (Madrid)

4 October	At. Melilla (5)	0–3	Torre del Mar (5)	Melilla
20:00		Report	Javi Fernández 13'; Antonio López 40'; Iván López 85'	Stadium: La Espiguera

=== Quarter-finals ===
Winners will qualify to the 2023–24 Copa del Rey first round.

Pot A

11 October	L'Entregu (5)	0–1 (a.e.t.)	UD Logroñés (4)	El Entrego
19:30		Report	Aitor Seguín 105'	Stadium: Nuevo Nalón; Attendance: 600; Referee: López Fernández (Galicia)

Pot B

11 October	Badalona Futur (4)	3–0	Ejea (5)	Vic
20:00	Alfredo Pedraza 3'; Jaume Pascual 81'; Zourdine Thior 90+2'	Report		Stadium: Estadi ZEM Hipòlit Planàs; Referee: González Rodríguez (Canary Islands)

Pot C

11 October	Guadalajara (4)	1–2	Talavera de la Reina (4)	Guadalajara
20:30	Iván del Olmo 77'	Report	Jacques Dago 17'; Caio Emerson 51'	Stadium: Pedro Escartín; Attendance: 1.600; Referee: Ramírez Marco (Aragon)

Pot D

11 October	San Roque Lepe (4)	4–1	Torre del Mar (5)	Lepe
20:30	Mohamed Mizzian 58'; Jesús Rueda 64'; Víctor Barroso 76'; Kevin Bautista 78'	Report	Arturo Daniel Sáinz 46'	Stadium: Ciudad de Lepe; Attendance: 1.000; Referee: Domínguez Maestre (Andalusia)

=== Semi-finals ===
8 November	San Roque Lepe (4)	1–1 (a.e.t.) (3–4 p)	Talavera de la Reina (4)	Lepe
20:30				Stadium: Ciudad de Lepe
Note: The San Roque de Lepe v Talavera de la Reina match, originally scheduled to be played on 25 October 2023, 20:30, was postponed due to the damage caused by the inclement weather.

25 October	UD Logroñés (4)	2–3 (a.e.t.)	Badalona Futur (4)	Logroño
20:30	Adrià Capdevila 44'; Ander Vitoria 45'	Report	Víctor Valverde 78'; Jaume Pascual 83'; Sergio Cortés 93'	Stadium: Las Gaunas; Attendance: 2.007; Referee: Gorka Mazo Maruri (Basque Country)

=== Final ===
22 November	Talavera de la Reina (4)	1–2	Badalona Futur (4)	Talavera de la Reina
20:00	Jacques Dago 47'	Report	Jaume Pascual 7'; Peque Polo 44'	Stadium: El Prado; Attendance: 2,362; Referee: Ekaitz Ikiñi García (Basque Country)
