= Víctor Valverde =

Spanish footballer (born 2004)

Personal information
- Full name: Víctor Valverde da Silva
- Date of birth: 26 December 2001 (age 24)
- Place of birth: Figueres, Spain
- Height: 1.77 m (5 ft 10 in)
- Position: Winger

Team information
- Current team: Albacete
- Number: 11

Youth career
- Figueres
- 2019–2020: Girona

Senior career*
Years	Team	Apps	(Gls)
2018–2019	Figueres	23	(0)
2020–2021	Girona B	0	(0)
2020–2021	→ Figueres (loan)	28	(2)
2021–2023	Pobla Mafumet	45	(8)
2022–2023	Gimnàstic	1	(0)
2023	→ Olot (loan)	14	(1)
2023–2024	Badalona Futur	32	(6)
2024–2025	Sanluqueño	19	(6)
2025	Villarreal B	17	(4)
2025–	Albacete	22	(0)
- * Club domestic league appearances and goals as of 9 June 2026

Víctor Valverde da Silva (born 26 December 2001) is a Spanish footballer who plays as a winger for Albacete Balompié.

== Personal life ==
Valverde was born in Figueres, Girona, Catalonia to Juanito Valverde, a former footballer of UE Figueres, and a Brazilian mother.

== Career ==
After beginning his career with Figueres, Valverde made his first team debut at the age of 16 on 6 May 2018, in a 1–0 Tercera División home loss to EC Granollers. On 27 June 2019, after establishing himself as a first team member, he left the club and joined Girona FC, initially assigned to the Juvenil squad.

On 27 August 2020, Valverde returned to Figueres on loan. On 27 July of the following year, he moved to Gimnàstic de Tarragona and was assigned to farm team CF Pobla de Mafumet in Tercera División RFEF.

A regular starter for Pobla, Valverde featured in one Primera Federación match with Nàstic before being loaned out to Segunda Federación side UE Olot on 19 January 2023. On 4 August, he moved to fellow fourth tier side CF Badalona Futur.

Valverde won the 2023 Copa Federación de España with Badalona before moving to third division side Atlético Sanluqueño CF on 3 July 2024. The following 23 January, he was transferred to Villarreal CF for a rumoured fee of € 100,000, being assigned to the reserves also in the third tier.

On 23 June 2025, Valverde signed a three-year contract with Segunda División side Albacete Balompié. He made his professional debut on 18 August, coming on as a late substitute for Agus Medina in a 4–4 away draw against UD Almería.

== Honours ==
Badalona Futur

- Copa Federación de España: 2023
