= Cotillas CD =

Association football club in Spain

Cotillas
- Full name: Cotillas Club Deportivo - Estrella Grana
- Founded: 2021
- Ground: Onofre Fernández Verdú, Las Torres de Cotillas, Region of Murcia, Spain
- President: Manuel Hernández
- Manager: Guillermo Sánchez Cremades
- League: Tercera Federación – Group 13
- 2025–26: Preferente Autonómica, 10th of 18
Home colours	Away colours

Cotillas Club Deportivo - Estrella Grana is a Spanish football team based in Las Torres de Cotillas, in the Region of Murcia. Founded in 2021, it plays in Tercera Federación – Group 13, and holding home matches at Campo de Fútbol Municipal Onofre Fernández Verdú.

== History ==
Founded in 2021, Cotillas achieved promotion to the Preferente Autonómica, the highest level of regional football in the region, in 2025. In July 2026, the club bought the place of El Palmar CF in Tercera Federación, achieving a promotion to that division and bringing national football back to the city of Las Torres de Cotillas since 1998 after the relegation of AD Cotillas CF.

Cotillas also reached the final of the Murcia tournament of the 2026 Copa Federación de España, but lost it to Real Murcia CF.

== Season to season ==
Season	Tier	Division	Place	Copa del Rey
2021–22	8	2ª Aut.	10th	
2022–23	8	2ª Aut.	5th	
2023–24	7	1ª Aut.	3rd	
2024–25	7	1ª Aut.	5th	
2025–26	6	Pref. Aut.	10th	
2026–27	5	3ª Fed.		

- 1 season in Tercera Federación
