= Iker Muniain =

Spanish footballer (born 1992)

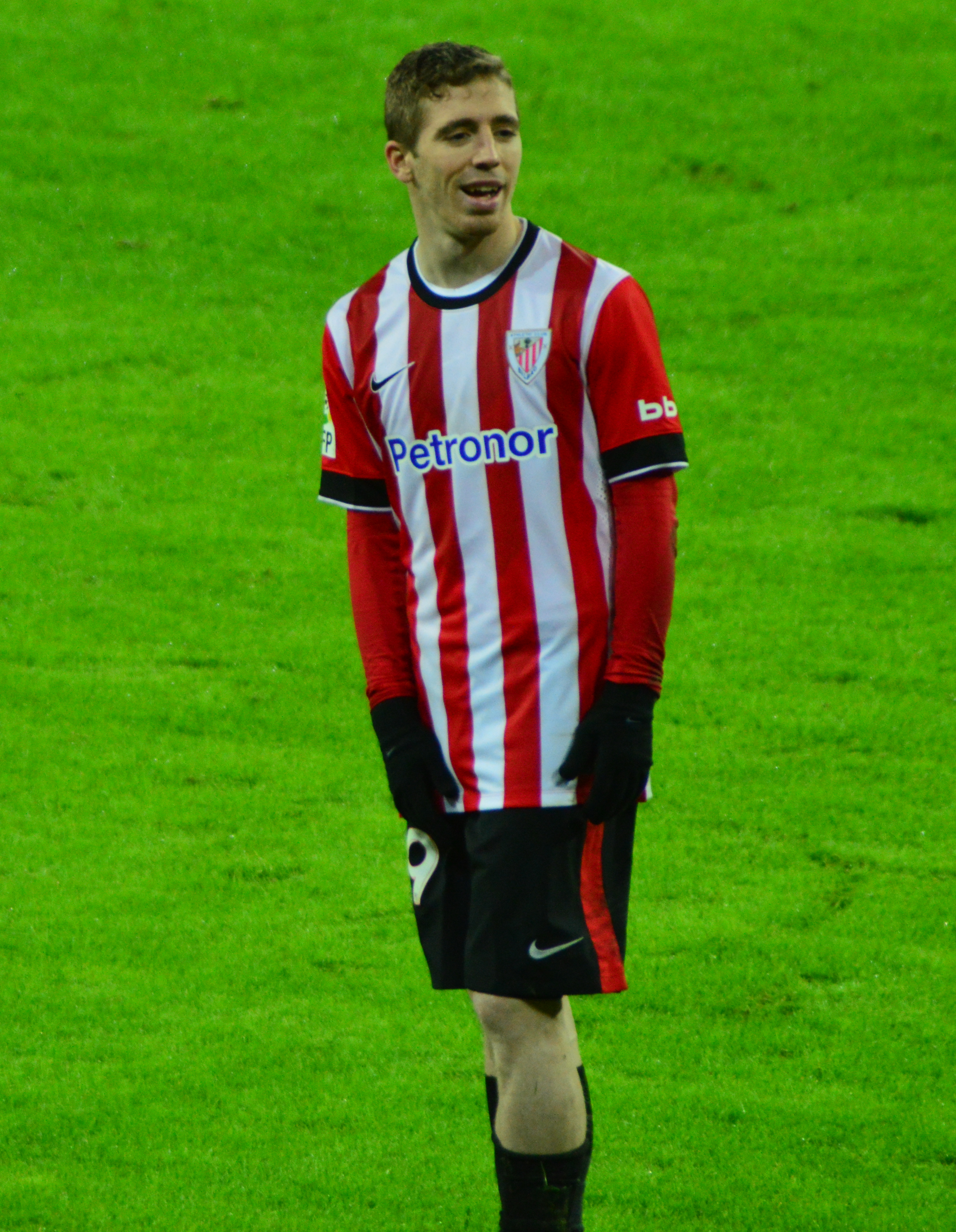
- Muniain with Athletic Bilbao in 2014

Personal information
- Full name: Iker Muniain Goñi
- Date of birth: 19 December 1992 (age 33)
- Place of birth: Pamplona, Spain
- Height: 1.69 m (5 ft 7 in)
- Positions: Winger; forward

Team information
- Current team: Salamanca UDS (manager)

Youth career
- 2000–2005: Txantrea
- 2005–2009: Athletic Bilbao

Senior career*
Years	Team	Apps	(Gls)
2009–2010	Bilbao Athletic	19	(3)
2009–2024	Athletic Bilbao	434	(56)
2024–2025	San Lorenzo	25	(4)
Total		478	(63)

International career
2008	Spain U16	2	(1)
2008–2009	Spain U17	20	(2)
2010	Spain U19	5	(0)
2011	Spain U20	1	(0)
2011–2014	Spain U21	31	(7)
2012	Spain U23	3	(0)
2012–2019	Spain	2	(0)
2010–2020	Basque Country	4	(2)

Managerial career
- 2025–2026: Derio
- 2026–: Salamanca UDS
Medal record
Men's football
Representing Spain
FIFA U-17 World Cup
Third place	2009 Nigeria	Team
- * Club domestic league appearances and goals

Iker Muniain Goñi (Basque: [iker muniain ɡoɲi], Spanish: [ˈikeɾ muˈnjajŋ ˈɡoɲi]; (Note: In isolation, Muniain is pronounced [muˈnjajn].) born 19 December 1992) is a Spanish former professional footballer who played mainly as a winger but also as a forward. He is currently manager of Segunda Federación club Salamanca UDS.

He began his career with Athletic Bilbao, debuting aged 16 in 2009 as their youngest player in a competitive match. He helped the team reach the final of the UEFA Europa League in 2012 and played in Copa del Rey finals in 2012, 2020 and 2021, but finished on the losing side each time. He took part in 560 games for the club while scoring 76 goals, and lifted the Spanish Cup as captain in 2024 a few months before leaving to end a 19-year association. Following his departure, he joined San Lorenzo of Argentina.

Muniain made 59 appearances for Spain at youth level, winning the European Under-21 Championship in 2011 and 2013. He also featured at the 2012 Olympics, in the same year as his senior Spain debut. He was selected again in 2019, gaining a second international cap seven years after the first.

== Club career ==
=== Athletic Bilbao ===
==== Precocious debut ====
Born in Pamplona, Navarre, Muniain was a product of Basque giants Athletic Bilbao's youth ranks after joining at the age of 12. In January 2009, he made his debut for the reserve team Bilbao Athletic in the Segunda División B, aged 16 years and 16 days, and scored his first goal at that level 19 days later.

Muniain made his first-team debut on 30 July 2009, in a UEFA Europa League qualifying match against BSC Young Boys: he entered the field as a 59th-minute substitute for Gaizka Toquero in an eventual 1–0 home defeat, thus becoming the youngest player in 94 years to wear Athletic's shirt in an official game at 16 years, 7 months and 11 days old, only behind Domingo Acedo who scored on his debut in 1914. One week later, in the return leg in Switzerland, he netted his first goal, in a 2–1 win that qualified for the playoff rounds; he again entered the club's record books as the joint-second-youngest player to find the net (16 years, 7 months and 18 days) in a competitive match – behind Acedo and level with Agustín Gaínza– and the youngest ever in a European match.

Another record fell on 30 August 2009, as Muniain started in the 1–0 home victory over RCD Espanyol, 2009–10's opener, becoming the youngest player to have donned the club's shirt in La Liga (overtaking Patxi Ferreira). Two weeks later he scored again in European competition, 3–0 at home against FK Austria Wien, after a good team move involving Andoni Iraola and veteran Joseba Etxeberria.

On 4 October 2009, Muniain became the youngest player to score in a first division match as he achieved that feat in a 2–2 draw at Real Valladolid, aged 16 years and 289 days– that record was surpassed by Málaga CF's Fabrice Olinga in August 2012. On 1 December he signed his first professional contract, running until June 2015. On the 6th, after nearly one month out due to injury, he returned to action, scoring as a 51st-minute substitute to give his team the lead, albeit in a 2–1 loss to Valencia CF. He set up both goals in the next game, a 2–1 win at Real Zaragoza, and finished his first senior season with 35 appearances and six goals across all competitions.

==== 2010s ====
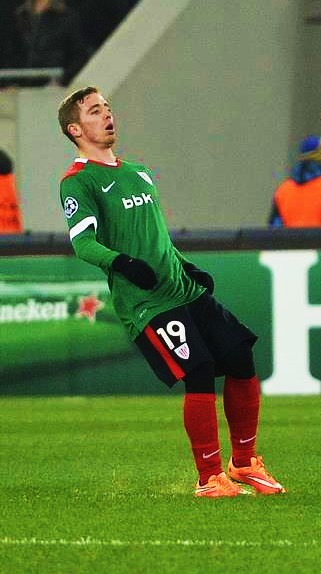
Muniain in a Champions League game against Shakhtar Donetsk in 2014

Muniain was an undisputed starter in the 2010–11 campaign, featuring as a left winger for the Joaquín Caparrós-led side. On 17 April 2011, he scored a last-minute goal in a 2–1 away defeat of CA Osasuna in his hometown; he was initially booked for taking his hand to his ear during his celebrations (before signing for Athletic he played for UDC Txantrea in Pamplona, and always considered Osasuna a rival organisation. He did clarify that, just because he had affection for a particular organisation, it did not mean he held any animosity towards any others) which meant a suspension for his fifth yellow card of the season, but it was later lifted. Now allowed to take part in the following matchday, the derby against Real Sociedad, he netted another in a 2–1 home victory.

Muniain took part in 58 games overall in 2011–12, scoring on nine occasions as the Lions reached both the Europa League and the Copa del Rey finals. In early 2012, he was linked with a move away from Athletic, although a move never materialised as he did not push for a move with three years still left on his contract. He scored just once in 33 league appearances the following campaign, netting the only goal on 10 March 2013 in a home win over Valencia which eased doubts over a possible relegation battle.

On 1 December 2013, Muniain was again the sole name on the scoresheet at the new San Mamés Stadium, to hand FC Barcelona their first league loss of that season. Eighteen days later, he celebrated his 21st birthday by grabbing a brace in a 4–0 domestic cup home victory against RC Celta de Vigo, which signified his team progressed through to the round of 16 4–1 on aggregate. In that period, media reports suggested that his progression as a footballer in his 20s had slowed after showing such high potential as a young teenager.

==== Knee injuries ====
On 4 April 2015, during a game against Sevilla FC, Muniain suffered the first serious injury of his career, being sidelined for several months with an anterior cruciate ligament ailment to his left knee– this meant he was unable to take any part in the year's Spanish Cup or Supercopa de España finals. After suffering some setbacks in his recovery process he returned to action on 20 December, replacing Iñaki Williams for the last minutes of a 2–0 home defeat of Levante UD.

Muniain successfully regained his first-team place in December 2015 and made 86 further appearances between then and 28 September 2017, when he suffered another serious ACL injury (this time to his right knee) in the closing stages of a Europa League fixture at home to FC Zorya Luhansk, potentially ending his season. After an absence of just over six months, he returned to action as a substitute in a domestic league match against Villarreal CF on 9 April 2018, scoring his side's third in a 3–1 away win.

Muniain signed a new deal with Athletic Bilbao in November 2018 to run until summer 2024, as his link was set to expire; unusually, it did not include any buyout clause. He said: "I didn't want a release clause because I do not want to have a price or be for sale. I want to go hand in hand with Athletic to the end... I want to be here for the rest of my career helping the club achieve nice things." Following the departures of Ander Iturraspe and Markel Susaeta in summer 2019 he was appointed as the club captain, and also reached the milestone of ten years with the first team.

==== 2020s ====
On 19 January 2020, Muniain became the 18th player in Athletic's history to play 400 official games, against Celta. In July of that year, his 420th match set the club record for a player from Navarre, surpassing Ismael Urzaiz. On 8 November, he made his 430th appearance to enter its top 10 (equalling Julen Guerrero's total) at the age of 27.

In early 2021, with the team playing a more attacking style under new coach Marcelino García Toral, Muniain recorded eight assists in three competitions between 17 January and 15 February (bettering his total for some entire seasons previously), including two in the Spanish Supercup final as his team won the trophy. During April of that year he took the field in the 2020 (delayed due to the COVID-19 pandemic) and 2021 Spanish Cup finals, both played in an empty Estadio de la Cartuja – the same venue as the Supercup win – due to the pandemic restrictions. Athletic lost the first match 1–0 to Real Sociedad, with Muniain breaking a footballing superstition before kick-off by touching the trophy (considered to be 'bad luck') but praised for his sportsmanship for staying on the pitch after the final whistle to applaud the winners. A pre-match injury doubt for the second final two weeks later, he stated to the press "Cups and trophies are not won or lost because one touches it or not. They are won on the pitch, and that is the only reality", but this time it was noted he kept his hands well away from the prize; nevertheless, his team were defeated 4–0 by Barcelona, he was withdrawn at half-time with the score at 0–0 and did not feature again that season, missing the last eight league fixtures.

On 31 October 2021, Muniain scored a late equaliser in the Basque derby via a free kick and was again conspicuous for his sportsmanship in consoling the opposing goalkeeper Álex Remiro, a former Athletic player whose error had contributed to the goal. In February 2022, it was assessed that he had created 60 scoring chances in that league campaign and 72 in all competitions, the most by any player by both counts. Despite knocking both Barcelona and Real Madrid out of the domestic cup, they lost in the semi-finals to Valencia, and finished the league campaign in eighth, just out of the European qualification places.

Muniain made his 500th appearance for Athletic on the first matchday of 2022–23 against RCD Mallorca, reaching the milestone at a younger age than the five other players to do so. He was honoured in a reception after that match, and was presented with a memento by two of those men – José Ángel Iribar and Susaeta – on the pitch before the next fixture against Valencia six days later. After a promising start under returning coach Ernesto Valverde the team again finished eighth and lost narrowly in the cup semi-finals (this time to Osasuna); he featured regularly but became less of a habitual starter, coming off the bench in 11 of his 30 league appearances.

Athletic also began 2023–24 strongly, but Muniain was selected rarely during the first half of the season, with Valverde opting for Oihan Sancet as the starting attacking midfielder and either Álex Berenguer or rookie Unai Gómez as an offensive substitute. On 30 September against Real Sociedad, he reached 542 appearances for the club, surpassing Txetxu Rojo's record for an outfield player (albeit with far fewer minutes overall) and trailing Iribar alone. In the Spanish Cup final against Mallorca, he was brought on as a substitute at the start of extra time with the score at 1–1. He narrowly missed the target with a free kick, and then scored his penalty in the subsequent shootout; Berenguer converted the winning kick, and the team claimed the trophy for the first time in 40 years.

Although there was some expectation that he may remain for the upcoming European campaign, on 24 April 2024 Muniain announced he would leave Athletic on 30 June, marking the end of his 15-year tenure in which he became the second-highest appearance maker in the club's history (560 matches); he declared himself happy with the timing of his departure having won the cup, and it was speculated that he would move abroad to continue his playing career. His appearance record stood for just over a year before being overtaken in February 2025 by long-time teammate Óscar de Marcos, who had also replaced him as captain.

=== San Lorenzo ===
Muniain made several trips to Argentina, declaring that he wanted to play in that country, and held talks with Leandro Romagnoli, the coach of San Lorenzo de Almagro; on 3 September 2024 he signed a contract running to December 2025, with the latter declaring that the former's role would be as a playmaker located behind the striker. He became the tenth Spaniard to play for the club, one of the most prominent being Ángel Zubieta who also represented Athletic Bilbao.

On 28 September 2024, Muniain scored his first Primera División goals, a brace in the 2–1 home win over Club Atlético Banfield. In June 2025, he announced he was leaving the Estadio Pedro Bidegain in order to return to Spain.

== International career ==
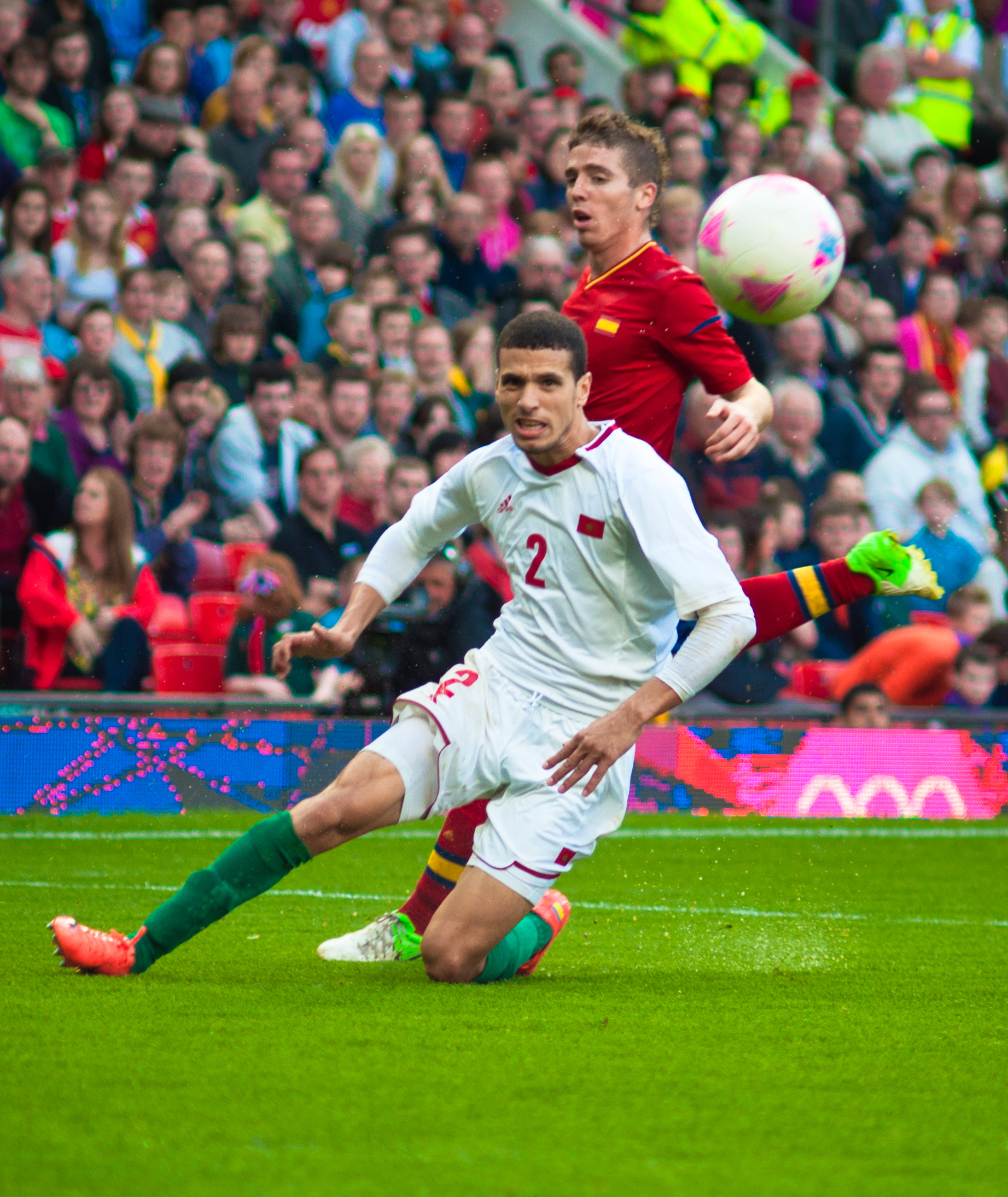
Muniain (back) chasing Abdelatif Noussir at the 2012 Olympics

On 8 February 2011, at the age of only 18, Muniain made his debut with the Spain under-21 team in a match against Denmark, replacing Adrián López. Subsequently, he was selected by manager Luis Milla to the squad that appeared in the 2011 UEFA European Championship, appearing in all the games as the nation won its third title in the category and qualified for the 2012 Summer Olympics.

On 24 February 2012, Muniain was called up to the senior side for the first time, for a friendly with Venezuela. Five days later, he came on for Cesc Fàbregas in the 74th minute of the 5–0 win in Málaga. Later that year, at the Summer Olympic Games in London, he made two appearances as Spain exited in the group stage without scoring a goal.

Muniain earned 31 caps for the under-21s, which was a national record for three years before being surpassed by Gerard Deulofeu. In 2019, after showing fine form for his club, he was selected in the senior squad for two UEFA Euro 2020 qualifying matches; he played his second match more than seven years after the first, as well as his competitive debut, as a substitute in a 2–0 victory over Malta on 26 March.

Muniain also featured for the unofficial Basque Country regional team.

== Coaching career ==
On 28 June 2025, Muniain announced his retirement at age 32. He was immediately appointed as manager of Tercera Federación side CD Derio.

Muniain became head coach of Segunda Federación's Salamanca CF UDS on 15 June 2026.

== Style of play ==
Due to his style of play and stature, Muniain was dubbed "the Spanish Messi" by the media as a teenager.

== Personal life ==
Muniain has two older cousins who are also footballers, were both Athletic youth players and were briefly his teammates at Bilbao Athletic. Adrien Goñi, a midfielder, made a handful of first-team appearances before embarking on a career in the Spanish third division. Winger Julen Goñi eventually moved to Barakaldo CF also in that tier.

Muniain's son was born in February 2015, with the player announcing his girlfriend's pregnancy in August 2014 by gesturing while celebrating his goal against SSC Napoli in the play-off of the UEFA Champions League. He is an admirer of Sergio Agüero, and named his pet Labrador Kun after the Argentina international; Muniain's own nickname, Bart Simpson, was given to him by Fernando Amorebieta due to his mischievous personality as well as his diminutive stature and fair hair.

Having vowed to have the Europa League trophy tattooed on his body if Athletic Bilbao won the 2012 final, which did not happen, Muniain did have the Supercopa de España trophy 'inked' on his leg in 2015 following the team's victory (albeit he took no part in the matches due to injury). Another tattoo on the rear of his neck, XIX, (19 in Roman numerals) refers to his birth date and that of his brother, and was his original Athletic squad number for several seasons although he wore 27 as a promoted youth player in his breakthrough campaign, and in 2016 changed to the traditional playmaker's number 10 which he held until leaving the club eight years later.

== Career statistics ==
=== Club ===
Appearances and goals by club, season and competition
Club	Season	League			National cup (Note: Includes Copa del Rey, Copa Argentina)		Continental		Other		Total	
Club	Season	Division	Apps	Goals	Apps	Goals	Apps	Goals	Apps	Goals	Apps	Goals
Bilbao Athletic	2008–09	Segunda División B	13	1	–		–		–		13	1
Bilbao Athletic	2009–10	Segunda División B	6	2	–		–		–		6	2
Bilbao Athletic	Total		19	3	–		–		–		19	3
Athletic Bilbao	2009–10	La Liga	26	4	0	0	9 (Note: Appearances in UEFA Europa League)	2	0	0	35	6
Athletic Bilbao	2010–11	La Liga	35	5	3	0	–		–		38	5
Athletic Bilbao	2011–12	La Liga	33	2	9	2	16	5	–		58	9
Athletic Bilbao	2012–13	La Liga	33	1	2	0	8	1	–		43	2
Athletic Bilbao	2013–14	La Liga	35	7	4	2	–		–		39	9
Athletic Bilbao	2014–15	La Liga	25	1	7	0	9 (Note: Seven appearances and one goal in UEFA Champions League, two appearances in UEFA Europa League)	1	–		41	2
Athletic Bilbao	2015–16	La Liga	20	2	3	0	5	0	0	0	28	2
Athletic Bilbao	2016–17	La Liga	35	7	3	0	8	0	–		46	7
Athletic Bilbao	2017–18	La Liga	14	4	0	0	6	1	–		20	5
Athletic Bilbao	2018–19	La Liga	34	7	3	0	–		–		37	7
Athletic Bilbao	2019–20	La Liga	31	5	7 (Note: Includes appearance in 2020 Copa del Rey final (played in 2021))	1	–		–		38	6
Athletic Bilbao	2020–21	La Liga	28	5	5	0	–		2 (Note: Appearances in Supercopa de España)	0	35	5
Athletic Bilbao	2021–22	La Liga	35	4	4	2	–		2	0	41	6
Athletic Bilbao	2022–23	La Liga	30	0	6	2	–		–		36	2
Athletic Bilbao	2023–24	La Liga	20	2	5	1	–		–		25	3
Athletic Bilbao	Total		434	56	61	10	61	10	4	0	560	76
San Lorenzo	2024	Primera División	14	3	–		–		–		14	3
San Lorenzo	2025	Primera División	11	1	1	0	–		–		12	1
San Lorenzo	Total		25	4	1	0	–		–		26	4
Career total			478	63	62	10	61	10	4	0	605	83

=== International ===
Appearances and goals by national team and year
National team	Year	Apps	Goals
Spain	2012	1	0
Spain	2013	0	0
Spain	2014	0	0
Spain	2015	0	0
Spain	2016	0	0
Spain	2017	0	0
Spain	2018	0	0
Spain	2019	1	0
Total		2	0

== Honours ==
Athletic Bilbao

- Copa del Rey: 2023–24; runner-up: 2011–12, 2019–20, 2020–21
- Supercopa de España: 2021
- UEFA Europa League runner-up: 2011–12

Spain U17

- FIFA U-17 World Cup third place: 2009

Spain U19

- UEFA European Under-19 Championship runner-up: 2010

Spain U21

- UEFA European Under-21 Championship: 2011, 2013

Individual

- La Liga Breakthrough Player of the Year: 2010–11
- European Golden Boy: shortlisted 2010, 2011, 2012
- La Liga Team of the Season: 2021–22

== See also ==
- List of Athletic Bilbao players
- List of footballers with 400 or more La Liga appearances
