= Adrien Goñi =

Spanish footballer

Personal information
- Full name: Adrien Goñi Cariñanos
- Date of birth: 25 August 1988 (age 38)
- Place of birth: Pamplona, Spain
- Height: 1.73 m (5 ft 8 in)
- Position: Attacking midfielder

Youth career
- Txantrea
- 2003–2006: Athletic Bilbao

Senior career*
Years	Team	Apps	(Gls)
2006–2007	Basconia	36	(9)
2007–2011	Bilbao Athletic	114	(19)
2009	Athletic Bilbao	1	(0)
2011	Girona	1	(0)
2011–2012	Sporting Mahonés	14	(0)
2012	Orihuela	10	(0)
2012–2013	Amorebieta	26	(5)
2013–2015	Logroñés	38	(6)
2015–2016	La Roda	48	(7)
2016–2017	Amorebieta	31	(4)
2017–2020	Calahorra	84	(16)
2020–2021	Racing Rioja	22	(5)
2021–2023	Txantrea	42	(7)
Total		467	(78)
- * Club domestic league appearances and goals

Adrien Goñi Cariñanos (born 25 August 1988) is a Spanish former professional footballer who played as an attacking midfielder.

== Club career ==
Goñi was born in Pamplona, Navarre. Another product of Athletic Bilbao's prolific youth ranks, he made his debut for the first team in the dying stages of the 2008–09 campaign, starting in a 1–1 La Liga away draw against Sporting de Gijón on 3 May.

On 27 January 2011, after almost two full seasons being solely used by the reserves in the Segunda División B, scoring a total of nine goals, Goñi terminated his contract with the club and signed a three-year deal with Girona FC of Segunda División, with Athletic having an option to rebuy in the first two. He played his only match in the competition on 21 May, coming in as a late substitute in the 0–2 home loss to FC Barcelona B.

In August 2011, Goñi joined CF Sporting Mahonés of the third tier. In the following transfer window, as the Balearic Islands club folded, he moved to another team in that league, Orihuela CF.

Goñi settled rarely subsequently, spending the 2012–13 campaign with SD Amorebieta, two years at UD Logroñés and another with La Roda CF, always in the third division. In summer 2016, he returned to Amorebieta.

Until his retirement at age 34, Goñi competed in the lower leagues but also in amateur football, representing CD Calahorra, Racing Rioja CF and UDC Txantrea.

== Personal life ==
Goñi's younger brother Julen was also a footballer, who trained as a youth at Athletic and played as a right winger. The brothers were teammates during their time with Bilbao Athletic, along with their cousin Iker Muniain.
