= Las Llanas Stadium =

Football stadium in Sestao, Spain

Estadio Las Lianas
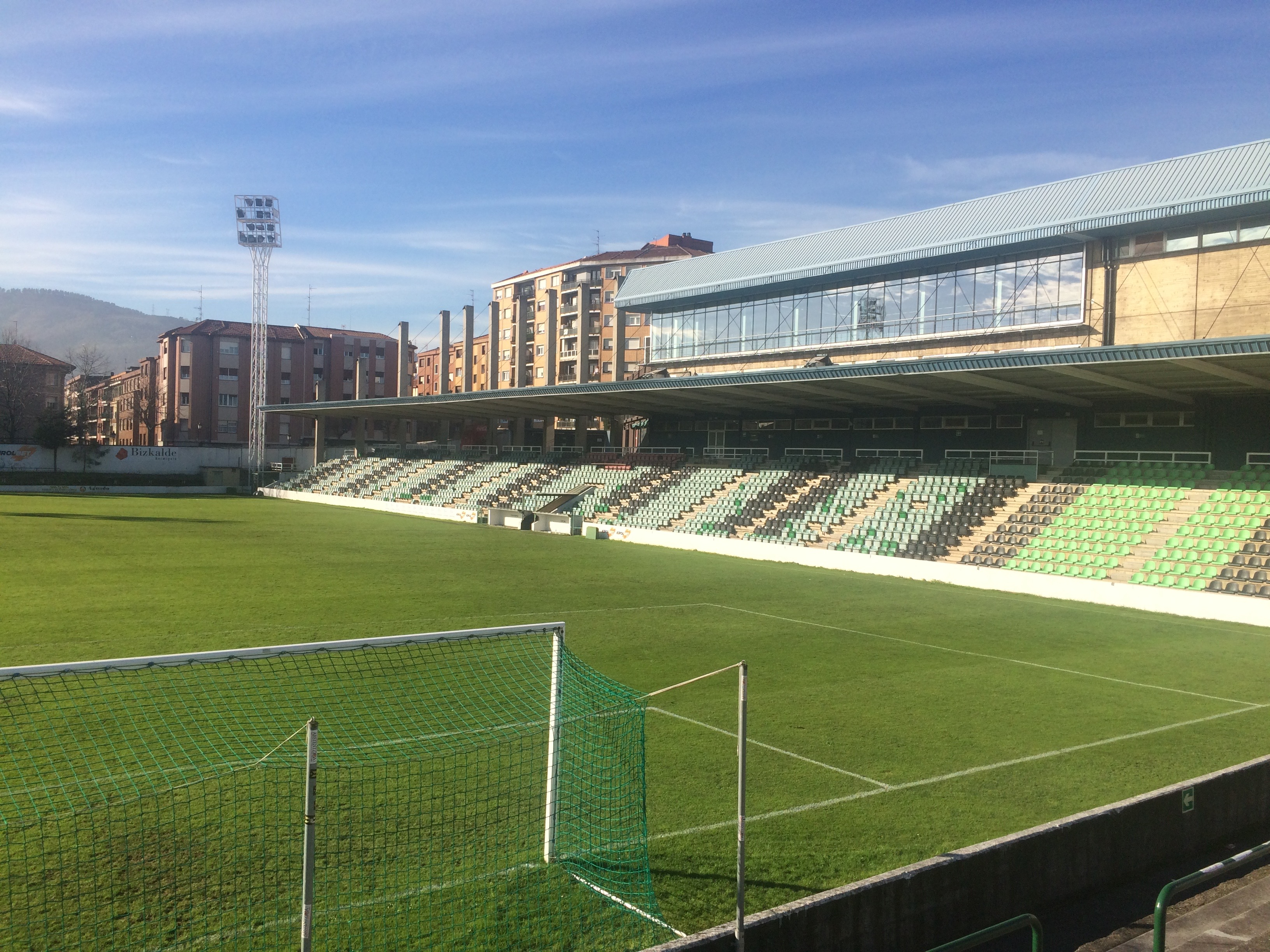
- Interactive map of Estadio Las Lianas
- Full name: Campo Municipal de Las Llanas
- Location: Sestao, Spain
- Coordinates: 43.3108°N 3.0098°W
- Owner: Sestao City Council
- Capacity: 4,367
- Surface: Grass
- Field size: 102x64m

Construction
- Built: 1923
- Opened: 9 September 1923
- Renovated: 1950 and 1975

Tenants
- Sestao Sport Club (1923–1996); Sestao River Club (1996–Present); Sociedad Deportiva San Pedro

The Las Llanas Municipal Stadium (Spanish: Campo municipal de Las Llanas), is a municipal football stadium located in Sestao (Biscay, Spain). It was opened in 1923 and has a capacity for 4,367 spectators. The Sestao River Club and Sociedad Deportiva San Pedro play their home matches there.

== History ==
The Las Llanas municipal field was inaugurated in 1923, in a match between Sestao Sport Club and Sociedad Deportiva Kaiku (then a subsidiary club of Sestao Sport and now a rowing club). Until 1956, its owner was a family from Sestao, but in that year, due to problems between the family and Sestao Sport, the Sestao City Council declared itself in favour of the green-black team and expropriated the field, thus converting it into a municipal stadium.

On September 19, 2014, it was announced that Las Llanas would serve as the training venue for one of the teams participating in the UEFA Euro 2020, thanks to an agreement reached between the Sestao City Council and the Bilbao Ekintza organization. Over the years, the stadium has undergone various modifications to adapt to modern times. The first of these was the construction of the Main Stand, partially covered (occupying the central section of the current stand). Later, another stand, the South End Stand, was added and was also fully covered.

Coinciding with the construction of the Las Llanas Municipal Fronton adjacent to the field, the East Preference Stand was built, which was later fully covered with the metal structure that remains to this day. Additionally, the North End Stand was constructed, elevated above the Las Llanas school.

In the mid-1970s, the stadium was remodeled again, with the South End Stand being demolished, leaving it uncovered and at ground level. The roof of the Main Stand, now adjacent to the Las Llanas sports center, was also replaced, becoming fully covered with a metal structure.

In recent years, the Sestao City Council has undertaken several improvements, such as the gradual replacement of the seats in the Main Stand and the renovation of the home and away locker rooms. In 2016, the City Council carried out the construction of new dugouts and an entry/exit tunnel to the field, as well as addressing a defect in the bulging areas of the pitch.

In the summer of 2016, the Sestao City Council undertook a significant series of actions (14 in total, with an investment of over €110,000) to prepare the facility for the new season. Key improvements included leveling and aligning the pitch, particularly in the penalty area zones where a noticeable bulging had developed over time, the complete replacement of the Main Stand seats, the installation of a new scoreboard, and the creation of new dugouts and a field access tunnel. These upgrades were carried out alongside the routine maintenance tasks typically performed during the summer period.

== Characteristics ==
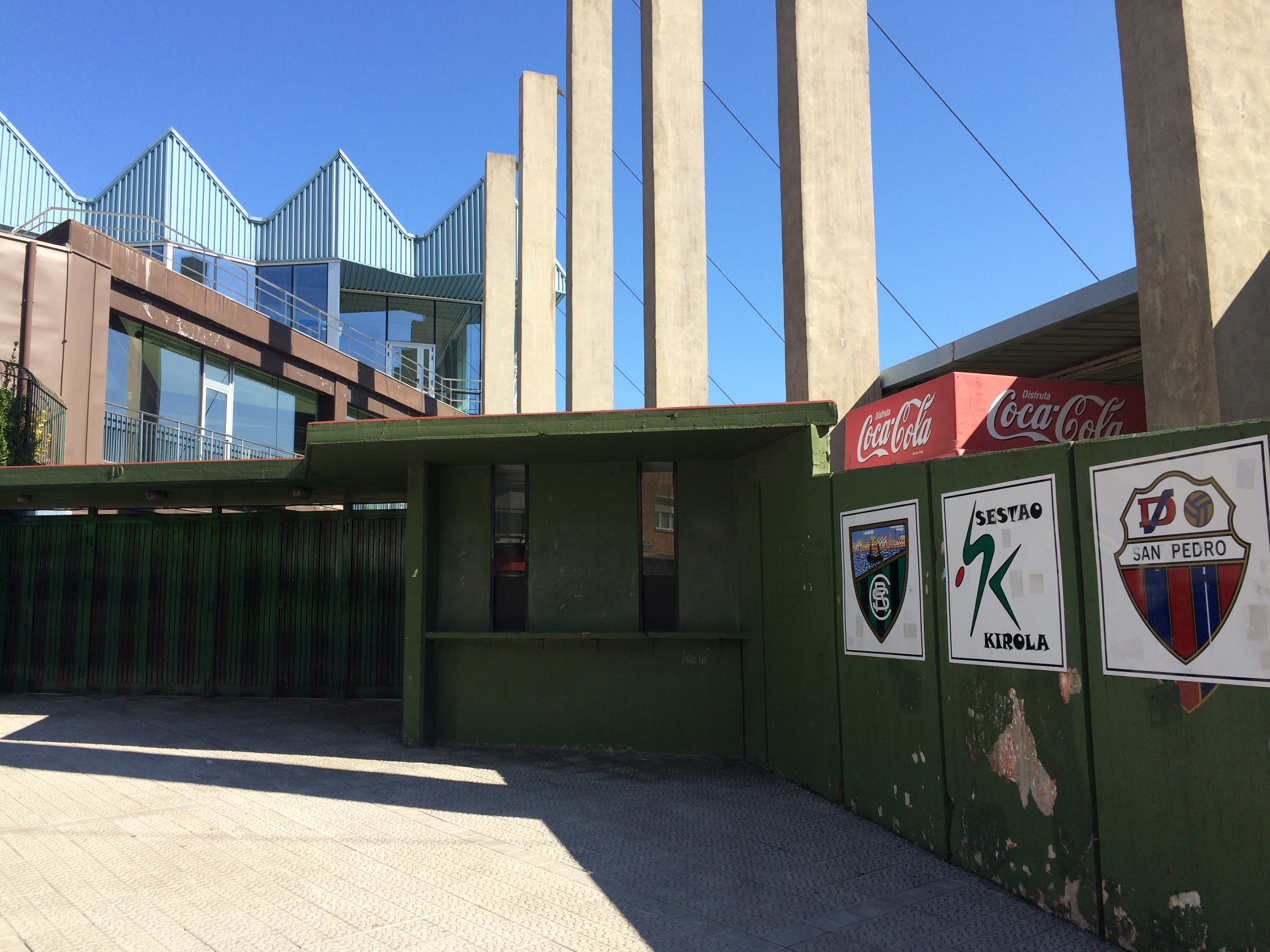
Entrance of the Las Llanas Municipal Stadium

The Las Llanas Municipal Stadium has two entrances: one providing access to the Main Stand and the other to the East Preference Stand. Both entrances are located on Alameda Las Llanas.

Both the Main Stand and the East Preference Stand of the stadium are covered. The Main Stand features seats in green and black, the representative colors of the municipality of Sestao, while the other stands (East Preference and the End Stands) are paved. The pitch is illuminated by four floodlight towers, enabling matches to be played in the evening.

The Las Llanas Municipal Stadium features a VIP box, a press room, press boxes, two bars, and meets the required accessibility standards for people with disabilities.

== Owner ==
The owner of the Las Llanas Municipal Stadium is the Sestao City Council, which delegates the care and maintenance of the pitch, as well as the general cleaning of the facility, through an agreement with the Sestao River Club.

== Usage ==
The Las Llanas Municipal Stadium is the home ground for both the Sestao River Club and the Sociedad Deportiva San Pedro. However, as a municipal stadium, it can also be rented by anyone wishing to use it, upon payment of the corresponding fee.

=== Bilbao Metro ===
300 metres from the Las Llanas municipal field is the Sestao station (Kasko exit) of the Bilbao Metro (L2).

=== BizkaiBus ===
The BizkaiBus lines A2315, A2336, A3122, A3129, A3135, A3131, and A3335 all have stops located 110 meters from the Las Llanas Municipal Stadium.

=== Renfe commuter trains ===
The closest Cercanías Bilbao stations to the Las Llanas Municipal Stadium are La Iberia (800 meters), Galindo (850 meters), and Sestao (1600 meters).
