= El Palmar CF =

Association football club in Spain

El Palmar
- Full name: El Palmar Club de Fútbol-Estrella Grana
- Founded: 2006
- Dissolved: 2026
- Ground: Polideportivo El Palmar, El Palmar, Murcia, Spain
- Capacity: 500
- Chairman: Francisco Hernández Pozuelo
- Manager: Juanfran Ibáñez
- 2025–26: Tercera Federación – Group 13, 14th of 18
Home colours	Away colours

El Palmar Club de Fútbol-Estrella Grana was a Spanish football team based in El Palmar, in the Region of Murcia. Founded in 2006 it last played in Tercera Federación – Group 13, holding home games at Polideportivo El Palmar.

On 30 June 2017, the club reached an agreement with CF Lorca Deportiva to become its reserve team, terminating the vinculation at the end of the season. In July 2026, the club had his Tercera Federación spot acquired by Cotillas CD, and subsequently was dissolved.

== Season to season ==
Season	Tier	Division	Place	Copa del Rey
2007–08	6	1ª Terr.	11th	
2008–09	6	Liga Aut.	5th	
2009–10	5	Terr. Pref.	17th	
2010–11	5	Pref. Aut.	11th	
2011–12	5	Pref. Aut.	2nd	
2012–13	4	3ª	10th	
2013–14	4	3ª	12th	
2014–15	4	3ª	12th	
2015–16	4	3ª	3rd	
2016–17	4	3ª	7th	

Season	Tier	Division	Place	Copa del Rey
2017–18	4	3ª	19th	N/A (Note: Reserve team of CF Lorca Deportiva.)
2018–19	5	Pref. Aut.	1st	
2019–20	4	3ª	14th	First round
2020–21	4	3ª	8th / 3rd	
2021–22	5	3ª RFEF	11th	
2022–23	5	3ª Fed.	10th	
2023–24	5	3ª Fed.	12th	
2024–25	5	3ª Fed.	9th	
2025–26	5	3ª Fed.	14th	

- 8 seasons in Tercera División
- 5 seasons in Tercera Federación/Tercera División RFEF
