= Conil CF =

Association football club in Spain

- Full name: Conil Club de Fútbol
- Nickname: La Huerta Mecánica
- Founded: 1931
- Ground: Jose Antonio Pérez Ureba, Conil, Andalusia, Spain
- Capacity: 1,500
- Chairman: (Spain) Antonio Brenes
- Manager: (Spain) Lázaro Luis Canto Marin
- League: Tercera Federación – Group 10
- 2025–26: Tercera Federación – Group 10, 8th of 18
Home colours	Away colours

Conil Club de Fútbol is a Spanish football team based in Conil, in the autonomous community of Andalusia. Founded in 1931, it plays in Tercera Federación – Group 10, holding home games at Estadio José Antonio Pérez Ureba, with a 1,500-seat capacity.

== History ==
In the 2018–19 season Conil finished in the 17th position in Tercera División, Group 10.

== Season to season ==
Season	Tier	Division	Place	Copa del Rey
1931–1970	—	Regional	—	
1970–71	5	2ª Reg.	3rd	
1971–72	5	2ª Reg.	4th	
1972–73	5	2ª Reg.	8th	
1973–74	5	2ª Reg.	18th	
1974–75	5	2ª Reg.	9th	
1975–76	6	2ª Reg.	5th	
1976–77	6	2ª Reg.		
1977–78	7	2ª Reg.	18th	
1978–79	7	2ª Reg.	16th	
1979–80	DNP			
1980–81	7	2ª Reg.	13th	
1981–82	7	2ª Reg.	12th	
1982–83	7	2ª Reg.	2nd	
1983–84	7	2ª Reg.	2nd	
1984–85	6	1ª Reg.	4th	
1985–86	6	1ª Reg.	2nd	
1986–87	5	Reg. Pref.	11th	
1987–88	5	Reg. Pref.	5th	
1988–89	5	Reg. Pref.	12th	

Season	Tier	Division	Place	Copa del Rey
1989–90	5	Reg. Pref.	8th	
1990–91	5	Reg. Pref.	10th	
1991–92	5	Reg. Pref.	6th	
1992–93	5	Reg. Pref.	1st	
1993–94	5	Reg. Pref.	1st	
1994–95	4	3ª	16th	
1995–96	4	3ª	17th	
1996–97	4	3ª	21st	
1997–98	5	Reg. Pref.	5th	
1998–99	5	Reg. Pref.	15th	
1999–2000	6	1ª Reg.	4th	
2000–01	5	Reg. Pref.	10th	
2001–02	5	Reg. Pref.	16th	
2002–03	6	1ª Reg.	6th	
2003–04	6	1ª Reg.	3rd	
2004–05	6	Reg. Pref.	4th	
2005–06	6	Reg. Pref.	2nd	
2006–07	5	1ª And.	7th	
2007–08	5	1ª And.	4th	
2008–09	5	1ª And.	2nd	

Season	Tier	Division	Place	Copa del Rey
2009–10	5	1ª And.	1st	
2010–11	4	3ª	14th	
2011–12	4	3ª	11th	
2012–13	4	3ª	12th	
2013–14	4	3ª	10th	
2014–15	4	3ª	7th	
2015–16	4	3ª	19th	
2016–17	5	Div. Hon.	7th.	
2017–18	5	Div. Hon.	3rd.	
2018–19	4	3ª	17th	
2019–20	4	3ª	12th	
2020–21	4	3ª	7th / 3rd	
2021–22	5	3ª RFEF	10th	
2022–23	5	3ª Fed.	9th	
2023–24	5	3ª Fed.	12th	
2024–25	5	3ª Fed.	12th	
2025–26	5	3ª Fed.	8th	
2026–27	5	3ª Fed.		

- 11 seasons in Tercera División
- 6 seasons in Tercera Federación/Tercera División RFEF

== Stadium information ==
- Name: Estadio José Antonio Pérez Ureba
- City: Conil de la Frontera
- Capacity: 4,000
- Inauguration: 1990
- Pitch size: 105 x 68 m
