= Silva SD =

Spanish football club

Coordinates: 43.351694°N 8.423028°W

Silva
- Full name: Silva Sociedad Deportiva
- Founded: 1940; 86 years ago
- Stadium: Campo de Fútbol Grela
- Capacity: 1,000
- President: Luís Varela Rodríguez
- Head coach: Diego Armando
- League: Tercera Federación – Group 1
- 2025–26: Tercera Federación – Group 1, 15th of 18
| Home colours | Away colours |

Silva Sociedad Deportiva is a Spanish football team based in A Coruña, in the autonomous community of Galicia. Founded on 6 June 1940 it currently plays in Tercera Federación – Group 1, holding home games at Campo de Fútbol Grela, which has a capacity of 1,000 spectators.

== Season to season ==
| Season | Tier | Division | Place | Copa del Rey |
|---|---|---|---|---|
| 1993–94 | 8 | 3ª Reg. | 5th | |
| 1994–95 | 8 | 3ª Reg. | 2nd | |
| 1995–96 | 8 | 3ª Reg. | 3rd | |
| 1996–97 | 8 | 3ª Reg. | 1st | |
| 1997–98 | 8 | 3ª Reg. | 6th | |
| 1998–99 | 8 | 3ª Reg. | 6th | |
| 1999–2000 | 8 | 3ª Reg. | 13th | |
| 2000–01 | 8 | 3ª Reg. | 9th | |
| 2001–02 | 8 | 3ª Reg. | 12th | |
| 2002–03 | 8 | 3ª Reg. | 9th | |
| 2003–04 | 8 | 3ª Reg. | 6th | |
| 2004–05 | 8 | 3ª Reg. | 5th | |
| 2005–06 | 8 | 3ª Reg. | 2nd | |
| 2006–07 | 7 | 2ª Aut. | 17th | |
| 2007–08 | 8 | 3ª Aut. | 3rd | |
| 2008–09 | 7 | 2ª Aut. | 14th | |
| 2009–10 | 7 | 2ª Aut. | 5th | |
| 2010–11 | 7 | 2ª Aut. | 1st | |
| 2011–12 | 6 | 1ª Aut. | 1st | |
| 2012–13 | 5 | Pref. Aut. | 14th | |

| Season | Tier | Division | Place | Copa del Rey |
|---|---|---|---|---|
| 2013–14 | 5 | Pref. Aut. | 3rd | |
| 2014–15 | 4 | 3ª | 16th | |
| 2015–16 | 4 | 3ª | 13th | |
| 2016–17 | 4 | 3ª | 9th | |
| 2017–18 | 4 | 3ª | 11th | |
| 2018–19 | 4 | 3ª | 12th | |
| 2019–20 | 4 | 3ª | 12th | |
| 2020–21 | 4 | 3ª | 6th / 6th | |
| 2021–22 | 5 | 3ª RFEF | 10th | |
| 2022–23 | 5 | 3ª Fed. | 12th | |
| 2023–24 | 5 | 3ª Fed. | 12th | |
| 2024–25 | 5 | 3ª Fed. | 13th | |
| 2025–26 | 5 | 3ª Fed. | 15th | |
| 2026–27 | 5 | 3ª Fed. | | |

- 7 seasons in Tercera División
- 6 seasons in Tercera Federación/Tercera División RFEF

== Honours ==
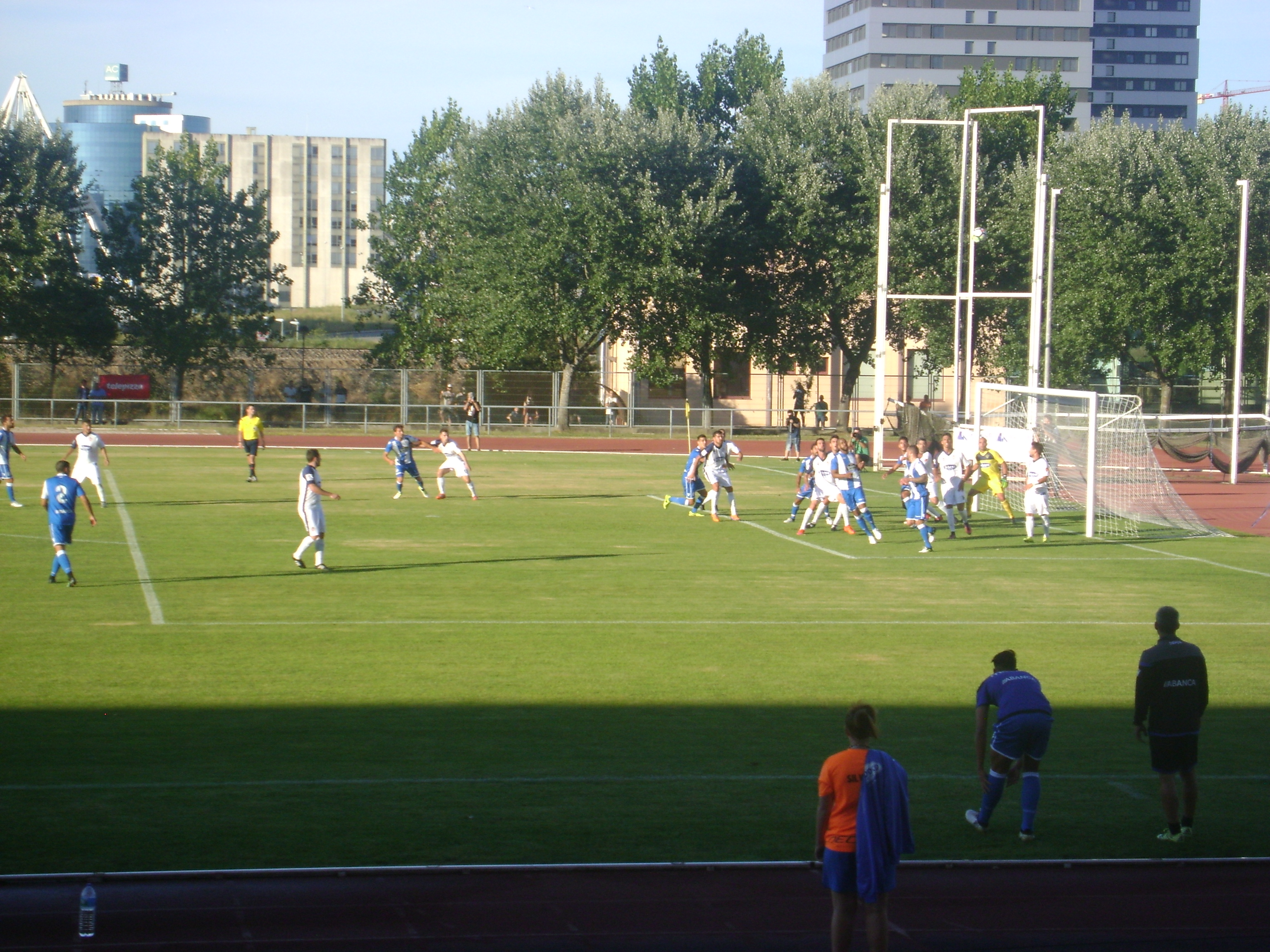
SD Silva vs. Deportivo de La Coruña.

- Primeira Autonómica: 2011–12
- Segunda Autonómica: 2010–11
- Terceira Autonómica: 1996–97
