= CD Colunga =

Association football club in Spain

Coordinates: 43.491037°N 5.267846°W

Colunga
- Full name: Club Deportivo Colunga
- Founded: 1934
- Ground: Campo de Santianes, Colunga, Asturias, Spain
- Capacity: 2,000
- Head coach: Jano Vázquez
- League: Tercera Federación – Group 2
- 2025–26: Tercera Federación – Group 2, 11th of 18
- Website: http://cdcolunga.es
Home colours	Away colours

Club Deportivo Colunga is a Spanish football club based in Colunga, in the autonomous community of Asturias. Founded in 1934, they play in Tercera Federación – Group 2.

== History ==
Founded in 1934, CD Colunga played its entire history in the Regional divisions until it was promoted for the first time to the Tercera División in May 2015.

== Season to season ==
Season	Tier	Division	Place	Copa del Rey
1953–54	5	2ª Reg.		
1954–55	5	2ª Reg.		
1955–56	5	2ª Reg.		
1956–57	5	2ª Reg.		
1957–58	5	2ª Reg.	7th	
1958–59	5	2ª Reg.	7th	
1959–60	5	2ª Reg.	13th	
1960–61	5	2ª Reg.	6th	
1961–62	5	2ª Reg.	10th	
1962–1968	DNP			
1968–69	5	2ª Reg.	10th	
1969–70	5	2ª Reg.	10th	
1970–71	5	2ª Reg.	9th	
1971–72	5	2ª Reg.	6th	
1972–73	5	2ª Reg.	11th	
1973–74	6	2ª Reg.	3rd	
1974–75	6	2ª Reg.	3rd	
1975–76	6	2ª Reg.	6th	
1976–77	6	2ª Reg.	5th	
1977–78	7	2ª Reg.	12th	

Season	Tier	Division	Place	Copa del Rey
1978–79	DNP			
1979–80	DNP			
1980–81	7	2ª Reg.	7th	
1981–82	7	2ª Reg.	9th	
1982–83	7	2ª Reg.	8th	
1983–84	7	2ª Reg.	13th	
1984–85	7	2ª Reg.	5th	
1985–86	7	2ª Reg.	8th	
1986–87	7	2ª Reg.	4th	
1987–88	7	2ª Reg.	4th	
1988–89	7	2ª Reg.	1st	
1989–90	6	1ª Reg.	7th	
1990–91	6	1ª Reg.	10th	
1991–92	6	1ª Reg.	13th	
1992–93	6	1ª Reg.	(R)	
1993–94	7	2ª Reg.	13th	
1994–95	7	2ª Reg.	14th	
1995–96	7	2ª Reg.	16th	
1996–97	DNP			
1997–98	7	2ª Reg.	14th	

Season	Tier	Division	Place	Copa del Rey
1998–99	7	2ª Reg.	15th	
1999–2000	7	2ª Reg.	2nd	
2000–01	7	2ª Reg.	3rd	
2001–02	7	2ª Reg.	7th	
2002–03	7	2ª Reg.	4th	
2003–04	7	2ª Reg.	17th	
2004–05	7	2ª Reg.	18th	
2005–06	7	2ª Reg.	10th	
2006–07	7	2ª Reg.	8th	
2007–08	7	2ª Reg.	18th	
2008–09	7	2ª Reg.	11th	
2009–10	7	2ª Reg.	9th	
2010–11	7	2ª Reg.	1st	
2011–12	6	1ª Reg.	2nd	
2012–13	5	Reg. Pref.	16th	
2013–14	5	Reg. Pref.	5th	
2014–15	5	Reg. Pref.	2nd	
2015–16	4	3ª	6th	
2016–17	4	3ª	11th	
2017–18	4	3ª	13th	

Season	Tier	Division	Place	Copa del Rey
2018–19	4	3ª	12th	
2019–20	4	3ª	19th	
2020–21	4	3ª	8th / 4th	
2021–22	5	3ª RFEF	6th	
2022–23	5	3ª Fed.	10th	
2023–24	5	3ª Fed.	10th	
2024–25	5	3ª Fed.	9th	
2025–26	5	3ª Fed.	11th	
2026–27	5	3ª Fed.		

- 6 seasons in Tercera División
- 6 seasons in Tercera Federación/Tercera División RFEF

== Notable players ==
- (Spain) Dani Borreguero
