= Alcantarilla FC =

Association football club in Spain

Alcantarilla
- Full name: Alcantarilla Fútbol Club
- Founded: 2012
- Ground: Ángel Sornichero, Alcantarilla, Murcia, Spain
- Capacity: 4,000
- President: Gabriel Esturillo
- Manager: David Zamora
- League: Tercera Federación – Group 13
- 2025–26: Preferente Autonómica, 1st of 18 (champions)
| Home colours | Away colours |

Alcantarilla Fútbol Club is a Spanish football team based in Alcantarilla, in the Region of Murcia. Founded in 2012, it plays in Tercera Federación – Group 13, and holding home matches at Polideportivo Municipal Ángel Sornichero.

== History ==
Alcantarilla previously had Alcantarilla CF as the main club in the city, as they were a reserve team of Atlético Madrid and also played in Tercera División for three seasons before folding in 1992.

A result of the merger between La Raya CF and Thader Murcia CF, the club was founded on 15 August 2012 as Thader Alcantarilla Fútbol Club, and immediately took UD Águilas' place in the Preferente Autonómica. In 2015, the club was renamed to Alcantarilla Fútbol Club.

In May 2022, Alcantarilla achieved their first-ever promotion to Tercera Federación, taking a club from the city to a national division after 37 years of absence.

== Season to season ==
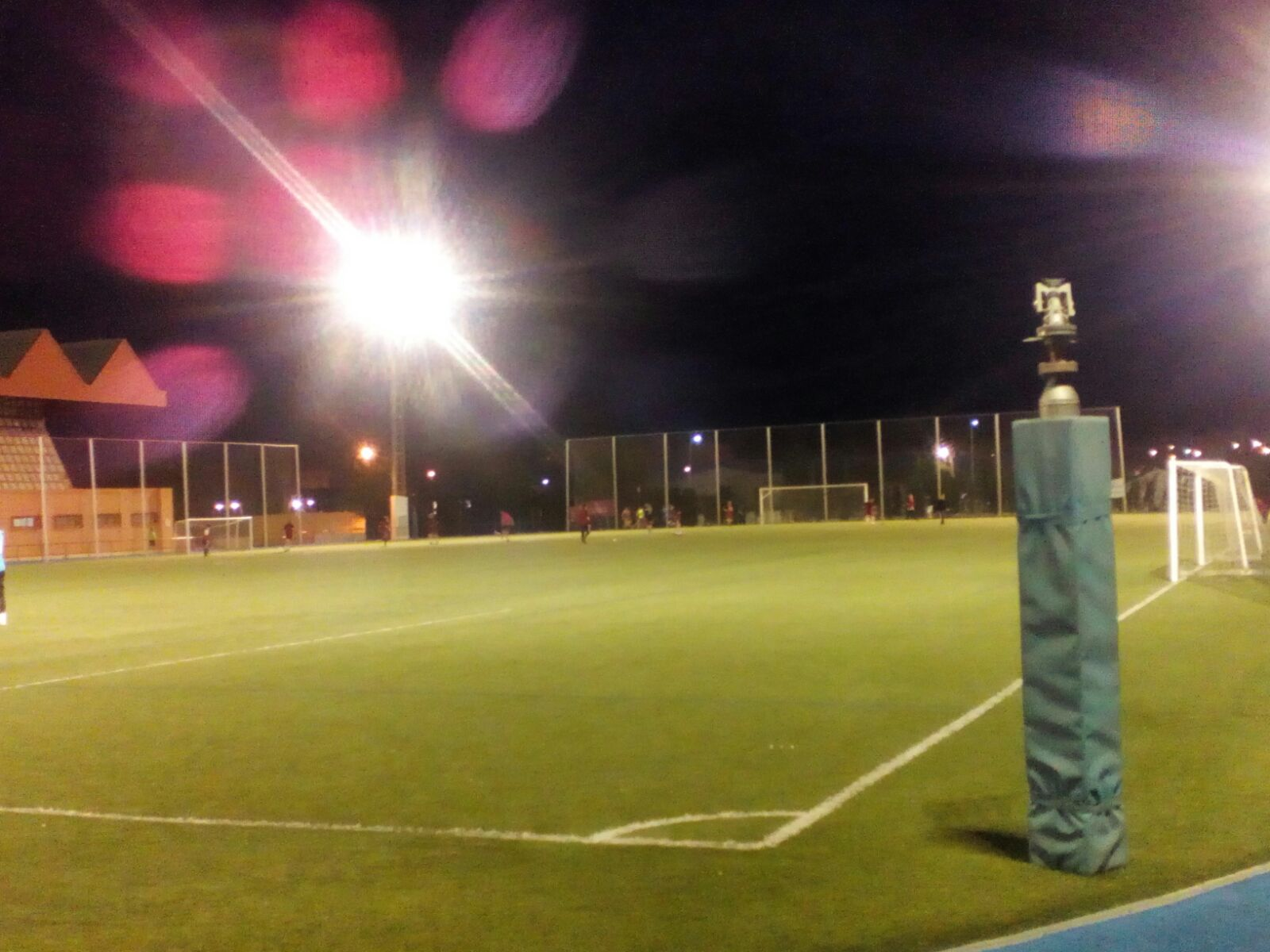
Polideportivo Municipal Ángel Sornichero in 2016

| Season | Tier | Division | Place | Copa del Rey |
|---|---|---|---|---|
| 2012–13 | 5 | Pref. Aut. | 13th | |
| 2013–14 | 5 | Pref. Aut. | 16th | |
| 2014–15 | 6 | 1ª Aut. | 11th | |
| 2015–16 | 6 | 1ª Aut. | 3rd | |
| 2016–17 | 5 | Pref. Aut. | 9th | |
| 2017–18 | 5 | Pref. Aut. | 18th | |
| 2018–19 | 6 | 1ª Aut. | 6th | |
| 2019–20 | 6 | 1ª Aut. | 6th | |
| 2020–21 | 5 | Pref. Aut. | 11th | |
| 2021–22 | 6 | Pref. Aut. | 1st | |
| 2022–23 | 5 | 3ª Fed. | 14th | |
| 2023–24 | 5 | 3ª Fed. | 14th | |
| 2024–25 | 5 | 3ª Fed. | 17th | |
| 2025–26 | 6 | Pref. Aut. | 1st | |
| 2026–27 | 5 | 3ª Fed. | | |

- 4 seasons in Tercera Federación
