= CD Derio =

Association football club in Spain

Derio
- Full name: Club Deportivo Derio
- Founded: 1977
- Ground: Ibaiondo
- Capacity: 1,500
- President: Javier Rodriguez Rodriguez
- Manager: Iker Muniain
- League: Tercera Federación – Group 4
- 2025–26: Tercera Federación – Group 4, 3rd of 18
- Website: cdderio.com
Home colours	Away colours

Club Deportivo Derio is a Spanish football club based in Derio, Biscay, in the autonomous community of Basque Country. Founded in 1977, it plays in Tercera Federación – Group 4, holding home games at Campo de Fútbol Municipal Ibaiondo, with a capacity of 1,500 people.

== History ==
Founded in 1977, Derio first reached the Regional Preferente in 1983. The club suffered immediate relegation, and only returned to the fifth division in 2008, with the category now named División de Honor.

On 3 June 2023, Derio achieved their first ever promotion to the Tercera Federación.

== Season to season ==
Season	Tier	Division	Place	Copa del Rey
1977–78	7	2ª Reg.	6th	
1978–79	7	2ª Reg.	2nd	
1979–80	7	2ª Reg.	2nd	
1980–81	6	1ª Reg.	8th	
1981–82	6	1ª Reg.	16th	
1982–83	6	1ª Reg.	2nd	
1983–84	5	Reg. Pref.	18th	
1984–85	6	1ª Reg.	8th	
1985–86	6	1ª Reg.	10th	
1986–87	6	1ª Reg.	4th	
1987–88	6	1ª Reg.	9th	
1988–89	6	1ª Reg.	9th	
1989–90	6	1ª Reg.	10th	
1990–91	6	1ª Terr.	17th	
1991–92	7	2ª Terr.	2nd	
1992–93	6	1ª Terr.	17th	
1993–94	7	2ª Terr.	6th	
1994–95	7	2ª Terr.	7th	
1995–96	7	2ª Terr.	10th	
1996–97	7	2ª Terr.	9th	

Season	Tier	Division	Place	Copa del Rey
1997–98	7	2ª Terr.	3rd	
1998–99	7	2ª Terr.	5th	
1999–2000	7	2ª Terr.	7th	
2000–01	7	2ª Terr.	1st	
2001–02	6	1ª Terr.	10th	
2002–03	7	1ª Div.	1st	
2003–04	6	Pref.	6th	
2004–05	6	Pref.	12th	
2005–06	6	Pref.	11th	
2006–07	6	Pref.	8th	
2007–08	6	Pref.	2nd	
2008–09	5	Div. Hon.	13th	
2009–10	5	Div. Hon.	10th	
2010–11	5	Div. Hon.	9th	
2011–12	5	Div. Hon.	10th	
2012–13	5	Div. Hon.	4th	
2013–14	5	Div. Hon.	11th	
2014–15	5	Div. Hon.	11th	
2015–16	5	Div. Hon.	14th	
2016–17	5	Div. Hon.	4th	

Season	Tier	Division	Place	Copa del Rey
2017–18	5	Div. Hon.	8th	
2018–19	5	Div. Hon.	9th	
2019–20	5	Div. Hon.	10th	
2020–21	5	Div. Hon.	11th	
2021–22	6	Div. Hon.	5th	
2022–23	6	Div. Hon.	1st	
2023–24	5	3ª Fed.	10th	
2024–25	5	3ª Fed.	8th	
2025–26	5	3ª Fed.	3rd	
2026–27	5	3ª Fed.		

- 4 seasons in Tercera Federación
