= Santa Cruz de Bezana =

- Municipality
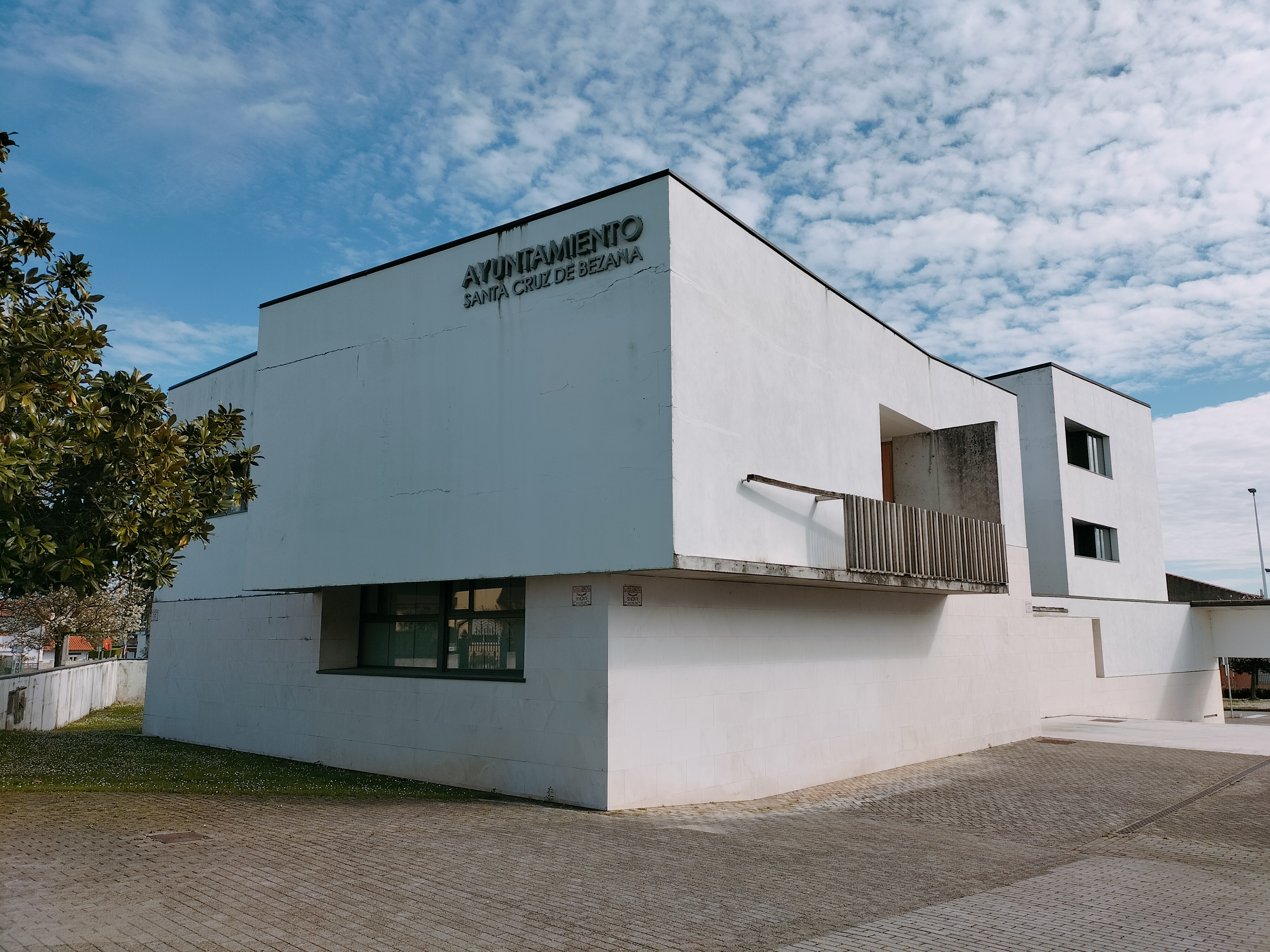
- Town hall

- Flag Coat of arms

- Location in Spain
- Coordinates: 43°26′39″N 3°54′11″W
- Country: Spain
- Autonomous community: Cantabria
- Province: Cantabria
- Comarca: Santander

Government
  - Mayor: María Carmen Pérez Tejedor

Area
  - Total: 17.2 km^{2} (6.6 sq mi)
- Elevation: 45 m (148 ft)

Population (2025-01-01)
  - Total: 13,904
  - Density: 808/km^{2} (2,090/sq mi)
- Time zone: UTC+1 (CET)
  - Summer (DST): UTC+2 (CEST)
- Website: Official website

Santa Cruz de Bezana is a municipality located in the autonomous community of Cantabria, Spain.

== Localilities ==
- Azoños
- Maoño
- Mompía
- Prezanes
- Sancibrián
- Bezana (capital)
- Soto de la Marina

== Twin towns ==
- Martignas-sur-Jalle, France
