= UD Santa Marta =

Association football club in Spain

Santa Marta
- Full name: Unión Deportiva Santa Marta
- Founded: 1982
- Ground: Alfonso San Casto, Santa Marta, Castile and León, Spain
- Capacity: 1,500
- Chairman: (Spain) Raúl Sánchez
- Manager: (Spain) Mario Sánchez
- League: Tercera Federación – Group 8
- 2025–26: Tercera Federación – Group 8, 5th of 18
Home colours	Away colours

Unión Deportiva Santa Marta is a Spanish football team based in Santa Marta de Tormes, in the autonomous community of Castile and León. Founded in 1982 it plays in Tercera Federación – Group 8, holding home games at Estadio Alfonso San Casto, with a capacity of 1,500 seats.

== History ==
Since 1985, population growth in Santa Marta area has led to the development of the UD Santa Marta.

== Season to season ==
Season	Tier	Division	Place	Copa del Rey
1991–92	6	1ª Reg.		
1992–93	6	1ª Reg.		
1993–94	6	1ª Reg.		
1994–95	6	1ª Reg.		
1995–96	6	1ª Reg.		
1996–97	5	Reg. Pref.	11th	
1997–98	5	Reg. Pref.	11th	
1998–99	5	Reg. Pref.	6th	
1999–2000	5	1ª Reg.	1st	
2000–01	4	3ª	8th	
2001–02	4	3ª	18th	
2002–03	5	1ª Reg.	1st	
2003–04	4	3ª	19th	
2004–05	5	1ª Reg.	9th	
2005–06	5	1ª Reg.	7th	
2006–07	5	1ª Reg.	1st	
2007–08	4	3ª	10th	
2008–09	4	3ª	12th	
2009–10	4	3ª	16th	
2010–11	4	3ª	19th	

Season	Tier	Division	Place	Copa del Rey
2011–12	5	1ª Reg.	1st	
2012–13	4	3ª	17th	
2013–14	4	3ª	19th	
2014–15	5	1ª Reg.	1st	
2015–16	4	3ª	19th	
2016–17	5	1ª Reg.	2nd	
2017–18	5	1ª Reg.	2nd	
2018–19	4	3ª	13th	
2019–20	4	3ª	15th	
2020–21	4	3ª	9th / 3rd	
2021–22	5	3ª RFEF	13th	
2022–23	5	3ª Fed.	14th	
2023–24	5	3ª Fed.	9th	
2024–25	5	3ª Fed.	11th	
2025–26	5	3ª Fed.	5th	
2026–27	5	3ª Fed.		

- 12 seasons in Tercera División
- 6 seasons in Tercera División RFEF/Tercera División RFEF

== Former players ==
- (Democratic Republic of the Congo) Cedric Mabwati (youth)
