= Estadio Municipal de Miramar =

Football stadium in Luanco, Spain

Miramar
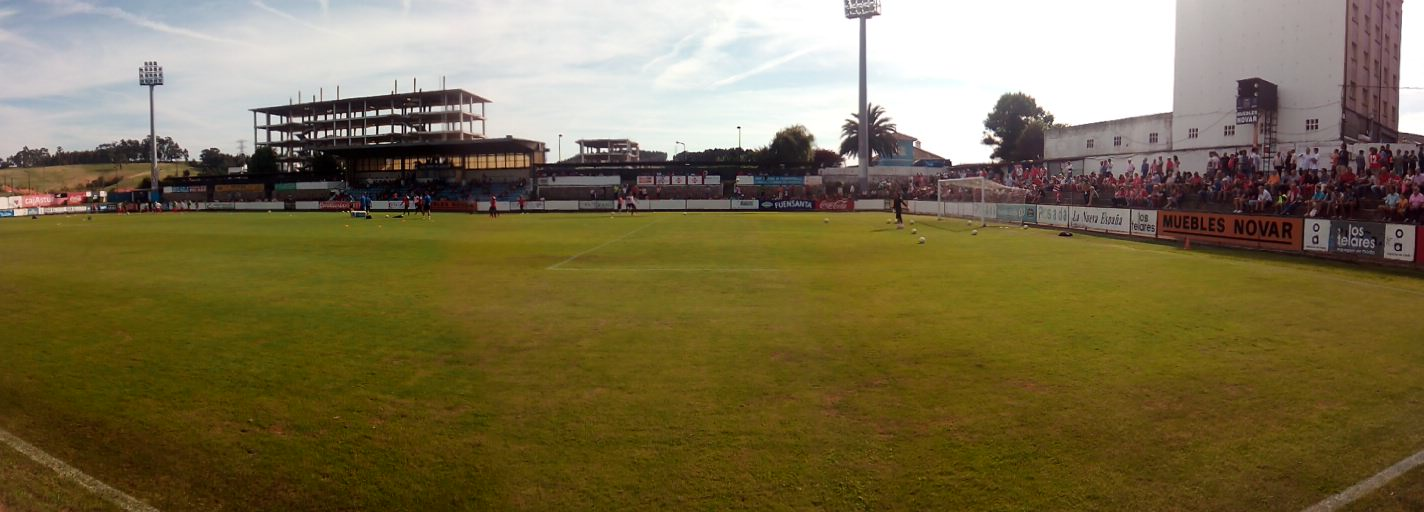
- Interactive map of Miramar
- Full name: Estadio Municipal de Miramar
- Location: Luanco, Spain
- Coordinates: 43.613661°N 5.800085°W
- Owner: Ayuntamiento de Gozón
- Capacity: 3,500
- Surface: Grass
- Scoreboard: Manual
- Record attendance: 5,000 (Marino de Luanco vs Deportivo de La Coruña, 7 November 2001)
- Field size: 103 m × 65 m (338 ft × 213 ft)

Construction
- Opened: 6 September 1953
- Architect: José Manuel Busto

Tenant
- Marino de Luanco

The Estadio Municipal de Miramar is a football stadium located in Luanco, Asturias, Spain. The stadium is the home ground of Club Marino de Luanco.
