= 2025–26 Tercera Federación =

Tercera Federación
- Season: 2025–26
- Dates: 5 September 2025 – June 2026

The 2025–26 Tercera Federación season is the fifth for the Tercera Federación, the national fifth level in the Spanish football league system. It consists of 18 groups with 18 teams each.

== Competition format ==
- The group champions will be promoted to 2026–27 Segunda Federación.
- The champion of each group will qualify for the 2026–27 Copa del Rey. If the champion is a reserve team, the first non-reserve team qualified will join the Copa.
- Relegations to the regional leagues will depend on which clubs are relegated in the 2025–26 Segunda Federación, as well as the number of the promoted teams for the ensuing season.

== Overview before the season ==
A total of 324 teams make up the league: 27 relegated from the 2024–25 Segunda Federación, 237 retained from the 2024–25 Tercera Federación, and 60 promoted from the regional divisions.

== Groups ==
=== Group 1 – Galicia ===
Teams retained from 2024–25 Tercera Federación

- Alondras
- Arosa
- Atlético Arteixo
- Barbadás
- Boiro
- Estradense
- Gran Peña
- Lugo B (Note: Polvorín changed name to Lugo B in July 2025.)
- Noia
- Racing Villalbés
- Silva
- Somozas
- Viveiro

Teams relegated from 2024–25 Segunda Federación

- Compostela
Location of teams of the 2025–26 Tercera Federación Group 1

Teams promoted from 2024–25 Preferente Futgal

- Barco
- Céltiga
- Juventud Cambados
- Montañeros

==== Teams and locations ====
Team	City	Home ground
Alondras	Cangas	O Morrazo
Arosa	Vilagarcía de Arousa	A Lomba
Atlético Arteixo	Arteixo	Ponte dos Brozos
Barbadás	Barbadás	Os Carrís
Barco	O Barco de Valdeorras	Calabagueiros
Boiro	Boiro	Barraña
Céltiga	A Illa de Arousa	Salvador Otero
Compostela	Santiago de Compostela	Vero Boquete
Estradense	A Estrada	Municipal
Gran Peña	Vigo	Barreiro
Juventud Cambados	Cambados	Municipal de Burgáns
Lugo B	Lugo	Anxo Carro
Montañeros	A Coruña	Elviña Grande
Noia	Noia	San Lázaro
Racing Villalbés	Vilalba	A Magdalena
Silva	A Coruña	A Grela
Somozas	As Somozas	Pardiñas
Viveiro	Viveiro	Cantarrana

==== League table ====
Pos	Team	Pld	W	D	L	GF	GA	GD	Pts	Qualification
1	Arosa (C, P)	34	20	10	4	58	35	+23	70	Promotion to Segunda Federación and qualification for Copa del Rey
2	Compostela (O, P)	34	19	11	4	55	28	+27	68	Qualification for the promotion playoffs
3	Atlético Arteixo	34	16	10	8	54	44	+10	58	Qualification for the promotion playoffs
4	Estradense	34	14	11	9	46	33	+13	53	Qualification for the promotion playoffs
5	Racing Villalbés	34	13	13	8	36	29	+7	52	Qualification for the promotion playoffs
6	Gran Peña	34	13	12	9	57	42	+15	51 (Note: Head-to-head points: Gran Peña 6 pts, Somozas 6 pts, Boiro 2 pts. Gran Peña finished ahead of Somozas on overall goal difference)	
7	Somozas	34	13	12	9	37	32	+5	51	
8	Boiro	34	13	12	9	45	29	+16	51	
9	Lugo B (Note: Lugo B was dissolved at the end of the season)	34	12	12	10	41	35	+6	48 (Note: Lugo B finished ahead of Montañeros on head-to-head points: Lugo B 1–0 Montañeros, Montañeros 1–1 Lugo B)	Dissolved
10	Montañeros	34	12	12	10	48	42	+6	48	
11	Barco	34	13	7	14	35	41	−6	46	
12	Alondras	34	12	9	13	45	48	−3	45	
13	Céltiga	34	11	7	16	47	48	−1	40	
14	Viveiro	34	9	11	14	27	41	−14	38	
15	Silva	34	9	9	16	36	48	−12	36	
16	Juventud Cambados (R)	34	4	14	16	24	43	−19	26	Relegation to Preferente Futgal
17	Noia (R)	34	6	7	21	28	57	−29	25	Relegation to Preferente Futgal
18	Barbadás (R)	34	4	7	23	25	69	−44	19	Relegation to Preferente Futgal

Rules for classification: 1) points; 2) head-to-head points; 3) head-to-head goal difference; 4) goal difference; 5) number of goals scored
(C) Champions; (O) Play-off winners; (P) Promoted; (R) Relegated

=== Group 2 – Asturias ===
Teams retained from 2024–25 Tercera Federación

- Avilés Stadium
- Caudal
- Ceares
- Colunga
- Covadonga
- L'Entregu
- Lenense
- Mosconia
- Praviano
- San Martín
- Sporting Atlético
- Titánico
- Tuilla

Teams relegated from 2024–25 Segunda Federación

- Llanera

Teams promoted from 2024–25 Primera Asturfútbol

- Gijón Industrial
- Llanes
- Navarro
- Siero

==== Teams and locations ====
Location of the 2025–26 Tercera Federación Group 2

Team	City	Home ground
Avilés Stadium	Avilés	Muro de Zaro
Caudal	Mieres	Hermanos Antuña
Ceares	Gijón	La Cruz
Colunga	Colunga	Santianes
Covadonga	Oviedo	Juan Antonio Álvarez Rabanal
Gijón Industrial	Gijón	Santa Cruz
L'Entregu	El Entrego, San Martín del Rey Aurelio	Nuevo Nalón
Lenense	Pona de Lena	El Sóton
Llanera	Llanera	Pepe Quimarán
Llanes	Llanes	San José
Mosconia	Grado	Marqués de la Vega de Anzo
Navarro	Valliniello, Avilés	Tabiella
Praviano	Pravia	Santa Catalina
San Martín	Sotrondio, San Martín del Rey Aurelio	El Florán
Siero	Pola de Siero, Siero	El Bayu
Sporting Atlético	Gijón	Pepe Ortiz
Titánico	Laviana	Las Tolvas
Tuilla	Tuilla, Langreo	El Candín

==== League table ====
Pos	Team	Pld	W	D	L	GF	GA	GD	Pts	Qualification
1	Llanera (Note: Llanera awarded a 0–3 win in their Round 27 match against Mosconia after the latter fielded an ineligible player. The match had originally ended 1–1) (C, P)	34	29	4	1	71	18	+53	91	Promotion to Segunda Federación and qualification for Copa del Rey
2	Covadonga	34	25	5	4	88	24	+64	80	Qualification for the promotion playoffs and Copa del Rey
3	Sporting Atlético	34	19	10	5	79	29	+50	67	Qualification for the promotion playoffs
4	Caudal	34	20	6	8	59	39	+20	66	Qualification for the promotion playoffs
5	Mosconia	34	16	7	11	46	29	+17	55	Qualification for the promotion playoffs
6	San Martín	34	14	9	11	36	36	0	51	
7	L'Entregu	34	13	10	11	41	42	−1	49	
8	Ceares	34	12	9	13	39	40	−1	45	
9	Praviano	34	11	9	14	36	42	−6	42	
10	Siero	34	11	8	15	39	49	−10	41	
11	Colunga	34	10	9	15	38	59	−21	39	
12	Llanes	34	8	13	13	44	51	−7	37	
13	Avilés Stadium	34	6	15	13	21	40	−19	33	
14	Gijón Industrial	34	7	11	16	36	57	−21	32 (Note: Gijón Industrial finished ahead of Lenense on overall goal difference)	
15	Lenense	34	7	11	16	36	58	−22	32	
16	Navarro (R)	34	6	13	15	38	53	−15	31	Relegation to Primera Asturfútbol
17	Tuilla (R)	34	7	6	21	31	60	−29	27	Relegation to Primera Asturfútbol
18	Titánico (R)	34	3	9	22	22	74	−52	18	Relegation to Primera Asturfútbol

Rules for classification: 1) points; 2) head-to-head points; 3) head-to-head goal difference; 4) goal difference; 5) number of goals scored
(C) Champions; (P) Promoted; (R) Relegated

=== Group 3 – Cantabria ===
Teams retained from 2024–25 Tercera Federación

- Atlético Albericia
- Barquereño
- Bezana
- Castro
- Cayón
- Colindres
- Guarnizo
- Revilla
- Torina
- Tropezón
- Vimenor

Teams relegated from 2024–25 Segunda Federación

- Escobedo
- Gimnástica Torrelavega
- Laredo

Teams promoted from 2024–25 Regional Preferente

- Cartes
- Montañas del Pas
- Noja
- Selaya

==== Teams and locations ====
Location of teams of the 2025–26 Tercera Federación Group 3

Team	City	Home ground
Atlético Albericia	Santander	Juan Hormaechea
Barquereño	San Vicente de la Barquera	El Castañar
Bezana	Santa Cruz de Bezana	Municipal
Cartes	Cartes	El Ansar
Castro	Castro Urdiales	Mioño
Cayón	Sarón	Fernando Astobiza
Colindres	Colindres	El Carmen
Escobedo	Escobedo, Camargo	Eusebio Arce
Gimnástica Torrelavega	Torrelavega	El Malecón
Guarnizo	Guarnizo, El Astillero	El Pilar
Laredo	Laredo	San Lorenzo
Montañas del Pas	Corvera de Toranzo	San Vicente de Toranzo
Noja	Noja	La Caseta
Revilla	Revilla, Camargo	El Crucero
Selaya	Selaya	El Castañal
Torina	Bárcena de Pie de Concha	Municipal
Tropezón	Tanos, Torrelavega	Santa Ana
Vimenor	Vioño de Piélagos, Piélagos	La Vidriera

==== League table ====
Pos	Team	Pld	W	D	L	GF	GA	GD	Pts	Qualification
1	Gimnástica Torrelavega (C, P)	34	26	5	3	86	15	+71	83	Promotion to Segunda Federación and qualification for Copa del Rey
2	Laredo	34	21	8	5	63	28	+35	71	Qualification for the promotion playoffs and Copa del Rey
3	Tropezón	34	21	4	9	50	27	+23	67	Qualification for the promotion playoffs
4	Guarnizo	34	19	9	6	47	26	+21	66	Qualification for the promotion playoffs
5	Escobedo	34	21	2	11	65	43	+22	65	Qualification for the promotion playoffs
6	Vimenor	34	17	8	9	47	36	+11	59	
7	Atlético Albericia	34	17	5	12	61	45	+16	56 (Note: Atlético Albericia finished ahead of Cayón on head-to-head goal difference: Atlético Albericia 3–0 Cayón, Cayón 2–1 Atlético Albericia)	
8	Cayón	34	17	5	12	50	41	+9	56	
9	Torina	34	15	8	11	39	40	−1	53	
10	Bezana	34	13	8	13	43	38	+5	47	
11	Castro	34	10	8	16	44	47	−3	38	
12	Selaya	34	8	8	18	32	44	−12	32	
13	Revilla	34	8	7	19	35	63	−28	31	
14	Barquereño	34	8	6	20	37	64	−27	30	
15	Cartes	34	6	10	18	28	52	−24	28 (Note: Cartes finished ahead of Colindres on head-to-head points: Cartes 2–0 Colindres, Colindres 0–1 Cartes)	
16	Colindres (R)	34	6	10	18	27	47	−20	28	Relegation to Regional Preferente
17	Montañas del Pas (R)	34	6	8	20	35	87	−52	26	Relegation to Regional Preferente
18	Noja (R)	34	4	7	23	22	68	−46	19	Relegation to Regional Preferente

Rules for classification: 1) points; 2) head-to-head points; 3) head-to-head goal difference; 4) goal difference; 5) number of goals scored
(C) Champions; (P) Promoted; (R) Relegated

=== Group 4 – Basque Country ===
Teams retained from 2024–25 Tercera Federación

- Alavés C
- Aretxabaleta
- Cultural Durango
- Derio
- Deusto
- Eibar C
- Lagun Onak
- Leioa
- Pasaia
- Portugalete
- San Ignacio
- Santurtzi
- Touring

Teams relegated from 2024–25 Segunda Federación

- Real Sociedad C

Teams promoted from 2024–25 División de Honor

- Añorga
- Aurrerá Vitoria
- Zamudio
- Zarautz

==== Teams and locations ====
Location of teams of the 2025–26 Tercera Federación Group 4

Team	City	Home ground
Alavés C	Vitoria-Gasteiz	José Luis Compañón
Añorga	San Sebastián	Campo de Rezola
Aretxabaleta	Aretxabaleta	Ibarra
Aurrerá Vitoria	Vitoria-Gasteiz	Olaranbe
Cultural Durango	Durango	Tabira
Derio	Derio	Ibaiondo
Deusto	Bilbao	Etxezuri
Eibar C	Eibar	Unbe
Lagun Onak	Azpeitia	Garmendipe
Leioa	Leioa	Sarriena
Pasaia	Pasaia	Don Bosco
Portugalete	Portugalete	La Florida
Real Sociedad C	San Sebastián	José Luis Orbegozo
San Ignacio	Vitoria-Gasteiz	Adurtzabal
Santurtzi	Santurtzi	San Jorge
Touring	Errenteria	Fandería
Zamudio	Zamudio	Gazituaga
Zarautz	Zarautz	Asti

==== League table ====
Pos	Team	Pld	W	D	L	GF	GA	GD	Pts	Qualification
1	Portugalete (C, P)	34	24	6	4	70	29	+41	78	Promotion to Segunda Federación and qualification for Copa del Rey
2	Leioa	34	18	7	9	50	34	+16	61	Qualification for the promotion playoffs
3	Derio	34	17	7	10	54	40	+14	58	Qualification for the promotion playoffs
4	Lagun Onak	34	17	6	11	54	34	+20	57 (Note: Lagun Onak finished ahead of Touring on head-to-head points: Touring 0–1 Lagun Onak, Lagun Onak 0–0 Touring)	Qualification for the promotion playoffs
5	Touring	34	16	9	9	47	35	+12	57	Qualification for the promotion playoffs
6	Real Sociedad C	34	17	4	13	48	39	+9	55 (Note: Real Sociedad C finished ahead of San Ignacio on head-to-head points: San Ignacio 2–3 Real Sociedad C, Real Sociedad C 0–0 San Ignacio)	
7	San Ignacio	34	16	7	11	37	27	+10	55	
8	Aurrerá Vitoria	34	16	6	12	42	41	+1	54	
9	Alavés C	34	15	8	11	57	40	+17	53	
10	Aretxabaleta	34	13	6	15	56	61	−5	45	
11	Cultural Durango	34	11	11	12	35	36	−1	44	
12	Santurtzi	34	9	12	13	32	45	−13	39	
13	Eibar C	34	9	9	16	44	53	−9	36 (Note: Eibar C finished ahead of Pasaia on head-to-head points: Pasaia 1–2 Eibar C, Eibar C 3–0 Pasaia)	
14	Pasaia (Note: Pasaia awarded a 0–3 victory in their Round 25 match against Deusto after the latter fielded an ineligible player. The match had originally ended 1–0)	34	9	9	16	26	46	−20	36	
15	Añorga	34	11	4	19	37	59	−22	34	
16	Zamudio (R)	34	9	6	19	42	59	−17	33	Relegation to División de Honor
17	Zarautz (R)	34	8	6	20	30	60	−30	30	Relegation to División de Honor
18	Deusto (Note: Deusto awarded a 3–0 victory in their Round 31 match against Añorga after the latter did not take the pitch. Añorga was subsequently deducted three points.) (R)	34	6	7	21	26	49	−23	25	Relegation to División de Honor

Rules for classification: 1) points; 2) head-to-head points; 3) head-to-head goal difference; 4) goal difference; 5) number of goals scored
(C) Champions; (P) Promoted; (R) Relegated

=== Group 5 – Catalonia ===
Location of teams of the 2025–26 Tercera Federación Group 5
Location of teams of the 2025–26 Tercera Federación Group 5 (Province of Barcelona)

Teams retained from 2024–25 Tercera Federación

- Badalona
- Cerdanyola del Vallès
- Europa B
- Grama
- L'Escala
- L'Hospitalet
- Manresa
- Mollerussa
- Montañesa
- Peralada
- San Cristóbal
- Tona
- Vilassar de Mar (Note: Retained after Som Maresme (formerly Badalona Futur) was denied registration in August.)

Teams relegated from 2024–25 Segunda Federación

- Cornellà
- Lleida (administrative relegation)

Teams promoted from 2024–25 Lliga Elit

- Can Vidalet
- Vic
- Vilanova

==== Teams and locations ====
Team	City	Home ground
Badalona	Badalona	Municipal de Badalona
Can Vidalet	Esplugues de Llobregat	El Molí
Cerdanyola del Vallès	Cerdanyola del Vallès	Fontetes
Cornellà	Cornellà	Nou Estadi Municipal
Europa B	Barcelona	Nou Sardenya
Grama	Santa Coloma de Gramenet	Can Peixauet
L'Escala	L'Escala	Estadi Municipal
L'Hospitalet	L'Hospitalet de Llobregat	Municipal de l'Hospitalet de Llobregat
Lleida	Lleida	Camp d'Esports
Manresa	Manresa	Nou Congost
Mollerussa	Mollerussa	Camp Municipal
Montañesa	Barcelona	Nou Barris
Peralada	Peralada	Municipal de Peralada
San Cristóbal	Terrassa	Ca n'Anglada
Tona	Tona	Municipal
Vic	Vic	Hipòlit Planàs
Vilanova	Vilanova i la Geltrú	Municipal
Vilassar de Mar	Vilassar de Mar	Xevi Ramón

==== League table ====
Pos	Team	Pld	W	D	L	GF	GA	GD	Pts	Qualification
1	Manresa (C, P)	34	19	9	6	55	32	+23	66	Promotion to Segunda Federación and qualification for Copa del Rey
2	Badalona	34	17	12	5	43	27	+16	63	Qualification for the promotion playoffs
3	Cornellà	34	17	9	8	50	36	+14	60	Qualification for the promotion playoffs
4	Vilanova	34	15	11	8	38	27	+11	56	Qualification for the promotion playoffs
5	L'Hospitalet	34	16	7	11	55	39	+16	55	Qualification for the promotion playoffs
6	Grama	34	14	12	8	49	35	+14	54	
7	L'Escala	34	12	10	12	51	51	0	46 (Note: L’Escala finished ahead of Peralada on head-to-head points: L’Escala 3–0 Peralada, Peralada 2–2 L’Escala)	
8	Peralada	34	11	13	10	45	39	+6	46	
9	Tona	34	10	15	9	35	31	+4	45 (Note: Tona finished ahead of Europa B on overall goal difference)	
10	Europa B	34	12	9	13	44	53	−9	45	
11	Montañesa	34	11	9	14	31	39	−8	42	
12	Mollerussa	34	9	13	12	39	43	−4	40	
13	Vilassar de Mar (Note: Vilassar de Mar awarded a 0–3 win in their Round 1 match against Europa B due to the latter fielding an ineligible player. The match had originally ended 3–1.)	34	9	11	14	36	38	−2	38	
14	San Cristóbal	34	8	13	13	39	48	−9	37	
15	Cerdanyola del Vallès	34	6	16	12	40	53	−13	34	
16	Can Vidalet (R)	34	8	9	17	35	53	−18	33	Relegation to Lliga Elit
17	Vic (R)	34	7	11	16	31	47	−16	32	Relegation to Lliga Elit
18	Lleida (R)	34	4	13	17	21	46	−25	25	Relegation to Lliga Elit

Rules for classification: 1) points; 2) head-to-head points; 3) head-to-head goal difference; 4) goal difference; 5) number of goals scored
(C) Champions; (P) Promoted; (R) Relegated

=== Group 6 – Valencian Community ===
Teams retained from 2024–25 Tercera Federación

- Athletic Torrellano
- Atlético Levante
- Atlético Saguntino
- Atzeneta
- Castellonense
- Crevillente
- Jove Español
- La Nucía
- Ontinyent 1931
- Roda
- Soneja
- Utiel
- Vall de Uxó
- Villarreal C

Teams relegated from 2024–25 Segunda Federación

- Alzira
Location of teams of the 2025–26 Tercera Federación Group 6

Teams promoted from 2024–25 Lliga Comunitat

- Buñol
- Hércules B
- Recambios Colón

==== Teams and locations ====
Team	City	Home ground
Alzira	Alzira	Luis Suñer Picó
Athletic Torrellano	Torrellano, Elche	Municipal
Atlético Levante	Valencia	Ciudad Deportiva de Buñol
Atlético Saguntino	Sagunto	Nou Camp de Morvedre
Atzeneta	Atzeneta d'Albaida	El Regit
Buñol	Buñol	Beltrán Báguena
Castellonense	Castelló	Camp Municipal de L'Almenà
Crevillente	Crevillent	Enrique Miralles
Hércules B	Alicante	Juan Antonio Samaranch
Jove Español	San Vicente del Raspeig	Ciudad Deportiva
La Nucía	La Nucía	Camilo Cano
Ontinyent 1931	Ontinyent	El Clariano
Recambios Colón	Catarroja	Mundial 82
Roda	Villarreal	Pamesa Cerámica
Soneja	Soneja	El Arco
Utiel	Utiel	La Celadilla
Vall de Uxó	La Vall d'Uixó	José Mangriñán
Villarreal C	Villarreal	Pamesa Cerámica

==== League table ====
Pos	Team	Pld	W	D	L	GF	GA	GD	Pts	Qualification
1	Castellonense (C, P)	34	20	7	7	56	30	+26	67	Promotion to Segunda Federación and qualification for Copa del Rey
2	Atlético Saguntino	34	20	6	8	50	30	+20	66	Qualification for the promotion playoffs
3	Atlético Levante	34	18	11	5	54	26	+28	65	Qualification for the promotion playoffs
4	Villarreal C	34	19	6	9	64	36	+28	63	Qualification for the promotion playoffs
5	La Nucía (O, P)	34	16	13	5	44	26	+18	61	Qualification for the promotion playoffs
6	Buñol	34	13	11	10	34	40	−6	50	
7	Vall de Uxó	34	13	10	11	31	29	+2	49	
8	Ontinyent 1931	34	13	9	12	32	30	+2	48	
9	Athletic Torrellano	34	13	8	13	40	38	+2	47	
10	Soneja	34	13	6	15	35	42	−7	45	
11	Hércules B	34	10	11	13	31	46	−15	41	
12	Roda	34	11	7	16	32	45	−13	40	
13	Crevillente	34	9	11	14	44	49	−5	38 (Note: Crevillente finished ahead of Jove Español on overall goal difference)	
14	Jove Español	34	10	8	16	35	44	−9	38	
15	Atzeneta	34	10	7	17	29	40	−11	37	
16	Utiel (Note: Utiel bought the spot left vacant by Castellón B purchasing the berth vacated by Tarazona in 2026–27 Segunda Federación)	34	7	10	17	30	45	−15	31 (Note: Utiel finished ahead of Alzira on overall goal difference)	
17	Alzira (R)	34	7	10	17	32	49	−17	31	Relegation to Lliga Comunitat
18	Recambios Colón (R)	34	2	13	19	27	55	−28	19	Relegation to Lliga Comunitat

Rules for classification: 1) points; 2) head-to-head points; 3) head-to-head goal difference; 4) goal difference; 5) number of goals scored
(C) Champions; (O) Play-off winners; (P) Promoted; (R) Relegated

=== Group 7 – Community of Madrid ===
Teams retained from 2024–25 Tercera Federación

- Alcorcón B
- Atlético Madrid C (Note: Took the place of Collado Villalba.)
- Carabanchel
- Galapagar
- Las Rozas
- Leganés B
- México FC
- Parla
- Torrejón
- Tres Cantos
- Trival Valderas
- Villaverde San Andrés

Teams relegated from 2024–25 Segunda Federación

- Móstoles URJC
- Unión Adarve
Location of teams of the 2025–26 Tercera Federación Group 7

Teams promoted from 2024–25 Primera Autonómica

- Pozuelo de Alarcón
- Racing Madrid
- San Sebastián de los Reyes B
- Siello

==== Teams and locations ====
Team	City	Home ground
Alcorcón B	Alcorcón	Anexo de Santo Domingo
Atlético Madrid C	Majadahonda	Cerro del Espino
Carabanchel	Madrid	La Mina
Galapagar	Galapagar	El Chopo
Las Rozas	Las Rozas	Dehesa de Navalcarbón
Leganés B	Leganés	Instalación Deportiva Butarque
México FC	Paracuellos de Jarama	Municipal
Móstoles URJC	Móstoles	El Soto
Parla	Parla	Los Prados
Pozuelo de Alarcón	Pozuelo de Alarcón	Valle de las Cañas
Racing Madrid	Madrid	David González Rubio
San Sebastián de los Reyes B	San Sebastián de los Reyes	Rafael Delgado Rosa
Siello	Madrid	Orcasitas
Torrejón	Torrejón de Ardoz	Las Veredillas
Tres Cantos	Tres Cantos	La Foresta A
Trival Valderas	Alcorcón	La Canaleja
Unión Adarve	Madrid	Vicente del Bosque
Villaverde San Andrés	Madrid	Boetticher

==== League table ====
Pos	Team	Pld	W	D	L	GF	GA	GD	Pts	Qualification
1	Atlético Madrid C (C, P)	34	18	10	6	83	46	+37	64	Promotion to Segunda Federación
2	Trival Valderas	34	18	6	10	50	36	+14	60 (Note: Trival Valderas finished ahead of Torrejón on overall goal difference)	Qualification for the promotion playoffs and Copa del Rey
3	Torrejón	34	17	9	8	57	46	+11	60	Qualification for the promotion playoffs
4	Las Rozas	34	16	8	10	58	42	+16	56	Qualification for the promotion playoffs
5	Leganés B	34	15	9	10	63	33	+30	54	Qualification for the promotion playoffs
6	Unión Adarve	34	15	8	11	48	42	+6	53	
7	Móstoles URJC	34	14	9	11	51	45	+6	51	
8	San Sebastián de los Reyes B	34	12	13	9	45	35	+10	49	
9	Pozuelo de Alarcón	34	12	12	10	40	33	+7	48	
10	Galapagar	34	11	13	10	42	47	−5	46	
11	México FC	34	12	9	13	45	49	−4	45	
12	Siello	34	13	5	16	39	45	−6	44 (Note: Siello finished ahead of Alcorcón B on head-to-head goal difference: Siello 2–0 Alcorcón B, Alcorcón B 1–0 Siello)	
13	Alcorcón B (R)	34	11	11	12	37	34	+3	44	Relegation to Primera Autonómica
14	Villaverde San Andrés (R)	34	10	13	11	32	44	−12	43	Relegation to Primera Autonómica
15	Carabanchel (R)	34	9	11	14	30	36	−6	38	Relegation to Primera Autonómica
16	Tres Cantos (R)	34	10	3	21	40	65	−25	33	Relegation to Primera Autonómica
17	Parla (R)	34	7	6	21	29	66	−37	27	Relegation to Primera Autonómica
18	Racing Madrid (R)	34	5	7	22	31	76	−45	22	Relegation to Primera Autonómica

Rules for classification: 1) points; 2) head-to-head points; 3) head-to-head goal difference; 4) goal difference; 5) number of goals scored
(C) Champions; (P) Promoted; (R) Relegated

=== Group 8 – Castile and León ===
Teams retained from 2024–25 Tercera Federación

- Almazán
- Arandina
- Atlético Bembibre
- Atlético Mansillés
- Atlético Tordesillas
- Becerril
- Cristo Atlético
- Júpiter Leonés
- La Virgen del Camino
- Mirandés B
- Mojados
- Palencia
- Santa Marta
- Villaralbo

Teams relegated from 2024–25 Segunda Federación

- Guijuelo

Teams promoted from 2024–25 Primera Regional

- Colegios Diocesanos
- Numancia B
- Unionistas B

==== Teams and locations ====
Location of teams of the 2025–26 Tercera Federación Group 8

Team	City	Home ground
Almazán	Almazán	La Arboleda
Arandina	Aranda de Duero	El Montecillo
Atlético Bembibre	Bembibre	La Devesa
Atlético Mansillés	Mansilla de las Mulas	La Caldera
Atlético Tordesillas	Tordesillas	Las Salinas
Becerril	Becerril de Campos	Mariano Haro
Colegios Diocesanos	Ávila	Sancti Spiritu
Cristo Atlético	Palencia	Nueva Balastera
Guijuelo	Guijuelo	Municipal de Guijuelo
Júpiter Leonés	León	Puente Castro
La Virgen del Camino	La Virgen del Camino, Valverde de la Virgen	Los Dominicos
Mirandés B	Miranda de Ebro	Ence
Mojados	Mojados	Campo Municipal
Numancia B	Soria	Francisco Rubio
Palencia	Palencia	Nueva Balastera
Santa Marta	Santa Marta de Tormes	Alfonso San Casto
Unionistas B	Salamanca	Reina Sofía
Villaralbo	Villaralbo	Ciudad Deportiva Fernández Garcia

==== League table ====
Pos	Team	Pld	W	D	L	GF	GA	GD	Pts	Qualification
1	Atlético Tordesillas (C, P)	34	24	6	4	62	24	+38	78	Promotion to Segunda Federación and qualification for Copa del Rey
2	Guijuelo	34	21	7	6	54	26	+28	70	Qualification for the promotion playoffs and Copa del Rey
3	Cristo Atlético	34	21	5	8	48	24	+24	68	Qualification for the promotion playoffs
4	Palencia	34	20	4	10	59	39	+20	64	Qualification for the promotion playoffs
5	Santa Marta	34	18	8	8	53	31	+22	62	Qualification for the promotion playoffs
6	Atlético Mansillés	34	15	12	7	31	27	+4	57	
7	Almazán	34	12	12	10	49	38	+11	48	
8	Mirandés B	34	13	8	13	43	35	+8	47	
9	La Virgen del Camino	34	12	8	14	31	37	−6	44	
10	Villaralbo	34	11	9	14	29	37	−8	42 (Note: Villaralbo finished ahead of Júpiter Leonés on head-to-head points: Villaralbo 0–0 Júpiter Leonés, Júpiter Leonés 1–2 Villaralbo)	
11	Júpiter Leonés	34	12	6	16	38	43	−5	42	
12	Arandina	34	9	10	15	32	46	−14	37	
13	Colegios Diocesanos	34	10	6	18	33	54	−21	36	
14	Atlético Bembibre	34	8	10	16	38	52	−14	34	
15	Unionistas B	34	6	13	15	32	43	−11	31 (Note: Unionistas B finished ahead of Mojados on head-to-head goal difference: Mojados 1–0 Unionistas B, Unionistas B 3–1 Mojados)	
16	Mojados (R)	34	7	10	17	28	55	−27	31	Relegation to Primera Regional
17	Becerril (R)	34	7	8	19	41	60	−19	29	Relegation to Primera Regional
18	Numancia B (R)	34	6	6	22	26	56	−30	24	Relegation to Primera Regional

Rules for classification: 1) points; 2) head-to-head points; 3) head-to-head goal difference; 4) goal difference; 5) number of goals scored
(C) Champions; (P) Promoted; (R) Relegated

=== Group 9 – Eastern Andalusia and Melilla ===
Teams retained from 2024–25 Tercera Federación

- Arenas
- Atlético Mancha Real
- Atlético Porcuna
- Ciudad de Torredonjimeno
- El Palo
- Huétor Tájar
- Huétor Vega
- Marbellí
- Martos
- Mijas-Las Lagunas
- Motril
- Torre del Mar
- Torreperogil

Teams relegated from 2024–25 Segunda Federación

- Recreativo Granada
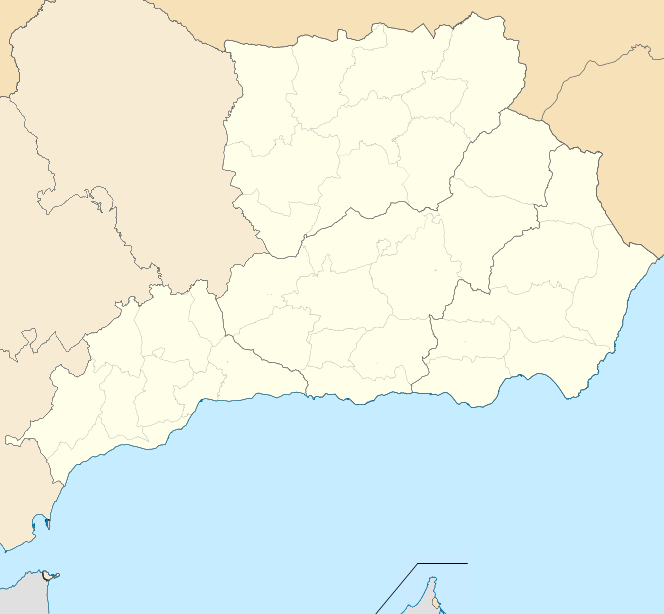
Location of teams of the 2025–26 Tercera Federación Group 9
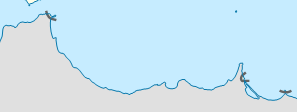
Location of teams of the 2025–26 Tercera División Group 9 – Melilla

Teams promoted from 2024–25 División de Honor

- Alhaurino
- Churriana
- San Pedro

Teams promoted from 2024–25 Primera Autonómica de Melilla

- Melilla B

==== Teams and locations ====
Team	City	Home ground
Alhaurino	Alhaurín El Grande	Miguel Fijones
Arenas	Armilla	Municipal
Atlético Mancha Real	Mancha Real	La Juventud
Atlético Porcuna	Porcuna	San Benito
Churriana	Churriana de la Vega	El Frascuelo
Ciudad de Torredonjimeno	Torredonjimeno	Matías Prats
El Palo	Málaga	San Ignacio
Huétor Tájar	Huétor-Tájar	Miguel Moranto
Huétor Vega	Huétor Vega	Las Viñas
Marbellí	Marbella	Antonio Naranjo
Martos	Martos	Ciudad de Martos
Melilla B	Melilla	La Espiguera
Mijas-Las Lagunas	Las Lagunas, Mijas	Juan Gambero Culebra
Motril	Motril	Escribano Castilla
Recreativo Granada	Granada	Ciudad Deportiva
San Pedro	San Pedro de Alcántara	Municipal
Torre del Mar	Torre del Mar	Juan Manuel Azuaga
Torreperogil	Torreperogil	Abdón Martínez Fariñas

==== League table ====
Pos	Team	Pld	W	D	L	GF	GA	GD	Pts	Qualification
1	Mijas-Las Lagunas (C, P)	34	19	9	6	46	24	+22	66	Promotion to Segunda Federación and qualification for Copa del Rey
2	Motril	34	18	11	5	55	29	+26	65	Qualification for the promotion playoffs
3	Torre del Mar	34	14	13	7	37	26	+11	55	Qualification for the promotion playoffs
4	Arenas	34	15	9	10	38	29	+9	54	Qualification for the promotion playoffs
5	Churriana	34	14	10	10	32	40	−8	52	Qualification for the promotion playoffs
6	Marbellí	34	14	9	11	36	28	+8	51	
7	Ciudad de Torredonjimeno	34	13	11	10	39	38	+1	50	
8	San Pedro	34	12	11	11	37	37	0	47	
9	Atlético Porcuna	34	14	4	16	41	39	+2	46	
10	Huétor Vega	34	12	9	13	43	42	+1	45	
11	Recreativo Granada	34	10	14	10	49	47	+2	44	
12	Alhaurino	34	11	10	13	41	41	0	43	
13	Melilla B (Note: Because Melilla B’s parent club Melilla was relegated from the 2025–26 Segunda Federación, Melilla B was relegated to Primera Autonómica de Melilla) (R)	34	9	12	13	30	32	−2	39	Relegation to Primera Autonómica
14	Atlético Mancha Real	34	9	10	15	30	38	−8	37 (Note: Head-to-head points: Huétor Tájar 5 pts, Atlético Mancha Real 5 pts, Martos 5 pts. Head-to-head goals: Huétor Tájar v Atlético Mancha Real 3–2; Martos v Huétor Tájar 3–2; Atlético Mancha Real v Martos 3–1. Atlético Mancha Real are ahead of Huétor Tájar and Martos on head-to-head goal difference)	
15	Huétor Tájar (R)	34	9	10	15	40	44	−4	37	Relegation to División de Honor
16	Martos (R)	34	9	10	15	32	48	−16	37	Relegation to División de Honor
17	Torreperogil (R)	34	9	7	18	24	43	−19	34	Relegation to División de Honor
18	El Palo (R)	34	6	9	19	28	53	−25	27	Relegation to División de Honor

Rules for classification: 1) points; 2) head-to-head points; 3) head-to-head goal difference; 4) goal difference; 5) number of goals scored
(C) Champions; (P) Promoted; (R) Relegated

=== Group 10 – Western Andalusia and Ceuta ===
Teams retained from 2024–25 Tercera Federación

- Atlético Central
- Atlético Onubense
- Bollullos
- Ceuta B (Note: The non-promotion of Ceuta B prevents the promotion of Sporting de Ceuta, champions of the Regional Preferente de Ceuta.)
- Ciudad de Lucena
- Conil
- Córdoba B
- Coria (Note: Coria CF retained after San Fernando was further relegated to División de Honor due to unpaid debts.)
- Pozoblanco
- San Roque Lepe
- Sevilla C
- Tomares
- Utrera

Teams relegated from 2024–25 Segunda Federación

- Cádiz Mirandilla
- Linense
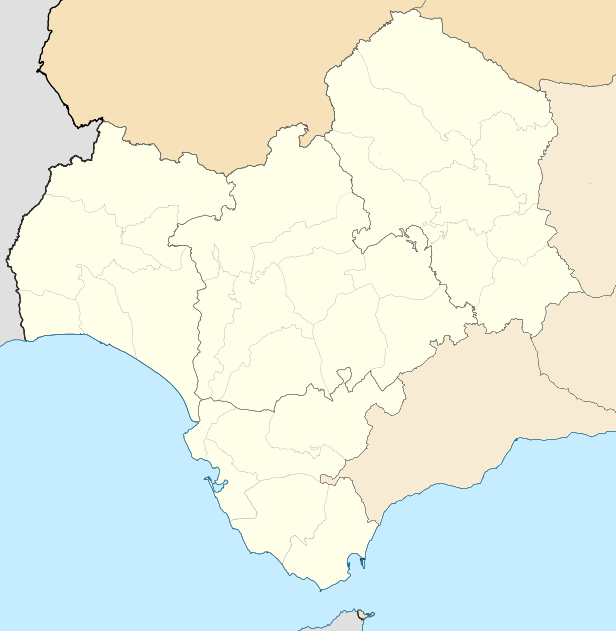
Location of teams of the 2025–26 Tercera Federación Group 10

Teams promoted from 2024–25 División de Honor

- Castilleja
- Chiclana
- Dos Hermanas

==== Teams and locations ====
Team	City	Home ground
Atlético Central	Seville	José Ponce Román
Atlético Onubense	Huelva	Ciudad Deportiva
Bollullos	Bollullos Par del Condado	Eloy Ávila Cano
Cádiz Mirandilla	Cádiz	Ramón Blanco Rodríguez
Castilleja	Castilleja de la Cuesta	Antonio Almendro
Ceuta B	Ceuta	Alfonso Murube
Chiclana	Chiclana de la Frontera	Municipal
Ciudad de Lucena	Lucena	Ciudad de Lucena
Conil	Conil de la Frontera	José Antonio Pérez Ureba
Córdoba B	Córdoba	Rafael Gómez
Coria	Coria del Río	Guadalquivir
Dos Hermanas	Dos Hermanas	Miguel Román García
Linense	La Línea de la Concepción	Municipal de La Línea
Pozoblanco	Pozoblanco	Municipal
San Roque Lepe	Lepe	Ciudad de Lepe
Sevilla C	Seville	José Ramón Cisneros Palacios
Tomares	Tomares	Municipal San Sebastián
Utrera	Utrera	San Juan Bosco

==== League table ====
Pos	Team	Pld	W	D	L	GF	GA	GD	Pts	Qualification
1	Ciudad de Lucena (C, P)	34	22	7	5	69	25	+44	73	Promotion to Segunda Federación and qualification for Copa del Rey
2	Dos Hermanas	34	18	6	10	69	39	+30	60	Qualification for the promotion playoffs
3	Atlético Central (O, P)	34	15	10	9	36	29	+7	55	Qualification for the promotion playoffs
4	Bollullos	34	14	11	9	43	35	+8	53	Qualification for the promotion playoffs
5	Ceuta B	34	14	10	10	38	38	0	52 (Note: Head-to-head points: Ceuta B 14 pts, Linense 11 pts, Cádiz Mirandilla 5 pts, Conil 3 pts)	Qualification for the promotion playoffs
6	Linense	34	13	13	8	45	32	+13	52	
7	Cádiz Mirandilla	34	14	10	10	50	38	+12	52	
8	Conil	34	15	7	12	43	44	−1	52	
9	Córdoba B	34	12	8	14	44	44	0	44 (Note: Córdoba B finished ahead of Utrera on head-to-head points: Córdoba B 2–0 Utrera, Utrera 1–1 Córdoba B)	
10	Utrera	34	12	8	14	40	47	−7	44	
11	Pozoblanco	34	10	13	11	39	44	−5	43 (Note: Head-to-head points: Pozoblanco 6 pts, Chiclana 6 pts, San Roque Lepe 2 pts. Pozoblanco finished ahead of Chiclana on overall goal difference)	
12	Chiclana	34	10	13	11	39	45	−6	43	
13	San Roque Lepe	34	10	13	11	39	39	0	43	
14	Atlético Onubense	34	10	10	14	36	43	−7	40	
15	Tomares	34	10	9	15	34	46	−12	39	
16	Sevilla C (Note: Sevilla C retained after Puente Genil was retained in 2026–27 Segunda Federación.)	34	10	8	16	34	41	−7	38	
17	Castilleja (R)	34	6	9	19	28	62	−34	27	Relegation to División de Honor
18	Coria (R)	34	4	9	21	24	59	−35	21	Relegation to División de Honor

Rules for classification: 1) points; 2) head-to-head points; 3) head-to-head goal difference; 4) goal difference; 5) number of goals scored
(C) Champions; (O) Play-off winners; (P) Promoted; (R) Relegated

=== Group 11 – Balearic Islands ===
Teams retained from 2024–25 Tercera Federación

- Alcúdia
- Binissalem
- Collerense
- Constància
- Felanitx
- Formentera
- Llosetense
- Manacor
- Mercadal
- Platges de Calvià
- Portmany (Note: Retained after taking the place of dissolved Penya Independent.)
- Santanyí

Teams relegated from 2024–25 Segunda Federación

- Mallorca B
- Peña Deportiva

Teams promoted from 2024–25 División de Honor

- Cardassar
- Inter Ibiza
- Rotlet Molinar
- Son Cladera

==== Teams and locations ====
Location of teams of the 2025–26 Tercera Federación Group 11

Team	City	Home ground
Alcúdia	Alcúdia	Els Arcs
Binissalem	Binissalem	Miquel Pons
Cardassar	Sant Llorenç des Cardassar	Es Moleter
Collerense	Es Coll d'en Rabassa, Palma	Ca Na Paulina
Constància	Inca	Municipal
Felanitx	Felanitx	Es Torrentó
Formentera	Sant Francesc Xavier	Municipal
Inter Ibiza	Ibiza	Can Cantó
Llosetense	Lloseta	Municipal
Mallorca B	Palma	Son Bibiloni
Manacor	Manacor	Na Capellera
Mercadal	Es Mercadal	San Martí
Peña Deportiva	Santa Eulària des Riu	Municipal de Santa Eulària
Platges de Calvià	Magaluf, Calvià	Municipal de Magaluf
Portmany	Sant Antoni de Portmany	Sant Antoni
Rotlet Molinar	Palma	Municipal de Rotlet-Molinar
Santanyí	Santanyí	Municipal
Son Cladera	Palma	Municipal

==== League table ====
Pos	Team	Pld	W	D	L	GF	GA	GD	Pts	Qualification
1	Mallorca B (C, P)	34	26	6	2	105	22	+83	84	Promotion to Segunda Federación
2	Manacor	34	24	5	5	71	39	+32	77	Qualification for the promotion playoffs and Copa del Rey
3	Peña Deportiva (O, P)	34	20	8	6	69	30	+39	68	Qualification for the promotion playoffs
4	Constància	34	19	5	10	62	29	+33	62	Qualification for the promotion playoffs
5	Llosetense	34	16	10	8	59	40	+19	58	Qualification for the promotion playoffs
6	Formentera	34	13	13	8	40	29	+11	52	
7	Inter Ibiza	34	15	5	14	42	43	−1	50	
8	Mercadal	34	15	4	15	31	45	−14	49	
9	Cardassar	34	12	8	14	38	55	−17	44	
10	Platges de Calvià	34	12	6	16	41	43	−2	42	
11	Binissalem	34	10	11	13	26	34	−8	41 (Note: Binissalem finished ahead of Santanyí on head-to-head points: Binissalem 1–0 Santanyí, Santanyí 0–1 Binissalem)	
12	Santanyí	34	11	8	15	43	58	−15	41	
13	Alcúdia	34	11	5	18	37	62	−25	38 (Note: Alcùdia finished ahead of Son Cladera on head-to-head points: Alcùdia 1–1 Son Cladera, Son Cladera 0–1 Alcùdia)	
14	Son Cladera (R)	34	11	5	18	41	63	−22	38	Relegation to Regional
15	Portmany (R)	34	8	6	20	25	50	−25	30	Relegation to Regional
16	Collerense (R)	34	6	10	18	41	64	−23	28	Relegation to Regional
17	Felanitx (R)	34	5	11	18	32	62	−30	26	Relegation to Regional
18	Rotlet Molinar (R)	34	5	8	21	34	69	−35	23	Relegation to Regional

Rules for classification: 1) points; 2) head-to-head points; 3) head-to-head goal difference; 4) goal difference; 5) number of goals scored
(C) Champions; (O) Play-off winners; (P) Promoted; (R) Relegated

=== Group 12 – Canary Islands ===
Location of teams of the 2025–26 Tercera Federación Group 12 – Province of Las Palmas
Location of teams of the 2025–26 Tercera Federación Group 12 – Province of Santa Cruz de Tenerife

Teams retained from 2024–25 Tercera Federación

- Arucas
- Herbania
- Lanzarote
- Marino
- Mensajero
- Panadería Pulido
- Real Unión Tenerife (Note: Santa Úrsula merged with Real Unión Tenerife prior to the start of the season.)
- San Bartolomé
- San Fernando
- San Miguel (Note: Retained after the dissolution of UD Ibarra for unpaid debts.)
- Tamaraceite
- Villa de Santa Brígida

Teams relegated from 2024–25 Segunda Federación

- Atlético Paso
- Unión Sur Yaiza

Teams promoted from 2024–25 Interinsular Preferente

- Las Palmas C
- Telde
- Tenerife C
- Tenisca

==== Teams and locations ====
Team	City	Home ground
Arucas	Arucas	Tonono
Atlético Paso	El Paso	Municipal El Paso
Herbania	Puerto del Rosario	Municipal de Los Pozos
Lanzarote	Arrecife	Ciudad Deportiva
Las Palmas C	Las Palmas	Anexo Gran Canaria
Marino	Los Cristianos, Arona	Antonio Domínguez Alfonso
Mensajero	Santa Cruz de La Palma	Silvestre Carillo
Panadería Pulido	Vega de San Mateo	San Mateo
Real Unión Tenerife	Santa Cruz de Tenerife	Municipal de la Salud
San Bartolomé	San Bartolomé	Municipal Pedro Espinosa de León
San Fernando	Maspalomas	Ciudad Deportiva
San Miguel	San Miguel de Abona	Paco Tejera
Tamaraceite	Las Palmas	Juan Guedes
Telde	Telde	Pablo Hernández
Tenerife C	Santa Cruz de Tenerife	Centro Insular
Tenisca	Santa Cruz de La Palma	Virgen de las Nieves
Unión Sur Yaiza	Yaiza	Municipal
Villa de Santa Brígida	Santa Brígida	El Guiniguada

==== League table ====
Pos	Team	Pld	W	D	L	GF	GA	GD	Pts	Qualification
1	Atlético Paso (C, P)	34	18	13	3	51	19	+32	67	Promotion to Segunda Federación and qualification for Copa del Rey
2	San Fernando	34	19	9	6	49	23	+26	66	Qualification for the promotion playoffs
3	Mensajero	34	18	9	7	51	31	+20	63 (Note: Mensajero finished ahead of Tamaraceite on head-to-head points: Tamaraceite 3–3 Mensajero, Mensajero 2–1 Tamaraceite)	Qualification for the promotion playoffs
4	Tamaraceite (O, P)	34	19	6	9	56	36	+20	63	Qualification for the promotion playoffs
5	Panadería Pulido	34	15	10	9	47	33	+14	55	Qualification for the promotion playoffs
6	Las Palmas C	34	15	9	10	58	42	+16	54	
7	Tenerife C	34	14	10	10	49	46	+3	52	
8	Villa Santa Brígida	34	15	5	14	42	35	+7	50	
9	Lanzarote	34	12	12	10	45	36	+9	48	
10	Real Unión Tenerife	34	12	9	13	34	32	+2	45	
11	San Miguel	34	10	9	15	37	42	−5	39 (Note: San Miguel finished ahead of Marino on head-to-head points: Marino 1–2 San Miguel, San Miguel 2–0 Marino)	
12	Marino	34	8	15	11	44	40	+4	39	
13	Unión Sur Yaiza	34	10	8	16	33	43	−10	38	
14	San Bartolomé	34	8	12	14	30	55	−25	36	
15	Arucas (R)	34	7	12	15	30	47	−17	33	Relegation to Interinsular Preferente
16	Herbania (R)	34	7	11	16	39	58	−19	32	Relegation to Interinsular Preferente
17	Tenisca (R)	34	6	7	21	32	68	−36	25 (Note: Tenisca finished ahead of Telde on overall goal difference)	Relegation to Interinsular Preferente
18	Telde (R)	34	5	10	19	30	71	−41	25	Relegation to Interinsular Preferente

Rules for classification: 1) points; 2) head-to-head points; 3) head-to-head goal difference; 4) goal difference; 5) number of goals scored
(C) Champions; (O) Play-off winners; (P) Promoted; (R) Relegated

=== Group 13 – Region of Murcia ===
Teams retained from 2024–25 Tercera Federación

- Águilas B
- Atlético Pulpileño
- Bala Azul
- Caravaca
- Cartagena B
- Cieza
- Deportivo Marítimo
- El Palmar
- Minerva
- Muleño
- Murcia Imperial
- Santomera
- UCAM Murcia B
- Unión Molinense
Location of teams of the 2025–26 Tercera Federación Group 13

Teams promoted from 2024–25 Preferente Autonómica

- Atlético Santa Cruz
- Mazarrón
- Olímpico Totana
- Yeclano B

==== Teams and locations ====
Team	City	Home ground
Águilas B	Águilas	El Rubial
Atlético Pulpileño	Pulpí (Andalusia)	San Miguel
Atlético Santa Cruz	Murcia	La Peñeta
Bala Azul	Mazarrón	Playa Sol
Caravaca	Caravaca de la Cruz	El Morao
Cartagena B	Cartagena	Ciudad Jardín
Cieza	Cieza	La Arboleja
Deportivo Marítimo	Cartagena	Mundial 82
El Palmar	El Palmar, Murcia	Municipal
Mazarrón	Mazarrón	Municipal
Minerva	Alumbres, Cartagena	El Secante
Muleño	Mula	Municipal
Murcia Imperial	Murcia	Campus de Espinardo
Olímpico Totana	Totana	Juan Cayuela
Santomera	Santomera	El Limonar
UCAM Murcia B	Sangonera la Verde	El Mayayo
Unión Molinense	Molina de Segura	Sánchez Cánovas
Yeclano B	Yecla	Juan Palao Azorín

==== League table ====
Pos	Team	Pld	W	D	L	GF	GA	GD	Pts	Qualification
1	Cieza (C, P)	34	21	10	3	65	21	+44	73	Promotion to Segunda Federación and qualification for Copa del Rey
2	Murcia Imperial (O, P)	34	17	8	9	59	44	+15	59 (Note: Murcia Imperial finished ahead of Unión Molinense on head-to-head goal difference: Unión Molinense 0–3 Murcia Imperial, Murcia Imperial 0–2 Unión Molinense)	Qualification for the promotion playoffs
3	Unión Molinense	34	17	8	9	46	34	+12	59	Qualification for the promotion playoffs
4	Olímpico Totana	34	15	13	6	44	27	+17	58	Qualification for the promotion playoffs
5	Mazarrón	34	14	14	6	50	33	+17	56	Qualification for the promotion playoffs
6	UCAM Murcia B	34	13	16	5	55	37	+18	55	
7	Águilas B	34	14	10	10	47	42	+5	52	
8	Atlético Santa Cruz	34	15	6	13	37	34	+3	51	
9	Atlético Pulpileño	34	13	11	10	30	29	+1	50	
10	Minerva	34	11	11	12	28	39	−11	44	
11	Bala Azul	34	8	16	10	39	36	+3	40	
12	Cartagena B	34	9	11	14	40	39	+1	38	
13	Deportivo Marítimo	34	9	9	16	38	46	−8	36	
14	El Palmar	34	8	8	18	27	48	−21	32 (Note: El Palmar finished ahead of Santomera on head-to-head points: El Palmar 2–2 Santomera, Santomera 0–1 El Palmar)	
15	Santomera	34	8	8	18	38	64	−26	32	
16	Caravaca (R)	34	6	13	15	33	44	−11	31 (Note: Caravaca finished ahead of Muleño on head-to-head points: Caravaca 2–0 Muleño, Muleño 1–1)	Relegation to Preferente Autonómica
17	Muleño (R)	34	6	13	15	33	58	−25	31	Relegation to Preferente Autonómica
18	Yeclano B (R)	34	5	9	20	22	56	−34	24	Relegation to Preferente Autonómica

Rules for classification: 1) points; 2) head-to-head points; 3) head-to-head goal difference; 4) goal difference; 5) number of goals scored
(C) Champions; (O) Play-off winners; (P) Promoted; (R) Relegated

=== Group 14 – Extremadura ===
Teams retained from 2024–25 Tercera Federación

- Atlético Pueblonuevo
- Azuaga
- Badajoz
- Calamonte
- Diocesano
- Jaraíz
- Jerez
- Llerenense
- Montijo
- Moralo
- Puebla de la Calzada
- Santa Amalia
- Villafranca

Teams relegated from 2024–25 Segunda Federación

- Don Benito
- Villanovense
Location of teams of the 2025–26 Tercera Federación Group 14

Teams promoted from 2024–25 Primera División Extremeña

- Cabeza del Buey
- Gévora
- Montehermoso

==== Teams and locations ====
Team	City	Home ground
Atlético Pueblonuevo	Pueblonuevo del Guadiana	Antonio Amaya
Azuaga	Azuaga	Municipal
Badajoz	Badajoz	Nuevo Vivero
Cabeza del Buey	Cabeza del Buey	Municipal
Calamonte	Calamonte	Municipal
Diocesano	Cáceres	Campos de La Federación
Don Benito	Don Benito	Vicente Sanz
Gévora	Gévora, Badajoz	Municipal
Jaraíz	Jaraíz de la Vera	Municipal
Jerez	Jerez de los Caballeros	Manuel Calzado Galván
Llerenense	Llerena	Fernando Robina
Montehermoso	Montehermoso	Municipal
Montijo	Montijo	Municipal
Moralo	Navalmoral de la Mata	Municipal
Puebla de la Calzada	Puebla de la Calzada	Municipal
Santa Amalia	Santa Amalia	Municipal
Villafranca	Villafranca de los Barros	Municipal
Villanovense	Villanueva de la Serena	Romero Cuerda

==== League table ====
Pos	Team	Pld	W	D	L	GF	GA	GD	Pts	Qualification
1	Don Benito (C, P)	34	21	8	5	70	22	+48	71 (Note: Don Benito finished ahead of Badajoz on head-to-head points: Badajoz 0–1 Don Benito, Don Benito 1–1 Badajoz)	Promotion to Segunda Federación and qualification for Copa del Rey
2	Badajoz (Note: Azuaga awarded a 0–3 win in their Round 1 match against Badajoz after the latter did not take the pitch due to being unable to field a team. Badajoz were subsequently deducted three points.) (O, P)	34	23	5	6	64	27	+37	71	Qualification for the promotion playoffs and Copa del Rey
3	Moralo	34	17	11	6	54	32	+22	62 (Note: Moralo finished ahead of Azuaga on head-to-head points: Azuaga 1–2 Moralo, Moralo 1–1 Azuaga)	Qualification for the promotion playoffs
4	Azuaga	34	18	8	8	53	31	+22	62	Qualification for the promotion playoffs
5	Jaraíz	34	16	11	7	53	33	+20	59	Qualification for the promotion playoffs
6	Cabeza del Buey	34	15	12	7	45	29	+16	57	
7	Villafranca	34	16	7	11	48	41	+7	55	
8	Villanovense	34	15	8	11	42	35	+7	53	
9	Montijo	34	13	7	14	43	42	+1	46	
10	Jerez	34	8	17	9	56	51	+5	41 (Note: Jerez finished ahead of Llerenense on head-to-head points: Jerez 4–1 Llerenense, Llerenense 1–1 Jerez)	
11	Llerenense	34	11	8	15	35	44	−9	41	
12	Puebla de la Calzada	34	9	11	14	35	48	−13	38	
13	Santa Amalia	34	9	7	18	30	52	−22	34	
14	Gévora	34	8	9	17	32	53	−21	33 (Note: Gévora finished ahead of Atlético Pueblonuevo on overall goal difference)	
15	Atlético Pueblonuevo	34	9	6	19	29	55	−26	33	
16	Diocesano (R)	34	6	12	16	33	63	−30	30	Relegation to Primera División Extremeña
17	Montehermoso (R)	34	5	8	21	24	66	−42	23	Relegation to Primera División Extremeña
18	Calamonte (R)	34	3	13	18	25	47	−22	22	Relegation to Primera División Extremeña

Rules for classification: 1) points; 2) head-to-head points; 3) head-to-head goal difference; 4) goal difference; 5) number of goals scored
(C) Champions; (O) Play-off winners; (P) Promoted; (R) Relegated

=== Group 15 – Navarre ===
Location of teams of the 2025–26 Tercera Federación Group 15
Location of teams of the 2025–26 Tercera Federación Group 15 (Cuenca de Pamplona)

Teams retained from 2024–25 Tercera Federación

- Ardoi
- Atlético Artajonés
- Beti Kozkor
- Beti Onak
- Bidezarra
- Cirbonero
- Cortes
- Huarte
- Pamplona
- Peña Sport
- San Juan
- Txantrea
- Valle de Egüés

Teams relegated from 2024–25 Segunda Federación

- Izarra
- Subiza

Teams promoted from 2024–25 Primera Autonómica

- Aoiz
- Avance
- Oberena

==== Teams and locations ====
Team	City	Home ground
Aoiz	Agoitz	San Miguel
Ardoi	Zizur Mayor	El Pinar
Atlético Artajonés	Artajona	La Alameda
Avance	Ezcabarte	Igueldea
Beti Kozkor	Lekunberri	Plazaola
Beti Onak	Villava	Lorenzo Goikoa
Bidezarra	Noáin	Municipal El Soto
Cirbonero	Cintruénigo	San Juan
Cortes	Cortes	San Francisco Javier
Huarte	Huarte/Uharte	Areta
Izarra	Estella-Lizarra	Merkatondoa
Oberena	Pamplona	Oberena
Pamplona	Pamplona	Bidezarra
Peña Sport	Tafalla	San Francisco
San Juan	Pamplona	San Juan
Subiza	Subiza	Sotoburu
Txantrea	Pamplona	Txantrea
Valle de Egüés	Egüés	Sarriguren

==== League table ====
Pos	Team	Pld	W	D	L	GF	GA	GD	Pts	Qualification
1	Peña Sport (C, P)	34	24	5	5	65	39	+26	77	Promotion to Segunda Federación and qualification for Copa del Rey
2	Pamplona	34	22	8	4	65	28	+37	74	Qualification for the promotion playoffs and Copa del Rey
3	Izarra	34	16	13	5	64	31	+33	61	Qualification for the promotion playoffs
4	Subiza	34	15	9	10	46	31	+15	54	Qualification for the promotion playoffs
5	San Juan	34	12	16	6	43	28	+15	52	Qualification for the promotion playoffs
6	Huarte	34	15	2	17	49	47	+2	47	
7	Beti Kozkor	34	12	10	12	50	43	+7	46	
8	Avance	34	12	9	13	47	49	−2	45	
9	Cortes	34	13	5	16	37	51	−14	44	
10	Cirbonero	34	11	10	13	38	42	−4	43 (Note: Cirbonero finished ahead of Txantrea on head-to-head points: Txantrea 1–1 Cirbonero, Cirbonero 1–0 Txantrea)	
11	Txantrea	34	12	7	15	52	67	−15	43	
12	Valle de Egüés	34	11	9	14	48	57	−9	42	
13	Bidezarra	34	10	9	15	34	40	−6	39	
14	Aoiz	34	9	9	16	41	49	−8	36 (Note: Head-to-head points: Aoiz 8 pts, Beti Onak 5 pts, Ardoi 2 pts)	
15	Beti Onak	34	9	9	16	42	55	−13	36	
16	Ardoi (R)	34	8	12	14	46	56	−10	36	Relegation to Primera Autonómica
17	Oberena (R)	34	7	10	17	32	61	−29	31 (Note: Oberena finished ahead of Atlético Artajonés on head-to-head points: Oberena 2–1 Atlético Artajonés, Atlético Artajonés 1–1 Oberena)	Relegation to Primera Autonómica
18	Atlético Artajonés (R)	34	7	10	17	36	61	−25	31	Relegation to Primera Autonómica

Rules for classification: 1) points; 2) head-to-head points; 3) head-to-head goal difference; 4) goal difference; 5) number of goals scored
(C) Champions; (P) Promoted; (R) Relegated

=== Group 16 – La Rioja ===
Location of teams of the 2025–26 Tercera Federación Group 16
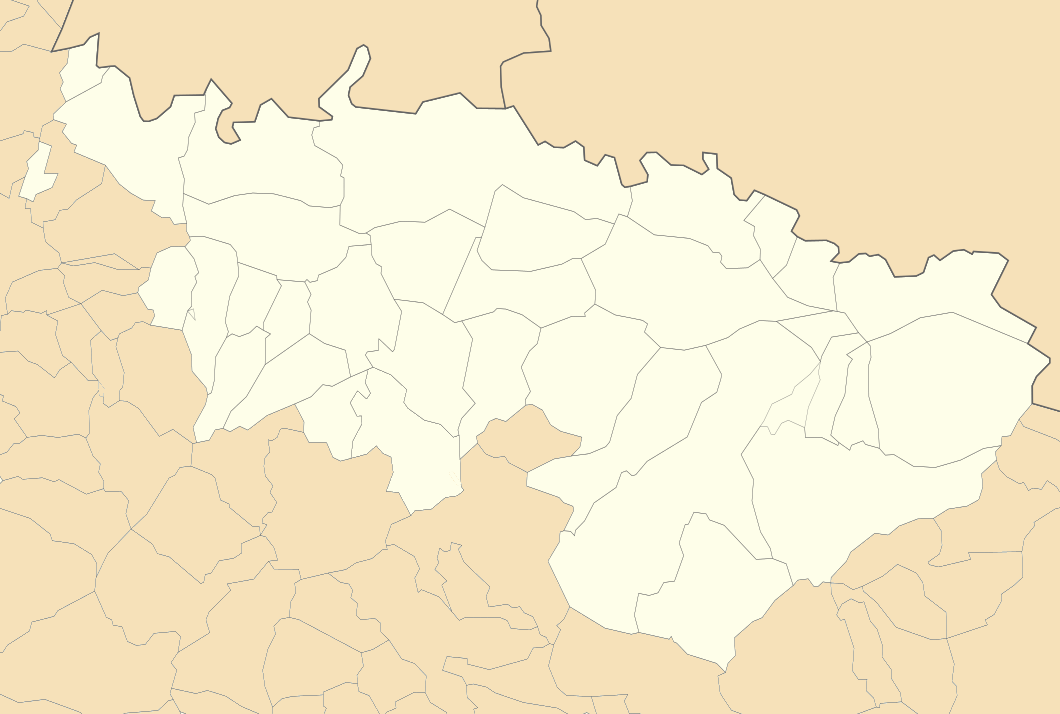
Location of teams of the 2025–26 Tercera Federación Group 16 – Comarca de Logroño

Teams retained from 2024–25 Tercera Federación

- Agoncillo
- Arnedo
- Atlético Vianés
- Autol
- Berceo
- Comillas
- Haro
- La Calzada
- UD Logroñés B
- Oyonesa
- Peña Balsamaiso
- Varea
- Yagüe

Teams relegated from 2024–25 Segunda Federación

- Anguiano
- Calahorra

Teams promoted from 2024–25 Regional Preferente

- Pradejón
- San Marcial
- Villegas

==== Teams and locations ====
Team	City	Home ground
Agoncillo	Agoncillo	San Roque
Anguiano	Anguiano	Isla
Arnedo	Arnedo	Sendero
Atlético Vianés	Viana (Navarre)	Municipal
Autol	Autol	La Manzanera
Berceo	Logroño	La Isla
Calahorra	Calahorra	La Planilla
Comillas	Logroño	Mundial 82
Haro	Haro	El Mazo
La Calzada	Santo Domingo de La Calzada	El Rollo
Logroñés B	Logroño	Mundial 82
Oyonesa	Oyón (Basque Country)	El Espinar
Peña Balsamaiso	Logroño	La Estrella
Pradejón	Pradejón	Municipal
San Marcial	Lardero	Ángel de Vicente
Varea	Varea, Logroño	Municipal
Villegas	Logroño	La Ribera
Yagüe	Logroño	El Salvador

==== League table ====
Pos	Team	Pld	W	D	L	GF	GA	GD	Pts	Qualification
1	UD Logroñés B (C, P)	34	26	8	0	99	22	+77	86	Promotion to Segunda Federación
2	Varea	34	22	7	5	51	25	+26	73	Qualification for the promotion playoffs and Copa del Rey
3	Arnedo (O, P)	34	21	9	4	72	26	+46	72	Qualification for the promotion playoffs
4	Calahorra	34	17	12	5	86	26	+60	63	Qualification for the promotion playoffs
5	Oyonesa	34	18	7	9	54	41	+13	61	Qualification for the promotion playoffs
6	Anguiano	34	17	9	8	49	36	+13	60	
7	Haro	34	14	9	11	54	46	+8	51	
8	Agoncillo	34	13	8	13	59	49	+10	47	
9	Atlético Vianés	34	11	9	14	39	51	−12	42	
10	Yagüe	34	9	13	12	48	52	−4	40	
11	San Marcial	34	10	9	15	39	59	−20	39 (Note: San Marcial finished ahead of Berceo on head-to-head points: Berceo 2–3 San Marcial, San Marcial 1–1 Berceo)	
12	Berceo	34	10	9	15	42	50	−8	39	
13	La Calzada	34	10	8	16	40	55	−15	38 (Note: La Calzada finished ahead of Comillas on head-to-head points: Comillas 0–2 La Calzada, La Calzada 1–0 Comillas)	
14	Comillas	34	11	5	18	32	58	−26	38	
15	Pradejón	34	9	8	17	30	49	−19	35	
16	Villegas (R)	34	7	7	20	36	66	−30	28	Relegation to Regional Preferente
17	Autol (R)	34	4	6	24	20	80	−60	18	Relegation to Regional Preferente
18	Peña Balsamaiso (R)	34	0	11	23	27	86	−59	11	Relegation to Regional Preferente

Rules for classification: 1) points; 2) head-to-head points; 3) head-to-head goal difference; 4) goal difference; 5) number of goals scored
(C) Champions; (O) Play-off winners; (P) Promoted; (R) Relegated

=== Group 17 – Aragon ===
Location of teams of the 2025–26 Tercera Federación Group 17

Teams retained from 2024–25 Tercera Federación

- Almudévar
- Andorra
- Atlético Monzón
- Belchite 97
- Binéfar
- Calamocha
- Caspe
- Cuarte
- Épila
- Huesca B
- La Almunia
- Tamarite
- Utrillas
- Zuera

Teams promoted from 2024–25 Regional Preferente

- Cariñena
- Casetas
- Illueca
- Robres

==== Teams and locations ====
Team	City	Home ground
Almudévar	Almudévar	La Corona
Andorra	Andorra	Juan Antonio Endeiza
Atlético Monzón	Monzón	Isidro Calderón
Belchite 97	Belchite	Municipal
Binéfar	Binéfar	Los Olmos
Calamocha	Calamocha	Jumaya
Cariñena	Cariñena	La Platera
Casetas	Zaragoza	San Miguel
Caspe	Caspe	Los Rosales
Cuarte	Cuarte de Huerva	Nuevo Municipal
Épila	Épila	La Huerta
Huesca B	Huesca	San Jorge
Illueca	Illueca	Papa Luna
La Almunia	La Almunia de Doña Godina	Tenerías
Robres	Robres	San Blas
Tamarite	Tamarite de Litera	La Colomina
Utrillas	Utrillas	La Vega
Zuera	Zuera	José Guzmán

==== League table ====
Pos	Team	Pld	W	D	L	GF	GA	GD	Pts	Qualification
1	Calamocha (C, P)	34	23	6	5	49	22	+27	75	Promotion to Segunda Federación and qualification for Copa del Rey
2	Cuarte	34	20	14	0	43	12	+31	74	Qualification for the promotion playoffs and Copa del Rey
3	Atlético Monzón	34	23	4	7	73	37	+36	73	Qualification for the promotion playoffs
4	Épila	34	19	10	5	39	20	+19	67	Qualification for the promotion playoffs
5	Caspe	34	13	14	7	38	26	+12	53	Qualification for the promotion playoffs
6	Huesca B	34	14	10	10	52	33	+19	52	
7	Binéfar	34	14	6	14	58	47	+11	48	
8	La Almunia	34	11	14	9	42	38	+4	47	
9	Almudévar	34	12	8	14	34	39	−5	44	
10	Tamarite	34	10	11	13	41	47	−6	41	
11	Andorra	34	10	9	15	35	45	−10	39	
12	Illueca	34	9	11	14	35	51	−16	38	
13	Robres	34	10	6	18	38	49	−11	36	
14	Belchite 97	34	7	11	16	28	43	−15	32	
15	Cariñena	34	5	16	13	35	46	−11	31	
16	Casetas (R)	34	6	12	16	40	56	−16	30	Relegation to Regional Preferente
17	Utrillas (R)	34	5	14	15	36	57	−21	29	Relegation to Regional Preferente
18	Zuera (R)	34	2	10	22	17	65	−48	16	Relegation to Regional Preferente

Rules for classification: 1) points; 2) head-to-head points; 3) head-to-head goal difference; 4) goal difference; 5) number of goals scored
(C) Champions; (P) Promoted; (R) Relegated

=== Group 18 – Castilla–La Mancha ===
Teams retained from 2024–25 Tercera Federación

- Atlético Albacete
- Azuqueca
- Calvo Sotelo
- Cazalegas
- Huracán Balazote
- Manchego
- Marchamalo
- Pedroñeras
- Tarancón
- Toledo
- Villacañas
- Villarrobledo
- Villarrubia

Teams relegated from 2024–25 Segunda Federación

- Illescas
Location of teams of the 2025–26 Tercera Federación Group 18

Teams promoted from 2024–25 Primera Autonómica Preferente

- Guadalajara B
- La Solana
- San Clemente
- Sonseca

==== Teams and locations ====
Team	City	Home ground
Atlético Albacete	Albacete	Andrés Iniesta
Azuqueca	Azuqueca de Henares	San Miguel
Calvo Sotelo	Puertollano	Ciudad de Puertollano
Cazalegas	Cazalegas	Ciudad Deportiva Ébora Formación
Guadalajara B	Guadalajara	Fuente de la Niña
Huracán Balazote	Balazote	Municipal de Barrax
Illescas	Illescas	Municipal
La Solana	La Solana	La Moheda
Manchego	Ciudad Real	Juan Carlos I
Marchamalo	Marchamalo	La Solana
Pedroñeras	Las Pedroñeras	Municipal
San Clemente	San Clemente	Municipal
Sonseca	Sonseca	Martín Juanes
Tarancón	Tarancón	Municipal
Toledo	Toledo	Salto del Caballo
Villacañas	Villacañas	Las Pirámides
Villarrobledo	Villarrobledo	Nuestra Señora de la Caridad
Villarrubia	Villarrubia de los Ojos	Nuevo Municipal

==== League table ====
Pos	Team	Pld	W	D	L	GF	GA	GD	Pts	Qualification
1	Calvo Sotelo (C, P)	34	22	8	4	54	21	+33	74	Promotion to Segunda Federación and qualification for Copa del Rey
2	Tarancón	34	22	7	5	62	25	+37	73	Qualification for the promotion playoffs and Copa del Rey
3	Toledo	34	19	11	4	55	17	+38	68	Qualification for the promotion playoffs
4	Atlético Albacete (O, P)	34	17	13	4	49	17	+32	64	Qualification for the promotion playoffs
5	Manchego	34	18	7	9	52	29	+23	61	Qualification for the promotion playoffs
6	Villarrubia	34	15	8	11	42	35	+7	53	
7	Villacañas	34	12	12	10	29	26	+3	48	
8	San Clemente	34	12	11	11	36	44	−8	47	
9	Guadalajara B	34	11	10	13	30	37	−7	43 (Note: Guadalajara B finished ahead of Villarrobledo on head-to-head points: Villarrobledo 1–1 Guadalajara B, Guadalajara B 3–1 Villarrobledo)	
10	Villarrobledo	34	10	13	11	30	36	−6	43	
11	Huracán Balazote	34	12	5	17	33	45	−12	41	
12	Illescas	34	8	13	13	21	32	−11	37 (Note: Illescas finished ahead of Marchamalo on head-to-head points: Marchamalo 0–1 Illescas, Illescas 2–1 Marchamalo)	
13	Marchamalo	34	10	7	17	38	47	−9	37	
14	La Solana	34	8	11	15	26	38	−12	35	
15	Azuqueca (R)	34	7	13	14	34	39	−5	34	Relegation to Primera Autonómica Preferente
16	Pedroñeras (R)	34	7	12	15	28	43	−15	33	Relegation to Primera Autonómica Preferente
17	Sonseca (R)	34	5	7	22	28	69	−41	22	Relegation to Primera Autonómica Preferente
18	Cazalegas (R)	34	4	6	24	17	64	−47	18	Relegation to Primera Autonómica Preferente

Rules for classification: 1) points; 2) head-to-head points; 3) head-to-head goal difference; 4) goal difference; 5) number of goals scored
(C) Champions; (O) Play-off winners; (P) Promoted; (R) Relegated

== Qualification for Copa del Rey ==
In addition to the 18 best-placed non-reserve teams qualifying for the 2026–27 Copa del Rey, the seven best non-reserve runners-up of the 18 groups that have not already qualified will also participate.

In addition, the seven following teams will qualify for the next Copa Federación de España

Pos	Grp	Team	Pld	W	D	L	GF	GA	GD	Pts	Qualification or relegation
1	2	Covadonga	34	25	5	4	88	24	+64	80	Qualification for Copa del Rey
2	15	Pamplona	34	22	8	4	65	28	+37	74	Qualification for Copa del Rey
3	17	Cuarte	34	20	14	0	43	12	+31	74	Qualification for Copa del Rey
4	18	Tarancón	34	22	7	5	62	25	+37	73	Qualification for Copa del Rey
5	14	Badajoz	34	23	5	6	64	27	+37	71	Qualification for Copa del Rey
6	3	Laredo	34	21	8	5	63	28	+35	71	Qualification for Copa del Rey
7	8	Guijuelo	34	21	7	6	54	26	+28	70	Qualification for Copa del Rey
8	1	Compostela	34	19	11	4	55	28	+27	68	Qualification for Copa Federación
9	12	San Fernando	34	19	9	6	49	23	+26	66	Qualification for Copa Federación
10	6	Atlético Saguntino	34	20	6	8	50	30	+20	66	Qualification for Copa Federación
11	9	Motril	34	18	11	5	55	29	+26	65	Qualification for Copa Federación
12	5	Badalona	34	17	12	5	43	27	+16	63	Qualification for Copa Federación
13	4	Leioa	34	18	7	9	50	34	+16	61	Qualification for Copa Federación
14	10	Dos Hermanas	34	18	6	10	69	39	+30	60	Qualification for Copa Federación
15	11	Manacor	34	24	5	5	71	39	+32	77	Second-place team already qualified
16	16	Varea	34	22	7	5	51	25	+26	73	Second-place team already qualified
17	7	Trival Valderas	34	18	6	10	50	36	+14	60	Second-place team already qualified
18	13	Murcia Imperial	34	17	8	9	59	44	+15	59	Ineligible for Copa del Rey

Rules for classification: 1) points; 2) goal difference; 3) number of goals scored

== See also ==
- 2025–26 La Liga
- 2025–26 Segunda División
- 2025–26 Primera Federación
- 2025–26 Segunda Federación
