= Álvaro Muñiz =

Spanish footballer

Personal information
- Full name: Álvaro Muñiz Cegarra
- Date of birth: 7 September 1988 (age 38)
- Place of birth: Gijón, Spain
- Height: 1.82 m (6 ft 0 in)
- Position: Midfielder

Team information
- Current team: Caravaca

Senior career*
Years	Team	Apps	(Gls)
- Caravaca
2011–2012	La Unión	20	(11)
2012	Burgos	7	(0)
2012–2013	Mar Menor		
2013–2014	Marino de Luanco	33	(8)
2014–2015	Lorca FC	18	(1)
2015	Pontevedra		
2015–2017	Lealtad	69	(4)
2017–2018	Formentera	17	(0)
2018	Ibiza		
2018–2019	Internacional de Madrid	21	(1)
2019–2020	Inter Turku	44	(0)
2021	Langreo	12	(2)
2021–2022	Badalona	9	(0)
2022	Hibernians	10	(0)
2022–2023	Melilla	32	(1)
2023–2024	La Unión Atlético	12	(0)
2024–2025	Real Jaén	53	(4)
2025–	Caravaca	3	(0)
- * Club domestic league appearances and goals as of 21 September 2025

Álvaro Muñiz Cegarra (born 7 September 1988) is a Spanish professional footballer who plays for Tercera Federación club Caravaca as a midfielder.
