= CD Montañas del Pas =

Association football club in Spain

Montañas del Pas
- Full name: Club Deportivo Montañas del Pas
- Founded: 2008
- Ground: Municipal de San Vicente de Toranzo, Corvera de Toranzo, Cantabria, Spain
- Capacity: 300
- President: Emilio Rodríguez
- Manager: Pablo Cervera Molleda
- League: Regional Preferente
- 2025–26: Tercera Federación – Group 3, 17th of 18 (relegated)
Home colours	Away colours

Club Deportivo Montañas del Pas is a Spanish football team based in Corvera de Toranzo, in the autonomous community of Cantabria. Founded in 2008, they play in Regional Preferente, holding home games at Campo de Fútbol Municipal de San Vicente de Toranzo, which has a capacity of 300 spectators.

== History ==
Founded in 2008, Montañas del Pas immediately began playing in the Segunda Regional, and achieved promotion to the Primera Regional in 2010. Another promotion to the Regional Preferente followed in 2010, but the club suffered immediate relegation, and dropped down another division in 2016.

Back in Primera Regional in 2018, Montañas del Pas suffered relegation in 2022 but later achieved two consecutive promotions to reach the Preferente in 2024, after an 11-year absence. On 18 May 2025, the club achieved a first-ever promotion to the Tercera Federación, after finishing fourth in the Preferente.

== Season to season ==
Season	Tier	Division	Place	Copa del Rey
2008–09	7	2ª Reg.	5th	
2009–10	7	2ª Reg.	1st	
2010–11	6	1ª Reg.	5th	
2011–12	6	1ª Reg.	1st	
2012–13	5	Reg. Pref.	18th	
2013–14	6	1ª Reg.	13th	
2014–15	6	1ª Reg.	11th	
2015–16	6	1ª Reg.	16th	
2016–17	7	2ª Reg.	7th	
2017–18	7	2ª Reg.	6th	
2018–19	6	1ª Reg.	12th	
2019–20	6	1ª Reg.	8th	
2020–21	6	1ª Reg.	4th	
2021–22	7	1ª Reg.	14th	
2022–23	8	2ª Reg.	2nd	
2023–24	7	1ª Reg.	6th	
2024–25	6	Reg. Pref.	4th	
2025–26	5	3ª Fed.	17th	
2026–27	6	Reg. Pref.		

- 1 season in Tercera Federación

== Current squad ==
As of 27 September 2026

Note: Flags indicate national team as defined under FIFA eligibility rules; some limited exceptions apply. Players may hold more than one non-FIFA nationality.

No.	Pos.	Nation	Player
1	GK	ESP	Javier Reventun Crespo
25	GK	ESP	Paul Pazos Galarza
8	DF	ESP	Eliseo Fernández Sámano
21	DF	ESP	Manuel Campo Iturbe
2	DF	ESP	Guillermo Velarde Martinez
19	DF	ESP	Alejandro Puente Bustillo
16	DF	ESP	Jairo Fernández Ortiz
14	MF	ESP	Pablo Ruiz Ruisanchez
5	MF	ESP	Adrián Cobo Arroyo
10	MF	ESP	José Julián Gómez García
9	MF	ESP	Borja Antolín Torre

No.	Pos.	Nation	Player
4	MF	ESP	Diego Campo Penagos
7	MF	ESP	Víctor Revuelta Estrada
15	MF	ESP	Pablo Ríos Nieto
6	MF	ESP	Hugo Del Rio Revuelta
11	FW	ESP	Marco Diliberto Labarta
16	FW	ESP	David Rios Iglesias
18	FW	ESP	Iker Blanco Diez
17	Uknown	ESP	David Igoni Gonzalez
3	Uknown	ESP	Pablo Castanedo Fernandez
20	Uknown	ESP	Rafael Cueto Gutierrez
