= CD Mojados =

Spanish football club

Mojados
- Full name: Club Deportivo Mojados
- Founded: 1950
- Stadium: Municipal, Mojados, Castile and León, Spain
- Capacity: 2,000
- President: Junta Directiva
- Manager: Diego Macón
- League: Primera Regional – Group B
- 2025–26: Tercera Federación – Group 8, 16th of 18 (relegated)
Home colours	Away colours

Club Deportivo Mojados is a Spanish football club based in Mojados in the autonomous community of Castile and León. Founded in 1950, they play in Primera Regional – Group B, holding home games at Campo Municipal de Mojados, with a capacity of 2,000 people.

== Season to season ==
Season	Tier	Division	Place	Copa del Rey
1950–1987	—	Regional	—	
1987–88	6	1ª Reg.	12th	
1988–89	6	1ª Reg.	9th	
1989–90	6	1ª Reg.	12th	
1990–91	7	2ª Reg.	3rd	
1991–92	7	2ª Reg.	4th	
1992–93	7	2ª Reg.	10th	
1993–94	7	2ª Reg.	6th	
1994–95	7	2ª Reg.	6th	
1995–96	7	2ª Reg.	1st	
1996–97	6	1ª Reg.	9th	
1997–98	6	1ª Reg.	9th	
1998–99	6	1ª Reg.	5th	
1999–2000	6	1ª Prov.	4th	
2000–01	6	1ª Prov.	3rd	
2001–02	6	1ª Prov.	1st	
2002–03	5	1ª Reg.	16th	
2003–04	6	1ª Prov.	2nd	
2004–05	6	1ª Prov.	5th	
2005–06	6	1ª Prov.	6th	

Season	Tier	Division	Place	Copa del Rey
2006–07	6	1ª Prov.	5th	
2007–08	6	1ª Prov.	8th	
2008–09	6	1ª Prov.	11th	
2009–10	6	1ª Prov.	8th	
2010–11	6	1ª Prov.	1st	
2011–12	5	1ª Reg.	10th	
2012–13	5	1ª Reg.	7th	
2013–14	5	1ª Reg.	4th	
2014–15	5	1ª Reg.	8th	
2015–16	5	1ª Reg.	5th	
2016–17	5	1ª Reg.	11th	
2017–18	5	1ª Reg.	10th	
2018–19	5	1ª Reg.	10th	
2019–20	5	1ª Reg.	4th	
2020–21	5	1ª Reg.	4th	
2021–22	6	1ª Reg.	3rd	
2022–23	6	1ª Reg.	5th	
2023–24	6	1ª Reg.	3rd	
2024–25	5	3ª Fed.	12th	
2025–26	5	3ª Fed.		

- 2 seasons in Tercera Federación
