= CD Torreperogil =

Association football club in Spain

Torreperogil
- Full name: Club Deportivo Torreperogil
- Nickname: Sporting
- Founded: 1975; 2008 (refounded)
- Ground: Abdón Martínez Fariñas; Torreperogil, Spain
- Capacity: 3,000
- Chairman: Fernando Jiménez Redondo
- Manager: Antonio José García Muñoz
- League: Tercera Federación – Group 9
- 2024–25: Tercera Federación – Group 9, 8th of 18
Home colours

Club Deportivo Torreperogil is a Spanish football club located in Torreperogil, in the autonomous community of Andalusia. Founded in 1975 and refounded in 2008, it currently plays in Tercera Federación – Group 9, holding home matches at Estadio Abdón Martínez Fariñas, with a capacity of 3,000 spectators.

== History ==
There were different clubs from Torreperogil before, such as UD Perogilense, AD Torres and Sporting de Torreperogil. CD Torreperogil was refounded in 2008 and it became the main team of the town.

== Season to season ==
=== CD Torreperogil (1975) ===
| Season | Tier | Division | Place | Copa del Rey |
|---|---|---|---|---|
| 1979–80 | 6 | 1ª Reg. | 21st | |
| 1980–81 | 6 | 1ª Reg. | 12th | |
| 1981–82 | 5 | Reg. Pref. | 2nd | |
| 1982–83 | 5 | Reg. Pref. | 3rd | |
| 1983–84 | 4 | 3ª | 18th | |
| 1984–85 | 5 | Reg. Pref. | 20th | |
| 1985–1991 | DNP | | | |
| 1991–92 | 6 | 1ª Reg. | 10th | |

| Season | Tier | Division | Place | Copa del Rey |
|---|---|---|---|---|
| 1992–93 | 6 | 1ª Reg. | 2nd | |
| 1993–94 | 6 | 1ª Reg. | 10th | |
| 1994–95 | 6 | 1ª Reg. | 3rd | |
| 1995–96 | 5 | Reg. Pref. | 16th | |
| 1996–97 | 6 | 1ª Reg. | 2nd | |
| 1997–98 | 6 | 1ª Reg. | 6th | |
| 1998–99 | DNP | | | |
| 1999–2000 | 6 | 1ª Reg. | 9th | |

- 1 season in Tercera División

=== CD Torreperogil (2008) ===
| Season | Tier | Division | Place | Copa del Rey |
|---|---|---|---|---|
| 2008–09 | 7 | 1ª Prov. | 7th | |
| 2009–10 | 7 | 1ª Prov. | 9th | |
| 2010–11 | 7 | 1ª Prov. | 9th | |
| 2011–12 | 7 | 1ª Prov. | 11th | |
| 2012–13 | 7 | 1ª Prov. | 1st | |
| 2013–14 | 6 | Reg. Pref. | 7th | |
| 2014–15 | 6 | 2ª And. | 1st | |
| 2015–16 | 5 | 1ª And. | 5th | |
| 2016–17 | 5 | Div. Hon. | 5th | |
| 2017–18 | 5 | Div. Hon. | 1st | |
| 2018–19 | 4 | 3ª | 10th | |
| 2019–20 | 4 | 3ª | 13th | |
| 2020–21 | 4 | 3ª | 4th / 3rd | |
| 2021–22 | 5 | 3ª RFEF | 12th | |
| 2022–23 | 5 | 3ª Fed. | 11th | |
| 2023–24 | 5 | 3ª Fed. | 12th | |
| 2024–25 | 5 | 3ª Fed. | 8th | |
| 2025–26 | 5 | 3ª Fed. | | |

- 3 seasons in Tercera División
- 5 seasons in Tercera Federación/Tercera División RFEF
