= CD Guadalajara B =

Spanish football team

Guadalajara B
- Full name: Club Deportivo Guadalajara, S.A.D. "B"
- Nicknames: Dépor Promesas, Deportivo B
- Founded: 1990 (refounded); 2001 (refounded); 2007 (refounded)
- Ground: Fuente de la Niña, Guadalajara, Castile-La Mancha, Spain
- Capacity: 1,500
- President: Carlos Ávila
- Manager: Tito Ablanque
- League: Tercera Federación – Group 18
- 2025–26: Tercera Federación – Group 18, 9th of 18
Home colours	Away colours

Club Deportivo Guadalajara, S.A.D. "B" is the reserve team of CD Guadalajara, a Spanish football team based in Guadalajara, in the autonomous community of Castile-La Mancha. They play in Tercera Federación – Group 18, holding home games at Estadio Salto del Caballo, with a seating capacity of 5,300 spectators.

== History ==
Original history of Guadalajara's reserve side trace back to the 1970s, when a club named CD Guadalajara Promesas existed. They played for one season in the Primera Regional Preferente Castellana (1974–75), and ceased activities in 1986, after the departure of all clubs from Castilla-La Mancha from the Federación Castellana de Fútbol.

In 1990, a club named Patronato Deportivo Municipal Guadalajara was founded. The club was incorporated into the structure of CD Guadalajara in 1993, being named CD Guadalajara "B", but ceased activities in the following year.

In 2001, Guadalajara took newly-created side Club Deportivo Esperanza Salesianos as their farm team, and also renamed the side to Guadalajara B in the following year. However, they again ceased activities in 2003.

Back to action in 2007, Guadalajara B achieved two consecutive promotions to reach Primera Autonómica Preferente. In 2018, one season after suffering relegation, the club recovered their original name of Guadalajara Promesas, only returning to their former name of Guadalajara B in 2024, after a promotion back to the Preferente. In May 2025, the club achieved a first-ever promotion to Tercera Federación.

== Season to season ==
=== Guadalajara Promesas (1970s–1986) ===
Season	Tier	Division	Place	Copa del Rey
1974–75	4	Reg. Pref.	16th	
1975–1982	DNP			
1982–83	9	3ª Reg.	1st	
1983–84	8	3ª Reg. P.	2nd	
1984–85	8	3ª Reg. P.	4th	
1985–86	8	3ª Reg. P.	6th	

=== PDM Guadalajara (1990–1993) / Guadalajara B (1993–1994) ===
Season	Tier	Division	Place
1990–91	7	2ª Reg.	2nd
1991–92	6	1ª Reg.	9th
1992–93	7	2ª Reg.	3rd
1993–94	7	2ª Reg.	11th

=== Esperanza Salesianos (2001–2002) / Guadalajara B (2002–2003) ===
Season	Tier	Division	Place
2001–02	6	2ª Aut.	2nd
2002–03	6	2ª Aut.	2nd

=== Guadalajara B (2007–) ===
Season	Tier	Division	Place
2007–08	7	2ª Aut.	1st
2008–09	6	1ª Aut.	1st
2009–10	5	Aut. Pref.	10th
2010–11	5	Aut. Pref.	14th
2011–12	5	Aut. Pref.	3rd
2012–13	5	Aut. Pref.	8th
2013–14	5	Aut. Pref.	7th
2014–15	5	Aut. Pref.	5th
2015–16	5	Aut. Pref.	2nd
2016–17	5	Aut. Pref.	17th
2017–18	6	1ª Aut.	7th
2018–19	6	1ª Aut.	10th
2019–20	6	1ª Aut.	15th
2020–21	6	1ª Aut.	11th
2021–22	8	2ª Aut.	1st
2022–23	7	1ª Aut.	4th
2023–24	7	1ª Aut.	1st
2024–25	6	Aut. Pref.	1st
2025–26	5	3ª Fed.	9th
2026–27	5	3ª Fed.	

- 2 seasons in Tercera Federación
