= CD Belchite 97 =

Association football club in Spain

Belchite
- Full name: Club Deportivo Belchite 97
- Founded: 1997
- Ground: Municipal, Belchite, Aragon, Spain
- Capacity: 1000
- President: Fernando Nadal
- Head coach: José Collados
- League: Tercera Federación – Group 17
- 2025–26: Tercera Federación – Group 17, 14th of 18
| Home colours | Away colours |

Club Deportivo Belchite 97 is a Spanish football team based in Belchite, in the autonomous community of Aragon. Founded in 1997, it plays in Tercera Federación – Group 17, holding home matches at Campo de Fútbol Municipal de Belchite.

== History ==
Belchite were founded in 1997, but records of the club exist from 1945 to 1947. The club began participating in regional leagues under José Antonio Cubel in 1997. They were promoted back to Tercera División in 2015, after finishing second in their Regional Preferente group.

Belchite finished the next five seasons in the Tercera división placing in 16th, 16th, 15th, 16th, and 18th. In the 2020-21 season, the club managed to place above 15th for the first time, finishing in 3rd, their highest ever finish. The club qualified for the promotion groups, but lost to CD Binéfar in the promotion playoffs.

== Season to season ==
| Season | Tier | Division | Place | Copa del Rey |
|---|---|---|---|---|
| 1997–98 | 6 | 1ª Reg. | 16th | |
| 1998–99 | 6 | 1ª Reg. | 9th | |
| 1999–2000 | 6 | 1ª Reg. | 5th | |
| 2000–01 | 6 | 1ª Reg. | 14th | |
| 2001–02 | 6 | 1ª Reg. | 17th | |
| 2002–03 | 6 | 1ª Reg. | 6th | |
| 2003–04 | 6 | 1ª Reg. | 6th | |
| 2004–05 | 6 | 1ª Reg. | 1st | |
| 2005–06 | 5 | Reg. Pref. | 17th | |
| 2006–07 | 6 | 1ª Reg. | 3rd | |
| 2007–08 | 6 | 1ª Reg. | 2nd | |
| 2008–09 | 5 | Reg. Pref. | 13th | |
| 2009–10 | 5 | Reg. Pref. | 14th | |
| 2010–11 | 5 | Reg. Pref. | 6th | |
| 2011–12 | 5 | Reg. Pref. | 7th | |
| 2012–13 | 5 | Reg. Pref. | 4th | |
| 2013–14 | 5 | Reg. Pref. | 5th | |
| 2014–15 | 5 | Reg. Pref. | 2nd | |
| 2015–16 | 4 | 3ª | 16th | |
| 2016–17 | 4 | 3ª | 15th | |

| Season | Tier | Division | Place | Copa del Rey |
|---|---|---|---|---|
| 2017–18 | 4 | 3ª | 16th | |
| 2018–19 | 4 | 3ª | 16th | |
| 2019–20 | 4 | 3ª | 18th | |
| 2020–21 | 4 | 3ª | 3rd / 5th | |
| 2021–22 | 5 | 3ª RFEF | 13th | |
| 2022–23 | 6 | Reg. Pref. | 1st | |
| 2023–24 | 5 | 3ª Fed. | 15th | |
| 2024–25 | 5 | 3ª Fed. | 14th | |
| 2025–26 | 5 | 3ª Fed. | 14th | |
| 2026–27 | 5 | 3ª Fed. | | |

- 6 seasons in Tercera División
- 5 seasons in Tercera Federación/Tercera División RFEF
