= Atlético Porcuna CF =

Association football club in Spain

Atlético Porcuna
- Full name: Atlético de Porcuna Club de Fútbol
- Founded: 1975
- Ground: San Benito; Porcuna, Spain
- Capacity: 1,200
- Chairman: Andrés Salas Ortega
- Manager: Antonio Jesús Pastor Molina “Roger”
- League: Tercera Federación – Group 9
- 2025–26: Tercera Federación – Group 9, 9th of 18
- Website: http://www.atcoporcuna.es/
Home colours	Away colours

Atlético de Porcuna Club de Fútbol, known as Atlético Porcuna, is a Spanish football team based in Porcuna, in the autonomous community of Andalusia. Founded in 1975 it currently plays in Tercera Federación – Group 9, holding home matches at Estadio Municipal San Benito, with a capacity of 1,200 spectators.

== History ==
The club was founded in 1975 and played in the lower regional categories, achieving the first promotion to the Tercera División in 2019.

== Season to season ==
Season	Tier	Division	Place	Copa del Rey
1976–77	6	2ª Reg.	4th	
1977–78	7	2ª Reg.	1st	
1978–79	6	1ª Reg.	14th	
1979–80	6	1ª Reg.	14th	
1980–81	5	Reg. Pref.	17th	
1981–82	5	Reg. Pref.	6th	
1982–83	6	1ª Reg.	11th	
1983–84	6	1ª Reg.	9th	
1984–85	6	1ª Reg.	7th	
1985–86	6	1ª Reg.	9th	
1986–87	6	1ª Reg.	2nd	
1987–88	5	Reg. Pref.	5th	
1988–89	5	Reg. Pref.	11th	
1989–90	5	Reg. Pref.	15th	
1990–91	5	Reg. Pref.	9th	
1991–92	5	Reg. Pref.	13th	
1992–93	5	Reg. Pref.	14th	
1993–94	5	Reg. Pref.	10th	
1994–95	5	Reg. Pref.	3rd	
1995–96	5	Reg. Pref.	11th	

Season	Tier	Division	Place	Copa del Rey
1996–97	5	Reg. Pref.	18th	
1997–98	6	1ª Reg.	4th	
1998–99	5	Reg. Pref.	4th	
1999–2000	5	Reg. Pref.	8th	
2000–01	5	Reg. Pref.	7th	
2001–02	DNP			
2002–03	6	1ª Reg.	2nd	
2003–04	5	Reg. Pref.	13th	
2004–2008	DNP			
2008–09	7	1ª Prov.	5th	
2009–10	7	1ª Prov.	3rd	
2010–11	6	Reg. Pref.	7th	
2011–12	6	Reg. Pref.	7th	
2012–13	6	Reg. Pref.	1st	
2013–14	5	1ª And.	10th	
2014–15	5	1ª And.	5th	
2015–16	5	1ª And.	4th	
2016–17	5	Div. Hon.	4th	
2017–18	5	Div. Hon.	5th	
2018–19	5	Div. Hon.	1st	

Season	Tier	Division	Place	Copa del Rey
2019–20	4	3ª	19th	Preliminary
2020–21	4	3ª	10th / 4th	
2021–22	5	3ª RFEF	9th	
2022–23	5	3ª Fed.	15th	
2023–24	6	Div. Hon.	2nd	
2024–25	5	3ª Fed.	15th	
2025–26	5	3ª Fed.	9th	
2026–27	5	3ª Fed.		

- 2 seasons in Tercera División
- 5 season in Tercera Federación/Tercera División RFEF
