= San Bartolomé CF =

- Full name: San Bartolomé Club de Fútbol
- Nickname: Batata Mecánico (Clockwork potato)
- Founded: 1 August 1972; 54 years ago
- Ground: Municipal de Las Palmeras, San Bartolomé
- Capacity: 2,000
- President: Juan Elvira
- Manager: José Labrador
- League: Tercera Federación – Group 12
- 2025–26: Tercera Federación – Group 12, 14th of 18
- Website: http://www.sanbartolomecf.com/
Home colours	Away colours

San Bartolomé Club de Fútbol is a football team based in San Bartolomé, Las Palmas, in the Canary Islands. Founded in 1972, they play in Tercera Federación – Group 12, holding home matches at the Municipal de Las Palmeras, with a capacity of 2,000 seats.

== History ==
San Bartolomé was founded in August 1972, after the decision of the San Bartolomé City Council to create a team for the leisure of its citizens. After playing in the lower levels, the club achieved a first-ever promotion to the Interinsular Preferente de Las Palmas in the 2010–11 season.

In the following years, San Bartolomé would fluctuate between the fifth and sixth divisions, suffering relegations in 2013 and 2017, but achieving promotions in 2016 and 2020. On 21 May 2023, the club achieved promotion to a national division for the first time in their history, reaching the Tercera Federación after defeating CF Unión Viera 1–0 on aggregate in the promotion play-offs.

== Season to season ==
Season	Tier	Division	Place	Copa del Rey
1972–1981	—	Regional	—	
1981–82	8	3ª Reg.	6th	
1982–83	8	3ª Reg.	6th	
1983–84	8	3ª Reg.		
1984–85	7	2ª Reg.		
1985–86	6	1ª Reg.	7th	
1986–87	6	1ª Reg.		
1987–88	6	1ª Reg.		
1988–89	6	1ª Reg.		
1989–90	6	1ª Reg.		
1990–91	6	1ª Reg.	11th	
1991–92	6	1ª Reg.	5th	
1992–93	6	1ª Reg.	2nd	
1993–94	6	1ª Reg.	2nd	
1994–95	6	1ª Reg.	8th	
1995–96	6	1ª Reg.	3rd	
1996–97	6	1ª Reg.	7th	
1997–98	6	1ª Reg.	7th	
1998–99	6	1ª Reg.	1st	
1999–2000	6	1ª Reg.	11th	

Season	Tier	Division	Place	Copa del Rey
2000–01	6	1ª Reg.	4th	
2001–02	6	1ª Reg.	5th	
2002–03	6	1ª Reg.	11th	
2003–04	6	1ª Reg.	9th	
2004–05	6	1ª Reg.	7th	
2005–06	6	1ª Reg.	10th	
2006–07	6	1ª Reg.	4th	
2007–08	6	1ª Reg.	8th	
2008–09	6	1ª Reg.	3rd	
2009–10	6	1ª Reg.	4th	
2010–11	6	1ª Reg.	1st	
2011–12	5	Int. Pref.	6th	
2012–13	5	Int. Pref.	15th	
2013–14	6	1ª Reg.	3rd	
2014–15	6	1ª Reg.	2nd	
2015–16	6	1ª Reg.	1st	
2016–17	5	Int. Pref.	15th	
2017–18	6	1ª Reg.	1st	
2018–19	6	1ª Reg.	2nd	
2019–20	6	1ª Reg.	1st	

Season	Tier	Division	Place	Copa del Rey
2020–21	5	Int. Pref.	8th	
2021–22	6	Int. Pref.	2nd	
2022–23	6	Int. Pref.	2nd	
2023–24	5	3ª Fed.	8th	
2024–25	5	3ª Fed.	10th	
2025–26	5	3ª Fed.	14th	
2026–27	5	3ª Fed.		

- 4 seasons in Tercera Federación
