= Yeclano Deportivo B =

Yeclano B
- Full name: Yeclano Deportivo "B"
- Founded: 2012
- Ground: Juan Palao Azorín, Yecla, Murcia, Spain
- Capacity: 500
- President: Pedro Romero
- Manager: David Romero "Biri"
- League: Preferente Autonómica
- 2025–26: Tercera Federación – Group 13, 18th of 18 (relegated)
Home colours	Away colours

Yeclano Deportivo "B" is a Spanish football club based in Yecla, in the Region of Murcia. Founded in 2012, they are the reserve team of Yeclano Deportivo, and currently play in Preferente Autonómica, holding home matches at the Polideportivo Municipal Juan Palao Azorín.

== History ==
Established in 2012 as the reserve team of Yeclano Deportivo, the club immediately started playing in the Primera Autonómica, winning the league and promoting to Preferente Autonómica. After suffering immediate relegation, the club only returned to the fifth tier in 2020.

On 22 June 2025, Yeclano B achieved a first-ever promotion to Tercera Federación, after defeating CAP Ciudad de Murcia in the play-offs.

== Season to season ==
Season	Tier	Division	Place
2012–13	6	1ª Aut.	1st
2013–14	5	Pref. Aut.	13th
2014–15	6	1ª Aut.	16th
2015–16	6	1ª Aut.	17th
2016–17	7	2ª Aut.	5th
2017–18	7	2ª Aut.	1st
2018–19	6	1ª Aut.	3rd
2019–20	6	1ª Aut.	3rd
2020–21	5	Pref. Aut.	8th
2021–22	6	Pref. Aut.	8th
2022–23	6	Pref. Aut.	5th
2023–24	6	Pref. Aut.	6th
2024–25	6	Pref. Aut.	4th
2025–26	5	3ª Fed.	

- 1 season in Tercera Federación
