= Unionistas de Salamanca CF B =

Spanish football club in Salamanca

Unionistas B
- Full name: Unionistas de Salamanca Club de Fútbol "B"
- Nickname: Unionistas
- Founded: 2015
- Ground: Reina Sofía, Salamanca, Salamanca, Spain
- Capacity: 4,895
- President: Roberto Pescador
- Head coach: Gabri de Aller
- League: Tercera Federación – Group 8
- 2025–26: Tercera Federación – Group 8, 15th of 18
- Website: https://unionistascf.com/
Home colours	Away colours

Unionistas de Salamanca Club de Fútbol "B" is a Spanish football club in Salamanca, in the autonomous community of Castile and León. Founded in 2015, they are the reserve team of Unionistas de Salamanca CF, and play in Tercera Federación – Group 8, holding home games at Campo de Fútbol Municipal Reina Sofía with a 4895-seat capacity.

== History ==
In June 2015, Unionistas de Salamanca CF announced the creation of a new reserve team with Javier Villarón as their manager; in July, the club's associates chose the name of "Unionistas B" to the new side. In May of the following year, however, the B-team was disbanded due to the high cost of operations.

On 13 July 2021, Unionistas announced the return of the reserve team ahead of the 2021–22 season. The club achieved an immediate promotion from the Primera Provincial, and after three seasons in Primera Regional, achieved a first-ever promotion to Tercera Federación in May 2025.

== Season to season ==
Season	Tier	Division	Place
2015–16	6	1ª Prov.	6th
2016–2021	DNP		
2021–22	7	1ª Prov.	1st
2022–23	6	1ª Reg.	13th
2023–24	6	1ª Reg.	4th
2024–25	6	1ª Reg.	1st
2025–26	5	3ª Fed.	15th
2026–27	5	3ª Fed.	

- 2 seasons in Tercera Federación
