= CD Colegios Diocesanos =

Association football club in Spain

Colegios Diocesanos
- Full name: Club Deportivo Colegios Diocesanos
- Founded: 26 February 1986; 40 years ago
- Ground: Sancti Spiritu
- Capacity: 1,500
- Chairman: Javier Jiménez
- Manager: Alberto
- League: Tercera Federación – Group 8
- 2025–26: Tercera Federación – Group 8, 13th of 18
- Website: http://cdcolegiosdiocesanos.es
Home colours	Away colours

Club Deportivo Colegios Santos Diocesanos is a Spanish football club based in Ávila, in the autonomous community of Castile and León. Founded in 1986, it plays in Tercera Federación – Group 8, holding home games at Campo de Fútbol de Sancti Spiritu, with a capacity of 1,500 people.

== History ==
Founded on 28 February 1986, the club only played youth football until 2014, when it started their senior side. In 2020, they achieved a first-ever promotion to Tercera División.

=== Club background ===
- Club Deportivo Colegios Diocesanos (1986–2021; 2023–present)
- Diocesanos - Universidad Católica de Ávila (2021–2022)
- DiocesÁvila - Universidad Católica de Ávila (2022–2023)

== Season to season ==
Season	Tier	Division	Place	Copa del Rey
2014–15	6	1ª Prov.	2nd	
2015–16	6	1ª Prov.	1st	
2016–17	5	1ª Reg.	4th	
2017–18	5	1ª Reg.	4th	
2018–19	5	1ª Reg.	3rd	
2019–20	5	1ª Reg.	1st	
2020–21	4	3ª	8th / 3rd	Preliminary
2021–22	5	3ª RFEF	17th	
2022–23	6	1ª Reg.	1st	
2023–24	5	3ª Fed.	17th	
2024–25	6	1ª Reg.	1st	
2025–26	5	3ª Fed.	13th	
2026–27	5	3ª Fed.		

- 1 season in Tercera División
- 4 seasons in Tercera Federación/Tercera División RFEF
