= FC Bidezarra =

Association football club in Spain

Bidezarra
- Full name: Fútbol Club Bidezarra
- Founded: 1996
- Ground: Municipal El Soto, Noáin, Navarre, Spain
- Capacity: 2,000
- President: Javier San Martín
- Manager: Iñaki Casado
- League: Tercera Federación – Group 15
- 2025–26: Tercera Federación – Group 15, 13th of 18
- Website: https://fcbidezarra.eu/
Home colours	Away colours

Fútbol Club Bidezarra is a Spanish football team based in Noáin in the autonomous community of Navarre. Founded in 1996, it plays in Tercera Federación – Group 15, holding home matches at the Estadio Municipal El Soto, with a capacity of 2,000 people.

== Season to season ==
Season	Tier	Division	Place	Copa del Rey
1997–98	6	1ª Reg.	5th	
1998–99	6	1ª Reg.	8th	
1999–2000	6	1ª Reg.	12th	
2000–01	6	1ª Reg.	7th	
2001–02	6	1ª Reg.	4th	
2002–03	6	1ª Reg.	4th	
2003–04	6	1ª Reg.	10th	
2004–05	6	1ª Reg.	4th	
2005–06	6	1ª Reg.	5th	
2006–07	6	1ª Reg.	1st	
2007–08	6	1ª Reg.	4th	
2008–09	6	1ª Reg.	5th	
2009–10	6	1ª Reg.	7th	
2010–11	6	1ª Reg.	5th	
2011–12	6	1ª Reg.	9th	
2012–13	6	1ª Reg.	6th	
2013–14	6	1ª Reg.	2nd	
2014–15	6	1ª Reg.	2nd	
2015–16	6	Reg. Pref.	4th	
2016–17	6	Reg. Pref.	1st	

Season	Tier	Division	Place	Copa del Rey
2017–18	5	1ª Aut.	5th	
2018–19	5	1ª Aut.	9th	
2019–20	5	1ª Aut.	3rd	
2020–21	4	3ª	11th / 6th	
2021–22	6	1ª Aut.	2nd	
2022–23	6	1ª Aut.	1st	
2023–24	5	3ª Fed.	12th	
2024–25	5	3ª Fed.	11th	
2025–26	5	3ª Fed.	13th	
2026–27	5	3ª Fed.		

- 1 season in Tercera División
- 4 seasons in Tercera Federación
