= CD Zuera =

Zuera
- Full name: Club Deportivo Zuera
- Founded: 1923
- Ground: José Guzmán, Zuera, Aragón, Spain
- Capacity: 2,500
- Chairman: Augusto Gascón
- Manager: José Luis Blanco
- League: Tercera Federación – Group 17
- 2024–25: Tercera Federación – Group 17, 6th of 18
Home colours	Away colours

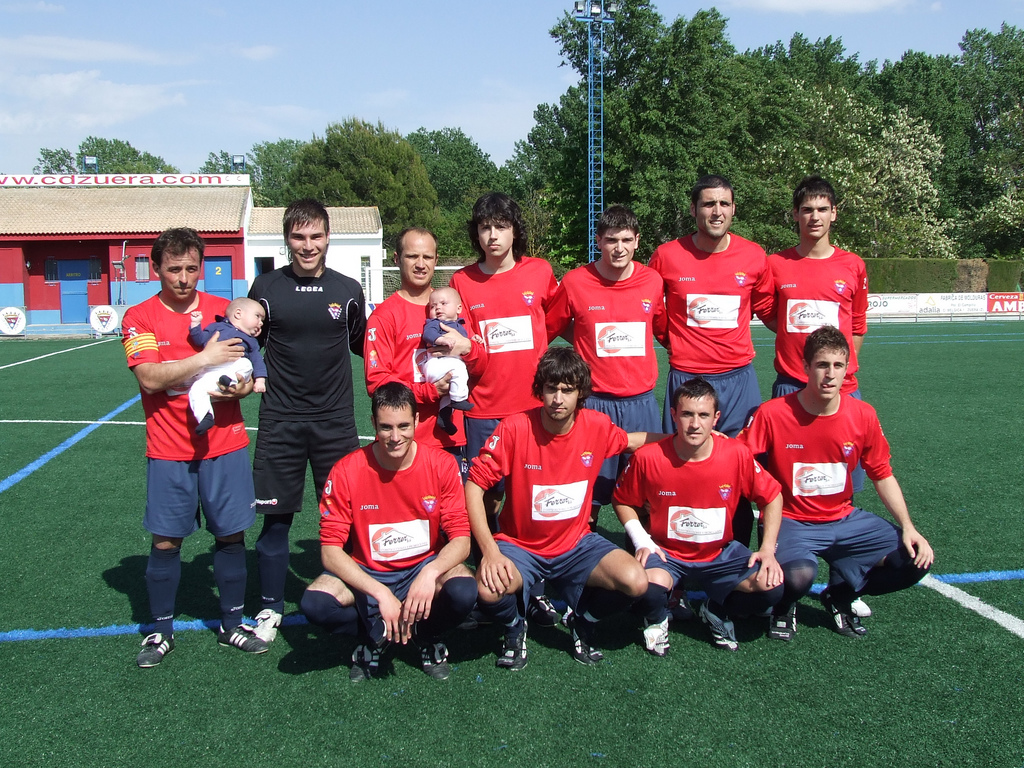
Starting eleven against CD Altorricón in 2008.

Club Deportivo Zuera is a Spanish football team based in Zuera in the community of Aragón. Founded in 1923, it plays in Tercera Federación – Group 17.

== Season to season ==
Season	Tier	Division	Place	Copa del Rey
1941–42	6	3ª Reg.	5th	
1942–43	4	2ª Reg.	3rd	
1943–44	4	2ª Reg.	3rd	
1944–45	4	1ª Reg.	4th	
1945–1953	DNP			
1953–54	5	2ª Reg.	1st	
1954–55	5	2ª Reg.	1st	
1955–56	4	1ª Reg.	3rd	
1956–57	4	1ª Reg.	4th	
1957–58	4	1ª Reg.	6th	
1958–59	4	1ª Reg.	6th	
1959–60	4	1ª Reg.	3rd	
1960–1967	DNP			
1967–68	5	2ª Reg.	2nd	
1968–69	5	1ª Reg.	9th	
1969–70	5	1ª Reg.	4th	
1970–71	5	1ª Reg.	7th	
1971–72	5	1ª Reg.	5th	
1972–73	5	1ª Reg.	9th	
1973–74	5	1ª Reg.	7th	

Season	Tier	Division	Place	Copa del Rey
1974–75	5	1ª Reg.	13th	
1975–76	5	1ª Reg.	10th	
1976–77	5	1ª Reg.	4th	
1977–78	5	Reg. Pref.	12th	
1978–79	5	Reg. Pref.	8th	
1979–80	5	Reg. Pref.	10th	
1980–81	5	Reg. Pref.	14th	
1981–82	5	Reg. Pref.	14th	
1982–83	5	Reg. Pref.	10th	
1983–84	5	Reg. Pref.	14th	
1984–85	5	Reg. Pref.	20th	
1985–86	6	1ª Reg.	7th	
1986–87	6	1ª Reg.	7th	
1987–88	6	1ª Reg.	3rd	
1988–89	6	1ª Reg.	7th	
1989–90	6	1ª Reg.	12th	
1990–91	6	1ª Reg.	6th	
1991–92	6	1ª Reg.	2nd	
1992–93	5	Reg. Pref.	10th	
1993–94	5	Reg. Pref.	8th	

Season	Tier	Division	Place	Copa del Rey
1994–95	5	Reg. Pref.	8th	
1995–96	5	Reg. Pref.	16th	
1996–97	6	1ª Reg.	1st	
1997–98	5	Reg. Pref.	1st	
1998–99	4	3ª	18th	
1999–2000	5	Reg. Pref.	1st	
2000–01	4	3ª	6th	
2001–02	4	3ª	3rd	
2002–03	4	3ª	13th	
2003–04	4	3ª	11th	
2004–05	4	3ª	16th	
2005–06	4	3ª	14th	
2006–07	4	3ª	18th	
2007–08	5	Reg. Pref.	3rd	
2008–09	4	3ª	19th	
2009–10	5	Reg. Pref.	10th	
2010–11	5	Reg. Pref.	6th	
2011–12	5	Reg. Pref.	11th	
2012–13	5	Reg. Pref.	17th	
2013–14	6	1ª Reg.	2nd	

Season	Tier	Division	Place	Copa del Rey
2014–15	5	Reg. Pref.	17th	
2015–16	6	1ª Reg.	6th	
2016–17	6	1ª Reg.	11th	
2017–18	6	1ª Reg.	2nd	
2018–19	5	Reg. Pref.	5th	
2019–20	5	Reg. Pref.	5th	
2020–21	5	Reg. Pref.	4th	
2021–22	6	Reg. Pref.	7th	
2022–23	6	Reg. Pref.	8th	
2023–24	6	Reg. Pref.	1st	
2024–25	5	3ª Fed.	6th	
2025–26	5	3ª Fed.		

- 9 seasons in Tercera División
- 2 seasons in Tercera Federación
