= CD Cariñena =

Spanish football club

Cariñena
- Full name: Club Deportivo Cariñena
- Founded: 1952
- Ground: La Platera, Cariñena, Aragón, Spain
- Capacity: 1,000
- President: Antonio Galindo Soria
- Manager: Humberto Arto
- League: Regional Preferente – Group 2
- 2025–26: Tercera Federación – Group 17, 15th of 18 (relegated)
Home colours	Away colours

Club Deportivo Cariñena is a Spanish football team based in Cariñena, in the community of Aragón. Founded in 1952, they play in Regional Preferente – Group 2, holding home matches at the Campo de Fútbol La Platera.

== Season to season ==
Season	Tier	Division	Place	Copa del Rey
1952–53	6	3ª Reg.	1st	
1953–54	4	1ª Reg.	14th	
1954–55	4	1ª Reg.	6th	
1955–56	4	1ª Reg.	4th	
1956–57	3	3ª	18th	
1957–58	3	3ª	(R)	
1958–1968	DNP			
1968–69	6	3ª Reg.		
1969–70	6	3ª Reg.		
1970–71	6	2ª Reg.	9th	
1971–72	6	2ª Reg.	16th	
1972–73	7	2ª Reg.	1st	
1973–74	6	2ª Reg. P.	7th	
1974–75	6	2ª Reg. P.	14th	
1975–76	6	2ª Reg. P.	13th	
1976–77	6	2ª Reg. P.	6th	
1977–78	6	1ª Reg.	15th	
1978–79	6	1ª Reg.	7th	
1979–80	6	1ª Reg.	15th	
1980–81	6	1ª Reg.	12th	

Season	Tier	Division	Place	Copa del Rey
1981–82	6	1ª Reg.	2nd	
1982–83	5	Reg. Pref.	14th	
1983–84	5	Reg. Pref.	20th	
1984–85	6	1ª Reg.	13th	
1985–86	6	1ª Reg.	6th	
1986–87	6	1ª Reg.	3rd	
1987–88	5	Reg. Pref.	8th	
1988–89	5	Reg. Pref.	16th	
1989–90	6	1ª Reg.	16th	
1990–91	7	2ª Reg.	7th	
1991–92	7	2ª Reg.	1st	
1992–93	6	1ª Reg.	2nd	
1993–94	5	Reg. Pref.	17th	
1994–95	6	1ª Reg.	9th	
1995–96	6	1ª Reg.	13th	
1996–97	6	1ª Reg.	14th	
1997–98	6	1ª Reg.	10th	
1998–99	6	1ª Reg.	15th	
1999–2000	6	1ª Reg.	15th	
2000–01	6	1ª Reg.	12th	

Season	Tier	Division	Place	Copa del Rey
2001–02	6	1ª Reg.	13th	
2002–03	6	1ª Reg.	12th	
2003–04	6	1ª Reg.	18th	
2004–05	7	2ª Reg.	5th	
2005–06	7	2ª Reg.	4th	
2006–07	7	2ª Reg.	4th	
2007–08	7	2ª Reg.	1st	
2008–09	6	1ª Reg.	15th	
2009–10	6	1ª Reg.	14th	
2010–11	6	1ª Reg.	12th	
2011–12	6	1ª Reg.	12th	
2012–13	6	1ª Reg.	1st	
2013–14	5	Reg. Pref.	11th	
2014–15	5	Reg. Pref.	1st	
2015–16	4	3ª	9th	
2016–17	4	3ª	14th	
2017–18	4	3ª	19th	
2018–19	5	Reg. Pref.	3rd	
2019–20	5	Reg. Pref.	2nd	
2020–21	4	3ª	8th / 4th	

Season	Tier	Division	Place	Copa del Rey
2021–22	5	3ª RFEF	11th	
2022–23	5	3ª Fed.	15th	
2023–24	5	3ª Fed.	18th	
2024–25	6	Reg. Pref.	1st	
2025–26	5	3ª Fed.		

- 4 seasons in Tercera División
- 3 seasons in Tercera Federación/Tercera División RFEF
