= Atlético Santa Cruz =

- Full name: Atlético Santa Cruz
- Founded: 2020
- Ground: La Peñeta, Murcia, Spain
- Capacity: 500
- President: César Manuel Segura López
- Manager: Jesús Zapata
- League: Tercera Federación – Group 13
- 2025–26: Tercera Federación – Group 13, 8th of 18
Home colours	Away colours

Atlético Santa Cruz (formerly known as Escuela de Fútbol Santa Cruz) is a Spanish football club based in Murcia, in the Region of Murcia. Founded in 2020, they currently play in Tercera Federación – Group 13, holding home matches at the Campo de Fútbol Municipal de Los Ramos, nicknamed La Peñeta.

== History ==
Founded in 2020 as Escuela de Fútbol Santa Cruz, Atlético Santa Cruz immediately achieved two consecutive promotions to the Preferente Autonómica in 2022, adopting their current name in 2021. In April 2025, the club achieved a first-ever promotion to the Tercera Federación.

== Season to season ==
Season	Tier	Division	Place	Copa del Rey
2020–21	7	2ª Aut.	2nd	
2021–22	7	1ª Aut.	8th	
2022–23	6	Pref. Aut.	7th	
2023–24	6	Pref. Aut.	7th	
2024–25	6	Pref. Aut.	3rd	
2025–26	5	3ª Fed.	8th	
2026–27	5	3ª Fed.		

- 2 seasons in Tercera Federación
