= Churriana de la Vega CF =

Spanish football team

Churriana de la Vega
- Full name: Churriana de la Vega Club de Fútbol
- Founded: 1946
- Ground: El Frascuelo, Churriana de la Vega, Andalusia, Spain
- Capacity: 1,000
- President: Francisco Cortés
- Manager: Levi Cantero
- League: Tercera Federación – Group 9
- 2025–26: Tercera Federación – Group 9, 5th of 18
Home colours	Away colours

Churriana de la Vega Club de Fútbol is a Spanish football team based in Churriana de la Vega, in the autonomous community of Andalusia. Founded in 1946, they play in Tercera Federación – Group 9, holding home matches at Estadio Municipal El Frascuelo, with a capacity of 1,000 people.

== History ==
Founded in 1946 as Churriana Club de Fútbol, the club changed name to Churriana de la Vega Club de Fútbol in 2022. In June 2023, the club achieved promotion to the División de Honor after FC Málaga City remained in Tercera Federación. In April 2025, the club achieved a first-ever promotion to a national division, reaching Tercera Federación.

== Season to season ==
Season	Tier	Division	Place	Copa del Rey
1946–1966	—	Regional	—	
1966–67	4	1ª Reg.	6th	
1967–68	4	1ª Reg.	3rd	
1968–69	4	1ª Reg.	8th	
1969–70	4	1ª Reg.	18th	
1970–71	5	2ª Reg.	7th	
1971–1975	DNP			
1975–76	5	1ª Reg.	4th	
1976–77	5	1ª Reg.	20th	
1977–78	6	1ª Reg.	17th	
1978–79	7	2ª Reg.	4th	
1979–80	7	2ª Reg.	5th	
1980–81	6	1ª Reg.	13th	
1981–82	5	Reg. Pref.	15th	
1982–83	6	1ª Reg.	5th	
1983–84	5	Reg. Pref.	2nd	
1984–85	5	Reg. Pref.	11th	
1985–86	5	Reg. Pref.	3rd	
1986–87	5	Reg. Pref.	14th	
1987–88	5	Reg. Pref.	16th	

Season	Tier	Division	Place	Copa del Rey
1988–89	6	1ª Reg.	1st	
1989–90	5	Reg. Pref.	15th	
1990–91	5	Reg. Pref.	14th	
1991–92	5	Reg. Pref.	15th	
1992–93	6	1ª Reg.	6th	
1993–94	6	1ª Reg.	3rd	
1994–95	5	Reg. Pref.	18th	
1995–96	6	1ª Reg.	3rd	
1996–97	5	Reg. Pref.	7th	
1997–98	5	Reg. Pref.	1st	
1998–99	5	Reg. Pref.	6th	
1999–2000	5	Reg. Pref.	9th	
2000–01	5	Reg. Pref.	3rd	
2001–02	5	Reg. Pref.	5th	
2002–03	5	Reg. Pref.	7th	
2003–04	5	Reg. Pref.	3rd	
2004–05	5	1ª And.	8th	
2005–06	5	1ª And.	12th	
2006–07	5	1ª And.	9th	
2007–08	5	1ª And.	7th	

Season	Tier	Division	Place	Copa del Rey
2008–09	5	1ª And.	12th	
2009–10	5	1ª And.	15th	
2010–11	6	Reg. Pref.	6th	
2011–12	6	Reg. Pref.	1st	
2012–13	5	1ª And.	14th	
2013–14	5	1ª And.	13th	
2014–15	5	1ª And.	10th	
2015–16	5	1ª And.	13th	
2016–17	6	1ª And.	1st	
2017–18	5	Div. Hon.	17th	
2018–19	6	1ª And.	2nd	
2019–20	6	1ª And.	2nd	
2020–21	6	1ª And.	2nd	
2021–22	7	1ª And.	1st	
2022–23	7	1ª And.	1st	
2023–24	6	Div. Hon.	7th	
2024–25	6	Div. Hon.	2nd	
2025–26	5	3ª Fed.	5th	
2026–27	5	3ª Fed.		

- 2 seasons in Tercera Federación
