= Castilleja CF =

Spanish football club

Castilleja
- Full name: Castilleja Club de Fútbol
- Founded: 1929
- Ground: Antonio Almendro, Castilleja de la Cuesta, Andalusia, Spain
- Capacity: 1,000
- President: Ginés López-Cirera
- Manager: Manuel Fidalgo
- League: División de Honor – Group 1
- 2025–26: Tercera Federación – Group 10, 17th of 18 (relegated)
Home colours	Away colours

Castilleja Club de Fútbol is a Spanish football team based in Castilleja de la Cuesta, Province of Seville, in the autonomous community of Andalusia. Founded in 1929, they play in División de Honor – Group 1, holding home games at Estadio Municipal Antonio Almendro, with a capacity of 1,000 people.

== History ==
Founded in 1929, Castilleja played in regional leagues until 2015, when the club achieved a first-ever promotion to Tercera División. The club spent three consecutive seasons in the division before suffering relegation in May 2018.

In May 2020, Castilleja returned to the fourth division, but suffered immediate relegation. In May 2025, the club returned to a national division after achieving promotion to Tercera Federación.

== Season to season ==
Season	Tier	Division	Place	Copa del Rey
1929–1972	—	Regional	—	
1972–73	5	2ª Reg.	6th	
1973–74	5	2ª Reg.	7th	
1974–75	5	2ª Reg.	1st	
1975–76	6	2ª Reg.		
1976–77	6	2ª Reg.		
1977–78	7	2ª Reg.		
1978–79	7	2ª Reg.	19th	
1979–80	7	2ª Reg.	14th	
1980–81	8	2ª Reg. B	12th	
1981–82	8	2ª Reg. B	7th	
1982–83	8	2ª Reg. B	1st	
1983–84	7	2ª Reg.	1st	
1984–85	6	1ª Reg.	1st	
1985–86	5	Reg. Pref.	20th	
1986–87	6	1ª Reg.	8th	
1987–88	6	1ª Reg.	7th	
1988–89	6	1ª Reg.	2nd	
1989–90	5	Reg. Pref.	14th	
1990–91	5	Reg. Pref.	18th	

Season	Tier	Division	Place	Copa del Rey
1991–92	6	1ª Reg.	3rd	
1992–93	6	1ª Reg.	1st	
1993–94	5	Reg. Pref.	6th	
1994–95	5	Reg. Pref.	17th	
1995–96	6	1ª Reg.	5th	
1996–97	6	1ª Reg.	3rd	
1997–98	6	1ª Reg.	9th	
1998–99	6	1ª Reg.	2nd	
1999–2000	6	1ª Reg.	5th	
2000–01	6	1ª Prov.	1st	
2001–02	5	Reg. Pref.	4th	
2002–03	5	Reg. Pref.	4th	
2003–04	5	Reg. Pref.	2nd	
2004–05	5	1ª And.	3rd	
2005–06	5	1ª And.	2nd	
2006–07	5	1ª And.	8th	
2007–08	5	1ª And.	7th	
2008–09	5	1ª And.	8th	
2009–10	5	1ª And.	11th	
2010–11	5	1ª And.	11th	

Season	Tier	Division	Place	Copa del Rey
2011–12	5	1ª And.	11th	
2012–13	5	1ª And.	7th	
2013–14	5	1ª And.	3rd	
2014–15	5	1ª And.	1st	
2015–16	4	3ª	9th	
2016–17	4	3ª	16th	
2017–18	4	3ª	20th	
2018–19	5	Div. Hon.	7th	
2019–20	5	Div. Hon.	1st	
2020–21	4	3ª	9th / 5th	
2021–22	6	Div. Hon.	6th	
2022–23	6	Div. Hon.	7th	
2023–24	6	Div. Hon.	6th	
2024–25	6	Div. Hon.	3rd	
2025–26	5	3ª Fed.		

- 4 seasons in Tercera División
- 1 season in Tercera Federación
