= CD Avance Ezcabarte =

Avance
- Full name: Club Deportivo Avance Ezcabarte
- Founded: 1973
- Ground: Igueldea, Arre, Ezcabarte, Navarre, Spain
- Capacity: 1,000
- President: Fernando Huarte
- Manager: Elías Tomé
- League: Tercera Federación – Group 15
- 2025–26: Tercera Federación – Group 15, 8th of 18
- Website: https://cdavanceezcabarte.es/
Home colours	Away colours

Club Deportivo Avance Ezcabarte is a Spanish football team based in Arre, Ezcabarte, in the autonomous community of Navarre. Founded in 1973, they play in Tercera Federación – Group 15, holding home matches at the Campo Igueldea, with a capacity of 1,000 people.

== History ==
Founded in 1973 as Club Deportivo Avance, the club merged with Club Deportivo Ezcabarte in 1988 to form Club Deportivo Avance Ezcabarte. After playing in the regional leagues, they achieved a first-ever promotion to Tercera División in 2006, but suffered immediate relegation.

Avance only returned to Tercera in May 2018, again only spending a single season in the division. They would return to a national division in May 2021, after assuring promotion to newly-created Tercera División RFEF, and managed to stay three campaigns in the category.

In May 2025, Avance returned to the fifth division after a one-year absence.

== Season to season ==
Season	Tier	Division	Place	Copa del Rey
1974–75	6	2ª Reg.	16th	
1975–76	6	2ª Reg.	13th	
1976–77	6	2ª Reg.	8th	
1977–78	7	2ª Reg.	12th	
1978–79	7	2ª Reg.	11th	
1979–80	7	2ª Reg.	9th	
1980–81	7	2ª Reg.	5th	
1981–82	7	2ª Reg.	5th	
1982–83	7	2ª Reg.	7th	
1983–84	7	2ª Reg.	5th	
1984–85	6	1ª Reg.	15th	
1985–86	7	2ª Reg.	5th	
1986–87	6	1ª Reg.	10th	
1987–88	6	1ª Reg.	17th	
1988–89	6	1ª Reg.	6th	
1989–90	6	1ª Reg.	13th	
1990–91	6	1ª Reg.	16th	
1991–92	6	1ª Reg.	14th	
1992–93	6	1ª Reg.	1st	
1993–94	6	1ª Reg.	5th	

Season	Tier	Division	Place	Copa del Rey
1994–95	6	1ª Reg.	5th	
1995–96	6	1ª Reg.	2nd	
1996–97	6	1ª Reg.	5th	
1997–98	6	1ª Reg.	7th	
1998–99	6	1ª Reg.	6th	
1999–2000	6	1ª Reg.	3rd	
2000–01	6	1ª Reg.	3rd	
2001–02	5	Reg. Pref.	20th	
2002–03	6	1ª Reg.	3rd	
2003–04	6	1ª Reg.	1st	
2004–05	5	Reg. Pref.	4th	
2005–06	5	Reg. Pref.	3rd	
2006–07	4	3ª	20th	
2007–08	5	Reg. Pref.	9th	
2008–09	5	Reg. Pref.	12th	
2009–10	5	Reg. Pref.	4th	
2010–11	5	Reg. Pref.	3rd	
2011–12	5	Reg. Pref.	6th	
2012–13	5	Reg. Pref.	2nd	
2013–14	5	Reg. Pref.	4th	

Season	Tier	Division	Place	Copa del Rey
2014–15	5	Reg. Pref.	10th	
2015–16	5	1ª Aut.	5th	
2016–17	5	1ª Aut.	5th	
2017–18	5	1ª Aut.	2nd	
2018–19	4	3ª	18th	
2019–20	5	1ª Aut.	4th	
2020–21	5	1ª Aut.	1st	
2021–22	5	3ª RFEF	8th	
2022–23	5	3ª Fed.	10th	
2023–24	5	3ª Fed.	15th	
2024–25	6	1ª Aut.	2nd	
2025–26	5	3ª Fed.	8th	
2026–27	5	3ª Fed.		

- 2 seasons in Tercera División
- 5 seasons in Tercera Federación/Tercera División RFEF
