= CD Son Cladera =

Son Cladera
- Full name: Club Deportivo Son Cladera
- Founded: 1983
- Ground: Municipal de Son Cladera, Palma de Mallorca, Balearic Islands, Spain
- Capacity: 1,500
- President: Marcos Vidal
- Manager: Felix Garcia
- League: División de Honor – Mallorca
- 2025–26: Tercera Federación – Group 11, 14th of 18 (relegated)
Home colours	Away colours

Club Deportivo Son Cladera is a Spanish football team based in the town of Palma de Mallorca, in the autonomous community of the Balearic Islands. Founded in 1983, they play in División de Honor – Mallorca, holding home matches at Estadio Municipal de Son Cladera, with a capacity of 1,500 people.

== Season to season ==
Season	Tier	Division	Place	Copa del Rey
1990–91	8	3ª Reg.	5th	
1991–92	8	3ª Reg.	6th	
1992–93	8	3ª Reg.	1st	
1993–94	7	2ª Reg.	8th	
1994–95	7	2ª Reg.	5th	
1995–96	7	2ª Reg.	14th	
1996–97	7	2ª Reg.	17th	
1997–98	8	3ª Reg.	3rd	
1998–99	7	2ª Reg.	5th	
1999–2000	7	2ª Reg.	7th	
2000–01	7	2ª Reg.	4th	
2001–02	7	2ª Reg.	3rd	
2002–03	6	1ª Reg.	10th	
2003–04	6	1ª Reg.	16th	
2004–05	7	2ª Reg.	9th	
2005–06	7	2ª Reg.	8th	
2006–07	7	2ª Reg.	9th	
2007–08	7	2ª Reg.	13th	
2008–09	7	2ª Reg.	8th	
2009–10	7	2ª Reg.	14th	

Season	Tier	Division	Place	Copa del Rey
2010–11	7	2ª Reg.	4th	
2011–12	6	1ª Reg.	12th	
2012–13	6	1ª Reg.	3rd	
2013–14	5	Reg. Pref.	6th	
2014–15	4	3ª	18th	
2015–16	5	Reg. Pref.	4th	
2016–17	4	3ª	14th	
2017–18	4	3ª	10th	
2018–19	4	3ª	19th	
2019–20	5	Reg. Pref.	14th	
2020–21	5	Reg. Pref.	5th	
2021–22	6	Reg. Pref.	13th	
2022–23	6	Reg. Pref.	4th	
2023–24	6	Reg. Pref.	2nd	
2024–25	6	Div. Hon.	3rd	
2025–26	5	3ª Fed.		

- 4 seasons in Tercera División
- 1 season in Tercera Federación
