= CD Atlético Mansillés =

Association football club in Spain

Atlético Mansillés
- Full name: Club Deportivo Atlético Mansillés
- Founded: 2008
- Ground: La Caldera, Mansilla de las Mulas, Castile and León, Spain
- Capacity: 1,000
- President: Luis Pacios
- Manager: José Ángel Montaña
- League: Tercera Federación – Group 8
- 2025–26: Tercera Federación – Group 8, 6th of 18
Home colours	Away colours

Club Deportivo Atlético Mansillés is a Spanish football team based in Mansilla de las Mulas, León, in the autonomous community of Castile and León. Founded in 1953, they play in Tercera Federación – Group 8, holding home matches at Campo Municipal La Caldera, with a capacity of 1,000 people.

== History ==
Atlético Mansillés were founded in 2008 by a group of friends, who wanted to play football in the city. After playing for four years in the Liga de la Amistad, an amateur competition, the club was inscribed in the Segunda Provincial in 2012.

Mansillés would achieve promotions in 2014 and 2020, before reaching Tercera Federación in June 2024. Their president Luis Pacios is also a footballer at the club, and plays as a midfielder.

== Season to season ==
Season	Tier	Division	Place	Copa del Rey
2012–13	7	2ª Prov.	8th	
2013–14	7	2ª Prov.	4th	
2014–15	6	1ª Prov.	8th	
2015–16	6	1ª Prov.	13th	
2016–17	6	1ª Prov.	11th	
2017–18	6	1ª Prov.	8th	
2018–19	6	1ª Prov.	2nd	
2019–20	6	1ª Prov.	1st	
2020–21	5	1ª Reg.	7th	
2021–22	6	1ª Reg.	4th	
2022–23	6	1ª Reg.	8th	
2023–24	6	1ª Reg.	2nd	
2024–25	5	3ª Fed.	15th	
2025–26	5	3ª Fed.	6th	
2026–27	5	3ª Fed.		

- 3 seasons in Tercera Federación
