= UC Cartes =

Association football club in Spain

- Full name: Unión Club Cartes
- Founded: 1921
- Ground: Campo de Fútbol El Ansar; Cantabria, Spain
- Capacity: 1,000
- Chairman: José Gómez Crespo
- Manager: Andrés Revuelta Soto
- League: Regional Preferente
- 2025–26: Tercera Federación – Group 3, 15th of 18 (relegated)
Home colours	Away colours

Unión Club Cartes is a Spanish football team located in Cartes, in the autonomous community of Cantabria. Founded in 1921 it currently plays in Regional Preferente, holding home matches at Campo de Fútbol El Ansar with a capacity of 1,000 spectators.

== History ==
UC Cartes was founded in 1921.

=== Club background ===
- Unión Club Cartes – (1921–1956)
- Soldevilla Unión Club Cartes – (1956–1970)
- Unión Club Cartes – (1970–present)

== Season to season ==
Season	Tier	Division	Place	Copa del Rey
1930–31	6	3ª Reg.	2nd	
1931–32	6	3ª Reg.	3rd	
1932–33	6	3ª Reg.	2nd	
1933–34	DNP			
1934–35	DNP			
1935–36	6	3ª Reg.	6th	
1936–1941	DNP			
1945–46	6	3ª Reg.	1st	
1946–47	6	3ª Reg.	1st	
1947–48	5	2ª Reg.	5th	
1948–49	5	2ª Reg.	2nd	
1949–50	5	2ª Reg.	5th	
1950–51	5	3ª Reg.	3rd	
1951–52	5	3ª Reg.	6th	
1952–53	5	3ª Reg.	(R)	
1953–54	5	3ª Reg.	1st	
1954–55	5	2ª Reg.	5th	
1955–56	6	3ª Reg.	1st	
1956–57	4	1ª Reg.	10th	
1957–58	5	2ª Reg.	7th	

Season	Tier	Division	Place	Copa del Rey
1958–59	5	2ª Reg.	7th	
1959–60	5	2ª Reg.	3rd	
1960–61	4	1ª Reg.	9th	
1961–62	4	1ª Reg.	15th	
1962–63	4	1ª Reg.	8th	
1963–64	4	1ª Reg.	8th	
1964–65	4	1ª Reg.	8th	
1965–66	4	1ª Reg.	10th	
1966–67	4	1ª Reg.	4th	
1967–68	4	1ª Reg.	9th	
1968–69	5	2ª Reg.	4th	
1969–70	4	1ª Reg.	16th	
1970–71	6	3ª Reg.	4th	
1971–72	6	3ª Reg.	5th	
1972–73	5	2ª Reg.	7th	
1973–74	5	2ª Reg.	12th	
1974–75	5	1ª Reg.	12th	
1975–76	5	1ª Reg.	10th	
1976–77	5	1ª Reg.	14th	
1977–78	6	1ª Reg.	17th	

Season	Tier	Division	Place	Copa del Rey
1978–79	7	2ª Reg.	5th	
1979–80	6	1ª Reg.	13th	
1980–81	6	1ª Reg.	12th	
1981–82	6	1ª Reg.	6th	
1982–83	6	1ª Reg.	11th	
1983–84	6	1ª Reg.	4th	
1984–85	6	1ª Reg.	4th	
1985–86	6	1ª Reg.	4th	
1986–87	5	Reg. Pref.	17th	
1987–88	5	Reg. Pref.	6th	
1988–89	5	Reg. Pref.	15th	
1989–90	5	Reg. Pref.	12th	
1990–91	5	Reg. Pref.	19th	
1991–92	6	1ª Reg.	5th	
1992–93	6	1ª Reg.	4th	
1993–94	5	Reg. Pref.	16th	
1994–95	6	1ª Reg.	6th	
1995–96	6	1ª Reg.	14th	
1996–97	6	1ª Reg.	14th	
1997–98	6	1ª Reg.	14th	

Season	Tier	Division	Place	Copa del Rey
1998–99	6	1ª Reg.	3rd	
1999–2000	5	Reg. Pref.	17th	
2000–01	6	1ª Reg.	9th	
2001–02	6	1ª Reg.	7th	
2002–03	6	1ª Reg.	8th	
2003–04	6	1ª Reg.	5th	
2004–05	6	1ª Reg.	7th	
2005–06	6	1ª Reg.	8th	
2006–07	6	1ª Reg.	13th	
2007–08	6	1ª Reg.	13th	
2008–09	6	1ª Reg.	7th	
2009–10	6	1ª Reg.	3rd	
2010–11	5	Reg. Pref.	18th	
2011–12	6	1ª Reg.	8th	
2012–13	6	1ª Reg.	3rd	
2013–14	5	Reg. Pref.	17th	
2014–15	6	1ª Reg.	16th	
2015–16	6	1ª Reg.	6th	
2016–17	6	1ª Reg.	1st	
2017–18	5	Reg. Pref.	9th	

Season	Tier	Division	Place	Copa del Rey
2018–19	5	Reg. Pref.	2nd	
2019–20	4	3ª	20th	
2020–21	4	3ª	5th / 4th	
2021–22	5	3ª RFEF	10th	
2022–23	5	3ª Fed.	12th	
2023–24	5	3ª Fed.	17th	
2024–25	5	Reg. Pref.	2nd	
2025–26	5	3ª Fed.		

- 2 seasons in Tercera División
- 4 seasons in Tercera Federación/Tercera División RFEF
