= UD Caravaca =

Association football club in Spain

Caravaca
- Full name: Unión Deportiva Caravaca
- Founded: 2015; 11 years ago (as PM CF Caravaca)
- Ground: El Morao
- Capacity: 4,500
- President: Santi Silvar
- Manager: Ranko Despotović
- League: Preferente Autonómica
- 2025–26: Tercera Federación – Group 13, 16th of 18 (relegated)
Home colours	Away colours

Unión Deportiva Caravaca is a football club based in Caravaca de la Cruz, Murcia, Spain. Founded in 2015 as Peña Madridista Club de Fútbol Caravaca, they play in Preferente Autonómica, holding home games at the Estadio Antonio Martínez El Morao, with a capacity of 4,500 people.

== Season to season ==
Season	Tier	Division	Place	Copa del Rey
2015–16	7	2ª Aut.	1st	
2016–17	6	1ª Aut.	8th	
2017–18	6	1ª Aut.	9th	
2018–19	6	1ª Aut.	5th	
2019–20	5	Pref. Aut.	18th	
2020–21	5	Pref. Aut.	1st	
2021–22	5	3ª RFEF	8th	
2022–23	5	3ª Fed.	12th	
2023–24	5	3ª Fed.	5th	
2024–25	5	3ª Fed.	11th	
2025–26	5	3ª Fed.		

- 5 seasons in Tercera Federación/Tercera División RFEF
