= Corvera de Toranzo =

- Municipality
- Coat of arms

- Location of Corvera de Toranzo in Cantabria.

- Location in Spain
- Coordinates: 43°12′37″N 3°56′14″W
- Country: Spain
- Autonomous community: Cantabria
- Province: Cantabria
- Comarca: Valles Pasiegos
- Judicial district: Medio Cudeyo
- Capital: San Vicente de Toranzo

Government
  - Mayor: José Manuel Martínez Penagos (2007) (PP)

Area
  - Total: 49.48 km^{2} (19.10 sq mi)
- Elevation: 168 m (551 ft)

Population (2025-01-01)
  - Total: 2,204
  - Density: 44.54/km^{2} (115.4/sq mi)
- Time zone: UTC+1 (CET)
  - Summer (DST): UTC+2 (CEST)
- Postal code: 39699

Corvera de Toranzo is a municipality located in the autonomous community of Cantabria, Spain. According to the 2007 census, the city has a population of 2,202 inhabitants. Its capital is San Vicente de Toranzo.
