= Mojados =

Coordinates: 41°26′N 4°39′W

Mojados, Spain
- Coat of arms

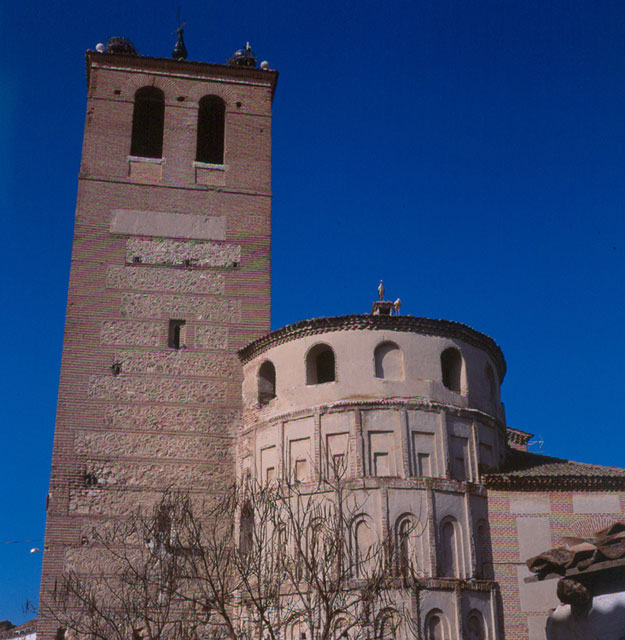
- Church of Santa María
- Country: Spain
- Autonomous community: Castile and León
- Province: Valladolid
- Municipality: Mojados

Area
  - Total: 46 km^{2} (18 sq mi)

Population (2025-01-01)
  - Total: 3,415
  - Density: 74/km^{2} (190/sq mi)
- Time zone: UTC+1 (CET)
  - Summer (DST): UTC+2 (CEST)

Mojados is a municipality located in the Province of Valladolid, Castile and León, Spain. According to the 2004 census (INE), the municipality has a population of 2,959 inhabitants. The town is crossed by the river Cega. There is a bridge over the same six stone arches, built in 1575 by Juan de Nates under command of Philip II. Other attractions include The Mansion House Pin Count of the 15th or 16th century; the parish church of Santa Maria of the 14th-15th century and the Church of San Juan 13th-14th century, both in style Mudejar; and the 14th-century episcopal palace.
