= Torreperogil =

- Municipality
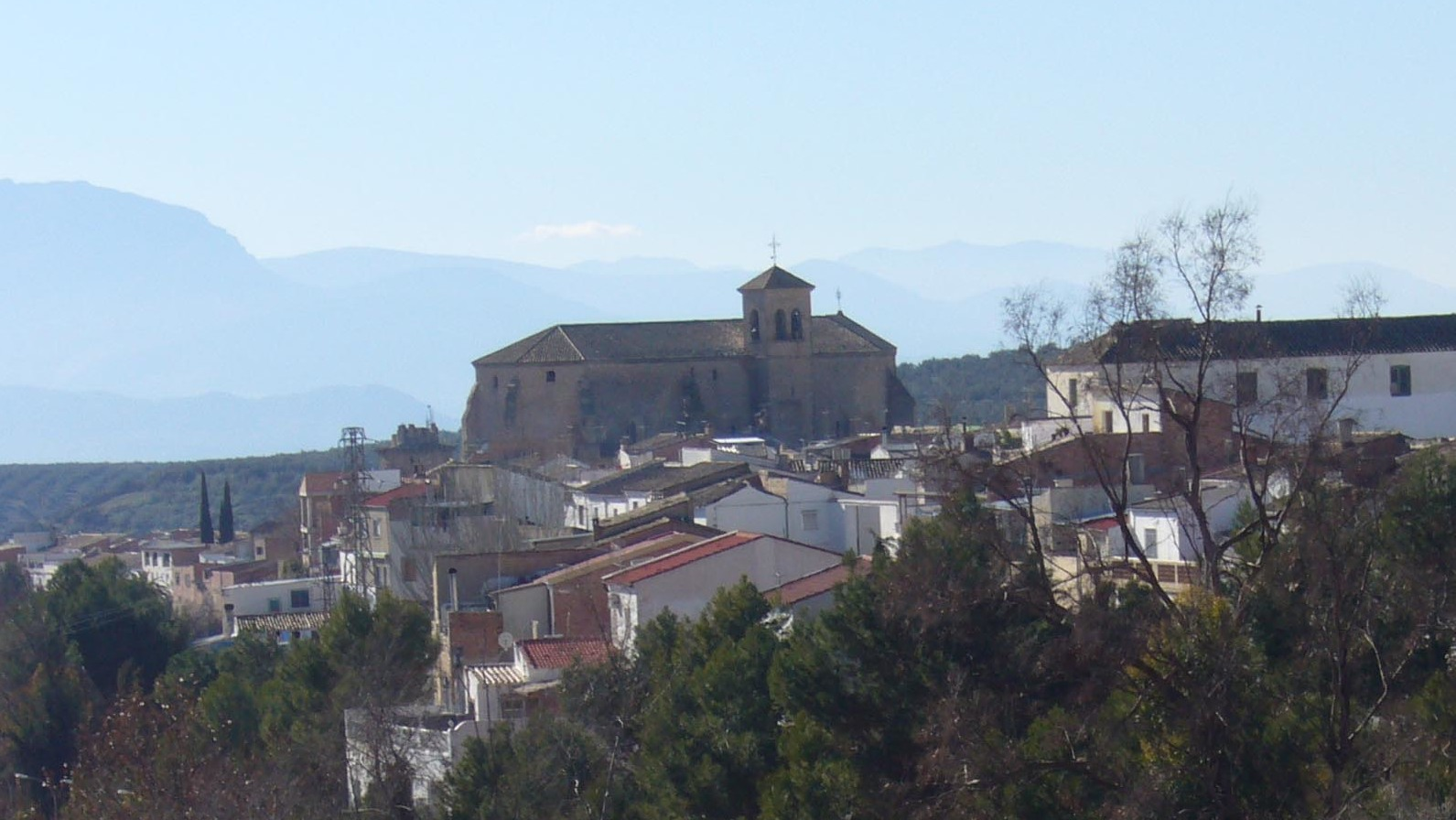

- Flag Coat of arms

- Location in the Province of Jaén Torreperogil (Andalusia) Torreperogil (Spain)
- Coordinates: 38°2′30″N 3°17′04″W
- Country: Spain
- Autonomous community: Andalusia
- Province: Jaén
- Comarca: La Loma de Úbeda
- Judicial district: Úbeda

Government
  - Mayor: José Ruiz Villar (PSOE)

Area
  - Total: 90.1 km^{2} (34.8 sq mi)
- Elevation: 755 m (2,477 ft)

Population (2025-01-01)
  - Total: 7,107
  - Density: 78.9/km^{2} (204/sq mi)
- Demonym(s): Torreño/a; Perogilense
- Time zone: UTC+1 (CET)
  - Summer (DST): UTC+2 (CEST)
- Postal code: 23320
- Official language(s): Spanish
- Website: Official website

Torreperogil is a town of over 7,500 inhabitants in Province of Jaén, Andalucia, Spain. Their people in the "comarca" (region) are known by the use of the exclamatory phrase "¡Bárcia!". Other places in this municipality are El Paso, Los Pinos, the square El Prado from which the Cazorla Mountains are visible, and Las Torres Oscuras, the oldest part of the town, with architecture of the Middles Ages. It is also the location of several non-permanent events.

== History ==
The town was founded by a knight called Pero Xil when in the 13th century he built a tower. The town grew up around this tower. Pero Xil was an example of the Cristian Knight powerful who lived in La Loma de Úbeda. Pero Xil collaborated in the conquest of Ubeda under the orders of Ferdinand III of Castile in 1231.

The Xil family governed the town until 1369. During the Castilian Civil War in the 14th century, The IV lord Gil supported King Pedro I de Castilla, due to Peter the Cruel being killed by his half-brother and candidate to the throne of Castille Enrique II, Lord Gil died in Montiel with Peter the Cruel. As a reward for Ubeda's Knights who supported Enrique II, Enrique II gave control of the town to Úbeda.

Torreperogil became independent of Úbeda in 1639. This independence was given by king Felipe IV.

During the following centuries, the historical district was consolidated. In the 19th century, the town had an urban expansion through new construction: The Paseo del Prado.

Torreperogil was famous in the fight against the French during the Spanish Independence War in 1808. Torreperogil was the first town that proclaimed Alfonso XII at the end of the century.

== Elections ==
In the 2023 municipal elections, the PSOE retained control by winning 7 of the 15 council seats.

== See also ==
- List of municipalities in Jaén
