= 2025 Tercera Federación play-offs =

The 2025 Tercera Federación play-offs to Segunda Federación from Tercera Federación (promotion play-offs) are the final play-offs for the promotion from 2024–25 Tercera Federación to 2025–26 Segunda Federación.

== Format ==
Group champions will be promoted directly to the Segunda Federación. Due to the remodeling of the RFEF leagues, as of 2021–22 season the promotion play-off is divided into two stages: regional and national. Four teams from each group participate in the regional stage, which were classified between places second and fifth of the regular season. Since 2022–23 season the regional stage is a series of two matches. The second classified will face the fifth classified; and the third will do the same with the fourth. The winners of the two series will play a series to determine the team that will qualify for the national stage.

In the regional phase, if the aggregated score ends in a draw, extra time will be played, if the same result is maintained at the end of extra time, the best seeded team will win.

The national stage will be played by 18 teams, which won their respective regional play-offs. Since 2022–23 season nine different series will be played to determine the winners of the promotion to Segunda Federación.

As 2022–23 season, the RFEF recovered the two-legged knockout system, due to the complaints filed against the single knockout system at a neutral venue that had been implemented after COVID-19 and the subsequent reform of the football leagues organized by the RFEF.

== Qualified teams ==
| Group 1 | | Group 2 | | Group 3 | | Group 4 | | Group 5 | | Group 6 | |
|---|---|---|---|---|---|---|---|---|---|---|---|
| 2nd | Estradense | 2nd | Caudal | 2nd | Tropezón | 2nd | Portugalete | 2nd | Atlètic Lleida | 2nd | Roda |
| 3rd | **Sarriana** | 3rd | Covadonga | 3rd | Atlético Albericia | 3rd | Leioa | 3rd | **Girona B** | 3rd | La Nucía |
| 4th | Racing Villalbés | 4th | Sporting Atlético | 4th | Cayón | 4th | **Beasain** | 4th | Peralada | 4th | Castellonense |
| 5th | Noia | 5th | **Lealtad** | 5th | Castro | 5th | Deusto | 5th | Badalona | 5th | Utiel |
| Group 7 | | Group 8 | | Group 9 | | Group 10 | | Group 11 | | Group 12 | |
| 2nd | **Rayo Vallecano B** | 2nd | Atlético Tordesillas | 2nd | **Jaén** | 2nd | Ciudad de Lucena | 2nd | Constància | 2nd | San Fernando |
| 3rd | Torrejón | 3rd | **Burgos Promesas** | 3rd | Motril | 3rd | Utrera | 3rd | Formentera | 3rd | Tamaraceite |
| 4th | Villaverde San Andrés | 4th | Arandina | 4th | Torre del Mar | 4th | Atlético Central | 4th | **Porreres** | 4th | Ibarra |
| 5th | Galapagar | 5th | Mirandés B | 5th | Huétor Tájar | 5th | Tomares | 5th | Penya Independent | 5th | Mensajero |
| Group 13 | | Group 14 | | Group 15 | | Group 16 | | Group 17 | | Group 18 | |
| 2nd | Cieza | 2nd | Azuaga | 2nd | Valle de Egüés | 3rd | Varea | 2nd | Huesca B | 2nd | Atlético Albacete |
| 3rd | Unión Molinense | 3rd | Jaraíz | 3rd | San Juan | 4th | Arnedo | 3rd | Cuarte | 3rd | Toledo |
| 4th | Santomera | 4th | Llerenense | 4th | Cortes | 5th | Oyonesa | 4th | Atlético Monzón | 4th | Villacañas |
| 6th | Atlético Pulpileño (Note: Atlético Pulpileño qualified for the play-off, because Águilas B is ineligible for promotion, as their parent club, Águilas, will participate in the 2025–26 Segunda Federación.) | 5th | Badajoz | 5th | Peña Sport | 6th | La Calzada (Note: La Calzada qualified for the play-off, because UD Logroñés B is ineligible for promotion, as their parent club, UD Logroñés, will participate in the 2025–26 Segunda Federación.) | 5th | Binéfar | 5th | **Socuéllamos** |

- Teams in **bold** promoted to the Segunda Federación
- Teams in italics progressed to the national stage

== Regional stage ==
=== Group 1 – Galicia ===
Semi–finals
2 | Estradense | 1 | 2 | 3
5 | Noia | 1 | 0 | 1
3 | Sarriana | 1 | 0 | 1 (seed)
4 | Racing Villalbés | 0 | 1 | 1

Final
2 | Estradense | 0 | 0 | 0
3 | Sarriana | 2 | 2 | 4

=== Group 2 – Asturias ===
Semi–finals
2 | Caudal | 2 | 1 | 3
5 | Lealtad | 1 | 3 | 4
3 | Covadonga | 0 | 0 | 0
4 | Sporting Atlético | 2 | 1 | 3

Final
5 | Lealtad | 1 | 1 | 2
4 | Sporting Atlético | 1 | 0 | 1

=== Group 3 – Cantabria ===
Semi–finals
2 | Tropezón | 1 | 2 | 3
5 | Castro | 0 | 0 | 0
3 | Atlético Albericia | 1 | 2 | 3
4 | Cayón | 2 | 3 | 5

Final
2 | Tropezón | 1 | 1 | 2
4 | Cayón | 1 | 2 | 3 (a.e.t.)

=== Group 4 – Basque Country ===
Semifinals
2 | Portugalete | 1 | 1 | 2
5 | Deusto | 1 | 0 | 1
3 | Leioa | 0 | 1 | 1
4 | Beasain | 1 | 3 | 4

Finals
2 | Portugalete | 1 | 0 | 1
4 | Beasain | 1 | 1 | 2

=== Group 5 – Catalonia ===
Semi–finals
2 | Atlètic Lleida | 2 | 0 | 2
5 | Badalona | 2 | 1 | 3
3 | Girona B | 1 | 2 | 3
4 | Peralada | 0 | 1 | 1

Final
5 | Badalona | 1 | 0 | 1
3 | Girona B | 3 | 0 | 3

=== Group 6 – Valencian Community ===
Semi–finals
2 | Roda | 1 | 0 | 1
5 | Utiel | 2 | 0 | 2
3 | La Nucía | 0 | 1 | 1
4 | Castellonense | 0 | 2 | 2

Final
5 | Utiel | 1 | 1 | 2
4 | Castellonense | 1 | 1 | 2 (seed)

=== Group 7 – Community of Madrid ===
Semi–finals
2 | Rayo Vallecano B | 3 | 0 | 3
5 | Galapagar | 1 | 0 | 1
3 | Torrejón | 0 | 0 | 0 (seed)
4 | Villaverde San Andrés | 0 | 0 | 0

Final
2 | Rayo Vallecano B | 1 | 3 | 4 (a.e.t.)
3 | Torrejón | 1 | 2 | 3

=== Group 8 – Castile and León ===
Semi–finals
2 | Atlético Tordesillas | 1 | 0 | 1 (seed)
5 | Mirandés B | 1 | 0 | 1
3 | Burgos Promesas | 0 | 3 | 3
4 | Arandina | 0 | 1 | 1

Final
2 | Atlético Tordesillas | 0 | 3 | 3
3 | Burgos Promesas | 3 | 1 | 4

=== Group 9 – Eastern Andalusia ===
Semi–finals
2 | Jaén | 0 | 1 | 1 (seed)
5 | Huétor Tájar | 0 | 1 | 1
3 | Motril | 0 | 0 | 0
4 | Torre del Mar | 2 | 0 | 2

Final
2 | Jaén | 0 | 3 | 3
4 | Torre del Mar | 1 | 0 | 1

=== Group 10 – Western Andalusia ===
Semi–finals
2 | Ciudad de Lucena | 1 | 2 | 3
5 | Tomares | 0 | 0 | 0
3 | Utrera | 0 | 1 | 1
4 | Atlético Central | 1 | 1 | 2 (a.e.t.)

Final
2 | Ciudad de Lucena | 1 | 0 | 1
4 | Atlético Central | 2 | 0 | 2

=== Group 11 – Balearic Islands ===
Semi–finals
2 | Constància | 1 | 0 | 1
5 | Penya Independent | 1 | 1 | 2
3 | Formentera | 0 | 0 | 0
4 | Porreres | 1 | 2 | 3

Final
5 | Penya Independent | 0 | 1 | 1
4 | Porreres | 0 | 1 | 1 (seed)

=== Group 12 – Canary Islands ===
Semi–finals
2 | San Fernando | 1 | 2 | 3 (a.e.t.)
5 | Mensajero | 1 | 0 | 1
3 | Tamaraceite | 0 | 3 | 3
4 | Ibarra | 1 | 0 | 1

Final
2 | San Fernando | 1 | 0 | 1 (seed)
3 | Tamaraceite | 1 | 0 | 1

=== Group 13 – Region of Murcia ===
Semi–final
2 | Cieza | 0 | 1 | 1
6 | Atlético Pulpileño | 1 | 1 | 2
3 | Unión Molinense | 0 | 1 | 1
4 | Santomera | 0 | 2 | 2

Final
6 | Atlético Pulpileño | 0 | 1 | 1
4 | Santomera | 0 | 0 | 0

=== Group 14 – Extremadura ===
Semi–finals
2 | Azuaga | 0 | 1 | 1
5 | Badajoz | 0 | 4 | 4
3 | Jaraíz | 1 | 1 | 2
4 | Llerenense | 2 | 2 | 4

Final
5 | Badajoz | 1 | 0 | 1
4 | Llerenense | 0 | 2 | 2

=== Group 15 – Navarre ===
Semi–finals
2 | Valle de Egüés | 0 | 1 | 1
5 | Peña Sport | 1 | 1 | 2
3 | San Juan | 1 | 0 | 1
4 | Cortes | 1 | 1 | 2 (a.e.t.)

Final
5 | Peña Sport | 2 | 0 | 2
4 | Cortes | 0 | 3 | 3 (a.e.t.)

=== Group 16 – La Rioja ===
Semi–finals
3 | Varea | 1 | 3 | 4 (a.e.t.)
6 | La Calzada | 0 | 2 | 2
4 | Arnedo | 0 | 1 | 1
5 | Oyonesa | 2 | 2 | 4

Final
3 | Varea | 0 | 1 | 1
5 | Oyonesa | 0 | 0 | 0

=== Group 17 – Aragon ===
Semi–finals
2 | Huesca B | 2 | 2 | 4
5 | Binéfar | 4 | 1 | 5
3 | Cuarte | 0 | 2 | 2
4 | Atlético Monzón | 1 | 3 | 4

Final
5 | Binéfar | 2 | 0 | 2
4 | Atlético Monzón | 5 | 1 | 6

=== Group 18 Castilla–La Mancha ===
Semi–finals
2 | Atlético Albacete | 0 | 1 | 1
5 | Socuéllamos | 1 | 1 | 2
3 | Toledo | 0 | 1 | 1
4 | Villacañas | 1 | 2 | 3

Final
5 | Socuéllamos | 0 | 2 | 2
4 | Villacañas | 1 | 0 | 1

== National stage ==
=== Qualified teams ===
| Group | Position | Team |
|---|---|---|
| 7 | 2nd | **Rayo Vallecano B** |
| 9 | 2nd | **Jaén** |
| 12 | 2nd | San Fernando |

| Group | Position | Team |
|---|---|---|
| 1 | 3rd | **Sarriana** |
| 5 | 3rd | **Girona B** |
| 8 | 3rd | **Burgos Promesas** |
| 16 | 3rd | Varea |

| Group | Position | Team |
|---|---|---|
| 3 | 4th | Cayón |
| 4 | 4th | **Beasain** |
| 6 | 4th | Castellonense |
| 10 | 4th | Atlético Central |
| 11 | 4th | **Porreres** |
| 14 | 4th | Llerenense |
| 15 | 4th | Cortes |
| 17 | 4th | Atlético Monzón |

| Group | Position | Team |
|---|---|---|
| 2 | 5th | **Lealtad** |
| 18 | 5th | **Socuéllamos** |

| Group | Position | Team |
|---|---|---|
| 13 | 6th | Atlético Pulpileño |

Bold indicates teams that were promoted

=== Matches ===
| Team 1 | Agg. | Team 2 | 1st leg | 2nd leg |
|---|---|---|---|---|
| **Porreres** | 1–1 (5–4 p) | Atlético Monzón | 0–1 | 1–0 |
| Atlético Pulpileño | 2–3 (a.e.t.) | **Sarriana** | 0–0 | 2–3 |
| **Socuéllamos** | 3–1 | Cayón | 1–1 | 2–0 |
| **Girona B** | 3–0 | San Fernando | 1–0 | 2–0 |
| Cortes | 1–4 | **Beasain** | 1–2 | 0–2 |
| Llerenense | 2–3 | **Lealtad** | 1–0 | 1–3 |
| Varea | 1–5 | **Rayo Vallecano B** | 1–2 | 0–3 |
| Atlético Central | 1–3 | **Jaén** | 0–1 | 1–2 |
| Castellonense | 1–1 (5–6 p) | **Burgos Promesas** | 1–0 | 0–1 |

First leg

| 14 June 2025 | **Cortes** | **1–2** | **Beasain** | Cortes |
| 18:00 UTC+2 | Puertas 6' (pen.) | Report | Bengoetxea 41'; Pita 61' | Stadium: San Francisco Javier; Referee: Juan Casaucau Posadas |

| 14 June 2025 | **Castellonense** | **1–0** | **Burgos Promesas** | Castelló |
| 19:00 UTC+2 | Lidón 44' | Report | | Stadium: Antonio Escuriet; Referee: Josep Ollé Lladó |

| 15 June 2025 | **Girona B** | **1–0** | **San Fernando** | Riudarenes |
| 11:00 UTC+2 | Camara 4' | Report | | Stadium: Municipal de Riudarenes; Referee: Francisco Ortiz Escarrer |

| 15 June 2025 | **Socuéllamos** | **1–1** | **Cayón** | Socuéllamos |
| 12:00 UTC+2 | Yemoh 22' | Report | Chus Laredo 51' | Stadium: Paquito Jiménez; Referee: David Menacho Gómez |

| 15 June 2025 | **Porreres** | **0–1** | **Atlético Monzón** | Porreres |
| 12:00 UTC+2 | | Report | Ouakkati 15' | Stadium: Ses Forques; Referee: Miguel Gómez Blázquez |

| 15 June 2025 | **Varea** | **1–2** | **Rayo Vallecano B** | Logroño |
| 12:00 UTC+2 | Ubis 65' (pen.) | Report | Eto'o 26', 76' | Stadium: Ángel Aguado; Referee: Joel García Rubio |

| 15 June 2025 | **Atlético Pulpileño** | **0–0** | **Sarriana** | Pulpí |
| 19:00 UTC+2 | | Report | | Stadium: San Miguel; Referee: Alejandro Alonso Salcedo |

| 15 June 2025 | **Llerenense** | **1–0** | **Lealtad** | Llerena |
| 19:00 UTC+2 | Cordero 83' | Report | | Stadium: Fernando Robina; Referee: Guillermo Iñigo Hernández |

| 15 June 2025 | **Atlético Central** | **0–1** | **Jaén** | Alcalá de Guadaíra |
| 19:45 UTC+2 | | Report | Lozano 64' | Stadium: Nuevo Estadio Ciudad de Alcalá; Referee: Aridane Hernández Sosa |

Second leg

| 21 June 2025 | **Beasain** | **2–0** | Cortes | Beasain |
| 18:00 UTC+2 | | | | Stadium: Loinaz |

| 21 June 2025 | **Burgos Promesas** | **1–0** (**6–5** p) | Castellonense | Burgos |
| 19:00 UTC+2 | | | | Stadium: El Plantío |

| 22 June 2025 | **Rayo Vallecano B** | **3–0** | Varea | Madrid |
| 10:00 UTC+2 | | | | Stadium: Ciudad Deportiva Rayo Vallecano |

| 22 June 2025 | Cayón | **0–2** | **Socuéllamos** | Santa María de Cayón |
| 12:00 UTC+2 | | | | Stadium: Fernando Astobiza |

| 22 June 2025 | San Fernando | **0–2** | **Girona B** | Maspalomas |
| 12:00 UTC+2 | | | | Stadium: Eleuterio Valerón |

| 22 June 2025 | Atlético Monzón | **0–1** (**4–5** p) | **Porreres** | Monzón |
| 12:00 UTC+2 | | | | Stadium: Isidro Calderón |

| 22 June 2025 | **Lealtad** | **3–1** | Llerenense | Villaviciosa |
| 18:00 UTC+2 | | | | Stadium: Las Callejas |

| 22 June 2025 | **Sarriana** | **3–2 (a.e.t.)** | Atlético Pulpileño | Sarria |
| 19:00 UTC+2 | | | | Stadium: A Ribela |

| 22 June 2025 | **Jaén** | **2–1** | Atlético Central | Jaén |
| 20:00 UTC+2 | | | | Stadium: Nuevo Estadio de La Victoria |

== Promoted teams ==
- The 18 teams that were promoted through regular season groups are included.
- The number of years after the last participation of the club in the fourth tier is referred to the previous appearance at that level. Depending on the time, it could have been Divisiones Regionales (until 1977), Tercera División (1977–2021) or Segunda Federación (2021–present).

Promoted to Segunda Federación
| Alcalá (4 years later) | Atlético Astorga (4 years later) | Atlético Malagueño (4 years later) | Basconia (4 years later) | Beasain (2 years later) | Burgos Promesas (2 years later) | Castellón B (16 years later) | Ebro (2 years later) | Extremadura (First time ever) |
| Girona B (4 years later) | Jaén (4 years later) | Las Palmas Atlético (3 years later) | Lealtad (4 years later) | Lorca Deportiva (5 years later) | Mutilvera (1 year later) | Náxara (1 year later) | UD Ourense (4 years later) | Oviedo Vetusta (1 year later) |
| Poblense (5 years later) | Porreres (First time ever) | Puente Genil (4 years later) | Quintanar del Rey (4 years later) | Rayo Vallecano B (4 years later) | Reus FCR (57 years later) | Sámano (4 years later) | Sarriana (First time ever) | Socuéllamos (2 years later) |
