= 2024–25 Tercera Federación =

Tercera Federación
- Season: 2024–25
- Dates: 6 September 2024 – June 2025

The 2024–25 Tercera Federación season is the fourth for the Tercera Federación, the national fifth level in the Spanish football league system. It consists of 17 groups with 18 teams each, and one group with 19 teams.

== Competition format ==
- The group champions will be promoted to 2025–26 Segunda Federación.
- The champion of each group qualified for the 2025–26 Copa del Rey. If the champion is a reserve team, the first non-reserve team qualified will join the Copa.
- Relegations to the regional leagues will depend on which clubs are relegated in the 2024–25 Segunda Federación, as well as the number of the promoted teams for the ensuing season.

== Overview before the season ==
A total of 325 teams made up the league: 27 relegated from the 2023–24 Segunda Federación, 238 retained from the 2023–24 Tercera Federación, and 60 promoted from the regional divisions.

== Groups ==
=== Group 1 – Galicia ===
Teams retained from 2023–24 Tercera Federación

- Alondras
- Arosa
- Atlético Arteixo
- Barbadás
- Betanzos
- Celta C
- Estradense
- UD Ourense
- Polvorín
- Sarriana
- Silva
- Somozas
- Viveiro

Teams relegated from 2023–24 Segunda Federación

- Racing Villalbés
Location of teams of the 2024–25 Tercera Federación Group 1

Teams promoted from 2023–24 Preferente de Galicia

- Boiro
- Noia
- Valladares
- Villalonga

==== Teams and locations ====
Team	City	Home ground
Alondras	Cangas	O Morrazo
Arosa	Vilagarcía de Arousa	A Lomba
Atlético Arteixo	Arteixo	Ponte dos Brozos
Barbadás	Barbadás	Os Carrís
Betanzos	Betanzos	García Hermanos
Boiro	Boiro	Barraña
Gran Peña	Vigo	Barreiro
Estradense	A Estrada	Municipal
Noia	Noia	San Lázaro
Ourense	Ourense	O Couto
Polvorín	Lugo	Anxo Carro
Racing Villalbés	Vilalba	A Magdalena
Sarriana	Sarria	Municipal de Ribela
Silva	A Coruña	A Grela
Somozas	As Somozas	Pardiñas
Valladares	Valadares, Vigo	A Gándara
Villalonga	Vilalonga, Sanxenxo	San Pedro
Viveiro	Viveiro	Cantarrana

==== League table ====
Pos	Team	Pld	W	D	L	GF	GA	GD	Pts	Qualification
1	UD Ourense (C, P)	34	21	11	2	54	20	+34	74	Promotion to Segunda Federación and qualification for Copa del Rey
2	Estradense	34	18	6	10	52	37	+15	60	Qualification for the promotion play-offs
3	Sarriana (P)	34	18	5	11	66	48	+18	59	Qualification for the promotion play-offs
4	Racing Villalbés	34	16	10	8	40	28	+12	58	Qualification for the promotion play-offs
5	Noia	34	14	13	7	42	31	+11	55 (Note: Noia finished ahead of Arosa on head-to-head points: Arosa 0–2 Noia, Noia 0–0 Arosa)	Qualification for the promotion play-offs
6	Arosa	34	15	10	9	58	46	+12	55	
7	Alondras	34	14	10	10	44	40	+4	52	
8	Polvorín	34	12	9	13	43	45	−2	45	
9	Boiro	34	11	11	12	40	39	+1	44	
10	Somozas	34	10	10	14	36	43	−7	40 (Note: Somozas finished ahead of Gran Peña on head-to-head goal difference: Somozas 0–1 Gran Peña, Gran Peña 0–4 Somozas)	
11	Gran Peña	34	9	13	12	44	51	−7	40	
12	Viveiro	34	11	6	17	47	52	−5	39 (Note: Viveiro finished ahead of Silva on head-to-head points: Silva 0–2 Viveiro, Viveiro 2–0 Silva)	
13	Silva	34	9	12	13	40	48	−8	39	
14	Atlético Arteixo	34	9	11	14	40	42	−2	38	
15	Barbadás	34	10	7	17	29	45	−16	37 (Note: Barbadás finished ahead of Valladares on head-to-head points: Barbadás 2–1 Valladares, Valladares 1–1 Barbadás)	
16	Valladares (R)	34	8	13	13	33	52	−19	37	Relegation to Preferente de Galicia
17	Villalonga (R)	34	10	6	18	32	51	−19	36	Relegation to Preferente de Galicia
18	Betanzos (R)	34	6	7	21	29	51	−22	25	Relegation to Preferente de Galicia

Rules for classification: 1) points; 2) head-to-head points; 3) head-to-head goal difference; 4) goal difference; 5) number of goals scored
(C) Champions; (P) Promoted; (R) Relegated

=== Group 2 – Asturias ===
Teams retained from 2023–24 Tercera Federación

- Avilés Stadium
- Caudal
- Ceares
- Colunga
- Condal
- L'Entregu
- Lealtad
- Lenense
- Praviano
- Sporting Atlético
- Titánico
- Tuilla
- Urraca

Teams relegated from 2023–24 Segunda Federación

- Covadonga
- Oviedo Vetusta

Teams promoted from 2023–24 Primera Asturfútbol

- Mosconia
- Roces
- San Martín

==== Teams and locations ====
Location of the 2024–25 Tercera Federación Group 2

Team	City	Home ground
Avilés Stadium	Avilés	Muro de Zaro
Caudal	Mieres	Hermanos Antuña
Ceares	Gijón	La Cruz
Colunga	Colunga	Santianes
Condal	Noreña	Alejandro Ortea
Covadonga	Oviedo	Juan Antonio Álvarez Rabanal
L'Entregu	El Entrego, San Martín del Rey Aurelio	Nuevo Nalón
Lealtad	Villaviciosa	Les Caleyes
Lenense	Pona de Lena	El Sóton
Mosconia	Grado	Marqués de la Vega de Anzo
Oviedo Vetusta	Oviedo	El Requexón
Praviano	Pravia	Santa Catalina
Roces	Gijón	Covadonga
San Martín	Sotrondio, San Martín del Rey Aurelio	El Florán
Sporting Atlético	Gijón	Pepe Ortiz
Titánico	Laviana	Las Tolvas
Tuilla	Tuilla, Langreo	El Candín
Urraca	Posada de Llanes, Llanes	Campo de La Corredoria

==== League table ====
Pos	Team	Pld	W	D	L	GF	GA	GD	Pts	Qualification
1	Oviedo Vetusta (C, P)	34	28	5	1	82	14	+68	89	Promotion to Segunda Federación
2	Caudal	34	23	7	4	67	15	+52	76	Qualification for the promotion play-offs and Copa del Rey
3	Covadonga	34	22	7	5	59	17	+42	73	Qualification for the promotion play-offs
4	Sporting Atlético	34	18	13	3	60	23	+37	67	Qualification for the promotion play-offs
5	Lealtad (P)	34	16	10	8	56	31	+25	58 (Note: Lealtad finished ahead of Mosconia on head-to-head points: Lealtad 1–0 Mosconia, Mosconia 0–1 Lealtad)	Qualification for the promotion play-offs
6	Mosconia	34	16	10	8	45	31	+14	58	
7	L'Entregu	34	14	9	11	44	44	0	51	
8	Praviano	34	10	14	10	32	36	−4	44	
9	Colunga	34	10	11	13	45	43	+2	41	
10	Tuilla	34	11	7	16	31	41	−10	40	
11	Avilés Stadium	34	10	8	16	28	63	−35	38 (Note: Avilés Stadium finished ahead of Ceares on head-to-head points: Avilés Stadium 3–2 Ceares, Ceares 1–1 Avilés Stadium)	
12	Ceares	34	9	11	14	36	44	−8	38	
13	Real Titánico	34	10	6	18	38	56	−18	36	
14	San Martín	34	6	14	14	23	36	−13	32 (Note: San Martín finished ahead of Lenense on head-to-head points: San Martín 2–1 Lenense, Lenense 1–1 San Martín)	
15	Lenense	34	8	8	18	30	63	−33	32	
16	Urraca (R)	34	5	12	17	35	56	−21	27	Relegation to Primera Asturfútbol
17	Condal (R)	34	6	8	20	20	59	−39	26	Relegation to Primera Asturfútbol
18	Roces (R)	34	1	6	27	16	75	−59	9	Relegation to Primera Asturfútbol

Rules for classification: 1) points; 2) head-to-head points; 3) head-to-head goal difference; 4) goal difference; 5) number of goals scored
(C) Champions; (P) Promoted; (R) Relegated

=== Group 3 – Cantabria ===
Teams retained from 2023–24 Tercera Federación

- Atlético Albericia
- Atlético Mineros
- Bezana
- Castro
- Colindres
- Guarnizo
- Naval
- Revilla
- Sámano
- Siete Villas
- Torina
- Tropezón
- Vimenor

Teams relegated from 2023–24 Segunda Federación

- Cayón

Teams promoted from 2023–24 Regional Preferente

- Barquereño
- Barreda
- Gama
- Monte

==== Teams and locations ====
Location of teams of the 2024–25 Tercera Federación Group 3

Team	City	Home ground
Atlético Albericia	Santander	Juan Hormaechea
Atlético Mineros	Puente San Miguel	Reocín
Barreda	Barreda, Torrelavega	Solvay
Barquereño	San Vicente de la Barquera	El Castañar
Bezana	Santa Cruz de Bezana	Municipal
Castro	Castro Urdiales	Mioño
Cayón	Sarón	Fernando Astobiza
Colindres	Colindres	El Carmen
Gama	Bárcena de Cicero	Santa María
Guarnizo	Guarnizo, El Astillero	El Pilar
Monte	Monte, Santander	Monte 1
Naval	Reinosa	San Francisco
Revilla	Revilla, Camargo	El Crucero
Sámano	Sámano, Castro Urdiales	Vallegón
Siete Villas	Castillo Siete Villas, Arnuero	San Pedro
Torina	Bárcena de Pie de Concha	Municipal
Tropezón	Tanos, Torrelavega	Santa Ana
Vimenor	Vioño de Piélagos, Piélagos	La Vidriera

==== League table ====
Pos	Team	Pld	W	D	L	GF	GA	GD	Pts	Qualification
1	Sámano (C, P)	34	20	10	4	52	22	+30	70	Promotion to Segunda Federación and qualification for Copa del Rey
2	Tropezón	34	20	7	7	58	30	+28	67	Qualification for the promotion play-offs
3	Atlético Albericia	34	19	7	8	64	39	+25	64	Qualification for the promotion play-offs
4	Cayón	34	19	5	10	61	41	+20	62	Qualification for the promotion play-offs
5	Castro	34	16	11	7	45	26	+19	59	Qualification for the promotion play-offs
6	Vimenor	34	17	6	11	63	42	+21	57	
7	Bezana	34	15	9	10	46	41	+5	54	
8	Torina	34	14	8	12	49	44	+5	50	
9	Barquereño	34	13	10	11	60	59	+1	49	
10	Guarnizo	34	11	15	8	44	37	+7	48	
11	Revilla	34	12	6	16	46	53	−7	42	
12	Colindres	34	9	9	16	36	53	−17	36 (Note: Colindres finished ahead of Gama on head-to-head points: Gama 1–2 Colindres, Colindres 4–0 Gama)	
13	Gama (R)	34	9	9	16	34	56	−22	36	Relegation to Regional Preferente
14	Atlético Mineros (R)	34	9	8	17	33	58	−25	35	Relegation to Regional Preferente
15	Barreda (R)	34	8	10	16	49	65	−16	34	Relegation to Regional Preferente
16	Naval (R)	34	9	6	19	40	59	−19	33	Relegation to Regional Preferente
17	Siete Villas (R)	34	7	7	20	29	53	−24	28	Relegation to Regional Preferente
18	Monte (R)	34	5	5	24	33	64	−31	20	Relegation to Regional Preferente

Rules for classification: 1) points; 2) head-to-head points; 3) head-to-head goal difference; 4) goal difference; 5) number of goals scored
(C) Champions; (P) Promoted; (R) Relegated

=== Group 4 – Basque Country ===
Teams retained from 2023–24 Tercera Federación

- Alavés C
- Basconia
- Beasain
- Cultural Durango
- Derio
- Deusto
- Lagun Onak
- Leioa
- Padura
- Pasaia
- Portugalete
- San Ignacio
- Touring
- Urduliz

Teams promoted from 2023–24 División de Honor

- Aretxabaleta
- Eibar Urko
- San Viator
- Santurtzi

==== Teams and locations ====
Location of teams of the 2024–25 Tercera Federación Group 4

Team	City	Home ground
Alavés C	Vitoria-Gasteiz	José Luis Compañón
Aretxabaleta	Aretxabaleta	Ibarra
Basconia	Basauri	López Cortázar
Beasain	Beasain	Loinaz
Cultural Durango	Durango	Tabira
Derio	Derio	Ibaiondo
Deusto	Bilbao	Etxezuri
Eibar Urko	Eibar	Unbe
Lagun Onak	Azpeitia	Garmendipe
Leioa	Leioa	Sarriena
Padura	Arrigorriaga	Santo Cristo
Pasaia	Pasaia	Don Bosco
Portugalete	Portugalete	La Florida
San Ignacio	Vitoria-Gasteiz	Adurtzabal
San Viator	Vitoria-Gasteiz	San Viator
Santurtzi	Santurtzi	San Jorge
Touring	Errenteria	Fandería
Urduliz	Urduliz	Iparralde

==== League table ====
Pos	Team	Pld	W	D	L	GF	GA	GD	Pts	Qualification
1	Basconia (C, P)	34	23	7	4	89	32	+57	76	Promotion to Segunda Federación
2	Portugalete	34	19	13	2	66	29	+37	70	Qualification for the promotion play-offs and Copa del Rey
3	Leioa	34	20	6	8	55	34	+21	66	Qualification for the promotion play-offs
4	Beasain (P)	34	19	7	8	53	34	+19	64	Qualification for the promotion play-offs
5	Deusto	34	15	9	10	43	35	+8	54	Qualification for the promotion play-offs
6	Alavés C	34	14	6	14	41	41	0	48 (Note: Alavés C finished ahead of Touring on head-to head points: Alavés C 2–2 Touring, Touring 0–1 Alavés C)	
7	Touring	34	13	9	12	39	45	−6	48	
8	Derio	34	12	11	11	39	39	0	47	
9	Eibar Urko	34	12	10	12	46	51	−5	46	
10	Aretxabaleta	34	12	8	14	40	45	−5	44	
11	Lagun Onak	34	11	9	14	44	49	−5	42 (Note: Lagun Onak finished ahead of San Ignacio on head-to-head goal difference: Lagun Onak 1–2 San Ignacio, San Ignacio 0–5 Lagun Onak)	
12	San Ignacio	34	11	9	14	32	41	−9	42	
13	Cultural Durango	34	9	13	12	43	37	+6	40	
14	Pasaia	34	10	9	15	45	60	−15	39	
15	Santurtzi	34	8	14	12	46	43	+3	38	
16	Urduliz (R)	34	9	9	16	37	56	−19	36	Relegation to División de Honor
17	Padura (R)	34	7	8	19	31	48	−17	29	Relegation to División de Honor
18	San Viator (R)	34	1	5	28	21	91	−70	8	Relegation to División de Honor

Rules for classification: 1) points; 2) head-to-head points; 3) head-to-head goal difference; 4) goal difference; 5) number of goals scored
(C) Champions; (P) Promoted; (R) Relegated

=== Group 5 – Catalonia ===
Location of teams of the 2024–25 Tercera Federación Group 5
Location of teams of the 2024–25 Tercera Federación Group 5 (Province of Barcelona)

Teams retained from 2023–24 Tercera Federación

- Badalona
- Girona B
- Grama
- L'Escala
- L'Hospitalet
- Mollerussa
- Montañesa
- Peralada
- Prat
- Reus FCR
- San Cristóbal
- Tona
- Vilassar de Mar

Teams relegated from 2023–24 Segunda Federación

- Cerdanyola del Vallès
- Manresa

Teams promoted from 2023–24 Lliga Elit

- Atlètic Lleida
- Europa B
- Sabadell B

==== Teams and locations ====
Team	City	Home ground
Atlètic Lleida	Lleida	Ramon Farrús
Badalona	Badalona	Municipal de Badalona
Cerdanyola del Vallès	Cerdanyola del Vallès	Fontetes
Europa B	Barcelona	Nou Sardenya
Girona B	Girona	Torres de Palau
Grama	Santa Coloma de Gramenet	Can Peixauet
L'Escala	L'Escala	Estadi Municipal
L'Hospitalet	L'Hospitalet de Llobregat	Municipal de l'Hospitalet de Llobregat
Manresa	Manresa	Nou Congost
Mollerussa	Mollerussa	Camp Municipal
Montañesa	Barcelona	Nou Barris
Peralada	Peralada	Municipal de Peralada
Prat	El Prat	Sagnier
Reus FCR	Reus	Municipal de Reus
Sabadell B	Sabadell	Pepin Valls
San Cristóbal	Terrassa	Ca n'Anglada
Tona	Tona	Municipal
Vilassar de Mar	Vilassar de Mar	Xevi Ramón

==== League table ====
Pos	Team	Pld	W	D	L	GF	GA	GD	Pts	Qualification
1	Reus FCR (C, P)	34	22	5	7	58	28	+30	71	Promotion to Segunda Federación and qualification for Copa del Rey
2	Atlètic Lleida (Note: Atlètic Lleida purchased the spot formerly held by Lleida CF in 2025–26 Segunda Federación after the latter was relegated for financial reasons) (P)	34	17	10	7	58	30	+28	61	Qualification for the promotion play-offs
3	Girona B (P)	34	15	12	7	60	42	+18	57	Qualification for the promotion play-offs
4	Peralada	34	14	14	6	43	32	+11	56	Qualification for the promotion play-offs
5	Badalona	34	16	7	11	52	40	+12	55	Qualification for the promotion play-offs
6	Tona	34	15	8	11	49	44	+5	53	
7	L'Hospitalet	34	13	13	8	43	32	+11	52	
8	Grama	34	12	11	11	52	47	+5	47	
9	Manresa	34	12	10	12	33	42	−9	46	
10	Europa B	34	12	7	15	45	53	−8	43	
11	L'Escala	34	11	9	14	33	41	−8	42 (Note: L’Escala finished ahead of Cerdanyola del Vallès on head-to-head points: Cerdanyola del Vallès 1–2 L’Escala, L’Escala 2–0 Cerdanyola del Vallès)	
12	Cerdanyola del Vallès	34	11	9	14	35	44	−9	42	
13	Mollerussa	34	11	8	15	53	56	−3	41	
14	Montañesa	34	9	13	12	37	39	−2	40	
15	San Cristóbal	34	10	8	16	26	40	−14	38	
16	Vilassar de Mar	34	8	9	17	27	51	−24	33	
17	Sabadell B (R)	34	7	9	18	39	55	−16	30	Relegation to Lliga Elit
18	Prat (R)	34	5	10	19	28	55	−27	25	Relegation to Lliga Elit

Rules for classification: 1) points; 2) head-to-head points; 3) head-to-head goal difference; 4) goal difference; 5) number of goals scored
(C) Champions; (P) Promoted; (R) Relegated

=== Group 6 – Valencian Community ===
Teams retained from 2023–24 Tercera Federación

- Athletic Torrellano
- Atlético Levante
- Atzeneta
- Castellón B
- Castellonense
- Jove Español
- Ontinyent 1931
- Patacona
- Rayo Ibense (Note: Retained after Gandía's administrative relegation due to debts.)
- Roda
- Soneja
- Utiel
- Villarreal C

Teams relegated from 2023–24 Segunda Federación

- Atlético Saguntino
- La Nucía
Location of teams of the 2024–25 Tercera Federación Group 6

Teams promoted from 2023–24 Lliga Comunitat

- Benidorm
- Crevillente
- Vall de Uxó

==== Teams and locations ====
Team	City	Home ground
Athletic Torrellano	Torrellano, Elche	Municipal
Atlético Levante	Valencia	Ciudad Deportiva de Buñol
Atlético Saguntino	Sagunto	Nou Camp de Morvedre
Atzeneta	Atzeneta d'Albaida	El Regit
Benidorm	Benidorm	Guillermo Amor
Castellonense	Castelló	Camp Municipal de L'Almenà
Castellón B	Castellón	Ciudad Deportiva
Crevillente	Crevillent	Enrique Miralles
Jove Español	San Vicente del Raspeig	Ciudad Deportiva
La Nucía	La Nucía	Camilo Cano
Ontinyent 1931	Ontinyent	El Clariano
Patacona	Alboraya	Municipal
Rayo Ibense	Ibi	Francisco Vilaplana Mariel
Roda	Villarreal	Pamesa Cerámica
Soneja	Soneja	El Arco
Utiel	Utiel	La Celadilla
Vall de Uxó	La Vall d'Uixó	José Mangriñán
Villarreal C	Villarreal	Pamesa Cerámica

==== League table ====
Pos	Team	Pld	W	D	L	GF	GA	GD	Pts	Qualification
1	Castellón B (C, P)	34	18	4	12	76	58	+18	58	Promotion to Segunda Federación
2	Roda	34	15	12	7	52	32	+20	57	Qualification for the promotion play-offs and Copa del Rey
3	La Nucía	34	15	11	8	46	24	+22	56 (Note: La Nucía finished ahead of Castellonense on head-to-head points: La Nucía 1–1 Castellonense, Castellonense 0–2 La Nucía)	Qualification for the promotion play-offs
4	Castellonense	34	15	11	8	38	30	+8	56	Qualification for the promotion play-offs
5	Utiel	34	14	12	8	38	31	+7	54	Qualification for the promotion play-offs
6	Villarreal C	34	12	14	8	55	37	+18	50 (Note: Villarreal C finished ahead of Atzeneta on head-to-head points: Atzeneta 1–1 Villarreal C, Villarreal C 4–0 Atzeneta)	
7	Atzeneta	34	14	8	12	36	34	+2	50	
8	Vall de Uxó	34	13	10	11	37	36	+1	49	
9	Soneja	34	11	14	9	36	34	+2	47	
10	Atlético Saguntino	34	10	16	8	41	36	+5	46	
11	Ontinyent 1931	34	11	12	11	34	35	−1	45	
12	Atlético Levante	34	13	5	16	34	39	−5	44	
13	Jove Español	34	12	7	15	36	46	−10	43	
14	Crevillente	34	10	11	13	34	44	−10	41	
15	Athletic Torrellano	34	8	15	11	35	39	−4	39	
16	Benidorm (R)	34	9	11	14	36	51	−15	38	Relegation to Lliga Comunitat
17	Patacona (R)	34	5	12	17	35	59	−24	27	Relegation to Lliga Comunitat
18	Rayo Ibense (R)	34	6	5	23	23	57	−34	23	Relegation to Lliga Comunitat

Rules for classification: 1) points; 2) head-to-head points; 3) head-to-head goal difference; 4) goal difference; 5) number of goals scored
(C) Champions; (P) Promoted; (R) Relegated

=== Group 7 – Community of Madrid ===
Teams retained from 2023–24 Tercera Federación

- Alcalá
- Alcorcón B
- Canillas
- Collado Villalba
- Galapagar
- Las Rozas
- Leganés B
- México FC
- Parla (Note: Retained after Ursaria suffered administrative relegation but later failed to comply with the requirements to play in the competition.)
- Rayo Vallecano B
- Torrejón
- Tres Cantos
- Trival Valderas
Location of teams of the 2024–25 Tercera Federación Group 7

Teams promoted from 2023–24 Preferente de Madrid

- Aravaca
- Cala Pozuelo
- Carabanchel
- El Álamo
- Villaverde San Andrés

==== Teams and locations ====
Team	City	Home ground
Alcalá	Alcalá de Henares	Municipal del Val
Alcorcón B	Alcorcón	Anexo de Santo Domingo
Aravaca	Madrid	Antonio Sanfiz
Cala Pozuelo	Pozuelo de Alarcón	Municipal El Pradillo
Canillas	Madrid	Canillas
Carabanchel	Madrid	La Mina
Collado Villalba	Collado Villalba	Ciudad Deportiva
El Álamo	El Álamo	Facundo Rivas
Galapagar	Galapagar	El Chopo
Leganés B	Leganés	Instalación Deportiva Butarque
Las Rozas	Las Rozas	Dehesa de Navalcarbón
México FC	Paracuellos de Jarama	Municipal
Parla	Parla	Los Prados
Rayo Vallecano B	Madrid	Ciudad Deportiva
Torrejón	Torrejón de Ardoz	Las Veredillas
Tres Cantos	Tres Cantos	La Foresta A
Trival Valderas	Alcorcón	La Canaleja
Villaverde San Andrés	Madrid	Boetticher

==== League table ====
Pos	Team	Pld	W	D	L	GF	GA	GD	Pts	Qualification
1	Alcalá (C, P)	34	23	6	5	68	32	+36	75	Promotion to Segunda Federación and qualification for Copa del Rey
2	Rayo Vallecano B (P)	34	18	7	9	71	52	+19	61	Qualification for the promotion play-offs
3	Torrejón	34	17	7	10	55	48	+7	58	Qualification for the promotion play-offs
4	Villaverde San Andrés	34	14	12	8	52	37	+15	54 (Note: Head-to-head points: Villaverde San Andrés 6 pts, Galapagar 5 pts, Las Rozas 4 pts)	Qualification for the promotion play-offs
5	Galapagar (Note: Galapagar awarded a 3–0 win in their Round 8 match against Alcorcón B after the latter fielded an ineligible player. The match originally ended 0–1.)	34	14	12	8	45	41	+4	54	Qualification for the promotion play-offs
6	Las Rozas	34	15	9	10	45	42	+3	54	
7	Collado Villalba	34	14	10	10	44	36	+8	52	
8	Leganés B	34	13	12	9	58	38	+20	51	
9	Alcorcón B	34	13	8	13	55	50	+5	47	
10	Trival Valderas	34	12	10	12	47	47	0	46	
11	Tres Cantos	34	12	9	13	43	44	−1	45	
12	México FC	34	11	9	14	35	49	−14	42 (Note: México FC finished ahead of Carabanchel on head-to-head points: Carabanchel 0–0 México FC, México FC 1–0 Carabanchel)	
13	Carabanchel	34	10	12	12	30	29	+1	42	
14	Parla	34	10	8	16	38	58	−20	38 (Note: Parla finished ahead of Cala Pozuelo on head-to-head points: Parla 0–0 Cala Pozuelo, Cala Pozuelo 0–1 Parla)	
15	Cala Pozuelo (Note: Cala Pozuelo awarded a 0–3 win in their Round 10 match against México FC after the latter fielded an ineligible player. The match originally ended 1–1.) (R)	34	10	8	16	42	51	−9	38	Relegation to Primera Autonómica
16	Aravaca (R)	34	9	8	17	42	52	−10	35	Relegation to Primera Autonómica
17	Canillas (R)	34	5	8	21	36	68	−32	23	Relegation to Primera Autonómica
18	El Álamo (R)	34	5	7	22	29	61	−32	22	Relegation to Primera Autonómica

Rules for classification: 1) points; 2) head-to-head points; 3) head-to-head goal difference; 4) goal difference; 5) number of goals scored
(C) Champions; (P) Promoted; (R) Relegated

=== Group 8 – Castile and León ===
Teams retained from 2023–24 Tercera Federación

- Almazán
- Atlético Astorga
- Atlético Bembibre
- Atlético Tordesillas
- Becerril
- Burgos Promesas
- Cristo Atlético
- Júpiter Leonés
- La Virgen del Camino
- Laguna (Note: Retained after winning a court action which kept the group with 19 teams.)
- Mirandés B
- Palencia
- Santa Marta
- Villaralbo

Teams relegated from 2023–24 Segunda Federación

- Arandina

Teams promoted from 2023–24 Primera Regional

- Atlético Mansillés
- Briviesca
- Ciudad Rodrigo
- Mojados

==== Teams and locations ====
Location of teams of the 2024–25 Tercera Federación Group 8

Team	City	Home ground
Almazán	Almazán	La Arboleda
Arandina	Aranda de Duero	El Montecillo
Atlético Astorga	Astorga	La Eragudina
Atlético Bembibre	Bembibre	La Devesa
Atlético Mansillés	Mansilla de las Mulas	La Caldera
Atlético Tordesillas	Tordesillas	Las Salinas
Becerril	Becerril de Campos	Mariano Haro
Briviesca	Briviesca	Municipal
Burgos Promesas	Burgos	Castañares
Ciudad Rodrigo	Ciudad Rodrigo	Francisco Mateos
Cristo Atlético	Palencia	Nueva Balastera
Júpiter Leonés	León	Puente Castro
La Virgen del Camino	La Virgen del Camino, Valverde de la Virgen	Los Dominicos
Laguna	Laguna de Duero	La Laguna
Mirandés B	Miranda de Ebro	Ence
Mojados	Mojados	Campo Municipal
Palencia	Palencia	Nueva Balastera
Santa Marta	Santa Marta de Tormes	Alfonso San Casto
Villaralbo	Villaralbo	Ciudad Deportiva Fernández Garcia

==== League table ====
Pos	Team	Pld	W	D	L	GF	GA	GD	Pts	Qualification
1	Atlético Astorga (C, P)	36	22	9	5	65	25	+40	75	Promotion to Segunda Federación and qualification for Copa del Rey
2	Atlético Tordesillas	36	20	12	4	52	25	+27	72	Qualification for the promotion play-offs
3	Burgos Promesas (P)	36	15	15	6	45	29	+16	60	Qualification for the promotion play-offs
4	Arandina	36	15	13	8	49	35	+14	58	Qualification for the promotion play-offs
5	Mirandés B	36	16	9	11	51	41	+10	57 (Note: Mirandés B finished ahead of La Virgen del Camino on head-to-head goal difference: La Virgen del Camino 1–0 Mirandés B, Mirandés B 3–1 La Virgen del Camino)	Qualification for the promotion play-offs
6	La Virgen del Camino	36	15	12	9	44	30	+14	57	
7	Júpiter Leonés	36	15	10	11	54	43	+11	55	
8	Cristo Atlético	36	13	15	8	53	44	+9	54	
9	Becerril	36	14	9	13	43	50	−7	51	
10	Villaralbo	36	12	14	10	37	27	+10	50	
11	Santa Marta	36	11	15	10	48	41	+7	48	
12	Mojados	36	12	8	16	36	55	−19	44	
13	Almazán	36	9	14	13	44	47	−3	41	
14	Palencia	36	10	10	16	39	40	−1	40	
15	Atlético Mansillés	36	9	11	16	36	39	−3	38 (Note: Atlético Mansillés finished ahead of Atlético Bembibre on head-to-head points: Atlético Mansillés 3–1 Atlético Bembibre, Atlético Bembibre 0–0 Atlético Mansillés)	
16	Atlético Bembibre	36	9	11	16	31	53	−22	38	
17	Briviesca (R)	36	8	8	20	28	56	−28	32	Relegation to Primera Regional
18	Ciudad Rodrigo (R)	36	7	10	19	35	55	−20	31	Relegation to Primera Regional
19	Laguna (R)	36	4	7	25	23	78	−55	19	Relegation to Primera Regional

Rules for classification: 1) points; 2) head-to-head points; 3) head-to-head goal difference; 4) goal difference; 5) number of goals scored
(C) Champions; (P) Promoted; (R) Relegated

=== Group 9 – Eastern Andalusia and Melilla ===
Teams retained from 2023–24 Tercera Federación

- Arenas
- Atlético Malagueño
- Atlético Mancha Real
- Ciudad de Torredonjimeno
- El Ejido
- Huétor Tájar
- Huétor Vega
- Jaén
- Málaga City (Note: Retained after River Melilla and Melilla CD resigned from the spot.)
- Motril
- Polideportivo Almería
- Torre del Mar
- Torreperogil
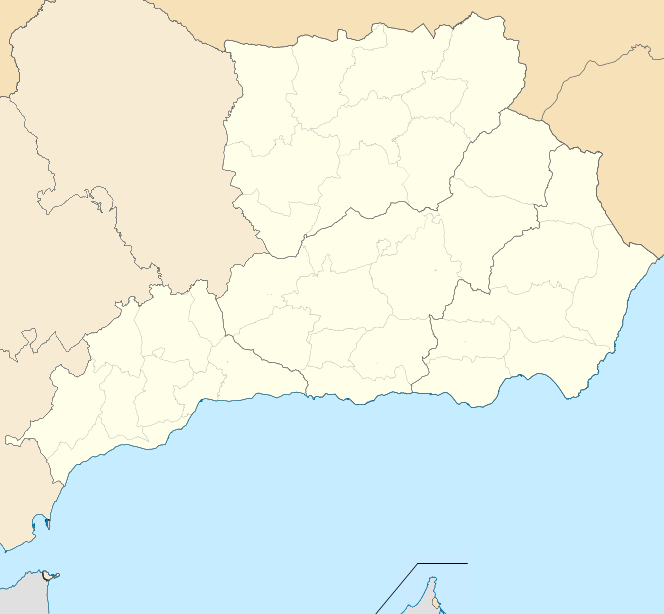
Location of teams of the 2024–25 Tercera Federación Group 9

Teams relegated from 2023–24 Segunda Federación

- El Palo

Teams promoted from 2023–24 División de Honor

- Atlético Porcuna
- Martos
- Mijas-Las Lagunas

Administrative promotion (Note: Vélez (relegated from Segunda Federación) dropped down another category after suffering administrative relegation, and Marbellí bought their place in the division.)

- Marbellí

==== Teams and locations ====
Team	City	Home ground
Arenas	Armilla	Municipal
Atlético Malagueño	Málaga	El Viso
Atlético Mancha Real	Mancha Real	La Juventud
Atlético Porcuna	Porcuna	San Benito
Ciudad de Torredonjimeno	Torredonjimeno	Matías Prats
El Ejido	El Ejido	Santo Domingo
El Palo	Málaga	San Ignacio
Huétor Tájar	Huétor-Tájar	Miguel Moranto
Huétor Vega	Huétor Vega	Las Viñas
Jaén	Jaén	La Victoria
Málaga City	Nerja	Pepe Luis Boadilla
Marbellí	Marbella	Antonio Naranjo
Martos	Martos	Ciudad de Martos
Mijas-Las Lagunas	Las Lagunas, Mijas	Juan Gambero Culebra
Motril	Motril	Escribano Castilla
Polideportivo Almería	Almería	Juventud Campra
Torre del Mar	Torre del Mar	Juan Manuel Azuaga
Torreperogil	Torreperogil	Abdón Martínez Fariñas

==== League table ====
Pos	Team	Pld	W	D	L	GF	GA	GD	Pts	Qualification
1	Atlético Malagueño (C, P)	34	26	5	3	76	22	+54	83	Promotion to Segunda Federación
2	Jaén (P)	34	22	7	5	60	35	+25	73	Qualification for the promotion play-offs and Copa del Rey
3	Motril	34	18	7	9	57	35	+22	61 (Note: Motril finished ahead of Torre del Mar on head-to-head points: Torre del Mar 1–1 Motril, Motril 2–1 Torre del Mar)	Qualification for the promotion play-offs
4	Torre del Mar	34	18	7	9	48	30	+18	61	Qualification for the promotion play-offs
5	Huétor Tájar	34	17	6	11	35	28	+7	57 (Note: Huétor Tájar finished ahead of Huétor Vega on head-to-head points: Huétor Tájar 3–1 Huétor Vega, Huétor Vega 0–0 Huétor Tájar)	Qualification for the promotion play-offs
6	Huétor Vega	34	16	9	9	49	36	+13	57	
7	Mijas-Las Lagunas	34	14	12	8	53	35	+18	54	
8	Torreperogil	34	13	11	10	42	37	+5	50	
9	Atlético Mancha Real	34	13	7	14	37	39	−2	46	
10	Marbellí	34	11	9	14	32	42	−10	42	
11	El Palo	34	10	11	13	36	49	−13	41	
12	Ciudad de Torredonjimeno	34	10	10	14	43	44	−1	40	
13	Arenas	34	9	11	14	40	49	−9	38 (Note: Arenas finished ahead of Martos on head-to-head points: Martos 0–1 Arenas, Arenas 1–1 Martos)	
14	Martos	34	11	5	18	28	41	−13	38	
15	Atlético Porcuna	34	9	9	16	45	55	−10	36	
16	El Ejido (R)	34	7	6	21	36	68	−32	27	Relegation to División de Honor
17	Polideportivo Almería (R)	34	7	2	25	35	75	−40	23	Relegation to División de Honor
18	Málaga City (R)	34	5	6	23	31	63	−32	21	Relegation to División de Honor

Rules for classification: 1) points; 2) head-to-head points; 3) head-to-head goal difference; 4) goal difference; 5) number of goals scored
(C) Champions; (P) Promoted; (R) Relegated

=== Group 10 – Western Andalusia and Ceuta ===
Teams retained from 2023–24 Tercera Federación

- Atlético Espeleño
- Bollullos
- Cartaya
- Ceuta B
- Ciudad de Lucena
- Conil
- Córdoba B
- Coria
- Inter Sevilla (Note: Under the name of Gerena.)
- La Palma
- Pozoblanco
- Puente Genil
- Sevilla C
- Utrera

Teams relegated from 2023–24 Segunda Federación

- San Roque Lepe

Teams promoted from 2023–24 División de Honor

- Atlético Central
- Atlético Onubense
- Tomares

==== Teams and locations ====
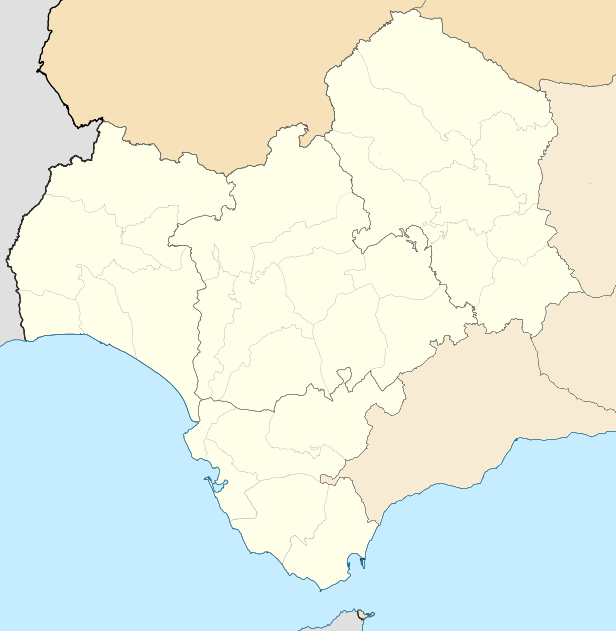
Location of teams of the 2024–25 Tercera Federación Group 10

Team	City	Home ground
Atlético Central	Seville	José Ponce Román
Atlético Espeleño	Espiel	Municipal
Atlético Onubense	Huelva	Ciudad Deportiva
Bollullos	Bollullos Par del Condado	Eloy Ávila Cano
Cartaya	Cartaya	Luis Rodríguez Salvador
Ceuta B	Ceuta	Alfonso Murube
Ciudad de Lucena	Lucena	Ciudad de Lucena
Conil	Conil de la Frontera	José Antonio Pérez Ureba
Córdoba B	Córdoba	Rafael Gómez
Coria	Coria del Río	Guadalquivir
Inter Sevilla	Gines	San José
La Palma	La Palma del Condado	Polideportivo Municipal
Pozoblanco	Pozoblanco	Municipal
Puente Genil	Puente Genil	Manuel Polinario
San Roque Lepe	Lepe	Ciudad de Lepe
Sevilla C	Seville	José Ramón Cisneros Palacios
Tomares	Tomares	Municipal San Sebastián
Utrera	Utrera	San Juan Bosco

==== League table ====
Pos	Team	Pld	W	D	L	GF	GA	GD	Pts	Qualification
1	Puente Genil (C, P)	34	20	11	3	63	24	+39	71	Promotion to Segunda Federación and qualification for Copa del Rey
2	Ciudad de Lucena	34	21	5	8	49	20	+29	68	Qualification for the promotion play-offs
3	Utrera	34	17	9	8	48	26	+22	60	Qualification for the promotion play-offs
4	Atlético Central	34	17	8	9	46	27	+19	59	Qualification for the promotion play-offs
5	Tomares	34	15	10	9	45	32	+13	55	Qualification for the promotion play-offs
6	Bollullos	34	16	6	12	41	34	+7	54	
7	Pozoblanco	34	14	10	10	41	36	+5	52	
8	Atlético Onubense	34	14	8	12	41	35	+6	50	
9	San Roque Lepe	34	12	10	12	29	31	−2	46 (Note: San Roque Lepe finished ahead of Ceuta B on head-to-head points: San Roque Lepe 0–0 Ceuta B, Ceuta B 2–3 San Roque Lepe)	
10	Ceuta B	34	11	13	10	41	38	+3	46	
11	Córdoba B	34	10	15	9	34	36	−2	45	
12	Conil	34	12	8	14	40	39	+1	44	
13	Sevilla C	34	10	11	13	32	40	−8	41	
14	Coria	34	9	9	16	34	48	−14	36	
15	Cartaya (R)	34	8	11	15	31	53	−22	35	Relegation to División de Honor
16	La Palma (R)	34	6	11	17	33	57	−24	29	Relegation to División de Honor
17	Atlético Espeleño (R)	34	5	10	19	30	57	−27	25	Relegation to División de Honor
18	Inter Sevilla (R)	34	3	7	24	25	70	−45	16	Relegation to División de Honor

Rules for classification: 1) points; 2) head-to-head points; 3) head-to-head goal difference; 4) goal difference; 5) number of goals scored
(C) Champions; (P) Promoted; (R) Relegated

=== Group 11 – Balearic Islands ===
Teams retained from 2023–24 Tercera Federación

- Alcúdia
- Binissalem
- Collerense
- Constància
- Felanitx
- Llosetense
- Manacor
- Mercadal
- Platges de Calvià
- Poblense
- Portmany
- Santanyí

Teams relegated from 2023–24 Segunda Federación

- Formentera
- Penya Independent

Teams promoted from 2023–24 Regional Preferente

- Campos
- Migjorn
- Porreres
- Sant Jordi

==== Teams and locations ====
Location of teams of the 2024–25 Tercera Federación Group 11

Team	City	Home ground
Alcúdia	Alcúdia	Els Arcs
Binissalem	Binissalem	Miquel Pons
Campos	Campos	Municipal
Collerense	Es Coll d'en Rabassa, Palma	Ca Na Paulina
Constància	Inca	Municipal
Felanitx	Felanitx	Es Torrentó
Formentera	Sant Francesc Xavier	Municipal
Llosetense	Lloseta	Municipal
Manacor	Manacor	Na Capellera
Mercadal	Es Mercadal	San Martí
Migjorn	Es Migjorn Gran	Los Nogales
Penya Independent	Sant Miquel de Balansat	Municipal
Platges de Calvià	Magaluf, Calvià	Municipal de Magaluf
Poblense	Sa Pobla	Nou Camp
Porreres	Porreres	Ses Forques
Portmany	Sant Antoni de Portmany	Sant Antoni
Sant Jordi	Sant Jordi de ses Salines, Sant Josep de sa Talaia	Kiko Serra
Santanyí	Santanyí	Municipal

==== League table ====
Pos	Team	Pld	W	D	L	GF	GA	GD	Pts	Qualification
1	Poblense (C, P)	34	22	6	6	47	17	+30	72	Promotion to Segunda Federación and qualification for Copa del Rey
2	Constància	34	18	13	3	55	31	+24	67	Qualification for the promotion play-offs
3	Formentera	34	19	9	6	68	34	+34	66	Qualification for the promotion play-offs
4	Porreres (P)	34	17	11	6	51	32	+19	62	Qualification for the promotion play-offs
5	Penya Independent (Note: Penya Independent dissolved prior to the start of the 2025–26 Tercera Federación due to unpaid debts.) (D)	34	17	7	10	56	34	+22	58	Qualification for the promotion play-offs
6	Platges de Calvià	34	14	12	8	51	37	+14	54	
7	Manacor	34	13	12	9	54	36	+18	51	
8	Alcúdia	34	13	8	13	51	53	−2	47 (Note: Alcúdia finished ahead of Binissalem on head-to-head points: Alcúdia 2–1 Binissalem, Binissalem 0–1 Alcúdia)	
9	Binissalem	34	13	8	13	35	34	+1	47	
10	Llosetense	34	12	8	14	47	45	+2	44	
11	Santanyí	34	10	13	11	40	45	−5	43	
12	Mercadal	34	10	10	14	40	43	−3	40 (Note: Mercadal finished ahead of Felanitx on head-to-head points: Felanitx 1–1 Mercadal, Mercadal 7–0 Felanitx)	
13	Felanitx	34	10	10	14	33	50	−17	40	
14	Collerense	34	9	12	13	42	48	−6	39	
15	Portmany	34	8	13	13	43	51	−8	37	
16	Sant Jordi (R)	34	8	6	20	30	52	−22	30	Relegation to Regional
17	Campos (R)	34	4	8	22	31	72	−41	20	Relegation to Regional
18	Migjorn (R)	34	4	4	26	22	82	−60	16	Relegation to Regional

Rules for classification: 1) points; 2) head-to-head points; 3) head-to-head goal difference; 4) goal difference; 5) number of goals scored
(C) Champions; (D) Disqualified; (P) Promoted; (R) Relegated

=== Group 12 – Canary Islands ===
Location of teams of the 2024–25 Tercera Federación Group 12 – Province of Las Palmas
Location of teams of the 2024–25 Tercera Federación Group 12 – Province of Santa Cruz de Tenerife

Teams retained from 2023–24 Tercera Federación

- Arucas
- Buzanada
- Herbania
- Ibarra
- Lanzarote
- Las Palmas Atlético
- Marino
- Panadería Pulido
- San Bartolomé
- Santa Úrsula
- Tamaraceite
- Villa de Santa Brígida

Teams relegated from 2023–24 Segunda Federación

- Mensajero
- San Fernando

Teams promoted from 2023–24 Interinsular Preferente

- Estrella
- Los Llanos de Aridane
- San Miguel
- Unión Viera

==== Teams and locations ====
Team	City	Home ground
Arucas	Arucas	Tonono
Buzanada	Buzanada, Arona	Clementina de Bello
Estrella	Santa Lucía de Tirajana	Las Palmitas
Herbania	Puerto del Rosario	Municipal de Los Pozos
Ibarra	Las Galletas, Arona	Villa Isabel
Lanzarote	Arrecife	Ciudad Deportiva
Las Palmas Atlético	Las Palmas	Anexo Gran Canaria
Los Llanos de Aridane	Los Llanos de Aridane	Aceró
Marino	Los Cristianos, Arona	Antonio Domínguez Alfonso
Mensajero	Santa Cruz de La Palma	Silvestre Carillo
Panadería Pulido	Vega de San Mateo	San Mateo
San Bartolomé	San Bartolomé	Municipal Pedro Espinosa de León
San Fernando	Maspalomas	Ciudad Deportiva
San Miguel	San Miguel de Abona	Paco Tejera
Santa Úrsula	Santa Úrsula	Argelio Tabares
Tamaraceite	Las Palmas	Juan Guedes
Unión Viera	Las Palmas	Alfonso Silva
Villa de Santa Brígida	Santa Brígida	El Guiniguada

==== League table ====
Pos	Team	Pld	W	D	L	GF	GA	GD	Pts	Qualification
1	Las Palmas Atlético (C, P)	34	22	10	2	66	17	+49	76	Promotion to Segunda Federación
2	San Fernando	34	21	10	3	58	20	+38	73	Qualification for the promotion play-offs and Copa del Rey
3	Tamaraceite	34	17	10	7	45	29	+16	61	Qualification for the promotion play-offs
4	Ibarra (Note: Ibarra dissolved prior to the start of the 2025–26 Tercera Federación season due to unpaid debts) (D)	34	18	5	11	49	40	+9	59	Qualification for the promotion play-offs
5	Mensajero	34	16	8	10	50	37	+13	56	Qualification for the promotion play-offs
6	Lanzarote	34	16	7	11	56	33	+23	55	
7	Panadería Pulido	34	13	11	10	45	39	+6	50	
8	Marino	34	12	11	11	43	45	−2	47	
9	Arucas	34	12	9	13	38	36	+2	45 (Note: Arucas finished ahead of San Bartolomé on head-to-head points: San Bartolomé 0–1 Arucas, Arucas 1–0 San Bartolomé)	
10	San Bartolomé	34	10	15	9	43	35	+8	45	
11	Villa Santa Brígida	34	10	11	13	34	42	−8	41	
12	Herbania	34	10	10	14	33	41	−8	40 (Note: Herbania finished ahead of Santa Úrsula on overall goal difference)	
13	Santa Úrsula	34	10	10	14	29	42	−13	40	
14	San Miguel	34	10	7	17	36	54	−18	37	
15	Buzanada (R)	34	9	5	20	27	54	−27	32	Relegation to Interinsular Preferente
16	Estrella (R)	34	7	9	18	30	57	−27	30	Relegation to Interinsular Preferente
17	Los Llanos de Aridane (R)	34	7	8	19	25	49	−24	29	Relegation to Interinsular Preferente
18	Unión Viera (R)	34	3	10	21	28	65	−37	19	Relegation to Interinsular Preferente

Rules for classification: 1) points; 2) head-to-head points; 3) head-to-head goal difference; 4) goal difference; 5) number of goals scored
(C) Champions; (D) Disqualified; (P) Promoted; (R) Relegated

=== Group 13 – Region of Murcia ===
Teams retained from 2023–24 Tercera Federación

- Alcantarilla
- Atlético Pulpileño
- Bullense
- Caravaca
- Cieza
- Deportivo Marítimo (Note: Bought the place of Balsicas Atlético.)
- El Palmar
- Lorca Deportiva
- Muleño
- Murcia Imperial
- Plus Ultra
- UCAM Murcia B
- Unión Molinense

Teams relegated from 2023–24 Segunda Federación

- Cartagena B

Teams promoted from 2023–24 Preferente Autonómica

- Águilas B
- Bala Azul
- Minerva

Administrative promotion (Note: Racing Cartagena Mar Menor suffered administrative relegation due to unpaid fees, and despite Ciudad de Murcia announced that they would remain in the category on 28 June, the RFEF stated that the spot was pending on the deposit of a fee, with Santomera paying an € 63.758,34 fee to buy the spot on 28 July.)

- Santomera

==== Teams and locations ====
Location of teams of the 2024–25 Tercera Federación Group 13

Team	City	Home ground
Águilas B	Águilas	El Rubial
Alcantarilla	Alcantarilla	Ángel Sornichero
Atlético Pulpileño	Pulpí (Andalusia)	San Miguel
Bala Azul	Mazarrón	Playa Sol
Bullense	Bullas	Nicolás de las Peñas
Caravaca	Caravaca de la Cruz	El Morao
Cartagena B	Cartagena	Ciudad Jardín
Cieza	Cieza	La Arboleja
Deportivo Marítimo	Cartagena	Mundial 82
El Palmar	El Palmar, Murcia	Municipal
Lorca Deportiva	Lorca	Francisco Artés Carrasco
Minerva	Alumbres, Cartagena	El Secante
Muleño	Mula	Municipal
Murcia Imperial	Murcia	Campus de Espinardo
Plus Ultra	Llano de Brujas, Murcia	Municipal
Santomera	Santomera	El Limonar
UCAM Murcia B	Sangonera la Verde	El Mayayo
Unión Molinense	Molina de Segura	Sánchez Cánovas

==== League table ====
Pos	Team	Pld	W	D	L	GF	GA	GD	Pts	Qualification
1	Lorca Deportiva (C, P)	34	24	6	4	62	22	+40	78	Promotion to Segunda Federación and qualification for Copa del Rey
2	Cieza	34	21	7	6	73	26	+47	70	Qualification for the promotion play-offs
3	Unión Molinense	34	18	13	3	54	24	+30	67	Qualification for the promotion play-offs
4	Santomera	34	18	8	8	66	42	+24	62 (Note: Santomera finished ahead of Águilas B on head-to-head goal difference: Águilas B 1–0 Santomera, Santomera 2–0 Águilas B)	Qualification for the promotion play-offs
5	Águilas B (Note: Because Águilas has secured qualification to the 2025–26 Segunda Federación, Águilas B is ineligible to participate in the promotion playoffs)	34	18	8	8	52	23	+29	62	
6	Atlético Pulpileño	34	15	10	9	35	23	+12	55	Qualification for the promotion play-offs
7	UCAM Murcia B	34	14	9	11	45	35	+10	51	
8	Murcia Imperial	34	13	10	11	44	31	+13	49	
9	El Palmar	34	12	10	12	48	45	+3	46	
10	Bala Azul	34	10	14	10	34	27	+7	44	
11	Caravaca	34	11	10	13	35	41	−6	43	
12	Deportivo Marítimo	34	10	7	17	38	57	−19	37 (Note: Deportivo Marítimo finished ahead of Muleño on overall goal difference)	
13	Muleño	34	9	10	15	29	49	−20	37	
14	Cartagena B	34	9	9	16	27	43	−16	36	
15	Minerva	34	8	10	16	33	45	−12	34	
16	Bullense (Note: Águilas B awarded a 0–3 win in their Round 18 match against Bullense after the latter fielded an ineligible player. The match had originally ended 1–1.) (R)	34	7	9	18	29	58	−29	30	Relegation to Preferente Autonómica
17	Alcantarilla (R)	34	7	7	20	21	65	−44	28	Relegation to Preferente Autonómica
18	Plus Ultra (R)	34	2	3	29	23	92	−69	9	Relegation to Preferente Autonómica

Rules for classification: 1) points; 2) head-to-head points; 3) head-to-head goal difference; 4) goal difference; 5) number of goals scored
(C) Champions; (P) Promoted; (R) Relegated

=== Group 14 – Extremadura ===
Teams retained from 2023–24 Tercera Federación

- Arroyo
- Atlético Pueblonuevo
- Azuaga
- Calamonte
- Castuera
- Diocesano
- Jaraíz
- Jerez
- Moralo
- Olivenza
- Trujillo
- Villafranca

Teams relegated from 2023–24 Segunda Federación

- Badajoz
- Llerenense
- Montijo

Teams promoted from 2023–24 Primera División Extremeña

- Extremadura
- Puebla de la Calzada
- Santa Amalia

==== Teams and locations ====
Location of teams of the 2024–25 Tercera Federación Group 14

Team	City	Home ground
Arroyo	Arroyo de la Luz	Municipal
Atlético Pueblonuevo	Pueblonuevo del Guadiana	Antonio Amaya
Azuaga	Azuaga	Municipal
Badajoz	Badajoz	Nuevo Vivero
Calamonte	Calamonte	Municipal
Castuera	Castuera	Manuel Ruiz
Diocesano	Cáceres	Campos de La Federación
Extremadura	Almendralejo	Francisco de la Hera
Jaraíz	Jaraíz de la Vera	Municipal
Jerez	Jerez de los Caballeros	Manuel Calzado Galván
Llerenense	Llerena	Fernando Robina
Montijo	Montijo	Municipal
Moralo	Navalmoral de la Mata	Municipal
Olivenza	Olivenza	Municipal
Puebla de la Calzada	Puebla de la Calzada	Municipal
Santa Amalia	Santa Amalia	Municipal
Trujillo	Trujillo	Julián García de Guadiana
Villafranca	Villafranca de los Barros	Municipal

==== League table ====
Pos	Team	Pld	W	D	L	GF	GA	GD	Pts	Qualification
1	Extremadura (C, P)	34	23	6	5	73	22	+51	75	Promotion to Segunda Federación and qualification for Copa del Rey
2	Azuaga	34	20	11	3	65	28	+37	71	Qualification for the promotion play-offs
3	Jaraíz	34	21	6	7	65	40	+25	69	Qualification for the promotion play-offs
4	Llerenense	34	21	5	8	58	28	+30	68	Qualification for the promotion play-offs
5	Badajoz	34	17	12	5	54	20	+34	63	Qualification for the promotion play-offs
6	Diocesano	34	17	7	10	58	38	+20	58	
7	Santa Amalia	34	16	6	12	31	31	0	54	
8	Jerez	34	14	9	11	50	48	+2	51	
9	Villafranca	34	14	5	15	55	55	0	47	
10	Moralo	34	13	7	14	52	50	+2	46	
11	Montijo	34	11	12	11	35	34	+1	45	
12	Atlético Pueblonuevo	34	9	9	16	42	71	−29	36	
13	Calamonte	34	8	9	17	36	48	−12	33	
14	Puebla de la Calzada	34	7	11	16	35	56	−21	32	
15	Castuera (R)	34	7	8	19	46	64	−18	29	Relegation to Regional Preferente
16	Trujillo (Note: Trujillo awarded a 0–3 victory in their Round 20 match against Villafranca after the latter fielded an ineligible player. The match had originally ended 3–1) (R)	34	6	10	18	32	63	−31	28	Relegation to Regional Preferente
17	Arroyo (R)	34	5	7	22	32	70	−38	22	Relegation to Regional Preferente
18	Olivenza (R)	34	3	8	23	26	79	−53	17	Relegation to Regional Preferente

Rules for classification: 1) points; 2) head-to-head points; 3) head-to-head goal difference; 4) goal difference; 5) number of goals scored
(C) Champions; (P) Promoted; (R) Relegated

=== Group 15 – Navarre ===
Location of teams of the 2024–25 Tercera Federación Group 15
Location of teams of the 2024–25 Tercera Federación Group 15 (Cuenca de Pamplona)

Teams retained from 2023–24 Tercera Federación

- Ardoi
- Beti Kozkor
- Beti Onak
- Bidezarra
- Burladés
- Cantolagua
- Cirbonero
- Cortes
- Huarte
- Pamplona
- Peña Sport
- Txantrea

Teams relegated from 2023–24 Segunda Federación

- Mutilvera
- San Juan
- Valle de Egüés

Teams promoted from 2023–24 Primera Autonómica

- Atlético Artajonés
- Gares
- Rotxapea

==== Teams and locations ====
Team	City	Home ground
Ardoi	Zizur Mayor	El Pinar
Atlético Artajonés	Artajona	La Alameda
Beti Kozkor	Lekunberri	Plazaola
Beti Onak	Villava	Lorenzo Goikoa
Bidezarra	Noáin	Municipal El Soto
Burladés	Burlada	Ripagaina
Cantolagua	Sangüesa	Cantolagua
Cirbonero	Cintruénigo	San Juan
Cortes	Cortes	San Francisco Javier
Gares	Puente la Reina	Osabidea
Huarte	Huarte/Uharte	Areta
Mutilvera	Aranguren	Valle Aranguren
Pamplona	Pamplona	Bidezarra
Peña Sport	Tafalla	San Francisco
Rotxapea	Pamplona	La Jaula
San Juan	Pamplona	San Juan
Txantrea	Pamplona	Txantrea
Valle de Egüés	Egüés	Sarriguren

==== League table ====
Pos	Team	Pld	W	D	L	GF	GA	GD	Pts	Qualification
1	Mutilvera (C, P)	34	23	7	4	61	22	+39	76	Promotion to Segunda Federación and qualification for Copa del Rey
2	Valle de Egüés	34	23	6	5	63	21	+42	75	Qualification for the promotion play-offs
3	San Juan	34	18	10	6	56	26	+30	64	Qualification for the promotion play-offs
4	Cortes	34	18	8	8	48	28	+20	62	Qualification for the promotion play-offs
5	Peña Sport	34	15	13	6	55	28	+27	58	Qualification for the promotion play-offs
6	Txantrea	34	16	9	9	58	49	+9	57 (Note: Txantrea finished ahead of Huarte on head-to-head points: Huarte 1–2 Txantrea, Txantrea 1–0 Huarte)	
7	Huarte	34	16	9	9	54	39	+15	57	
8	Ardoi	34	16	7	11	41	30	+11	55	
9	Pamplona	34	13	11	10	45	43	+2	50	
10	Cirbonero	34	11	12	11	46	39	+7	45	
11	Bidezarra	34	10	14	10	39	41	−2	44	
12	Beti Kozkor	34	9	10	15	38	48	−10	37	
13	Atlético Artajonés	34	7	12	15	36	57	−21	33 (Note: Atlético Artajonés finished ahead of Beti Onak on head-to-head goal difference: Atlético Artajonés 3–0 Beti Onak, Beti Onak 2–1 Atlético Artajonés)	
14	Beti Onak	34	9	6	19	32	50	−18	33	
15	Burladés (R)	34	6	8	20	47	73	−26	26	Relegation to Primera Autonómica
16	Rotxapea (R)	34	5	8	21	39	83	−44	23	Relegation to Primera Autonómica
17	Gares (R)	34	5	7	22	25	63	−38	22	Relegation to Primera Autonómica
18	Cantolagua (R)	34	3	9	22	32	75	−43	18	Relegation to Primera Autonómica

Rules for classification: 1) points; 2) head-to-head points; 3) head-to-head goal difference; 4) goal difference; 5) number of goals scored
(C) Champions; (P) Promoted; (R) Relegated

=== Group 16 – La Rioja ===
Teams retained from 2023–24 Tercera Federación

- Arnedo
- Atlético Vianés
- Berceo
- Calahorra B
- Casalarreina
- Comillas (Note: Retained after Racing Rioja disappeared.)
- Haro
- La Calzada
- UD Logroñés B
- Oyonesa
- Peña Balsamaiso
- River Ebro
- Tedeón
- Varea

Teams relegated from 2023–24 Segunda Federación

- Náxara

Teams promoted from 2023–24 Regional Preferente

- Agoncillo
- Autol
- Yagüe

==== Teams and locations ====
Location of teams of the 2024–25 Tercera Federación Group 16

Team	City	Home ground
Agoncillo	Agoncillo	San Roque
Arnedo	Arnedo	Sendero
Atlético Vianés	Viana (Navarre)	Municipal
Autol	Autol	La Manzanera
Berceo	Logroño	La Isla
Calahorra B	Calahorra	La Planilla
Casalarreina	Casalarreina	El Soto
Comillas	Logroño	Mundial 82
Haro	Haro	El Mazo
La Calzada	Santo Domingo de La Calzada	El Rollo
Logroñés B	Logroño	Mundial 82
Náxara	Nájera	La Salera
Oyonesa	Oyón (Basque Country)	El Espinar
Peña Balsamaiso	Logroño	La Estrella
River Ebro	Rincón de Soto	San Miguel
Tedeón	Navarrete	San Miguel
Varea	Varea, Logroño	Municipal
Yagüe	Logroño	El Salvador

==== League table ====
Pos	Team	Pld	W	D	L	GF	GA	GD	Pts	Qualification
1	Náxara (C, P)	34	30	3	1	107	12	+95	93	Promotion to Segunda Federación and qualification for Copa del Rey
2	UD Logroñés B (Note: Because UD Logroñés has assured of qualification to the 2025–26 Segunda Federación, UD Logroñés B will be unable to participate in the promotion playoffs)	34	25	4	5	91	29	+62	79	
3	Varea	34	20	8	6	65	35	+30	68	Qualification for the promotion play-offs
4	Arnedo	34	18	7	9	64	35	+29	61	Qualification for the promotion play-offs
5	Oyonesa	34	16	8	10	52	36	+16	56	Qualification for the promotion play-offs
6	La Calzada	34	15	9	10	45	31	+14	54	Qualification for the promotion play-offs
7	Calahorra B (Note: Because Calahorra was relegated from the 2024–25 Segunda Federación, Calahorra B was also relegated to Regional Preferente) (R)	34	12	13	9	51	43	+8	49	Relegation to Regional Preferente
8	Peña Balsamaiso	34	14	5	15	46	52	−6	47	
9	Yagüe	34	11	12	11	41	66	−25	45	
10	Agoncillo	34	10	12	12	36	44	−8	42	
11	Berceo	34	11	7	16	40	47	−7	40	
12	Comillas	34	11	4	19	40	52	−12	37	
13	Haro	34	9	9	16	32	54	−22	36	
14	Atlético Vianés	34	9	6	19	30	44	−14	33	
15	Autol	34	7	10	17	27	58	−31	31	
16	Casalarreina (R)	34	8	4	22	36	88	−52	28 (Note: Casalarreina finished ahead of River Ebro on head-to-head points: River Ebro 1–2 Casalarreina, Casalarreina 3–1 River Ebro)	Relegation to Regional Preferente
17	River Ebro (R)	34	7	7	20	29	59	−30	28	Relegation to Regional Preferente
18	Tedeón (R)	34	4	10	20	26	73	−47	22	Relegation to Regional Preferente

Rules for classification: 1) points; 2) head-to-head points; 3) head-to-head goal difference; 4) goal difference; 5) number of goals scored
(C) Champions; (P) Promoted; (R) Relegated

=== Group 17 – Aragon ===
Teams retained from 2023–24 Tercera Federación

- Almudévar
- Atlético Monzón
- Belchite 97
- Binéfar
- Calamocha
- Caspe
- Cuarte
- Ebro
- Épila
- Fraga
- Fuentes
- Huesca B
- Tamarite
- Utrillas

Teams relegated from 2023–24 Segunda Federación

- Brea
Location of teams of the 2024–25 Tercera Federación Group 17

Teams promoted from 2023–24 Regional Preferente

- Andorra
- La Almunia
- Zuera

==== Teams and locations ====
Team	City	Home ground
Almudévar	Almudévar	La Corona
Andorra	Andorra	Juan Antonio Endeiza
Atlético Monzón	Monzón	Isidro Calderón
Belchite 97	Belchite	Municipal
Binéfar	Binéfar	Los Olmos
Brea	Brea de Aragón	Piedrabuena
Calamocha	Calamocha	Jumaya
Caspe	Caspe	Los Rosales
Cuarte	Cuarte de Huerva	Nuevo Municipal
Ebro	Zaragoza	El Carmen
Épila	Épila	La Huerta
Fraga	Fraga	La Estacada
Fuentes	Fuentes de Ebro	San Miguel
Huesca B	Huesca	San Jorge
La Almunia	La Almunia de Doña Godina	Tenerías
Tamarite	Tamarite de Litera	La Colomina
Utrillas	Utrillas	La Vega
Zuera	Zuera	José Guzmán

==== League table ====
Pos	Team	Pld	W	D	L	GF	GA	GD	Pts	Qualification
1	Ebro (C, P)	34	19	8	7	49	20	+29	65	Promotion to Segunda Federación and qualification for Copa del Rey
2	Huesca B	34	17	7	10	49	36	+13	58	Qualification for the promotion play-offs
3	Cuarte	34	15	12	7	38	25	+13	57 (Note: Cuarte finished ahead of Atlético Monzón on head-to-head points: Atlético Monzón 0–1 Cuarte, Cuarte 3–2 Atlético Monzón)	Qualification for the promotion play-offs
4	Atlético Monzón	34	16	9	9	52	35	+17	57	Qualification for the promotion play-offs
5	Binéfar	34	14	14	6	44	27	+17	56	Qualification for the promotion play-offs
6	Zuera	34	13	10	11	38	29	+9	49	
7	Calamocha	34	11	14	9	41	37	+4	47 (Note: Calamocha finished ahead of Épila on head-to-head points: Épila 0–2 Calamocha, Calamocha 1–0 Épila)	
8	Épila	34	12	11	11	31	30	+1	47	
9	Tamarite	34	12	10	12	40	42	−2	46	
10	Utrillas	34	10	11	13	29	39	−10	41 (Note: Utrillas finished ahead of Caspe on head-to-head goal difference: Utrillas 0–1 Caspe, Caspe 0–2 Utrillas)	
11	Caspe	34	10	11	13	27	31	−4	41	
12	Andorra	34	8	16	10	34	38	−4	40	
13	Almudévar	34	9	12	13	30	36	−6	39 (Note: Head-to-head points: Almudévar 8 pts, Belchite 97 6 pts, La Almunia 1 pt)	
14	Belchite 97	34	9	12	13	35	34	+1	39	
15	La Almunia	34	11	6	17	33	45	−12	39	
16	Fraga (R)	34	9	10	15	38	53	−15	37	Relegation to Regional Preferente
17	Brea (R)	34	9	8	17	26	43	−17	35	Relegation to Regional Preferente
18	Fuentes (R)	34	9	5	20	20	54	−34	32	Relegation to Regional Preferente

Rules for classification: 1) points; 2) head-to-head points; 3) head-to-head goal difference; 4) goal difference; 5) number of goals scored
(C) Champions; (P) Promoted; (R) Relegated

=== Group 18 – Castilla–La Mancha ===
Teams retained from 2023–24 Tercera Federación

- Atlético Albacete
- Azuqueca
- Calvo Sotelo
- Cazalegas
- Huracán Balazote
- Marchamalo
- Quintanar del Rey
- Socuéllamos
- Tarancón
- Toledo
- Villacañas
- Villarrobledo
- Villarrubia

Teams relegated from 2023–24 Segunda Federación

- Manchego

Teams promoted from 2023–24 Primera Autonómica Preferente

- Manzanares
- Noblejas
- Pedroñeras
- Valdepeñas

==== Teams and locations ====
Location of teams of the 2024–25 Tercera Federación Group 18

Team	City	Home ground
Atlético Albacete	Albacete	Andrés Iniesta
Azuqueca	Azuqueca de Henares	San Miguel
Calvo Sotelo	Puertollano	Ciudad de Puertollano
Cazalegas	Cazalegas	Ciudad Deportiva Ébora Formación
Huracán Balazote	Balazote	Municipal de Barrax
Manchego	Ciudad Real	Juan Carlos I
Manzanares	Manzanares	José Camacho
Marchamalo	Marchamalo	La Solana
Noblejas	Noblejas	Municipal Ángel Luengo
Pedroñeras	Las Pedroñeras	Municipal
Quintanar del Rey	Quintanar del Rey	San Marcos
Socuéllamos	Socuéllamos	Paquito Jiménez
Tarancón	Tarancón	Municipal
Toledo	Toledo	Salto del Caballo
Valdepeñas	Valdepeñas	La Molineta
Villacañas	Villacañas	Las Pirámides
Villarrobledo	Villarrobledo	Nuestra Señora de la Caridad
Villarrubia	Villarrubia de los Ojos	Nuevo Municipal

==== League table ====
Pos	Team	Pld	W	D	L	GF	GA	GD	Pts	Qualification
1	Quintanar del Rey (C, P)	34	17	13	4	31	15	+16	64	Promotion to Segunda Federación and qualification for Copa del Rey
2	Atlético Albacete	34	17	12	5	61	31	+30	63	Qualification for the promotion play-offs
3	Toledo	34	18	8	8	47	17	+30	62 (Note: Toledo finished ahead of Villacañas on head-to-head points: Villacañas 1–4 Toledo, Toledo 3–0 Villacañas)	Qualification for the promotion play-offs
4	Villacañas (Note: Villacañas awarded a 3–0 win in Round 19 against Villarrobledo after the latter did not travel for the match. Villarrobledo was also deducted 3 points.)	34	18	8	8	39	29	+10	62	Qualification for the promotion play-offs
5	Socuéllamos (P)	34	16	9	9	47	24	+23	57	Qualification for the promotion play-offs
6	Huracán Balazote	34	14	14	6	41	28	+13	56	
7	Tarancón	34	15	10	9	41	31	+10	55	
8	Cazalegas	34	14	7	13	47	44	+3	49	
9	Calvo Sotelo	34	11	15	8	39	39	0	48	
10	Villarrubia	34	12	11	11	40	38	+2	47	
11	Manchego	34	12	9	13	45	37	+8	45	
12	Pedroñeras	34	11	10	13	37	43	−6	43	
13	Marchamalo	34	12	5	17	50	47	+3	41 (Note: Marchamalo finished ahead of Azuqueca on head-to-head goal difference: Azuqueca 3–2 Marchamalo, Marchamalo 3–1 Azuqueca)	
14	Azuqueca	34	10	11	13	40	49	−9	41	
15	Villarrobledo	34	10	9	15	31	49	−18	36	
16	Valdepeñas (Note: Valdepeñas awarded a 3–0 win in their Round 1 match against Manzanares after the latter fielded an ineligible player. The match originally ended 0–0) (R)	34	3	13	18	21	48	−27	22	Relegation to Primera Autonómica Preferente
17	Noblejas (R)	34	3	9	22	30	69	−39	18	Relegation to Primera Autonómica Preferente
18	Manzanares (R)	34	2	9	23	23	72	−49	15	Relegation to Primera Autonómica Preferente

Rules for classification: 1) points; 2) head-to-head points; 3) head-to-head goal difference; 4) goal difference; 5) number of goals scored
(C) Champions; (P) Promoted; (R) Relegated

== Qualification for Copa del Rey ==
In addition to the 18 best-placed non-reserve teams qualifying for the Copa del Rey, the seven best non-reserve runners-up of the 18 groups that have not already qualified will also participate.

== See also ==
- 2024–25 La Liga
- 2024–25 Segunda División
- 2024–25 Primera Federación
- 2024–25 Segunda Federación
