= Javi Amaya =

Spanish footballer (born 1990)

Personal information
- Full name: Javier Amaya Corredera
- Date of birth: 3 January 1990 (age 36)
- Place of birth: Torremolinos, Spain
- Height: 1.87 m (6 ft 2 in)
- Position: Winger

Team information
- Current team: Marbellí

Youth career
- Fuengirola
- 2008–2009: Almería

Senior career*
Years	Team	Apps	(Gls)
2009	Almería B	1	(0)
2009	→ Juventud Torremolinos (loan)	4	(1)
2009–2010	Raith Rovers	6	(1)
2010	Annan Athletic	3	(0)
2010–2011	Alhaurino	13	(2)
2011–2012	Yverdon-Sport	10	(2)
2012	Juventud Torremolinos	2	(0)
2012–2013	Næstved	9	(0)
2013–2014	Juventud Torremolinos	31	(8)
2014–2015	El Palo	26	(1)
2015–2024	Juventud Torremolinos		
2024–	Marbellí	6	(1)
- * Club domestic league appearances and goals as of 13 October 2024

Javier 'Javi' Amaya Corredera (born 3 January 1990) is a Spanish footballer who plays for Marbellí in Tercera Federación. Mainly a left winger, he can also play as a forward.

== Club career ==
Born in Torremolinos, Málaga, Andalusia, Amaya graduated from local UD Almería's youth system, and made his senior debuts with the reserves in the 2008–09 season, in Tercera División. After a loan spell with Juventud de Torremolinos CF he moved abroad, joining Scottish First Division side Raith Rovers on 24 November 2009.

Amaya made his professional debut on 16 December 2009, starting and scoring his side's only in a 1–1 home draw against Airdrie United. He appeared in six league games for Raith during the campaign, and was released in May 2010.

On 6 October 2010, Amaya moved to Annan Athletic, but was released after only six weeks at the club, making five appearances (three in the league). He subsequently returned to Spain, joining CD Alhaurino in the fourth level.

In 2011, Amaya moved teams and countries again, signing for Yverdon-Sport FC in the Swiss 1. Liga Promotion. He appeared regularly for the side, and in January of the following year returned to former club Torremolinos. In March, he joined Næstved BK, rescinding with the latter in January 2013.

Amaya returned to Torremolinos for a third time in February 2013, and appeared regularly for the side in the regional leagues. On 31 July 2014 he first arrived in Segunda División B, after agreeing to a one-year deal with CD El Palo.
