= CA Artajonés =

Association football club in Spain

Artajonés
- Full name: Club Atlético Artajonés
- Founded: 1951
- Ground: La Alameda, Artajona, Navarre, Spain
- Capacity: 2,500
- President: Ángel Cervantes
- Manager: Diego Fernández Burgui
- League: Primera Autonómica
- 2025–26: Tercera Federación – Group 15, 18th of 18 (relegated)
Home colours	Away colours

Club Atlético Artajonés is a Spanish football club based in Artajona, in the autonomous community of Navarre. Founded in 1951, they play in Primera Autonómica, holding home matches at the Estadio La Alameda, with a capacity of 2,500 people.

== Season to season ==
Season	Tier	Division	Place	Copa del Rey
1964–65	5	2ª Reg.	3rd	
1965–66	5	2ª Reg.	3rd	
1966–67	5	2ª Reg.	2nd	
1967–68	5	2ª Reg.	2nd	
1968–69	5	2ª Reg.	1st	
1969–70	5	2ª Reg.	1st	
1970–71	4	1ª Reg.	6th	
1971–72	4	1ª Reg.	8th	
1972–73	4	1ª Reg.	3rd	
1973–74	4	1ª Reg.	13th	
1974–75	4	Reg. Pref.	18th	
1975–76	5	1ª Reg.	4th	
1976–77	5	1ª Reg.	9th	
1977–78	6	1ª Reg.	8th	
1978–79	6	1ª Reg.	16th	
1979–1984	DNP			
1984–85	7	2ª Reg.	1st	
1985–86	6	1ª Reg.	6th	
1986–87	5	Reg. Pref.	2nd	
1987–88	5	Reg. Pref.	1st	

Season	Tier	Division	Place	Copa del Rey
1988–89	4	3ª	6th	
1989–90	4	3ª	16th	
1990–91	4	3ª	8th	
1991–92	4	3ª	3rd	
1992–93	4	3ª	8th	First round
1993–94	4	3ª	12th	
1994–95	4	3ª	14th	
1995–96	4	3ª	10th	
1996–97	4	3ª	10th	
1997–98	4	3ª	7th	
1998–99	4	3ª	17th	
1999–2000	4	3ª	17th	
2000–01	4	3ª	18th	
2001–02	5	Reg. Pref.	17th	
2002–03	5	Reg. Pref.	8th	
2003–04	5	Reg. Pref.	10th	
2004–05	5	Reg. Pref.	2nd	
2005–06	4	3ª	17th	
2006–07	5	Reg. Pref.	2nd	
2007–08	4	3ª	18th	

Season	Tier	Division	Place	Copa del Rey
2008–09	5	Reg. Pref.	4th	
2009–10	5	Reg. Pref.	3rd	
2010–11	5	Reg. Pref.	10th	
2011–12	5	Reg. Pref.	10th	
2012–13	5	Reg. Pref.	3rd	
2013–14	4	3ª	20th	
2014–15	5	Reg. Pref.	4th	
2015–16	5	1ª Aut.	16th	
2016–17	6	Reg. Pref.	13th	
2017–18	6	Reg. Pref.	5th	
2018–19	6	Reg. Pref.	3rd	
2019–20	5	1ª Aut.	12th	
2020–21	5	1ª Aut.	9th	
2021–22	6	1ª Aut.	7th	
2022–23	6	1ª Aut.	8th	
2023–24	6	1ª Aut.	3rd	
2024–25	5	3ª Fed.	13th	
2025–26	5	3ª Fed.		

- 16 seasons in Tercera División
- 2 seasons in Tercera Federación
