= CD Valladares =

Spanish football club

Valladares
- Full name: Club Deportivo Valladares
- Short name: CDV
- Founded: 1923; 103 years ago
- Stadium: Campo da Gándara
- Capacity: 500
- President: Roberto Guisande
- Head coach: Ita
- League: Preferente Futgal – Group 2
- 2025–26: Preferente Futgal – Group 2, 8th of 18
- Website: cdvalladares.com
Home colours	Away colours

Club Deportivo Valladares is a Spanish football club based in Valladares, a parish in the city of Vigo, in the autonomous community of Galicia. Founded in 1923, they currently play in Preferente Futgal – Group 1, holding home matches at the Campo da Gándara.

== History ==
Valladares were founded in 1923, after a group of men decided to establish a football club in the city. The club entered the Galician Football Federation only in 1950, and played regional football until 1987, whey they achieved their first-ever promotion to Tercera División.

After a short-lived experience in the fourth tier, where they suffered immediate relegation, Valladares returned to the lower leagues until achieving promotion to Tercera Federación in May 2024.

== Season to season ==
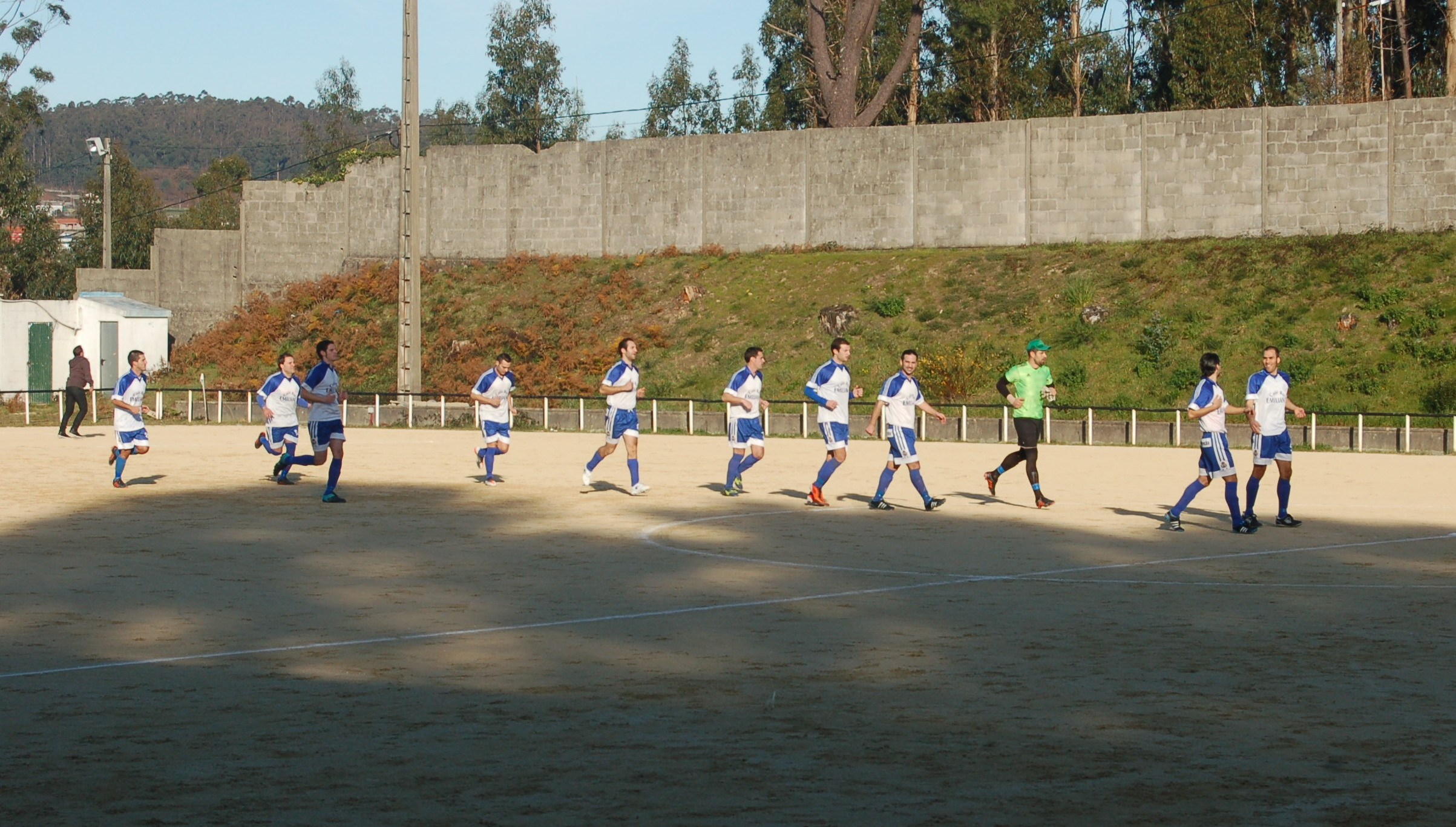
Valladares playing in 2012

Season	Tier	Division	Place	Copa del Rey
1965–66	5	1ª Reg.	7th	
1966–67	5	1ª Reg.	6th	
1967–68	DNP			
1968–69	5	1ª Reg.	6th	
1969–70	5	1ª Reg.	8th	
1970–71	5	1ª Reg.	7th	
1971–72	5	1ª Reg.	1st	
1972–73	5	1ª Reg.	3rd	
1973–74	5	1ª Reg.	1st	
1974–75	5	1ª Reg.	1st	
1975–76	5	1ª Reg.	5th	
1976–77	5	1ª Reg.	6th	
1977–78	6	1ª Reg.	8th	
1978–79	6	1ª Reg.	12th	
1979–80	6	1ª Reg.	14th	
1980–81	6	1ª Reg.	1st	
1981–82	5	Reg. Pref.	13th	
1982–83	5	Reg. Pref.	18th	
1983–84	6	1ª Reg.	2nd	
1984–85	5	Reg. Pref.	4th	

Season	Tier	Division	Place	Copa del Rey
1985–86	5	Reg. Pref.	9th	
1986–87	5	Reg. Pref.	3rd	
1987–88	4	3ª	18th	
1988–89	5	Reg. Pref.	10th	
1989–90	5	Reg. Pref.	11th	
1990–91	5	Reg. Pref.	15th	
1991–92	5	Reg. Pref.	12th	
1992–93	5	Reg. Pref.	12th	
1993–94	5	Reg. Pref.	7th	
1994–95	5	Reg. Pref.	20th	
1995–96	6	1ª Reg.	4th	
1996–97	6	1ª Reg.	1st	
1997–98	5	Reg. Pref.	13th	
1998–99	5	Reg. Pref.	6th	
1999–2000	5	Reg. Pref.	14th	
2000–01	5	Reg. Pref.	7th	
2001–02	5	Reg. Pref.	17th	
2002–03	6	1ª Reg.	5th	
2003–04	6	1ª Reg.	2nd	
2004–05	5	Reg. Pref.	9th	

Season	Tier	Division	Place	Copa del Rey
2005–06	5	Reg. Pref.	20th	
2006–07	6	1ª Aut.	11th	
2007–08	6	1ª Aut.	12th	
2008–09	6	1ª Aut.	9th	
2009–10	6	1ª Aut.	3rd	
2010–11	6	1ª Aut.	6th	
2011–12	6	1ª Aut.	2nd	
2012–13	5	Pref. Aut.	8th	
2013–14	5	Pref. Aut.	4th	
2014–15	5	Pref. Aut.	10th	
2015–16	5	Pref.	9th	
2016–17	5	Pref.	7th	
2017–18	5	Pref.	11th	
2018–19	5	Pref.	13th	
2019–20	5	Pref.	19th	
2020–21	5	Pref.	6th	
2021–22	6	Pref.	7th	
2022–23	6	Pref.	11th	
2023–24	6	Pref.	2nd	
2024–25	5	3ª Fed.	16th	

Season	Tier	Division	Place	Copa del Rey
2025–26	6	Pref. Futgal	8th	
2026–27	6	Pref. Futgal		

- 1 season in Tercera División
- 1 season in Tercera Federación
