= AD San Viator =

Association football club in Spain

San Viator
- Full name: Asociación Deportiva San Viator
- Nickname: Colegiales
- Founded: 1970
- Ground: San Viator, Vitoria-Gasteiz, Basque Country, Spain
- Capacity: 1,000
- Head coach: Imanol Ganuza
- 2025–26: División de Honor, 9th of 18
- Website: https://sanviator.eus/
Home colours	Away colours

Asociación Deportiva San Viator (sometimes referred as Club Deportivo San Viator) is a football team based in Vitoria-Gasteiz in the autonomous community of the Basque Country. The club belongs to Colegio San Viator Ikastetxea, established in 1970, and has football, basketball and chess sections.

Its football section plays in .

== History ==
Known for their basketball section, which had Pablo Laso and Roberto Íñiguez as a member of their youth sides, San Viator first played senior football in 1980, as a member of the Primera Regional de Guipúzcoa. The side ceased activities two years later, returning in 1986 and moving to the Regional Preferente de Álava in the following year.

San Viator played in the regional leagues until 2004, later spending ten years without a senior side before returning in 2014. On 25 May 2024, the club achieved promotion to Tercera Federación for the first time ever.

== Season to season (football) ==
Season	Tier	Division	Place	Copa del Rey
1980–81	6	1ª Reg.	8th	
1981–82	6	1ª Reg.	7th	
1982–1986	DNP			
1986–87	6	1ª Reg.	2nd	
1987–88	5	Reg. Pref.	12th	
1988–89	6	1ª Reg.	5th	
1989–90	5	Reg. Pref.	9th	
1990–91	5	Reg. Pref.	6th	
1991–92	5	Reg. Pref.	5th	
1992–93	5	Reg. Pref.	6th	
1993–94	5	Reg. Pref.	13th	
1994–95	5	Reg. Pref.	10th	
1995–96	5	Reg. Pref.	14th	
1996–97	5	Reg. Pref.	14th	
1997–98	5	Reg. Pref.	13th	
1998–99	5	Reg. Pref.	18th	
1999–2000	6	1ª Reg.	1st	
2000–01	5	Reg. Pref.	11th	
2001–02	5	Reg. Pref.	14th	
2002–03	5	Reg. Pref.	17th	

Season	Tier	Division	Place	Copa del Rey
2003–04	6	1ª Reg.	8th	
2004–2014	DNP			
2014–15	6	1ª Reg.	6th	
2015–16	6	1ª Reg.	6th	
2016–17	6	1ª Reg.	1st	
2017–18	5	Reg. Pref.	6th	
2018–19	5	Reg. Pref.	8th	
2019–20	5	Reg. Pref.	8th	
2020–21	5	Reg. Pref.	3rd	
2021–22	6	Reg. Pref.	5th	
2022–23	6	Reg. Pref.	2nd	
2023–24	6	Reg. Pref.	1st	
2024–25	5	3ª Fed.	18th	
2025–26	6	Reg. Pref.		

- 1 season in Tercera Federación
