= Rotxapea CD =

Association football club in Spain

Rotxapea
- Full name: Rotxapea Club Deportivo
- Nicknames: Rotxa, RTX
- Founded: 2001
- Ground: La Jaula, Pamplona, Navarre, Spain
- Capacity: 1,000
- President: Álex Rodríguez
- Manager: Rodri Fernández de la Barrena
- League: Regional Preferente – Group 1
- 2025–26: Primera Autonómica, 16th of 18 (relegated)
Home colours	Away colours

Rotxapea Club Deportivo is a Spanish football team based in Pamplona in the autonomous community of Navarre. Founded in 2013, it plays in Regional Preferente – Group 1, holding home matches at the Campo de Fútbol Irati, with a capacity of 1,000 people.

== History ==
Founded in 2001, Rotxapea became the third team of the neighborhood after CD Rochapeano and UDC Rochapea. The club only started a senior team in 2013, and achieved a first-ever promotion to Tercera Federación in 2024.

== Season to season ==
Season	Tier	Division	Place	Copa del Rey
2013–14	6	1ª Reg.	5th	
2014–15	6	1ª Reg.	2nd	
2015–16	6	Reg. Pref.	3rd	
2016–17	6	Reg. Pref.	10th	
2017–18	6	Reg. Pref.	2nd	
2018–19	6	Reg. Pref.	5th	
2019–20	6	Reg. Pref.	4th	
2020–21	6	Reg. Pref.	3rd	
2021–22	7	Reg. Pref.	8th	
2022–23	7	Reg. Pref.	2nd	
2023–24	6	1ª Aut.	1st	
2024–25	5	3ª Fed.	16th	
2025–26	6	1ª Aut.		

- 1 season in Tercera Federación
