= Águilas FC B =

Association football club in Spain

Águilas B
- Full name: Águilas Fútbol Club "B"
- Founded: September 2008; 18 years ago
- Ground: El Rubial, Águilas, Murcia, Spain
- Capacity: 4,000
- President: Alfonso García Gabarrón
- Manager: Sergio Yúfera
- League: Tercera Federación – Group 13
- 2025–26: Tercera Federación – Group 13, 7th of 18
- Website: https://www.aguilasfc.es/
Home colours	Away colours

Águilas Fútbol Club "B" is a Spanish football club based in Águilas, in the Region of Murcia. A reserve team of Águilas FC, it plays in Tercera Federación – Group 13, holding home games at Estadio El Rubial, with a capacity of 4,000 spectators.

== History ==
Sporting Club Aguileño was founded in September 2008, and was acquired by Águilas FC in July 2016, to become their reserve team. The club achieved a first-ever promotion to Tercera Federación on 23 June 2024, after Real Murcia Imperial missed out promotion and Mazarrón FC (their farm team) was then unable to promote.

=== Club names ===
- Sporting Club Aguileño (2008–2016)
- Águilas Fútbol Club "B" (2016–)

== Season to season ==
- As SC Aguileño

Season	Tier	Division	Place	Copa del Rey
2008–09	7	1ª Terr.	5th	
2009–10	6	Liga Aut.	7th	
2010–11	6	1ª Aut.	3rd	
2011–12	5	Pref. Aut.	11th	
2012–13	5	Pref. Aut.	7th	
2013–14	5	Pref. Aut.	14th	
2014–15	5	Pref. Aut.	8th	
2015–16	5	Pref. Aut.	17th	

- As a reserve team

Season	Tier	Division	Place
2016–17	6	1ª Aut.	6th
2017–18	6	1ª Aut.	15th
2018–19	6	1ª Aut.	8th
2019–20	6	1ª Aut.	9th
2020–21	5	Pref. Aut.	6th
2021–22	6	Pref. Aut.	2nd
2022–23	6	Pref. Aut.	3rd
2023–24	6	Pref. Aut.	3rd
2024–25	5	3ª Fed.	5th
2025–26	5	3ª Fed.	7th
2026–27	5	3ª Fed.	

- 3 seasons in Tercera Federación
