= FC Marbellí =

Association football club in Spain

Marbellí
- Full name: Fútbol Club Marbellí
- Nickname: Submarino amarillo (Yellow submarine)
- Founded: 23 June 2006; 20 years ago (as CD Atlético Marbellí)
- Ground: Antonio Naranjo, Marbella, Málaga, Andalusia, Spain
- Capacity: 1,500
- President: Salvador Gil Machuca
- Manager: Alejandro Álvarez
- League: Tercera Federación – Group 9
- 2025–26: Tercera Federación – Group 9, 6th of 18
- Website: https://www.futbolclubmarbelli.es/fcm/
Home colours	Away colours

Fútbol Club Marbellí is a Spanish football team based in Marbella, Málaga, in the autonomous community of Andalusia. Founded in 2006, they currently play in Tercera Federación – Group 9, holding home matches at Estadio Municipal Antonio Naranjo, with a capacity of 1,500 spectators.

== History ==
Founded in 2006 as CD Atlético Marbellí, the club was renamed to FC Marbellí in 2022. In July 2024, the club bought Vélez CF's place (administratively relegated) in Tercera Federación, jumping up two categories at once.

== Season to season ==
Season	Tier	Division	Place	Copa del Rey
2014–15	7	3ª And.	9th	
2015–16	7	3ª And.	(R)	
2016–17	8	3ª And.	10th	
2017–18	8	3ª And.	5th	
2018–19	7	2ª And.	8th	
2019–20	7	2ª And.	12th	
2020–21	7	2ª And.	4th	
2021–22	8	2ª And.	7th	
2022–23	8	2ª And.	1st	
2023–24	7	1ª And.	1st	
2024–25	5	3ª Fed.	10th	
2025–26	5	3ª Fed.	6th	
2026–27	5	3ª Fed.		

- 3 seasons in Tercera Federación
