= CF Noia =

Spanish football club

Noia
- Full name: Club de Fútbol Noia
- Nickname: Barbanzanos
- Founded: 1928; 98 years ago
- Stadium: Estadio Municipal de San Lázaro
- Capacity: 1,000
- President: José Luis Botana
- Head coach: Vecho
- League: Preferente Futgal – Group 1
- 2025–26: Tercera Federación – Group 1, 17th of 18 (relegated)
- Website: http://www.cfnoia.es/
Home colours	Away colours

Club de Fútbol Noia is a Spanish football club based in Noia, in the autonomous community of Galicia. Founded in 1928, they currently play in Preferente Futgal – Group 1, holding home matches at the Estadio Municipal de San Lázaro.

== History ==
Noia was originally created in 1926, as a merger of two clubs in the city, Sporting and Unión Sportiva. The club was inscribed in the Galician Football Federation on 28 August 1928 (year of the official foundation), being placed in the Serie B, the second division of regional football.

Noia played in regional leagues until 2015, when the club achieved a first-ever promotion to Tercera División in the play-offs, after a vacant place in the fourth tier was created after the promotion of Pontevedra CF to Segunda División B. Having Yago Iglesias as manager, they were unable to maintain their category and returned to Preferente after obtaining a 19th place during the season.

Noia returned to Tercera after a one-year absence in May 2017, but again suffered immediate relegation. In 2021, the club reached another promotion, now to the newly-created Tercera División RFEF, the new fifth tier.

Another relegation campaign followed, and the club remained two seasons in the Preferente until achieving promotion on 5 May 2024.

== Season to season ==
Season	Tier	Division	Place	Copa del Rey
1988–89	6	1ª Reg.	1st	
1989–90	5	Reg. Pref.	6th	
1990–91	5	Reg. Pref.	17th	
1991–92	6	1ª Reg.	9th	
1992–93	6	1ª Reg.	3rd	
1993–94	5	Reg. Pref.	13th	
1994–95	5	Reg. Pref.	4th	
1995–96	5	Reg. Pref.	8th	
1996–97	5	Reg. Pref.	10th	
1997–98	5	Reg. Pref.	15th	
1998–99	5	Reg. Pref.	13th	
1999–2000	5	Reg. Pref.	13th	
2000–01	5	Reg. Pref.	13th	
2001–02	5	Reg. Pref.	4th	
2002–03	5	Reg. Pref.	18th	
2003–04	6	1ª Reg.	6th	
2004–05	6	1ª Reg.	8th	
2005–06	6	1ª Reg.	2nd	
2006–07	5	Pref. Aut.	16th	
2007–08	5	Pref. Aut.	11th	

Season	Tier	Division	Place	Copa del Rey
2008–09	5	Pref. Aut.	14th	
2009–10	5	Pref. Aut.	17th	
2010–11	5	Pref. Aut.	20th	
2011–12	6	1ª Aut.	4th	
2012–13	6	1ª Aut.	3rd	
2013–14	6	1ª Aut.	1st	
2014–15	5	Pref. Aut.	3rd	
2015–16	4	3ª	19th	
2016–17	5	Pref.	1st	
2017–18	4	3ª	17th	
2018–19	5	Pref.	4th	
2019–20	5	Pref.	4th	
2020–21	5	Pref.	1st	
2021–22	5	3ª RFEF	14th	
2022–23	6	Pref.	4th	
2023–24	6	Pref.	1st	
2024–25	5	3ª Fed.	5th	
2025–26	5	3ª Fed.		

- 2 seasons in Tercera División
- 3 seasons in Tercera Federación/Tercera División RFEF
