= Santomera CF =

Santomera
- Full name: Santomera Club de Fútbol
- Founded: 1948
- Ground: El Limonar, Santomera, Region of Murcia, Spain
- Capacity: 2,000
- Chairman: (Spain) Juan Prior
- Manager: (Spain) Santi Verdú
- League: Tercera Federación – Group 13
- 2025–26: Tercera Federación – Group 13, 15th of 18
Home colours	Away colours

Santomera Club de Fútbol is a football team based in Santomera, Murcia. Founded in 1948, the team plays in Tercera Federación – Group 13. The club's home ground is Estadio El Limonar.

== Season to season ==
Season	Tier	Division	Place	Copa del Rey
1952–53	5	2ª Reg.	7th	
1953–54	5	2ª Reg.	4th	
1954–55	5	2ª Reg.	6th	
1955–56	5	2ª Reg.	4th	
1956–57	DNP			
1957–58	DNP			
1958–59	DNP			
1959–60	5	2ª Reg.	8th	
1960–1969	DNP			
1969–70	5	2ª Reg.	8th	
1970–71	5	2ª Reg.	11th	
1971–72	6	2ª Reg.	13th	
1972–73	6	2ª Reg.	4th	
1973–74	6	2ª Reg.	4th	
1974–75	5	1ª Reg.	16th	
1975–76	5	1ª Reg.	15th	
1976–77	5	1ª Reg.	5th	
1977–78	5	Reg. Pref.	11th	
1978–79	5	Reg. Pref.	17th	
1979–80	5	Reg. Pref.	10th	

Season	Tier	Division	Place	Copa del Rey
1980–81	4	3ª	19th	
1981–82	5	Reg. Pref.	8th	
1982–83	5	Reg. Pref.	7th	
1983–84	5	Reg. Pref.	8th	
1984–85	5	Reg. Pref.	8th	
1985–86	5	Reg. Pref.	3rd	
1986–87	4	3ª	10th	
1987–88	4	3ª	14th	
1988–89	4	3ª	6th	
1989–90	4	3ª	10th	
1990–91	4	3ª	6th	
1991–92	4	3ª	4th	First round
1992–93	4	3ª	16th	First round
1993–94	4	3ª	12th	
1994–95	4	3ª	16th	
1995–96	4	3ª	10th	
1996–97	4	3ª	14th	
1997–98	4	3ª	17th	
1998–99	4	3ª	18th	
1999–2000	5	Terr. Pref.	2nd	

Season	Tier	Division	Place	Copa del Rey
2000–01	5	Terr. Pref.	6th	
2001–02	5	Terr. Pref.	15th	
2002–03	5	Terr. Pref.	9th	
2003–04	5	Terr. Pref.	2nd	
2004–05	4	3ª	17th	
2005–06	4	3ª	20th	
2006–07	5	Terr. Pref.	4th	
2007–08	4	3ª	11th	
2008–09	4	3ª	10th	
2009–10	4	3ª	10th	
2010–11	4	3ª	13th	
2011–12	4	3ª	17th	
2012–13	5	Pref. Aut.	4th	
2013–14	5	Pref. Aut.	9th	
2014–15	DNP			
2015–16	DNP			
2016–17	DNP			
2017–18	7	2ª Aut.	14th	
2018–19	7	2ª Aut.	1st	
2019–20	6	1ª Aut.	5th	

Season	Tier	Division	Place	Copa del Rey
2020–21	5	Pref. Aut.	4th	
2021–22	6	Pref. Aut.	12th	
2022–23	7	1ª Aut.	2nd	
2023–24	7	1ª Aut.	1st	
2024–25	5	3ª Fed.	4th	
2025–26	5	3ª Fed.	15th	
2026–27	5	3ª Fed.		

- 21 seasons in Tercera División
- 3 seasons in Tercera Federación
