= UD Tomares =

Association football club in Spain

Tomares
- Full name: Unión Deportiva Tomares
- Founded: 1976
- Ground: Municipal San Sebastián, Tomares, Seville, Andalusia, Spain
- Capacity: 1,000
- Chairman: Javi Falcón
- Manager: Rafa Tubio
- League: Tercera Federación – Group 10
- 2025–26: Tercera Federación – Group 10, 15th of 18
Home colours	Away colours

Unión Deportiva Tomares is a Spanish football team based in Tomares, Seville, in the autonomous community of Andalusia. Founded in 1976, it currently plays in Tercera Federación – Group 10, holding home matches at Estadio Municipal San Sebastián, with a capacity of 1,000 spectators.

== Season to season ==
Season	Tier	Division	Place	Copa del Rey
1976–77	6	2ª Reg.		
1977–78	7	2ª Reg.		
1978–79	7	2ª Reg.	5th	
1979–80	7	2ª Reg.	1st	
1980–81	6	1ª Reg.	17th	
1981–82	6	1ª Reg.	21st	
1982–83	7	2ª Reg.	16th	
1983–84	7	2ª Reg.	14th	
1984–85	7	2ª Reg.	10th	
1985–86	7	2ª Reg.	13th	
1986–87	7	2ª Reg.	18th	
1987–88	7	2ª Reg.		
1988–89	7	2ª Reg.		
1989–90	7	2ª Reg.	1st	
1990–91	6	1ª Reg.	10th	
1991–92	6	1ª Reg.	14th	
1992–93	6	1ª Reg.	9th	
1993–94	6	1ª Reg.	9th	
1994–95	6	1ª Reg.	5th	
1995–96	6	1ª Reg.	1st	

Season	Tier	Division	Place	Copa del Rey
1996–97	5	Reg. Pref.	2nd	
1997–98	5	Reg. Pref.	2nd	
1998–99	4	3ª	10th	
1999–2000	4	3ª	10th	
2000–01	4	3ª	17th	
2001–02	4	3ª	18th	
2002–03	5	Reg. Pref.	18th	
2003–04	6	1ª Reg.	2nd	
2004–05	6	Reg. Pref.	10th	
2005–06	6	Reg. Pref.	6th	
2006–07	6	Reg. Pref.	1st	
2007–08	5	1ª And.	10th	
2008–09	5	1ª And.	15th	
2009–10	6	Reg. Pref.	7th	
2010–11	6	Reg. Pref.	16th	
2011–12	7	1ª Reg.	2nd	
2012–13	6	Reg. Pref.	7th	
2013–14	6	Reg. Pref.	13th	
2014–15	6	2ª And.	8th	
2015–16	6	2ª And.	3rd	

Season	Tier	Division	Place	Copa del Rey
2016–17	6	1ª And.	6th	
2017–18	6	1ª And.	6th	
2018–19	6	1ª And.	1st	
2019–20	5	Div. Hon.	7th	
2020–21	5	Div. Hon.	1st	First round
2021–22	5	3ª RFEF	15th	
2022–23	6	Div. Hon.	3rd	
2023–24	6	Div. Hon.	2nd	
2024–25	5	3ª Fed.	5th	
2025–26	5	3ª Fed.	15th	
2026–27	5	3ª Fed.		

- 4 seasons in Tercera División
- 4 seasons in Tercera Federación/Tercera División RFEF
