= SD Sarriana =

Sarriana
- Full name: Sociedad Deportiva Sarriana
- Founded: 1968; 58 years ago
- Stadium: Ribela
- Capacity: 5,000
- President: Manuel Sangil
- Head coach: Dani Giménez
- League: Tercera Federación – Group 1
- 2025–26: Segunda Federación – Group 1, 15th of 18 (relegated)
Home colours	Away colours

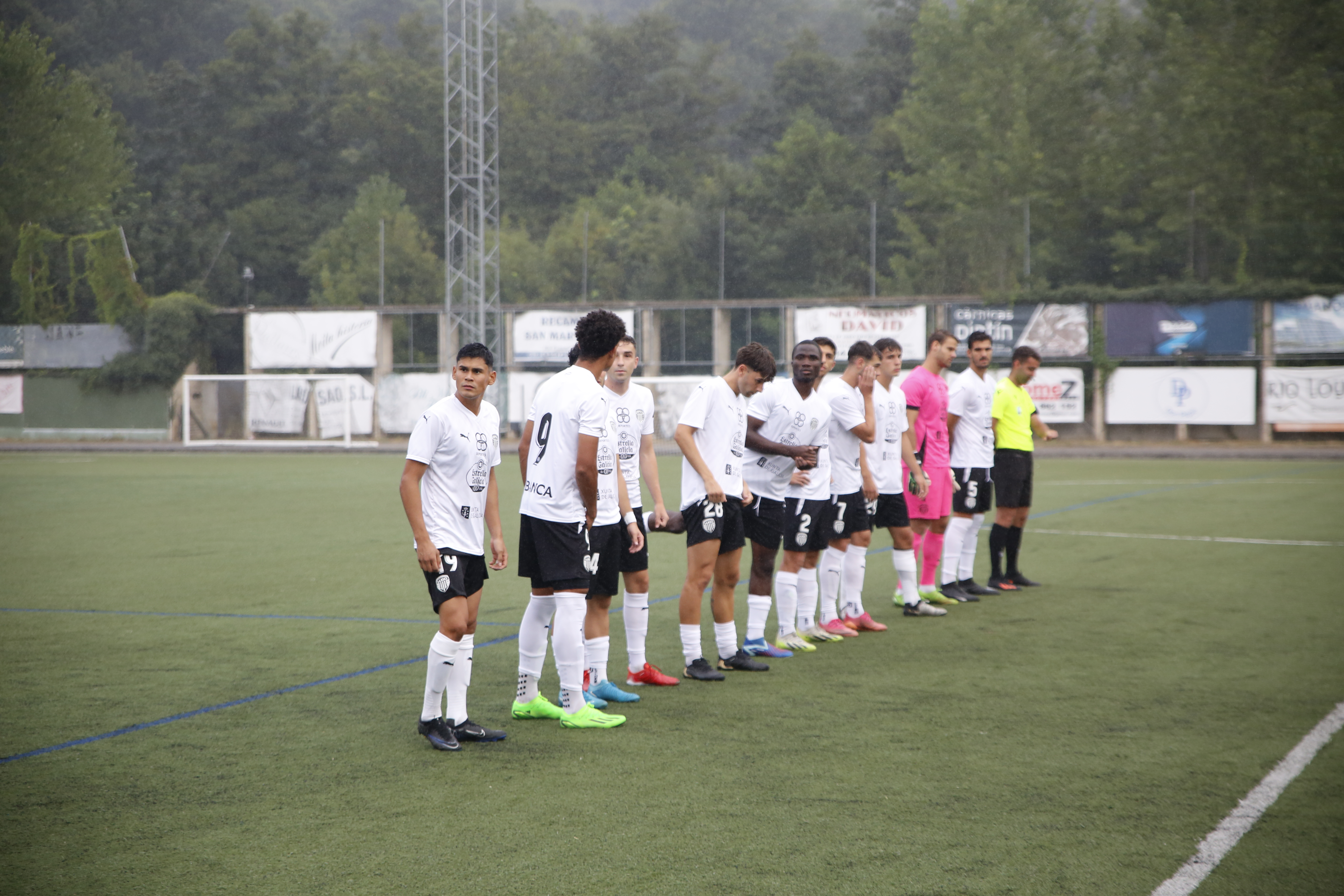
Players of SD Sarriana in 2024.

Sociedad Deportiva Sarriana is a Spanish football club based in Sarria, in the autonomous community of Galicia. Founded in 1968, they currently play in Tercera Federación – Group 1, holding home matches at the Estadio Municipal de Ribela.

== History ==
Founded in 1968, Sarriana only played regional football until 2008, when the club ceased activities for a year. They returned to an active status in the following year, now named Sarria Sociedad Deportiva.

Back to their previous name in 2013, Sarriana achieved a first-ever promotion to Tercera Federación in May 2023. In July 2026, after a one-year spell in Segunda Federación, the club reached a collaboration agreement with CD Lugo to "establish a competitive pathway for young footballers" from the latter club.

== Season to season ==
Season	Tier	Division	Place	Copa del Rey
1970–71	5	1ª Reg.	2nd	
1971–72	5	1ª Reg.	6th	
1972–73	5	1ª Reg.	6th	
1973–74	5	1ª Reg.	1st	
1974–75	4	Serie A	12th	
1975–76	4	Serie A	9th	
1976–77	4	Serie A	14th	
1977–78	5	Serie A	19th	
1978–79	6	1ª Reg.	13th	
1979–80	7	2ª Reg.	1st	
1980–81	6	1ª Reg.	9th	
1981–82	5	Reg. Pref.	13th	
1982–83	5	Reg. Pref.	17th	
1983–84	5	Reg. Pref.	16th	
1984–85	5	Reg. Pref.	19th	
1985–86	6	1ª Reg.	1st	
1986–87	5	Reg. Pref.	7th	
1987–88	5	Reg. Pref.	9th	
1988–89	5	Reg. Pref.	8th	
1989–90	5	Reg. Pref.	17th	

Season	Tier	Division	Place	Copa del Rey
1990–91	6	1ª Reg.	2nd	
1991–92	5	Reg. Pref.	4th	
1992–93	5	Reg. Pref.	4th	
1993–94	5	Reg. Pref.	6th	
1994–95	5	Reg. Pref.	10th	
1995–96	5	Reg. Pref.	13th	
1996–97	5	Reg. Pref.	14th	
1997–98	5	Reg. Pref.	17th	
1998–99	6	1ª Reg.	2nd	
1999–2000	5	Reg. Pref.	14th	
2000–01	5	Reg. Pref.	19th	
2001–02	6	1ª Reg.	9th	
2002–03	6	1ª Reg.	1st	
2003–04	5	Reg. Pref.	12th	
2004–05	5	Reg. Pref.	7th	
2005–06	5	Reg. Pref.	20th	
2006–07	6	1ª Aut.	1st	
2007–08	5	Pref. Aut.	19th	
2008–09	DNP			
2009–10	8	3ª Aut.	15th	

Season	Tier	Division	Place	Copa del Rey
2010–11	8	3ª Aut.	9th	
2011–12	8	3ª Aut.	3rd	
2012–13	7	2ª Aut.	1st	
2013–14	6	1ª Aut.	1st	
2014–15	5	Pref. Aut.	16th	
2015–16	5	Pref.	12th	
2016–17	5	Pref.	19th	
2017–18	6	1ª Gal.	1st	
2018–19	5	Pref.	5th	
2019–20	5	Pref.	9th	
2020–21	5	Pref.	1st	
2021–22	6	Pref.	1st	
2022–23	6	Pref.	1st	
2023–24	5	3ª Fed.	5th	
2024–25	5	3ª Fed.	3rd	
2025–26	4	2ª Fed.	15th	
2026–27	5	3ª Fed.		

- 1 season in Segunda Federación
- 3 seasons in Tercera Federación

== Current squad ==
As of 1 March 2026

Note: Flags indicate national team as defined under FIFA eligibility rules; some limited exceptions apply. Players may hold more than one non-FIFA nationality.

No.	Pos.	Nation	Player
1	GK	GBS	Fernando Embadje (on loan from Lugo)
2	DF	ESP	Alberto Freire (on loan from Lugo)
3	DF	ARG	Tomás Berardozzi (on loan from Arenteiro)
4	DF	ARG	Máximo Levrand
5	DF	ESP	Iago Parga
6	MF	GBS	Ju
7	FW	ESP	Iago Díaz
8	MF	ESP	Jacobo Vilariño
9	FW	ESP	Edu González
10	FW	ESP	Álex Boedo
11	FW	ESP	Hugo Villaverde (on loan from Deportivo La Coruña)
12	MF	ESP	Iker Méndez
13	GK	ESP	César Pirot

No.	Pos.	Nation	Player
14	FW	ESP	Santi Gegunde
15	DF	ESP	Javi Piay
16	DF	BRA	Maycon (on loan from Lugo)
17	DF	ESP	Juanan Toro
18	DF	ESP	Pablo Parada (on loan from Deportivo La Coruña)
19	FW	SEN	Arona Sané
20	FW	ESP	Álex Millán
21	MF	ESP	Keko Vilariño
22	FW	ESP	David Vilán
23	MF	ESP	Fer Redondo
24	FW	ESP	Miguel Clavería (on loan from Juventud Torremolinos)
25	GK	ESP	Victor Arosa
28	DF	ESP	Carlos Dono
