= CD Galapagar =

Spanish football club

Galapagar
- Full name: Club Deportivo Galapagar
- Founded: 1969
- Ground: El Chopo
- Capacity: 300
- President: Jorge Greciano Fernández
- Manager: Javier Zamorano
- League: Tercera Federación – Group 7
- 2025–26: Tercera Federación – Group 7, 10th of 18
- Website: cdgalapagar.com
Home colours	Away colours

Club Deportivo Galapagar is a Spanish football club based in Galapagar, in the Community of Madrid. Founded in 1969, the club play in the Tercera Federación – Group 7.

== History ==
Founded in 1969, the club began playing in 1972, achieving an immediate promotion to the Segunda Regional Ordinaria Castellana. The club played in the regional leagues until June 2021, when they achieved a first-ever promotion to Tercera División RFEF.

== Season-to-season ==
Season	Tier	Division	Place	Copa del Rey
1972–73	7	3ª Reg.	1st	
1973–74	6	2ª Reg.	18th	
1974–75	7	3ª Reg. P.	7th	
1975–76	6	2ª Reg.	2nd	
1976–77	5	1ª Reg.	19th	
1977–78	6	1ª Reg.	16th	
1978–79	7	2ª Reg.	5th	
1979–80	7	2ª Reg.	8th	
1980–81	7	2ª Reg.	14th	
1981–82	7	2ª Reg.	15th	
1982–83	7	2ª Reg.	10th	
1983–84	7	2ª Reg.	13th	
1984–85	7	2ª Reg.	9th	
1985–86	7	2ª Reg.	13th	
1986–87	7	2ª Reg.	14th	
1987–88	7	2ª Reg.	7th	
1988–89	7	2ª Reg.	2nd	
1989–90	6	1ª Reg.	3rd	
1990–91	6	1ª Reg.	4th	
1991–92	6	1ª Reg.	5th	

Season	Tier	Division	Place	Copa del Rey
1992–93	6	1ª Reg.	14th	
1993–94	6	1ª Reg.	6th	
1994–95	6	1ª Reg.	1st	
1995–96	5	Reg. Pref.	18th	
1996–97	6	1ª Reg.	1st	
1997–98	5	Reg. Pref.	14th	
1998–99	5	Reg. Pref.	15th	
1999–2000	6	1ª Reg.	8th	
2000–01	6	1ª Reg.	5th	
2001–02	6	1ª Reg.	9th	
2002–03	6	1ª Reg.	9th	
2003–04	6	1ª Reg.	6th	
2004–05	6	1ª Reg.	1st	
2005–06	5	Reg. Pref.	10th	
2006–07	5	Reg. Pref.	8th	
2007–08	5	Reg. Pref.	18th	
2008–09	6	1ª Reg.	11th	
2009–10	6	1ª Afic.	12th	
2010–11	6	1ª Afic.	8th	
2011–12	6	1ª Afic.	5th	

Season	Tier	Division	Place	Copa del Rey
2012–13	6	1ª Afic.	4th	
2013–14	6	1ª Afic.	1st	
2014–15	5	Pref.	9th	
2015–16	5	Pref.	15th	
2016–17	6	1ª Afic.	1st	
2017–18	5	Pref.	6th	
2018–19	5	Pref.	3rd	
2019–20	5	Pref.	9th	
2020–21	5	Pref.	1st	
2021–22	5	3ª RFEF	12th	
2022–23	5	3ª Fed.	11th	
2023–24	5	3ª Fed.	10th	
2024–25	5	3ª Fed.	5th	
2025–26	5	3ª Fed.	10th	
2026–27	5	3ª Fed.		

- 6 seasons in Tercera Federación/Tercera División RFEF

== Official website ==
- Official website (in Spanish)
- "Spain - CD Galapagar". Soccerway.
