= Estadio El Rubial =

Football stadium in Spain

Coordinates: 37°24′15″N 01°35′24″W

El Rubial
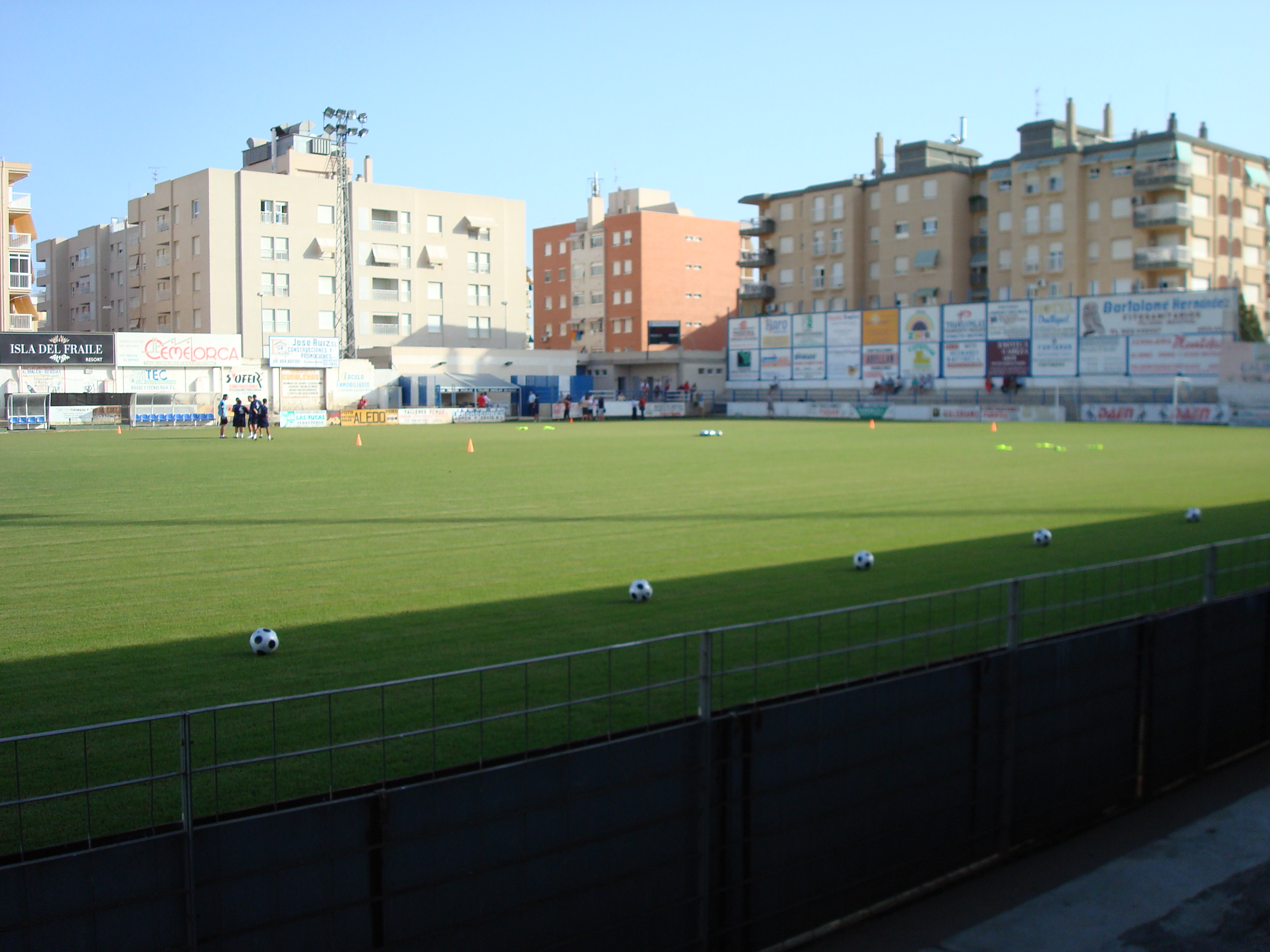
- View of the stadium from the grandstand.
- Interactive map of El Rubial
- Full name: Estadio El Rubial
- Location: Aguilas, Spain
- Owner: Águilas City Council
- Capacity: 4000
- Surface: Grass
- Field size: 98 x 69 m

Construction
- Opened: January 19, 1913

Tenants
- CD Aguileño (1913-1921); Águilas CF (1925-2010); Águilas FC (2010-)

El Rubial football stadium (Spanish: Estadio El Rubial) is located in the municipality of Águilas in the Region of Murcia, Spain. El Rubial, which opened in 1913, is Spain's second-oldest football stadium, after Sporting Gijon's El Molinón.

With a seating capacity of 4000, it is currently the home stadium of Aguilas FC.

== History ==
On February 1, 1913, the magazine "Vida Aguilea" published number 5 with information signed by Pedro Fernández Luna, in which the following is cited:

"On Sunday 19 (January 19, 1913) a football match was held between the first teams of the Sociedad Levantina and the Sporting Club, in the new field that the Club Deportivo Aguileño has behind the electricity factory."

According to this analysis, the "El Rubial" field was first used in 1913, though the deed of purchase for these lands was not signed until June 23, 1915, when Mr. Juan Gray signed the purchase agreement with Mr. José Mara Rubio Muoz before the notary Mr. Luis Gómez Acebo.

The "El Rubial" field was first used in 1913, according to this analysis, but the deed of purchase for these lands was not signed until June 23, 1915, when Mr. Juan Gray signed the purchase agreement with Mr. José Mara Rubio Muoz in front of notary Mr. Luis Gómez Acebo.

It has a main stand and changing block on its north side that dates from 1954 and was formally opened with a friendly against Real Madrid. The ground had to be extended in order to build the stand, and this land was donated to the club by the owner of a farm from which El Rubial got its name.

The stadium was taken over by the City of Águilas in 1987, and its management was given to the now-defunct Águilas C.F. From that point forward, the stadium was known as Municipal Stadium "El Rubial.

In the 2005–06 season, the president of the now-defunct Águilas, C.F. Trinitario Casanova, ordered a major renovation of the stadium, which included the modernization of the presidential box, the construction of a new stand in the background, as well as new booths for changing rooms, offices, and toilets, and the installation of an electronic scoreboard. As a result, the historic manual marker that has presided over changing room exits for decades was replaced.

With the election of Alfonso Garca to the presidency in 2020, the stadium will undergo its second major renovation. One of the bottoms' walls is removed and replaced with a uniform wall, the pitch's dimensions are increased to 98 x 69 metres, and significant improvements are made, including a new perimeter fence around the playing field and the installation of 300 new seats in the bottom stand. The pitch has been completely replaced, and cutting-edge turf tepes have been installed.

Following the promotion of category, new extra stands with approximately 1500 seats are installed to ensure that the Rubial's capacity is fully seated in the inaugural season of the newly formed Second B-Second RFEF

== Events ==
El Rubial occasionally holds the annual Playa y Sol Trophy, the oldest trophy in Spanish football, between teams from the neighboring municipalities of Lorca and Águilas .
