= Artajona =

Town in Navarre, Spain

Coordinates: 42°35′N 1°46′W

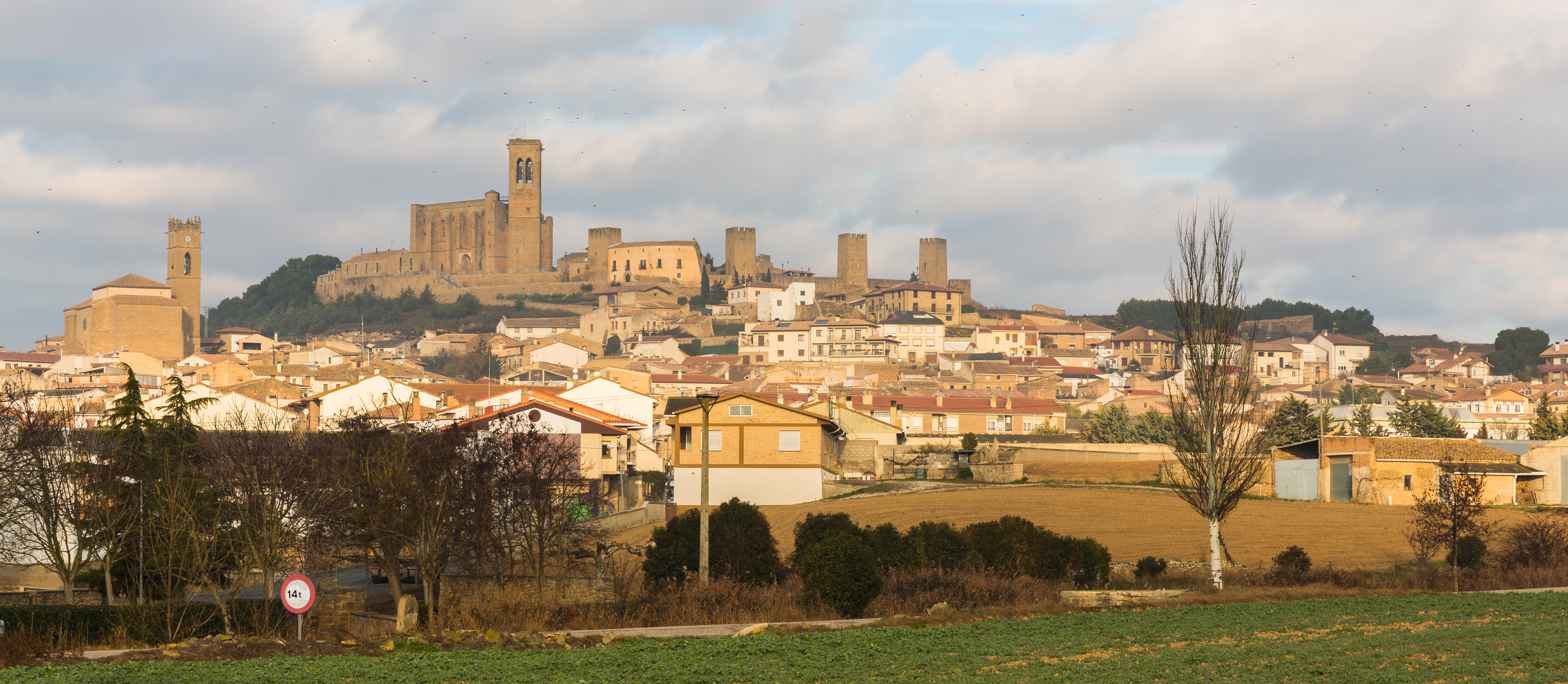
General view of Artajona.

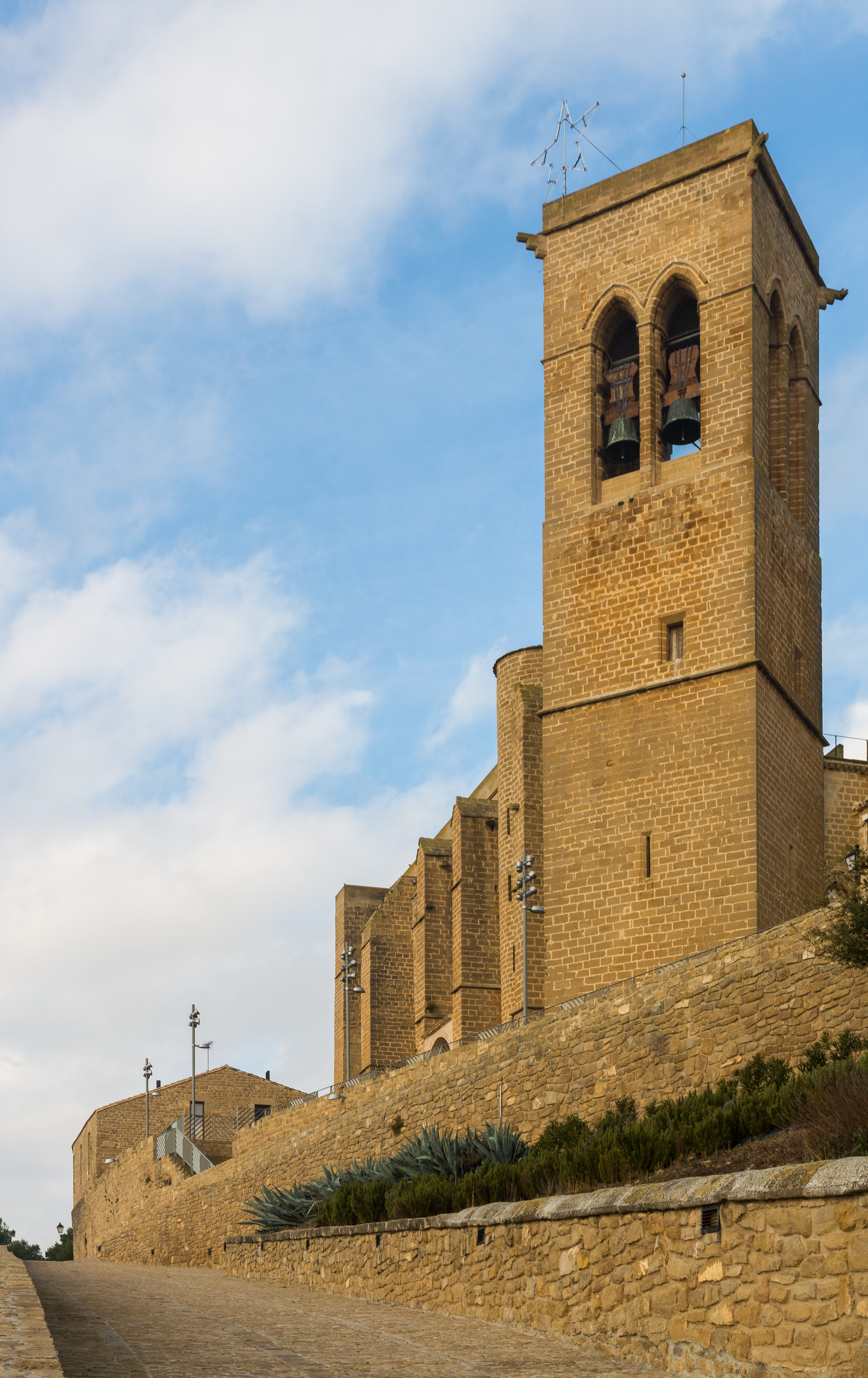
Fortified church of St Saturnino.

Artajona's flag

Artajona's coat of arms

Artajona is a town and municipality located in the province and autonomous community of Navarre, northern Spain.

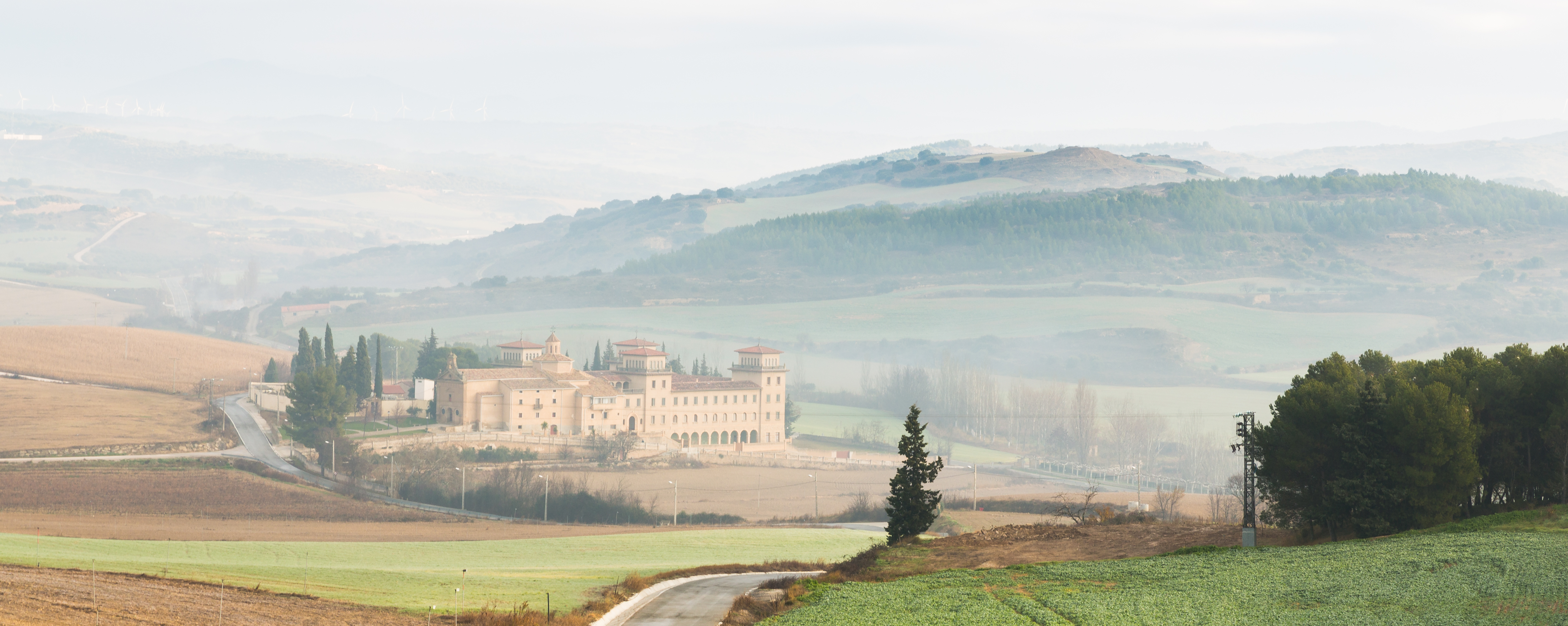
Foggy morning view of the Basilica of Our Lady of Jerusalem, Artajona, Navarre, Spain. The basilica was built between 1709 and 1714 in honor of Our Lady of Jerusalem, patron saint of Artajona.

== Demography ==
The population as of 2025 was 1,783. The age distribution as of 2022 was 264 persons under 16, 1,088 persons aged 16–64, and 410 persons aged 65 or over (total 1,762 persons).

Population of Artajona 1842–2021 (Source:INE)
