= Liu Zhou Linchao =

Chinese football player (born 2003)

Personal information
- Date of birth: 20 March 2003 (age 23)
- Place of birth: Ocaña, Spain
- Position: Forward

Team information
- Current team: Santa Cruz UJAF

Youth career
- 2019–2021: Toledo

Senior career*
Years	Team	Apps	(Gls)
2021–2022	Toledo B	8	(0)
2022–2023	Gimnástica Segoviana	0	(0)
2022–2023	→ Villacañas (loan)	15	(0)
2023	Quintanar	1	(0)
2025–2026	Noblejas	23	(8)
2026–	Santa Cruz UJAF	7	(2)
- * Club domestic league appearances and goals as of 14:01, 29 October 2026 (UTC)

Liu Zhou Linchao (Chinese: 留周琳潮; born 20 March 2003) is a Spanish professional footballer who plays as a forward for Santa Cruz UJAF.

== Club career ==
Liu Zhou was born in Ocaña in the Province of Toledo, Spain, and began his career playing locally in both Ocaña and Aranjuez. In 2019 he joined the academy of professional side Toledo, and in the 2021–22 season he scored twenty-six goals in thirty-four games, winning that season's Liga Nacional Juvenil de Fútbol golden boot.

Having played for Toledo's B team in the Primera Autonómica, he left the club in August 2022, joining Segunda Federación side Gimnástica Segoviana and being loaned immediately to Tercera Federación side Villacañas. After fifteen league appearances without a goal, he joined Quintanar in mid-2023.

Having only managed one appearance for Quintanar, Liu Zhou left the club in December 2023, and was linked with a move to China to join a Chinese Super League club. However, it was reported that he had instead joined a five-a-side team in Tembleque.

== International career ==
In March 2023 it was reported that Liu Zhou had travelled to Croatia to train with the China Olympic Team.

== Career statistics ==
=== Club ===
As of 24 April 2026.

Appearances and goals by club, season and competition
Club	Season	League			Cup		Other		Total	
Club	Season	Division	Apps	Goals	Apps	Goals	Apps	Goals	Apps	Goals
Toledo B	2020–21	Primera Autonómica	7	0	–		0	0	7	0
Toledo B	2021–22	Primera Autonómica	1	0	–		0	0	1	0
Toledo B	Total		8	0	0	0	0	0	8	0
Gimnástica Segoviana	2022–23	Segunda Federación	0	0	0	0	0	0	0	0
Villacañas (loan)	2022–23	Tercera Federación	15	0	0	0	0	0	15	0
Quintanar	2023–24	Primera Autonómica	1	0	0	0	0	0	1	0
Noblejas	2025–26	Primera Autonómica	23	8	0	0	0	0	23	8
Santa Cruz UJAF	2026–27	Primera Autonómica	7	2	0	0	0	0	7	2
Career total			54	10	0	0	0	0	54	10
