= 2022 Copa Federación de España =

Tournament details
- Country: Spain
- Teams: 32 (in national phase)

Final positions
- Champions: Arenteiro (1st title)
- Runners-up: Alzira

Tournament statistics
- Matches played: 31
- Goals scored: 77 (2.48 per match)

The 2022 Copa Federación de España was the 30th edition of the Copa Federación de España, also known as Copa RFEF, a knockout competition for Spanish football clubs.

The competition began in August with the first games of the Regional stages and ended on 2 November with the final of the National tournament. As part of the new competition format started in 2019, the four semifinalists qualified for the Copa del Rey first round.

== Regional tournaments ==
=== Andalusia tournament ===
The Royal Andalusian Football Federation (RFAF) decided to create the 'Copa RFAF' in 2020. The finalists of this competition were selected as the Andalusian representatives in the national phase of Copa RFEF.

Quarter-finals
21 and 28 August
Conil (5) | 1 | 1 | 2
Ciudad de Lucena (5) (15–14 p) | 0 | 2 | 2
Puente Genil (5) (w.o.)
Gerena (5)
20 and 28 August
Torre del Mar (5) | 1 | 2 | 3
Marbella (5) (3–1 p) | 2 | 1 | 3
21 and 28 August
Torredonjimeno (5) | 3 | 1 | 4
Motril (5) | 0 | 2 | 2

Semi-finals
2 September – Torrox
Ciudad de Lucena (5) | 1
Puente Genil (5) (a.e.t.) (2–4 p) | 1
2 September – Torrox
Marbella (5) | 1
Torredonjimeno (5) | 0

Final
4 September – Torrox
Puente Genil (5) | 0
Marbella (5) | 4

==== Final ====
| 4 September | Puente Genil (5) | 0–4 | Marbella (5) | Torrox |
| 12:00 | | Report | Iker Muñoz 21'; Agus 26'; Jorge Álvarez 90'; Cedrick 90+3' | Stadium: Municipal San Roque; Referee: Hidalgo Márquez |

=== Aragon tournament ===
Eight teams joined the tournament: Atlético Monzón (5), Barbastro (5), Binéfar (5), Brea (4), Calamocha (5), Caspe (5), Cuarte (5) and Ejea (5). The group phase started on 14 August.

==== Group 1 ====
| Pos | Team | Pld | W | D | L | GF | GA | GD | Pts | Qualification | MON | CAS | BIN | BAR |
|---|---|---|---|---|---|---|---|---|---|---|---|---|---|---|
| 1 | Atlético Monzón | 3 | 2 | 1 | 0 | 4 | 1 | +3 | 7 | Qualification to the final | — | 1–1 | — | 1–0 |
| 2 | Caspe | 3 | 1 | 1 | 1 | 2 | 2 | 0 | 4 | | — | — | 1–0 | – |
| 3 | Binéfar | 3 | 1 | 0 | 2 | 2 | 4 | −2 | 3 | | 0–2 | — | — | 2–1 |
| 4 | Barbastro | 3 | 1 | 0 | 2 | 2 | 3 | −1 | 3 | | — | 1–0 | — | — |

Updated to match(es) played on 21 August 2022. Source: Federación Aragonesa de Fútbol

==== Group 2 ====
| Pos | Team | Pld | W | D | L | GF | GA | GD | Pts | Qualification | BRE | CUA | CAL | EJE |
|---|---|---|---|---|---|---|---|---|---|---|---|---|---|---|
| 1 | Brea | 3 | 3 | 0 | 0 | 4 | 0 | +4 | 9 | Qualification to the final | — | 2–0 | 1–0 | — |
| 2 | Cuarte | 3 | 1 | 1 | 1 | 1 | 2 | −1 | 4 | | — | — | — | 1–0 |
| 3 | Calamocha | 3 | 0 | 2 | 1 | 0 | 1 | −1 | 2 | | – | 0–0 | — | 0–0 |
| 4 | Ejea | 3 | 0 | 1 | 2 | 0 | 2 | −2 | 1 | | 0–1 | – | – | — |

Updated to match(es) played on 21 August 2022. Source: Federación Aragonesa de Fútbol

==== Final ====
| 28 August | Brea (4) | 1–1 (2–3 p) | Atlético Monzón (5) | Brea de Aragón |
| 19:00 | Rodrigo Tapia 5' | Report | Martín Luna 12' | Stadium: Municipal de Piedrabuena; Referee: Hernández Andrés |

=== Asturias tournament ===
12 teams joined the tournament. The draw was made 15 July and the tournament started 7 August.

| Pot 1 | Pot 2 | Pot 3 |
|---|---|---|
| Avilés^{TH} (4); Langreo (4); Marino Luanco (4); Llanera (5) | Ceares (5); Llanes (5); Caudal (5); Colunga (5) | L'Entregu (5); Praviano (5); Tuilla (5); Covadonga (5) |

==== Group stage ====
===== Group A =====
| Pos | Team | Pld | W | D | L | GF | GA | GD | Pts | Qualification | LLA | ENT | CEA |
|---|---|---|---|---|---|---|---|---|---|---|---|---|---|
| 1 | Llanera | 4 | 3 | 1 | 0 | 8 | 3 | +5 | 10 | Qualification to semifinals | — | 1–1 | 3–2 |
| 2 | L'Entregu | 4 | 2 | 1 | 1 | 5 | 2 | +3 | 7 | | 0–1 | — | 3–0 |
| 3 | Ceares | 4 | 0 | 0 | 4 | 2 | 10 | −8 | 0 | | 0–3 | 0–1 | — |

Updated to match(es) played on 24 August 2022. Source: Fútbol Asturiano

===== Group B =====
| Pos | Team | Pld | W | D | L | GF | GA | GD | Pts | Qualification | LAN | LLA | PRA |
|---|---|---|---|---|---|---|---|---|---|---|---|---|---|
| 1 | Langreo | 4 | 3 | 1 | 0 | 8 | 1 | +7 | 10 | Qualification to semifinals | — | 4–1 | 2–0 |
| 2 | Llanes | 4 | 1 | 2 | 1 | 4 | 5 | −1 | 5 | | 0–0 | — | 3–1 |
| 3 | Praviano | 4 | 0 | 1 | 3 | 1 | 7 | −6 | 1 | | 0–2 | 0–0 | — |

Updated to match(es) played on 24 August 2022. Source: Fútbol Asturiano

===== Group C =====
| Pos | Team | Pld | W | D | L | GF | GA | GD | Pts | Qualification | MAR | COL | TUI |
|---|---|---|---|---|---|---|---|---|---|---|---|---|---|
| 1 | Marino Luanco | 4 | 3 | 1 | 0 | 7 | 2 | +5 | 10 | Qualification to semifinals | — | 3–1 | 2–0 |
| 2 | Colunga | 4 | 1 | 1 | 2 | 5 | 5 | 0 | 4 | | 0–1 | — | 3–0 |
| 3 | Tuilla | 4 | 0 | 2 | 2 | 2 | 7 | −5 | 2 | | 1–1 | 1–1 | — |

Updated to match(es) played on 24 August 2022. Source: Fútbol Asturiano

===== Group D =====
| Pos | Team | Pld | W | D | L | GF | GA | GD | Pts | Qualification | AVI | CAU | COV |
|---|---|---|---|---|---|---|---|---|---|---|---|---|---|
| 1 | Avilés | 4 | 3 | 1 | 0 | 7 | 1 | +6 | 10 | Qualification to semifinals | — | 4–1 | 2–0 |
| 2 | Caudal | 4 | 1 | 2 | 1 | 3 | 5 | −2 | 5 | | 0–0 | — | 0–0 |
| 3 | Covadonga | 4 | 0 | 1 | 3 | 1 | 5 | −4 | 1 | | 0–1 | 1–2 | — |

Updated to match(es) played on 25 August 2022. Source: Fútbol Asturiano

==== Knockout stage ====
The knockout stage matches were played at Las Tolvas Stadium, in Laviana.

Semi-finals
27 August – Laviana
Llanera (5) | 1
Langreo (4) | 0
28 August – Laviana
Marino Luanco (4) | 0
Avilés (4) | 2

Final
8 September – Laviana
Llanera (5) | 1 (4)
Avilés (4) (p) | 1 (5)

==== Final ====
| 8 September | Llanera (5) | 1–1 (4–5 p) | Avilés (4) | Laviana |
| 17:00 | Amadou 75' | Report | Pedro Orfila 2' | Stadium: Las Tolvas; Attendance: 550; Referee: Valdés Díaz |

=== Balearic Islands tournament ===
Llosetense (5) and Platges de Calvià (5) joined the tournament.

| 14 September | Llosetense (5) | 0–2 | Platges de Calvià (5) | Lloseta |
| 20:00 | | Report | Daniel Bardolet 19'; Ramón Bigas 35' | Stadium: Municipal; Referee: Balle Reus |

=== Basque Country tournament ===
Leioa (5) and Real Unión (3) joined the tournament.

| 31 August | Leioa (5) | 1–2 | Real Unión (3) | Leioa |
| 19:30 | Sergi 90+1' (pen.) | Report | Nacho 64'; Quique Rivero 90+3' (pen.) | Stadium: Sarriena; Attendance: 150; Referee: Jon Ander Azkuenaga |

| 14 September | Real Unión (3) | 3–2 | Leioa (5) | Irun |
| 19:30 | Oyarzun 63'; Capelete 76'; Bravo 89' | Report | Jaime 6'; Hugo 39' (pen.) | Stadium: Stadium Gal; Attendance: Martín Ramos; Referee: 400 |

=== Canary Islands tournament ===
Gran Tarajal (5), Herbania (6), Mensajero (5), Panadería Pulido (5) and Unión Viera (6) joined the tournament.

First round
2 September
Unión Viera (6) | 0
Panadería Pulido (5) | 1
3 September
Herbania (6) | 0
Gran Tarajal (5) | 2

Semi-finals
8 September
Panadería Pulido (5) | 2
Gran Tarajal (5) | 1

Final
14 September
Mensajero (5) | 2
Panadería Pulido (5) | 3

==== Final ====
| 14 September | Mensajero (5) | 2–3 | Panadería Pulido (5) | Santa Cruz de la Palma |
| 17:30 | Vianney 29' (pen.); Malick 40' | Report | Ale González 14', 90+6'; Ribalta 75' | Stadium: Silvestre Carrillo; Attendance: 200; Referee: Martín Hernández |

=== Cantabria tournament ===
Eight teams joined the tournament. All matches were played in San Francisco Stadium, Reinosa.

Quarter-finals
20 August
Cayón (5) | 2
Guarnizo (5) | 1
21 August
Naval (5) (p) | 0 (5)
Torina (5) | 0 (3)
20 August
Tropezón (5) (p) | 1 (4)
Atlético Albericia (5) | 1 (3)
21 August
Escobedo (5) (p) | 0 (4)
Sámano (5) | 0 (3)

Semi-finals
27 August
Cayón (5) | 0
Naval (5) | 1
27 August
Tropezón (5) (p) | 0 (4)
Escobedo (5) | 0 (3)

Final
15 September
Naval (5) (p) | 0 (4)
Tropezón (5) | 0 (2)

==== Final ====
| 15 September | Naval (5) | 0–0 (4–2 p) | Tropezón (5) | Reinosa |
| 19:00 | | Report | | Stadium: San Francisco Stadium |

=== Castile-La Mancha tournament ===
Ten teams (Azuqueca (5), Calvo Sotelo (5), Conquense (5), Marchamalo (5), Socuéllamos (4), Talavera de la Reina (4), Toledo (5), Torrijos (5), Villarrobledo (5) and Villarrubia (5)) joined the XXI Trofeo Junta de Comunidades de Castilla-La Mancha, which also acted as the regional Copa RFEF tournament.

First round
10 August
Azuqueca (5) | 2
Marchamalo (5) | 3
13 August
Toledo (5) | 2
Torrijos (5) | 3
9 August
Conquense (5) (p) | 0 (4)
Villarrobledo (5) | 0 (1)
10 August
Villarrubia (5) (p) | 1 (2)
Calvo Sotelo (5) | 1 (1)

Quarter-finals
15 August
Marchamalo (5) | 2
Torrijos (5) | 0
17 August
Conquense (5) | 0 (1)
Villarrubia (5) (p) | 0 (3)

Semi-finals
21 August
Marchamalo (5) | 2
Talavera de la Reina (4) | 1
20 August
Villarrubia (5) (p) | 0 (4)
Socuéllamos (4) | 0 (3)

Final
28 August
Marchamalo (5) | 1 (4)
Villarrubia (5) (p) | 1 (5)

==== Final ====
| 28 August | Marchamalo (5) | 1–1 (4–5 p) | Villarrubia (5) | Marchamalo |
| 20:30 | Josemi 16' | Report | Álex Chico 90+5' (pen.) | Stadium: La Solana; Attendance: 700; Referee: Martínez de Osaba |

=== Castile and León tournament ===
Arandina (5), Atlético Bembibre (5), Cultural Leonesa (3), Salamanca (5), Santa Marta (5), Unionistas (3) and Zamora (4) joined the tournament.

Quarter-finals
12 August
Salamanca (5) | 0
Zamora (4) | 2
13 August
Arandina (5) | 0
Cultural Leonesa (3) | 6
13 August
Santa Marta (5) | 0
Unionistas (3) | 1

Semi-finals
20 August
Atlético Bembibre (5) | 1
Zamora (4) (a.e.t.) | 3
20 August
Cultural Leonesa (3) (a.e.t.) (p) | 1 (4)
Unionistas (3) | 1 (2)

Final
7 September
Zamora (4) | 2
Cultural Leonesa (3) | 0

==== Final ====
| 7 September | Zamora (4) | 2–0 | Cultural Leonesa (3) | Zamora |
| 20:30 | Francisco Panadero 'Pana' 18'; Juan Silva 72' | Report | Solís (penalty missed) 86' | Stadium: Ruta de la Plata |

=== Catalonia tournament ===
Badalona (5) and Terrassa (4) played the tournament.

| 28 August | Badalona (5) | 1–1 (a.e.t.) (3–4 p) | Terrassa (4) | Badalona |
| 19:00 | Sergio Rey 110' | Report | David Jiménez 93' | Stadium: Municipal |

=== Ceuta tournament ===
Betis de Hadú was directly selected by Federación de Fútbol de Ceuta due to sporting merits.

=== Extremadura tournament ===
8 teams registered for the tournament: Azuaga (5), Don Álvaro (5), Fuente de Cantos (5), Montehermoso (5), Plasencia (5), Trujillo (5), Villafranca (5) and Villanovense (4).

Quarter-finals
6 and 13 August
Fuen. de Cantos (5) (p) 4–3 | 1 | 0 | 1
Azuaga (5) | 1 | 0 | 1
7 and 12 August
Don Álvaro (5) | 1 | 0 | 1
Villafranca (5) | 0 | 3 | 3
Trujillo (5) (w.o.)
Villanovense (4)
7 and 13 August
Montehermoso (5) | 0 | 2 | 2
Plasencia (5) | 0 | 0 | 0

Semi-finals
21 and 28 August
Fuen. de Cantos (5) (p) 5–4 | 2 | 0 | 2
Villafranca (5) | 1 | 1 | 2
20 and 28 August
Trujillo (5) | 1 | 0 | 1
Montehermoso (5) | 0 | 0 | 0

Final
4 September
Fuente de Cantos (5) | 1
Trujillo (5) | 2

==== Final ====
| 4 September | Fuente de Cantos (5) | 1–2 | Trujillo (5) | Almendralejo |
| 20:00 | Araujo 81' | Report | Joselu 14'; Ñete 46' | Stadium: Francisco de la Hera; Attendance: 500; Referee: Fuentes Pérez |

=== Galicia tournament ===
A total of 8 teams joined the tournament.

Quarter-finals
10 August
Racing Villalbés (5) | 1 (3)
Silva (5) (p) | 1 (5)
14 August
Arzúa (5) | 1
Compostela (4) | 2
14 August
Estradense (5) (p) | 1 (4)
Arosa (5) | 1 (2)
13 August
Rápido Bouzas (5) | 1 (3)
Arenteiro (4) (p) | 1 (4)

Semi-finals
17 August
Silva (5) | 1 (4)
Compostela (4) (p) | 1 (5)
21 August
Estradense (5) | 0
Arenteiro (4) | 1

Final
27 August - Portonovo, Sanxenxo
Compostela (4) | 1
Arenteiro (4) | 2

==== Final ====
| 27 August | Compostela (4) | 1–2 | Arenteiro (4) | Portonovo, Sanxenxo |
| 20:00 | Mario Rodríguez 35' (pen.) | Report | Joseca 22'; Manín 85' | Stadium: Baltar; Referee: Oliveira Dios |

=== La Rioja tournament ===
Casalarreina (5), La Calzada (5), Náxara (5) and Varea (5) joined the tournament.

Semi-finals
27 August
Casalarreina (5) | 1 (4)
Náxara (5) (p) | 1 (5)
28 August
Varea (5) | 2
La Calzada (5) | 0

Final
4 September - Logroño
Náxara (5) | 1
Varea (5) | 0

==== Final ====
| 4 September | Náxara (5) | 1–0 | Varea (5) | Logroño |
| 12:00 | Miguel Martínez 62' | Report | | Stadium: Mundial 82; Referee: Oyón Hidalgo |

=== Madrid tournament ===
6 teams joined the tournament: Alcalá (5), Internacional (3), Móstoles URJC (5), San Sebastián de los Reyes (3), Torrejón (5) and Ursaria (5).

==== Group A ====
| Pos | Team | Pld | W | D | L | GF | GA | GD | Pts | Qualification | URS | SEB | INT |
|---|---|---|---|---|---|---|---|---|---|---|---|---|---|
| 1 | Ursaria | 1 | 1 | 0 | 0 | 1 | 0 | +1 | 3 | Qualified | — | 1–0 | — |
| 2 | San Sebastián de los Reyes | 1 | 0 | 0 | 1 | 0 | 1 | −1 | 0 | | — | — | (w.o.) |
| 3 | Internacional | 0 | 0 | 0 | 0 | 0 | 0 | 0 | 0 | | (w.o.) | — | — |

Updated to match(es) played on 24 August 2022. Source: Real Federación de Fútbol de Madrid
Rules for classification: 1) Points; 2) Goal difference; 3) Number of goals scored; 4) Head-to-head results.

==== Group B ====
| Pos | Team | Pld | W | D | L | GF | GA | GD | Pts | Qualification | ALC | TOR | MOS |
|---|---|---|---|---|---|---|---|---|---|---|---|---|---|
| 1 | Alcalá | 2 | 1 | 1 | 0 | 6 | 2 | +4 | 4 | Qualified | — | 1–1 | — |
| 2 | Torrejón | 2 | 1 | 1 | 0 | 4 | 3 | +1 | 4 | | — | — | 3–2 |
| 3 | Móstoles URJC | 2 | 0 | 0 | 2 | 3 | 8 | −5 | 0 | | 1–5 | — | — |

Updated to match(es) played on 24 August 2022. Source: Real Federación de Fútbol de Madrid
Rules for classification: 1) Points; 2) Goal difference; 3) Number of goals scored; 4) Head-to-head results.

==== Final ====
| 28 August | Ursaria (5) | 0–0 (a.e.t.) (2–4 p) | Alcalá (5) | Madrid |
| 11:00 | | Report | | Stadium: Ernesto Cotorruelo; Attendance: 200; Referee: López Montalbán |

=== Melilla tournament ===
Melilla was directly selected by Real Federación Melillense de Fútbol due to sporting merits.

=== Murcia tournament ===
Four teams joined the tournament.

Semi-finals
28 August
U. Molinense (5) (a.e.t.) (p) | 1 (4)
Ciudad Murcia (5) | 1 (2)
28 August
Lorca (5) | 3
Cieza (5) | 1

Final
4 September
Unión Molinense (5) | 0
Lorca (5) (a.e.t.) | 2

==== Final ====
| 4 September | Unión Molinense (5) | 0–2 (a.e.t.) | Lorca (5) | Molina de Segura |
| 19:00 | | Report | Dani Bermejo 94'; Mamadou Cellou 105' | Stadium: Sánchez Cánovas |

=== Navarre tournament ===
Eight teams joined the tournament.

Quarter-finals
24 August
Txantrea (5) | 2
Mutilvera (4) | 0
24 August
Tudelano (4) | 3
Peña Sport (5) | 1
24 August
Huarte (5) | 3
Pamplona (5) | 2
24 August
Ardoi (5) (a.e.t.) | 4
Cortes (5) | 2

Semi-finals
31 August
Txantrea (5) | 3
Tudelano (4) | 2
31 August
Huarte (5) | 3
Ardoi (5) | 2

Final
7 September - Zizur Mayor
Txantrea (5) | 1
Huarte (5) (a.e.t.) | 2

==== Final ====
| 7 September | Txantrea (5) | 1–2 (a.e.t.) | Huarte (5) | Zizur Mayor |
| 20:00 | Fermín García 33' | Report | Javi Martínez de Eulate 50'; Jon Galbete 114' | Stadium: El Pinar 1 |

=== Valencian Community tournament ===
6 teams joined the tournament: Alcoyano (3), Alzira (4), Atzeneta (5), Benigànim (6), Orihuela (5) and Silla (5).

==== Group A ====
| Pos | Team | Pld | W | D | L | GF | GA | GD | Pts | Qualification | ALC | ATZ | ORI |
|---|---|---|---|---|---|---|---|---|---|---|---|---|---|
| 1 | Alcoyano | 2 | 1 | 1 | 0 | 3 | 2 | +1 | 4 | Qualified | — | 1–1 | — |
| 2 | Atzeneta | 2 | 0 | 2 | 0 | 1 | 1 | 0 | 2 | | — | — | 0–0 |
| 3 | Orihuela | 2 | 0 | 1 | 1 | 1 | 2 | −1 | 1 | | 1–2 | — | — |

Updated to match(es) played on 20 August 2022. Source: Federació de Fútbol de la Comunitat Valenciana
Rules for classification: 1) Points; 2) Goal difference; 3) Number of goals scored; 4) Head-to-head results.

==== Group B ====
| Pos | Team | Pld | W | D | L | GF | GA | GD | Pts | Qualification | ALZ | BEN | SIL |
|---|---|---|---|---|---|---|---|---|---|---|---|---|---|
| 1 | Alzira | 2 | 1 | 0 | 1 | 1 | 1 | 0 | 3 | Qualified | — | 1–0 | — |
| 2 | Benigànim | 2 | 1 | 0 | 1 | 1 | 1 | 0 | 3 | | — | — | 1–0 |
| 3 | Silla | 2 | 1 | 0 | 1 | 1 | 1 | 0 | 3 | | 1–0 | — | — |

Updated to match(es) played on 20 August 2022. Source: Federació de Fútbol de la Comunitat Valenciana
Rules for classification: 1) Points; 2) Goal difference; 3) Number of goals scored; 4) Head-to-head results; 5) Penalty shoot-out.

==== Final ====
| 24 August | Alcoyano (3) | 1–2 | Alzira (4) | Algemesí |
| 20:00 | Rubio 49' | Report | Fernando Cortijo 17'; Álvaro Gómez 51' | Stadium: Municipal; Referee: José Miguel Carballa |

== National phase ==
National phase will be played between 28 September and 2 November with 32 teams (20 winners of the Regional Tournaments, the best 5 teams from 2021–22 Segunda División RFEF not yet qualified to 2022–23 Copa del Rey and the best 7 teams from 2021–22 Tercera División RFEF not yet qualified to 2022–23 Copa del Rey). The four semifinalists will qualify to 2022–23 Copa del Rey first round.

=== Qualified teams ===
- 5 best teams from 2021–22 Segunda División RFEF not yet qualified to 2022–23 Copa del Rey

- (Galicia (Spain)) Bergantiños (4)
- (Balearic Islands) Formentera (4)
- (Navarre) Izarra (4)
- (Region of Murcia) Mar Menor (4)
- (Andalusia) San Roque Lepe (4)

- 7 best teams from 2021–22 Tercera División RFEF not yet qualified to 2022–23 Copa del Rey

- (La Rioja) Anguiano (5)
- (Castilla–La Mancha) Illescas (5)
- (Aragon) Illueca (5)
- (Extremadura) Moralo (5)
- (Balearic Islands) Poblense (5)
- (Galicia (Spain)) Somozas (5)
- (Andalusia) Xerez (5)

- Winners of Autonomous Communities tournaments

- (Community of Madrid) Alcalá (5)
- (Valencian Community) Alzira (4)
- (Galicia (Spain)) Arenteiro (4)
- (Aragon) Atlético Monzón (5)
- (Asturias) Avilés (4)
- (Ceuta) Betis de Hadú (6)
- (Navarre) Huarte (5)
- (Region of Murcia) Lorca (5)
- (Andalusia) Marbella (5)
- Melilla (4)
- (Cantabria) Naval (5)
- (La Rioja) Náxara (5)
- (Canary Islands) Panadería Pulido (5)
- (Balearic Islands) Platges de Calvià (5)
- (Andalusia) Puente Genil (5)
- (Basque Country (autonomous community)) Real Unión (3)
- (Catalonia) Terrassa (4)
- (Extremadura) Trujillo (5)
- (Castilla–La Mancha) Villarrubia (5)
- (Castile and León) Zamora (4)

=== Draw ===
The draw for the entire tournament was made at the RFEF headquarters on 15 September. The teams were divided into four pots based on geographical criteria. Each pot will be played independently until the semi-finals.

| Pot A | Pot B | Pot C | Pot D |
|---|---|---|---|
| (Asturias) Avilés (4) (Canary Islands) Panadería Pulido (5) (Cantabria) Naval (5)^{†} (Castile and León) Zamora (4) (Galicia (Spain)) Arenteiro (4) (Galicia (Spain)) Bergantiños (4) (Galicia (Spain)) Somozas (5) (Community of Madrid) Alcalá (5) | (Aragon) Atlético Monzón (5) (Aragon) Illueca (5) (Basque Country (autonomous community)) Real Unión (3) (Catalonia) Terrassa (4) (La Rioja) Anguiano (5) (La Rioja) Náxara (5) (Navarre) Huarte (5) (Navarre) Izarra (4) | (Balearic Islands) Formentera (4) (Balearic Islands) Platges de Calvià (5) (Balearic Islands) Poblense (5) (Castilla–La Mancha) Illescas (5) (Castilla–La Mancha) Villarrubia (5) (Region of Murcia) Lorca (5) (Region of Murcia) Mar Menor (4) (Valencian Community) Alzira (4) | (Andalusia) Marbella (5) (Andalusia) Puente Genil (5) (Andalusia) San Roque Lepe (4) (Andalusia) Xerez (5) (Ceuta) Betis de Hadú (6) (Extremadura) Moralo (5) (Extremadura) Trujillo (5); Melilla (4) |

† The identity of this team was unknown at the time of the draw

=== Bracket ===
Round of 32
28 September
Alzira (4) | 2
Formentera (4) | 0
28 September
Poblense (5) | 0
Mar Menor (4) (a.e.t.) | 1
28 September
Villarrubia (5) | 2
Illescas (5) | 0
28 September
Platges de Calvià (5) | 2
Lorca (5) | 0
28 September
Puente Genil (5) | 0
San Roque Lepe (4) | 1
28 September
Xerez (5) | 0
Moralo (5) | 2
28 September
Marbella (5) | 11
Betis de Hadú (6) | 0
28 September
Trujillo (5) | 0 (4)
Melilla (4) (a.e.t.) (p) | 0 (5)
28 September
Arenteiro (4) (a.e.t.) | 3
Naval (5) | 1
28 September
Bergantiños (4) | 2
Zamora (4) (a.e.t.) | 3
28 September
Panadería Pulido (5) | 1
Somozas (5) | 0
28 September
Avilés (4) | 1 (4)
Alcalá (5) (a.e.t.) (p) | 1 (5)
28 September
Real Unión (3) | 1
Náxara (5) | 0
28 September
Anguiano (5) | 0
Illueca (5) | 1
28 September
Huarte (5) | 0
Terrassa (4) | 3
28 September
Izarra (4) | 2
Atlético Monzón (5) | 0

Round of 16
5 October
Alzira (4) | 2
Mar Menor (4) | 1
5 October
Villarrubia (5) | 2
Platges de Calvià (5) | 1
5 October
San Roque Lepe (4) | 1
Moralo (5) | 0
5 October
Marbella (5) | 1
Melilla (4) (a.e.t.) | 2
5 October
Arenteiro (4) | 2
Zamora (4) | 1
5 October
Panadería Pulido (5) | 1
Alcalá (5) | 0
5 October
Real Unión (3) | 2
Illueca (5) | 0
5 October
Terrassa (4) (a.e.t.) (p) | 2 (5)
Izarra (4) | 2 (3)

Quarter-finals
12 October
Alzira (4) (a.e.t.) (p) | 1 (7)
Villarrubia (5) | 1 (6)
12 October
San Roque Lepe (4) (a.e.t.) | 2
Melilla (4) | 1
12 October
Arenteiro (4) | 3
Panadería Pulido (5) | 0
12 October
Real Unión (3) | 1
Terrassa (4) | 0

Semi-finals
19 October
Alzira (4) (a.e.t.) (p) | 2 (4)
San Roque Lepe (4) | 2 (3)
19 October
Arenteiro (4) | 2
Real Unión (3) | 0

Final
2 November
Alzira (4) | 0
Arenteiro (4) (a.e.t.) | 2

=== Round of 32 ===
Pot A

| 28 September | Arenteiro (4) | 3–1 (a.e.t.) | Naval (5) | O Carballiño |
| 20:30 | Marcos Alonso Rodríguez 'Marquitos' 32', 104'; Luis Gonzaga Delage Cruzado 'Manín' 117' | Report | Jorge Manuel Romay Santiago (o.g.) 89' | Stadium: Espiñedo; Referee: Álvarez Rodríguez (Castile and León) |

| 28 September | Bergantiños (4) | 2–3 (a.e.t.) | Zamora (4) | Carballo |
| 20:00 | Juan Ignacio Brunet 36'; Iván Garrido Ciaurriz 90+3' | Report | Alejandro Altube Suárez 59', 78'; Dani Hernández 94' (pen.) | Stadium: As Eiroas; Referee: Rodríguez García (Asturias) |

| 28 September | Panadería Pulido (5) | 1–0 | Somozas (5) | Vega de San Mateo |
| 22:50 (21:50 Canarian Time) | Raúl Sosa Curbelo 58' | Report | | Stadium: San Mateo |

| 28 September | Avilés (4) | 1–1 (a.e.t.) (4–5 p) | Alcalá (5) | Avilés |
| 20:00 | Miquel Alorda 117' | Report | Marcos Javier Legaz Paleo 100' | Stadium: Román Suárez Puerta; Attendance: 600; Referee: López Fernández (Galicia) |

Pot B

| 28 September | Real Unión (3) | 1–0 | Náxara (5) | Irun |
| 19:30 | Julen Aguirre Frías 8' | Report | | Stadium: Stadium Gal; Attendance: 800; Referee: Crespo Puente (Cantabria) |

| 28 September | Anguiano (5) | 0–1 | Illueca (5) | Logroño |
| 20:00 | | | Rubén Marín Gaspar 'Gorri' 45' | Stadium: Mundial 82; Referee: Urizar Díaz (Basque Country) |

| 28 September | Huarte (5) | 0–3 | Terrassa (4) | Huarte |
| 19:00 | | Report | Carlos Martínez Ruiz 23'; Àlex Fernández Jofresa 55' (pen.); Pablo Javier Servetti Rodríguez 90+3' | Stadium: Areta; Referee: Ramírez Marco (Aragon) |

| 28 September | Izarra (4) | 2–0 | Atlético Monzón (5) | Estella-Lizarra |
| 19:45 | Daniel Fernández Parra 45'; Alejandro Galdeano ‘Bicho’ 74' | Report | | Stadium: Merkatondoa; Attendance: 100; Referee: Lázaro Martínez (La Rioja) |

Pot C

| 28 September | Alzira (4) | 2–0 | Formentera (4) | Alzira |
| 20:00 | Juan Carlos Fernández Marín 'Pitu' 14'; Javier Soler Gandía 70' | Report | | Stadium: Luis Suñer Picó; Attendance: 400; Referee: Moreno Muñoz (Murcia) |

| 28 September | Poblense (5) | 0–1 (a.e.t.) | Mar Menor (4) | Sa Pobla |
| 19:00 | | Report | Dani Aquino 118' | Stadium: Nou Camp; Referee: Carrero Romera (Catalonia) |

| 28 September | Villarrubia (5) | 2–0 | Illescas (5) | Villarrubia de los Ojos |
| 20:30 | Alejandro Díez Gutiérrez 'Álex Díez' 32'; Alejandro Roy Gajón 63' | Report | | Stadium: Municipal; Attendance: 400; Referee: Muñoz Blázquez (Extremadura) |

| 28 September | Platges de Calvià (5) | 2–0 | Lorca (5) | Calvià |
| 20:00 | Alejandro Rocca Martínez 30'; Blai Pons Jiménez 90' | Report | | Stadium: Magaluf |

Pot D

| 28 September | Puente Genil (5) | 0–1 | San Roque Lepe (4) | Puente Genil |
| 20:30 | | Report | Antonio Jesús López Mora 86' | Stadium: Manuel Polinario "Poli"; Attendance: 900; Referee: Ciruelos Esteban (Castile-La Mancha) |

| 28 September | Xerez (5) | 0–2 | Moralo (5) | Jerez de la Frontera |
| 20:30 | | Report | Luismi Cruz 5'; Rubén Colmenero Abad 'Buben' 44' | Stadium: Pedro S. Garrido; Referee: Escobar López (Canary Islands) |

| 28 September | Marbella (5) | 11–0 | Betis de Hadú (6) | Marbella |
| 17:00 | | | | Stadium: Estadio Municipal de Marbella |

| 28 September | Trujillo (5) | 0–0 (a.e.t.) (4–5 p) | Melilla (4) | Trujillo |
| 20:30 | | | | Stadium: Municipal |

=== Round of 16 ===
Pot A

| 5 October | Arenteiro (4) | 2–1 | Zamora (4) | O Carballiño |
| 20:30 | Luis Gonzaga Delage Cruzado 'Manín' 24'; Germán Novoa Enríquez 64' | Report | Francisco Javier Panadero 42' | Stadium: Espiñedo; Referee: Agudo Daza (Asturias) |

| 5 October | Panadería Pulido (5) | 1–0 | Alcalá (5) | Vega de San Mateo |
| 20:00 (19:00 Canarian Time) | Alejandro González Hernández 19' | Report | | Stadium: San Mateo; Attendance: 400; Referee: Lidón Rocamora (Valencia) |

Pot B

| 5 October | Real Unión (3) | 2–0 | Illueca (5) | Irun |
| 19:30 | Chema Núñez 32'; Aitor Seguín 49' | Report | | Stadium: Stadium Gal; Attendance: 400; Referee: López Romera (Navarre) |

| 5 October | Terrassa (4) | 2–2 (a.e.t.) (5–3 p) | Izarra (4) | Terrassa |
| 19:00 | Pablo Javier Servetti Rodríguez 75'; Aythami Perera García 117' | Report | Julen Madariaga Pascual 36'; Dani Fernández 120' | Stadium: Olímpic; Attendance: 620; Referee: Angelov Borisov (Balearic Islands) |

Pot C

| 5 October | Alzira (4) | 2–1 | Mar Menor (4) | Alzira |
| 20:00 | Juan Carlos Fernández Marín 'Pitu' 22'; Marcos Blasco Devesa 68' | Report | Rognny Elegua Rodríguez 55' | Stadium: Camp d'Esports Venècia; Attendance: 700; Referee: Montoro Ferreiro (Catalonia) |

| 5 October | Villarrubia (5) | 2–1 | Platges de Calvià (5) | Villarrubia de los Ojos |
| 19:30 | Samuel Tetteh Yemoh 13'; Abdulla Lloyd Washington 82' | Report | Adri Marín 43' | Stadium: Municipal; Attendance: 400; Referee: Ojaos Valera (Murcia) |

Pot D

| 5 October | San Roque Lepe (4) | 1–0 | Moralo (5) | Lepe |
| 20:30 | Álvaro Vázquez 9' | Report | | Stadium: Ciudad de Lepe; Referee: Montes García-Navas (Madrid) |

| 5 October | Marbella (5) | 1–2 (a.e.t.) | Melilla (4) | Marbella |
| 16:30 | | | | Stadium: Estadio Municipal de Marbella |

=== Quarter-finals ===
Winners will qualify to the 2022–23 Copa del Rey first round.

Pot A

| 12 October | Arenteiro (4) | 3–0 | Panadería Pulido (5) | O Carballiño |
| 18:00 | | | | Stadium: Espiñedo |

Pot B

| 12 October | Real Unión (3) | 1–0 | Terrassa (4) | Irun |
| 17:00 | | | | Stadium: Stadium Gal |

Pot C

| 12 October | Alzira (4) | 1–1 (a.e.t.) (7–6 p) | Villarrubia (5) | Alzira |
| 19:00 | | | | Stadium: Luis Suñer Picó |

Pot D

| 12 October | San Roque Lepe (4) | 2–1 (a.e.t.) | Melilla (4) | Lepe |
| 12:00 | | | | Stadium: Ciudad de Lepe |

=== Semi-finals ===
| 19 October | Arenteiro (4) | 2–0 | Real Unión (3) | O Carballiño |
| 20:30 | | | | Stadium: Espiñedo |

| 19 October | Alzira (4) | 2–2 (a.e.t.) (4–3 p) | San Roque Lepe (4) | Alzira |
| 20:00 | | | | Stadium: Luis Suñer Picó |

=== Final ===
| 2 November | Alzira (4) | 0–2 (a.e.t.) | Arenteiro (4) | Alzira |
| 19:30 | | | | Stadium: Luis Suñer Picó |
