= 2010 Tercera División play-offs =

Spanish football league play-offs

The 2010 Tercera División play-offs to Segunda División B from Tercera División (Promotion play-offs) were the final playoffs for the promotion from 2009–10 Tercera División to 2010–11 Segunda División B. The first four teams in each group (excluding reserve teams) took part in the play-off.

== Format ==
The eighteen group winners had the opportunity to be promoted directly to Segunda División B. The eighteen group winners were drawn into a two-legged series where the nine winners promoted to Segunda División B. The nine losing clubs entered the play-off round for the last nine promotion spots.

The eighteen runners-up were drawn against one of the seventeen fourth-placed clubs outside their group and the eighteen third-placed clubs were drawn against one another in a two-legged series. The twenty-seven winners advanced with the nine losing clubs from the champions' series to determine the eighteen teams that entered the last two-legged series for the last nine promotion spots. In all the playoff series, the lower-ranked club played at home first. Whenever there was a tie in position (e.g. like the group winners in the champions' series or the third-placed teams in the first round), a draw determined the club to play at home first.

== Teams for 2009–10 play-offs ==
- All groups as 38 of 38 rounds.
- The teams highlighted in yellow played the play-offs to Segunda División B.
- The teams highlighted in red were relegated to Divisiones Regionales.

| Teams - Group 1 (Galicia) | Pts |
|---|---|
| Deportivo B | 82 |
| Cerceda | 70 |
| Ourense | 68 |
| Coruxo | 64 |
| Lalín | 38 |
| Céltiga | 36 |
| Verín | 15 |
| Ciudad Santiago | (R) |

| Teams - Group 2 (Asturias) | Pts |
|---|---|
| Caudal Deportivo | 83 |
| Marino de Luanco | 80 |
| Universidad de Oviedo | 76 |
| Llanes | 70 |
| Colloto | 35 |
| Covadonga | 33 |
| Astur | 21 |

| Teams - Group 3 (Cantabria) | Pts |
|---|---|
| Noja | 80 |
| Escobedo | 72 |
| Tropezón | 71 |
| Bezana | 70 |
| Barreda | 35 |
| Textil Escudo | 33 |
| Atlético Deva | 24 |

| Teams - Group 4 (Basque C.) | Pts |
|---|---|
| Real Sociedad B | 75 |
| Portugalete | 69 |
| Amorebieta | 68 |
| Elgoibar | 65 |
| Aretxabaleta | 41 |
| Retuerto Sport | 26 |
| Salvatierra | 13 |

| Teams - Group 5(Catalonia) | Pts |
|---|---|
| L'Hospitalet | 86 |
| Reus Deportiu | 83 |
| Santboià | 70 |
| Prat | 67 |
| Rapitenca | 34 |
| Blanes | 27 |
| Olesa Montserrat | 26 |

| Teams - Group 6 (Valencian C.) | Pts |
|---|---|
| Gandía | 69 |
| Alzira | 69 |
| Novelda | 65 |
| Villarreal C | 65 |
| Elche Ilicitano | 34 |
| Onda | 31 |
| Alicante B | 30 |

| Teams - Group 7 (C. of Madrid) | Pts |
|---|---|
| Rayo B | 85 |
| Parla | 74 |
| Getafe B | 70 |
| Trival Valderas | 69 |
| Arganda | 39 |
| Santa Ana | 30 |
| Ciempozuelos | 24 |
| Galáctico Pegaso | 20 |

| Teams - Group 8 (C. and León) | Pts |
|---|---|
| Burgos | 90 |
| Real Valladolid B | 85 |
| Arandina | 72 |
| Real Ávila | 69 |
| Salamanca B | 34 |
| La Granja | 28 |
| Cultural Leonesa B | 27 |

| Teams - Group 9 (E. Andalusia) | Pts |
|---|---|
| Atl. Mancha Real | 68 |
| Motril | 66 |
| El Palo | 63 |
| Almería B | 61 |
| Arenas Armilla | 35 |
| Poli Ejido B | (R) |
| Vera | (R) |

| Teams - Group 10 (W. Andalusia) | Pts |
|---|---|
| Alcalá | 80 |
| Mairena | 70 |
| Ayamonte | 69 |
| Marinaleda | 66 |
| Murallas Ceuta | 41 |
| Dos Hermanas | 19 |
| Cartaya | 18 |

| Teams - Group 11 (Balearic I.) | Pts |
|---|---|
| Atlético Baleares | 81 |
| Santa Eulalia | 78 |
| Constancia | 74 |
| Ferriolense | 66 |
| Independiente | 37 |
| Esporles | 27 |
| Atlètic Ciutadella | 19 |

| Teams - Group 12 (Canary I.) | Pts |
|---|---|
| Corralejo Baku | 79 |
| Las Palmas Atlético | 74 |
| Pájara Playas | 74 |
| Marino | 70 |
| Charco Pino | 46 |
| Gáldar | 40 |
| Llanos Aridane | 36 |
| Universidad L.P. B | 32 |
| Fuerteventura | (R) |

| Teams - Group 13 (Murcia) | Pts |
|---|---|
| Jumilla | 86 |
| Yeclano | 84 |
| Lorca Deportiva | 84 |
| Costa Cálida | 83 |
| Mazarrón | 28 |
| Lumbreras | 18 |
| Cuarto Distrito | 14 |

| Teams - Group 14(Extremadura) | Pts |
|---|---|
| Badajoz | 101 |
| Jerez | 89 |
| Extremadura UD | 79 |
| Arroyo | 74 |
| Montehermoso | 30 |
| La Estrella | 27 |
| Villafranca | 23 |

| Teams - Group 15 (Navarre) | Pts |
|---|---|
| Tudelano | 92 |
| Peña Sport | 89 |
| Atlético Cirbonero | 73 |
| Iruña | 73 |
| Atlético Valtierrano | 43 |
| Zarramonza | 41 |
| Cortes | 37 |

| Teams - Group 16 (La Rioja) | Pts |
|---|---|
| Oyonesa | 90 |
| Alfaro | 89 |
| Haro | 88 |
| Anguiano | 83 |
| Villegas | 31 |
| Yagüe | 23 |
| Alberite | 20 |

| Teams - Group 17 (Aragon) | Pts |
|---|---|
| Teruel | 94 |
| La Muela | 90 |
| Real Zaragoza B | 84 |
| Ejea | 84 |
| Cuarte Industrial | 35 |
| Alcañiz | 35 |
| Fraga | 34 |
| Jacetano | 30 |

| Teams - Group 18 (Castile-La Mancha) | Pts |
|---|---|
| La Roda | 77 |
| Illescas | 68 |
| Azuqueca | 65 |
| Talavera | 62 |
| Gimnástico Alcázar | 43 |
| Mora | 41 |
| Daimiel | 29 |

== Eliminatories ==
- The regular season ended on the 9 May 2010.
- The draw of play-offs were held in the RFEF headquarters on 10 May at 17:30. (CEST+2).
- The play-offs began on the 15 May and will end on the 20 June 2010.

=== 1st eliminatory ===
For 1st of group only.

Home Matches:
15 May 2010
| Rayo B | 0–0 | L'Hospitalet |
| Noja | 1–1 | Teruel |
| Atl. Mancha Real | 2–1 | Badajoz |
| Burgos | 0–0 | Deportivo B |
| Gandía | 2–1 | La Roda |
16 May 2010
| Atlético Baleares | 1–0 | Tudelano |
| Corralejo | 2–0 | Alcalá |
| Caudal | 2–0 | Jumilla |
| Real Sociedad B | 3–0 | Oyonesa |

Away Matches:
22 May 2010
| Deportivo B | 0–0 | Burgos | Agg:0–0//Pen:3–0 |
| La Roda | 1–1 | Gandía | Agg:2–3 |
23 May 2010
| Tudelano | 2–1 | Atlético Baleares | Agg:2–2 |
| Alcalá | 3–0 | Corralejo | Agg:3–2 |
| Oyonesa | 0–1 | Real Sociedad B | Agg:0–4 |
| Teruel | 2–1 | Noja | Agg:3–2 |
| Badajoz | 1–0 | Atl. Mancha Real | Agg:2–2 |
| Jumilla | 1–1 | Caudal | Agg:1–3 |
| L'Hospitalet | 1–1 | Rayo B | Agg:1–1 |

- Promoted to Segunda División B:Deportivo B, Gandía, Atlético Baleares, Alcalá, Real Sociedad B, Teruel, Badajoz, Caudal and Rayo B
- Losers:Burgos, La Roda, Tudelano, Corralejo, Oyonesa, Noja, Atl. Mancha Real, Jumilla and L'Hospitalet, continue in the 2nd eliminatory

=== 1st eliminatory (2nd, 3rd and 4th of group) ===
For 2nd, 3rd and 4th of group only. 2nds played against 4ths and 3rds played against each other.

Home Matches:
15 May 2010
| Ferriolense | 0–0 | Mairena |
| Iruña | 1–2 | Illescas |
| Elgoibar | 0–1 | Marino de Luanco |
| Azuqueca | 1–1 | Universidad Oviedo |
| Ejea | 1–1 | Alzira |
| Marinaleda | 1–2 | Las Palmas Atl. |
| Santboià | 1–0 | Arandina |
| Ayamonte | 5–1 | Atl. Cirbonero |
16 May 2010
| Tropezón | 2–1 | Pájara Playas |
| Getafe B | 2–0 | Zaragoza B |
| Almería B | 2–1 | Santa Eulàlia |
| Trival Valderas | 2–0 | Yeclano |
| Prat | 0–1 | Peña Sport |
| Llanes | 1–2 | Valladolid B |
| Talavera | 1–0 | Reus Deportiu |
| Lorca Deportiva | 1–1 | Haro |
| Bezana | 0–1 | Motril |
| Marino | 0–2 | La Muela |
| Anguiano | 0–2 | Portugalete |
| Real Ávila | 1–1 | Escobedo |
| Costa Cálida | 1–3 | Cerceda |
| Villarreal C | 1–1 | Jerez |
| Arroyo | 3–1 | Alfaro |
| Extremadura | 0–0 | Novelda |
| Ourense | 1–0 | Constancia |
| Amorebieta | 3–0 | El Palo |
| Coruxo | 3–0 | Parla |

Away Matches:
22 May 2010
| Pájara Playas | 3–0 | Tropezón | Agg:4–2 |
| Haro | 2–1 | Lorca Deportiva | Agg:3–2 |
| Atl. Cirbonero | 3–1 | Ayamonte | Agg:4–6 |
| Escobedo | 1–2 | Real Ávila | Agg:2–3 |
| Marino de Luanco | 2–0 | Elgoibar | Agg:3–0 |
| Illescas | 4–0 | Iruña | Agg:6–1 |
| Alzira | 0–0 | Ejea | Agg:1–1 |
| Arandina | 1–1 | Santboià | Agg:1–2 |
23 May 2010
| Portugalete | 0–0 | Anguiano | Agg:2–0 |
| Mairena | 2–0 | Ferriolense | Agg:2–0 |
| Las Palmas Atl. | 2–0 | Marinaleda | Agg:4–1 |
| Parla | 3–2 | Coruxo | Agg:3–5 |
| Valladolid B | 1–3 | Llanes | Agg:3–4 |
| La Muela | 1–0 | Marino | Agg:3–0 |
| Universidad Oviedo | 0–1 | Azuqueca | Agg:1–2 |
| Constancia | 2–0 | Ourense | Agg:2–1 |
| Cerceda | 1–0 | Costa Cálida | Agg:4–1 |
| El Palo | 2–1 | Amorebieta | Agg:2–4 |
| Peña Sport | 1–0 | Prat | Agg:2–0 |
| Zaragoza B | 1–1 | Getafe B | Agg:1–3 |
| Reus Deportiu | 2–0 | Talavera | Agg:2–1 |
| Santa Eulàlia | 2–2 | Almería B | Agg:3–4 |
| Alfaro | 4–0 | Arroyo | Agg:5–3 |
| Novelda | 1–1 | Extremadura | Agg:1–1 |
| Jerez | 0–0 | Villarreal C | Agg:1–1 |
| Motril | 1–1 | Bezana | Agg:2–1 |
| Yeclano | 5–1 | Trival Valderas | Agg:5–3 |

=== 2nd eliminatory ===
Winners of 1st eliminatory (2nd, 3rd and 4th of group) (27 teams) and losers of 1st eliminatory (1st of group) (9 teams).

Home Matches:
29 May 2010
| Amorebieta | 1–1 | La Roda |
| Azuqueca | 1–0 | L'Hospitalet |
| Ayamonte | 0–0 | Alzira |
30 May 2010
| Santboià | 0–0 | Corralejo |
| Getafe B | 0–0 | Jumilla |
| Almería B | 0–0 | Burgos |
| Pájara Playas | 1–0 | Yeclano |
| Constancia | 0–1 | La Muela |
| Marino de Luanco | 1–3 | Las Palmas Atl. |
| Coruxo | 2–1 | Oyonesa |
| Alfaro | 1–0 | Cerceda |
| Reus Deportiu | 2–1 | Jerez |
| Peña Sport | 1–1 | Motril |
| Real Ávila | 0–0 | Atl. Mancha Real |
| Extremadura | 0–0 | Mairena |
| Haro | 1–1 | Noja |
| Llanes | 2–2 | Tudelano |
| Illescas | 0–0 | Portugalete |

Away Matches:
5 June 2010
| Alzira | 1–0 | Ayamonte | Agg:1–0 |
| Yeclano | 2–0 | Pájara Playas | Agg:2–1 |
| L'Hospitalet | 3–1 | Azuqueca | Agg:3–2 |
6 June 2010
| Portugalete | 2–1 | Illescas | Agg:2–1 |
| La Muela | 1–1 | Constancia | Agg:2–1 |
| Tudelano | 6–0 | Llanes | Agg:8–2 |
| Corralejo | 1–1 | Santboià | Agg:1–1 |
| Las Palmas Atl. | 3–2 | Marino de Luanco | Agg:6–3 |
| Oyonesa | 1–1 | Coruxo | Agg:2–3 |
| Jerez | 1–0 | Reus Deportiu | Agg:2–2 |
| Cerceda | 3–0 | Alfaro | Agg:3–1 |
| Mairena | 2–2 | Extremadura | Agg:2–2 |
| Motril | 2–2 | Peña Sport | Agg:3–3 |
| Atl. Mancha Real | 2–0 | Real Ávila | Agg:2–0 |
| Noja | 1–1 | Haro | Agg:1–1//Pen:4–5 |
| Jumilla | 1–2 | Getafe B | Agg:1–2 |
| La Roda | 2–1 | Amorebieta | Agg:3–2 |
| Burgos | 1–2 | Almería B | Agg:1–2 |

=== 3rd eliminatory ===
Winners of 2nd eliminatory.

Home Matches:
12 June 2010
| Haro | 0–1 | Yeclano |
13 June 2010
| Getafe B | 1–0 | Portugalete |
| Almería B | 1–1 | L'Hospitalet |
| Las Palmas Atl. | 1–1 | Peña Sport |
| Extremadura | 4–2 | Atl. Mancha Real |
| Coruxo | 2–0 | La Roda |
| Cerceda | 2–2 | La Muela |
| Santboià | 2–1 | Tudelano |
| Alzira | 3–0 | Jerez |

Away Matches:
19 June 2010
| Portugalete | 2–2 | Getafe B | Agg:2–3 |
| Yeclano | 0–1 | Haro | Agg:1–1//Pen:5–3 |
| La Roda | 1–1 | Coruxo | Agg:1–3 |
20 June 2010
| Tudelano | 2–1 | Santboià | Agg:3–3//Pen:3–4 |
| La Muela | 1–0 | Cerceda | Agg:3–2 |
| Jerez | 2–3 | Alzira | Agg:2–6 |
| Peña Sport | 2–1 | Las Palmas Atl. | Agg:3–2 |
| Atl. Mancha Real | 0–0 | Extremadura | Agg:2–4 |
| L'Hospitalet | 0–0 | Almería B | Agg:1–1 |

- Promoted to Segunda División B:Getafe B, Yeclano, Coruxo, Santboià, La Muela, Alzira, Peña Sport, Extremadura and L'Hospitalet

== See also ==
- 2010 Segunda División B play-offs
