= Juan Mazzocchi =

Argentine footballer

Personal information
- Full name: Juan Manuel Mazzocchi
- Date of birth: 8 June 1997 (age 29)
- Place of birth: Baradero, Argentina
- Position: Forward

Team information
- Current team: La Nucía

Youth career
- Villa Dálmine

Senior career*
Years	Team	Apps	(Gls)
2016–2018	Villa Dálmine	37	(5)
2018	→ Albacete B (loan)	8	(1)
2018–2019	La Solana	15	(4)
2019–2020	Quintanar del Rey	24	(9)
2020–2021	Tarancón	20	(7)
2021–2022	Villacañas	28	(12)
2022–2023	Quintanar del Rey	34	(15)
2023–2024	Villacañas	17	(4)
2024–2025	Toledo	29	(6)
2025–	La Nucía	8	(3)
- * Club domestic league appearances and goals as of 26 October 2025

Juan Manuel Mazzocchi (born 8 June 1997) is an Argentine footballer who plays for Spanish Tercera Federación club La Nucía as a forward.

== Club career ==
Born in Baradero, Buenos Aires, Mazzocchi represented Villa Dálmine as a youth. On 18 June 2016 he made his first team debut, coming on as a second-half substitute and scoring his team's third in a 4–1 Primera B Nacional home routing of Sportivo Estudiantes.

Mazzocchi started to feature regularly during the 2016–17 season, scoring four goals in 35 matches. On 24 January 2018 he moved abroad, signing for Spanish club Albacete Balompié and immediately assigned to the reserves in Tercera División.
