= José Ángel Gascón =

Spanish footballer

Personal information
- Full name: José Ángel Gascón Martín
- Date of birth: 15 March 1985 (age 41)
- Place of birth: Ciudad Real, Spain
- Height: 1.80 m (5 ft 11 in)
- Position: Midfielder

Youth career
- Sporting Gijón

Senior career*
Years	Team	Apps	(Gls)
2004–2005	Sporting B		
2005–2006	Alhaurino		
2006–2007	Málaga B	17	(0)
2006–2007	Málaga	16	(2)
2007	Alcorcón	8	(0)
2008–2010	Osasuna B	73	(1)
2010–2011	Jaén	12	(1)
2011–2012	Guijuelo	37	(4)
2012–2013	Ontinyent	24	(0)
2013–2014	Extremadura		
2014–2017	Almagro		
2017–2018	Atlético Tomelloso	38	(2)
2018–2020	Almagro	35	(4)
2020–2022	Manzanares	32	(8)
2022–2023	Valdepeñas	5	(2)
- * Club domestic league appearances and goals

José Ángel Gascón Martín (born 15 March 1985) is a Spanish former footballer who played as a midfielder.
