= Rubén Sánchez (footballer, born 1994) =

Spanish footballer

Personal information
- Full name: Rubén Sánchez Pérez-Cejuela
- Date of birth: 25 November 1994 (age 31)
- Place of birth: Sonseca, Spain
- Height: 1.86 m (6 ft 1 in)
- Position: Forward

Team information
- Current team: Buriram United
- Number: 28

Youth career
- 2009–2010: Toledo
- 2010–2011: Sonseca
- 2011–2013: Toledo

Senior career*
Years	Team	Apps	(Gls)
2013–2016	Toledo	29	(1)
2016–2017	Sporting Gijón	2	(0)
2017–2018	Sporting Atlético	25	(10)
2018–2020	Granada	47	(8)
2020–2022	Rayo Majadahonda	57	(10)
2022	Surkhon Termez	12	(8)
2023–2025	AGMK	57	(13)
2025-	Buriram United	6	(2)
- * Club domestic league appearances and goals as of 30 November 2025

Rubén Sánchez Pérez-Cejuela (born 25 November 1994) is a Spanish footballer who plays for Thai League 1 club Buriram United as a forward.

== Club career ==
Born in Sonseca, Toledo, Castile-La Mancha, Sánchez graduated from CD Toledo's youth setup, after stints at AD Diana and CD Sonseca. After appearing with the former's reserve team, he made his first team debut on 25 August 2013 by coming on as a substitute for Rufino in a 1–3 Segunda División B away loss against UB Conquense.

Sánchez scored his first and only goal for Toledo on 1 September 2013, netting a last-minute equalizer in a 1–1 home draw against SD Huesca. The following 25 July, he renewed his contract until 2017, but remained assigned to the B-side; he was only promoted to the main squad in August 2015.

On 18 July 2016 Sánchez joined another reserve team, Sporting de Gijón in Tercera División. After scoring ten goals in only 18 matches (which included braces against CD Praviano and CD Mosconia in October), he made his first team debut on 21 December, replacing Burgui and scoring his team's only goal in a 1–3 loss at SD Eibar for the season's Copa del Rey.

Sánchez made his La Liga debut on 7 January 2017, again from the bench in a 0–1 away loss against UD Las Palmas. On 7 July he moved to another reserve team, Granada CF in the third division.

In July 2020, he signed for the Rayo Majadahonda of Segunda División, with which he played two seasons with a balance of 57 games and 11 goals.

=== Surkhon Termez ===
On July 18, 2022, he signed for Surkhon Termez of the Uzbekistan Super League, with whom he scored 8 goals in 14 games.

=== AGMK ===
On January 31, 2023, he signs for AGMK of the Uzbekistan Super League. 1.5-year contract was signed between AGMK and Ruben Sanchez.

== Career statistics ==
=== Club ===
As of match played 1 December 2024

Appearances and goals by club, season and competition
Club	Season	League			National cup		Continental		Other		Total	
Club	Season	Division	Apps	Goals	Apps	Goals	Apps	Goals	Apps	Goals	Apps	Goals
Toledo	2013–14	Segunda División B	7	1	1	0	–		–		8	1
Toledo	2014–15	Segunda División B	10	0	1	0	–		–		11	0
Toledo	2015–16	Segunda División B	12	0	0	0	–		–		12	0
Sporting Gijón	2016–17	La Liga	2	0	1	1	–		–		3	1
Sporting Atlético	2017–18	Segunda División B	25	10	0	0	–		–		25	10
Granada	2018–19	Segunda División	24	2	0	0	–		–		24	2
Granada	2019–20	Segunda División	23	6	0	0	–		–		23	6
Rayo Majadahonda	2020–21	Segunda División	23	4	0	0	–		–		23	4
Rayo Majadahonda	2021–22	Segunda División	34	6	3	1	–		–		37	7
Surkhon Termez	2022	Uzbekistan Super League	12	8	1	0	–		–		13	8
AGMK	2023	Uzbekistan Super League	19	4	5	5	4	1 (Note: Appearances in AFC Champions League)	–		27	10
AGMK	2024	Uzbekistan Super League	14	4	0	0	–		–		14	4
AGMK	2025	Uzbekistan Super League	0	0	0	0	0	0	–		0	0
Career total			105	45	12	7	4	1	–		222	53
