= Pablo Buendía =

Spanish footballer (born 1986)

Personal information
- Full name: Pablo Buendía Elvira
- Date of birth: 2 January 1986 (age 40)
- Place of birth: Albacete, Spain
- Height: 1.91 m (6 ft 3 in)
- Position: Defender

Team information
- Current team: Atlético Tomelloso

Youth career
- Albacete

Senior career*
Years	Team	Apps	(Gls)
2005–2010	Albacete B		
2008	Albacete	1	(0)
2010–2011	Hapoel Ramat Gan	1	(0)
2011	Almansa	9	(0)
2011–2012	La Roda	10	(0)
2012–2013	Almansa	30	(0)
2013–2015	Socuéllamos	30	(0)
2015–	→ Quintanar Rey (loan)	16	(0)
2015–2016	Novelda	13	(0)
2016	Jove Español	11	(0)
2016–	Atlético Tomelloso	0	(0)
- * Club domestic league appearances and goals as of 15 May 2016

Pablo Buendía Elvira (born 2 January 1986) is a Spanish footballer who plays for CD Atlético Tomelloso as a defender.

== Club career ==
Born in Albacete, Castilla-La Mancha, Buendía graduated from Albacete Balompié's youth setup, and made his senior debuts with local the reserves in the 2005–06 campaign, in Tercera División. On 24 May 2008 he made his professional debut.

In the 2010 summer Buendía moved abroad, joining Israeli Premier League side Hapoel Ramat Gan Giv'atayim F.C. In January 2011 he returned to his country, signing for UD Almansa, in the fourth level.

In the following years Buendía competed in Segunda División B but also in the fourth division, representing La Roda CF, Almansa and UD Socuéllamos. With the latter he achieved promotion at the end of the 2013–14 season, appearing in 30 matches but never scoring any goals.
