= Johan Montes =

Venezuelan footballer (born 2000)

Personal information
- Full name: Johan Enrique Montes Quintero
- Date of birth: 4 January 2000 (age 26)
- Place of birth: Maracay, Venezuela
- Height: 1.75 m (5 ft 9 in)
- Position: Defender

Team information
- Current team: Montijo

Youth career
- –2018: Aragua

Senior career*
Years	Team	Apps	(Gls)
2017–2018	Aragua	18	(0)
2019	Monagas	1	(0)
2019–2020	Alcorcón C		
2020–2021	CD Nueva Ciudad		
2021–2022	Mérida	6	(0)
2022–2023	Atlético Tomelloso	27	(0)
2023–2024	Arroyo	33	(0)
2024–	Montijo	2	(0)
- * Club domestic league appearances and goals as of 15 September 2024

Johan Enrique Montes Quintero (born 4 January 2000) is a Venezuelan professional footballer who plays as a defender for Spanish club Montijo.
