= Daimiel CF =

Spanish football club

Daimiel
- Full name: Daimiel Club de Fútbol
- Founded: 1942
- Dissolved: 2013
- Ground: Municipal de Daimiel, Daimiel, Castile-La Mancha, Spain
- Capacity: 3,500
- Chairman: (Spain) Leonardo García
- Manager: (Spain) Santos García
- 2012–13: Primera Autonómica Preferente – Group 1, 4th of 18
Home colours	Away colours

Daimiel Club de Fútbol was a football team based in Daimiel in the autonomous community of Castile-La Mancha. Founded in 1942 and dissolved in 2013, it last played in the Primera Autonómica Preferente – Group 1. Its stadium is Municipal de Daimiel with a capacity of 3,500 seats.

After the club's dissolution, Daimiel Racing Club (founded in 2010) inherited its colors and badge.

== Season to season ==
Season	Tier	Division	Place	Copa del Rey
1943–44	4	1ª Reg.	6th	
1944–45	4	1ª Reg.	2nd	
1945–46	DNP			
1946–47	4	1ª Reg.	2nd	
1947–48	DNP			
1948–49	4	1ª Reg.	6th	
1949–50	4	1ª Reg.	4th	
1950–51	4	1ª Reg.		
1951–52	4	1ª Reg.		
1952–53	4	1ª Reg.	2nd	
1953–54	4	1ª Reg.	1st	
1954–55	DNP			
1955–56	4	1ª Reg.	4th	
1956–57	4	1ª Reg.	3rd	
1957–58	4	1ª Reg.	2nd	
1958–59	4	1ª Reg.	7th	
1959–60	4	1ª Reg.	3rd	
1960–61	4	1ª Reg.	8th	
1961–62	4	1ª Reg.	6th	
1962–1968	DNP			

Season	Tier	Division	Place	Copa del Rey
1968–69	6	3ª Reg.	10th	
1969–70	7	3ª Reg.	11th	
1970–71	7	3ª Reg.	6th	
1971–72	7	3ª Reg.	1st	
1972–73	5	2ª Reg.	10th	
1973–74	6	2ª Reg.	7th	
1974–75	6	2ª Reg.	2nd	
1975–76	6	2ª Reg.	1st	
1976–77	5	1ª Reg.	6th	
1977–78	5	Reg. Pref.	6th	
1978–79	5	Reg. Pref.	6th	
1979–80	5	Reg. Pref.	7th	
1980–81	4	3ª	8th	
1981–82	4	3ª	13th	
1982–83	4	3ª	8th	
1983–84	4	3ª	16th	
1984–85	4	3ª	11th	
1985–86	4	3ª	7th	
1986–87	4	3ª	11th	
1987–88	3	2ª B	20th	

Season	Tier	Division	Place	Copa del Rey
1988–89	4	3ª	8th	First round
1989–90	4	3ª	7th	
1990–91	4	3ª	10th	
1991–92	4	3ª	19th	
1992–93	5	Reg. Pref.	13th	
1993–94	5	Reg. Pref.	4th	
1994–95	4	3ª	13th	
1995–96	4	3ª	19th	
1996–97	5	1ª Aut.	15th	
1997–98	5	1ª Aut.	12th	
1998–99	5	1ª Aut.	8th	
1999–2000	5	1ª Aut.	13th	
2000–01	5	1ª Aut.	15th	

Season	Tier	Division	Place	Copa del Rey
2001–02	5	1ª Aut.	14th	
2002–03	5	1ª Aut.	3rd	
2003–04	5	1ª Aut.	2nd	
2004–05	4	3ª	12th	
2005–06	4	3ª	20th	
2006–07	5	1ª Aut.	1st	
2007–08	4	3ª	15th	
2008–09	4	3ª	9th	
2009–10	4	3ª	20th	
2010–11	5	Aut. Pref.	6th	
2011–12	5	Aut. Pref.	2nd	
2012–13	5	Aut. Pref.	4th	

- 1 seasons in Segunda División B
- 18 seasons in Tercera División
