= AD Campillo =

Association football club in Spain

Campillo
- Full name: Agrupación Deportiva Campillo
- Founded: 1973
- Ground: Virgen de La Loma, Campillo de Altobuey, Castilla–La Mancha, Spain
- Capacity: 500
- President: Héctor Luján
- Manager: Daniel Plaza
- League: Primera Autonómica Preferente – Group 1
- 2024–25: Primera Autonómica Preferente – Group 1, 11th of 18
| Home colours | Away colours |

Agrupación Deportiva Campillo is a Spanish football team located in Campillo de Altobuey, Cuenca, in the autonomous community of Castilla–La Mancha. Founded in 1973, they play in Primera Autonómica Preferente – Group 1, holding home matches at Campo Municipal Virgen de La Loma with a capacity of 500 spectators.

== Season to season ==
| Season | Tier | Division | Place | Copa del Rey |
|---|---|---|---|---|
| 1973–74 | 7 | 3ª Reg. | 1st | |
| 1974–75 | 6 | 2ª Reg. | 14th | |
| 1975–76 | 6 | 2ª Reg. | 15th | |
| 1976–77 | 6 | 2ª Reg. | 10th | |
| 1977–78 | 7 | 2ª Reg. | 3rd | |
| 1978–79 | 7 | 2ª Reg. | 15th | |
| 1979–80 | 7 | 2ª Reg. | 1st | |
| 1980–81 | 6 | 1ª Reg. | 17th | |
| 1981–82 | 6 | 1ª Reg. | 20th | |
| 1982–83 | 7 | 2ª Reg. | 1st | |
| 1983–84 | 6 | 1ª Reg. | 17th | |
| 1984–85 | 6 | 1ª Reg. | 12th | |
| 1985–86 | 6 | 1ª Reg. | 6th | |
| 1986–87 | 5 | Reg. Pref. | 7th | |
| 1987–88 | 4 | 3ª | 16th | |
| 1988–89 | 4 | 3ª | 16th | |
| 1989–90 | 4 | 3ª | 18th | |
| 1990–91 | 5 | Reg. Pref. | 1st | |
| 1991–92 | 4 | 3ª | 8th | |
| 1992–93 | 4 | 3ª | 12th | |
| 1993–94 | 4 | 3ª | 13th | |

| Season | Tier | Division | Place | Copa del Rey |
|---|---|---|---|---|
| 1994–95 | 4 | 3ª | 9th | |
| 1995–96 | 4 | 3ª | 15th | |
| 1996–97 | 4 | 3ª | 18th | |
| 1997–98 | 5 | 1ª Aut. | 6th | |
| 1998–99 | 5 | 1ª Aut. | 1st | |
| 1999–2000 | 4 | 3ª | 13th | |
| 2000–01 | 4 | 3ª | 18th | |
| 2001–02 | 5 | 1ª Aut. | (R) | |
| 2002–2012 | DNP | | | |
| 2012–13 | 7 | 2ª Aut. | 8th | |
| 2013–14 | 7 | 2ª Aut. | 3rd | |
| 2014–15 | DNP | | | |
| 2015–16 | 7 | 2ª Aut. | 3rd | |
| 2016–17 | 6 | 1ª Aut. | 9th | |
| 2017–18 | 6 | 1ª Aut. | 2nd | |
| 2018–19 | 5 | Aut. Pref. | 10th | |
| 2019–20 | 5 | Aut. Pref. | 9th | |
| 2020–21 | 5 | Aut. Pref. | 6th | |
| 2021–22 | 6 | Aut. Pref. | 6th | |
| 2022–23 | 6 | Aut. Pref. | 9th | |
| 2023–24 | 6 | Aut. Pref. | 6th | |

| Season | Tier | Division | Place | Copa del Rey |
|---|---|---|---|---|
| 2024–25 | 6 | Aut. Pref. | 11th | |
| 2025–26 | 6 | Aut. Pref. | | |

- 3 seasons in Tercera Federación
