= CD Sonseca =

Spanish football club

Sonseca
- Full name: Club Deportivo Sonseca
- Founded: 1959
- Stadium: Martín Juanes, Sonseca, Castilla-La Mancha, Spain
- Capacity: 2,000
- President: Miguel Ángel Martín-Hervás
- Manager: David López
- League: Primera Autonómica Preferente – Group 2
- 2025–26: Tercera Federación – Group 18, 17th of 18 (relegated)
Home colours	Away colours

Club Deportivo Sonseca is a Spanish football club based in Sonseca in the autonomous community of Castilla-La Mancha. Founded in 1959, it plays in Primera Autonómica Preferente – Group 2, holding home games at Estadio Municipal Martín Juanes, with a capacity of 2,000 people.

== History ==
Founded in 1959, Sonseca played in regional leagues until 1987, when the club achieved a first-ever promotion to Tercera División. Relegated after a two-season spell, they only returned to a national competition in June 2024, after qualifying to the preliminary rounds of the 2024–25 Copa del Rey.

On 31 May 2025, Sonseca achieved promotion to Tercera Federación after defeating La Roda CF in the promotion play-offs.

== Season to season ==
Season	Tier	Division	Place	Copa del Rey
1960–61	6	3ª Reg.	4th	
1961–62	6	3ª Reg.	2nd	
1962–63	DNP			
1963–64	DNP			
1964–65	5	2ª Reg.	9th	
1965–66	5	2ª Reg.	3rd	
1966–67	5	2ª Reg.	9th	
1967–68	5	2ª Reg.	5th	
1968–69	5	2ª Reg.	2nd	
1969–70	5	2ª Reg.	8th	
1970–71	5	2ª Reg.	7th	
1971–72	5	2ª Reg.	8th	
1972–73	5	2ª Reg.	13th	
1973–74	6	2ª Reg.	1st	
1974–75	5	1ª Reg.	14th	
1975–76	5	1ª Reg.	6th	
1976–77	4	Reg. Pref.	10th	
1977–78	5	Reg. Pref.	7th	
1978–79	5	Reg. Pref.	17th	
1979–80	6	1ª Reg.	4th	

Season	Tier	Division	Place	Copa del Rey
1980–81	5	Reg. Pref.	18th	
1981–82	6	1ª Reg.	6th	
1982–83	6	1ª Reg.	7th	
1983–84	6	1ª Reg.	1st	
1984–85	5	Reg. Pref.	7th	
1985–86	5	Reg. Pref.	7th	
1986–87	5	Reg. Pref.	4th	
1987–88	4	3ª	11th	
1988–89	4	3ª	20th	
1989–90	5	Reg. Pref.	5th	
1990–91	5	Reg. Pref.	15th	
1991–92	6	1ª Reg.	9th	
1992–93	6	2ª Reg.	3rd	
1993–94	6	1ª Reg.	4th	
1994–95	5	Reg. Pref.	10th	
1995–96	5	1ª Aut.	8th	
1996–97	5	1ª Aut.	4th	
1997–98	5	1ª Aut.	14th	
1998–99	5	1ª Aut.	8th	
1999–2000	5	1ª Aut.	10th	

Season	Tier	Division	Place	Copa del Rey
2000–01	5	1ª Aut.	9th	
2001–02	5	1ª Aut.	15th	
2002–03	5	1ª Aut.	4th	
2003–04	5	1ª Aut.	11th	
2004–05	5	1ª Aut.	7th	
2005–06	5	1ª Aut.	12th	
2006–07	5	1ª Aut.	11th	
2007–08	5	Aut. Pref.	7th	
2008–09	5	Aut. Pref.	16th	
2009–10	6	1ª Aut.	1st	
2010–11	5	Aut. Pref.	15th	
2011–12	6	1ª Aut.	2nd	
2012–13	5	Aut. Pref.	5th	
2013–14	5	Aut. Pref.	10th	
2014–15	5	Aut. Pref.	10th	
2015–16	5	Aut. Pref.	8th	
2016–17	5	Aut. Pref.	4th	
2017–18	5	Aut. Pref.	9th	
2018–19	5	Aut. Pref.	5th	
2019–20	5	Aut. Pref.	8th	

Season	Tier	Division	Place	Copa del Rey
2020–21	5	Aut. Pref.	10th	
2021–22	7	1ª Aut.	2nd	
2022–23	7	1ª Aut.	2nd	
2023–24	6	Aut. Pref.	3rd	
2024–25	6	Aut. Pref.	2nd	Preliminary
2025–26	5	3ª Fed.		

- 2 seasons in Tercera División
- 1 season in Tercera Federación
