= Daimiel Racing Club =

Spanish football club

Daimiel
- Full name: Daimiel Racing Club de Fútbol
- Founded: 2010
- Ground: Municipal, Daimiel, Castile-La Mancha, Spain
- Capacity: 3,500
- President: Óscar Pinilla
- Manager: Tato Giménez
- League: Primera Autonómica Preferente – Group 1
- 2024–25: Primera Autonómica – Group 2, 3rd of 16 (promoted)
Home colours	Away colours

Daimiel Racing Club de Fútbol is a football team based in Daimiel, in the autonomous community of Castile-La Mancha. Founded in 2010, they play in Primera Autonómica Preferente – Group 1, holding home matches at the Estadio Municipal de Daimiel with a capacity of 3,500 people.

== Honours ==
Founded in 2010 as Daimiel Racing Club, the club achieved two promotions in their first three seasons. In 2013, after Daimiel CF was dissolved, Racing (predominantly green) inherited its colors and logo, and changed name to Daimiel Racing Club de Fútbol.

In May 2014, Daimiel RCF achieved promotion to Tercera División.

== Season to season ==
Season	Tier	Division	Place	Copa del Rey
2010–11	7	2ª Aut.	4th	
2011–12	7	2ª Aut.	4th	
2012–13	6	1ª Aut.	3rd	
2013–14	5	Aut. Pref.	2nd	
2014–15	4	3ª	18th	
2015–16	5	Aut. Pref.	8th	
2016–17	5	Aut. Pref.	14th	
2017–18	5	Aut. Pref.	11th	
2018–19	5	Aut. Pref.	9th	
2019–20	5	Aut. Pref.	17th	
2020–21	5	Aut. Pref.	12th	
2021–22	7	1ª Aut.	5th	
2022–23	7	1ª Aut.	4th	
2023–24	7	1ª Aut.	3rd	
2024–25	7	1ª Aut.	3rd	
2025–26	6	Aut. Pref.		

- 1 season in Tercera División
