= CD Huracán de Balazote =

Spanish football club

Huracán Balazote
- Full name: Club Deportivo Huracán de Balazote
- Founded: 2007
- Ground: Municipal, Balazote, Castilla–La Mancha, Spain
- Capacity: 500
- Chairman: Matteo Simarro
- Manager: Augusto Teruel
- League: Tercera Federación – Group 18
- 2025–26: Tercera Federación – Group 18, 11th of 18
Home colours	Away colours

Club Deportivo Huracán de Balazote is a Spanish football team located in Balazote, Albacete, in the autonomous community of Castilla–La Mancha. Founded in 2007, they play in Tercera Federación – Group 18, holding home matches at Campo de Fútbol Municipal de Balazote with a capacity of 500 spectators.

== Season to season ==
Season	Tier	Division	Place	Copa del Rey
2007–08	7	2ª Aut.	10th	
2008–09	7	2ª Aut.	7th	
2009–10	7	2ª Aut.	1st	
2010–11	6	1ª Aut.	5th	
2011–12	6	1ª Aut.	4th	
2012–13	6	1ª Aut.	10th	
2013–14	6	1ª Aut.	4th	
2014–15	6	1ª Aut.	2nd	
2015–16	5	Aut. Pref.	14th	
2016–17	5	Aut. Pref.	5th	
2017–18	5	Aut. Pref.	5th	
2018–19	5	Aut. Pref.	3rd	
2019–20	5	Aut. Pref.	2nd	
2020–21	4	3ª	6th / 5th	
2021–22	5	3ª RFEF	14th	
2022–23	6	Aut. Pref.	2nd	
2023–24	5	3ª Fed.	14th	
2024–25	5	3ª Fed.	6th	
2025–26	5	3ª Fed.	11th	
2026–27	5	3ª Fed.		

- 1 season in Tercera División
- 5 seasons in Tercera Federación/Tercera División RFEF
