= CD Torrijos =

Association football club in Spain

Torrijos
- Full name: Club Deportivo Torrijos
- Founded: 1954; 72 years ago
- Ground: San Francisco, Torrijos, Castile-La Mancha, Spain
- Capacity: 2,500
- Chairman: (Spain) Francisco Javier Martín
- Manager: (Spain) José Ramón Corchado
- League: Tercera Federación – Group 18
- 2025–26: Primera Autonómica Preferente – Group 2, 2nd of 18 (promoted via play-offs)
Home colours	Away colours

Club Deportivo Torrijos is a Spanish football team based in Torrijos, in the autonomous community of Castile-La Mancha. Founded in 1954, it plays in Tercera Federación – Group 18, holding home games at Estadio San Francisco, with a capacity of 2,500 seats.

== Season to season ==
Season	Tier	Division	Place	Copa del Rey
1954–55	6	3ª Reg.	7th	
1955–56	6	3ª Reg.	5th	
1956–57	6	3ª Reg.	5th	
1957–58	6	3ª Reg.	6th	
1958–59	6	3ª Reg.	8th	
1959–60	6	3ª Reg.	2nd	
1960–61	5	2ª Reg.	1st	
1961–62	4	1ª Reg.	3rd	
1962–63	4	1ª Reg.	5th	
1963–64	3	3ª	15th	
1964–65	4	1ª Reg.	3rd	
1965–66	3	3ª	15th	
1966–67	3	3ª	17th	
1967–68	4	1ª Reg.	11th	
1968–69	5	2ª Reg.	6th	
1969–70	5	2ª Reg.	14th	
1970–71	5	2ª Reg.	13th	
1971–72	5	2ª Reg.	10th	
1972–73	5	2ª Reg.	17th	
1973–74	6	2ª Reg.	13th	

Season	Tier	Division	Place	Copa del Rey
1974–75	6	2ª Reg.	8th	
1975–76	6	2ª Reg.	1st	
1976–77	5	1ª Reg.	13th	
1977–78	6	1ª Reg.	3rd	
1978–79	6	1ª Reg.	3rd	
1979–80	5	Reg. Pref.	14th	
1980–81	5	Reg. Pref.	9th	
1981–82	5	Reg. Pref.	11th	
1982–83	5	Reg. Pref.	18th	
1983–84	5	Reg. Pref.	13th	
1984–85	5	Reg. Pref.	8th	
1985–86	5	Reg. Pref.	13th	
1986–87	5	Reg. Pref.	19th	
1987–88	5	Reg. Pref.	8th	
1988–89	5	Reg. Pref.	10th	
1989–90	5	Reg. Pref.	4th	
1990–91	5	Reg. Pref.	8th	
1991–92	5	Reg. Pref.	2nd	
1992–93	4	3ª	7th	
1993–94	4	3ª	9th	

Season	Tier	Division	Place	Copa del Rey
1994–95	4	3ª	4th	
1995–96	4	3ª	11th	
1996–97	4	3ª	2nd	
1997–98	4	3ª	7th	
1998–99	4	3ª	12th	
1999–2000	4	3ª	14th	
2000–01	4	3ª	14th	
2001–02	4	3ª	9th	
2002–03	4	3ª	16th	
2003–04	4	3ª	16th	
2004–05	4	3ª	18th	
2005–06	5	1ª Aut.	5th	
2006–07	5	1ª Aut.	1st	
2007–08	4	3ª	18th	
2008–09	5	Aut. Pref.	2nd	
2009–10	4	3ª	7th	
2010–11	4	3ª	15th	
2011–12	4	3ª	11th	
2012–13	4	3ª	19th	
2013–14	5	Aut. Pref.	5th	

Season	Tier	Division	Place	Copa del Rey
2014–15	5	Aut. Pref.	3rd	
2015–16	5	Aut. Pref.	9th	
2016–17	5	Aut. Pref.	15th	
2017-18	6	1ª Aut.	1st	
2018–19	5	Aut. Pref.	2nd	
2019–20	4	3ª	11th	
2020–21	4	3ª	3rd / 6th	
2021–22	5	3ª RFEF	5th	
2022–23	5	3ª Fed.	9th	
2023–24	5	3ª Fed.	16th	
2024–25	6	Aut. Pref.	10th	
2025–26	6	Aut. Pref.	2nd	
2026–27	5	3ª Fed.		

- 23 seasons in Tercera División
- 4 seasons in Tercera Federación/Tercera División RFEF
