= CD Miguelturreño =

Spanish football team

Miguelturreño
- Full name: Club Deportivo Miguelturreño
- Founded: 1975
- Ground: Estadio Municipal, Miguelturra, Castilla-La Mancha, Spain
- Capacity: 1,000
- Chairman: (Spain) Santos Fernández
- Manager: (Spain) José Vicente Rojas
- League: Primera Autonómica – Group 2
- 2024–25: Primera Autonómica Preferente – Group 1, 15th of 18 (relegated)
Home colours	Away colours

Club Deportivo Miguelturreño is a football team based in Miguelturra in the autonomous community of Castile-La Mancha. Founded in 1975, it plays in the Primera Autonómica – Group 2. Its home ground is Estadio Municipal with a capacity of 1,000 seats.

== Season to season ==
Season	Tier	Division	Place	Copa del Rey
1975–76	7	3ª Reg. P.	2nd	
1976–77	6	2ª Reg.	12th	
1977–78	7	2ª Reg.	5th	
1978–79	7	2ª Reg.	5th	
1979–80	7	2ª Reg.	3rd	
1980–81	6	1ª Reg.	5th	
1981–82	6	1ª Reg.	2nd	
1982–83	5	Reg. Pref.	10th	
1983–84	5	Reg. Pref.	10th	
1984–85	5	Reg. Pref.	13th	
1985–86	5	Reg. Pref.	14th	
1986–87	5	Reg. Pref.	12th	
1987–88	5	Reg. Pref.	11th	
1988–89	5	Reg. Pref.	8th	
1989–90	5	Reg. Pref.	14th	
1990–91	5	Reg. Pref.	12th	
1991–92	5	Reg. Pref.	16th	
1992–93	6	1ª Reg.	12th	
1993–94	6	1ª Reg.	1st	
1994–95	5	Reg. Pref.	13th	

Season	Tier	Division	Place	Copa del Rey
1995–96	5	1ª Aut.	12th	
1996–97	5	1ª Aut.	8th	
1997–98	5	1ª Aut.	7th	
1998–99	5	1ª Aut.	9th	
1999–2000	5	1ª Aut.	4th	
2000–01	5	1ª Aut.	2nd	
2001–02	5	1ª Aut.	12th	
2002–03	5	1ª Aut.	6th	
2003–04	5	1ª Aut.	13th	
2004–05	5	1ª Aut.	8th	
2005–06	5	1ª Aut.	2nd	
2006–07	4	3ª	15th	
2007–08	4	3ª	19th	
2008–09	5	Aut. Pref.	4th	
2009–10	5	Aut. Pref.	5th	
2010–11	5	Aut. Pref.	13th	
2011–12	5	Aut. Pref.	14th	
2012–13	5	Aut. Pref.	13th	
2013–14	5	Aut. Pref.	12th	
2014–15	5	Aut. Pref.	10th	

Season	Tier	Division	Place	Copa del Rey
2015–16	5	Aut. Pref.	7th	
2016–17	5	Aut. Pref.	2nd	
2017–18	4	3ª	20th	
2018–19	5	Aut. Pref.	6th	
2019–20	5	Aut. Pref.	6th	
2020–21	5	Aut. Pref.	1st	
2021–22	5	3ª RFEF	16th	
2022–23	6	Aut. Pref.	14th	
2023–24	6	Aut. Pref.	14th	
2024–25	6	Aut. Pref.	15th	
2025–26	7	1ª Aut.		

- 3 seasons in Tercera División
- 1 season in Tercera División RFEF
