= Atlético Tarazona =

- Full name: Atlético Tarazona
- Founded: 1972; 54 years ago (as CP Doncel); 2013; 13 years ago (refounded); 2021; 5 years ago (refounded)
- Ground: Faustino Alvarruiz, Tarazona de la Mancha, Castile-La Mancha, Spain
- Capacity: 3,000
- President: Faustino Oltra 'Foti'
- Manager: Fran Bueno
- League: Primera Autonómica – Group 1
- 2024–25: Primera Autonómica – Group 1, 7th of 16
Home colours	Away colours

Atlético Tarazona is a Spanish football team based in Tarazona de la Mancha, Albacete, in the autonomous community of Castile-La Mancha. Founded in 1972 as Club Polideportivo Doncel, they play in Primera Autonómica – Group 1, holding home matches at the Estadio Faustino Alvarruiz, with a capacity of 3,000 seats.

The club was disbanded after the 2010–11 season due to financial difficulties, returning in 2013 and remaining active until 2020. In 2021, after one year of inactivity, they returned to play.

== Season to season ==
Season	Tier	Division	Place	Copa del Rey
1972–73	6	2ª Reg.	2nd	
1973–74	6	2ª Reg.	10th	
1974–75	6	2ª Reg.	1st	
1977–78	5	1ª Reg.	19th	
1976–77	6	2ª Reg.	1st	
1977–78	6	1ª Reg.	15th	
1978–79	6	1ª Reg.	19th	
1979–80	7	2ª Reg.	3rd	
1980–81	6	1ª Reg.	9th	
1981–82	6	1ª Reg.	13th	
1982–83	6	1ª Reg.	2nd	
1983–84	6	1ª Reg.	3rd	
1984–85	6	1ª Reg.	3rd	
1985–86	6	1ª Reg.	7th	
1986–87	5	Reg. Pref.	16th	
1987–88	5	Reg. Pref.	5th	
1988–89	5	Reg. Pref.	7th	
1989–90	5	Reg. Pref.	15th	
1990–91	6	1ª Reg.	5th	
1991–92	6	1ª Reg.	7th	

Season	Tier	Division	Place	Copa del Rey
1992–93	6	1ª Reg.	11th	
1993–94	6	1ª Reg.	14th	
1994–95	7	2ª Reg.	5th	
1995–96	6	2ª Aut.	1st	
1996–97	5	1ª Aut.	9th	
1997–98	5	1ª Aut.	5th	
1998–99	5	1ª Aut.	11th	
1999–2000	5	1ª Aut.	6th	
2000–01	5	1ª Aut.	9th	
2001–02	5	1ª Aut.	2nd	
2002–03	4	3ª	18th	
2003–04	5	1ª Aut.	1st	
2004–05	4	3ª	16th	
2005–06	4	3ª	13th	
2006–07	4	3ª	10th	
2007–08	4	3ª	14th	
2008–09	4	3ª	19th	
2009–10	5	Aut. Pref.	17th	
2010–11	6	1ª Aut.	16th	
2011–12	DNP			

Season	Tier	Division	Place	Copa del Rey
2012–13	DNP			
2013–14	7	2ª Aut.	4th	
2014–15	6	1ª Aut.	6th	
2015–16	6	1ª Aut.	3rd	
2016–17	6	1ª Aut.	5th	
2017–18	6	1ª Aut.	3rd	
2018–19	6	1ª Aut.	2nd	
2019–20	5	Aut. Pref.	18th	
2020–21	DNP			
2021–22	8	2ª Aut.	1st	
2022–23	7	1ª Aut.	10th	
2023–24	7	1ª Aut.	5th	
2024–25	7	1ª Aut.	7th	
2025–26	7	1ª Aut.		

- 6 seasons in Tercera División

== Famous players ==
- (Spain) Javier Oliete
