= CD Pedroñeras =

Association football club in Spain

Pedroñeras
- Full name: Club Deportivo Pedroñeras
- Founded: 1964
- Ground: Municipal de Las Pedroñeras, Castilla-La Mancha, Spain
- Capacity: 1,000
- President: Board of directors
- Head coach: Javier Bermúdez
- League: Tercera Federación – Group 18
- 2024–25: Tercera Federación – Group 18, 12th of 18
- Website: https://www.pedroneras.com/cdpedroneras/
Home colours

Club Deportivo Pedroñeras is a Spanish football club located in Las Pedroñeras, Cuenca, in the autonomous community of Castilla–La Mancha. Founded in 1964 it currently plays in Tercera Federación – Group 18, holding home matches at Municipal de Las Pedroñeras with a capacity of 1,000 spectators.

== History ==
The club was founded in 1964. In 2019 it won the Preferente La Mancha and promoted to the Tercera División.

== Season to season ==
Season	Tier	Division	Place	Copa del Rey
1964–65	6	3ª Reg.	3rd	
1965–66	6	3ª Reg.	5th	
1966–67	6	3ª Reg.	5th	
1967–68	6	3ª Reg.	3rd	
1968–69	6	3ª Reg.	7th	
1969–1975	DNP			
1975–76	7	3ª Reg. P.	4th	
1976–77	7	3ª Reg. P.	2nd	
1977–78	7	2ª Reg.	16th	
1978–79	8	3ª Reg. P.	3rd	
1979–80	8	3ª Reg. P.	1st	
1980–81	7	2ª Reg.	2nd	
1981–82	6	1ª Reg.	11th	
1982–83	6	1ª Reg.	2nd	
1983–84	5	Reg. Pref.	12th	
1984–85	5	Reg. Pref.	10th	
1985–86	5	Reg. Pref.	8th	
1986–87	5	Reg. Pref.	15th	
1987–88	5	Reg. Pref.	18th	
1988–89	5	Reg. Pref.	10th	

Season	Tier	Division	Place	Copa del Rey
1989–90	5	Reg. Pref.	9th	
1990–91	5	Reg. Pref.	17th	
1991–92	6	1ª Reg.	4th	
1992–93	6	1ª Reg.	8th	
1993–94	6	1ª Reg.	4th	
1994–95	5	Reg. Pref.	4th	
1995–96	5	1ª Aut.	5th	
1996–97	5	1ª Aut.	10th	
1997–98	5	1ª Aut.	14th	
1998–99	5	1ª Aut.	10th	
1999–2000	5	1ª Aut.	16th	
2000–01	5	1ª Aut.	6th	
2001–02	5	1ª Aut.	5th	
2002–03	5	1ª Aut.	11th	
2003–04	5	1ª Aut.	12th	
2004–05	5	1ª Aut.	7th	
2005–06	5	1ª Aut.	14th	
2006–07	5	1ª Aut.	20th	
2007–08	7	2ª Aut.	1st	
2008–09	6	1ª Aut.	5th	

Season	Tier	Division	Place	Copa del Rey
2009–10	5	Aut. Pref.	18th	
2010–11	6	1ª Aut.	3rd	
2011–12	5	Aut. Pref.	5th	
2012–13	5	Aut. Pref.	2nd	
2013–14	4	3ª	7th	
2014–15	4	3ª	11th	
2015–16	4	3ª	13th	
2016–17	4	3ª	16th	
2017–18	4	3ª	18th	
2018–19	5	Aut. Pref.	1st	
2019–20	4	3ª	18th	Preliminary
2020–21	4	3ª	11th / 6th	
2021–22	6	Aut. Pref.	4th	
2022–23	6	Aut. Pref.	5th	
2023–24	6	Aut. Pref.	1st	
2024–25	5	3ª Fed.	12th	
2025–26	5	3ª Fed.		

- 7 seasons in Tercera División
- 2 seasons in Tercera Federación
