= CD Unión Criptanense =

Spanish football team

Criptanense
- Full name: Club Deportivo Unión Criptanense Tierra de Gigantes
- Founded: 1925
- Ground: Agustín de la Fuente, Campo de Criptana, Castile-La Mancha, Spain
- Capacity: 2,500
- Chairman: (Spain) Juan José Sánchez
- Manager: (Spain) León Pintado
- League: Primera Autonómica – Group 2
- 2024–25: Primera Autonómica – Group 2, 8th of 16
Home colours	Away colours

Club Deportivo Unión Criptanense Tierra de Gigantes is a Spanish football team based in Campo de Criptana, Ciudad Real, in the autonomous community of Castile-La Mancha. Founded in 1925, they play in Primera Autonómica – Group 2, holding home matches at Estadio Agustín de la Fuente, with a capacity of 2,500 seats.

== Season to season ==
Season	Tier	Division	Place	Copa del Rey
1949–50	4	1ª Reg.	3rd	
1950–51	DNP			
1951–52	DNP			
1952–53	4	1ª Reg.	7th	
1953–54	4	1ª Reg.	9th	
1954–55	4	1ª Reg.	3rd	
1955–56	4	1ª Reg.		
1956–57	4	1ª Reg.	7th	
1957–58	4	1ª Reg.	8th	
1958–59	DNP			
1959–60	4	1ª Reg.	7th	
1960–61	4	1ª Reg.	6th	
1961–62	DNP			
1962–63	4	1ª Reg.	6th	
1963–1967	DNP			
1967–68	6	3ª Reg. P.	4th	
1968–69	6	3ª Reg. P.	6th	
1969–70	7	3ª Reg.	6th	
1970–71	7	3ª Reg.	1st	
1971–72	5	2ª Reg.	9th	

Season	Tier	Division	Place	Copa del Rey
1972–73	5	2ª Reg.	12th	
1973–74	6	2ª Reg.	8th	
1974–75	6	2ª Reg.	11th	
1975–76	6	2ª Reg.	4th	
1976–77	6	2ª Reg.	15th	
1977–78	7	2ª Reg.	1st	
1978–79	6	1ª Reg.	7th	
1979–80	6	1ª Reg.	3rd	
1980–81	5	Reg. Pref.	12th	
1981–82	5	Reg. Pref.	18th	
1982–83	6	1ª Reg.	10th	
1983–84	6	1ª Reg.	10th	
1984–85	6	1ª Reg.	5th	
1985–86	6	1ª Reg.	4th	
1986–87	5	Reg. Pref.	6th	
1987–88	5	Reg. Pref.	2nd	
1988–89	4	3ª	22nd	
1989–90	5	Reg. Pref.	14th	
1990–91	5	Reg. Pref.	10th	
1991–92	5	Reg. Pref.	8th	

Season	Tier	Division	Place	Copa del Rey
1992–93	5	Reg. Pref.	9th	
1993–94	5	Reg. Pref.	13th	
1994–95	5	Reg. Pref.	7th	
1995–96	5	1ª Aut.	8th	
1996–97	5	1ª Aut.	5th	
1997–98	5	1ª Aut.	8th	
1998–99	5	1ª Aut.	5th	
1999–2000	5	1ª Aut.	9th	
2000–01	5	1ª Aut.	14th	
2001–02	5	1ª Aut.	15th	
2002–03	5	1ª Aut.	17th	
2003–04	6	2ª Aut.	2nd	
2004–05	6	2ª Aut.	1st	
2005–06	5	1ª Aut.	7th	
2006–07	5	1ª Aut.	2nd	
2007–08	4	3ª	13th	
2008–09	4	3ª	12th	
2009–10	4	3ª	8th	
2010–11	4	3ª	20th	
2011–12	5	Aut. Pref.	16th	

Season	Tier	Division	Place	Copa del Rey
2012–13	6	1ª Aut.	1st	
2013–14	5	Aut. Pref.	17th	
2014–15	6	1ª Aut.	9th	
2015–16	6	1ª Aut.	4th	
2016–17	6	1ª Aut.	4th	
2017–18	6	1ª Aut.	4th	
2018–19	6	1ª Aut.	1st	
2019–20	5	Aut. Pref.	11th	
2020–21	5	Aut. Pref.	2nd	
2021–22	6	Aut. Pref.	8th	
2022–23	6	Aut. Pref.	17th	
2023–24	7	1ª Aut.	13th	
2024–25	7	1ª Aut.	8th	
2025–26	7	1ª Aut.		

- 5 seasons in Tercera División
