= AD San Clemente =

Spanish football club

San Clemente
- Full name: Agrupación Deportiva San Clemente
- Nickname: Agrupa
- Founded: 1974
- Ground: Municipal, San Clemente, Castilla-La Mancha, Spain
- Capacity: 1,500
- President: Agustín Rubio
- Manager: Jesús Tobarra
- League: Tercera Federación – Group 18
- 2025–26: Tercera Federación – Group 18, 8th of 18
- Website: https://www.adsanclemente.es/
Home colours	Away colours

Agrupación Deportiva San Clemente is a Spanish football club located in San Clemente, Cuenca, in the autonomous community of Castilla–La Mancha. Founded in 1974, they play in Tercera Federación – Group 18, holding home matches at Estadio Municipal de San Clemente, with a capacity of 1,500 spectators.

== Season to season ==
Season	Tier	Division	Place	Copa del Rey
1975–76	7	3ª Reg. P.	6th	
1976–77	7	3ª Reg. P.	1st	
1977–78	7	2ª Reg.	11th	
1978–79	7	2ª Reg.	14th	
1979–80	7	2ª Reg.	11th	
1980–81	7	2ª Reg.	10th	
1981–82	7	2ª Reg.	12th	
1982–83	7	2ª Reg.	5th	
1983–84	7	2ª Reg.	18th	
1984–85	8	3ª Reg. P.	14th	
1985–86	8	3ª Reg. P.	6th	
1986–87	6	1ª Reg.	3rd	
1987–88	6	1ª Reg.	14th	
1988–89	6	1ª Reg.	5th	
1989–90	6	1ª Reg.	4th	
1990–91	6	1ª Reg.	13th	
1991–92	6	1ª Reg.	14th	
1992–93	7	2ª Reg.	3rd	
1993–94	6	1ª Reg.	12th	
1994–95	5	Reg. Pref.	6th	

Season	Tier	Division	Place	Copa del Rey
1995–96	5	1ª Aut.	10th	
1996–97	5	1ª Aut.	7th	
1997–98	5	1ª Aut.	3rd	
1998–99	5	1ª Aut.	3rd	
1999–2000	5	1ª Aut.	17th	
2000–01	6	2ª Aut.	10th	
2001–02	6	2ª Aut.	8th	
2002–2007	DNP			
2007–08	7	2ª Aut.	9th	
2008–09	7	2ª Aut.	2nd	
2009–10	6	1ª Aut.	7th	
2010–11	6	1ª Aut.	6th	
2011–12	6	1ª Aut.	15th	
2012–13	7	2ª Aut.	4th	
2013–14	6	1ª Aut.	7th	
2014–15	6	1ª Aut.	7th	
2015–16	6	1ª Aut.	9th	
2016–17	6	1ª Aut.	2nd	
2017–18	5	Aut. Pref.	7th	
2018–19	5	Aut. Pref.	7th	

Season	Tier	Division	Place	Copa del Rey
2019–20	5	Aut. Pref.	3rd	
2020–21	5	Aut. Pref.	1st	
2021–22	5	3ª RFEF	15th	
2022–23	6	Aut. Pref.	3rd	
2023–24	5	3ª Fed.	18th	
2024–25	6	Aut. Pref.	1st	
2025–26	5	3ª Fed.	8th	
2026–27	5	3ª Fed.		

- 4 seasons in Tercera Federación/Tercera División RFEF
