= Almagro CF =

Association football club in Spain

- Full name: Almagro Club de Fútbol
- Nickname: Los encajeros
- Founded: 1957
- Dissolved: 2022
- Ground: Manuel Trujillo, Almagro, Castile-La Mancha, Spain
- Capacity: 2,000
- Manager: Tato Giménez
- 2021–22: Primera Autonómica Preferente – Group 1, 18th of 18
Home colours	Away colours

Almagro Club de Fútbol was a Spanish football club based in Almagro, in the autonomous community of Castile-La Mancha. Founded in 1957 and dissolved in 2021, they last played in Primera Autonómica Preferente – Group 1, and held home games at Estadio Manuel Trujillo, with a 2,000-seat capacity.

== Season to season ==
Season	Tier	Division	Place	Copa del Rey
1964–65	4	1ª Reg.	4th	
1965–66	4	1ª Reg.	4th	
1966–67	4	1ª Reg.	10th	
1967–68	4	1ª Reg.	5th	
1968–69	4	1ª Reg.	5th	
1969–70	4	1ª Reg.	11th	
1970–71	4	1ª Reg.	17th	
1971–72	5	2ª Reg.	(R)	
1972–1976	DNP			
1976–77	7	3ª Reg. P.	1st	
1977–78	7	2ª Reg.	3rd	
1978–79	7	2ª Reg.	1st	
1979–80	6	1ª Reg.	11th	
1980–81	6	1ª Reg.	2nd	
1981–82	5	Reg. Pref.	10th	
1982–83	5	Reg. Pref.	12th	
1983–84	5	Reg. Pref.	2nd	
1984–85	5	Reg. Pref.	3rd	
1985–86	5	Reg. Pref.	7th	
1986–87	5	Reg. Pref.	9th	

Season	Tier	Division	Place	Copa del Rey
1987–88	5	Reg. Pref.	5th	
1988–89	5	Reg. Pref.	6th	
1989–90	5	Reg. Pref.	2nd	
1990–91	4	3ª	18th	
1991–92	5	Reg. Pref.	6th	
1992–93	5	Reg. Pref.	1st	
1993–94	4	3ª	5th	
1994–95	4	3ª	16th	
1995–96	4	3ª	16th	
1996–97	4	3ª	10th	
1997–98	4	3ª	18th	
1998–99	5	1ª Aut.	12th	
1999–2000	5	1ª Aut.	11th	
2000–01	5	1ª Aut.	17th	
2001–02	6	2ª Aut.	4th	
2002–03	6	2ª Aut.	1st	
2003–04	5	1ª Aut.	8th	
2004–05	5	1ª Aut.	11th	
2005–06	5	1ª Aut.	4th	
2006–07	5	1ª Aut.	14th	

Season	Tier	Division	Place	Copa del Rey
2007–08	5	Aut. Pref.	12th	
2008–09	5	Aut. Pref.	9th	
2009–10	5	Aut. Pref.	9th	
2010–11	5	Aut. Pref.	8th	
2011–12	5	Aut. Pref.	3rd	
2012–13	5	Aut. Pref.	6th	
2013–14	5	Aut. Pref.	1st	
2014–15	4	3ª	16th	

Season	Tier	Division	Place	Copa del Rey
2015–16	4	3ª	2nd	
2016–17	4	3ª	12th	
2017–18	4	3ª	17th	
2018–19	4	3ª	16th	
2019–20	4	3ª	16th	
2020–21	4	3ª	11th / 8th	
2021–22	6	Aut. Pref.	18th	

12 seasons in Tercera División
