= CD Tarancón =

Association football club in Spain

Tarancón
- Full name: Club Deportivo Tarancón
- Founded: 1995
- Ground: Estadio Municipal Tarancón
- Capacity: 1,500
- President: Juan José Sánchez
- Head coach: Jorge Cañete
- League: Tercera Federación – Group 18
- 2025–26: Tercera Federación – Group 18, 2nd of 18
Home colours	Away colours

Club Deportivo Tarancón is a Spanish football team located in Tarancón, Cuenca, in the autonomous community of Castilla–La Mancha. Founded in 1995 it currently plays in Tercera Federación – Group 18, holding home matches at Estadio Municipal Tarancón with a capacity of 1,500 spectators.

== History ==
Tarancón was founded in 1995, as a replacement to dissolved AD Tarancón which folded in the previous year. The city also had a CD Tarancón which played in the regional leagues in the 1950s, prior to the foundation of AD Tarancón.

The club achieved a first-ever promotion to the Tercera División in 2018.

== Season to season ==
Season	Tier	Division	Place	Copa del Rey
1995–96	6	2ª Aut.	3rd	
1996–97	6	2ª Aut.	3rd	
1997–98	6	2ª Aut.	1st	
1998–99	5	1ª Aut.	15th	
1999–2000	5	1ª Aut.	6th	
2000–01	5	1ª Aut.	3rd	
2001–02	5	1ª Aut.	5th	
2002–03	5	1ª Aut.	19th	
2003–04	6	2ª Aut.	2nd	
2004–05	6	2ª Aut.	1st	
2005–06	5	1ª Aut.	15th	
2006–07	5	1ª Aut.	19th	
2007–08	7	2ª Aut.	2nd	
2008–09	6	1ª Aut.	4th	
2009–10	5	Aut. Pref.	14th	
2010–11	6	1ª Aut.	8th	
2011–12	6	1ª Aut.	3rd	
2012–13	6	1ª Aut.	2nd	
2013–14	5	Aut. Pref.	13th	
2014–15	5	Aut. Pref.	13th	

Season	Tier	Division	Place	Copa del Rey
2015–16	5	Aut. Pref.	6th	
2016–17	5	Aut. Pref.	5th	
2017–18	5	Aut. Pref.	1st	
2018–19	4	3ª	14th	
2019–20	4	3ª	8th	
2020–21	4	3ª	6th / 2nd	
2021–22	5	3ª RFEF	10th	
2022–23	5	3ª Fed.	11th	
2023–24	5	3ª Fed.	8th	
2024–25	5	3ª Fed.	7th	
2025–26	5	3ª Fed.	2nd	
2026–27	5	3ª Fed.		TBD

- 3 seasons in Tercera División
- 6 seasons in Tercera Federación/Tercera División RFEF

== Notable players ==
- Soumaïla Konaré
- Álvaro Corral
