= CD Quintanar =

Spanish football club

Quintanar
- Full name: Club Deportivo Quintanar
- Founded: 1961; 65 years ago 1998; 28 years ago (refounded)
- Ground: Alfonso Viller García, Quintanar de la Orden, Province of Toledo, Castilla-La Mancha, Spain
- Capacity: 2,000
- Chairman: David Pérez de la Rica
- Coach: José María Arcas
- League: Primera Autonómica Preferente – Group 2
- 2024–25: Primera Autonómica Preferente – Group 2, 9th of 18
Home colours	Away colours

Club Deportivo Quintanar is a spanish football team based in Quintanar de la Orden in the autonomous community of Castilla-La Mancha. Founded in 1961, they play in Primera Autonómica Preferente – Group 2, holding home matches in the Alfonso Viller García (formerly Los Molinos), with a capacity of 2,000 seats.

== History ==
CD Quintanar was founded on 17 October 1961 but, after four seasons in Tercera División (1966–70), dissolved in 1976. In 1977 was revived as Sporting Quintanar, got promoted to Tercera División for five seasons (1987–92) and disappeared in 1993. They played as Quintanar CF between 1995 and 1998. The current club was founded in 1998 as Atlético Quintanar-Santa Gema, their name was changed to CD Quintanar in 2000 and played in Tercera División for one season (2005–06).

In 2023, for the first time in their history, the team qualified for the Copa del Rey. In the first round, on 1 November 2023, they were defeated 0-3 by Sevilla Fútbol Club, which competes in La Liga (the highest level of the Spanish football league system).

=== Club background ===
- Club Deportivo Quintanar - (1961–1976)

- Sporting Quintanar - (1977–1993)
- Quintanar Club de Fútbol - (1995–1998)

- Atlético Quintanar-Santa Gema - (1998–2000)
- Club Deportivo Quintanar - (2000–present)

== Season to season ==
=== CD Quintanar ===
Season	Tier	Division	Place	Copa del Rey
1961–62	6	3ª Reg.	2nd	
1962–63	5	2ª Reg.	2nd	
1963–64	4	1ª Reg.	4th	
1964–65	4	1ª Reg.	5th	
1965–66	4	1ª Reg.	1st	
1966–67	3	3ª	9th	
1967–68	3	3ª	5th	
1968–69	3	3ª	7th	

Season	Tier	Division	Place	Copa del Rey
1969–70	3	3ª	17th	
1970–71	4	1ª Reg.	7th	
1971–72	4	1ª Reg.	15th	
1972–73	4	1ª Reg.	14th	
1973–74	5	1ª Reg.	15th	
1974–75	5	1ª Reg.	19th	
1975–76	6	2ª Reg.	(R)	

- 4 seasons in Tercera División

=== Sporting Quintanar ===
Season	Tier	Division	Place	Copa del Rey
1977–78	9	3ª Reg.	13th	
1978–79	9	3ª Reg.	10th	
1979–80	9	3ª Reg.	5th	
1980–81	9	3ª Reg.	1st	
1981–82	8	3ª Reg. P.	1st	
1982–83	7	2ª Reg.	5th	
1983–84	7	2ª Reg.	2nd	
1984–85	6	1ª Reg.	11th	

Season	Tier	Division	Place	Copa del Rey
1985–86	6	1ª Reg.	1st	
1986–87	5	Reg. Pref.	2nd	
1987–88	4	3ª	7th	
1988–89	4	3ª	5th	
1989–90	4	3ª	12th	
1990–91	4	3ª	12th	
1991–92	4	3ª	18th	
1992–93	5	Reg. Pref.	18th	

- 5 seasons in Tercera División

=== Quintanar CF ===
Season	Tier	Division	Place	Copa del Rey
1995–96	6	2ª Aut.	1st	
1996–97	5	1ª Aut.	13th	
1997–98	5	1ª Aut.	17th	

=== CD Quintanar ===
Season	Tier	Division	Place	Copa del Rey
1998–99	6	2ª Aut.	14th	
1999–00	6	2ª Aut.	9th	
2000–01	6	2ª Aut.	2nd	
2001–02	6	2ª Aut.	1st	
2002–03	5	1ª Aut.	4th	
2003–04	5	1ª Aut.	5th	
2004–05	5	1ª Aut.	2nd	
2005–06	4	3ª	18th	
2006–07	5	1ª Aut.	5th	
2007–08	5	Aut. Pref.	8th	
2008–09	5	Aut. Pref.	11th	
2009–10	5	Aut. Pref.	15th	
2010–11	6	1ª Aut.	8th	
2011–12	6	1ª Aut.	4th	
2012–13	6	1ª Aut.	1st	
2013–14	5	Aut. Pref.	7th	
2014–15	5	Aut. Pref.	9th	
2015–16	5	Aut. Pref.	3rd	
2016–17	5	Aut. Pref.	2nd	
2017–18	5	Aut. Pref.	2nd	

Season	Tier	Division	Place	Copa del Rey
2018–19	5	Aut. Pref.	7th	
2019–20	5	Aut. Pref.	4th	
2020–21	5	Aut. Pref.	3rd	
2021–22	6	Aut. Pref.	9th	
2022–23	6	Aut. Pref.	3rd	
2023–24	6	Aut. Pref.	9th	First round
2024–25	6	Aut. Pref.	9th	
2025–26	6	Aut. Pref.	7th	

- 1 season in Tercera División
