= Manzanares CF =

Manzanares
- Full name: Manzanares Club de Fútbol
- Nickname: Los Franjiblancos (The White Sash)
- Founded: 1949 (folded 2025)
- Ground: José Camacho, Manzanares, Castile-La Mancha, Spain
- Capacity: 3,200
- President: (Spain) José Jiménez Guijarro
- Head coach: (Spain) Loren Navarro
- League: Primera Autonómica Preferente – Group 1
- 2025–26: Primera Autonómica Preferente – Group 1, 2nd of 18
Home colours	Away colours

Manzanares Club de Fútbol is a Spanish football team based in Manzanares, Castile-La Mancha. Founded in 1949, the team plays in Primera Autonómica Preferente – Group 1. The club's home ground is the José Camacho.

== Season to season ==
Season	Tier	Division	Place	Copa del Rey
1943–44	4	1ª Reg.	1st	
1944–45	4	1ª Reg.	3rd	
1945–46	4	1ª Reg.	3rd	
1946–47	4	1ª Reg.	1st	
1947–48	4	1ª Reg.	1st	
1948–49	4	1ª Reg.	4th	
1949–50	4	1ª Reg.	1st	
1950–51	DNP			
1951–52	4	1ª Reg.	10th	
1952–53	4	1ª Reg.	3rd	
1953–54	4	1ª Reg.	2nd	
1954–55	4	1ª Reg.	5th	
1955–56	4	1ª Reg.	2nd	
1956–57	3	3ª	15th	
1957–58	3	3ª	15th	
1958–59	4	1ª Reg.	1st	
1959–60	3	3ª	8th	
1960–61	3	3ª	14th	
1961–62	4	1ª Reg.	2nd	
1962–63	4	1ª Reg.	5th	

Season	Tier	Division	Place	Copa del Rey
1963–64	DNP			
1964–65	DNP			
1965–66	4	1ª Reg.	6th	
1966–67	5	2ª Reg.	7th	
1967–68	5	2ª Reg.	10th	
1968–69	5	2ª Reg.	12th	
1969–70	5	2ª Reg.	10th	
1970–71	5	2ª Reg.	11th	
1971–72	5	2ª Reg.	7th	
1972–73	5	2ª Reg.	19th	
1973–74	7	3ª Reg. P.	1st	
1974–75	6	2ª Reg.	6th	
1975–76	6	2ª Reg.	2nd	
1976–77	5	1ª Reg.	3rd	
1977–78	5	Reg. Pref.	8th	
1978–79	5	Reg. Pref.	13th	
1979–80	5	Reg. Pref.	13th	
1980–81	5	Reg. Pref.	14th	
1981–82	5	Reg. Pref.	12th	
1982–83	5	Reg. Pref.	16th	

Season	Tier	Division	Place	Copa del Rey
1983–84	5	Reg. Pref.	14th	
1984–85	5	Reg. Pref.	18th	
1985–86	6	1ª Reg.	3rd	
1986–87	5	Reg. Pref.	8th	
1987–88	5	Reg. Pref.	10th	
1988–89	5	Reg. Pref.	2nd	
1989–90	4	3ª	9th	
1990–91	4	3ª	15th	
1991–92	4	3ª	16th	
1992–93	4	3ª	4th	
1993–94	4	3ª	7th	First round
1994–95	4	3ª	7th	
1995–96	4	3ª	4th	
1996–97	4	3ª	19th	
1997–98	5	1ª Aut.	10th	
1998–99	5	1ª Aut.	6th	
1999–2000	5	1ª Aut.	1st	
2000–01	4	3ª	17th	
2001–02	4	3ª	16th	
2002–03	4	3ª	13th	

Season	Tier	Division	Place	Copa del Rey
2003–04	4	3ª	17th	
2004–05	DNP			
2005–06	6	2ª Aut.	2nd	
2006–07	6	2ª Aut.	7th	
2007–08	6	1ª Aut.	1st	
2008–09	5	Aut. Pref.	6th	
2009–10	5	Aut. Pref.	1st	
2010–11	4	3ª	13th	
2011–12	4	3ª	15th	
2012–13	4	3ª	13th	
2013–14	4	3ª	11th	
2014–15	4	3ª	4th	
2014–15	4	3ª	16th	
2016–17	5	Aut. Pref.	8th	
2017–18	5	Aut. Pref.	4th	
2018–19	5	Aut. Pref.	5th	
2019–20	5	Aut. Pref.	1st	
2020–21	4	3ª	9th / 10th	
2021–22	6	Aut. Pref.	3rd	
2022–23	6	Aut. Pref.	12th	

Season	Tier	Division	Place	Copa del Rey
2023–24	6	Aut. Pref.	3rd	
2024–25	5	3ª Fed.	18th	
2025–26	6	Aut. Pref.		

- 23 seasons in Tercera División
- 1 season in Tercera Federación
