= CD Marchamalo =

Spanish football team

Marchamalo
- Full name: Club Deportivo Marchamalo
- Founded: 1973
- Ground: La Solana; Marchamalo, Spain
- Capacity: 1,000
- Chairman: (Spain) Juan Carlos Alvaro Diaz
- Manager: (Spain) Juan Alonso Merino
- League: Tercera Federación – Group 18
- 2025–26: Tercera Federación – Group 18, 13th of 18
- Website: https://www.cdmarchamalo.es/
Home colours	Away colours

Club Deportivo Marchamalo is a football team based in Marchamalo. Founded in 1973, the team plays in Tercera Federación – Group 18. The club's home ground is Estadio La Solana.

== Season to season ==
Season	Tier	Division	Place	Copa del Rey
1973–74	8	3ª Reg.	4th	
1974–75	7	3ª Reg. P.	15th	
1975–76	6	2ª Reg.	5th	
1976–77	6	2ª Reg.	11th	
1977–78	7	2ª Reg.	10th	
1978–79	7	2ª Reg.	13th	
1979–80	7	2ª Reg.	6th	
1980–81	7	2ª Reg.	10th	
1981–82	7	2ª Reg.	13th	
1982–83	7	2ª Reg.	3rd	
1983–84	6	1ª Reg.	10th	
1984–85	6	1ª Reg.	8th	
1985–86	6	1ª Reg.	10th	
1986–87	6	1ª Reg.	2nd	
1987–88	5	Reg. Pref.	14th	
1988–89	5	Reg. Pref.	13th	
1989–90	5	Reg. Pref.	15th	
1990–91	6	1ª Reg.	1st	
1991–92	5	Reg. Pref.	14th	
1992–93	6	1ª Reg.	6th	

Season	Tier	Division	Place	Copa del Rey
1993–94	6	1ª Reg.	9th	
1994–95	5	Reg. Pref.	16th	
1995–96	6	2ª Aut.	3rd	
1996–97	6	2ª Aut.	1st	
1997–98	5	1ª Aut.	11th	
1998–99	5	1ª Aut.	11th	
1999–2000	5	1ª Aut.	16th	
2000–01	6	2ª Aut.	1st	
2001–02	6	2ª Aut.	2nd	
2002–03	5	1ª Aut.	6th	
2003–04	5	1ª Aut.	8th	
2004–05	5	1ª Aut.	2nd	
2005–06	4	3ª	14th	
2006–07	4	3ª	11th	
2007–08	4	3ª	12th	
2008–09	4	3ª	11th	
2009–10	4	3ª	8th	
2010–11	4	3ª	8th	
2011–12	4	3ª	10th	
2012–13	4	3ª	18th	

Season	Tier	Division	Place	Copa del Rey
2013–14	5	Aut. Pref.	1st	
2014–15	4	3ª	7th	
2015–16	4	3ª	9th	
2016–17	4	3ª	11th	
2017–18	4	3ª	12th	
2018–19	4	3ª	19th	
2019–20	5	Aut. Pref.	1st	
2020–21	4	3ª	1st / 1st	First round
2021–22	4	2ª RFEF	16th	First round
2022–23	5	3ª Fed.	10th	
2023–24	5	3ª Fed.	13th	
2024–25	5	3ª Fed.	13th	
2025–26	5	3ª Fed.	13th	
2026–27	5	3ª Fed.		

- 1 season in Segunda División RFEF
- 14 seasons in Tercera División
- 5 seasons in Tercera Federación
