= Campillo de Altobuey =

Municipality of Spain

- Municipality
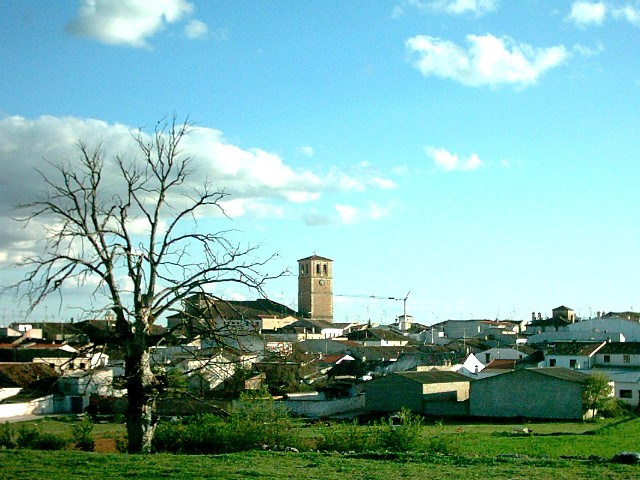

- Coat of arms

- Location within Spain Location within Castilla-La Mancha
- Coordinates: 39°36′N 1°47′W
- Country: Spain
- Autonomous community: Castile-La Mancha
- Province: Cuenca

Population (2025-01-01)
  - Total: 1,312
- Time zone: UTC+1 (CET)
  - Summer (DST): UTC+2 (CEST)

Campillo de Altobuey is a municipality in Cuenca, Castile-La Mancha, Spain. It has a population of 1,691.

== Situation ==
Campillo de Altobuey is located in the Manchuela of Cuenca, halfway between Cuenca (65 km; 40 mi) and Albacete (90 km; 56 mi) and also between Madrid (200 km; 120 mi) and Valencia (135 km; 84 mi).

It is a typical village of Castile, with a high tower visible from several kilometres around.

== Population ==
The population in earlier centuries reached four thousand. Since 1900, the population has dropped, especially in the 1960s and 1970s, as a result of emigration, mainly to Valencia.

== Interesting places ==
- The Parochial Church of San Andrés, located in the main square, is a columnar temple, with three ships and plant of hall. Its construction dates from the 16th century, but in the 17th century the valuable original caissoned ceiling with tube vaults was covered and it was constructed to a cupola in the cruise, decorated with rich paintings murals. Account with a tower of high altitude and five bodies.
- The old convent of San Agustín and present Sanctuary of the Virgin of the Hill is one of the best examples of the Baroque one of the province of River basin. It was constructed at the beginning of the 18th century, with ship of Latin cross plant with lateral chapels, great cupola on the cruise, baroque altarpieces and abundant ornamentation of foliages in walls and vaults. In the place that occupied cloister of the convent, a Bullring was constructed after the confiscation, that comes using until the present time.
- The hermitage of the also well-known Trinidad as Eternal Father is located when coming out towards Motilla del Palancar. It is of end of 16th century. The ship is covered by a Renaissance ceiling with paintings of Hernando de Mayorga.
- Hermitage of the Christ, is of sober a baroque one being remarkable the cover of the hermitage and the inner altarpiece. Adjacent is the old hospital, now dedicated to lodge the House of Culture.
- The existence of an old wind mill is remarkable in the environs.
- In addition to the monumental wealth, Campillo counts on zones of natural and landscaping interest as they are the pine of San Isidro or the hill of Santa Quiteria.

== Economy ==
- Agriculture

Cultivations of different products practices: cereals, vineyards, olive tree, lentils, garlic… Campillo always has been known by its saffron, and although its culture has diminished much, exists an enterprise initiative to commercialize it at national and even at international level. The Agricultural Cooperative San Andrés Apóstolcounts on around 800 partners. One is in charge to serve to the agriculturists (cereal distribution, seeds and installments) and also works as wine warehouse and oil mill.

- Industry

It is limited to a textile factory that has avoided the emigration from many people to other places.

== Celebrations ==
- From 7 to 14 September: Main holidays in honour of the Virgin of the Loma
- 17 January: San Antón
- 15 May: San Isidro
