= CF La Solana =

Association football club in Spain

La Solana
- Full name: Club de Fútbol La Solana
- Founded: 1971
- Ground: La Moheda, La Solana, Ciudad Real, Castilla-La Mancha, Spain
- Capacity: 2,000
- President: Julián Martín-Zarco
- Head coach: Manolo Alfaro
- League: Tercera Federación – Group 18
- 2025–26: Tercera Federación – Group 18, 14th of 18
Home colours	Away colours

Club de Fútbol La Solana is a Spanish football team based in La Solana, Ciudad Real, in the autonomous community of Castilla-La Mancha. Founded in 1971, they play in Tercera Federación – Group 18, holding home games at Estadio La Moheda, with a capacity of 2,000 people.

== Season to season ==
Season	Tier	Division	Place	Copa del Rey
1971–72	8	3ª Reg.	12th	
1972–73	8	3ª Reg.	1st	
1973–74	6	2ª Reg.	3rd	
1974–75	5	1ª Reg.	4th	
1975–76	5	1ª Reg.	9th	
1976–77	5	1ª Reg.	15th	
1977–78	6	1ª Reg.	8th	
1978–79	6	1ª Reg.	5th	
1979–80	6	1ª Reg.	18th	
1980–81	7	2ª Reg.	3rd	
1981–82	6	1ª Reg.	8th	
1982–83	6	1ª Reg.	9th	
1983–84	6	1ª Reg.	17th	
1984–85	DNP			
1985–86	6	1ª Reg.	12th	
1986–87	5	Reg. Pref.	18th	
1987–88	5	Reg. Pref.	4th	
1988–89	5	Reg. Pref.	2nd	
1989–90	4	3ª	11th	
1990–91	4	3ª	14th	

Season	Tier	Division	Place	Copa del Rey
1991–92	4	3ª	10th	
1992–93	4	3ª	18th	
1993–94	5	Reg. Pref.	2nd	
1994–95	4	3ª	12th	
1995–96	4	3ª	14th	
1996–97	4	3ª	12th	
1997–98	4	3ª	16th	
1998–99	4	3ª	16th	
1999–2000	4	3ª	20th	
2000–01	5	1ª Aut.	4th	
2001–02	5	1ª Aut.	10th	
2002–03	5	1ª Aut.	2nd	
2003–04	4	3ª	12th	
2004–05	4	3ª	13th	
2005–06	4	3ª	15th	
2006–07	4	3ª	18th	
2007–08	5	Aut. Pref.	16th	
2008–09	6	1ª Aut.	1st	
2009–10	5	Aut. Pref.	3rd	
2010–11	5	Aut. Pref.	4th	

Season	Tier	Division	Place	Copa del Rey
2011–12	5	Aut. Pref.	4th	
2012–13	5	Aut. Pref.	5th	
2013–14	5	Aut. Pref.	5th	
2014–15	5	Aut. Pref.	3rd	
2015–16	5	Aut. Pref.	3rd	
2016–17	5	Aut. Pref.	4th	
2017–18	5	Aut. Pref.	2nd	
2018–19	4	3ª	13th	
2019–20	4	3ª	10th	
2020–21	4	3ª	10th / 5th	
2021–22	6	Aut. Pref.	1st	
2022–23	5	3ª Fed.	14th	
2023–24	5	3ª Fed.	15th	
2024–25	6	Aut. Pref.	2nd	
2025–26	5	3ª Fed.	14th	
2026–27	5	3ª Fed.		

- 17 seasons in Tercera División
- 4 seasons in Tercera Federación
