= CD Noblejas =

Spanish football team

Noblejas
- Full name: Club Deportivo Noblejas
- Founded: 1950
- Ground: Municipal Ángel Luengo; Noblejas, Castilla-La Mancha, Spain
- Capacity: 1,500
- President: Inmaculada Gómez
- Manager: Neftalí Pinazo
- League: Tercera Federación – Group 18
- 2025–26: Primera Autonómica Preferente – Group 2, 3rd of 18 (promoted via play-offs)
- Website: https://www.cdnoblejas.com/
Home colours	Away colours

Club Deportivo Noblejas is a football team based in Noblejas. Founded in 1950, they play in Tercera Federación – Group 18, holding home matches at the Estadio Municipal Ángel Luengo, with a capacity of 1,500 people.

== Season to season ==
Season	Tier	Division	Place	Copa del Rey
1984–85	9	3ª Reg.	4th	
1985–86	9	3ª Reg.	2nd	
1986–87	7	2ª Reg.	9th	
1987–88	7	2ª Reg.	9th	
1988–89	7	2ª Reg.	6th	
1989–90	7	2ª Reg.	8th	
1990–91	7	2ª Reg.	(R)	
1991–1995	DNP			
1995–96	6	2ª Aut.	13th	
1996–97	6	2ª Aut.	9th	
1997–98	6	2ª Aut.	8th	
1998–99	6	2ª Aut.	11th	
1999–2000	6	2ª Aut.	13th	
2000–01	6	2ª Aut.	8th	
2001–02	6	2ª Aut.	3rd	
2002–03	6	2ª Aut.	4th	
2003–04	6	2ª Aut.	1st	
2004–05	5	1ª Aut.	19th	
2005–06	6	2ª Aut.	2nd	
2006–07	6	2ª Aut.	2nd	

Season	Tier	Division	Place	Copa del Rey
2007–08	6	1ª Aut.	2nd	
2008–09	5	Aut. Pref.	7th	
2009–10	5	Aut. Pref.	12th	
2010–11	5	Aut. Pref.	7th	
2011–12	5	Aut. Pref.	4th	
2012–13	6	1ª Aut.	9th	
2013–14	6	1ª Aut.	8th	
2014–15	6	1ª Aut.	4th	
2015–16	6	1ª Aut.	7th	
2016–17	6	1ª Aut.	6th	
2017–18	6	1ª Aut.	4th	
2018–19	6	1ª Aut.	3rd	
2019–20	5	Aut. Pref.	5th	
2020–21	5	Aut. Pref.	5th	
2021–22	6	Aut. Pref.	3rd	
2022–23	6	Aut. Pref.	2nd	
2023–24	6	Aut. Pref.	1st	
2024–25	5	3ª Fed.	17th	
2025–26	6	Aut. Pref.	3rd	
2026–27	5	3ª Fed.		

- 2 seasons in Tercera Federación
