= CD Azuqueca =

Association football club in Spain

Azuqueca
- Full name: Club Deportivo Azuqueca
- Founded: 1971
- Ground: San Miguel, Azuqueca, Castile-La Mancha, Spain
- Capacity: 2,000
- Chairman: (Spain) Miguel Ángel Martínez
- Manager: (Spain) Alberto Parras
- League: Primera Autonómica Preferente – Group 2
- 2025–26: Tercera Federación – Group 18, 15th of 18 (relegated)
Home colours	Away colours

Club Deportivo Azuqueca is a Spanish football team based in Azuqueca de Henares, Guadalajara, in the autonomous community of Castile-La Mancha. Founded in 1971 it plays in Primera Autonómica Preferente – Group 2, holding home games at Estadio San Miguel, which holds 2,000 spectators.

== Season to season ==
Season	Tier	Division	Place	Copa del Rey
1972–73	8	3ª Reg.	5th	
1973–74	8	3ª Reg.	9th	
1974–75	8	3ª Reg.	2nd	
1975–76	7	3ª Reg. P.	3rd	
1976–77	6	2ª Reg.	4th	
1977–78	6	1ª Reg.	7th	
1978–79	6	1ª Reg.	14th	
1979–80	6	1ª Reg.	9th	
1980–81	6	1ª Reg.	11th	
1981–82	6	1ª Reg.	6th	
1982–83	6	1ª Reg.	1st	
1983–84	5	Reg. Pref.	2nd	
1984–85	4	3ª	10th	
1985–86	4	3ª	16th	
1986–87	5	Reg. Pref.	3rd	
1987–88	4	3ª	13th	
1988–89	4	3ª	11th	
1989–90	4	3ª	13th	
1990–91	4	3ª	16th	
1991–92	4	3ª	13th	

Season	Tier	Division	Place	Copa del Rey
1992–93	4	3ª	11th	
1993–94	4	3ª	14th	
1994–95	4	3ª	10th	
1995–96	4	3ª	12th	
1996–97	4	3ª	16th	
1997–98	4	3ª	20th	
1998–99	5	1ª Aut.	4th	
1999–2000	5	1ª Aut.	8th	
2000–01	5	1ª Aut.	6th	
2001–02	5	1ª Aut.	9th	
2002–03	5	1ª Aut.	8th	
2003–04	5	1ª Aut.	15th	
2004–05	5	1ª Aut.	8th	
2005–06	5	1ª Aut.	4th	
2006–07	5	1ª Aut.	3rd	
2007–08	4	3ª	9th	
2008–09	4	3ª	16th	
2009–10	4	3ª	3rd	
2010–11	4	3ª	7th	
2011–12	4	3ª	3rd	

Season	Tier	Division	Place	Copa del Rey
2012–13	4	3ª	3rd	
2013–14	4	3ª	19th	
2014–15	5	Aut. Pref.	1st	
2015–16	4	3ª	3rd	
2016–17	4	3ª	9th	
2017–18	4	3ª	10th	
2018–19	4	3ª	10th	
2019–20	4	3ª	12th	
2020–21	4	3ª	7th / 1st	
2021–22	5	3ª RFEF	8th	
2022–23	5	3ª Fed.	12th	
2023–24	5	3ª Fed.	10th	
2024–25	5	3ª Fed.	14th	
2025–26	5	3ª Fed.		

- 26 seasons in Tercera División
- 5 seasons in Tercera Federación/Tercera División RFEF
