= La Roda CF =

Association football club in Spain

La Roda
- Full name: La Roda Club de Fútbol
- Founded: 1996; 30 years ago
- Ground: Estadio Municipal; La Roda, Spain
- Capacity: 3,000
- President: (Spain) Juan Francisco Toboso
- Head coach: (Spain) Sergio Rubio
- League: Primera Autonómica Preferente – Group 1
- 2024–25: Primera Autonómica Preferente – Group 1, 3rd of 18
Home colours	Away colours

La Roda Club de Fútbol is a Spanish football club based in La Roda, in the autonomous community of Castile-La Mancha. Founded in 1996 it plays in Primera Autonómica Preferente – Group 1, holding home games at Estadio Municipal de Deportes, which has a capacity of 3,000 spectators.

== History ==
Founded in 1996 as Sporting La Roda, the club adopted its current name in 1999, with Emilio López as its president.

=== Club background ===
- Sporting La Roda (1996–1999)
- La Roda Caja Rural Club de Fútbol (1999–2005)
- La Roda Club de Fútbol (2005–)

== Season to season ==
Season	Tier	Division	Place	Copa del Rey
1996–97	6	2ª Aut.	2nd	
1997–98	6	2ª Aut.	3rd	
1998–99	6	2ª Aut.	5th	
1999–2000	6	2ª Aut.	1st	
2000–01	5	1ª Aut.	1st	
2001–02	4	3ª	10th	
2002–03	4	3ª	9th	
2003–04	4	3ª	4th	
2004–05	4	3ª	6th	
2005–06	4	3ª	11th	
2006–07	4	3ª	5th	
2007–08	4	3ª	11th	
2008–09	4	3ª	14th	
2009–10	4	3ª	1st	
2010–11	4	3ª	3rd	First round
2011–12	3	2ª B	9th	
2012–13	3	2ª B	10th	First round
2013–14	3	2ª B	17th	
2014–15	3	2ª B	15th	
2015–16	3	2ª B	15th	

Season	Tier	Division	Place	Copa del Rey
2016–17	3	2ª B	20th	
2017–18	4	3ª	11th	
2018–19	4	3ª	7th	
2019–20	4	3ª	15th	
2020–21	4	3ª	11th	
2021–22	5	3ª RFEF	(DQ)	
2022–23	6	Aut. Pref.	15th	
2023–24	6	Aut. Pref.	13th	
2024–25	6	Aut. Pref.	3rd	
2025–26	6	Aut. Pref.		

- 6 seasons in Segunda División B
- 14 seasons in Tercera División
- 1 season in Tercera División RFEF
