= CD Toledo B =

Spanish football team

Toledo B
- Full name: Club Deportivo Toledo, S.A.D. "B"
- Founded: 1996
- Ground: Salto del Caballo, Toledo, Castile-La Mancha, Spain
- Capacity: 5,300
- President: (Spain) Fernando Collazo
- Head coach: (Spain) Francisco Cano
- League: Primera Autonómica Preferente – Group 2
- 2024–25: Primera Autonómica Preferente – Group 2, 15th of 18
Home colours	Away colours

Club Deportivo Toledo, S.A.D. "B" is the reserve team of CD Toledo, a Spanish football team based in Toledo, in the autonomous community of Castile-La Mancha. Founded in 1996, it plays in Primera Autonómica Preferente – Group 2, holding home games at Estadio Salto del Caballo, with a seating capacity of 5,300 spectators.

Home kits consist of green shirts and white shorts.

== Season to season ==
Season	Tier	Division	Place
1996–97	6	2ª Aut.	1st
1997–98	5	1ª Aut.	1st
1998–99	4	3ª	7th
1999–2000	4	3ª	19th
2000–01	5	1ª Aut.	1st
2001–02	4	3ª	13th
2002–03	4	3ª	14th
2003–04	4	3ª	19th
2004–05	5	1ª Aut.	15th
2005–06	5	1ª Aut.	10th
2006–07	5	1ª Aut.	18th
2007–08	7	2ª Aut.	1st
2008–09	6	1ª Aut.	3rd
2009–10	5	Aut. Pref.	17th
2010–11	6	1ª Aut.	4th
2011–12	6	1ª Aut.	6th
2012–13	6	1ª Aut.	3rd
2013–14	5	Aut. Pref.	2nd
2014–15	4	3ª	12th
2015–16	4	3ª	11th

Season	Tier	Division	Place
2016–17	4	3ª	17th
2017–18	5	Aut. Pref.	12th
2018–19	5	Aut. Pref.	13th
2019–20	5	Aut. Pref.	6th
2020–21	5	Aut. Pref.	8th
2021–22	6	Aut. Pref.	9th
2022–23	6	Aut. Pref.	10th
2023–24	6	Aut. Pref.	15th
2024–25	7	1ª Aut.	1st
2025–26	6	Aut. Pref.	

- 8 seasons in Tercera División
