= CD Villacañas =

Spanish football team

Villacañas
- Full name: Club Deportivo Fibritel Villacañas
- Founded: 1998
- Ground: Las Piramides, Villacañas, Castile-La Mancha, Spain
- Capacity: 2,000
- Chairman: Toribio Santos
- Manager: Fernando Lominchar
- League: Tercera Federación – Group 18
- 2025–26: Tercera Federación – Group 18, 7th of 18
Home colours

Club Deportivo Villacañas, named Club Deportivo Fibritel Villacañas for sponsorship reasons, is a Spanish football team based in Villacañas, in the autonomous community of Castile-La Mancha. Founded in 1998, it plays in Tercera Federación – Group 18, holding home matches at Campo Municipal de Fútbol de Las Pirámides.

== Season to season ==
Season	Tier	Division	Place	Copa del Rey
1998–99	6	2ª Aut.	4th	
1999–2000	6	2ª Aut.	2nd	
2000–01	5	1ª Aut.	11th	
2001–02	5	1ª Aut.	6th	
2002–03	5	1ª Aut.	9th	
2003–04	5	1ª Aut.	6th	
2004–05	5	1ª Aut.	1st	
2005–06	4	3ª	19th	
2006–07	5	1ª Aut.	7th	
2007–08	5	Aut. Pref.	5th	
2008–09	5	Aut. Pref.	9th	
2009–10	5	Aut. Pref.	15th	
2010–11	6	1ª Aut.	1st	
2011–12	5	Aut. Pref.	7th	
2012–13	5	Aut. Pref.	4th	
2013–14	5	Aut. Pref.	3rd	
2014–15	5	Aut. Pref.	4th	
2015–16	5	Aut. Pref.	7th	
2016–17	5	Aut. Pref.	1st	
2017–18	4	3ª	14th	

Season	Tier	Division	Place	Copa del Rey
2018–19	4	3ª	17th	
2019–20	4	3ª	14th	
2020–21	4	3ª	5th / 4th	
2021–22	5	3ª RFEF	11th	
2022–23	5	3ª Fed.	7th	
2023–24	5	3ª Fed.	11th	
2024–25	5	3ª Fed.	4th	
2025–26	5	3ª Fed.	7th	
2026–27	5	3ª Fed.		

- 5 seasons in Tercera División
- 6 seasons in Tercera Federación/Tercera División RFEF
