= CD Illescas =

Association football club in Spain

Illescas
- Full name: Club Deportivo Illescas
- Founded: 1946
- Ground: Estadio Municipal, Illescas, Spain
- Capacity: 1,000
- Chairman: (Spain) Francisco García
- Manager: (Spain) Albert Ferri
- League: Tercera Federación – Group 18
- 2025–26: Tercera Federación – Group 18, 12th of 18
Home colours	Away colours

Club Deportivo Illescas is a Spanish football team based in Illescas, in the autonomous community of Castile-La Mancha. Founded in 1946, it plays in Tercera Federación – Group 18, holding home matches at Estadio Municipal de Illescas, with a capacity of 1,000 spectators.

== Season to season ==
Season	Tier	Division	Place	Copa del Rey
1965–66	6	3ª Reg.	1st	
1966–67	5	2ª Reg.	14th	
1967–68	5	2ª Reg.	16th	
1968–69	6	3ª Reg.	12th	
1969–70	7	3ª Reg.	8th	
1970–71	7	3ª Reg.		
1971–72	7	3ª Reg.	15th	
1972–73	7	3ª Reg.	10th	
1973–74	8	3ª Reg.	6th	
1974–75	8	3ª Reg.	2nd	
1975–76	7	3ª Reg. P.	6th	
1976–77	7	3ª Reg. P.	4th	
1977–78	8	3ª Reg. P.	2nd	
1978–79	7	2ª Reg.	12th	
1979–80	7	2ª Reg.	17th	
1980–81	8	3ª Reg. P.	8th	
1981–82	8	3ª Reg. P.	9th	
1982–83	7	2ª Reg.	9th	
1983–84	7	2ª Reg.	1st	
1984–85	6	1ª Reg.	3rd	

Season	Tier	Division	Place	Copa del Rey
1985–86	6	1ª Reg.	2nd	
1986–87	5	Reg. Pref.	5th	
1987–88	4	3ª	20th	
1988–89	5	Reg. Pref.	7th	
1989–90	5	Reg. Pref.	10th	
1990–91	5	Reg. Pref.	3rd	
1991–92	5	Reg. Pref.	15th	
1992–93	6	1ª Reg.	5th	
1993–94	5	Reg. Pref.	14th	
1994–95	5	Reg. Pref.	4th	
1995–96	5	1ª Aut.	12th	
1996–97	5	1ª Aut.	6th	
1997–98	5	1ª Aut.	12th	
1998–99	5	1ª Aut.	14th	
1999–2000	5	1ª Aut.	5th	
2000–01	5	1ª Aut.	12th	
2001–02	5	1ª Aut.	16th	
2002–03	5	1ª Aut.	5th	
2003–04	5	1ª Aut.	3rd	
2004–05	5	1ª Aut.	1st	

Season	Tier	Division	Place	Copa del Rey
2005–06	4	3ª	17th	
2006–07	4	3ª	9th	
2007–08	4	3ª	7th	
2008–09	4	3ª	6th	
2009–10	4	3ª	2nd	
2010–11	4	3ª	6th	
2011–12	4	3ª	5th	
2012–13	4	3ª	11th	
2013–14	4	3ª	19th	
2014–15	5	Aut. Pref.	2nd	
2015–16	4	3ª	7th	
2016–17	4	3ª	18th	
2017–18	5	Aut. Pref.	3rd	
2018–19	5	Aut. Pref.	1st	
2019–20	4	3ª	17th	
2020–21	4	3ª	8th / 2nd	
2021–22	5	3ª RFEF	3rd	
2022–23	5	3ª Fed.	2nd	
2023–24	4	2ª Fed.	13th	
2024–25	4	2ª Fed.	16th	

Season	Tier	Division	Place	Copa del Rey
2025–26	5	3ª Fed.	12th	
2026–27	5	3ª Fed.		

- 2 seasons in Segunda Federación
- 14 seasons in Tercera División
- 4 seasons in Tercera Federación/Tercera División RFEF
