= CD Atlético Tomelloso =

Association football club in Spain

Atlético Tomelloso
- Full name: Club Deportivo Atlético Tomelloso
- Founded: 2012
- Ground: Paco Gálvez, Tomelloso, Castilla–La Mancha, Spain
- Capacity: 4,000
- President: Jorge Romero
- Manager: José Luis Morales
- League: Primera Autonómica Preferente – Group 1
- 2024–25: Primera Autonómica Preferente – Group 1, 6th of 18
- Website: atleticotomelloso.com
Home colours	Away colours

Club Deportivo Atlético Tomelloso is a Spanish football team located in Tomelloso, Ciudad Real, in the autonomous community of Castilla–La Mancha. Founded in 2012, they play in Primera Autonómica Preferente – Group 1, holding home matches at Estadio Municipal Paco Gálvez with a capacity of 4,000 people.

== History ==
Founded in 2012, Atlético Tomelloso became the main club of the city in 2015, after Tomelloso CF was dissolved. In April 2016, the club achieved a fourth promotion in their fifth season of their history, reaching Tercera División for the first time ever.

Relegated in 2019, Atlético Tomelloso returned to a national division in 2022, now to the fifth-tier Tercera Federación.

== Season to season ==
Season	Tier	Division	Place	Copa del Rey
2012–13	7	2ª Aut.	3rd	
2013–14	6	1ª Aut.	1st	
2014–15	5	Aut. Pref.	4th	
2015–16	5	Aut. Pref.	1st	
2016–17	4	3ª	13th	
2017–18	4	3ª	15th	
2018–19	4	3ª	18th	
2019–20	5	Aut. Pref.	7th	
2020–21	5	Aut. Pref.	4th	
2021–22	6	Aut. Pref.	2nd	
2022–23	5	3ª Fed.	15th	
2023–24	5	3ª Fed.	17th	
2024–25	6	Aut. Pref.	6th	
2025–26	6	Aut. Pref.		

- 3 seasons in Tercera Federación
