= Divisiones Regionales de Fútbol in Castilla-La Mancha =

The Divisiones Regionales de Fútbol in Castilla-La Mancha, organized by the Castilla-La Mancha Football Federation:

- Primera Autonómica Preferente, 2 Groups of 18 teams (Level 6 of the Spanish football pyramid)
- Primera División Autonómica, 4 Groups of 18 teams (Level 7)
- Segunda División Autonómica, 6 Groups of 18 teams (Level 8)

== League chronology ==
Timeline

- Included in Madrid until 1986

== Primera Autonómica Preferente ==
Primera Autonómica Preferente
- Founded: 1986
- Country: Spain
- Number of clubs: 36; 2 Groups of 18
- Level on pyramid: 6
- Promotion to: 3ª Federación – Group 18
- Relegation to: Primera Autonómica
- Website: Official website

Primera Autonómica Preferente is the sixth level of competition of the Spanish football league system in the Castilla-La Mancha.

=== League System ===
It consists of two groups of 18 teams. Group winners are promoted and runners-up plays a promotion playoffs. Last four teams of every group are relegated.

2012–13 Primera Autonómica Preferente – Group 1 teams
2012–13 Primera Autonómica Preferente – Group 2 teams

=== 2019–20 season teams ===
Group I	Group II
Atlético Tomelloso; Huracán de Balazote; Sporting La Gineta; Manzanares; Miguelturreño; San José Obrero; San Clemente; CD Quintanar; La Fuente; Daimiel RC; Campillo; Carrión; Sporting de Alcázar; Cultural Valdeganga; Membrilla; U. Criptanense; Atlético Tarazona; Almodóvar	Marchamalo; Mora; Hogar Alcarreño; Yuncos; Sonseca; Sp. Cabanillas; Horche; Pantoja; Formación Deportiva; Urda; Toledo B; Mocejón; Orgaceño; QUM; Puebla; Seseña; Patrocinio; Noblejas

=== Champions ===
Season	Gr. I	Gr. II	Gr. III
2025–26	UD Almansa	CD Villa	—
2024–25	AD San Clemente	CD Guadalajara B	—
2023–24	CD Pedroñeras	CD Noblejas	—
2022–23	Atlético Albacete	CD Cazalegas	—
2021–22	CF La Solana	CF Talavera de la Reina B	—
2020–21	AD San Clemente	CD Miguelturreño	AD Hogar Alcarreño
2019–20	Manzanares CF	CD Marchamalo	—
2018–19	CD Pedroñeras	CD Illescas	—
2017–18	Calvo Sotelo Puertollano CF	CD Tarancón	—
2016–17	Atlético Ibañés	CD Villacañas	—
2015–16	CD Atlético Tomelloso	CD Yuncos	—
2014–15	AD San José Obrero	CD Azuqueca	—
2013–14	Almagro CF	CD Marchamalo	—

== Primera División Autonómica ==
Primera División Autonómica
- Founded: 1986
- Country: Spain
- Number of clubs: 4 groups of 16 teams each
- Level on pyramid: 7
- Promotion to: Primera Autonómica Preferente
- Relegation to: Segunda División Autonómica
- Website: Official website

Primera División Autonómica is the seventh level of competition of the Spanish football league system in the Castilla-La Mancha.

== Segunda División Autonómica ==
Segunda División Autonómica
- Founded: 1986
- Country: Spain
- Number of clubs: -
- Level on pyramid: 8
- Promotion to: Primera División Autonómica
- Website: Official website

Segunda División Autonómica is the eighth level of competition of the Spanish football league system in the Castilla-La Mancha.
