= 2017–18 Copa Federación de España =

Tournament details
- Country: Spain
- Teams: 30 (in national phase)

Final positions
- Champions: Pontevedra (2nd title)
- Runners-up: Ontinyent

Tournament statistics
- Matches played: 58
- Goals scored: 145 (2.5 per match)

The 2017–18 Copa Federación de España was the 25th edition of the Copa Federación de España, also known as Copa RFEF, a knockout competition for Spanish football clubs in Segunda División B and Tercera División. Pontevedra won the tournament after winning 1–0 on aggregate score to Ontinyent.

The champion won the trophy, a cash prize of €90,152 and the qualification for the next year tournament. The runner-up received a cash prize of €30,051 and every semifinalist €12,020. Additionally, each winner of autonomous community tournament received €3,005.

The competition began in late July 2017 with the first games of the Regional stages and finished 11 April 2018 with the national final.

== Regional tournaments ==
=== West Andalusia and Ceuta tournament ===
The draw was made 4 August.

Semi-final
14 and 23 August
Algeciras	2	1	3
San Fernando	1	1	2

Final
30 August and 6 September
Algeciras	2	0	2
Betis Deportivo	2	1	3

==== Semifinal ====
14 August 2017	Algeciras	2–1	San Fernando	Algeciras
21:00	Berlanga 33'; Pablo Ganet 72'	Algeciras CF Report (in Spanish)	Aguilera 37'	Stadium: Estadio Nuevo Mirador; Referee: Abraham Domínguez Cervantes

23 August 2017	San Fernando	1–1 (2–3 agg.)	Algeciras	San Fernando
21:30	Aguilera 33'	Algeciras CF Report (in Spanish)	Chico Díaz 57'	Stadium: Estadio Iberoamericano Bahía Sur; Referee: Aleksandar Jovanovic

==== Final ====
30 August 2017	Algeciras	2–2	Betis Deportivo	Algeciras
21:00	Ranchero 45'; Anaya 90+4'	Report	Nieto 13'; Irizo 90+2'	Stadium: Nuevo Mirador

6 September 2017	Betis Deportivo	1–0 (3–2 agg.)	Algeciras	Seville
21:00	Liberto Beltrán 45'	Report		Stadium: Luis del Sol

Match was abandoned at halftime after power failure and Algeciras renounced to continue the match.

=== East Andalusia and Melilla tournament ===
Huétor Tájar was the only registered team and qualified directly for national phase.

=== Aragon tournament ===
For the 2017–18 edition, the Aragonese Football Federation agreed to change the competition format to two groups of four teams, where after a single-leg round robin tournament, the two group winners will qualify to the Regional final.

==== Group 1 ====
Pos	Team	Pld	W	D	L	GF	GA	GD	Pts	Qualification	UTE	TER	EJE	BOR
1	Utebo	3	3	0	0	6	2	+4	9	Qualification to the final	—	1–0	—	2–1
2	Teruel	3	2	0	1	4	2	+2	6		—	—	2–0	—
3	Ejea	3	1	0	2	3	6	−3	3		1–3	—	—	2–1
4	Borja	3	0	0	3	3	6	−3	0		—	1–2	—	—

Updated to match(es) played on 20 August 2017. Source: Aragonese Football Federation
Rules for classification: 1) Points; 2) Head-to-head results; 3) Goal difference; 4) Number of goals scored.

==== Group 2 ====
Pos	Team	Pld	W	D	L	GF	GA	GD	Pts	Qualification	ROB	ALM	TAM	SAB
1	Robres	3	2	1	0	7	3	+4	7	Qualification to the final	—	—	4–1	1–0
2	Almudévar	3	1	1	1	7	7	0	4		2–2	—	—	1–2
3	Tamarite	3	1	0	2	7	10	−3	3		—	3–4	—	—
4	Sabiñánigo	3	1	0	2	4	5	−1	3		—	—	2–3	—

Updated to match(es) played on 20 August 2017. Source: Aragonese Football Federation
Rules for classification: 1) Points; 2) Head-to-head results; 3) Goal difference; 4) Number of goals scored.

==== Final ====
30 August 2017	Utebo	1–1 (4–2 p)	Robres	Utebo
20:00	Rupérez 11'	Report	Larios 62'	Stadium: Santa Ana

=== Asturias tournament ===
The twelve qualified teams were divided into four groups of three teams, where the winners will qualify for the semifinals. Teams were drawn according to their league positions in the previous season.

The final was played at Estadio El Bayu, Siero, as part of the celebrations of the 100th anniversary of Club Siero.

Pot 1	Pot 2	Pot 3
Sporting Gijón B^{TH} Lealtad; Caudal; Langreo	Tuilla; Oviedo B Marino Luanco; Covadonga	Condal; Ceares; Llanes; Colunga

==== Group 1 ====
Pos	Team	Pld	W	D	L	GF	GA	GD	Pts	Qualification	COV	CAU	LLA
1	Covadonga	4	3	0	1	8	4	+4	9	Qualification to the semifinals	—	2–0	4–2
2	Caudal	4	2	1	1	5	4	+1	7		2–0	—	3–0
3	Llanes	4	0	1	3	4	11	−7	1		0–2	2–2	—

Updated to match(es) played on 12 August 2017. Source: Fútbol Asturiano
Rules for classification: 1) Points; 2) Head-to-head results; 3) Goal difference; 4) Number of goals scored.

==== Group 2 ====
Pos	Team	Pld	W	D	L	GF	GA	GD	Pts	Qualification	MAR	LEA	CON
1	Marino Luanco	4	3	1	0	8	1	+7	10	Qualification to the semifinals	—	1–1	2–0
2	Lealtad	4	2	1	1	3	5	−2	7		0–4	—	1–0
3	Condal	4	0	0	4	0	5	−5	0		0–1	0–1	—

Updated to match(es) played on 13 August 2017. Source: Fútbol Asturiano
Rules for classification: 1) Points; 2) Head-to-head results; 3) Goal difference; 4) Number of goals scored.

==== Group 3 ====
Pos	Team	Pld	W	D	L	GF	GA	GD	Pts	Qualification	SPO	OVI	CEA
1	Sporting Gijón B	4	3	0	1	4	2	+2	9	Qualification to the semifinals	—	1–0	1–2
2	Oviedo B	4	2	0	2	3	2	+1	6		0–1	—	2–0
3	Ceares	4	1	0	3	2	5	−3	3		0–1	0–1	—

Updated to match(es) played on 13 August 2017. Source: Fútbol Asturiano
Rules for classification: 1) Points; 2) Head-to-head results; 3) Goal difference; 4) Number of goals scored.

==== Group 4 ====
Pos	Team	Pld	W	D	L	GF	GA	GD	Pts	Qualification	LAN	TUI	COL
1	Langreo	4	2	1	1	6	4	+2	7	Qualification to the semifinals	—	1–2	3–2
2	Tuilla	4	2	1	1	6	6	0	7		0–2	—	1–1
3	Colunga	4	0	2	2	3	7	−4	2		0–0	0–3	—

Updated to match(es) played on 13 August 2017. Source: Fútbol Asturiano
Rules for classification: 1) Points; 2) Head-to-head results; 3) Goal difference; 4) Number of goals scored.

==== Final bracket ====
Semi-finals
14 and 28 September
Covadonga	2	0	2
Marino Luanco	2	2	4
13 and 27 September
Sporting Gijón B	0	1	1
Langreo	1	1	2

Final
12 October – Siero
Marino Luanco	0
Langreo (p)	0

===== Final =====
12 October 2017	Marino Luanco	0–0 (4–5 p)	Langreo	Siero
17:00		Report		Stadium: El Bayu; Attendance: 2,100; Referee: Cruzado Vicente
	Penalties
	Luis Morán; Riki; Pantiga; Pevida (penalty missed); Borja Álvarez		Omar; Castiello; Álvaro Cuello; Cris Montes; Álvaro García

=== Balearic Islands tournament ===
First round
30 August and 7 September
Alcúdia	1	0	1
Mallorca B	1	6	7

Semi-finals
13 and 20 September
Poblense	1	1	2
Mallorca B	2	1	3
13 and 20 September
Llosetense	0	0	0
Peña Deportiva (p)	0	0	0

Final
27 September and 4 October
Mallorca B	2	1	3
Peña Deportiva	1	1	2

==== Final ====
27 September 2017	Mallorca B	2–1	Peña Deportiva	Palma
17:00	James Davis 33'; Aleska 82'	Report	Joan Soldat 90+3'	Stadium: Son Bibiloni

4 October 2017	Peña Deportiva	1–1 (2–3 agg.)	Mallorca B	Santa Eulària
16:00	Rueda 72'	Report	Capella 6'	Stadium: Municipal

=== Basque Country tournament ===
Four teams of the Group 4 of Tercera División and two of Segunda División B registered for the tournament (Alavés B, Amorebieta, Amurrio, Gernika, Getxo and R. Sociedad C). Tournament will be played in two stages, the first with two groups of three teams and the winner will play the final over two matches. The group stage phase was drawn on 4 September by Basque Football Federation.

==== Group 1 ====
Pos	Team	Pld	W	D	L	GF	GA	GD	Pts	Qualification	GET	AMU	RSO
1	Getxo	2	1	1	0	5	4	+1	4	Qualification to the semifinals	—	—	2–2
2	Amurrio	2	1	0	1	3	3	0	3		2–3	—	—
3	Real Sociedad C	2	0	1	1	2	3	−1	1		—	0–1	—

Updated to match(es) played on 27 September 2017. Source: Basque Football Federation
Rules for classification: 1) Points; 2) Head-to-head results; 3) Goal difference; 4) Number of goals scored.

==== Group 2 ====
Pos	Team	Pld	W	D	L	GF	GA	GD	Pts	Qualification	ALA	AMO	GER
1	Alavés B	2	1	1	0	4	3	+1	4	Qualification to the semifinals	—	—	2–2
2	Amorebieta	2	1	0	1	2	2	0	3		1–2	—	—
3	Gernika	2	0	1	1	2	3	−1	1		—	0–1	—

Updated to match(es) played on 27 September 2017. Source: Basque Football Federation
Rules for classification: 1) Points; 2) Head-to-head results; 3) Goal difference; 4) Number of goals scored.

Final
18 and 25 October
Getxo	0	1	1
Alavés B	1	4	5

==== Final ====
18 October 2017	Getxo	0–1	Alavés B	Getxo
19:30				Stadium: Fadura

25 October 2017	Alavés B	4–1 (5–1 agg.)	Getxo	Vitoria-Gasteiz
19:00	Dani Iglesias 3' 77'; Víctor 68'; Fuentes 90'	Report	76'	Stadium: José Luis Compañón

=== Canary Islands tournament ===
Final
20 and 27 September
Tenerife B	1	2	3
Villa de Santa Brígida	0	2	2

==== Final ====
20 September 2017	Tenerife B	1–0	Villa de Santa Brígida	Santa Cruz de Tenerife
17:00	Giovanni 60' (pen.)	Report		Stadium: Centro Insular

27 September 2017	Villa de Santa Brígida	2–2 (2–3 agg.)	Tenerife B	Santa Brígida
17:00	Pablo Álvarez; Héctor Marrero	Report	Roberto Bolaños 58' (pen.); Giovanni 90'	Stadium: El Guiniguada

=== Cantabria tournament ===
Teams qualified between second and ninth place in 2016–17 Tercera División Group 3 registered for playing the competition. The bracket was drawn on 2 August. Quarter-finals and Semi-finals were played in Santa Cruz de Bezana.

Quarter-finals
12 August
Racing Santander B	7
Siete Villas	0
12 August
Tropezón	0
Escobedo	1
13 August
Laredo	1
Barreda	0
13 August
Cayón	3
Cultural Guarnizo	0

Semi-finals
15 August
Racing Santander B	1
Escobedo	3
15 August
Laredo	1 (3)
Cayón (p)	1 (4)

Final
28 September - Santander
Escobedo	3
Cayón	0

==== Final ====
28 September 2017	Escobedo	3–0	Cayón	Santander
20:30	Héctor Tirado 46'; Vitali 56'; Richi 70'	Report		Stadium: El Sardinero; Referee: León Lavín

=== Castile-La Mancha tournament ===
The Castile-La Mancha Football Federation announced the Copa Junta de Comunidades de Castilla La Mancha as the regional Copa RFEF qualifying tournament.

First round
29 July and 5 August
Manchego	0	2	2
Villarrubia	1	3	4
29 July and 5 August
Villarrobledo	1	2	3
La Roda	0	0	0
1 and 15 August
Azuqueca	2	2	4
Guadalajara	0	1	1
30 July and 2 August
Quintanar del Rey	2	2	4
Conquense	2	4	6

Semi-finals
23 and 30 August
Villarrubia	1	4	5
Villarrobledo	1	7	8
23 and 30 August
Azuqueca	3	0	3
Conquense (p)	0	3	3

Final
4 October
Villarrobledo	4
Conquense	1

==== Final ====
4 October 2017	Villarrobledo	4–1	Conquense	Villarrobledo
20:30	Asensio 6' 75'; Acevedo 41'; Cabezuelo 46'	Report	Adibe 62'	Stadium: N. Señora de la Caridad

=== Castile and León tournament ===
The Castile and León Football Federation made the draw of the tournament on 6 September 2017.

The semifinal between Ávila and Real Burgos was canceled by the regional Football Federation due to not having the seconds enough players for playing this tournament.

Semi-finals
14 and 21 September
Arandina	1	1	2
Burgos	1	2	3
14 and 21 September
Ávila (w.o.)
Real Burgos

Final
19 and 26 October
Burgos	2	1	3
Ávila	1	1	2

==== Final ====
19 October 2017	Burgos	2–1	Ávila	Burgos
20:00	Cusi 32'; Blázquez 60'	Report	Isma 76' (pen.)	Stadium: El Plantío

26 October 2017	Ávila	1–1 (2–3 agg.)	Burgos	Ávila
20:00	Mamadou 42'	Report	Sergio Esteban 68'	Stadium: Adolfo Suárez

=== Catalonia tournament ===
Three teams joined the regional tournament, consisted in a single-game knockout tournament.

Semi-final
20 September
Llagostera	1
Cornellà	2

Final
4 October
Cornellà	1
Vilafranca	2

==== Final ====
4 October 2017	Cornellà	1–2	Vilafranca	Cornellà
21:00	Sascha 6'	Report	Aday 55' 84'	Stadium: Nou Camp Municipal

=== Extremadura tournament ===
A record of 17 teams played the tournament, consisting in a single-game knockout tournament. The preliminary round and the round of 16 were firstly drawn, and later each round was drawn independently.

Preliminary round
30 July
Aceuchal	0
Extremadura B	1

Round of 16
6 August
Castuera	0
Azuaga	3
6 August
Diocesano	0
Arroyo	2
6 August
Olivenza	2
Jerez	0
6 August
Extremadura B	2
Amanecer	1
6 August
Santa Amalia	1
Valdivia	2
5 August
Atlético Pueblonuevo	2
Montijo	1
5 August
Trujillo	2
Moralo	1
6 August
Plasencia (p)	1 (4)
Coria	1 (3)

Quarter-finals
11 August
Azuaga	4
Arroyo	1
13 August
Olivenza	2
Extremadura B	1
13 August
Valdivia	1 (2)
Atlético Pueblonuevo (p)	1 (4)
13 August
Trujillo	1
Plasencia	2

Semi-finals
20 August
Azuaga	1
Olivenza	2
20 August
Atlético Pueblonuevo	0
Plasencia	1

Final
7 September – Miajadas
Olivenza	1
Plasencia	4

==== Final ====
7 September 2017	Olivenza	1–4	Plasencia	Miajadas
20:30	Chicote 48'	Report	Manu Moreira 34'; Aarón 50'; Luismi 70' (pen.) 72'	Stadium: Municipal; Attendance: 500

=== Galicia tournament ===
Eleven teams registered for playing the competition. The bracket was drawn on 13 July.

Teams were divided into two brackets according to geographical criteria and all matches were played at the stadium of the team that plays in a lower division. The federation paid €3,005 to the winner of the competition.

Qualifying round
26 July
Negreira	0
Bergantiños	1
26 July
Alondras (p)	1 (5)
Barbadás	1 (4)
26 July
Arosa	0
Céltiga	1

Quarter-finals
29 July
Bergantiños	0
Silva	2
30 July
Cerceda	2
Somozas	1
30 July
Alondras	2
Ribadumia	0
30 July
Céltiga	0 (1)
Coruxo (p)	0 (4)

Semi-finals
6 September
Silva	2
Cerceda	1
2 August
Alondras	4
Coruxo	1

Final
14 September – Santiago de Compostela
Silva	2
Alondras	1

==== Final ====
14 September 2017	Silva	2–1	Alondras	Santiago de Compostela
20:30	Jacobo 34'; Cardelle 86'	Report	Aitor Díaz 9'	Stadium: San Lázaro; Attendance: 200

=== La Rioja tournament ===
Seven teams will play the regional tournament, consisted in a single-game knockout tournament.

Quarter-finals
13 August
Náxara	1 (7)
SD Logroñés (p)	1 (8)
15 August
Anguiano	4
Agoncillo	2
13 August
UD Logroñés Promesas	5
Arnedo	0

Semi-finals
13 September
SD Logroñés	2
Varea	1
29 August
Anguiano (p)	1 (4)
UD Logroñés Promesas	1 (3)

Final
12 October
SD Logroñés	2
Anguiano	0

==== Final ====
12 October 2017	SD Logroñés	2–0	Anguiano	Logroño
17:00	Arpón 29'; Ledo 46'	Report		Stadium: Mundial 82; Attendance: 800

=== Madrid tournament ===
Final
20 September
San Sebastián de los Reyes	3
Alcobendas Sport	1

==== Final ====
20 September 2017	San Sebastián de los Reyes	3–1	Alcobendas Sport	San Sebastián de los Reyes
20:00	Maganto 15'; Álvaro Prada 31', 68'	Report	Roberto 17'	Stadium: Matapiñonera; Attendance: 350

=== Murcia tournament ===
First round
13 and 20 September
Churra	2	1	3
Murcia Imperial	4	3	7
13 and 20 September
Bala Azul	1	0	1
Águilas	0	4	4
14 and 20 September
Huércal-Overa	3	1	4
Lorca FC B	0	3	3
13 and 20 September
Minerva	1	1	2
Cartagena B	0	4	4

Semi-finals
27 September and 4 October
Murcia Imperial	1	4	5
Águilas	1	0	1
28 September and 5 October
Huércal-Overa	2	1	3
Cartagena B	3	1	4

Final
18 October – San Javier
Murcia Imperial	2
Cartagena B	3

==== Final ====
18 October 2017	Murcia Imperial	2–3	Cartagena B	San Javier
20:30	Gabri 54' 87' (pen.)	Report	Mario 8' 13'; Javi Inglés 90'	Stadium: Pitín; Attendance: 500

=== Navarre tournament ===
The competition was played in two stages: the first one as a group stage and the final as a single match. The groups were drawn on 5 July 2017.

==== Group 1 ====
Pos	Team	Pld	W	D	L	GF	GA	GD	Pts	Qualification	ARD	CIR	EGU
1	Ardoi	2	0	2	0	4	4	0	2	Qualification to the final	—	2–2	—
2	Atlético Cirbonero	2	0	2	0	2	2	0	2		—	—	0–0
3	Valle de Egüés	2	0	2	0	2	2	0	2		2–2	—	—

First match(es) will be played: 23 August 2017. Source:
Rules for classification: 1) Points; 2) Goal difference; 3) Number of goals scored; 4) Head-to-head results.

==== Group 2 ====
Pos	Team	Pld	W	D	L	GF	GA	GD	Pts	Qualification	TUD	IRU	ITA
1	Tudelano	2	2	0	0	7	1	+6	6	Qualification to the final	—	4–0	—
2	Iruña	2	1	0	1	1	4	−3	3		—	—	1–0
3	Itaroa Huarte	2	0	0	2	1	4	−3	0		1–3	—	—

Updated to match(es) played on 23 August 2017. Source:
Rules for classification: 1) Points; 2) Goal difference; 3) Number of goals scored; 4) Head-to-head results.

==== Final ====
30 August 2017	Ardoi	1–0 (a.e.t.)	Tudelano	Castejón
20:00	Madariaga 110'	Report		Stadium: Nuevo Tomillar

=== Valencian Community tournament ===
The competition will be played in three rounds, the first as a single match and semi-finals and final with home and away matches. The draw was on 11 August 2017.

First round
19 August
Novelda	0
Orihuela	2
23 August
Silla	0
Ontinyent	2
20 August
Roda	0
Torre Levante	1
20 August
Paiporta	2
Buñol	0

Semi-finals
30 August and 6 September
Orihuela	1	0	1
Ontinyent	0	3	3
30 August and 6 September
Torre Levante (a)	0	2	2
Paiporta	1	1	2

Final
4 and 18 October
Ontinyent	2	0	2
Torre Levante	0	1	1

==== Final ====
4 October 2017	Ontinyent	2–0	Torre Levante	Ontinyent
20:00	Juanan 41'; Tito Malagón 72'	Report		Stadium: El Clariano

18 October 2017	Torre Levante	1–0 (1–2 agg.)	Ontinyent	Valencia
17:00	Yagüe 65'	Report		Stadium: Orriols

== National tournament ==
The national tournament began 29 November 2017.

=== Qualified teams ===
Defending champion

(Valencian Community) Atlético Saguntino (3)

Teams losing Copa del Rey first round

(Andalusia) Arcos (4)
(Asturias) Avilés (4)
(Catalonia) ~~Badalona (3)~~
(Extremadura) ~~Cacereño (4)~~
(Cantabria) ~~Gimnástica Torrelavega (4)~~
~~Melilla (3)~~
(Valencian Community) Olímpic (4)
(Navarre) Peña Sport (3)
(Galicia (Spain)) **Pontevedra** (3)
(Cantabria) ~~Racing Santander (3)~~
(Galicia (Spain)) Rápido de Bouzas (3)
(Community of Madrid) Rayo Majadahonda (3)
(Basque Country (autonomous community)) ~~Real Unión (3)~~
(Aragon) Tarazona (4)
(Castilla–La Mancha) ~~Toledo (3)~~
(Region of Murcia) UCAM Murcia (3)
(Canary Islands) UD San Fernando (4)
(Extremadura) Villanovense (3)

Winners of Autonomous Communities tournaments

(Basque Country (autonomous community)) Alavés B (4)
(Navarre) Ardoi (4)
(Andalusia) Betis Deportivo (3)
(Castile and León) Burgos (3)
(Region of Murcia) Cartagena B (4)
(Cantabria) Escobedo (4)
(Andalusia) Huétor Tájar (4)
(Asturias) Langreo (4)
(Balearic Islands) Mallorca B (4)
(Valencian Community) Ontinyent (3)
(Extremadura) Plasencia (4)
(Community of Madrid) San Sebastián de los Reyes (3)
(La Rioja) SD Logroñés (4)
(Galicia (Spain)) Silva (4)
(Canary Islands) Tenerife B (4)
(Aragon) Utebo (4)
(Catalonia) Vilafranca (4)
(Castilla–La Mancha) Villarrobledo (4)

- (3) Team playing in 2017–18 Segunda División B (third tier)
- (4) Team playing in 2017–18 Tercera División (fourth tier)
- Slashed teams withdrew from the competition.
- Team in **bold** won the competition

=== Round of 32 ===
The draw for the first round was held on 31 October 2017. The matches were played between 29 November and 13 December 2017.

Team 1	Agg.	Team 2	1st leg	2nd leg
Avilés (4) (Asturias)	1–1 (a)	(Castile and León) **Burgos** (3)	1–1	0–0
Silva (4) (Galicia (Spain))	0–5	(Asturias) **Langreo** (4)	0–3	0–2
Rápido de Bouzas (3) (Galicia (Spain))	0–4	(Galicia (Spain)) **Pontevedra** (3)	0–1	0–3
Ardoi (4) (Navarre)	2–4	(Aragon) **Utebo** (4)	2–2	0–2
**Peña Sport** (3) (Navarre)	2–1	(Basque Country (autonomous community)) Alavés B (4)	0–1	2–0
Tarazona (4) (Aragon)	0–2	(La Rioja) **SD Logroñés** (4)	0–1	0–1
**Plasencia** (4) (Extremadura)	1–1 (4–3 p)	(Canary Islands) UD San Fernando (4)	1–0	0–1
**Villanovense** (3) (Extremadura)	7–3	(Canary Islands) Tenerife B (4)	4–0	3–3
**San Sebastián de los Reyes** (3) (Community of Madrid)	2–1	(Community of Madrid) Rayo Majadahonda (3)	1–1	1–0
Cartagena B (4) (Region of Murcia)	1–6	(Valencian Community) **Ontinyent** (3)	1–2	0–4
Olímpic (4) (Valencian Community)	1–8	(Region of Murcia) **UCAM Murcia** (3)	0–3	1–5
**Atlético Saguntino** (3) (Valencian Community)	3–1	(Balearic Islands) Mallorca B (4)	2–1	1–0
Arcos (4) (Andalusia)	2–5	(Andalusia) **Betis Deportivo** (3)	2–3	0–2
**Villarrobledo** (4) (Castilla–La Mancha)	6–2	(Andalusia) Huétor Tájar (4)	5–0	1–2

(Cantabria) Escobedo and (Catalonia) Vilafranca received a bye.

==== First leg ====
29 November 2017	**Cartagena B**	**1–2**	**Ontinyent**	Cartagena
16:00	Mario Solano 14' (pen.)	Report	Nemesio 10'; Bandera 33'	Stadium: Ciudad Jardín; Attendance: 200; Referee: Lozano Reina

29 November 2017	**Atlético Saguntino**	**2–1**	**Mallorca B**	Sagunto
19:00	Quesada 15', 48'	Report	Rodado 65'	Stadium: Camp Nou de Morvedre; Referee: Rodríguez Rodrigo

29 November 2017	**Silva**	**0–3**	**Langreo**	A Coruña
19:30		Report	Urcelay 31'; Fran No 69'; Polo 87'	Stadium: A Grela; Referee: Castro Alarcón

29 November 2017	**Peña Sport**	**0–1**	**Alavés B**	Tafalla
19:30		Report	Diéguez 45'	Stadium: San Francisco

29 November 2017	**Avilés**	**1–1**	**Burgos**	Avilés
20:00	Touré 72'	Report	Manzano 75'	Stadium: Román Suárez Puerta; Attendance: 110; Referee: Rodríguez García

29 November 2017	**Ardoi**	**2–2**	**Utebo**	Zizur Mayor
20:00	Iago 57'; Julen Madariaga 63'	Report	Bernad 23'; Rodrigo 31'	Stadium: El Pinar 1

29 November 2017	**San Sebastián de los Reyes**	**1–1**	**Rayo Majadahonda**	San Sebastián de los Reyes
20:00	Sergio Castel 53'	Report	Jorge Escobar 41'	Stadium: Nuevo Matapiñonera

29 November 2017	**Olímpic**	**0–3**	**UCAM Murcia**	Xàtiva
20:00		Report	Isi Ros 28'; David López 58', 73'	Stadium: La Murta

29 November 2017	**Arcos**	**2–3**	**Betis Deportivo**	Arcos de la Frontera
20:00	Maqui 5'; Legupín 37'	Report	Nieto 40' (pen.); Hinojosa 63'; Gracia 84'	Stadium: Antonio Barbadillo; Referee: Ferreras Macías

29 November 2017	**Tarazona**	**0–1**	**SD Logroñés**	Tarazona
20:15		Report	Peña 42'	Stadium: Municipal; Attendance: 200; Referee: Ramo Andrés

29 November 2017	**Rápido de Bouzas**	**0–1**	**Pontevedra**	Vigo
20:30		Report	Carlos Ramos 65' (pen.)	Stadium: Baltasar Pujales; Attendance: 200; Referee: Iglesias Melón

29 November 2017	**Plasencia**	**1–0**	**UD San Fernando**	Plasencia
20:30	Said Amine 40'	Report		Stadium: Municipal; Attendance: 300; Referee: Fuentes Pérez

29 November 2017	**Villanovense**	**4–0**	**Tenerife B**	Villanueva de la Serena
20:30	Espín 11'; Arroyo 40'; González 71'; Tapia 79'			Stadium: Romero Cuerda; Attendance: 600; Referee: Delfa Ramos

29 November 2017	**Villarrobledo**	**5–0**	**Huétor Tájar**	Villarrobledo
20:30	Minaya 28', 32'; Acevedo 56'; Yeber 71'; Piojo 90+1'	Report		Stadium: Nuestra Señora de la Caridad; Attendance: 100; Referee: Marchante Flores

==== Second leg ====
10 December 2017	Huétor Tájar	**2–1** (**2–6** agg.)	**Villarrobledo**	Huétor-Tájar
16:00	Gadea 37' (pen.); Alberto 90'	Report	Juanma Acevedo 43'	Stadium: Miguel Moranto

12 December 2017	**Langreo**	**2–0** (**5–0** agg.)	Silva	Langreo
19:30	Damián 45+4'; Polo 62'	Report		Stadium: Ganzábal; Attendance: 150; Referee: Romero García

13 December 2017	**Betis Deportivo**	**2–0** (**5–2** agg.)	Arcos	Seville
16:30	Hinojosa 3'; Rober 62'	Report		Stadium: Luis del Sol

13 December 2017	**UCAM Murcia**	**5–1** (**8–1** agg.)	Olímpic	Murcia
17:00	Isi Ros 6', 68'; Urko Arroyo 23'; Arturo 43', 55'	Report	Abengózar 26'	Stadium: La Condomina; Referee: Martínez Madrona

13 December 2017	Mallorca B	**0–1** (**1–3** agg.)	**Atlético Saguntino**	Palma
19:00		Report	Escudero 44'	Stadium: Son Bibiloni; Referee: Magí Bordoy

13 December 2017	Alavés B	**0–2** (**1–2** agg.)	**Peña Sport**	Vitoria
19:30		Report	Socorro 32'; Maeztu 49'	Stadium: José Luis Compañón

13 December 2017	**Burgos**	**0–0** (**1–1** agg.)	Avilés	Burgos
20:00		Report		Stadium: El Plantío; Attendance: 500; Referee: Cuesta Revilla

13 December 2017	**Utebo**	**2–0** (**4–2** agg.)	Ardoi	Utebo
20:00	79'; 83'			Stadium: Santa Ana

13 December 2017	Rayo Majadahonda	**0–1** (**1–2** agg.)	**San Sebastián de los Reyes**	Majadahonda
20:00		Report	Carlos Portero 40'	Stadium: Cerro del Espino; Attendance: 350; Referee: Pérez Hernández

13 December 2017	**Ontinyent**	**4–0** (**6–1** agg.)	Cartagena B	Ontinyent
20:00	Osoro 16'; Juanan 54', 87'; Fran Machado 71'	Report		Stadium: El Clariano; Referee: Rodríguez Carpallo

13 December 2017	**Pontevedra**	**3–0** (**4–0** agg.)	Rápido de Bouzas	Pontevedra
20:30	Jorge 15'; Lezcano 73', 90'	Report		Stadium: Pasarón; Attendance: 250; Referee: Villanueva Carballo

13 December 2017	**SD Logroñés**	**1–0** (**2–0** agg.)	Tarazona	Logroño
20:30	Imanol 90+3'	Report		Stadium: Las Gaunas; Attendance: 531; Referee: Andrés Martínez

13 December 2017	UD San Fernando	**1–0 (a.e.t.)** (**1–1** agg.) (**3–4** p)	**Plasencia**	Maspalomas
20:30	Maykel Santana 20'	Report		Stadium: Ciudad Deportiva; Referee: Mendoza Marrero

13 December 2017	Tenerife B	**3–3** (**3–7** agg.)	**Villanovense**	San Cristóbal de La Laguna
20:30		Report		Stadium: Ciudad Deportiva

=== Round of 16 ===
The draw for the round of 16 was held on 15 December 2017. The matches were played between 10 and 24 January 2018.

Team 1	Agg.	Team 2	1st leg	2nd leg
Langreo (4) (Asturias)	2–4	(Cantabria) **Escobedo** (4)	0–3	2–1
Burgos (3) (Castile and León)	3–3 (a)	(Galicia (Spain)) **Pontevedra** (3)	3–1	0–2
**Vilafranca** (4) (Catalonia)	6–2	(Navarre) Peña Sport (3)	3–0	3–2
**SD Logroñés** (4) (La Rioja)	5–3	(Aragon) Utebo (4)	2–2	3–1
**Betis Deportivo** (3) (Andalusia)	2–2 (a)	(Extremadura) Villanovense (3)	1–0	1–2
San Sebastián de los Reyes (3) (Community of Madrid)	2–3	(Extremadura) **Plasencia** (4)	2–2	0–1
UCAM Murcia (3) (Region of Murcia)	2–3	(Valencian Community) **Atlético Saguntino** (3)	1–2	1–1
Villarrobledo (4) (Castilla–La Mancha)	3–4	(Valencian Community) **Ontinyent** (3)	2–2	1–2

==== First leg ====
10 January 2018	**Betis Deportivo**	**1–0**	**Villanovense**	Seville
15:45	Loren 26'	Report		Stadium: Luis del Sol

10 January 2018	**UCAM Murcia**	**1–2**	**Atlético Saguntino**	Murcia
17:30	Urko Arroyo 18'	Report	David Fas 6'; Adrià Gallego 19'	Stadium: La Condomina; Referee: Ros Gómez

10 January 2018	**Vilafranca**	**3–0**	**Peña Sport**	Vilafranca del Penedès
19:30	Víctor Oribe 65', 89' (pen.); Aday 87'	Report		Stadium: Municipal; Attendance: 200; Referee: Carballo Vázquez

10 January 2018	**Langreo**	**0–3**	**Escobedo**	Langreo
20:00	Omar (penalty missed) 41'	Report	Dani 19', 30'; Marco 76'	Stadium: Ganzábal; Attendance: 300; Referee: Marinero Noval

10 January 2018	**Burgos**	**3–1**	**Pontevedra**	Burgos
20:00	Cusi 12', 39'; Carlos Álvarez 88' (pen.)	Report	Carlos Ramos 90+2'	Stadium: El Plantío; Attendance: 500; Referee: Calleja Castrillo

10 January 2018	**Villarrobledo**	**2–2**	**Ontinyent**	Villarrobledo
20:15	Raúl Calero 72'; Juanma Acevedo 86'	Report	David Bandera 29'; Leomar Pinto 90+3'	Stadium: Nuestra Señora de la Caridad; Referee: Rosado Montero

10 January 2018	**SD Logroñés**	**2–2**	**Utebo**	Logroño
20:30	Dani Suárez 28'; Liébana 73'	Report	Rodrigo 83', 89'	Stadium: Las Gaunas; Attendance: 530; Referee: De los Mozos

11 January 2018	**San Sebastián de los Reyes**	**2–2**	**Plasencia**	San Sebastián de los Reyes
20:00	Miguel Muñoz 5', 39'	Report	Karim 6', 51'	Stadium: Nuevo Matapiñonera; Attendance: 350; Referee: Sánchez Mateos

==== Second leg ====
24 January 2018	**Ontinyent**	**2–1** (**4–3** agg.)	Villarrobledo	Ontinyent
19:00	Javi Zarzo 30'; Álvaro Sánchez 46'	Report	Piojo 21'	Stadium: El Clariano; Referee: Tárraga Lajara

24 January 2018	Peña Sport	**2–3** (**2–6** agg.)	**Vilafranca**	Tafalla
19:30	Xabi Calvo 7'; Adrián Socorro 12' (pen.)	Report	Víctor Oribe 5', 75'; Aday 68'	Stadium: San Francisco; Attendance: 350; Referee: Álvarez Castillejo

24 January 2018	**Atlético Saguntino**	**1–1** (**3–2** agg.)	UCAM Murcia	Sagunto
19:30	Kata 1'	Report	Urko Arroyo 76'	Stadium: Camp Nou de Morvedre; Referee: García Gallegos

24 January 2018	**Escobedo**	**1–2** (**4–2** agg.)	Langreo	Escobedo, Camargo
20:00	Héctor Tirado 1'	Report	Polo 42'; Andrés Cabranes 66'	Stadium: Eusebio Arce; Attendance: 450; Referee: Zubillaga Serrano

24 January 2018	**Pontevedra**	**2–0** (**3–3** agg.)	Burgos	Pontevedra
20:00	Lezcano 31'; Álex González 46'	Report		Stadium: Pasarón; Attendance: 400; Referee: Gómez Lameiro

24 January 2018	Utebo	**1–3** (**3–5** agg.)	**SD Logroñés**	Utebo
20:00	Juan González 90+4'	Report	Guille 12' (o.g.); Óscar Liébana 88' (pen.); Rubén Peña 90+6'	Stadium: Santa Ana; Referee: Ferrer Collado

24 January 2018	**Plasencia**	**1–0** (**3–2** agg.)	San Sebastián de los Reyes	Plasencia
20:00	Cifu 81'	Report		Stadium: Municipal; Attendance: 500; Referee: Garro Sánchez

24 January 2018	Villanovense	**2–1** (**2–2** agg.)	**Betis Deportivo**	Villanueva de la Serena
20:30	Jacobo 2' (pen.); Dieguito 15'	Report	Iván Navarro 74'	Stadium: Romero Cuerda

=== Quarterfinals ===
The draw for the quarterfinals was held on 26 January 2018. Matches were played between 7 and 21 February 2018.

Team 1	Agg.	Team 2	1st leg	2nd leg
**Vilafranca** (4) (Catalonia)	2–2 (a)	(La Rioja) SD Logroñés (4)	1–0	1–2
**Pontevedra** (3) (Galicia (Spain))	1–1 (a)	(Cantabria) Escobedo (4)	0–0	1–1
Plasencia (4) (Extremadura)	1–2	(Valencian Community) **Atlético Saguntino** (3)	0–2	1–0
Betis Deportivo (3) (Andalusia)	2–3	(Valencian Community) **Ontinyent** (3)	2–0	0–3

==== First leg ====
7 February 2018	**Betis Deportivo**	**2–0**	**Ontinyent**	Seville
16:15	Aitor 52'; Abreu 57'	Report		Stadium: Luis del Sol; Referee: Quintero González

7 February 2018	**Pontevedra**	**0–0**	**Escobedo**	Pontevedra
20:00		Report		Stadium: Pasarón; Attendance: 400; Referee: Pastoriza Iglesias

7 February 2018	**Vilafranca**	**1–0**	**SD Logroñés**	Vilafranca del Penedès
20:00	Víctor Oribe 17'	Report		Stadium: Municipal; Attendance: 400; Referee: Sánchez Rico

7 February 2018	**Plasencia**	**0–2**	**Atlético Saguntino**	Plasencia
20:00		Report	Gimeno 10'; Escudero 49'	Stadium: Municipal; Attendance: 300; Referee: Gargantilla Fernández

==== Second leg ====
21 February 2018	**Atlético Saguntino**	**0–1** (**2–1** agg.)	Plasencia	Sagunto
19:00		Report	Durántez 66'	Stadium: Camp Nou de Morvedre

21 February 2018	**Ontinyent**	**3–0** (**3–2** agg.)	Betis Deportivo	Ontinyent
19:00	Javi Zarzo 32'; Ramón Verdú 78'; Álvaro Sánchez 81'	Report		Stadium: El Clariano

21 February 2018	SD Logroñés	**2–1** (**2–2** agg.)	**Vilafranca**	Logroño
20:00	Herce 45'; Naceur 80'	Report	Diego Jiménez 46' (o.g.)	Stadium: Las Gaunas; Attendance: 467; Referee: Acero Pradera

21 February 2018	Escobedo	**1–1** (**1–1** agg.)	**Pontevedra**	Escobedo, Camargo
20:00	Víctor 3'	Report	Éder 62'	Stadium: Eusebio Arce; Attendance: 650; Referee: Losada Feijoo

=== Semifinals ===
The draw for the semifinals was held on 23 February 2018. Matches were played between 7 and 14 March 2018.

Team 1	Agg.	Team 2	1st leg	2nd leg
**Pontevedra** (3) (Galicia (Spain))	3–2	(Valencian Community) Atlético Saguntino (3)	2–1	1–1
Vilafranca (4) (Catalonia)	1–3	(Valencian Community) **Ontinyent** (3)	1–1	0–2

==== First leg ====
7 March 2018	**Pontevedra**	**2–1**	**Atlético Saguntino**	Pontevedra
20:00	Lezcano 15'; Rivera 90+2'	Report	Granell 62'	Stadium: Pasarón; Attendance: 400; Referee: Lois Carro

7 March 2018	**Vilafranca**	**1–1**	**Ontinyent**	Vilafranca del Penedès
20:00	Víctor Oribe 58' (pen.)	Report	Álvaro Sánchez 39'	Stadium: Municipal; Attendance: 400; Referee: Martín Varas

==== Second leg ====
14 March 2018	Atlético Saguntino	**1–1** (**2–3** agg.)	**Pontevedra**	Sagunto
19:00	Álex Felip 88'	Report	Prosi 7'	Stadium: Camp Nou de Morvedre; Attendance: 1.500; Referee: Rallo Estévez

14 March 2018	**Ontinyent**	**2–0** (**3–1** agg.)	Vilafranca	Ontinyent
19:00	Álvaro Sánchez 25'; Machado 82'	Report		Stadium: El Clariano; Attendance: 900; Referee: Cánovas Villarrubia

=== Final ===
Final will be played between 4 and 11 April 2018.

Team 1	Agg.	Team 2	1st leg	2nd leg
Ontinyent (3) (Valencian Community)	0–1	(Galicia (Spain)) **Pontevedra** (3)	0–1	0–0

==== First leg ====
4 April 2018	**Ontinyent**	**0–1**	**Pontevedra**	Ontinyent
19:45		Report	Álex González 90+1'	Stadium: El Clariano; Attendance: 1.500; Referee: Sevilla Lérida

==== Second leg ====
11 April 2018	**Pontevedra**	**0–0** (**1–0** agg.)	Ontinyent	Pontevedra
20:00		Report		Stadium: Pasarón; Referee: Mallo Fernández
