= 2010–11 Copa Federación de España =

2010 – 11 Copa Federación de España
Tournament details
- Country: Spain
- Teams: 104

Final positions
- Champions: Puertollano
- Runner-up: Lemona

Tournament statistics
- Matches played: 209
- Goals scored: 557 (2.67 per match)

The 2010–11 Copa Federación de España was the 18th staging of the Copa Federación de España, a knockout competition for Spanish football clubs in Segunda División B and Tercera División.

The competition began on 4 August 2010 and ended with the finals on 31 March and 14 April 2011, where Puertollano became champion after defeating Lemona 4–3 on aggregate.

== Autonomous Communities tournaments ==
=== Andalusia tournament ===
==== Final ====
Team 1	Agg.	Team 2	1st leg	2nd leg
Ronda	(a) 2–2	Roquetas	0–1	2–1

=== Aragon tournament ===
==== Quarter-finals ====
Team 1	Agg.	Team 2	1st leg	2nd leg
Sabiñánigo	3–1	Villanueva	2–0	1–1
Valdefierro	0–3	Zaragoza B	0–2	0–1
La Muela	2–1	Monzón	1–0	1–1
Ejea	2–2(a)	Andorra	1–2	1–0

==== Semifinals ====
Team 1	Agg.	Team 2	1st leg	2nd leg
Andorra	4–4(a)	Zaragoza B	2–3	2–1
La Muela	2–1	Sabiñánigo	2–1	0–0

==== Final ====
Team 1	Agg.	Team 2	1st leg	2nd leg
Zaragoza B	4–3	La Muela	3–0	1–3

=== Asturias tournament ===
==== Qualifying tournament ====
===== Group A =====
Team	Pld	W	D	L	GF	GA	GD	Pts
Marino	4	3	0	1	10	2	+8	9
Ribadesella	4	2	1	1	4	7	–3	7
Condal	4	0	1	3	2	7	–5	1

===== Group B =====
Team	Pld	W	D	L	GF	GA	GD	Pts
Candás	4	2	2	0	8	5	+3	8
Sporting B	4	1	1	2	4	4	0	4
Navarro	4	1	1	2	4	7	–3	4

===== Group C =====
Team	Pld	W	D	L	GF	GA	GD	Pts
Langreo	4	3	1	0	7	2	+5	10
Universidad Oviedo	4	1	2	1	4	4	0	5
Real Avilés	4	0	1	3	3	8	–5	1

===== Group D =====
Team	Pld	W	D	L	GF	GA	GD	Pts
Lealtad	4	1	3	0	5	4	+1	6
Tuilla	4	1	2	1	4	4	0	5
Llanes	4	1	1	2	4	5	–1	4

==== Semifinals ====
Team 1	Agg.	Team 2	1st leg	2nd leg
Lealtad	1–3	Langreo	1–1	0–2
Marino	3–4	Candás	1–2	2–2

==== Final ====
Team 1	Score	Team 2
Candás	2–0	Langreo

=== Balearic Islands tournament ===
==== Semifinals ====
Team 1	Agg.	Team 2	1st leg	2nd leg
Ferriolense	1–7	Mallorca B	1–3	0–4
Binissalem	3–0	Constancia	3–0	0–0

==== Final ====
Team 1	Agg.	Team 2	1st leg	2nd leg
Mallorca B	5–2	Binissalem	2–1	3–1

=== Canary Islands tournament ===
==== First round ====
Team 1	Agg.	Team 2	1st leg	2nd leg
Atlético Granadilla	1–6	Marino	0–3	1–3
Orotava	2–5	Tenerife B	2–1	0–4

==== Semi-final ====
Team 1	Agg.	Team 2	1st leg	2nd leg
Marino	3–2	Tenerife B	2–0	1–2

==== Final ====
Team 1	Agg.	Team 2	1st leg	2nd leg
Mensajero	2–2 (1–4 p)	Marino	1–1	1–1

=== Cantabria tournament ===
==== First round ====
Team 1	Agg.	Team 2	1st leg	2nd leg
Cayón	3–0	Siete Villas	1–0	2–0
Gimn. Torrelavega	12–1	Solares	7–0	5–1
Racing B	4–2	Rayo Cantabria	2–1	2–1

==== Semifinals ====
Team 1	Agg.	Team 2	1st leg	2nd leg
Cayón	(a)3–3	Buelna	1–0	2–3
Gimn. Torrelavega	2–4	Racing B	2–0	0–4

==== Final ====
Team 1	Agg.	Team 2	1st leg	2nd leg
Cayón	1–2	Racing B	0–0	1–2

=== Castile and León tournament ===
Arandina was the only team inscribed in the competition, so it was considered the Regional champion.

=== Castile-La Mancha tournament ===
==== Semifinals ====
Team 1	Agg.	Team 2	1st leg	2nd leg
Almansa	4–2	Villarrobledo	2–1	2–1
Manzanares	5–0	Piedrabuena	1–0	4–0

==== Final ====
Team 1	Agg.	Team 2	1st leg	2nd leg
Manzanares	0–2	Almansa	0–0	0–2

=== Catalonia tournament ===
==== Final ====
Team 1	Agg.	Team 2	1st leg	2nd leg
Lleida	0–1	Sabadell	0–0	0–1

=== Euskadi tournament ===
==== Semifinals ====
Team 1	Agg.	Team 2	1st leg	2nd leg
Barakaldo	2–3	Lemona	1–2	1–1
Zalla	5–2	Aurrerá	1–1	4–1

==== Final ====
Team 1	Agg.	Team 2	1st leg	2nd leg
Lemona	5–3	Zalla	3–1	2–2

=== Extremadura tournament ===
==== First round ====
Team 1	Score	Team 2
Díter Zafra	2–2(4–3 p)	Villanovense
Plasencia	3–2	Ciudad Plasencia
Zurbarán	2–3	Don Benito
Burguillos	2–4	Jerez
Coria	3–6	Arroyo
Valverdeño	4–1	Cerro Reyes

==== Second round ====
Team 1	Score	Team 2
Plasencia	0–4	Arroyo
Valverdeño	0–2	Jerez

==== Semifinals ====
Team 1	Score	Team 2
Díter Zafra	1–1(3–4 p)	Don Benito
Jerez	0–0(7–6 p)	Arroyo

==== Final ====
Team 1	Score	Team 2
Don Benito	0–1	Jerez

=== Galicia tournament ===
==== First round ====
Team 1	Score	Team 2
Campus Stellae	0–2	Deportivo B
Ourense	0–0(4–5 p)	Coruxo

==== Semifinals ====
Team 1	Score	Team 2
Racing Ferrol	1–1(7–6 p)	Deportivo B
Montañeros	2–0	Coruxo

==== Final ====
Team 1	Score	Team 2
Racing Ferrol	2–2(0–3 p)	Montañeros

=== La Rioja tournament ===
==== Finals ====
Team	Pld	W	D	L	GF	GA	GD	Pts
Haro	2	2	0	0	4	0	+4	6
Calahorra	2	1	0	1	3	3	0	3
Alfaro	2	0	0	2	1	5	–4	0

=== Madrid tournament ===
==== Qualifying tournament ====
===== Group 1 =====
Team	Pld	W	D	L	GF	GA	GD	Pts
Rayo Vallecano B	6	5	1	0	12	6	+6	16
Internacional	6	3	1	2	12	8	+4	10
Colmenar Viejo	6	3	0	3	7	6	+1	9
Coslada	6	0	0	6	3	14	-11	0

===== Group 2 =====
Team	Pld	W	D	L	GF	GA	GD	Pts
Las Rozas	6	4	0	2	13	10	+3	12
Real Madrid C	6	2	2	2	11	8	+3	8
SS Reyes	6	2	1	3	12	13	-1	7
Atl. Pinto	6	2	1	3	8	13	-5	7

==== Final ====
Team 1	Score	Team 2
Las Rozas	1–1(7–6 p)	Rayo Vallecano B

=== Murcia tournament ===
==== First round ====
Team 1	Score	Team 2
Plus Ultra	1–0	Beniel
Fortuna	1–1(p)	Molina

==== Quarter-finals ====
Team 1	Score	Team 2
Molina	4–1	Plus Ultra
Pulpileño	0–2	Caravaca
La Hoya	1–0	Olímpico
Bala Azul	3–3(3–4 p)	Cartagena

==== Semifinals ====
Team 1	Score	Team 2
Caravaca	3–0	La Hoya
Molina	1–3	Cartagena

==== Final ====
Team 1	Score	Team 2
Cartagena	0–2	Caravaca

=== Navarre tournament ===
==== Final ====
Team 1	Agg.	Team 2	1st leg	2nd leg
Izarra	2–1	Oberena	1–1	1–0

=== Valencia tournament ===
==== Semifinal ====
Team 1	Agg.	Team 2	1st leg	2nd leg
Torrellano Illice	2–2(a)	Torrevieja	1–2	1–0

==== Final ====
Team 1	Agg.	Team 2	1st leg	2nd leg
Torrevieja	1–3	Crevillente	1–1	0–2

== National tournament ==
=== National Qualifying round ===
Team 1	Agg.	Team 2	1st leg	2nd leg
Corralejo (Canary Islands)	5–2	(Canary Islands) Marino	4–1	1–1
Burgos (Castile and León)	1–2	(Castile and León) Arandina	0–0	1–2

=== Round of 32 ===
Team 1	Agg.	Team 2	1st leg	2nd leg
Atlético Mancha Real (Andalusia)	1–5	(Andalusia) Ronda	0–3	1–2
Crevillente (Valencian Community)	1–1(4–2 p)	(Valencian Community) Gandía	1–0	0–1
Palencia (Castile and León)	2–1	(Navarre) Izarra	2–1	0–0
Alavés (Basque Country (autonomous community))	3–1	(Castile and León) Arandina	3–1	–
Noja (Cantabria)	3–4	(Cantabria) Racing B	3–3	0–1
Oyonesa (Basque Country (autonomous community))	1–5	(Aragon) Zaragoza B	0–1	1–4
Atlético Baleares (Balearic Islands)	1–1(a)	(Catalonia) Sabadell	1–1	0–0
Ontinyent (Valencian Community)	2–0	(Valencian Community) Dénia	2–0	0–0
Benidorm (Valencian Community)	(a)3–3	(Castilla–La Mancha) La Roda	1–1	2–2
Jerez (Extremadura)	3–2	(Andalusia) San Roque	1–0	2–2
Montañeros (Galicia (Spain))	3–2	(Asturias) Candás	3–1	0–1
Caravaca (Region of Murcia)	3–2	(Castilla–La Mancha) Almansa	3–1	0–1
Haro (La Rioja)	4–9	(Basque Country (autonomous community)) Lemona	2–2	2–7
Las Rozas (Community of Madrid)	1–1(a)	(Community of Madrid) Leganés	1–1	0–0
Parla (Community of Madrid)	1–3	(Castilla–La Mancha) Puertollano	0–0	1–3
Corralejo (Canary Islands)	2–5	(Balearic Islands) Mallorca B	2–3	0–2

=== Round of 16 ===
Team 1	Agg.	Team 2	1st leg	2nd leg
Lemona (Basque Country (autonomous community))	2–0	(Cantabria) Racing B	2–0	0–0
Sabadell (Catalonia)	3–3(a)	(Aragon) Zaragoza B	3–1	0–2
Crevillente (Valencian Community)	1–2	(Balearic Islands) Mallorca B	1–1	0–1
Caravaca (Region of Murcia)	3–2	(Extremadura) Jerez	3–2	0–0
Montañeros (Galicia (Spain))	1–4	(Castile and León) Palencia	0–2	1–2
Ronda (Andalusia)	2–3	(Castilla–La Mancha) Puertollano	1–1	1–2(aet)
Arandina (Castile and León)	1–1 (7–6 p)	(Community of Madrid) Leganés	1–0	0–1
Benidorm (Valencian Community)	1–3	(Valencian Community) Ontinyent	1–2	0–1

=== Quarterfinals ===
Team 1	Agg.	Team 2	1st leg	2nd leg
Palencia (Castile and León)	3–4	(Basque Country (autonomous community)) Lemona	2–3	1–1
Mallorca B (Balearic Islands)	3–6	(Region of Murcia) Caravaca	2–1	1–5
Arandina (Castile and León)	2–1	(Aragon) Zaragoza B	0–0	2–1
Puertollano (Castilla–La Mancha)	(a)2–2	(Valencian Community) Ontinyent	1–0	1–2

=== Semifinals ===
Team 1	Agg.	Team 2	1st leg	2nd leg
Caravaca (Region of Murcia)	2–2(3–5 p)	(Basque Country (autonomous community)) Lemona	2–0	0–2
Puertollano (Castilla–La Mancha)	3–1	(Castile and León) Arandina	1–0	2–1

=== Final ===
Team 1	Agg.	Team 2	1st leg	2nd leg
Puertollano (Castilla–La Mancha)	4–3	(Basque Country (autonomous community)) Lemona	0–2	4–1
