= CD Juvenia =

Spanish football team

Juvenia
- Full name: Club Deportivo Juvenia
- Founded: 1931
- Ground: Rafael García, Pozo Estrecho, Cartagena, Spain
- Capacity: 1,000
- Chairman: Rosa Maria Fernández Martínez
- Manager: Alberto Martínez
- League: Primera Autonómica – Group 1
- 2025–26: Primera Autonómica – Group 1, 6th of 16
Home colours	Away colours

Club Deportivo Juvenia is a football team based in Pozo Estrecho, Cartagena, Spain. Founded in 1931, the team plays in Primera Autonómica – Group 1. The club's home ground is Rafael García.

== History ==
Founded in 1931 as Juvenia Sociedad Deportiva, the club played one senior season in 1957–58, before only reestablishing a senior team in 1980, which also only lasted nine years. In 2002, the club returned to an active status, now named Club Deportivo Pozo Estrecho.

In June 2008, Pozo Estrecho achieved a first-ever promotion to Tercera División, thanks to the promotions of CA Ciudad de Lorquí, Real Murcia Imperial and Sangonera Atlético CF to Segunda División B. The club only lasted one season in the fourth tier, being relegated in the last round after losing to Mazarrón FC and seeing CD Lumbreras win their match.

In 2012, Pozo Estrecho retired from the Preferente Autonómica, and returned under the name of Club Deportivo Juvenia shortly after, in the Segunda Autonómica. After achieving an immediate promotion, the club fluctuated between the Preferente and the Primera Autonómica in the following seasons.

== Season to season ==
Season	Tier	Division	Place	Copa del Rey
1957–58	5	2ª Reg.	6th	
1958–1980	DNP			
1980–81	7	2ª Reg.	4th	
1981–82	7	2ª Reg.	8th	
1982–83	7	2ª Reg.	3rd	
1983–84	7	2ª Reg.	3rd	
1984–85	6	1ª Reg.	13th	
1985–86	6	1ª Reg.	9th	
1986–87	6	1ª Reg.	11th	
1987–88	6	1ª Reg.	10th	
1988–89	6	1ª Reg.	12th	
1989–2002	DNP			
2002–03	5	Terr. Pref.	16th	
2003–04	5	Terr. Pref.	10th	
2004–05	5	Terr. Pref.	9th	
2005–06	5	Terr. Pref.	14th	
2006–07	5	Terr. Pref.	12th	
2007–08	5	Terr. Pref.	5th	
2008–09	4	3ª	18th	
2009–10	5	Terr. Pref.	15th	

Season	Tier	Division	Place	Copa del Rey
2010–11	5	Pref. Aut.	7th	
2011–12	5	Pref. Aut.	15th	
2012–13	7	2ª Aut.	5th	
2013–14	6	1ª Aut.	9th	
2014–15	6	1ª Aut.	5th	
2015–16	5	Pref. Aut.	18th	
2016–17	6	1ª Aut.	1st	
2017–18	5	Pref. Aut.	12th	
2018–19	5	Pref. Aut.	16th	
2019–20	6	1ª Aut.	7th	
2020–21	5	Pref. Aut.	12th	
2021–22	6	Pref. Aut.	11th	
2022–23	7	1ª Aut.	11th	
2023–24	7	1ª Aut.	5th	
2024–25	7	1ª Aut.	5th	
2025–26	7	1ª Aut.	6th	
2026–27	7	1ª Aut.		

- 1 season in Tercera División
