= Emilio (footballer) =

Spanish footballer (born 1984)

Personal information
- Full name: Emilio José Romero Belluga
- Date of birth: 18 October 1984 (age 42)
- Place of birth: Albacete, Spain
- Height: 1.93 m (6 ft 4 in)
- Position: Goalkeeper

Team information
- Current team: Bala Azul

Senior career*
Years	Team	Apps	(Gls)
2003–2005	Real Murcia Imperial		
2003–2005	Real Murcia	1	(0)
2005–2006	Baza		
2006–2007	Villanovense	1	(0)
2007–2008	Alcoyano	0	(0)
2008–2009	Águilas	2	(0)
2009–2010	Sangonera Atlético		
2010–2012	Caravaca	38	(0)
2012–2013	Cultural Leonesa		
2013–2020	Orihuela		
2020	Europa	0	(0)
2020–2021	Mazarrón	25	(0)
2021–2022	Archena Sport	33	(0)
2022–2024	Racing Murcia	65	(0)
2024–	Bala Azul	6	(0)
- * Club domestic league appearances and goals as of 13 October 2024

Emilio José Romero Belluga (born 18 October 1984) is a Spanish footballer who plays as a goalkeeper for Bala Azul.

== Early life ==
Emilio is a native of Albacete, Spain.

== Club career ==
Emilio played for Spanish side Real Murcia in the Spanish second-tier Segunda División. After that, he signed for Spanish side Orihuela, where he was regarded as one of the club's most important players and a fan favorite. He has been regarded as one of the best goalkeepers in the region.

== International career ==
Emilio played for the Region of Murcia autonomous football team.

== Personal life ==
Emilio has a sister.
