= José Villanueva (footballer) =

Spanish footballer

Personal information
- Full name: José Antonio Villanueva Muñoz
- Date of birth: 16 August 1985 (age 41)
- Place of birth: Cartagena, Spain
- Height: 1.76 m (5 ft 9 1/2 in)
- Position: Winger

Youth career
- Ciudad Murcia
- 2003–2004: Elche

Senior career*
Years	Team	Apps	(Gls)
2002–2003	Cartagena	2	(0)
2004	Elche B	17	(14)
2004–2005	Bala Azul	28	(11)
2005–2006	Mazarrón	30	(14)
2006–2007	Las Palas	32	(17)
2007–2008	Puertollano	21	(0)
2008–2009	Pozo Estrecho	16	(5)
2009	Al Wasl	0	(0)
2009–2010	Ethnikos Achna	4	(0)
2010–2011	Orihuela	29	(2)
2012	Lorca Atlético	16	(0)
2012	COD Meknès		
2013	Torrevieja	10	(2)
2013–2014	Acireale	23	(5)
2014	Atlético Pulpileño	?	(1)
2014–2015	Pinatar	20	(1)
2015–2016	Lusitanos	8	(4)
2016–2018	Sant Julià	38	(16)
2018–2019	Lorca Deportiva	32	(8)
2019–2020	Cartagena	23	(2)
2020	Lorca		
2020–2021	Minerva	20	(1)
2021	Mazarrón	10	(1)
2022	Deportivo Minera	13	(0)
2022–2023	Muleño	10	(0)
2024–2025	Minerva	19	(2)
- * Club domestic league appearances and goals

José Antonio Villanueva Muñoz (born 16 August 1985) is a Spanish former footballer who played as a left winger.
