= Chema (footballer, born 1980) =

Spanish footballer

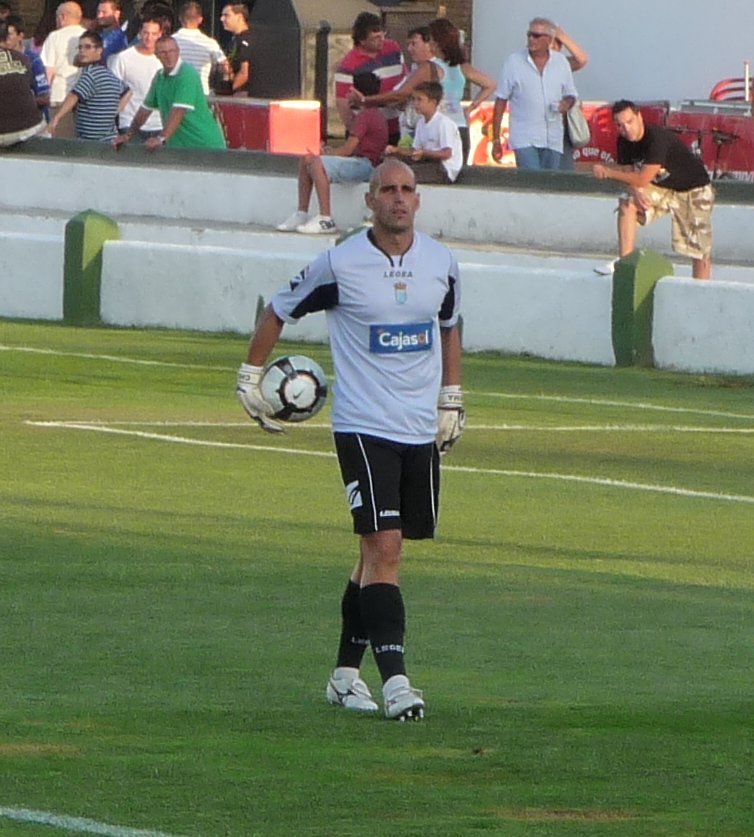
- Chema during a game with Xerez (2009)

Personal information
- Full name: José María Giménez Pérez
- Date of birth: 25 April 1980 (age 46)
- Place of birth: Orihuela, Spain
- Height: 1.87 m (6 ft 2 in)
- Position: Goalkeeper

Youth career
- 1990–1992: Escuela Orcelis
- 1992–1994: Orihuela
- 1994–1997: Bigastro
- 1997–1998: Beniel
- 1998–1999: Ranero

Senior career*
Years	Team	Apps	(Gls)
1999–2000	Balsicas		
2000–2001	Alquerías	37	(0)
2001–2002	Murcia B	25	(0)
2002–2006	Alicante	85	(0)
2006–2013	Xerez	127	(0)
2013–2014	Skoda Xanthi	17	(0)
2014–2017	Hércules	91	(0)
2017–2018	Eldense	40	(0)
2018–2020	Crevillente	65	(0)
Total		487	(0)
- * Club domestic league appearances and goals

José María Giménez Pérez (born 25 April 1980), known as Chema, is a Spanish former professional footballer who played as a goalkeeper.

He appeared in 125 Segunda División matches over six seasons, at the service of Xerez. He represented the same club in La Liga.

== Club career ==
Born in Orihuela, Alicante, Valencian Community, Chema started his career with amateur and modest clubs, moving in the 2006–07 campaign to Xerez CD in the Segunda División. A backup in his first two years (being second choice to French Stéphane Porato in his second season) he became an undisputed starter afterwards, playing 41 games as the Andalusia side reached the top flight for the first time ever.

In La Liga, Chema backed up Brazilian Renan, newly signed from Valencia CF, his first match only coming on 7 March 2010 in a 4–2 away win against neighbours Málaga CF. After retaining his post the following two games he suffered an injury, in an eventual immediate relegation as last.

In the summer of 2014, after one season in the Super League Greece with Skoda Xanthi FC, Chema returned to his homeland and signed for Hércules CF of Segunda División B. On 4 July 2017, the 37-year-old free agent moved down to the Tercera División and joined CD Eldense.

== Career statistics ==
Appearances and goals by club, season and competition
Club	Season	League			National cup		Europe		Other		Total	
Club	Season	Division	Apps	Goals	Apps	Goals	Apps	Goals	Apps	Goals	Apps	Goals
Alquerías	2000–01	Tercera División	37	0	—		—		—		37	0
Murcia B	2001–02	Tercera División	25	0	—		—		—		25	0
Alicante	2002–03	Segunda División B	1	0	0	0	—		—		1	0
Alicante	2003–04	Segunda División B	19	0	2	0	—		—		21	0
Alicante	2004–05	Segunda División B	30	0	0	0	—		—		30	0
Alicante	2005–06	Segunda División B	35	0	2	0	—		4	0	41	0
Alicante	Total		85	0	4	0	—		4	0	93	0
Xerez	2006–07	Segunda División	15	0	3	0	—		—		18	0
Xerez	2007–08	Segunda División	11	0	1	0	—		—		12	0
Xerez	2008–09	Segunda División	41	0	0	0	—		—		41	0
Xerez	2009–10	La Liga	3	0	2	0	—		—		5	0
Xerez	2010–11	Segunda División	32	0	2	0	—		—		34	0
Xerez	2011–12	Segunda División	5	0	0	0	—		—		5	0
Xerez	2012–13	Segunda División	20	0	1	0	—		—		21	0
Xerez	Total		127	0	9	0	—		—		136	0
Skoda Xanthi	2013–14	Super League Greece	17	0	0	0	1	0	—		18	0
Hércules	2014–15	Segunda División B	38	0	0	0	—		3	0	41	0
Hércules	2015–16	Segunda División B	33	0	1	0	—		6	0	40	0
Hércules	2016–17	Segunda División B	20	0	0	0	—		—		20	0
Hércules	Total		91	0	1	0	—		9	0	101	0
Eldense	2017–18	Tercera División	40	0	—		—		—		40	0
Crevillente	2018–19	Tercera División	38	0	—		—		—		38	0
Crevillente	2019–20	Tercera División	27	0	—		—		—		27	0
Crevillente	Total		65	0	—		—		—		65	0
Career total			487	0	14	0	1	0	13	0	515	0
