= Isi Ros =

Spanish footballer

Personal information
- Full name: Isidro Ros Ríos
- Date of birth: 6 November 1995 (age 31)
- Place of birth: Las Torres de Cotillas, Spain
- Height: 1.65 m (5 ft 5 in)
- Position: Winger

Team information
- Current team: Avilés
- Number: 22

Youth career
- 2005–2012: Cotillas
- 2012–2014: Plus Ultra
- 2014: → Elche (loan)

Senior career*
Years	Team	Apps	(Gls)
2013–2015	Plus Ultra	51	(19)
2013	→ Beniel (loan)	13	(1)
2015–2019	UCAM Murcia	83	(7)
2016	UCAM Murcia B	1	(0)
2017	→ Cartagena (loan)	17	(0)
2019–2020	Alcorcón	0	(0)
2019–2020	→ Recreativo (loan)	25	(3)
2020–2021	Badajoz	0	(0)
2021–2022	Atlético Baleares	8	(0)
2022	→ UCAM Murcia (loan)	12	(0)
2022–2023	Avilés	31	(7)
2023–2025	Águilas	44	(2)
2025–	Avilés	42	(4)
- * Club domestic league appearances and goals as of 9 June 2026

Isidro "Isi" Ros Ríos (born 6 November 1995) is a Spanish footballer who plays as a left winger for Primera Federación club Real Avilés.

== Club career ==
Born in Las Torres de Cotillas, Region of Murcia, Ros joined CD Plus Ultra's youth system from AD Cotillas CF. He made his senior debut in 2013, while on loan at CD Beniel.

In January 2014, Ros was loaned to Elche CF to finish his development. He returned to Plus Ultra in June, and scored a career-best 17 goals during the season of Tercera División.

Ros signed with UCAM Murcia CF in Segunda División B on 9 July 2015. He contributed 21 matches and one goal in his first year – playoffs included – as the club achieved promotion to Segunda División for the first time ever. He made his professional debut on 12 October 2016, coming on as a late substitute for Juan José Collantes in a 2–1 away win against RCD Mallorca in the third round of the Copa del Rey.

On 5 January 2017, Ros was loaned to third-tier FC Cartagena in a short-term deal. After being released by UCAM he continued competing at that level, with Recreativo de Huelva (on loan from AD Alcorcón), CD Badajoz (where he failed to make any appearances due to a left-knee injury) and CD Atlético Baleares.

== Personal life ==
Ros' father, also named Isidro, died in 2008 of a heart attack shortly before the start of a training session with Cotillas' youths. His 13-year-old son was part of the squad, and was present at the event.
