= Arturo Rodríguez (footballer, born 1989) =

Spanish footballer

Personal information
- Full name: Arturo Juan Rodríguez Pérez-Reverte
- Date of birth: 30 April 1989 (age 37)
- Place of birth: Cartagena, Spain
- Height: 1.88 m (6 ft 2 in)
- Position: Forward

Team information
- Current team: Mazarrón

Youth career
- Dolorense

Senior career*
Years	Team	Apps	(Gls)
2008–2009	Bala Azul	32	(5)
2009–2011	Cartagena B	66	(26)
2011–2012	La Unión	32	(11)
2012–2013	Getafe B	30	(9)
2013–2014	La Roda	19	(15)
2014–2016	Córdoba	21	(2)
2014–2015	→ Alcorcón (loan)	2	(0)
2015	→ Llagostera (loan)	17	(1)
2016	→ Dundee (loan)	3	(0)
2016–2017	Cartagena	38	(7)
2017–2018	UCAM Murcia	23	(3)
2018–2019	Sabadell	46	(10)
2019–2020	Atlético Baleares	21	(3)
2020–2023	San Sebastián	81	(17)
2023	Deportivo La Coruña	8	(0)
2023–2024	UCAM Murcia	31	(10)
2024–2025	Minera	24	(3)
2025–	Mazarrón	1	(0)
- * Club domestic league appearances and goals as of 28 September 2025

Arturo Juan Rodríguez Pérez-Reverte (born 30 April 1989) is a Spanish professional footballer who plays for Tercera Federación club Mazarrón as a forward.

== Club career ==
Born in Cartagena, Murcia, Arturo began playing as a senior with local CD Bala Azul in the 2008–09 season, in Tercera División. In 2009, he moved to FC Cartagena and was assigned to the reserves in the same category.

In July 2011 Arturo first arrived in Segunda División B, signing with newly formed CF La Unión, scoring 11 goals in the club's first and only season of existence. On 30 June of the following year, he agreed to a contract with another reserve team, Getafe CF B also in division three.

On 8 July 2013, Arturo joined fellow third tier side La Roda CF. On 30 December, he signed for Córdoba CF in Segunda División, after being the Castilian-Manchegan's topscorer with 15 goals in only 19 appearances.

Arturo made his professional debut on 4 January 2014, playing the last 21 minutes and scoring the last of a 2–0 home success over Recreativo de Huelva. He contributed with 19 appearances and two goals, as the Andalusians returned to La Liga after a 42-year absence.

On 15 July 2014 Arturo was loaned to AD Alcorcón, also in the second level. After appearing rarely, he terminated his loan on 7 January of the following year, and moved to fellow league team UE Llagostera hours later, also in a temporary deal.

On 20 January 2016, after spending the first half of the campaign with Córdoba, Arturo was loaned to Dundee until June; he totalled only five games for the Dees, all as a substitute. On 13 July, he returned to Cartagena, now for the main squad in the third level, after agreeing to a two-year contract.

Arturo subsequently spent the remainder of his career in the third division, representing UCAM Murcia CF, CE Sabadell FC, CD Atlético Baleares, San Sebastián and Deportivo La Coruña.

== Personal life ==
Arturo's uncle, Arturo Pérez-Reverte, is a novelist and member of the Royal Spanish Academy.
