= José Villanueva =

José Villanueva may refer to:

- José Villanueva (boxer) (1913–1983), Filipino boxer
- José Antonio Villanueva (born 1979), Spanish track cyclist
- José Luis Villanueva (born 1981), Chilean footballer
- José Villanueva (footballer) (born 1985), Spanish footballer
- José Luis Villanueva Orihuela (born 1964), Spanish racing cyclist

== See also ==
- San José Villanueva, municipality in El Salvador
