= Juan Ceballos =

Spanish professional footballer

Personal information
- Full name: Juan Carlos Ceballos Pinto
- Date of birth: 7 April 1983 (age 43)
- Place of birth: Barcelona, Spain
- Height: 1.78 m (5 ft 10 in)
- Position: Right back

Team information
- Current team: Minerva

Youth career
- Zona Franca
- Ferrán Martorell
- Espanyol

Senior career*
Years	Team	Apps	(Gls)
2001–2004	Espanyol B	89	(4)
2004–2005	Levante B	34	(1)
2005–2006	Levante	18	(0)
2006–2007	Ciudad Murcia	32	(0)
2007–2008	Racing Ferrol	37	(0)
2008–2010	Córdoba	29	(1)
2011–2012	Badalona	33	(1)
2012–2013	Cartagena	33	(0)
2013–2014	Cádiz	36	(0)
2014–2018	Cartagena	82	(1)
2018	Jumilla	18	(0)
2018–2019	Mar Menor	38	(0)
2019–	Minerva	26	(1)

International career
2001	Spain U17	4	(2)
2001–2002	Spain U19	4	(1)
2003	Spain U20	1	(0)
- * Club domestic league appearances and goals as of 7 March 2020

Juan Carlos Ceballos Pinto (born 7 April 1983) is a Spanish professional footballer who plays for SFC Minerva as a right back.

== Honours ==
Spain U19

- UEFA European Under-19 Championship: 2002

Spain U17

- Meridian Cup: 2001
