= Jero Miñarro =

Spanish footballer

Personal information
- Full name: Jerónimo Miñarro Navarro
- Date of birth: 19 September 1977 (age 49)
- Place of birth: Lorca, Spain
- Height: 1.84 m (6 ft 1/2 in)
- Position: Centre back

Youth career
- Valencia

Senior career*
Years	Team	Apps	(Gls)
1996–1998	Valencia B	49	(1)
1998–1999	Rayo Vallecano	2	(0)
1999–2000	Panachaiki	28	(3)
2000–2001	Getafe	16	(0)
2001	Burgos	3	(0)
2002	Zamora	5	(0)
2002–2003	Almería	0	(0)
2002–2003	Torredonjimeno	9	(0)
2003–2004	Sangonera Atlético		
2004–2005	Granada		
2005–2006	Burriana		
2006–2007	Calasparra		
2007	Ciudad Lorca		
2008	S.S. Reyes	14	(0)
2009	Lumbreras		
2009–2010	Lorca Deportiva		

International career
1992–1994	Spain U16	18	(0)
1995–1996	Spain U18	16	(0)
1997	Spain U20	1	(0)
- * Club domestic league appearances and goals

Jerónimo "Jero" Miñarro Navarro (born 19 September 1977) is a Spanish retired footballer who played as a central defender.

== Club career ==
Born in Lorca, Region of Murcia, Jero began his senior career with Valencia CF's reserves at the age of 19, never appearing officially for the first team. Subsequently, he moved to Segunda División and joined Rayo Vallecano, only playing twice during the season as the Madrid club promoted to La Liga.

In July 1999, Jero joined Super League Greece side Panachaiki FC, being first-choice during the campaign and scoring three goals as they narrowly avoided relegation. He returned to his country afterwards, appearing in only 19 second division games over the course of three seasons combined and being relegated with two of the three teams he represented in that level, Getafe CF and Burgos CF.

Jero's last appearance in the second tier would be in 2002–03 with UD Almería (no games played). Until his retirement in June 2010 at nearly 33, he played exclusively in the lower leagues, captaining Lorca Deportiva CF in his final year. Subsequently, he joined the technical staff of Segunda División B's AD Cerro de Reyes.

== International career ==
Jero played for Spain at various youth levels. He participated with the under-20s at the 1997 FIFA World Youth Championship in Malaysia, featuring in one match for the eventual quarter-finalists.
