= CD Alquerías =

Spanish football team (1992–2010)

Alquerías
- Full name: Club Deportivo Alquerías
- Founded: 1992
- Dissolved: 2010
- Ground: Los Pinos, Alquerías, Murcia, Spain
- Capacity: 500
| Home colours | Away colours |

Club Deportivo Alquerías was a Spanish football team based in Alquerías, in the autonomous community of Murcia. Founded in 1992 and dissolved in 2010, it held home games at Estadio Los Pinos which had a capacity of 500 spectators.

== History ==
From 1996 to 2002, Alquerías played in the fourth division. Its seventh and final season in the fourth tier was in 2007–08.

In the summer of 2010 the club folded, selling its place to the newly-formed Águilas FC.

== Season-by-season record ==
| Season | Tier | Division | Place | Copa del Rey |
|---|---|---|---|---|
| 1992–93 | 7 | 2ª Reg. | 16th | |
| 1993–94 | 7 | 2ª Reg. | 2nd | |
| 1994–95 | 6 | 1ª Reg. | 1st | |
| 1995–96 | 5 | Reg. Pref. | 3rd | |
| 1996–97 | 4 | 3ª | 7th | |
| 1997–98 | 4 | 3ª | 15th | |
| 1998–99 | 4 | 3ª | 14th | |
| 1999–2000 | 4 | 3ª | 13th | |
| 2000–01 | 4 | 3ª | 17th | |

| Season | Tier | Division | Place | Copa del Rey |
|---|---|---|---|---|
| 2001–02 | 4 | 3ª | 20th | |
| 2002–03 | 5 | Terr. Pref. | 17th | |
| 2003–04 | 5 | Terr. Pref. | 13th | |
| 2004–05 | 5 | Terr. Pref. | 15th | |
| 2005–06 | 5 | Terr. Pref. | 9th | |
| 2006–07 | 5 | Terr. Pref. | 7th | |
| 2007–08 | 4 | 3ª | 19th | |
| 2008–09 | 5 | Terr. Pref. | 16th | |
| 2009–10 | 5 | Terr. Pref. | 12th | |

- 7 seasons in Tercera División
