= Club Olímpico de Totana =

Association football club in Spain

Olímpico de Totana
- Full name: Club Olímpico de Totana
- Founded: 1961
- Ground: Juan Cayuela, Totana, Region of Murcia, Spain
- Capacity: 2,500
- Chairman: (Spain) Sebastian Periago Perellon
- Manager: (Spain) Antonio Calatayud Lax
- League: Tercera Federación – Group 13
- 2025–26: Tercera Federación – Group 13, 4th of 18
Home colours	Away colours	Third colours

Club Olímpico de Totana is a Spanish football team from Totana, Murcia. It was founded in 1961. The team currently plays in the Tercera Federación – Group 13.

== History ==
Founded in 1961. In the 1980-1981 season, they debuted in Tercera División.

== Season to season ==
Season	Tier	Division	Place	Copa del Rey
1962–63	5	2ª Reg.	1st	
1963–64	4	1ª Reg.	9th	
1964–65	4	1ª Reg.	5th	
1965–66	4	1ª Reg.	5th	
1966–67	4	1ª Reg.	6th	
1967–68	4	1ª Reg.	9th	
1968–69	4	1ª Reg.	3rd	
1969–70	4	1ª Reg.	4th	
1970–71	4	1ª Reg.	16th	
1971–72	4	Reg. Pref.	19th	
1972–73	5	1ª Reg.	5th	
1973–74	5	1ª Reg.	2nd	
1974–75	4	Reg. Pref.	13th	
1975–76	5	1ª Reg.	3rd	
1976–77	4	Reg. Pref.	10th	
1977–78	5	Reg. Pref.	9th	
1978–79	5	Reg. Pref.	10th	
1979–80	5	Reg. Pref.	2nd	
1980–81	4	3ª	7th	
1981–82	4	3ª	12th	

Season	Tier	Division	Place	Copa del Rey
1982–83	4	3ª	16th	
1983–84	4	3ª	13th	
1984–85	4	3ª	12th	
1985–86	4	3ª	18th	
1986–87	5	Reg. Pref.	5th	
1987–88	4	3ª	11th	
1988–89	4	3ª	3rd	
1989–90	4	3ª	7th	
1990–91	4	3ª	15th	First round
1991–92	4	3ª	17th	
1992–93	5	Reg. Pref.	5th	
1993–94	5	Reg. Pref.	1st	
1994–95	4	3ª	14th	
1995–96	4	3ª	16th	
1996–97	4	3ª	11th	
1997–98	4	3ª	8th	
1998–99	4	3ª	5th	
1999–2000	4	3ª	1st	
2000–01	4	3ª	18th	First round
2001–02	5	Terr. Pref.	5th	

Season	Tier	Division	Place	Copa del Rey
2002–03	4	3ª	20th	
2003–04	5	Terr. Pref.	5th	
2004–05	5	Terr. Pref.	6th	
2005–06	5	Terr. Pref.	3rd	
2006–07	4	3ª	13th	
2007–08	4	3ª	18th	
2008–09	5	Terr. Pref.	11th	
2009–10	5	Terr. Pref.	18th	
2010–11	6	1ª Aut.	2nd	
2011–12	5	Pref. Aut.	5th	
2012–13	4	3ª	13th	
2013–14	4	3ª	19th	
2016–17	4	3ª	20th	
2017–18	5	Pref. Aut.	2nd	
2018–19	4	3ª	11th	
2019–20	4	3ª	18th	
2020–21	4	3ª	7th / 6th	
2021–22	6	Pref. Aut.	6th	

Season	Tier	Division	Place	Copa del Rey
2022–23	6	Pref. Aut.	10th	
2023–24	6	Pref. Aut.	11th	
2024–25	6	Pref. Aut.	2nd	
2025–26	5	3ª Fed.	4th	
2026–27	5	3ª Fed.		

- 27 seasons in Tercera División
- 2 seasons in Tercera Federación

== Honours ==
- Tercera División

Winners (1): 1999–2000
