= Estudiantes de Murcia CF =

Estudiantes de Murcia
- Full name: Nueva Vanguardia Estudiantes de Murcia Club de Fútbol
- Founded: 2016
- Dissolved: 2019; 7 years ago
- Ground: Ángel Sornichero, Alcantarilla, Murcia, Spain
- Capacity: 400
- President: José María Monteagudo
- Head coach: Alberto Castillo
- 2018–19: 3ª – Group 13, 20th
Home colours	Away colours

Nueva Vanguardia Estudiantes de Murcia Club de Fútbol, known as Estudiantes de Murcia, was a Spanish football club based in Murcia. Founded in 2016, it was the reserve team of FC Jumilla, and last played in Tercera División – Group 13, holding home games at Polideportivo Municipal Ángel Sornichero in Alcantarilla, with a capacity of 400 spectators.

== History ==
Estudiantes' origins trace back to 1964 with the foundation of Nueva Vanguardia CF (a club mainly dedicated to the youth categories), which merged with Espinardo Atlético (founded in 2013 and playing that season under the name of Sporting de Murcia CF) in August 2015, to become CF Espinardo Atlético Nueva Vanguardia. Both clubs also absorbed Club Edeco PMD Fortuna, taking their place in Tercera División.

In July 2016, the club became FC Jumilla's reserve team, being renamed Nueva Vanguardia Estudiantes de Murcia Club de Fútbol. In the following year, the club changed name to Estudiantes CF and ended their partnership with Jumilla, but as the agreement was reinstated in June 2018, the club changed back to its previous name.

In August 2019, after Jumilla were dissolved, Estudiantes de Murcia also folded.

== Club background ==
Espinardo Atlético - (2013–2015) → ↓

Club de Fútbol Espinardo Atlético Nueva Vanguardia - (2015–2016) →↓

Nueva Vanguardia Estudiantes de Murcia Club de Fútbol - (2016–present)

Club de Fútbol Nueva Vanguardia - (1964–2015) → ↑

Club Edeco PMD Fortuna - (1987–2015) → ↑

== Season to season ==
=== CF Nueva Vanguardia ===
Season	Tier	Division	Place	Copa del Rey
1992–93	5	Reg. Pref.	16th	
1993–94	5	Reg. Pref.	14th	
1994–95	5	Reg. Pref.	17th	
1995–2002	DNP			
2002–03	6	1ª Terr.	2nd	
2003–04	5	Terr. Pref.	14th	
2004–05	5	Terr. Pref.	13th	
2005–06	5	Terr. Pref.	8th	
2006–07	5	Terr. Pref.	20th	
2007–08	6	1ª Terr.	5th	

=== Edeco PMD Fortuna ===
Season	Tier	Division	Place	Copa del Rey
1999–2000	5	Terr. Pref.	9th	
2000–01	6	1ª Terr.	12th	
2001–02	6	1ª Terr.	9th	
2002–03	6	1ª Terr.	6th	
2003–04	5	Terr. Pref.	17th	
2004–05	5	Terr. Pref.	16th	
2005–06	5	Terr. Pref.	11th	
2006–07	5	Terr. Pref.	8th	

Season	Tier	Division	Place	Copa del Rey
2007–08	5	Terr. Pref.	8th	
2008–09	5	Terr. Pref.	2nd	
2009–10	4	3ª	12th	
2010–11	4	3ª	11th	
2011–12	4	3ª	14th	
2012–13	4	3ª	15th	
2013–14	4	3ª	14th	
2014–15	4	3ª	14th	

- 6 seasons in Tercera División

=== Espinardo Atlético ===
Season	Tier	Division	Place	Copa del Rey
2013–14	7	2ª Aut.	7th	
2014–15	6	1ª Aut.	9th	
2015–16	4	3ª	11th	

- 1 season in Tercera División

=== Estudiantes de Murcia CF ===
- As FC Jumilla's reserve team

Season	Tier	Division	Place
2016–17	4	3ª	9th
2018–19	4	3ª	20th

- As an independent club

Season	Tier	Division	Place	Copa del Rey
2017–18	4	3ª	9th	
2018–19	4	3ª	20th	

- 4 seasons in Tercera División
