= Huércal-Overa CF =

Association football club in Spain

Huércal-Overa
- Full name: Huércal-Overa Club de Fútbol
- Founded: 2008
- Ground: El Hornillo; Huércal-Overa, Almería, Spain
- Capacity: 2,000
- Chairman: (Spain) Salvador Parra Molina
- Manager: (Spain) Sebastián López Gómez
- League: Primera Autonómica – Group 1
- 2024–25: Segunda Autonómica – Group 1, 5th of 12 (promoted)
Home colours	Away colours

Huércal-Overa Club de Fútbol is a Spanish football club based in Huércal-Overa, Andalusia, but play in the Region of Murcia. They play in Primera Autonómica – Group 1, holding home games at El Hornillo, with a capacity of 2,000 (785 seated).

== History ==
The first club in the city of Huércal-Overa was founded in 1913. On 1 July 1944, Club de Fútbol Huercalense was founded, and managed to play in five Tercera División seasons before selling their seat to CD Ciudad de Vícar in 2007.

In 2008, a new club named Club de Fútbol El Castillo was founded in the city, but being registered to play in the Football Federation of the Region of Murcia. In 2012, the club reached the fourth tier after achieving three consecutive promotions, and changed name to Huércal-Overa Club de Fútbol in 2014.

In 2022, after suffering relegation, Huércal-Overa spent one year without an active senior team.

== Season to season ==
Season	Tier	Division	Place	Copa del Rey
2008–09	7	1ª Terr.	12th	
2009–10	7	1ª Terr.	3rd	
2010–11	6	1ª Aut.	1st	
2011–12	5	Pref. Aut.	3rd	
2012–13	4	3ª	14th	
2013–14	4	3ª	7th	
2014–15	4	3ª	3rd	
2015–16	4	3ª	7th	
2016–17	4	3ª	14th	
2017–18	4	3ª	14th	
2018–19	4	3ª	16th	
2019–20	4	3ª	15th	
2020–21	4	3ª	8th / 4th	
2021–22	5	3ª RFEF	17th	
2022–23	DNP			
2023–24	8	2ª Aut.	5th	
2024–25	8	2ª Aut.	5th	
2025–26	7	1ª Aut.		

- 9 seasons in Tercera División
- 1 season in Tercera División RFEF
