= 1998–99 Tercera División =

Tercera División
- Season: 1998–99

The 1998–99 Tercera División season is the 22nd season since establishment the tier four.

== League table ==
=== Group 1 ===
Pos	Team	Pld	W	D	L	GF	GA	GD	Pts	Qualification or relegation
1	Porriño	38	19	13	6	55	34	+21	70	Promotion play-offs
2	Celta B	38	20	7	11	61	36	+25	67	Promotion play-offs
3	Cerceda	38	19	10	9	52	35	+17	67	Promotion play-offs
4	Viveiro	38	16	16	6	52	39	+13	64	Promotion play-offs
5	Xove Lago	38	17	12	9	46	31	+15	63	
6	Compostela B	38	16	14	8	49	41	+8	62	
7	Ponte Ourense	38	16	13	9	58	41	+17	61	
8	Gondomar	38	18	5	15	56	43	+13	59	
9	Endesa As Pontes	38	16	11	11	41	34	+7	59	
10	Arosa	38	16	10	12	43	44	−1	58	
11	Ourense B	38	16	8	14	70	61	+9	56	
12	Lemos	38	12	14	12	40	39	+1	50	
13	Betanzos	38	12	13	13	52	50	+2	49	
14	Alondras	38	12	9	17	44	54	−10	45	
15	Villalonga	38	13	5	20	57	67	−10	44	
16	Caselas (Note: Relegated due to the relegations of regional teams from Segunda División B.) (R)	38	13	5	20	56	63	−7	44 (Note: Vilallonga finished ahead of Caselas on head-to-head points: Vilallonga–Caselas 1–1, Caselas–Vilallonga 3–4)	Relegation
17	Atlético Arteixo (Note: Relegated due to the relegations of regional teams from Segunda División B.) (R)	38	8	11	19	37	56	−19	35	Relegation
18	Gran Peña (R)	38	7	10	21	42	75	−33	31	Relegation
19	Sanxenxo (R)	38	7	8	23	28	58	−30	29	Relegation
20	Somozas (R)	38	7	6	25	35	73	−38	27	Relegation

Source: Fútbol Regional
(R) Relegated

=== Group 2 ===
Pos	Team	Pld	W	D	L	GF	GA	GD	Pts	Qualification or relegation
1	Marino de Luanco	38	23	7	8	72	30	+42	76	Promotion play-offs
2	Siero	38	19	10	9	60	35	+25	67	Promotion play-offs
3	Navia	38	19	8	11	70	51	+19	65	Promotion play-offs
4	Real Titánico	38	18	10	10	63	47	+16	64	Promotion play-offs
5	San Martín	38	17	12	9	53	31	+22	63	
6	Tuilla	38	15	14	9	63	43	+20	59	
7	Universidad de Oviedo	38	16	10	12	56	43	+13	58	
8	Navarro	38	16	9	13	62	62	0	57	
9	Colloto	38	14	13	11	43	42	+1	55	
10	Ribadesella	38	13	10	15	42	44	−2	49	
11	Andés	38	12	12	14	35	49	−14	48	
12	Narcea	38	11	14	13	38	41	−3	47	
13	Gijón Industrial	38	13	8	17	49	58	−9	47	
14	Mosconia	38	12	10	16	33	45	−12	46	
15	Deportiva Piloñesa	38	12	10	16	46	61	−15	46	
16	Europa de Nava (Note: Relegated due to the relegations of regional teams from Segunda División B.) (R)	38	10	12	16	34	42	−8	42	Relegation
17	Candás (Note: Relegated due to the relegations of regional teams from Segunda División B.) (R)	38	10	11	17	25	43	−18	41	Relegation
18	Covadonga (R)	38	9	14	15	52	69	−17	41	Relegation
19	Pumarín (R)	38	7	11	20	33	64	−31	32	Relegation
20	Trasona (R)	38	8	7	23	40	69	−29	31	Relegation

Source: Fútbol Regional
(R) Relegated

=== Group 3 ===
Pos	Team	Pld	W	D	L	GF	GA	GD	Pts	Qualification or relegation
1	Racing B	38	27	10	1	64	15	+49	91	Promotion play-offs
2	Escobedo	38	24	5	9	67	30	+37	77	Promotion play-offs
3	Ribamontán al Mar	38	20	11	7	51	26	+25	71	Promotion play-offs
4	Bezana	38	21	7	10	50	31	+19	70	Promotion play-offs
5	Santoña	38	21	5	12	52	42	+10	68	
6	Cayón	38	16	9	13	33	40	−7	57	
7	Barreda	38	13	12	13	54	47	+7	51	
8	Textil Escudo	38	13	12	13	33	32	+1	51	
9	Naval	38	11	16	11	32	33	−1	49	
10	Revilla	38	13	9	16	31	40	−9	48	
11	Laredo	38	12	9	17	36	40	−4	45	
12	Guarnizo	38	10	15	13	42	48	−6	45	
13	Velarde	38	11	11	16	32	47	−15	44	
14	Comillas	38	10	13	15	43	55	−12	43	
15	Miengo	38	10	13	15	35	35	0	43	
16	Castro (Note: Relegated due to the relegations of regional teams from Segunda División B.) (R)	38	10	12	16	44	49	−5	42	Relegation
17	Unión Club Astillero (Note: Relegated due to the relegations of regional teams from Segunda División B.) (R)	38	11	8	19	38	66	−28	41	Relegation
18	Villaescusa (R)	38	9	12	17	31	42	−11	39	Relegation
19	Ayrón (R)	38	9	10	19	32	48	−16	37	Relegation
20	Pontejos (R)	38	7	5	26	37	71	−34	26	Relegation

Source: Fútbol Regional
(R) Relegated

=== Group 4 ===
Pos	Team	Pld	W	D	L	GF	GA	GD	Pts	Qualification or relegation
1	Real Sociedad B	38	28	5	5	99	42	+57	89	Promotion play-offs
2	Alavés B	38	20	11	7	77	40	+37	71	Promotion play-offs
3	Real Unión	38	18	12	8	60	29	+31	66	Promotion play-offs
4	Zalla	38	17	13	8	62	37	+25	64	Promotion play-offs
5	Hernani	38	17	11	10	45	37	+8	62	
6	Durango	38	15	15	8	44	37	+7	60	
7	Basconia	38	14	15	9	50	42	+8	57	
8	Arenas de Getxo	38	12	17	9	44	42	+2	53	
9	San Pedro	38	13	13	12	37	39	−2	52	
10	Aurrerá de Ondarroa	38	10	17	11	40	41	−1	47	
11	Lagun Onak	38	11	13	14	44	49	−5	46	
12	Sodupe	38	12	10	16	51	60	−9	46	
13	Eibar B	38	10	16	12	47	47	0	46	
14	Amorebieta	38	10	14	14	35	39	−4	44	
15	Tolosa	38	11	9	18	45	49	−4	42	
16	Universidad del País Vasco-EHU	38	10	11	17	38	58	−20	41	
17	Santurtzi	38	9	14	15	34	47	−13	41	
18	Touring (R)	38	7	14	17	44	79	−35	35	Relegation
19	Zamudio (R)	38	8	8	22	39	68	−29	32	Relegation
20	Alegría (R)	38	4	10	24	38	91	−53	22	Relegation

Source: Fútbol Regional
(R) Relegated

=== Group 5 ===
Pos	Team	Pld	W	D	L	GF	GA	GD	Pts	Qualification or relegation
1	Manlleu	38	20	10	8	56	38	+18	70	Promotion play-offs
2	Premià	38	21	7	10	75	39	+36	70	Promotion play-offs
3	Europa	38	19	9	10	62	45	+17	66 (Note: Europa finished ahead of Mataró and Balaguer on head-to-head points: Europa–Mataró 1–0, Mataró–Europa 1–0; Europa-Balaguer 2-1, Balaguer-Europa 0-3)	Promotion play-offs
4	Mataró	38	17	15	6	69	46	+23	66 (Note: Mataró finished ahead of Balaguer on head-to-head points: Mataró–Balaguer 5–2, Balaguer–Mataró 0–0)	Promotion play-offs
5	Balaguer	38	19	9	10	76	54	+22	66	
6	Badaloní	38	17	14	7	64	48	+16	65	
7	Tàrrega	38	18	10	10	55	43	+12	64	
8	Horta	38	17	10	11	59	54	+5	61	
9	Barcelona C	38	18	6	14	75	53	+22	60	
10	Banyoles	38	16	9	13	60	61	−1	57	
11	Tortosa	38	15	10	13	60	56	+4	55	
12	Reus	38	15	9	14	50	52	−2	54	
13	Badalona	38	13	13	12	35	34	+1	52	
14	Vilassar de Mar (Note: Relegated due to the relegation of Espanyol B from Segunda División B.) (R)	38	13	10	15	48	51	−3	49	Relegation
15	Vilobí	38	13	9	16	63	64	−1	48	
16	Vic	38	8	8	22	35	62	−27	32	
17	Andorra (Note: Relegated due to the relegations of regional teams from Segunda División B.) (R)	38	7	9	22	35	72	−37	30	Relegation
18	Santboià (R)	38	8	5	25	51	71	−20	29	Relegation
19	Sant Andreu (R)	38	6	9	23	30	68	−38	27	Relegation
20	Vilafranca (R)	38	3	13	22	29	76	−47	22	Relegation

Source: Fútbol Regional
(R) Relegated

=== Group 6 ===
Pos	Team	Pld	W	D	L	GF	GA	GD	Pts	Qualification or relegation
1	Elche B	38	20	11	7	55	28	+27	71	Promotion play-offs
2	Novelda	38	18	13	7	52	32	+20	67	Promotion play-offs
3	Alcoyano	38	17	14	7	33	21	+12	65	Promotion play-offs
4	Alzira	38	17	12	9	53	33	+20	63 (Note: Alzira finished ahead of Pego on head-to-head points: Pego–Alzira 0–0, Alzira–Pego 1–0)	Promotion play-offs
5	Pego	38	15	18	5	37	21	+16	63	
6	Burriana	38	16	11	11	56	31	+25	59	
7	Burjassot	38	15	12	11	40	32	+8	57	
8	Pinoso	38	14	14	10	38	33	+5	56	
9	Onda	38	15	8	15	49	52	−3	53 (Note: Onda finished ahead of Eldense on head-to-head points: Onda–Eldense 0–0, Eldense–Onda 1–2)	
10	Eldense	38	14	11	13	54	43	+11	53	
11	Foios	38	14	9	15	38	37	+1	51 (Note: Foios finished ahead of Gimnástico on head-to-head points: Gimnástico–Foios 0–0, Foios–Gimnástico 3–1)	
12	Gimnástico	38	13	12	13	34	36	−2	51	
13	Dénia	38	9	17	12	41	42	−1	44	
14	Olímpic de Xàtiva	38	11	8	19	43	60	−17	41	
15	Vall de Uxó	38	10	10	18	31	47	−16	40	
16	San Marcelino	38	9	12	17	39	68	−29	39 (Note: San Marcelino finished ahead of Santa Pola and Sueca on head-to-head points: Santa Pola–San Marcelino 1–2, San Marcelino–Santa Pola 4–1; San Marcelino–Sueca 2-1, Sueca–San Marcelino 0–0; Santa Pola–Sueca 1–0, Sueca–Santa Pola 0–0)	
17	Santa Pola	38	10	9	19	30	54	−24	39	
18	Sueca (R)	38	9	12	17	29	43	−14	39	Relegation
19	Utiel (R)	38	9	9	20	34	61	−27	36	Relegation
20	Torrevieja (R)	38	7	14	17	42	54	−12	35	Relegation

Source: Fútbol Regional
(R) Relegated

=== Group 7 ===
Pos	Team	Pld	W	D	L	GF	GA	GD	Pts	Qualification or relegation
1	Real Madrid C	40	25	8	7	88	45	+43	83	Promotion play-offs
2	Leganés B	40	23	7	10	57	29	+28	76	Promotion play-offs
3	Coslada	40	19	12	9	48	34	+14	69	Promotion play-offs
4	Amorós	40	21	5	14	55	46	+9	68	Promotion play-offs
5	DAV Santa Ana	40	19	9	12	65	41	+24	66	
6	Colmenar Viejo	40	16	13	11	72	59	+13	61	
7	Real Aranjuez	40	16	12	12	62	48	+14	60	
8	Puerta Bonita	40	16	10	14	57	48	+9	58	
9	Colonia Moscardó	40	15	13	12	50	46	+4	58	
10	Alcalá	40	16	7	17	58	46	+12	55	
11	Navalcarnero	40	16	6	18	53	50	+3	54	
12	Carabanchel	40	14	12	14	61	68	−7	54	
13	Rayo Vallecano B	40	14	11	15	47	48	−1	53	
14	Las Rozas	40	10	18	12	43	54	−11	48	
15	Pegaso	40	11	14	15	46	55	−9	47	
16	Villaviciosa de Odón	40	11	13	16	44	59	−15	46	
17	Getafe B	40	12	9	19	40	49	−9	45	
18	Parla (R)	40	10	13	17	38	55	−17	43 (Note: Parla finished ahead of San Fernando de Henares on head-to-head points: Parla–San Fernando de Henares 1–0, San Fernando de Henare–Parla 0–1)	Relegation
19	San Fernando de Henares (R)	40	11	10	19	40	55	−15	43	Relegation
20	Rayo Majadahonda (R)	40	9	8	23	37	71	−34	35	Relegation
21	Aravaca (R)	40	9	4	27	41	96	−55	31	Relegation

Source: Fútbol Regional
(R) Relegated

=== Group 8 ===
Pos	Team	Pld	W	D	L	GF	GA	GD	Pts	Qualification or relegation
1	Zamora	38	24	8	6	72	33	+39	80	Promotion play-offs
2	Gimnástica Segoviana	38	20	14	4	61	24	+37	74	Promotion play-offs
3	Ponferradina	38	20	12	6	63	38	+25	72	Promotion play-offs
4	Real Ávila	38	21	8	9	70	42	+28	71	Promotion play-offs
5	Bembibre	38	18	15	5	60	31	+29	69	
6	Palencia	38	15	15	8	56	39	+17	60	
7	Racing Lermeño	38	17	8	13	46	40	+6	59	
8	Norma San Leonardo	38	16	6	16	47	45	+2	54	
9	Cuéllar	38	12	14	12	57	61	−4	50	
10	La Bañeza	38	13	8	17	51	57	−6	47	
11	Cultural Leonesa B	38	13	7	18	47	49	−2	46	
12	Salamanca B	38	9	17	12	39	35	+4	44	
13	Béjar Industrial	38	11	10	17	45	56	−11	43	
14	Laguna	38	10	11	17	39	48	−9	41	
15	Benavente	38	11	7	20	38	71	−33	40 (Note: Benavente finished ahead of Garray on head-to-head points: Benavente–Garray 2–1, Garray–Benavente 0–0)	
16	Garray	38	8	16	14	30	40	−10	40	
17	Becerril	38	9	12	17	39	53	−14	39	
18	Endesa Ponferrada (R)	38	9	9	20	37	67	−30	36	Relegation
19	Hullera Vasco-Leonesa (R)	38	8	10	20	36	69	−33	34	Relegation
20	Ribert (R)	38	8	9	21	30	65	−35	33	Relegation

Source: Fútbol Regional
(R) Relegated

=== Group 9 ===
Pos	Team	Pld	W	D	L	GF	GA	GD	Pts	Qualification or relegation
1	Málaga B	42	27	10	5	93	33	+60	91	Promotion play-offs
2	Polideportivo Ejido	42	27	8	7	84	35	+49	89	Promotion play-offs
3	Guadix	42	27	5	10	78	40	+38	86	Promotion play-offs
4	Maracena	42	23	12	7	64	29	+35	81	Promotion play-offs
5	Linares	42	20	16	6	58	30	+28	76	
6	Marbella	42	20	13	9	60	31	+29	73	
7	UD San Pedro	42	20	9	13	62	45	+17	69	
8	Granada 74	42	18	8	16	57	53	+4	62	
9	Torredonjimeno	42	17	11	14	46	45	+1	62	
10	San Isidro de Níjar	42	15	12	15	54	59	−5	57	
11	Antequera	42	14	12	16	51	50	+1	54	
12	Juventud de Torremolinos CF	42	14	10	18	41	55	−14	52 (Note: Juventud de Torremolinos finished ahead of Vandalia de Peligros on head-to-head points: Juventud–Vandalia 3–0, Vandalia–Juventud 1–0)	
13	Vandalia de Peligros	42	13	13	16	33	40	−7	52	
14	Vélez	42	13	9	20	45	61	−16	48	
15	Roquetas	42	11	13	18	64	73	−9	46	
16	Úbeda	42	12	10	20	55	73	−18	46	
17	Martos	42	10	16	16	38	61	−23	46	
18	Mármol Macael (R)	42	10	12	20	54	74	−20	42	Relegation
19	Arenas de Armilla (R)	42	7	16	19	36	59	−23	37	Relegation
20	Ronda (R)	42	6	14	22	49	90	−41	32	Relegation
21	Baeza (R)	42	6	12	24	42	85	−43	30	Relegation
22	Imperio de Albolote (R)	42	4	15	23	31	74	−43	27	Relegation

Source: Fútbol Regional
(R) Relegated

=== Group 10 ===
Pos	Team	Pld	W	D	L	GF	GA	GD	Pts	Qualification or relegation
1	Linense	38	24	9	5	56	19	+37	81	Promotion play-offs
2	Dos Hermanas	38	23	11	4	67	28	+39	80	Promotion play-offs
3	Coria	38	20	13	5	61	18	+43	73	Promotion play-offs
4	San Fernando	38	20	11	7	64	35	+29	71	Promotion play-offs
5	Lucentino Industrial	38	17	13	8	52	21	+31	64	
6	Portuense	38	16	11	11	43	34	+9	59	
7	Chiclana	38	14	13	11	44	38	+6	55	
8	Atlético Sanluqueño	38	14	12	12	45	42	+3	54	
9	Viña Verde Montilla	38	12	17	9	35	35	0	53	
10	Tomares	38	13	11	14	43	44	−1	50	
11	Los Palacios	38	13	8	17	52	46	+6	47	
12	Pozoblanco	38	11	13	14	37	44	−7	46 (Note: Pozoblanco finished ahead of Rota and Puerto Real on head-to-head points: Pozoblanco–Rota 0–1, Rota–Pozoblanco 0–2; Pozoblanco–Puerto Real 2–2, Puerto Real–Pozoblanco 0–1; Rota–Puerto Real 2–1, Puerto Real–Rota 0–0)	
13	Rota	38	13	7	18	42	55	−13	46	
14	Puerto Real	38	11	13	14	39	45	−6	46	
15	Ayamonte	38	9	16	13	36	50	−14	43	
16	Los Barrios	38	12	6	20	38	55	−17	42	
17	La Palma	38	7	17	14	40	50	−10	38	
18	Utrera (R)	38	10	7	21	36	62	−26	37	Relegation
19	San Roque de Lepe (R)	38	8	5	25	34	68	−34	29	Relegation
20	Serrallo (R)	38	3	7	28	18	93	−75	13	Relegation

Source: Fútbol Regional
(R) Relegated

=== Group 11 ===
Pos	Team	Pld	W	D	L	GF	GA	GD	Pts	Qualification or relegation
1	Constància	38	26	5	7	75	27	+48	83	Promotion play-offs
2	Poblense	38	22	8	8	60	32	+28	74	Promotion play-offs
3	Ferriolense	38	22	7	9	86	44	+42	73	Promotion play-offs
4	Atlético Baleares	38	20	12	6	84	33	+51	72	Promotion play-offs
5	Manacor	38	21	4	13	65	54	+11	67	
6	Vilafranca	38	17	12	9	69	43	+26	63	
7	Alayor	38	18	8	12	60	56	+4	62	
8	Platges de Calvià	38	16	12	10	52	41	+11	60 (Note: Platges de Calvià finished ahead of Campos on head-to-head points: Campos–Platges de Calvià 1–1, Platges de Calvià–Campos 2–0)	
9	Campos	38	17	9	12	71	55	+16	60	
10	Peña Deportiva	38	14	9	15	46	50	−4	51	
11	Sporting Mahonés	38	13	11	14	53	44	+9	50	
12	Binissalem	38	13	11	14	50	43	+7	50	
13	Génova	38	12	14	12	62	73	−11	50	
14	Atlètic de Ciutadella	38	14	7	17	50	54	−4	49	
15	Ibiza-Eivissa	38	13	9	16	62	67	−5	48	
16	Arenal	38	9	7	22	51	85	−34	34	
17	Pollença	38	8	8	22	28	57	−29	32	
18	Soledad (R)	38	7	10	21	37	81	−44	31	Relegation
19	Andratx (R)	38	4	11	23	27	91	−64	23	Relegation
20	Ferreries (R)	38	4	6	28	29	87	−58	18	Relegation

Source: Fútbol Regional
(R) Relegated

=== Group 12 ===
Pos	Team	Pld	W	D	L	GF	GA	GD	Pts	Qualification or relegation
1	Las Palmas B	38	24	10	4	85	20	+65	82	Promotion play-offs
2	Orotava	38	24	7	7	54	26	+28	79	Promotion play-offs
3	Lanzarote	38	21	10	7	61	31	+30	73	Promotion play-offs
4	Telde	38	21	10	7	53	25	+28	73	Promotion play-offs
5	San Isidro	38	22	6	10	62	32	+30	72	
6	Corralejo	38	21	8	9	66	30	+36	71	
7	La Angostura	38	19	9	10	52	38	+14	66	
8	Gáldar	38	19	7	12	66	38	+28	64	
9	Vecindario	38	14	9	15	53	49	+4	51	
10	Tenisca	38	15	5	18	53	59	−6	50	
11	La Oliva	38	12	8	18	35	47	−12	44	
12	Doramas	38	10	13	15	36	47	−11	43	
13	Tenerife B	38	10	11	17	46	55	−9	41	
14	Realejos	38	9	13	16	41	61	−20	40	
15	Ibarra	38	10	9	19	33	52	−19	39	
16	Maspalomas	38	8	13	17	35	48	−13	37	
17	Victoria	38	8	11	19	38	65	−27	35	
18	Unión Carrizal (R)	38	10	4	24	43	81	−38	34	Relegation
19	Atlético Arona (R)	38	6	10	22	25	88	−63	28	Relegation
20	Esperanza (R)	38	6	9	23	29	74	−45	27	Relegation

Source: Fútbol Regional
(R) Relegated

=== Group 13 ===
Pos	Team	Pld	W	D	L	GF	GA	GD	Pts	Qualification or relegation
1	Orihuela	38	27	6	5	86	28	+58	87	Promotion play-offs
2	Lorca	38	25	7	6	81	28	+53	82	Promotion play-offs
3	Mar Menor	38	23	9	6	73	32	+41	78	Promotion play-offs
4	Horadada	38	23	5	10	67	31	+36	74	Promotion play-offs
5	Olímpico de Totana	38	17	10	11	57	46	+11	61	
6	Relesa Las Palas	38	18	7	13	46	43	+3	61	
7	Bullense	38	16	12	10	48	33	+15	60	
8	Recreativo Orenés Alhameño	38	16	10	12	47	40	+7	58	
9	Caravaca	38	15	7	16	43	40	+3	52	
10	Jumilla	38	14	8	16	44	47	−3	50	
11	Real Murcia B	38	12	12	14	37	32	+5	48	
12	Cieza	38	13	8	17	41	48	−7	47	
13	Abarán (R)	38	13	6	19	46	61	−15	45	Relegation
14	Alquerías	38	11	10	17	38	62	−24	43	
15	Lumbreras	38	10	12	16	42	72	−30	42	
16	Sangonera Atlético	38	7	16	15	34	48	−14	37	
17	Beniel	38	9	10	19	30	52	−22	37	
18	Santomera (R)	38	8	9	21	31	62	−31	33	Relegation
19	Blanca (R)	38	7	8	23	32	65	−33	29	Relegation
20	Imperial (R)	38	5	10	23	26	79	−53	25	Relegation

Source: Fútbol Regional
(R) Relegated

=== Group 14 ===
Pos	Team	Pld	W	D	L	GF	GA	GD	Pts	Qualification or relegation
1	Grabasa Burguillos	38	25	10	3	81	26	+55	85	Promotion play-offs
2	Villafranca	38	26	6	6	83	16	+67	84	Promotion play-offs
3	Don Benito	38	25	8	5	76	18	+58	83	Promotion play-offs
4	Mérida Promesas	38	21	9	8	71	27	+44	72	Promotion play-offs
5	Extremadura B	38	20	11	7	61	28	+33	71	
6	Valdelacalzada	38	21	8	9	63	35	+28	71	
7	Zafra Industrial	38	19	11	8	52	25	+27	68	
8	Badajoz B	38	19	9	10	59	37	+22	66	
9	Coria	38	17	8	13	57	55	+2	59	
10	Monesterio	38	15	10	13	39	36	+3	55	
11	Guareña	38	15	5	18	50	52	−2	50	
12	Villanueva	37	14	7	16	38	46	−8	49	
13	Cacereño B	38	12	4	22	47	74	−27	40	
14	Olivenza	38	10	9	19	48	67	−19	39	
15	La Estrella	38	10	8	20	36	60	−24	38	
16	Santa Amalia (Note: Relegated due to the relegations of regional teams from Segunda División B.)	38	10	8	20	36	62	−26	38	Relegation
17	Castuera (Note: Relegated due to the relegations of regional teams from Segunda División B.) (R)	38	10	6	22	39	69	−30	36	Relegation
18	Guadiana (R)	38	8	2	28	38	95	−57	26	Relegation
19	Valencia de Alcántara (R)	38	3	11	24	24	83	−59	20	Relegation
20	Cabezuela (R)	37	2	4	31	19	106	−87	8	Relegation

Source: Fútbol Regional
(R) Relegated

=== Group 15 ===
Pos	Team	Pld	W	D	L	GF	GA	GD	Pts	Qualification or relegation
1	Peña Sport	38	24	11	3	78	28	+50	83	Promotion play-offs
2	Azkoyen	38	22	8	8	67	39	+28	74	Promotion play-offs
3	Izarra	38	18	14	6	54	26	+28	68	Promotion play-offs
4	Logroñés B	38	17	15	6	55	34	+21	66	Promotion play-offs
5	Tudelano	38	15	14	9	53	44	+9	59	
6	Mirandés	38	17	7	14	54	47	+7	58	
7	Chantrea	38	14	14	10	45	39	+6	56	
8	Oberena	38	15	7	16	53	58	−5	52	
9	Burladés	38	11	16	11	51	51	0	49	
10	Egüés	38	13	10	15	47	49	−2	49	
11	Beti Onak	38	12	12	14	42	54	−12	48	
12	Alfaro	38	11	12	15	33	41	−8	45	
13	Aoiz	38	10	13	15	33	37	−4	43	
14	Haro Deportivo	38	9	16	13	44	52	−8	43	
15	Huarte	38	10	13	15	50	61	−11	43	
16	San Juan	38	7	20	11	35	36	−1	41	
17	Atlético Artajonés	38	10	11	17	35	53	−18	41	
18	Berceo (R)	38	11	8	19	44	66	−22	41	Relegation
19	Murchante (R)	38	8	11	19	36	57	−21	35	Relegation
20	Rapid Murillo (R)	38	7	6	25	27	64	−37	27	Relegation

Source: Fútbol Regional
(R) Relegated

=== Group 16 ===
Pos	Team	Pld	W	D	L	GF	GA	GD	Pts	Qualification or relegation
1	Endesa Andorra	38	29	5	4	106	28	+78	92	Promotion play-offs
2	Casetas	38	25	11	2	84	27	+57	86	Promotion play-offs
3	Figueruelas	38	17	15	6	45	31	+14	66	Promotion play-offs
4	Barbastro	38	19	7	12	64	49	+15	64	Promotion play-offs
5	Huesca	38	16	13	9	63	49	+14	61	
6	Teruel	38	17	9	12	48	43	+5	60	
7	Fraga	38	17	8	13	66	42	+24	59	
8	Alcañiz	38	15	12	11	59	51	+8	57	
9	Utebo	38	14	13	11	62	43	+19	55	
10	Illueca	38	15	8	15	43	50	−7	53	
11	Sariñena	38	12	13	13	39	42	−3	49	
12	Fuentes	38	14	5	19	51	77	−26	47	
13	Lalueza	38	12	9	17	40	56	−16	45	
14	Villanueva	38	12	7	19	51	59	−8	43	
15	La Almunia	38	10	12	16	51	64	−13	42	
16	Atlético Monzalbarba	38	11	8	19	54	65	−11	41	
17	Tamarite (R)	38	9	10	19	40	60	−20	37	Relegation
18	Zuera (R)	38	8	9	21	43	71	−28	33	Relegation
19	Endesa Escatrón (R)	38	7	10	21	40	86	−46	31	Relegation
20	Atlético Monzón (R)	38	6	6	26	36	92	−56	24	Relegation

Source: Fútbol Regional
(R) Relegated

=== Group 17 ===
Pos	Team	Pld	W	D	L	GF	GA	GD	Pts	Qualification or relegation
1	Tomelloso	38	20	17	1	69	25	+44	77	Promotion play-offs
2	Guadalajara	38	20	12	6	69	34	+35	72	Promotion play-offs
3	Hellín Deportivo	38	20	12	6	54	27	+27	72	Promotion play-offs
4	Albacete B	38	19	14	5	60	30	+30	71	Promotion play-offs
5	Puertollano Industrial	38	18	15	5	66	32	+34	69	
6	Villarrobledo	38	19	12	7	70	24	+46	69	
7	Toledo B	38	18	11	9	51	36	+15	65	
8	Piedrabuena	38	17	10	11	47	40	+7	61	
9	Valdepeñas	38	14	14	10	58	30	+28	56	
10	Cuenca	38	13	15	10	46	37	+9	54	
11	Socuéllamos	38	15	7	16	54	62	−8	52	
12	Torrijos	38	12	12	14	37	51	−14	48	
13	Torpedo 66	38	12	9	17	49	62	−13	45	
14	Almansa	38	11	7	20	36	57	−21	40	
15	Gimnástico Alcázar	38	11	6	21	42	61	−19	39	
16	La Solana	38	9	8	21	36	67	−31	35	
17	Bolañego	38	8	9	21	24	74	−50	33	
18	Belmonte (R)	38	7	10	21	44	72	−28	31	Relegation
19	Talavera (R)	38	5	12	21	27	64	−37	27	Relegation
20	Atlético Teresiano (R)	38	3	6	29	25	79	−54	15	Relegation

Source: Fútbol Regional
(R) Relegated
