= Muleño CF =

Association football club in Spain

Muleño
- Full name: Muleño Club de Fútbol
- Founded: 1986
- Ground: Estadio Municipal, Mula, Spain
- Capacity: 5,000
- Chairman: (Spain) Antonio Requena
- Manager: (Spain) Salva Bernal
- League: Tercera Federación – Group 13
- 2024–25: Tercera Federación – Group 13, 13th of 18
Home colours	Away colours

Muleño Club de Fútbol is a football team based in Mula, Murcia. Founded in 1986, the team plays in Tercera Federación – Group 13, holding home games at Estadio Municipal.

== Season to season ==
Season	Tier	Division	Place	Copa del Rey
1986–87	7	2ª Reg.	3rd	
1987–88	6	1ª Reg.	7th	
1988–89	5	Reg. Pref.	7th	
1989–90	5	Reg. Pref.	5th	
1990–91	5	Reg. Pref.	1st	
1991–92	4	3ª	13th	
1992–93	4	3ª	14th	
1993–94	4	3ª	13th	
1994–95	4	3ª	4th	
1995–96	4	3ª	20th	
1996–97	5	Terr. Pref.	6th	
1997–98	5	Terr. Pref.	3rd	
1998–99	5	Terr. Pref.	4th	
1999–2000	4	3ª	18th	
2000–01	5	Terr. Pref.	8th	
2001–02	5	Terr. Pref.	11th	
2002–03	5	Terr. Pref.	2nd	
2003–04	4	3ª	19th	
2004–05	5	Terr. Pref.	5th	
2005–06	4	3ª	18th	

Season	Tier	Division	Place	Copa del Rey
2006–07	5	Terr. Pref.	1st	
2007–08	4	3ª	13th	
2008–09	4	3ª	19th	
2009–10	5	Terr. Pref.	9th	
2010–11	5	Pref. Aut.	13th	
2011–12	5	Pref. Aut.	6th	
2012–13	5	Pref. Aut.	1st	
2013–14	4	3ª	15th	
2014–15	4	3ª	11th	
2015–16	4	3ª	10th	
2016–17	4	3ª	15th	
2017–18	4	3ª	11th	
2018–19	4	3ª	14th	
2019–20	4	3ª	9th	
2020–21	4	3ª	10th / 9th	
2021–22	6	Pref. Aut.	1st	
2022–23	5	3ª Fed.	15th	
2023–24	5	3ª Fed.	9th	
2024–25	5	3ª Fed.	13th	
2025–26	5	3ª Fed.		

- 18 seasons in Tercera División
- 4 seasons in Tercera Federación

== Notable players ==
- (Argentina) Damián Timpani
- (Spain) Pedro León
- (Spain) Javi García
