= Villanueva CF =

Association football club in Spain

Villanueva
- Full name: Villanueva Club de Fútbol
- Founded: 1974
- Ground: Nuevo Enrique Porta, Villanueva, Aragon, Spain
- Capacity: 2,000
- Chairman: (Spain) Alberto Calvo
- Manager: (Spain) Enrique Benedi
- League: Segunda Regional – Group 1
- 2024–25: Primera Regional – Group 1, 16th of 18 (relegated)
Home colours	Away colours

Villanueva Club de Fútbol is a Spanish football team based in Villanueva de Gállego, in the autonomous community of Aragon. Founded in 1974 it plays in Segunda Regional – Group 1, holding home games at Estadio Nuevo Enrique Porta, with a capacity for 2,000 spectators.

== Season to season ==
Season	Tier	Division	Place	Copa del Rey
1974–75	7	2ª Reg.	15th	
1975–76	7	2ª Reg.	7th	
1976–77	7	2ª Reg.	12th	
1977–78	8	3ª Reg.	7th	
1978–79	7	2ª Reg.	5th	
1979–80	7	2ª Reg.	7th	
1980–81	7	2ª Reg.	2nd	
1981–82	7	2ª Reg.	9th	
1982–83	7	2ª Reg.	1st	
1983–84	6	1ª Reg.	4th	
1984–85	6	1ª Reg.	1st	
1985–86	5	Reg. Pref.	19th	
1986–87	5	Reg. Pref.	19th	
1987–88	5	Reg. Pref.	8th	
1988–89	5	Reg. Pref.	3rd	
1989–90	5	Reg. Pref.	6th	
1990–91	5	Reg. Pref.	5th	
1991–92	5	Reg. Pref.	4th	
1992–93	5	Reg. Pref.	4th	
1993–94	5	Reg. Pref.	5th	

Season	Tier	Division	Place	Copa del Rey
1994–95	5	Reg. Pref.	3rd	
1995–96	5	Reg. Pref.	6th	
1996–97	5	Reg. Pref.	1st	
1997–98	4	3ª	11th	
1998–99	4	3ª	14th	
1999–2000	4	3ª	10th	
2000–01	4	3ª	8th	
2001–02	4	3ª	15th	
2002–03	4	3ª	18th	
2003–04	5	Reg. Pref.	1st	
2004–05	4	3ª	6th	
2005–06	4	3ª	13th	
2006–07	4	3ª	10th	
2007–08	4	3ª	7th	
2008–09	4	3ª	12th	
2009–10	4	3ª	8th	
2010–11	4	3ª	8th	
2011–12	4	3ª	8th	
2012–13	4	3ª	10th	
2013–14	4	3ª	11th	

Season	Tier	Division	Place	Copa del Rey
2014–15	4	3ª	16th	
2015–16	4	3ª	19th	
2016–17	5	Reg. Pref.	12th	
2017–18	5	Reg. Pref.	1st	
2018–19	4	3ª	13th	
2019–20	4	3ª	19th	
2020–21	4	3ª	11th / 10th	
2021–22	6	Reg. Pref.	5th	
2022–23	6	Reg. Pref.	12th	
2023–24	7	1ª Reg.	8th	
2024–25	7	1ª Reg.	16th	
2025–26	8	2ª Reg.		

- 21 seasons in Tercera División
