= Sangonera Atlético CF =

Spanish football club

Sangonera Atlético
- Full name: Sangonera Atlético Club de Fútbol
- Founded: 1996
- Dissolved: 2010 (relocated)
- Ground: El Mayayo, Sangonera, Murcia, Spain
- Capacity: 2,500
- 2009–10: 2ªB - Group 2, 12th
Home colours	Away colours

Sangonera Atlético Club de Fútbol was a Spanish football team based in Sangonera la Verde (a neighborhood of Murcia), in the Region of Murcia. Founded in 1996, it was dissolved in 2010, and held home matches at Estadio El Mayayo, with a capacity of 2,500 seats.

== History ==
Founded in 1996, Sangonera reached the national categories in the following year, going on to spend one full decade in the fourth division, achieving promotion in the 2007–08 season.

After finishing 12th in 2009–10, the club was forced to fold, due to an accumulated debt of €340.000 from previous seasons. Subsequently, it was transferred to Lorca and renamed Lorca Atlético CF; Benigno Sánchez was appointed the new club's coach.

== Season to season ==
Season	Tier	Division	Place	Copa del Rey
1996–97	5	Terr. Pref.	1st	
1997–98	4	3ª	3rd	
1998–99	4	3ª	16th	
1999–2000	4	3ª	14th	
2000–01	4	3ª	7th	
2001–02	4	3ª	5th	
2002–03	4	3ª	5th	

Season	Tier	Division	Place	Copa del Rey
2003–04	4	3ª	9th	
2004–05	4	3ª	2nd	
2005–06	4	3ª	5th	
2006–07	4	3ª	4th	
2007–08	4	3ª	2nd	
2008–09	3	2ª B	9th	
2009–10	3	2ª B	12th	

- 2 seasons in Segunda División B
- 10 seasons in Tercera División
- 1 season in Categorías Regionales

== Notable players ==
- (Equatorial Guinea) (Spain) Fernando Obama
- (France) Mickaël Gaffoor
- (Greece) Grégory Sofikitis
- (Spain) Copito
- (Spain) Pérez García
- (Spain) Magín
- (Spain) Jero Miñarro
- (Spain) Iñaki Bollain
- (Senegal) Momo Coly
- (Tunisia) Aid Slimane
