= CD Plus Ultra =

Association football club in Spain

Plus Ultra
- Full name: Club Deportivo Plus Ultra
- Founded: 1924; 102 years ago
- Stadium: Estadio Municipal
- Capacity: 2,000
- President: Ana Ruiz Mata
- Head coach: Cholo
- League: Segunda Autonómica – Group 1
- 2025–26: Segunda Autonómica – Group 1, 14th of 14
Home colours	Away colours

Club Deportivo Plus Ultra is a football team based in Llano de Brujas, Murcia. Founded in 1924, the team plays in Segunda Autonómica – Group 1, holding home matches at the Estadio Municipal.

== Season to season ==
Season	Tier	Division	Place	Copa del Rey
1972–73	6	2ª Reg.	8th	
1973–74	6	2ª Reg.	3rd	
1974–75	5	1ª Reg.	18th	
1975–76	6	2ª Reg.	5th	
1976–77	6	2ª Reg.	15th	
1977–1982	DNP			
1982–83	7	2ª Reg.	12th	
1983–84	DNP			
1984–85	DNP			
1985–86	DNP			
1986–87	7	2ª Reg.	1st	
1987–88	6	1ª Reg.	9th	
1988–89	6	1ª Reg.	2nd	
1989–90	5	Reg. Pref.	19th	
1990–91	DNP			
1991–92	7	2ª Reg.	5th	
1992–93	6	1ª Reg.	15th	
1993–2002	DNP			
2002–03	6	1ª Terr.	5th	
2003–04	5	Terr. Pref.	13th	

Season	Tier	Division	Place	Copa del Rey
2004–05	5	Terr. Pref.	18th	
2005–06	5	Terr. Pref.	12th	
2006–07	5	Terr. Pref.	15th	
2007–08	5	Terr. Pref.	6th	
2008–09	4	3ª	15th	
2009–10	4	3ª	9th	
2010–11	4	3ª	12th	
2011–12	4	3ª	10th	
2012–13	4	3ª	6th	
2013–14	4	3ª	10th	
2014–15	4	3ª	10th	
2015–16	4	3ª	16th	
2016–17	5	Pref. Aut.	15th	
2017–18	5	Pref. Aut.	6th	
2018–19	5	Pref. Aut.	5th	
2019–20	4	3ª	20th	
2020–21	4	3ª	11th / 8th	
2021–22	6	Pref. Aut.	10th	
2022–23	6	Pref. Aut.	1st	
2023–24	5	3ª Fed.	11th	

Season	Tier	Division	Place	Copa del Rey
2024–25	5	3ª Fed.	18th	
2025–26	8	2ª Aut.	14th	
2026–27	8	2ª Aut.		

- 10 seasons in Tercera División
- 2 seasons in Tercera Federación
