= Águilas FC =

Association football club in Spain

Águilas
- Full name: Águilas Fútbol Club
- Founded: 30 July 2010; 16 years ago
- Stadium: El Rubial
- Capacity: 4,000
- President: Alfonso García Gabarrón
- Head coach: Adrián Hernández
- League: Primera Federación – Group 2
- 2025–26: Segunda Federación – Group 4, 3rd of 18 (promoted via play-offs)
- Website: www.aguilasfc.es
Home colours	Away colours

Águilas Fútbol Club is a Spanish football club based in Águilas, in the autonomous community of Murcia. Founded in 2010, the club plays in Primera Federación – Group 2, holding home games at Estadio El Rubial, with a 4,000-seat capacity.

== History ==
In 2010, Águilas Club de Fútbol was dissolved due to large debts. A few months later, Águilas CF fans founded Águilas FC and bought the place of CD Alquerías in the fifth division.

== Season to season ==
Season	Tier	Division	Place	Copa del Rey
2010–11	5	Pref. Aut.	1st	
2011–12	4	3ª	2nd	
2012–13	4	3ª	12th	
2013–14	4	3ª	3rd	
2014–15	4	3ª	4th	
2015–16	4	3ª	2nd	
2016–17	4	3ª	3rd	
2017–18	4	3ª	7th	
2018–19	4	3ª	6th	
2019–20	4	3ª	16th	
2020–21	4	3ª	2nd / 1st	
2021–22	4	2ª RFEF	13th	First round
2022–23	5	3ª Fed.	1st	
2023–24	4	2ª Fed.	7th	First round
2024–25	4	2ª Fed.	8th	First round
2025–26	4	2ª Fed.	3rd	
2026–27	3	1ª Fed.		First round

- 1 season in Primera Federación
- 4 seasons in Segunda Federación/Segunda División RFEF
- 10 seasons in Tercera División
- 1 season in Tercera Federación

== Players ==
As of 4 November 2026

Note: Flags indicate national team as defined under FIFA eligibility rules; some limited exceptions apply. Players may hold more than one non-FIFA nationality.

No.	Pos.	Nation	Player
1	GK	ESP	Iván Martínez
2	DF	COL	Johan Terranova
3	DF	ESP	José Mas
4	DF	ESP	Antonio Sánchez
5	MF	ESP	Adrián Pérez
6	MF	ESP	Yasser El Arbaoui
7	FW	ESP	Serpeta (on loan from Castellón)
8	MF	ESP	Mario Abenza
9	FW	ESP	Chris Martínez
10	FW	ESP	Javi Castedo
11	FW	ESP	Josema Raigal
12	FW	GHA	Seyran Viglo (on loan from Murcia)

No.	Pos.	Nation	Player
13	GK	ESP	José Salcedo
14	MF	ESP	Alonso Nyada
15	DF	ESP	Fromsa Mateo
16	MF	ESP	Alberto Collado
17	DF	ESP	Dani Merchán
18	MF	ESP	Jesús Carrillo
19	FW	ESP	Gonzalo Serrano
20	FW	ESP	Usher Lobede
21	MF	ESP	Adrián Heredia
22	DF	ESP	Álex Revuelta
23	DF	ESP	Héctor Martínez

=== Reserve team ===
Note: Flags indicate national team as defined under FIFA eligibility rules; some limited exceptions apply. Players may hold more than one non-FIFA nationality.

No.	Pos.	Nation	Player
30	FW	ESP	Isma Rubio
31	MF	ESP	Emilio de Teresa

== Honours ==
- Preferente Autonómica

Winners: 2010–11

- Tercera División

Winners: 2020–21 (group 13)
Runners-up: 2011–12, 2015–16

- Tercera Federación

Winners: 2022–23 (group 13)
