= CD Lumbreras =

Spanish football team

Lumbreras
- Full name: Club Deportivo Lumbreras
- Founded: 1968
- Ground: Estadio Municipal, Puerto Lumbreras, Spain
- Capacity: 2,000
- Chairman: (Spain) Juan Martínez González
- Manager: (Spain) Juan Moya
- League: Preferente Autonómica
- 2025–26: Preferente Autonómica, 7th of 18
Home colours	Away colours

Club Deportivo Lumbreras is a football team based in Puerto Lumbreras, Murcia. Founded in 1968, the team plays in Preferente Autonómica. The club's home ground is Estadio Municipal.

== Season to season ==
Season	Tier	Division	Place	Copa del Rey
1969–70	5	2ª Reg.	14th	
1970–71	5	2ª Reg.	8th	
1971–72	6	2ª Reg.	2nd	
1972–73	6	2ª Reg.	5th	
1973–74	6	2ª Reg.	3rd	
1974–75	5	1ª Reg.	7th	
1975–76	5	1ª Reg.	(R)	
1976–77	6	2ª Reg.	5th	
1977–78	7	2ª Reg.	1st	
1978–79	6	1ª Reg.	7th	
1979–80	6	1ª Reg.	16th	
1980–81	5	Reg. Pref.	4th	
1981–82	5	Reg. Pref.	6th	
1982–83	5	Reg. Pref.	(R)	
1983–1989	DNP			
1989–90	7	2ª Reg.	2nd	
1990–91	6	1ª Reg.	12th	
1991–92	6	1ª Reg.	7th	
1992–93	6	1ª Reg.	7th	
1993–94	5	Reg. Pref.	12th	

Season	Tier	Division	Place	Copa del Rey
1994–95	5	Reg. Pref.	12th	
1995–96	5	Reg. Pref.	18th	
1996–97	5	Terr. Pref.	8th	
1997–98	5	Terr. Pref.	3rd	
1998–99	4	3ª	15th	
1999–2000	4	3ª	15th	
2000–01	4	3ª	22nd	
2001–02	5	Terr. Pref.	6th	
2002–03	4	3ª	14th	
2003–04	4	3ª	20th	
2004–05	5	Terr. Pref.	19th	
2005–06	6	1ª Terr.	10th	
2006–07	6	1ª Terr.	10th	
2007–08	5	Terr. Pref.	1st	
2008–09	4	3ª	17th	
2009–10	4	3ª	19th	
2010–11	5	Pref. Aut.	18th	
2011–12	6	1ª Aut.	11th	
2012–13	5	Pref. Aut.	16th	
2013–14	6	1ª Aut.	15th	

Season	Tier	Division	Place	Copa del Rey
2014–15	6	1ª Aut.	12th	
2015–16	6	1ª Aut.	6th	
2016–17	5	Pref. Aut.	18th	
2017–18	6	1ª Aut.	13th	
2018–19	6	1ª Aut.	15th	
2019–20	6	1ª Aut.	15th	
2020–21	6	1ª Aut.	5th	
2021–22	7	1ª Aut.	1st	
2022–23	6	Pref. Aut.	11th	
2023–24	7	1ª Aut.	2nd	
2024–25	6	Pref. Aut.	13th	
2025–26	6	Pref. Aut.	7th	
2026–27	6	Pref. Aut.		

- 7 seasons in Tercera División
