= CD Beniel =

Spanish football team

Beniel
- Full name: Club Deportivo Beniel
- Founded: 1976
- Ground: Villa de Beniel, Beniel, Spain
- Capacity: 4,000
- Chairman: (Spain) Manuel Simón Ponce
- Manager: (Spain) Kike Abenza
- League: Preferente Autonómica
- 2024–25: Primera Autonómica – Group 2, 1st of 16 (champions)
Home colours	Away colours

Club Deportivo Beniel is a football team based in Beniel, Murcia. Founded in 1976, the team plays in Preferente Autonómica. The club's home ground is Estadio Villa de Beniel.

== Season to season ==
Season	Tier	Division	Place	Copa del Rey
1978–79	7	2ª Reg.	2nd	
1979–80	7	2ª Reg.	4th	
1980–81	6	1ª Reg.	4th	
1981–82	6	1ª Reg.	3rd	
1982–83	5	Reg. Pref.	14th	
1983–84	5	Reg. Pref.	7th	
1984–85	5	Reg. Pref.	4th	
1985–86	5	Reg. Pref.	9th	
1986–87	5	Reg. Pref.	2nd	
1987–88	4	3ª	6th	
1988–89	4	3ª	12th	
1989–90	4	3ª	18th	
1990–91	5	Reg. Pref.	2nd	
1991–92	4	3ª	1st	
1992–93	4	3ª	5th	First round
1993–94	4	3ª	10th	First round
1994–95	4	3ª	12th	
1995–96	4	3ª	13th	
1996–97	4	3ª	15th	
1997–98	4	3ª	16th	

Season	Tier	Division	Place	Copa del Rey
1998–99	4	3ª	17th	
1999–2000	4	3ª	20th	
2000–01	5	Terr. Pref.	5th	
2001–02	5	Terr. Pref.	1st	
2002–03	4	3ª	18th	
2003–04	5	Terr. Pref.	9th	
2004–05	5	Terr. Pref.	17th	
2005–06	5	Terr. Pref.	4th	
2006–07	4	3ª	20th	
2007–08	5	Terr. Pref.	3rd	
2008–09	4	3ª	9th	
2009–10	4	3ª	14th	
2010–11	4	3ª	19th	
2011–12	5	Pref. Aut.	1st	
2012–13	4	3ª	17th	
2013–14	5	Pref. Aut.	7th	
2014–15	7	2ª Aut.	9th	
2015–16	6	1ª Aut.	8th	
2016–17	6	1ª Aut.	13th	
2017–18	6	1ª Aut.	1st	

Season	Tier	Division	Place	Copa del Rey
2018–19	5	Pref. Aut.	11th	
2019–20	5	Pref. Aut.	13th	
2020–21	5	Pref. Aut.	10th	
2021–22	6	Pref. Aut.	6th	
2022–23	6	Pref. Aut.	12th	
2023–24	7	1ª Aut.	10th	
2024–25	7	1ª Aut.	1st	
2025–26	6	Pref. Aut.		

- 18 seasons in Tercera División

== Honours ==
- Tercera División

Winners (1): 1991–92
