= SFC Minerva =

Association football club in Spain

- Full name: Sociedad Fomento y Cultura Minerva
- Founded: 2012
- Ground: El Secante, Alumbres, Murcia, Spain
- Capacity: 1,000
- Chairman: Manuel Tortosa
- Manager: Luis Franco
- League: Tercera Federación – Group 13
- 2025–26: Tercera Federación – Group 13, 10th of 18
Home colours	Away colours

Sociedad Fomento y Cultura Minerva is a Spanish football team based in Alumbres, Cartagena, in the Region of Murcia. Founded in 2012, it plays in Tercera Federación – Group 13, and holding home matches at Campo Municipal de Alumbres, often known as El Secante.

Luis Franco is actually coaching the team, and Ricardo Gutiérrez helps him as the Second Trainer. The Physical Trainer is Isaac Vilar. Finally, as Goalkeeper trainer, Sergio Caballero, also known as 'Ryutron'.

== Season to season ==
Season	Tier	Division	Place	Copa del Rey
2012–13	7	2ª Aut.	9th	
2013–14	7	2ª Aut.	10th	
2014–15	6	1ª Aut.	1st	
2015–16	5	Pref. Aut.	5th	
2016–17	5	Pref. Aut.	1st	
2017–18	4	3ª	5th	
2018–19	4	3ª	15th	
2019–20	4	3ª	8th	
2020–21	4	3ª	9th / 5th	
2021–22	6	Pref. Aut.	3rd	
2022–23	6	Pref. Aut.	4th	
2023–24	6	Pref. Aut.	5th	
2024–25	5	3ª Fed.	15th	
2025–26	5	3ª Fed.	10th	
2026–27	5	3ª Fed.		

- 4 seasons in Tercera División
- 3 seasons in Tercera Federación
