= Mazarrón FC =

- Full name: Mazarrón Football Club
- Founded: 2010
- Ground: Pedro Méndez Méndez, Mazarrón, Murcia, Spain
- Capacity: 3,500
- President: Diego Arango
- Head coach: Kenny
- League: Tercera Federación – Group 13
- 2025–26: Tercera Federación – Group 13, 5th of 18
Home colours	Away colours

Mazarrón Fútbol Club is a Spanish football club based in the municipality of Mazarrón in the autonomous community of Region de Murcia. Founded in 2010 after its predecessor Mazarrón CF was dissolved, they currently play in Tercera Federación – Group 13. They play their home games at Estadio Municipal Pedro Méndez Méndez, which has a capacity of around 3,500 people

== History ==
Mazarrón FC was founded on 2 August 2010 as a replacement to dissolved Mazarrón CF, with former player José Miguel Rodríguez becoming the team's president. Initially taking the place of CFS El Progreso, the club spent their first two seasons in the Regional Preferente, the first tier of regional football (fifth tier), before suffering relegation to Primera Regional.

After two seasons in the sixth tier, Mazarrón returned to Preferente in 2016, promoting to Tercera División in 2018. In 2020, they reached the promotion play-offs after finishing fifth (the fourth, Real Murcia Imperial, was unavailable for promotion); it was subsequently knocked out by CF Lorca Deportiva, however.

On 5 July 2023, Mazarrón reached an agreement with Real Murcia CF to become their second reserve team. The club finished first in the Preferente Autonómica, but was ineligible for promotion as Murcia Imperial remained in Tercera Federación; on 2 August 2024, the affiliation ended.

== Season to season ==
Season	Tier	Division	Place	Copa del Rey
2010–11	5	Pref. Aut.	14th	
2011–12	5	Pref. Aut.	18th	
2012–13	6	1ª Aut.	9th	
2013–14	6	1ª Aut.	12th	
2014–15	6	1ª Aut.	4th	
2015–16	5	Pref. Aut.	7th	
2016–17	5	Pref. Aut.	4th	
2017–18	5	Pref. Aut.	4th	
2018–19	4	3ª	10th	
2019–20	4	3ª	5th	
2020–21	4	3ª	6th / 6th	
2021–22	5	3ª RFEF	16th	
2022–23	6	Pref. Aut.	5th	
2023–24	6	Pref. Aut.	1st	N/A (Note: Second reserve team of Murcia.)
2024–25	6	Pref. Aut.	1st	
2025–26	5	3ª Fed.	5th	
2026–27	5	3ª Fed.		

- 3 seasons in Tercera División
- 3 seasons in Tercera Federación/Tercera División RFEF

== Presidents ==
- 2010–2016: José Miguel Rodríguez
- 2016–2021: Rubén Martínez Collado
- 2021–present: Diego Arango

== Managerial history ==
- (Spain) Agustín Pérez (2010–2012)
- (Netherlands) Jelco Oosterhof (2012–2013)
- (Spain) Antonio Lorente (2012–2014)
- (Spain) Javier García (2014–2015)
- (Spain) José Moreno (2016–2017)
- (Spain) Paco Pliego (2017–2018)
- (Spain) Juanjo Asensio (2018–2020)
- (Spain) Sergio Sánchez (2020–2021)
- (Spain) Kenny (2021)
- (Spain) Jonatan Di Giosia (2021–2022)
- (Spain) David Bascuñana (2022)
- (Spain) Paco Luna (2022–2023)
- (Spain) Juan Andreo (2023–2024)
- (Spain) Kenny (2024–)

== Stadium ==
Mazarrón play their home games at the Estadio Municipal Pedro Méndez Méndez with natural grass, which has a capacity of around 3,500 people. The stadium was named Municipal de Mazarrón until 2018, when it was changed to the current name.

== Club Data ==
- Seasons in First División: 0
- Seasons in Second División: 0
- Seasons in First RFEF: 0
- Seasons in Second RFEF: 0
- Seasons in Third RFEF: 1
- Seasons in Preferred Murcian: 6
- Seasons in First Autonomous: 3
- Seasons in Second Autonomous: 0
- Seasons in Third División (Extinct): 3
- Seasons in Second División B (Extinct): 0
- Biggest win achieved: .5-0
  - in national championships: .
- Biggest win conceded: 2-6
  - in national championships: .
- Best league position: .5
- Worst place in the league: 16.
- Top scorer: .
- Goalkeeper less thrashed: .
- more matches played: .Juan Andreo Mula
