= Divisiones Regionales de Fútbol in the Region of Murcia =

The Divisiones Regionales de Fútbol in the Region of Murcia are organised by the Football Federation of the Region of Murcia:

- Preferente Autonómica de la Región de Murcia (Level 6 of the Spanish football pyramid)
- Primera Autonómica de Murcia (Level 7)
- Segunda Autonómica de Murcia (Level 8)

== League chronology ==
Timeline

== Preferente Autonómica ==
Preferente Autonómica
- Founded: Unknown
- Country: Spain
- Number of clubs: 18
- Level on pyramid: 6
- Promotion to: 3ª Federación – Group 13
- Relegation to: Primera Autonómica
- Website: https://www.ffrm.es/

Preferente Autonómica is the sixth level of competition of the Spanish football league system in that community. The league consists of a group of 18 teams. At the end of the season, the first two teams (places 1 and 2) are automatically promoted to Tercera Federación (Group 13). Places 3 to 6 enter a second (knock-out) phase to determine one further promoted team. Last three teams are relegated to the Primera Autonómica.

=== 2022–23 teams ===
==== Group 1 ====
- Algar
- Algezares
- Águilas FC B
- Bala Azul
- Balsicas Atlético
- Lumbreras
- Luis Guarch
- Minerva
- Mazarrón
- Mar Menor B
- Olímpico Totana
- Santa Cruz

==== Group 2 ====
- Abarán
- Beniel
- Churra
- Cabezo de Torres
- Jumilla Atlético
- Plus Ultra
- Los Garres
- Montecasillas
- El Raal
- Unión Molinense
- Villa de Fortuna
- Yeclano Deportivo B

=== Champions ===
Season	Winner
2010–11	Águilas
2011–12	Beniel
2012–13	Muleño
2013–14	EF Alhama
2014–15	Lorca Deportiva
2015–16	Sangonera la Verde
2016–17	Minerva
2017–18	Ciudad de Murcia
2018–19	El Palmar

== Primera Autonómica ==
Primera Autonómica
- Founded: 2008
- Country: Spain
- Number of clubs: 16
- Level on pyramid: 7
- Promotion to: Preferente Autonómica
- Relegation to: Segunda Autonómica
- Website: https://www.ffrm.es/

Primera Autonómica is the seventh level of competition of the Spanish football league system in that community, founded in 2008. The league consists of a group of 16 teams. At the end of the season the first three teams are promoted and the last three are relegated to Segunda Autonómica.

== Segunda Autonómica ==
Segunda Autonómica
- Founded: Unknown
- Country: Spain
- Number of clubs: 15
- Level on pyramid: 8
- Promotion to: Primera Autonómica
- Relegation to: None
- Website: https://www.ffrm.es/

Segunda Autonómica is the eighth and last level of Spanish football league system in Murcia region. This level consists in two groups of 14 teams each one. At the end of the season, the winners of each group are promoted. There are not relegations.
