= CD Bala Azul =

Spanish football club

Bala Azul
- Full name: Club Deportivo Bala Azul
- Founded: 1948
- Ground: Playa Sol, Mazarrón, Region of Murcia, Spain
- Capacity: 4,500
- Chairman: (Spain) Domingo Paredes Martínez
- Manager: (Spain) Sergio Yufera
- League: Tercera Federación – Group 13
- 2025–26: Tercera Federación – Group 13, 11th of 18
Home colours	Away colours

Club Deportivo Bala Azul is a football team based in Mazarrón in the autonomous community of Region of Murcia. Founded in 1948, the team plays in Tercera Federación – Group 13. Their stadium is the Estadio Playa Sol, which has a capacity of 4,500.

In 1996, the club merged with Mazarrón CF, becoming Playas de Mazarrón CF. However, in the following year, the fusion was undone mainly due to the high rivalry between both sides.

== Season to season ==
Season	Tier	Division	Place	Copa del Rey
1969–70	5	2ª Reg.	11th	
1970–71	5	2ª Reg.	6th	
1971–72	6	2ª Reg.	4th	
1972–73	6	2ª Reg.	4th	
1973–74	6	2ª Reg.	5th	
1974–75	5	1ª Reg.	14th	
1975–76	5	1ª Reg.	13th	
1976–77	5	1ª Reg.	15th	
1977–78	6	1ª Reg.	4th	
1978–79	5	Reg. Pref.	20th	
1979–80	5	Reg. Pref.	18th	
1980–81	5	Reg. Pref.	16th	
1981–82	5	Reg. Pref.	11th	
1982–83	5	Reg. Pref.	11th	
1983–84	5	Reg. Pref.	10th	
1984–85	5	Reg. Pref.	15th	
1985–86	5	Reg. Pref.	18th	
1986–87	6	1ª Reg.	(R)	
1987–88	6	1ª Reg.	16th	
1988–89	6	1ª Reg.	6th	

Season	Tier	Division	Place	Copa del Rey
1989–90	6	1ª Reg.	4th	
1990–91	5	Reg. Pref.	19th	
1991–92	6	1ª Reg.	2nd	
1992–93	5	Reg. Pref.	2nd	
1993–94	4	3ª	18th	
1994–95	5	Reg. Pref.	5th	
1995–96	5	Reg. Pref.	12th	
1996–97	DNP			
1997–98	5	Terr. Pref.	15th	
1998–99	5	Terr. Pref.	3rd	
1999–2000	4	3ª	11th	
2000–01	4	3ª	9th	
2001–02	4	3ª	8th	
2002–03	4	3ª	10th	
2003–04	4	3ª	15th	
2004–05	4	3ª	20th	
2005–06	5	Terr. Pref.	1st	
2006–07	4	3ª	17th	
2007–08	4	3ª	17th	
2008–09	4	3ª	14th	

Season	Tier	Division	Place	Copa del Rey
2009–10	4	3ª	17th	
2010–11	4	3ª	6th	
2011–12	4	3ª	8th	
2012–13	4	3ª	16th	
2013–14	5	Pref. Aut.	11th	
2014–15	5	Pref. Aut.	12th	
2015–16	5	Pref. Aut.	15th	
2016–17	5	Pref. Aut.	2nd	
2017–18	4	3ª	20th	
2018–19	5	Pref. Aut.	7th	
2019–20	5	Pref. Aut.	10th	
2020–21	5	Pref. Aut.	2nd	
2021–22	5	3ª RFEF	14th	
2022–23	6	Pref. Aut.	8th	
2023–24	6	Pref. Aut.	2nd	
2024–25	5	3ª Fed.	10th	
2025–26	5	3ª Fed.	11th	
2026–27	5	3ª Fed.		

- 15 seasons in Tercera División
- 4 seasons in Tercera Federación/Tercera División RFEF
