= 2026–27 Tercera Federación =

Tercera Federación
- Season: 2026–27
- Dates: 5 September 2026 – 20 June 2027
- Teams: 324

The 2026–27 Tercera Federación season will be the sixth for the Tercera Federación, the national fifth level in the Spanish football league system. It will consist of 18 groups with 18 teams each.

== Competition format ==
- The group champions will be promoted to 2027–28 Segunda Federación.
- The champion of each group will qualify for the 2027–28 Copa del Rey. If the champion is a reserve team, the group's best-placed non-reserve team will qualify to the cup instead.
- Relegations to the regional leagues will depend on which clubs are relegated in the 2026–27 Segunda Federación, as well as the number of the promoted teams for the ensuing season.

== Overview before the season ==
A total of 324 teams will make up the league: one relegated from the 2025–26 Primera Federación (after suffering administrative relegation), 23 relegated from the 2025–26 Segunda Federación, 232 retained from the 2025–26 Tercera Federación, and 68 promoted from the regional divisions.

== Groups ==
=== Group 1 – Galicia ===
Teams retained from 2025–26 Tercera Federación

- Alondras
- Atlético Arteixo
- Barco
- Boiro
- Céltiga
- Estradense
- Gran Peña
- Montañeros
- Racing Villalbés
- Silva
- Somozas
- Viveiro

Teams relegated from 2025–26 Primera Federación

- Arenteiro (administrative relegation)

Teams relegated from 2025–26 Segunda Federación

- Sarriana
Location of teams of the 2026–27 Tercera Federación Group 1

Teams promoted from 2025–26 Preferente Futgal

- Antela
- Lalín
- Pontevedra B
- Portonovo

==== Teams and locations ====
Team	City	Home ground
Alondras	Cangas	O Morrazo
Antela	Xinzo de Limia	A Moreira
Arenteiro	O Carballiño	Espiñedo
Atlético Arteixo	Arteixo	Ponte dos Brozos
Barco	O Barco de Valdeorras	Calabagueiros
Boiro	Boiro	Barraña
Céltiga	A Illa de Arousa	Salvador Otero
Estradense	A Estrada	Municipal
Gran Peña	Vigo	Barreiro
Lalín	Lalín	Manuel Anxo Cortizo
Montañeros	A Coruña	Elviña Grande
Pontevedra B	Pontevedra	Campo de Fútbol A Xunqueira
Portonovo	Portonovo	Baltar
Racing Villalbés	Vilalba	A Magdalena
Sarriana	Sarria	Municipal de Ribela
Silva	A Coruña	A Grela
Somozas	As Somozas	Pardiñas
Viveiro	Viveiro	Cantarrana

==== League table ====
Pos	Team	Pld	W	D	L	GF	GA	GD	Pts	Qualification
1	Boiro	11	7	2	2	18	9	+9	23	Promotion to Segunda Federación and qualification for Copa del Rey
2	Silva	12	6	3	3	17	15	+2	21	Qualification for the promotion playoffs
3	Barco	11	5	4	2	16	10	+6	19	Qualification for the promotion playoffs
4	Sarriana	12	5	4	3	21	17	+4	19	Qualification for the promotion playoffs
5	Lalín	11	5	3	3	10	10	0	18	Qualification for the promotion playoffs
6	Atlético Arteixo	12	4	5	3	18	17	+1	17	
7	Antela	12	4	5	3	12	12	0	17	
8	Pontevedra B	11	5	1	5	16	12	+4	16	
9	Portonovo	11	4	3	4	15	13	+2	15	
10	Racing Villalbés	11	3	6	2	12	11	+1	15	
11	Estradense	11	4	3	4	17	19	−2	15	
12	Somozas	11	3	5	3	13	12	+1	14	
13	Céltiga	11	3	5	3	11	12	−1	14	
14	Alondras	11	3	3	5	13	15	−2	12	
15	Gran Peña	11	3	2	6	13	17	−4	11	Relegation to Preferente Futgal
16	Arenteiro	11	3	2	6	12	16	−4	11	Relegation to Preferente Futgal
17	Montañeros	11	3	0	8	13	23	−10	9	Relegation to Preferente Futgal
18	Viveiro	11	2	2	7	7	14	−7	8	Relegation to Preferente Futgal

Updated to match(es) played on 21 November 2026. Source:
Rules for classification: 1) points; 2) head-to-head points; 3) head-to-head goal difference; 4) goal difference; 5) number of goals scored

=== Group 2 – Asturias ===
Teams retained from 2025–26 Tercera Federación

- Avilés Stadium
- Caudal
- Ceares
- Colunga
- Covadonga
- Gijón Industrial
- L'Entregu
- Llanes
- Mosconia
- Praviano
- San Martín
- Siero
- Sporting Atlético

Teams relegated from 2025–26 Segunda Federación

- Langreo
- Lealtad

Teams promoted from 2025–26 Primera Asturfútbol

- Andés
- Astur
- Condal

==== Teams and locations ====
Location of the 2026–27 Tercera Federación Group 2

Team	City	Home ground
Andés	Andés	San Pedro
Astur	Oviedo	Hermanos Llana
Avilés Stadium	Avilés	Muro de Zaro
Caudal	Mieres	Hermanos Antuña
Ceares	Gijón	La Cruz
Colunga	Colunga	Santianes
Condal	Noreña	Alejandro Ortea
Covadonga	Oviedo	Juan Antonio Álvarez Rabanal
Gijón Industrial	Gijón	Santa Cruz
L'Entregu	El Entrego, San Martín del Rey Aurelio	Nuevo Nalón
Langreo	Langreo	Ganzábal
Lealtad	Villaviciosa	Les Caleyes
Llanes	Llanes	San José
Mosconia	Grado	Marqués de la Vega de Anzo
Praviano	Pravia	Santa Catalina
San Martín	Sotrondio, San Martín del Rey Aurelio	El Florán
Siero	Pola de Siero, Siero	El Bayu
Sporting Atlético	Gijón	Pepe Ortiz

==== League table ====
Pos	Team	Pld	W	D	L	GF	GA	GD	Pts	Qualification
1	Covadonga	11	8	2	1	29	11	+18	26	Promotion to Segunda Federación and qualification for Copa del Rey
2	Sporting Atlético	11	7	3	1	22	9	+13	24	Qualification for the promotion playoffs
3	Lealtad	12	6	3	3	16	7	+9	21	Qualification for the promotion playoffs
4	Condal	11	5	5	1	15	7	+8	20	Qualification for the promotion playoffs
5	Gijón Industrial	12	6	2	4	18	17	+1	20	Qualification for the promotion playoffs
6	Caudal	12	5	4	3	14	12	+2	19	
7	Praviano (Note: Praviano awarded a 0–3 victory in their Round 4 match against Langreo after the latter made an extra substitution during the match. The final score was originally 3–2.)	11	5	2	4	24	17	+7	17	
8	Mosconia	11	4	5	2	17	15	+2	17	
9	San Martín	11	4	4	3	14	15	−1	16	
10	Langreo	11	4	3	4	15	13	+2	15	
11	Colunga	11	4	3	4	19	25	−6	15	
12	Llanes	11	3	4	4	14	17	−3	13	
13	Siero	12	4	1	7	11	18	−7	13	
14	Avilés Stadium	11	3	3	5	9	14	−5	12	
15	Ceares	11	2	3	6	12	17	−5	9	
16	L'Entregu	11	2	2	7	8	19	−11	8	Relegation to Primera Asturfútbol
17	Astur	11	0	6	5	9	18	−9	6	Relegation to Primera Asturfútbol
18	Andés	11	0	3	8	9	24	−15	3	Relegation to Primera Asturfútbol

Updated to match(es) played on 21 November 2026. Source:
Rules for classification: 1) points; 2) head-to-head points; 3) head-to-head goal difference; 4) goal difference; 5) number of goals scored

=== Group 3 – Cantabria ===
Teams retained from 2025–26 Tercera Federación

- Atlético Albericia
- Barquereño
- Bezana
- Castro
- Cayón
- Escobedo
- Guarnizo
- Laredo
- Revilla
- Selaya
- Torina
- Tropezón
- Vimenor

Teams relegated from 2025–26 Segunda Federación

- Sámano

Teams promoted from 2025–26 Regional Preferente

- Atlético Mineros
- Naval
- Solares-Medio Cudeyo
- Velarde

==== Teams and locations ====
Location of teams of the 2026–27 Tercera Federación Group 3

Team	City	Home ground
Atlético Albericia	Santander	Juan Hormaechea
Atlético Mineros	Puente San Miguel	Reocín
Barquereño	San Vicente de la Barquera	El Castañar
Bezana	Santa Cruz de Bezana	Municipal
Castro	Castro Urdiales	Mioño
Cayón	Sarón	Fernando Astobiza
Escobedo	Escobedo, Camargo	Eusebio Arce
Guarnizo	Guarnizo, El Astillero	El Pilar
Laredo	Laredo	San Lorenzo
Naval	Reinosa	San Francisco
Revilla	Revilla, Camargo	El Crucero
Sámano	Sámano	Vallegón
Selaya	Selaya	El Castañal
Solares-Medio Cudeyo	Solares, Medio Cudeyo	La Estación
Torina	Bárcena de Pie de Concha	Municipal
Tropezón	Tanos, Torrelavega	Santa Ana
Velarde	Muriedas, Camargo	La Maruca
Vimenor	Vioño de Piélagos, Piélagos	La Vidriera

==== League table ====
Pos	Team	Pld	W	D	L	GF	GA	GD	Pts	Qualification
1	Revilla	12	8	3	1	28	13	+15	27	Promotion to Segunda Federación and qualification for Copa del Rey
2	Tropezón	11	8	2	1	22	8	+14	26	Qualification for the promotion playoffs
3	Vimenor	12	8	2	2	21	7	+14	26	Qualification for the promotion playoffs
4	Laredo	12	8	1	3	24	10	+14	25	Qualification for the promotion playoffs
5	Cayón	11	7	2	2	13	5	+8	23	Qualification for the promotion playoffs
6	Sámano	12	6	4	2	25	11	+14	22	
7	Bezana	12	6	3	3	21	15	+6	21	
8	Torina	12	3	7	2	13	9	+4	16	
9	Atlético Mineros	11	5	1	5	16	21	−5	16	
10	Atlético Albericia	12	2	5	5	15	19	−4	11	
11	Guarnizo	11	3	2	6	13	19	−6	11	
12	Selaya	12	3	2	7	8	18	−10	11	
13	Velarde	12	2	4	6	8	19	−11	10	
14	Solares-Medio Cudeyo	12	2	3	7	8	17	−9	9	
15	Naval	11	2	3	6	12	24	−12	9	Relegation to Regional Preferente
16	Castro	11	2	2	7	11	19	−8	8	Relegation to Regional Preferente
17	Barquereño	11	2	2	7	8	22	−14	8	Relegation to Regional Preferente
18	Escobedo	11	1	4	6	8	18	−10	7	Relegation to Regional Preferente

Updated to match(es) played on 21 November 2026. Source:
Rules for classification: 1) points; 2) head-to-head points; 3) head-to-head goal difference; 4) goal difference; 5) number of goals scored

=== Group 4 – Basque Country ===
Teams retained from 2025–26 Tercera Federación

- Alavés C
- Aretxabaleta
- Aurrerá Vitoria
- Cultural Durango
- Derio
- Eibar C
- Lagun Onak
- Leioa
- Pasaia
- Real Sociedad C
- San Ignacio
- Santurtzi
- Touring

Teams relegated from 2025–26 Segunda Federación

- Beasain

Teams promoted from 2025–26 División de Honor

- Amurrio
- Erandio
- Real Unión B
- Sodupe

==== Teams and locations ====
Location of teams of the 2026–27 Tercera Federación Group 4

Team	City	Home ground
Alavés C	Vitoria-Gasteiz	José Luis Compañón
Amurrio	Amurrio	Basarte
Aretxabaleta	Aretxabaleta	Ibarra
Aurrerá Vitoria	Vitoria-Gasteiz	Olaranbe
Beasain	Beasain	Loinaz
Cultural Durango	Durango	Tabira
Derio	Derio	Ibaiondo
Eibar C	Eibar	Unbe
Erandio	Erandio	Nuevo Ategorri
Lagun Onak	Azpeitia	Garmendipe
Leioa	Leioa	Sarriena
Pasaia	Pasaia	Don Bosco
Real Sociedad C	San Sebastián	José Luis Orbegozo
Real Unión B	Irun	Anexo del Stadium Gal
San Ignacio	Vitoria-Gasteiz	Adurtzabal
Santurtzi	Santurtzi	San Jorge
Sodupe	Sodupe, Güeñes	Lorenzo Hurtado de Saratxo
Touring	Errenteria	Fandería

==== League table ====
Pos	Team	Pld	W	D	L	GF	GA	GD	Pts	Qualification
1	Real Sociedad C	12	7	3	2	27	14	+13	24	Promotion to Segunda Federación
2	Alavés C	12	7	2	3	30	16	+14	23	Qualification for the promotion playoffs
3	Leioa	12	6	5	1	30	16	+14	23	Qualification for the promotion playoffs and Copa del Rey
4	Aurrerá Vitoria	12	7	2	3	18	17	+1	23	Qualification for the promotion playoffs
5	Cultural Durango	12	5	6	1	19	12	+7	21	Qualification for the promotion playoffs
6	Beasain	12	6	2	4	25	15	+10	20	
7	San Ignacio	12	5	3	4	19	13	+6	18	
8	Derio	11	5	3	3	15	13	+2	18	
9	Touring	12	5	3	4	15	15	0	18	
10	Aretxabaleta	11	5	2	4	14	16	−2	17	
11	Sodupe	11	5	2	4	8	15	−7	17	
12	Eibar C	12	5	1	6	19	21	−2	16	
13	Real Unión B	12	4	4	4	18	21	−3	16	
14	Lagun Onak	12	4	2	6	16	17	−1	14	
15	Pasaia	12	3	1	8	17	29	−12	10	Relegation to División de Honor
16	Santurtzi	11	3	0	8	7	14	−7	9	Relegation to División de Honor
17	Erandio	11	2	0	9	9	19	−10	6	Relegation to División de Honor
18	Amurrio	11	0	1	10	3	26	−23	1	Relegation to División de Honor

Updated to match(es) played on 21 November 2026. Source:
Rules for classification: 1) points; 2) head-to-head points; 3) head-to-head goal difference; 4) goal difference; 5) number of goals scored

=== Group 5 – Catalonia ===
Location of teams of the 2026–27 Tercera Federación Group 5
Location of teams of the 2026–27 Tercera Federación Group 5 (Province of Barcelona)

Teams retained from 2025–26 Tercera Federación

- Badalona
- Cerdanyola del Vallès
- Cornellà
- Europa B
- Grama
- L'Escala
- L'Hospitalet
- Mollerussa
- Montañesa
- Peralada
- San Cristóbal
- Tona
- Vilanova
- Vilassar de Mar

Teams relegated from 2025–26 Segunda Federación

- Atlètic Lleida

Teams promoted from 2025–26 Lliga Elit

- Martinenc
- Pobla de Mafumet
- San Juan Atlético Montcada

==== Teams and locations ====
Team	City	Home ground
Atlètic Lleida	Lleida	Ramon Farrús
Badalona	Badalona	Municipal de Badalona
Cerdanyola del Vallès	Cerdanyola del Vallès	Fontetes
Cornellà	Cornellà	Nou Estadi Municipal
Europa B	Barcelona	Nou Sardenya
Grama	Santa Coloma de Gramenet	Can Peixauet
L'Escala	L'Escala	Estadi Municipal
L'Hospitalet	L'Hospitalet de Llobregat	Municipal de l'Hospitalet de Llobregat
Martinenc	Barcelona	Guinardó
Mollerussa	Mollerussa	Camp Municipal
Montañesa	Barcelona	Nou Barris
Peralada	Peralada	Municipal de Peralada
Pobla de Mafumet	La Pobla de Mafumet	Municipal
San Cristóbal	Terrassa	Ca n'Anglada
San Juan Atlético Montcada	Montcada i Reixac	Can Sant Joan
Tona	Tona	Municipal
Vilanova	Vilanova i la Geltrú	Municipal
Vilassar de Mar	Vilassar de Mar	Xevi Ramón

==== League table ====
Pos	Team	Pld	W	D	L	GF	GA	GD	Pts	Qualification
1	Montañesa	11	6	2	3	15	7	+8	20	Promotion to Segunda Federación and qualification for Copa del Rey
2	Cerdanyola del Vallès	12	5	4	3	14	13	+1	19	Qualification for the promotion playoffs
3	Vilanova	11	5	4	2	14	13	+1	19	Qualification for the promotion playoffs
4	Atlètic Lleida	11	5	3	3	17	13	+4	18	Qualification for the promotion playoffs
5	L'Hospitalet	11	4	6	1	14	11	+3	18	Qualification for the promotion playoffs
6	Europa B	11	5	2	4	18	11	+7	17	
7	Badalona	11	5	2	4	17	12	+5	17	
8	Tona	11	5	2	4	9	9	0	17	
9	Grama	11	4	4	3	15	6	+9	16	
10	Pobla de Mafumet	11	5	1	5	15	13	+2	16	
11	San Juan Atlético Montcada	12	5	1	6	17	22	−5	16	
12	Cornellà	11	3	5	3	17	14	+3	14	
13	Peralada	11	3	5	3	13	12	+1	14	
14	Martinenc	11	3	3	5	19	25	−6	12	
15	Vilassar de Mar	11	3	3	5	14	20	−6	12	
16	Mollerussa	11	3	2	6	10	15	−5	11	Relegation to Lliga Elit
17	L'Escala	11	2	3	6	12	17	−5	9	Relegation to Lliga Elit
18	San Cristóbal	11	2	2	7	8	25	−17	8	Relegation to Lliga Elit

Updated to match(es) played on 21 November 2026. Source:
Rules for classification: 1) points; 2) head-to-head points; 3) head-to-head goal difference; 4) goal difference; 5) number of goals scored

=== Group 6 – Valencian Community ===
Teams retained from 2025–26 Tercera Federación

- Athletic Torrellano
- Atlético Levante
- Atlético Saguntino
- Atzeneta
- Buñol
- Crevillente
- Español San Vicente (Note: Jove Español San Vicente changed name to Español San Vicente in July 2026.)
- Hércules B
- Ontinyent 1931
- Roda
- Soneja
- Utiel (Note: Retained after Castellón B bought a vacant place in Segunda Federación.)
- Vall de Uxó
- Villarreal C

Teams relegated from 2025–26 Segunda Federación

- Torrent
Location of teams of the 2026–27 Tercera Federación Group 6

Teams promoted from 2025–26 Lliga Comunitat

- Acero
- Eldense B
- Torrevieja

==== Teams and locations ====
Team	City	Home ground
Acero	Sagunto	El Fornàs
Athletic Torrellano	Torrellano, Elche	Municipal
Atlético Levante	Valencia	Ciudad Deportiva de Buñol
Atlético Saguntino	Sagunto	Nou Camp de Morvedre
Atzeneta	Atzeneta d'Albaida	El Regit
Buñol	Buñol	Beltrán Báguena
Crevillente	Crevillent	Enrique Miralles
Eldense B	Elda	Anexo del Nuevo Pepico Amat
Español San Vicente	San Vicente del Raspeig	Ciudad Deportiva
Hércules B	Alicante	Juan Antonio Samaranch
Ontinyent 1931	Ontinyent	El Clariano
Roda	Villarreal	Pamesa Cerámica
Soneja	Soneja	El Arco
Torrent	Torrent	San Gregorio
Torrevieja	Torrevieja	Vicente García
Utiel	Utiel	La Celadilla
Vall de Uxó	La Vall d'Uixó	José Mangriñán
Villarreal C	Villarreal	Pamesa Cerámica

==== League table ====
Pos	Team	Pld	W	D	L	GF	GA	GD	Pts	Qualification
1	Villarreal C	12	9	0	3	18	10	+8	27	Promotion to Segunda Federación
2	Atlético Levante	11	6	4	1	17	4	+13	22	Qualification for the promotion playoffs
3	Hércules B	11	5	5	1	17	11	+6	20	Qualification for the promotion playoffs
4	Acero	12	4	6	2	12	9	+3	18	Qualification for the promotion playoffs and Copa del Rey
5	Vall de Uxó	11	4	5	2	15	8	+7	17	Qualification for the promotion playoffs
6	Crevillente	11	4	5	2	15	13	+2	17	
7	Atlético Saguntino	11	5	2	4	17	17	0	17	
8	Torrent	11	5	1	5	16	15	+1	16	
9	Buñol	11	4	4	3	13	14	−1	16	
10	Roda	11	4	3	4	15	16	−1	15	
11	Ontinyent 1931	12	4	2	6	16	16	0	14	
12	Eldense B	12	3	4	5	11	11	0	13	
13	Atzeneta	12	2	6	4	14	17	−3	12	
14	Athletic Torrellano	11	3	2	6	11	17	−6	11	
15	Soneja	12	3	2	7	11	19	−8	11	
16	Español San Vicente	11	2	4	5	12	19	−7	10	Relegation to Lliga Comunitat
17	Utiel	11	1	6	4	9	15	−6	9	Relegation to Lliga Comunitat
18	Torrevieja	11	2	3	6	10	18	−8	9	Relegation to Lliga Comunitat

Updated to match(es) played on 21 November 2026. Source:
Rules for classification: 1) points; 2) head-to-head points; 3) head-to-head goal difference; 4) goal difference; 5) number of goals scored

=== Group 7 – Community of Madrid ===
Teams retained from 2025–26 Tercera Federación

- Galapagar
- Las Rozas
- Leganés B
- México FC
- Móstoles URJC
- Pozuelo de Alarcón
- San Sebastián de los Reyes B
- Siello (Note: Retained after Real Madrid C bought a vacant place in Segunda Federación.)
- Torrejón
- Trival Valderas
- Unión Adarve

Teams relegated from 2025–26 Segunda Federación

- Fuenlabrada
- Moscardó
- Rayo Vallecano B
Location of teams of the 2026–27 Tercera Federación Group 7

Teams promoted from 2025–26 Primera Autonómica

- Cala Pozuelo
- Parla Escuela
- Rayo Ciudad Alcobendas
- Real Aranjuez

==== Teams and locations ====
Team	City	Home ground
Cala Pozuelo	Pozuelo de Alarcón	Municipal El Pradillo
Fuenlabrada	Fuenlabrada	Fernando Torres
Galapagar	Galapagar	El Chopo
Las Rozas	Las Rozas	Dehesa de Navalcarbón
Leganés B	Leganés	Instalación Deportiva Butarque
México FC	Paracuellos de Jarama	Municipal
Moscardó	Madrid	Román Valero
Móstoles URJC	Móstoles	El Soto
Parla Escuela	Parla	Las Américas
Pozuelo de Alarcón	Pozuelo de Alarcón	Valle de las Cañas
Rayo Ciudad Alcobendas	Alcobendas	Valdelasfuentes
Rayo Vallecano B	Madrid	Ciudad Deportiva
Real Aranjuez	Aranjuez	El Deleite
San Sebastián de los Reyes B	San Sebastián de los Reyes	Rafael Delgado Rosa
Siello	Madrid	Orcasitas
Torrejón	Torrejón de Ardoz	Las Veredillas
Trival Valderas	Alcorcón	La Canaleja
Unión Adarve	Madrid	Vicente del Bosque

==== League table ====
Pos	Team	Pld	W	D	L	GF	GA	GD	Pts	Qualification
1	Móstoles URJC	11	8	2	1	26	7	+19	26	Promotion to Segunda Federación and qualification for Copa del Rey
2	Moscardó	11	5	6	0	21	10	+11	21	Qualification for the promotion playoffs
3	Las Rozas	11	6	3	2	23	17	+6	21	Qualification for the promotion playoffs
4	Leganés B	11	5	3	3	24	14	+10	18	Qualification for the promotion playoffs
5	Galapagar	11	5	3	3	21	17	+4	18	Qualification for the promotion playoffs
6	Cala Pozuelo	11	5	2	4	16	16	0	17	
7	Unión Adarve	11	4	4	3	17	14	+3	16	
8	Fuenlabrada	11	4	4	3	16	13	+3	16	
9	Pozuelo de Alarcón	11	4	4	3	15	18	−3	16	
10	Real Aranjuez	12	4	4	4	18	22	−4	16	
11	Trival Valderas	11	3	6	2	15	14	+1	15	
12	Torrejón	11	4	2	5	17	11	+6	14	
13	Rayo Vallecano B	11	3	3	5	15	19	−4	12	
14	Parla Escuela	12	2	5	5	17	22	−5	11	
15	Rayo Ciudad Alcobendas	11	2	4	5	18	25	−7	10	Relegation to Primera Autonómica
16	San Sebastián de los Reyes B	11	2	2	7	16	29	−13	8	Relegation to Primera Autonómica
17	México FC	11	1	4	6	13	20	−7	7	Relegation to Primera Autonómica
18	Siello	11	2	1	8	9	29	−20	7	Relegation to Primera Autonómica

Updated to match(es) played on 21 November 2026. Source:
Rules for classification: 1) points; 2) head-to-head points; 3) head-to-head goal difference; 4) goal difference; 5) number of goals scored

=== Group 8 – Castile and León ===
Teams retained from 2025–26 Tercera Federación

- Almazán
- Arandina
- Atlético Bembibre
- Atlético Mansillés
- Colegios Diocesanos
- Cristo Atlético
- Guijuelo
- Júpiter Leonés
- La Virgen del Camino
- Mirandés B
- Palencia
- Santa Marta
- Unionistas B
- Villaralbo

Teams relegated from 2025–26 Segunda Federación

- Burgos Promesas

Teams promoted from 2025–26 Primera Regional

- Calasanz
- Salamanca B
- Turégano

==== Teams and locations ====
Location of teams of the 2026–27 Tercera Federación Group 8

Team	City	Home ground
Almazán	Almazán	La Arboleda
Arandina	Aranda de Duero	El Montecillo
Atlético Bembibre	Bembibre	La Devesa
Atlético Mansillés	Mansilla de las Mulas	La Caldera
Burgos Promesas	Burgos	Castañares
Calasanz	Soria	José Andrés Diago
Colegios Diocesanos	Ávila	Sancti Spiritu
Cristo Atlético	Palencia	Nueva Balastera
Guijuelo	Guijuelo	Municipal de Guijuelo
Júpiter Leonés	León	Puente Castro
La Virgen del Camino	La Virgen del Camino, Valverde de la Virgen	Los Dominicos
Mirandés B	Miranda de Ebro	Ence
Palencia	Palencia	Nueva Balastera
Salamanca UDS B	Salamanca	Pistas del Helmántico
Santa Marta	Santa Marta de Tormes	Alfonso San Casto
Turégano	Turégano	El Burgo
Unionistas B	Salamanca	Reina Sofía
Villaralbo	Villaralbo	Ciudad Deportiva Fernández Garcia

==== League table ====
Pos	Team	Pld	W	D	L	GF	GA	GD	Pts	Qualification
1	Cristo Atlético	12	8	3	1	17	6	+11	27	Promotion to Segunda Federación and qualification for Copa del Rey
2	Santa Marta	12	8	2	2	20	8	+12	26	Qualification for the promotion playoffs
3	La Virgen del Camino	12	7	2	3	16	13	+3	23	Qualification for the promotion playoffs
4	Atlético Mansillés	12	6	4	2	17	11	+6	22	Qualification for the promotion playoffs
5	Burgos Promesas	11	6	3	2	16	6	+10	21	Qualification for the promotion playoffs
6	Júpiter Leonés	11	6	3	2	14	7	+7	21	
7	Almazán	11	5	4	2	18	15	+3	19	
8	Palencia	11	5	2	4	16	11	+5	17	
9	Guijuelo	11	5	1	5	19	13	+6	16	
10	Atlético Bembibre	10	4	3	3	11	11	0	15	
11	Unionistas B	12	4	2	6	15	17	−2	14	
12	Villaralbo	12	3	4	5	18	19	−1	13	
13	Arandina	11	2	6	3	13	15	−2	12	
14	Turégano	11	2	5	4	12	14	−2	11	
15	Calasanz	12	2	2	8	12	26	−14	8	
16	Colegios Diocesanos	12	1	3	8	11	25	−14	6	Relegation to Primera Regional
17	Salamanca B	12	1	3	8	13	31	−18	6	Relegation to Primera Regional
18	Mirandés B	11	0	4	7	3	13	−10	4	Relegation to Primera Regional

Updated to match(es) played on 21 November 2026. Source:
Rules for classification: 1) points; 2) head-to-head points; 3) head-to-head goal difference; 4) goal difference; 5) number of goals scored

=== Group 9 – Eastern Andalusia and Melilla ===
Teams retained from 2025–26 Tercera Federación

- Alhaurino
- Arenas
- Atlético Mancha Real
- Atlético Porcuna
- Churriana
- Ciudad de Torredonjimeno
- Huétor Vega
- Marbellí
- Motril
- Recreativo Granada
- San Pedro
- Torre del Mar

Teams relegated from 2025–26 Segunda Federación

- Almería B
- Atlético Malagueño
- Melilla (Note: The relegation of Melilla prevents the promotion of Atlético Melilla, champions of the Primera Autonómica de Melilla.)
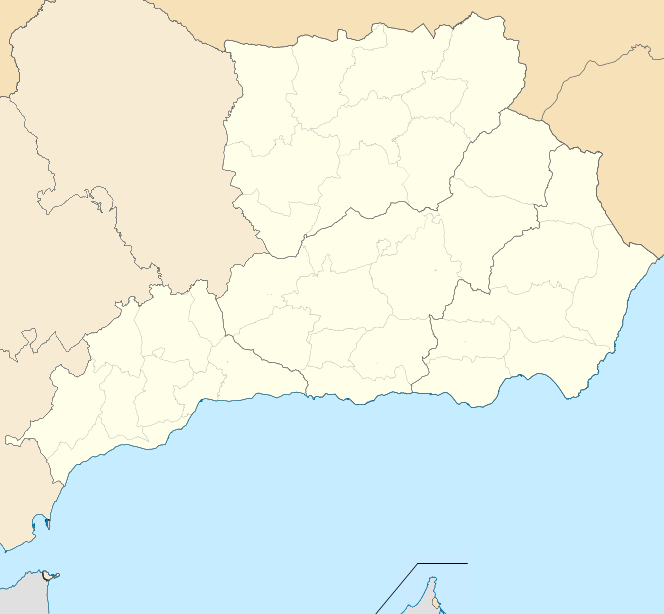
Location of teams of the 2026–27 Tercera Federación Group 9

Teams promoted from 2025–26 División de Honor

- Atlético Marbella
- Cantoria
- Málaga Juniors

==== Teams and locations ====
Team	City	Home ground
Alhaurino	Alhaurín El Grande	Miguel Fijones
Almería B	Almería	Anexo al Power Horse Stadium
Arenas	Armilla	Municipal
Atlético Malagueño	Málaga	Ciudad Deportiva
Atlético Marbella	Marbella	Luis Teruel
Atlético Mancha Real	Mancha Real	La Juventud
Atlético Porcuna	Porcuna	San Benito
Cantoria	Cantoria	Municipal Los Olivos
Churriana	Churriana de la Vega	El Frascuelo
Ciudad de Torredonjimeno	Torredonjimeno	Matías Prats
Huétor Vega	Huétor Vega	Las Viñas
Málaga Juniors	Málaga	Campo de la Federación Malagueña
Marbellí	Marbella	Antonio Naranjo
Melilla	Melilla	La Espiguera
Motril	Motril	Escribano Castilla
Recreativo Granada	Granada	Ciudad Deportiva
San Pedro	San Pedro de Alcántara	Municipal
Torre del Mar	Torre del Mar	Juan Manuel Azuaga

==== League table ====
Pos	Team	Pld	W	D	L	GF	GA	GD	Pts	Qualification
1	Melilla	11	8	2	1	19	7	+12	26	Promotion to Segunda Federación and qualification for Copa del Rey
2	Ciudad de Torredonjimeno	11	7	2	2	22	12	+10	23	Qualification for the promotion playoffs
3	Arenas	11	6	5	0	19	9	+10	23	Qualification for the promotion playoffs
4	Motril	11	5	5	1	15	10	+5	20	Qualification for the promotion playoffs
5	Atlético Malagueño	11	5	4	2	21	12	+9	19	Qualification for the promotion playoffs
6	Almería B	11	5	4	2	14	8	+6	19	
7	San Pedro	11	6	0	5	15	15	0	18	
8	Recreativo Granada	11	4	4	3	11	7	+4	16	
9	Churriana	11	4	3	4	15	11	+4	15	
10	Marbellí	11	4	3	4	8	9	−1	15	
11	Huétor Vega	11	3	4	4	14	18	−4	13	
12	Atlético Porcuna	11	3	4	4	13	20	−7	13	
13	Torre del Mar	11	3	3	5	9	11	−2	12	
14	Alhaurino	11	3	3	5	12	15	−3	12	
15	Atlético Mancha Real	11	1	5	5	8	16	−8	8	
16	Atlético Marbella	11	1	4	6	7	14	−7	7	Relegation to División de Honor
17	Cantoria	11	0	5	6	5	16	−11	5	Relegation to División de Honor
18	Málaga Juniors	11	1	0	10	7	24	−17	3	Relegation to División de Honor

Updated to match(es) played on 15 November 2026. Source:
Rules for classification: 1) points; 2) head-to-head points; 3) head-to-head goal difference; 4) goal difference; 5) number of goals scored

=== Group 10 – Western Andalusia and Ceuta ===
Teams retained from 2025–26 Tercera Federación

- Atlético Onubense
- Bollullos
- Cádiz Mirandilla
- Ceuta B (Note: The non-promotion of Ceuta B prevents the promotion of Ceuta 6 de Junio, the champions of the Regional Preferente de Ceuta.)
- Chiclana
- Conil
- Córdoba B
- Dos Hermanas
- Linense
- Pozoblanco
- San Roque Lepe
- Sevilla C (Note: Retained after Puente Genil took the place of La Unión Atlético in Segunda Federación.)
- Tomares
- Utrera

Teams relegated from 2025–26 Segunda Federación

- Xerez Deportivo
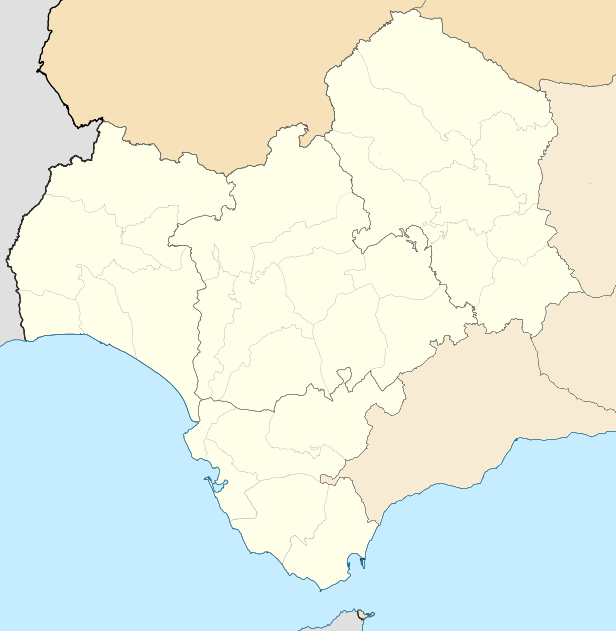
Location of teams of the 2026–27 Tercera Federación Group 10

Teams promoted from 2025–26 División de Honor

- Betis C
- Egabrense
- Racing Portuense

==== Teams and locations ====
Team	City	Home ground
Atlético Onubense	Huelva	Ciudad Deportiva
Betis C	Seville	Luis del Sol
Bollullos	Bollullos Par del Condado	Eloy Ávila Cano
Cádiz Mirandilla	Cádiz	Ramón Blanco Rodríguez
Ceuta B	Ceuta	Alfonso Murube
Chiclana	Chiclana de la Frontera	Municipal
Conil	Conil de la Frontera	José Antonio Pérez Ureba
Córdoba B	Córdoba	Rafael Gómez
Dos Hermanas	Dos Hermanas	Miguel Román García
Egabrense	Cabra	María Dolores Jiménez Guardeño
Linense	La Línea de la Concepción	Municipal de La Línea
Pozoblanco	Pozoblanco	Municipal
Racing Portuense	El Puerto de Santa María	José del Cuvillo
San Roque Lepe	Lepe	Ciudad de Lepe
Sevilla C	Seville	José Ramón Cisneros Palacios
Tomares	Tomares	Municipal San Sebastián
Utrera	Utrera	San Juan Bosco
Xerez Deportivo	Jerez de la Frontera	Chapín

==== League table ====
Pos	Team	Pld	W	D	L	GF	GA	GD	Pts	Qualification
1	Dos Hermanas	11	7	2	2	25	12	+13	23	Promotion to Segunda Federación and qualification for Copa del Rey
2	Betis C	12	7	2	3	29	19	+10	23	Qualification for the promotion playoffs
3	San Roque Lepe	11	7	2	2	17	10	+7	23	Qualification for the promotion playoffs
4	Racing Portuense	11	6	3	2	19	10	+9	21	Qualification for the promotion playoffs
5	Xerez Deportivo	11	5	4	2	14	11	+3	19	Qualification for the promotion playoffs
6	Utrera	11	6	1	4	17	20	−3	19	
7	Egabrense	11	5	2	4	20	17	+3	17	
8	Tomares	11	5	2	4	12	12	0	17	
9	Ceuta B	12	4	3	5	16	17	−1	15	
10	Pozoblanco	11	3	4	4	16	15	+1	13	
11	Linense	11	3	4	4	13	14	−1	13	
12	Chiclana	11	3	3	5	13	17	−4	12	
13	Conil	11	3	3	5	9	15	−6	12	
14	Cádiz Mirandilla	11	1	7	3	7	8	−1	10	
15	Córdoba B	10	2	4	4	11	13	−2	10	
16	Sevilla C	11	1	6	4	13	20	−7	9	Relegation to División de Honor
17	Atlético Onubense	12	2	2	8	9	24	−15	8	Relegation to División de Honor
18	Bollullos	11	1	4	6	10	16	−6	7	Relegation to División de Honor

Updated to match(es) played on 21 November 2026. Source:
Rules for classification: 1) points; 2) head-to-head points; 3) head-to-head goal difference; 4) goal difference; 5) number of goals scored

=== Group 11 – Balearic Islands ===
Teams retained from 2025–26 Tercera Federación

- Alcúdia
- Binissalem
- Cardassar
- Constància
- Formentera
- Inter Ibiza
- Llosetense
- Manacor
- Mercadal
- Platges de Calvià
- Santanyí

Teams relegated from 2025–26 Segunda Federación

- Andratx
- Ibiza Islas Pitiusas
- Porreres

Teams promoted from 2025–26 División de Honor

- Arenal
- Migjorn
- Sant Jordi
- Sineu

==== Teams and locations ====
Location of teams of the 2026–27 Tercera Federación Group 11

Team	City	Home ground
Alcúdia	Alcúdia	Els Arcs
Andratx	Andratx	Sa Plana
Arenal	S'Arenal de Llucmajor	Camp Municipal
Binissalem	Binissalem	Miquel Pons
Cardassar	Sant Llorenç des Cardassar	Es Moleter
Constància	Inca	Municipal
Formentera	Sant Francesc Xavier	Municipal
Ibiza Islas Pitiusas	Ibiza	Can Misses
Inter Ibiza	Ibiza	Can Cantó
Llosetense	Lloseta	Municipal
Manacor	Manacor	Na Capellera
Mercadal	Es Mercadal	San Martí
Migjorn	Es Migjorn Gran	Los Nogales
Platges de Calvià	Magaluf, Calvià	Municipal de Magaluf
Porreres	Porreres	Ses Forques
Sant Jordi	Sant Jordi de ses Salines, Sant Josep de sa Talaia	Kiko Serra
Santanyí	Santanyí	Municipal
Sineu	Sineu	Son Magí

==== League table ====
Pos	Team	Pld	W	D	L	GF	GA	GD	Pts	Qualification
1	Ibiza Islas Pitiusas	11	7	4	0	17	3	+14	25	Promotion to Segunda Federación and qualification for Copa del Rey
2	Platges de Calvià	12	8	0	4	22	11	+11	24	Qualification for the promotion playoffs
3	Constància	12	6	5	1	19	8	+11	23	Qualification for the promotion playoffs
4	Manacor	11	6	3	2	22	11	+11	21	Qualification for the promotion playoffs
5	Santanyí	12	5	5	2	18	10	+8	20	Qualification for the promotion playoffs
6	Sant Jordi	12	5	5	2	20	14	+6	20	
7	Porreres	11	6	1	4	16	11	+5	19	
8	Llosetense	12	6	1	5	12	12	0	19	
9	Alcúdia	12	6	0	6	18	19	−1	18	
10	Cardassar	11	5	2	4	19	14	+5	17	
11	Formentera	11	4	4	3	14	10	+4	16	
12	Binissalem	12	4	3	5	18	20	−2	15	
13	Sineu	12	4	2	6	13	19	−6	14	
14	Andratx	12	3	4	5	19	22	−3	13	
15	Mercadal	11	2	4	5	11	18	−7	10	Relegation to Regional
16	Migjorn	12	1	3	8	12	28	−16	6	Relegation to Regional
17	Arenal	12	1	2	9	7	24	−17	5	Relegation to Regional
18	Inter Ibiza	12	1	2	9	8	31	−23	5	Relegation to Regional

Updated to match(es) played on 21 November 2026. Source:
Rules for classification: 1) points; 2) head-to-head points; 3) head-to-head goal difference; 4) goal difference; 5) number of goals scored

=== Group 12 – Canary Islands ===
Location of teams of the 2026–27 Tercera Federación Group 12 – Province of Las Palmas
Location of teams of the 2026–27 Tercera Federación Group 12 – Province of Santa Cruz de Tenerife

Teams retained from 2025–26 Tercera Federación

- Lanzarote
- Las Palmas C
- Marino
- Mensajero
- Panadería Pulido
- Real Unión Tenerife
- San Bartolomé
- San Fernando
- San Miguel
- Tenerife C
- Unión Sur Yaiza
- Villa de Santa Brígida

Teams promoted from 2025–26 Interinsular Preferente

- Añaza
- Estrella
- Laguna
- Los Llanos de Aridane
- Playas de Sotavento
- Villaverde Norte

==== Teams and locations ====
Team	City	Home ground
Añaza	Santa Cruz de Tenerife	María José Pérez González
Estrella	Santa Lucía de Tirajana	Las Palmitas
Laguna	San Cristóbal de La Laguna	Francisco Peraza
Lanzarote	Arrecife	Ciudad Deportiva
Las Palmas C	Las Palmas	Anexo Gran Canaria
Los Llanos de Aridane	Los Llanos de Aridane	Aceró
Marino	Los Cristianos, Arona	Antonio Domínguez Alfonso
Mensajero	Santa Cruz de La Palma	Silvestre Carillo
Panadería Pulido	Vega de San Mateo	San Mateo
Playas de Sotavento	Pájara	Morro Jable
Real Unión Tenerife	Santa Cruz de Tenerife	Municipal de la Salud
San Bartolomé	San Bartolomé	Municipal Pedro Espinosa de León
San Fernando	Maspalomas	Ciudad Deportiva
San Miguel	San Miguel de Abona	Paco Tejera
Tenerife C	Santa Cruz de Tenerife	Centro Insular
Unión Sur Yaiza	Yaiza	Municipal
Villa de Santa Brígida	Santa Brígida	El Guiniguada
Villaverde Norte	Villaverde, La Oliva	Doña Julita

==== League table ====
Pos	Team	Pld	W	D	L	GF	GA	GD	Pts	Qualification
1	San Fernando	12	9	2	1	26	7	+19	29	Promotion to Segunda Federación and qualification for Copa del Rey
2	Panadería Pulido	12	8	2	2	34	16	+18	26	Qualification for the promotion playoffs
3	San Miguel	12	8	2	2	25	10	+15	26	Qualification for the promotion playoffs
4	Real Unión Tenerife	12	8	2	2	18	10	+8	26	Qualification for the promotion playoffs
5	Las Palmas C	12	5	4	3	23	16	+7	19	Qualification for the promotion playoffs
6	Unión Sur Yaiza	11	6	1	4	19	12	+7	19	
7	Marino	12	4	4	4	20	15	+5	16	
8	Los Llanos de Aridane	11	5	1	5	16	13	+3	16	
9	Estrella	12	5	1	6	14	20	−6	16	
10	Tenerife C	11	4	3	4	17	16	+1	15	
11	San Bartolomé	12	3	4	5	17	20	−3	13	
12	Mensajero	11	3	4	4	13	19	−6	13	
13	Villa de Santa Brígida	12	3	4	5	11	18	−7	13	
14	Lanzarote	11	2	6	3	11	14	−3	12	
15	Añaza	12	3	3	6	13	23	−10	12	Relegation to Interinsular Preferente
16	Playas de Sotavento	12	1	4	7	10	28	−18	7	Relegation to Interinsular Preferente
17	Laguna	11	1	3	7	13	24	−11	6	Relegation to Interinsular Preferente
18	Villaverde Norte	12	1	2	9	8	27	−19	5	Relegation to Interinsular Preferente

Updated to match(es) played on 21 November 2026. Source:
Rules for classification: 1) points; 2) head-to-head points; 3) head-to-head goal difference; 4) goal difference; 5) number of goals scored

=== Group 13 – Region of Murcia ===
Teams retained from 2025–26 Tercera Federación

- Águilas B
- Atlético Pulpileño
- Atlético Santa Cruz
- Bala Azul
- Cartagena B
- Deportivo Marítimo
- Cotillas (Note: Bought the place of El Palmar in July 2026.)
- Mazarrón
- Minerva
- Olímpico Totana
- Santomera
- UCAM Murcia B
- Unión Molinense
Location of teams of the 2026–27 Tercera Federación Group 13

Teams promoted from 2025–26 Preferente Autonómica

- Alcantarilla
- Algar
- Bullas Deportivo
- Los Garres
- San Javier

==== Teams and locations ====
Team	City	Home ground
Águilas B	Águilas	El Rubial
Alcantarilla	Alcantarilla	Ángel Sornichero
Algar	El Algar, Cartagena	Sánchez Luengo
Atlético Pulpileño	Pulpí (Andalusia)	San Miguel
Atlético Santa Cruz	Murcia	La Peñeta
Bala Azul	Mazarrón	Playa Sol
Bullas Deportivo	Bullas	Nicolás de las Peñas
Cartagena B	Cartagena	Ciudad Jardín
Cotillas	Las Torres de Cotillas	Onofre Fernández Verdú
Deportivo Marítimo	Cartagena	Mundial 82
Los Garres	Murcia	Las Tejeras
Mazarrón	Mazarrón	Municipal
Minerva	Alumbres, Cartagena	El Secante
Olímpico Totana	Totana	Juan Cayuela
San Javier	San Javier	Pitín
Santomera	Santomera	El Limonar
UCAM Murcia B	Sangonera la Verde	El Mayayo
Unión Molinense	Molina de Segura	Sánchez Cánovas

==== League table ====
Pos	Team	Pld	W	D	L	GF	GA	GD	Pts	Qualification
1	Santomera	11	8	2	1	24	12	+12	26	Promotion to Segunda Federación and qualification for Copa del Rey
2	Águilas B	11	6	5	0	19	6	+13	23	Qualification for the promotion playoffs
3	Atlético Santa Cruz	11	6	3	2	17	13	+4	21	Qualification for the promotion playoffs
4	San Javier	11	5	5	1	17	13	+4	20	Qualification for the promotion playoffs
5	Alcantarilla	11	5	3	3	18	10	+8	18	Qualification for the promotion playoffs
6	Unión Molinense	11	5	3	3	19	14	+5	18	
7	Bala Azul	11	4	5	2	15	10	+5	17	
8	UCAM Murcia B	11	4	3	4	18	13	+5	15	
9	Atlético Pulpileño	11	4	3	4	17	16	+1	15	
10	Olímpico Totana	11	4	3	4	14	14	0	15	
11	Los Garres	11	4	3	4	12	12	0	15	
12	Deportivo Marítimo	11	4	1	6	13	19	−6	13	
13	Cartagena B	11	2	5	4	16	19	−3	11	
14	Minerva	11	3	2	6	7	14	−7	11	
15	Mazarrón	11	3	1	7	17	19	−2	10	Relegation to Preferente Autonómica
16	Cotillas	11	3	1	7	10	16	−6	10	Relegation to Preferente Autonómica
17	Algar	11	3	0	8	7	24	−17	9	Relegation to Preferente Autonómica
18	Bullas Deportivo	11	1	2	8	10	26	−16	5	Relegation to Preferente Autonómica

Updated to match(es) played on 18 November 2026. Source:
Rules for classification: 1) points; 2) head-to-head points; 3) head-to-head goal difference; 4) goal difference; 5) number of goals scored

=== Group 14 – Extremadura ===
Teams retained from 2025–26 Tercera Federación

- Atlético Pueblonuevo
- Azuaga
- Cabeza del Buey
- Gévora
- Jaraíz
- Jerez
- Llerenense
- Montijo
- Moralo
- Puebla de la Calzada
- Santa Amalia
- Villafranca
- Villanovense
Location of teams of the 2026–27 Tercera Federación Group 14

Teams promoted from 2025–26 Primera División Extremeña

- Castuera
- Guadiana
- Plasencia
- Quintana
- Zafra

==== Teams and locations ====
Team	City	Home ground
Atlético Pueblonuevo	Pueblonuevo del Guadiana	Antonio Amaya
Azuaga	Azuaga	Municipal
Cabeza del Buey	Cabeza del Buey	Municipal
Castuera	Castuera	Manuel Ruiz
Gévora	Gévora, Badajoz	Municipal
Guadiana	Guadiana	Ernesto Sánchez Millán
Jaraíz	Jaraíz de la Vera	Municipal
Jerez	Jerez de los Caballeros	Manuel Calzado Galván
Llerenense	Llerena	Fernando Robina
Montijo	Montijo	Municipal
Moralo	Navalmoral de la Mata	Municipal
Plasencia	Plasencia	Ciudad Deportiva
Puebla de la Calzada	Puebla de la Calzada	Municipal
Quintana	Quintana de la Serena	Municipal
Santa Amalia	Santa Amalia	Municipal
Villafranca	Villafranca de los Barros	Municipal
Villanovense	Villanueva de la Serena	Romero Cuerda
Zafra	Zafra	Nuevo Estadio

==== League table ====
Pos	Team	Pld	W	D	L	GF	GA	GD	Pts	Qualification
1	Azuaga	11	8	2	1	21	8	+13	26	Promotion to Segunda Federación and qualification for Copa del Rey
2	Castuera	11	7	2	2	19	6	+13	23	Qualification for the promotion playoffs
3	Llerenense	11	6	5	0	13	5	+8	23	Qualification for the promotion playoffs
4	Villanovense	11	6	3	2	15	5	+10	21	Qualification for the promotion playoffs
5	Moralo	11	6	3	2	16	12	+4	21	Qualification for the promotion playoffs
6	Puebla de la Calzada	12	6	2	4	20	13	+7	20	
7	Jaraíz	11	4	3	4	16	12	+4	15	
8	Gévora	11	4	3	4	17	18	−1	15	
9	Jerez	11	4	3	4	13	15	−2	15	
10	Quintana	11	3	5	3	11	10	+1	14	
11	Villafranca	11	4	2	5	18	18	0	14	
12	Zafra	11	3	4	4	14	12	+2	13	
13	Cabeza del Buey	11	3	4	4	15	15	0	13	
14	Santa Amalia	11	2	6	3	13	12	+1	12	
15	Plasencia	11	2	5	4	11	17	−6	11	
16	Montijo	11	2	2	7	8	17	−9	8	Relegation to Primera Extremeña
17	Atlético Pueblonuevo	11	0	5	6	12	27	−15	5	Relegation to Primera Extremeña
18	Guadiana	12	0	1	11	4	34	−30	1	Relegation to Primera Extremeña

Updated to match(es) played on 21 November 2026. Source:
Rules for classification: 1) points; 2) head-to-head points; 3) head-to-head goal difference; 4) goal difference; 5) number of goals scored

=== Group 15 – Navarre ===
Location of teams of the 2026–27 Tercera Federación Group 15
Location of teams of the 2026–27 Tercera Federación Group 15 (Cuenca de Pamplona)

Teams retained from 2025–26 Tercera Federación

- Aoiz
- Avance
- Beti Kozkor
- Beti Onak
- Bidezarra
- Cirbonero
- Cortes
- Huarte
- Izarra
- Pamplona
- San Juan
- Subiza
- Txantrea
- Valle de Egüés

Teams relegated from 2025–26 Segunda Federación

- Mutilvera

Teams promoted from 2025–26 Primera Autonómica

- Cantolagua
- Doneztebe
- Gazte Berriak

==== Teams and locations ====
Team	City	Home ground
Aoiz	Agoitz	San Miguel
Avance	Ezcabarte	Igueldea
Beti Kozkor	Lekunberri	Plazaola
Beti Onak	Villava	Lorenzo Goikoa
Bidezarra	Noáin	Municipal El Soto
Cantolagua	Sangüesa	Cantolagua
Cirbonero	Cintruénigo	San Juan
Cortes	Cortes	San Francisco Javier
Doneztebe	Doneztebe	Iñaki Indart
Gazte Berriak	Ansoáin	Idaki
Huarte	Huarte/Uharte	Areta
Izarra	Estella-Lizarra	Merkatondoa
Mutilvera	Aranguren	Valle Aranguren
Pamplona	Pamplona	Bidezarra
San Juan	Pamplona	San Juan
Subiza	Subiza	Sotoburu
Txantrea	Pamplona	Txantrea
Valle de Egüés	Egüés	Sarriguren

==== League table ====
Pos	Team	Pld	W	D	L	GF	GA	GD	Pts	Qualification
1	Izarra	12	10	2	0	36	8	+28	32	Promotion to Segunda Federación and qualification for Copa del Rey
2	Mutilvera	12	7	5	0	22	6	+16	26	Qualification for the promotion playoffs
3	Subiza	11	6	1	4	21	16	+5	19	Qualification for the promotion playoffs
4	Gazte Berriak	12	5	4	3	15	11	+4	19	Qualification for the promotion playoffs
5	Valle de Egüés	12	5	4	3	18	15	+3	19	Qualification for the promotion playoffs
6	Avance	12	5	2	5	16	12	+4	17	
7	Txantrea	12	4	5	3	15	14	+1	17	
8	Beti Kozkor	12	5	2	5	13	18	−5	17	
9	Doneztebe	12	4	4	4	21	14	+7	16	
10	San Juan	12	4	4	4	21	15	+6	16	
11	Aoiz	12	3	5	4	14	15	−1	14	
12	Cirbonero	12	3	4	5	6	15	−9	13	
13	Cortes	12	3	3	6	8	19	−11	12	
14	Cantolagua	12	4	0	8	8	27	−19	12	
15	Beti Onak	12	2	5	5	13	20	−7	11	
16	Huarte	12	1	7	4	10	15	−5	10	Relegation to Primera Autonómica
17	Pamplona	11	2	4	5	8	15	−7	10	Relegation to Primera Autonómica
18	Bidezarra	12	1	5	6	11	21	−10	8	Relegation to Primera Autonómica

Updated to match(es) played on 21 November 2026. Source:
Rules for classification: 1) points; 2) head-to-head points; 3) head-to-head goal difference; 4) goal difference; 5) number of goals scored

=== Group 16 – La Rioja ===
Location of teams of the 2026–27 Tercera Federación Group 16
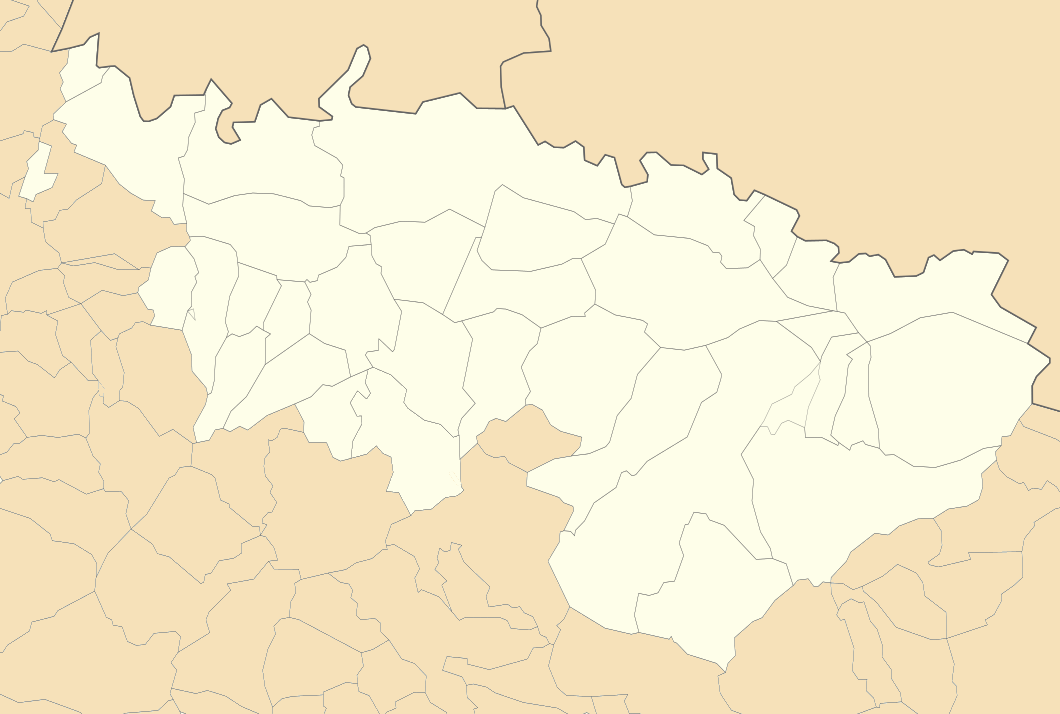
Location of teams of the 2026–27 Tercera Federación Group 16 – Comarca de Logroño

Teams retained from 2025–26 Tercera Federación

- Agoncillo
- Anguiano
- Atlético Vianés
- Berceo
- Calahorra
- Comillas
- Haro
- La Calzada
- Oyonesa
- Pradejón
- San Marcial
- Varea
- Yagüe

Teams relegated from 2025–26 Segunda Federación

- Alfaro

Teams promoted from 2025–26 Regional Preferente

- Calasancio
- Casalarreina
- Cenicero
- River Ebro

==== Teams and locations ====
Team	City	Home ground
Agoncillo	Agoncillo	San Roque
Alfaro	Alfaro	La Molineta
Anguiano	Anguiano	Isla
Atlético Vianés	Viana (Navarre)	Municipal
Berceo	Logroño	La Isla
Calahorra	Calahorra	La Planilla
Calasancio	Logroño	La Estrella
Casalarreina	Casalarreina	El Soto
Cenicero	Cenicero	Las Viñas
Comillas	Logroño	Mundial 82
Haro	Haro	El Mazo
La Calzada	Santo Domingo de La Calzada	El Rollo
Oyonesa	Oyón (Basque Country)	El Espinar
Pradejón	Pradejón	Municipal
River Ebro	Rincón de Soto	San Miguel
San Marcial	Lardero	Ángel de Vicente
Varea	Varea, Logroño	Municipal
Yagüe	Logroño	El Salvador

==== League table ====
Pos	Team	Pld	W	D	L	GF	GA	GD	Pts	Qualification
1	Haro	11	9	1	1	27	15	+12	28	Promotion to Segunda Federación and qualification for Copa del Rey
2	La Calzada	11	9	0	2	19	13	+6	27	Qualification for the promotion playoffs
3	Calahorra	11	8	0	3	33	13	+20	24	Qualification for the promotion playoffs
4	Alfaro	11	7	2	2	15	9	+6	23	Qualification for the promotion playoffs
5	Anguiano	12	6	3	3	22	11	+11	21	Qualification for the promotion playoffs
6	Agoncillo	12	5	5	2	26	15	+11	20	
7	Oyonesa	11	6	2	3	18	11	+7	20	
8	Varea	11	5	4	2	12	9	+3	19	
9	Berceo	12	6	1	5	24	18	+6	19	
10	San Marcial	11	4	4	3	13	9	+4	16	
11	Pradejón	12	4	1	7	10	21	−11	13	
12	Yagüe	11	4	0	7	15	25	−10	12	
13	Calasancio	11	3	2	6	13	21	−8	11	
14	Cenicero	11	2	3	6	12	19	−7	9	
15	River Ebro	11	2	2	7	10	22	−12	8	
16	Atlético Vianés	11	2	1	8	14	21	−7	7	Relegation to Regional Preferente
17	Comillas	11	1	3	7	8	19	−11	6	Relegation to Regional Preferente
18	Casalarreina	11	1	0	10	10	30	−20	3	Relegation to Regional Preferente

Updated to match(es) played on 21 November 2026. Source:
Rules for classification: 1) points; 2) head-to-head points; 3) head-to-head goal difference; 4) goal difference; 5) number of goals scored

=== Group 17 – Aragon ===
Location of teams of the 2026–27 Tercera Federación Group 17

Teams retained from 2025–26 Tercera Federación

- Almudévar
- Andorra
- Atlético Monzón
- Belchite 97
- Binéfar
- Caspe
- Cuarte
- Épila
- Huesca B
- Illueca
- La Almunia
- Robres
- Tamarite

Teams relegated from 2025–26 Segunda Federación

- Deportivo Aragón
- Ejea

Teams promoted from 2025–26 Regional Preferente

- Brea
- Fraga
- Internacional Huesca

==== Teams and locations ====
Team	City	Home ground
Almudévar	Almudévar	La Corona
Andorra	Andorra	Juan Antonio Endeiza
Atlético Monzón	Monzón	Isidro Calderón
Belchite 97	Belchite	Municipal
Binéfar	Binéfar	Los Olmos
Brea	Brea de Aragón	Piedrabuena
Caspe	Caspe	Los Rosales
Cuarte	Cuarte de Huerva	Nuevo Municipal
Deportivo Aragón	Zaragoza	Ciudad Deportiva
Épila	Épila	La Huerta
Ejea	Ejea de los Caballeros	Luchán
Fraga	Fraga	La Estacada
Huesca B	Huesca	San Jorge
Illueca	Illueca	Papa Luna
Internacional Huesca	Huesca	Huesca-Universidad
La Almunia	La Almunia de Doña Godina	Tenerías
Robres	Robres	San Blas
Tamarite	Tamarite de Litera	La Colomina

==== League table ====
Pos	Team	Pld	W	D	L	GF	GA	GD	Pts	Qualification
1	Deportivo Aragón	11	7	3	1	22	8	+14	24	Promotion to Segunda Federación
2	Ejea	11	6	3	2	20	14	+6	21	Qualification for the promotion playoffs and Copa del Rey
3	Cuarte	11	5	4	2	20	12	+8	19	Qualification for the promotion playoffs
4	Caspe	11	4	6	1	19	13	+6	18	Qualification for the promotion playoffs
5	Brea	11	5	3	3	13	8	+5	18	Qualification for the promotion playoffs
6	Huesca B	11	4	5	2	12	7	+5	17	
7	La Almunia	11	5	2	4	14	13	+1	17	
8	Atlético Monzón	12	4	5	3	18	21	−3	17	
9	Almudévar	11	4	3	4	11	10	+1	15	
10	Fraga	11	4	3	4	11	11	0	15	
11	Binéfar	11	3	5	3	18	17	+1	14	
12	Internacional Huesca	11	3	4	4	15	16	−1	13	
13	Épila	11	2	6	3	8	9	−1	12	
14	Andorra	11	3	3	5	12	18	−6	12	
15	Illueca	11	3	2	6	13	17	−4	11	
16	Robres	11	1	6	4	13	19	−6	9	Relegation to Regional Preferente
17	Tamarite	11	3	0	8	15	25	−10	9	Relegation to Regional Preferente
18	Belchite 97	12	0	5	7	8	24	−16	5	Relegation to Regional Preferente

Updated to match(es) played on 21 November 2026. Source:
Rules for classification: 1) points; 2) head-to-head points; 3) head-to-head goal difference; 4) goal difference; 5) number of goals scored

=== Group 18 – Castilla–La Mancha ===
Teams retained from 2025–26 Tercera Federación

- Guadalajara B
- Huracán Balazote
- Illescas
- La Solana
- Manchego
- Marchamalo
- San Clemente
- Tarancón
- Toledo
- Villacañas
- Villarrobledo
- Villarrubia

Teams relegated from 2025–26 Segunda Federación

- Quintanar del Rey
- Socuéllamos
Location of teams of the 2026–27 Tercera Federación Group 18

Teams promoted from 2025–26 Primera Autonómica Preferente

- Almansa
- Noblejas
- Torrijos
- Villa

==== Teams and locations ====
Team	City	Home ground
Almansa	Almansa	Paco Simón
Guadalajara B	Guadalajara	Fuente de la Niña
Huracán Balazote	Balazote	Municipal de Barrax
Illescas	Illescas	Municipal
La Solana	La Solana	La Moheda
Manchego	Ciudad Real	Juan Carlos I
Marchamalo	Marchamalo	La Solana
Noblejas	Noblejas	Municipal Ángel Luengo
Quintanar del Rey	Quintanar del Rey	San Marcos
San Clemente	San Clemente	Municipal
Socuéllamos	Socuéllamos	Paquito Giménez
Tarancón	Tarancón	Municipal
Toledo	Toledo	Salto del Caballo
Torrijos	Torrijos	San Francisco
Villa	Villa de Don Fadrique	Gregorio Vela
Villacañas	Villacañas	Las Pirámides
Villarrobledo	Villarrobledo	Nuestra Señora de la Caridad
Villarrubia	Villarrubia de los Ojos	Nuevo Municipal

==== League table ====
Pos	Team	Pld	W	D	L	GF	GA	GD	Pts	Qualification
1	Manchego	12	10	0	2	22	9	+13	30	Promotion to Segunda Federación and qualification for Copa del Rey
2	Toledo	11	7	2	2	23	11	+12	23	Qualification for the promotion playoffs
3	Villacañas	11	6	3	2	20	10	+10	21	Qualification for the promotion playoffs
4	Villarrubia	12	5	4	3	18	14	+4	19	Qualification for the promotion playoffs
5	Villarrobledo	11	4	6	1	12	6	+6	18	Qualification for the promotion playoffs
6	San Clemente	11	5	3	3	20	18	+2	18	
7	Villa	11	6	0	5	16	15	+1	18	
8	Illescas	11	5	2	4	14	14	0	17	
9	Almansa	11	4	3	4	14	11	+3	15	
10	Tarancón	11	4	3	4	16	14	+2	15	
11	Noblejas	12	4	3	5	18	22	−4	15	
12	Torrijos	11	4	2	5	11	13	−2	14	
13	Socuéllamos	11	3	4	4	8	9	−1	13	
14	La Solana	11	4	0	7	9	12	−3	12	
15	Marchamalo	11	3	3	5	17	21	−4	12	
16	Huracán Balazote	11	3	1	7	12	23	−11	10	Relegation to Primera Autonómica Preferente
17	Quintanar del Rey	11	1	4	6	14	22	−8	7	Relegation to Primera Autonómica Preferente
18	Guadalajara B	12	0	3	9	9	29	−20	3	Relegation to Primera Autonómica Preferente

Updated to match(es) played on 21 November 2026. Source:
Rules for classification: 1) points; 2) head-to-head points; 3) head-to-head goal difference; 4) goal difference; 5) number of goals scored

== See also ==
- 2026–27 La Liga
- 2026–27 Segunda División
- 2026–27 Primera Federación
- 2026–27 Segunda Federación
