= José Miguel Morales =

Spanish footballer (born 1976)

Personal information
- Full name: José Miguel Morales Martínez
- Date of birth: 26 December 1976 (age 49)
- Place of birth: Barcelona, Spain
- Height: 1.90 m (6 ft 3 in)
- Position: Goalkeeper

Youth career
- Gramenet
- Damm
- Gramenet

Senior career*
Years	Team	Apps	(Gls)
1995–1996	Meridiana Torre Baró	21	(0)
1996–1997	Gramenet B	22	(0)
1997–1999	Santboià	47	(0)
1999–2000	Mataró	33	(0)
2000–2008	Terrassa	249	(0)
2008–2015	Sant Andreu	243	(0)
2015–2020	Badalona	156	(0)
Total		771	(0)

International career
2002–2008	Catalonia	5	(0)
- * Club domestic league appearances and goals

José Miguel Morales Martínez (born 26 December 1976) is a Spanish former professional footballer who played as a goalkeeper.

== Club career ==
Born in Barcelona, Catalonia, Morales spent his entire senior career in his region of birth. His professional input consisted of 101 Segunda División matches for Terrassa FC over three seasons, his debut in the competition taking place on 31 August 2002 when he replaced field player Juan Carlos early into a 1–1 home draw against Albacete Balompié after Fernando Maestro was sent off.

In the Segunda División B, other than Terrassa, Morales also represented UE Sant Andreu and CF Badalona, retiring well past his 40s. On 29 May 2020, when he only needed one more game to become the most veteran player to appear in that league, it was announced that he would be released by the latter club the following month.

== International career ==
Morales won five caps for the Catalonia regional team in six years.
