= Rui Santos =

Rui Santos may refer to:

- Rui Santos (archer) (born 1967), Portuguese archer
- Rui Santos (footballer) (born 1989), Portuguese footballer
