= Escario =

Escario is a Spanish surname. Notable people with the surname include:

- Escario family, a political family in the Philippines
- Jaime Escario (born 2003), Spanish footballer
- María Escario, (born 1959), Spanish journalist
- Nicolas Escario (1898–1958), Filipino Visayan physician, educator, and legislator
