= CD Atlético de Marbella Paraíso =

Association football club in Spain

Atlético Marbella
- Full name: Club Deportivo Atlético de Marbella Paraíso
- Nickname: Albicelestes
- Founded: 2010
- Ground: Luis Teruel; Marbella, Andalusia, Spain
- Capacity: 500
- President: Alessandro Gaucci
- Manager: Pepe Bermúdez
- League: Tercera Federación – Group 9
- 2025–26: División de Honor – Group 2, 5th of 16 (promoted via play-offs)
- Website: atleticodemarbella.com
Home colours	Away colours

Club Deportivo Atlético de Marbella Paraíso is a Spanish football club located in Marbella, in the autonomous community of Andalusia. Founded in 2010, they play in Tercera Federación – Group 9, holding home matches at Campo de Fútbol Luis Teruel, with a capacity of 500 spectators.

== History ==
Atlético Marbella was founded in 2010 by local supporters under the name of Club Deportivo Atlético de Marbella Balompié, as an attempt to honour the dissolved CA Marbella. In 2022, the club merged with Marbella Paraíso CF and was renamed Club Deportivo Atlético de Marbella Paraíso.

In August 2024, after River Melilla CF resigned from their Tercera Federación spot and FC Málaga City was promoted, Atlético Marbella were also promoted to División de Honor. On 31 May 2026, the club achieved a first-ever promotion to the fifth tier, after defeating UD Maracena in the promotion play-off finals.

== Season to season ==
Season	Tier	Division	Place	Copa del Rey
2010–11	7	2ª Reg.	5th	
2011–12	7	1ª Prov.	1st	
2012–13	6	Reg. Pref.	6th	
2013–14	6	Reg. Pref.	8th	
2014–15	6	2ª And.	8th	
2015–16	6	2ª And.	8th	
2016–17	6	1ª And.	4th	
2017–18	6	1ª And.	15th	
2018–19	6	1ª And.	4th	
2019–20	6	1ª And.	5th	
2020–21	6	1ª And.	5th	
2021–22	7	1ª And.	7th	
2022–23	7	1ª And.	1st	
2023–24	7	1ª And.	2nd	
2024–25	6	Div. Hon.	6th	
2025–26	6	Div. Hon.	5th	
2026–27	5	3ª Fed.		

- 1 season in Tercera Federación
