= CD Villa =

Spanish football club

Villa
- Full name: Club Deportivo Villa
- Founded: 1946
- Ground: Gregorio Vela, Villa de Don Fadrique, Castilla–La Mancha, Spain
- Capacity: 500
- President: Juan Comendador Mendoza
- Manager: Fausti Manzanero
- League: Primera Autonómica – Group 2
- 2024–25: Primera Autonómica – Group 2, 4th of 16
Home colours	Away colours

Club Deportivo Villa is a Spanish football team located in Villa de Don Fadrique, Toledo, in the autonomous community of Castilla–La Mancha. Founded in 1946, they play in Primera Autonómica – Group 2, holding home matches at Estadio Municipal Gregorio Vela, with a capacity of 500 spectators.

== History ==
Villa's history trace back to the year of 1946, with the club playing sporadically in regional divisions in the 1950s and 1960s before establishing a senior side from 1979 onwards. On 24 May 2026, the club achieved a first-ever promotion to Tercera Federación, after winning their Primera Autonómica Preferente group.

== Season to season ==
Season	Tier	Division	Place	Copa del Rey
1946–1961	—	Regional	—	
1961–62	7	3ª Reg.	3rd	
1962–1975	DNP			
1975–76	8	3ª Reg.	14th	
1976–77	DNP			
1977–78	DNP			
1978–79	DNP			
1979–80	9	3ª Reg.	10th	
1980–81	9	3ª Reg.	6th	
1981–82	9	3ª Reg.	12th	
1982–83	9	3ª Reg.	12th	
1983–84	9	3ª Reg.	2nd	
1984–85	8	3ª Reg. P.	3rd	
1985–86	8	3ª Reg. P.	11th	
1986–87	7	2ª Reg.	5th	
1987–88	7	2ª Reg.	5th	
1988–89	7	2ª Reg.	7th	
1989–90	7	2ª Reg.	9th	
1990–91	7	2ª Reg.	5th	
1991–92	7	2ª Reg.	1st	

Season	Tier	Division	Place	Copa del Rey
1992–93	6	1ª Reg.	7th	
1993–94	6	1ª Reg.	14th	
1994–95	6	1ª Reg.	10th	
1995–96	6	2ª Aut.	2nd	
1996–97	6	2ª Aut.	1st	
1997–98	6	2ª Aut.	2nd	
1998–99	6	2ª Aut.	2nd	
1999–2000	6	2ª Aut.	3rd	
2000–01	6	2ª Aut.	1st	
2001–02	5	1ª Aut.	18th	
2002–03	6	2ª Aut.	1st	
2003–04	5	1ª Aut.	18th	
2004–05	6	2ª Aut.	8th	
2005–06	6	2ª Aut.	4th	
2006–07	6	2ª Aut.	10th	
2007–08	7	2ª Aut.	9th	
2008–09	7	2ª Aut.	10th	
2009–10	7	2ª Aut.	13th	
2010–11	7	2ª Aut.	17th	
2011–12	7	2ª Aut.	7th	

Season	Tier	Division	Place	Copa del Rey
2012–13	7	2ª Aut.	6th	
2013–14	7	2ª Aut.	1st	
2014–15	6	1ª Aut.	6th	
2015–16	6	1ª Aut.	8th	
2016–17	6	1ª Aut.	7th	
2017–18	6	1ª Aut.	2nd	
2018–19	5	Aut. Pref.	17th	
2019–20	6	1ª Aut.	3rd	
2020–21	6	1ª Aut.	1st	
2021–22	6	Aut. Pref.	7th	
2022–23	6	Aut. Pref.	5th	
2023–24	6	Aut. Pref.	5th	
2024–25	6	Aut. Pref.	4th	
2025–26	6	Aut. Pref.	1st	
2026–27	5	3ª Fed.		

- 1 season in Tercera Federación
