= CD Quintana =

Association football team in Spain

Quintana
- Full name: Club Deportivo Quintana
- Founded: 1969
- Ground: Municipal, Quintana de la Serena, Extremadura, Spain
- Capacity: 1,000
- President: Agustín del Pozo
- Manager: Pedri Nogales
- League: Tercera Federación – Group 14
- 2025–26: Primera Extremeña – Group 3, 1st of 14 (champions)
Home colours	Away colours

Club Deportivo Quintana is a football team based in Quintana de la Serena, in the autonomous community of Extremadura. Founded in 1969, they play in Tercera Federación – Group 14, holding home matches at the Campo Municipal de Quintana de la Serena, with a capacity of 1,000 people.

== History ==
Unofficially established in the 1950s, Quintana entered the Extremaduran Football Federation in 1969, having Primitivo Sánchez as their first president. In 1983, the club achieved a first-ever promotion to Tercera División; despite finishing 11th in the Regional Preferente, the club was promoted due to the creation of a group exclusively composed of Extremaduran teams.

Quintana spent several seasons without a senior squad in the 21st century, and achieved a promotion to Primera Extremeña in May 2022.

== Season to season ==
Season	Tier	Division	Place	Copa del Rey
1970–71	5	2ª Reg. P.	7th	
1971–72	5	2ª Reg. P.	3rd	
1972–73	5	2ª Reg.	6th	
1973–74	5	2ª Reg.	7th	
1974–75	5	1ª Reg.	2nd	
1975–76	5	1ª Reg.	6th	
1976–77	5	1ª Reg.	5th	
1977–78	6	1ª Reg.	7th	
1978–79	6	1ª Reg.	9th	
1979–80	6	1ª Reg.	4th	
1980–81	5	Reg. Pref.	10th	
1981–82	5	Reg. Pref.	15th	
1982–83	5	Reg. Pref.	11th	
1983–84	4	3ª	19th	
1984–85	5	Reg. Pref.	17th	
1985–86	6	1ª Reg.	6th	
1986–87	6	1ª Reg.	13th	
1987–88	6	1ª Reg.	4th	
1988–89	6	1ª Reg.	5th	
1989–90	5	Reg. Pref.	6th	

Season	Tier	Division	Place	Copa del Rey
1990–91	5	Reg. Pref.	17th	
1991–92	5	Reg. Pref.	11th	
1992–93	5	Reg. Pref.	9th	
1993–94	5	Reg. Pref.	6th	
1994–95	5	Reg. Pref.	15th	
1995–96	5	Reg. Pref.	20th	
1996–97	6	1ª Reg.	2nd	
1997–98	5	Reg. Pref.	18th	
1998–99	6	1ª Reg.	7th	
1999–2000	DNP			
2000–01	6	1ª Reg.	9th	
2001–02	DNP			
2002–03	DNP			
2003–04	6	1ª Reg.	13th	
2004–05	DNP			
2005–06	DNP			
2006–07	6	1ª Reg.	7th	
2007–08	6	1ª Reg.	3rd	
2008–09	6	1ª Reg.	12th	
2009–10	6	1ª Reg.	14th	

Season	Tier	Division	Place	Copa del Rey
2010–2014	DNP			
2014–15	6	1ª Reg.	4th	
2015–16	5	Reg. Pref.	4th	
2016–17	5	1ª Ext.	5th	
2017–18	5	1ª Ext.	16th	
2018–19	6	2ª Ext.	3rd	
2019–20	6	2ª Ext.	4th	
2020–21	6	2ª Ext.	1st	
2021–22	7	2ª Ext.	1st	
2022–23	6	1ª Ext.	4th	
2023–24	6	1ª Ext.	3rd	
2024–25	6	1ª Ext.	6th	
2025–26	6	1ª Ext.	1st	
2026–27	5	3ª Fed.		

- 1 season in Tercera División
- 1 season in Tercera Federación
