= CD Cantoria 2017 FC =

Spanish football team

Cantoria
- Full name: Club Deportivo Cantoria 2017 Fútbol Club
- Founded: 2017
- Ground: Los Olivos, Cantoria, Andalusia, Spain
- Capacity: 1,000
- President: Ricardo Mora
- Manager: Ricardo Mora
- League: Tercera Federación – Group 9
- 2025–26: División de Honor – Group 2, 1st of 16 (champions)
Home colours	Away colours

Club Deportivo Cantoria 2017 Fútbol Club is a Spanish football team based in Cantoria, in the autonomous community of Andalusia. Founded in 2017, they play in Tercera Federación – Group 9, holding home matches at Campo Municipal Los Olivos, with a capacity of 1,000 people.

== History ==
Founded in 2017 as Club Deportivo Perla de Almanzora, Cantoria achieved two consecutive promotions in their first two seasons (the second one under the current name), reaching the División de Honor. On 6 April 2026, the club achieved a first-ever promotion to a national division, reaching the Tercera Federación after a 4–1 home win over CD Atlético de Marbella.

== Season to season ==
Season	Tier	Division	Place	Copa del Rey
2017–18	7	2ª And.	1st	
2018–19	6	1ª And.	2nd	
2019–20	5	Div. Hon.	14th	
2020–21	5	Div. Hon.	9th	
2021–22	6	Div. Hon.	7th	
2022–23	6	Div. Hon.	12th	
2023–24	6	Div. Hon.	9th	
2024–25	6	Div. Hon.	4th	
2025–26	6	Div. Hon.	1st	
2026–27	5	3ª Fed.		

- 1 season in Tercera Federación
