= UD Aretxabaleta =

Coordinates: 43.02870°N 2.5081°W

Aretxabaleta
- Full name: Unión Deportiva Aretxabaleta Kirol Elkartea
- Founded: 1946
- Ground: Ibarra, Aretxabaleta, Basque Country, Spain
- Capacity: 500
- President: Eduardo Altube
- Head coach: Juanan Cruz
- League: Tercera Federación – Group 4
- 2025–26: Tercera Federación – Group 4, 10th of 18
Home colours	Away colours

Unión Deportiva Aretxabaleta Kirol Elkartea, (Unión Deportiva Aretxabaleta (in Spanish) / Aretxabaleta Kirol Elkartea (in Basque)) is a Basque football team based in Aretxabaleta, in the autonomous community of Basque Country. Founded in 1946, it currently plays in Tercera Federación – Group 4, holding home matches at Estadio Ibarra, which has a capacity of 500 spectators.

== Season to season ==
Season	Tier	Division	Place	Copa del Rey
1946–47	5	2ª Reg.	5th	
1947–48	5	2ª Reg.	3rd	
1948–49	5	2ª Reg.	4th	
1949–50	5	2ª Reg.	3rd	
1950–51	5	2ª Reg.	1st	
1951–52	4	1ª Reg.	6th	
1952–53	4	1ª Reg.	10th	
1953–54	4	1ª Reg.	7th	
1954–55	4	1ª Reg.	1st	
1955–56	4	1ª Reg.	6th	
1956–57	4	1ª Reg.	4th	
1957–58	4	1ª Reg.	7th	
1958–59	4	1ª Reg.	11th	
1959–60	5	2ª Reg.	3rd	
1960–61	4	1ª Reg.	7th	
1961–62	4	1ª Reg.	13th	
1962–63	4	1ª Reg.	10th	
1963–64	4	1ª Reg.	16th	
1964–65	4	1ª Reg.	10th	
1965–66	4	1ª Reg.	9th	

Season	Tier	Division	Place	Copa del Rey
1966–67	4	1ª Reg.	4th	
1967–68	4	1ª Reg.	1st	
1968–69	4	1ª Reg.	14th	
1969–70	5	2ª Reg.	1st	
1970–71	4	1ª Reg.	2nd	
1971–72	4	1ª Reg.	1st	
1972–73	3	3ª	15th	
1973–74	4	1ª Reg.	3rd	
1974–75	4	Reg. Pref.	4th	
1975–76	4	Reg. Pref.	7th	
1976–77	4	Reg. Pref.	8th	
1977–78	5	Reg. Pref.	15th	
1978–79	5	Reg. Pref.	2nd	
1979–80	5	Reg. Pref.	1st	
1980–81	5	Reg. Pref.	3rd	
1981–82	5	Reg. Pref.	12th	
1982–83	5	Reg. Pref.	2nd	
1983–84	4	3ª	17th	
1984–85	5	Reg. Pref.	2nd	
1985–86	5	Reg. Pref.	2nd	

Season	Tier	Division	Place	Copa del Rey
1986–87	4	3ª	10th	
1987–88	4	3ª	20th	
1988–89	5	Reg. Pref.	5th	
1989–90	5	Reg. Pref.	14th	
1990–91	5	Reg. Pref.	7th	
1991–92	5	Reg. Pref.	5th	
1992–93	5	Reg. Pref.	7th	
1993–94	5	Reg. Pref.	8th	
1994–95	5	Reg. Pref.	8th	
1995–96	5	Reg. Pref.	4th	
1996–97	5	Reg. Pref.	4th	
1997–98	5	Reg. Pref.	3rd	
1998–99	5	Reg. Pref.	6th	
1999–2000	5	Reg. Pref.	11th	
2000–01	5	Reg. Pref.	7th	
2001–02	5	Reg. Pref.	12th	
2002–03	5	Reg. Pref.	7th	
2003–04	5	Reg. Pref.	4th	
2004–05	5	Reg. Pref.	13th	
2005–06	5	Reg. Pref.	3rd	

Season	Tier	Division	Place	Copa del Rey
2006–07	5	Reg. Pref.	4th	
2007–08	5	Reg. Pref.	6th	
2008–09	5	Reg. Pref.	1st	
2009–10	4	3ª	18th	
2010–11	5	Div. Hon.	4th	
2011–12	5	Div. Hon.	4th	
2012–13	5	Div. Hon.	4th	
2013–14	5	Div. Hon.	3rd	
2014–15	5	Div. Hon.	2nd	
2015–16	4	3ª	20th	
2016–17	5	Div. Hon.	3nd	
2017–18	5	Div. Hon.	10th	
2018–19	5	Div. Hon.	12th	
2019–20	5	Div. Hon.	6th	
2020–21	5	Div. Hon.	4th	
2021–22	6	Div. Hon.	4th	
2022–23	6	Div. Hon.	11th	
2023–24	6	Div. Hon.	2nd	
2024–25	5	3ª Fed.	10th	
2025–26	5	3ª Fed.	10th	

Season	Tier	Division	Place	Copa del Rey
2026–27	5	3ª Fed.		

- 6 seasons in Tercera División
- 3 seasons in Tercera Federación

== Famous players ==
- (Spain) Andoni Zubizarreta
- Bixente Etxeandia
- José Javier Barkero
- Imanol Etxeberria
- Igor Arenaza
- Mikel Etxabe
