= Céltiga FC =

Spanish football club

Coordinates: 42.559107°N 8.880960°W

Céltiga
- Full name: Céltiga Fútbol Club
- Founded: 1926; 100 years ago
- Stadium: Estadio Salvador Otero
- Capacity: 2,000
- President: Harry Dios
- Head coach: Luis Carro
- League: Tercera Federación – Group 1
- 2025–26: Tercera Federación – Group 1, 13th of 18
Home colours	Away colours

Céltiga Fútbol Club is a Spanish football team based in A Illa de Arousa in the autonomous community of Galicia. Founded in 1926, it plays in Tercera Federación – Group 1. Its stadium is Estadio Salvador Otero with a capacity of 2,000 seats.

== Season to season ==
Season	Tier	Division	Place	Copa del Rey
1950–51	5	1ª Reg.	1st	
1951–52	5	1ª Reg.	(R)	
1952–53	5	1ª Reg.	1st	
1953–54	5	1ª Reg.	1st	
1954–55	5	1ª Reg.	6th	
1955–1967	DNP			
1967–68	5	1ª Reg.	4th	
1968–69	5	1ª Reg.		
1969–70	5	1ª Reg.	13th	
1970–71	5	1ª Reg.	11th	
1971–72	5	1ª Reg.	10th	
1972–73	5	1ª Reg.	11th	
1973–74	5	1ª Reg.	7th	
1974–75	5	1ª Reg.	1st	
1975–76	5	1ª Reg.	4th	
1976–77	5	1ª Reg.	3rd	
1977–78	6	1ª Reg.	1st	
1978–79	5	Reg. Pref.	12th	
1979–80	5	Reg. Pref.	9th	
1980–81	4	3ª	19th	

Season	Tier	Division	Place	Copa del Rey
1981–82	5	Reg. Pref.	7th	
1982–83	5	Reg. Pref.	1st	
1983–84	4	3ª	8th	
1984–85	4	3ª	5th	
1985–86	4	3ª	13th	First round
1986–87	4	3ª	7th	
1987–88	4	3ª	8th	
1988–89	4	3ª	19th	
1989–90	5	Reg. Pref.	2nd	
1990–91	5	Reg. Pref.	5th	
1991–92	5	Reg. Pref.	5th	
1992–93	5	Reg. Pref.	6th	
1993–94	5	Reg. Pref.	13th	
1994–95	5	Reg. Pref.	15th	
1995–96	5	Reg. Pref.	13th	
1996–97	5	Reg. Pref.	14th	
1997–98	5	Reg. Pref.	16th	
1998–99	5	Reg. Pref.	9th	
1999–2000	5	Reg. Pref.	7th	
2000–01	5	Reg. Pref.	5th	

Season	Tier	Division	Place	Copa del Rey
2001–02	5	Reg. Pref.	13th	
2002–03	5	Reg. Pref.	11th	
2003–04	5	Reg. Pref.	13th	
2004–05	5	Reg. Pref.	1st	
2005–06	4	3ª	9th	
2006–07	4	3ª	13th	
2007–08	4	3ª	14th	
2008–09	4	3ª	12th	
2009–10	4	3ª	18th	
2010–11	5	Pref. Aut.	5th	
2011–12	5	Pref. Aut.	2nd	
2012–13	4	3ª	19th	
2013–14	5	Pref. Aut.	13th	
2014–15	5	Pref. Aut.	8th	
2015–16	5	Pref.	1st	
2016–17	4	3ª	16th	
2017–18	4	3ª	13th	
2018–19	4	3ª	16th	
2019–20	5	Pref.	5th	
2020–21	DNP			

Season	Tier	Division	Place	Copa del Rey
2021–22	6	Pref.	10th	
2022–23	6	Pref.	4th	
2023–24	6	Pref.	4th	
2024–25	6	Pref. Futgal	2nd	
2025–26	5	3ª Fed.	13th	
2026–27	5	3ª Fed.		

- 14 seasons in Tercera División
- 2 seasons in Tercera Federación
