= Jaime Escario =

Spanish footballer

Personal information
- Full name: Jaime Escario Bara
- Date of birth: 25 July 2003 (age 23)
- Place of birth: Huesca, Spain
- Position: Midfielder

Team information
- Current team: Huesca

Youth career
- Huesca
- Juventud Huesca
- 2020–2022: IPC La Escuela

Senior career*
Years	Team	Apps	(Gls)
2021	Barbastro	2	(0)
2022	Brea	1	(0)
2022–2025	Huesca B	81	(8)
2025–	Huesca	1	(0)
2025–2026	→ Penafiel (loan)	1	(0)
- * Club domestic league appearances and goals as of 20 June 2026

Jaime Escario Bara (born 25 July 2003) is a Spanish footballer who plays as a midfielder for SD Huesca.

== Career ==
Born in Huesca, Aragon, Escario played for SD Huesca, CD Juventud de Huesca and IPC La Escuela Huesca as a youth. He made his senior debut with Tercera División side UD Barbastro during the 2020–21 season (as the club had an affiliation agreement with La Escuela), before also playing in Segunda División RFEF with CD Brea in the following campaign (as the club also agreed to a partnership with La Escuela in that year).

On 5 August 2022, Escario returned to his first club Huesca, being assigned to the reserves in Tercera Federación. He made his first team debut on 27 April 2025, coming on as a late substitute for Jordi Martín in a 1–1 Segunda División away draw against Real Zaragoza.

On 6 July 2025, Escario renewed his contract with the Oscenses for a further year. On 12 August, however, he was loaned to Liga Portugal 2 side FC Penafiel for one year.

On 9 July 2026, Escario further extended his link with Huesca until 2028, being definitely promoted to the main squad now in Primera Federación.
