= CD La Almunia =

Association football club in Spain

La Almunia
- Full name: Club Deportivo La Almunia
- Founded: 1947 (as CD Español de La Almunia); 1959 (refounded as CF La Almunia); 1966 (refounded as CD La Almunia)
- Ground: Tenerías, La Almunia de Doña Godina, Aragon, Spain
- Capacity: 1,500
- President: Tomás Latorre
- Head coach: Fran Jurado
- League: Tercera Federación – Group 17
- 2025–26: Tercera Federación – Group 17, 8th of 18
Home colours	Away colours

Club Deportivo La Almunia is a Spanish football team based in Monzón, in the autonomous community of Aragon. Founded in 1947, they play in Tercera Federación – Group 17, holding home games at Campo Municipal de Fútbol de Tenerías, with a capacity of 1,500 people.

== Season to season ==
Season	Tier	Division	Place	Copa del Rey
1948–49	6	3ª Reg.	1st	
1949–50	5	2ª Reg.	2nd	
1950–51	5	2ª Reg.	1st	
1951–52	4	1ª Reg.	6th	
1952–53	4	1ª Reg.	6th	
1953–1959	DNP			
1959–60	4	1ª Reg.	6th	
1960–61	4	1ª Reg.	4th	
1961–62	4	1ª Reg.	6th	
1962–1967	DNP			
1967–68	5	2ª Reg.	6th	
1968–69	6	2ª Reg.	2nd	
1969–70	6	2ª Reg.	2nd	
1970–71	5	1ª Reg.	3rd	
1971–72	4	Reg. Pref.	11th	
1972–73	4	Reg. Pref.	4th	
1973–74	4	Reg. Pref.	12th	
1974–75	4	Reg. Pref.	13th	
1975–76	4	Reg. Pref.	10th	
1976–77	4	Reg. Pref.	10th	

Season	Tier	Division	Place	Copa del Rey
1977–78	5	Reg. Pref.	18th	
1978–79	6	1ª Reg.	6th	
1979–80	6	1ª Reg.	3rd	
1980–81	6	1ª Reg.	6th	
1981–82	6	1ª Reg.	4th	
1982–83	6	1ª Reg.	1st	
1983–84	5	Reg. Pref.	10th	
1984–85	5	Reg. Pref.	14th	
1985–86	5	Reg. Pref.	20th	
1986–87	5	Reg. Pref.	5th	
1987–88	4	3ª	18th	
1988–89	5	Reg. Pref.	4th	
1989–90	5	Reg. Pref.	3rd	
1990–91	5	Reg. Pref.	8th	
1991–92	5	Reg. Pref.	2nd	
1992–93	4	3ª	12th	
1993–94	4	3ª	10th	
1994–95	4	3ª	9th	
1995–96	4	3ª	17th	
1996–97	4	3ª	15th	

Season	Tier	Division	Place	Copa del Rey
1997–98	4	3ª	10th	
1998–99	4	3ª	15th	
1999–2000	4	3ª	14th	
2000–01	4	3ª	16th	
2001–02	4	3ª	16th	
2002–03	4	3ª	20th	
2003–04	5	Reg. Pref.	4th	
2004–05	5	Reg. Pref.	1st	
2005–06	4	3ª	17th	
2006–07	5	Reg. Pref.	4th	
2007–08	5	Reg. Pref.	6th	
2008–09	5	Reg. Pref.	8th	
2009–10	5	Reg. Pref.	12th	
2010–11	5	Reg. Pref.	8th	
2011–12	5	Reg. Pref.	2nd	
2012–13	4	3ª	17th	
2013–14	5	Reg. Pref.	3rd	
2014–15	5	Reg. Pref.	3rd	
2015–16	5	Reg. Pref.	12th	
2016–17	5	Reg. Pref.	1st	

Season	Tier	Division	Place	Copa del Rey
2017–18	4	3ª	14th	
2018–19	4	3ª	19th	
2019–20	5	Reg. Pref.	10th	
2020–21	5	Reg. Pref.	3rd	
2021–22	6	Reg. Pref.	2nd	
2022–23	5	3ª Fed.	16th	
2023–24	6	Reg. Pref.	2nd	
2024–25	5	3ª Fed.	15th	
2025–26	5	3ª Fed.	8th	
2026–27	5	3ª Fed.		

- 16 seasons in Tercera División
- 4 seasons in Tercera Federación
