= Fernando Maestro =

Spanish footballer

Personal information
- Full name: Fernando Maestro Olalla
- Date of birth: 15 April 1974 (age 52)
- Place of birth: Sant Cugat, Spain
- Height: 1.84 m (6 ft 0 in)
- Position: Goalkeeper

Team information
- Current team: Villaverde Norte (assistant)

Youth career
- Sant Cugat
- 1984–1992: Espanyol

Senior career*
Years	Team	Apps	(Gls)
1992–1993	Espanyol	0	(0)
1992–1993	→ Hospitalet (loan)	23	(0)
1993–1995	Barcelona B	0	(0)
1993	→ Hospitalet (loan)	6	(0)
1994–1995	→ Sant Andreu (loan)	28	(0)
1995–1996	Sant Andreu	24	(0)
1996–1997	Gimnàstic	18	(0)
1997–1998	Ontinyent	37	(0)
1998–1999	Espanyol B	0	(0)
1999	Hospitalet	6	(0)
1999–2000	Dénia		
2000–2001	Gandía	31	(0)
2001–2004	Terrassa	59	(0)
2004–2012	Alcoyano	303	(0)
2012–2013	Corralejo		
Total		535	(0)

International career
1989–1990	Spain U16	9	(0)
1990–1991	Spain U17	8	(0)
1990–1991	Spain U18	8	(0)

Managerial career
- 2025–: Villaverde Norte (assistant)
- * Club domestic league appearances and goals

Fernando Maestro Olalla (born 15 April 1974) is a Spanish retired footballer who played as a goalkeeper, and is the current assistant manager of SD Villaverde Norte.

== Club career ==
Born in Sant Cugat del Vallès, Barcelona, Catalonia, Maestro spent the vast majority of his 21-year senior career in Segunda División B, representing a host of clubs including CE L'Hospitalet and UE Sant Andreu for which he had two different spells each. His Segunda División input consisted of 18 matches with Terrassa FC in two separate seasons – his first game in the competition occurring on 31 August 2002 in a 1–1 home draw against Albacete Balompié in which he was sent off– and 29 for CD Alcoyano in 2011–12 (team relegation).

Maestro retired in 2013 at the age of 39, after a spell with amateurs CD Corralejo. He subsequently became a goalkeepers' coach.
