= SC Torrevieja CF =

Spanish football club

SC Torrevieja
- Full name: Sporting Costablanca Torrevieja Club de Fútbol
- Founded: 1 September 2020; 6 years ago
- Ground: Vicente García, Torrevieja, Valencia, Spain
- Capacity: 6,000
- President: Cayetano Sánchez Butrón
- Manager: Diego Piquero
- League: Tercera Federación – Group 6
- 2025–26: Lliga Comunitat – South, 3rd of 16 (promoted via play-offs)
- Website: sctorrevieja.com
Home colours	Away colours

Sporting Costablanca Torrevieja Club de Fútbol is a Spanish football team based in Torrevieja, in the Valencian Community. Founded in 2020, they play in Tercera Federación – Group 6, holding home matches at Estadio Vicente García.

== History ==
Founded in 2020, SC Torrevieja absorbed Torrevieja CF into their structure in 2021, with the latter becoming the former's youth teams. On 7 June 2026, SC Torrevieja achieved a first-ever promotion to Tercera Federación after defeating CF Benidorm in the promotion play-offs.

== Season to season ==
Season	Tier	Division	Place	Copa del Rey
2020–21	7	2ª Reg.	1st	
2021–22	7	1ª Reg.	2nd	
2022–23	7	1ª Reg.	1st	
2023–24	7	1ª FFCV	1st	
2024–25	6	Lliga Com.	8th	
2025–26	6	Lliga Com.	3rd	
2026–27	5	3ª Fed.		

- 1 season in Tercera Federación
