= UD Añaza =

Spanish football team in Santa Cruz de Tenerife, Canary Islands

Añaza
- Full name: Unión Deportiva Añaza
- Founded: 1990 (as CF Añaza)
- Ground: María José Pérez Gonzalez, Añaza, Santa Cruz de Tenerife, Canary Islands, Spain
- Capacity: 500
- President: Aaron Vargas
- Manager: Eduardo Delgado
- League: Interinsular Preferente
- 2024–25: Interinsular Preferente, 13th of 21
Home colours	Away colours

Unión Deportiva Añaza is a Spanish football team based in Santa Cruz de Tenerife, in the autonomous community of Canary Islands. Founded in 1990, it plays in Interinsular Preferente, holding home matches at Campo de Fútbol María José Pérez Gonzalez, with a capacity of 500 people.

== History ==
Founded in 1990 as Club de Fútbol Añaza, the club established a partnership with UD Tacoronte in 2012, playing under the name of UD Tacoronte-Añaza. In the following year, after suffering relegation, the partnership ended and the club was renamed Asociación Deportiva Añaza.

In 2020, Añaza ceased activities after selling their Interinsular Preferente spot to Real Unión de Tenerife, and only returned two years later, now under the name of Club Deportivo Añaza. Renamed Club Deportivo Añapro in 2023, the club again switched name to Unión Deportiva Añaza in the following year, after achieving promotion back to the Preferente.

On 25 April 2026, Añaza achieved a first-ever promotion to Tercera Federación, after being crowned champions of the Preferente.

== Season to season ==
Season	Tier	Division	Place	Copa del Rey
2004–05	7	2ª Int.	3rd	
2005–06	6	1ª Int.	9th	
2006–07	6	1ª Int.	16th	
2007–08	7	2ª Int.	5th	
2008–09	7	2ª Int.	2nd	
2009–10	7	2ª Int.	6th	
2010–11	6	1ª Int.	4th	
2011–12	6	1ª Int.	9th	
2012–13	6	1ª Int.	16th (Note: Under the name of UD Tacoronte-Añaza after a partnership with UD Tacoronte)	
2013–14	7	2ª Int.	4th	
2014–15	7	2ª Int.	2nd	
2015–16	6	1ª Int.	3rd	
2016–17	6	1ª Int.	8th	
2017–18	6	1ª Int.	1st	
2018–19	5	Int. Pref.	11th	
2019–20	5	Int. Pref.	17th	
2020–21	DNP			
2021–22	DNP			
2022–23	8	2ª Int.	1st	
2023–24	7	1ª Int.	4th	

Season	Tier	Division	Place	Copa del Rey
2024–25	6	Int. Pref.	13th	
2025–26	6	Int. Pref.	1st	
2026–27	5	3ª Fed.		

- 1 season in Tercera Federación
