= CD Egabrense =

Spanish football team

Egabrense
- Full name: Club Deportivo Egabrense
- Founded: 1924
- Ground: María Dolores Jiménez Guardeño, Cabra, Andalusia, Spain
- Capacity: 1,000
- President: Paco Poyato
- Manager: Rafa Escobar
- League: Tercera Federación – Group 10
- 2025–26: División de Honor – Group 1, 3rd of 16 (promoted via play-offs)
Home colours	Away colours

Club Deportivo Egabrense is a Spanish football team based in Cabra, in the autonomous community of Andalusia. Founded in 1924, they play in Tercera Federación – Group 10, holding home matches at Ciudad Deportiva María Dolores Jiménez Guardeño, with a capacity of 1,000 people.

== History ==
Founded in 1924, Egabrense had a senior team until 1947, when it went inactive. The club only returned to an active status in the 1970s, and achieved a first-ever promotion to Tercera División in 1985.

== Season to season ==
Season	Tier	Division	Place	Copa del Rey
1929–1947	—	Regional	—	
1947–1978	DNP			
1978–79	6	1ª Reg.	11th	
1979–80	6	1ª Reg.	14th	
1980–81	6	1ª Reg.	2nd	
1981–82	6	1ª Reg.	8th	
1982–83	6	1ª Reg.	2nd	
1983–84	5	Reg. Pref.	4th	
1984–85	5	Reg. Pref.	1st	
1985–86	4	3ª	16th	
1986–87	4	3ª	19th	
1987–88	5	Reg. Pref.	7th	
1988–89	5	Reg. Pref.	12th	
1989–90	5	Reg. Pref.	5th	
1990–91	5	Reg. Pref.	7th	
1991–92	5	Reg. Pref.	1st	
1992–93	5	Reg. Pref.	1st	
1993–94	4	3ª	19th	
1994–95	5	Reg. Pref.	10th	
1995–96	5	Reg. Pref.	10th	

Season	Tier	Division	Place	Copa del Rey
1996–97	5	Reg. Pref.	5th	
1997–98	5	Reg. Pref.	1st	
1998–99	5	Reg. Pref.	5th	
1999–2000	5	Reg. Pref.	2nd	
2000–01	5	Reg. Pref.	2nd	
2001–02	5	Reg. Pref.	1st	
2002–03	5	Reg. Pref.	1st	
2003–04	5	Reg. Pref.	2nd	
2004–05	6	Reg. Pref.	16th	
2005–06	6	Reg. Pref.	10th	
2006–07	6	Reg. Pref.	2nd	
2007–08	5	1ª And.	16th	
2008–09	6	Reg. Pref.	18th	
2009–10	7	1ª Prov.	12th	
2010–11	7	1ª Prov.	7th	
2011–12	7	1ª Prov.	8th	
2012–13	7	1ª Prov.	5th	
2013–14	7	1ª Prov.	2nd	
2014–15	6	2ª And.	3rd	
2015–16	6	2ª And.	6th	

Season	Tier	Division	Place	Copa del Rey
2016–17	6	1ª And.	7th	
2017–18	6	1ª And.	12th	
2018–19	6	1ª And.	10th	
2019–20	6	1ª And.	5th	
2020–21	6	1ª And.	1st	
2021–22	6	Div. Hon.	12th	
2022–23	6	Div. Hon.	16th	
2023–24	7	1ª And.	4th	
2024–25	7	1ª And.	1st	
2025–26	6	Div. Hon.	3rd	
2026–27	5	3ª Fed.		

- 3 seasons in Tercera División
- 1 season in Tercera Federación
