= CE Sineu =

Spanish football team

Sineu
- Full name: Club Esportiu Sineu
- Founded: 6 February 1942; 84 years ago (as CF Sineu)
- Ground: Son Magí, Sineu, Mallorca, Spain
- Capacity: 1,000
- President: Pep Bergas
- Manager: Amador Gacías
- League: Tercera Federación – Group 11
- 2025–26: División de Honor – Mallorca, 2nd of 18 (promoted)
Home colours	Away colours

Club Esportiu Sineu is a Spanish football team based in Sineu, Mallorca, in the autonomous community of Balearic Islands. Founded in 1942, it plays in Tercera Federación – Group 11, holding home matches at Camp de Futbol Municipal Son Magí, with a capacity of 1,000 people.

== History ==
Founded on 6 February 1942 as Club de Fútbol Sineu, the club played regional football in the 1950s before going into inactivity. Back in 1971, now under the name of Club Deportivo Sineu, the club remained in the lower leagues, and changed name to Club Esportiu Sineu in 2000.

In May 2015, Sineu achieved a promotion to the Primera Regional Preferente de Mallorca, reaching the fifth division 37 years after their last appearance. Relegated in 2024 after the creation of the new sixth tier, the División de Honor, the club achieved promotion to that category in April 2025.

On 19 April 2026, Sineu mathematically achieved promotion to Tercera Federación, the club's first-ever national division in their history, after CE Andratx's relegation which prevented the promotion of their B-team.

== Season to season ==
Season	Tier	Division	Place	Copa del Rey
1942–1955	—	Regional	—	
1955–56	6	3ª Reg.	1st	
1956–57	4	1ª Reg.	2nd	
1957–58	4	1ª Reg.	9th	
1958–59	4	1ª Reg.	13th	
1959–1971	DNP			
1971–72	5	2ª Reg.	17th	
1972–73	7	3ª Reg.	12th	
1973–74	7	3ª Reg.	4th	
1974–75	6	2ª Reg.	1st	
1975–76	5	1ª Reg.	8th	
1976–77	5	1ª Reg.	3rd	
1977–78	5	Reg. Pref.	17th	
1978–79	6	1ª Reg.	14th	
1979–80	6	1ª Reg.	18th	
1980–81	7	2ª Reg.	7th	
1981–82	7	2ª Reg.	17th	
1982–83	DNP			
1983–84	DNP			
1984–85	DNP			

Season	Tier	Division	Place	Copa del Rey
1985–86	8	3ª Reg.	3rd	
1986–87	8	3ª Reg.	2nd	
1987–88	7	2ª Reg.	4th	
1988–89	6	1ª Reg.	17th	
1989–1998	DNP			
1998–99	8	3ª Reg.	10th	
1999–2000	DNP			
2000–01	8	3ª Reg.	4th	
2001–02	8	3ª Reg.	6th	
2002–03	8	3ª Reg.	8th	
2003–04	8	3ª Reg.	12th	
2004–05	DNP			
2005–06	DNP			
2006–07	8	3ª Reg.	13th	
2007–08	8	3ª Reg.	12th	
2008–09	8	3ª Reg.	6th	
2009–10	8	3ª Reg.	3rd	
2010–11	7	2ª Reg.	2nd	
2011–12	6	1ª Reg.	4th	
2012–13	6	1ª Reg.	6th	

Season	Tier	Division	Place	Copa del Rey
2013–14	6	1ª Reg.	7th	
2014–15	6	1ª Reg.	1st	
2015–16	5	Reg. Pref.	6th	
2016–17	5	Reg. Pref.	7th	
2017–18	5	Reg. Pref.	11th	
2018–19	5	Reg. Pref.	5th	
2019–20	5	Reg. Pref.	10th	
2020–21	5	Reg. Pref.	3rd	
2021–22	6	Reg. Pref.	5th	
2022–23	6	Reg. Pref.	6th	
2023–24	6	Reg. Pref.	11th	
2024–25	7	Reg. Pref.	1st	
2025–26	6	Div. Hon.	2nd	
2026–27	5	3ª Fed.		

- 1 season in Tercera Federación
