= Bullas Deportivo =

Association football club in Spain

- Full name: Bullas Deportivo
- Founded: 2016
- Ground: Nicolás de las Peñas, Bullas, Region of Murcia, Spain
- Capacity: 2,000
- Manager: Alfonso Campoy
- League: Preferente Autonómica
- 2024–25: Primera Autonómica – Group 2, 2nd of 16 (promoted)
| Home colours | Away colours |

Bullas Deportivo is a Spanish football team based in Bullas, in the Region of Murcia. Founded in 2016, it plays in Preferente Autonómica, and holding home matches at Estadio Nicolás de las Peñas.

== History ==
Founded in 2016 as Bullense Deportivo, the club only had youth sides and changed name to Bullas Deportivo in the following year. In 2023, the club started a senior team in the Segunda Autonómica, and achieved promotion to Primera Autonómica in their first year.

A second consecutive promotion to Preferente Autonómica followed in 2025, and on 17 May 2026, Bullas Deportivo first reached Tercera Federación after finishing second in the Preferente.

== Season to season ==
| Season | Tier | Division | Place | Copa del Rey |
|---|---|---|---|---|
| 2023–24 | 8 | 2ª Aut. | 2nd | |
| 2024–25 | 7 | 1ª Aut. | 2nd | |
| 2025–26 | 6 | Pref. Aut. | 2nd | |
| 2026–27 | 5 | 3ª Fed. | | |

- 1 season in Tercera Federación
