= San Javier CF =

Association football club in Spain

San Javier
- Full name: San Javier Mar Menor Club de Fútbol
- Founded: 10 July 2023; 2 years ago
- Ground: Pitín, San Javier, Murcia, Spain
- Capacity: 3,000
- President: Pablo Bastida
- Manager: Guillermo Gómez
- League: Preferente Autonómica
- 2024–25: Primera Autonómica – Group 1, 1st of 16 (champions)
- Website: sanjavierclubdefutbol.es
Home colours	Away colours

San Javier Mar Menor Club de Fútbol is a Spanish football team based in San Javier, in the Region of Murcia. Founded in 2023, it plays in Preferente Autonómica, and holding home matches at Estadio Pitín.

== History ==
After Mar Menor FC moved to the city of Cartagena, San Javier was founded on 10 July 2023 as an intent to reactivate football in the city. The club started in Segunda Autonómica, and achieved promotion to Primera Autonómica in their first year.

A second consecutive promotion to Preferente Autonómica followed in 2025, and on 17 May 2026, San Javier first reached Tercera Federación after finishing third in the Preferente.

== Season to season ==
Season	Tier	Division	Place	Copa del Rey
2023–24	8	2ª Aut.	2nd	
2024–25	7	1ª Aut.	1st	
2025–26	6	Pref. Aut.	3rd	
2026–27	5	3ª Fed.		

- 1 season in Tercera Federación
