= CF Gazte Berriak =

Association football club in Spain

Gazte Berriak
- Full name: Club de Fútbol Gazte Berriak Antsoain
- Founded: 15 June 1993; 33 years ago
- Ground: Idaki, Ansoáin, Navarre, Spain
- Capacity: 300
- President: Mikel Garriz
- Manager: Eric Araque
- League: Tercera Federación – Group 15
- 2025–26: Primera Autonómica, 2nd of 18 (promoted)
- Website: gazteberriak.com
Home colours	Away colours

Club de Fútbol Gazte Berriak Antsoain is a Spanish football team based in Ansoáin, in the autonomous community of Navarre. Founded in 1993, it plays in Tercera Federación – Group 15, holding home matches at Campo de Fútbol Idaki.

== History ==
History of football in the city of Ansoaín traces back to the 1970s, where five teams – SDRC Charco, CD Ansoáin, CD Errotazar, ADE Divina Pastora and ADE Gazte Berriak – were created in the city. The latter two merged in 1981 to create PFDyC Gazte Berriak, but this club was dissolved in 1985, with CF Kiroldegui being created in their place shortly after. In 1992, Kiroldegui was also dissolved, and PFDyC Gazte Berriak returned.

On 15 June 1993, Club Deportivo Gazte Berriak was founded, being run by the city council. In 2013, the club was renamed Club de Fútbol Gazte Berriak Antsoain and stopped to belong to the city. They achieved a promotion to the Regional Preferente in 2022, and to Primera Autonómica in 2025.

On 24 May 2026, Gazte Berriak achieved a first-ever promotion to Tercera Federación.

== Season to season ==
Season	Tier	Division	Place	Copa del Rey
2016–17	7	1ª Reg.	10th	
2017–18	7	1ª Reg.	8th	
2018–19	7	1ª Reg.	11th	
2019–20	7	1ª Reg.	7th	
2020–21	7	1ª Reg.	1st	
2021–22	8	1ª Reg.	2nd	
2022–23	8	1ª Reg.	2nd	
2023–24	7	Reg. Pref.	3rd	
2024–25	7	Reg. Pref.	2nd	
2025–26	6	1ª Aut.	2nd	
2026–27	5	3ª Fed.		

- 1 season in Tercera Federación
