= CD Robres =

Association football club in Spain

Robres
- Full name: Club Deportivo Robres
- Founded: 2001; 25 years ago
- Stadium: San Blas
- Capacity: 400
- President: Miguel Ángel Lacruz
- Head coach: Eloy Aznar
- League: Tercera Federación – Group 17
- 2025–26: Tercera Federación – Group 17, 13th of 18
| Home colours | Away colours |

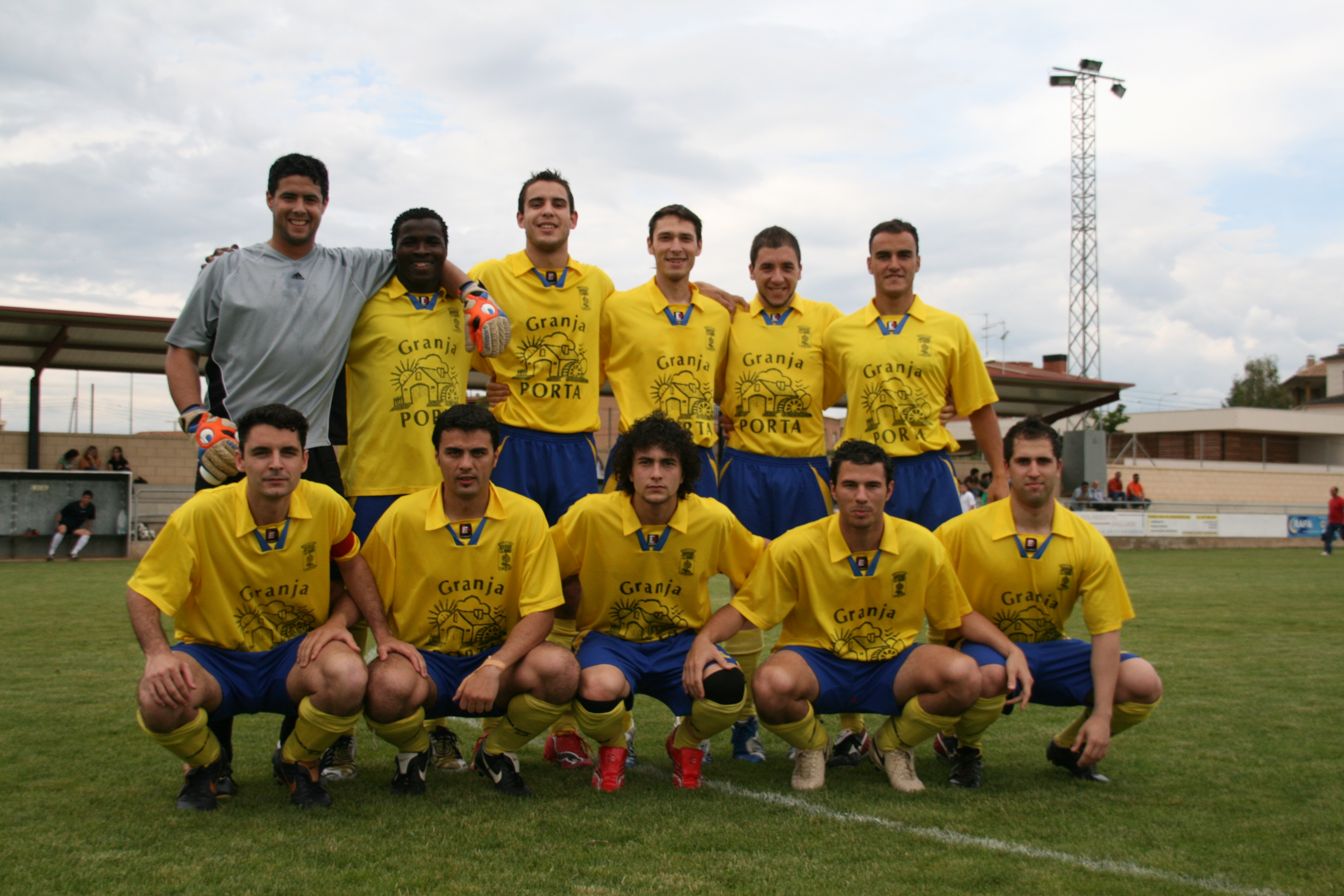
CD Robres squad in 2008

Club Deportivo Robres is a Spanish football team based in Robres, in the autonomous community of Aragon. Founded in 2001, it plays in Tercera Federación – Group 17, holding home matches at Estadio Municipal San Blas.

Since June 2017, it is the reserve team of CD Ebro.

== History ==
Founded in 1947, the club reached the Third Division of Spain for the first time in the 2011–12 season. In the 2018–19 season the club finished 14th in the Tercera División, Group 17.

== Season to season ==
| Season | Tier | Division | Place | Copa del Rey |
|---|---|---|---|---|
| 2001–02 | 7 | 2ª Reg. | 1st | |
| 2002–03 | 6 | 1ª Reg. | 1st | |
| 2003–04 | 5 | Reg. Pref. | 14th | |
| 2004–05 | 5 | Reg. Pref. | 12th | |
| 2005–06 | 5 | Reg. Pref. | 8th | |
| 2006–07 | 5 | Reg. Pref. | 7th | |
| 2007–08 | 5 | Reg. Pref. | 14th | |
| 2008–09 | 5 | Reg. Pref. | 6th | |
| 2009–10 | 5 | Reg. Pref. | 6th | |
| 2010–11 | 5 | Reg. Pref. | 2nd | |
| 2011–12 | 4 | 3ª | 15th | |
| 2012–13 | 4 | 3ª | 19th | |
| 2013–14 | 5 | Reg. Pref. | 9th | |
| 2014–15 | 5 | Reg. Pref. | 4th | |
| 2015–16 | 5 | Reg. Pref. | 1st | |
| 2016–17 | 4 | 3ª | 8th | |
| 2017–18 | 4 | 3ª | 5th | N/A (Note: Reserve team of Ebro.) |
| 2018–19 | 4 | 3ª | 14th | N/A |
| 2019–20 | 4 | 3ª | 15th | N/A |
| 2020–21 | 4 | 3ª | 9th | N/A |

| Season | Tier | Division | Place | Copa del Rey |
|---|---|---|---|---|
| 2021–22 | 5 | 3ª RFEF | 5th | N/A |
| 2022–23 | 5 | 3ª Fed. | 1st | N/A |
| 2023–24 | 6 | Reg. Pref. | 2nd | N/A |
| 2024–25 | 6 | Reg. Pref. | 1st | N/A |
| 2025–26 | 5 | 3ª Fed. | 13th | N/A |
| 2026–27 | 5 | 3ª Fed. | | N/A |

- 7 seasons in Tercera División
- 4 seasons in Tercera Federación/Tercera División RFEF
