= AD Cala Pozuelo =

Spanish football club

Cala Pozuelo
- Full name: Agrupación Deportiva Cala Pozuelo
- Founded: 1965
- Ground: El Pradillo
- Capacity: 1,000
- President: Rafael Gómez
- Manager: Miguel Perrote
- League: Tercera Federación – Group 7
- 2025–26: Primera Autonómica de Aficionados – Group 1, 2nd of 18 (promoted)
- Website: https://adcalapozuelo.com/
| Home colours | Away colours |

Agrupación Deportiva Cala Pozuelo is a Spanish football club based in Pozuelo de Alarcón, in the Community of Madrid. Founded in 1965, the club play in the Tercera Federación – Group 7.

== History ==
Founded in 1965 as Antiguos Alumnos Escolapios by members of the Escolapios de Pozuelo college, the club was renamed Club Deportivo Calasancio de Antiguos Alumnos in 1977. In 1984, they switched name to Club de Fútbol Escolapios Calasanz, before another new name, Agrupación Deportiva Calasanz de Pozuelo, was established in 1997.

In 2021, Calasanz was renamed to Agrupación Deportiva Cala Pozuelo. In 2024, the club achieved a first-ever promotion to Tercera Federación.

== Season-to-season ==
| Season | Tier | Division | Place | Copa del Rey |
|---|---|---|---|---|
| 1971–72 | 7 | 3ª Reg. | 4th | |
| 1972–73 | 6 | 3ª Reg. P. | 8th | |
| 1973–74 | 7 | 3ª Reg. P. | 1st | |
| 1974–75 | 6 | 2ª Reg. | 8th | |
| 1975–76 | 6 | 2ª Reg. | 6th | |
| 1976–77 | 6 | 2ª Reg. | 4th | |
| 1977–78 | 6 | 1ª Reg. | 11th | |
| 1978–79 | 6 | 1ª Reg. | 12th | |
| 1979–80 | 6 | 1ª Reg. | 17th | |
| 1980–81 | 7 | 2ª Reg. | 12th | |
| 1981–82 | 7 | 2ª Reg. | 12th | |
| 1982–83 | 7 | 2ª Reg. | 4th | |
| 1983–84 | 6 | 1ª Reg. | 10th | |
| 1984–85 | 6 | 1ª Reg. | 6th | |
| 1985–86 | 6 | 1ª Reg. | 12th | |
| 1986–87 | 6 | 1ª Reg. | 7th | |
| 1987–88 | 6 | 1ª Reg. | 6th | |
| 1988–89 | 6 | 1ª Reg. | 9th | |
| 1989–90 | 6 | 1ª Reg. | 12th | |
| 1990–91 | 6 | 1ª Reg. | 13th | |

| Season | Tier | Division | Place | Copa del Rey |
|---|---|---|---|---|
| 1991–92 | 6 | 1ª Reg. | 3rd | |
| 1992–93 | 6 | 1ª Reg. | 13th | |
| 1993–94 | 6 | 1ª Reg. | 18th | |
| 1994–95 | 7 | 2ª Reg. | 1st | |
| 1995–96 | 6 | 1ª Reg. | 5th | |
| 1996–97 | 6 | 1ª Reg. | 9th | |
| 1997–98 | 6 | 1ª Reg. | 7th | |
| 1998–99 | 6 | 1ª Reg. | 13th | |
| 1999–2000 | 6 | 1ª Reg. | 18th | |
| 2000–01 | 7 | 2ª Reg. | 3rd | |
| 2001–02 | 7 | 2ª Reg. | 2nd | |
| 2002–03 | 6 | 1ª Reg. | 10th | |
| 2003–04 | 6 | 1ª Reg. | 13th | |
| 2004–05 | 6 | 1ª Reg. | 18th | |
| 2005–06 | 7 | 2ª Reg. | 11th | |
| 2006–07 | 7 | 2ª Reg. | 7th | |
| 2007–08 | 7 | 2ª Reg. | 6th | |
| 2008–09 | 7 | 2ª Reg. | 12th | |
| 2009–10 | 7 | 2ª Afic. | 3rd | |
| 2010–11 | 7 | 2ª Afic. | 3rd | |

| Season | Tier | Division | Place | Copa del Rey |
|---|---|---|---|---|
| 2011–12 | 6 | 1ª Afic. | 13th | |
| 2012–13 | 6 | 1ª Afic. | 5th | |
| 2013–14 | 6 | 1ª Afic. | 7th | |
| 2014–15 | 6 | 1ª Afic. | 7th | |
| 2015–16 | 6 | 1ª Afic. | 3rd | |
| 2016–17 | 6 | 1ª Afic. | 3rd | |
| 2017–18 | 6 | 1ª Afic. | 4th | |
| 2018–19 | 6 | 1ª Afic. | 6th | |
| 2019–20 | 6 | 1ª Afic. | 12th | |
| 2020–21 | 6 | 1ª Afic. | 6th | |
| 2021–22 | 7 | 1ª Afic. | 4th | |
| 2022–23 | 7 | 1ª Afic. | 1st | |
| 2023–24 | 6 | Pref. | 1st | |
| 2024–25 | 5 | 3ª Fed. | 15th | |
| 2025–26 | 6 | 1ª Aut. | 2nd | |
| 2026–27 | 5 | 3ª Fed. | | |

- 2 seasons in Tercera Federación

== Official website ==
- Official website (in Spanish)
- "Spain - AD Cala Pozuelo". Soccerway.
