= CD Calasanz =

Association football club in Spain

Calasanz
- Full name: Club Deportivo Calasanz
- Founded: 3 March 1987; 39 years ago
- Ground: José Andrés Diago, Soria, Castile and León, Spain
- Capacity: 500
- President: Gonzalo Irigoyen Barranco
- Manager: Fran Valero
- League: Tercera Federación – Group 8
- 2025–26: Primera Regional – Group A, 1st of 16 (champions)
- Website: cdcalasanzsoria.com
Home colours	Away colours

Club Deportivo Calasanz is a football team based in Soria in the autonomous community of Castile and León. Founded in 1987, they play in the Tercera Federación – Group 8, holding home matches at the Campo de Fútbol José Andrés Diago, with a capacity of 500 people.

== History ==
Founded in 1987, Calasanz only played youth competitions before starting a senior team in 2002, playing in the regional leagues. After closing their senior department in 2006, they only returned to first team competitions in 2013.

On 2 May 2023, a change of shield was approved by the club. On 1 May 2026, they achieved a first-ever promotion to Tercera Federación after a 7–0 routing of UD El Espinar-San Rafael.

== Season to season ==
Season	Tier	Division	Place	Copa del Rey
2002–03	6	1ª Prov.	7th	
2003–04	6	1ª Prov.	4th	
2004–05	6	1ª Prov.	9th	
2005–06	6	1ª Prov.	12th	
2006–2013	DNP			
2013–14	6	1ª Prov.	2nd	
2014–15	6	1ª Prov.	7th	
2015–16	6	1ª Prov.	5th	
2016–17	6	1ª Prov.	8th	
2017–18	6	1ª Prov.	1st	
2018–19	5	1ª Reg.	11th	
2019–20	5	1ª Reg.	14th	
2020–21	5	1ª Reg.	5th	
2021–22	6	1ª Reg.	10th	
2022–23	6	1ª Reg.	8th	
2023–24	6	1ª Reg.	11th	
2024–25	6	1ª Reg.	5th	
2025–26	6	1ª Reg.	1st	
2026–27	5	3ª Fed.		

- 1 season in Tercera Federación
