= Rui Santos (footballer) =

Portuguese footballer (born 1989)

Personal information
- Full name: Rui Filipe Vogado Ferreira dos Santos
- Date of birth: 2 April 1989 (age 37)
- Place of birth: Oeiras, Portugal
- Height: 1.86 m (6 ft 1 in)
- Position: Goalkeeper

Team information
- Current team: Antela
- Number: 1

Youth career
- 1997–1999: Porto Salvo
- 1999–2008: Benfica

Senior career*
Years	Team	Apps	(Gls)
2008–2009	Atlético	7	(0)
2009–2011	Oriental	15	(0)
2011–2012	Oeiras	31	(0)
2012	Casa Pia	0	(0)
2012–2013	Oeiras	24	(0)
2013–2014	Vianense	15	(0)
2014–2015	Trofense	8	(0)
2015–2016	Atlético Reguengos	15	(0)
2016	Oliveira do Hospital	10	(0)
2016–2017	Ponte da Barca	23	(0)
2017–2018	Barbadás		
2018–2020	Arenteiro	62	(0)
2020–2021	Rápido de Bouzas	15	(0)
2022–2023	Atlético Arnoia	23	(0)
2023–	Antela	15	(0)
- * Club domestic league appearances and goals as of 20:04, 7 January 2024 (UTC)

Rui Filipe Vogado Ferreira dos Santos (born 2 April 1989 in Oeiras) is a Portuguese footballer who plays for Antela as a goalkeeper.

On 16 September 2012, Santos made his professional debut with Casa Pia in a 2012–13 Taça de Portugal match against Penafiel.
