= SD Villaverde Norte =

Spanish football club

Villaverde Norte
- Full name: Sociedad Deportiva Villaverde Norte
- Founded: 1976
- Ground: Doña Julita, Villaverde, La Oliva, Fuerteventura, Canary Islands, Spain
- Capacity: 1,200
- President: Rubén Pérez
- Manager: Saulo Alonso
- League: Tercera Federación – Group 12
- 2025–26: Interinsular Preferente, 2nd of 19 (promoted via play-offs)
- Website: sdvillaverdenorte.es
Home colours	Away colours

Sociedad Deportiva Villaverde Norte is a Spanish football team based in Villaverde, La Oliva, in the autonomous community of Canary Islands. Founded in 1976, they play in Tercera Federación – Group 12, holding home matches at Campo de Fútbol Doña Julita, with a capacity of 1,200 people.

== Honours ==
Founded in 1976, Villaverde Norte only played in the lower leagues before achieving a first-ever promotion to the Interinsular Preferente de Las Palmas in 2013. Immediately relegated back, the club only returned to that division in 2024, now the sixth tier.

On 14 June 2026, Villaverde Norte reached Tercera Federación for the first time ever, after defeating UD Playas de Sotavento in the promotion play-off finals.

== Season to season ==
Season	Tier	Division	Place	Copa del Rey
1980–81	8	3ª Reg.	3rd	
1981–82	8	3ª Reg.	7th	
1982–83	8	3ª Reg.	7th	
1983–84	7	2ª Reg.		
1984–85	6	1ª Reg.		
1985–86	6	1ª Reg.	10th	
1986–87	6	1ª Reg.		
1987–88	6	1ª Reg.		
1988–89	6	1ª Reg.		
1989–90	6	1ª Reg.		
1990–91	6	1ª Reg.	8th	
1991–92	6	1ª Reg.		
1992–93	6	1ª Reg.	6th	
1993–94	6	1ª Reg.	5th	
1994–95	6	1ª Reg.	4th	
1995–96	6	1ª Reg.	5th	
1996–97	6	1ª Reg.	5th	
1997–98	6	1ª Reg.		
1998–99	6	1ª Reg.	10th	
1999–2000	DNP			

Season	Tier	Division	Place	Copa del Rey
2000–01	DNP			
2001–02	DNP			
2002–03	6	1ª Reg.	11th	
2003–04	6	1ª Reg.	12th	
2004–05	6	1ª Reg.	9th	
2005–06	6	1ª Reg.	9th	
2006–07	6	1ª Reg.	7th	
2007–08	6	1ª Reg.	4th	
2008–09	6	1ª Reg.	7th	
2009–10	6	1ª Reg.	4th	
2010–11	6	1ª Reg.	4th	
2011–12	6	1ª Reg.	6th	
2012–13	6	1ª Reg.	4th	
2013–14	5	Int. Pref.	6th	
2014–15	6	1ª Reg.	1st	
2015–16	6	1ª Reg.	6th	
2016–17	6	1ª Reg.	3rd	
2017–18	6	1ª Reg.	5th	
2018–19	6	1ª Reg.	8th	
2019–20	6	1ª Reg.	10th	

Season	Tier	Division	Place	Copa del Rey
2020–21	6	1ª Reg.	5th	
2021–22	7	1ª Reg.	3rd	
2022–23	7	1ª Reg.	1st	
2023–24	7	1ª Reg.	1st	
2024–25	6	Int. Pref.	7th	
2025–26	6	Int. Pref.	2nd	
2026–27	5	3ª Fed.		

- 1 season in Tercera Federación
