= EF Puebla de la Calzada =

Association football club in Spain

Puebla de la Calzada
- Full name: Escuela de Fútbol Puebla de la Calzada
- Founded: 2007
- Ground: Municipal, Puebla de la Calzada, Extremadura, Spain
- Capacity: 1,000
- President: Ignacio García Cortes
- Manager: José Enrique Pineda
- League: Tercera Federación – Group 14
- 2025–26: Tercera Federación – Group 14, 12th of 18
- Website: https://pueblaef.es/
Home colours	Away colours

Escuela de Fútbol Puebla de la Calzada is a Spanish football team located in the town of Puebla de la Calzada, in the autonomous community of Extremadura. Founded in 2007, they currently play in Tercera Federación – Group 14, holding home matches at Estadio Municipal de Puebla de la Calzada, with a capacity of 1,000 spectators.

== Season to season ==
Season	Tier	Division	Place	Copa del Rey
2007–08	6	1ª Reg.	2nd	
2008–09	5	Reg. Pref.	3rd	
2009–10	5	Reg. Pref.	4th	
2010–11	5	Reg. Pref.	3rd	
2011–12	5	Reg. Pref.	8th	
2012–13	5	Reg. Pref.	4th	
2013–14	5	Reg. Pref.	10th	
2014–15	5	Reg. Pref.	13th	
2015–16	5	Reg. Pref.	10th	
2016–17	5	1ª Ext.	13th	
2017–18	5	1ª Ext.	9th	
2018–19	5	1ª Ext.	14th	
2019–20	6	2ª Ext.	1st	
2020–21	6	2ª Ext.	1st	
2021–22	6	1ª Ext.	11th	
2022–23	6	1ª Ext.	5th	
2023–24	6	1ª Ext.	1st	
2024–25	5	3ª Fed.	14th	
2025–26	5	3ª Fed.	12th	
2026–27	5	3ª Fed.		

- 3 seasons in Tercera Federación
