= Internacional Huesca =

Association football club in Spain

- Full name: Siétamo Escuela de Fútbol Base Huesca Club Deportivo
- Founded: 1983 (as CD Siétamo)
- Ground: Huesca-Universidad, Huesca, Aragon, Spain
- Capacity: 940
- President: Cheng Shao
- Manager: Pep Oriol
- League: Tercera Federación – Group 17
- 2025–26: Regional Preferente – Group 1, 2nd of 18 (promoted via play-offs)
- Website: efhuesca.com
Home colours	Away colours

Internacional Huesca (officially Siétamo Escuela de Fútbol Base Huesca Club Deportivo) is a Spanish football team based in Huesca, in the autonomous community of Aragon. Founded in 1983, they play in Tercera Federación – Group 17, holding home matches at Campo de Fútbol de la Universidad de Zaragoza - Campus Huesca.

Internacional is the senior side of Escuela de Fútbol Huesca.

== History ==
Founded in 1983, Club Deportivo Siétamo played in the regional leagues until 2010, and went inactive for a year before returning and being subsequently bought by a Chinese group in 2018. The club was then renamed Escuela Huesca Siétamo, before being called Siétamo IPC in 2020, and then officially Siétamo EFB Huesca CD in 2021 (although the first team was more widely known as Internacional Huesca).

On 17 May 2026, after six consecutive seasons in the Regional Preferente, Internacional achieved a first-ever promotion to Tercera Federación.

== Season to season ==
Season	Tier	Division	Place	Copa del Rey
1983–84	7	2ª Reg.	13th	
1984–85	7	2ª Reg.	14th	
1985–86	7	2ª Reg.	11th	
1986–87	7	2ª Reg.	9th	
1987–88	7	2ª Reg.	10th	
1988–89	7	2ª Reg.	12th	
1989–90	7	2ª Reg.	3rd	
1990–91	7	2ª Reg.	4th	
1991–92	7	2ª Reg.	7th	
1992–93	7	2ª Reg.	12th	
1993–94	7	2ª Reg.	8th	
1994–95	7	2ª Reg.	8th	
1995–96	7	2ª Reg.	13th	
1996–97	7	2ª Reg.	12th	
1997–98	7	2ª Reg.	2nd	
1998–99	7	2ª Reg.	4th	
1999–2000	6	1ª Reg.	16th	
2000–01	7	2ª Reg.	5th	
2001–02	7	2ª Reg.	4th	
2002–03	7	2ª Reg.	6th	

Season	Tier	Division	Place	Copa del Rey
2003–04	7	2ª Reg.	8th	
2004–05	7	2ª Reg.	5th	
2005–06	7	2ª Reg.	7th	
2006–07	7	2ª Reg.	3rd	
2007–08	7	2ª Reg.	7th	
2008–09	7	2ª Reg.	12th	
2009–10	7	2ª Reg.	14th	
2010–11	DNP			
2011–12	7	2ª Reg.	8th	
2012–13	7	2ª Reg.	9th	
2013–14	7	2ª Reg.	3rd	
2014–15	7	2ª Reg.	2nd	
2015–16	6	1ª Reg.	5th	
2016–17	6	1ª Reg.	10th	
2017–18	6	1ª Reg.	9th	
2018–19	6	1ª Reg.	15th	
2019–20	6	1ª Reg.	1st	
2020–21	5	Reg. Pref.	5th	
2021–22	6	Reg. Pref.	3rd	
2022–23	6	Reg. Pref.	2nd	

Season	Tier	Division	Place	Copa del Rey
2023–24	6	Reg. Pref.	4th	
2024–25	6	Reg. Pref.	7th	
2025–26	6	Reg. Pref.	2nd	
2026–27	5	3ª Fed.		

- 1 season in Tercera Federación
