= Antela FC =

Spanish football club

Antela
- Full name: Antela Fútbol Clube
- Nicknames: Os da Lagoa; Los de la Laguna
- Founded: 1919; 107 years ago
- Stadium: A Moreira
- Capacity: 1,000
- President: Pablo Losada
- Head coach: Bruno Gómez
- League: Tercera Federación – Group 1
- 2025–26: Preferente Futgal – Group 2, 5th of 18 (promoted via play-offs)
- Website: antela.fala.gal
Home colours	Away colours

Antela Fútbol Clube is a Spanish football team based in Xinzo de Limia, in the autonomous community of Galicia. Founded in 1919, they play in Tercera Federación – Group 1, holding home matches at Estadio da Moreira, which has a capacity of 1,000 spectators.

== History ==
Founded in 1919, Antela began playing senior competitions in 1971. The club first played in the Regional Preferente in 1984, suffering relegation six seasons later.

In April 2025, Antela returned to the Preferente Futgal after a one-year absence. In June of the following year, the club achieved a first-ever promotion to Tercera Federación, after defeating San Tirso SD in the promotion play-offs.

== Season to season ==
Season	Tier	Division	Place	Copa del Rey
1971–72	5	1ª Reg.	8th	
1972–73	5	1ª Reg.	9th	
1973–74	6	2ª Reg.	5th	
1974–75	6	2ª Reg.	6th	
1975–76	6	2ª Reg.	6th	
1976–77	5	1ª Reg.	2nd	
1977–78	6	1ª Reg.	1st	
1978–79	6	1ª Reg.	6th	
1979–80	6	1ª Reg.	13th	
1980–81	6	1ª Reg.	17th	
1981–82	6	1ª Reg.	8th	
1982–83	6	1ª Reg.	5th	
1983–84	6	1ª Reg.	1st	
1984–85	5	Reg. Pref.	19th	
1985–86	5	Reg. Pref.	8th	
1986–87	5	Reg. Pref.	10th	
1987–88	5	Reg. Pref.	11th	
1988–89	5	Reg. Pref.	11th	
1989–90	5	Reg. Pref.	19th	
1990–91	6	1ª Reg.	10th	

Season	Tier	Division	Place	Copa del Rey
1991–92	6	1ª Reg.	17th	
1992–93	7	2ª Reg.	4th	
1993–94	7	2ª Reg.	2nd	
1994–95	6	1ª Reg.	13th	
1995–96	6	1ª Reg.	7th	
1996–97	6	1ª Reg.	11th	
1997–98	6	1ª Reg.	10th	
1998–99	6	1ª Reg.	4th	
1999–2000	6	1ª Reg.	9th	
2000–01	6	1ª Reg.	10th	
2001–02	6	1ª Reg.	1st	
2002–03	5	Reg. Pref.	13th	
2003–04	5	Reg. Pref.	14th	
2004–05	5	Reg. Pref.	18th	
2005–06	6	1ª Reg.	3rd	
2006–07	6	1ª Aut.	1st	
2007–08	5	Pref. Aut.	19th	
2008–09	6	1ª Aut.	7th	
2009–10	6	1ª Aut.	11th	
2010–11	6	1ª Aut.	15th	

Season	Tier	Division	Place	Copa del Rey
2011–12	7	2ª Aut.	4th	
2012–13	7	2ª Aut.	2nd	
2013–14	6	1ª Aut.	14th	
2014–15	6	1ª Aut.	14th	
2015–16	6	1ª Aut.	13th	
2016–17	6	1ª Gal.	11th	
2017–18	6	1ª Gal.	2nd	
2018–19	5	Pref.	19th	
2019–20	6	1ª Gal.	6th	
2020–21	DNP			
2021–22	7	1ª Gal.	3rd	
2022–23	6	Pref.	8th	
2023–24	6	Pref.	14th	
2024–25	7	1ª Futgal	1st	
2025–26	6	Pref. Futgal	5th	
2026–27	5	3ª Fed.		

- 1 season in Tercera Federación
