= UD Playas de Sotavento =

Spanish football club

Playas de Sotavento
- Full name: Unión Deportiva Playas de Sotavento
- Nickname: Sota
- Founded: 2009; 17 years ago
- Ground: Morro Jable, Pájara, Fuerteventura, Canary Islands, Spain
- Capacity: 1,000
- President: David Brito
- Head coach: Tillo Lasso
- League: Tercera Federación – Group 12
- 2025–26: Interinsular Preferente, 3rd of 19 (promoted)
| Home colours | Away colours |

Unión Deportiva Playas de Sotavento is a Spanish football team based in Pájara, in the autonomous community of Canary Islands. Founded in 2009, it plays in Tercera Federación – Group 12, holding home matches at Campo de Fútbol Morro Jable, with a capacity of 1,000 people.

== Season to season ==
| Season | Tier | Division | Place | Copa del Rey |
|---|---|---|---|---|
| 2014–15 | 6 | 1ª Afic. | 2nd | |
| 2015–16 | 6 | 1ª Afic. | 7th | |
| 2016–17 | 6 | 1ª Afic. | 4th | |
| 2017–18 | 6 | 1ª Afic. | 3rd | |
| 2018–19 | 6 | 1ª Afic. | 3rd | |
| 2019–20 | 6 | 1ª Afic. | 6th | |
| 2020–21 | 6 | 1ª Afic. | 2nd | |
| 2021–22 | 7 | 1ª Afic. | 1st | |
| 2022–23 | 6 | Int. Pref. | 5th | |
| 2023–24 | 6 | Int. Pref. | 4th | |
| 2024–25 | 6 | Int. Pref. | 5th | Preliminary |
| 2025–26 | 6 | Int. Pref. | 3rd | |
| 2026–27 | 5 | 3ª Fed. | | |

- 1 season in Tercera Federación
