= CD Málaga Juniors FC =

Association football club in Spain

Málaga Juniors
- Full name: Club Deportivo Málaga Juniors Fútbol Club
- Nickname: FCMC
- Founded: 2013; 13 years ago (as FC Málaga City)
- Ground: Enrique López Cuenca; Nerja, Andalusia, Spain
- Capacity: 2,000
- Chairman: Amelia Asik
- Manager: Sefi Gil
- League: Tercera Federación – Group 9
- 2025–26: División de Honor – Group 2, 2nd of 18 (promoted)
- Website: www.fcmalagacity.com
Home colours	Away colours

Club Deportivo Málaga Juniors Fútbol Club, formerly known as Fútbol Club Málaga City, is a Spanish football club located in Vélez-Málaga, in the autonomous community of Andalusia. Founded in 2013, they play in Tercera Federación – Group 9, holding home matches at Estadio Enrique López Cuenca in Nerja, with a capacity of 2,000 spectators.

== History ==
Logo used until 2025

Málaga City were founded in 2013 and started to play youth friendly matches in 2015. In 2017, they acquired CD Almuñécar City to be a part of their academy setup.

In 2019, the club launched a branch in New York named FC Málaga City New York. The agreement ended in 2021, with the club being renamed to Pathfinder FC.

In 2020, Málaga City established a senior squad in the Primera Andaluza, replacing dissolved CD Barrio Nuestra Señora de los Remedios. They achieved two consecutive promotions in their first two years, reaching Tercera Federación.

In September 2022, the club established a partnership with Tottenham Hotspur. In 2025, after suffering relegation from the fifth tier, the club was renamed Club Deportivo Málaga Juniors Fútbol Club.

== Season to season ==
Season	Tier	Division	Place	Copa del Rey
2020–21	6	1ª And.	1st	
2021–22	6	Div. Hon.	2nd	
2022–23	5	3ª Fed.	14th	
2023–24	5	3ª Fed.	15th	
2024–25	5	3ª Fed.	18th	
2025–26	6	Div. Hon.	2nd	
2026–27	5	3ª Fed.		

- 4 seasons in Tercera Federación
