= Quintana de la Serena =

Coordinates: 38°44′N 5°40′W

Quintana de la Serena, Spain
- Coat of arms
- Interactive map of Quintana de la Serena, Spain
- Country: Spain
- Autonomous community: Extremadura
- Province: Badajoz
- Municipality: Quintana de la Serena

Area
  - Total: 115 km^{2} (44 sq mi)
- Elevation: 495 m (1,624 ft)

Population (2025-01-01)
  - Total: 4,429
  - Density: 38.5/km^{2} (99.7/sq mi)
- Time zone: UTC+1 (CET)
  - Summer (DST): UTC+2 (CEST)

Quintana de la Serena is a municipality located in the province of Badajoz, Extremadura, Spain. According to the 2005 census (INE), the municipality has a population of 5347 inhabitants.

It has a lot of granite around and quarries are its first economic motor.

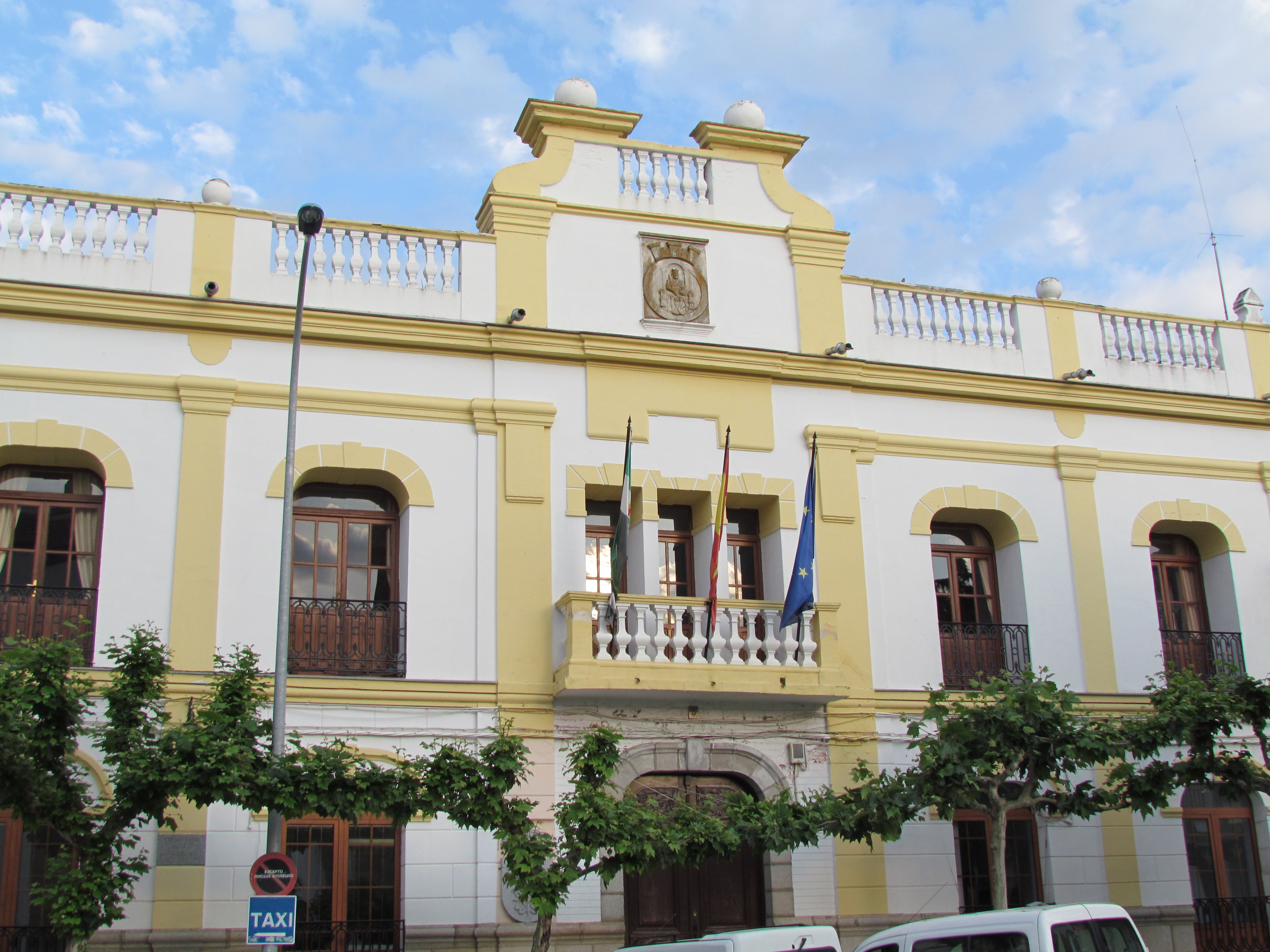
Town Hall of Quintana de la Serena

== See also ==
- List of municipalities in Badajoz
