= Villa de Don Fadrique =

La Villa de Don Fadrique
- Municipality
- Flag Coat of arms

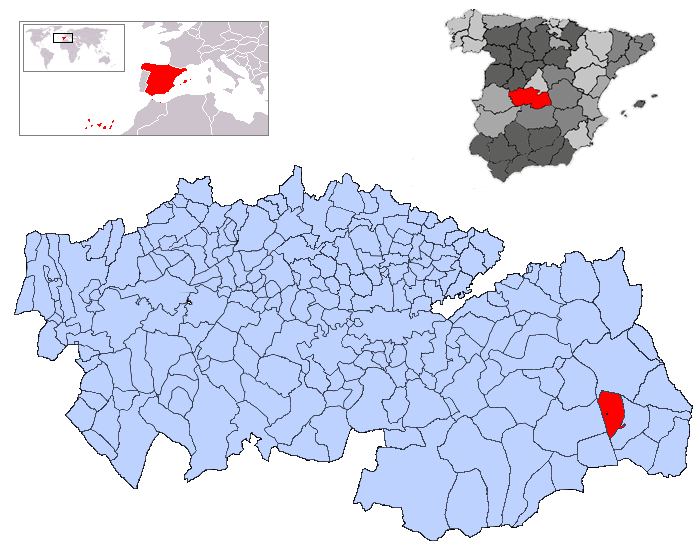

- Location in Spain
- Coordinates: 39°36′54″N 3°13′24″W
- Country: Spain
- Autonomous community: Castile-La Mancha
- Province: Toledo
- Comarca: La Mancha
- Judicial district: Quintanar de la Orden
- Founded: See text

Government
  - Alcalde: Juan Agustín González Checa (2007)

Area
  - Total: 83 km^{2} (32 sq mi)
- Elevation: 671 m (2,201 ft)

Population (2025-01-01)
  - Total: 3,519
  - Density: 42/km^{2} (110/sq mi)
- Demonym(s): Fadriqueño, ña Donfadriqueño, ña Pobleño, ña
- Time zone: UTC+1 (CET)
  - Summer (DST): UTC+2 (CEST)
- Postal code: 45850
- Dialing code: 925
- Official language(s): Castilian

La Villa de Don Fadrique is a town and municipality in the province of Toledo, Spain. The town is named after Fadrique Alfonso of Castile who conceded the "Carta-Puebla" (the document reporting the foundation of the town and granting the special privileges to it) on April 25, 1343. Prior to that date the small group of houses was under Corral de Almaguer administration.

According to the official data, La Villa de Don Fadrique has a total population of 4,214 inhabitants and a surface of 83 km². The population density was 49/km², in 2001. The economy of the town is based on doors manufacturing and agriculture.

La Villa de don Fadrique is in the southeast of the Toledo province between Cigüela and Riánsares rivers. Buildings of interest are Nuestra Señora de la Asunción church, built in classical style, and Laras House.

The mayor of La Villa de Don Fadrique is Mr. Juan Agustín González Checa of the ruling Partido Socialista Obrero. The Partido Socialista Obrero has 4 municipal councillors while the Partido Popular has 4 and Izquierda Unida has 3.

In the 2004 Spanish General Election the Partido Popular got 40.2% of the vote in La Villa de Don Fadrique, the Partido Socialista Obrero got 37.4% and Izquierda Unida got 21.0%.

This municipality was a stronghold of the Spanish Communist Party, (PCE) before the Spanish Civil War and some revolutionary riots took place in 1932 which required the intervention of the Guardia Civil. Because of this background it was even known as "Little Russia" during the Cold War years. Currently, it continues to be a regional stronghold of Izquierda Unida, which follows the traditions of PCE.

== External links (in Spanish) ==
- La Villa de Don Fadrique, La Villa de Don Fadrique Municipal Government Site.
- La Villa de Don Fadrique in Google Maps
- General election results (2004) in La Villa de Don Fadrique
