= Carlos Cuesta (football manager) =

Spanish football manager

Personal information
- Full name: Carlos Cuesta García
- Date of birth: 29 July 1995 (age 31)
- Place of birth: Palma, Spain
- Height: 1.80 m (5 ft 11 in)
- Position: Midfielder

Youth career
- –2013: Santa Catalina

Senior career*
Years	Team	Apps	(Gls)
2011–2013	Santa Catalina	13	(0)

Managerial career
- 2020–2025: Arsenal (assistant)
- 2025–2026: Parma
- * Club domestic league appearances and goals

Carlos Cuesta García (born 29 July 1995) is a Spanish professional football manager who previously served as the head coach of Serie A club Parma.

== Career ==
=== Playing and early career ===
Born in Palma de Mallorca, Balearic Islands, Cuesta played for Santa Catalina as a youth, and made his first team debut during the 2011–12 season in the Primera Regional Preferente; at that time, he was already a manager of the club's prebenjamín squads. He retired from playing at the age of 18, after deciding to switch permanently to a managerial role.

Cuesta later managed the youth academy of Spanish side Atlético Madrid. In 2018, he was appointed assistant manager of the youth academy of Juventus in Italy.

=== Arsenal ===
On 28 August 2020, Cuesta was appointed assistant coach to Mikel Arteta at Premier League club Arsenal. He was part of Arteta's coaching team that guided the Gunners to win the 2020 FA Community Shield on penalties against Liverpool the following day, and win the 2023 FA Community Shield on penalties against Manchester City on 6 August 2023.

Cuesta worked alongside assistant coaches Albert Stuivenberg and Miguel Molina, set-piece coach Nicolas Jover and goalkeeping coach Iñaki Caña. He has previously worked with assistant coach Steve Round and set-piece coach Andreas Georgson at Arsenal.

=== Parma ===
On 19 June 2025, Cuesta became the head coach of Serie A side Parma, signing a contract until 2027. On his professional debut on 17 August, he led the side to a 2–0 win over Pescara in the Coppa Italia. After losing three of their first five league matches during the 2026-27 season, it was announced on 27 September, 2026 that Cuesta had left the club by mutual agreement.

== Managerial statistics ==
As of match played 20 September 2026

Managerial record by team and tenure
Team	Nat.	From	To	Record							
Team	Nat.	From	To	G	W	D	L	GF	GA	GD	Win %
Parma	(Italy)	19 June 2025	27 September 2026	48	14	14	20	39	59	−20	29.17
Total				48	14	14	20	39	59	−20	29.17
