= Andreas Georgson =

Swedish football coach and former player and executive (born 1982)

Personal information
- Full name: Karl Eric Andreas Georgson
- Date of birth: 21 February 1982 (age 44)
- Place of birth: Lomma, Sweden
- Position: Centre-back

Team information
- Current team: Tottenham Hotspur (assistant coach); Sweden (assistant head coach)

Youth career
- GIF Nike

Senior career*
Years	Team	Apps	(Gls)
- GIF Nike
- Rosengård

Managerial career
- 2022: Malmö (caretaker)
- 2023–2024: Lillestrøm
- * Club domestic league appearances and goals

Karl Eric Andreas Georgson (born 21 February 1982) is a Swedish professional football coach and former executive and player. He is assistant coach of Premier League club Tottenham Hotspur and assistant head coach of the Sweden national team.

== Playing career ==
Born in Lomma, Skåne, Georgson started his career at hometown club GIF Nike, playing for the youth team before captaining the first-team. He also played for Rosengård and worked in the Malmö academy during his playing career.

== Coaching career ==
=== Malmö ===
Georgson began his coaching career at Malmö in 2006 and went on to hold various roles including head of youth scouting, head of methodology in the academy, under-17 head coach; he was the assistant head coach from 2018 to 2019. Following Uwe Rösler's suspension, Georgson stood in as Malmö manager in a 4–0 win against Örebro in November 2018.

=== Brentford ===
Georgson joined Brentford as the Head of Set Pieces and Individual Developments in November 2019 under head coach Thomas Frank. Georgson was noted for playing a pivotal role in Brentford's set piece efficiency, using a data-driven model for improvement.

=== Arsenal ===
After less than a year at Brentford, Georgson moved to Arsenal in August 2020 under head coach Mikel Arteta, working alongside assistant coaches Albert Stuivenberg, Steve Round, Carlos Cuesta and Miguel Molina, and goalkeeping coach Iñaki Caña. He left the club in the summer of 2021, and was replaced by set piece coach Nicolas Jover.

=== Return to Malmö ===
Georgson was the caretaker manager of Malmö from July to September 2022, and later served as the sporting director before leaving the club in August 2023.

=== Southampton ===
Georgson became a set piece coach at Southampton under manager Russell Martin in August 2023. He left the club in December 2023.

=== Lillestrøm ===
Georgson became head coach of Lillestrøm in January 2024, signing a three-year contract and succeeding caretaker manager Eirik Bakke.

=== Manchester United ===
Georgson became a set piece coach at Manchester United in July 2024.

=== Tottenham Hotspur ===
On 12 June 2025, it was announced that Georgson had joined Tottenham Hotspur as assistant coach, following the appointment of former Brentford head coach Thomas Frank.

== Executive career ==
=== Malmö ===
In 2021, Georgson left Arsenal to rejoin Malmö, where he became the club's sporting manager under sporting director Daniel Andersson. His role included management, strategy, development, player and leader recruitment and analysis. He became sporting director following Andersson's departure in January 2022.
