= Víctor de Baunbag =

Cameroonian footballer (born 2000)

Personal information
- Full name: Víctor Christopher de Baunbag
- Date of birth: 5 August 2000 (age 26)
- Place of birth: Madrid, Spain
- Height: 1.91 m (6 ft 3 in)
- Position: Forward

Team information
- Current team: Portmany

Youth career
- Mallorca

Senior career*
Years	Team	Apps	(Gls)
2018–2023	Mallorca B	48	(17)
2019	Mallorca	1	(0)
2019–2020	→ Cornellà (loan)	11	(0)
2020–2021	→ Langreo (loan)	15	(1)
2024	Felanitx	10	(4)
2025–	Portmany	4	(0)
- * Club domestic league appearances and goals as of 2 November 2025

Víctor Christopher de Baunbag (born 5 August 2000) is a professional footballer who plays as a forward for Tercera Federación club Portmany. Born in Spain, he is a citizen of Cameroon.

== Club career ==
Born in Madrid to Cameroonian parents, de Baunbag was a RCD Mallorca youth graduate, and renewed his contract until 2023 on 8 May 2018.

De Baunbag made his senior debut with the reserves on 21 April 2018, playing the last 18 minutes in a 1–1 Tercera División away draw against UD Ibiza. He scored his first goal on 5 May in a 1–0 away routing of UD Collerense, and scored a hat-trick in a 6–0 home thrashing of CD Llosetense on 2 December.

On 8 June 2019, after scoring 15 goals for the B-team, de Baunbag made his professional debut by coming on as a late substitute for Sergio Buenacasa in a 0–0 away draw against Extremadura UD in the Segunda División.
