= Uruguay Cup (Balearic Islands) =

Former annual association football competition in the Balearic Islands

Copa Uruguai
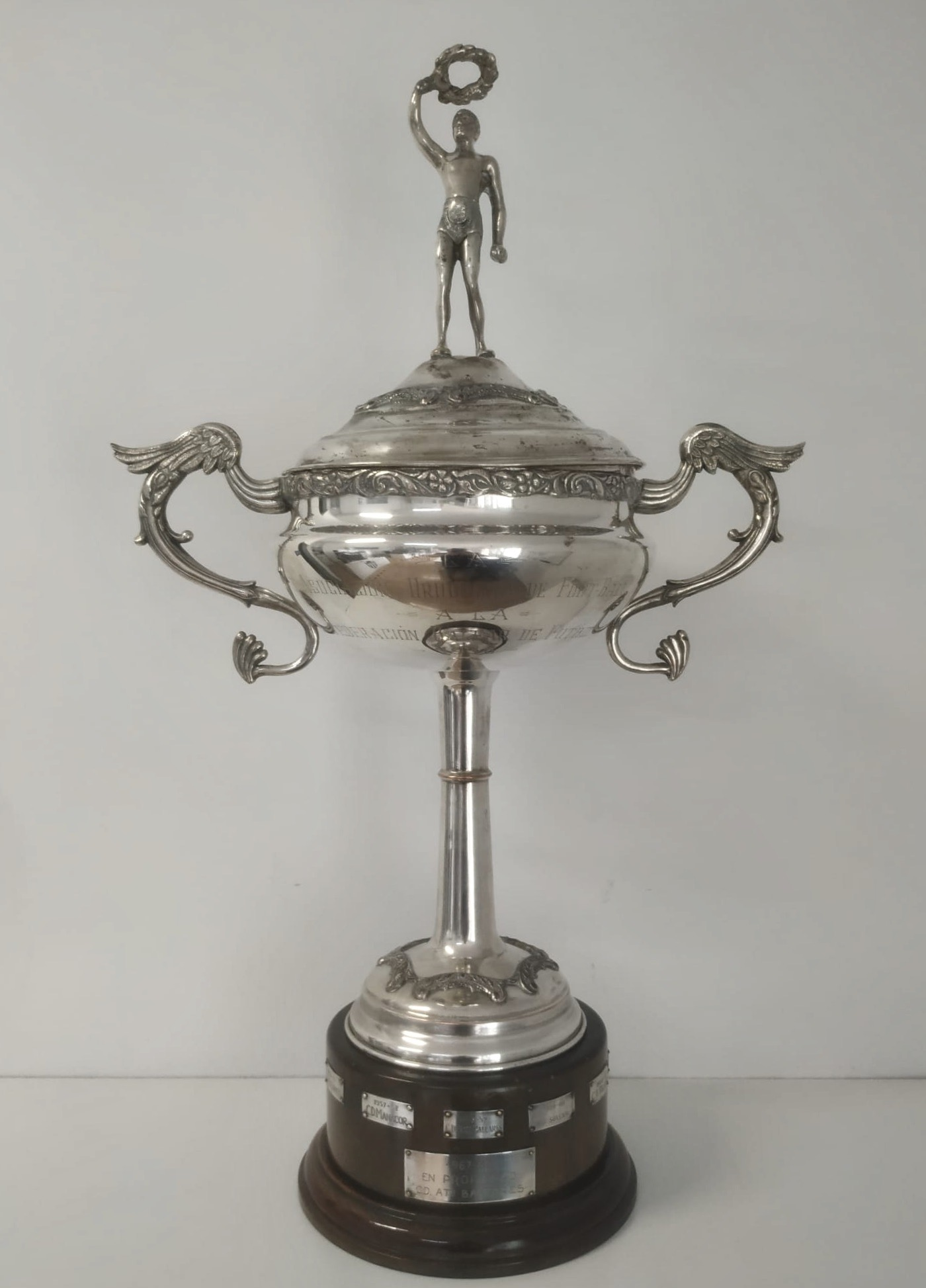
- Organiser(s): FFIB
- Founded: 1956
- Abolished: 1968
- Region: Balearic Islands, Spain
- Last champions: CD Atlético Baleares
- Most championships: CD Atlético Baleares (4)

The Uruguay Cup (Catalan: Copa Uruguai, Spanish: Copa Uruguay) was an annual football tournament organised by the Balearic Islands Football Federation between 1956 and 1968. It was disputed by the strongest football teams of the Balearic Islands.

== History ==
The idea for the tournament was born thanks to the donation of a trophy by the honorary consul of Uruguay in Palma to the Balearic Islands Football Federation. The organising body decided to create a tournament of which the gifted trophy would be the prize and established that the trophy could be earned when a team won three successive editions or five editions in total of the tournament, which would be called the Copa Uruguai. In total, 12 editions were disputed before the trophy was won by CD Atlético Baleares.

Throughout the years, the tournament was organised in different ways: a single-match knock-out stage (first season), a group phase followed by a knock-out stage (from 1957 to 1960), a single group (from 1961 to 1964), and a group phase followed by a final (1965 to 1968). In the first editions, all participating teams were from Mallorca; by the 1962–63 season, a team from Ibiza participated, SD Ibiza; and by the 1964–65 season, teams from Menorca also participated. This meant that the competition acquired a Balearic character.

Finally, CD Atlético Baleares won the trophy after winning four editions, of which the three last ones successively. This meant that the club obtained the physical trophy and that the competition ended.

In 2024, CD Atlético Baleares announced the recovery of the Uruguay Cup, but instead of maintaining its original format, it was introduced as a friendly pre-season match.

== Editions ==
Edition	Season	Champion	Runner-up
I edition	1956–57	CE Felanitx	CE Espanya
II edition	1957–58	CE Manacor	UE Alaró
III edition	1958–59	CD Atlético Baleares	CE Felanitx
IV edition	1959–60	CF Sóller	UD Poblense
V edition	1960–61	CE Felanitx	UE Alaró
VI edition	1961–62	UE Alaró	CE Felanitx
VII edition	1962–63	SD Ibiza	CE Manacor
VIII edition	1963–64	CD Soledad	CD Atlético Baleares
IX edition	1964–65	UD Mahón	CD Atlético Baleares
X edition	1965–66	CD Atlético Baleares	CE Menorca
XI edition	1966–67	CD Atlético Baleares	Atlètic de Ciutadella
XII edition	1967–68	CD Atlético Baleares	UD Mahón

== List of winners ==
- With 4 trophies: CD Atlético Baleares (1959, 1966, 1967, 1968)
- With 2 trophies: CE Felanitx (1957, 1961)
- With 1 trophy: UE Alaró (1962), CE Manacor (1958), UD Mahón (1965), CF Sóller (1960), SD Ibiza (1963), and CD Soledad (1964)

== Bibliography ==
- AA. VV. (1991). Gran Enciclopèdia de Mallorca [Big Encyclopedia of Mallorca] (in Catalan). Vol. 19. Palma: Promomallorca. ISBN 84-86617-02-2.
- García Gargallo, Manuel (2021-05-01), "La Copa Uruguay de fútbol en Baleares. Un torneo olvidado", Cuadernos de fútbol, no. 131, CIHEFE, ISSN 1989-6379
