= Assane Ndiaye =

Spanish footballer

Personal information
- Full name: Assane Ndiaye Dione
- Date of birth: 10 October 1999 (age 27)
- Place of birth: Palma, Spain
- Height: 1.77 m (5 ft 10 in)
- Position: Midfielder

Team information
- Current team: Cultural Leonesa
- Number: 8

Youth career
- Son Oliva
- San Pedro
- Sporting Palma

Senior career*
Years	Team	Apps	(Gls)
2018–2019	Atlético Rafal	34	(3)
2019–2020	Llosetense	24	(2)
2020–2021	Felanitx	26	(0)
2021–2022	Extremadura B	15	(3)
2022	Extremadura	4	(1)
2022	Zamora	4	(0)
2022–2023	Diocesano	17	(2)
2023–2024	Atlético Madrid B	43	(4)
2024–2025	Andorra	16	(0)
2025	Cartagena	16	(0)
2025–2026	Estrela da Amadora	0	(0)
2025–2026	→ Farense (loan)	20	(0)
2026–	Cultural Leonesa	3	(0)
- * Club domestic league appearances and goals as of 13 September 2026

Assane Ndiaye Dione (born 10 October 1999) is a Spanish professional footballer who plays as a midfielder for Primera Federación club Cultural Leonesa.

== Career ==
Born in Palma de Mallorca, Balearic Islands to Senegalese parents, Ndiaye played for hometown sides CD Son Oliva, ADC San Pedro and Sporting Ciutat de Palma as a youth before signing for Regional Preferente side CD Atlético Rafal on 1 August 2018. After being a regular starter, he joined CD Llosetense in Tercera División in the following year, before moving to fellow league team CE Felanitx in August 2020.

In August 2021, Ndiaye agreed to a deal with Extremadura UD, being initially assigned to the reserves in Tercera División RFEF. The following January, he was promoted to the main squad in Primera División RFEF as the club's financial problems worsened and most of the first team players left, and scored on his debut in a 1–0 away win over Real Unión.

On 1 February 2022, Ndiaye joined fellow third division side Zamora CF. On 12 July, after being rarely used, he signed for Segunda Federación side CD Diocesano.

On 31 January 2023, Ndiaye signed an 18-month deal with another reserve team, Atlético Madrid B also in division four. He helped the side to achieve promotion to Primera Federación, and was regularly used in the 2023–24 season before agreeing to a two-year contract with FC Andorra on 30 July 2024.

On 3 February 2025, Ndiaye joined Segunda División side FC Cartagena for six months, after terminating his link with Andorra. He made his professional debut six days later, coming on as a second-half substitute for Rafael Núñez in a 5–2 away loss to Cádiz CF.

On 21 July 2025, Ndiaye signed with Estrela da Amadora in Portuguese Primeira Liga. On 29 August 2025, he was loaned out by Estrela to Farense in the second tier for the 2025–26 season.

On 4 July 2026, Ndiaye returned to Spain and joined Cultural Leonesa in Primera Federación for one season, with an option for a second year.
