= Nicolas Jover =

French football coach (born 1981)

Personal information
- Date of birth: 28 October 1981 (age 45)
- Place of birth: Berlin, Germany

Team information
- Current team: Arsenal (set-piece coach)

Nicolas Jover (born 28 October 1981) is a German-born French football coach who is currently the set-piece coach of Premier League club Arsenal.

== Coaching career ==
Born in Berlin, Germany, Jover was raised in France. He moved to Quebec, Canada in his early twenties to study for a sports degree at the University of Sherbrooke, courtesy of the link between University of Montpellier and Sherbrooke. During his time there, Jover drew on the influence of North American sports such as the National Football League. After studying for a master's degree, he joined Dynamik de Sherbrooke, a local amateur club, as their technical director.

Jover returned to France and joined Montpellier as a video analyst in 2009. He helped them claim their first Ligue 1 title in the 2011–12 season, which saw Montpellier boss René Girard received UNFP Ligue 1 Manager of the Year and striker Olivier Giroud was named the league's top scorer by the Ligue de Football Professionnel. While working at Montpellier, he also took a match analyst role for Croatia for a brief spell in 2013.

Jover moved to England as a set-piece coach of Dean Smith at Brentford from July 2016, and was part of Smith's successor Thomas Frank's coaching team until June 2019. In the 2018–19 season he shared the same office with goalkeeping coach Iñaki Caña, who would join Arsenal in December 2019.

In July 2019, Manchester City appointed Jover as an assistant to Pep Guardiola, specializing in set-pieces, on the recommendation of Mikel Arteta who was the No.2 at the Etihad. Arteta left Manchester City for the Arsenal's head coach job in December 2019. In the 2020–21 season, Jover helped Manchester City claim the Premier League title and reach the Champions League final. He left his role in June 2021, when his contract expired at the end of the month.

On 5 July 2021, Jover was appointed as set-piece coach to manager Mikel Arteta at Arsenal, working alongside assistant coaches Albert Stuivenberg, Steve Round, Carlos Cuesta and Miguel Molina, and goalkeeping coach Iñaki Caña. In the 2023–24 season with Jover's help, Arsenal scored twenty set-piece goals (excluding penalties) in the Premier League, the most in the division. Sixteen of those came from corners, matching the record in a single Premier League campaign.
