= Kike Echávarri =

Spanish footballer

Personal information
- Full name: Enrique Javier Montesinos Echávarri
- Date of birth: 14 May 1994 (age 32)
- Place of birth: Palma, Spain
- Height: 1.87 m (6 ft 2 in)
- Position: Centre back

Team information
- Current team: Constància

Youth career
- Mallorca

Senior career*
Years	Team	Apps	(Gls)
2013–2014	Zamora B		
2014–2015	Génova	29	(1)
2015–2016	Esporles	12	(0)
2016–2017	San José	20	(0)
2017	Elche B	11	(0)
2017–2018	Extremadura	1	(0)
2018	→ Córdoba B (loan)	5	(0)
2019–	Constància	9	(0)
- * Club domestic league appearances and goals as of 19:18, 20 February 2020 (UTC)

Enrique 'Kike' Javier Montesinos Echávarri (born 14 May 1994) is a Spanish footballer who plays as a central defender for CE Constància.

== Club career ==
Born in Palma, Mallorca, Balearic Islands, Echávarri was a RCD Mallorca youth graduate, and made his senior debut with Zamora CF's reserves in 2013, in the regional leagues. After representing lower league sides CD Génova and CE Esporles, he moved abroad for the first time in his career after agreeing to a contract with Bolivian club Club Deportivo San José on 18 January 2016.

Echávarri made his professional debut on 13 March 2016, starting in a 1–1 away draw against Nacional Potosí. On 28 September, he received a straight red card in a 0–3 loss at Club Blooming.

On 5 January 2017, Echávarri returned to his home country and signed for Elche CF Ilicitano in the fourth level. After featuring sparingly, he moved to Segunda División B club Extremadura UD on 8 July.
