= Carlos Cuesta =

Carlos Cuesta may refer to:

- Carlos Cuesta (footballer), Colombian footballer
- Carlos Cuesta (football manager), Spanish football manager
