= CE Espanya =

Espanya de Llucmajor
- Full name: Club Esportiu Espanya
- Founded: 1939
- Ground: Municipal, Llucmajor, Balearic Islands, Spain
- Capacity: 1,000
- President: Josep Mòjer
- Manager: Guillermo Roig
- League: Preferente Regional – Mallorca
- 2025–26: Preferente Regional – Mallorca, 6th of 18
Home colours	Away colours

Club Esportiu Espanya (Club Deportivo España in Spanish), known as Espanya de Llucmajor or España de Llucmajor, is a Spanish football team based in Llucmajor, Mallorca, in the Balearic Islands. Founded in 1939, they play in Preferente Regional – Mallorca, holding home matches at Camp de Futbol Municipal de Llucmajor, with a capacity of 1,000 people.

== History ==
Founded in 1939 as Club Deportivo España, the club immediately merged with Club Esportiu Llucmajor (founded in 1932).

=== Club background ===
- Club Deportivo España (1939–1996)
- Club Esportiu España (1996–2006)
- Club Esportiu Espanya (2006–)

== Season to season ==
Season	Tier	Division	Place	Copa del Rey
1939–40	6	2ª Reg.	1st	
1940–41	4	1ª Reg.	5th	
1941–42	3	1ª Reg.	5th	
1942–43	3	1ª Reg.	4th	
1943–44	4	1ª Reg.	1st	First round
1944–45	4	1ª Reg.	5th	
1945–46	4	1ª Reg.	4th	
1946–47	4	1ª Reg.	6th	
1947–48	4	1ª Reg.	4th	
1948–49	4	1ª Reg.	10th	
1949–50	4	1ª Reg.		
1950–51	4	1ª Reg.	4th	
1951–52	4	1ª Reg.	3rd	
1952–53	4	1ª Reg.	6th	
1953–54	4	1ª Reg.	6th	
1954–55	4	1ª Reg.	2nd	
1955–56	3	3ª	5th	
1956–57	3	3ª	8th	
1957–58	3	3ª	6th	
1958–59	3	3ª	13th	

Season	Tier	Division	Place	Copa del Rey
1959–60	3	3ª	14th	
1960–61	4	1ª Reg.	5th	
1961–62	4	1ª Reg.	4th	
1962–63	DNP			
1963–64	DNP			
1964–65	DNP			
1965–66	4	1ª Reg.	3rd	
1966–67	4	1ª Reg.	2nd	
1967–68	4	1ª Reg.	2nd	
1968–69	4	1ª Reg.	8th	
1969–70	4	1ª Reg.	16th	
1970–71	4	1ª Reg.	7th	
1971–72	4	1ª Reg.	8th	
1972–73	4	Reg. Pref.	10th	
1973–74	4	Reg. Pref.	14th	
1974–75	4	Reg. Pref.	15th	
1975–76	4	Reg. Pref.	4th	
1976–77	4	Reg. Pref.	9th	
1977–78	5	Reg. Pref.	11th	
1978–79	5	Reg. Pref.	6th	

Season	Tier	Division	Place	Copa del Rey
1979–80	4	3ª	12th	First round
1980–81	4	3ª	18th	
1981–82	5	Reg. Pref.	2nd	
1982–83	4	3ª	18th	
1983–84	5	Reg. Pref.	13th	
1984–85	5	Reg. Pref.	17th	
1985–86	6	1ª Reg.	5th	
1986–87	6	1ª Reg.	4th	
1987–88	5	Reg. Pref.	15th	
1988–89	5	Reg. Pref.	12th	
1989–90	5	Reg. Pref.	12th	
1990–91	5	Reg. Pref.	2nd	
1991–92	4	3ª	18th	
1992–93	5	Reg. Pref.	2nd	
1993–94	5	Reg. Pref.	7th	
1994–95	5	Reg. Pref.	4th	
1995–96	5	Reg. Pref.	10th	
1996–97	5	Reg. Pref.	3rd	
1997–98	5	Reg. Pref.	4th	
1998–99	5	Reg. Pref.	14th	

Season	Tier	Division	Place	Copa del Rey
1999–2000	5	Reg. Pref.	4th	
2000–01	4	3ª	17th	
2001–02	4	3ª	19th	
2002–03	5	Reg. Pref.	9th	
2003–04	5	Reg. Pref.	8th	
2004–05	5	Reg. Pref.	17th	
2005–06	5	Reg. Pref.	18th	
2006–07	6	1ª Reg.	9th	
2007–08	6	1ª Reg.	13th	
2008–09	6	1ª Reg.	5th	
2009–10	6	1ª Reg.	1st	
2010–11	5	Reg. Pref.	2nd	
2011–12	4	3ª	15th	
2012–13	4	3ª	18th	
2013–14	5	Reg. Pref.	12th	
2014–15	5	Reg. Pref.	14th	
2015–16	5	Reg. Pref.	19th	
2016–17	6	1ª Reg.	15th	
2017–18	6	1ª Reg.	5th	
2018–19	6	1ª Reg.	17th	

Season	Tier	Division	Place	Copa del Rey
2019–20	6	1ª Reg.	16th	
2020–21	6	1ª Reg.	5th	
2021–22	7	1ª Reg.	6th	
2022–23	6	Reg. Pref.	11th	
2023–24	6	Reg. Pref.	13th	
2024–25	7	Pref. Reg.	9th	
2025–26	7	Pref. Reg.		

- 13 seasons in Tercera División
