= CF Virgen de Lluc =

Spanish association football club

Virgen de Lluc
- Full name: Club de Fútbol Virgen de Lluc
- Nicknames: La Virgen; Verge de Lluc
- Founded: 1969
- Ground: Son Malferit, Palma de Mallorca, Balearic Islands, Spain
- Capacity: 120
- 2024–25: Segunda Regional – Mallorca – Group A, 6th of 19
Home colours	Away colours

Club de Fútbol Virgen de Lluc (popularly Verge de Lluc) is a football club from Palma (Balearic Islands, Spain), founded in 1969.

The club was one of the most representative entities in the neighborhood, of a humble and popular nature. It was created at Mare de Déu de Lluc neighborhood, built in 1957 on the outskirts of Palma as a group of social housing, basically populated by peninsular immigrant population.

== History ==
Initially there was a children's team (1958-59 season) and a youth team (1961-62 season), but it was not until 1969 that the club achieved stability. Then it began to compete his first men's team and, since 1970, the youth and women's teams. Her best years came in the early 1970s, with the women's team, and in the early 1990s, when the men's team reached Regional Preferente.

In the mid-1990s the club's activity began to decline due to the poor condition of its playing field. From 1997 first team stopped competing and in 2002 the club was sportingly inactive due to lack of adequate playing field. Between 2014 and 2016 an attempt was made to regain the club's activity with grassroots football teams, but the initiative was unsuccessful.

Despite everything, the club did not disappear and was able to maintain a basic structure. It resumed activity during the 2024-25 season, following the reopening of its pitch in the summer of 2024.

== Season to season ==
Season	Tier	Division	Place	Copa del Rey
1969–70	5	2ª Reg.	11th	
1970–71	5	2ª Reg.	3rd	
1971–72	5	2ª Reg.	13th	
1972–73	7	3ª Reg.	2nd	
1973–74	6	2ª Reg.	7th	
1974–75	6	2ª Reg.	2nd	
1975–76	5	1ª Reg.	5th	
1976–77	5	1ª Reg.	16th	
1977–78	7	2ª Reg.	11th	
1978–79	7	2ª Reg.	12th	
1979–80	7	2ª Reg.	9th	
1980–81	7	2ª Reg.	14th	
1981–82	7	2ª Reg.	1st	
1982–83	6	1ª Reg.	4th	
1983–84	6	1ª Reg.	5th	
1984–85	6	1ª Reg.	10th	
1985–86	6	1ª Reg.	8th	
1986–87	6	1ª Reg.	6th	
1987–88	6	1ª Reg.	10th	
1988–89	6	1ª Reg.	6th	

Season	Tier	Division	Place	Copa del Rey
1989–90	6	1ª Reg.	14th	
1990–91	6	1ª Reg.	4th	
1991–92	5	Reg. Pref.	10th	
1992–93	5	Reg. Pref.	19th	
1993–94	6	1ª Reg.	13th	
1994–95	6	1ª Reg.	5th	
1995–96	6	1ª Reg.	8th	
1996–97	6	1ª Reg.	10th	
1997–2024	DNP			
2024–25	9	2ª Reg.	6th	

== Honours ==
- Segunda Regional
  - Winners (1): 1981-82
  - Runners-up (1): 1974-75
- Tercera Regional
  - Runners-up (1): 1972-73
- Mallorca Women Championship
  - Winners (1): 1971

== Women's team ==
The club has a women's section, becoming one of the oldest clubs in competition in Balearic Islands. The club achieved great importance in the early 1970s thanks to women's team, one of the first ones organized in Mallorca and the one with the greatest sporting potential in those years when the competition was organized for the first time in Balearic Islands, despite which was not consolidated. The team won the Championship of Mallorca organized in the 1970–71 season, against CE Constància, and remained the most representative team until the disappearance of women's football in Balearic Islands, around 1973.

With the recovery of the club's sports activity following the reopening of the playing field, the women's team was also recovered, which was active from the 2024-25 season.

== Stadium ==
The club's playing field, formerly known as Campo de Fútbol José Sempere, is located in the same neighborhood of Mare de Déu de Lluc. It was privately owned until 2002, when Palma City Council acquired it for reforming the field; which was very dilapidated and had already ceased to function due to its poor condition.

Some maintenance work was undertaken in 2015 and reform was planned, but nothing was done. In May 2018, the first phase of reform was executed with the demolition of outer wall, bleachers and construction of a new wall. The second phase was halted and was not completed until 10 July 2024, when the field was reopened.
