= Alejandro Pajurek =

Argentine professional footballer

Personal information
- Full name: Pablo Alejandro Pajurek
- Date of birth: 26 June 1992 (age 34)
- Place of birth: Córdoba, Argentina
- Height: 1.84 m (6 ft 0 in)
- Position: Centre-back

Youth career
- Boca Juniors

Senior career*
Years	Team	Apps	(Gls)
2013–2014	Sarmiento	5	(0)
2015	9 de Julio	1	(0)
2016	Ferro Carril Oeste	6	(0)
2016–2017	Sportivo Las Parejas	12	(0)
2017–2018	Deportivo Mandiyú	3	(0)
2019	Deportivo Español	0	(0)
2019	Almafuerte Córdoba		
2020	La Jonquera	2	(0)
2020	Llagostera	0	(0)
2020	Atlètic Lleida	2	(0)
2020–2021	Inter Ibiza	16	(2)
2021–2022	UE Sant Josep	29	(3)
- * Club domestic league appearances and goals as of 20:25, 15 August 2022 (UTC)

Pablo Alejandro Pajurek (born 26 June 1992) is an Argentine professional footballer who plays as a centre-back.

== Career ==
Pajurek, from Boca Juniors, started his career with Sarmiento. He played in his first professional match on 25 November 2013 versus Banfield, which was followed by a further five appearances in the 2013–14 season; which included a Copa Argentina encounter with Talleres. Pajurek completed a move to Torneo Federal A's 9 de Julio in 2015. He appeared again against Talleres for his 9 de Julio debut on 23 March, for what was his only game for them. 2016 saw Pajurek join Ferro Carril Oeste, where he'd feature seven times; notably receiving two red cards. He also scored his first goal; versus Unión Aconquija in the play-offs.

Further stints in Torneo Federal A with Sportivo Las Parejas and Deportivo Mandiyú followed across 2016–17 and 2017–18, with the latter ending with them being relegated to the fourth tier. In January 2019, Pajurek agreed terms with Deportivo Español of Primera B Metropolitana. No matches came in the succeeding months, with Pajurek subsequently leaving to Almafuerte Córdoba of Liga Riotercerense in March. In February 2020, Pajurek moved abroad to Spain as he joined Primera Catalana side La Jonquera. He made appearances against Rubí and Lloret, prior to departing in June to Segunda División B with Llagostera. Shortly after, in August 2020, he moved to Atlètic Lleida, where he made two appearances in October, prior to joining Inter Ibiza, where he played 16 games and scored two goal from November 2021 to the end of the 2020–21 season. In the 2021–22 season, he turned out for UE Sant Josep.

== Career statistics ==
As of 28 June 2020.

Appearances and goals by club, season and competition
Club	Season	League			Cup		League Cup		Continental		Other		Total	
Club	Season	Division	Apps	Goals	Apps	Goals	Apps	Goals	Apps	Goals	Apps	Goals	Apps	Goals
Sarmiento	2013–14	Primera B Nacional	5	0	1	0	—		—		0	0	6	0
Sarmiento	2014	Primera B Nacional	0	0	0	0	—		—		0	0	0	0
Sarmiento	Total		5	0	1	0	—		—		0	0	6	0
9 de Julio	2015	Torneo Federal A	1	0	0	0	—		—		0	0	1	0
Ferro Carril Oeste	2016	Torneo Federal A	6	0	0	0	—		—		1 (Note: Appearance(s) in the Torneo Federal A play-offs)	1	7	1
Sportivo Las Parejas	2016–17	Torneo Federal A	12	0	0	0	—		—		0	0	12	0
Deportivo Mandiyú	2017–18	Torneo Federal A	3	0	0	0	—		—		0	0	3	0
Deportivo Español	2018–19	Primera B Metropolitana	0	0	0	0	—		—		0	0	0	0
La Jonquera	2019–20	Primera Catalana	2	0	0	0	—		—		0	0	2	0
Llagostera	2020–21	Segunda División B	0	0	0	0	—		—		0	0	0	0
Career total			29	0	1	0	—		—		1	1	31	1
