= CE Ferreries =

Ferreries
- Full name: Club Esportiu Ferreries
- Founded: 1923 (as CD Ferrerías)
- Ground: Camp Sant Bartomeu, Ferreries, Menorca, Balearic Islands, Spain
- Capacity: 1,000
- President: Jose Allés Pons
- Manager: Miquel Capó
- League: División de Honor – Menorca
- 2025–26: División de Honor – Menorca, 2nd of 11
Home colours	Away colours

Club Esportiu Ferreries is a Spanish football team based in Ferreries, Menorca, in the autonomous community of Balearic Islands. Founded in 1923, it plays in División de Honor – Menorca, holding home games at Camp Sant Bartomeu, with a capacity of 1,000 people.

== Season to season ==
Season	Tier	Division	Place	Copa del Rey
1923–1946	—	Regional	—	
1946–47	4	1ª Reg.	5th	
1947–48	4	1ª Reg.	8th	
1948–49	DNP			
1949–50	DNP			
1950–51	4	1ª Reg.	6th	
1951–52	4	1ª Reg.		
1952–1957	DNP			
1957–58	4	1ª Reg.		
1958–59	4	1ª Reg.		
1959–60	4	1ª Reg.		
1960–61	4	1ª Reg.		
1961–62	4	1ª Reg.		
1962–63	4	1ª Reg.		
1963–64	4	1ª Reg.		
1964–65	4	1ª Reg.		
1965–66	4	1ª Reg.		
1966–67	4	1ª Reg.		
1967–68	4	1ª Reg.		
1968–69	4	1ª Reg.	7th	

Season	Tier	Division	Place	Copa del Rey
1969–70	4	1ª Reg.		
1970–71	4	1ª Reg.	6th	
1971–72	4	1ª Reg.	7th	
1972–73	4	Reg. Pref.	6th	
1973–74	4	Reg. Pref.		
1974–75	4	Reg. Pref.	4th	
1975–76	4	Reg. Pref.	4th	
1976–77	4	Reg. Pref.	3rd	
1977–78	5	Reg. Pref.		
1978–79	5	Reg. Pref.		
1979–80	5	Reg. Pref.		
1980–81	5	Reg. Pref.		
1981–82	5	Reg. Pref.		
1982–83	5	Reg. Pref.		
1983–84	4	3ª	12th	
1984–85	4	3ª	9th	
1985–86	4	3ª	11th	
1986–87	4	3ª	10th	
1987–88	4	3ª	7th	
1988–89	4	3ª	12th	

Season	Tier	Division	Place	Copa del Rey
1989–90	4	3ª	10th	
1990–91	4	3ª	8th	
1991–92	4	3ª	13th	
1992–93	4	3ª	9th	
1993–94	4	3ª	17th	
1994–95	5	Reg. Pref.		
1995–96	5	Reg. Pref.		
1996–97	5	Reg. Pref.		
1997–98	4	3ª	17th	
1998–99	4	3ª	20th	
1999–2000	5	Reg. Pref.		
2000–01	5	Reg. Pref.	1st	
2001–02	5	Reg. Pref.	1st	
2002–03	5	Reg. Pref.	8th	
2003–04	5	Reg. Pref.	6th	
2004–05	5	Reg. Pref.	1st	
2005–06	5	Reg. Pref.	2nd	
2006–07	5	Reg. Pref.	2nd	
2007–08	5	Reg. Pref.	2nd	
2008–09	5	Reg. Pref.	1st	

Season	Tier	Division	Place	Copa del Rey
2009–10	4	3ª	12th	
2010–11	4	3ª	16th	
2011–12	4	3ª	19th	
2012–13	5	Reg. Pref.	2nd	
2013–14	5	Reg. Pref.	1st	
2014–15	5	Reg. Pref.	1st	
2015–16	5	Reg. Pref.	6th	
2016–17	5	Reg. Pref.	4th	
2017–18	5	Reg. Pref.	3rd	
2018–19	5	Reg. Pref.	3rd	
2019–20	5	Reg. Pref.	8th	
2020–21	5	Reg. Pref.	9th	
2021–22	6	Reg. Pref.	5th	
2022–23	6	Reg. Pref.	2nd	
2023–24	6	Reg. Pref.	4th	
2024–25	6	Div. Hon.	5th	
2025–26	6	Div. Hon.		

- 16 seasons in Tercera División
