= UD Collerense =

Spanish football club

Collerense
- Full name: Unión Deportiva Collerense
- Founded: 1983
- Ground: Estadio Municipal Coll d’en Rebassa, Palma de Mallorca, Mallorca, Spain
- Capacity: 1,000
- Chairman: (Spain) Juan Vega
- Manager: (Spain) Miguel Ángel Espadas Jurado
- League: Tercera Federación – Group 11
- 2024–25: Tercera Federación – Group 11, 14th of 18
Home colours	Away colours

Unión Deportiva Collerense is a football team based in Palma de Mallorca in the autonomous community of Balearic Islands. Founded in 1983, the team plays in Tercera Federación – Group 11. The club's home ground is Estadio Municipal Coll d’en Rebassa with a 1,000-seat capacity.

== History ==
Originally founded in 1967, UD Collerense were RCD Mallorca's reserve team for the 1981–82 and 1982–83 seasons, both in Tercera División. At conclusion of the latter campaign, the club officially became RCD Mallorca Atlético, and a new UD Collerense was formed shortly after.

== Season to season ==
Season	Tier	Division	Place	Copa del Rey
1983–84	8	3ª Reg.	1st	
1984–85	7	2ª Reg.	5th	
1983–84	7	2ª Reg.	4th	
1984–85	7	2ª Reg.	5th	
1985–86	7	2ª Reg.	4th	
1986–87	7	2ª Reg.	7th	
1987–88	7	2ª Reg.	2nd	
1988–89	6	1ª Reg.	10th	
1989–90	6	1ª Reg.	10th	
1990–91	6	1ª Reg.	6th	
1991–92	6	1ª Reg.	12th	
1992–93	6	1ª Reg.	10th	
1993–94	6	1ª Reg.	16th	
1994–95	7	2ª Reg.	10th	
1995–96	7	2ª Reg.	6th	
1996–97	7	2ª Reg.	4th	
1997–98	6	1ª Reg.	11th	
1998–99	6	1ª Reg.	7th	
1999–2000	6	1ª Reg.	1st	
2000–01	5	Reg. Pref.	17th	
2001–02	5	Reg. Pref.	10th	
2002–03	5	Reg. Pref.	7th	

Season	Tier	Division	Place	Copa del Rey
2003–04	4	3ª	11th	
2004–05	4	3ª	17th	
2005–06	4	3ª	12th	
2006–07	4	3ª	18th	
2007–08	5	Reg. Pref.	5th	
2008–09	5	Reg. Pref.	3rd	
2009–10	4	3ª	17th	
2010–11	4	3ª	10th	
2011–12	4	3ª	11th	
2012–13	4	3ª	10th	
2013–14	4	3ª	11th	
2014–15	4	3ª	13th	
2015–16	4	3ª	10th	
2016–17	4	3ª	17th	
2017–18	4	3ª	18th	
2018–19	5	Reg. Pref.	2nd	´
2019–20	4	3ª	19th	
2020–21	4	3ª	6th / 4th	
2021–22	5	3ª RFEF	10th	
2022–23	5	3ª Fed.	12th	
2023–24	5	3ª Fed.	13th	
2024–25	5	3ª Fed.	14th	

Season	Tier	Division	Place	Copa del Rey
2025–26	5	3ª Fed.		

- 15 seasons in Tercera División
- 5 seasons in Tercera Federación/Tercera División RFEF

== Women's team ==
UD Collerense Femenino are the women's section of the team. They played in the highest national league, the Primera División, between 2009 and 2016.
