= CD Génova =

Spanish association football club

Génova
- Full name: Club Deportivo Génova
- Nicknames: Azulillos, Cavernícolas, Genoveses
- Founded: 1917; 109 years ago 1989 (merger)
- Ground: Es Nou Garroveral, Palma, Mallorca, Balearic Islands, Spain
- Capacity: 800
- President: Juan Aloy Homar
- Manager: Joaquín Lomba
- League: Preferente Regional – Mallorca
- 2025–26: Primera Regional – Mallorca – Group B, 1st of 18 (champions)
- Website: genova.rafaeltuduri.com
Home colours	Away colours

Club Deportivo Génova is a football team based in Palma de Mallorca, Balearic Islands. Founded in 1917, they play in Preferente Regional – Mallorca, holding home matches at the Estadi Municipal Es Nou Garroveral, with a capacity of 800 spectators.

== History ==
Founded in 1917 by a group of young people in the neighborhood, Club Deportivo Génova had a financial crisis in the 1960s which caused the club to cease activities. In the 1970s, two clubs were founded in the city: Unió Esportiva Génova (focusing on senior football) and Club Deportivo Genovés (focusing on youth categories); both clubs merged in 1989, re-establishing CD Génova.

In 1998, Génova achieved a first-ever promotion to Tercera División.

== Season to season ==
=== CD Génova (1917–1960s) ===
Season	Tier	Division	Place	Copa del Rey
1942–43	5	3ª Reg.	4th	
1943–44	6	3ª Reg.		
1944–45	5	3ª Reg.	2nd	
1945–46	5	3ª Reg.		
1946–47	5	3ª Reg.	5th	
1947–48	6	3ª Reg.	4th	
1948–49	5	2ª Reg.	7th	
1949–50	5	3ª Reg.	5th	
1950–51	4	1ª Reg.	6th	
1951–52	5	3ª Reg.	7th	

Season	Tier	Division	Place	Copa del Rey
1952–53	5	3ª Reg.		
1953–54	5	3ª Reg.		
1954–55	5	3ª Reg.		
1955–56	6	3ª Reg.	2nd	
1956–57	4	1ª Reg.	5th	
1957–58	5	2ª Reg.	4th	
1958–59	5	2ª Reg.		
1959–60	5	2ª Reg.		
1960–61	5	2ª Reg.	3rd	

=== UE Génova (1970s–1989) ===
Season	Tier	Division	Place	Copa del Rey
1979–80	8	3ª Reg.	1st	
1980–81	7	2ª Reg.	8th	
1981–82	7	2ª Reg.	5th	
1982–83	7	2ª Reg.	1st	
1983–84	6	1ª Reg.	14th	
1984–85	6	1ª Reg.	11th	
1985–86	6	1ª Reg.	17th	
1986–87	7	2ª Reg.	3rd	
1987–88	6	1ª Reg.	15th	
1988–89	6	1ª Reg.	15th	

=== CD Génova (1989) ===
Season	Tier	Division	Place	Copa del Rey
1989–90	6	1ª Reg.	17th	
1990–91	7	2ª Reg.	2nd	
1991–92	6	1ª Reg.	1st	
1992–93	5	Reg. Pref.	11th	
1993–94	5	Reg. Pref.	4th	
1994–95	5	Reg. Pref.	8th	
1995–96	5	Reg. Pref.	13th	
1996–97	5	Reg. Pref.	9th	
1997–98	5	Reg. Pref.	1st	
1998–99	4	3ª	13th	
1999–2000	4	3ª	19th	
2000–01	5	Reg. Pref.	6th	
2001–02	5	Reg. Pref.	1st	
2002–03	4	3ª	19th	
2003–04	5	Reg. Pref.	3rd	
2004–05	5	Reg. Pref.	19th	
2005–06	6	1ª Reg.	8th	
2006–07	6	1ª Reg.	2nd	
2007–08	5	Reg. Pref.	13th	
2008–09	5	Reg. Pref.	12th	

Season	Tier	Division	Place	Copa del Rey
2009–10	5	Reg. Pref.	17th	
2010–11	5	Reg. Pref.	14th	
2011–12	5	Reg. Pref.	3rd	
2012–13	5	Reg. Pref.	6th	
2013–14	5	Reg. Pref.	11th	
2014–15	5	Reg. Pref.	10th	
2015–16	5	Reg. Pref.	7th	
2016–17	5	Reg. Pref.	14th	
2017–18	5	Reg. Pref.	13th	
2018–19	5	Reg. Pref.	13th	
2019–20	5	Reg. Pref.	3rd	
2020–21	4	3ª	11th / 9th	
2021–22	6	Reg. Pref.	9th	
2022–23	6	Reg. Pref.	15th	
2023–24	7	1ª Reg.	8th	
2024–25	8	1ª Reg.	4th	
2025–26	8	1ª Reg.	1st	
2026–27	7	Reg. Pref.		

- 4 seasons in Tercera División
