= CD Migjorn =

Migjorn
- Full name: Club Deportivo Migjorn
- Founded: 1 July 1972; 54 years ago
- Ground: Los Nogales, Es Migjorn Gran, Spain
- Capacity: 1,000
- President: Andreu Pons
- Manager: Biel Medina
- League: Tercera Federación – Group 11
- 2025–26: División de Honor – Menorca, 1st of 11 (champions)
Home colours	Away colours

Club Deportivo Migjorn is a football team based in Es Migjorn Gran, Balearic Islands. Founded in 1972, the team plays in Tercera Federación – Group 11, holding home matches at the Campo Municipal Los Nogales.

== Season to season ==
Season	Tier	Division	Place	Copa del Rey
1975–76	4	Reg. Pref.	7th	
1976–77	4	Reg. Pref.	9th	
1977–78	5	Reg. Pref.	9th	
1978–79	5	Reg. Pref.		
1979–80	5	Reg. Pref.		
1980–81	5	Reg. Pref.		
1981–82	5	Reg. Pref.		
1982–83	5	Reg. Pref.		
1983–84	5	Reg. Pref.	4th	
1984–85	5	Reg. Pref.		
1985–86	5	Reg. Pref.		
1986–87	5	Reg. Pref.		
1987–88	5	Reg. Pref.		
1988–89	5	Reg. Pref.		
1989–90	5	Reg. Pref.		
1990–91	5	Reg. Pref.		
1991–92	5	Reg. Pref.		
1992–93	5	Reg. Pref.		
1993–94	5	Reg. Pref.		
1994–95	5	Reg. Pref.		

Season	Tier	Division	Place	Copa del Rey
1995–96	5	Reg. Pref.		
1996–97	5	Reg. Pref.		
1997–98	5	Reg. Pref.		
1998–99	5	Reg. Pref.		
1999–2000	5	Reg. Pref.		
2000–01	5	Reg. Pref.	2nd	
2001–02	5	Reg. Pref.	3rd	
2002–03	5	Reg. Pref.	7th	
2003–04	5	Reg. Pref.	8th	
2004–05	5	Reg. Pref.	9th	
2005–06	5	Reg. Pref.	12th	
2006–07	5	Reg. Pref.	12th	
2007–08	5	Reg. Pref.	9th	
2008–09	5	Reg. Pref.	3rd	
2009–10	5	Reg. Pref.	5th	
2010–11	5	Reg. Pref.	3rd	
2011–12	5	Reg. Pref.	4th	
2012–13	5	Reg. Pref.	1st	
2013–14	5	Reg. Pref.	2nd	
2014–15	5	Reg. Pref.	10th	

Season	Tier	Division	Place	Copa del Rey
2015–16	5	Reg. Pref.	9th	
2016–17	5	Reg. Pref.	8th	
2017–18	5	Reg. Pref.	9th	
2018–19	5	Reg. Pref.	4th	
2019–20	5	Reg. Pref.	9th	
2020–21	5	Reg. Pref.	6th	
2021–22	6	Reg. Pref.	4th	
2022–23	6	Reg. Pref.	3rd	
2023–24	6	Reg. Pref.	1st	
2024–25	5	3ª Fed.	18th	
2025–26	6	Div. Hon.	1st	
2026–27	5	3ª Fed.		

- 2 seasons in Tercera Federación
