= UD Rotlet Molinar =

Rotlet Molinar
- Full name: Unión Deportiva Rotlet Molinar
- Founded: 1986
- Ground: Municipal, Palma de Mallorca, Balearic Islands, Spain
- Capacity: 1,500
- President: Miguel Ángel Ruiz
- Head coach: Lolo Paniza
- League: División de Honor – Mallorca
- 2025–26: Tercera Federación – Group 11, 18th of 18 (relegated)
Home colours	Away colours

Unión Deportiva Rotlet Molinar is a Spanish football team based in the town of Palma de Mallorca, in the autonomous community of the Balearic Islands. Founded in 1986, they play in División de Honor – Mallorca, holding home matches at Camp de Futbol Municipal de Rotlet-Molinar, with a capacity of 1,500 people.

== Season to season ==
Season	Tier	Division	Place	Copa del Rey
1986–87	7	2ª Reg.	10th	
1987–88	7	2ª Reg.	9th	
1988–89	7	2ª Reg.	1st	
1989–90	6	1ª Reg.	6th	
1990–91	6	1ª Reg.	5th	
1991–92	6	1ª Reg.	11th	
1992–93	6	1ª Reg.	9th	
1993–94	6	1ª Reg.	7th	
1994–95	6	1ª Reg.	4th	
1995–96	6	1ª Reg.	5th	
1996–97	6	1ª Reg.	14th	
1997–98	6	1ª Reg.	18th	
1998–99	7	2ª Reg.	14th	
1999–2000	7	2ª Reg.	9th	
2000–01	DNP			
2001–02	DNP			
2002–03	DNP			
2003–04	8	3ª Reg.	1st	
2004–05	7	2ª Reg.	14th	
2005–06	7	2ª Reg.	10th	

Season	Tier	Division	Place	Copa del Rey
2006–07	7	2ª Reg.	18th	
2007–08	8	3ª Reg.	5th	
2008–09	8	3ª Reg.	1st	
2009–10	7	2ª Reg.	6th	
2010–11	7	2ª Reg.	1st	
2011–12	6	1ª Reg.	2nd	
2012–13	5	Reg. Pref.	1st	
2013–14	4	3ª	18th	
2014–15	5	Reg. Pref.	2nd	
2015–16	4	3ª	16th	
2016–17	4	3ª	18th	
2017–18	5	Reg. Pref.	5th	
2018–19	5	Reg. Pref.	3rd	
2019–20	5	Reg. Pref.	12th	
2020–21	5	Reg. Pref.	1st	
2021–22	5	3ª RFEF	15th	
2022–23	6	Reg. Pref.	3rd	
2023–24	6	Reg. Pref.	2nd	Preliminary
2024–25	6	Div. Hon.	1st	
2025–26	5	3ª Fed.	18th	

Season	Tier	Division	Place	Copa del Rey
2026–27	6	Div. Hon.		

- 3 seasons in Tercera División
- 2 seasons in Tercera Federación/Tercera División RFEF
