= CE Mercadal =

Mercadal
- Full name: Club Esportiu Mercadal
- Founded: 1923
- Ground: San Martì, Es Mercadal, Spain
- Capacity: 1,000
- Chairman: Juan Pablo Pietro
- Manager: Luis Vidal
- League: Tercera Federación – Group 11
- 2025–26: Tercera Federación – Group 11, 8th of 18
Home colours	Away colours

Club Esportiu Mercadal is a football team based in Es Mercadal, Balearic Islands. Founded in 1923, the team plays in Tercera Federación – Group 11, holding home matches at the Estadio San Martì.

== Season to season ==
Season	Tier	Division	Place	Copa del Rey
1923–1944	—	Regional	—	
1944–45	4	1ª Reg.		
1945–46	4	1ª Reg.	3rd	
1946–47	DNP			
1947–48	DNP			
1948–49	DNP			
1949–50	4	1ª Reg.		
1950–51	4	1ª Reg.	4th	
1951–52	4	1ª Reg.		
1952–53	4	1ª Reg.	1st	
1953–54	4	1ª Reg.		
1954–55	3	3ª	6th	
1955–56	3	3ª	(R)	
1956–57	4	1ª Reg.		
1957–58	4	1ª Reg.		
1958–59	4	1ª Reg.		
1959–60	4	1ª Reg.		
1960–61	4	1ª Reg.		
1961–62	4	1ª Reg.		
1962–63	4	1ª Reg.		

Season	Tier	Division	Place	Copa del Rey
1963–64	4	1ª Reg.		
1964–65	4	1ª Reg.		
1965–66	4	1ª Reg.		
1966–67	4	1ª Reg.		
1967–68	4	1ª Reg.		
1968–69	4	1ª Reg.	6th	
1969–70	4	1ª Reg.		
1970–71	DNP			
1971–72	4	1ª Reg.	8th	
1972–73	4	Reg. Pref.	3rd	
1973–74	4	Reg. Pref.		
1974–75	4	Reg. Pref.	6th	
1975–76	4	Reg. Pref.	8th	
1976–77	4	Reg. Pref.	8th	
1977–78	5	Reg. Pref.		
1978–79	5	Reg. Pref.		
1979–80	5	Reg. Pref.		
1980–81	5	Reg. Pref.		
1981–82	5	Reg. Pref.		
1982–83	5	Reg. Pref.		

Season	Tier	Division	Place	Copa del Rey
1983–84	5	Reg. Pref.	6th	
1984–85	5	Reg. Pref.		
1985–86	5	Reg. Pref.		
1986–87	5	Reg. Pref.		
1987–88	5	Reg. Pref.		
1988–89	5	Reg. Pref.		
1989–90	5	Reg. Pref.		
1990–91	5	Reg. Pref.		
1991–92	5	Reg. Pref.		
1992–93	5	Reg. Pref.		
1993–94	5	Reg. Pref.		
1994–95	5	Reg. Pref.		
1995–96	5	Reg. Pref.		
1996–97	5	Reg. Pref.		
1997–98	5	Reg. Pref.		
1998–99	5	Reg. Pref.		
1999–2000	5	Reg. Pref.		
2000–01	5	Reg. Pref.	3rd	
2001–02	5	Reg. Pref.	6th	
2002–03	5	Reg. Pref.	2nd	

Season	Tier	Division	Place	Copa del Rey
2003–04	5	Reg. Pref.	4th	
2004–05	5	Reg. Pref.	7th	
2005–06	5	Reg. Pref.	6th	
2006–07	5	Reg. Pref.	5th	
2007–08	5	Reg. Pref.	1st	
2008–09	4	3ª	16th	
2009–10	4	3ª	8th	
2010–11	4	3ª	9th	
2011–12	4	3ª	10th	
2012–13	4	3ª	12th	
2013–14	4	3ª	5th	
2014–15	4	3ª	4th	
2015–16	4	3ª	7th	
2016–17	4	3ª	16th	
2017–18	4	3ª	16th	
2018–19	4	3ª	20th	
2019–20	5	Reg. Pref.	1st	
2020–21	5	Reg. Pref.	1st	
2021–22	5	3ª RFEF	13th	
2022–23	5	3ª Fed.	9th	

Season	Tier	Division	Place	Copa del Rey
2023–24	5	3ª Fed.	10th	
2024–25	5	3ª Fed.	12th	
2025–26	5	3ª Fed.	8th	
2026–27	5	3ª Fed.		

- 13 seasons in Tercera División
- 6 seasons in Tercera Federación/Tercera División RFEF
