= CD Serverense =

Spanish football club

Serverense
- Full name: Club Deportivo Serverense
- Founded: 1933
- Ground: Ses Eres, Son Servera, Balearic Islands, Spain
- Capacity: 800
- Chairman: (Spain) Jordi Caldentey
- Manager: (Spain) Juan Mayordomo
- League: División de Honor – Mallorca
- 2024–25: División de Honor – Mallorca, 4th of 18
Home colours

Club Deportivo Serverense is a Spanish football team based in Son Servera, in the Balearic Islands. Founded in 1933, it plays in División de Honor – Mallorca, holding home matches at Camp Municipal Ses Eres, with a capacity of 800 people.

== History ==
Founded in 1933, as CD Serverense, the club absorbed Recreativo Serverense (a club dedicated to youth football only) in the 1970s. In 1981, Serverense merged with CF Atlético Badia de Llevant (a club created a year before), and changed its name to CD Badia Cala Millor San Servera.

In their first year CD Badia Cala Millor achieved promotion to Tercera División, and five years later it reached Segunda División B. After changing the club's name to CD Cala Millor in 1988, it suffered administrative relegation and went further down to the regional leagues in 1996.

In 2006 the club changed name back to, CD Serverense. It returned to the fourth tier in 2007 and 2017, suffering relegation in both seasons.

== Season to season ==
=== Old CD Serverense ===
| Season | Tier | Division | Place | Copa del Rey |
|---|---|---|---|---|
| 1944–45 | 5 | 3ª Reg. | 2nd | |
| 1945–46 | 5 | 2ª Reg. | 1st | |
| 1946–47 | 5 | 2ª Reg. | 2nd | |
| 1947–48 | 5 | 2ª Reg. | 7th | |
| 1948–1955 | DNP | | | |
| 1955–56 | 6 | 3ª Reg. | 3rd | |
| 1956–57 | 4 | 1ª Reg. | 5th | |
| 1957–58 | 4 | 1ª Reg. | 4th | |
| 1958–59 | 4 | 1ª Reg. | 11th | |
| 1959–1967 | DNP | | | |
| 1967–68 | 5 | 2ª Reg. | 6th | |
| 1968–69 | 5 | 2ª Reg. | 4th | |

| Season | Tier | Division | Place | Copa del Rey |
|---|---|---|---|---|
| 1969–70 | 5 | 2ª Reg. | 5th | |
| 1970–71 | 4 | 1ª Reg. | 9th | |
| 1971–72 | 4 | 1ª Reg. | 6th | |
| 1972–73 | 4 | Reg. Pref. | 13th | |
| 1973–74 | 4 | Reg. Pref. | 12th | |
| 1974–75 | 4 | Reg. Pref. | 6th | |
| 1975–76 | 4 | Reg. Pref. | 9th | |
| 1976–77 | 4 | Reg. Pref. | 18th | |
| 1977–78 | 6 | 1ª Reg. | 1st | |
| 1978–79 | 5 | Reg. Pref. | 18th | |
| 1979–80 | 5 | Reg. Pref. | 8th | |
| 1980–81 | 5 | Reg. Pref. | 14th | |

=== CF Atlético Badia de Llevant ===
| Season | Tier | Division | Place | Copa del Rey |
|---|---|---|---|---|
| 1980–81 | 8 | 3ª Reg. | 7th | |

=== CD Badia Cala Millor ===
| Season | Tier | Division | Place | Copa del Rey |
|---|---|---|---|---|
| 1981–82 | 5 | Reg. Pref. | 1st | |
| 1982–83 | 4 | 3ª | 5th | |
| 1983–84 | 4 | 3ª | 3rd | First round |
| 1984–85 | 4 | 3ª | 10th | Second round |
| 1985–86 | 4 | 3ª | 3rd | |
| 1986–87 | 4 | 3ª | 3rd | First round |
| 1987–88 | 3 | 2ª B | 16th | Third round |

=== CD Cala Millor ===
| Season | Tier | Division | Place | Copa del Rey |
|---|---|---|---|---|
| 1988–89 | 3 | 2ª B | 15th | Second round |
| 1989–90 | 4 | 3ª | 7th | |
| 1990–91 | 4 | 3ª | 6th | First round |
| 1991–92 | 4 | 3ª | 10th | Third round |
| 1992–93 | 4 | 3ª | 11th | |
| 1993–94 | 4 | 3ª | 4th | |
| 1994–95 | 4 | 3ª | 9th | |
| 1995–96 | 4 | 3ª | 20th | |
| 1996–97 | 5 | Reg. Pref. | 10th | |

| Season | Tier | Division | Place | Copa del Rey |
|---|---|---|---|---|
| 1997–98 | 5 | Reg. Pref. | 20th | |
| 1998–99 | 6 | 1ª Reg. | 11th | |
| 1999–2000 | 6 | 1ª Reg. | 8th | |
| 2000–01 | 6 | 1ª Reg. | 1st | |
| 2001–02 | 5 | Reg. Pref. | 6th | |
| 2002–03 | 5 | Reg. Pref. | 10th | |
| 2003–04 | 5 | Reg. Pref. | 13th | |
| 2004–05 | 5 | Reg. Pref. | 10th | |
| 2005–06 | 5 | Reg. Pref. | 4th | |

=== CD Serverense ===
| Season | Tier | Division | Place | Copa del Rey |
|---|---|---|---|---|
| 2006–07 | 5 | Reg. Pref. | 2nd | |
| 2007–08 | 4 | 3ª | 19th | |
| 2008–09 | 5 | Reg. Pref. | 11th | |
| 2009–10 | 5 | Reg. Pref. | 7th | |
| 2010–11 | 5 | Reg. Pref. | 12th | |
| 2011–12 | 5 | Reg. Pref. | 5th | |
| 2012–13 | 5 | Reg. Pref. | 7th | |
| 2013–14 | 5 | Reg. Pref. | 10th | |
| 2014–15 | 5 | Reg. Pref. | 12th | |
| 2015–16 | 5 | Reg. Pref. | 3rd | |
| 2016–17 | 5 | Reg. Pref. | 6th | |
| 2017–18 | 4 | 3ª | 19th | |
| 2018–19 | 5 | Reg. Pref. | 17th | |
| 2019–20 | 5 | Reg. Pref. | 4th | |
| 2020–21 | 5 | Reg. Pref. | 4th | |
| 2021–22 | 5 | 3ª RFEF | 19th | |
| 2022–23 | 6 | Reg. Pref. | 6th | |
| 2023–24 | 6 | Reg. Pref. | 6th | |
| 2024–25 | 6 | Div. Hon. | 4th | |
| 2025–26 | 6 | Div. Hon. | | |

- 2 seasons in Segunda División B
- 14 seasons in Tercera División
- 1 season in Tercera División RFEF
