= CF Sporting de Mahón =

Spanish association football club

Sporting Mahón
- Full name: Club de Fútbol Sporting de Mahón
- Nickname: Sporting
- Founded: 21 June 2013; 13 years ago
- Ground: Bintaufa, Mahón; Balearic Islands, Spain
- Capacity: 3,000
- President: Luis Sintes
- Head coach: Jordi Pons
- League: División de Honor – Menorca
- 2025–26: División de Honor – Menorca, 5th of 11
- Website: cfsportingdemahon.com
Home colours	Away colours

Club de Fútbol Sporting de Mahón is a Spanish football team based in Mahón, Menorca, in the autonomous community of the Balearic Islands. Founded in 2013 as a phoenix club of CF Sporting Mahonés, they currently play in División de Honor – Menorca, holding home matches at the Camp Municipal de Bintaufa, with a capacity of 3,000 people.

== Season to season ==
Season	Tier	Division	Place	Copa del Rey
2013–14	5	Reg. Pref.	9th	
2014–15	5	Reg. Pref.	4th	
2015–16	5	Reg. Pref.	2nd	
2016–17	5	Reg. Pref.	7th	
2017–18	5	Reg. Pref.	1st	
2018–19	5	Reg. Pref.	2nd	
2019–20	5	Reg. Pref.	6th	
2020–21	5	Reg. Pref.	7th	
2021–22	6	Reg. Pref.	11th	
2022–23	6	Reg. Pref.	8th	
2023–24	6	Reg. Pref.	2nd	
2024–25	6	Div. Hon.	1st	Preliminary
2025–26	6	Div. Hon.		
