= FC Inter Manacor =

Football team

Inter Manacor
- Full name: Futbol Club Inter Manacor
- Founded: 2011
- Ground: Na Capellera, Manacor; Balearic Islands, Spain
- Capacity: 4,000
- President: Trinitario Gomariz
- Manager: Dani Vilchez
- 2025–26: División de Honor – Mallorca, 15th of 18 (relegated)
| Home colours | Away colours |

Futbol Club Inter Manacor is a Spanish football team based in Manacor, Mallorca, Balearic Islands. Founded in 2011, they play in the , holding home matches at the Estadi de Na Capellera.

Inter Manacor is the current farm team of CE Manacor.

== History ==
Founded in 2011 by some childhood friends of Rafael Nadal, the club also had a registration spot in the squad for him in their first season. After two consecutive promotions in their first two seasons, the club first reached the Primera Regional Preferente in 2017.

In May 2022, Inter Manacor achieved a first-ever promotion to Tercera Federación. In August 2024, shortly after suffering relegation, the club reached an agreement with CE Manacor to become their reserve team.

== Season to season ==
Sources:

- As an independent team

| Season | Tier | Division | Place | Copa del Rey |
|---|---|---|---|---|
| 2011–12 | 8 | 3ª Reg. | 1st | |
| 2012–13 | 7 | 2ª Reg. | 2nd | |
| 2013–14 | 6 | 1ª Reg. | 4th | |
| 2014–15 | 6 | 1ª Reg. | 4th | |
| 2015–16 | 6 | 1ª Reg. | 7th | |
| 2016–17 | 6 | 1ª Reg. | 1st | |
| 2017–18 | 5 | Reg. Pref. | 10th | |
| 2018–19 | 5 | Reg. Pref. | 10th | |
| 2019–20 | 5 | Reg. Pref. | 9th | |
| 2020–21 | 5 | Reg. Pref. | 4th | |
| 2021–22 | 6 | Reg. Pref. | 1st | |
| 2022–23 | 5 | 3ª Fed. | 13th | |
| 2023–24 | 5 | 3ª Fed. | 18th | |

- As the reserve team of CE Manacor

| Season | Tier | Division | Place |
|---|---|---|---|
| 2024–25 | 6 | Div. Hon. | 13th |
| 2025–26 | 6 | Div. Hon. | 15th |

- 2 seasons in Tercera Federación
