= CF Sant Rafel =

Spanish football team

Sant Rafel
- Full name: Club de Fútbol Sant Rafel
- Founded: 1968; 58 years ago
- Ground: Municipal, San Rafael, Ibiza, Balearic Islands, Spain
- Capacity: 2,500
- Chairman: Francisco Boned Rosselló
- Manager: Raúl Barroso
- League: División de Honor – Ibiza/Formentera
- 2025–26: División de Honor – Ibiza/Formentera, 2nd of 10
Home colours	Away colours

Club de Fútbol Sant Rafel, known as Sant Rafel or San Rafael, is a Spanish football team based in San Rafael, Ibiza, in the Balearic Islands. Founded in 1968, it plays in División de Honor – Ibiza/Formentera, holding home games at Camp Municipal d'Esports Sant Rafel, with a capacity of 2,500.

On 30 May 2019, the club announced an agreement with UD Ibiza to become their farm team. The affiliation ended in 2022, after Ibiza created their own reserve team.

== Season to season ==
Season	Tier	Division	Place	Copa del Rey
1968–69	4	Reg. Pref.	4th	
1969–70	4	Reg. Pref.	5th	
1970–71	4	Reg. Pref.	2nd	
1971–72	4	Reg. Pref.	4th	
1972–73	4	Reg. Pref.	4th	
1973–74	4	Reg. Pref.	2nd	
1974–75	4	Reg. Pref.	5th	
1975–76	4	Reg. Pref.	7th	
1976–77	4	Reg. Pref.	7th	
1977–78	5	Reg. Pref.		
1978–79	5	Reg. Pref.		
1979–80	5	Reg. Pref.	4th	
1980–81	5	Reg. Pref.	5th	
1981–82	5	Reg. Pref.	6th	
1982–83	5	Reg. Pref.	4th	
1983–84	5	Reg. Pref.	4th	
1984–85	5	Reg. Pref.	2nd	
1985–86	5	Reg. Pref.	1st	
1986–87	5	Reg. Pref.	1st	
1987–88	5	Reg. Pref.	1st	

Season	Tier	Division	Place	Copa del Rey
1988–89	5	Reg. Pref.	1st	
1989–90	5	Reg. Pref.	1st	
1990–91	4	3ª	17th	
1991–92	5	Reg. Pref.	3rd	
1992–93	5	Reg. Pref.	3rd	
1993–94	5	Reg. Pref.	2nd	
1994–95	DNP			
1995–96	5	Reg. Pref.	8th	
1996–97	5	Reg. Pref.	10th	
1997–98	5	Reg. Pref.	2nd	
1998–99	5	Reg. Pref.	1st	
1999–00	5	Reg. Pref.	4th	
2000–01	5	Reg. Pref.	2nd	
2001–02	5	Reg. Pref.	3rd	
2002–03	4	3ª	20th	
2003–04	5	Reg. Pref.	3rd	
2004–05	5	Reg. Pref.	2nd	
2005–06	5	Reg. Pref.	1st	
2006–07	5	Reg. Pref.	3rd	
2007–08	5	Reg. Pref.	2nd	

Season	Tier	Division	Place	Copa del Rey
2008–09	5	Reg. Pref.	1st	
2009–10	4	3ª	9th	
2010–11	4	3ª	8th	
2011–12	4	3ª	5th	
2012–13	4	3ª	7th	
2013–14	4	3ª	16th	
2014–15	4	3ª	10th	
2015–16	4	3ª	11th	
2016–17	4	3ª	6th	
2017–18	4	3ª	13th	
2018–19	4	3ª	9th	
2019–20	4	3ª	9th	N/A (Note: Reserve team of Ibiza.)
2020–21	4	3ª	6th / 6th	N/A
2021–22	5	3ª RFEF	16th	N/A
2022–23	6	Reg. Pref.	6th	
2023–24	6	Reg. Pref.	7th	
2024–25	6	Div. Hon.	2nd	
2025–26	6	Div. Hon.	2nd	
2026–27	6	Div. Hon.		Preliminary

- 14 seasons in Tercera División
- 1 season in Tercera División RFEF
