= UE Alcúdia =

Association football club

Alcúdia
- Full name: Unió Esportiva Alcúdia
- Founded: 1922
- Ground: Els Arcs, Alcúdia, Balearic Islands, Spain
- Capacity: 1,750
- Chairman: Antonio Ruiz Ruiz
- Manager: José Barceló
- League: Tercera Federación – Group 11
- 2025–26: Tercera Federación – Group 11, 13th of 18
Home colours	Away colours

Unió Esportiva Alcúdia (Unión Deportiva Alcúdia in Spanish) is a football team based in Alcúdia in the autonomous community of Balearic Islands. Founded in 1922, it plays in the Tercera Federación – Group 11. Its stadium is Estadi Municipal Els Arcs with a capacity of 1,750.

== Season to season ==
Season	Tier	Division	Place	Copa del Rey
1922–1954	—	Regional	—	
1954–55	5	2ª Reg.		
1955–56	5	2ª Reg.	6th	
1956–57	4	1ª Reg.	6th	
1957–58	4	1ª Reg.	7th	
1958–59	4	1ª Reg.	15th	
1959–60	5	2ª Reg.	(R)	
1960–1964	DNP			
1964–65	5	2ª Reg.		
1965–66	5	2ª Reg.		
1966–67	4	1ª Reg.	14th	
1967–68	4	1ª Reg.	12th	
1968–69	5	2ª Reg.	3rd	
1969–70	5	2ª Reg.	15th	
1970–71	5	2ª Reg.	10th	
1971–72	5	2ª Reg.	4th	
1972–73	6	2ª Reg.	11th	
1973–74	6	2ª Reg.	11th	
1974–75	6	2ª Reg.	7th	
1975–76	6	2ª Reg.	6th	

Season	Tier	Division	Place	Copa del Rey
1976–77	6	2ª Reg.	3rd	
1977–78	6	1ª Reg.	10th	
1978–79	6	1ª Reg.	4th	
1979–80	5	Reg. Pref.	9th	
1980–81	5	Reg. Pref.	17th	
1981–82	6	1ª Reg.	9th	
1982–83	6	1ª Reg.	15th	
1983–84	6	1ª Reg.	2nd	
1984–85	6	1ª Reg.	7th	
1985–86	6	1ª Reg.	1st	
1986–87	5	Reg. Pref.	3rd	
1987–88	4	3ª	15th	
1988–89	4	3ª	17th	
1989–90	5	Reg. Pref.	2nd	
1990–91	4	3ª	19th	
1991–92	5	Reg. Pref.	17th	
1992–93	5	Reg. Pref.	14th	
1993–94	5	Reg. Pref.	9th	
1994–95	5	Reg. Pref.	7th	
1995–96	5	Reg. Pref.	8th	

Season	Tier	Division	Place	Copa del Rey
1996–97	5	Reg. Pref.	15th	
1997–98	5	Reg. Pref.	14th	
1998–99	5	Reg. Pref.	3rd	
1999–2000	5	Reg. Pref.	7th	
2000–01	5	Reg. Pref.	5th	
2001–02	5	Reg. Pref.	2nd	
2002–03	5	Reg. Pref.	6th	
2003–04	4	3ª	18th	
2004–05	5	Reg. Pref.	2nd	
2005–06	5	Reg. Pref.	2nd	
2006–07	4	3ª	11th	
2007–08	4	3ª	8th	
2008–09	4	3ª	9th	
2009–10	4	3ª	7th	
2010–11	4	3ª	14th	
2011–12	4	3ª	14th	
2012–13	4	3ª	4th	
2013–14	4	3ª	7th	
2014–15	4	3ª	15th	
2015–16	4	3ª	6th	

Season	Tier	Division	Place	Copa del Rey
2016–17	4	3ª	3rd	
2017–18	4	3ª	7th	
2018–19	4	3ª	7th	
2019–20	4	3ª	16th	
2020–21	4	3ª	8th / 5th	
2021–22	6	Reg. Pref.	8th	
2022–23	6	Reg. Pref.	1st	
2023–24	5	3ª Fed.	8th	
2024–25	5	3ª Fed.	8th	
2025–26	5	3ª Fed.	13th	
2026–27	5	3ª Fed.		

- 19 seasons in Tercera División
- 4 seasons in Tercera Federación

== Memorable Players ==
UE Alcudia is widely recognized for its strong football academy, which has produced numerous talented players. Many academy graduates have gone on to play for major clubs, including Liverpool, and Barcelona.

== Stadium ==
UD Alcúdia play their home matches at Estadi Municipal Els Arcs, the municipal sports centre between Platja d'Alcúdia and Ciutat Alcúdia. It has a capacity of 5,000, with a basic cantilevered cover on one side of the pitch and a small terrace behind the goal that backs on to the sports centre.
