= PE Sant Jordi =

Association football club in Spain

Sant Jordi
- Full name: Penya Esportiva Sant Jordi
- Founded: 1949
- Ground: Kiko Serra; Sant Jordi de ses Salines, Sant Josep de sa Talaia, Ibiza; Balearic Islands, Spain
- Capacity: 2,000
- President: José Riera Costa
- Manager: David Escandell
- League: Tercera Federación – Group 11
- 2025–26: División de Honor – Ibiza/Formentera, 1st of 10 (champions)
Home colours	Away colours

Penya Esportiva Sant Jordi is a Spanish football club based in Sant Jordi de ses Salines, in the municipality of Sant Josep de sa Talaia, in the island of Ibiza, in the Balearic Islands. Founded in 1949, it plays in Tercera Federación – Group 11, holding home games at Campo Municipal Kiko Serra, with a capacity of 2,000 people.

== History ==
Founded in 1949 under the name of CD San Jorge, the club switched to the current name in 1988, when they established a first team in the Regional Preferente. The club played in that division until 2015, when they ceased activities for one year.

Sant Jordi achieved promotion to Tercera División in 2020. During the season, the club reached the play-offs, but they were knocked out by RCD Mallorca B.

== Season to season ==
Season	Tier	Division	Place	Copa del Rey
1988–89	5	Reg. Pref.	3rd	
1989–90	5	Reg. Pref.	3rd	
1990–91	5	Reg. Pref.	2nd	
1991–92	5	Reg. Pref.	4th	
1992–93	5	Reg. Pref.	6th	
1993–94	5	Reg. Pref.	4th	
1994–95	5	Reg. Pref.	4th	
1995–96	5	Reg. Pref.	9th	
1996–97	5	Reg. Pref.	9th	
1997–98	5	Reg. Pref.	10th	
1998–99	5	Reg. Pref.	5th	
1999–2000	5	Reg. Pref.	2nd	
2000–01	5	Reg. Pref.	1st	
2001–02	5	Reg. Pref.	5th	
2002–03	5	Reg. Pref.	4th	
2003–04	5	Reg. Pref.	2nd	
2004–05	5	Reg. Pref.	1st	
2005–06	5	Reg. Pref.	2nd	
2006–07	5	Reg. Pref.	2nd	
2007–08	5	Reg. Pref.	1st	

Season	Tier	Division	Place	Copa del Rey
2008–09	5	Reg. Pref.	6th	
2009–10	5	Reg. Pref.	4th	
2010–11	5	Reg. Pref.	5th	
2011–12	5	Reg. Pref.	2nd	
2012–13	5	Reg. Pref.	8th	
2013–14	5	Reg. Pref.	7th	
2014–15	5	Reg. Pref.	2nd	
2015–16	DNP			
2016–17	5	Reg. Pref.	6th	
2017–18	5	Reg. Pref.	5th	
2018–19	5	Reg. Pref.	4th	
2019–20	5	Reg. Pref.	1st	
2020–21	4	3ª	2nd / 6th	
2021–22	5	3ª RFEF	8th	
2022–23	5	3ª Fed.	14th	
2023–24	6	Reg. Pref.	1st	
2024–25	5	3ª Fed.	16th	
2025–26	6	Div. Hon.	1st	
2026–27	5	3ª Fed.		

- 1 season in Tercera División
- 4 seasons in Tercera Federación/Tercera División RFEF
