= CE Cardassar =

Cardassar
- Full name: Club Esportiu Cardassar
- Founded: 1924
- Ground: Es Moleter, Sant Llorenç des Cardassar, Balearic Islands, Spain
- Capacity: 1,000
- President: Jaume Soler
- Head coach: Miquel Àngel Tomàs
- League: Tercera Federación – Group 11
- 2025–26: Tercera Federación – Group 11, 9th of 18
- Website: https://www.cecardassar.com/
Home colours	Away colours

Club Esportiu Cardassar is a Spanish football team based in the town of Sant Llorenç des Cardassar, in the autonomous community of the Balearic Islands. Founded in 1924, it plays in Tercera Federación – Group 11, holding home matches at Es Moleter, with a capacity of 1,000 seats.

== Season to season ==
Season	Tier	Division	Place	Copa del Rey
1940–1955	—	Regional	—	
1955–56	5	2ª Reg.	5th	
1956–57	4	1ª Reg.	2nd	
1957–58	4	1ª Reg.	1st	
1958–59	3	3ª	15th	
1959–60	3	3ª	10th	
1960–61	3	3ª	14th	
1961–62	4	1ª Reg.		
1962–63	4	1ª Reg.		
1963–64	5	2ª Reg.	3rd	
1964–65	5	2ª Reg.		
1965–66	5	2ª Reg.		
1966–67	5	2ª Reg.		
1967–68	5	2ª Reg.		
1968–69	5	2ª Reg.	7th	
1969–70	5	2ª Reg.	10th	
1970–71	DNP			
1971–72	5	2ª Reg.	15th	
1972–73	7	3ª Reg.	5th	
1973–74	7	3ª Reg.	10th	

Season	Tier	Division	Place	Copa del Rey
1974–1979	DNP			
1979–80	7	2ª Reg.	6th	
1980–81	7	2ª Reg.	2nd	
1981–82	6	1ª Reg.	2nd	
1982–83	5	Reg. Pref.	9th	
1983–84	5	Reg. Pref.	14th	
1984–85	5	Reg. Pref.	8th	
1985–86	5	Reg. Pref.	14th	
1986–87	5	Reg. Pref.	11th	
1987–88	5	Reg. Pref.	3rd	
1988–89	5	Reg. Pref.	5th	
1989–90	4	3ª	12th	
1990–91	4	3ª	15th	
1991–92	4	3ª	9th	
1992–93	4	3ª	13th	
1993–94	4	3ª	11th	
1994–95	4	3ª	12th	
1995–96	4	3ª	13th	
1996–97	4	3ª	16th	
1997–98	4	3ª	18th	

Season	Tier	Division	Place	Copa del Rey
1998–99	5	Reg. Pref.	4th	
1999–2000	4	3ª	6th	
2000–01	4	3ª	8th	
2001–02	4	3ª	9th	
2002–03	4	3ª	17th	
2003–04	4	3ª	19th	
2004–05	5	Reg. Pref.	7th	
2005–06	5	Reg. Pref.	8th	
2006–07	5	Reg. Pref.	11th	
2007–08	5	Reg. Pref.	18th	
2008–09	5	Reg. Pref.	15th	
2009–10	5	Reg. Pref.	9th	
2010–11	5	Reg. Pref.	10th	
2011–12	5	Reg. Pref.	7th	
2012–13	5	Reg. Pref.	10th	
2013–14	5	Reg. Pref.	4th	
2014–15	5	Reg. Pref.	3rd	
2015–16	5	Reg. Pref.	8th	
2016–17	5	Reg. Pref.	12th	
2017–18	5	Reg. Pref.	20th	

Season	Tier	Division	Place	Copa del Rey
2018–19	6	1ª Reg.	3rd	
2019–20	5	Reg. Pref.	1st	
2020–21	4	3ª	8th / 6th	First round
2021–22	6	Reg. Pref.	4th	
2022–23	6	Reg. Pref.	2nd	Preliminary
2023–24	6	Reg. Pref.	1st	
2024–25	6	Div. Hon.	6th	
2025–26	5	3ª Fed.	9th	
2026–27	5	3ª Fed.		

- 18 seasons in Tercera División
- 2 seasons in Tercera Federación
