= CE Campos =

Campos
- Full name: Club Esportiu Campos
- Founded: 1968
- Ground: Estadio Municipal, Campos, Spain
- Capacity: 1,500
- Chairman: (Spain) Tomeu Prohens
- Manager: (Spain) Gaspar Sastre
- League: División de Honor – Mallorca
- 2024–25: Tercera Federación – Group 11, 17th of 18 (relegated)
Home colours	Away colours

Club Esportiu Campos is a football team based in Campos, Illes Balears. Founded in 1968, the team plays in División de Honor – Mallorca. The club's home ground is Estadio Municipal.

== Season to season ==
Season	Tier	Division	Place	Copa del Rey
1968–69	5	2ª Reg.	6th	
1969–70	5	2ª Reg.	2nd	
1970–71	4	1ª Reg.	7th	
1971–72	4	1ª Reg.	3rd	
1972–73	4	Reg. Pref.	4th	
1973–74	4	Reg. Pref.	5th	
1974–75	4	Reg. Pref.	4th	
1975–76	4	Reg. Pref.	14th	
1976–77	4	Reg. Pref.	14th	
1977–78	5	Reg. Pref.	15th	
1978–79	5	Reg. Pref.	12th	
1979–80	5	Reg. Pref.	16th	
1980–81	5	Reg. Pref.	9th	
1981–82	5	Reg. Pref.	4th	
1982–83	5	Reg. Pref.	13th	
1983–84	5	Reg. Pref.	12th	
1984–85	5	Reg. Pref.	9th	
1985–86	5	Reg. Pref.	10th	
1986–87	5	Reg. Pref.	7th	
1987–88	5	Reg. Pref.	12th	

Season	Tier	Division	Place	Copa del Rey
1988–89	5	Reg. Pref.	16th	
1989–90	5	1ª Reg.	5th	
1990–91	5	1ª Reg.	1st	
1991–92	5	Reg. Pref.	11th	
1992–93	5	Reg. Pref.	14th	
1993–94	5	Reg. Pref.	1st	
1994–95	4	3ª	14th	
1995–96	4	3ª	7th	
1996–97	4	3ª	9th	
1997–98	4	3ª	6th	
1998–99	4	3ª	9th	
1999–2000	4	3ª	12th	
2000–01	5	Reg. Pref.	12th	
2001–02	5	Reg. Pref.	7th	
2002–03	5	Reg. Pref.	2nd	
2003–04	5	Reg. Pref.	1st	
2004–05	4	3ª	18th	
2005–06	5	Reg. Pref.	7th	
2006–07	5	Reg. Pref.	4th	
2007–08	5	Reg. Pref.	1st	

Season	Tier	Division	Place	Copa del Rey
2008–09	4	3ª	11th	
2009–10	4	3ª	16th	
2010–11	4	3ª	13th	
2011–12	4	3ª	8th	
2012–13	4	3ª	5th	
2013–14	4	3ª	13th	
2014–15	4	3ª	12th	
2015–16	4	3ª	13th	
2016–17	4	3ª	20th	
2017–18	5	Reg. Pref.	17th	
2018–19	5	Reg. Pref.	4th	
2019–20	5	Reg. Pref.	2nd	
2020–21	5	Reg. Pref.	1st	
2021–22	5	3ª RFEF	17th	
2022–23	6	Reg. Pref.	10th	
2023–24	6	Reg. Pref.	3rd	
2024–25	5	3ª Fed.	17th	
2025–26	6	Div. Hon.		

- 16 seasons in Tercera División
- 2 seasons in Tercera Federación/Tercera División RFEF
