= UE Alaró =

Spanish association football club

Alaró
- Full name: Unió Esportiva Alaró
- Founded: 1940
- Ground: Municipal, Alaró; Balearic Islands, Spain
- Capacity: 1,000
- President: Llorenç Guardiola
- Head coach: Miquel Simonet
- League: División de Honor – Mallorca
- 2025–26: División de Honor – Mallorca, 12th of 18
Home colours

Unió Esportiva Alaró (Unión Deportiva Alaró in Spanish) is a Spanish football team based in Alaró, Majorca, in the autonomous community of the Balearic Islands. Founded in 1940, they currently play in División de Honor – Mallorca, holding home matches at the Estadio Municipal d'Alaró, with a capacity of 1,000 people.

== Club's background ==
- Club Deportivo Alaró – (1940–62)
- Club Deportivo Atlético Alaró – (1963–66)
- Club Deportivo Alaró – (1967–70)
- Unión Deportiva Alaró/Unió Esportiva Alaró – (1970–)

== Season to season ==
Season	Tier	Division	Place	Copa del Rey
1940–1955	—	Regional		
1955–56	5	2ª Reg.	2nd	
1956–57	3	3ª	12th	
1957–58	3	3ª	11th	
1958–59	3	3ª	8th	
1959–60	3	3ª	8th	
1960–61	3	3ª	11th	
1961–62	3	3ª	7th	
1962–63	DNP			
1963–64	5	2ª Reg.	7th	
1964–65	5	2ª Reg.		
1965–66	4	1ª Reg.	(R)	
1966–67	DNP			
1967–68	4	1ª Reg.	7th	
1968–69	4	1ª Reg.	12th	
1969–70	4	1ª Reg.	15th	
1970–71	4	1ª Reg.	13th	
1971–72	4	1ª Reg.	10th	
1972–73	5	1ª Reg.	10th	
1973–74	5	1ª Reg.	6th	

Season	Tier	Division	Place	Copa del Rey
1974–75	5	1ª Reg.	9th	
1975–76	5	1ª Reg.	15th	
1976–77	6	2ª Reg.	4th	
1977–78	6	1ª Reg.	4th	
1978–79	6	1ª Reg.	6th	
1979–80	5	Reg. Pref.	7th	
1980–81	5	Reg. Pref.	3rd	
1981–82	5	Reg. Pref.	9th	
1982–83	5	Reg. Pref.	5th	
1983–84	5	Reg. Pref.	1st	
1984–85	4	3ª	14th	
1985–86	4	3ª	15th	
1986–87	4	3ª	9th	
1987–88	4	3ª	12th	
1988–89	4	3ª	18th	
1989–90	5	Reg. Pref.	5th	
1990–91	4	3ª	18th	
1991–92	5	Reg. Pref.	18th	
1992–93	5	Reg. Pref.	17th	
1993–94	5	Reg. Pref.	17th	

Season	Tier	Division	Place	Copa del Rey
1994–95	5	Reg. Pref.	1st	
1995–96	4	3ª	17th	
1996–97	4	3ª	20th	
1997–98	5	Reg. Pref.	5th	
1998–99	5	Reg. Pref.	19th	
1999–2000	6	1ª Reg.	16th	
2000–01	6	1ª Reg.	14th	
2001–02	6	1ª Reg.	16th	
2002–03	7	2ª Reg.	11th	
2003–04	7	2ª Reg.	2nd	
2004–05	6	1ª Reg.	9th	
2005–06	6	1ª Reg.	6th	
2006–07	6	1ª Reg.	8th	
2007–08	6	1ª Reg.	7th	
2008–09	6	1ª Reg.	2nd	
2009–10	5	Reg. Pref.	16th	
2010–11	5	Reg. Pref.	13th	
2011–12	5	Reg. Pref.	15th	
2012–13	5	Reg. Pref.	9th	
2013–14	5	Reg. Pref.	3rd	

Season	Tier	Division	Place	Copa del Rey
2014–15	4	3ª	14th	
2015–16	4	3ª	20th	
2016–17	5	Reg. Pref.	15th	
2017–18	5	Reg. Pref.	15th	
2018–19	5	Reg. Pref.	8th	
2019–20	5	Reg. Pref.	6th	
2020–21	5	Reg. Pref.	5th	
2021–22	6	Reg. Pref.	12th	
2022–23	6	Reg. Pref.	5th	
2023–24	6	Reg. Pref.	4th	
2024–25	6	Div. Hon.	14th	
2025–26	6	Div. Hon.		

- 16 seasons in Tercera División
