= SD Portmany =

Association football club in Spain

Portmany
- Full name: Sociedad Deportiva Portmany
- Founded: September 1923; 103 years ago
- Ground: Sant Antoni; Sant Antoni de Portmany, Ibiza; Balearic Islands, Spain
- Capacity: 890
- President: Nacho Andrés Roselló
- Manager: Carlos Luque
- League: División de Honor – Ibiza/Formentera
- 2025–26: Tercera Federación – Group 11, 15th of 18 (relegated)
Home colours	Away colours

Sociedad Deportiva Portmany is a Spanish football club based in Sant Antoni de Portmany, in the island of Ibiza, in the Balearic Islands. Founded in 1923, it plays in División de Honor – Ibiza/Formentera, holding home games at Campo Municipal de Futbol Sant Antoni, with a capacity of 890 spectators.

== Season to season ==
Season	Tier	Division	Place	Copa del Rey
1948–49	4	1ª Reg.		
1949–50	4	1ª Reg.	2nd	
1950–51	4	1ª Reg.	2nd	
1951–52	4	1ª Reg.	4th	
1952–53	4	1ª Reg.	1st	
1953–54	4	1ª Reg.	3rd	
1954–55	4	1ª Reg.	3rd	
1955–56	DNP			
1956–57	4	1ª Reg.	3rd	
1957–58	DNP			
1958–59	4	1ª Reg.	1st	
1959–60	DNP			
1960–61	4	1ª Reg.		
1961–62	4	1ª Reg.	4th	
1962–63	4	1ª Reg.		
1963–64	4	1ª Reg.		
1964–65	4	1ª Reg.	1st	
1965–66	4	1ª Reg.		
1966–67	4	1ª Reg.		
1967–68	4	1ª Reg.	2nd	

Season	Tier	Division	Place	Copa del Rey
1968–69	4	1ª Reg.	2nd	
1969–70	4	1ª Reg.	1st	
1970–71	4	1ª Reg.	1st	
1971–72	4	1ª Reg.	1st	
1972–73	4	Reg. Pref.	1st	
1973–74	4	Reg. Pref.	1st	
1974–75	4	Reg. Pref.	2nd	
1975–76	4	Reg. Pref.	1st	
1976–77	4	Reg. Pref.	1st	
1977–78	4	3ª	18th	
1978–79	5	Reg. Pref.		
1979–80	4	3ª	7th	
1980–81	4	3ª	8th	
1981–82	4	3ª	7th	
1982–83	4	3ª	3rd	
1983–84	4	3ª	8th	
1984–85	4	3ª	4th	
1985–86	4	3ª	10th	
1986–87	4	3ª	6th	
1987–88	4	3ª	14th	

Season	Tier	Division	Place	Copa del Rey
1988–89	4	3ª	10th	
1989–90	4	3ª	12th	
1990–91	4	3ª	5th	
1991–92	4	3ª	5th	
1992–93	4	3ª	17th	
1993–94	5	Reg. Pref.	1st	
1994–95	5	Reg. Pref.	1st	
1995–96	4	3ª	12th	
1996–97	4	3ª	14th	
1997–98	4	3ª	20th	
1998–99	5	Reg. Pref.	3rd	
1999–2000	5	Reg. Pref.	1st	
2000–01	5	Reg. Pref.	3rd	
2001–02	5	Reg. Pref.	1st	
2002–03	5	Reg. Pref.	2nd	
2003–04	5	Reg. Pref.	1st	
2004–05	4	3ª	20th	
2005–06	5	Reg. Pref.	4th	
2006–07	5	Reg. Pref.	1st	
2007–08	5	Reg. Pref.	5th	

Season	Tier	Division	Place	Copa del Rey
2008–09	5	Reg. Pref.	3rd	
2009–10	5	Reg. Pref.	1st	
2010–11	5	Reg. Pref.	1st	
2011–12	5	Reg. Pref.	3rd	
2012–13	5	Reg. Pref.	2nd	
2013–14	5	Reg. Pref.	1st	
2014–15	5	Reg. Pref.	4th	
2015–16	5	Reg. Pref.	3rd	
2016–17	5	Reg. Pref.	3rd	
2017–18	5	Reg. Pref.	2nd	
2018–19	5	Reg. Pref.	1st	
2019–20	4	3ª	17th	
2020–21	4	3ª	5th	
2021–22	5	3ª RFEF	9th	
2022–23	5	3ª Fed.	10th	
2023–24	5	3ª Fed.	12th	
2024–25	5	3ª Fed.	15th	
2025–26	5	3ª Fed.		

- 21 seasons in Tercera División
- 5 seasons in Tercera Federación/Tercera División RFEF
