= CD Llosetense =

Spanish football team

Llosetense
- Full name: Club Deportivo Llosetense
- Founded: 2 September 1944; 82 years ago
- Ground: Municipal, Lloseta, Balearic Islands, Spain
- Capacity: 2,000
- President: Pedro Ignaci Prieto
- Head coach: Nicolás López Vidal
- League: Tercera Federación – Group 11
- 2025–26: Tercera Federación – Group 11, 5th of 18
Home colours	Away colours

Club Deportivo Llosetense is a Spanish football team based in Lloseta, Majorca, in the autonomous community of Balearic Islands. Founded in 1944, it plays in Tercera Federación – Group 11, holding home matches at Estadio Municipal de Lloseta.

== History ==
The club was founded on 2 September 1944, with Campo de Son Batle as its first stadium.

== Season to season ==
Season	Tier	Division	Place	Copa del Rey
1944–45	5	3ª Reg.	3rd	
1945–46	5	3ª Reg.	2nd	
1946–47	5	3ª Reg.	2nd	
1947–48	5	3ª Reg.	6th	
1948–49	5	3ª Reg.	2nd	
1949–50	4	1ª Reg.	7th	
1950–51	4	1ª Reg.	2nd	
1951–52	4	1ª Reg.	1st	
1952–53	4	1ª Reg.	10th	
1953–54	4	1ª Reg.	8th	
1954–55	4	1ª Reg.	4th	
1955–56	4	1ª Reg.	10th	
1956–57	4	1ª Reg.	3rd	
1957–58	4	1ª Reg.	11th	
1958–59	4	1ª Reg.	6th	
1959–60	4	1ª Reg.	11th	
1960–1964	DNP			
1964–65	4	1ª Reg.	1st	
1965–66	4	1ª Reg.	5th	
1966–67	4	1ª Reg.	3rd	

Season	Tier	Division	Place	Copa del Rey
1967–68	4	1ª Reg.	6th	
1968–69	4	1ª Reg.	4th	
1969–70	4	1ª Reg.	9th	
1970–71	4	1ª Reg.	6th	
1971–72	4	1ª Reg.	6th	
1972–73	4	Reg. Pref.	8th	
1973–74	4	Reg. Pref.	15th	
1974–75	4	Reg. Pref.	12th	
1975–76	4	Reg. Pref.	10th	
1976–77	4	Reg. Pref.	16th	
1977–78	5	Reg. Pref.	10th	
1978–79	5	Reg. Pref.	14th	
1979–80	5	Reg. Pref.	14th	
1980–81	5	Reg. Pref.	13th	
1981–82	5	Reg. Pref.	6th	
1982–83	5	Reg. Pref.	16th	
1983–84	5	Reg. Pref.	9th	
1984–85	5	Reg. Pref.	13th	
1985–86	5	Reg. Pref.	2nd	
1986–87	5	Reg. Pref.	1st	

Season	Tier	Division	Place	Copa del Rey
1987–88	4	3ª	16th	
1988–89	4	3ª	9th	
1989–90	4	3ª	20th	
1990–91	5	Reg. Pref.	4th	
1991–92	4	3ª	14th	
1992–93	4	3ª	19th	
1993–94	5	Reg. Pref.	13th	
1994–95	5	Reg. Pref.	18th	
1995–96	6	1ª Reg.	10th	
1996–97	6	1ª Reg.	4th	
1997–98	6	1ª Reg.	9th	
1998–99	6	1ª Reg.	3rd	
1999–2000	5	Reg. Pref.	20th	
2000–01	6	1ª Reg.	8th	
2001–02	6	1ª Reg.	15th	
2002–03	6	1ª Reg.	8th	
2003–04	6	1ª Reg.	10th	
2004–05	6	1ª Reg.	5th	
2005–06	6	1ª Reg.	15th	
2006–07	7	2ª Reg.	1st	

Season	Tier	Division	Place	Copa del Rey
2007–08	6	1ª Reg.	1st	
2008–09	5	Reg. Pref.	2nd	
2009–10	4	3ª	14th	
2010–11	4	3ª	5th	
2011–12	4	3ª	3rd	
2012–13	4	3ª	8th	
2013–14	4	3ª	9th	
2014–15	4	3ª	2nd	
2015–16	3	2ª B	19th	
2016–17	4	3ª	5th	
2017–18	4	3ª	15th	
2018–19	4	3ª	12th	
2019–20	4	3ª	14th	
2020–21	4	3ª	7th / 4th	
2021–22	5	3ª RFEF	5th	
2022–23	5	3ª Fed.	7th	
2023–24	5	3ª Fed.	9th	
2024–25	5	3ª Fed.	10th	
2025–26	5	3ª Fed.	5th	
2026–27	5	3ª Fed.		

- 1 season in Segunda División B
- 16 seasons in Tercera División
- 6 seasons in Tercera Federación/Tercera División RFEF
