= CE Esporles =

Spanish association football club

Esporles
- Full name: Club Esportiu Esporles
- Founded: 3 August 1957; 69 years ago
- Ground: Son Quint, Esporles; Balearic Islands, Spain
- Capacity: 1,000
- President: Jaume Vives Ferragut
- Manager: Jorge Avelar
- League: División de Honor – Mallorca
- 2025–26: División de Honor – Mallorca, 9th of 18
Home colours	Away colours

Club Esportiu Esporles is a Spanish football team based in Esporles, Majorca, in the autonomous community of the Balearic Islands. Founded in 1957, they currently play in División de Honor – Mallorca, holding home matches at the Camp Municipal de Son Quint, with a capacity of 1,000 people.

== History ==
Founded on 3 August 1957 under the presidency of Rafael Nadal Salas and named Club Deportivo Esporlas, the club ceased activities in 1960 after missing out promotion to Tercera División. Back in 1975 under the name of Cooperativa Cultural Deportiva Esporlas, the club was renamed Cooperativa Cultural Esporlas in 1978, and then to Club Deportivo Esporlas one year later.

Esporlas achieved a first-ever promotion to the fourth tier in 1992, being relegated back two seasons later. In 1996, one year after a promotion back to division four, the club switched name to Club Esportiu Esporles.

In May 2009, Esporles achieved a second consecutive promotion after winning the Primera Regional Preferente title, returning to the fourth division after 12 years.

== Season to season ==
Season	Tier	Division	Place	Copa del Rey
1957–58	5	2ª Reg.	6th	
1958–59	5	2ª Reg.		
1959–60	4	1ª Reg.	3rd	
1960–1975	DNP			
1975–76	7	3ª Reg.	9th	
1976–77	7	3ª Reg.	6th	
1977–78	8	3ª Reg.	1st	
1978–79	7	2ª Reg.	4th	
1979–80	6	1ª Reg.	7th	
1980–81	6	1ª Reg.	4th	
1981–82	6	1ª Reg.	1st	
1982–83	5	Reg. Pref.	6th	
1983–84	5	Reg. Pref.	7th	
1984–85	5	Reg. Pref.	6th	
1985–86	5	Reg. Pref.	5th	
1986–87	5	Reg. Pref.	13th	
1987–88	5	Reg. Pref.	8th	
1988–89	5	Reg. Pref.	8th	
1989–90	5	Reg. Pref.	3rd	
1990–91	5	Reg. Pref.	3rd	

Season	Tier	Division	Place	Copa del Rey
1991–92	5	Reg. Pref.	1st	
1992–93	4	3ª	16th	
1993–94	4	3ª	18th	
1994–95	5	Reg. Pref.	6th	
1995–96	4	3ª	15th	
1996–97	4	3ª	18th	
1997–98	5	Reg. Pref.	17th	
1998–99	5	Reg. Pref.	21st	
1999–2000	6	1ª Reg.	3rd	
2000–01	5	Reg. Pref.	7th	
2001–02	5	Reg. Pref.	3rd	
2002–03	5	Reg. Pref.	5th	
2003–04	5	Reg. Pref.	12th	
2004–05	5	Reg. Pref.	16th	
2005–06	5	Reg. Pref.	15th	
2006–07	5	Reg. Pref.	19th	
2007–08	6	1ª Reg.	2nd	
2008–09	5	Reg. Pref.	1st	
2009–10	4	3ª	19th	
2010–11	5	Reg. Pref.	11th	

Season	Tier	Division	Place	Copa del Rey
2011–12	5	Reg. Pref.	16th	
2012–13	5	Reg. Pref.	16th	
2013–14	5	Reg. Pref.	7th	
2014–15	5	Reg. Pref.	4th	
2015–16	4	3ª	15th	
2016–17	4	3ª	15th	
2017–18	4	3ª	11th	
2018–19	4	3ª	18th	
2019–20	4	3ª	20th	
2020–21	4	3ª	11th / 10th	
2021–22	6	Reg. Pref.	20th	
2022–23	6	Reg. Pref.	14th	
2023–24	6	Reg. Pref.	5th	
2024–25	6	Div. Hon.	10th	
2025–26	6	Div. Hon.	9th	
2026–27	6	Div. Hon.		

- 11 seasons in Tercera División
