= Club Santa Catalina Atlético =

Football club based in Palma, Majorca

Santa Catalina
- Full name: Club Santa Catalina Atlético
- Founded: 1986; 40 years ago
- Ground: Son Flo, Sant Francesc Xavier, Palma, Majorca, Spain
- Capacity: 1,000
- Chairman: Lluc Colom Deyá
- Manager: Miguel Manzi
- League: División de Honor – Mallorca
- 2024–25: División de Honor – Mallorca, 8th of 18
Home colours	Away colours

Club Santa Catalina Atlético is a football team based in Palma, Majorca in the autonomous community of Balearic Islands. It plays in División de Honor – Mallorca, holding home matches at the Camp Municipal de Son Flo, which has a capacity of 1,000 spectators.

== Season to season ==
Season	Tier	Division	Place	Copa del Rey
2006–07	8	3ª Reg.	9th	
2007–08	8	3ª Reg.	9th	
2008–09	6	1ª Reg.	17th	
2009–10	6	1ª Reg.	14th	
2010–11	6	1ª Reg.	2nd	
2011–12	5	Reg. Pref.	13th	
2012–13	5	Reg. Pref.	4th	
2013–14	5	Reg. Pref.	2nd	
2014–15	5	Reg. Pref.	1st	
2015–16	4	3ª	17th	
2016–17	4	3ª	10th	
2017–18	4	3ª	9th	
2018–19	4	3ª	8th	
2019–20	4	3ª	18th	
2020–21	4	3ª	9th / 7th	
2021–22	6	Reg. Pref.	11th	
2022–23	6	Reg. Pref.	10th	
2023–24	6	Reg. Pref.	9th	
2024–25	6	Div. Hon.	8th	
2025–26	6	Div. Hon.		

- 6 seasons in Tercera División
