= UD Mahón =

Spanish association football club

Mahón
- Full name: Unión Deportiva Mahón
- Nickname: La Unió (The Union)
- Founded: 17 November 1922; 103 years ago
- Ground: Campo de San Carlo, Mahón; Balearic Islands, Spain
- Capacity: 4,520
- President: Bernardino Gelabert Petrus
- Head coach: Juan Romero
- League: División de Honor – Menorca
- 2024–25: División de Honor – Menorca, 4th of 10
- Website: https://www.uniondeportivamahon.com/
Home colours	Away colours

Unión Deportiva Mahón is a Spanish football team based in Mahón, Menorca, in the autonomous community of the Balearic Islands. Founded in 1922, they currently play in División de Honor – Menorca, holding home matches at the Campo de San Carlo, with a capacity of 4,520 people.

The club merged with CD Menorca in 1974 to create CF Sporting Mahonés, but returned to an independent status in 2001.

== History ==
=== Club background ===
- Unió Sportiva Mahón – (1922–1940)
- Unión Deportiva Mahón – (1940–present)

== Season to season ==
Season	Tier	Division	Place	Copa del Rey
1944–45	4	1ª Reg.	2nd	
1945–46	4	1ª Reg.	2nd	
1946–47	4	1ª Reg.	7th	
1947–48	4	1ª Reg.	5th	
1948–49	4	1ª Reg.		
1949–50	4	1ª Reg.		
1950–51	4	1ª Reg.	1st	
1951–52	3	3ª	11th	
1952–53	3	3ª	12th	
1953–54	3	3ª	6th	
1954–55	3	3ª	1st	
1955–56	3	3ª	1st	
1956–57	3	3ª	6th	
1957–58	3	3ª	9th	
1958–59	3	3ª	6th	
1959–60	3	3ª	5th	
1960–61	3	3ª	4th	
1961–62	3	3ª	3rd	
1962–63	3	3ª	1st	
1963–64	3	3ª	3rd	

Season	Tier	Division	Place	Copa del Rey
1964–65	3	3ª	5th	
1965–66	3	3ª	1st	
1966–67	3	3ª	1st	
1967–68	3	3ª	2nd	
1968–69	3	3ª	10th	
1969–70	3	3ª	11th	
1970–71	4	1ª Reg.		
1971–72	4	1ª Reg.	2nd	
1972–73	4	1ª Reg.		
1973–74	3	3ª	19th	
1974–2001	DNP			
2001–02	5	Reg. Pref.	8th	
2002–03	5	Reg. Pref.	12th	
2003–04	5	Reg. Pref.	9th	
2004–05	5	Reg. Pref.	8th	
2005–06	5	Reg. Pref.	3rd	
2006–07	5	Reg. Pref.	6th	
2007–08	5	Reg. Pref.	4th	
2008–09	5	Reg. Pref.	4th	
2009–10	5	Reg. Pref.	3rd	

Season	Tier	Division	Place	Copa del Rey
2010–11	5	Reg. Pref.	2nd	
2011–12	5	Reg. Pref.	6th	
2012–13	5	Reg. Pref.	7th	
2013–14	5	Reg. Pref.	7th	
2014–15	5	Reg. Pref.	5th	
2015–16	5	Reg. Pref.	3rd	
2016–17	5	Reg. Pref.	1st	
2017–18	5	Reg. Pref.	2nd	
2018–19	5	Reg. Pref.	1st	
2019–20	5	Reg. Pref.	4th	
2020–21	5	Reg. Pref.	2nd	
2021–22	6	Reg. Pref.	3rd	
2022–23	6	Reg. Pref.	5th	
2023–24	6	Reg. Pref.	5th	
2024–25	6	Div. Hon.	4th	
2025–26	6	Div. Hon.		

- 20 seasons in Tercera División
