= Inter Ibiza CD =

Association football club in Spain

Inter Ibiza
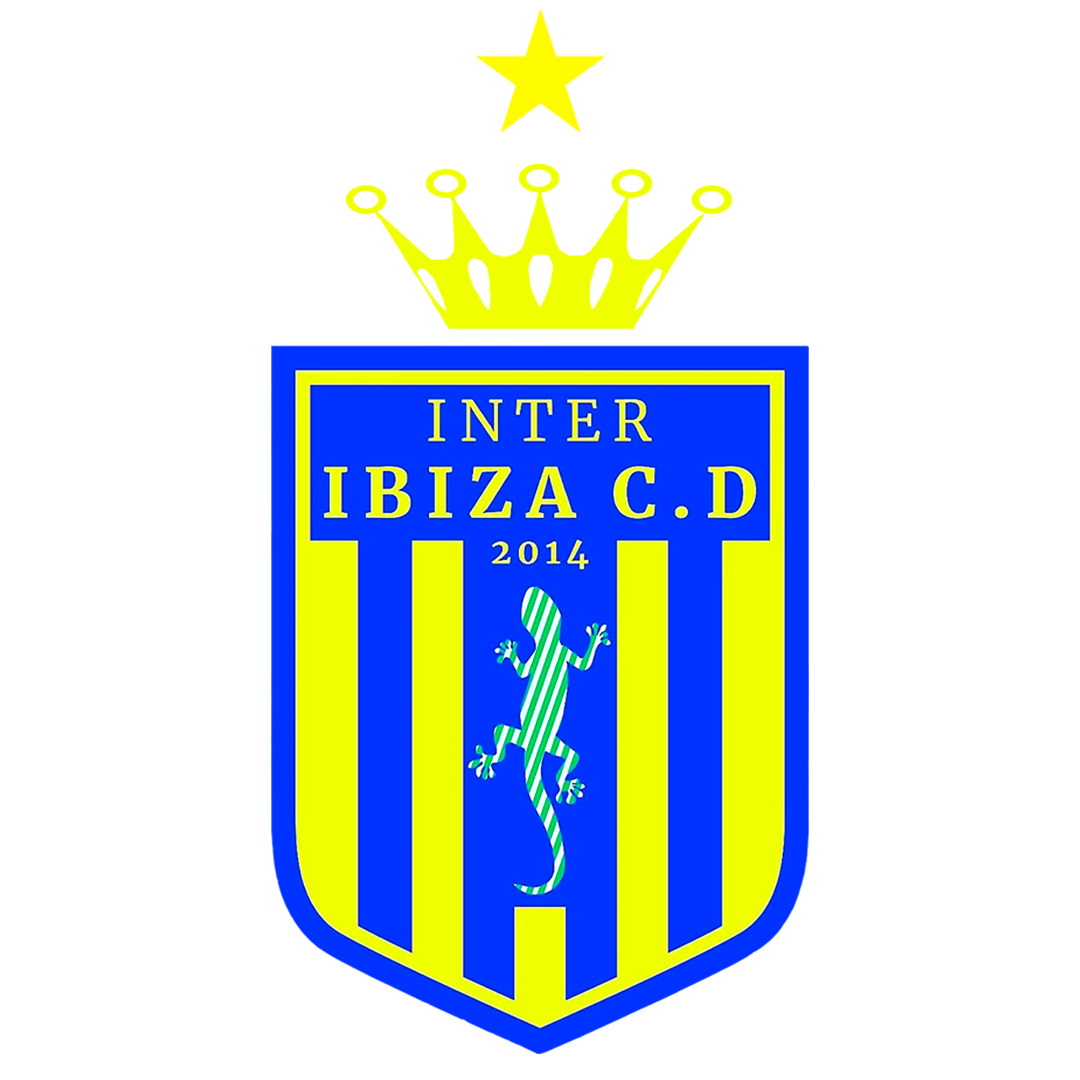
- Full name: Inter Ibiza Club Deportivo
- Founded: 2014
- Ground: Can Cantó, Ibiza, Balearic Islands, Spain
- Capacity: 1,000
- President: Carlos Fourcade
- Manager: Carlos Fourcade
- League: Tercera Federación – Group 11
- 2025–26: Tercera Federación – Group 11, 7th of 18
Home colours	Away colours

Inter Ibiza Club Deportivo is a Spanish football club based in Ibiza, in the island of the same name, in the Balearic Islands. Founded in 2014, they play in Tercera Federación – Group 11, holding home games at Estadio Can Cantó, with a capacity of 1,000 people.

== History ==
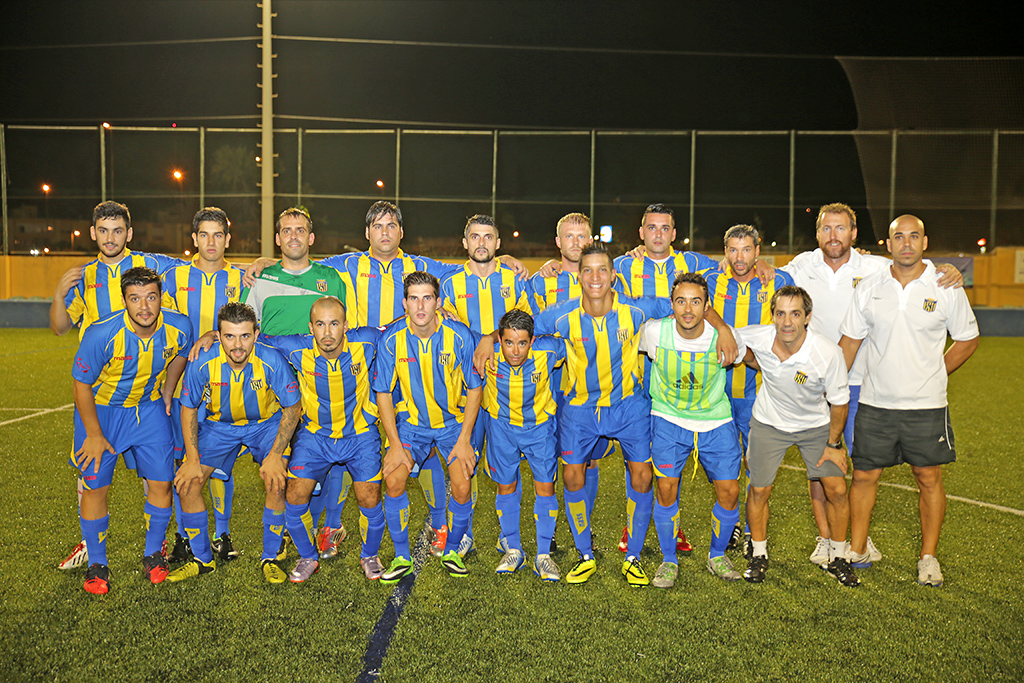
Inter Ibiza's lineup in 2014

Founded in 2014, Inter Ibiza achieved a first-ever promotion to Tercera División RFEF in June 2021. After suffering immediate relegation, the club returned to the fifth tier in May 2025.

== Season to season ==
Season	Tier	Division	Place	Copa del Rey
2014–15	5	Reg. Pref.	11th	
2015–16	5	Reg. Pref.	7th	
2016–17	5	Reg. Pref.	5th	
2017–18	5	Reg. Pref.	4th	
2018–19	5	Reg. Pref.	3rd	
2019–20	5	Reg. Pref.	2nd	
2020–21	5	Reg. Pref.	1st	
2021–22	5	3ª RFEF	14th	
2022–23	6	Reg. Pref.	1st	
2023–24	6	Reg. Pref.	2nd	
2024–25	6	Div. Hon.	1st	
2025–26	5	3ª Fed.	7th	
2026–27	5	3ª Fed.		

- 3 seasons in Tercera Federación/Tercera División RFEF
