= Iñaki Caña =

Spanish football player and coach (born 1975)

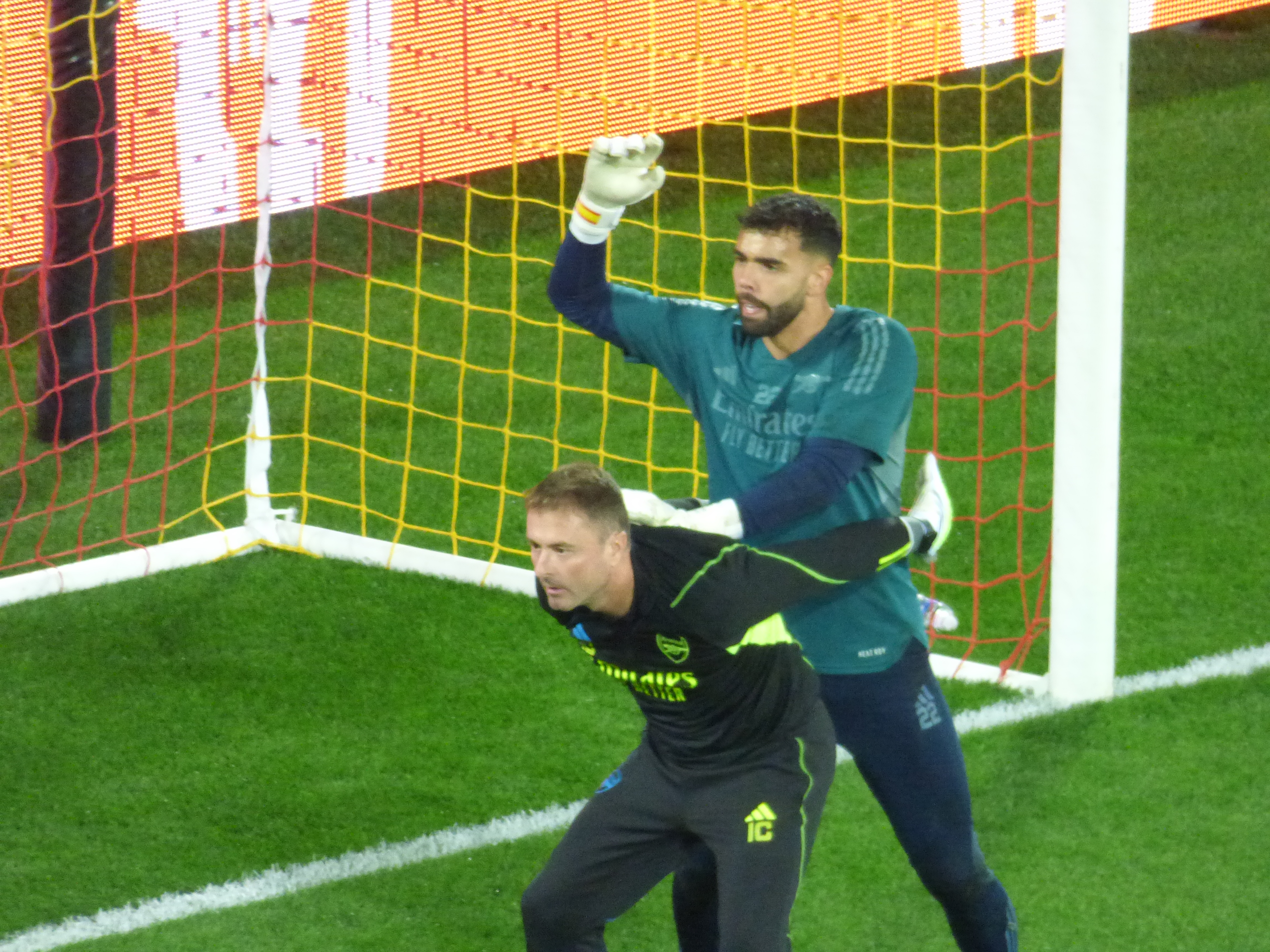
- Caña (left) in 2023

Personal information
- Full name: Iñaki Caña Pavón
- Date of birth: 19 September 1975 (age 51)
- Place of birth: Barcelona, Spain
- Height: 1.75 m (5 ft 9 in)
- Position: Goalkeeper

Team information
- Current team: Arsenal (goalkeeping coach)

Youth career
- –1994: Barcelona

Senior career*
Years	Team	Apps	(Gls)
1994–1996	Barcelona C	11	(0)
1996–1997	Yeclano	6	(0)
1997–1998	Terrassa	1	(0)
1998–1999	Yeclano	2	(0)
Total		20	(0)
- * Club domestic league appearances and goals

Iñaki Caña Pavón (Spanish pronunciation: [iˈɲaki ˈkaɲa paˈβon]; born 19 September 1975) is a Spanish retired footballer who played as a goalkeeper, and is currently the goalkeeping coach of Premier League club Arsenal.

== Playing career ==
Born in Barcelona, Catalonia, Caña came through the youth ranks of local side Barcelona. He then played for Barcelona C – a reserve team of the Spanish giants – in Segunda División B, but never made a first-team appearance. After spending one year at Terrassa and two seasons at Yeclano, Caña retired from the game in 1999.

== Coaching career ==
Caña created his own goalkeeper academy in Barcelona in 2013. From July 2015 to January 2017, he worked as goalkeeping coach at Sabadell in the third tier of Spanish football. Afterwards, Caña joined Danish side Nordsjælland, helping them finish third in the 2017–18 Superliga.

=== Brentford ===
In June 2018, Caña moved to England as first-team goalkeeping coach of then-Championship club Brentford. In the 2018–19 season, he shared the same office with set-piece coach Nicolas Jover, who would join Premier League club Arsenal in July 2021.

Caña played a major part in Spanish goalkeeper David Raya's transfer from Blackburn Rovers to Brentford in the summer of 2019. He left his role of first-team goalkeeping coach in December 2019, and was replaced by Andy Quy. Caña and Raya remained friends, and the latter went on to share the 2019–20 Championship Golden Glove award with Millwall goalkeeper Bartosz Białkowski, and helped the Bees get promoted to the Premier League in the following season via the play-offs.

=== Arsenal ===
On 20 December 2019, Arsenal appointed former club captain Mikel Arteta – who was 37 years old then and had never managed before – as the new head coach. Four days later, Caña was appointed as goalkeeping coach at Arsenal, with assistant coaches Albert Stuivenberg and Steve Round also joining Arteta's backroom staff. They led the team to a record-extending 14th FA Cup win on 1 August 2020, beating Chelsea 2–1 at Wembley Stadium. Caña was also part of Arteta's coaching team that guided the Gunners to win the 2020 FA Community Shield on penalties against Liverpool on 29 August 2020 and win the 2023 FA Community Shield on penalties against Manchester City on 6 August 2023.

Arsenal tried to sign David Raya in 2020 and 2021 at Caña's insistence, but they failed. Caña was a key figure in Raya's successful loan move from Brentford to Arsenal in the summer of 2023. Raya claimed the Premier League Golden Glove award in his debut campaign with the Gunners, then completed his permanent move to Arsenal in July 2024. In an exclusive interview with Sky Sports on 14 August 2024, Raya credited Caña for the role he played in his development at both Brentford and Arsenal.

== Career statistics ==
=== Club ===
Appearances and goals by club, season and competition
Club	Season	League			Copa del Rey		Total	
Club	Season	Division	Apps	Goals	Apps	Goals	Apps	Goals
Barcelona C	1995–96	Segunda División B	11	0	—		11	0
Yeclano	1996–97	Segunda División B	6	0	—		6	0
Terrassa	1997–98	Segunda División B	1	0	—		1	0
Yeclano	1998–99	Segunda División B	2	0	—		2	0
Career total			20	0	0	0	20	0
