= CE Felanitx =

Felanitx
- Full name: Club Esportiu Felanitx
- Founded: 1932 (as Gimnástica Felanitx); 1943 (refounded)
- Ground: Es Torrentó-Mariona Caldentey, Felanitx, Balearic Islands, Spain
- Capacity: 2,000
- Chairman: Francisco Rodríguez
- Manager: Jaume Mut
- League: División de Honor – Mallorca
- 2025–26: Tercera Federación – Group 11, 17th of 18 (relegated)
| Home colours | Away colours |

Club Esportiu Felanitx (Spanish: Club Deportivo Felantich) is a Spanish football team based in Felanitx, in the autonomous community of Balearic Islands. Founded in 1943, it plays in División de Honor – Mallorca, holding home matches at Estadio Es Torrentó-Mariona Caldentey.

== History ==
Gimnástica Felanitx Fútbol Club were founded in 1932, being later renamed to Sociedad Deportiva Gimnástica Felanitx in 1941. In 1943, the club was reformed into Club Deportivo Felanitx.

Felanitx achieved a first-ever promotion to Tercera División in 1955, and subsequently played for seven consecutive seasons in that division. After being inactive during the 1964–65 and 1965–66 seasons, the club only played in the regional leagues until 1971, when they were replaced by their reserve team Club Deportivo Atlético Felanitx, founded a year earlier.

=== Club background ===
- Gimnástica Felanitx Fútbol Club (1932–1941)
- Sociedad Deportiva Gimnástica Felanitx (1941–1943)
- Club Deportivo Felanitx (1943–1971)
- Club Deportivo Felanitx Atlético (1970–1976)
- Club Esportiu Felanitx (1976–)

== Season to season ==
=== CD Felanitx (1932–1971) ===
| Season | Tier | Division | Place | Copa del Rey |
|---|---|---|---|---|
| 1932–1941 | — | Regional | — | |
| 1941–42 | 3 | 1ª Reg. | 6th | |
| 1942–43 | 3 | 1ª Reg. | 5th | |
| 1943–44 | 4 | 1ª Reg. | 6th | |
| 1944–45 | 5 | 3ª Reg. | 3rd | |
| 1945–46 | 5 | 3ª Reg. | | |
| 1946–47 | 5 | 3ª Reg. | 4th | |
| 1947–48 | 5 | 3ª Reg. | 8th | |
| 1948–49 | 5 | 3ª Reg. | 5th | |
| 1949–50 | 4 | 1ª Reg. | 9th | |
| 1950–51 | 4 | 1ª Reg. | 10th | |
| 1951–52 | 4 | 1ª Reg. | | |
| 1952–53 | 4 | 1ª Reg. | 12th | |
| 1953–54 | 4 | 1ª Reg. | 15th | |
| 1954–55 | 4 | 1ª Reg. | 1st | |
| 1955–56 | 4 | 1ª Reg. | 3rd | |

| Season | Tier | Division | Place | Copa del Rey |
|---|---|---|---|---|
| 1956–57 | 3 | 3ª | 3rd | |
| 1957–58 | 3 | 3ª | 8th | |
| 1958–59 | 3 | 3ª | 7th | |
| 1959–60 | 3 | 3ª | 15th | |
| 1960–61 | 3 | 3ª | 5th | |
| 1961–62 | 3 | 3ª | 8th | |
| 1962–63 | 3 | 3ª | 8th | |
| 1963–64 | DNP | | | |
| 1964–65 | DNP | | | |
| 1965–66 | DNP | | | |
| 1966–67 | 5 | 2ª Reg. | | |
| 1967–68 | 5 | 2ª Reg. | 3rd | |
| 1968–69 | 5 | 2ª Reg. | 3rd | |
| 1969–70 | 5 | 2ª Reg. | 11th | |
| 1970–71 | 4 | 1ª Reg. | 16th | |

- 7 seasons in Tercera División

=== CE Felanitx (1970) ===
| Season | Tier | Division | Place | Copa del Rey |
|---|---|---|---|---|
| 1970–71 | 5 | 2ª Reg. | 13th | |
| 1971–72 | 5 | 2ª Reg. | 6th | |
| 1972–73 | 6 | 2ª Reg. | 9th | |
| 1973–74 | 6 | 2ª Reg. | 10th | |
| 1974–75 | 6 | 2ª Reg. | 5th | |
| 1975–76 | 6 | 2ª Reg. | 1st | |
| 1976–77 | 5 | 1ª Reg. | 2nd | |
| 1977–78 | 5 | Reg. Pref. | 2nd | |
| 1978–79 | 5 | Reg. Pref. | 1st | |
| 1979–80 | 4 | 3ª | 8th | First round |
| 1980–81 | 4 | 3ª | 14th | First round |
| 1981–82 | 4 | 3ª | 8th | |
| 1982–83 | 4 | 3ª | 10th | |
| 1983–84 | 4 | 3ª | 13th | |
| 1984–85 | 4 | 3ª | 15th | |
| 1985–86 | 4 | 3ª | 19th | |
| 1986–87 | 5 | Reg. Pref. | 16th | |
| 1987–88 | 5 | Reg. Pref. | 6th | |
| 1988–89 | 4 | 3ª | 7th | |
| 1989–90 | 4 | 3ª | 19th | |

| Season | Tier | Division | Place | Copa del Rey |
|---|---|---|---|---|
| 1990–91 | 5 | Reg. Pref. | 9th | |
| 1991–92 | 5 | Reg. Pref. | 13th | |
| 1992–93 | 5 | Reg. Pref. | 16th | |
| 1993–94 | 5 | Reg. Pref. | 6th | |
| 1994–95 | 4 | 3ª | 20th | |
| 1995–96 | 5 | Reg. Pref. | 2nd | |
| 1996–97 | 4 | 3ª | 19th | |
| 1997–98 | 5 | Reg. Pref. | 15th | |
| 1998–99 | 5 | Reg. Pref. | 5th | |
| 1999–2000 | 4 | 3ª | 18th | |
| 2000–01 | 5 | Reg. Pref. | 2nd | |
| 2001–02 | 4 | 3ª | 20th | |
| 2002–03 | 5 | Reg. Pref. | 12th | |
| 2003–04 | 5 | Reg. Pref. | 9th | |
| 2004–05 | 5 | Reg. Pref. | 1st | |
| 2005–06 | 4 | 3ª | 20th | |
| 2006–07 | 5 | Reg. Pref. | 9th | |
| 2007–08 | 5 | Reg. Pref. | 8th | |
| 2008–09 | 5 | Reg. Pref. | 16th | |
| 2009–10 | 5 | Reg. Pref. | 8th | |

| Season | Tier | Division | Place | Copa del Rey |
|---|---|---|---|---|
| 2010–11 | 4 | 3ª | 15th | |
| 2011–12 | 4 | 3ª | 13th | |
| 2012–13 | 4 | 3ª | 15th | |
| 2013–14 | 4 | 3ª | 19th | |
| 2014–15 | 5 | Reg. Pref. | 15th | |
| 2015–16 | 5 | Reg. Pref. | 1st | |
| 2016–17 | 4 | 3ª | 13th | |
| 2017–18 | 4 | 3ª | 4th | |
| 2018–19 | 4 | 3ª | 11th | |
| 2019–20 | 4 | 3ª | 4th | |
| 2020–21 | 4 | 3ª | 9th / 3rd | |
| 2021–22 | 5 | 3ª RFEF | 18th | |
| 2022–23 | 6 | Reg. Pref. | 1st | |
| 2023–24 | 5 | 3ª Fed. | 14th | |
| 2024–25 | 5 | 3ª Fed. | 13th | |
| 2025–26 | 5 | 3ª Fed. | | |

- 23 seasons in Tercera División
- 4 seasons in Tercera Federación/Tercera División RFEF
