= Albert Stuivenberg =

Dutch football player and coach

Personal information
- Date of birth: 5 August 1970 (age 56)
- Place of birth: Rotterdam, Netherlands
- Height: 1.72 m (5 ft 8 in)
- Position: Attacking midfielder

Team information
- Current team: Arsenal (assistant)

Youth career
- Feyenoord

Senior career*
| Years | Team | Apps | (Gls) |
- HFC Haarlem
- Telstar

International career
| 1986 | Netherlands U17 | 2 | (0) |

Managerial career
- 2006–2013: Netherlands U17
- 2013–2014: Netherlands U21
- 2017: Genk
- * Club domestic league appearances and goals

Albert Stuivenberg (Dutch pronunciation: [ˈstœyvə(m)bɛr(ə)x]; born 5 August 1970) is a Dutch professional football coach and former player who is currently the assistant manager of Premier League club Arsenal.

Stuivenberg played professionally for Telstar and HFC Haarlem, before suffering a serious injury and moving into coaching with Feyenoord and RWD Molenbeek. He then coached the youth team at Al Jazira and the Netherlands under-17 and under-21 national teams. He was appointed as assistant coach to Louis van Gaal at Manchester United in 2014, before making his managerial debut with Genk in 2017. Stuivenberg became assistant manager to Ryan Giggs for the Wales national team in 2018, before joining Arsenal in December 2019.

== Career ==
Born in Rotterdam, Stuivenberg began his playing career in the academy of his local club, Feyenoord, but was unable to break into the first team and moved to HFC Haarlem. He later joined Telstar, but tore cruciate ligaments in 1986, which forced his premature retirement three years later in 1989.

After retiring, Stuivenberg moved into coaching and was educated at the CIOS sports academy in Overveen. In 1992, he was given a job as a youth coach with his former club, Feyenoord, where he later became head of youth in 2001. He spent the 2000–01 season as an assistant first-team coach with Feyenoord's Belgian feeder club, Racing White Daring Molenbeek. After spending 13 years coaching at Feyenoord, working with the likes of Robin van Persie, he moved to Al Jazira in Abu Dhabi, United Arab Emirates in 2004 to head their youth system.

After two years in the Middle East, he returned to the Netherlands to take over as the coach of the under-17s national team. He twice led the team to victory in the UEFA European Under-17 Championship, in 2011 and 2012, leading to his promotion to manage the under-21s. Stuivenberg also scouted for the Royal Dutch Football Association (KNVB) and educated professional coaches at the KNVB Academy.

=== Manchester United ===
In July 2014, Stuivenberg was appointed as an assistant coach at Manchester United by new manager Louis van Gaal, working alongside assistant manager Ryan Giggs. On 23 May 2016, two days after winning the 2016 FA Cup, it was announced that van Gaal had been relieved of his management duties. As part of his coaching team, it was also announced that Stuivenberg had departed the club.

=== Genk and Wales national team ===
In January 2017, he started a new coaching job at Genk. He replaced Peter Maes, who was sacked because of an unsatisfactory ranking in the Belgian First Division A. Despite leading the club to the quarter-finals of the 2016–17 UEFA Europa League, Stuivenberg was fired on 10 December 2017. In 2018, he was appointed as assistant manager of the Wales national team, working under his former Manchester United colleague Ryan Giggs.

=== Arsenal ===
On 24 December 2019, Stuivenberg was announced as an assistant coach to Mikel Arteta at Arsenal, with assistant coach Steve Round and goalkeeping coach Iñaki Caña also joining the club. They led the team to a record-extending 14th FA Cup win on 1 August 2020, beating Chelsea 2–1 at Wembley Stadium.

On 26 July 2021, Stuivenberg left his position as Wales assistant coach to focus on his role at Arsenal. On 1 January 2022, Stuivenberg took charge of Arsenal in a 2–1 defeat to Manchester City, as manager Mikel Arteta had tested positive for COVID-19 and was forced to miss the match. On 9 December 2023, Stuivenberg took charge of Arsenal in a 1-0 defeat at Aston Villa, as manager Mikel Arteta had been banned from the touchline, having received three yellow cards to that point in the Premier League 2023/24 Season. Arteta watched the match from the Directors' Box, but took part in his media commitments after the game.

== Managerial statistics ==
As of match played December 2017

Managerial record by team and tenure
| Team | From | To | Record | | | | | Ref. |
| Team | From | To | P | W | D | L | Win % | Ref. |
|---|---|---|---|---|---|---|---|---|
| Genk | 27 December 2016 | 10 December 2017 | 48 | 23 | 15 | 10 | 47.9 | |
| Total | | | 48 | 23 | 15 | 10 | 47.9 | — |

== Honours ==
=== Manager ===
Netherlands U17

- UEFA European Under-17 Championship: 2011, 2012

=== Assistant Coach ===
Arsenal

- English Premier League: Champion 2025-26.
