= Steve Round =

English football coach (born 1970)

Personal information
- Full name: Stephen John Round
- Date of birth: 9 November 1970 (age 56)
- Place of birth: Burton upon Trent, England
- Position: Full-back

Team information
- Current team: Derby County (assistant coach)

Senior career*
Years	Team	Apps	(Gls)
1990–1995	Derby County	9	(0)
1995–1996	Nuneaton Borough		
- * Club domestic league appearances and goals

Stephen John Round (born 9 November 1970) is an English professional football coach and former player. He is currently a part-time assistant first-team coach at Derby County. He was assistant first-team coach of Premier League club Arsenal until 6 July 2023.

After a brief playing career operating as a full-back, representing both Derby County and Nuneaton Borough, he went into coaching, serving in assistant coaching roles at Derby County, Middlesbrough, Newcastle United, Everton, Manchester United, Arsenal and the England national team, in which he has overseen several major trophy wins, in addition to a spell as director of football at Aston Villa.

== Playing career ==
As a player, Round was a full-back with Derby County, before being forced to retire early through injury after only nine league appearances. He joined the club's coaching staff, and it was here that he first worked with Steve McClaren. When McClaren was appointed Middlesbrough manager in 2001, he appointed Round to his coaching staff.

== Coaching career ==
After retiring as a player, Round ventured in coaching, returning to Derby County in 1996 as part of Jim Smith's coaching staff, where he worked alongside Steve McClaren. When McClaren became the manager of Middlesbrough in 2001, Round joined his backroom coaching staff, initially taking up responsibility for their reserves team, before establishing himself as one of McClaren's assistant first team coaches. During their period at Middlesbrough, they oversaw the club win their first major trophy when they won the 2003–04 Football League Cup, beating Bolton Wanderers 2–0 at the Millennium Stadium, in addition to reaching the 2005–06 UEFA Cup final, where they lost 4–0 to Sevilla.

McClaren was named as the head coach of the England national team, leaving Middlesbrough shortly after the European final defeat. Round again was appointed as part of his backroom staff, though opted to continue at Middlesbrough in a dual role under new manager and retiring club captain Gareth Southgate; however, he left the club on 15 December 2006, following a "difference in philosophy and ideas" with Southgate. McClaren's spell in charge of England was ultimately short-lived and unsuccessful: he and his coaching staff were sacked in November 2007, having failed to qualify for UEFA Euro 2008, the first time they missed this competition since UEFA Euro 1984 and their first failure to qualify for a tournament since 1993.

On 1 July 2007, Round joined Newcastle United as a first team assistant coach under Sam Allardyce. Round was retained in his position after Allardyce was sacked in January 2008 with Kevin Keegan replacing him, though departed the club to become the assistant coach to David Moyes at fellow Premier League side Everton in July 2008, replacing Alan Irvine, who had left midway through the previous season. During Round's first season with the Merseyside-based club, they reached the FA Cup final, where they were defeated 2–1 by Chelsea at Wembley Stadium.

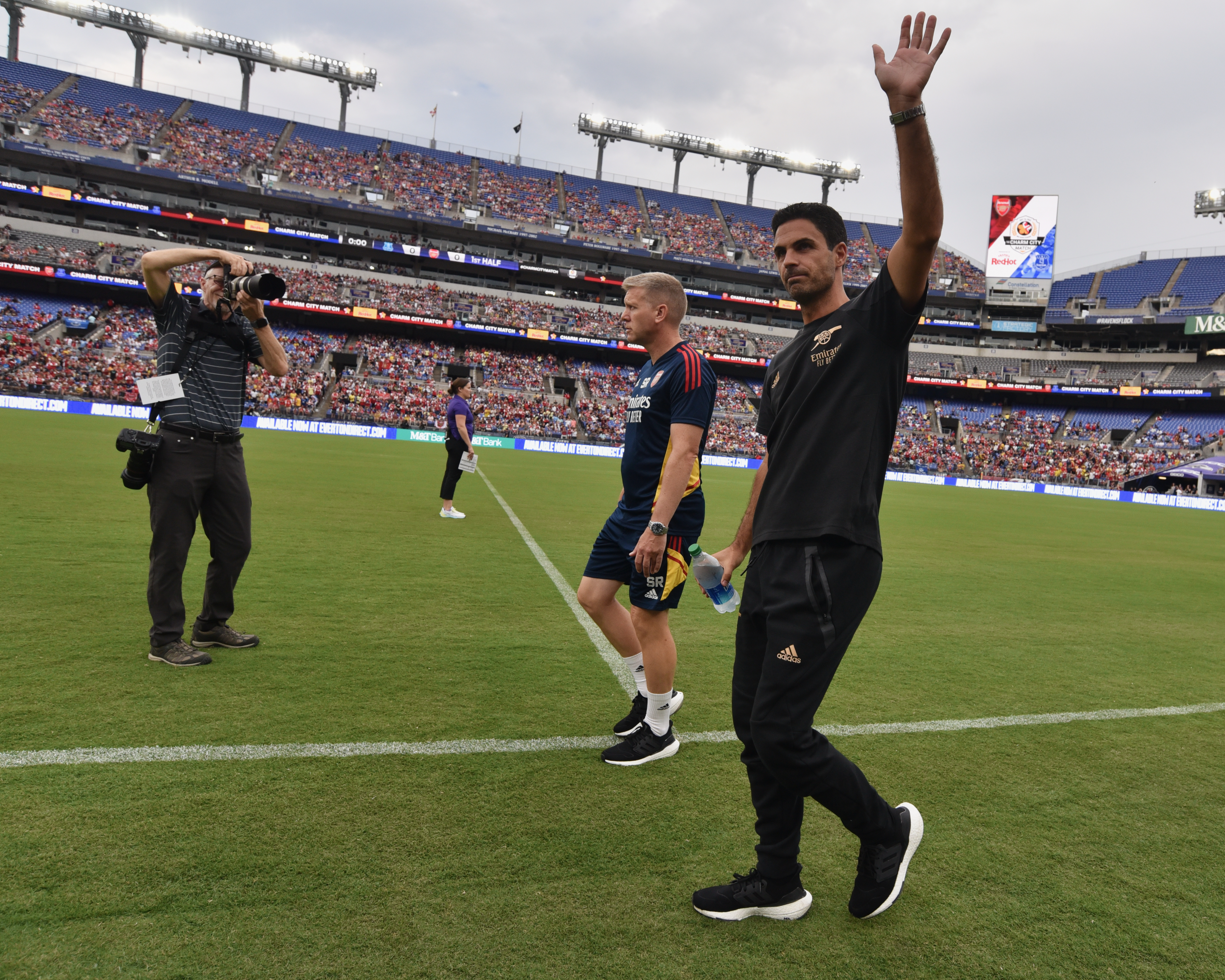
Round as an assistant coach to Mikel Arteta (right) at Arsenal in 2022

Moyes was elected to replace long-serving manager Alex Ferguson at Manchester United ahead of the 2013–14 season, entering the league campaign as the reigning champions of England. In May 2013, it was confirmed that Round would follow Moyes to United, again acting as his assistant manager, with various members of Moyes' coaching staff also moving from Everton due to the Scotsman's desire to appoint his own coaching staff. Despite winning the FA Community Shield, Moyes' tenure at United failed to last a full season, with poor results within the Premier League and League Cup justifying the dismissal of Moyes and his coaching staff, including Round, on 22 April 2014.

Round was reunited with McClaren in January 2015, having not worked together in several years, as Round returned to Derby County to act as his assistant coach. McClaren was dismissed at the end of the 2014–15 season after failing to gain promotion to the Premier League;

On 1 September 2016, Round was appointed as the director of football at Aston Villa, who had recently been relegated from the Premier League the previous season. Roberto Di Matteo was initially the club's manager upon Round's arrival, though he was dismissed in October after a poor start to the Championship season. Steve Bruce replaced him and guided the club to the promotion play-off final the following league campaign, missing out on promotion to the Premier League by suffering a 1–0 defeat to Fulham. Shortly after the club had been taken over by a new group of investors, Round left his position as director of football on 4 July 2018.

On 24 December 2019, Round returned to the Premier League after being appointed as an assistant first team coach at Arsenal under newly appointed head coach Mikel Arteta, with assistant coach Albert Stuivenberg and goalkeeping coach Iñaki Caña also joining the club. During Arteta's first year in charge, Arsenal were able to win both the 2019–20 FA Cup and the 2020 FA Community Shield, in a period heavily affected by the COVID-19 pandemic. Round departed the club on good terms in July 2023.

On 19 February 2025, Round returned to Derby County as a first-team assistant under new Derby head coach John Eustace on a part-time basis.

He is a graduate of Manchester Metropolitan University's Masters of Sport Directorship programme.
