= Set piece (football) =

Type of play in football

The term set piece or set play is used in association football and rugby football to refer to a situation when the ball is returned to open play, for example following a stoppage, particularly in a forward area of the pitch. In association football, the term usually refers to free kicks and corners, but sometimes penalties, throw-ins and kick-offs. Many goals result from such positions, whether scored directly or indirectly. Thus defending set pieces is an important skill for defenders, and attacking players spend much time practicing them; set pieces are one area where tactics and routines can be worked out in training in advance of matches. Some players specialize in set pieces.
