= Divisiones Regionales de Fútbol in Balearic Islands =

The Divisiones Regionales de Fútbol in the Balearic Islands, are organized by Balearic Football Federation :

- División de Honor de Mallorca (Level 6 of the Spanish football pyramid)
- División de Honor de Menorca (formerly Regional Preferente de Menorca) (Level 6)
- División de Honor de Ibiza y Formentera (formerly Regional Preferente de Ibiza y Formentera) (Level 6)
- Regional Preferente de Mallorca (Level 7 in Mallorca)
- Primera Regional de Mallorca (Level 8 in Mallorca)
- Segunda Regional de Mallorca (Level 9 in Mallorca)

== League chronology ==
Timeline

== División de Honor de Mallorca ==
División de Honor
- Founded: Unknown
- Country: Spain
- Number of clubs: 18
- Level on pyramid: 6
- Promotion to: 3ª Federación – Group 11
- Relegation to: Regional Preferente
- Website: http://www.ffib.es/

The División de Honor de Mallorca is one of the lower levels of the Spanish Football League. It is held every year. It stands at the sixth level of Spanish football. All of the clubs are based on the island of Mallorca.

=== The League ===
The league consists of two groups of 16 teams. At the end of the season, the champion is promoted to Tercera Federación - Group 11 while the next six clubs (runner-up through 7th place) advance to promotion playoff. Bottom three teams are relegated to Primera Regional de las Islas Baleares.

The league was called Primera Regional Preferente de Mallorca until 2024, when División de Honor was established as the name for all sixth tier competitions in the Balearic Islands. After that change, Regional Preferente became the seventh tier in Mallorca.

=== 2025–26 season teams ===
Club
- UE Alaró
- UE Alcúdia B
- CE Andratx B
- UD Arenal
- CD Atlético Rafal
- CE Campos
- CE Esporles
- CD Ferriolense
- FC Inter Manacor
- CF Platges de Calvià B
- Pórtol FC
- Club Recreativo La Victoria
- CD Sant Jordi
- Club Santa Catalina Atlético
- CD Serverense
- CE Sineu
- CF Sóller
- UD Son Verí

=== Champions ===
Season	Team
2025–26	CE Andratx B
2024–25	UD Rotlet-Molinar
2023–24	UE Porreres (Group A); CE Cardassar (Group B)
2022–23	CE Felanitx (Group A); UE Alcúdia (Group B)
2021–22	FC Inter Manacor
2020–21	CE Campos (Group A); UD Rotlet-Molinar (Group B)
2019–20	CE Cardassar
2018–19	CE Andratx
2017–18	CF Sóller
2016–17	CD Manacor
2015–16	CE Felanitx
2014–15	Santa Catalina Atlético
2013–14	CF Sóller

== División de Honor de Menorca ==
División de Honor
- Founded: Unknown
- Country: Spain
- Number of clubs: 11
- Level on pyramid: 6
- Promotion to: 3ª Federación – Group 11
- Relegation to: None
- Website: http://www.ffib.es/

The División de Honor de Menorca (formerly Regional Preferente de Menorca) is one of the lower levels of the Spanish Football League. It stands at the sixth level of Spanish football with teams five promotions away from the top division. Teams from this league progress into the Tercera Federación - Group 11 via Play Offs against teams from Evissa and Mallorca. The participating teams are based on the island of Menorca.

=== The League ===
The División de Honor is played with 11 clubs. At the end of the season, the champion advances to the promotion playoff.

=== 2025–26 season teams ===
Club
- CE Alaior
- Atlético Villacarlos CF
- Ciutadella CE
- CE Ferreries
- UD Mahón
- CD Menorca
- CD Migjorn
- CF Norteño
- Penya Ciutadella Esportiva
- CCE Sant Lluís
- CF Sporting de Mahón

=== Champions ===
Season	Team
2025–26	Migjorn
2024–25	Sporting Mahón
2023–24	Migjorn
2022–23	Alaior
2021–22	Menorca
2020–21	Mercadal
2019–20	Mercadal
2018–19	Mahón

== División de Honor Ibiza/Formentera ==
División de Honor Ibiza/Formentera
- Founded: Unknown
- Country: Spain
- Number of clubs: 12
- Level on pyramid: 6
- Promotion to: 3ª Federación – Group 11
- Relegation to: None
- Website: http://www.ffib.es/

The División de Honor de Ibiza y Formentera (formerly Regional Preferente de Ibiza y Formentera) is the sixth level of association football in Ibiza & Formentera (Balearic Islands).

=== The League ===
The winner advances to a promotion playoff against three teams from División de Honor de Mallorca.

=== 2025–26 season teams ===
Club
- Bahía San Agustín
- Formentera B
- Ibiza B
- Luchador
- Peña Deportiva B
- PE Sant Jordi
- Sant Josep
- Sant Rafel
- Santa Gertrudis
- Ses Païsses

=== Champions ===
Season	Team
2025–26	PE Sant Jordi
2024–25	Inter Ibiza (promoted)
2023–24	PE Sant Jordi (promoted)
2022–23	Inter Ibiza
2021–22	Peña Deportiva B
2020–21	Inter Ibiza (promoted)
2019–20	Sant Jordi (promoted)
2018–19	Portmany (promoted)
2017–18	Ibiza IP (promoted)
2016–17	UD Ibiza (promoted)
2015–16	Ciudad de Ibiza
2014–15	Sant Jordi
2013–14	Portmany
2012–13	Portmany
2011–12	Formentera (promoted)
2010–11	At. Isleño

== Preferente Regional de Mallorca ==
Preferente Regional
- Founded: Unknown
- Country: Spain
- Number of clubs: 18
- Level on pyramid: 7
- Promotion to: División de Honor de Mallorca
- Relegation to: Primera Regional de Mallorca
- Website: http://www.ffib.es/

Preferente Regional de Mallorca is the seventh level of competition of the Spanish Football League in Mallorca, in the Balearic Islands.

=== The League ===
The Preferente Regional is played with 18 teams. At the end of the season, the first two are directly promoted, with one club being promoted through the play-offs. Three clubs are relegated to Primera Regional.

== Primera Regional de Mallorca ==
Primera Regional
- Founded: Unknown
- Country: Spain
- Number of clubs: 36; 2 groups of 18
- Level on pyramid: 8
- Promotion to: Preferente Regional
- Relegation to: Segunda Regional
- Website: http://www.ffib.es/

Primera Regional de Mallorca is the eight level of competition of the Spanish Football League in Mallorca, in the Balearic Islands.

=== The League ===
The Primera Regional is played with two groups of 18 teams each. At the end of the season, the first three are promoted. Three clubs are relegated to Segunda Regional.

== Segunda Regional de Mallorca ==
Segunda Regional
- Founded: Unknown
- Country: Spain
- Number of clubs: 46; 2 groups of 15 and 1 group of 16
- Level on pyramid: 8
- Promotion to: Primera Regional
- Website: http://www.ffib.es/

Segunda Regional de Mallorca is the ninth level of competition of the Spanish Football League in Mallorca, in the Balearic Islands.

=== The League ===
The Segunda Regional is played with two groups of 16 teams each, and one group of 15 teams. At the end of the season, the top three clubs are promoted.
