= 2014 Tercera División play-offs =

Spanish football league play-offs

The 2014 Tercera División play-offs to Segunda División B from Tercera División (Promotion play-offs) were the final playoffs for the promotion from 2013–14 Tercera División to 2014–15 Segunda División B. The first four teams in each group took part in the play-off.

== Format ==
The eighteen group winners have the opportunity to be promoted directly to Segunda División B. The eighteen group winners were drawn into a two-legged series where the nine winners will promote to Segunda División B. The nine losing clubs will enter the play-off round for the last nine promotion spots.

The eighteen runners-up were drawn against one of the eighteen fourth-placed clubs outside their group and the eighteen third-placed clubs were drawn against one another in a two-legged series. The twenty-seven winners will advance with the nine losing clubs from the champions' series to determine the eighteen teams that will enter the last two-legged series for the last nine promotion spots. In all the playoff series, the lower-ranked club play at home first. Whenever there is a tie in position (e.g. like the group winners in the champions' series or the third-placed teams in the first round), a draw determines the club to play at home first.

== Group Winners promotion play-off ==
=== Qualified teams ===
The draw took place in the RFEF headquarters, in Las Rozas (Madrid), on 12 May 2014, 17:00 CEST.

Group	Team
1	Somozas
2	Lealtad
3	Gimnástica
4	Leioa
5	Cornellà
6	Eldense
7	Trival Valderas
8	Valladolid B
9	Marbella

Group	Team
10	Betis B
11	Mallorca B
12	Atlético Granadilla
13	UCAM Murcia
14	Villanovense
15	Izarra
16	Varea
17	Zaragoza B
18	Puertollano

=== Matches ===
Team 1	Agg.	Team 2	1st leg	2nd leg
Varea	1–7	Leioa	1–4	0–3
UCAM Murcia	3–2	Betis B	2–1	1–1
Valladolid B	4–3	Somozas	3–1	1–2
Eldense	2–3 (aet)	Marbella	1–0	1–3
Trival Valderas	2–4	Zaragoza B	1–1	1–3
Gimnástica	1–4	Villanovense	1–1	0–3
Mallorca B	4–1	Atlético Granadilla	3–0	1–1
Izarra	2–4	Cornellà	1–1	1–3
Puertollano	1–1 (p)	Lealtad	1–0	0–1

==== First leg ====
18 May 2014	Trival Valderas	1 – 1	Zaragoza B	Alcorcón
11:30 (CEST)	Joaquín 21'	Report	Pablo Moreno 62'	Stadium: La Canaleja; Attendance: 1,000; Referee: González Hernández

18 May 2014	Varea	1 – 4	Leioa	Logroño
12:00 (CEST)	Chimbo 45' (pen.)	Report	Yurrebaso 13', 81', 89'; Etxabe 52'	Stadium: Municipal; Attendance: 1,000; Referee: Navarro Polo

18 May 2014	Valladolid B	3 – 1	Somozas	Valladolid
12:00 (CEST)	Amaro 10'; Rubén Díaz 61' (pen.); Iván Casado 89'	Report	Luis Ángel 69' (pen.)	Stadium: Anexos de Zorrilla; Attendance: 800; Referee: Torres Carrión

18 May 2014	Mallorca B	3 – 0	Atlético Granadilla	Palma
12:00 (CEST)	Brandon 38', 81'; Company 69'	Report		Stadium: Son Bibiloni; Attendance: 400; Referee: García Gallegos

18 May 2014	Izarra	1 – 1	Cornellà	Estella-Lizarra
17:00 (CEST)	Uriz 68'	Report	Dani Martí 94'	Stadium: Merkatondoa; Attendance: 800; Referee: Palencia Caballero

18 May 2014	Gimnástica	1 – 1	Villanovense	Torrelavega
18:00 (CEST)	Zalo 86'	Report	Anxo 43'	Stadium: El Malecón; Attendance: 1,700; Referee: Mosqueira Antón

18 May 2014	UCAM Murcia	2 – 1	Real Betis B	Sangonera la Verde
18:30 (CEST)	Andrés Carrasco 30', 55'		Isuardi 85' (pen.)	Stadium: El Mayayo; Attendance: 1,200; Referee: Escriche Guzmán

18 May 2014	Puertollano	1 – 0	Lealtad	Puertollano
19:30 (CEST)	Rubén Moreno 83'	Report		Stadium: Ciudad de Puertollano; Attendance: 3,500; Referee: Pardo Martínez

18 May 2014	Eldense	1 – 0	Marbella	Elda
21:00 (CEST)	Cañadas 62'	Report		Stadium: Nuevo Pepico Amat; Attendance: 3,000; Referee: Carballal Vales

==== Second leg ====
24 May 2014	Marbella	3 – 1 (a.e.t.) (3–2 agg.)	Eldense	Marbella
18:15 (CEST)	Airam 89'; Pibe 105'; Añón 120' (pen.)	Report	Chupe 105'	Stadium: Municipal; Attendance: 5,200; Referee: Álvarez Morán

24 May 2014	Leioa	3 – 0 (7–1 agg.)	Varea	Leioa
19:00 (CEST)	Etxabe 25'; Córdoba 60'; Polanco 70'	Report		Stadium: Sarriena; Attendance: 1,000; Referee: Varela Cabrero

24 May 2014	Atlético Granadilla	1 – 1 (1–4 agg.)	Mallorca B	Granadilla de Abona
19:00 (WEST)	Javi Marchena 27'	Report	Cedric 34'	Stadium: Francisco Suárez; Attendance: 350; Referee: Romero de Ávila Vera

25 May 2014	Zaragoza B	3 – 1 (4–2 agg.)	Trival Valderas	Zaragoza
11:30 (CEST)	Adán Pérez 15', 53'; Meseguer 90'		Propín 13'	Stadium: La Romareda; Attendance: 8,000; Referee: Catalá Ferrán

25 May 2014	Lealtad	1 – 0 (1–1 agg.) (4 – 3 p)	Puertollano	Villaviciosa
17:00 (CEST)	Pablo Espina 44'	Report		Stadium: Les Caleyes; Attendance: 1,400; Referee: Muñiz Ruiz
	Penalties
	Castaño (penalty scored); Lombán (penalty scored); Borja (penalty scored); Pelayo (penalty scored)		(penalty scored) Javi Pérez; (penalty scored) Salva; (penalty scored) Verdú; (penalty missed) Valdivia; (penalty missed) José Manuel

25 May 2014	Somozas	2 – 1 (3–4 agg.)	Valladolid B	As Somozas
17:45 (CEST)	Antas 4'; Baleato 52'	Report	Anuar 55'	Stadium: Pardiñas; Attendance: 1,000; Referee: Barbeira Juste

25 May 2014	Villanovense	3 – 0 (4–1 agg.)	Gimnástica	Villanueva de la Serena
18:00 (CEST)	Trinidad 19'; José Ángel 39'; Juanfran 72'	Report		Stadium: Romero Cuerda; Attendance: 2,800; Referee: Alberola Rojas

25 May 2014	Betis B	1 – 1 (2–3 agg.)	UCAM Murcia	Seville
18:30 (CEST)	Sofian 50'	Report	Andrés Carrasco 78' (pen.)	Stadium: Luis del Sol; Attendance: 3,000; Referee: Fernández Fernández

25 May 2014	Cornellà	3 – 1 (4–2 agg.)	Izarra	Cornellà
19:45 (CEST)	Txemi 11'; Dani Martí 16'; Óscar Muñoz 23'	Report	Txiko 3'	Stadium: Nou Camp; Attendance: 2,500; Referee: Miralles Selma

Promoted to Segunda División B
Cornellà (First time ever)	Lealtad (15 years later)	Leioa (First time ever)	Mallorca B (One year later)	Marbella (4 years later)	UCAM Murcia (One year later)	Valladolid B (5 years later)	Villanovense (One year later)	Zaragoza B (One year later)

== Non-champions promotion play-off ==
=== First round ===
==== Qualified teams ====
The draw took place in the RFEF headquarters, in Las Rozas (Madrid), on 12 May 2014, 17:00 CEST.

Group	Position	Team
1	2nd	Cerceda
2	2nd	Langreo
3	2nd	Laredo
4	2nd	Portugalete
5	2nd	Montañesa
6	2nd	Alzira
7	2nd	Rayo Vallecano B
8	2nd	Atlético Astorga
9	2nd	Linares
10	2nd	San Roque de Lepe
11	2nd	Peña Deportiva
12	2nd	Marino
13	2nd	Yeclano
14	2nd	Mérida
15	2nd	San Juan
16	2nd	Haro
17	2nd	Teruel
18	2nd	Socuéllamos

Group	Position	Team
1	3rd	Boiro
2	3rd	Ceares
3	3rd	Rayo Cantabria
4	3rd	Arenas
5	3rd	Europa
6	3rd	Orihuela
7	3rd	Unión Adarve
8	3rd	Arandina
9	3rd	Atlético Malagueño
10	3rd	Alcalá
11	3rd	Formentera
12	3rd	Mensajero
13	3rd	Águilas
14	3rd	Jerez
15	3rd	Mutilvera
16	3rd	Anguiano
17	3rd	Ejea
18	3rd	Villarrobledo

Group	Position	Team
1	4th	Pontevedra
2	4th	Praviano
3	4th	Escobedo
4	5th	Alavés B
5	4th	Terrassa
6	4th	Paterna
7	4th	San Sebastián de los Reyes
8	4th	Real Ávila
9	4th	Loja
10	4th	Ceuta
11	4th	Binissalem
12	4th	Tenerife B
13	4th	Mar Menor
14	4th	Badajoz CF
15	4th	Osasuna B
16	4th	Náxara
17	5th	Atlético Monzón
18	4th	Almansa

==== Matches ====
Team 1	Agg.	Team 2	1st leg	2nd leg
Badajoz CF	1–2 (aet)	Haro	1–1	1–2
Loja	1–1 (a)	Alzira	1–1	0–0
Binissalem	1–3	Atlético Astorga	1–1	0–2
Osasuna B	2–3	Yeclano	1–1	1–2
Anguiano	2–1	Peña Deportiva	1–1	1–0
Alavés B	3–4	Teruel	1–1	2–3
Pontevedra	3–2	Portugalete	1–1	2–1
Real Ávila	0–3	Mérida	0–1	0–2
Atlético Monzón	0–3	Langreo	0–1	0–2
Escobedo	1–9	Rayo Vallecano B	1–5	0–4
Ceuta	1–3	Laredo	1–2	0–1
Tenerife B	4–1	Cerceda	3–1	1–0
San Sebastián de los Reyes	3–0	Marino	1–0	2–0
Almansa	0–2 (aet)	San Roque de Lepe	0–0	0–2
Praviano	1–3	Socuéllamos	0–1	1–2
Terrassa	0–1	Linares	0–1	0–0
Mar Menor	0–1	San Juan	0–0	0–1
Paterna	2–5	Montañesa	1–2	1–3
Águilas	1–2	Ceares	1–1	0–1
Europa	1–0	Mutilvera	1–0	0–0
Arandina	2–0	Alcalá	1–0	1–0
Formentera	1–1 (a)	Villarrobledo	0–0	1–1
Náxara	3–1	Boiro	2–1	1–0
Rayo Cantabria	0–4	Mensajero	0–2	0–2
Ejea	1–2	Atlético Malagueño	0–2	1–0
Jerez	0–4	Arenas	0–0	0–4
Orihuela	2–0	Unión Adarve	2–0	0–0

===== First leg =====
17 May 2014	Arandina	1 – 0	Alcalá	Aranda de Duero
20:15 (CEST)	Gustavo 41'	Report		Stadium: El Montecillo; Attendance: 1,400; Referee: Olivera Sánchez

17 May 2014	Ceuta	1 – 2	Laredo	Ceuta
21:00 (CEST)	Perita 62'	Report	Juanlu 27'; Bubu 77'	Stadium: Alfonso Murube; Attendance: 1,500; Referee: Sáez Vital

18 May 2014	Rayo Cantabria	0 – 2	Mensajero	El Astillero
11:00 (CEST)		Report	Yeray 73'; Borja 84'	Stadium: La Planchada; Attendance: 250; Referee: Becerril Gómez

18 May 2014	Osasuna B	1 – 1	Yeclano	Pamplona
11:30 (CEST)	Manjón 65'	Report	Domenech 70'	Stadium: Tajonar; Attendance: 700; Referee: Azkuenaga Astorkuza

18 May 2014	Alavés B	1 – 1	Teruel	Vitoria-Gasteiz
11:30 (CEST)	Lafuente 36'	Report	Edu 62'	Stadium: Mendizorroza; Attendance: 2,000; Referee: García Díez

18 May 2014	Mar Menor	0 – 0	San Juan	San Javier
11:30 (CEST)		Report		Stadium: Pitín; Attendance: 1,000; Referee: Caparrós Hernández

18 May 2014	Badajoz CF	1 – 1	Haro	Badajoz
12:00 (CEST)	Javi López 77'	Report	Alberto 10'	Stadium: Nuevo Vivero; Attendance: 1,200; Referee: López Segura

18 May 2014	Anguiano	1 – 1	Peña Deportiva	Anguiano
12:00 (CEST)	Moha 21'	Report	Ayrton 36'	Stadium: La Isla; Attendance: 400; Referee: Mesón Casrillero

18 May 2014	Paterna	1 – 2	Montañesa	Paterna
12:00 (CEST)	Tello 54'	Report	Poves 18'; Nilis 27'	Stadium: Gerardo Salvador; Attendance: 1,200; Referee: Campos Salinas

18 May 2014	San Sebastián de los Reyes	1 – 0	Marino	San Sebastián de los Reyes
12:15 (CEST)	Vidal 64'	Report		Stadium: Nuevo Matapiñonera; Attendance: 300; Referee: Morena Llorens

18 May 2014	Tenerife B	3 – 1	Cerceda	Santa Cruz de Tenerife
12:00 (WEST)	Jefté 59'; Amorín 64', 78'	Report	Cano 13'	Stadium: Centro Insular; Attendance: 300; Referee: Montes García-Navas

18 May 2014	Real Ávila	0 – 1	Mérida	Mérida
17:00 (CEST)		Report	Troiteiro 86'	Stadium: Adolfo Suárez; Attendance: 1,750; Referee: Muñoz Méndez

18 May 2014	Terrassa	0 – 1	Linares	Terrassa
17:00 (CEST)		Report	Rafa Payán pen.' (63)	Stadium: Olympic; Attendance: 2,287; Referee: Gracia Villacampa

18 May 2014	Águilas	1 – 1	Ceares	Águilas
17:00 (CEST)	Ginés Meca 65'	Report	Pablo Martínez 87'	Stadium: El Rubial; Attendance: 1,300; Referee: Pérez León

18 May 2014	Binissalem	1 – 1	Atlético Astorga	Binissalem
17:30 (CEST)	Nigorra 11'	Report	Rubén 51'	Stadium: Miquel Pons; Referee: Robas Bondía

18 May 2014	Atlético Monzón	0 – 1	Langreo	Monzón
17:30 (CEST)		Report	Carly 85'	Stadium: Isidro Calderón; Attendance: 2,000; Referee: Martín Varas

18 May 2014	Formentera	0 – 0	Villarrobledo	Sant Francesc Xavier
17:30 (CEST)		Report		Stadium: Municipal; Attendance: 800; Referee: Caballero León

18 May 2014	Pontevedra	1 – 1	Portugalete	Pontevedra
18:00 (CEST)	Pablo Carnero 39'	Report	Santxo 41'	Stadium: Pasarón; Attendance: 3,500; Referee: Alonso Prendes

18 May 2014	Escobedo	1 – 5	Rayo Vallecano B	Camargo
18:00 (CEST)	Luis 40' (pen.)	Report	Toni Arranz 36'; Mario 48', 49'; Campillo 67'; Rubén Ramiro 85'	Stadium: Eusebio Arce; Attendance: 500; Referee: Granda Barros

18 May 2014	Praviano	0 – 1	Socuéllamos	Pravia
18:00 (CEST)		Report	Pablo Buendía 16'	Stadium: Santa Catalina; Attendance: 1,000; Referee: Martínez Santos

18 May 2014	Europa	1 – 0	Mutilvera	Barcelona
18:00 (CEST)	Cano 46'	Report		Stadium: Nou Sardenya; Attendance: 2,450; Referee: González Francés

18 May 2014	Náxara	2 – 1	Boiro	Nájera
18:00 (CEST)	Héctor 69', 80'	Report	Raúl Heras 57' (o.g.)	Stadium: La Salera; Referee: Recio Moreno

18 May 2014	Jerez	0 – 0	Arenas	Jerez de los Caballeros
18:00 (CEST)		Report		Stadium: Manuel Calzado Galván; Attendance: 1,400; Referee: Cadenas de Llano Delgado

18 May 2014	Almansa	0 – 0	San Roque de Lepe	Almansa
19:00 (CEST)		Report		Stadium: Municipal; Attendance: 1,400; Referee: Gea Penalva

18 May 2014	Ejea	0 – 2	Atlético Malagueño	Ejea de los Caballeros
19:00 (CEST)		Report	Rufo 39'; Samu Castillejo 47'	Stadium: Luchán; Referee: Álvarez Fernández

18 May 2014	Orihuela	2 – 0	Unión Adarve	Orihuela
19:00 (CEST)	Kike Mateo 70' (pen.); Urzaiz 80'	Report		Stadium: Los Arcos; Attendance: 1,000; Referee: Nieva López

18 May 2014	Loja	1 – 1	Alzira	Loja
21:00 (CEST)	Nino 77' (pen.)	Report	Fabassou 20'	Stadium: Medina Lauxa; Attendance: 1,100; Referee: López Fernández

===== Second leg =====
24 May 2014	Laredo	1 – 0 (3–1 agg.)	Ceuta	Laredo
17:00 (CEST)	Nacho 66'	Report		Stadium: San Lorenzo; Attendance: 1,200; Referee: Gómez Landazabal

24 May 2014	Atlético Astorga	2 – 0 (3–1 agg.)	Binissalem	Astorga
17:30 (CEST)	Puente 46'; Taranilla 93'	Report		Stadium: La Eragudina; Attendance: 2,000; Referee: Del Río Amor

24 May 2014	Boiro	0 – 1 (1–3 agg.)	Náxara	Boiro
17:30 (CEST)		Report	Rubén Quirino 32'	Stadium: Barraña; Attendance: 1,100; Referee: Rodríguez García

24 May 2014	Villarrobledo	1 – 1 (1–1 agg.)	Formentera	Villarrobledo
17:30 (CEST)	Pituli 14'	Report	Trujillo 94'	Stadium: Nuestra Señora de la Caridad; Attendance: 1,500; Referee: Moreno Navarro

24 May 2014	San Juan	1 – 0 (1–0 agg.)	Mar Menor	Pamplona
18:00 (CEST)	Iriguíbel 61'	Report		Stadium: San Juan; Attendance: 700; Referee: Baiges Dones

24 May 2014	Arenas	4 – 0 (4–0 agg.)	Jerez	Getxo
18:00 (CEST)	Lafita 2'; Arambarri 9'; David Infante 12'; Oier Artola 75'	Report		Stadium: Gobela; Attendance: 1,100; Referee: Sánchez Alba

25 May 2014	Rayo Vallecano B	4 – 0 (9–1 agg.)	Escobedo	Madrid
11:00 (CEST)	Saballs 18', 90'; Embarba 22'; Toni 53'	Report		Stadium: Ciudad Deportiva; Attendance: 300; Referee: Rodríguez Placeres

25 May 2014	Portugalete	1 – 2 (2–3 agg.)	Pontevedra	Portugalete
11:30 (CEST)	Santxo 52'	Report	Fran Fandiño 38', 68'	Stadium: La Florida; Attendance: 1,800; Referee: Vila Sánchez-Miguel

25 May 2014	Alcalá	0 – 1 (0–2 agg.)	Arandina	Alcalá de Guadaira
11:30 (CEST)		Report	Antonio 73'	Stadium: Ciudad de Alcalá; Attendance: 1,500; Referee: Gutiérrez Pérez

25 May 2014	Atlético Malagueño	0 – 1 (2–1 agg.)	Ejea	Málaga
11:30 (CEST)		Report	Mainz 23'	Stadium: La Rosaleda; Attendance: 7,000; Referee: Díaz de Mera Escuderos

25 May 2014	Unión Adarve	0 – 0 (0–2 agg.)	Orihuela	Madrid
11:30 (CEST)		Report		Stadium: Vereda de Ganapanes; Attendance: 350; Referee: Mastoras Clemente

25 May 2014	Peña Deportiva	0 – 1 (1–2 agg.)	Anguiano	Santa Eulària des Riu
12:00 (CEST)		Report	Nacho 31'	Stadium: Municipal; Attendance: 200; Referee: Subirats Matamoros

25 May 2014	Marino	0 – 2 (0–3 agg.)	San Sebastián de los Reyes	Playa de las Américas
11:00 (WEST)		Report	Lluch 5'; Héctor 67'	Stadium: Antonio Domínguez; Attendance: 300; Referee: Calderiña Pavón

25 May 2014	Mensajero	2 – 0 (4–0 agg.)	Rayo Cantabria	Santa Cruz de La Palma
12:00 (WEST)	Iray 57'; Borja 61'	Report		Stadium: Silvestre Carrillo; Attendance: 800; Referee: López Fernández-Montes

25 May 2014	Ceares	1 – 0 (2–1 agg.)	Águilas	Gijón
17:00 (CEST)	Pablo Martínez 35'	Report		Stadium: La Cruz; Attendance: 1,500; Referee: Martín Pérez

25 May 2014	Teruel	3 – 2 (4–3 agg.)	Alavés B	Teruel
18:00 (CEST)	Montejo 49'; Pascual 70'; Yuste 91'	Report	Ander 50'; Casi 83'	Stadium: Pinilla; Referee: Yuste Querol

25 May 2014	Langreo	2 – 0 (3–0 agg.)	Atlético Monzón	Langreo
18:00 (CEST)	Manu Blanco 43'; Lahílla 88' (o.g.)	Report		Stadium: Ganzábal; Attendance: 1,247; Referee: Iglesias Melón

25 May 2014	Cerceda	0 – 1 (1–4 agg.)	Tenerife B	Cerceda
18:00 (CEST)		Report	Amorín 91'	Stadium: O Roxo; Attendance: 500; Referee: Vaquero Girón

25 May 2014	Linares	0 – 0 (1–0 agg.)	Terrassa	Linares
18:00 (CEST)		Report		Stadium: Linarejos; Attendance: 5,000; Referee: Ruipérez Marín

25 May 2014	Montañesa	3 – 1 (5–2 agg.)	Paterna	Barcelona
18:00 (CEST)	Joshua 42'; Aleix 52'; Andrés Borges 77'	Report	Selu 20'	Stadium: Nou Barris; Referee: Fornes Bover

25 May 2014	Mutilvera	0 – 0 (0–1 agg.)	Europa	Aranguren
18:00 (CEST)		Report		Stadium: Valle Aranguren; Referee: Morato Cordera

25 May 2014	Haro	2 – 1 (a.e.t.) (3–2 agg.)	Badajoz CF	Haro
19:00 (CEST)	Óscar Liébana 59'; Dani Suárez 110'	Report	Torres 84'	Stadium: El Mazo; Attendance: 1,500; Referee: Abaurrea Ostiz

25 May 2014	Alzira	0 – 0 (1–1 (a) agg.)	Loja	Alzira
19:00 (CEST)		Report		Stadium: Luis Suñer Picó; Attendance: 2,000; Referee: Gallego Gambín

25 May 2014	Yeclano	2 – 1 (3–2 agg.)	Osasuna B	Yecla
19:00 (CEST)	Domènech 39', 92'	Report	Merino 67'	Stadium: La Constitución; Attendance: 2,000; Referee: Sánchez Villalobos

25 May 2014	Mérida	2 – 0 (3–0 agg.)	Real Ávila	Mérida
19:00 (CEST)	Toni 45'; Cristo 57'	Report		Stadium: Romano; Attendance: 7,500; Referee: Alonso Portillo

25 May 2014	San Roque de Lepe	2 – 0 (a.e.t.) (2–0 agg.)	Almansa	Lepe
19:00 (CEST)	Fran Lepe 99'; Juan Gómez 120'	Report		Stadium: Ciudad de Lepe; Attendance: 1,000; Referee: Quintero Siles

25 May 2014	Socuéllamos	2 – 1 (3–1 agg.)	Praviano	Socuéllamos
19:00 (CEST)	Jacinto 44'; Javi Bolo 70' (pen.)	Report	Morán 30'	Stadium: Paquito Jiménez; Attendance: 1,500; Referee: Andújar Raya

=== Second round ===
==== Qualified teams ====
The draw took place in the RFEF headquarters, in Las Rozas (Madrid), on 26 May 2014, 16:30 CEST.

Group	Position	Team
1	1st	Somozas
3	1st	Gimnástica
6	1st	Eldense
7	1st	Trival Valderas
10	1st	Betis B
12	1st	Atlético Granadilla
15	1st	Izarra
16	1st	Varea
18	1st	Puertollano

Group	Position	Team
2	2nd	Langreo
3	2nd	Laredo
5	2nd	Montañesa
6	2nd	Alzira
7	2nd	Rayo Vallecano B
8	2nd	Atlético Astorga
9	2nd	Linares
10	2nd	San Roque de Lepe
13	2nd	Yeclano
14	2nd	Mérida
15	2nd	San Juan
16	2nd	Haro
17	2nd	Teruel
18	2nd	Socuéllamos

Group	Position	Team
2	3rd	Ceares
4	3rd	Arenas
5	3rd	Europa
6	3rd	Orihuela
8	3rd	Arandina
9	3rd	Atlético Malagueño
11	3rd	Formentera
12	3rd	Mensajero
16	3rd	Náxara

Group	Position	Team
1	4th	Pontevedra
7	4th	SS de los Reyes
12	4th	Tenerife B
16	4th	Anguiano

==== Matches ====
Team 1	Agg.	Team 2	1st leg	2nd leg
Pontevedra	4–0	Atlético Granadilla	3–0	1–0
San Sebastián de los Reyes	3–3 (a)	Somozas	2–3	1–0
Anguiano	2–4	Betis B	1–1	1–3
Tenerife B	6–5	Varea	3–0	3–5
Orihuela	3–0	Izarra	2–0	1–0
Arandina	0–2	Eldense	0–0	0–2
Náxara	1–4	Puertollano	0–1	1–3
Arenas	4–2	Gimnástica	0–0	4–2
Ceares	2–5	Trival Valderas	0–3	2–2
Formentera	3–3 (a)	Montañesa	2–0	1–3
Europa	0–2	Socuéllamos	0–0	0–2
Atlético Malagueño	2–4	San Roque de Lepe	2–1	0–3
Mensajero	4–4 (p)	Atlético Astorga	4–0	0–4
Laredo	3–1	Teruel	2–0	1–1
San Juan	1–2	Mérida	0–1	1–1
Alzira	4–2	Yeclano	3–0	1–2
Rayo Vallecano B	0–2	Linares	0–1	0–1
Haro	1–2	Langreo	1–0	0–2

===== First leg =====
31 May 2014	Arandina	0 – 0	Eldense	Aranda de Duero
17:00 (CEST)		Report		Stadium: El Montecillo; Attendance: 2,000; Referee: Acero Pradera

31 May 2014	San Juan	0 – 1	Mérida	Pamplona
17:30 (CEST)		Report	Cristo 58' (pen.)	Stadium: San Juan; Referee: Sánchez López

31 May 2014	Anguiano	1 – 1	Betis B	Anguiano
18:00 (CEST)	Moha 3'	Report	Caro 77'	Stadium: La Isla; Attendance: 600; Referee: Hernández Cifuentes

31 May 2014	Laredo	2 – 0	Teruel	Laredo
18:00 (CEST)	Juanlu 15'; Camino 30'	Report		Stadium: San Lorenzo; Attendance: 1,000; Referee: López Abelleira

31 May 2014	Arenas	0 – 0	Gimnástica	Getxo
18:30 (CEST)		Report		Stadium: Gobela; Attendance: 1,200; Referee: Sánchez Murcia

1 June 2014	Formentera	2 – 0	Montañesa	Sant Francesc Xavier
12:00 (CEST)	Piquero 60'; Armando 89'	Report		Stadium: Municipal; Attendance: 1,000; Referee: Flores Carrasco

1 June 2014	Rayo Vallecano B	0 – 1	Linares	Madrid
12:00 (CEST)		Report	Siscu 71'	Stadium: Vallecas; Attendance: 3,000; Referee: Sevilla Lérida

1 June 2014	San Sebastián de los Reyes	2 – 3	Somozas	San Sebastián de los Reyes
12:15 (CEST)	Javi Vicente 24'; Héctor 89'	Report	Stefan 50'; Heber 56'; Antas 59'	Stadium: Nuevo Matapiñonera; Attendance: 730; Referee: Pardos Matamoros

1 June 2014	Mensajero	4 – 0	Atlético Astorga	Santa Cruz de La Palma
11:30 (WEST)	Yeray 45' (pen.); Vianney 46'; Borja 50', 67'	Report		Stadium: Silvestre Carrillo; Attendance: 2,000; Referee: Carralero Calvo

1 June 2014	Tenerife B	3 – 0	Varea	Santa Cruz de Tenerife
12:00 (WEST)	Plasencia 3', 62'; Álex 65'	Report		Stadium: Centro Insular; Attendance: 350; Referee: Garrigos Mascarell

1 June 2014	Ceares	0 – 3	Trival Valderas	Gijón
17:00 (CEST)		Report	Óscar 16', 51'; Herrero 32'	Stadium: La Cruz; Attendance: 1,500; Referee: Díaz Álvarez

1 June 2014	Náxara	0 – 1	Puertollano	Nájera
18:00 (CEST)		Report	Hugo Díaz 47'	Stadium: La Salera; Attendance: 1,000; Referee: Arriola Echevarría

1 June 2014	Europa	0 – 0	Socuéllamos	Barcelona
18:00 (CEST)		Report		Stadium: Nou Sardenya; Attendance: 3,250; Referee: De Oleza de España

1 June 2014	Orihuela	2 – 0	Izarra	Orihuela
19:00 (CEST)	Vivancos 27'; Piñera 59'	Report		Stadium: Los Arcos; Attendance: 1,500; Referee: Lax Franco

1 June 2014	Atlético Malagueño	2 – 1	San Roque de Lepe	Málaga
19:00 (CEST)	Ernesto 53', 68'	Report	Juanma 92'	Stadium: La Rosaleda; Attendance: 1,500; Referee: Calzado Aranda

1 June 2014	Haro	1 – 0	Langreo	Haro
19:00 (CEST)	Breixo 72'	Report		Stadium: El Mazo; Attendance: 1,500; Referee: Crespo Puente

1 June 2014	Alzira	3 – 0	Yeclano	Alzira
19:30 (CEST)				Stadium: Luis Suñer Picó; Referee: Montero de Lerma

1 June 2014	Pontevedra	3 – 0	Atlético Granadilla	Pontevedra
20:00 (CEST)				Stadium: Pasarón; Referee: Domínguez Zapatero

===== Second leg =====
7 June 2014	Atlético Astorga	4 – 0 (4–4 agg.) (4 – 3 p)	Mensajero	Astorga
18:00 (CEST)	Ivi Vales 31'; Antonio 35'; Borja 69'; Puente 90'	Report		Stadium: La Eragudina; Attendance: 2,000; Referee: Martínez Santos
	Penalties
	Penalty scored Penalty missed		Penalty missed Penalty scored

7 June 2014	Betis B	3 – 1 (4–2 agg.)	Anguiano	Seville
19:00 (CEST)	Eneko 54'; Ismael 73'; Álvaro González 82'	Report	Sotes 49'	Stadium: Benito Villamarín; Attendance: 8,000; Referee: Morillo Sánchez

8 June 2014	Trival Valderas	2 – 2 (5–2 agg.)	Ceares	Alcorcón
11:30 (CEST)	Palacios 45'; Óscar 94'	Report	Ponte 63'; Juan Carlos 67'	Stadium: La Canaleja; Attendance: 750; Referee: Creus Rodríguez

8 June 2014	Varea	5 – 3 (5–6 agg.)	Tenerife B	Logroño
12:00 (CEST)	Rubén Pérez 9', 80'; Aguinaga 27'; Borja 44'; Esaúl 54'	Report	Amorín 2', 77'; Santi 24'	Stadium: Municipal; Attendance: 400; Referee: Marta Frías

8 June 2014	Montañesa	3 – 1 (3–3 agg.)	Formentera	Barcelona
12:00 (CEST)	Joshua 16'; Poves 39'; Amantini 74'	Report	Mourad 88' (pen.)	Stadium: Nou Barris; Attendance: González González; Referee: 1,000

8 June 2014	Somozas	0 – 1 (3–3 agg.)	San Sebastián de los Reyes	As Somozas
18:00 (CEST)		Report	Gibanel 64'	Stadium: Pardiñas; Attendance: 1,200; Referee: Granada Barros

8 June 2014	Puertollano	3 – 1 (3–2 agg.)	Náxara	Puertollano
18:00 (CEST)	Hugo Díaz 56'; Rubén Gómez 60'; Valdivia 86'	Report	Jorge 54'	Stadium: Ciudad de Puertollano; Attendance: 2,000; Referee: Ruiz Aguilera

8 June 2014	Gimnástica	2 – 4 (2–4 agg.)	Arenas	Torrelavega
18:00 (CEST)	Miguelín 19'; Pascua 38'	Report	Infante 11'; Txopi 17', 81'; Zalo 20' (o.g.)	Stadium: El Malecón; Attendance: 1,800; Referee: Rivera Guerra

8 June 2014	Teruel	1 – 1 (1–3 agg.)	Laredo	Teruel
18:00 (CEST)	Arribas 34'	Report	Camino 45'	Stadium: Pinilla; Attendance: 1,000; Referee: Mena Gimeno

8 June 2014	Mérida	1 – 1 (2–1 agg.)	San Juan	Mérida
18:00 (CEST)	Mansilla 92'	Report	Rives 61'	Stadium: Romano; Attendance: 10,000; Referee: Salvador Sánchez

8 June 2014	Langreo	2 – 0 (2–1 agg.)	Haro	Langreo
18:00 (CEST)	Nacho Méndez 1'; Chus 69'	Report		Stadium: Ganzábal; Attendance: 1,867; Referee: Zubillaga Serrano

8 June 2014	Izarra	0 – 1 (0–3 agg.)	Orihuela	Estella-Lizarra
19:00 (CEST)		Report	Tonino 6'	Stadium: Merkatondoa; Attendance: 500; Referee: Pérez Martín

8 June 2014	Socuéllamos	2 – 0 (2–0 agg.)	Europa	Socuéllamos
19:00 (CEST)	Santi Cabeza 37'; Javi Bolo 77'	Report		Stadium: Paquito Jiménez; Attendance: 2,000; Referee: Cortes Romero

8 June 2014	Yeclano	2 – 1 (2–4 agg.)	Alzira	Yecla
19:00 (CEST)	Tonete 13'; Rafa 17'	Report	Adolfo 87'	Stadium: La Constitución; Attendance: 2,000; Referee: Montoro Garrido

8 June 2014	Linares	1 – 0 (2–0 agg.)	Rayo Vallecano B	Linares
19:00 (CEST)	Rafa Payán (pen.)	Report		Stadium: Linarejos; Attendance: 9,750; Referee: Marchante Flores

8 June 2014	Eldense	2 – 0 (2–0 agg.)	Arandina	Elda
19:30 (CEST)	José Fran 50'; Algaba 91'	Report		Stadium: Nuevo Pepico Amat; Attendance: 2,500; Referee: Cecilia Illán

8 June 2014	Atlético Granadilla	0 – 1 (0–4 agg.)	Pontevedra	Granadilla de Abona
19:00 (WEST)		Report	Miguel 11'	Stadium: Francisco Suárez; Attendance: 300; Referee: Gómez Hernández

8 June 2014	San Roque de Lepe	3 – 0 (4–2 agg.)	Atlético Malagueño	Lepe
20:00 (CEST)	Suanes 76'; Jorge Vázquez 83'; Selu 85'	Report		Stadium: Ciudad de Lepe; Attendance: 1,300; Referee: Alcaraz Yáñez

=== Third round ===
==== Qualified teams ====
The draw took place in the RFEF headquarters, in Las Rozas (Madrid), on 9 June 2014, 16:45 CEST.

Group	Position	Team
1	1st	Somozas
6	1st	Eldense
7	1st	Trival Valderas
10	1st	Betis B
18	1st	Puertollano

Group	Position	Team
2	2nd	Langreo
3	2nd	Laredo
6	2nd	Alzira
8	2nd	Atlético Astorga
9	2nd	Linares
10	2nd	San Roque de Lepe
14	2nd	Mérida
18	2nd	Socuéllamos

Group	Position	Team
4	3rd	Arenas
6	3rd	Orihuela
11	3rd	Formentera

Group	Position	Team
1	4th	Pontevedra
12	4th	Tenerife B

==== Matches ====
Team 1	Agg.	Team 2	1st leg	2nd leg
Tenerife B	2–5	Somozas	1–5	1–0
Pontevedra	0–2	Puertollano	0–2	0–0
Arenas	1–3	Trival Valderas	1–0	0−3
Formentera	1–2	Eldense	0–0	1−2
Orihuela	3–4	Betis B	2–0	1−4
San Roque de Lepe	3–2	Alzira	1–1	2–1
Mérida	0–1	Langreo	0–0	0–1
Socuéllamos	2–1	Linares	2–1	0–0
Laredo	2–2 (a)	Atlético Astorga	2–1	0–1

===== First leg =====
14 June 2014	Laredo	2 – 1	Atlético Astorga	Laredo
18:00 (CEST)	Bubu 12', 27'	Report	Antonio León 14'	Stadium: San Lorenzo; Attendance: 1,200; Referee: Pérez de Mendiola González

14 June 2014	Arenas	1 – 0	Trival Valderas	Getxo
18:30 (CEST)	Infante 39'	Report		Stadium: Gobela; Attendance: 1,200; Referee: Gallego Valdivieso

14 June 2014	San Roque de Lepe	1 – 1	Alzira	Lepe
20:00 (CEST)	Germán 36'	Report	Gimeno 6'	Stadium: Ciudad de Lepe; Attendance: 1,300; Referee: Guillermo Conejero

15 June 2014	Formentera	0 – 0	Eldense	Sant Francesc Xavier
12:00 (CEST)		Report		Stadium: Municipal; Attendance: Mancera Antón; Referee: 800

15 June 2014	Socuéllamos	2 – 1	Linares	Socuéllamos
12:15 (CEST)	Carlos García 4'; Santi Cabeza 51'	Report	Chato 55' (o.g.)	Stadium: Paquito Jiménez; Attendance: 2,000; Referee: López Fernández

15 June 2014	Tenerife B	1 – 5	Somozas	Santa Cruz de Tenerife
12:00 (WEST)	Nata 88'	Report	Antas 39', 64'; Stefan 51'; Héber Pena 62'; Luis Ángel 90'	Stadium: Centro Insular; Attendance: 500; Referee: Veloso Rivas

15 June 2014	Mérida	0 – 0	Langreo	Mérida
18:00 (CEST)		Report		Stadium: Romano; Attendance: 10,000; Referee: Rodríguez Cayetano

15 June 2014	Orihuela	2 – 0	Betis B	Orihuela
19:00 (CEST)	Del Cueto 5'; Poveda 16'	Report		Stadium: Los Arcos; Attendance: 2,500; Referee: Burillo Naranjo

15 June 2014	Pontevedra	0 – 2	Puertollano	Pontevedra
20:00 (CEST)		Report	Hugo 23'; Rubén Gómez 72'	Stadium: Pasarón; Attendance: 8,000; Referee: López Abelleira

===== Second leg =====
21 June 2014	Atlético Astorga	1 – 0 (2–2 agg.)	Laredo	Astorga
18:00 (CEST)	Lago 13'	Report		Stadium: La Eragudina; Attendance: 2,000; Referee: Sáez de Adana Oribe

21 June 2014	Eldense	2 – 1 (2–1 agg.)	Formentera	Elda
19:00 (CEST)	Tabares 35'; Cañadas 42'	Report	Urrea 47'	Stadium: Nuevo Pepico Amat; Attendance: 4,000; Referee: Ruipérez Marín

21 June 2014	Betis B	4 – 1 (4–3 agg.)	Orihuela	Seville
19:00 (CEST)	Isuardi 56'; Álvaro 58'; Juanma 75'; Caro 93'	Report	Vivanco 26'	Stadium: Benito Villamarín; Attendance: 12,000; Referee: Suárez Ramos

21 June 2014	Alzira	1 – 2 (a.e.t.) (2–3 agg.)	San Roque de Lepe	Alzira
20:00 (CEST)	Gabri 22'	Report	Selu 80' (pen.); Mustafá 120'	Stadium: Luis Suñer Picó; Attendance: 3,000; Referee: Lax Franco

22 June 2014	Trival Valderas	3 − 0 (a.e.t.) (3–1 agg.)	Arenas	Alcorcón
11:30 (CEST)	Propin 43', 103'; Palacios 115'	Report		Stadium: La Canaleja; Attendance: 3,000; Referee: Gallego Hernández

22 June 2014	Somozas	0 – 1 (5–2 agg.)	Tenerife B	As Somozas
17:00 (CEST)		Report	Jorge Sáenz 85'	Stadium: Pardiñas; Attendance: 600; Referee: Alonso Prendes

22 June 2014	Langreo	1 – 0 (1–0 agg.)	Mérida	Langreo
18:00 (CEST)	Pablo Acebal 78' (pen.)	Report		Stadium: Ganzábal; Attendance: 4,017; Referee: León Lavín

22 June 2014	Puertollano	0 – 0 (2–0 agg.)	Pontevedra	Puertollano
19:00 (CEST)		Report		Stadium: Ciudad de Puertollano; Attendance: Ruiz Aguilera; Referee: 4,000

22 June 2014	Linares	0 – 0 (1–2 agg.)	Socuéllamos	Linares
19:00 (CEST)				Stadium: Linarejos; Attendance: 10,000; Referee: Fernández Montes

Promoted to Segunda División B
Atlético Astorga (First time ever)	Betis B (One year later)	Eldense (7 years later)	Langreo (11 years later)	San Roque de Lepe (One year later)	Puertollano (2 years later)	Socuéllamos (First time ever)	Somozas (First time ever)	Trival Valderas (First time ever)

== See also ==
- 2014 Segunda División play-offs
- 2014 Segunda División B play-offs
