= Revuelta =

Revuelta is a Spanish surname. Notable people with the surname include:

- Alejandro Revuelta Montero (born 2000), Spanish football central defender
- Alina Fernández Revuelta (born 1956), Cuban anti-communist activist
- Andrea Revuelta Goicoechea (born 2006), Spanish amateur golfer
- C'el Revuelta (fl. 1986 – died 2017), bassist for American hardcore punk band Black Flag
- Inés Aleida Sánchez Guarde de Revuelta, Cuban-Costa Rican journalist
- Javier Revuelta (born 1957), Spanish equestrian
- Julio Revuelta (1959–2026), Spanish architect and politician
- Kepa Arrizabalaga Revuelta (born 1994), Spanish football goalkeeper
- María José González Revuelta, Spanish politician
- Martha Revuelta Jiménez (born 1986), Mexican beach volleyball and volleyball player
- Natalia Revuelta Clews (1925–2015), Cuban socialite
- Pilar Revuelta, Spanish production designer, art director, and set decorator
- Rodrigo Jiménez Revuelta, Spanish politician

== See also ==
- Revueltas (disambiguation)
- Lamborghini Revuelto, sports car brand
- La revuelta (TV series), Spanish talk show
- La Revuelta, 2012 album by Bersuit Vergarabat
