= 2014–15 Segunda División B =

Segunda División B
- Season: 2014–15
- Champions: Oviedo
- Promoted: Oviedo; Gimnàstic; Bilbao Athletic; Huesca
- Top goalscorer: Miguel Linares (28 goals)
- Best goalkeeper: Oinatz Aulestia (0.53 goals)
- Biggest home win: Conquense 8–1 Barakaldo (26 October 2014)
- Biggest away win: Zaragoza B 2–8 Valencia Mestalla (17 May 2015)
- Highest scoring: Zaragoza B 2–8 Valencia Mestalla (17 May 2015)
- Highest attendance: 32,100; Bilbao Athletic 2–0 Cádiz (20 June 2015)

The 2014–15 Segunda División B season was the 38th since its establishment. The first matches of the season were played on 23 August 2014, and the season ended on 21 June 2015 with the promotion play-off finals.

== Summary before the 2014–15 season ==
Playoffs de Ascenso:

- Racing de Santander (P)
- Racing de Ferrol
- Real Avilés
- CD Guijuelo
- Sestao River Club
- CD Leganés (P)
- CD Toledo
- Las Palmas Atlético
- UE Llagostera (P)
- CE L'Hospitalet
- Lleida Esportiu
- Gimnàstic
- Albacete (P)
- La Hoya Lorca
- FC Cartagena
- Cádiz CF

Relegated from Segunda División:

- Real Murcia (administrative relegation)
- Real Madrid Castilla
- Real Jaén
- Hércules CF

Promoted from Tercera División:

- CD Lealtad (from Group 2)
- SD Leioa (from Group 4)
- UE Cornellà (from Group 5)
- Real Valladolid B (from Group 8)
- Marbella FC (from Group 9)
- RCD Mallorca B (from Group 11)
- UCAM Murcia CF (from Group 13)
- CF Villanovense (from Group 14)
- Real Zaragoza B (from Group 17)
- Real Betis B (from Group 10)
- San Roque de Lepe (from Group 10)
- CD Eldense (from Group 6)
- Atlético Astorga FC (from Group 8)
- CF Trival Valderas (from Group 7)
- UD Somozas (from Group 1)
- UP Langreo (from Group 2)
- UD Socuéllamos (from Group 18)

Relegated:

- Caudal Deportivo
- SD Logroñés
- Celta de Vigo B
- SD Noja
- CD Laudio
- CD Puerta Bonita
- Peña Sport FC
- CD Sariñena
- AE Prat
- Levante UD B
- CE Constància
- Ontinyent CF
- Algeciras CF
- La Roda CF
- San Fernando CD
- Atlético Sanluqueño
- Écija Balompié

Administrative relegation:

- CD Ourense (financial trouble)
- Real Madrid C (due to the relegation of Real Madrid Castilla from Segunda División)
- CD Puertollano (resigned to promote from Group 18)

Occupied the vacant spots by administrative relegations:

- Rayo Vallecano B (occupied the vacant spot of Real Madrid C)
- Celta de Vigo B (bought the spot of CD Ourense)
- La Roda (bought the spot of CD Puertollano)

== Groups ==
=== Group 1 ===
==== Stadia and locations ====
Location of teams in 2014–15 Segunda División B Group 1

Team	Home city	Stadium	Capacity
Atlético Astorga	Astorga	La Eragudina	2,000
Avilés	Avilés	Román Suárez Puerta	5,352
Burgos	Burgos	El Plantío	14,000
Celta B ^{(R)}	Vigo	Barreiro	4,500
Compostela	Santiago	San Lázaro	14,000
Coruxo	Coruxo, Vigo	O Vao	1,200
Cultural Leonesa	León	Reino de León	13,451
Guijuelo	Guijuelo	Estadio Municipal	1,500
Langreo	Langreo	Ganzábal	4,024
Lealtad	Villaviciosa	Les Caleyes	2,000
Marino de Luanco	Luanco	Miramar	3,500
Murcia	Murcia	Nueva Condomina	31,179
Oviedo	Oviedo	Carlos Tartiere	30,500
Racing Ferrol	Ferrol	A Malata	12,042
Somozas	As Somozas	Pardiñas	1,000
Sporting B ^{(R)}	Gijón	Pepe Ortiz	3,000
Tropezón	Tanos	Santa Ana	1,500
UD Logroñés	Logroño	Las Gaunas	16,000
Valladolid B ^{(R)}	Valladolid	Anexos José Zorrilla	1,500
Zamora	Zamora	Ruta de la Plata	8,000

==== League table ====
Pos	Team	Pld	W	D	L	GF	GA	GD	Pts	Qualification or relegation
1	Oviedo (P)	38	24	8	6	77	31	+46	80	Qualification to group champions' playoffs
2	Murcia	38	22	6	10	47	26	+21	72	Qualification to promotion playoffs
3	Racing Ferrol	38	20	9	9	65	41	+24	69	Qualification to promotion playoffs
4	UD Logroñés	38	19	9	10	49	37	+12	66	Qualification to promotion playoffs
5	Guijuelo	38	17	10	11	58	48	+10	61	Qualification to Copa del Rey
6	Compostela	38	17	10	11	45	39	+6	61	Qualification to Copa del Rey
7	Cultural Leonesa	38	15	14	9	52	43	+9	59	Qualification to Copa del Rey
8	Coruxo	38	13	14	11	44	47	−3	53	
9	Valladolid B	38	14	10	14	54	54	0	52	
10	Somozas	38	14	10	14	44	43	+1	52	
11	Sporting Gijón B	38	13	11	14	49	50	−1	50	
12	Burgos	38	13	10	15	37	40	−3	49	
13	Celta Vigo B	38	14	6	18	49	58	−9	48	
14	Atlético Astorga	38	10	15	13	50	56	−6	45	
15	Lealtad	38	11	11	16	38	49	−11	44	
16	Avilés (R)	38	12	7	19	36	53	−17	43	Qualification to relegation playoffs
17	Langreo (R)	38	11	10	17	37	49	−12	43	Relegation to Tercera División
18	Zamora (R)	38	11	6	21	38	51	−13	39	Relegation to Tercera División
19	Tropezón (R)	38	9	9	20	38	62	−24	36	Relegation to Tercera División
20	Marino Luanco (R)	38	4	9	25	26	56	−30	21	Relegation to Tercera División

Updated to match(es) played on 28 June 2015. Source: Futbolme.com
Rules for classification: 1) points; 2) head-to-head points; 3) head-to-head goal difference; 4) head-to-head goals scored; 5) goal difference; 6) number of goals scored
(P) Promoted; (R) Relegated

==== Top goalscorers ====
Last updated 17 May 2015

Goalscorers	Goals	Team
(Spain) Miguel Linares	28	Oviedo
(Spain) Isaac Aketxe	20	Cultural Leonesa
(Spain) Borja Iglesias	17	Celta de Vigo B
(Spain) Joselu	15	Racing de Ferrol
(Spain) Marc Nierga	14	Guijuelo

==== Top goalkeepers ====
Last updated 17 May 2015

Goalkeeper	Goals	Matches	Average	Team
(Spain) Esteban Andrés	31	38	0.82	Oviedo
(Spain) Miguel Martínez	36	37	0.97	UD Logroñés
(Spain) Adrián Torre	31	30	1.03	Langreo
(Spain) Ian Mackay	38	36	1.06	Racing de Ferrol
(Spain) Leandro Montagud	33	30	1.1	Cultural Leonesa

==== Results ====
Home \ Away	AST	AVI	BUR	CEL	COM	COR	CLE	GUJ	LAN	LEA	MAR	MUR	ROV	RFE	SOM	SPG	TRO	UDL	VAD	ZAM
Atlético Astorga	—	2–3	0–0	0–0	4–1	3–1	2–2	2–1	1–2	6–2	2–2	0–2	0–1	2–2	0–2	1–1	3–0	1–0	2–1	0–4
Avilés	3–1	—	2–1	2–1	0–1	0–1	0–0	1–1	2–1	1–0	2–1	1–0	0–0	1–3	0–1	1–1	1–3	0–1	1–1	3–1
Burgos	0–1	3–0	—	2–0	2–0	2–3	1–3	0–2	1–0	0–0	2–1	0–2	0–2	1–2	1–0	3–2	0–0	1–2	3–0	2–1
Celta Vigo B	0–2	2–0	1–1	—	0–1	3–0	2–1	2–2	5–0	1–1	2–0	0–2	1–4	2–3	0–0	0–3	1–2	4–2	2–0	4–1
Compostela	2–0	3–1	2–0	1–2	—	1–1	0–2	0–1	2–0	2–1	2–0	1–1	1–1	0–3	1–0	1–0	4–2	0–1	2–1	4–1
Coruxo	1–1	2–0	1–1	0–2	0–0	—	1–1	1–1	2–1	2–1	1–1	0–1	3–2	1–1	0–0	2–2	3–2	0–1	2–1	0–3
Cultural Leonesa	0–1	2–0	0–0	2–0	1–0	1–1	—	1–2	4–1	2–2	1–0	1–0	1–3	2–1	2–2	4–0	1–1	1–1	3–2	1–0
Guijuelo	4–0	3–1	0–0	2–0	0–1	3–2	4–0	—	3–0	1–2	1–0	2–0	1–5	3–1	2–0	1–1	2–1	1–1	1–1	1–0
Langreo	1–1	1–1	1–1	1–0	1–1	2–1	0–1	3–2	—	0–1	1–0	0–2	2–1	0–0	1–1	0–1	0–1	1–0	1–1	1–0
Lealtad	1–1	1–0	1–2	0–2	3–2	1–1	1–1	1–1	3–1	—	1–0	0–2	0–1	1–0	2–2	1–0	1–2	1–0	3–0	1–0
Marino de Luanco	2–2	0–0	1–2	2–2	0–1	1–0	3–0	1–2	1–4	1–1	—	0–1	0–3	1–1	1–0	1–2	1–0	0–1	0–3	0–0
Murcia	1–0	3–0	1–1	0–1	1–1	0–1	0–0	1–1	2–1	1–0	2–1	—	0–0	1–0	2–1	2–1	3–0	0–1	2–1	2–0
Oviedo	2–0	1–0	3–1	5–1	1–0	2–0	1–1	4–0	0–0	4–0	2–0	4–1	—	0–0	2–1	3–1	1–2	1–0	4–1	0–1
Racing Ferrol	4–2	2–1	3–1	4–0	0–0	2–0	3–2	2–1	1–0	2–1	3–2	1–2	4–1	—	1–2	3–1	3–0	1–0	4–3	1–2
Somozas	2–1	1–0	1–0	2–1	0–0	0–1	0–3	2–0	0–2	1–1	2–0	2–1	2–3	0–0	—	5–3	1–1	0–1	1–2	1–0
Sporting Gijón B	2–2	1–3	0–0	5–0	3–0	1–3	3–3	1–0	1–1	1–0	2–0	1–0	0–0	2–1	2–3	—	1–0	1–0	0–0	2–0
Tropezón	1–1	1–2	0–1	3–1	0–0	1–3	1–1	3–0	0–3	1–1	1–0	1–4	0–2	1–2	0–2	0–0	—	3–1	0–1	1–2
UD Logroñés	0–0	1–0	1–0	1–2	3–3	0–1	2–0	2–2	1–1	2–1	1–0	1–0	1–1	2–1	3–2	2–0	4–1	—	2–2	3–1
Valladolid B	3–3	1–2	0–1	1–0	2–3	2–2	2–0	3–1	3–2	1–0	1–0	0–1	4–3	0–0	1–0	1–0	2–2	1–1	—	4–0
Zamora	0–0	4–1	1–0	0–2	0–1	0–0	0–1	2–3	1–0	2–0	2–2	0–1	1–4	0–0	2–2	2–0	3–0	1–2	0–1	—

Legend: Blue = home team win; Yellow = draw; Red = away team win.

=== Group 2 ===
==== Stadia and locations ====
Location of teams in 2014–15 Segunda División B Group 2
Canary Islands

Team	Home city	Stadium	Capacity
Amorebieta	cAmorebieta-Etxano	Urritxe	3,000
Athletic B ^{(R)}	Bilbao	Lezama	2,000
Atlético B ^{(R)}	Madrid	Cerro del Espino	3,367
Barakaldo	Barakaldo	Lasesarre	8,000
Conquense	Cuenca	La Fuensanta	6,700
Fuenlabrada	Fuenlabrada	Fernando Torres	2,500
Getafe B ^{(R)}	Getafe	Ciudad Deportiva	1,500
Guadalajara	Guadalajara	Pedro Escartín	6,000
Huesca	Huesca	El Alcoraz	5,000
Las Palmas Atlético ^{(R)}	Las Palmas	Anexo del Gran Canaria	500
Leioa	Leioa	Sarriena	3,500
Rayo Vallecano B ^{(R)}	Madrid	Ciudad Deportiva	3,000
Real Madrid Castilla ^{(R)}	Madrid	Alfredo di Stéfano	6,000
Real Sociedad B ^{(R)}	San Sebastián	Zubieta	2,500
Real Unión	Irún	Stadium Gal	5,000
Sestao River	Sestao	Las Llanas	8,000
Socuéllamos	Socuéllamos	Paquito Jiménez	2,000
Toledo	Toledo	Salto del Caballo	5,300
Trival Valderas	Valderas, Alcorcón	La Canaleja	2,000
Tudelano	Tudela	Ciudad de Tudela	9,500

==== League table ====
Pos	Team	Pld	W	D	L	GF	GA	GD	Pts	Qualification or relegation
1	Huesca (P)	38	20	9	9	61	30	+31	69	Qualification to group champions' playoffs
2	Bilbao Athletic (P)	38	18	12	8	65	30	+35	66	Qualification to promotion playoffs and Ineligible for the Copa del Rey
3	Guadalajara	38	16	13	9	49	43	+6	61	Qualification to promotion playoffs
4	Real Unión	38	17	9	12	48	38	+10	60	Qualification to promotion playoffs
5	Tudelano	38	16	10	12	42	31	+11	58	Qualification to Copa del Rey
6	Real Madrid Castilla	38	16	10	12	59	40	+19	58	Inelgible for the Copa del Rey
7	Barakaldo	38	16	10	12	50	43	+7	58	Qualification to Copa del Rey
8	Socuéllamos	38	17	7	14	45	45	0	58	
9	Toledo	38	16	9	13	47	54	−7	57	
10	Amorebieta	38	14	10	14	59	54	+5	52	
11	Getafe B	38	14	9	15	50	51	−1	51	
12	Fuenlabrada	38	14	9	15	43	54	−11	51	
13	Sestao River	38	13	11	14	46	51	−5	50	
14	Real Sociedad B	38	12	12	14	51	56	−5	48	
15	Leioa	38	14	6	18	42	60	−18	48	
16	Las Palmas Atlético (R)	38	13	8	17	58	60	−2	47	Qualification to relegation playoffs
17	Rayo Vallecano B (R)	38	10	13	15	43	60	−17	43	Relegation to Tercera División
18	Atlético Madrid B (R)	38	12	5	21	52	62	−10	41	Relegation to Tercera División
19	Trival Valderas (R)	38	8	13	17	42	71	−29	37	Relegation to Tercera División
20	Conquense (R)	38	7	9	22	48	67	−19	30	Relegation to Tercera División

Updated to match(es) played on 28 June 2015. Source: Futbolme.com
Rules for classification: 1) points; 2) head-to-head points; 3) head-to-head goal difference; 4) head-to-head goals scored; 5) goal difference; 6) number of goals scored
(P) Promoted; (R) Relegated

==== Top goalscorers ====
Last updated 17 May 2015

Goalscorers	Goals	Team
(Spain) Rufino Segovia	18	Toledo
(Spain) Sabin Merino	17	Bilbao Athletic
(Spain) Jorge Galán	17	Real Unión
(Spain) Dani Aquino	17	Atlético Madrid B
(Spain) Jito Silvestre	16	Sestao River

==== Top goalkeepers ====
Last updated 17 May 2015

Goalkeeper	Goals	Matches	Average	Team
(Spain) Dani Jiménez	30	37	0.81	Huesca
(Spain) Mikel Pagola	31	38	0.82	Tudelano
(Spain) Rubén Yáñez	30	30	1	Real Madrid Castilla
(Uruguay) Pato Guillén	39	33	1.18	Barakaldo
(Spain) Javier Olmedo	39	32	1.22	Getafe B

==== Results ====
Home \ Away	AMO	AtmB	BAR	BAT	CQS	FUE	GetB	GUA	HUE	LPA	LEI	RVB	RMC	RSO	RUN	SES	SOC	TOL	TVA	TUD
Amorebieta	—	3–2	0–0	1–1	1–0	6–1	2–0	1–1	2–1	3–2	2–1	1–1	1–1	2–3	0–1	3–1	3–1	6–1	1–2	2–2
Atlético de Madrid B	3–0	—	1–0	0–3	2–1	2–3	1–2	2–2	0–1	0–1	1–1	3–0	2–1	3–0	2–0	0–1	1–2	1–2	1–2	1–0
Barakaldo	1–1	2–1	—	1–0	1–1	0–2	2–2	1–0	1–0	1–1	4–2	5–0	0–1	1–1	0–3	1–0	3–1	2–0	3–0	0–0
Bilbao Athletic	4–0	6–1	1–1	—	2–0	2–2	3–0	2–0	0–0	3–0	5–1	1–0	1–0	3–2	1–2	1–2	2–1	5–0	4–1	1–0
Conquense	1–0	0–1	8–1	1–0	—	1–2	0–2	3–4	0–0	2–4	0–1	3–5	0–2	3–3	3–1	1–0	0–1	0–1	0–1	1–1
Fuenlabrada	3–0	1–1	1–1	1–0	1–1	—	4–2	1–3	0–3	1–4	1–0	0–1	1–0	2–0	1–0	3–0	2–1	2–0	2–2	0–1
Getafe B	0–1	3–1	1–0	0–0	2–2	3–0	—	1–0	0–3	4–3	1–2	2–0	0–1	0–1	1–0	1–1	2–2	1–1	2–1	0–1
Guadalajara	2–1	2–1	0–4	0–0	1–0	2–1	1–1	—	3–1	3–1	2–2	1–1	0–0	1–0	0–0	2–1	2–1	0–1	3–1	1–0
Huesca	0–0	3–2	2–1	2–2	3–1	0–0	2–0	0–0	—	4–0	4–1	2–0	2–0	1–0	2–1	0–0	2–0	3–0	6–1	1–0
Las Palmas Atlético	2–1	1–0	2–3	3–3	0–1	2–0	3–2	0–2	1–2	—	2–0	0–0	2–2	0–0	0–1	4–2	0–1	0–1	3–0	3–0
Leioa	3–2	1–3	0–1	0–1	1–0	2–1	1–2	2–1	0–2	0–0	—	5–4	1–0	0–2	1–0	0–3	2–0	2–4	2–0	0–2
Rayo Vallecano B	2–2	2–2	1–0	2–1	2–1	0–0	1–4	0–2	1–2	1–1	1–2	—	2–1	1–1	2–0	1–1	1–0	1–1	1–1	1–4
Real Madrid Castilla	0–3	4–2	4–0	2–2	2–1	3–0	1–2	1–1	1–0	5–1	4–1	4–1	—	3–1	0–1	2–2	0–2	4–1	3–1	1–1
Real Sociedad B	1–0	1–2	0–2	1–1	3–3	3–0	3–2	4–0	3–2	0–3	1–1	0–1	1–0	—	3–0	1–1	1–2	1–1	3–1	2–1
Real Unión	2–0	2–0	1–0	1–1	4–0	1–2	0–0	2–1	1–1	1–2	1–0	3–2	3–2	4–0	—	2–2	1–0	1–0	1–1	0–1
Sestao River	0–2	2–1	1–1	0–2	2–2	2–0	1–0	2–1	2–1	3–2	1–2	0–2	0–2	3–2	2–2	—	1–0	0–0	3–1	2–1
Socuéllamos	1–0	3–2	0–3	1–0	2–1	1–1	1–1	2–2	3–2	2–1	1–0	1–0	0–0	1–1	1–0	1–1	—	4–0	2–0	0–2
Toledo	3–1	2–0	3–2	0–1	2–3	2–0	2–1	1–1	1–0	2–1	0–0	1–0	0–1	1–1	2–2	1–0	1–2	—	4–2	1–1
Trival Valderas	2–3	1–1	0–1	0–0	2–2	2–1	3–2	0–1	1–1	3–3	1–1	2–2	0–0	1–1	2–2	1–0	1–0	1–4	—	1–0
Tudelano	2–2	1–3	1–0	1–0	4–1	0–0	0–1	1–1	1–0	1–0	0–1	0–0	1–1	3–0	0–1	2–1	3–1	1–0	2–0	—

Legend: Blue = home team win; Yellow = draw; Red = away team win.

=== Group 3 ===
==== Stadia and locations ====
Location of teams in 2014-15 Segunda División B – Group 3

Team	Home city	Stadium	Capacity
Alcoyano	Alcoy	El Collao	4,880
Atlético Baleares	Palma de Mallorca	Son Malferit	1,000
Badalona	Badalona	Montigalà	1,500
Cornellà	Cornellà	Nou Camp	1,500
Elche Ilicitano ^{(R)}	Elche	José Díez Iborra	1,500
Eldense	Elda	Nuevo Pepico Amat	4,036
Espanyol B ^{(R)}	Sant Adrià de Besòs	Ciutat Esportiva Dani Jarque	6,000
Gimnàstic	Tarragona	Nou Estadi	14,500
Hércules	Alicante	Rico Pérez	30,000
Huracán Valencia	Torrent	San Gregorio	3,500
L'Hospitalet	L'Hospitalet de Llobregat	Feixa Llarga	6,740
Lleida Esportiu	Lleida	Camp d'Esports	13,000
RCD Mallorca B ^{(R)}	Palma de Mallorca	Son Bibiloni	1,900
Olímpic de Xàtiva	Xàtiva	La Murta	3,600
Olot	Olot	Municipal d'Olot	2,000
Reus	Reus	Municipal	4,700
Sant Andreu	Barcelona	Narcís Sala	6,550
Valencia Mestalla ^{(R)}	Valencia	Antonio Puchades Stadium	3,000
Villarreal B ^{(R)}	Villarreal	Ciudad Deportiva	5,000
Zaragoza B ^{(R)}	Zaragoza	Ciudad Deportiva	2,500

==== League table ====
Pos	Team	Pld	W	D	L	GF	GA	GD	Pts	Qualification or relegation
1	Gimnàstic (P)	38	21	10	7	51	30	+21	73	Qualification to group champions' playoffs
2	Huracán Valencia	38	17	14	7	46	30	+16	65	Qualification to promotion playoffs
3	Reus	38	19	6	13	44	33	+11	63	Qualification to promotion playoffs
4	Hércules	38	18	9	11	41	29	+12	63	Qualification to promotion playoffs
5	Lleida Esportiu	38	18	7	13	45	34	+11	61	Qualification to Copa del Rey
6	Alcoyano	38	16	11	11	37	40	−3	59	
7	Badalona	38	15	11	12	37	37	0	56	
8	Olímpic	38	16	7	15	38	37	+1	55	
9	L'Hospitalet	38	15	9	14	41	36	+5	54	
10	Villarreal B	38	14	11	13	51	45	+6	53	
11	Espanyol B	38	14	11	13	50	42	+8	53	
12	Atlético Baleares	38	13	10	15	48	45	+3	49	
13	Olot	38	12	12	14	37	38	−1	48	
14	Valencia Mestalla	38	13	9	16	43	41	+2	48	
15	Cornellà	38	11	12	15	41	50	−9	45	
16	Eldense (O)	38	12	9	17	45	49	−4	45	Qualification to relegation playoffs
17	Mallorca B (R)	38	11	11	16	40	58	−18	44	Relegation to Tercera División
18	Sant Andreu (R)	38	10	9	19	37	48	−11	39	Relegation to Tercera División
19	Elche Ilicitano (R)	38	8	11	19	38	60	−22	35	Relegation to Tercera División
20	Zaragoza B (R)	38	9	7	22	39	67	−28	34	Relegation to Tercera División

Updated to match(es) played on 28 June 2015. Source: Futbolme.com
Rules for classification: 1) points; 2) head-to-head points; 3) head-to-head goal difference; 4) head-to-head goals scored; 5) goal difference; 6) number of goals scored
(O) Play-off winners; (P) Promoted; (R) Relegated

==== Top goalscorers ====
Last updated 17 May 2015

Goalscorers	Goals	Team
(Nigeria) Cedric Omoigui	17	Mallorca B
(Spain) Jairo Morillas	17	Espanyol B
(Spain) Sergi Guardiola	14	Eldense
(Spain) Salva Chamorro	14	Lleida Esportiu
(Spain) Rayco García	14	Gimnàstic

==== Top goalkeepers ====
Last updated 17 May 2015

Goalkeeper	Goals	Matches	Average	Team
(Spain) Manolo Reina	23	35	0.66	Gimnàstic
(Spain) Chema Jiménez	29	37	0.78	Hércules
(Spain) Paco Fernández	30	38	0.79	Huracán Valencia
(Spain) Pau Torres	31	37	0.84	Lleida Esportiu
(Spain) Edgar Badia	33	38	0.87	Reus

==== Results ====
Home \ Away	ALY	BAL	BAD	COR	ElcB	ELD	ESP	GIM	HÉR	HUR	HOS	LLE	MLL	XAT	OLO	REU	SAN	VMS	VIL	ZarB
Alcoyano	—	1–1	1–0	1–0	1–0	0–0	1–1	1–0	1–0	0–0	0–0	3–2	2–1	0–0	1–0	1–0	1–2	2–1	0–3	1–1
Atlético Baleares	1–2	—	1–0	6–2	4–1	0–0	1–1	0–1	0–3	1–2	0–0	1–0	2–0	0–0	2–0	1–0	3–0	0–1	0–2	0–0
Badalona	0–0	3–2	—	1–1	1–0	2–0	2–0	0–1	2–0	0–0	1–0	1–1	0–0	1–0	0–4	1–2	1–0	0–0	2–1	1–0
Cornellà	0–1	1–2	1–1	—	2–1	1–1	1–3	2–2	1–2	0–1	2–0	1–0	3–0	3–1	0–0	2–0	0–0	1–0	0–0	2–1
Elche Ilicitano	2–1	2–2	1–1	1–1	—	1–2	2–1	0–2	0–2	0–2	2–1	2–0	0–0	1–2	0–0	2–1	3–1	0–0	2–4	2–1
Eldense	3–1	1–0	3–0	0–1	0–0	—	2–0	3–2	2–1	0–1	5–1	1–1	3–0	0–1	0–1	0–1	1–1	1–0	1–3	3–0
Espanyol B	1–2	4–2	3–0	3–2	0–0	1–1	—	2–0	1–0	1–1	3–2	2–2	2–1	1–0	2–3	4–1	0–0	1–0	1–3	5–0
Gimnàstic	1–0	1–1	1–1	0–0	1–1	2–0	1–0	—	0–0	2–1	0–0	1–0	3–0	2–0	1–0	1–0	0–1	3–1	3–2	2–2
Hércules	0–2	3–0	0–0	2–1	2–1	1–1	0–0	0–2	—	1–1	2–1	2–0	1–1	0–1	2–0	1–1	2–0	1–2	0–0	1–0
Huracán Valencia	4–1	3–2	2–1	2–0	1–1	2–0	0–0	2–0	1–0	—	1–1	0–2	1–1	1–3	1–0	1–0	1–1	2–2	4–0	2–1
L'Hospitalet	3–0	0–1	1–0	2–0	3–0	2–0	0–1	0–1	1–2	2–0	—	0–1	1–1	1–0	1–1	3–0	1–0	2–1	2–0	2–2
Lleida Esportiu	2–0	0–3	0–2	5–1	2–1	4–0	2–1	1–0	0–1	1–0	0–0	—	3–0	1–0	0–2	2–1	3–2	3–1	2–0	1–0
Mallorca B	1–0	1–2	3–4	3–2	2–5	3–2	3–2	1–1	1–1	0–1	0–1	1–0	—	1–0	1–1	0–3	3–2	2–1	1–0	1–0
Olímpic de Xàtiva	1–1	1–0	0–1	1–1	1–0	1–2	1–0	4–1	0–1	1–1	2–1	0–2	1–0	—	3–1	1–1	2–1	2–1	2–2	1–0
Olot	0–0	2–2	3–3	0–0	1–0	2–1	0–1	1–2	0–2	0–0	0–1	2–0	1–0	0–2	—	1–0	1–0	0–0	1–1	2–1
Reus	5–2	1–0	1–0	2–0	4–1	1–1	1–0	0–2	2–1	2–0	1–0	0–0	1–0	2–0	1–0	—	2–0	0–1	2–2	2–0
Sant Andreu	2–3	1–2	0–2	1–2	3–0	4–3	0–0	0–1	2–1	0–2	1–1	0–1	0–0	2–1	1–2	0–1	—	1–0	2–0	3–1
Valencia Mestalla	0–2	1–1	2–0	2–1	1–0	1–0	2–2	1–2	0–1	1–1	4–1	0–0	1–0	0–1	1–3	0–1	1–1	—	1–0	1–0
Villarreal B	0–0	1–0	1–2	0–0	4–0	4–1	2–0	2–2	0–1	2–1	1–2	1–0	2–2	2–0	1–0	1–1	0–0	1–3	—	1–4
Zaragoza B	2–1	3–2	1–0	2–3	3–3	2–1	1–0	0–3	0–1	0–0	0–1	1–1	2–4	2–0	3–2	1–0	0–2	2–8	0–2	—

Legend: Blue = home team win; Yellow = draw; Red = away team win.

=== Group 4 ===
==== Stadia and location ====
Location of teams in 2014-15 Segunda División B

Team	Home city	Stadium	Capacity
Almería B ^{(R)}	Almería	Juan Rojas	13,468
Arroyo	Arroyo de la Luz	Municipal	3,000
Betis B ^{(R)}	Seville	Ciudad Deportiva Luis Del Sol	4,000
Cacereño	Cáceres	Príncipe Felipe	7,000
Cádiz	Cádiz	Ramón de Carranza	20,000
Cartagena	Cartagena	Cartagonova	15,000
Córdoba B ^{(R)}	Córdoba	Ciudad Deportiva Rafael Gómez	3,000
El Palo	Málaga	San Ignacio	1,000
Granada B ^{(R)}	Granada	Miguel Prieto	2,500
Jaén	Jaén	La Victoria	12,800
La Hoya Lorca	Lorca	Francisco Artés Carrasco	8,000
La Roda	La Roda	Estadio Municipal	3,000
Linense	La Línea de la Concepción	Municipal de La Línea	12,000
Lucena	Lucena	Ciudad de Lucena	6,000
Marbella	Marbella	Estadio Municipal	7,300
Melilla	Melilla	Álvarez Claro	12,000
San Roque de Lepe	Lepe	Ciudad de Lepe	3,500
Sevilla Atlético ^{(R)}	Seville	Ciudad Deportiva José Ramón Cisneros Palacios	7,500
UCAM Murcia	Murcia	La Condomina	16,000
Villanovense	Villanueva de la Serena	Romero Cuerda	6,000

==== League table ====
Pos	Team	Pld	W	D	L	GF	GA	GD	Pts	Qualification or relegation
1	Cádiz	38	22	10	6	66	24	+42	76	Qualification to group champions' playoffs
2	UCAM Murcia	38	17	14	7	46	29	+17	65	Qualification to promotion playoffs
3	Almería B	38	17	11	10	47	30	+17	62	Qualification to promotion playoffs and Ineligible for the Copa del Rey
4	Villanovense	38	16	13	9	46	30	+16	61	Qualification to promotion playoffs
5	Granada B	38	15	13	10	50	39	+11	58	Ineligible for the Copa del Rey
6	Linense	38	16	10	12	56	52	+4	58	Qualification to Copa del Rey
7	Melilla	38	13	15	10	47	47	0	54	Qualification to Copa del Rey
8	Betis B	38	15	7	16	43	43	0	52	
9	San Roque de Lepe	38	15	6	17	52	56	−4	51	
10	Marbella	38	13	12	13	42	48	−6	51	
11	Jaén	38	11	16	11	45	36	+9	49	
12	Cacereño	38	14	5	19	49	52	−3	47	
13	La Hoya Lorca	38	12	9	17	42	44	−2	45	
14	Sevilla Atlético	38	10	14	14	33	34	−1	44	
15	La Roda	38	10	13	15	33	43	−10	43	
16	Cartagena (O)	38	9	16	13	36	46	−10	43	Qualification to relegation playoffs
17	Córdoba B (R)	38	12	7	19	33	60	−27	43	Relegation to Tercera División
18	Arroyo (R)	38	10	13	15	30	50	−20	43	Relegation to Tercera División
19	El Palo (R)	38	8	17	13	42	43	−1	41	Relegation to Tercera División
20	Lucena (R)	38	10	9	19	32	64	−32	39	Relegation to Tercera División

Updated to match(es) played on 28 June 2015. Source: Futbolme.com
Rules for classification: 1) points; 2) head-to-head points; 3) head-to-head goal difference; 4) head-to-head goals scored; 5) goal difference; 6) number of goals scored
(O) Play-off winners; (R) Relegated

==== Top goalscorers ====
Last updated 17 May 2015

Goalscorers	Goals	Team
(Honduras) Jona Mejía	18	Cádiz
(Spain) Dani Romera	15	Almería B
(Spain) Copi	15	Linense
(Spain) Alex Alegría	14	Betis B
(Spain) Juan Muñoz	14	Sevilla Atlético

==== Top goalkeepers ====
Last updated 17 May 2015

Goalkeeper	Goals	Matches	Average	Team
(Spain) Oinatz Aulestia	19	36	0.53	Cádiz
(Argentina) Gianfranco Gazzaniga	26	35	0.74	Almería B
(Spain) Miguel Escalona	24	32	0.75	UCAM Murcia
(Spain) David Soria	30	34	0.88	Sevilla Atlético
(North Macedonia) Stole Dimitrievski	36	36	1	Granada B

==== Results ====
Home \ Away	AlmB	ARR	RBB	CAC	CÁD	CAR	CÓR	PAL	GRA	JAÉ	HOY	ROD	LIN	LUC	MAR	MEL	SRO	SAT	UCM	VNV
Almería B	—	2–1	1–1	3–0	1–1	2–0	1–0	1–1	2–1	1–0	1–1	2–0	4–0	6–0	0–0	1–1	2–0	2–0	0–0	0–0
Arroyo	1–0	—	2–1	1–0	3–0	0–2	1–1	0–0	1–0	1–2	2–0	0–0	1–1	2–1	2–0	0–1	0–1	1–0	0–0	1–1
Betis B	0–1	1–0	—	2–1	0–2	2–0	0–1	3–1	1–1	0–2	0–1	3–1	1–2	6–0	1–4	3–1	0–2	1–0	0–2	3–1
Cacereño	1–2	3–0	1–3	—	0–3	1–3	4–0	2–0	2–0	1–0	1–0	2–0	1–2	6–0	0–2	3–0	2–0	3–0	1–0	2–1
Cádiz	3–0	4–0	2–0	2–1	—	2–0	3–0	1–1	1–1	1–0	2–0	0–0	2–2	3–0	5–0	2–0	4–0	0–2	1–0	2–0
Cartagena	0–0	1–2	0–2	1–1	1–3	—	1–1	2–1	3–0	1–1	0–1	1–1	2–1	1–0	1–1	2–2	1–0	0–0	0–0	0–0
Córdoba B	1–2	1–0	1–2	2–1	0–2	0–1	—	1–1	1–0	2–1	2–1	1–1	0–1	1–0	1–2	0–1	0–2	1–1	1–0	0–2
El Palo	2–1	0–0	0–0	4–1	0–0	1–1	1–2	—	0–1	1–1	1–1	2–1	5–0	0–1	0–1	1–2	4–0	0–0	3–2	1–1
Granada B	2–0	1–1	2–0	2–0	0–1	1–1	5–2	2–1	—	0–0	0–2	4–0	3–3	2–1	2–1	1–1	2–0	0–1	1–1	1–0
Jaén	0–1	5–0	1–1	4–0	1–1	1–2	0–0	0–0	3–1	—	1–1	1–1	0–0	3–1	0–0	3–2	3–2	3–1	1–2	0–3
La Hoya Lorca	1–3	6–1	1–2	4–1	2–2	2–0	0–2	3–0	0–1	1–2	—	1–0	2–1	0–1	1–0	0–0	1–3	1–1	0–0	1–1
La Roda	1–0	2–2	0–1	1–0	0–2	2–0	1–1	0–0	0–0	1–0	0–1	—	1–1	2–0	3–1	3–2	1–1	1–0	0–1	0–1
Linense	2–1	3–0	0–0	2–1	2–1	2–1	5–0	3–4	0–0	1–2	3–2	3–0	—	2–0	1–0	3–2	3–0	1–0	0–0	1–1
Lucena	0–1	0–0	0–0	3–1	2–1	0–0	2–3	0–0	2–2	0–0	1–0	2–1	1–0	—	2–5	2–1	2–1	1–0	0–0	1–1
Marbella	0–0	2–1	2–1	2–2	1–1	2–2	1–0	0–0	0–1	1–1	1–0	1–0	1–0	3–2	—	2–2	0–2	1–1	1–3	0–1
Melilla	2–1	0–0	0–0	1–1	1–1	3–2	1–3	1–1	2–1	1–1	1–1	1–1	5–1	2–1	1–0	—	2–1	0–0	0–0	1–0
San Roque de Lepe	3–2	4–0	1–2	0–1	0–2	2–2	3–1	1–2	2–2	2–1	3–0	0–0	2–1	2–1	2–3	2–1	—	1–0	0–0	2–0
Sevilla Atlético	2–0	1–1	1–0	0–0	1–3	2–0	4–0	1–0	2–2	0–0	1–0	1–2	2–2	1–1	3–0	0–1	3–1	—	1–1	0–0
UCAM Murcia	2–0	2–2	2–0	1–1	1–0	3–0	3–0	2–0	1–4	1–0	3–2	2–4	1–0	2–1	2–0	1–2	2–2	1–0	—	1–0
Villanovense	0–0	1–0	3–0	1–0	1–0	1–1	3–0	4–3	0–1	1–1	0–1	2–1	3–1	3–0	1–1	2–0	3–2	2–0	1–1	—

Legend: Blue = home team win; Yellow = draw; Red = away team win.

== See also ==
- 2014–15 La Liga
- 2014–15 Segunda División
- 2015 Segunda División B play-offs
- 2014–15 Tercera División
- 2014–15 Copa del Rey
