= CD Praviano =

Association football club in Spain

Coordinates: 43.494941°N 6.116544°W

Praviano
- Full name: Club Deportivo Praviano
- Founded: 1949
- Ground: Santa Catalina, Pravia, Asturias, Spain
- Capacity: 2,000
- Chairman: Juan José Escudero Fernández
- Manager: Luis “Lucho” Varela
- League: Tercera Federación – Group 2
- 2025–26: Tercera Federación – Group 2, 9th of 18
- Website: https://cdpravianoblog.wordpress.com/
Home colours	Away colours

Club Deportivo Praviano is a football team based in Pravia in the autonomous community of Asturias in Spain. Founded in 1949, the team plays in Tercera Federación – Group 2. The club's home ground is Santa Catalina, which has a capacity of 2,000 spectators.

== History ==
The best success of the club was in the 1965–66 season, when it got champion of the Asturian Group of Tercera División and played the promotion playoffs to Segunda División. It failed in the first round to Club Ferrol by 5–0 and 1–3.

In 2014, Praviano qualified for the promotion play-offs to Segunda División B but was eliminated in the first round by UD Socuéllamos.

In June 2019, the club signed a collaboration agreement with Real Oviedo, thus becoming their second reserve team. The terms of the agreement changed since 2020 and it is only an affiliated team.

== Season to season ==
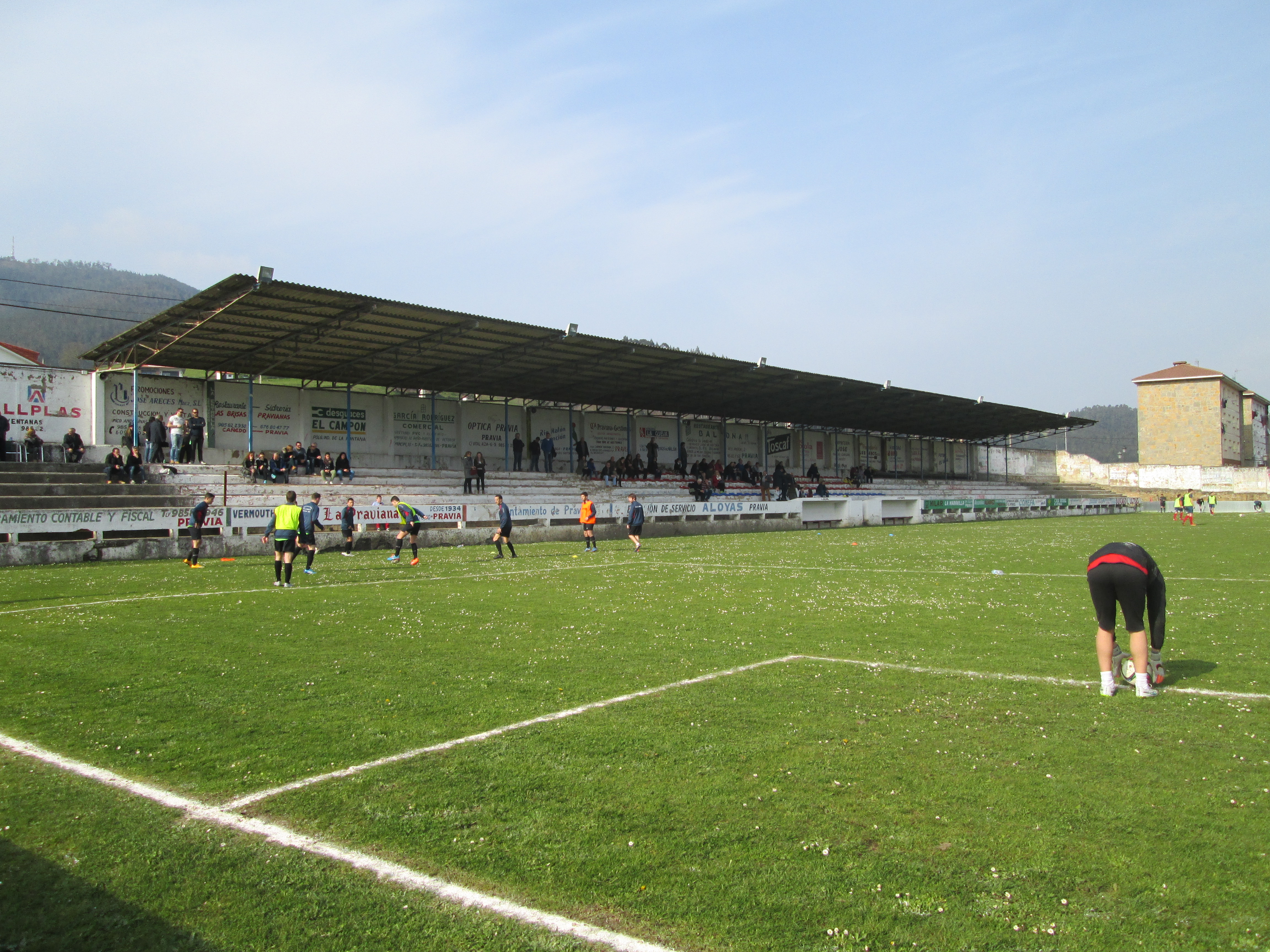
Estadio Santa Catalina, home of Praviano.

Season	Tier	Division	Place	Copa del Rey
1949–50	5	2ª Reg.	3rd	
1950–51	6	2ª Reg. I.	1st	
1951–52	5	2ª Reg.	1st	
1952–53	4	1ª Reg.	5th	
1953–54	4	1ª Reg.	3rd	
1954–55	4	1ª Reg.	5th	
1955–56	4	1ª Reg.	7th	
1956–57	4	1ª Reg.	3rd	
1957–58	4	1ª Reg.	3rd	
1958–59	3	3ª	13th	
1959–60	3	3ª	10th	
1960–61	3	3ª	16th	
1961–62	4	1ª Reg.	8th	
1962–63	4	1ª Reg.	1st	
1963–64	3	3ª	6th	
1964–65	3	3ª	2nd	
1965–66	3	3ª	1st	
1966–67	3	3ª	5th	
1967–68	3	3ª	8th	
1968–69	3	3ª	16th	

Season	Tier	Division	Place	Copa del Rey
1969–70	3	3ª	19th	
1970–71	4	1ª Reg.	10th	
1971–72	4	1ª Reg.	17th	
1972–73	4	1ª Reg.	4th	
1973–74	4	Reg. Pref.	4th	
1974–75	4	Reg. Pref.	13th	
1975–76	4	Reg. Pref.	18th	
1976–77	5	2ª Reg. P.	5th	
1977–78	5	Reg. Pref.	17th	
1978–79	5	Reg. Pref.	17th	
1979–80	5	Reg. Pref.	17th	
1980–81	5	Reg. Pref.	4th	
1981–82	5	Reg. Pref.	5th	
1982–83	5	Reg. Pref.	9th	
1983–84	5	Reg. Pref.	10th	
1984–85	5	Reg. Pref.	6th	
1985–86	5	Reg. Pref.	13th	
1986–87	5	Reg. Pref.	14th	
1987–88	5	Reg. Pref.	1st	
1988–89	4	3ª	4th	

Season	Tier	Division	Place	Copa del Rey
1989–90	4	3ª	5th	
1990–91	4	3ª	5th	First round
1991–92	4	3ª	19th	Second round
1992–93	5	Reg. Pref.	5th	
1993–94	5	Reg. Pref.	2nd	
1994–95	4	3ª	12th	
1995–96	4	3ª	20th	
1996–97	5	Reg. Pref.	2nd	
1997–98	4	3ª	18th	
1998–99	5	Reg. Pref.	14th	
1999–2000	5	Reg. Pref.	7th	
2000–01	5	Reg. Pref.	13th	
2001–02	5	Reg. Pref.	12th	
2002–03	5	Reg. Pref.	19th	
2003–04	6	1ª Reg.	8th	
2004–05	6	1ª Reg.	1st	
2005–06	5	Reg. Pref.	4th	
2006–07	4	3ª	18th	
2007–08	5	Reg. Pref.	9th	
2008–09	5	Reg. Pref.	1st	

Season	Tier	Division	Place	Copa del Rey
2009–10	4	3ª	16th	
2010–11	4	3ª	20th	
2011–12	5	Reg. Pref.	1st	
2012–13	4	3ª	11th	
2013–14	4	3ª	4th	
2014–15	4	3ª	8th	
2015–16	4	3ª	14th	
2016–17	4	3ª	14th	
2017–18	4	3ª	8th	
2018–19	4	3ª	10th	N/A (Note: Second reserve team of Oviedo.)
2019–20	4	3ª	11th	
2020–21	4	3ª	7th / 1st	
2021–22	5	3ª RFEF	8th	
2022–23	5	3ª Fed.	5th	
2023–24	5	3ª Fed.	6th	
2024–25	5	3ª Fed.	8th	
2025–26	5	3ª Fed.	9th	
2026–27	5	3ª Fed.		

- 29 seasons in Tercera División
- 6 seasons in Tercera Federación/Tercera División RFEF
