= SD Leioa =

Coordinates: 43.334881°N 2.981491°W

Leioa
- Full name: Sociedad Deportiva Leioa
- Founded: 1925
- Ground: Sarriena, Leioa, Basque Country, Spain
- Capacity: 3,741
- President: (Spain) Javier Landeta
- Head coach: (Spain) Iker Bilbao
- League: Tercera Federación – Group 4
- 2025–26: Tercera Federación – Group 4, 2nd of 18
- Website: sdleioa.com
Home colours	Away colours

Sociedad Deportiva Leioa is a Spanish football team based in Leioa, in the autonomous community of Basque Country. Founded in 1925 it plays in Tercera Federación – Group 4, holding home games at Estadio Sarriena, which has a capacity of 3,741 spectators.

== History ==
In the 2017–18 season, the club finished 10th in the Segunda División B, Group 2.

== Season to season ==
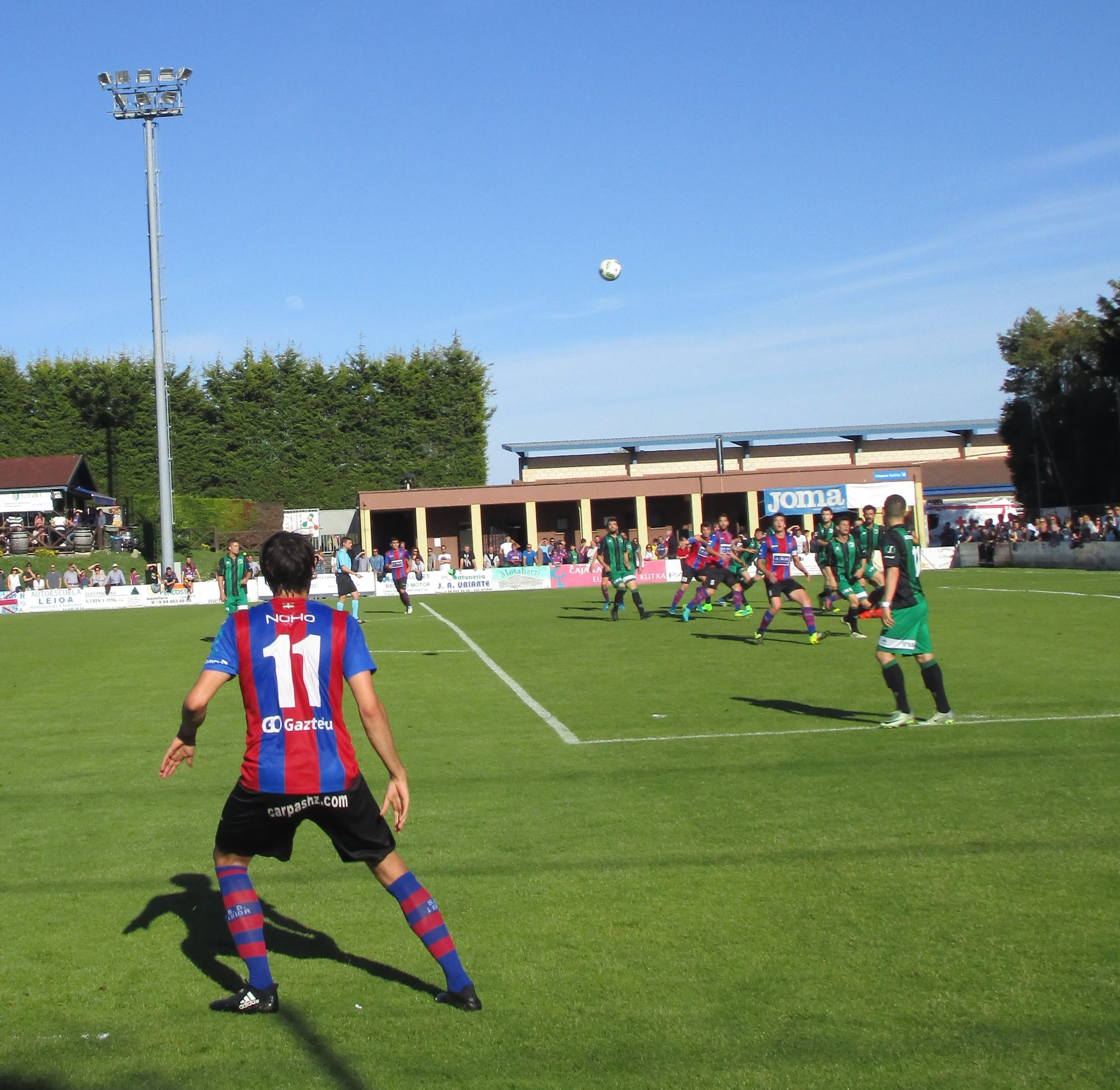
Match between Leioa and Sestao at Sarriena, 2017

Season	Tier	Division	Place	Copa del Rey
1978–79	7	2ª Reg.	9th	
1979–80	7	2ª Reg.	9th	
1980–81	7	2ª Reg.	6th	
1981–82	7	2ª Reg.	6th	
1982–83	7	2ª Reg.	3rd	
1983–84	7	2ª Reg.	7th	
1984–85	7	2ª Reg.	4th	
1985–86	7	2ª Reg.	5th	
1986–87	7	2ª Reg.	5th	
1987–88	7	2ª Reg.	9th	
1988–89	6	1ª Reg.	6th	
1989–90	6	1ª Reg.	15th	
1990–91	6	1ª Reg.	9th	
1991–92	6	1ª Reg.	6th	
1992–93	6	1ª Reg.	3rd	
1993–94	6	1ª Reg.	7th	
1994–95	6	1ª Reg.	5th	
1995–96	6	1ª Reg.	4th	
1996–97	6	1ª Reg.	1st	
1997–98	5	Reg. Pref.	12th	

Season	Tier	Division	Place	Copa del Rey
1998–99	5	Reg. Pref.	15th	
1999–2000	5	Reg. Pref.	13th	
2000–01	5	Reg. Pref.	10th	
2001–02	5	Reg. Pref.	9th	
2002–03	5	Div. Hon.	3rd	
2003–04	5	Div. Hon.	9th	
2004–05	5	Div. Hon.	6th	
2005–06	5	Div. Hon.	13th	
2006–07	5	Div. Hon.	4th	
2007–08	5	Div. Hon.	1st	
2008–09	4	3ª	11th	
2009–10	4	3ª	16th	
2010–11	4	3ª	9th	
2011–12	4	3ª	8th	
2012–13	4	3ª	4th	
2013–14	4	3ª	1st	
2014–15	3	2ª B	15th	Third round
2015–16	3	2ª B	16th	
2016–17	3	2ª B	5th	
2017–18	3	2ª B	10th	Second round

Season	Tier	Division	Place	Copa del Rey
2018–19	3	2ª B	7th	Second round
2019–20	3	2ª B	15th	First round
2020–21	3	2ª B	11th / 8th	
2021–22	5	3ª RFEF	9th	First round
2022–23	5	3ª Fed.	3rd	
2023–24	5	3ª Fed.	9th	
2024–25	5	3ª Fed.	3rd	
2025–26	5	3ª Fed.	2nd	
2026–27	5	3ª Fed.		

- 7 season in Segunda División B
- 6 seasons in Tercera División
- 6 seasons in Tercera Federación/Tercera División RFEF

== Current squad ==
As of 29 March 2021

Note: Flags indicate national team as defined under FIFA eligibility rules; some limited exceptions apply. Players may hold more than one non-FIFA nationality.

No.	Pos.	Nation	Player
1	GK	ESP	Urtzi Iturrioz (captain)
2	DF	ESP	Aitor Morcillo
3	DF	ARG	Matías Sánchez
4	DF	ESP	Xabier Etxebarria
5	DF	ESP	Koldo Berasaluze
6	DF	ESP	Mikel Juaristi
7	FW	ESP	Asier Goti
8	MF	ESP	Gorka Garai
9	FW	ESP	Lander Yurrebaso
10	FW	ESP	Sergio García
11	FW	CPV	Raly Cabral

No.	Pos.	Nation	Player
12	MF	KOR	Sang-min Park
13	GK	ESP	Aritz De Miguel (on loan from Bilbao B)
15	DF	ESP	Jon Agirrezabala
16	FW	ESP	Jaime Dios (on loan from Vitoria)
17	FW	ESP	Xabi Mayordomo
18	DF	ESP	David Morante (on loan from Real Valladolid B)
19	FW	ESP	Adrián Vich
20	FW	ESP	Mikel Pradera
21	DF	ESP	Roger Marcè
22	MF	ESP	Arturo Segado

== Honours ==
- Tercera División: (Note: Fourth tier) 2013–14 (Note: Promoted in play-offs)

== Former players ==
Internationals:

- (Equatorial Guinea) Chupe
- (Equatorial Guinea) Gorka Luariz
