= Ángel Bernabé =

Spanish footballer (born 1987)

Personal information
- Full name: Ángel Bernabé Acosta
- Date of birth: 11 August 1987 (age 39)
- Place of birth: Velada, Spain
- Height: 1.87 m (6 ft 1 1/2 in)
- Position: Goalkeeper

Team information
- Current team: Socuéllamos
- Number: 1

Youth career
- Gamonal
- Umaba
- UD Talavera
- Talavera CF
- Atlético Madrid

Senior career*
| Years | Team | Apps | (Gls) |
| 2005–2007 | Atlético Madrid C | | |
| 2007–2008 | Atlético Madrid B | 17 | (0) |
| 2008–2009 | Atlético Madrid | 0 | (0) |
| 2009–2012 | Salamanca | 42 | (0) |
| 2012–2013 | Cádiz | 5 | (0) |
| 2013 | → Sanluqueño (loan) | 5 | (0) |
| 2014–2015 | Conquense | 24 | (0) |
| 2015–2016 | Talavera | 25 | (0) |
| 2016–2017 | Marbella | 10 | (0) |
| 2018–2022 | Cacereño | 121 | (0) |
| 2022–2023 | Montijo | 3 | (0) |
| 2023– | Socuéllamos | 79 | (0) |

International career
| 2002 | Spain U16 | 1 | (0) |
| 2006 | Spain U19 | 1 | (0) |
- * Club domestic league appearances and goals as of 16 May 2026

Ángel Bernabé Acosta (born 11 August 1987) is a Spanish footballer who plays as a goalkeeper for Socuéllamos.

== Club career ==
Born in Velada, Province of Toledo, Bernabé played for some local clubs before joining Atlético Madrid at the age of 18 and going through its various youth levels. In the 2008–09 season he was promoted to the first team due for preseason in Mexico, but spent the campaign mainly registered with the B-side while having third-choice duties with the main squad, behind established Leo Franco and Grégory Coupet.

In June 2009, Bernabé was released by the Colchoneros, joining second division's UD Salamanca. He played in only seven league games in his first two years combined, with the second ending in relegation; his debut as a professional occurred on 2 September 2009 in a 1–1 home draw against CD Castellón for the Copa del Rey, and he first appeared in the league 18 days later, in a 0–1 home loss to UD Las Palmas.

== International career ==
Bernabé was part of the Spain under-19 team for the 2006 UEFA European Championship, where the nation emerged victorious. The following year, again as backup, he was selected for the 2007 FIFA U-20 World Cup.

== Honours ==
Spain U19

- UEFA European Under-19 Championship: 2006
