= SE Penya Independent =

Association football club in Spain

Penya Independent
- Full name: Societat Esportiva Penya Independent
- Founded: 1975
- Ground: Municipal; Sant Miquel de Balansat, Ibiza; Balearic Islands, Spain
- Capacity: 2,000
- President: Toni Curuné
- Manager: Mario Ormaechea
- 2024–25: Tercera Federación – Group 11, 5th of 18
Home colours	Away colours

Societat Esportiva Penya Independent is a Spanish football club based in Sant Miquel de Balansat, in the island of Ibiza, in the Balearic Islands. Founded in 1975, they hold home games at Campo Municipal de Futbol de Sant Miquel, with a capacity of 2,000 people.

== History ==
Founded in 1975, Penya Independent played in the regional leagues until 2014, when the club became inactive. Back to action in 2019, the club played two seasons in the Regional Preferente before winning the Copa del Rey play-offs in 2021, subsequently qualifying to the preliminary rounds of the 2021–22 Copa del Rey; they were knocked out by CFJ Mollerussa, however.

On 19 June 2022, Penya Independent achieved a first-ever promotion to Tercera Federación, after defeating SCR Peña Deportiva's reserve team.

On 4 June 2023, Penya Independent achieved his second successive promotion defeating Ejea after extra time in the 2023 Tercera Federación play-offs after finishing in third position in regular league. The club was relegated after one season, and in July 2025, after missing out promotion in the play-offs, their president Toni Curuné announced that he would leave his role and that "the new board was not interested in keeping the club in a national division", only remaining with the youth categories.

== Season to season ==
Season	Tier	Division	Place	Copa del Rey
1986–87	5	Reg. Pref.	6th	
1987–88	DNP			
1988–89	5	Reg. Pref.	5th	
1989–90	5	Reg. Pref.	6th	
1990–91	5	Reg. Pref.	3rd	
1991–92	5	Reg. Pref.	7th	
1992–93	5	Reg. Pref.	3rd	
1993–94	5	Reg. Pref.	6th	
1994–95	5	Reg. Pref.	5th	
1995–96	5	Reg. Pref.	2nd	
1996–97	5	Reg. Pref.	4th	
1997–98	5	Reg. Pref.	4th	
1998–99	5	Reg. Pref.	4th	
1999–2000	5	Reg. Pref.	3rd	
2000–01	5	Reg. Pref.	8th	
2001–02	5	Reg. Pref.	2nd	
2002–03	5	Reg. Pref.	3rd	
2003–04	5	Reg. Pref.	4th	

Season	Tier	Division	Place	Copa del Rey
2004–05	5	Reg. Pref.	11th	
2005–06	5	Reg. Pref.	11th	
2006–07	5	Reg. Pref.	5th	
2007–08	5	Reg. Pref.	6th	
2008–09	5	Reg. Pref.	11th	
2009–10	5	Reg. Pref.	11th	
2010–11	5	Reg. Pref.	10th	
2011–12	5	Reg. Pref.	9th	
2012–13	5	Reg. Pref.	10th	
2013–14	5	Reg. Pref.	13th	
2014–2019	DNP			
2019–20	5	Reg. Pref.	3rd	
2020–21	5	Reg. Pref.	2nd	
2021–22	6	Reg. Pref.	2nd	Preliminary
2022–23	5	3ª Fed.	3rd	
2023–24	4	2ª Fed.	16th	
2024–25	5	3ª Fed.	5th	

- 1 season in Segunda Federación
- 2 seasons in Tercera Federación

== Current squad ==
As of 5 February 2024

Note: Flags indicate national team as defined under FIFA eligibility rules; some limited exceptions apply. Players may hold more than one non-FIFA nationality.

No.	Pos.	Nation	Player
1	GK	ESP	Lucas Martínez
2	DF	DOM	José de la Cruz
3	DF	ESP	Curuné
4	DF	ESP	Sebas González
5	DF	ESP	Álex Revuelta
6	MF	ESP	Marcos Bautista
7	FW	ESP	Javi Verdú
8	MF	ESP	Samu Pinto
9	FW	ESP	Joan Piera
10	FW	ESP	Vicent Albert
11	DF	ESP	Rulo Prieto

No.	Pos.	Nation	Player
12	DF	ESP	Jorge Mena
13	GK	ESP	Dani Simón
14	DF	ARG	Fernando Losada
16	MF	ESP	Borja Jiménez
17	DF	ESP	Diego Espinosa
18	DF	ESP	Juanmi Heredero
19	FW	ESP	Rayco Pérez
20	FW	FRA	Bazo
21	DF	ESP	Lucas González
22	GK	ESP	Dani Guiseris
23	FW	ESP	Jaime Isuardi
