= UD Socuéllamos =

Association football club in Spain

Socuéllamos
- Full name: Yugo-Unión Deportiva Socuéllamos Club de Fútbol
- Founded: 26 December 1924; 101 years ago
- Stadium: Paquito Jiménez
- Capacity: 2,500
- President: Sebastian Espinosa Palacios
- Head coach: Jacinto Trillo
- League: Tercera Federación – Group 18
- 2025–26: Segunda Federación – Group 5, 17th of 18 (relegated)
Home colours	Away colours

Yugo-Unión Deportiva Socuéllamos Club de Fútbol is a Spanish football team based in Socuéllamos, Ciudad Real, in the autonomous community of Castilla-La Mancha. Founded in 1924, it plays in Tercera Federación – Group 18, holding home games at 2,500-seat Estadio Paquito Jiménez .

== History ==
In 2014, UD Socuéllamos promoted for the first time in its history to Segunda División B, after beating in the promotion play-offs CD Praviano, CE Europa and Linares Deportivo.

Just two years later, the club qualified to the promotion play-offs to Segunda División but just the next season, the club was relegated to Tercera División after spending three years in the third tier.

== Season to season ==
Season	Tier	Division	Place	Copa del Rey
1943–44	4	1ª Reg.	8th	
1944–45	4	1ª Reg.	3rd	
1945–1952	DNP			
1952–53	4	1ª Reg.	(R)	
1953–54	DNP			
1954–55	DNP			
1955–56	4	1ª Reg.	7th	
1956–1960	DNP			
1960–61	4	1ª Reg.	5th	
1961–62	4	1ª Reg.	5th	
1962–63	4	1ª Reg.	1st	
1963–64	3	3ª	6th	
1964–65	3	3ª	6th	
1965–66	3	3ª	12th	
1966–67	3	3ª	5th	
1967–68	3	3ª	12th	
1968–69	4	1ª Reg.	2nd	
1969–70	4	1ª Reg.	8th	
1970–71	4	1ª Reg.	10th	
1971–72	4	1ª Reg.	12th	

Season	Tier	Division	Place	Copa del Rey
1972–73	4	1ª Reg.	17th	
1973–74	5	1ª Reg.	9th	
1974–75	5	1ª Reg.	17th	
1975–76	6	2ª Reg.	8th	
1976–77	6	2ª Reg.	8th	
1977–78	7	2ª Reg.	2nd	
1978–79	6	1ª Reg.	11th	
1979–80	6	1ª Reg.	9th	
1980–81	6	1ª Reg.	10th	
1981–82	6	1ª Reg.	10th	
1982–83	6	1ª Reg.	5th	
1983–84	6	1ª Reg.	6th	
1984–85	6	1ª Reg.	15th	
1985–86	7	2ª Reg.	4th	
1986–87	6	1ª Reg.	1st	
1987–88	5	Reg. Pref.	10th	
1988–89	5	Reg. Pref.	4th	
1989–90	5	Reg. Pref.	1st	
1990–91	4	3ª	4th	
1991–92	4	3ª	12th	

Season	Tier	Division	Place	Copa del Rey
1992–93	4	3ª	8th	
1993–94	4	3ª	20th	
1994–95	5	Reg. Pref.	3rd	
1995–96	5	1ª Aut.	1st	
1996–97	4	3ª	9th	
1997–98	4	3ª	17th	
1998–99	4	3ª	11th	
1999–2000	4	3ª	6th	
2000–01	4	3ª	19th	
2001–02	5	1ª Aut.	1st	
2002–03	4	3ª	12th	
2003–04	4	3ª	10th	
2004–05	4	3ª	17th	
2005–06	4	3ª	8th	
2006–07	4	3ª	17th	
2007–08	4	3ª	16th	
2008–09	4	3ª	5th	
2009–10	4	3ª	16th	
2010–11	4	3ª	11th	
2011–12	4	3ª	16th	

Season	Tier	Division	Place	Copa del Rey
2012–13	5	1ª Aut.	1st	
2013–14	4	3ª	2nd	
2014–15	3	2ª B	8th	
2015–16	3	2ª B	3rd	Second round
2016–17	3	2ª B	18th	First round
2017–18	4	3ª	3rd	
2018–19	4	3ª	1st	
2019–20	4	3ª	1st	First round
2020–21	3	2ª B	9th / 2nd	Second round
2021–22	4	2ª RFEF	12th	
2022–23	4	2ª Fed.	17th	
2023–24	5	3ª Fed.	4th	
2024–25	5	3ª Fed.	1st	
2025–26	4	2ª Fed.	17th	
2026–27	5	3ª Fed.		

- 4 seasons in Segunda División B
- 3 seasons in Segunda Federación/Segunda División RFEF
- 28 seasons in Tercera División
- 3 seasons in Tercera Federación

== Current squad ==
As of 14 April 2026

Note: Flags indicate national team as defined under FIFA eligibility rules; some limited exceptions apply. Players may hold more than one non-FIFA nationality.

No.	Pos.	Nation	Player
1	GK	ESP	Ángel Bernabé
2	DF	ESP	Álvaro Escobar
3	DF	ESP	Pablo Morillo
4	DF	ESP	Javi Arteaga
5	DF	ESP	Borja Ferrando
6	MF	ESP	Adrián Díaz
7	FW	ESP	Iván Hujo
8	MF	ESP	Miguel Rodrigáñez
9	FW	ESP	Carmelo Merenciano
10	MF	ESP	Santi Fiel
11	MF	ESP	Manu Martínez
12	MF	BFA	Abdoul Bandaogo

No.	Pos.	Nation	Player
13	GK	ESP	Adri López
14	MF	ESP	Juanma Porro
15	DF	ESP	Sergio Pérez
16	DF	GHA	Joshua Anaba
17	DF	ESP	Adrián Díaz
18	FW	ESP	José Carlos
19	FW	ESP	Marcos Legaz
20	MF	GHA	Samuel Yemoh
21	FW	ESP	Javi Verdú
22	DF	ESP	Carlos García
23	DF	ESP	Ale Santos
