= José Luis de la Cruz =

Dominican footballer

Personal information
- Full name: José Luis de la Cruz Melo
- Date of birth: 5 July 2000 (age 26)
- Place of birth: Azua, Dominican Republic
- Positions: Right back; winger

Team information
- Current team: SE Penya Independent

Youth career
- 2014–2016: Carabanchel
- 2016–2017: EMF Aluche
- 2017–2018: Carabanchel
- 2018–2019: Rayo Majadahonda

Senior career*
Years	Team	Apps	(Gls)
2019–2020	Atlético Pinto	8	(0)
2020–2022	Carabanchel	50	(1)
2022-	SE Penya Independent	46	(4)

International career^{‡}
2021–	Dominican Republic U23	1	(0)
2021–	Dominican Republic	2	(0)
- * Club domestic league appearances and goals as of 20 December 2020. ‡ National team caps and goals as of 18 March 2021.

José Luis de la Cruz Melo (born 5 July 2000) is a Dominican footballer who plays as a right back for Segunda RFEF club SE Penya Independent and the Dominican Republic national team.

== International career ==
De la Cruz made his senior debut for the Dominican Republic national football team on 25 January 2021.

== Personal life ==
De la Cruz also holds Spanish citizenship.
