= UD Somozas =

Spanish football club

Coordinates: 43.533932°N 7.941041°W

Somozas
- Full name: Unión Deportiva Somozas
- Founded: 1984; 42 years ago
- Stadium: Estadio Pardiñas
- Capacity: 1,500
- President: Juan Alonso Tembrás
- Head coach: Stili
- League: Tercera Federación – Group 1
- 2025–26: Tercera Federación – Group 1, 7th of 18
- Website: www.udsomozas.com
Home colours	Away colours

Unión Deportiva Somozas is a football club based in As Somozas in the autonomous community of Galicia. Founded in 1984, the club currently plays in Tercera Federación – Group 1. The club played their home matches at Estadio Pardiñas, which has a capacity of 1,500 spectators.

== History ==
Founded in 1984, Somozas started to play as a senior in the following year, achieving promotion after finishing fourth in the Segunda Regional. In 1993, the club achieved promotion to Tercera División.

In 1999, after suffering relegation from the fourth division, Somozas chose not to play in the Regional Preferente and nor in the Primera Regional, returning to the seventh division. The club only returned to the fourth tier in 2008, and reached the Segunda División B for the first time six years later.

In June 2026, Somozas reached an agreement with Racing de Ferrol to act as their reserve team.

== Season to season ==
Season	Tier	Division	Place	Copa del Rey
1985–86	7	2ª Reg.	4th	
1986–87	6	1ª Reg.	4th	
1987–88	6	1ª Reg.	10th	
1988–89	6	1ª Reg.	6th	
1989–90	6	1ª Reg.	1st	
1990–91	6	1ª Reg.	1st	
1991–92	5	Reg. Pref.	9th	
1992–93	5	Reg. Pref.	2nd	
1993–94	4	3ª	13th	
1994–95	4	3ª	17th	
1995–96	4	3ª	15th	
1996–97	4	3ª	12th	
1997–98	4	3ª	17th	
1998–99	4	3ª	20th	
1999–2000	7	2ª Reg.	2nd	
2000–01	7	2ª Reg.	1st	
2001–02	7	2ª Reg.	1st	
2002–03	7	2ª Reg.	1st	
2003–04	7	2ª Reg.	3rd	
2004–05	7	2ª Reg.	1st	

Season	Tier	Division	Place	Copa del Rey
2005–06	7	2ª Reg.	1st	
2006–07	6	1ª Aut.	2nd	
2007–08	5	Pref. Aut.	2nd	
2008–09	4	3ª	11th	
2009–10	4	3ª	16th	
2010–11	4	3ª	5th	
2011–12	4	3ª	11th	
2012–13	4	3ª	12th	
2013–14	4	3ª	1st	
2014–15	3	2ª B	10th	Second round
2015–16	3	2ª B	8th	
2016–17	3	2ª B	20th	
2017–18	4	3ª	6th	
2018–19	4	3ª	14th	
2019–20	4	3ª	15th	
2020–21	4	3ª	3rd / 5th	
2021–22	5	3ª RFEF	3rd	
2022–23	5	3ª Fed.	8th	
2023–24	5	3ª Fed.	7th	
2024–25	5	3ª Fed.	10th	

Season	Tier	Division	Place	Copa del Rey
2025–26	5	3ª Fed.	7th	
2026–27	5	3ª Fed.		N/A (Note: Reserve team of Racing Ferrol.)

- 3 seasons in Segunda División B
- 16 seasons in Tercera División
- 6 seasons in Tercera Federación/Tercera División RFEF

== Honours ==
Tercera División

- Winners: 2013–14
