= Atlético Astorga FC =

Association football club in Spain

Atlético Astorga
- Full name: Atlético Astorga Fútbol Club
- Founded: 1944; 82 years ago
- Ground: La Eragudina; Astorga, Castile and León, Spain
- Capacity: 3,000
- President: Sagrario González
- Head coach: Joselu Lago
- League: Segunda Federación – Group 5
- 2025–26: Segunda Federación – Group 1, 11th of 18
Home colours	Away colours

Atlético Astorga Fútbol Club is a Spanish football team based in Astorga in the autonomous community of Castile and León. Founded in 1944, it plays in the Segunda Federación – Group 5. Its stadium is Estadio La Eragudina with a capacity of 3,000 seats.

== History ==
In August 2017, Atlético Astorga announced links with Aspire Academy whose network of clubs include Cultural y Deportiva Leonesa and Leeds United. The link up saw some Aspire based players join the club.

=== Club's background ===
- Astorga Club de Fútbol - (1944–1951)
- Club Deportivo Astorga - (1951–1972)
- Atlético Astorga Fútbol Club - (1973–)

== Season to season ==
=== As CD Astorga ===
Season	Tier	Division	Place	Copa del Rey
1944–45	4	1ª Reg.		
1945–46	4	1ª Reg.		
1946–47	4	1ª Reg.	1st	
1947–48	4	1ª Reg.		
1948–49	4	1ª Reg.		
1949–50	4	1ª Reg.		
1950–51	4	1ª Reg.		
1951–52	4	1ª Reg.		
1952–53	4	1ª Reg.		
1953–54	4	1ª Reg.		
1954–55	4	1ª Reg.		
1955–56	4	1ª Reg.		
1956–57	3	3ª	10th	
1957–58	3	3ª	11th	

Season	Tier	Division	Place	Copa del Rey
1958–59	3	3ª	15th	
1959–60	3	3ª	10th	
1960–61	3	3ª	16th	
1961–62	3	3ª	9th	
1962–63	3	3ª	15th	
1963–64	3	3ª	14th	
1964–65	3	3ª	14th	
1965–66	3	3ª	16th	
1966–67	4	1ª Reg.	2nd	
1967–68	4	1ª Reg.		
1968–69	4	1ª Reg.	1st	
1969–70	4	1ª Reg.	5th	
1970–71	5	1ª Reg.	4th	
1971–72	6	2ª Reg.	3rd	

- 10 seasons in Tercera División

=== As Atlético Astorga ===
Season	Tier	Division	Place	Copa del Rey
1973–74	5	1ª Reg.	1st	
1974–75	4	Reg. Pref.	19th	
1975–76	5	1ª Reg.	1st	
1976–77	4	Reg. Pref.	17th	
1977–78	5	Reg. Pref.	13th	
1978–79	5	Reg. Pref.	16th	
1979–80	5	Reg. Pref.	7th	
1980–81	4	3ª	7th	
1981–82	4	3ª	12th	Second round
1982–83	4	3ª	5th	
1983–84	4	3ª	3rd	First round
1984–85	4	3ª	6th	First round
1985–86	4	3ª	6th	First round
1986–87	4	3ª	12th	
1987–88	4	3ª	11th	
1988–89	4	3ª	9th	
1989–90	4	3ª	8th	
1990–91	4	3ª	9th	
1991–92	4	3ª	2nd	
1992–93	4	3ª	19th	First round

Season	Tier	Division	Place	Copa del Rey
1993–94	5	Reg. Pref.	8th	
1994–95	5	Reg. Pref.	2nd	
1995–96	4	3ª	15th	
1996–97	4	3ª	13th	
1997–98	4	3ª	19th	
1998–99	5	Reg. Pref.	4th	
1999–2000	4	3ª	14th	
2000–01	4	3ª	18th	
2001–02	5	1ª Reg.	4th	
2002–03	5	1ª Reg.	2nd	
2003–04	5	1ª Reg.	4th	
2004–05	5	1ª Reg.	6th	
2005–06	5	1ª Reg.	9th	
2006–07	5	1ª Reg.	3rd	
2007–08	5	1ª Reg.	1st	
2008–09	4	3ª	15th	
2009–10	4	3ª	11th	
2010–11	4	3ª	12th	
2011–12	4	3ª	6th	
2012–13	4	3ª	7th	

Season	Tier	Division	Place	Copa del Rey
2013–14	4	3ª	2nd	
2014–15	3	2ª B	14th	First round
2015–16	3	2ª B	18th	
2016–17	4	3ª	2nd	
2017–18	4	3ª	5th	
2018–19	4	3ª	5th	
2019–20	4	3ª	7th	
2020–21	4	3ª	2nd / 3rd	
2021–22	5	3ª RFEF	9th	
2022–23	5	3ª Fed.	2nd	
2023–24	5	3ª Fed.	5th	Second round
2024–25	5	3ª Fed.	1st	
2025–26	4	2ª Fed.	11th	First round
2026–27	4	2ª Fed.		

- 2 seasons in Segunda División B
- 2 seasons in Segunda Federación
- 29 seasons in Tercera División
- 4 seasons in Tercera Federación/Tercera División RFEF

== Current squad ==
As of 26 September 2025

Note: Flags indicate national team as defined under FIFA eligibility rules; some limited exceptions apply. Players may hold more than one non-FIFA nationality.

No.	Pos.	Nation	Player
1	GK	ESP	Diego Llamazares
2	DF	ESP	Dani Rodríguez
3	DF	ESP	Dani Ceínos
4	DF	ESP	Jony Lopes
5	DF	ESP	Pedro Augusto
6	MF	ESP	Albertín
7	DF	ESP	Sergio Fernández
8	MF	ESP	Christian Bueno
9	FW	ESP	Ayoub El Battioui
10	MF	ESP	David Álvarez
11	FW	ESP	Javi Álvarez
13	GK	ESP	Martín Cascajo

No.	Pos.	Nation	Player
14	DF	ESP	Miguel Ángel Manso
15	MF	ESP	Aleixo Cabral
16	MF	ESP	Iván Barajas
17	MF	ESP	Adrián Álvarez
18	DF	ESP	Jesús Jiménez
19	FW	ESP	Álex Ribeiro
20	FW	ESP	Ángel Cerveró
21	FW	ESP	Ivi Vales
22	DF	ESP	Jorge Sellés
23	FW	ESP	Mario Sánchez
24	MF	ALG	Imad El Mansouri
