= CF Trival Valderas =

Association football club in Spain

Trival Valderas
- Full name: Club de Fútbol Trival Valderas Alcorcón
- Founded: 2004
- Ground: La Canaleja, Alcorcón, Madrid, Spain
- Capacity: 2,000
- Chairman: Esteban Fernández
- Manager: David Galán
- League: Tercera Federación – Group 7
- 2025–26: Tercera Federación – Group 7, 2nd of 18
- Website: www.trivalvalderas.com
Home colours	Away colours

Club de Fútbol Trival Valderas Alcorcón is a Spanish football team based in Alcorcón, in the Community of Madrid. Founded in 2004, it currently plays in Tercera Federación – Group 7, holding home matches at Estadio La Canaleja, with a 2,000-seat capacity.

== History ==
In the year 2004, AP Tri-Val (founded in 1972) and Unión Deportiva de San José de Valderas (born the year before) merged to create Club de Fútbol Trival Valderas. It first reached national competition (Tercera División) five years later. The beginning of the new decade was difficult, as in the 2010-11 and 2011-12 seasons the club had to fight to stay and avoid falling into one of the relegation places in Tercera División. Finally it saved its place in the Spanish fourth tier both times.

== Season to season ==
Season	Tier	Division	Place	Copa del Rey
2004–05	5	Reg. Pref.	18th	
2005–06	6	1ª Reg.	8th	
2006–07	6	1ª Reg.	2nd	
2007–08	5	Reg. Pref.	10th	
2008–09	5	Reg. Pref.	2nd	
2009–10	4	3ª	4th	
2010–11	4	3ª	13th	
2011–12	4	3ª	15th	
2012–13	4	3ª	3rd	
2013–14	4	3ª	1st	
2014–15	3	2ª B	19th	First round
2015–16	4	3ª	9th	
2016–17	4	3ª	16th	
2017–18	4	3ª	10th	
2018–19	4	3ª	6th	
2019–20	4	3ª	5th	
2020–21	4	3ª	5th / 6th	
2021–22	5	3ª RFEF	13th	
2022–23	5	3ª Fed.	8th	
2023–24	5	3ª Fed.	12th	

Season	Tier	Division	Place	Copa del Rey
2024–25	5	3ª Fed.	10th	
2025–26	5	3ª Fed.	2nd	
2026–27	5	3ª Fed.		TBD

- 1 season in Segunda División B
- 11 seasons in Tercera División
- 6 seasons in Tercera Federación/Tercera División RFEF

== Current squad ==
As of 8 February 2015

Note: Flags indicate national team as defined under FIFA eligibility rules; some limited exceptions apply. Players may hold more than one non-FIFA nationality.

No.	Pos.	Nation	Player
—	GK	ESP	Roberto Álvarez
—	GK	ESP	Juli
—	GK	ESP	Kike
—	GK	ESP	Basilio
—	DF	ESP	Juanma
—	DF	ESP	Ángel Propín
—	DF	ESP	Álvaro Herrero
—	DF	ESP	Miguel Altares
—	DF	ESP	Diego Zamora
—	DF	ESP	Raúl
—	DF	ESP	Mario Sánchez
—	DF	ESP	Chele
—	DF	ESP	Héctor Galiano

No.	Pos.	Nation	Player
—	MF	ESP	Edgar Torbellino
—	MF	ESP	José Mínguez
—	MF	ESP	Gonzalo
—	MF	ESP	Alberto Noguera
—	MF	ESP	Jesús Cruz
—	MF	ESP	Óscar
—	MF	ESP	David Mancera
—	MF	ESP	Borja Truchado
—	MF	ESP	Jorge Félix
—	FW	ESP	Robert
—	FW	ESP	Alberto Palacios
—	FW	ESP	Joaquín Cerdá

== Honours ==
- Tercera División
  - Champions (1): 2013–14

== Colours ==
Since the 2004 merger, team colours were white shirt, red shorts and green socks.

== See also ==
- CDE Trival Valderas Promesas Alcorcón, reserve team
