= Álex Revuelta =

Spanish footballer (born 2000)

Personal information
- Full name: Alejandro Revuelta Montero
- Date of birth: 16 April 2000 (age 26)
- Place of birth: Jerez de la Frontera, Spain
- Height: 1.91 m (6 ft 3 in)
- Position: Centre back

Team information
- Current team: Antoniano
- Number: 3

Youth career
- 2011–2015: Xerez
- 2015–2016: Xerez Deportivo
- 2016–2017: Málaga
- 2017–2018: Sanluqueño
- 2018–2019: Cádiz

Senior career*
Years	Team	Apps	(Gls)
2019–2020	Cádiz B	0	(0)
2019–2020	→ Xerez (loan)	20	(0)
2020–2021	Guadalajara	23	(3)
2021–2023	Getafe B	61	(6)
2022	Getafe	1	(0)
2023–2024	Penya Independent	30	(2)
2024–2025	Illescas	14	(0)
2025	Atlético Paso	12	(3)
2025–	Antoniano	4	(0)
- * Club domestic league appearances and goals as of 28 September 2025

Alejandro "Álex" Revuelta Montero (born 16 April 2000) is a Spanish professional footballer who plays as a central defender for Segunda Federación club Atlético Antoniano.

== Club career ==
Revuelta was born in Jerez de la Frontera, Cádiz, Andalusia, and represented Xerez CD, Xerez Deportivo FC, Málaga CF, Atlético Sanluqueño CF and Cádiz CF as a youth. On 23 July 2019, he was loaned to former side Xerez, being assigned to the first team in Tercera División.

In September 2020, Revuelta moved to fellow fourth tier side CD Guadalajara. In August of the following year, he joined Getafe CF and was initially assigned to the reserves in Tercera División RFEF.

Revuelta made his first team – and La Liga – debut on 18 September 2022, coming on as a late substitute for Gastón Álvarez in a 2–0 away win over CA Osasuna.

On 3 July 2023, Revuelta signed a contract with Segunda Federación newcomers SE Penya Independent.
