= Jaime Isuardi =

Spanish footballer

Personal information
- Full name: Jaime Isuardi Fernández
- Date of birth: 2 February 1992 (age 34)
- Place of birth: Santander, Spain
- Height: 1.71 m (5 ft 7 in)
- Position: Forward

Team information
- Current team: Atlético Albericia

Youth career
- Racing Santander

Senior career*
| Years | Team | Apps | (Gls) |
| 2010–2013 | Racing B | 67 | (25) |
| 2012–2013 | Racing Santander | 3 | (0) |
| 2013–2015 | Betis B | 18 | (5) |
| 2015 | Zaragoza B | 15 | (1) |
| 2015–2016 | San Roque | 14 | (0) |
| 2016–2018 | Tropezón | 35 | (28) |
| 2018–2019 | Écija | 13 | (2) |
| 2019 | Escobedo | 19 | (12) |
| 2019–2020 | Portugalete | 18 | (7) |
| 2020 | Lorca | 3 | (2) |
| 2020–2021 | Mar Menor | 22 | (8) |
| 2021–2022 | Marbella | 29 | (19) |
| 2022–2023 | Estepona | 15 | (0) |
| 2023–2024 | Penya Independent | 27 | (8) |
| 2024–2025 | Laredo | 29 | (5) |
| 2025– | Atlético Albericia | 9 | (3) |
- * Club domestic league appearances and goals as of 2 November 2025

Jaime Isuardi Fernández (born 2 February 1992) is a Spanish footballer who plays for Tercera Federación club Atlético Albericia as a forward.

== Club career ==
Isuardi was born in Santander, Cantabria. A product of local giants Racing de Santander's youth system, he made his first-team – and La Liga – debut on 1 May 2012, playing 11 minutes in a 1–1 away draw against Getafe CF. He spent the vast majority of his spell registered with the B-side, however.

On 30 May 2013, Isuardi signed for Real Betis, being assigned to the reserves in Tercera División. On 20 January 2015, he moved to another reserve team, Real Zaragoza B.
