= Paterna CF =

Paterna
- Full name: Paterna Club de Fútbol
- Founded: 27 December 1928; 97 years ago
- Ground: Gerardo Salvador, Paterna, Valencian Community, Spain
- Capacity: 8,000
- Chairman: Diego Ramón
- Manager: Luis Navarro López
- League: Primera FFCV – Group 1
- 2025–26: Primera FFCV – Group 2, 8th of 16
- Website: https://paternacdf.com/
Home colours	Away colours

Peterna Club de Fútbol is a Spanish football team based in Paterna, in the autonomous community of Valencian Community. Founded in 1934, it plays in Primera FFCV – Group 1, holding home matches at Estadio Municipal Gerardo Salvador. The club is famous for dedicating many efforts to its school throughout its history.

== Season to season ==
Season	Tier	Division	Place	Copa del Rey
1946–47	5	2ª Reg.		
1947–48	5	2ª Reg.		
1948–49	5	2ª Reg.	5th	
1949–50	5	2ª Reg.		
1950–51	5	2ª Reg.		
1951–52	5	2ª Reg.		
1952–53	5	2ª Reg.		
1953–54	5	1ª Reg.	7th	
1954–55	5	1ª Reg.	1st	
1955–56	4	1ª Reg.	10th	
1956–57	4	1ª Reg.	3rd	
1957–58	4	1ª Reg.	11th	
1958–59	4	1ª Reg.	15th	
1959–60	4	1ª Reg.	14th	
1960–61	4	1ª Reg.	16th	
1961–62	4	1ª Reg.	18th	
1962–63	4	1ª Reg.	18th	
1963–64	4	1ª Reg.	10th	
1964–65	4	1ª Reg.	6th	
1965–66	4	1ª Reg.	10th	

Season	Tier	Division	Place	Copa del Rey
1966–67	4	1ª Reg.	15th	
1967–68	4	1ª Reg.	5th	
1968–69	4	1ª Reg.	12th	
1969–70	4	1ª Reg.	13th	
1970–71	4	Reg. Pref.	15th	
1971–72	4	Reg. Pref.	4th	
1972–73	4	Reg. Pref.	7th	
1973–74	4	Reg. Pref.	9th	
1974–75	4	Reg. Pref.	3rd	
1975–76	4	Reg. Pref.	3rd	
1976–77	4	Reg. Pref.	4th	
1977–78	4	3ª	10th	First round
1978–79	4	3ª	19th	First round
1979–80	4	3ª	20th	First round
1980–81	4	3ª	15th	
1981–82	4	3ª	13th	
1982–83	4	3ª	16th	
1983–84	4	3ª	20th	
1984–85	5	Reg. Pref.	17th	
1985–86	6	1ª Reg.	6th	

Season	Tier	Division	Place	Copa del Rey
1986–87	6	1ª Reg.	3rd	
1987–88	6	1ª Reg.	3rd	
1988–89	6	1ª Reg.	11th	
1989–90	6	1ª Reg.	1st	
1990–91	5	Reg. Pref.	1st	
1991–92	4	3ª	15th	
1992–93	5	Reg. Pref.	12th	
1993–94	5	Reg. Pref.	18th	
1994–95	6	1ª Reg.	3rd	
1995–96	6	1ª Reg.	3rd	
1996–97	6	1ª Reg.	16th	
1997–98	6	1ª Reg.	2nd	
1998–99	5	Reg. Pref.	7th	
1999–2000	5	Reg. Pref.	1st	
2000–01	5	Reg. Pref.	3rd	
2001–02	5	Reg. Pref.	12th	
2002–03	5	Reg. Pref.	3rd	
2003–04	5	Reg. Pref.	1st	
2004–05	4	3ª	18th	
2005–06	5	Reg. Pref.	2nd	

Season	Tier	Division	Place	Copa del Rey
2006–07	5	Reg. Pref.	10th	
2007–08	5	Reg. Pref.	5th	
2008–09	5	Reg. Pref.	1st	
2009–10	5	Reg. Pref.	3rd	
2010–11	5	Reg. Pref.	10th	
2011–12	5	Reg. Pref.	7th	
2012–13	5	Reg. Pref.	1st	
2013–14	4	3ª	4th	
2014–15	4	3ª	15th	
2015–16	4	3ª	14th	
2016–17	4	3ª	16th	
2017–18	4	3ª	13th	
2018–19	4	3ª	13th	
2019–20	4	3ª	16th	
2020–21	4	3ª	10th / 5th	
2021–22	6	Reg. Pref.	12th	
2022–23	6	Reg. Pref.	12th	
2023–24	6	1ª FFCV	2nd	
2024–25	6	Lliga Com.	14th	
2025–26	7	1ª FFCV	10th	

Season	Tier	Division	Place	Copa del Rey
2026–27	7	1ª FFCV		

- 17 seasons in Tercera División
