= CF Montañesa =

Spanish football team

Montañesa
- Full name: Club de Futbol Montañesa
- Founded: 1927
- Ground: Nou Barris, Barcelona, Catalonia, Spain
- Capacity: 2,500
- Chairman: Emilio Llamas
- Manager: Dani Andreu
- League: Tercera Federación – Group 5
- 2025–26: Tercera Federación – Group 5, 11th of 18
- Website: www.cfmontanyesa.com
Home colours	Away colours

Club de Futbol Montañesa is a Spanish football team based in Barcelona in the district of Nou Barris, in the autonomous community of Catalonia. Founded in 1927, it plays in the Tercera Federación – Group 5, holding home games at Camp Municipal de Nou Barris, with a capacity of 2,500 seats.

== Season to season ==
Season	Tier	Division	Place	Copa del Rey
1971–72	7	3ª Reg.		
1972–73	7	3ª Reg.		
1973–74	7	3ª Reg.	2nd	
1974–75	6	2ª Reg.	6th	
1975–76	6	2ª Reg.	8th	
1976–77	6	2ª Reg.	1st	
1977–78	6	1ª Reg.	16th	
1978–79	7	2ª Reg.	1st	
1979–80	6	1ª Reg.	1st	
1980–81	5	Reg. Pref.	7th	
1981–82	5	Reg. Pref.	13th	
1982–83	5	Reg. Pref.	11th	
1983–84	5	Reg. Pref.	14th	
1984–85	5	Reg. Pref.	12th	
1985–86	5	Reg. Pref.	16th	
1986–87	6	1ª Reg.	1st	
1987–88	5	Reg. Pref.	4th	
1988–89	5	Reg. Pref.	5th	
1989–90	5	Reg. Pref.	14th	
1990–91	5	Reg. Pref.	5th	

Season	Tier	Division	Place	Copa del Rey
1991–92	5	1ª Cat.	15th	
1992–93	6	Pref. Terr.	6th	
1993–94	6	Pref. Terr.	10th	
1994–95	6	Pref. Terr.	8th	
1995–96	6	Pref. Terr.	5th	
1996–97	6	Pref. Terr.	10th	
1997–98	6	Pref. Terr.	15th	
1998–99	7	1ª Terr.	1st	
1999–2000	6	Pref. Terr.	14th	
2000–01	6	Pref. Terr.	6th	
2001–02	6	Pref. Terr.	8th	
2002–03	6	Pref. Terr.	11th	
2003–04	6	Pref. Terr.	2nd	
2004–05	5	1ª Cat.	11th	
2005–06	5	1ª Cat.	15th	
2006–07	5	1ª Cat.	17th	
2007–08	5	1ª Cat.	7th	
2008–09	5	1ª Cat.	7th	
2009–10	5	1ª Cat.	2nd	
2010–11	4	3ª	2nd	

Season	Tier	Division	Place	Copa del Rey
2011–12	4	3ª	15th	
2012–13	4	3ª	17th	
2013–14	4	3ª	2nd	
2014–15	4	3ª	13th	
2015–16	4	3ª	5th	
2016–17	4	3ª	17th	
2017–18	5	1ª Cat.	5th	
2018–19	5	1ª Cat.	6th	
2019–20	5	1ª Cat.	1st	
2020–21	4	3ª	11th / 10th	Preliminary
2021–22	6	1ª Cat.	1st	
2022–23	5	3ª Fed.	9th	
2023–24	5	3ª Fed.	9th	
2024–25	5	3ª Fed.	14th	
2025–26	5	3ª Fed.	11th	
2026–27	5	3ª Fed.		

- 8 seasons in Tercera División
- 5 seasons in Tercera Federación

== Current squad ==
As of 26 September 2025

Note: Flags indicate national team as defined under FIFA eligibility rules; some limited exceptions apply. Players may hold more than one non-FIFA nationality.

No.	Pos.	Nation	Player
1	GK	ESP	Eric Fernández
2	DF	ESP	Óscar Sierra
3	DF	ESP	Pau Rosales
4	DF	AZE	Ibrahim Ismayilov
5	DF	ESP	Guillem Pujol
7	DF	ESP	Jonathan Linares
8	MF	ESP	Miguel Martínez
9	FW	ESP	Elhadji Thiam
10	FW	ESP	Pablo Ufano
11	FW	ESP	Ayman Hasni
12	DF	ESP	Omar Lkoucha
13	GK	ESP	Josep García

No.	Pos.	Nation	Player
14	MF	ESP	Sergi Cadena
15	DF	ESP	Gerard Batalla
16	MF	ESP	Marc Gabaldón
17	MF	MAR	Abdeslam El Ouliad
19	FW	ESP	Mohamed Marsou
20	FW	ESP	Didac González
21	FW	ESP	Ayman Amhot
22	FW	POR	Júnior
24	MF	ESP	Pavel Kadochnikov
26	DF	ESP	Hugo Pérez
28	MF	ESP	Joan Páez (on loan from Sant Andreu)
