= As Somozas =

- Municipality
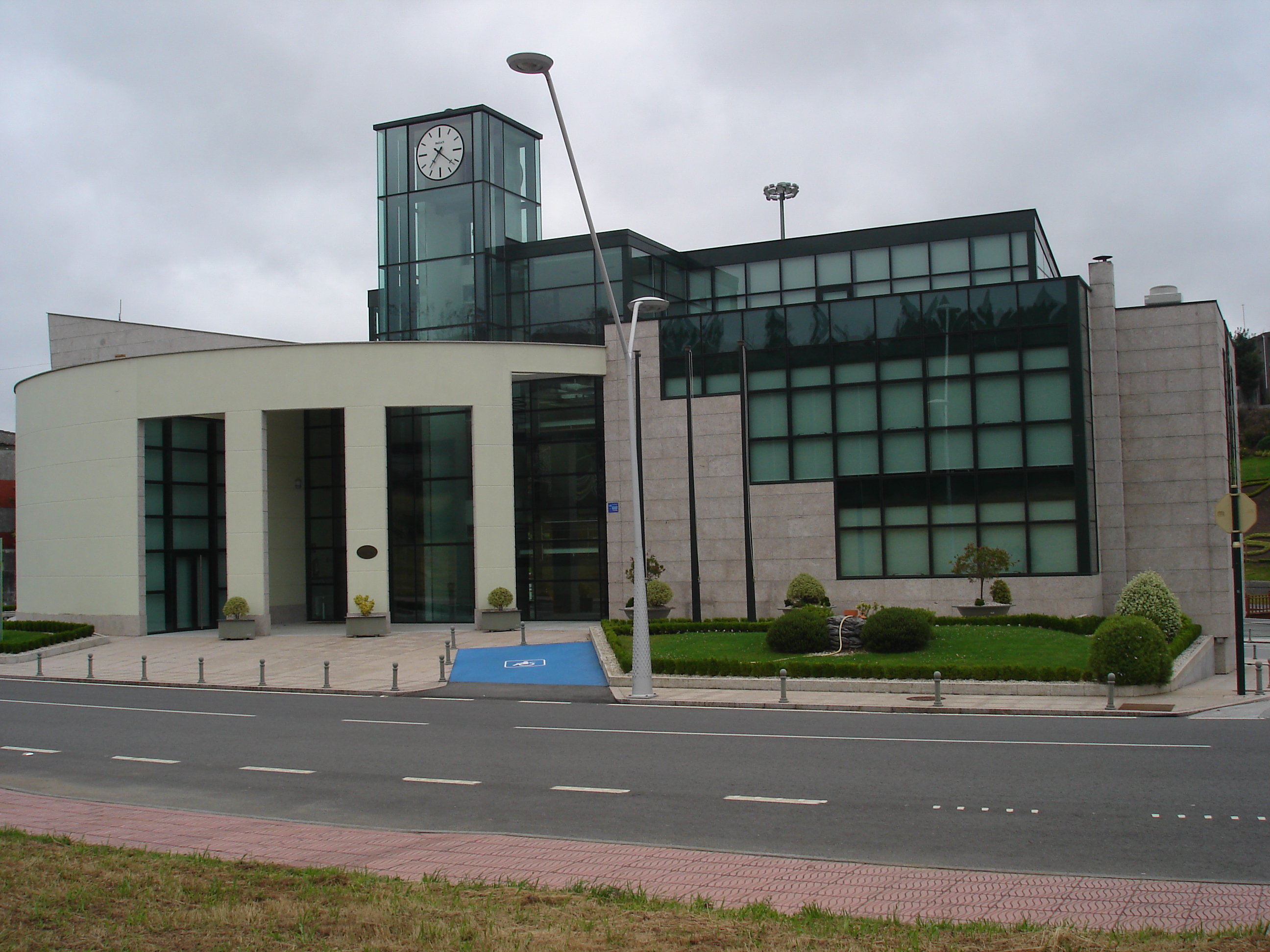

- Coat of arms

- Location in Spain.
- Coordinates: 43°32′09.79″N 7°55′27.62″W
- Country: Spain
- Autonomous community: Galicia
- Province: A Coruña
- Comarca: Ferrol

Government
  - Mayor: Manuel Candocia Ramos

Area
  - Total: 70.91 km^{2} (27.38 sq mi)

Population (2009)
  - Total: 1,382
  - Density: 19.49/km^{2} (50.48/sq mi)
- Demonym: Somocenses
- Time zone: UTC+1 (CET)
  - Summer (DST): UTC+2 (CEST)
- Website: Official website

As Somozas is a municipality in the province of A Coruña in the autonomous community of Galicia in northwestern Spain. It belongs to the comarca of Ferrol.

== See also ==
List of municipalities in A Coruña
