= 2025 Copa Federación de España =

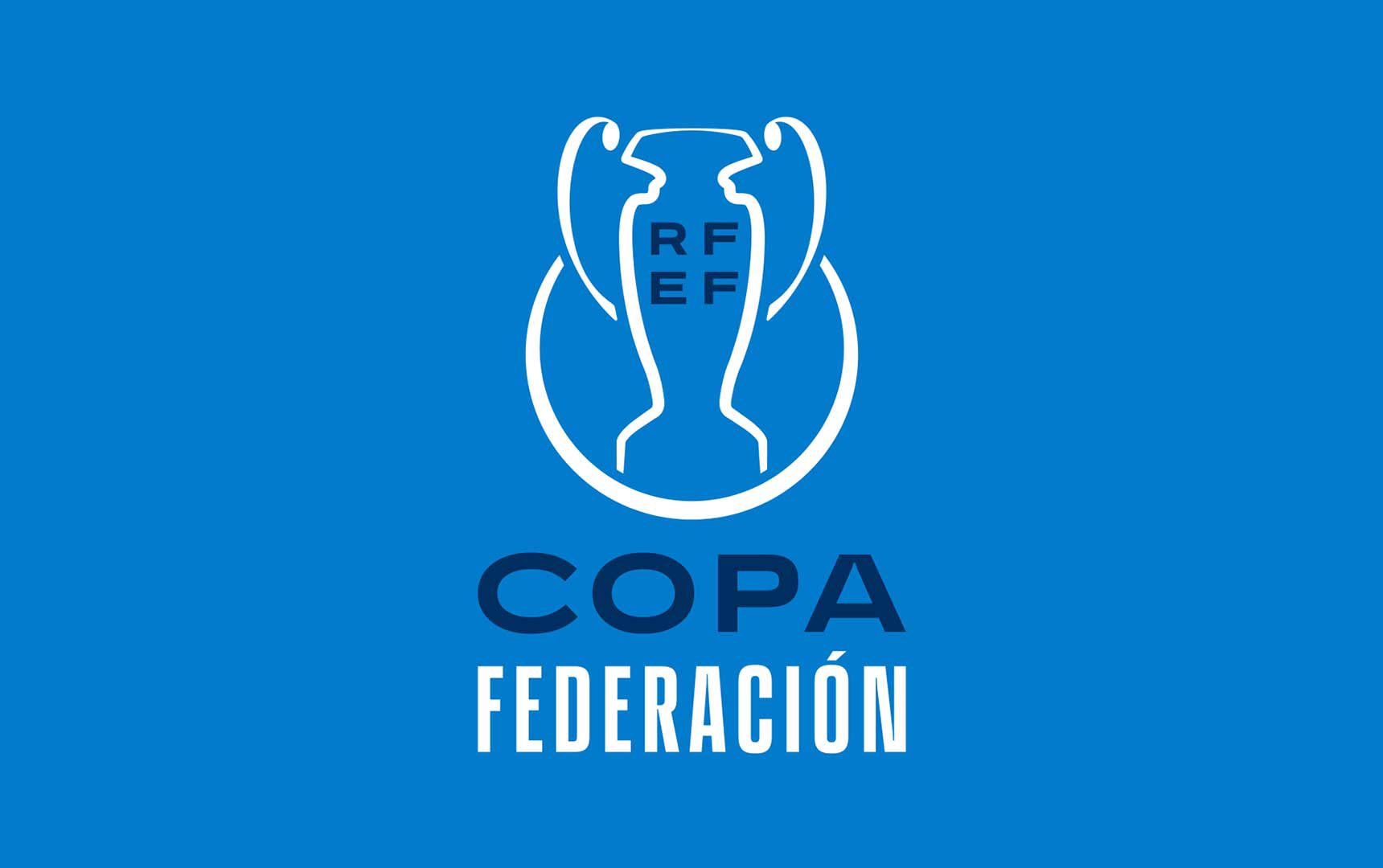

Tournament details
- Country: Spain
- Teams: 32 (in national phase) / 111 (in regional stages)

Final positions
- Champions: Ourense CF
- Runners-up: Orihuela

The 2025 Copa Federación de España is the 33rd edition of the Copa Federación de España, also known as Copa RFEF, a knockout competition for Spanish football clubs. The competition started in August with the first games of the Regional stages and ended 8 November with the final of the National tournament. Like previous years, the four semifinalists qualified for the Copa del Rey first round.

== Regional tournaments ==
=== Andalusia tournament ===
The Royal Andalusian Football Federation (RFAF) decided to create the 'Copa RFAF' in 2020. The finalists of this competition will be selected as the Andalusian representatives in the national phase of Copa RFEF. After the draw, Torre del Mar resigned its place and was replaced by Mijas-Las Lagunas.

Quarter-finals
17 and 20 August
Huétor Vega (5)	1	1	2
Huétor Tájar (5) (4–3 p)	1	1	2
16 and 20 August
Mijas-Las Lagunas (5)	2	1	3
Motril (5)	2	4	6
17 and 20 August
Pozoblanco (5) (3–1 p)	3	2	5
Utrera (5)	3	2	5
17 and 20 August
Bollullos (5)	4	0	4
Tomares (5)	0	3	3

Semi-finals
24 and 27 August
Huétor Tájar (5)	0	2	2
Motril (5)	0	1	1
24 and 27 August
Pozoblanco (5)	2	1	3
Bollullos (5) (3–2 p)	0	3	3

Final
31 August and 3 September
Huétor Tájar (5)	0	3	3
Bollullos (5)	0	2	2

==== Final ====
31 August	Huétor Tájar (5)	0–0	Bollullos (5)	Huétor-Tájar
19:00		Report		Stadium: Miguel Moranto; Attendance: 200; Referee: Jorge González Sánchez

3 September	Bollullos (5)	2–3	Huétor Tájar (5)	Bollullos Par del Condado
19:00	Alejandro Raposo 8'; Fernando Carrasco 64'	Report	Manu Daza 75' (pen.); Joaquín Amador 84'; Alberto Borrego 86'	Stadium: Eloy Ávila Cano; Attendance: 400; Referee: Rafael Soler Romero

=== Aragon tournament ===
Five teams joined the tournament: At. Monzón (5), Binéfar (5), Calamocha (5), La Almunia (5) and Utrillas (5). The teams were divided into two groups: north and south.

==== North group ====
15 August	At. Monzón (5)	3–1	Binéfar (5)

24 August	Binéfar (5)	1–1	At. Monzón (5)

==== South group ====
Pos	Team	Pld	W	D	L	GF	GA	GD	Pts	Qualification	CAL	LAL	UTR
1	Calamocha	2	2	0	0	4	1	+3	6	Qualification to the Final	—	3–1	-
2	La Almunia	2	1	0	1	4	3	+1	3		-	—	3–0
3	Utrillas	2	0	0	2	0	4	−4	0		0–1	-	—

Source: Federación Aragonesa de Fútbol

==== Final ====
30 August	At. Monzón (5)	3–1	Calamocha (5)	Monzón
19:00	Mohamed Abouhafs El Fad 49'; Youssef Ouakkati 74'; Pablo Bernárdez 84'	Report	Celesdonio Oyono Mate 23'	Stadium: Isidro Calderón; Referee: Marcos Ramos Larraz

=== Asturias tournament ===
12 teams joined the tournament. The draw was made 7 July and the tournament started 17 August.

Pot 1	Pot 2	Pot 3
Marino Luanco (4); Llanera (5); Lealtad (4); Mosconia (5)	L'Entregu (5); Praviano (5); Colunga (5); Tuilla (5)	Avilés Stadium (5); Ceares (5); Titánico (5); San Martín (5)

==== Group stage ====
===== Group A =====
Pos	Team	Pld	W	D	L	GF	GA	GD	Pts	Qualification	MAR	SMA	ENT
1	Marino Luanco	2	2	0	0	4	1	+3	6	Qualification to semifinals	—	2–1	—
2	San Martín	2	1	0	1	3	3	0	3		—	—	2–1
3	L'Entregu	2	0	0	2	1	4	−3	0		0–2	—	—

Source: Fútbol Asturiano

===== Group B =====
Pos	Team	Pld	W	D	L	GF	GA	GD	Pts	Qualification	LEA	TIT	COL
1	Lealtad	2	2	0	0	7	2	+5	6	Qualification to semifinals	—	3–0	—
2	Titánico	2	1	0	1	3	5	−2	3		—	—	3–2
3	Colunga	2	0	0	2	4	7	−3	0		2–4	—	—

Source: Fútbol Asturiano

===== Group C =====
Pos	Team	Pld	W	D	L	GF	GA	GD	Pts	Qualification	MOS	CEA	PRA
1	Mosconia	2	1	1	0	4	1	+3	4	Qualification to semifinals	—	3–0	—
2	Ceares	2	1	0	1	2	4	−2	3		—	—	2–1
3	Praviano	2	0	1	1	2	3	−1	1		1–1	—	—

Source: Fútbol Asturiano

===== Group D =====
Pos	Team	Pld	W	D	L	GF	GA	GD	Pts	Qualification	LLA	TUI	AVI
1	Llanera	2	2	0	0	3	0	+3	6	Qualification to semifinals	—	—	2–0
2	Tuilla	2	1	0	1	1	1	0	3		0–1	—	—
3	Avilés Stadium	2	0	0	2	0	3	−3	0		—	0–1	—

Source: Fútbol Asturiano

==== Knockout stage ====
The knockout stage matches were played at Marqués de La Vega de Anzo Stadium, in Grado.

Semi-finals
27 August – Grado
Marino Luanco (4)	1
Lealtad (4)	0
28 August – Grado
Mosconia (5) (p)	1 (3)
Llanera (5)	1 (2)

Final
31 August – Grado
Marino Luanco (4)	1
Mosconia (5)	0

==== Final ====
31 August	Marino Luanco (4)	1–0	Mosconia (5)	Grado
19:00	Tito Leyva 34'	Report		Stadium: Marqués de La Vega de Anzo; Attendance: 800; Referee: Juan González Suárez

=== Balearic Islands tournament ===
Four teams joined the tournament.

Semi-finals
24 August
Andratx (4)	1
Porreres (4)	0
23 August
CD Ibiza (4) (p)	2 (4)
Peña Deportiva (5)	2 (3)

Final
30 August
Andratx (4)	0
CD Ibiza (4)	1

==== Final ====
30 August	Andratx (4)	0–1	CD Ibiza (4)	Andratx
18:00	Pablo Gálvez (penalty missed) 90+5'	Report	Alejandro Sánchez 22'	Stadium: Sa Plana; Referee: Nil Cubas Torres

=== Basque Country tournament ===
7 teams joined the tournament: Amorebieta (4), Derio (5), Gernika (4), Real Unión (4), San Ignacio (5), Santurtzi (5) and Sestao River (4). Draw was made 4 July.

Quarter-finals
13 August
Sestao River (4) (a.e.t.)	1
Real Unión (4)	0
13 August
Amorebieta (4)	3
San Ignacio (5)	1
13 August
Derio (5) (p)	0 (4)
Santurtzi (5)	0 (3)

Semi-finals
20 August
Sestao River (4)	0 (3)
Amorebieta (4) (p)	0 (4)
20 August
Derio (5)	2
Gernika (4) (a.e.t.)	3

Final
27 August
Amorebieta (4)	3
Gernika (4)	1

==== Final ====
27 August	Amorebieta (4)	3–1	Gernika (4)	Amorebieta-Etxano
20:00	Aitor Torrico 41'; Mikel Arzalluz 48'; Gonzalo Zorrilla 57' (pen.)	Report	Antton Fruniz 88'	Stadium: Urritxe; Referee: Sergio Fontecha Márquez

=== Canary Islands tournament ===
Four teams joined the tournament.

Semi-finals
26 August
Telde (5) (a.e.t.)	2
Unión Viera (6)	1
27 August
Laguna (6) (a.e.t.)	4
Mensajero (5)	3

Final
2 September
Telde (5)	1 (3)
Laguna (6) (a.e.t.) (p)	1 (4)

==== Final ====
2 September	Telde (5)	1–1 (3–4 p)	Laguna (6)	Telde
16:00		Report		Stadium: Estadio Municipal Pablo Hernández Morales; Attendance: 420; Referee: Vicente Omar González Quesada

=== Cantabria tournament ===
Eight teams joined the tournament.

Quarter-finals
16 August
Escobedo (5)	3
Bezana (5)	1
16 August
Atlético Albericia (5)	2
Cayón (5)	0
16 August
Gimnástica (5) (p)	2 (5)
Vimenor (5)	2 (4)
17 August
Laredo (5)	1
Castro (5)	0

Semi-finals
23 August - Bezana
Escobedo (5)	5
Atlético Albericia (5)	2
24 August - Bezana
Gimnástica Torrelavega (5)	0 (3)
Laredo (5) (p)	0 (5)

Final
31 August - Bezana
Escobedo (5)	0
Laredo (5)	2

==== Final ====
31 August	Escobedo (5)	0–2	Laredo (5)	Bezana
19:00		Report	Oliver Helguera 15'; El Hadji Ndiaga Gning 79'	Stadium: Municipal; Referee: Pablo Aja González

=== Castile and León tournament ===
7 teams joined the tournament: Guijuelo (5), Palencia (5), Salamanca (4), Santa Marta (5), Unionistas (3), Villaralbo (5) and Zamora (3). The draw was made 11 July and the tournament started 2 August.

==== Group A ====
Pos	Team	Pld	W	D	L	GF	GA	GD	Pts	Qualification	UNI	GUI	SAL	MAR
1	Unionistas	3	2	1	0	7	1	+6	7	Qualification to the final	—	—	2–0	—
2	Guijuelo	3	1	2	0	3	2	+1	5		1–1	—	—	—
3	Salamanca	3	1	1	1	3	4	−1	4		—	1–1	—	2–1
4	Santa Marta	3	0	0	3	1	7	−6	0		0–4	0–1	—	—

Source: Real Federación de Castilla y León de Fútbol

==== Group B ====
Pos	Team	Pld	W	D	L	GF	GA	GD	Pts	Qualification	ZAM	PAL	VIL
1	Zamora	2	2	0	0	5	1	+4	6	Qualification to the final	—	—	—
2	Palencia	2	0	1	1	2	4	−2	1		1–3	—	1–1
3	Villaralbo	2	0	1	1	1	3	−2	1		0–2	—	—

Source: Real Federación de Castilla y León de Fútbol

==== Final ====
24 August	Zamora (3)	1–0	Unionistas (3)	Benavente
19:30	Josh Farrell 58'	Report		Stadium: Luciano Rubio; Referee: Agustín Valverde Refoyo

=== Castile-La Mancha tournament ===
Eight teams joined the Trofeo Junta de Comunidades de Castilla-La Mancha acting as qualifying tournament.

Quarter-finals
9 August
Illescas (5)	1 (3)
Villacañas (5) (p)	1 (4)
9 August
Toledo (5)	6
Cazalegas (5)	0
9 August
Tarancón (5)	3
Conquense (4)	0
10 August
Huracán Balazote (5)	0
Socuéllamos (4)	2

Semi-finals
16 August
Villacañas (5)	0
Toledo (5)	1
13 August
Tarancón (5)	0 (3)
Socuéllamos (4) (p)	0 (5)

Final
23 August
Toledo (5)	1
Socuéllamos (4)	0

==== Final ====
23 August	Toledo (5)	1–0	Socuéllamos (4)	Toledo
20:00	José Luis Friaza 43' (pen.)	Report		Stadium: Salto del Caballo; Referee: Sebastián Roberto Pricopi Gogu

=== Catalonia tournament ===
Cornellà (5) and Tona (5) joined the tournament.

23 August	Cornellà (5)	0–2	Tona (5)	Cornellà de Llobregat
18:00		Report	Roger Barnils 11'; Joan Martínez 68'	Stadium: Municipal; Referee: Marcos Fernández Quintero

=== Ceuta tournament ===
Ceuta 6 de Junio was directly selected by Real Federación de Fútbol de Ceuta due to sporting merits.

=== Extremadura tournament ===
Seven teams joined the tournament: At. Pueblonuevo (5), Cabeza del Buey (5), Gévora (5), Montehermoso (5), Moralo (5), Santa Amalia (5) and Villanovense (5).

Quarter-finals
17 August
Montehermoso (5)	0 (2)
Moralo (5) (p)	0 (4)
17 August
Gévora (5) (p)	1 (3)
At. Pueblonuevo (5)	1 (1)
17 August
Santa Amalia (5) (p)	0 (3)
Villanovense (5)	0 (1)

Semi-finals
24 August
Moralo (5)	1
Gévora (5)	0
24 August
Cabeza del Buey (5)	3
Santa Amalia (5)	0

Final
31 August - Cáceres
Moralo (5) (p)	1 (4)
Cabeza del Buey (5)	1 (2)

==== Final ====
31 August	Moralo (5)	1–1 (4–2 p)	Cabeza del Buey (5)	Cáceres
20:00	Robson William Silva 'Robinho' 10'	Report	Jhoan Cadavid 21' (pen.)	Stadium: Manuel Sánchez Delgado; Referee: Hugo Novella Navalón

=== Galicia tournament ===
12 teams joined the tournament. The draw was made 8 July.

First Round
9 August
Arosa (5)	1
Alondras (5)	0
3 August
Gran Peña (5)	0
Coruxo (4)	2
6 August
Sarriana (4)	0
Ourense CF (3)	2
7 August
Barbadás (5)	0
Arenteiro (3)	2

Quarter-finals
13 August
Arosa (5) (p)	0 (5)
Coruxo (4)	0 (4)
13 August
Noia (5)	1 (2)
Boiro (5) (p)	1 (4)
13 August
Racing Villalbés (5)	0
Ourense CF (3)	3
13 August
Silva (5)	0 (3)
Arenteiro (3) (p)	0 (4)

Semi-finals
20 August
Arosa (5)	2
Boiro (5)	1
20 August
Ourense CF (3)	2
Arenteiro (3)	0

Final
24 August
Arosa (5)	1 (2)
Ourense CF (3) (p)	1 (4)

==== Final ====
24 August	Arosa (5)	1–1 (2–4 p)	Ourense CF (3)	Vilagarcía de Arousa
19:00				Stadium: A Lomba

=== La Rioja tournament ===
Three teams joined the tournament. The draw was made 23 July.

Semi-finals
24 August
Oyonesa (5)	1
La Calzada (5)	0

Final
30 August - Pradejón
Oyonesa (5)	1 (2)
Alfaro (4) (p)	1 (4)

==== Final ====
30 August	Oyonesa (5)	1–1 (2–4 p)	Alfaro (4)	Pradejón
19:00				Stadium: Municipal

=== Madrid tournament ===
8 teams joined the tournament: Las Rozas (5), México FC (5), Móstoles URJC (5), Parla (5), San Sebastián de los Reyes (4), Torrejón (5), Unión Adarve (5) and Villaverde San Andrés (5). The draw was made 10 July and tournament started 13 August.

==== Group A ====
Pos	Team	Pld	W	D	L	GF	GA	GD	Pts	Qualification	SAN	ADA	ROZ	MEX
1	San Sebastián de los Reyes	3	1	2	0	5	2	+3	5	Qualification to the final	—	—	—	3–0
2	Unión Adarve	3	1	2	0	4	1	+3	5		1–1	—	3–0	—
3	Las Rozas	3	1	1	1	4	5	−1	4		1–1	—	—	—
4	México FC	3	0	1	2	1	6	−5	1		—	0–0	1–3	—

Source: Real Federación de Fútbol de Madrid

==== Group B ====
Pos	Team	Pld	W	D	L	GF	GA	GD	Pts	Qualification	MOS	VIL	PAR	TOR
1	Móstoles URJC	3	2	1	0	4	0	+4	7	Qualification to the final	—	0–0	—	3–0
2	Villaverde San Andrés	3	0	3	0	0	0	0	3		—	—	0–0	0–0
3	Parla	3	0	2	1	1	2	−1	2		0–1	—	—	—
4	Torrejón	3	0	2	1	1	4	−3	2		—	—	1–1	—

Source: Real Federación de Fútbol de Madrid

==== Final ====
24 August	San Sebastián de los Reyes (4)	2–1	Móstoles URJC (5)	Madrid
11:00	Christian Díaz 3'; Jacobo de Oro 19'	Report	Jorge Pradillos 51'	Stadium: Ernesto Cotorruelo; Referee: David Sánchez Jiménez

=== Melilla tournament ===
Melilla was directly selected by Real Federación Melillense de Fútbol due to sporting merits.

=== Murcia tournament ===
8 teams joined the tournament: Águilas (4), Mazarrón (5), Minera (4), Minerva (5), Muleño (5), Olímpico Totana (5), Santomera (5) and Yeclano (4). The draw was made 21 July.

Quarter-finals
24 August
Minerva (5)	2
Muleño (5)	0
23 August
Águilas (4)	0
Minera (4)	1
24 August
Mazarrón (5) (p)	1 (5)
Olímpico Totana (5)	1 (4)
23 August
Yeclano (4)	6
Santomera (5)	0

Semi-finals
27 August
Minerva (5)	1
Minera (4)	2
27 August
Mazarrón (5)	1
Yeclano (4)	3

Semi-finals
31 August
Minera (4)	2
Yeclano (4)	1

==== Final ====
31 August	Minera (4)	2–1	Yeclano (4)	Llano del Beal
11:00				Stadium: Ángel Celdrán

=== Navarre tournament ===
Four teams joined the tournament. The draw was made 4 July.

Semi-finals
27 August
Tudelano (4)	4
Cortes (5)	0
27 August
Txantrea (5) (a.e.t.) (p)	1 (3)
Peña Sport (5)	1 (1)

Final
31 August
Tudelano (4)	3
Txantrea (5)	0

==== Final ====
31 August	Tudelano (4)	3–0	Txantrea (5)	Tudela
19:00	Iñigo Alayeto 42'; Guillermo Alonso 67'; Nowend Yenrique Lorenzo 77'	Report		Stadium: Ciudad de Tudela; Referee: Álvaro del Valle Rodríguez

=== Valencian Community tournament ===
Intercity (4) and Orihuela (4) joined the tournament.

23 August	Intercity (4)	1–6	Orihuela (4)	Alicante
20:30	Diego Royo 90+2'	Report	Joan Monterde 13'; Manuel León 37' (pen.); Camilo Mozo 52'; José Alonso Lara 56'; Adnane Bensaad 83'; Javier Solsona 90+3'	Stadium: Estadio Antonio Solana; Referee: Salvador Carrillo García

30 August	Orihuela (4)	0–0	Intercity (4)	Orihuela
20:30		Report		Stadium: Los Arcos; Referee: Manuel José Muñoz Mendiola

== National phase ==
The national phase will start 10 September with 32 teams (20 winners of the Regional Tournaments, the best 5 teams from 2024–25 Segunda Federación not yet qualified for the 2025–26 Copa del Rey and the best 7 teams from the 2024–25 Tercera Federación not yet qualified for the 2025–26 Copa del Rey). The four semi-finalists will qualify for the 2025–26 Copa del Rey first round.

=== Qualified teams ===
- 5 best teams from 2024–25 Segunda Federación not yet qualified to 2025–26 Copa del Rey

- (Galicia (Spain)) Bergantiños (4)
- (Extremadura) Coria (4)
- (Aragon) Ejea (4)
- (Catalonia) Terrassa (4)
- (Andalusia) Xerez (4)

- 7 best teams from 2024–25 Tercera Federación not yet qualified to 2025–26 Copa del Rey

- (Catalonia) Atlètic Lleida (4)
- (Asturias) Covadonga (5)
- (Galicia (Spain)) Estradense (5)
- (Balearic Islands) Formentera (5)
- (Extremadura) Jaraíz (5)
- (Region of Murcia) Unión Molinense (5)
- (La Rioja) Varea (5)

- Winners of Autonomous Communities tournaments

- (La Rioja) Alfaro (4)
- (Basque Country (autonomous community)) Amorebieta (4)
- (Aragon) At. Monzón (5)
- (Andalusia) Bollullos (5)
- (Balearic Islands) CD Ibiza (4)
- Ceuta 6 de Junio (6)
- (Andalusia) Huétor Tájar (5)
- (Canary Islands) Laguna (6)
- (Cantabria) Laredo (5)
- (Asturias) Marino Luanco (4)
- Melilla (4)
- (Region of Murcia) Minera (4)
- (Extremadura) Moralo (5)
- (Valencian Community) Orihuela (4)
- (Galicia (Spain)) Ourense CF (3)
- (Community of Madrid) San Sebastián de los Reyes (4)
- (Castilla–La Mancha) Toledo (5)
- (Catalonia) Tona (5)
- (Navarre) Tudelano (4)
- (Castile and León) Zamora (3)

=== Draw ===
The draw was made at the RFEF headquarters on 3 September. The teams were divided into four pots based on geographical criteria. Each pot will be played independently until the semi-finals. As a new feature, this season there will be a draw for each qualifying round until the final.

Pot A	Pot B	Pot C	Pot D
(Asturias) Covadonga (5) (Asturias) Marino Luanco (4) (Basque Country (autonomous community)) Amorebieta (4) (Cantabria) Laredo (5) (Castile and León) Zamora (3) (Galicia (Spain)) Bergantiños (4) (Galicia (Spain)) Estradense (5) (Galicia (Spain)) Ourense CF (3)	(Aragon) At. Monzón (5) (Aragon) Ejea (4) (Balearic Islands) CD Ibiza (4) (Balearic Islands) Formentera (5) (Catalonia) Atlètic Lleida (4) (Catalonia) Terrassa (4) (Catalonia) Tona (5) (Navarre) Tudelano (4)	(Canary Islands) Laguna (6) (Castilla–La Mancha) Toledo (5) (Extremadura) Coria (4) (Extremadura) Jaraíz (5) (Extremadura) Moralo (5) (La Rioja) Alfaro (4) (La Rioja) Varea (5) (Community of Madrid) San Sebastián de los Reyes (4)	(Andalusia) Bollullos (5) (Andalusia) Huétor Tájar (5) (Andalusia) Xerez (4); Ceuta 6 de Junio (6); Melilla (4) (Region of Murcia) Minera (4) (Region of Murcia) Unión Molinense (5) (Valencian Community) Orihuela (4)

=== Round of 32 ===
Pot A

10 September	Zamora (3)	4–1	Amorebieta (4)	Zamora
20:30	Álvaro Romero 8'; Jaime Sancho 41'; Miquel Codina 45+2'; Josh Farrell 64'	Report	Hodei Rodríguez (penalty missed) 4'; Javier Elías 76'	Stadium: Ruta de la Plata; Referee: Alberto Lago Barreiro (Galicia)

10 September	Estradense (5)	2–1	Covadonga (5)	A Estrada
20:30	Miguel Fernández 'Migui' 6', 28'	Report	Míchel Secades 49'	Stadium: Municipal; Referee: Omar Álvarez Rodríguez (Castile and León)

10 September	Laredo (5)	1–5	Ourense CF (3)	Laredo
20:00	Miguel Prado 53' (o.g.)	Report	Iker Torre 12' (o.g.); Kensly Vázquez 21' (pen.); Miguel Prado 47'; Omar Ouhdadi 51'; Aitor Aranzabe 89'	Stadium: San Lorenzo; Referee: Diego Sarabia Caro (La Rioja)

10 September	Bergantiños (4)	4–2 (a.e.t.)	Marino Luanco (4)	Carballo
19:00	Isma Cerro 31' (pen.); Fito 59'; Marc Marruecos 101'; Darío Germil 109'	Report	Tomás Fuentes 35', 89'	Stadium: As Eiroas; Referee: Ángel Manso Rojas (Castile and León)

Pot B

10 September	Formentera (5)	0–0 (a.e.t.) (4–2 p)	CD Ibiza (4)	Sant Francesc Xavier
19:00		Report		Stadium: Municipal; Referee: Sergi Carrero Romera (Catalonia)

10 September	Ejea (4)	2–0 (a.e.t.)	Tona (5)	Ejea de los Caballeros
19:30	David Álvarez 100', 102'	Report		Stadium: Luchán; Referee: Fermín Rodríguez Pérez (Navarre)

10 September	Terrassa (4)	4–0	At. Monzón (5)	Terrassa
19:00				Stadium: Estadi Olímpic

10 September	Atlètic Lleida (4)	1–0	Tudelano (4)	Lleida
20:00				Stadium: Camp d'Esports

Pot C

10 September	San Sebastián de los Reyes (4)	0–0 (a.e.t.) (4–2 p)	Alfaro (4)	San Sebastián de los Reyes
20:30				Stadium: Nuevo Matapiñonera

10 September	Jaraíz (5)	2–2 (a.e.t.) (2–4 p)	Coria (4)	Jaraíz de la Vera
20:30				Stadium: Municipal

10 September	Laguna (6)	1–2 (a.e.t.)	Toledo (5)	San Cristóbal de La Laguna
19:00 WET				Stadium: Francisco Peraza

10 September	Varea (5)	2–0	Moralo (5)	Varea
20:00				Stadium: Municipal

Pot D

10 September	Ceuta 6 de Junio (6)	2–5	Orihuela (4)	Ceuta
19:00				Stadium: José Martínez Pirri

10 September	Unión Molinense (5)	2–0	Xerez (4)	Molina de Segura
20:00				Stadium: Sánchez Cánovas

10 September	Huétor Tájar (5)	1–1 (a.e.t.) (4–2 p)	Bollullos (5)	Huétor-Tájar
20:00				Stadium: Miguel Moranto

10 September	Minera (4)	3–0	Melilla (4)	Llano del Beal
17:30	Manu Galán 30'; Rubén Mesa 60'; Javier Vera 74'			Stadium: Ángel Celdrán

=== Round of 16 ===
The draw was made at the RFEF headquarters on 11 September.

Pot A

17 September	Ourense CF (3)	2–1	Zamora (3)	Ourense
20:00				Stadium: O Couto

17 September	Bergantiños (4)	2–1 (a.e.t.)	Estradense (5)	Carballo
20:00				Stadium: As Eiroas

Pot B

17 September	Atlètic Lleida (4)	6–1	Formentera (5)	Lleida
20:00				Stadium: Camp d'Esports

17 September	Terrassa (4)	0–1	Ejea (4)	Terrassa
19:00				Stadium: Estadi Olímpic

Pot C

17 September	Varea (5)	1–2	San Sebastián de los Reyes (4)	Varea
20:00				Stadium: Municipal de Varea

17 September	Toledo (5)	1–0	Coria (4)	Toledo
20:00				Stadium: Salto del Caballo

Pot D

17 September	Orihuela (4)	3–0	Huétor Tájar (5)	Orihuela
20:00				Stadium: Los Arcos

17 September	Minera (4)	3–0 (a.e.t.)	Unión Molinense (5)	Llano del Beal
17:30				Stadium: Ángel Celdrán

=== Quarter-finals ===
The draw of Quarter-finals, Semi-finals and final was made at the RFEF headquarters on 18 September. Winners of Quarter-finals qualified to the 2025–26 Copa del Rey first round.

Pot A

1 October	Bergantiños (4)	0–2	Ourense CF (3)	Carballo
19:00		Report	Amin Bouzaig 59', 68'	Stadium: As Eiroas; Referee: Juan Francisco Morato Vega (Asturias)

Pot B

1 October	Atlètic Lleida (4)	2–1 (a.e.t.)	Ejea (4)	Lleida
19:00	David Chica 66' (o.g.); Juan Cruz 120'	Report	Sergio Chica 80' (pen.)	Stadium: Camp d'Esports; Referee: Goiatz Markotegi Latorre (Navarre)

Pot C

1 October	San Sebastián de los Reyes (4)	0–1	Toledo (5)	San Sebastián de los Reyes
20:00		Report	Neco Rubayo 77'	Stadium: Nuevo Matapiñonera; Attendance: 1.200; Referee: Johan Gonzalez Rodriguez (Canary Islands)

Pot D

1 October	Minera (4)	0–0 (2–3 p)	Orihuela (4)	Llano del Beal
17:15		Report		Stadium: Ángel Celdrán; Referee: Jaime Muñoz Moreno (Madrid)

=== Semi-finals ===
15 October	Atlètic Lleida (4)	3–3 (4–5 p)	Ourense CF (3)	Lleida
19:00	Boris Garrós 53', 63'; Carlos Mas 97'	Report	Amin 46', 69'; Jerin 65'	Stadium: Camp d'Esports

15 October	Toledo (5)	2–4 (a.e.t.)	Orihuela (4)	Toledo
20:00	Chupi 8'; Nader Ghabbour 55'	Report	Guille Montesinos 45'; Antonio Pérez 47'; Javier Solsona 91', 110'	Stadium: Salto del Caballo

=== Final ===
8 November	Ourense CF (3)	3–0	Orihuela (4)	Ourense
	Amin Abaradan 13', 82', 85'	Report		Stadium: O Couto; Referee: Gaizka Altuna
