= List of football clubs in Spain =

This is a list of men's association football clubs in Spain. Currently the governing body of football in Spain is the Royal Spanish Football Federation (RFEF), which is in charge of its national teams and its leagues, with the highest one being La Liga. RFEF was founded in 1909 and is a member of both FIFA and UEFA.

== La Liga ==
=== 2026–27 La Liga clubs ===
Club	Founded	Home city	Stadium	Finishing position last season	First season in division	In division since
Alavés	1921	Vitoria-Gasteiz	Mendizorrotza	14th	1930–31	2023–24
Athletic Bilbao (Note: Played every season in La Liga.)	1898	Bilbao	San Mamés	12th	1929	1929
Atlético Madrid	1903	Madrid	Metropolitano	4th	1929	2002–03
Barcelona	1899	Barcelona	Camp Nou	1st	1929	1929
Celta Vigo	1923	Vigo	Balaídos	6th	1939–40	2012–13
Deportivo A Coruña	1906	A Coruña	Riazor	2nd in Segunda División	1941–42	2026–27
Elche	1923	Elche	Martínez Valero	15th	1959–60	2025–26
Espanyol	1900	Barcelona	RCDE Stadium	11th	1929	2024–25
Getafe	1983	Getafe	Coliseum	7th	2004–05	2017–18
Levante	1909	Valencia	Ciutat de València	16th	1963–64	2025–26
Málaga	1948	Málaga	La Rosaleda	4th in Segunda División	1999–2000	2026–27
Osasuna	1920	Pamplona	El Sadar	17th	1935–36	2019–20
Racing Santander	1913	Santander	El Sardinero	1st in Segunda División	1940–41	2026–27
Rayo Vallecano	1924	Madrid	Vallecas	8th	1977–78	2021–22
Real Betis	1907	Seville	Benito Villamarín	5th	1932–33	2015–16
Real Madrid	1902	Madrid	Bernabéu	2nd	1929	1929
Real Sociedad	1909	San Sebastián	Anoeta	10th	1929	2010–11
Sevilla	1890	Seville	Ramón Sánchez Pizjuán	13th	1934–35	2001–02
Valencia	1919	Valencia	Mestalla	9th	1931–32	1987–88
Villarreal	1923	Villarreal	Estadio de la Cerámica	3rd	1998–99	2013–14

== Segunda División ==
=== 2026–27 Segunda División clubs ===
Club	Founded	Home city	Stadium	Finishing position last season	First season in division	In division since
Albacete	1939	Albacete	Carlos Belmonte	12th	1949–50	2022–23
Almería (Note: The former Agrupación Deportiva Almería played in Segunda División for the first time in the 1978–79 season. The current Unión Deportiva Almería did it in the 1995–96 season.)	1989	Almería	Power Horse Stadium	3rd	1995–96	2024–25
FC Andorra (Note: Not to be confused with Andorra CF.)	1942	Andorra la Vella (Note: Located in Andorra.)	Estadi Nacional	13th	2022–23	2025–26
Burgos (Note: The original Burgos CF with the same exact name played in Segunda División for the first time in the 1952–53 season. After its dissolvement in 1983 the current Burgos CF was founded in its place and played its first Segunda División campaign in the 2001–02 season.)	1985	Burgos	El Plantío	7th	2001–02	2021–22
Cádiz	1910	Cádiz	Nuevo Mirandilla	18th	1935–36	2024–25
Castellón	1922	Castellón de la Plana	Castàlia	6th	1930–31	2024–25
Celta Fortuna	1927	Vigo	Balaídos	2nd in 1ª Federación - Group 1	2026–27	2026–27
Ceuta	1956	Ceuta	Alfonso Murube	11th	1956–57	2025–26
Córdoba	1954	Córdoba	Nuevo Arcángel	9th	1956–57	2024–25
Eibar	1940	Eibar	Ipurua	8th	1953–54	2021–22
Eldense	1921	Elda	Pepico Amat	1st in 1ª Federación - Group 2	1956–57	2026–27
Girona	1930	Girona	Montilivi	19th in LaLiga	1934–35	2026–27
Granada	1931	Granada	Nuevo Los Cármenes	14th	1934–35	2024–25
Las Palmas	1949	Las Palmas	Gran Canaria	5th	1950–51	2025–26
Leganés	1928	Leganés	Butarque	16th	1993–94	2025–26
Mallorca	1916	Palma de Mallorca	Son Moix	18th in LaLiga	1939–40	2026–27
Oviedo	1926	Oviedo	Carlos Tartiere	20th in LaLiga	1929	2026–27
Real Sociedad B	1955	San Sebastián	José Luis Orbegozo	15th	1960–61	2025–26
Sabadell	1903	Sabadell	Nova Creu Alta	2nd in 1ª Federación - Group 2	1933–34	2026–27
Sporting Gijón	1905	Gijón	El Molinón	10th	1929	2017–18
Tenerife	1922	Santa Cruz de Tenerife	Heliodoro Rodríguez López	1st in 1ª Federación - Group 1	1953–54	2026–27
Valladolid	1928	Valladolid	José Zorrilla	17th	1934–35	2025–26

== Primera Federación ==
=== 2026–27 Primera Federación clubs ===
Club	Founded	Home city	Stadium	Finishing position last season	In division since
Group 1
Arenas	1909	Getxo	Gobela	11th	2025–26
Avilés Industrial	1903	Avilés	Román Suárez Puerta	14th	2025–26
Barakaldo	1917	Barakaldo	Lasesarre	7th	2024–25
Bilbao Athletic	1964	Bilbao	Lezama	13th	2024–25
Cacereño	1919	Cáceres	Príncipe Felipe	15th	2025–26
Coria	1960	Coria	La Isla	5th in 2ª Federación - Group 5	2026–27
Cultural Leonesa	1923	León	Reino de León	21st in Segunda División	2026–27
Deportivo Fabril	1914	Abegondo	Cidade Deportiva	1st in 2ª Federación - Group 1	2026–27
Extremadura	2022	Almendralejo	Francisco de la Hera	1st in 2ª Federación - Group 4	2026–27
UD Logroñés (Note: Not to be confused with SD Logroñés.)	2009	Logroño	Las Gaunas	3rd in 2ª Federación - Group 2	2026–27
Lugo	1953	Lugo	Anxo Carro	9th	2023–24
Mérida	2013	Mérida	Romano	10th	2022–23
Mirandés	1927	Miranda de Ebro	Anduva	19th in Segunda División	2026–27
UD Ourense (Note: Not to be confused with Ourense CF.)	2014	Ourense	O Couto	4th in 2ª Federación - Group 1	2026–27
Ponferradina	1922	Ponferrada	El Toralín	4th	2023–24
Pontevedra	1941	Pontevedra	Pasarón	6th	2025–26
Racing Ferrol	1919	Ferrol	A Malata	12th	2025–26
Real Unión	1915	Irun	Gal	1st in 2ª Federación - Group 2	2026–27
Unionistas	2013	Salamanca	Reina Sofía	8th	2021–22
Zamora	1968	Zamora	Ruta de la Plata	3rd	2024–25
Group 2
Águilas	2010	Águilas	El Rubial	3rd in 2ª Federación - Group 4	2026–27
Alcorcón	1971	Alcorcón	Santo Domingo	11th	2024–25
Algeciras	1909	Algeciras	Nuevo Mirador	8th	2021–22
Antequera	1992	Antequera	El Maulí	7th	2023–24
Atlético Madrileño	1963	Alcalá de Henares	Centro Deportivo	3rd	2023–24
Cartagena	1995	Cartagena	Can Dragó	6th	2025–26
Europa	1907	Barcelona	Cartagonova	5th	2025–26
Gimnàstic	1886	Tarragona	Nou Estadi	14th	2021–22
Hércules	1922	Alicante	José Rico Pérez	9th	2024–25
Huesca	1960	Huesca	El Alcoraz	20th in Segunda División	2026–27
Ibiza	2015	Ibiza	Can Misses	12th	2023–24
Jaén	1922	Jaén	La Victoria	5th in 2ª Federación - Group 4	2026–27
Juventud Torremolinos	1958	Torremolinos	El Pozuelo	15th	2025–26
Murcia	1919	Murcia	Nueva Condomina	10th	2022–23
Rayo Majadahonda	1976	Majadahonda	Cerro del Espino	1st in 2ª Federación - Group 5	2026–27
Real Madrid Castilla	1930	Madrid	Alfredo Di Stéfano	5th in Group 1	2021–22
Sant Andreu	1909	Barcelona	Narcís Sala	1st in 2ª Federación - Group 3	2026–27
Teruel	1954	Teruel	Pinilla	15th	2025–26
Villarreal B	1999	Villarreal	Estadio de la Cerámica	4th	2024–25
Zaragoza	1932	Zaragoza	La Romareda	22ndin Segunda División	2026–27

== Segunda Federación ==
=== 2026–27 Segunda Federación clubs ===
Club	Founded	Home city	Stadium	In division since
Group 1
Alavés B	1959	Vitoria-Gasteiz	José Luis Compañón	2022–23
Amorebieta	1925	Amorebieta-Etxano	Urritxe	2026–27
Arosa	1945	Vilagarcía de Arousa	A Lomba	2026–27
Atlético Astorga	1944	Astorga	La Eragudina	2025–26
Basconia	1913	Basauri	Artunduaga	2025–26
Bergantiños	1923	Carballo	As Eiroas	2024–25
Compostela	1928 (Note: Refounded in 1962 and 2004.)	Santiago de Compostela	Vero Boquete	2026–27
Coruxo	1930	Vigo	O Vao	2021–22
Eibar B	1994 (Note: Refounded in 2024.)	Eibar	Unbe	2024–25
Gernika	1922	Gernika	Urbieta	2021–22
Gimnástica Torrelavega	1907	Torrelavega	El Malecón	2026–27
Llanera	1981	Llanera	Pepe Quimarán	2026–27
Marino Luanco	1931	Luanco	Miramar	2021–22
Ourense CF (Note: Not to be confused with UD Ourense.)	1977	Ourense	O Couto	2026–27
Oviedo Vetusta	1929 (Note: Refounded in 2006.)	Oviedo	El Requexón	2025–26
Portugalete	1909	Portugalete	La Florida	2026–27
Rayo Cantabria	1926	Santander	La Albericia	2021–22
Sestao River	1996	Sestao	Las Llanas	2026–27
Group 2
Arnedo	1949	Arnedo	Sendero	2026–27
Barbastro	1934	Barbastro	Municipal de Deportes	2023–24
Barcelona Atlètic	1970	Barcelona	Johan Cruyff	2025–26
Calamocha	1940	Calamocha	Jumaya	2026–27
Ebro	1942 (Note: Refounded in 1961.)	Zaragoza	El Carmen	2025–26
Espanyol B	1991	Cornellà de Llobregat	Dani Jarque	2021–22
Girona B	2011	Girona	Torres de Palau	2025–26
SD Logroñés (Note: Not to be confused with UD Logroñés.)	2009	Logroño	Las Gaunas	2024–25
UD Logroñés B	2009	Logroño	Ciudad Deportiva UD Logroñés	2026–27
Manresa	1916	Manresa	Nou Congost	2026–27
Náxara	1933	Nájera	La Salera	2025–26
Olot	1921	Olot	Municipal d'Olot	2024–25
Osasuna B	1962	Pamplona	Tajonar	2026–27
Peña Sport	1925	Tafalla	San Francisco	2026–27
Reus FCR	1922 (Note: Refounded in 2022.)	Reus	Municipal de Reus	2025–26
Terrassa	1906	Terrassa	Olímpic	2021–22
Tudelano	1935	Tudela	Ciudad de Tudela	2022–23
Utebo	1924	Utebo	Santa Ana	2022–23
Group 3
Alcoyano	1928	Alcoy	El Collao	2025–26
Atlético Baleares	1920	Palma de Mallorca	Balear	2024–25
Castellón B	1958	Castellón de la Plana	Gaetà Huguet	2025–26
Castellonense	1946	Castelló	Antonio Escuriet	2026–27
Cieza	1923 (Note: Refounded in 1952 and 1969.)	Cieza	La Arboleja	2026–27
Elche Ilicitano	1932	Elche	José Díez Iborra	2024–25
Intercity	2017	Alicante	Antonio Solana	2025–26
La Nucía	1995	La Nucia	Camilo Cano	2026–27
Lorca Deportiva	2012	Lorca	Francisco Artés Carrasco	2025–26
Mallorca B	1967	Palma de Mallorca	Son Bibiloni	2026–27
Minera	1927	Llano del Beal	Ángel Cedrán	2024–25
Murcia Imperial	1922	Murcia	Campus Universitario	2026–27
Orihuela	1993	Orihuela	Los Arcos	2023–24
Peña Deportiva	1935	Santa Eulària des Riu	Municipal de Santa Eulària	2026–27
Poblense	1935	Sa Pobla	Nou Camp	2025–26
UCAM Murcia	1999	Murcia	La Condomina	2022–23
Valencia Mestalla	1944	Valencia	Antonio Puchades	2022–23
Yeclano	2004	Yecla	La Constitución	2025–26
Group 4
Atlético Antoniano	1964 (Note: Refounded in 1994.)	Lebrija	Municipal de Lebrija	2023–24
Atlético Central	2018	Seville	Vega de Triana	2026–27
Atlético Sanluqueño	1948	Sanlúcar de Barrameda	El Palmar	2026–27
Badajoz	1905	Badajoz	Nuevo Vivero	2026–27
Betis Deportivo	1942	Seville	Luis del Sol	2026–27
Ciudad de Lucena	2008	Lucena	Ciudad de Lucena	2026–27
Don Benito	1928	Don Benito	Vicente Sanz	2026–27
Estepona	2014	Estepona	Francisco Muñoz Pérez	2022–23
Las Palmas Atlético	1959	Las Palmas	Anexo Gran Canaria	2025–26
Linares	2009	Linares	Linarejos	2024–25
Marbella	1997	Marbella	Municipal de Marbella	2026–27
Mijas-Las Lagunas	1991	Las Lagunas	Juan Gambero Culebra	2026–27
Puente Genil	1939	Puente Genil	Manuel Polinario	2025–26
Recreativo	1889	Huelva	Nuevo Colombino	2025–26
Sevilla Atlético	1950	Seville	Jesús Navas	2026–27
Tamaraceite	1966	Las Palmas	Juan Guedes	2026–27
Tenerife B	1960	Santa Cruz de Tenerife	Centro Insular	2024–25
Xerez	1947	Jerez de la Frontera	Chapín	2024–25
Group 5
Alcalá	1929	Alcalá de Henares	Val	2025–26
Atlético Albacete	1962	Albacete	Andrés Iniesta	2026–27
Atlético Madrid C	1972	Majadahonda	Cerro del Espino	2026–27
Atlético Paso	1952	El Paso	Municipal El Paso	2026–27
Atlético Tordesillas	1969	Tordesillas	Las Salinas	2026–27
Ávila	1923	Ávila	Adolfo Suárez	2024–25
Calvo Sotelo	2015	Puertollano	Ciudad de Puertollano	2026–27
Conquense	1946	Cuenca	La Fuensanta	2024–25
Getafe B	1983	Getafe	Ciudad Deportiva	2023–24
Gimnástica Segoviana	1928	Segovia	La Albuera	2025–26
Guadalajara	1947	Guadalajara	Pedro Escartín	2026–27
Navalcarnero	1961	Navalcarnero	Mariano González	2021–22
Numancia	1945	Soria	Los Pajaritos	2023–24
Real Madrid C	1952 (Note: Refounded in 1973.)	Madrid	Ciudad Real Madrid	2024–25
Salamanca	2013	Salamanca	Helmántico	2024–25
San Sebastián de los Reyes	1971	San Sebastián de los Reyes	Nuevo Matapiñonera	2023–24
Talavera de la Reina	2011	Talavera de la Reina	El Prado	2026–27
Valladolid Promesas	1942	Valladolid	Ciudad Deportiva	2026–27

== Tercera Federación ==
=== 2026–27 Tercera Federación clubs ===
==== Group 1 - (Galicia (Spain)) Galicia ====
Club	Founded	Home city	Stadium	In division since
Alondras	1928	Cangas	O Morrazo	2021–22
Antela	1919	Xinzo de Limia	A Moreira	2026–27
Arenteiro	1958	O Carballiño	Espiñedo	2026–27
Atlético Arteixo	1949	Arteixo	Ponte dos Brozos	2022–23
Barco	1973	O Barco de Valdeorras	Calabagueiros	2025–26
Boiro	1966	Boiro	Barraña	2024–25
Céltiga	1926	A Illa de Arousa	Salvador Otero	2025–26
Estradense	1925	A Estrada	Campo Municipal	2021–22
Gran Peña	1926	Vigo	Barreiro	2022–23
Lalín	1974	Lalín	Manuel Anxo Cortizo	2026–27
Montañeros	1968 (Note: Refounded in 2014.)	A Coruña	Elviña Grande	2025–26
Pontevedra B	1965	Pontevedra	A Xunqueira	2026–27
Portonovo	1948	Portonovo	Baltar	2026–27
Racing Villalbés	1931	Vilalba	A Magdalena	2024–25
Sarriana	1968	Sarria	Ribela	2026–27
Silva	1940	A Coruña	A Grela	2021–22
Somozas	1984	As Somozas	Pardiñas	2021–22
Viveiro	1923	Viveiro	Cantarrana	2021–22

==== Group 2 - Asturias ====
Club	Founded	Home city	Stadium	In division since
Andés	1949	Andés	San Pedro	2026–27
Astur	1923 (Note: Refounded in 1949.)	Oviedo	Hermanos Llana	2026–27
Avilés Stadium	2015	Avilés	Muro de Zaro	2022–23
Caudal	1918	Mieres	Hermanos Antuña	2021–22
Ceares	1946	Gijón	La Cruz	2022–23
Colunga	1934	Colunga	Santianes	2021–22
Condal	1940 (Note: Refounded in 1968.)	Noreña	Alejandro Ortea	2026–27
Covadonga	1979	Oviedo	Juan Antonio Álvarez Rabanal	2024–25
Gijón Industrial	1969	Gijón	Santa Cruz	2025–26
L'Entregu	1997	El Entrego	Nuevo Nalón	2021–22
Langreo	1961	Langreo	Ganzábal	2026–27
Lealtad	1916	Villaviciosa	Les Caleyes	2026–27
Llanes	1949	Llanes	Santa Cruz	2025–26
Mosconia	1945 (Note: Refounded in 1961.)	Grado	Marqués de la Vega de Anzo	2024–25
Praviano	1949	Pravia	Santa Catalina	2021–22
San Martín	2012	Sotrondio	El Florán	2024–25
Siero	1916	La Pola Siero	El Bayu	2026–27
Sporting Atlético	1960	Gijón	Pepe Ortiz	2021–22

==== Group 3 - Cantabria ====
Club	Founded	Home city	Stadium	In division since
Atlético Albericia	1974	Santander	Juan Hormaechea	2021–22
Atlético Mineros	2015	Puente San Miguel	Reocín	2026–27
Barquereño	1957	San Vicente de la Barquera	El Castañar	2024–25
Bezana	1970	Santa Cruz de Bezana	Municipal de Bezana	2023–24
Castro	1952	Castro Urdiales	Mioño	2021–22
Cayón	1915	Santa María de Cayón	Fernando Astobiza	2024–25
Escobedo	1917	Escobedo	Eusebio Arce	2025–26
Guarnizo	1922	Guarnizo	El Pilar	2021–22
Laredo	1918	Laredo	San Lorenzo	2025–26
Naval	1928	Reinosa	San Francisco	2026–27
Revilla	1974	Revilla	El Crucero	2022–23
Sámano	1970	Sámano	Vallegón	2026–27
Selaya	1931	Selaya	El Castañal	2025–26
Solares-Medio Cudeyo	1968	Solares	La Estación	2026–27
Torina	1960	Bárcena de Pie de Concha	Municipal Bárcena de Pie de Concha	2021–22
Tropezón	1983	Torrelavega	Santa Ana	2022–23
Velarde	1967	Muriedas	La Maruca	2026–27
Vimenor	1929	Piélagos	La Vidriera	2021–22

==== Group 4 - (Basque Country (autonomous community)) Basque Country ====
Club	Founded	Home city	Stadium	In division since
Alavés C	1980 (Note: Refounded in 2022.)	Vitoria-Gasteiz	José Luis Compañón	2023–24
Amurrio	1949	Amurrio	Basarte	2026–27
Aretxabaleta	1946	Aretxabaleta	Ibarra	2024–25
Aurrerá Vitoria	1935	Vitoria-Gasteiz	Olaranbe	2025–26
Beasain	1905	Beasain	Loinaz	2026–27
Cultural Durango	1919	Durango	Tabira	2021–22
Derio	1977	Derio	Ibaiondo	2023–24
Eibar C	2014	Eibar	Unbe	2024–25
Erandio	1915	Erandio	Nuevo Ategorri	2026–27
Lagun Onak	1944	Azpeitia	Garmendipe	2021–22
Leioa	1925	Leioa	Sarriena	2021–22
Pasaia	1941	Pasaia	Don Bosco	2021–22
Real Sociedad C	1998 (Note: Refounded in 2016.)	San Sebastián	José Luis Orbegozo	2025–26
Real Unión B	1923	Irun	Anexo del Stadium Gal	2026–27
San Ignacio	1964	Vitoria-Gasteiz	Adurtzabal	2021–22
Santurtzi	1952	Santurtzi	San Jorge	2024–25
Sodupe	1947	Sodupe	Lorenzo Hurtado de Saratxo	2026–27
Touring	1923	Errenteria	Fandería	2022–23

==== Group 5 - Catalonia ====
Club	Founded	Home city	Stadium	In division since
Atlètic Lleida	1926 (Note: Refounded in 2019.)	Lleida	Ramón Farrús	2026–27
Badalona	1903	Badalona	Municipal de Badalona	2022–23
Cerdanyola del Vallès	2006	Cerdanyola del Vallès	La Bòbila-Pinetons	2024–25
Cornellà	1951	Cornellà de Llobregat	Nou Estadi Municipal	2025–26
Europa B	2012	Barcelona	Nou Sardenya	2024–25
Grama	2013	Santa Coloma de Gramenet	Can Peixauet	2021–22
L'Escala	1912	L'Escala	Municipal de L'Escala	2023–24
L'Hospitalet	1957	L'Hospitalet de Llobregat	La Feixa Llarga	2021–22
Martinenc	1909	Barcelona	Guinardó	2026–27
Mollerussa	1919	Mollerussa	Municipal d'Esports	2023–24
Montañesa	1927	Barcelona	Nou Barris	2022–23
Peralada	1915	Peralada	Municipal de Peralada	2021–22
Pobla de Mafumet	1953	La Pobla de Mafumet	Municipal de La Pobla de Mafumet	2026–27
San Cristóbal	1957	Terrassa	Ca n'Anglada	2021–22
San Juan Atlético de Montcada	1942	Montcada i Reixac	Can Sant Joan	2026–27
Tona	1956	Tona	Municipal de Tona	2022–23
Vilanova	1951	Vilanova i la Geltrú	Municipal d'Esports	2025–26
Vilassar de Mar	1923	Vilassar de Mar	Xevi Ramón	2021–22

==== Group 6 - Valencian Community ====
Club	Founded	Home city	Stadium	In division since
Acero	1919	Sagunto	El Fornàs	2026–27
Athletic Torrellano	2012	Torrellano	Municipal de Torrellano	2021–22
Atlético Levante	1962	Buñol	Buñol	2022–23
Atlético Saguntino	1951	Sagunto	Morvedre	2024–25
Atzeneta	1975	Atzeneta d'Albaida	El Regit	2021–22
Buñol	1921	Buñol	Beltrán Báguena	2025–26
Crevillente	1967	Crevillent	Enrique Miralles	2024–25
Eldense B	1994	Elda	Anexo del Nuevo Pepico Amat	2026–27
Español de San Vicente	1967	San Vicente del Raspeig	Ciudad Deportiva de San Vicente del Raspeig	2021–22
Hércules B	1974	Alicante	Juan Antonio Samaranch	2025–26
Ontinyent 1931	2019	Ontinyent	El Clariano	2023–24
Roda	1974	Villarreal	Mini Estadi	2021–22
Soneja	1928	Soneja	El Arco	2023–24
Torrent	1922	Torrent	San Gregorio	2026–27
Torrevieja	2020	Torrevieja	Vicente García	2026–27
Utiel	1945	Utiel	La Celadilla	2023–24
Vall de Uxó	1975	La Vall d'Uixó	José Mangriñán	2024–25
Villarreal C	2002	Villarreal	Mini Estadi	2021–22

==== Group 7 - Community of Madrid ====
Club	Founded	Home city	Stadium	In division since
Cala Pozuelo	1965	Pozuelo de Alarcón	El Pradillo	2026–27
Fuenlabrada	1975	Fuenlabrada	Fernando Torres	2026–27
Galapagar	1969	Galapagar	El Chopo	2021–22
Las Rozas	1966	Las Rozas	Dehesa de Navalcarbón	2021–22
Leganés B	1959	Leganés	Instalación Deportiva Butarque	2023–24
México	1995	Paracuellos de Jarama	Municipal de Paracuellos	2021–22
Moscardó	1945	Madrid	Román Valero	2026–27
Móstoles URJC	1996	Móstoles	El Soto	2025–26
Parla Escuela	1989	Parla	Las Américas	2026–27
Pozuelo de Alarcón	1995	Pozuelo de Alarcón	Valle de las Cañas	2025–26
Rayo Ciudad Alcobendas	2011	Alcobendas	Valdelasfuentes	2026–27
Rayo Vallecano B	1973	Madrid	Ciudad Deportiva	2026–27
Real Aranjuez	1948	Aranjuez	El Deleite	2026–27
San Sebastián de los Reyes B	2002	San Sebastián de los Reyes	Rafael Delgado Rosa	2025–26
Siello	1992 (Note: Refounded in 2024.)	Madrid	Orcasitas	2025–26
Torrejón	2002	Torrejón de Ardoz	Las Veredillas	2021–22
Trival Valderas	2004	Alcorcón	La Canaleja	2021–22
Unión Adarve	1961	Madrid	Vicente del Bosque	2025–26

==== Group 8 - Castile and León ====
Club	Founded	Home city	Stadium	In division since
Almazán	1967	Almazán	La Arboleda	2021–22
Arandina	1987	Aranda de Duero	El Montecillo	2024–25
Atlético Bembibre	1922	Bembibre	La Devesa	2021–22
Atlético Mansillés	2008	Mansilla de las Mulas	La Caldera	2024–25
Burgos Promesas	2000	Burgos	Castañares	2026–27
Calasanz	1987	Soria	José Andrés Diago	2026–27
Colegios Diocesanos	1986	Ávila	Sancti Spiritu	2025–26
Cristo Atlético	1985	Palencia	Nueva Balastera	2023–24
Guijuelo	1974	Guijuelo	Municipal de Guijuelo	2025–26
Júpiter Leonés	1929 (Note: Refounded in 2014.)	León	Puente Castro	2021–22
La Virgen del Camino	1998	La Virgen del Camino	Los Dominicos	2021–22
Mirandés B	1967 (Note: Refounded in 2004.)	Miranda de Ebro	Ence	2021–22
Palencia	2013	Palencia	Nueva Balastera	2021–22
Salamanca UDS B	2016	Salamanca	Pistas del Helmántico	2026–27
Santa Marta	1982	Santa Marta de Tormes	Alfonso San Casto	2021–22
Turégano	1950	Turégano	El Burgo	2026–27
Unionistas B	2015	Salamanca	Reina Sofía	2025–26
Villaralbo	1952	Villaralbo	Ciudad Deportiva Fernández Garcia	2023–24

==== Group 9 - Eastern Andalusia and Melilla ====
Club	Founded	Home city	Stadium	In division since
Alhaurino	1908	Alhaurín el Grande	Miguel Fijones	2025–26
Almería B	1997	Almería	Anexo al Power Horse Stadium	2026–27
Arenas	1931	Armilla	Municipal de Armilla	2022–23
Atlético Malagueño	1990	Málaga	El Viso	2026–27
Atlético Marbella	2010	Marbella	Luis Teruel	2026–27
Atlético Mancha Real	1984	Mancha Real	La Juventud	2023–24
Atlético Porcuna	1975	Porcuna	San Benito	2024–25
Cantoria	2017	Cantoria	Los Olivos	2026–27
Churriana	1946	Churriana de la Vega	El Frascuelo	2025–26
Ciudad de Torredonjimeno	2009	Torredonjimeno	Matías Prats	2021–22
Huétor Vega	1927	Huétor Vega	Las Viñas	2021–22
Málaga Juniors	2013	Málaga	Campo de la Federación Malagueña	2026–27
Marbellí	2006	Marbella	Antonio Naranjo	2024–25
Melilla	1976	Melilla	Álvarez Claro	2026–27
Motril	2012	Motril	Escribano Castilla	2021–22
Recreativo Granada	1947	Granada	Ciudad Deportiva	2025–26
San Pedro	1974	San Pedro Alcántara	Municipal de San Pedro Alcántara	2025–26
Torre del Mar	1971	Torre del Mar	Juan Manuel Azuaga	2021–22

==== Group 10 - Western Andalusia and Ceuta ====
Club	Founded	Home city	Stadium	In division since
Atlético Onubense	1960	Huelva	Ciudad Deportiva Recreativo de Huelva	2024–25
Bollullos	1933	Bollullos Par del Condado	Eloy Ávila Cano	2022–23
Cádiz Mirandilla	1973	Cádiz	Ramón Blanco Rodríguez	2025–26
Ceuta B	2012	Ceuta	Alfonso Murube	2021–22
Chiclana	1948 (Note: Refounded in 1957.)	Chiclana de la Frontera	Municipal de Chiclana	2025–26
Conil	1931	Conil de la Frontera	José Antonio Pérez Ureba	2021–22
Córdoba B	1951	Córdoba	Rafael Gómez	2021–22
Dos Hermanas	1971 (Note: Refounded in 2021.)	Dos Hermanas	Miguel Román García	2025–26
Egabrense	1924	Cabra	María Dolores Jiménez Guardeño	2026–27
Linense	1912	La Línea de la Concepción	Municipal de La Línea	2025–26
Pozoblanco	1926	Pozoblanco	Municipal de Pozoblanco	2021–22
Racing Portuense	1928	El Puerto de Santa María	José del Cuvillo	2026–27
San Roque de Lepe	1956	Lepe	Ciudad de Lepe	2024–25
Real Betis C	1962 (Note: Refounded in 2022.)	Seville	Luis del Sol	2026–27
Sevilla C	2003	Seville	José Ramón Cisneros Palacios	2021–22
Tomares	1976	Tomares	San Sebastián	2024–25
Utrera	1946 (Note: Refounded in 1975.)	Utrera	San Juan Bosco	2023–24
Xerez Deportivo	2013	Jerez de la Frontera	Chapín	2026–27

==== Group 11 - Balearic Islands ====
Club	Founded	Home city	Stadium	In division since
Alcúdia	1922	Alcúdia	Els Arcs	2023–24
Andratx	1957	Andratx	Sa Plana	2026–27
Arenal	1970	S'Arenal de Llucmajor	Municipal de s'Arenal	2026–27
Binissalem	1914	Binissalem	Miquel Pons	2021–22
Cardassar	1924	Sant Llorenç des Cardassar	Es Moleter	2025–26
Constància	1922	Inca	Nou Camp d'Inca	2021–22
Formentera	1971	Sant Francesc Xavier	Municipal de Sant Francesc	2024–25
Ibiza Islas Pitiusas	2012	Ibiza	Can Misses	2026–27
Inter Ibiza	2014	Ibiza	Can Cantó	2025–26
Llosetense	1944	Lloseta	Municipal de Lloseta	2021–22
Manacor	1923	Manacor	Na Capellera	2021–22
Mercadal	1923	Es Mercadal	San Martí	2021–22
Migjorn	1972	Es Migjorn Gran	Los Nogales	2026–27
Platges de Calvià	1942	Magaluf	Municipal de Magaluf	2021–22
Porreres	1923	Porreres	Ses Forques	2026–27
Sant Jordi	1949	Sant Jordi de ses Salines	Kiko Serra	2026–27
Santanyí	1968	Santanyí	Municipal de Santanyí	2021–22
Sineu	1942	Sineu	Son Magí	2026–27

==== Group 12 - Canary Islands ====
Club	Founded	Home city	Stadium	In division since
Añaza	1990	Santa Cruz de Tenerife	María José Pérez González	2026–27
Estrella	1946	Santa Lucía de Tirajana	Las Palmitas	2026–27
Laguna	1984	San Cristóbal de La Laguna	Francisco Peraza	2026–27
Lanzarote	1970	Arrecife	Ciudad Deportiva	2021–22
Las Palmas C	2006 (Note: Refounded in 2011.)	Las Palmas	Anexo Gran Canaria	2025–26
Los Llanos de Aridane	1996	Los Llanos de Aridane	Aceró	2026–27
Marino	1933	Playa de las Américas	Antonio Domínguez	2021–22
Mensajero	1922	Santa Cruz de La Palma	Silvestre Carrillo	2024–25
Panadería Pulido	1993	Vega de San Mateo	San Mateo	2022–23
Playas de Sotavento	2009	Pájara	Morro Jable	2026–27
Real Unión Tenerife	1915	Santa Cruz de Tenerife	La Salud	2025–26
San Bartolomé	1972	San Bartolomé	Pedro Espinosa de León	2023–24
San Fernando	1992	Maspalomas	Ciudad Deportiva de Maspalomas	2024–25
San Miguel	1948	San Miguel de Abona	Paco Tejera	2024–25
Tenerife C	2005	Santa Cruz de Tenerife	Centro Insular	2025–26
Unión Sur Yaiza	1983	Yaiza	Municipal de Yaiza	2025–26
Villa de Santa Brígida	2004	Santa Brígida	El Guiniguada	2021–22
Villaverde Norte	1976	Villaverde	Doña Julita	2026–27

==== Group 13 - Region of Murcia ====
Club	Founded	Home city	Stadium	In division since
Águilas B	2008	Águilas	El Rubial	2024–25
Alcantarilla	2012	Alcantarilla	Ángel Sornichero	2026–27
Algar	1930	El Algar	Sánchez Luengo	2026–27
Atlético Pulpileño	2002	Pulpí (Note: Located in Andalusia.)	San Miguel	2022–23
Atlético Santa Cruz	2020	Murcia	La Peñeta	2025–26
Bala Azul	1948	Mazarrón	Playa Sol	2024–25
Bullas Deportivo	2016	Bullas	Nicolás de las Peñas	2026–27
Cartagena B	2015	Cartagena	Ciudad Jardín	2024–25
Cotillas	2021	Las Torres de Cotillas	Onofre Fernández Verdú	2026–27
Deportivo Marítimo	2024	Cartagena	Mundial 82	2024–25
Los Garres	2007	Murcia	Las Tejeras	2026–27
Mazarrón	2010	Mazarrón	Pedro Méndez Méndez	2025–26
Minerva	2012	Alumbres	El Secante	2024–25
Olímpico Totana	1961	Totana	Juan Cayuela	2025–26
San Javier	2023	San Javier	Pitín	2026–27
Santomera	1948	Santomera	El Limonar	2024–25
UCAM Murcia B	2013	Sangonera la Verde	El Mayayo	2021–22
Unión Molinense	2017	Molina de Segura	Sánchez Cánovas	2022–23

==== Group 14 - Extremadura ====
Club	Founded	Home city	Stadium	In division since
Atlético Pueblonuevo	1969	Pueblonuevo del Guadiana	Antonio Amaya	2022–23
Azuaga	1972	Azuaga	Deportes de Azuaga	2021–22
Cabeza del Buey	1970	Cabeza del Buey	Municipal de Cabeza del Buey	2025–26
Castuera	1969	Castuera	Manuel Ruiz	2026–27
Gévora	1962	Gévora	Municipal de Gévora	2025–26
Guadiana	1963	Guadiana	Ernesto Sánchez Millán	2026–27
Jaraíz	1972	Jaraíz de la Vera	Municipal de Jaraíz	2023–24
Jerez	1969	Jerez de los Caballeros	Manuel Calzado Galván	2021–22
Llerenense	1967	Llerena	Fernando Robina	2024–25
Montijo	1922	Montijo	Emilio Macarro Rodríguez	2024–25
Moralo	1965	Navalmoral de la Mata	Municipal de Navalmoral	2021–22
Plasencia	1940	Plasencia	Ciudad Deportiva de Plasencia	2026–27
Puebla de la Calzada	2007	Puebla de la Calzada	Municipal de Puebla de la Calzada	2024–25
Quintana	1969	Quintana de la Serena	Municipal de Quintana	2026–27
Santa Amalia	1969	Santa Amalia	Municipal de Santa Amalia	2024–25
Villafranca	1949	Villafranca de los Barros	Municipal de Villafranca	2021–22
Villanovense	1992	Villanueva de la Serena	Romero Cuerda	2025–26
Zafra	2000	Zafra	Nuevo Estadio	2026–27

==== Group 15 - Navarre ====
Club	Founded	Home city	Stadium	In division since
Aoiz	1929	Agoitz	San Miguel	2025–26
Avance	1973	Arre	Igueldea	2025–26
Beti Kozkor	1997	Lekunberri	Plazaola	2023–24
Beti Onak	1950	Villava	Lorenzo Goikoa	2021–22
Bidezarra	1996	Noáin	El Soto	2023–24
Cantolagua	1927	Sangüesa	Cantolagua	2026–27
Cirbonero	1945	Cintruénigo	San Juan	2023–24
Cortes	1927	Cortes	San Francisco Javier	2021–22
Doneztebe	2003	Doneztebe-Santesteban	Iñaki Indart	2026–27
Gazte Berriak	1993	Ansoáin	Idaki	2026–27
Huarte	1975	Huarte	Areta	2021–22
Izarra	1924	Estella-Lizarra	Merkatondoa	2025–26
Mutilvera	1968	Aranguren	Valle Aranguren	2026–27
Pamplona	1958	Pamplona	Bidezarra	2021–22
San Juan	1962	Pamplona	San Juan	2024–25
Subiza	1984	Subiza	Sotoburu	2025–26
Txantrea	1952	Pamplona	Txantrea	2021–22
Valle de Egüés	1968	Egüés	Sarriguren	2024–25

==== Group 16 - La Rioja ====
Club	Founded	Home city	Stadium	In division since
Agoncillo	1980	Agoncillo	San Roque	2024–25
Alfaro	1922	Alfaro	La Molineta	2026–27
Anguiano	1995	Anguiano	Isla	2025–26
Atlético Vianés	1951	Viana (Note: Located in Navarre.)	Municipal de Viana	2021–22
Berceo	1948	Logroño	La Isla	2021–22
Calahorra	1946	Calahorra	La Planilla	2025–26
Calasancio	1977	Logroño	La Estrella	2026–27
Casalarreina	1997	Casalarreina	El Soto	2026–27
Cenicero	1984	Cenicero	Las Viñas	2026–27
Comillas	2006	Logroño	Mundial 82	2022–23
Haro	1914	Haro	El Mazo	2021–22
La Calzada	1923	Santo Domingo de La Calzada	El Rollo	2021–22
Oyonesa	1928	Oyón (Note: Located in the Basque Country.)	El Espinar	2021–22
Pradejón	1966	Pradejón	Municipal de Pradejón	2025–26
River Ebro	1952	Rincón de Soto	San Miguel	2026–27
San Marcial	1975	Lardero	Ángel de Vicente	2025–26
Varea	1967 (Note: Refounded in 2009.)	Varea	Municipal de Varea	2021–22
Yagüe	1962	Logroño	El Salvador	2024–25

==== Group 17 - Aragon ====
Club	Founded	Home city	Stadium	In division since
Almudévar	1965	Almudévar	La Corona	2022–23
Andorra CF (Note: Not to be confused with FC Andorra.)	1957	Andorra	Juan Antonio Endeiza	2024–25
Atlético Monzón	1950	Monzón	Isidro Calderón	2021–22
Belchite 97	1997	Belchite	Municipal de Belchite	2023–24
Binéfar	1922	Binéfar	Los Olmos	2021–22
Brea	1971	Brea de Aragón	Piedrabuena	2026–27
Caspe	1923	Caspe	Los Rosales	2021–22
Cuarte	1969	Cuarte de Huerva	Municipal de Cuarte	2021–22
Deportivo Aragón	1958	Zaragoza	Ciudad Deportiva	2026–27
Épila	1947	Épila	La Huerta	2021–22
Ejea	1927	Ejea de los Caballeros	Luchán	2026–27
Fraga	1926	Fraga	La Estacada	2026–27
Huesca B	1950 (Note: Refounded in 2003 and 2017.)	Huesca	San Jorge	2022–23
Illueca	1935	Illueca	Papa Luna	2025–26
Internacional Huesca	1983	Huesca	Huesca-Universidad	2026–27
La Almunia	1947 (Note: Refounded in 1959 and 1966.)	La Almunia de Doña Godina	Tenerías	2024–25
Robres	2001	Robres	San Blas	2025–26
Tamarite	1960	Tamarite de Litera	La Colomina	2022–23

==== Group 18 - Castilla–La Mancha ====
Club	Founded	Home city	Stadium	In division since
Almansa	1992	Almansa	Paco Simón	2026–27
Guadalajara B	Disputed (Note: Club records trace back to the 1970s. Refounded in 1990, 2001 and 2007.)	Guadalajara	Fuente de la Niña	2025–26
Huracán Balazote	2007	Balazote	Barrax	2023–24
Illescas	1946	Illescas	Municipal de Illescas	2025–26
La Solana	1971	La Solana	La Moheda	2025–26
Manchego	2009	Ciudad Real	Rey Juan Carlos I	2024–25
Marchamalo	1973	Marchamalo	La Solana	2022–23
Noblejas	1950	Noblejas	Ángel Luengo	2026–27
Quintanar del Rey	1984	Quintanar del Rey	San Marcos	2026–27
San Clemente	1974	San Clemente	Municipal de San Clemente	2025–26
Socuéllamos	1924	Socuéllamos	Paquito Jiménez	2026–27
Tarancón	1995	Tarancón	Municipal de Tarancón	2021–22
Toledo	1928	Toledo	Salto del Caballo	2022–23
Torrijos	1954	Torrijos	San Francisco	2026–27
Villa	1946	Villa de Don Fadrique	Gregorio Vela	2026–27
Villacañas	1998	Villacañas	Las Pirámides	2021–22
Villarrobledo	1971	Villarrobledo	Nuestra Señora de la Caridad	2021–22
Villarrubia	1959	Villarrubia de los Ojos	Nuevo Municipal	2021–22

== See also ==
- List of football teams in the Province of Seville
