= CD Huétor Tájar =

Association football club in Spain

Huétor Tájar
- Full name: Club Deportivo Agroisa Huétor Tájar
- Founded: 1940
- Ground: Miguel Moranto; Huétor-Tájar, Spain
- Capacity: 520
- Chairman: Luis Daza Ruiz
- Manager: Manuel Moreno “Rizos”
- League: División de Honor – Group 2
- 2025–26: Tercera Federación – Group 9, 15th of 18 (relegated)
Home colours	Away colours

Club Deportivo Agroisa Huétor Tájar is a Spanish football team based in Huétor-Tájar, in the autonomous community of Andalusia. Founded in 1940, it plays in División de Honor – Group 2, holding home matches at Estadio Municipal Miguel Morato, with a capacity of 520 spectators.

== Season to season ==
Season	Tier	Division	Place	Copa del Rey
1977–78	7	2ª Reg.	7th	
1978–79	DNP			
1979–80	7	2ª Reg.	1st	
1980–81	6	1ª Reg.	10th	
1981–82	5	Reg. Pref.	14th	
1982–83	6	1ª Reg.	10th	
1983–84	7	2ª Reg.	9th	
1984–85	7	2ª Reg.	3rd	
1985–86	7	2ª Reg.	3rd	
1986–87	6	1ª Reg.	13th	
1987–88	6	1ª Reg.	7th	
1988–89	6	1ª Reg.	12th	
1989–90	6	1ª Reg.	4th	
1990–91	6	1ª Reg.	2nd	
1991–92	5	Reg. Pref.	16th	
1992–93	6	1ª Reg.	2nd	
1993–94	5	Reg. Pref.	7th	
1994–95	5	Reg. Pref.	10th	
1995–96	5	Reg. Pref.	7th	
1996–97	5	Reg. Pref.	6th	

Season	Tier	Division	Place	Copa del Rey
1997–98	5	Reg. Pref.	12th	
1998–99	5	Reg. Pref.	5th	
1999–2000	5	Reg. Pref.	13th	
2000–01	5	Reg. Pref.	6th	
2001–02	5	Reg. Pref.	13th	
2002–03	5	Reg. Pref.	9th	
2003–04	5	Reg. Pref.	11th	
2004–05	6	Reg. Pref.	5th	
2005–06	6	Reg. Pref.	7th	
2006–07	6	Reg. Pref.	5th	
2007–08	6	Reg. Pref.	1st	
2008–09	5	1ª And.	2nd	
2009–10	4	3ª	16th	
2010–11	4	3ª	13th	
2011–12	4	3ª	14th	
2012–13	4	3ª	16th	
2013–14	4	3ª	9th	
2014–15	4	3ª	6th	
2015–16	4	3ª	9th	
2016–17	4	3ª	4th	

Season	Tier	Division	Place	Copa del Rey
2017–18	4	3ª	5th	
2018–19	4	3ª	11th	
2019–20	4	3ª	12th	
2020–21	4	3ª	5th	
2021–22	5	3ª RFEF	2nd	
2022–23	5	3ª Fed.	12th	
2023–24	5	3ª Fed.	14th	
2024–25	5	3ª Fed.	5th	
2025–26	5	3ª Fed.	15th	
2026–27	6	Div. Hon.		

- 12 seasons in Tercera División
- 5 seasons in Tercera Federación/Tercera División RFEF
