= Antón Achalandabaso =

Spanish footballer and manager

Personal information
- Full name: Antón Achalandabaso Zabala
- Date of birth: 4 April 1898
- Place of birth: Erandio, Spain
- Date of death: 1 October 1939 (aged 41)
- Position: Defender

Senior career*
Years	Team	Apps	(Gls)
1920–1923	Athletic Club		
1923–1925	Erandio		
1925–1927	Racing de Santander		
1928–1932	Real Valladolid		
1934–1935	Avilés Stadium		

Managerial career
- 1930–1933: Real Valladolid
- 1934–1935: Avilés Stadium
- 1935–1936: Erandio
- * Club domestic league appearances and goals

Antón Achalandabaso Zabala (4 April 1898 – 1 October 1939), better known as Antón, was a Spanish footballer who played as a defender for Athletic Bilbao in the early 1920s. He is best known for being the first-ever player-coach in the history of Real Valladolid, which he captained and coached in the early 1930s.

== Biography ==
Born in the Biscayan town of Erandio on 4 April 1898, Achalandabaso began his career playing as a defender at his hometown club Athletic Bilbao, making his debut on 20 February 1921, aged 23. In total, he played seven official matches for Bilbao between 1921 and 1923, all in the Biscay Championship, thus being a member of the Bilbao squad that won the championships 1920–21 and 1922–23.

In 1925, Achalandabaso joined Racing de Santander, where he apparently retired after one season. He then appeared in Valladolid in 1926, where he played, to pass the time, in the ranks of Español, Ferroviaria, and then Real Valladolid, which at the time played in the Tercera División under István Plattkó. In 1930, however, Plattkó decided to change teams, so he was replaced by Achalandabaso, who held that position for three seasons until 1934, when he was dismissed after failing to lead the team to the Segunda División. During these three years, he also captained Valladolid on the field, thus becoming the club's first-ever player-coach.

In the 1934–35 season, Achalandabaso once again performed the functions of a player-coach, this time for Avilés Stadium of the Second Division.

== Death ==
Achalandabaso died on 1 October 1939, at the age of 41.

== Honours ==
Athletic Bilbao

- North Regional Championship:
  - Champions (2): 1920–21 and 1922–23
