= Bollullos CF =

Association football club in Spain

Bollullos
- Full name: Bollullos Club de Fútbol
- Founded: 1933
- Ground: Eloy Ávila Cano, Bollullos Par del Condado, Andalusia, Spain
- Capacity: 1,500
- President: José María Rosado
- Manager: Mario Rodríguez
- League: Tercera Federación – Group 10
- 2025–26: Tercera Federación – Group 10, 4th of 18
Home colours	Away colours

Bollullos Club de Fútbol is a Spanish football team based in Bollullos Par del Condado, in the autonomous community of Andalusia. Founded in 1933, it plays in Tercera Federación – Group 10, holding home games at Estadio Municipal Eloy Ávila Cano, with a capacity of 1,500 people.

== History ==
=== Club background ===
- Bollullos Fútbol Club (1933–1942)
- Educación y Descanso Bollullos (1942–1945)
- Club Deportivo Mercedes (1945–1953)
- Estrella Club de Fútbol (1953–1958)
- Bollullos Club de Fútbol (1958–1965)
- Club Deportivo Mercedes (1965–1969)
- Bollullos Club de Fútbol (1969–)

== Season to season ==
Season	Tier	Division	Place	Copa del Rey
1942–43	4	2ª Reg.	4th	
1943–44	4	1ª Reg.	1st	
1944–45	4	1ª Reg.		
1945–46	4	1ª Reg.	3rd	
1946–47	4	1ª Reg.		
1947–48	4	1ª Reg.		
1948–49	4	1ª Reg.	5th	
1949–50	5	2ª Reg.		
1950–51	5	2ª Reg.		
1951–52	5	2ª Reg.		
1952–53	5	2ª Reg.		
1953–54	5	2ª Reg.	6th	
1954–55	5	2ª Reg.	3rd	
1955–56	5	2ª Reg.	5th	
1956–57	4	1ª Reg.		
1957–58	4	1ª Reg.		
1958–59	3	3ª	10th	
1959–60	3	3ª	9th	
1960–61	3	3ª	9th	
1961–62	3	3ª	15th	

Season	Tier	Division	Place	Copa del Rey
1962–63	3	3ª	16th	
1963–64	4	1ª Reg.	1st	
1964–65	4	1ª Reg.	2nd	
1965–66	4	1ª Reg.	5th	
1966–67	4	1ª Reg.	9th	
1967–68	4	1ª Reg.	10th	
1968–69	5	2ª Reg.		
1969–70	4	1ª Reg.	8th	
1970–71	5	2ª Reg.		
1971–72	5	2ª Reg.		
1972–73	5	2ª Reg.		
1973–74	5	2ª Reg.	6th	
1974–75	5	2ª Reg.	12th	
1975–76	6	2ª Reg.	8th	
1976–77	6	2ª Reg.	5th	
1977–78	7	2ª Reg.	6th	
1978–79	7	2ª Reg.	3rd	
1979–80	7	2ª Reg.	2nd	
1980–81	6	1ª Reg.	1st	
1981–82	5	Reg. Pref.	6th	

Season	Tier	Division	Place	Copa del Rey
1982–83	5	Reg. Pref.	10th	
1983–84	5	Reg. Pref.	3rd	
1984–85	5	Reg. Pref.	2nd	
1985–86	4	3ª	12th	
1986–87	4	3ª	4th	
1987–88	4	3ª	8th	
1988–89	4	3ª	19th	
1989–90	5	Reg. Pref.	17th	
1990–91	6	1ª Reg.		
1991–92	6	1ª Reg.		
1992–93	6	1ª Reg.		
1993–94	6	1ª Reg.		
1994–95	5	Reg. Pref.	14th	
1995–96	5	Reg. Pref.	12th	
1996–97	5	Reg. Pref.	9th	
1997–98	5	Reg. Pref.	2nd	
1998–99	5	Reg. Pref.	3rd	
1999–2000	5	Reg. Pref.	3rd	
2000–01	5	Reg. Pref.	13th	
2001–02	5	Reg. Pref.	1st	

Season	Tier	Division	Place	Copa del Rey
2002–03	4	3ª	15th	
2003–04	4	3ª	2nd	
2004–05	4	3ª	14th	
2005–06	4	3ª	20th	
2006–07	5	1ª And.	14th	
2007–08	6	Reg. Pref.	16th	
2008–09	7	1ª Reg.	1st	
2009–10	6	Reg. Pref.	6th	
2010–11	6	Reg. Pref.	15th	
2011–12	7	1ª Prov.	4th	
2012–13	7	1ª Prov.	7th	
2013–14	7	1ª Prov.	2nd	
2014–15	7	3ª And.	2nd	
2015–16	6	2ª And.	4th	
2016–17	6	1ª And.	8th	
2017–18	6	1ª And.	5th	
2018–19	6	1ª And.	4th	
2019–20	6	1ª And.	1st	
2020–21	5	Div. Hon.	5th	
2021–22	6	Div. Hon.	3rd	

Season	Tier	Division	Place	Copa del Rey
2022–23	5	3ª Fed.	12th	
2023–24	5	3ª Fed.	11th	
2024–25	5	3ª Fed.	6th	
2025–26	5	3ª Fed.	4th	
2026–27	5	3ª Fed.		

- 13 seasons in Tercera División
- 5 seasons in Tercera Federación
