= CD Varea =

Association football club in Spain

Varea
- Full name: Club Deportivo Varea
- Founded: 1967; 2009 (refounded)
- Ground: Municipal de Varea; Varea, La Rioja, Spain
- Capacity: 2,000
- Chairman: (Spain) Ángel Aguado
- Manager: (Spain) Jorge Ochoa
- League: Tercera Federación – Group 16
- 2025–26: Tercera Federación – Group 16, 2nd of 18
Home colours	Away colours

Club Deportivo Varea is a Spanish football team based in Varea, La Rioja, Logroño in the autonomous community of La Rioja. Founded in 1967 and refounded in 2009, it plays in Tercera Federación – Group 16, holding home games at Estadio Municipal de Varea, with a 2,000-seat capacity.

== History ==
Club Deportivo Varea played the first 36 years of its existence in the regional leagues (safe for a short five-year spell in Tercera División).

In 2008–09, the club first achieved promotion to the third division. Shortly before the beginning of the following season, its seat was sold to UD Logroñés, in view of a better representation of the Rioja region. However, only a few months later, it was refounded, and started competing again in Preferente (fifth level), returning to the fourth division at the first attempt. In the 2018-19 season the club finished 6th in the Tercera División, Group 16.

== Season to season ==
=== CD Varea (1967) ===
Season	Tier	Division	Place	Copa del Rey
1969–70	5	2ª Reg.	5th	
1970–71	5	2ª Reg.	11th	
1971–72	5	2ª Reg.	7th	
1972–73	5	2ª Reg.	11th	
1973–74	5	2ª Reg.	13th	
1974–75	6	2ª Reg.	3rd	
1975–76	5	1ª Reg.	13th	
1976–77	6	2ª Reg.	10th	

=== CD Varea (1982) ===
Season	Tier	Division	Place	Copa del Rey
1982–83	7	2ª Reg.	4th	
1983–84	6	1ª Reg.	16th	
1984–85	6	1ª Reg.	17th	
1985–86	7	2ª Reg.	9th	
1986–87	6	1ª Reg.	12th	
1987–88	6	1ª Reg.	3rd	
1988–89	5	Reg. Pref.	8th	
1989–90	5	Reg. Pref.	14th	
1990–91	5	Reg. Pref.	10th	
1991–92	5	Reg. Pref.	1st	
1992–93	4	3ª	17th	
1993–94	4	3ª	11th	
1994–95	4	3ª	16th	
1995–96	4	3ª	16th	

Season	Tier	Division	Place	Copa del Rey
1996–97	4	3ª	19th	
1997–98	5	Reg. Pref.	2nd	
1998–99	5	Reg. Pref.	2nd	
1999–2000	5	Reg. Pref.	2nd	
2000–01	5	Reg. Pref.	2nd	
2001–02	5	Reg. Pref.	2nd	
2002–03	5	Reg. Pref.	2nd	
2003–04	4	3ª	13th	
2004–05	4	3ª	4th	
2005–06	4	3ª	5th	
2006–07	4	3ª	6th	
2007–08	4	3ª	6th	
2008–09	4	3ª	1st	

- 11 seasons in Tercera División

=== CD Varea (2009) ===
Season	Tier	Division	Place	Copa del Rey
2009–10	5	Reg. Pref.	2nd	
2010–11	4	3ª	11th	
2011–12	4	3ª	4th	
2012–13	4	3ª	4th	
2013–14	4	3ª	1st	
2014–15	4	3ª	1st	First round
2015–16	4	3ª	5th	First round
2016–17	4	3ª	6th	
2017–18	4	3ª	5th	
2018–19	4	3ª	6th	
2019–20	4	3ª	2nd	
2020–21	4	3ª	3rd / 6th	
2021–22	5	3ª RFEF	4th	
2022–23	5	3ª Fed.	2nd	
2023–24	5	3ª Fed.	5th	First round
2024–25	5	3ª Fed.	3rd	
2025–26	5	3ª Fed.	2nd	
2026–27	5	3ª Fed.		TBD

- 11 seasons in Tercera División
- 6 seasons in Tercera Federación/Tercera División RFEF
