= Roger Barnils =

Spanish footballer

Personal information
- Full name: Roger Barnils Crusats
- Date of birth: 27 May 1994 (age 32)
- Place of birth: Seva, Spain
- Height: 1.79 m (5 ft 10 1/2 in)
- Position: Defensive midfielder

Team information
- Current team: Tona

Youth career
- Manlleu

Senior career*
Years	Team	Apps	(Gls)
2012–2013	Manlleu	28	(0)
2013–2016	Llagostera	23	(0)
2015–2016	→ Sevilla B (loan)	16	(1)
2016–2017	Prat	31	(2)
2017–2021	Olot	89	(9)
2021–2022	Ibiza Islas Pitiusas	32	(1)
2022–2023	Badalona Futur	23	(0)
2023–2025	Olot	61	(5)
2025–	Tona	4	(0)
- * Club domestic league appearances and goals as of 28 September 2025

Roger Barnils Crusats (born 27 May 1994) is a Spanish footballer who plays for Tercera Federación club Tona as a defensive midfielder.

== Club career ==
Born in Seva, Barcelona, Catalonia, Barnils graduated with local AEC Manlleu's youth setup. He made his debuts as a senior in the 2011–12 campaign, aged only 17, in Tercera División.

On 16 July 2013, Barnils joined Segunda División B's UE Llagostera, achieving promotion to Segunda División (the club's first ever) at the end of the season. On 10 September 2014, he made his debut as a professional, starting in a 0–2 away loss against Real Betis for the campaign's Copa del Rey.

Barnils made his league debut 19 October, coming on as a second-half substitute for Diego Rivas in a 1–4 home loss against RCD Mallorca. On 19 August 2015, he was loaned to Sevilla Atlético in Segunda División B, for one year.
