= Avilés Stadium CF =

Avilés Stadium
- Full name: Avilés Stadium Club de Fütbol
- Founded: 2015
- Ground: Muro de Zaro; Avilés, Asturias, Spain
- Capacity: 4,000
- Chairman: José Manuel Sal de Rellán
- Manager: Luis Valera
- League: Tercera Federación – Group 2
- 2025–26: Tercera Federación – Group 2, 13th of 18
- Website: http://www.avilesstadiumcf.com/
Home colours	Away colours

Avilés Stadium Club de Fútbol is a Spanish football club based in Avilés, Asturias. Founded in 2015, it plays in Tercera Federación – Group 2, holding home games at Estadio Muro de Zaro, with a capacity of 4,000 people.

== History ==
Avilés Stadium was founded in 2015 by a group of supporters worried about the situation of Real Avilés, owned by unpopular José María Tejero. The club has the intention to be run democratically by its members.

On 15 August 2015, the club played its first friendly match, a 3–2 win against Club Hispano at Piedras Blancas, Castrillón, after being losing by 0–2 in the first half. On 13 September 2015, Avilés Stadium played its first official game at Campo de Santo Domingo in the parish of Miranda, its field for the first season. It defeated San Juan La Carisa by 2–0.

On 12 April 2018, Avilés Stadium announced it would merge with local farm team Avilés Deportivo, with the aim of developing its own cantera.

In 2020, despite the league being suspended due to the COVID-19 pandemic, Avilés Stadium was promoted to Tercera División as the second qualified of the Regional Preferente at the moment of the suspension.

== Season to season ==
Season	Tier	Division	Place	Copa del Rey
2015–16	7	2ª Reg.	1st	
2016–17	6	1ª Reg.	4th	
2017–18	6	1ª Reg.	1st	
2018–19	5	Reg. Pref.	5th	
2019–20	5	Reg. Pref.	2nd	
2020–21	4	3ª	11th / 7th	
2021–22	6	Reg. Pref.	1st	
2022–23	5	3ª Fed.	15th	
2023–24	5	3ª Fed.	12th	
2024–25	5	3ª Fed.	11th	
2025–26	5	3ª Fed.	13th	
2026–27	5	3ª Fed.		

- 1 season in Tercera División
- 5 seasons in Tercera Federación

== Stadium ==
Avilés Stadium played the home games of its first three seasons at Campo de Santo Domingo, in the parish of Miranda.

In 2018, the club agreed with the Town Hall to move to Estadio Muro de Zaro, in the neighbourhood of Llaranes.

== Coaches ==
- Manel Erimia and Luis Castro 2015–2016
- Luis Castro 2016–2018
- Luis Valera 2018–present
