= Miranda (Avilés) =

- Parish
- Location within Spain
- Country: Spain
- Autonomous community: Asturias
- Province: Asturias
- Municipality: Avilés

Population (2011)
  - Total: 1,568

Miranda is one of six parishes (administrative divisions) in Avilés, a municipality within the province and autonomous community of Asturias, in northern Spain.

It is 2.93 km^{2} (1.13 sq mi) in size with a population of 1,568 (INE 2011).

== Villages ==
- L'Alfaraz
- Bao
- Los Calvos
- La Cruz d'Illes
- La Cruz de la Foguera
- Heros
- La Lleda
- Miranda
- L'Anduvisa/ Nondivisa
- El Pozo la Granda
- Santana
- Santo Domingo
- Bidoleo/Vidoledo
- Villanueva
