= UE Tona =

Tona
- Full name: Unió Esportiva Tona
- Founded: 1956
- Ground: Estadi Municipal de Tona, Tona, Catalonia, Spain
- Capacity: 2,000
- President: Joaquim Carandell
- Head coach: Eduard Fortet
- League: Tercera Federación – Group 5
- 2025–26: Tercera Federación – Group 5, 9th of 18
- Website: www.uetona.cat
Home colours	Away colours

Unió Esportiva Tona is a Spanish football team based in Tona, in Catalonia. Founded in 1956, they play in Tercera Federación – Group 5, holding home matches at the Estadi Municipal de Tona.

== History ==
The team was founded in 1956, however, until 1972 it began to participate in football leagues, when it was registered in Segunda Regional, a category that at that time was the sixth level in the Spanish football pyramid. During most of its history it remained in regional leagues.

In 2022 the team achieved promotion to Tercera Federación, the fifth category of Spanish football and the last at the professional level, this after being champion of their group in the Primera Catalana.

== Season to season ==
Season	Tier	Division	Place	Copa del Rey
1972–73	6	2ª Reg.	13th	
1973–74	6	2ª Reg.	6th	
1974–75	6	2ª Reg.	7th	
1975–76	6	2ª Reg.	13th	
1976–77	6	2ª Reg.	18th	
1977–78	8	3ª Reg.	1st	
1978–79	6	2ª Reg.	10th	
1979–80	7	2ª Reg.	13th	
1980–81	7	2ª Reg.	12th	
1981–82	7	2ª Reg.	8th	
1982–83	7	2ª Reg.	16th	
1983–84	8	3ª Reg.	2nd	
1984–85	7	2ª Reg.	11th	
1985–86	7	2ª Reg.	17th	
1986–87	8	3ª Reg.	2nd	
1987–88	8	3ª Reg.	12th	
1988–89	8	3ª Reg.	4th	
1989–90	8	3ª Reg.	6th	
1990–91	8	3ª Reg.	10th	
1991–92	9	3ª Ter.	8th	

Season	Tier	Division	Place	Copa del Rey
1992–93	9	3ª Ter.	8th	
1993–94	9	3ª Ter.	3rd	
1994–95	9	3ª Ter.	6th	
1995–96	9	3ª Ter.	3rd	
1996–97	9	3ª Ter.	2nd	
1997–98	9	3ª Ter.	1st	
1998–99	8	2ª Terr.	6th	
1999–2000	8	2ª Terr.	5th	
2000–01	8	2ª Terr.	3rd	
2001–02	8	2ª Terr.	1st	
2002–03	7	1ª Terr.	4th	
2003–04	7	1ª Terr.	5th	
2004–05	7	1ª Terr.	15th	
2005–06	8	2ª Terr.	10th	
2006–07	8	2ª Terr.	1st	
2007–08	7	1ª Terr.	8th	
2008–09	7	1ª Terr.	1st	
2009–10	6	Pref. Terr.	5th	
2010–11	6	Pref. Terr.	2nd	
2011–12	6	2ª Cat.	4th	

Season	Tier	Division	Place	Copa del Rey
2012–13	6	2ª Cat.	2nd	
2013–14	6	2ª Cat.	3rd	
2014–15	6	2ª Cat.	1st	
2015–16	5	1ª Cat.	8th	
2016–17	5	1ª Cat.	15th	
2017–18	6	2ª Cat.	2nd	
2018–19	5	1ª Cat.	13rd	
2019–20	5	1ª Cat.	15th	
2020–21	5	1ª Cat.	1st	
2021–22	6	1ª Cat.	1st	
2022–23	5	3ª Fed.	11th	
2023–24	5	3ª Fed.	6th	
2024–25	5	3ª Fed.	6th	
2025–26	5	3ª Fed.	9th	
2026–27	5	3ª Fed.		

- 5 seasons in Tercera Federación

== Current squad ==
As of 23 September 2025

Note: Flags indicate national team as defined under FIFA eligibility rules; some limited exceptions apply. Players may hold more than one non-FIFA nationality.

No.	Pos.	Nation	Player
1	GK	ESP	Carlos Craviotto
2	DF	ESP	Xavi Murcia
3	DF	ESP	Roger Barnils
4	DF	ESP	Dan Coll
5	DF	ESP	Marc Vicente
6	MF	ESP	Eric Vilanova
7	FW	ESP	Sehou Sarr
8	MF	ESP	Javi García
9	FW	ESP	Arnau Camaño
10	FW	ESP	Dani Peña
11	DF	ESP	Toni Sureda

No.	Pos.	Nation	Player
13	GK	ESP	Izan Mena
14	MF	ESP	Narcís Bou
15	DF	ESP	Ferran Generó
16	MF	ESP	Bernat Casadevall
17	MF	ARG	Nico Sottile
19	DF	ESP	Jaume Salat
20	FW	ESP	Marc Roquet
21	FW	ESP	Nil Salarich
22	DF	ESP	Jon Pilar
23	FW	ESP	Joan Martínez
30	GK	ESP	David Aroca
