= Spain national football team (disambiguation) =

The Spain national football team typically refers to:

- Spain men's national football team
- Spain women's national football team

It may also refer to the youth teams:

- Spain national under-23 football team
- Spain women's national under-23 football team
- Spain national under-21 football team
- Spain national under-20 football team
- Spain women's national under-20 football team
- Spain national under-19 football team
- Spain women's national under-19 football team
- Spain national under-18 football team
- Spain national under-17 football team
- Spain women's national under-17 football team
- Spain national under-16 football team
- Spain national under-15 football team
