= Josh Farrell =

Welsh footballer (born 2003)

Personal information
- Full name: Joshua Farrell
- Date of birth: 27 June 2003 (age 23)
- Place of birth: Marbella, Spain
- Height: 6 ft 0 in (1.82 m)
- Position: Forward

Team information
- Current team: Zamora
- Number: 18

Youth career
- Granada

Senior career*
Years	Team	Apps	(Gls)
2021–2022	Granada B	3	(0)
2022	→ Juventud Torremolinos (loan)	12	(0)
2023–2025	Villanovense	35	(11)
2025	Gimnástica Segoviana	16	(5)
2025–	Zamora	21	(3)

International career^{‡}
2021	Wales U19	3	(0)
2022–2024	Wales U21	4	(2)
- * Club domestic league appearances and goals as of 25 May 2026 ‡ National team caps and goals as of 15 October 2024

Joshua Farrell (born 27 June 2003) is a footballer who plays as a forward for Primera Federación club Zamora. Born in Spain, he is a former Wales youth international.

== Early life ==
Farrell was born on 27 June 2003 in Marbella, Spain to an English father and a mother of Welsh descent. As a child, he regularly visit Wales with his family and is eligible to represent Wales internationally through his grandmother, a native of Blaenau Ffestiniog, Wales.

== Club career ==
As a youth player, Farrell joined the youth academy of Spanish side Granada CF and was promoted to the club's reserve team in 2021. In 2022, he was sent on loan to Spanish side Juventud de Torremolinos CF. Six months later, he signed for Spanish side CF Villanovense. Subsequently, he signed for Spanish side Gimnástica Segoviana CF.
