= List of football teams in the Province of Seville =

This is a list of association football clubs based in the Province of Seville in Spain. (Including defunct clubs and reserves teams)

== La Liga ==
Club	City	Level	First season	Last season
Real Betis	Seville	I	1932-33	Present
Sevilla	Seville	I	1934-35	Present

== Segunda División ==
Club	City	Level	First season	Last season
Real Betis	Seville	I	1929	2014-15
Sevilla	Seville	I	1929	2000-01
Sevilla Atlético	Seville	III	1962-63	2017-18
Écija	Écija	VI	1995-96	1996-97

== Primera División RFEF ==
Club	City	Level	First season	Last season
Real Betis B	Seville	III	2021-22	Present
Sevilla Atlético	Seville	III	2021-22	Present

== Segunda División RFEF ==
Club	City	Level	First season	Last season
Sevilla Atlético	Seville	III	1977-78	2020-21
Betis B	Seville	III	1985-86	2020-21
Utrera	Utrera	V	1989-90	1995-96
Écija	Écija	VI	1992-93	2017-18
Coria	Coria del Río	V	1999-00	2001-02
Dos Hermanas	Dos Hermanas	(defunct)	1999-00	2001-02
Los Palacios	Los Palacios y Villafranca	(defunct)	2003-04	2003-04
Alcalá	Alcalá de Guadaira	VI	2004-05	2010-11

== Tercera División RFEF ==
Club	City	Level	First season	Last season
Coria	Coria del Río	V	1943-44	2020-21
Calavera	Seville	VIII	1946-47	1947-48
Real Betis	Seville	I	1947-48	1953-54
Utrera	Utrera	V	1950-51	Present
Sevilla Atlético	Seville	III	1955-56	2000-01
Morón Balompié	Morón de la Frontera	(defunct)	1956-57	1959-60
Marchena Balompié	Marchena	(defunct)	1956-57	1958-59
Constantina	Constantina	(defunct)	1954-55	1955-56
