= Pradejón =

- Municipality
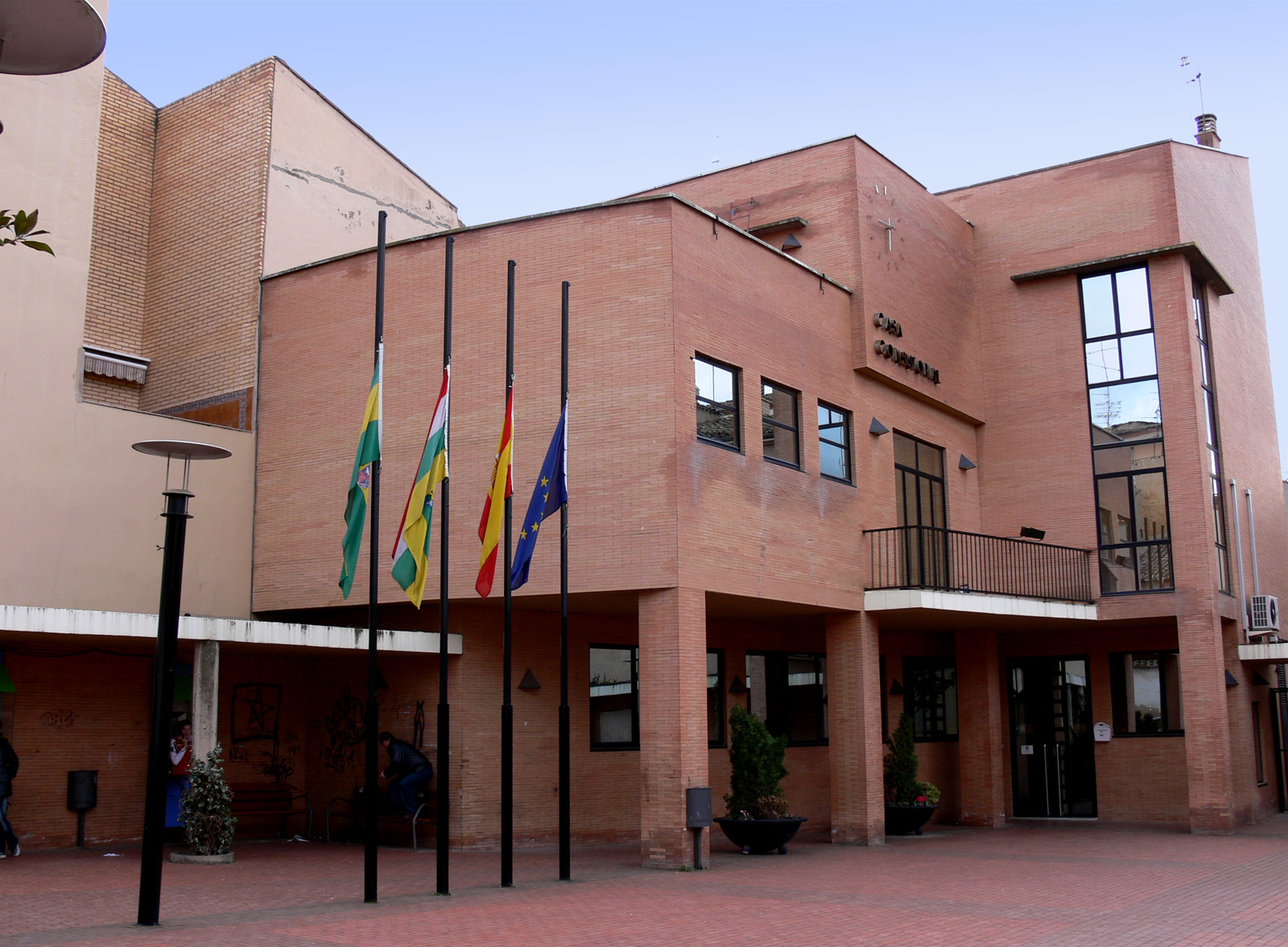
- Town hall of Pradejón

- Flag Coat of arms

- Location within La Rioja, Spain Location within Spain
- Coordinates: 42°20′04″N 2°04′05″W
- Country: Spain
- Autonomous community: La Rioja
- Comarca: Comarca de Calahorra

Government
  - Mayor: Óscar León García (PP)

Area
  - Total: 31.76 km^{2} (12.26 sq mi)
- Elevation: 361 m (1,184 ft)

Population (2025-01-01)
  - Total: 3,742
- Postal code: 26510
- Website: Official website

Pradejón is a village in the province and autonomous community of La Rioja, Spain. The municipality covers an area of 31.76 square kilometres (12.26 sq mi) and as of 2011 had a population of 4094 people.
