= Huétor-Tájar =

Coordinates: 37°11′41″N 4°02′47″W

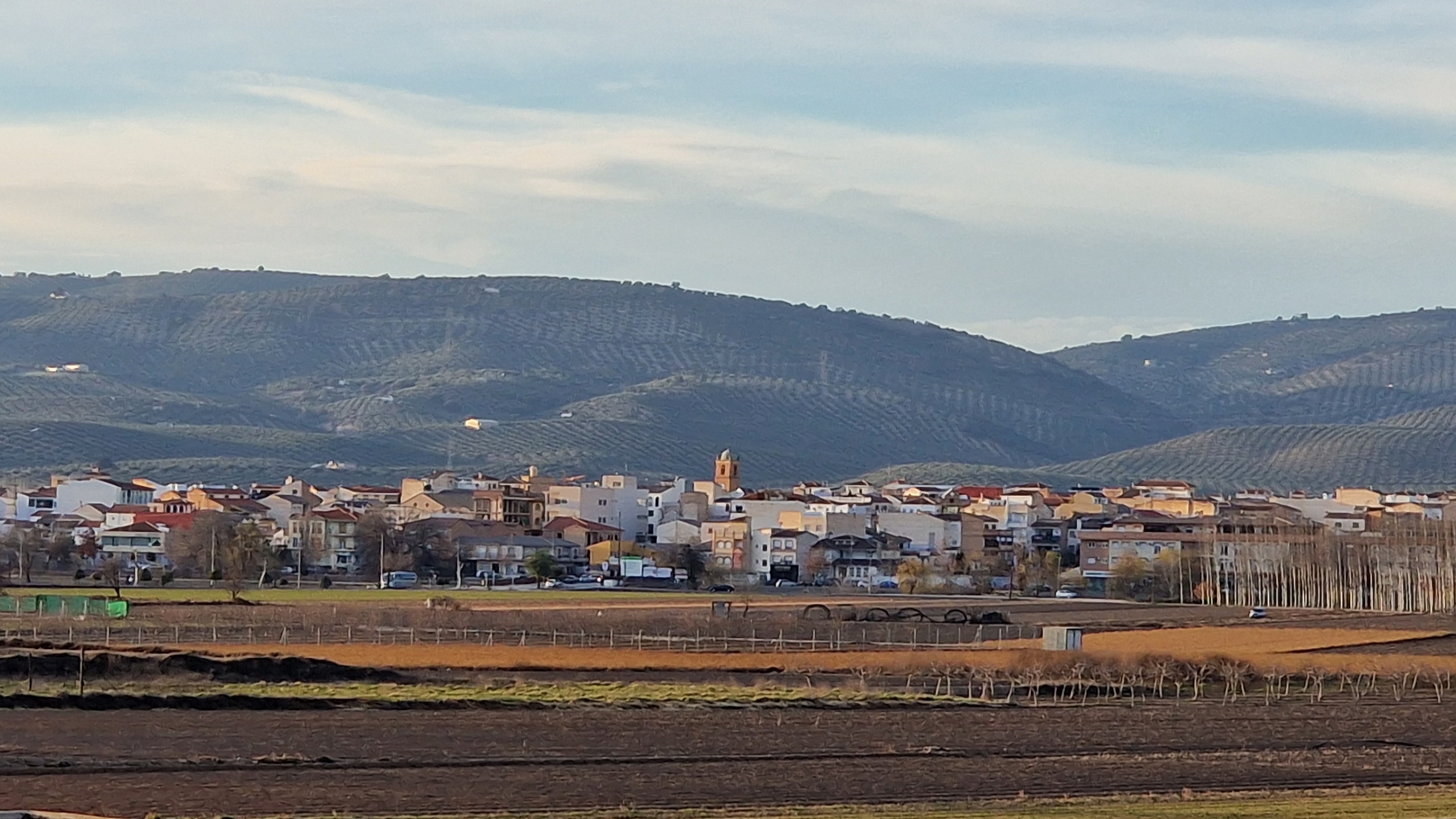

- Flag Coat of arms

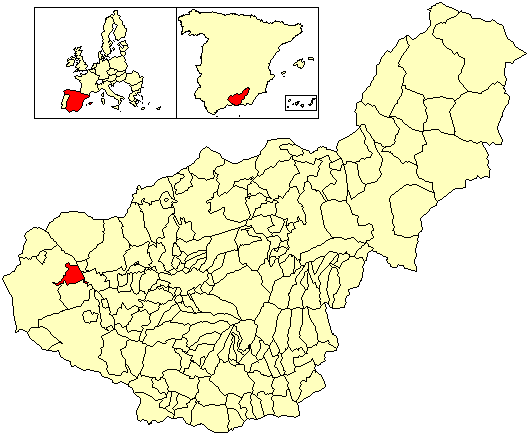
- Location of Huétor-Tájar
- Country: Spain
- Province: Granada

Government
  - Mayor: Fernando Delgado Ayén (PSOE)

Area
  - Total: 40 km^{2} (15 sq mi)
- Elevation: 484 m (1,588 ft)

Population (2025-01-01)
  - Total: 10,749
  - Density: 270/km^{2} (700/sq mi)
- Time zone: UTC+1 (CET)
  - Summer (DST): UTC+2 (CEST)
- Postal code: 18360
- Area code: 34 (Spain) + 958 (Granada)
- Website: www.huetortajar.org (in Spanish)

Huétor-Tájar (or Huétor Tájar) is a municipality and town located in the province of Granada (Andalusia), in southern Spain. It is situated 43 km west of the city of Granada, and its population in 2007 was 9,467. The municipality's extension is close to 40 km^{2}. Huétor-Tájar lies within the fertile Genil river valley, a part of the Granada depression.

The main source of income is the asparagus culture and its commercialisation under the Geographical Indication Esparragos de Huétor-Tájar.

The town is located near Granada, which has had a significant influence on it during the centuries.

== Notable people ==
- Lola Índigo (born 1992), singer and dancer

== See also ==
- List of municipalities in Granada
