= Bollullos Par del Condado =

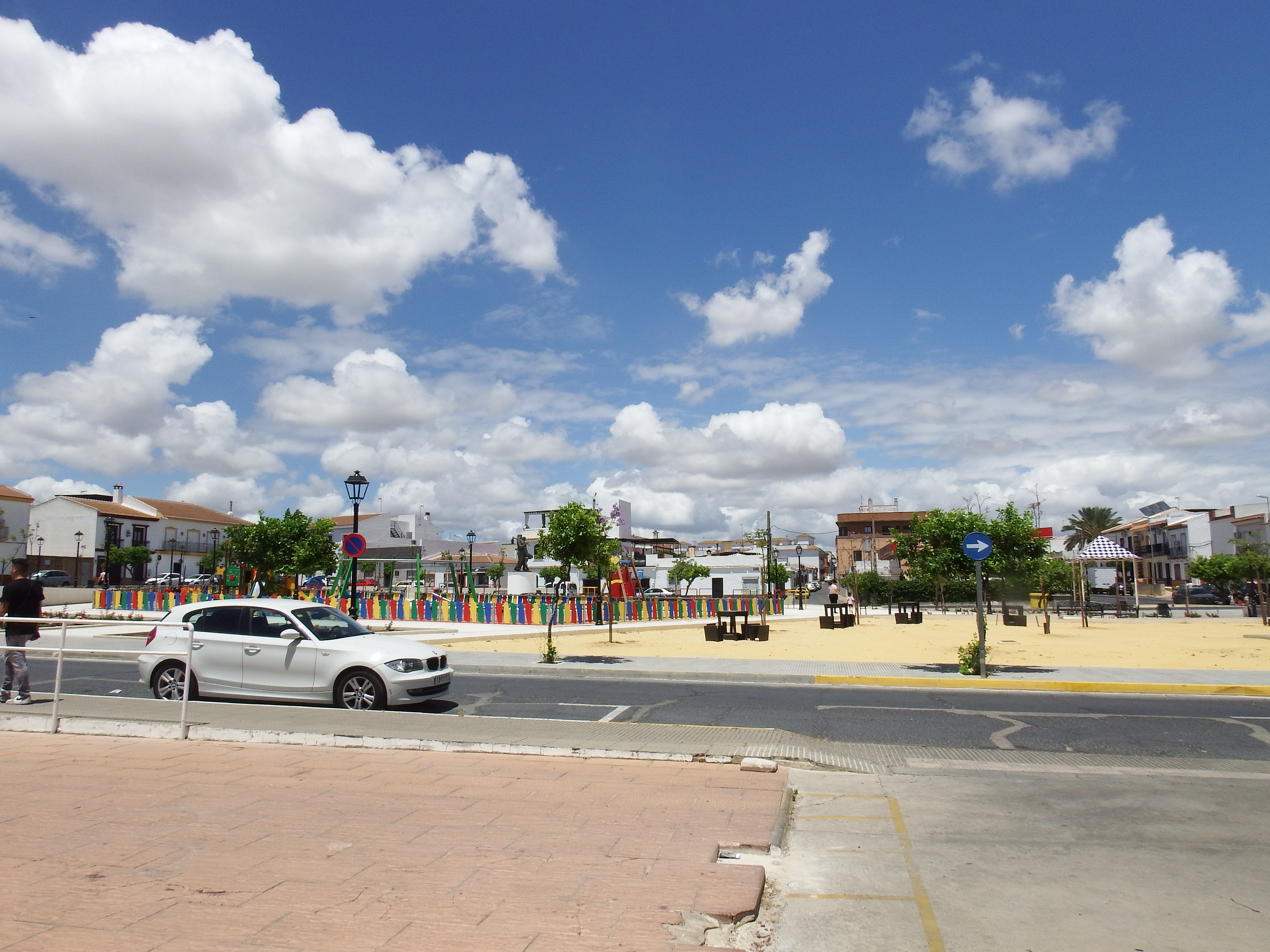

- Flag Coat of arms

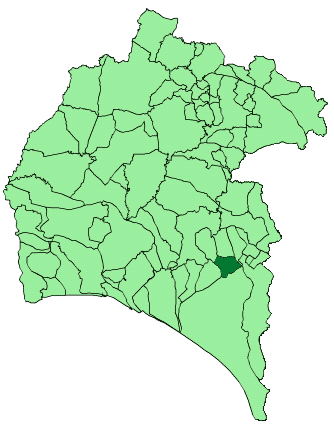
- Location of Bollullos Par del Condado

- Location within Province of Huelva Location within Andalusia Location within Spain
- Coordinates: 37°20′09″N 6°32′11″W
- Country: Spain
- Region: Andalusia
- Province: Huelva
- Municipality: Bollullos Par del Condado

Government
  - Mayor: Juan Carlos Sánchez Álvarez

Area
  - Total: 50 km^{2} (19 sq mi)
  - Land: 50 km^{2} (19 sq mi)
  - Water: 0.00 km^{2} (0 sq mi)

Population (2025-01-01)
  - Total: 14,314
  - Density: 290/km^{2} (740/sq mi)
- Time zone: UTC+1 (CET)
  - Summer (DST): UTC+2 (CEST)

Bollullos Par del Condado is a town and municipality located in the province of Huelva, Spain. According to the 2025 municipal register, it has a population of 14,314 inhabitants and covers a 50 km² area.

== Demographics ==
Historical population
Year	Pop.	±%
1999	12,727	—
2000	12,822	+0.7%
2001	12,872	+0.4%
2002	12,965	+0.7%
2003	13,041	+0.6%
2004	13,143	+0.8%
2005	13,335	+1.5%
Source: INE (Spain)

== See also ==
- List of municipalities in Huelva
