= Varea, La Rioja =

Varea
- Populated place
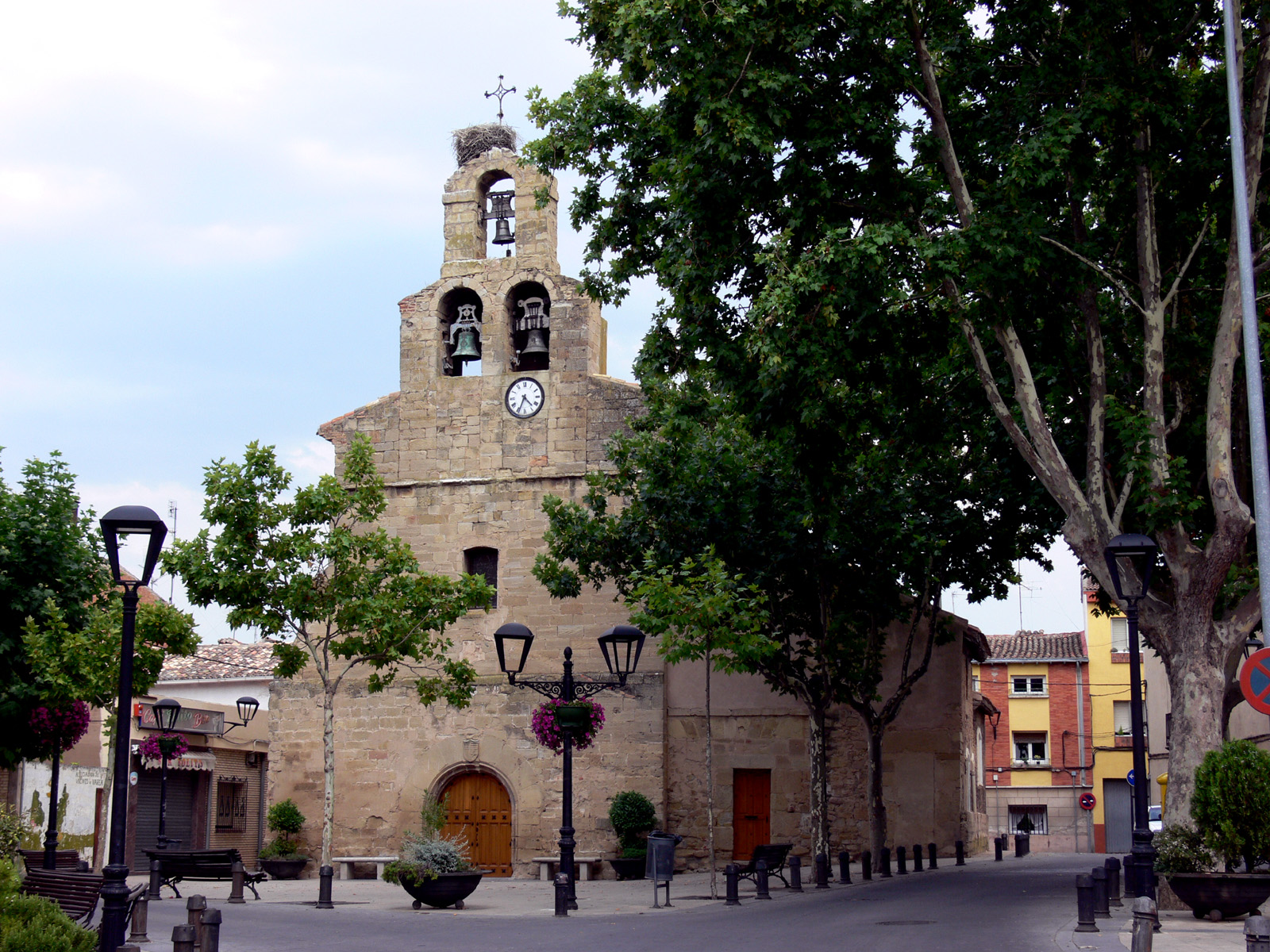
- Church of San Cosme and San Damián

- Location within La Rioja, Spain Location within Spain
- Country: Spain
- Autonomous community: La Rioja
- Comarca: Logroño

Population
  - Total: 1,866
- Postal code: 26133

Varea is a village in the municipality of Logroño, in the province and autonomous community of La Rioja, Spain. As of 2018 it had a population of 1866 people.
