= 2015–16 Copa Federación de España =

Copa RFEF

Tournament details
- Country: Spain

Final positions
- Champions: At. Baleares
- Runners-up: Rayo Majadahonda

The 2015–16 Copa Federación de España was the 23rd edition of the Copa Federación de España, also known as Copa RFEF, a knockout competition for Spanish football clubs in Segunda División B and Tercera División. At. Baleares defeated Rayo Majadahonda 3–2 on aggregate in the final.

The champion won the trophy, a cash prize of €90,152 and the qualification for the next year tournament. The runner-up received a cash prize of €30,051 and every semifinalist €12,020. Additionally, each winner of autonomous community tournament received €3,005.

The competition started 29 July 2015 with Asturias tournament and finished 13 April 2016 with the final of national phase.

== Autonomous Communities tournaments ==
=== West Andalusia and Ceuta tournament ===
==== Final ====
Team 1	Agg.	Team 2	1st leg	2nd leg
Lebrijana	2–1	Gerena	1–0	1–1

2 September 2015	Lebrijana	1–0	Gerena	Lebrija, Seville
21:00	Carlitos 32'			Stadium: Municipal

23 September 2015	Gerena	1–1	Lebrijana	Gerena, Seville
19:30	Plata 36'	Report	Falcón 23'	Stadium: José Juan Romero Gil

=== East Andalusia and Melilla tournament ===
==== Final ====
Team 1	Agg.	Team 2	1st leg	2nd leg
Loja	2–3	Granada B	1–1	1–2

9 September 2015	Loja	1–1	Granada B	Loja, Granada
20:30	Cazorla 58'	Report	Jaadi 90+4'	Stadium: Medina Lauxa; Attendance: 200

23 September 2015	Granada B	2–1	Loja	Armilla, Granada
17:30	Denilson 7'; Álex Carmona 22' (pen.)	Report	Javi del Moral 77'	Stadium: Ciudad Deportiva de Armilla

=== Aragon tournament ===
==== Quarter-finals ====
Team 1	Score	Team 2
Cuarte	0–2	Zaragoza B
Sariñena	2–0	Almudévar
Borja	2–2 (pen.)	Tarazona
Andorra	2–2 (pen.)	Teruel

8 August 2015	Cuarte	0–2	Zaragoza B	Cuarte de Huerva, Zaragoza
11:00		Report	Xiscu 50'; Aparicio 80'	Stadium: Municipal

8 August 2015	Sariñena	2–0	Almudévar	Sariñena, Huesca
19:00	Rafita 18'; Pedro Lozano 25'			Stadium: El Carmen

9 August 2015	Borja	2–2 (5–4 p)	Tarazona	Borja, Zaragoza
19:00	Jonathan Resa 11'; Álvaro Moreno 62'	Report	Javier Aranda (o.g.); Andrés Barón 89'	Stadium: Manuel Meler

9 August 2015	Andorra	2–2 (3–4 p)	Teruel	Andorra, Teruel
18:45	Adrián Terre 12'; Visanzay 25'		Adrián Barba 41'; Sergio Laguarta 82'	Stadium: Juan Antonio Endeiza

==== Semifinals ====
Team 1	Score	Team 2
Sariñena	1–1 (pen.)	Borja
Zaragoza B	1–2	Teruel

16 August 2015	Sariñena	1–1 (5–4 p)	Borja	Sariñena, Huesca
18:30	David Martínez (o.g.) 31'	Report	Carraco 2'	Stadium: El Carmen

16 August 2015	Zaragoza B	1–2	Teruel	Zaragoza
11:30	Rubén Peña 65'	Report	Monforte (penalty missed) 5'; Edu Silva 7'; Pérez Rubio 19'	Stadium: Ciudad Deportiva

==== Final ====
Team 1	Score	Team 2
Teruel	0–0 (pen.)	Sariñena

22 August 2015	Teruel	0–0 (3–4 p)	Sariñena	Teruel
18:30		Report		Stadium: Pinilla

=== Asturias tournament ===
==== Qualifying tournament ====
===== Group A =====
Team	Pld	W	D	L	GF	GA	GD	Pts
Marino (A)	4	2	1	1	3	2	+1	7
Avilés	4	2	1	1	5	2	+3	7
Ceares	4	1	0	3	1	5	−4	3

(A) Advance to a further round

29 July 2015	Avilés	2–0	Ceares	Avilés
19:15	Otero 66'; Fidalgo 70'	Report		Stadium: Román Suárez Puerta; Attendance: 280

2 August 2015	Ceares	0–1	Marino	Gijón
19:15		Report	Riki (penalty missed) 30'; Juanín 74'	Stadium: La Cruz; Attendance: 250

5 August 2015	Marino	1–0	Avilés	Luanco, Gozón
19:30	Pablo Hernández 81' (pen.)	Report		Stadium: Miramar; Attendance: 400

9 August 2015	Ceares	0–2	Avilés	Gijón
19:00		Report	Matías 39'; Luismi 72'	Stadium: La Cruz; Attendance: 150

12 August 2015	Marino	0–1	Ceares	Luanco, Gozón
19:00		Report	Ponte 75'	Stadium: Miramar; Attendance: 263

16 August 2015	Avilés	1–1	Marino	Avilés
19:00	Luismi 32'	Report	Riki 49'	Stadium: Román Suárez Puerta; Attendance: 500

===== Group B =====
Team	Pld	W	D	L	GF	GA	GD	Pts
Oviedo B (A)	4	2	2	0	7	5	+2	8
Lealtad	4	1	3	0	8	5	+3	6
Urraca	4	0	1	3	6	11	−5	1

(A) Advance to a further round

29 July 2015	Lealtad	4–1	Urraca	Villaviciosa
19:30	Pablo Espina 5' 12' 15'; Villanueva 90+2'	Report	Chus 8'	Stadium: Las Callejas; Attendance: 275

2 August 2015	Urraca	1–2	Oviedo B	Posada de Llanes, Llanes
19:30	Chus 13'	Report	Steven Prieto 44'; Juan Steven 90+2'	Stadium: La Corredoria

5 August 2015	Oviedo B	1–1	Lealtad	Oviedo
16:30	Lucas 2'	Report	Pedro Beda 45' (pen.)	Stadium: El Requexón; Attendance: 250

9 August 2015	Urraca	2–2	Lealtad	Posada de Llanes, Llanes
19:00	Sergio 57'; Langarica 60'	Report	Pablo Espina 11'; Álex 24'	Stadium: La Corredoria; Attendance: 260

12 August 2015	Oviedo B	3–2	Urraca	Oviedo
19:00	David González 4'; Castiello 40'; Asier 86'	Report	Langarica 62'; Naredo 74'	Stadium: El Requexón; Attendance: 125

15 August 2015	Lealtad	1–1	Oviedo B	Villaviciosa
19:00	Riki 83'	Report	Viti 89'	Stadium: Nuevo Villazón; Attendance: 200

===== Group C =====
Team	Pld	W	D	L	GF	GA	GD	Pts
Caudal (A)	4	4	0	0	14	1	+13	12
Llanes	4	1	1	2	3	9	−6	4
Sporting B	4	0	1	3	2	9	−7	1

(A) Advance to a further round

29 July 2015	Sporting B	1–1	Llanes	Gijón
19:00	Bertín 58'	Report	Jorge 47'	Stadium: Mareo; Attendance: 150

1 August 2015	Llanes	0–2	Caudal	Llanes
19:00		Report	Annunziata 57' (pen.); Invernón 80'	Stadium: San José; Attendance: 100

5 August 2015	Caudal	3–1	Sporting B	Mieres
20:00	Iván Fernández 29'; Invernón 52'; Annunziata (penalty missed) 57'; Javi Gutiérrez 86'	Report	Juan Mera 36'	Stadium: Hermanos Antuña; Attendance: 200

9 August 2015	Llanes	2–0	Sporting B	Llanes
19:00	Alonso 43' (pen.); Bruno 87'	Report		Stadium: San José; Attendance: 100

12 August 2015	Caudal	6–0	Llanes	Mieres
19:45	Llerandi 25' 31'; Pelayo (o.g.); Damián 49' 78'; Jaime 68'	Report		Stadium: Hermanos Antuña; Attendance: 200

16 August 2015	Sporting B	0–3	Caudal	Gijón
12:00		Report	Invernón 55'; Damián 64'; Annunziata 84'	Stadium: Mareo; Attendance: 200

===== Group D =====
Team	Pld	W	D	L	GF	GA	GD	Pts
Tuilla (A)	4	2	1	1	8	3	+5	7
Langreo	4	2	1	1	6	6	0	7
Covadonga	4	1	0	3	5	10	−5	3

(A) Advance to a further round

29 July 2015	Langreo	2–1	Covadonga	La Felguera, Langreo
19:30	Berto Cayarga 6'; Claudio 62'	Report	David González 90+1'	Stadium: Ganzábal; Attendance: 200

1 August 2015	Covadonga	2–1	Tuilla	Oviedo
19:00	Diego 50'; Negredo 67'	Report	Raúl 30'	Stadium: Juan Antonio Álvarez Rabanal; Attendance: 150

5 August 2015	Tuilla	3–1	Langreo	Tuilla, Langreo
19:30	Fran Meji 15' 39' 83'	Report	Nacho Calvillo 45'	Stadium: El Candín; Attendance: 200

8 August 2015	Covadonga	2–3	Langreo	Oviedo
19:00	Mikel 8'; Jordi 71'	Report	Pelayo 21'; Claudio 63'; Luis Nuño 90'	Stadium: Juan Antonio Álvarez Rabanal, Attendance: 200

12 August 2015	Tuilla	4–0	Covadonga	Tuilla, Langreo
19:30	Villa 21'; Fran Meji 38'; Cris 43'; Álvaro Pozo 49'	Report		Stadium: El Candín; Attendance: 150

15 August 2015	Langreo	0–0	Tuilla	La Felguera, Langreo
19:00		Report		Stadium: Ganzábal; Attendance: 400

==== Semifinals ====
Team 1	Agg.	Team 2	1st leg	2nd leg
Marino	2–1	Oviedo B	0–0	2–1
Caudal	1–2	Tuilla	0–1	1–1

26 August 2015	Marino	0–0	Oviedo B	Luanco, Gozón
19:00		Report		Stadium: Miramar; Attendance: 350

26 August 2015	Caudal	0–1	Tuilla	Mieres
19:30		Report	Álvaro Pozo 31'	Stadium: Hermanos Antuña; Attendance: 500

9 September 2015	Oviedo B	1–2	Marino	Oviedo
16:30	Allyson 86'	Report	José Ángel 42'; Guaya 57'	Stadium: El Requexón; Attendance: 200

9 September 2015	Tuilla	1–1	Caudal	Tuilla, Langreo
19:30	Saavedra (o.g.)	Report	Javi Sánchez 10'	Stadium: El Candín; Attendance: 450

==== Final ====
Team 1	Score	Team 2
Marino	1–0	Tuilla

- Neutral venue

8 October 2015	Marino	1–0	Tuilla	Mieres
20:00	Geni 70'	Report		Stadium: Hermanos Antuña; Attendance: 600

=== Balearic Islands tournament ===
==== First round ====
Team 1	Agg.	Team 2	1st leg	2nd leg
Llosetense	7–3	Constància	5–1	2–2
At. Baleares	3–2	Mallorca B	2–1	1–1

Peña Deportiva and Mercadal received a bye.

2 September 2015	Llosetense	5–1	Constància	Lloseta, Majorca
19:00	Rigo 46' 55'; Bibi 50'; Regis 60'; Nico Baleani 87'	Report	Jaime Hernández 73' (pen.)	Stadium: Municipal

2 September 2015	At. Baleares	2–1	Mallorca B	Palma, Majorca
19:30	Rodri 11'; Jaime Hernández 73' (pen.)	Report	Baba 88'	Stadium: Son Malferit; Attendance: 1.000

9 September 2015	Constància	2–2	Llosetense	Inca, Majorca
19:00	Tomeu 10'; Bueno 35'	Report	Lirola 44' (pen.); Regis 87'	Stadium: Nou Camp

9 September 2015	Mallorca B	1–1	At. Baleares	Palma, Majorca
19:00	Mateu Ferrer 52'	Report	Rodri 45'	Stadium: Son Bibiloni

==== Semifinals ====
Team 1	Agg.	Team 2	1st leg	2nd leg
Llosetense	2–2 (pen.)	At. Baleares	2–0	0–2
Peña Deportiva	4–0	Mercadal	2–0	2–0

16 September 2015	Llosetense	2–0	At. Baleares	Lloseta, Majorca
18:30	Regis 5' 47'	Report		Stadium: Municipal

16 September 2015	Peña Deportiva	2–0	Mercadal	Santa Eulària des Riu, Ibiza
17:00	Borja Pando 37'; Rubo 41'	Report		Stadium: Municipal

23 September 2015	At. Baleares	2–0 (5–4 p.)	Llosetense	Palma, Majorca
19:00	Malik 72' 79'	Report		Stadium: Son Malferit; Attendance: 500

23 September 2015	Mercadal	0–2	Peña Deportiva	Es Mercadal, Menorca
17:00		Report	Carlos Tomás 72'; Álex López 82'	Stadium: Sant Martí

==== Final ====
Team 1	Agg.	Team 2	1st leg	2nd leg
Peña Deportiva	3–3 (a)	At. Baleares	2–2	1–1

30 September 2015	Peña Deportiva	2–2	At. Baleares	Santa Eulària des Riu, Ibiza
16:00	David Camps 56' 75' (pen.)	Report	Kristian 24'; Rodri 26'	Stadium: Municipal; Attendance: 80

7 October 2015	At. Baleares	1–1	Peña Deportiva	Palma, Majorca
17:00	Jurado 83'	Report	Borja Pando 18' (pen.)	Stadium: Son Malferit

=== Basque Country tournament ===
==== First round ====
Team 1	Agg.	Team 2	1st leg	2nd leg
Berio	2–2 (a)	Zalla	1–0	1–2
Zamudio	3–4	Amorebieta	1–2	2–2
Balmaseda	1–2 (a.e.t.)	Alavés B	1–0	0–2

Aurrerá received a bye.

9 September 2015	Berio	1–0	Zalla	Lasarte-Oria, Gipuzkoa
19:30	Ahien Muñoz 83'			Stadium: Zubieta

8 September 2015	Zamudio	1–2	Amorebieta	Zamudio, Biscay
20:00	Revuelta		Mikel Juaristi; Goiria	Stadium: Gazituaga

9 September 2015	Balmaseda	1–0	Alavés B	Balmaseda, Biscay
20:00				Stadium: La Baluga

22 September 2015	Zalla	2–1	Berio	Zalla, Biscay
19:00	Borja Álvarez 66' 72'	Report	Odei Arrieta 60'	Stadium: Landaberri

22 September 2015	Amorebieta	2–2	Zamudio	Amorebieta, Biscay
20:00	Jorge García 58'; Ubis 70'	Report	Arman 43'; Obieta 89'	Stadium: Urritxe

23 September 2015	Alavés B	2–0 (a.e.t.)	Balmaseda	Vitoria-Gasteiz, Álava
19:00	Ibáñez; Asier Benito			Stadium: José Luis Compañón

==== Semifinals ====
Team 1	Agg.	Team 2	1st leg	2nd leg
Aurrerá	2–3 (a.e.t.)	Berio	1–1	1–2
Amorebieta	2–2 (a)	Alavés B	1–2	1–0

30 September 2015	Aurrerá	1–1	Berio	Vitoria-Gasteiz, Álava
19:30				Stadium: Olaranbe

30 September 2015	Amorebieta	1–2	Alavés B	Amorebieta, Biscay
20:00				Stadium: Urritxe

6 October 2015	Berio	2–1 (a.e.t.)	Aurrerá	Lasarte-Oria, Gipuzkoa
19:30	Manso 21' 106'	Report	Josu 24'	Stadium: Zubieta

7 October 2015	Alavés B	0–1	Amorebieta	Vitoria-Gasteiz, Álava
19:00		Report	Arriaga 85' (pen.)	Stadium: José Luis Compañón

==== Final ====
Team 1	Agg.	Team 2	1st leg	2nd leg
Berio	0–1	Alavés B	0–1	0–0

14 October 2015	Berio	0–1	Alavés B	Lasarte-Oria, Gipuzkoa
19:30			David 2'	Stadium: Zubieta

21 October 2015	Alavés B	0–0	Berio	Vitoria-Gasteiz, Álava
18:00		Report	Ahien Muñoz (penalty missed) 70'	Stadium: José Luis Compañón

=== Canary Islands tournament ===
==== Semifinal ====
Team 1	Agg.	Team 2	1st leg	2nd leg
Villa Santa Brígida	5–3	Unión Viera	2–2	3–1

Tenerife B received a bye.

23 September 2015	Villa Santa Brígida	2–2	Unión Viera	Santa Brígida, Las Palmas
20:30				Stadium: Guiniguada

30 September 2015	Unión Viera	1–3	Villa Santa Brígida	Las Palmas
21:00	Christian Barrios 16'	Report	Brandon Torres 9'; Carreño 21' (pen.); Santi 63'	Stadium: Alfonso Silva; Attendance: 100

==== Final ====
Team 1	Agg.	Team 2	1st leg	2nd leg
Tenerife B	3–3 (pen.)	Villa Santa Brígida	2–1	1–2

14 October 2015	Tenerife B	2–1	Villa Santa Brígida	Santa Cruz de Tenerife
17:00				Stadium: Ciudad Deportiva de Geneto

21 October 2015	Villa Santa Brígida	2–1 (4–1 p)	Tenerife B	Santa Brígida, Las Palmas
17:00	Santi 81'; Carreño 90+3' (pen.)	Report	Bolaños 57'	Stadium: Municipal Los Olivos; Attendance: 250

=== Cantabria tournament ===
==== Quarter-finals ====
Team 1	Score	Team 2
Rayo Cantabria	0–3	Cayón
Textil Escudo	0–0 (pen.)	Racing Santander B
Revilla	0–2	Gimnástica Torrelavega
At. Albericia	1–1 (pen.)	Tropezón

- All matches in Stadium Fernando Astobiza of Cayón

13 August 2015	Rayo Cantabria	0–3	Cayón	Fernando Astobiza, Cayón
19:30		Report	Óscar Briz 43' 48'; Mier 72'

14 August 2015	Textil Escudo	0–0 (10–11 p)	Racing Santander B	Fernando Astobiza, Cayón
19:15

15 August 2015	Revilla	0–2	Gimnástica Torrelavega	Fernando Astobiza, Cayón
17:30		Report	Primo 28'; Maxi 55'

15 August 2015	At. Albericia	1–1 (4–2 p)	Tropezón	Fernando Astobiza, Cayón
19:30	Sordo 52'		Conde 86'

==== Semifinals ====
Team 1	Score	Team 2
Racing Santander B	1–1 (pen.)	Gimnástica Torrelavega
At. Albericia	0–3	Cayón

- All matches in Stadium Fernando Astobiza of Cayón

16 August 2015	Racing Santander B	1–1 (3–4 p)	Gimnástica Torrelavega	Fernando Astobiza, Cayón
17:00	Unai 67'	Report	Maxi 61'	Attendance: 200

16 August 2015	At. Albericia	0–3	Cayón	Fernando Astobiza, Cayón
19:00		Report	Diego 42'; Marcos 53'; Briz 85'

==== Final ====
Team 1	Score	Team 2
Gimnástica Torrelavega	1–0	Cayón

- Neutral venue

1 September 2015	Gimnástica Torrelavega	1–0	Cayón	El Sardinero, Santander
20:30	Marco 17'	Report		Attendance: 2.000

=== Castile and León tournament ===
==== Qualifying tournament ====
Team	Pld	W	D	L	GF	GA	GD	Pts
Ciudad Rodrigo (A)	2	2	0	0	6	1	+5	6
Villaralbo	2	1	0	1	2	5	−3	3
Zamora	2	0	0	2	0	2	−2	0

(A) Advance to a further round

10 September 2015	Ciudad Rodrigo	5–1	Villaralbo	Ciudad Rodrigo, Salamanca
21:00	Iñaki 31'; Caramelo 49' 88'; Javi Moríñigo 90'; Alberto 90+2' (pen.)	Report	Álvaro 1'	Stadium: Francisco Mateos

24 September 2015	Zamora	0–1	Ciudad Rodrigo	Zamora
20:30		Report	Marcial 33'	Stadium: Estadio Ruta de la Plata

7 October 2015	Villaralbo	1–0	Zamora	Villaralbo, Zamora
20:30	Jarabo 77'	Report		Stadium: José Fernández

=== Castile-La Mancha tournament ===
==== Semifinal ====
Team 1	Agg.	Team 2	1st leg	2nd leg
Villarrubia	2–3	Conquense	1–1	1–2

Quintanar del Rey received a bye.

9 September 2015	Villarrubia	1–1	Conquense	Villarrubia de los Ojos, Ciudad Real
	Juanan Vélez 30' (pen.)	Report	Álvaro 16' (pen.)	Stadium: Municipal

16 September 2015	Conquense	2–1	Villarrubia	Cuenca
17:00	Churre 16'; Samba 84'	Report	Revi 78'	Stadium: Nueva Fuensanta

==== Final ====
Team 1	Agg.	Team 2	1st leg	2nd leg
Quintanar del Rey	4–0	Conquense	2–0	2–0

24 September 2015	Quintanar del Rey	2–0	Conquense	Quintanar del Rey, Cuenca
20:45	Raúl González 70'; Carlos 90'	Report		Stadium: San Marcos

7 October 2015	Conquense	0–2	Quintanar del Rey	Cuenca
16:00		Report	Carrasco 69'; Carlos 77'	Stadium: Nueva Fuensanta; Attendance: 400

=== Catalonia tournament ===
==== Semifinals ====
Team 1	Agg.	Team 2	1st leg	2nd leg
L'Hospitalet	3–3 (pen.)	Badalona	2–1	1–2 (a.e.t.)
Pobla Mafumet	2–1	Espanyol B	1–1	1–0

9 September 2015	L'Hospitalet	2–1	Badalona	L'Hospitalet, Barcelona
20:00	Guzmán 88'; Raúl Torres 90' (pen.)	Report	Olmeda 57'	Stadium: La Feixa Llarga; Attendance: 250

8 September 2015	Pobla Mafumet	1–1	Espanyol B	La Pobla de Mafumet, Tarragona
20:00	Gerard Verge 38'		Marc Gual 19'	Stadium: Municipal; Attendance: 200

23 September 2015	Badalona	2–1 (a.e.t.) (6–5 p.)	L'Hospitalet	Badalona, Barcelona
18:00	Olmeda 51'; Carroza 90+4'	Report	Castell 1'	Stadium: Camp del Centenari; Attendance: 250

23 September 2015	Espanyol B	0–1	Pobla Mafumet	Sant Adrià de Besòs, Barcelona
19:00		Report	Gil Muntadas 30'	Stadium: Ciutat Esportiva Dani Jarque

==== Final ====
Team 1	Agg.	Team 2	1st leg	2nd leg
Pobla Mafumet	2–4	Badalona	1–0	1–4

7 October 2015	Pobla Mafumet	1–0	Badalona	La Pobla de Mafumet, Tarragona
19:00	Antonio Vela 90+1'			Stadium: Municipal

14 October 2015	Badalona	4–1	Pobla Mafumet	Badalona, Barcelona
17:30	Akrong 20'; Toni Lao 40'; Eugeni Valderrama 70'; Manuel Balda 85'	Report	Emaná 80' (pen.)	Stadium: Camp del Centenari

=== Extremadura tournament ===
==== First round ====
Team 1	Score	Team 2
Dep. Pacense	0–3	Badajoz
At. San José	1–2	Extremadura
Valdelacalzada	0–1	Pueblonuevo
Amanecer	0–3	Cacereño
Valdivia	2–3	Don Benito
Calamonte	1–1 (pen.)	Arroyo
Fuente de Cantos	2–3	Jerez
Santa Amalia	1–1 (pen.)	Moralo

2 August 2015	Dep. Pacense	0–3	Badajoz	Viejo Vivero, Badajoz
20:30			Abraham Pozo 34' 73'; Álex González 62' (pen.)

1 August 2015	At. San José	1–2	Extremadura	Francisco de la Hera, Almendralejo, Badajoz
21:00	Javi Asensio 43' (pen.)		Willy 47' 88'

2 August 2015	Valdelacalzada	0–1	Pueblonuevo	Municipal, Valdelacalzada, Badajoz
19:45			Chino 3'

2 August 2015	Amanecer	0–3	Cacereño	Municipal San Isidro, Sierra de Fuentes, Cáceres
20:00		Report	Martins 5'; Pablo Gállego 23'; Antonio Amaro 70'

2 August 2015	Valdivia	2–3	Don Benito	Primero de Mayo, Valdivia, Villanueva de la Serena, Badajoz
19:45	Marcos; Samu	Report	Christopher; Ramiro; Gonzalo 90+5'

5 August 2015	Calamonte	1–1 (4–5 p)	Arroyo	Municipal, Calamonte, Badajoz
21:00	Vilorta 81' (pen.)	Report	Pino 52'

2 August 2015	Fuente de Cantos	2–3	Jerez	Francisco Zurbarán, Fuente de Cantos, Badajoz
20:00	Pla 51'; Jesús Toy 80'		Víctor Aguinaco 7'; Chema 31'; Juanito de la Cruz 38'

2 August 2015	Santa Amalia	1–1 (2–4 p)	Moralo	Juan Antonio Muñoz, Medellín, Badajoz
20:00	Tienza		Yoni

==== Second round ====
Team 1	Score	Team 2
Jerez	1–1 (pen.)	Extremadura
Pueblonuevo	2–2 (pen.)	Badajoz
Arroyo	2–0	Cacereño
Don Benito	3–2	Moralo

9 August 2015	Jerez	1–1 (4–2 p)	Extremadura	Manuel Calzado Galván, Jerez de los Caballeros, Badajoz
20:30	Juanito de la Cruz 85'		Cristo 36'

8 August 2015	Pueblonuevo	2–2 (4–5 p)	Badajoz	Antonio Amaya, Pueblonuevo del Guadiana, Badajoz
21:00	Jorge Coronado 73' 82'	Report	Carreño 16' (pen.) 62'

9 August 2015	Arroyo	2–0	Cacereño	Municipal, Arroyo de la Luz, Cáceres
21:00	Antonio 28' 71'	Report

9 August 2015	Don Benito	3–2	Moralo	Las Amapolas, Valdehornillos, Badajoz
19:30	Kiko 41'; Cristo 67'; Angelito 75'		Pintado 34'; Pinilla 43'

==== Semifinals ====
Team 1	Score	Team 2
Badajoz	4–0	Jerez
Don Benito	3–2	Arroyo

16 August 2015	Badajoz	4–0	Jerez	Nuevo Vivero, Badajoz
21:00	Rober Gándara 28'; Carreño 42' 46'; Adri 67'	Report

19 August 2015	Don Benito	3–2	Arroyo	Vicente Sanz, Don Benito, Badajoz
21:00	(o.g.) 19'; Cristo 22'; Carlos 90'	Report	Antonio 6' 70'

==== Final ====
Team 1	Score	Team 2
Badajoz	2–1	Don Benito

19 September 2015	Badajoz	2–1	Don Benito	Nuevo Vivero, Badajoz
20:00	Nando Copete 1'; Chechu 50'	Report	Cristo 3'

=== Galicia tournament ===
==== Quarter-finals ====
Team 1	Score	Team 2
Cerceda	3–0	Silva
Alondras	2–1	Ribadumia
Rápido de Bouzas	2–1	Deportivo B

Coruxo and received a bye.

10 September 2015	Cerceda	3–0	Silva	Cerceda, A Coruña
20:00	Bilal Belkacha 59'; Cristian Quintas 72' 84'			Stadium: O Roxo

9 September 2015	Alondras	2–1	Ribadumia	Cangas, Pontevedra
21:00	Raúl Gil 37'; Mauro Nores 67'		Agustín Bentancor 28'	Stadium: Morrazo

9 September 2015	Rápido de Bouzas	2–1	Deportivo B	Bouzas, Vigo, Pontevedra
20:00	Gabriel Misa 36' 62' (pen.)		Francisco Domingo 25'	Stadium: Baltasar Pujales

==== Semifinals ====
Team 1	Score	Team 2
Cerceda	4–2 (a.e.t.)	Coruxo
Alondras	2–5 (a.e.t.)	Rápido de Bouzas

23 September 2015	Cerceda	4–2 (a.e.t.)	Coruxo	Cerceda, A Coruña
19:00	Popi 47'; Adrián Albelenda 89'; Capelo 104'; Tiago 114'	Report	Jorge 28'; Salinas 44' (pen.)	Stadium: O Roxo

23 September 2015	Alondras	2–5 (a.e.t.)	Rápido de Bouzas	Cangas, Pontevedra
21:15	Manuel Pereira 80'; Andrés Giráldez 89'		Marcos Pérez 17'; Youssef El Ouatani 56'; Pablo Hernández 98'; Martín López 100'; Tomás Comesaña 111'	Stadium: Morrazo

==== Final ====
Team 1	Score	Team 2
Cerceda	0–3	Rápido de Bouzas

- Neutral venue

14 October 2015	Cerceda	0–3	Rápido de Bouzas	Ribadumia, Pontevedra
20:30		Report	Martín López 11'; Carlos Pereira 35'; Gustavo Souto 43'	Stadium: A Senra

=== La Rioja tournament ===
==== Quarter-finals ====
Team 1	Score	Team 2
Haro	0–2	Náxara
SD Logroñés	3–0	At. Vianés
Agoncillo	3–1	Alfaro
La Calzada	0–0 (pen.)	Calahorra

16 August 2015	Haro	0–2	Náxara	El Mazo, Haro
19:00		Report	Martínez 85'; Lozano 90'

15 August 2015	SD Logroñés	3–0	At. Vianés	Las Gaunas, Logroño
18:30	Íñigo 38'; Candelas 46'; San Martín 79'	Report		Attendance: 500

16 August 2015	Agoncillo	3–1	Alfaro	San Roque, Agoncillo
19:00	Daniel López 14' 40'; Jorge Martínez 54'		Iliasse Boudlal 64'

16 August 2015	La Calzada	0–0 (2–4 p)	Calahorra	El Rollo, Santo Domingo de la Calzada
17:30		Report

==== Semifinals ====
Team 1	Score	Team 2
Náxara	1–2	SD Logroñés
Agoncillo	2–3	Calahorra

26 August 2015	Náxara	1–2	SD Logroñés	La Salera, Nájera
20:00	Miguel Martínez 57'	Report	Domínguez 70'; Íñigo 73'	Attendance: 500

26 August 2015	Agoncillo	2–3	Calahorra	San Roque, Agoncillo
19:30

==== Final ====
Team 1	Score	Team 2
SD Logroñés	2–2 (pen.)	Calahorra

8 September 2015	SD Logroñés	2–2 (6–5 p)	Calahorra	Mundial 82, Logroño
20:00	Íñigo 23'; Dani Suárez 70'	Report	Moisés 17'; Martínez de Quel 54'	Attendance: 700

=== Madrid tournament ===
==== Qualifying tournament ====
Team	Pld	W	D	L	GF	GA	GD	Pts
Móstoles (A)	4	2	0	2	6	5	+1	6
Alcobendas	4	2	0	2	5	5	0	6
Internacional	4	2	0	2	7	8	−1	6

(A) Advance to a further round

2 September 2015	Alcobendas	0–1	Móstoles	Alcobendas
20:30			Odera 77'	Stadium: Luis Aragonés

9 September 2015	Internacional	2–0	Alcobendas	Moraleja de Enmedio
20:30	Adrián Pérez 43'; Jaime Guadaño 59'			Stadium: Dehesa de la Villa

24 September 2015	Móstoles	4–0	Internacional	Móstoles
21:00	Koke 6'; Miguel del Puerto 33'; Fede Prieto 57'; David Aguilar 81'	Report		Stadium: El Soto; Attendance: 70

7 October 2015	Móstoles	0–2	Alcobendas	Móstoles
20:00			Jeisson Martínez 55'; Marcos Sartor 85'	Stadium: El Soto

14 October 2015	Alcobendas	3–2	Internacional	Alcobendas
20:30	David Murciego 64'; Raúl Hernández 80'; Manuel Jaimez 85'		Adrián Pérez 69'; Daniel García 78'	Stadium: Luis Aragonés

21 October 2015	Internacional	3–1	Móstoles	Moraleja de Enmedio
20:30	David Sanz 5'; Roberto Miguel Jiménez 73'; Manuel Sánchez 79'	Report	Odera 32'	Stadium: Dehesa de la Villa

=== Murcia tournament ===
==== First round ====
Team 1	Agg.	Team 2	1st leg	2nd leg
Churra	2–3	Mar Menor	1–0	1–3
Plus Ultra	1–3	Alhama	1–2	0–1
Lorca	6–1	Espinardo Nueva Vanguardia	5–1	1–0
Ciudad de Murcia	3–7	El Palmar	1–4	2–3

16 September 2015	Churra	1–0	Mar Menor	Churra
21:30				Stadium: Municipal

16 September 2015	Plus Ultra	1–2	Alhama	Llano de Brujas
21:00				Stadium: Municipal

16 September 2015	Lorca	5–1	Espinardo Nueva Vanguardia	Lorca
21:00	Asensio 6'; Campanas 42' 53'; Guille 74'; Piojo 82'	Report	Salinas 39'	Stadium: Ciudad Deportiva de la Torrecilla

16 September 2015	Ciudad de Murcia	1–4	El Palmar	Murcia
21:30				Stadium: José Barnés

30 September 2015	Mar Menor	3–1	Churra	San Javier
21:00				Stadium: Pitín

30 September 2015	Alhama	1–0	Plus Ultra	Alhama de Murcia
19:30				Stadium: José María Soriano

30 September 2015	Espinardo Nueva Vanguardia	0–1	Lorca	Alcantarilla
20:45				Stadium: Ángel Sornichero

30 September 2015	El Palmar	3–2	Ciudad de Murcia	El Palmar, Murcia
20:45				Stadium: Municipal

==== Semifinals ====
Team 1	Agg.	Team 2	1st leg	2nd leg
Alhama	4–3	Mar Menor	2–1	2–2
Lorca	2–1	El Palmar	2–1	0–0

7 October 2015	Alhama	2–1	Mar Menor	Alhama de Murcia
20:00	Paco Lorca 13'; Campanas 42'		Naranjo 59'	Stadium: Guadalentín

7 October 2015	Lorca	2–1	El Palmar	Lorca
21:00				Stadium: Ciudad Deportiva de la Torrecilla

14 October 2015	Mar Menor	2–2	Alhama	San Javier
21:00	Valdeolivas 12'; Ñiles 72'	Report	Adrián 80' (pen.) 90+3'	Stadium: Pitín

14 October 2015	El Palmar	0–0	Lorca	El Palmar, Murcia
21:00				Stadium: Municipal

==== Final ====
Team 1	Score	Team 2
Alhama	1–2	Lorca

- Neutral venue

21 October 2015	Alhama	1–2	Lorca	Totana
20:30	Julen 7'	Report	Asensio 31' (pen.); Carrasco 69' (pen.)	Stadium: Juan Cayuela; Attendance: 1.000

=== Navarre tournament ===
==== Qualifying tournament ====
Group A

Team	Pld	W	D	L	GF	GA	GD	Pts
Osasuna B (A)	2	2	0	0	5	0	+5	6
Pamplona	2	0	1	1	1	3	−2	1
Beti Onak	2	0	1	1	1	4	−3	1

(A) Advance to a further round

Team 1	Score	Team 2
Pamplona	0–2	Osasuna B
Osasuna B	3–0	Beti Onak
Beti Onak	1–1	Pamplona

5 August 2015	Pamplona	0–2	Osasuna B	Lizasoain, Pamplona
19:45			Jaime Dios 57' 66'

12 August 2015	Osasuna B	3–0	Beti Onak	Tajonar, Pamplona
19:00	Berruezo; Jaime Dios; Naser

18 August 2015	Beti Onak	1–1	Pamplona	Escuela de Peritos, Villava
20:00

Group B

Team	Pld	W	D	L	GF	GA	GD	Pts
Valle de Egüés (A)	2	1	1	0	4	2	+2	4
Burladés	2	1	1	0	3	2	+1	4
Chantrea	2	0	0	2	2	5	−3	0

(A) Advance to a further round

Team 1	Score	Team 2
Chantrea	1–2	Burladés
Burladés	1–1	Valle de Egüés
Valle de Egüés	3–1	Chantrea

5 August 2015	Chantrea	1–2	Burladés	Chantrea, Pamplona
19:30

12 August 2015	Burladés	1–1	Valle de Egüés	Ripagaina, Burlada
20:15

17 August 2015	Valle de Egüés	3–1	Chantrea

Group C

Team	Pld	W	D	L	GF	GA	GD	Pts
Iruña (A)	2	1	1	0	5	2	+3	4
Mutilvera (A)	2	1	1	0	4	3	+1	4
Itaroa Huarte	2	0	0	2	1	5	−4	0

(A) Advance to a further round

Team 1	Score	Team 2
Mutilvera	2–1	Itaroa Huarte
Itaroa Huarte	0–3	Iruña
Iruña	2–2	Mutilvera

4 August 2015	Mutilvera	2–1	Itaroa Huarte	Valle Aranguren, Mutilva Baja, Aranguren
20:15

12 August 2015	Itaroa Huarte	0–3	Iruña	Areta, Huarte
20:00

18 August 2015	Iruña	2–2	Mutilvera	Tajonar, Pamplona
19:45

==== Semifinals ====
Team 1	Agg.	Team 2	1st leg	2nd leg
Iruña	0–7	Mutilvera	0–5	0–2
Osasuna B	4–5	Valle de Egüés	2–1	2–4

9 September 2015	Iruña	0–5	Mutilvera	Tajonar, Pamplona
19:45

8 September 2015	Osasuna B	2–1	Valle de Egüés	Tajonar, Pamplona
20:00

15 September 2015	Mutilvera	2–0	Iruña	Mutilnova, Mutilva Baja, Aranguren
20:00

15 September 2015	Valle de Egüés	4–2	Osasuna B	Sarriguren
20:00	Legarra 46'; Sierra 65' (pen.); Jon 75'; Goren 90+1'		Carlos 5' (pen.) 60'

==== Final ====
Team 1	Score	Team 2
Mutilvera	3–4 (a.e.t.)	Valle de Egüés

- Neutral venue

22 September 2015	Mutilvera	3–4 (a.e.t.)	Valle de Egüés	Tajonar, Pamplona
20:00

=== Valencian Community tournament ===
==== First round ====
Team 1	Agg.	Team 2	1st leg	2nd leg
Acero	1–6	Alzira	1–2	0–4

Elche Ilicitano, Ontinyent and Torre Levante received a bye.

26 August 2015	Acero	1–2	Alzira	Sagunto, Valencia
20:00	Sanfeliu 90'	Report	Gabri 43'; Brian 88'	Stadium: El Fornàs

2 September 2015	Alzira	4–0	Acero	Alzira, Valencia
20:00	Luis García 4'; Brian 5'; Hervás 9'; Fran Jiménez 90+2'	Report		Stadium: Luis Suñer

==== Semifinals ====
Team 1	Agg.	Team 2	1st leg	2nd leg
Torre Levante	1–3	Alzira	0–2	1–1
Ontinyent	3–3 (a)	Elche Ilicitano	1–3	2–0

30 September 2015	Torre Levante	0–2	Alzira	Valencia
19:30		Report	Mauro Melo 80'; Brian 83' (pen.)	Stadium: Orriols

30 September 2015	Ontinyent	1–3	Elche Ilicitano	Ontinyent, Valencia
20:00	Lucas 57'	Report	Liberto 53'; Tobi 72'; Kilian 74'	Stadium: El Clariano

7 October 2015	Alzira	1–1	Torre Levante	Alzira, Valencia
20:30	Brian 51'	Report	More 71'	Stadium: Luis Suñer; Attendance: 200

7 October 2015	Elche Ilicitano	0–2	Ontinyent	Elche, Alicante
17:00		Report	Marc 60'; Álex Chico 75' (pen.)	Stadium: Díez Iborra

==== Final ====
Team 1	Agg.	Team 2	1st leg	2nd leg
Alzira	1–2	Elche Ilicitano	0–1	1–1

21 October 2015	Alzira	0–1	Elche Ilicitano	Alzira, Valencia
20:30		Report	Molina 15'	Stadium: Luis Suñer; Attendance: 300

28 October 2015	Elche Ilicitano	1–1	Alzira	Elche, Alicante
18:00	Primi 90+2'	Report	Bryan 77'	Stadium: Díez Iborra; Attendance: 300

== National phase ==
National phase began 2 December 2015.

-(3) Team playing in 2015–16 Segunda División B (third level in Spanish football)

-(4) Team playing in 2015–16 Tercera División (fourth level in Spanish football)

-(DNP) Team renounced to play

Qualified teams

Defending champion

- (Basque Country (autonomous community)) Real Unión (3)

Teams losing Copa del Rey first round

- (Galicia (Spain)) Compostela (3)
- (Galicia (Spain)) Pontevedra (3)
- (Asturias) Condal (4)
- (Cantabria) Racing Santander (3) (DNP)
- (Basque Country (autonomous community)) Portugalete (3) (DNP)
- (Catalonia) Ascó (4)
- (Catalonia) Sabadell (3)
- (Valencian Community) Alcoyano (3) (DNP)
- (Valencian Community) Hércules (3) (DNP)
- (Community of Madrid) Rayo Majadahonda (3)
- Melilla (3) (DNP)
- (Andalusia) Recreativo (3) (DNP)
- (Region of Murcia) Jumilla (3)
- (Region of Murcia) Murcia (3) (DNP)
- (Extremadura) Mérida (3)
- (La Rioja) Varea (4) (DNP)
- (Castilla–La Mancha) Guadalajara (3)

Winners of Autonomous Communities tournaments

- (Aragon) Sariñena (4)
- (Cantabria) Gimnástica Torrelavega (4)
- (La Rioja) SD Logroñés (4)
- (Extremadura) Badajoz (4)
- (Navarre) Valle de Egüés (4)
- (Andalusia) Granada B (3)
- (Andalusia) Lebrijana (4)
- (Castile and León) Ciudad Rodrigo (4)
- (Castilla–La Mancha) Quintanar del Rey (4)
- (Balearic Islands) At. Baleares (3)
- (Asturias) Marino (4)
- (Catalonia) Badalona (3)
- (Galicia (Spain)) Rápido de Bouzas (4)
- (Basque Country (autonomous community)) Alavés B (4)
- (Canary Islands) Villa Santa Brígida (4)
- (Region of Murcia) Lorca (4)
- (Community of Madrid) Móstoles (4)
- (Valencian Community) Elche Ilicitano (4)

=== Round of 32 ===
The draw for the first round was held on November 3. Round of 32 was played between 2 and 17 December 2015.

Team 1	Agg.	Team 2	1st leg	2nd leg
Pontevedra (3) (Galicia (Spain))	2–0	(Asturias) Marino (4)	1–0	1–0
Compostela (3) (Galicia (Spain))	1–1 (a)	(Cantabria) Gimnástica Torrelavega (4)	1–1	0–0
Rápido de Bouzas (4) (Galicia (Spain))	3–1 (a.e.t.)	(Castile and León) Ciudad Rodrigo (4)	1–0	2–1 (a.e.t.)
Real Unión (3) (Basque Country (autonomous community))	1–2	(Community of Madrid) Rayo Majadahonda (3)	0–0	1–2
Guadalajara (3) (Castilla–La Mancha)	2–1	(Basque Country (autonomous community)) Alavés B (4)	1–0	1–1
Valle de Egüés (4) (Navarre)	1–9	(Community of Madrid) Móstoles (4)	1–4	0–5
Sabadell (3) (Catalonia)	3–3 (a)	(Valencian Community) Elche Ilicitano (4)	2–2	1–1
At. Baleares (3) (Balearic Islands)	1–0 (a.e.t.)	(Catalonia) Badalona (3)	0–0	1–0 (a.e.t.)
Sariñena (4) (Aragon)	3–1 (a.e.t.)	(Catalonia) Ascó (4)	1–0	2–1 (a.e.t.)
Jumilla (3) (Region of Murcia)	1–4	(Extremadura) Mérida (3)	1–3	0–1
Granada B (3) (Andalusia)	3–5	(Extremadura) Badajoz (4)	2–4	1–1
Lebrijana (4) (Andalusia)	0–1	(Castilla–La Mancha) Quintanar del Rey (4)	0–1	0–0

(Asturias) Condal (4), (La Rioja) SD Logroñés (4), (Canary Islands) Villa Santa Brígida (4) and (Region of Murcia) Lorca (4) received a bye.

==== First leg ====
3 December 2015
20:30

Pontevedra	1–0	Marino
Miki 78'	Report

Pasarón, Pontevedra
Attendance: 400
2 December 2015
20:00

Compostela	1–1	Gimnástica Torrelavega
Chiño 79'	Report	Jony 7'

San Lázaro, Santiago de Compostela, A Coruña
3 December 2015
21:00

Rápido de Bouzas	1–0	Ciudad Rodrigo
Carlos Pereira 68'	Report

Baltasar Pujales, Bouzas, Vigo, Pontevedra
2 December 2015
19:30

Real Unión	0–0	Rayo Majadahonda
	Report

Gal, Irun, Gipuzkoa
Attendance: 100
2 December 2015
20:00

Guadalajara	1–0	Alavés B
Edipo 79'	Report

Pedro Escartín, Guadalajara
Attendance: 150
3 December 2015
16:30

Valle de Egüés	1–4	Móstoles
Edu Lanz 40'	Report	Gorro 2'; Catena 53'; Mario Duque 60'; Odera 70'

Sarriguren, Egüés, Navarre
3 December 2015
20:00

Sabadell	2–2	Elche Ilicitano
Forgas 34' (pen.); Sandro 57'	Report	Iván Agudo 31'; Nuha 77'

Nova Creu Alta, Sabadell, Barcelona
2 December 2015
16:30

At. Baleares	0–0	Badalona
	Report

Son Malferit, Palma, Majorca
Attendance: 678
5 December 2015
15:30

Sariñena	1–0	Ascó
Lucho 9'	Report

El Carmen, Sariñena, Huesca
2 December 2015
20:15

Jumilla	1–3	Mérida
Víctor 64'	Report	Aitor 53' 72'; Gonzalo 67'

Municipal de la Hoya, Jumilla, Murcia
3 December 2015
15:45

Granada B	2–4	Badajoz
Matheus 44' (pen.) 87'	Report	Kiko 5'; Kike Carreño 23'; Copete 33'; Abraham 42'

Ciudad Deportiva de Armilla, Armilla, Granada
Attendance: 300
2 December 2015
19:30

Lebrijana	0–1	Quintanar del Rey
		75'

Municipal, Lebrija, Seville

==== Second leg ====
16 December 2015
20:00

Marino	0–1	Pontevedra
	Report	Carnero 62'

Miramar, Luanco, Asturias
Attendance: 238

Pontevedra won 2–0 on aggregate

16 December 2015
20:00

Gimnástica Torrelavega	0–0	Compostela
	Report

El Malecón, Torrelavega, Cantabria

Gimnástica Torrelavega won 1–1 on away goals rule

17 December 2015
20:45

Ciudad Rodrigo	1–2 (a.e.t.)	Rápido de Bouzas
Risueño 19'	Report	Pereira 103' (pen.); Tomás 110'

Francisco Mateos, Ciudad Rodrigo, Salamanca

Rápido de Bouzas won 3–1 on aggregate after extra time

16 December 2015
19:30

Rayo Majadahonda	2–1	Real Unión
Rubén Blanco 36'; Borja Acha 41'	Report	Mújika 19'

Cerro del Espino, Majadahonda, Madrid

Rayo Majadahonda won 2–1 on aggregate

16 December 2015
16:00

Alavés B	1–1	Guadalajara
Joseba 48'		Javier Ablanque 15'

José Luis Compañón, Vitoria-Gasteiz, Álava

Guadalajara won 2–1 on aggregate

17 December 2015
17:00

Móstoles	5–0	Valle de Egüés
Mario Duque 25'; Aitor 43'; Odera 51' 89'; Dani Gail 81'	Report

El Soto, Móstoles, Madrid

Móstoles won 9–1 on aggregate

16 December 2015
16:30

Elche Ilicitano	1–1	Sabadell
Iván Agudo 41' (pen.)	Report	Forgas 17' (pen.)

Isabel Fernández, Elche, Alicante
Attendance: 300

Elche Ilicitano won 3–3 on away goals rule

16 December 2015
16:00

Badalona	0–1 (a.e.t.)	At. Baleares
	Report	Jaime Hernández 112' (pen.)

Camp del Centenari, Badalona, Barcelona
Attendance: 150

At. Baleares won 1–0 on aggregate after extra time

16 December 2015
20:00

Ascó	1–2 (a.e.t.)	Sariñena
José Ramón 18'	Report	Asin 97'; Lucho 113'

Municipal, Ascó, Tarragona

Sariñena won 3–1 on aggregate after extra time

16 December 2015
20:15

Mérida	1–0	Jumilla
Aitor 87' (pen.)	Report

Estadio Romano, Mérida, Badajoz

Mérida won 4–1 on aggregate

16 December 2015
20:45

Badajoz	1–1	Granada B
Jesús 80'	Report	Clifford 2'

Nuevo Vivero, Badajoz

Badajoz won 5–3 on aggregate

16 December 2015
19:30

Quintanar del Rey	0–0	Lebrijana
	Report

San Marcos, Quintanar del Rey, Cuenca

Quintanar del Rey won 1–0 on aggregate

=== Round of 16 ===
The draw for the Round of 16 was held on December 18. This round was played between 6 and 21 January 2016.

Team 1	Agg.	Team 2	1st leg	2nd leg
Pontevedra (3) (Galicia (Spain))	3–3 (a)	(Galicia (Spain)) Rápido de Bouzas (4)	2–3	1–0
Mérida (3) (Extremadura)	8–2	(Extremadura) Badajoz (4)	6–0	2–2
SD Logroñés (4) (La Rioja)	3–5	(Cantabria) Gimnástica Torrelavega (4)	3–1	0–4
Condal (4) (Asturias)	2–4	(Aragon) Sariñena (4)	0–2	2–2
At. Baleares (3) (Balearic Islands)	7–1	(Region of Murcia) Lorca (4)	4–0	3–1
Quintanar del Rey (4) (Castilla–La Mancha)	1–2	(Valencian Community) Elche Ilicitano (4)	1–0	0–2
Móstoles (4) (Community of Madrid)	3–2	(Canary Islands) Villa Santa Brígida (4)	1–2	2–0
Guadalajara (3) (Castilla–La Mancha)	1–3	(Community of Madrid) Rayo Majadahonda (3)	1–2	0–1

==== First leg ====
6 January 2016
17:00

Pontevedra	2–3	Rápido de Bouzas
Pedro García 27'; Borjas 83'	Report	Carlos Pereira 45' (pen.) 80'; Iago Paz 51'

Pasarón, Pontevedra
Attendance: 1.000
6 January 2016
20:00

Mérida	6–0	Badajoz
Pedro Conde 1' 32' 36'; Joaqui Flores 13' 23'; Perera 89'	Report

Estadio Romano, Mérida, Badajoz
7 January 2016
20:30

SD Logroñés	3–1	Gimnástica Torrelavega
Nano 40'; Dani Suárez 73' 88'	Report	Borja Camus 90+2'

Las Gaunas, Logroño, La Rioja
Attendance: 550
6 January 2016
12:00

Condal	0–2	Sariñena
	Report	Cano 20'; Fa 79'

Alejandro Ortea, Noreña, Asturias
Attendance: 200
7 January 2016
20:00

At. Baleares	4–0	Lorca
Juan Vich 53'; Esteban 80'; Fullana 82'; Rodri 86'	Report

Son Malferit, Palma, Majorca
Attendance: 400
6 January 2016
17:00

Quintanar del Rey	1–0	Elche Ilicitano
Pablo García 25' (pen.)	Report

San Marcos, Quintanar del Rey, Cuenca
7 January 2016
20:00

Móstoles	1–2	Villa Santa Brígida
Aitor 11'	Report	Arocha 59'; Pablo Álvarez 90'

El Soto, Móstoles, Madrid
Attendance: 150
7 January 2016
16:00

Guadalajara	1–2	Rayo Majadahonda
Marqués 29' (pen.); Dani Ponce (penalty missed) 65'	Report	Rubén Blanco 12'; Raúl 79'

Pedro Escartín, Guadalajara
Attendance: 150

==== Second leg ====
20 January 2016
21:00

Rápido de Bouzas	0–1	Pontevedra
	Report	Miki 61'

Baltasar Pujales, Bouzas, Vigo, Pontevedra

Rápido de Bouzas won 3–3 on aggregate on away goals rule

20 January 2016
20:30

Badajoz	2–2	Mérida
Carreño 36'; Cano 66'	Report	Aitor 3'; Cano 8'

Nuevo Vivero, Badajoz

Mérida won 8–2 on aggregate

20 January 2016
20:00

Gimnástica Torrelavega	4–0	SD Logroñés
Siro 14'; Escudero (o.g.) 20'; Primo 24'; Jony 53'	Report

El Malecón, Torrelavega, Cantabria

Gimnástica Torrelavega won 5–3 on aggregate

20 January 2016
19:00

Sariñena	2–2	Condal
Ibra 26'; Cano 36'	Report	Fassani 1' (pen.); Abraham 45'

El Carmen, Sariñena, Huesca

Sariñena won 4–2 on aggregate

21 January 2016
20:45

Lorca	1–3	At. Baleares
Homar 46' (pen.)	Report	Chando 20'; Bruno 41'; Xisco 63'

Francisco Artés Carrasco, Lorca, Murcia

At. Baleares won 7–1 on aggregate

20 January 2016
16:30

Elche Ilicitano	2–0	Quintanar del Rey
Fran Martínez 62'; Deivid 81' (pen.)	Report

Díez Iborra, Elche, Alicante

Elche Ilicitano won 2–1 on aggregate

21 January 2016
20:30

Villa Santa Brígida	0–2	Móstoles
	Report	Fratelli 28'; Aitor Lora 90+5'

Municipal Juan Guedes, Las Palmas, Gran Canaria
Attendance: 500

Móstoles won 3–2 on aggregate

20 January 2016
20:00

Rayo Majadahonda	1–0	Guadalajara
Quique Vázquez 75' (pen.)	Report

Cerro del Espino, Majadahonda, Madrid
Attendance: 150

Rayo Majadahonda won 3–1 on aggregate

=== Quarter-finals ===
The draw was held 22 January. Quarter-finals round was played between 3 and 10 February 2016.

Team 1	Agg.	Team 2	1st leg	2nd leg
Rayo Majadahonda (3) (Community of Madrid)	4–1	(Community of Madrid) Móstoles (4)	0–1	4–0
Mérida (3) (Extremadura)	4–1	(Galicia (Spain)) Rápido de Bouzas (4)	3–0	1–1
At. Baleares (3) (Balearic Islands)	3–3 (a)	(Valencian Community) Elche Ilicitano (4)	1–0	2–3
Sariñena (4) (Aragon)	2–4	(Cantabria) Gimnástica Torrelavega (4)	1–1	1–3

==== First leg ====
4 February 2016
20:30

Rayo Majadahonda	0–1	Móstoles
	Report	Moha 70'

Cerro del Espino, Majadahonda, Madrid
Attendance: 250
3 February 2016
20:30

Mérida	3–0	Rápido de Bouzas
Pablo Vivanco 30'; Borja 49'; Aitor García 88'	Report

Estadio Romano, Mérida, Badajoz
Attendance: 1040
3 February 2016
20:00

At. Baleares	1–0	Elche Ilicitano
Rodri 32'	Report

Son Malferit, Palma, Majorca
Attendance: 270
3 February 2016
19:00

Sariñena	1–1	Gimnástica Torrelavega
Lucho 64'	Report	Cano 77'

El Carmen, Sariñena, Huesca
Attendance: 450

==== Second leg ====
10 February 2016
20:15

Móstoles	0–4	Rayo Majadahonda
	Report	De Pedro 1'; Quique Vázquez 37'; Borja Acha 51' 89'

El Soto, Móstoles, Madrid
Attendance: 250

Rayo Majadahonda won 4–1 on aggregate

10 February 2016
21:00

Rápido de Bouzas	1–1	Mérida
Gustavo Souto 61'	Report	Aitor 87'

Baltasar Pujales, Bouzas, Vigo, Pontevedra

Mérida won 4–1 on aggregate

10 February 2016
15:30

Elche Ilicitano	3–2	At. Baleares
Primi 30'; Rubio 37'; Sory Kaba 50'	Report	Kristian 72'; Jurado 75'

Díez Iborra, Elche, Alicante
Attendance: 500

At. Baleares won 3–3 on aggregate on away goals rule

10 February 2016
20:00

Gimnástica Torrelavega	3–1	Sariñena
Vitienes 57'; Jordi Vidal 64'; Mario 73'	Report	Lucho 3'

El Malecón, Torrelavega, Cantabria

Gimnástica won 4–2 on aggregate

=== Semi-finals ===
The draw was held 12 February. Semi-finals were played between 3 and 16 March 2016.

Team 1	Agg.	Team 2	1st leg	2nd leg
Mérida (3) (Extremadura)	1–4	(Community of Madrid) Rayo Majadahonda (3)	0–4	1–0
At. Baleares (3) (Balearic Islands)	3–2	(Cantabria) Gimnástica Torrelavega (4)	1–0	2–2

==== First leg ====
3 March 2016
20:30

Mérida	0–4	Rayo Majadahonda
	Report	Sergi 1'; Jorge Félix 72'; Joao Pedro 80' 87'

Estadio Romano, Mérida, Badajoz
Attendance: 1.317
3 March 2016
20:00

At. Baleares	1–0	Gimnástica Torrelavega
Prieto 42'	Report

Son Malferit, Palma, Majorca
Attendance: 350

==== Second leg ====
16 March 2016
20:30

Rayo Majadahonda	0–1	Mérida
	Report	Zamora 68'

Cerro del Espino, Majadahonda, Madrid
Attendance: 200

Rayo Majadahonda won 4–1 on aggregate

16 March 2016
20:00

Gimnástica Torrelavega	2–2	At. Baleares
Hugo Vitienes 31'; Siro 66'	Report	Chando 26'; Casares 75'

El Malecón, Torrelavega, Cantabria

At. Baleares won 3–2 on aggregate

=== Final ===
Final was played between 6 and 13 April 2016.

Team 1	Agg.	Team 2	1st leg	2nd leg
Rayo Majadahonda (3) (Community of Madrid)	2–3	(Balearic Islands) At. Baleares (3)	2–2	0–1

==== First leg ====
6 April 2016
18:00

Rayo Majadahonda	2–2	At. Baleares
Portilla 13'; Rubén Blanco 22'	Report	Javi Casares 7'; Rubén Jurado 48'

Cerro del Espino, Majadahonda, Madrid
Attendance: 800

==== Second leg ====
13 April 2016
18:00

At. Baleares	1–0	Rayo Majadahonda
Rubén Jurado 29'	Report

Son Malferit, Palma, Majorca
Attendance: 1.300

At. Baleares won 3–2 on aggregate
