= 2019 Copa Federación de España =

Tournament details
- Country: Spain
- Teams: 32 (in national phase)

Final positions
- Champions: Murcia (1st title)
- Runners-up: Tudelano

The 2019 Copa Federación de España is the 27th edition of the Copa Federación de España, also known as Copa RFEF, a knockout competition for Spanish football clubs in Segunda División B and Tercera División.

The competition began in late July with the first games of the Regional stages and will end in November 2019 with the national final. As part of the new competition format, the four semifinalists will join the 2019–20 Copa del Rey first round.

== Regional tournaments ==
=== West Andalusia and Ceuta tournament ===
Utrera was the only registered team and qualified directly for national phase.

=== East Andalusia and Melilla tournament ===
Vélez was the only registered team and qualified directly for national phase.

=== Aragon tournament ===
Eight teams joined the tournament in the 2019–20 edition.

==== Group 1 ====
Pos	Team	Pld	W	D	L	GF	GA	GD	Pts	Qualification	MON	SJU	SAR	ALM
1	Atlético Monzón	3	1	2	0	7	6	+1	5	Qualification to the final	—	2–2	—	4–3
2	San Juan	3	1	2	0	4	3	+1	5		—	—	—	1–1
3	Sariñena	3	1	1	1	4	3	+1	4		1–1	0–1	—	—
4	Almudévar	3	0	1	2	5	8	−3	1		—	—	1–3	—

Source: Federación Aragonesa de Fútbol

==== Group 2 ====
Pos	Team	Pld	W	D	L	GF	GA	GD	Pts	Qualification	TER	BRE	BOR	UTE
1	Teruel	3	2	1	0	4	1	+3	7	Qualification to the final	—	2–1	0–0	—
2	Brea	3	2	0	1	6	2	+4	6		—	—	—	3–0
3	Borja	3	1	1	1	1	2	−1	4		—	0–2	—	—
4	Utebo	3	0	0	3	0	6	−6	0		0–2	—	0–1	—

Source: Federación Aragonesa de Fútbol

==== Final ====
28 August	Teruel	3–1	Atlético Monzón	Teruel
20:00	Fran Pérez 9'; Romero 38'; Hernáiz 90'	Report	Chema 47'	Stadium: Pinilla

=== Asturias tournament ===
For this edition, reserve teams were excluded. This decision affected to Sporting Gijón B, Oviedo B and Praviano, that since this season acted as Oviedo's second reserve team.

Groups were drawn on 23 July in a competition where format changed as all the knockout stage will be played at Estadio Santa Cruz, in Gijón.

Pot 1	Pot 2	Pot 3
Caudal; Covadonga; Llanera; Llanes	Tuilla; L'Entregu; Mosconia; Condal	Colunga; Ceares; Avilés; San Martín

==== Group stage ====
===== Group A =====
Pos	Team	Pld	W	D	L	GF	GA	GD	Pts	Qualification	LLA	MOS	AVI
1	Llanes	4	3	0	1	8	5	+3	9	Qualification to semifinals	—	2–3	1–0
2	Mosconia	4	2	1	1	7	6	+1	7		1–3	—	1–1
3	Avilés	4	0	1	3	2	6	−4	1		1–2	0–2	—

Source: Fútbol Asturiano

===== Group B =====
Pos	Team	Pld	W	D	L	GF	GA	GD	Pts	Qualification	LLA	COL	ENT
1	Llanera	4	4	0	0	10	1	+9	12	Qualification to semifinals	—	4–1	2–0
2	Colunga	4	2	0	2	6	8	−2	6		0–2	—	3–1
3	L'Entregu	4	0	0	4	2	9	−7	0		0–2	1–2	—

Source: Fútbol Asturiano

===== Group C =====
Pos	Team	Pld	W	D	L	GF	GA	GD	Pts	Qualification	CAU	CON	SMA
1	Caudal	4	2	1	1	2	2	0	7	Qualification to semifinals	—	0–2	1–0
2	Condal	4	1	2	1	5	5	0	5		0–0	—	2–2
3	San Martín	4	1	1	2	5	5	0	4		0–1	3–1	—

Source: Fútbol Asturiano

===== Group D =====
Pos	Team	Pld	W	D	L	GF	GA	GD	Pts	Qualification	TUI	COV	CEA
1	Tuilla	4	2	0	2	5	4	+1	6	Qualification to semifinals	—	3–2	2–0
2	Covadonga	4	1	2	1	4	4	0	5		1–0	—	1–1
3	Ceares	4	1	2	1	2	3	−1	5		1–0	0–0	—

Source: Fútbol Asturiano

==== Knockout stage ====
Semi-finals
3 September – Gijón
Llanes	2
Llanera	0
4 September – Gijón
Caudal	0
Tuilla	1

Final
11 September – Gijón
Llanes	2
Tuilla	1

==== Final ====
11 September	Llanes	2–1	Tuilla	Gijón
19:15	Ivanchu 74'; Dorronsoro 90+3'	Report	Velardi 58'	Stadium: Santa Cruz; Attendance: 800; Referee: Valdés Díaz

=== Balearic Islands tournament ===
Only Ibiza Islas Pitiusas and Poblense joined the tournament.

==== Final ====
11 September	Poblense	2–1	Ibiza Islas Pitiusas	Sa Pobla
	Pep Vidal 51'; Lucas Gilardoni 85'	Report	Alejandro Forner 90'	Stadium: Nou Camp; Referee: Carballal Vales

=== Basque Country tournament ===
Pos	Team	Pld	W	D	L	GF	GA	GD	Pts	Qualification	DUR	RUN	URD
1	Cultural Durango	2	2	0	0	4	1	+3	6	Qualified	—	2–1	—
2	Real Unión	2	1	0	1	7	2	+5	3		—	—	6–0
3	Urduliz	2	0	0	2	0	8	−8	0		0–2	—	—

Source: Federación Vasca de Fútbol
Rules for classification: 1) Points; 2) Goal difference; 3) Number of goals scored; 4) Head-to-head results.

=== Canary Islands tournament ===
Unión Viera was the only registered team and qualified directly for national phase.

=== Cantabria tournament ===
Teams qualified between second and ninth place in 2017–18 Tercera División Group 3 registered for playing the competition, except Racing Santander B as reserve team. The bracket was drawn on 4 July. Quarter-finals and Semi-finals were played in Santa Cruz de Bezana.

Quarter-finals
10 August
Gimnástica Torrelavega	3
Textil Escudo	1
10 August
Bezana	3
Sámano	1
11 August
Tropezón	3
Torina	0
11 August
Cayón (p)	1 (5)
Vimenor	1 (3)

Semi-finals
15 August
Gimnástica Torrelavega (p)	1 (4)
Bezana	1 (3)
15 August
Tropezón	2
Cayón	1

Final
27 August
Gimnástica Torrelavega	1
Tropezón (a.e.t.)	3

==== Final ====
27 August	Gimnástica Torrelavega	1–3 (a.e.t.)	Tropezón	Torrelavega
20:30	Vitienes 81'	Report	Fresno 17' 114' (pen.); Jorge 96'	Stadium: El Malecón; Attendance: 2,200; Referee: López Conde

=== Castile-La Mancha tournament ===
The Castile-La Mancha Football Federation announced the XVIII Torneo Junta de Comunidades de Castilla La Mancha as the regional Copa RFEF qualifying tournament.

Quarter-finals
3 and 10 August
Calvo Sotelo (p)	1	0	1
Manchego	0	1	1
4 and 11 August
Toledo	4	1	5
Villarrobledo	0	2	2
4 and 10 August
La Roda	1	0	1
At. Albacete	0	0	0
4 and 10 August
Quintanar del Rey	0	0	0
Conquense	0	1	1

Semi-finals
15 and 18 August
Calvo Sotelo	2	0	2
Toledo	1	2	3
15 and 18 August
La Roda	1	0	1
Conquense	2	5	7

Final
12 September
Toledo	1
Conquense	2

==== Final ====
12 September	Toledo	1–2	Conquense	Tarancón
20:00	Álex Jiménez 9'	Report	Diego Manzano 33' (pen.); Basilio Jordán 59'	Stadium: Municipal; Referee: Pablo Pardos Matamoros

=== Castile and León tournament ===
Only Arandina and Real Burgos joined the tournament.

==== Final ====
28 August	Real Burgos	0–1	Arandina	Burgos
19:15		Report	Joaqui 80'	Stadium: San Amaro

4 September	Arandina	3–0 (4–0 agg.)	Real Burgos	Aranda de Duero
20:00	Beli 18'; Adeva 65'; Diego Abad 77'	Report		Stadium: El Montecillo

=== Catalonia tournament ===
Only Prat and Vilafranca joined the tournament.

==== Final ====
18 September	Prat	2–1	Vilafranca	El Prat de Llobregat
19:30	Raillo 2', 56'	Report	Oribe 73'	Stadium: Sagnier

=== Extremadura tournament ===
17 teams joined the tournament, consisting in a single-game knockout tournament. The preliminary round and the round of 16 were firstly drawn, and later each round was drawn independently.

Preliminary round
27 July
Olivenza (p)	1
Jerez	1

Round of 16
4 August
Miajadas (p)	1 (4)
Valdivia	1 (3)
4 August
Plasencia	0
Moralo	3
4 August
Trujillo (p)	2 (4)
Diocesano	2 (2)
4 August
Aceuchal	2
Extremadura B	0
3 August
Racing Valverdeño (p)	2 (4)
Olivenza	2 (2)
4 August
Fuente de Cantos	1
Llerenense	3
3 August
Arroyo	1
Cacereño	0
4 August
Montijo	0
Calamonte	1

Quarter-finals
14 August
Miajadas (p)	0 (5)
Moralo	0 (4)
11 August
Trujillo (p)	0 (7)
Aceuchal	0 (6)
11 August
Racing Valverdeño	3
Llerenense	0
11 August
Arroyo (p)	1 (7)
Calamonte	1 (6)

Semi-finals
18 August
Miajadas	0
Trujillo	2
18 August
Racing Valverdeño	0
Arroyo	1

Final
4 September - Villafranca de los Barros
Trujillo	1
Arroyo	2

==== Final ====
4 September	Trujillo	1–2	Arroyo	Villafranca de los Barros
21:00	Nombela 56'	Report	Bella 25'; Javi Martín 44'	Stadium: Municipal; Attendance: 400; Referee: Olivera Vázquez

=== Galicia tournament ===
For this edition, reserve teams were excluded and the winner will receive a price of €3,005.

Preliminary round
24 July
Silva	1
Paiosaco	2

Quarter-finals
28 July
Paiosaco (w.o.)
Rápido de Bouzas
9 August
Estradense	2 (2)
Compostela (p)	2 (3)
8 August
Arenteiro	1 (0)
Ourense CF (p)	1 (2)
6 August
Alondras (w.o.)
Coruxo

Semi-finals
18 August
Paiosaco	1 (2)
Compostela (p)	1 (4)
18 August
Ourense CF (w.o.)
Alondras

Final
4 September - Sanxenxo
Compostela (p)	3 (7)
Ourense CF	3 (6)

==== Final ====
4 September	Compostela	3–3 (a.e.t.) (7–6 p)	Ourense CF	Portonovo, Sanxenxo
20:00	Miki 20'; Rodri Alonso 31'; Germán Novoa (o.g.) 95'	Report	Renan Zanelli 59' (pen.); Adri Castro 72', 113'	Stadium: Baltar; Attendance: 500; Referee: García Nesta

=== La Rioja tournament ===
Six teams joined the tournament.

Quarter-finals
12 August
Pradejón	2
Arnedo	4
11 August
UD Logroñés Promesas	0
Varea	1

Semi-finals
18 August
Arnedo	1
Anguiano	2
18 August
Varea	1 (1)
Náxara (p)	1 (3)

Final
11 September - Logroño
Anguiano	1
Náxara	2

==== Final ====
11 September	Anguiano	1–2	Náxara	Logroño
20:30	Fede Krumnack 60'	Report	Eloy Blanco 19'; Sergio Fernández Tamayo 44'	Stadium: Mundial 82; Referee: Khalid Glibi

=== Madrid tournament ===
Only Móstoles URJC and Navalcarnero joined the tournament.

==== Final ====
5 September	Móstoles URJC	2–0	Navalcarnero	Madrid
20:00	Portilla 31'; Álex González 43'	Report		Stadium: García de la Mata; Attendance: 150; Referee: Nicolae Giurca

=== Murcia tournament ===
6 teams joined the tournament. Two groups of three teams were established at two different locations, in the Gómez Meseguer field in Cartagena and in the Los Garres field in Murcia. Each match will last 45 minutes. The champions of each group qualifies to the final.

==== Group 1 ====
Pos	Team	Pld	W	D	L	GF	GA	GD	Pts	Qualification	MAR	CAR	LOR
1	Mar Menor	2	1	0	1	2	2	0	3	Qualification to the Final	—	2–1	—
2	Cartagena FC	2	1	0	1	2	2	0	3		—	—	1–0
3	Lorca FC	2	1	0	1	1	1	0	3		1–0	—	—

Source: Federación de Fútbol de la Región de Murcia
Rules for classification: 1) Points; 2) Goal difference; 3) Number of goals scored; 4) Head-to-head results.

==== Group 2 ====
Pos	Team	Pld	W	D	L	GF	GA	GD	Pts	Qualification	MUL	PLU	GAR
1	Muleño	2	1	1	0	3	1	+2	4	Qualification to the Final	—	—	3–1
2	Plus Ultra	2	1	1	0	1	0	+1	4		0–0	—	—
3	Los Garres	2	0	0	2	1	4	−3	0		—	0–1	—

Source: Federación de Fútbol de la Región de Murcia
Rules for classification: 1) Points; 2) Goal difference; 3) Number of goals scored; 4) Head-to-head results.

==== Final ====
28 August	Mar Menor	0–2	Muleño	Alhama de Murcia
21:00		Report	Pedro Ángel 2', 80'	Stadium: Bajo Guadalentín

=== Navarre tournament ===
Only Cortes and Huarte joined the tournament.

==== Final ====
4 September	Cortes	1–0	Huarte	Olite
19:00	Embid 60'			Stadium: San Miguel

=== Valencian Community tournament ===
6 teams joined the tournament. Tournament will be played in three stages, the first with two groups of three teams, second with the semifinals being the group winners the local team and third the final in a neutral venue.

==== Group 1 ====
Pos	Team	Pld	W	D	L	GF	GA	GD	Pts	Qualification	ROD	SAG	ALZ
1	Roda	2	1	1	0	5	4	+1	4	Qualification to the semifinal	—	1–1	—
2	Atlético Saguntino	2	1	1	0	2	1	+1	4	Qualification to the semifinal	—	—	1–0
3	Alzira	2	0	0	2	3	5	−2	0		3–4	—	—

Source: Federación de Fútbol de la Comunitat Valenciana
Rules for classification: 1) Points; 2) Goal difference; 3) Number of goals scored; 4) Head-to-head results.

==== Group 2 ====
Pos	Team	Pld	W	D	L	GF	GA	GD	Pts	Qualification	JOV	NOV	OLI
1	Jove Español	2	2	0	0	5	1	+4	6	Qualification to the semifinal	—	2–1	—
2	Novelda	2	1	0	1	4	2	+2	3	Qualification to the semifinal	—	—	3–0*
3	Olímpic	2	0	0	2	0	6	−6	0		0–3*	—	—

Source: Federación de Fútbol de la Comunitat Valenciana
Rules for classification: 1) Points; 2) Goal difference; 3) Number of goals scored; 4) Head-to-head results.
- Olímpic fielded ineligible players and was sanctioned by FFCV, which resulted in the awarding of 3–0 wins for Jove Español and Novelda. Olímpic had won 2–1 the two matches.

==== Knockout stage ====
Semi-finals
28 August
Roda	3
Novelda	0
28 August
Jove Español	1
Atlético Saguntino	0

Final
18 September – Ontinyent
Roda	1
Jove Español	3

==== Final ====
18 September	Roda	1–3	Jove Español	Ontinyent
19:30	Adrián Eixea 65'	Report	Fede Romero 3'; Jorge 7'; Cobo 82'	Stadium: El Clariano; Referee: Jonatan González

== National phase ==
National phase was played between October and December with 32 teams (18 winners of the Regional Tournaments and 14 teams of Segunda División B). The four semifinalists qualified to 2019–20 Copa del Rey first round.

=== Qualified teams ===
Best 14 qualified non-reserve teams from 2018–19 Segunda División B not qualified to 2019–20 Copa del Rey

- (Valencian Community) Alcoyano (4)
- (Castile and León) Burgos (3)
- (La Rioja) Calahorra (3)
- (Valencian Community) Castellón (3)
- (Galicia (Spain)) Coruxo (3)
- (Community of Madrid) Internacional (3)
- (Navarre) Izarra (3)
- (Andalusia) Linense (3)
- (Region of Murcia) Murcia (3)
- (Catalonia) Sabadell (3)
- (Castile and León) Salamanca UDS (3)
- (Andalusia) San Fernando (3)
- (Castilla–La Mancha) Talavera de la Reina (3)
- (Navarre) Tudelano (3)

Winners of Autonomous Communities tournaments

- (Castile and León) Arandina (4)
- (Extremadura) Arroyo (4)
- (Galicia (Spain)) Compostela (4)
- (Castilla–La Mancha) Conquense (4)
- (Navarre) Cortes (4)
- (Basque Country (autonomous community)) Cultural Durango (4)
- (Valencian Community) Jove Español (4)
- (Asturias) Llanes (4)
- (Community of Madrid) Móstoles URJC (4)
- (Region of Murcia) Muleño (4)
- (La Rioja) Náxara (4)
- (Balearic Islands) Poblense (4)
- (Catalonia) Prat (3)
- (Aragon) Teruel (4)
- (Cantabria) Tropezón (4)
- (Canary Islands) Unión Viera (4)
- (Andalusia) Utrera (4)
- (Andalusia) Vélez (4)

- (3) Team playing in 2019–20 Segunda División B (third tier)
- (4) Team playing in 2019–20 Tercera División (fourth tier)

=== Draw ===
The draw of all the tournament was held at the headquarters of the RFEF on 20 September. Teams were divided in four pots according to geographical criteria. Each pot will play independently until semifinals:

Pot A	Pot B	Pot C	Pot D
(Canary Islands) Unión Viera (Castile and León) Arandina (Castile and León) Burgos (Castile and León) Salamanca UDS (Galicia (Spain)) Compostela (Galicia (Spain)) Coruxo (Community of Madrid) Internacional (Community of Madrid) Móstoles URJC	(Asturias) Llanes (Basque Country (autonomous community)) Cultural Durango (Cantabria) Tropezón (La Rioja) Calahorra (La Rioja) Náxara (Navarre) Cortes (Navarre) Izarra (Navarre) Tudelano	(Aragon) Teruel (Balearic Islands) Poblense (Catalonia) Sabadell (Catalonia) Prat (Region of Murcia) Muleño (Valencian Community) Alcoyano (Valencian Community) Castellón (Valencian Community) Jove Español	(Andalusia) Linense (Andalusia) San Fernando (Andalusia) Utrera (Andalusia) Vélez (Castilla–La Mancha) Conquense (Castilla–La Mancha) Talavera de la Reina (Extremadura) Arroyo (Region of Murcia) Murcia

=== Round of 32 ===
2 October	Poblense (4)	2–1	Teruel (4)	Sa Pobla
18:30	Damià Ramos 54'; Mateo Ferrer 80'	Report	Adán Pérez 13'	Stadium: Nou Camp; Referee: Brian Díaz

2 October	Prat (3)	2–1 (a.e.t.)	Muleño (4)	El Prat de Llobregat
19:30	Moha Chabboura 30'; Javi Morales 107'	Report	Belando 61'	Stadium: Sagnier

2 October	Cultural Durango (4)	2–0	Tropezón (4)	Durango
20:00	Unzueta (penalty missed) 15' 71'; Ander Franco 90+1'	Report		Stadium: Tabira; Referee: Fernández Santesteban

3 October	Tudelano (3)	5–0	Cortes (4)	Tudela
16:30	Iñaki Jiménez 12'; Edson Torres 42'; Adrián Socorro 74'; David Soto 84'; Diego Suárez 87'	Report		Stadium: Ciudad de Tudela

3 October	Coruxo (3)	1–0	Internacional (3)	Coruxo, Vigo
17:30	Sylla 77'	Report		Stadium: O Vao

3 October	Móstoles URJC (4)	2–0	Unión Viera (4)	Móstoles
19:00	More 67', 86'	Report		Stadium: El Soto; Referee: Lorenzo Torres

3 October	Salamanca UDS (3)	1–0	Burgos (3)	Villares de la Reina
19:30	Gio 61'	Report		Stadium: Helmántico; Referee: García Padilla

3 October	Izarra (3)	2–1	Llanes (4)	Estella
19:30	Ardanaz 48'; Mikel Yoldi 59'	Report	Pablo Prieto 8'	Stadium: Merkatondoa; Attendance: 250; Referee: Franco Llorente

3 October	Compostela (4)	4–1	Arandina (4)	Santiago de Compostela
20:00	Miki 1'; Rodri Alonso 51'; Josiño 77'; Hugo Sanmartín 81'	Report	Pesca 60'	Stadium: Vero Boquete; Attendance: 350; Referee: González Suárez

3 October	Náxara (4)	0–1	Calahorra (3)	Nájera
20:30		Report	Carralero 86'	Stadium: La Salera; Referee: Hernández Andrés

3 October	Vélez (4)	0–2	Murcia (3)	Vélez-Málaga
20:30		Report	Álex Melgar 58'; Toril 68'	Stadium: Vivar Téllez; Referee: Mora Correas

3 October	San Fernando (3)	4–0	Arroyo (4)	San Fernando
20:30	David Toro 12', 51', 78'; Gabi Ramos 16'	Report		Stadium: Iberoamericano; Attendance: 800; Referee: Pardos Matamoros

3 October	Linense (3)	4–0	Conquense (4)	La Línea de la Concepción
20:30	Albisua 4', 45'; Manu Molina 61'; Dopi 87'	Report		Stadium: Municipal; Attendance: 707; Referee: Carretero González

3 October	Talavera de la Reina (3)	2–0	Utrera (4)	Talavera de la Reina
20:45	Samu Corral 67', 90+2'	Report		Stadium: El Prado; Referee: González Oliva

9 October	Jove Español (4)	0–0 (a.e.t.) (4–1 p)	Sabadell (3)	San Vicente del Raspeig
12:00		Report		Stadium: Ciudad Deportiva; Attendance: 1,018

9 October	Alcoyano (4)	Awarded	Castellón (3)	Alcoy
18:00		Report		Stadium: El Collao; Referee: Clemente Ortuño

=== Round of 16 ===
16 October	Tudelano (3)	1–0	Calahorra (3)	Tudela
16:30	Miguel Díaz 79' (pen.)	Report		Stadium: Ciudad de Tudela; Referee: Suberbiola Zúñiga

16 October	Poblense (4)	1–1 (a.e.t.) (3–5 p)	Prat (3)	Sa Pobla
18:00	Mateu Ferrer 90+3' (pen.)	Report	Jordi Oribe 40'	Stadium: Nou Camp; Referee: González Peris

16 October	Cultural Durango (4)	1–4	Izarra (3)	Durango
19:30	Ibon 40'	Report	Laborda 19'; Toni 39'; Yoldi 84'; Hinojosa 88'	Stadium: Tabira; Referee: González Crespo

16 October	Salamanca UDS (3)	3–2	Móstoles URJC (4)	Villares de la Reina
20:00	Ubis 21'; Hugo Díaz 51', 83'	Report	Portilla 9'; Chupe 52'	Stadium: Helmántico; Attendance: 4,000; Referee: Manuel Casanovas

16 October	Compostela (4)	1–2 (a.e.t.)	Coruxo (3)	Santiago de Compostela
20:30	Gabri Palmás 82'	Report	Antón de Vicente 74'; Sylla 99'	Stadium: Vero Boquete; Attendance: 500; Referee: Diego Valdés

16 October	Murcia (3)	1–0	Talavera de la Reina (3)	Murcia
21:00	Andy Escudero 29'	Report		Stadium: Nueva Condomina; Attendance: 6,000; Referee: Manrique Antequera

17 October	Castellón (3)	2–0	Jove Español (4)	Castellón de la Plana
20:00	Rafa Gálvez 60', 90+2'	Report		Stadium: Nou Castàlia; Attendance: 4,000; Referee: Serrat Susi

17 October	San Fernando (3)	0–1	Linense (3)	San Fernando
20:30		Report	Dopi 22'	Stadium: Iberoamericano; Attendance: 500; Referee: Bote González

=== Quarter-finals ===
Winners will qualify to 2019–20 Copa del Rey first round.

6 November	Salamanca UDS (3)	2–2 (a.e.t.) (2–3 p)	Coruxo (3)	Villares de la Reina
20:00	Amaro 35'; Ángel Sánchez 103'	Report	Antón de Vicente 34'; Mateo 95'	Stadium: Helmántico; Referee: Morona del Campo

6 November	Castellón (3)	0–0 (a.e.t.) (5–3 p)	Prat (3)	Castellón de la Plana
20:00		Report		Stadium: Nou Castàlia; Referee: Ivaylov Angelov

7 November	Izarra (3)	1–5	Tudelano (3)	Estella-Lizarra
19:30	Encada 48'	Report	Diego Suárez 34' 39' (pen.); Obieta 56', 74'; Soto 64'	Stadium: Merkatondoa; Referee: Ruiz Rabanal

7 November	Murcia (3)	2–1	Linense (3)	Murcia
21:00	Juanra 2'; Chumbi 69'	Report	Tomás 63'	Stadium: Nueva Condomina; Attendance: 4,201; Referee: Javier García

=== Semi-finals ===
20 November	Tudelano (3)	1–0	Coruxo (3)	Tudela
12:00	Iñaki Jiménez 12'	Report		Stadium: Ciudad de Tudela; Referee: Francisco Crespo

20 November	Castellón (3)	0–3 (a.e.t.)	Murcia (3)	Castellón de la Plana
20:00		Report	Silvente 93'; Pedrosa 106'; Peque 116'	Stadium: Nou Castàlia; Referee: David Ferrer Collado

=== Final ===
5 December
20:00

Murcia (3)	1–1 (a.e.t.)	Tudelano (3)
Toril 61'	Report	Diego Suárez 6'
Penalties
	4–2

Enrique Roca, Murcia
Attendance: 6,074
Referee: Morena Llorens
