= Copa Federación de España (Navarre tournament) =

The Navarre tournament is the previous round of the Copa RFEF in Navarre. Organized by the Navarrese Football Federation, the Navarrese teams in Segunda División B and the best teams of the Tercera División (Group 3) not qualified to the Copa del Rey play this tournament, including farm teams.

It is usually played between July and October, and the champion of the tournament qualifies to the National tournament of the Copa RFEF.

== Format ==
The Cup has been played since 2005, when the Navarrese group split from La Rioja. Played by the teams that did not qualify to Copa del Rey, the format depends on the number of registered teams.

The winner receives a €3,000 prize.

== History ==
Year	Winner	Runner-up	1st leg	2nd leg	Score
2004	Izarra	Oberena	3–1	1–2	5–3
2005	Burladés	Iruña	2–1	0–1	3–1
2006	Ardoi	Valle de Egüés	3–1		
2007	Oberena	Ardoi	2–1		
2008	Ardoi	Valle de Egüés	2–0		
2009	Oberena	Valle de Egüés	League system		
2010	Izarra	Oberena	1–1	0–1	2–1
2011	Peña Sport	Azkoyen	2–2	4–0	6–2
2012	Valtierrano	Valle de Egüés	1–1	2–2	3–3 (a)
2013	Peña Sport	Iruña	1–0		
2014	Osasuna B	Huarte	2–2 (3–0 p)		
2015	Valle de Egüés	Mutilvera	4–3 (a.e.t.)		
2016	Peña Sport	Iruña	1–0		
2017	Ardoi	Tudelano	1–0		
2018	Peña Sport	Atlético Cirbonero	League system		
2019	Cortes	Huarte	1–0		

== Champions ==
Teams	Winners	Runners-up	Winning years
Peña Sport	4	0	2011, 2013, 2016, 2018
Ardoi	3	1	2006, 2008, 2017
Oberena	2	2	2007, 2009
Izarra	2	0	2004, 2010
Valle de Egüés	1	4	2015
Burladés	1	0	2005
Valtierrano	1	0	2012
Osasuna B	1	0	2014
Cortes	1	0	2019
Iruña	0	3	
Huarte	0	2	
Azkoyen	0	1	
Tudelano	0	1	
Multivera	0	1	
Atlético Cirbonero	0	1	
