= Yefri =

Yefri or Yefry is a given name. Notable people with the given name include:

- Yefri Pérez (born 1991), Dominican baseball outfielder
- Yefri Reyes, multiple people
- Yefry Ramírez (born 1993), Dominican baseball pitcher
