= Yefri Reyes =

Yefri Reyes may refer to:

- Yefri Reyes (footballer, born 1995), Dominican defender
- Yefri Reyes (footballer, born 1996), Venezuelan midfielder
