= Manuel Borrego (politician) =

Spanish politician (born 1980)

Member of the Senate
- Incumbent
- Assumed office 17 February 2026
- Appointed by: Assembly of Extremadura

Personal details
- Born: 15 October 1980 (age 45)
- Party: Spanish Socialist Workers' Party

Manuel Borrego Rodríguez (born 15 October 1980) is a Spanish politician serving as a member of the Senate since 2026. He has served as mayor of Valverde de Leganés since 2019.
