= Diego Diz =

Spanish footballer

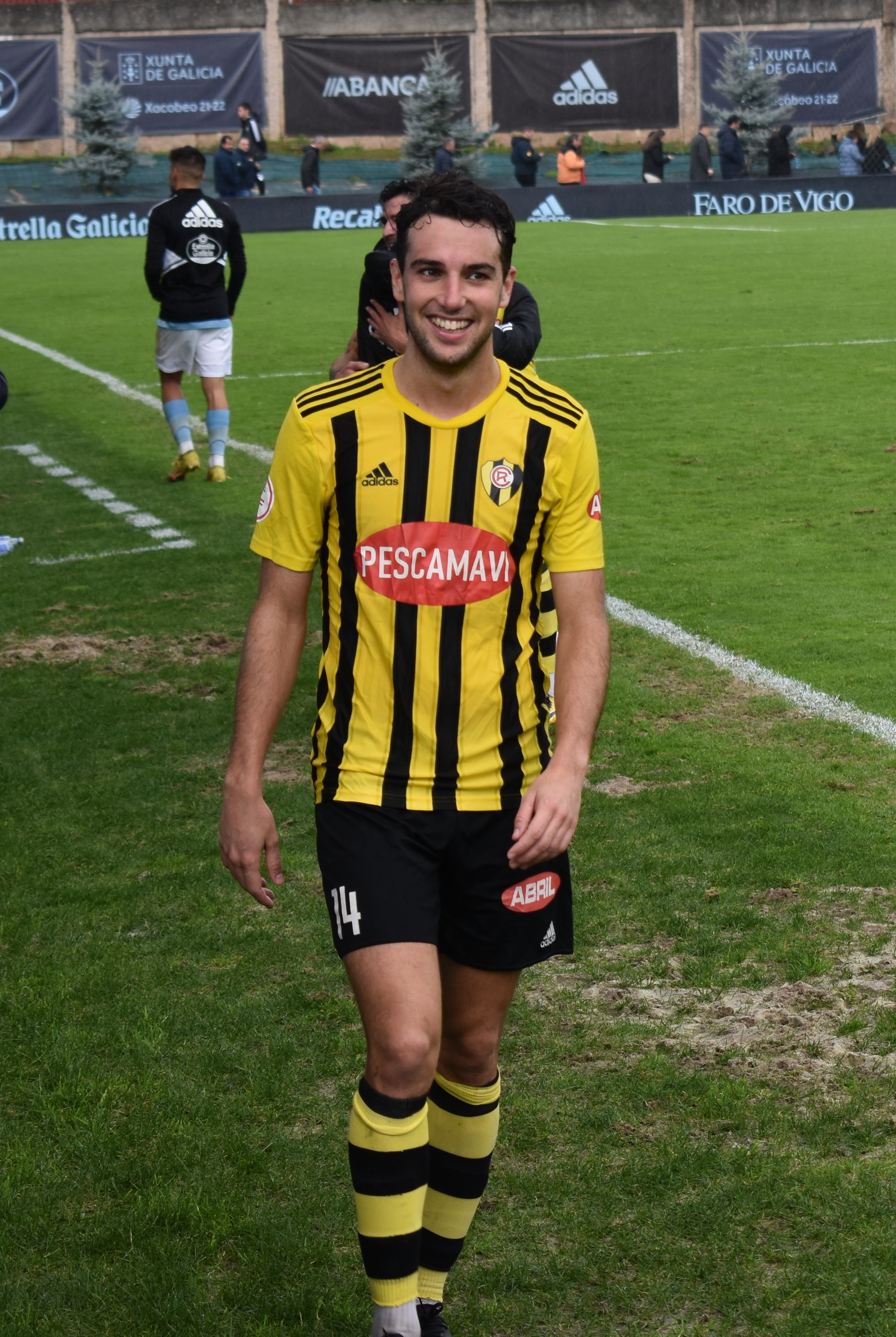

Personal information
- Full name: Diego Diz Martínez
- Date of birth: 12 November 1991 (age 34)
- Place of birth: Vigo, Spain
- Height: 1.83 m (6 ft 0 in)
- Position: Midfielder

Team information
- Current team: Cultural Areas

Youth career
- Rápido de Bouzas

Senior career*
| Years | Team | Apps | (Gls) |
| –2015 | Rápido de Bouzas | 106+ | (18+) |
| 2015–2016 | Alondras | 27 | (2) |
| 2016–2019 | Rápido de Bouzas | 104 | (14) |
| 2019 | Grindavík | 11 | (0) |
| 2020 | Samtredia | 15 | (2) |
| 2021 | AC Oulu | 0 | (0) |
| 2021 | OLS | 2 | (0) |
| 2021–2022 | Arosa | 31 | (0) |
| 2022–2024 | Rápido de Bouzas | 62 | (6) |
| 2024–2025 | Alondras | 19 | (1) |
| 2025– | Cultural Areas | 5 | (1) |
- * Club domestic league appearances and goals as of 5 October 2025

Diego Diz Martínez (born 12 November 1991) is a Spanish footballer who plays as a midfielder for Preferente Futgal club Cultural Areas.

== Career ==
In 2015, Diz signed for Spanish fourth division side Alondras.

In 2019, he signed for Grindavík in Iceland from Spanish third division club Rápido de Bouzas.

Before the 2020 season, he signed for Samtredia in Georgia, claiming that the football was more technical than Iceland there.

Before the 2021 season, Diz signed for Finnish team AC Oulu.
