= CAP Ciudad de Murcia =

Association football club in Spain

Ciudad de Murcia
- Full name: Club de Accionariado Popular Ciudad de Murcia
- Nicknames: El Ciudad, El City
- Founded: 2010
- Ground: José Barnés, Murcia, Spain
- Capacity: 2,500
- Chairman: José Francisco Navarro
- Manager: Paco Lorca
- League: Primera Autonómica
- 2025–26: Preferente Autonómica, 16th of 18 (relegated)
Home colours	Away colours

Club de Accionariado Popular Ciudad de Murcia is a Spanish football club based in Murcia. Founded in 2010, it currently plays in Primera Autonómica.

== History ==
The club was founded in October 2010 by a group of supporters of dissolved CF Ciudad de Murcia, which relocated in 2006, and was founded after CF Atlético Ciudad, its original reserve team which de facto acted as its first team for four years, was dissolved in 2010. The club is owned and democratically run by its supporters.

On September 25, 2011, Ciudad de Murcia played its first official game in Segunda Autonómica de Murcia, seventh tier, and defeated CDA Ciudad de Cehegín by 2–0. In its first season, Ciudad de Murcia promoted to Primera Autonómica after winning 22 of the 26 games played.

The club repeated the success in the next season, promoting to Preferente Autonómica despite finishing in the fourth position.

On May 10, 2015, Ciudad de Murcia promoted to Tercera División for the first time since its refoundation. It would remain in the fourth tier only two seasons before suffering its first relegation ever.

=== Club background ===
- CF Ciudad de Murcia - (1999–2006)
- CF Atlético Ciudad - (2007–2010)
- CAP Ciudad de Murcia - (2010–)

== Season to season ==
Season	Tier	Division	Place	Copa del Rey
2011–12	7	2ª Aut.	1st	
2012–13	6	1ª Aut.	4th	
2013–14	5	Pref. Aut.	6th	
2014–15	5	Pref. Aut.	2nd	
2015–16	4	3ª	13th	
2016–17	4	3ª	18th	
2017–18	5	Pref. Aut.	1st	
2018–19	4	3ª	18th	
2019–20	4	3ª	19th	
2020–21	4	3ª	9th / 2nd	
2021–22	5	3ª RFEF	9th	
2022–23	5	3ª Fed.	11th	
2023–24	5	3ª Fed.	16th	
2024–25	6	Pref. Aut.	6th	
2025–26	6	Pref. Aut.		

- 5 seasons in Tercera División
- 3 seasons in Tercera Federación/Tercera División RFEF

=== Detailed list of seasons ===
Season	League										Cup	Copa Federación	
Season	Tier	Division	Pos	P	W	D	L	F	A	Pts	Cup	Copa Federación	
2011–12	7	2ª Aut. (G. II)	1st	26	22	0	4	86	27	66			
2012–13	6	1ª Aut.	4th	32	16	10	6	67	31	58			
2013–14	5	Pref. Aut.	6th	31	13	6	12	44	50	45			
2014–15	5	Pref. Aut.	2nd	34	21	8	5	61	27	71			
2015–16	4	3ª (G. 13)	13th	34	11	6	17	45	56	36 (Note: 3 points docked.)		Regional Tournament	QF
2016–17	4	3ª (G. 13)	18th	38	11	4	23	41	63	38		Regional Tournament	QF
2017–18	5	Pref. Aut.	1st	34	22	7	5	63	29	73			
2018–19	4	3ª (G. 13)	18th (Note: Remained in the league after the exclusion of Jumilla due to unpaid wages to their players.)	42	12	8	22	43	70	44			
2019–20	4	3ª (G. 13)	19th (Note: League suspended due to the COVID-19 pandemic. Relegations were revoked.)	28	4	7	17	21	51	19			
2020–21	4	3ª (G. 13)	9th	20	5	6	9	13	18	21			
2021–22	5	3ª RFEF	9th	34	13	8	13	47	45	47			
2022–23	5	3ª Fed.	11th	30	9	8	13	26	31	35			

== Women's team ==
In February 2016, Ciudad de Murcia announced the creation of a women's team that would start competing in the Murcian Autonomous League. In its second season, the club promoted to Segunda División.

=== Season to season ===
Season	Level	Division	Place	Copa de la Reina
2016–17	3	Aut.	4th	
2017–18	3	Reg. Pref.	1st	
2018–19	2	2ª	14th (Note: Due to the creation of the new Primera División B, the team remained in the same league but it became the third level.)	
