= CP Racing Valverdeño =

Association football team in Spain

Racing Valverdeño
- Full name: Club Polideportivo Racing Valverdeño
- Founded: 1973
- Ground: San Roque, Valverde de Leganés, Badajoz, Extremadura, Spain
- Capacity: 2,000
- President: Antonio Bravo
- Manager: Alejandro Durán
- League: Primera Extremeña – Group 2
- 2024–25: Primera Extremeña – Group 2, 9th of 12
Home colours	Away colours

Club Polideportivo Racing Valverdeño is a football team based in Valverde de Leganés, Badajoz, in the autonomous community of Extremadura. Founded in 1973, the club play in Primera Extremeña – Group 2, holding home matches at the Campo de Fútbol Municipal San Roque, with a capacity of 2,000 people.

== History ==
Founded in 1973, Racing Valverdeño achieved their first-ever promotion to Tercera División in 1988.

== Season to season ==
Season	Tier	Division	Place	Copa del Rey
1975–76	6	2ª Reg.	4th	
1976–77	6	2ª Reg.	1st	
1977–78	6	1ª Reg.	12th	
1978–79	6	1ª Reg.	6th	
1979–80	6	1ª Reg.	6th	
1980–81	6	1ª Reg.	8th	
1981–82	6	1ª Reg.	8th	
1982–83	6	1ª Reg.	3rd	
1983–84	5	Reg. Pref.	12th	
1984–85	5	Reg. Pref.	6th	
1985–86	5	Reg. Pref.	9th	
1986–87	5	Reg. Pref.	12th	
1987–88	5	Reg. Pref.	3rd	
1988–89	4	3ª	19th	
1989–90	5	Reg. Pref.	6th	
1990–91	5	Reg. Pref.	2nd	
1991–92	4	3ª	20th	
1992–93	5	Reg. Pref.	13th	
1993–94	5	Reg. Pref.	7th	
1994–95	5	Reg. Pref.	11th	

Season	Tier	Division	Place	Copa del Rey
1995–96	5	Reg. Pref.	19th	
1996–97	6	1ª Reg.	4th	
1997–98	5	Reg. Pref.	8th	
1998–99	5	Reg. Pref.	5th	
1999–2000	5	Reg. Pref.	17th	
2000–01	5	Reg. Pref.	9th	
2001–02	5	Reg. Pref.	13th	
2002–03	5	Reg. Pref.	14th	
2003–04	5	Reg. Pref.	7th	
2004–05	5	Reg. Pref.	11th	
2005–06	5	Reg. Pref.	11th	
2006–07	5	Reg. Pref.	12th	
2007–08	5	Reg. Pref.	3rd	
2008–09	5	Reg. Pref.	18th	
2009–10	6	1ª Reg.	1st	
2010–11	5	Reg. Pref.	7th	
2011–12	5	Reg. Pref.	1st	
2012–13	4	3ª	14th	
2013–14	4	3ª	20th	
2014–15	5	Reg. Pref.	5th	

Season	Tier	Division	Place	Copa del Rey
2015–16	5	Reg. Pref.	3rd	
2016–17	5	1ª Ext.	7th	
2017–18	5	1ª Ext.	2nd	
2018–19	4	3ª	17th	
2019–20	4	3ª	19th	
2020–21	4	3ª	9th / 5th	
2021–22	6	1ª Ext.	4th	
2022–23	6	1ª Ext.	1st	
2023–24	5	3ª Fed.	16th	
2024–25	6	1ª Ext.	9th	
2025–26	6	1ª Ext.		

- 7 seasons in Tercera División
- 1 season in Tercera Federación
