= El Requexón =

Training ground of Real Oviedo

Ciudad Deportiva del Real Oviedo
- El Requexón
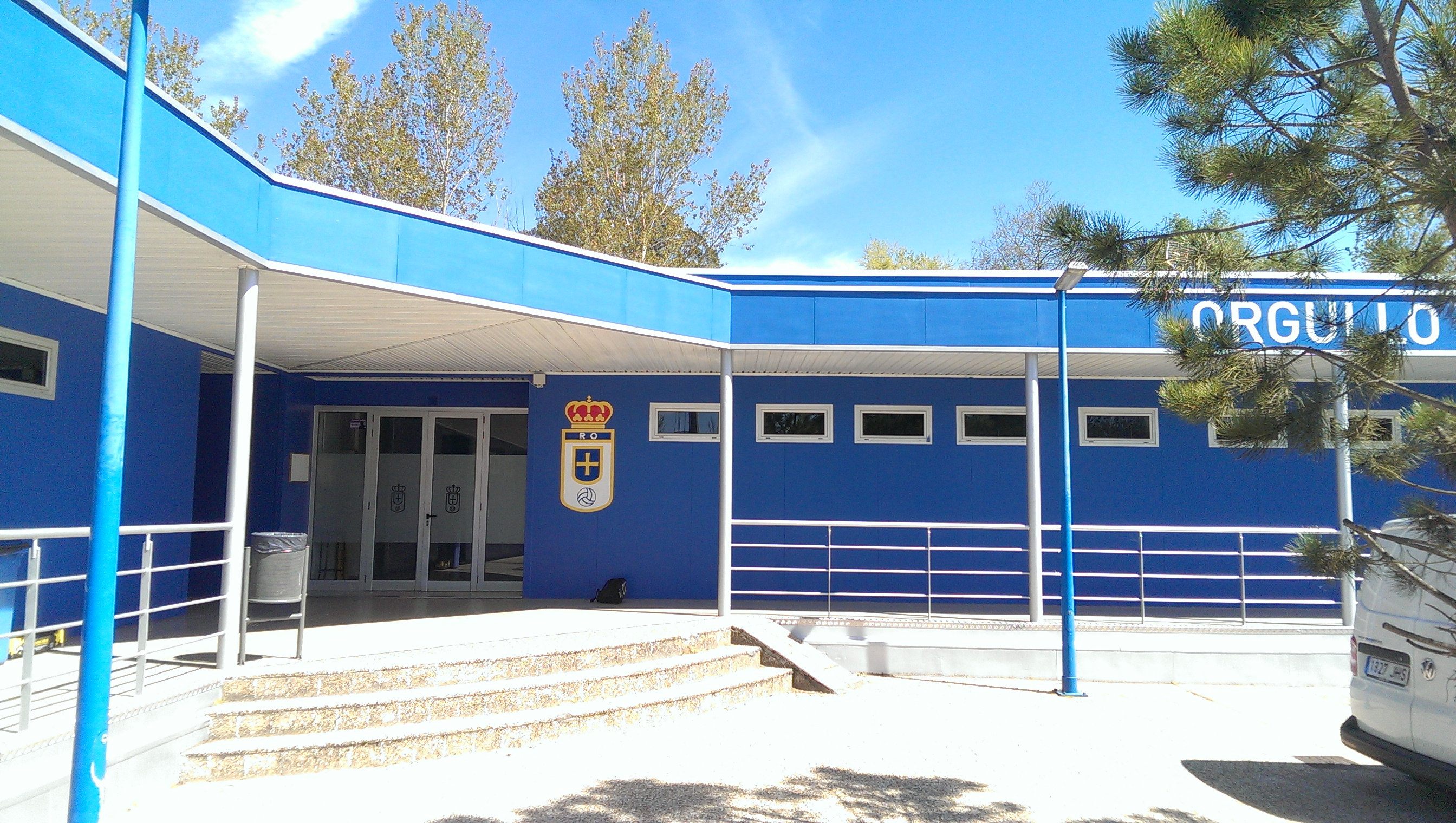
- The entrance to El Requexón
- Interactive map of Ciudad Deportiva del Real Oviedo
- Location: Oviedo; Asturias, Spain
- Coordinates: 43°24′54″N 05°49′27″W
- Owner: Ayan Faisal
- Capacity: 3,000
- Type: Football training ground

Construction
- Opened: 1969

Tenant
- Real Oviedo (training) (1969–present)

The Ciudad Deportiva del Real Oviedo, more commonly known as El Requexón, is the training ground and academy base of the Spanish football club Real Oviedo. Located at the northern outskirts of the city of Oviedo, the centre occupies an area of 80,447 m^{2}.

The first phase of the training centre was opened in 1969 by the efforts of then-club president Enrique Rubio Sanudo. Later in the 1980s, the second phase of the construction was completed by the efforts of then-president José Manuel Bango.

== Facilities ==
- Ciudad Deportiva Stadium with a capacity of 3,000 seats, is the home stadium of Real Oviedo Vetusta, the reserve team of Real Oviedo.
- 2 grass pitches.
- 1 artificial pitch.
- 1 mini grass pitches.
- Outdoor tennis courts.
- Service centre with gymnasium.
