= Yefri Reyes (footballer, born 1995) =

Dominican-Spanish footballer

Personal information
- Full name: Yefri Alexis Reyes González
- Date of birth: 23 August 1995 (age 31)
- Place of birth: San Cristóbal, Dominican Republic
- Height: 1.83 m (6 ft 0 in)
- Position: Centre back

Team information
- Current team: Atlético Vega Real
- Number: 4

Youth career
- 200?–2013: Llanes
- 2013–2014: Roces

Senior career*
Years	Team	Apps	(Gls)
2012–2013	Llanes	7	(0)
2014–2015	Llanes	15	(0)
2014–2015	Llanes B	10	(1)
2016	Atlántico	?	(1)
2017	Moca	0	(0)
2017–2018	Rayo Cantabria	10	(2)
2018–	Atlético Vega Real		

International career^{‡}
2016–	Dominican Republic	3	(0)
- * Club domestic league appearances and goals as of 19 November 2017 ‡ National team caps and goals as of 30 August 2016

Yefri Alexis Reyes González (born 23 August 1995) is a Dominican footballer who plays for Atlético Vega Real and the Dominican Republic national team as a centre back. He also holds Spanish citizenship.

== Club career ==
Born in San Cristóbal, Reyes moved to Llanes in 2002, aged seven, and developed his youth career mostly in CD Llanes, except for the final year, which he played at CD Roces. He made his senior debuts for Llanes on 11 November 2012, in Tercera División.

== International career ==
Reyes made his international debut for Dominican Republic on 26 March 2016, starting in a 1–2 loss against Curaçao for the 2017 Caribbean Cup qualification.
