= Yefri Reyes (footballer, born 1996) =

Venezuelan footballer

Personal information
- Full name: Yefri Antonio Reyes Pinto
- Date of birth: 22 May 1996 (age 30)
- Place of birth: Caracas, Venezuela
- Height: 1.75 m (5 ft 9 in)
- Position: Midfielder

Team information
- Current team: Monagas
- Number: 27

Youth career
- Chacarita Juniors

Senior career*
Years	Team	Apps	(Gls)
2017–2018	Chacarita Juniors	4	(0)
2019–	Monagas	8	(0)
- * Club domestic league appearances and goals as of 18:26, 11 May 2019 (UTC)

Yefri Antonio Reyes Pinto (born 22 May 1996) is a Venezuelan professional footballer who plays as a midfielder for Monagas.

== Career ==
Reyes began his career in Argentina with Chacarita Juniors. He was selected for his senior debut by Walter Coyette in July 2017, with the midfielder appearing for eighty-three minutes of a Copa Argentina defeat to Guillermo Brown. His league bow arrived nine months later during an Argentine Primera División game with Temperley, which was the first of three appearances in a year that ended with relegation to Primera B Nacional.

On 1 February 2019, it was announced that Reyes had signed for Venezuelan Primera División club Monagas.

== Personal life ==
Though born in Venezuela, Reyes is a nationalized citizen of Colombia.

== Career statistics ==
As of 11 May 2019.

Club statistics
Club	Season	League			Cup		League Cup		Continental		Other		Total	
Club	Season	Division	Apps	Goals	Apps	Goals	Apps	Goals	Apps	Goals	Apps	Goals	Apps	Goals
Chacarita Juniors	2017–18	Argentine Primera División	3	0	1	0	—		—		0	0	4	0
Chacarita Juniors	2018–19	Primera B Nacional	1	0	0	0	—		—		0	0	1	0
Chacarita Juniors	Total		4	0	1	0	—		—		0	0	5	0
Monagas	2019	Venezuelan Primera División	8	0	0	0	—		0	0	0	0	8	0
Career total			12	0	1	0	—		0	0	0	0	13	0
