= Estadio Baltasar Pujales =

Football stadium in Spain

Coordinates: 42°13′36.44″N 8°45′20.49″W

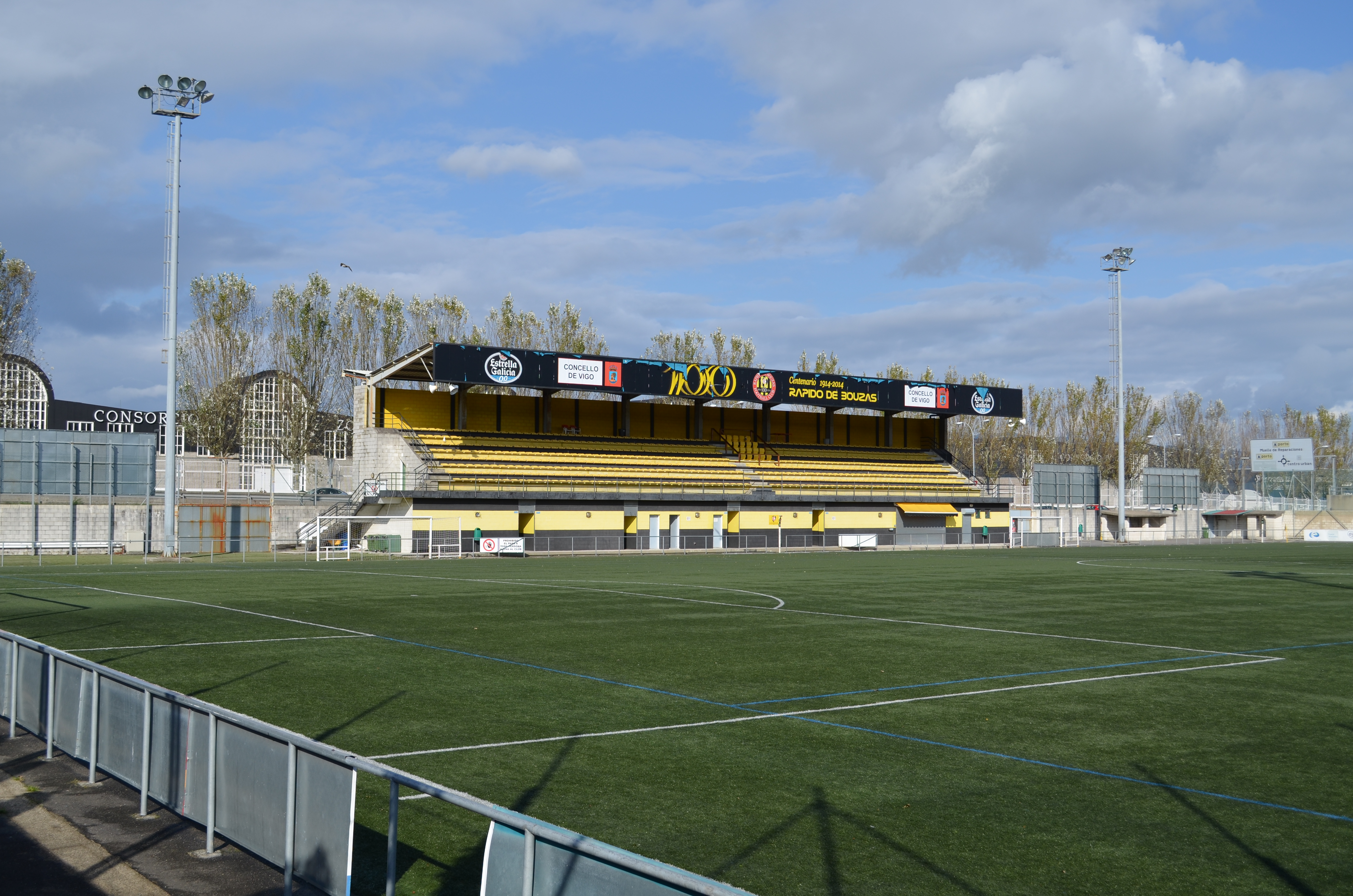
- Interactive map of Estadio Baltasar Pujales
- Location: Vigo, Spain
- Owner: Vigo Town Hall
- Capacity: 2,500
- Surface: Artificial turf
- Field size: 103 × 64 m

Construction
- Opened: March 2001

Tenant
- Rápido de Bouzas

Estadio Baltasar Pujales is a football stadium in Bouzas, Vigo, Spain, that hosts the home matches of Rapido de Bouzas. It can hold up to 2500 people. The stadium was renovated in 2009, and again in 2026.
