= CD Llanes =

Association football club in Spain

Coordinates: 43.420987°N 4.763742°W

Llanes
- Full name: Club Deportivo Llanes
- Founded: 21 March 1949; 77 years ago
- Ground: San José; Llanes, Asturias, Spain
- Capacity: 2,000
- President: Juan José Fernández González
- Head coach: Luis Arturo Ruiz-Capillas Cagigas
- League: Tercera Federación – Group 2
- 2025–26: Tercera Federación – Group 2, 12th of 18
- Website: cdllanes.com
Home colours	Away colours

Club Deportivo Llanes is a football team based in Llanes in the autonomous community of Asturias. Founded in 1949, the team plays in Tercera Federación – Group 2. The club's home ground is San José, which has a capacity of 2,000 spectators.

== History ==
CD Llanes was founded in 1949 and played its first 50 years in the Regional divisions. In 1999 the club achieves its first promotion ever to Tercera División, where it played almost every season since that year.

In 2009 and 2010, the club qualified for the promotion playoffs to Segunda División B. In its first attempt, Llanes was eliminated in the first round by Alicante B after a penalty shoot-out. Its second participation was better, as they eliminated Valladolid B in the first round, but they were beaten 6–0 by Tudelano in the second leg of the second round. Llanes came back to the playoffs in 2018, but again failed in the first round.

On 11 September 2019, the club won the Copa Federación.

== Season to season ==
Season	Tier	Division	Place	Copa del Rey
1949–50	5	2ª Reg.	2nd	
1950–51	5	2ª Reg.	8th	
1951–52	5	2ª Reg.	1st	
1952–53	4	1ª Reg.	12th	
1953–54	5	2ª Reg.		
1954–55	5	2ª Reg.		
1955–56	5	2ª Reg.		
1956–57	5	2ª Reg.		
1957–58	5	2ª Reg.	6th	
1958–59	5	2ª Reg.		
1959–60	5	2ª Reg.		
1960–61	5	2ª Reg.		
1961–62	5	2ª Reg.		
1962–63	5	2ª Reg.		
1963–64	5	2ª Reg.	9th	
1964–65	5	2ª Reg.	6th	
1965–66	5	2ª Reg.	11th	
1966–67	5	2ª Reg.	8th	
1967–1972	DNP			
1972–73	5	2ª Reg.	3rd	

Season	Tier	Division	Place	Copa del Rey
1973–74	6	2ª Reg.	2nd	
1974–75	5	2ª Reg. P.	9th	
1975–76	5	2ª Reg. P.	15th	
1976–77	5	2ª Reg. P.	15th	
1977–78	6	2ª Reg. P.	15th	
1978–79	6	1ª Reg.	20th	
1979–80	7	2ª Reg.	4th	
1980–81	7	2ª Reg.	3rd	
1981–82	7	2ª Reg.	3rd	
1982–83	7	2ª Reg.	2nd	
1983–84	7	2ª Reg.	6th	
1984–85	7	2ª Reg.	3rd	
1985–86	7	2ª Reg.	5th	
1986–87	7	2ª Reg.	6th	
1987–88	7	2ª Reg.	1st	
1988–89	6	1ª Reg.	5th	
1989–90	6	1ª Reg.	11th	
1990–91	6	1ª Reg.	2nd	
1991–92	5	Reg. Pref.	5th	
1992–93	5	Reg. Pref.	6th	

Season	Tier	Division	Place	Copa del Rey
1993–94	5	Reg. Pref.	5th	
1994–95	5	Reg. Pref.	12th	
1995–96	5	Reg. Pref.	6th	
1996–97	5	Reg. Pref.	15th	
1997–98	5	Reg. Pref.	16th	
1998–99	5	Reg. Pref.	1st	
1999–2000	4	3ª	9th	
2000–01	4	3ª	17th	
2001–02	4	3ª	9th	
2002–03	4	3ª	10th	
2003–04	4	3ª	12th	
2004–05	4	3ª	18th	
2005–06	5	Reg. Pref.	1st	
2006–07	4	3ª	13th	
2007–08	4	3ª	10th	
2008–09	4	3ª	4th	
2009–10	4	3ª	4th	
2010–11	4	3ª	14th	
2011–12	4	3ª	9th	
2012–13	4	3ª	18th	

Season	Tier	Division	Place	Copa del Rey
2013–14	5	Reg. Pref.	2nd	
2014–15	4	3ª	7th	
2015–16	4	3ª	9th	
2016–17	4	3ª	10th	
2017–18	4	3ª	4th	
2018–19	4	3ª	6th	
2019–20	4	3ª	6th	
2020–21	4	3ª	3rd / 6th	
2021–22	5	3ª RFEF	4th	
2022–23	5	3ª Fed.	8th	
2023–24	5	3ª Fed.	15th	
2024–25	6	1ª Astur.	3rd	
2025–26	5	3ª Fed.	12th	
2026–27	5	3ª Fed.		

- 20 seasons in Tercera División
- 5 seasons in Tercera Federación/Tercera División RFEF

== Honours ==
- Copa Federación de España (Asturias tournament): (1) 2019

== Women's team ==
Llanes had a women's team between 2001 and 2005, that played in the Regional league during four seasons. On 6 April 2019, the club announced the return of the section, starting to play in the 2019–20 season.

=== Season by season ===
Season	Division	Place	Copa de la Reina
2001–02	Regional	5th	
2002–03	Regional	4th	
2003–04	Regional	3rd	
2004–05	Regional	3rd	
2005–19	DNP		
2019–20	Regional	8th	

== Famous players ==
- (Dominican Republic) Yefri Reyes
- (Spain) Gerardo Noriega
- (Venezuela) Christopher Marques
