= CD Calamonte =

Association football team in Spain

Calamonte
- Full name: Club Deportivo Calamonte
- Founded: 1965
- Ground: Municipal, Calamonte, Extremadura, Spain
- Capacity: 2,000
- President: Antonio Barrero
- Manager: Pepe Arredondo
- League: Primera Extremeña – Group 4
- 2025–26: Tercera Federación – Group 14, 18th of 18 (relegated)
Home colours	Away colours

Club Deportivo Calamonte is a football team based in Calamonte, in the autonomous community of Extremadura. Founded in 1965, it plays in Primera Extremeña – Group 4, holding home matches at the Estadio Municipal de Calamonte, with a capacity of 2,000 people.

== Season to season ==
Season	Tier	Division	Place	Copa del Rey
1967–68	5	2ª Reg.	2nd	
1968–69	4	1ª Reg.	8th	
1969–70	4	1ª Reg.	11th	
1970–71	4	1ª Reg.	16th	
1971–72	4	1ª Reg.	18th	
1972–73	5	2ª Reg.	3rd	
1973–74	5	2ª Reg.	9th	
1974–75	5	1ª Reg.	8th	
1975–76	5	1ª Reg.	5th	
1976–77	5	1ª Reg.	11th	
1977–78	6	1ª Reg.	7th	
1978–79	6	1ª Reg.	3rd	
1979–80	6	1ª Reg.	10th	
1980–81	6	1ª Reg.	3rd	
1981–82	6	1ª Reg.	2nd	
1982–83	5	Reg. Pref.	4th	
1983–84	4	3ª	14th	
1984–85	4	3ª	18th	
1985–86	4	3ª	20th	
1986–87	5	Reg. Pref.	8th	

Season	Tier	Division	Place	Copa del Rey
1987–88	5	Reg. Pref.	7th	
1988–89	5	Reg. Pref.	13th	
1989–90	5	Reg. Pref.	4th	
1990–91	5	Reg. Pref.	12th	
1991–92	5	Reg. Pref.	14th	
1992–93	5	Reg. Pref.	17th	
1993–94	DNP			
1994–95	6	1ª Reg.	1st	
1995–96	5	Reg. Pref.	15th	
1996–97	5	Reg. Pref.	8th	
1997–98	5	Reg. Pref.	9th	
1998–99	5	Reg. Pref.	6th	
1999–2000	5	Reg. Pref.	6th	
2000–01	5	Reg. Pref.	3rd	
2001–02	4	3ª	20th	
2002–03	5	Reg. Pref.	10th	
2003–04	5	Reg. Pref.	10th	
2004–05	5	Reg. Pref.	15th	
2005–06	5	Reg. Pref.	13th	
2006–07	5	Reg. Pref.	7th	

Season	Tier	Division	Place	Copa del Rey
2007–08	5	Reg. Pref.	15th	
2008–09	5	Reg. Pref.	7th	
2009–10	5	Reg. Pref.	7th	
2010–11	5	Reg. Pref.	8th	
2011–12	5	Reg. Pref.	12th	
2012–13	5	Reg. Pref.	11th	
2013–14	5	Reg. Pref.	2nd	
2014–15	5	Reg. Pref.	2nd	
2015–16	4	3ª	7th	
2016–17	4	3ª	7th	
2017–18	4	3ª	9th	
2018–19	4	3ª	10th	
2019–20	4	3ª	14th	
2020–21	4	3ª	7th / 3rd	
2021–22	5	3ª RFEF	8th	
2022–23	5	3ª Fed.	9th	
2023–24	5	3ª Fed.	10th	
2024–25	5	3ª Fed.	13th	
2025–26	5	3ª Fed.	18th	
2026–27	6	1ª Ext.		

- 10 seasons in Tercera División
- 5 seasons in Tercera Federación/Tercera División RFEF
