= CD Valle de Egüés =

Association football club in Spain

Valle de Egüés
- Full name: Club Deportivo Valle de Egüés
- Founded: 1968
- Ground: Sarriguren, Egüés, Navarre, Spain
- Capacity: 2,000
- Chairman: (Spain) Miguel Ángel Orbáiz
- Manager: (Spain) César Sánchez
- League: Tercera Federación – Group 15
- 2025–26: Tercera Federación – Group 15, 12th of 18
Home colours	Away colours

Club Deportivo Valle de Egüés is a Spanish football team based in Egüés, in the autonomous community of Navarre. Founded in 1968, it plays in Tercera Federación – Group 15, holding home matches at Estadio Sarriguren, with a capacity of 2,000 seats.

== History ==
Club logo until 2000

=== Club background ===
- Club Deportivo Egüés (1968–2000)
- Club Deportivo Valle de Egüés (2000–present)

== Season to season ==
Season	Tier	Division	Place	Copa del Rey
1974–75	6	2ª Reg.	14th	
1975–76	6	2ª Reg.	8th	
1976–77	6	2ª Reg.	12th	
1977–78	7	2ª Reg.	7th	
1978–79	7	2ª Reg.	2nd	
1979–80	6	1ª Reg.	8th	
1980–81	6	1ª Reg.	1st	
1981–82	5	Reg. Pref.	12th	
1982–83	5	Reg. Pref.	6th	
1983–84	5	Reg. Pref.	8th	
1984–85	5	Reg. Pref.	11th	
1985–86	5	Reg. Pref.	6th	
1986–87	4	3ª	13th	
1987–88	4	3ª	15th	
1988–89	4	3ª	12th	
1989–90	4	3ª	15th	
1990–91	4	3ª	11th	
1991–92	4	3ª	11th	
1992–93	4	3ª	4th	
1993–94	4	3ª	16th	

Season	Tier	Division	Place	Copa del Rey
1994–95	4	3ª	13th	
1995–96	4	3ª	9th	
1996–97	4	3ª	7th	
1997–98	4	3ª	13th	
1998–99	4	3ª	10th	
1999–2000	4	3ª	7th	
2000–01	4	3ª	5th	
2001–02	4	3ª	5th	
2002–03	4	3ª	6th	
2003–04	4	3ª	2nd	
2004–05	4	3ª	1st	
2005–06	4	3ª	3rd	Preliminary
2006–07	4	3ª	1st	
2007–08	4	3ª	6th	Second round
2008–09	4	3ª	8th	
2009–10	4	3ª	7th	
2010–11	4	3ª	3rd	
2011–12	4	3ª	12th	
2012–13	4	3ª	11th	
2013–14	4	3ª	6th	

Season	Tier	Division	Place	Copa del Rey
2014–15	4	3ª	12th	
2015–16	4	3ª	7th	
2016–17	4	3ª	13th	
2017–18	4	3ª	11th	
2018–19	4	3ª	16th	
2019–20	4	3ª	10th	
2020–21	4	3ª	3rd / 6th	
2021–22	5	3ª RFEF	11th	
2022–23	5	3ª Fed.	1st	
2023–24	4	2ª Fed.	17th	Second round
2024–25	5	3ª Fed.	2nd	
2025–26	5	3ª Fed.	12th	First round
2026–27	5	3ª Fed.		

- 1 season in Segunda Federación
- 35 seasons in Tercera División
- 5 seasons in Tercera Federación/Tercera División RFEF

== Notable players ==
- (Spain) Pablo Orbaiz
