= CD Móstoles URJC =

Association football club in Spain

- Full name: Club Deportivo Móstoles URJC
- Founded: 1996
- Ground: Estadio El Soto
- Capacity: 14,000
- Chairman: Alfredo J. González
- Manager: Víctor González
- League: Tercera Federación – Group 7
- 2025–26: Tercera Federación – Group 7, 7th of 18
- Website: cdmostoles.es
Home colours	Away colours

Club Deportivo Móstoles URJC, formerly CDE El Soto and CD Juventud Móstoles, is a Spanish football team based in Móstoles, in the autonomous community of Madrid. Founded in 1996, it plays in Tercera Federación – Group 7, holding home games at Estadio El Soto, which has about 14,000-seat capacity.

== History ==
CD Móstoles URJC was founded on 14 June 1996, firstly with the name CDE El Soto. In 2005, the club inked a collaboration agreement with the Universidad Rey Juan Carlos (URJC).

=== Club background ===
- Club Deportivo Escola El Soto — (1996–99)
- Club Deportivo Juventud de Móstoles — (1999–2005)
- Club Deportivo Juventud URJC Móstoles — (2005–12)
- Club Deportivo Móstoles URJC — (2012–)

== Season to season ==
Season	Tier	Division	Place	Copa del Rey
2001–02	8	3ª Reg.	15th	
2002–03	8	3ª Reg.	12th	
2003–04	8	3ª Reg.	11th	
2004–05	8	3ª Reg.	8th	
2005–06	8	3ª Reg.	1st	
2006–07	7	2ª Reg.	5th	
2007–08	7	2ª Reg.	3rd	
2008–09	7	2ª Reg.	3rd	
2009–10	6	1ª Afic.	9th	
2010–11	6	1ª Afic.	3rd	
2011–12	5	Pref.	8th	
2012–13	5	Pref.	3rd	
2013–14	5	Pref.	1st	
2014–15	4	3ª	15th	
2015–16	4	3ª	11th	
2016–17	4	3ª	4th	
2017–18	4	3ª	8th	
2018–19	4	3ª	4th	
2019–20	4	3ª	7th	
2020–21	4	3ª	2nd / 3rd	

Season	Tier	Division	Place	Copa del Rey
2021–22	4	2ª RFEF	14th	
2022–23	5	3ª Fed.	5th	
2023–24	5	3ª Fed.	2nd	
2024–25	4	2ª Fed.	15th	First round
2025–26	5	3ª Fed.	7th	
2026–27	5	3ª Fed.		

- 2 seasons in Segunda Federación/Segunda División RFEF
- 7 seasons in Tercera División
- 4 seasons in Tercera Federación

== See also ==
- CD Móstoles
