= Estadio El Soto =

Stadium in Móstoles, Madrid, Spain

Coordinates: 40.32581°N 3.89430°W

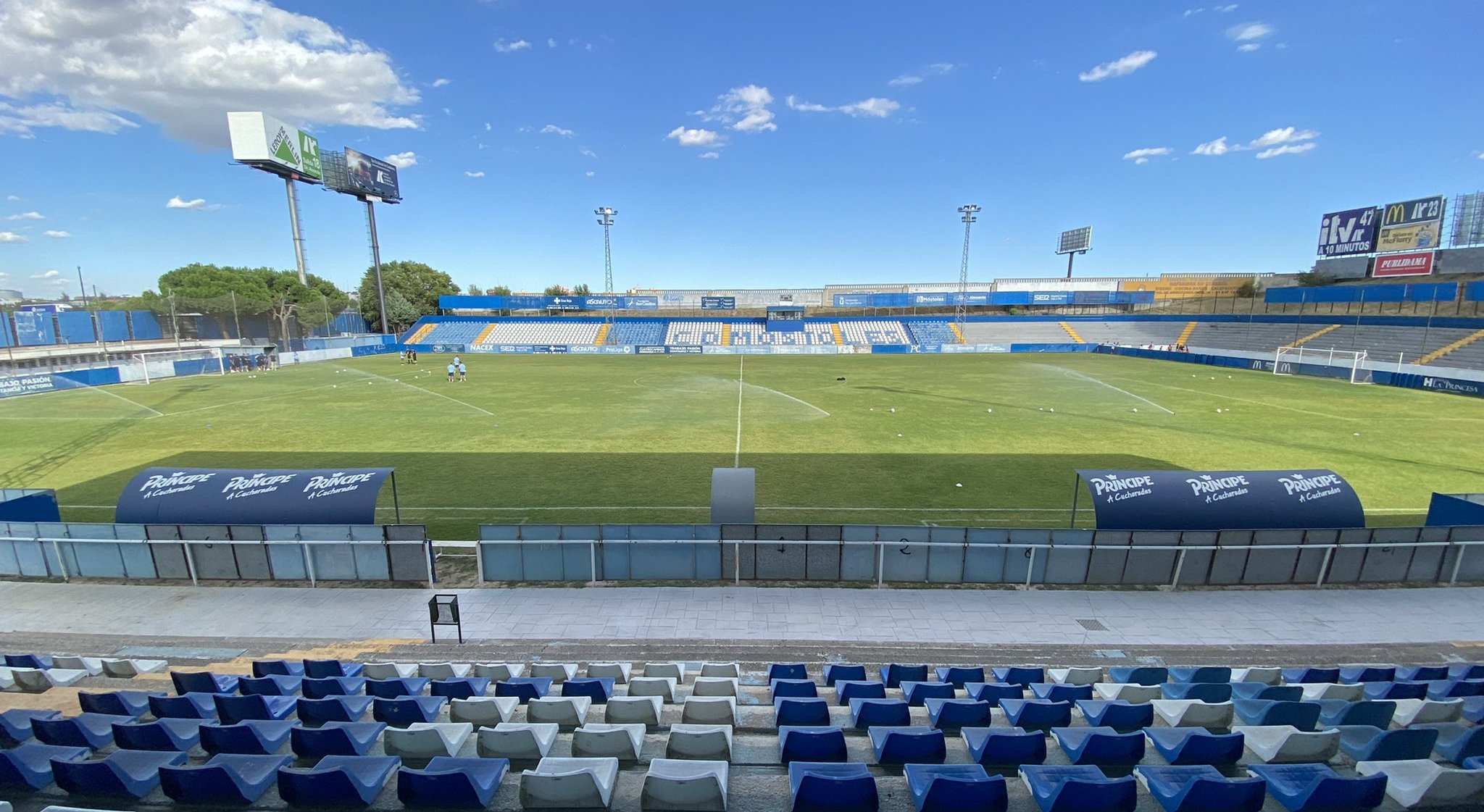
- Interactive map of Estadio El Soto
- Location: Móstoles, Madrid, Spain
- Capacity: 14,000
- Surface: Grass

Construction
- Opened: N/A

Tenant
- CD Móstoles URJC

Estadio El Soto is a stadium in Móstoles, Madrid, Spain. It is currently used for football matches and is the home stadium of CD Móstoles URJC. The stadium holds 14,000 spectators.
