= Valverde de Leganés =

Coordinates: 38°40′N 6°59′W

Valverde de Leganés, Spain
- Flag Coat of arms
- Interactive map of Valverde de Leganés, Spain
- Country: Spain
- Autonomous community: Extremadura
- Province: Badajoz
- Municipality: Valverde de Leganés

Area
  - Total: 73 km^{2} (28 sq mi)
- Elevation: 295 m (968 ft)

Population (2025-01-01)
  - Total: 4,230
  - Density: 58/km^{2} (150/sq mi)
- Time zone: UTC+1 (CET)
  - Summer (DST): UTC+2 (CEST)

Valverde de Leganés is a municipality located in the province of Badajoz, Extremadura, Spain. According to the 2005 census (INE), the municipality has a population of 3894 inhabitants.

== See also ==
- List of municipalities in Badajoz
