= SD Borja =

Association football club in Spain

Borja
- Full name: Sociedad Deportiva Borja
- Founded: 1923
- Ground: Manuel Meler, Borja, Aragon, Spain
- Capacity: 2,000
- Chairman: Miguel Lopez
- Manager: Juan Carlos Beltran
- League: Regional Preferente – Group 1
- 2025–26: Regional Preferente – Group 2, 5th of 18
Home colours	Away colours

Sociedad Deportiva Borja is a Spanish football team based in Borja, in the autonomous community of Aragon. Founded in 1923, it plays in Regional Preferente – Group 1, holding home matches at Estadio Municipal Manuel Meler.

== History ==
=== Club background ===
- Sociedad Deportiva Borja (1923–1939; 1994–)
- Club Deportivo Borja (1939–1946; 1951–1952; 1968–1987; 1988–1994)
- Club Atlético Borja (1952–1958)

== Season to season ==
Season	Tier	Division	Place	Copa del Rey
1942–43	5	3ª Reg.	2nd	
1943–44	4	1ª Reg.	2nd	
1944–45	4	1ª Reg.	1st	
1945–46	3	3ª	10th	
1946–1951	DNP			
1951–52	5	2ª Reg.	2nd	
1952–53	5	2ª Reg.	6th	
1953–54	5	2ª Reg.	2nd	
1954–55	5	2ª Reg.	6th	
1955–56	5	2ª Reg.	6th	
1956–1969	DNP			
1969–70	6	2ª Reg.	10th	
1970–71	6	2ª Reg.	4th	
1971–72	6	2ª Reg.	3rd	
1972–73	6	2ª Reg.	6th	
1973–74	6	2ª Reg.	2nd	
1974–75	5	1ª Reg.	6th	
1975–76	5	1ª Reg.	11th	
1976–77	5	1ª Reg.	12th	
1977–78	6	1ª Reg.	1st	

Season	Tier	Division	Place	Copa del Rey
1978–79	5	Reg. Pref.	11th	
1979–80	5	Reg. Pref.	9th	
1980–81	5	Reg. Pref.	12th	
1981–82	5	Reg. Pref.	18th	
1982–83	6	1ª Reg.	14th	
1983–84	6	1ª Reg.	(R)	
1984–85	7	2ª Reg.	9th	
1985–86	7	2ª Reg.	2nd	
1986–87	7	2ª Reg.	6th	
1987–88	DNP			
1988–89	7	2ª Reg.	1st	
1989–90	6	1ª Reg.	6th	
1990–91	6	1ª Reg.	9th	
1991–92	6	1ª Reg.	10th	
1992–93	6	1ª Reg.	4th	
1993–94	6	1ª Reg.	2nd	
1994–95	5	Reg. Pref.	6th	
1995–96	5	Reg. Pref.	13th	
1996–97	5	Reg. Pref.	7th	
1997–98	5	Reg. Pref.	11th	

Season	Tier	Division	Place	Copa del Rey
1998–99	5	Reg. Pref.	11th	
1999–2000	5	Reg. Pref.	9th	
2000–01	5	Reg. Pref.	15th	
2001–02	6	1ª Reg.	9th	
2002–03	6	1ª Reg.	7th	
2003–04	6	1ª Reg.	1st	
2004–05	5	Reg. Pref.	14th	
2005–06	5	Reg. Pref.	15th	
2006–07	6	1ª Reg.	2nd	
2007–08	5	Reg. Pref.	15th	
2008–09	6	1ª Reg.	11th	
2009–10	6	1ª Reg.	1st	
2010–11	5	Reg. Pref.	7th	
2011–12	5	Reg. Pref.	1st	
2012–13	4	3ª	7th	
2013–14	4	3ª	8th	
2014–15	4	3ª	6th	
2015–16	4	3ª	12th	
2016–17	4	3ª	6th	
2017–18	4	3ª	2nd	

Season	Tier	Division	Place	Copa del Rey
2018–19	4	3ª	5th	
2019–20	4	3ª	7th	
2020–21	4	3ª	5th	
2021–22	5	3ª RFEF	15th	
2022–23	6	Reg. Pref.	1st	
2023–24	5	3ª Fed.	17th	
2024–25	6	Reg. Pref.	7th	
2025–26	6	Reg. Pref.		

- 10 seasons in Tercera División
- 2 seasons in Tercera Federación/Tercera División RFEF
