= UCD Burladés =

Association football club in Spain

Burladés
- Full name: Unión Club Deportivo Burladés
- Founded: 1964 (as Club Burladés)
- Ground: Ripagaina, Burlada, Navarre, Spain
- Capacity: 4,000
- Chairman: Patxi Bator Bernal
- Manager: Jonathan Unanua
- League: Primera Autonómica
- 2025–26: Primera Autonómica, 12th of 18
Home colours	Away colours

Unión Club Deportivo Burladés is a Spanish football team based in Burlada, in the autonomous community of Navarre. Founded in 1964 as Club Burladés, the club changed to its current name in 1984, and it plays in Primera Autonómica, holding home matches at Estadio Ripagaina.

== History ==
Football had been played in Burlada even before the 1920s. In 1923 a group of enthusiasts founded the club, named Athletic Burladés.

In the 2017-18 season the club finished 3rd in the Tercera División, Group 15.

== Season to season ==
Season	Tier	Division	Place	Copa del Rey
1965–66	5	2ª Reg.	4th	
1966–67	5	2ª Reg.	3rd	
1967–68	5	2ª Reg.	6th	
1968–69	5	2ª Reg.	1st	
1969–70	5	2ª Reg.	4th	
1970–71	5	2ª Reg.	2nd	
1971–72	4	1ª Reg.	4th	
1972–73	4	1ª Reg.	4th	
1973–74	4	1ª Reg.	7th	
1974–75	4	Reg. Pref.	10th	
1975–76	4	Reg. Pref.	15th	
1976–77	4	Reg. Pref.	11th	
1977–78	5	Reg. Pref.	6th	
1978–79	5	Reg. Pref.	11th	
1979–80	5	Reg. Pref.	3rd	
1980–81	4	3ª	17th	
1981–82	4	3ª	18th	
1982–83	4	3ª	18th	
1983–84	4	3ª	18th	
1984–85	5	Reg. Pref.	7th	

Season	Tier	Division	Place	Copa del Rey
1985–86	5	Reg. Pref.	4th	
1986–87	4	3ª	14th	
1987–88	4	3ª	9th	
1988–89	4	3ª	11th	
1989–90	4	3ª	10th	
1990–91	4	3ª	5th	
1991–92	4	3ª	9th	First round
1992–93	4	3ª	11th	
1993–94	4	3ª	5th	
1994–95	4	3ª	3rd	
1995–96	4	3ª	5th	
1996–97	4	3ª	11th	
1997–98	4	3ª	8th	
1998–99	4	3ª	9th	
1999–2000	4	3ª	5th	
2000–01	4	3ª	16th	
2001–02	4	3ª	4th	
2002–03	4	3ª	15th	
2003–04	4	3ª	3rd	
2004–05	4	3ª	8th	

Season	Tier	Division	Place	Copa del Rey
2005–06	4	3ª	9th	
2006–07	4	3ª	10th	
2007–08	4	3ª	20th	
2008–09	5	Reg. Pref.	5th	
2009–10	5	Reg. Pref.	3rd	
2010–11	5	Reg. Pref.	1st	
2011–12	4	3ª	15th	
2012–13	4	3ª	8th	
2013–14	4	3ª	13th	
2014–15	4	3ª	8th	
2015–16	4	3ª	8th	
2016–17	4	3ª	7th	
2017–18	4	3ª	4th	
2018–19	4	3ª	10th	
2019–20	4	3ª	9th	
2020–21	4	3ª	6th / 4th	
2021–22	5	3ª RFEF	12th	
2022–23	5	3ª Fed.	11th	
2023–24	5	3ª Fed.	13th	
2024–25	5	3ª Fed.	15th	

Season	Tier	Division	Place	Copa del Rey
2025–26	6	1ª Aut.		

- 36 seasons in Tercera División
- 4 seasons in Tercera Federación/Tercera División RFEF
