= Rápido de Bouzas =

- Full name: Club Rápido de Bouzas
- Nickname: Los Aurinegros
- Founded: 1914
- Ground: Baltasar Pujales, Bouzas, Galicia, Spain
- Capacity: 1,500
- President: (Spain) Manuel Pedro Seoane
- Head coach: (Spain) Milo Abelleira
- League: Primera Futgal – Group 6
- 2025–26: Primera Futgal – Group 6, 6th of 18
- Website: http://www.rapidodebouzas.com
Home colours	Away colours

Club Rápido de Bouzas is a Spanish football team based in Bouzas, parish of Vigo, in the autonomous community of Galicia. Founded in 1914 it currently plays in Primera Futgal – Group 6, holding home games at Estadio Baltasar Pujales, which has a capacity of 2,500 spectators.

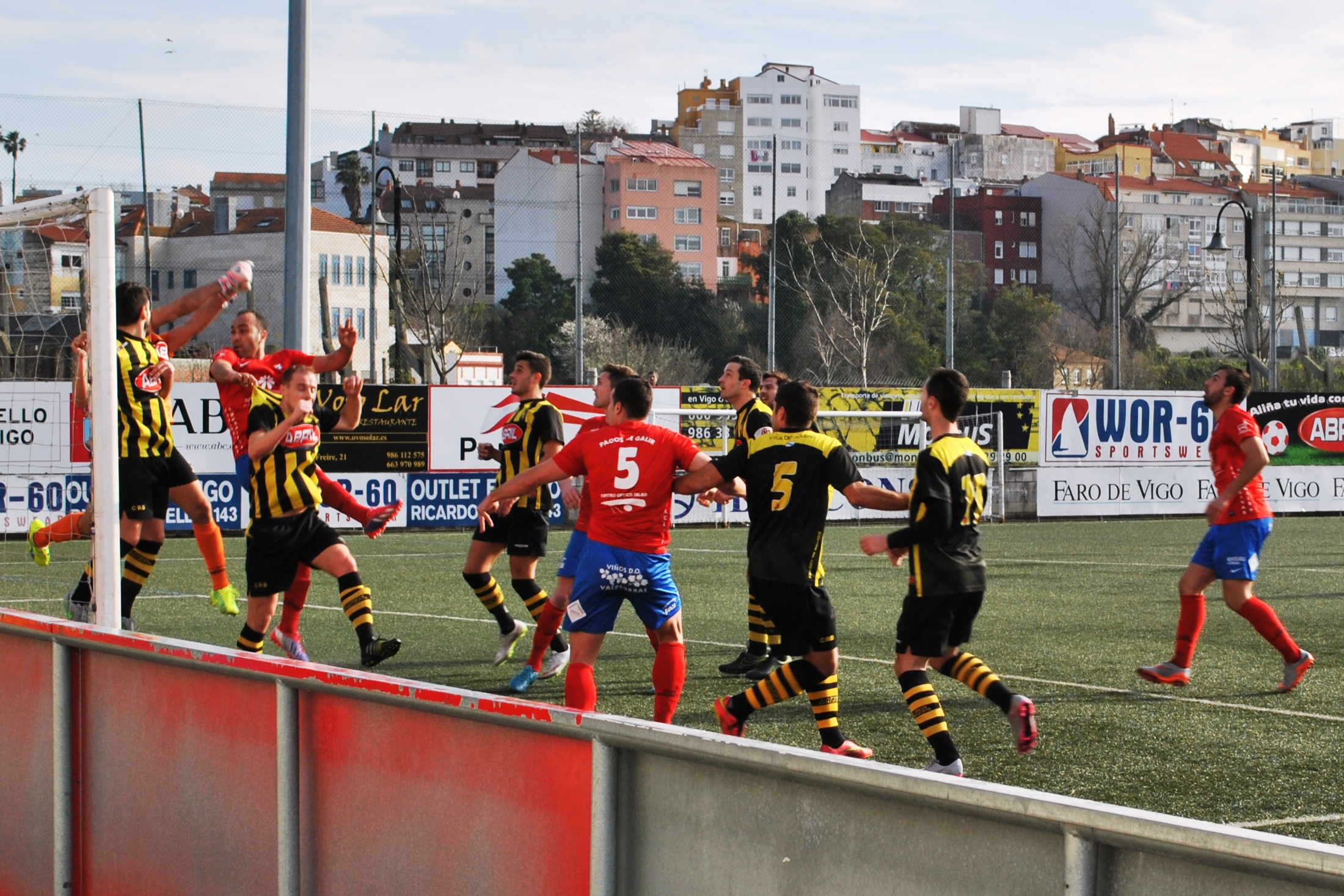
A match against CD Barco in March 2016.

== History ==
After playing their entire history between Tercera División and the Galician regional leagues, Rápido de Bouzas was promoted for the first time ever to Segunda División B on 25 June 2017. Their debut was quite successful, as the club finished 5th among 20 teams.

In the 2018–19 season the club finished 17th and was relegated back to Tercera. On 13 June 2019, Miguel Fernández was appointed the manager of Rápido.

== Season to season ==
Season	Tier	Division	Place	Copa del Rey
1942–43	4	1ª Reg.		
1943–44	5	1ª Reg.	1st	
1944–45	4	Serie A	1st	
1945–46	4	Serie A	1st	
1946–47	4	Serie A	(R)	
1947–1961	DNP			
1961–62	5	1ª Reg.	2nd	
1962–63	4	Serie A	4th	
1963–64	4	Serie A	4th	
1964–65	4	Serie A	1st	
1965–66	3	3ª	8th	
1966–67	3	3ª	10th	
1967–68	3	3ª	13th	
1968–1987	DNP			
1987–88	7	2ª Reg.	12th	
1988–89	7	2ª Reg.	5th	
1989–90	7	2ª Reg.	6th	
1990–91	7	2ª Reg.	1st	
1991–92	6	1ª Reg.	11th	
1992–93	6	1ª Reg.	1st	

Season	Tier	Division	Place	Copa del Rey
1993–94	5	Reg. Pref.	10th	
1994–95	5	Reg. Pref.	8th	
1995–96	5	Reg. Pref.	8th	
1996–97	5	Reg. Pref.	10th	
1997–98	5	Reg. Pref.	3rd	
1998–99	5	Reg. Pref.	2nd	
1999–2000	4	3ª	12th	
2000–01	4	3ª	14th	
2001–02	4	3ª	5th	
2002–03	4	3ª	4th	
2003–04	4	3ª	14th	
2004–05	4	3ª	1st	
2005–06	4	3ª	15th	Preliminary
2006–07	4	3ª	12th	
2007–08	4	3ª	9th	
2008–09	4	3ª	15th	
2009–10	4	3ª	10th	
2010–11	4	3ª	10th	
2011–12	4	3ª	8th	
2012–13	4	3ª	8th	

Season	Tier	Division	Place	Copa del Rey
2013–14	4	3ª	10th	
2014–15	4	3ª	8th	
2015–16	4	3ª	8th	
2016–17	4	3ª	2nd	
2017–18	3	2ª B	5th	First round
2018–19	3	2ª B	17th	First round
2019–20	4	3ª	18th	
2020–21	4	3ª	6th / 4th	
2021–22	5	3ª RFEF	6th	
2022–23	5	3ª Fed.	3rd	
2023–24	5	3ª Fed.	15th	
2024–25	6	Pref. Futgal	18th	
2025–26	7	1ª Futgal		

- 2 seasons in Segunda División B
- 23 seasons in Tercera División
- 3 seasons in Tercera Federación/Tercera División RFEF

== Honours ==
Tercera División

- Winners (1): 2004–05

== Current squad ==
As of 15 October 2018

Note: Flags indicate national team as defined under FIFA eligibility rules; some limited exceptions apply. Players may hold more than one non-FIFA nationality.

No.	Pos.	Nation	Player
—	MF	ESP	Pablo Antas
—	MF	ESP	Toni Jou
—	MF	ESP	Sergio Santos
—	MF	ESP	Javi Sánchez
—	MF	MAR	Youssef Al Watani
—	FW	ESP	Yelco Alfaya

No.	Pos.	Nation	Player
—	FW	ESP	Miguel Duque
—	FW	ESP	Pablo Carnero
—	FW	ESP	Carlitos
—	FW	ESP	Edgar Agudo
—	FW	ESP	Rodri Alonso
—	FW	ESP	Berni
