= CD Huarte =

Association football club in Spain

Huarte
- Full name: Club Deportivo Huarte
- Founded: 1975
- Ground: Areta, Huarte/Uharte, Navarre, Spain
- Capacity: 1,500
- Chairman: (Spain) Ramón Aznar
- Manager: (Spain) Pedro Sanchez
- League: Tercera Federación – Group 15
- 2025–26: Tercera Federación – Group 15, 6th of 18
Home colours	Away colours

Club Deportivo Huarte is a Spanish football team based in Huarte/Uharte in the autonomous community of Navarre. Founded in 1975, it plays in Tercera Federación – Group 15. Its stadium is Estadio Areta with a capacity of 1,500 seaters.

== Season to season ==
Season	Tier	Division	Place	Copa del Rey
1976–77	6	2ª Reg.	2nd	
1977–78	6	1ª Reg.	12th	
1978–79	6	1ª Reg.	13th	
1979–80	7	2ª Reg.	5th	
1980–81	7	2ª Reg.	7th	
1981–82	7	2ª Reg.	7th	
1982–83	7	2ª Reg.	3rd	
1983–84	6	1ª Reg.	10th	
1984–85	6	1ª Reg.	14th	
1985–86	7	2ª Reg.	6th	
1986–87	6	1ª Reg.	4th	
1987–88	6	1ª Reg.	3rd	
1988–89	6	1ª Reg.	1st	
1989–90	6	1ª Reg.	1st	
1990–91	5	Reg. Pref.	9th	
1991–92	5	Reg. Pref.	7th	
1992–93	5	Reg. Pref.	11th	
1993–94	5	Reg. Pref.	8th	
1994–95	5	Reg. Pref.	7th	
1995–96	5	Reg. Pref.	6th	

Season	Tier	Division	Place	Copa del Rey
1996–97	5	Reg. Pref.	7th	
1997–98	5	Reg. Pref.	1st	
1998–99	4	3ª	15th	
1999–2000	4	3ª	19th	
2000–01	5	Reg. Pref.	2nd	
2001–02	5	Reg. Pref.	8th	
2002–03	5	Reg. Pref.	2nd	
2003–04	4	3ª	14th	
2004–05	4	3ª	15th	
2005–06	4	3ª	4th	
2006–07	4	3ª	7th	
2007–08	4	3ª	16th	
2008–09	4	3ª	9th	
2009–10	4	3ª	17th	
2010–11	4	3ª	13th	
2011–12	4	3ª	13th	
2012–13	4	3ª	7th	
2013–14	4	3ª	11th	
2014–15	4	3ª	9th	
2015–16	4	3ª	16th	

Season	Tier	Division	Place	Copa del Rey
2016–17	4	3ª	10th	
2017–18	4	3ª	15th	
2018–19	4	3ª	11th	
2019–20	4	3ª	5th	
2020–21	4	3ª	4th / 2nd	
2021–22	5	3ª RFEF	4th	
2022–23	5	3ª Fed.	5th	
2023–24	5	3ª Fed.	5th	
2024–25	5	3ª Fed.	7th	
2025–26	5	3ª Fed.	6th	
2026–27	5	3ª Fed.		

- 20 seasons in Tercera División
- 6 seasons in Tercera Federación/Tercera División RFEF
