= 2016–17 Copa Federación de España =

Copa RFEF

Tournament details
- Country: Spain
- Teams: 32 (in national phase)

Final positions
- Champions: Atlético Saguntino (1st title)
- Runners-up: Fuenlabrada

Tournament statistics
- Matches played: 60
- Goals scored: 161 (2.68 per match)

The 2016–17 Copa Federación de España was the 24th edition of the Copa Federación de España, also known as Copa RFEF, a knockout competition for Spanish football clubs in Segunda División B and Tercera División. Atlético Baleares was the defending champion.

The champion would win the trophy, a cash prize of €90,152 and the qualification for the next year tournament. The runner-up would receive a cash prize of €30,051 and every semifinalist €12,020. Additionally, each winner of autonomous community tournament would receive €3,005.

The competition began in late July 2016 with the first games of the Asturias, Castile-La Mancha and Extremadura tournaments and finished on 6 April 2017 with the final of national phase.

Atlético Saguntino achieved its first national title ever after defeating Fuenlabrada in the finals.

== Autonomous Communities tournaments ==
=== West Andalusia and Ceuta tournament ===
Four teams of the Group 10 of Tercera División registered for this tournament. Semifinals were drawn on 3 August 2016.

Semi-finals
24 and 31 August
San Fernando	9	4	13
Alcalá	0	0	0
20 and 31 August
Algeciras	1	0	1
Real Betis B	3	1	4

Final
7 and 14 September
San Fernando	1	1	2
Real Betis B	1	0	1

==== Semifinals ====
First leg

20 August 2016	Algeciras	1–3	Real Betis B	Algeciras
21:00	David Camps 40' (pen.)	Report	Aitor 19', 70'; Juanma 53'	Stadium: Nuevo Mirador

24 August 2016	San Fernando	9–0	Alcalá	San Fernando
21:00	Iván 8', 76'; Juanma 15', 28', 62'; Dani Martínez 49', 64'; Moya 71' (o.g.); Francis 83'	Report		Stadium: Bahía Sur; Referee: Álvarez Rodríguez

Second leg

31 August 2016	Real Betis B	1–0 (4–1 agg.)	Algeciras	Seville
18:30	Sergio Navarro 50'	Report		Stadium: Luis del Sol

31 August 2016	Alcalá	0–4 (0–13 agg.)	San Fernando	Alcalá de Guadaira
20:30		Report	Fran Martínez 30'; Fernando Carralero 36'; Sergio Jiménez 65'; Espinar 70'	Stadium: Ciudad de Alcalá

==== Final ====
First leg

7 September 2016	San Fernando	1–1	Real Betis B	San Fernando
21:00	Édgar 7'	Report	Narváez (penalty missed) 20'; Julio 56'	Stadium: Bahía Sur

Second leg

14 September 2016	Real Betis B	0–1 (1–2 agg.)	San Fernando	Seville
17:30	Sergio Navarro (penalty missed) 90'	Report	Regino 53'	Stadium: Luis del Sol

=== East Andalusia and Melilla tournament ===
Two teams registered to play the tournament. The Andalusia Football Federation determined the order of the games on 3 August 2016.

Final
7 and 14 September
Loja	0	2	2
Linares	1	4	5

==== Final ====
First leg

7 September 2016	Loja	0–1	Linares	Loja
20:30		Report	Fran Lara 28'	Stadium: Medina Lauxa; Attendance: 250

Second leg

14 September 2016	Linares	4–2 (5–2 agg.)	Loja	Linares
21:00	Víctor Curto 5', 46', 67'; Mario Sánchez 86'	Report	Cristian Arco 20'; Del Moral 66'	Stadium: Linarejos

=== Aragon tournament ===
Quarter-finals
6 August
Binéfar	0 (3)
Sariñena	0 (4)
10 August
Deportivo Aragón	0
Teruel	3
7 August
Utebo	0 (4)
Almudévar	0 (5)
10 August
Ejea	2 (4)
Tarazona	2 (3)

Semi-finals
13 August
Sariñena	0
Teruel	2
14 August
Almudévar	0
Ejea	1

Final
21 August
Teruel	2
Ejea	0

==== Quarter-finals ====
6 August 2016	Binéfar	0–0 (3–4 p)	Sariñena	Binéfar
19:00		Report		Stadium: Los Olmos

7 August 2016	Utebo	0–0 (4–5 p)	Almudévar	Utebo
11:00		Report		Stadium: Santa Ana

10 August 2016	Deportivo Aragón	0–3	Teruel	Zaragoza
19:30	Guti (penalty missed) 15'	Report	Diego Gómez 29' (pen.), 85'; Acerete 90'	Stadium: Ciudad Deportiva

10 August 2016	Ejea	2–2 (4–3 p)	Tarazona	Ejea de los Caballeros
20:30	Ramón 44'; Rodríguez 90'	Report	Oli 70', 85'	Stadium: Luchán

==== Semifinals ====
13 August 2016	Sariñena	0–2	Teruel	Sariñena
19:00		Report	Cabetas 42'; Emilio 47'	Stadium: El Carmen; Referee: Sánchez López

14 August 2016	Almudévar	0–1	Ejea	Almudévar
19:00		Report	Jorge Rodríguez 1'	Stadium: La Corona

==== Final ====
21 August 2016	Teruel	2–0	Ejea	Teruel
19:00	Juanma 27'; Diego Gómez 64'	Report		Stadium: Pinilla

=== Asturias tournament ===
As usual in Asturias, the twelve best teams between Segunda División B and Tercera División who did not qualify for the Copa del Rey played this tournament. The draw was held on 20 July 2016 in the Prince Felipe Auditorium in Oviedo. The champion would get a prize of €3,000 and the 50% of the income in the final game, played in a neutral venue.

==== Preliminary round ====
===== Group A =====
Pos	Team	Pld	W	D	L	GF	GA	GD	Pts	Qualification	COV	TUI	MAR
1	Covadonga	4	1	3	0	5	3	+2	6	Qualification to semifinals	—	2–2	2–0
2	Tuilla	4	1	3	0	5	4	+1	6		1–1	—	1–0
3	Marino Luanco	4	0	2	2	1	4	−3	2		0–0	1–1	—

Source: Futbolasturiano.es
Rules for classification: 1) Points; 2) Head-to-head results; 3) Goal difference; 4) Number of goals scored

30 July 2016	Marino Luanco	0–0	Covadonga	Luanco, Gozón
19:30		Report		Stadium: Miramar; Attendance: 250; Referee: González González

3 August 2016	Covadonga	2–2	Tuilla	Oviedo
20:15	Monasterio 31'; Diego 81'	Report	Ponte 22'; Kike Fanjul 36' (pen.)	Stadium: Juan Antonio Álvarez Rabanal; Attendance: 150; Referee: Nieto Martínez

6 August 2016	Tuilla	1–0	Marino Luanco	Tuilla, Langreo
19:00	Ponte 69'	Report		Stadium: El Candín; Attendance: 200; Referee: Valdés Díaz

10 August 2016	Covadonga	2–0	Marino Luanco	Oviedo
20:15	Diego 76', 80'	Report		Stadium: José Antonio Álvarez Rabanal; Referee: Peláez Fernández

14 August 2016	Tuilla	1–1	Covadonga	Tuilla, Langreo
19:00	Diego García 66'	Report	Sandoval 73'	Stadium: El Candín; Attendance: 120; Referee: Pérez Rato

17 August 2016	Marino Luanco	1–1	Tuilla	Luanco, Gozón
20:00	Jairo Cárcaba 35'	Report	Abel 70'	Stadium: Miramar; Attendance: 170; Referee: Muñoz Suárez

===== Group B =====
Pos	Team	Pld	W	D	L	GF	GA	GD	Pts	Qualification	SPO	OVI	CEA
1	Sporting Gijón B	4	3	1	0	6	3	+3	10	Qualification to semifinals	—	0–0	2–1
2	Oviedo B	4	1	2	1	3	3	0	5		1–2	—	1–0
3	Ceares	4	0	1	3	3	6	−3	1		1–2	1–1	—

Source: Futbolasturiano.es
Rules for classification: 1) Points; 2) Head-to-head results; 3) Goal difference; 4) Number of goals scored

31 July 2016	Sporting Gijón B	2–1	Ceares	Gijón
18:00	Víctor Ruiz 47'; Rubén 80'	Report	Marcos Iglesias 20'	Stadium: Pepe Ortiz; Attendance: 400; Referee: Ladreda Mochales

3 August 2016	Ceares	1–1	Oviedo B	Gijón
19:00	Marcos Iglesias 60'	Report	Prendes 52'	Stadium: La Cruz; Attendance: 250; Referee: Cano Fernández

7 August 2016	Oviedo B	1–2	Sporting Gijón B	Oviedo
12:00	David Álvarez 55'	Report	Álvaro 89'; Riki 95'	Stadium: El Requexón; Attendance: 300; Referee: Barbeira Juste

10 August 2016	Ceares	1–2	Sporting Gijón B	Gijón
19:00	Jorge Cayarga 22'	Report	Sanabria 10'; Jaime Santos 92' (pen.)	Stadium: La Cruz; Attendance: 300; Referee: Baniela García

14 August 2016	Oviedo B	1–0	Ceares	Oviedo
12:00	Steven 93'	Report		Stadium: El Requexón; Attendance: 100; Referee: Fernández Martínez

17 August 2016	Sporting Gijón B	0–0	Oviedo B	Gijón
18:30		Report		Stadium: Pepe Ortiz; Attendance: 300; Referee: Morís Martínez

===== Group C =====
Pos	Team	Pld	W	D	L	GF	GA	GD	Pts	Qualification	LAN	LLA	COL
1	Langreo	4	2	0	2	8	6	+2	6	Qualification to semifinals	—	4–3	4–1
2	Llanes	4	2	0	2	7	8	−1	6		1–0	—	0–2
3	Colunga	4	2	0	2	6	7	−1	6		1–0	2–3	—

Source: Futbolasturiano.es
Rules for classification: 1) Points; 2) Head-to-head results; 3) Goal difference; 4) Number of goals scored

30 July 2016	Llanes	4–3	Langreo	Llanes
19:15	Cristian 13', 80' (pen.); Raúl 55'; Rubén 90+3'	Report	Omar 15'; Luis Nuño 90', 90+1'	Stadium: San José; Attendance: 100; Referee: Romero Garcia

3 August 2016	Llanes	0–2	Colunga	Llanes
19:00		Report	Zucu 27'; José Ángel 87'	Stadium: San José; Attendance: 100; Referee: Álvarez Lana

7 August 2016	Colunga	1–0	Langreo	Colunga
19:00	Enol 87'	Report		Stadium: Santianes; Attendance: 175; Referee: Bermejo Ferrero

10 August 2016	Langreo	1–0	Llanes	La Felguera, Langreo
19:00	Nacho Calvillo 83'	Report		Stadium: Ganzábal; Attendance: 200; Referee: Cruzado Vicente

14 August 2016	Colunga	2–3	Llanes	Colunga
18:30	Marcos 7'; José Ángel 68'	Report	Cristian 49', 65'; Nahuel 60' (o.g.)	Stadium: Santianes; Attendance: 90; Referee: Gao Aladro

17 August 2016	Langreo	4–1	Colunga	La Felguera, Langreo
19:00	Espolita 11'; Omar 43'; Pablo Acebal 56'; Jairo 58'	Report	Abraham 48' (pen.)	Stadium: Ganzábal; Attendance: 200; Referee: López Abelleira

===== Group D =====
Pos	Team	Pld	W	D	L	GF	GA	GD	Pts	Qualification	AVI	LEA	CON
1	Avilés	4	2	1	1	4	2	+2	7	Qualification to semifinals	—	1–0	2–0
2	Lealtad	4	2	1	1	3	1	+2	7		1–0	—	2–0
3	Condal	4	0	2	2	1	5	−4	2		1–1	0–0	—

Source: Futbolasturiano.es
Rules for classification: 1) Points; 2) Head-to-head results; 3) Goal difference; 4) Number of goals scored

30 July 2016	Lealtad	2–0	Condal	Villaviciosa
19:00	Montoto 26'; David Grande 61' (pen.)	Report		Stadium: Les Caleyes; Attendance: 280; Referee: Fernández Martínez

3 August 2016	Condal	1–1	Avilés	Noreña
19:00	Iván Elena 70'	Report	Marcos Torres 64'	Stadium: Alejandro Ortea; Attendance: 180; Referee: Agudo Daza

7 August 2016	Avilés	1–0	Lealtad	Avilés
19:00	Álex García 9'	Report		Stadium: Román Suárez Puerta; Attendance: 150; Referee: García Riesgo

10 August 2016	Condal	0–0	Lealtad	Noreña
18:45		Report		Stadium: Alejandro Ortea; Attendance: 150; Referee: González Suárez

14 August 2016	Avilés	2–0	Condal	Avilés
	Dudi 15'; Luismi 29'	Report		Stadium: Román Suárez Puerta; Attendance: 250; Referee: Ladreda Mochales

17 August 2016	Lealtad	1–0	Avilés	Villaviciosa
18:45	Jandrín 61'	Report		Stadium: Les Caleyes; Attendance: 150; Referee: Quirós Pérez

==== Final bracket ====
Semi-finals
24 August and 7 September
Covadonga	0	0	0
Sporting Gijón B	3	3	6
25 August and 8 September
Langreo	0	1	1
Avilés	0	2	2

Final
12 October
Sporting Gijón B	3
Avilés	1

===== Semifinals =====
First leg

24 August 2016	Covadonga	0–3	Sporting Gijón B	Oviedo
20:15		Report	Álvaro 8', 69'; Aitor 62' (o.g.)	Stadium: Juan Antonio Álvarez Rabanal; Attendance: 300; Referee: Peláez Fernández

25 August 2016	Langreo	0–0	Avilés	La Felguera, Langreo
19:00		Report		Stadium: Ganzábal; Referee: López Abelleira

Second leg

7 September 2016	Sporting Gijón B	3–0 (6–0 agg.)	Covadonga	Gijón
17:45	Álvaro 43'; Rubén 56', 61'	Report		Stadium: Pepe Ortiz; Attendance: 180; Referee: Barbeira Juste

8 September 2016	Avilés	2–1 (2–1 agg.)	Langreo	Avilés
18:00	Nacho Méndez 53'; Marcos Torres 89'	Report	Omar 82'	Stadium: Román Suárez Puerta; Attendance: 600; Referee: Bermejo Ferreiro

===== Final =====
12 October 2016	Sporting Gijón B	3–1	Avilés	Oviedo
17:00	Jaime Santos 7'; Isma Cerra 14' (pen.); Pablo Fernández 49'	Report	Luismi 37'	Stadium: Juan Antonio Álvarez Rabanal; Attendance: 700

=== Balearic Islands tournament ===
First round
31 August and 7 September
Constància	1	1	2
Alcúdia	3	0	3
31 August and 7 September
Llosetense	0	0	0
Mallorca B	0	3	3

Semi-finals
14 and 21 September
Poblense	4	4	8
Alcúdia	1	1	2
14 and 21 September
Mallorca B	2	3	5
Peña Deportiva	0	1	1

Final
28 September and 5 October
Poblense	0	5	5
Mallorca B	1	2	3

==== First round ====
First leg

31 August 2016	Llosetense	0–0	Mallorca B	Lloseta
19:00		Report		Stadium: Municipal

31 August 2016	Constància	1–3	Alcúdia	Inca
19:30	N'Diaye 50'	Report	Alejandro Cabeza 36'; Bernat Rosselló 39'; Sergio Sanz 89'	Stadium: Municipal

Second leg

7 September 2016	Mallorca B	3–0 (3–0 agg.)	Llosetense	Palma
19:00	Enzo Lombardo 44', 87'; Stephen 64'	Report		Stadium: Son Bibiloni

7 September 2016	Alcúdia	0–1 (3–2 agg.)	Constància	Alcúdia
20:00		Report	Bartolomé Ramírez 32' (pen.)	Stadium: Els Arcs

==== Semifinals ====
First leg

14 September 2016	Mallorca B	2–0	Peña Deportiva	Palma
17:30	Alberto Fernández 50'; Ángel Sánchez 76'	Report		Stadium: Son Bibiloni

14 September 2016	Poblense	4–1	Alcúdia	Sa Pobla
19:00	Agustín Giaquinto 1', 68', 72'; Gregorio J. Socías 89'	Report	Sergio Perelló 7'	Stadium: Nou Camp

Second leg

21 September 2016	Peña Deportiva	1–3 (1–5 agg.)	Mallorca B	Santa Eulària
16:00	Luna 42'	Report	Enzo Lombardo 37'; Alberto Fernández 77'; Rodado 80'	Stadium: Municipal

21 September 2016	Alcúdia	1–4 (2–8 agg.)	Poblense	Alcúdia
20:00	Sergio Sanz 64'	Report	Giaquinto 25', 55'; Christopher 52'; Diego Martínez 84'	Stadium: Els Arcs

==== Final ====
First leg

28 September 2016	Poblense	0–1	Mallorca B	Sa Pobla
19:00		Report	Enzo Lombardo 70'	Stadium: Nou Camp

Second leg

5 October 2016	Mallorca B	2–5 (3–5 agg.)	Poblense	Palma
19:00	Cedric Omoigui 27'; Alberto Fernández 70'	Report	Aitor Pons 6'; Gabriel Gili 36', 76'; Lucas Gilardoni 63' (pen.); Agustín Giaquinto 87'	Stadium: Son Bibiloni

=== Basque Country tournament ===
Four teams of the Group 4 of Tercera División registered for this tournament. Semifinals were drawn on 5 September 2016 by Basque Football Federation.

Semi-finals
14 and 28 September
Zalla	1	1	2
Amurrio	1	0	1
14 and 28 September
Tolosa	3	1	4
Alavés B	2	3	5

Final
5 and 26 October
Zalla	0	2	2
Alavés B	2	6	8

==== Semi-finals ====
First leg

14 September 2016	Tolosa	3–2	Alavés B	Tolosa
19:00	Billy 12'; 45'; 88'		31'; 67'	Stadium: Berazubi

14 September 2016	Zalla	1–1	Amurrio	Zalla
20:00	Intxausti 42'	Report	Iker Erezkano 10' (pen.)	Stadium: Landaberri

Second leg

28 September 2016	Alavés B	3–1 (5–4 agg.)	Tolosa	Vitoria
19:00	Asier Benito 32'; Ibáñez 77'; De la Fuente 90+3'	Report	Arrieta 70'	Stadium: Ibaia

28 September 2016	Amurrio	0–1 (1–2 agg.)	Zalla	Zalla
20:00			Bernaola 88'	Stadium: Landaberri

==== Final ====
First leg

5 October 2016	Zalla	0–2	Alavés B	Zalla
20:00		Report	Lucas 10'; De la Fuente 36'	Stadium: Landaberri

Second leg

26 October 2016	Alavés B	6–2 (8–2 agg.)	Zalla	Vitoria
19:00				Stadium: Ibaia

=== Canary Islands tournament ===
Final
5 and 19 October
Tenisca	2	3	5
Las Zocas	0	2	2

==== Final ====
First leg

5 October 2016	Tenisca	2–0	Las Zocas	Santa Cruz de La Palma
16:30	Dani López 20', 54'	Report		Stadium: Virgen de las Nieves

Second leg

19 October 2016	Las Zocas	2–3 (2–5 agg.)	Tenisca	San Miguel de Abona
16:00	Héctor 33'; Josito 51'	Report	Piti 12'; Mahy 41'; Diego Cabezola 90+2' (pen.)	Stadium: Juanito Marrero

=== Cantabria tournament ===
The draw of the Cantabrian tournament was held on 1 July 2016 at the headquarters of the Cantabrian Football Federation. It was the third edition with the current format: a single-game knockout tournament between the eight best teams of Segunda División B and Tercera División that did not qualify to the Copa del Rey.

The winner received a prize of €3,000 and each team earned €500 per game played.

Quarter-finals
11 August
Gimnástica Torrelavega	3
Tropezón	1
12 August
Rayo Cantabria	2
Castro	1
13 August
Racing Santander B	2 (3)
Escobedo	2 (2)
13 August
Cayón	0
Vimenor	2

Semi-finals
15 August
Gimnástica Torrelavega	2 (1)
Rayo Cantabria	2 (3)
15 August
Racing Santander B	1
Vimenor	0

Final
14 September
Rayo Cantabria	0
Racing Santander B	1

==== Quarter-finals ====
11 August 2016	Gimnástica Torrelavega	3–1	Tropezón	Tanos, Torrelavega
20:00	Briz 60'; Jony 73'; Víctor 80'	Report	José Luis 84'	Stadium: Santa Ana; Referee: López Toca

12 August 2016	Rayo Cantabria	2–1	Castro	Tanos, Torrelavega
20:00	Domi 46'; Nata 54'	Report	Dani Calvo 33'	Stadium: Santa Ana; Referee: Álvarez Borbolla

13 August 2016	Racing Santander B	2–2 (3–2 p)	Escobedo	Tanos, Torrelavega
17:30	Manu Delgado 32'; Richi 90+2'	Report	Miguel Canales 45' (pen.), 83' (pen.)	Stadium: Santa Ana

13 August 2016	Cayón	0–2	Vimenor	Tanos, Torrelavega
20:00		Report	Gallo 81', 90+2' (pen.)	Stadium: Santa Ana

==== Semifinals ====
15 August 2016	Gimnástica Torrelavega	2–2 (1–3 p)	Rayo Cantabria	Tanos, Torrelavega
17:30	Óscar Briz 4'; Camus 89'	Report	Eric 37'; Nata 77'	Stadium: Santa Ana

15 August 2016	Racing Santander B	1–0	Vimenor	Tanos, Torrelavega
20:00	Cárcoba 90' (pen.)	Report		Stadium: Santa Ana

==== Final ====
14 September 2016	Rayo Cantabria	0–1	Racing Santander B	Santander
20:30		Report	Pablo Goñi 90+2'	Stadium: El Sardinero

=== Castile and León tournament ===
On 9 September 2016, the Castile-León Football Federation confirmed that three teams will join the tournament. They will play a round-robin group with one match at home and another away to determine the regional champion, who will play the National stage.

Pos	Team	Pld	W	D	L	GF	GA	GD	Pts	Qualification	ARA	AST	VIL
1	Arandina	2	2	0	0	8	1	+7	6	Champion	—	4–1	—
2	Atlético Astorga	2	1	0	1	4	6	−2	3		—	—	3–2
3	Villaralbo	2	0	0	2	2	7	−5	0		0–4	—	—

Rules for classification: 1) Points; 2) Goal difference; 3) Number of goals scored; 4) Head-to-head results; 5) Fair play

22 September 2016	Villaralbo	0–4	Arandina	Villaralbo
20:00		Report	Jefté 20', 24', 44'; Manquillo 46'	Stadium: José Fernández

29 September 2016	Arandina	4–1	Atlético Astorga	Aranda de Duero
20:15	Jefté 3', 7'; Charlie Took 63'; Arroyo 68'	Report	Peki 69'	Stadium: El Montecillo; Attendance: 200

5 October 2016	Atlético Astorga	3–2	Villaralbo	Astorga
20:00	Rojo 66'; Emilio 79'; Puntente 83'	Report	Magui 15'; Santi 48'	Stadium: La Eragudina

=== Castile-La Mancha tournament ===
The Copa Cervantes, reinstated by the Castile-La Mancha government, also acts as Copa RFEF qualifier for Castile-La Mancha teams. The draw was held in Toledo the 11 July 2016.

Albacete, Conquense, Socuéllamos and Toledo are ineligible to qualify to the national stage as regional champions, as they participate in the Copa del Rey.

First round
31 July and 6 August
Madridejos (a)	1	1	2
Talavera de la Reina	0	2	2
29 July and 6 August
Azuqueca	2	0	2
Guadalajara	1	0	1
31 July and 6 August
Almagro	2	0	2
Conquense (a)	2	0	2
31 July and 6 August
Quintanar del Rey (a)	0	3	3
Almansa	1	2	3

Quarter-finals
11 and 15 August
Madridejos	2	0	2
Toledo	0	0	0
10 and 14 August
Azuqueca	0	0	0
Socuéllamos	1	3	4
9 and 13 August
Conquense	0	1	1
La Roda	2	1	3
11 and 17 August
Quintanar del Rey	1	0	1
Albacete	1	2	3

Semi-Finals
13 and 28 September
Madridejos	1	2	3
Socuéllamos	2	0	2
29 September and 5 October
La Roda	0	1	1
Albacete	2	1	3

Final
26 October
Madridejos	0 (3)
Albacete	0 (4)

==== First round ====
First leg

29 July 2016	Azuqueca	2–1	Guadalajara	Azuqueca
20:00	Jorge Dolcet 12' (pen.); Adrián Carrasco 80'	Report	Óscar Muñoz 16'	Stadium: San Miguel

31 July 2016	Madridejos	1–0	Talavera de la Reina	Madridejos
20:00	Julen García 33'	Report		Stadium: Nuevo Estadio

31 July 2016	Quintanar del Rey	0–1	Almansa	Quintanar del Rey
20:00		Report	Pascual Sánchez 20'	Stadium: San Marcos

31 July 2016	Almagro	2–2	Conquense	Almagro
20:00	Rosendo Alarcón 'Chendo' 35', 42'	Report	Sergio de la Torre 24'; Javier Prada 30'	Stadium: Manuel Trujillo

Second leg

6 August 2016	Conquense	0–0 (2–2 agg.)	Almagro	Cuenca
19:00		Report		Stadium: Nueva Fuensanta

6 August 2016	Guadalajara	0–0 (1–2 agg.)	Azuqueca	Guadalajara
20:15	José Vega (penalty missed) 33'	Report		Stadium: Pedro Escartín

6 August 2016	Talavera de la Reina	2–1 (2–2 agg.)	Madridejos	Talavera de la Reina
20:30	David Murciego 69', 71' (pen.)	Report	Zebenzui Hernández 63'	Stadium: El Prado

6 August 2016	Almansa	2–3 (3–3 agg.)	Quintanar del Rey	Almansa
20:30	Carlos Villaescusa 67'; Francisco Tomás 76'	Report	Matías Saad 52'; Abderramin Aboud 80'; Amalio José Muñoz 88'	Stadium: Municipal Paco Simón

==== Quarter-finals ====
First leg

9 August 2016	Conquense	0–2	La Roda	Cuenca
19:00	Viky (penalty missed) 17'	Report	Diego Buitrago 3'; Antonio Megías 90'	Stadium: Nueva Fuensanta

10 August 2016	Azuqueca	0–1	Socuéllamos	Azuqueca
20:00		Report	Héctor Alonso 24'	Stadium: San Miguel

11 August 2016	Quintanar del Rey	1–1	Albacete	Quintanar del Rey
20:30	Cristian González 30'	Report	Aridane Santana 19'	Stadium: San Marcos

11 August 2016	Madridejos	2–0	Toledo	Madridejos
21:00	Zebenzui Hernández 36'; Javier Velázquez 76'	Report		Stadium: Nuevo Estadio

Second leg

13 August 2016	La Roda	1–1 (3–1 agg.)	Conquense	La Roda
21:00	Diego Buitrago 89'	Report	Álvaro Collado 34'; Javi Soria (penalty missed) 41'	Stadium: Municipal

14 August 2016	Socuéllamos	3–0 (4–0 agg.)	Azuqueca	Socuéllamos
20:00	Diego Sánchez 11'; Sergio Narváez 57'; Héctor Alonso 72'	Report		Stadium: Paquito Jiménez

15 August 2016	Toledo	0–0 (0–2 agg.)	Madridejos	Toledo
20:00		Report		Stadium: Anexo Salto del Caballo

17 August 2016	Albacete	2–0 (3–1 agg.)	Quintanar del Rey	Albacete
21:00	Dani Rodríguez 1'; Aridane 55'	Report		Stadium: Carlos Belmonte

==== Semi-finals ====
First leg

13 September 2016	Madridejos	1–2	Socuéllamos	Madridejos
20:00	Chema Lorente 45'	Report	Héctor Alonso 28'; Sergio Narváez 87'	Stadium: Nuevo Estadio

29 September 2016	La Roda	0–2	Albacete	La Roda
21:00		Report	Aketxe 70'; Eloy Gila 85'	Stadium: Municipal

Second leg

28 September 2016	Socuéllamos	0–2 (2–3 agg.)	Madridejos	Socuéllamos
20:30		Report	Gustavo 78'; Blai 84'	Stadium: Paquito Jiménez; Attendance: 300

5 October 2016	Albacete	1–1 (3–1 agg.)	La Roda	Albacete
19:00	Héctor Hernández 73'	Report	Pablo García 38'	Stadium: Ciudad Deportiva Andrés Iniesta

==== Final ====
26 October 2016	Madridejos	0–0 (3–4 p)	Albacete	La Roda
20:00				Stadium: Municipal

=== Catalonia tournament ===
The draw was held at the headquarters of the Catalan Football Federation on 24 August 2016.

Semi-final
7 and 21 September
Badalona	3	0	3
Vilafranca	0	2	2

Final
28 September and 19 October
Pobla de Mafumet	0	1	1
Badalona	2	2	4

==== Semi-final ====
First leg

7 September 2016	Badalona	3–0	Vilafranca	Badalona
18:00	Víctor García 2'; Rubén Canelada 30'; Sandro Toscano 54'	Report		Stadium: Montigalà

Second leg

21 September 2016	Vilafranca	2–0 (2–3 agg.)	Badalona	Vilafranca del Penedès
19:30	Oribe 15', 24'	Report		Stadium: Municipal

==== Final ====
First leg

28 September 2016	Pobla de Mafumet	0–2	Badalona	La Pobla de Mafumet
19:00		Report	Gerard Oliva 24'; Moha 38'	Stadium: Municipal

Second leg

19 October 2016	Badalona	2–1 (4–1 agg.)	Pobla de Mafumet	Badalona
17:00	Moha 15'; Víctor García 20'	Report	Dani Ojeda 43'	Stadium: Montigalà

=== Extremadura tournament ===
With a record of participants in the Regional competition, the games of the first round, drawn on 1 July 2016, will be played at the pitch of the worst qualified team in the 2015–16 season.

==== First round ====
Don Benito received a bye

30 July 2016	Fuente de Cantos	0–0 (5–3 p)	Díter Zafra	Fuente de Cantos
20:30				Stadium: Francisco de Zurbarán; Referee: Moruno Gala

30 July 2016	La Estrella	0–4	Jerez	Los Santos de Maimona
21:00			Monroy 5'; Marabé 27'; Juanpe 37'; Chema 60'	Stadium: Cipriano Tinoco; Referee: Bote González

31 July 2016	Santa Amalia	3–2	Valdivia	Santa Amalia
20:00				Stadium: Municipal; Referee: Sánchez Sánchez

31 July 2016	Amanecer	1–0	Arroyo	Sierra de Fuentes
20:00				Stadium: San Isidro; Referee: Rubio Álvarez

31 July 2016	Olivenza	0–1	Badajoz	Olivenza
20:45			Adri 30'	Stadium: Municipal; Referee: Olivera Vázquez

31 July 2016	Montijo	2–0	Atlético Pueblonuevo	Montijo
21:00	Coronado 30'			Stadium: Municipal; Referee: González Umbert

31 July 2016	Plasencia	2–2 (4–2 p)	Coria	Plasencia
21:00	Bugatto 45'; Luismi 93'		Alonso 12'; Álvaro 66'	Stadium: Ciudad Deportiva; Referee: Fuentes Pérez

31 July 2016	Extremadura San José	1–0	Calamonte	Almendralejo
21:00	David Cruz 24'			Stadium: Francisco de la Hera; Referee: Carretero González

31 July 2016	Moralo	0–2	Cacereño	Navalmoral de la Mata
21:30			Aarón 23'; Copete 46'	Stadium: Municipal; Referee: Garro Sánchez

==== Second round ====
The second round was drawn on 1 August 2016.

6 August 2016	Montijo	1–3	Badajoz	Montijo
20:30	33'		Joaqui 27'; Parada 58'; Joselu 66'	Stadium: Municipal

7 August 2016	Amanecer	2–2 (10–9 p)	Extremadura San José	Sierra de Fuentes
19:30				Stadium: San Isidro

7 August 2016	Santa Amalia	0–1	Don Benito	Don Benito
19:30			Pozo 35'	Stadium: Las Amapolas

7 August 2016	Fuente de Cantos	1–2	Jerez	Fuente de Cantos
20:00				Stadium: Francisco de Zurbarán

7 August 2016	Plasencia	0–1	Cacereño	Plasencia
21:00			Minaya 70' (pen.)	Stadium: Ciudad Deportiva

==== Third round ====
The third round was drawn on 8 August 2016. Jerez received a bye for the fourth round while the winner between Amanacer and Cacereño would qualify directly for the final.

14 August 2016	Amanecer	1–1 (3–5 p)	Cacereño	Sierra de Fuentes
19:15	Márquez 51'	Report	Martins 33'	Stadium: San Isidro

14 August 2016	Don Benito	2–2 (4–5 p)	Badajoz	Don Benito
21:00	Ruby (penalty missed) 35' (penalty missed) 36' 85'; Abraham Pozo 45'	Report	Gabri Ortega 29'; Álvaro Benítez 90+1'	Stadium: Vicente Sanz; Referee: Delfa Ramos

==== Semifinal ====
Cacereño received a bye to the final in the previous draw.

21 August 2016	Jerez	1–3	Badajoz	Jerez de los Caballeros
19:00	Chema Chávez 39' (pen.)	Report	José Ángel 22'; Joselu 23'; Gabri 45'	Stadium: Manuel Calzado Galván; Attendance: 600

==== Final ====
8 September 2016	Badajoz	5–0	Cacereño	Don Benito
20:00	Joselu 48'; Gabri 56'; José Ángel 60'; Ruano 67'; Paco Borrego 87'	Report		Stadium: Vicente Sanz; Attendance: 1,500; Referee: Moruno Gala

=== Galicia tournament ===
The draw was held at the headquarters of the Galician Football Federation on 5 August 2016. The matches will be played at home of team in lower division.

Round of 16
31 August
As Pontes	1 (4)
Compostela	1 (2)
31 August
Negreira	1 (3)
Arosa	1 (5)
7 September
Barbadás	1
Coruxo	0
31 August
Alondras	0
Pontevedra	3

Quarter-finals
14 September
As Pontes	1
Cerceda	3
14 September
Arosa	0 (5)
Bergantiños	0 (4)
15 September
Barbadás	2 (3)
Rápido de Bouzas	2 (4)
14 September
Ribadumia	1
Pontevedra	3

Semi-finals
28 September
Cerceda	1
Arosa	2
28 September
Rápido de Bouzas	2 (3)
Pontevedra	2 (5)

Final
12 October
Arosa	1
Pontevedra	0

==== Round of 16 ====
31 August 2016	As Pontes	1–1 (4–2 p)	Compostela	As Pontes
20:00	Cris 74' (pen.)	Report	Ube 15'	Stadium: O Poblado

31 August 2016	Alondras	0–3	Pontevedra	Cangas
20:00		Report	Jacobo Millán 19'; Mateo 22'; Barco 90'	Stadium: Morrazo; Attendance: 300

31 August 2016	Negreira	1–1 (3–5 p)	Arosa	Negreira
21:00	Mariño 42' (pen.)		Pablo Rivas 60'	Stadium: Jesús García Calvo

7 September 2016	Barbadás	1–0	Coruxo	Barbadás
20:45	Igor 16'	Report		Stadium: Os Carrís; Attendance: 400

==== Quarter-finals ====
14 September 2016	As Pontes	1–3	Cerceda	As Pontes
20:00	Criado 74'	Report	Carlos 10'; Cañizares 41'; Álex Ares 68'	Stadium: O Poblado; Attendance: 100

14 September 2016	Arosa	0–0 (5–4 p)	Bergantiños	Vilagarcía de Arousa
20:00		Report		Stadium: A Lomba

14 September 2016	Ribadumia	1–3	Pontevedra	Ribadumia
21:00	Changui (penalty missed) 35'; Agus 90+2'	Report	Mouriño 33'; Mateu Ferrer 45'; Álex González 71'	Stadium: A Senra; Attendance: 200

15 September 2016	Barbadás	2–2 (3–4 p)	Rápido de Bouzas	Barbadás
20:45	Igor Sevivas 86' (pen.); Oli 90+3'	Report	Martín Barreiro 21'; Raúl Espinosa 61'	Stadium: Os Carrís

==== Semi-finals ====
28 September 2016	Cerceda	1–2	Arosa	Cerceda
20:00	Juan 87'	Report	Carlos Torrado 19'; Alberto Carballa 47'	Stadium: O Roxo; Attendance: 100

28 September 2016	Rápido de Bouzas	2–2 (3–5 p)	Pontevedra	Bouzas, Vigo
20:45	Raúl 69', 78'	Report	Javi Bonilla 49' (pen.); Mario Barco 79'	Stadium: Baltasar Pujales; Attendance: 75

==== Final ====
12 October 2016	Arosa	1–0	Pontevedra	Cambados
17:30	Julio Rey 46'	Report		Stadium: Burgáns; Attendance: 1.000

=== La Rioja tournament ===
The draw was held at the headquarters of the Regional Federation on 20 July 2016.

Quarter-finals
14 August
Calasancio	0
Varea	3
13 August
SD Logroñés	3
Agoncillo	1
13 August
Haro	4
Anguiano	0
14 August
Atlético Vianés	1 (4)
Náxara	1 (5)

Semi-finals
31 August
Varea	1
SD Logroñés	0
31 August
Haro	1
Náxara	0

Final
12 October
Varea	1
Haro	0

==== Quarter-finals ====
13 August 2016	SD Logroñés	3–1	Agoncillo	Logroño
18:30	Moisés 24', 32'; Navajas 86'	Report	Eduardo 80' (pen.)	Stadium: El Salvador de Valdegastea; Attendance: 400

13 August 2016	Haro	4–0	Anguiano	Haro
18:30	Adriano Gil 20'; Leonardo López 36'; Iker Urquiza 73'; Asier Camino 81'			Stadium: El Mazo

14 August 2016	Calasancio	0–3	Varea	Logroño
18:00			Adrián Pinilla 7'; Rubén Pérez 77', 87'	Stadium: La Estrella

14 August 2016	Atlético Vianés	1–1 (4–5 p)	Náxara	Viana
19:00	Pablo Torres 34' (pen.)		Miguel Martínez 27'	Stadium: Príncipe de Viana

==== Semifinals ====
31 August 2016	Varea	1–0	SD Logroñés	Logroño
19:30	Rubén 15'	Report		Stadium: Municipal Varea; Attendance: 300

31 August 2016	Haro	1–0	Náxara	Haro
20:15	Urkiza 6'	Report		Stadium: El Mazo

==== Final ====
12 October 2016	Varea	1–0	Haro	Logroño
17:30	Rubén Pérez 11'	Report		Stadium: Mundial 82

=== Madrid tournament ===
On 16 August 2016, the Madrid Football Federation confirmed that only four teams will join the tournament. They played a round-robin group to determine the regional champion.

Pos	Team	Pld	W	D	L	GF	GA	GD	Pts	Qualification	FUE	ALC	INT	ARA
1	Fuenlabrada	6	4	2	0	10	3	+7	14	Champion	—	1–1	1–0	3–0
2	Alcobendas Sport	6	2	3	1	10	6	+4	9		0–2	—	2–2	2–0
3	Internacional	6	2	2	2	9	7	+2	8		0–1	1–1	—	3–2
4	Aravaca	6	0	1	5	4	17	−13	1		2–2	0–4	0–3	—

Updated to match(es) played on 26 October 2016. Source:
Rules for classification: 1) Points; 2) Head-to-head results; 3) Goal difference; 4) Number of goals scored

7 September 2016	Alcobendas Sport	2–0	Aravaca	Alcobendas
20:00	Javi Medina 44'; Víctor Merchán 83' (pen.)			Stadium: Polideportivo José Caballero

7 September 2016	Internacional	0–1	Fuenlabrada	Boadilla del Monte
20:30		Report	Cristóbal 42'; Guaje (penalty missed) 62'	Stadium: Polideportivo Municipal

14 September 2016	Fuenlabrada	3–0	Aravaca	Fuenlabrada
20:00	Molinero 39'; Carlos Guaje 49'; Pipa 89'	Report		Stadium: Fernando Torres

14 September 2016	Alcobendas Sport	2–2	Internacional	Alcobendas
20:00	Joao Pereira 43'; Moisés García 79'	Report	Dani García 71'; Alberto Malagón 90'	Stadium: Polideportivo José Caballero

21 September 2016	Fuenlabrada	1–1	Alcobendas Sport	Fuenlabrada
20:00	Molinero 2'	Report	Quique Vázquez 30'	Stadium: Fernando Torres

21 September 2016	Internacional	3–2	Aravaca	Boadilla del Monte
21:30	Álvaro Zamora 39'; Daniel García 56'; Adrián Pérez 70'		David Esteban 78'; David Trujillo 89'	Stadium: Polideportivo Municipal

5 October 2016	Fuenlabrada	1–0	Internacional	Fuenlabrada
20:00	Cervero 76' (pen.)	Report		Stadium: Fernando Torres

5 October 2016	Aravaca	0–4	Alcobendas Sport	Aravaca, Madrid
21:00			Adrián Pemau 29'; Víctor Merchán 55', 85'; Sergio Parla 75' (pen.)	Stadium: Antonio Sanfiz

12 October 2016	Aravaca	2–2	Fuenlabrada	Aravaca, Madrid
12:00	Ignacio Mayorga 21'; Ignacio González 56'		Diego Cervero 16', 64'	Stadium: Antonio Sanfiz

12 October 2016	Internacional	1–1	Alcobendas Sport	Boadilla del Monte
17:00	Adrián Pérez 84'		Óscar Martín 41'	Stadium: Polideportivo Municipal

26 October 2016	Alcobendas Sport	0–2	Fuenlabrada	Alcobendas
20:00		Report	Christian Jiménez 20'; Carlos Álvarez 73'	Stadium: Polideportivo José Caballero

26 October 2016	Aravaca	0–3 (f)	Internacional	Aravaca, Madrid
				Stadium: Antonio Sanfiz

=== Murcia tournament ===
The draw was held at the headquarters of the Region of Murcia Football Federation on 25 August 2016.

Quarter-finals
7 September
Olímpico Totana	1
Águilas	0
7 September
UCAM Murcia B	1
Ciudad de Murcia	0
7 September
Churra	3
Mar Menor	0
7 September
Nueva Vanguardia	2
Murcia Imperial	0

Semi-finals
14 September
Olímpico Totana	1
UCAM Murcia B	4
14 September
Churra	1
Nueva Vanguardia	2

Final
28 September
UCAM Murcia B	3
Nueva Vanguardia	0

==== Quarter-finals ====
7 September 2016	UCAM Murcia B	1–0	Ciudad de Murcia	Sangonera la Verde
18:00	Diego Fuster 21'			Stadium: El Mayayo

7 September 2016	Nueva Vanguardia	2–0	Murcia Imperial	Alcantarilla
20:00	Ismael 56'; Meroño 85'			Stadium: Ángel Sornichero

7 September 2016	Olímpico Totana	1–0	Águilas	Totana
20:30	Monjas 84'			Stadium: Juan Cayuela

7 September 2016	Churra	3–0	Mar Menor	Murcia
21:00	Carrasco 42'; Valdeolivas 54' (o.g.); Pablo 87'			Stadium: Municipal de Churra

==== Semi-finals ====
14 September 2016	Churra	1–2	Nueva Vanguardia	Murcia
21:00				Stadium: Municipal de Churra

15 September 2016	Olímpico Totana	1–4	UCAM Murcia B	Totana
20:30	Dani Morales 3'	Report	Edu Luna 23' (pen.); Salinas 33'; Jorge 62'; Pipo 90' (pen.)	Stadium: Juan Cayuela

==== Final ====
28 September 2016	UCAM Murcia B	3–0	Nueva Vanguardia	Murcia
20:30	Pipo 1'; Salinas 18'; Isi 77'	Report		Stadium: Campus Universitario de Espinardo; Attendance: 300

=== Navarre tournament ===
==== Qualifying tournament ====
===== Group A =====
Pos	Team	Pld	W	D	L	GF	GA	GD	Pts	Qualification	IRU	EGU	COR	BUR
1	Iruña	3	2	1	0	5	0	+5	7	Qualification to semifinals	—	—	—	0–0
2	Valle de Egüés	3	1	1	1	5	7	−2	4	Qualification to semifinals	0–4	—	3–1	—
3	Cortes	3	1	0	2	3	4	−1	3		0–1	—	—	2–0
4	Burladés	3	0	2	1	2	4	−2	2		—	2–2	—	—

Updated to match(es) played on 10 August 2016. Source: Futbolme
Rules for classification: 1) Points; 2) Head-to-head results; 3) Goal difference; 4) Number of goals scored

10 August 2016	Iruña	0–0	Burladés	Pamplona
19:30				Stadium: Tajonar

10 August 2016	Valle de Egüés	3–1	Cortes	Valle de Egüés
20:00				Stadium: Sarriguren

24 August 2016	Cortes	2–0	Burladés	Cortes
19:00				Stadium: San Francisco Javier

24 August 2016	Valle de Egüés	0–4	Iruña	Valle de Egüés
20:00				Stadium: Sarriguren

31 August 2016	Cortes	0–1	Iruña	Cortes
19:00				Stadium: San Francisco Javier

31 August 2016	Burladés	2–2	Valle de Egüés	Burlada
20:00				Stadium: Ripagaina

===== Group B =====
Pos	Team	Pld	W	D	L	GF	GA	GD	Pts	Qualification	PSP	HUA	SJU	VTI
1	Peña Sport	3	2	1	0	6	0	+6	7	Qualification to semifinals	—	3–0	—	3–0
2	Itaroa Huarte	3	2	0	1	5	6	−1	6	Qualification to semifinals	—	—	2–1	—
3	San Juan	3	1	1	1	4	3	+1	4		0–0	—	—	3–1
4	Valtierrano	3	0	0	3	3	9	−6	0		—	2–3	—	—

First match(es) will be played: 10 August 2016. Source: Futbolme
Rules for classification: 1) Points; 2) Head-to-head results; 3) Goal difference; 4) Number of goals scored

9 August 2016	Valtierrano	2–3	Itaroa Huarte	Valtierra
19:30				Stadium: Valtierra

10 August 2016	San Juan	0–0	Peña Sport	Pamplona
20:30				Stadium: San Juan

24 August 2016	Peña Sport	3–0	Itaroa Huarte	Tafalla
18:30	Cristian Giles 49'; Toni 56'; Xabi Calvo 74'	Report		Stadium: San Francisco

24 August 2016	San Juan	3–1	Valtierrano	Pamplona
20:30				Stadium: San Juan

31 August 2016	Peña Sport	3–0	Valtierrano	Tafalla
18:30	Cristian Giles 50'; Jonathan Serrano 65'; Mario Ganuza 69'			Stadium: San Francisco

31 August 2016	Itaroa Huarte	2–1	San Juan	Huarte
20:00	Javier Sanz 78'; Ander Elcano 88'		Zabaleta 34'	Stadium: Areta

==== Final bracket ====
Semi-finals
7 September
Iruña	2
Itaroa Huarte	0
7 September
Peña Sport	3
Valle de Egüés	0

Final
14 September
Iruña	0
Peña Sport	1

===== Semifinals =====
7 September 2016	Peña Sport	3–0	Valle de Egüés	Tafalla
18:30	Cristian Giles 45', 86'; Diego Martón 90'	Report		Stadium: San Francisco

7 September 2016	Iruña	2–0	Itaroa Huarte	Pamplona
20:00	Diego Rubio (pen.); Vicuña			Stadium: Tajonar

===== Final =====
14 September 2016	Iruña	0–1	Peña Sport	Pamplona
20:00		Report	Maeztu 78'	Stadium: Tajonar

=== Valencian Community tournament ===
Castellón, Orihuela and Torre Levante played the tournament, consisting in 3 matches of 60 minutes each (2 halves of 30 minutes) in a neutral venue.

Pos	Team	Pld	W	D	L	GF	GA	GD	Pts	Qualification	ORI	TLE	CAS
1	Orihuela	2	2	0	0	3	0	+3	6	Champion	—	1–0	—
2	Torre Levante	2	1	0	1	1	1	0	3		—	—	1–0
3	Castellón	2	0	0	2	0	3	−3	0		0–2	—	—

5 October 2016	Castellón	0–2	Orihuela	Alzira
18:00		Report	Raúl 9'; Siro López 35'	Stadium: Luis Suñer

5 October 2016	Torre Levante	1–0	Castellón	Alzira
19:30	Chus 46'	Report		Stadium: Luis Suñer

5 October 2016	Orihuela	1–0	Torre Levante	Alzira
21:00	Dani Abellán 38'	Report		Stadium: Luis Suñer

== National tournament ==
The national tournament began 23 November 2016.

=== Qualified teams ===
Defending champion

(Balearic Islands) Atlético Baleares (3)

Teams losing Copa del Rey first round

(Aragon) Andorra (4)
(Andalusia) Atlético Mancha Real (3)
(Valencian Community) Atlético Saguntino (3)
(Galicia (Spain)) ~~Boiro (3)~~
(Castile and León) Burgos (3)
(Castilla–La Mancha) Conquense (4)
(Cantabria) ~~Laredo (4)~~
(Region of Murcia) Lorca Deportiva (4)
(Region of Murcia) ~~Murcia (3)~~
(Castile and León) Ponferradina (3)
(Catalonia) Prat (3)
(Basque Country (autonomous community)) Real Unión (3)
(Community of Madrid) San Sebastián de los Reyes (3)
(Castilla–La Mancha) Socuéllamos (3)
(La Rioja) ~~UD Logroñés (3)~~
(Canary Islands) ~~Villa de Santa Brígida (4)~~
(Castile and León) Zamora (4)
(Basque Country (autonomous community)) Zamudio (3)

Winners of Autonomous Communities tournaments

(Basque Country (autonomous community)) Alavés B (4)
(Castile and León) Arandina (3)
(Galicia (Spain)) Arosa (4)
(Extremadura) Badajoz (4)
(Catalonia) Badalona (3)
(Community of Madrid) Fuenlabrada (3)
(Andalusia) Linares (3)
(Castilla–La Mancha) Madridejos (4)
(Valencian Community) Orihuela (4)
(Navarre) Peña Sport (4)
(Balearic Islands) Poblense (4)
(Cantabria) Racing Santander B (4)
(Andalusia) San Fernando (3)
(Asturias) Sporting Gijón B (4)
(Canary Islands) Tenisca (4)
(Aragon) Teruel (4)
(Region of Murcia) UCAM Murcia B (4)
(La Rioja) Varea (4)

- (3) Team playing in 2016–17 Segunda División B (third tier)
- (4) Team playing in 2016–17 Tercera División (fourth tier)
- Slashed teams withdrew from the competition.

=== Round of 32 ===
The draw for the first round was held on October 28. The matches were played between 23 November and 15 December 2016.

Team 1	Agg.	Team 2	1st leg	2nd leg
Sporting Gijón B (4) (Asturias)	3–0	(Castile and León) Zamora (4)	2–0	1–0
Arosa (4) (Galicia (Spain))	1–9	(Castile and León) Ponferradina (3)	1–5	0–4
Zamudio (3) (Basque Country (autonomous community))	3–2	(Cantabria) Racing Santander B (4)	1–1	2–1
Burgos (3) (Castile and León)	3–2	(Castile and León) Arandina (3)	2–1	1–1
Peña Sport (4) (Navarre)	0–1	(Basque Country (autonomous community)) Real Unión (3)	0–1	0–0
Varea (4) (La Rioja)	1–5	(Basque Country (autonomous community)) Alavés B (4)	1–3	0–2
Poblense (4) (Balearic Islands)	3–3 (a)	(Catalonia) Badalona (3)	2–2	1–1
Atlético Baleares (3) (Balearic Islands)	2–5	(Catalonia) Prat (3)	0–1	2–4
Orihuela (4) (Valencian Community)	1–3	(Region of Murcia) Lorca Deportiva (4)	1–1	0–2
Atlético Saguntino (3) (Valencian Community)	3–0	(Region of Murcia) UCAM Murcia B (4)	2–0	1–0
Fuenlabrada (3) (Community of Madrid)	2–2 (a)	(Community of Madrid) San Sebastián de los Reyes (3)	1–0	1–2
Tenisca (4) (Canary Islands)	7–3	(Castilla–La Mancha) Madridejos (4)	7–1	0–2
San Fernando (3) (Andalusia)	1–2	(Andalusia) Linares (3)	0–1	1–1
Atlético Mancha Real (3) (Andalusia)	1–6	(Extremadura) Badajoz (4)	1–2	0–4
Andorra (4) (Aragon)	2–12	(Castilla–La Mancha) Socuéllamos (3)	0–4	2–8
Conquense (4) (Castilla–La Mancha)	1–3	(Aragon) Teruel (4)	1–2	0–1

==== First leg ====
23 November 2016	Orihuela	1–1	Lorca Deportiva	Redován
20:00	Siro 17'	Report	Víctor 70'	Stadium: Antonio Pascual Gil; Attendance: 300

30 November 2016	Sporting Gijón B	2–0	Zamora	Gijón
15:45	Luismi 47'; Bertín 90'	Report		Stadium: Pepe Ortiz; Attendance: 200; Referee: Bermejo Ferrero

30 November 2016	Atlético Baleares	0–1	Prat	Palma
17:00		Report	Fran Piera 3'	Stadium: Son Malferit; Attendance: 400; Referee: Víctor Jiménez

30 November 2016	Poblense	2–2	Badalona	Sa Pobla
18:30	Aitor Pons 15'; Agus 50'	Report	Sergio Maestre 27'; Musa 45'	Stadium: Nou Camp; Referee: Escribano Jiménez

30 November 2016	Zamudio	1–1	Racing Santander B	Zamudio
19:30	Galdós 90'	Report	Pau 79'	Stadium: Gazituaga; Referee: Etayo Herrera

30 November 2016	Peña Sport	0–1	Real Unión	Tafalla
19:30		Report	Arriaga 37'	Stadium: San Francisco

30 November 2016	Andorra	0–4	Socuéllamos	Andorra
19:30		Report	Javillo 29'; Salva 44'; Narváez 55' (pen.); Dieguito 89'	Stadium: Juan Antonio Endeiza; Attendance: 100; Referee: Mateo Montañés

30 November 2016	Varea	1–3	Alavés B	Logroño
20:00	Chimbo 16'		Andrei 69'; De la Fuente 76' (pen.); Jaime 86'	Stadium: Municipal

30 November 2016	Fuenlabrada	1–0	San Sebastián de los Reyes	Fuenlabrada
20:00	Nana 23'	Report		Stadium: Fernando Torres

30 November 2016	Atlético Mancha Real	1–2	Badajoz	Mancha Real
20:00	Elady 89' (pen.)	Report	Jaume 15', 60'	Stadium: La Juventud; Attendance: 400; Referee: Muñoz González

30 November 2016	Conquense	1–2	Teruel	Cuenca
20:00	Vicky 12' (pen.)	Report	Néstor Lafuente 34'; Durán 43'	Stadium: La Beneficencia

30 November 2016	Arosa	1–5	Ponferradina	Vilagarcía de Arousa
20:15	Aitor Díaz 48'	Report	Juanto Ortuño 12', 20', 28'; Caiado 35'; Figueroa 83'	Stadium: A Lomba; Referee: Martínez Barral

30 November 2016	Burgos	2–1	Arandina	Burgos
20:30	Montero 60'; Fito Miranda 76'	Report	Arroyo 33' (pen.)	Stadium: El Plantío; Referee: Calleja Castrillo

30 November 2016	Tenisca	7–1	Madridejos	Santa Cruz de La Palma
20:30	Chema González 26'; Jordan Martín 30'; Piti 49'; Cristian 53', 64'; Camacho 58'; Omar 82'	Report	Alexis 14'	Stadium: Virgen de las Nieves

1 December 2016	Atlético Saguntino	2–0	UCAM Murcia B	Sagunto
19:30	Kike Ferreres 75'; Néstor 83'	Report		Stadium: Morvedre; Referee: Francesc Bañó

1 December 2016	San Fernando	0–1	Linares	San Fernando
20:00		Report	Álvaro Vega 81'	Stadium: Bahía Sur; Attendance: 300; Referee: De los Santos Mellado

==== Second leg ====
6 December 2016	Arandina	1–1 (2–3 agg.)	Burgos	Aranda de Duero
17:30	Leo Rodríguez 42'	Report	Montero 27'	Stadium: El Montecillo; Attendance: 700; Referee: Mazo Maruri

8 December 2016	Real Unión	0–0 (1–0 agg.)	Peña Sport	Irun
12:00		Report		Stadium: Stadium Gal; Referee: Cuesta Azcano

13 December 2016	Alavés B	2–0 (5–1 agg.)	Varea	Vitoria-Gasteiz
19:00	Miguel 77'; Fajardo 84'			Stadium: Ibaia

14 December 2016	Badalona	1–1 (3–3 agg.)	Poblense	Badalona
15:30	Musa 88'	Report	Gili 64'	Stadium: Montigalà

14 December 2016	UCAM Murcia B	0–1 (0–3 agg.)	Atlético Saguntino	Sangonera la Verde
16:00		Report	Meseguer 42'	Stadium: El Mayayo

14 December 2016	Prat	4–2 (5–2 agg.)	Atlético Baleares	El Prat de Llobregat
17:00	Padilla 23', 65'; Aitor Lario 29'; Forgàs 63'	Report	Avi 8'; Marcel 15'	Stadium: Sagnier

14 December 2016	Racing Santander B	1–2 (2–3 agg.)	Zamudio	Santander
20:00	Mario Soberón 13'	Report	Imaz 22'; Luariz 88'	Stadium: El Sardinero; Attendance: 500; Referee: Sáiz Pérez

14 December 2016	San Sebastián de los Reyes	2–1 (2–2 agg.)	Fuenlabrada	San Sebastián de los Reyes
20:00	Matas 32'; Javi Navas 60'	Report	Cervero 82' (pen.)	Stadium: Nuevo Matapiñoneras

14 December 2016	Badajoz	4–0 (6–1 agg.)	Atlético Mancha Real	Badajoz
20:00	Joselu 4'; Parada 16', 46'; Adri 74' (pen.)	Report		Stadium: Nuevo Vivero

14 December 2016	Socuéllamos	8–2 (12–2 agg.)	Andorra	Socuéllamos
20:00	Álvaro Fernández 28'; Garmendia 37', 52'; Dieguito 57', 69', 84'; Narváez 62', 64'	Report	Ginés 45' (pen.); Víctor 59'	Stadium: Paquito Jiménez; Referee: Marchante Flores

14 December 2016	Teruel	1–0 (3–1 agg.)	Conquense	Teruel
20:00	Tomi (o.g.) 86'	Report		Stadium: Pinilla

14 December 2016	Ponferradina	4–0 (9–1 agg.)	Arosa	Ponferrada
20:15	Figueroa 5', 8', 55'; Marcos 20' (o.g.)	Report		Stadium: El Toralín

14 December 2016	Zamora	0–1 (0–3 agg.)	Sporting Gijón B	Zamora
20:30		Report	Álvaro 31'	Stadium: Ruta de la Plata

14 December 2016	Madridejos	2–0 (3–7 agg.)	Tenisca	Madridejos
20:30	Blai Pons 14'; Acuña 61'			Stadium: Nuevo Estadio

14 December 2016	Lorca Deportiva	2–0 (3–1 agg.)	Orihuela	Lorca
20:45	Kuki 23'; Cristo Díaz 56'	Report		Stadium: Francisco Artés Carrasco

15 December 2016	Linares	1–1 (2–1 agg.)	San Fernando	Linares
20:45	Gámiz 68'	Report	Édgar 78'	Stadium: Linarejos

=== Round of 16 ===
The draw for the Round of 16 was held on 16 December 2016. The matches were played between 11 and 25 January 2017.

Team 1	Agg.	Team 2	1st leg	2nd leg
Zamudio (3) (Basque Country (autonomous community))	0–5	(Asturias) Sporting Gijón B (4)	0–2	0–3
Real Unión (3) (Basque Country (autonomous community))	5–2	(Basque Country (autonomous community)) Alavés B (4)	3–2	2–0
Fuenlabrada (3) (Community of Madrid)	2–1	(Castile and León) Burgos (3)	1–1	1–0
Ponferradina (3) (Castile and León)	3–2	(Canary Islands) Tenisca (4)	2–2	1–0
Badalona (3) (Catalonia)	6–3	(Aragon) Teruel (4)	3–0	3–3
Prat (3) (Catalonia)	1–2	(Valencian Community) Atlético Saguntino (3)	1–1	0–1
Badajoz (4) (Extremadura)	0–4	(Region of Murcia) Lorca Deportiva (4)	0–0	0–4
Linares (3) (Andalusia)	2–4	(Castilla–La Mancha) Socuéllamos (3)	1–2	1–2

==== First leg ====
11 January 2017	Badalona	3–0	Teruel	Badalona
16:00	Robusté 2', 52'; Gerard 84'	Report		Stadium: Montigalà

11 January 2017	Prat	1–1	Atlético Saguntino	El Prat de Llobregat
18:45	Javi Lara 71'	Report	Ricarte 9' (o.g.)	Stadium: Sagnier

11 January 2017	Real Unión	3–2	Alavés B	Irun
19:00	Esnaola 36'; Capelete 40'; Jorge Galán 80' (pen.)	Report	Dani Iglesias 69'; Einar 75'	Stadium: Stadium Gal

11 January 2017	Zamudio	0–2	Sporting Gijón B	Zamudio
19:30		Report	Claudio 53'; Pablo Fernández 77'	Stadium: Gazituaga; Attendance: 100

11 January 2017	Fuenlabrada	1–1	Burgos	Fuenlabrada
20:00	Borja Sánchez 4'	Report	Xabi Etxarri 88'	Stadium: Fernando Torres; Attendance: 500

11 January 2017	Badajoz	0–0	Lorca Deportiva	Badajoz
20:00		Report		Stadium: Nuevo Vivero; Attendance: 200

11 January 2017	Ponferradina	2–2	Tenisca	Ponferrada
20:15	Figueroa 4'; Núñez 14'	Report	Dani López 74', 81'	Stadium: El Toralín

11 January 2017	Linares	1–2	Socuéllamos	Linares
20:45	Pekes 38'	Report	Álex Cortell 9'; Sergio Narváez 64'	Stadium: Linarejos; Attendance: 450

==== Second leg ====
18 January 2017	Alavés B	0–2 (2–5 agg.)	Real Unión	Vitoria-Gasteiz
16:30			Arriaga 39'; Jorge Galán 90+3'	Stadium: José Luis Compañón

18 January 2017	Atlético Saguntino	1–0 (2–1 agg.)	Prat	Sagunto
18:45	Marín 62'			Stadium: Morvedre

18 January 2017	Teruel	3–3 (3–6 agg.)	Badalona	Teruel
20:00	Juanma 29' (pen.), 74'; Alberto 77'		Iván Guzmán 35'; Agus Alonso 36', 67'	Stadium: Pinilla

18 January 2017	Socuéllamos	2–1 (4–2 agg.)	Linares	Socuéllamos
20:00	Álex Cortell 23'; Dieguito 35'		Jacinto 78' (pen.)	Stadium: Paquito Jiménez

18 January 2017	Burgos	0–1 (1–2 agg.)	Fuenlabrada	Burgos
20:30			Velasco 89'	Stadium: El Plantío

18 January 2017	Tenisca	0–1 (2–3 agg.)	Ponferradina	Santa Cruz de La Palma
21:30			Gonzalo 36'	Stadium: Virgen de las Nieves

19 January 2017	Sporting Gijón B	3–0 (5–0 agg.)	Zamudio	Gijón
15:30	Pablo Fernández 32'; Ismael 79'; Claudio 88'			Stadium: Pepe Ortiz

25 January 2017	Lorca Deportiva	4–0 (4–0 agg.)	Badajoz	Lorca
20:30	Wilson Cuero 11', 59'; Carrasco 33'; Iván Pérez 56'			Stadium: Francisco Artés Carrasco
Note: Match postponed from 18 January due to heavy snow.

=== Quarterfinals ===
The draw for the quarterfinals was held on 20 January 2017.

Team 1	Agg.	Team 2	1st leg	2nd leg
Sporting Gijón B (4) (Asturias)	2–6	(Catalonia) Badalona (3)	2–1	0–5
Ponferradina (3) (Castile and León)	0–2	(Basque Country (autonomous community)) Real Unión (3)	0–0	0–2
Atlético Saguntino (3) (Valencian Community)	4–0	(Castilla–La Mancha) Socuéllamos (3)	4–0	0–0
Fuenlabrada (3) (Community of Madrid)	4–4 (a)	(Region of Murcia) Lorca Deportiva (4)	1–0	3–4

==== First leg ====
1 February 2017	Sporting Gijón B	2–1	Badalona	Gijón
16:15	Isma Cerro 11'; Claudio 55'	Report	Grimà 88'	Stadium: Pepe Ortiz

1 February 2017	Atlético Saguntino	4–0	Socuéllamos	Sagunto
19:00	Arturo 38'; Javi Boix 59'; Fran Gámez 68'; Néstor 73'	Report		Stadium: Morvedre

1 February 2017	Fuenlabrada	1–0	Lorca Deportiva	Fuenlabrada
20:00	Abel 89'	Report		Stadium: Fernando Torres

1 February 2017	Ponferradina	0–0	Real Unión	Ponferrada
20:15		Report		Stadium: El Toralín

==== Second leg ====
8 February 2017	Badalona	5–0 (6–2 agg.)	Sporting Gijón B	Badalona
16:30	Bruno 20'; Oliva 27', 55'; Carlos Calvo 45+2' (pen.); Iván Agudo 57'			Stadium: Municipal

8 February 2017	Real Unión	2–0 (2–0 agg.)	Ponferradina	Irun
19:00				Stadium: Stadium Gal

8 February 2017	Socuéllamos	0–0 (0–4 agg.)	Atlético Saguntino	Socuéllamos
20:00				Stadium: Paquito Jiménez

8 February 2017	Lorca Deportiva	4–3 (4–4 agg.)	Fuenlabrada	Lorca
20:30	Sergio Rodríguez 39'; Cañadas 61', 90+5'; Carrasco 86'		Carrasco 53' (o.g.); Dioni 88', 90+3'	Stadium: Francisco Artés Carrasco

=== Semifinals ===
The draw for the semifinals was held on 10 February 2017.

Team 1	Agg.	Team 2	1st leg	2nd leg
Badalona (3) (Catalonia)	2–2 (a)	(Community of Madrid) Fuenlabrada (3)	1–2	1–0
Real Unión (3) (Basque Country (autonomous community))	0–1	(Valencian Community) Atlético Saguntino (3)	0–0	0–1

==== First leg ====
22 February 2017	Badalona	1–2	Fuenlabrada	Badalona
17:00	Sergi 27'	Report	Velasco 35'; Cristóbal 52'	Stadium: Municipal; Referee: Ferrero Mansilla

22 February 2017	Real Unión	0–0	Atlético Saguntino	Irun
19:00		Report		Stadium: Stadium Gal; Referee: Gómez Luque

==== Second leg ====
2 March 2017	Fuenlabrada	0–1 (2–2 agg.)	Badalona	Fuenlabrada
17:00		Report	Moha 70'	Stadium: Fernando Torres; Attendance: 2.000; Referee: Vázquez González

2 March 2017	Atlético Saguntino	1–0 (1–0 agg.)	Real Unión	Sagunto
19:00	Benito 12'	Report		Stadium: Morvedre

=== Final ===
Team 1	Agg.	Team 2	1st leg	2nd leg
Fuenlabrada (3) (Community of Madrid)	0–3	(Valencian Community) Atlético Saguntino (3)	0–0	0–3

==== First leg ====
30 March 2017	Fuenlabrada	0–0	Atlético Saguntino	Fuenlabrada
19:15		Report		Stadium: Fernando Torres; Attendance: 2,250; Referee: Patiño Álvarez

==== Second leg ====
6 April 2017	Atlético Saguntino	3–0 (3–0 agg.)	Fuenlabrada	Sagunto
19:15	Óscar López 18'; Gámez 38'; Néstor 90+3'	Report		Stadium: Morvedre; Attendance: 2,100; Referee: García Gallegos
