= 2022 Tercera División RFEF play-offs =

Spanish football league play-offs

The 2022 Tercera División RFEF play-offs to Segunda División RFEF from Tercera División RFEF (promotion play-offs) will be the final play-offs for the promotion from 2021–22 Tercera División RFEF to 2022–23 Segunda División RFEF.

== Format ==
Group champions will be promoted directly to the Segunda RFEF. Due to the remodeling of the RFEF leagues, as of this season the promotion play-off is divided into two stages: regional and national. Four teams from each group participate in the regional stage, which were classified between places second and fifth of the regular season. The regional stage is a single match played on neutral ground. The second classified will face the fifth classified; and the third will do the same with the fourth. The winners of the two series will play a match to determine the team that will qualify for the national stage.

In the regional phase, if a match ends in a draw, extra time will be played, if the same result is maintained at the end of extra time, the best seeded team will win.

The national stage will be played by 18 teams, which won their respective regional play-offs. Nine different matches will be played to determine the winners of the promotion to Segunda RFEF.

== Qualified teams ==
| Group 1 | | Group 2 | | Group 3 | | Group 4 | | Group 5 | | Group 6 | |
|---|---|---|---|---|---|---|---|---|---|---|---|
| 2nd | **Ourense CF** | 2nd | Sporting Gijón B | 2nd | Vimenor | 2nd | **Beasain** | 2nd | **Olot** | 2nd | **Atlético Saguntino** |
| 3rd | Somozas | 3rd | Lealtad | 3rd | Escobedo | 3rd | Portugalete | 3rd | San Cristóbal | 3rd | Atzeneta |
| 4th | Barco | 4th | Llanes | 4th | Naval | 4th | Barakaldo | 4th | Girona B | 4th | Acero |
| 5th | Deportivo Fabril | 5th | Caudal | 5th | Torina | 5th | Basconia | 5th | Sant Andreu | 5th | Torrent |
| Group 7 | | Group 8 | | Group 9 | | Group 10 | | Group 11 | | Group 12 | |
| 2nd | Las Rozas | 2nd | Almazán | 2nd | Huétor Tájar | 2nd | **Utrera** | 2nd | Manacor | 2nd | Las Palmas C |
| 3rd | Fuenlabrada Promesas | 3rd | Ávila | 3rd | Marbella | 3rd | Xerez | 3rd | Poblense | 3rd | Tenerife B |
| 4th | **Alcorcón B** | 4th | Mirandés B | 4th | Almería B | 4th | Ciudad de Lucena | 4th | Platges de Calvià | 4th | Arucas |
| 5th | Paracuellos Antamira | 5th | Atlético Tordesillas | 5th | Atlético Malagueño | 5th | Gerena | 5th | Llosetense | 5th | Villa de Santa Brígida |
| Group 13 | | Group 14 | | Group 15 | | Group 16 | | Group 17 | | Group 18 | |
| 2nd | **Cartagena B** | 2nd | Moralo | 2nd | Subiza | 2nd | **Alfaro** | 2nd | **Utebo** | 2nd | Quintanar del Rey |
| 3rd | Racing Murcia | 3rd | Llerenense | 3rd | Txantrea | 3rd | Anguiano | 3rd | Illueca | 3rd | Illescas |
| 4th | UCAM Murcia B | 4th | Jerez | 4th | Huarte | 4th | Varea | 4th | Binéfar | 4th | Villarrobledo |
| 5th | La Unión Atlético | 5th | Arroyo | 5th | Cantolagua | 5th | Casalarreina | 5th | Robres | 5th | Torrijos |

- Teams in **bold** promoted to the Segunda RFEF
- Teams in italics progressed to the national stage

== Regional stage ==
=== Group 1 – Galicia ===
Playoffs were played at Estadio Verónica Boquete de San Lázaro, Santiago de Compostela (Semi–finals) and Estadio Anxo Carro, Lugo (Final)

Semifinals
2 | Ourense CF | 1
5 | Deportivo Fabril | 0
3 | Somozas | 2
4 | Barco | 3

Finals
2 | Ourense CF | 1
4 | Barco | 0

Group Champion: Polvorín

Play-off winner: Ourense CF

=== Group 2 – Asturias ===
Playoffs were played at Estadio Ganzábal, La Felguera (Langreo)

Semifinals
2 | Sporting Gijón B (a.e.t.) | 2
5 | Caudal | 1
3 | Lealtad (a.e.t.) | 3
4 | Llanes | 2

Finals
2 | Sporting Gijón B | 0
3 | Lealtad | 1

Group Champion: Real Oviedo Vetusta

Play-off winner: Lealtad

=== Group 3 – Cantabria ===
Playoffs were played at Estadio Santa Ana, Tanos (Torrelavega)

Semifinals
2 | Vimenor | 3
5 | Torina | 1
3 | Escobedo | 2
4 | Naval | 1

Finals
2 | Vimenor | 1
3 | Escobedo | 3

Group Champion: Gimnástica de Torrelavega

Play-off winner: Escobedo

=== Group 4 – Basque Country ===
Playoffs were played at Lezama Facilities, Lezama; Estadio de Lasesarre, Barakaldo (Semi–finals) and Zubieta Facilities, San Sebastián (Final)

Semifinals
2 | Beasain | 3
5 | Basconia | 0
3 | Portugalete (s) | 0
4 | Barakaldo | 0

Finals
2 | Beasain | 2
3 | Portugalete | 1

Group Champion: Deportivo Alavés B

Play-off winner: Beasain

=== Group 5 – Catalonia ===
Playoffs were played at Estadi Municipal de Can Roses, Rubí

Semifinals
2 | Olot | 1
5 | Sant Andreu | 0
3 | San Cristóbal | 0
4 | Girona B | 1

Finals
2 | Olot (s) | 1
4 | Girona B | 1

Group Champion: Manresa

Play-off winner: Olot

=== Group 6 – Valencian Community ===
Playoffs were played at Estadio Guillermo Olagüe, Gandia

Semifinals
2 | Atlético Saguntino | 2
5 | Torrent | 1
3 | Atzeneta | 2
4 | Acero | 0

Finals
2 | Atlético Saguntino (a.e.t.) | 1
3 | Atzeneta | 0

Group Champion: Valencia Mestalla

Play-off winner: Atlético Saguntino

=== Group 7 – Community of Madrid ===
Playoffs were played at Polideportivo Dehesa de Navalcarbón, Las Rozas

Semifinals
3 | Fuenlabrada Promesas | 2
4 | Alcorcón B | 3
2 | Las Rozas | 1
5 | Paracuellos Antamira (a.e.t.) | 3

Finals
4 | Alcorcón B (a.e.t.) | 1
5 | Paracuellos Antamira | 0

Group Champion: Atlético Madrid B

Play-off winner: Alcorcón B

=== Group 8 – Castile and León ===
Playoffs were played at Estadio La Arboleda, Almazán

Semifinals
3 | Ávila | 1
4 | Mirandés B (a.e.t.) | 3
2 | Almazán | 0
5 | Atlético Tordesillas | 1

Finals
4 | Mirandés B | 1
5 | Atlético Tordesillas (a.e.t.) | 2

Group Champion: Guijuelo

Play-off winner: Atlético Tordesillas

=== Group 9 – Eastern Andalusia ===
Playoffs were played at Estadio Francisco Muñoz Pérez, Estepona

Semifinals
2 | Huétor Tájar (a.e.t.) | 2
5 | Atlético Malagueño | 1
3 | Marbella | 1
4 | Almería B (a.e.t.) | 2

Finals
2 | Huétor Tájar | 1
4 | Almería B | 2

Group Champion: Juventud Torremolinos

Play-off winner: Almería B

=== Group 10 – Western Andalusia ===
Playoffs were played at Estadio Francisco Muñoz Pérez, Estepona

Semifinals
2 | Utrera | 2
5 | Gerena | 1
3 | Xerez | 2
4 | Ciudad de Lucena (a.e.t.) | 3

Finals
2 | Utrera (s) | 1
4 | Ciudad de Lucena | 1

Group Champion: Recreativo de Huelva

Play-off winner: Utrera

=== Group 11 – Balearic Islands ===
Playoffs were played at Estadi Son Bibiloni, Palma de Mallorca

Semifinals
2 | Manacor | 4
5 | Llosetense | 1
3 | Poblense (s) | 1
4 | Platges de Calvià | 1

Finals
2 | Manacor | 2
3 | Poblense | 1

Group Champion: Mallorca B

Play-off winner: Manacor

=== Group 12 – Canary Islands ===
Playoffs were played at Anexo Estadio Gran Canaria, Las Palmas

Semifinals
3 | Tenerife B | 2
4 | Arucas | 1
2 | Las Palmas C | 2
5 | Villa de Santa Brígida (a.e.t.) | 4

Finals
3 | Tenerife B | 4
5 | Villa de Santa Brígida | 0

Group Champion: Atlético Paso

Play-off winner: Tenerife B

=== Group 13 – Region of Murcia ===
Playoffs were played at Estadio Francisco Artés Carrasco, Lorca

Semifinals
2 | Cartagena B | 1
5 | La Unión Atlético | 0
3 | Racing Murcia | 1
4 | UCAM Murcia B | 0

Finals
2 | Cartagena B | 1
3 | Racing Murcia | 0

Group Champion: Yeclano

Play-off winner: Cartagena B

=== Group 14 – Extremadura ===
Playoffs were played at Estadio Francisco de la Hera, Almendralejo

Semifinals
2 | Moralo | 3
5 | Arroyo | 0
3 | Llerenense (s) | 1
4 | Jerez | 1

Finals
2 | Moralo | 0
3 | Llerenense | 1

Group Champion: Diocesano

Play-off winner: Llerenense

=== Group 15 – Navarre ===
Playoffs were played at Estadio de San Francisco, Tafalla

Semifinals
2 | Subiza (a.e.t.) | 2
5 | Cantolagua | 1
3 | Txantrea (a.e.t.) | 3
4 | Huarte | 1

Finals
2 | Subiza | 1
3 | Txantrea | 2

Group Champion: Cirbonero

Play-off winner: Txantrea

=== Group 16 – La Rioja ===
Playoffs were played at Estadio El Mazo, Haro

Semifinals
2 | Alfaro | 3
5 | Casalarreina | 0
3 | Anguiano | 1
4 | Varea | 2

Finals
2 | Alfaro | 1
4 | Varea | 0

Group Champion: Arnedo

Play-off winner: Alfaro

=== Group 17 – Aragon ===
Playoffs were played at Estadio Papa Luna, Illueca

Semifinals
2 | Utebo (a.e.t.) | 4
5 | Robres | 2
3 | Illueca (s) | 1
4 | Binéfar | 1

Finals
2 | Utebo | 2
3 | Illueca | 0

Group Champion: Deportivo Aragón

Play-off winner: Utebo

=== Group 18 – Castilla–La Mancha ===
Playoffs were played at Estadio Manuel Delgado Meco, Alcázar de San Juan (Semi–finals) and Estadio Municipal Paco Gálvez, Tomelloso (Final)

Semifinals
2 | Quintanar del Rey (s) | 1
5 | Torrijos | 1
3 | Illescas | 0
4 | Villarrobledo | 1

Finals
2 | Quintanar del Rey (a.e.t.) | 1
4 | Villarrobledo | 0

Group Champion: Guadalajara

Play-off winner: Quintanar del Rey

== National stage ==
=== Format ===
The eighteen qualifying teams will be drawn into nine single-leg neutral site matches to determine the final promotion spots. For the purposes of the draw, the qualifying teams will be placed into pots corresponding to their final regular-season position in their respective groups (i.e. second-place finishers will be placed in one pot, third-place finishers in another, and so on). Participants will then be drawn such as to pit the highest remaining teams against the lowest. When teams that achieved the same standings finish are drawn to face each other, the team drawn first will be designated the home team.

In games ending in a draw at the end of regulation, an overtime period will be played. If the scores are still level at the end of the overtime period, the team that achieved a higher regular season finish will be crowned the winner (a penalty shootout will be held in matches between teams level on standings).

All matches will be played in Las Rozas, 20 km northwest of Madrid, at the main field of the La Ciudad del Fútbol and at the nearby Campo Municipal Dehesa de Navalcarbón.

=== Qualified teams ===
| Group | Position | Team |
|---|---|---|
| 1 | 2nd | **Ourense CF** |
| 4 | 2nd | **Beasain** |
| 5 | 2nd | **Olot** |
| 6 | 2nd | **Atlético Saguntino** |
| 10 | 2nd | **Utrera** |
| 11 | 2nd | Manacor |
| 13 | 2nd | **Cartagena B** |
| 16 | 2nd | **Alfaro** |
| 17 | 2nd | **Utebo** |
| 18 | 2nd | Quintanar del Rey |

| Group | Position | Team |
|---|---|---|
| 2 | 3rd | Lealtad |
| 3 | 3rd | Escobedo |
| 12 | 3rd | Tenerife B |
| 14 | 3rd | Llerenense |
| 15 | 3rd | Txantrea |

| Group | Position | Team |
|---|---|---|
| 7 | 4th | **Alcorcón B** |
| 9 | 4th | Almería B |

| Group | Position | Team |
|---|---|---|
| 8 | 5th | Tordesillas |

Bold indicates teams that were promoted

=== Matches ===
| Team 1 | Score | Team 2 |
|---|---|---|
| **Utrera** (a.e.t.) | 3–1 | Atlético Tordesillas |
| Manacor | 0–2 | **Alcorcón B** |
| **Utebo** (s) (a.e.t.) | 1–1 | Almería B |
| **Alfaro** (s) (a.e.t.) | 0–0 | Lealtad |
| **Ourense CF** | 4–0 | Llerenense |
| **Olot** | 1–0 | Tenerife B |
| **Beasain** | 3–0 | Txantrea |
| **Atlético Saguntino** | 3–0 | Escobedo |
| Quintanar del Rey | 1–2 | **Cartagena B** (a.e.t.) |

| 21 May 2022 | **Utrera** | **3–1** (a.e.t.) | Atlético Tordesillas | Las Rozas |
| 12:00 UTC+2 | Kiki 2'; Trabazo 92'; Cruz 112' | | Campos 16' | Stadium: Navalcarbón; Referee: Vicente Gil Coscollá |

| 21 May 2022 | Manacor | **0–2** | **Alcorcón B** | Las Rozas |
| 12:00 UTC+2 | | Report | Hernández 82'; Guillén 90+4' | Stadium: Ciudad del Fútbol; Referee: Héctor Juan Bustos |

| 21 May 2022 | **Utebo** | **1–1** (a.e.t.) | Almería B | Las Rozas |
| 19:00 UTC+2 | Pomareta 17' | Report | Rojas 90' | Stadium: Ciudad del Fútbol; Referee: Juan Luis Dávila Fernández |

| 21 May 2022 | **Alfaro** | **0–0** (a.e.t.) | Lealtad | Las Rozas |
| 19:00 UTC+2 | | Report | | Stadium: Navalcarbón; Referee: Ángel Caro Mogio |

| 21 May 2022 | **Ourense** | **4–0** | Llerenense | Las Rozas |
| 22:30 UTC+2 | Tiago Rodríguez 41'; Calvo 45' (own); Palmás 44', 72' | Report | | Stadium: Ciudad del Fútbol; Referee: Jorge Agustín Moreno |

| 22 May 2022 | **Olot** | **1–0** (a.e.t.) | Tenerife B | Las Rozas |
| 12:00 UTC+2 | Vallès 86' | | | Stadium: Ciudad del Fútbol; Referee: José Antonio Muñoz Blázquez |

| 22 May 2022 | **Beasain** | **3–0** | Txantrea | Las Rozas |
| 12:00 UTC+2 | Aranguren 23'; Orbegozo 82', 90' | Report | | Stadium: Navalcarbón; Referee: Jesús López Fernández |

| 22 May 2022 | **Atlético Saguntino** | **3–0** | Escobedo | Las Rozas |
| 19:30 UTC+2 | Boix 3'; Ferrán Giner 6'; Luis Gilabert 43' | Report | | Stadium: Ciudad del Fútbol; Referee: Rubén Suárez Iglesias |

| 22 May 2022 | Quintanar del Rey | **1–2** (a.e.t.) | **Cartagena B** | Las Rozas |
| 19:30 UTC+2 | Kain Amoud 21' | Report | de Pedro 76'; Dani Albiar 110' | Stadium: Navalcarbón; Referee: Luis Alonso Campos |

== Promoted teams ==
- The 18 teams that were promoted through regular season groups are included.
- The numbers of years after the last promotion are referred to the last participation of the club in Segunda División B, the division that was partially replaced by the Segunda División RFEF.

Promoted to Segunda División RFEF
| Alavés B (One year later) | Alcorcón B (First time ever) | Alfaro (13 years later) | Arnedo (33 years later) | Atlético Madrid B (One year later) | Atlético Paso (First time ever) | Atlético Saguntino (4 years later) | Beasain (20 years later) | Cartagena B (First time ever) |
| Cirbonero (First time ever) | Deportivo Aragón (4 years later) | Diocesano (First time ever) | Gimnástica Torrelavega (3 years later) | Guadalajara (6 years later) | Guijuelo (One year later) | Juventud Torremolinos (First time ever) | Mallorca B (5 years later) | Manresa (First time ever) |
| Olot (One year later) | Ourense CF (First time ever) | Oviedo Vetusta (One year later) | Polvorín (First time ever) | Recreativo (One year later) | Utebo (28 years later) | Utrera (26 years later) | Valencia Mestalla (One year later) | Yeclano (One year later) |
