= Narvaez =

Narváez
Origin
- Region of origin: Spain

Narvaez (also appearing with an acute accent, as Narváez) is a surname of Spanish and also Basque origin. Notable people with the surname include:

== Politics ==
- Elina Narváez, Ecuadorian politician
- Francisco de Narváez (born 1953), Colombian-born politician and businessman
- Javier Salinas Narváez (born 1965), Mexican politician
- Paula Narváez (born 1972), Chilean politician and psychologist
- Ramón María Narváez (1800–1868), Spanish general and statesman

== Sports ==
=== Baseball ===
- Carlos Narváez (born 1998), Venezuelan baseball player
- Omar Narváez (baseball) (born 1992), Venezuelan baseball player

=== Boxing ===
- Frankie Narvaez (1939–2004), Puerto Rican boxer
- Omar Narváez (boxer) (born 1975), Argentine boxer

=== Cycling ===
- Jhonatan Narváez (born 1997), Ecuadorian racing cyclist
- Leonardo Narváez (born 1980), Colombian track cyclist
- Rafael Narváez (born 1950), Colombian cyclist

=== Football (soccer) ===
- Aldana Narváez (born 2001), Argentine footballer
- David Narváez (born 1985), Spanish footballer
- Francisco Miguel Narváez Machón (born 1972), better known as Kiko, Spanish football player
- Giovanni Narváez (born 1983), Chilean footballer
- John Narváez (born 1991), Ecuadorian footballer
- Juanjo Narváez (born 1995), Colombian footballer
- Luis Narváez (born 1984), Colombian footballer
- Orlando Narváez (born 1958), Ecuadorian footballer
- Sergio Narváez (born 1985), Spanish footballer

=== Other sports ===
- Ingrid Yahoska Narvaez (born 1994), Nicaraguan sprinter
- Manuel Narvaez (born 1981), Puerto Rican basketball player
- Mauricio de Narváez (born 1941), Colombian racing driver
- Max Narváez (born 1957), Paraguayan judoka
- Roger Narvaez (born 1983), American mixed martial artist

== Writing ==
- Israel Narvaez (fl. 1950s), gang leader in New York who later wrote about his experiences
- Luis Pacheco de Narváez (1570–1640), Spanish author
- Peter Narváez (1942–2011), Canadian writer, scholar, folklorist, and musician
- Richie Narvaez (born 1965), American author and professor

== Other ==
- Begoña Narváez (born 1987), Mexican actress and model
- Darcia Narvaez, American psychologist
- Francisco Narváez (1905–1982), Venezuelan sculptor and painter
- Gilberto Jiménez Narváez (1937–2015), Roman Catholic bishop in Colombia
- José María Narváez (1768–1840), Spanish explorer and navigator
- Julio Castillo Narváez (died 2011), Peruvian radio producer and host
- Luis de Narváez (fl. 1526–1549), Spanish composer
- Luis de Narváez (conquistador) (died 1562), Spanish conquistador
- Pánfilo de Narváez (1478–1528), Spanish conquistador and explorer
- Yadira Narváez (born 1985), Colombian serial killer

== See also ==
- Narváez expedition, a Spanish expedition that started in 1527 and was intended to explore Florida
