= Trofeo Junta de Comunidades de Castilla-La Mancha =

The Trofeo Junta de Comunidades de Castilla-La Mancha is the regional stage of the Copa RFEF in Castile-La Mancha and its main regional cup. Organized by the Castile-La Mancha Football Federation, it is played by the best teams of the region.

== History ==
Created in 1997 as Trofeo Junta de Comunidades de Castilla-La Mancha, it was folded in 2010.

In 2016, the Government of Castile-La Mancha decided to reinstate the tournament as the Regional Stage of the Copa Federación de España. One year later, the club recovered the old name of the tournament, this time being played without the teams of qualified for the Copa del Rey.

== Finals ==
Year	Host	Winner	Runner-up	Score
1997	Daimiel	Albacete	Toledo	2–1
1998	Villarrobledo	Albacete	Toledo	2–1
1999	Manzanares	Albacete	Toledo	2–0
2001	Toledo	Conquense	Toledo	1–0
2002	Albacete	Albacete	Talavera	1–0
2003	Tomelloso	Albacete	Tomelloso	3–0
2004	Cuenca	Conquense	Albacete	2–1
2005	Tomelloso	Conquense	Tomelloso	3–2
2006	Puertollano	Puertollano	Conquense	1–0
2007	Alcázar de San Juan	Conquense	Guadalajara	1–0
2008	Puertollano	Albacete	Puertollano	1–0
2009	Guadalajara	Guadalajara	Puertollano	2–0
2010	Alcázar de San Juan	Conquense	Puertollano	2–0
2016	La Roda	Albacete	Madridejos	0–0 (4–3 p)
2017	Villarrobledo	Villarrobledo	Conquense	4–1

== Champions ==
Teams	Winners	Runners-up	Winning years
Albacete	7	1	1997, 1998, 1999, 2002, 2003, 2008, 2016
Conquense	5	2	2001, 2004, 2005, 2007, 2010
Puertollano	1	3	2006
Guadalajara	1	1	2009
Villarrobledo	1	0	2017
Toledo	0	4	
Tomelloso	0	2	
Talavera	0	1	
Madridejos	0	1	
