= Óscar López (footballer, born 1984) =

Spanish footballer

Personal information
- Full name: Óscar López Martínez
- Date of birth: 5 February 1984 (age 42)
- Place of birth: Valencia, Spain
- Height: 1.91 m (6 ft 3 in)
- Position: Centre back

Youth career
- Real Madrid
- 2000–2003: Levante

Senior career*
Years	Team	Apps	(Gls)
2003–2004	Barrio Luz		
2004–2005	Benidorm	10	(1)
2005–2007	Villarreal B		
2006	Villarreal	1	(0)
2007–2010	Benidorm	87	(6)
2010–2011	Dénia	33	(3)
2011–2012	Ontinyent	30	(0)
2012–2016	Alcoyano	109	(2)
2016–2018	Saguntino	60	(0)
- * Club domestic league appearances and goals as of 11 November 2018

Óscar López Martínez (born 5 February 1984) is a Spanish former footballer who played as a central defender.

== Football career ==
Born in Valencia, López made his debut as a senior with amateurs CFA Barrio de la Luz. He first appeared in Segunda División B in the 2004–05 season, featuring in less than one third of the matches for Benidorm CF.

In the summer of 2005, López joined Villarreal CF, initially being assigned to the reserves in Tercera División. He made his first and only La Liga appearance with the former on 22 April 2006, starting in a 0–2 home defeat against Real Sociedad; additionally, he helped the B's promote to the third level in 2007.

In the following six years, López competed in division three, representing Benidorm, CD Dénia, Ontinyent CF and CD Alcoyano.
