= Canillas (footballer) =

Spanish footballer (born 1996)

Personal information
- Full name: Jorge Peláez Sánchez
- Date of birth: 29 June 1996 (age 30)
- Place of birth: Málaga, Spain
- Height: 1.88 m (6 ft 2 in)
- Position: Forward

Team information
- Current team: Arenas Armilla

Youth career
- Málaga
- 2011–2013: Tiro Pichón
- 2013–2014: Atlético Madrid
- 2014–2015: Granada

Senior career*
Years	Team	Apps	(Gls)
2014–2017	Granada B	2	(0)
2016–2017	→ Linares Deportivo (loan)	10	(0)
2017	UCAM Murcia B	15	(10)
2017–2018	Écija	21	(2)
2018–2019	Blau-Weiß Linz	20	(6)
2019–2021	SV Ried	7	(1)
2020	→ SV Horn (loan)	5	(6)
2020	SV Ried II	4	(3)
2021	Algeciras	8	(1)
2021–2022	Atlético Sanluqueño	25	(2)
2022–2023	FV Ravensburg	11	(5)
2023	Coria	10	(1)
2023	SPG Wels	0	(0)
2023–2024	Jhapa	8	(1)
2024	Lanzarote	12	(5)
2024–2025	Ibarra	13	(6)
2025	Al-Ittifaq		
2025–	Arenas Armilla	4	(0)
- * Club domestic league appearances and goals as of 8 November 2025

Jorge Peláez Sánchez (born 29 September 1996), commonly known as Canillas, is a Spanish professional footballer who plays for Tercera Federación club Arenas Armilla as a forward.

== Club career ==
Born in Málaga, Canillas represented Málaga CF, CD Tirro Pichon, Atlético Madrid and Granada CF as a youth. On 29 November 2014, he made his senior debut for Granada CF B, coming on as a substitute for Gabriel Corozo in a 1–0 defeat against Sevilla Atlético. On 23 July 2015, he signed a three-year contract extension with the club. On 1 September 2016, he was loaned out to Linares Deportivo. On 9 January 2017, he left Linares Deportivo. On the next day, his contract was terminated by mutual consent.

Canillas switched to UCAM Murcia CF B on 31 January 2017. After a stint with Écija Balompié, he moved abroad and joined Austrian club FC Blau-Weiß Linz on 7 June 2018.

== Career statistics ==
As of match played on 31 August 2018

Club	Season	League			Cup		Other		Total	
Club	Season	Division	Apps	Goals	Apps	Goals	Apps	Goals	Apps	Goals
Granada B	2014–15	Segunda División B	1	0	—		—		1	0
Granada B	2015–16	Segunda División B	1	0	—		—		1	0
Granada B	Total		2	0	—		—		2	0
Linares Deportivo (loan)	2016–17	Segunda División B	10	0	0	0	—		10	0
UCAM Murcia B	2016–17	Tercera División	15	10	—		—		15	10
Écija	2017–18	Segunda División B	21	2	0	0	—		21	2
Blau-Weiß Linz	2018–19	Erste Liga	5	1	0	0	—		5	1
Career total			48	13	0	0	0	0	48	13
