= CD Cortes =

Spanish football team

Cortes
- Full name: Club Deportivo Cortes
- Nickname: Rojillos
- Founded: 1927
- Ground: San Francisco Javier, Cortes, Navarre, Spain
- Capacity: 1,000
- Chairman: (Spain) Javier Royo
- Manager: (Spain) Rubén Zapater
- League: Tercera Federación – Group 15
- 2025–26: Tercera Federación – Group 15, 9th of 18
Home colours

Club Deportivo Cortes is a Spanish football team based in Cortes, in the autonomous community of Navarre. Founded in 1927, it currently plays in Tercera Federación – Group 15, holding home games at Estadio San Francisco Javier, which has a capacity of 1,000 people.

== History ==
In the 2017-18 season, the club finished 8th in the Tercera División, Group 15.

== Season to season ==
Season	Tier	Division	Place	Copa del Rey
1950–51	5	2ª Reg.	4th	
1951–1959	DNP			
1959–60	5	2ª Reg.	2nd	
1960–61	4	1ª Reg.	9th	
1961–62	4	1ª Reg.	7th	
1962–63	DNP			
1963–64	DNP			
1964–65	5	2ª Reg.	4th	
1965–66	5	2ª Reg.	1st	
1966–67	4	1ª Reg.	13th	
1967–68	5	2ª Reg.	2nd	
1968–69	5	2ª Reg.	2nd	
1969–70	5	2ª Reg.	4th	
1970–71	5	2ª Reg.	1st	
1971–72	4	1ª Reg.	14th	
1972–73	4	1ª Reg.	11th	
1973–74	4	1ª Reg.	17th	
1974–75	5	1ª Reg.	8th	
1975–76	5	1ª Reg.	2nd	
1976–77	4	Reg. Pref.	10th	

Season	Tier	Division	Place	Copa del Rey
1977–78	5	Reg. Pref.	20th	
1978–79	6	1ª Reg.	13th	
1979–80	6	1ª Reg.	7th	
1980–81	6	1ª Reg.	7th	
1981–82	6	1ª Reg.	13th	
1982–83	6	1ª Reg.	5th	
1983–84	6	1ª Reg.	11th	
1984–85	6	1ª Reg.	8th	
1985–86	6	1ª Reg.	15th	
1986–87	6	1ª Reg.	9th	
1987–88	6	1ª Reg.	6th	
1988–89	6	1ª Reg.	3rd	
1989–90	5	Reg. Pref.	6th	
1990–91	5	Reg. Pref.	3rd	
1991–92	5	Reg. Pref.	5th	
1992–93	5	Reg. Pref.	13th	
1993–94	5	Reg. Pref.	11th	
1994–95	5	Reg. Pref.	2nd	
1995–96	4	3ª	15th	
1996–97	4	3ª	12th	

Season	Tier	Division	Place	Copa del Rey
1997–98	4	3ª	20th	
1998–99	5	Reg. Pref.	11th	
1999–2000	5	Reg. Pref.	18th	
2000–01	6	1ª Reg.	10th	
2001–02	6	1ª Reg.	10th	
2002–03	6	1ª Reg.	6th	
2003–04	6	1ª Reg.	4th	
2004–05	6	1ª Reg.	4th	
2005–06	6	1ª Reg.	4th	
2006–07	5	Reg. Pref.	8th	
2007–08	5	Reg. Pref.	9th	
2008–09	5	Reg. Pref.	2nd	
2009–10	4	3ª	20th	
2010–11	5	Reg. Pref.	3rd	
2011–12	4	3ª	17th	
2012–13	4	3ª	4th	
2013–14	4	3ª	7th	
2014–15	4	3ª	7th	
2015–16	4	3ª	5th	
2016–17	4	3ª	4th	

Season	Tier	Division	Place	Copa del Rey
2017–18	4	3ª	8th	
2018–19	4	3ª	5th	
2019–20	4	3ª	12th	
2020–21	4	3ª	5th	
2021–22	5	3ª RFEF	6th	
2022–23	5	3ª Fed.	9th	
2023–24	5	3ª Fed.	2nd	
2024–25	5	3ª Fed.	4th	First round
2025–26	5	3ª Fed.	9th	
2026–27	5	3ª Fed.		

- 14 seasons in Tercera División
- 5 seasons in Tercera Federación/Tercera División RFEF
