= David Narváez =

Spanish footballer

Personal information
- Full name: David Narváez Barrera
- Date of birth: 11 July 1985 (age 41)
- Place of birth: Jerez de la Frontera, Spain
- Height: 1.70 m (5 ft 7 in)
- Positions: Winger; forward

Team information
- Current team: Lucena

Youth career
- Xerez

Senior career*
Years	Team	Apps	(Gls)
2004–2006	Xerez B		
2005–2008	Xerez	9	(3)
2006–2007	→ Ceuta (loan)	6	(0)
2007–2008	→ Los Palacios (loan)	36	(15)
2008–2009	Jerez Industrial	39	(16)
2009–2010	Puerto Real	17	(4)
2010	Lorca Deportiva		
2010–2011	Ronda	7	(0)
2011	San Fernando	3	(0)
2011–2012	Amposta		(9)
2012–2013	Algeciras	24	(2)
2013–2014	Conquense	31	(4)
2014–	Lucena	3	(0)
- * Club domestic league appearances and goals as of 27 October 2014

David Narváez Barrera (born 11 July 1985) is a Spanish footballer who plays for Lucena CF as a winger or forward.

== Football career ==
Born in Jerez de la Frontera, Andalusia, Narváez was a product of the youth system at his hometown club, Xerez CD. He made his senior debuts with the reserves in the 2004–05 season, competing for several years with the side in the lower leagues. On 22 May 2005 he made his professional debut, starting in a 0–0 home draw against Recreativo de Huelva in the Segunda División. He scored his first professional goal in the next match, in a 1–1 away draw against Real Murcia.

In August 2006, Narváez and his brother were loaned to AD Ceuta of the Segunda División B. The following July he joined UD Los Palacios of the Tercera División, also on loan.

Narváez left Xerez in the 2008 summer, and played the five following seasons in the fourth tier, representing Jerez Industrial CF, Puerto Real CF, Lorca Deportiva CF, CD Ronda, San Fernando CD, CF Amposta and Algeciras CF.

On 19 July 2013 Narváez returned to the Segunda B, joining UB Conquense. After being ever-present in midfield during the campaign, he moved to fellow third-tier team Lucena CF on 4 July 2014.

== Personal life ==
Narváez's twin brother and cousin, Sergio and Kiko, respectively, are both footballers; the former played alongside him in Xerez, and the latter spent most of his career with Atlético Madrid.
