= UCAM Murcia CF B =

Association football club in Spain

UCAM Murcia B
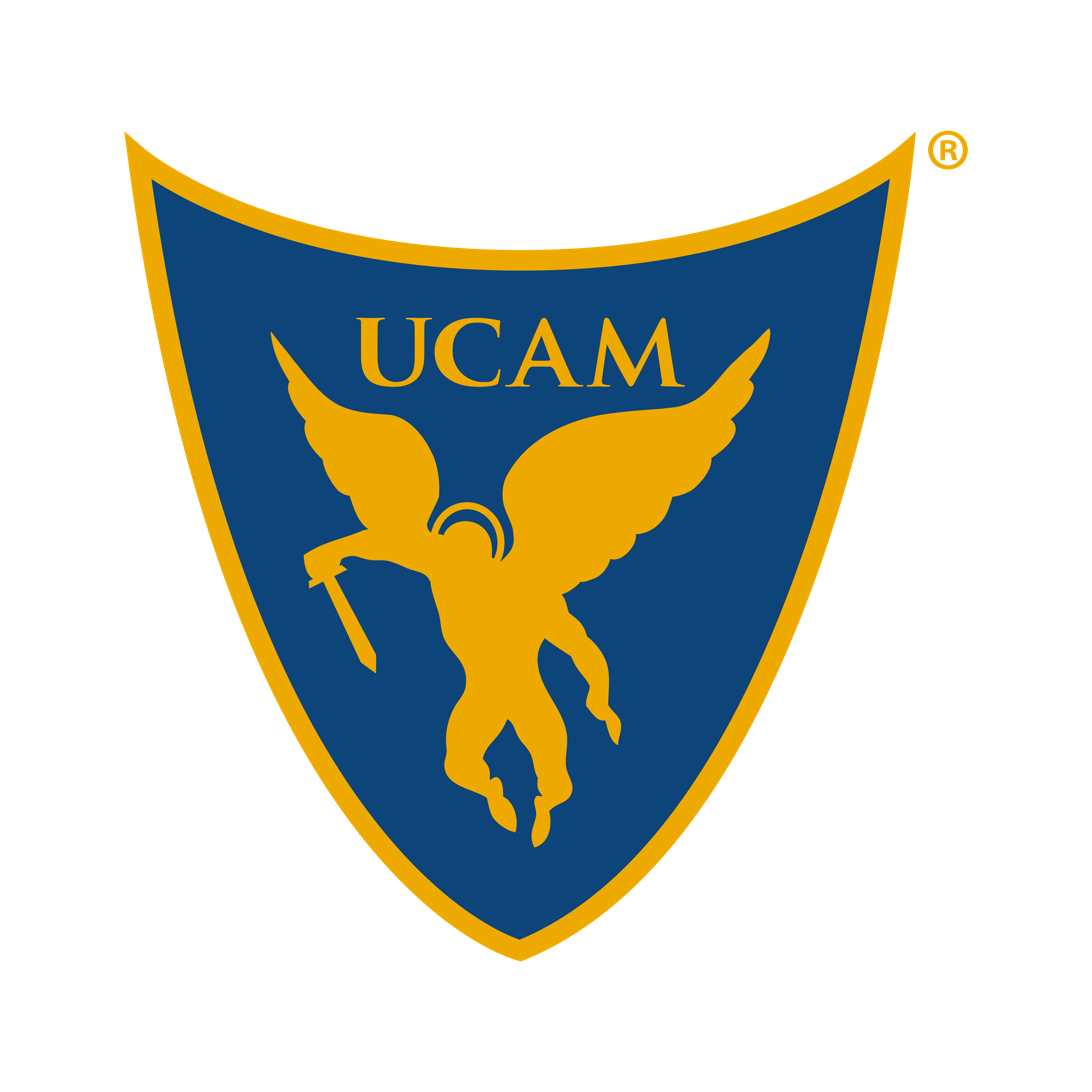
- Full name: Universidad Católica de Murcia Club de Fútbol B
- Nickname: Universitarios
- Founded: 2013
- Ground: El Mayayo, Sangonera, Spain
- Capacity: 3,500
- Owner: Universidad Católica de Murcia
- Chairman: José Luis Mendoza
- Manager: Sergio Aracil
- League: Tercera Federación – Group 13
- 2025–26: Tercera Federación – Group 13, 6th of 18
- Website: http://www.ucamdeportes.com/ucamcf/
Home colours	Away colours	Third colours

Universidad Católica de Murcia Club de Fútbol "B" is a Spanish football club based in Murcia. A reserve team of UCAM Murcia CF, it plays in Tercera Federación – Group 13, holding home games at Estadio El Mayayo, with a capacity of 3,500 spectators.

== History ==
The club was founded under the name of Sangonera La Verde CF, and was bought by UCAM in July 2015. During his first season with the new administration, it achieved promotion to Tercera División after finishing second.

=== Club names ===
- Sangonera la Verde Club de Fútbol (2013–15)
- Sangonera UCAM Club de Fútbol (2015–2016)
- UCAM Murcia Club de Fútbol "B" (2016-)

== Season to season ==
As Sangonera La Verde CF

Season	Tier	Division	Place	Copa del Rey
2013–14	6	1ª Aut.	2nd	
2014–15	5	Pref. Aut.	6th	

As UCAM Murcia CF B

Season	Tier	Division	Place
2015–16	5	Pref. Aut.	2nd
2016–17	4	3ª	8th
2017–18	4	3ª	10th
2018–19	4	3ª	8th
2019–20	4	3ª	6th
2020–21	4	3ª	6th / 4th
2021–22	5	3ª RFEF	4th
2022–23	5	3ª Fed.	8th
2023–24	5	3ª Fed.	4th
2024–25	5	3ª Fed.	7th
2025–26	5	3ª Fed.	6th
2026–27	5	3ª Fed.	

- 5 seasons in Tercera División
- 6 seasons in Tercera Federación/Tercera División RFEF

== Current squad ==
As of 6 May 2017

Note: Flags indicate national team as defined under FIFA eligibility rules; some limited exceptions apply. Players may hold more than one non-FIFA nationality.

No.	Pos.	Nation	Player
—	GK	ESP	Ginés Guzmán
—	GK	ESP	José Vivancos
—	DF	ESP	Antoñico
—	DF	ESP	Antonio Escribano
—	DF	ESP	Edu Luna
—	DF	ESP	Javi Fernández
—	DF	ESP	Miguel
—	DF	ESP	Nacho Lorenzo
—	DF	ESP	Pablo Rayón
—	MF	ESP	Álvaro

No.	Pos.	Nation	Player
—	MF	ESP	Carlos Cobos
—	MF	ESP	Javi Pedrosa
—	MF	ESP	José Paredes
—	MF	ESP	Luis Castillo
—	MF	ESP	Tote
—	FW	ESP	Canillas
—	FW	ESP	Javi Salinas
—	FW	ESP	Jorge López
—	FW	ESP	Pipo

== Trophies ==
- Copa Federación de España (Murcia tournament): (1)
  - 2016
