= CP Amanecer =

Amanecer
- Full name: Club Polideportivo Amanecer
- Founded: 1969
- Ground: San Isidro, Sierra de Fuentes, Extremadura, Spain
- Capacity: 700
- Chairman: Juan Galeano
- Manager: José Manuel Romero
- League: Primera Extremeña – Group 1
- 2024–25: Primera Extremeña – Group 1, 9th of 12
Home colours	Away colours

Club Polideportivo Amanecer is a Spanish football team based in Sierra de Fuentes, in the autonomous community of Extremadura. Founded in 1969, it plays in Primera Extremeña – Group 1, holding home games at Campo Municipal San Isidro.

== Season to season ==
Season	Tier	Division	Place	Copa del Rey
1969–70	5	2ª Reg.	2nd	
1970–71	DNP			
1971–72	DNP			
1972–73	5	2ª Reg.	4th	
1973–74	5	2ª Reg.	4th	
1974–75	6	2ª Reg.	4th	
1975–76	6	2ª Reg.	3rd	
1976–77	6	2ª Reg.	4th	
1977–78	7	2ª Reg.	3rd	
1978–79	8	3ª Reg.	7th	
1979–80	7	2ª Reg.	13th	
1980–1987	DNP			
1987–88	6	1ª Reg.	7th	
1988–89	6	1ª Reg.	8th	
1989–90	6	1ª Reg.	6th	
1990–91	6	1ª Reg.	1st	
1991–92	5	Reg. Pref.	19th	
1992–93	6	1ª Reg.	4th	
1993–94	6	1ª Reg.	5th	
1994–95	6	1ª Reg.	4th	

Season	Tier	Division	Place	Copa del Rey
1995–96	6	1ª Reg.	10th	
1996–97	6	1ª Reg.	3rd	
1997–98	5	Reg. Pref.	13th	
1998–99	5	Reg. Pref.	10th	
1999–2000	5	Reg. Pref.	7th	
2000–01	5	Reg. Pref.	5th	
2001–02	5	Reg. Pref.	3rd	
2002–03	5	Reg. Pref.	1st	
2003–04	4	3ª	15th	
2004–05	4	3ª	17th	
2005–06	4	3ª	18th	
2006–07	5	Reg. Pref.	2nd	
2007–08	5	Reg. Pref.	4th	
2008–09	5	Reg. Pref.	5th	
2009–10	5	Reg. Pref.	12th	
2010–11	5	Reg. Pref.	13th	
2011–12	5	Reg. Pref.	12th	
2012–13	5	Reg. Pref.	11th	
2013–14	5	Reg. Pref.	10th	
2014–15	5	Reg. Pref.	1st	

Season	Tier	Division	Place	Copa del Rey
2015–16	4	3ª	16th	
2016–17	4	3ª	12th	
2017–18	4	3ª	18th	
2018–19	5	1ª Ext.	6th	
2019–20	5	1ª Ext.	2nd	
2020–21	5	1ª Ext.	2nd	
2021–22	6	1ª Ext.	4th	
2022–23	6	1ª Ext.	4th	
2023–24	6	1ª Ext.	2nd	
2024–25	6	1ª Ext.	9th	
2025–26	6	1ª Ext.		

- 6 seasons in Tercera División
