= CD Madridejos =

Association football club in Spain

Madridejos
- Full name: Club Deportivo Madridejos
- Founded: 1968
- Ground: Nuevo Estadio, Madridejos, Castilla-La Mancha, Spain
- Capacity: 2,000
- Chairman: (Spain) Faustino Sánchez
- Manager: (Spain) Paco Senda
- League: Primera Autonómica Preferente – Group 2
- 2024–25: Primera Autonómica Preferente – Group 2, 6th of 18
Home colours	Away colours

Club Deportivo Madridejos is a football club based in Madridejos, Castile-La Mancha, Spain. Founded in 1968, the team plays in Primera Autonómica Preferente – Group 2. The club's home ground is Nuevo Estadio, with a 2,000-seat capacity.

== Season to season ==
Season	Tier	Division	Place	Copa del Rey
1968–69	6	3ª Reg.	3rd	
1969–70	7	3ª Reg.	1st	
1970–71	7	3ª Reg.	3rd	
1971–72	7	3ª Reg.	6th	
1972–73	7	3ª Reg.	11th	
1973–74	7	3ª Reg. P.	8th	
1974–75	7	3ª Reg. P.	8th	
1975–76	6	2ª Reg.	16th	
1976–77	6	2ª Reg.	20th	
1977–78	8	3ª Reg. P.	12th	
1978–79	8	3ª Reg. P.	3rd	
1979–80	7	2ª Reg.	13th	
1980–81	7	2ª Reg.	12th	
1981–82	7	2ª Reg.	15th	
1982–83	7	2ª Reg.	6th	
1983–84	7	2ª Reg.	3rd	
1984–85	7	2ª Reg.	3rd	
1985–86	7	2ª Reg.	1st	
1986–87	5	Reg. Pref.	3rd	
1987–88	4	3ª	8th	

Season	Tier	Division	Place	Copa del Rey
1988–89	4	3ª	13th	
1989–90	4	3ª	15th	
1990–91	4	3ª	17th	
1991–92	5	Reg. Pref.	6th	
1992–93	5	Reg. Pref.	15th	
1993–94	5	Reg. Pref.	16th	
1994–95	5	Reg. Pref.	13th	
1995–96	5	1ª Aut.	7th	
1996–97	5	1ª Aut.	8th	
1997–98	5	1ª Aut.	4th	
1998–99	5	1ª Aut.	4th	
1999–2000	5	1ª Aut.	7th	
2000–01	5	1ª Aut.	11th	
2001–02	5	1ª Aut.	12th	
2002–03	5	1ª Aut.	14th	
2003–04	5	1ª Aut.	5th	
2004–05	5	1ª Aut.	3rd	
2005–06	5	1ª Aut.	17th	
2006–07	6	2ª Aut.	1st	
2007–08	5	Aut. Pref.	6th	

Season	Tier	Division	Place	Copa del Rey
2008–09	5	Aut. Pref.	13th	
2009–10	5	Aut. Pref.	4th	
2010–11	5	Aut. Pref.	2nd	
2011–12	4	3ª	9th	
2012–13	4	3ª	15th	
2013–14	4	3ª	17th	
2014–15	4	3ª	5th	
2015–16	4	3ª	6th	
2016–17	4	3ª	10th	
2017–18	4	3ª	13th	
2018–19	4	3ª	11th	
2019–20	4	3ª	19th	
2020–21	4	3ª	10th / 9th	
2021–22	6	Aut. Pref.	5th	
2022–23	6	Aut. Pref.	4th	
2023–24	6	Aut. Pref.	2nd	
2024–25	6	Aut. Pref.	6th	
2025–26	6	Aut. Pref.		

- 14 seasons in Tercera División

== Notable players ==
- (Mali) Soumaïla Konaré
