= Sergio Narváez =

Spanish footballer

Personal information
- Full name: Sergio Narváez Barrera
- Date of birth: 11 July 1985 (age 41)
- Place of birth: Jerez de la Frontera, Spain
- Height: 1.70 m (5 ft 7 in)
- Position: Winger

Team information
- Current team: Xerez Deportivo

Youth career
- Xerez

Senior career*
Years	Team	Apps	(Gls)
2004–2007	Xerez B		
2005–2007	Xerez	6	(0)
2006	→ Ceuta (loan)	7	(0)
2007–2009	Portuense	31	(4)
2009	Jerez Industrial	17	(0)
2009–2010	Lorca Deportiva	36	(14)
2010–2012	Villanovense	60	(28)
2012–2013	Don Benito	37	(11)
2013–2016	Marbella	101	(31)
2016–2017	Socuéllamos	19	(1)
2017	El Ejido	14	(2)
2017–2018	Marbella	22	(1)
2018–2019	Xerez	37	(5)
2019–	Xerez Deportivo	3	(0)
- * Club domestic league appearances and goals as of 19:08, 17 September 2019 (UTC)

Sergio Narváez Barrera (born 11 July 1985) is a Spanish footballer who plays for Xerez Deportivo FC as a winger.

== Football career ==
Born in Jerez de la Frontera, Andalusia, Narváez was a product of hometown Xerez CD's youth system, and made senior debuts with the reserves in the 2004–05 season, competing several years with the side in the lower leagues. On 28 May 2005 he made his professional debut, coming on as a second-half substitute in a 1–1 away draw against Real Murcia.

In August 2006, Narváez and his brother were loaned to AD Ceuta, in Segunda División B. In July of the following year he rescinded with the Andalusians and moved to Racing Club Portuense, in the same level.

After failing to appear in the half of the 2008–09 campaign, Narváez moved to Tercera División's Jerez Industrial CF in January 2009. He continued to appear in the third and fourth divisions in the following seasons, representing Lorca Deportiva CF, CF Villanovense, CD Don Benito and Marbella FC, achieving a promotion in the end of 2013–14 with the latter.

== Personal life ==
Narváez's twin brother and cousin, David and Kiko, respectively, are both footballers; the former played alongside him in Xerez, and the latter spent most of his career with Atlético Madrid.
