= Álvaro Montero (Spanish footballer) =

Spanish footballer

Personal information
- Full name: Álvaro Montero Fernández
- Date of birth: 5 November 1989 (age 37)
- Place of birth: Madrid, Spain
- Height: 1.90 m (6 ft 3 in)
- Position: Forward

Team information
- Current team: Inter de Madrid
- Number: 21

Youth career
- Villaviciosa Odón

Senior career*
Years	Team	Apps	(Gls)
2008–2009	Villaviciosa Odón	11	(3)
2009–2010	Alcorcón B	29	(4)
2010–2011	Villaviciosa Odón	25	(7)
2011–2012	Zaragoza B	16	(4)
2012–2013	Alcalá	21	(3)
2013–2014	Zamora	19	(9)
2014–2015	Jaén	27	(11)
2015–2016	Cartagena	16	(3)
2016	Almería B	13	(2)
2016–2017	Burgos	29	(3)
2017–2018	Lealtad	27	(7)
2018–2019	Marbella	30	(7)
2019–2020	Bisceglie	25	(8)
2020–2021	Monopoli	7	(0)
2021	Fano	13	(1)
2021–	Inter de Madrid	9	(0)
- * Club domestic league appearances and goals as of 7 November 2021

Álvaro Montero Fernández (born 5 November 1989) is a Spanish footballer who plays for Inter de Madrid as a forward.

== Club career ==
Born in Madrid, Montero made his senior debuts with local AD Villaviciosa de Odón in the 2008–09 season. In the 2009 summer he joined AD Alcorcón B also in the lower leagues, but returned to former club in 2010.

In July 2011 Montero moved to another reserve team, Real Zaragoza B of the Segunda División B. After being sparingly used during the season, he joined fellow third-divisioner RSD Alcalá in July of the following year.

On 3 August 2013 Montero moved to Zamora CF, also in the third tier. After scoring nine times in 19 matches, he joined Real Jaén. On 23 February 2014 Montero played his first match as a professional, starting in a 0–0 away draw against Córdoba CF in the Segunda División.

On 6 August 2019, he signed with the Italian Serie C club Bisceglie.

On 25 August 2020 he moved to Monopoli.

On 22 January 2021, he joined Fano.
