= Pipo (footballer, born 1997) =

Spanish footballer

Personal information
- Full name: Rafael Ramos Jiménez
- Date of birth: 16 July 1997 (age 29)
- Place of birth: La Alberca, Spain
- Position: Winger

Team information
- Current team: Águilas
- Number: 11

Youth career
- Guadalupe
- 2013–2015: UCAM Murcia

Senior career*
Years	Team	Apps	(Gls)
2015–2018	UCAM Murcia B	57	(19)
2017	UCAM Murcia	1	(0)
2018–2019	Peña Deportiva	39	(7)
2019	Las Palmas B	0	(0)
2019–2020	Peña Deportiva	25	(3)
2020–2023	Alcorcón	0	(0)
2020–2021	→ Cultural Leonesa (loan)	21	(1)
2021–2022	→ Cornellà (loan)	32	(0)
2022–2023	→ Mar Menor (loan)	31	(5)
2023–2024	Talavera	31	(1)
2024–2025	Minera	32	(4)
2025–	Águilas	29	(1)
- * Club domestic league appearances and goals as of 7 May 2026

Rafael Ramos Jiménez (born 16 July 1997), commonly known as Pipo, is a Spanish footballer who plays as a winger for Águilas.

== Club career ==
Born in La Alberca, Salamanca, Castille and León, Pipo joined UCAM Murcia CF's youth setup in 2013, from AD Guadalupe. He made his senior debut with the reserves on 6 September 2015, starting in a 2–0 away win against Mazarrón FC, and scored his first senior goal seven days later in a 6–0 home routing of AD Alquerías.

After scoring eleven goals during the campaign and helping his side achieve promotion to the Tercera División, Pipo signed a one-year extension to his contract on 22 June 2016. He made his first-team debut on 6 May of the following year, coming on as a late substitute for Iban Salvador in a 0–1 away loss against CD Numancia in the Segunda División.

On 10 August 2018, Pipo left UCAM for SCR Peña Deportiva, winning the Balearic Islands group of the Tercera División and achieving promotion in his first season. He then signed for UD Las Palmas Atlético on 20 June 2019, but terminated his contract within three days, and went back to his former team in the Segunda División B.

On 17 September 2020, Pipo agreed to a three-year contract with AD Alcorcón, being immediately loaned to third division side Cultural y Deportiva Leonesa for the 2020–21 season. On 3 August of the following year, he moved to Primera División RFEF club UE Cornellà also in a temporary deal.
