= Diego Sánchez (footballer, born 1990) =

Spanish footballer

Personal information
- Full name: Diego Sánchez Montoya
- Date of birth: 4 May 1990 (age 36)
- Place of birth: Murcia, Spain
- Height: 1.86 m (6 ft 1 in)
- Position: Forward

Team information
- Current team: El Palmar

Youth career
- Murcia
- 2008–2009: Cabezo de Torres

Senior career*
Years	Team	Apps	(Gls)
2009–2010	Bala Azul	15	(6)
2010	Rayo Majadahonda	23	(5)
2010–2011	Jumilla	35	(2)
2011–2012	Lorca Atlético	33	(7)
2012–2013	Fuenlabrada	37	(13)
2013–2014	Ponferradina	15	(0)
2014–2015	Lleida Esportiu	37	(7)
2015–2016	Olot	26	(5)
2016–2017	Socuéllamos	23	(3)
2017–2018	Pinatar	16	(1)
2018	Villanovense	19	(0)
2018–2019	Jumilla	22	(0)
2019–2020	Minerva	12	(5)
2020	Lorca	3	(0)
2020–2021	Los Garres	37	(13)
2022–	El Palmar	78	(23)
- * Club domestic league appearances and goals as of 13 October 2024

Diego Sánchez Montoya (born 4 May 1990) is a Spanish footballer who plays for El Palmar as a forward.

== Club career ==
Born in Murcia, Sánchez played youth football with local Real Murcia and CA Cabezo de Torres, making his senior debuts in the 2009–10 season with CD Bala Azul in Tercera División. He first arrived in Segunda División B in the 2010 summer, signing with Jumilla CF.

Sánchez spent the following two years in the third level, with Lorca Atlético CF and CF Fuenlabrada. With the latter team, he scored a career-best 13 goals.

On 5 August 2013, Sánchez signed a two-year deal with SD Ponferradina from Segunda División. On 19 September, he appeared in his first game as a professional, playing the last five minutes in a 1–0 away win against AD Alcorcón.

On 12 August 2014, Sánchez terminated his contract with Ponfe, joining Lleida Esportiu for two seasons hours later.
