= Álex Cortell =

Spanish footballer

Personal information
- Full name: Alejandro Cortell Palanca
- Date of birth: 8 November 1990 (age 36)
- Place of birth: Moncada, Spain
- Height: 1.78 m (5 ft 10 in)
- Position: Forward

Team information
- Current team: Olímpic Xàtiva

Youth career
- Valencia

Senior career*
Years	Team	Apps	(Gls)
2009	Mouscron	2	(0)
2010–2011	Ribarroja	30	(11)
2011–2012	Alzira	41	(20)
2012–2014	Valencia B	51	(7)
2014–2015	Olímpic Xàtiva	26	(10)
2015	Sabadell	13	(2)
2016	Alcoyano	15	(4)
2016	Lleida Esportiu	0	(0)
2016–2017	Socuéllamos	33	(7)
2017–2018	Levante B	34	(14)
2018–	Olímpic Xàtiva	0	(0)
- * Club domestic league appearances and goals as of 13 May 2018

Alejandro 'Álex' Cortell Palanca (born 8 November 1990) is a Spanish professional footballer who plays for CD Olímpic de Xàtiva as a forward.

== Football career ==
Born in Moncada, Valencia, Cortell graduated with Valencia CF's youth setup, but moved abroad in the 2009 summer after signing with Belgian Pro League club Royal Excelsior Mouscron. On 8 August 2009 he made his professional debut, coming on as a first-half substitute in a 0–0 home draw against K.S.V. Roeselare, but left in December due to unpaid wages.

Cortell subsequently returned to his native country and represented Ribarroja CF and UD Alzira, both in Tercera División. After scoring 20 goals for the latter he returned to Valencia, being assigned to the reserves in Segunda División B.

Cortell continued to appear in the third division in the following years, representing CD Olímpic de Xàtiva, CE Sabadell FC, CD Alcoyano, Lleida Esportiu, UD Socuéllamos and Atlético Levante UD. He returned to Olímpic on 1 August 2018, with the club now in the fourth level.
