= Atlético Saguntino =

Spanish football team

- Full name: Atlético Saguntino
- Nickname: Romanos
- Founded: 1 July 1951; 75 years ago
- Ground: Nou Camp de Morvedre, Sagunto, Valencia, Spain
- Capacity: 4,000
- President: Juan Manuel Domingo
- Head coach: Guillem Beltrán
- League: Tercera Federación – Group 6
- 2025–26: Tercera Federación – Group 6, 2nd of 18
Home colours	Away colours

Atlético Saguntino (Spanish for 'Athletic Club of Sagunto') is a Spanish football team based in Sagunto, in the Valencian Community. Founded in 1951, they play in Tercera Federación – Group 6, holding home games at Camp Nou de Morvedre, with a 4,000-seat capacity.

== History ==
On 1 July 1951, Atlético Club Saguntino was founded in the facilities of the Café Español with Enrique Aleixandre Calvo as president, Miguel Fuertes de la Asunción as vice president, José Felip in the position of secretary and José Mena as vice secretary. In April 2016, Atlético Saguntino finished for the first time as champion of the Group VI of the Tercera División and qualified, subsequently, to play the promotion playoffs to Segunda División B. It achieved the promotion to Segunda División B after beating Calahorra in a penalty shootout.

In the next season, Atlético Saguntino achieved its first national title ever after defeating Fuenlabrada in the Copa Federación de España final.

== Season to season ==
Season	Tier	Division	Place	Copa del Rey
1951–52	5	2ª Reg.	4th	
1952–53	5	2ª Reg.	7th	
1953–54	5	2ª Reg.	1st	
1954–55	4	1ª Reg.	9th	
1955–56	4	1ª Reg.	7th	
1956–57	4	1ª Reg.	1st	
1957–58	3	3ª	10th	
1958–59	3	3ª	8th	
1959–60	3	3ª	13th	
1960–61	3	3ª	12th	
1961–62	3	3ª	10th	
1962–63	3	3ª	3rd	
1963–64	3	3ª	4th	
1964–65	3	3ª	10th	
1965–66	3	3ª	11th	
1966–67	3	3ª	11th	
1967–68	3	3ª	18th	
1968–69	4	1ª Reg.	14th	
1969–70	4	1ª Reg.	4th	
1970–71	4	Reg. Pref.	19th	

Season	Tier	Division	Place	Copa del Rey
1971–72	5	1ª Reg.	11th	
1972–73	5	1ª Reg.	4th	
1973–74	5	1ª Reg.	3rd	
1974–75	5	1ª Reg.	1st	
1975–76	4	Reg. Pref.	11th	
1976–77	4	Reg. Pref.	9th	
1977–78	5	Reg. Pref.	9th	
1978–79	6	1ª Reg.	5th	
1979–80	6	1ª Reg.	14th	
1980–81	6	1ª Reg.	16th	
1981–82	6	1ª Reg.	9th	
1982–83	6	1ª Reg.	7th	
1983–84	6	1ª Reg.	3rd	
1984–85	5	Reg. Pref.	9th	
1985–86	5	Reg. Pref.	8th	
1986–87	5	Reg. Pref.	1st	
1987–88	4	3ª	9th	
1988–89	4	3ª	20th	
1989–90	4	3ª	15th	
1990–91	4	3ª	12th	

Season	Tier	Division	Place	Copa del Rey
1991–92	4	3ª	4th	
1992–93	4	3ª	20th	First round
1993–94	5	Reg. Pref.	20th	
1994–95	6	1ª Reg.	4th	
1995–96	6	1ª Reg.	1st	
1996–97	5	Reg. Pref.	12th	
1997–98	5	Reg. Pref.	4th	
1998–99	5	Reg. Pref.	12th	
1999–2000	5	Reg. Pref.	6th	
2000–01	5	Reg. Pref.	2nd	
2001–02	5	Reg. Pref.	3rd	
2002–03	5	Reg. Pref.	2nd	
2003–04	5	Reg. Pref.	4th	
2004–05	5	Reg. Pref.	3rd	
2005–06	5	Reg. Pref.	6th	
2006–07	5	Reg. Pref.	6th	
2007–08	5	Reg. Pref.	1st	
2008–09	5	Reg. Pref.	3rd	
2009–10	5	Reg. Pref.	2nd	
2010–11	4	3ª	11th	

Season	Tier	Division	Place	Copa del Rey
2011–12	4	3ª	13th	
2012–13	4	3ª	11th	
2013–14	4	3ª	11th	
2014–15	4	3ª	11th	
2015–16	4	3ª	1st	
2016–17	3	2ª B	11th	First round
2017–18	3	2ª B	18th	
2018–19	4	3ª	4th	
2019–20	4	3ª	7th	
2020–21	4	3ª	3rd / 6th	
2021–22	5	3ª RFEF	2nd	
2022–23	4	2ª Fed.	10th	Second round
2023–24	4	2ª Fed.	14th	
2024–25	5	3ª Fed.	10th	
2025–26	5	3ª Fed.	2nd	
2026–27	5	3ª Fed.		

- 2 seasons in Segunda División B
- 2 seasons in Segunda Federación
- 26 seasons in Tercera División
- 4 seasons in Tercera Federación/Tercera División RFEF

== Current squad ==
As of 2 February 2024

Note: Flags indicate national team as defined under FIFA eligibility rules; some limited exceptions apply. Players may hold more than one non-FIFA nationality.

No.	Pos.	Nation	Player
1	GK	ESP	Salva de la Cruz
2	DF	ESP	Carles Marco
3	DF	ESP	Enrique Torrent
4	DF	ESP	Javi Pérez
5	DF	ESP	Roan Riera
6	DF	SEN	Sana N'Diaye
7	FW	ESP	Javi Sánchez
8	MF	ESP	Pedro Torres
9	MF	NED	Achraf Madi
10	FW	FRA	Jean-Paul N'Djoli (on loan from Hércules)
11	FW	ESP	Néstor Querol
12	DF	ESP	Franc Mateu

No.	Pos.	Nation	Player
13	GK	ESP	Nacho Mingol
14	FW	ESP	Guille Andrés
15	FW	ESP	José Álvarez
17	DF	ESP	Luis Navarro
18	FW	ESP	Fermín Rodríguez
19	MF	ESP	Ato
20	DF	ESP	Carlos David
21	FW	ESP	Ángel Araujo
22	GK	ESP	José Ortega
—	MF	ESP	Edu Adell
—	FW	ESP	César Díaz

== Honours ==
- Tercera División: 2015–16
- Copa Federación de España: 2016–17
