= Cortes, Navarre =

Town and municipality in northern Spain

Coordinates: 41°55′22″N 1°25′19″W

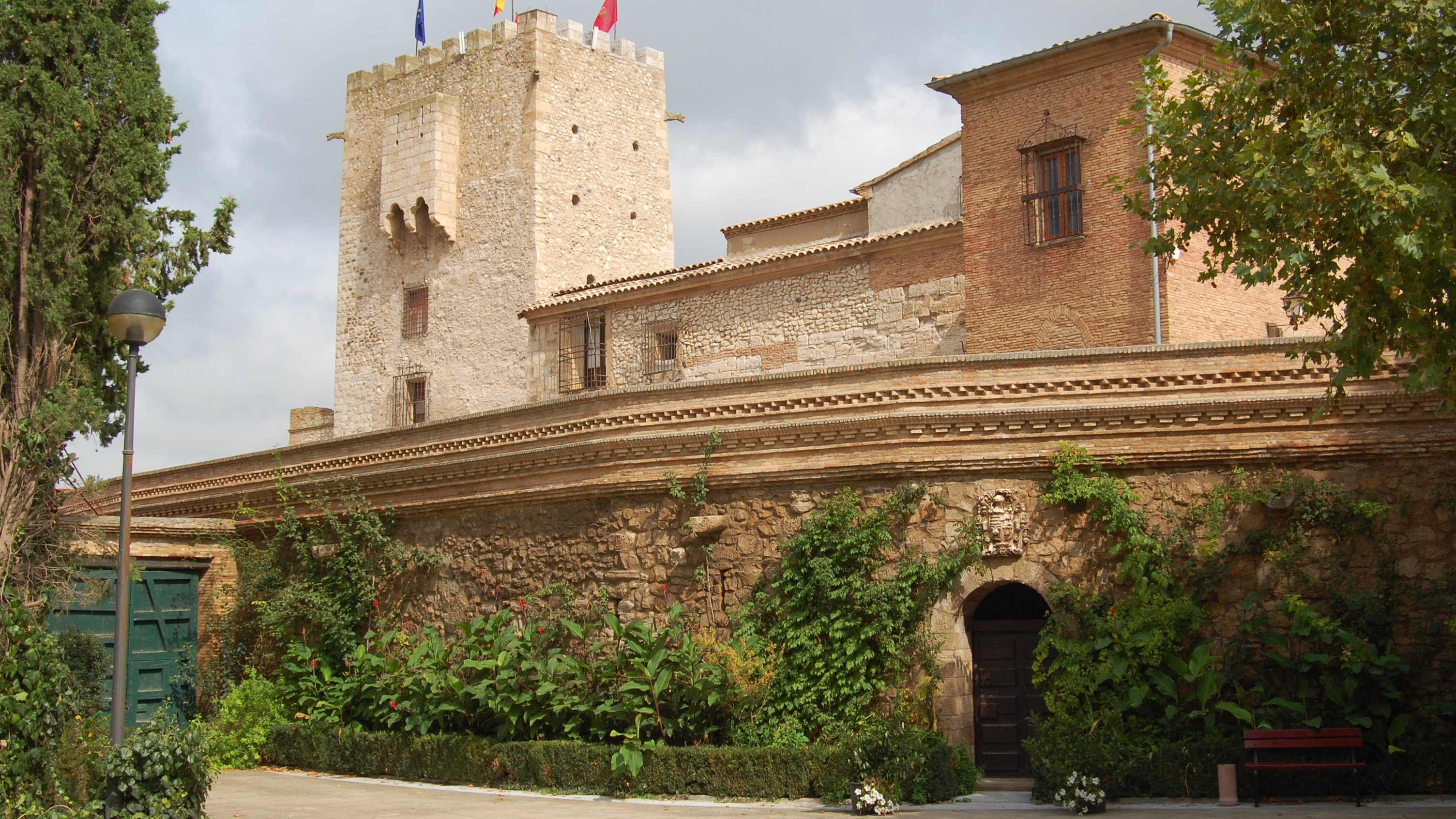
Castle of Cortes in Cortes, Navarra, Spain

Cortes's coat of arms

Cortes is a town and municipality located in the province and autonomous community of Navarre, northern Spain. It is being located right on the border with Aragon at the southernmost end of Navarre. Thus it is a southern outpost of the Historical Basque region although the area is unilingually Spanish.
