= Madridejos, Toledo =

Madridejos
- Municipality
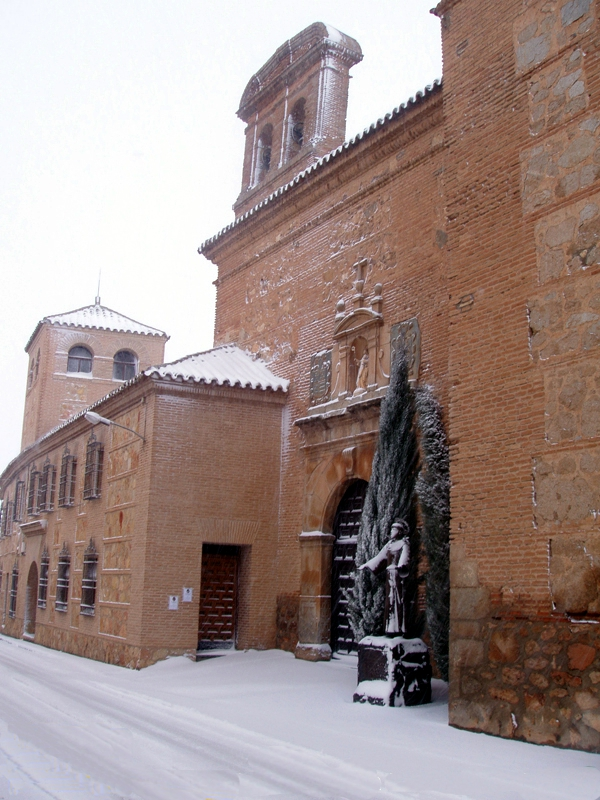
- Madridejos, Toledo

- Coat of arms

- Location within Castilla-La Mancha Location within Spain
- Coordinates: 39°28′N 3°32′W
- Country: Spain
- Autonomous community: Castile-La Mancha
- Province: Toledo
- Municipality: Madridejos

Area
  - Total: 262 km^{2} (101 sq mi)
- Elevation: 697 m (2,287 ft)

Population (2025-01-01)
  - Total: 10,088
  - Density: 38.5/km^{2} (99.7/sq mi)
- Time zone: UTC+1 (CET)
  - Summer (DST): UTC+2 (CEST)
- Website: [www.madridejos.es]

Madridejos is a municipality located in the province of Toledo, Castile-La Mancha, Spain. According to the 2011 census (INE), the municipality has a population of 11304 inhabitants.
