= CD Quintanar del Rey =

Association football club in Spain

Quintanar del Rey
- Full name: Club Deportivo Quintanar del Rey
- Founded: 1984; 42 years ago
- Stadium: San Marcos
- Capacity: 2,000
- President: Pedro Navarro Roldán
- Head coach: Pedro Bolaños
- League: Tercera Federación – Group 18
- 2025–26: Segunda Federación – Group 5, 14th of 18 (relegated)
- Website: www.quintanardeportivo.com
Home colours	Away colours

Club Deportivo Quintanar del Rey is a Spanish football team based in Quintanar del Rey, in the autonomous community of Castile-La Mancha. Founded in 1984, it plays in Tercera Federación – Group 18, holding home games at Campo Municipal San Marcos, with a capacity of 2,000 seats.

== History ==
=== Club background ===
- Athlétic Quintanar del Rey (1984–1994)
- Asociación Deportiva Quintanar del Rey (1994–1997)
- Club Deportivo Quintanar del Rey (1997–)

== Season to season ==
Season	Tier	Division	Place	Copa del Rey
1984–85	9	3ª Reg.	5th	
1985–86	9	3ª Reg.	2nd	
1986–87	6	1ª Reg.	4th	
1987–88	6	1ª Reg.	4th	
1988–89	6	1ª Reg.	2nd	
1989–90	6	1ª Reg.	5th	
1990–91	6	1ª Reg.	6th	
1991–92	6	1ª Reg.	2nd	
1992–93	6	1ª Reg.	14th	
1993–94	6	1ª Reg.	(R)	
1994–95	7	2ª Reg.	9th	
1995–96	6	1ª Aut.	7th	
1996–97	6	1ª Aut.	1st	
1997–98	5	1ª Aut.	16th	
1998–99	5	1ª Aut.	2nd	
1999–2000	4	3ª	5th	
2000–01	4	3ª	1st	
2001–02	4	3ª	4th	First round
2002–03	4	3ª	2nd	
2003–04	4	3ª	1st	

Season	Tier	Division	Place	Copa del Rey
2004–05	4	3ª	11th	First round
2005–06	4	3ª	10th	
2006–07	4	3ª	16th	
2007–08	4	3ª	17th	
2008–09	5	Aut. Pref.	1st	
2009–10	4	3ª	15th	
2010–11	4	3ª	10th	
2011–12	4	3ª	8th	
2012–13	4	3ª	9th	
2013–14	4	3ª	10th	
2014–15	4	3ª	3rd	
2015–16	4	3ª	5th	
2016–17	4	3ª	8th	
2017–18	4	3ª	16th	
2018–19	4	3ª	8th	
2019–20	4	3ª	2nd	
2020–21	4	3ª	3rd / 5th	First round
2021–22	5	3ª RFEF	2nd	
2022–23	5	3ª Fed.	3rd	
2023–24	5	3ª Fed.	5th	

Season	Tier	Division	Place	Copa del Rey
2024–25	5	3ª Fed.	1st	
2025–26	4	2ª Fed.	14th	Second round
2026-27	5	3ª Fed.		

- 1 season in Segunda Federación
- 21 seasons in Tercera División
- 5 seasons in Tercera Federación/Tercera División RFEF
