= Sangonera la Verde =

Coordinates: 37°56′N 1°12′W

Sangonera la Verde, Spain
- Interactive map of Sangonera la Verde, Spain
- Municipality: Murcia

Area
  - Total: 14.418 km^{2} (5.567 sq mi)
  - Land: 14.418 km^{2} (5.567 sq mi)

Population (2009)
  - Total: 9,648
  - Density: 64,655/km^{2} (167,460/sq mi)
- Time zone: UTC+1 (CET)
  - Summer (DST): CEST

Sangonera la Verde is a village located in the Garden of Murcia (Spain) and is placed in the south-western quarter of Murcia municipality. It has a population of 11,651 inhabitants.

== History ==
The origin of Sangonera may be related to the presence of two manors: Guill count manor and Mayayo marquesses manor. Their labourers started to build dwellings near the boundaries of both territories.

The village obtained the administrative-legal status of aldea de realengo in the 18th century and a governor named alcalde pedáneo was assigned to it.

During the Trienio Liberal Sangonera was part of El Palmar municipality since El Palmar (district of Murcia) became independent from Murcia. In 1856 this new municipality ceased existing and its territory became again part of Murcia municipality.

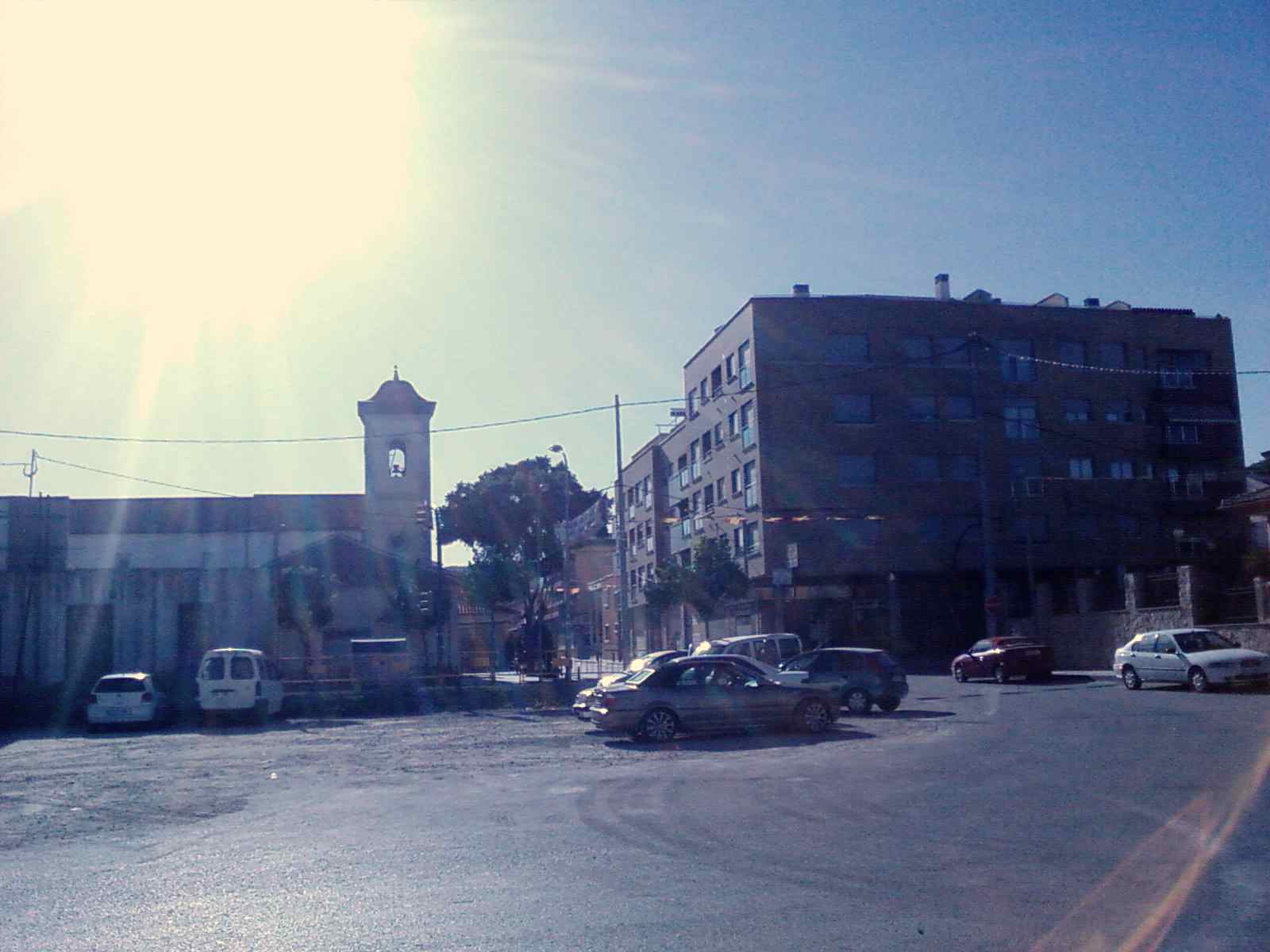
Calle de la Iglesia and a church in Sangonera la verde

== Geography ==
There are three localities in the district: Sangonera la Verde or Ermita Nueva, which is inhabited by 10,936 people; Torre Guil, where 1,157 people live; and Frondoso Valley, which is home to 183 people.

== Demographics ==
3.13% inhabitants are foreigners – 0.798% come from other countries of Europe, 0.88% are Africans, 1.19% are Americans and 30 Asian people reside in the territory. The table below shows the population trends of the 21st century by its five-year periods.

| | 2000 | 2005 | 2010 | 2015 |
|---|---|---|---|---|
| Population | 7,784 | 8,685 | 9,964 | 11,067 |

== Festivities ==
- Holy Week
- Patron saint festivity: it is devoted to Our Lady of Los Ángeles and is held in the early-August.
