= Sierra de Fuentes =

Sierra de Fuentes, Spain
- municipality
- Flag Coat of arms
- Interactive map of Sierra de Fuentes, Spain
- Coordinates: 39°26′N 6°16′W
- Country: Spain
- Autonomous community: Extremadura
- Province: Cáceres
- Municipality: Sierra de Fuentes

Area
  - Total: 25 km^{2} (9.7 sq mi)
- Elevation: 428 m (1,404 ft)

Population (2025-01-01)
  - Total: 2,081
  - Density: 83/km^{2} (220/sq mi)
- Time zone: UTC+1 (CET)
  - Summer (DST): UTC+2 (CEST)

Sierra de Fuentes is a municipality located in the province of Cáceres, Extremadura, Spain. According to the 2005 census (INE), the municipality has a population of 2358 inhabitants. Local attractions include beekeeping and wildlife rescue centres.

== See also ==
- List of municipalities in Cáceres
