= Xerez CD B =

Spanish football team

Xerez B
- logo
- Full name: Xerez Club Deportivo, S.A.D. "B"
- Founded: 1957; 2023 (refounded)
- Stadium: Pedro S. Garrido, Jerez de la Frontera, Andalusia, Spain
- Capacity: 3,579
- League: Segunda Andaluza Cádiz
- 2025–26: Segunda Andaluza Cádiz, 15th of 16
Home colours	Away colours

Xerez Club Deportivo "B" is the reserve team of Xerez CD, a Spanish football club based in Jerez de la Frontera, in the autonomous community of Andalusia. Founded in 1957, it plays in Segunda Andaluza Cádiz, holding home games at Estadio Pedro S. Garrido.

== Season to season ==
- As Xerez Balompié CF

Season	Tier	Division	Place	Copa del Rey
1957–1967	—	Regional	—	
1968–69	4	1ª Reg.	3rd	
1969–70	4	1ª Reg.	9th	
1970–71	4	1ª Reg.	20th	
1971–72	5	2ª Reg.	12th	
1972–73	5	2ª Reg.	9th	
1973–74	5	2ª Reg.	19th	
1974–75	5	2ª Reg.	8th	
1975–76	6	2ª Reg.	2nd	
1976–77	6	2ª Reg.		
1977–78	7	2ª Reg.	12th	
1978–79	7	2ª Reg.	13th	
1979–80	7	2ª Reg.	3rd	

Season	Tier	Division	Place	Copa del Rey
1980–81	7	2ª Reg.	9th	
1981–82	7	2ª Reg.	5th	
1982–83	7	2ª Reg.	7th	
1983–84	6	1ª Reg.	5th	
1984–85	6	1ª Reg.	19th	
1985–86	6	1ª Reg.	16th	
1986–87	6	1ª Reg.		
1987–88	5	Reg. Pref.	4th	
1988–89	5	Reg. Pref.	4th	
1989–90	5	Reg. Pref.	7th	
1990–91	5	Reg. Pref.	8th	
1991–92	5	Reg. Pref.	3rd	

- As Xerez CD "B"

Season	Tier	Division	Place
1992–93	5	Reg. Pref.	13th
1993–94	5	Reg. Pref.	11th
1994–95	5	Reg. Pref.	9th
1995–96	5	Reg. Pref.	8th
1996–97	5	Reg. Pref.	6th
1997–98	5	Reg. Pref.	4th
1998–99	5	Reg. Pref.	3rd
1999–2000	5	Reg. Pref.	3rd
2000–01	5	Reg. Pref.	1st
2001–02	5	Reg. Pref.	4th
2002–03	5	Reg. Pref.	6th
2003–04	5	Reg. Pref.	8th
2004–05	5	1ª And.	2nd
2005–06	4	3ª	7th
2006–07	4	3ª	16th
2007–08	4	3ª	20th
2008–09	5	1ª And.	8th
2009–10	5	1ª And.	4th
2010–11	5	1ª And.	3rd
2011–12	5	1ª And.	3rd

Season	Tier	Division	Place
2012–13	5	1ª And.	3rd
2013–14	5	1ª And.	DQ
2014–15	6	2ª And.	14th
2015–2023	DNP		
2023–24	9	3ª And.	5th
2024–25	9	3ª And.	1st
2025–26	8	2ª And.	15th
2026–27	8	2ª And.	

- 3 seasons in Tercera División
