= 2014–15 Copa Federación de España =

Copa RFEF

Tournament details
- Country: Spain
- Teams: 30 (in national phase)

Final positions
- Champions: R. Unión
- Runners-up: Castellón

Tournament statistics
- Matches played: 56
- Goals scored: 148 (2.64 per match)

The 2014–15 Copa Federación de España was the 22nd edition of the Copa Federación de España, also known as Copa RFEF, a knockout competition for Spanish football clubs in Segunda División B and Tercera División. R. Unión defeated Castellón 4–0 on aggregate in the final. R. Unión got the trophy and a cash prize of 90.152 euros and qualified for the next edition of the tournament. Castellón received a prize of 30.051 euros and losing semifinalists 12.020 euros. Each winner of an Autonomous Community tournament received a prize of 3.005 euros.

The competition began 30 July 2014 and finished 16 April 2015.

== Autonomous Communities tournaments ==
=== West Andalusia and Ceuta tournament ===
==== Semifinals ====
Team 1	Agg.	Team 2	1st leg	2nd leg
Gerena	5–4	Cabecense	4–1	1–3
Lucena	3–8	San Fernando	1–2	2–6

25 September 2014	Gerena	4–1	Cabecense	Municipal José Juan Romero Gil, Gerena, Seville
21:00	Francis Delgado 20' 38'; Chuli 30'; Álvaro Madroñal 50'		Vega 31' (pen.)

24 September 2014	Lucena	1–2	San Fernando	Ciudad Deportiva, Lucena, Córdoba
21:00	Pedro Beda 11'	Report	Ale Granado 6'; Domingo (o.g.) 67'	Attendance: 200; Referee: Montoro Garrido

1 October 2014	Cabecense	3–1	Gerena	Municipal Carlos Marchena, Las Cabezas de San Juan, Seville
20:30	Reguera 25'; Carlitos 56'; Alberto Vega 70'; Guti (penalty missed)		Kiki 84' (pen.)

1 October 2014	San Fernando	6–2	Lucena	Estadio Iberoamericano 2010, San Fernando, Cádiz
19:00	Pablo Aguilera 7'; Carballat 27'; Ñoño 38' (pen.); Gabi 53'; Maldonado 63' 89'	Report	Pedro Beda 49'; Araújo 71'

==== Final ====
Team 1	Agg.	Team 2	1st leg	2nd leg
Gerena	5–4	San Fernando	2–3	3–1

8 October 2014	Gerena	2–3	San Fernando	Municipal José Juan Romero Gil, Gerena, Seville
20:00	Jorge 48'; Francis 73'	Report	Pablo Aguilera 42'; Carballat 68'; Ñoño 69'	Referee: Ramos Ramos

15 October 2014	San Fernando	1–3	Gerena	Estadio Iberoamericano 2010, San Fernando, Cádiz
21:00	Chapi 57'; Ñoño (penalty missed)	Report	Tano 4' 7'; Gabi (o.g.) 16'	Attendance: 400; Referee: Hidalgo Márquez

=== East Andalusia and Melilla tournament ===
==== Semifinals ====
Team 1	Agg.	Team 2	1st leg	2nd leg
Linares	4–2	Loja	3–0	1–2
Almería B	2–3	Granada B	1–3	1–0

24 September 2014	Linares	3–0	Loja	Linarejos, Linares, Jaén
20:45	Ángel 45'; Carles 64'; Manu Castillo 68'	Report		Attendance: 700; Referee: Alcalá González

24 September 2014	Almería B	1–3	Granada B	Anexo Juegos del Mediterráneo, Almería
17:00	Rubén Díaz 26'	Report	Huerta 38'; Mercado 47'; Canillas 81'	Attendance: 100; Referee: Moreno Muñoz

1 October 2014	Loja	2–1	Linares	Medina Lauxa, Loja, Granada
20:30	Brazalez 22'; Gallego 87'		Garrido 11'

1 October 2014	Granada B	0–1	Almería B	Complejo Deportivo Núñez Blanca, Granada
17:00		Report	Rubén 25' (penalty missed)	Attendance: 100; Referee: Montijano Linde

==== Final ====
Team 1	Agg.	Team 2	1st leg	2nd leg
Granada B	2–3	Linares	2–0	0–3

8 October 2014	Granada B	2–0	Linares	Complejo Deportivo Núñez Blanca, Granada
17:00	Luizinho 10' 68'	Report		Attendance: 200; Referee: Crispín Mayorga

15 October 2014	Linares	3–0	Granada B	Linarejos, Linares, Jaén
20:45	Manu Castillo 5'; Quesada 30'; Carles 75' (pen.)	Report		Attendance: 800; Referee: Castro Soriano

=== Aragon tournament ===
==== Quarter-finals ====
Team 1	Score	Team 2
Almudévar	1–1 (4–3 p)	Sariñena
Barbastro	1–1 (4–1 p)	At. Monzón
Borja	0–0 (3–4 p)	Tarazona
Ejea	0–2	Zaragoza B

10 August 2014	Almudévar	1–1 (4–3 p)	Sariñena	La Corona, Almudévar, Huesca
19:00	Álex 60'		Matías 79'

10 August 2014	Barbastro	1–1 (4–1 p)	At. Monzón	Municipal, Barbastro, Huesca
19:00	Fernández 80'		Josan Suárez 47'

10 August 2014	Borja	0–0 (3–4 p)	Tarazona	Manuel Meler, Borja, Zaragoza
19:00

9 August 2014	Ejea	0–2	Zaragoza B	Municipal, Ejea de los Caballeros, Zaragoza
20:00		Report	Pablo Moreno 10', 17'	Referee: Mouhamed N´Diaye

==== Semifinals ====
Team 1	Score	Team 2
Zaragoza B	3–1	Tarazona
Almudévar	3–1	Barbastro

17 August 2014	Zaragoza B	3–1	Tarazona	Ciudad Deportiva, Zaragoza
11:30	Diego Suárez 43' (pen.); Daniel Lasure 48'; Gabarre 90'		Petro 74'

17 August 2014	Almudévar	3–1	Barbastro	La Corona, Almudévar, Huesca
18:30	Álex 55'; Suso 59', 74'	Report	Bana 61'

==== Final ====
Team 1	Score	Team 2
Zaragoza B	1–2	Almudévar

24 September	Zaragoza B	1–2	Almudévar	Ciudad Deportiva, Zaragoza
18:30	Pombo 77'	Report	Nacho (penalty missed) 75'; Antonio de Pablo 64'	Attendance: 500; Referee: Ramo Andrés

=== Asturias tournament ===
==== Qualifying tournament ====
===== Group A =====
Team	Pld	W	D	L	GF	GA	GD	Pts	SPB	OVB	COV
Sporting B	4	2	1	1	8	5	+3	7		3–0	2–0
Oviedo B	4	1	2	1	4	5	−1	5	3–1		0–0
Covadonga	4	0	3	1	3	5	−2	3	2–2	1–1	

30 July 2014	Sporting B	3–0	Oviedo B	Gijón
19:00	Álex García 33'; Mera 59'; Guitián 75'	Report		Stadium: Mareo; Attendance: 650; Referee: Fernández Buergo

3 August 2014	Oviedo B	0–0	Covadonga	Oviedo
12:00		Report		Stadium: Instalaciones Tensi; Attendance: 250; Referee: González Suárez

6 August 2014	Covadonga	2–2	Sporting B	Oviedo
20:00	José Luis 43'; Diego 66'	Report	Tato 2'; Álvaro 52'	Stadium: Juan Antonio Álvarez Rabanal; Attendance: 125; Referee: Nieto Martínez

10 August 2014	Oviedo B	3–1	Sporting B	Oviedo
12:00	David González 2'; Diegui 65'; Kaná 82'	Report	Álex García 55'	Stadium: El Requexón; Attendance: 200; Referee: González González

13 August 2014	Covadonga	1–1	Oviedo B	Oviedo
20:00	Jaime 33' (pen.)	Report	David González 50'	Stadium: Juan Antonio Álvarez Rabanal; Attendance: 250; Referee: Morís Martínez

17 August 2014	Sporting B	2–0	Covadonga	Gijón
12:00	Guille Donoso 17', 48'	Report		Stadium: Mareo; Attendance: 200; Referee: Baniela García

===== Group B =====
Team	Pld	W	D	L	GF	GA	GD	Pts	CAU	ENT	AVB
Caudal	4	2	1	1	4	2	+2	7		3–1	1–0
L'Entregu	4	2	1	1	4	4	0	7	0–0		1–0
Avilés B	4	1	0	3	2	4	−2	3	1–0	1–2	

30 July 2014	Caudal	1–0	Avilés B	Mieres
20:00	Jano 94'	Report		Stadium: Hermanos Antuña; Attendance: 150; Referee: Cano Fernández

3 August 2014	Avilés B	1–2	L'Entregu	Avilés
12:00	Omar Fernández 65'	Report	Omar 5', 17'	Stadium: Muro de Zaro; Attendance: 100; Referee: Valdés Díaz

6 August 2014	L'Entregu	0–0	Caudal	El Entrego
19:30		Report		Stadium: Nuevo Nalón; Attendance: 150; Referee: Corujo Morán

10 August 2014	Avilés B	1–0	Caudal	Avilés
12:00	Wisy 58'	Report		Stadium: Muro de Zaro; Attendance: 100; Referee: Muñoz Suárez

13 August 2014	L'Entregu	1–0	Avilés B	El Entrego
19:30	San Eloy 30'	Report		Stadium: Nuevo Nalón; Attendance: 150; Referee: Farto García

17 August 2014	Caudal	3–1	L'Entregu	Mieres
19:00	Óscar Pérez 48'; David 68'; Damián 92'	Report	Borja Noval 61' (pen.)	Stadium: Hermanos Antuña; Attendance: 250; Referee: López Abelleira

===== Group C =====
Team	Pld	W	D	L	GF	GA	GD	Pts	URR	CEA	PRA
Urraca	4	3	0	1	8	2	+6	9		3–1	3–0
Ceares	4	3	0	1	4	3	+1	9	1–0		1–0
Praviano	4	0	0	4	0	7	−7	0	0–2	0–1	

30 July 2014	Ceares	1–0	Urraca	Gijón
19:15	Ponte 56'	Report		Stadium: La Cruz; Attendance: 300; Referee: Fernández Fernández

2 August 2014	Urraca	3–0	Praviano	Posada de Llanes
19:45	Ramonín 52'; Chamorro 59'; Marcos Iglesias 75'	Report		Stadium: La Corredoria; Attendance: 175; Referee: Romero García

6 August 2014	Praviano	0–1	Ceares	Pravia
19:00		Report	Ponte 25'	Stadium: Santa Catalina; Attendance: 150; Referee: Cruzado Vicente

10 August 2014	Urraca	3–1	Ceares	Posada de Llanes
19:00	Ramonín 33', 43'; Marcos Iglesias 77'	Report	Jorge 78'	Stadium: La Corredoria; Attendance: 350; Referee: Mata Areces

13 August 2014	Praviano	0–2	Urraca	Pravia
18:45		Report	Riki 76', 81'	Stadium: Santa Catalina; Attendance: 150; Referee: Rojas Pineda

17 August 2014	Ceares	1–0	Praviano	Gijón
18:45	Jimmy 70'	Report		Stadium: La Cruz; Attendance: 150; Referee: Rodríguez García

===== Group D =====
Team	Pld	W	D	L	GF	GA	GD	Pts	LAN	TUI	CON
Langreo	4	1	2	1	6	5	+1	5		2–0	0–0
Tuilla	4	1	2	1	6	5	+1	5	2–2		4–1
Condal	4	1	2	1	4	6	−2	5	3–2	0–0	

30 July 2014	Langreo	0–0	Condal	Langreo
20:00		Report		Stadium: Ganzábal; Attendance: 360; Referee: Quirós Pérez

2 August 2014	Condal	0–0	Tuilla	Noreña
19:15		Report		Stadium: Alejandro Ortea; Attendance: 225; Referee: Pérez Rato

6 August 2014	Tuilla	2–2	Langreo	Tuilla, Langreo
20:00	Villa 8'; Pablo Díaz 52'	Report	Nacho Méndez 9', 22'	Stadium: El Candín; Attendance: 300; Referee: Menéndez Riestra

9 August 2014	Condal	3–2	Langreo	Noreña
19:00	Rueda 29' (pen.); Juanín 50'; Mori 88'	Report	Otero 33'; Calvillo 64'	Stadium: Alejandro Ortea; Attendance: 200; Referee: Delgado Fernández

13 August 2014	Tuilla	4–1	Condal	Tuilla, Langreo
20:00	Alonso 45'; Mori 55'; Pelayo Roces 62'; Trabanco 80'	Report	Mori 48'	Stadium: El Candín; Attendance: 300; Referee: Iglesias Hortal

17 August 2014	Langreo	2–0	Tuilla	Langreo
20:00	Nacho Calvillo 37'; Pablo Acebal 63' (pen.)	Report		Stadium: Ganzábal; Attendance: 600; Referee: Bermejo Ferrero

==== Semifinals ====
Team 1	Agg.	Team 2	1st leg	2nd leg
Sporting B	1–0	Caudal	1–0	0–0
Urraca	4–5	Langreo	2–4	2–1

11 September 2014	Sporting B	1–0	Caudal	Mareo, Gijón
17:00	Dani Ndi 62'	Report		Attendance: 300; Referee: López Abelleira

11 September 2014	Urraca	2–4	Langreo	La Corredoria, Posada de Llanes
20:00	Marcos Iglesias 42'; Víctor 70'	Report	Pablo Acebal 10'; Joaquín 41'; Nacho Méndez 57'; Ortiz 82'	Attendance: 350; Referee: Iglesias Hortal

18 September 2014	Caudal	0–0	Sporting B	Hermanos Antuña, Mieres
20:00		Report		Attendance: 300; Referee: Baniela García

18 September 2014	Langreo	1–2	Urraca	Langreo
19:30	Ortiz 60'	Report	Langarica 15'; Pablo Díaz 73'	Stadium: Ganzábal; Attendance: 391; Referee: Mata Areces

==== Final ====
Team 1	Score	Team 2
Sporting B	2–2 (a.e.t.) (8–7 p)	Langreo

- Neutral venue

16 October 2014	Sporting B	2–2 (a.e.t.) (8–7 p)	Langreo	La Corredoria, Posada de Llanes
19:30	Esteban (o.g.) 1'; Guille Donoso 27'		Pablo Acebal 32' (pen.); Pablo Álvarez 36'	Attendance: 450; Referee: Granda Barros

=== Balearic Islands tournament ===
==== First round ====
Team 1	Agg.	Team 2	1st leg	2nd leg
Llosetense	3–3 (a)	Binissalem	2–2	1–1
Constància	2–4	Poblense	2–2	0–2

Mercadal and Formentera received a bye.

3 September 2014	Llosetense	2–2	Binissalem	Municipal, Lloseta, Majorca
19:00	Eduardo Moral 43'; Joan Calderón 83'		Miguel Forteza 37'; Juan Salva 79'

3 September 2014	Constància	2–2	Poblense	Nou Camp, Inca, Spain, Majorca
19:30	Sergio Olmeda 31'; Víctor Martínez 64'		Martí Noceras 10' (pen.); Jaume Pou 45'

10 September 2014	Binissalem	1–1	Llosetense	Miquel Pons, Binissalem, Majorca
19:30	Jaume Pol 39'		Sergi Rojals 73' (pen.)	Referee: Creus Rodríguez

10 September 2014	Poblense	2–0	Constància	Nou Camp, Sa Pobla, Majorca
19:30	Jaume Pou 40' 90'			Referee: Albiol González

==== Semifinals ====
Team 1	Agg.	Team 2	1st leg	2nd leg
Poblense	1–4	Binissalem	0–2	1–2
Mercadal	1–1 (4–3 p)	Formentera	1–0	0–1

17 September 2014	Poblense	0–2	Binissalem	Nou Camp, Sa Pobla, Majorca
19:30			Forteza 55'; Salva 65'

17 September 2014	Mercadal	1–0	Formentera	Sant Martí, Es Mercadal, Menorca
17:00	Xisco 84'

24 September 2014	Binissalem	2–1	Poblense	Miquel Pons, Binissalem, Majorca
19:30	Moya 45' 70'	Report	Chus 72'

24 September 2014	Formentera	1–0 (3–4 p)	Mercadal	Municipal, Sant Francesc Xavier, Formentera
16:00	Górriz 17'; Pepe Bernal (penalty missed)	Report		Attendance: 150; Referee: Candel Cabrera

==== Final ====
Team 1	Agg.	Team 2	1st leg	2nd leg
Binissalem	1–3	Mercadal	0–0	1–3

1 October 2014	Binissalem	0–0	Mercadal	Miquel Pons, Binissalem, Majorca
18:45	Salvà (penalty missed)	Report	Toni Fedelich (penalty missed)	Referee: Rodríguez Quintero

8 October 2014	Mercadal	3–1	Binissalem	Sant Martí, Es Mercadal, Menorca
18:00	David Mas 9'; Javi Lacueva 46' 62'; Joel (penalty missed)	Report	Salvà 36'

=== Basque Country tournament ===
==== First round ====
Team 1	Agg.	Team 2	1st leg	2nd leg
Zalla	1–2	Gernika	1–2	0–0
Balmaseda	2–3	R. Unión	0–3	2–0
Alavés B	2–3 (a.e.t.)	Aurrerá	1–1	1–2

Berio received a bye

16 September 2014	Zalla	1–2	Gernika	Landaberri, Zalla, Biscay
20:00			Sergio Pascual; Zarrabeitia

17 September 2014	Balmaseda	0–3	R. Unión	La Baluga, Balmaseda, Biscay
18:00			Silas 15' 59'; Goikoetxea 81'

17 September 2014	Alavés B	1–1	Aurrerá	José Luis Compañón, Vitoria-Gasteiz, Álava
18:30

1 October 2014	Gernika	0–0	Zalla	Urbieta, Gernika, Biscay
19:30

1 October 2014	R. Unión	0–2	Balmaseda	Gal, Irún, Gipuzkoa
19:00		Report	Tena (o.g.) 56'; Aitor 58'	Referee: Morales Hernando

1 October 2014	Aurrerá	2–1 (a.e.t.)	Alavés B	Olaranbe, Vitoria-Gasteiz, Álava
19:00

==== Semifinals ====
Team 1	Agg.	Team 2	1st leg	2nd leg
Berio	2–2 (a)	Gernika	2–2	0–0
R. Unión	4–0	Aurrerá	3–0	1–0

8 October 2014	Berio	2–2	Gernika	Zubieta, Lasarte-Oria, Gipuzkoa
19:30

8 October 2014	R. Unión	3–0	Aurrerá	Gal, Irún, Gipuzkoa
19:00	Mikel Alonso 28'; Goikoetxea 36' (pen.); Urbieta 55'	Report		Attendance: 200

15 October 2014	Gernika	0–0	Berio	Urbieta, Gernika, Biscay
19:30

15 October 2014	Aurrerá	0–1	R. Unión	Olaranbe, Vitoria-Gasteiz, Álava
19:00			Silas

==== Final ====
Team 1	Agg.	Team 2	1st leg	2nd leg
Gernika	1–3	R. Unión	1–1	0–2

22 October 2014	Gernika	1–1	R. Unión	Urbieta, Gernika, Biscay
19:30	Sergio 51'		Urbieta 58'

29 October 2014	R. Unión	2–0	Gernika	Gal, Irún, Gipuzkoa
19:00	Ozkoidi 40'; Saizar 85'	Report

=== Canary Islands tournament ===
==== Semifinals ====
Team 1	Agg.	Team 2	1st leg	2nd leg
Mensajero	w.o.	Unión Viera	-	-
At. Victoria	4–5	Tenerife B	4–2	0–3

24 September 2014	At. Victoria	4–2	Tenerife B	Municipal, La Victoria de Acentejo, Tenerife
21:00

1 October 2014	Tenerife B	3–0	At. Victoria	Ciudad Deportiva, Santa Cruz de Tenerife, Tenerife
21:00	Nayib; Franco; Cristo Díaz

==== Final ====
Team 1	Agg.	Team 2	1st leg	2nd leg
Unión Viera	4–3	Tenerife B	2–2	2–1

15 October 2014	Unión Viera	2–2	Tenerife B	Alfonso Silva, Las Palmas, Gran Canaria
17:00	Cesáreo 49'; Dailos 53' (pen.)	Report	Nayib 22'; Federico 72'	Referee: Sosa Gómez

22 October 2014	Tenerife B	1–2	Unión Viera	Ciudad Deportiva, Santa Cruz de Tenerife, Tenerife
16:30	Federico 7'	Report	Peraza 55' 57'

=== Cantabria tournament ===
==== Quarter-finals ====
Team 1	Score	Team 2
Rayo Cantabria	0–1	Cayón
Laredo	2–0	Gama
Tropezón	3–0	Racing Santander B
Escobedo	1–1 (3–1 p)	Siete Villas

- All matches in Castillo Siete Villas.

15 August 2014	Rayo Cantabria	0–1	Cayón	San Pedro, Castillo, Arnuero
17:30		Report	Óscar 4'	Referee: Iglesias Gutiérrez

15 August 2014	Laredo	2–0	Gama	San Pedro, Castillo, Arnuero
20:00	Camino 86'; Bubu 90+2'			Referee: Gutiérrez Zubizarreta

16 August 2014	Tropezón	3–0	Racing Santander B	San Pedro, Castillo, Arnuero
17:30	Sota 18'; Álex 30' 49'

16 August 2014	Escobedo	1–1 (3–1 p)	Siete Villas	San Pedro, Castillo, Arnuero
20:00	David 9'		Carlitos 23'

==== Semifinals ====
Team 1	Score	Team 2
Cayón	1–2	Laredo
Tropezón	3–1	Escobedo

- All matches in Castillo Siete Villas.

17 August 2014	Cayón	1–2	Laredo	San Pedro, Castillo, Arnuero
17:30	Cobo 80'	Report	Vinatea 12'; Bubu 24'

17 August 2014	Tropezón	3–1	Escobedo	San Pedro, Castillo, Arnuero
20:00	Álex 9'; Perujo 51'; Luis González 63'		Óscar 47'

==== Final ====
Team 1	Score	Team 2
Laredo	2–3	Tropezón

- Neutral venue

9 September 2014	Laredo	2–3	Tropezón	El Sardinero, Santander
20:30	Bubu 36' (pen.); Vinatea 47'		Luis González 25'; Estrada 42'; Rafa 58'

=== Castile and León tournament ===
Team	Pld	W	D	L	GF	GA	GD	Pts
Arandina (A)	2	1	1	0	3	2	+1	4
Burgos	2	1	0	1	2	2	0	3
Palencia	2	0	1	1	1	2	−1	1

(A) Advance to a further round

Team 1	Score	Team 2
Arandina	2–1	Burgos
Burgos	1–0	Palencia
Palencia	1–1	Arandina

17 September 2014	Arandina	2–1	Burgos	El Montecillo, Aranda de Duero, Burgos
18:00	David Álvarez 26' (pen.); Alberto Mato 88'		Manu Torres 69'

2 October 2014	Burgos	1–0	Palencia	El Plantío, Burgos
20:30	Gabri 48'

15 October 2014	Palencia	1–1	Arandina	La Balastera, Palencia
20:30	César Simón 68'	Report	Borja 13'	Attendance: 200; Referee: Becerril Gómez

=== Castile-La Mancha tournament ===
==== Semifinals ====
Team 1	Agg.	Team 2	1st leg	2nd leg
Quintanar del Rey	w.o.	Almansa	-	-
Almagro	3–4	Conquense	2–1	1–3

13 August 2014	Quintanar del Rey	w.o.	Almansa	San Marcos, Quintanar del Rey, Cuenca
		Report

13 August 2014	Almagro	2–1	Conquense	Manuel Trujillo, Almagro, Ciudad Real
20:30	Salva 61'; Santi 74'		Pituli 44'

19 August 2014	Conquense	3–1	Almagro	Nueva Fuensanta, Cuenca
18:30	Borja Hernández 36', 84'; Omar 68'	Report	Jesús 63'

==== Final ====
Team 1	Agg.	Team 2	1st leg	2nd leg
Quintanar del Rey	1–3	Conquense	1–2	0–1

24 September 2014	Quintanar del Rey	1–2	Conquense	San Marcos, Quintanar del Rey, Cuenca
20:00	Cholilla 59'	Report	Denis 49'; Curro Vacas 90' (pen.)	Attendance: 100; Referee: Burillo Naranjo

8 October 2014	Conquense	1–0	Quintanar del Rey	Nueva Fuensanta, Cuenca
16:30	Borja Hernández 80' (pen.)	Report		Attendance: 200; Referee: Marchante Flores

=== Catalonia tournament ===
==== Semifinals ====
Team 1	Score	Team 2
Prat	1–0	Sant Andreu
Montañesa	2–1	Badalona

15 October 2014	Prat	1–0	Sant Andreu	Sagnier, El Prat, Barcelona
20:45	Sascha 55'	Report		Attendance: 300; Referee: Martín Varas

15 October 2014	Montañesa	2–1	Badalona	Nou Barris, Barcelona
20:00	Masip 35'; Raúl Rodríguez 50'		Raúl Torres 86'

==== Final ====
Team 1	Score	Team 2
Prat	2–1	Montañesa

22 October 2014	Prat	2–1	Montañesa	Sagnier, El Prat, Barcelona
19:30	Oriol Molins 70'; Ferri 81'		Joshua 34' (pen.)

=== Extremadura tournament ===
==== First round ====
Team 1	Score	Team 2
Moralo	0–1	Plasencia
Valdivia	0–1	Cacereño
Jerez	3–3 (p)	Díter Zafra
Sanvicenteño	1–2	Arroyo

At. San José received a bye.

27 August 2014	Moralo	0–1	Plasencia	Municipal, Navalmoral de la Mata, Cáceres
21:00			Barbero 40'

27 August 2014	Valdivia	0–1	Cacereño	Primero de Mayo, Valdivia, Villanueva de la Serena, Badajoz
20:00			Plata 62'

27 August 2014	Jerez	3–3 (a.e.t.) (– p)	Díter Zafra	Ciudad Deportiva, Jerez de los Caballeros, Badajoz
21:00	75'; 95'; 115'		Javi Martín 72'; Ruby 104' 114'

27 August 2014	Sanvicenteño	1–2	Arroyo	Ciudad Deportiva, San Vicente de Alcántara, Badajoz
21:00	Morro 62'		Carlos Carrasco 44'; Armero 89' (pen.)

==== Second round ====
Team 1	Score	Team 2
Plasencia	1–1 (p)	Cacereño
At. San José	1–1 (p)	Jerez

Arroyo received a bye.

3 September 2014	Plasencia	1–1 (a.e.t.) (5–3 p)	Cacereño	Municipal, Plasencia, Cáceres
21:00	Barbero 45'	Report	Elías Pérez 59'

3 September 2014	At. San José	1–1 (a.e.t.) (4–2 p)	Jerez	Francisco de la Hera, Almendralejo, Badajoz
21:00	Víctor 75'		Víctor Aguinaco 60'

==== Semifinal ====
Team 1	Score	Team 2
At. San José	0–7	Arroyo

Plasencia received a bye.

10 September 2014	At. San José	0–7	Arroyo	Francisco de la Hera, Almendralejo, Badajoz
21:00			Mauro 1' 40'; Fran Minaya 13'; Chori 26' 65'; Carlos Carrasco 36'; Francis (o.g.) 85'

==== Final ====
Team 1	Score	Team 2
Plasencia	1–3	Arroyo

- Neutral venue

8 October 2014	Plasencia	1–3	Arroyo	Municipal, Calamonte, Badajoz
20:30	Alan Perlaza 16'	Report	Mauro 45'; Rojas 47'; Carlos Carrasco 75'

=== Galicia tournament ===
==== First round ====
Team 1	Score	Team 2
Compostela	1–2	Órdenes
Cultural Areas	0–1	Coruxo

Alondras, Barbadás, Boiro, Cerceda, Pontevedra and Rápido de Bouzas received a bye.

24 September 2014	Compostela	1–2	Órdenes	San Lázaro, Santiago de Compostela, A Coruña
20:00	Quim Araujo 28'	Report	Álex Castro 82' (pen.); Ángel Cao 87'

24 September 2014	Cultural Areas	0–1	Coruxo	A Lomba, Ponteareas, Pontevedra
21:00		Report	Ben Fisk 68'

==== Second round ====
Team 1	Score	Team 2
Cerceda	1–2	Órdenes
Rápido de Bouzas	0–4	Coruxo
Alondras	0–0 (3–4 p)	Barbadás
Pontevedra	0–1	Boiro

7 October 2014	Cerceda	1–2	Órdenes	O Roxo, Cerceda, A Coruña
20:30	Bilal 9'	Report	Chiño 32' 52'	Referee: García Rodríguez

8 October 2014	Rápido de Bouzas	0–4	Coruxo	Baltasar Pujales, Bouzas (Vigo), Pontevedra
20:30		Report	Cristóbal 71' (pen.); Salinas 80' 83'; David Castro (o.g.) 86'	Referee: García Lesta

9 October 2014	Alondras	0–0 (3–4 p)	Barbadás	Morrazo, Cangas do Morrazo, Pontevedra
20:00		Report		Referee: Arias Pena

8 October 2014	Pontevedra	0–1	Boiro	Pasarón, Pontevedra
20:30		Report	Kevin Levis 60'	Attendance: 250; Referee: Extremadura Hernández

==== Semifinals ====
Team 1	Score	Team 2
Boiro	1–0	Órdenes
Barbadás	1–2	Coruxo

15 October 2014	Boiro	1–0	Órdenes	Vista Alegre, Boiro, A Coruña
21:00	Adrián Armental 52'	Report

16 October 2014	Barbadás	1–2	Coruxo	Os Carrís, Barbadás, Ourense
20:15	Rubén Arce 27'	Report	Óscar Pardavila 3'; Pedro Vázquez 33'	Attendance: 500; Referee: Álex Mazaira

==== Final ====
Team 1	Score	Team 2
Boiro	3–1	Coruxo

- Neutral venue

23 October 2014	Boiro	3–1	Coruxo	San Lázaro, Noia, A Coruña
20:15	Kevin Levis 3'; Adrián Armental 6'; Añón 73'		Rafa Mella 60'	Referee: Pérez Prado

=== La Rioja tournament ===
==== Semifinals ====
Team 1	Score	Team 2
SD Logroñés	1–1 (5–4 p)	Oyonesa
Calahorra	0–0 (4–5 p)	Haro

17 August 2014	SD Logroñés	1–1 (5–4 p)	Oyonesa	Las Gaunas, Logroño
18:30	Candelas 41'		Del Campo 85'

17 August 2014	Calahorra	0–0 (4–5 p)	Haro	La Planilla, Calahorra
18:00

==== Final ====
Team 1	Score	Team 2
SD Logroñés	0–0 (2–4 p)	Haro

27 August 2014	SD Logroñés	0–0 (2–4 p)	Haro	Mundial 82, Logroño
20:00

=== Madrid tournament ===
==== Final ====
Team 1	Agg.	Team 2	1st leg	2nd leg
Móstoles	2–1	At. Pinto	1–1	1–0

10 September 2014	Móstoles	1–1	At. Pinto	El Soto, Móstoles
20:30	Aguilar 45' (pen.)		Edu 49'

25 September 2014	At. Pinto	0–1	Móstoles	Amelia del Castillo, Pinto
20:30		Report	Juan Carlos 70'	Attendance: 150; Referee: Carralero Calvo

=== Murcia tournament ===
==== First round ====
Team 1	Agg.	Team 2	1st leg	2nd leg
Yeclano	5–2	Jumilla	1–2	4–0
Pinatar	3–3 (a)*	Cartagena FC	1–1	2–2
Plus Ultra	1–2	Fortuna	0–0	1–2
Molina	1–5	Palmar	1–4	0–1

- Cartagena FC qualified because Pinatar fielded an ineligible player.

24 September 2014	Yeclano	1–2	Jumilla	La Constitución, Yecla
20:30	Tomi 6'		Elías 5'; Gonzalo Guardiola 52'

24 September 2014	Pinatar	1–1	Cartagena FC	Pinatar Arena, San Pedro del Pinatar
20:00	Manu Costa 11' (pen.)	Report	Seve 10'	Attendance: 100; Referee: Luna Martínez

24 September 2014	Plus Ultra	0–0	Fortuna	Municipal, Llano de Brujas, Murcia
21:00

24 September 2014	Molina	1–4	Palmar	Sánchez Cánovas, Molina de Segura
21:00			Costa; Salinas; David; Carrión

1 October 2014	Jumilla	0–4	Yeclano	La Hoya, Jumilla
20:30		Report	Pascui 12'; Rafa López 32'; Tonete 87'; Sánchez 90'	Attendance: 300; Referee: Villalba Gabaldón

1 October 2014	Cartagena FC	2–2	Pinatar	Roldán, Torre-Pacheco
20:00	Mouchine 11'; Andrés Alonso 53' (pen.)		Momprevil 9'; Nelson 35'

1 October 2014	Fortuna	2–1	Plus Ultra	El Saladar, Fortuna
20:30	Pepe Ramírez 90+4'		Fenoll 11' (pen.)

1 October 2014	Palmar	1–0	Molina	Polideportivo, El Palmar, Murcia
21:00

==== Semifinals ====
Team 1	Agg.	Team 2	1st leg	2nd leg
Yeclano	1–3	Cartagena FC	0–1	1–2
Fortuna	1–3	Palmar	0–1	1–2

8 October 2014	Yeclano	0–1	Cartagena FC	La Constitución, Yecla
20:30		Report	Ketchu 23'	Attendance: 100; Referee: Gil Gallego

8 October 2014	Fortuna	0–1	Palmar	El Saladar, Fortuna
20:30			Daniel Carrión 29'	Referee: Martínez Montalbán

15 October 2014	Cartagena FC	2–1	Yeclano	Cartagonova, Cartagena
19:30	Álex Marín 81'; Ñiles 89'	Report	Javi Bernal 55'

15 October 2014	Palmar	2–1	Fortuna	Polideportivo, El Palmar, Murcia
21:00	78'; 89'		Pelé 67'

==== Final ====
Team 1	Score	Team 2
Cartagena FC	4–1	Palmar

- Neutral venue

23 October 2014	Cartagena FC	4–1	Palmar	Pitín, San Javier
20:00	Álex Marín 23'; Ketchu 61' (pen.); Seve Utrera 83' 86'	Report	Carlos 52'	Attendance: 1.000; Referee: Gea Penalva

=== Navarre tournament ===
==== Qualifying tournament ====
Group A

Team	Pld	W	D	L	GF	GA	GD	Pts
Osasuna B (A)	2	2	0	0	3	1	+2	6
Peña Sport	2	1	0	1	6	4	+2	3
Valle de Egüés	2	0	0	2	2	6	−4	0

(A) Advance to a further round

Team 1	Score	Team 2
Osasuna B	2–1	Peña Sport
Peña Sport	5–2	Valle de Egüés
Osasuna B	1–0	Valle de Egüés

5 August 2014	Osasuna B	2–1	Peña Sport	Tajonar, Pamplona
19:00	Miguel Díaz 27'; Álex Berenguer 52'		Barace 75'

12 August 2014	Peña Sport	5–2	Valle de Egüés	San Francisco, Tafalla
19:00	Lucea 26'; Barace 31'; Xabi Calvo 53'; Toni 80' (pen.); Maeztu 82'		Anass 7'; Imanol 23'

19 August 2014	Osasuna B	1–0	Valle de Egüés	Tajonar, Pamplona
19:00	Olavide 16'

Group B

Team	Pld	W	D	L	GF	GA	GD	Pts
Mutilvera (A)	2	1	1	0	2	1	+1	4
Idoya	2	0	2	0	1	1	0	2
Subiza	2	0	1	1	2	3	−1	1

(A) Advance to a further round

Team 1	Score	Team 2
Mutilvera	2–1	Subiza
Subiza	1–1	Idoya
Idoya	0–0	Mutilvera

5 August 2014	Mutilvera	2–1	CD Subiza	Valle Aranguren, Mutilva Baja, Aranguren
20:15	3'; Casado 27'		(pen.) 87'

13 August 2014	Subiza	1–1	Idoya	Sotoburu, Subiza
19:15

19 August 2014	Idoya	0–0	Mutilvera	Iturtxipia, Oteiza
19:00

Group C

Team	Pld	W	D	L	GF	GA	GD	Pts
Itaroa Huarte (A)	2	2	0	0	2	0	+2	6
Valtierrano	2	1	0	1	2	2	0	3
Pamplona	2	0	0	2	1	3	−2	0

(A) Advance to a further round

Team 1	Score	Team 2
Pamplona	1–2	Valtierrano
Itaroa Huarte	1–0	Pamplona
Valtierrano	0–1	Itaroa Huarte

5 August 2014	Pamplona	1–2	Valtierrano	Lizasoain, Pamplona
20:00			Carlos Marco; Aitor Montori

12 August 2014	Itaroa Huarte	1–0	Pamplona	Areta, Huarte
20:00	Rípodas

19 August 2014	Valtierrano	0–1	Itaroa Huarte	Las Tejerías, Valtierra
20:00

Group D

Team	Pld	W	D	L	GF	GA	GD	Pts
Burladés (A)	2	1	1	0	3	0	+3	4
Chantrea	2	1	0	1	2	3	−1	3
Iruña	2	0	1	1	0	2	−2	1

(A) Advance to a further round

Team 1	Score	Team 2
Burladés	3–0	Chantrea
Chantrea	2–0	Iruña
Iruña	0–0	Burladés

8 August 2014	Burladés	3–0	Chantrea	Ripagaina, Burlada
20:00	Aldave 11'; Tito 27'; Iñigo Marco 44'

12 August 2014	Chantrea	2–0	Iruña	Chantrea, Pamplona
20:00

19 August 2014	Iruña	0–0	Burladés	Anexo 4 Tajonar, Pamplona
19:30

==== Semifinals ====
Team 1	Score	Team 2
Itaroa Huarte	2–1	Mutilvera
Osasuna B	2–0	Burladés

9 September 2014	Itaroa Huarte	2–1	Mutilvera	Areta, Huarte
20:30	Niko; Alberto Mendioroz		Aitor Zabalegui

10 September 2014	Osasuna B	2–0	Burladés	Tajonar, Pamplona
20:00	Iker Berruezo; Álex Satrústegui

==== Final ====
Team 1	Score	Team 2
Osasuna B	2–2 (p)	Itaroa Huarte

24 September 2014	Osasuna B	2–2 (a.e.t.) (3–0 p)	Itaroa Huarte	Tajonar, Pamplona
20:00	Pablo Ruiz 70'; Borja Aizpun 104'	Report	Mendióroz 76'; Oloriz 120'

=== Valencian Community tournament ===
==== First round ====
Team 1	Agg.	Team 2	1st leg	2nd leg
Torre Levante	1–4	Castellón	0–2	1–2
Novelda	9–1	Cullera	7–0	2–1

Elche Ilicitano and Ontinyent received a bye.

10 September 2014	Torre Levante	0–2	Castellón	Municipal Orriols, Valencia
18:30			Víctor Pino 11'; Yagüe 35'	Referee: Lagardera Ventura

10 September 2014	Novelda	7–0	Cullera	La Magdalena, Novelda, Alicante
20:30	Carlos López 15' 30'; Luis Carlos 27'; Javi Sánchez 47'; Ibra 52' 66'; Puerto 75'

17 September 2014	Castellón	2–1	Torre Levante	Nou Castalia, Castellón
21:00	Gabi 17'; Carrillo 28'		Juan Carlos 73'	Attendance: 600; Referee: García Gallegos

17 September 2014	Cullera	1–2	Novelda	Aeria, Cullera, Valencia
20:00	Ernest 34'		Edu Serrano 33'; Manu 36'	Referee: Garcelán Docio

==== Semifinals ====
Team 1	Agg.	Team 2	1st leg	2nd leg
Ontinyent	3–4	Elche Ilicitano	2–3	1–1
Novelda	2–3	Castellón	2–0	0–3

25 September 2014	Ontinyent	2–3	Elche Ilicitano	El Clariano, Ontinyent, Valencia
20:00	Serra 4'; Moiña 27'	Report	Pepe Romero 25'; Fran 41'; Iván Agudo 64'	Referee: Jorge Andújar

24 September 2014	Novelda	2–0	Castellón	La Magdalena, Novelda, Alicante
20:15	Edu Serrano 42'; Ibra 90+1'	Report

1 October 2014	Elche Ilicitano	1–1	Ontinyent	Ciudad Deportiva Díaz Iborra, Elche, Alicante
17:00	Iván Agudo 15' (pen.)		Marcos Campos 84'

1 October 2014	Castellón	3–0	Novelda	Nou Castalia, Castellón
21:00	Iker Zárate 44'; Charly Meseguer 72'; Gaby 75'	Report

==== Final ====
Team 1	Agg.	Team 2	1st leg	2nd leg
Castellón	5–5 (a)	Elche Ilicitano	3–1	2–4

8 October 2014	Castellón	3–1	Elche Ilicitano	Nou Castalia, Castellón
21:00	Adrià Gallego 85'; Borja García 88'; Rubén Suárez 90+1' (pen.)	Report	Patxi Dávila 75'	Attendance: 1,000; Referee: Mena Gimeno

15 October 2014	Elche Ilicitano	4–2	Castellón	Ciudad Deportiva Díaz Iborra, Elche, Alicante
17:00	Iván Agudo 15'; Joaquín 23'; Mario Arqués 51' (pen.); Pepe Romero 75'	Report	Ximo Ballesteros 11'; Borja Gracia 61'

== National phase ==
National phase will begin in November 2014. CD Ourense will not defend the title after being dissolved in July 2014.

Qualified teams

Teams losing Copa del Rey first round

- (Cantabria) Gimnástica
- (Asturias) Marino
- (Basque Country (autonomous community)) Sestao (Renounces to play)
- (Basque Country (autonomous community)) Amorebieta
- (La Rioja) Varea
- (Castile and León) At. Astorga
- (Community of Madrid) Trival Valderas
- (Castilla–La Mancha) Puertollano
- (Castilla–La Mancha) Toledo
- (Balearic Islands) At. Baleares
- (Balearic Islands) Peña Deportiva (Renounces to play)
- (Valencian Community) Hércules (Renounces to play)
- (Region of Murcia) FC Cartagena (Renounces to play)
- (Region of Murcia) La Hoya Lorca (Renounces to play)
- (Andalusia) San Roque de Lepe
- (Andalusia) Marbella
- (Andalusia) R. Jaén (Renounces to play)
- (Canary Islands) At. Granadilla

Winners of Autonomous Communities tournaments

- (La Rioja) Haro
- (Cantabria) Tropezón
- (Aragon) Almudévar
- (Navarre) Osasuna B
- (Community of Madrid) Móstoles
- (Castilla–La Mancha) Conquense
- (Balearic Islands) Mercadal
- (Extremadura) Arroyo
- (Valencian Community) Castellón
- (Castile and León) Arandina
- (Andalusia) Linares
- (Andalusia) Gerena
- (Asturias) Sporting B
- (Canary Islands) Unión Viera
- (Catalonia) Prat
- (Galicia (Spain)) Boiro
- (Region of Murcia) Cartagena FC
- (Basque Country (autonomous community)) R. Unión

=== Round of 32 ===
The draw for the first round was held on November 3. Round of 32 was played between 27 November and 18 December 2014.

Team 1	Agg.	Team 2	1st leg	2nd leg
Sporting B (3) (Asturias)	1–3	(Castile and León) At. Astorga (3)	0–1	1–2
Marino (3) (Asturias)	4–4 (a)	(Galicia (Spain)) Boiro (4)	4–2	0–2
R. Unión (3) (Basque Country (autonomous community))	3–1	(Basque Country (autonomous community)) Amorebieta (3)	0–0	3–1
Tropezón (3) (Cantabria)	3–1	(Cantabria) Gimnástica (4)	1–0	2–1
Osasuna B (4) (Navarre)	8–0	(La Rioja) Haro (4)	1–0	7–0
Varea (4) (La Rioja)	1–3	(Castile and León) Arandina (4)	1–0	0–3
Prat (4) (Catalonia)	1–3	(Aragon) Almudévar (4)	0–2	1–1
Mercadal (4) (Balearic Islands)	3–7	(Balearic Islands) At. Baleares (3)	2–1	1–6
Puertollano (4) (Castilla–La Mancha)	1–2	(Valencian Community) Castellón (4)	1–0	0–2
Conquense (3) (Castilla–La Mancha)	5–0	(Region of Murcia) Cartagena FC (4)	4–0	1–0
Arroyo (3) (Extremadura)	1–3 (a.e.t.)	(Andalusia) Linares (4)	1–0	0–3
Marbella (3) (Andalusia)	3–2	(Andalusia) San Roque de Lepe (3)	2–0	1–2
Móstoles (4) (Community of Madrid)	5–3	(Community of Madrid) Trival Valderas (3)	3–3	2–0
At. Granadilla (4) (Canary Islands)	w.o.	(Castilla–La Mancha) Toledo (3)	–	–

(Andalusia) Gerena (4) and (Canary Islands) Unión Viera (4) received a bye.

==== First leg ====
3 December 2014
15:45

Sporting B	0–1	At. Astorga
	Report	Borjas 43'

Mareo, Gijón, Asturias
Attendance: 300
3 December 2014
19:30

Marino	4–2	Boiro
Torres 15' 42'; Pandiani 68'; Merino 78'	Report	Rubén Márquez 56'; Manuel 82'

Balbín, Luanco, Asturias
Attendance: 168
2 December 2014
20:00

R. Unión	0–0	Amorebieta
	Report

Gal, Irún, Gipuzkoa
Attendance: 150
3 December 2014
20:00

Tropezón	1–0	Gimnástica
Álex 54'

Santa Ana, Tanos, Torrelavega, Cantabria
3 December 2014
19:00

Osasuna B	1–0	Haro
Álex Satrústegui 46'	Report

Tajonar, Pamplona, Navarre
3 December 2014
16:15

Varea	1–0	Arandina
Borja 64'

Municipal, Varea, La Rioja
4 December 2014
19:45

Prat	0–2	Almudévar
	Report	Fernando Arnedillo 10'; Marcos Martín 48'

Sagnier, El Prat, Barcelona
3 December 2014
17:30

Mercadal	2–1	At. Baleares
Xiscu 77'; Lacueva 87'	Report	Miquel Ripoll 16'

Sant Martí, Es Mercadal, Menorca, Balearic Islands
3 December 2014
20:00

Puertollano	1–0	Castellón
Rubén Gómez 55' (pen.)	Report

Ciudad de Puertollano, Puertollano, Ciudad Real
Attendance: 400
3 December 2014
15:30

Conquense	4–0	Cartagena FC
Picón 18'; Nacho Quirino 40'; Pablo 50'; Abraham (o.g.) 78'	Report

Nueva Fuensanta, Cuenca
Attendance: 250
3 December 2014
20:30

Arroyo	1–0	Linares
Coco 76'	Report

Municipal, Arroyo de la Luz, Cáceres
Attendance: 250
3 December 2014
20:00

Marbella	2–0	San Roque de Lepe
Casi 50'; Añón 72'	Report

Estadio Municipal, Marbella, Málaga
27 November 2014
20:30

Móstoles	3–3	Trival Valderas
Pedro Aldea 30'; Aguilar 48' 58'	Report	Manclares 52' (pen.); Óscar 72' (pen.); Mínguez 79'

El Soto, Móstoles, Madrid

==== Second leg ====
17 December 2014
20:00

At. Astorga	2–1	Sporting B
Borjas 18' 38'	Report	Álvaro 42'

La Eragudina, Astorga, León

At. Astorga won 3–1 on aggregate

17 December 2014
19:30

Boiro	2–0	Marino
Rubén Márquez 44' 78' (pen.)	Report

Vista Alegre, Boiro, A Coruña

Boiro won 4–4 on away goals rule

17 December 2014
20:00

Amorebieta	1–3	R. Unión
Muniozguren 49'		Urbieta 31'; Jorge Galán 42'; Eneko Romo 72'

Urritxe, Amorebieta, Biscay

R. Unión won 3–1 on aggregate

16 December 2014
20:30

Gimnástica	1–2	Tropezón
Ramón Portilla 53'	Report	Cote 59'; Perujo 68'

El Malecón, Torrelavega, Cantabria
Attendance: 300

Tropezón won 3–1 on aggregate

17 December 2014
20:00

Haro	0–7	Osasuna B
		Pablo Ruiz 20'; Álex Satrústegui 29' 48'; Imanol 66'; Isaac Manjón 75' 78'; Kike Barja 89'

El Mazo, Haro, La Rioja

Osasuna B won 8–0 on aggregate

17 December 2014
20:30

Arandina	3–0	Varea
Ruba 6'; David Terleira 41' 51'	Report

El Montecillo, Aranda de Duero, Burgos
Attendance: 400

Arandina won 3–1 on aggregate

17 December 2014
19:30

Almudévar	1–1	Prat
Eric Ruiz (o.g.) 52'	Report	Oriol Molins 76'

La Corona, Almudévar, Huesca
Attendance: 300

Almudévar won 3–1 on aggregate

17 December 2014
17:00

At. Baleares	6–1	Mercadal
Nando 21' 62'; Ripoll 47'; Nacho 52'; Carlos Rodríguez 68'; Dalamedo 90'	Report	Mas 42'

Son Malferit, Palma, Majorca, Balearic Islands
Attendance: 500

At. Baleares won 7–3 on aggregate

17 December 2014
20:30

Castellón	2–0	Puertollano
Carrillo 20'; Adrià Gallego 23'	Report

Nou Castalia, Castellón
Attendance: 600

Castellón won 2–1 on aggregate

17 December 2014
19:00

Cartagena FC	0–1	Conquense
	Report	Nacho Quirino 48'

Cartagonova, Cartagena

Conquense won 5–0 on aggregate

17 December 2014
20:45

Linares	3–0 (a.e.t.)	Arroyo
Ángel Gómez 78' 117'; Juanma (o.g.) 99'	Report

Linarejos, Linares, Jaén

Linares won 3–1 on aggregate after extra time

17 December 2014
20:30

San Roque de Lepe	2–1	Marbella
Juan Gómez 4'; Manu Fidalgo 74' (pen.)	Report	Carlos Portero 66'

Ciudad de Lepe, Lepe, Huelva

Marbella won 3–2 on aggregate

18 December 2014
20:30

Trival Valderas	0–2	Móstoles
	Report	Cristian 78'; Corrales 81'

La Canaleja, Alcorcón, Madrid

Móstoles won 5–3 on aggregate

=== Round of 16 ===
The draw for the round of 16 was held on December 19. Round of 16 was played between 7 and 22 January 2015.

Team 1	Agg.	Team 2	1st leg	2nd leg
At. Astorga (3) (Castile and León)	3–4	(Cantabria) Tropezón (3)	1–2	2–2
Arandina (4) (Castile and León)	2–2 (a)	(Galicia (Spain)) Boiro (4)	0–1	2–1
Castellón (4) (Valencian Community)	3–1	(Navarre) Osasuna B (4)	3–0	0–1
Almudévar (4) (Aragon)	1–6	(Basque Country (autonomous community)) R. Unión (3)	0–2	1–4
Gerena (4) (Andalusia)	1–1 (5–4 p)	(Andalusia) Marbella (3)	1–0	0–1
Linares (4) (Andalusia)	6–2	(Canary Islands) Unión Viera (4)	5–0	1–2
Conquense (3) (Castilla–La Mancha)	3–2	(Community of Madrid) Móstoles (4)	1–0	2–2
At. Baleares (3) (Balearic Islands)	2–2 (a)	(Castilla–La Mancha) Toledo (3)	0–1	2–1

==== First leg ====
8 January 2015
20:00

At. Astorga	1–2	Tropezón
Bandera (penalty missed); Adri Rojo 64'	Report	Vitaliy 63'; Iñaki 88'

La Eragudina, Astorga, León
Attendance: 300
8 January 2015
20:00

Arandina	0–1	Boiro
	Report	Añón 68'

El Montecillo, Aranda de Duero, Burgos
Attendance: 300
7 January 2015
20:30

Castellón	3–0	Osasuna B
Omar 57'; Rubén Suárez 59'; Víctor Pino 88'	Report

Nou Castalia, Castellón
Attendance: 500
8 January 2015
19:30

Almudévar	0–2	R. Unión
	Report	Eneko Romo 28' (pen.); Urbieta 70'

La Corona, Almudévar, Huesca
14 January 2015
19:30

Gerena	1–0	Marbella
Francis 8'	Report

Municipal José Juan Romero Gil, Gerena, Seville
Attendance: 300
7 January 2015
20:00

Linares	5–0	Unión Viera
Garrido 5'; Manu Castillo 25' 78'; Rubio 26'; Ángel 67'	Report

Linarejos, Linares, Jaén
8 January 2015
15:30

Conquense	1–0	Móstoles
Dani Fernández 40'	Report

Nueva Fuensanta, Cuenca
Attendance: 200
8 January 2015
19:00

At. Baleares	0–1	Toledo
	Report	Iván Mateo 87'

Son Malferit, Palma, Majorca, Balearic Islands
Attendance: 500

==== Second leg ====
21 January 2015
20:00

Tropezón	2–2	At. Astorga
Perujo 7'; Vitaly 13'	Report	Borja 47'; Asier 81'

Santa Ana, Tanos, Torrelavega, Cantabria
22 January 2015
20:00

Boiro	1–2	Arandina
Rubén 85'	Report	Toni Seoane 21'; David Álvarez 23'

Vista Alegre, Boiro, A Coruña
Attendance: 400

Arandina won 2–2 on away goals rule

21 January 2015
19:00

Osasuna B	1–0	Castellón
Achi 44'	Report

Tajonar, Pamplona, Navarre
Attendance: 150

Castellón won 3–1 on aggregate

22 January 2015
19:30

R. Unión	4–1	Almudévar
Tenreiro 31'; Saizar 81' 90+1'; Patxi Martínez 90+3'	Report	Agus Alonso 50'

Gal, Irún, Gipuzkoa

R. Unión won 6–1 on aggregate

21 January 2015
19:30

Marbella	1–0 (a.e.t.) (pen. 4–5)	Gerena
Verdú 90+3'	Report

Estadio Municipal, Marbella, Málaga
Attendance: 500

Gerena won 1–1 on aggregate after extra time and penalty kicks

21 January 2015
20:00

Unión Viera	2–1	Linares
Juanyi 45+1'; Sandro 85'	Report	Ángel 65'

Alfonso Silva, Las Palmas, Gran Canaria

Linares won 6–2 on aggregate

22 January 2015
20:30

Móstoles	2–2	Conquense
Pedro Aldea 38'; Mora 63'	Report	Dani 40'; Adrián 79'

El Soto, Móstoles, Madrid

Conquense won 3–2 on aggregate

21 January 2015
20:00

Toledo	1–2	At. Baleares
Iván Mateo (penalty missed); Aarón Bueno 89' (pen.)	Report	Nando Ramón 86' (pen.); Bernat Alomar 88'

Salto del Caballo, Toledo

At. Baleares won 2–2 on aggregate on away goals rule

=== Quarter-finals ===
The draw for the quarter-finals was held 23 January 2015. Quarter-finals were played between 4 and 19 February 2015.

Team 1	Agg.	Team 2	1st leg	2nd leg
Castellón (4) (Valencian Community)	4–3	(Andalusia) Gerena (4)	3–1	1–2
Conquense (3) (Castilla–La Mancha)	0–3	(Andalusia) Linares (4)	0–0	0–3
At. Baleares (3) (Balearic Islands)	4–5 (a.e.t.)	(Basque Country (autonomous community)) R. Unión (3)	2–1	2–4
Arandina (4) (Castile and León)	3–5	(Cantabria) Tropezón (3)	2–2	1–3

==== First leg ====
5 February 2015
20:00

Castellón	3–1	Gerena
Yagüe 20'; Pruden 24' 40'	Report	Tedi 70'

Nou Castalia, Castellón
Attendance: 1.200
12 February 2015
16:00

Conquense	0–0	Linares
	Report

Nueva Fuensanta, Cuenca
Attendance: 100

Postponed 4 February by snow.

4 February 2015
18:30

At. Baleares	2–1	R. Unión
Tedi 20'; Juárez 90+1'	Report	Robellar 61'

Son Malferit, Palma, Majorca, Balearic Islands
Attendance: 300
11 February 2015
20:15

Arandina	2–2	Tropezón
Gustavo 50'; David Álvarez 86'	Report	Cote 3'; Albert (o.g.) 69'

El Montecillo, Aranda de Duero, Burgos
Attendance: 200

Postponed 5 February by bad pitch conditions.

==== Second leg ====
11 February 2015
20:00

Gerena	2–1	Castellón
Iván 76' 90+4'	Report	Negredo 49' (pen.)

Municipal José Juan Romero Gil, Gerena, Seville
Attendance: 1.400

Castellón won 4–3 on aggregate

19 February 2015
20:45

Linares	3–0	Conquense
Manu Castillo 40'; Fran Carles 49' (pen.); Jorge Sanabria 62'	Report

Linarejos, Linares, Jaén
Attendance: 1.200

Linares won 3–0 on aggregate

11 February 2015
19:30

R. Unión	4–2 (a.e.t.)	At. Baleares
Iosu Esnaola 61'; Goiko 80' (pen.) 93'; Juan Domínguez 118'	Report	Tim Vincken 53'; Chando 113'

Gal, Irún, Gipuzkoa

R. Unión won 5–4 on aggregate after extra time

18 February 2015
20:00

Tropezón	3–1	Arandina
Álex 8'; Fresno 68'; Primo 85'	Report	Gustavo 78'

Santa Ana, Tanos, Torrelavega, Cantabria

Tropezón won 5–3 on aggregate

=== Semi-finals ===
The draw for the semi-finals was held 13 February 2015. Semi-finals were played between 4 and 18 March 2015.

Team 1	Agg.	Team 2	1st leg	2nd leg
Castellón (4) (Valencian Community)	2–1	(Cantabria) Tropezón (3)	2–0	0–1
Linares (4) (Andalusia)	0–2	(Basque Country (autonomous community)) R. Unión (3)	0–0	0–2

==== First leg ====
5 March 2015
20:00

Castellón	2–0	Tropezón
Gallego 45'; Yagüe 64'	Report

Nou Castalia, Castellón
4 March 2015
20:45

Linares	0–0	R. Unión
	Report

Linarejos, Linares, Jaén
Attendance: 1.500

==== Second leg ====
18 March 2015
20:00

Tropezón	1–0	Castellón
Juan Fresno 16' (pen.)	Report

Santa Ana, Tanos, Torrelavega, Cantabria
Attendance: 400

Castellón won 2–1 on aggregate

18 March 2015
19:30

R. Unión	2–0	Linares
Ozkoidi 2'; Goikoetxea 7'	Report

Gal, Irún, Gipuzkoa

Real Unión won 2–0 on aggregate

=== Final ===
Final was played between 9 and 16 April 2015.

Team 1	Agg.	Team 2	1st leg	2nd leg
Castellón (4) (Valencian Community)	0–4	(Basque Country (autonomous community)) R. Unión (3)	0–1	0–3

==== First leg ====
9 April 2015
20:30

Castellón	0–1	R. Unión
	Report	Jorge Galán 89'

Nou Castalia, Castellón
Attendance: 8,000

==== Second leg ====
16 April 2015
20:30

R. Unión	3–0	Castellón
Mújika 3'; Mikel Alonso 72'; Goikoetxea 90+2'	Report

Gal, Irún, Gipuzkoa
Attendance: 3,000

R. Unión won 4–0 on aggregate.
