= 2004 Copa del Rey Juvenil =

54th staging of the youth football tournament

Tournament details
- Country: Spain
- Teams: 16

Final positions
- Champions: Espanyol
- Runners-up: Osasuna

Tournament statistics
- Matches played: 29
- Goals scored: 111 (3.83 per match)

The 2004 Copa del Rey Juvenil was the 54th staging of the Copa del Rey Juvenil tournament. The competition began on May 16, 2004 and ended on June 26, 2004 with the final.

== First round ==
Team 1	Agg.	Team 2	1st leg	2nd leg
Sporting de Gijón	2–3	Osasuna	1–1	1–2
Real Sociedad	6–4	Racing de Santander	2–2	4–2
Rayo Vallecano	2–5	Vecindario	1–3	1–2
Betis	2–5	Real Madrid	2–2	0–3
FC Barcelona	8–0	Sevilla	3–0	5–0
Mallorca	2–4	Espanyol	2–1	0–3
Valencia	2–3	Málaga	2–2	0–1
Celta de Vigo	5–6	Athletic Bilbao	3–3	2–3

== Quarterfinals ==
Team 1	Agg.	Team 2	1st leg	2nd leg
Espanyol	6–4	Athletic Bilbao	6–0	0–4
Real Sociedad	1–4	FC Barcelona	1–0	0–4
Vecindario	3–6	Osasuna	2–2	1–4
Real Madrid	6–2	Málaga	1–1	5–1

== Semifinals ==
Team 1	Agg.	Team 2	1st leg	2nd leg
Real Madrid	3–4	Espanyol	2–1	1–3
FC Barcelona	4–4 (a)	Osasuna	3–3	1–1

== Final ==
26 June 2004
18:30

Espanyol	3–2	Osasuna
Yagüe 39'; Barreto 67'; Tomàs 88'	Report	Chica 47' (o.g.); Pablo Erice 54' (pen.)

Constantino Navarro, Baza
Referee: Castillo Estévez

Espanyol:
GK	(Spain) Biel Ribas
DF	(Spain) Marc Torrejón (yellow card) (substituted off) 59'
DF	(Spain) Sergio Sánchez (yellow card)
DF	(Spain) Miquel Robusté
DF	(Spain) Javi Chica
MF	(Spain) Enric Maureta
MF	(Spain) Ángel Martínez
MF	(Spain) Javi Márquez (substituted off) 46'
FW	(Spain) Albert Yagüe
MF	(Spain) Marc Pedraza (substituted off) 74'
FW	(Spain) Joan Tomàs
Substitutes:
MF	(Spain) Iray Barreto (substituted on) 46'
MF	(Spain) Luis Valladar (substituted on) 59'
MF	(Spain) Marc Arias (substituted on) 74'
Manager:
(Spain) Ángel Pedraza

Osasuna:
GK	(Spain) Roberto Santamaría
DF	(Spain) Fernando Delgado (yellow card)
DF	(Spain) Nacho Monreal
DF	(Spain) Iñaki (yellow card)
DF	(Spain) Miguel Ainzua (substituted off) 89'
MF	(Spain) Ion Erice (yellow card)
MF	(Spain) Oier Sanjurjo
MF	(Spain) Pablo Erice (substituted off) 73'
FW	(Spain) Óscar Alonso
MF	(Spain) Raúl García
MF	(Spain) Iñigo López (substituted off) 65'
Substitutes:
MF	(Spain) David Lázaro (yellow card) (substituted on) 65'
MF	(Spain) Carlos Jiménez (substituted on) 73'
FW	(Spain) Óscar Vega (substituted on) 89'
Manager:
(Spain) Cuco Ziganda

Copa del Generalísimo
Winners
Espanyol
