= Xiker =

Spanish footballer

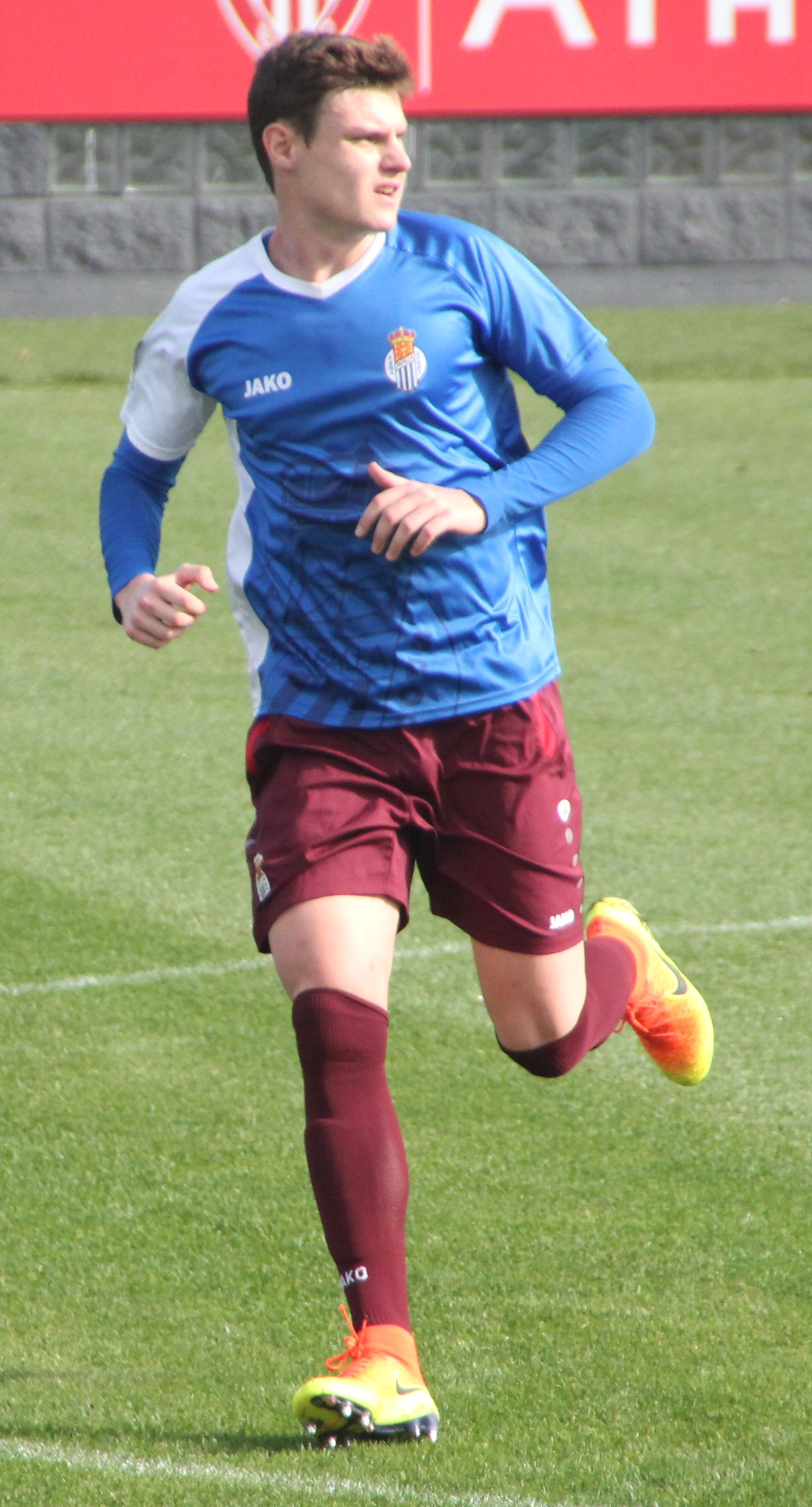

Personal information
- Full name: Xiker Ozerinjauregi Mendikoetxea
- Date of birth: 30 January 1997 (age 29)
- Place of birth: Zalla, Spain
- Height: 1.87 m (6 ft 2 in)
- Position: Centre back

Team information
- Current team: Estepona
- Number: 5

Youth career
- 2007–2014: Athletic Bilbao

Senior career*
Years	Team	Apps	(Gls)
2014–2016	Basconia	42	(0)
2016–2017	Toledo	7	(0)
2017–2018	Peña Sport	37	(2)
2018–2019	Real Sociedad B	3	(0)
2019	Cornellà	9	(0)
2019–2020	Betis B	10	(0)
2020	Sabadell	4	(0)
2020–2021	Ebro	17	(1)
2021–2022	Logroñés	20	(0)
2022–2023	Amorebieta	6	(0)
2023–2024	Badalona Futur	35	(1)
2025	Malappuram		
2026–	Estepona	3	(0)

International career
2013	Spain U16	3	(0)
2015	Spain U18	3	(0)
2014	Spain U19	4	(0)
- * Club domestic league appearances and goals as of 7 May 2026

Xiker Ozerinjauregi Mendikoetxea (born 30 January 1997), known as Xiker, is a Spanish professional footballer who plays as a central defender for the Estepona.

Xiker began his footballing career in 2007 when he joined the academy of Athletic Bilbao. He progressed through the club's youth and reserve sides over the course of the next nine years before going on to spend a season at each of Segunda División B clubs Toledo and Peña Sport, after which he joined Real Sociedad B in 2018. He then enjoyed brief spells with Cornellà, Real Betis B, Sabadell, Ebro and Logroñés, before signing for Amorebieta in 2022.

Xiker is also a former Spanish youth international and represented Spain at various youth levels between 2013 and 2015.

== Club career ==
=== Early career ===
A product of Athletic Bilbao's famed academy, Xiker joined the club at the age of ten and spent nine seasons developing his game at the Lezama training ground. During his time with Athletic, he represented the club at the UEFA Youth League and was considered to be one of Spain's brightest defensive prospects. His progression through the ranks was interrupted, however, when he suffered a serious injury while on international duty with the Spanish youth team.

=== Toledo ===
Following his injury, Xiker saw his game time with Athletic feeder-club CD Basconia reduced, and on 5 August 2016 Segunda División B side Toledo announced that the club had signed him on a two-year deal after Athletic agreed to the termination of his contract. Part of the agreement was that Athletic retained the option of re-purchase on Xiker at the end of each season. He made his debut for the club on 3 September, starting in a 2–0 loss to Arenas Club. On 23 October, Xiker suffered a muscular injury in Toledo's 1–0 win over Real Unión and was ruled out for the remainder of the year, with doctors only giving him the clear to return to training on 3 January 2017. He made his long-awaited return to the first team on the final day of the regular season on 14 May, starting in a 3–0 loss to Bilbao Athletic. The result saw Toledo end the campaign in second position, four points behind champions Albacete, and thereby qualified for the play-offs to the Segunda División. The club were ultimately unsuccessful in their bid for promotion, however, as they were knocked out by Atlético Baleares after a 3–1 aggregate defeat.

=== Peña Sport ===
Having been restricted to just seven appearances as a result of his injury, Xiker rescinded his contract with Toledo and signed for newly-promoted Segunda División B side Peña Sport on 16 July 2017. He made his debut for the club on 20 August, starting in a 1–0 defeat to Real Unión. Ten days later, he featured in the Copa del Rey for the first time, though Peña were unable to hold onto the lead in a 2–1 defeat to Mirandés. He scored his first senior goal on 14 January 2018, netting Peña's third in a 3–3 draw with Arenas Club. In doing so, he helped the club to their eighth consecutive match without defeat, having previously not won in their first 13. The club's resurgence ultimately came too late, though, and they suffered relegation in the penultimate match of the season following a 3–0 defeat to UD Logroñés. He ended the campaign having scored twice in 37 league appearances.

=== Real Sociedad / Cornellà ===
In June 2018, following a collaborative agreement between Peña Sport and Real Sociedad, Xiker joined the latter on a two-year deal where he linked up with the Real Sociedad B side. He made his debut on 9 September, starting in a 2–0 defeat to Barakaldo. He struggled for game time thereafter, however, and made just three appearances before leaving the club in January in seek of first-team opportunities. On 28 January 2019, Xiker signed for Cornellà after his contract with Real Sociedad was terminated by agreement. He made his debut for the club on 2 February in a 1–0 loss to Badalona. In his debut season, he made 14 appearances as Cornellà reached the final of the Copa Federación, where they were defeated 5–2 on aggregate by Mirandés, and the promotion playoffs.

=== Betis / Sabadell ===
On 19 July, Xiker was on the move again when he signed with Real Betis, joining up with the club's reserve side. He ultimately made 10 appearances for the club before leaving midway through the season. On 31 January 2020, Xiker rescinded his contract with Betis in order to sign a new deal with Sabadell. There, he made four appearances for the remainder of the campaign, which was largely interrupted by the outbreak of the COVID-19 pandemic, including one in the play-off final victory over Barcelona B which secured the club's promotion to the Segunda División. However, his contract with Sabadell was not renewed following the conclusion of the campaign and he was one of eight players released by the club ahead of the new season.

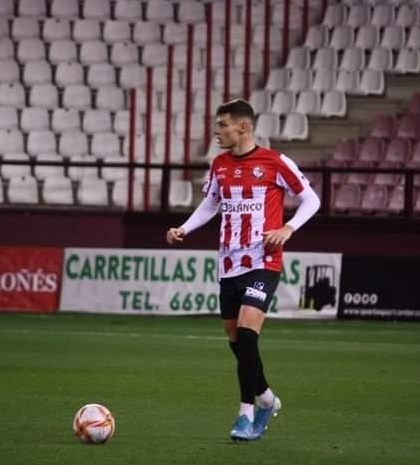
Xiker playing for Logroñés in 2021

=== Ebro ===
Following the expiration of his deal with Sabadell, Xiker signed a season-long contract with Ebro and made 18 appearances across all competitions for the campaign, before departing to join SD Logroñés in the newly-branded Primera División RFEF.

=== Logroñés / Amorebieta ===
On 18 June 2021, Xiker was officially unveiled as a new signing by Logroñés, who had narrowly missed out on achieving back-to-back promotions to the Segunda División the season before. He quickly established himself as a regular in the starting XI, which included an appearance against Bilbao Athletic in October, and helped the club end the calendar year as the "best year in the club's history." He made 20 league appearances in total for the season, before joining Amorebieta on a free transfer the in July the following year.

== International career ==
=== Spain national youth teams ===
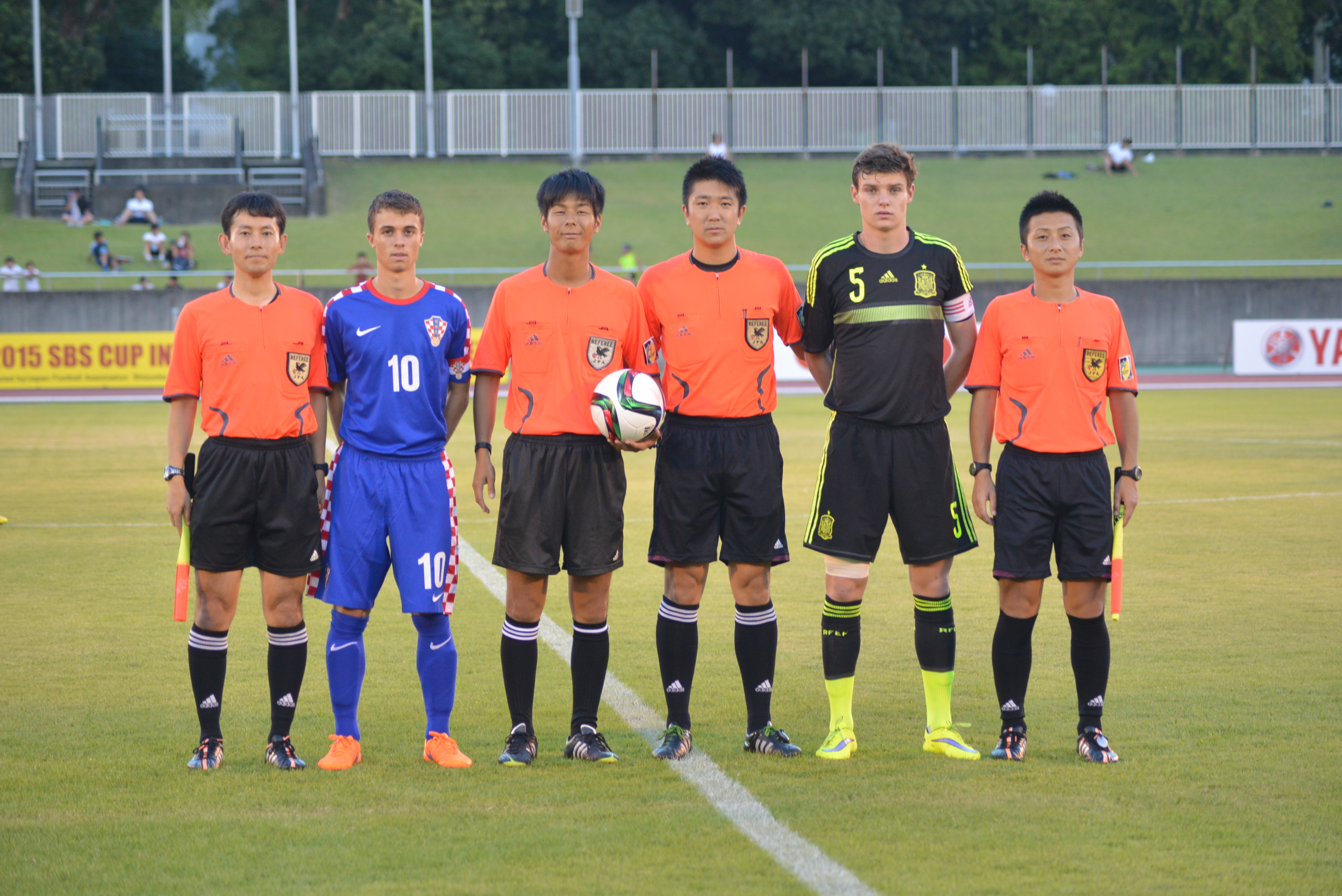
Xiker (right) captained the Spain U18 side at the SBS Cup in Japan in 2015.

Xiker is a former Spanish youth international and represented the nation at all levels from the U16s to the U19s between 2013 and 2015. In 2015, he was part of the Spain U18 squad which won the Atlantic Cup after beating Portugal, Costa Rica and the Canary Islands. Later that year, he was included in Spain's preliminary squad for the UEFA European Under-19 Championship in Greece. He was one of six players cut from the final squad, however, as Spain went on to claim their seventh title in the competition.

== Career statistics ==
As of match played 28 April 2024

Appearances and goals by club, season and competition
Club	Season	League			Cup^{1}		Other^{2}		Total	
Club	Season	League	Apps	Goals	Apps	Goals	Apps	Goals	Apps	Goals
Basconia	2014–15	Tercera División	25	0	–		–		25	0
Basconia	2015–16	Tercera División	17	0	–		–		17	0
Basconia	Total		42	0	0	0	0	0	42	0
Toledo	2016–17	Segunda División B	7	0	0	0	–		7	0
Peña Sport	2017–18	Segunda División B	37	2	1	0	3	0	41	2
Real Sociedad B	2018–19	Segunda División B	3	0	–		0	0	3	0
Cornellà	2018–19	Segunda División B	9	0	–		5	0	14	0
Real Betis B	2019–20	Tercera División	10	0	–		0	0	10	0
Sabadell	2019–20	Segunda División B	4	0	–		–		4	0
Ebro	2020–21	Segunda División B	17	1	–		1	0	18	1
Logroñés	2021–22	Primera División RFEF	20	1	1	0	–		21	0
Amorebieta	2022–23	Primera División RFEF	5	0	0	0	–		5	0
Badalona Futur	2022–23	Segunda Federación	15	1	0	0	1	0	16	1
Badalona Futur	2023–24	Segunda Federación	20	0	1	0	1	0	22	0
Badalona Futur	Total		35	1	1	0	2	0	38	1
Career total			190	4	3	0	11	0	203	4

^{1} Includes Copa del Rey matches.
^{2} Includes Copa Federación and Copa Catalunya matches.
