= 2015 Tercera División play-offs =

Spanish football league play-offs

The 2015 Tercera División play-offs to Segunda División B from Tercera División (Promotion play-offs) were the final playoffs for the promotion from 2014–15 Tercera División to 2015–16 Segunda División B. The first four teams in each group took part in the play-off.

== Format ==
The eighteen group winners have the opportunity to be promoted directly to Segunda División B. The eighteen group winners were drawn into a two-legged series where the nine winners will promote to Segunda División B. The nine losing clubs will enter the play-off round for the last nine promotion spots.

The eighteen runners-up were drawn against one of the eighteen fourth-placed clubs outside their group and the eighteen third-placed clubs were drawn against one another in a two-legged series. The twenty-seven winners will advance with the nine losing clubs from the champions' series to determine the eighteen teams that will enter the last two-legged series for the last nine promotion spots. In all the playoff series, the lower-ranked club play at home first. Whenever there is a tie in position (e.g. like the group winners in the champions' series or the third-placed teams in the first round), a draw determines the club to play at home first.

== Group Winners promotion play-off ==
=== Qualified teams ===
The draw took place in the RFEF headquarters, in Las Rozas (Madrid), on 18 May 2015.

Group	Team
1	Pontevedra
2	Condal
3	Laredo
4	Portugalete
5	Ascó
6	Castellón
7	Rayo Majadahonda
8	Arandina
9	Linares

Group	Team
10	Algeciras
11	Formentera
12	Mensajero
13	Jumilla
14	Mérida
15	Peña Sport
16	Varea
17	Ebro
18	Talavera de la Reina

=== Matches ===
Team 1	Agg.	Team 2	1st leg	2nd leg
Portugalete	0–2	Talavera de la Reina	0–0	0–2
Ebro	3–2	Varea	1–0	2–2
Peña Sport	2–1	Formentera	0–0	2–1
Mérida	2–1	Laredo	0–0	2–1
Mensajero	1–1 (4–3 p)	Pontevedra	1–0	0–1
Linares	3–0	Castellón	1–0	2–0
Condal	2–5	Rayo Majadahonda	2–2	0–3
Arandina	1–1 (a)	Algeciras	0–0	1–1
Ascó	4–5	Jumilla	2–2	2–3

Promoted to Segunda División B
Arandina (3 years later)	Ebro (First time ever)	Jumilla (First time ever)	Linares (First time ever)	Mensajero (14 years later)	Mérida (First time ever)	Peña Sport (One year later)	Rayo Majadahonda (11 years later)	Talavera de la Reina (First time ever)

== Non-champions promotion play-off ==
=== First round ===
==== Qualified teams ====
The draw took place in the RFEF headquarters, in Las Rozas (Madrid), on 18 May 2014.

Group	Position	Team
1	2nd	Deportivo La Coruña B
2	2nd	Caudal
3	2nd	Gimnástica Torrelavega
4	2nd	Gernika
5	2nd	Pobla de Mafumet
6	2nd	Atlético Levante
7	2nd	Navalcarnero
8	2nd	Numancia B
9	2nd	Atlético Malagueño
10	2nd	San Fernando
11	2nd	Llosetense
12	2nd	Lanzarote
13	2nd	Murcia Imperial
14	2nd	Extremadura
15	2nd	San Juan
16	2nd	Calahorra
17	2nd	Teruel
18	2nd	Almansa

Group	Position	Team
1	3rd	Cerceda
2	3rd	Oviedo B
3	3rd	Racing de Santander B
4	3rd	Arenas
5	3rd	Europa
6	3rd	Novelda
7	3rd	Alcobendas Sport
8	3rd	Palencia
9	3rd	San Pedro
10	3rd	Gerena
11	3rd	Peña Deportiva
12	3rd	Marino
13	3rd	El Castillo
14	3rd	Jerez
15	3rd	Izarra
16	3rd	SD Logroñés
17	3rd	Sariñena
18	3rd	Quintanar del Rey

Group	Position	Team
1	4th	Choco
2	4th	Tuilla
3	4th	Cayón
4	4th	Durango
5	4th	Figueres
6	5th	Ontinyent
7	4th	Unión Adarve
8	4th	Gimnástica Segoviana
9	4th	Martos
10	4th	Atlético Sanluqueño
11	4th	Mercadal
12	4th	Sporting San José
13	4th	Águilas
14	4th	Badajoz
15	4th	Osasuna B
16	4th	Haro Deportivo
17	4th	Tarazona
18	4th	Manzanares

=== Matches ===
Team 1	Agg.	Team 2	1st leg	2nd leg
Osasuna B	2–2 (a)	Atlético Malagueño	0–0	2–2
Sporting San José	1–3	San Juan	1–1	0–2
Durango	2–3	Deportivo La Coruña B	2–1	0–2
Haro	0–0 (5–3 p)	Caudal	0–0	0–0
Gimnástica Segoviana	3–1	Calahorra	3–0	0–1
Martos	5–1	Almansa	3–0	2–1
Manzanares	0–0 (5–3 p)	Lanzarote	0–0	0–0
Badajoz	3–3 (a)	Murcia Imperial	1–3	2–0
Ontinyent	1–5	San Fernando	0–1	1–4
Tuilla	0–1	Pobla de Mafumet	0–0	0–1
Tarazona	1–4	Atlético Levante	0–2	1–2
Águilas	1–1 (3–4 p)	Gimnástica Torrelavega	1–0	0–1
Mercadal	2–3	Gernika	1–0	1–3
Figueres	2–2 (a)	Numancia B	2–1	0–1
Cayón	1–1 (a)	Navalcarnero	0–0	1–1
Unión Adarve	2–3	Llosetense	2–0	0–3
Choco	3–5	Extremadura	0–3	3–2
Atlético Sanluqueño	3–3 (6–5 p)	Teruel	1–2	2–1
Cerceda	1–7	SD Logroñés	1–4	0–3
Sariñena	4–3	Quintanar del Rey	1–1	3–2
Izarra	4–2	Novelda	3–2	1–0
Racing de Santander B	0–2	Peña Deportiva	0–1	0–1
Europa	1–2	Jerez	1–0	0–2
Oviedo B	1–2	Arenas	1–0	0–2 (aet)
El Castillo	2–4	Palencia	2–2	0–2
Marino	1–5	San Pedro	0–2	1–3
Alcobendas Sport	3–5	Gerena	1–0	2–5

=== Second round ===
==== Qualified teams ====
The draw was held in the RFEF headquarters, in Las Rozas (Madrid).

Group	Position	Team
1	1st	Pontevedra
2	1st	Condal
3	1st	Laredo
4	1st	Portugalete
5	1st	Ascó
6	1st	Castellón
10	1st	Algeciras
11	1st	Formentera
16	1st	Varea

Group	Position	Team
1	2nd	Deportivo La Coruña B
3	2nd	Gimnástica Torrelavega
4	2nd	Gernika
5	2nd	Pobla de Mafumet
6	2nd	Atlético Levante
8	2nd	Numancia B
10	2nd	San Fernando
11	2nd	Llosetense
13	2nd	Murcia Imperial
14	2nd	Extremadura
15	2nd	San Juan

Group	Position	Team
4	3rd	Arenas
8	3rd	Palencia
9	3rd	San Pedro
10	3rd	Gerena
11	3rd	Peña Deportiva
14	3rd	Jerez
15	3rd	Izarra
16	3rd	SD Logroñés
17	3rd	Sariñena

Group	Position	Team
3	4th	Cayón
8	4th	Gimnástica Segoviana
9	4th	Martos
10	4th	Atlético Sanluqueño
15	4th	Osasuna B
16	4th	Haro
18	4th	Manzanares

==== Matches ====
Team 1	Agg.	Team 2	1st leg	2nd leg
Gimnástica Segoviana	3–1	Laredo	1–0	2–1 (a.e.t.)
Atlético Sanluqueño	1–0	Formentera	1–0	0–0
Manzanares	1–2	Pontevedra	1–0	0–2 (a.e.t.)
Osasuna B	6–2	Varea	3–0	2–3
Haro	3–3 (3–0 p)	Castellón	2–1	1–2
Cayón	4–1	Condal	1–0	3–1
Martos	2-4	Portugalete	0–3	2-1
SD Logroñés	2–2 (5–4 p)	Ascó	1–1	1–1
Peña Deportiva	0–1	Algeciras	0–0	0–1
Sariñena	2–3	Numancia B	1–1	1–2
Izarra	2–2 (a)	Gimnástica Torrelavega	1–0	1–2
Arenas	4–1	Extremadura	0–0	4–1
Palencia	2–3	Atlético Levante	1–1	1–2
Gerena	3–0	San Juan	2–0	1–0
Jerez	2–3	Gernika	2–0	0–3 (a.e.t.)
San Pedro	1–0	Deportivo La Coruña B	1–0	0–0
Llosetense	2–1	Murcia Imperial	2–1	0–0
San Fernando	1–2	Pobla de Mafumet	1–0	0–2

=== Third round ===
==== Qualified teams ====
Group	Position	Team
1	1st	Pontevedra
4	1st	Portugalete
10	1st	Algeciras

Group	Position	Team
4	2nd	Gernika
5	2nd	Pobla de Mafumet
6	2nd	Atlético Levante
8	2nd	Numancia B
11	2nd	Llosetense

Group	Position	Team
4	3rd	Arenas
9	3rd	San Pedro
10	3rd	Gerena
15	3rd	Izarra
16	3rd	SD Logroñés

Group	Position	Team
3	4th	Cayón
8	4th	Gimnástica Segoviana
10	4th	Atlético Sanluqueño
15	4th	Osasuna B
16	4th	Haro

==== Matches ====
Team 1	Agg.	Team 2	1st leg	2nd leg
Gimnástica Segoviana	1–2	Algeciras	1–1	0–1
Haro	1–3	Pontevedra	1–0	0–3
Cayón	0–3	Portugalete	0–0	0–3
Osasuna B	1–2	Gernika	0–1	1–1
Atlético Sanluqueño	1–2	Atlético Levante	0–0	1–2
Izarra	4–0	Numancia B	1–0	3–0
Gerena	1–1 (4–5 p)	Pobla de Mafumet	1–0	0–1
San Pedro	1–4	Llosetense	0–1	1–3
SD Logroñés	2–5	Arenas	0–1	2–4

Promoted to Segunda División B
Algeciras (One year later)	Arenas (35 years later)	Atlético Levante (One year later)	Gernika (12 years later)	Izarra (2 years later)	Llosetense (First time ever)	Pobla de Mafumet (First time ever)	Pontevedra (4 years later)	Portugalete (9 years later)

== See also ==
- 2015 Segunda División play-offs
- 2015 Segunda División B play-offs
