= CD Palencia Balompié =

Spanish football team (2011–2019)

Palencia
- Full name: Club Deportivo Palencia Balompié
- Nickname: Dépor
- Founded: 2011
- Dissolved: 2019
- Ground: La Balastera, Palencia, Castile and León, Spain
- Capacity: 8,070
- Chairman: Javier Rodríguez
- Manager: Miguel Zurro
- 2018–19: Primera Regional – Group A, retired
Home colours

Club Deportivo Palencia Balompié was a Spanish football team based in Palencia, in the autonomous community of Castile and León. Founded in 2011, it was dissolved in 2019, holding home games at La Balastera, with a capacity of 8,070 seats.

== History ==
CD Palencia Balompié was founded in 2011 by a group of supporters who disagreed about the conversion of CF Palencia into a Sociedad Anónima Deportiva. It took the name of Club Deportivo Palencia from the first club of the city, which was founded in 1929.

On 21 June 2014, Palencia promoted to Tercera División thanks to the promotion of Atlético Astorga and Valladolid B to Segunda División B.

In its first season in Tercera División, Palencia finished in the third position, qualifying for the promotion play-offs to Segunda División B. Just in the next season, the club achieved the promotion to the third tier by beating Loja, SD Logroñés and Deportivo Aragón in the promotion play-offs.

The season in Segunda División B Group 1 was very controversial as the board of directors tried to transform the club into a Sociedad Anónima Deportiva, despite the opposition of the supporters of the club and despite being forbidden in the club's bylaws. However, a judicial statement stopped any try of conversion. The team also garnered some attention at the unveiling of their season kits, which had an unorthodox design displaying the human muscular system.

Finally, Palencia could not remain in Segunda División after finishing in the 18th position, and was demoted to Regional Aficionados due to unpaid debts to their players.

On 9 September 2017, the club did not play its first league game due to not having enough members in the team. After ending normally the season, Palencia would not register in any competition for the 2018–19 season.

== Season to season ==
Season	Tier	Division	Place	Copa del Rey
2011–12	6	1ª Prov.	2nd	
2012–13	5	1ª Reg.	7th	
2013–14	5	1ª Reg.	3rd	
2014–15	4	3ª	3rd	
2015–16	4	3ª	3rd	
2016–17	3	2ª B	18th	
2017–18	5	1ª Reg.	11th	
2018–19	5	1ª Reg.	(R)	

- 1 season in Segunda División B
- 3 seasons in Tercera División

=== Detailed list of seasons ===
Season	League											Cup	Copa Federación	
Season	Tier	Division	Gr	Pos	Pld	W	D	L	GF	GA	Pts	Cup	Copa Federación	
2011–12	6	Provincial		2nd	32	21	5	6	60	28	68			
2012–13	5	1ª Reg	A	7th	34	17	6	11	56	45	57			
2013–14	5	1ª Reg	A	3rd	32	19	6	7	66	26	63			
2014–15	4	3ª División	8	3rd	38	16	17	5	62	36	65		Regional tournament	3rd
2014–15	4	3ª División	PO		4	1	2	1	6	5			Regional tournament	3rd
2015–16	4	3ª División	8	3rd	38	23	6	9	64	26	75			
2015–16	4	3ª División	PO		6	4	0	2	9	4				
2016–17	3	2ª División B	1	18th	38	10	8	20	26	60	38			
2017–18	5	1ª Reg	A	11th	34	13	8	13	54	57	44			

== Current squad ==
As of 7 March 2017

Note: Flags indicate national team as defined under FIFA eligibility rules; some limited exceptions apply. Players may hold more than one non-FIFA nationality.

No.	Pos.	Nation	Player
—	GK	ESP	Alejandro
—	GK	ESP	Pablo Carmona
—	DF	ESP	Pablo Gallardo
—	DF	ESP	Acoidán
—	DF	ESP	José Carrasco
—	DF	ARG	Angelo Macaroni
—	DF	ESP	Héctor Sánchez
—	MF	ESP	Ibón Gutiérrez
—	MF	ESP	Adri González
—	MF	ESP	Xavi Moré
—	MF	ESP	Asier Arranz

No.	Pos.	Nation	Player
—	MF	ESP	Pablo Navas
—	MF	ESP	Chuchi
—	MF	ESP	Joseba Garmendia
—	MF	ESP	Pelayo
—	MF	ARG	Federico Inestal
—	MF	ESP	Álex Rabadán
—	FW	ESP	Juan Roldán
—	FW	ESP	Rodri
—	FW	ESP	Guillem Martí
—	FW	ESP	Diego Torres

== See also ==
- Palencia CF (I)
- CF Palencia
- Palencia CF
