= Diego Torres (footballer, born 1978) =

Spanish footballer

Personal information
- Full name: Diego Torres Rodríguez
- Date of birth: 19 September 1978 (age 48)
- Place of birth: Valladolid, Spain
- Height: 1.80 m (5 ft 11 in)
- Position: Striker

Senior career*
Years	Team	Apps	(Gls)
1998–1999	Extremadura	1	(0)
1999–2002	Levante	19	(2)
1999	→ Ontinyent (loan)	14	(6)
2000–2001	→ Sabadell (loan)	35	(19)
2002–2003	Ciudad Murcia	19	(6)
2003	Novelda	15	(6)
2003–2006	Gimnàstic	111	(40)
2006–2008	Rayo Vallecano	45	(10)
2008	→ Salamanca (loan)	9	(0)
2008–2010	Badalona	67	(10)
2010–2011	Barakaldo	35	(8)
2011–2012	Badajoz	33	(13)
2012–2013	UCAM Murcia	19	(5)
2013–2014	Cultural Leonesa	34	(12)
2014–2018	Palencia	114	(60)
2018–2022	Betis Valladolid	74	(42)
Total		644	(239)
- * Club domestic league appearances and goals

Diego Torres Rodríguez (born 19 September 1978) is a Spanish former professional footballer who played as a striker.

== Club career ==
Torres was born in Valladolid, Castile and León. His La Liga input consisted of seven minutes for CF Extremadura in a 1–0 win against RCD Mallorca, on 3 January 1999.

Over five seasons, Torres amassed Segunda División totals of 103 matches and 21 goals, with Levante UD, Gimnàstic de Tarragona and UD Salamanca. After scoring a career-best 20 times to help the second club to promotion from Segunda División B in 2003–04 he netted 12 the following campaign, adding seven in 2005–06 as they returned to the top flight after 56 years as runners-up.

Torres continued to play well into his 40s, representing teams in the third tier but also in the Tercera División and amateur football.
