= Javito (footballer, born 1998) =

Spanish footballer

Personal information
- Full name: Javier López Abadias
- Date of birth: 18 December 1998 (age 27)
- Place of birth: Huesca, Spain
- Height: 1.80 m (5 ft 11 in)
- Position: Centre back

Team information
- Current team: Unión Adarve
- Number: 8

Youth career
- Huesca

Senior career*
Years	Team	Apps	(Gls)
2016–2019	Almudévar	70	(3)
2017	Huesca	1	(0)
2019–2022	Cacereño	45	(2)
2022–2023	Brea	28	(0)
2023–2025	Barbastro	65	(0)
2025–	Unión Adarve	4	(0)
- * Club domestic league appearances and goals as of 28 September 2025

Javier López Abadias (born 18 December 1998), commonly known as Javito, is a Spanish footballer who plays for Tercera Federación club Unión Adarve. Mainly a centre back, he can play in all positions across the back four and as a defensive midfielder.

== Club career ==
Born in Huesca, Aragon, Javito finished his formation with SD Huesca. He made his senior debut with the farm team in 2016, in the Tercera División.

Javito made his professional debut on 26 March 2017, coming on as a late substitute for Samu Sáiz in a 3–1 away win against CD Mirandés in the Segunda División. On 25 July 2019, he moved to fourth-tier side CP Cacereño.
