= David Lázaro =

Spanish footballer

Personal information
- Full name: David Lázaro Alonso
- Date of birth: 1 June 1985 (age 41)
- Place of birth: Cabanillas, Spain
- Height: 1.76 m (5 ft 9 1/2 in)
- Position: Midfielder

Team information
- Current team: Peña Sport (assistant coach)

Youth career
- Osasuna

Senior career*
Years	Team	Apps	(Gls)
2003–2006	Osasuna B	80	(0)
2006–2007	Lleida	34	(1)
2007–2010	Villarreal B	68	(3)
2010–2011	Castellón	31	(0)
2011–2012	Alavés	34	(2)
2012–2013	Salamanca	37	(2)
2013–2014	Badalona	27	(1)
2014–2020	Tudelano	174	(0)

Managerial career
- 2021–2025: Subiza (assistant)
- 2025–: Peña Sport (assistant)
- * Club domestic league appearances and goals

David Lázaro Alonso (born 1 June 1985) is a Spanish football coach and a former defensive midfielder who is an assistant coach with Tercera Federación club Peña Sport.
