= Javier Almerge =

Spanish footballer

Personal information
- Full name: Javier Almerge Viñuales
- Date of birth: 28 February 2001 (age 25)
- Place of birth: Sena, Spain
- Position: Right back

Team information
- Current team: Huesca B

Youth career
- Peñas Sariñena
- 2015–2020: Huesca

Senior career*
| Years | Team | Apps | (Gls) |
| 2017–2019 | Almudévar | 52 | (4) |
| 2018– | Huesca | 0 | (0) |
| 2020– | Huesca B | 0 | (0) |

International career
| 2018 | Spain U17 | 1 | (0) |
- * Club domestic league appearances and goals as of 2 December 2018

Javier Almerge Viñuales (born 28 February 2001) is a Spanish professional footballer who plays for SD Huesca B as a right back.

== Club career ==
Born in Sena, Huesca, Aragon, Almerge graduated with SD Huesca's youth setup. On 10 September 2017, aged just 16, he made his debut as a senior by coming on as a late substitute with the farm team in a 3–1 home win against CD Robres in the Tercera División.

Despite being only 17, Almerge finished his first senior campaign with 21 appearances, with more than 1,500 minutes of action. He made his first-team debut on 6 December 2018, starting in a 0–4 home loss against Athletic Bilbao in the season's Copa del Rey.
