= José Carrasco (footballer, born 1988) =

Spanish footballer

Personal information
- Full name: José Manuel Carrasco Correa
- Date of birth: 27 January 1988 (age 38)
- Place of birth: Antequera, Spain
- Height: 1.87 m (6 ft 2 in)
- Position: Centre back

Youth career
- Fuengirola
- Albacete

Senior career*
Years	Team	Apps	(Gls)
2007–2010	Villarreal C	90	(3)
2009	Villarreal B	1	(0)
2010–2011	Benidorm	36	(1)
2011–2012	Écija	21	(0)
2012–2013	Murcia B	26	(3)
2012	Murcia	1	(0)
2013–2014	Johor II		
2014–2015	Mérida	8	(0)
2015–2016	Fuenlabrada	29	(2)
2016	Saburtalo	10	(0)
2017	Palencia	17	(0)
2017–2018	Ontinyent	34	(1)
2018–2021	Linense	69	(0)
2021–2023	Ceuta	43	(0)
2023–2025	Marbella	65	(3)
- * Club domestic league appearances and goals

José Manuel Carrasco Correa (born 27 January 1988) is a Spanish former footballer who played as a central defender.
