= Emmanuel Attipoe =

Ghanaian footballer (born 2000)

Personal information
- Full name: Emmanuel Amoh Attipoe
- Date of birth: 22 June 2000 (age 26)
- Place of birth: Accra, Ghana
- Height: 1.78 m (5 ft 10 in)
- Position: Right back

Team information
- Current team: Ebro
- Number: 17

Youth career
- Liberty Professionals
- → Extremadura (loan)

Senior career*
Years	Team	Apps	(Gls)
2018–2019	Liberty Professionals	14	(0)
2018–2019	→ Extremadura B (loan)	4	(0)
2019–2020	Extremadura B	25	(0)
2019–2022	Extremadura	18	(0)
2022–2023	Albacete	16	(0)
2023	→ Logroñés (loan)	8	(0)
2024	Azuaga	17	(2)
2024–2025	Don Benito	30	(0)
2025–	Ebro	26	(0)
- * Club domestic league appearances and goals as of 14 May 2026

Emmanuel Amoh Attipoe (born 22 June 2000) is a Ghanaian professional footballer who plays for Spanish Segunda Federación club Ebro. Mainly a right back, he can also play as a right winger.

== Career ==
=== Liberty Professionals ===
A Liberty Professionals youth graduate, Attipoe made his first team debut on 28 March 2018, playing the last 20 minutes in a 2–0 away loss against International Allies. He played in all matches for the club during the campaign and made 3 assists before the league was halted.

=== Extremadura ===
On 6 September 2018, he was loaned to Spanish club Extremadura UD and was initially assigned to the youth setup. Attipoe made his debut abroad on 23 February 2019, starting with the reserves in a 3–1 away win against CD Valdelacalzada. On 24 May, he signed a permanent contract with the club.

Attipoe made his first team debut for Extremadura on 8 June 2019, coming on as a second-half substitute for Kike Márquez in a 0–0 Segunda División home draw against RCD Mallorca. In the following two seasons, he was successfully converted into a right back, but left the club in January 2022 as their financial situation worsened.

=== Albacete ===
On 10 January 2022, Attipoe signed a four-and-a-half-year contract with fellow Primera División RFEF side Albacete Balompié. He shared the starting spot with Diego Johannesson, contributing with 17 appearances (play-offs included) as his side returned to the second level at first attempt.

On 30 January 2023, after being rarely used, Attipoe moved on loan to UD Logroñés until the end of the 2022–23 Primera Federación.
