= Isla (Cantabria) =

- Village
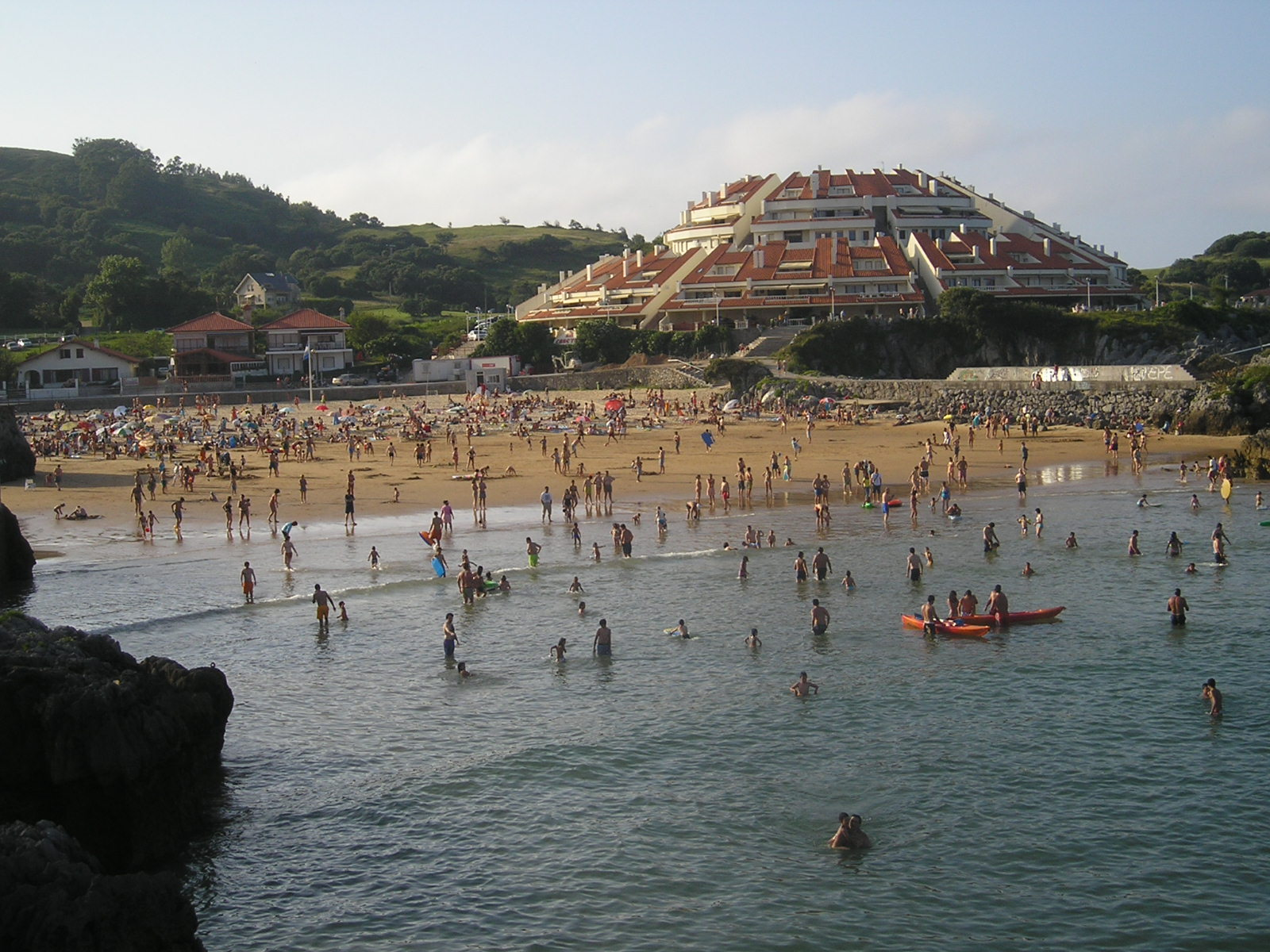
- Isla e Isla Playa, Arnuero

- Location within Spain
- Coordinates: 43°29′36″N 3°34′09″W
- Country: Spain
- Autonomous community: Cantabria
- Municipality: Arnuero

Population (2004)
  - Total: 935

Isla is a small village in the municipality of Arnuero in Cantabria, Spain together with other settlements, such as Soane, Castillo Siete Villas and Arnuero. It is in the region of Trasmiera.

== Location ==
The village is located in northern Cantabria, bounded by the Bay of Biscay to the north, the river Rio Campiazo and the town of Joyel Noja to the east, the estuary and the town of Ajo to the west, and Mount Cinch and Arnuero in the south. Isla is 2.4 kilometres from Arnuero, 25 meters above sea level.

== Tourism ==
The main economic activity of the town is tourism. In 2004, it had 935 inhabitants. The influx of tourists, however, usually makes the population rise in the summer months.

Isla regularly attracts tourists, mainly from Spain, however there are often trips from the UK.
