= AD Almudévar =

Association football club in Spain

Almudévar
- Full name: Agrupación Deportiva Almudévar
- Founded: 1965
- Ground: La Corona, Almudévar, Aragon, Spain
- Capacity: 2,000
- President: Juan Antonio Sagardoy
- Head coach: Carlos Gállego
- League: Tercera Federación – Group 17
- 2025–26: Tercera Federación – Group 17, 9th of 18
Home colours	Away colours

Agrupación Deportiva Almudévar is a Spanish football team based in Almudévar, in the autonomous community of Aragon. Founded in 1965, it plays in Tercera Federación – Group 17, holding home matches at Estadio Virgen de la Corona.

The club was a reserve team of SD Huesca from 2011 to 2019.

== Season to season ==
Season	Tier	Division	Place	Copa del Rey
1966–67	5	1ª Reg.	7th	
1967–68	5	1ª Reg.	6th	
1968–69	5	Reg. Pref.	11th	
1969–70	5	Reg. Pref.	10th	
1970–71	5	Reg. Pref.	20th	
1971–72	5	1ª Reg.	14th	
1972–73	5	1ª Reg.	12th	
1973–74	5	1ª Reg.	16th	
1974–75	5	1ª Reg.	3rd	
1975–76	4	Reg. Pref.	19th	
1976–77	5	1ª Reg.	9th	
1977–78	6	1ª Reg.	16th	
1978–79	6	1ª Reg.	4th	
1979–80	6	1ª Reg.	2nd	
1980–81	5	Reg. Pref.	18th	
1981–82	6	1ª Reg.	2nd	
1982–83	5	Reg. Pref.	17th	
1983–84	6	1ª Reg.	2nd	
1984–85	6	1ª Reg.	6th	
1985–86	6	1ª Reg.	3rd	

Season	Tier	Division	Place	Copa del Rey
1986–87	5	Reg. Pref.	16th	
1987–88	5	Reg. Pref.	5th	
1988–89	5	Reg. Pref.	1st	
1989–90	4	3ª	15th	
1990–91	4	3ª	19th	
1991–92	5	Reg. Pref.	9th	
1992–93	5	Reg. Pref.	13th	
1993–94	5	Reg. Pref.	4th	
1994–95	5	Reg. Pref.	5th	
1995–96	5	Reg. Pref.	5th	
1996–97	5	Reg. Pref.	9th	
1997–98	5	Reg. Pref.	16th	
1998–99	6	1ª Reg.	9th	
1999–2000	6	1ª Reg.	9th	
2000–01	6	1ª Reg.	1st	
2001–02	5	Reg. Pref.	7th	
2002–03	5	Reg. Pref.	10th	
2003–04	5	Reg. Pref.	10th	
2004–05	5	Reg. Pref.	11th	
2005–06	5	Reg. Pref.	16th	

Season	Tier	Division	Place	Copa del Rey
2006–07	6	1ª Reg.	2nd	
2007–08	5	Reg. Pref.	13th	
2008–09	5	Reg. Pref.	16th	
2009–10	6	1ª Reg.	1st	
2010–11	5	Reg. Pref.	13th	
2011–12	5	Reg. Pref.	1st	N/A (Note: Reserve team of Huesca.)
2012–13	4	3ª	16th	N/A
2013–14	4	3ª	4th	N/A
2014–15	4	3ª	8th	N/A
2015–16	4	3ª	7th	N/A
2016–17	4	3ª	7th	N/A
2017–18	4	3ª	8th	N/A
2018–19	4	3ª	10th	N/A
2019–20	4	3ª	21st	
2020–21	4	3ª	10th / 6th	
2021–22	6	Reg. Pref.	1st	
2022–23	5	3ª Fed.	6th	
2023–24	5	3ª Fed.	6th	
2024–25	5	3ª Fed.	13th	
2025–26	5	3ª Fed.	9th	
2026–27	5	3ª Fed.		

- 11 seasons in Tercera División
- 5 seasons in Tercera Federación

== Current squad ==
As of 18 February 2018

Note: Flags indicate national team as defined under FIFA eligibility rules; some limited exceptions apply. Players may hold more than one non-FIFA nationality.

No.	Pos.	Nation	Player
—	GK	ESP	Antonio Valera
—	GK	ESP	Pablo Sanz
—	GK	ESP	Víctor Otín
—	DF	ESP	Javito
—	DF	ESP	Jorge Medrano
—	DF	ESP	Álex García
—	DF	ESP	Javier Almerge
—	DF	ESP	Yeray
—	DF	ESP	Christian Belenchón
—	MF	ESP	Gustavo Abizanda
—	MF	ESP	Jorge Conte

No.	Pos.	Nation	Player
—	MF	ESP	Carlos Calvo
—	MF	ESP	Jaime Ara
—	MF	ESP	Fernando Arnedillo
—	MF	BRA	Cristian Vieira
—	MF	ESP	Nacho Calderón
—	FW	ESP	Iván Cabellud
—	FW	ESP	Sergio Sánchez
—	FW	ESP	Christian Dieste
—	FW	ESP	Álvaro Barrero
—	FW	ESP	Gabi
