= Arnuero =

- Municipality
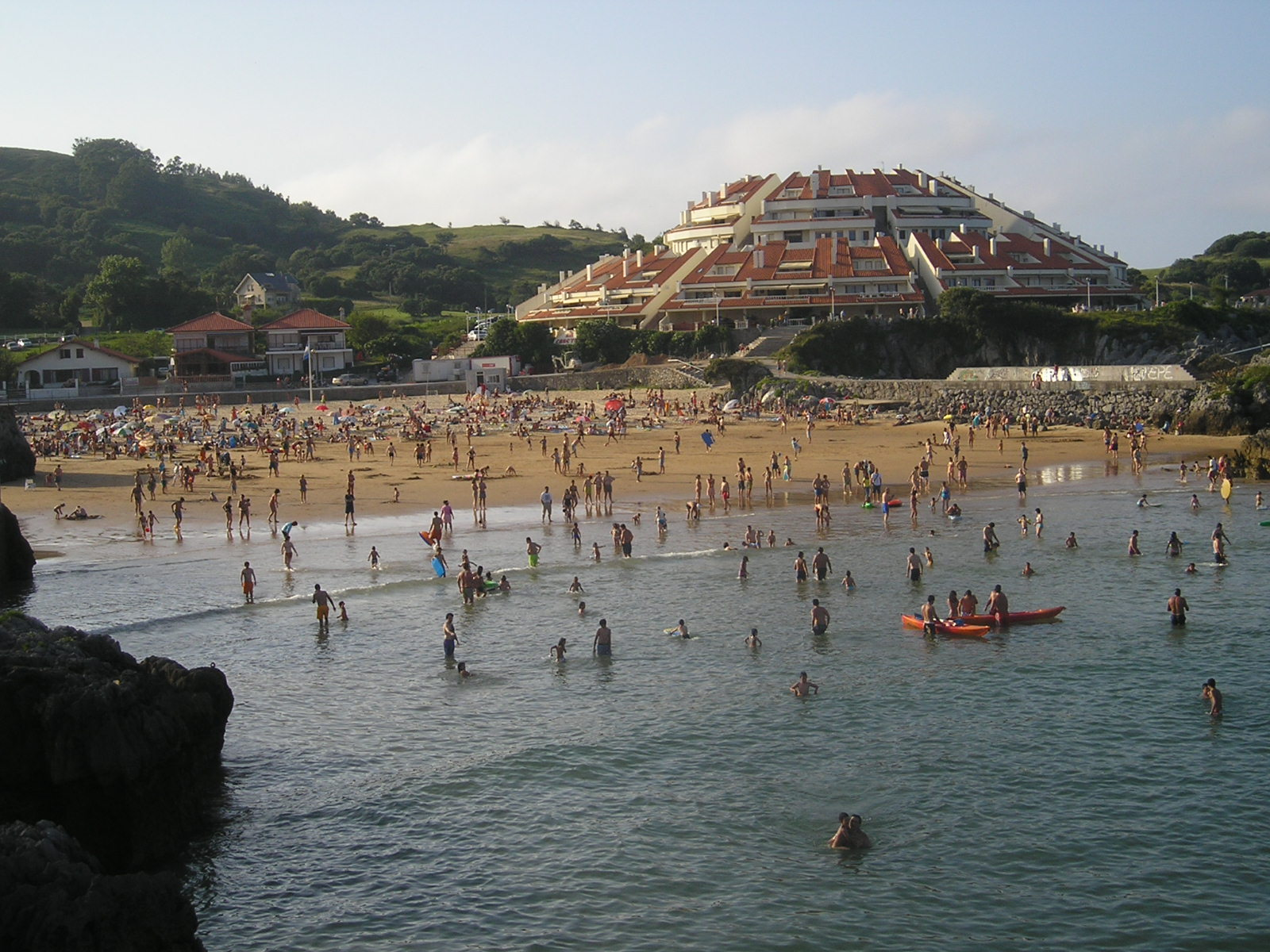
- Isla and Isla Playa, Arnuero

- Flag Coat of arms

- Location within Cantabria Arnuero (Spain)
- Coordinates: 43°28′23″N 3°33′47″W
- Country: Spain
- Autonomous community: Cantabria
- Province: Cantabria
- Comarca: Trasmiera
- Judicial district: Santoña
- Capital: Arnuero

Government
  - Alcalde: José Manuel Igual Ortiz (2007) (PP)

Area
  - Total: 24.66 km^{2} (9.52 sq mi)
- Elevation: 24 m (79 ft)

Population (2025-01-01)
  - Total: 2,300
  - Density: 93/km^{2} (240/sq mi)
- Time zone: UTC+1 (CET)
  - Summer (DST): UTC+2 (CEST)
- Postal code: 39195
- Website: Official website

Arnuero is a municipality in the province and autonomous community of Cantabria, northern Spain.

The municipality is located in the northeastern portion of the province, and includes three small villages : Arnuero, Soano and Isla. Isla has two seaside districts, popular tourism destinations, Quejo (Cape Quejo) and Playa la Arena.

== Towns ==
- Arnuero (Capital)
- Castillo Siete Villas
- Isla e Isla Playa
- Soano
