= CD Ebro =

Spanish football club

Coordinates: 41.661465°N 0.893752°W

Ebro
- Full name: Club Deportivo Ebro
- Nickname: Arlequinados
- Founded: 1942; 84 years ago (refounded in 1961)
- Stadium: Campo Municipal de Fútbol La Almozara
- Capacity: 1,000
- Owner: Javier Borao
- President: Luis Belsué
- Head coach: Javier Genovés
- League: Segunda Federación – Group 2
- 2025–26: Segunda Federación – Group 2, 8th of 18
- Website: cdebro.com
Home colours	Away colours

Club Deportivo Ebro is a Spanish football club in Zaragoza, in the autonomous community of Aragon. Founded in 1942, it plays in Segunda Federación – Group 2, holding home games at Campo Municipal de Fútbol La Almozara, which has a capacity of 1,000 seats.

== History ==
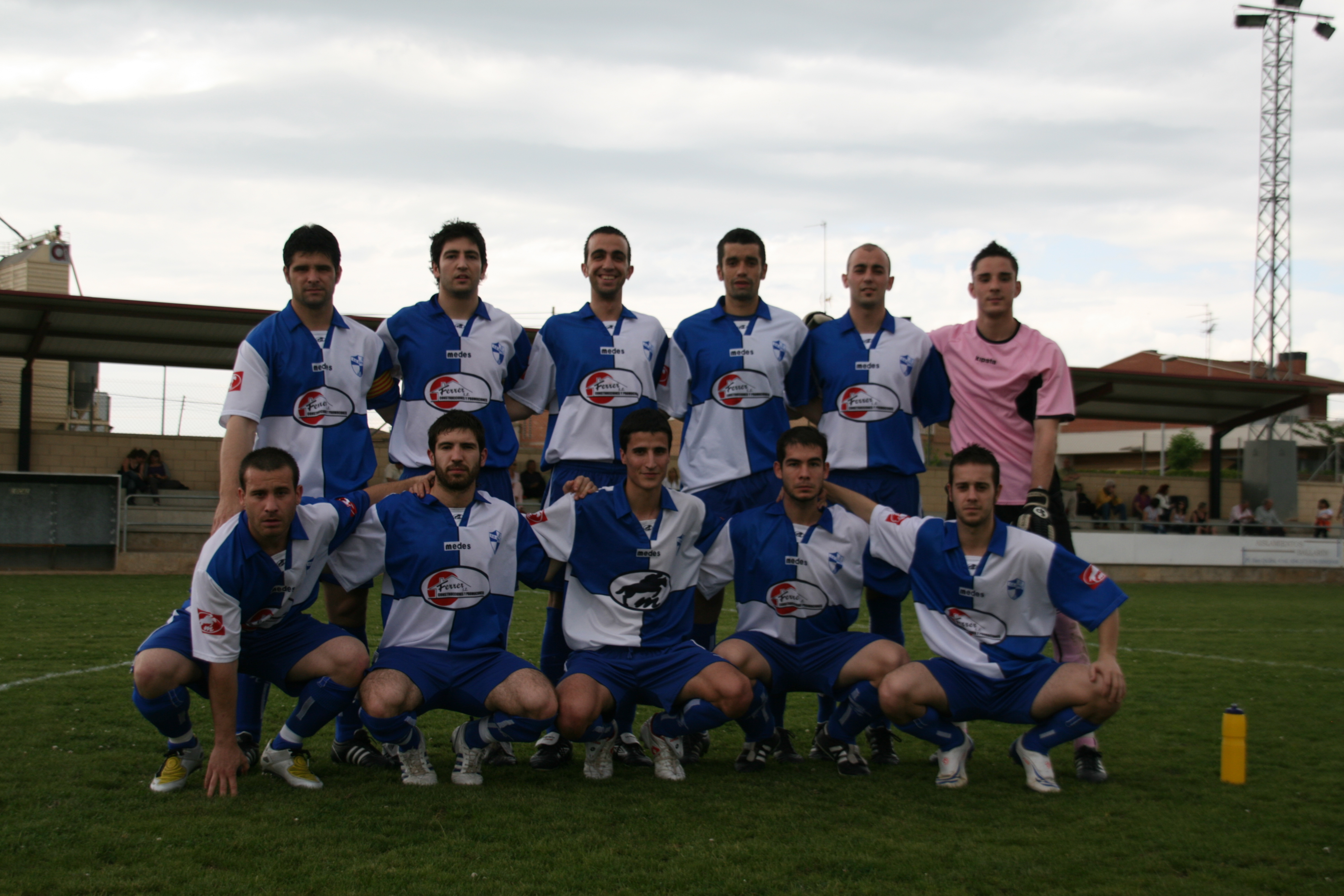
A lineup for a match in the 2008–09 season.

Club Deportivo Ebro was founded in two stages. Firstly, in 1942 by Mr. Calavia, competing in the Amateur Championship, since there was no Federation. Second, before the 1961-62 season the enthusiastic fans such as Victoriano Herrando and Domingo Vela (who were club's presidents), Santiago Sediles, Paulino Larena, José Cester, José Gallén, Armando Guerra and other members of the Board of Directors reestablished the club. In the 1970s the club played its home matches in different stadiums in Zaragoza such as Campo de Picarral and Campo de Miralbueno. The club successfully reached promotion to the Primera Regional with José Luis Bailera Martínez as a president.

In 2015, CD Ebro promoted for the first time to Segunda División B after beating CD Varea in the promotion playoffs.

== Stadium ==
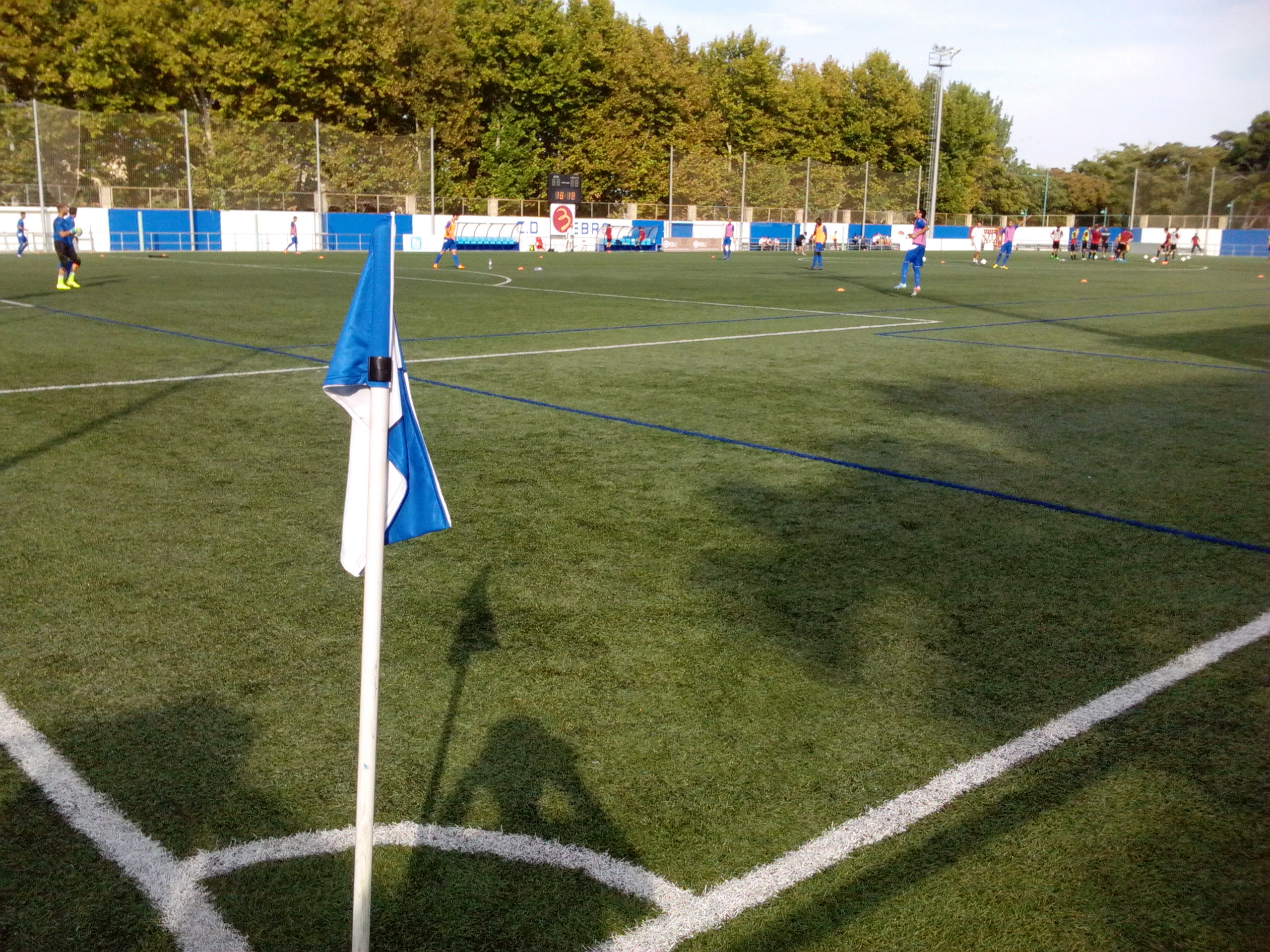
Campo de La Almozara.

Ebro played its home games until 2019 in La Almozara.

In 2019, the club agreed with the Aragonese Football Federation the use of the Estadio Pedro Sancho for the 2019–20 season.

== Seasons ==
Season	Tier	Division	Place	Copa del Rey
1942–43	6	3ª Reg.	6th	
1943–44	5	2ª Reg.	3rd	
1944–45	5	2ª Reg.	2nd	
1945–46	5	2ª Reg.	8th	
1946–47	5	2ª Reg.	7th	
1947–48	5	2ª Reg.	3rd	
1948–49	4	1ª Reg.	6th	
1949–1965	DNP			
1965–66	5	2ª Reg.	6th	
1966–67	5	2ª Reg.	4th	
1967–68	5	2ª Reg.	5th	
1968–69	6	2ª Reg.	6th	
1969–70	DNP			
1970–71	6	2ª Reg.	6th	
1971–72	6	2ª Reg.	3rd	
1972–73	7	2ª Reg.	2nd	
1973–74	7	2ª Reg.	5th	
1974–75	8	3ª Reg.	1st	
1975–76	7	2ª Reg.	11th	
1976–77	7	2ª Reg.	12th	

Season	Tier	Division	Place	Copa del Rey
1977–78	8	2ª Reg.	5th	
1978–79	7	2ª Reg.	6th	
1979–80	7	2ª Reg.	2nd	
1980–81	6	1ª Reg.	19th	
1981–82	7	2ª Reg.	6th	
1982–83	7	2ª Reg.	12th	
1983–84	7	2ª Reg.	7th	
1984–85	7	2ª Reg.	8th	
1985–86	7	2ª Reg.	7th	
1986–87	7	2ª Reg.	1st	
1987–88	6	1ª Reg.	1st	
1988–89	5	Reg. Pref.	8th	
1989–90	5	Reg. Pref.	1st	
1990–91	4	3ª	11th	
1991–92	4	3ª	10th	
1992–93	4	3ª	9th	
1993–94	4	3ª	19th	
1994–95	5	Reg. Pref.	4th	
1995–96	5	Reg. Pref.	2nd	
1996–97	4	3ª	18th	

Season	Tier	Division	Place	Copa del Rey
1997–98	5	Reg. Pref.	7th	
1998–99	5	Reg. Pref.	2nd	
1999–2000	4	3ª	15th	
2000–01	4	3ª	12th	
2001–02	4	3ª	4th	
2002–03	4	3ª	11th	
2003–04	4	3ª	12th	
2004–05	4	3ª	14th	
2005–06	4	3ª	11th	
2006–07	4	3ª	11th	
2007–08	4	3ª	17th	
2008–09	5	Reg. Pref.	4th	
2009–10	5	Reg. Pref.	1st	
2010–11	4	3ª	13th	
2011–12	4	3ª	12th	
2012–13	4	3ª	3rd	
2013–14	4	3ª	13th	
2014–15	4	3ª	1st	
2015–16	3	2ª B	10th	Third round
2016–17	3	2ª B	12th	

Season	Tier	Division	Place	Copa del Rey
2017–18	3	2ª B	6th	
2018–19	3	2ª B	9th	Round of 32
2019–20	3	2ª B	11th	Round of 32
2020–21	3	2ª B	4th	
2021–22	4	2ª RFEF	9th	First round
2022–23	4	2ª Fed.	18th	
2023–24	5	3ª Fed.	3rd	
2024–25	5	3ª Fed.	1st	
2025–26	4	2ª Fed.	8th	Second round
2026–27	4	2ª Fed.		

- 6 seasons in Segunda División B
- 4 seasons in Segunda Federación/Segunda División RFEF
- 19 seasons in Tercera División
- 2 seasons in Tercera Federación

== Squad ==
As of 1 March 2026

Note: Flags indicate national team as defined under FIFA eligibility rules; some limited exceptions apply. Players may hold more than one non-FIFA nationality.

No.	Pos.	Nation	Player
1	GK	ESP	Mateo Lite
2	DF	ESP	Diego Rosado
3	DF	ESP	Nacho Uche
4	DF	ESP	Iván Pérez
5	DF	ESP	Héctor Espiérrez
6	MF	ESP	Alejandro Muñoz
7	FW	ESP	Marc Prat
8	MF	ARG	Nico Magno
9	FW	ESP	Kevin Sánchez
10	FW	ESP	Paki

No.	Pos.	Nation	Player
11	FW	ESP	Víctor Charlez
12	MF	ESP	Jaime Requés
13	GK	ESP	Aitor Mujica
15	DF	ESP	Javi Hernández
17	DF	GHA	Emmanuel Attipoe
20	DF	ESP	Sergio Escolar
18	FW	ESP	Álvaro Hermida
19	FW	ESP	Kevin Soeiro
21	MF	ESP	Álvaro Novials
—	MF	ESP	Álex Vela

== See also ==
- CD Robres, reserve team
