= Diego Carrillo =

Spanish footballer

Personal information
- Full name: Diego Carrillo Pendas
- Date of birth: 25 September 1982 (age 44)
- Place of birth: Barcelona, Spain
- Height: 1.80 m (5 ft 11 in)
- Position: Midfielder

Youth career
- Granollers

Senior career*
Years	Team	Apps	(Gls)
2000–2001	Granollers	14	(2)
2001–2004	Sabadell	71	(2)
2004–2005	Hospitalet	35	(10)
2005	Lleida	3	(0)
2006	Hospitalet	15	(1)
2006–2007	Figueres	31	(1)
2007–2008	Sabadell	32	(4)
2008–2010	Talavera		
2010–2012	Toledo	30	(0)
2012	Puertollano		
2012–2014	Rabat Ajax	47	(7)
2014–2016	Castellón	50	(5)
2016–2018	Granollers	41	(5)
2018	Vilassar de Mar	10	(0)
2018	Manresa	8	(0)
2018–2020	Cardedeu	40	(15)
2020–2021	Les Franqueses	16	(0)
- * Club domestic league appearances and goals

Diego Carrillo Pendas (born 25 September 1982) is a Spanish former footballer who played as a midfielder.
