= Condal Club =

Association football club in Spain

Condal
- Full name: Condal Club
- Founded: 1940 (refounded in 1968)
- Ground: Alejandro Ortea, Noreña, Asturias, Spain
- Capacity: 2,000
- Chairman: Andrés Suárez
- Manager: Daniel Roces
- League: Tercera Federación – Group 2
- 2025–26: Primera Asturfútbol, 2nd of 19 (promoted)
Home colours	Away colours

Condal Club, sometimes referred as Condal Club de Fútbol, is a football team based in Noreña in the autonomous community of Asturias. Founded in 1940, the team plays in Tercera Federación – Group 2.

== History ==
The club was founded in 1940 as Club Condal. It played during three seasons in Tercera División before disappearing in 1964.

In 1968, the club was re-founded as Condal Club, and played in Regional divisions until 2001, when it promoted to Tercera División. Condal won its first Tercera División championship in the 2014–15 season, and qualified for the 2015 promotion playoffs to Segunda División B.

== Season to season ==
=== As Club Condal ===
Season	Tier	Division	Place	Copa del Rey
1940–1951		Regional	—	
1951–52	5	2ª Reg.	6th	
1952–53	5	2ª Reg.	5th	
1953–54	5	2ª Reg.	1st	
1954–55	5	2ª Reg.	1st	
1955–56	4	1ª Reg.	1st	
1956–57	3	3ª	5th	

Season	Tier	Division	Place	Copa del Rey
1957–58	3	3ª	10th	
1958–59	3	3ª	16th	
1959–60	4	1ª Reg.	4th	
1960–61	4	1ª Reg.	5th	
1961–62	4	1ª Reg.	8th	
1962–63	4	1ª Reg.	8th	
1963–64	4	1ª Reg.	3rd	

=== As Condal Club ===
Season	Tier	Division	Place	Copa del Rey
1969–70	5	2ª Reg.	4th	
1970–71	5	2ª Reg.	8th	
1971–72	5	2ª Reg.	14th	
1972–73	5	2ª Reg.	2nd	
1973–74	5	2ª Reg. P.	2nd	
1974–75	5	Reg. Pref.	15th	
1975–76	5	Reg. Pref.	19th	
1976–77	5	2ª Reg. P.	7th	
1977–78	6	2ª Reg. P.	13th	
1978–79	6	1ª Reg.	18th	
1979–80	6	1ª Reg.	16th	
1980–81	6	1ª Reg.	16th	
1981–82	6	1ª Reg.	5th	
1982–83	6	1ª Reg.	15th	
1983–84	6	1ª Reg.	19th	
1984–85	6	1ª Reg.	8th	
1985–86	7	2ª Reg.	2nd	
1986–87	6	1ª Reg.	8th	
1987–88	6	1ª Reg.	6th	
1988–89	6	1ª Reg.	1st	

Season	Tier	Division	Place	Copa del Rey
1989–90	5	Reg. Pref.	16th	
1990–91	5	Reg. Pref.	14th	
1991–92	5	Reg. Pref.	11th	
1992–93	5	Reg. Pref.	20th	
1993–94	6	1ª Reg.	15th	
1994–95	6	1ª Reg.	7th	
1995–96	6	1ª Reg.	6th	
1996–97	6	1ª Reg.	1st	
1997–98	5	Reg. Pref.	15th	
1998–99	5	Reg. Pref.	12th	
1999–2000	5	Reg. Pref.	16th	
2000–01	5	Reg. Pref.	3rd	
2001–02	4	3ª	16th	
2002–03	4	3ª	12th	
2003–04	4	3ª	18th	
2004–05	5	Reg. Pref.	2nd	
2005–06	4	3ª	13th	
2006–07	4	3ª	11th	
2007–08	4	3ª	17th	
2008–09	4	3ª	12th	

Season	Tier	Division	Place	Copa del Rey
2009–10	4	3ª	12th	
2010–11	4	3ª	6th	
2011–12	4	3ª	5th	
2012–13	4	3ª	8th	
2013–14	4	3ª	10th	
2014–15	4	3ª	1st	
2015–16	4	3ª	8th	First round
2016–17	4	3ª	8th	
2017–18	4	3ª	14th	
2018–19	4	3ª	11th	
2019–20	4	3ª	10th	
2020–21	4	3ª	7th / 5th	
2021–22	6	Reg. Pref.	2nd	
2022–23	5	3ª Fed.	14th	
2023–24	5	3ª Fed.	14th	
2024–25	5	3ª Fed.	17th	
2025–26	6	1ª Astur.	2nd	
2026–27	5	3ª Fed.		

- 22 seasons in Tercera División
- 4 seasons in Tercera Federación

== First team squad ==
Note: Flags indicate national team as defined under FIFA eligibility rules; some limited exceptions apply. Players may hold more than one non-FIFA nationality.

No.	Pos.	Nation	Player
—	GK	ESP	Emi
—	GK	ESP	Iván
—	DF	ESP	Germán
—	DF	ESP	Javi González
—	DF	ESP	Javi Toyos
—	DF	ESP	Mario
—	DF	ESP	Mori
—	DF	ESP	Rufi
—	DF	ESP	Trubi
—	MF	ESP	Aitor
—	MF	ESP	Diego López

No.	Pos.	Nation	Player
—	MF	ESP	Falo
—	MF	ESP	Herrero
—	MF	ESP	Jairo
—	MF	ESP	Jorge Valiente
—	MF	ESP	Óscar
—	FW	ESP	Bruno
—	FW	ESP	Humberto
—	FW	ESP	Nando Cazorla
—	FW	ESP	Patón
—	FW	ESP	René

== Colours ==
- Home colours: Red shirt, blue shorts and red socks.
- Away colours: Blue shirt, blue shorts and blue socks.

== Stadium ==
The club's home ground is Alejandro Ortea, which has a capacity of 2,000 spectators.

== Women's team ==
Condal created a women's football team in 2017. It started competing in the Regional league.

=== Season by season ===
Season	Division	Place	Copa de la Reina
2017/18	Regional	11th	
2018/19	Regional	6th	
2019/20	Regional	3rd	
