= Jorge Merino =

Spanish footballer

Personal information
- Full name: Jorge Merino Mazón
- Date of birth: 10 June 1991 (age 35)
- Place of birth: Santander, Spain
- Height: 1.79 m (5 ft 10 1/2 in)
- Position: Midfielder

Team information
- Current team: Serpentara

Youth career
- 2001–2009: Racing Santander
- 2009–2010: Atlético Madrid

Senior career*
Years	Team	Apps	(Gls)
2010–2011	Noja	19	(1)
2011–2012	Vimenor	12	(0)
2012–2014	Recreativo B	69	(3)
2013	Recreativo	1	(0)
2014–2015	Marino	27	(2)
2015–	Serpentara		
- * Club domestic league appearances and goals as of 17 May 2015

Jorge Merino Mazón (born 10 June 1991) is a Spanish footballer who have played for Italian club A.S.D. Serpentara Bellegra as a midfielder. Right now is a teacher of philosophy on IES. Marqués de Santillana, Torrelavega, and football player of Tropezón.g

== Football career ==
Born in Santander, Cantabria. Merino graduated from Atlético Madrid, and spent his first year as a senior with local SD Noja. In the 2011 summer he moved to CF Vimenor, also in Tercera División.

On 27 January 2012 Merino joined Recreativo de Huelva, initially assigned to the reserves in the same division. On 8 June 2013 he first appeared for the main squad, playing roughly 20 minutes in a 0–0 home draw against SD Huesca in the Segunda División.

On 5 August 2014 Merino joined Segunda División B's Marino de Luanco. On 2 October of the following year he moved abroad for the first time in his career, joining Italian Serie D side A.S.D. Serpentara Bellegra.
