= Estadio Alejandro Ortea =

Football stadium in Noreña, Spain

Alejandro Ortea
- Interactive map of Alejandro Ortea
- Location: Noreña; Asturias; Spain
- Coordinates: 43°23′31″N 5°42′15″W
- Owner: Municipality of Noreña
- Operator: Condal Club
- Capacity: 2,000
- Surface: Grass
- Field size: 104 × 63

Construction
- Opened: September 1974

Alejandro Ortea is a football stadium in Noreña and is the home of Condal Club.

Nearly a change in its surface, artificial grass which was not caused by differences between the president of Condal Club, Miguel Ángel Redondo, and the municipality of Noreña. This ended with the resignation of the president of Condal.

The first match played in this stadium took place in September 1974, a Tercera División match between Condal Club and UD Gijón Industrial.
