= Albert Yagüe =

Spanish footballer

Personal information
- Full name: Albert Yagüe Jiménez
- Date of birth: 27 March 1985 (age 41)
- Place of birth: Vilassar de Mar, Spain
- Height: 1.75 m (5 ft 9 in)
- Position: Forward

Youth career
- 2000–2004: Espanyol

Senior career*
Years	Team	Apps	(Gls)
2003–2007	Espanyol B	54	(20)
2005–2007	Espanyol	1	(0)
2007	→ Lorca Deportiva (loan)	19	(0)
2007–2009	Eibar	58	(8)
2009–2010	Melilla	32	(9)
2010–2011	Cultural Leonesa	33	(5)
2011–2012	Dinamo Tbilisi	19	(2)
2012–2013	Atlético Baleares	0	(0)
2013	Badalona	12	(0)
2014–2015	Castellón	45	(11)
2015–2016	Sant Andreu	13	(5)
2016–2017	Castellón	25	(4)
2017	Torre Levante	11	(0)
2017–2018	Acero	20	(13)
2018–2019	Almassora	23	(4)
Total		365	(81)
- * Club domestic league appearances and goals

Albert Yagüe Jiménez (born 27 March 1985) is a Spanish former professional footballer who played as a forward.

== Club career ==
Born in Vilassar de Mar, Barcelona, Catalonia, Yagüe was a product of RCD Espanyol's youth system and made his only La Liga appearance on 18 September 2005, playing one minute in a 1–0 home win against Real Madrid after having come on as a substitute for Iván de la Peña. In January 2007, he joined Lorca Deportiva CF in the Segunda División on loan until 30 June.

In the summer of 2007, Yagüe was released by Espanyol and signed for another club in the second tier, SD Eibar, scoring four goals in his debut season. After missing a good part of the 2008–09 campaign due to injury, he moved to UD Melilla of Segunda División B in July 2009, as the Basques had also been relegated.

Yagüe spent 2011–12 with FC Dinamo Tbilisi in the Georgian Erovnuli Liga, where he played and scored in that season's UEFA Europa League.
