= Peña Sport FC =

Association football club in Spain

Peña Sport
- Full name: Peña Sport Fútbol Club
- Nickname: La Peña
- Founded: 1925; 101 years ago
- Stadium: Campo de San Francisco
- Capacity: 4,000
- President: Felipe Palacios
- Head coach: Jorge Sola
- League: Segunda Federación – Group 2
- 2025–26: Tercera Federación – Group 15, 1st of 18 (champions)
Home colours	Away colours

Peña Sport Fútbol Club is a Spanish football team based in Tafalla, in the chartered community of Navarre. Founded in 1925 it plays in Segunda Federación – Group 2, holding home matches at Campo de San Francisco, with a capacity of 4,000 seats.

== History ==
Peña Sport FC was founded in autumn of 1925 by merger of youth teams of the Tafalla city.

== Season to season ==
Season	Tier	Division	Place	Copa del Rey
1944–45	4	1ª Reg.	3rd	
1945–46	4	1ª Reg.	2nd	
1946–47	4	1ª Reg.	1st	
1947–48	4	1ª Reg.	9th	
1948–49	4	1ª Reg.	3rd	
1949–50	4	1ª Reg.	2nd	
1950–51	4	1ª Reg.	1st	
1951–52	4	1ª Reg.	2nd	
1952–53	4	1ª Reg.	2nd	
1953–54	4	1ª Reg.	1st	
1954–55	3	3ª	6th	
1955–56	3	3ª	8th	
1956–57	3	3ª	16th	
1957–58	4	1ª Reg.	10th	
1958–59	5	2ª Reg.	4th	
1959–60	4	1ª Reg.	14th	
1960–61	5	2ª Reg.	4th	
1961–62	5	2ª Reg.	3rd	
1962–63	4	1ª Reg.	4th	
1963–64	4	1ª Reg.	8th	

Season	Tier	Division	Place	Copa del Rey
1964–65	4	1ª Reg.	7th	
1965–66	4	1ª Reg.	8th	
1966–67	4	1ª Reg.	9th	
1967–68	4	1ª Reg.	2nd	
1968–69	4	1ª Reg.	3rd	
1969–70	4	1ª Reg.	7th	
1970–71	4	1ª Reg.	16th	
1971–72	5	2ª Reg.	2nd	
1972–73	4	1ª Reg.	2nd	
1973–74	3	3ª	17th	First round
1974–75	4	Reg. Pref.	2nd	
1975–76	4	Reg. Pref.	2nd	
1976–77	4	Reg. Pref.	1st	
1977–78	4	3ª	15th	Second round
1978–79	4	3ª	18th	First round
1979–80	4	3ª	6th	Third round
1980–81	4	3ª	5th	Second round
1981–82	4	3ª	7th	First round
1982–83	4	3ª	5th	
1983–84	4	3ª	15th	First round

Season	Tier	Division	Place	Copa del Rey
1984–85	4	3ª	10th	
1985–86	4	3ª	13th	
1986–87	4	3ª	12th	
1987–88	4	3ª	6th	
1988–89	4	3ª	4th	
1989–90	4	3ª	11th	
1990–91	4	3ª	3rd	
1991–92	4	3ª	4th	Second round
1992–93	4	3ª	1st	First round
1993–94	4	3ª	1st	
1994–95	4	3ª	2nd	
1995–96	4	3ª	3rd	
1996–97	4	3ª	1st	
1997–98	4	3ª	2nd	
1998–99	4	3ª	1st	
1999–2000	4	3ª	1st	
2000–01	3	2ª B	18th	Preliminary
2001–02	4	3ª	2nd	
2002–03	3	2ª B	14th	
2003–04	3	2ª B	16th	

Season	Tier	Division	Place	Copa del Rey
2004–05	3	2ª B	20th	
2005–06	4	3ª	1st	
2006–07	4	3ª	2nd	Round of 32
2007–08	3	2ª B	20th	
2008–09	4	3ª	2nd	
2009–10	4	3ª	2nd	
2010–11	3	2ª B	18th	
2011–12	4	3ª	1st	
2012–13	3	2ª B	15th	First round
2013–14	3	2ª B	19th	
2014–15	4	3ª	1st	
2015–16	3	2ª B	20th	Second round
2016–17	4	3ª	1st	
2017–18	3	2ª B	17th	First round
2018–19	4	3ª	2nd	
2019–20	4	3ª	6th	First round
2020–21	4	3ª	1st / 1st	
2021–22	4	2ª RFEF	18th	
2022–23	5	3ª Fed.	4th	
2023–24	5	3ª Fed.	4th	

Season	Tier	Division	Place	Copa del Rey
2024–25	5	3ª Fed.	5th	
2025–26	5	3ª Fed.	1st	
2026–27	4	2ª Fed.		TBD

- 10 seasons in Segunda División B
- 2 seasons in Segunda Federación/Segunda División RFEF
- 38 seasons in Tercera División
- 3 seasons in Tercera Federación

== Current squad ==
As of 16 November 2017

Note: Flags indicate national team as defined under FIFA eligibility rules; some limited exceptions apply. Players may hold more than one non-FIFA nationality.

No.	Pos.	Nation	Player
—	GK	ESP	Íñigo Calvo
—	GK	ESP	Eduardo de Prados
—	DF	ESP	Iván García
—	DF	ESP	Xiker
—	DF	ESP	Iñigo de Frutos
—	DF	ESP	Imanol Garnica
—	DF	ESP	Jonathan Serrano
—	DF	ESP	Álex Heredia
—	DF	ESP	Endika Galarza
—	DF	ESP	Eneko Iriondo
—	MF	ESP	Xabi Calvo

No.	Pos.	Nation	Player
—	MF	ESP	Diego Lacruz
—	MF	ESP	Mario Ganuza
—	MF	ESP	Héctor Urdiroz
—	MF	ESP	Jon Ceberio
—	MF	ESP	Javier Alonso
—	MF	ESP	Oier Sarriegi
—	MF	CPV	Valdo
—	FW	ESP	Miguel Maeztu
—	FW	ESP	Fermín Úriz
—	FW	ESP	Adrián Socorro

== Famous players ==
- (Spain) Raúl Iturralde
