= Moscardó (surname) =

Moscardó, Moscardo is a Spanish surname. Notable people with the surname include:

- Jerônimo Moscardo (born 1940), Brazilian diplomat
- José Moscardó Ituarte (1878–1956), Spanish general
- Pasqual Sanchis Moscardó (born 1963), Spanish Valencian pilotari
- Vicente Moscardó (born 1987), Spanish footballer
