= 2019–20 Tercera División =

Spanish 4th tier association football season

Tercera División
- Season: 2019–20

The 2019–20 Tercera División is the fourth tier of Spanish football. It began in August 2019 and was supposed to end in late June 2020 with the promotion play-off finals. On 11 March 2020, the season was suspended due to the COVID-19 pandemic in Spain.

On 6 May 2020, the Royal Spanish Football Federation announced the premature end of the leagues, revoking all relegations and planning an eventual promotion playoff to be played if possible. Each regional federation would be allowed to plan their own group for the 2020–21 season.

== Competition format ==
- The top four eligible teams in each group will play the promotion playoffs.
- The champion of each group will qualify to 2020–21 Copa del Rey. If the champion is a reserve team, the first non-reserve team qualified will join the Copa.
- In each group, at least three teams will be relegated to Regional Divisions.

== Group 1 – Galicia ==
=== Teams ===
Location of teams of the 2019–20 Tercera División Group 1
Teams in Ourense: Ourense CF, UD Ourense
Teams in A Coruña: Deportivo Fabril, Silva

| Team | City | Home ground |
|---|---|---|
| Alondras | Cangas | O Morrazo |
| Arenteiro | O Carballiño | Espiñedo |
| Arosa | Vilagarcía de Arousa | A Lomba |
| Arzúa | Arzúa | Do Viso |
| As Pontes | As Pontes de García Rodríguez | O Poboado |
| Barco | O Barco de Valdeorras | Calabagueiros |
| Bergantiños | Carballo | As Eiroas |
| Choco | Redondela | Santa Mariña |
| Compostela | Santiago de Compostela | Vero Boquete |
| Deportivo Fabril | Abegondo | Abegondo |
| Estradense | A Estrada | Municipal |
| Ourense CF | Ourense | O Couto |
| Paiosaco | A Laracha | Porta Santa |
| Polvorín | Lugo | O Polvorín |
| Pontellas | Pontellas, O Porriño | San Campio |
| Racing Villalbés | Vilalba | A Magdalena |
| Rápido de Bouzas | Vigo | Baltasar Pujales |
| Silva | A Coruña | A Grela |
| Somozas | As Somozas | Pardiñas |
| UD Ourense | Ourense | O Couto |

=== League table ===
| Pos | Team | Pld | W | D | L | GF | GA | GD | Pts | Qualification or relegation |
|---|---|---|---|---|---|---|---|---|---|---|
| 1 | Compostela (O, P) | 27 | 19 | 4 | 4 | 50 | 15 | +35 | 61 | Qualification to promotion playoffs and Copa del Rey |
| 2 | Ourense CF | 27 | 18 | 6 | 3 | 50 | 21 | +29 | 60 | Qualification to promotion playoffs and Copa del Rey |
| 3 | Arosa | 27 | 12 | 11 | 4 | 42 | 31 | +11 | 47 | Qualification to promotion playoffs |
| 4 | Barco | 27 | 15 | 2 | 10 | 40 | 40 | 0 | 47 | Qualification to promotion playoffs |
| 5 | Choco | 27 | 12 | 7 | 8 | 40 | 28 | +12 | 43 | |
| 6 | Arzúa | 27 | 13 | 2 | 12 | 40 | 39 | +1 | 41 | |
| 7 | Deportivo Fabril | 27 | 11 | 7 | 9 | 38 | 28 | +10 | 40 | |
| 8 | UD Ourense | 27 | 10 | 10 | 7 | 32 | 36 | −4 | 40 | |
| 9 | Arenteiro | 27 | 7 | 14 | 6 | 29 | 31 | −2 | 35 | |
| 10 | Estradense | 27 | 10 | 5 | 12 | 33 | 32 | +1 | 35 | |
| 11 | Polvorín | 27 | 10 | 5 | 12 | 51 | 33 | +18 | 35 | |
| 12 | Silva | 27 | 9 | 8 | 10 | 24 | 25 | −1 | 35 | |
| 13 | Bergantiños | 27 | 9 | 7 | 11 | 27 | 31 | −4 | 34 | |
| 14 | Racing Villalbés | 27 | 9 | 7 | 11 | 30 | 30 | 0 | 34 | |
| 15 | Somozas | 27 | 8 | 8 | 11 | 31 | 43 | −12 | 32 | |
| 16 | Alondras | 27 | 8 | 8 | 11 | 32 | 45 | −13 | 32 | |
| 17 | As Pontes | 27 | 7 | 7 | 13 | 39 | 44 | −5 | 28 | |
| 18 | Rápido de Bouzas | 27 | 6 | 5 | 16 | 36 | 54 | −18 | 23 | |
| 19 | Pontellas | 27 | 4 | 8 | 15 | 22 | 56 | −34 | 20 | |
| 20 | Paiosaco | 27 | 2 | 11 | 14 | 23 | 47 | −24 | 17 | |

Source: RFEF
Rules for classification: 1) points; 2) head-to-head points; 3) head-to-head goal difference; 4) goal difference; 5) number of goals scored; 6) fair-play points; 7) playoff match
(O) Play-off winners; (P) Promoted

== Group 2 – Asturias ==
=== Teams ===
Location of the 2019–20 Tercera División Group 2
Teams in Gijón: Ceares, Gijón Industrial
Teams in Oviedo: Covadonga, Vallobín

| Team | City | Home ground |
|---|---|---|
| Avilés | Avilés | Román Suárez Puerta |
| Caudal | Mieres | Hermanos Antuña |
| Ceares | Gijón | La Cruz |
| Colunga | Colunga | Santianes |
| Condal | Noreña | Alejandro Ortea |
| Covadonga | Oviedo | Juan Antonio Álvarez Rabanal |
| Gijón Industrial | Gijón | Santa Cruz |
| L'Entregu | El Entrego, San Martín del Rey Aurelio | Nuevo Nalón |
| Lealtad | Villaviciosa | Les Caleyes |
| Lenense | Pola de Lena, Lena | El Sotón |
| Llanera | Llanera | Pepe Quimarán |
| Llanes | Llanes | San José |
| Mosconia | Grado | Marqués de la Vega de Anzo |
| Navarro | Valliniello, Avilés | Tabiella |
| Praviano | Pravia | Santa Catalina |
| San Martín | Sotrondio, San Martín del Rey Aurelio | El Florán |
| Siero | Pola de Siero, Siero | El Bayu |
| Tuilla | Tuilla, Langreo | El Candín |
| Urraca | Posada, Llanes | La Corredoria |
| Vallobín | Oviedo | Vallobín |

=== League table ===
| Pos | Team | Pld | W | D | L | GF | GA | GD | Pts | Qualification or relegation |
|---|---|---|---|---|---|---|---|---|---|---|
| 1 | Lealtad (P) | 28 | 17 | 11 | 0 | 44 | 12 | +32 | 62 | Qualification to promotion playoffs and Copa del Rey |
| 2 | Llanera | 28 | 18 | 5 | 5 | 48 | 26 | +22 | 59 | Qualification to promotion playoffs and Copa del Rey |
| 3 | Covadonga (O, P) | 28 | 16 | 9 | 3 | 65 | 33 | +32 | 57 | Qualification to promotion playoffs |
| 4 | Caudal | 28 | 16 | 8 | 4 | 54 | 21 | +33 | 56 | Qualification to promotion playoffs |
| 5 | Tuilla | 28 | 16 | 7 | 5 | 42 | 25 | +17 | 55 | |
| 6 | Llanes | 28 | 14 | 6 | 8 | 47 | 30 | +17 | 48 | |
| 7 | Urraca | 28 | 12 | 7 | 9 | 34 | 25 | +9 | 43 | |
| 8 | Gijón Industrial | 28 | 10 | 9 | 9 | 42 | 36 | +6 | 39 | |
| 9 | L'Entregu | 28 | 10 | 4 | 14 | 26 | 36 | −10 | 34 | |
| 10 | Condal | 28 | 7 | 11 | 10 | 29 | 37 | −8 | 32 | |
| 11 | Praviano | 28 | 8 | 8 | 12 | 37 | 42 | −5 | 32 | |
| 12 | Mosconia | 28 | 7 | 10 | 11 | 29 | 33 | −4 | 31 (Note: Mosconia is ahead of Navarro on overall goal difference) | |
| 13 | Navarro | 28 | 8 | 7 | 13 | 26 | 35 | −9 | 31 | |
| 14 | Lenense | 28 | 6 | 11 | 11 | 28 | 48 | −20 | 29 | |
| 15 | Ceares | 28 | 6 | 9 | 13 | 28 | 37 | −9 | 27 | |
| 16 | Avilés | 28 | 4 | 13 | 11 | 34 | 50 | −16 | 25 | |
| 17 | Vallobín | 28 | 5 | 10 | 13 | 19 | 32 | −13 | 25 | |
| 18 | San Martín | 28 | 4 | 12 | 12 | 26 | 49 | −23 | 24 | |
| 19 | Colunga | 28 | 5 | 8 | 15 | 25 | 53 | −28 | 23 | |
| 20 | Siero | 28 | 3 | 11 | 14 | 25 | 48 | −23 | 20 | |

Source: RFEF
Rules for classification: 1) points; 2) head-to-head points; 3) head-to-head goal difference; 4) goal difference; 5) number of goals scored; 6) fair-play points; 7) playoff match
(O) Play-off winners; (P) Promoted

== Group 3 – Cantabria ==
=== Teams ===
Location of teams of the 2019–20 Tercera División Group III
Teams in Santander: Rayo Cantabria, Atlético Albericia
Teams in Torrelavega: Barreda, Gimnástica, Tropezón

| Team | City | Home ground |
|---|---|---|
| Atlético Albericia | Santander | Juan Hormaechea |
| Barreda | Barreda, Torrelavega | Solvay |
| Barquereño | San Vicente de la Barquera | El Castañar |
| Bezana | Santa Cruz de Bezana | Municipal |
| Cartes | Cartes | El Ansar |
| Cayón | Sarón, Santa María de Cayón | Fernando Astobiza |
| Escobedo | Escobedo, Camargo | Eusebio Arce |
| Gimnástica Torrelavega | Torrelavega | El Malecón |
| Guarnizo | Guarnizo, El Astillero | El Pilar |
| Laredo | Laredo | San Lorenzo |
| Rayo Cantabria | Santander | La Albericia |
| Ribamontán al Mar | Ribamontán al Mar | Baceñuela |
| Sámano | Sámano, Castro Urdiales | Vallegón |
| Selaya | Selaya | El Castañal |
| Siete Villas | Castillo, Arnuero | San Pedro |
| Solares-Medio Cudeyo | Solares, Medio Cudeyo | La Estación |
| Textil Escudo | Cabezón de la Sal | Municipal |
| Torina | Bárcena de Pie de Concha | Municipal |
| Tropezón | Tanos, Torrelavega | Santa Ana |
| Vimenor | Vioño de Piélagos, Piélagos | La Vidriera |

=== League table ===
| Pos | Team | Pld | W | D | L | GF | GA | GD | Pts | Qualification or relegation |
|---|---|---|---|---|---|---|---|---|---|---|
| 1 | Laredo (O, P) | 28 | 20 | 5 | 3 | 60 | 24 | +36 | 65 | Qualification to promotion playoffs and Copa del Rey |
| 2 | Gimnástica Torrelavega | 28 | 18 | 6 | 4 | 58 | 23 | +35 | 60 | Qualification to promotion playoffs and Copa del Rey |
| 3 | Rayo Cantabria | 28 | 18 | 3 | 7 | 54 | 24 | +30 | 57 | Qualification to promotion playoffs |
| 4 | Tropezón | 28 | 16 | 6 | 6 | 55 | 32 | +23 | 54 | Qualification to promotion playoffs |
| 5 | Cayón | 28 | 14 | 9 | 5 | 54 | 23 | +31 | 51 | |
| 6 | Escobedo | 28 | 14 | 7 | 7 | 48 | 32 | +16 | 49 | |
| 7 | Bezana | 28 | 14 | 5 | 9 | 43 | 27 | +16 | 47 | |
| 8 | Barreda | 28 | 13 | 5 | 10 | 35 | 41 | −6 | 44 | |
| 9 | Barquereño | 28 | 9 | 9 | 10 | 35 | 37 | −2 | 36 | |
| 10 | Guarnizo | 28 | 11 | 2 | 15 | 40 | 45 | −5 | 35 | |
| 11 | Siete Villas | 28 | 8 | 10 | 10 | 32 | 31 | +1 | 34 (Note: Siete Villas is ahead of Torina on head-to-head points: Torina–Siete Villas 1–1, Siete Villas–Torina 2–1) | |
| 12 | Torina | 28 | 9 | 7 | 12 | 36 | 42 | −6 | 34 | |
| 13 | Sámano | 28 | 10 | 3 | 15 | 32 | 49 | −17 | 33 | |
| 14 | Selaya | 28 | 9 | 5 | 14 | 21 | 41 | −20 | 32 | |
| 15 | Textil Escudo | 28 | 8 | 3 | 17 | 31 | 49 | −18 | 27 | |
| 16 | Solares-Medio Cudeyo | 28 | 6 | 8 | 14 | 23 | 41 | −18 | 26 | |
| 17 | Ribamontán al Mar | 28 | 6 | 7 | 15 | 27 | 56 | −29 | 25 | |
| 18 | Vimenor | 28 | 6 | 7 | 15 | 30 | 51 | −21 | 25 | |
| 19 | Atlético Albericia | 28 | 6 | 7 | 15 | 33 | 50 | −17 | 25 | |
| 20 | Cartes | 28 | 5 | 6 | 17 | 23 | 52 | −29 | 21 | |

Source: RFEF
Rules for classification: 1) points; 2) head-to-head points; 3) head-to-head goal difference; 4) goal difference; 5) number of goals scored; 6) fair-play points; 7) playoff match
(O) Play-off winners; (P) Promoted

== Group 4 – Basque Country ==
=== Teams ===
Location of teams of the 2019–20 Tercera División Group IV
Teams in Sestao: San Pedro, Sestao River
Teams in Vitoria-Gasteiz: Ariznabarra, San Ignacio

| Team | City | Home ground |
|---|---|---|
| Ariznabarra | Vitoria-Gasteiz | Ariznabarra |
| Balmaseda | Balmaseda | La Baluga |
| Basconia | Basauri | López Cortázar |
| Beasain | Beasain | Loinaz |
| Cultural Durango | Durango | Tabira |
| Deusto | Bilbao | Etxezuri |
| Gernika | Gernika-Lumo | Urbieta |
| Lagun Onak | Azpeitia | Garmendipe |
| Pasaia | Pasaia | Don Bosco |
| Portugalete | Portugalete | La Florida |
| Real Sociedad C | San Sebastián | Zubieta |
| San Ignacio | Vitoria-Gasteiz | Adurtzabal |
| Santurtzi | Santurtzi | San Jorge |
| Santutxu | Bilbao | Maiona |
| Sestao River | Sestao | Las Llanas |
| Sodupe | Güeñes | Lorenzo Hurtado de Saratxo |
| Somorrostro | Muskiz | El Malecón |
| Tolosa | Tolosa | Berazubi |
| Urduliz | Urduliz | Iparralde |
| Vitoria | Laudio | Ellakuri |

=== League table ===
| Pos | Team | Pld | W | D | L | GF | GA | GD | Pts | Qualification or relegation |
|---|---|---|---|---|---|---|---|---|---|---|
| 1 | Portugalete (O, P) | 28 | 16 | 8 | 4 | 48 | 22 | +26 | 56 (Note: Portugalete is ahead of Sestao River on head-to-head points: Portugalete–Sestao River 4–1, Sestao River–Portugalete 2–2) | Qualification to promotion playoffs and Copa del Rey |
| 2 | Sestao River | 28 | 16 | 8 | 4 | 52 | 24 | +28 | 56 | Qualification to promotion playoffs and Copa del Rey |
| 3 | Vitoria | 28 | 16 | 7 | 5 | 35 | 14 | +21 | 55 | Qualification to promotion playoffs |
| 4 | Basconia | 28 | 13 | 8 | 7 | 38 | 26 | +12 | 47 | Qualification to promotion playoffs |
| 5 | Somorrostro | 28 | 13 | 7 | 8 | 38 | 27 | +11 | 46 | |
| 6 | Gernika | 28 | 13 | 6 | 9 | 42 | 26 | +16 | 45 | |
| 7 | San Ignacio | 28 | 9 | 12 | 7 | 38 | 29 | +9 | 39 | |
| 8 | Pasaia | 28 | 10 | 9 | 9 | 27 | 27 | 0 | 39 | |
| 9 | Santutxu | 28 | 9 | 12 | 7 | 26 | 26 | 0 | 39 | |
| 10 | Balmaseda | 28 | 9 | 10 | 9 | 29 | 28 | +1 | 37 | |
| 11 | Sodupe | 28 | 9 | 9 | 10 | 27 | 31 | −4 | 36 (Note: Sodupe is ahead of Santurtzi on head-to-head goal difference: Santurtzi–Sodupe 2–1, Sodupe–Santurtzi 3–0) | |
| 12 | Santurtzi | 28 | 8 | 12 | 8 | 21 | 27 | −6 | 36 | |
| 13 | Real Sociedad C | 28 | 8 | 10 | 10 | 33 | 39 | −6 | 34 | |
| 14 | Beasain | 28 | 7 | 12 | 9 | 31 | 31 | 0 | 33 | |
| 15 | Cultural Durango | 28 | 7 | 8 | 13 | 33 | 35 | −2 | 29 | |
| 16 | Urduliz | 28 | 7 | 7 | 14 | 20 | 26 | −6 | 28 | |
| 17 | Tolosa | 28 | 6 | 8 | 14 | 20 | 42 | −22 | 26 (Note: Tolosa is ahead of Deusto and Lagun Onak on head-to-head points: Tolosa 8 pts, Deusto 4 pts, Lagun Onak 3 pts) | |
| 18 | Deusto | 28 | 6 | 8 | 14 | 28 | 49 | −21 | 26 | |
| 19 | Lagun Onak | 28 | 4 | 14 | 10 | 19 | 32 | −13 | 26 | |
| 20 | Ariznabarra | 28 | 4 | 5 | 19 | 17 | 61 | −44 | 17 | |

Source: RFEF
Rules for classification: 1) points; 2) head-to-head points; 3) head-to-head goal difference; 4) goal difference; 5) number of goals scored; 6) fair-play points; 7) playoff match
(O) Play-off winners; (P) Promoted

== Group 5 – Catalonia ==
=== Teams ===
Location of teams of the 2019–20 Tercera División Group 5
Location of teams of the 2019–20 Tercera División Group 5 in the province of Barcelona

| Team | City | Home ground |
|---|---|---|
| Banyoles | Banyoles | Nou Municipal |
| Castelldefels | Castelldefels | El Canyar |
| Cerdanyola del Vallès | Cerdanyola del Vallès | La Bòbila-Pinetons |
| Europa | Barcelona | Nou Sardenya |
| Figueres | Figueres | Vilatenim |
| Granollers | Granollers | Carrer Girona |
| Horta | Barcelona | Feliu i Codina |
| Igualada | Igualada | Les Comes |
| L'Hospitalet | L'Hospitalet de Llobregat | Municipal |
| Manresa | Manresa | El Congost |
| Peralada | Peralada | Municipal |
| Pobla de Mafumet | La Pobla de Mafumet | Municipal |
| San Cristóbal | Terrassa | Ca n'Anglada |
| Sant Andreu | Barcelona | Narcís Sala |
| Santfeliuenc | Sant Feliu de Llobregat | Les Grases |
| Sants | Barcelona | La Magòria |
| Terrassa | Terrassa | Olímpic |
| Vilafranca | Vilafranca del Penedès | Municipal |
| Vilassar de Mar | Vilassar de Mar | Xevi Ramón |

=== League table ===
| Pos | Team | Pld | W | D | L | GF | GA | GD | Pts | Qualification or relegation |
|---|---|---|---|---|---|---|---|---|---|---|
| 1 | L'Hospitalet (O, P) | 27 | 18 | 5 | 4 | 59 | 28 | +31 | 59 | Qualification to promotion playoffs and Copa del Rey |
| 2 | Terrassa | 27 | 15 | 8 | 4 | 42 | 19 | +23 | 53 | Qualification to promotion playoffs and Copa del Rey |
| 3 | Europa | 27 | 14 | 8 | 5 | 59 | 31 | +28 | 50 | Qualification to promotion playoffs |
| 4 | Sant Andreu (Note: Pobla de Mafumet was awarded with a 3–0 win against Sant Andreu due to illegal alignment. Match originally ended 0–1.) | 27 | 14 | 8 | 5 | 45 | 28 | +17 | 50 | Qualification to promotion playoffs |
| 5 | Peralada | 27 | 13 | 7 | 7 | 38 | 26 | +12 | 46 | |
| 6 | Pobla de Mafumet | 27 | 13 | 6 | 8 | 37 | 26 | +11 | 45 | |
| 7 | Vilafranca | 27 | 13 | 5 | 9 | 38 | 27 | +11 | 44 | |
| 8 | Vilassar de Mar | 27 | 11 | 11 | 5 | 44 | 34 | +10 | 44 | |
| 9 | Granollers | 27 | 13 | 4 | 10 | 50 | 34 | +16 | 43 | |
| 10 | Manresa | 27 | 11 | 6 | 10 | 37 | 28 | +9 | 39 (Note: Horta is ahead of Manresa on head-to-head points: Horta–Manresa 2–1, Manresa–Horta 0–1) | |
| 11 | Castelldefels | 27 | 11 | 5 | 11 | 37 | 37 | 0 | 38 | |
| 12 | Horta | 27 | 10 | 6 | 11 | 39 | 48 | −9 | 36 | |
| 13 | Cerdanyola del Vallès | 27 | 8 | 11 | 8 | 37 | 38 | −1 | 35 | |
| 14 | Figueres | 27 | 8 | 7 | 12 | 43 | 48 | −5 | 31 | |
| 15 | San Cristóbal | 27 | 8 | 7 | 12 | 31 | 38 | −7 | 31 | |
| 16 | Santfeliuenc | 27 | 8 | 5 | 14 | 31 | 44 | −13 | 29 | |
| 17 | Banyoles | 27 | 7 | 7 | 13 | 22 | 35 | −13 | 28 | |
| 18 | Igualada | 27 | 7 | 4 | 16 | 28 | 46 | −18 | 25 | |
| 19 | Sants | 27 | 6 | 4 | 17 | 29 | 50 | −21 | 22 | |
| 20 | Reus (Note: Reus was expelled before the start of the season due to unpaid wages.) (D) | 0 | 0 | 0 | 0 | 0 | 0 | 0 | 0 | Disqualified from competition |

Source: RFEF
Rules for classification: 1) points; 2) head-to-head points; 3) head-to-head goal difference; 4) goal difference; 5) number of goals scored; 6) fair-play points; 7) playoff match
(D) Disqualified; (O) Play-off winners; (P) Promoted

== Group 6 – Valencian Community ==
=== Teams ===
Location of teams of the 2019–20 Tercera División Group 6

| Team | City | Home ground |
|---|---|---|
| Acero | Sagunto | El Fornàs |
| Alcoyano | Alcoy | El Collao |
| Alzira | Alzira | Luis Suñer Picó |
| Atlético Saguntino | Sagunto | Morvedre |
| Atzeneta | Atzeneta d'Albaida | El Regit |
| Benigànim | Benigànim | Municipal |
| Crevillente | Crevillent | Enrique Miralles |
| Elche Ilicitano | Elche | José Díaz Iborra |
| Eldense | Elda | Nuevo Pepico Amat |
| Hércules B | Alicante | Juan Antonio Samaranch |
| Intercity | Sant Joan d'Alacant | San Juan |
| Jove Español | San Vicente del Raspeig | Ciudad Deportiva |
| Novelda | Novelda | La Magdalena |
| Olímpic | Xàtiva | La Murta |
| Paterna | Paterna | Gerardo Salvador |
| Roda | Castelló de la Plana | Pamesa Cerámica |
| Silla | Silla | Vicente Morera |
| Vilamarxant | Vilamarxant | Hermanos Albiol |
| Villarreal C | Villarreal | Pamesa Cerámica |

=== League table ===
| Pos | Team | Pld | W | D | L | GF | GA | GD | Pts | Qualification or relegation |
|---|---|---|---|---|---|---|---|---|---|---|
| 1 | Alcoyano (P) | 28 | 19 | 8 | 1 | 55 | 14 | +41 | 65 | Qualification to promotion playoffs and Copa del Rey |
| 2 | Alzira | 28 | 15 | 9 | 4 | 36 | 21 | +15 | 54 | Qualification to promotion playoffs |
| 3 | Atzeneta (O, P) | 28 | 15 | 5 | 8 | 40 | 22 | +18 | 50 | Qualification to promotion playoffs |
| 4 | Villarreal C (Note: Villarreal C is ineligible for playoffs as Villarreal B is in Segunda División B without any options to gain promotion to Segunda División.) | 28 | 13 | 9 | 6 | 46 | 29 | +17 | 48 (Note: Villarreal C is ahead of Intercity on head-to-head goal difference: Intercity–Villarreal C 2–1, Villarreal C–Intercity 2–0) | |
| 5 | Intercity | 28 | 13 | 9 | 6 | 49 | 33 | +16 | 48 | Qualification to promotion playoffs |
| 6 | Eldense | 28 | 11 | 7 | 10 | 36 | 27 | +9 | 40 | |
| 7 | Atlético Saguntino | 28 | 10 | 10 | 8 | 35 | 28 | +7 | 40 | |
| 8 | Recambios Colón | 28 | 11 | 7 | 10 | 34 | 32 | +2 | 40 | |
| 9 | Novelda | 28 | 10 | 9 | 9 | 35 | 33 | +2 | 39 | |
| 10 | Olímpic | 28 | 10 | 9 | 9 | 30 | 29 | +1 | 39 | |
| 11 | Jove Español | 28 | 10 | 8 | 10 | 37 | 34 | +3 | 38 | |
| 12 | Roda | 28 | 10 | 8 | 10 | 32 | 41 | −9 | 38 | |
| 13 | Crevillente | 28 | 8 | 10 | 10 | 25 | 36 | −11 | 34 | |
| 14 | Hércules B | 28 | 8 | 8 | 12 | 27 | 28 | −1 | 32 | |
| 15 | Elche Ilicitano | 28 | 7 | 9 | 12 | 26 | 32 | −6 | 30 | |
| 16 | Paterna | 28 | 6 | 11 | 11 | 26 | 37 | −11 | 29 | |
| 17 | Vilamarxant | 28 | 8 | 5 | 15 | 37 | 54 | −17 | 29 | |
| 18 | Acero | 28 | 6 | 8 | 14 | 24 | 35 | −11 | 26 | |
| 19 | Silla | 28 | 5 | 10 | 13 | 20 | 39 | −19 | 25 | |
| 20 | Benigànim | 28 | 5 | 1 | 22 | 20 | 66 | −46 | 16 | |

Source: RFEF
Rules for classification: 1) points; 2) head-to-head points; 3) head-to-head goal difference; 4) goal difference; 5) number of goals scored; 6) fair-play points; 7) playoff match
(O) Play-off winners; (P) Promoted

== Group 7 – Community of Madrid ==
=== Teams ===
Location of teams of the 2019–20 Tercera División Group 7
Teams in Alcorcón: Alcorcón B, Trival Valderas

| Team | City | Home ground |
|---|---|---|
| Alcalá | Alcalá de Henares | Municipal del Val |
| Alcobendas Sport | Alcobendas | Luis Aragonés |
| Alcorcón B | Alcorcón | Anexo de Santo Domingo |
| Atlético Pinto | Pinto | Amelia del Castillo |
| Carabanchel | Madrid | La Mina |
| El Álamo | El Álamo | Facundo Rivas |
| Flat Earth | Madrid | Castroserna |
| Leganés B | Leganés | Anexo de Butarque |
| Moratalaz | Madrid | La Dehesa |
| Móstoles URJC | Móstoles | La Dehesa |
| Navalcarnero | Navalcarnero | Mariano González |
| Parla | Parla | Los Prados |
| Pozuelo de Alarcón | Pozuelo de Alarcón | Valle de las Cañas |
| Rayo Vallecano B | Madrid | Ciudad Deportiva |
| San Fernando de Henares | San Fernando de Henares | Santiago del Pino |
| Santa Ana | Madrid | Santa Ana |
| Torrejón | Torrejón de Ardoz | Las Veredillas |
| Trival Valderas | Alcorcón | La Canaleja |
| Unión Adarve | Madrid | Garcia de La Mata |
| Villaverde San Andrés | Madrid | Boetticher |

=== League table ===
| Pos | Team | Pld | W | D | L | GF | GA | GD | Pts | Qualification or relegation |
|---|---|---|---|---|---|---|---|---|---|---|
| 1 | Navalcarnero (O, P) | 28 | 16 | 5 | 7 | 44 | 22 | +22 | 53 | Qualification to promotion playoffs and Copa del Rey |
| 2 | Unión Adarve | 28 | 14 | 5 | 9 | 43 | 35 | +8 | 47 (Note: Unión Adarve is ahead of Alcorcón B on head-to-head points: Unión Adarve–Alcorcón B 3–1, Alcorcón B–Unión Adarve 1–1) | Qualification to promotion playoffs and Copa RFFM |
| 3 | Alcorcón B | 28 | 12 | 11 | 5 | 40 | 26 | +14 | 47 | Qualification to promotion playoffs and Copa RFFM |
| 4 | Alcalá | 28 | 13 | 6 | 9 | 41 | 32 | +9 | 45 | Qualification to promotion playoffs and Copa RFFM |
| 5 | Trival Valderas | 28 | 12 | 7 | 9 | 30 | 27 | +3 | 43 | Qualification to Copa RFFM |
| 6 | Leganés B | 28 | 11 | 9 | 8 | 49 | 41 | +8 | 42 | Qualification to Copa RFFM |
| 7 | Móstoles URJC | 28 | 12 | 6 | 10 | 42 | 36 | +6 | 42 | Qualification to Copa RFFM |
| 8 | Pozuelo de Alarcón | 28 | 11 | 7 | 10 | 36 | 38 | −2 | 40 | Qualification to Copa RFFM |
| 9 | Rayo Vallecano B | 28 | 10 | 9 | 9 | 47 | 44 | +3 | 39 | Qualification to Copa RFFM |
| 10 | Flat Earth (Note: Flat Earth docked 3 points for failing to show up to their Round 16 match against Rayo Vallecano B.) | 28 | 11 | 9 | 8 | 36 | 34 | +2 | 39 | |
| 11 | Santa Ana | 28 | 11 | 5 | 12 | 42 | 46 | −4 | 38 | |
| 12 | Carabanchel | 28 | 9 | 9 | 10 | 32 | 32 | 0 | 36 | |
| 13 | Atlético Pinto | 28 | 8 | 11 | 9 | 40 | 38 | +2 | 35 | |
| 14 | Torrejón | 28 | 9 | 8 | 11 | 27 | 32 | −5 | 35 | |
| 15 | El Álamo | 28 | 9 | 7 | 12 | 36 | 42 | −6 | 34 | |
| 16 | Moratalaz | 28 | 8 | 10 | 10 | 29 | 37 | −8 | 34 | |
| 17 | San Fernando de Henares | 28 | 8 | 9 | 11 | 38 | 42 | −4 | 33 (Note: San Fernando de Henares is ahead of Alcobendas Sport on head-to-head points: Alcobendas Sport–San Fernando de Henares 0–0, San Fernando de Henares–Alcobendas Sport 2–1) | |
| 18 | Alcobendas Sport | 28 | 8 | 9 | 11 | 35 | 38 | −3 | 33 | |
| 19 | Parla | 28 | 4 | 10 | 14 | 30 | 50 | −20 | 22 | |
| 20 | Villaverde San Andrés | 28 | 3 | 10 | 15 | 16 | 41 | −25 | 19 | |

Source: RFEF
Rules for classification: 1) points; 2) head-to-head points; 3) head-to-head goal difference; 4) goal difference; 5) number of goals scored; 6) fair-play points; 7) playoff match
(O) Play-off winners; (P) Promoted

== Group 8 – Castile and León ==
=== Teams ===
Location of teams of the 2019–20 Tercera División Group 8
Teams in Burgos: Bupolsa, Burgos Promesas, Real Burgos

| Team | City | Home ground |
|---|---|---|
| Almazán | Almazán | La Arboleda |
| Arandina | Aranda de Duero | El Montecillo |
| Atlético Astorga | Astorga | La Eragudina |
| Atlético Bembibre | Bembibre | La Devesa |
| Atlético Tordesillas | Tordesillas | Las Salinas |
| Ávila | Ávila | Adolfo Suárez |
| Becerril | Becerril de Campos | Mariano Haro |
| Bupolsa | Burgos | San Amaro |
| Burgos Promesas | Burgos | Castañares |
| Cristo Atlético | Palencia | Nueva Balastera |
| Gimnástica Segoviana | Segovia | La Albuera |
| Júpiter Leonés | León | Puente Castro |
| La Bañeza | La Bañeza | La Llanera |
| La Granja | San Ildefonso | El Hospital |
| La Virgen del Camino | La Virgen del Camino | Los Dominicos |
| Mirandés B | Miranda de Ebro | Ence |
| Numancia B | Soria | Francisco Rubio |
| Real Burgos (Note: Included after a judicial statement.) | Burgos | San Amaro |
| Salamanca UDS B | Salamanca | Pistas del Helmántico |
| Santa Marta | Santa Marta de Tormes | Alfonso San Casto |
| Zamora | Zamora | Ruta de la Plata |

=== League table ===
| Pos | Team | Pld | W | D | L | GF | GA | Pts | Coeff | Qualification or relegation |
|---|---|---|---|---|---|---|---|---|---|---|
| 1 | Zamora (O, P) | 28 | 23 | 4 | 1 | 63 | 15 | 73 | 2.6071 | Qualification to promotion playoffs and Copa del Rey |
| 2 | Gimnástica Segoviana | 29 | 23 | 1 | 5 | 57 | 20 | 70 | 2.4138 | Qualification to promotion playoffs and Copa del Rey |
| 3 | Arandina | 28 | 18 | 5 | 5 | 44 | 17 | 59 | 2.1071 | Qualification to promotion playoffs |
| 4 | Numancia B | 28 | 17 | 6 | 5 | 51 | 18 | 57 | 2.0357 | Qualification to promotion playoffs |
| 5 | Burgos Promesas | 29 | 16 | 7 | 6 | 45 | 21 | 55 | 1.8966 | |
| 6 | Cristo Atlético | 28 | 15 | 6 | 7 | 40 | 18 | 51 | 1.8214 | |
| 7 | Atlético Astorga | 28 | 15 | 5 | 8 | 46 | 26 | 50 | 1.7857 | |
| 8 | Ávila | 28 | 13 | 5 | 10 | 35 | 28 | 44 | 1.5714 | |
| 9 | Salamanca UDS B | 29 | 12 | 6 | 11 | 37 | 39 | 42 | 1.4483 | |
| 10 | Almazán | 29 | 10 | 8 | 11 | 36 | 40 | 38 | 1.3103 | |
| 11 | Real Burgos | 29 | 10 | 6 | 13 | 36 | 39 | 36 | 1.2414 | |
| 12 | Júpiter Leonés | 29 | 10 | 5 | 14 | 40 | 50 | 35 | 1.2069 | |
| 13 | Bupolsa | 29 | 10 | 4 | 15 | 26 | 33 | 34 | 1.1724 | |
| 14 | Becerril | 28 | 9 | 5 | 14 | 30 | 46 | 32 | 1.1429 | |
| 15 | Santa Marta | 29 | 8 | 8 | 13 | 24 | 32 | 32 | 1.1034 | |
| 16 | La Virgen del Camino | 29 | 9 | 3 | 17 | 33 | 54 | 30 | 1.0345 | |
| 17 | Atlético Tordesillas | 28 | 5 | 10 | 13 | 27 | 40 | 25 | 0.8929 | |
| 18 | La Bañeza | 29 | 5 | 6 | 18 | 20 | 56 | 21 | 0.7241 | |
| 19 | Mirandés B | 29 | 3 | 11 | 15 | 24 | 54 | 20 | 0.6897 | |
| 20 | Atlético Bembibre | 28 | 4 | 7 | 17 | 17 | 40 | 19 | 0.6786 | |
| 21 | La Granja | 29 | 4 | 4 | 21 | 25 | 70 | 16 | 0.5517 | |

Source: RFEF
Rules for classification: 1) coefficient; 2) head-to-head points; 3) head-to-head goal difference; 4) goal difference; 5) number of goals scored; 6) fair-play points; 7) playoff match
(O) Play-off winner; (P) Promoted

== Group 9 – Eastern Andalusia and Melilla ==
=== Teams ===
Location of teams of the 2019–20 Tercera División Group 9
Teams in Almería: Almería B, Polideportivo Almería
Teams in Málaga: Atlético Malagueño, El Palo

| Team | City | Home ground |
|---|---|---|
| Alhaurín de la Torre | Alhaurín de la Torre | Los Manantiales |
| Almería B | Almería | Estadio de los Juegos Mediterráneos |
| Antequera | Antequera | El Maulí |
| Atlético Malagueño | Málaga | El Viso |
| Atlético Mancha Real | Mancha Real | La Juventud |
| Atlético Porcuna | Porcuna | San Benito |
| Ciudad de Torredonjimeno | Torredonjimeno | Matías Prats |
| El Ejido | El Ejido | Santo Domingo |
| El Palo | Málaga | San Ignacio |
| Huétor Tájar | Huétor-Tájar | Miguel Moranto |
| Huétor Vega | Huétor Vega | Las Viñas |
| Jaén | Jaén | La Victoria |
| Linares | Linares | Linarejos |
| Loja | Loja | Medina Lauxa |
| Maracena | Maracena | Ciudad Deportiva |
| Melilla CD | Melilla | La Espiguera |
| Motril | Motril | Escribano Castilla |
| Polideportivo Almería | Almería | Juventud Emilio Campra |
| Torreperogil | Torreperogil | Abdón Martínez Fariñas |
| Vélez | Vélez-Málaga | Vivar Téllez |

=== League table ===
| Pos | Team | Pld | W | D | L | GF | GA | GD | Pts | Qualification or relegation |
|---|---|---|---|---|---|---|---|---|---|---|
| 1 | Linares (P) | 29 | 24 | 3 | 2 | 60 | 16 | +44 | 75 | Qualification to promotion playoffs and Copa del Rey |
| 2 | El Ejido (O, P) | 29 | 17 | 6 | 6 | 48 | 28 | +20 | 57 | Qualification to promotion playoffs and Copa del Rey |
| 3 | Motril | 29 | 16 | 8 | 5 | 50 | 24 | +26 | 56 (Note: Motril is ahead of Jaén on head-to-head points: Motril–Jaén 2–1, Jaén–Motril 0–0) | Qualification to promotion playoffs and Copa RFAF |
| 4 | Jaén | 29 | 17 | 5 | 7 | 54 | 25 | +29 | 56 | Qualification to promotion playoffs and Copa RFAF |
| 5 | Almería B | 29 | 15 | 8 | 6 | 60 | 28 | +32 | 53 | |
| 6 | Ciudad de Torredonjimeno | 29 | 14 | 8 | 7 | 53 | 33 | +20 | 50 | Qualification to Copa RFAF |
| 7 | Antequera | 29 | 14 | 7 | 8 | 42 | 32 | +10 | 49 | Qualification to Copa RFAF |
| 8 | El Palo | 29 | 13 | 9 | 7 | 44 | 37 | +7 | 48 | |
| 9 | Atlético Malagueño | 29 | 11 | 6 | 12 | 41 | 37 | +4 | 39 | |
| 10 | Loja | 29 | 9 | 10 | 10 | 49 | 55 | −6 | 37 | |
| 11 | Atlético Mancha Real | 29 | 7 | 14 | 8 | 25 | 29 | −4 | 35 | |
| 12 | Huétor Tájar | 29 | 9 | 8 | 12 | 42 | 48 | −6 | 35 | |
| 13 | Torreperogil | 29 | 8 | 10 | 11 | 30 | 35 | −5 | 34 | |
| 14 | Maracena | 29 | 6 | 12 | 11 | 33 | 41 | −8 | 30 | |
| 15 | Polideportivo Almería | 29 | 6 | 11 | 12 | 35 | 49 | −14 | 29 | |
| 16 | Vélez | 29 | 8 | 4 | 17 | 37 | 56 | −19 | 28 | |
| 17 | Huétor Vega | 29 | 7 | 6 | 16 | 33 | 48 | −15 | 27 | |
| 18 | Melilla CD | 29 | 5 | 8 | 16 | 21 | 64 | −43 | 23 | |
| 19 | Atlético Porcuna | 29 | 5 | 5 | 19 | 21 | 48 | −27 | 20 | |
| 20 | Alhaurín de la Torre | 29 | 3 | 4 | 22 | 29 | 74 | −45 | 13 | |

Source: RFEF
Rules for classification: 1) points; 2) head-to-head points; 3) head-to-head goal difference; 4) goal difference; 5) number of goals scored; 6) fair-play points; 7) playoff match
(O) Play-off winners; (P) Promoted

== Group 10 – Western Andalusia and Ceuta ==
=== Teams ===
Location of teams of the 2019–20 Tercera División Group 10
Teams in Seville: Betis Deportivo, Sevilla C
Teams in Jerez de la Frontera: Xerez, Xerez Deportivo
Teams in Lebrija: Atlético Antoniano, Lebriajana

| Team | City | Home ground |
|---|---|---|
| Arcos | Arcos de la Frontera | Antonio Barbadillo |
| Atlético Antoniano | Lebrija | Municipal |
| Betis Deportivo | Seville | Luis del Sol |
| Ceuta | Ceuta | Alfonso Murube |
| Ciudad de Lucena | Lucena | Ciudad de Lucena |
| Conil | Conil de la Frontera | José Antonio Pérez Ureba |
| Córdoba B | Córdoba | Rafael Gómez |
| Coria | Coria del Río | Guadalquivir |
| Gerena | Gerena | José Juan Romero Gil |
| Lebrijana | Lebrija | Municipal |
| Los Barrios | Los Barrios | San Rafael |
| Pozoblanco | Pozoblanco | Municipal |
| Rota | Rota | Alcalde Navarro Flores |
| San Fermín | Puente Genil | Manuel Polinario |
| San Roque de Lepe | Lepe | Ciudad de Lepe |
| Sevilla C | Seville | José Ramón Cisneros Palacios |
| Utrera | Utrera | San Juan Bosco |
| Xerez | Jerez de la Frontera | La Juventud |
| Xerez Deportivo | Jerez de la Frontera | Chapín |

=== League table ===
| Pos | Team | Pld | W | D | L | GF | GA | GD | Pts | Qualification or relegation |
|---|---|---|---|---|---|---|---|---|---|---|
| 1 | Betis Deportivo (O, P) | 29 | 18 | 5 | 6 | 68 | 28 | +40 | 59 | Qualification to promotion playoffs |
| 2 | Ciudad de Lucena | 29 | 16 | 7 | 6 | 46 | 24 | +22 | 55 | Qualification to promotion playoffs and Copa del Rey |
| 3 | Xerez Deportivo | 29 | 17 | 4 | 8 | 44 | 24 | +20 | 55 | Qualification to promotion playoffs and Copa RFAF |
| 4 | Utrera | 29 | 15 | 7 | 7 | 41 | 22 | +19 | 52 | Qualification to promotion playoffs and Copa RFAF |
| 5 | Ceuta (Note: Ceuta lost one match administratively after fielding an ineligible player in their Round 1 match against Puente Genil. The match originally finished 4–3) | 29 | 14 | 9 | 6 | 50 | 22 | +28 | 51 | |
| 6 | Sevilla C | 29 | 14 | 9 | 6 | 34 | 19 | +15 | 51 | |
| 7 | Atlético Antoniano | 29 | 14 | 9 | 6 | 42 | 28 | +14 | 51 | Qualification to Copa RFAF |
| 8 | Puente Genil | 29 | 14 | 8 | 7 | 48 | 35 | +13 | 50 | Qualification to Copa RFAF |
| 9 | Rota | 28 | 11 | 7 | 10 | 47 | 49 | −2 | 40 | |
| 10 | Coria | 30 | 12 | 9 | 9 | 39 | 36 | +3 | 45 | |
| 11 | San Roque de Lepe | 29 | 11 | 7 | 11 | 39 | 31 | +8 | 40 | |
| 12 | Conil | 29 | 10 | 10 | 9 | 34 | 37 | −3 | 40 | |
| 13 | Lebrijana | 29 | 8 | 10 | 11 | 33 | 42 | −9 | 34 | |
| 14 | Gerena | 29 | 9 | 6 | 14 | 31 | 37 | −6 | 33 | |
| 15 | Arcos | 29 | 8 | 7 | 14 | 30 | 40 | −10 | 31 | |
| 16 | Los Barrios | 29 | 5 | 15 | 9 | 25 | 35 | −10 | 30 | |
| 17 | Xerez (Note: Xerez docked 3 points for forfeiting their Round 1 match against Arcos.) | 29 | 9 | 5 | 15 | 31 | 43 | −12 | 29 | |
| 18 | Pozoblanco | 29 | 7 | 5 | 17 | 32 | 51 | −19 | 26 | |
| 19 | Córdoba B | 29 | 6 | 5 | 18 | 30 | 54 | −24 | 23 | |
| 20 | Écija (Note: Écija was expelled after the end of the first week of the season due to unpaid wages. The team was subsequently liquidated.) (D) | 0 | 0 | 0 | 0 | 0 | 0 | 0 | 0 | Disqualified from competition |

Source: RFEF
Rules for classification: 1) points; 2) head-to-head points; 3) head-to-head goal difference; 4) goal difference; 5) number of goals scored; 6) fair-play points; 7) playoff match
(D) Disqualified; (O) Play-off winners; (P) Promoted

== Group 11 – Balearic Islands ==
=== Teams ===
Location of teams of the 2019–20 Tercera División Group 11
Teams in Palma: Collerense, Mallorca B, Santa Catalina Atlético

| Team | City | Home ground |
|---|---|---|
| Alcúdia | Alcúdia | Els Arcs |
| Andratx | Andratx | Sa Plana |
| Binissalem | Binissalem | Miquel Pons |
| Collerense | Es Coll d'en Rabassa, Palma | Ca Na Paulina |
| Constància | Inca | Municipal |
| Esporles | Esporles | Municipal Son Quint |
| Felanitx | Felanitx | Es Torrentó |
| Ferriolense | Son Ferriol, Palma | Municipal |
| Formentera | Sant Francesc Xavier | Municipal |
| Ibiza Islas Pitiusas | Ibiza | Can Misses |
| Llosetense | Lloseta | Municipal |
| Mallorca B | Palma | Son Bibiloni |
| Manacor | Manacor | Na Capellera |
| Platges de Calvià | Magaluf | Municipal de Magaluf |
| Poblense | Sa Pobla | Nou Camp |
| Portmany | Sant Antoni de Portmany | Sant Antoni |
| Sant Rafel | Sant Rafel | Municipal |
| Santa Catalina Atlético | Palma | Son Flor |
| Santanyí | Santanyí | Municipal |
| Sóller | Sóller | En Maiol |

=== League table ===
| Pos | Team | Pld | W | D | L | GF | GA | Pts | Coeff | Qualification or relegation |
|---|---|---|---|---|---|---|---|---|---|---|
| 1 | Poblense (O, P) | 26 | 22 | 4 | 0 | 65 | 19 | 70 | 2.692 | Qualification to promotion playoffs and Copa del Rey |
| 2 | Ibiza Islas Pitiusas | 27 | 18 | 8 | 1 | 56 | 15 | 62 | 2.296 | Qualification to promotion playoffs and Copa del Rey |
| 3 | Mallorca B | 27 | 18 | 6 | 3 | 61 | 18 | 60 | 2.222 | Qualification to promotion playoffs |
| 4 | Felanitx | 27 | 15 | 7 | 5 | 46 | 25 | 52 | 1.925 (Note: Felanitx is ahead of Platges de Calvià on overall goal difference (Felanitx +21, Platges de Calvià +13), as they did not play both matches between them) | Qualification to promotion playoffs |
| 5 | Platges de Calvià | 27 | 15 | 7 | 5 | 35 | 22 | 52 | 1.925 | |
| 6 | Andratx | 27 | 16 | 2 | 9 | 59 | 37 | 50 | 1.851 | |
| 7 | Formentera | 27 | 15 | 4 | 8 | 53 | 39 | 49 | 1.814 | |
| 8 | Constància | 27 | 12 | 5 | 10 | 23 | 24 | 41 | 1.518 | |
| 9 | Sant Rafel | 27 | 10 | 10 | 7 | 47 | 33 | 40 | 1.481 | |
| 10 | Ferriolense | 27 | 9 | 6 | 12 | 32 | 44 | 33 | 1.222 | |
| 11 | Binissalem | 26 | 8 | 7 | 11 | 32 | 35 | 31 | 1.192 | |
| 12 | Sóller | 27 | 9 | 5 | 13 | 37 | 46 | 32 | 1.185 | |
| 13 | Santanyí | 27 | 7 | 8 | 12 | 33 | 44 | 29 | 1.074 | |
| 14 | Llosetense | 27 | 7 | 8 | 12 | 34 | 47 | 29 | 1.074 | |
| 15 | Manacor | 27 | 7 | 5 | 15 | 26 | 41 | 26 | 0.962 | |
| 16 | Alcúdia | 27 | 5 | 10 | 12 | 34 | 52 | 25 | 0.925 | |
| 17 | Portmany | 27 | 4 | 5 | 18 | 22 | 56 | 17 | 0.629 | |
| 18 | Santa Catalina Atlético (Note: Santa Catalina Atlético lost one match administratively after fielding an ineligible player in their Round 2 match against Ferriolense. The match originally finished in a 2–2 draw.) | 27 | 4 | 4 | 19 | 20 | 52 | 16 | 0.592 | |
| 19 | Collerense | 27 | 4 | 4 | 19 | 21 | 60 | 16 | 0.592 | |
| 20 | Esporles | 27 | 1 | 11 | 15 | 30 | 57 | 14 | 0.518 | |

Source: RFEF
Rules for classification: 1) coefficient; 2) head-to-head points; 3) head-to-head goal difference; 4) goal difference; 5) number of goals scored; 6) fair-play points; 7) playoff match
(O) Play-off winner; (P) Promoted

== Group 12 – Canary Islands ==
=== Teams ===
Location of teams of the 2019–20 Tercera División Group 12
Teams in Las Palmas: Las Palmas C, Tamaraceite, Unión Viera
Teams in Santa Cruz de La Palma: Mensajero, Tenisca

| Team | City | Home ground |
|---|---|---|
| Atlético Paso | El Paso | Municipal |
| Atlético Tacoronte | Tacoronte | Barranco las Lajas |
| Atlético Unión de Güímar | Güímar | Tasagaya |
| Buzanada | Buzanada, Arona | Clementina de Bello |
| Gran Tarajal | Tuineje | Municipal |
| Ibarra | Las Galletas, Arona | Villa Isabel |
| La Cuadra-Unión Puerto | Puerto del Rosario | Municipal de Los Pozos |
| Lanzarote | Arrecife | Ciudad Deportiva |
| Las Palmas C | Las Palmas | Anexo Gran Canaria |
| Marino | Los Cristianos, Arona | Antonio Domínguez |
| Mensajero | Santa Cruz de La Palma | Silvestre Carrillo |
| Panadería Pulido | Vega de San Mateo | San Mateo |
| San Fernando | San Bartolomé de Tirajana | Ciudad Deportiva |
| Santa Úrsula | Santa Úrsula | Argelio Tabares |
| Tamaraceite | Las Palmas | Juan Guedes |
| Tenerife B | Santa Cruz de Tenerife | Centro Insular |
| Tenisca | Santa Cruz de La Palma | Virgen de las Nieves |
| Unión Viera | Las Palmas | Alfonso Silva |
| Vera | Puerto de la Cruz | Salvador Ledesma |
| Villa de Santa Brígida | Santa Brígida | El Guiniguada |

=== League table ===
| Pos | Team | Pld | W | D | L | GF | GA | Pts | Coeff | Qualification or relegation |
|---|---|---|---|---|---|---|---|---|---|---|
| 1 | Marino (P) | 27 | 16 | 5 | 6 | 41 | 30 | 53 | 1.962 | Qualification to promotion playoffs and Copa del Rey |
| 2 | Tenisca | 28 | 16 | 6 | 6 | 57 | 36 | 54 | 1.928 | Qualification to promotion playoffs |
| 3 | San Fernando | 27 | 16 | 4 | 7 | 58 | 29 | 52 | 1.925 | Qualification to promotion playoffs |
| 4 | Tamaraceite (O, P) | 28 | 15 | 8 | 5 | 49 | 31 | 53 | 1.892 | Qualification to promotion playoffs |
| 5 | Atlético Paso | 27 | 13 | 10 | 4 | 54 | 31 | 49 | 1.814 | |
| 6 | Tenerife B | 27 | 13 | 6 | 8 | 41 | 32 | 45 | 1.666 | |
| 7 | Vera | 28 | 12 | 7 | 9 | 54 | 52 | 43 | 1.535 | |
| 8 | Panadería Pulido | 28 | 13 | 2 | 13 | 52 | 39 | 41 | 1.464 | |
| 9 | Gran Tarajal | 28 | 10 | 11 | 7 | 52 | 44 | 41 | 1.464 | |
| 10 | Unión Viera | 28 | 11 | 6 | 11 | 32 | 42 | 39 | 1.392 | |
| 11 | La Cuadra-Unión Puerto | 27 | 9 | 8 | 10 | 32 | 37 | 35 | 1.296 | |
| 12 | Mensajero | 27 | 9 | 7 | 11 | 51 | 51 | 34 | 1.259 | |
| 13 | Santa Úrsula | 28 | 8 | 10 | 10 | 32 | 39 | 34 | 1.214 | |
| 14 | Lanzarote | 27 | 5 | 16 | 6 | 33 | 32 | 31 | 1.148 | |
| 15 | Las Palmas C | 28 | 8 | 8 | 12 | 33 | 31 | 32 | 1.142 | |
| 16 | Atlético Tacoronte | 27 | 8 | 6 | 13 | 34 | 47 | 30 | 1.111 | |
| 17 | Atlético Unión de Güímar | 28 | 6 | 7 | 15 | 34 | 53 | 25 | 0.892 | |
| 18 | Ibarra (Note: Ibarra lost one match administratively after fielding an ineligible player in their Round 1 match against Las Palmas C. The match was originally won by Ibarra 0–1) | 28 | 7 | 4 | 17 | 24 | 48 | 25 | 0.892 | |
| 19 | Buzanada | 27 | 5 | 6 | 16 | 23 | 55 | 21 | 0.777 | |
| 20 | Villa de Santa Brígida | 27 | 3 | 7 | 17 | 27 | 54 | 16 | 0.592 | |

Source: RFEF
Rules for classification: 1) points; 2) head-to-head points; 3) head-to-head goal difference; 4) goal difference; 5) number of goals scored; 6) fair-play points; 7) playoff match
(O) Play-off winner; (P) Promoted

== Group 13 – Region of Murcia ==
=== Teams ===
Location of teams of the 2019–20 Tercera División Group 13
Teams in Cartagena: Cartagena B, Cartagena FC
Teams in Murcia: Ciudad de Murcia, Los Garres, Murcia Imperial
Teams in Lorca: Lorca Deportiva, Lorca FC

| Team | City | Home ground |
|---|---|---|
| Águilas | Águilas | El Rubial |
| Atlético Pulpileño | Pulpí | San Miguel |
| Cartagena B | Cartagena | Cartagonova |
| Cartagena FC | Cartagena | Gómez Meseguer |
| Churra | Churra, Murcia | Municipal |
| Ciudad de Murcia | Murcia | José Barnés |
| Deportiva Minera | Llano del Beal, Cartagena | Ángel Cedrán |
| El Palmar | El Palmar, Murcia | Municipal |
| Huércal-Overa | Huércal-Overa | El Hornillo |
| Lorca Deportiva | Lorca | Francisco Artés Carrasco |
| Lorca FC | Lorca | Francisco Artés Carrasco |
| Los Garres | Murcia | Las Tejeras |
| Mar Menor | San Javier | Pitín |
| Mazarrón | Mazarrón | Municipal |
| Minerva | Alumbres, Cartagena | El Secante |
| Muleño | Mula | Municipal |
| Murcia Imperial | Murcia | Campus Universitario |
| Olímpico | Totana | Juan Cayuela |
| Plus Ultra | Llano de Brujas, Murcia | Municipal |
| UCAM Murcia B | Sangonera la Verde | El Mayayo |

=== League table ===
| Pos | Team | Pld | W | D | L | GF | GA | GD | Pts | Qualification or relegation |
|---|---|---|---|---|---|---|---|---|---|---|
| 1 | Lorca Deportiva (O, P) | 28 | 18 | 6 | 4 | 63 | 23 | +40 | 60 | Qualification to promotion playoffs and Copa del Rey |
| 2 | Atlético Pulpileño | 28 | 17 | 6 | 5 | 52 | 19 | +33 | 57 | Qualification to promotion playoffs and Copa del Rey |
| 3 | Mar Menor | 28 | 16 | 8 | 4 | 52 | 19 | +33 | 56 | Qualification to promotion playoffs |
| 4 | Murcia Imperial (Note: Murcia Imperial is ineligible for playoffs as Murcia is in Segunda División B without any options to gain promotion to Segunda División.) | 28 | 16 | 6 | 6 | 51 | 28 | +23 | 54 (Note: Murcia Imperial is ahead of Mazarrón on overall goal difference) | |
| 5 | Mazarrón | 28 | 16 | 6 | 6 | 44 | 32 | +12 | 54 | Qualification to promotion playoffs |
| 6 | UCAM Murcia B | 28 | 13 | 8 | 7 | 45 | 30 | +15 | 47 | |
| 7 | Lorca FC | 28 | 12 | 10 | 6 | 37 | 28 | +9 | 46 | |
| 8 | Minerva | 28 | 10 | 12 | 6 | 46 | 38 | +8 | 42 | |
| 9 | Muleño | 28 | 11 | 7 | 10 | 39 | 39 | 0 | 40 | |
| 10 | Los Garres | 28 | 9 | 8 | 11 | 34 | 30 | +4 | 35 | |
| 11 | Cartagena B | 28 | 7 | 12 | 9 | 35 | 36 | −1 | 33 | |
| 12 | Deportivo Minera | 28 | 8 | 9 | 11 | 39 | 47 | −8 | 33 | |
| 13 | Churra | 28 | 8 | 9 | 11 | 31 | 42 | −11 | 33 | |
| 14 | El Palmar | 28 | 9 | 4 | 15 | 26 | 51 | −25 | 31 | |
| 15 | Huércal-Overa | 28 | 7 | 9 | 12 | 29 | 34 | −5 | 30 | |
| 16 | Águilas | 28 | 6 | 9 | 13 | 30 | 38 | −8 | 27 | |
| 17 | Cartagena FC (Note: Cartagena FC lost one match administratively after fielding an ineligible plater in their Round 1 match against Murcia Imperial. The match originally ended in a 1–1 draw) | 28 | 6 | 8 | 14 | 28 | 49 | −21 | 26 | |
| 18 | Olímpico | 28 | 6 | 6 | 16 | 25 | 49 | −24 | 24 | |
| 19 | Ciudad de Murcia | 28 | 4 | 7 | 17 | 21 | 51 | −30 | 19 | |
| 20 | Plus Ultra | 28 | 3 | 6 | 19 | 18 | 62 | −44 | 15 | |

Source: RFEF
Rules for classification: 1) points; 2) head-to-head points; 3) head-to-head goal difference; 4) goal difference; 5) number of goals scored; 6) fair-play points; 7) playoff match
(O) Play-off winners; (P) Promoted

== Group 14 – Extremadura ==
=== Teams ===
Location of teams of the 2019–20 Tercera División Group 14
Teams in Cáceres: Cacereño, Diocesano

| Team | City | Home ground |
|---|---|---|
| Aceuchal | Aceuchal | Municipal |
| Arroyo | Arroyo de la Luz | Municipal |
| Azuaga | Azuaga | Municipal |
| Cacereño | Cáceres | Príncipe Felipe |
| Calamonte | Calamonte | Municipal |
| Coria | Coria | La Isla |
| Diocesano | Cáceres | Campos de la Federación |
| Extremadura B | Almendralejo | Tomás de la Hera |
| Fuente de Cantos | Fuente de Cantos | Francisco de Zurbarán |
| Jerez | Jerez de los Caballeros | Manuel Calzado Galván |
| Llerenense | Llerena | Fernando Robina |
| Miajadas | Miajadas | Municipal |
| Montijo | Montijo | Municipal |
| Moralo | Navalmoral de la Mata | Municipal |
| Olivenza | Olivenza | Municipal |
| Plasencia | Plasencia | Ciudad Deportiva |
| Racing Valverdeño | Valverde de Leganés | San Roque |
| Trujillo | Trujillo | Julián García de Guadiana |
| Valdivia | Valdivia, Villanueva de la Serena | Primero de Mayo |
| Villanovense | Villanueva de la Serena | Villanovense |

=== League table ===
| Pos | Team | Pld | W | D | L | GF | GA | Pts | Coeff | Qualification or relegation |
|---|---|---|---|---|---|---|---|---|---|---|
| 1 | Villanovense (O, P) | 28 | 21 | 3 | 4 | 56 | 19 | 66 | 2.357 | Qualification to promotion playoffs and Copa del Rey |
| 2 | Coria | 28 | 21 | 2 | 5 | 54 | 23 | 65 | 2.321 | Qualification to promotion playoffs and Copa del Rey |
| 3 | Cacereño | 27 | 19 | 5 | 3 | 63 | 20 | 62 | 2.296 | Qualification to promotion playoffs |
| 4 | Extremadura B | 28 | 15 | 7 | 6 | 42 | 27 | 52 | 1.857 (Note: Extremadura B is ahead of Moralo on head-to-head points: Moralo–Extremadura B 1–1, Extremadura B–Moralo 3–2) | Qualification to promotion playoffs |
| 5 | Moralo | 28 | 15 | 7 | 6 | 53 | 32 | 52 | 1.857 | |
| 6 | Jerez | 28 | 13 | 5 | 10 | 35 | 26 | 44 | 1.571 | |
| 7 | Trujillo | 28 | 13 | 4 | 11 | 39 | 41 | 43 | 1.535 | |
| 8 | Aceuchal | 27 | 12 | 5 | 10 | 41 | 37 | 41 | 1.518 | |
| 9 | Arroyo | 28 | 13 | 3 | 12 | 33 | 33 | 42 | 1.500 | |
| 10 | Diocesano | 28 | 11 | 7 | 10 | 48 | 34 | 40 | 1.428 | |
| 11 | Azuaga | 28 | 11 | 6 | 11 | 36 | 35 | 39 | 1.392 | |
| 12 | Olivenza | 28 | 11 | 4 | 13 | 39 | 52 | 37 | 1.321 | |
| 13 | Plasencia | 28 | 10 | 5 | 13 | 29 | 38 | 35 | 1.250 | |
| 14 | Calamonte | 28 | 9 | 7 | 12 | 36 | 44 | 34 | 1.214 | |
| 15 | Montijo | 28 | 9 | 4 | 15 | 34 | 40 | 31 | 1.107 | |
| 16 | Miajadas | 28 | 9 | 3 | 16 | 27 | 46 | 30 | 1.071 | |
| 17 | Fuente de Cantos | 28 | 8 | 5 | 15 | 29 | 47 | 29 | 1.035 | |
| 18 | Llerenense | 28 | 5 | 8 | 15 | 22 | 38 | 23 | 0.821 | |
| 19 | Racing Valverdeño | 28 | 3 | 6 | 19 | 19 | 56 | 15 | 0.535 | |
| 20 | Valdivia | 28 | 1 | 4 | 23 | 18 | 65 | 7 | 0.250 | |

Source: RFEF
Rules for classification: 1) points; 2) head-to-head points; 3) head-to-head goal difference; 4) goal difference; 5) number of goals scored; 6) fair-play points; 7) playoff match
(O) Play-off winner; (P) Promoted

== Group 15 – Navarre ==
=== Teams ===
Location of teams of the 2019–20 Tercera División Group 15
Teams in Pamplona: Txantrea, Pamplona, San Juan

| Team | City | Home ground |
|---|---|---|
| Ardoi | Zizur Mayor | El Pinar |
| Atlético Cirbonero | Cintruénigo | San Juan |
| Baztán | Baztán | Giltxaurdi |
| Beti Kozkor | Lekunberri | Plazaola |
| Beti Onak | Villava | Lorenzo Goikoa |
| Burladés | Burlada | Ripagaina |
| Corellano | Corella | José Luis de Arrese |
| Cortes | Cortes | San Francisco Javier |
| Fontellas | Fontellas | Nuevo Secarales |
| Huarte | Huarte/Uharte | Areta |
| Lourdes | Tudela | Luis Asarta |
| Murchante | Murchante | San Roque |
| Mutilvera | Aranguren | Valle Aranguren |
| Pamplona | Pamplona | Bidezarra |
| Peña Azagresa | Azagra | Miguel Sola |
| Peña Sport | Tafalla | San Francisco |
| San Juan | Pamplona | San Juan |
| Subiza | Subiza | Sotoburu |
| Txantrea | Pamplona | Txantrea |
| Valle de Egüés | Egüés | Sarriguren |

=== League table ===
| Pos | Team | Pld | W | D | L | GF | GA | GD | Pts | Qualification or relegation |
|---|---|---|---|---|---|---|---|---|---|---|
| 1 | Mutilvera (O, P) | 27 | 18 | 4 | 5 | 57 | 27 | +30 | 58 | Qualification to promotion playoffs and Copa del Rey |
| 2 | San Juan | 27 | 16 | 7 | 4 | 49 | 23 | +26 | 55 | Qualification to promotion playoffs |
| 3 | Beti Kozkor | 27 | 14 | 10 | 3 | 42 | 27 | +15 | 52 | Qualification to promotion playoffs |
| 4 | Pamplona | 27 | 14 | 8 | 5 | 36 | 18 | +18 | 50 | Qualification to promotion playoffs |
| 5 | Huarte | 27 | 12 | 11 | 4 | 40 | 26 | +14 | 47 | |
| 6 | Peña Sport | 27 | 12 | 9 | 6 | 44 | 35 | +9 | 45 | |
| 7 | Atlético Cirbonero | 27 | 12 | 8 | 7 | 52 | 38 | +14 | 44 | |
| 8 | Txantrea | 27 | 10 | 11 | 6 | 45 | 34 | +11 | 41 | |
| 9 | Burladés | 27 | 9 | 10 | 8 | 31 | 34 | −3 | 37 | |
| 10 | Valle de Egüés | 27 | 9 | 8 | 10 | 45 | 41 | +4 | 35 | |
| 11 | Beti Onak | 27 | 9 | 8 | 10 | 32 | 38 | −6 | 35 | |
| 12 | Cortes | 27 | 7 | 11 | 9 | 27 | 23 | +4 | 32 | |
| 13 | Corellano | 27 | 9 | 5 | 13 | 29 | 42 | −13 | 32 | |
| 14 | Murchante | 27 | 7 | 10 | 10 | 27 | 30 | −3 | 31 | |
| 15 | Lourdes | 27 | 8 | 6 | 13 | 28 | 37 | −9 | 30 (Note: Lourdes is ahead of Ardoi on head-to-head points: Lourdes–Ardoi 4–1, Ardoi–Lourdes 1–2) | |
| 16 | Ardoi | 27 | 9 | 3 | 15 | 29 | 39 | −10 | 30 | |
| 17 | Peña Azagresa | 27 | 6 | 7 | 14 | 39 | 53 | −14 | 25 | |
| 18 | Subiza | 27 | 6 | 6 | 15 | 34 | 49 | −15 | 24 | |
| 19 | Baztán | 27 | 5 | 4 | 18 | 30 | 57 | −27 | 19 | |
| 20 | Fontellas | 27 | 3 | 4 | 20 | 16 | 61 | −45 | 13 | |

Source: RFEF
Rules for classification: 1) points; 2) head-to-head points; 3) head-to-head goal difference; 4) goal difference; 5) number of goals scored; 6) fair-play points; 7) playoff match
(O) Play-off winners; (P) Promoted

== Group 16 – La Rioja ==
=== Teams ===
Location of teams of the 2019–20 Tercera División Group 16
Teams in Logroño: Berceo, Calasancio, Comillas, SD Logroñés, UD Logroñés Promesas, Varea, Villegas, Yagüe

| Team | City | Home ground |
|---|---|---|
| Alberite | Alberite | Mariano Sáenz Andollo |
| Alfaro | Alfaro | La Molineta |
| Anguiano | Anguiano | Isla |
| Arnedo | Arnedo | Sendero |
| Atlético Vianés | Viana | Municipal |
| Berceo | Logroño | La Isla |
| Calahorra B | Calahorra | La Planilla |
| Calasancio | Logroño | La Estrella |
| Casalarreina | Casalarreina | El Soto |
| La Calzada | Santo Domingo de La Calzada | El Rollo |
| Comillas | Logroño | Mundial 82 |
| Náxara | Nájera | La Salera |
| Oyonesa | Oyón | El Espinar |
| Pradejón | Pradejón | Municipal |
| River Ebro | Rincón de Soto | San Miguel |
| SD Logroñés | Logroño | Las Gaunas |
| UD Logroñés Promesas | Logroño | Mundial 82 |
| Varea | Varea, Logroño | Municipal |
| Villegas | Logroño | La Ribera |
| Yagüe | Logroño | El Salvador |

=== League table ===
| Pos | Team | Pld | W | D | L | GF | GA | GD | Pts | Qualification or relegation |
|---|---|---|---|---|---|---|---|---|---|---|
| 1 | SD Logroñés (O, P) | 28 | 22 | 4 | 2 | 68 | 12 | +56 | 70 (Note: SD Logroñés is ahead of Varea on head-to-head points: Varea–SD Logroñés 1–4, SD Logroñés–Varea 1–0) | Qualification to promotion playoffs and Copa del Rey |
| 2 | Varea | 28 | 23 | 1 | 4 | 83 | 22 | +61 | 70 | Qualification to promotion playoffs and Copa del Rey |
| 3 | Casalarreina | 28 | 19 | 4 | 5 | 59 | 26 | +33 | 61 | Qualification to promotion playoffs |
| 4 | Arnedo | 28 | 18 | 6 | 4 | 55 | 30 | +25 | 60 | Qualification to promotion playoffs |
| 5 | UD Logroñés B | 28 | 17 | 5 | 6 | 69 | 23 | +46 | 56 | |
| 6 | Anguiano | 28 | 17 | 4 | 7 | 64 | 35 | +29 | 55 | |
| 7 | Náxara | 28 | 16 | 4 | 8 | 71 | 37 | +34 | 52 | |
| 8 | Oyonesa | 28 | 13 | 7 | 8 | 51 | 36 | +15 | 46 | |
| 9 | Calahorra B | 28 | 14 | 4 | 10 | 49 | 38 | +11 | 46 | |
| 10 | Alfaro | 28 | 12 | 4 | 12 | 54 | 41 | +13 | 40 | |
| 11 | River Ebro | 28 | 8 | 9 | 11 | 42 | 47 | −5 | 33 | |
| 12 | Berceo | 28 | 9 | 6 | 13 | 50 | 61 | −11 | 33 | |
| 13 | Pradejón | 28 | 7 | 6 | 15 | 36 | 53 | −17 | 27 | |
| 14 | Atlético Vianés | 28 | 6 | 9 | 13 | 30 | 47 | −17 | 27 | |
| 15 | Alberite | 28 | 7 | 5 | 16 | 32 | 59 | −27 | 26 | |
| 16 | Comillas | 28 | 5 | 9 | 14 | 32 | 61 | −29 | 24 | |
| 17 | Calasancio | 28 | 6 | 4 | 18 | 20 | 65 | −45 | 22 | |
| 18 | La Calzada | 28 | 5 | 4 | 19 | 25 | 56 | −31 | 19 | |
| 19 | Yagüe | 28 | 4 | 4 | 20 | 20 | 73 | −53 | 16 | |
| 20 | Villegas | 28 | 2 | 1 | 25 | 13 | 101 | −88 | 7 | |

Source: RFEF
Rules for classification: 1) points; 2) head-to-head points; 3) head-to-head goal difference; 4) goal difference; 5) number of goals scored; 6) fair-play points; 7) playoff match
(O) Play-off winners; (P) Promoted

== Group 17 – Aragon ==
=== Teams ===
Location of teams of the 2019–20 Tercera División Group 17
Teams in Zaragoza: Deportivo Aragón, San Juan, Valdefierro

| Team | City | Home ground |
|---|---|---|
| Almudévar | Almudévar | La Corona |
| Atlético Monzón | Monzón | Isidro Calderón |
| Barbastro | Barbastro | Municipal de los Deportes |
| Belchite 97 | Belchite | Municipal |
| Binéfar | Binéfar | Los Olmos |
| Borja | Borja | Manuel Meler |
| Brea | Brea de Aragón | Piedrabuena |
| Calamocha | Calamocha | Jumaya |
| Cuarte | Cuarte de Huerva | Nuevo Municipal |
| Deportivo Aragón | Zaragoza | Ciudad Deportiva |
| Fraga | Fraga | La Estacada |
| Illueca | Illueca | Papa Luna |
| Robres | Robres | San Blas |
| San Juan | Zaragoza | |
| Sariñena | Sariñena | El Carmen |
| Tamarite | Tamarite de Litera | La Colomina |
| Tarazona | Tarazona | Municipal |
| Teruel | Teruel | Pinilla |
| Utebo | Utebo | Santa Ana |
| Valdefierro | Zaragoza | Valdefierro |
| Villanueva | Villanueva de Gállego | Nuevo Enrique Porta |

=== League table ===
| Pos | Team | Pld | W | D | L | GF | GA | Pts | Coeff | Qualification or relegation |
|---|---|---|---|---|---|---|---|---|---|---|
| 1 | Tarazona (O, P) | 28 | 20 | 5 | 3 | 58 | 20 | 65 | 2.321 | Qualification to promotion playoffs and Copa del Rey |
| 2 | Teruel | 29 | 18 | 9 | 2 | 53 | 19 | 63 | 2.172 | Qualification to promotion playoffs and Copa del Rey |
| 3 | Brea | 29 | 16 | 6 | 7 | 41 | 23 | 54 | 1.862 | Qualification to promotion playoffs |
| 4 | Deportivo Aragón | 28 | 14 | 9 | 5 | 51 | 23 | 51 | 1.821 | Qualification to promotion playoffs |
| 5 | Cuarte | 28 | 14 | 8 | 6 | 39 | 32 | 50 | 1.785 | |
| 6 | San Juan | 28 | 13 | 7 | 8 | 38 | 30 | 46 | 1.642 | |
| 7 | Borja | 28 | 12 | 9 | 7 | 37 | 29 | 45 | 1.607 | |
| 8 | Illueca | 28 | 10 | 13 | 5 | 42 | 37 | 43 | 1.535 | |
| 9 | Sariñena | 29 | 12 | 7 | 10 | 36 | 32 | 43 | 1.482 | |
| 10 | Binéfar | 29 | 10 | 11 | 8 | 34 | 30 | 41 | 1.413 | |
| 11 | Barbastro | 29 | 10 | 9 | 10 | 35 | 33 | 39 | 1.344 | |
| 12 | Fraga | 29 | 9 | 10 | 10 | 35 | 33 | 37 | 1.275 | |
| 13 | Utebo | 29 | 8 | 8 | 13 | 37 | 41 | 32 | 1.103 (Note: Utebo is ahead of Atlético Monzón on overall goal difference) | |
| 14 | Atlético Monzón | 29 | 8 | 8 | 13 | 24 | 34 | 32 | 1.103 | |
| 15 | Robres | 29 | 7 | 7 | 15 | 31 | 39 | 28 | 0.965 (Note: Robres is ahead of Tamarite on overall goal difference) | |
| 16 | Tamarite | 29 | 7 | 7 | 15 | 27 | 45 | 28 | 0.965 | |
| 17 | Calamocha | 28 | 7 | 6 | 15 | 32 | 48 | 27 | 0.964 | |
| 18 | Belchite 97 | 29 | 5 | 11 | 13 | 21 | 35 | 26 | 0.896 | |
| 19 | Villanueva | 29 | 5 | 9 | 15 | 23 | 48 | 24 | 0.827 | |
| 20 | Valdefierro | 28 | 6 | 4 | 18 | 22 | 56 | 22 | 0.785 | |
| 21 | Almudévar | 28 | 4 | 7 | 17 | 18 | 47 | 19 | 0.678 | |

Source: RFEF
Rules for classification: 1) points; 2) head-to-head points; 3) head-to-head goal difference; 4) goal difference; 5) number of goals scored; 6) fair-play points; 7) playoff match
(O) Play-off winner; (P) Promoted

== Group 18 – Castilla–La Mancha ==
=== Teams ===
Location of teams of the 2019–20 Tercera División Group 18

| Team | City | Home ground |
|---|---|---|
| Albacete B | Albacete | Andrés Iniesta |
| Almagro | Almagro | Manuel Trujillo |
| Almansa | Almansa | Paco Simón |
| Atlético Ibañés | Casas-Ibáñez | Municipal |
| Azuqueca | Azuqueca de Henares | San Miguel |
| Calvo Sotelo | Puertollano | Ciudad de Puertollano |
| Conquense | Cuenca | La Fuensanta |
| Guadalajara | Guadalajara | Pedro Escartín |
| Illescas | Illescas, Toledo | Municipal |
| La Roda | La Roda | Estadio Municipal |
| La Solana | La Solana | La Moheda |
| Madridejos | Madridejos | Nuevo Estadio |
| Manchego | Ciudad Real | Juan Carlos I |
| Pedroñeras | Las Pedroñeras | Municipal |
| Quintanar del Rey | Quintanar del Rey | San Marcos |
| Socuéllamos | Socuéllamos | Paquito Jiménez |
| Tarancón | Tarancón | Municipal |
| Toledo | Toledo | Salto del Caballo |
| Torrijos | Torrijos | San Francisco |
| Villacañas | Villacañas | Las Pirámides |

=== League table ===
| Pos | Team | Pld | W | D | L | GF | GA | Pts | Coeff | Qualification or relegation |
|---|---|---|---|---|---|---|---|---|---|---|
| 1 | Socuéllamos (O, P) | 28 | 17 | 10 | 1 | 50 | 15 | 61 | 2.178 | Qualification to promotion playoffs and Copa del Rey |
| 2 | Quintanar del Rey | 28 | 15 | 9 | 4 | 44 | 22 | 54 | 1.928 | Qualification to promotion playoffs and Copa del Rey |
| 3 | Guadalajara | 27 | 14 | 6 | 7 | 32 | 18 | 48 | 1.777 | Qualification to promotion playoffs |
| 4 | Toledo | 28 | 13 | 10 | 5 | 46 | 19 | 49 | 1.750 | Qualification to promotion playoffs |
| 5 | Atlético Ibañés | 27 | 12 | 11 | 4 | 40 | 22 | 47 | 1.740 | |
| 6 | Conquense | 27 | 13 | 7 | 7 | 40 | 30 | 46 | 1.703 | |
| 7 | Calvo Sotelo | 28 | 13 | 7 | 8 | 39 | 24 | 46 | 1.642 | |
| 8 | Tarancón | 28 | 12 | 6 | 10 | 39 | 33 | 42 | 1.500 | |
| 9 | Atlético Albacete | 28 | 11 | 7 | 10 | 46 | 39 | 40 | 1.428 | |
| 10 | La Solana | 28 | 10 | 9 | 9 | 26 | 25 | 39 | 1.392 | |
| 11 | Torrijos | 28 | 10 | 7 | 11 | 33 | 39 | 37 | 1.321 | |
| 12 | Azuqueca | 28 | 9 | 6 | 13 | 44 | 53 | 33 | 1.178 | |
| 13 | Manchego | 28 | 8 | 7 | 13 | 28 | 29 | 31 | 1.107 | |
| 14 | Villacañas | 28 | 8 | 7 | 13 | 26 | 36 | 31 | 1.107 | |
| 15 | La Roda | 28 | 6 | 11 | 11 | 26 | 36 | 29 | 1.035 | |
| 16 | Almagro | 28 | 7 | 6 | 15 | 24 | 47 | 27 | 0.964 (Note: Almagro is ahead of Illescas on head-to-head points: Almagro–Illescas 1–0, Illescas–Almagro 0–0) | |
| 17 | Illescas | 28 | 7 | 6 | 15 | 27 | 39 | 27 | 0.964 | |
| 18 | Pedroñeras | 28 | 6 | 8 | 14 | 20 | 44 | 26 | 0.928 | |
| 19 | Madridejos | 28 | 6 | 5 | 17 | 20 | 47 | 23 | 0.821 | |
| 20 | Almansa | 27 | 5 | 7 | 15 | 27 | 60 | 22 | 0.814 | |

Source: RFEF
Rules for classification: 1) points; 2) head-to-head points; 3) head-to-head goal difference; 4) goal difference; 5) number of goals scored; 6) fair-play points; 7) playoff match
(O) Play-off winner; (P) Promoted

== Copa del Rey qualification ==
32 teams qualified for the 2020–21 Copa del Rey: the best teams in each group (excluding reserves) and the 14 best second-placed teams ranked by their points coefficient. Should any second-placed team among these 14 qualify already as the best team in its group, a ranking of third-placed teams would fill the remaining vacants.

=== Ranking of second-placed teams ===
| Pos | Grp | Team | Pld | W | D | L | GF | GA | GD | Pts | Coeff | Qualification |
|---|---|---|---|---|---|---|---|---|---|---|---|---|
| 1 | 16 | Varea | 28 | 23 | 1 | 4 | 83 | 22 | +61 | 70 | 2.500 | Qualification to Copa del Rey |
| 2 | 8 | Gimnástica Segoviana | 29 | 23 | 1 | 5 | 57 | 20 | +37 | 70 | 2.414 | Qualification to Copa del Rey |
| 3 | 14 | Coria | 28 | 21 | 2 | 5 | 54 | 23 | +31 | 65 | 2.321 | Qualification to Copa del Rey |
| 4 | 11 | Ibiza Islas Pitiusas | 27 | 18 | 8 | 1 | 56 | 15 | +41 | 62 | 2.296 | Qualification to Copa del Rey |
| 5 | 1 | Ourense CF | 27 | 18 | 6 | 3 | 50 | 21 | +29 | 60 | 2.222 | Qualification to Copa del Rey |
| 6 | 17 | Teruel | 29 | 18 | 9 | 2 | 53 | 19 | +34 | 63 | 2.172 | Qualification to Copa del Rey |
| 7 | 3 | Gimnástica Torrelavega | 28 | 18 | 6 | 4 | 58 | 23 | +35 | 60 | 2.143 | Qualification to Copa del Rey |
| 8 | 2 | Llanera | 28 | 18 | 5 | 5 | 48 | 26 | +22 | 59 | 2.107 | Qualification to Copa del Rey |
| 9 | 15 | San Juan | 27 | 16 | 7 | 4 | 49 | 23 | +26 | 55 | 2.037 | Qualification to Copa del Rey |
| 10 | 13 | Atlético Pulpileño | 28 | 17 | 6 | 5 | 52 | 19 | +33 | 57 | 2.036 | Qualification to Copa del Rey |
| 11 | 4 | Sestao River | 28 | 16 | 8 | 4 | 52 | 24 | +28 | 56 | 2.000 | Qualification to Copa del Rey |
| 12 | 9 | El Ejido | 29 | 17 | 6 | 6 | 48 | 28 | +20 | 57 | 1.966 | Qualification to Copa del Rey |
| 13 | 5 | Terrassa | 27 | 15 | 8 | 4 | 42 | 19 | +23 | 53 | 1.963 | Qualification to Copa del Rey |
| 14 | 18 | Quintanar del Rey | 28 | 15 | 9 | 4 | 44 | 22 | +22 | 54 | 1.929 | Qualification to Copa del Rey |
| 15 | 12 | Tenisca | 28 | 16 | 6 | 6 | 57 | 36 | +21 | 54 | 1.929 | |
| 16 | 6 | Alzira | 28 | 15 | 9 | 4 | 36 | 21 | +15 | 54 | 1.929 | |
| 17 | 10 | Ciudad de Lucena (Note: Ciudad de Lucena qualified as the best-classified team in Group 10 after Betis Deportivo, ineligible being a reserve team) | 29 | 16 | 7 | 6 | 46 | 24 | +22 | 55 | 1.897 | Qualification to Copa del Rey |
| 18 | 7 | Unión Adarve | 28 | 14 | 5 | 9 | 43 | 35 | +8 | 47 | 1.679 | |

Source: RFEF – Tournament rules: Copa del Rey
Rules for classification: 1) coefficient; 2) goal difference; 3) number of goals scored; 4) fair-play points; 5) playoff match
