= Fontella =

Fontella may refer to:

- Fontella Bass (1940–2012), American soul singer
- Fontellas, municipality in Navarre, Spain
