= 2020 Tercera División play-offs =

Spanish football league play-offs

The 2020 Tercera División play-offs to Segunda División B from Tercera División (Promotion play-offs) were the final playoffs for the promotion from 2019–20 Tercera División to 2020–21 Segunda División B. The first four teams in each group took part in the play-off.

== Format ==
Due to the COVID-19 pandemic, the format was changed to an "express play-off" between the four first qualified teams of each group at the moment of the suspension, without meeting teams from other groups.

Playoffs were played, if possible, in a final four format at neutral venues and depending on the evolution of the pandemic in each region, with spectators or behind closed doors. In case of a draw in any game there were no penalty shootout or overtime; the best-positioned team in the regular season will qualify.

Only one team per group were promoted. The group champions that will not win promotion in the first stage will play an additional playoff to be determined for two more promotions. All teams could have refused to play one another if they wanted. However, there were no withdrawals.

Semifinals were played on 18 and 19 July, and most finals on 25 July.

== Qualified teams ==
Group 1		Group 2		Group 3		Group 4		Group 5		Group 6	
1	**Compostela**	1	**Lealtad**	1	**Laredo**	1	**Portugalete**	1	**L'Hospitalet**	1	**Alcoyano**
2	Ourense CF	2	Llanera	2	Gimnástica Torrelavega	2	Sestao River	2	Terrassa	2	Alzira
3	Arosa	3	**Covadonga**	3	Rayo Cantabria	3	Vitoria	3	Europa	3	**Atzeneta**
4	Barco	4	Caudal	4	Tropezón	4	Basconia	4	Sant Andreu	4	Intercity
Group 7		Group 8		Group 9		Group 10		Group 11		Group 12	
1	**Navalcarnero**	1	**Zamora**	1	**Linares**	1	**Betis Deportivo**	1	**Poblense**	1	**Marino**
2	Unión Adarve	2	Gimnástica Segoviana	2	**El Ejido**	2	Ciudad de Lucena	2	Ibiza Islas Pitiusas	2	Tenisca
3	Alcorcón B	3	Arandina	3	Motril	3	Xerez Deportivo	3	Mallorca B	3	UD San Fernando
4	Alcalá	4	Numancia B	4	Jaén	4	Utrera	4	Felanitx	4	**Tamaraceite**
Group 13		Group 14		Group 15		Group 16		Group 17		Group 18	
1	**Lorca Deportiva**	1	**Villanovense**	1	**Mutilvera**	1	**SD Logroñés**	1	**Tarazona**	1	**Socuéllamos**
2	Atlético Pulpileño	2	Coria	2	San Juan	2	Varea	2	Teruel	2	Quintanar del Rey
3	Mar Menor	3	Cacereño	3	Beti Kozkor	3	Casalarreina	3	Brea	3	Guadalajara
4	Mazarrón	4	Extremadura B	4	Pamplona	4	Arnedo	4	Deportivo Aragón	4	Toledo

- Teams in **bold** promoted to Segunda B
- Teams in italics are group leaders that promoted after the suspension of the repechage

== Group 1 – Galicia ==
Playoffs were played at Balaídos, Vigo.

Semi-finals
18 July
Compostela	3
Barco	1
19 July
Ourense CF	2
Arosa	1

Final
25 July
Compostela	1
Ourense CF	1

== Group 2 – Asturias ==
Playoffs were played at Román Suárez Puerta, Avilés.

Semi-finals
18 July
Lealtad	0
Caudal	1
19 July
Llanera	2
Covadonga	3

Final
25 July
Caudal	0
Covadonga	2

== Group 3 – Cantabria ==
Playoffs were played at Fernando Astorbiza, Sarón, Santa María de Cayón.

Semi-finals
18 July
Laredo	3
Tropezón	1
19 July
Gimnástica Torrelavega	1
Rayo Cantabria	1

Final
25 July
Laredo	2
Gimnástica Torrelavega	0

== Group 4 – Basque Country ==
Playoffs were played at Sarriena, Leioa. The final was postponed due to a COVID-19 positive case of a person related to a player of Portugalete.

Semi-finals
18 July
Portugalete	1
Basconia	0
19 July
Sestao River	0
Vitoria	0

Final
8 August
Portugalete	1
Sestao River	0

== Group 5 – Catalonia ==
Playoffs were played at Estadio Municipal, Badalona.

Semi-finals
18 July
L'Hospitalet	0
Sant Andreu	0
19 July
Terrassa	1
Europa	0

Final
25 July
L'Hospitalet	1
Terrassa	1

== Group 6 – Valencian Community ==
Playoffs were played at Estadio Luis Suñer Picó, Alzira; Estadio El Collao, Alcoy and Estadi Olímpic Camilo Cano, La Nucía.

Semi-finals
18 July – Alzira
Alcoyano	0
Intercity	0
19 July – Alcoy
Alzira	1
Atzeneta	3

Final
25 July – La Nucía
Alcoyano	0
Atzeneta	1

== Group 7 – Community of Madrid ==
Playoffs were played at Ciudad del Fútbol de Las Rozas, Madrid.

Semi-finals
18 July
Navalcarnero	1
Alcalá	1
19 July
Unión Adarve	1
Alcorcón B	3

Final
25 July
Navalcarnero	1
Alcorcón B	1

== Group 8 – Castile and León ==
Playoffs were played at Estadio Nueva Balastera, Palencia.

Semi-finals
18 July
Zamora	2
Numancia B	1
19 July
Gimnástica Segoviana	0
Arandina	0

Final
25 July
Zamora	2
Gimnástica Segoviana	1

== Group 9 – Eastern Andalusia and Melilla ==
Playoffs were played at Estadio Municipal, Marbella.

Semi-finals
18 July
Linares	0
Jaén	1
19 July
El Ejido	3
Motril	2

Final
25 July
Jaén	1
El Ejido	1

== Group 10 – Western Andalusia and Ceuta ==
Playoffs were played at Estadio Municipal, Marbella.

Semi-finals
18 July
Betis Deportivo	3
Utrera	1
19 July
Ciudad de Lucena	1
Xerez Deportivo	1

Final
25 July
Betis Deportivo	4
Ciudad de Lucena	1

== Group 11 – Balearic Islands ==
Playoffs were played at Estadi Municipal, Santanyí.

Semi-finals
18 July
Poblense	1
Felanitx	1
19 July
Ibiza Islas Pitiusas	0
Mallorca B	1

Final
25 July
Poblense	2
Mallorca B	1

== Group 12 – Canary Islands ==
Playoffs were played at Campo Municipal, La Frontera.

Semi-finals
18 July
Marino	0
Tamaraceite	1
19 July
Tenisca	0
UD San Fernando	4

Final
25 July
Tamaraceite	2
UD San Fernando	1

== Group 13 – Region of Murcia ==
Playoffs were played at Pinatar Arena, San Pedro del Pinatar.

Semi-finals
18 July
Lorca Deportiva	0
Mazarrón	0
19 July
Atlético Pulpileño	0
Mar Menor	0

Final
25 July
Lorca Deportiva	1
Atlético Pulpileño	1

== Group 14 – Extremadura ==
Semifinals were played at Estadio Romano, Mérida, while the final at Francisco de la Hera, Almendralejo.

Semi-finals
18 July
Villanovense	2
Extremadura B	0
19 July
Coria	0
Cacereño	1

Final
25 July
Villanovense	1
Cacereño	1

== Group 15 – Navarre ==
Playoffs were played at Merkatondoa, Estella-Lizarra.

Semi-finals
18 July
Mutilvera	0
Pamplona	0
19 July
San Juan	2
Beti Kozkor	4

Final
25 July
Mutilvera	1
Beti Kozkor	0

== Group 16 – La Rioja ==
Playoffs were played at Las Gaunas, Logroño.

Semi-finals
18 July
SD Logroñés	2
Arnedo	0
19 July
Varea	1
Casalarreina	0

Final
25 July
SD Logroñés	1
Varea	1

== Group 17 – Aragon ==
Playoffs were played at Estadio Pedro Sancho, Zaragoza.

Semi-finals
18 July
Tarazona	1
Deportivo Aragón	0
19 July
Teruel	1
Brea	2

Final
25 July
Tarazona	3
Brea	0

== Group 18 – Castilla–La Mancha ==
Playoffs were played at Manuel Delgado Meco, Alcázar de San Juan.

Semi-finals
18 July
Socuéllamos	1
Toledo	0
19 July
Quintanar del Rey	1
Guadalajara	2

Final
25 July
Socuéllamos	0
Guadalajara	0

== Repechage ==
Group champions that did not promote after their stages were eligible to play a new playoff for the two last spots. After the suspension of the Basque Country final, the RFEF agreed to close the competition to four teams, excluding Portugalete in case of losing the final. The two matches were drawn on 28 July.

The two matches would be played at La Ciudad del Fútbol, in Las Rozas de Madrid, at 22:00 CEST. However, the whole repechage was suspended just two hours before the match between Lealtad and Alcoyano due to several positive cases at Marino squad. On 10 August the RFEF granted the promotion of the four teams involved due to the limited availability of dates to play the matches.

Team 1	Score	Team 2
Lealtad	Cancelled	Alcoyano
Marino	Cancelled	Linares

== Promoted teams ==
Promoted to Segunda División B
Alcoyano (One year later)	Atzeneta (First time ever)	Betis Deportivo (2 years later)	Compostela (4 years later)	Covadonga (First time ever)	El Ejido (One year later)	L'Hospitalet (3 years later)	Laredo (30 years later)	Lealtad (2 years later)	Lorca Deportiva (2 years later)	Linares (3 years later)
Marino (7 years later)	Mutilvera (3 years later)	Navalcarnero (One year later)	Poblense (31 years later)	Portugalete (4 years later)	SD Logroñés (6 years later)	Socuéllamos (3 years later)	Tamaraceite (First time ever)	Tarazona (First time ever)	Villanovense (One year later)	Zamora (5 years later)

== See also ==
- 2020 Segunda División play-offs
- 2020 Segunda División B play-offs
