= SD Navarro CF =

Association football club in Spain

Coordinates: 43.570142°N 5.892844°W

Navarro
- Full name: Sociedad Deportiva Navarro Club de Fútbol
- Founded: 18 July 1980; 46 years ago
- Stadium: Estadio Tabiella
- Capacity: 2,000
- President: Juan Carlos García Bernardo
- Head coach: David Sánchez Rivas
- League: Primera Asturfútbol
- 2025–26: Tercera Federación – Group 2, 16th of 18 (relegated)
Home colours	Away colours

Former logo

Sociedad Deportiva Navarro Club de Fútbol is a football team based in Valliniello, Avilés in the autonomous community of Asturias. Founded in 1980, the team plays in Primera Asturfútbol. The club's home ground is Tabiella, which has a capacity of 2,000 spectators.

== Season to season ==
Season	Level	Division	Place	Copa del Rey
1980–81	7	2ª Reg.	9th	
1981–82	7	2ª Reg.	1st	
1982–83	7	2ª Reg.	2nd	
1983–84	6	1ª Reg.	6th	
1984–85	6	1ª Reg.	2nd	
1985–86	5	Reg. Pref.	19th	
1986–87	5	Reg. Pref.	17th	
1987–88	5	Reg. Pref.	18th	
1988–89	6	1ª Reg.	6th	
1989–90	6	1ª Reg.	17th	
1990–91	6	1ª Reg.	3rd	
1991–92	5	Reg. Pref.	4th	
1992–93	5	Reg. Pref.	1st	
1993–94	4	3ª	15th	
1994–95	4	3ª	16th	
1995–96	4	3ª	13th	
1996–97	4	3ª	9th	
1997–98	4	3ª	16th	
1998–99	4	3ª	8th	
1999–2000	4	3ª	12th	

Season	Level	Division	Place	Copa del Rey
2000–01	5	Reg. Pref.	4th	
2001–02	4	3ª	8th	
2002–03	4	3ª	18th	
2003–04	5	Reg. Pref.	1st	
2004–05	4	3ª	17th	
2005–06	4	3ª	12th	
2006–07	4	3ª	12th	
2007–08	4	3ª	13th	
2008–09	4	3ª	16th	
2009–10	4	3ª	11th	
2010–11	4	3ª	9th	
2011–12	4	3ª	15th	
2012–13	4	3ª	20th	
2013–14	5	Reg. Pref.	7th	
2014–15	5	Reg. Pref.	15th	
2015–16	5	Reg. Pref.	6th	
2016–17	5	Reg. Pref.	11th	
2017–18	5	Reg. Pref.	14th	
2018–19	5	Reg. Pref.	3rd	
2019–20	4	3ª	13th	

Season	Level	Division	Place	Copa del Rey
2020–21	4	3ª	8th / 3rd	
2021–22	5	3ª RFEF	18th	
2022–23	6	1ª RFFPA	10th	
2023–24	6	1ª Astur.	7th	
2024–25	6	1ª Astur.	4th	
2025–26	5	3ª Fed.	16th	
2026–27	6	1ª Astur.		

- 20 seasons in Tercera División
- 2 seasons in Tercera División RFEF/Tercera Federación

== Women's team ==
The women's team was created in 2018.

Season	Division	Place	Copa de la Reina
2018–19	Regional	10th	
2019–20	Regional	2nd	
