= Atzeneta UE =

Spanish football club

Atzeneta
- Full name: Atzeneta Unió Esportiva
- Founded: 1975; 51 years ago
- Ground: El Regit, Atzeneta d'Albaida, Valencian Community, Spain
- Capacity: 1,500
- President: José Pérez
- Head coach: Luis Miguel Garrido
- League: Tercera Federación – Group 6
- 2025–26: Tercera Federación – Group 6, 15th of 18
- Website: atzenetaue.com
| Home colours | Away colours |

Atzeneta Unió Esportiva is a Spanish football team based in Atzeneta d'Albaida, in the autonomous Valencian Community. Founded in 1975, it competes in Tercera Federación – Group 6, holding home matches at Campo de Futbol Municipal El Regit, with a seating capacity of 1,500.

== History ==
Founded in 1975, Atzeneta only played regional football until 2018, when it achieved promotion to Tercera División. The club reached the sixth position in their first campaign, and later appointed former international footballer David Albelda as their coach.

Under Albelda, the club reached their first-ever promotion to Segunda División B on 26 July 2020, after beating CD Alcoyano in the play-offs.

== Season to season ==
| Season | Tier | Division | Place | Copa del Rey |
|---|---|---|---|---|
| 1975–76 | 7 | 3ª Reg. | 13th | |
| 1976–77 | 7 | 3ª Reg. | | |
| 1977–78 | 7 | 2ª Reg. | 6th | |
| 1978–79 | 7 | 2ª Reg. | 6th | |
| 1979–80 | 7 | 2ª Reg. | 7th | |
| 1980–81 | 7 | 2ª Reg. | 4th | |
| 1981–82 | 7 | 2ª Reg. | 13th | |
| 1982–83 | 7 | 2ª Reg. | 3rd | |
| 1983–84 | 7 | 2ª Reg. | 13th | |
| 1984–85 | 7 | 2ª Reg. | (R) | |
| 1985–86 | DNP | | | |
| 1986–87 | DNP | | | |
| 1987–88 | DNP | | | |
| 1988–89 | 7 | 2ª Reg. | 10th | |
| 1989–90 | 7 | 2ª Reg. | 1st | |
| 1990–91 | 6 | 1ª Reg. | 9th | |
| 1991–92 | 6 | 1ª Reg. | 17th | |
| 1992–93 | 7 | 2ª Reg. | 1st | |
| 1993–94 | 6 | 1ª Reg. | 7th | |
| 1994–95 | 6 | 1ª Reg. | 7th | |

| Season | Tier | Division | Place | Copa del Rey |
|---|---|---|---|---|
| 1995–96 | 6 | 1ª Reg. | 4th | |
| 1996–97 | 6 | 1ª Reg. | 11th | |
| 1997–98 | 6 | 1ª Reg. | 6th | |
| 1998–99 | 6 | 1ª Reg. | 9th | |
| 1999–2000 | 6 | 1ª Reg. | 4th | |
| 2000–01 | 6 | 1ª Reg. | 3rd | |
| 2001–02 | 6 | 1ª Reg. | 6th | |
| 2002–03 | 6 | 1ª Reg. | 7th | |
| 2003–04 | 6 | 1ª Reg. | 9th | |
| 2004–05 | 6 | 1ª Reg. | 11th | |
| 2005–06 | 6 | 1ª Reg. | 16th | |
| 2006–07 | 7 | 2ª Reg. | 3rd | |
| 2007–08 | 7 | 2ª Reg. | 5th | |
| 2008–09 | 7 | 2ª Reg. | 7th | |
| 2009–10 | 7 | 2ª Reg. | 1st | |
| 2010–11 | 6 | 1ª Reg. | 9th | |
| 2011–12 | 6 | 1ª Reg. | 6th | |
| 2012–13 | 6 | 1ª Reg. | 5th | |
| 2013–14 | 6 | 1ª Reg. | 8th | |
| 2014–15 | 6 | 1ª Reg. | 2nd | |

| Season | Tier | Division | Place | Copa del Rey |
|---|---|---|---|---|
| 2015–16 | 5 | Reg. Pref. | 12th | |
| 2016–17 | 5 | Reg. Pref. | 1st | |
| 2017–18 | 5 | Reg. Pref. | 1st | |
| 2018–19 | 4 | 3ª | 6th | |
| 2019–20 | 4 | 3ª | 3rd | |
| 2020–21 | 3 | 2ª B | 7th / 5th | |
| 2021–22 | 5 | 3ª RFEF | 3rd | |
| 2022–23 | 5 | 3ª Fed. | 2nd | |
| 2023–24 | 5 | 3ª Fed. | 4th | Second round |
| 2024–25 | 5 | 3ª Fed. | 7th | |
| 2025–26 | 5 | 3ª Fed. | 15th | |
| 2026–27 | 5 | 3ª Fed. | | |

- 1 season in Segunda División B
- 2 seasons in Tercera División
- 6 seasons in Tercera Federación/Tercera División RFEF

== Current squad ==
As of 30 March 2021

Note: Flags indicate national team as defined under FIFA eligibility rules; some limited exceptions apply. Players may hold more than one non-FIFA nationality.

| No. | Pos. | Nation | Player |
|---|---|---|---|
| 2 | DF | ESP | Paco Sáez (captain) |
| 3 | DF | ESP | Kike Ferreres |
| 4 | DF | ESP | Enrique Sampedro |
| 6 | MF | ESP | Iosu Villar |
| 7 | FW | ESP | Javi Serra |
| 8 | MF | ESP | Vicente Moscardó |
| 9 | FW | ESP | Álex Chico |
| 10 | FW | ESP | Héctor Ayodele |
| 11 | FW | ESP | Javi García |
| 12 | MF | CMR | Ernesten Lavsamba |

| No. | Pos. | Nation | Player |
|---|---|---|---|
| 13 | GK | ESP | Joan Company |
| 14 | DF | ESP | Paco Aguza |
| 15 | DF | ESP | Carles Rosell (on loan from Levante B) |
| 16 | DF | ESP | José Manuel |
| 17 | MF | ESP | Lolo Ivars |
| 18 | MF | ESP | Jesús Rubio |
| 19 | FW | ESP | Guille Andrés |
| 20 | MF | ESP | Christian Albert (on loan from Levante B) |
| 21 | MF | ESP | Miguel Nemesio |
| - | DF | ESP | Nacho Porcar |
