= Jerônimo Moscardo =

Brazilian diplomat and politician (born 1940)

Jerônimo Moscardo de Souza (born 6 November 1940) is a retired Brazilian diplomat who served as Minister of Culture in 1993.

Born in Fortaleza, he is the son of Yolanda Gurgel de Souza and José Colombo de Souza. He studied law and became a Bachelor of Laws. From 1965 to 1967 he was personal secretary of Humberto Castelo Branco. From 1987 to 3 October 1991, he was Ambassador to San José, Costa Rica. From 3 October 1991 to 1 September 1993 he represented the government of Fernando Collor de Mello at Mercosur in Montevideo. From 1 September to 9 December 1993, he was Minister of Culture in the government of Itamar Franco. From 1995 to 3 November 2003 he was ambassador to Bucharest, Romania. He was Ambassador to Brussels from 3 November 2003 to 2 December 2005 and was appointed Ambassador to Luxembourg on 14 Sep 2005, based in Brussels.
