= Vicente Moscardó =

Spanish footballer

Personal information
- Full name: Vicente Moscardó Ferrando
- Date of birth: 5 April 1987 (age 39)
- Place of birth: Valencia, Spain
- Height: 1.76 m (5 ft 9 1/2 in)
- Position: Defensive midfielder

Youth career
- Valencia

Senior career*
Years	Team	Apps	(Gls)
2006–2007	Valencia B		
2007–2008	Puertollano	16	(0)
2008–2009	Las Palmas B	19	(0)
2009	Las Palmas	1	(0)
2009–2010	Alavés	5	(1)
2010	→ Toledo (loan)	13	(0)
2010–2011	Poli Ejido	35	(3)
2011–2012	San Roque	21	(2)
2012–2013	Real Unión	29	(0)
2013	Salamanca	0	(0)
2014–2015	Coruxo	43	(5)
2015	Huracán	14	(0)
2016	Mérida	11	(0)
2016–2019	Olímpic Xàtiva	73	(5)
2019–2021	Atzeneta	37	(1)
2021–2022	Olímpic Xàtiva	27	(0)
2022–2023	Acero	26	(1)
Total		370	(18)
- * Club domestic league appearances and goals

Vicente Moscardó Ferrando (born 5 April 1987 in Valencia) is a Spanish former professional footballer who played as a defensive midfielder.
