= AD San Juan =

Association football club in Spain

San Juan
- Full name: Agrupación Deportiva San Juan
- Founded: 1962
- Ground: San Juan, Pamplona, Navarre, Spain
- Capacity: 1,000
- Chairman: (Spain) Joseba Koldobica
- Manager: (Spain) Alfredo Ibero
- League: Tercera Federación – Group 15
- 2025–26: Tercera Federación – Group 15, 5th of 18
Home colours	Away colours

Agrupación Deportiva San Juan is a Spanish sports club team based in Pamplona in the autonomous community of Navarre. Founded in 1962, it plays in Tercera Federación – Group 15. Its stadium is Estadio San Juan with a capacity of 1,000 seaters. Sports sections includes football and futsal as well as other.

== Season to season ==
Season	Tier	Division	Place	Copa del Rey
1965–66	5	2ª Reg.	7th	
1966–67	5	2ª Reg.	1st	
1967–68	4	1ª Reg.	11th	
1968–69	4	1ª Reg.	7th	
1969–70	4	1ª Reg.	10th	
1970–71	4	1ª Reg.	4th	
1971–72	4	1ª Reg.	6th	
1972–73	4	1ª Reg.	8th	
1973–74	4	1ª Reg.	15th	
1974–75	5	1ª Reg.	4th	
1975–76	5	1ª Reg.	8th	
1976–77	5	1ª Reg.	5th	
1977–78	6	1ª Reg.	7th	
1978–79	6	1ª Reg.	6th	
1979–80	6	1ª Reg.	4th	
1980–81	6	1ª Reg.	3rd	
1981–82	6	1ª Reg.	3rd	
1982–83	6	1ª Reg.	3rd	
1983–84	6	1ª Reg.	1st	
1984–85	5	Reg. Pref.	6th	

Season	Tier	Division	Place	Copa del Rey
1985–86	5	Reg. Pref.	5th	
1986–87	4	3ª	10th	
1987–88	4	3ª	7th	
1988–89	4	3ª	16th	
1989–90	4	3ª	4th	
1990–91	4	3ª	17th	
1991–92	5	Reg. Pref.	2nd	
1992–93	4	3ª	15th	
1993–94	4	3ª	10th	
1994–95	4	3ª	12th	
1995–96	4	3ª	17th	
1996–97	4	3ª	13th	
1997–98	4	3ª	16th	
1998–99	4	3ª	16th	
1999–2000	4	3ª	18th	
2000–01	5	Reg. Pref.	11th	
2001–02	5	Reg. Pref.	9th	
2002–03	5	Reg. Pref.	6th	
2003–04	5	Reg. Pref.	13th	
2004–05	5	Reg. Pref.	1st	

Season	Tier	Division	Place	Copa del Rey
2005–06	4	3ª	19th	
2006–07	5	Reg. Pref.	1st	
2007–08	4	3ª	5th	
2008–09	4	3ª	5th	
2009–10	4	3ª	6th	
2010–11	4	3ª	7th	
2011–12	4	3ª	5th	
2012–13	4	3ª	1st	
2013–14	4	3ª	2nd	First round
2014–15	4	3ª	2nd	
2015–16	4	3ª	3rd	
2016–17	4	3ª	5th	
2017–18	4	3ª	2nd	
2018–19	4	3ª	6th	
2019–20	4	3ª	2nd	
2020–21	4	3ª	1st / 2nd	First round
2021–22	4	2ª RFEF	6th	First round
2022–23	4	2ª Fed.	8th	
2023–24	4	2ª Fed.	14th	
2024–25	5	3ª Fed.	3rd	

Season	Tier	Division	Place	Copa del Rey
2025–26	5	3ª Fed.	5th	
2026–27	5	3ª Fed.		

- 3 seasons in Segunda Federación/Segunda División RFEF
- 28 seasons in Tercera División
- 3 seasons in Tercera Federación
