= Valliniello =

Valliniello / Navarro
- Parish
- Location within Spain
- Country: Spain
- Autonomous community: Asturias
- Province: Asturias
- Municipality: Avilés

Population
  - Total: 1.147

Valliniello, also known as Navarro and officially named as Valliniello / Navarro, is one of the six parishes (administrative divisions) in Avilés, a municipality within the province and autonomous community of Asturias, in northern Spain.

It covers an area of 8.36 km^{2} (3.23 sq mi) and had a population of 1,147 (INE 2011).

== Villages ==
- La Cabián
- Campo de la Iglesia
- Campo de Vega
- Les Canteres
- Los Carbayedos
- El Cueto
- La Escucha
- L'Estrellín
- La Granda
- Los Guardaos
- Llantao
- Piedramenuda
- La Quintana Pedro
- El Refurao
- El Retumés
- San Sebastián
- Tabiella
- Tetuán
- Tuñes
- Vallines
- Villanueva
