= Fontellas =

Municipality of Spain

Coordinates: 42°01′N 1°34′W

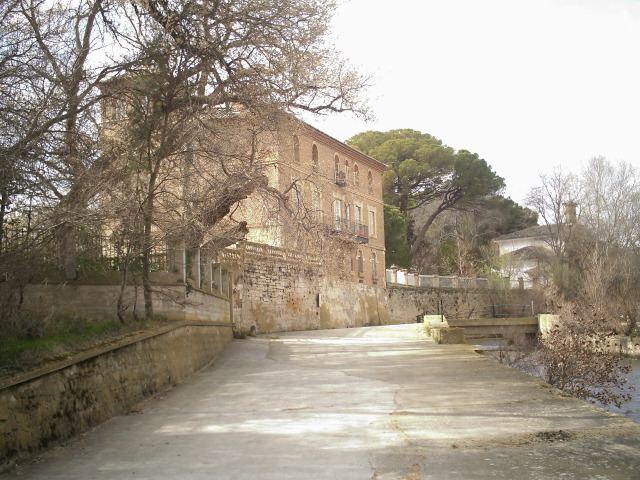

Fontellas is a town and municipality located in the province and autonomous community of Navarre, northern Spain.The town and municipality is linked to the Marquisate of Fontellas.
