= UC La Estrella =

U.C. La Estrella
- Full name: Unión Cultural La Estrella
- Founded: 1968
- Stadium: Polideportivo Municipal Cipriano Tinoco, Los Santos de Maimona, Extremadura, Spain
- Capacity: 2,500
- Chairman: (Spain) Fran Alburquerque
- Coach: (Spain) Víctor Montaño
- League: Primera Extremeña – Group 4
- 2024–25: Primera Extremeña – Group 4, 1st of 12 (champions)
Home colours	Away colours

Unión Cultural La Estrella is a football team based in Los Santos de Maimona, in the autonomous community of Extremadura, in Spain. Founded in 1968, it plays in Primera Extremeña – Group 4.

== Season to season ==
Temporada	Tier	Division	Position	Copa del Rey
1968–69	5	2ª Reg.	4th	
1969–70	5	2ª Reg.	4th	
1970–71	5	2ª Reg.	6th	
1971–72	5	2ª Reg.	9th	
1972–73	5	1ª Reg.	1st	
1973–74	4	1ª Reg.	11th	
1974–75	4	Reg. Pref.	13th	
1975–76	4	Reg. Pref.	11th	
1976–77	4	Reg. Pref.	6th	
1977–78	5	Reg. Pref.	9th	
1978–79	5	Reg. Pref.	5	
1979–80	5	Reg. Pref.	13th	
1980–81	5	Reg. Pref.	1st	
1981–82	4	3ª	19th	
1982–83	5	Reg. Pref.	1st	
1983–84	4	3ª	11th	
1984–85	4	3ª	10th	
1985–86	4	3ª	8th	
1986–87	4	3ª	10th	
1987–88	4	3ª	10th	

Season	Tier	Division	Place	Copa del Rey
1988–89	4	3ª	10th	
1989–90	4	3ª	16th	
1990–91	4	3ª	17th	
1991–92	4	3ª	11th	
1992–93	4	3ª	14th	
1993–94	4	3ª	14th	
1994–95	4	3ª	12th	
1995–96	4	3ª	11th	
1996–97	4	3ª	8th	
1997–98	4	3ª	13th	
1998–99	4	3ª	15th	
1999–2000	4	3ª	17th	
2000–01	4	3ª	10th	
2001–02	4	3ª	13th	
2002–03	4	3ª	13th	
2003–04	4	3ª	14th	
2004–05	4	3ª	13th	
2005–06	4	3ª	10th	
2006–07	4	3ª	11th	
2007–08	4	3ª	12th	

Season	Tier	Division	Place	Copa del Rey
2008–09	4	3ª	11th	
2009–10	4	3ª	19th	
2010–11	5	Reg. Pref.	9th	
2011–12	5	Reg. Pref.	9th	
2012–13	5	Reg. Pref.	5th	
2013–14	5	Reg. Pref.	2nd	
2014–15	5	Reg. Pref.	1st	
2015–16	5	Reg. Pref.	1st	
2016–17	4	3ª	20th	
2017–18	5	1ª Ext.	4th	
2018–19	5	1ª Ext.	4th	
2019–20	5	1ª Ext.	1st	
2020–21	5	1ª Ext.	3rd	
2021–22	6	1ª Ext.	1st	
2022–23	5	3ª Fed.	16th	
2023–24	6	1ª Ext.	2nd	
2024–25	6	1ª Ext.	1st	
2025–26	6	1ª Ext.		

- 29 seasons in Tercera División
- 1 season in Tercera Federación

== Trofeo Villa de Los Santos ==
Season	Edition	Champion	Runner-up	Third place	Fourth place
1975	1				
1976	2	Extremadura CF	UC La Estrella	CD Azuaga	SP Villafranca
1977	3	CD Díter Zafra	UC La Estrella		
1978	4	CD Díter Zafra	UC La Estrella	SG Sacavenense	
1979	5	SP Villafranca	CD Díter Zafra	UC La Estrella	
1980	6	CD Díter Zafra	SP Villafranca	UC La Estrella	
1981	7	UC La Estrella	CD Villanovense	UD Montijo	
1982	8	SP Villafranca	UC La Estrella	AD Puebla Patria	
1983	9	UC La Estrella	CD Villanovense	CP Vasco Nuñez	UD Fuente de Cantos
1984	10	CD Díter Zafra	UC La Estrella	CP Vasco Nuñez	Extremadura CF
1985	11	UC La Estrella	CD Díter Zafra	SP Villafranca	CP Vasco Nuñez
1986	12	UC La Estrella	CD Díter Zafra	SP Villafranca	CD La Albuera
1987	13	UC La Estrella	CD Díter Zafra	CP Vasco Nuñez	Sevilla Atlético
1988	14	Extremadura CF	UC La Estrella	SP Villafranca	CP Gran Maestre
1989	15	Real Madrid U19	Atlético Madrid U19	Real Betis U19	UC La Estrella
1990	16	Real Madrid U19	Sevilla FC U19	UC La Estrella	Real Betis U19
1991	17	UC La Estrella	Real Madrid U19	Sevilla FC U19	CD Badajoz U19
1992	18	Real Betis U19	Valencia CF U19	Real Madrid U19	UC La Estrella
1993	19	UC La Estrella	UD Fornacense	CD Monesterio	CD Díter Zafra
1994	20	UC La Estrella	CD Díter Zafra	UD Frexnense	
1995	21	Jerez CF	UC La Estrella	CP Olivenza	CD Díter Zafra
1996	22	UC La Estrella	Jerez CF	Olímpica Valverdeña CF	CD Díter Zafra
1997	23	CD Díter Zafra	Alético Madrid B	Real Betis B	UC La Estrella
1998	24	CD Díter Zafra	UC La Estrella	Extremadura CF	
1999	25	UC La Estrella	SP Villafranca	CD Díter Zafra	CP Gran Maestre
2000	26	CD Díter Zafra	CF Extremadura	UC La Estrella	Real Bteis B
2001	27	UC La Estrella	CP Gran Maestre	Jerez CF	SP Villafranca
2002	28	UC La Estrella	CD Badajoz U19	Sevilla FC U19	Recreativo de Huelva U19
2003	29	CF Extremadura	Jerez CF	Mérida UD	UC La Estrella
2004	30	UC La Estrella	CD Díter Zafra	Jerez CF	Mérida UD
2005	31	UC La Estrella	CD Díter Zafra	CD Santa Marta	
2006	32	UC La Estrella	AD Cerro de Reyes	CF Extremadura	
2007	33	Mérida UD	UC La Estrella	CD Díter Zafra	
2008	34	CD Díter Zafra	UC La Estrella	Extremadura UD	
2009	35	UC La Estrella	Mérida UD	CP Gran Maestre	
2010	36	UC La Estrella	CP Belenense	UD Calzadilla	
2011	37	Extremadura UD	SP Villafranca	UC La Estrella	
2012	38	UC La Estrella	UD Calzadilla	UD Fuente de Cantos	
2013	39	CD Díter Zafra	UC La Estrella	UD Frexnense	
2014	40	Extremadura UD	UC La Estrella	CD Díter Zafra	
2015	41	CD Díter Zafra	UC La Estrella	SP Villafranca	
2016	42	UC La Estrella	CP Gran Maestre	CD Díter Zafra	
2017	43	EMD Aceuchal	UC La Estrella	UD Fuente de Cantos	
2018	44	UC La Estrella	CP Gran Maestre	SP Villafranca	
2019	45	UC La Estrella	SP Villafranca	CD Díter Zafra	
2020					
2021	46	UC La Estrella	CD Díter Zafra		
2022	47	CF Trujillo	UC La Estrella		
2023	48	UC La Estrella	CD Díter Zafra		
2024	49	UC La Estrella	CD Berlanga		
2025	50	Jerez CF	UC La Estrella		
