= Javier Pereira (footballer) =

Spanish football manager

Personal information
- Full name: Francisco Javier Pereira Megía
- Date of birth: 13 May 1966 (age 60)
- Place of birth: Badajoz, Spain
- Position: Winger

Youth career
- Salesianos

Senior career*
Years	Team	Apps	(Gls)
1984–1985	Badajoz	1	(0)
1986–1987	Montijo		
- Díter Zafra
- Puebla Patria
- Sanvicenteño
- Guadiana

Managerial career
- 2001–2003: Badajoz B
- 2003–2005: Don Benito
- 2007–2008: Salamanca (assistant)
- 2008–2009: Albacete (assistant)
- 2009–2010: Alavés
- 2010–2011: Cartagena (assistant)
- 2011–2013: Levante (assistant)
- 2013–2014: Valladolid (assistant)
- 2014–2015: Watford (assistant)
- 2015–2018: Fulham (assistant)
- 2018–2019: Chongqing Lifan (assistant)
- 2019–2020: Fulham (sporting director)
- 2020–2021: Henan Jianye
- 2021–2022: Levante
- 2022–2023: Henan SSLM
- 2023–2024: Shanghai Port
- 2024–2025: Watford (technical director)
- * Club domestic league appearances and goals

Francisco Javier Pereira Megía (Spanish pronunciation: [xaˈβjeɾ peˈɾejɾa]; born 13 May 1966) is a Spanish football manager and former player who played as a right winger.

== Playing career ==
Born in Badajoz, Extremadura, Pereira only played amateur football during his career. After notably playing one match for Segunda División B side CD Badajoz in the 1984–85 season, he went on to represent UD Montijo, CD Díter Zafra, AD Puebla Patria, CP Sanvicenteño and CD Guadiana.

Pereira eventually retired at the age of just 28, after having degrees in Law and Psychology and a job at the Social security of his hometown.

== Managerial career ==
After retiring, Pereira started his managerial career in 2001, with former side Badajoz's reserve team. On 18 July 2003, he was named manager of Tercera División side CD Don Benito, achieving promotion to the third division in his first season but being sacked in March 2005; his club suffered relegation nonetheless. He eventually returned to Don Benito in 2006, but as a sporting director.

In 2007, Pereira left Don Benito to join Juan Ignacio Martínez's staff at UD Salamanca, as his assistant manager. The duo also worked together at Albacete Balompié before the appointment of Pereira as Deportivo Alavés manager on 22 June 2009.

Pereira left Alavés on 1 February 2010, Pereira returned to his previous role as JIM's assistant at Cartagena, Levante and Valladolid. In 2014 he moved abroad, joining Óscar García's staff at Watford, and continued at the club despite García's departure, working as an assistant of subsequent managers Billy McKinlay and Slaviša Jokanović.

Pereira continued to work with Jokanović in the following three seasons, being his assistant at Fulham. In 2018, after Jokanović was fired, Pereira joined Jordi Cruyff's staff at Chongqing Lifan.

On 30 January 2020, Pereira returned to Fulham as an Assistant Director of Football Operations. He moved back to China on 11 September, after being named manager of Henan Jianye. He steered the club to safety in the relegation play-off, courtesy of four wins and two draws.

In October 2021, Pereira rescinded his contract in Asia and came home to manage struggling La Liga side Levante UD for the rest of the season, with two more campaigns as option. At the turn of the year, he returned to the Chinese Super League, joining the renamed Henan Songshan Longmen. In the following year, he joined Shanghai Port where he won the tile for the second time in club's history. In August 2024, Pereira returned to England as a Technical Director, of Watford F.C. for the rest of the 2024–25 English Championship season.

== Personal life ==
Pereira's father José Luis was also a footballer. A midfielder, his professional inputs consisted of 31 appearances in three seasons with CF Extremadura and Badajoz.

== Managerial statistics ==
As of 31 December 2023

Managerial record by team and tenure
Team	Nat	From	To	Record							
Team	Nat	From	To	G	W	D	L	GF	GA	GD	Win %
Don Benito	(Spain)	18 July 2003	17 March 2005	74	34	21	19	108	51	+57	45.95
Alavés	(Spain)	9 July 2009	1 February 2010	28	10	11	7	35	24	+11	35.71
Henan Jianye	(China)	11 September 2020	6 October 2021	20	8	8	4	22	19	+3	40.00
Levante	(Spain)	7 October 2021	29 November 2021	7	0	3	4	7	15	−8	0.00
Henan Songshan Longmen	(China)	9 January 2022	28 February 2023	35	18	8	9	62	33	+29	51.43
Shanghai Port	(China)	1 March 2023	31 December 2023	33	20	6	7	69	39	+30	60.61
Total				197	90	57	50	303	181	+122	45.69

== Honours ==
Shanghai Port

- Chinese Super League: 2023
