= 2012–13 Copa Federación de España =

Copa RFEF

Tournament details
- Country: Spain
- Teams: 37 (in national phase)

Final positions
- Champions: Sant Andreu
- Runners-up: La Hoya Lorca

Tournament statistics
- Matches played: 61
- Goals scored: 179 (2.93 per match)
- Top goal scorer: Quim Araujo (Sant Andreu) 9

The 2012–13 Copa Federación de España is the 20th staging of the Copa Federación de España, a knockout competition for Spanish football clubs in Segunda División B and Tercera División.

The competition began on 1 August 2012.

== Autonomous Communities tournaments ==
=== Andalusia and Ceuta tournament ===
Only Coria joins the tournament.

=== Andalusia and Melilla tournament ===
Only Almería B joins the tournament.

=== Aragon tournament ===
==== First round ====
Team 1	Agg.	Team 2	1st leg	2nd leg
Barbastro	3–4	Andorra	2–1	1–3
Cuarte Industrial	2–6	Sariñena	1–2	1–4
Calatayud	1–2	Teruel	1–1	0–1
Valdefierro	1–9	Zaragoza B	0–3	1–6

==== Semifinals ====
Team 1	Agg.	Team 2	1st leg	2nd leg
Sariñena	1–1 (a)	Andorra	0–0	1–1
Teruel	1–6	Zaragoza B	1–6	0–0

==== Final ====
Team 1	Agg.	Team 2	1st leg	2nd leg
Sariñena	2–6	Zaragoza B	1–3	1–3

=== Asturias tournament ===
==== Qualifying tournament ====
===== Group A =====
Team	Pld	W	D	L	GF	GA	GD	Pts
Tuilla	4	2	2	0	10	2	+8	8
Condal	4	2	0	2	5	9	–4	6
Covadonga	4	0	2	2	3	7	–4	2

	Con	Cov	Tui
Condal		3–0	0–3
Covadonga	1–2		0–0
Tuilla	5–0	2–2	

===== Group B =====
Team	Pld	W	D	L	GF	GA	GD	Pts
Langreo	4	3	0	1	9	4	+5	9
Real Avilés	4	3	0	1	9	5	+4	9
Llanes	4	0	0	4	1	10	–9	0

	Lan	Lla	Avi
Langreo		2–0	2–1
Llanes	0–3		0–2
Real Avilés	3–2	3–1	

===== Group C =====
Team	Pld	W	D	L	GF	GA	GD	Pts
Marino	4	3	1	0	9	1	+8	10
Candás	4	1	1	2	4	8	–4	4
Universidad	4	1	0	3	4	8	–4	3

	Can	Mar	Uni
Candás		1–1	1–4
Marino	3–0		1–0
Universidad	0–2	0–4	

===== Group D =====
Team	Pld	W	D	L	GF	GA	GD	Pts
Sporting B	4	2	2	0	6	2	+4	8
Cudillero	4	1	3	0	4	3	+1	6
Luarca	4	0	1	3	3	8	–5	1

	Cud	Lua	SpB
Cudillero		1–0	0–0
Luarca	2–2		0–3
Sporting B	1–1	2–1	

==== Semifinals ====
Team 1	Agg.	Team 2	1st leg	2nd leg
Tuilla	4–4 (a)	Langreo	2–0	2–4
Marino	1–2	Sporting B	0–1	1–1

==== Final ====
Team 1	Score	Team 2
Tuilla	2–0	Sporting B

=== Balearic Islands tournament ===
==== First round ====
Team 1	Agg.	Team 2	1st leg	2nd leg
Montuïri	2–1	Llosetense	2–0	0–1
Santa Eulàlia	4–1	San Rafael	2–0	2–1

==== Semifinal ====
Team 1	Agg.	Team 2	1st leg	2nd leg
Mallorca B	3–0	Montuïri	1–0	2–0

==== Final ====
Team 1	Agg.	Team 2	1st leg	2nd leg
Santa Eulàlia	0–3	Mallorca B	0–0	0–3

- Awarded

=== Basque Country tournament ===
==== Final ====
Team 1	Agg.	Team 2	1st leg	2nd leg
Aurrerá	3–8	Zalla	2–3	1–5

=== Canary Islands tournament ===
Only Tenerife B joins the tournament.

=== Cantabria tournament ===
==== Semifinals ====
Team 1	Agg.	Team 2	1st leg	2nd leg
Cayón	4–5	Rayo Cantabria	2–0	2–5
Guarnizo	1–3	Racing Santander B	1–1	0–2

==== Final ====
Team 1	Agg.	Team 2	1st leg	2nd leg
Racing Santander B	5–1	Rayo Cantabria	3–1	2–0

=== Castile and León tournament ===
==== Semifinals ====
Team 1	Agg.	Team 2	1st leg	2nd leg
Burgos	3–1	Palencia	1–1	2–0
Arandina	4–2	Cristo Atlético	2–0	2–2

==== Final ====
Team 1	Agg.	Team 2	1st leg	2nd leg
Arandina	1–2	Burgos	0–2	1–0

=== Castile-La Mancha tournament ===
==== Semifinals ====
Team 1	Agg.	Team 2	1st leg	2nd leg
Villarrubia	2–0	Puertollano	2–0	–

==== Final ====
Team 1	Agg.	Team 2	1st leg	2nd leg
Villarrubia	4–2	Ciudad Real	3–1	1–1

=== Catalonia tournament ===
==== Final ====
Team 1	Agg.	Team 2	1st leg	2nd leg
Sant Andreu	2–2 (5–4 p)	Pobla Mafumet	2–0	0–2

=== Extremadura tournament ===
==== First round ====
Team 1	Score	Team 2
Montehermoso	1–3	Plasencia
Olivenza	1–0	Valverdeño
Emérita Augusta	1–1 (5–4 p)	Díter Zafra
Jerez	1–1 (4–5 p)	Fuente Cantos

==== Second round ====
Team 1	Score	Team 2
Emérita Augusta	1–0	Plasencia
Olivenza	3–0	Talarrubias

==== Third round ====
Team 1	Score	Team 2
Olivenza	2–2 (p)	Fuente Cantos

==== Final ====
Team 1	Score	Team 2
Emérita Augusta	2–1	Fuente Cantos

=== Galicia tournament ===
==== First round ====
Team 1	Agg.	Team 2	1st leg	2nd leg
Pontevedra	3–4	Cerceda	1–1	2–3
Rápido Bouzas	3–2	Alondras	3–2	0–0

==== Semifinal ====
Team 1	Agg.	Team 2	1st leg	2nd leg
Coruxo	2–3	Rápido Bouzas	2–1	0–2

==== Final ====
Team 1	Score	Team 2
Rápido Bouzas	4–2	Cerceda

=== La Rioja tournament ===
==== First round ====
Team 1	Score	Team 2
Arnedo	2–2 (p)	Náxara

==== Semifinals ====
Team 1	Score	Team 2
Varea	3–2	Alfaro
Haro	0–0 (p)	Náxara

==== Final ====
Team 1	Score	Team 2
Náxara	3–2	Varea

=== Madrid tournament ===
==== Qualifying tournament ====
===== Group 1 =====
Team	Pld	W	D	L	GF	GA	GD	Pts
SS Reyes	6	5	1	0	11	3	+8	16
Alcalá	6	3	0	3	6	4	+2	9
Atlético Pinto	6	2	2	2	6	9	–3	8
Internacional	6	0	1	5	6	13	–7	1

	Alc	Int	SSR	AtP
Alcalá		1–0	1–2	3–0
Internacional	0–1		1–2	2–3
SS Reyes	1–0	4–1		0–0
Atlético Pinto	1–0	2–2	0–2	

===== Group 2 =====
Team	Pld	W	D	L	GF	GA	GD	Pts
Puerta Bonita	4	2	2	0	7	2	+5	8
Carabanchel	4	2	2	0	10	6	+4	8
Rayo Vallecano B	4	0	0	4	4	13	–9	0

	Pue	RaB	Car
Puerta Bonita		3–0	1–1
Rayo Vallecano B	0–2		1–2
Carabanchel	1–1	6–3	

==== Final ====
Team 1	Agg.	Team 2	1st leg	2nd leg
Puerta Bonita	3–2	SS Reyes	2–1	1–1

=== Murcia tournament ===
==== Semifinals ====
Team 1	Score	Team 2
Molina	0–3	La Hoya Lorca
Bala Azul	0–1	Plus Ultra

==== Final ====
Team 1	Score	Team 2
La Hoya Lorca	2–1	Plus Ultra

=== Navarre tournament ===
==== Final ====
Team 1	Agg.	Team 2	1st leg	2nd leg
Valtierrano	3–3 (a)	Valle de Egüés	1–1	2–2

=== Valencian Community tournament ===
Only At. Saguntino joins the tournament.

== Teams directly qualified for national phase ==
=== Current champion ===
- Binissalem

=== Teams losing Copa del Rey first round ===
- Marino
- Real Ávila
- Fuenlabrada
- UD Logroñés
- Amorebieta (withdrew)
- Laudio
- Peña Sport
- Orihuela
- Villarrobledo
- At. Baleares (withdrew)
- Yeclano
- Gimnàstic de Tarragona (withdrew)
- Badalona (withdrew)
- San Roque
- La Roda
- Loja
- Cartagena
- Catarroja

== National phase ==
=== Qualifying round ===
Team 1	Agg.	Team 2	1st leg	2nd leg
Orihuela (Valencian Community)	1–3	(Region of Murcia) La Hoya Lorca	1–0	0–3

==== First leg ====
8 November 2012
21:00

Orihuela	1–0	La Hoya Lorca
Álex Espinosa 19'

Estadio Municipal Los Arcos, Orihuela, Alicante
Attendance: 250

==== Second leg ====
14 November 2012
20:45

La Hoya Lorca	3–0	Orihuela
Josan 25'; Carlos Rodríguez 67'; Nico (penalty missed); Armando 90+2'

Francisco Artés Carrasco, Lorca, Murcia
Attendance: 100

La Hoya Lorca won 3–1 on aggregate

=== Round of 32 ===
The draw for the qualifying round and Round of 32 was October 30. The tie was decided over two legs between 28 November and 6 December 2012.

Team 1	Agg.	Team 2	1st leg	2nd leg
Puerta Bonita (Community of Madrid)	3–4	(Castilla–La Mancha) Villarrubia	1–1	2–3
Real Ávila (Castile and León)	1–9	(Community of Madrid) Fuenlabrada	1–5	0–4
At. Saguntino (Valencian Community)	4–2	(Valencian Community) Catarroja	2–2	2–0
La Roda (Castilla–La Mancha)	0–1	(Castilla–La Mancha) Villarrobledo	0–1	0–0
Burgos (Castile and León)	2–1	(Cantabria) Racing Santander B	0–1	2–0
Rápido Bouzas (Galicia (Spain))	4–0	(Asturias) Tuilla	2–0	2–0
Marino (Canary Islands)		(Canary Islands) Tenerife B	w.o.	–
Mallorca B (Balearic Islands)	1–1 (a)	(Balearic Islands) Binissalem	1–1	0–0
Loja (Andalusia)	9–2	(Extremadura) Emérita Augusta	7–0	2–2
San Roque (Andalusia)	3–3 (3–1 p)	(Andalusia) Coria	2–1	1–2
Zaragoza B (Aragon)	2–0	(La Rioja) Náxara	1–0	1–0
Sant Andreu (Catalonia)	5–2	(La Rioja) UD Logroñés	3–1	2–1
Cartagena (Region of Murcia)	4–3	(Region of Murcia) Yeclano	3–0	1–3
Almería B (Andalusia)	1–1 (2–4 p)	(Region of Murcia) La Hoya Lorca	1–0	0–1
Valtierrano (Navarre)	0–5	(Navarre) Peña Sport	0–2	0–3
Zalla (Basque Country (autonomous community))	1–5	(Basque Country (autonomous community)) Laudio	1–2	0–3

==== First leg ====
29 November 2012
20:00

Puerta Bonita	1–1	Villarrubia
Alex García 68'		Luque 50'

Antiguo Canódromo, Madrid
29 November 2012
20:00

Real Ávila	1–5	Fuenlabrada
Rubo 45+2'		Ryan Harper 7' 56'; Jesús Rubio 11'; Molina 64'; Fran Dorado 75'

Adolfo Suárez, Ávila
Attendance: 100
29 November 2012
19:30

At. Saguntino	2–2	Catarroja
Richi Moreno 13'; Rafa Pérez 85'		Bleda 57'; Miguel Ángel 80'

Camp Nou de Morvedre, Sagunto, Valencia
29 November 2012
21:00

La Roda	0–1	Villarrobledo
		Abengózar (penalty missed); Xabi Soria 64'

Municipal, La Roda, Albacete
28 November 2012
20:30

Burgos	0–1	Racing B
		Montiel 83'

El Plantío, Burgos
Attendance: 500
29 November 2012
17:30

Rápido Bouzas	2–0	Tuilla
Jaime Agujetas 23'; Carlos Abalde 63'

Baltasar Pujales, Vigo
28 November 2012
19:00

Mallorca B	1–1	Binissalem
Cedric Omoigui 22'		Toni Oliver 57'

Son Bibiloni, Palma de Mallorca
Attendance: 100
29 November 2012
15:45

Loja	7–0	Emérita Augusta
Javi Salmerón 28' 46' 86'; Gato 40'; Ramiro 50' 60'; Oli 67'

Medina Lauxa, Loja, Granada
Attendance: 300
28 November 2012
21:00

San Roque	2–1	Coria
Aurelio (o.g.) 16'; Saavedra 86'		Manu Fidalgo 73'

Ciudad de Lepe, Lepe, Huelva
28 November 2012
18:00

Zaragoza B	1–0	Náxara
Carlos Hernández 73'

Ciudad Deportiva, Zaragoza
Attendance: 250
28 November 2012
19:30

Sant Andreu	3–1	UD Logroñés
David Llobet 70' 89'; Quim Araujo 77'		Mario Barco 85'

Narcís Sala, Barcelona
Attendance: 250
28 November 2012
17:30

Cartagena	3–0	Yeclano
Akinsola 21'; Fran (o.g.) 65'; Perona (p.) 90'

Cartagonova, Cartagena, Murcia
28 November 2012
20:30

Almería B	1–0	La Hoya Lorca
Kike 78'

Anexo del Juegos Mediterráneos, Almería
Attendance: 100
28 November 2012
20:00

Valtierrano	0–2	Peña Sport
		Fermín Úriz 60'; Javi Jiménez 89'

Las Tejerías, Valtierra, Navarre
28 November 2012
20:00

Zalla	1–2	Laudio
Niko Ybarra 68'		Kepa del Olmo 6'; Gaizka Bergara 51'

Landaberri, Zalla, Biscay

==== Second leg ====
6 December 2012
16:00

Villarrubia	3–2	Puerta Bonita
Wuy 55'; Moraga 60'; Chucho 90+2'		Mario 17'; Álex 33'

Municipal, Villarrubia de los Ojos, Ciudad Real

Villarrubia won 4–3 on aggregate

6 December 2012
12:00

Fuenlabrada	4–0	Real Ávila
Ryan Harper 25' 72'; Molino 48' 85'

Fernando Torres, Fuenlabrada, Madrid

Fuenlabrada won 9–1 on aggregate

5 December 2012
20:00

Catarroja	0–2	At. Saguntino
		Cristian Contreras 12'; Richi Moreno 17'; Rober (penalty missed)

Mundial 82, Catarroja, Valencia

At. Saguntino won 4–2 on aggregate

6 December 2012
17:00

Villarrobledo	0–0	La Roda

Nuestra Señora de la Caridad, Villarrobledo, Albacete
Attendance: 500

Villarrobledo won 1–0 on aggregate

5 December 2012
15:00

Racing B	0–2	Burgos
		Arkaitz Ruiz 15' 61'

El Pilar, Guarnizo, Cantabria
Attendance: 200

Burgos won 2–1 on aggregate

6 December 2012
18:00

Tuilla	0–2	Rápido Bouzas
		Pablo Carnero 19'; Óscar Pardavila 75'

El Candín, Tuilla, Langreo, Asturias
Attendance: 500

Rápido de Bouzas won 4–0 on aggregate

6 December 2012
12:00

Binissalem	0–0	Mallorca B

Miquel Pons, Binissalem, Majorca

Binissalem won 1–1 on away goals rule

6 December 2012
12:00

Emérita Augusta	2–2	Loja
Grego 12'; Rubia 85'		Pedro Corral 49'; Míchel 60'

Emérita Augusta, Mérida, Badajoz
Attendance: 200

Loja won 9–2 on aggregate

6 December 2012
12:00

Coria	2–1 (a.e.t.)	San Roque
Rubén Sánchez 67'; Juanma 78'		Boateng 47'

Guadalquivir, Coria del Río, Seville
Attendance: 1500

San Roque won after extra time and penalty shootout (1–3)

6 December 2012
17:00

Náxara	0–1	Zaragoza B
		Moha 90+2'

La Salera, Nájera, La Rioja
Attendance: 700

Zaragoza B won 2–0 on aggregate

5 December 2012

UD Logroñés	1–2	Sant Andreu
Quero 4'		Xavi Jiménez 25'; Quim Araujo 53'

Las Gaunas, Logroño, La Rioja
Attendance: 200

Sant Andreu won 5–2 on aggregate

6 December 2012
11:45

Yeclano	3–1	Cartagena
Micky 10'; Matas 86' 90+3'		Akinsola 62'

La Constitución, Yecla, Murcia
Attendance: 200

Cartagena won 4–3 on aggregate

6 December 2012
17:00

La Hoya Lorca	1–0 (a.e.t.)	Almería B
Carrasco 62'

Francisco Artés Carrasco, Lorca, Murcia
Attendance: 1200

La Hoya Lorca won after extra time and penalty shootout (4–2)

6 December 2012
12:00

Peña Sport	3–0	Valtierrano
Liébana 35'; Rodrigo (p) 39'; Jiménez (p) 53'

San Francisco, Tafalla, Navarre
Attendance: 150

Peña Sport won 5–0 on aggregate

5 December 2012
20:00

Laudio	3–0	Zalla
Galder 53'; Carreño 76'; Del Álamo 77'

Ellakuri, Laudio/Llodio, Álava

Laudio won 5–1 on aggregate

=== Round of 16 ===
The draw was held on December 14. The tie will be decided over two legs between days 10 and 24 January 2013.

Team 1	Agg.	Team 2	1st leg	2nd leg
Peña Sport (Navarre)	5–2	(Basque Country (autonomous community)) Laudio	4–1	1–1
Burgos (Castile and León)	5–2	(Galicia (Spain)) Rápido Bouzas	3–2	2–0
Sant Andreu (Catalonia)	7–5	(Castilla–La Mancha) Villarrobledo	5–1	2–4
At. Saguntino (Valencian Community)	3–9	(Aragon) Zaragoza B	2–6	1–3
Tenerife B (Canary Islands)	5–3	(Community of Madrid) Fuenlabrada	4–1	1–2
Villarrubia (Castilla–La Mancha)	1–1 (a)	(Balearic Islands) Binissalem	1–1	0–0
Cartagena (Region of Murcia)	4–2	(Andalusia) San Roque	4–0	0–2
La Hoya Lorca (Region of Murcia)	5–1	(Andalusia) Loja	4–1	1–0

==== First leg ====
9 January 2013
19:30

Peña Sport	4–1	Laudio
Rodrigo Sanz 43' 46'; Gaizka (o.g.) 49'; Borja Arrondo 75'		Ander del Álamo 24'

San Francisco, Tafalla, Navarre
Attendance: 150
10 January 2013
20:30

Burgos	3–2	Rápido Bouzas
Carralero 47'; Pacheta 52'; Arkaitz 67'		Marcos 9'; Jacobo 42'

El Plantío, Burgos
Attendance: 1.000
9 January 2013
19:30

Sant Andreu	5–1	Villarrobledo
Josu 33' 59' 90+3'; Edgar (p) 44'; Quim Araujo 67'		Espinosa 78'

Narcís Sala, Barcelona
Attendance: 500
9 January 2013
19:00

At. Saguntino	2–6	Zaragoza B
Serrano (p) 1'; Mico 75'		Gassama 3'; Antón 14' 17'; Jorge Ortí 57' 81'; Moha 71'

Camp Nou de Morvedre, Sagunto, Valencia
9 January 2013
20:30

Tenerife B	4–1	Fuenlabrada
Alberto 33'; Ayoze Pérez 57'; Nano 71'; Chirri 74'		Diego 81'

Ciudad Deportiva, Tenerife, Canary Islands
Attendance: 100
9 January 2013
19:00

Villarrubia	1–1	Binissalem
Jesuto (p) 55'		Tito 18'

Municipal, Villarrubia de los Ojos, Ciudad Real
9 January 2013
20:30

Cartagena	4–0	San Roque
Riau 4' 43'; Sergio Jiménez 28'; Ramón Arcas 48'

Cartagonova, Cartagena, Murcia
9 January 2013
20:30

La Hoya Lorca	4–1	Loja
Nico 44' 68'; Álex 50'; Bienve 52'		Oli 73'

Francisco Artés Carrasco, Lorca, Murcia

==== Second leg ====
23 January 2013
19:30

Laudio	1–1	Peña Sport
Jarein 71'		Casi 78'

Ellakuri, Laudio/Llodio, Álava

Peña Sport won 5–2 on aggregate

24 January 2013
20:00

Rápido Bouzas	0–2	Burgos
		Gerika 26'; Sergio Torres 85'

Baltasar Pujales, Vigo

Burgos won 5–2 on aggregate

24 January 2013
20:15

Villarrobledo	4–2	Sant Andreu
Carlos Pérez 15'; Alberto Abengózar 27' 41'; Espinosa 76'		Quim Araujo 51'; Josu 83'

Nuestra Señora de la Caridad, Villarrobledo, Albacete

Sant Andreu won 7–5 on aggregate

23 January 2013
16:00

Zaragoza B	3–1	At. Saguntino
Santigosa 55' 72'; Gassama 65'		Giménez 36'

Ciudad Deportiva, Zaragoza

Zaragoza B won 9–3 on aggregate

23 January 2013
20:30

Fuenlabrada	2–1	Tenerife B
Antonio López 23'; Diego 65'		Ayoze 47'

Fernando Torres, Fuenlabrada, Madrid
Attendance: 300

Tenerife B won 5–3 on aggregate

23 January 2013
19:15

Binissalem	0–0	Villarrubia

Miquel Pons, Binissalem, Majorca

Binissalem won 1–1 on away goals rule

23 January 2013
19:30

San Roque	2–0	Cartagena
Santi (p) 27'; Richi 58'

Ciudad de Lepe, Lepe, Huelva

Cartagena won 4–2 on aggregate

24 January 2013
20:00

Loja	0–1	La Hoya Lorca
Óscar García (penalty missed)		Carrasco 90+2'

Medina Lauxa, Loja, Granada

La Hoya Lorca won 5–1 on aggregate

=== Quarter-finals ===
The draw for the quarterfinals was held January 25.

Team 1	Agg.	Team 2	1st leg	2nd leg
Sant Andreu (Catalonia)	7–5 (a.e.t.)	(Navarre) Peña Sport	4–1	3–4
Zaragoza B (Aragon)	2–1	(Castile and León) Burgos	0–0	2–1
Binissalem (Balearic Islands)	2–3	(Region of Murcia) La Hoya Lorca	2–2	0–1
Tenerife B (Canary Islands)	3–3 (a)	(Region of Murcia) Cartagena	0–0	3–3

==== First leg ====
6 February 2013
19:30

Sant Andreu	4–1	Peña Sport
Edgar 11'; Quim Araujo 47'; Azparren 67'; Marc Mas 83'		Rodrigo 55'

Narcís Sala, Barcelona
6 February 2013
16:30

Zaragoza B	0–0	Burgos

Ciudad Deportiva, Zaragoza
6 February 2013
19:00

Binissalem	2–2	La Hoya Lorca
Martí 20'; Óscar Navarro 78'		Nico 35' 55'

Miquel Pons, Binissalem, Majorca
Attendance: 150
6 February 2013
21:00

Tenerife B	0–0	Cartagena
Ayoze (penalty missed)

Ciudad Deportiva, Tenerife, Canary Islands
Attendance: 100

==== Second leg ====
20 February 2013
19:00

Peña Sport	4–3 (a.e.t.)	Sant Andreu
Igotz 5'; Uriz 15'; Castán 27'; Rodrigo 40'		Xavi Boniquet 56'; Quim Araujo 97'; Edgar 111'

San Francisco, Tafalla, Navarre

Sant Andreu won 7–5 on aggregate after extra time

20 February 2013
19:00

Burgos	1–2	Zaragoza B
Nacho Tomás 41'		Tarsi 22'; Gassama 90+4'

El Plantío, Burgos

Zaragoza B won 2–1 on aggregate

21 February 2013
20:30

La Hoya Lorca	1–0	Binissalem
Ginés Meca 40'; Carrasco (penalty missed)

Francisco Artés Carrasco, Lorca, Murcia

La Hoya Lorca won 3–2 on aggregate

20 February 2013
21:00

Cartagena	3–3	Tenerife B
Florian 5'; Cañadas 47'; Raimondi 53'		Ayoze 3' 62'; Jairo 76'

Cartagonova, Cartagena, Murcia

Tenerife B won 3–3 on away goals rule

=== Semi-finals ===
The draw for the semi-finals and Final was held February 22.

Team 1	Agg.	Team 2	1st leg	2nd leg
Zaragoza B (Aragon)	1–2 (a.e.t.)	(Region of Murcia) La Hoya Lorca	1–0	0–2
Sant Andreu (Catalonia)	4–0	(Canary Islands) Tenerife B	2–0	2–0

==== First leg ====
6 March 2013
16:30

Zaragoza B	1–0	La Hoya Lorca
Gassama 27' (penalty missed)

Ciudad Deportiva, Zaragoza
7 March 2013
20:30

Sant Andreu	2–0	Tenerife B
Quim Araujo 14'; Marc Mas 20'

Narcís Sala, Barcelona

==== Second leg ====
19 March 2013
17:00

La Hoya Lorca	2–0 (a.e.t.)	Zaragoza B
Nico 88'; Ochoa 108'

Francisco Artés Carrasco, Lorca, Murcia

La Hoya Lorca won 2–1 on aggregate after extra time

21 March 2013
20:30

Tenerife B	0–2	Sant Andreu
		Quim Araujo 65'; Xavi Boniquet 71'

Ciudad Deportiva, Tenerife, Canary Islands

Sant Andreu won 4–0 on aggregate

=== Final ===
Team 1	Agg.	Team 2	1st leg	2nd leg
La Hoya Lorca (Region of Murcia)	0–4	(Catalonia) Sant Andreu	0–3	0–1

==== First leg ====
4 April 2013
21:00

La Hoya Lorca	0–3	Sant Andreu
Nico (penalty missed)		Xavi Boniquet 52'; Edgar 54'; Marc Mas 87'

Francisco Artés Carrasco, Lorca, Murcia

==== Second leg ====
11 April 2013
20:30

Sant Andreu	1–0	La Hoya Lorca
Quim Araujo 83'

Narcís Sala, Barcelona
