= Sixtus Ogbuehi =

Nigerian footballer

Personal information
- Full name: Nzubechi Sixtus Ogbuehi Ogbuehi
- Date of birth: 15 March 2003 (age 23)
- Place of birth: Owerri, Nigeria
- Height: 1.92 m (6 ft 4 in)
- Position: Forward

Team information
- Current team: Kortrijk
- Number: 90

Senior career*
Years	Team	Apps	(Gls)
2021–2022	Campos FC	16	(9)
2022–2023	Moralo B	4	(1)
2023	→ Montehermoso (loan)	13	(2)
2023–2024	Moralo	14	(8)
2024	Ceuta B	15	(8)
2024–2025	Eldense	6	(0)
2025	→ Osasuna B (loan)	18	(4)
2025–	Kortrijk	24	(1)
- * Club domestic league appearances and goals as of 19 April 2026

Nzubechi Sixtus Ogbuehi Ogbuehi (born 15 March 2003) is a Nigerian footballer who plays as a forward for Belgian club KV Kortrijk.

== Career ==
Born in Owerri, Ogbuehi played for hometown side Campos FC in the Nigeria National League during the 2021–22 season, scoring nine goals in 16 appearances. He subsequently moved to Spain, joining Moralo CP and playing for their reserve team in the Primera División Extremeña before joining Tercera Federación side CP Montehermoso on loan on 29 January 2023.

Ogbuehi returned to Moralo in July 2023, and was promoted to the first team in August after renewing with the club. The following 1 February, after scoring eight goals in just 14 matches, he signed a two-and-a-half-year contract with AD Ceuta FC and was assigned to the reserves also in the fifth division.

On 8 July 2024, after scoring ten goals for Ceuta B, Ogbuehi agreed to a three-year deal with Segunda División side CD Eldense; Ceuta also retained 40% over a future sale. He made his professional debut on 1 September, coming on as a late substitute for Joel Jorquera in a 2–1 home loss to FC Cartagena.

On 14 January 2025, Ogbuehi was loaned to Primera Federación side CA Osasuna B, with a buyout clause. On 25 July, he moved to Challenger Pro League side KV Kortrijk on a three-year contract.
