= CD Miajadas =

Association football club

Miajadas
- Full name: Club Deportivo Miajadas
- Founded: 1965
- Dissolved: 2023
- Ground: Estadio Municipal, Miajadas, Extremadura, Spain
- Capacity: 2,500
- 2022–23: Tercera Federación – Group 14, 14th of 16 (relegated)
Home colours	Away colours

Club Deportivo Miajadas was a Spanish football club based in Miajadas, in the autonomous community of Extremadura. Founded in 1965, it last played in Tercera Federación – Group 14, and held home games at Estadio Municipal de Miajadas, with a 2,500-seat capacity.

On 11 July 2023, Miajadas was dissolved after 78 years of existence.

== Season to season ==
Season	Tier	Division	Place	Copa del Rey
1965–66	4	1ª Reg.	4th	
1966–67	4	1ª Reg.	4th	
1967–68	4	1ª Reg.	7th	
1968–69	DNP			
1969–70	5	2ª Reg.	6th	
1970–71	5	2ª Reg. P.	2nd	
1971–72	5	2ª Reg. P.	1st	
1972–1975	DNP			
1975–76	6	2ª Reg.	2nd	
1976–77	6	2ª Reg.	1st	
1977–78	6	1ª Reg.	6th	
1978–79	6	1ª Reg.	1st	
1979–80	6	1ª Reg.	11th	
1980–81	6	1ª Reg.	4th	
1981–82	6	1ª Reg.	15th	
1982–83	6	1ª Reg.	13th	
1983–84	6	1ª Reg.	6th	
1984–85	6	1ª Reg.	10th	
1985–86	6	1ª Reg.	9th	
1986–87	6	1ª Reg.	2nd	

Season	Tier	Division	Place	Copa del Rey
1987–88	6	1ª Reg.	1st	
1988–89	5	Reg. Pref.	3rd	
1989–90	4	3ª	15th	
1990–91	4	3ª	7th	
1991–92	4	3ª	10th	
1992–93	4	3ª	13th	
1993–94	4	3ª	15th	
1994–95	4	3ª	20th	
1995–96	5	Reg. Pref.	2nd	
1996–97	4	3ª	18th	
1997–98	5	Reg. Pref.	20th	
1998–99	DNP			
1999–2000	6	1ª Reg.	2nd	
2000–01	5	Reg. Pref.	9th	
2001–02	5	Reg. Pref.	6th	
2002–03	5	Reg. Pref.	7th	
2003–04	5	Reg. Pref.	1st	
2004–05	4	3ª	11th	
2005–06	4	3ª	5th	
2006–07	4	3ª	8th	

Season	Tier	Division	Place	Copa del Rey
2007–08	4	3ª	15th	
2008–09	4	3ª	15th	
2009–10	4	3ª	12th	
2010–11	4	3ª	9th	
2011–12	4	3ª	6th	
2012–13	4	3ª	13th	
2013–14	4	3ª	19th	
2014–15	5	Reg. Pref.	14th	

Season	Tier	Division	Place	Copa del Rey
2015–16	5	Reg. Pref.	6th	
2016–17	5	1ª Ext.	5th	
2017–18	5	1ª Ext.	2nd	
2018–19	5	1ª Ext.	3rd	
2019–20	4	3ª	16th	
2020–21	4	3ª	4th / 2nd	
2021–22	5	3ª RFEF	13th	
2022–23	5	3ª Fed.	14th	

- 19 seasons in Tercera División
- 2 seasons in Tercera Federación/Tercera División RFEF
