= CD Cabeza del Buey =

Association football team in Spain

Cabeza del Buey
- Full name: Club Deportivo Cabeza del Buey
- Founded: 1970
- Ground: Municipal, Cabeza del Buey, Extremadura, Spain
- Capacity: 1,000
- President: Sergio Redrejo
- Manager: Fidel Caballero
- League: Tercera Federación – Group 14
- 2025–26: Tercera Federación – Group 14, 6th of 18
Home colours	Away colours

Club Deportivo Cabeza del Buey is a football team based in Cabeza del Buey, in the autonomous community of Extremadura. They play in Tercera Federación – Group 14, holding home matches at the Campo de Fútbol Municipal de Cabeza del Buey, with a capacity of 1,000 people.

== History ==
Without a written history and a clear foundation date, CD Cabeza del Buey started playing in the regional leagues in 1970. In 1992, one year after their first participation in the Regional Preferente, the club was dissolved after having financial troubles.

Back to an active status in 1993, Cabeza del Buey returned to the Preferente in 1997, before suffering relegation to the Primera Regional in 2003. A new relegation followed in 2007, with the club going into inactivity in 2010.

After a sole season in 2011–12, Cabeza del Buey returned to action in 2015, and achieved promotion to the Primera Extremeña in 2020. On 11 May 2025, the club achieved a first-ever promotion to a national division, reaching the Tercera Federación after defeating UC La Estrella in the promotion play-offs.

== Season to season ==
Season	Tier	Division	Place	Copa del Rey
1970–71	5	2ª Reg.	3rd	
1971–72	5	2ª Reg.	2nd	
1972–73	5	2ª Reg.	2nd	
1973–74	5	2ª Reg.	10th	
1974–75	5	1ª Reg.	9th	
1975–76	5	1ª Reg.	14th	
1976–77	5	1ª Reg.	12th	
1977–1981	DNP			
1981–82	6	1ª Reg.	14th	
1982–83	6	1ª Reg.	10th	
1983–84	6	1ª Reg.	16th	
1984–85	6	1ª Reg.	14th	
1985–86	6	1ª Reg.	20th	
1986–87	6	1ª Reg.	21st	
1987–88	6	1ª Reg.	15th	
1988–89	6	1ª Reg.	9th	
1989–90	6	1ª Reg.	2nd	
1990–91	5	Reg. Pref.	18th	
1991–92	6	1ª Reg.	1st	
1992–93	DNP			

Season	Tier	Division	Place	Copa del Rey
1993–94	6	1ª Reg.	13th	
1994–95	6	1ª Reg.	2nd	
1995–96	6	1ª Reg.	4th	
1996–97	6	1ª Reg.	4th	
1997–98	5	Reg. Pref.	17th	
1998–99	5	Reg. Pref.	6th	
1999–2000	5	Reg. Pref.	15th	
2000–01	5	Reg. Pref.	7th	
2001–02	5	Reg. Pref.	10th	
2002–03	5	Reg. Pref.	18th	
2003–04	6	1ª Reg.	2nd	
2004–05	5	Reg. Pref.	11th	
2005–06	5	Reg. Pref.	10th	
2006–07	5	Reg. Pref.	18th	
2007–08	6	1ª Reg.	2nd	
2008–09	6	1ª Reg.	4th	
2009–10	6	1ª Reg.	13th	
2010–11	DNP			
2011–12	6	1ª Reg.	12th	
2012–13	DNP			

Season	Tier	Division	Place	Copa del Rey
2013–14	DNP			
2014–15	DNP			
2015–16	6	1ª Reg.	6th	
2016–17	6	Reg. Pref.	13th	
2017–18	6	Reg. Pref.	5th	
2018–19	6	Reg. Pref.	5th	
2019–20	6	Reg. Pref.	2nd	
2020–21	5	1ª Ext.	6th	
2021–22	6	1ª Ext.	8th	
2022–23	6	1ª Ext.	11th	
2023–24	6	1ª Ext.	6th	
2024–25	6	1ª Ext.	1st	
2025–26	5	3ª Fed.	6th	
2026–27	5	3ª Fed.		

- 2 seasons in Tercera Federación
