= CP Chinato =

Chinato
- Full name: Club Polideportivo Chinato
- Founded: 1969
- Ground: Era de las Matas, Malpartida, Extremadura, Spain
- Capacity: 1,000
- Chairman: (Spain) Antonio José Martínez
- Manager: (Spain) Manuel Fontanilla
- League: Primera Extremeña – Group 1
- 2025–26: Primera Extremeña – Group 1, 2nd of 14
Home colours	Away colours

Club Polideportivo Chinato is a Spanish football team based in Malpartida de Plasencia, in the autonomous community of Extremadura. Founded in 1969, it plays in Primera Extremeña – Group 1, holding home games at Campo de Fútbol Eras de las Matas, with a 1,000-seat capacity.

== Season to season ==
Season	Tier	Division	Place	Copa del Rey
1986–87	6	1ª Reg.	13th	
1987–88	6	1ª Reg.	10th	
1988–89	6	1ª Reg.	10th	
1989–90	6	1ª Reg.	3rd	
1990–91	5	Reg. Pref.	14th	
1991–92	5	Reg. Pref.	6th	
1992–93	5	Reg. Pref.	18th	
1993–94	6	1ª Reg.	3rd	
1994–95	6	1ª Reg.	2nd	
1995–96	5	Reg. Pref.	6th	
1996–97	5	Reg. Pref.	4th	
1997–98	5	Reg. Pref.	5th	
1998–99	5	Reg. Pref.	9th	
1999–2000	5	Reg. Pref.	6th	
2000–01	5	Reg. Pref.	8th	
2001–02	5	Reg. Pref.	7th	
2002–03	5	Reg. Pref.	17th	
2003–04	5	Reg. Pref.	19th	
2004–05	6	1ª Reg.	1st	
2005–06	5	Reg. Pref.	6th	

Season	Tier	Division	Place	Copa del Rey
2006–07	5	Reg. Pref.	6th	
2007–08	5	Reg. Pref.	12th	
2008–09	5	Reg. Pref.	11th	
2009–10	5	Reg. Pref.	11th	
2010–11	5	Reg. Pref.	2nd	
2011–12	4	3ª	20th	
2012–13	5	Reg. Pref.	13th	
2013–14	5	Reg. Pref.	14th	
2014–15	5	Reg. Pref.	10th	
2015–16	5	Reg. Pref.	12th	
2016–17	5	1ª Ext.	7th	
2017–18	5	1ª Ext.	3rd	
2018–19	5	1ª Ext.	5th	
2019–20	5	1ª Ext.	1st	
2020–21	4	3ª	8th	Preliminary
2021–22	6	1ª Ext.	7th	
2022–23	6	1ª Ext.	5th	
2023–24	6	1ª Ext.	1st	
2024–25	6	1ª Ext.	4th	
2025–26	6	1ª Ext.	2nd	

Season	Tier	Division	Place	Copa del Rey
2026–27	6	1ª Ext.		

- 2 seasons in Tercera División
