= CD Diocesano =

Association football team in Spain

Diocesano
- Full name: Club Deportivo Diocesano
- Nickname: Dioce
- Founded: 1965
- Ground: Campo de la Federación, Cáceres, Extremadura, Spain
- Capacity: 4,000
- Chairman: Gerardo Hierro
- Manager: Adolfo Senso
- League: Primera Extremeña – Group 1
- 2025–26: Tercera Federación – Group 14, 16th of 18 (relegated)
Home colours	Away colours

Club Deportivo Diocesano is a football team based in Cáceres, in the autonomous community of Extremadura. Founded in 1965, it plays in Primera Extremeña – Group 1, holding home matches at the Campo de la Federación, with a capacity of 4,000 people.

== History ==
Founded in 1965 by Obispo D. Manuel Llopis, as a sporting section of the Colegio Diocesano de Cáceres, the club later started to sign players who were not inscribed in the school. Initially focused in youth football, the club played four seasons as a senior between 1992 and 1996 before returning to youth football.

In 2011, Diocesano merged with ACD Ciudad de Cáceres, taking their seat in the Regional Preferente. In 2017, the club achieved promotion to Tercera División for the first time ever.

== Season to season ==
Season	Tier	Division	Place	Copa del Rey
1992–93	6	1ª Reg.	4th	
1993–94	6	1ª Reg.	1st	
1994–95	5	Reg. Pref.	6th	
1995–96	5	Reg. Pref.	5th	
1996–2011	DNP			
2011–12	5	Reg. Pref.	7th	
2012–13	5	Reg. Pref.	2nd	
2013–14	5	Reg. Pref.	8th	
2014–15	5	Reg. Pref.	4th	
2015–16	5	Reg. Pref.	3rd	
2016–17	5	1ª Ext.	3rd	
2017–18	4	3ª	7th	
2018–19	4	3ª	9th	
2019–20	4	3ª	10th	
2020–21	4	3ª	2nd / 5th	
2021–22	5	3ª RFEF	1st	
2022–23	4	2ª Fed.	16th	
2023–24	5	3ª Fed.	7th	
2024–25	5	3ª Fed.	6th	
2025–26	5	3ª Fed.		

- 1 season in Segunda Federación
- 4 seasons in Tercera División
- 4 seasons in Tercera Federación/Tercera División RFEF

== Notable players ==
- (Spain) Manolo
