= ACD Ciudad de Cáceres =

Ciudad de Cáceres
- Full name: Agrupación Cultural y Deportiva Ciudad de Cáceres
- Founded: 2005
- Dissolved: 2011
- Ground: Pinilla, Cáceres, Extremadura, Spain
- Capacity: 1,000
- 2010–11: Regional Preferente, 18th
Home colours	Away colours

Agrupación Cultural y Deportiva Ciudad de Cáceres was a Spanish football team based in Cáceres, in the autonomous community of Extremadura. Founded in 2005, they hosted their home games at Campo de Fútbol Pinilla.

Before 2011–12 season, Ciudad de Cáceres merged with CD Diocesano, being latter the seat's owner in Regional Preferente.

== Season to season ==
Season	Tier	Division	Place	Copa del Rey
2005–06	6	1ª Reg.	7th	
2006–07	6	1ª Reg.	1st	
2007–08	5	Reg. Pref.	3rd	
2008–09	5	Reg. Pref.	4th	
2009–10	5	Reg. Pref.	5th	
2010–11	5	Reg. Pref.	18th	
