= CA Pueblonuevo =

Association football team in Spain

Atlético Pueblonuevo
- Full name: Club Atlético Pueblonuevo
- Founded: 1969
- Ground: Antonio Amaya, Pueblonuevo del Guadiana, Extremadura, Spain
- Capacity: 3,150
- President: José Maya Rey
- Manager: Valentín García
- League: Tercera Federación – Group 14
- 2025–26: Tercera Federación – Group 14, 15th of 18
- Website: https://www.atleticopueblonuevo.es/
Home colours	Away colours

Club Atlético Pueblonuevo is a football team based in Pueblonuevo del Guadiana, in the autonomous community of Extremadura. Founded in 1969, it plays in Tercera Federación – Group 14, holding home matches at the Estadio Antonio Amaya, with a capacity of 3,150 people.

== Season to season ==
Season	Tier	Division	Place	Copa del Rey
1969–70	5	2ª Reg.	3rd	
1970–71	5	2ª Reg. P.	5th	
1971–72	5	2ª Reg. P.	4th	
1972–73	5	2ª Reg.	1st	
1973–74	4	1ª Reg.	13th	
1974–75	4	Reg. Pref.	6th	
1975–76	4	Reg. Pref.	18th	
1976–77	5	1ª Reg.	5th	
1977–78	6	1ª Reg.	1st	
1978–79	5	Reg. Pref.	9th	
1979–80	5	Reg. Pref.	14th	
1980–81	5	Reg. Pref.	5th	
1981–82	5	Reg. Pref.	14th	
1982–83	5	Reg. Pref.	17th	
1983–84	5	Reg. Pref.	18th	
1984–85	6	1ª Reg.	3rd	
1985–86	6	1ª Reg.	1st	
1986–87	5	Reg. Pref.	3rd	
1987–88	4	3ª	17th	
1988–89	4	3ª	16th	

Season	Tier	Division	Place	Copa del Rey
1989–90	4	3ª	18th	
1990–91	5	Reg. Pref.	6th	
1991–92	5	Reg. Pref.	11th	
1992–93	5	Reg. Pref.	8th	
1993–94	5	Reg. Pref.	4th	
1994–95	5	Reg. Pref.	8th	
1995–96	5	Reg. Pref.	18th	
1996–97	6	1ª Reg.	1st	
1997–98	5	Reg. Pref.	3rd	
1998–99	5	Reg. Pref.	8th	
1999–2000	5	Reg. Pref.	11th	
2000–01	5	Reg. Pref.	4th	
2001–02	5	Reg. Pref.	4th	
2002–03	5	Reg. Pref.	4th	
2003–04	5	Reg. Pref.	5th	
2004–05	5	Reg. Pref.	5th	
2005–06	5	Reg. Pref.	3rd	
2006–07	5	Reg. Pref.	1st	
2007–08	4	3ª	18th	
2008–09	5	Reg. Pref.	14th	

Season	Tier	Division	Place	Copa del Rey
2009–10	5	Reg. Pref.	10th	
2010–11	5	Reg. Pref.	1st	
2011–12	4	3ª	15th	
2012–13	4	3ª	12th	
2013–14	4	3ª	9th	
2014–15	4	3ª	9th	
2015–16	4	3ª	8th	
2016–17	4	3ª	17th	
2017–18	4	3ª	16th	
2018–19	4	3ª	18th	
2019–20	5	1ª Ext.	1st	
2020–21	5	1ª Ext.	3rd	
2021–22	6	1ª Ext.	1st	
2022–23	5	3ª Fed.	11th	
2023–24	5	3ª Fed.	9th	
2024–25	5	3ª Fed.	12th	
2025–26	5	3ª Fed.	15th	
2026–27	5	3ª Fed.		

- 12 seasons in Tercera División
- 5 seasons in Tercera Federación
