= AD Llerenense =

Association football team in Spain

Llerenense
- Full name: Agrupación Deportiva Llerenense
- Founded: 1967
- Ground: Fernando Robina, Llerena, Extremadura, Spain
- Capacity: 1,000
- President: Rafael Candalija
- Head coach: Luismi Álvarez
- League: Tercera Federación – Group 14
- 2025–26: Tercera Federación – Group 14, 11th of 18
Home colours	Away colours

Agrupación Deportiva Llerenense is a football team based in Llerena, in the autonomous community of Extremadura. Founded in 1967, it plays in Tercera Federación – Group 14, holding home matches at the Estadio Fernando Robina, with a capacity of 1,000 people.

== Season to season ==
Season	Tier	Division	Place	Copa del Rey
1967–68	4	1ª Reg.	1st	
1968–69	4	1ª Reg.	4th	
1969–70	4	1ª Reg.	1st	
1970–71	3	3ª	20th	
1971–72	4	1ª Reg.	3rd	
1972–73	4	1ª Reg.	2nd	
1973–74	4	1ª Reg.	4th	
1974–75	4	Reg. Pref.	8th	
1975–76	4	Reg. Pref.	13th	
1976–77	4	Reg. Pref.	17th	
1977–78	5	Reg. Pref.	5th	
1978–79	5	Reg. Pref.	2nd	
1979–80	3	3ª	14th	
1980–81	3	3ª	18th	
1981–82	5	Reg. Pref.	6th	
1982–83	5	Reg. Pref.	10th	
1983–84	3	3ª	20th	
1984–85	5	Reg. Pref.	15th	
1985–86	5	Reg. Pref.	20th	
1986–87	6	1ª Reg.	8th	

Season	Tier	Division	Place	Copa del Rey
1987–88	6	1ª Reg.	7th	
1988–89	6	1ª Reg.	1st	
1989–90	5	Reg. Pref.	1st	
1990–91	4	3ª	15th	
1991–92	4	3ª	8th	
1992–93	4	3ª	12th	
1993–94	4	3ª	10th	
1994–95	4	3ª	19th	
1995–96	5	Reg. Pref.	7th	
1996–97	5	Reg. Pref.	5th	
1997–98	5	Reg. Pref.	6th	
1998–99	5	Reg. Pref.	4th	
1999–2000	5	Reg. Pref.	10th	
2000–01	5	Reg. Pref.	13th	
2001–02	5	Reg. Pref.	9th	
2002–03	5	Reg. Pref.	12th	
2003–04	5	Reg. Pref.	13th	
2004–05	5	Reg. Pref.	13th	
2005–06	5	Reg. Pref.	16th	
2006–07	5	Reg. Pref.	11th	

Season	Tier	Division	Place	Copa del Rey
2007–08	5	Reg. Pref.	18th	
2008–09	6	1ª Reg.	3rd	
2009–10	6	1ª Reg.	8th	
2010–11	6	1ª Reg.	1st	
2011–12	5	Reg. Pref.	3rd	
2012–13	5	Reg. Pref.	6th	
2013–14	5	Reg. Pref.	3rd	
2014–15	5	Reg. Pref.	6th	
2015–16	5	Reg. Pref.	10th	
2016–17	5	1ª Ext.	12th	
2017–18	5	1ª Ext.	1st	
2018–19	4	3ª	11th	
2019–20	4	3ª	18th	
2020–21	4	3ª	7th / 4th	
2021–22	5	3ª RFEF	3rd	
2022–23	5	3ª Fed.	1st	
2023–24	4	2ª Fed.	14th	First round
2024–25	5	3ª Fed.	4th	
2025–26	5	3ª Fed.	11th	
2026–27	5	3ª Fed.		

- 1 season in Segunda Federación
- 12 seasons in Tercera División
- 5 seasons in Tercera Federación/Tercera División RFEF
