= CP Valdivia =

Spanish association football club

Valdivia
- Full name: Club Polideportivo Valdivia
- Founded: 1956
- Ground: Primero de Mayo, Valdivia, Extremadura, Spain
- Capacity: 700 sitting
- Chairman: (Spain) Francisco Escobar
- Manager: (Spain) Ricardo Tapia
- League: Primera Extremeña – Group 3
- 2024–25: Segunda Extremeña – Group 2, 1st of 14 (champions)
Home colours	Away colours

Club Polideportivo Valdivia is a football team based in Valdivia, Villanueva de la Serena in the autonomous community of Extremadura. Founded in 1956, it plays in Primera Extremeña – Group 3.

== History ==
In the 2018-19 season the club finished 13th, just 6 points away from being relegated from the Tercera División.

== Season to season ==
Season	Tier	Division	Place	Copa del Rey
1965–66	4	1ª Reg.	3rd	
1966–67	4	1ª Reg.	2nd	
1967–68	DNP			
1968–69	4	1ª Reg.	9th	
1969–1978	DNP			
1978–79	6	1ª Reg.	7th	
1979–80	6	1ª Reg.	12th	
1980–81	6	1ª Reg.	15th	
1981–82	6	1ª Reg.	10th	
1982–83	6	1ª Reg.	11th	
1983–84	6	1ª Reg.	7th	
1984–85	6	1ª Reg.	9th	
1985–86	6	1ª Reg.	18th	
1986–87	6	1ª Reg.	9th	
1987–88	6	1ª Reg.	3rd	
1988–89	6	1ª Reg.	3rd	
1989–90	5	Reg. Pref.	5th	
1990–91	5	Reg. Pref.	7th	
1991–92	5	Reg. Pref.	16th	
1992–93	5	Reg. Pref.	13th	

Season	Tier	Division	Place	Copa del Rey
1993–94	5	Reg. Pref.	5th	
1994–95	DNP			
1995–96	6	1ª Reg.	7th	
1996–2003	DNP			
2003–04	6	1ª Reg.	1st	
2004–05	5	Reg. Pref.	1st	
2005–06	4	3ª	21st	
2006–07	5	Reg. Pref.	1st	
2007–08	4	3ª	14th	
2008–09	4	3ª	20th	
2009–10	5	Reg. Pref.	6th	
2010–11	5	Reg. Pref.	6th	
2011–12	5	Reg. Pref.	2nd	
2012–13	5	Reg. Pref.	1st	
2013–14	4	Reg. Pref.	1st	
2014–15	4	3ª	15th	
2015–16	4	3ª	14th	
2016–17	4	3ª	14th	
2017–18	4	3ª	15th	
2018–19	4	3ª	13th	

Season	Tier	Division	Place	Copa del Rey
2019–20	4	3ª	20th	
2020–21	4	3ª	10th / 10th	
2021–22	6	1ª Ext.	12th	
2022–23	DNP			
2023–24	7	2ª Ext.	1st	
2024–25	7	2ª Ext.	1st	
2025–26	6	1ª Ext.		

- 9 seasons in Tercera División
