= 1977–78 Copa del Rey =

76th Copa del Rey

Tournament details
- Country: Spain
- Teams: 174

Final positions
- Champions: FC Barcelona (18th title)
- Runners-up: Las Palmas

Tournament statistics
- Matches played: 343

The 1977–78 Copa del Rey was the 76th staging of the Spanish Cup. The competition began on 14 September 1977 and concluded on 19 April 1978 with the final.

== First round ==
Team 1	Agg.	Team 2	1st leg	2nd leg
Montijo	1–9	Rayo Vallecano	1–4	0–5
Getxo	2–3	Sevilla	2–0	0–3
Atlético Baleares	2–1	Salamanca	1–1	1–0
Pegaso	2–4	Cádiz	2–2	0–2
Montcada	2–3	Algeciras	1–0	1–3
Valdepeñas	0–10	Real Madrid	0–7	0–3
Vinaròs	4–7	Sporting Gijón	3–2	1–5
Orense	0–3	Racing Santander	0–2	0–1
Hércules	7–2	Alcira	6–0	1–2
CD Gijón	1–7	Elche	0–2	1–5
Villarreal	0–3	RCD Español	0–1	0–2
Albacete	0–3	Burgos	0–1	0–2
Real Sociedad	5–2	Acero	5–1	0–1
Getafe	4–0	Crevillente	2–0	2–0
Castilla	1–0	Mallorca	1–0	0–0
Leganés	6–2	Vélez	4–0	2–2
Carabanchel	4–2	Jerez	3–1	1–1
Poblense	0–2	Ciempozuelos	0–1	0–1
Gandía	0–4	Guadalajara	0–1	0–3
Alcorcón	1–5	Calvo Sotelo	0–0	1–5
Barcelona Atlètic	3–4	Granada	2–1	1–3
Alcalá	2–0	Baracaldo	2–0	0–0
Toledo	3–3 (5–3 p)	Arganda	3–1	0–2
Masnou	5–6	Torrejón	5–2	0–4
Logroñés	1–5	Castellón	1–3	0–2
Sestao	0–1	Tenerife	0–0	0–1
Pontevedra	3–5	Oviedo	1–3	2–2
Olímpic Xàtiva	1–2	Real Murcia	0–1	1–1
Alavés	4–1	Andorra	2–0	2–1
Valladolid	3–1	Palencia	2–0	1–1
Zaragoza	7–3	Las Palmas Atlético	3–0	4–3
Osasuna	3–0	Extremadura	3–0	0–0
Jaén	6–3	Úbeda CF	3–1	3–2
Málaga	5–1	Sporting Mahonés	2–0	3–1
Sabadell	3–0	Gran Peña	2–0	1–0
Bilbao Athletic	5–0	Venta Baños	4–0	1–0
Racing Ferrol	4–2	Villena	3–1	1–1
Eldense	6–4	Don Benito	5–1	1–3
Gimnástica Arandina	2–5	Real Unión	2–1	0–4
Onteniente	5–0	Caudal	4–0	1–0
Sevilla Atlético	5–3	Paterna	2–2	3–1
Noya	1–3	Huesca	1–0	0–3
Balmaseda	1–10	Levante	1–3	0–7
Ceuta	4–3	Calahorra	3–0	1–3
Gavà		Atlético Ceuta	–	–
Portuense	0–3	Tudelano	0–1	0–2
Xerez	5–2	Constancia	4–1	1–1
Langreo	4–0	Melilla	3–0	1–0
Santoña	2–5	Lérida	1–1	1–4
Linares	7–3	Manchego	5–1	2–2
Basconia	1–3	Sant Andreu	1–0	0–3
Almería	2–3	San Fernando	2–1	0–2
Portmany	1–4	Girona	1–0	0–4
Cultural Leonesa	4–2	Avilés	2–1	2–1
Badajoz	3–1	Gijón Industrial	3–0	0–1
Ponferradina	4–6	Alcoyano	2–0	2–6
Plasencia	3–2	Naval	3–0	0–2
Reus	2–0	Puerto Real	1–0	1–0
Salmantino	2–3	Rayo Cantabria	1–0	1–3
Lugo	2–3	Gimnástica Torrelavega	2–1	0–2
Porreres	4–5	UD Español	2–1	2–4
Estepona	1–2	Arosa	1–0	0–2
Fabril	2–1	Cacereño	1–0	1–1
Mestalla	2–0	Yeclano	2–0	0–0
Mérida	1–2	Nàstic Tarragona	0–0	1–2
Motril	1–3	Almansa	1–1	0–2
Huesca B	1–4	Peña Sport	1–3	0–1
Terrassa	5–6	Mirandés	4–0	1–6
La Cava	4–1	Díter Zafra	2–0	2–1
Figueras	11–4	Arenas Guecho	7–2	4–2
Malgrat	1–1 (4–3 p)	Celanova	0–0	1–1
Orihuela	3–1	Vic	2–1	1–0
Europa	4–2	Badalona	2–1	2–1
Cartagena	3–2	Gernika	2–0	1–2
Júpiter	5–6	Moscardó	3–2	2–4
Margaritense	0–6	Marbella	0–0	0–6
Linense	1–0	Ibiza	1–0	0–0
Hospitalet	3–3 (3–5 p)	Sariñena	2–0	1–3
Compostela	1–4	Córdoba	0–1	1–3
Burgos Promesas	0–10	Valencia	0–3	0–7
Toscal	3–4	Recreativo de Huelva	3–1	0–3
Monzón	1–3	Celta	1–0	0–3
Talavera	1–0	Zamora	1–0	0–0
Deportivo de La Coruña	3–2	Ensidesa	1–0	2–2

- Bye: Valladolid Promesas.

== Second round ==
Team 1	Agg.	Team 2	1st leg	2nd leg
Valladolid Promesas	1–3	Elche	0–2	1–1
Peña Sport	0–4	Valladolid	0–2	0–2
Algeciras	2–10	Real Madrid	0–6	2–4
Castilla	5–5 (3–4 p)	Sabadell	4–3	1–2
Leganés	1–5	Eldense	1–2	0–3
Ciempozuelos	3–2	UE Lleida	2–1	1–1
Alcalá	1–10	Valencia	1–3	0–7
Burgos	4–1	Huesca	2–0	2–1
Ceuta	1–6	RCD Español	1–1	0–5
Atlético Baleares	2–3	Cádiz	1–0	1–3
Tudelano	3–6	Sporting Gijón	2–1	1–5
Figueres	3–4	Racing Santander	1–2	2–2
Carabanchel	5–2	Calvo Sotelo	4–1	1–1
Almansa	1–4	Rayo Vallecano	0–2	1–2
Osasuna	4–1	Guadalajara	2–0	2–1
Deportivo de La Coruña	5–1	Plasencia	3–0	2–1
Europa	3–8	Málaga	3–3	0–5
Jaén	1–4	Real Unión	1–1	0–3
Onteniente	1–0	Torrejón	1–0	0–0
Girona	5–1	Alcoyano	3–0	2–1
Valencia Mestalla	4–2	Sevilla Atlético	3–0	1–2
UD Español	0–1	Mirandés	0–0	0–1
Toledo	3–3 (4–3 p)	Badajoz	2–0	1–3
Talavera	2–0	Arosa	2–0	0–0
Sariñena	1–5	Rayo Cantabria	0–2	1–3
San Fernando	5–1	Gimnàstic de Tarragona	4–1	1–0
Sevilla	4–1	Sant Andreu	2–0	2–1
Orihuela	0–3	Alavés	0–1	0–2
Oviedo	4–1	Cultural Leonesa	2–0	2–1
Langreo	1–3	Granada	1–0	0–3
Racing Ferrol	3–5	Real Murcia	2–0	1–5
Levante	9–2	Moscardó	5–0	4–2
Real Sociedad	3–3 (8–7 p)	Xerez	1–1	2–2
Marbella	4–3	Gimnástica Torrelavega	4–1	0–2
Córdoba	3–1	Bilbao Athletic	1–0	2–1
Recreativo de Huelva	4–2	Linense	2–0	2–2
Reus	0–5	Zaragoza	0–0	0–5
Celta	2–1	Cartagena	2–0	0–1
Tenerife	2–1	Malgrat	2–0	0–1
La Cava	2–5	Linares	1–3	1–2
Gavà	2–3	Castellón	1–1	1–2
Fabril	0–7	Hércules	0–3	0–4

- Bye: Getafe

== Third round ==
Team 1	Agg.	Team 2	1st leg	2nd leg
Burgos	9–3	Talavera	6–0	3–3
Castellón	3–6	Valencia Mestalla	2–1	1–5
Celta	2–3	Alavés	2–2	0–1
Ciempozuelos	1–2	Sabadell	1–2	0–0
Córdoba	8–1	Rayo Cantabria	4–0	4–1
Deportivo de La Coruña	1–1 (3–5 p)	Espanyol	1–1	0–0
Eldense	2–3	Tenerife	1–0	1–3
Getafe	2–1	Carabanchel	1–1	1–0
Sporting Gijón	5–2	Valladolid	4–1	1–1
Hércules	9–2	Girona	8–0	1–2
Levante	2–3	Real Murcia	1–0	1–3
Linares	1–4	Cádiz	1–2	0–2
Marbella	1–6	Zaragoza	1–2	0–4
Málaga	2–5	Las Palmas	1–1	1–4
Osasuna	0–1	San Fernando	0–0	0–1
Ontinyent	1–8	Oviedo	0–1	1–7
Rayo Vallecano	1–3	Recreativo de Huelva	0–0	1–3
Racing Santander	0–5	Real Madrid	0–0	0–5
Sevilla	3–1	Elche	1–0	2–1
Toledo	1–9	Real Sociedad	1–3	0–6
Real Unión	2–5	Granada	1–0	1–5
Valencia	6–2	Mirandés	2–0	4–2

== Fourth round ==
Team 1	Agg.	Team 2	1st leg	2nd leg
Alavés	3–2	Oviedo	2–0	1–2
Cádiz	2–0	Córdoba	2–0	0–0
Getafe	4–4 (6–5 p)	Sabadell	3–1	1–3
Sporting Gijón	2–1	Hércules	1–0	1–1
Granada	1–2	Sevilla	1–2	0–0
Recreativo de Huelva	3–4	Burgos	3–2	0–2
Las Palmas	1–0	RCD Español	1–0	0–0
Valencia Mestalla	3–4	Tenerife	1–2	2–2
Real Murcia	3–4	Zaragoza	2–0	1–4
San Fernando	2–4	Valencia	1–0	1–4

- Bye: Real Madrid and Real Sociedad.

== Round of 16 ==
Team 1	Agg.	Team 2	1st leg	2nd leg
Alavés	3–2	Zaragoza	2–0	1–2
Atlético Madrid	5–5 (5–4 p)	Athletic Bilbao	1–2	4–3
Burgos	5–7	Real Betis	3–2	2–5
Cádiz	1–3	Las Palmas	1–0	0–3
Getafe	3–11	FC Barcelona	3–3	0–8
Real Sociedad	3–2	Real Madrid	2–0	1–2
Sevilla	1–4	Sporting Gijón	0–1	1–3
Valencia	3–0	Tenerife	3–0	0–0

== Quarter-finals ==
Team 1	Agg.	Team 2	1st leg	2nd leg
Alavés	1–2	FC Barcelona	1–0	0–2
Atlético Madrid	3–4	Las Palmas	3–2	0–2
Real Betis	3–4	Sporting Gijón	3–1	0–3
Valencia	2–5	Real Sociedad	1–1	1–4

== Semi-finals ==
Team 1	Agg.	Team 2	1st leg	2nd leg
Las Palmas	5–3	Sporting Gijón	3–0	2–3
Real Sociedad	1–2	FC Barcelona	0–0	1–2

== Final ==
Team 1	Score	Team 2
FC Barcelona	3–1	Las Palmas

Copa del Rey
winners
FC Barcelona
18th title
