= CF Jaraíz =

Association football team in Spain

Jaraíz
- Full name: Club de Fútbol Jaraíz
- Nickname: Pimentoneros
- Founded: 1972
- Ground: Municipal, Jaraíz de la Vera, Extremadura, Spain
- Capacity: 2,000
- Chairman: Ana Isabel Paniagua Méndez
- Manager: Dani Baños
- League: Tercera Federación – Group 14
- 2025–26: Tercera Federación – Group 14, 5th of 18
Home colours	Away colours

Club de Fútbol Jaraíz is a football team based in Jaraíz de la Vera, in the autonomous community of Extremadura. Founded in 1972, they play in Tercera Federación – Group 14, holding home matches at the Polideportivo Municipal Jaraíz de la Vera, with a capacity of 2,000 people.

== Season to season ==
Season	Tier	Division	Place	Copa del Rey
1972–73	6	3ª Reg.	4th	
1973–74	5	2ª Reg.	2nd	
1974–75	4	Reg. Pref.	20th	
1975–76	5	1ª Reg.	8th	
1976–77	5	1ª Reg.	2nd	
1977–78	6	1ª Reg.	2nd	
1978–79	5	Reg. Pref.	14th	
1979–80	5	Reg. Pref.	15th	
1980–81	5	Reg. Pref.	7th	
1981–82	5	Reg. Pref.	8th	
1982–83	5	Reg. Pref.	15th	
1983–84	5	Reg. Pref.	14th	
1984–85	5	Reg. Pref.	7th	
1985–86	5	Reg. Pref.	16th	
1986–87	6	1ª Reg.	4th	
1987–88	6	1ª Reg.	22nd	
1988–89	6	1ª Reg.	13th	
1989–90	5	Reg. Pref.	12th	
1990–91	5	Reg. Pref.	13th	
1991–92	5	Reg. Pref.	17th	

Season	Tier	Division	Place	Copa del Rey
1992–93	6	1ª Reg.	4th	
1993–94	6	1ª Reg.	2nd	
1994–95	5	Reg. Pref.	8th	
1995–96	5	Reg. Pref.	16th	
1996–97	6	1ª Reg.	1st	
1997–98	6	1ª Reg.	2nd	
1998–99	5	Reg. Pref.	5th	
1999–2000	5	Reg. Pref.	8th	
2000–01	DNP			
2001–02	DNP			
2002–03	DNP			
2003–04	6	1ª Reg.	1st	
2004–05	5	Reg. Pref.	10th	
2005–06	5	Reg. Pref.	13th	
2006–07	5	Reg. Pref.	20th	
2007–08	6	1ª Reg.	10th	
2008–09	6	1ª Reg.	7th	
2009–10	6	1ª Reg.	7th	
2010–11	6	1ª Reg.	6th	
2011–12	6	1ª Reg.	2nd	

Season	Tier	Division	Place	Copa del Rey
2012–13	5	Reg. Pref.	15th	
2013–14	6	1ª Reg.	7th	
2014–15	6	1ª Reg.	1st	
2015–16	5	Reg. Pref.	14th	
2016–17	5	1ª Ext.	14th	
2017–18	6	2ª Ext.	3rd	
2018–19	6	2ª Ext.	2nd	
2019–20	5	1ª Ext.	11th	
2020–21	5	1ª Ext.	1st	
2021–22	6	1ª Ext.	3rd	Preliminary
2022–23	6	1ª Ext.	1st	
2023–24	5	3ª Fed.	8th	
2024–25	5	3ª Fed.	3rd	
2025–26	5	3ª Fed.	5th	
2026–27	5	3ª Fed.		

- 4 seasons in Tercera Federación
