= SP Villafranca =

Association football team in Spain

Villafranca
- Full name: Sociedad Polideportiva Villafranca
- Nickname: Amarillos
- Founded: 1949
- Ground: Municipal, Villafranca de los Barros, Extremadura, Spain
- Capacity: 5,500
- Chairman: Cipri Santos
- Manager: José Antonio Ruiz
- League: Tercera Federación – Group 14
- 2025–26: Tercera Federación – Group 14, 7th of 18
Home colours	Away colours

Sociedad Polideportiva Villafranca is a football team based in Villafranca de los Barros, in the autonomous community of Extremadura. Founded in 1949, it plays in Tercera Federación – Group 14, holding home matches at the Polideportivo Municipal de Villafranca de los Barros, with a capacity of 5,500 people.

== History ==
Founded in 1949, Villafranca first reached the Tercera División in 1983. Relegated in 1986, the club spent two seasons in the Regional Preferente before returning to the fourth tier in 1988, and went on to spend 20 consecutive seasons in the category.

== Season to season ==
Season	Tier	Division	Place	Copa del Rey
1950–51	4	1ª Reg.	8th	
1951–52	4	1ª Reg.	2nd	
1952–53	5	2ª Reg.		
1953–54	5	2ª Reg.		
1954–55	5	2ª Reg.		
1955–56	5	2ª Reg.		
1956–57	5	2ª Reg.		
1957–58	4	1ª Reg.	5th	
1958–59	4	1ª Reg.	3rd	
1959–60	4	1ª Reg.	6th	
1960–61	4	1ª Reg.	8th	
1961–62	4	1ª Reg.	11th	
1962–63	5	2ª Reg.		
1963–64	5	2ª Reg.		
1964–65	5	2ª Reg.		
1965–66	5	2ª Reg.		
1966–67	5	2ª Reg.		
1967–68	5	2ª Reg.		
1968–69	5	2ª Reg.	1st	
1969–70	4	1ª Reg.	13th	

Season	Tier	Division	Place	Copa del Rey
1970–71	5	2ª Reg.	5th	
1971–72	5	2ª Reg.	10th	
1972–73	5	2ª Reg.	5th	
1973–74	5	2ª Reg.	7th	
1974–75	5	1ª Reg.	4th	
1975–76	5	1ª Reg.	1st	
1976–77	4	Reg. Pref.	15th	
1977–78	5	Reg. Pref.	8th	
1978–79	5	Reg. Pref.	12th	
1979–80	5	Reg. Pref.	6th	
1980–81	5	Reg. Pref.	4th	
1981–82	5	Reg. Pref.	17th	
1982–83	5	Reg. Pref.	12th	
1983–84	4	3ª	10th	
1984–85	4	3ª	13th	
1985–86	4	3ª	18th	
1986–87	5	Reg. Pref.	6th	
1987–88	5	Reg. Pref.	4th	
1988–89	4	3ª	7th	
1989–90	4	3ª	14th	

Season	Tier	Division	Place	Copa del Rey
1990–91	4	3ª	11th	
1991–92	4	3ª	14th	
1992–93	4	3ª	16th	
1993–94	4	3ª	11th	
1994–95	4	3ª	7th	
1995–96	4	3ª	6th	
1996–97	4	3ª	9th	
1997–98	4	3ª	3rd	
1998–99	4	3ª	2nd	
1999–2000	4	3ª	10th	
2000–01	4	3ª	13th	
2001–02	4	3ª	7th	
2002–03	4	3ª	8th	
2003–04	4	3ª	13th	
2004–05	4	3ª	12th	
2005–06	4	3ª	15th	
2006–07	4	3ª	10th	
2007–08	4	3ª	20th	
2008–09	5	Reg. Pref.	2nd	
2009–10	4	3ª	20th	

Season	Tier	Division	Place	Copa del Rey
2010–11	5	Reg. Pref.	2nd	
2011–12	4	3ª	19th	
2012–13	5	Reg. Pref.	7th	
2013–14	5	Reg. Pref.	6th	
2014–15	5	Reg. Pref.	2nd	
2015–16	5	Reg. Pref.	11th	
2016–17	5	1ª Ext.	8th	
2017–18	5	1ª Ext.	2nd	
2018–19	5	1ª Ext.	5th	
2019–20	5	1ª Ext.	2nd	
2020–21	5	1ª Ext.	2nd	
2021–22	5	3ª RFEF	10th	
2022–23	5	3ª Fed.	8th	
2023–24	5	3ª Fed.	4th	
2024–25	5	3ª Fed.	9th	
2025–26	5	3ª Fed.	7th	
2026–27	5	3ª Fed.		

- 25 seasons in Tercera División
- 6 seasons in Tercera Federación/Tercera División RFEF
