= CD Castuera =

Association football team in Spain

Castuera
- Full name: Club Deportivo Castuera Subastacar
- Nicknames: Turroneros, Indios del Zújar
- Founded: 1969
- Ground: Municipal Manuel Ruiz, Castuera, Extremadura, Spain
- Capacity: 1,500
- Chairman: Antonio Holguín
- Manager: Alberto Fernández
- League: Tercera Federación – Group 14
- 2025–26: Primera Extremeña – Group 3, 2nd of 14 (promoted via play-offs)
Home colours	Away colours

Club Deportivo Castuera Subastacar is a football team based in Castuera, in the autonomous community of Extremadura. Founded in 1969, they play in Tercera Federación – Group 14, holding home matches at the Campo Municipal de Fútbol Manuel Ruiz, with a capacity of 1,500 people.

== Season to season ==
Season	Tier	Division	Place	Copa del Rey
1969–70	5	2ª Reg.	2nd	
1970–71	5	2ª Reg. P.	5th	
1971–72	5	2ª Reg. P.	4th	
1972–73	5	2ª Reg.	3rd	
1973–74	5	2ª Reg.	5th	
1974–75	4	Reg. Pref.	11th	
1975–76	4	Reg. Pref.	19th	
1976–77	5	1ª Reg.	7th	
1977–78	6	1ª Reg.	8th	
1978–79	6	1ª Reg.	8th	
1979–80	6	1ª Reg.	14th	
1980–81	6	1ª Reg.	8th	
1981–82	6	1ª Reg.	4th	
1982–83	6	1ª Reg.	2nd	
1983–84	5	Reg. Pref.	4th	
1984–85	5	Reg. Pref.	2nd	
1985–86	4	3ª	19th	
1986–87	5	Reg. Pref.	9th	
1987–88	5	Reg. Pref.	12th	
1988–89	5	Reg. Pref.	1st	

Season	Tier	Division	Place	Copa del Rey
1989–90	4	3ª	13th	
1990–91	4	3ª	12th	
1991–92	4	3ª	12th	
1992–93	4	3ª	7th	
1993–94	4	3ª	9th	
1994–95	4	3ª	10th	
1995–96	4	3ª	16th	
1996–97	4	3ª	15th	
1997–98	4	3ª	14th	
1998–99	4	3ª	17th	
1999–2000	5	Reg. Pref.	2nd	
2000–01	4	3ª	20th	
2001–02	5	Reg. Pref.	9th	
2002–03	5	Reg. Pref.	10th	
2003–04	5	Reg. Pref.	18th	
2004–05	6	1ª Reg.	3rd	
2005–06	5	Reg. Pref.	1st	
2006–07	4	3ª	18th	
2007–08	5	Reg. Pref.	8th	
2008–09	5	Reg. Pref.	6th	

Season	Tier	Division	Place	Copa del Rey
2009–10	5	Reg. Pref.	4th	
2010–11	5	Reg. Pref.	4th	
2011–12	5	Reg. Pref.	4th	
2012–13	5	Reg. Pref.	3rd	
2013–14	4	3ª	16th	
2014–15	4	3ª	18th	
2015–16	5	Reg. Pref.	2nd	
2016–17	5	1ª Ext.	1st	
2017–18	4	3ª	12th	
2018–19	4	3ª	19th	
2019–20	5	1ª Ext.	8th	
2020–21	5	1ª Ext.	5th	
2021–22	6	1ª Ext.	6th	
2022–23	6	1ª Ext.	2nd	
2023–24	5	3ª Fed.	6th	
2024–25	5	3ª Fed.	15th	
2025–26	6	1ª Ext.	2nd	
2026–27	5	3ª Fed.		

- 17 seasons in Tercera División
- 3 seasons in Tercera Federación
