= AD Ciudad de Plasencia =

Spanish football club

Ciudad de Plasencia
- Full name: Agrupación Deportiva Ciudad de Plasencia
- Founded: 1998
- Ground: La Vinosilla, Plasencia, Extremadura, Spain
- Capacity: 2,500
- Chairman: (Spain) Francisco Paramio
- Manager: (Spain) Miguel Rubio
- League: Primera Extremeña – Group 1
- 2024–25: Primera Extremeña – Group 1, 1st of 12 (champions)
| Home colours | Away colours |

Ciudad de Plasencia Club de Fútbol is a football team based in Plasencia in the autonomous community of Extremadura. Founded in 1998, it plays in Primera Extremeña – Group 1.

== Season to season ==
| Season | Tier | Division | Place | Copa del Rey |
|---|---|---|---|---|
| 1998–99 | 6 | 1ª Reg. | 1st | |
| 1999–2000 | 5 | Reg. Pref. | 5th | |
| 2000–01 | 5 | Reg. Pref. | 4th | |
| 2001–02 | 5 | Reg. Pref. | 2nd | |
| 2002–03 | 4 | 3ª | 15th | |
| 2003–04 | 4 | 3ª | 20th | |
| 2004–05 | 5 | Reg. Pref. | 7th | |
| 2005–06 | 5 | Reg. Pref. | 4th | |
| 2006–07 | 5 | Reg. Pref. | 5th | |
| 2007–08 | 5 | Reg. Pref. | 1st | |
| 2008–09 | 4 | 3ª | 17th | |
| 2009–10 | 4 | 3ª | 7th | |
| 2010–11 | 4 | 3ª | 11th | |
| 2011–12 | 4 | 3ª | 11th | |
| 2012–13 | 4 | 3ª | 7th | |
| 2013–14 | 4 | 3ª | 21st | |
| 2014–15 | 5 | Reg. Pref. | 9th | |
| 2015–16 | 5 | Reg. Pref. | 4th | |
| 2016–17 | 5 | 1ª Ext. | 4th | |
| 2017–18 | 5 | 1ª Ext. | 9th | |

| Season | Tier | Division | Place | Copa del Rey |
|---|---|---|---|---|
| 2018–19 | 5 | 1ª Ext. | 16th | |
| 2019–20 | 6 | 2ª Ext. | 3rd | |
| 2020–21 | 5 | 1ª Ext. | 7th | |
| 2021–22 | 6 | 1ª Ext. | 9th | |
| 2022–23 | 6 | 1ª Ext. | 9th | |
| 2023–24 | 6 | 1ª Ext. | 3rd | |
| 2024–25 | 6 | 1ª Ext. | 1st | |
| 2025–26 | 6 | 1ª Ext. | | |

- 8 seasons in Tercera División
