= CP Malpartida =

Spanish football team

Malpartida
- Full name: Club Polideportivo Malpartida
- Founded: 1969
- Ground: Vicente del Bosque, Malpartida de Cáceres, Extremadura, Spain
- Capacity: 700 sitting)
- Chairman: (Spain) Antonio Nieves
- Manager: (Spain) Ignacio Lobo García
- League: Primera Extremeña – Group 1
- 2025–26: Primera Extremeña – Group 1, 6th of 14
Home colours	Away colours

Club Polideportivo Malpartida is a Spanish football team based in Malpartida de Cáceres, in the autonomous community of Extremadura. Founded in 1969, it plays in Primera Extremeña – Group 1, holding home games at Campo de Fútbol Vicente del Bosque.

In 2025, the club reached an agreement with CP Cacereño to act as their reserve team.

== Season to season ==
Season	Tier	Division	Place	Copa del Rey
1969–70	5	2ª Reg.	1st	
1970–71	6	2ª Reg.	2nd	
1971–72	5	2ª Reg.	1st	
1972–73	4	1ª Reg.	11th	
1973–74	4	1ª Reg.	8th	
1974–75	4	Reg. Pref.	17th	
1975–76	4	Reg. Pref.	12th	
1976–77	4	Reg. Pref.	16th	
1977–78	5	Reg. Pref.	17th	
1978–79	7	2ª Reg.	9th	
1979–80	7	2ª Reg.	6th	
1980–81	7	2ª Reg.	1st	
1981–82	7	2ª Reg.	6th	
1982–83	7	2ª Reg.	2nd	
1983–84	7	2ª Reg.	4th	
1984–85	6	1ª Reg.	1st	
1985–86	5	Reg. Pref.	10th	
1986–87	5	Reg. Pref.	7th	
1987–88	5	Reg. Pref.	2nd	
1988–89	4	3ª	15th	

Season	Tier	Division	Place	Copa del Rey
1989–90	4	3ª	20th	
1990–91	5	Reg. Pref.	5th	
1991–92	5	Reg. Pref.	1st	
1992–93	4	3ª	17th	
1993–94	4	3ª	17th	
1994–95	4	3ª	11th	
1995–96	6	1ª Reg.	5th	
1996–97	5	Reg. Pref.	14th	
1997–98	5	Reg. Pref.	9th	
1998–99	5	Reg. Pref.	18th	
1999–2000	6	1ª Reg.	1st	
2000–01	5	Reg. Pref.	14th	
2001–02	5	Reg. Pref.	11th	
2002–03	5	Reg. Pref.	5th	
2003–04	5	Reg. Pref.	10th	
2004–05	5	Reg. Pref.	9th	
2005–06	5	Reg. Pref.	15th	
2006–07	5	Reg. Pref.	11th	
2007–08	5	Reg. Pref.	14th	
2008–09	5	Reg. Pref.	16th	

Season	Tier	Division	Place	Copa del Rey
2009–10	5	Reg. Pref.	15th	
2010–11	5	Reg. Pref.	7th	
2011–12	5	Reg. Pref.	4th	
2012–13	5	Reg. Pref.	3rd	
2013–14	5	Reg. Pref.	3rd	
2014–15	5	Reg. Pref.	16th	
2015–16	6	1ª Reg.	4th	
2016–17	6	2ª Ext.	2nd	
2017–18	5	1ª Ext.	11th	
2018–19	5	1ª Ext.	8th	
2019–20	5	1ª Ext.	7th	
2020–21	5	1ª Ext.	6th	
2021–22	6	1ª Ext.	10th	
2022–23	6	1ª Ext.	7th	
2023–24	6	1ª Ext.	5th	
2024–25	6	1ª Ext.	8th	
2025–26	6	1ª Ext.	6th	N/A (Note: Reserve team of Cacereño.)
2026–27	6	1ª Ext.		N/A

- 5 seasons in Tercera División
