= CD Santa Marta =

Spanish football team

Santa Marta
- Full name: Club Deportivo Santa Marta
- Founded: 1970
- Ground: José María Fernández Amo, Santa Marta de Los Barros, Extremadura, Spain
- Capacity: 2,000
- League: Segunda Extremeña – Group 4
- 2024–25: Primera Extremeña – Group 4, 12th of 12 (relegated)
| Home colours | Away colours |

Club Deportivo Santa Marta is a football team based in Santa Marta de los Barros in the autonomous community of Extremadura. Founded in 1970, they play in Segunda Extremeña – Group 4.

Santa Marta resigned to play in July 2012, but returned to an active status two years later.

== Season to season ==
| Season | Tier | Division | Place | Copa del Rey |
|---|---|---|---|---|
| 1970–71 | 5 | 2ª Reg. | 10th | |
| 1971–72 | 5 | 2ª Reg. | 2nd | |
| 1972–73 | 5 | 2ª Reg. | 2nd | |
| 1973–74 | 5 | 2ª Reg. | 3rd | |
| 1974–75 | 5 | 1ª Reg. | 6th | |
| 1975–76 | 5 | 1ª Reg. | 9th | |
| 1976–77 | 5 | 1ª Reg. | 7th | |
| 1977–78 | 6 | 1ª Reg. | 5th | |
| 1978–79 | 6 | 1ª Reg. | 7th | |
| 1979–80 | 6 | 1ª Reg. | 17th | |
| 1980–81 | 6 | 1ª Reg. | 11th | |
| 1981–82 | 6 | 1ª Reg. | 5th | |
| 1982–83 | 6 | 1ª Reg. | 15th | |
| 1983–84 | 6 | 1ª Reg. | 2nd | |
| 1984–85 | 6 | 1ª Reg. | 6th | |
| 1985–86 | 6 | 1ª Reg. | 5th | |
| 1986–87 | 6 | 1ª Reg. | 2nd | |
| 1987–88 | 6 | 1ª Reg. | 3rd | |
| 1988–89 | 6 | 1ª Reg. | 4th | |
| 1989–90 | 5 | Reg. Pref. | 3rd | |

| Season | Tier | Division | Place | Copa del Rey |
|---|---|---|---|---|
| 1990–91 | 5 | Reg. Pref. | 7th | |
| 1991–92 | 5 | Reg. Pref. | 12th | |
| 1992–93 | 5 | Reg. Pref. | 6th | |
| 1993–94 | 5 | Reg. Pref. | 14th | |
| 1994–95 | 5 | Reg. Pref. | 19th | |
| 1995–96 | 6 | 1ª Reg. | 3rd | |
| 1996–97 | 5 | Reg. Pref. | 15th | |
| 1997–2001 | DNP | | | |
| 2001–02 | 6 | 1ª Reg. | 2nd | |
| 2002–03 | 5 | Reg. Pref. | 11th | |
| 2003–04 | 5 | Reg. Pref. | 9th | |
| 2004–05 | 5 | Reg. Pref. | 1st | |
| 2005–06 | 4 | 3ª | 20th | |
| 2006–07 | 5 | Reg. Pref. | 3rd | |
| 2007–08 | 5 | Reg. Pref. | 1st | |
| 2008–09 | 4 | 3ª | 16th | |
| 2009–10 | 4 | 3ª | 17th | |
| 2010–11 | 4 | 3ª | 18th | |
| 2011–12 | 5 | Reg. Pref. | 2nd | |
| 2012–13 | DNP | | | |

| Season | Tier | Division | Place | Copa del Rey |
|---|---|---|---|---|
| 2013–14 | DNP | | | |
| 2014–15 | 6 | 1ª Reg. | 4th | |
| 2015–16 | 6 | 1ª Reg. | 2nd | |
| 2016–17 | 5 | 1ª Ext. | 14th | |
| 2017–18 | 5 | 1ª Ext. | 11th | |
| 2018–19 | 5 | 1ª Ext. | 6th | |
| 2019–20 | 5 | 1ª Ext. | 11th | |
| 2020–21 | 5 | 1ª Ext. | 8th | |
| 2021–22 | 6 | 1ª Ext. | 9th | |
| 2022–23 | 6 | 1ª Ext. | 8th | |
| 2023–24 | 6 | 1ª Ext. | 4th | |
| 2024–25 | 6 | 1ª Ext. | 12th | |
| 2025–26 | 7 | 2ª Ext. | | |

- 4 seasons in Tercera División
