= CD Zafra =

Spanish football club

Zafra
- Full name: Club Deportivo Zafra
- Founded: 2000 (as UD Zafra Atlético)
- Ground: Nuevo Estadio, Zafra, Extremadura, Spain
- Capacity: 2,500
- President: José Luis Rodríguez
- Manager: Ángel Gutiérrez
- League: Tercera Federación – Group 14
- 2025–26: Primera Extremeña – Group 4, 1st of 14 (champions)
- Website: clubdeportivozafra.es
Home colours	Away colours

Club Deportivo Zafra is a Spanish football team based in Zafra, in the autonomous community of Extremadura. Founded in 200, they play in Tercera Federación – Group 14, holding home matches at Nuevo Estadio de Zafra, with a capacity of 2,500 people.

== History ==
Founded in 2000 as UD Zafra Atlético, the club only played one senior season in the 2006–07 campaign, after an agreement with CD Hotel Zafra. In 2017, shortly after the dissolution of CD Díter Zafra, the club again started a senior team.

In April 2021, the associates voted on a possible name change of the club, which was later confirmed to be CD Zafra, effective as of that July. On 17 May 2026, Zafra achieved a first-ever promotion to Tercera Federación after defeating CD Quintana in the play-offs, including a club from the city in a national division after a nine-year absence.

=== Club background ===
- Unión Deportiva Zafra Atlético (2000–2021)
- Club Deportivo Zafra (2021–)

== Season to season ==
Season	Tier	Division	Place	Copa del Rey
2017–18	6	2ª Ext.	3rd	
2018–19	5	1ª Ext.	3rd	
2019–20	5	1ª Ext.	4th	
2020–21	5	1ª Ext.	6th	
2021–22	6	1ª Ext.	3rd	
2022–23	6	1ª Ext.	7th	
2023–24	6	1ª Ext.	10th	
2024–25	6	1ª Ext.	6th	
2025–26	6	1ª Ext.	1st	
2026–27	5	3ª Fed.		

- 1 season in Tercera Federación
