= AD Lobón =

Association football club in Spain

Lobón
- Full name: Asociación Deportiva Lobón
- Founded: 1997
- Ground: Municipal, Lobón, Badajoz, Extremadura, Spain
- Capacity: 1,500
- Chairman: José Luis Salido Gata
- Manager: Mario Ballesteros
- League: Primera Extremeña – Group 2
- 2025–26: Primera Extremeña – Group 2, 3rd of 14
Home colours	Away colours

Asociación Deportiva Lobón is a Spanish football team based in Lobón, Badajoz, in the autonomous community of Extremadura. Founded in 1997, it currently plays in Primera Extremeña – Group 2, holding home matches at Estadio Municipal de Lobón, with a capacity of 1,500 spectators.

== History ==
Founded in 1997, the club played occasionally in the Primera Regional while also spending some seasons without a senior team. In 2016, the club first reached the Primera División Extremeña, the top tier of regional football.

After winning the fifth tier in 2018–19, Lobón was qualified to the 2019–20 Copa del Rey, but lost in the preliminary round. In July 2020, the club achieved a first-ever promotion to Tercera División.

== Season to season ==
Season	Tier	Division	Place	Copa del Rey
1999–2000	6	1ª Reg.	13th	
2000–01	6	1ª Reg.	4th	
2001–02	6	1ª Reg.	9th	
2002–03	6	1ª Reg.	4th	
2003–04	6	1ª Reg.	4th	
2004–05	6	1ª Reg.	11th	
2005–06	DNP			
2006–07	6	1ª Reg.	14th	
2007–08	6	1ª Reg.	15th	
2008–2013	DNP			
2013–14	6	1ª Reg.	13th	
2014–15	6	1ª Reg.	5th	
2015–16	6	1ª Reg.	1st	
2016–17	5	1ª Ext.	9th	
2017–18	5	1ª Ext.	5th	
2018–19	5	1ª Ext.	1st	
2019–20	5	1ª Ext.	3rd	Preliminary
2020–21	4	3ª	11th	
2021–22	6	1ª Ext.	5th	
2022–23	6	1ª Ext.	7th	

Season	Tier	Division	Place	Copa del Rey
2023–24	6	1ª Ext.	4th	
2024–25	6	1ª Ext.	6th	
2025–26	6	1ª Ext.		

1 season in Tercera División
