= CD Valdelacalzada =

Spanish football team

Valdelacalzada
- Full name: Club Deportivo Valdelacalzada
- Founded: 1965
- Ground: Estadio Municipal, Valdelacalzada, Extremadura, Spain
- Capacity: 800
- Chairman: (Spain) Juan Francisco García
- Manager: (Spain) Juan Jose Cidoncha Rodriguez
- League: Primera Extremeña – Group 2
- 2024–25: Primera Extremeña – Group 2, 8th of 12
Home colours	Away colours

Club Deportivo Valdelacalzada is a football team based in Valdelacalzada in the autonomous community of Extremadura. Founded in 1965, it plays in Primera Extremeña – Group 2.

== Season to season ==
Season	Tier	Division	Place	Copa del Rey
1969–70	5	2ª Reg.	1st	
1970–71	DNP			
1971–72	DNP			
1972–73	DNP			
1973–74	5	2ª Reg.	13th	
1974–75	5	1ª Reg.	7th	
1975–76	5	1ª Reg.	4th	
1976–77	5	1ª Reg.	4th	
1977–78	6	1ª Reg.	3rd	
1978–79	6	1ª Reg.	1st	
1979–80	5	Reg. Pref.	9th	
1980–81	5	Reg. Pref.	17th	
1981–82	6	1ª Reg.	19th	
1982–83	6	1ª Reg.	1st	
1983–84	5	Reg. Pref.	5th	
1984–85	5	Reg. Pref.	14th	
1985–86	5	Reg. Pref.	12th	
1986–87	5	Reg. Pref.	16th	
1987–88	5	Reg. Pref.	8th	
1988–89	5	Reg. Pref.	10th	

Season	Tier	Division	Place	Copa del Rey
1989–90	5	Reg. Pref.	7th	
1990–91	5	Reg. Pref.	16th	
1991–92	5	Reg. Pref.	7th	
1992–93	5	Reg. Pref.	1st	
1993–94	4	3ª	19th	
1994–95	5	Reg. Pref.	5th	
1995–96	5	Reg. Pref.	3rd	
1996–97	5	Reg. Pref.	1st	
1997–98	4	3ª	11th	
1998–99	4	3ª	6th	
1999–2000	4	3ª	9th	
2000–01	4	3ª	11th	
2001–02	4	3ª	16th	
2002–03	4	3ª	17th	
2003–04	5	Reg. Pref.	14th	
2004–05	5	Reg. Pref.	7th	
2005–06	5	Reg. Pref.	9th	
2006–07	5	Reg. Pref.	2nd	
2007–08	4	3ª	16th	
2008–09	4	3ª	8th	

Season	Tier	Division	Place	Copa del Rey
2009–10	4	3ª	15th	
2010–11	4	3ª	17th	
2011–12	4	3ª	12th	
2012–13	4	3ª	20th	
2013–14	5	Reg. Pref.	6th	
2014–15	5	Reg. Pref.	2nd	
2015–16	4	3ª	19th	
2016–17	5	1ª Ext.	5th	
2017–18	5	1ª Ext.	3rd	
2018–19	4	3ª	20th	
2019–20	5	1ª Ext.	8th	
2020–21	5	1ª Ext.	1st	
2021–22	6	1ª Ext.	9th	
2022–23	6	1ª Ext.	4th	
2023–24	6	1ª Ext.	9th	
2024–25	6	1ª Ext.	8th	
2025–26	6	1ª Ext.		

- 15 seasons in Tercera División
