= Malpartida de Plasencia =

Coordinates: 39°59′N 6°02′W

Malpartida de Plasencia, Spain
- municipality
- Flag Coat of arms
- Interactive map of Malpartida de Plasencia, Spain
- Country: Spain
- Autonomous community: Extremadura
- Province: Cáceres
- Municipality: Malpartida de Plasencia

Area
  - Total: 373 km^{2} (144 sq mi)
- Elevation: 467 m (1,532 ft)

Population (2025-01-01)
  - Total: 4,666
  - Density: 12.5/km^{2} (32.4/sq mi)
- Time zone: UTC+1 (CET)

Malpartida de Plasencia is a municipality located in the province of Cáceres, Extremadura, Spain. According to the 2015 census (INE), the municipality has a population of 4714 inhabitants.

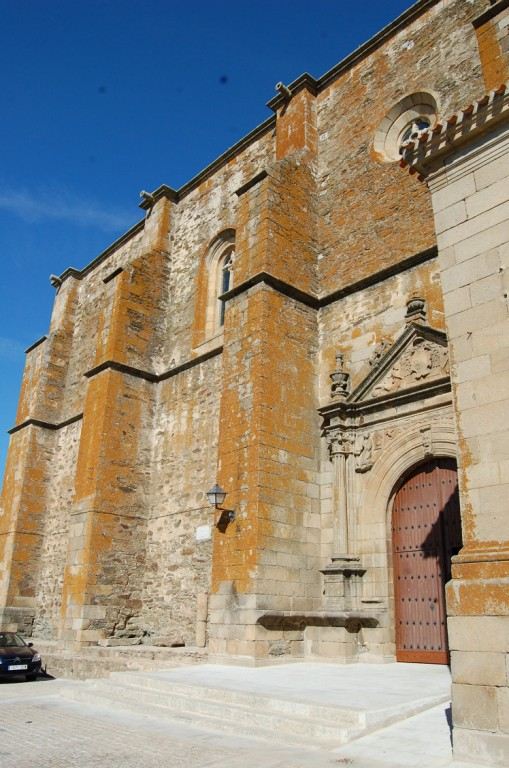
San Juan Church in Malpartida de Plasencia

== See also ==
- List of municipalities in Cáceres
