= CD Badajoz B =

Spanish football club

Badajoz B
- Full name: Club Deportivo Badajoz "B"
- Founded: 1965 (as CD Careva); 1971 (Badajoz B); 2013; reformed
- Ground: Nuevo Vivero, Badajoz, Extremadura, Spain
- Capacity: 14,898
- President: Luis Díaz-Ambrona
- Head coach: Juli Caro
- League: Primera Extremeña – Group 2
- 2024–25: Primera Extremeña – Group 2, 10th of 12
- Website: https://www.clubdeportivobadajoz.es/
Home colours	Away colours	Third colours

Club Deportivo Badajoz "B" is a Spanish football team based in Badajoz, in the autonomous community of Extremadura. Refounded in 2013 as the reserve team of CD Badajoz, it currently plays in Primera Extremeña – Group 2, and holds home games at Estadio Nuevo Vivero, with a 14,898-seat capacity.

== History ==
Club Deportivo Careva was founded in 1965, and was renamed Club Deportivo Badajoz Promesas in 1977, but had no affiliation with CD Badajoz. Meanwhile, in the 1971–72 and 1974–75 seasons, and between 1979 and 1982, a club called Club Deportivo Badajoz B (this one being a reserve team of Badajoz) played in the regional leagues.

Badajoz Promesas achieved promotion to Tercera División in 1983, but suffered relegation to the Regional Preferente in 1985. In that year, after Badajoz was relegated to the fourth division, Antonio Guevara (at the time president of Badajoz Promesas) became president of Badajoz, and turned Badajoz Promesas into a reserve team.

In 1993, Badajoz Promesas was renamed into CD Badajoz B, being fully integrated into the Badajoz's structure, and playing in the fourth tier until 2005. In the following year, after the first team's relegation to the fourth division, the B-team ceased activities.

In 2013, Badajoz B returned to an active status, one year after the first team's refoundation. In 2021, the club achieved promotion to the Tercera División RFEF, the new fifth tier.

== Season to season ==
=== Careva / Badajoz Promesas ===
Season	Tier	Division	Place	Copa del Rey
1965–66		Regional		
1966–67		Regional		
1967–68		Regional		
1968–69	4	1ª Reg.	14th	
1969–70	4	1ª Reg.	6th	
1970–71	4	1ª Reg.	11th	
1971–72	4	1ª Reg.	8th	
1972–73	4	1ª Reg.	8th	
1973–74	4	1ª Reg.	9th	
1974–75	4	Reg. Pref.	14th	
1975–76	4	Reg. Pref.	8th	
1976–77	4	Reg. Pref.	14th	
1977–78	5	Reg. Pref.	18th	
1978–79	6	1ª Reg.	13th	

Season	Tier	Division	Place	Copa del Rey
1979–80	6	1ª Reg.	2nd	
1980–81	5	Reg. Pref.	13th	
1981–82	5	Reg. Pref.	19th	
1982–83	5	Reg. Pref.	9th	
1983–84	4	3ª	15th	
1984–85	4	3ª	17th	
1985–86	5	Reg. Pref.	3rd	
1986–87	5	Reg. Pref.	1st	
1987–88	4	3ª	8th	
1988–89	4	3ª	12th	
1989–90	4	3ª	7th	
1990–91	4	3ª	6th	
1991–92	4	3ª	9th	
1992–93	4	3ª	6th	

- 8 seasons in Tercera División

=== Old Badajoz B ===
Season	Tier	Division	Place	Copa del Rey
1971–72	5	1ª Reg.	3rd	
1972–73	DNP			
1973–74	DNP			
1974–75	5	1ª Reg.	6th	
1975–1979	DNP			
1979–80	6	1ª Reg.	1st	
1980–81	5	Reg. Pref.	12th	
1981–82	5	Reg. Pref.	13th	

=== Badajoz B (1993–2006) ===
Season	Tier	Division	Place
1993–94	4	3ª	6th
1994–95	4	3ª	3rd
1995–96	4	3ª	12th
1996–97	4	3ª	7th
1997–98	4	3ª	4th
1998–99	4	3ª	8th
1999–2000	4	3ª	13th

Season	Tier	Division	Place
2000–01	4	3ª	8th
2001–02	4	3ª	5th
2002–03	4	3ª	5th
2003–04	4	3ª	5th
2004–05	4	3ª	18th
2005–06	5	Reg. Pref.	2nd

- 12 seasons in Tercera División

=== Team re-founded ===
Season	Tier	Division	Place
2013–14	6	1ª Reg.	5th
2014–15	6	1ª Reg.	1st
2015–16	5	Reg. Pref.	9th
2016–17	5	1ª Ext.	8th
2017–18	5	1ª Ext.	13th
2018–19	5	1ª Ext.	3rd
2019–20	5	1ª Ext.	5th
2020–21	5	1ª Ext.	1st
2021–22	5	3ª RFEF	19th
2022–23	6	1ª Ext.	12th
2023–24	7	2ª Ext.	1st
2024–25	6	1ª Ext.	10th
2025–26	6	1ª Ext.	

- 1 season in Tercera División RFEF
