= CF Trujillo =

Spanish football team

Trujillo
- Full name: Club de Fútbol Trujillo
- Founded: 1942
- Ground: Estadio Municipal, Trujillo, Extremadura, Spain
- Capacity: 2,000
- Chairman: (Spain) Angel Barquero Alonso
- Manager: (Spain) Maxi Ovejero
- League: Primera Extremeña – Group 1
- 2024–25: Tercera Federación – Group 14, 16th of 18 (relegated)
Home colours	Away colours

Club de Fútbol Trujillo is a Spanish football team based in Trujillo, in the autonomous community of Extremadura. Founded in 1942, it plays in Primera Extremeña – Group 1, holding home games at Estadio Municipal de Trujillo.

== Season to season ==
Season	Tier	Division	Place	Copa del Rey
1942–43	3	1ª Reg.	5th	
1943–44	3	3ª	4th	
1944–45	3	3ª	10th	
1945–1950	DNP			
1950–51	4	1ª Reg.	6th	
1951–52	4	1ª Reg.	(R)	
1952–1960	DNP			
1960–1965	—	Regional	—	
1965–66	5	2ª Reg.	4th	
1966–67	5	2ª Reg.	1st	
1967–68	4	1ª Reg.	5th	
1968–69	4	1ª Reg.	13th	
1969–70	4	1ª Reg.	16th	
1970–71	5	2ª Reg.	1st	
1971–72	4	1ª Reg.	16th	
1972–73	4	1ª Reg.	18th	
1973–74	5	2ª Reg.	2nd	
1974–75	5	1ª Reg.	1st	
1975–76	4	Reg. Pref.	17th	
1976–77	4	Reg. Pref.	20th	

Season	Tier	Division	Place	Copa del Rey
1977–78	5	Reg. Pref.	19th	
1978–79	6	1ª Reg.	5th	
1979–80	6	1ª Reg.	7th	
1980–81	6	1ª Reg.	6th	
1981–82	6	1ª Reg.	4th	
1982–83	6	1ª Reg.	6th	
1983–84	6	1ª Reg.	9th	
1984–85	6	1ª Reg.	3rd	
1985–86	6	1ª Reg.	8th	
1986–87	6	1ª Reg.	3rd	
1987–88	6	1ª Reg.	4th	
1988–89	6	1ª Reg.	1st	
1989–90	5	Reg. Pref.	20th	
1990–91	6	1ª Reg.	7th	
1991–92	6	1ª Reg.	1st	
1992–93	5	Reg. Pref.	4th	
1993–94	5	Reg. Pref.	3rd	
1994–95	4	3ª	18th	
1995–96	5	Reg. Pref.	3rd	
1996–97	5	Reg. Pref.	5th	

Season	Tier	Division	Place	Copa del Rey
1997–98	5	Reg. Pref.	8th	
1998–99	5	Reg. Pref.	8th	
1999–2000	5	Reg. Pref.	4th	
2000–01	5	Reg. Pref.	3rd	
2001–02	5	Reg. Pref.	12th	
2002–03	5	Reg. Pref.	14th	
2003–04	5	Reg. Pref.	14th	
2004–05	5	Reg. Pref.	2nd	
2005–06	5	Reg. Pref.	3rd	
2006–07	5	Reg. Pref.	3rd	
2007–08	5	Reg. Pref.	13th	
2008–09	5	Reg. Pref.	8th	
2009–10	5	Reg. Pref.	17th	
2010–11	5	Reg. Pref.	9th	
2011–12	5	Reg. Pref.	10th	
2012–13	5	Reg. Pref.	8th	
2013–14	5	Reg. Pref.	11th	
2014–15	5	Reg. Pref.	13th	
2015–16	5	Reg. Pref.	2nd	
2016–17	5	1ª Ext.	1st	

Season	Tier	Division	Place	Copa del Rey
2017–18	4	3ª	19th	
2018–19	5	1ª Ext.	1st	
2019–20	4	3ª	7th	
2020–21	4	3ª	8th / 2nd	
2021–22	5	3ª RFEF	6th	
2022–23	5	3ª Fed.	7th	
2023–24	5	3ª Fed.	14th	
2024–25	5	3ª Fed.	16th	
2025–26	6	1ª Ext.		

- 6 seasons in Tercera División
- 4 seasons in Tercera Federación/Tercera División RFEF
