= UP Plasencia =

Spanish football club

Plasencia
- Full name: Unión Polideportiva Plasencia
- Founded: 1940 (as AD Constancia)
- Ground: Ciudad Deportiva, Plasencia, Extremadura, Spain
- Capacity: 5,000
- President: Ruben Hernandez Fernandez
- Head coach: Daniel Simon Segura
- League: Tercera Federación – Group 14
- 2025–26: Primera Extremeña – Group 1, 1st of 14 (champions)
Home colours	Away colours

Unión Polideportiva Plasencia is a football team based in Plasencia in the autonomous community of Extremadura. Founded in 1940, it plays in the Tercera Federación – Group 14. Its stadium is Ciudad Deportiva with a capacity of 5,000 seats.

== History ==
The origins of football in Palencia trace back to the 1920s, but the history of UP Plasencia begins in 1940, the year of the merger between Agrupación Deportiva Palentina and La Constancia to create AD Constancia. Constancia then achieved promotion to Tercera División in 1944, changing name to Plasencia CF.

Plasencia CF officially folded in 1947, with CD Plasencia taking their place. A new promotion to Tercera occurred in 1954, with the club remaining in the division until 1970. Four years later, CD Plasencia merged with Plasencia Industrial CF to create UP Plasencia.

In the 2018-19 season, Plasencia finished 5th with 70 points in 38 games in Tercera División, Group 14.

== Club background ==
- Agrupación Deportiva Constancia (1940–44)
- Plasencia Club de Fútbol (1944–47)
- Club Deportivo Plasencia (1947–74)
- Plasencia Industrial Club de Fútbol (1970–1974)
- Unión Polideportiva Plasencia (1974–)

== Season to season ==
=== AD Constancia/Plasencia CF ===
Season	Tier	Division	Place	Copa del Rey
1940–41	4	1ª Reg.	3rd	
1941–42	4	2ª Reg.		
1942–43	4	2ª Reg.		
1943–44	4	1ª Reg.	1st	
1944–45	3	3ª	6th	
1945–46	3	3ª	9th	
1946–47	3	3ª	9th	

- 3 seasons in Tercera División

=== CD Plasencia ===
Season	Tier	Division	Place	Copa del Rey
1947–1952	—	Regional	—	
1952–53	4	1ª Reg.	4th	
1953–54	4	1ª Reg.	4th	
1954–55	3	3ª	9th	
1955–56	3	3ª	6th	
1956–57	3	3ª	5th	
1957–58	3	3ª	5th	
1958–59	3	3ª	4th	
1959–60	3	3ª	4th	
1960–61	3	3ª	7th	
1961–62	3	3ª	8th	
1962–63	3	3ª	10th	

Season	Tier	Division	Place	Copa del Rey
1963–64	3	3ª	15th	
1964–65	3	3ª	10th	
1965–66	3	3ª	11th	
1966–67	3	3ª	11th	
1967–68	3	3ª	9th	
1968–69	3	3ª	16th	
1969–70	3	3ª	10th	First round
1970–71	4	1ª Reg.	5th	
1971–72	4	1ª Reg.	9th	
1972–73	4	1ª Reg.	6th	
1973–74	4	1ª Reg.	12th	

- 16 seasons in Tercera División

=== Plasencia Industrial CF ===
Season	Tier	Division	Place	Copa del Rey
1969–70	5	2ª Reg.	1st	
1970–71	4	1ª Reg.	8th	
1971–72	4	1ª Reg.	10th	
1972–73	4	1ª Reg.	12th	
1973–74	4	1ª Reg.	15th	

=== UP Plasencia ===
Season	Tier	Division	Place	Copa del Rey
1974–75	4	Reg. Pref.	11th	
1975–76	4	Reg. Pref.	11th	
1976–77	4	Reg. Pref.	2nd	
1977–78	4	3ª	18th	Second round
1978–79	5	Reg. Pref.	1st	
1979–80	4	3ª	13th	First round
1980–81	4	3ª	14th	
1981–82	4	3ª	7th	
1982–83	4	3ª	10th	
1983–84	4	3ª	2nd	
1984–85	4	3ª	1st	First round
1985–86	3	2ª B	13th	Third round
1986–87	4	3ª	3rd	
1987–88	3	2ª B	16th	Second round
1988–89	3	2ª B	17th	First round
1989–90	4	3ª	4th	
1990–91	4	3ª	3rd	First round
1991–92	4	3ª	1st	First round
1992–93	4	3ª	4th	First round
1993–94	4	3ª	2nd	

Season	Tier	Division	Place	Copa del Rey
1994–95	4	3ª	5th	
1995–96	4	3ª	5th	
1996–97	4	3ª	3rd	
1997–98	3	2ª B	13th	First round
1998–99	3	2ª B	17th	
1999–2000	4	3ª	3rd	
2000–01	4	3ª	3rd	
2001–02	4	3ª	6th	
2002–03	4	3ª	6th	
2003–04	4	3ª	4th	
2004–05	4	3ª	8th	
2005–06	4	3ª	8th	
2006–07	4	3ª	13th	
2007–08	4	3ª	5th	
2008–09	4	3ª	19th	
2009–10	5	Reg. Pref.	1st	
2010–11	4	3ª	13th	
2011–12	4	3ª	10th	
2012–13	4	3ª	8th	
2013–14	4	3ª	11th	

Season	Tier	Division	Place	Copa del Rey
2014–15	4	3ª	19th	
2015–16	5	Reg. Pref.	1st	
2016–17	4	3ª	8th	
2017–18	4	3ª	3rd	
2018–19	4	3ª	5th	
2019–20	4	3ª	13th	
2020–21	4	3ª	5th / 1st	
2021–22	5	3ª RFEF	9th	
2022–23	5	3ª Fed.	15th	
2023–24	6	1ª Ext.	9th	
2024–25	6	1ª Ext.	10th	
2025–26	6	1ª Ext.	1st	
2026–27	5	3ª Fed.		

- 5 seasons in Segunda División B
- 36 seasons in Tercera División
- 3 seasons in Tercera Federación/Tercera División RFEF
