= EMD Aceuchal =

Association football club

Aceuchal
- Full name: Escuela Municipal Deportiva Aceuchal
- Founded: 2002
- Ground: Municipal, Aceuchal, Extremadura, Spain
- Capacity: 1,000
- President: Alejandro Asencio
- Manager: José Cisneros
- League: Primera Extremeña – Group 4
- 2024–25: Primera Extremeña – Group 4, 7th of 12
| Home colours | Away colours |

Escuela Municipal Deportiva Aceuchal is a Spanish football team based in Aceuchal, in the autonomous community of Extremadura. Founded in 2002, they play in Primera Extremeña – Group 4, holding home games at Polideportivo Municipal de Aceuchal.

== History ==
Founded in 2002 as a replacement to dissolved CD Aceuchal, EMD Aceuchal first reached the Regional Preferente in 2011. In June 2017, the club achieved a first-ever promotion to Tercera División, putting a club from the city in a national tournament after a 29-year absence.

== Season to season ==
| Season | Tier | Division | Place | Copa del Rey |
|---|---|---|---|---|
| 2002–03 | 6 | 1ª Reg. | 8th | |
| 2003–04 | 6 | 1ª Reg. | 7th | |
| 2004–05 | 6 | 1ª Reg. | 7th | |
| 2005–06 | 6 | 1ª Reg. | 11th | |
| 2006–07 | 6 | 1ª Reg. | 5th | |
| 2007–08 | 6 | 1ª Reg. | 5th | |
| 2008–09 | 6 | 1ª Reg. | 10th | |
| 2009–10 | 6 | 1ª Reg. | 13th | |
| 2010–11 | 6 | 1ª Reg. | 3rd | |
| 2011–12 | 5 | Reg. Pref. | 14th | |
| 2012–13 | 5 | Reg. Pref. | 1st | |
| 2013–14 | 5 | Reg. Pref. | 4th | |
| 2014–15 | 5 | Reg. Pref. | 1st | |
| 2015–16 | 5 | Reg. Pref. | 7th | |
| 2016–17 | 5 | 1ª Ext. | 3rd | |
| 2017–18 | 4 | 3ª | 11th | |
| 2018–19 | 4 | 3ª | 16th | |
| 2019–20 | 4 | 3ª | 8th | |
| 2020–21 | 4 | 3ª | 6th / 5th | |
| 2021–22 | 5 | 3ª RFEF | 14th | |

| Season | Tier | Division | Place | Copa del Rey |
|---|---|---|---|---|
| 2022–23 | 6 | 1ª Ext. | 3rd | |
| 2023–24 | 6 | 1ª Ext. | 7th | |
| 2024–25 | 6 | 1ª Ext. | 7th | |
| 2025–26 | 6 | 1ª Ext. | 12th | |

- 4 seasons in Tercera División
- 1 season in Tercera División RFEF
