= CP Sanvicenteño =

C.P. Sanvicenteño
- Full name: Club Polideportivo Sanvicenteño
- Nickname: Sanvi
- Founded: 1957
- Ground: Ciudad Deportiva, San Vicente de Alcántara, Extremadura, Spain
- Capacity: 1,500
- Chairman: (Spain) Francisco Caballero
- Manager: (Spain) Alberto Román
- League: Primera Extremeña – Group 2
- 2024–25: Primera Extremeña – Group 2, 4th of 12
Home colours	Away colours

Club Polideportivo Sanvicenteño is a Spanish football team based in San Vicente de Alcántara in the autonomous community of Extremadura. Founded in 1957, it plays in Primera Extremeña – Group 2.

== History ==
Founded in 1957 as C.D. Sanvicenteño, it was renamed Sanvicenteño F.C. in 1967. In 2001 it was reestablished as C.P. Sanvicenteño and started in Primera Regional de Extremadura (Level 6).

=== Club background ===
- Club Deportivo Sanvicenteño - (1957–1967)
- Sanvicenteño Fútbol Club - (1967–2001)
- Club Polideportivo Sanvicenteño - (2001–)

== Season to season ==
Season	Tier	Division	Place	Copa del Rey
1958–59	5	3ª Reg.		
1959–60	4	1ª Reg.	2nd	
1960–61	4	1ª Reg.	1st	
1961–62	4	1ª Reg.	6th	
1962–63	4	1ª Reg.	5th	
1963–1968	DNP			
1968–69	5	2ª Reg.	1st	
1969–70	4	1ª Reg.	14th	
1970–71	5	2ª Reg.	7th	
1971–72	5	2ª Reg.	7th	
1972–73	5	2ª Reg.	2nd	
1973–74	5	2ª Reg.	12th	
1974–75	5	1ª Reg.	3rd	
1975–76	5	1ª Reg.	6th	
1976–77	5	1ª Reg.	1st	
1977–78	5	Reg. Pref.	13th	
1978–79	5	Reg. Pref.	16th	
1979–80	5	Reg. Pref.	11th	
1980–81	5	Reg. Pref.	14th	
1981–82	5	Reg. Pref.	5th	

Season	Tier	Division	Place	Copa del Rey
1982–83	5	Reg. Pref.	7th	
1983–84	4	3ª	16th	
1984–85	4	3ª	11th	
1985–86	4	3ª	10th	
1986–87	4	3ª	5th	
1987–88	4	3ª	15th	Third round
1988–89	4	3ª	13th	
1989–90	4	3ª	17th	
1990–91	4	3ª	18th	
1991–92	5	Reg. Pref.	19th	
1992–93	6	1ª Reg.	1st	
1993–94	5	Reg. Pref.	10th	
1994–95	5	Reg. Pref.	1st	
1995–96	4	3ª	18th	
1996–97	5	Reg. Pref.	8th	
1997–99	5	Reg. Pref.	3rd	
1998–99	5	Reg. Pref.	1st	
1999–2000	4	3ª	15th	
2000–01	4	3ª	19th	
2001–02	5	Reg. Pref.	20th	

Season	Tier	Division	Place	Copa del Rey
2002–03	6	1ª Reg.	2nd	
2003–04	5	Reg. Pref.	6th	
2004–05	5	Reg. Pref.	3rd	
2005–06	5	Reg. Pref.	1st	
2006–07	4	3ª	15th	
2007–08	4	3ª	17th	
2008–09	4	3ª	14th	
2009–10	4	3ª	9th	
2010–11	4	3ª	10th	
2011–12	4	3ª	18th	
2012–13	5	Reg. Pref.	1st	
2013–14	5	Reg. Pref.	1st	
2014–15	4	3ª	16th	
2015–16	4	3ª	18th	
2016–17	5	1ª Ext.	6th	
2017–18	5	1ª Ext.	4th	
2018–19	5	1ª Ext.	4th	
2020–21	5	1ª Ext.	3rd	
2021–22	6	1ª Ext.	2nd	

Season	Tier	Division	Place	Copa del Rey
2022–23	6	1ª Ext.	6th	
2023–24	6	1ª Ext.	5th	
2024–25	6	1ª Ext.	4th	
2025–26	6	1ª Ext.		

- 19 seasons in Tercera División
