= CD Guadiana =

Association football team in Spain

Guadiana
- Full name: Club Deportivo Guadiana
- Founded: 1963
- Ground: Ernesto Sánchez Millán, Guadiana, Extremadura, Spain
- Capacity: 1,000
- President: Deme Gómez
- Manager: Jesús Martín
- League: Tercera Federación – Group 14
- 2025–26: Primera Extremeña – Group 2, 1st of 14 (champions)
Home colours	Away colours

Club Deportivo Guadiana is a football team based in Guadiana, in the autonomous community of Extremadura. Founded in 1963, they play in Tercera Federación – Group 14, holding home matches at the Polideportivo Municipal Ernesto Sánchez Millán, with a capacity of 1,000 people.

== History ==
Founded in 1963, the club was called Unión Deportiva PGESA-Guadiana between 1979 and 1986, before switching to their current name. In 1995, they achieved a first-ever promotion to Tercera División.

== Season to season ==
Season	Tier	Division	Place	Copa del Rey
1963–1980	—	Regional	—	
1980–81	6	1ª Reg.	17th	
1981–82	6	1ª Reg.	3rd	
1982–83	6	1ª Reg.	8th	
1983–84	6	1ª Reg.	11th	
1984–85	6	1ª Reg.	7th	
1985–86	6	1ª Reg.	13th	
1986–87	6	1ª Reg.	15th	
1987–88	6	1ª Reg.	6th	
1988–89	6	1ª Reg.	11th	
1989–90	6	1ª Reg.	3rd	
1990–91	6	1ª Reg.	4th	
1991–92	6	1ª Reg.	1st	
1992–93	5	Reg. Pref.	10th	
1993–94	5	Reg. Pref.	2nd	
1994–95	5	Reg. Pref.	2nd	
1995–96	4	3ª	9th	
1996–97	4	3ª	12th	
1997–98	4	3ª	17th	
1998–99	4	3ª	18th	

Season	Tier	Division	Place	Copa del Rey
1999–2000	5	Reg. Pref.	4th	
2000–01	5	Reg. Pref.	8th	
2001–02	5	Reg. Pref.	3rd	
2002–03	4	3ª	18th	
2003–04	5	Reg. Pref.	11th	
2004–05	5	Reg. Pref.	12th	
2005–06	5	Reg. Pref.	12th	
2006–07	5	Reg. Pref.	13th	
2007–08	5	Reg. Pref.	12th	
2008–09	5	Reg. Pref.	10th	
2009–10	5	Reg. Pref.	13th	
2010–11	5	Reg. Pref.	16th	
2011–12	5	Reg. Pref.	7th	
2012–13	5	Reg. Pref.	5th	
2013–14	5	Reg. Pref.	9th	
2014–15	5	Reg. Pref.	6th	
2015–16	5	Reg. Pref.	2nd	
2016–17	5	1ª Ext.	4th	
2017–18	5	1ª Ext.	5th	
2018–19	5	1ª Ext.	5th	

Season	Tier	Division	Place	Copa del Rey
2019–20	5	1ª Ext.	9th	
2020–21	5	1ª Ext.	4th	
2021–22	6	1ª Ext.	7th	
2022–23	6	1ª Ext.	3rd	
2023–24	6	1ª Ext.	3rd	
2024–25	6	1ª Ext.	3rd	
2025–26	6	1ª Ext.	1st	
2026–27	5	3ª Fed.		

- 5 seasons in Tercera División
- 1 season in Tercera Federación
