= CD Díter Zafra =

Spanish football club

Díter Zafra
- Full name: Club Deportivo Díter Zafra
- Founded: 1930
- Dissolved: 2017
- Ground: Nuevo Estadio, Zafra, Extremadura, Spain
- Capacity: 2,500
- 2016–17: Tercera División – Group 14, 19th of 20
Home colours	Away colours

Club Deportivo Díter Zafra was a Spanish football team based in Zafra, in the autonomous community of Extremadura. Founded in 1930, it last played in 3ª – Group 14, holding home matches at Nuevo Estadio de Zafra, with a capacity of 5,000 seats.

== History ==
The club announced its dissolution on 28 January 2017. This decision was overturned two days later when a group of former club directors decided to invest in the team, and they continued with their season.

Finally, Díter Zafra was dissolved in August 2017. Shortly after, UD Zafra Atlético (founded in 2000) started a senior side and inherited Díter Zafra's colors; this club was renamed CD Zafra in 2021.

=== Club background ===
- Club Deportivo Zafra (1930–1975)
- Club Deportivo Diter Zafra (1975–1979; 1984–1993; 1999–2017)
- Club Deportivo MWM-Diter Zafra (1979–1984)
- Club Deportivo Muebles Zambrano (1993–1994)
- Club Deportivo Zafra Industrial (1994–1999)

== Season to season ==
Season	Tier	Division	Place	Copa del Rey
1932–33	4	1ª Reg.	5th	
1933–34	4	1ª Reg.	2nd	
1934–35	4	1ª Reg.	8th	
1935–1958	DNP			
1958–59	4	1ª Reg.	6th	
1959–60	4	1ª Reg.	4th	
1960–61	4	1ª Reg.	5th	
1961–62	4	1ª Reg.	4th	
1962–63	4	1ª Reg.	6th	
1963–64	4	1ª Reg.	3rd	
1964–1969	DNP			
1969–70	4	1ª Reg.	4th	
1970–71	4	1ª Reg.	9th	
1971–72	4	1ª Reg.	17th	
1972–73	4	1ª Reg.	4th	
1973–74	4	1ª Reg.	2nd	
1974–75	4	Reg. Pref.	2nd	
1975–76	3	3ª	15th	First round
1976–77	3	3ª	5th	First round
1977–78	3	2ª B	9th	First round

Season	Tier	Division	Place	Copa del Rey
1978–79	3	2ª B	12th	Second round
1979–80	3	2ª B	16th	First round
1980–81	3	2ª B	19th	
1981–82	4	3ª	4th	
1982–83	4	3ª	7th	First round
1983–84	4	3ª	1st	
1984–85	4	3ª	5th	First round
1985–86	4	3ª	9th	First round
1986–87	4	3ª	14th	
1987–88	4	3ª	9th	
1988–89	4	3ª	8th	
1989–90	4	3ª	10th	
1990–91	4	3ª	14th	
1991–92	4	3ª	13th	
1992–93	4	3ª	18th	
1993–94	5	Reg. Pref.	17th	
1994–95	5	Reg. Pref.	9th	
1995–96	5	Reg. Pref.	1st	
1996–97	4	3ª	14th	
1997–98	4	3ª	8th	

Season	Tier	Division	Place	Copa del Rey
1998–99	4	3ª	7th	
1999–2000	4	3ª	6th	
2000–01	4	3ª	1st	
2001–02	3	2ª B	13th	Round of 32
2002–03	3	2ª B	17th	
2003–04	4	3ª	2nd	
2004–05	3	2ª B	14th	
2005–06	3	2ª B	20th	
2006–07	4	3ª	5th	
2007–08	4	3ª	6th	

Season	Tier	Division	Place	Copa del Rey
2008–09	4	3ª	18th	
2009–10	5	Reg. Pref.	1st	
2010–11	4	3ª	12th	
2011–12	4	3ª	2nd	
2012–13	4	3ª	4th	
2013–14	4	3ª	8th	
2014–15	4	3ª	11th	
2015–16	4	3ª	10th	
2016–17	4	3ª	19th	

- 8 seasons in Segunda División B
- 31 seasons in Tercera División
- 10 seasons in Divisiones Regionales

== Famous players ==
- (Spain) Hipólito Rincón
