= UD Montijo =

Spanish association football club

Montijo
- Full name: Unión Deportiva Montijo
- Founded: 1922; 104 years ago
- Stadium: Emilio Macarro Rodríguez
- Capacity: 2,000
- President: Pierpaolo Camplone
- Head coach: Juan Carlos Cruz
- League: Tercera Federación – Group 14
- 2025–26: Tercera Federación – Group 14, 9th of 18
Home colours	Away colours

Unión Deportiva Montijo is a football team based in Montijo, Extremadura. Founded in 1922, Montijo competes in the Tercera Federación – Group 14. The club plays home matches at the Estadio Municipal Emilio Macarro Rodríguez.

== Season to season ==
Season	Tier	Division	Place	Copa del Rey
1922–1950	—	Regional	—	
1950–51	4	1ª Reg.	1st	
1951–52	4	1ª Reg.	6th	
1952–53	4	1ª Reg.	3rd	
1953–54	4	1ª Reg.		
1954–55	4	1ª Reg.		
1955–56	4	1ª Reg.		
1956–1968	DNP			
1968–69	5	2ª Reg.	3rd	
1969–70	5	2ª Reg.	2nd	
1970–1974	DNP			
1974–75	5	1ª Reg.	1st	
1975–76	4	Reg. Pref.	6th	
1976–77	4	Reg. Pref.	4th	
1977–78	4	3ª	19th	First Round
1978–79	5	Reg. Pref.	3rd	
1979–80	5	Reg. Pref.	2nd	
1980–81	4	3ª	17th	
1981–82	5	Reg. Pref.	1st	
1982–83	4	3ª	20th	

Season	Tier	Division	Place	Copa del Rey
1983–84	4	3ª	8th	
1984–85	4	3ª	7th	
1985–86	4	3ª	4th	
1986–87	4	3ª	7th	Third round
1987–88	4	3ª	6th	
1988–89	4	3ª	11th	
1989–90	4	3ª	12th	
1990–91	4	3ª	9th	
1991–92	4	3ª	7th	
1992–93	4	3ª	11th	First round
1993–94	4	3ª	18th	
1994–95	5	Reg. Pref.	4th	
1995–96	5	Reg. Pref.	2nd	
1996–97	4	3ª	11th	
1997–98	4	3ª	20th	
1998–99	5	Reg. Pref.	3rd	
1999–2000	5	Reg. Pref.	1st	
2000–01	4	3ª	16th	
2001–02	4	3ª	12th	
2002–03	4	3ª	12th	

Season	Tier	Division	Place	Copa del Rey
2003–04	4	3ª	19th	
2004–05	5	Reg. Pref.	4th	
2005–06	5	Reg. Pref.	5th	
2006–07	5	Reg. Pref.	8th	
2007–08	5	Reg. Pref.	14th	
2008–09	5	Reg. Pref.	8th	
2009–10	5	Reg. Pref.	11th	
2010–11	5	Reg. Pref.	6th	
2011–12	5	Reg. Pref.	5th	
2012–13	5	Reg. Pref.	13th	
2013–14	6	1ª Reg.	4th	
2014–15	5	Reg. Pref.	7th	
2015–16	5	Reg. Pref.	1st	
2016–17	4	3ª	11th	
2017–18	4	3ª	10th	
2018–19	4	3ª	15th	
2019–20	4	3ª	15th	
2020–21	4	3ª	1st / 2nd	
2021–22	4	2ª RFEF	9th	
2022–23	4	2ª Fed.	12th	

Season	Tier	Division	Place	Copa del Rey
2023–24	4	2ª Fed.	18th	
2024–25	5	3ª Fed.	11th	
2025–26	5	3ª Fed.	9th	
2026–27	5	3ª Fed.		

- 3 seasons in Segunda Federación/Segunda División RFEF
- 25 seasons in Tercera División
- 3 seasons in Tercera Federación
