= UD Fuente de Cantos =

Association football team in Spain

Fuente de Cantos
- Full name: Unión Deportiva Fuente de Cantos
- Nickname: UDFDC
- Founded: 16 June 1975; 51 years ago
- Ground: Francisco de Zurbarán, Fuente de Cantos, Badajoz, Extremadura, Spain
- Capacity: 1,500
- President: Ismael Barroso
- Manager: Antonio José Gallego
- League: Primera Extremeña – Group 4
- 2025–26: Primera Extremeña – Group 4, 4th of 14
- Website: https://udfdc.enextremadura.es/
Home colours	Away colours

Unión Deportiva Fuente de Cantos is a football team based in Fuente de Cantos, Badajoz, in the autonomous community of Extremadura. The club play in Primera Extremeña – Group 4, holding home matches at the Estadio Municipal Francisco de Zurbarán, with a capacity of 1,500 people.

== History ==
Football in the city of Fuente de Cantos already existed in the 1950s, with amateur clubs Tigre CF and CD Zurbarán. In 1958, both clubs and another side named Acción Católica merged, originally creating UD Fuente de Cantos. The club started playing youth competitions in the 1960s, but their original foundation date was set in 1975, the year of the club's registration in the Extremaduran Football Federation.

After playing their first eight seasons in the regional leagues, Fuente de Cantos achieved a first-ever promotion to Tercera División in 1983. Relegated in 1989, the club only returned to the division in 2012. Relegated again in 2017, the club returned to Tercera in 2019.

== Season to season ==
Season	Tier	Division	Place	Copa del Rey
1975–76	5	1ª Reg.	12th	
1976–77	5	1ª Reg.	8th	
1977–78	6	1ª Reg.	5th	
1978–79	6	1ª Reg.	9th	
1979–80	6	1ª Reg.	8th	
1980–81	6	1ª Reg.	4th	
1981–82	6	1ª Reg.	1st	
1982–83	5	Reg. Pref.	5th	
1983–84	4	3ª	17th	
1984–85	4	3ª	12th	
1985–86	4	3ª	11th	
1986–87	4	3ª	13th	
1987–88	4	3ª	16th	
1988–89	4	3ª	20th	
1989–90	5	Reg. Pref.	14th	
1990–91	5	Reg. Pref.	10th	
1991–92	5	Reg. Pref.	8th	
1992–93	5	Reg. Pref.	16th	
1993–94	5	Reg. Pref.	3rd	
1994–95	5	Reg. Pref.	13th	

Season	Tier	Division	Place	Copa del Rey
1995–96	5	Reg. Pref.	10th	
1996–97	5	Reg. Pref.	17th	
1997–98	5	Reg. Pref.	14th	
1998–99	5	Reg. Pref.	17th	
1999–2000	5	Reg. Pref.	18th	
2000–01	6	1ª Reg.	1st	
2001–02	5	Reg. Pref.	8th	
2002–03	5	Reg. Pref.	3rd	
2003–04	5	Reg. Pref.	3rd	
2004–05	5	Reg. Pref.	20th	
2005–06	6	1ª Reg.	2nd	
2006–07	5	Reg. Pref.	19th	
2007–08	6	1ª Reg.	4th	
2008–09	6	1ª Reg.	1st	
2009–10	5	Reg. Pref.	6th	
2010–11	5	Reg. Pref.	5th	
2011–12	5	Reg. Pref.	1st	
2012–13	4	3ª	17th	
2013–14	4	3ª	17th	
2014–15	4	3ª	12th	

Season	Tier	Division	Place	Copa del Rey
2015–16	4	3ª	13th	
2016–17	4	3ª	18th	
2017–18	5	1ª Ext.	5th	
2018–19	5	1ª Ext.	1st	
2019–20	4	3ª	17th	
2020–21	4	3ª	11th / 7th	
2021–22	6	1ª Ext.	2nd	
2022–23	5	3ª Fed.	10th	
2023–24	5	3ª Fed.	18th	
2024–25	6	1ª Ext.	2nd	
2025–26	6	1ª Ext.	4th	

- 13 seasons in Tercera División
- 2 seasons in Tercera Federación
