= CP Montehermoso =

Association football team in Spain

Montehermoso
- Full name: Club Polideportivo Montehermoso
- Nickname: Monte
- Founded: 1969
- Ground: Municipal, Montehermoso, Cáceres, Extremadura, Spain
- Capacity: 423 (seated)
- President: Flavio Garrido Quijada
- Manager: Rafael Rus
- League: Primera Extremeña – Group 1
- 2025–26: Tercera Federación – Group 14, 17th of 18 (relegated)
Home colours	Away colours

Club Polideportivo Montehermoso is a football team based in Montehermoso, Cáceres, in the autonomous community of Extremadura. The club play in Primera Extremeña – Group 1, holding home matches at the Complejo Polideportivo Municipal de Montehermoso, with a capacity of 423 seats.

== Season to season ==
Season	Tier	Division	Place	Copa del Rey
1969–70	5	2ª Reg.		
1970–71	5	2ª Reg. P.		
1971–72	5	2ª Reg. P.	8th	
1972–73	6	3ª Reg.		
1973–1977	DNP			
1977–78	6	1ª Reg.	7th	
1978–79	6	1ª Reg.	14th	
1979–80	6	1ª Reg.	6th	
1980–81	6	1ª Reg.	7th	
1981–82	6	1ª Reg.	2nd	
1982–83	6	1ª Reg.	7th	
1983–84	6	1ª Reg.	7th	
1984–85	6	1ª Reg.	4th	
1985–86	6	1ª Reg.	2nd	
1986–87	5	Reg. Pref.	20th	
1987–88	5	Reg. Pref.	10th	
1988–89	5	Reg. Pref.	16th	
1989–90	5	Reg. Pref.	17th	
1990–91	5	Reg. Pref.	8th	
1991–92	5	Reg. Pref.	5th	

Season	Tier	Division	Place	Copa del Rey
1992–93	5	Reg. Pref.	7th	
1993–94	5	Reg. Pref.	17th	
1994–95	DNP			
1995–96	6	1ª Reg.	11th	
1996–97	DNP			
1997–98	6	1ª Reg.	2nd	
1998–99	5	Reg. Pref.	14th	
1999–2000	5	Reg. Pref.	18th	
2000–01	6	1ª Reg.	6th	
2001–2005	DNP			
2005–06	6	1ª Reg.	3rd	
2006–07	6	1ª Reg.	2nd	
2007–08	5	Reg. Pref.	7th	
2008–09	5	Reg. Pref.	2nd	
2009–10	4	3ª	18th	
2010–11	5	Reg. Pref.	8th	
2011–12	5	Reg. Pref.	2nd	
2012–13	5	Reg. Pref.	4th	
2013–14	5	Reg. Pref.	7th	
2014–15	5	Reg. Pref.	11th	

Season	Tier	Division	Place	Copa del Rey
2015–16	5	Reg. Pref.	9th	
2016–17	5	1ª Ext.	2nd	
2017–18	5	1ª Ext.	1st	
2018–19	5	1ª Ext.	2nd	
2019–20	5	1ª Ext.	3rd	
2020–21	5	1ª Ext.	5th	
2021–22	6	1ª Ext.	1st	
2022–23	5	3ª Fed.	12th	
2023–24	5	3ª Fed.	17th	
2024–25	6	1ª Ext.	2nd	
2025–26	5	3ª Fed.	17th	
2026–27	6	1ª Ext.		

- 1 season in Tercera División
- 3 seasons in Tercera Federación
