= Divisiones Regionales de Fútbol in Extremadura =

The Divisiones Regionales de Fútbol in the Community of Extremadura:

- Primera División Extremeña (Level 6 of the Spanish football pyramid)
- Segunda División Extremeña (Level 7)

== League chronology ==
Timeline

== Primera Extremeña ==
Regional Preferente
- Founded: 1924
- Country: Spain
- Number of clubs: Variable (variable groups)
- Level on pyramid: 6
- Promotion to: 3ª Federación – Group 14
- Relegation to: 2ª Extremeña
- Website: Official website

The Primera Extremeña is the sixth level of competition of the Spanish league football in the Autonomous Community of Extremadura. It is organized by Football Federation of Extremadura.

=== League system ===
The Regional Preferente consists of three groups of sixteen clubs each one. Top four teams at final standings play the promotion playoffs. Bottom four teams are relegated.

=== 2022–23 teams ===
==== Group 1 ====
- Amanecer
- Cdad. Plasencia
- Casar
- Cacereño B
- Chinato
- Jaraíz
- Malpartida
- Moraleja
- Moralo CP B
- Puente San Fco.
- Talayuela
- Valdefuentes
- CRC

==== Group 2 ====
- AD Lobón
- Alburquerque
- CD Badajoz B
- CD Guadiana
- CD Gévora
- CF San Jorge
- CP Cheles
- CP Valverdeño
- EF Puebla
- Sanvicenteño
- UD Talavera
- Valdelacalzada

==== Group 3 ====
- Cabeza del Buey
- CD Castuera
- CD Ilipense
- CD Monterrubio
- CD Quintana
- CF Campanario
- CP Guareña
- Gimnástico Don B.
- Hernán Cortés
- Santa Amalia
- Valdehornillos
- R. Mérida City

==== Group 4 ====
- AD Mérida B
- CD San Serván
- CD Usagre
- CP Monesterio
- CP Oliva
- EMD Aceuchal
- EMD Solana
- Gran Maestre
- Higuera CF
- Santa Marta
- SC Garrovilla
- CD Zafra
2012–13 Regional Preferente – Group 1 teams
2012–13 Regional Preferente – Group 2 teams
2012–13 Regional Preferente – Group 3 teams

=== Champions ===
Season	Gr. I	Gr. II	Gr. III	Gr. IV	Gr. V
2013-14	CP Sanvicenteño	CD Badajoz	CP Valdivia	–	–
2014–15	CP Amanecer	EMD Aceuchal	UC La Estrella	–	–
2015–16	UP Plasencia	UD Montijo	UC La Estrella	–	–
2016–17	CF Trujillo	UD Talavera	CD Castuera	–	–
2017–18	CP Montehermoso	AD Lobón	AD Llerenense	–	–
2017–18	CP Montehermoso	AD Lobón	AD Llerenense	–	–
2018–19	CF Trujillo	AD Lobón	UD Fuente de Cantos	–	–
2019–20	CP Chinato	CA Pueblonuevo	UC La Estrella	–	–
2020–21	CF Jaraíz	CD Badajoz B	CP Oliva	CD Valdelacalzada	CP Guareña
2021–22	CP Montehermoso	CA Pueblonuevo	CF Campanario	UD Fuente de Cantos	–
2022–23	CF Jaraíz	Racing Valverdeño	CD Santa Amalia	Sport Club la Garrovilla	–
2023–24	CP Chinato	EF Puebla de la Calzada	CD Santa Amalia	CD Extremadura	–
2024–25	AD Ciudad de Plasencia	CD Gévora	CD Cabeza del Buey	UC La Estrella	–
2025–26	UP Plasencia	CD Guadiana	CD Quintana	CD Zafra	–

== Segunda Extremeña ==
Primera Regional
- Founded: Unknown
- Country: Spain
- Number of clubs: Variable (variable groups)
- Level on pyramid: 7
- Promotion to: 1ª Extremeña
- Relegation to: None
- Website: Official website

The Segunda Extremeña is the seventh level of competition of the Spanish league football in the Autonomous Community of Extremadura. It is organized by Football Federation of Extremadura.

=== League system ===
The Primera Regional is played with four groups of 14 teams. At the end of the season, the champion of each group are promoted to the Regional Preferente. The two winners of the runners-up playoff are also promoted. The Primera Regional de Extremadura is the lowest league in the Spanish league pyramid in Extremadura, so no clubs are relegated.

=== 2022–23 teams ===
==== Group 1 ====
- CD Coria B
- CD Tietar
- CF Jerte
- CF Piornal
- CF Verato
- CP Brocense
- CP Cabezuela
- CP Torreorgaz
- Las Hurdes CF
- Norte Extrem.
- Torrejoncillo
- UD Aceituna

==== Group 2 ====
- AD Hispanolusa
- AD Obandina
- CD Albuera
- CD Alconchel
- CD La Roca
- CP Don Bosco
- Peña El Valle
- Santa Isabel
- S.Fco. Olivenza
- Vnva. del Fresno
- Villar del Rey Ind.
- Valdebotoa

==== Group 3 ====
- Alan. Alange
- Atl. Torremejía
- CD Almoharín
- CD Metelinense
- CD Zarceño
- Don Álvaro B
- Eme. Augusta
- Madr. Olimpia
- Sta. Quiteria
- Trujillanos CF
- Talleres Anglo
- UP Barbaño

==== Group 4 ====
- AD Siruela
- AD Zurbarán
- Athletic Valle
- CD La Haba
- CD Talarrubias
- CD Torviscal
- Esparragosa
- Fuenlab. Montes
- Olympic Peleño
- Orellana Costa D.
- San Bartolomé
- SP Herrera
- Sp. Malpartida

==== Group 5 ====
- Ath. Fregenal
- CD Berlanga
- Corte de Peleas
- CD Extremadura
- CP Belenense
- EMD Aceuchal B
- Hernando de Soto
- SP Ribereña
- SP Villafranca B
- UD Bienvenida
- UD Fornacense
- UP Segureña
