= Moisés Pereiro =

Spanish footballer

Personal information
- Full name: Moisés Pereiro Pérez
- Date of birth: 24 February 1980 (age 46)
- Place of birth: Ourense, Spain
- Height: 1.80 m (5 ft 11 in)
- Position: Midfielder

Team information
- Current team: Galicia Mugardos (manager)

Youth career
- Barcelona

Senior career*
Years	Team	Apps	(Gls)
1999–2001	Barcelona C	30	(3)
2000–2004	Barcelona B	72	(3)
2004–2007	Racing Ferrol	52	(0)
2007–2008	Zamora	9	(0)
2008–2009	Ourense		
2009–2012	Montañeros	99	(1)
2012–2013	Pontevedra	30	(1)
2013–2016	Barbadás	86	(30)
Total		378	(38)

International career
1997	Spain U18	3	(0)
1998	Spain U20	4	(1)

Managerial career
- 2017–2018: Barbadás
- 2018–2019: Antela
- 2019–2020: Atlético Coruña Montañeros
- 2025–: Galicia Mugardos
- * Club domestic league appearances and goals

Moisés Pereiro Pérez (born 24 February 1980 in Ourense, Galicia) is a Spanish retired footballer who played as a midfielder, and is the manager of SDC Galicia de Mugardos.
