= Yago Yao =

Equatoguinean football manager (b. 1979)

Personal information
- Full name: Yago Yao Alonso Fueyo Sako
- Date of birth: 19 August 1979 (age 47)
- Place of birth: Abidjan, Ivory Coast
- Height: 1.82 m (6 ft 0 in)
- Position: Centre back

Youth career
- San Claudio
- 1996–1997: Sporting Gijón

Senior career*
Years	Team	Apps	(Gls)
1997–1999	Sporting Gijón B	67	(2)
1998–2000	Sporting Gijón	37	(0)
2000–2002	Celta	30	(0)
2002	Recreativo	7	(0)
2003	Oviedo	19	(1)
2003–2004	Sporting Gijón	37	(1)
2004–2007	Celta	13	(1)
2007–2008	Cádiz	7	(0)
2008–2009	Levante	16	(0)
2010	Montañeros	7	(0)
2010–2014	Coruxo	129	(7)
2014–2015	Rápido Bouzas	21	(1)
Total		390	(13)

International career
1998	Spain U18	1	(0)
2007–2011	Equatorial Guinea	7	(0)
2007	Equatorial Guinea B	3	(0)

Managerial career
- 2017–2020: Cultural Areas
- 2020–2021: Atios
- 2021–2022: Ribadumia
- 2024–: Cultural Areas
- * Club domestic league appearances and goals

Yago Yao Alonso Fueyo Sako (born 19 August 1979), known as Yago Yao, is a football manager and former professional player who played as a central defender.

Yago Yao spent his entire 18-year senior career in Spain, amassing a combined La Liga totals of 43 matches and one goal for Celta (two spells) and Recreativo. He added 123 games in the Segunda División, with Celta as well as four other clubs.

Born in Ivory Coast, Yago Yao represented Spain at under-18 level and Equatorial Guinea at senior level.

== Early life ==
Yago Yao was born in Abidjan, Ivory Coast to an Ivorian mother and a Spanish father. Six hours after his birth he was taxed as Spanish and, three months later, he was taken to live in Asturias where his paternal grandfather was from.

== Club career ==
Yago Yao played solely in Spain during his career, representing Sporting de Gijón (two stints), RC Celta de Vigo (two, being severely injured early into his second), Recreativo de Huelva, Real Oviedo, Cádiz and Levante UD. In 2000–01 he appeared in 20 games in La Liga as the Galicians finished sixth, but split the 2002–03 season with two teams that met the same fate, relegation (Recre and Oviedo, one in each of the major levels of Spanish football).

After unsuccessful trials at both Aris Thessaloniki and Hamilton Academical, Yago Yao returned to Spain in January 2010, signing with modest Montañeros in Galicia.

== International career ==
According Yago Yao, his maternal grandmother was from what is now known as Equatorial Guinea. He possessed dual nationality, and went on to represent the Equatorial Guinea national team, his first cap coming in 2007 at age 28 against Cameroon. He previously appeared for Spain at youth level.

In December 2007, Yago Yao played B matches against the Region of Murcia and Extremadura.
