= Tomino =

Tomino or Tomiño may refer to:

== Places ==
- Tomino, Haute-Corse, a commune in Corsica, France
- Tomino Station, a railway station in Date, Fukushima, Japan
- Tomiño, a municipality in Pontevedra, Galicia, Spain
  - Tomiño FC, a football club in the municipality

== People ==
- Yoshiyuki Tomino (born 1941), Japanese anime writer and director
- Joe Tomino, drummer in the band Dub Trio
- tomino_music (born 2009), Czech Music Artist

== See also ==
- Tamino (disambiguation)
