= 2004 Tercera División play-offs =

Spanish football league play-offs

The 2004 Tercera División play-offs to Segunda División B from Tercera División (Promotion play-offs) were the final playoffs for the promotion from 2003–04 Tercera División to 2004–05 Segunda División B. The first four teams in each group (excluding reserve teams) took part in the competition.

== Groups A ==
- Teams from Galicia, Asturias, Castile and Leon and Madrid.

Teams - Group 1 (Galicia)	Pts
Cerceda	76
Atlético Arteixo	73
Deportivo de la Coruña B	71
Verín	68

Teams - Group 2 (Asturias)	Pts
Real Oviedo	90
Oviedo ACF	80
Sporting de Gijón B	78
Marino de Luanco	69

Teams - Group 7 (Community of Madrid)	Pts
CD Móstoles	71
SAD Pegaso	68
Atlético Pinto	68
CDA Navalcarnero	66

Teams - Group 8 (Castile and Leon)	Pts
Gimnástica Segoviana	78
Norma San Leonardo	73
Guijuelo	69
Real Ávila	68

=== Group A1 ===
- 1st Eliminatory:

June 6, 2004 Home Matches:
Navalcarnero	1-0	Cerceda
Sporting B	1-0	Norma San Leonardo

June 12, 2004 Away Matches:
Cerceda	0-0	Navalcarnero	Agg:0-1
Norma San Leonardo	5-1	Sporting B	Agg:6-1

- 2nd Eliminatory:

June 20, 2004 Home Matches:
Navalcarnero	1-0	Norma San Leonardo

June 26, 2004 Away Match:
Norma San Leonardo	2-1	Navalcarnero	Agg:2-2

  - Promoted to Segunda División B:Navalcarnero

=== Group A2 ===
- 1st Eliminatory:

June 5, 2004 Home Matches:
Real Ávila	1-2	Real Oviedo
Atletico Pinto	0-0	Atlético Arteixo

June 13, 2004 Away Matches:
Real Oviedo	2-1	Real Ávila	Agg:3-3
Atlético Arteixo (aet)	2-0	Atletico Pinto	Agg:2-0

- 2nd Eliminatory:

June 19, 2004 Home Matches:
Atlético Arteixo	1-0	Real Oviedo

June 26, 2004 Away Match:
Real Oviedo	3-2	Atlético Arteixo	Agg:3-3

  - Promoted to Segunda División B:Atlético Arteixo

=== Group A3 ===
- 1st Eliminatory:

June 4, 2004 Home Matches:
Marino de Luanco	0-1	Gimnástica Segoviana
Deportivo B	0-0	SAD Pegaso

June 13, 2004 Away Matches:
Gimnástica Segoviana	1-3	Marino de Luanco	Agg:2-3
SAD Pegaso	3-0	Deportivo B	Agg:3-0

- 2nd Eliminatory:

June 20, 2004 Home Matches:
Marino de Luanco	0-0	SAD Pegaso

June 27, 2004 Away Match:
SAD Pegaso	2-2	Marino de Luanco	Agg:2-2

  - Promoted to Segunda División B:Marino de Luanco

=== Group A4 ===
- 1st Eliminatory:

June 6, 2004 Home Matches:
Verín CF	1-3	Móstoles
Guijuelo	2-1	Oviedo ACF

June 13, 2004 Away Matches:
Móstoles	4-0	Verín CF	Agg:7-1
Oviedo ACF	2-1	Guijuelo (p.)	Agg:3-3

- 2nd Eliminatory:

June 20, 2004 Home Matches:
Guijuelo	1-1	Móstoles

June 27, 2004 Away Match:
Móstoles	1-3	Guijuelo	Agg:2-4

  - Promoted to Segunda División B:Guijuelo

== Groups B ==
- Teams from Cantabria, Basque Country, La Rioja/Navarre and Aragon.

Teams - Group 3 (Cantabria)	Pts
SD Noja	78
CD Tropezón	76
CD Bezana	70
Velarde CF	66

Teams - Group 4 (Basque Country)	Pts
Sestao River C	78
SD Lemona	76
SD Éibar B	70
CF Portugalete	69

Teams - Group 15 (La Rioja) and (Navarre)	Pts
CM Peralta	96
CD Valle de Egüés	74
UCD Burladés	72
Haro Deportivo	70

Teams - Group 16 (Aragon)	Pts
Utebo CF	87
CD Binéfar	76
Andorra CF	73
SD Huesca	73

=== Group B1 ===
- 1st Eliminatory:

June 6, 2004 Home Matches:
Huesca	2-0	Noja
Eibar B	2-1	Valle de Egüés

June 13, 2004 Away Matches:
Noja	1-0	Huesca	Agg:1-2
Valle de Egüés	0-0	Eibar B	Agg:1-2

- 2nd Eliminatory:

June 20, 2004 Home Matches:
Huesca	1-0	Eibar B

June 27, 2004 Away Match:
Eibar B	1-2	Huesca	Agg:1-3

  - Promoted to Segunda División B:Huesca

=== Group B2 ===
- 1st Eliminatory:

June 6, 2004 Home Matches:
Haro Dep.	1-1	Sestao RC
Andorra CF	1-0	Tropezón

June 13, 2004 Away Matches:
Sestao RC	1-0	Haro Dep.	Agg:2-1
Tropezón (p.)	1-0	Andorra CF	Agg:1-1

- 2nd Eliminatory:

June 19, 2004 Home Matches:
Tropezón	0-1	Sestao RC

June 26, 2004 Away Match:
Sestao RC	1-1	Tropezón	Agg:2-1

  - Promoted to Segunda División B:Sestao River Club

=== Group B3 ===
- 1st Eliminatory:

June 6, 2004 Home Matches:
Portugalete	1-0	Peralta
CD Bezana	1-1	CD Binéfar

June 13, 2004 Away Matches:
Peralta	5-3	Portugalete	Agg:5-4
CD Binéfar (aet)	4-2	CD Bezana	Agg:5-3

- 2nd Eliminatory:

June 20, 2004 Home Matches:
CD Binéfar	1-2	Peralta

June 27, 2004 Away Match:
Peralta	1-1	CD Binéfar	Agg:3-2

  - Promoted to Segunda División B:Peralta

=== Group B4 ===
- 1st Eliminatory:

June 5, 2004 Home Matches:
Velarde CF	1-2	Utebo
Burladés	2-1	Lemona

June 12 and June 13, 2004 Away Matches:
Utebo	1-1	Velarde CF	Agg:3-1
Lemona	3-0	Burladés	Agg:4-2

- 2nd Eliminatory:

June 20, 2004 Home Matches:
Lemona	3-0	Utebo

June 27, 2004 Away Match:
Utebo	0-1	Lemona	Agg:0-4

  - Promoted to Segunda División B:Lemona

== Groups C ==
- Teams from Catalonia, Valencian Community, Balearic Islands and Region of Murcia.

Teams - Group 5 (Catalonia)	Pts
CF Badalona	73
CF Reus Deportiu	71
CD L'Hospitalet	69
EC Granollers	68

Teams - Group 6 (Valencian Community)	Pts
Benidorm CD	71
CD Alcoyano	67
Villarreal CF B	65
Levante UD B	64

Teams - Group 11 (Balearic Islands)	Pts
PD Santa Eulalia	73
CD Santanyí	67
UD Poblense	66
CF Villafranca	66

Teams - Group 13 (Region of Murcia)	Pts
AD Mar Menor-San Javier	90
Mazarrón CF	77
UD Horadada	77
Caravaca CF	77

=== Group C1 ===
- 1st Eliminatory:

June 5 and June 6, 2004 Home Matches:
Caravaca	0-0	Badalona
Villarreal B	1-0	Santanyí

June 12 and June 13, 2005 Away Matches:
Badalona	4-1	Caravaca	Agg:4-1
Santanyí	1-1	Villarreal B	Agg:1-2

- 2nd Eliminatory:

June 19, 2004 Home Matches:
Villarreal B	1-1	Badalona

June 27, 2004 Away Match:
Badalona	3-2	Villarreal B	Agg:4-3

  - Promoted to Segunda División B:Badalona

=== Group C2 ===
- 1st Eliminatory:

June 6, 2004 Home Matches:
Villafranca	1-2	Benidorm
Horadada	3-2	Reus

June 13, 2004 Away Matches:
Benidorm	4-0	Villafranca	Agg:6-1
Reus	1-3	Horadada	Agg:6-3

- 2nd Eliminatory:

June 20, 2004 Home Matches:
Horadada	3-1	Benidorm

June 27, 2004 Away Match:
Benidorm	2-0	Horadada	Agg:3-3

  - Promoted to Segunda División B:Benidorm

=== Group C3 ===
- 1st Eliminatory:

June 6, 2004 Home Matches:
Levante B	1-0	Santa Eulàlia
L'Hospitalet	1-0	Mazarrón

June 13, 2004 Away Matches:
Santa Eulàlia	0-2	Levante B	Agg:0-3
Mazarrón	0-0	L'Hospitalet	Agg:0-1

- 2nd Eliminatory:

June 20, 2004 Home Matches:
Levante B	0-1	L'Hospitalet

June 27, 2004 Away Match:
Levante B (p.)	1-0	L'Hospitalet	Agg:1-1

  - Promoted to Segunda División B:Levante B

=== Group C4 ===
- 1st Eliminatory:

June 6, 2004 Home Matches:
Granollers	1-2	Mar Menor
Poblense	0-2	Alcoyano

June 12 and June 13, 2004 Away Matches:
Mar Menor	3-1	Granollers	Agg:5-2
Alcoyano	3-1	Poblense	Agg:5-1

- 2nd Eliminatory:

June 20, 2004 Home Matches:
Alcoyano	2-0	Mar Menor

June 27, 2004 Away Match:
Mar Menor	0-0	Alcoyano	Agg:0-2

  - Promoted to Segunda División B:Alcoyano

== Groups D ==
- Teams from Andalusia, Extremadura, and Castile-La Mancha.

Teams - Group 9 (East Andalusia)	Pts
Granada CF	78
Motril CF	77
CP Granada 74	74
Arenas de Armilla CD	74

Teams - Group 10 (West Andalusia)	Pts
CD Alcalá de Guadaira	70
Bollullos CF	67
Balompédica Linense	67
CD San Fernando	66

Teams - Group 14 (Extremadura)	Pts
CD Don Benito	87
CD Díter Zafra	78
AD Cerro Reyes	77
UP Plasencia	75

Teams - Group 17 (Castile-La Mancha)	Pts
CD Quintanar del Rey	72
UD Puertollano	72
Hellín Deportivo	71
La Roda CF	71

=== Group D1 ===
- 1st Eliminatory:

June 6, 2004 Home Matches:
La Roda	1-0	Granada
Balompédica Linense	1-1	Díter Zafra

June 13, 2004 Away Matches:
Granada	3-2	La Roda	Agg:3-3
Díter Zafra	2-1'	Balompédica Linense	Agg:3-2

- 2nd Eliminatory:

June 20, 2004 Home Matches:
La Roda	0-0	Díter Zafra

June 27, 2004 Away Match:
Díter Zafra	1-0	La Roda	Agg:1-0

  - Promoted to Segunda División B:Díter Zafra

=== Group D2 ===
- 1st Eliminatory:

June 6, 2004 Home Matches:
Plasencia	0-4	CD Alcalá
Hellín	3-0	Motril

June 13, 2004 Away Matches:
CD Alcalá	4-0	Plasencia	Agg:8-0
Motril	0-1	Hellín	Agg:0-4

- 2nd Eliminatory:

June 20, 2004 Home Matches:
Hellín	1-1	CD Alcalá

June 27, 2004 Away Match:
CD Alcalá	3-0	Hellín	Agg:4-1

  - Promoted to Segunda División B:CD Alcalá

=== Group D3 ===
- 1st Eliminatory:

June 6, 2004 Home Matches:
San Fernando	1-1	Don Benito
Granada 74	2-0	Puertollano

June 13, 2004 Away Matches:
Don Benito	1-0	San Fernando	Agg:2-1
Puertollano	1-0	Granada 74	Agg:2-1

- 2nd Eliminatory:

June 20, 2004 Home Matches:
Granada 74	2-1	Don Benito

June 27, 2004 Away Match:
Don Benito	5-0	Granada 74	Agg:6-2

  - Promoted to Segunda División B:Don Benito

=== Group D4 ===
- 1st Eliminatory:

June 6, 2004 Home Matches:
Arenas	2-1	Quintanar del Rey
Cerro Reyes	2-0	Bollullos

June 13, 2004 Away Matches:
Quintanar del Rey	0-1	Arenas	Agg:1-3
Bollullos	1-0	Cerro Reyes	Agg:1-2

- 2nd Eliminatory:

June 20, 2004 Home Matches:
Arenas	1-1	Cerro Reyes

June 26, 2005 Away Match:
Cerro Reyes	1-2	Arenas	Agg:2-3

  - Promoted to Segunda División B:Arenas

== Group E ==
- Teams from Canary Islands.

Teams - Group 12 (Canary Islands)	Pts
Castillo CF	73
CD Villa Santa Brígida	70
AD Laguna	68
SD Tenisca 75	74

- 1st Eliminatory:

June 6, 2004 Home Matches:
Tenisca	1-2	Castillo
Laguna	0-0	Santa Brígida

June 13, 2004 Away Matches:
Castillo	1-0	Tenisca	Agg:3-1
Santa Brígida	1-0	Laguna	Agg:1-0

- 2nd Eliminatory:

June 20, 2004 Home Matches:
Santa Brígida	0-2	Castillo

June 26, 2005 Away Match:
Castillo	2-2	Santa Brígida	Agg:4-2

  - Promoted to Segunda División B:Castillo
- Promotion to a Segunda 'B':

Navalcarnero, At. Arteixo, Marino, Guijuelo, Huesca, Sestao River, Peralta, Lemona, Badalona, Benidorm, Levante B, Alcoyano, Díter Zafra, Alcalá G., Don Benito, Arenas & Castillo

== Promotion/relegation playoff La Rioja ==
Team 1	Agg.	Team 2	1st leg	2nd leg
Berceo	2–1	Alberite	2–1	0–0

- Promotion to Tercera: Berceo
- Relegation to Regional: Alberite
