= Rubi (footballer) =

Spanish footballer and manager

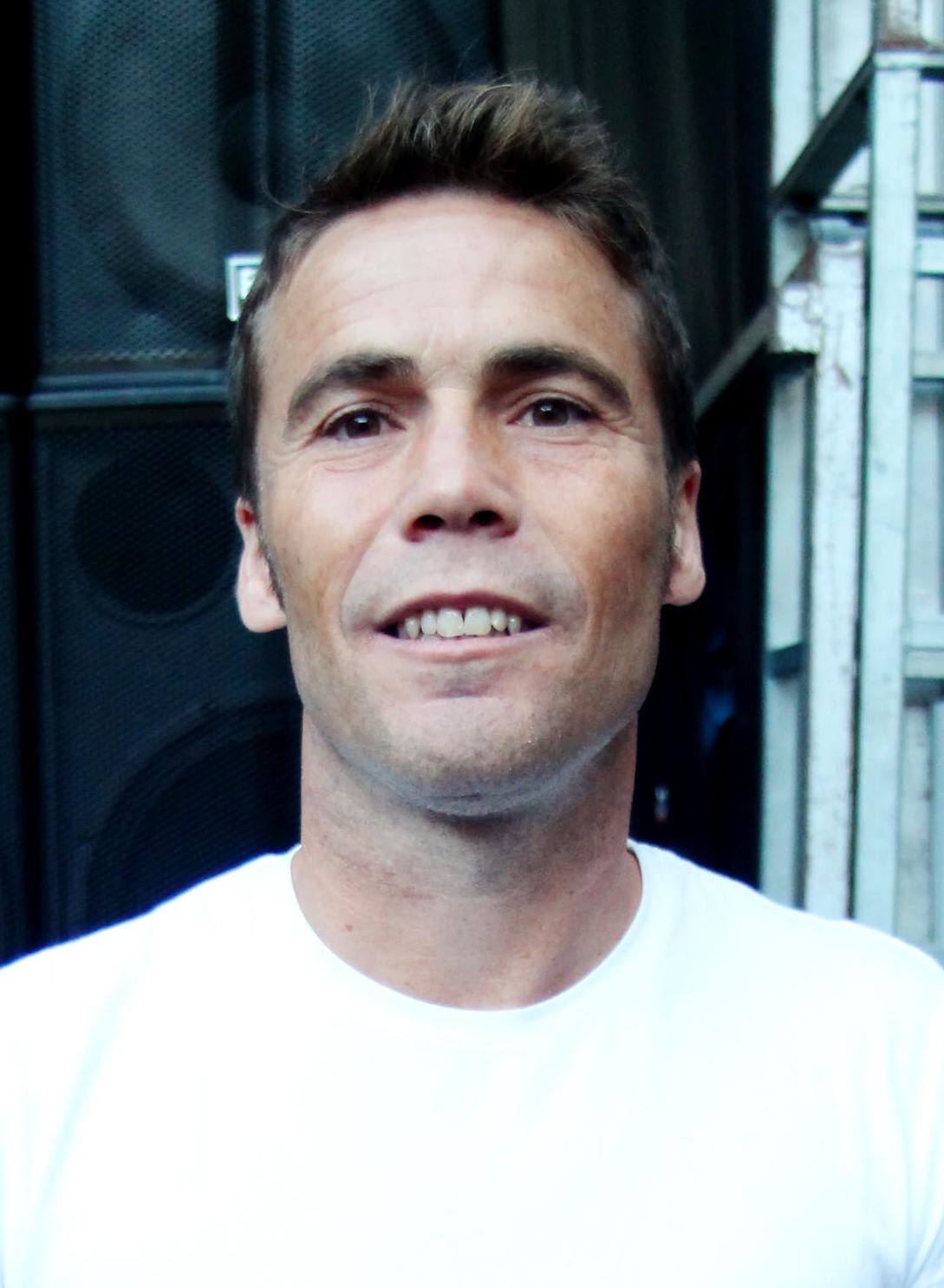
- Rubi in 2014

Personal information
- Full name: Joan Francesc Ferrer Sicilia
- Date of birth: 1 January 1970 (age 56)
- Place of birth: Vilassar de Mar, Spain
- Height: 1.70 m (5 ft 7 in)
- Position: Winger

Youth career
- Vilassar Mar

Senior career*
Years	Team	Apps	(Gls)
1989–1992	Vilassar Mar		
1992–1994	Manlleu	76	(9)
1994–1995	Espanyol B	34	(14)
1995–1996	Hospitalet	38	(9)
1996–1997	Pontevedra	30	(1)
1997–1998	Terrassa	36	(4)
1998–1999	Vilassar Mar	33	(15)
Total		214	(37)

Managerial career
- 2001–2003: Vilassar Mar
- 2003–2004: Hospitalet
- 2004–2005: Sabadell
- 2005–2008: Espanyol B
- 2008: Ibiza-Eivissa
- 2009–2010: Benidorm
- 2012–2013: Girona
- 2014–2015: Valladolid
- 2015–2016: Levante
- 2017: Sporting Gijón
- 2017–2018: Huesca
- 2018–2019: Espanyol
- 2019–2020: Betis
- 2021–2023: Almería
- 2024–2026: Almería
- * Club domestic league appearances and goals

Joan Francesc Ferrer Sicilia (born 1 January 1970), commonly known as Rubi, is a Spanish former footballer who played as a winger. He is currently a manager.

After a playing career spent mainly in the Segunda División B and the Tercera División, he embarked on a managerial career of over two decades, leading Levante, Sporting de Gijón, Espanyol, Betis and Almería in La Liga.

== Playing career ==
Born in Vilassar de Mar, Barcelona, Catalonia, Rubi never competed in higher than the Segunda División B during a ten-year senior career. He started out at local club Vilassar de Mar in 1989.

Rubi appeared in the promotion playoffs to Segunda División with both Manlleu and Terrassa, falling short on both occasions. Whilst with the former, he scored in a 3–3 away draw against Extremadura on 29 May 1994, but the team eventually finished in second position in their group.

== Coaching career ==
Rubi began working as a coach with Vilassar de Mar, and subsequently was in charge of several Tercera División sides in his native region. With L'Hospitalet, he lost the 2004 promotion play-off final on penalties to Atlético Levante. His first experience in the third division was at Sabadell, being dismissed on 2 March 2005 while two points inside the relegation zone; he was promoted to that level with Espanyol B, a year later.

After a short stint with Ibiza-Eivissa, Rubi was appointed at Benidorm. He left the club in the end of the campaign, after achieving a sixth-place finish in the third tier.

On 8 June 2012, Rubi signed with Girona after having been part of the staff in previous years. He took the team to the best season of their history, leading them to the fourth position in division two and being eventually knocked out in the play-offs.

Rubi left Girona and joined Barcelona on 28 June 2013, being added to Tito Vilanova's staff. On 3 June of the following year, he replaced dismissed Juan Ignacio Martínez at the helm of Real Valladolid.

After failing to win promotion to La Liga in the 2015 Segunda División play-offs, Rubi was replaced by Gaizka Garitano on 6 July 2015. On 28 October, he was appointed as manager of Levante, taking over from the sacked Lucas Alcaraz. On his debut three days later, the team lost 3–0 at city rivals Valencia. He only managed to collect seven wins until the end of the season, the side returned to the second tier after a six-year stay and he was relieved of his duties on 26 May 2016.

Rubi took over at Sporting de Gijón on 18 January 2017, in the place of Abelardo. In June, following their relegation, he was hired at Huesca.

On 25 May 2018, after leading the Aragonese side to their first-ever promotion to the first division, Rubi announced he would leave at the end of the campaign. He returned to Espanyol on 3 June, being appointed manager of the first team also in the top flight.

On 6 June 2019, Rubi left Espanyol after paying his release clause, and was appointed Real Betis manager just hours later. He was dismissed on 21 June of the following year, with the club eight points above the relegation zone with as many games left to play.

Rubi signed a two-and-a-half-year contract with Almería on 28 April 2021, replacing José Gomes even though the team was placed third with six matches to go. He won the league in his first full season, thus returning to the top tier after seven years.

Almería survived on the final day of the 2022–23 campaign with a 3–3 draw at already relegated Espanyol, putting another of Rubi's former sides, Valladolid, into the second division at their expense. He subsequently left at the end of his contract.

On 3 June 2024, Rubi returned to the Power Horse Stadium on a three-year deal, following relegation the previous season. Two years later, after two consecutive play-off eliminations, he left.

== Managerial statistics ==
As of match updated 20 June 2026

Managerial record by team and tenure
Team	Nat	From	To	Record								Ref
Team	Nat	From	To	G	W	D	L	GF	GA	GD	Win %	Ref
Vilassar de Mar	(Spain)	8 June 2001	30 June 2003	76	31	16	29	136	134	+2	40.79	
Hospitalet	(Spain)	30 June 2003	1 July 2004	42	23	7	12	66	48	+18	54.76	
Sabadell	(Spain)	1 July 2004	28 February 2005	25	6	10	9	27	36	−9	24.00	
Espanyol B	(Spain)	1 July 2005	10 March 2008	114	49	31	34	189	129	+60	42.98	
Ibiza-Eivissa	(Spain)	1 July 2008	3 November 2008	11	2	3	6	15	23	−8	18.18	
Benidorm	(Spain)	11 June 2009	1 July 2010	38	18	10	10	68	51	+17	47.37	
Girona	(Spain)	8 June 2012	28 June 2013	47	22	9	16	78	64	+14	46.81	
Valladolid	(Spain)	3 June 2014	6 July 2015	48	23	12	13	71	43	+28	47.92	
Levante	(Spain)	28 October 2015	26 May 2016	31	7	6	18	33	54	−21	22.58	
Sporting Gijón	(Spain)	17 January 2017	10 June 2017	20	4	7	9	23	35	−12	20.00	
Huesca	(Spain)	23 June 2017	3 June 2018	43	21	12	10	61	42	+19	48.84	
Espanyol	(Spain)	3 June 2018	6 June 2019	44	16	13	15	57	59	−2	36.36	
Betis	(Spain)	6 June 2019	21 June 2020	33	10	11	12	49	50	−1	30.30	
Almería	(Spain)	28 April 2021	5 June 2023	92	39	21	32	131	116	+15	42.39	
Almería	(Spain)	3 June 2024	30 June 2026	96	46	23	27	173	133	+40	47.92	
Career total				760	317	191	252	1,177	1,017	+160	41.71	—

== Honours ==
Almería

- Segunda División: 2021–22

Individual

- Miguel Muñoz Trophy (Segunda División): 2017–18
