= Santiago Castro =

Santiago Castro may refer to:

- Santiago Castro (footballer, born 1947), Spanish football manager and former midfielder
- Santiago Castro-Gómez (born 1958), Colombian philosopher and professor
- Santiago Castro (footballer, born 2004), Argentine football forward
