= UD Paiosaco =

Association football club in Spain

Paiosaco
- Full name: Unión Deportiva Paiosaco Hierros Añón
- Nickname: Los verdes
- Founded: 1961; 65 years ago
- Stadium: Campo Porta Santa, Galicia
- Capacity: 2,000
- President: Carlos García Rodo
- Head coach: Iván Sánchez Lamas
- League: Preferente Futgal – Group 1
- 2025–26: Preferente Futgal – Group 1, 7th of 18
- Website: udpaiosaco.com
Home colours	Away colours

Unión Deportiva Paiosaco Hierros Añón (UD Paiosaco) is a Spanish football team located in A Laracha in the province of A Coruña, in the autonomous community of Galicia. Founded in 1961, it currently plays in Preferente Futgal – Group 1, holding home matches at Campo Porta Santa with a capacity of 2,000 spectators.

== History ==
UD Paiosaco was founded in 1961.

== Season to season ==
Season	Tier	Division	Place	Copa del Rey
1961–62	5	1ª Reg.	1st	
1962–63	5	1ª Reg.	1st	
1963–64	5	1ª Reg.	2nd	
1964–65	5	1ª Reg.	1st	
1965–66	5	1ª Reg.	3rd	
1966–67	5	1ª Reg.	4th	
1967–68	5	1ª Reg.	6th	
1968–69	5	1ª Reg.	1st	
1969–70	5	1ª Reg.	2nd	
1970–71	5	1ª Reg.		
1971–72	6	2ª Reg.	1st	
1972–73	6	2ª Reg.	1st	
1973–74	6	2ª Reg.	2nd	
1974–75	5	1ª Reg.	2nd	
1975–76	5	1ª Reg.	1st	
1976–77	5	1ª Reg.	1st	
1977–78	6	1ª Reg.	3rd	
1978–79	7	2ª Reg.	2nd	
1979–80	7	2ª Reg.	2nd	
1980–81	7	2ª Reg.	13th	

Season	Tier	Division	Place	Copa del Rey
1981–82	7	2ª Reg.	1st	
1982–83	6	1ª Reg.	3rd	
1983–84	6	1ª Reg.	1st	
1984–85	5	Reg. Pref.	11th	
1985–86	5	Reg. Pref.	11th	
1986–87	5	Reg. Pref.	18th	
1987–88	5	Reg. Pref.	18th	
1988–89	6	1ª Reg.	9th	
1989–90	6	1ª Reg.	11th	
1990–91	6	1ª Reg.	17th	
1991–92	7	2ª Reg.	1st	
1992–93	6	1ª Reg.	6th	
1993–94	6	1ª Reg.	7th	
1994–95	6	1ª Reg.	9th	
1995–96	6	1ª Reg.	13th	
1996–97	6	1ª Reg.	5th	
1997–98	6	1ª Reg.	10th	
1998–99	6	1ª Reg.	18th	
1999–2000	6	1ª Reg.	17th	
2000–01	7	2ª Reg.	1st	

Season	Tier	Division	Place	Copa del Rey
2001–02	6	1ª Reg.	2nd	
2002–03	5	Reg. Pref.	16th	
2003–04	6	1ª Reg.	11th	
2004–05	6	1ª Reg.	4th	
2005–06	6	1ª Reg.	6th	
2006–07	6	1ª Aut.	12th	
2007–08	6	1ª Aut.	16th	
2008–09	7	2ª Aut.	10th	
2009–10	7	2ª Aut.	3rd	
2010–11	7	2ª Aut.	5th	
2011–12	7	2ª Aut.	9th	
2012–13	7	2ª Aut.	1st	
2013–14	6	1ª Aut.	3rd	
2014–15	6	1ª Aut.	1st	
2015–16	5	Pref.	6th	
2016–17	5	Pref.	5th	
2017–18	5	Pref.	2nd	
2018–19	4	3ª	15th	
2019–20	4	3ª	20th	
2020–21	4	3ª	12th / 10th	

Season	Tier	Division	Place	Copa del Rey
2021–22	6	Pref.	3rd	
2022–23	5	3ª Fed.	11th	
2023–24	5	3ª Fed.	16th	
2024–25	6	Pref. Futgal	7th	
2025–26	6	Pref. Futgal		

- 3 seasons in Tercera División
- 2 seasons in Tercera Federación
