= SDC Órdenes =

Spanish football club

Órdenes
- Full name: Sociedad Deportiva Club Órdenes
- Founded: 1953; 73 years ago
- Stadium: Estadio Vista Alegre
- Capacity: 3,000
- President: Antonio Enrique Vázquez Rendal
- Head coach: Pery López
- League: Preferente Futgal – Group 1
- 2025–26: Preferente Futgal – Group 1, 5th of 18
Home colours	Away colours

Sociedad Deportiva Club Órdenes is a Spanish football team based in Ordes, in the autonomous community of Galicia. Founded in 1953 it plays in Preferente Futgal – Group 1, holding home games at Estadio Vista Alegre, which has a capacity of 3,000 spectators.

== Season to season ==
Season	Tier	Division	Place	Copa del Rey
1953–54	4	Serie A	7th	
1954–55	4	Serie A	2nd	
1955–56	4	Serie A	1st	
1956–57	3	3ª	13th	
1957–58	3	3ª	10th	
1958–59	3	3ª	5th	
1959–60	3	3ª	12th	
1960–61	3	3ª	15th	
1961–62	4	Serie A	3rd	
1962–63	4	Serie A	6th	
1963–64	4	Serie A	6th	
1964–65	4	Serie A	5th	
1965–66	4	Serie A	5th	
1966–67	4	Serie A	2nd	
1967–68	3	3ª	15th	
1968–69	4	Serie A	7th	
1969–70	4	Serie A	7th	
1970–71	4	Serie A	15th	
1971–72	4	Serie A	15th	
1972–73	4	Serie A	19th	

Season	Tier	Division	Place	Copa del Rey
1973–74	5	1ª Reg.	3rd	
1974–75	5	1ª Reg.	12th	
1975–76	6	2ª Reg.	2nd	
1976–77	5	1ª Reg.	8th	
1977–78	6	1ª Reg.	1st	
1978–79	6	1ª Reg.	11th	
1979–80	6	1ª Reg.	11th	
1980–81	6	1ª Reg.	20th	
1981–82	6	1ª Reg.	18th	
1982–83	6	1ª Reg.	10th	
1983–84	6	1ª Reg.	3rd	
1984–85	6	1ª Reg.	2nd	
1985–86	6	1ª Reg.	3rd	
1986–87	5	Reg. Pref.	6th	
1987–88	5	Reg. Pref.	3rd	
1988–89	5	Reg. Pref.	1st	
1989–90	4	3ª	10th	
1990–91	4	3ª	13th	
1991–92	4	3ª	8th	
1992–93	4	3ª	7th	

Season	Tier	Division	Place	Copa del Rey
1993–94	4	3ª	14th	First round
1994–95	4	3ª	20th	
1995–96	5	Reg. Pref.	5th	
1996–97	5	Reg. Pref.	12th	
1997–98	5	Reg. Pref.	16th	
1998–99	6	1ª Reg.	9th	
1999–2000	6	1ª Reg.	1st	
2000–01	5	Reg. Pref.	14th	
2001–02	5	Reg. Pref.	9th	
2002–03	5	Reg. Pref.	11th	
2003–04	5	Reg. Pref.	14th	
2004–05	5	Reg. Pref.	4th	
2005–06	5	Reg. Pref.	1st	
2006–07	4	3ª	5th	
2007–08	4	3ª	10th	
2008–09	4	3ª	13th	
2009–10	4	3ª	7th	
2010–11	4	3ª	7th	
2011–12	4	3ª	12th	
2012–13	4	3ª	7th	

Season	Tier	Division	Place	Copa del Rey
2013–14	4	3ª	8th	
2014–15	4	3ª	12th	
2015–16	4	3ª	15th	
2016–17	4	3ª	20th	
2017–18	5	Pref.	13th	
2018–19	5	Pref.	17th	
2019–20	6	1ª Gal.	3rd	
2020–21	DNP			
2021–22	7	1ª Gal.	1st	
2022–23	6	Pref.	17th	
2023–24	7	1ª Gal.	3rd	
2024–25	6	Pref. Futgal	13th	
2025–26	6	Pref. Futgal		

- 23 seasons in Tercera División

== Notable players ==
- (Canada) Manny Aparicio
- (Slovenia) Dejan Djermanović
