= Tamino =

Tamino may refer to:

- Tamino (musician), Belgian-Egyptian singer, musician and model
- Tamino (The Magic Flute), a principal (and flute-blowing) character in the opera The Magic Flute (Die Zauberflöte) by Wolfgang Amadeus Mozart
- Tamino Information Server, an XML-based database management product from Software AG

== See also ==
- Tomino (disambiguation)
