= CD Brollón =

Spanish football club

Brollón
- Full name: Club Deportivo Brollón
- Founded: 1991; 35 years ago
- Stadium: Campo Municipal Os Medos
- Capacity: 1,000
- President: Ramón Quiroga
- Head coach: Diego Rey
- League: Primera Futgal – Group 3
- 2025–26: Primera Futgal – Group 4, 14th of 18
Home colours

Club Deportivo Brollón is a Spanish football team based in A Pobra do Brollón, in the autonomous community of Galicia. Founded in 1991, it plays in Primera Futgal – Group 3, holding home matches at Campo Municipal Os Medos.

== Season to season ==
| Season | Tier | Division | Place | Copa del Rey |
|---|---|---|---|---|
| 1991–92 | 7 | 2ª Reg. | 13th | |
| 1992–93 | 7 | 2ª Reg. | 4th | |
| 1993–94 | 7 | 2ª Reg. | 3rd | |
| 1994–95 | 7 | 2ª Reg. | 3rd | |
| 1995–96 | 7 | 2ª Reg. | 2nd | |
| 1996–97 | 6 | 1ª Reg. | 11th | |
| 1997–98 | 6 | 1ª Reg. | 2nd | |
| 1998–99 | 5 | Reg. Pref. | 18th | |
| 1999–2000 | 6 | 1ª Reg. | 9th | |
| 2000–01 | 6 | 1ª Reg. | 6th | |
| 2001–02 | 6 | 1ª Reg. | 8th | |
| 2002–03 | 6 | 1ª Reg. | 2nd | |
| 2003–04 | 5 | Reg. Pref. | 20th | |
| 2004–05 | 6 | 1ª Reg. | 14th | |
| 2005–06 | 6 | 1ª Reg. | 9th | |
| 2006–07 | 6 | 1ª Aut. | 11th | |
| 2007–08 | 6 | 1ª Aut. | 12th | |
| 2008–09 | 6 | 1ª Aut. | 8th | |
| 2009–10 | 6 | 1ª Aut. | 9th | |
| 2010–11 | 6 | 1ª Aut. | 17th | |

| Season | Tier | Division | Place | Copa del Rey |
|---|---|---|---|---|
| 2011–12 | 7 | 2ª Aut. | 4th | |
| 2012–13 | 7 | 2ª Aut. | 5th | |
| 2013–14 | 7 | 2ª Aut. | 3rd | |
| 2014–15 | 7 | 2ª Aut. | 6th | |
| 2015–16 | 7 | 2ª Aut. | 4th | |
| 2016–17 | 7 | 2ª Gal. | 4th | |
| 2017–18 | 7 | 2ª Gal. | 10th | |
| 2018–19 | 7 | 2ª Gal. | 9th | |
| 2019–20 | 7 | 2ª Gal. | 10th | |
| 2020–21 | DNP | | | |
| 2021–22 | 8 | 2ª Gal. | 6th | |
| 2022–23 | 8 | 2ª Gal. | 9th | |
| 2023–24 | 8 | 2ª Gal. | 2nd | |
| 2024–25 | 8 | 2ª Futgal | 1st | |
| 2025–26 | 7 | 1ª Futgal | | |
