= 1992–93 Tercera División =

Tercera División
- Season: 1992–93

The 1992–93 Tercera División season is the 16th season since the establishment of the tier four.

== League table ==
=== Group 1 ===
Pos	Team	Pld	W	D	L	GF	GA	GD	Pts	Qualification or relegation
1	Arosa SC	38	21	13	4	51	16	+35	55	Promotion play-offs
2	Viveiro CF	38	20	12	6	65	29	+36	52	Promotion play-offs
3	CD Arenteiro	38	21	10	7	70	38	+32	52	Promotion play-offs
4	Villalonga FC	38	14	16	8	44	25	+19	44	Promotion play-offs
5	Deportivo de La Coruña B	38	17	9	12	63	41	+22	43	
6	Juventud Cambados	38	15	12	11	48	41	+7	42	
7	SD Órdenes	38	14	14	10	44	33	+11	42	
8	UD Xove Lago	38	15	10	13	46	36	+10	40	
9	RC Villalbés	38	11	18	9	43	46	−3	40	
10	CD Estradense	38	11	15	12	34	45	−11	37	
11	CD Lalín	38	11	14	13	42	43	−1	36	
12	Portonovo SD	38	13	10	15	40	42	−2	36	
13	Bergantiños FC	38	13	10	15	38	36	+2	36	
14	Caselas FC	38	14	8	16	45	59	−14	36	
15	CD Barco	38	10	14	14	32	44	−12	34	
16	SDC Mindoniense	38	10	13	15	44	56	−12	33	
17	SD Burela	38	11	11	16	40	59	−19	33	
18	Gondomar CF	38	8	15	15	44	60	−16	31	Relegation
19	Gran Peña FC	38	5	12	21	27	64	−37	22	Relegation
20	Meirás CF	38	4	8	26	26	73	−47	16	Relegation

Source: Fútbol Regional

=== Group 2 ===
Pos	Team	Pld	W	D	L	GF	GA	GD	Pts	Qualification or relegation
1	Caudal Deportivo	38	28	5	5	85	30	+55	61	Promotion play-offs
2	CD Lealtad	38	24	10	4	75	29	+46	58	Promotion play-offs
3	UP Langreo	38	23	9	6	81	32	+49	55	Promotion play-offs
4	Club Siero	38	20	11	7	56	32	+24	51	Promotion play-offs
5	Club Hispano	38	21	8	9	62	27	+35	50	
6	Santiago de Aller CF	38	17	9	12	44	32	+12	43	
7	Deportiva Piloñesa	38	16	9	13	47	51	−4	41	
8	Candás CF	38	13	13	12	37	40	−3	39	
9	CD Turón	38	12	13	13	39	49	−10	37	
10	Club Marino	38	12	13	13	47	51	−4	37	
11	Real Titánico	38	14	9	15	41	44	−3	37	
12	Navia CF	38	11	11	16	43	47	−4	33	
13	UD Gijón Industrial	38	9	14	15	48	45	+3	32	
14	SD Lenense	38	8	14	16	34	58	−24	30	
15	Astur CF	38	8	13	17	35	50	−15	29	
16	Ribadesella CF	38	11	7	20	34	51	−17	29	
17	Pumarín CF	38	9	10	19	33	53	−20	28	
18	CD Mosconia	38	12	4	22	39	68	−29	28	Relegation
19	AD Universidad de Oviedo	38	9	8	21	39	72	−33	26	Relegation
20	Europa de Nava	38	5	6	27	24	82	−58	16	Relegation

Source: Fútbol Regional

=== Group 3 ===
Pos	Team	Pld	W	D	L	GF	GA	GD	Pts	Qualification or relegation
1	UM Escobedo	38	24	12	2	68	19	+49	60	Promotion play-offs
2	SD Rayo Cantabria	38	22	11	5	68	28	+40	55	Promotion play-offs
3	CD Laredo	38	20	7	11	59	27	+32	47	Promotion play-offs
4	SD Noja	38	17	13	8	52	31	+21	47	Promotion play-offs
5	Marina de Cudeyo CF	38	15	16	7	34	19	+15	46	
6	CD Comillas	38	17	11	10	56	36	+20	45	
7	CD Tropezón	38	16	12	10	39	38	+1	44	
8	CD Cayón	38	14	14	10	44	30	+14	42	
9	CD Colindres	38	15	11	12	41	35	+6	41	
10	Castro FC	38	12	15	11	32	28	+4	39	
11	CD Pontejos	38	14	10	14	41	46	−5	38	
12	Unión Club Astillero	38	13	10	15	28	28	0	36	
13	SD Torina Puertas Nueva Castilla	38	12	11	15	45	47	−2	35	
14	Ribamontán al Mar CF	38	12	6	20	35	55	−20	30	
15	CD Ramales	38	10	9	19	32	53	−21	29	
16	CD Naval	38	8	12	18	31	52	−21	28	
17	SD Barreda Balompié	38	8	11	19	31	57	−26	27	
18	Santoña CF	38	8	11	19	24	47	−23	27	Relegation
19	SD Textil Escudo	38	10	6	22	27	65	−38	26	Relegation
20	Selaya CF	38	6	6	26	20	66	−46	18	Relegation

Source: Fútbol Regional

=== Group 4 ===
Pos	Team	Pld	W	D	L	GF	GA	GD	Pts	Qualification or relegation
1	Real Unión	38	21	12	5	58	27	+31	54	Promotion play-offs
2	Club Bermeo	38	18	14	6	50	35	+15	50	Promotion play-offs
3	Mondragón CF	38	16	15	7	59	34	+25	47	Promotion play-offs
4	CD Touring	38	21	5	12	60	44	+16	47	Promotion play-offs
5	CD Aurrerá Ondarroa	38	17	10	11	51	37	+14	44	
6	Amurrio Club	38	19	6	13	60	48	+12	44	
7	CD Munguía	38	16	10	12	49	40	+9	42	
8	Arenas Club de Getxo	38	14	12	12	46	41	+5	40	
9	CD Getxo	38	15	9	14	52	49	+3	39	
10	SD Gernika Club	38	17	5	16	38	42	−4	39	
11	Sodupe UC	38	15	9	14	59	55	+4	39	
12	SD Urola KE	38	14	10	14	53	47	+6	38	
13	SCD Durango	38	16	6	16	48	43	+5	38	
14	SD Amorebieta	38	15	8	15	50	46	+4	38	
15	SD Erandio Club	38	13	7	18	56	64	−8	33	
16	Tolosa CF	38	12	8	18	33	50	−17	32	
17	Zalla UC	38	10	11	17	31	48	−17	31	
18	CD Lagún Onak	38	11	4	23	42	58	−16	26	Relegation
19	CD Galdakao	38	6	9	23	24	68	−44	21	Relegation
20	Santutxu FC	38	7	4	27	42	85	−43	18	Relegation

Source: Fútbol Regional

=== Group 5 ===
Pos	Team	Pld	W	D	L	GF	GA	GD	Pts	Qualification or relegation
1	CD Premiá	38	17	13	8	73	45	+28	47	Promotion play-offs
2	UDA Gramenet	38	18	10	10	64	37	+27	46	Promotion play-offs
3	UE Rubí	38	18	10	10	49	37	+12	46	Promotion play-offs
4	CD Júpiter	38	17	12	9	57	46	+11	46	Promotion play-offs
5	FC Martinenc	38	16	14	8	56	45	+11	46	
6	CRE Cristinenc Espanyol	38	18	8	12	57	42	+15	44	
7	Terrassa FC	38	17	10	11	53	45	+8	44	
8	CF Balaguer	38	17	9	12	57	43	+14	43	
9	CF Reus Deportiu	38	13	13	12	44	45	−1	39	
10	EC Granollers	38	13	11	14	49	51	−2	37	
11	FC Barcelona C	38	14	9	15	75	49	+26	37	
12	Atlètic Roda de Barà	38	11	14	13	40	48	−8	36	
13	CF Igualada	38	11	12	15	50	58	−8	34	
14	CE Europa	38	10	13	15	44	59	−15	33	
15	Vilobí CF	38	14	5	19	53	64	−11	33	
16	FC Palafrugell	38	8	17	13	47	63	−16	33	
17	CD Tortosa	38	11	9	18	43	53	−10	31	
18	CD Blanes	38	11	7	20	38	63	−25	29	
19	CE Manresa	38	13	3	22	52	70	−18	29	Relegation
20	CFJ Mollerussa	38	8	11	19	38	76	−38	27	Relegation

Source: Fútbol Regional

=== Group 6 ===
Pos	Team	Pld	W	D	L	GF	GA	GD	Pts	Qualification or relegation
1	Pinoso CF	38	18	13	7	49	29	+20	49	Promotion play-offs
2	Crevillente Deportivo	38	19	11	8	51	39	+12	49	Promotion play-offs
3	CD Villena	38	20	9	9	57	38	+19	49	Promotion play-offs
4	UD Oliva	38	20	8	10	58	29	+29	48	Promotion play-offs
5	Calpe CF	38	20	8	10	54	43	+11	48	
6	Ontinyent CF	38	16	13	9	45	23	+22	45	
7	CF Gandía	38	18	8	12	61	39	+22	44	
8	CD Alaquás	38	17	8	13	45	41	+4	42	
9	SD Sueca	38	13	15	10	43	39	+4	41	
10	CD Jávea	38	14	12	12	43	28	+15	40	
11	CD Eldense	38	13	14	11	53	41	+12	40	
12	CD Alberique	38	12	12	14	45	48	−3	36	
13	Muchamiel CF	38	12	12	14	48	52	−4	36	
14	UD Alzira	38	12	11	15	31	51	−20	35	
15	UD Carcaixent	38	13	8	17	57	63	−6	34	Relegation
16	CD Benicarló	38	12	8	18	47	47	0	32	Relegation
17	Foyos CD	38	9	9	20	39	62	−23	27	Relegation
18	Torrent CF	38	6	15	17	22	42	−20	27	Relegation
19	Picasent CF	38	8	8	22	39	73	−34	24	Relegation
20	Atlético Saguntino	38	3	8	27	31	91	−60	14	Relegation

Source: Fútbol Regional

=== Group 7 ===
Pos	Team	Pld	W	D	L	GF	GA	GD	Pts	Qualification or relegation
1	CF Fuenlabrada	38	25	9	4	76	28	+48	59	Promotion play-offs
2	Real Madrid C	38	25	8	5	86	27	+59	58	Promotion play-offs
3	CDC Moscardó	38	18	13	7	54	35	+19	49	Promotion play-offs
4	UD San Sebastián de los Reyes	38	15	15	8	53	35	+18	45	Promotion play-offs
5	AD Torrejón	38	18	9	11	57	55	+2	45	
6	CD Móstoles	38	14	15	9	54	35	+19	43	
7	CD San Fernando de Henares	38	15	11	12	47	35	+12	41	
8	Rayo Majadahonda	38	15	10	13	53	41	+12	40	
9	Rayo Vallecano B	38	12	14	12	40	37	+3	38	
10	CD Las Rozas	38	13	12	13	48	46	+2	38	
11	SR Villaverde Boetticher CF	38	15	7	16	48	61	−13	37	
12	CD Carabanchel	38	14	9	15	62	65	−3	37	
13	AD Parla	38	12	12	14	43	51	−8	36	
14	CD Vicálvaro	38	13	9	16	57	60	−3	35	
15	DAV Santa Ana	38	13	9	16	51	55	−4	35	
16	CD El Álamo	38	12	11	15	46	53	−7	35	
17	CD Pegaso	38	11	9	18	49	61	−12	31	
18	CD Puerta Bonita	38	12	5	21	39	62	−23	29	Relegation
19	AD Colmenar Viejo	38	5	5	28	37	86	−49	15	Relegation
20	CDA Navalcarnero	38	2	10	26	24	96	−72	14	Relegation

Source: Fútbol Regional

=== Group 8 ===
Pos	Team	Pld	W	D	L	GF	GA	GD	Pts	Qualification or relegation
1	Zamora CF	38	26	8	4	93	33	+60	60	Promotion play-offs
2	CD Laguna	38	22	7	9	59	42	+17	51	Promotion play-offs
3	CA Bembibre	38	20	9	9	62	42	+20	49	Promotion play-offs
4	RCD Ribert	38	19	11	8	64	38	+26	49	Promotion play-offs
5	Atlético Burgalés	38	18	9	11	56	34	+22	45	
6	SD Hullera Vasco-Leonesa	38	18	8	12	55	45	+10	44	
7	SD Gimnástica Segoviana	38	12	18	8	56	38	+18	42	
8	CD Salmantino	38	14	13	11	61	42	+19	41	
9	Racing Lermeño	38	15	11	12	47	38	+9	41	
10	La Bañeza FC	38	14	12	12	47	45	+2	40	
11	Arandina CF	38	11	17	10	55	45	+10	39	
12	SD Almazán	38	15	7	16	54	61	−7	37	
13	Cultural de León	38	13	10	15	50	48	+2	36	
14	CD Venta de Baños	38	12	11	15	32	43	−11	35	
15	CD Béjar Industrial	38	10	11	17	40	62	−22	31	
16	SD Gimnástica Medinense	38	10	9	19	50	64	−14	29	
17	SC Uxama	38	10	8	20	39	57	−18	28	
18	SD Covaleda	38	6	14	18	33	72	−39	26	Relegation
19	Atlético Astorga FC	38	7	11	20	36	72	−36	25	Relegation
20	CP Monteresma	38	4	4	30	23	91	−68	12	Relegation

Source: Fútbol Regional

=== Group 9 ===
Pos	Team	Pld	W	D	L	GF	GA	GD	Pts	Qualification or relegation
1	Atlético Malagueño	38	28	8	2	93	22	+71	64	Promotion play-offs
2	Almería CF	38	28	7	3	88	26	+62	63	Promotion play-offs
3	CP Almería	38	24	7	7	84	30	+54	55	Promotion play-offs
4	CD Mármol Macael	38	22	10	6	74	24	+50	54	Promotion play-offs
5	Guadix CF	38	19	8	11	42	33	+9	46	
6	CD Roquetas	38	17	11	10	50	39	+11	45	
7	Atarfe Industrial CF	38	17	8	13	70	53	+17	42	
8	Iliturgi CF	38	12	15	11	45	38	+7	39	
9	Martos CF	38	15	8	15	38	36	+2	38	
10	UD Maracena	38	15	8	15	46	53	−7	38	
11	AD Adra	38	15	7	16	44	39	+5	37	
12	Baeza CF	38	13	10	15	36	50	−14	36	
13	Vélez CF	38	15	5	18	38	43	−5	35	
14	Úbeda CF	38	12	8	18	39	62	−23	32	
15	CD Los Boliches	38	10	10	18	36	50	−14	30	
16	Juventud de Torremolinos CF	38	13	3	22	35	78	−43	29	
17	UD San Pedro	38	7	14	17	28	50	−22	28	
18	Recreativo de Granada	38	6	12	20	24	52	−28	24	
19	Motril CF	38	2	9	27	18	67	−49	13	Relegation
20	CD Real de Melilla	38	3	6	29	23	106	−83	12	Relegation

Source: Fútbol Regional

=== Group 10 ===
Pos	Team	Pld	W	D	L	GF	GA	GD	Pts	Qualification or relegation
1	Atlético Cortegana	38	19	14	5	56	24	+32	52	Promotion play-offs
2	CD Mairena	38	20	11	7	50	29	+21	51	Promotion play-offs
3	CD San Fernando	38	18	13	7	57	30	+27	49	Promotion play-offs
4	CMD San Juan	38	16	13	9	42	34	+8	45	Promotion play-offs
5	Atlético Sanluqueño CF	38	14	16	8	43	29	+14	44	
6	UD Los Palacios	38	15	13	10	46	31	+15	43	
7	Coria CF	38	16	10	12	61	50	+11	42	
8	Cádiz CF B	38	16	8	14	54	45	+9	40	
9	Atlético Lucentino Industrial	38	11	16	11	45	42	+3	38	
10	CD Pozoblanco	38	14	9	15	49	39	+10	37	
11	Puente Genil CF	38	12	13	13	30	34	−4	37	
12	UD Roteña	38	12	12	14	35	39	−4	36	
13	Jerez Industrial CF	38	12	12	14	41	43	−2	36	
14	Montilla CF	38	14	7	17	40	49	−9	35	
15	CD Lebrija	38	12	11	15	50	48	+2	35	
16	La Palma CF	38	10	12	16	35	50	−15	32	Relegation
17	Algeciras CF	38	10	12	16	53	65	−12	32	Relegation
18	Arcos CF	38	8	14	16	33	58	−25	30	Relegation
19	CD Rota	38	9	10	19	28	60	−32	28	Relegation
20	Chiclana CF	38	5	8	25	27	76	−49	18	Relegation

Source: Fútbol Regional

=== Group 11 ===
Pos	Team	Pld	W	D	L	GF	GA	GD	Pts	Qualification or relegation
1	CD Manacor	38	25	7	6	91	38	+53	57	Promotion play-offs
2	SCR Peña Deportiva	38	22	9	7	59	32	+27	53	Promotion play-offs
3	RCD Mallorca Atlético	38	23	6	9	97	39	+58	52	Promotion play-offs
4	CD Playas de Calvià	38	24	4	10	73	39	+34	52	Promotion play-offs
5	UD Poblense	38	19	6	13	51	39	+12	44	
6	CD Ferriolense	38	16	11	11	39	38	+1	43	
7	CD Alayor	38	16	11	11	63	50	+13	43	
8	CD Atlético Baleares	38	15	12	11	58	47	+11	42	
9	CD Ferrerías	38	15	10	13	46	45	+1	40	
10	CF Sóller	38	15	8	15	56	48	+8	38	
11	CD Cala Millor	38	14	9	15	51	64	−13	37	
12	UD Arenal	38	13	7	18	44	51	−7	33	
13	CD Cardassar	38	9	15	14	42	47	−5	33	
14	Atlético de Ciudadela CF	38	11	10	17	46	61	−15	32	
15	CD Constancia	38	12	8	18	49	59	−10	32	
16	CD Esporlas	38	11	9	18	44	62	−18	31	
17	SD Portmany	38	8	12	18	37	68	−31	28	Relegation
18	Porto Cristo CF	38	11	4	23	38	66	−28	26	Relegation
19	CD Llosetense	38	7	10	21	45	71	−26	24	Relegation
20	CD Son Roca	38	6	8	24	32	97	−65	20	Relegation

Source: Fútbol Regional

=== Group 12 ===
Pos	Team	Pld	W	D	L	GF	GA	GD	Pts	Qualification or relegation
1	UD Realejos	38	23	7	8	94	47	+47	53	Promotion play-offs
2	AD Laguna	38	20	10	8	60	36	+24	50	Promotion play-offs
3	UD Telde	38	18	13	7	61	37	+24	49	Promotion play-offs
4	UD Orotava	38	18	9	11	62	46	+16	45	Promotion play-offs
5	UD Las Palmas B	38	18	7	13	90	42	+48	43	
6	Estrella CF	38	16	10	12	48	44	+4	42	
7	CD Corralejo	38	14	11	13	49	40	+9	39	
8	SD Tenisca	38	15	9	14	63	49	+14	39	
9	CD Arguineguín	38	13	13	12	42	46	−4	39	
10	UD Salud Tenerife	38	14	9	15	53	57	−4	37	
11	UD Ibarra	38	12	12	14	33	38	−5	36	
12	UD Vecindario	38	13	8	17	35	47	−12	34	
13	Atlético Arona	38	12	10	16	52	64	−12	34	
14	UD Güímar	38	10	13	15	39	51	−12	33	
15	UD Gáldar	38	11	10	17	44	69	−25	32	
16	UD Lanzarote	38	12	8	18	53	79	−26	32	
17	Real Artesano FC	38	11	10	17	31	47	−16	32	
18	UD Aridane	38	11	9	18	43	60	−17	31	Relegation
19	CD Unión Tejina	38	12	6	20	26	60	−34	30	Relegation
20	CD San Andrés	38	9	12	17	30	49	−19	30	Relegation

Source: Fútbol Regional

=== Group 13 ===
Pos	Team	Pld	W	D	L	GF	GA	GD	Pts	Qualification or relegation
1	CD Cieza	38	23	10	5	62	24	+38	56	Promotion play-offs
2	Caravaca CF	38	22	9	7	60	30	+30	53	Promotion play-offs
3	CD Roldán	38	23	6	9	75	39	+36	52	Promotion play-offs
4	AD Mar Menor	38	19	10	9	62	41	+21	48	Promotion play-offs
5	CD Beniel	38	17	13	8	53	30	+23	47	
6	Lorca Promesas CF	38	18	9	11	62	37	+25	45	
7	CD Torre Pacheco	38	17	10	11	60	39	+21	44	
8	Cartagena FC B	38	15	11	12	46	40	+6	41	
9	Pinatar CF	38	16	8	14	49	43	+6	40	
10	Águilas CF	38	13	11	14	47	44	+3	37	
11	Abarán CF	38	13	11	14	48	39	+9	37	
12	CF Lorca Deportiva	38	11	10	17	42	59	−17	32	
13	Cehegín CF	38	11	10	17	31	53	−22	32	
14	Muleño CF	38	11	10	17	29	54	−25	32	
15	Imperial CF	38	10	12	16	38	49	−11	32	
16	CF Santomera	38	11	7	20	48	69	−21	29	
17	Jumilla CF	38	9	10	19	38	57	−19	28	
18	AD Cotillas CF	38	6	14	18	31	55	−24	26	Relegation
19	CD Cieza Promesas	38	8	9	21	28	76	−48	25	Relegation
20	AD San Miguel	38	9	6	23	32	63	−31	24	Relegation

Source: Fútbol Regional

=== Group 14 ===
Pos	Team	Pld	W	D	L	GF	GA	GD	Pts	Qualification or relegation
1	Moralo CP	38	31	2	5	112	24	+88	64	Promotion play-offs
2	CD Don Benito	38	27	9	2	100	19	+81	63	Promotion play-offs
3	Club Cristian Lay Jerez	38	28	6	4	94	24	+70	62	Promotion play-offs
4	UP Plasencia	38	24	10	4	81	39	+42	58	Promotion play-offs
5	CD San Serván	38	21	12	5	59	25	+34	54	
6	CD Badajoz Promesas	38	18	11	9	53	33	+20	47	
7	CD Castuera	38	12	14	12	38	38	0	38	
8	UD Fornacense	38	13	10	15	56	58	−2	36	
9	CD Burguillos	38	11	13	14	48	51	−3	35	
10	UD Mérida Promesas	38	11	12	15	40	47	−7	34	
11	CD Montijo	38	12	10	16	54	58	−4	34	
12	AD Llerenense	38	12	9	17	50	68	−18	33	
13	CD Miajadas	38	12	9	17	43	59	−16	33	
14	UC La Estrella	38	8	12	18	42	57	−15	28	
15	CD Azuaga	38	9	10	19	34	58	−24	28	
16	SP Villafranca	38	9	10	19	41	75	−34	28	
17	CP Malpartida Cacereño	38	7	12	19	51	76	−25	26	
18	CD Díter Zafra	38	9	5	24	44	83	−39	23	Relegation
19	CP Medellín	38	6	9	23	25	72	−47	21	Relegation
20	CP Cetarsa Talayuela	38	6	3	29	31	132	−101	15	Relegation

Source: Fútbol Regional

=== Group 15 ===
Pos	Team	Pld	W	D	L	GF	GA	GD	Pts	Qualification or relegation
1	Peña Sport FC	38	23	13	2	76	37	+39	59	Promotion play-offs
2	CD Calahorra	38	22	10	6	68	27	+41	54	Promotion play-offs
3	CD Mirandés	38	21	10	7	62	32	+30	52	Promotion play-offs
4	CD Egüés	38	17	17	4	52	29	+23	51	Promotion play-offs
5	CD Beti Onak	38	20	8	10	59	41	+18	48	
6	UDC Chantrea	38	18	8	12	61	47	+14	44	
7	CD Oberena	38	14	9	15	53	50	+3	37	
8	Atlético Artajonés	38	11	15	12	47	49	−2	37	
9	CD Ribaforada	38	15	7	16	43	59	−16	37	
10	CD Alfaro	38	13	11	14	50	44	+6	37	
11	UCD Burladés	38	11	13	14	37	42	−5	35	
12	AD Noáin	38	14	7	17	39	36	+3	35	
13	CA River Ebro	38	12	10	16	58	62	−4	34	
14	CD Arnedo	38	12	10	16	49	54	−5	34	
15	AD San Juan	38	14	5	19	43	46	−3	33	
16	Haro Deportivo	38	13	7	18	47	72	−25	33	
17	CD Varea	38	9	12	17	41	63	−22	30	
18	CD San Adrián	38	10	10	18	31	56	−25	30	Relegation
19	CD Azkoyen	38	7	8	23	42	72	−30	22	Relegation
20	SD Loyola	38	5	8	25	36	76	−40	18	Relegation

Source: Fútbol Regional

=== Group 16 ===
Pos	Team	Pld	W	D	L	GF	GA	GD	Pts	Qualification or relegation
1	SD Huesca	38	27	7	4	89	32	+57	61	Promotion play-offs
2	Utebo FC	38	21	12	5	62	15	+47	54	Promotion play-offs
3	UD Barbastro	38	22	10	6	74	34	+40	54	Promotion play-offs
4	UD Casetas	38	20	12	6	59	35	+24	52	Promotion play-offs
5	CF Hernán Cortés	38	19	10	9	63	41	+22	48	
6	CD Teruel	38	19	9	10	50	29	+21	47	
7	CD Binéfar	38	17	13	8	48	32	+16	47	
8	UD Fraga	38	14	12	12	53	42	+11	40	
9	CD Ebro	38	14	9	15	48	53	−5	37	
10	AD Sabiñánigo	38	13	10	15	50	57	−7	36	
11	CDJ Tamarite	38	13	9	16	49	55	−6	35	
12	CD La Almunia	38	13	8	17	43	61	−18	34	
13	CD Caspe	38	8	16	14	35	47	−12	32	
14	CD Sariñena	38	8	16	14	41	59	−18	32	
15	Atlético de Monzón	38	9	12	17	35	49	−14	30	
16	Atlético Monzalbarba	38	10	10	18	42	71	−29	30	
17	Alcañiz CF	38	9	12	17	34	47	−13	30	
18	Alcolea CF	38	6	15	17	38	51	−13	27	Relegation
19	SD Ejea	38	6	8	24	28	72	−44	20	Relegation
20	CD Mallén	38	4	6	28	31	90	−59	14	Relegation

Source: Fútbol Regional

=== Group 17 ===
Pos	Team	Pld	W	D	L	GF	GA	GD	Pts	Qualification or relegation
1	Talavera CF	38	25	10	3	82	26	+56	60	Promotion play-offs
2	UB Conquense	38	27	6	5	75	17	+58	60	Promotion play-offs
3	CD Manchego	38	25	6	7	62	24	+38	56	Promotion play-offs
4	Manzanares CF	38	21	8	9	70	41	+29	50	Promotion play-offs
5	CF Gimnástico Alcázar	38	18	10	10	55	29	+26	46	
6	Puertollano Industrial CF	38	18	8	12	54	34	+20	44	
7	CD Torrijos	38	11	17	10	44	37	+7	39	
8	UD Socuéllamos CF	38	15	8	15	52	49	+3	38	
9	Albacete Balompié B	38	13	12	13	44	34	+10	38	
10	CD La Roda	38	12	11	15	37	54	−17	35	
11	CD Azuqueca	38	13	9	16	44	57	−13	35	
12	AD Campillo	38	13	8	17	47	56	−9	34	
13	CD Los Yébenes	38	15	4	19	51	61	−10	34	
14	CD Guadalajara	38	13	7	18	43	52	−9	33	
15	Atlético Pedro Muñoz CF	38	10	12	16	44	66	−22	32	
16	CP Villarrobledo	38	10	10	18	36	53	−17	30	
17	CD Mavisa Villacañas	38	10	10	18	48	72	−24	30	
18	CF La Solana	38	11	7	20	51	71	−20	29	Relegation
19	Motilla CF	38	9	4	25	41	94	−53	22	Relegation
20	AD Tarancón	38	5	5	28	32	85	−53	15	Relegation

Source: Fútbol Regional

== Playoffs ==
- 1992–93 Segunda División B Play-Off
