= Villalonga FC =

Spanish football club

Villalonga
- Full name: Villalonga Fútbol Club
- Nickname: Los Celestes
- Founded: 1947; 79 years ago
- Stadium: San Pedro
- Capacity: 2,000
- President: Pablo Estévez
- Head coach: Roberto Lázaro
- League: Preferente Futgal – Group 2
- 2025–26: Preferente Futgal – Group 2, 9th of 18
Home colours	Away colours

Villalonga Fútbol Club is a football team based in Vilalonga in the autonomous community of Galicia. Founded in 1947, the team plays in the Preferente Futgal – Group 2, holding home matches at the San Pedro, which has a capacity of 2,000 spectators.

== Season to season ==
Season	Tier	Division	Place	Copa del Rey
1950–51	5	1ª Reg.	3rd	
1951–52	5	1ª Reg.	5th	
1952–53	5	1ª Reg.	5th	
1953–54	5	1ª Reg.	5th	
1954–55	5	1ª Reg.	1st	
1955–56	5	1ª Reg.	4th	
1956–57	5	1ª Reg.	4th	
1957–58	5	1ª Reg.	7th	
1958–59	5	1ª Reg.	8th	
1959–60	5	1ª Reg.	6th	
1960–61	5	1ª Reg.	8th	
1961–62	5	1ª Reg.	11th	
1962–63	5	1ª Reg.	7th	
1963–64	6	2ª Reg.	1st	
1964–65	5	1ª Reg.	6th	
1965–66	5	1ª Reg.	12th	
1966–67	5	1ª Reg.	11th	
1967–68	5	1ª Reg.	6th	
1968–69	5	1ª Reg.		
1969–70	5	1ª Reg.	11th	

Season	Tier	Division	Place	Copa del Rey
1970–71	5	1ª Reg.	1st	
1971–72	5	1ª Reg.	8th	
1972–73	5	1ª Reg.	4th	
1973–74	5	1ª Reg.	4th	
1974–75	5	1ª Reg.	2nd	
1975–76	5	1ª Reg.	2nd	
1976–77	5	1ª Reg.	8th	
1977–78	6	1ª Reg.	8th	
1978–79	7	2ª Reg.	4th	
1979–80	7	2ª Reg.	4th	
1980–81	6	1ª Reg.	10th	
1981–82	6	1ª Reg.	7th	
1982–83	6	1ª Reg.	14th	
1983–84	6	1ª Reg.	11th	
1984–85	6	1ª Reg.	15th	
1985–86	5	Reg. Pref.	17th	
1986–87	6	1ª Reg.	1st	
1987–88	5	Reg. Pref.	1st	
1988–89	4	3ª	7th	
1989–90	4	3ª	3rd	

Season	Tier	Division	Place	Copa del Rey
1990–91	4	3ª	7th	First round
1991–92	4	3ª	14th	First round
1992–93	4	3ª	4th	
1993–94	4	3ª	9th	First round
1994–95	4	3ª	16th	
1995–96	4	3ª	10th	
1996–97	4	3ª	8th	
1997–98	4	3ª	13th	
1998–99	4	3ª	15th	
1999–2000	4	3ª	19th	
2000–01	5	Reg. Pref.	11th	
2001–02	5	Reg. Pref.	7th	
2002–03	5	Reg. Pref.	4th	
2003–04	5	Reg. Pref.	1st	
2004–05	4	3ª	16th	
2005–06	4	3ª	13th	
2006–07	4	3ª	4th	
2007–08	4	3ª	6th	
2008–09	4	3ª	16th	
2009–10	4	3ª	12th	
2010–11	4	3ª	9th	

Season	Tier	Division	Place	Copa del Rey
2011–12	4	3ª	9th	
2012–13	4	3ª	17th	
2013–14	5	Pref. Aut.	3rd	
2014–15	5	Pref. Aut.	6th	
2015–16	5	Pref.	1st	
2016–17	4	3ª	10th	
2017–18	4	3ª	20th	
2018–19	5	Pref.	9th	
2019–20	5	Pref.	4th	
2020–21	5	Pref.	2nd / 3rd	
2021–22	6	Pref.	2nd	
2022–23	6	Pref.	10th	
2023–24	6	Pref.	1st	
2024–25	5	3ª Fed.	17th	
2025–26	6	Pref. Futgal		

- 21 seasons in Tercera División
- 1 season in Tercera Federación

== Notable players ==
- (Spain) Ruben Cerqueiras
- (Spain) David Bistilleiro
- (Spain) Ivan Parada
- (Spain) José Núñez
- (Spain) Adrián Santos
- (Spain) Ivan Renda
- (Spain) Santi Padin
- (Spain) Javier Pazos
- (Spain) Adrián Padin
- (Spain) Jose Filgueira
- (Spain) Manuel Ramilo
- (Spain) Manu
- (Spain) Aarón Paredes
- (Spain) Aarón Trelles
