= SD Chantada =

Spanish football club

Chantada
- Full name: Sociedad Deportiva Chantada
- Founded: 1970
- Ground: Campo Municipal Sangoñedo, Chantada, Galicia, Spain
- Capacity: 500
- Chairman: Jorge Nodar
- Manager: Traste
- League: Primera Futgal – Group 3
- 2024–25: Primera Futgal – Group 3, 4th of 18
Home colours	Away colours

Sociedad Deportiva Chantada is a football team based in Chantada in the autonomous community of Galicia. Founded in 1970, it plays in the Primera Futgal – Group 3. Its stadium is Campo Municipal Sangoñedo.

== Season to season ==
Season	Tier	Division	Place	Copa del Rey
1970–71	5	1ª Reg.	4th	
1971–72	5	1ª Reg.	3rd	
1972–73	5	1ª Reg.	7th	
1973–74	5	1ª Reg.	6th	
1974–75	5	1ª Reg.	3rd	
1975–76	5	1ª Reg.	10th	
1976–77	5	1ª Reg.	2nd	
1977–78	6	1ª Reg.	1st	
1978–79	5	Reg. Pref.	17th	
1979–80	5	Reg. Pref.	17th	
1980–81	5	Reg. Pref.	15th	
1981–82	5	Reg. Pref.	8th	
1982–83	5	Reg. Pref.	15th	
1983–84	5	Reg. Pref.	13th	
1984–85	5	Reg. Pref.	4th	
1985–86	5	Reg. Pref.	19th	
1986–87	5	Reg. Pref.	19th	
1987–88	5	Reg. Pref.	15th	
1988–89	6	1ª Reg.	19th	
1989–90	7	2ª Reg.	7th	

Season	Tier	Division	Place	Copa del Rey
1990–91	7	2ª Reg.	4th	
1991–92	7	2ª Reg.	1st	
1992–93	6	1ª Reg.	10th	
1993–94	6	1ª Reg.	7th	
1994–95	6	1ª Reg.	5th	
1995–96	6	1ª Reg.	11th	
1996–97	6	1ª Reg.	12th	
1997–98	6	1ª Reg.	3rd	
1998–99	6	1ª Reg.	10th	
1999–2000	6	1ª Reg.	10th	
2000–01	6	1ª Reg.	3rd	
2001–02	6	1ª Reg.	13th	
2002–03	6	1ª Reg.	4th	
2003–04	6	1ª Reg.	2nd	
2004–05	5	Reg. Pref.	15th	
2005–06	5	Reg. Pref.	15th	
2006–07	5	Pref. Aut.	15th	
2007–08	5	Pref. Aut.	10th	
2008–09	5	Pref. Aut.	17th	
2009–10	5	Pref. Aut.	19th	

Season	Tier	Division	Place	Copa del Rey
2010–11	6	1ª Aut.	1st	
2011–12	5	Pref. Aut.	9th	
2012–13	5	Pref. Aut.	16th	
2013–14	5	Pref. Aut.	12th	
2014–15	5	Pref. Aut.	12th	
2015–16	5	Pref.	11th	
2016–17	5	Pref.	17th	
2017–18	6	1ª Gal.	4th	
2018–19	6	1ª Gal.	3rd	
2019–20	6	1ª Gal.	4th	
2020–21	DNP			
2021–22	6	1ª Gal.	3rd	
2022–23	6	1ª Gal.	2nd	
2023–24	6	1ª Gal.	3rd	
2024–25	6	1ª Futgal	4th	
2025–26	6	1ª Futgal		
