= CD Barco =

Association football club in Spain

Coordinates: 42.415884°N 6.996318°W

Barco
- Full name: Centro de Deportes Barco
- Founded: 29 April 1973; 53 years ago
- Stadium: Estadio Municipal de Calabagueiros
- Capacity: 2,000
- President: Nilo Ramos
- Head coach: Brais Prados
- League: Tercera Federación – Group 1
- 2025–26: Tercera Federación – Group 1, 11th of 18
Home colours	Away colours

Centro de Deportes Barco is a football team based in O Barco de Valdeorras in the autonomous community of Galicia. Founded in 1973, it plays in Tercera Federación – Group 1. Its stadium is Estadio Municipal de Calabagueiros.

== Season to season ==
Season	Tier	Division	Place	Copa del Rey
1973–74	6	2ª Reg.	8th	
1974–75	6	2ª Reg.	13th	
1975–76	6	2ª Reg.	7th	
1976–77	6	2ª Reg.		
1977–78	7	2ª Reg.	1st	
1978–79	6	1ª Reg.		
1979–80	6	1ª Reg.	8th	
1980–81	6	1ª Reg.	5th	
1981–82	5	Reg. Pref.	1st	
1982–83	4	3ª	10th	
1983–84	4	3ª	7th	
1984–85	4	3ª	12th	
1985–86	4	3ª	10th	
1986–87	4	3ª	16th	
1987–88	4	3ª	5th	
1988–89	4	3ª	4th	
1989–90	4	3ª	11th	
1990–91	4	3ª	12th	
1991–92	4	3ª	5th	
1992–93	4	3ª	15th	First round

Season	Tier	Division	Place	Copa del Rey
1993–94	4	3ª	19th	
1994–95	5	Reg. Pref.	10th	
1995–96	5	Reg. Pref.	19th	
1996–97	6	1ª Reg.	1st	
1997–98	5	Reg. Pref.	20th	
1998–99	6	1ª Reg.	2nd	
1999–2000	5	Reg. Pref.	20th	
2000–01	6	1ª Reg.	15th	
2001–02	6	1ª Reg.	9th	
2002–03	6	1ª Reg.	16th	
2003–04	7	2ª Reg.	2nd	
2004–05	6	1ª Reg.	18th	
2005–06	7	2ª Reg.	1st	
2006–07	6	1ª Aut.	7th	
2007–08	6	1ª Aut.	4th	
2008–09	5	Pref. Aut.	17th	
2009–10	6	1ª Aut.	9th	
2010–11	6	1ª Aut.	2nd	
2011–12	5	Pref. Aut.	7th	
2012–13	5	Pref. Aut.	12th	

Season	Tier	Division	Place	Copa del Rey
2013–14	5	Pref. Aut.	10th	
2014–15	5	Pref. Aut.	1st	
2015–16	4	3ª	6th	
2016–17	4	3ª	13th	
2017–18	4	3ª	7th	
2018–19	4	3ª	5th	
2019–20	4	3ª	4th	
2020–21	4	3ª	7th / 4th	
2021–22	5	3ª RFEF	4th	
2022–23	5	3ª Fed.	15th	
2023–24	6	Pref.	9th	
2024–25	6	Pref. Futgal	1st	
2025–26	5	3ª Fed.	11th	
2026–27	5	3ª Fed.		

- 18 seasons in Tercera División
- 4 seasons in Tercera Federación/Tercera División RFEF
