= Viveiro CF =

Viveiro
- Full name: Viveiro Club de Fútbol
- Founded: 23 November 1923; 102 years ago
- Stadium: Estadio Cantarrana
- Capacity: 1,000
- President: Luis del Río
- Head coach: Marcos Pereiro
- League: Tercera Federación – Group 1
- 2025–26: Tercera Federación – Group 1, 14th of 18
Home colours	Away colours

Viveiro Club de Fútbol is a football club based in Viveiro in the autonomous community of Galicia.

== History ==
Founded in 1923.

== Current league ==
Viveiro currently plays in Tercera Federación – Group 1.

== Season to season ==
Season	Tier	Division	Place	Copa del Rey
1929–1955	—	Regional	—	
1955–56	4	Serie A	9th	
1956–57	5	1ª Reg.		
1957–58	4	Serie A	2nd	
1958–59	4	3ª	15th	
1959–60	4	3ª	7th	
1960–61	4	3ª	5th	
1961–62	4	3ª	9th	
1962–63	4	3ª	15th	
1963–64	4	Serie A	2nd	
1964–65	DNP			
1965–66	DNP			
1966–67	5	1ª Reg.	1st	
1967–68	5	1ª Reg.		
1968–69	5	1ª Reg.	2nd	
1969–70	5	1ª Reg.		
1970–71	5	1ª Reg.	1st	
1971–72	5	1ª Reg.	3rd	
1972–73	5	1ª Reg.	1st	
1973–74	5	1ª Reg.	2nd	

Season	Tier	Division	Place	Copa del Rey
1974–75	5	1ª Reg.	10th	
1975–76	5	1ª Reg.	4th	
1976–77	4	Serie A	19th	
1977–78	6	1ª Reg.	1st	
1978–79	6	1ª Reg.	8th	
1979–80	6	1ª Reg.	2nd	
1980–81	5	Reg. Pref.	1st	
1981–82	4	3ª	7th	
1982–83	4	3ª	13th	
1983–84	4	3ª	10th	
1984–85	4	3ª	8th	
1985–86	4	3ª	5th	
1986–87	4	3ª	19th	First round
1987–88	5	Reg. Pref.	1st	
1988–89	4	3ª	9th	
1989–90	4	3ª	5th	
1990–91	4	3ª	8th	First round
1991–92	4	3ª	13th	First round
1992–93	4	3ª	2nd	
1993–94	4	3ª	4th	First round

Season	Tier	Division	Place	Copa del Rey
1994–95	4	3ª	2nd	
1995–96	4	3ª	7th	
1996–97	4	3ª	4th	
1997–98	4	3ª	10th	
1998–99	4	3ª	4th	
1999–2000	4	3ª	13th	
2000–01	4	3ª	11th	
2001–02	4	3ª	17th	
2002–03	4	3ª	19th	
2003–04	5	Reg. Pref.	3rd	
2004–05	4	3ª	11th	
2005–06	4	3ª	18th	
2006–07	5	Pref. Aut.	6th	
2007–08	5	Pref. Aut.	16th	
2008–09	5	Pref. Aut.	12th	
2009–10	5	Pref. Aut.	12th	
2010–11	5	Pref. Aut.	14th	
2011–12	5	Pref. Aut.	11th	
2012–13	5	Pref. Aut.	6th	
2013–14	5	Pref. Aut.	4th	

Season	Tier	Division	Place	Copa del Rey
2014–15	5	Pref. Aut.	7th	
2015–16	5	Pref.	8th	
2016–17	5	Pref.	8th	
2017–18	5	Pref.	15th	
2018–19	5	Pref.	3rd	
2019–20	5	Pref.	1st	
2020–21	4	3ª	8th / 2nd	
2021–22	5	3ª RFEF	12th	
2022–23	5	3ª Fed.	13th	
2023–24	5	3ª Fed.	10th	
2024–25	5	3ª Fed.	12th	
2025–26	5	3ª Fed.	14th	
2026–27	5	3ª Fed.		

- 29 seasons in Tercera División
- 6 seasons in Tercera Federación/Tercera División RFEF

== Notable former players ==
- (Spain) Manel
- (Spain) Fabri
- (Spain) Zlatan Xavier
