= SD Juvenil de Ponteareas =

Juvenil de Ponteareas
- Full name: Sociedad Deportiva Juvenil de Ponteareas
- Founded: 17 May 1950; 76 years ago
- Stadium: Campo Municipal de Pardellas
- Capacity: 1,000
- President: Enrique González Pedreira
- Head coach: Alejandro Javier Martínez
- League: Preferente Futgal – Group 2
- 2025–26: Preferente Futgal – Group 6, 3rd of 18 (promoted via play-offs)
Home colours

Sociedad Deportiva Juvenil de Ponteareas (Galician: Sociedade Deportiva Xuvenil de Ponteareas), is a Spanish football club based in the municipality of Ponteareas. Founded in 1950, they currently play in Preferente Futgal – Group 2, holding home matches at the Campo Municipal de Pardellas.

== History ==
Old logo

SD Juvenil was founded on the 17 May 1950 by five young men who had decided to set up a sports club. The club was founded as a Sociedad Deportiva, a sports club competing in various disciplines, most notably football, athletics & roller hockey. The name of the club itself, Juvenil (Juvenile), was chosen as in the 1950s the age of majority was 21 years of age and none of the founders were older than 20.

=== Founders ===
- President - Jose Castro Alvarez (Presidente de honor)
- Vicepresident - José Luis Diz
- Secretary - David Díaz Peña
- Treasurer - José Luis Rodríguez Díaz
- Spokesman - Rafael Luis Díaz

== Club crest and colours ==
The club's crest is based on the coat of arms of the municipality of Ponteareas - a lion on the medieval bridge that gives Ponteareas its name (Ponte meaning bridge in Galician) and a church on the left of the crest. The club plays in red shirts, black shorts and red socks.

== Season to season ==
Season	Tier	Division	Place	Copa del Rey
1952–53	5	1ª Reg.		
1953–54	4	Serie A	3rd	
1954–55	4	Serie A	1st	
1955–56	3	3ª	8th	
1956–57	3	3ª	12th	
1957–58	3	3ª	11th	
1958–59	3	3ª	16th	
1959–60	4	Serie A	3rd	
1960–61	4	Serie A	5th	
1961–62	4	Serie A	3rd	
1962–63	4	Serie A	2nd	
1963–64	4	Serie A	8th	
1964–1970	DNP			
1970–71	6	2ª Reg.	6th	
1971–72	6	2ª Reg.	2nd	
1972–73	6	2ª Reg.	6th	
1973–74	6	2ª Reg.	8th	
1974–75	6	2ª Reg.	3rd	
1975–76	6	2ª Reg.	6th	
1976–77	6	2ª Reg.	1st	

Season	Tier	Division	Place	Copa del Rey
1977–78	6	1ª Reg.	13th	
1978–79	7	2ª Reg.	3rd	
1979–80	7	2ª Reg.	5th	
1980–81	7	2ª Reg.	2nd	
1981–82	6	1ª Reg.	6th	
1982–83	6	1ª Reg.	4th	
1983–84	6	1ª Reg.	3rd	
1984–85	6	1ª Reg.	1st	
1985–86	5	Reg. Pref.	4th	
1986–87	5	Reg. Pref.	12th	
1987–88	5	Reg. Pref.	2nd	
1988–89	4	3ª	2nd	
1989–90	4	3ª	19th	
1990–91	5	Reg. Pref.	3rd	
1991–92	5	Reg. Pref.	15th	
1992–93	5	Reg. Pref.	18th	
1993–94	6	1ª Reg.	1st	
1994–95	5	Reg. Pref.	12th	
1995–96	5	Reg. Pref.	18th	
1996–97	6	1ª Reg.	15th	

Season	Tier	Division	Place	Copa del Rey
1997–98	6	1ª Reg.	6th	
1998–99	6	1ª Reg.	9th	
1999–2000	6	1ª Reg.	12th	
2000–01	6	1ª Reg.	17th	
2001–02	7	2ª Reg.	10th	
2002–03	7	2ª Reg.	1st	
2003–04	6	1ª Reg.	5th	
2004–05	6	1ª Reg.	9th	
2005–06	6	1ª Reg.	4th	
2006–07	6	1ª Aut.	3rd	
2007–08	6	1ª Aut.	18th	
2008–09	7	2ª Aut.	2nd	
2009–10	6	1ª Aut.	17th	
2010–11	7	2ª Aut.	16th	
2011–12	8	3ª Aut.	2nd	
2012–13	7	2ª Aut.	16th	
2013–14	8	3ª Aut.	2nd	
2014–15	7	2ª Aut.	1st	
2015–16	6	1ª Aut.	5th	
2016–17	6	1ª Gal.	12th	

Season	Tier	Division	Place	Copa del Rey
2017–18	6	1ª Gal.	3rd	
2018–19	5	Pref.	10th	
2019–20	5	Pref.	11th	
2020–21	5	Pref.	1st	
2021–22	5	3ª RFEF	15th	
2022–23	6	Pref.	3rd	
2023–24	6	Pref.	8th	
2024–25	6	Pref. Futgal	14th	
2025–26	7	1ª Futgal		

- 6 seasons in Tercera División
- 1 season in Tercera División RFEF
