= Meirás CF =

Spanish football club

Meirás
- Full name: Meirás Club de Fútbol
- Founded: 1973; 53 years ago
- Stadium: Campo de Fútbol Misael Prieto
- Capacity: 2,000
- President: Juan F. Rodríguez
- Head coach: Mario López
- League: Primera Futgal – Group 1
- 2025–26: Primera Futgal – Group 1, 9th of 18
Home colours	Away colours	Third colours

Meirás Club de Fútbol is a football team based in Valdoviño, A Coruña, in the autonomous community of Galicia. Founded in 1973, it currently plays in Primera Futgal – Group 1. The club's stadium is Campo de Fútbol Misael Prieto, with the capacity of 2,000 spectators (all seated).

== Season to season ==
Season	Tier	Division	Place	Copa del Rey
1974–75	5	1ª Reg.	6th	
1975–76	5	1ª Reg.	8th	
1976–77	5	1ª Reg.	8th	
1977–78	6	1ª Reg.	7th	
1978–79	7	2ª Reg.	2nd	
1979–80	7	2ª Reg.		
1980–81	6	1ª Reg.	2nd	
1981–82	5	Reg. Pref.	2nd	
1982–83	5	Reg. Pref.	3rd	
1983–84	5	Reg. Pref.	4th	
1984–85	5	Reg. Pref.	5th	
1985–86	5	Reg. Pref.	5th	
1986–87	6	1ª Reg.	1st	
1987–88	6	1ª Reg.	1st	
1988–89	5	Reg. Pref.	6th	
1989–90	5	Reg. Pref.	2nd	
1990–91	4	3ª	17th	
1991–92	4	3ª	15th	
1992–93	4	3ª	20th	
1993–94	7	2ª Reg.	3rd	

Season	Tier	Division	Place	Copa del Rey
1994–95	7	2ª Reg.	12th	
1995–96	7	2ª Reg.	12th	
1996–97	7	2ª Reg.	4th	
1997–98	7	2ª Reg.	5th	
1998–99	7	2ª Reg.	1st	
1999–2000	6	1ª Reg.	3rd	
2000–01	5	Reg. Pref.	17th	
2001–02	6	1ª Reg.	4th	
2002–03	6	1ª Reg.	5th	
2003–04	6	1ª Reg.	12th	
2004–05	6	1ª Reg.	13th	
2005–06	7	2ª Reg.	6th	
2006–07	7	2ª Aut.	5th	
2007–08	7	2ª Aut.	1st	
2008–09	6	1ª Aut.	17th	
2009–10	7	2ª Aut.	5th	
2010–11	7	2ª Aut.	8th	
2011–12	7	2ª Aut.	1st	
2012–13	6	1ª Aut.	11th	
2013–14	6	1ª Aut.	7th	

Season	Tier	Division	Place	Copa del Rey
2014–15	6	1ª Aut.	16th	
2015–16	7	2ª Aut.	9th	
2016–17	7	2ª Gal.	5th	
2017–18	7	2ª Gal.	1st	
2018–19	7	2ª Gal.	3rd	
2019–20	7	2ª Gal.	2nd	
2020–21	DNP			
2021–22	8	2ª Gal.	1st	
2022–23	8	2ª Gal.	3rd	
2023–24	8	2ª Gal.	1st	
2024–25	8	2ª Futgal	1st	
2025–26	7	1ª Futgal		

- 3 seasons in Tercera División
