= CSD Arzúa =

Association football club in Spain

- Full name: Casino Sociedad Deportiva Arzúa
- Short name: CSD Arzúa
- Founded: 1967
- Ground: Municipal O Viso, La Coruña, Galicia, Spain
- Capacity: 2,000
- President: Víctor Gómez
- Head coach: Alberto López
- League: Preferente Futgal– Group 1
- 2025–26: Primera Futgal – Group 2, 1st of 18 (champions)
Home colours

Casino Sociedad Deportiva Arzúa is a Spanish football team located in Arzúa, province of A Coruña, autonomous community of Galicia. Founded in 1967 it currently plays in Preferente Futgal– Group 1, holding home matches at Municipal O Viso with a capacity of 2,000 spectators.

== History ==
The club was founded in August 1967. CSD Arzúa's first promotion to the Tercera División was in May 2019.

== Season to season ==
Season	Tier	Division	Place	Copa del Rey
1968–69	5	1ª Reg.	6th	
1969–70	5	1ª Reg.	4th	
1970–71	5	1ª Reg.	9th	
1971–72	5	1ª Reg.	10th	
1972–73	5	1ª Reg.	11th	
1973–74	6	2ª Reg.	6th	
1974–75	6	2ª Reg.	5th	
1975–76	5	1ª Reg.	3rd	
1976–77	5	1ª Reg.	2nd	
1977–78	6	1ª Reg.	2nd	
1978–79	7	2ª Reg.	6th	
1979–80	7	2ª Reg.	14th	
1980–81	7	2ª Reg.	3rd	
1981–82	7	2ª Reg.	9th	
1982–83	7	2ª Reg.	1st	
1983–84	6	1ª Reg.	5th	
1984–85	5	Reg. Pref.	20th	
1985–86	6	1ª Reg.	4th	
1986–87	5	Reg. Pref.	14th	
1987–88	5	Reg. Pref.	16th	

Season	Tier	Division	Place	Copa del Rey
1988–89	5	Reg. Pref.	18th	
1989–90	6	1ª Reg.	4th	
1990–91	6	1ª Reg.	3rd	
1991–92	6	1ª Reg.	2nd	
1992–93	5	Reg. Pref.	18th	
1993–94	6	1ª Reg.	16th	
1994–95	6	1ª Reg.	10th	
1995–96	6	1ª Reg.	10th	
1996–97	6	1ª Reg.	6th	
1997–98	6	1ª Reg.	8th	
1998–99	6	1ª Reg.	6th	
1999–2000	6	1ª Reg.	2nd	
2000–01	5	Reg. Pref.	17th	
2001–02	6	1ª Reg.	18th	
2002–03	7	2ª Reg.	6th	
2003–04	7	2ª Reg.	4th	
2004–05	7	2ª Reg.	10th	
2005–06	7	2ª Reg.	3rd	
2006–07	7	2ª Aut.	12th	
2007–08	7	2ª Aut.	13th	

Season	Tier	Division	Place	Copa del Rey
2008–09	7	2ª Aut.	8th	
2009–10	7	2ª Aut.	9th	
2010–11	7	2ª Aut.	6th	
2011–12	7	2ª Aut.	1st	
2012–13	6	1ª Aut.	6th	
2013–14	6	1ª Aut.	2nd	
2014–15	5	Pref. Aut.	10th	
2015–16	5	Pref.	3rd	
2016–17	5	Pref.	9th	
2017–18	5	Pref.	7th	
2018–19	5	Pref.	2nd	
2019–20	4	3ª	6th	
2020–21	4	3ª	7th / 1st	
2021–22	5	3ª RFEF	11th	
2022–23	5	3ª Fed.	14th	
2023–24	5	3ª Fed.	18th	
2024–25	6	Pref. Futgal	18th	
2025–26	7	1ª Futgal		

- 2 seasons in Tercera División
- 3 seasons in Tercera Federación/Tercera División RFEF
