= SD Becerreá =

Spanish football club

Becerreá
- Full name: Sociedad Deportiva Becerreá
- Founded: 1985; 41 years ago
- Stadium: Campo Municipal de Becerreá
- Capacity: 300
- President: José Antonio Guerra Castro
- Head coach: Javi Gómez
- League: Primera Futgal – Group 3
- 2025–26: Segunda Futgal – Lugo Group 2, 1st of 16 (champions)
Home colours	Away colours

Sociedad Deportiva Becerreá is a Spanish football club based in Becerreá, Lugo, in the autonomous community of Galicia. It currently plays in Primera Futgal – Group 3, the seventh level of Spanish football, holding home games at Campo Municipal de Becerreá.

== Season to season ==
Season	Tier	Division	Place	Copa del Rey
1985–86	7	2ª Reg.	6th	
1986–87	7	2ª Reg.	16th	
1987–88	7	2ª Reg.	6th	
1988–89	6	1ª Reg.	4th	
1989–90	6	1ª Reg.	1st	
1990–91	6	1ª Reg.	10th	
1991–92	6	1ª Reg.	18th	
1992–93	7	2ª Reg.	3rd	
1993–94	7	2ª Reg.	2nd	
1994–95	6	1ª Reg.	8th	
1995–96	6	1ª Reg.	10th	
1996–97	6	1ª Reg.	15th	
1997–98	6	1ª Reg.	17th	
1998–99	7	2ª Reg.	8th	
1999–2000	7	2ª Reg.	1st	
2000–01	6	1ª Reg.	10th	
2001–02	6	1ª Reg.	16th	
2002–03	7	2ª Reg.	7th	
2003–04	7	2ª Reg.	11th	
2004–05	DNP			

Season	Tier	Division	Place	Copa del Rey
2005–06	DNP			
2006–07	8	3ª Aut.	2nd	
2007–08	7	2ª Aut.	9th	
2008–09	7	2ª Aut.	2nd	
2009–10	6	1ª Aut.	16th	
2010–11	7	2ª Aut.	9th	
2011–12	7	2ª Aut.	8th	
2012–13	7	2ª Aut.	4th	
2013–14	7	2ª Aut.	1st	
2014–15	6	1ª Aut.	5th	
2015–16	6	1ª Aut.	17th	
2016–17	7	2ª Gal.	12th	
2017–18	7	2ª Gal.	8th	
2018–19	7	2ª Gal.	14th	
2019–20	7	2ª Gal.	5th	
2020–21	DNP			
2021–22	8	2ª Gal.	1st	
2022–23	8	2ª Gal.	3rd	
2023–24	8	2ª Gal.	3rd	
2024–25	8	2ª Futgal	3rd	

Season	Tier	Division	Place	Copa del Rey
2025–26	8	2ª Futgal		
