= CD Moaña =

Spanish football club

Moaña
- Full name: Club Deportivo Moaña
- Founded: 1977; 49 years ago
- Stadium: Campo de Fútbol Municipal Iago Aspas Juncal – O Casal
- Capacity: 500
- President: Daniel Verdeal
- Head coach: Rafa Vázquez
- League: Preferente Futgal – Group 2
- 2025–26: Preferente Futgal – Group 2, 13th of 18
Home colours	Away colours

Club Deportivo Moaña is a Spanish football club based in the municipality of Moaña, Galicia. Founded in 1977, it currently plays in Preferente Futgal – Group 2.

== Season to season ==
Season	Tier	Division	Place	Copa del Rey
1977–78	7	2ª Reg.	2nd	
1978–79	7	2ª Reg.	3rd	
1979–80	7	2ª Reg.	5th	
1980–81	6	1ª Reg.	7th	
1981–82	6	1ª Reg.	2nd	
1982–83	5	Reg. Pref.	16th	
1983–84	5	Reg. Pref.	4th	
1984–85	5	Reg. Pref.	5th	
1985–86	5	Reg. Pref.	15th	
1986–87	5	Reg. Pref.	5th	
1987–88	5	Reg. Pref.	7th	
1988–89	5	Reg. Pref.	12th	
1989–90	5	Reg. Pref.	18th	
1990–91	6	1ª Reg.	10th	
1991–92	7	2ª Reg.	3rd	
1992–93	7	2ª Reg.	3rd	
1993–94	7	2ª Reg.	1st	
1994–95	6	1ª Reg.	10th	
1995–96	6	1ª Reg.	15th	
1996–97	6	1ª Reg.	6th	

Season	Tier	Division	Place	Copa del Rey
1997–98	6	1ª Reg.	9th	
1998–99	6	1ª Reg.	3rd	
1999–2000	6	1ª Reg.	10th	
2000–01	6	1ª Reg.	3rd	
2001–02	6	1ª Reg.	4th	
2002–03	6	1ª Reg.	9th	
2003–04	6	1ª Reg.	3rd	
2004–05	6	1ª Reg.	8th	
2005–06	6	1ª Reg.	9th	
2006–07	6	1ª Aut.	2nd	
2007–08	5	Pref. Aut.	18th	
2008–09	6	1ª Aut.	4th	
2009–10	6	1ª Aut.	4th	
2010–11	6	1ª Aut.	7th	
2011–12	6	1ª Aut.	4th	
2012–13	6	1ª Aut.	4th	
2013–14	6	1ª Aut.	5th	
2014–15	6	1ª Aut.	5th	
2015–16	6	1ª Aut.	3rd	
2016–17	5	Pref.	4th	

Season	Tier	Division	Place	Copa del Rey
2017–18	5	Pref.	5th	
2018–19	5	Pref.	6th	
2019–20	5	Pref.	8th	
2020–21	DNP			
2021–22	6	Pref.	12th	
2022–23	7	1ª Gal.	1st	
2023–24	6	Pref.	13th	
2024–25	6	Pref. Futgal	13th	
2025–26	6	Pref. Futgal		

== Football pitches ==
- A Xunqueira (1977–2009)
- O Casal (2009–)

== Notable former players ==
- Jonathan Aspas
- Iago Aspas
- Aitor Aspas
- Cristóbal juncal
- Javi Nogueira
- Fran Palmás
- David Chapela
