= Santiago Castro (footballer, born 1947) =

Spanish footballer

Personal information
- Full name: Santiago Castro Anido
- Date of birth: 16 May 1947 (age 79)
- Place of birth: Mugardos, Spain
- Height: 1.71 m (5 ft 7 in)
- Positions: Midfielder; forward

Youth career
- Galicia Mugardos

Senior career*
| Years | Team | Apps | (Gls) |
| 1965–1966 | Arsenal Ferrol | | |
| 1966–1968 | Ferrol | 59 | (17) |
| 1968–1971 | Barcelona | 19 | (1) |
| 1971–1980 | Celta de Vigo | 276 | (30) |
| Total | | 354 | (48) |

International career
| 1970 | Spain U23 | 1 | (0) |

Managerial career
- 1984–1985: Gran Peña
- * Club domestic league appearances and goals

Santiago Castro Anido (born 16 May 1947) is a Spanish former professional footballer.

== Club career ==
Born in Mugardos, Castro started his career with local side Galicia Mugardos. He played for Arsenal Ferrol, scoring 26 goals and helping the side achieve promotion to the Tercera División. These performances caught the eye of fellow Ferrol-based club Racing de Ferrol.

After good performances with Racing de Ferrol in the Segunda División, Castro was signed by Barcelona at the end of the 1967–68 season. He had supported Barcelona as a child, listing Luis Suárez as an idol. Military service delayed his Barcelona debut, as he was stationed in Cartagena, Barcelona and Madrid. He eventually made his debut at the end of the 1968–69 season, also playing in the UEFA Cup Winners' Cup that season.

In March 1971, he made the move to Celta de Vigo, as part of an exchange deal including Quique Costas. His career in Vigo started well, with a goal on his debut against Real Madrid. He went on to play 328 games in all competitions for Celta.

== Later life ==
Following his retirement from playing, Castro worked as a youth coach at Celta de Vigo, then as part of the background staff of the first team. He also had a brief spell as manager of Gran Peña.
