= Divisiones Regionales de Fútbol in Galicia =

The Divisiones Regionales de Fútbol in the Community of Galicia, are organized by Federación Gallega de Fútbol :

- Preferente Futgal (formerly Prefrente de Galicia) (Level 6 of the Spanish football pyramid)
- Primera Futgal (formerly Primeira Galicia) (Level 7)
- Segunda Futgal (formerly Segunda Galicia) (Level 8)
- Tercera Futgal (formerly Terceira Galicia) (Level 9)

== League chronology ==
Timeline

== Preferente Futgal ==
Preferente Futgal
- Founded: 1970
- Country: Spain
- Number of clubs: 36; two groups of 18
- Level on pyramid: 6
- Promotion to: 3ª Federación – Group 1
- Relegation to: Primera Futgal
- Domestic cup: None
- Website: Official website

The Preferente Futgal (formerly Preferente de Galicia) is one of the lower levels of the Spanish Football League. It is held every year. It stands at the sixth level of Spanish football. All of the clubs are based in the autonomous community of Galicia.

=== League format ===
The league played in two groups of 18 teams each. At the end of the season, the champion from each group are promoted to Tercera Federación - Group 1. The runners-up play a promotion play-off to fill any vacancies in Tercera Federación. Three teams from each group are relegated to Primeira Autonómica. (Additional teams could be relegated if there are more teams relegated to Tercera División than that are promoted; both Tercera División and Autonómica Preferente groups have a limit of 20 clubs.)

=== Current clubs 2026–27 ===
Group North	Group South
Arzúa; Betanzos; Burela; Carral; Chantada; Dubra; Dumbría; Galicia Mugardos; Miño; Negreira; Noia; Órdenes; Paiosaco; Pol; Puebla Galicia; Sigüeiro; Sofán; San Tirso	Alertanavia; Atlántida Matamá; Atlético Arnoia; Auriense; Atios; Barbadás; Beluso; Cultural Areas; Juvenil Ponteareas; Juventud Cambados; Lemos; Marín; Moaña; Porriño Industrial; Ribadumia; Valladares; Verín; Villalonga

=== Champions ===
Season	North Winner	South Winner
2010–11	Betanzos	Lalín
2011–12	Compostela	Barbadás
2012–13	Boiro	Cultural Areas
2013–14	Ribadeo	Ribadumia
2014–15	Negreira	Barco
2015–16	Castro	Villalonga
2016–17	Noia	Cultural Areas
2017–18	SDC Polvorín	UD Ourense
2018–19	As Pontes	Pontellas
2019–20	Viveiro	Ribadumia
2020–21	Noia	Juvenil de Ponteareas
2021–22	Arteixo	UD Ourense
2022–23	Sarriana	Barbadás
2023–24	Noia	Villalonga
2024–25	Atlético Coruña Montañeros	Barco
2025–26	Lalín	Pontevedra B

=== External links ===
- Preferente Autonómica - Norte
- Preferente Autonómica - Sur

== Primera Futgal ==
Primera Futgal
- Founded: Unknown
- Country: Spain
- Number of clubs: 90; 5 groups of 18 each.
- Level on pyramid: 7
- Promotion to: Preferente Futgal
- Relegation to: Segunda Futgal
- Domestic cup: None
- Website: Official website

Primera Futgal (formerly Primeira División Autonómica de Galicia and Primeira Galicia) is the seventh level of the Spanish football league system. It is administered by the Galician Football Federation.

=== League format ===
The league is played in five groups of 18 teams each. At the end of the season, the champion each group are promoted to Autonómica Preferente plus the winner of a playoff tie between the runners-up from groups 1 & 2, runners-up from groups 3 & 4 and runner-up & 3rd place from group 5. Three teams in Group 1 & 2 and two each in Group 3, 4 & 5 are relegated to Segunda Autonómica. (Further relegations may be needed to maintain 18 clubs in each group.)

=== Some teams playing in this level ===
- Arteixo
- Juventud Cambados
- Moaña
- Verín
- Meirás
- Becerreá
- Brollón
- Tomiño

=== External links ===
- Primera Autonómica Grupo 1
- Primera Autonómica Grupo 2
- Primera Autonómica Grupo 3
- Primera Autonómica Grupo 4

== Segunda Futgal ==
Segunda Futgal
- Founded: Unknown
- Country: Spain
- Number of clubs: 13 groups of a maximum of 18
- Level on pyramid: 8
- Promotion to: Primera Futgal
- Relegation to: Tercera Futgal
- Domestic cup: None
- Website: Official website

The Segunda Futgal (formerly Segunda Autonómica de Galicia and Segunda Galicia) is one of the lower levels of the Spanish Football League. It is held every year. It stands at the eighth level of Spanish football. All of the clubs are based in the autonomous community of Galicia.

=== League format ===
The league is played in thirteen groups of 16-18 teams. At the end of the season, the champions from groups 1-6, 12 & 13, the winners of the play-off of the runners-up from groups 1, 2 & 4 and groups 3, 5 & 6 and the champions and runners-up from groups 7-11 are promoted to Primeira Autonómica. Two teams are relegated from groups 1, 3, 7-10 & 12-13, three relegated from 2 & 11, four from 5 & 6 and only one from 4.

== Tercera Futgal ==
Tercera Futgal
- Founded: Unknown
- Country: Spain
- Number of clubs: 19 groups of a maximum of 20
- Level on pyramid: 9
- Promotion to: Segunda Futgal
- Domestic cup: None
- Website: Official website

The Tercera Futgal (formerly Terceira Autonómica de Galicia and Terceira Galicia) is stands at the ninth level of Spanish football. All of the clubs are based in the autonomous community of Galicia.

=== The League ===
The league played in 19 groups of 12-19 teams each. At the end of the season, the champion of each group is promoted to Segunda Autonómica de Galicia plus runners-up from groups 1, 4-5, 11-12 & 18-19; runners-up thru fourth from 13 & 14; the six playoff winners from 3rd-6th's of groups 1, 4, 11-12 & 18-19; seven winners from 2nd-5th's of groups 1, 3 and 6-10; three winners from 2nd-5th's of groups 15-17 and the qualifying-playoff winner between 3rd of group 5 & 2nd worst from Segunda Autonómica group 4.
