= Betanzos CF =

Betanzos
- Full name: Betanzos Club de Fútbol
- Nickname: Brigantium
- Founded: 1952; 74 years ago
- Stadium: Estadio García Hermanos
- Capacity: 5,000
- President: Garrido
- Head coach: Claudio Corbillón
- League: Preferente Futgal – Group 1
- 2025–26: Preferente Futgal – Group 1, 2nd of 18
Home colours	Away colours

Betanzos Club de Fútbol is a football team based in Betanzos in the autonomous community of Galicia. Founded in 1952, they play in the Preferente Futgal – Group 1, holding home matches at Estadio García Hermanos, with a capacity of 5,000 seats.

== History ==
Betanzos were founded as Brigantium Club de Fútbol in 1952, as a replacement to Club Betanzos which folded four years earlier. The club changed to their current name in 1992.

== Season to season ==
Season	Tier	Division	Place	Copa del Rey
1952–53	4	Serie A	4th	
1953–54	4	Serie A	2nd	
1954–55	4	Serie A	1st	
1955–56	3	3ª	10th	
1956–57	3	3ª	16th	
1957–58	DNP			
1958–59	DNP			
1959–60	6	2ª Reg.	3rd	
1960–61	5	1ª Reg.	1st	
1961–62	5	1ª Reg.	1st	
1962–63	5	1ª Reg.	2nd	
1963–64	5	1ª Reg.	1st	
1964–65	4	Serie A	2nd	
1965–66	3	3ª	15th	
1966–67	3	3ª	13th	
1967–68	3	3ª	16th	
1968–69	DNP			
1969–70	DNP			
1970–71	DNP			
1971–72	5	1ª Reg.	9th	

Season	Tier	Division	Place	Copa del Rey
1972–73	5	1ª Reg.	2nd	
1973–74	5	1ª Reg.	1st	
1974–75	5	2ª Reg.	4th	
1975–76	5	2ª Reg.	5th	
1976–77	5	2ª Reg.	6th	
1977–78	6	2ª Reg.	7th	
1978–79	7	2ª Reg.	5th	
1979–80	7	2ª Reg.	1st	
1980–81	6	1ª Reg.	17th	
1981–82	6	1ª Reg.	5th	
1982–83	6	1ª Reg.	12th	
1983–84	6	1ª Reg.	13th	
1984–85	6	1ª Reg.	10th	
1985–86	6	1ª Reg.	8th	
1986–87	5	Reg. Pref.	3rd	
1987–88	5	Reg. Pref.	2nd	
1988–89	4	3ª	13th	
1989–90	4	3ª	8th	
1990–91	4	3ª	15th	
1991–92	4	3ª	18th	

Season	Tier	Division	Place	Copa del Rey
1992–93	5	Reg. Pref.	1st	
1993–94	4	3ª	7th	
1994–95	4	3ª	8th	
1995–96	4	3ª	9th	
1996–97	4	3ª	5th	
1997–98	4	3ª	4th	
1998–99	4	3ª	13th	
1999–2000	4	3ª	5th	
2000–01	4	3ª	7th	
2001–02	4	3ª	3rd	
2002–03	4	3ª	14th	
2003–04	4	3ª	12th	
2004–05	4	3ª	10th	
2005–06	4	3ª	16th	
2006–07	4	3ª	15th	
2007–08	4	3ª	18th	
2008–09	5	Pref. Aut.	3rd	
2009–10	5	Pref. Aut.	4th	
2010–11	5	Pref. Aut.	1st	
2011–12	4	3ª	15th	

Season	Tier	Division	Place	Copa del Rey
2012–13	4	3ª	13th	
2013–14	4	3ª	18th	
2014–15	5	Pref. Aut.	19th	
2015–16	6	1ª Aut.	1st	
2016–17	5	Pref.	13th	
2017–18	5	Pref.	17th	
2018–19	6	1ª Gal.	3rd	
2019–20	6	1ª Gal.	2nd	
2020–21	5	Pref.	4th	
2021–22	6	Pref.	2nd	
2022–23	6	Pref.	2nd	
2023–24	5	3ª Fed.	14th	
2024–25	5	3ª Fed.	18th	
2025–26	6	Pref. Futgal		

- 27 seasons in Tercera División
- 2 seasons in Tercera Federación
