= Atlético Coruña Montañeros CF =

Spanish football team

Montañeros
- Full name: Atlético Coruña Montañeros Club de Fútbol
- Founded: 1968; 2014 (refounded)
- Stadium: Elviña Grande
- Capacity: 1,500
- President: Luis Cousillas
- Head coach: Jairo Arias
- League: Tercera Federación – Group 1
- 2025–26: Tercera Federación – Group 1, 10th of 18
Home colours	Away colours

Atlético Coruña Montañeros Club de Fútbol, known simply as Montañeros, formerly Montañeros Club de Fútbol Banco Gallego, is a Spanish football team based in A Coruña, in the autonomous community of Galicia. Founded in 1968, it plays in Tercera Federación – Group 1, and holds home matches at Complexo Deportivo de Elviña Grande, with a capacity of 1,500 spectators.

== History ==
Montañeros CF old logo

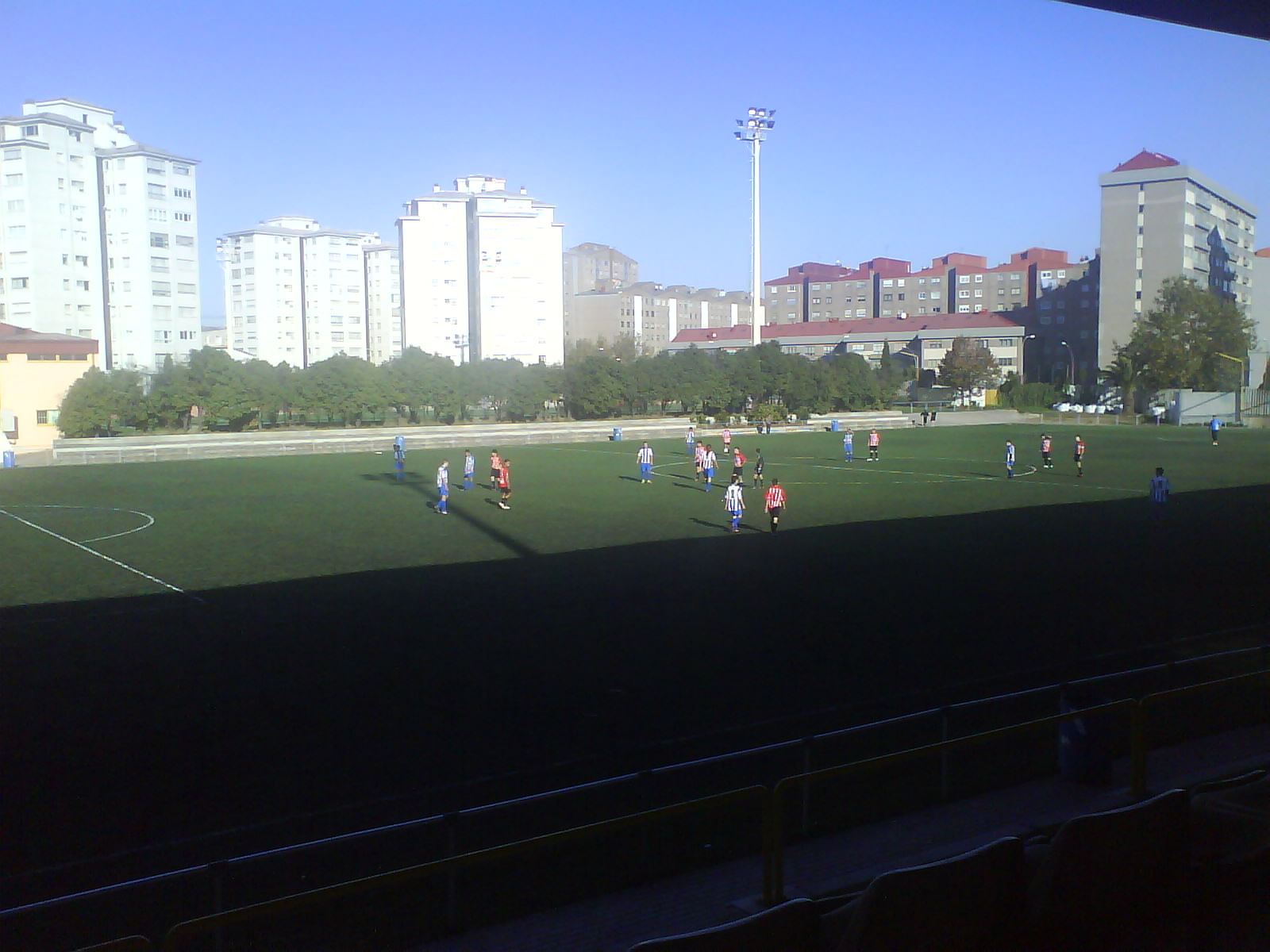
Elviña Grande

Founded in 1968 as Asociación Juvenil Montañeros del Sagrado Corazón, Montañeros only created a football club ten years later, eventually changing name to Club Montañeros del Sagrado Corazón, only taking part of youth competitions. In 1994, as the club was close to bankruptcy, president Fausto Vázquez took over and improved the club's youth setup, changing its name to Montañeros CF.

In 2003, after the success of the Juvenil squad, Montañeros started his senior club with the support of Banco Gallego, changing name again to Montañeros CF Banco Gallego. It first reached Tercera División in 2007, and promoted to Segunda División B in 2009.

On 1 June 2012, after the club's relegation to the fourth division, Montañeros dissolved its senior squad, only working with the youth categories. In 2014, the club was absorbed by Sporting Universidad da Coruña CF (a club founded in 2004), becoming Atlético Coruña CF and changing name to Atlético Coruña Montañeros CF two years later.

=== Background ===
- Asociación Juvenil Montañeros del Sagrado Corazón - (1968–78)
- Club Montañeros del Sagrado Corazón - (1978–94)
- Montañeros CF - (1994–2003)
- Montañeros CF Banco Gallego - (2003–12)
- Atlético Coruña CF - (2014–16)
- Atlético Coruña Montañeros CF - (2016–)

== Season to season ==
=== As Montañeros CF ===
Season	Tier	Division	Place	Copa del Rey
1993–94	8	3ª Reg.	2nd	
1994–95	7	2ª Reg.	4th	
1995–96	7	2ª Reg.	18th	

=== As Montañeros CF Banco Gallego ===
Season	Tier	Division	Place	Copa del Rey
2003–04	8	3ª Reg.	1st	
2004–05	7	2ª Reg.	1st	
2005–06	6	1ª Reg.	1st	
2006–07	5	Pref. Aut.	1st	
2007–08	4	3ª	8th	
2008–09	4	3ª	2nd	
2009–10	3	2ª B	10th	
2010–11	3	2ª B	12th	
2011–12	3	2ª B	18th	

- 3 seasons in Segunda División B
- 2 seasons in Tercera División

=== As Sporting Universidad da Coruña CF ===
Season	Tier	Division	Place	Copa del Rey
2004–05	8	3ª Reg.	6th	
2005–06	8	3ª Reg.	7th	
2006–07	8	3ª Aut.	1st	
2007–08	7	2ª Aut.	3rd	
2008–09	7	2ª Aut.	3rd	
2009–10	7	2ª Aut.	6th	
2010–11	7	2ª Aut.	13th	
2011–12	7	2ª Aut.	11th	
2012–13	7	2ª Aut.	10th	
2013–14	7	2ª Aut.	11th	

=== As Atlético Coruña CF ===
Season	Tier	Division	Place	Copa del Rey
2014–15	7	2ª Aut.	10th	
2015–16	7	2ª Aut.	1st	

=== As Atlético Coruña Montañeros CF ===
Season	Tier	Division	Place	Copa del Rey
2016–17	6	1ª Gal.	6th	
2017–18	6	1ª Gal.	1st	
2018–19	5	Pref.	10th	
2019–20	5	Pref.	17th	
2020–21	5	Pref.	2nd	
2021–22	6	Pref.	3rd	
2022–23	6	Pref.	12th	
2023–24	6	Pref.	6th	
2024–25	6	Pref. Futgal	1st	
2025–26	5	3ª Fed.	10th	
2026–27	5	3ª Fed.		

- 2 seasons in Tercera Federación

== Famous players ==
- (Equatorial Guinea) (Spain) (Ivory Coast) Yago
- (Spain) Rubén Rivera
- (Spain) Nico (youth)
