= Tomiño FC =

Spanish football club

Tomiño
- Full name: Tomiño Fútbol Club
- Founded: 19 May 1934; 92 years ago
- Stadium: Campo Municipal O Alivio
- Capacity: 2,000
- President: Aitor Bouzada
- Head coach: Gelo
- League: Primera Futgal – Group 6
- 2025–26: Primera Futgal – Group 6, 15th of 18
Home colours	Away colours

Tomiño Fútbol Club is a Spanish football club based in the municipality of Tomiño. Founded in 1934, they currently play in Primera Futgal – Group 6.

== Season to season ==
Season	Tier	Division	Place	Copa del Rey
1934–1962	—	Regional	—	
1962–63	5	1ª Reg.	1st	
1963–64	5	1ª Reg.	7th	
1964–65	5	1ª Reg.	6th	
1965–66	5	1ª Reg.	4th	
1966–67	5	1ª Reg.	14th	
1967–68	5	1ª Reg.	12th	
1968–69	6	2ª Reg.	12th	
1969–70	6	2ª Reg.	7th	
1970–71	6	2ª Reg.	1st	
1971–72	5	1ª Reg.	10th	
1972–73	6	2ª Reg.	3rd	
1973–74	6	2ª Reg.	1st	
1974–75	5	1ª Reg.	7th	
1975–76	5	1ª Reg.	8th	
1976–77	5	1ª Reg.	12th	
1977–78	7	2ª Reg.	3rd	
1978–79	7	2ª Reg.	12th	
1979–80	7	2ª Reg.	8th	
1980–81	7	2ª Reg.	14th	

Season	Tier	Division	Place	Copa del Rey
1981–82	7	2ª Reg.	8th	
1982–83	7	2ª Reg.	3rd	
1983–84	7	2ª Reg.	1st	
1984–85	6	1ª Reg.	5th	
1985–86	6	1ª Reg.	5th	
1986–87	6	1ª Reg.	1st	
1987–88	5	Reg. Pref.	9th	
1988–89	5	Reg. Pref.	2nd	
1989–90	5	Reg. Pref.	13th	
1990–91	6	1ª Reg.	2nd	
1991–92	5	Reg. Pref.	4th	
1992–93	5	Reg. Pref.	3rd	
1993–94	5	Reg. Pref.	4th	
1994–95	5	Reg. Pref.	19th	
1995–96	5	Reg. Pref.	8th	
1996–97	5	Reg. Pref.	17th	
1997–98	6	1ª Reg.	2nd	
1998–99	5	Reg. Pref.	14th	
1999–2000	5	Reg. Pref.	16th	
2000–01	6	1ª Reg.	5th	

Season	Tier	Division	Place	Copa del Rey
2001–02	6	1ª Reg.	14th	
2002–03	6	1ª Reg.	7th	
2003–04	6	1ª Reg.	1st	
2004–05	5	Reg. Pref.	10th	
2005–06	5	Reg. Pref.	15th	
2006–07	5	Pref. Aut.	10th	
2007–08	5	Pref. Aut.	9th	
2008–09	5	Pref. Aut.	14th	
2009–10	5	Pref. Aut.	18th	
2010–11	6	1ª Aut.	1st	
2011–12	5	Pref. Aut.	18th	
2012–13	6	1ª Aut.	17th	
2013–14	7	2ª Aut.	12th	
2014–15	7	2ª Aut.	16th	
2015–16	8	3ª Aut.	1st	
2016–17	7	2ª Gal.	10th	
2017–18	7	2ª Gal.	9th	
2018–19	7	2ª Gal.	8th	
2019–20	7	2ª Gal.	2nd	
2020–21	DNP			

Season	Tier	Division	Place	Copa del Rey
2021–22	7	1ª Gal.	9th	
2022–23	8	2ª Gal.	12th	
2023–24	8	2ª Gal.	7th	
2024–25	7	1ª Futgal	12th	
2025–26	7	1ª Futgal		
