= UD Barbadás =

Spanish football club

Barbadás
- Full name: Unión Deportiva Barbadás
- Founded: 1998; 28 years ago
- Stadium: Estadio Os Carrís
- Capacity: 1,500
- President: Pablo Campelo
- Head coach: Luis Vilachá
- League: Preferente Futgal – Group 1
- 2025–26: Tercera Federación – Group 1, 18th of 18 (relegated)
Home colours	Away colours

Unión Deportiva Barbadás is a football team based in Barbadás in the autonomous community of Galicia. Founded in 1998, they play in Preferente Futgal – Group 1, holding home matches at the Estadio Os Carrís.

== Accomplishments ==
- 2011–12 Preferente Autónomica group south champion
- 2011–12 Preferente Autónomica overall runners-up

== Season to season ==
Season	Tier	Division	Place	Copa del Rey
1998–99	7	2ª Reg.	5th	
1999–2000	7	2ª Reg.	1st	
2000–01	6	1ª Reg.	3rd	
2001–02	6	1ª Reg.	10th	
2002–03	6	1ª Reg.	6th	
2003–04	5	Reg. Pref.	16th	
2004–05	5	Reg. Pref.	17th	
2005–06	5	Reg. Pref.	12th	
2006–07	5	Pref. Aut.	9th	
2007–08	5	Pref. Aut.	2nd	
2008–09	5	Pref. Aut.	2nd	
2009–10	5	Pref. Aut.	9th	
2010–11	5	Pref. Aut.	3rd	
2011–12	5	Pref. Aut.	1st	
2012–13	4	3ª	14th	
2013–14	4	3ª	11th	
2014–15	4	3ª	13th	
2015–16	4	3ª	14th	
2016–17	4	3ª	11th	
2017–18	4	3ª	18th	

Season	Tier	Division	Place	Copa del Rey
2018–19	5	Pref.	3rd	
2019–20	5	Pref.	6th	
2020–21	5	Pref.	2nd	
2021–22	6	Pref.	2nd	
2022–23	6	Pref.	1st	First round
2023–24	5	3ª Fed.	9th	
2024–25	5	3ª Fed.	15th	
2025–26	5	3ª Fed.	18th	
2026–27	6	Pref.		

- 6 seasons in Tercera División
- 3 seasons in Tercera Federación
