= Atlético Arteixo =

Spanish football club

- Full name: Club Atlético Arteixo
- Founded: 1949; 77 years ago
- Stadium: Campo Municipal Ponte dos Brozos
- Capacity: 2,000
- President: Fran Gil
- Head coach: Noé López
- League: Tercera Federación – Group 1
- 2025–26: Tercera Federación – Group 1, 3rd of 18
- Website: http://www.atleticoarteixo.es/
Home colours	Away colours

Club Atlético Arteixo is a Spanish football team based in Arteixo, A Coruña, in the autonomous community of Galicia. Founded in 1949 it currently plays in Tercera Federación – Group 1, holding home games at Campo Municipal Ponte dos Brozos, with a capacity of 2,000 spectators.

In 2004–05, after four seasons in Tercera División and 51 in the regional leagues, Atlético Arteixo played in Segunda División B, after beating Real Oviedo in the last round of the 2003–04 promotion playoffs. At the end of the season, in which it ranked last, the club was relegated two divisions, to Preferente Grupo Norte – Galicia, due to unpaid wages to players.

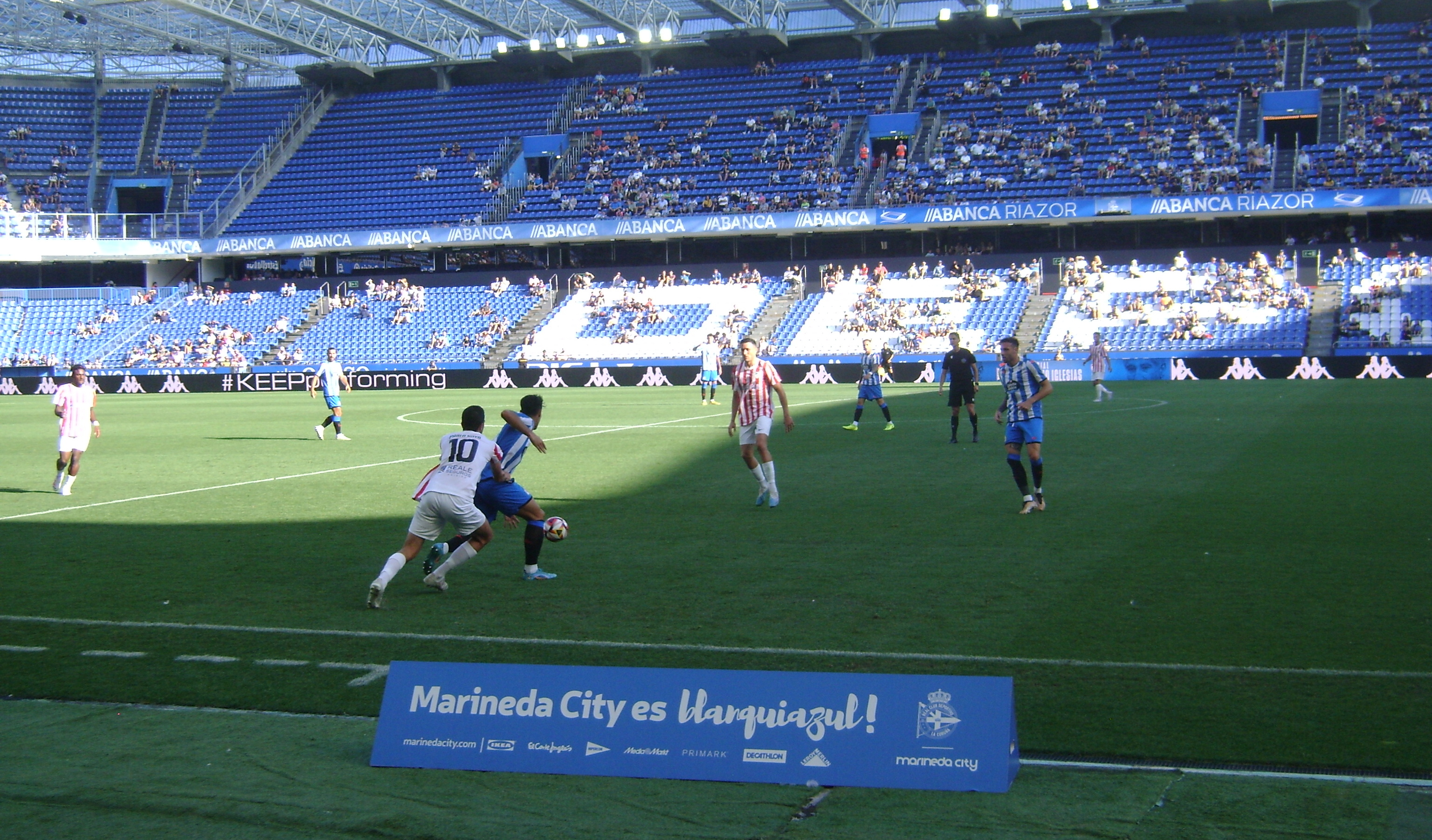
Deportivo de La Coruña vs. Atlético Arteixo.

== Season to season ==
Season	Tier	Division	Place	Copa del Rey
1949–1971	—	Regional	—	
1971–72	6	2ª Reg.	3rd	
1972–73	6	2ª Reg.	6th	
1973–74	6	2ª Reg.	5th	
1974–75	5	1ª Reg.	5th	
1975–76	5	1ª Reg.	9th	
1976–77	5	1ª Reg.	2nd	
1977–78	6	1ª Reg.	2nd	
1978–79	7	2ª Reg.	3rd	
1979–80	7	2ª Reg.	4th	
1980–81	7	2ª Reg.	1st	
1981–82	6	1ª Reg.		
1982–83	6	1ª Reg.	1st	
1983–84	6	1ª Reg.	2nd	
1984–85	6	1ª Reg.	1st	
1985–86	5	Reg. Pref.	9th	
1986–87	6	1ª Reg.	1st	
1987–88	5	Reg. Pref.	10th	
1988–89	5	Reg. Pref.	5th	
1989–90	5	Reg. Pref.	13th	

Season	Tier	Division	Place	Copa del Rey
1990–91	5	Reg. Pref.	11th	
1991–92	5	Reg. Pref.	7th	
1992–93	5	Reg. Pref.	9th	
1993–94	5	Reg. Pref.	4th	
1994–95	5	Reg. Pref.	6th	
1995–96	5	Reg. Pref.	3rd	
1996–97	5	Reg. Pref.	3rd	
1997–98	5	Reg. Pref.	1st	
1998–99	4	3ª	17th	
1999–2000	5	Reg. Pref.	6th	
2000–01	5	Reg. Pref.	2nd	
2001–02	4	3ª	12th	
2002–03	4	3ª	3rd	
2003–04	4	3ª	2nd	
2004–05	3	2ª B	20th	
2005–06	5	Reg. Pref.	19th	
2006–07	6	1ª Aut.	12th	
2007–08	6	1ª Aut.	4th	
2008–09	6	1ª Aut.	10th	
2009–10	6	1ª Aut.	5th	

Season	Tier	Division	Place	Copa del Rey
2010–11	6	1ª Aut.	7th	
2011–12	6	1ª Aut.	5th	
2012–13	6	1ª Aut.	3rd	
2013–14	6	1ª Aut.	1st	
2014–15	5	Pref. Aut.	5th	
2015–16	5	Pref.	6th	
2016–17	5	Pref.	11th	
2017–18	5	Pref.	8th	
2018–19	5	Pref.	9th	
2019–20	5	Pref.	6th	
2020–21	5	Pref.	7th	
2021–22	6	Pref.	1st	
2022–23	5	3ª Fed.	7th	
2023–24	5	3ª Fed.	6th	
2024–25	5	3ª Fed.	14th	
2025–26	5	3ª Fed.	3rd	
2026–27	5	3ª Fed.		

- 1 season in Segunda División B
- 4 seasons in Tercera División
- 5 seasons in Tercera Federación

== Notable former players ==
- (Spain) Javier Manjarín
- (Spain) Nando
