= CD Cultural Areas =

Spanish football club

Cultural Areas
- Full name: Club Deportivo Cultural Areas
- Founded: 1967; 59 years ago
- Stadium: Campo Municipal A Lomba
- Capacity: 1,000
- President: Domingo Freitas "Mingos"
- Head coach: Yago Yao
- League: Preferente Futgal – Group 2
- 2025–26: Preferente Futgal – Group 2, 7th of 18
Home colours

Club Deportivo Cultural Areas is a Spanish football club based in the parish of Areas, Ponteareas, Galicia. Founded in 1967, the team plays in Preferente Futgal – Group 2. The club played their home games at Campo Municipal A Lomba, which has a capacity of 1,000 spectators.

== Season to season ==
Season	Tier	Division	Place	Copa del Rey
1968–69	6	2ª Reg.	8th	
1969–70	6	2ª Reg.	10th	
1970–71	6	2ª Reg.	2nd	
1971–72	6	2ª Reg.	1st	
1972–73	5	1ª Reg.	11th	
1973–74	6	2ª Reg.	6th	
1974–75	6	2ª Reg.	6th	
1975–76	6	2ª Reg.	4th	
1976–77	6	2ª Reg.	6th	
1977–78	7	2ª Reg.	2nd	
1978–79	7	2ª Reg.	8th	
1979–80	7	2ª Reg.	11th	
1980–81	7	2ª Reg.	1st	
1981–82	6	1ª Reg.	19th	
1982–83	7	2ª Reg.	12th	
1983–84	7	2ª Reg.	14th	
1984–85	7	2ª Reg.	8th	
1985–86	6	1ª Reg.	8th	
1986–87	6	1ª Reg.	9th	
1987–88	6	1ª Reg.	19th	

Season	Tier	Division	Place	Copa del Rey
1988–89	7	2ª Reg.	1st	
1989–90	6	1ª Reg.	2nd	
1990–91	5	Reg. Pref.	17th	
1991–92	6	1ª Reg.	17th	
1992–93	7	2ª Reg.	2nd	
1993–94	7	2ª Reg.	5th	
1994–95	7	2ª Reg.	1st	
1995–96	6	1ª Reg.	20th	
1996–97	7	2ª Reg.	5th	
1997–98	7	2ª Reg.	15th	
1998–99	7	2ª Reg.	3rd	
1999–2000	7	2ª Reg.	1st	
2000–01	6	1ª Reg.	4th	
2001–02	6	1ª Reg.	5th	
2002–03	6	1ª Reg.	2nd	
2003–04	5	Reg. Pref.	5th	
2004–05	5	Reg. Pref.	15th	
2005–06	5	Reg. Pref.	13th	
2006–07	5	Pref. Aut.	12th	
2007–08	5	Pref. Aut.	10th	

Season	Tier	Division	Place	Copa del Rey
2008–09	5	Pref. Aut.	1st	
2009–10	4	3ª	13th	
2010–11	4	3ª	15th	
2011–12	4	3ª	18th	
2012–13	5	Pref. Aut.	1st	
2013–14	4	3ª	16th	
2014–15	4	3ª	18th	
2015–16	5	Pref.	12th	
2016–17	5	Pref.	1st	
2017–18	4	3ª	16th	
2018–19	5	Pref.	12th	
2019–20	5	Pref.	3rd	
2020–21	5	Pref.	2nd	
2021–22	6	Pref.	3rd	
2022–23	6	Pref.	14th	
2023–24	6	Pref.	10th	
2024–25	6	Pref. Futgal	7th	
2025–26	6	Pref. Futgal		

- 6 seasons in Tercera División
