= Verín CF =

Spanish football club

Verín
- Full name: Verín Club de Fútbol
- Founded: 25 May 1971; 55 years ago
- Stadium: Campo de Fútbol Xosé Argiz
- Capacity: 2,000
- President: Luis Ossorio
- Head coach: Vítor Pereira
- League: Preferente Futgal – Group 2
- 2025–26: Primera Futgal – Group 4, 1st of 18 (champions)
Home colours	Away colours

Verín Club de Fútbol is a Spanish football team based in Verín, in the autonomous community of Galicia. Founded in 1971, it plays in Preferente Futgal – Group 2, holding home matches at Campo de Fútbol Xosé Argiz, which has a capacity of 2,000 spectators.

== Season to season ==
Season	Tier	Division	Place	Copa del Rey
1971–72	5	1ª Reg.	3rd	
1972–73	5	1ª Reg.	5th	
1973–74	5	1ª Reg.		
1974–75	5	1ª Reg.	1st	
1975–76	5	1ª Reg.	4th	
1976–77	5	1ª Reg.	3rd	
1977–78	6	1ª Reg.	2nd	
1978–79	6	1ª Reg.	3rd	
1979–80	6	1ª Reg.	6th	
1980–81	5	Reg. Pref.	3rd	
1981–82	4	3ª	20th	
1982–83	5	Reg. Pref.	3rd	
1983–84	5	Reg. Pref.	3rd	
1984–85	5	Reg. Pref.	9th	
1985–86	5	Reg. Pref.	5th	
1986–87	5	Reg. Pref.	13th	
1987–88	5	Reg. Pref.	12th	
1988–89	5	Reg. Pref.	17th	
1989–90	5	Reg. Pref.	22nd	
1990–91	6	1ª Reg.	13th	

Season	Tier	Division	Place	Copa del Rey
1991–92	6	1ª Reg.	20th	
1992–93	7	2ª Reg.	1st	
1993–94	6	1ª Reg.	6th	
1994–95	6	1ª Reg.	3rd	
1995–96	6	1ª Reg.	5th	
1996–97	6	1ª Reg.	5th	
1997–98	6	1ª Reg.	2nd	
1998–99	5	Reg. Pref.	10th	
1999–2000	5	Reg. Pref.	2nd	
2000–01	4	3ª	9th	
2001–02	4	3ª	8th	
2002–03	4	3ª	10th	
2003–04	4	3ª	4th	
2004–05	4	3ª	20th	
2005–06	5	Reg. Pref.	12th	
2006–07	5	Pref. Aut.	2nd	
2007–08	4	3ª	12th	
2008–09	4	3ª	14th	
2009–10	4	3ª	19th	
2010–11	5	Pref. Aut.	4th	

Season	Tier	Division	Place	Copa del Rey
2011–12	5	Pref. Aut.	12th	
2012–13	5	Pref. Aut.	18th	
2013–14	6	1ª Aut.	2nd	
2014–15	5	Pref. Aut.	2nd	
2015–16	4	3ª	20th	
2016–17	5	Pref.	20th	
2017–18	6	1ª Gal.	3rd	
2018–19	6	1ª Gal.	8th	
2019–20	6	1ª Gal.	1st	
2020–21	5	Pref.	5th	
2021–22	6	Pref.	4th	
2022–23	6	Pref.	17th	
2023–24	7	1ª Gal.	1st	
2024–25	6	Pref. Futgal	16th	
2025–26	7	1ª Futgal		

- 10 seasons in Tercera División

== Notable former coaches ==
- (Bulgaria) Nikola Spasov
