= CD Ribadumia =

Spanish football club

Ribadumia
- Full name: Club Deportivo Ribadumia
- Nickname: Riber
- Founded: 1959; 67 years ago
- Stadium: Campo de Fútbol de A Senra
- Capacity: 4,000
- President: Alberto Vázquez
- Head coach: David Eirín
- League: Preferente Futgal – Group 2
- 2025–26: Primera Futgal – Group 5, 1st of 18 (champions)
| Home colours | Away colours |

Club Deportivo Ribadumia is a Spanish football team based in Ribadumia, Province of Pontevedra, in the autonomous community of Galicia. Founded in 1959 it currently plays in Preferente Futgal – Group 2, holding home games at Campo de Fútbol de A Senra, which has a capacity of 4,000 spectators.

== Season to season ==
| Season | Tier | Division | Place | Copa del Rey |
|---|---|---|---|---|
| 1960–61 | 5 | 1ª Reg. | 11th | |
| 1961–62 | 5 | 1ª Reg. | 12th | |
| 1962–63 | 5 | 1ª Reg. | 8th | |
| 1963–64 | DNP | | | |
| 1964–65 | DNP | | | |
| 1965–66 | 5 | 1ª Reg. | 8th | |
| 1966–67 | 5 | 1ª Reg. | 5th | |
| 1967–68 | 5 | 1ª Reg. | 5th | |
| 1968–69 | 5 | 1ª Reg. | | |
| 1969–70 | 5 | 1ª Reg. | 14th | |
| 1970–71 | 5 | 1ª Reg. | 10th | |
| 1971–72 | 5 | 1ª Reg. | 11th | |
| 1972–73 | 5 | 1ª Reg. | 14th | |
| 1973–74 | 5 | 1ª Reg. | 11th | |
| 1974–75 | 5 | 1ª Reg. | 12th | |
| 1975–76 | 5 | 1ª Reg. | 12th | |
| 1976–77 | 6 | 2ª Reg. | 7th | |
| 1977–78 | 7 | 2ª Reg. | 7th | |
| 1978–79 | 8 | 3ª Reg. | 8th | |
| 1979–80 | 8 | 3ª Reg. | | |

| Season | Tier | Division | Place | Copa del Rey |
|---|---|---|---|---|
| 1980–81 | 8 | 3ª Reg. | 9th | |
| 1981–82 | 8 | 3ª Reg. | 5th | |
| 1982–83 | 8 | 3ª Reg. | 4th | |
| 1983–84 | 8 | 3ª Reg. | | |
| 1984–85 | 8 | 3ª Reg. | | |
| 1985–86 | 7 | 2ª Reg. | 5th | |
| 1986–87 | 7 | 2ª Reg. | 7th | |
| 1987–88 | 7 | 2ª Reg. | 10th | |
| 1988–89 | 7 | 2ª Reg. | 3rd | |
| 1989–90 | 7 | 2ª Reg. | 1st | |
| 1990–91 | 6 | 1ª Reg. | 12th | |
| 1991–92 | 7 | 2ª Reg. | 14th | |
| 1992–93 | 7 | 2ª Reg. | 4th | |
| 1993–94 | 7 | 2ª Reg. | 2nd | |
| 1994–95 | 6 | 1ª Reg. | 17th | |
| 1995–96 | 6 | 1ª Reg. | 13th | |
| 1996–97 | 6 | 1ª Reg. | 4th | |
| 1997–98 | 6 | 1ª Reg. | 4th | |
| 1998–99 | 6 | 1ª Reg. | 8th | |
| 1999–2000 | 6 | 1ª Reg. | 6th | |

| Season | Tier | Division | Place | Copa del Rey |
|---|---|---|---|---|
| 2000–01 | 6 | 1ª Reg. | 7th | |
| 2001–02 | 6 | 1ª Reg. | 9th | |
| 2002–03 | 6 | 1ª Reg. | 15th | |
| 2003–04 | 7 | 2ª Reg. | 1st | |
| 2004–05 | 6 | 1ª Reg. | 14th | |
| 2005–06 | 6 | 1ª Reg. | 3rd | |
| 2006–07 | 6 | 1ª Aut. | 1st | |
| 2007–08 | 5 | Pref. Aut. | 13th | |
| 2008–09 | 5 | Pref. Aut. | 6th | |
| 2009–10 | 5 | Pref. Aut. | 10th | |
| 2010–11 | 5 | Pref. Aut. | 14th | |
| 2011–12 | 5 | Pref. Aut. | 4th | |
| 2012–13 | 5 | Pref. Aut. | 7th | |
| 2013–14 | 5 | Pref. Aut. | 1st | |
| 2014–15 | 4 | 3ª | 7th | |
| 2015–16 | 4 | 3ª | 11th | |
| 2016–17 | 4 | 3ª | 15th | |
| 2017–18 | 4 | 3ª | 12th | |
| 2018–19 | 4 | 3ª | 18th | |
| 2019–20 | 5 | Pref. | 1st | |

| Season | Tier | Division | Place | Copa del Rey |
|---|---|---|---|---|
| 2020–21 | 4 | 3ª | 9th / 6th | First round |
| 2021–22 | 6 | Pref. | 6th | |
| 2022–23 | 6 | Pref. | 6th | |
| 2023–24 | 6 | Pref. | 15th | |
| 2024–25 | 7 | 1ª Futgal | 6th | |
| 2025–26 | 7 | 1ª Futgal | | |

- 6 seasons in Tercera División

== Honours ==
- Preferente Autonómica: 2013–14
