= SDC Galicia de Mugardos =

Galicia de Mugardos
- Full name: Sociedad Deportiva Cultural Galicia de Mugardos
- Founded: 1953
- Ground: Campo Municipal A Pedreira, Mugardos, Galicia, Spain
- Capacity: 1,500
- Chairman: Brath Miraz
- Manager: Moisés Pereiro
- League: Primera Futgal – Group 1
- 2024–25: Preferente Futgal – Group 1, 16th of 18 (relegated)
| Home colours | Away colours |

Sociedad Deportiva Cultural Galicia de Mugardos is a football team based in Mugardos in the autonomous community of Galicia. Founded in 1953, it plays in the Primera Futgal – Group 1. Its stadium is A Pedreira with a capacity of 1,500 spectators.

The club also acted as a reserve team for Racing de Ferrol from 2005 to 2019.

== Season to season ==
| Season | Tier | Division | Place | Copa del Rey |
|---|---|---|---|---|
| 1953–1969 | — | Regional | — | |
| 1969–70 | 5 | 1ª Reg. | 1st | |
| 1970–71 | 5 | 1ª Reg. | 2nd | |
| 1971–72 | 5 | 1ª Reg. | 4th | |
| 1972–73 | 5 | 1ª Reg. | 3rd | |
| 1973–74 | 5 | 1ª Reg. | 3rd | |
| 1974–75 | 5 | 1ª Reg. | 4th | |
| 1975–76 | 5 | 1ª Reg. | 6th | |
| 1976–77 | 5 | 1ª Reg. | 1st | |
| 1977–78 | 6 | 1ª Reg. | 1st | |
| 1978–79 | 6 | 1ª Reg. | 2nd | |
| 1979–80 | 6 | 1ª Reg. | 1st | |
| 1980–81 | 6 | 1ª Reg. | 4th | |
| 1981–82 | 5 | Reg. Pref. | 4th | |
| 1982–83 | 5 | Reg. Pref. | 2nd | |
| 1983–84 | 5 | Reg. Pref. | 9th | |
| 1984–85 | 5 | Reg. Pref. | 6th | |
| 1985–86 | 5 | Reg. Pref. | 6th | |
| 1986–87 | 5 | Reg. Pref. | 13th | |
| 1987–88 | 6 | 1ª Reg. | 6th | |

| Season | Tier | Division | Place | Copa del Rey |
|---|---|---|---|---|
| 1988–89 | 6 | 1ª Reg. | 3rd | |
| 1989–90 | 6 | 1ª Reg. | 4th | |
| 1990–91 | 6 | 1ª Reg. | 3rd | |
| 1991–92 | 6 | 1ª Reg. | 8th | |
| 1992–93 | 6 | 1ª Reg. | 13th | |
| 1993–94 | 6 | 1ª Reg. | 8th | |
| 1994–95 | 6 | 1ª Reg. | 6th | |
| 1995–96 | 6 | 1ª Reg. | 8th | |
| 1996–97 | 6 | 1ª Reg. | 7th | |
| 1997–98 | 6 | 1ª Reg. | 13th | |
| 1998–99 | 6 | 1ª Reg. | 16th | |
| 1999–2000 | 6 | 1ª Reg. | 10th | |
| 2000–01 | 6 | 1ª Reg. | 13th | |
| 2001–02 | 6 | 1ª Reg. | 9th | |
| 2002–03 | 6 | 1ª Reg. | 7th | |
| 2003–04 | 6 | 1ª Reg. | 2nd | |
| 2004–05 | 5 | Reg. Pref. | 18th | |
| 2005–06 | 6 | 1ª Reg. | 3rd | N/A (Note: Reserve team of Racing de Ferrol.) |
| 2006–07 | 6 | 1ª Aut. | 3rd | N/A |
| 2007–08 | 6 | 1ª Aut. | 3rd | N/A |

| Season | Tier | Division | Place | Copa del Rey |
|---|---|---|---|---|
| 2008–09 | 6 | 1ª Aut. | 2nd | N/A |
| 2009–10 | 5 | Pref. Aut. | 9th | N/A |
| 2010–11 | 5 | Pref. Aut. | 13th | N/A |
| 2011–12 | 5 | Pref. Aut. | 16th | N/A |
| 2012–13 | 5 | Pref. Aut. | 10th | N/A |
| 2013–14 | 5 | Pref. Aut. | 10th | N/A |
| 2014–15 | 5 | Pref. Aut. | 2nd | N/A |
| 2015–16 | 4 | 3ª | 17th | N/A |
| 2016–17 | 5 | Pref. | 14th | N/A |
| 2017–18 | 6 | 1ª Gal. | 5th | N/A |
| 2018–19 | 6 | 1ª Gal. | 1st | N/A |
| 2019–20 | 5 | Pref. | 5th | |
| 2020–21 | DNP | | | |
| 2021–22 | 6 | Pref. | 5th | |
| 2022–23 | 6 | Pref. | 8th | |
| 2023–24 | 6 | Pref. | 10th | |
| 2024–25 | 6 | Pref. Futgal | 16th | |
| 2025–26 | 7 | 1ª Futgal | | |

- 1 season in Tercera División
