= UD Atios =

Atios
- Full name: Unión Deportiva Atios
- Founded: 4 August 1969; 57 years ago
- Stadium: Campo de Fútbol do Carballo
- Capacity: 500
- President: José Cebreiro
- Head coach: Lino
- League: Preferente Futgal – Group 2
- 2025–26: Preferente Futgal – Group 2, 3rd of 18
Home colours	Away colours

Unión Deportiva Atios, is a Spanish football club based in Atios, in the municipality of O Porriño. Founded in 1969, they currently play in Preferente Futgal – Group 2, holding home matches at the Campo de Fútbol do Carballo.

== History ==
Founded in 1969, Atios first reached the Regional Preferente in 1997. After being relegated in 2001, the club only returned to the division (now named Preferente Autonómica) in 2010.

In April 2020, Atios achieved a first-ever promotion to Tercera División, after the Royal Galician Football Federation confirmed that the promotions from the Preferente would be respected. In June 2021, the club's relegation was mathematically confirmed.

== Season to season ==
Season	Tier	Division	Place	Copa del Rey
1970–71	6	2ª Reg.	8th	
1971–72	6	2ª Reg.	8th	
1972–73	6	2ª Reg.	4th	
1973–74	6	3ª Reg.	4th	
1974–75	6	3ª Reg.	7th	
1975–76	6	3ª Reg.	1st	
1976–77	5	2ª Reg.	11th	
1977–78	6	2ª Reg.	10th	
1978–79	7	2ª Reg.		
1979–80	7	2ª Reg.	10th	
1980–81	7	2ª Reg.	8th	
1981–82	7	2ª Reg.	11th	
1982–83	7	2ª Reg.		
1983–84	7	2ª Reg.		
1984–85	7	2ª Reg.		
1985–86	7	2ª Reg.		
1986–87	7	2ª Reg.		
1987–88	7	2ª Reg.		
1988–89	7	2ª Reg.	9th	
1989–90	7	2ª Reg.	16th	

Season	Tier	Division	Place	Copa del Rey
1990–91	7	2ª Reg.	14th	
1991–92	8	3ª Reg.	2nd	
1992–93	7	2ª Reg.	13th	
1993–94	7	2ª Reg.	2nd	
1994–95	6	1ª Reg.	7th	
1995–96	6	1ª Reg.	3rd	
1996–97	6	1ª Reg.	2nd	
1997–98	5	Reg. Pref.	19th	
1998–99	6	1ª Reg.	11th	
1999–2000	6	1ª Reg.	2nd	
2000–01	5	Reg. Pref.	19th	
2001–02	6	1ª Reg.	16th	
2002–03	7	2ª Reg.	3rd	
2003–04	7	2ª Reg.	6th	
2004–05	7	2ª Reg.	1st	
2005–06	6	1ª Reg.	7th	
2006–07	6	1ª Aut.	4th	
2007–08	6	1ª Aut.	9th	
2008–09	6	1ª Aut.	5th	
2009–10	6	1ª Aut.	2nd	

Season	Tier	Division	Place	Copa del Rey
2010–11	5	Pref. Aut.	15th	
2011–12	5	Pref. Aut.	8th	
2012–13	5	Pref. Aut.	9th	
2013–14	5	Pref. Aut.	17th	
2014–15	5	Pref. Aut.	11th	
2015–16	5	Pref.	5th	
2016–17	5	Pref.	12th	
2017–18	5	Pref.	3rd	
2018–19	5	Pref.	3rd	
2019–20	5	Pref.	2nd	
2020–21	4	3ª	11th / 9th	
2021–22	6	Pref.	7th	
2022–23	6	Pref.	5th	
2023–24	6	Pref.	11th	
2024–25	6	Pref. Futgal	4th	
2025–26	6	Pref. Futgal		

- 1 season in Tercera División
