= CF Agrupación Estudiantil =

Association football club in Spain

Estudiantil
- Full name: Club de Fútbol Agrupación Estudiantil-Vista Alegre
- Founded: 1981
- Dissolved: 2022
- Ground: Santa Isabel, Santiago de Compostela, Galicia, Spain
- Capacity: 1,000
- President: Manuel Varela
- Manager: Gelucho
- 2021–22: Preferente de Galicia North – Group A, 12th of 12 (relegated)
Home colours	Away colours

Club de Fútbol Agrupación Estudiantil-Vista Alegre was a Spanish football team based in Santiago de Compostela, in the autonomous community of Galicia. Founded in 1981, the club was dissolved in 2022.

== History ==
Founded in 1981 in Loimil, A Estrada, Estudiantil played in the regional leagues before achieving promotion to Preferente de Galicia in April 2013. In the 2016–17 season, the club finished three points shy of the first place, which would grant them promotion to Tercera División; they tried to contest a match against CSD Arzúa as the club fielded an ineligible player in September 2016, and while the Competitions Committee of the Galician Football Federation ruled against Estudiantil, the Appeals Committee ruled in favor of the club, granting them the three points of that match (which Arzúa won).

In December 2016, the Galician Committee for Sports Justice ruled in favor of Arzúa, removing those three points from Estudiantil; the club subsequently reported the case in ordinary justice, but the decision was again ruled against them in December 2018. Estudiantil took the case to the High Court of Justice of Galicia, with the court sentencing in favor of the club and giving them the right to play in Tercera División in July 2019, and they reached an agreement with the Galician Federation shortly after, playing the 2019–20 campaign in Terceira Galicia (the lowest tier in regional football) before being included in the fourth division for the 2020–21 season.

In June 2020, Estudiantil reached an agreement with Vista Alegre SD, changing name to CF Agrupación Estudiantil-Vista Alegre and moving to Santiago de Compostela; Vista Alegre also became their reserve team. The club suffered immediate relegation, and after another relegation from the Preferente, the club ceased activities in 2022.

== Season to season ==
Season	Tier	Division	Place	Copa del Rey
1981–82	8	3ª Reg.	4th	
1982–83	8	3ª Reg.	14th	
1983–84	8	3ª Reg.	1st	
1984–85	7	2ª Reg.		
1985–86	8	3ª Reg.	6th	
1986–87	8	3ª Reg.	2nd	
1987–88	7	2ª Reg.	14th	
1988–89	7	2ª Reg.	14th	
1989–90	7	2ª Reg.	15th	
1990–91	7	2ª Reg.	15th	
1991–92	8	3ª Reg.	6th	
1992–93	8	3ª Reg.	10th	
1993–94	8	3ª Reg.	7th	
1994–95	8	3ª Reg.	13th	
1995–96	8	3ª Reg.	11th	
1996–97	8	3ª Reg.	10th	
1997–98	8	3ª Reg.	13th	
1998–99	8	3ª Reg.	11th	
1999–2000	8	3ª Reg.	9th	
2000–01	8	3ª Reg.	10th	

Season	Tier	Division	Place	Copa del Rey
2001–02	8	3ª Reg.	5th	
2002–03	8	3ª Reg.	7th	
2003–04	8	3ª Reg.	4th	
2004–05	8	3ª Reg.	5th	
2005–06	8	3ª Reg.	3rd	
2006–07	8	3ª Aut.	8th	
2007–08	8	3ª Aut.	5th	
2008–09	8	3ª Aut.	2nd	
2009–10	7	2ª Aut.	1st	
2010–11	6	1ª Aut.	11th	
2011–12	6	1ª Aut.	10th	
2012–13	6	1ª Aut.	1st	
2013–14	5	Pref. Aut.	6th	
2014–15	5	Pref. Aut.	13th	
2015–16	5	Pref.	14th	
2016–17	5	Pref.	3rd	
2017–18	5	Pref.	10th	
2018–19	5	Pref.	20th	
2019–20	8	3ª Gal.	11th	
2020–21	4	3ª	9th / 7th	

Season	Tier	Division	Place	Copa del Rey
2021–22	6	Pref.	12th	

- 1 season in Tercera División
