= Urgatzi KK =

Association football club in Spain

Urgatzi
- Full name: Urgatzi Kirol Kluba
- Founded: 1973
- Ground: Olabide, Vitoria-Gasteiz, Basque Country, Spain
- Capacity: 1,000
- President: Jon Aizpurua
- Manager: Eneko Martínez
- League: Regional Preferente
- 2024–25: División de Honor, 15th of 16 (relegated)
Home colours	Away colours

Urgatzi Kirol Kluba is a Spanish football club based in Vitoria-Gasteiz, in the autonomous community of Basque Country. Founded in 1973, they play in the Regional Preferente, holding home games at Futbol Zelaia Olabide.

The club belongs to Olabide ikastola.

== History ==
Founded in 1973 as Club Deportivo Urgatzi, the club was renamed Urgatzi Kirol Elkartea in 2000, and to Lasarteko Olabide Ikastola Kirol Elkartea in 2007. In 2019, the club was renamed Urgatzi Kirol Kluba, and achieved a first-ever promotion in June 2020.

== Season to season ==
Season	Tier	Division	Place	Copa del Rey
1991–92	6	1ª Reg.	5th	
1992–93	6	1ª Reg.	4th	
1993–94	5	Reg. Pref.	17th	
1994–95	6	1ª Reg.	6th	
1995–96	6	1ª Reg.	12th	
1996–2010	DNP			
2010–11	6	1ª Reg.	11th	
2011–12	6	1ª Reg.	2nd	
2012–13	6	1ª Reg.	6th	
2013–14	6	1ª Reg.	7th	
2014–15	6	1ª Reg.	5th	
2015–16	6	1ª Reg.	3rd	
2016–17	5	Reg. Pref.	8th	
2017–18	5	Reg. Pref.	8th	
2018–19	5	Reg. Pref.	4th	
2019–20	5	Reg. Pref.	1st	
2020–21	4	3ª	11th / 10th	
2021–22	6	Reg. Pref.	1st	
2022–23	6	Div. Hon.	5th	
2023–24	6	Div. Hon.	11th	

Season	Tier	Division	Place	Copa del Rey
2024–25	6	Div. Hon.	15th	
2025–26	7	Reg. Pref.		

- 1 season in Tercera División
