= FC Rinconeda Polanco =

Association football club in Spain

Rinconeda Polanco
- Full name: Fútbol Club Rinconeda Polanco
- Founded: 2002
- Dissolved: 2024
- Ground: Municipal, Polanco, Cantabria, Spain
- Capacity: 1,000
- President: Jesús Ríos Iglesias
- 2023–24: Primera Regional, 18th of 18 (relegated)
Home colours	Away colours

Fútbol Club Rinconeda Polanco was a football team based in Polanco, in the autonomous community of Cantabria. Founded in 2002, the team was dissolved in 2024. The club's home ground is Campo de Fútbol Municipal de Polanco, which has a capacity of 1,000 spectators.

== History ==
Founded in 2002 after absorbing AD Milagrosa-Polanco, Rinconeda played in the regional leagues until May 2018, when they achieved a first-ever promotion to Tercera División. After suffering immediate relegation, the club returned to the fourth division at first attempt, but was again relegated.

In 2024, after suffering relegation from the Primera Regional, Rinconeda Polanco ceased activities; after that, Polanco CF became the main club in the city.

== Season to season ==
Season	Tier	Division	Place	Copa del Rey
2002–03	6	1ª Reg.	4th	
2003–04	6	1ª Reg.	3rd	
2004–05	6	1ª Reg.	6th	
2005–06	6	1ª Reg.	6th	
2006–07	6	1ª Reg.	1st	
2007–08	5	Reg. Pref.	6th	
2008–09	5	Reg. Pref.	15th	
2009–10	5	Reg. Pref.	18th	
2010–11	6	1ª Reg.	4th	
2011–12	6	1ª Reg.	5th	
2012–13	5	Reg. Pref.	13th	

Season	Tier	Division	Place	Copa del Rey
2013–14	5	Reg. Pref.	13th	
2014–15	5	Reg. Pref.	9th	
2015–16	5	Reg. Pref.	9th	
2016–17	5	Reg. Pref.	9th	
2017–18	5	Reg. Pref.	3rd	
2018–19	4	3ª	20th	
2019–20	5	Reg. Pref.	3rd	
2020–21	4	3ª	7th / 9th	
2021–22	6	Reg. Pref.	14th	
2022–23	7	1ª Reg.	15th	
2023–24	7	1ª Reg.	18th	

- 2 seasons in Tercera División
