= 2020–21 Tercera División =

Spanish 4th tier association football season

Tercera División
- Season: 2020–21
- Teams: 397

The 2020–21 Tercera División was the last for this league as the fourth tier of Spanish football. It began in October 2020 and ended in June 2021 with the second phase and promotion play-off final in the Canarian group.

Because the Royal Spanish Football Federation (RFEF) suspended the previous season on 11 March 2020 at the onset of the COVID-19 pandemic in Spain, the RFEF announced on 6 May the termination of that season, the revocation of all relegations from the Segunda B and Tercera divisions, and the expansion of both leagues. Each regional federation was allowed to plan its own group for the 2020–21 season and as this season became somewhat shorter than usual, the RFEF recommended the subdivision of each region into two groups in the first phase for ease of scheduling, with a final phase in which the teams regrouped based on initial positions.

Also, the Tercera División dropped down to the fifth level and Segunda B to the fourth, with Tercera suffixing the federation's Spanish initials RFEF to its name and Segunda B replacing the B with those initials after the creation of a new, two-group, 40-team third division called Primera Federación that would begin in 2021–22.

== Competition format ==
- The top eligible teams in each initial group played in the promotion and play-off groups.
- The first placers of each final group qualified for the 2021–22 Copa del Rey. If the placer was a reserve team, the first non-reserve team qualified would join the Copa.
- In each relegation group, at least five or six teams were relegated to regional divisions.

== First phase ==
=== Group 1 – Galicia ===
==== Teams and locations ====
Location of teams of the 2020–21 Tercera División Group 1
Red: Subgroup A; Green: Subgroup B

Team	City	Home ground
Alondras	Cangas	O Morrazo
Arenteiro	O Carballiño	Espiñedo
Arosa	Vilagarcía de Arousa	A Lomba
Arzúa	Arzúa	Do Viso
As Pontes	As Pontes de García Rodríguez	O Poboado
Atios	O Porriño	O Carballo
Barco	O Barco de Valdeorras	Calabagueiros
Bergantiños	Carballo	As Eiroas
Choco	Redondela	Santa Mariña
Deportivo Fabril	Abegondo	Abegondo
Estradense	A Estrada	Municipal
Estudiantil	Santiago de Compostela	Santa Isabel
Fisterra	Fisterra	Ara Solis
Ourense CF	Ourense	O Couto
Paiosaco	A Laracha	Porta Santa
Polvorín	Lugo	O Polvorín
Pontellas	Pontellas, O Porriño	San Campio
Racing Villalbés	Vilalba	A Magdalena
Rápido de Bouzas	Vigo	Baltasar Pujales
Ribadumia	Ribadumia	A Senra
Silva	A Coruña	A Grela
Somozas	As Somozas	Pardiñas
UD Ourense	Ourense	O Couto
Viveiro	Viveiro	Cantarrana

==== Subgroup A ====
Pos	Team	Pld	W	D	L	GF	GA	GD	Pts	Qualification
1	Bergantiños (C)	22	14	6	2	37	16	+21	48	Qualification for the promotion groups
2	Polvorín	22	12	6	4	34	17	+17	42	Qualification for the promotion groups
3	Somozas	22	12	5	5	41	21	+20	41	Qualification for the promotion groups
4	Racing Vilalbés	22	12	4	6	34	26	+8	40	Qualification for the promotion play-off groups
5	Deportivo Fabril	22	9	5	8	41	27	+14	32	Qualification for the promotion play-off groups
6	Silva	22	7	9	6	21	20	+1	30	Qualification for the promotion play-off groups
7	Arzúa	22	7	8	7	32	23	+9	29	Qualification for the relegation groups
8	Viveiro	22	8	4	10	25	39	−14	28	Qualification for the relegation groups
9	Estudiantil	22	4	8	10	27	45	−18	20	Qualification for the relegation groups
10	As Pontes	22	4	7	11	18	40	−22	19	Qualification for the relegation groups
11	Fisterra	22	4	5	13	22	35	−13	17	Qualification for the relegation groups
12	Paiosaco	22	1	9	12	17	40	−23	12	Qualification for the relegation groups

Source: Futbolme.com
Rules for classification: 1) points; 2) head-to-head points; 3) head-to-head goal difference; 4) goal difference; 5) number of goals scored
(C) Champions

==== Subgroup B ====
Pos	Team	Pld	W	D	L	GF	GA	GD	Pts	Qualification
1	Arenteiro (C)	22	13	8	1	33	13	+20	47	Qualification for the promotion groups
2	Arosa	22	11	8	3	27	14	+13	41	Qualification for the promotion groups
3	Alondras	22	9	10	3	31	15	+16	37	Qualification for the promotion groups
4	Estradense	22	8	7	7	35	34	+1	31 (Note: Estradense finished ahead of Choco and Rápido Bouzas on head-to-head points: Estradense – 8 pts, Choco – 4 pts, Rápido Bouzas – 4 pts. Choco finished ahead of Rápido Bouzas on goal difference.)	Qualification for the promotion play-off groups
5	Choco	22	8	7	7	28	22	+6	31	Qualification for the promotion play-off groups
6	Rápido Bouzas	22	8	7	7	25	25	0	31	Qualification for the promotion play-off groups
7	Barco	22	8	6	8	26	27	−1	30	Qualification for the relegation groups
8	Ourense CF	22	8	4	10	33	29	+4	28	Qualification for the relegation groups
9	Ribadumia	22	7	5	10	24	36	−12	26	Qualification for the relegation groups
10	UD Ourense	22	7	4	11	25	32	−7	25	Qualification for the relegation groups
11	Atios	22	4	8	10	18	32	−14	20	Qualification for the relegation groups
12	Pontellas	22	1	6	15	12	38	−26	9	Qualification for the relegation groups

Source: Futbolme.com
Rules for classification: 1) points; 2) head-to-head points; 3) head-to-head goal difference; 4) goal difference; 5) number of goals scored
(C) Champions

=== Group 2 – Asturias ===
==== Teams and locations ====
Location of the 2020–21 Tercera División Group 2
Red: Subgroup A; Green: Subgroup B

Team	City	Home ground
Avilés	Avilés	Román Suárez Puerta
Avilés Stadium	Avilés	Muro de Zaro
Caudal	Mieres	Hermanos Antuña
Ceares	Gijón	La Cruz
Colunga	Colunga	Santianes
Condal	Noreña	Alejandro Ortea
Gijón Industrial	Gijón	Santa Cruz
L'Entregu	El Entrego, San Martín del Rey Aurelio	Nuevo Nalón
Lenense	Pola de Lena, Lena	El Sotón
Llanera	Llanera	Pepe Quimarán
Llanes	Llanes	San José
Mosconia	Grado	Marqués de la Vega de Anzo
Navarro	Valliniello, Avilés	Tabiella
Praviano	Pravia	Santa Catalina
San Martín	Sotrondio, San Martín del Rey Aurelio	El Florán
Siero	Pola de Siero, Siero	El Bayu
Titánico	Laviana	Las Tolvas
Tuilla	Tuilla, Langreo	El Candín
Urraca	Posada, Llanes	La Corredoria
Valdesoto	Valdesoto, Siero	Villarrea
Vallobín	Oviedo	Vallobín

==== Subgroup A ====
Pos	Team	Pld	W	D	L	GF	GA	GD	Pts	Qualification
1	Ceares (C)	20	13	5	2	29	16	+13	44	Qualification for the promotion groups
2	Avilés	20	12	4	4	33	13	+20	40	Qualification for the promotion groups
3	Llanera	20	11	5	4	38	28	+10	38 (Note: Llanera finished ahead of Caudal on head-to-head points: Llanera-Caudal 2–0, Caudal-Llanera 0–1.)	Qualification for the promotion groups
4	Caudal	20	11	5	4	36	18	+18	38	Qualification for the promotion play-off groups
5	Gijón Industrial	20	7	6	7	34	27	+7	27	Qualification for the promotion play-off groups
6	Lenense	20	8	1	11	24	27	−3	25	Qualification for the promotion play-off groups
7	Praviano	20	7	3	10	23	28	−5	24	Qualification for the relegation groups
8	Navarro	20	6	4	10	18	26	−8	22	Qualification for the relegation groups
9	Mosconia	20	5	5	10	15	28	−13	20	Qualification for the relegation groups
10	Vallobín	20	5	2	13	14	32	−18	17	Qualification for the relegation groups
11	Avilés Stadium	20	2	6	12	12	33	−21	12	Qualification for the relegation groups

Source: Futbolme.com
Rules for classification: 1) points; 2) head-to-head points; 3) head-to-head goal difference; 4) goal difference; 5) number of goals scored
(C) Champions

==== Subgroup B ====
Pos	Team	Pld	W	D	L	GF	GA	GD	Pts	Qualification
1	L'Entregu (C)	18	13	1	4	32	13	+19	40	Qualification for the promotion groups
2	San Martín	18	9	6	3	31	21	+10	33	Qualification for the promotion groups
3	Llanes	18	9	5	4	29	16	+13	32	Qualification for the promotion groups
4	Tuilla	18	7	6	5	25	19	+6	27	Qualification for the promotion play-off groups
5	Real Titánico	18	6	5	7	19	25	−6	23	Qualification for the promotion play-off groups
6	Urraca	18	5	7	6	9	12	−3	22 (Note: Urraca finished ahead of Condal on goal difference.)	Qualification for the promotion play-off groups
7	Condal	18	5	7	6	13	19	−6	22	Qualification for the relegation groups
8	Colunga	18	5	5	8	11	17	−6	20	Qualification for the relegation groups
9	Siero	18	4	3	11	12	23	−11	15	Qualification for the relegation groups
10	Valdesoto	18	3	3	12	10	26	−16	12	Qualification for the relegation groups

Source: Futbolme.com
Rules for classification: 1) points; 2) head-to-head points; 3) head-to-head goal difference; 4) goal difference; 5) number of goals scored
(C) Champions

=== Group 3 – Cantabria ===
==== Teams and locations ====
Location of teams of the 2020–21 Tercera División Group III
Red: Subgroup A; Green: Subgroup B

Team	City	Home ground
Atlético Albericia	Santander	Juan Hormaechea
Barreda	Barreda, Torrelavega	Solvay
Barquereño	San Vicente de la Barquera	El Castañar
Bezana	Santa Cruz de Bezana	Municipal
Cartes	Cartes	El Ansar
Castro	Castro Urdiales	Mioño
Cayón	Sarón, Santa María de Cayón	Fernando Astobiza
Escobedo	Escobedo, Camargo	Eusebio Arce
Gimnástica Torrelavega	Torrelavega	El Malecón
Guarnizo	Guarnizo, El Astillero	El Pilar
Rayo Cantabria	Santander	La Albericia
Revilla	Revilla, Camargo	El Crucero
Ribamontán al Mar	Ribamontán al Mar	Baceñuela
Rinconeda Polanco	Polanco	Municipal
Sámano	Sámano, Castro Urdiales	Vallegón
Selaya	Selaya	El Castañal
Siete Villas	Castillo, Arnuero	San Pedro
Solares-Medio Cudeyo	Solares, Medio Cudeyo	La Estación
Textil Escudo	Cabezón de la Sal	Municipal
Torina	Bárcena de Pie de Concha	Municipal
Tropezón	Tanos, Torrelavega	Santa Ana
Vimenor	Vioño de Piélagos, Piélagos	La Vidriera

==== Subgroup A ====
Pos	Team	Pld	W	D	L	GF	GA	GD	Pts	Qualification
1	Tropezón (C)	20	12	7	1	40	19	+21	43	Qualification for the promotion groups
2	Gimnástica Torrelavega	20	10	7	3	42	20	+22	37 (Note: Gimnástica Torrelavega finished ahead of Escobedo on goal difference.)	Qualification for the promotion groups
3	Escobedo	20	11	4	5	27	17	+10	37	Qualification for the promotion groups
4	Vimenor	20	9	5	6	29	20	+9	32	Qualification for the promotion play-off groups
5	Cartes	20	8	5	7	23	22	+1	29 (Note: Cartes finished ahead of Selaya on head-to-head points: Cartes-Selaya 4–0, Selaya-Cartes 1–1.)	Qualification for the promotion play-off groups
6	Selaya	20	9	2	9	24	32	−8	29	Qualification for the promotion play-off groups
7	Castro	20	8	3	9	20	23	−3	27	Qualification for the relegation groups
8	Torina	20	5	5	10	21	31	−10	20	Qualification for the relegation groups
9	Guarnizo	20	4	7	9	18	30	−12	19 (Note: Guarnizo finished ahead of Barreda on goal difference.)	Qualification for the relegation groups
10	Barreda	20	5	4	11	18	33	−15	19	Qualification for the relegation groups
11	Solares-Medio Cudeyo	20	1	7	12	9	24	−15	10	Qualification for the relegation groups

Source: Futbolme.com
Rules for classification: 1) points; 2) head-to-head points; 3) head-to-head goal difference; 4) goal difference; 5) number of goals scored
(C) Champions

==== Subgroup B ====
Pos	Team	Pld	W	D	L	GF	GA	GD	Pts	Qualification
1	Cayón (C)	20	16	3	1	47	14	+33	51	Qualification for the promotion groups
2	Rayo Cantabria	20	14	4	2	45	16	+29	46	Qualification for the promotion groups
3	Siete Villas	20	13	3	4	30	15	+15	42	Qualification for the promotion groups
4	Sámano	20	11	4	5	33	20	+13	37	Qualification for the promotion play-off groups
5	Textil Escudo	20	9	6	5	27	17	+10	33	Qualification for the promotion play-off groups
6	Atlético Albericia	20	5	5	10	27	30	−3	20	Qualification for the promotion play-off groups
7	Rinconeda Polanco	20	5	4	11	19	37	−18	19	Qualification for the relegation groups
8	Revilla	20	4	5	11	21	36	−15	17	Qualification for the relegation groups
9	Bezana	20	4	4	12	14	40	−26	16	Qualification for the relegation groups
10	Barquereño	20	4	3	13	17	33	−16	15	Qualification for the relegation groups
11	Ribamontán	20	3	3	14	12	34	−22	12	Qualification for the relegation groups

Source: Futbolme.com
Rules for classification: 1) points; 2) head-to-head points; 3) head-to-head goal difference; 4) goal difference; 5) number of goals scored
(C) Champions

=== Group 4 – Basque Country ===
==== Teams and locations ====
Location of teams of the 2020–21 Tercera División Group IV
Red: Subgroup A; Green: Subgroup B

Team	City	Home ground
Anaitasuna	Azkoitia	Txerloia
Ariznabarra	Vitoria-Gasteiz	Ariznabarra
Aurrerá Ondarroa	Ondarroa	Zaldupe
Balmaseda	Balmaseda	La Baluga
Basconia	Basauri	López Cortázar
Beasain	Beasain	Loinaz
Cultural Durango	Durango	Tabira
Deusto	Bilbao	Etxezuri
Gernika	Gernika-Lumo	Urbieta
Lagun Onak	Azpeitia	Garmendipe
Pasaia	Pasaia	Don Bosco
Real Sociedad C	San Sebastián	Zubieta
San Ignacio	Vitoria-Gasteiz	Adurtzabal
Santurtzi	Santurtzi	San Jorge
Santutxu	Bilbao	Maiona
Sestao River	Sestao	Las Llanas
Sodupe	Güeñes	Lorenzo Hurtado de Saratxo
Somorrostro	Muskiz	El Malecón
Tolosa	Tolosa	Berazubi
Urduliz	Urduliz	Iparralde
Urgatzi	Vitoria-Gasteiz	Olabide
Vitoria	Laudio	Ellakuri

==== Subgroup A ====
Pos	Team	Pld	W	D	L	GF	GA	GD	Pts	Qualification
1	Gernika (C)	20	13	4	3	39	16	+23	43	Qualification for the promotion groups
2	Real Sociedad C	20	12	4	4	48	27	+21	40	Qualification for the promotion groups
3	Sestao River	20	12	3	5	40	13	+27	39	Qualification for the promotion groups
4	Deusto	20	11	3	6	30	24	+6	36	Qualification for the promotion play-off groups
5	Santutxu	20	8	5	7	20	23	−3	29	Qualification for the promotion play-off groups
6	Beasain	20	6	9	5	20	14	+6	27	Qualification for the promotion play-off groups
7	Tolosa	20	6	6	8	21	26	−5	24	Qualification for the relegation groups
8	Aurrerá Ondarroa	20	5	5	10	23	31	−8	20	Qualification for the relegation groups
9	Balmaseda	20	3	9	8	22	27	−5	18	Qualification for the relegation groups
10	Somorrostro	20	4	5	11	20	31	−11	17	Qualification for the relegation groups
11	Urgatzi	20	3	1	16	11	62	−51	10	Qualification for the relegation groups

Source: Futbolme.com
Rules for classification: 1) points; 2) head-to-head points; 3) head-to-head goal difference; 4) goal difference; 5) number of goals scored
(C) Champions

==== Subgroup B ====
Pos	Team	Pld	W	D	L	GF	GA	GD	Pts	Qualification
1	Vitoria (C)	20	9	8	3	20	4	+16	35 (Note: Vitoria finished ahead of Urduliz on head-to-head points: Vitoria-Urduliz 0–1, Urduliz-Vitoria 0–3.)	Qualification for the promotion groups
2	Urduliz	20	9	8	3	28	18	+10	35	Qualification for the promotion groups
3	Pasaia	20	9	7	4	22	14	+8	34	Qualification for the promotion groups
4	Basconia	20	7	9	4	24	15	+9	30 (Note: Basconia finished ahead of Anaitasuna on head-to-head points: Anaitasuna-Basconia 0–1, Basconia-Anaitasuna 2–0.)	Qualification for the promotion play-off groups
5	Anaitasuna	20	7	9	4	20	19	+1	30	Qualification for the promotion play-off groups
6	San Ignacio	20	7	8	5	19	19	0	29	Qualification for the promotion play-off groups
7	Santurtzi	20	6	5	9	18	27	−9	23	Qualification for the relegation groups
8	Cultural Durango	20	5	7	8	17	20	−3	22	Qualification for the relegation groups
9	Sodupe	20	4	8	8	21	23	−2	20	Qualification for the relegation groups
10	Ariznabarra	20	3	7	10	12	28	−16	16	Qualification for the relegation groups
11	Lagun Onak	20	3	6	11	17	31	−14	15	Qualification for the relegation groups

Source: Futbolme.com
Rules for classification: 1) points; 2) head-to-head points; 3) head-to-head goal difference; 4) goal difference; 5) number of goals scored
(C) Champions

=== Group 5 – Catalonia ===
==== Teams and locations ====
Location of teams of the 2020–21 Tercera División Group V
Red: Subgroup A; Green: Subgroup B
Location of teams of the 2020–21 Tercera División Group V in the province of Barcelona
Red: Subgroup A; Green: Subgroup B

Team	City	Home ground
Banyoles	Banyoles	Nou Municipal
Castelldefels	Castelldefels	El Canyar
Cerdanyola del Vallès	Cerdanyola del Vallès	La Bòbila-Pinetons
Europa	Barcelona	Nou Sardenya
Figueres	Figueres	Vilatenim
Girona B	Girona	Torres de Palau
Grama	Santa Coloma de Gramenet	Nou Municipal
Granollers	Granollers	Carrer Girona
Horta	Barcelona	Feliu i Codina
Igualada	Igualada	Les Comes
Manresa	Manresa	El Congost
Montañesa	Barcelona	Nou Barris
Peralada	Peralada	Municipal
Pobla de Mafumet	La Pobla de Mafumet	Municipal
San Cristóbal	Terrassa	Ca n'Anglada
Sant Andreu	Barcelona	Narcís Sala
Santfeliuenc	Sant Feliu de Llobregat	Les Grases
Sants	Barcelona	La Magòria
Terrassa	Terrassa	Olímpic
Valls	Valls	Camp del Vilar
Vilafranca	Vilafranca del Penedès	Municipal
Vilassar de Mar	Vilassar de Mar	Xevi Ramón

==== Subgroup A ====
Pos	Team	Pld	W	D	L	GF	GA	GD	Pts	Qualification
1	Europa (C)	20	13	5	2	35	17	+18	44	Qualification for the promotion groups
2	Vilafranca	20	11	7	2	33	16	+17	40	Ineligible for promotion
3	Terrassa	20	10	5	5	23	11	+12	35	Qualification for the promotion groups
4	San Cristóbal	20	8	7	5	17	13	+4	31	Qualification for the promotion play-off groups
5	Manresa	20	7	8	5	21	16	+5	29	Qualification for the promotion play-off groups
6	Castelldefels	20	7	7	6	19	20	−1	28	Qualification for the promotion play-off groups
7	Pobla Mafumet	20	6	8	6	27	25	+2	26	Qualification for the relegation groups
8	Santfeliuenc	20	6	4	10	16	24	−8	22	Qualification for the relegation groups
9	Valls	20	4	5	11	12	24	−12	17	Qualification for the relegation groups
10	Igualada	20	3	4	13	14	32	−18	13	Qualification for the relegation groups
11	Montañesa	20	2	6	12	10	29	−19	12	Qualification for the relegation groups

Source: Futbolme.com
Rules for classification: 1) points; 2) head-to-head points; 3) head-to-head goal difference; 4) goal difference; 5) number of goals scored
(C) Champions

==== Subgroup B ====
Pos	Team	Pld	W	D	L	GF	GA	GD	Pts	Qualification
1	Cerdanyola del Vallès (C)	20	11	7	2	31	15	+16	40	Qualification for the promotion groups
2	Girona B	20	10	7	3	29	12	+17	37	Qualification for the promotion groups
3	Granollers	20	9	6	5	32	22	+10	33	Qualification for the promotion groups
4	Sant Andreu	20	9	4	7	24	21	+3	31	Qualification for the promotion play-off groups
5	Vilassar de Mar	20	8	6	6	21	21	0	30	Qualification for the promotion play-off groups
6	Grama	20	8	3	9	22	28	−6	27	Qualification for the promotion play-off groups
7	Peralada	20	6	7	7	16	18	−2	25	Qualification for the relegation groups
8	Sants	20	7	3	10	17	25	−8	24	Qualification for the relegation groups
9	Figueres	20	5	6	9	19	32	−13	21	Qualification for the relegation groups
10	Horta	20	4	6	10	20	26	−6	18	Qualification for the relegation groups
11	Banyoles	20	4	3	13	13	24	−11	15	Qualification for the relegation groups

Source: Futbolme.com
Rules for classification: 1) points; 2) head-to-head points; 3) head-to-head goal difference; 4) goal difference; 5) number of goals scored
(C) Champions

=== Group 6 – Valencian Community ===
==== Teams and locations ====
Location of teams of the 2020–21 Tercera División Group VI
Red: Subgroup A; Green: Subgroup B

Team	City	Home ground
Acero	Sagunto	El Fornàs
Alzira	Alzira	Luis Suñer Picó
Atlético Saguntino	Sagunto	Morvedre
Benicarló	Benicarló	Pichi Alonso
Benigànim	Benigànim	Municipal
Crevillente	Crevillent	Enrique Miralles
Elche Ilicitano	Elche	José Díaz Iborra
Eldense	Elda	Nuevo Pepico Amat
Hércules B	Alicante	Juan Antonio Samaranch
Intercity	Sant Joan d'Alacant	San Juan
Jove Español	San Vicente del Raspeig	Ciudad Deportiva
Novelda	Novelda	La Magdalena
Olímpic	Xàtiva	La Murta
Paterna	Paterna	Gerardo Salvador
Recambios Colón	Catarroja	Sedaví
Roda	Villarreal	Pamesa Cerámica
Silla	Silla	Vicente Morera
Torrent	Torrent	San Gregorio
Vilamarxant	Vilamarxant	Hermanos Albiol
Villajoyosa	Villajoyosa	Nou Pla
Villarreal C	Villarreal	Pamesa Cerámica

==== Subgroup A ====
Pos	Team	Pld	W	D	L	GF	GA	GD	Pts	Qualification
1	Alzira (C)	20	10	8	2	29	12	+17	38	Qualification for the promotion groups
2	Roda	20	9	8	3	28	16	+12	35	Qualification for the promotion groups
3	Atlético Saguntino	20	7	10	3	30	27	+3	31	Qualification for the promotion groups
4	Villarreal C	20	6	12	2	32	18	+14	30	Qualification for the promotion play-off groups
5	Silla	20	5	10	5	20	21	−1	25	Qualification for the promotion play-off groups
6	Recambios Colón	20	5	8	7	16	19	−3	23	Qualification for the promotion play-off groups
7	Benicarló	20	4	10	6	22	21	+1	22	Qualification for the relegation groups
8	Torrent	20	4	9	7	17	25	−8	21	Qualification for the relegation groups
9	Acero	20	4	8	8	18	25	−7	20 (Note: Acero finished ahead of Paterna on goal difference.)	Qualification for the relegation groups
10	Paterna	20	3	11	6	14	25	−11	20	Qualification for the relegation groups
11	Vilamarxant	20	3	6	11	13	30	−17	15	Qualification for the relegation groups

Source: Futbolme.com
Rules for classification: 1) points; 2) head-to-head points; 3) head-to-head goal difference; 4) goal difference; 5) number of goals scored
(C) Champions

==== Subgroup B ====
Pos	Team	Pld	W	D	L	GF	GA	GD	Pts	Qualification
1	Eldense (C)	18	12	5	1	30	10	+20	41	Qualification for the promotion groups
2	Elche Ilicitano	18	11	5	2	32	17	+15	38	Qualification for the promotion groups
3	Intercity	18	10	7	1	30	8	+22	37	Qualification for the promotion groups
4	Olímpic	18	7	4	7	22	24	−2	25	Qualification for the promotion play-off groups
5	Benigànim	18	5	5	8	14	30	−16	20	Qualification for the promotion play-off groups
6	Jove Español	18	5	4	9	17	23	−6	19 (Note: Jove Español finished ahead of Crevillente on head-to-head points: Crevillente-Jove Español 3–4, Jove Español-Crevillente 0–0.)	Qualification for the promotion play-off groups
7	Crevillente	18	5	4	9	17	24	−7	19	Qualification for the relegation groups
8	Hércules B	18	4	6	8	13	17	−4	18	Qualification for the relegation groups
9	Villajoyosa	18	4	5	9	17	27	−10	17	Qualification for the relegation groups
10	Novelda	18	3	3	12	15	27	−12	12	Qualification for the relegation groups

Source: Futbolme.com
Rules for classification: 1) points; 2) head-to-head points; 3) head-to-head goal difference; 4) goal difference; 5) number of goals scored
(C) Champions

=== Group 7 – Community of Madrid ===
==== Teams and locations ====
Location of teams of the 2020–21 Tercera División Group VII
Red: Subgroup A; Green: Subgroup B
Location of the Madrid municipality teams of the 2020–21 Tercera División Group VII
Red: Subgroup A; Green: Subgroup B

Team	City	Home ground
Alcalá	Alcalá de Henares	Municipal del Val
Alcorcón B	Alcorcón	Anexo de Santo Domingo
Aranjuez	Aranjuez	El Deleite
Atlético Pinto	Pinto	Amelia del Castillo
Carabanchel	Madrid	La Mina
Complutense	Alcalá de Henares	Recinto Ferial
El Álamo	El Álamo	Facundo Rivas
Flat Earth	Madrid	Castroserna
Leganés B	Leganés	Anexo de Butarque
Moratalaz	Madrid	La Dehesa
Móstoles	Móstoles	El Soto
Móstoles URJC	Móstoles	El Soto
Paracuellos Antamira	Paracuellos de Jarama	Polideportivo
Parla	Parla	Los Prados
Pozuelo de Alarcón	Pozuelo de Alarcón	Valle de las Cañas
Rayo Vallecano B	Madrid	Ciudad Deportiva
San Fernando de Henares	San Fernando de Henares	Santiago del Pino
Santa Ana	Madrid	Santa Ana
Torrejón	Torrejón de Ardoz	Las Veredillas
Trival Valderas	Alcorcón	La Canaleja
Unión Adarve	Madrid	Garcia de La Mata
Villanueva del Pardillo	Villanueva del Pardillo	Los Pinos
Villaverde San Andrés	Madrid	Boetticher

==== Subgroup A ====
Pos	Team	Pld	W	D	L	GF	GA	GD	Pts	Qualification
1	Unión Adarve (C)	22	13	5	4	41	17	+24	44	Qualification for the promotion groups
2	Moratalaz	22	12	6	4	39	20	+19	42	Qualification for the promotion groups
3	Rayo Vallecano B	22	10	8	4	35	27	+8	38 (Note: Rayo Vallecano B finished ahead of Pozuelo de Alarcón on head-to-head goals: Rayo Vallecano B-Pozuelo de Alarcón 1–3, Pozuelo de Alarcón-Rayo Vallecano B 1–5.)	Qualification for the promotion groups
4	Pozuelo de Alarcón	22	11	5	6	33	20	+13	38	Qualification for the promotion play-off groups
5	Flat Earth	22	10	6	6	22	17	+5	36	Qualification for the promotion play-off groups
6	Torrejón	22	7	11	4	32	17	+15	32	Qualification for the promotion play-off groups
7	Complutense	22	8	6	8	22	22	0	30	Qualification for the relegation groups
8	Alcalá	22	6	10	6	20	16	+4	28	Qualification for the relegation groups
9	Paracuellos Antamira (Note: Moratalaz was awarded an 0–3 win in their Round 15 match against Paracuellos Antamira after the latter fielded an ineligible player. The match originally ended 2–0. Unión Adarve was awarded an 0–3 win in their Round 12 match against Paracuellos Antamira after the latter also fielded another ineligible player. The match originally ended 2–2.)	22	6	8	8	18	27	−9	26	Qualification for the relegation groups
10	San Fernando de Henares (Note: Moratalaz was awarded an 0–3 win in their Round 16 match against San Fernando de Henares after the latter fielded an ineligible player. The match originally ended 0–0.)	22	4	5	13	18	39	−21	17	Qualification for the relegation groups
11	Villanueva del Pardillo (Note: Flat Earth was awarded an 0–3 win in their Round 12 match against Villanueva del Pardillo after the latter fielded an ineligible player. The match originally ended 1–0.)	22	4	4	14	13	31	−18	16	Qualification for the relegation groups
12	Santa Ana	22	2	4	16	11	51	−40	10	Qualification for the relegation groups

Source: Futbolme.com
Rules for classification: 1) points; 2) head-to-head points; 3) head-to-head goal difference; 4) goal difference; 5) number of goals scored
(C) Champions

==== Subgroup B ====
Pos	Team	Pld	W	D	L	GF	GA	GD	Pts	Qualification
1	Leganés B (C)	20	15	5	0	34	12	+22	50	Qualification for the promotion groups
2	Móstoles URJC	20	14	5	1	31	9	+22	47	Qualification for the promotion groups
3	Alcorcón B	20	9	7	4	32	15	+17	34	Qualification for the promotion groups
4	Parla	20	7	7	6	20	20	0	28	Qualification for the promotion play-off groups
5	Trival Valderas	20	6	7	7	17	20	−3	25	Qualification for the promotion play-off groups
6	Carabanchel	20	5	9	6	18	20	−2	24 (Note: Carabanchel finished ahead of Atlético Pinto on goal difference.)	Qualification for the promotion play-off groups
7	Atlético Pinto	20	7	3	10	20	30	−10	24	Qualification for the relegation groups
8	Villaverde San Andrés	20	6	3	11	19	29	−10	21	Qualification for the relegation groups
9	El Álamo	20	3	7	10	24	33	−9	16	Qualification for the relegation groups
10	Aranjuez	20	3	6	11	19	32	−13	15	Qualification for the relegation groups
11	Móstoles (Note: Villaverde San Andrés was awarded a 0–3 win over Móstoles after the latter failed to adhere to COVID-19 protocols in their Round 5 match. The match was originally suspended at half-time with Móstoles leading 1–0.)	20	3	5	12	14	28	−14	14	Qualification for the relegation groups

Source: Futbolme.com
Rules for classification: 1) points; 2) head-to-head points; 3) head-to-head goal difference; 4) goal difference; 5) number of goals scored
(C) Champions

=== Group 8 – Castile and León ===
==== Teams and locations ====
Location of teams of the 2020–21 Tercera División Group VIII
Red: Subgroup A; Green: Subgroup B

Team	City	Home ground
Almazán	Almazán	La Arboleda
Arandina	Aranda de Duero	El Montecillo
Atlético Astorga	Astorga	La Eragudina
Atlético Bembibre	Bembibre	La Devesa
Atlético Tordesillas	Tordesillas	Las Salinas
Ávila	Ávila	Adolfo Suárez
Becerril	Becerril de Campos	Mariano Haro
Bupolsa	Burgos	San Amaro
Burgos Promesas	Burgos	Castañares
Cebrereña	Cebreros	El Mancho
Cristo Atlético	Palencia	Nueva Balastera
Colegios Diocesanos	Ávila	Sancti Spiritu
Gimnástica Segoviana	Segovia	La Albuera
Júpiter Leonés	León	Puente Castro
La Bañeza	La Bañeza	La Llanera
La Granja	San Ildefonso	El Hospital
La Virgen del Camino	La Virgen del Camino	Los Dominicos
Mirandés B	Miranda de Ebro	Ence
Numancia B	Soria	Francisco Rubio
Peñaranda de Bracamonte	Peñaranda de Bracamonte	Luis García
Real Burgos	Burgos	San Amaro
Salamanca UDS B	Salamanca	Pistas del Helmántico
Santa Marta	Santa Marta de Tormes	Alfonso San Casto

==== Subgroup A ====
Pos	Team	Pld	W	D	L	GF	GA	GD	Pts	Qualification
1	Cristo Atlético (C)	20	14	2	4	29	11	+18	44	Qualification for the promotion groups
2	Atlético Astorga	20	10	5	5	26	11	+15	35 (Note: Atlético Astorga finished ahead of Júpiter Leonés on head-to-head points: Júpiter Leonés-Atlético Astorga 1–1, Atlético Astorga-Júpiter Leonés 1–0.)	Qualification for the promotion groups
3	Júpiter Leonés	20	9	8	3	25	18	+7	35	Qualification for the promotion groups
4	La Virgen del Camino	20	8	7	5	22	18	+4	31	Qualification for the promotion play-off groups
5	Atlético Tordesillas	20	7	5	8	21	22	−1	26 (Note: Atlético Tordesillas finished ahead of Atlético Bembibre on goal difference.)	Qualification for the promotion play-off groups
6	Atlético Bembibre	20	6	8	6	17	20	−3	26	Qualification for the promotion play-off groups
7	La Bañeza	20	6	7	7	23	23	0	25	Qualification for the relegation groups
8	Salamanca B	20	4	10	6	17	26	−9	22	Qualification for the relegation groups
9	Santa Marta	20	5	6	9	14	17	−3	21	Qualification for the relegation groups
10	Peñaranda	20	4	4	12	13	28	−15	16	Qualification for the relegation groups
11	Becerril	20	3	6	11	10	23	−13	15	Qualification for the relegation groups

Source: Futbolme.com
Rules for classification: 1) points; 2) head-to-head points; 3) head-to-head goal difference; 4) goal difference; 5) number of goals scored
(C) Champions

==== Subgroup B ====
Pos	Team	Pld	W	D	L	GF	GA	GD	Pts	Qualification
1	Gimnástica Segoviana (C)	22	18	3	1	54	10	+44	57	Qualification for the promotion groups
2	Burgos Promesas	22	11	7	4	33	15	+18	40	Qualification for the promotion groups
3	Numancia B	22	12	3	7	40	34	+6	39	Ineligible for promotion
4	Arandina	22	10	6	6	41	31	+10	36	Qualification for the promotion play-off groups
5	Mirandés B	22	8	9	5	30	21	+9	33	Qualification for the promotion play-off groups
6	Ávila	22	9	4	9	25	23	+2	31 (Note: Ávila finished ahead of Almazán on head-to-head points: Ávila-Almazán 3–1, Almazán–Ávila 2–1.)	Qualification for the promotion play-off groups
7	Almazán	22	9	4	9	26	31	−5	31	Qualification for the relegation groups
8	Colegios Diocesanos	22	7	2	13	19	42	−23	23	Qualification for the relegation groups
9	La Granja	22	6	4	12	24	30	−6	22	Qualification for the relegation groups
10	Real Burgos	22	4	7	11	18	37	−19	19 (Note: Real Burgos finished ahead of Cebrereña on head-to-head points: Real Burgos-Cebrereña 3–0, Cebrereña-Real Burgos 0–0.)	Qualification for the relegation groups
11	Cebrereña	22	5	4	13	18	36	−18	19	Qualification for the relegation groups
12	Bupolsa	22	4	5	13	17	35	−18	17	Qualification for the relegation groups

Source: Futbolme.com
Rules for classification: 1) points; 2) head-to-head points; 3) head-to-head goal difference; 4) goal difference; 5) number of goals scored
(C) Champions

=== Group 9 – Eastern Andalusia and Melilla ===
==== Teams and locations ====
Location of teams of the 2020–21 Tercera División Group IX – Andalusia
Red: Subgroup A; Green: Subgroup B
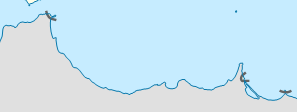
Location of teams of the 2020–21 Tercera División Group IX – Melilla
Red: Subgroup A; Green: Subgroup B

Team	City	Home ground
Alhaurín de la Torre	Alhaurín de la Torre	Los Manantiales
Alhaurino	Alhaurín El Grande	Miguel Fijones
Almería B	Almería	Estadio de los Juegos Mediterráneos
Antequera	Antequera	El Maulí
Atlético Malagueño	Málaga	El Viso
Atlético Mancha Real	Mancha Real	La Juventud
Atlético Porcuna	Porcuna	San Benito
Ciudad de Torredonjimeno	Torredonjimeno	Matías Prats
El Palo	Málaga	San Ignacio
Estepona	Estepona	Francisco Muñoz Pérez
Huétor Tájar	Huétor-Tájar	Miguel Moranto
Huétor Vega	Huétor Vega	Las Viñas
Jaén	Jaén	La Victoria
Juventud Torremolinos	Torremolinos	El Pozuelo
Loja	Loja	Medina Lauxa
Maracena	Maracena	Ciudad Deportiva
Melilla	Melilla	La Espiguera
Motril	Motril	Escribano Castilla
Polideportivo Almería	Almería	Juventud Emilio Campra
Torreperogil	Torreperogil	Abdón Martínez Fariñas
Vélez	Vélez-Málaga	Vivar Téllez

==== Subgroup A ====
Pos	Team	Pld	W	D	L	GF	GA	GD	Pts	Qualification
1	Atlético Mancha Real (C)	20	10	6	4	35	12	+23	36	Qualification for the promotion groups
2	Almería B	20	9	6	5	32	25	+7	33 (Note: Almería B finished ahead of Ciudad de Torredonjimeno on head-to-head points: Torredonjimeno-Almería B 3–3, Almería B-Torredonjimeno 1–0.)	Qualification for the promotion groups
3	Ciudad de Torredonjimeno	20	9	6	5	35	25	+10	33	Qualification for the promotion groups
4	Torreperogil	20	7	7	6	16	17	−1	28 (Note: Torreperogil finished ahead of Huétor Tájar on head-to-head points: Torreperogil-Huétor Tájar 1–1, Huétor Tájar-Torreperogil 1–2.)	Qualification for the promotion play-off groups
5	Huétor Tájar	20	6	10	4	28	25	+3	28	Qualification for the promotion play-off groups
6	Huétor Vega	20	6	7	7	25	27	−2	25 (Note: Huétor Vega finished ahead of Jaén on head-to-head points: Jaén-Huétor Vega 0–2, Huétor Vega-Jaén 0–1.)	Qualification for the promotion play-off groups
7	Jaén	20	7	4	9	24	27	−3	25	Qualification for the relegation groups
8	Polideportivo Almería	20	6	5	9	15	25	−10	23	Qualification for the relegation groups
9	Loja	20	6	3	11	15	32	−17	21 (Note: Loja finished ahead of Atlético Porcuna on head-to-head points: Atlético Porcuna-Loja 0–0, Loja-Atlético Porcuna 3–2.)	Qualification for the relegation groups
10	Atlético Porcuna	20	3	12	5	22	23	−1	21	Qualification for the relegation groups
11	Maracena	20	4	8	8	19	28	−9	20	Qualification for the relegation groups

Source: Futbolme.com
Rules for classification: 1) points; 2) head-to-head points; 3) head-to-head goal difference; 4) goal difference; 5) number of goals scored
(C) Champions

==== Subgroup B ====
Pos	Team	Pld	W	D	L	GF	GA	GD	Pts	Qualification
1	Vélez (C)	18	11	4	3	22	15	+7	37	Qualification for the promotion groups
2	Antequera	18	8	6	4	29	11	+18	30	Qualification for the promotion groups
3	El Palo	18	7	7	4	18	17	+1	28 (Note: El Palo finished ahead of Juventud Torremolinos and Atlético Malagueño on head-to-head points: El Palo: 6 pts, Juventud Torremolinos: 5 pts, Atlético Malagueño: 4 pts.)	Qualification for the promotion groups
4	Juventud Torremolinos	18	7	7	4	23	18	+5	28	Qualification for the promotion play-off groups
5	Atlético Malagueño (Note: Melilla CD was awarded an 3–0 win in their Round 17 match against Atlético Malagueño after the latter fielded an ineligible player. The match originally ended 0–2.)	18	8	4	6	28	19	+9	28	Qualification for the promotion play-off groups
6	Alhaurín de la Torre	18	5	5	8	17	27	−10	20 (Note: Alhaurín de la Torre finished ahead of Estepona and Motril on head-to-head points: Alhaurín de la Torre: 7 pts, Estepona: 7 pts, Motril: 3 pts. Alhaurín de la Torre finished ahead of Estepona on head-to-head points: Alhaurín de la Torre-Estepona 1–0, Estepona-Alhaurín de la Torre 2–2)	Qualification for the promotion play-off groups
7	Estepona	18	5	5	8	18	25	−7	20	Qualification for the relegation groups
8	Motril	18	6	2	10	21	26	−5	20	Qualification for the relegation groups
9	Melilla CD	18	4	5	9	17	29	−12	17 (Note: Melilla CD finished ahead of Alhaurino on head-to-head points: Alhaurino-Melilla CD 1–1, Melilla CD-Alhaurino 1–0.)	Qualification for the relegation groups
10	Alhaurino	18	4	5	9	22	28	−6	17	Qualification for the relegation groups

Source: Futbolme.com
Rules for classification: 1) points; 2) head-to-head points; 3) head-to-head goal difference; 4) goal difference; 5) number of goals scored
(C) Champions

=== Group 10 – Western Andalusia and Ceuta ===
==== Teams and locations ====
Location of teams of the 2020–21 Tercera División Group X
Red: Subgroup A; Green: Subgroup B

Team	City	Home ground
Arcos	Arcos de la Frontera	Antonio Barbadillo
Atlético Antoniano	Lebrija	Municipal
Cabecense	Las Cabezas de San Juan	Carlos Marchena
Castilleja	Castilleja de la Cuesta	Municipal
Ceuta	Ceuta	Alfonso Murube
Ciudad de Lucena	Lucena	Ciudad de Lucena
Conil	Conil de la Frontera	José Antonio Pérez Ureba
Córdoba B	Córdoba	Rafael Gómez
Coria	Coria del Río	Guadalquivir
Gerena	Gerena	José Juan Romero Gil
La Palma	La Palma del Condado	Polideportivo Municipal
Lebrijana	Lebrija	Municipal
Los Barrios	Los Barrios	San Rafael
Pozoblanco	Pozoblanco	Municipal
Rota	Rota	Alcalde Navarro Flores
Puente Genil	Puente Genil	Manuel Polinario
San Roque de Lepe	Lepe	Ciudad de Lepe
Sevilla C	Seville	José Ramón Cisneros Palacios
Utrera	Utrera	San Juan Bosco
Xerez	Jerez de la Frontera	La Juventud
Xerez Deportivo	Jerez de la Frontera	Chapín

==== Subgroup A ====
Pos	Team	Pld	W	D	L	GF	GA	GD	Pts	Qualification
1	Xerez Deportivo (C)	18	11	4	3	26	11	+15	37	Qualification for the promotion groups
2	Xerez	18	10	5	3	23	11	+12	35	Qualification for the promotion groups
3	Ceuta	18	7	8	3	26	17	+9	29	Qualification for the promotion groups
4	Los Barrios	18	7	3	8	18	17	+1	24	Qualification for the promotion play-off groups
5	Rota	18	6	4	8	15	21	−6	22	Qualification for the promotion play-off groups
6	Atlético Antoniano	18	4	9	5	15	20	−5	21	Qualification for the promotion play-off groups
7	Conil	18	3	11	4	19	18	+1	20	Qualification for the relegation groups
8	Cabecense	18	4	7	7	15	23	−8	19	Qualification for the relegation groups
9	Arcos	18	4	5	9	10	19	−9	17	Qualification for the relegation groups
10	Lebrijana	18	4	4	10	15	25	−10	16	Qualification for the relegation groups

Source: Futbolme.com
Rules for classification: 1) points; 2) head-to-head points; 3) head-to-head goal difference; 4) goal difference; 5) number of goals scored
(C) Champions

==== Subgroup B ====
Pos	Team	Pld	W	D	L	GF	GA	GD	Pts	Qualification
1	San Roque de Lepe (C)	20	14	3	3	30	18	+12	45	Qualification for the promotion groups
2	Ciudad de Lucena	20	12	4	4	35	16	+19	40	Qualification for the promotion groups
3	Puente Genil	20	9	6	5	28	24	+4	33	Qualification for the promotion groups
4	Córdoba B	20	8	6	6	31	25	+6	30 (Note: Córdoba B finished ahead of Utrera on head-to-head points: Utrera-Córdoba B 1–1, Córdoba B-Utrera 3–0.)	Ineligible for promotion
5	Utrera	20	9	3	8	26	26	0	30	Qualification for the promotion play-off groups
6	Pozoblanco	20	7	6	7	22	23	−1	27	Qualification for the promotion play-off groups
7	Sevilla C	20	7	5	8	17	20	−3	26	Qualification for the relegation groups
8	Gerena	20	5	7	8	17	25	−8	22	Qualification for the relegation groups
9	Castilleja	20	6	3	11	25	27	−2	21	Qualification for the relegation groups
10	Coria	20	3	6	11	14	28	−14	15	Qualification for the relegation groups
11	La Palma	20	2	7	11	14	27	−13	13	Qualification for the relegation groups

Source: Futbolme.com
Rules for classification: 1) points; 2) head-to-head points; 3) head-to-head goal difference; 4) goal difference; 5) number of goals scored
(C) Champions

=== Group 11 – Balearic Islands ===
==== Teams and locations ====
Location of teams of the 2020–21 Tercera División Group XI
Red: Subgroup A; Green: Subgroup B

Team	City	Home ground
Alcúdia	Alcúdia	Els Arcs
Andratx	Andratx	Sa Plana
Binissalem	Binissalem	Miquel Pons
Cardassar	Sant Llorenç des Cardassar	Es Moleter
Collerense	Es Coll d'en Rabassa, Palma	Ca Na Paulina
Constància	Inca	Municipal
Esporles	Esporles	Municipal Son Quint
Felanitx	Felanitx	Es Torrentó
Ferriolense	Son Ferriol, Palma	Municipal
Formentera	Sant Francesc Xavier, Formentera	Municipal
Génova	Palma	Es Nou Garroveral
Ibiza Islas Pitiusas	Ibiza	Can Misses
Llosetense	Lloseta	Municipal
Mallorca B	Palma	Son Bibiloni
Manacor	Manacor	Na Capellera
Platges de Calvià	Magaluf, Calvià	Municipal de Magaluf
Portmany	Sant Antoni de Portmany	Sant Antoni
Sant Jordi	Sant Jordi de ses Salines, Sant Josep de sa Talaia	Kiko Serra
Sant Rafel	Sant Rafel de sa Creu, Sant Antoni de Portmany	Municipal
Santa Catalina Atlético	Palma	Son Flor
Santanyí	Santanyí	Municipal
Sóller	Sóller	En Maiol

==== Subgroup A ====
Pos	Team	Pld	W	D	L	GF	GA	GD	Pts	Qualification
1	Ibiza Islas Pitiusas (C)	20	13	5	2	38	11	+27	44 (Note: Ibiza Islas Pitiusas finished ahead of Andratx on head-to-head points: Andratx-Ibiza Islas Pitiusas 1–0, Ibiza Islas Pitiusas-Andratx 3–0.)	Qualification for the promotion groups
2	Andratx	20	14	2	4	35	17	+18	44	Qualification for the promotion groups
3	Constància	20	10	5	5	24	14	+10	35	Qualification for the promotion groups
4	Manacor	20	9	7	4	26	20	+6	34	Qualification for the promotion play-off groups
5	Portmany	20	9	3	8	29	26	+3	30	Qualification for the promotion play-off groups
6	Collerense	20	8	5	7	28	26	+2	29	Qualification for the promotion play-off groups
7	Sóller	20	6	5	9	21	36	−15	23	Qualification for the relegation groups
8	Cardassar	20	5	7	8	20	28	−8	22	Qualification for the relegation groups
9	Felanitx	20	5	4	11	29	32	−3	19	Qualification for the relegation groups
10	Ferriolense	20	3	4	13	14	32	−18	13	Qualification for the relegation groups
11	Génova	20	2	5	13	19	41	−22	11	Qualification for the relegation groups

Source: Futbolme.com
Rules for classification: 1) points; 2) head-to-head points; 3) head-to-head goal difference; 4) goal difference; 5) number of goals scored
(C) Champions

==== Subgroup B ====
Pos	Team	Pld	W	D	L	GF	GA	GD	Pts	Qualification
1	Platges de Calvià (C)	20	13	6	1	31	13	+18	45	Qualification for the promotion groups
2	Sant Jordi	20	12	5	3	33	17	+16	41	Qualification for the promotion groups
3	Formentera	20	12	3	5	36	20	+16	39	Qualification for the promotion groups
4	Mallorca B	20	11	5	4	34	10	+24	38	Qualification for the promotion play-off groups
5	Santanyí	20	11	2	7	23	12	+11	35	Qualification for the promotion play-off groups
6	Sant Rafel	20	5	7	8	25	24	+1	22 (Note: Sant Rafel finished ahead of Llosetense on goal difference.)	Qualification for the promotion play-off groups
7	Llosetense	20	6	4	10	17	28	−11	22	Qualification for the relegation groups
8	Alcúdia	20	5	6	9	17	32	−15	21	Qualification for the relegation groups
9	Santa Catalina Atlético	20	4	5	11	12	30	−18	17	Qualification for the relegation groups
10	Binissalem	20	2	9	9	17	24	−7	15	Qualification for the relegation groups
11	Esporles	20	1	4	15	15	50	−35	7	Qualification for the relegation groups

Source: Futbolme.com
Rules for classification: 1) points; 2) head-to-head points; 3) head-to-head goal difference; 4) goal difference; 5) number of goals scored
(C) Champions

=== Group 12 – Canary Islands ===
==== Teams and locations ====
Location of teams of the 2020–21 Tercera División Group XII
Red: Subgroup A; Green: Subgroup B

Team	City	Home ground
Arucas	Arucas	Tonono
Atlético Paso	El Paso	Municipal
Atlético Tacoronte	Tacoronte	Barranco las Lajas
Atlético Victoria	La Victoria de Acentejo	Municipal
Buzanada	Buzanada, Arona	Clementina de Bello
Gran Tarajal	Tuineje	Municipal
Guía	Santa María de Guía de Gran Canaria	Octavio Estévez
Güímar	Güímar	Tasagaya
Ibarra	Las Galletas, Arona	Villa Isabel
La Cuadra	Puerto del Rosario	Municipal de Los Pozos
Lanzarote	Arrecife	Ciudad Deportiva
Las Palmas C	Las Palmas	Anexo Gran Canaria
Mensajero	Santa Cruz de La Palma	Silvestre Carrillo
Panadería Pulido	Vega de San Mateo	San Mateo
San Fernando	San Bartolomé de Tirajana	Ciudad Deportiva
Santa Úrsula	Santa Úrsula	Argelio Tabares
Tenerife B	Santa Cruz de Tenerife	Centro Insular
Tenisca	Santa Cruz de La Palma	Virgen de las Nieves
Unión Viera	Las Palmas	Alfonso Silva
Vera	Puerto de la Cruz	Salvador Ledesma
Villa de Santa Brígida	Santa Brígida	El Guiniguada

==== Subgroup A ====
Pos	Team	Pld	W	D	L	GF	GA	GD	Pts	Qualification
1	San Fernando (C)	18	10	3	5	27	17	+10	33	Qualification for the promotion groups
2	Panadería Pulido (Note: Arucas was awarded a 3–0 win over Panadería Pulido in Round 1 after the latter fielded an ineligible player. The match originally ended 0–1.)	18	9	5	4	22	14	+8	32	Qualification for the promotion groups
3	Las Palmas C	18	9	3	6	26	22	+4	30	Ineligible for promotion
4	Gran Tarajal	18	7	8	3	18	12	+6	29	Qualification for the promotion play-off groups
5	Unión Viera	18	8	2	8	26	30	−4	26	Qualification for the promotion play-off groups
6	Lanzarote	18	7	3	8	18	17	+1	24 (Note: Lanzarote ahead of La Cuadra on head-to-head points: Lanzarote-La Cuadra 4–1, La Cuadra-Lanzarote 2–1.)	Qualification for the promotion play-off groups
7	La Cuadra	18	7	3	8	25	30	−5	24	Qualification for the relegation groups
8	Guía	18	5	4	9	18	28	−10	19	Qualification for the relegation groups
9	Villa de Santa Brígida	18	5	3	10	18	21	−3	18	Qualification for the relegation groups
10	Arucas	18	4	4	10	20	27	−7	16	Qualification for the relegation groups

Source: Futbolme.com
Rules for classification: 1) points; 2) head-to-head points; 3) head-to-head goal difference; 4) goal difference; 5) number of goals scored
(C) Champions

==== Subgroup B ====
Pos	Team	Pld	W	D	L	GF	GA	GD	Pts	Qualification
1	Mensajero (C)	20	12	4	4	28	17	+11	40	Qualification for the promotion groups
2	Tenisca	20	10	5	5	37	20	+17	35	Qualification for the promotion groups
3	Atlético Paso	20	8	9	3	28	15	+13	33	Qualification for the promotion groups
4	Buzanada	20	9	5	6	29	21	+8	32	Qualification for the promotion play-off groups
5	Tenerife B	20	9	4	7	33	26	+7	31	Qualification for the promotion play-off groups
6	Santa Úrsula	20	7	8	5	22	19	+3	29 (Note: Santa Úrsula finished ahead of Vera on goal difference.)	Qualification for the promotion play-off groups
7	Vera	20	8	5	7	24	24	0	29	Qualification for the relegation groups
8	Atlético Tacoronte	20	7	4	9	21	28	−7	25	Qualification for the relegation groups
9	Atlético Victoria	20	5	6	9	16	30	−14	21	Qualification for the relegation groups
10	Güímar	20	2	8	10	19	34	−15	14	Qualification for the relegation groups
11	Ibarra	20	2	4	14	10	33	−23	10	Qualification for the relegation groups

Source: Futbolme.com
Rules for classification: 1) points; 2) head-to-head points; 3) head-to-head goal difference; 4) goal difference; 5) number of goals scored
(C) Champions

=== Group 13 – Region of Murcia ===
==== Teams and locations ====
Location of teams of the 2020–21 Tercera División Group XIII
Red: Subgroup A; Green: Subgroup B

Team	City	Home ground
Águilas	Águilas	El Rubial
Atlético Pulpileño	Pulpí	San Miguel
Bullense	Bullas	Nicolás de las Peñas
Cartagena B	Cartagena	Ciudad Jardín
Cartagena FC	Cartagena	Gómez Meseguer
Ciudad de Murcia	Murcia	José Barnés
Churra	Churra, Murcia	Municipal
Deportiva Minera	Llano del Beal, Cartagena	Ángel Cedrán
El Palmar	El Palmar, Murcia	Municipal
Huércal-Overa (El Castillo)	Huércal-Overa	El Hornillo
La Unión	La Unión	Municipal
Lorca FC	Lorca	Francisco Artés Carrasco
Los Garres	Murcia	Las Tejeras
Mar Menor	San Javier	Pitín
Mazarrón	Mazarrón	Municipal
Minerva	Alumbres, Cartagena	El Secante
Muleño	Mula	Municipal
Murcia Imperial	Murcia	Campus Universitario
Olímpico	Totana	Juan Cayuela
Plus Ultra	Llano de Brujas, Murcia	Municipal
Racing Murcia	Dolores de Pacheco, Torre-Pacheco	Polideportivo Municipal
UCAM Murcia B	Sangonera la Verde	El Mayayo

==== Subgroup A ====
Pos	Team	Pld	W	D	L	GF	GA	GD	Pts	Qualification
1	Murcia Imperial (C)	20	13	5	2	36	14	+22	44 (Note: Murcia Imperial finished ahead of Águilas on head-to-head points: Murcia Imperial-Águilas 2–0, Águilas-Murcia Imperial 0–0.)	Ineligible for promotion
2	Águilas	20	13	5	2	43	8	+35	44	Qualification for the promotion groups
3	Atlético Pulpileño	20	12	7	1	30	11	+19	43	Qualification for the promotion groups
4	Los Garres	20	7	6	7	22	21	+1	27 (Note: Los Garres finished ahead of Bullense on goal difference.)	Qualification for the promotion play-off groups
5	Bullense	20	7	6	7	23	25	−2	27	Qualification for the promotion play-off groups
6	UCAM Murcia B	20	6	8	6	28	23	+5	26	Qualification for the promotion play-off groups
7	Olímpico Totana	20	6	5	9	17	23	−6	23	Qualification for the relegation groups
8	El Palmar	20	5	7	8	26	28	−2	22	Qualification for the relegation groups
9	Minerva	20	6	2	12	24	36	−12	20	Qualification for the relegation groups
10	Churra	20	4	4	12	17	36	−19	16	Qualification for the relegation groups
11	Plus Ultra	20	2	3	15	11	52	−41	9	Qualification for the relegation groups

Source: Futbolme.com
Rules for classification: 1) points; 2) head-to-head points; 3) head-to-head goal difference; 4) goal difference; 5) number of goals scored
(C) Champions

==== Subgroup B ====
Pos	Team	Pld	W	D	L	GF	GA	GD	Pts	Qualification
1	Mar Menor (C)	20	13	4	3	27	12	+15	43	Qualification for the promotion groups
2	Cartagena B	20	11	7	2	38	10	+28	40	Qualification for the promotion groups
3	Racing Murcia	20	10	7	3	25	9	+16	37	Qualification for the promotion groups
4	La Unión Atlético	20	10	6	4	33	19	+14	36	Qualification for the promotion play-off groups
5	Cartagena FC	20	9	5	6	30	27	+3	32	Qualification for the promotion play-off groups
6	Mazarrón	20	7	5	8	21	19	+2	26	Qualification for the promotion play-off groups
7	Deportiva Minera	20	5	9	6	18	20	−2	24	Qualification for the relegation groups
8	Huércal-Overa (El Castillo)	20	6	4	10	17	27	−10	22	Qualification for the relegation groups
9	Ciudad de Murcia	20	5	6	9	13	18	−5	21	Qualification for the relegation groups
10	Muleño	20	4	4	12	18	31	−13	16	Qualification for the relegation groups
11	Lorca FC	20	1	1	18	9	57	−48	4	Qualification for the relegation groups

Source: Futbolme.com
Rules for classification: 1) points; 2) head-to-head points; 3) head-to-head goal difference; 4) goal difference; 5) number of goals scored
(C) Champions

=== Group 14 – Extremadura ===
==== Teams and locations ====
Location of teams of the 2020–21 Tercera División Group XIV
Red: Subgroup A; Green: Subgroup B

Team	City	Home ground
Aceuchal	Aceuchal	Municipal
Arroyo	Arroyo de la Luz	Municipal
Azuaga	Azuaga	Municipal
Cacereño	Cáceres	Príncipe Felipe
Calamonte	Calamonte	Municipal
Campanario	Campanario	Municipal El Ejido
Chinato	Malpartida de Plasencia	Era de las Matas
Coria	Coria	La Isla
Diocesano	Cáceres	Campos de la Federación
Extremadura B	Almendralejo	Tomás de la Hera
Fuente de Cantos	Fuente de Cantos	Francisco de Zurbarán
Jerez	Jerez de los Caballeros	Manuel Calzado Galván
Llerenense	Llerena	Fernando Robina
Lobón	Lobón	Municipal
Miajadas	Miajadas	Municipal
Montijo	Montijo	Municipal
Moralo	Navalmoral de la Mata	Municipal
Olivenza	Olivenza	Municipal
Plasencia	Plasencia	Ciudad Deportiva
Racing Valverdeño	Valverde de Leganés	San Roque
Trujillo	Trujillo	Julián García de Guadiana
Valdivia	Valdivia, Villanueva de la Serena	Primero de Mayo

==== Subgroup A ====
Pos	Team	Pld	W	D	L	GF	GA	GD	Pts	Qualification
1	Montijo (C)	20	15	4	1	34	5	+29	49	Qualification for the promotion groups
2	Coria	20	14	3	3	36	14	+22	45	Qualification for the promotion groups
3	Moralo	20	12	6	2	28	9	+19	42	Qualification for the promotion groups
4	Extremadura B	20	9	6	5	28	14	+14	33	Qualification for the promotion play-off groups
5	Plasencia	20	7	9	4	27	14	+13	30	Qualification for the promotion play-off groups
6	Aceuchal	20	6	6	8	19	25	−6	24	Qualification for the promotion play-off groups
7	Calamonte	20	5	8	7	23	25	−2	23	Qualification for the relegation groups
8	Chinato	20	4	3	13	17	32	−15	15 (Note: Chinato finished ahead of Campanario on head-to-head points: Chinato-Campanario 2–0, Campanario-Chinato 1–0.)	Qualification for the relegation groups
9	Campanario	20	4	3	13	13	35	−22	15	Qualification for the relegation groups
10	Valdivia	20	3	4	13	14	44	−30	13	Qualification for the relegation groups
11	Lobón	20	2	6	12	10	32	−22	12	Qualification for the relegation groups

Source: Futbolme.com
Rules for classification: 1) points; 2) head-to-head points; 3) head-to-head goal difference; 4) goal difference; 5) number of goals scored
(C) Champions

==== Subgroup B ====
Pos	Team	Pld	W	D	L	GF	GA	GD	Pts	Qualification
1	Cacereño (C)	20	16	2	2	43	9	+34	50	Qualification for the promotion groups
2	Diocesano	20	13	5	2	37	12	+25	44	Qualification for the promotion groups
3	Jerez	20	11	3	6	23	16	+7	36	Qualification for the promotion groups
4	Miajadas	20	7	7	6	21	19	+2	28	Qualification for the promotion play-off groups
5	Arroyo	20	7	4	9	15	24	−9	25	Qualification for the promotion play-off groups
6	Azuaga	20	5	8	7	18	25	−7	23	Qualification for the promotion play-off groups
7	Llerenense	20	5	7	8	14	26	−12	22	Qualification for the relegation groups
8	Trujillo	20	4	7	9	25	28	−3	19 (Note: Trujillo finished ahead of Racing Valverdeño on head-to-head points: Trujillo-Racing Valverdeño 1–2, Racing Valverdeño-Trujillo 0–3.)	Qualification for the relegation groups
9	Racing Valverdeño	20	5	4	11	13	33	−20	19	Qualification for the relegation groups
10	Olivenza	20	3	9	8	20	26	−6	18	Qualification for the relegation groups
11	Fuente de Cantos	20	4	4	12	18	29	−11	16	Qualification for the relegation groups

Source: Futbolme.com
Rules for classification: 1) points; 2) head-to-head points; 3) head-to-head goal difference; 4) goal difference; 5) number of goals scored
(C) Champions

=== Group 15 – Navarre ===
==== Teams and locations ====
Location of teams of the 2020–21 Tercera División Group XV
Red: Subgroup A; Green: Subgroup B

Team	City	Home ground
Ardoi	Zizur Mayor	El Pinar
Atlético Cirbonero	Cintruénigo	San Juan
Baztán	Baztán	Giltxaurdi
Beti Kozkor	Lekunberri	Plazaola
Beti Onak	Villava	Lorenzo Goikoa
Bidezarra	Noáin	Municipal El Soto
Burladés	Burlada	Ripagaina
Cantolagua	Sangüesa	Cantolagua
Corellano	Corella	José Luis de Arrese
Cortes	Cortes	San Francisco Javier
Fontellas	Fontellas	Nuevo Secarales
Huarte	Huarte/Uharte	Areta
Lourdes	Tudela	Luis Asarta
Murchante	Murchante	San Roque
Pamplona	Pamplona	Bidezarra
Peña Azagresa	Azagra	Miguel Sola
Peña Sport	Tafalla	San Francisco
River Ega	Andosilla	Andola
San Juan	Pamplona	San Juan
Subiza	Subiza	Sotoburu
Txantrea	Pamplona	Txantrea
Valle de Egüés	Egüés	Sarriguren

==== Subgroup A ====
Pos	Team	Pld	W	D	L	GF	GA	GD	Pts	Qualification
1	San Juan (C)	20	9	8	3	21	9	+12	35	Qualification for the promotion groups
2	Beti Kozkor	20	9	6	5	23	18	+5	33	Qualification for the promotion groups
3	Valle de Egüés	20	9	5	6	31	23	+8	32	Qualification for the promotion groups
4	Huarte	20	7	9	4	29	23	+6	30 (Note: Huarte finished ahead of Pamplona on head-to-head points: Huarte-Pamplona 1-0, Pamplona-Huarte 1-1.)	Qualification for the promotion play-off groups
5	Pamplona	20	8	6	6	28	18	+10	30	Qualification for the promotion play-off groups
6	Burladés	20	7	5	8	22	30	−8	26	Qualification for the promotion play-off groups
7	Beti Onak	20	5	9	6	26	25	+1	24 (Note: Beti Onak finished ahead of Corellano on head-to-head points: Beti Onak-Corellano 2-0, Corellano-Beti Onak 0-0.)	Qualification for the relegation groups
8	Corellano	20	6	6	8	24	29	−5	24	Qualification for the relegation groups
9	Txantrea	20	5	8	7	23	29	−6	23	Qualification for the relegation groups
10	Subiza	20	4	9	7	25	28	−3	21	Qualification for the relegation groups
11	River Ega	20	3	5	12	23	43	−20	14	Qualification for the relegation groups

Source: Futbolme.com
Rules for classification: 1) points; 2) head-to-head points; 3) head-to-head goal difference; 4) goal difference; 5) number of goals scored
(C) Champions

==== Subgroup B ====
Pos	Team	Pld	W	D	L	GF	GA	GD	Pts	Qualification
1	Peña Sport (C)	20	14	5	1	32	14	+18	47	Qualification for the promotion groups
2	Atlético Cirbonero	20	8	8	4	35	21	+14	32 (Note: Atlético Cirbonero finished ahead of Ardoi on head-to-head points: Ardoi-Atlético Cirbonero 1-1, Atlético Cirbonero-Ardoi 1-0.)	Qualification for the promotion groups
3	Ardoi	20	8	8	4	26	15	+11	32	Qualification for the promotion groups
4	Cantolagua	20	8	7	5	28	19	+9	31	Qualification for the promotion play-off groups
5	Cortes (Note: Fontellas was awarded a 0–3 win in their Round 6 match against Cortes after the latter fielded an ineligible player. The match had originally ended 4–0.)	20	7	7	6	18	21	−3	28	Qualification for the promotion play-off groups
6	Murchante	20	5	9	6	19	19	0	24 (Note: Murchante finished ahead of Peña Azagresa on goal difference.)	Qualification for the promotion play-off groups
7	Peña Azagresa	20	7	3	10	24	33	−9	24	Qualification for the relegation groups
8	Baztán	20	4	8	8	19	27	−8	20 (Note: Baztán finished ahead of Fontellas on head-to-head points: Fontellas-Baztán 1–2, Baztán-Fontellas 2–0.)	Qualification for the relegation groups
9	Fontellas	20	6	2	12	18	37	−19	20	Qualification for the relegation groups
10	Lourdes	20	4	7	9	18	26	−8	19 (Note: Lourdes finished ahead of Bidezarra on head-to-head points: Bidezarra-Lourdes 1–3, Lourdes-Bidezarra 1–0.)	Qualification for the relegation groups
11	Bidezarra	20	5	4	11	18	23	−5	19	Qualification for the relegation groups

Source: BeSoccer
Rules for classification: 1) points; 2) head-to-head points; 3) head-to-head goal difference; 4) goal difference; 5) number of goals scored
(C) Champions

=== Group 16 – La Rioja ===
==== Teams and locations ====
Location of teams of the 2020–21 Tercera División Group XVI
Red: Subgroup A; Green: Subgroup B

Team	City	Home ground
Agoncillo	Agoncillo	San Roque
Alberite	Alberite	Mariano Sáenz Andollo
Alfaro	Alfaro	La Molineta
Anguiano	Anguiano	Isla
Arnedo	Arnedo	Sendero
Atlético Vianés	Viana	Municipal
Berceo	Logroño	La Isla
Calahorra B	Calahorra	La Planilla
Calasancio	Logroño	La Estrella
Casalarreina	Casalarreina	El Soto
Comillas	Logroño	Mundial 82
La Calzada	Santo Domingo de La Calzada	El Rollo
Logroñés Promesas	Logroño	Mundial 82
Náxara	Nájera	La Salera
Oyonesa	Oyón	El Espinar
Pradejón	Pradejón	Municipal
Racing Rioja	Logroño	El Salvador
River Ebro	Rincón de Soto	San Miguel
Tedeón	Navarrete	San Miguel
Varea	Varea, Logroño	Municipal
Villegas	Logroño	La Ribera
Yagüe	Logroño	El Salvador

==== Subgroup A ====
Pos	Team	Pld	W	D	L	GF	GA	GD	Pts	Qualification
1	Alfaro (C)	20	14	3	3	35	14	+21	45	Qualification for the promotion groups
2	Anguiano	20	13	5	2	32	11	+21	44	Qualification for the promotion groups
3	Varea (Note: Alfaro was awarded a 0–3 win in their Round 13 match at Varea after the latter fielded an ineligible player. The match originally ended 1–0.)	20	12	5	3	48	12	+36	41	Qualification for the promotion groups
4	Arnedo	20	11	3	6	30	17	+13	36	Qualification for the promotion play-off groups
5	La Calzada	20	8	3	9	30	26	+4	27	Qualification for the promotion play-off groups
6	Oyonesa	20	7	4	9	24	22	+2	25	Qualification for the promotion play-off groups
7	Berceo	20	7	3	10	26	36	−10	24	Qualification for the relegation groups
8	Atlético Vianés	20	5	8	7	18	22	−4	23	Qualification for the relegation groups
9	Agoncillo	20	6	4	10	29	36	−7	22	Qualification for the relegation groups
10	Comillas	20	6	2	12	19	34	−15	20	Qualification for the relegation groups
11	Villegas	20	0	2	18	7	68	−61	2	Qualification for the relegation groups

Source: Futbolme.com
Rules for classification: 1) points; 2) head-to-head points; 3) head-to-head goal difference; 4) goal difference; 5) number of goals scored
(C) Champions

==== Subgroup B ====
Pos	Team	Pld	W	D	L	GF	GA	GD	Pts	Qualification
1	Racing Rioja (C)	20	14	3	3	46	14	+32	45	Qualification for the promotion groups
2	UD Logroñés B	20	11	6	3	31	18	+13	39 (Note: UD Logroñés B finished ahead of Náxara on head-to-head points: UD Logroñés B-Náxara 2–1, Náxara-UD Logroñés B 2–3)	Qualification for the promotion groups
3	Náxara	20	11	6	3	43	22	+21	39	Qualification for the promotion groups
4	Calahorra B	20	9	8	3	30	14	+16	35	Qualification for the promotion play-off groups
5	Yagüe	20	9	4	7	30	22	+8	31	Qualification for the promotion play-off groups
6	Casalarreina	20	8	3	9	27	26	+1	27	Qualification for the promotion play-off groups
7	River Ebro	20	6	6	8	19	26	−7	24	Qualification for the relegation groups
8	Tedeón	20	6	4	10	16	30	−14	22	Qualification for the relegation groups
9	Pradejón	20	3	7	10	21	35	−14	16	Qualification for the relegation groups
10	Calasancio	20	3	4	13	12	43	−31	13	Qualification for the relegation groups
11	Alberite	20	2	5	13	14	39	−25	11	Qualification for the relegation groups

Source: Futbolme.com
Rules for classification: 1) points; 2) head-to-head points; 3) head-to-head goal difference; 4) goal difference; 5) number of goals scored
(C) Champions

=== Group 17 – Aragon ===
==== Teams and locations ====
Location of teams of the 2020–21 Tercera División Group XVII
Red: Subgroup A; Green: Subgroup B

Team	City	Home ground
Almudévar	Almudévar	La Corona
Atlético Monzón	Monzón	Isidro Calderón
Barbastro	Barbastro	Municipal de los Deportes
Belchite 97	Belchite	Municipal
Binéfar	Binéfar	Los Olmos
Borja	Borja	Manuel Meler
Brea	Brea de Aragón	Piedrabuena
Calamocha	Calamocha	Jumaya
Cariñena	Cariñena	La Platera
Cuarte	Cuarte de Huerva	Nuevo Municipal
Deportivo Aragón	Zaragoza	Ciudad Deportiva
Épila	Épila	La Huerta
Fraga	Fraga	La Estacada
Huesca B	Huesca	San Jorge
Illueca	Illueca	Papa Luna
Robres	Robres	San Blas
San Juan	Zaragoza	
Sabiñánigo	Sabiñánigo	Joaquín Ascaso
Sariñena	Sariñena	El Carmen
Tamarite	Tamarite de Litera	La Colomina
Teruel	Teruel	Pinilla
Utebo	Utebo	Santa Ana
Valdefierro	Zaragoza	Valdefierro
Villanueva	Villanueva de Gállego	Nuevo Enrique Porta

==== Subgroup A ====
Pos	Team	Pld	W	D	L	GF	GA	GD	Pts	Qualification
1	Teruel (C)	22	15	4	3	34	11	+23	49	Qualification for the promotion groups
2	Huesca B	22	13	6	3	36	18	+18	45	Qualification for the promotion groups
3	Belchite 97	22	8	11	3	22	9	+13	35	Qualification for the promotion groups
4	Deportivo Aragón	22	8	10	4	32	14	+18	34 (Note: Deportivo Aragón finished ahead of Illueca on head-to-head points: Illueca-Deportivo Aragón 1–1, Deportivo Aragón-Illueca 2–0.)	Qualification for the promotion play-off groups
5	Illueca	22	9	7	6	23	16	+7	34	Qualification for the promotion play-off groups
6	Binéfar	22	8	8	6	29	17	+12	32	Qualification for the promotion play-off groups
7	Atlético Monzón	22	7	10	5	26	19	+7	31	Qualification for the relegation groups
8	Cariñena	22	7	6	9	21	23	−2	27	Qualification for the relegation groups
9	Tamarite	22	6	7	9	19	29	−10	25	Qualification for the relegation groups
10	Valdefierro	22	6	4	12	20	36	−16	22 (Note: Valdefierro finished ahead of Fraga on head-to-head points: Valdefierro-Fraga 0–0, Fraga-Valdefierro 0–1.)	Qualification for the relegation groups
11	Fraga	22	5	7	10	17	21	−4	22	Qualification for the relegation groups
12	San Juan (Note: San Juan deducted three points for failing to show up to their Round 1 match at Teruel. The team was subsequently excluded from the competition and all opponents were awarded 3–0 wins.) (D)	22	0	0	22	0	66	−66	−3	Qualification for the relegation groups

Source: Futbolme.com
Rules for classification: 1) points; 2) head-to-head points; 3) head-to-head goal difference; 4) goal difference; 5) number of goals scored
(C) Champions; (D) Disqualified

==== Subgroup B ====
Pos	Team	Pld	W	D	L	GF	GA	GD	Pts	Qualification
1	Brea (C)	22	12	6	4	34	12	+22	42	Qualification for the promotion groups
2	Cuarte	22	11	6	5	32	21	+11	39	Qualification for the promotion groups
3	Utebo	22	9	10	3	21	15	+6	37	Qualification for the promotion groups
4	Barbastro	22	9	9	4	27	18	+9	36	Qualification for the promotion play-off groups
5	Borja	22	8	7	7	29	23	+6	31	Qualification for the promotion play-off groups
6	Calamocha	22	7	9	6	24	19	+5	30	Qualification for the promotion play-off groups
7	Sariñena	22	8	5	9	36	36	0	29	Qualification for the relegation groups
8	Épila	22	5	11	6	23	23	0	26 (Note: Épila finished ahead of Robres on goal difference.)	Qualification for the relegation groups
9	Robres	22	6	8	8	23	31	−8	26	Qualification for the relegation groups
10	Almudévar	22	4	10	8	17	32	−15	22	Qualification for the relegation groups
11	Villanueva	22	4	6	12	16	39	−23	18	Qualification for the relegation groups
12	Sabiñánigo	22	3	5	14	24	37	−13	14	Qualification for the relegation groups

Source: Futbolme.com
Rules for classification: 1) points; 2) head-to-head points; 3) head-to-head goal difference; 4) goal difference; 5) number of goals scored
(C) Champions

=== Group 18 – Castilla-La Mancha ===
==== Teams and locations ====
Location of teams of the 2020–21 Tercera División Group XVIII
Red: Subgroup A; Green: Subgroup B

Team	City	Home ground
Almagro	Almagro	Manuel Trujillo
Almansa	Almansa	Paco Simón
Atlético Albacete	Albacete	Andrés Iniesta
Atlético Ibañés	Casas-Ibáñez	Municipal
Azuqueca	Azuqueca de Henares	San Miguel
Calvo Sotelo	Puertollano	Ciudad de Puertollano
Conquense	Cuenca	La Fuensanta
Guadalajara	Guadalajara	Pedro Escartín
Huracán Balazote	Balazote	Municipal de Barrax
Illescas	Illescas, Toledo	Municipal
La Roda	La Roda	Estadio Municipal
La Solana	La Solana	La Moheda
Madridejos	Madridejos	Nuevo Estadio
Manchego	Ciudad Real	Juan Carlos I
Manzanares	Manzanares	José Camacho
Marchamalo	Marchamalo	La Solana
Pedroñeras	Las Pedroñeras	Municipal
Quintanar del Rey	Quintanar del Rey	San Marcos
Tarancón	Tarancón	Municipal
Toledo	Toledo	Salto del Caballo
Torrijos	Torrijos	San Francisco
Villacañas	Villacañas	Las Pirámides

==== Subgroup A ====
Pos	Team	Pld	W	D	L	GF	GA	GD	Pts	Qualification
1	Atlético Albacete (C)	20	14	3	3	34	9	+25	45	Qualification for the promotion groups
2	Calvo Sotelo	20	13	5	2	38	13	+25	44	Qualification for the promotion groups
3	Quintanar del Rey	20	10	5	5	31	16	+15	35	Qualification for the promotion groups
4	Manchego	20	7	8	5	21	17	+4	29	Qualification for the promotion play-off groups
5	La Roda	20	8	4	8	16	22	−6	28	Qualification for the promotion play-off groups
6	Huracán Balazote	20	7	4	9	22	27	−5	25	Qualification for the promotion play-off groups
7	Atlético Ibañés	20	4	11	5	16	21	−5	23 (Note: Atlético Ibañés finished ahead of Almansa on head-to-head points: Atlético Ibañés-Almansa 1–0, Almansa-Atlético Ibañés 2–2.)	Qualification for the relegation groups
8	Almansa	20	6	5	9	19	25	−6	23	Qualification for the relegation groups
9	Manzanares	20	4	6	10	16	31	−15	18	Qualification for the relegation groups
10	La Solana	20	4	5	11	16	29	−13	17	Qualification for the relegation groups
11	Almagro	20	4	2	14	14	33	−19	14	Qualification for the relegation groups

Source: Futbolme.com
Rules for classification: 1) points; 2) head-to-head points; 3) head-to-head goal difference; 4) goal difference; 5) number of goals scored
(C) Champions

==== Subgroup B ====
Pos	Team	Pld	W	D	L	GF	GA	GD	Pts	Qualification
1	Marchamalo (C)	20	14	3	3	25	10	+15	45	Qualification for the promotion groups
2	Toledo	20	11	3	6	31	15	+16	36	Qualification for the promotion groups
3	Torrijos	20	8	8	4	25	18	+7	32	Qualification for the promotion groups
4	Guadalajara	20	9	4	7	27	21	+6	31	Qualification for the promotion play-off groups
5	Villacañas	20	8	6	6	19	16	+3	30	Qualification for the promotion play-off groups
6	Tarancón	20	9	2	9	24	19	+5	29	Qualification for the promotion play-off groups
7	Azuqueca	20	8	3	9	22	24	−2	27	Qualification for the relegation groups
8	Illescas	20	6	7	7	18	21	−3	25	Qualification for the relegation groups
9	Conquense (Note: Tarancón was awarded a 3–0 win in their Round 3 match against Conquense after the latter fielded an ineligible player. The match originally ended 1–2.)	20	6	4	10	16	24	−8	22	Qualification for the relegation groups
10	Madridejos	20	4	3	13	14	35	−21	15	Qualification for the relegation groups
11	Pedroñeras (Note: Conquense was awarded a 3–0 win in their Round 1 match against Pedroñeras after the latter failed to adhere to COVID-19 protocols.)	20	3	5	12	12	30	−18	14	Qualification for the relegation groups

Source: Futbolme.com
Rules for classification: 1) points; 2) head-to-head points; 3) head-to-head goal difference; 4) goal difference; 5) number of goals scored
(C) Champions

== Second phase ==
=== Promotion groups ===
==== Group 1C ====
Pos	Team	Pld	W	D	L	GF	GA	GD	Pts	Promotion or qualification
1	Arenteiro (P)	28	18	8	2	45	17	+28	62	Promotion to Segunda División RFEF
2	Bergantiños (P)	28	17	6	5	47	27	+20	57	Promotion to Segunda División RFEF
3	Arosa (O, P)	28	15	8	5	37	20	+17	53	Qualification for promotion play-offs
4	Polvorín	28	15	6	7	40	23	+17	51	Qualification for promotion play-offs
5	Somozas	28	13	5	10	44	33	+11	44	Qualification for promotion play-offs
6	Alondras	28	11	10	7	38	24	+14	43	Qualification for promotion play-offs

Source: Futbolme.com
Rules for classification: 1) points; 2) head-to-head points; 3) head-to-head goal difference; 4) goal difference; 5) number of goals scored
(O) Play-off winners; (P) Promoted

==== Group 2C ====
Pos	Team	Pld	W	D	L	GF	GA	GD	Pts	PPG	Promotion or qualification
1	Ceares (P)	26	16	6	4	38	25	+13	54	2.08	Promotion to Segunda División RFEF
2	Llanera (P)	26	15	5	6	46	35	+11	50	1.92	Promotion to Segunda División RFEF
3	L'Entregu	24	14	3	7	36	19	+17	45	1.88	Qualification for promotion play-offs
4	San Martín	24	12	8	4	44	29	+15	44	1.83	Qualification for promotion play-offs
5	Avilés (O, P)	26	13	8	5	39	19	+20	47	1.81	Qualification for promotion play-offs
6	Llanes	24	10	6	8	34	25	+9	36	1.50	Qualification for promotion play-offs

Source: Futbolme.com
Rules for classification: 1) points per game; per RFEF: 2) points; 3) head-to-head points; 4) head-to-head goal difference; 5) goal difference; 6) number of goals scored
(O) Play-off winners; (P) Promoted

==== Group 3C ====
Pos	Team	Pld	W	D	L	GF	GA	GD	Pts	Promotion or qualification
1	Cayón (P)	26	18	5	3	52	20	+32	59	Promotion to Segunda División RFEF
2	Rayo Cantabria (P)	26	16	6	4	52	23	+29	54	Promotion to Segunda División RFEF
3	Tropezón (O, P)	26	14	10	2	49	26	+23	52	Qualification for promotion play-offs
4	Siete Villas	26	16	3	7	39	25	+14	51	Qualification for promotion play-offs
5	Gimnástica Torrelavega	26	13	7	6	49	26	+23	46	Qualification for promotion play-offs
6	Escobedo	26	13	5	8	32	27	+5	44	Qualification for promotion play-offs

Source: Futbolme.com
Rules for classification: 1) points; 2) head-to-head points; 3) head-to-head goal difference; 4) goal difference; 5) number of goals scored
(O) Play-off winners; (P) Promoted

==== Group 4C ====
Pos	Team	Pld	W	D	L	GF	GA	GD	Pts	Promotion or qualification
1	Gernika (P)	26	18	5	3	52	20	+32	59	Promotion to Segunda División RFEF
2	Real Sociedad C (P)	26	17	5	4	61	30	+31	56	Promotion to Segunda División RFEF
3	Sestao River (O, P)	26	16	5	5	49	16	+33	53	Qualification for promotion play-offs
4	Vitoria	26	9	10	7	23	11	+12	37	Qualification for promotion play-offs
5	Urduliz	26	9	9	8	31	28	+3	36	Qualification for promotion play-offs
6	Pasaia	26	9	8	9	25	29	−4	35	Qualification for promotion play-offs

Source: Futbolme.com
Rules for classification: 1) points; 2) head-to-head points; 3) head-to-head goal difference; 4) goal difference; 5) number of goals scored
(O) Play-off winners; (P) Promoted

==== Group 5C ====
Pos	Team	Pld	W	D	L	GF	GA	GD	Pts	Promotion or qualification
1	Europa (P)	26	18	5	3	46	23	+23	59	Promotion to Segunda División RFEF
2	Vilafranca (Note: Lleida Esportiu, Vilafranca's associate team qualified for the Segunda División RFEF next season, thus Vilafranca vacated its promotion spot. However, had Lleida got a place in Primera División RFEF for administrative reasons, Vilafranca would have been promoted to Segunda RFEF.)	26	14	8	4	40	24	+16	50	Ineligible for promotion
3	Terrassa (Note: Terrassa won the right to have the promotion place that belonged to Vilafranca. The team still had to play the promotion play-off due to league regulations.) (P)	26	14	6	6	35	18	+17	48	Promotion to Segunda División RFEF, qualification for promotion play-offs
4	Girona B	26	13	8	5	36	20	+16	47	Qualification for promotion play-offs
5	Cerdanyola del Vallès (O, P)	26	11	8	7	37	27	+10	41	Qualification for promotion play-offs
6	Granollers	26	10	6	10	38	34	+4	36	Qualification for promotion play-offs

Source: Futbolme.com
Rules for classification: 1) points; 2) head-to-head points; 3) head-to-head goal difference; 4) goal difference; 5) number of goals scored
(O) Play-off winners; (P) Promoted

==== Group 6C ====
Pos	Team	Pld	W	D	L	GF	GA	GD	Pts	PPG	Promotion or qualification
1	Eldense (P)	24	13	8	3	33	15	+18	47	1.96	Promotion to Segunda División RFEF
2	Alzira (P)	26	13	11	2	35	15	+20	50	1.92	Promotion to Segunda División RFEF
3	Intercity (O, P)	24	11	11	2	33	11	+22	44	1.83	Qualification for promotion play-offs
4	Elche Ilicitano	24	12	7	5	36	21	+15	43	1.79	Qualification for promotion play-offs
5	Roda	26	11	10	5	32	20	+12	43	1.65	Qualification for promotion play-offs
6	Atlético Saguntino	26	8	14	4	31	29	+2	38	1.46	Qualification for promotion play-offs

Source: Futbolme.com
Rules for classification: 1) points per game; per RFEF: 2) points; 3) head-to-head points; 4) head-to-head goal difference; 5) goal difference; 6) number of goals scored
(O) Play-off winners; (P) Promoted

==== Group 7C ====
Pos	Team	Pld	W	D	L	GF	GA	GD	Pts	PPG	Promotion or qualification
1	Leganés B (P)	26	17	5	4	42	22	+20	56	2.15	Promotion to Segunda División RFEF
2	Unión Adarve (P)	28	18	6	4	51	22	+29	60	2.14	Promotion to Segunda División RFEF
3	Móstoles URJC (O, P)	26	15	6	5	35	16	+19	51	1.96	Qualification for promotion play-offs
4	Moratalaz	28	14	8	6	41	24	+17	50	1.79	Qualification for promotion play-offs
5	Alcorcón B	26	11	8	7	37	21	+16	41	1.58	Qualification for promotion play-offs
6	Rayo Vallecano B	28	12	8	8	41	38	+3	44	1.57	Qualification for promotion play-offs

Source: Futbolme.com
Rules for classification: 1) points per game; per RFEF: 2) points; 3) head-to-head points; 4) head-to-head goal difference; 5) goal difference; 6) number of goals scored
(O) Play-off winners; (P) Promoted

==== Group 8C ====
Pos	Team	Pld	W	D	L	GF	GA	GD	Pts	PPG	Promotion or qualification
1	Gimnástica Segoviana (P)	28	21	5	2	63	13	+50	68	2.43	Promotion to Segunda División RFEF
2	Cristo Atlético (P)	26	17	3	6	36	17	+19	54	2.08	Promotion to Segunda División RFEF
3	Atlético Astorga	26	13	7	6	37	16	+21	46	1.77	Qualification for promotion play-offs
4	Burgos Promesas (O, P)	28	13	9	6	37	23	+14	48	1.71	Qualification for promotion play-offs
5	Numancia B (Note: Since Numancia's first team qualified for the Segunda División RFEF next season, the second team vacated its play-off qualification.)	28	13	5	10	43	42	+1	44	1.57	Ineligible for promotion
6	Júpiter Leonés	26	9	11	6	26	23	+3	38	1.46	Qualification for promotion play-offs

Source: Futbolme.com
Rules for classification: 1) points per game; per RFEF: 2) points; 3) head-to-head points; 4) head-to-head goal difference; 5) goal difference; 6) number of goals scored
(O) Play-off winners; (P) Promoted

==== Group 9C ====
Pos	Team	Pld	W	D	L	GF	GA	GD	Pts	PPG	Promotion or qualification
1	Vélez (P)	24	14	7	3	32	20	+12	49	2.04	Promotion to Segunda División RFEF
2	Atlético Mancha Real (P)	26	13	8	5	42	17	+25	47	1.81	Promotion to Segunda División RFEF
3	Ciudad de Torredonjimeno	26	11	8	7	40	31	+9	41	1.58	Qualification for promotion play-offs
4	Antequera (O, P)	24	9	9	6	32	15	+17	36 (Note: Antequera finished ahead of Almería B on head-to-head points: Almería B-Antequera 1–1, Antequera-Almería B 1–0.)	1.50	Qualification for promotion play-offs
5	Almería B	26	10	9	7	38	31	+7	39	1.50	Qualification for promotion play-offs
6	El Palo	24	8	8	8	22	26	−4	32	1.33	Qualification for promotion play-offs

Source: Futbolme.com
Rules for classification: 1) points per game; per RFEF: 2) points; 3) head-to-head points; 4) head-to-head goal difference; 5) goal difference; 6) number of goals scored
(O) Play-off winners; (P) Promoted

==== Group 10C ====
Pos	Team	Pld	W	D	L	GF	GA	GD	Pts	PPG	Promotion or qualification
1	Xerez Deportivo (P)	24	15	5	4	37	17	+20	50	2.08	Promotion to Segunda División RFEF
2	San Roque de Lepe (P)	26	16	4	6	35	24	+11	52	2.00	Promotion to Segunda División RFEF
3	Ciudad de Lucena	26	15	5	6	43	22	+21	50	1.92	Qualification for promotion play-offs
4	Xerez	24	13	6	5	29	17	+12	45	1.88	Qualification for promotion play-offs
5	Puente Genil	26	10	8	8	37	35	+2	38	1.46	Qualification for promotion play-offs
6	Ceuta (O, P)	24	8	10	6	32	27	+5	34	1.42	Qualification for promotion play-offs

Source: Futbolme.com
Rules for classification: 1) points per game; per RFEF: 2) points; 3) head-to-head points; 4) head-to-head goal difference; 5) goal difference; 6) number of goals scored
(O) Play-off winners; (P) Promoted

==== Group 11C ====
Pos	Team	Pld	W	D	L	GF	GA	GD	Pts	Promotion or qualification
1	Ibiza Islas Pitiusas (P)	26	16	7	3	51	14	+37	55	Promotion to Segunda División RFEF
2	Andratx (P)	26	16	3	7	41	24	+17	51	Promotion to Segunda División RFEF
3	Platges de Calvià	26	14	8	4	34	18	+16	50	Qualification for promotion play-offs
4	Formentera (O, P)	26	14	6	6	44	27	+17	48	Qualification for promotion play-offs
5	Constància	26	13	8	5	31	17	+14	47	Qualification for promotion play-offs
6	Sant Jordi	26	13	6	7	36	31	+5	45	Qualification for promotion play-offs

Source: Futbolme.com
Rules for classification: 1) points; 2) head-to-head points; 3) head-to-head goal difference; 4) goal difference; 5) number of goals scored
(O) Play-off winners; (P) Promoted

==== Group 12C ====
Pos	Team	Pld	W	D	L	GF	GA	GD	Pts	PPG	Promotion, qualification or relegation
1	Mensajero (P)	26	15	5	6	38	25	+13	50	1.92	Promotion to Segunda División RFEF
2	Panadería Pulido (P)	24	12	7	5	32	22	+10	43	1.79	Promotion to Segunda División RFEF
3	San Fernando (O, P)	24	13	3	8	38	28	+10	42	1.75	Qualification for promotion play-offs
4	Tenisca	26	13	6	7	49	31	+18	45	1.73	Qualification for promotion play-offs
5	Atlético Paso	26	10	10	6	36	23	+13	40	1.54	Qualification for promotion play-offs
6	Las Palmas C (Note: Since UD Las Palmas's second team qualified for the Segunda División RFEF next season, the third team Las Palmas C vacated its play-off qualification.)	24	10	4	10	32	33	−1	34	1.42	Ineligible for promotion

Source: Futbolme.com
Rules for classification: 1) points per game; per RFEF: 2) points; 3) head-to-head points; 4) head-to-head goal difference; 5) goal difference; 6) number of goals scored
(O) Play-off winners; (P) Promoted

==== Group 13C ====
Pos	Team	Pld	W	D	L	GF	GA	GD	Pts	Promotion or qualification
1	Águilas (P)	26	16	6	4	49	13	+36	54 (Note: Águilas finished ahead of Atlético Pulpileño on head-to-head goals: Atlético Pulpileño-Águilas 1–0, Águilas-Atlético Pulpileño 3–0.)	Promotion to Segunda División RFEF
2	Atlético Pulpileño (P)	26	15	9	2	34	13	+21	54	Promotion to Segunda División RFEF
3	Mar Menor (O, P)	26	15	6	5	29	14	+15	51	Qualification for promotion play-offs
4	Cartagena B	26	14	7	5	45	16	+29	49	Qualification for promotion play-offs
5	Racing Murcia	26	12	10	4	30	12	+18	46 (Note: Racing Murcia finished ahead of Murcia Imperial on head-to-head points: Murcia Imperial-Racing Murcia 0–2, Racing Murcia-Murcia Imperial 0–0.)	Qualification for promotion play-offs
6	Murcia Imperial (Note: Since Real Murcia's first team qualified for the Segunda División RFEF next season, the second team Murcia Imperial vacated its play-off qualification.)	26	13	7	6	37	21	+16	46	Ineligible for promotion

Source: Futbolme.com
Rules for classification: 1) points; 2) head-to-head points; 3) head-to-head goal difference; 4) goal difference; 5) number of goals scored
(O) Play-off winners; (P) Promoted

==== Group 14C ====
Pos	Team	Pld	W	D	L	GF	GA	GD	Pts	Promotion or qualification
1	Cacereño (P)	26	18	5	3	47	11	+36	59	Promotion to Segunda División RFEF
2	Montijo (P)	26	17	7	2	39	9	+30	58	Promotion to Segunda División RFEF
3	Coria (O, P)	26	17	6	3	42	15	+27	57	Qualification for promotion play-offs
4	Moralo	26	15	6	5	36	15	+21	51	Qualification for promotion play-offs
5	Diocesano	26	14	7	5	41	20	+21	49	Qualification for promotion play-offs
6	Jerez	26	12	4	10	26	25	+1	40	Qualification for promotion play-offs

Source: Futbolme.com
Rules for classification: 1) points; 2) head-to-head points; 3) head-to-head goal difference; 4) goal difference; 5) number of goals scored
(O) Play-off winners; (P) Promoted

==== Group 15C ====
Pos	Team	Pld	W	D	L	GF	GA	GD	Pts	Promotion or qualification
1	Peña Sport (P)	26	16	6	4	40	27	+13	54	Promotion to Segunda División RFEF
2	San Juan (P)	26	13	10	3	31	10	+21	49	Promotion to Segunda División RFEF
3	Beti Kozkor	26	12	7	7	32	27	+5	43	Qualification for promotion play-offs
4	Ardoi (O, P)	26	11	9	6	37	20	+17	42	Qualification for promotion play-offs
5	Atlético Cirbonero	26	10	10	6	40	26	+14	40	Qualification for promotion play-offs
6	Valle de Egüés	26	9	6	11	35	37	−2	33	Qualification for promotion play-offs

Source: Futbolme.com
Rules for classification: 1) points; 2) head-to-head points; 3) head-to-head goal difference; 4) goal difference; 5) number of goals scored
(O) Play-off winners; (P) Promoted

==== Group 16C ====
Pos	Team	Pld	W	D	L	GF	GA	GD	Pts	Promotion or qualification
1	Racing Rioja (P)	26	17	6	3	59	23	+36	57	Promotion to Segunda División RFEF
2	Náxara (P)	26	15	8	3	56	29	+27	53	Promotion to Segunda División RFEF
3	Alfaro	26	16	4	6	41	22	+19	52	Qualification for promotion play-offs
4	UD Logroñés B (O, P)	26	13	8	5	39	23	+16	47 (Note: Logroñés B finished ahead of Anguiano on head-to-head points: Anguiano-Logroñés 0–0, Logroñés B-Anguiano 3–1.)	Qualification for promotion play-offs
5	Anguiano	26	13	8	5	40	24	+16	47	Qualification for promotion play-offs
6	Varea	26	12	8	6	54	24	+30	44	Qualification for promotion play-offs

Source: Futbolme.com
Rules for classification: 1) points; 2) head-to-head points; 3) head-to-head goal difference; 4) goal difference; 5) number of goals scored
(O) Play-off winners; (P) Promoted

==== Group 17C ====
Pos	Team	Pld	W	D	L	GF	GA	GD	Pts	Promotion or qualification
1	Teruel (P)	28	17	6	5	42	17	+25	57	Promotion to Segunda División RFEF
2	Brea (P)	28	16	7	5	39	14	+25	55 (Note: Brea finished ahead of Huesca B on head-to-head points: Huesca B-Brea 0–0, Brea-Huesca B 1–0.)	Promotion to Segunda División RFEF
3	Huesca B (O, P)	28	16	7	5	42	23	+19	55	Qualification for promotion play-offs
4	Cuarte	28	12	9	7	36	27	+9	45	Qualification for promotion play-offs
5	Belchite 97	28	10	13	5	26	13	+13	43	Qualification for promotion play-offs
6	Utebo	28	10	11	7	27	25	+2	41	Qualification for promotion play-offs

Source: Futbolme.com
Rules for classification: 1) points; 2) head-to-head points; 3) head-to-head goal difference; 4) goal difference; 5) number of goals scored
(O) Play-off winners; (P) Promoted

==== Group 18C ====
Pos	Team	Pld	W	D	L	GF	GA	GD	Pts	Promotion or qualification
1	Marchamalo (P)	26	17	3	6	33	16	+17	54	Promotion to Segunda División RFEF
2	Calvo Sotelo (P)	26	14	7	5	45	22	+23	49	Promotion to Segunda División RFEF
3	Toledo (O, P)	26	14	6	6	43	19	+24	48 (Note: Toledo finished ahead of Atlético Albacete on head-to-head points: Toledo-Atlético Albacete 2–1, Atlético Albacete-Toledo 0–1.)	Qualification for promotion play-offs
4	Atlético Albacete	26	15	3	8	41	19	+22	48	Qualification for promotion play-offs
5	Quintanar del Rey	26	12	8	6	35	24	+11	44	Qualification for promotion play-offs
6	Torrijos	26	11	10	5	32	23	+9	43	Qualification for promotion play-offs

Source: Futbolme.com
Rules for classification: 1) points; 2) head-to-head points; 3) head-to-head goal difference; 4) goal difference; 5) number of goals scored
(O) Play-off winners; (P) Promoted

=== Promotion play-off groups ===
==== Group 1 ====
Pos	Team	Pld	W	D	L	GF	GA	GD	Pts	Qualification
1	Estradense	28	13	7	8	49	40	+9	46	Qualification for promotion play-offs
2	Choco	28	12	9	7	45	28	+17	45	Qualification for promotion play-offs
3	Vilalbés	28	13	5	10	39	35	+4	44	
4	Rápido Bouzas	28	11	8	9	33	29	+4	41	
5	Deportivo Fabril	28	11	7	10	49	35	+14	40	
6	Silva	28	7	9	12	24	42	−18	30	

Source: Futbolme.com
Rules for classification: 1) points; 2) head-to-head points; 3) head-to-head goal difference; 4) goal difference; 5) number of goals scored

==== Group 2 ====
Pos	Team	Pld	W	D	L	GF	GA	GD	Pts	PPG	Qualification
1	Tuilla	24	11	7	6	33	24	+9	40	1.67	Qualification for promotion play-offs
2	Caudal	26	12	7	7	43	28	+15	43	1.65	Qualification for promotion play-offs
3	Gijón Industrial	26	10	6	10	42	34	+8	36 (Note: Gijón Industrial finished ahead of Lenense on head-to-head points: Gijón Industrial-Lenense 2–1, Lenense-Gijón Industrial 0–1.)	1.38	
4	Lenense	26	11	3	12	32	31	+1	36	1.38	
5	Urraca	24	7	9	8	16	21	−5	30	1.25	
6	Real Titánico	24	7	6	11	25	36	−11	27	1.13	

Source: Futbolme.com
Rules for classification: 1) points per game; per RFEF: 2) points; 3) head-to-head points; 4) head-to-head goal difference; 5) goal difference; 6) number of goals scored

==== Group 3 ====
Pos	Team	Pld	W	D	L	GF	GA	GD	Pts	Qualification
1	Vimenor	26	13	7	6	44	25	+19	46 (Note: Vimenor finished ahead of Sámano on goal difference.)	Qualification for promotion play-offs
2	Sámano	26	13	7	6	39	26	+13	46	Qualification for promotion play-offs
3	Textil Escudo	26	11	7	8	37	29	+8	40	
4	Cartes	26	10	6	10	31	34	−3	36	
5	Selaya	26	9	4	13	31	44	−13	31	
6	Atlético Albericia	26	8	6	12	40	42	−2	30	

Source: Futbolme.com
Rules for classification: 1) points; 2) head-to-head points; 3) head-to-head goal difference; 4) goal difference; 5) number of goals scored

==== Group 4 ====
Pos	Team	Pld	W	D	L	GF	GA	GD	Pts	Qualification
1	Anaitasuna	26	11	10	5	33	23	+10	43	Qualification for promotion play-offs
2	Deusto	26	12	6	8	34	31	+3	42	Qualification for promotion play-offs
3	Santutxu	26	11	6	9	26	31	−5	39	
4	Basconia	26	8	12	6	29	20	+9	36 (Note: Basconia finished ahead of San Ignacio on head-to-head points: Basconia-San Ignacio 2–3, San Ignacio-Basconia 0–2.)	
5	San Ignacio	26	9	9	8	23	24	−1	36	
6	Beasain	26	8	10	8	24	21	+3	34	

Source: Futbolme.com
Rules for classification: 1) points; 2) head-to-head points; 3) head-to-head goal difference; 4) goal difference; 5) number of goals scored

==== Group 5 ====
Pos	Team	Pld	W	D	L	GF	GA	GD	Pts	Qualification
1	Sant Andreu	26	12	6	8	30	23	+7	42	Qualification for promotion play-offs
2	Vilassar de Mar	26	9	11	6	28	27	+1	38	Qualification for promotion play-offs
3	Manresa	26	8	13	5	23	17	+6	37	
4	Castelldefels	26	9	9	8	25	27	−2	36	
5	San Cristóbal	26	8	10	8	23	23	0	34	
6	Grama	26	9	6	11	27	34	−7	33	

Source: Futbolme.com
Rules for classification: 1) points; 2) head-to-head points; 3) head-to-head goal difference; 4) goal difference; 5) number of goals scored

==== Group 6 ====
Pos	Team	Pld	W	D	L	GF	GA	GD	Pts	PPG	Qualification
1	Villarreal C	26	10	13	3	41	19	+22	43	1.65	Qualification for promotion play-offs
2	Silla	26	9	11	6	31	26	+5	38	1.46	Qualification for promotion play-offs
3	Olímpic	24	10	5	9	30	34	−4	35	1.46	
4	Recambios Colón	26	7	10	9	26	28	−2	31	1.19	
5	Jove Español	24	6	5	13	19	31	−12	23	0.96	
6	Benigànim	24	5	7	12	19	42	−23	22	0.92	

Source: Futbolme.com
Rules for classification: 1) points per game; per RFEF: 2) points; 3) head-to-head points; 4) head-to-head goal difference; 5) goal difference; 6) number of goals scored

==== Group 7 ====
Pos	Team	Pld	W	D	L	GF	GA	GD	Pts	PPG	Qualification
1	Torrejon	28	12	11	5	43	21	+22	47	1.68	Qualification for promotion play-offs
2	Pozuelo de Alarcón	28	12	9	7	41	28	+13	45	1.61	Qualification for promotion play-offs
3	Flat Earth	28	10	8	10	22	28	−6	38	1.36	
4	Parla	26	8	9	9	26	27	−1	33	1.27	
5	Carabanchel	26	7	11	8	29	32	−3	32	1.23	
6	Trival Valderas	26	7	10	9	20	24	−4	31	1.19	

Source: Futbolme.com
Rules for classification: 1) points per game; per RFEF: 2) points; 3) head-to-head points; 4) head-to-head goal difference; 5) goal difference; 6) number of goals scored

==== Group 8 ====
Pos	Team	Pld	W	D	L	GF	GA	GD	Pts	PPG	Qualification
1	Arandina	28	13	7	8	49	34	+15	46	1.64	Qualification for promotion play-offs
2	Mirandés B	28	12	9	7	42	30	+12	45 (Note: Mirandés B finished ahead of Ávila on goal difference.)	1.61	Qualification for promotion play-offs
3	Ávila	28	13	6	9	35	27	+8	45	1.61	Qualification for promotion play-offs
4	La Virgen del Camino	26	9	10	7	30	31	−1	37	1.42	
5	Atlético Tordesillas	26	10	5	11	27	28	−1	35	1.35	
6	Atlético Bembibre	26	6	8	12	19	29	−10	26	1.00	

Source: Futbolme.com
Rules for classification: 1) points per game; per RFEF: 2) points; 3) head-to-head points; 4) head-to-head goal difference; 5) goal difference; 6) number of goals scored

==== Group 9 ====
Pos	Team	Pld	W	D	L	GF	GA	GD	Pts	PPG	Qualification
1	Atlético Malagueño	24	12	5	7	40	23	+17	41	1.71	Qualification for promotion play-offs
2	Juventud Torremolinos	24	10	9	5	33	23	+10	39	1.63	Qualification for promotion play-offs
3	Torreperogil	26	8	10	8	19	22	−3	34	1.31	
4	Alhaurín de la Torre	24	8	7	9	27	33	−6	31	1.29	
5	Huétor Tájar	26	7	12	7	35	36	−1	33	1.27	
6	Huétor Vega	26	7	7	12	30	43	−13	28	1.08	

Source: Futbolme.com
Rules for classification: 1) points per game; per RFEF: 2) points; 3) head-to-head points; 4) head-to-head goal difference; 5) goal difference; 6) number of goals scored

==== Group 10 ====
Pos	Team	Pld	W	D	L	GF	GA	GD	Pts	PPG	Qualification
1	Córdoba B (Note: Since Córdoba's first team qualified for the Segunda División RFEF next season, the second team vacated its play-off qualification.)	26	13	6	7	54	33	+21	45	1.73	Ineligible for promotion
2	Utrera	26	13	5	8	38	29	+9	44	1.69	Qualification for promotion play-offs
3	Pozoblanco	26	10	7	9	35	34	+1	37	1.42	Qualification for promotion play-offs
4	Rota	24	8	5	11	22	33	−11	29	1.21	
5	Los Barrios	24	8	3	13	25	38	−13	27	1.13	
6	Atlético Antoniano	24	4	11	9	23	35	−12	23	0.96	

Source: Futbolme.com
Rules for classification: 1) points per game; per RFEF: 2) points; 3) head-to-head points; 4) head-to-head goal difference; 5) goal difference; 6) number of goals scored

==== Group 11 ====
Pos	Team	Pld	W	D	L	GF	GA	GD	Pts	Qualification
1	Mallorca B	26	15	6	5	50	18	+32	51	Qualification for promotion play-offs
2	Santanyí	26	15	3	8	30	16	+14	48	Qualification for promotion play-offs
3	Manacor	26	13	8	5	38	26	+12	47	
4	Collerense	26	9	6	11	33	39	−6	33	
5	Portmany	26	9	5	12	35	38	−3	32	
6	Sant Rafel	26	6	9	11	34	35	−1	27	

Source: Futbolme.com
Rules for classification: 1) points; 2) head-to-head points; 3) head-to-head goal difference; 4) goal difference; 5) number of goals scored

==== Group 12 ====
Pos	Team	Pld	W	D	L	GF	GA	GD	Pts	PPG	Qualification
1	Buzanada	26	14	6	6	41	26	+15	48	1.85	Qualification for promotion play-offs
2	Tenerife B	26	13	6	7	43	28	+15	45	1.73	Qualification for promotion play-offs
3	Santa Úrsula	26	10	9	7	32	24	+8	39	1.50	Qualification for promotion play-offs
4	Gran Tarajal	24	8	10	6	23	21	+2	34	1.42	
5	Lanzarote	24	8	5	11	22	23	−1	29 (Note: Lanzarote finished ahead of Unión Viera on goal difference.)	1.21	
6	Unión Viera	24	8	2	14	29	47	−18	26	1.08	

Source: Futbolme.com
Rules for classification: 1) points per game; per RFEF: 2) points; 3) head-to-head points; 4) head-to-head goal difference; 5) goal difference; 6) number of goals scored

==== Group 13 ====
Pos	Team	Pld	W	D	L	GF	GA	GD	Pts	Qualification
1	La Unión Atlético	26	12	8	6	39	23	+16	44	Qualification for promotion play-offs
2	Cartagena FC	26	11	7	8	37	37	0	40	Qualification for promotion play-offs
3	Los Garres	26	10	8	8	30	27	+3	38 (Note: Los Garres finished ahead of UCAM Murcia B on head-to-head points: Los Garres-UCAM Murcia B 3–3, UCAM Murcia B-Los Garres 1–2.)	Qualification for promotion play-offs
4	UCAM Murcia B	26	10	8	8	41	27	+14	38	
5	Bullense	26	9	8	9	30	35	−5	35	
6	Mazarrón	26	8	5	13	28	32	−4	29	

Source: Futbolme.com
Rules for classification: 1) points; 2) head-to-head points; 3) head-to-head goal difference; 4) goal difference; 5) number of goals scored

==== Group 14 ====
Pos	Team	Pld	W	D	L	GF	GA	GD	Pts	Qualification
1	Plasencia	26	11	10	5	36	22	+14	43	Qualification for promotion play-offs
2	Miajadas	26	10	9	7	29	22	+7	39	Qualification for promotion play-offs
3	Extremadura B	26	10	8	8	33	23	+10	38	
4	Arroyo	26	10	5	11	22	29	−7	35	
5	Aceuchal	26	8	7	11	23	30	−7	31	
6	Azuaga	26	5	11	10	22	32	−10	26	

Source: Futbolme.com
Rules for classification: 1) points; 2) head-to-head points; 3) head-to-head goal difference; 4) goal difference; 5) number of goals scored

==== Group 15 ====
Pos	Team	Pld	W	D	L	GF	GA	GD	Pts	Qualification
1	Pamplona	26	12	7	7	39	25	+14	43	Qualification for promotion play-offs
2	Huarte	26	10	11	5	42	32	+10	41	Qualification for promotion play-offs
3	Cantolagua	26	8	11	7	36	31	+5	35	
4	Burladés	26	8	9	9	29	36	−7	33 (Note: Burladés finished ahead of Cortes on goal difference.)	
5	Cortes	26	8	9	9	22	30	−8	33	
6	Murchante	26	7	10	9	29	29	0	31	

Source: Futbolme.com
Rules for classification: 1) points; 2) head-to-head points; 3) head-to-head goal difference; 4) goal difference; 5) number of goals scored

==== Group 16 ====
Pos	Team	Pld	W	D	L	GF	GA	GD	Pts	Qualification
1	Calahorra B	26	15	8	3	44	19	+25	53	Qualification for promotion play-offs
2	Arnedo	26	14	4	8	42	25	+17	46	Qualification for promotion play-offs
3	Yagüe	26	12	6	8	43	27	+16	42	
4	Casalarreina	26	11	3	12	35	37	−2	36	
5	Oyonesa	26	8	4	14	29	34	−5	28 (Note: Oyonesa finished ahead of La Calzada on head-to-head points: Oyonesa-La Calzada B 3–0, La Calzada-Oyonesa 2–0.)	
6	La Calzada	26	8	4	14	34	41	−7	28	

Source: Futbolme.com
Rules for classification: 1) points; 2) head-to-head points; 3) head-to-head goal difference; 4) goal difference; 5) number of goals scored

==== Group 17 ====
Pos	Team	Pld	W	D	L	GF	GA	GD	Pts	Qualification
1	Barbastro	28	12	11	5	34	21	+13	47	Qualification for promotion play-offs
2	Binéfar	28	11	11	6	36	20	+16	44	Qualification for promotion play-offs
3	Deportivo Aragón	28	10	13	5	36	16	+20	43	
4	Illueca	28	11	7	10	30	28	+2	40	
5	Borja	28	9	9	10	34	30	+4	36	
6	Calamocha	28	8	11	9	29	28	+1	35	

Source: Futbolme.com
Rules for classification: 1) points; 2) head-to-head points; 3) head-to-head goal difference; 4) goal difference; 5) number of goals scored

==== Group 18 ====
Pos	Team	Pld	W	D	L	GF	GA	GD	Pts	Qualification
1	Guadalajara	26	12	6	8	36	27	+9	42	Qualification for promotion play-offs
2	Tarancón	26	11	5	10	29	22	+7	38	Qualification for promotion play-offs
3	Manchego	26	9	10	7	29	21	+8	37 (Note: Manchego finished ahead of Villacañas on head-to-head points: Villacañas-Manchego 1–2, Manchego-Villcañas 6–0.)	
4	Villacañas	26	10	7	9	25	28	−3	37	
5	La Roda	26	9	6	11	20	28	−8	33 (Note: La Roda finished ahead of Huracán Balazote on head-to-head points: Huracán Balazote-La Roda 0–0, La Roda-Huracán Balazote 1–0.)	
6	Huracán Balazote	26	9	6	11	31	37	−6	33	

Source: Futbolme.com
Rules for classification: 1) points; 2) head-to-head points; 3) head-to-head goal difference; 4) goal difference; 5) number of goals scored

=== Relegation groups ===
==== Group 1 ====
Pos	Team	Pld	W	D	L	GF	GA	GD	Pts	Relegation
1	Arzúa	34	13	11	10	49	33	+16	50 (Note: Arzúa finished ahead of Viveiro on goal difference.)	
2	Viveiro	34	14	8	12	43	55	−12	50	
3	Ourense CF	34	14	7	13	57	44	+13	49 (Note: Ourense CF finished ahead of Barco on goal difference.)	
4	Barco	34	13	10	11	47	42	+5	49	
5	UD Ourense (R)	34	13	7	14	45	48	−3	46	Relegation to Preferente Autonómica
6	Ribadumia (R)	34	13	6	15	42	50	−8	45	Relegation to Preferente Autonómica
7	Estudiantil (R)	34	9	9	16	45	66	−21	36	Relegation to Preferente Autonómica
8	Fisterra (R)	34	9	6	19	37	54	−17	33	Relegation to Preferente Autonómica
9	Atios (R)	34	7	10	17	29	53	−24	31	Relegation to Preferente Autonómica
10	Paiosaco (R)	34	6	10	18	31	62	−31	28	Relegation to Preferente Autonómica
11	As Pontes (R)	34	5	12	17	34	59	−25	27	Relegation to Preferente Autonómica
12	Pontellas (R)	34	4	8	22	26	56	−30	20	Relegation to Preferente Autonómica

Source: Futbolme.com
Rules for classification: 1) points; 2) head-to-head points; 3) head-to-head goal difference; 4) goal difference; 5) number of goals scored
(R) Relegated

==== Group 2 ====
Pos	Team	Pld	W	D	L	GF	GA	GD	Pts	Relegation
1	Praviano	28	12	6	10	37	34	+3	42	
2	Mosconia	28	11	6	11	29	32	−3	39	
3	Navarro	28	10	8	10	31	31	0	38	
4	Colunga	28	9	8	11	20	25	−5	35	
5	Condal (R)	28	6	13	9	22	30	−8	31	Relegation to Regional Preferente
6	Vallobín (R)	28	9	3	16	24	42	−18	30	Relegation to Regional Preferente
7	Avilés Stadium (R)	28	7	7	14	23	38	−15	28	Relegation to Regional Preferente
8	Siero (R)	28	5	4	19	21	44	−23	19	Relegation to Regional Preferente
9	Valdesoto (R)	28	3	3	22	13	48	−35	12	Relegation to Regional Preferente

Source: Futbolme.com
Rules for classification: 1) points; 2) head-to-head points; 3) head-to-head goal difference; 4) goal difference; 5) number of goals scored
(R) Relegated

==== Group 3 ====
Pos	Team	Pld	W	D	L	GF	GA	GD	Pts	Relegation
1	Guarnizo	30	12	9	9	42	35	+7	45	
2	Castro	30	13	5	12	39	37	+2	44	
3	Torina	30	10	6	14	38	46	−8	36 (Note: Torina finished ahead of Barreda on head-to-head points in the first phase: Torina-Barreda 4–1, Barreda-Torina 1–1.)	
4	Barreda	30	10	6	14	32	42	−10	36	
5	Solares-Medio Cudeyo (R)	30	7	10	13	27	30	−3	31 (Note: Solares-Medio Cudeyo finished ahead of Barquereño on head-to-head points: Solares-Barquereño 1–0, Barquereño-Solares 1–1.)	Relegation to Regional Preferente
6	Barquereño (R)	30	9	4	17	32	47	−15	31	Relegation to Regional Preferente
7	Bezana (R)	30	8	6	16	26	49	−23	30	Relegation to Regional Preferente
8	Revilla (R)	30	5	7	18	30	62	−32	22	Relegation to Regional Preferente
9	Rinconeda Polanco (R)	30	5	6	19	25	62	−37	21	Relegation to Regional Preferente
10	Ribamontán (R)	30	4	6	20	19	52	−33	18	Relegation to Regional Preferente

Source: Futbolme.com
Rules for classification: 1) points; 2) head-to-head points; 3) head-to-head goal difference; 4) goal difference; 5) number of goals scored
(R) Relegated

==== Group 4 ====
Pos	Team	Pld	W	D	L	GF	GA	GD	Pts	Relegation
1	Cultural Durango	30	9	12	9	28	25	+3	39 (Note: Cultural Durango finished ahead of Lagun Onak on goal difference.)	
2	Lagun Onak	30	11	6	13	37	40	−3	39	
3	Tolosa	30	10	8	12	35	40	−5	38 (Note: Tolosa finished ahead of Aurrerá Ondarroa on goal difference in the first phase.)	
4	Aurrerá Ondarroa	30	10	8	12	38	40	−2	38	
5	Santurtzi (R)	30	9	10	11	33	39	−6	37	Relegation to regional leagues
6	Balmaseda (R)	30	8	12	10	36	38	−2	36	Relegation to regional leagues
7	Somorrostro (R)	30	7	9	14	35	43	−8	30 (Note: Somorrostro finished ahead of Sodupe on head-to-head points: Somorrostro-Sodupe 2–2, Sodupe-Somorrostro 1–3.)	Relegation to regional leagues
8	Sodupe (R)	30	7	9	14	35	41	−6	30	Relegation to regional leagues
9	Ariznabarra (R)	30	5	9	16	27	47	−20	24	Relegation to regional leagues
10	Urgatzi (R)	30	3	2	25	16	91	−75	11	Relegation to regional leagues

Source: Futbolme.com
Rules for classification: 1) points; 2) head-to-head points; 3) head-to-head goal difference; 4) goal difference; 5) number of goals scored
(R) Relegated

==== Group 5 ====
Pos	Team	Pld	W	D	L	GF	GA	GD	Pts	Relegation
1	Pobla Mafumet	30	12	9	9	46	37	+9	45	
2	Peralada	30	11	9	10	31	30	+1	42	
3	Sants	30	12	5	13	33	35	−2	41 (Note: Sants finished ahead of Figueres on goal difference.)	
4	Figueres	30	11	8	11	33	38	−5	41	
5	Banyoles (R)	30	9	6	15	29	32	−3	33	Relegation to Primera Catalana
6	Santfeliuenc (R)	30	8	7	15	26	39	−13	31	Relegation to Primera Catalana
7	Valls (R)	30	7	9	14	22	34	−12	30	Relegation to Primera Catalana
8	Horta (R)	30	6	10	14	36	46	−10	28	Relegation to Primera Catalana
9	Igualada (R)	30	6	6	18	27	50	−23	24	Relegation to Primera Catalana
10	Montañesa (Note: Figueres was awarded a 0–3 win over Montañesa in their Round 9 match after the latter fielded an ineligible player. The match originally ended 1–1.) (R)	30	2	9	19	14	51	−37	15	Relegation to Primera Catalana

Source: Futbolme.com
Rules for classification: 1) points; 2) head-to-head points; 3) head-to-head goal difference; 4) goal difference; 5) number of goals scored
(R) Relegated

==== Group 6 ====
Pos	Team	Pld	W	D	L	GF	GA	GD	Pts	Relegation
1	Hércules B	28	10	8	10	25	23	+2	38	
2	Acero	28	7	12	9	29	33	−4	33 (Note: Acero finished ahead of Villajoyosa on head-to-head points: Acero-Villajoyosa 1–0, Villajoyosa-Acero 0–0. Villajoyosa finished ahead of Torrent also on head-to-head points: Villajoyosa-Torrent 2–2, Torrent-Villajoyosa 0–1.)	
3	Villajoyosa	28	8	9	11	28	36	−8	33	
4	Torrent	28	7	12	9	29	35	−6	33	
5	Paterna (R)	28	7	11	10	26	32	−6	32	Relegation to Regional Preferente
6	Crevillente (R)	28	8	7	13	28	36	−8	31	Relegation to Regional Preferente
7	Benicarló (R)	28	5	13	10	25	28	−3	28	Relegation to Regional Preferente
8	Novelda (R)	28	6	6	16	29	43	−14	24	Relegation to Regional Preferente
9	Vilamarxant (R)	28	4	8	16	18	46	−28	20	Relegation to Regional Preferente

Source: Futbolme.com
Rules for classification: 1) points; 2) head-to-head points; 3) head-to-head goal difference; 4) goal difference; 5) number of goals scored
(R) Relegated

==== Group 7 ====
Pos	Team	Pld	W	D	L	GF	GA	GD	Pts	Relegation
1	RSD Alcalá	32	14	10	8	38	25	+13	52	
2	Paracuellos Antamira	32	13	9	10	39	38	+1	48	
3	Villanueva del Pardillo	32	14	5	13	37	31	+6	47	
4	Complutense	32	12	9	11	28	32	−4	45	
5	Atlético Pinto (R)	32	12	7	13	33	42	−9	43	Relegation to Preferente
6	El Álamo (R)	32	9	8	15	42	47	−5	35 (Note: El Álamo finished ahead of San Fernando de Henares on goal difference.)	Relegation to Preferente
7	San Fernando de Henares (R)	32	9	8	15	32	44	−12	35	Relegation to Preferente
8	Móstoles CF (R)	32	7	6	19	23	45	−22	27	Relegation to Preferente
9	Real Aranjuez (R)	32	6	6	20	32	54	−22	24	Relegation to Preferente
10	Villaverde San Andrés (R)	32	6	5	21	27	53	−26	23	Relegation to Preferente
11	Santa Ana (R)	32	4	4	24	20	71	−51	16	Relegation to Preferente

Source: BeSoccer
Rules for classification: 1) points; 2) head-to-head points; 3) head-to-head goal difference; 4) goal difference; 5) number of goals scored
(R) Relegated

==== Group 8 ====
Pos	Team	Pld	W	D	L	GF	GA	GD	Pts	Relegation
1	Almazán	32	14	7	11	44	40	+4	49	
2	Salamanca B	32	11	12	9	34	32	+2	45	
3	Colegios Diocesanos	32	12	3	17	31	50	−19	39 (Note: Colegios Diocesanos finished ahead of Santa Marta on head-to-head points: Santa Marta-Colegios Diocesanos 1–0, Colegios Diocesanos-Santa Marta 2–0.)	
4	Santa Marta	32	10	9	13	23	28	−5	39	
5	La Bañeza (R)	32	9	9	14	32	41	−9	36	Relegation to Primera Regional
6	Cebrereña (R)	32	9	7	16	30	47	−17	34 (Note: Cebrereña finished ahead of Becerril on head-to-head points: Cebrereña-Becerril 1-1, Becerril-Cebrereña 0–1. Bupolsa finished ahead of Becerril also on head-to-head points: Becerril-Bupolsa 0–0, Bupolsa-Becerril 1–0.)	Relegation to Primera Regional
7	Bupolsa (R)	32	9	7	16	23	39	−16	34	Relegation to Primera Regional
8	Becerril (R)	32	8	10	14	21	31	−10	34	Relegation to Primera Regional
9	La Granja (R)	32	8	9	15	32	38	−6	33	Relegation to Primera Regional
10	Peñaranda (R)	32	8	7	17	29	48	−19	31	Relegation to Primera Regional
11	Real Burgos (R)	32	5	7	20	25	59	−34	22	Relegation to Primera Regional

Source: BeSoccer
Rules for classification: 1) points per game; per RFEF: 2) points; 3) head-to-head points; 4) head-to-head goal difference; 5) goal difference; 6) number of goals scored
(R) Relegated

==== Group 9 ====
Pos	Team	Pld	W	D	L	GF	GA	GD	Pts	Relegation
1	Jaén	28	13	5	10	36	30	+6	44	
2	Alhaurino	28	9	7	12	34	39	−5	34 (Note: Alhaurino finished ahead of Motril on head-to-head points in the first phase: Alhaurino-Motril 2–1, Motril-Alhuarino 1–2.)	
3	Motril	28	9	7	12	34	39	−5	34	
4	Atlético Porcuna	28	6	15	7	34	31	+3	33	
5	Polideportivo Almería (R)	28	8	7	13	22	35	−13	31	Relegation to División de Honor
6	Maracena (R)	28	7	9	12	33	41	−8	30 (Note: Maracena finished ahead of Estepona on head-to-head goal difference: Maracena-Estepona 2–0, Estepona-Maracena 1–0. Estepona finished ahead of Melilla CD on head-to-head points in the first phase: Melilla-Estepona 0–1, Estepona-Melilla 2–2.)	Relegation to División de Honor
7	Estepona (R)	28	8	6	14	27	40	−13	30	Relegation to División de Honor
8	Melilla CD (R)	28	8	6	14	28	43	−15	30	Relegation to División de Honor
9	Loja (Note: Estepona was awarded a 3–0 win over Loja in their Round 8 match after the latter fielded an ineligible player. The match originally ended 1–3.) (R)	28	8	5	15	23	43	−20	29	Relegation to División de Honor

Source: Futbolme.com
Rules for classification: 1) points; 2) head-to-head points; 3) head-to-head goal difference; 4) goal difference; 5) number of goals scored
(R) Relegated

==== Group 10 ====
Pos	Team	Pld	W	D	L	GF	GA	GD	Pts	Relegation
1	Sevilla C	28	10	8	10	25	28	−3	38	
2	Gerena	28	8	10	10	32	32	0	34 (Note: Gerena finished ahead of Conil on head-to-head goal difference: Gerena +1, Conil –1.)	
3	Conil	28	7	13	8	29	31	−2	34	
4	Cabecense	28	7	12	9	25	32	−7	33	
5	Castilleja (R)	28	8	8	12	31	32	−1	32 (Note: Castilleja finished ahead of Coria on head-to-head points in the first phase: Coria-Castilleja 0–4, Castilleja-Coria 1–0.)	Relegation to División de Honor
6	Coria (R)	28	8	8	12	26	33	−7	32	Relegation to División de Honor
7	La Palma (R)	28	6	9	13	25	33	−8	27	Relegation to División de Honor
8	Arcos (R)	28	5	11	12	18	31	−13	26	Relegation to División de Honor
9	Lebrijana (R)	28	4	6	18	18	43	−25	18	Relegation to División de Honor

Source: Futbolme.com
Rules for classification: 1) points; 2) head-to-head points; 3) head-to-head goal difference; 4) goal difference; 5) number of goals scored
(R) Relegated

==== Group 11 ====
Pos	Team	Pld	W	D	L	GF	GA	GD	Pts	Relegation
1	Sóller	30	12	7	11	37	41	−4	43	
2	Llosetense	30	11	5	14	32	44	−12	38 (Note: Llosetense finished ahead of Binissalem on head-to-head points in the first phase: Binissalem-Llosetense 0–1, Llosetense-Binissalem 0–0. Binissalem finished ahead of Felanitx also on head-to-head points: Felanitx-Binissalem 0–1, Binissalem-Felanitx 1–0.)	
3	Binissalem	30	9	11	10	28	29	−1	38	
4	Felanitx	30	11	5	14	44	38	+6	38	
5	Alcúdia (R)	30	9	10	11	30	42	−12	37 (Note: Alcudia finished ahead of Cardassar on head-to-head points: Cardassar-Alcudia 2–2, Alcudia–Cardassar 2–1.)	Relegation to Primera Regional Preferente
6	Cardassar (R)	30	9	10	11	36	41	−5	37	Relegation to Primera Regional Preferente
7	Santa Catalina Atlético (R)	30	6	7	17	27	50	−23	25	Relegation to Primera Regional Preferente
8	Ferriolense (R)	30	6	5	19	29	50	−21	23	Relegation to Primera Regional Preferente
9	Génova (R)	30	4	9	17	32	59	−27	21	Relegation to Primera Regional Preferente
10	Esporles (R)	30	1	6	23	21	74	−53	9	Relegation to Primera Regional Preferente

Source: BeSoccer
Rules for classification: 1) points; 2) head-to-head points; 3) head-to-head goal difference; 4) goal difference; 5) number of goals scored
(R) Relegated

==== Group 12 ====
Pos	Team	Pld	W	D	L	GF	GA	GD	Pts	Relegation
1	La Cuadra	28	14	3	11	40	43	−3	45	
2	Vera	28	11	9	8	36	28	+8	42	
3	Arucas	28	12	5	11	46	35	+11	41	
4	Villa de Santa Brígida	28	11	6	11	34	27	+7	39	
5	Guía (R)	28	10	5	13	35	47	−12	35	Relegation to Interinsular Preferente
6	Atlético Tacoronte (R)	28	10	4	14	30	39	−9	34	Relegation to Interinsular Preferente
7	Atlético Victoria (R)	28	7	6	15	25	48	−23	27	Relegation to Interinsular Preferente
8	Güímar (R)	28	2	8	18	25	58	−33	14 (Note: Güímar finished ahead of Ibarra on head-to-head points in the first phase: Güímar-Ibarra 1–0, Ibarra-Güímar 0–0.)	Relegation to Interinsular Preferente
9	Ibarra (R)	28	3	5	20	20	50	−30	14	Relegation to Interinsular Preferente

Source: Futbolme.com
Rules for classification: 1) points; 2) head-to-head points; 3) head-to-head goal difference; 4) goal difference; 5) number of goals scored
(R) Relegated

==== Group 13 ====
Pos	Team	Pld	W	D	L	GF	GA	GD	Pts	Relegation
1	Deportiva Minera	30	10	11	9	36	32	+4	41	
2	Ciudad de Murcia	30	9	12	9	24	24	0	39 (Note: Ciudad de Murcia finished ahead of El Palmar on head-to-head points: Ciudad-El Palmar 1–0, El Palmar-Ciudad 2–2. El Palmar finished ahead of Huércal-Overa also on head-to-head points: El Palmar-El Castillo 2–0, El Castillo-El Palmar 0–0.)	
3	El Palmar	30	9	12	9	45	34	+11	39	
4	Huércal-Overa (El Castillo)	30	11	6	13	29	38	−9	39	
5	Olímpico Totana (R)	30	9	7	14	31	35	−4	34 (Note: Olímpico Totana finished ahead of Churra on head-to-head points in the first phase: Churra-Olímpico 0–1, Olímpico-Churra 1–0.)	Relegation to Preferente Autonómica
6	Churra (R)	30	9	7	14	29	43	−14	34	Relegation to Preferente Autonómica
7	Minerva (Note: Minerva was deducted three points for irregularities in the postponement of the match (failed to adhere to COVID-19 protocols) against Ciudad de Murcia in their Round 6 match. The game ended 1–0 for Ciudad de Murcia.) (R)	30	10	6	14	35	51	−16	33	Relegation to Preferente Autonómica
8	Plus Ultra (R)	30	6	5	19	22	65	−43	23	Relegation to Preferente Autonómica
9	Muleño (R)	30	4	7	19	24	49	−25	19	Relegation to Preferente Autonómica
10	Lorca FC (R)	30	1	4	25	15	77	−62	7	Relegation to Preferente Autonómica

Source: Futbolme.com
Rules for classification: 1) points; 2) head-to-head points; 3) head-to-head goal difference; 4) goal difference; 5) number of goals scored
(R) Relegated

==== Group 14 ====
Pos	Team	Pld	W	D	L	GF	GA	GD	Pts	Relegation
1	Olivenza	30	9	11	10	39	33	+6	38	
2	Trujillo	30	9	10	11	42	35	+7	37	
3	Calamonte	30	8	12	10	34	37	−3	36	
4	Llerenense	30	8	11	11	32	42	−10	35	
5	Racing Valverdeño (R)	30	9	7	14	28	43	−15	34	Relegation to Regional Preferente
6	Campanario (R)	30	9	4	17	24	49	−25	31	Relegation to Regional Preferente
7	Fuente de Cantos (R)	30	8	4	18	29	47	−18	28	Relegation to Regional Preferente
8	Chinato (R)	30	7	5	18	31	48	−17	26	Relegation to Regional Preferente
9	Lobón (R)	30	5	10	15	20	48	−28	25	Relegation to Regional Preferente
10	Valdivia (R)	30	5	5	20	26	66	−40	20	Relegation to Regional Preferente

Source: Futbolme.com
Rules for classification: 1) points; 2) head-to-head points; 3) head-to-head goal difference; 4) goal difference; 5) number of goals scored
(R) Relegated

==== Group 15 ====
Pos	Team	Pld	W	D	L	GF	GA	GD	Pts	Relegation
1	Beti Onak	30	12	12	6	55	35	+20	48	
2	Txantrea	30	12	8	10	50	39	+11	44 (Note: Txantrea finished ahead of Subiza on goal difference.)	
3	Subiza	30	11	11	8	43	36	+7	44	
4	Corellano	30	11	8	11	48	48	0	41	
5	Peña Azagresa (R)	30	11	5	14	41	53	−12	38	Relegation to Regional Preferente
6	Bidezarra (R)	30	10	5	15	36	37	−1	35	Relegation to Regional Preferente
7	Baztan (R)	30	6	13	11	27	44	−17	31	Relegation to Regional Preferente
8	River Ega (R)	30	7	6	17	42	60	−18	27	Relegation to Regional Preferente
9	Lourdes (R)	30	5	7	18	32	55	−23	22	Relegation to Regional Preferente
10	Fontellas (R)	30	6	2	22	25	74	−49	20	Relegation to Regional Preferente

Source: BeSoccer
Rules for classification: 1) points; 2) head-to-head points; 3) head-to-head goal difference; 4) goal difference; 5) number of goals scored
(R) Relegated

==== Group 16 ====
Pos	Team	Pld	W	D	L	GF	GA	GD	Pts	Relegation
1	River Ebro	30	12	8	10	36	36	0	44	
2	Atlético Vianés	30	10	11	9	38	33	+5	41 (Note: Atlético Vianés finished ahead of Berceo on goal difference.)	
3	Berceo	30	12	5	13	42	48	−6	41	
4	Agoncillo	30	10	8	12	42	45	−3	38	
5	Tedeón (R)	30	10	7	13	30	45	−15	37	Relegation to Regional Preferente
6	Pradejón (R)	30	8	10	12	43	50	−7	34	Relegation to Regional Preferente
7	Comillas (R)	30	9	5	16	37	50	−13	32	Relegation to Regional Preferente
8	Calasancio (Note: Agoncillo was awarded a 0–3 win over Calasancio in their Round 10 match after the latter fielded an ineligible player. The match originally ended 1–1.) (R)	30	6	5	19	20	62	−42	23	Relegation to Regional Preferente
9	Alberite (R)	30	4	8	18	23	53	−30	20	Relegation to Regional Preferente
10	Villegas (R)	30	1	2	27	13	90	−77	5	Relegation to Regional Preferente

Source: Futbolme.com
Rules for classification: 1) points; 2) head-to-head points; 3) head-to-head goal difference; 4) goal difference; 5) number of goals scored
(R) Relegated

==== Group 17 ====
Pos	Team	Pld	W	D	L	GF	GA	GD	Pts	Relegation
1	Épila	34	13	14	7	45	32	+13	53 (Note: Épila finished ahead of Robres on goal difference.)	
2	Robres	34	14	11	9	48	40	+8	53	
3	Atlético Monzón	34	13	13	8	43	29	+14	52	
4	Cariñena	34	13	10	11	46	40	+6	49	
5	Sariñena (R)	34	13	9	12	54	44	+10	48	Relegation to Regional Preferente
6	Almudévar (R)	34	9	13	12	40	51	−11	40	Relegation to Regional Preferente
7	Fraga (R)	34	9	12	13	33	34	−1	39	Relegation to Regional Preferente
8	Tamarite (R)	34	8	11	15	35	51	−16	35	Relegation to Regional Preferente
9	Valdefierro (R)	34	9	6	19	33	59	−26	33 (Note: Valdefierro finished ahead of Villanueva on head-to-head points: Villanueva-Valdefierro 2–2, Valdefierro-Villanueva 3–2.)	Relegation to Regional Preferente
10	Villanueva (R)	34	8	9	17	35	60	−25	33	Relegation to Regional Preferente
11	Sabiñánigo (R)	34	6	7	21	38	58	−20	25	Relegation to Regional Preferente
12	San Juan (Note: San Juan was excluded from the competition in the first phase and thus relegated. All second phase opponents were awarded 3–0 wins.) (D, R)	34	0	0	34	0	102	−102	0	Relegation to Regional Preferente

Source: Futbolme.com
Rules for classification: 1) points; 2) head-to-head points; 3) head-to-head goal difference; 4) goal difference; 5) number of goals scored
(D) Disqualified; (R) Relegated

==== Group 18 ====
Pos	Team	Pld	W	D	L	GF	GA	GD	Pts	Relegation
1	Azuqueca	30	15	4	11	46	35	+11	49	
2	Illescas	30	11	8	11	30	33	−3	41	
3	Almansa	30	11	6	13	34	39	−5	39	
4	Conquense	30	10	8	12	32	34	−2	38	
5	La Solana (R)	30	9	8	13	27	36	−9	35	Relegation to Primera Autonómica Preferente
6	Pedroñeras (R)	30	9	7	14	27	39	−12	34	Relegation to Primera Autonómica Preferente
7	Atlético Ibañés (R)	30	6	14	10	27	39	−12	32	Relegation to Primera Autonómica Preferente
8	Almagro (R)	30	7	4	19	29	53	−24	25	Relegation to Primera Autonómica Preferente
9	Madridejos (R)	30	6	5	19	27	52	−25	23	Relegation to Primera Autonómica Preferente
10	Manzanares (R)	30	5	7	18	23	52	−29	22	Relegation to Primera Autonómica Preferente

Source: Futbolme.com
Rules for classification: 1) points; 2) head-to-head points; 3) head-to-head goal difference; 4) goal difference; 5) number of goals scored
(R) Relegated
