= Ricardo Molina =

Spanish footballer and coach

Personal information
- Full name: Ricardo Molina Miras
- Date of birth: 31 January 1984 (age 42)
- Place of birth: Almería, Spain
- Height: 1.83 m (6 ft 0 in)
- Position: Goalkeeper

Team information
- Current team: Almería (goalkeeping coach)

Youth career
- Los Molinos

Senior career*
Years	Team	Apps	(Gls)
2002–2003	Los Molinos		
2003–2007	Almería B		
2004–2007	Almería	2	(0)
2007–2008	Alicante	3	(0)
2008–2011	Orihuela	80	(0)
2011–2012	Badalona	0	(0)
2012–2013	UCAM Murcia	19	(0)
2013–2014	Español Alquián	5	(0)
Total		109	(0)

Managerial career
- 2016–2018: Almería B (assistant)
- 2017: Almería B (interim)
- * Club domestic league appearances and goals

Ricardo Molina Miras (born 31 January 1984) is a Spanish retired footballer who played as a goalkeeper, and is the current goalkeeping coach of UD Almería.

== Playing career ==
Molina was born in Almería, Andalusia. He made his senior debuts for Los Molinos CF, and represented UD Almería's reserve team for several seasons in the Tercera División.

Molina played his first match as a professional on 13 March 2005, starting in a 0–3 away loss against Córdoba CF in the Segunda División. He only appeared in his second match for the main squad on 17 June 2007, being sent off in the fifth minute of a 3–0 home success against UD Vecindario.

On 25 July 2007 Molina moved to Alicante CF of the third-tier Segunda División B. He renewed his link on 28 June of the following year, as his side were promoted to the second division, but acted mainly as a backup to Jesús Unanua; he rescinded his link on 30 December 2008, and signed for Orihuela CF three days later.

On 12 July 2011 Molina joined third-tier club CF Badalona. A backup to longtime incumbent Marcos, he moved to another Segunda B team, UCAM Murcia CF, in June of the following year.

On 1 August 2013, free agent Molina moved to CD Español del Alquián of the fourth tier.

== Coaching career ==
Molina retired in 2014, and joined his first club Almería's B-team as a goalkeeping coach the following year. In 2016, he was appointed Fran Fernández's assistant while also keeping his previous role.
