= Dani Góngora =

Spanish footballer

Personal information
- Full name: Daniel Góngora Rodríguez
- Date of birth: 12 April 1994 (age 32)
- Place of birth: Almería, Spain
- Position: Winger

Youth career
- 2003–2007: Real Madrid
- 2007–2010: La Cañada
- 2010–2012: Sevilla
- 2012–2013: Granada

Senior career*
| Years | Team | Apps | (Gls) |
| 2013–2014 | SS Reyes | | |
| 2014–2015 | Los Molinos | 23 | (1) |
| 2015–2016 | Arenas | 12 | (1) |
| 2016 | Marino Luanco | 10 | (2) |
| 2016–2017 | Polvorín | 26 | (6) |
| 2017 | Lugo | 1 | (0) |
| 2017 | Jaén | 6 | (0) |
| 2018 | Caudal | 0 | (0) |
- * Club domestic league appearances and goals as of 1 November 2017

Daniel "Dani" Góngora Rodríguez (born 11 April 1994) is a Spanish professional footballer who plays as a right winger.

== Club career ==
Born in Almería, Andalusia, Góngora represented Real Madrid, UCD La Cañada Atlético, Sevilla FC and Granada CF as a youth. He made his senior debut in 2013 with UD San Sebastián de los Reyes in Tercera División, and continued to appear in the category in the following years, with Los Molinos CF and Marino de Luanco.

In 2016 Góngora joined CD Lugo, being initially assigned to the farm team also in the fourth tier. On 5 March 2017 he made his first team debut, coming on as a second-half substitute for Fede Vico in a 1–2 home loss against UD Almería in the Segunda División championship.
