= Holy Week in Santa Cruz de La Palma =

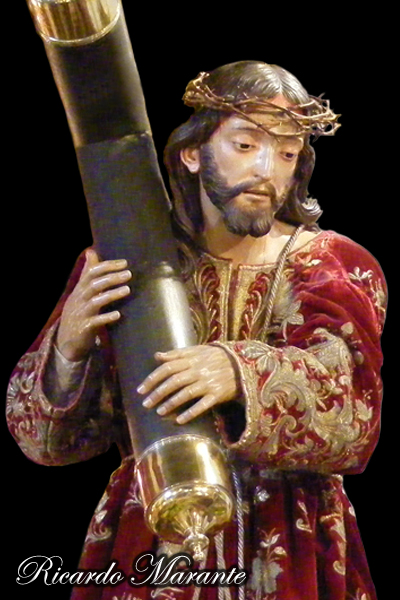
Jesus the Nazarene by the sculptor Fernando Estévez. Santa Cruz de La Palma.

Holy Week is commemorated each year in Santa Cruz de La Palma, Canary Islands, by processions marking the Passion, Death and Resurrection of Jesus Christ. It is one of the oldest festivities in the island of La Palma, and is the most significant public religious event that takes place in the city, except for the Lustral Festivity of the Bajada de la Virgen. In 2014 it was declared a Fiesta of Tourist Interest in the Canary Islands.

== Features ==
In addition to preserving some traditional rites, the event incorporates others of recent creation. It is noted for the rigorous chronology observed in all processions, in which the order narrated in the Bible is followed, and for the antiquity and variety of the musical genres that are performed during the processions. Another feature of interest is the quality of its sculpted imagery, with carvings from the ancient Spanish provinces of the Netherlands, colonial America, the eighteenth-century Sevillian school, nineteenth-century neoclassicism – with the presence of some of the best works by Canary Islands sculptor Fernando Estévez – and the most brilliant periods of local sculpture.

The urban setting of Santa Cruz de La Palma, through which most of the processions take place, was declared Conjunto histórico (Historic-Artistic Grouping) in 1975.

== See also ==
- Holy Week in San Cristóbal de La Laguna
- Holy Week in Spain
- Capirote

== Bibliography ==
- Escuela Insular de Música de La Palma (2001). Motetes de Semana Santa de Santa Cruz de La Palma (in Spanish). Cabildo Insular de La Palma. Depósito legal TF 235-2001.
- Poggio Capote, Manuel; Correa Hernández, Víctor J. (2007). Consummatum est: L aniversario de la fundación de la Cofradía del Santo Sepulcro (in Spanish). Cartas Diferentes Ediciones. ISBN 978-8469078815.
- Rodríguez-Lewis, Juan José (2005). Apuntes sobre la Semana Santa de Santa Cruz de La Palma (in Spanish). Santa Cruz de Tenerife: Mas Canarias. Depósito legal TF 370-2005.
- Rodríguez-Lewis, Juan José (2016). La Ciudad y la Pasión: la Semana Santa de Santa Cruz de La Palma durante los siglos XIX y XX (in Spanish). Cartas Diferentes Ediciones. ISBN 9788494357282.
