= Manu Palancar =

Spanish footballer

Personal information
- Full name: Manuel Palancar Belloso
- Date of birth: 1 January 1990 (age 36)
- Place of birth: Seville, Spain
- Height: 1.76 m (5 ft 9 in)
- Position: Defender

Team information
- Current team: Coria

Youth career
- Betis

Senior career*
Years	Team	Apps	(Gls)
2009–2010	Betis C		
2010–2013	Betis B	88	(0)
2011–2013	Betis	2	(0)
2013–2014	Linense	28	(0)
2015–	Coria	9	(1)
- * Club domestic league appearances and goals as of 29 March 2015

Manuel 'Manu' Palancar Belloso (born 1 January 1990) is a Spanish footballer who plays for Coria CF as a defender.

== Club career ==
Born in Seville, Andalusia, Palancar graduated from local Real Betis' youth system, making his senior debuts with the C-team in the 2009–10 season, also appearing with the reserves in Segunda División B. On 6 March 2011 he made his professional debut, playing the last 10 minutes in a 4–1 home win over UD Las Palmas.

On 11 May 2012 Palancar renewed his link with the Verdiblancos, penning until 2014. He would spend the rest of his spell with the B's, however.

On 11 August 2013 Palancar signed for Real Balompédica Linense in the third level. Roughly a year later he was released, and joined Tercera División side Coria CF on 30 January 2015.
