= Luis Arellano =

Venezuelan footballer (born 1989)

Personal information
- Full name: Luis Eduardo Arellano Moreno
- Date of birth: 4 January 1989 (age 37)
- Place of birth: Caracas, Venezuela
- Height: 1.82 m (5 ft 11 1/2 in)
- Position: Goalkeeper

Team information
- Current team: Tenisca

Youth career
- Tenisca

Senior career*
| Years | Team | Apps | (Gls) |
| 2007–2008 | Tenisca | | |
| 2008–2010 | Tenerife B | 11 | (0) |
| 2008 | Tenerife | 0 | (0) |
| 2010–2012 | Albacete B | 64 | (0) |
| 2010–2012 | Albacete | 0 | (0) |
| 2012–2014 | Mensajero | 64 | (0) |
| 2014–2015 | Atlético Astorga | 11 | (0) |
| 2015–2016 | La Roda | 27 | (0) |
| 2016–2017 | Badalona | 0 | (0) |
| 2017 | Las Zocas | | |
| 2017–2018 | Jaén | 2 | (0) |
| 2018–2019 | Socuéllamos | 36 | (0) |
| 2019–2023 | Atlético Paso | 86 | (0) |
| 2023– | Tenisca | | |
- * Club domestic league appearances and goals as of 14 May 2024

Luis Eduardo Arellano Moreno (born 4 January 1989) is a Venezuelan professional footballer who plays for Spanish club Tenisca as a goalkeeper.
