= 2013–14 Tercera División =

Tercera División
- Season: 2013–14

The 2013–14 Tercera División was the fourth tier of football in Spain. Play started in August 2013 and ended in June 2014 with the promotion play-off finals.

== Competition format ==
- The top four eligible teams in each group, played in the promotion playoffs.
- The champion of each group qualified to 2014–15 Copa del Rey. If the champion is a reserve team, the first non-reserve team qualified will join the Copa.
- In each group, at least three teams were relegated to Regional Divisions.

== League table ==
Key to colors in league table:
Group Winners Promotion playoffs
Promotion playoffs
Direct relegation

== Classification ==
=== Group I – Galicia ===
Location of teams of the 2013–14 Tercera División Group I

Pos	Team	Pld	W	D	L	GF	GA	GD	Pts
1	Somozas (P)	38	22	9	7	72	36	+36	75
2	Cerceda	38	21	11	6	61	27	+34	74
3	Boiro	38	19	17	2	66	37	+29	74
4	Pontevedra	38	22	7	9	47	27	+20	73
5	As Pontes	38	21	10	7	72	42	+30	73
6	Choco	38	19	8	11	67	51	+16	65
7	Arosa	38	16	11	11	48	39	+9	59
8	Órdenes	38	17	7	14	49	38	+11	58
9	Deportivo B	38	14	12	12	54	55	−1	54
10	Rápido de Bouzas	38	14	9	15	46	51	−5	51
11	Barbadás	38	12	15	11	43	43	0	51
12	Alondras	38	13	7	18	46	51	−5	46
13	Racing Villalbés	38	12	10	16	31	47	−16	46
14	Bertamiráns	38	10	12	16	34	45	−11	42
15	Laracha	38	9	10	19	31	54	−23	37
16	Cultural Areas	38	10	5	23	46	74	−28	35
17	Grixoa (R)	38	7	12	19	32	55	−23	33
18	Betanzos (R)	38	5	16	17	30	55	−25	31
19	Dorneda (R)	38	8	7	23	33	57	−24	31
20	Negreira (R)	38	8	7	23	36	60	−24	31

(P) Promoted; (R) Relegated

Top goalscorers

Goalscorers	Goals	Team
(Spain) Jorge Cano	24	Cerceda
(Spain) Luis Ángel Curra	21	Somozas
(Spain) Pablo Couñago	17	Choco
(Spain) Pablo Carnero	16	Pontevedra
(Spain) Yerai Couñago	13	Choco

Top goalkeeper

Goalkeeper	Goals	Matches	Average	Team
(Spain) Edu Sousa	22	33	0.67	Pontevedra

=== Group II – Asturias ===
The Group II is played by teams from Asturias. If there are promotions to Segunda División B there will be as many promotions from Regional Preferente as necessary to have 20 teams in the league. Also, if any of the Asturian teams from 2013–14 Segunda División B are relegated to Tercera, there will be the necessary additional relegations to remain 20 teams.

Teams from second qualified to the necessary to complete 12 teams with the ones of Segunda División B which did not qualify to Copa del Rey will join the Regional stage of the Copa Federación.

- New teams: Avilés B, Lenense, Andés (promoted from Regional Preferente)
- Teams which left the league: Llanes, Navia and Navarro (relegated to Regional Preferente)
Location of teams of the 2013–14 Tercera División Group II

Pos	Team	Pld	W	D	L	GF	GA	GD	Pts
1	Lealtad (P)	38	23	7	8	62	27	+35	76
2	Langreo (P)	38	23	7	8	62	28	+34	76
3	Ceares	38	21	11	6	54	31	+23	74
4	Praviano	38	21	9	8	57	36	+21	72
5	Covadonga	38	20	11	7	70	35	+35	71
6	Tuilla	38	19	7	12	67	38	+29	64
7	Universidad de Oviedo	38	19	7	12	52	30	+22	64
8	Cudillero	38	19	6	13	59	51	+8	63
9	L'Entregu	38	17	8	13	48	39	+9	59
10	Condal	38	14	13	11	47	34	+13	55
11	Avilés B	38	13	10	15	51	55	−4	49
12	Oviedo B	38	14	6	18	46	53	−7	48
13	Urraca	38	10	16	12	55	54	+1	46
14	Atlético de Lugones	38	12	10	16	49	55	−6	46
15	Lenense	38	10	8	20	29	54	−25	38
16	Gijón Industrial	38	9	9	20	21	50	−29	36
17	Andés	38	10	4	24	32	77	−45	34
18	Candás (R)	38	8	10	20	35	53	−18	34
19	Luarca (R)	38	6	10	22	23	66	−43	28
20	Tapia (R)	38	5	5	28	23	76	−53	20

Updated to match(es) played on 1 March 2014. Source: Royal Asturias Football Federation Official League Table
Rules for classification: 1) points; 2) goal difference; 3) number of goals scored.
(P) Promoted; (R) Relegated

Top goalscorers

Goalscorers	Goals	Team
(Spain) Chus Jiménez	25	Langreo
(Spain) Villa	21	Universidad de Oviedo
(Spain) Juan Sánchez	18	Atlético de Lugones
(Spain) Jorge Lombán	18	Lealtad
(Spain) Cristian García	17	Avilés B

Top goalkeeper

Goalkeeper	Goals	Matches	Average	Team
(Spain) Javi Porrón	19	30	0.63	Lealtad

=== Group III – Cantabria ===
Location of teams of the 2013–14 Tercera División Group III

Pos	Team	Pld	W	D	L	GF	GA	GD	Pts
1	Gimnástica	38	27	8	3	82	18	+64	89
2	Laredo	38	23	8	7	71	31	+40	77
3	Rayo Cantabria	38	21	9	8	60	37	+23	72
4	Escobedo	38	19	14	5	50	30	+20	71
5	Siete Villas	38	16	13	9	60	44	+16	61
6	Cayón	38	18	7	13	46	36	+10	61
7	Gama	38	16	10	12	44	34	+10	58
8	Racing B	38	14	12	12	52	39	+13	54
9	Atlético Albericia	38	15	9	14	38	44	−6	54
10	Buelna	38	14	11	13	46	46	0	53
11	Vimenor	38	11	18	9	49	48	+1	51
12	Bezana	38	13	11	14	49	54	−5	50
13	Colindres	38	12	10	16	43	59	−16	46
14	Castro	38	12	6	20	47	63	−16	42
15	Selaya	38	10	11	17	39	57	−18	41
16	Barreda	38	11	8	19	48	67	−19	41
17	Santoña	38	11	8	19	42	59	−17	41
18	Pontejos (R)	38	10	7	21	47	78	−31	37
19	Guarnizo (R)	38	6	5	27	42	78	−36	23
20	Ribamontán al Mar (R)	38	3	11	24	31	64	−33	20

(R) Relegated

Top goalscorer

Goalscorers	Goals	Team
(Spain) Jesús Espino	22	Siete Villas
(Spain) Marco Moreno	19	Escobedo
(Spain) Mario Sáiz	18	Bezana
(Spain) Álvaro Santamaría	18	Cayón
(Spain) José Antonio Antoñán	17	Buelna

Top goalkeeper

Goalkeeper	Goals	Matches	Average	Team
(Spain) Pablo Gómez	24	31	0.77	Escobedo

=== Group IV – Basque Country ===
Location of teams of the 2013–14 Tercera División Group IV

Pos	Team	Pld	W	D	L	GF	GA	GD	Pts
1	Leioa (P)	38	24	9	5	62	34	+28	81
2	Portugalete	38	20	10	8	67	38	+29	70
3	Arenas	38	20	9	9	67	39	+28	69
4	Baskonia	38	19	10	9	77	49	+28	67 (Note: Baskonia could not participate in the play-offs as they are Athletic's 2nd reserve team & Athletic B are in Segunda División B.)
5	Alavés B	38	17	11	10	54	33	+21	62
6	Zalla	38	16	12	10	55	45	+10	60
7	Gernika	38	15	14	9	43	29	+14	59
8	Zamudio	38	15	11	12	64	48	+16	56
9	Balmaseda	38	14	13	11	45	40	+5	55
10	Beasain	38	14	10	14	45	59	−14	52
11	Santutxu	38	9	21	8	37	40	−3	48
12	Durango	38	13	9	16	52	57	−5	48
13	Pasaia	38	12	10	16	39	48	−9	46
14	Lagun Onak	38	12	9	17	34	46	−12	45
15	Oiartzun	38	11	11	16	40	61	−21	44
16	Amurrio	38	11	9	18	31	45	−14	42
17	Bermeo	38	9	12	17	37	46	−9	39
18	Elgoibar (R)	38	7	14	17	26	48	−22	35
19	Retuerto Sport (R)	38	5	10	23	21	62	−41	25
20	Sodupe (R)	38	5	10	23	36	65	−29	25

(P) Promoted; (R) Relegated
Notes:

Top goalscorer

Goalscorers	Goals	Team
(Spain) Gorka Santamaría	20	Baskonia
(Spain) David Pereda	17	Zalla
(Spain) Andoitz Galdós	13	Zamudio
(Spain) Sergio García	13	Portugalete
(Spain) David Infante	13	Arenas

Top goalkeeper

Goalkeeper	Goals	Matches	Average	Team
(Spain) Oier San Miguel	25	34	0.74	Gernika

=== Group V – Catalonia ===
Location of teams of the 2013–14 Tercera División Group V

Pos	Team	Pld	W	D	L	GF	GA	GD	Pts
1	Cornellà (P)	38	22	7	9	58	40	+18	73
2	Montañesa	38	21	10	7	61	31	+30	73
3	Europa	38	20	9	9	52	29	+23	69
4	Terrassa Olímpica 2010	38	20	9	9	55	35	+20	69
5	Rubí	38	21	6	11	59	36	+23	69
6	Ascó	38	19	11	8	53	40	+13	68
7	Palamós	38	16	13	9	62	53	+9	61
8	Pobla de Mafumet	38	16	9	13	45	37	+8	57
9	Santfeliuenc	38	16	9	13	46	41	+5	57
10	Manlleu	38	13	11	14	39	39	0	50
11	Figueres	38	11	14	13	51	52	−1	47
12	Cerdanyola del Vallès	38	10	16	12	52	58	−6	46
13	Vilafranca	38	12	8	18	41	50	−9	44
14	Masnou	38	11	11	16	36	46	−10	44
15	Gavà	38	12	6	20	43	52	−9	42
16	Castelldefels	38	10	12	16	46	51	−5	42
17	Vilassar de Mar	38	11	9	18	35	49	−14	42
18	Santboià (R)	38	10	10	18	47	54	−7	40
19	Rapitenca (R)	38	7	10	21	31	67	−36	31
20	Gramenet Milán (R)	38	4	6	28	25	77	−52	18

Updated to match(es) played on 1 March 2014. Source: Catalan Football Federation Official League Table
Rules for classification: 1) points; 2) goal difference; 3) number of goals scored.
(P) Promoted; (R) Relegated

Top goalscorer

Goalscorers	Goals	Team
(Spain) Xavier Revert	21	Palamós
(Spain) Ernest Forgàs	21	Rubí
(Spain) Manel Sala	21	Manlleu
(Spain) Javi Sánchez	20	Europa
(Spain) Óscar Muñoz	15	Cornellà

Top goalkeeper

Goalkeeper	Goals	Matches	Average	Team
(Spain) Andrés Burgada	23	32	0.72	Montañesa

=== Group VI – Valencian Community ===
Location of teams of the 2013–14 Tercera División Group VI

Pos	Team	Pld	W	D	L	GF	GA	GD	Pts
1	Eldense (P)	38	21	8	9	61	34	+27	71
2	Alzira	38	18	11	9	60	33	+27	65
3	Orihuela	38	19	8	11	40	31	+9	65
4	Paterna	38	17	12	9	46	36	+10	63
5	Novelda	38	15	14	9	39	34	+5	59
6	Muro	38	15	13	10	44	34	+10	58
7	Cullera	38	14	15	9	46	37	+9	57
8	La Nucía	38	14	13	11	40	40	0	55
9	Acero	38	15	7	16	56	49	+7	52
10	Torrevieja	38	13	13	12	47	50	−3	52
11	Atlético Saguntino	38	12	15	11	31	28	+3	51
12	Jove Español	38	13	11	14	40	37	+3	50
13	Ribarroja	38	12	13	13	39	47	−8	49
14	Villarreal C	38	13	9	16	52	51	+1	48
15	Castellón	38	10	13	15	44	43	+1	43
16	Torre Levante	38	10	11	17	37	49	−12	41
17	Utiel	38	11	7	20	42	65	−23	40
18	Borriol (R)	38	8	13	17	29	43	−14	37
19	Llosa (R)	38	8	13	17	33	56	−23	37
20	Pinoso (R)	38	8	9	21	35	64	−29	33

(P) Promoted; (R) Relegated

Top goalscorer

Goalscorers	Goals	Team
(Spain) Alberto Bielsa	22	Acero
(Spain) Edu López	15	Cullera
(Spain) Marcos Campos	15	Eldense
(Spain) Rober Civera	11	Utiel
(Spain) Álex Torrella	11	Muro

Top goalkeeper

Goalkeeper	Goals	Matches	Average	Team
(Spain) Nico Bosch	21	28	0.75	Atlético Saguntino

=== Group VII – Community of Madrid ===
Location of teams of the 2013–14 Tercera División Group VII

Pos	Team	Pld	W	D	L	GF	GA	GD	Pts
1	Trival Valderas (P)	42	24	11	7	65	33	+32	83
2	Rayo Vallecano B (P)	42	25	6	11	86	50	+36	81 (Note: Rayo Vallecano B promoted to Segunda División B replacing Real Madrid C.)
3	Unión Adarve	42	23	12	7	60	30	+30	81
4	San Sebastián de los Reyes	42	23	11	8	68	31	+37	80
5	Internacional	42	25	5	12	69	46	+23	80
6	Pozuelo de Alarcón	42	19	14	9	60	37	+23	71
7	Rayo Majadahonda	42	20	9	13	71	57	+14	69
8	San Fernando	42	18	13	11	58	40	+18	67
9	RSD Alcalá	42	18	13	11	50	32	+18	67
10	Parla	42	16	15	11	52	50	+2	63
11	Alcobendas Sport	42	15	11	16	46	49	−3	56
12	Colmenar Viejo	42	14	13	15	63	70	−7	55
13	Alcorcón B	42	15	6	21	65	67	−2	51
14	Atlético de Madrid C	42	13	11	18	56	62	−6	50
15	Atlético Pinto	42	12	14	16	58	61	−3	50
16	Torrejón	42	13	11	18	56	64	−8	50
17	Collado Villalba (R)	42	10	15	17	37	56	−19	45
18	Aravaca (R)	42	10	12	20	44	65	−21	42
19	Real Aranjuez (R)	42	9	7	26	43	82	−39	34
20	Carabanchel (R)	42	5	16	21	33	68	−35	31
21	Vicálvaro (R)	42	5	13	24	22	65	−43	28
22	Los Yébenes-San Bruno (R)	42	6	10	26	43	90	−47	28

Updated to match(es) played on 1 March 2014. Source: Madrid Football Federation Official League Table
Rules for classification: 1) points; 2) goal difference; 3) number of goals scored.
(P) Promoted; (R) Relegated
Notes:

Top goalscorer

Goalscorers	Goals	Team
(Spain) Álex Fernández	22	Internacional
(Spain) Christian Seubert	21	San Fernando
(Spain) Joaquín Cerda	18	Trival Valderas
(Spain) Alberto Palacios	17	Trival Valderas
(Spain) Gorka Bernardos	17	Torrejón

Top goalkeeper

Goalkeeper	Goals	Matches	Average	Team
(Spain) Juancho Lechón	28	40	0.7	RSD Alcalá

=== Group VIII – Castile and León ===
The Group VIII is played by teams from Castile and León. If there are promotions to Segunda División B there will be as many promotions from Regional Preferente as necessary to have 20 teams in the league. Also, if any of the teams of the Autonomous Community from 2013–14 Segunda División B are relegated to Tercera, there will be the necessary additional relegations to remain 20 teams.

- New teams: Cebrereña, La Bañeza, Becerril, Atlético Tordesillas, CD Burgos (promoted from Primera Regional), Salmantino (new creation team)
- Teams which left the league: Burgos, Cultural Leonesa (promoted to 2013–14 Segunda División B), Villaralbo, Cuéllar (relegated to Primera Regional), Salamanca B, Palencia (dissolved)
Location of teams of the 2013–14 Tercera División Group VIII

Pos	Team	Pld	W	D	L	GF	GA	GD	Pts
1	Real Valladolid B (P)	38	25	8	5	71	30	+41	83
2	Atlético Astorga (P)	38	23	8	7	68	32	+36	77
3	Arandina	38	21	12	5	60	31	+29	75
4	Real Ávila	38	20	9	9	65	35	+30	69
5	Numancia B	38	19	7	12	57	42	+15	64
6	Gimnástica Segoviana	38	17	11	10	58	47	+11	62
7	Almazán	38	16	13	9	45	35	+10	61
8	CD Burgos	38	16	11	11	51	44	+7	59
9	Salmantino	38	15	9	14	52	54	−2	54
10	La Virgen del Camino	38	13	7	18	59	64	−5	46
11	La Granja	38	10	16	12	46	52	−6	46
12	Atlético Bembibre	38	12	9	17	48	47	+1	45
13	La Bañeza	38	11	11	16	55	66	−11	44
14	Cebrereña	38	9	15	14	50	66	−16	42
15	Atlético Tordesillas	38	10	12	16	40	57	−17	42
16	Cristo Atlético	38	12	5	21	45	60	−15	41
17	Becerril	38	10	10	18	38	58	−20	40
18	Unami (R)	38	10	10	18	50	64	−14	40
19	Santa Marta de Tormes (R)	38	8	7	23	31	64	−33	31
20	Racing Lermeño (R)	38	4	8	26	26	67	−41	20

(P) Promoted; (R) Relegated

Top goalscorer

Goalscorers	Goals	Team
(Spain) Rubén Díaz	29	Valladolid B
(Spain) Pito	23	Real Ávila
(Spain) David Terleira	21	Cebrereña
(Spain) Mariano González	17	Gimnástica Segoviana
(Spain) Emilio López	16	Real Ávila

Top goalkeeper

Goalkeeper	Goals	Matches	Average	Team
(Spain) Julio Iricibar	27	36	0.75	Valladolid B

=== Group IX – Eastern Andalusia and Melilla ===
Location of teams of the 2013–14 Tercera División Group IX

Pos	Team	Pld	W	D	L	GF	GA	GD	Pts
1	Marbella (P)	38	27	5	6	81	37	+44	86
2	Linares	38	24	10	4	70	28	+42	82
3	Atlético Malagueño	38	25	7	6	74	34	+40	82
4	Loja	38	24	7	7	88	44	+44	79
5	Atlético Mancha Real	38	22	6	10	51	31	+20	72
6	Vélez	38	19	10	9	60	31	+29	67
7	Martos	38	17	9	12	65	49	+16	60
8	Villacarrillo	38	16	11	11	63	46	+17	59
9	Huétor Tájar	38	14	11	13	36	42	−6	53
10	Atarfe Industrial	38	14	8	16	48	49	−1	50
11	Maracena	38	15	4	19	44	44	0	49
12	Español del Alquián	38	14	7	17	58	71	−13	49
13	Antequera	38	12	8	18	43	54	−11	44
14	San Pedro	38	11	11	16	34	54	−20	44
15	Ronda	38	12	7	19	48	58	−10	43
16	Los Molinos	38	12	7	19	52	64	−12	43
17	Los Villares	38	12	6	20	36	55	−19	42
18	Melilla B (R)	38	11	7	20	44	66	−22	40
19	Huércal (R)	38	4	1	33	29	106	−77	13
20	Unión Estepona (Note: Team withdrawn from the competition) (D)	38	2	4	32	16	77	−61	0

(D) Disqualified; (P) Promoted; (R) Relegated
Notes:

Top goalscorer

Goalscorers	Goals	Team
(Spain) Juanfran Holanda	23	Loja
(Spain) David Picha	22	Español del Alquián
(Spain) Rafa Payán	20	Linares
(Spain) José Cazorla	20	Loja
(Spain) Javier Añón	19	Marbella

Top goalkeeper

Goalkeeper	Goals	Matches	Average	Team
(Spain) Imanol Cabello	19	28	0.68	Vélez

=== Group X – Western Andalusia and Ceuta ===
Location of teams of the 2013–14 Tercera División Group X

Pos	Team	Pld	W	D	L	GF	GA	GD	Pts
1	Betis B (P)	38	23	7	8	70	37	+33	76
2	San Roque de Lepe (P)	38	22	9	7	60	29	+31	75
3	Alcalá	38	21	9	8	78	43	+35	72
4	Ceuta	38	20	9	9	54	33	+21	69
5	Mairena	38	17	10	11	61	54	+7	61
6	Gerena	38	15	15	8	64	40	+24	60
7	Cabecense	38	16	10	12	60	45	+15	58
8	San Juan	38	14	14	10	54	53	+1	56
9	Lebrijana	38	16	7	15	51	49	+2	55
10	Conil	38	16	7	15	41	43	−2	55
11	Cádiz B	38	15	7	16	49	46	+3	52
12	Coria	38	13	12	13	48	53	−5	51
13	Recreativo B	38	14	8	16	57	58	−1	50
14	San Roque	38	14	6	18	56	54	+2	48
15	Sevilla C	38	12	9	17	43	58	−15	45
16	La Palma	38	13	5	20	46	61	−15	44
17	Arcos	38	11	9	18	36	53	−17	42
18	Pozoblanco (R)	38	12	6	20	37	68	−31	42
19	Xerez (D)	38	8	8	22	41	65	−24	32
20	Ayamonte (Note: Team withdrawn from the competition) (D)	38	4	1	33	16	80	−64	0
21	Racing Portuense (D)	0	0	0	0	0	0	0	0

(D) Disqualified; (P) Promoted; (R) Relegated
Notes:

Top goalscorer

Goalscorers	Goals	Team
(Spain) Gonzalo Triguero	20	Alcalá
(Spain) José Manuel Naranjo	19	Recreativo B
(Spain) José Antonio Prieto	18	Ceuta
(Spain) Guarte	16	La Palma
(Spain) Antonio Domínguez	16	Recreativo B

Top goalkeeper

Goalkeeper	Goals	Matches	Average	Team
(Spain) Javi Montoya	35	35	1	Betis B

=== Group XI – Balearic Islands ===
Location of teams of the 2013–14 Tercera División Group XI

Pos	Team	Pld	W	D	L	GF	GA	GD	Pts
1	Mallorca B (P)	38	25	8	5	90	27	+63	83
2	Peña Deportiva	38	24	8	6	75	33	+42	80
3	Formentera	38	24	8	6	58	27	+31	80
4	Binissalem	38	18	13	7	56	31	+25	67
5	Mercadal	38	19	8	11	55	53	+2	65
6	Poblense	38	17	13	8	60	35	+25	64
7	Alcúdia	38	16	12	10	59	41	+18	60
8	Penya Ciutadella	38	17	3	18	47	51	−4	54
9	Llosetense	38	15	9	14	54	53	+1	54
10	Manacor	38	14	11	13	63	62	+1	53
11	Collerense	38	16	5	17	60	60	0	53
12	Platges de Calvià	38	12	13	13	41	40	+1	49
13	Campos	38	12	11	15	51	54	−3	47
14	Ferriolense	38	12	9	17	41	50	−9	45
15	Atlético Rafal	38	10	12	16	42	65	−23	42
16	San Rafael	38	10	10	18	47	60	−13	40
17	Montuïri	38	10	8	20	42	53	−11	38
18	Rotlet Molinar (R)	38	11	4	23	43	84	−41	37
19	Felanitx (R)	38	6	8	24	27	65	−38	26
20	Santanyí (R)	38	2	7	29	26	93	−67	13

Updated to match(es) played on 1 March 2014. Source: Balearic Football Federation Official League Table
Rules for classification: 1) points; 2) goal difference; 3) number of goals scored.
(P) Promoted; (R) Relegated

Top goalscorer

Goalscorers	Goals	Team
(Spain) Manuel Salinas	31	Peña Deportiva
(Nigeria) Cedric Omoigui	27	Mallorca B
(Spain) Miquel Ripoll	22	Alcúdia
(Spain) David Camps	19	Penya Ciutadella
(Spain) Francisco José Barbón	17	Manacor

Top goalkeeper

Goalkeeper	Goals	Matches	Average	Team
(Spain) Marcos Contreras	25	37	0.68	Formentera

=== Group XII – Canary Islands ===
Location of teams of the 2013–14 Tercera División Group XII

Pos	Team	Pld	W	D	L	GF	GA	GD	Pts
1	Atlético Granadilla	38	26	4	8	68	34	+34	82
2	Marino	38	25	6	7	59	29	+30	81
3	Mensajero	38	22	11	5	57	18	+39	77
4	Tenerife B	38	22	8	8	76	44	+32	74
5	Estrella	38	20	6	12	59	39	+20	66
6	Villa de Santa Brígida	38	19	8	11	69	49	+20	65
7	La Victoria de Acentejo	38	15	9	14	49	55	−6	54
8	Tenisca	38	14	11	13	66	57	+9	53
9	Unión Sur Yaiza	38	14	10	14	51	47	+4	52
10	El Cotillo	38	15	5	18	48	52	−4	50
11	Lanzarote	38	14	6	18	33	44	−11	48
12	Las Zocas	38	12	10	16	38	47	−9	46
13	Laguna	38	12	9	17	38	48	−10	45
14	Unión Viera	38	12	9	17	50	53	−3	45
15	Ibarra	38	10	11	17	47	67	−20	41
16	Telde	38	10	9	19	50	62	−12	39
17	Vera	38	9	6	23	48	93	−45	33
18	Raqui San Isidro (R)	38	8	7	23	34	73	−39	31
19	Realejos (R)	38	8	3	27	41	85	−44	27
20	Vecindario (Note: Team disqualified from the competition for unpaid debts) (D)	38	12	14	12	60	45	+15	0

(D) Disqualified; (R) Relegated
Notes:

Top goalscorer

Goalscorers	Goals	Team
(Spain) Yeray Pérez	21	Mensajero
(Spain) Murci	19	Marino
(Spain) Miguel Yunes	17	Unión Sur Yaiza
(Spain) Chema González	17	Tenisca
(Spain) Jefté Betancor	17	Tenerife B

Top goalkeeper

Goalkeeper	Goals	Matches	Average	Team
(Venezuela) Luis Arellano	18	38	0.47	Mensajero

=== Group XIII – Region of Murcia ===
Location of teams of the 2013–14 Tercera División Group XIII

Pos	Team	Pld	W	D	L	GF	GA	GD	Pts
1	UCAM Murcia (P)	36	28	4	4	71	15	+56	88
2	Yeclano	36	23	6	7	78	34	+44	75
3	Águilas	36	23	4	9	71	33	+38	73
4	Mar Menor	36	21	7	8	75	38	+37	70
5	La Unión	36	21	6	9	80	32	+48	69
6	Jumilla	36	20	4	12	69	56	+13	64
7	El Castillo	36	16	8	12	50	40	+10	56
8	Minera	36	15	11	10	59	49	+10	56
9	Real Murcia Imperial	36	13	9	14	57	54	+3	48
10	Plus Ultra	36	14	5	17	48	57	−9	47
11	Cieza	36	13	6	17	54	64	−10	45
12	El Palmar Estrella Grana	36	11	10	15	49	55	−6	43
13	Cartagena FC	36	12	6	18	46	69	−23	42
14	Edeco Fortuna	36	11	6	19	43	66	−23	39
15	Muleño	36	9	8	19	44	75	−31	35
16	Molina	36	10	5	21	37	64	−27	35
17	Atlético Pulpileño (R)	36	8	8	20	35	60	−25	32
18	Bullense (R)	36	8	3	25	31	80	−49	27
19	Olímpico de Totana (R)	36	5	6	25	38	94	−56	21

(P) Promoted; (R) Relegated

Top goalscorer

Goalscorers	Goals	Team
(Spain) Ginés Meca	37	Águilas
(Spain) Joseto López	26	Yeclano
(Spain) Andrés Carrasco	20	UCAM Murcia
(Spain) Luis Domenech	18	Yeclano
(Spain) Carlos Saura	18	Minera

Top goalkeeper

Goalkeeper	Goals	Matches	Average	Team
(Spain) Fran Martínez	28	30	0.93	Yeclano

=== Group XIV – Extremadura ===
Location of teams of the 2013–14 Tercera División Group XIV

Pos	Team	Pld	W	D	L	GF	GA	GD	Pts
1	Villanovense (P)	40	31	7	2	77	17	+60	100
2	Mérida	40	28	10	2	88	27	+61	94
3	Jerez	40	29	7	4	77	21	+56	94
4	Badajoz CF	40	29	7	4	84	17	+67	94
5	Coria	40	26	9	5	81	35	+46	87
6	Extremadura	40	22	8	10	78	36	+42	74
7	Don Benito	40	16	11	13	52	35	+17	59
8	Díter Zafra	40	14	11	15	68	60	+8	53
9	Atlético Pueblonuevo	40	15	8	17	66	54	+12	53
10	Azuaga	40	14	10	16	68	78	−10	52
11	Plasencia	40	16	4	20	66	63	+3	52
12	Atlético San José	40	14	10	16	48	49	−1	52
13	Hernán Cortés	40	12	10	18	28	49	−21	46
14	Olivenza	40	11	13	16	38	49	−11	46
15	Santa Amalia	40	13	6	21	43	69	−26	45
16	Castuera	40	11	12	17	51	68	−17	45
17	Fuente de Cantos	40	10	11	19	48	61	−13	41
18	Cacereño B (R)	40	7	10	23	32	81	−49	31
19	Miajadas (R)	40	7	3	30	42	110	−68	24
20	Valverdeño (R)	40	4	8	28	48	103	−55	20
21	Ciudad de Plasencia (R)	40	2	3	35	27	128	−101	9

(P) Promoted; (R) Relegated

Top goalscorer

Goalscorers	Goals	Team
(Spain) Chema Martín	30	Coria
(Spain) Luismi Álvarez	29	Plasencia
(Spain) Abraham Pozo	24	Díter Zafra
(Spain) Valentín García	21	Atlético Pueblonuevo
(Nigeria) Sunny Ogbemudia	20	Mérida

Top goalkeeper

Goalkeeper	Goals	Matches	Average	Team
(Spain) José Antonio Fuentes	17	37	0.46	Villanovense

=== Group XV – Navarre ===
Location of teams of the 2013–14 Tercera División Group XV

Pos	Team	Pld	W	D	L	GF	GA	GD	Pts
1	Izarra	38	25	10	3	59	16	+43	85
2	San Juan	38	24	13	1	57	14	+43	85
3	Mutilvera	38	22	9	7	57	26	+31	75
4	Osasuna B	38	23	6	9	76	32	+44	75
5	Chantrea	38	18	12	8	56	36	+20	66
6	Valle de Egüés	38	18	8	12	60	49	+11	62
7	Cortes	38	11	19	8	44	43	+1	52
8	Oberena	38	14	8	16	45	49	−4	50
9	Iruña	38	12	12	14	44	48	−4	48
10	Atlético Cirbonero	38	12	10	16	47	50	−3	46
11	Pamplona	38	12	10	16	51	57	−6	46
12	Huarte	38	11	13	14	41	44	−3	46
13	Burladés	38	11	13	14	37	41	−4	46
14	Corellano	38	12	6	20	47	57	−10	42
15	Atlético Valtierrano	38	11	9	18	42	64	−22	42
16	Beti Onak	38	11	9	18	50	59	−9	42
17	Lagun Artea (R)	38	10	11	17	48	62	−14	41
18	Murchante (R)	38	11	3	24	34	62	−28	36
19	Erriberri (R)	38	7	11	20	31	64	−33	32
20	Atlético Artajonés (R)	38	5	8	25	25	78	−53	23

(R) Relegated

Top goalscorer

Goalscorers	Goals	Team
(Spain) Ángel Arizcuren	21	Beti Onak
(Spain) Unai Bakaikoa	15	Lagun Artea
(Spain) Alberto Rives	15	San Juan
(Spain) Raúl Chueca	15	Cortes
(Spain) Maikel Mesa	15	Osasuna B

Top goalkeeper

Goalkeeper	Goals	Matches	Average	Team
(Spain) Iván Contreras	11	32	0.34	Izarra

=== Group XVI – La Rioja ===
Location of teams of the 2013–14 Tercera División Group XVI

Pos	Team	Pld	W	D	L	GF	GA	GD	Pts
1	Varea	38	27	7	4	101	40	+61	88
2	Haro	38	23	14	1	92	24	+68	83
3	Anguiano	38	23	7	8	81	38	+43	76
4	Náxara	38	22	10	6	86	33	+53	76
5	Atlético Vianés	38	23	4	11	65	41	+24	73
6	Alfaro	38	20	11	7	59	27	+32	71
7	Oyonesa	38	21	8	9	49	32	+17	71
8	Calahorra	38	20	11	7	59	27	+32	71
9	Agoncillo	38	14	13	11	56	43	+13	55
10	River Ebro	38	12	11	15	56	65	−9	47
11	La Calzada	38	10	12	16	39	69	−30	42
12	Ciudad de Alfaro	38	10	9	19	34	58	−24	39
13	Peña Balsamaiso	38	10	7	21	37	74	−37	37
14	Arnedo	38	10	7	21	33	58	−25	37
15	Villegas	38	9	9	20	37	59	−22	36
16	Calasancio	38	9	9	20	32	52	−20	36
17	San Marcial (R)	38	9	6	23	45	78	−33	33
18	Pradejón (R)	38	8	8	22	39	77	−38	32
19	Berceo (R)	38	6	11	21	35	67	−32	29
20	Alberite (R)	38	5	4	29	36	109	−73	19

(R) Relegated

Top goalscorer

Goalscorers	Goals	Team
(Spain) Rubén Pérez	39	Varea
(Spain) César Huete	21	Calahorra
(Spain) Chimbo	20	Varea
(Spain) Víctor Escribano	18	Oyonesa
(Spain) Abel Merino	17	San Marcial

Top goalkeeper

Goalkeeper	Goals	Matches	Average	Team
(Spain) Javi Ríos	19	27	0.7	Haro

=== Group XVII – Aragon ===
Location of teams of the 2013–14 Tercera División Group XVII

Pos	Team	Pld	W	D	L	GF	GA	GD	Pts
1	Zaragoza B (P)	40	30	5	5	95	30	+65	95
2	Teruel	40	23	9	8	56	41	+15	78
3	Ejea	40	20	12	8	58	29	+29	72
4	Almudévar	40	20	11	9	78	37	+41	71 (Note: Almudévar could not participate in the play-offs as they are reserve team of Huesca who are in Segunda División B.)
5	Atlético Monzón	40	20	11	9	65	48	+17	71
6	Tarazona	40	20	10	10	67	52	+15	70
7	Utebo	40	21	6	13	57	51	+6	69
8	Borja	40	17	13	10	52	34	+18	64
9	Barbastro	40	18	5	17	56	49	+7	59
10	Andorra	40	15	12	13	44	42	+2	57
11	Villanueva	40	15	12	13	57	47	+10	57
12	Tamarite	40	16	8	16	54	64	−10	56
13	Ebro	40	14	9	17	67	54	+13	51
14	Sabiñánigo	40	13	12	15	52	59	−7	51
15	Illueca	40	14	7	19	40	51	−11	49
16	Cuarte	40	12	12	16	47	53	−6	48
17	Brea (R)	40	11	6	23	39	76	−37	39
18	Atlético Calatayud (R)	40	10	8	22	46	79	−33	38
19	Atlético Escalerillas (R)	40	7	7	26	36	77	−41	28
20	Altorricón (R)	40	7	3	30	36	83	−47	24
21	Oliver (R)	40	5	6	29	35	81	−46	21

(P) Promoted; (R) Relegated
Notes:

Top goalscorer

Goalscorers	Goals	Team
(Spain) Toni Gabarre	31	Almudévar
(Spain) Adán Pérez	20	Zaragoza B
(Spain) Javier Lezaun	18	Tarazona
(Spain) Petro	17	Sabiñánigo
(Spain) Lucho Sánchez	16	Borja

Top goalkeeper

Goalkeeper	Goals	Matches	Average	Team
(Spain) Rafa Santos	24	34	0.71	Ejea

=== Group XVIII – Castilla-La Mancha ===
Location of teams of the 2013–14 Tercera División Group XVIII

Pos	Team	Pld	W	D	L	GF	GA	GD	Pts
1	Puertollano	38	31	5	2	88	18	+70	98 (Note: Puertollano renounced promotion to Segunda División B.)
2	Socuéllamos (P)	38	25	8	5	72	26	+46	83
3	Villarrobledo	38	22	10	6	80	32	+48	76
4	Almansa	38	20	12	6	53	36	+17	72
5	Talavera de la Reina	38	21	9	8	72	34	+38	72
6	Villarrubia	38	16	10	12	48	56	−8	58
7	Pedroñeras	38	14	12	12	42	50	−8	54
8	La Gineta	38	12	12	14	51	55	−4	48
9	Atlético Ibañés	38	11	14	13	44	50	−6	47
10	Quintanar del Rey	38	12	11	15	44	56	−12	47
11	Manzanares	38	11	12	15	41	46	−5	45
12	Ciudad Real	38	10	13	15	43	54	−11	43
13	Albacete B	38	10	13	15	45	58	−13	43
14	Gimnástico	38	11	8	19	46	56	−10	41
15	Hellín	38	10	13	15	35	40	−5	41 (Note: Hellín two points deducted.)
16	Mora	38	12	4	22	37	63	−26	40
17	Madridejos	38	8	14	16	30	41	−11	38
18	Illescas (R)	38	8	12	18	39	59	−20	36
19	Azuqueca (R)	38	9	9	20	36	53	−17	36
20	Zona 5 (R)	38	2	9	27	34	97	−63	15

Updated to match(es) played on 1 March 2014. Source: FFCM Official League Table
Rules for classification: 1) points; 2) goal difference; 3) number of goals scored.
(P) Promoted; (R) Relegated
Notes:

Top goalscorer

Goalscorers	Goals	Team
(Spain) Juanma Ortiz	24	Villarrobledo
(Spain) José María Mena	20	Talavera de la Reina
(Spain) José Manuel Pérez	18	Puertollano
(Spain) Josete Martínez	18	La Gineta
(Spain) Rubén Moreno	17	Puertollano

== Notes ==
- 11 November 2013: Tolo Barceló, the goalkeeper of UD Alcúdia, scores with an overhead kick in the last minute against RCD Mallorca B.
- 12 November 2013: Pablo Orbaiz, former player of Athletic Bilbao returns to football after retirement, as a player and youth coach of CD Valle de Egüés.
- 19 January 2014: Death of Manuel Candocia in the 82' minute during the game between UD Somozas and CCD Cerceda, mayor of As Somozas and president of UD Somozas. The last minutes of the game were played the 12 March.
- February 2014: The heavy surge in the North of Spain busts the field of Real Tapia CF.
- 10 February 2014: Óscar Alcides Mena, the manager of Atlético Madrid C is promoted to B team.
- 13 February 2014: Death of Eulogio Vázquez, former president of Pontevedra CF
- 2 March 2014: The Group II game between Andés CF and Urraca CF was stopped in the first minute to protest against the schedules of the games of La Liga, supposing a damage to the teams of lower divisions. Two weeks later, on 16 March, this action was repeated in the game of the same group between Condal Club and CD Lealtad.
