= Iglesia de El Salvador, Santa Cruz de La Palma =

Iglesia de El Salvador
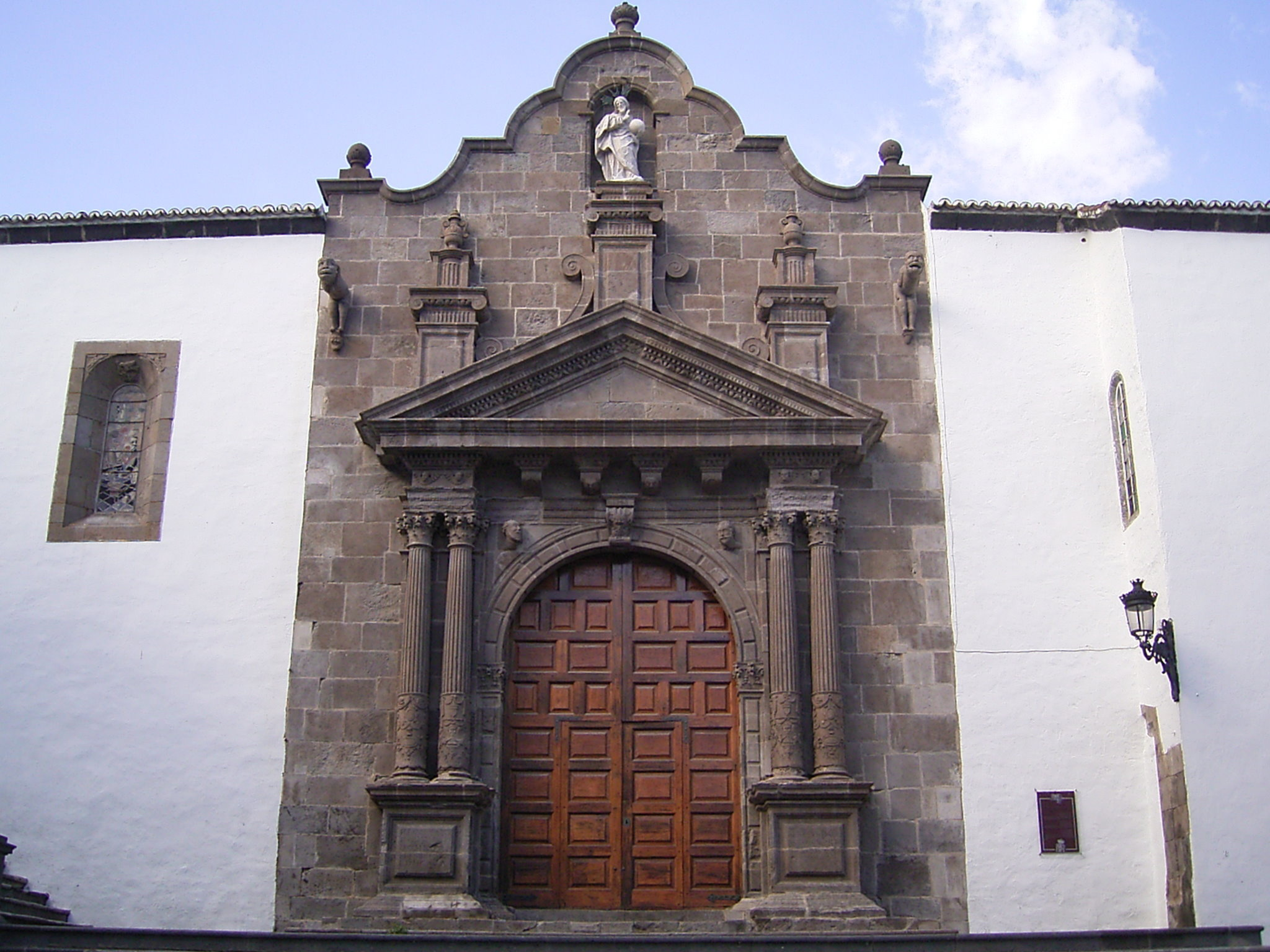
- Facade
- Iglesia de El Salvador
- 28.6836°N 17.7649°W
- Location: Santa Cruz de La Palma
- Country: Spain
- Denomination: Catholic

History
- Consecrated: c. 1500

Architecture
- Functional status: active church
- Architectural type: Basilica
- Style: Baroque

Administration
- Diocese: Diocese of Canarias

The Iglesia de El Salvador is the Catholic mother church and parish of Santa Cruz de La Palma, the capital of La Palma, one of the Spanish Canary Isles. It was built around 1500 and modified and expanded several times.

== History ==
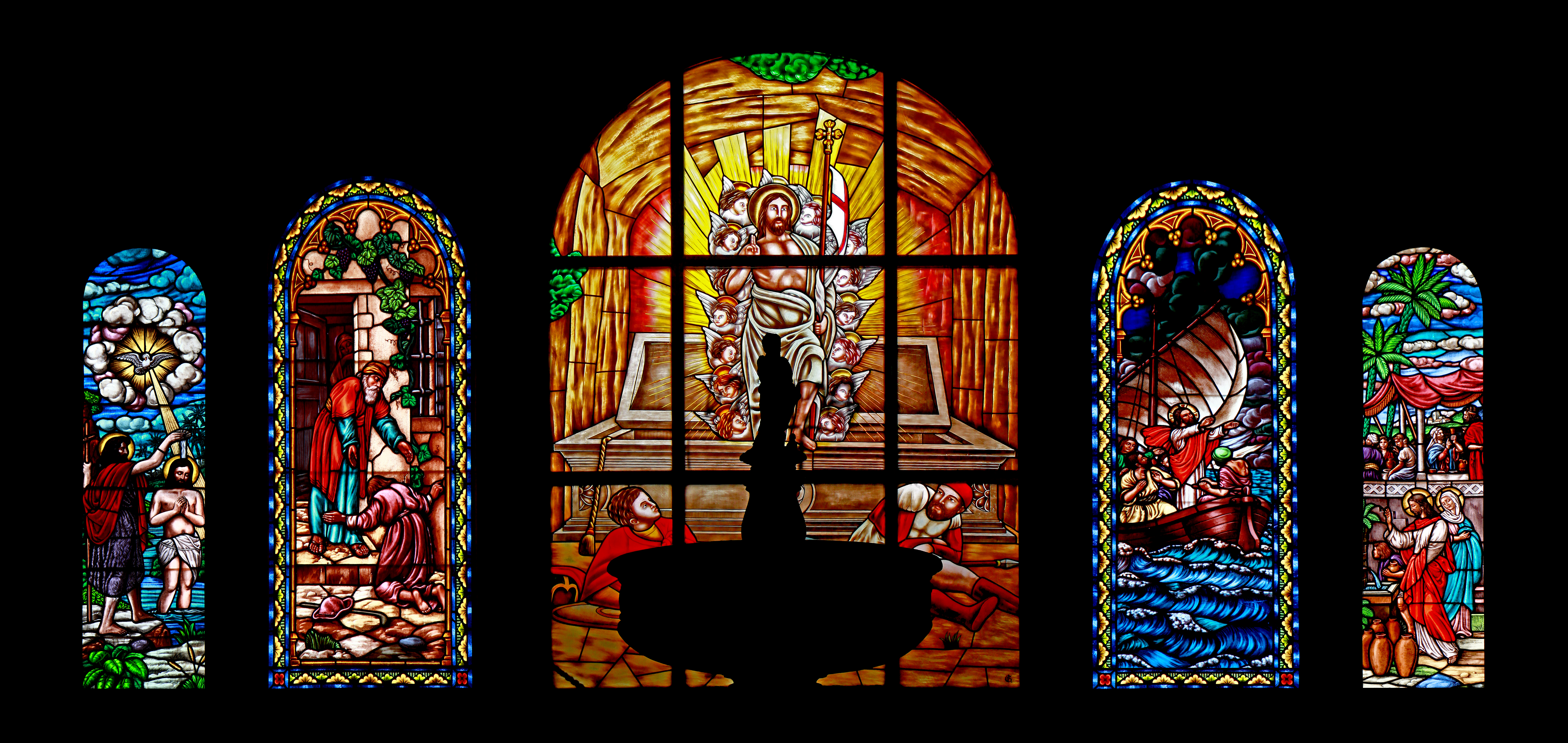
Stained glass windows in the Iglesia de El Salvador, Santa Cruz de La Palma

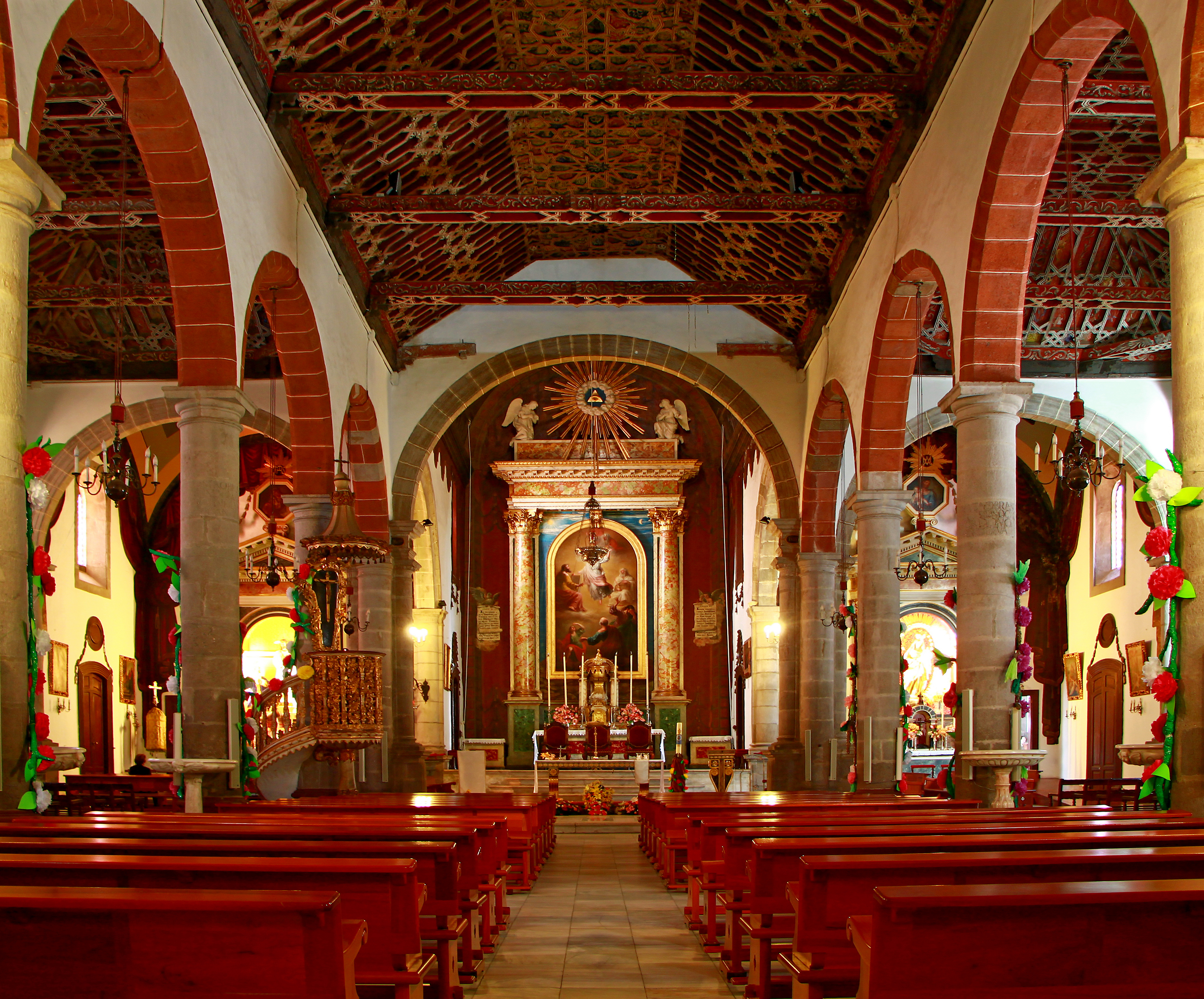
Interior of the Iglesia de El Salvador, Santa Cruz de La Palma

The church building was begun in the early 16th century. The church and parish are dedicated to El Salvador, Jesus as the Redeemer. The first church was in Renaissance style. The exterior features a portal resembling a Roman triumphal arch as a symbol of the triumph of Jesus in the church.

Today's building is the result of several architectural changes and expansions. The interior of the basilica with three naves is predominantly in Baroque style. The main altarpiece is a neoclassical painting of the Transfiguration of Jesus.

Cada cinco años la Iglesia Matriz de El Salvador acoge durante aproximadamente un mes a la imagen de la Virgen de las Nieves (patrona de la isla de La Palma), durante las Fiestas Lustrales de la Bajada de la Virgen.

En las escalinatas de acceso al templo, se encuentra la estatua de bronce del cura párroco Manuel Díaz Hernández, más conocido como el "cura Díaz", fallecido en este lugar el 5 de abril de 1863.
