= 1993–94 Copa Federación de España =

Tournament details
- Country: Spain
- Teams: 16

Final positions
- Champions: Puertollano Industrial
- Runner-up: Platges de Calvià

Tournament statistics
- Matches played: 13

The 1993–94 Copa Federación de España was the first edition of the Copa Federación de España, a knockout competition for Spanish football clubs, since its reinstatement.

== Competition ==
=== First round ===
Team 1	Agg.	Team 2	1st leg	2nd leg
Puertollano Industrial (Castilla–La Mancha)	7–0	(Extremadura) Plasencia	3–0	4–0
Atarfe Industrial (Andalusia)	2–4	(Valencian Community) Oliva	1–0	1–4
San Juan (Andalusia)	3–2	(Canary Islands) Laguna	2–1	1–1
Huesca (Aragon)	2–2 (p)	(Basque Country (autonomous community)) Amurrio	2–0	0–2
Terrassa (Catalonia)	1–2	(Balearic Islands) Platges de Calvià	1–1	0–1

=== Quarterfinals ===
Team 1	Agg.	Team 2	1st leg	2nd leg
Calahorra (La Rioja)	4–7	(Aragon) Huesca	1–3	3–4
Noja (Cantabria)	2–1	(Community of Madrid) San Sebastián de los Reyes	1–0	1–1
Oliva (Valencian Community)	0–1	(Balearic Islands) Platges de Calvià	0–0	0–1
Puertollano Industrial (Castilla–La Mancha)	3–5	(Andalusia) San Juan	3–0	0–2

=== Semi-finals ===
Team 1	Agg.	Team 2	1st leg	2nd leg
Huesca (Aragon)	2–4	(Balearic Islands) Platges de Calvià	2–1	0–3
Noja (Cantabria)	1–2	(Castilla–La Mancha) Puertollano Industrial	1–0	0–2

=== Final ===
Team 1	Agg.	Team 2	1st leg	2nd leg
Platges de Calvià (Balearic Islands)	4–6	(Castilla–La Mancha) Puertollano Industrial	4–1	0–5
