= CD Cabecense =

Association football club in Spain

Cabecense
- Full name: Club Deportivo Cabecense
- Founded: 1942
- Ground: Carlos Marchena, Las Cabezas de San Juan, Andalusia, Spain
- Capacity: 3,000
- Chairman: Diego Román Gallego
- Manager: Jesús Valladares
- League: División de Honor – Group 1
- 2025–26: División de Honor – Group 1, 8th of 16
Home colours

Club Deportivo Cabecense is a Spanish football team based in Las Cabezas de San Juan, in the autonomous community of Andalusia. Founded in 1942, it plays in División de Honor – Group 1, holding home matches at Estadio Municipal Carlos Marchena.

== Season to season ==
Season	Tier	Division	Place	Copa del Rey
1942–1971	—	Regional	—	
1971–72	6	2ª Reg.	8th	
1972–73	6	2ª Reg.	10th	
1973–74	6	2ª Reg.	1st	
1974–75	6	2ª Reg.	15th	
1975–76	6	2ª Reg.		
1976–77	6	2ª Reg.		
1977–78	7	2ª Reg.		
1978–79	7	2ª Reg.	6th	
1979–80	7	2ª Reg.	2nd	
1980–81	6	1ª Reg.	21st	
1981–82	7	2ª Reg.	14th	
1982–83	7	2ª Reg.	2nd	
1983–84	6	1ª Reg.	9th	
1984–85	5	Reg. Pref.	19th	
1985–86	6	1ª Reg.	16th	
1986–87	6	1ª Reg.	16th	
1987–88	6	1ª Reg.	1st	
1988–89	5	Reg. Pref.	7th	
1989–90	5	Reg. Pref.	6th	

Season	Tier	Division	Place	Copa del Rey
1990–91	5	Reg. Pref.	16th	
1991–92	6	1ª Reg.	1st	
1992–93	5	Reg. Pref.	8th	
1993–94	5	Reg. Pref.	11th	
1994–95	5	Reg. Pref.	2nd	
1995–96	5	Reg. Pref.	3rd	
1996–97	5	Reg. Pref.	5th	
1997–98	5	Reg. Pref.	18th	
1998–99	6	1ª Reg.	2nd	
1999–2000	6	1ª Reg.	1st	
2000–01	5	Reg. Pref.	7th	
2001–02	5	Reg. Pref.	13th	
2002–03	5	Reg. Pref.	14th	
2003–04	5	Reg. Pref.	10th	
2004–05	6	Reg. Pref.	1st	
2005–06	5	1ª And.	1st	
2006–07	4	3ª	19th	
2007–08	5	1ª And.	8th	
2008–09	5	1ª And.	14th	
2009–10	5	1ª And.	17th	

Season	Tier	Division	Place	Copa del Rey
2010–11	6	Reg. Pref.	2nd	
2011–12	5	1ª And.	1st	
2012–13	4	3ª	6th	
2013–14	4	3ª	7th	
2014–15	4	3ª	16th	
2015–16	4	3ª	16th	
2016–17	4	3ª	14th	
2017–18	4	3ª	9th	
2018–19	4	3ª	20th	
2019–20	5	Div. Hon.	2nd	
2020–21	4	3ª	8th / 4th	
2021–22	5	3ª RFEF	16th	
2022–23	6	Div. Hon.	2nd	
2023–24	5	3ª Fed.	18th	
2024–25	6	Div. Hon.	9th	
2025–26	6	Div. Hon.		

- 9 seasons in Tercera División
- 2 seasons in Tercera Federación/Tercera División RFEF
