= CD Alhaurino =

Spanish football team

Alhaurino
- Full name: Club Deportivo Alhaurino
- Founded: 1908
- Ground: Miguel Fijones, Alhaurín, Andalusia, Spain
- Capacity: 1,500
- Chairman: David Penfold
- Manager: Francis García
- League: Tercera Federación – Group 9
- 2025–26: Tercera Federación – Group 9, 12th of 18
Home colours	Away colours

Club Deportivo Alhaurino is a Spanish football team based in Alhaurín el Grande, in the autonomous community of Andalusia. Founded in 1908 it plays in Tercera Federación – Group 9, holding home matches at Estadio Miguel Fijones, with a capacity of 1,500 seats.

== Season to season ==
Season	Tier	Division	Place	Copa del Rey
1958–59	5	2ª Reg.	3rd	
1959–60	4	1ª Reg.	8th	
1960–61	4	1ª Reg.	2nd	
1961–62	3	3ª	14th	
1962–63	3	3ª	15th	
1963–64	4	1ª Reg.	8th	
1964–65	4	1ª Reg.	(R)	
1965–66	4	1ª Reg.		
1964–1974	DNP			
1973–74	7	2ª Reg. B	7th	
1974–75	6	2ª Reg.	14th	
1975–76	6	2ª Reg.	4th	
1976–77	6	2ª Reg.	7th	
1977–78	7	2ª Reg.	9th	
1978–79	7	2ª Reg.	3rd	
1979–80	7	2ª Reg.	6th	
1980–81	5	Reg. Pref.	3rd	
1981–82	4	3ª	5th	
1982–83	4	3ª	11th	Second round
1983–84	4	3ª	7th	

Season	Tier	Division	Place	Copa del Rey
1984–85	4	3ª	11th	
1985–86	4	3ª	17th	
1986–87	5	Reg. Pref.	3rd	
1987–88	5	Reg. Pref.	3rd	
1988–89	5	Reg. Pref.	11th	
1989–90	5	Reg. Pref.	1st	
1990–91	5	Reg. Pref.	11th	
1991–92	5	Reg. Pref.	6th	
1992–93	5	Reg. Pref.	4th	
1993–94	5	Reg. Pref.	3rd	
1994–95	5	Reg. Pref.	2nd	
1995–96	4	3ª	18th	
1996–97	5	Reg. Pref.	2nd	
1997–98	5	Reg. Pref.	3rd	
1998–99	5	Reg. Pref.	1st	
1999–2000	4	3ª	16th	
2000–01	4	3ª	6th	
2001–02	4	3ª	13th	
2002–03	4	3ª	15th	
2003–04	4	3ª	5th	

Season	Tier	Division	Place	Copa del Rey
2004–05	4	3ª	4th	
2005–06	4	3ª	13th	
2006–07	4	3ª	10th	
2007–08	4	3ª	7th	
2008–09	4	3ª	13th	
2009–10	4	3ª	12th	
2010–11	4	3ª	19th	
2011–12	5	1ª And.	5th	
2012–13	5	1ª And.	3rd	
2013–14	5	1ª And.	3rd	
2014–15	5	1ª And.	4th	
2015–16	5	1ª And.	1st	
2016–17	4	3ª	18th	
2017–18	5	Div. Hon.	4th	
2018–19	4	3ª	15th	
2019–20	5	Div. Hon.	1st	
2020–21	4	3ª	10th / 2nd	
2021–22	5	3ª RFEF	16th	
2022–23	6	Div. Hon.	6th	
2023–24	6	Div. Hon.	5th	

Season	Tier	Division	Place	Copa del Rey
2024–25	6	Div. Hon.	1st	
2025–26	5	3ª Fed.	12th	
2026–27	5	3ª Fed.		

- 23 seasons in Tercera División
- 3 seasons in Tercera Federación/Tercera División RFEF
