= CMD San Juan =

Spanish football club

San Juan de Aznalfarache
- Full name: Club Municipal de Deportes San Juan
- Founded: 1970
- Ground: 1 de Mayo; San Juan de Aznalfarache, Andalusia, Spain
- Capacity: 1,500
- President: Javier Sánchez de Cueto Lorenzo
- Manager: Francisco Cansino
- League: Segunda Andaluza Sevilla – Group 2
- 2024–25: Segunda Andaluza Sevilla – Group 1, 13th of 16
Home colours	Away colours

Club Municipal de Deportes San Juan is a Spanish football team based in San Juan de Aznalfarache, in the autonomous community of Andalusia. Founded in 1970, they play in Segunda Andaluza Sevilla – Group 2, holding home games at Campo Polideportivo Municipal 1 de Mayo, with a capacity of 1,500 people.

== History ==
Founded in 1970 as Unión Deportiva San Juan, the club was renamed Club Municipal de Deportes San Juan in 1985. In 1991, the club achieved a first-ever promotion to Tercera División, playing five consecutive seasons in the division before suffering relegation.

In June 2012, San Juan returned to the fourth tier after San Fernando CD's promotion to Segunda División B. Relegated in 2016, the club suffered another two consecutive relegations in the following two seasons.

== Season to season ==
Season	Tier	Division	Place	Copa del Rey
1971–72	5	2ª Reg.	5th	
1972–73	DNP			
1973–74	5	2ª Reg.	10th	
1974–75	5	2ª Reg.	6th	
1975–76	6	2ª Reg.		
1976–77	6	2ª Reg.		
1977–78	7	2ª Reg.		
1978–79	DNP			
1979–80	7	2ª Reg.	9th	
1980–81	8	2ª Reg. B	8th	
1981–82	8	2ª Reg. B	1st	
1982–83	7	2ª Reg.	4th	
1983–84	6	1ª Reg.	14th	
1984–85	6	1ª Reg.	7th	
1985–86	6	1ª Reg.	2nd	
1986–87	5	Reg. Pref.	3rd	
1987–88	5	Reg. Pref.	1st	
1988–89	5	Reg. Pref.	2nd	
1989–90	5	Reg. Pref.	2nd	
1990–91	5	Reg. Pref.	2nd	

Season	Tier	Division	Place	Copa del Rey
1991–92	4	3ª	5th	
1992–93	4	3ª	4th	First round
1993–94	4	3ª	11th	
1994–95	4	3ª	8th	
1995–96	4	3ª	19th	
1996–97	5	Reg. Pref.	4th	
1997–98	5	Reg. Pref.	4th	
1998–99	5	Reg. Pref.	7th	
1999–2000	5	Reg. Pref.	11th	
2000–01	5	Reg. Pref.	10th	
2001–02	5	Reg. Pref.	1st	
2002–03	5	Reg. Pref.	5th	
2003–04	5	Reg. Pref.	11th	
2004–05	6	Reg. Pref.	6th	
2005–06	6	Reg. Pref.	15th	
2006–07	7	1ª Reg.	1st	
2007–08	6	Reg. Pref.	3rd	
2008–09	5	1ª And.	9th	
2009–10	5	1ª And.	10th	
2010–11	5	1ª And.	3rd	

Season	Tier	Division	Place	Copa del Rey
2011–12	5	1ª And.	2nd	
2012–13	4	3ª	14th	
2013–14	4	3ª	8th	
2014–15	4	3ª	13th	
2015–16	4	3ª	18th	
2016–17	5	Div. Hon.	18th	
2017–18	6	1ª And.	16th	
2018–19	7	2ª And.	7th	
2019–20	7	2ª And.	8th	
2020–21	7	2ª And.	7th	
2021–22	8	2ª And.	7th	
2022–23	8	2ª And.	9th	
2023–24	8	2ª And.	10th	
2024–25	8	2ª And.	13th	
2025–26	8	2ª And.		

- 9 seasons in Tercera División
