= CD Motril Atlético =

Spanish football team

Motril Atlético
- Full name: Club Deportivo Motril Atlético
- Nickname(s): Motril Atlético
- Founded: 2009
- Dissolved: 2015
- Ground: Paulino Salgado, Motril, Andalusia, Spain
- Capacity: 1,500
- Chairman: (Spain) Miguel Gallardo
- Manager: (Spain) Manuel Rojas
- 2014–15: Segunda Andaluza – Granada, 4th of 18
Home colours	Away colours

Club Deportivo Motril Atlético was a Spanish football team based in Motril, Granada, in the autonomous community of Andalusia. Founded in 2009, they were dissolved in 2015. They held home matches at Estadio Paulino Salgado, which had a capacity of 1,500 seats.

== Season to season ==
Season	Tier	Division	Place	Copa del Rey
2009–10	9	3ª Prov.	4th	
2010–11	9	3ª Prov.	6th	
2011–12	8	2ª Prov.	1st	
2012–13	7	1ª Prov.	2nd	
2013–14	6	Reg. Pref.	6th	
2014–15	6	2ª And.	4th	
