= Sporting La Gineta CF =

Sporting La Gineta
- Full name: Sporting La Gineta Club de Fútbol
- Founded: 1972; 1992 (refounded)
- Dissolved: 2022
- Ground: San Martín, La Gineta, Castilla-La Mancha, Spain
- Capacity: 1,000
- Chairman: (Spain) Luis Arroyo
- Manager: (Spain) Pedro Arenas
- 2021–22: Primera Autonómica – Group 1, 14th of 16
Home colours	Away colours

Sporting La Gineta Club de Fútbol was a Spanish football team based in La Gineta, in the autonomous community of Castile-La Mancha. Founded in 1972, refounded in 1992 and dissolved in 2022, it last played in Primera Autonómica – Group 1, holding home games at Estadio San Martín, which holds 1,000 spectators.

== History ==
=== Club background ===
- Sporting La Gineta Club de Fútbol (1972–1990; 2016–2022)
- La Gineta Club de Fútbol (1992–2016)

== Season to season ==
=== Sporting La Gineta (1972–1990) ===
Season	Tier	Division	Place	Copa del Rey
1972–73	6	2ª Reg.	2nd	
1973–74	6	2ª Reg.	2nd	
1974–75	5	1ª Reg.	7th	
1975–76	5	1ª Reg.	20th	
1976–77	6	2ª Reg.	4th	
1977–78	DNP			
1978–79	7	2ª Reg.	3rd	
1979–80	7	2ª Reg.	1st	
1980–81	6	1ª Reg.	12th	

Season	Tier	Division	Place	Copa del Rey
1981–82	6	1ª Reg.	3rd	
1982–83	6	1ª Reg.	1st	
1983–84	5	Reg. Pref.	17th	
1984–85	5	Reg. Pref.	13th	
1985–86	6	1ª Reg.	8th	
1986–87	6	1ª Reg.	13th	
1987–88	6	1ª Reg.	2nd	
1988–89	DNP			
1989–90	7	2ª Reg.	12th	

=== La Gineta / Sporting La Gineta (1992–2022) ===
Season	Tier	Division	Place	Copa del Rey
1992–93	7	2ª Reg.	12th	
1993–94	7	2ª Reg.	2nd	
1994–95	6	1ª Reg.	8th	
1995–96	6	2ª Aut.	9th	
1996–97	6	2ª Aut.	8th	
1997–98	6	2ª Aut.	15th	
1998–99	6	2ª Aut.	13th	
1999–2000	6	2ª Aut.	12th	
2000–01	6	2ª Aut.	10th	
2001–02	6	2ª Aut.	1st	
2002–03	5	1ª Aut.	9th	
2003–04	5	1ª Aut.	3rd	
2004–05	5	1ª Aut.	3rd	
2005–06	5	1ª Aut.	6th	
2006–07	5	1ª Aut.	4th	

Season	Tier	Division	Place	Copa del Rey
2007–08	5	Aut. Pref.	3rd	
2008–09	5	Aut. Pref.	2nd	
2009–10	4	3ª	13th	
2010–11	4	3ª	9th	
2011–12	4	3ª	18th	
2012–13	5	Aut. Pref.	1st	
2013–14	4	3ª	8th	
2014–15	4	3ª	17th	
2015–16	4	3ª	18th	
2016–17	5	Aut. Pref.	3rd	
2017–18	5	Aut. Pref.	3rd	
2018–19	5	Aut. Pref.	4th	
2019–20	5	Aut. Pref.	5th	
2020–21	5	Aut. Pref.	12th	
2021–22	7	1ª Aut.	14th	

- 6 seasons in Tercera División
