= Bajada (festival) =

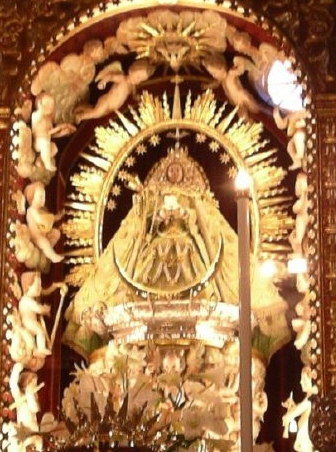
Nuestra Señora de las Nieves (La Palma).

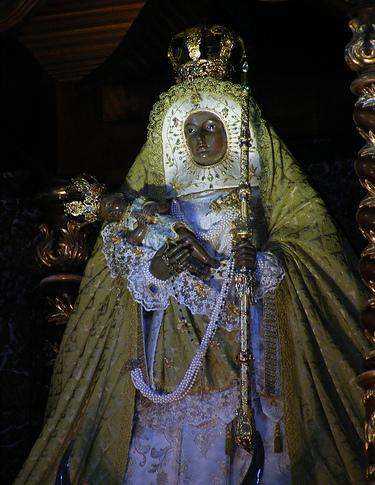
Virgin of Candelaria (Tenerife).

"Bajada" is the shortened version of the Fiestas de la Bajada which is a festival which takes place in several places in the Canary Islands. Bajada is Spanish for "bringing down", and means the bringing of a patron saint's statue from its normal place in a chapel to be celebrated by the people.

== Examples of major bajadas ==
- In La Palma (Santa Cruz de La Palma) the Fiestas Lustrales de la Bajada de la Virgen de las Nieves every five years.
- In El Hierro, the image of the Virgen de los Reyes moved to Valverde every 4 years.
- In La Gomera (Fiestas Lustrales de la Bajada de la Virgen de Guadalupe) every five years, in which a statue of Our Lady of Guadalupe, the patron saint of La Gomera, is brought from the chapel at Puntallana, near San Sebastian de la Gomera, on a celebratory tour of the island.
- In Tenerife, the image of the Virgin of Candelaria (Patron Saint of the Canary Islands) moved to Santa Cruz de Tenerife and San Cristóbal de La Laguna every 7 years alternately.
- In Gran Canaria the image of the Virgen del Pino moved to Las Palmas de Gran Canaria when a major event is held.

== Other ==
Apart from these, there are other in the Canaries that are more regional, among which the following are noteworthy: The Bajada de la Virgen del Pino of El Paso on La Palma every three years, and every five years they celebrate several on other islands, such as the Bajada de la Virgen de los Reyes in Valle Gran Rey and the Our Lady of Mount Carmel of Vallehermoso both in La Gomera, and in Tenerife the Bajada de la Virgen del Socorro in Güímar and that of the Virgen de Abona in Arico.
