= Baeza CF =

Association football club in Spain

Baeza
- Full name: Baeza Club de Fútbol
- Founded: 17 September 1973; 52 years ago
- Ground: Municipal; Baeza, Spain
- Capacity: 5,000
- President: Matías Perales
- Manager: Chico Pérez
- League: División de Honor – Group 2
- 2024–25: Primera Andaluza Jaén, 3rd of 16 (promoted)
Home colours	Away colours

Baeza Club de Fútbol is a Spanish football team based in Baeza, in the autonomous community of Andalusia. Founded in 1973, they currently play in División de Honor – Group 2, holding home matches at Campo de Fútbol Municipal de Baeza, with a capacity of 5,000 spectators.

== History ==
Founded on 17 September 1973 as a replacement to dissolved Baeza Deportivo, Baeza achieved a first-ever promotion to Tercera División in 1990. The club played nine consecutive seasons in that division before suffering relegation in 1999, and closed their senior team in 2002.

Back to an active status in 2003, Baeza remained in the lower leagues in the following campaigns, notably achieving promotion to the División de Honor in 2020 and 2025.

== Season to season ==
Season	Tier	Division	Place	Copa del Rey
1974–75	6	2ª Reg.	9th	
1975–76	6	2ª Reg.		
1976–77	5	1ª Reg.	18th	
1977–78	6	1ª Reg.	15th	
1978–79	6	1ª Reg.	7th	
1979–80	6	1ª Reg.	9th	
1980–81	5	Reg. Pref.	16th	
1981–82	5	Reg. Pref.	5th	
1982–83	6	1ª Reg.	9th	
1983–84	6	1ª Reg.	4th	
1984–85	6	1ª Reg.	4th	
1985–86	6	1ª Reg.	2nd	
1986–87	5	Reg. Pref.	2nd	
1987–88	5	Reg. Pref.	1st	
1988–89	5	Reg. Pref.	3rd	
1989–90	5	Reg. Pref.	2nd	
1990–91	4	3ª	14th	
1991–92	4	3ª	6th	
1992–93	4	3ª	12th	First round
1993–94	4	3ª	8th	

Season	Tier	Division	Place	Copa del Rey
1994–95	4	3ª	9th	
1995–96	4	3ª	11th	
1996–97	4	3ª	13th	
1997–98	4	3ª	5th	
1998–99	4	3ª	21st	
1999–2000	5	Reg. Pref.	5th	
2000–01	5	Reg. Pref.	18th	
2001–02	6	1ª Reg.	3rd	
2002–03	DNP			
2003–04	6	1ª Reg.	2nd	
2004–05	6	Reg. Pref.	3rd	
2005–06	6	Reg. Pref.	1st	
2006–07	5	1ª And.	12th	
2007–08	5	1ª And.	12th	
2008–09	5	1ª And.	7th	
2009–10	5	1ª And.	10th	
2010–11	6	Reg. Pref.	2nd	
2011–12	5	1ª And.	16th	
2012–13	6	Reg. Pref.	3rd	
2013–14	6	Reg. Pref.	5th	

Season	Tier	Division	Place	Copa del Rey
2014–15	6	2ª And.	9th	
2015–16	6	2ª And.	8th	
2016–17	6	1ª And.	7th	
2017–18	6	1ª And.	2nd	
2018–19	6	1ª And.	6th	
2019–20	6	1ª And.	1st	
2020–21	5	Div. Hon.	16th	
2021–22	7	1ª And.	2nd	
2022–23	7	1ª And.	3rd	
2023–24	7	1ª And.	12th	
2024–25	7	1ª And.	3rd	
2025–26	6	Div. Hon.		

- 9 seasons in Tercera División
