= La Palma CF =

Association football club in Spain

La Palma
- Full name: La Palma Club de Fútbol
- Founded: 1915
- Ground: Municipal, La Palma del Condado, Huelva, Andalusia, Spain
- Capacity: 2,000
- Chairman: José Manuel Domínguez
- Manager: Cachola
- League: División de Honor – Group 1
- 2025–26: División de Honor – Group 1, 7th of 16
Home colours	Away colours

La Palma Club de Fútbol is a Spanish football team based in La Palma del Condado, Huelva, in the autonomous community of Andalusia. Founded in 1915, it currently plays in División de Honor – Group 1, holding home matches at Estadio Municipal La Palma del Condado, with a capacity of 2,000 spectators.

== Season to season ==
Season	Tier	Division	Place	Copa del Rey
1915–1954	—	Regional	—	
1954–55	5	2ª Reg.	2nd	
1955–56	5	2ª Reg.	1st	
1956–57	4	1ª Reg.	2nd	
1957–58	3	3ª	8th	
1958–59	3	3ª	14th	
1959–60	3	3ª	5th	
1960–61	3	3ª	4th	
1961–62	3	3ª	10th	
1962–63	3	3ª	13th	
1963–64	3	3ª	14th	
1964–65	4	1ª Reg.	1st	
1965–66	4	1ª Reg.	1st	
1966–67	4	1ª Reg.	2nd	
1967–68	3	3ª	14th	
1968–69	4	1ª Reg.	2nd	
1969–70	4	1ª Reg.	8th	
1970–71	4	1ª Reg.	18th	
1971–72	4	1ª Reg.	12th	
1972–73	4	1ª Reg.	20th	

Season	Tier	Division	Place	Copa del Rey
1973–74	5	2ª Reg.	2nd	
1974–75	5	2ª Reg.	1st	
1975–76	5	1ª Reg.	2nd	
1976–77	5	1ª Reg.	18th	
1977–78	6	1ª Reg.	18th	
1978–79	6	1ª Reg.	3rd	
1979–80	6	1ª Reg.	3rd	
1980–81	5	Reg. Pref.	3rd	
1981–82	5	Reg. Pref.	4th	
1982–83	5	Reg. Pref.	19th	
1983–84	5	Reg. Pref.	6th	
1984–85	5	Reg. Pref.	3rd	
1985–86	5	Reg. Pref.	2nd	
1986–87	5	Reg. Pref.	1st	
1987–88	5	Reg. Pref.	3rd	
1988–89	5	Reg. Pref.	2nd	
1989–90	4	3ª	15th	
1990–91	4	3ª	17th	
1991–92	5	Reg. Pref.	2nd	
1992–93	4	3ª	17th	

Season	Tier	Division	Place	Copa del Rey
1993–94	5	Reg. Pref.	2nd	
1994–95	4	3ª	9th	
1995–96	4	3ª	7th	
1996–97	4	3ª	15th	
1997–98	4	3ª	9th	
1998–99	4	3ª	17th	
1999–2000	4	3ª	13th	
2000–01	4	3ª	19th	
2001–02	5	Reg. Pref.	6th	
2002–03	5	Reg. Pref.	3rd	
2003–04	5	Reg. Pref.	4th	
2004–05	5	1ª And.	13th	
2005–06	6	Reg. Pref.	1st	
2006–07	5	1ª And.	6th	
2007–08	5	1ª And.	6th	
2008–09	5	1ª And.	7th	
2009–10	5	1ª And.	10th	
2010–11	5	1ª And.	9th	
2011–12	5	1ª And.	13th	
2012–13	5	1ª And.	1st	

Season	Tier	Division	Place	Copa del Rey
2013–14	4	3ª	16th	
2014–15	4	3ª	21st	
2015–16	5	1ª And.	5th	
2016–17	5	Div. Hon.	9th	
2017–18	5	Div. Hon.	12th	
2018–19	5	Div. Hon.	10th	
2019–20	5	Div. Hon.	3rd	
2020–21	4	3ª	11th / 7th	
2021–22	6	Div. Hon.	9th	
2022–23	6	Div. Hon.	1st	
2023–24	5	3ª	10th	
2024–25	5	3ª	16th	
2025–26	6	Div. Hon.		

- 21 seasons in Tercera División
- 2 seasons in Tercera Federación
