= CD Mensajero =

Spanish football team

Mensajero
- Full name: Club Deportivo Mensajero
- Nicknames: Mensa; Rojinegros; Plumas Rojas; Los del Barranco de los Dolores
- Founded: 1 June 1922; 104 years ago
- Ground: Silvestre Carrillo, Santa Cruz, La Palma, Canary Islands, Spain
- Capacity: 6,000
- President: Víctor Francisco
- Head coach: Mingo Oramas
- League: Tercera Federación – Group 12
- 2025–26: Tercera Federación – Group 12, 3rd of 18
Home colours	Away colours

Club Deportivo Mensajero is a Spanish football team based in Santa Cruz de la Palma, in the autonomous community of Canary Islands. Founded on 6 January 1922, it plays in Tercera Federación – Group 12, holding home games at Nuevo Estadio Silvestre Carrillo, with a capacity of 6,000 spectators.

== History ==
Mensajero's history can be traced to 1922 when a group of friends in Santa Cruz de la Palma formed a youth team. It was not until 1939 that a senior club was established but, with a formation date in 1922, after an excision of players from Tenisca. The first president was Silvestre Carrillo, with two team stadia eventually being dedicated to him.

The club spent roughly 70 years playing at regional level, with various degrees of success. It won the fourth division title for the Canary Islands in 1985, arriving at the national stage seven years later, after winning promotion to the third level.

During the following ten seasons, Mensajero appeared twice in the playoffs: in the 1994–95 campaign, after 22 wins in the regular season, the promotion group consisted of Córdoba CF, CD Castellón and Sestao Sport Club; after a 6–1 home win against the second team, it entered the last round with chances of being promoted, but lost 1–3 at the Andalusians.

In 1999–2000, Mensajero finished fourth after winning 19 out of 38 in the first stage, the highlights being home wins against Caudal Deportivo (7–0, home) and Sporting de Gijón B (5–1, away). In the playoffs, it could only collect one point in six matches, against Burgos CF, Granada CF and Real Murcia.

The expense of running a relatively small club at a national level began to take its toll and with dramatic cuts in funding, Mensajero was relegated at the end of the 2001–02 season, 11 points behind the penultimate team, CD Onda, and 18 points from the safety zone. Two years later, they dropped down to the regional leagues, vacated Silvestre Carrillo grounds and set up home at the Municipal Estadio Bajamar, sharing it with neighbouring SD Tenisca.

After its grounds' improvements were finished, Mensajero returned home for the end of the 2006–07 season, before gaining promotion back to level four in June 2008 and later back to level three in June 2015. In the 2015-16 season the club managed to retain its place in Tercera División, finished 13th, 4 points away from relegation zone.

== Season to season ==
Season	Tier	Division	Place	Copa del Rey
1948–49	5	2ª Reg.	3rd	
1949–50	5	2ª Reg.	3rd	
1950–51	5	2ª Reg.		
1951–52	5	2ª Reg.	4th	
1952–53	5	2ª Reg.	1st	
1953–54	5	2ª Reg.	1st	
1954–55	4	1ª Reg.	4th	
1955–56	4	1ª Reg.	2nd	
1956–57	4	1ª Reg.	(R)	
1957–58	4	1ª Reg.	1st	
1958–59	4	1ª Reg.	1st	
1959–60	4	1ª Reg.	3rd	
1960–61	4	1ª Reg.	1st	
1961–62	4	1ª Reg.	2nd	
1962–63	4	1ª Reg.	1st	
1963–64	4	1ª Reg.	4th	
1964–65	4	1ª Reg.	8th	
1965–66	4	1ª Reg.	5th	
1966–67	4	1ª Reg.	5th	
1967–68	4	1ª Reg.	8th	

Season	Tier	Division	Place	Copa del Rey
1968–69	4	1ª Reg.	6th	
1969–70	4	1ª Reg.	6th	
1970–71	4	1ª Reg.	2nd	
1971–72	4	1ª Reg.	6th	
1972–73	4	1ª Reg.	6th	
1973–74	4	1ª Reg.	5th	
1974–75	4	1ª Reg.	9th	
1975–76	4	1ª Reg.	12th	
1976–77	5	2ª Reg.	3rd	
1977–78	7	2ª Reg.	2nd	
1978–79	6	1ª Reg.	12th	
1979–80	6	1ª Reg.	1st	
1980–81	5	Reg. Pref.	2nd	
1981–82	4	3ª	18th	
1982–83	5	Reg. Pref.	2nd	
1983–84	4	3ª	2nd	
1984–85	4	3ª	1st	First round
1985–86	4	3ª	3rd	Third round
1986–87	4	3ª	5th	Second round
1987–88	4	3ª	6th	Second round

Season	Tier	Division	Place	Copa del Rey
1988–89	4	3ª	7th	
1989–90	4	3ª	12th	
1990–91	4	3ª	2nd	
1991–92	4	3ª	2nd	Second round
1992–93	3	2ª B	11th	Second round
1993–94	3	2ª B	9th	Third round
1994–95	3	2ª B	2nd	Third round
1995–96	3	2ª B	7th	First round
1996–97	3	2ª B	8th	First round
1997–98	3	2ª B	16th	
1998–99	3	2ª B	6th	
1999–2000	3	2ª B	4th	
2000–01	3	2ª B	10th	Round of 64
2001–02	3	2ª B	20th	
2002–03	4	3ª	11th	
2003–04	4	3ª	16th	
2004–05	4	3ª	11th	
2005–06	4	3ª	19th	
2006–07	5	Int. Pref.	8th	
2007–08	5	Int. Pref.	2nd	

Season	Tier	Division	Place	Copa del Rey
2008–09	4	3ª	4th	
2009–10	4	3ª	5th	
2010–11	4	3ª	13th	
2011–12	4	3ª	13th	
2012–13	4	3ª	5th	
2013–14	4	3ª	3rd	
2014–15	4	3ª	1st	
2015–16	3	2ª B	13th	Second round
2016–17	3	2ª B	17th	
2017–18	4	3ª	2nd	
2018–19	4	3ª	2nd	First round
2019–20	4	3ª	12th	Second round
2020–21	4	3ª	1st / 1st	
2021–22	4	2ª RFEF	14th	First round
2022–23	5	3ª Fed.	1st	
2023–24	4	2ª Fed.	17th	First round
2024–25	5	3ª Fed.	5th	
2025–26	5	3ª Fed.	3rd	
2026–27	5	3ª Fed.		

- 12 seasons in Segunda División B
- 2 seasons in Segunda Federación/Segunda División RFEF
- 25 seasons in Tercera División
- 4 seasons in Tercera Federación

== Stadium ==
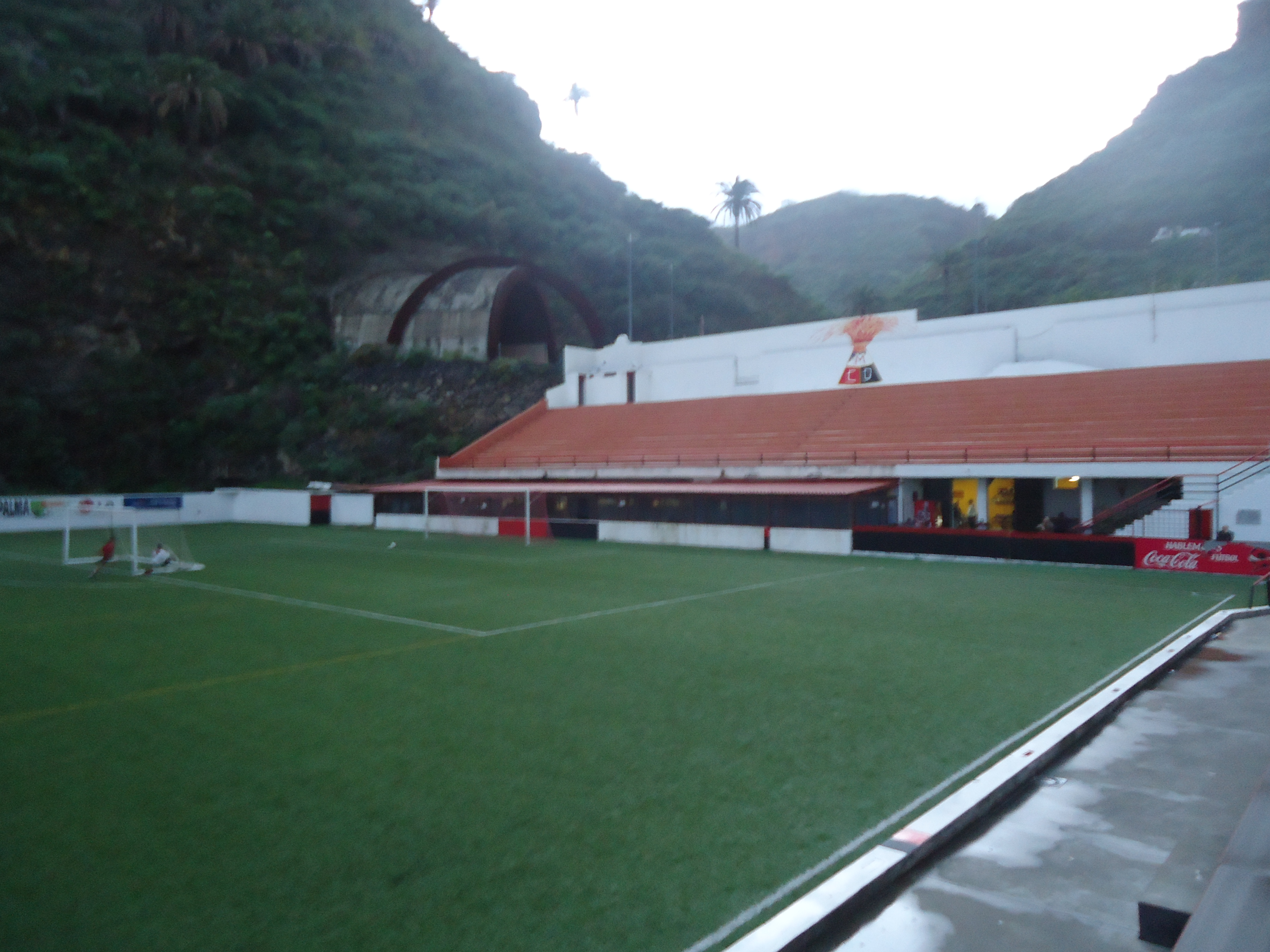
Silvestre Carrillo Stadium

Mensajero play at Nuevo Estadio Silvestre Carrillo. Lying at the head of a valley close to the centre of Santa Cruz de la Palma, the stadium was extensively rebuilt from 2003 to 2007. Due to the steep valley-side to the south side of the pitch and the sheer drop to the north, the majority of the seating has always been found at either end of the stadium. Prior to the redevelopment in 2003, there was a covered stand at the east end of the ground. A narrow strip of terracing ran along the north side of the pitch, which joined the terrace behind the west end goal.

Following redevelopment, the basic orientation of the stadium remained unchanged. There is however, a more substantial area of seating behind the east goal and this now arcs around to the north side. The east end no longer features a roof, something, which the original redevelopment plan included, but due to the financial difficulties that the club experienced, the project was scaled down. The north terrace tapers away to a single line of seating as you head to the west. The West terrace remains relatively unaltered from the original stadium. The players changing facilities are found in a single storey building on the south side of the pitch.

== Local derbies ==
Mensajero's historic rival is SD Tenisca. Since the reorganisation of Tercera División in 1977, the clubs have met in the league on 28 occasions, with six wins for each side and 16 draws.

In 1983, both teams played a league match that was considered to be one of the most violent in the history of Spanish football.
