= Real Betis C =

- Full name: Real Betis Balompié, S.A.D. "C"
- Nicknames: Béticos, Verdiblancos
- Founded: 1962; 2022 (reactivated)
- Dissolved: 2011
- Ground: Ciudad Deportiva, Seville, Andalusia, Spain
- Capacity: 4,000
- President: Ángel Haro García
- Manager: Capi
- League: Tercera Federación – Group 10
- 2025–26: División de Honor – Group 1, 1st of 16 (champions)
Home colours	Away colours	Third colours

Real Betis C is a Spanish football club based in Seville, in the autonomous community of Andalusia. It is the second reserve team of Real Betis, behind Real Betis B.

== History ==
Founded in 1965, the club was active until the 1970s. Back in 2003, they played in the regional leagues and folded in 2011 due to economic problems.

On 21 July 2022, Betis announced the return of their C-team, being placed in Tercera Andaluza, the lowest division of Andalusian football. In March 2026, the club achieved a fourth consecutive promotion to reach Tercera Federación, their first-ever national division.

== Season to season ==
Season	Tier	Division	Place
2003–04	8	2ª Reg.	1st
2004–05	7	1ª Reg.	1st
2005–06	6	Reg. Pref.	5th
2006–07	6	Reg. Pref.	4th
2007–08	6	Reg. Pref.	1st
2008–09	5	1ª And.	7th
2009–10	5	1ª And.	7th
2010–11	5	1ª And.	6th
2011–2022	DNP		
2022–23	9	3ª And.	1st
2023–24	8	2ª And.	1st
2024–25	7	1ª And.	1st
2025–26	6	Div. Hon.	1st
2026–27	5	3ª Fed.	

- 1 season in Tercera Federación

== Current squad ==
As of February 2026

Note: Flags indicate national team as defined under FIFA eligibility rules; some limited exceptions apply. Players may hold more than one non-FIFA nationality.

No.	Pos.	Nation	Player
—	GK	ESP	José Romero
—	GK	ESP	Sergio Vázquez
—	DF	ESP	Antonio Valero
—	DF	ESP	David Romero
—	DF	ESP	Dylan González
—	DF	ESP	Godino
—	DF	ESP	Marcos Solís
—	DF	ESP	Pablo López
—	DF	ESP	Raúl Uribe
—	DF	ESP	Sergio Calle
—	MF	ESP	Alejandro Vázquez
—	MF	ESP	Emilio Benítez

No.	Pos.	Nation	Player
—	MF	ESP	Francisco Diego Pérez
—	MF	ESP	Gonzalo Ballesteros
—	MF	ESP	José Antonio Hernández
—	MF	ESP	Rodrigo Márquez
—	FW	ESP	Davilillo
—	FW	ESP	Iker Amores
—	FW	ESP	José Manuel de Puelles
—	FW	ESP	Juan González
—	FW	GHA	Junior
—	FW	ESP	Pablo Martínez
—	FW	ESP	Víctor Tellado
