= Los Molinos CF =

Spanish football club

Los Molinos
- Full name: Los Molinos Club de Fútbol
- Founded: 1973
- Ground: Constantino Cortés Fortes, Almería, Andalusia, Spain
- Capacity: 400
- Chairman: (Spain) José Luis Povedano
- Manager: (Spain) José Antonio
- League: Segunda Andaluza Almería
- 2024–25: Segunda Andaluza Almería, 8th of 12
Home colours	Away colours

Los Molinos Club de Fútbol is a Spanish football team based in Almería, in the autonomous community of Andalusia. Founded in 1973, it plays in Segunda Andaluza Almería, holding home matches at Complejo Deportivo Municipal de Los Molinos, commonly known as Constantino Cortés Fortes, with a capacity of 400 people.

== Season to season ==
Season	Tier	Division	Place	Copa del Rey
1976–77	6	2ª Reg.	7th	
1977–78	7	2ª Reg.	4th	
1978–79	7	2ª Reg.	4th	
1979–80	7	2ª Reg.	3rd	
1980–81	6	1ª Reg.	3rd	
1981–82	6	1ª Reg.	8th	
1982–83	6	1ª Reg.	7th	
1983–84	6	1ª Reg.	1st	
1984–85	6	1ª Reg.	2nd	
1985–86	6	1ª Reg.	5th	
1986–87	5	Reg. Pref.	8th	
1987–88	5	Reg. Pref.	4th	
1988–89	5	Reg. Pref.	8th	
1989–90	5	Reg. Pref.	9th	
1990–91	5	Reg. Pref.	9th	
1991–92	5	Reg. Pref.	5th	
1992–93	5	Reg. Pref.	3rd	
1993–94	5	Reg. Pref.	2nd	
1994–95	5	Reg. Pref.	5th	
1995–96	5	Reg. Pref.	7th	

Season	Tier	Division	Place	Copa del Rey
1996–97	5	Reg. Pref.	5th	
1997–98	5	Reg. Pref.	3rd	
1998–99	5	Reg. Pref.	8th	
1999–2000	5	Reg. Pref.	13th	
2000–01	5	Reg. Pref.	13th	
2001–02	5	Reg. Pref.	10th	
2002–03	5	Reg. Pref.	10th	
2003–04	5	Reg. Pref.	10th	
2004–05	6	Reg. Pref.	11th	
2005–06	6	Reg. Pref.	6th	
2006–07	6	Reg. Pref.	11th	
2007–08	6	Reg. Pref.	13th	
2008–09	6	Reg. Pref.	4th	
2009–10	6	Reg. Pref.	1st	
2010–11	5	1ª And.	2nd	
2011–12	5	1ª And.	7th	
2012–13	5	1ª And.	2nd	
2013–14	4	3ª	16th	
2014–15	4	3ª	20th	
2015–16	5	1ª And.	16th	

Season	Tier	Division	Place	Copa del Rey
2016–17	DNP			
2017–18	7	2ª And.	2nd	
2018–19	6	1ª And.	12th	
2019–2024	DNP			
2024–25	8	2ª And.	8th	
2025–26	8	2ª And.	4th	

- 2 seasons in Tercera División
