= Romería del Socorro =

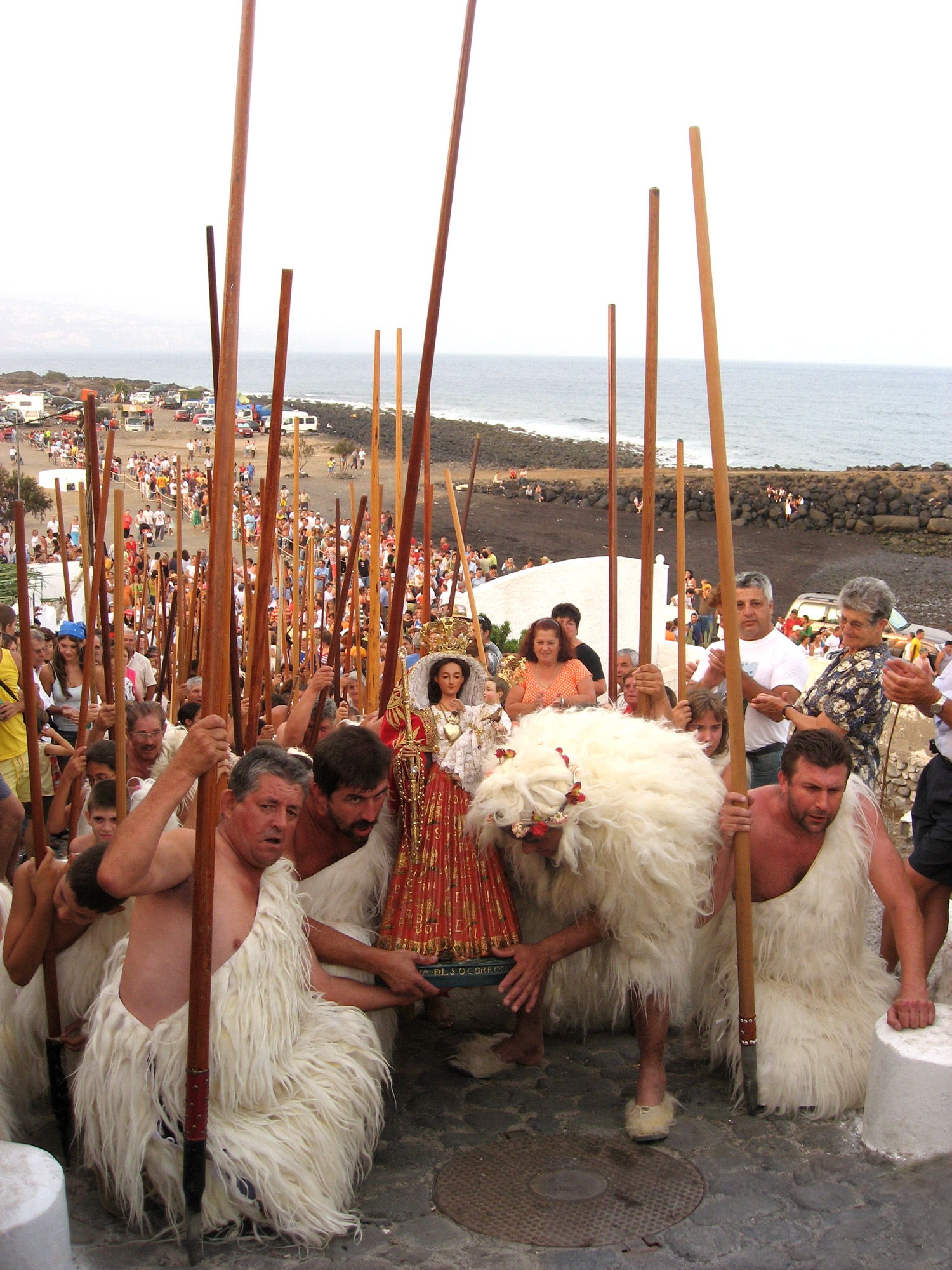
Dramatization of the apparition of the Virgin in Güímar.

The Romería de la Bajada de la Virgen del Socorro, is a romeria of popular character that is held in September in the town of Güímar in Tenerife (Canary Islands, Spain). This festival also declared Regional Tourist Interest. It is considered the oldest romeria of Canary Islands is also one of the most popular.

This festival is dedicated to the Our Lady of Help (Virgen del Socorro), which is on the island a derivation of the invocation of the Virgin of Candelaria. This is because recounts the legend that when the mencey (Guanche king) tried to pick up the image of the Virgin of Candelaria after its discovery, the size experienced a great weight and had to ask for help or assistance to transport it to its cave-palace.

The romeria is a huge procession in which he moved to the Virgin of Help from the Church of Saint Peter of Güímar to the coast in the place where the original image of the Virgin of Candelaria was found. On the coast a theatrical performance of the discovery of the image is performed. This festival is held every year between 7 and 8 September.
