= CD Español del Alquián =

Spanish football club

Español del Alquián
- Full name: Club Deportivo Español del Alquián
- Founded: 1955
- Ground: Los Pinos; El Alquián, Almería, Andalusia, Spain
- Capacity: 3,000
- President: (Spain) Pedro Soler
- Head coach: (Spain) Pepe Guirado
- League: Primera Andaluza Almería
- 2024–25: Segunda Andaluza Almería, 4th of 12 (promoted)
Home colours	Away colours

Club Deportivo Español del Alquián is a Spanish football team based in El Alquián, in the autonomous community of Andalusia. Founded in 1955, it plays in Primera Andaluza Almería, holding home matches at Complejo Deportivo Municipal Los Pinos, with a capacity of 3,000 people.

== Season to season ==
Season	Tier	Division	Place	Copa del Rey
1955–1965	—	Regional	—	
1965–66	4	1ª Reg.	10th	
1966–67	4	1ª Reg.	7th	
1967–68	4	1ª Reg.		
1968–69	4	1ª Reg.		
1969–70	4	1ª Reg.		
1970–71	5	2ª Reg.	7th	
1971–72	5	2ª Reg.	12th	
1972–73	5	2ª Reg.	9th	
1973–74	5	2ª Reg.	3rd	
1974–75	5	2ª Reg.	15th	
1975–76	6	2ª Reg.	4th	
1976–77	6	2ª Reg.	1st	
1977–78	7	2ª Reg.	6th	
1978–79	7	2ª Reg.	5th	
1979–80	7	2ª Reg.	2nd	
1980–81	6	1ª Reg.	12th	
1981–82	6	1ª Reg.	9th	
1982–83	6	1ª Reg.	14th	
1983–84	6	1ª Reg.	4th	

Season	Tier	Division	Place	Copa del Rey
1984–85	5	Reg. Pref.	18th	
1985–86	6	1ª Reg.	9th	
1986–87	6	1ª Reg.	3rd	
1987–88	5	Reg. Pref.	6th	
1988–89	5	Reg. Pref.	11th	
1989–90	5	Reg. Pref.	7th	
1990–91	5	Reg. Pref.	14th	
1991–92	5	Reg. Pref.	16th	
1992–93	6	1ª Reg.	5th	
1993–94	6	1ª Reg.	1st	
1994–95	5	Reg. Pref.	13th	
1995–96	5	Reg. Pref.	12th	
1996–97	5	Reg. Pref.	11th	
1997–98	5	Reg. Pref.	17th	
1998–99	6	1ª Reg.	1st	
1999–2000	5	Reg. Pref.	16th	
2000–01	6	1ª Reg.	1st	
2001–02	5	Reg. Pref.	12th	
2002–03	5	Reg. Pref.	13th	
2003–04	5	Reg. Pref.	9th	

Season	Tier	Division	Place	Copa del Rey
2004–05	6	Reg. Pref.	13th	
2005–06	6	Reg. Pref.	9th	
2006–07	6	Reg. Pref.	2nd	
2007–08	5	1ª And.	15th	
2008–09	5	1ª And.	3rd	
2009–10	5	1ª And.	5th	
2010–11	5	1ª And.	4th	
2011–12	5	1ª And.	4th	
2012–13	5	1ª And.	1st	
2013–14	4	3ª	12th	
2014–15	4	3ª	13th	
2015–16	4	3ª	(R)	
2016–17	DNP			
2017–18	7	2ª And.	4th	
2018–19	DNP			
2019–20	7	2ª And.	5th	
2020–21	DNP			
2021–22	7	1ª And.	8th	
2022–23	7	1ª And.	(R)	
2023–24	DNP			

Season	Tier	Division	Place	Copa del Rey
2024–25	8	2ª And.	4th	
2025–26	7	1ª And.		

- 3 seasons in Tercera División
