= Santa Cruz de La Palma =

Santa Cruz de la Palma
- Municipality
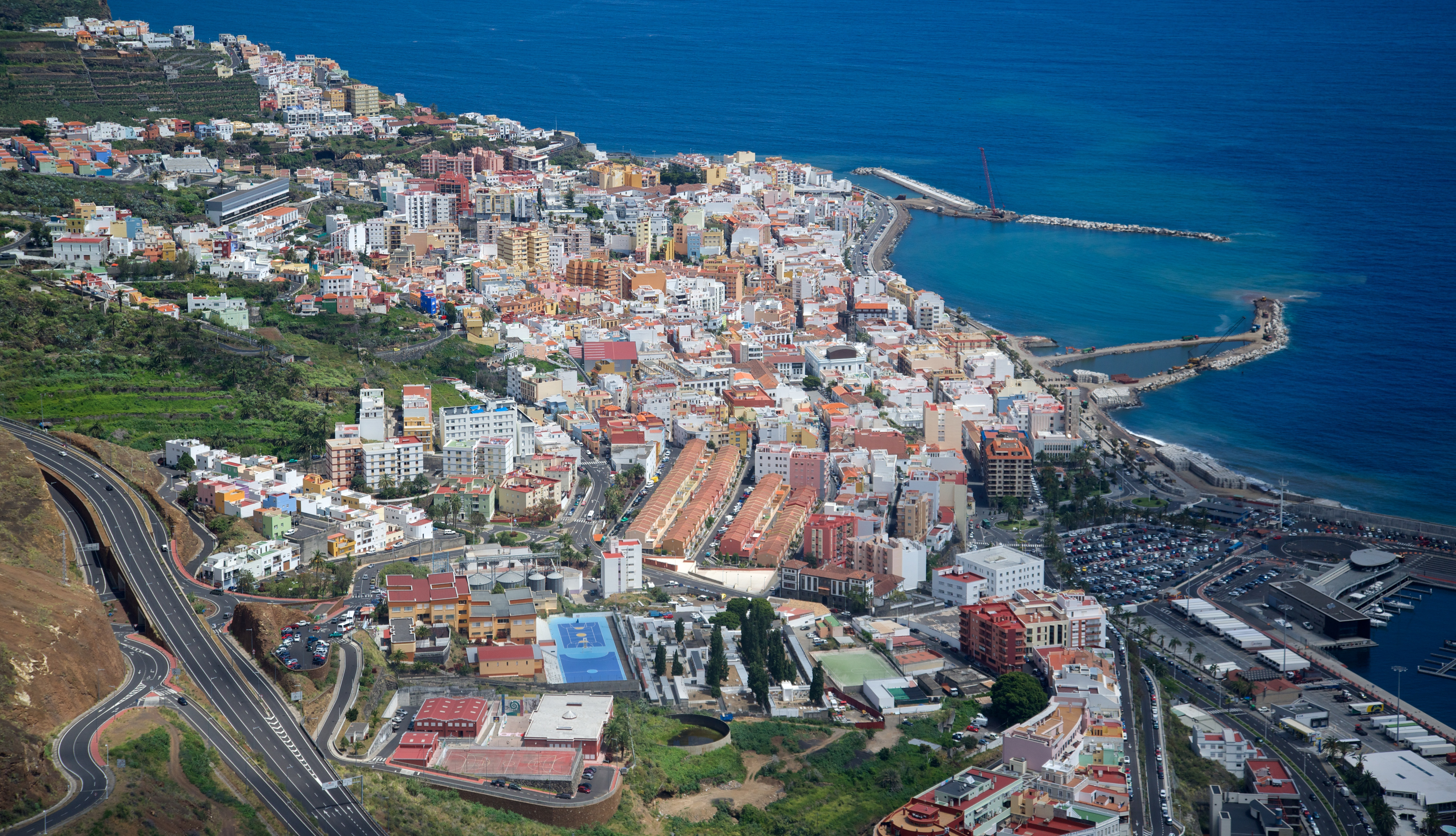
- Santa Cruz de La Palma

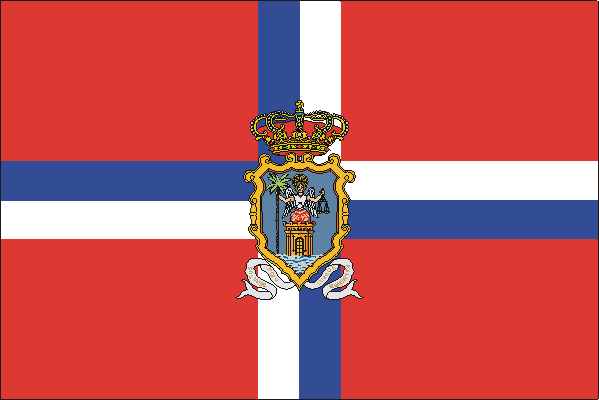
- Flag Coat of arms
- Location of Santa Cruz de La Palma
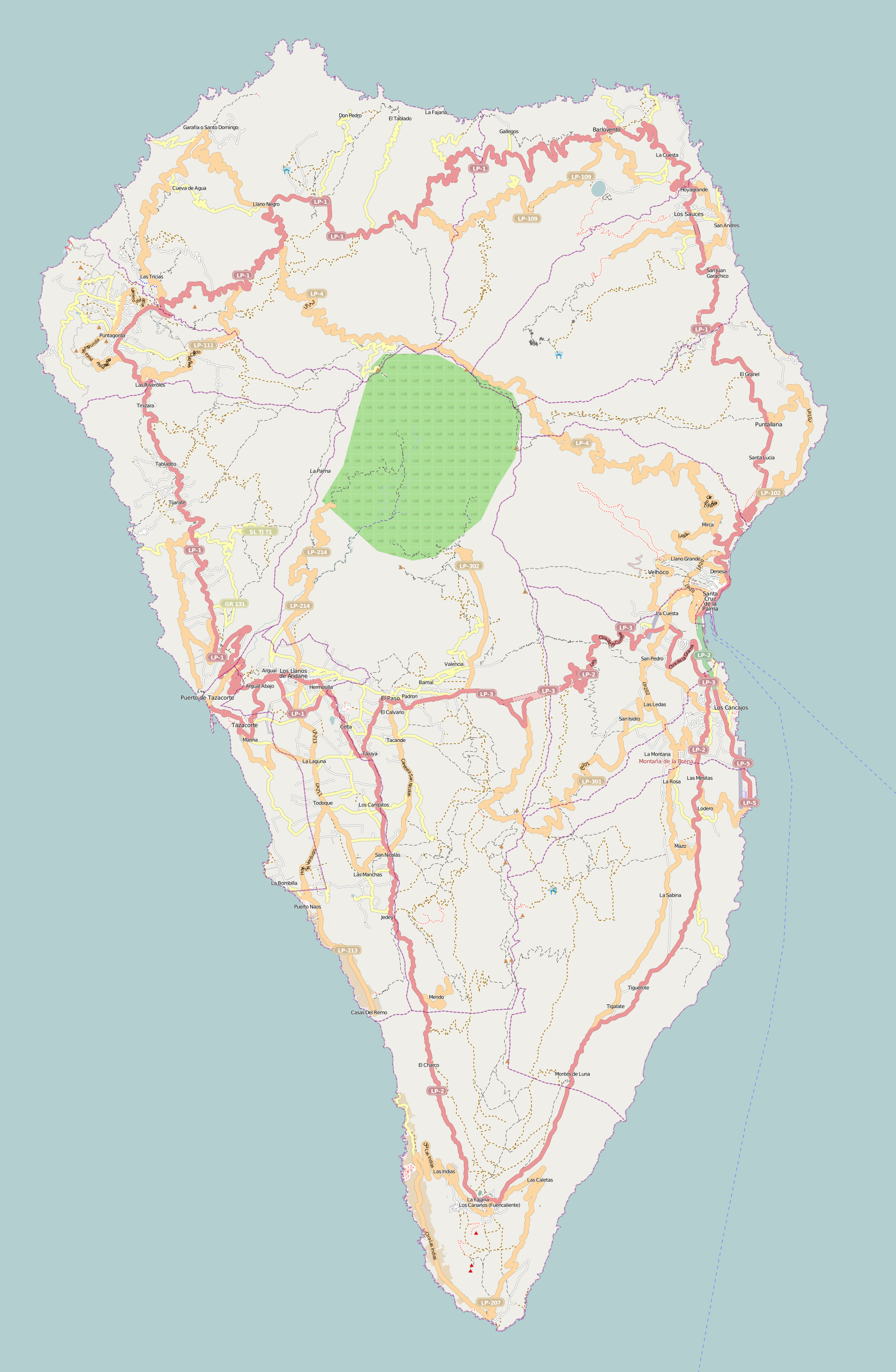
- Location within La Palma Location within Canary Islands Location within Spain, Canary Islands
- Coordinates: 28°40′57″N 17°45′54″W
- Country: Spain
- Autonomous community: Canary Islands
- Province: Santa Cruz de Tenerife
- Island: La Palma
- Founded: 3 May 1493

Government
  - Alcalde: Juan José Neris Hernández (PSOE)

Area
  - Total: 43.38 km^{2} (16.75 sq mi)
- Elevation: 4 m (13 ft)

Population (2025-01-01)
  - Total: 15,690
  - Density: 361.7/km^{2} (936.8/sq mi)
- Demonym: Santacrucero/ra
- Time zone: WET
  - Summer (DST): WEST
- Postal code: 38700
- Official language(s): Spanish
- Website: Official website

Santa Cruz de la Palma (Spanish pronunciation: [ˈsanta ˈkɾuθ ðe la ˈpalma]; literally Holy Cross of La Palma) is a city and a municipality on the east coast of the island of La Palma in the province of Santa Cruz de Tenerife of the Canary Islands. Santa Cruz de la Palma is the second-largest city (after Los Llanos de Aridane) and is the capital of the island. It is along an old lava flow coming from the Caldereta (small caldera), a volcano just south of the city. Santa Cruz de La Palma has the privilege of having the first democratically elected town hall in Spain.

The population of the municipality is 16,330 (2013), its area is 43.38 km^{2}. Around 13,000 people live within the city limits, with the remaining population residing in other settlements.

== History ==
The city was founded by Alonso Fernández de Lugo on May 3, 1493. It was located between a river which is situated by a cave named Tedote (now Cueva de Carías, located north of the city). The city, originally called Villa del Apurón, served as a port that connected routes to the Americas, exporting goods from the island such as sugarcane. The city was sacked by pirates and was later reconstructed and fortified against future pirate attacks. Famous fortifications include the Castillo de Santa Catalina and Castillo de la Virgen. The economic crisis that affected the agriculture sector brought the greatest loss of population in the city's history, which limited its expansion and caused the population to stabilize and drop to 11,000. The population did not approach its original 18,000 again for the next hundred years.

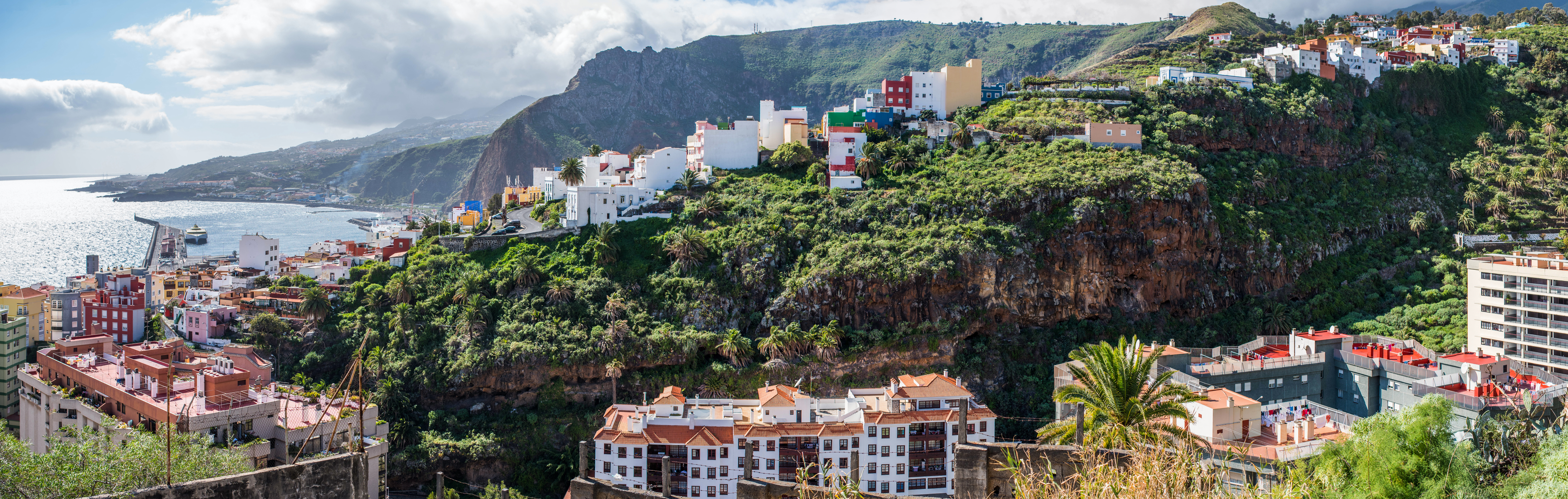
Mountain view of Santa Cruz looking south.
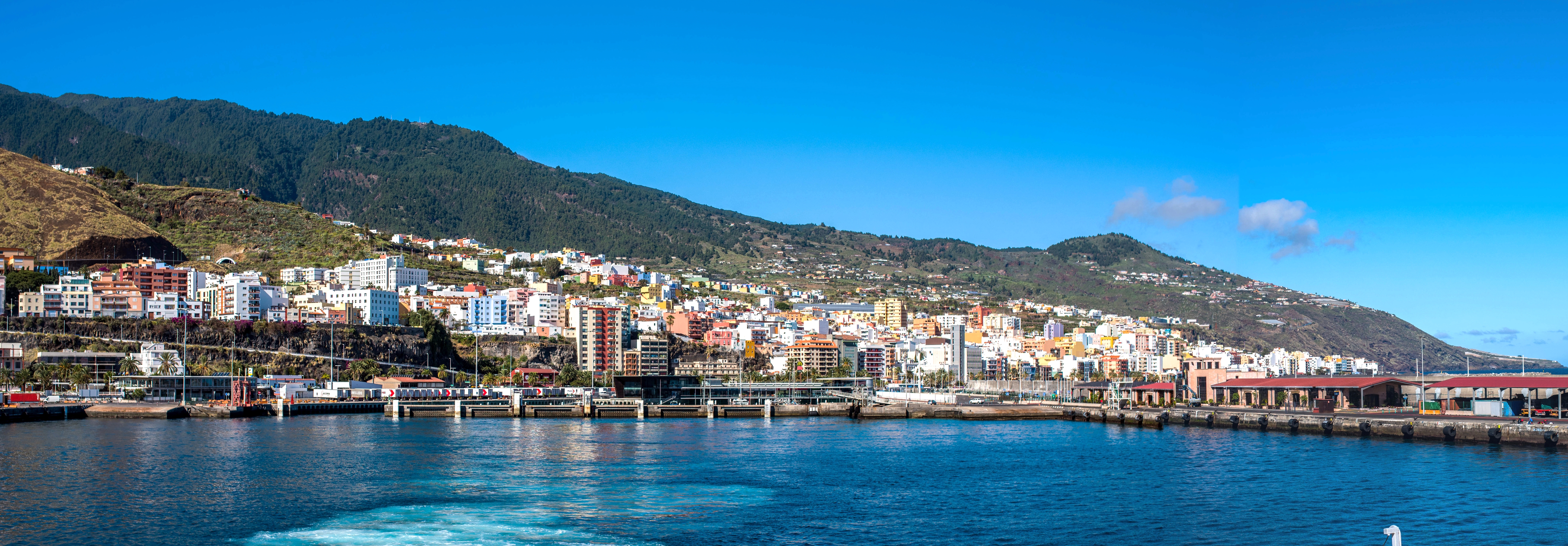
Panorama of Santa Cruz harbor.
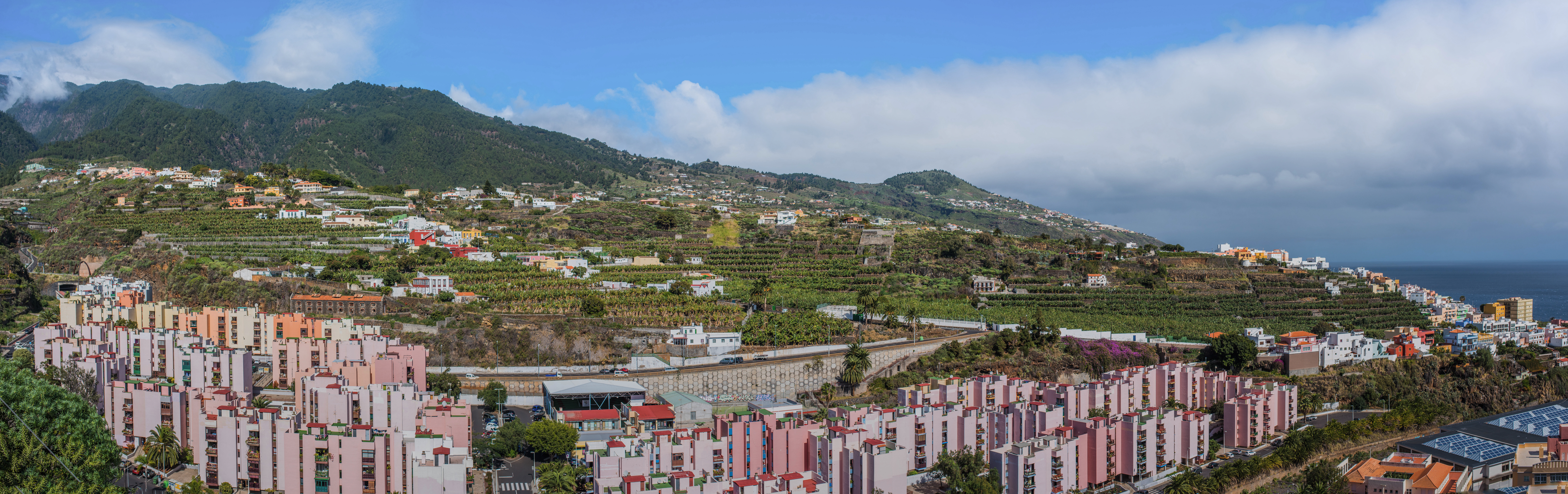
Panorama of Santa Cruz expansion to the north.

== Climate ==
Santa Cruz de la Palma has a hot semi-arid climate (Köppen BSh) featuring very warm, almost rainless summers from April to September, and warm, rainier winters from October to March.

Climate data for La Palma Airport 33m (1981-2010); 8 kilometres (5.0 mi) from the city.
Month	Jan	Feb	Mar	Apr	May	Jun	Jul	Aug	Sep	Oct	Nov	Dec	Year
Record high °C (°F)	27.0 (80.6)	31.0 (87.8)	32.8 (91.0)	36.6 (97.9)	32.4 (90.3)	29.4 (84.9)	38.4 (101.1)	38.0 (100.4)	36.8 (98.2)	34.4 (93.9)	31.6 (88.9)	28.0 (82.4)	38.4 (101.1)
Mean daily maximum °C (°F)	20.6 (69.1)	20.7 (69.3)	21.2 (70.2)	21.6 (70.9)	22.6 (72.7)	24.1 (75.4)	25.5 (77.9)	26.3 (79.3)	26.6 (79.9)	25.5 (77.9)	23.5 (74.3)	21.8 (71.2)	23.3 (74.0)
Daily mean °C (°F)	18.1 (64.6)	18.0 (64.4)	18.5 (65.3)	18.9 (66.0)	20.0 (68.0)	21.7 (71.1)	23.1 (73.6)	23.9 (75.0)	24.0 (75.2)	22.8 (73.0)	20.9 (69.6)	19.3 (66.7)	20.8 (69.4)
Mean daily minimum °C (°F)	15.5 (59.9)	15.3 (59.5)	15.7 (60.3)	16.2 (61.2)	17.4 (63.3)	19.2 (66.6)	20.7 (69.3)	21.4 (70.5)	21.3 (70.3)	20.2 (68.4)	18.3 (64.9)	16.7 (62.1)	18.2 (64.7)
Record low °C (°F)	9.4 (48.9)	10.9 (51.6)	10.2 (50.4)	10.0 (50.0)	11.0 (51.8)	15.2 (59.4)	14.9 (58.8)	16.7 (62.1)	16.4 (61.5)	15.3 (59.5)	10.0 (50.0)	10.0 (50.0)	9.4 (48.9)
Average rainfall mm (inches)	49 (1.9)	57 (2.2)	33 (1.3)	19 (0.7)	7 (0.3)	2 (0.1)	1 (0.0)	1 (0.0)	12 (0.5)	41 (1.6)	70 (2.8)	80 (3.1)	372 (14.5)
Average rainy days	5	4	4	3	1	0	0	0	2	5	7	8	40
Mean monthly sunshine hours	141	146	177	174	192	188	222	209	187	175	140	138	2,106
Source: Agencia Estatal de Meteorología

== Culture ==
The main Catholic church is the Iglesia de El Salvador, founded in 1500.

== Tourism ==
Santa Cruz de la Palma has the only major port in the island, serving ferry routes to Cádiz in Spain, as well as to Tenerife, Gran Canaria and Lanzarote. The main ferry operators in the port are Naviera Armas, Fred. Olsen Express, and Trasmediterránea. Many cruise line firms visit the port. Air travel to and from the island is served by La Palma Airport which provides flights to mainland Spain and other European destinations.

In Las Nieves is the Real Santuario Insular de las Virgen de las Nieves, the patron saint of the island of La Palma.

== Media ==
- El Apurón : elapuron.com

== Sport ==
The football SD Tenisca rivalry with CD Mensajero is the most important derby of the island of La Palma. One of these games, played in 1983, was considered one of the most violent in the history of Spanish football.

== Demographics ==
Population breakdown according to the Continuous Registry by Population Unit of the INE.

Núcleos	Inhabitants (2012)
Barranco de la Madera	84
Barranco del Río	39
Candelaria	54
Cuesta del Llano de la Cruz	199
El Dorador	11
El Frontón	5
El Morro	59
El Planto	121
El Pocito	109
Juan Mayor	180
La Portada	67
La Verada	62
Las Lajitas	9
Las Nieves	14
Las Tierritas	118
Las Toscas	67
Llano Grande	98
Lomo de los Gomeros	9
Lomo del Centro	231
Lomo Espanta	136
Los Álamos	149
Mirca	1040
Roque de Arriba	84
Santa Cruz de La Palma	13608
Velhoco	152

== Historical population ==
Year	Population
Late-19th century	around 18,000
1900	11,000
1991	17,205
1996	17,265
2001	17,265
2002	18,228
2003	18,201
2004	17,857
2008	17,132
2013	16,330
2023	15,441

== People ==
- Manolo Blahnik, shoemaker

== See also ==
- Holy Week in Santa Cruz de La Palma
- List of municipalities in Santa Cruz de Tenerife
