= SD Tenisca =

Tenisca
- Full name: Sociedad Deportiva Tenisca
- Founded: 1922
- Ground: Virgen de Las Nieves, Santa Cruz, Canary Islands, Spain
- Capacity: 5,500
- President: Omar San Blas Concepción
- Head coach: Javier Vales
- League: Tercera Federación – Group 12
- 2024–25: Interinsular Preferente, 1st of 21 (champions)
Home colours	Away colours

Sociedad Deportiva Tenisca is a Spanish football team club from the city of Santa Cruz de La Palma, on the island of La Palma (Canary Islands). It was founded in 1922 and currently plays in Tercera Federación – Group 12, holding home games at Estadio Virgen de las Nieves, with a 5,500-seat capacity.

== History ==
Tenisca is the oldest club the island of La Palma that still exists. It is also the club with more consecutive seasons in Tercera División – Group 12 the only one in Spain that played every season in the last format of Tercera División.

Its rivalry with CD Mensajero is the most important derby of the island of La Palma. One of these games, played in 1983, was considered one of the most violents in the history of Spanish football.

In the 2016–17 season the club finished 11th in the Tercera División, Group 12.

== Season to season ==
Season	Tier	Division	Place	Copa del Rey
1948–49	5	2ª Reg.	2nd	
1949–50	5	2ª Reg.	2nd	
1950–51	5	2ª Reg.		
1951–52	5	2ª Reg.	1st	
1952–53	5	2ª Reg.	3rd	
1953–54	4	1ª Reg.	4th	
1954–55	4	1ª Reg.	3rd	
1955–56	4	1ª Reg.	1st	
1956–57	4	1ª Reg.	1st	
1957–58	4	1ª Reg.	3rd	
1958–59	4	1ª Reg.	2nd	
1959–60	4	1ª Reg.	1st	
1960–61	4	1ª Reg.	2nd	
1961–62	4	1ª Reg.	1st	
1962–63	4	1ª Reg.	2nd	
1963–64	4	1ª Reg.	8th	
1964–65	4	1ª Reg.	1st	
1965–66	4	1ª Reg.	4th	
1966–67	4	1ª Reg.	4th	
1967–68	4	1ª Reg.	11th	

Season	Tier	Division	Place	Copa del Rey
1968–69	5	2ª Reg.	1st	
1969–70	4	1ª Reg.	5th	
1970–71	4	1ª Reg.	4th	
1971–72	4	1ª Reg.	3rd	
1972–73	4	1ª Reg.	2nd	
1973–74	4	Reg. Pref.	2nd	
1974–75	4	Reg. Pref.	5th	
1975–76	4	Reg. Pref.	9th	
1976–77	4	Reg. Pref.	5th	
1977–78	5	Reg. Pref.	3rd	
1978–79	5	Reg. Pref.	1st	
1979–80	4	3ª	16th	Second round
1980–81	4	3ª	7th	
1981–82	4	3ª	4th	
1982–83	4	3ª	6th	First round
1983–84	4	3ª	9th	Second round
1984–85	4	3ª	10th	
1985–86	4	3ª	4th	
1986–87	4	3ª	6th	Second round
1987–88	4	3ª	3rd	First round

Season	Tier	Division	Place	Copa del Rey
1988–89	4	3ª	3rd	
1989–90	4	3ª	13th	
1990–91	4	3ª	11th	
1991–92	4	3ª	9th	
1992–93	4	3ª	8th	
1993–94	4	3ª	4th	
1994–95	4	3ª	10th	
1995–96	4	3ª	7th	
1996–97	4	3ª	1st	
1997–98	4	3ª	14th	
1998–99	4	3ª	10th	
1999–2000	4	3ª	13th	
2000–01	4	3ª	2nd	
2001–02	4	3ª	15th	
2002–03	4	3ª	16th	
2003–04	4	3ª	4th	
2004–05	4	3ª	1st	
2005–06	4	3ª	12th	Third round
2006–07	4	3ª	15th	
2007–08	4	3ª	6th	

Season	Tier	Division	Place	Copa del Rey
2008–09	4	3ª	2nd	
2009–10	4	3ª	10th	First round
2010–11	4	3ª	9th	
2011–12	4	3ª	2nd	
2012–13	4	3ª	13th	
2013–14	4	3ª	8th	
2014–15	4	3ª	14th	
2015–16	4	3ª	4th	
2016–17	4	3ª	11th	
2017–18	4	3ª	11th	
2018–19	4	3ª	16th	
2019–20	4	3ª	2nd	
2020–21	4	3ª	2nd / 4th	
2021–22	5	3ª RFEF	14th	
2022–23	6	Int. Pref.	5th	
2023–24	6	Int. Pref.	3rd	
2024–25	6	Int. Pref.	1st	
2025–26	5	3ª Fed.		

- 42 seasons in Tercera División
- 2 seasons in Tercera Federación/Tercera División RFEF

== Club details ==
- Seasons in Segunda División B: 0.
- Seasons in Tercera Division: 41.
  - Better position in League: 1st (1996–97 and 2004–05).
  - Worse position in League: 16th (1979–80, 2002–03 and 2018–19).
  - Matches played in league: 1152.
  - Points earned in league: 1493.
  - League games won: 487.
  - Tied for league games: 289.
  - League matches lost: 376.
  - Goals scored in league: 1689.
  - Goals against in league: 1410.
  - Historical classification in Tercera Division:
    - By number of seasons: 103 º (1 º de Canarias).
    - By number of points: 56 º (2 º de Canarias).
  - Major goals obtained:
    - At home: S.D. 8-0 Tenisca U.D. Gáldar (1992–93) and S.D. 8-0 Tenisca C.D. La Oliva (2004–05).
    - Outside: At. Step 1-5 S.D. Tenisca (1996–97).
  - Major goals fitted:
    - At home: S.D. 1-6 Tenisca U.D. Las Palmas At. (1983–84).
    - Outside: C.D. Leganés 9-2 S.D. Tenisca (1979–80).
- Promotions for promotion to Segunda División B played: 9 (1993–94, 1996–97, 2000–01, 2003–04, 2004–05, 2008–09, 2011–12, 2015–16 and 2019–20).
- Promotions for promotion to Segunda División B collected: 0.
- Participations in the Cup: 7 (1979–80, 1982–83, 1983–84, 1986–87, 1987–88, 2005–06 and 2009–10).
- RFEF Cup appearances (national phase): 2 (2002–03, 2009–10)
- Shares in the League Cup Third Division: 1 (1982–83)

== Local derbies ==
Tenisca's most passionate rivalry is with CD Mensajero. This started from the 20s to the present.

Since the reorganisation of the fourth division in 1977, the clubs have met in the league on 37 occasions, with twelve wins for Tenisca and eight wins for Mensajero and 17 draws.
