= Divisiones Regionales de Fútbol in Andalusia =

The Divisiones Regionales de Fútbol in the Community of Andalusia, are organized by the Federación Andaluza de Fútbol:

- División de Honor (Level 6 of the Spanish football pyramid)
- Primera Andaluza (Level 7)
- Segunda Andaluza (Level 8)
- Tercera Andaluza (Level 9)

== División de Honor ==
División de Honor
- Founded: 2016
- Country: Spain
- Number of clubs: 2 groups of 16
- Level on pyramid: 6
- Promotion to: 3ª Federación – Group 9 (for Group 2) and Group 10 (for Group 1)
- Relegation to: 1ª Andaluza
- Website: Official website

The División de Honor stands at the sixth level of Spanish football. All of the clubs are based in the autonomous community of Andalusia.

=== The League ===
Created in 2016, the league consists of two groups organised on a provincial basis (one for Western/Lower Andalusia and the other for Eastern/Upper Andalusia), each consisting of 18 teams. At the end of the season, the champions and runners-up of each group are promoted to the corresponding groups in the Tercera Federación (Group 9 and Group 10) and the third-placed teams playoff for possible promotion. If there any vacancies further in Tercera RFEF, a playoff must take place between teams qualified 3rd to fill possible vacancies. The bottom three teams in each group are relegated to the Primera Andaluza.

=== 2025–26 season teams ===
Group I	Group II
Atlético Espeleño; Atlético Palma del Río; R. Betis C; C. D. Cabecense; Cádiz C. F. C; A. D. Cartaya; C. D. Egabrense; Inter Sevilla; La Palma C. F.; U. B. Lebrijana; U. D. Los Barrios; C. D. Moguer; Montilla C. F.; Racing Portuense; C. D. Rociana; U. P. Viso	Alhaurín de la Torre C. F.; C. P. Almería; Atlético de Marbella; Baeza C. F.; C. D. Benagalbón; C. D. Cantoria; C. D. Casabermeja; Cuevas C. F.; C. P. El Ejido; P. D. Garrucha; Loja C. D.; F. C. Málaga City; U. D. Maracena; C. D. Pizarra Atlético C. F.; C. D. Santa Fe; Villacarrillo C. F.

=== Champions ===
Season	Gr. I	Gr. II
2016–17	Cádiz CF B	Juventud de Torremolinos
2017–18	Xerez Deportivo FC	CD Torreperogil
2018–19	Atlético Antoniano	Atlético Porcuna CF
2019–20	Castilleja CF	CD Alhaurino
2020–21	AD Cartaya	UD Torre del Mar
2021–22	Coria CF	CD Estepona FS
2022–23	La Palma CF	CD Rincón
2023–24	Atlético Onubense	C. P. Mijas Las Lagunas
2024–25	Chiclana CF	CD Alhaurino
2025–26	Real Betis C	C. D. Cantoria

== Primera Andaluza ==
Regional Preferente
- Country: Spain
- Number of clubs: 140; 8 groups
- Level on pyramid: 7
- Promotion to: División de Honor
- Relegation to: 2ª Andaluza
- Website: Official website

Primera Andaluza is the seventh level of competition of the Spanish Football League in Andalusia.

=== The League ===
The Primera Andaluza is played with 140 teams in eight groups of 16-19. At the end of the season, the champions and runners-up are promoted and the 3rd placed teams playoff to fill any vacancies. Four clubs are relegated to Segunda Andaluza except those groups with 17 or 19 teams relegating five clubs.

=== Some teams playing at this level ===
- Écija
- Español del Alquián
- Guadix (Group Granada)
- Ronda (Group Malaga)
- San Roque
- San José
- Jerez Industrial (Group Cádiz)

== Segunda Andaluza ==
Primera Provincial
- Country: Spain
- Number of clubs: 222; 15 groups
- Level on pyramid: 8
- Promotion to: 1ª Andaluza
- Relegation to: 3ª Andaluza
- Website: Official website

Segunda Andaluza is the eighth level of competition of the Spanish Football League in Andalusia.

=== The League ===
The Segunda Andaluza is played with 222 teams in 15 groups of 10-18. At the end of the season, four clubs being promoted to each province's Primera Andaluza group. Four clubs each from Cádiz and Granada and eight clubs from Seville are relegated to Tercera Andaluza.

== Tercera Andaluza ==
Tercera Andaluza
- Country: Spain
- Number of clubs: 107; 7 groups
- Level on pyramid: 9
- Promotion to: Segunda Andaluza
- Website: Official website

Tercera Andaluza is the ninth level of competition of the Spanish Football League in Andalusia.

=== The League ===
The Tercera Andaluza is played with 107 teams in 7 groups of 12-16 teams. At the end of the season, in Cádiz and Granada, the top four teams are promoted while the five champions and the best runner-up are promoted in Seville plus two playoff winners between the other four runners-up.

=== Some teams playing at this level ===
- Motril Atlético
- UD Algaida
- Xerez CD B
