= Football records and statistics in Spain =

This page details football records in Spain. Unless otherwise stated, records are taken from Primera División or La Liga. This page also includes records from the Spanish domestic cup competition or Copa del Rey.

== League records ==
=== Segunda División ===
==== All-time table ====
The all-time table is an overall record of all match results, points, and goals of every team that has played in Segunda División since its inception in 1929. The table that follows is accurate as of the end of the 2023–24 season. The table does consider the 1929 Segunda División Grupo B as the second tier.

All-time Segunda División table
Pos	Team	S	GP	Pts	W	D	L	GF	GA	C
1	Sporting de Gijón	51	1634	2189	728	411	495	2626	1940	5
2	CD Tenerife	47	1770	2091	651	484	635	2198	2085	1
3	Real Murcia	54	1710	2002	722	395	593	2511	2213	8
4	Elche CF	40	1470	1827	560	417	493	1859	1748	2
5	Hércules CF	43	1462	1739	614	339	509	2107	1891	3
6	Real Oviedo	41	1448	1719	578	399	471	1995	1669	5
7	Rayo Vallecano	38	1438	1691	569	385	484	1866	1645	1
8	UD Las Palmas	33	1272	1689	499	382	391	1697	1530	4
9	Levante UD (Note: Including Gimnástico FC's participations)	42	1394	1640	529	369	496	1955	1909	2
10	Real Valladolid	38	1260	1633	561	296	403	1915	1537	3
11	Recreativo de Huelva	38	1410	1604	498	415	497	1626	1633	1
12	Cádiz CF	41	1390	1583	549	341	500	1853	1763	1
13	Deportivo de La Coruña	41	1286	1501	564	296	426	1935	1602	5
14	RCD Mallorca	37	1276	1500	527	317	432	1772	1556	2
15	Córdoba CF	33	1244	1498	441	329	474	1552	1565	1
16	CE Sabadell FC	44	1416	1492	540	351	525	2015	2005	2
17	Deportivo Alavés	38	1284	1484	477	331	476	1657	1690	4
18	CD Castellón (Note: Successor to CD Castellón (1922–1934))	38	1354	1403	492	339	523	1661	1749	2
19	CA Osasuna	38	1192	1376	489	254	449	1767	1633	4
20	SD Eibar	29	1134	1366	371	378	385	1197	1231	1
21	Racing de Santander	37	1234	1354	497	280	457	1748	1632	2
22	UD Salamanca (Note: Predecessor of Salamanca CF UDS)	34	1162	1318	422	300	440	1534	1533	0
23	FC Barcelona B (Note: Including CD Condal's participations)	33	1212	1294	425	321	466	1743	1712	0
24	RC Celta de Vigo	32	1032	1293	466	260	306	1629	1142	3
25	Albacete Balompié	26	1042	1290	348	305	389	1182	1289	1
26	Real Zaragoza (Note: Including Iberia SC's participations)	30	972	1270	405	260	307	1515	1247	1
27	Real Madrid Castilla	33	1190	1261	443	287	460	1671	1686	1
28	Granada CF	34	1066	1231	462	228	376	1577	1205	4
29	CD Numancia	21	860	1147	301	264	295	1078	1074	1
30	Real Betis	28	882	1143	418	217	247	1461	1066	7
31	Racing de Ferrol	35	1096	1088	380	243	473	1522	1797	0
32	Xerez CD	25	968	1082	316	273	379	1133	1280	1
33	CD Málaga	31	936	1048	409	230	297	1533	1142	3
34	Girona FC	24	784	1020	317	184	283	1111	1049	0
35	UE Lleida	24	864	955	322	206	336	1120	1129	1
36	UD Almería	16	745	952	252	196	216	847	741	1
37	Gimnàstic de Tarragona	22	838	945	279	224	335	979	1116	0
38	CD Leganés	17	698	909	233	231	234	763	762	1
39	Barakaldo CF	31	868	789	310	169	389	1279	1482	0
40	CD Badajoz (Note: Including CD Badajoz (19{05/36}-2012)'s participations)	20	724	781	238	200	286	845	963	0
41	AD Alcorcón	13	546	709	186	151	209	568	625	0
42	SD Huesca	12	504	674	170	164	170	555	539	1
43	CD Logroñés (1940-2009) (Note: Successor to CD Logroño (1925–34))	18	648	669	225	166	257	863	901	0
44	Valencia CF Mestalla	21	652	629	248	133	271	1015	1034	0
45	Real Sociedad	16	444	605	228	94	122	878	553	3
46	Real Jaén	16	552	594	202	143	207	745	734	2
47	CD Lugo	12	500	575	138	168	194	487	616	0
48	Burgos CF (I) (1936-83)	17	582	566	213	140	229	735	786	1
49	CF Extremadura (Note: Predecessor of CD Extremadura)	13	466	551	180	109	177	612	668	0
50	AD Ceuta FC (Note: Including Atlético Tetuán's participations)	17	520	542	226	90	204	786	725	0
51	Sestao SC (Note: Predecessor of Sestao River)	17	584	540	185	160	239	633	744	0
52	Athletic Bilbao B	14	542	520	173	156	213	622	688	0
53	SD Ponferradina	10	420	519	129	132	159	465	536	0
54	CD Mirandés	10	420	517	131	124	165	457	544	0
55	Sevilla FC	13	384	516	183	90	111	614	431	4
56	Terrassa FC	15	514	492	162	133	219	647	777	0
57	Villarreal CF	10	392	478	141	114	137	425	451	0
58	Málaga CF	8	336	475	123	106	107	375	351	1
59	Atlético Madrid B	11	430	460	140	118	172	530	587	0
60	CD Ourense	13	454	437	143	121	190	492	623	0
61	Cultural y Deportiva Leonesa (Note: Successor to Cultural y Deportiva Leonesa (1923–32))	14	444	429	164	90	190	642	716	1
62	UE Sant Andreu	11	396	394	148	98	150	481	511	0
63	SD Indautxu	13	410	390	154	82	174	607	640	0
64	FC Cartagena	7	294	379	103	70	121	334	379	0
65	CD Alcoyano	12	356	373	147	70	139	604	572	3
66	CP Mérida	7	274	367	116	83	75	349	260	2
67	CD Puertollano	11	386	364	136	92	158	437	503	0
68	Polideportivo Ejido	7	294	358	90	88	116	279	332	0
69	UP Langreo (Note: Including CP La Felguera's participations)	13	418	352	136	80	202	478	662	0
70	CD Toledo	7	278	350	101	78	99	305	321	0
71	Getafe CF	7	286	342	84	95	107	299	346	0
72	SD Compostela	7	282	335	97	90	95	332	334	0
73	RCD Espanyol	6	228	333	112	68	48	343	185	2
74	Pontevedra CF	9	314	328	117	84	113	379	372	2
75	CF Badalona	14	356	286	114	58	184	538	744	0
76	CD San Fernando	10	312	284	116	52	144	426	535	0
77	UE Figueres	7	272	279	98	83	91	320	313	0
78	Granada 74 CF (Note: Including Ciudad de Murcia's participations)	5	210	276	69	69	72	250	265	0
79	Algeciras CF	9	314	271	96	73	145	336	434	0
80	Cartagena FC	8	294	258	85	88	121	325	425	0
81	Villarreal CF B	5	210	257	69	50	91	247	300	0
82	Real Avilés CF (1903–1983)	11	286	255	98	59	129	460	565	0
83	CE Constància	11	274	243	92	59	123	353	451	0
84	Atlético Madrid	6	154	242	84	30	40	297	211	1
85	Burgos CF	4	168	220	56	52	60	157	167	0
86	RCD Córdoba	9	232	214	85	44	103	409	468	0
87	Caudal Deportivo	7	222	210	83	44	95	336	347	0
88	Palamós CF	6	228	207	66	75	87	226	287	0
89	Gimnástica de Torrelavega (Note: Successor to Gimnástica de Torrelavega (1907–1941))	8	226	204	84	36	106	324	450	0
90	Getafe Deportivo	6	228	201	69	63	96	250	324	0
91	CD Eldense	6	204	192	70	40	94	300	370	0
92	Sevilla Atlético	5	198	182	42	58	94	190	307	0
93	Real Unión	10	214	178	61	44	109	298	448	0
94	Basconia	6	184	164	66	32	86	222	329	0
95	Xerez FC (Note: Predecessor to Xerez Deportivo FC)	8	156	163	66	31	59	271	282	0
96	Linares CF	5	190	163	53	57	80	174	254	0
97	Real Balompédica Linense	6	178	155	64	27	87	310	416	0
98	Ontinyent CF	5	174	151	56	39	79	179	213	0
99	CF Fuenlabrada	3	126	147	33	48	45	131	151	0
100	Real Burgos CF	4	152	146	48	50	54	152	176	1
101	Palencia CF (1960)	4	152	140	48	44	60	154	169	0
102	CE Europa	5	150	140	53	34	63	160	208	0
103	SD Ceuta	7	148	134	55	24	69	238	288	0
104	Atlético Malagueño	3	126	133	31	40	55	121	175	0
105	Alicante CF	4	158	133	49	27	82	167	223	0
106	CA Marbella	4	152	132	44	40	68	155	199	0
107	Valencia CF	4	98	120	51	18	29	177	135	2
108	Cartagena CF	7	156	119	44	31	81	247	353	0
109	UD Melilla	4	118	117	50	17	51	214	239	0
110	CF Reus Deportiu	3	126	107	30	38	58	78	119	0
111	Lorca Deportiva CF (2002–15) (Note: Successor to Lorca CF (1986–2002))	2	84	106	28	22	34	93	99	0
112	UD España	3	90	103	45	13	32	171	148	0
113	Real Sociedad B	3	102	103	34	25	43	154	155	0
114	FC Andorra	2	84	102	27	21	36	80	90	0
115	Melilla CF	4	120	102	36	30	54	120	165	0
116	CF Badalona Futur	2	84	101	27	20	35	85	95	0
117	CD Atlético Baleares	4	120	101	42	17	61	180	235	0
118	CD Guadalajara	2	84	99	26	31	37	96	128	0
119	Real Avilés Industrial CF (Note: Including CD Ensidesa's participations)	2	114	98	30	38	46	97	139	0
120	Extremadura UD	2	84	96	24	24	36	86	106	0
121	Arenas Club de Getxo	6	104	89	37	15	52	167	239	0
122	SD Amorebieta	2	84	88	20	28	36	81	116	0
123	UD Huesca	3	92	87	36	15	41	157	165	0
124	UD Ibiza	2	84	86	19	29	36	86	125	0
125	UD Orensana	3	92	82	33	16	43	157	165	0
126	Écija Balompié	2	76	75	19	18	39	61	124	0
127	SG Lucense	3	92	74	28	18	46	135	197	0
128	AD Almería	2	76	73	27	23	26	89	87	1
129	CE L'Hospitalet	3	90	72	31	10	49	124	170	0
130	Orihuela Deportiva CF	2	68	69	24	21	23	97	114	0
131	Elche CF Ilicitano	2	76	64	23	18	35	96	117	0
132	CD Castellón (1922–1934)	4	70	60	26	8	36	119	151	0
133	CA Almería	2	60	55	21	13	26	71	98	0
134	UCAM Murcia CF	1	42	48	11	15	16	42	51	0
135	RCD Mallorca B	1	42	46	12	10	20	52	64	0
136	CF Rayo Majadahonda	1	42	45	12	9	21	46	61	0
137	UD Logroñés	1	42	44	11	11	20	28	53	0
138	CD Abarán	2	60	44	16	12	32	58	102	0
139	AD Ferroviaria	3	42	42	17	8	17	76	77	0
140	Cultural y Deportiva Leonesa (1923–1932)	2	36	40	18	4	14	85	72	0
141	Universidad de Las Palmas CF	1	42	39	8	15	19	34	63	0
142	SD Erandio Club	2	44	35	16	3	25	78	116	0
143	UD Vecindario	1	42	34	9	7	26	42	81	0
144	Lorca FC (2003-22)	1	42	33	8	9	25	37	58	0
145	Levante FC	2	28	32	12	8	8	62	40	1
146	AgD Ceuta	1	38	29	11	7	20	33	50	0
147	CF Lorca Deportiva (1969–94) (Note: Predecessor of CF Lorca Deportiva)	1	38	29	10	9	19	23	59	0
148	Deportivo Aragón	1	38	28	9	10	19	35	55	0
149	CD Nacional de Madrid	2	28	27	12	3	13	59	53	0
150	Puente Genil CF	1	38	27	12	3	23	44	81	0
151	UD Alzira	1	38	26	9	8	21	29	58	0
152	CDC Moscardó	1	38	23	6	11	21	22	51	0
153	SD Escoriaza	1	30	21	8	5	17	42	69	0
154	Zaragoza CD	1	18	20	9	2	7	45	41	0
155	Gimnástica de Torrelavega (1907–1941)	1	18	20	8	4	6	35	38	0
156	CD Juvenil	1	30	20	5	10	15	40	85	0
157	CP Cacereño	1	30	19	7	5	18	40	79	0
158	Jerez Industrial CF	1	38	18	6	6	26	36	91	0
159	CE Júpiter	2	26	17	5	7	14	35	57	0
160	Arosa SC	1	30	17	7	3	20	44	84	0
161	RD Oriamendi	1	14	15	7	1	6	28	29	0
162	EC Granollers	1	14	14	6	2	6	31	30	0
163	Imperio FC	1	14	14	6	2	6	32	33	0
164	Racing de Madrid	1	18	13	6	1	11	31	48	0
165	Burjassot CF	1	14	12	5	2	7	38	33	0
166	Tolosa CF	1	18	12	5	2	11	26	46	0
167	CD Villarrobledo	1	30	12	4	4	22	26	79	0
168	CFJ Mollerussa	1	38	11	3	5	30	19	75	0
169	Real Murcia Imperial	1	14	8	3	2	9	17	37	0
170	Unión SC	1	14	7	3	1	10	26	51	0
171	EHA Tánger	1	14	1	0	1	13	15	45	0
172	SC de La Plana	1	14	3	1	1	12	7	43	0
173	CD Logroño (1924-35)	1	3	0	0	0	3	2	20	0

League or status for 2024–25 season
2024–25 La Liga
2024–25 Segunda División
2024–25 Primera Federación
2024–25 Segunda Federación
2024–25 Tercera Federación
2023–24 Divisiones Regionales
Club no longer exists

=== Segunda División B ===
==== All-time table (1977–2021) ====
The all-time table is an overall record of all match results, points, and goals of every team that has played in Segunda División B (third division) since its creation in 1977 and until its last season, 2020–21. The division was replaced by Segunda División RFEF and demoted to fourth tier, after the creation of a new third tier named Primera División RFEF.

All-time Segunda División B table
Pos	Team	S	GP	Pts	W	D	L	GF	GA	GD
1	Barakaldo CF	36	1348	1874	541	411	396	1614	1319	295
2	Cultural y Deportiva Leonesa	36	1342	1847	539	410	393	1692	1392	300
3	UD Melilla	34	1266	1750	484	401	381	1367	1213	154
4	Pontevedra CF	36	1350	1737	521	377	452	1655	1478	177
5	Athletic Bilbao B	31	1156	1679	497	317	342	1616	1187	429
6	Real Sociedad B	35	1312	1639	497	369	446	1620	1418	202
7	Real Jaén CF	31	1176	1563	465	357	354	1404	1118	286
8	Atlético Madrid B	31	1160	1536	462	322	376	1594	1295	299
9	Sevilla Atlético	31	1152	1505	436	337	379	1408	1195	213
10	Lleida Esportiu (Note: Including UE Lleida's participations)	29	1084	1478	448	312	324	1379	1098	281
11	CE L'Hospitalet	31	1170	1476	442	327	401	1512	1349	163
12	CA Osasuna B	33	1232	1476	427	358	447	1347	1380	-33
13	CD Alcoyano	29	1094	1449	441	318	335	1351	1160	191
14	Real Unión	28	1042	1447	402	295	345	1225	1079	146
15	Sporting de Gijón B	31	1154	1388	410	314	430	1365	1422	-57
16	Real Madrid Castilla	22	812	1363	399	207	206	1352	868	484
17	Racing de Ferrol	27	1000	1329	399	273	328	1296	1076	220
18	Gimnàstic de Tarragona	27	1006	1296	391	314	301	1261	1030	231
19	FC Barcelona B	23	852	1265	393	217	242	1280	879	401
20	Zamora CF	25	934	1203	346	266	322	1099	1034	65
21	CD Ourense	24	914	1168	358	273	283	1051	928	123
22	Granada CF	22	836	1152	359	251	226	1102	831	271
23	CD Lugo	23	878	1146	340	257	281	1070	972	98
24	Valencia CF Mestalla	25	930	1136	306	274	350	1167	1171	-4
25	FC Cartagena	19	712	1131	301	228	183	854	663	191
26	CE Sabadell FC	22	826	1101	292	257	277	967	973	-6
27	SD Ponferradina	21	798	1092	320	228	250	984	849	135
28	Deportivo Aragón	24	916	1091	332	243	341	1100	1055	45
29	Real Balompédica Linense	24	888	1074	314	268	306	1008	1006	2
30	Betis Deportivo Balompié	25	934	1071	301	256	377	1126	1191	-65
31	RC Celta de Vigo B	22	810	1056	289	207	314	987	1066	-79
32	Córdoba CF	22	814	1045	333	251	230	1074	855	219
33	Burgos CF	19	696	1027	272	211	213	759	644	115
34	Écija Balompié	21	794	1015	269	247	278	820	885	-65
35	RCD Espanyol B	20	742	1010	266	212	264	968	879	89
36	CF Fuenlabrada	19	722	1008	273	203	246	877	848	29
37	UDA Gramenet	18	684	1004	289	182	213	867	725	142
38	Cádiz CF	16	606	1003	285	162	159	827	532	295
39	Real Avilés CF	23	872	950	290	250	332	991	1086	-95
40	Gimnástica de Torrelavega	21	798	948	259	241	298	768	852	-84
41	Hércules CF	18	662	944	272	210	180	851	625	226
42	SD Lemona	20	760	923	251	264	245	721	726	-5
43	UE Vilajuïga (Note: Including UE Figueres' participations)	18	684	909	263	204	217	876	757	119
44	Talavera CF	19	720	906	255	219	246	824	819	5
45	UE Sant Andreu	19	724	899	272	208	244	896	794	102
46	Real Valladolid Promesas	20	736	899	250	197	289	792	913	-121
47	CF Badalona	17	626	882	225	207	194	656	606	50
48	UD San Sebastián de los Reyes	20	736	876	238	212	286	787	915	-128
49	CD Leganés	16	608	861	255	188	165	764	590	174
50	AD Ceuta	14	530	852	224	180	126	667	475	192
51	Terrassa FC	18	684	850	245	189	250	838	852	-14
52	Benidorm CF	19	722	844	229	246	247	753	809	-56
53	UB Conquense	17	646	836	217	195	234	739	816	-77
54	RCD Mallorca B	18	690	829	219	200	271	807	883	-76
55	Xerez CD	17	642	821	283	169	190	825	638	187
56	CD Badajoz (1905–2012)	18	684	815	291	160	233	862	702	160
57	CP Cacereño	18	682	810	217	207	258	756	810	-54
58	RSD Alcalá	20	760	800	227	242	291	756	890	-134
59	Real Murcia	14	508	799	229	146	133	660	450	210
60	CD Castellón	14	522	784	218	150	154	619	479	140
61	Universidad de Las Palmas CF	12	456	774	218	120	118	579	406	173
62	CD Guijuelo	16	584	774	201	171	212	643	627	16
63	CD Atlético Baleares	16	586	772	216	167	203	693	672	21
64	SD Huesca	18	684	766	230	177	277	749	872	-123
65	FC Andorra	19	700	762	253	204	243	847	845	2
66	Algeciras CF	18	658	760	208	232	218	628	647	-19
67	UP Langreo	19	698	759	236	185	277	763	905	-142
68	CD Mirandés	15	570	751	234	158	178	678	611	67
69	Marbella FC	14	510	726	188	162	160	577	549	28
70	Ontinyent CF	17	648	713	210	166	272	672	814	-142
71	CD Toledo	14	532	701	201	141	190	625	588	37
72	Deportivo Alavés	12	456	688	243	129	84	747	371	376
73	Recreativo de Huelva	14	508	670	199	153	156	589	491	98
74	CF Palencia	14	532	651	176	183	173	524	542	-18
75	UD Logroñés	11	406	648	175	123	108	494	359	135
76	CD Tudelano	15	546	639	165	192	189	565	617	-52
77	CD Izarra	16	586	637	170	177	239	545	708	-163
78	CD Puertollano	13	494	633	203	139	152	633	529	104
79	Levante UD	12	456	614	229	110	117	685	422	263
80	Villarreal CF B	11	396	612	166	114	116	551	428	123
81	Albacete Balompié	11	422	595	205	106	111	613	382	231
82	UD Pájara Playas de Jandía	12	456	595	154	133	169	514	557	-43
83	Mérida AD (Note: Including Mérida UD's participations)	12	432	590	154	128	150	449	457	-8
84	SD Compostela	15	554	581	176	159	219	592	703	-111
85	CF Gandía	13	498	577	167	157	174	563	546	17
86	Amurrio Club	12	456	573	145	145	166	478	510	-32
87	CD Mensajero	12	454	570	166	123	165	552	559	-7
88	Marino de Luanco	14	506	570	146	132	228	479	635	-156
89	AD Ceuta	13	498	567	214	139	145	660	504	156
90	Getafe CF	11	418	563	184	128	106	546	376	170
91	SD Gernika Club	12	456	557	138	153	165	451	522	-71
92	Sestao River Club	11	418	554	141	131	146	438	449	-11
93	Alicante CF	9	342	553	150	103	89	473	311	162
94	Deportivo Fabril	11	418	547	147	116	155	489	502	-13
95	AD Alcorcón	10	380	529	137	118	125	455	431	24
96	Girona FC	13	494	527	170	140	184	623	665	-42
97	Real Oviedo	9	340	526	153	89	98	464	338	126
98	SD Amorebieta	10	358	521	138	107	113	469	422	47
99	CD Logroñés	11	418	515	161	128	129	559	473	86
100	UD Vecindario	10	380	513	136	105	139	450	481	-31
101	Caudal Deportivo	14	530	512	130	150	250	504	732	-228
102	Atlético Levante UD	11	398	508	129	121	148	411	435	-24
103	Coruxo FC	11	394	507	130	117	147	428	497	-69
104	Andorra CF	14	532	500	161	154	217	589	721	-132
105	UD Salamanca	9	346	499	175	100	71	545	303	242
106	CF Villanovense	11	404	499	127	118	159	436	502	-66
107	SD Beasain	10	380	496	134	132	114	437	399	38
108	UD Lanzarote	10	380	493	129	106	145	494	511	-17
109	CD Binéfar	13	494	486	145	148	201	526	641	-115
110	CD Calahorra	11	394	478	126	123	145	431	485	-54
111	UD Las Palmas Atlético	12	434	475	134	125	175	468	540	-72
112	Yeclano CF	11	418	472	149	109	160	467	460	7
113	Racing de Santander	7	252	468	140	70	42	392	193	199
114	CD Olímpic de Xàtiva	11	420	468	147	100	173	440	524	-84
115	Orihuela CF	10	360	466	114	124	122	386	407	-21
116	SD Eibar	7	270	455	143	70	57	382	209	173
117	CD Aurrerá de Vitoria	8	304	455	121	92	91	326	266	60
118	Elche CF	8	304	452	140	99	65	446	274	172
119	Racing Club Portuense	11	418	450	145	123	150	412	459	-47
120	Sestao SC	10	380	442	169	104	107	497	345	152
121	CF Extremadura	9	340	432	131	100	109	451	381	70
122	CD Numancia	9	328	428	141	100	87	424	290	134
123	CD Linares	8	302	426	110	96	96	325	302	23
124	Lucena CF	8	304	424	113	85	106	361	352	9
125	CF Gavà	9	342	424	107	103	132	415	473	-58
126	Real Oviedo B (1921–2003)	11	418	423	123	121	174	446	544	-98
127	CF Reus Deportiu	9	344	422	118	84	142	371	447	-76
128	CD Tenerife	8	308	421	152	79	77	454	281	173
129	CD Guadalajara	7	266	421	116	73	77	345	271	74
130	Deportivo Alavés B	9	322	419	106	101	115	351	370	-19
131	Atlético Sanluqueño CF	11	394	417	125	106	163	376	478	-102
132	Real Ávila CF	11	418	410	120	143	155	447	519	-72
133	Rayo Cantabria	10	380	410	101	114	165	384	499	-115
134	Cartagena FC	9	342	401	151	99	92	413	287	126
135	Polideportivo Ejido	9	338	401	116	94	128	346	382	-36
136	CP Almería	9	346	397	110	107	129	359	393	-34
137	CD San Roque de Lepe	9	340	397	106	104	130	370	434	-64
138	Club Recreativo Granada	8	282	387	101	84	97	348	309	39
139	Novelda CF	8	304	385	98	91	115	319	354	-35
140	CD Eldense	11	418	383	116	113	189	433	603	-170
141	UCAM Murcia CF	7	242	380	102	74	66	279	225	54
142	UE Cornellà	7	244	372	99	75	70	291	254	37
143	CD As Pontes	9	342	364	112	105	125	384	420	-36
144	UD Las Palmas	6	226	362	123	58	45	387	180	207
145	UD Alzira	9	346	357	109	99	138	332	410	-78
146	AEC Manlleu	8	304	355	127	76	101	403	356	47
147	UE Costa Brava	7	246	344	89	77	80	276	255	21
148	Jerez CF	7	264	342	85	87	92	264	253	11
149	Peña Sport FC	10	380	338	77	107	196	314	566	-252
150	Linares CF	8	304	336	121	94	89	375	306	69
151	Bermeo FT	7	266	335	95	77	94	281	307	-26
152	Getafe CF B	8	282	335	89	68	125	317	391	-74
153	San Fernando CD	7	242	332	87	71	84	282	281	1
154	Águilas CF	7	266	325	86	67	113	278	348	-70
155	CF Sporting Mahonés	9	342	323	106	87	149	345	469	-124
156	Rayo Vallecano	5	190	314	90	63	37	263	164	99
157	CD Teruel	8	304	314	87	98	119	311	391	-80
158	UD Almería B	7	266	311	80	71	115	282	347	-65
159	Tomelloso CF	8	304	308	91	105	108	302	326	-24
160	CF Rayo Majadahonda	7	242	307	81	64	97	274	299	-25
161	UD Almería	6	226	306	91	69	66	296	220	76
162	Villajoyosa CF	6	228	300	79	63	86	240	251	-11
163	SD Leioa	7	246	300	76	72	98	275	328	-53
164	UE Olot	7	246	299	70	89	87	251	274	-23
165	Arenas Club de Getxo	7	244	298	74	86	84	263	286	-23
166	Motril CF	6	226	293	78	59	89	239	275	-36
167	CD Díter Zafra	8	304	291	82	89	133	287	395	-108
168	Real Madrid CF C	6	228	290	88	53	87	359	328	31
169	CD Ebro	6	206	286	68	82	56	194	203	-9
170	CD Basconia	8	304	284	94	96	114	309	395	-86
171	CD San Fernando	8	302	280	85	83	134	305	387	-82
172	Huracán Valencia CF	5	192	263	75	63	54	203	160	43
173	UD Poblense	8	296	261	85	85	126	313	394	-81
174	CD Dénia	5	190	259	65	64	61	188	187	1
175	La Roda CF	6	228	255	63	66	99	231	280	-49
176	SD Ibiza	8	304	254	84	86	134	276	382	-106
177	Lorca FC	4	152	253	70	43	39	199	146	53
178	Logroñés CF	5	190	253	64	61	65	184	204	-20
179	SCD Durango	7	266	252	76	75	115	233	344	-111
180	CD Alfaro	6	228	248	60	68	100	214	308	-94
181	Lorca Deportiva CF	4	152	246	68	42	42	211	145	66
182	CD Lealtad	6	216	234	57	63	96	204	270	-66
183	CD Alcalá	5	190	231	59	54	77	181	224	-43
184	CA Marbella	6	228	228	79	65	84	234	230	4
185	CD Manchego	5	190	228	56	63	71	175	202	-27
186	Málaga CF	4	152	227	63	46	43	181	133	48
187	CDA Navalcarnero	6	214	227	57	56	101	205	295	-90
188	FC Jumilla	5	190	223	55	58	77	165	226	-61
189	Arosa SC	7	266	221	72	77	117	272	377	-105
190	AD Torrejón CF	6	228	220	87	46	95	292	305	-13
191	Palencia CF	5	190	219	83	53	54	240	192	48
192	CF Lorca Deportiva (1969–1994)	6	228	218	73	72	83	224	247	-23
193	CD Badajoz	4	128	217	61	34	33	170	110	60
194	CD Móstoles	6	228	215	55	70	103	195	311	-116
195	CF Talavera de la Reina	5	166	206	54	44	68	172	201	-29
196	CD Marino	7	252	206	68	61	123	241	381	-140
197	CD Logroñés B	6	228	204	62	66	100	226	308	-82
198	Orihuela Deportiva CF	5	190	202	74	54	62	208	200	8
199	CD Roquetas	4	152	197	52	41	59	170	177	-7
200	CD Lalín	6	228	194	61	63	104	200	295	-95
201	UD Socuéllamos	4	140	193	55	28	57	158	177	-19
202	Rayo Vallecano B	4	152	193	49	46	57	175	200	-25
203	Lorca Atlético CF (Note: Including Sangonera Atlético CF's participations)	4	152	192	48	48	56	173	199	-26
204	UP Plasencia	5	190	188	52	62	76	188	226	-38
205	CD Don Benito	6	202	188	45	62	95	160	252	-92
206	CD Maspalomas	6	226	185	63	59	104	228	301	-73
207	AE Prat	5	172	183	40	63	69	142	190	-48
208	CE Mataró	4	152	181	49	34	69	191	220	-29
209	Córdoba CF B	4	152	179	47	38	67	158	203	-45
210	Extremadura UD	4	138	177	46	39	53	153	157	-4
211	Torrevieja CF	5	190	177	64	49	77	197	245	-48
212	AD Parla	5	190	175	59	57	74	183	244	-61
213	Villarreal CF	4	152	174	61	52	39	207	163	44
214	Granada Atlético CF (Note: Including Guadix CF (1969–2005)'s participations)	4	150	174	43	45	62	148	190	-42
215	Palamós CF	4	152	173	51	43	58	171	204	-33
216	UD Ibiza-Eivissa	3	90	171	50	21	19	118	59	59
217	SCR Peña Deportiva	5	168	170	43	46	79	153	232	-79
218	CD El Ejido 2012	4	140	169	44	37	59	153	176	-23
219	FC Barcelona C	5	190	167	57	43	90	262	322	-60
220	CDC Moscardó	4	152	165	48	44	60	160	201	-41
221	CFJ Mollerussa	4	152	164	64	36	52	215	175	40
222	Granada 74 CF (Note: Including Ciudad de Murcia's participations)	3	114	164	46	26	42	125	124	1
223	Real Aranjuez CF	4	152	163	47	42	63	162	195	-33
224	Galáctico Pegaso	5	190	158	50	58	82	198	264	-66
225	RCD Mallorca	3	114	155	50	35	29	142	106	36
226	CD Estepona	5	188	153	46	61	81	142	233	-91
227	CD Antequerano	4	152	152	61	30	61	162	177	-15
228	SD Noja	4	150	152	37	41	72	152	218	-66
229	Dos Hermanas CF	3	112	148	35	43	34	112	102	10
230	CD Tropezón	4	150	144	34	42	74	124	225	-101
231	UD Fuerteventura	3	114	141	38	27	49	129	161	-32
232	CD Baza	3	114	140	32	44	38	125	129	-4
233	UD Gáldar	3	114	140	35	35	44	125	142	-17
234	Caravaca CF	3	114	139	36	31	47	121	133	-12
235	Montañeros CF	3	114	138	36	30	48	141	165	-24
236	Yeclano Deportivo	4	132	138	34	36	62	138	196	-58
237	Linares Deportivo	3	100	135	35	30	35	107	109	-2
238	UD Telde	4	152	135	48	39	65	174	213	-39
239	Arroyo CP	3	114	131	31	38	45	100	137	-37
240	UD Somozas	3	114	131	34	29	51	108	146	-38
241	UD San Pedro	3	114	131	32	35	47	108	146	-38
242	CD Manacor	5	190	128	43	36	111	170	338	-168
243	CD Santurtzi	4	152	127	42	43	67	132	186	-54
244	UD Fraga	4	152	127	41	45	66	150	240	-90
245	Real Oviedo Vetusta	3	92	126	33	27	32	108	122	-14
246	CE Premià	4	152	126	35	39	78	153	274	-121
247	Internacional de Madrid	3	90	124	32	28	30	113	113	0
248	Coria CF	3	112	124	32	28	52	94	144	-50
249	Unionistas de Salamanca CF	3	90	122	31	29	30	102	97	5
250	CD Corralejo (1975–2004)	3	114	120	32	33	49	102	149	-47
251	CP Mérida	3	114	118	42	34	38	128	120	8
252	Salamanca CF UDS	3	92	118	30	28	34	99	107	-8
253	SD Logroñés	3	98	118	29	31	38	96	135	-39
254	SD Erandio Club	4	152	117	37	43	72	144	232	-88
255	Real Murcia Imperial	2	76	116	31	23	22	86	77	9
256	CD Mármol Macael	3	114	116	34	39	41	108	139	-31
257	Arandina CF	3	114	116	28	32	54	120	177	-57
258	CF Atlético Ciudad	2	76	115	32	19	25	87	82	5
259	Atlético Malagueño	3	114	113	30	23	61	98	162	-64
260	Moralo CP	3	114	111	29	24	61	109	176	-67
261	CE Constància	3	116	110	31	30	55	92	145	-53
262	SD Ejea	3	92	108	26	30	36	81	98	-17
263	CD Elgoibar	3	114	108	31	24	59	101	157	-56
264	Lorca CF	3	114	106	23	37	54	109	173	-64
265	AD Universidad de Oviedo	3	114	106	27	25	62	116	202	-86
266	CD Azkoyen	3	114	105	25	30	59	93	176	-83
267	Gimnástica Segoviana CF	3	114	104	23	35	56	93	167	-74
268	Juventud Cambados	3	114	103	35	33	46	96	117	-21
269	Real Burgos CF	2	80	102	37	28	15	92	52	40
270	AD Cerro de Reyes	3	114	101	26	26	62	93	183	-90
271	Elche CF Ilicitano	2	76	99	26	21	29	98	101	-3
272	Rápido de Bouzas	2	76	99	25	24	27	67	83	-16
273	Castillo CF	2	76	98	23	29	24	60	71	-11
274	Club Portugalete	3	104	97	20	37	47	83	131	-48
275	CF Valdepeñas	3	114	96	31	34	49	100	148	-48
276	Deportivo de La Coruña	2	62	95	36	12	14	92	49	43
277	UD Vall de Uxó	3	114	94	33	28	53	109	159	-50
278	UD Realejos	3	114	93	31	21	62	119	197	-78
279	Unión Estepona CF	2	76	92	22	26	28	85	95	-10
280	CF Peralada	2	76	91	21	28	27	76	78	-2
281	CD Laredo	3	102	91	30	23	49	106	161	-55
282	CD Tenerife B	3	114	91	22	28	64	111	212	-101
283	Atlético Saguntino	2	76	89	22	23	31	77	86	-9
284	UD Ibiza-Eivissa	2	76	88	19	31	26	89	106	-17
285	AD Unión Adarve	2	76	87	22	21	33	85	108	-23
286	CD Fuengirola	3	114	87	29	29	56	80	158	-78
287	CD El Palo	2	76	86	20	26	30	77	90	-13
288	Atlético Astorga FC	2	76	85	20	25	31	94	111	-17
289	RCD Carabanchel	2	76	84	20	24	32	69	105	-36
290	Haro Deportivo	3	92	83	18	29	45	72	118	-46
291	UD Mutilvera	2	64	82	19	25	20	64	67	-3
292	SD Eibar B	2	76	82	20	22	34	60	88	-28
293	CD Villanueva	2	76	81	21	18	37	86	116	-30
294	Vélez CF	2	76	79	18	25	33	88	124	-36
295	CD Vitoria	2	76	78	17	27	32	74	95	-21
296	AD Mar Menor-San Javier	2	76	75	17	24	35	71	105	-34
297	CD Arnedo	2	76	72	25	22	29	88	108	-20
298	UD Villa de Santa Brígida	2	76	72	16	24	36	72	105	-33
299	Zalla UC	2	76	71	16	23	37	67	109	-42
300	CD Leganés B	2	76	71	19	14	43	66	119	-53
301	CF La Nucía	2	54	70	18	16	20	50	57	-7
302	CD Hernani	2	76	67	20	27	29	88	103	-15
303	UD Casetas	2	76	67	17	26	33	80	117	-37
304	Vinaròs CF	2	76	66	26	14	36	99	124	-25
305	CD Cala Millor	2	76	66	22	22	32	84	111	-27
306	Cádiz CF B	2	52	65	17	14	21	50	56	-6
307	Villarrubia CF	2	54	64	14	22	18	58	66	-8
308	CD San Isidro	2	76	64	15	19	42	76	124	-48
309	Zamudio SD	2	76	62	15	17	44	80	151	-71
310	Las Rozas CF	2	54	61	13	22	19	53	60	-7
311	Bergantiños FC	2	76	59	20	19	37	70	100	-30
312	RC Celta de Vigo	1	38	58	23	12	3	76	22	54
313	CD Arenteiro	2	76	58	21	16	39	66	101	-35
314	AD Almería	1	38	56	25	6	7	68	27	41
315	CD Isla Cristina	2	76	56	14	14	48	57	196	-139
316	UD Barbastro	2	76	55	12	24	40	63	117	-54
317	CD Los Boliches	2	76	52	15	22	39	57	127	-70
318	Torrent CF (1922–1993)	2	76	52	14	24	38	62	133	-71
319	CF Lorca Deportiva	2	64	51	12	15	37	59	113	-54
320	SD Ciudad de Santiago	1	38	50	13	11	14	42	42	0
321	CD Utrera	2	76	50	10	27	39	48	98	-50
322	Burgos CF (1936–1983)	1	38	47	19	9	10	61	31	30
323	CD Boiro	1	38	45	11	12	15	39	45	-6
324	UD Almansa	1	38	43	10	13	15	35	43	-8
325	CD Cieza	2	76	43	14	15	47	63	149	-86
326	Club Siero	1	38	42	10	12	16	42	55	-13
327	Mazarrón CF	1	38	42	11	9	18	37	55	-18
328	CF Llíria	2	76	42	11	18	47	59	161	-102
329	SD Formentera	1	38	41	9	14	15	25	41	-16
330	Antequera CF	1	38	40	10	10	18	43	56	-13
331	CD Burriana	1	38	40	9	13	16	27	48	-21
332	CD Cobeña	1	38	39	10	9	19	50	61	-11
333	CF Pobla de Mafumet	1	38	38	7	17	14	34	47	-13
334	Atlético Mancha Real	1	38	38	10	8	20	44	64	-20
335	CD La Muela	1	38	38	8	14	16	36	56	-20
336	Loja CD	1	38	38	9	11	18	30	54	-24
337	CD Palencia Balompié	1	38	38	10	8	20	26	60	-34
338	CD Laudio	1	38	37	10	7	21	42	66	-24
339	CF Sóller	1	38	37	9	10	19	43	68	-25
340	CF Trival Valderas	1	38	37	8	13	17	42	71	-29
341	CD Puerta Bonita	1	38	36	7	15	16	35	52	-17
342	CD Onda	1	38	36	10	6	22	44	73	-29
343	CD Llosetense	1	38	35	9	8	21	26	54	-28
344	Jerez Industrial CF	1	38	35	10	5	23	33	73	-40
345	SD Negreira	1	38	34	8	10	20	30	54	-24
346	CD Orientación Marítima	1	38	34	8	10	20	42	73	-31
347	CP Villarrobledo	2	54	34	7	13	34	43	89	-46
348	UD Tamaraceite	1	24	33	7	12	5	23	20	3
349	UE Rubí	1	38	33	9	15	14	42	55	-13
350	CF Figueruelas	1	38	33	8	9	21	34	66	-32
351	SD Tarazona	1	26	31	9	4	13	22	33	-11
352	CD Ronda	1	38	31	11	9	18	37	56	-19
353	CD Binissalem	1	40	30	7	9	24	22	61	-39
354	Atzeneta UE	1	26	28	7	7	12	27	29	-2
355	Arenas CD	1	38	28	5	13	20	32	49	-17
356	UDC Txantrea	1	38	28	5	13	20	19	44	-25
357	Torredonjimeno CF	1	38	28	6	10	22	33	62	-29
358	FC Santboià	1	38	28	7	7	24	35	65	-30
359	CD Roldán	1	38	27	9	9	20	30	47	-17
360	UD Oliva	1	38	26	9	8	21	37	59	-22
361	CA Arteixo	1	38	26	5	11	22	32	69	-37
362	Santoña CF	1	38	25	7	11	20	19	49	-30
363	CCD Cerceda	1	38	25	5	10	23	26	62	-36
364	Ribadesella CF	1	38	25	5	10	23	22	69	-47
365	CE Júpiter	1	38	24	7	10	21	32	65	-33
366	UD Los Palacios	1	38	23	4	11	23	21	51	-30
367	Nules CF	1	38	23	7	9	22	32	66	-34
368	DAV Santa Ana	1	38	23	5	8	25	30	79	-49
369	CD Getxo	1	38	22	9	4	25	40	79	-39
370	Utebo FC	1	38	22	6	10	22	18	59	-41
371	CD Sariñena	1	38	22	4	10	24	17	58	-41
372	CE Europa	1	38	21	7	7	24	31	67	-36
373	CD Mosconia	1	38	21	7	7	24	29	68	-39
374	SD Gimnástica Arandina	1	38	20	4	12	22	30	68	-38
375	UD Horadada	1	38	19	6	7	25	28	69	-41
376	CD Villanovense	1	38	19	6	7	25	20	71	-51
377	Gimnástica Medinense	1	38	17	5	9	24	29	79	-50
378	SD Hullera Vasco-Leonesa	1	38	17	4	9	25	24	86	-62
379	Jumilla CF	1	38	16	5	4	29	16	72	-56
380	CD Covadonga	1	26	15	4	3	19	31	57	-26
381	CD Santa Ponsa	1	38	15	2	11	25	24	92	-68
382	Sporting Villanueva Promesas	1	38	14	2	11	25	16	42	-26
383	CD Touring	1	38	14	4	6	28	28	82	-54
384	Daimiel CF	1	38	11	2	7	29	19	118	-99

=== Tercera División ===
==== All-time table (1929–2021) ====
The all-time table is an overall record of all match results, points, and goals of every team that has played in Tercera División (third division until 1977; fourth division until 2021) since its creation in 1929 and until its last season, 2020–21. The division was replaced by Tercera División RFEF and demoted to fifth tier, after the creation of a new third tier named Primera División RFEF.

All-time Tercera División table
Pos	Team	S	GP	Pts	W	D	L	GF	GA
1	CE Constància	59	2057	2920	1015	434	608	3502	2425
2	Real Murcia Imperial	68	2185	2832	972	509	704	3760	2824
3	CP Cacereño	56	1869	2792	1064	360	445	3851	1961
4	Rayo Cantabria	57	1968	2791	983	449	536	3637	2273
5	Caudal Deportivo	53	1868	2768	991	467	410	3232	1750
6	CD Eldense	59	2035	2763	952	503	580	3283	2239
7	CD Don Benito	52	1857	2747	947	409	501	3337	2089
8	Gimnástica Segoviana CF	55	1899	2673	881	431	587	3255	2493
9	CE Europa	57	2073	2659	878	510	685	3235	2697
10	CD Calahorra	50	1787	2530	877	354	556	3192	2259
11	UD Poblense	53	1842	2524	809	449	584	2794	2224
12	CD Basconia	55	1966	2521	807	521	638	2913	2478
13	UP Langreo	46	1606	2501	885	363	358	3068	1589
14	CD Atlético Baleares	53	1742	2470	898	397	447	3235	1922
15	Arenas Club de Getxo	61	2110	2468	812	591	707	2806	2540
16	UP Plasencia	52	1828	2466	855	388	585	3156	2276
17	CD Laredo	48	1732	2452	790	415	527	2517	1985
18	CD Tudelano	55	1918	2401	832	457	629	3000	2561
19	CD Manacor	56	1874	2391	840	373	661	2999	2547
20	Gimnástica de Torrelavega	50	1616	2349	878	311	427	3007	1754
21	Andorra CF	43	1558	2324	810	322	426	2842	1731
22	Deportivo Fabril	50	1745	2308	777	449	519	2780	2037
23	CD Teruel	43	1531	2267	737	357	437	2554	1852
24	UDC Txantrea	50	1839	2247	701	489	649	2654	2473
25	Atlético Monzón	52	1877	2239	721	462	694	2751	2740
26	CP Villarrobledo	39	1482	2196	668	431	383	2249	1497
27	Arosa SC	54	1867	2189	725	458	684	2575	2535
28	UD Barbastro	44	1585	2158	732	343	510	2534	1998
29	SD Tenisca	42	1593	2150	672	391	530	2349	2006
30	CD Guadalajara	51	1785	2147	717	403	665	2609	2588
31	Coria CF	52	1808	2142	712	427	669	2581	2416
32	CD Alfaro	42	1520	2115	686	343	491	2501	1969
33	Peña Sport FC	38	1385	2107	690	362	333	2257	1519
34	CD Mirandés	50	1698	2095	753	371	574	2674	2328
35	Club Haro Deportivo	36	1345	2087	643	305	397	2304	1515
36	Club Siero	51	1832	2071	671	487	674	2437	2460
37	CA Bembibre	43	1602	2070	650	407	545	2244	1893
38	Real Valladolid Promesas	42	1464	2064	766	312	386	2758	1579
39	Real Balompédica Linense	48	1600	2058	721	412	467	2488	1845
40	UD Salamanca B	46	1694	2044	675	443	576	2349	2005
41	Real Ávila CF	45	1522	2036	647	351	524	2435	2098
42	CD Oberena	47	1718	2018	640	407	671	2402	2431
43	UD Las Palmas Atlético	32	1233	1991	657	305	271	2374	1132
44	UE Sant Andreu	44	1537	1987	707	348	482	2540	1961
45	CD Puertollano	40	1400	1978	690	334	376	2466	1534
46	Algeciras CF	43	1434	1957	685	336	413	2478	1764
47	Utebo FC	39	1389	1957	595	321	473	2060	1889
48	Ontinyent CF	42	1532	1952	683	385	464	2219	1634
49	Moralo CP	37	1388	1947	628	330	430	2098	1522
50	UM Escobedo	33	1222	1936	582	328	312	1958	1271
51	CF Reus Deportiu	49	1723	1936	672	387	664	2556	2504
52	SD Ejea	44	1586	1933	641	349	596	2475	2303
53	Terrassa FC	44	1523	1928	695	364	464	2478	1983
54	SCR Peña Deportiva	31	1184	1920	589	296	299	1767	1105
55	CD Cayón	39	1462	1916	591	370	501	1918	1697
56	Alondras CF	44	1591	1912	585	422	584	2063	2082
57	SD Ponferradina	46	1523	1903	767	302	454	2872	1959
58	UD Alzira	43	1514	1894	620	385	509	2113	1946
59	CF Gandía	43	1528	1887	690	374	464	2375	1753
60	CD San Fernando	41	1484	1885	656	361	467	2382	1862
61	SCD Durango	41	1432	1875	580	398	454	1950	1640
62	Novelda CF	44	1548	1871	614	341	593	2101	2181
63	CD Olímpic de Xàtiva	46	1536	1864	656	362	518	2359	1940
64	Girona FC	44	1500	1861	694	342	464	2601	1874
65	Jerez CF	29	1086	1831	601	226	259	1960	1024
66	CD Tenerife B	35	1323	1818	546	351	426	1967	1594
67	Castro FC	39	1476	1809	571	373	532	1857	1768
68	CD Valle de Egüés	35	1311	1803	524	347	440	1927	1679
69	Atlético Sanluqueño CF	38	1415	1802	559	364	492	1845	1743
70	AD Sabiñánigo	43	1590	1787	576	394	620	2243	2389
71	SD Barreda Balompié	47	1652	1782	535	413	704	2029	2522
72	CD Sariñena	35	1323	1780	524	347	452	1730	1609
73	CD Tropezón	26	966	1760	523	257	186	1604	828
74	CF Sporting Mahonés (Note: Includes CD Menorca's participations)	44	1444	1753	608	322	514	2115	1821
75	Real Avilés CF	34	1214	1729	581	309	324	1981	1269
76	CD Binéfar	41	1441	1723	596	300	545	2217	2121
77	CD Toledo	42	1348	1722	624	272	452	2447	1962
78	Racing Club Portuense	41	1435	1715	605	345	485	2001	1723
79	AD Parla	33	1256	1715	513	350	393	1703	1439
80	CD San Fernando	38	1450	1714	497	418	535	1776	1875
81	RSD Alcalá	37	1286	1712	555	308	423	1917	1638
82	CD Getxo	48	1636	1704	609	401	626	2331	2226
83	UB Conquense	41	1385	1695	588	318	479	2001	1855
84	Vélez CF	38	1409	1679	527	330	552	1803	1934
85	Jerez Industrial CF	40	1437	1678	583	355	499	2013	1742
86	SD Gernika Club	35	1308	1675	523	374	411	1581	1330
87	CD Binissalem	37	1296	1674	485	331	480	1729	1820
88	RCD Carabanchel	45	1606	1670	579	388	639	2205	2335
89	SD Amorebieta	36	1320	1668	527	379	414	1793	1546
90	Elche Ilicitano CF	38	1394	1650	514	358	522	1853	1825
91	Zalla UC	31	1178	1640	486	338	354	1403	1235
92	CD Tortosa	44	1564	1636	614	304	646	2449	2451
93	CD Ferriolense	31	1163	1628	470	291	402	1715	1469
94	UCD Burladés	36	1347	1626	472	377	498	1568	1639
95	Real Madrid CF C	28	1076	1609	521	273	282	1850	1156
96	EC Granollers	47	1545	1602	568	317	660	2523	2650
97	Galáctico Pegaso	35	1344	1597	535	345	464	1888	1718
98	CD Turón	47	1638	1596	575	380	683	2063	2459
99	Club Lemos	51	1706	1595	531	419	756	1975	2589
100	Deportivo Aragón	27	976	1575	543	211	222	1831	892
101	CD Acero	47	1548	1575	556	321	671	2114	2441
102	CD Lugo	36	1216	1563	612	277	327	2107	1315
103	CD Bezana	28	1044	1561	430	296	318	1432	1213
104	Júpiter Leonés	43	1499	1561	502	353	644	1969	2284
105	CD Pozoblanco	35	1302	1551	478	349	475	1690	1706
106	CE Alaior	47	1550	1551	492	367	691	1864	2417
107	Club Portugalete	31	1070	1550	469	281	320	1561	1237
108	Rayo Vallecano B	29	1106	1546	446	310	350	1595	1289
109	Martos CD	32	1242	1535	523	259	460	1751	1527
110	CD Lealtad	25	940	1534	464	250	226	1503	946
111	CE Júpiter	47	1532	1530	538	373	621	2332	2512
112	CD Izarra	36	1220	1524	498	278	444	1846	1893
113	CD Manchego	41	1310	1522	597	304	409	2251	1722
114	CE Manresa	40	1425	1520	547	322	556	2192	2169
115	RC Celta de Vigo B	38	1264	1517	542	304	418	1960	1582
116	CD Lagun Onak	34	1274	1511	420	358	496	1362	1504
117	Águilas CF	35	1243	1510	524	295	424	2061	1776
118	CD Díter Zafra	30	1142	1505	482	275	385	1588	1361
119	CD Onda	34	1228	1504	484	316	428	1720	1532
120	Arandina CF	27	1004	1496	443	259	302	1496	1125
121	La Bañeza FC	37	1341	1496	450	337	554	1593	1987
122	Real Unión	40	1354	1491	587	299	468	2101	1762
123	Alicante CF	45	1386	1491	552	314	520	2206	1957
124	AD San Juan	28	1045	1487	423	326	296	1347	1081
125	SD Huesca	30	1084	1481	555	258	271	1967	1161
126	Santoña CF	44	1480	1480	487	345	648	1732	2197
127	CCD Cerceda	23	872	1476	420	234	218	1297	856
128	CD Santurtzi	35	1256	1474	433	406	417	1449	1429
129	Marino de Luanco	29	1046	1473	469	272	305	1581	1207
130	Valencia CF Mestalla	28	1028	1469	556	239	233	1866	917
131	SD Noja	22	838	1463	447	219	172	1446	689
132	CD San Martín	39	1372	1455	495	331	546	1835	1993
133	CD Alcoyano	31	1070	1445	516	258	296	1708	1133
134	CDC Moscardó	34	1268	1442	505	342	421	1730	1473
135	CD Coria	28	1048	1442	417	228	403	1460	1503
136	Málaga CF	39	1326	1434	562	313	451	2126	1666
137	SD Almazán	34	1281	1428	417	337	527	1523	1863
138	Atlético Astorga FC	29	1088	1427	455	268	365	1553	1334
139	Tolosa CF	45	1502	1425	460	404	638	1788	2202
140	RCD Mallorca B	23	857	1418	493	197	167	1780	792
141	Gran Peña FC	39	1392	1414	491	374	527	1881	1953
142	Betis Deportivo Balompié	28	1023	1412	504	241	278	1711	1070
143	UD Fraga	28	1025	1411	467	207	351	1689	1346
144	Real Aranjuez CF	37	1296	1411	484	311	501	1920	1937
145	SD Beasain	29	1020	1399	409	294	317	1458	1321
146	CF Balaguer	31	1164	1398	443	293	428	1633	1588
147	CF Badalona (1903–2002)	38	1222	1393	536	283	403	2102	1825
148	CD Cieza	30	1133	1390	443	264	426	1541	1487
149	CD Aurrerá de Ondarroa	32	1192	1386	425	362	405	1396	1394
150	UD Gijón Industrial	34	1270	1381	390	354	526	1441	1775
151	CE Mataró	33	1176	1377	474	265	437	1956	1846
152	CF Gavà	33	1228	1370	444	266	518	1788	2046
153	CF Rayo Majadahonda	25	972	1368	419	236	317	1393	1158
154	UD Lanzarote	27	1013	1368	423	259	331	1405	1235
155	UD Ibarra	31	1170	1363	404	289	477	1473	1601
156	Puerto Real CF	35	1261	1360	433	311	517	1573	1773
157	Cultural y Deportiva Leonesa	28	926	1351	562	177	187	2028	942
158	CD Tuilla	24	888	1350	380	237	271	1294	1097
159	CD Badajoz (1940–2012)	32	1032	1349	537	195	300	2106	1233
160	CF Gimnástico Alcázar	28	1064	1347	411	275	378	1335	1256
161	Cartagena FC	31	1034	1345	518	218	298	1979	1229
162	Ayamonte CF	36	1285	1344	432	314	539	1527	1774
163	Club Atlético Malagueño	19	715	1340	388	176	151	1337	656
164	CD Mensajero	25	944	1337	433	233	278	1436	1010
165	AEC Manlleu	28	1048	1334	414	263	371	1598	1507
166	Atlètic Ciutadella CF	40	1292	1327	449	287	556	1754	2060
167	UD Telde	27	1030	1321	408	288	334	1469	1229
168	CD Arnedo	30	1103	1321	411	267	425	1479	1488
169	Orihuela Deportiva CF	38	1258	1316	530	258	470	2021	1836
170	Zamora CF	24	906	1315	468	207	231	1442	867
171	Atlético Albacete	23	850	1315	360	235	255	1240	889
172	Ribamontán al Mar CF	29	1085	1313	376	267	442	1264	1419
173	CD Laguna de Tenerife	29	1119	1310	410	294	415	1457	1436
174	CD Burriana	29	1036	1309	447	257	332	1473	1213
175	CA River Ebro	29	1073	1308	370	269	434	1410	1574
176	Real Sociedad B	27	960	1300	477	214	269	1833	1124
177	UD Socuéllamos	28	1012	1298	389	242	381	1298	1336
178	AD Universidad de Oviedo	23	874	1294	375	216	283	1285	1048
179	CF Valdepeñas	31	1170	1293	452	287	431	1485	1420
180	CP Mérida	37	1171	1292	518	256	397	1944	1690
181	Antequera CF	26	981	1292	363	242	376	1282	1238
182	UD Almansa	22	815	1280	349	233	233	1112	868
183	CD Móstoles	23	888	1278	405	232	251	1341	937
184	SD Eibar	28	972	1277	538	201	233	1903	992
185	FC Barcelona C	25	952	1275	429	240	283	1737	1213
186	CA Pinto	25	946	1271	349	254	343	1156	1163
187	UD Maracena	26	985	1267	365	257	363	1274	1232
188	Mérida AD (Note: Includes Mérida UD's participations)	18	686	1265	387	173	126	1224	523
189	Caravaca CF	24	907	1265	398	220	289	1383	1062
190	CD Lalín	24	912	1261	385	254	273	1157	944
191	Cádiz CF B	26	1011	1261	382	277	352	1330	1177
192	CD Iruña	28	1002	1259	382	237	383	1462	1500
193	Loja CD	24	907	1255	350	232	325	1170	1162
194	CD Ourense	24	820	1254	498	174	148	1655	673
195	Sevilla Atlético	27	924	1252	509	207	208	1862	940
196	FC Vilafranca	30	1125	1251	401	253	471	1549	1765
197	UD Mutilvera	18	673	1244	365	149	159	1121	622
198	CF Platges de Calvià	25	931	1241	356	229	346	1185	1231
199	Real Avilés CF (1903–1983)	35	993	1234	528	178	287	1943	1133
200	CD Numancia	33	1082	1226	510	206	366	2025	1544
201	FC Santboià	28	1054	1219	376	247	431	1442	1552
202	CF Sóller	32	1167	1216	383	279	505	1576	1881
203	CD Logroñés	29	881	1214	495	173	213	1811	987
204	Viveiro CF	29	1060	1214	380	312	368	1339	1364
205	UD Villa de Santa Brígida	21	788	1213	330	223	235	1095	899
206	Real Jaén CF	28	919	1210	485	155	279	1596	1025
207	CD Mosconia	28	1044	1202	350	282	412	1255	1410
208	UD San Pedro	27	1050	1194	385	251	414	1353	1389
209	CD Guarnizo	31	1122	1185	334	294	494	1335	1697
210	Náxara CD	17	609	1183	352	127	130	1224	625
211	CD Anguiano	17	609	1183	355	118	136	1275	683
212	SD Hullera Vasco-Leonesa	32	1132	1183	401	249	482	1516	1783
213	Racing de Ferrol	27	807	1175	452	180	175	1603	738
214	CD Béjar Industrial	33	1152	1171	426	229	497	1711	1864
215	CD Elgoibar	28	982	1167	369	257	356	1299	1255
216	CD Quintanar del Rey	21	776	1166	312	230	234	984	876
217	SD Compostela	22	785	1158	427	175	183	1407	746
218	CD Azuqueca	26	970	1155	342	256	372	1304	1346
219	CF Igualada	35	1255	1147	412	283	560	1765	2166
220	CD Numancia B	20	742	1146	322	180	240	1069	863
221	CDA Navalcarnero	23	874	1143	327	230	317	1117	1171
222	UC La Estrella	29	1106	1139	337	282	487	1254	1602
223	Albacete Balompié	30	884	1135	501	133	250	1786	1033
224	UE Olot	28	1050	1128	421	225	404	1666	1571
225	CD Naval	35	1272	1128	375	303	594	1450	1959
226	Real Titánico	26	958	1118	352	245	361	1191	1247
227	Jumilla CF	24	907	1116	333	234	340	1188	1200
228	CF Extremadura	26	922	1111	455	201	266	1705	1009
229	Bergantiños FC	23	849	1110	327	238	284	1013	897
230	Juventud Torremolinos CF	29	1078	1107	359	251	468	1342	1626
231	Pontevedra CF	29	832	1105	431	159	242	1566	1077
232	Catarroja CF	28	968	1105	375	211	382	1375	1454
233	SP Villafranca	25	954	1104	335	225	394	1230	1332
234	Betanzos CF	27	980	1101	320	254	406	1212	1418
235	CD Ronda	29	1024	1100	381	209	434	1469	1610
236	CD Praviano	29	1018	1100	339	272	407	1223	1410
237	Hellín Deportivo	20	758	1097	299	227	232	975	803
238	Rápido de Bouzas	23	825	1096	298	225	302	1025	1047
239	CE Santanyí	24	895	1096	312	221	362	1180	1306
240	CA Cirbonero	22	809	1095	308	220	281	1164	1093
241	CE L'Hospitalet	22	767	1094	379	180	208	1396	952
242	Talavera CF	25	916	1092	422	219	275	1378	1064
243	SD Erandio Club	39	1152	1090	416	249	487	1687	1812
244	DAV Santa Ana	23	876	1088	311	215	350	1152	1214
245	Palamós CF	20	762	1084	302	201	259	1052	950
246	CF Platges de Calvià B	23	878	1083	328	245	305	1234	1067
247	Tomelloso CF	18	682	1082	315	194	173	995	617
248	AD Mar Menor-San Javier	17	648	1074	338	165	145	1164	661
249	Xerez CD	26	859	1073	416	189	254	1457	1001
250	CD Mairena	22	853	1071	324	253	276	1046	939
251	SD Sueca	31	1034	1069	391	224	419	1407	1550
252	Gimnàstic de Tarragona	25	858	1064	442	180	236	1542	996
253	Villalonga FC	23	872	1064	304	249	319	1088	1091
254	Sestao SC	32	894	1063	443	177	274	1678	1182
255	Orihuela CF	14	541	1060	311	127	103	938	435
256	Ribadesella CF	22	836	1060	301	237	298	1041	1058
257	CF Vimenor	25	932	1057	294	258	380	1071	1300
258	Real Oviedo B (1929–2003)	26	884	1046	381	217	286	1436	1120
259	CD Llanes	20	736	1046	280	206	250	995	936
260	Candás CF	26	932	1039	327	255	350	1105	1195
261	CF Villanovense	14	525	1038	310	108	107	971	452
262	UD Los Barrios	21	790	1035	274	213	303	920	1006
263	CD Roquetas	20	780	1034	313	202	265	1145	977
264	Úbeda CF	26	1004	1033	341	231	432	1264	1428
265	SD Zamudio	20	760	1030	278	207	275	918	915
266	UE Sants	31	981	1029	389	203	389	1616	1592
267	Crevillente Deportivo	23	874	1021	284	263	327	936	1075
268	Villanueva CF	21	793	1018	274	196	323	1032	1132
269	Club Olímpico de Totana	27	1001	1012	305	251	445	1235	1660
270	Las Rozas CF	19	738	1011	290	203	245	959	863
271	Atlético Levante UD	21	758	1009	311	184	263	1072	969
272	Pinatar CF	22	825	1009	294	218	313	1091	1122
273	Deportivo Alavés B	20	760	1006	283	217	260	1001	852
274	CD Alhaurino	23	854	1006	299	198	357	1152	1260
275	UD Los Palacios	19	735	1005	278	231	226	939	805
276	Velarde CF	20	762	1005	279	200	283	954	982
277	CD Marino	20	758	1004	306	201	251	1049	929
278	UA Horta	29	1053	1002	332	228	493	1374	1871
279	SD Tarazona	21	790	998	313	182	295	1133	1070
280	CD Badajoz B	20	762	997	325	188	249	1081	852
281	SD Atlético Albericia	24	892	996	263	236	393	992	1325
282	Atlético Saguntino	26	900	993	318	228	354	1124	1308
283	CD Banyoles	25	935	990	319	228	388	1272	1433
284	CD Castellón	19	658	989	346	166	146	1193	636
285	CD Alcalá	20	743	988	294	198	251	939	871
286	Granada Atlético CF	18	700	987	305	194	201	918	662
287	Burjassot CF	20	734	987	268	208	258	919	945
288	FC Jove Español San Vicente (Note: Includes CD Español de San Vicente's participations)	23	866	984	282	218	366	995	1141
289	CD Azkoyen	24	824	983	314	182	328	1198	1285
290	CF Palencia	18	688	976	331	168	189	1113	746
291	Gimnástica Medinense	26	954	974	335	210	409	1156	1455
292	Alcañiz CF	25	910	973	300	218	392	1185	1436
293	Atlético Madrid C	19	740	972	260	192	288	1000	1032
294	UD Realejos	22	845	964	309	189	347	1114	1237
295	UD Horadada	22	831	963	304	206	321	1115	1137
296	UD Las Zocas	19	733	963	260	183	290	891	995
297	UD Orotava	21	806	957	338	185	283	1207	1028
298	Racing Club Villalbés	19	697	957	263	203	231	837	800
299	UD Montijo	25	930	955	310	218	402	1120	1383
300	SD Balmaseda FC	24	842	954	297	215	330	1030	1162
301	FC Martinenc	32	990	952	362	215	413	1609	1745
302	CD Torrijos	23	828	952	257	242	329	898	1126
303	Barakaldo CF	23	672	948	388	150	134	1218	618
304	Sporting de Gijón B	16	608	948	320	159	129	1073	540
305	AD Ceuta FC	23	781	946	294	201	286	1066	1060
306	CD Santa Amalia	22	840	946	255	201	384	934	1299
307	CD Huarte	20	735	940	240	220	275	903	964
308	SD Ibiza	25	824	939	378	183	263	1167	881
309	SD Oyonesa	17	609	938	266	140	203	902	739
310	CD San Roque de Lepe	19	704	936	289	165	250	919	854
311	Real Madrid Castilla	22	710	935	396	143	171	1529	773
312	UE Alcúdia	19	707	934	257	189	261	853	917
313	Manzanares CF	23	846	932	284	214	348	1069	1225
314	SD Textil Escudo	22	812	928	263	170	379	931	1172
315	Condal CF	19	702	927	243	198	261	837	912
316	CD As Pontes	21	757	924	277	209	271	987	981
317	UC Ceares	21	768	924	242	208	318	866	1112
318	AD Colmenar Viejo	20	778	922	272	186	320	1078	1197
319	UD San Sebastián de los Reyes	16	622	913	273	173	176	865	622
320	Motril CF	16	614	913	272	163	179	877	644
321	CD Puerta Bonita	20	780	913	235	240	305	938	1070
322	CD Ebro	19	730	912	257	189	284	920	989
323	Racing Lermeño CF	22	842	909	283	219	340	1030	1168
324	CD Agoncillo	20	739	905	243	176	320	943	1142
325	AD Siete Villas	18	662	900	240	180	242	869	891
326	CD Laudio	22	760	895	274	195	291	983	983
327	CD Beti Onak	21	779	895	253	207	319	935	1128
328	Atlético Mancha Real	16	599	894	242	168	189	723	594
329	SD Órdenes	23	826	892	260	228	338	928	1159
330	Club Recreativo Granada	29	946	883	324	187	435	1320	1570
331	Águilas FC	17	609	879	245	144	220	829	786
332	Chiclana CF	23	859	877	260	230	369	1003	1281
333	SD Compostela B	18	686	876	269	192	225	899	812
334	Córdoba CF B	17	634	875	233	176	225	856	791
335	Villarreal CF	23	838	872	336	200	302	1140	1022
336	CD Comarca de Níjar	16	620	868	242	142	236	774	805
337	Yeclano CF	18	672	865	311	165	196	1137	843
338	Coruxo FC	23	808	862	269	200	339	975	1236
339	CE Felanitx	23	861	861	260	201	400	975	1347
340	CD Baza	19	732	858	284	156	292	934	968
341	CD Leganés B	16	598	856	249	146	203	874	758
342	CD Paracuellos Antamira	15	564	854	229	167	168	761	616
343	CD Touring	25	866	852	296	206	364	1197	1349
344	UD Gáldar	16	615	851	252	161	202	836	723
345	Lucena CF	18	700	850	238	208	254	814	883
346	Pego CF	20	744	849	233	217	294	816	987
347	CD Rota	24	881	846	269	224	388	953	1275
348	SD Navarro CF	20	740	845	221	201	318	829	1024
349	Deportivo Alavés	22	670	844	352	140	178	1279	770
350	CD Covadonga	16	598	837	234	135	229	879	823
351	UD Salamanca	19	572	833	368	97	107	1408	528
352	CF Illueca	18	668	831	236	164	268	853	928
353	Navia CF	18	684	828	235	194	255	857	894
354	Club Hispano de Castrillón	21	782	827	269	200	313	974	1090
355	UD Casetas	14	536	826	249	121	166	871	629
356	CD Varea	11	396	822	256	54	86	953	396
357	AD Torrejón CF	21	794	822	254	204	336	934	1122
358	Atlético Onubense	19	695	821	238	173	284	882	951
359	UD Carcaixent	26	860	821	307	191	362	1165	1357
360	CD Corralejo (1975–2004)	14	538	819	271	127	140	858	488
361	CF Vilanova	19	698	819	249	181	268	1050	1075
362	CD Dénia	18	692	816	243	199	250	824	834
363	Arenas SD	27	756	815	344	127	285	1447	1267
364	Recreativo de Huelva	23	654	814	342	130	182	1394	846
365	CD Aoiz	17	650	814	209	187	254	715	824
366	SD Unión Club	23	838	812	281	207	350	968	1187
367	Santutxu FC	21	776	812	227	230	319	772	1020
368	Ourense CF	14	519	810	230	134	155	799	618
369	Deportivo Rayo Cantabria	14	530	808	227	127	176	818	661
370	Arenas CD	16	624	805	223	164	237	743	787
371	Club Lleida Esportiu	22	714	802	326	150	238	1209	952
372	Villarreal CF C	14	524	800	220	140	164	815	644
373	CF Santomera	21	787	792	243	198	346	880	1191
374	AD Las Palas	15	565	791	228	135	202	824	713
375	UE Castelldefels	17	625	791	209	164	252	730	821
376	UE Vilajuïga	20	712	786	316	147	249	1287	1092
377	CD Benavente	21	802	783	239	189	374	950	1387
378	CD Barco	18	669	776	246	190	233	826	791
379	SD Portmany	21	777	776	271	191	315	1037	1127
380	Levante UD	21	584	774	326	122	136	1206	601
381	CE Campos	16	608	774	207	165	236	767	835
382	Getafe CF B	13	506	768	217	130	159	699	550
383	Yeclano Deportivo	11	410	767	228	83	99	786	426
384	La Roda CF	14	508	763	205	148	155	681	574
385	CD Hernani	19	706	763	244	194	268	844	965
386	CA Marbella	18	641	759	303	153	185	963	654
387	AE Prat	14	534	757	212	152	170	717	624
388	Sestao River Club	11	396	755	218	101	77	627	286
389	Astur CF	17	646	755	204	166	276	761	942
390	CF Fuenlabrada	14	536	754	260	123	153	826	550
391	CD Llosetense	16	593	751	219	147	227	813	889
392	CD Mármol Macael	17	660	750	250	169	241	848	803
393	SD Deusto	22	730	749	243	196	291	909	1103
394	Sevilla FC C	14	522	748	197	157	168	655	592
395	CD Miajadas	19	704	747	221	148	335	760	1164
396	Porriño Industrial FC	20	710	746	227	173	310	970	1181
397	La Palma CF	21	744	746	237	172	335	913	1171
398	CD Utrera	15	569	745	238	141	190	805	629
399	Montilla CF	17	662	740	218	194	250	721	776
400	UDA Gramenet	20	744	740	266	183	295	1133	1191
401	Atlético Tordesillas	16	588	740	199	143	246	691	844
402	CD Becerril	17	630	740	198	146	286	711	929
403	CP Granada 74	12	470	738	205	123	142	683	537
404	CD Torrevieja	14	552	736	191	163	198	654	643
405	Pumarín CF	18	684	735	219	188	277	747	931
406	CD Berceo	21	765	735	213	188	364	840	1246
407	Mar Menor FC	11	384	733	218	79	87	660	349
408	CD Arenteiro	19	677	729	250	180	247	791	822
409	CD Ciempozuelos	16	614	728	229	162	223	843	825
410	UD Somozas	16	585	728	196	160	229	731	789
411	SD Logroñés	8	294	725	232	29	33	764	203
412	RCD Espanyol B	12	456	723	234	117	105	784	470
413	Lorca Atlético CF (Note: Includes Sangonera Atlético CF's participations)	11	421	723	201	120	100	659	416
414	CF Pozuelo de Alarcón	15	558	723	195	149	214	660	752
415	UE Vic	25	870	720	251	185	434	1218	1656
416	SD Negreira	15	566	717	188	153	225	634	702
417	CF Pobla de Mafumet	13	477	715	194	133	150	624	511
418	Villajoyosa CF	17	612	714	240	158	214	882	821
419	Vinaròs CF	19	714	714	247	183	284	818	931
420	CD Azuaga	19	702	713	220	159	323	829	1153
421	UD Almería B	12	441	704	198	110	133	686	495
422	SD Lemona	14	532	704	225	146	161	752	601
423	Benidorm CF	14	524	703	231	155	138	760	534
424	Mondragón CF	21	706	701	257	176	273	1077	1031
425	CD Laguna	16	612	698	213	163	236	763	830
426	CD Caspe	23	798	694	250	167	381	966	1366
427	CD Iliturgi (1941–1970)	23	690	690	292	106	292	1272	1272
428	CD San Isidro	12	462	689	189	122	151	622	539
429	Pinoso CF	14	522	688	206	168	148	618	485
430	CD Cortes	14	513	686	177	155	181	572	656
431	Dos Hermanas CF	15	587	683	195	168	224	744	811
432	CD El Palo	13	481	680	195	118	168	704	646
433	Atlético Granadilla	11	425	676	191	103	131	580	502
434	CD Illescas	14	512	673	179	141	192	625	660
435	CD Marchamalo	14	518	671	183	122	213	635	726
436	CD Pontejos	17	650	668	202	160	288	741	963
437	UD Arenal	19	726	668	189	184	353	759	1166
438	AD Cerro de Reyes	9	344	667	196	79	69	650	318
439	Deportiva Piloñesa	18	684	666	215	175	294	794	984
440	UD Cornellà	12	456	665	182	119	155	584	562
441	CF Sant Rafel	14	511	664	170	162	179	621	607
442	CD Antequerano	22	710	662	263	139	308	1032	1106
443	CD Cardassar	18	650	662	193	174	283	754	1020
444	CD Maspalomas	14	534	661	223	118	193	833	684
445	CD Corellano	18	665	661	221	151	293	854	1029
446	UD Vall de Uxó	16	604	659	209	165	230	715	791
447	Daimiel CF	18	684	659	213	179	292	771	947
448	UE Vilassar de Mar	15	549	657	170	147	232	678	839
449	Olivenza CP (Note: Includes CF Olivenza's participations)	19	716	653	173	172	371	697	1292
450	UD Vecindario	14	534	652	211	152	171	669	586
451	CA Artajonés	16	610	652	197	160	253	749	860
452	CD Murchante	15	547	651	166	153	228	569	749
453	Bermeo FT	16	584	647	179	170	235	665	780
454	Arroyo CP	13	472	645	179	108	185	627	657
455	CF La Nucía	10	392	644	175	119	98	529	351
456	Céltiga FC	16	606	643	197	147	262	652	817
457	CD Grabasa Burguillos	12	456	642	194	114	148	640	556
458	CF La Solana	17	626	642	182	158	286	646	872
459	FC Barcelona B	14	490	639	252	110	128	941	588
460	CD Anaitasuna	21	740	639	218	176	346	882	1169
461	Getafe Deportivo	18	610	638	247	144	219	903	871
462	Arcos CF	14	523	638	170	136	217	610	734
463	SD Gimnástica Arandina	20	676	638	251	136	289	973	1155
464	SD Reocín	15	574	635	185	132	257	653	774
465	Muleño CF	18	658	634	175	159	324	673	1070
466	CE Premià	13	496	632	182	124	190	700	670
467	CF Vilafranca	10	382	631	177	100	105	602	419
468	Norma San Leonardo CF	11	418	631	173	112	133	563	476
469	CD La Almunia	16	612	629	182	132	298	757	1073
470	CD Huétor Tájar	12	443	627	169	120	154	615	593
471	CD Palencia Cristo Atlético	13	474	627	175	102	197	595	633
472	CF Calella	17	650	627	246	135	269	875	983
473	CD Victoria	14	539	627	164	138	237	589	789
474	SD Indautxu	18	544	626	225	126	193	951	867
475	CD Estepona	16	596	626	247	132	217	784	780
476	UD Collerense	15	549	626	168	122	259	674	905
477	Atarfe Industrial CF	15	580	625	193	136	251	778	908
478	Estrella CF	13	496	621	187	128	181	585	606
479	CD Leganés	19	642	621	227	167	248	957	1026
480	Marbella FC	9	350	615	178	81	91	584	353
481	Luarca CF	19	644	615	202	159	283	756	970
482	Ferrol Atlético	23	646	614	254	110	282	1053	1090
483	CD Coslada	13	510	614	170	126	214	622	746
484	CA Pulpileño	12	426	612	167	111	148	580	520
485	Castillo CF	9	349	610	168	106	75	502	317
486	CD Valdelacalzada	15	570	610	161	135	274	584	905
487	SD Eibar B	12	456	608	156	140	160	509	489
488	CF Trival Valderas	11	400	607	162	121	117	542	433
489	UE Tàrrega (Note: Includes CF Tárrega's participations)	14	516	607	175	122	219	725	861
490	Paterna CF	17	628	607	168	177	283	621	944
491	CD Beniel	18	671	605	181	160	330	689	1076
492	CD Choco	14	471	600	183	109	179	687	670
493	Polideportivo Ejido	9	356	595	205	85	66	647	308
494	CD Madridejos	14	516	593	166	143	207	555	663
495	UD Xove Lago	12	458	591	164	137	157	522	518
496	SD Formentera	9	321	589	173	77	71	508	279
497	UE Rubí	13	496	589	168	129	199	634	693
498	CD Orientación Marítima	11	425	588	159	111	155	553	558
499	Sodupe UC	15	552	585	157	167	228	596	769
500	CE Ferreries	16	610	584	187	170	253	649	805
501	CD Puerto Cruz	14	540	582	214	123	203	780	766
502	CD Bala Azul	14	530	582	152	126	252	679	926
503	UD Logroñés	11	407	580	168	108	131	591	495
504	Melilla CF	16	530	579	239	101	190	810	643
505	Amurrio Club	12	456	579	161	134	161	540	540
506	CF Venta de Baños	17	644	576	189	160	295	666	1001
507	UD Mahón	20	507	575	246	83	178	941	742
508	CF Lloret	14	536	574	222	130	184	793	746
509	CD Castuera	17	648	573	166	156	326	698	1106
510	CD Aluvión	12	456	572	153	113	190	550	670
511	CF Extremadura B	10	382	571	159	94	129	587	475
512	Torredonjimeno CF	9	352	570	161	87	104	519	421
513	CA Osasuna B	10	380	569	192	87	101	649	375
514	AP Almansa	18	622	569	218	133	271	901	1115
515	CD San Marcial	14	521	569	152	113	256	593	881
516	Atlético Madrid B	12	452	568	214	100	138	699	476
517	Burgos CF (1936–1983)	16	450	563	245	74	131	1068	614
518	Elche CF	19	446	563	248	67	131	1101	711
519	CA Monzalbarba	14	534	563	165	141	228	661	819
520	CE Mercadal	12	430	562	154	102	174	544	600
521	Villarrubia CF	9	342	558	155	93	94	477	369
522	UD Oliva	16	568	557	196	128	244	712	825
523	UD Rayo Ibense	17	578	555	192	123	263	766	993
524	CD Boiro	13	494	553	166	141	187	570	662
525	CD Torre Pacheco	14	530	552	202	135	193	713	726
526	CD Pamplona	12	433	552	143	123	167	527	558
527	UD Güímar	14	534	550	204	135	195	673	687
528	UD Melilla	13	492	548	214	120	158	621	522
529	SD San Pedro	12	456	545	137	134	185	481	551
530	Almagro CF	13	474	544	156	114	204	552	658
531	CP Calasancio	15	551	544	140	124	287	492	928
532	CD Logroñés B	15	498	542	189	112	197	746	800
533	CA Vianés	13	476	542	147	101	228	574	813
534	AD Alcorcón	15	576	541	179	161	236	716	851
535	Sporting Villanueva Promesas	8	306	539	155	74	77	471	299
536	CF Figueruelas	10	386	537	149	103	134	496	485
537	CD Comillas	12	456	536	159	137	160	559	586
538	CD Ourense B	16	552	534	183	126	243	694	826
539	SD Lenense	17	608	534	170	151	287	653	971
540	FC Jumilla	10	368	533	153	76	139	547	514
541	Pasaia KE	14	510	533	146	147	217	461	669
542	CD Cuarte	11	402	532	143	103	156	514	572
543	UE Rapitenca	13	472	530	173	103	196	722	784
544	Atlético Cataluña CF	14	510	529	211	107	192	888	812
545	CD Linares	7	278	528	159	72	47	470	208
546	CD Pradejón	15	540	526	135	121	284	598	1030
547	Atlético Calatayud CF	11	422	524	141	101	180	488	562
548	AD Unión Adarve	9	328	522	145	87	96	422	342
549	CD Minera	12	416	521	146	106	164	559	630
550	Conil CF	12	455	521	131	140	184	492	661
551	Gondomar CF	14	534	521	160	135	239	603	797
552	Valencia CF C	10	386	520	137	124	125	437	424
553	CA Zamora	18	502	518	222	74	206	1006	907
554	CD Revilla	13	484	517	130	127	227	487	748
555	SD Borja	9	324	516	137	105	82	414	295
556	CF Badalona	8	306	514	144	82	80	465	368
557	AD Almudévar	11	406	514	140	111	155	540	521
558	CD Villanovense	15	518	513	196	124	198	665	665
559	Mazarrón CF	9	346	512	148	71	127	530	477
560	UD Ibiza-Eivissa	9	344	511	143	82	119	513	434
561	CD Castellón B	12	472	510	142	129	201	547	661
562	Portonovo SD	13	492	510	142	142	208	492	646
563	CDJ Tamarite	14	523	510	150	108	265	581	873
564	CD Utiel	12	460	508	141	119	200	518	661
565	CD Blanes	13	498	506	166	133	199	633	731
566	CF Peralada	10	361	505	137	94	130	480	463
567	CD Galdakao	16	524	505	201	105	218	685	716
568	Real Oviedo Vetusta	8	304	504	144	72	88	510	335
569	Vilobí CF	11	420	503	162	101	157	640	610
570	CD Murense	15	548	503	188	125	235	758	939
571	Extremadura UD B	11	398	500	136	92	170	522	565
572	CD Lourdes	12	441	500	130	110	201	535	706
573	Extremadura UD	6	230	497	149	50	31	497	148
574	CD La Virgen del Camino	10	361	496	138	82	141	478	516
575	AD Torpedo 66	11	416	496	128	112	176	416	524
576	CA Osasuna	12	348	491	210	71	67	759	384
577	UD Santa Marta	13	479	490	124	118	237	448	704
578	Internacional de Madrid	8	308	488	133	89	86	397	320
579	CD Ribaforada	11	422	488	165	111	146	556	553
580	CE Andratx	15	519	485	152	104	263	602	953
581	CD Villena	14	528	484	170	139	219	587	723
582	CD San Andrés (Tenerife)	13	502	483	188	107	207	660	722
583	CD Benicarló (1921–2012)	15	564	483	179	125	260	669	907
584	CD Cala Millor	12	456	482	178	127	151	590	586
585	SD Ponferradina B	14	538	482	142	129	267	578	837
586	CD Ardoi	11	397	480	127	99	171	472	548
587	Alhaurín de la Torre CF	12	441	480	127	99	215	526	749
588	Linares Deportivo	6	227	479	146	41	40	418	178
589	Club Langreano	18	466	478	199	80	187	869	894
590	CD Íscar	11	418	478	130	101	187	482	639
591	CD Aurrerá de Vitoria	12	456	477	141	121	194	473	574
592	CD Huracán Z	8	306	473	129	86	91	410	336
593	Écija Balompié	10	385	471	162	84	139	512	423
594	Atlético Valdemoro	13	502	470	152	125	225	614	792
595	CD Mungia	13	494	469	163	143	188	556	596
596	CA Pueblonuevo	12	460	469	121	128	211	523	762
597	RCD Mallorca	12	337	468	206	56	75	749	350
598	CP Almería	10	363	468	176	87	100	560	368
599	UD Alaró	16	556	468	162	116	278	741	1059
600	CD Villanueva	8	291	467	135	88	68	426	287
601	CD Vera (Tenerife)	10	364	465	124	93	147	515	589
602	UD Logroñés Promesas	7	244	461	140	41	63	472	245
603	Lorca CF	7	262	460	152	58	52	525	236
604	Selaya FC	13	472	460	124	132	216	455	730
605	Athletic Bilbao B	10	364	459	187	85	92	680	374
606	CF Jacetano	14	512	459	138	105	269	588	960
607	CD Cuenca	9	342	458	122	92	128	414	410
608	CD Cantolagua	11	406	458	148	108	150	553	563
609	FC Cartagena-La Unión	7	266	457	129	70	67	428	289
610	Tomelloso CF (1927–1972)	15	442	457	187	83	172	727	732
611	Santa Pola CF	9	350	457	119	100	131	366	418
612	Bollullos CF	13	466	457	142	128	196	531	708
613	Villaverde San Andrés	12	448	456	129	125	194	467	637
614	CD Tauste	15	516	455	152	119	245	668	857
615	CD Margaritense	12	458	454	157	102	199	535	652
616	Torrent CF (1957–1993)	12	446	453	172	109	165	535	537
617	Iliturgi CF	13	496	453	163	130	203	554	628
618	UD Carolinense	11	420	452	144	94	182	501	562
619	CD Estradense	11	397	452	132	112	153	418	483
620	CD Utrera (1946–1969)	18	526	452	178	96	252	831	1097
621	Linares CF	11	390	451	171	109	110	544	383
622	CD Masnou	14	532	449	134	120	278	599	938
623	AD Alcorcón B	9	324	448	118	94	112	418	382
624	Torrevieja CF	10	380	446	169	108	103	563	402
625	CD Calatayud (1946–1965)	15	444	445	191	63	190	779	852
626	CD River Ega	11	406	444	118	90	198	472	640
627	CD Idoya	11	420	444	115	99	206	474	692
628	CF Palafrugell	12	428	443	135	100	193	536	690
629	CD Fuengirola	12	406	442	174	94	138	601	538
630	Santiago de Aller CF	14	476	441	163	105	208	608	722
631	Calasparra FC	10	380	441	115	96	169	455	596
632	UE Figueres	9	325	440	116	92	117	395	397
633	CD La Granja	11	405	438	113	99	193	420	584
634	CD Barquereño	14	514	438	145	108	261	510	873
635	Narón BP	9	338	437	120	77	141	452	497
636	CA Antoniano	10	362	437	109	110	143	439	513
637	UD Amistad	12	350	436	190	56	104	783	501
638	Estudiantes de Murcia CF	10	368	436	117	85	166	448	577
639	CD Vitoria	12	398	434	135	89	174	548	645
640	CA Deva	10	378	434	110	104	164	403	525
641	Burgos CF	5	188	433	131	40	17	369	101
642	Mutriku FT	14	500	433	166	101	233	613	771
643	CD Abarán (1969–1999)	11	409	432	138	112	159	510	569
644	Bergara KE	13	458	432	152	109	197	571	680
645	CD Gerena	8	295	431	119	74	102	427	353
646	Universidad del País Vasco-Vasconia	10	380	429	110	99	171	370	518
647	Yagüe CF	14	509	429	116	99	294	566	1071
648	Club Juventud Cambados	11	420	427	152	109	159	530	570
649	UD Puzol	11	432	427	116	113	203	475	668
650	UD Fuente de Cantos	13	480	425	125	110	245	515	895
651	Verín CF	10	378	420	112	88	178	370	529
652	CD Cudillero	9	342	417	108	101	133	402	452
653	Huércal-Overa CF	9	314	416	115	71	128	397	422
654	CD Manchego Ciudad Real	9	320	416	111	83	126	352	381
655	Deportivo Pacense	8	306	415	117	64	125	440	448
656	SD Colloto	11	418	414	105	99	214	434	690
657	CD Zuera	9	346	412	109	85	152	444	520
658	Ribarroja CF	10	376	411	108	114	154	358	474
659	Imperio de Mérida CP	9	340	410	113	73	154	428	534
660	Real Artesano FC	13	500	410	145	118	237	539	786
661	CMD San Juan	9	352	409	124	100	128	401	409
662	FC Ascó	8	306	408	106	90	110	348	401
663	SD Atlético Camocha	13	446	408	148	112	186	624	685
664	Club Europa de Nava	12	456	408	138	122	196	528	687
665	CD Juvenil	13	382	407	175	57	150	745	658
666	Alcobendas CF	12	460	406	135	119	206	529	701
667	CF Amposta	11	372	405	143	72	157	642	669
668	Atlético de Lugones SD	11	418	405	116	115	187	444	614
669	UD Icodense	12	464	404	146	97	221	528	771
670	Club Imperio de Ceuta SD	17	548	403	139	125	284	629	1011
671	Mora CF	10	380	400	113	72	195	399	540
672	Mequinenza CD	15	472	399	170	63	239	829	1045
673	CD Cabecense	9	342	398	97	107	138	381	478
674	CE Espanya	13	448	398	137	85	226	593	794
675	SC Requena	13	478	398	132	109	237	497	760
676	CF Montañesa	8	296	397	104	85	107	314	341
677	CD Subiza	10	359	397	99	100	160	471	619
678	CD Plus Ultra	10	346	397	107	76	163	410	562
679	CP Monesterio	10	382	396	105	87	190	380	624
680	Adra CF	14	418	395	169	63	186	602	680
681	AD Guíxols	11	406	395	129	88	189	671	813
682	Marina de Cudeyo CF	10	384	394	136	104	144	445	477
683	CD Arguineguín	10	386	394	138	90	158	472	543
684	CD Baztán	11	401	393	112	97	192	517	694
685	Baeza CF	9	350	392	125	92	133	424	454
686	AD Campillo	11	422	391	117	123	182	452	573
687	SD Gama	11	422	391	113	83	226	422	756
688	CD Lorca	14	410	390	164	62	184	711	769
689	Club Santiago	18	496	390	150	95	251	762	1079
690	Real Sociedad C	8	282	389	101	86	95	363	338
691	CD Villaralbo	7	268	388	111	55	102	358	384
692	CA Almería	12	342	387	174	41	127	740	548
693	Club Calzada	16	460	387	154	79	227	726	884
694	Real Burgos CF	10	367	386	129	92	146	521	503
695	CD Móstoles URJC	7	244	385	103	76	65	328	245
696	CD Bupolsa	9	329	385	97	94	138	358	425
697	CD Calamonte	10	362	385	106	90	166	445	636
698	Cádiz CF	11	314	384	169	46	99	657	476
699	CF Unión Viera	8	280	384	109	57	114	408	424
700	SD Solares-Medio Cudeyo	10	362	384	97	93	172	375	529
701	UB Lebrijana	8	295	383	103	74	118	349	409
702	CD Utrillas	12	456	382	129	113	214	488	761
703	CD Vicálvaro	12	468	380	119	118	231	486	719
704	L'Entregu CF	8	280	373	101	70	109	308	339
705	Ayrón CF	10	382	373	111	100	171	384	554
706	AD Adra	10	380	372	117	84	179	416	574
707	Aviaco Madrileño CF	12	380	371	133	105	142	596	581
708	CD Brea	8	289	371	106	53	130	349	453
709	CD Soledad	16	424	370	146	71	207	633	802
710	Rayo Vallecano	11	310	369	158	53	99	623	460
711	Cerdanyola del Vallès FC	8	283	368	92	92	99	340	362
712	Ordizia KE	13	386	367	135	82	169	604	719
713	CD Buñol	11	394	367	105	103	186	408	605
714	Caselas FC	9	344	366	112	71	161	450	562
715	AD Cartaya	9	347	366	90	96	161	371	532
716	CA Ibañés	8	285	364	89	97	99	324	350
717	CCD Alberite	13	473	364	92	96	285	435	974
718	El Palmar CF	8	272	363	98	69	105	388	379
719	CD Toledo B	8	304	363	101	60	143	350	426
720	Alcázar CF	13	414	363	140	85	189	611	754
721	CD Alaquàs	10	374	361	123	106	145	392	470
722	CD Almoradí	13	448	361	130	73	245	571	904
723	UCAM Murcia CF	5	186	360	110	30	46	363	176
724	FC Lalueza	9	344	360	95	86	163	365	544
725	Burgos CF Promesas	8	287	359	95	74	118	316	380
726	CD La Cava	12	430	359	159	73	198	614	729
727	CD Juventud del Círculo Católico	12	372	358	147	64	161	591	613
728	Real Oviedo	4	152	357	113	24	15	332	86
729	UD San Fernando	6	205	357	103	48	54	342	220
730	AD Orcasitas	7	276	357	101	67	108	326	354
731	Palencia CF	8	304	355	146	63	95	412	312
732	CD Ciudad de Vícar (Note: Includes CF Huercalense' participations)	9	344	355	103	80	161	399	548
733	SD Leioa	6	228	354	95	69	64	273	241
734	Manchego CF	6	226	353	97	62	67	279	225
735	Lorca FC	6	208	352	103	46	59	355	233
736	La Unión CF (Note: Includes FC Puente Tocinos' participations)	7	256	350	98	56	102	355	365
737	CD Unión Sur Yaiza	7	270	350	96	62	112	312	349
738	CD Mallén	11	418	350	104	110	204	408	683
739	AD Llerenense	12	438	350	107	112	219	434	756
740	Santfeliuenc FC	8	287	349	91	76	120	329	371
741	CE Esporles	11	401	349	91	96	214	421	711
742	Muro CF	6	238	348	97	57	84	318	294
743	UD Los Llanos de Aridane	9	353	346	114	89	150	437	497
744	CD Cebrereña	10	374	346	85	91	198	406	683
745	Huracán Valencia CF	7	270	345	89	78	103	313	336
746	Laracha CF	8	306	345	89	78	139	312	407
747	Vandalia Industrial CF	8	306	345	90	78	138	309	404
748	UE Porreres	12	394	345	131	83	180	552	696
749	Sanvicenteño FC	11	420	345	111	101	208	426	746
750	Atlético Arona CF	9	342	342	97	90	155	400	575
751	CF Pollença	10	352	341	97	85	170	386	577
752	CD Villegas	13	461	341	86	83	292	397	1032
753	CD Molinense	8	308	340	87	79	142	363	480
754	Arucas CF	9	340	338	106	82	152	421	491
755	CD Unión Tejina	10	380	337	127	83	170	457	580
756	CD Teguise	7	270	333	83	84	103	285	356
757	SD Ceuta	10	254	331	151	29	74	620	373
758	CF Borriol	7	276	331	84	79	113	325	359
759	CD La Oliva	7	268	331	88	67	113	306	371
760	CDJ Peralta	10	382	331	101	81	200	459	712
761	SC Uxama	11	422	330	94	101	227	394	744
762	UD Pájara Playas de Jandía	5	195	329	98	46	51	301	198
763	CD Cieza (1940–1951)	13	388	329	139	51	198	599	826
764	CD Santa Úrsula	7	246	328	84	76	86	306	319
765	UD Fuengirola Los Boliches	7	272	328	92	52	128	333	434
766	CP Valdivia	10	364	328	82	82	200	340	624
767	CF Lorca Deportiva (1969–1994)	8	304	327	123	81	100	386	337
768	CP Sanvicenteño	8	304	327	88	63	153	322	512
769	CD Dolores	9	342	326	105	81	156	383	488
770	Olivenza FC	8	288	326	81	83	124	327	436
771	CD Piedrabuena	8	302	325	83	76	143	321	479
772	CD Linares (1952–1964)	10	284	324	144	36	104	564	408
773	CE Sabadell FC	8	222	322	127	43	52	436	226
774	CD Robres	7	253	322	85	67	101	294	319
775	Silva SD	7	245	321	86	63	96	294	333
776	CD Bullense	7	241	320	82	74	85	277	309
777	Palencia CF (1960–1986)	10	288	319	135	52	101	596	433
778	CD Doramas	7	268	319	79	82	107	286	333
779	CD Toreno	9	348	318	109	100	139	404	483
780	Ciudad Rodrigo CF	13	426	318	122	65	239	610	1020
781	Algemesí CF	9	340	317	114	89	137	382	456
782	RCD Ribert	7	263	316	93	84	86	327	334
783	CD Puigreig	11	362	315	123	71	168	616	736
784	AD Ciudad de Plasencia	8	306	314	82	68	156	329	532
785	CF Torre Levante	6	234	313	80	73	81	254	251
786	CD Colindres	10	380	313	92	95	193	355	651
787	CF Lorca Deportiva	4	142	312	97	21	24	292	105
788	San Fernando CD	4	158	312	92	36	30	306	143
789	AD Huracán	7	275	312	78	78	119	309	398
790	UD Tijarafe	7	273	312	84	63	126	318	409
791	Villarreal CF B	4	160	311	90	41	29	275	131
792	Granada CF	5	164	311	92	40	32	281	139
793	AD Fundación Logroñés	5	175	311	94	29	52	371	254
794	Atlético Benamiel CF	9	348	311	113	85	150	378	487
795	CD Urroztarra	8	304	311	94	61	149	410	529
796	Cartagena FC B	10	378	311	108	99	171	421	578
797	UD Talavera	8	304	311	80	71	153	280	447
798	CF Motril	5	179	309	91	36	52	319	221
799	CD Fuentes	7	270	309	85	54	131	340	459
800	CD Valdefierro	8	290	309	85	58	147	301	471
801	Callosa Deportiva CF	13	436	309	113	85	238	567	962
802	Atlético Palma del Río	8	310	307	114	79	117	364	378
803	CF Talavera de la Reina	4	152	306	89	39	24	298	129
804	Real Juvencia	14	332	305	121	63	148	623	675
805	AD Noáin	9	346	303	98	74	174	324	471
806	CD Roldán	7	264	301	119	57	88	403	321
807	Hernán Cortés CF	8	304	301	109	75	120	429	468
808	CD Calvià	10	382	301	105	91	186	468	653
809	CD Villarrobledo	9	274	300	122	56	96	451	377
810	UD Aspense	9	326	300	105	90	131	375	428
811	UD Cacabelense	10	384	300	112	76	196	438	686
812	CD Universidad de Zaragoza	5	192	299	86	44	62	336	242
813	SD Buelna	9	342	299	85	66	191	349	625
814	CF Llíria	7	254	296	106	59	89	370	322
815	Santa Comba CF	6	224	296	79	59	86	262	287
816	El Entrego CD	10	364	295	108	79	177	397	582
817	CD Pedroñeras	7	248	294	73	75	100	251	310
818	UC Villalba	8	318	294	79	60	179	294	579
819	CA Roda de Barà	7	268	292	94	75	99	322	333
820	Paiporta CF	9	328	292	101	76	151	401	540
821	CD Montcada	11	370	292	110	72	188	574	776
822	CD El Cotillo	6	230	291	79	54	97	285	352
823	EDMF Churra	6	210	290	80	50	80	270	277
824	CD Vera de Almería	8	291	288	77	71	143	326	485
825	UD Canals	10	334	286	93	100	141	391	488
826	ACD Tarazona	9	276	285	121	43	112	499	523
827	CD Ribadumia	6	224	284	75	59	90	278	317
828	CD Lebrija	7	270	283	106	71	93	356	318
829	CD Villacañas (1971–1996)	8	306	282	90	87	129	336	439
830	AgD Ceuta	7	264	280	107	66	91	347	298
831	Ferreras CF	8	310	280	106	68	136	428	457
832	UD Barbadás	6	228	278	70	68	90	242	297
833	UD El Entrego	8	228	277	122	33	73	501	359
834	Urraca CF	7	242	277	66	79	97	276	313
835	CD Grove	6	228	277	71	64	93	270	336
836	UD Sámano	7	247	277	81	53	113	279	374
837	SD Burela	7	266	276	93	82	91	330	334
838	SR Boetticher y Navarro	9	300	276	106	64	130	429	503
839	CDFC La Calzada	8	282	276	72	60	150	316	524
840	Albacete Balompié B (1972–1994)	8	302	274	99	76	127	373	399
841	CF Cullera	9	296	274	90	70	136	394	498
842	CA Universitario	10	258	273	120	33	105	575	477
843	Vallecas CF	7	268	272	80	66	122	293	402
844	CD San Roque	6	234	270	71	57	106	286	357
845	Real Betis	7	208	269	118	33	57	520	301
846	SD Escoriaza	9	250	268	115	38	97	580	476
847	Flavia SD	9	342	267	84	93	165	285	460
848	CD Almería	7	206	266	115	36	55	357	216
849	UD Ciudad de Torredonjimeno	5	177	264	74	42	61	287	239
850	CA Cordobés	10	302	264	105	54	143	516	559
851	Sporting La Gineta CF	6	228	264	69	57	102	259	329
852	Pontevedra CF B	7	254	263	80	63	111	286	323
853	Universidad de Las Palmas CF B	6	231	263	70	53	108	264	341
854	CD Colunga	6	208	261	74	39	95	238	299
855	FC La Unión Atlético	6	212	260	69	53	90	255	276
856	Club San Ignacio	7	244	260	60	80	104	254	346
857	UD Huesca	10	240	258	109	41	90	489	412
858	UD Melilla (1943–1956)	8	204	257	115	27	62	458	308
859	SD Narcea	6	228	257	63	68	97	227	325
860	UCAM Murcia CF B	5	172	256	71	43	58	259	200
861	AD Villaviciosa de Odón	6	232	256	65	61	106	226	328
862	CF Briviesca Norpetrol	8	310	256	86	80	144	355	521
863	CD Corralejo	4	157	255	69	48	40	200	150
864	UD Juventud Barrio del Cristo	6	238	255	62	69	107	238	319
865	CD La Cuadra	6	209	254	67	53	89	224	290
866	UD Llanera	5	168	253	72	37	59	245	229
867	CD Los Yébenes	8	306	252	86	71	149	342	537
868	Andés CF	7	266	251	61	68	137	236	446
869	CD Badajoz	3	114	249	74	27	13	251	73
870	CF Hospitalet Isla Blanca	7	268	249	86	77	105	302	376
871	FC Andorra	6	228	247	84	64	80	302	297
872	Real Murcia CF	4	150	245	93	31	26	298	112
873	Atlético Burgalés	5	192	245	91	42	59	275	202
874	CD Brenes	7	272	245	86	73	113	297	393
875	CP Cacereño B	6	230	245	67	44	119	261	414
876	Hellín Deportivo (1919–1960)	8	228	244	106	32	90	511	397
877	Guadix CF	5	198	244	64	52	82	248	318
878	Balón de Cádiz CF	9	274	243	93	57	124	397	406
879	CD Bolañego	8	280	242	70	59	151	239	504
880	CD Los Boliches	6	234	240	88	58	88	309	303
881	CD Jávea	7	250	240	83	74	93	280	287
882	SD Alsasua	8	304	240	78	84	142	324	460
883	AD Arganda CF	8	304	239	77	76	151	359	505
884	Zorroza FC	6	228	237	68	66	94	249	303
885	CF Panadería Pulido	5	168	236	64	44	60	263	242
886	CA Iberia	7	236	236	95	46	95	423	433
887	Alicante CF B	5	198	236	62	50	86	206	267
888	CD Villanueva del Arzobispo	6	232	234	93	50	89	296	314
889	Real Valladolid	9	164	233	98	37	29	389	188
890	CA Arteixo	4	152	233	64	41	47	209	161
891	UD Artiguense	8	264	232	92	48	124	500	592
892	CD Astorga	10	312	232	86	60	166	412	691
893	CD Belchite 97	6	209	231	54	69	86	187	275
894	CF Unión Antigua	5	192	229	60	52	80	213	265
895	CA Tarazona	6	226	229	55	64	107	216	332
896	Penya Ciutadella Esportiva	5	190	228	62	42	86	218	283
897	Club Santa Catalina Atlético	6	211	228	60	48	103	222	314
898	CD Universidad de Valladolid	7	268	228	73	64	131	319	471
899	RCD Santa Ponsa	5	190	227	60	47	83	226	239
900	AD Puebla Patria	7	268	227	79	69	120	291	379
901	Bigastro CF	6	224	226	80	66	78	268	259
902	CD Cultural Areas	6	224	226	58	52	114	249	384
903	Deportivo Alavés C	5	190	225	56	57	77	203	226
904	CP Amanecer	6	230	225	56	57	117	226	373
905	UD Tegueste	5	192	224	58	50	84	206	263
906	Monóvar CD	9	300	224	76	72	152	325	571
907	CD Atlético Paso	6	211	223	62	61	88	239	288
908	CD Motril	7	266	223	82	61	123	275	363
909	CD Ramales	7	270	223	74	77	119	267	402
910	Real Sporting San José	6	228	222	68	56	104	267	365
911	AD Almería	5	188	221	91	39	58	288	193
912	CF Promesas de Ponferrada	3	114	221	63	32	19	172	78
913	Lorca Deportiva CF (Note: Including CD Balsicas' participations.)	4	152	221	66	26	60	240	193
914	CD Cala d'Or	6	230	221	71	58	101	267	422
915	CD Guijuelo	3	114	220	64	28	22	195	90
916	CD La Roda	7	270	219	72	75	123	296	418
917	CD Calatayud	6	228	218	84	52	92	287	337
918	Unión Estepona CF	4	154	217	67	26	61	224	205
919	UCAM Murcia CF (1999–2005)	5	194	216	57	45	92	238	284
920	CD Alcorisa	7	266	216	81	54	131	340	489
921	CD Mijas	7	270	216	77	64	129	292	442
922	CD Aguilar	7	268	216	52	67	149	250	514
923	Beti Kozkor K.E.	4	129	215	56	47	26	172	131
924	CD Fuencarral	5	200	215	63	53	84	273	327
925	Marín CF	9	274	214	82	50	142	356	556
926	CD Santa Fe	5	190	213	56	45	89	197	292
927	Foios CD	6	220	213	61	58	101	209	305
928	UD San Antonio	7	272	213	71	58	143	332	477
929	UE Llagostera	3	116	212	62	26	28	198	109
930	CA Victoria	5	180	212	57	41	82	201	272
931	SDC Mindoniense	6	228	212	63	70	95	219	321
932	CD Guadalcacín	5	200	212	51	59	90	182	298
933	CD Imperio de Albolote	6	232	212	53	53	126	202	356
934	CF Rápid	8	300	212	53	53	194	253	645
935	CD Buzanada	5	169	211	57	40	72	191	237
936	CD Ciudad de Lucena	4	135	210	59	33	43	205	164
937	CD San Adrián	6	228	209	73	63	92	251	285
938	CD Lagun Artea	5	184	209	54	47	83	209	295
939	Silla CF	5	172	208	53	49	70	189	212
940	CF Escatrón	7	224	207	71	48	105	292	420
941	CD El Álamo	7	254	207	58	63	133	277	442
942	Racing de Santander	4	126	205	91	23	12	351	96
943	UE Poble Sec	7	222	205	80	45	97	402	487
944	Ciudad de Lorca CF (Note: Includes Cartagena Promesas CF's participations)	5	190	205	60	30	100	242	393
945	CD Tedeón	7	257	205	51	52	154	231	540
946	Club Asturias	6	228	204	71	62	95	203	270
947	UD Tamaraceite	5	180	204	60	51	69	241	319
948	Torreagüera CF	6	228	204	70	64	94	259	338
949	CD Larramendi	7	234	204	68	68	98	268	359
950	UD Melilla B (2006–2014)	5	192	204	53	46	93	201	316
951	Hércules CF	7	142	203	85	33	24	312	128
952	CD Femsa	7	226	203	79	45	102	383	442
953	Atlético La Zubia	6	234	203	72	59	103	278	376
954	CD Peña Azagresa	6	211	203	52	47	112	249	374
955	CD Palencia	8	198	202	86	31	81	380	350
956	SD Euskalduna	7	214	202	80	42	92	351	343
957	CD Rincón	4	160	202	55	37	68	195	235
958	UD Roteña	6	238	202	66	56	116	241	372
959	Cartagena CF	11	172	201	90	21	61	387	256
960	Úbeda CF (1947–1959)	7	202	201	83	35	84	336	367
961	CD Guardo	7	268	201	76	49	143	304	475
962	CD Ibiza Islas Pitiusas	3	93	200	59	23	11	182	58
963	CF Molina	5	178	200	54	38	86	215	287
964	Tyde FC	6	228	200	73	54	101	246	329
965	SD Urola KE	5	190	199	62	51	77	245	268
966	Aravaca CF	5	196	198	48	54	94	215	339
967	CP Guareña	7	266	198	58	50	158	248	542
968	Nules CF	5	184	197	69	59	56	253	203
969	Larache CF	9	236	197	82	33	121	393	570
970	CD Isla Cristina	3	122	196	62	33	27	222	120
971	Puente Genil FC	4	135	196	49	49	37	184	163
972	CD Aurrerá de Vitoria B	5	190	195	46	57	87	165	239
973	CD Huétor Vega	5	177	194	49	47	81	211	285
974	CP Talayuela	7	268	194	69	56	143	281	566
975	Polideportivo Ejido B	4	135	193	61	34	40	195	131
976	Riotinto Balompié (1932–1969)	8	236	193	74	47	115	297	472
977	CD San Serván	5	190	192	77	38	75	238	234
978	CD Mirandés B	5	171	192	48	48	75	175	244
979	Pelayo CF	8	240	192	73	46	121	325	487
980	UD Orensana	6	156	191	87	21	48	356	244
981	UD Las Palmas C	4	130	191	52	35	43	173	136
982	JD Somorrostro	4	134	191	48	47	39	191	156
983	CD Cariñena	5	182	191	49	49	84	236	338
984	CD Erriberri	5	192	191	48	47	97	153	286
985	CD Diocesano	4	130	190	52	34	44	177	152
986	CD Calahorra B	5	167	190	52	34	81	187	303
987	UD Aretxabaleta	6	228	190	56	64	108	204	347
988	CD Guadiana	5	190	188	48	44	98	188	331
989	CD Felanitx (1932–1971)	7	190	187	74	39	77	335	345
990	CD Roda	4	132	186	48	42	42	155	148
991	Sporting Quintanar de la Orden	5	192	186	63	60	69	232	264
992	Abarán CF (Note: Includes Atlético Abarán's participations)	4	152	186	51	33	68	203	269
993	FC Cartagena B	4	134	185	47	44	43	180	156
994	SFC Minerva	4	138	185	49	41	48	186	190
995	CD Fuensalida	5	194	185	60	65	69	222	246
996	CD Soledad	4	154	185	52	29	73	207	264
997	CD Betxí	5	184	184	62	60	62	215	197
998	Salamanca CF UDS	3	114	183	52	27	35	186	136
999	CD El Ejido 2012	3	105	183	54	21	30	180	135
1000	CD Villacarrillo CF	4	156	183	49	36	71	205	230
1001	Xerez Deportivo FC	3	95	182	52	26	17	130	65
1002	CF Recambios Colón	5	172	181	44	49	79	167	231
1003	CD Villacañas	5	168	181	47	40	81	176	250
1004	CP Racing Valverdeño	7	252	181	47	50	155	243	565
1005	Ribadeo FC	5	186	180	48	39	99	219	381
1006	CF Atlético Ciudad	3	114	178	49	34	31	171	143
1007	Porto Cristo FC	6	228	178	67	44	117	256	357
1008	CF Industrial Melilla	6	228	177	59	59	110	235	371
1009	Cehegín CF	6	228	177	53	64	111	226	382
1010	UD Tomares	4	152	176	45	41	66	166	214
1011	CD Oliver Urrutia	5	192	176	46	45	101	207	320
1012	San Martín CF Vilaxoán	6	228	176	56	64	108	201	334
1013	Barbate CF	8	228	176	71	36	121	330	504
1014	CD Málaga	9	124	175	77	21	26	314	137
1015	CP San Cristóbal	5	173	175	52	41	80	220	267
1016	CAP Ciudad de Murcia	5	172	175	47	37	88	174	264
1017	Casalarreina CF	5	168	175	51	22	95	198	345
1018	CD Segarra	5	150	173	75	23	52	321	242
1019	Peñarroya CF	7	196	172	75	22	99	375	460
1020	SD Torina	5	172	172	49	40	83	196	284
1021	CD Zarautz	5	190	172	43	52	95	165	268
1022	CD Sigüenza	4	152	171	44	39	69	154	229
1023	Real Titánico (1912–1962)	8	216	171	69	33	114	344	498
1024	SD Unión África Ceutí	9	276	171	56	59	161	281	523
1025	CD La Muela	2	76	170	52	14	10	159	56
1026	UD Los Garres	4	134	170	41	47	46	155	165
1027	CD Naval de Cartagena	6	184	170	69	32	83	342	387
1028	Trasmiera FC	4	152	170	43	41	68	148	201
1029	CDU Criptanense	5	192	170	44	46	102	171	308
1030	UD Díter Zafra	5	154	169	68	33	53	273	216
1031	Deportivo Maestranza Aérea Logroño	6	162	169	69	31	62	351	299
1032	CD Almazora	4	148	169	50	46	52	154	174
1033	Orihuela CF B	5	178	169	52	65	61	194	217
1034	UD Cerdanyola de Mataró	4	154	169	49	45	60	219	249
1035	FC Cartagena	2	69	168	52	12	5	205	47
1036	CD Artístico San Marcelino	4	154	168	42	42	70	180	234
1037	UD Toresana	5	190	168	66	36	88	227	322
1038	Mutxamel CF	5	192	166	49	55	88	201	275
1039	Villena CF	6	176	165	68	29	79	369	412
1040	SD Olímpica Valverdeña	6	186	165	66	33	87	300	376
1041	CD Tenerife Aficionados	5	192	163	59	45	88	255	302
1042	CP Alburquerque	4	154	163	41	40	73	179	242
1043	AD Tarancón	5	188	163	60	43	85	240	306
1044	Peña Deportiva Soriano	7	196	163	67	29	100	354	429
1045	Club Berbés	7	170	162	69	29	72	412	413
1046	Castilleja CF	4	144	162	43	33	68	165	211
1047	AD Ceuta	2	80	161	47	20	13	150	68
1048	CA Cartagena	6	188	161	59	43	86	265	328
1049	UD Las Torres	5	190	161	52	59	79	213	301
1050	SD Lagunak	5	192	161	45	44	103	175	308
1051	CA Cortegana	4	160	160	53	47	60	195	209
1052	CD Alberca	5	190	160	54	52	84	188	280
1053	Toscal CF	5	190	160	60	40	90	228	322
1054	CD Son Cladera	4	154	159	42	33	79	134	257
1055	SD Águilas Atlético de Adeje	5	196	159	56	43	97	222	352
1056	CA Valtierrano	5	190	159	39	42	109	179	374
1057	CD Cieza (1931–1936)	9	206	159	66	29	111	326	546
1058	Unionistas de Salamanca CF	2	76	158	47	17	12	149	63
1059	CD Isleño	5	192	158	57	44	91	203	298
1060	CD Malgrat	5	190	158	59	40	91	232	329
1061	UD Pilas	4	158	157	54	49	55	179	163
1062	AD Atlético Escalerillas	4	154	157	41	34	79	172	248
1063	CF Unión Carrizal	4	152	157	39	40	73	175	268
1064	CD Talavera	7	180	157	66	25	89	366	469
1065	RD Gijonés	8	137	156	66	24	47	300	241
1066	CD Hernán Cortés	4	154	156	39	39	76	127	235
1067	AD San José Rinconada	3	118	155	40	35	43	155	150
1068	EMD Aceuchal	4	129	155	42	29	58	143	174
1069	EI San Martín	4	128	155	37	44	47	146	181
1070	CD Lumbreras (1969–1983)	5	194	155	37	44	113	167	357
1071	UD Santa Bárbara	7	232	155	50	45	137	254	535
1072	SG Lucense	6	142	154	69	16	57	336	264
1073	UD Alcampell	3	116	154	41	34	41	172	162
1074	AD Cotillas CF	4	145	154	39	43	63	139	194
1075	CD Moguer	5	196	154	55	46	95	181	287
1076	CD Giner Torrero	4	152	154	43	25	84	164	292
1077	CD Ses Salines	5	190	154	57	40	93	229	358
1078	CFJ Mollerussa	4	152	153	54	45	53	207	226
1079	Jumilla CF (1941–1968)	5	150	152	61	30	59	239	235
1080	CD Alhameño	3	118	151	41	28	49	156	175
1081	CA Riveira	5	190	151	47	57	86	171	258
1082	Córdoba CF	4	114	150	70	10	34	247	134
1083	Valdesoto CF	6	218	150	34	50	134	180	419
1084	CD Tenerife	3	114	149	63	23	28	203	86
1085	CD Cox	4	148	149	55	39	54	162	185
1086	CA Calvo Sotelo	4	144	147	61	25	58	259	222
1087	CE Sallent	4	146	147	65	17	64	298	323
1088	Calvo Sotelo Puertollano CF	3	92	146	41	23	28	127	93
1089	CD Quintanar (1961–1977)	4	144	146	55	36	53	220	222
1090	UD Marinaleda	3	114	146	39	29	46	127	145
1091	Club Xuventú Sanxenxo	4	154	146	38	32	84	158	258
1092	Noya SD	5	190	146	46	54	90	153	284
1093	AD Caravaca	5	180	146	36	38	106	162	370
1094	CD Cenicero	5	189	146	36	38	115	172	391
1095	UD España	5	146	145	60	25	61	299	282
1096	UD Ourense	3	99	145	39	28	32	122	123
1097	Crevillente Industrial CF	5	150	145	60	25	65	269	310
1098	CD Torreperogil	4	135	145	39	35	61	120	185
1099	CD Santa Marta	4	154	145	39	28	87	154	258
1100	CE Artà	5	190	145	45	42	103	217	384
1101	UD Fuerteventura	3	99	144	46	28	25	117	91
1102	Los Villares CF	3	114	144	38	30	46	125	149
1103	CF Ciudad de Alfaro	5	190	144	36	36	118	167	378
1104	CE Alberic	4	152	143	47	43	62	152	197
1105	Atlético Teresiano	4	152	142	38	28	86	166	274
1106	CP Salas	5	190	142	55	32	103	222	368
1107	CD Gallur	6	164	141	62	17	85	279	323
1108	CD Cuatro Caminos	7	190	141	55	31	104	305	471
1109	CD Palencia Balompié	2	76	140	39	23	14	126	62
1110	CE Sabadell FC B	3	114	140	35	35	44	137	153
1111	Motilla CF	4	150	140	51	38	61	193	215
1112	Español CF	6	156	140	59	22	75	269	358
1113	Logroñés CF	2	78	139	39	22	17	116	68
1114	CP Malpartida	5	192	139	51	37	104	243	381
1115	UD Almería	2	76	138	49	19	8	149	49
1116	Polvorín FC	3	93	138	40	18	35	146	109
1117	UD Manilva-Sabinillas	3	118	138	34	36	48	150	171
1118	UD Cassà	3	114	138	33	39	42	146	171
1119	RCD Córdoba	6	117	137	57	23	37	232	149
1120	Mazarrón FC	3	96	137	38	23	35	120	120
1121	FE Figueres	3	114	137	36	29	49	126	148
1122	Recreativo Bailén CF	4	152	136	43	50	59	187	231
1123	CD Alone	3	124	136	37	25	62	129	197
1124	Atlético Unión Güímar	4	134	135	30	45	59	162	225
1125	CF Trujillo	4	134	135	37	31	66	150	223
1126	UD Gomera	5	196	135	44	44	108	171	346
1127	Serrallo CF	4	156	134	30	47	79	125	268
1128	CD Fabero	5	190	134	45	44	101	203	353
1129	UD Teror Balompié	3	121	133	32	37	52	136	183
1130	CD San Gregorio Arrabal	3	116	133	36	25	55	128	194
1131	CD Valdepeñas	5	156	133	56	21	79	254	366
1132	Lorca FC B	2	76	132	38	18	20	138	82
1133	CA Morón Balompié	4	126	132	57	18	51	214	205
1134	CD Llosa	3	120	132	31	39	50	132	169
1135	CP Monteresma	4	152	132	45	42	65	176	214
1136	CG Mercantil	4	148	132	60	12	76	260	313
1137	Atlético Coín	4	158	132	46	40	72	202	270
1138	CD Atlético Tomelloso	3	114	131	33	32	49	134	162
1139	Club Atlético Espeleño	3	118	131	35	26	57	161	212
1140	CD Molinense (1971–1987)	4	152	131	42	47	63	159	229
1141	CD Génova	4	144	131	33	32	79	182	315
1142	CD Mejoreño	4	158	131	36	38	84	164	308
1143	UD Esplugues	4	156	130	45	40	71	168	244
1144	UD Benigànim	4	130	130	33	31	66	134	225
1145	Real Tapia CF	4	152	130	31	37	84	141	239
1146	Montañeros CF	2	76	129	35	24	17	116	80
1147	Santaella CF	4	152	128	50	28	74	167	245
1148	UDA Gramenet B	3	114	126	32	30	52	136	186
1149	AD Cerro del Águila	3	116	126	33	27	56	112	166
1150	CD Nerja	4	152	126	39	37	76	151	254
1151	UD Alginet	5	170	126	49	28	93	198	330
1152	CD Dorneda	3	114	125	33	26	55	108	158
1153	CD Abarán (1948–1967)	4	120	124	53	21	46	230	183
1154	CD Tarancón	3	92	124	36	16	40	124	129
1155	Real Unión B	3	114	124	32	28	54	121	165
1156	CD Herrera	4	158	124	44	36	78	182	256
1157	Cuéllar CF	3	114	123	30	33	51	144	211
1158	CD Adrianense	4	150	123	46	31	73	239	339
1159	CD Nava	2	74	122	35	17	22	117	94
1160	Guadix CF (1954–1960)	4	126	121	55	13	58	229	245
1161	Xerez CD B	3	114	121	30	31	53	133	157
1162	FC Villanueva del Pardillo	3	108	121	31	28	49	95	139
1163	UD Carboneras	5	192	121	32	29	131	156	467
1164	CD Cobeña	2	76	120	34	18	24	102	85
1165	Aloñamendi KE	3	114	120	31	37	46	138	174
1166	RSD Santa Isabel	4	152	120	32	33	87	144	272
1167	CF Belmonte	3	114	119	31	26	57	137	222
1168	CD Mosteiro	3	114	118	31	34	49	110	149
1169	CD Carranque	3	114	118	31	28	55	107	174
1170	CD Alagón	3	116	118	29	31	56	142	218
1171	Flavia SD (1949–1963)	5	154	118	50	18	86	225	353
1172	CD Manufacturas Metálicas Madrileñas	4	130	117	44	29	57	210	218
1173	SDC Michelín	4	152	117	42	33	77	180	239
1174	UD San Lorenzo de El Escorial	6	170	117	45	27	98	269	462
1175	Peña Balsamaiso CF	4	152	117	30	30	92	157	353
1176	CD Balsicas	3	114	116	32	20	62	138	226
1177	Atlético Algeciras	4	118	115	48	19	51	142	151
1178	UD Girod	5	130	115	49	17	64	219	270
1179	Juventud CF	3	90	114	49	16	25	235	139
1180	Sporting Cabanillas FC	3	114	114	30	24	60	110	193
1181	UD San Lorenzo de Flumen	3	116	114	30	24	62	116	219
1182	CD San Pedro de Ponferrada	6	188	114	46	24	118	205	442
1183	AD Ferroviaria	8	132	113	45	23	64	271	311
1184	Nalón CF	3	114	113	27	32	55	151	223
1185	Sant Cugat CE	4	146	113	40	33	73	178	276
1186	SDC Coyanza	4	152	113	37	39	76	169	273
1187	CD Miengo	2	76	112	29	25	22	92	65
1188	Puente Genil CF (1939–1960)	4	120	112	50	12	58	201	254
1189	UD Fornacense	4	152	112	38	30	84	156	289
1190	CF Reus Deportiu B	2	78	110	29	23	26	98	91
1191	CA Tacoronte	3	93	109	29	22	42	103	131
1192	La Roda CF (1959–1968)	5	150	109	40	29	81	184	352
1193	Atzeneta UE	2	66	108	31	15	20	88	64
1194	AD Hellín	3	114	108	41	26	47	126	134
1195	CF Calamocha	3	94	108	28	24	42	102	131
1196	CD Cieza Promesas	3	114	107	39	29	46	124	163
1197	CD Fortuna	3	118	107	26	29	63	119	191
1198	UD Rotlet Molinar	3	114	107	29	20	65	125	252
1199	UD Frexnense	3	114	106	34	21	59	130	198
1200	AD San Juan Zaragoza	3	100	104	28	20	52	82	162
1201	Blanca CF	4	145	104	26	26	93	127	299
1202	UD Agaete	2	78	103	28	19	31	110	124
1203	CD I'Gara	3	114	103	36	31	47	124	173
1204	UD Esperanza	3	116	103	24	31	61	118	212
1205	CA Prieguense	4	118	102	40	22	56	143	172
1206	CD Parque Móvil	4	120	102	42	18	60	186	230
1207	CA Muleño	4	152	102	36	30	86	132	284
1208	SD San Martín	5	190	102	30	30	130	144	392
1209	Real Zaragoza	5	84	101	42	17	25	224	134
1210	Atlético Madrileño CF Aficionado	3	114	101	37	27	50	147	167
1211	CD Yeclano	4	108	101	47	7	54	212	250
1212	CE Xilvar	4	152	101	33	35	84	134	280
1213	Atlético Pedro Muñoz	4	152	101	31	39	82	139	321
1214	Puebla FC	3	114	100	34	32	48	121	156
1215	Real Unión Tenerife	3	114	100	37	26	51	169	210
1216	Calpe CF	3	110	100	40	20	50	122	261
1217	CP Moraleja	4	152	100	24	28	100	147	378
1218	Granada 74 CF	1	42	99	30	9	3	87	20
1219	SD Marchena Balompié	3	96	99	38	23	35	173	163
1220	Ciudad de Murcia B	2	76	99	23	30	23	83	84
1221	CD La Unión (1945–1975)	3	106	99	38	23	45	131	154
1222	Vilamarxant CF	3	94	99	25	24	45	107	149
1223	Berrón CF	3	114	99	27	28	59	106	180
1224	Hércules CF B	3	94	98	24	26	44	87	118
1225	Garray CF	3	114	98	23	29	62	88	190
1226	CD Aspense	5	144	98	42	14	88	204	414
1227	CF Ollería	3	102	97	31	35	36	98	103
1228	SD Begoña	5	136	97	37	23	76	187	250
1229	CD Español del Alquián	3	114	97	29	14	71	122	251
1230	AD San Miguel	3	114	96	33	30	51	103	152
1231	CD Algar (1970–1994)	3	114	96	33	30	51	121	178
1232	Real Avilés CF B	2	76	95	24	23	29	97	108
1233	UD Canovellas	3	114	95	35	25	54	145	173
1234	Puente Genil CF (1983–1995)	3	118	95	32	33	53	97	167
1235	CD Arenas de Frajanas	3	114	95	26	17	71	112	255
1236	CD Santa Ponsa	2	76	94	34	26	16	110	88
1237	UD Jaca	4	128	94	41	14	73	194	286
1238	SD Villaescusa	3	112	94	23	25	64	89	183
1239	UD Pueblo Nuevo	3	110	93	36	21	53	180	239
1240	Rute CF	3	116	93	30	33	53	133	226
1241	CF Intercity	2	52	92	24	20	8	82	44
1242	CE Sant Celoni	3	116	92	39	14	63	197	285
1243	CD Aceuchal	4	152	92	28	36	88	128	281
1244	CSD Arzúa	2	61	91	26	13	22	89	72
1245	CD Roces	3	114	91	21	28	65	85	173
1246	Santa Marina CF	5	150	91	33	25	92	160	338
1247	Pedro Muñoz CF	5	152	91	30	31	91	131	351
1248	San Javier CF	3	94	90	39	12	43	163	160
1249	UD Paiosaco	3	99	90	20	30	49	100	168
1250	CD Miguelturreño	3	114	90	20	30	64	105	213
1251	Gimnástica de Torrelavega B	2	76	89	26	24	26	73	69
1252	CD Thader (1955–1962)	3	96	89	38	13	45	217	233
1253	UD Villa de Santa Brígida B	2	76	89	19	32	25	78	100
1254	CF Épila	2	72	89	23	20	29	83	107
1255	Arratia CD	2	76	89	22	23	31	70	99
1256	Lora CF	4	106	89	38	13	55	156	227
1257	Madrigueras CF	4	120	89	36	17	67	150	255
1258	UD Ibiza	1	38	88	27	7	4	91	17
1259	SD Fisterra	3	110	88	27	25	58	107	209
1260	Salamanca CF UDS B	2	61	87	23	18	20	71	71
1261	SD Sporting Sada	3	114	87	28	31	55	122	183
1262	UD Elda	3	96	86	37	12	47	164	241
1263	CF Cutillas Fortuna	2	74	85	23	25	26	78	84
1264	CF Palma	4	100	85	34	17	49	121	163
1265	Barinas CF	3	114	85	28	31	55	98	159
1266	SD Hulleras de Sabero	4	128	85	31	23	74	127	276
1267	CD Peñaranda de Bracamonte (1946–1989)	4	120	85	34	17	69	137	308
1268	CD O'Donnell	4	152	85	25	33	94	119	302
1269	ED Moratalaz	2	56	84	22	18	16	70	61
1270	UB Conquense B	2	76	84	23	15	38	85	129
1271	UD Cuart de Poblet	3	114	84	29	26	59	121	197
1272	Fuente Álamo CF	2	76	83	30	23	23	110	99
1273	CD Villamuriel	2	76	83	22	17	37	73	96
1274	CF Villa de Alagón	2	76	83	22	17	37	80	129
1275	UD Lucentina	3	96	83	35	13	48	133	206
1276	SD Juvenil de Ponteareas (1950–1964)	4	112	83	33	17	62	153	254
1277	CP Cabezuela	4	153	83	28	27	98	165	383
1278	SD Ciudad de Santiago	1	38	82	25	7	6	72	30
1279	CD Agut	2	84	82	31	20	33	134	146
1280	CD Peña	3	86	82	31	20	35	113	136
1281	UD Seislán	3	114	82	32	18	64	103	176
1282	CD Egabrense	3	116	82	25	32	59	106	211
1283	CD Autol	3	114	82	19	31	64	88	226
1284	CD Portillo	2	74	81	26	29	19	70	57
1285	UD Atlético Isleño	2	76	81	19	24	33	85	105
1286	UD Melilla B (1989–2004)	3	78	81	25	19	34	81	120
1287	AD Las Navas	2	76	81	21	18	37	76	128
1288	CD Altorricón	3	116	81	20	21	75	100	230
1289	Universidad de Las Palmas CF	1	38	80	23	11	4	84	35
1290	Club Sporting Guardés	2	76	80	20	20	36	72	113
1291	CD Ejido de León	3	114	80	23	34	57	109	210
1292	CD Lope de Vega	3	118	80	26	28	64	121	237
1293	Lorca Deportiva CF B	2	76	79	20	19	37	88	107
1294	CD Almansa	4	92	79	30	19	43	167	187
1295	Murallas de Ceuta FC	2	76	79	20	19	37	63	93
1296	Meirás CF	3	114	79	24	31	59	75	171
1297	CD Electromecánicas	4	118	79	28	23	67	182	321
1298	Pelayo AD	2	76	78	26	26	24	112	107
1299	Unami CP	2	76	78	21	15	40	89	131
1300	RCD Nueva Sevilla	2	78	78	20	18	40	74	122
1301	Alcantarilla CF	3	114	78	27	24	63	116	214
1302	Crevillente Deportivo (I)	5	110	78	32	14	64	171	275
1303	Flat Earth FC	2	56	77	21	17	18	58	62
1304	UD Guía	2	68	77	21	14	33	72	94
1305	UD Tavernes	3	90	76	27	22	41	138	174
1306	Deportivo Maestranza Aérea León	4	94	76	27	22	45	151	225
1307	River Melilla CF	3	118	76	21	16	81	119	280
1308	UD Gran Tarajal	2	52	75	18	21	13	75	65
1309	UD Seo de Urgel	2	84	75	29	17	38	159	174
1310	Burgos CF B	2	76	75	15	30	31	64	94
1311	Écija CF	3	88	75	32	11	45	127	162
1312	CD Benicàssim	2	80	75	17	24	39	88	141
1313	Peña Deportiva Rociera	2	80	75	19	18	43	80	148
1314	SD Santa Brígida	3	122	75	26	23	73	128	250
1315	CP Gran Maestre	3	114	75	16	27	71	108	289
1316	CD Cubas	2	76	74	26	22	28	118	108
1317	Martos CF	3	76	74	31	12	33	144	149
1318	CF San Agustín del Guadalix	2	76	74	16	26	34	80	115
1319	Moralo CF	3	92	74	27	20	45	116	190
1320	CD Foz	3	90	74	30	14	46	119	194
1321	Club Apurtuarte	3	86	73	27	21	38	121	147
1322	Mislata CF	2	80	73	19	16	45	82	144
1323	La Unión Athletic	3	114	73	19	35	60	95	196
1324	CF Mollet	4	130	73	31	11	88	163	341
1325	CD Aldeano	3	114	73	21	10	83	90	294
1326	Imperio CF	4	82	72	30	12	40	153	181
1327	CD Escolar	3	96	72	27	18	51	118	193
1328	CA Linares	5	112	72	27	20	65	152	284
1329	Agromán CF	2	72	70	28	14	30	117	112
1330	CD Mojácar	2	82	70	22	26	34	90	128
1331	CD Tineo	2	76	70	16	22	38	82	134
1332	Oiartzun KE	2	76	70	16	22	38	64	116
1333	CD Trasona	2	76	70	18	16	42	75	129
1334	CDF Tres Cantos	2	76	70	18	16	42	56	120
1335	CD Orellana	3	116	70	26	18	72	107	248
1336	SD Juvenil de Ponteareas	2	76	69	22	25	29	80	93
1337	Los Molinos CF	2	76	69	18	15	43	84	143
1338	CF Atlético Gironella	3	106	69	24	21	61	139	264
1339	CD Colonia Ofigevi	2	80	68	14	26	40	67	110
1340	CD Charco del Pino	2	79	68	15	23	41	75	128
1341	CD Atlético Rafal	2	76	68	15	23	38	79	138
1342	EFC Algar	2	80	68	18	14	48	68	139
1343	SDU Castilla de Palencia	4	108	68	27	14	67	131	304
1344	CD Unión Moral	2	76	67	25	17	34	83	106
1345	CD Los Garres	2	70	67	17	16	37	79	123
1346	CD Peñas Oscenses	2	78	67	16	19	43	72	143
1347	FE Grama	2	66	66	16	18	32	57	91
1348	CD Barrio San José	2	76	65	22	21	33	82	124
1349	CD Cambados	3	90	65	23	19	48	123	190
1350	Urduliz FT	2	54	64	16	16	22	51	56
1351	CF Noia	2	76	64	16	16	44	70	131
1352	Club Gimnástica Abad	6	104	64	26	14	64	157	311
1353	AD Ceutí Atlético	3	114	64	18	10	86	98	304
1354	CD Sonseca	2	80	63	22	19	39	100	149
1355	CD Zarramonza	2	76	63	14	21	41	62	137
1356	CD San José de Soria	2	76	63	17	12	47	65	153
1357	CA Bastetano	4	106	63	26	11	69	133	326
1358	Club Maghreb el Aksa	2	64	62	28	6	30	127	123
1359	Alcolea CF	2	76	62	20	22	34	79	110
1360	CD Logroño	5	55	61	25	11	19	116	87
1361	EF Alhama	2	68	61	14	19	35	78	125
1362	Sanlúcar CF	2	80	61	21	19	40	79	132
1363	CD Serverense	2	76	61	16	13	47	69	142
1364	CD Los Yébenes San Bruno	2	80	61	14	19	47	69	153
1365	Club Atlético Cercedilla	2	76	61	14	19	43	65	153
1366	SD Ilintxa	2	76	60	21	18	37	80	111
1367	EMD Santillana	2	76	60	13	21	42	73	138
1368	SD O Val	2	76	60	13	21	42	61	139
1369	CD Iliturgi	2	78	59	14	17	47	66	131
1370	Club Betanzos	5	112	59	20	20	72	127	327
1371	Palencia CF Promesas	3	90	58	23	12	55	90	178
1372	Racing Rioja CF	1	26	57	17	6	3	59	23
1373	UC Cartes	2	54	57	15	12	27	54	86
1374	Deportivo de La Coruña	1	38	56	24	8	6	69	25
1375	CD Mediodía	3	64	56	22	13	29	118	125
1376	Comillas CF	2	58	56	14	14	30	69	111
1377	AD Maravillas	2	76	56	18	20	38	74	122
1378	CD Juvenil	2	72	56	19	18	35	93	154
1379	CF Mota del Cuervo	2	80	56	18	20	42	85	149
1380	SD Huesca B	1	28	55	16	7	5	42	23
1381	CD Vallobín	2	56	55	14	13	29	43	74
1382	Sporting Celanova CF	2	76	55	21	13	42	74	134
1383	CD La Calzada	2	76	55	16	20	40	81	147
1384	CD Avance Ezcabarte	2	76	55	13	16	47	73	151
1385	UD La Fueva	2	76	55	15	10	51	85	186
1386	CD Victoria de Puerto Santa María	3	90	55	21	13	56	113	233
1387	Atlético Ciudad Real	1	38	54	22	10	6	65	21
1388	Mengíbar CF	1	40	54	16	6	18	65	49
1389	UP Santa Catalina	3	82	54	21	12	49	103	170
1390	CD Padura	3	82	54	19	16	47	88	163
1391	Club Condal de Noreña	3	90	54	20	14	56	136	259
1392	Atlético Porcuna CF	2	57	53	11	20	26	55	79
1393	CD Elorrio	2	76	53	19	15	42	82	136
1394	Melilla CD	2	57	53	13	14	30	49	107
1395	CD Juventud Silense	2	78	53	17	19	42	61	160
1396	CD Sagunto	2	68	52	19	14	35	122	150
1397	Gelsa CF	2	76	52	18	16	42	89	137
1398	CD Son Roca	2	76	52	18	16	42	67	141
1399	UD Sevillana	2	66	51	22	7	37	109	182
1400	Betis CF Cavidel	2	74	51	13	16	45	70	145
1401	SD Retuerto Sport	2	76	51	10	21	45	52	136
1402	CF Unión Marina	1	38	50	20	10	8	78	46
1403	Plus Ultra CF	2	78	50	17	10	51	75	161
1404	Bertamiráns FC	2	76	50	11	17	48	60	154
1405	Ciudad de Ibiza CF	1	38	49	12	13	13	54	55
1406	Abanto Club	2	56	49	15	19	22	65	81
1407	Martos Jaén AC	2	66	49	19	13	34	115	154
1408	UD Cádiz	2	66	49	20	9	37	92	148
1409	US San Vicente	2	60	48	18	12	30	91	131
1410	Club Bueu SD	2	60	48	18	12	30	69	110
1411	Racing CF	2	78	48	17	16	45	104	198
1412	CF Son Ferrer	2	76	48	11	15	50	48	166
1413	CD Lumbreras	2	76	48	13	9	54	69	217
1414	Girona FC B	1	26	47	13	8	5	38	18
1415	CD San Pedro Mártir	2	76	47	16	23	37	71	100
1416	SD Izarra de Indauchu	2	60	47	14	19	27	78	108
1417	Riotinto Balompié	2	76	47	15	17	44	74	155
1418	CD Mendi	2	78	47	9	20	49	66	152
1419	EMF Meruelo	2	76	47	11	14	51	64	161
1420	CF Renfe	3	88	47	16	15	57	91	198
1421	PD Garrucha	2	78	47	16	15	47	69	191
1422	Racing Murcia FC	1	26	46	12	10	4	30	12
1423	UD Ibiza-Eivissa B	1	38	46	10	16	12	56	65
1424	UD San Andrés y Sauces	1	38	46	13	7	18	47	65
1425	CP Chinato	2	68	46	10	16	42	58	122
1426	AD Loyola	2	76	46	14	18	44	65	134
1427	UD Tacoronte	2	78	46	17	12	49	77	149
1428	CD Alegría	2	76	46	9	24	43	70	158
1429	PE Sant Jordi	1	26	45	13	6	7	36	31
1430	AD Complutense	1	32	45	12	9	11	28	32
1431	Torrejón CF	1	40	45	11	12	17	47	64
1432	CD Thader	1	40	45	12	9	19	37	54
1433	Gimnástico CF Alcázar	2	54	45	18	9	27	102	150
1434	CD Yuncos	2	76	45	14	14	48	66	150
1435	Estación Atlético	2	78	45	15	15	48	63	152
1436	CD Júpiter Atlético	2	72	45	17	11	44	99	194
1437	CD Recreativo La Victoria	2	76	45	12	17	47	62	160
1438	ADC Abetxuko	2	76	45	13	19	44	55	157
1439	CD Alesves	2	72	45	13	12	47	75	187
1440	CD Lieres	3	90	45	19	7	64	116	246
1441	Getafe CF	1	38	44	17	10	11	63	45
1442	Fundación Tornado CF	1	38	44	12	8	18	40	64
1443	Eume Deportivo CF	2	76	44	13	18	45	65	140
1444	Saguntino CF	3	72	44	16	12	44	92	193
1445	CD Huércal	2	76	44	10	14	52	62	179
1446	CD Santiago de Carbayín	3	92	44	14	16	62	99	292
1447	CD Maganova Juve	1	38	43	16	11	11	48	44
1448	CD Nacional de Madrid	5	41	43	18	7	16	79	88
1449	SDC Galicia Mugardos	1	38	43	10	13	15	48	63
1450	CD Tardajos	2	74	43	10	18	46	60	143
1451	UE La Jonquera	1	38	42	10	12	16	19	29
1452	Castro del Río CF	1	38	41	18	5	15	59	61
1453	SD Salleko Lagunak	1	38	41	12	5	21	40	67
1454	CD Ariznabarra	2	58	41	9	14	35	44	108
1455	Motril CF (1950–1957)	2	40	40	19	2	19	80	89
1456	Mesón do Bento CF	1	36	40	7	19	10	36	48
1457	Daimiel Racing Club	1	38	40	11	7	20	39	67
1458	CD Tánagra	3	64	40	15	10	39	109	158
1459	CD Pontellas	2	61	40	8	16	37	48	112
1460	FC Rinconeda de Polanco	2	68	40	8	16	44	62	149
1461	UD Hospitalet	1	42	39	16	7	19	77	89
1462	CD Canillas	1	38	39	9	12	17	34	52
1463	CD Diocesanos	1	32	39	12	3	17	31	50
1464	CD Boecillo	1	38	39	10	9	19	43	69
1465	CD Laciana	2	60	39	15	9	36	88	154
1466	CE Montaura	1	38	38	9	11	18	46	63
1467	UD Atalaya	1	44	38	12	14	18	63	82
1468	Plasencia CF	3	54	38	15	8	31	100	158
1469	CD Metalúrgica Extremeña	3	60	38	15	8	37	84	153
1470	CD Santañy	3	66	38	17	7	42	102	175
1471	UD Castellonense	2	68	38	15	8	45	87	171
1472	CF Minerva de Hinojedo	1	38	37	10	7	21	42	64
1473	UD Balos	1	38	37	9	10	19	38	62
1474	CD Castro de Rei	1	38	37	10	7	21	47	72
1475	SC Independiente	1	38	37	8	13	17	32	70
1476	SC Malpica	1	38	36	9	9	20	62	79
1477	CF Agrupación Estudiantil	1	34	36	9	9	16	45	66
1478	Zestoa KB	1	38	36	10	6	22	33	59
1479	Olímpica Victoriana CF	2	60	36	11	14	35	56	139
1480	Salvatierra SD	2	76	36	7	15	54	49	172
1481	CD Olmedo	2	76	36	10	18	48	65	213
1482	FC Bidezarra	1	30	35	10	5	15	36	37
1483	Andalucía CF	1	38	35	9	8	21	31	56
1484	Constantina CF	2	40	35	15	5	20	71	102
1485	CD Toranzo Sport	1	38	35	10	5	23	36	73
1486	CF Pomar	1	38	35	10	5	23	34	72
1487	CD Estadilla	2	76	35	10	17	49	53	163
1488	CF Épila AD	2	68	35	9	12	47	68	198
1489	CD La Albuera	2	76	35	12	11	53	56	189
1490	CD Real de Melilla	2	78	35	11	13	54	62	198
1491	CD Velilla Río Carrión	1	42	34	10	14	18	46	62
1492	Ubrique Industrial CF	1	42	34	12	10	20	35	55
1493	Peñarroya CF	1	38	34	8	10	20	35	60
1494	CD Quintanar de la Orden	1	38	34	10	4	24	35	67
1495	La Madalena de Morcín CF	1	38	34	8	10	20	37	70
1496	CD Chozas de Canales	1	38	34	9	7	22	31	66
1497	Cerámica La Rambla CF	1	38	34	8	10	20	38	74
1498	CD Valladares	1	38	33	13	7	18	46	48
1499	CD Huracán de Balazote	1	26	33	9	6	11	31	37
1500	Torrent CF	1	28	33	7	12	9	29	35
1501	SD Montañanesa	2	36	33	15	3	18	57	65
1502	Levante FC	5	40	33	12	9	19	73	88
1503	Yepes CF	1	42	33	11	11	20	44	62
1504	SD Grixoa	1	38	33	7	12	19	32	55
1505	CD Tablero	1	38	33	9	6	23	34	63
1506	CD Molins de Rey	1	42	33	12	9	21	81	111
1507	CD Maella	1	38	33	7	12	19	31	67
1508	CD Betoño Elgorriaga	1	38	32	7	11	20	36	56
1509	CDE Lugo Fuenlabrada	1	38	32	7	11	20	31	57
1510	CD Griñón	1	38	32	7	11	20	33	72
1511	CD Humanes	1	40	32	8	8	24	42	86
1512	SD Villa Nador	2	34	31	12	7	15	53	63
1513	CD Juventud Sallista	2	36	31	12	7	17	53	65
1514	CD Peñaranda de Bracamonte	1	32	31	8	7	17	29	48
1515	Mazarrón CF (1969–1994)	1	38	31	10	11	17	41	63
1516	UD Atléticoos	1	34	31	7	10	17	29	53
1517	CF Campanario	1	30	31	9	4	17	24	49
1518	CD Marconi	1	34	31	12	7	15	52	78
1519	CD Garés	1	38	31	7	10	21	28	54
1520	FC Cruceiro do Hío	1	38	31	6	13	19	47	75
1521	CD Cataluña de Las Corts	1	42	31	11	9	22	73	103
1522	CD Comarca del Mármol	1	38	31	7	10	21	30	62
1523	EF Emérita Augusta	1	38	31	8	7	23	44	77
1524	AD San José Obrero	1	38	31	7	10	21	37	70
1525	Atlético Murcia	1	38	30	7	16	15	45	54
1526	UE Valls	1	30	30	7	9	14	22	34
1527	CD Estepona FS	1	28	30	8	6	14	27	40
1528	Trujillo CF	2	36	30	11	10	15	41	64
1529	Atlético Melilla CF	1	38	30	7	9	22	29	58
1530	CD Oliana	1	38	30	11	8	19	46	80
1531	Imperátor OAR CF	1	40	30	7	9	24	39	83
1532	CD Quinto	1	38	30	7	9	22	23	67
1533	CD Pozo Estrecho	1	38	30	8	6	24	40	88
1534	CP Montehermoso	1	38	30	8	6	24	31	79
1535	CD Fontellas	2	57	30	8	6	43	38	139
1536	UD Bejarana	3	54	30	12	6	36	88	206
1537	CD Vasconia	2	36	29	13	3	20	68	79
1538	CD Garellano	1	34	29	11	7	16	57	72
1539	AD Son Sardina	1	38	29	6	17	15	29	44
1540	CD Hellín	1	38	29	9	11	18	41	66
1541	UD Teruel	3	44	29	13	5	26	67	114
1542	UD Valle Frontera	1	40	29	7	8	25	29	85
1543	CAA Salesianos Salamanca	2	52	29	11	7	34	56	130
1544	CD Benicarló	1	28	28	5	13	10	25	28
1545	Avilés Stadium CF	1	28	28	7	7	14	23	38
1546	Juventud Real Santander SD	1	34	28	10	8	16	57	76
1547	CD Bala Azul (1948–1994)	1	38	28	9	10	19	33	60
1548	Lada Langreo CF	1	38	28	8	12	18	31	58
1549	Burgos UD	1	38	28	7	7	24	23	62
1550	UD Dos Hermanas San Andrés	1	38	28	7	7	24	48	88
1551	CD Morell	1	38	28	7	7	24	29	70
1552	CD Pastas Gallo	2	58	28	9	10	39	49	141
1553	Calavera CF	2	58	28	10	8	40	72	186
1554	CD Egabrense (1924–1947)	1	28	27	11	5	12	69	61
1555	Unión Tangerina CF	2	34	27	10	7	17	47	59
1556	Sporting San Juan	1	30	27	10	7	13	50	64
1557	Móstoles CF	1	32	27	7	6	19	23	45
1558	AD Ceuta B	1	38	27	6	9	23	42	70
1559	Unión Chile CF	1	38	27	9	9	20	45	76
1560	CF Norteño	1	38	27	7	6	25	24	56
1561	AD Penya Arrabal	1	38	27	8	3	27	45	78
1562	Sporting Pontenova	1	38	27	6	9	23	43	82
1563	CD Puertollano B	1	38	27	7	6	25	38	78
1564	CA Consuegra	1	38	27	6	9	23	33	90
1565	EF San Ginés	1	38	27	6	9	23	24	82
1566	UB Lebrijana (1928–1960)	1	30	26	10	6	14	42	60
1567	AD Carmona	1	30	26	10	6	14	39	70
1568	SD Covaleda	1	38	26	6	14	18	33	72
1569	CD Santa Eulalia	1	42	26	11	4	27	63	107
1570	CF Olesa de Montserrat	1	38	26	5	11	22	30	75
1571	UD Carrión de Calatrava	1	38	26	6	8	24	37	90
1572	CD Berga	1	30	25	9	7	14	52	75
1573	AD Lobón	1	30	25	5	10	15	20	48
1574	CF Hércules de Ceuta	1	38	25	9	7	22	52	82
1575	CF Atlético Deportivo Denia	1	38	25	5	10	23	35	72
1576	Ampuero FC	1	38	25	7	4	27	34	79
1577	CF Imperial Murcia	1	38	25	5	10	23	26	79
1578	Arcos CF (1956–1960)	2	48	25	10	8	30	56	121
1579	Picasent CF	1	38	24	8	8	22	39	73
1580	UD Malvarrosa	2	36	24	11	2	23	56	92
1581	Villa del Río CF	1	38	24	8	8	22	38	76
1582	UD Cruz Santa	1	38	24	4	12	22	23	61
1583	Rayo Sanluqueño CD	1	38	24	5	9	24	36	83
1584	EF Esperanza	1	36	24	7	3	26	20	85
1585	CD Bañuelos	2	76	24	5	9	62	57	230
1586	AD Ribadedeva	1	38	23	5	13	20	25	46
1587	CD Alcázar	2	34	23	11	5	18	38	71
1588	CD Dolores de Pacheco	1	36	23	6	11	19	31	68
1589	Cánicas AC	1	38	23	8	7	23	33	73
1590	UD Manises	1	34	23	9	5	20	44	90
1591	SD Huesca B (1950–1989)	1	38	23	7	9	22	37	87
1592	CD Cobeja	1	38	23	5	8	25	34	84
1593	CF Melilla Industrial	1	38	23	8	7	23	33	83
1594	CA España de Cueto	1	38	23	4	11	23	20	74
1595	CD Villa de Simancas	1	38	23	5	8	25	38	93
1596	CD Toluca	1	38	23	9	5	24	32	89
1597	UD Azuaga	2	36	23	10	3	23	47	114
1598	Herencia CF	2	76	23	5	13	58	54	231
1599	Unión SC	2	16	22	11	0	5	53	24
1600	CD Alas Valladolid	1	18	22	9	4	5	41	29
1601	CF Ripoll	1	30	22	10	2	18	60	82
1602	Zumaiako FT	1	38	22	5	12	21	33	55
1603	Alboraya UD	1	34	22	5	12	17	22	45
1604	CD Miguel del Prado	1	30	22	10	2	18	50	77
1605	Munera CF	1	38	22	5	7	26	28	73
1606	CD Ibiza Atlético	1	38	22	8	6	24	35	85
1607	UD San José	1	38	22	6	4	28	37	93
1608	CD Miramar	1	38	22	9	4	25	31	89
1609	CD San Miguel	1	38	22	7	1	30	34	96
1610	CD Almoradí (1943–1948)	1	26	21	10	1	15	47	71
1611	SDR San Lázaro	1	38	21	4	9	25	31	65
1612	AD El Pardo	1	38	21	6	9	23	45	80
1613	Baeza Deportivo	1	30	21	8	5	17	28	68
1614	AD Sangonera La Seca	1	38	21	7	7	24	35	76
1615	SD Dubra	1	38	21	4	9	25	36	83
1616	CD Medellín	1	38	21	6	9	23	25	72
1617	CD Pescadores	2	34	21	8	5	21	43	91
1618	CD Els Ibarsos	1	34	21	7	7	20	31	80
1619	CD Pobla Llarga	1	38	21	4	9	25	29	80
1620	CD Quintana	1	38	21	8	5	25	34	92
1621	Chiclana CF (1948–1957)	2	40	21	8	5	27	50	115
1622	UD Altea	1	42	21	5	6	31	29	108
1623	RC Celta de Vigo	1	14	20	8	4	2	46	18
1624	Club Recreativo Arnao	1	30	20	8	4	18	38	62
1625	Real Granada CF	1	38	20	6	8	24	26	64
1626	CA Castejón	1	34	20	5	10	19	43	87
1627	CP Valencia de Alcántara	1	38	20	3	11	24	24	83
1628	RD Belchite	2	58	20	4	12	42	51	172
1629	CD Ortuella	1	38	19	5	9	24	25	66
1630	CP San Cosme	1	30	19	4	7	19	18	62
1631	Haría CF	1	40	19	4	7	29	29	83
1632	RCD Gara	1	38	19	7	5	26	28	91
1633	CD San Lorenzo de Ezcaray	1	38	19	5	4	29	29	99
1634	SD Los Barrios	1	38	19	9	4	25	58	134
1635	CD Patria Aragón	2	18	18	9	0	9	44	41
1636	CA Velilla	1	38	17	3	11	24	32	75
1637	UE Petra	1	38	17	3	8	27	21	73
1638	UD San Claudio	1	38	17	3	8	27	23	81
1639	Real Salamanca Monterrey CF	1	38	17	6	5	27	38	103
1640	Carbayedo CF	1	30	16	5	6	19	32	60
1641	UD Tarifa	1	30	16	6	4	20	26	67
1642	UD Carlet	1	34	16	6	4	24	37	100
1643	CD Ilumberri	1	40	16	2	10	28	32	100
1644	SC Lutxana	1	38	16	5	6	27	30	100
1645	SD Bruno Villarreal	1	38	16	3	7	28	23	97
1646	Valvanera CD	1	30	15	3	6	21	23	58
1647	UD Cañamera	1	30	15	5	5	20	25	77
1648	CDE EF Zona 5	1	38	15	2	9	27	34	97
1649	CF Luceni	1	38	15	2	11	25	21	92
1650	Club Racing Ceuta	1	38	15	5	5	28	28	123
1651	CD Gimnástico Melilla	1	40	15	4	3	33	22	121
1652	Recreativo de Huelva (1889–1942)	2	10	14	6	2	2	28	15
1653	CF Nules	1	14	14	6	2	6	31	27
1654	Atlético Villacarlos	1	38	14	1	11	26	28	86
1655	Melilla FC	1	38	14	4	6	28	30	97
1656	Jumilla CD	1	38	14	3	5	30	31	111
1657	Zaragoza CD	1	14	13	6	1	7	26	46
1658	CD Segorbe	1	40	13	2	7	31	22	94
1659	Club Arévalo e Hijos Deportivo	1	42	13	3	7	32	36	112
1660	Lorca SC	1	10	12	6	0	4	20	15
1661	CD Celta Zaragoza	1	18	12	4	4	10	23	41
1662	Hércules de Cádiz CF	1	18	12	4	4	10	20	45
1663	Hispania FJ	1	30	12	3	6	21	27	64
1664	Somió CF	1	30	12	4	4	22	42	81
1665	CD San Justo	1	38	12	3	6	29	29	92
1666	Recreativo Linense CF	1	38	12	2	6	30	27	108
1667	CDE Melistar	1	42	12	3	3	36	24	132
1668	CD Minerva Ciudadela	2	18	11	5	1	12	34	39
1669	Cultural y Deportiva Leonesa (1923–1932)	1	14	11	3	5	6	25	33
1670	UD Biescas	1	38	11	2	7	29	19	87
1671	Urgatzi KK	1	30	11	3	2	25	16	91
1672	Racing Club Madrid	1	14	10	3	4	7	23	35
1673	Athletic Saguntino FC	2	12	10	4	2	6	17	34
1674	CA Aurora Pamplona	3	25	10	4	2	19	33	79
1675	AR Chamberí	1	26	10	4	2	20	25	82
1676	Club Arenal de Santiago	1	30	10	4	2	24	41	99
1677	CD Huesca	2	10	9	4	1	5	13	26
1678	CD Onteniente	1	14	9	3	3	8	17	35
1679	CD Cuéllar Balompié	1	38	9	1	6	31	20	87
1680	CD Montijo	2	36	9	4	3	29	47	132
1681	CD Peña Ciudad de Melilla	1	40	9	3	3	34	13	122
1682	CD Basto	1	38	9	2	3	33	18	159
1683	UD San Esteban de Pravia	1	30	8	4	2	24	30	75
1684	CD Castellón (1922–1934)	1	6	7	3	1	2	14	10
1685	Atlético Almería	1	6	7	3	1	2	13	16
1686	Gimnástica de Torrelavega (1907–1930)	1	8	7	2	3	3	14	19
1687	Torrente CF (1922–1944)	1	14	7	2	3	9	21	38
1688	CD Villacañas (1960–1969)	1	34	7	3	4	27	15	127
1689	Club Vigués	1	6	6	2	2	2	13	11
1690	CD Discóbolo Zaragoza	1	6	6	3	0	3	10	9
1691	Lucena CF (I)	1	18	6	3	2	13	21	47
1692	CD Alcazaba	1	18	6	2	2	14	18	53
1693	CD Alcudia de Carlet	1	30	6	1	4	25	25	99
1694	CF Rusadir	1	38	6	2	3	33	20	132
1695	Galicia SC Orense	1	4	5	2	1	1	7	13
1696	CD Borja	1	18	5	1	3	14	21	78
1697	Lorca CF (1943–1950)	1	18	5	1	3	14	9	74
1698	Atlético Delicias CF	1	30	5	0	5	25	20	111
1699	Xerez CF	1	4	4	2	0	2	7	8
1700	Castilla FC de Madrid	1	6	4	2	0	4	10	22
1701	CD Español Arrabal	1	8	4	1	2	5	10	23
1702	CP Parla Escuela	1	38	4	0	4	34	16	93
1703	Club Coruña	1	4	3	1	1	2	3	11
1704	CD Esperanza San Sebastián	1	3	2	1	0	2	5	13
1705	Club Alkartasuna	1	4	2	1	0	3	7	16
1706	AD Tranviaria Madrid	1	6	2	1	0	5	0	12
1707	Málaga SC	2	8	2	0	2	6	8	23
1708	CD Rochapeano	1	6	2	1	0	5	6	37
1709	GE Renault	1	30	2	0	2	28	28	124
1710	Club Ciosvín Vigo	1	4	1	0	1	3	3	22
1711	Cartagena Atlético	1	19	0	8	3	8	23	24
1712	Unión Sporting Madrid	1	4	0	0	0	4	0	16

== Copa del Rey ==
Records in this section refers to Copa del Rey from its founding in 1902 through to the present.

- Most wins: 32, Barcelona (1910, 1912, 1913, 1920, 1922, 1925, 1926, 1928, 1942, 1951, 1952, 1953, 1957, 1959, 1963, 1968, 1971, 1978, 1981, 1983, 1988, 1990, 1997, 1998, 2009, 2012, 2015, 2016, 2017, 2018, 2021, 2025)
- Most consecutive wins: 4, joint record:
  - Barcelona (2015, 2016, 2017, 2018)
  - Athletic Bilbao (1930, 1931, 1932, 1933)
  - Real Madrid (1905, 1906, 1907, 1908)
- Most consecutive finals played: 6, Barcelona (2014, 2015, 2016, 2017, 2018, 2019)
- Most finals played: 43, Barcelona (1910, 1912, 1913, 1919, 1920, 1922, 1925, 1926, 1928, 1932, 1936, 1942, 1951, 1952, 1953, 1954, 1957, 1959, 1963, 1968, 1971, 1974, 1978, 1981, 1983, 1984, 1986, 1988, 1990, 1996, 1997, 1998, 2009, 2011, 2012, 2014, 2015, 2016, 2017, 2018, 2019, 2021, 2025)
- Most finals without winning: 4, Celta Vigo (1908, 1948, 1994, 2001)
- Most finals without losing: 2, Deportivo La Coruña (1995, 2002)
- Biggest win in a final: joint record
  - Barcelona 5–0 Sevilla (2018)
  - Athletic Bilbao 5–0 Espanyol (1915)
  - Real Madrid 6–1 Castilla (1980)
- Most goals in a final: 8, Sevilla 6–2 Racing de Ferrol (1939)
- Most goals by a losing side: 3, joint record:
  - Athletic Bilbao losing 3–4 against Barcelona 1942
  - Valencia losing 3–4 against Barcelona 1971
- Most consecutive rounds won: 24, Barcelona (16 December 2014 – 27 February 2019)
- Biggest home win: Real Murcia 14–0 Cieza Promesas (first round, 10 September 1991–92 Copa del Rey)
- Biggest away win: Don Benito 0–13 Celta Vigo (first round, 10 April 1932 Copa del Rey). Celta Vigo was considered as a guest even though the game was played at Celta Vigo Balaídos stadium. Aside from this anomality, the biggest away win was Tardienta 0–12 Getafe (first round, 1 November 2023–24 Copa del Rey), at El Alcoraz, with a result of 0–12.
- Biggest winning scoreline: Celta Vigo 22–0 Don Benito (first round 1932 Copa del Rey)
- Longest penalty shoot-out: 28 (14 rounds), joint record:
  - Real Ávila 12–13 Real Burgos (29 September 1986–87 Copa del Rey)
  - Córdoba 12–13 Deportivo La Coruña (11 September 2013–14 Copa del Rey)

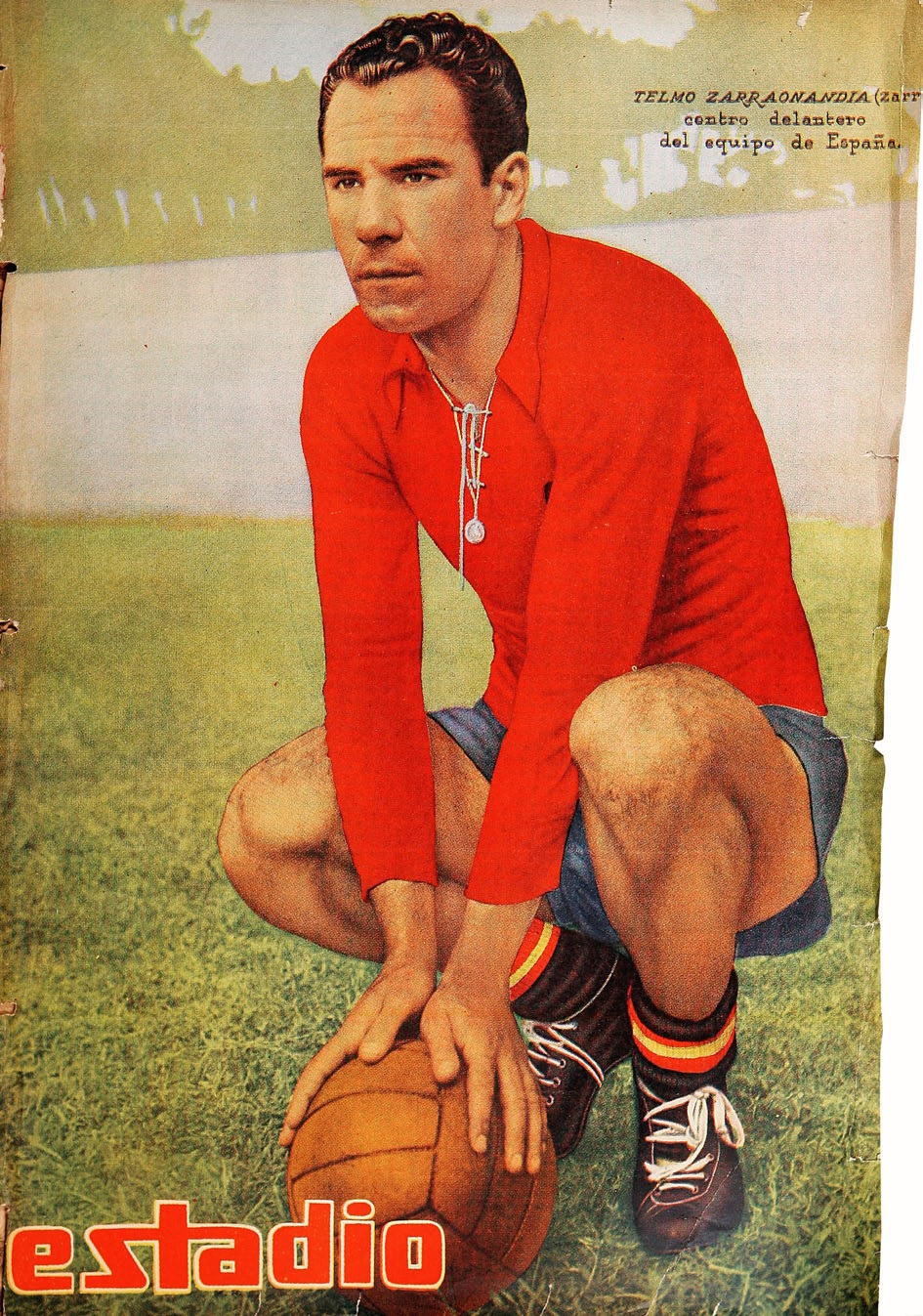
Telmo Zarra is the all-time top goalscorer in Copa del Rey history with 81 goals.

=== Top 10 goalscorers, all-time ===
Players in bold are still active.

Rank	Player	Nat.	Pos.	Years	Club(s)	Total	Ref.
1	Telmo Zarra	(Spain)	FW	1939–1957	Athletic Bilbao (81)	81	
2	Josep Samitier	(Spain)	MF	1919–1934	Barcelona (65), Real Madrid (5)	70	
3	Guillermo Gorostiza	(Spain)	FW	1928–1948	Racing Ferrol (3), Athletic Bilbao (37), Valencia (24), Logroñés (1)	65	
4	**Lionel Messi**	(Argentina)	FW	2005–2021	Barcelona (56)	56	
5	Ramón Polo	(Spain)	FW	1920–1935	Real Fortuna (2), Celta Vigo (52)	54	
6	Edmundo Suárez	(Spain)	FW	1939–1950	Valencia (52)	52	
7	Quini	(Spain)	FW	1968–1987	Sporting Gijón (36), Barcelona (14)	50	
8	Ferenc Puskás	(Hungary) (Spain)	FW	1958–1962	Real Madrid (49)	49	
8	László Kubala	(Hungary) (Spain)	FW	1951–1965	Barcelona (49)	49	
8	Santillana	(Spain)	FW	1970–1988	Real Madrid (49)	49	

=== Individual ===
- Most wins: 7
  - Agustín Gaínza (Athletic Bilbao) (1943, 1944, 1945, 1950, 1955, 1956, 1958)
  - Lionel Messi (Barcelona) (2009, 2012, 2015, 2016, 2017, 2018, 2021)
  - Sergio Busquets (Barcelona) (2009, 2012, 2015, 2016, 2017, 2018, 2021)
  - Gerard Piqué (Barcelona) (2009, 2012, 2015, 2016, 2017, 2018, 2021)
- Most appearances: 108, Andoni Zubizarreta (Athletic Bilbao, Barcelona and Valencia)
- Most appearances at one club: 99, Agustín Gaínza (Athletic Bilbao)
- Most appearances in a final: 10
  - Lionel Messi (Barcelona) (2009, 2011, 2012, 2014, 2015, 2016, 2017, 2018, 2019, 2021)
  - Sergio Busquets (Barcelona) (2009, 2011, 2012, 2014, 2015, 2016, 2017, 2018, 2019, 2021)
- Most goals scored: 81, Telmo Zarra (Athletic Bilbao)
- Most goals scored in one game: 8, Agustín Gaínza (Athletic Bilbao) 12–1 against Celta Vigo 18 May 1947
- Most goals scored in one season: 21, Josep Samitier (Barcelona) 1928
- Most goals scored in a final: 4, Telmo Zarra (Athletic Bilbao) 1950
- Most goals scored in finals: 9, Lionel Messi (Barcelona)
- Most finals scored in: 7, Lionel Messi (2009, 2012, 2015, 2017, 2018, 2019, 2021)
- Most consecutive finals scored in: 4, Telmo Zarra (Athletic Bilbao) (1942, 1943, 1944, 1945)
- Most assists provided in finals: 6, Lionel Messi (1 in 2009, 2 in 2016, 1 in 2017, 2 in 2018)

== See also ==
- Copa del Rey
- La Liga
- La Liga records and statistics
- List of Copa del Rey finals
- List of Spanish football champions
- Supercopa de España
