= Miguel Ledo =

Spanish footballer (1990–2024)

Personal information
- Full name: Miguel Ledo Elvira
- Date of birth: 26 October 1990
- Place of birth: Logroño, Spain
- Date of death: 4 November 2024 (aged 34)
- Height: 1.90 m (6 ft 3 in)
- Position: Centre-back

Youth career
- Berceo
- Peña Balsamaiso

Senior career*
Years	Team	Apps	(Gls)
2009–2022	Logroñés	312+	(38)
- * Club domestic league appearances and goals

Miguel Ledo Elvira (26 October 1990 – 4 November 2024) was a Spanish footballer who played as a centre-back. He spent most of his career from 2009 to 2022 with SD Logroñés.

== Career ==
Born in Logroño in La Rioja, Ledo played as a youth for Peña Balsamaiso CF and CD Berceo. In April 2009, he signed for a club to be set up by fans of the recently defunct CD Logroñés; this club was launched two months later as SD Logroñés. He started in the club's first game, a 4–0 loss to CD Arnedo on 1 August.

Captain since 2014, Ledo was dubbed "The Play-Off King" by local newspaper La Rioja in May 2019 for having played all seven play-off campaigns of the ten-year-old club.

Ledo combined his football career with study and other work, including as a teacher and a school dining hall monitor. He had to give this up for his final season in 2021–22, as the club switched to training in the morning. In the same season, he played only 80 minutes in total up to February, though he scored twice. This included a late equaliser away to Deportivo de La Coruña in a 1–1 draw on 1 October.

In June 2022, SD Logroñés announced that Ledo was leaving the club. His 13 seasons had been spent in the Preferente Regional (1), Tercera División (8), Segunda División B (3) and Primera Federación (1). He made 290 appearances in total.

== Personal life and death ==
Though his surname was native to Galicia, Ledo told La Voz de Galicia that he had no known link to the northwestern region.

In November 2023, while a player for Haro Deportivo of the Tercera Federación, Ledo made public that he had leukaemia. He recovered but his condition returned, and he died on 4 November 2024, at the age of 34.
