= CD Cenicero =

Spanish football team

Cenicero
- Full name: Club Deportivo Cenicero
- Founded: 1984
- Ground: Las Viñas, Cenicero, La Rioja, Spain
- Capacity: 1,200
- Chairman: (Spain) Ludovico Mozo
- Manager: (Spain) José Luis Marcos
- League: Tercera Federación – Group 16
- 2025–26: Regional Preferente, 4th of 18 (promoted)
Home colours	Away colours

Club Deportivo Cenicero is a Spanish football team based in Cenicero in the autonomous community of La Rioja. Founded in 1984, it plays in Tercera Federación – Group 16. Its stadium is Campo de Fútbol Las Viñas with a capacity of 1,200 seaters.

== Season to season ==
Season	Tier	Division	Place	Copa del Rey
1984–85	7	2ª Reg.	7th	
1985–86	7	2ª Reg.	3rd	
1986–87	6	1ª Reg.	15th	
1987–88	6	1ª Reg.	6th	
1988–89	6	1ª Reg.	1st	
1989–90	5	Reg. Pref.	13th	
1990–91	5	Reg. Pref.	7th	
1991–92	5	Reg. Pref.	4th	
1992–93	5	Reg. Pref.	3rd	
1993–94	5	Reg. Pref.	4th	
1994–95	5	Reg. Pref.	7th	
1995–96	5	Reg. Pref.	4th	
1996–97	5	Reg. Pref.	8th	
1997–98	5	Reg. Pref.	4th	
1998–99	5	Reg. Pref.	11th	
1999–2000	5	Reg. Pref.	6th	
2000–01	5	Reg. Pref.	5th	
2001–02	5	Reg. Pref.	8th	
2002–03	5	Reg. Pref.	4th	
2003–04	5	Reg. Pref.	11th	

Season	Tier	Division	Place	Copa del Rey
2004–05	5	Reg. Pref.	6th	
2005–06	5	Reg. Pref.	3rd	
2006–07	4	3ª	13th	
2007–08	4	3ª	15th	
2008–09	4	3ª	17th	
2009–10	4	3ª	17th	
2010–11	4	3ª	19th	
2011–12	5	Reg. Pref.	14th	
2012–13	5	Reg. Pref.	7th	
2013–14	5	Reg. Pref.	9th	
2014–15	5	Reg. Pref.	12th	
2015–16	5	Reg. Pref.	12th	
2016–17	5	Reg. Pref.	12th	
2017–18	5	Reg. Pref.	6th	
2018–19	5	Reg. Pref.	6th	
2019–20	5	Reg. Pref.	12th	
2020–21	5	Reg. Pref.	2nd	
2021–22	5	3ª RFEF	16th	
2022–23	6	Reg. Pref.	3rd	
2023–24	6	Reg. Pref.	1st	

Season	Tier	Division	Place	Copa del Rey
2024–25	6	Reg. Pref.	8th	
2025–26	6	Reg. Pref.	4th	
2026–27	5	3ª Fed.		

- 5 seasons in Tercera División
- 2 seasons in Tercera Federación/Tercera División RFEF
