= CA Vianés =

Association football club in Spain

Atlético Vianés
- Full name: Club Atlético Vianés
- Founded: 1951
- Ground: Estadio Municipal de Viana, Navarre, Spain
- Capacity: 500
- Chairman: Nieves Miranda
- Manager: Borja Lerma
- League: Tercera Federación – Group 16
- 2025–26: Tercera Federación – Group 16, 9th of 18
Home colours	Away colours

Club Atlético Vianés is a Spanish football team located in the town of Viana in Navarre, but plays in autonomous community of La Rioja. Founded in 1951, they currently play in Tercera Federación – Group 16, holding home matches at Estadio Municipal de Viana, with a capacity of 500 spectators.

== History ==
Founded in 1951 under the name of Club Deportivo Vianés, they were the direct heir of the old team called Club Deportivo Amayur, which disappeared in 1950. In 1986, the club changed name to Club Atlético Vianés.

The club moved from the Navarre Football Federation to the Riojan Football Federation in 1986, returning in 1993 but moving again in 1997. Vianés achieved their first-ever promotion to Tercera División in 2008.

== Season to season ==
Season	Tier	Division	Place	Copa del Rey
1956–57	5	2ª Reg.	1st	
1957–58	5	2ª Reg.	5th	
1958–59	DNP			
1959–60	DNP			
1960–61	DNP			
1961–62	5	2ª Reg.	3rd	
1962–63	4	1ª Reg.	12th	
1963–64	4	1ª Reg.	13th	
1964–65	5	2ª Reg.	3rd	
1965–66	DNP			
1966–67	DNP			
1967–68	5	2ª Reg.	7th	
1968–69	5	2ª Reg.	5th	
1969–70	5	2ª Reg.	9th	
1970–71	5	2ª Reg.	9th	
1971–72	5	2ª Reg.	11th	
1972–73	5	2ª Reg.	14th	
1973–74	6	3ª Reg.	8th	
1974–75	DNP			
1975–76	6	2ª Reg.	1st	

Season	Tier	Division	Place	Copa del Rey
1976–77	5	1ª Reg.	11th	
1977–78	6	1ª Reg.	15th	
1978–79	7	2ª Reg.	6th	
1979–80	7	2ª Reg.	7th	
1980–81	DNP			
1981–82	7	2ª Reg.	3rd	
1982–83	6	1ª Reg.	4th	
1983–84	6	1ª Reg.	13th	
1984–85	6	1ª Reg.	9th	
1985–86	6	1ª Reg.	16th	
1986–87	6	1ª Reg.	8th	
1987–88	6	1ª Reg.	1st	
1988–89	5	Reg. Pref.	11th	
1989–90	5	Reg. Pref.	12th	
1990–91	5	Reg. Pref.	16th	
1991–92	5	Reg. Pref.	11th	
1992–93	DNP			
1993–94	6	1ª Reg.	13th	
1994–95	6	1ª Reg.	10th	
1995–96	6	1ª Reg.	10th	

Season	Tier	Division	Place	Copa del Rey
1996–97	6	1ª Reg.	(R)	
1997–98	5	Reg. Pref.	8th	
1998–99	5	Reg. Pref.	10th	
1999–2000	5	Reg. Pref.	7th	
2000–01	5	Reg. Pref.	9th	
2001–02	5	Reg. Pref.	12th	
2002–03	5	Reg. Pref.	11th	
2003–04	5	Reg. Pref.	17th	
2004–05	5	Reg. Pref.	10th	
2005–06	5	Reg. Pref.	8th	
2006–07	5	Reg. Pref.	3rd	
2007–08	4	3ª	18th	
2008–09	5	Reg. Pref.	1st	
2009–10	4	3ª	12th	
2010–11	4	3ª	13th	
2011–12	4	3ª	12th	
2012–13	4	3ª	8th	
2013–14	4	3ª	5th	
2014–15	4	3ª	11th	
2015–16	4	3ª	13th	

Season	Tier	Division	Place	Copa del Rey
2016–17	4	3ª	11th	
2017–18	4	3ª	14th	
2018–19	4	3ª	16th	
2019–20	4	3ª	14th	
2020–21	4	3ª	8th / 2nd	
2021–22	5	3ª RFEF	13th	
2022–23	5	3ª Fed.	8th	
2023–24	5	3ª Fed.	14th	
2024–25	5	3ª Fed.	14th	
2025–26	5	3ª Fed.	9th	
2026–27	5	3ª Fed.		

- 13 seasons in Tercera División
- 6 seasons in Tercera Federación/Tercera División RFEF
