= Henicero =

Henicero may be a misspelling of:

- Cenicero, a municipality in La Rioja, Spain.
- Genízaro, Hispano Native Americans in the southwest United States
