= Teguise =

Teguise may refer to:

- Teguise (municipality), on the island of Lanzarote in the Canary Islands
- Teguise (village), on the island of Lanzarote in the Canary Islands
- CD Teguise, a football team on the island of Lanzarote in the Canary Islands
