= CDFC La Calzada =

Association football club in Spain

La Calzada
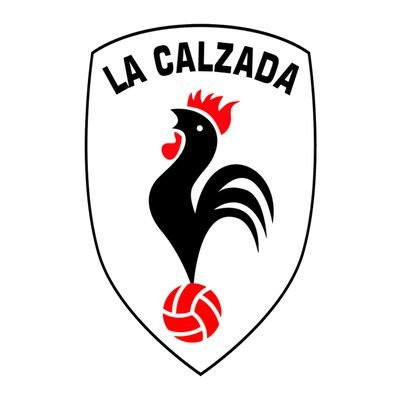
- Full name: Club Deportivo Fundación Cultural La Calzada
- Nickname: Calceatenses
- Founded: 1923
- Ground: El Rollo, La Rioja, Spain
- Capacity: 1,500
- President: Francisco Jimenez Martin
- Head coach: David Blázquez "Gallofa"
- League: Tercera Federación – Group 16
- 2025–26: Tercera Federación – Group 16, 13th of 18
Home colours	Away colours

Club Deportivo Fundación Cultural La Calzada is a Spanish football team located in Santo Domingo de la Calzada, autonomous community of La Rioja. Founded in 1923 it currently plays in Tercera Federación – Group 16, holding home matches at El Rollo with a capacity of 1,500 spectators.

== History ==
The club was founded in 1923 as Club Deportivo La Calzada. After being dissolved in 2005, Club Deportivo Fundación Cultural La Calzada were created in the following year.

== Season to season ==
=== As CD La Calzada ===
Season	Tier	Division	Place	Copa del Rey
1957–58	5	2ª Reg.	3rd	
1958–59	5	2ª Reg.	2nd	
1959–60	4	1ª Reg.	13th	
1960–61	4	1ª Reg.	5th	
1961–62	4	1ª Reg.	4th	
1962–63	4	1ª Reg.	10th	
1963–64	4	1ª Reg.	5th	
1964–65	4	1ª Reg.	4th	
1965–66	4	1ª Reg.	9th	
1966–67	4	1ª Reg.	7th	
1967–68	4	1ª Reg.	10th	
1968–69	4	1ª Reg.	12th	
1969–70	4	1ª Reg.	15th	
1970–71	5	2ª Reg.	1st	
1971–72	4	1ª Reg.	16th	
1972–73	4	1ª Reg.	18th	
1973–74	5	2ª Reg.	1st	
1974–75	4	Reg. Pref.	20th	
1975–76	5	1ª Reg.	6th	
1976–77	5	1ª Reg.	5th	

Season	Tier	Division	Place	Copa del Rey
1977–78	6	1ª Reg.	9th	
1978–79	6	1ª Reg.	2nd	
1979–80	6	1ª Reg.	3rd	
1980–81	6	1ª Reg.	7th	
1981–82	6	1ª Reg.	6th	
1982–83	6	1ª Reg.	15th	
1983–84	6	1ª Reg.	3rd	
1984–85	6	1ª Reg.	5th	
1985–86	6	1ª Reg.	4th	
1986–87	5	Reg. Pref.	11th	
1987–88	5	Reg. Pref.	14th	
1988–89	5	Reg. Pref.	4th	
1989–90	5	Reg. Pref.	4th	
1990–91	5	Reg. Pref.	4th	
1991–92	5	Reg. Pref.	3rd	
1992–93	5	Reg. Pref.	4th	
1993–94	5	Reg. Pref.	1st	
1994–95	4	3ª	10th	
1995–96	4	3ª	20th	
1996–97	5	Reg. Pref.	10th	

Season	Tier	Division	Place	Copa del Rey
1997–98	5	Reg. Pref.	5th	
1998–99	5	Reg. Pref.	12th	
1999–2000	5	Reg. Pref.	3rd	
2000–01	5	Reg. Pref.	8th	
2001–02	5	Reg. Pref.	13th	
2002–03	5	Reg. Pref.	11th	
2003–04	5	Reg. Pref.	18th	
2004–05	5	Reg. Pref.	13th	

=== As CDFC La Calzada ===
Season	Tier	Division	Place	Copa del Rey
2006–07	5	Reg. Pref.	14th	
2007–08	5	Reg. Pref.	13th	
2008–09	5	Reg. Pref.	9th	
2009–10	5	Reg. Pref.	9th	
2010–11	5	Reg. Pref.	7th	
2011–12	5	Reg. Pref.	4th	
2012–13	4	3ª	15th	
2013–14	4	3ª	11th	
2014–15	4	3ª	9th	
2015–16	4	3ª	15th	
2016–17	4	3ª	18th	
2017–18	5	Reg. Pref.	3rd	
2018–19	4	3ª	13th	
2019–20	4	3ª	18th	
2020–21	4	3ª	5th / 6th	
2021–22	5	3ª RFEF	6th	
2022–23	5	3ª Fed.	4th	
2023–24	5	3ª Fed.	8th	
2024–25	5	3ª Fed.	6th	
2025–26	5	3ª Fed.	13th	

Season	Tier	Division	Place	Copa del Rey
2026–27	5	3ª Fed.		

- 10 seasons in Tercera División
- 6 seasons in Tercera Federación/Tercera División RFEF
