= CF Rápid =

Spanish association football club

Rápid de Murillo
- Full name: Club de Fútbol Rápid
- Founded: 1967
- Ground: El Rozo, Murillo de Río Leza, La Rioja, Spain
- Capacity: 2,000
- President: Iván Saénz
- Manager: Héctor Cambra
- League: Regional Preferente
- 2025–26: Regional Preferente – Group 2, 10th of 18
| Home colours | Away colours |

Club de Fútbol Rápid, known mainly as Rápid de Murillo, is a Spanish football club based in Murillo de Río Leza, La Rioja. Founded in 1967, they play in Regional Preferente, holding home games at the Campo Municipal de El Rozo, with a capacity of 2,000 people.

== History ==
The club was founded in 1967 as an honour to Valencia CF, which had just been champions of the 1966–67 Copa del Generalísimo. After only playing in regional leagues and a period of inactivity in the 1970s and 1980s, the club won promotion to Tercera División in 1996.

== Season to season ==
| Season | Tier | Division | Place | Copa del Rey |
|---|---|---|---|---|
| 1969–70 | 5 | 2ª Reg. | 15th | |
| 1970–71 | 6 | 3ª Reg. | 11th | |
| 1971–72 | DNP | | | |
| 1972–73 | DNP | | | |
| 1973–74 | 6 | 3ª Reg. | 3rd | |
| 1974–75 | 6 | 2ª Reg. | 8th | |
| 1975–76 | 6 | 2ª Reg. | 4th | |
| 1976–77 | 6 | 2ª Reg. | 4th | |
| 1977–78 | 7 | 2ª Reg. | 3rd | |
| 1978–79 | 6 | 1ª Reg. | 12th | |
| 1979–80 | 6 | 1ª Reg. | 12th | |
| 1980–81 | 6 | 1ª Reg. | 12th | |
| 1981–82 | 6 | 1ª Reg. | 15th | |
| 1982–83 | 7 | 2ª Reg. | 8th | |
| 1983–84 | 7 | 2ª Reg. | 3rd | |
| 1984–85 | 6 | 1ª Reg. | 16th | |
| 1985–86 | DNP | | | |
| 1986–87 | 6 | 1ª Reg. | 4th | |
| 1987–88 | 6 | 1ª Reg. | 8th | |
| 1988–89 | 6 | 1ª Reg. | 7th | |

| Season | Tier | Division | Place | Copa del Rey |
|---|---|---|---|---|
| 1989–90 | DNP | | | |
| 1990–91 | DNP | | | |
| 1991–92 | 5 | Reg. Pref. | 10th | |
| 1992–93 | 5 | Reg. Pref. | 6th | |
| 1993–94 | 5 | Reg. Pref. | 7th | |
| 1994–95 | 5 | Reg. Pref. | 2nd | |
| 1995–96 | 5 | Reg. Pref. | 2nd | |
| 1996–97 | 4 | 3ª | 21st | |
| 1997–98 | 5 | Reg. Pref. | 1st | |
| 1998–99 | 4 | 3ª | 20th | |
| 1999–2000 | 5 | Reg. Pref. | 1st | |
| 2000–01 | 5 | Reg. Pref. | 6th | |
| 2001–02 | 5 | Reg. Pref. | 6th | |
| 2002–03 | 5 | Reg. Pref. | 8th | |
| 2003–04 | 5 | Reg. Pref. | 13th | |
| 2004–05 | 5 | Reg. Pref. | 2nd | |
| 2005–06 | 4 | 3ª | 14th | |
| 2006–07 | 4 | 3ª | 16th | |
| 2007–08 | 4 | 3ª | 19th | |
| 2008–09 | 5 | Reg. Pref. | 10th | |

| Season | Tier | Division | Place | Copa del Rey |
|---|---|---|---|---|
| 2009–10 | 5 | Reg. Pref. | 16th | |
| 2010–11 | 5 | Reg. Pref. | 5th | |
| 2011–12 | 5 | Reg. Pref. | 5th | |
| 2012–13 | 4 | 3ª | 19th | |
| 2013–14 | 5 | Reg. Pref. | 7th | |
| 2014–15 | 5 | Reg. Pref. | 5th | |
| 2015–16 | 5 | Reg. Pref. | 1st | |
| 2016–17 | 4 | 3ª | 20th | |
| 2017–18 | 5 | Reg. Pref. | 4th | |
| 2018–19 | 4 | 3ª | 18th | |
| 2019–20 | 5 | Reg. Pref. | 7th | |
| 2020–21 | 5 | Reg. Pref. | 3rd | |
| 2021–22 | 5 | 3ª RFEF | 15th | |
| 2022–23 | 6 | Reg. Pref. | 4th | |
| 2023–24 | 6 | Reg. Pref. | 3rd | |
| 2024–25 | 6 | Reg. Pref. | 6th | |
| 2025–26 | 6 | Reg. Pref. | | |

- 8 seasons in Tercera División
- 1 season in Tercera División RFEF
