= CD Aldeano =

Association football club in Spain

Aldeano
- Full name: Club Deportivo Aldeano
- Founded: 1948
- Ground: San Bartolomé; Aldeanueva de Ebro, La Rioja, Spain
- Capacity: 2,000
- Chairman: María del Carmen Roldán Velázquez
- Manager: Víctor Morales
- League: Regional Preferente
- 2025–26: Regional Preferente, 9th of 18
Home colours	Away colours

Club Deportivo Aldeano is a Spanish football team based in Aldeanueva de Ebro, in the autonomous community of La Rioja. Founded in 1948, they play in Regional Preferente, holding home games at Estadio San Bartolomé, with a capacity of 2,000 people.

== History ==
After spending the most of their history in the regional leagues, Aldeano became inactive in 2003, after 13 consecutive years in the Regional Preferente. The club returned to action in 2006 under the name of Aldeano River, and achieved a first-ever promotion to Tercera División three years later, changing to their previous name shortly after.

After suffering relegation in 2011, the club returned to Tercera at first attempt, but was again relegated.

== Season to season ==
Season	Tier	Division	Place	Copa del Rey
1958–59	5	2ª Reg.	1st	
1959–1966	DNP			
1966–67	5	2ª Reg.	(R)	
1967–1972	DNP			
1972–73	6	3ª Reg.	6th	
1973–74	6	3ª Reg.	5th	
1974–75	6	2ª Reg.	10th	
1975–76	6	2ª Reg.	1st	
1976–77	5	1ª Reg.	13th	
1977–78	7	2ª Reg.	3rd	
1978–79	6	1ª Reg.	8th	
1979–80	6	1ª Reg.	2nd	
1980–81	6	1ª Reg.	6th	
1981–82	6	1ª Reg.	7th	
1982–83	6	1ª Reg.	14th	
1983–84	6	1ª Reg.	5th	
1984–85	6	1ª Reg.	1st	
1985–86	5	Reg. Pref.	15th	
1986–87	5	Reg. Pref.	12th	
1987–88	5	Reg. Pref.	13th	

Season	Tier	Division	Place	Copa del Rey
1988–89	5	Reg. Pref.	12th	
1989–90	5	Reg. Pref.	11th	
1990–91	5	Reg. Pref.	18th	
1991–92	5	Reg. Pref.	8th	
1992–93	5	Reg. Pref.	4th	
1993–94	5	Reg. Pref.	9th	
1994–95	5	Reg. Pref.	15th	
1995–96	5	Reg. Pref.	17th	
1996–97	5	Reg. Pref.	18th	
1997–98	5	Reg. Pref.	10th	
1998–99	5	Reg. Pref.	11th	
1999–2000	5	Reg. Pref.	11th	
2000–01	5	Reg. Pref.	13th	
2001–02	5	Reg. Pref.	11th	
2002–03	5	Reg. Pref.	10th	
2003–04	DNP			
2004–05	DNP			
2005–06	DNP			
2006–07	5	Reg. Pref.	13th	
2007–08	5	Reg. Pref.	7th	

Season	Tier	Division	Place	Copa del Rey
2008–09	5	Reg. Pref.	3rd	
2009–10	4	3ª	16th	
2010–11	4	3ª	18th	
2011–12	5	Reg. Pref.	6th	
2012–13	4	3ª	20th	
2013–14	5	Reg. Pref.	11th	
2014–15	5	Reg. Pref.	11th	
2015–16	5	Reg. Pref.	13th	
2016–17	5	Reg. Pref.	10th	
2017–18	5	Reg. Pref.	9th	
2018–19	5	Reg. Pref.	11th	
2019–20	5	Reg. Pref.	16th	
2020–21	5	Reg. Pref.	4th	
2021–22	6	Reg. Pref.	3rd	Preliminary
2022–23	6	Reg. Pref.	4th	
2023–24	6	Reg. Pref.	4th	
2024–25	6	Reg. Pref.	11th	
2025–26	6	Reg. Pref.		

- 3 seasons in Tercera División
