= CCD Alberite =

Association football club in Spain

Alberite
- Full name: Club Cultural y Deportivo Alberite
- Founded: 1967
- Ground: Marino Sáenz, Alberite, La Rioja, Spain
- Capacity: 2,000
- Chairman: Andrés Baños
- Manager: Joaquin Heras Terreras "Quino"
- League: Regional Preferente
- 2025–26: Regional Preferente, 11th of 18
Home colours	Away colours

Club Cultural y Deportivo Alberite is a Spanish football team based in Alberite in the autonomous community of La Rioja. Founded in 1967, it plays in Regional Preferente. Its stadium is Estadio Marino Sáenz with a capacity of 2,000 seaters.

== Season to season ==
Season	Tier	Division	Place	Copa del Rey
1969–70	5	2ª Reg.	8th	
1970–71	5	2ª Reg.	7th	
1971–72	5	2ª Reg.	12th	
1972–73	5	2ª Reg.	13th	
1973–74	5	2ª Reg.	11th	
1974–75	5	1ª Reg.	8th	
1975–76	5	1ª Reg.	16th	
1976–77	6	2ª Reg.	13th	
1977–78	7	2ª Reg.	5th	
1978–79	7	2ª Reg.	3rd	
1979–80	6	1ª Reg.	7th	
1980–81	6	1ª Reg.	3rd	
1981–82	6	1ª Reg.	14th	
1982–83	7	2ª Reg.	2nd	
1983–84	6	1ª Reg.	8th	
1984–85	6	1ª Reg.	1st	
1985–86	5	Reg. Pref.	20th	
1986–87	5	Reg. Pref.	5th	
1987–88	5	Reg. Pref.	1st	
1988–89	4	3ª	19th	

Season	Tier	Division	Place	Copa del Rey
1989–90	5	Reg. Pref.	2nd	
1990–91	5	Reg. Pref.	6th	
1991–92	5	Reg. Pref.	1st	
1992–93	5	Reg. Pref.	8th	
1993–94	5	Reg. Pref.	3rd	
1994–95	5	Reg. Pref.	11th	
1995–96	5	Reg. Pref.	19th	
1996–97	5	Reg. Pref.	7th	
1997–98	5	Reg. Pref.	4th	
1998–99	5	Reg. Pref.	1st	
1999–2000	5	Reg. Pref.	4th	
2000–01	4	3ª	20th	
2001–02	5	Reg. Pref.	4th	
2002–03	4	3ª	13th	
2003–04	4	3ª	21st	
2004–05	5	Reg. Pref.	1st	
2005–06	4	3ª	17th	
2006–07	5	Reg. Pref.	2nd	
2007–08	4	3ª	14th	
2008–09	4	3ª	16th	

Season	Tier	Division	Place	Copa del Rey
2009–10	4	3ª	20th	
2010–11	5	Reg. Pref.	6th	
2011–12	5	Reg. Pref.	11th	
2012–13	5	Reg. Pref.	1st	
2013–14	4	3ª	20th	
2014–15	5	Reg. Pref.	3rd	
2015–16	4	3ª	20th	
2016–17	5	Reg. Pref.	4th	
2017–18	5	Reg. Pref.	2nd	
2018–19	4	3ª	15th	
2019–20	4	3ª	15th	
2020–21	4	3ª	11th / 9th	
2021–22	6	Reg. Pref.	1st	
2022–23	6	Reg. Pref.	1st	
2023–24	5	3ª Fed.	18th	
2024–25	6	Reg. Pref.	5th	
2025–26	6	Reg. Pref.		

- 13 seasons in Tercera División
- 1 season in Tercera Federación
