= CP Calasancio =

Association football club in Spain

Calasancio
- Full name: Club Polideportivo Calasancio
- Founded: 1977
- Ground: La Estrella, Logroño, La Rioja, Spain
- Capacity: 500
- Chairman: (Spain) Miguel Ángel Villaro Palacios
- Manager: (Spain) Ricardo Huerta
- League: Tercera Federación – Group 16
- 2025–26: Regional Preferente, 1st of 18 (champions)
Home colours	Away colours

Club Polideportivo Calasancio is a Spanish football team based in Logroño in the autonomous community of La Rioja. Founded in 1977, it plays in Tercera Federación – Group 16. Its stadium is Estadio La Estrella with a capacity of 500 seaters.

== History ==
In the 2017–18 season the club finished 15th in the Tercera División, Group 16.

== Season to season ==
Season	Tier	Division	Place	Copa del Rey
2005–06	5	Reg. Pref.	5th	
2006–07	4	3ª	15th	
2007–08	4	3ª	13th	
2008–09	4	3ª	10th	
2009–10	4	3ª	11th	
2010–11	4	3ª	12th	
2011–12	4	3ª	17th	
2012–13	4	3ª	9th	
2013–14	4	3ª	16th	
2014–15	4	3ª	16th	
2015–16	4	3ª	9th	
2016–17	4	3ª	17th	
2017–18	4	3ª	15th	
2018–19	4	3ª	17th	
2019–20	4	3ª	17th	
2020–21	4	3ª	10th / 8th	
2021–22	6	Reg. Pref.	4th	
2022–23	6	Reg. Pref.	7th	
2023–24	6	Reg. Pref.	6th	
2024–25	6	Reg. Pref.	7th	

Season	Tier	Division	Place	Copa del Rey
2025–26	6	Reg. Pref.	1st	
2026–27	5	3ª Fed.		

- 15 seasons in Tercera División
- 1 season in Tercera Federación
