= CD Agoncillo =

Spanish football club

Agoncillo
- Full name: Club Deportivo Agoncillo
- Founded: 1980
- Ground: San Roque, Agoncillo, La Rioja, Spain
- Capacity: 2,000
- Chairman: Genaro Moreno
- Manager: Israel Villarreal
- League: Tercera Federación – Group 16
- 2025–26: Tercera Federación – Group 16, 8th of 18
Home colours	Away colours

Club Deportivo Agoncillo is a Spanish football team based in Agoncillo in the autonomous community of La Rioja. Founded in 1980, it plays in Tercera Federación – Group 16. Its stadium is Estadio San Roque with a capacity of 2,000 seaters.

== History ==
In the 2017-18 season the club finished 16th in the Tercera División, Group 16.

== Season to season ==
Season	Tier	Division	Place	Copa del Rey
1982–83	7	2ª Reg.	10th	
1983–84	7	2ª Reg.	7th	
1984–85	7	2ª Reg.	8th	
1985–86	7	2ª Reg.	4th	
1986–87	6	1ª Reg.	2nd	
1987–88	5	Reg. Pref.	12th	
1988–89	5	Reg. Pref.	17th	
1989–90	6	1ª Reg.	1st	
1990–91	5	Reg. Pref.	14th	
1991–92	5	Reg. Pref.	13th	
1992–93	5	Reg. Pref.	10th	
1993–94	5	Reg. Pref.	16th	
1994–95	5	Reg. Pref.	20th	
1995–96	5	Reg. Pref.	10th	
1996–97	5	Reg. Pref.	5th	
1997–98	5	Reg. Pref.	2nd	
1998–99	5	Reg. Pref.	3rd	
1999–2000	4	3ª	16th	
2000–01	4	3ª	13th	
2001–02	4	3ª	18th	

Season	Tier	Division	Place	Copa del Rey
2002–03	5	Reg. Pref.	2nd	
2003–04	4	3ª	20th	
2004–05	4	3ª	9th	
2005–06	4	3ª	12th	
2006–07	4	3ª	8th	
2007–08	4	3ª	5th	
2008–09	4	3ª	9th	
2009–10	4	3ª	9th	
2010–11	4	3ª	16th	
2011–12	4	3ª	13th	
2012–13	4	3ª	11th	
2013–14	4	3ª	9th	
2014–15	4	3ª	8th	
2015–16	4	3ª	8th	
2016–17	4	3ª	9th	
2017–18	4	3ª	16th	
2018–19	4	3ª	19th	
2019–20	5	Reg. Pref.	2nd	
2020–21	4	3ª	9th / 4th	
2021–22	5	3ª RFEF	9th	

Season	Tier	Division	Place	Copa del Rey
2022–23	5	3ª Fed.	3rd	N/A (Note: Second reserve team of UD Logroñés.)
2023–24	6	Reg. Pref.	2nd	
2024–25	5	3ª Fed.	10th	
2025–26	5	3ª Fed.	8th	
2026–27	5	3ª Fed.		

- 20 seasons in Tercera División
- 5 seasons in Tercera Federación/Tercera División RFEF
