= Yagüe CF =

Association football club in Spain

Yagüe
- Full name: Yagüe Club de Fútbol
- Founded: 1962
- Ground: El Salvador; Logroño, La Rioja, Spain
- Capacity: 1,000
- President: (Spain) Gonzalo Espinosa
- Head coach: (Spain) Javi de Pedro
- League: Tercera Federación – Group 16
- 2025–26: Tercera Federación – Group 16, 10th of 18
| Home colours | Away colours |

Yagüe Club de Fútbol is a Spanish football team based in the Yagüe neighborhood of Logroño. The club was founded in 1962. The team currently plays in the Tercera Federación – Group 16, where it has played for six seasons. The current coach is Javier De Pedro.

A new ground is being constructed for the team to play at the local high school, El Colegio Juan Yagüe.

== Season to season ==
| Season | Tier | Division | Place | Copa del Rey |
|---|---|---|---|---|
| 1967–68 | 5 | 2ª Reg. | 3rd | |
| 1968–69 | 5 | 2ª Reg. | 3rd | |
| 1969–70 | 5 | 2ª Reg. | 1st | |
| 1970–71 | 4 | 1ª Reg. | 19th | |
| 1971–72 | 5 | 2ª Reg. | 8th | |
| 1972–73 | 5 | 2ª Reg. | 6th | |
| 1973–74 | 5 | 2ª Reg. | 10th | |
| 1974–75 | 5 | 1ª Reg. | 14th | |
| 1975–76 | 6 | 2ª Reg. | 10th | |
| 1976–77 | 6 | 2ª Reg. | 3rd | |
| 1977–78 | 6 | 1ª Reg. | 4th | |
| 1978–79 | 6 | 1ª Reg. | 6th | |
| 1979–80 | 6 | 1ª Reg. | 10th | |
| 1980–81 | 6 | 1ª Reg. | 5th | |
| 1981–82 | 6 | 1ª Reg. | 11th | |
| 1982–83 | 6 | 1ª Reg. | 2nd | |
| 1983–84 | 6 | 1ª Reg. | 1st | |
| 1984–85 | 5 | Reg. Pref. | 5th | |
| 1985–86 | 5 | Reg. Pref. | 16th | |
| 1986–87 | 5 | Reg. Pref. | 2nd | |

| Season | Tier | Division | Place | Copa del Rey |
|---|---|---|---|---|
| 1987–88 | 4 | 3ª | 19th | |
| 1988–89 | 5 | Reg. Pref. | 3rd | |
| 1989–90 | 5 | Reg. Pref. | 3rd | |
| 1990–91 | 5 | Reg. Pref. | 1st | |
| 1991–92 | 4 | 3ª | 20th | |
| 1992–93 | 5 | Reg. Pref. | 1st | |
| 1993–94 | 4 | 3ª | 18th | |
| 1994–95 | 5 | Reg. Pref. | 1st | |
| 1995–96 | 4 | 3ª | 18th | |
| 1996–97 | 5 | Reg. Pref. | 9th | |
| 1997–98 | 5 | Reg. Pref. | 2nd | |
| 1998–99 | 5 | Reg. Pref. | 5th | |
| 1999–2000 | 5 | Reg. Pref. | 5th | |
| 2000–01 | 5 | Reg. Pref. | 11th | |
| 2001–02 | 5 | Reg. Pref. | 8th | |
| 2002–03 | 5 | Reg. Pref. | 7th | |
| 2003–04 | 5 | Reg. Pref. | 12th | |
| 2004–05 | 5 | Reg. Pref. | 3rd | |
| 2005–06 | 5 | Reg. Pref. | 2nd | |
| 2006–07 | 4 | 3ª | 14th | |

| Season | Tier | Division | Place | Copa del Rey |
|---|---|---|---|---|
| 2007–08 | 4 | 3ª | 16th | |
| 2008–09 | 4 | 3ª | 15th | |
| 2009–10 | 4 | 3ª | 19th | |
| 2010–11 | 5 | Reg. Pref. | 8th | |
| 2011–12 | 5 | Reg. Pref. | 2nd | |
| 2012–13 | 4 | 3ª | 18th | |
| 2013–14 | 5 | Reg. Pref. | 4th | |
| 2014–15 | 4 | 3ª | 18th | |
| 2015–16 | 5 | Reg. Pref. | 4th | |
| 2016–17 | 5 | Reg. Pref. | 3rd | |
| 2017–18 | 4 | 3ª | 12th | |
| 2018–19 | 4 | 3ª | 9th | |
| 2019–20 | 4 | 3ª | 19th | |
| 2020–21 | 4 | 3ª | 5th / 3rd | |
| 2021–22 | 5 | 3ª RFEF | 14th | |
| 2022–23 | 5 | 3ª Fed. | 15th | |
| 2023–24 | 6 | Reg. Pref. | 1st | |
| 2024–25 | 5 | 3ª Fed. | 9th | |
| 2025–26 | 5 | 3ª Fed. | 10th | |
| 2026–27 | 5 | 3ª Fed. | | |

- 14 seasons in Tercera División
- 5 seasons in Tercera Federación/Tercera División RFEF
