= CD Berceo =

Association football club in Spain

Berceo
- Full name: Club Deportivo Berceo
- Founded: 1948; 78 years ago
- Ground: La Isla, Logroño, La Rioja, Spain
- Capacity: 2,000
- President: (Spain) Esteban Rubio
- Head coach: (Spain) José Carboneras
- League: Tercera Federación – Group 16
- 2025–26: Tercera Federación – Group 16, 12th of 18
Home colours	Away colours

Club Deportivo Berceo is a Spanish football team based in Logroño in the autonomous community of La Rioja. Founded in 1948, it plays in Tercera Federación – Group 16. Its stadium is Estadio La Isla with a capacity of 2,000 seaters.

== History ==
In the 2018-19 season the club finished 14th in the Tercera División, Group 16.

== Season to season ==
Season	Tier	Division	Place	Copa del Rey
1957–58	4	1ª Reg.	4th	
1958–59	4	1ª Reg.	7th	
1959–60	4	1ª Reg.	10th	
1960–61	4	1ª Reg.	12th	
1961–62	4	1ª Reg.	11th	
1962–63	4	1ª Reg.	9th	
1963–64	4	1ª Reg.	6th	
1964–65	4	1ª Reg.	6th	
1965–66	4	1ª Reg.	11th	
1966–67	4	1ª Reg.	11th	
1967–68	5	2ª Reg.	2nd	
1968–69	5	2ª Reg.	2nd	
1969–70	4	1ª Reg.	16th	
1970–71	5	2ª Reg.	2nd	
1971–72	5	2ª Reg.	3rd	
1972–73	5	2ª Reg.	1st	
1973–74	4	1ª Reg.	19th	
1974–75	5	1ª Reg.	2nd	
1975–76	5	1ª Reg.	5th	
1976–77	5	1ª Reg.	10th	

Season	Tier	Division	Place	Copa del Rey
1977–78	6	1ª Reg.	5th	
1978–79	6	1ª Reg.	10th	
1979–80	6	1ª Reg.	4th	
1980–81	6	1ª Reg.	4th	
1981–82	6	1ª Reg.	3rd	
1982–83	6	1ª Reg.	1st	
1983–84	5	Reg. Pref.	3rd	
1984–85	5	Reg. Pref.	2nd	
1985–86	4	3ª	16th	
1986–87	4	3ª	11th	
1987–88	4	3ª	12th	
1988–89	4	3ª	13th	
1989–90	4	3ª	5th	
1990–91	4	3ª	10th	First round
1991–92	4	3ª	18th	
1992–93	5	Reg. Pref.	1st	
1993–94	4	3ª	20th	
1994–95	5	Reg. Pref.	3rd	
1995–96	5	Reg. Pref.	7th	
1996–97	5	Reg. Pref.	2nd	

Season	Tier	Division	Place	Copa del Rey
1997–98	5	Reg. Pref.	1st	
1998–99	4	3ª	18th	
1999–2000	5	Reg. Pref.	1st	
2000–01	5	Reg. Pref.	5th	
2001–02	5	Reg. Pref.	1st	
2002–03	5	Reg. Pref.	1st	
2003–04	5	Reg. Pref.	10th	
2004–05	4	3ª	11th	
2005–06	4	3ª	15th	
2006–07	5	Reg. Pref.	4th	
2007–08	5	Reg. Pref.	2nd	
2008–09	4	3ª	11th	
2009–10	4	3ª	13th	
2010–11	4	3ª	14th	
2011–12	4	3ª	15th	
2012–13	4	3ª	13th	
2013–14	4	3ª	19th	
2014–15	5	Reg. Pref.	6th	
2015–16	5	Reg. Pref.	5th	
2016–17	5	Reg. Pref.	2nd	

Season	Tier	Division	Place	Copa del Rey
2017–18	4	3ª	9th	
2018–19	4	3ª	14th	
2019–20	4	3ª	12th	
2020–21	4	3ª	7th / 3rd	
2021–22	5	3ª RFEF	12th	
2022–23	5	3ª Fed.	12th	
2023–24	5	3ª Fed.	9th	
2024–25	5	3ª Fed.	11th	
2025–26	5	3ª Fed.	12th	
2026–27	5	3ª Fed.		

- 21 seasons in Tercera División
- 6 seasons in Tercera Federación/Tercera División RFEF

== Famous players ==
- Javi Martínez
- Borja Viguera
