= ACD San Marcial =

San Marcial
- Full name: Agrupación Cultural y Deportiva San Marcial
- Founded: 1975
- Ground: Ángel de Vicente, Lardero, La Rioja, Spain
- Capacity: 800
- President: (Spain) Ángel Luis Díaz
- Head coach: (Spain) Constantino Berzal
- League: Tercera Federación – Group 16
- 2025–26: Tercera Federación – Group 16, 11th of 18
Home colours	Away colours

Agrupación Cultural y Deportiva San Marcial is a Spanish football team based in Lardero in the autonomous community of La Rioja. Founded in 1975, it plays in Tercera Federación – Group 16.

== Season to season ==
Season	Tier	Division	Place	Copa del Rey
1973–74	6	3ª Reg.	6th	
1974–75	6	2ª Reg.	9th	
1975–76	6	2ª Reg.	6th	
1976–77	6	2ª Reg.	1st	
1977–78	6	1ª Reg.	8th	
1978–79	6	1ª Reg.	4th	
1979–80	6	1ª Reg.	14th	
1980–81	6	1ª Reg.	9th	
1981–82	6	1ª Reg.	9th	
1982–83	6	1ª Reg.	7th	
1983–84	6	1ª Reg.	10th	
1984–85	6	1ª Reg.	6th	
1985–86	6	1ª Reg.	3rd	
1986–87	5	Reg. Pref.	10th	
1987–88	5	Reg. Pref.	6th	
1988–89	5	Reg. Pref.	6th	
1989–90	5	Reg. Pref.	7th	
1990–91	5	Reg. Pref.	11th	
1991–92	5	Reg. Pref.	2nd	
1992–93	5	Reg. Pref.	6th	

Season	Tier	Division	Place	Copa del Rey
1993–94	5	Reg. Pref.	11th	
1994–95	5	Reg. Pref.	12th	
1995–96	5	Reg. Pref.	12th	
1996–97	5	Reg. Pref.	3rd	
1997–98	5	Reg. Pref.	5th	
1998–99	5	Reg. Pref.	4th	
1999–2000	5	Reg. Pref.	2nd	
2000–01	5	Reg. Pref.	3rd	
2001–02	5	Reg. Pref.	2nd	
2002–03	4	3ª	10th	
2003–04	4	3ª	16th	
2004–05	4	3ª	10th	
2005–06	4	3ª	13th	
2006–07	4	3ª	11th	
2007–08	4	3ª	12th	
2008–09	4	3ª	8th	
2009–10	4	3ª	10th	
2010–11	4	3ª	15th	
2011–12	4	3ª	16th	
2012–13	4	3ª	14th	

Season	Tier	Division	Place	Copa del Rey
2013–14	4	3ª	17th	
2014–15	5	Reg. Pref.	2nd	
2015–16	4	3ª	12th	
2016–17	4	3ª	19th	
2017–18	5	Reg. Pref.	8th	
2018–19	5	Reg. Pref.	8th	
2019–20	5	Reg. Pref.	5th	
2020–21	5	Reg. Pref.	9th	
2021–22	6	Reg. Pref.	8th	
2022–23	6	Reg. Pref.	2nd	
2023–24	6	Reg. Pref.	1st	
2024–25	6	Reg. Pref.	2nd	
2025–26	5	3ª Fed.	11th	
2026–27	5	3ª Fed.		

- 14 seasons in Tercera División
- 2 seasons in Tercera Federación
