= CD Arnedo =

Association football club in Spain

Arnedo
- Full name: Club Deportivo Arnedo
- Short name: ARN
- Founded: 1949; 77 years ago
- Stadium: Sendero
- Capacity: 5,000
- President: Ildefonso Ruiz
- Head coach: Alberto Eguizábal
- League: Segunda Federación – Group 2
- 2025–26: Tercera Federación – Group 16, 3rd of 18 (promoted via play-offs)
- Website: www.cdarnedo.com
Home colours	Away colours

Club Deportivo Arnedo is a football team based in Arnedo in the autonomous community of La Rioja. Founded in 1949, it plays in the Segunda Federación – Group 2. Its stadium is Sendero with a capacity of 5,000 seats.

== History ==
In the 2017-18 season the club finished in the 13th position in the Tercera División, Group 16.

== Season to season ==
Season	Tier	Division	Place	Copa del Rey
1949–50	5	2ª Reg.	3rd	
1950–1965	DNP			
1965–66	5	2ª Reg.	4th	
1966–67	5	2ª Reg.	1st	
1967–68	4	1ª Reg.	7th	
1968–69	4	1ª Reg.	4th	
1969–70	4	1ª Reg.	3rd	
1970–71	4	1ª Reg.	8th	
1971–72	4	1ª Reg.	10th	
1972–73	4	1ª Reg.	10th	
1973–74	4	1ª Reg.	18th	
1974–75	5	1ª Reg.	1st	
1975–76	4	Reg. Pref.	9th	
1976–77	4	Reg. Pref.	19th	
1977–78	5	Reg. Pref.	15th	
1978–79	6	1ª Reg.	1st	
1979–80	5	Reg. Pref.	1st	
1980–81	4	3ª	11th	
1981–82	4	3ª	10th	
1982–83	4	3ª	8th	

Season	Tier	Division	Place	Copa del Rey
1983–84	4	3ª	5th	
1984–85	4	3ª	5th	Second round
1985–86	4	3ª	4th	First round
1986–87	4	3ª	2nd	First round
1987–88	3	2ª B	7th	Fourth round
1988–89	3	2ª B	17th	First round
1989–90	4	3ª	9th	
1990–91	4	3ª	6th	
1991–92	4	3ª	12th	Third round
1992–93	4	3ª	14th	
1993–94	4	3ª	19th	
1994–95	5	Reg. Pref.	10th	
1995–96	5	Reg. Pref.	5th	
1996–97	5	Reg. Pref.	4th	
1997–98	5	Reg. Pref.	3rd	
1998–99	5	Reg. Pref.	4th	
1999–2000	5	Reg. Pref.	3rd	
2000–01	4	3ª	19th	
2001–02	5	Reg. Pref.	3rd	
2002–03	5	Reg. Pref.	4th	

Season	Tier	Division	Place	Copa del Rey
2003–04	5	Reg. Pref.	3rd	
2004–05	4	3ª	7th	
2005–06	4	3ª	11th	
2006–07	4	3ª	9th	
2007–08	4	3ª	8th	
2008–09	4	3ª	14th	
2009–10	4	3ª	8th	
2010–11	4	3ª	6th	
2011–12	4	3ª	10th	
2012–13	4	3ª	7th	
2013–14	4	3ª	14th	
2014–15	4	3ª	14th	
2015–16	4	3ª	17th	
2016–17	4	3ª	14th	
2017–18	4	3ª	13th	
2018–19	4	3ª	12th	
2019–20	4	3ª	4th	
2020–21	4	3ª	4th / 2nd	
2021–22	5	3ª RFEF	1st	
2022–23	4	2ª Fed.	18th	Second round

Season	Tier	Division	Place	Copa del Rey
2023–24	5	3ª Fed.	10th	
2024–25	5	3ª Fed.	4th	
2025–26	5	3ª Fed.	3rd	
2026–27	4	2ª Fed.		

- 2 seasons in Segunda División B
- 2 seasons in Segunda Federación
- 30 seasons in Tercera División
- 4 seasons in Tercera Federación/Tercera División RFEF

== Famous players ==
- (Spain) Antonio Güembe
