= Calasparra FC =

Spanish football team

Calasparra
- Full name: Calasparra Fútbol Club
- Founded: 1991
- Dissolved: 2011
- Ground: La Caverina, Calasparra, Murcia, Spain
- Capacity: 3,000
- 2010–11: 3ª – Group 13, 16th
Home colours	Away colours

Calasparra Fútbol Club was a Spanish football team based in Calasparra in the Region of Murcia. Founded in 1991 and dissolved in 2011, it held home matches at Estadio La Caverina, which had a capacity for 3,000 people.

== History ==
Calasparra first reached the fourth division in 2001, finishing in 15th position in its first season. Just before the start of the 2011–12 campaign, after one full decade in the category, the club dissolved due to economic problems.

== Season to season ==
Season	Tier	Division	Place	Copa del Rey
1994–95	6	1ª Reg.	15th	
1995–1999	DNP			
1999–2000	5	Terr. Pref.	10th	
2000–01	5	Terr. Pref.	4th	
2001–02	4	3ª	15th	
2002–03	4	3ª	17th	
2003–04	4	3ª	8th	

Season	Tier	Division	Place	Copa del Rey
2004–05	4	3ª	16th	
2005–06	4	3ª	16th	
2006–07	4	3ª	8th	
2007–08	4	3ª	6th	
2008–09	4	3ª	16th	
2009–10	4	3ª	15th	
2010–11	4	3ª	16th	

- 10 seasons in Tercera División

== Stadium ==
Estadio La Caverina
- Location: Calasparra, Murcia
- Capacity: 3,000
- Surface: Grass
- Field size: 111 yards (101 m) by 74 yards (68 m)

Tenant
- Calasparra FC

=== Club data ===
- Address: Avenida Primero de Mayo 17, 30420 Calasparra (Murcia)
- Phone: 968 72 12 40
- Website: unknown
- E-mail: unknown
