= CF Jacetano =

Spanish football team

Jacetano
- Full name: Club de Fútbol Jacetano
- Founded: 1960
- Ground: El Oroel, Jaca, Aragón, Spain
- Capacity: 2,000
- Chairman: Sebastian Sanvicente
- League: Primera Regional – Group 2
- 2024–25: Regional Preferente – Group 1, 16th of 18 (relegated)
Home colours	Away colours

Club de Fútbol Jacetano is a football team based in Jaca in the autonomous community of Aragón. Founded in 1960, it plays in the Primera Regional – Group 2. Its stadium is El Oroel with a capacity of 2,000 seats.

== Season to season ==
Season	Tier	Division	Place	Copa del Rey
1960–61	4	1ª Reg.	7th	
1961–62	DNP			
1962–63	DNP			
1963–64	4	1ª Reg.	3rd	
1964–65	4	1ª Reg.	2nd	
1965–66	3	3ª	11th	
1966–67	3	3ª	11th	
1967–68	3	3ª	13th	
1968–69	4	Reg. Pref.	9th	
1969–70	4	Reg. Pref.	15th	
1970–71	5	1ª Reg.	6th	
1971–72	5	1ª Reg.	16th	
1972–73	5	1ª Reg.	12th	
1973–74	5	1ª Reg.	3rd	
1974–75	4	Reg. Pref.	15th	
1975–76	4	Reg. Pref.	18th	
1976–77	5	1ª Reg.	2nd	
1977–78	5	Reg. Pref.	9th	
1978–79	5	Reg. Pref.	12th	
1979–80	5	Reg. Pref.	19th	

Season	Tier	Division	Place	Copa del Rey
1980–81	5	Reg. Pref.	5th	
1981–82	5	Reg. Pref.	1st	
1982–83	4	3ª	6th	
1983–84	4	3ª	20th	
1984–85	5	Reg. Pref.	19th	
1985–86	6	1ª Reg.	1st	
1986–87	5	Reg. Pref.	1st	
1987–88	4	3ª	17th	
1988–89	4	3ª	20th	
1989–90	5	Reg. Pref.	15th	
1990–91	6	1ª Reg.	12th	
1991–92	6	1ª Reg.	9th	
1992–93	6	1ª Reg.	7th	
1993–94	6	1ª Reg.	2nd	
1994–95	5	Reg. Pref.	16th	
1995–96	6	1ª Reg.	1st	
1996–97	5	Reg. Pref.	8th	
1997–98	5	Reg. Pref.	8th	
1998–99	5	Reg. Pref.	8th	
1999–2000	5	Reg. Pref.	1st	

Season	Tier	Division	Place	Copa del Rey
2000–01	4	3ª	19th	
2001–02	5	Reg. Pref.	1st	
2002–03	4	3ª	17th	
2003–04	5	Reg. Pref.	1st	
2004–05	4	3ª	9th	
2005–06	4	3ª	8th	
2006–07	4	3ª	14th	
2007–08	4	3ª	21st	
2008–09	5	Reg. Pref.	3rd	
2009–10	4	3ª	20th	
2010–11	5	Reg. Pref.	15th	
2011–12	6	1ª Reg.	4th	
2012–13	6	1ª Reg.	3rd	
2013–14	6	1ª Reg.	2nd	
2014–15	5	Reg. Pref.	18th	
2015–16	6	1ª Reg.	15th	
2016–17	6	1ª Reg.	6th	
2017–18	6	1ª Reg.	4th	
2018–19	5	Reg. Pref.	16th	
2019–20	6	1ª Reg.	5th	

Season	Tier	Division	Place	Copa del Rey
2020–21	6	1ª Reg.	2nd	
2021–22	6	Reg. Pref.	10th	
2022–23	6	Reg. Pref.	5th	
2023–24	6	Reg. Pref.	9th	
2024–25	6	Reg. Pref.	16th	
2025–26	7	1ª Reg.		

- 14 seasons in Tercera División
