= CD Tedeón =

Spanish football team

Tedeón
- Full name: Club Deportivo Tedeón
- Founded: 1947
- Ground: San Miguel, Navarrete, La Rioja, Spain
- Capacity: 2,000
- Chairman: (Spain) Pedro Díez
- Manager: (Spain) Óscar Herrero
- League: Regional Preferente
- 2025–26: Regional Preferente, 6th of 18
Home colours	Away colours

Club Deportivo Tedeón is a Spanish football team based in Navarrete in the autonomous community of La Rioja. Founded in 1947, it plays in Regional Preferente.

== Season to season ==
Season	Tier	Division	Place	Copa del Rey
1973–74	6	3ª Reg.	9th	
1974–75	6	2ª Reg.	9th	
1975–76	DNP			
1976–77	6	2ª Reg.	14th	
1977–78	7	2ª Reg.	7th	
1978–79	7	2ª Reg.	12th	
1979–1987	DNP			
1987–88	6	1ª Reg.	2nd	
1988–89	5	Reg. Pref.	10th	
1989–90	5	Reg. Pref.	15th	
1990–91	5	Reg. Pref.	15th	
1991–92	5	Reg. Pref.	7th	
1992–93	5	Reg. Pref.	8th	
1993–2002	DNP			
2002–03	5	Reg. Pref.	9th	
2003–04	5	Reg. Pref.	14th	
2004–05	5	Reg. Pref.	8th	
2005–06	5	Reg. Pref.	9th	
2006–07	5	Reg. Pref.	6th	
2007–08	5	Reg. Pref.	3rd	

Season	Tier	Division	Place	Copa del Rey
2008–09	4	3ª	18th	
2009–10	5	Reg. Pref.	7th	
2010–11	5	Reg. Pref.	1st	
2011–12	4	3ª	18th	
2012–13	5	Reg. Pref.	10th	
2013–14	5	Reg. Pref.	5th	
2014–15	4	3ª	15th	
2015–16	4	3ª	16th	
2016–17	4	3ª	13th	
2017–18	4	3ª	19th	
2018–19	5	Reg. Pref.	5th	
2019–20	5	Reg. Pref.	3rd	
2020–21	4	3ª	8th / 5th	
2021–22	6	Reg. Pref.	5th	
2022–23	6	Reg. Pref.	1st	
2023–24	5	3ª Fed.	16th	
2024–25	5	3ª Fed.	18th	
2025–26	6	Reg. Pref.	6th	
2026–27	6	Reg. Pref.		Preliminary

- 7 seasons in Tercera División
- 2 seasons in Tercera Federación
