= CD Pradejón =

Spanish association football club

Pradejón
- Full name: Club Deportivo Pradejón
- Nickname: Verdiblancos
- Founded: 1966
- Ground: Municipal, Pradejón, La Rioja, Spain
- Capacity: 1,700
- President: Julio Fernández Velasco
- Manager: Daniel Ramos
- League: Tercera Federación – Group 16
- 2025–26: Tercera Federación – Group 16, 15th of 18
Home colours	Away colours

Club Deportivo Pradejón is a football club based in Pradejón, La Rioja. Founded in 1966, they play in Tercera Federación – Group 16, holding home games at the Polideportivo Municipal de Pradejón, with a capacity of 1,700 people.

== Season to season ==
Season	Tier	Division	Place	Copa del Rey
1967–68	5	2ª Reg.	5th	
1968–69	5	2ª Reg.	7th	
1969–70	5	2ª Reg.	14th	
1970–71	6	3ª Reg.	1st	
1971–72	5	2ª Reg.	6th	
1972–73	5	2ª Reg.	12th	
1973–74	5	2ª Reg.	5th	
1974–75	5	1ª Reg.	9th	
1975–76	5	1ª Reg.	9th	
1976–77	5	1ª Reg.	12th	
1977–78	6	1ª Reg.	3rd	
1978–79	6	1ª Reg.	13th	
1979–80	6	1ª Reg.	15th	
1980–81	7	2ª Reg.	2nd	
1981–82	6	1ª Reg.	10th	
1982–83	6	1ª Reg.	17th	
1983–84	7	2ª Reg.	15th	
1984–85	7	2ª Reg.	3rd	
1985–86	7	2ª Reg.	8th	
1986–87	DNP			

Season	Tier	Division	Place	Copa del Rey
1987–88	6	1ª Reg.	10th	
1988–89	6	1ª Reg.	4th	
1989–90	6	1ª Reg.	3rd	
1990–91	5	Reg. Pref.	8th	
1991–92	5	Reg. Pref.	11th	
1992–93	5	Reg. Pref.	9th	
1993–94	5	Reg. Pref.	14th	
1994–95	5	Reg. Pref.	14th	
1995–96	5	Reg. Pref.	18th	
1996–97	5	Reg. Pref.	11th	
1997–98	5	Reg. Pref.	7th	
1998–99	5	Reg. Pref.	1st	
1999–2000	5	Reg. Pref.	8th	
2000–01	5	Reg. Pref.	2nd	
2001–02	4	3ª	20th	
2002–03	5	Reg. Pref.	3rd	
2003–04	4	3ª	17th	
2004–05	4	3ª	8th	
2005–06	4	3ª	8th	
2006–07	4	3ª	18th	

Season	Tier	Division	Place	Copa del Rey
2007–08	5	Reg. Pref.	6th	
2008–09	5	Reg. Pref.	2nd	
2009–10	4	3ª	14th	
2010–11	4	3ª	17th	
2011–12	4	3ª	14th	
2012–13	4	3ª	17th	
2013–14	4	3ª	18th	
2014–15	5	Reg. Pref.	1st	
2015–16	4	3ª	18th	
2016–17	5	Reg. Pref.	1st	
2017–18	4	3ª	10th	
2018–19	4	3ª	10th	
2019–20	4	3ª	13th	
2020–21	4	3ª	9th / 6th	
2021–22	6	Reg. Pref.	2nd	
2022–23	6	Reg. Pref.	2nd	
2023–24	6	Reg. Pref.	5th	Preliminary
2024–25	6	Reg. Pref.	1st	
2025–26	5	3ª Fed.	15th	
2026–27	5	3ª Fed.		

- 15 seasons in Tercera División
- 2 seasons in Tercera Federación
