= CD Autol =

Spanish association football club

Autol
- Full name: Club Deportivo Autol
- Nickname: Catonés
- Founded: 1972
- Ground: La Manzanera; Autol, La Rioja, Spain
- Capacity: 2,000
- Chairman: Sergio Jiménez
- Manager: Nacho Herce
- League: Regional Preferente
- 2025–26: Tercera Federación – Group 16, 17th of 18 (relegated)
Home colours	Away colours

Club Deportivo Autol is a football club based in Autol, La Rioja. Founded in 1972, they play in Regional Preferente, holding home games at the Complejo Deportivo Municipal La Manzanera, with a capacity of 2,000 people.

== Season to season ==
Season	Tier	Division	Place	Copa del Rey
1973–74	6	3ª Reg.	10th	
1974–75	6	2ª Reg.	7th	
1975–76	6	2ª Reg.	4th	
1976–77	6	2ª Reg.	2nd	
1977–78	6	1ª Reg.	14th	
1978–79	7	2ª Reg.	8th	
1979–80	7	2ª Reg.	2nd	
1980–81	6	1ª Reg.	14th	
1981–82	7	2ª Reg.	5th	
1982–83	7	2ª Reg.	9th	
1983–84	7	2ª Reg.	5th	
1984–85	6	1ª Reg.	8th	
1985–86	6	1ª Reg.	10th	
1986–87	5	Reg. Pref.	4th	
1987–88	5	Reg. Pref.	4th	
1988–89	5	Reg. Pref.	2nd	
1989–90	5	Reg. Pref.	5th	
1990–91	5	Reg. Pref.	2nd	
1991–92	4	3ª	19th	
1992–93	5	Reg. Pref.	2nd	

Season	Tier	Division	Place	Copa del Rey
1993–94	DNP			
1994–95	5	Reg. Pref.	6th	
1995–96	5	Reg. Pref.	13th	
1996–97	DNP			
1997–98	5	Reg. Pref.	11th	
1998–2005	DNP			
2005–06	5	Reg. Pref.	7th	
2006–07	4	3ª	17th	
2007–08	5	Reg. Pref.	11th	
2008–09	5	Reg. Pref.	15th	
2009–10	5	Reg. Pref.	17th	
2010–11	5	Reg. Pref.	11th	
2011–12	5	Reg. Pref.	10th	
2012–13	5	Reg. Pref.	11th	
2013–14	5	Reg. Pref.	8th	
2014–15	5	Reg. Pref.	7th	
2015–16	5	Reg. Pref.	6th	
2016–17	5	Reg. Pref.	5th	
2017–18	5	Reg. Pref.	1st	
2018–19	4	3ª	20th	

Season	Tier	Division	Place	Copa del Rey
2019–20	5	Reg. Pref.	4th	
2020–21	5	Reg. Pref.	7th	
2021–22	6	Reg. Pref.	2nd	
2022–23	6	Reg. Pref.	6th	First round
2023–24	6	Reg. Pref.	2nd	
2024–25	5	3ª Fed.	15th	
2025–26	5	3ª Fed.		

- 3 seasons in Tercera División
- 2 seasons in Tercera Federación
