= CD Villegas =

Association football club in Spain

Villegas
- Full name: Club Deportivo Villegas
- Founded: 1974
- Ground: La Ribera, Logroño, La Rioja, Spain
- Capacity: 800
- Chairman: (Spain) Eva María Aguado
- Manager: (Spain) Alberto Tricio
- League: Tercera Federación – Group 16
- 2024–25: Regional Preferente – Group 2, 3rd of 17
Home colours	Away colours

Club Deportivo Villegas is a Spanish football team based in Logroño in the autonomous community of La Rioja. Founded in 1974, it plays in Tercera Federación – Group 16.

== Season to season ==
Season	Tier	Division	Place	Copa del Rey
1979–80	7	2ª Reg.	1st	
1980–81	6	1ª Reg.	8th	
1981–82	6	1ª Reg.	13th	
1982–83	6	1ª Reg.	10th	
1983–1997	DNP			
1997–98	5	Reg. Pref.	9th	
1998–99	5	Reg. Pref.	2nd	
1999–2000	5	Reg. Pref.	5th	
2000–01	5	Reg. Pref.	4th	
2001–02	5	Reg. Pref.	5th	
2002–03	5	Reg. Pref.	6th	
2003–04	5	Reg. Pref.	6th	
2004–05	4	3ª	14th	
2005–06	4	3ª	16th	
2006–07	5	Reg. Pref.	1st	
2007–08	4	3ª	17th	
2008–09	4	3ª	13th	
2009–10	4	3ª	18th	
2010–11	5	Reg. Pref.	9th	
2011–12	5	Reg. Pref.	1st	

Season	Tier	Division	Place	Copa del Rey
2012–13	4	3ª	16th	
2013–14	4	3ª	15th	
2014–15	4	3ª	17th	
2015–16	4	3ª	14th	
2016–17	4	3ª	16th	
2017–18	4	3ª	20th	
2018–19	5	Reg. Pref.	4th	
2019–20	4	3ª	20th	
2020–21	4	3ª	11th / 10th	
2021–22	6	Reg. Pref.	5th	
2022–23	6	Reg. Pref.	7th	
2023–24	6	Reg. Pref.	4th	
2024–25	6	Reg. Pref.	3rd	
2025–26	5	3ª Fed.		

- 12 seasons in Tercera División
- 1 season in Tercera Federación
