= 2007–08 Tercera División =

Tercera División
- Season: 2007–08
- Promoted: Ciudad Santiago; Sporting B; Racing B; Barcelona Atlètic; Sant Andreu; Alzira; Valencia Mestalla; Navalcarnero; Roquetas; Antequera; San Fernando; Linense; Atlético Baleares; Santa Eulàlia; Las Palmas Atlético; Ciudad Lorquí; Sangonera Atl.; Real Murcia B; Alfaro

The season 2007–08 Tercera División was fourth tier of football in Spain. Play started on 26 August 2007 and ended 18 May 2008.

== Overview ==
There were 364 clubs competing in Tercera División (Third division) in the 2007–08 season, divided into 18 regional groups, each accommodating between 20 and 21 clubs.

The following clubs finished as champions of their respective groups

- Grupo I (Galicia) - Ciudad Santiago
- Grupo II (Asturias) - Real Oviedo
- Grupo III (Cantabria) - Gimn. Torrelavega
- Grupo IV (País Vasco) - Portugalete
- Grupo V (Cataluña) - Barcelona Atlètic
- Grupo VI (Comunidad Valenciana) - Alzira
- Grupo VII (Comunidad de Madrid) - Ciempozuelos
- Grupo VIII (Castilla & León) - Mirandés
- Grupo IX (Andalucía Oriental (Almería, Granada, Jaén & Málaga) & Melilla) - Roquetas
- Grupo X (Andalucía Occidental (Cádiz, Córdoba, Huelva & Sevilla) & Ceuta) - San Fernando
- Grupo XI (Islas Baleares) - Atlético Baleares
- Grupo XII (Canarias) - Atlético Granadilla
- Grupo XIII (Región de Murcia) - Ciudad Lorquí
- Grupo XIV (Extremadura) - Don Benito
- Grupo XV (Navarra) - Izarra
- Grupo XVI (La Rioja) - Alfaro
- Grupo XVII (Aragón) - Ejea
- Grupo XVIII (Castilla-La Mancha) - Toledo

The top 4 teams from each regional group were eligible to progress to the promotion playoffs divided into 18 sub-groups. The 18 sub-group winners were promoted to Segunda División B.

== League standings ==
Key to colours in league table:
Promoted via playoffs
Participated in playoffs
Direct relegation

=== Group I - Galicia ===
Pos	Team	Pld	W	D	L	GF	GA	GD	Pts	Qualification or relegation
1	Ciudad Santiago (P)	38	25	7	6	72	30	+42	82	Play-off
2	Lalín	38	21	15	2	60	33	+27	78	Play-off
3	Narón	38	21	8	9	74	44	+30	71	Play-off
4	Coruxo	38	18	12	8	52	27	+25	66	Play-off
5	Cerceda	38	19	8	11	56	36	+20	65	
6	Villalonga	38	16	12	10	50	40	+10	60	
7	Alondras	38	15	11	12	50	41	+9	56	
8	Montañeros	38	13	14	11	48	39	+9	53	
9	Rápido Bouzas	38	13	13	12	38	38	0	52	
10	Órdenes	38	14	10	14	44	47	−3	52	
11	Arosa	38	14	7	17	48	59	−11	49	
12	Verín	38	13	9	16	36	46	−10	48	
13	Santa Comba	38	13	8	17	44	54	−10	47	
14	Céltiga	38	11	12	15	46	46	0	45	
15	Portonovo	38	11	12	15	41	48	−7	45	
16	Negreira	38	11	11	16	39	52	−13	44	
17	Pontevedra B	38	9	14	15	44	48	−4	41	
18	Betanzos (R)	38	11	8	19	36	54	−18	41	
19	Ourense B (R)	38	3	12	23	33	78	−45	21	
20	Lemos (R)	38	5	5	28	18	69	−51	20	

(P) Promoted; (R) Relegated

Top scorer

Cuéllar	20
Pardo	16
Soares	14
Felipe	14

Goalkeeper

0,73	22/30	Jorge Pérez	Coruxo
0,86	33/38	Parada	Lalín

=== Group II - Asturias ===
Pos	Team	Pld	W	D	L	GF	GA	GD	Pts	Qualification or relegation
1	Real Oviedo	38	28	4	6	87	25	+62	88	Play-off
2	Sporting B (P)	38	22	6	10	74	43	+31	72	Play-off
3	Langreo	38	21	7	10	59	37	+22	70	Play-off
4	Universidad Oviedo	38	20	10	8	72	42	+30	70	Play-off
5	Cudillero	38	18	14	6	49	34	+15	68	
6	Tuilla	38	18	13	7	62	44	+18	67	
7	Caudal	38	18	11	9	68	47	+21	65	
8	Lealtad	38	17	11	10	46	37	+9	62	
9	Ribadesella	38	16	11	11	54	43	+11	59	
10	Llanes	38	13	16	9	50	39	+11	55	
11	Real Avilés Ind.	38	14	12	12	49	46	+3	54	
12	Ceares	38	14	8	16	53	55	−2	50	
13	Navarro	38	12	11	15	33	42	−9	47	
14	Siero	38	10	12	16	59	67	−8	42	
15	Astur	38	10	6	22	43	79	−36	36	
16	Candás	38	10	6	22	45	71	−26	36	
17	Condal	38	8	10	20	38	58	−20	34	
18	Real Tapia (R)	38	8	9	21	40	70	−30	33	
19	Hispano (R)	38	5	5	28	31	89	−58	20	
20	Colloto (R)	38	3	8	27	37	81	−44	17	

(P) Promoted; (R) Relegated

Top scorer

Cervero	26
C. Álvarez	21
Pantín	20

Goalkeeper

0,67	23/34	Aulestia	R. Oviedo
0,83	26/31	Ardura	Langreo
0,84	27/32	Noguerol	Cudillero

=== Group III - Cantabria ===
Pos	Team	Pld	W	D	L	GF	GA	GD	Pts	Qualification or relegation
1	Gimn. Torrelavega	38	32	4	2	113	25	+88	100	Play-off
2	Racing B (P)	38	27	7	4	103	31	+72	88	Play-off
3	Noja	38	23	9	6	73	26	+47	78	Play-off
4	Escobedo	38	23	8	7	94	35	+59	77	Play-off
5	Velarde	38	22	9	7	66	41	+25	75	
6	Reocín	38	23	4	11	67	34	+33	73	
7	Bezana	38	17	8	13	69	54	+15	59	
8	Tropezón	38	17	6	15	50	46	+4	57	
9	Laredo	38	15	9	14	55	57	−2	54	
10	Ribamontán	38	13	7	18	52	64	−12	46	
11	Atlético Deva	38	10	14	14	31	50	−19	44	
12	Santoña	38	12	6	20	36	54	−18	42	
13	Siete Villas	38	10	10	18	33	53	−20	40	
14	Castro	38	10	9	19	44	69	−25	39	
15	Cultural Guarnizo	38	8	13	17	32	51	−19	37	
16	Barreda	38	10	5	23	25	70	−45	35	
17	Atlético Albericia	38	7	13	18	35	72	−37	34	
18	Trasmiera (R)	38	9	7	22	30	66	−36	34	
19	Gama (R)	38	9	4	25	36	80	−44	31	
20	Buelna (R)	38	5	4	29	35	101	−66	19	

(P) Promoted; (R) Relegated

Top scorer

29	Cristian	Gimnástica
27	S. Ruíz	Bezana
26	Quino	Reocín

Goalkeeper

0,56	18/32	Melero	Gimnástica
0,92	26/29	Manu	Reocín
1	27/27	M. Díez	Escobedo

=== Group IV - Basque Country ===
Pos	Team	Pld	W	D	L	GF	GA	GD	Pts	Qualification or relegation
1	Portugalete	38	20	9	9	56	31	+25	69	Play-off
2	Gernika	38	20	8	10	52	37	+15	68	Play-off
3	Amurrio	38	18	13	7	55	30	+25	67	Play-off
4	Zamudio	38	19	9	10	56	40	+16	66	Play-off
5	Basconia	38	17	14	7	51	35	+16	65	
6	Lagun Onak	38	18	9	11	50	32	+18	63	
7	Zalla	38	19	6	13	53	47	+6	63	
8	Eibar B	38	16	10	12	60	47	+13	58	
9	Santurtzi	38	13	12	13	34	44	−10	51	
10	Amorebieta	38	12	13	13	46	47	−1	49	
11	Elgoibar	38	11	14	13	37	40	−3	47	
12	Arenas Club	38	11	13	14	39	44	−5	46	
13	Alavés B	38	10	15	13	39	37	+2	45	
14	Beasain	38	10	13	15	43	52	−9	43	
15	Laudio	38	10	12	16	36	38	−2	42	
16	Zarautz	38	9	14	15	28	43	−15	41	
17	Cultural Durango	38	9	14	15	42	51	−9	41	
18	San Pedro (R)	38	10	11	17	37	52	−15	41	
19	Tolosa (R)	38	10	9	19	37	53	−16	39	
20	Vitoria (R)	38	5	8	25	34	85	−51	23	

(R) Relegated

Top scorer

20	Igarki	Portugalete
14	David Pereda	Zalla UC
13	Zulueta	Zamudio

Goalkeeper

0,78	29/37	Urtzi	Amurrio
0,82	28/34	Urko	Portugalete

=== Grupo V - Catalonia ===
Pos	Team	Pld	W	D	L	GF	GA	GD	Pts	Qualification or relegation
1	Barcelona Atlètic (P)	38	25	8	5	70	41	+29	83	Play-off
2	Sant Andreu (P)	38	25	7	6	74	25	+49	82	Play-off
3	Reus	38	18	11	9	63	37	+26	65	Play-off
4	Santboià	38	15	15	8	45	32	+13	60	Play-off
5	Rapitenca	38	16	11	11	51	43	+8	59	
6	Palamós	38	17	7	14	46	41	+5	58	
7	Premià	38	15	10	13	65	52	+13	55	
8	Pobla Mafumet	38	15	7	16	52	45	+7	52	
9	Banyoles	38	14	9	15	39	48	−9	51	
10	Balaguer	38	12	14	12	46	45	+1	50	
11	Europa	38	14	8	16	51	49	+2	50	
12	Vilanova	38	14	7	17	58	53	+5	49	
13	Manlleu	38	14	6	18	52	62	−10	48	
14	Cassà	38	12	12	14	49	58	−9	48	
15	Blanes	38	13	9	16	52	61	−9	48	
16	Mataró	38	12	12	14	42	48	−6	48	
17	Castelldefels (Note: 2nd team of Miapuesta Castelldefels) (R)	38	12	9	17	40	54	−14	45	
18	Igualada (R)	38	8	13	17	45	68	−23	37	
19	Manresa (R)	38	8	11	19	37	58	−21	35	
20	Masnou (R)	38	5	6	27	27	84	−57	21	

(P) Promoted; (R) Relegated
Notes:

Top scorer

Molina	21
Eloi	16
Triguero	16

Goalkeeper

0,67	21/31	Aurreko	Sant Andreu
0,84	32/38	Leva	Santboià
0,93	29/31	Pociello	Reus

=== Grupo VI - Valencian Community ===
Pos	Team	Pld	W	D	L	GF	GA	GD	Pts	Qualification or relegation
1	Alzira (P)	40	23	10	7	64	28	+36	79	Play-off
2	Valencia Mestalla (P)	40	21	12	7	66	26	+40	75	Play-off
3	La Nucía	40	21	9	10	59	32	+27	72	Play-off
4	Catarroja	40	22	6	12	60	38	+22	72	Play-off
5	Eldense	40	19	13	8	54	34	+20	70	
6	Novelda	40	18	15	7	58	38	+20	69	
7	Utiel	40	18	10	12	55	43	+12	64	
8	Villarreal C	40	16	7	17	45	47	−2	55	
9	Onda	40	14	11	15	49	46	+3	53	
10	Jove Español	40	14	11	15	39	45	−6	53	
11	Burjassot	40	13	13	14	41	41	0	52	
12	Puçol	40	15	6	19	39	53	−14	51	
13	Crevillente	40	13	11	16	32	35	−3	50	
14	Castellón B	40	15	5	20	40	59	−19	50	
15	Torrevieja	40	12	13	15	51	55	−4	49	
16	Juventud B.C.	40	13	8	19	43	50	−7	47	
17	Pego	40	13	8	19	43	59	−16	47	
18	Tháder (R)	40	12	9	19	37	54	−17	45	
19	Olímpic Xàtiva (R)	40	12	7	21	36	53	−17	43	
20	Elche Ilicitano (R)	40	7	12	21	36	65	−29	33	
21	Alone (R)	40	9	4	27	34	80	−46	31	

(P) Promoted; (R) Relegated

Top scorer

Pomer	25
García	19
Sandaza	18

Goalkeeper

0,64	20/31	Guaita	Mestalla
0,83	31/37	Tomás	Eldense
0,84	28/33	Deusto	Crevillente

=== Group VII - Community of Madrid ===
Pos	Team	Pld	W	D	L	GF	GA	GD	Pts	Qualification or relegation
1	Ciempozuelos	40	24	9	7	74	36	+38	81	Play-off
2	Navalcarnero (P)	40	24	5	11	69	49	+20	77	Play-off
3	Alcalá	40	22	10	8	68	35	+33	76	Play-off
4	Móstoles	40	21	11	8	49	29	+20	74	Play-off
5	Getafe B	40	19	14	7	54	33	+21	71	
6	Parla	40	19	13	8	58	33	+25	70	
7	Alcobendas Sport	40	19	11	10	57	36	+21	68	
8	Atlético Pinto	40	18	11	11	55	34	+21	65	
9	Real Madrid C	40	18	6	16	58	52	+6	60	
10	Atlético Madrid C	40	16	10	14	72	64	+8	58	
11	Las Rozas	40	16	8	16	43	47	−4	56	
12	Rayo Majadahonda	40	14	11	15	40	42	−2	53	
13	Rayo Vallecano B	40	12	15	13	40	31	+9	51	
14	Puerta Bonita	40	10	15	15	43	51	−8	45	
15	Collado Villalba	40	13	6	21	52	58	−6	45	
16	Pozuelo Alarcón	40	11	10	19	45	59	−14	43	
17	San Fernando (R)	40	10	12	18	34	58	−24	42	
18	Humanes (R)	40	8	8	24	42	86	−44	32	
19	Villaviciosa Odón (R)	40	7	9	24	37	74	−37	30	
20	Torrejón (R)	40	7	8	25	30	70	−40	29	
21	Unión Adarve (R)	40	6	10	24	35	78	−43	28	

(P) Promoted; (R) Relegated

Top scorer

Marín	24
M. Ramos	17
Q. Lorenzo	14

Goalkeeper

0,8	29/36	Roberto	Alcob. Sport
0,82	28/34	Juancho	Alcalá

=== Group VIII - Castilla and León ===
Pos	Team	Pld	W	D	L	GF	GA	GD	Pts	Qualification or relegation
1	Mirandés	38	29	8	1	82	20	+62	95	Play-off
2	Gimnástica Segoviana	38	21	11	6	75	28	+47	74	Play-off
3	Real Ávila	38	20	12	6	70	33	+37	72	Play-off
4	Arandina	38	18	9	11	54	38	+16	63	Play-off
5	Atlético Bembibre	38	17	10	11	40	31	+9	61	
6	Salmantino	38	16	10	12	60	50	+10	58	
7	Norma	38	14	13	11	40	41	−1	55	
8	Huracán Z	38	13	15	10	44	36	+8	54	
9	Numancia B	38	14	11	13	45	51	−6	53	
10	Santa Marta	38	14	9	15	43	46	−3	51	
11	Almazán	38	14	9	15	49	53	−4	51	
12	Íscar	38	12	12	14	45	45	0	48	
13	Cultural Leonesa B	38	14	6	18	46	56	−10	48	
14	La Granja	38	11	10	17	42	45	−3	43	
15	Becerril	38	9	13	16	44	57	−13	40	
16	Ponferradina B (R)	38	10	9	19	40	64	−24	39	
17	Laguna (R)	38	8	14	16	36	57	−21	38	
18	Cristo Atlético (R)	38	10	7	21	39	66	−27	37	
19	Burgos B (R)	38	7	16	15	33	50	−17	37	
20	Hullera VL (R)	38	5	4	29	21	81	−60	19	

(R) Relegated

Top scorer

Gustavo	27
Infante	22
Dani	17
Ferrer	17
Mariano	17

Goalkeeper

0,48	13/27	Triviño	Mirandés
0,74	20/27	Manu	Bembibre

=== Group IX - Eastern Andalusia and Melilla ===
Pos	Team	Pld	W	D	L	GF	GA	GD	Pts	Qualification or relegation
1	Roquetas (P)	40	25	10	5	87	36	+51	85	Play-off
2	Antequera (P)	40	23	10	7	64	31	+33	79	Play-off
3	Granada Atlético	40	19	15	6	63	27	+36	72	Play-off
4	Vélez	40	19	11	10	62	42	+20	68	Play-off
5	Poli Ejido B	40	19	9	12	63	36	+27	66	
6	Arenas de Armilla	40	17	13	10	45	34	+11	64	
7	Alhaurino	40	18	9	13	52	47	+5	63	
8	Almería B	40	17	9	14	59	43	+16	60	
9	Motril	40	17	7	16	59	61	−2	58	
10	Comarca de Níjar	40	17	6	17	49	52	−3	57	
11	Granada 74	40	16	8	16	56	50	+6	56	
12	Ciudad Vícar	40	16	8	16	48	45	+3	56	
13	Mengíbar	40	16	6	18	65	49	+16	54	
14	Vera	40	15	6	19	73	66	+7	51	
15	Málaga B	40	12	14	14	50	46	+4	50	
16	Adra	40	13	11	16	53	53	0	50	
17	Loja	40	12	14	14	42	48	−6	50	
18	Fuengirola L.B. (R)	40	13	7	20	41	67	−26	46	
19	Alhaurín Torre (R)	40	8	12	20	47	73	−26	36	
20	Torredonjimeno (R)	40	9	4	27	39	102	−63	31	
21	Peña Ciudad Melilla (R)	40	3	3	34	13	122	−109	9 (Note: Peña Cdad. Melilla -3 pts.)	

(P) Promoted; (R) Relegated
Notes:

Top scorer

Julio	21
Juanma	19
Oscar	18

Goalkeeper

0,71	27/38	Bacas	Granada At.
0,88	30/34	Fernández	Arenas Arm.
0,89	35/39	Manolo	Ejido B

=== Group X - Western Andalusia and Ceuta ===
Pos	Team	Pld	W	D	L	GF	GA	GD	Pts	Qualification or relegation
1	San Fernando (P)	38	23	9	6	64	36	+28	78	Play-off
2	Puerto Real	38	20	10	8	64	42	+22	70	Play-off
3	Linense (P)	38	17	18	3	63	32	+31	69	Play-off
4	Villanueva	38	19	10	9	47	32	+15	67	Play-off
5	Pozoblanco	38	18	12	8	52	38	+14	66	
6	Atlético Sanluqueño	38	18	8	12	57	43	+14	62	
7	Los Palacios	38	15	16	7	54	34	+20	61	
8	Sevilla C	38	15	15	8	53	42	+11	60	
9	Los Barrios	38	15	9	14	45	39	+6	54	
10	Mairena	38	13	11	14	47	39	+8	50	
11	Cádiz B	38	13	10	15	54	56	−2	49	
12	San Roque Lepe	38	12	10	16	40	50	−10	46	
13	Córdoba B	38	12	8	18	44	63	−19	44	
14	Jerez Industrial	38	11	8	19	35	49	−14	41	
15	Dos Hermanas	38	10	10	18	34	49	−15	40	
16	Ayamonte	38	11	7	20	36	58	−22	40	
17	Cartaya	38	10	9	19	39	61	−22	39	
18	Cerro del Águila (R)	38	9	11	18	35	53	−18	38	
19	Arcos (R)	38	9	7	22	34	55	−21	34	
20	Xerez B (R)	38	6	10	22	30	56	−26	28	

(P) Promoted; (R) Relegated

Top scorer

Carrasco	23
Puli	20
Bienve	17

Goalkeeper

0,84	32/38	B. Pérez	Linense
0,85	29/34	O. Benito	Villanueva
0,88	31/35	P. Muñóz	Los Barrios

=== Group XI - Balearic Islands ===
Pos	Team	Pld	W	D	L	GF	GA	GD	Pts	Qualification or relegation
1	Atlético Baleares (P)	38	25	9	4	83	33	+50	84	Play-off
2	Mallorca B	38	24	11	3	72	25	+47	83	Play-off
3	Santa Eulàlia (P)	38	24	5	9	65	34	+31	77	Play-off
4	Santanyí	38	23	6	9	77	41	+36	75	Play-off
5	Ferriolense	38	20	7	11	66	39	+27	67	
6	Constancia	38	20	6	12	51	32	+19	66	
7	Binissalem	38	19	9	10	65	42	+23	66	
8	Alcúdia	38	18	6	14	41	36	+5	60	
9	Sporting Mahonés	38	14	11	13	38	33	+5	53	
10	Manacor	38	14	10	14	48	40	+8	52	
11	Atlètic de Ciutadella	38	12	15	11	48	37	+11	51	
12	Poblense	38	13	10	15	62	53	+9	49	
13	Soledad	38	12	8	18	45	56	−11	44	
14	Cala D'Or	38	11	10	17	49	69	−20	43	
15	Montuïri	38	9	15	14	47	54	−7	42	
16	Alaior	38	12	6	20	40	64	−24	42	
17	Artà	38	6	12	20	47	91	−44	30	
18	Margaritense (R)	38	7	5	26	34	91	−57	26	
19	Serverense (R)	38	6	8	24	27	77	−50	26	
20	Atlético Villacarlos (R)	38	1	11	26	28	86	−58	14	

(P) Promoted; (R) Relegated

Top scorer

Sala	24
Mora	22
Tino	19

Goalkeeper

0,48	13/27	Pulpo	Mallorca B
0,8	24/30	Eloi	Mahonés
0,83	30/36	Moro	Sta. Eulalia

=== Grupo XII - Canary Islands ===
Pos	Team	Pld	W	D	L	GF	GA	GD	Pts	Qualification or relegation
1	Atlético Granadilla	38	20	14	4	68	36	+32	74	Play-off
2	Las Palmas Atlético (P)	38	21	10	7	60	36	+24	73	Play-off
3	Gáldar	38	22	7	9	47	25	+22	73	Play-off
4	Castillo	38	20	8	10	58	36	+22	68	Play-off
5	Las Zocas	38	17	9	12	56	42	+14	60	
6	Tenisca	38	16	9	13	46	39	+7	57	
7	Teguise	38	14	15	9	33	26	+7	57	
8	Orientación Marítima	38	16	9	13	53	50	+3	57	
9	Universidad LP B	38	15	11	12	47	45	+2	56	
10	Laguna	38	16	7	15	55	43	+12	55	
11	Victoria	38	12	13	13	55	48	+7	49	
12	Villa Santa Brígida B	38	11	14	13	36	48	−12	47	
13	Tenerife B	38	12	10	16	42	46	−4	46	
14	Tijarafe	38	12	9	17	44	55	−11	45	
15	Tegueste	38	11	12	15	36	44	−8	45	
16	Marino	38	12	7	19	42	46	−4	43	
17	Unión Antigua (Note: resigned their place)	38	11	11	16	35	42	−7	41 (Note: Unión Antigua -3 pts.)	
18	Balos (R)	38	9	10	19	38	62	−24	37	
19	Ibarra (R)	38	10	4	24	36	61	−25	34	
20	Atlético Arona (R)	38	4	9	25	34	91	−57	21	

(P) Promoted; (R) Relegated
Notes:

Top scorer

Jonny	20
Ezequiel	18
R. Pulido	17
Airan	17

Goalkeeper

0,67	25/37	Tato	Gáldar
0,67	25/37	Floro	Teguise

=== Grupo XIII - Region of Murcia ===
Pos	Team	Pld	W	D	L	GF	GA	GD	Pts	Qualification or relegation
1	Ciudad Lorquí	38	28	9	1	84	29	+55	93	Play-off
2	Sangonera Atl. (P)	38	22	13	3	78	34	+44	79	Play-off
3	Real Murcia B (P)	38	24	7	7	75	30	+45	79	Play-off
4	Caravaca	38	22	10	6	93	38	+55	76	Play-off
5	Pinatar	38	21	12	5	90	38	+52	75	
6	Calasparra	38	18	11	9	62	45	+17	65	
7	La Unión	38	16	14	8	55	39	+16	62	
8	Las Palas (Note: Defunct)	38	16	12	10	60	44	+16	60	
9	Moratalla	38	17	8	13	56	41	+15	59	
10	Cieza	38	15	10	13	66	61	+5	55	
11	Santomera	38	14	11	13	46	44	+2	53	
12	Yeclano	38	14	7	17	62	54	+8	49	
13	Muleño	38	14	3	21	43	64	−21	45	
14	Jumilla	38	10	9	19	45	66	−21	39	
15	Lorca Dep. B	38	11	4	23	39	53	−14	37	
16	Ciudad de Lorca	38	10	4	24	50	98	−48	34	
17	Bala Azul	38	8	9	21	42	71	−29	33	
18	Olímpico Totana (R)	38	8	5	25	41	91	−50	29	
19	Alquerías (R)	38	5	7	26	27	83	−56	22	
20	Ceutí Atlético (R)	38	4	1	33	25	116	−91	13	

(P) Promoted; (R) Relegated
Notes:

Top scorer

Copito	34
Quintana	21
Andrés	21

Goalkeeper

0,7	22/31	Zapata	Lorquí
0,9	29/32	Paco	Pinatar
0,91	33/36	C. Gálvez	La Unión

=== Group XIV - Extremadura ===
Pos	Team	Pld	W	D	L	GF	GA	GD	Pts	Qualification or relegation
1	Don Benito	38	24	10	4	70	18	+52	82	Play-off
2	Cerro Reyes	38	22	12	4	78	33	+45	78	Play-off
3	Villanovense	38	21	11	6	73	35	+38	74	Play-off
4	Jerez	38	20	10	8	58	38	+20	70	Play-off
5	Plasencia	38	21	5	12	58	33	+25	68	
6	Diter Zafra	38	17	12	9	51	27	+24	63	
7	Sp. Villanueva	38	15	14	9	44	34	+10	59	
8	Badajoz	38	16	10	12	54	39	+15	58	
9	Cacereño	38	16	7	15	48	45	+3	55	
10	Moralo	38	13	9	16	41	55	−14	48	
11	Imperio Mérida	38	12	11	15	54	46	+8	47	
12	La Estrella	38	12	7	19	36	47	−11	43	
13	Olivenza	38	12	6	20	32	64	−32	42	
14	Valdivia	38	10	12	16	45	59	−14	42	
15	Miajadas	38	10	9	19	31	46	−15	39	
16	Valdelacalzada	38	9	12	17	42	64	−22	39	
17	Sanvicenteño	38	11	5	22	34	75	−41	38	
18	Atlético Pueblonuevo (R)	38	9	11	18	33	51	−18	38	
19	Santa Amalia (R)	38	9	9	20	39	68	−29	36	
20	Villafranca (R)	38	7	6	25	35	79	−44	27	

(R) Relegated

Top scorer

Rai	19
Chapi	19
Tiago	18

Goalkeeper

0,4	15/37	Pachi	Don Benito
0,65	21/32	Moisés	Diter Zafra
0,77	21/27	Manu	Cerro Reyes

=== Group XV - Navarra ===
Pos	Team	Pld	W	D	L	GF	GA	GD	Pts	Qualification or relegation
1	Izarra	38	24	9	5	63	32	+31	81	Play-off
2	Mutilvera	38	22	8	8	57	42	+15	74	Play-off
3	Iruña	38	22	8	8	70	34	+36	74	Play-off
4	Tudelano	38	20	10	8	64	35	+29	70	Play-off
5	San Juan	38	20	9	9	58	33	+25	69	
6	Valle de Egués	38	19	10	9	53	33	+20	67	
7	Aluvión	38	18	11	9	55	35	+20	65	
8	Murchante	38	14	13	11	44	37	+7	55	
9	Chantrea	38	14	13	11	43	45	−2	55	
10	Lourdes	38	16	6	16	58	51	+7	54	
11	Aoiz	38	14	10	14	40	34	+6	52	
12	Oberena	38	13	7	18	42	57	−15	46	
13	River Ega	38	12	10	16	48	56	−8	46	
14	Atl. Cirbonero	38	12	10	16	43	50	−7	46	
15	Ardoi	38	11	7	20	46	66	−20	40	
16	Huarte	38	7	13	18	40	60	−20	34	
17	Idoya	38	7	10	21	42	62	−20	31	
18	Atlético Artajonés (R)	38	8	6	24	44	66	−22	30	
19	Zarramonza (R)	38	6	11	21	34	78	−44	29	
20	Burladés (R)	38	8	5	25	26	64	−38	29	

(R) Relegated

Top scorer

Armendáriz	23
Falces	21
A. Santos	20
M. Arce	20

Goalkeeper

0,62	18/29	Fernando	Iruña
0,8	24/30	Jorge	V. Egües
0,81	22/27	Iván	Aoiz

=== Group XVI - La Rioja ===
Pos	Team	Pld	W	D	L	GF	GA	GD	Pts	Qualification or relegation
1	Alfaro (Note: CD Logroñés relegated to 3ª, took their place.) (P)	38	26	10	2	111	31	+80	88	Play-off
2	Anguiano	38	27	5	6	75	27	+48	86	Play-off
3	Haro	38	26	6	6	101	34	+67	84	Play-off
4	Calahorra	38	24	10	4	79	27	+52	82	Play-off
5	Agoncillo	38	21	7	10	62	52	+10	70	
6	Varea	38	20	8	10	60	34	+26	68	
7	Náxara	38	19	8	11	73	40	+33	65	
8	Arnedo	38	18	6	14	57	41	+16	60	
9	Oyonesa	38	18	6	14	71	48	+23	60	
10	River Ebro	38	15	11	12	40	31	+9	56	
11	Fundación Logroñés	38	15	5	18	64	84	−20	50	
12	San Marcial	38	11	12	15	47	50	−3	45	
13	Calasancio	38	11	5	22	45	77	−32	38	
14	Alberite	38	8	14	16	33	50	−17	38	
15	Cenicero	38	9	8	21	40	76	−36	35	
16	Yagüe	38	9	7	22	32	68	−36	34	
17	Villegas	38	8	6	24	29	87	−58	30	
18	Atl. Vianés (R)	38	6	12	20	35	74	−39	30	
19	Rápid de Murillo (R)	38	8	5	25	32	85	−53	29	
20	Ciudad de Alfaro (R)	38	3	5	30	26	96	−70	14	

(P) Promoted; (R) Relegated
Notes:

Top scorer

Sola	32
A. Leiva	31
Joseba	26

Goalkeeper

0,62	19/28	Josean	Anguiano
0,81	31/38	Roberto	River Ebro
0,93	30/32	Chuchi	Varea

=== Group XVII - Aragón ===
Pos	Team	Pld	W	D	L	GF	GA	GD	Pts	Qualification or relegation
1	Ejea	40	29	6	5	95	37	+58	93	Play-off
2	Barbastro	40	27	7	6	102	24	+78	88	Play-off
3	Teruel	40	25	9	6	73	29	+44	84	Play-off
4	Atl. Monzón	40	24	9	7	76	34	+42	81	Play-off
5	Andorra	40	24	9	7	74	45	+29	81	
6	Real Zaragoza B	40	24	8	8	84	38	+46	80	
7	Villanueva	40	20	11	9	65	46	+19	71	
8	Sariñena	40	17	7	16	59	52	+7	58	
9	Atl. Calatayud	40	14	11	15	40	39	+1	53	
10	Sabiñánigo	40	13	13	14	51	57	−6	52	
11	Utebo	40	14	9	17	56	65	−9	51	
12	San Lorenzo	40	12	7	21	48	74	−26	43	
13	Binéfar	40	12	7	21	42	71	−29	43	
14	Cuarte Industrial	40	11	10	19	52	81	−29	43	
15	Brea	40	13	4	23	52	91	−39	43	
16	Fraga	40	10	10	20	41	66	−25	40	
17	Ebro (R)	40	11	7	22	40	65	−25	40	
18	Figueruelas (R)	40	9	10	21	38	64	−26	37	
19	Illueca (R)	40	8	9	23	43	78	−35	33	
20	Peñas Oscenses (R)	40	7	8	25	36	74	−38	29	
21	Jacetano (R)	40	7	7	26	47	84	−37	28	

(R) Relegated

Top scorer

46	D. Gómez	(Ejea)
34	Linares	(Barbastro)
27	Morales	(Villanueva)

Goalkeeper

0,6	18/30	Febles	(Barbastro)
0,91	32/35	Pedro Pérez	(Calatayud)
1	33/33	Dorronsoro	(Zaragoza B)

=== Group XVIII - Castilla-La Mancha ===
Pos	Team	Pld	W	D	L	GF	GA	GD	Pts	Qualification or relegation
1	Toledo	38	25	7	6	63	18	+45	82	Play-off
2	Villarrobledo	38	21	9	8	63	31	+32	72	Play-off
3	Almansa	38	18	14	6	63	31	+32	68	Play-off
4	Tomelloso	38	18	12	8	42	29	+13	66	Play-off
5	Manchego	38	17	13	8	51	31	+20	64	
6	Albacete B	38	16	14	8	52	27	+25	62	
7	Illescas	38	16	13	9	52	37	+15	61	
8	Hellín	38	15	13	10	49	37	+12	58	
9	Azuqueca	38	14	10	14	63	66	−3	52	
10	Gimn. Alcázar	38	14	10	14	37	41	−4	52	
11	La Roda	38	14	9	15	57	57	0	51	
12	Marchamalo	38	12	12	14	37	44	−7	48	
13	Unión Criptanense	38	11	13	14	41	49	−8	46	
14	Atl. Tarazona	38	11	13	14	33	47	−14	46	
15	Daimiel	38	10	11	17	49	51	−2	41	
16	Socuéllamos	38	11	6	21	30	55	−25	39	
17	Quintanar Rey (R)	38	7	15	16	30	44	−14	36	
18	Torrijos (R)	38	9	7	22	35	69	−34	34	
19	Miguelturreño (R)	38	7	9	22	38	71	−33	30	
20	Cobeja (R)	38	5	8	25	34	84	−50	23	

(R) Relegated

Top scorer

21	Robledo	(Azuquena)
18	Xabi Blas	(Villarrobledo)
18	Futre	(Villarrobledo)

Goalkeeper

0,5	15/30	Oliver	(Toledo)
0,76	29/38	Javi López	(Tomelloso)
0,81	31/38	Alvaro	(Villarrobledo)

== Promotion play-offs ==
=== Group Winners ===
Promoted to Segunda División B as group winners: Ciudad Santiago, Sporting B, Racing B, Barcelona Atlètic, Sant Andreu, Alzira, Valencia Mestalla, Navalcarnero, Roquetas, Antequera, San Fernando, Linense, Atlético Baleares, Santa Eulàlia, Las Palmas Atlético, Ciudad Lorquí, Sangonera Atl. and Real Murcia B.
