= Santa Comba CF =

Spanish football club

Santa Comba
- Full name: Santa Comba Club de Fútbol
- Founded: 1980 (as Atlético Mineiro)
- Dissolved: 2012
- Ground: A Fontenla, Santa Comba, Galicia, Spain
- Capacity: 3,000
- 2011–12: Preferente Autonómica – North, 4th of 20
Home colours	Away colours

Santa Comba Club de Fútbol was a football team based in Santa Comba in the autonomous community of Galicia. Founded in 1980, it merged with Xallas CF in June 2012 to form Xallas de Santa Comba CF. The club's played home games in A Fontenla, which has a capacity of 3,000 spectators.

== Season to season ==
Season	Tier	Division	Place	Copa del Rey
1980–81	7	2ª Reg.	8th	
1981–82	7	2ª Reg.	10th	
1982–83	7	2ª Reg.	7th	
1983–84	7	2ª Reg.	3rd	
1984–85	7	2ª Reg.	2nd	
1985–86	7	2ª Reg.	4th	
1986–87	6	1ª Reg.	8th	
1987–88	6	1ª Reg.	17th	
1988–89	7	2ª Reg.	8th	
1989–90	7	2ª Reg.	6th	
1990–91	7	2ª Reg.	10th	
1991–92	7	2ª Reg.	10th	
1992–93	7	2ª Reg.	11th	
1993–94	8	3ª Reg.	10th	
1994–95	8	3ª Reg.	4th	
1995–96	8	3ª Reg.	6th	

Season	Tier	Division	Place	Copa del Rey
1996–97	8	3ª Reg.	1st	
1997–98	7	2ª Reg.	2nd	
1998–99	7	2ª Reg.	1st	
1999–2000	6	1ª Reg.	4th	
2000–01	6	1ª Reg.	4th	
2001–02	6	1ª Reg.	14th	
2002–03	6	1ª Reg.	2nd	
2003–04	5	Reg. Pref.	5th	
2004–05	5	Reg. Pref.	1st	
2005–06	4	3ª	10th	
2006–07	4	3ª	7th	
2007–08	4	3ª	13th	
2008–09	4	3ª	9th	
2009–10	4	3ª	11th	
2010–11	4	3ª	17th	
2011–12	5	Pref. Aut.	4th	

- 6 seasons in Tercera División
