= 2006–07 Tercera División =

Tercera División
- Season: 2006–07

The 2006–07 Tercera División was the fourth tier of the football pyramid in Spain. Play started in August 2006 and ended in May 2007.

== Classification ==
Key to colors in league table:
Play-off for promotion
Direct relegation

=== Group I ===
Pos	Team	Pld	W	D	L	GF	GA	GD	Pts	Qualification or relegation
1	Deportivo Coruña B (P)	38	20	12	6	70	36	+34	72	Play-Off
2	Coruxo FC	38	20	12	6	61	34	+27	72	Play-Off
3	SD Negreira	38	20	8	10	55	34	+21	68	Play-Off
4	Villalonga FC	38	19	10	9	57	37	+20	67	Play-Off
5	SD Órdenes	38	19	9	10	63	51	+12	66	
6	CCD Cerceda	38	17	12	9	58	47	+11	63	
7	Santa Comba CF	38	18	9	11	56	46	+10	63	
8	Portonovo SD	38	15	13	10	48	39	+9	58	
9	Alondras CF	38	15	11	12	52	39	+13	56	
10	Narón BP	38	14	13	11	52	46	+6	55	
11	CD Ourense B	38	15	8	15	50	52	−2	53	
12	Rápido Bouzas	38	13	10	15	51	44	+7	49	
13	Céltiga FC	38	14	6	18	52	58	−6	48	
14	CD Lalín	38	10	8	20	48	79	−31	38	
15	Betanzos CF	38	8	13	17	43	52	−9	37	
16	Arosa SC	38	10	7	21	49	73	−24	37	
17	Club Lemos	38	9	10	19	38	64	−26	37	
18	Bergantiños CF (R)	38	9	9	20	35	53	−18	36	
19	Laracha CF (R)	38	6	13	19	24	50	−26	31	
20	Cruceiro do Hío CF (R)	38	6	13	19	47	75	−28	31	

(P) Promoted; (R) Relegated

=== Group II ===
Pos	Team	Pld	W	D	L	GF	GA	GD	Pts	Qualification or relegation
1	Caudal Deportivo	38	25	8	5	58	27	+31	83	Play-Off
2	CD Lealtad	38	24	8	6	70	34	+36	80	Play-Off
3	UP Langreo	38	21	11	6	61	30	+31	74	Play-Off
4	Sporting Gijón B	38	20	11	7	70	37	+33	71	Play-Off
5	CD Tuilla	38	20	11	7	61	42	+19	71	
6	Real Avilés Ind.	38	16	13	9	52	34	+18	61	
7	Ribadesella CF	38	16	11	11	57	39	+18	59	
8	CD Cudillero	38	11	16	11	50	41	+9	49	
9	UC Ceares	38	12	12	14	48	58	−10	48	
10	Club Siero	38	11	14	13	43	41	+2	47	
11	Condal Club	38	11	13	14	50	51	−1	46	
12	SD Navarro CF	38	10	12	16	32	40	−8	42	
13	CD Llanes	38	11	9	18	37	52	−15	42	
14	Astur CF	38	10	10	18	49	70	−21	40	
15	Club Hispano	38	10	10	18	41	64	−23	40	
16	CD Covadonga (R)	38	9	12	17	48	58	−10	39	
17	Gijón Industrial (R)	38	9	11	18	42	67	−25	38	
18	CD Praviano (R)	38	9	10	19	39	56	−17	37	
19	CD Mosconia (R)	38	8	11	19	44	65	−21	35	
20	CD San Martín (R)	38	8	5	25	41	87	−46	29	

(R) Relegated

=== Group III ===
Pos	Team	Pld	W	D	L	GF	GA	GD	Pts	Qualification or relegation
1	SD Noja	38	26	9	3	80	25	+55	87	Play-Off
2	UM Escobedo	38	22	12	4	79	22	+57	78	Play-Off
3	CD Tropezón	38	22	11	5	71	31	+40	77	Play-Off
4	CD Bezana	38	18	12	8	60	31	+29	66	Play-Off
5	CD Laredo	38	19	8	11	48	38	+10	65	
6	CF Ribamontán	38	16	10	12	40	37	+3	58	
7	Barreda Balompié	38	15	11	12	43	47	−4	56	
8	Castro FC	38	13	16	9	32	28	+4	55	
9	AD Trasmiera	38	14	9	15	45	44	+1	51	
10	Velarde CF	38	14	9	15	51	53	−2	51	
11	G. Torrelavega B (Note: Due to relegation to Gimnástica de Torrelavega to Tercera División, the reserve team, Gimnástica de Torrelavega B, was forced to relegate to Preferente.) (R)	38	13	10	15	33	35	−2	49	
12	Atlético Albericia	38	10	15	13	35	43	−8	45	
13	Santoña CF	38	10	14	14	38	46	−8	44	
14	SD Gama	38	11	10	17	35	57	−22	43	
15	CD Siete Villas	38	11	9	18	35	51	−16	42	
16	SD Reocín	38	10	9	19	27	40	−13	39	
17	Solares SD (R)	38	9	7	22	33	55	−22	34	
18	CD Cayón (R)	38	9	6	23	34	71	−37	33	
19	SD Textil Escudo (R)	38	7	11	20	30	60	−30	32	
20	Selaya FC (R)	38	7	10	21	26	61	−35	31	

(R) Relegated

=== Group IV ===
Pos	Team	Pld	W	D	L	GF	GA	GD	Pts	Qualification or relegation
1	Zalla UC	38	22	10	6	64	35	+29	76	Play-Off
2	SD Amorebieta	38	18	16	4	56	27	+29	70	Play-Off
3	Club Portugalete	38	21	7	10	60	36	+24	70	Play-Off
4	SD Beasaín	38	19	12	7	66	38	+28	69	Play-Off
5	CD Baskonia	38	19	11	8	62	38	+24	68	
6	SD Gernika Club	38	18	14	6	62	28	+34	68	
7	CD Santurtzi	38	13	17	8	37	25	+12	56	
8	Cultural Durango	38	14	13	11	46	41	+5	55	
9	SD Éibar B	38	12	15	11	43	33	+10	51	
10	Deportivo Alavés B	38	12	14	12	37	34	+3	50	
11	Arenas Club de Getxo	38	12	13	13	38	39	−1	49	
12	CD Elgóibar	38	12	11	15	33	41	−8	47	
13	CD Laudio-S.	38	12	10	16	35	47	−12	46	
14	CD Lagún Onak	38	10	12	16	36	42	−6	42	
15	SD San Pedro	38	10	10	18	29	47	−18	40	
16	Tolosa CF	38	9	10	19	35	58	−23	37	
17	Real Unión B (R)	38	10	7	21	38	68	−30	37	
18	Santutxu FC (R)	38	8	10	20	35	64	−29	34	
19	Universidad PV (R)	38	7	10	21	35	66	−31	31	
20	Club San Ignacio (R)	38	8	6	24	27	67	−40	30	

(R) Relegated

=== Group V ===
Pos	Team	Pld	W	D	L	GF	GA	GD	Pts	Qualification or relegation
1	CF Reus Deportiu	38	24	10	4	62	12	+50	82	Play-Off
2	Girona FC (P)	38	25	5	8	64	34	+30	80	Play-Off
3	CE Sabadell (P)	38	25	5	8	78	35	+43	80	Play-Off
4	CF Gavà (P)	38	20	12	6	69	41	+28	72	Play-Off
5	CF Vilanova	38	18	10	10	64	49	+15	64	
6	CE Mataró	38	17	11	10	54	46	+8	62	
7	FC Santboià	38	15	10	13	45	48	−3	55	
8	CF Balaguer	38	14	9	15	55	59	−4	51	
9	Palamós CF	38	13	12	13	41	41	0	51	
10	CE Manresa	38	12	10	16	32	50	−18	46	
11	UE Rapitenca	38	11	12	15	50	44	+6	45	
12	UE Castelldefels	38	12	9	17	44	59	−15	45	
13	Barcelona C (Note: Due to relegation to Barcelona B to Tercera División, FC Barcelona C was relegated to Primera Catalana and then dissolved.)	38	10	15	13	45	52	−7	45	
14	CE Europa	38	12	8	18	51	48	+3	44	
15	CD Blanes	38	11	10	17	50	57	−7	43	
16	CE Premià	38	11	10	17	40	58	−18	43	
17	CD Masnou	38	11	7	20	47	66	−19	40	
18	AE Prat (R)	38	11	7	20	42	62	−20	40	
19	CF Peralada (R)	38	8	9	21	43	69	−26	33	
20	CF Palafrugell (R)	38	7	5	26	29	75	−46	26	

(P) Promoted; (R) Relegated

=== Group VI ===
Pos	Team	Pld	W	D	L	GF	GA	GD	Pts	Qualification or relegation
1	CD Denia (P)	42	25	13	4	78	36	+42	88	Play-Off
2	Villarreal CF B (P)	42	24	11	7	77	28	+49	83	Play-Off
3	FC Torrevieja	42	22	15	5	66	34	+32	81	Play-Off
4	Ontinyent CF (P)	42	23	10	9	71	35	+36	79	Play-Off
5	Novelda CF	42	22	12	8	62	30	+32	78	
6	Burjassot CF	42	19	11	12	56	43	+13	68	
7	Catarroja CF	42	15	13	14	46	51	−5	58	
8	CD Onda	42	17	7	18	53	48	+5	58	
9	CD Castellón B	42	15	13	14	55	50	+5	58	
10	Pego CF	42	14	12	16	44	58	−14	54	
11	Crevillente Deportivo	42	12	16	14	45	52	−7	52	
12	UD Puzol	42	14	9	19	52	58	−6	51	
13	CD Alone de Guardamar	42	14	8	20	48	66	−18	50	
14	UD Horadada (R)	42	13	10	19	52	60	−8	49	
15	UD Alzira	42	12	12	18	41	59	−18	48	
16	FC Jove Español	42	12	12	18	45	66	−21	48	
17	Elche CF Ilicitano	42	12	12	18	44	50	−6	48	
18	CF Dolores (R)	42	12	11	19	39	47	−8	47	
19	SD Sueca (R)	42	11	13	18	34	55	−21	46	
20	Alicante CF B (R)	42	10	11	21	42	62	−20	41	
21	UD Oliva (R)	42	9	12	21	40	69	−29	39	
22	SC Requena (R)	42	7	13	22	35	68	−33	34	

(P) Promoted; (R) Relegated

=== Group VII ===
Pos	Team	Pld	W	D	L	GF	GA	GD	Pts	Qualification or relegation
1	RSD Alcalá	40	19	14	7	61	30	+31	71	Play-Off
2	Getafe CF B	40	20	7	13	52	37	+15	67	Play-Off
3	CD San Fernando de H.	40	16	18	6	40	29	+11	66	Play-Off
4	CD Ciempozuelos	40	18	12	10	64	43	+21	66	Play-Off
5	AD Parla	40	17	15	8	45	29	+16	66	
6	Real Madrid C	40	16	14	10	55	40	+15	62	
7	CDA Navalcarnero	40	16	13	11	60	55	+5	61	
8	Atlético Pinto	40	17	10	13	48	38	+10	61	
9	CD Móstoles	40	17	8	15	58	47	+11	59	
10	Rayo Majadahonda	40	14	16	10	43	32	+11	58	
11	CD Puerta Bonita	40	11	18	11	35	43	−8	51	
12	Collado Villalba	40	13	10	17	34	39	−5	49	
13	Rayo Vallecano B	40	13	10	17	40	43	−3	49	
14	Soto Alcobendas CF	40	13	9	18	48	63	−15	48	
15	CD Las Rozas	40	11	14	15	31	44	−13	47	
16	Atlético Madrid C	40	11	14	15	44	51	−7	47	
17	Tres Cantos Pegaso (R)	40	11	12	17	39	45	−6	45	
18	CD Coslada (R)	40	10	14	16	50	67	−17	44	
19	DAV Santa Ana (R)	40	10	12	18	44	58	−14	42	
20	CD Colonia Ofigevi (R)	40	8	14	18	32	51	−19	38	
21	AD Colmenar Viejo (R)	40	8	8	24	40	79	−39	32	

(R) Relegated

=== Group VIII ===
Pos	Team	Pld	W	D	L	GF	GA	GD	Pts	Qualification or relegation
1	CD Mirandés	38	24	12	2	63	26	+37	84	Play-Off
2	Gimnástica Segoviana	38	22	10	6	67	31	+36	76	Play-Off
3	CD Numancia B	38	20	13	5	55	30	+25	73	Play-Off
4	Real Ávila CF	38	21	9	8	54	30	+24	72	Play-Off
5	CD Huracán Z	38	18	13	7	49	37	+12	67	
6	Arandina CF	38	18	9	11	63	41	+22	63	
7	Norma San Leonardo	38	16	12	10	46	35	+11	60	
8	CA Bembibre	38	13	20	5	54	35	+19	59	
9	CD Becerril	38	16	10	12	46	45	+1	58	
10	Laguna	38	14	13	11	49	40	+9	55	
11	CD La Granja	38	14	8	16	39	43	−4	50	
12	UD Salamanca B	38	12	13	13	43	42	+1	49	
13	SD Ponferradina B	38	12	7	19	42	58	−16	43	
14	Burgos CF B	38	8	14	16	31	44	−13	38	
15	Cultural Leonesa B	38	7	17	14	35	49	−14	38	
16	CD Jher Íscar	38	8	12	18	36	55	−19	36	
17	SD Hullera Vasco-Leonesa	38	9	8	21	33	54	−21	35	
18	Universidad de Valladolid (R)	38	7	10	21	50	75	−25	31	
19	CD Benavente (R)	38	7	8	23	34	60	−26	29	
20	La Bañeza FC (R)	38	1	8	29	15	74	−59	11	

(R) Relegated

=== Group IX ===
Pos	Team	Pld	W	D	L	GF	GA	GD	Pts	Qualification or relegation
1	Granada Atlético CF	38	23	12	3	56	25	+31	81	Play-Off
2	CD Roquetas	38	24	7	7	62	31	+31	79	Play-Off
3	CP Ejido B	38	19	13	6	53	26	+27	70	Play-Off
4	Motril CF	38	21	4	13	69	39	+30	67	Play-Off
5	Arenas CyD	38	20	6	12	56	26	+30	66	
6	AD Adra	38	19	8	11	60	41	+19	65	
7	Vélez CF	38	15	15	8	54	45	+9	60	
8	Antequera CF	38	17	8	13	47	41	+6	59	
9	UD Fuengirola Los Boliches	38	16	7	15	47	43	+4	55	
10	CD Alhaurino	38	14	9	15	54	58	−4	51	
11	UD Almería B	38	12	13	13	37	50	−13	49	
12	CD Vera de Almería	38	10	16	12	50	49	+1	46	
13	AD Comarca de Níjar	38	13	6	19	39	52	−13	45	
14	Torredonjimeno CF	38	8	20	10	43	45	−2	44	
15	Alhaurín de la Torre CF	38	12	7	19	36	48	−12	43	
16	AD Huercalense	38	11	8	19	41	51	−10	41	
17	Loja CD	38	8	15	15	32	48	−16	39	
18	UD Carolinense (R)	38	8	11	19	36	56	−20	35	
19	CD Imperio Albolote (R)	38	6	8	24	27	64	−37	26	
20	UD Maracena (R)	38	6	3	29	22	83	−61	21	

(R) Relegated

=== Group X ===
Pos	Team	Pld	W	D	L	GF	GA	GD	Pts	Qualification or relegation
1	Algeciras CF (P)	38	24	7	7	63	29	+34	79	Play-Off
2	Real Betis B (P)	38	24	4	10	59	33	+26	76	Play-Off
3	Lucena CF (P)	38	19	11	8	51	30	+21	68	Play-Off
4	CD San Fernando	38	20	8	10	61	35	+26	68	Play-Off
5	RB Linense	38	17	16	5	55	32	+23	67	
6	UD Los Palacios	38	18	10	10	45	37	+8	64	
7	UD Los Barrios	38	17	10	11	62	44	+18	61	
8	Arcos CF	38	17	8	13	67	60	+7	59	
9	Cádiz CF B	38	16	7	15	46	43	+3	55	
10	CD Mairena	38	13	14	11	44	44	0	53	
11	Puerto Real CF	38	13	13	12	53	48	+5	52	
12	CD Pozoblanco	38	12	14	12	40	50	−10	50	
13	Córdoba CF B	38	12	9	17	37	47	−10	45	
14	Ayamonte CF	38	10	11	17	31	42	−11	41	
15	Jerez Industrial CF	38	8	14	16	35	56	−21	38	
16	Xerez CD B	38	9	10	19	41	58	−17	37	
17	Atl. Sanluqueño CF	38	9	9	20	36	53	−17	36	
18	Atlético Ceuta (R)	38	6	13	19	32	54	−22	31	
19	CD Cabecense (R)	38	7	8	23	32	66	−34	29	
20	Chiclana CF (R)	38	6	10	22	37	66	−29	28	

(P) Promoted; (R) Relegated

=== Group XI ===
Pos	Team	Pld	W	D	L	GF	GA	GD	Pts	Qualification or relegation
1	SE Eivissa (P)	38	24	8	6	76	30	+46	80	Play-Off
2	RCD Mallorca B	38	19	15	4	84	32	+52	72	Play-Off
3	UD Poblense	38	18	12	8	49	37	+12	66	Play-Off
4	CD Margaritense	38	19	9	10	61	39	+22	66	Play-Off
5	CD Binissalem	38	18	11	9	54	45	+9	65	
6	Atlético Baleares	38	18	11	9	66	44	+22	65	
7	CD Ferriolense	38	18	8	12	65	46	+19	62	
8	Santa Eulàlia	38	15	15	8	51	33	+18	60	
9	CD Manacor	38	16	8	14	47	50	−3	56	
10	CD Santanyí	38	14	13	11	55	40	+15	55	
11	UE Alcúdia	38	15	10	13	51	45	+6	55	
12	Atlètic de Ciutadella	38	12	15	11	39	40	−1	51	
13	CF Sporting Mahonés	38	11	14	13	36	46	−10	47	
14	CE Alaior	38	12	10	16	53	57	−4	46	
15	CD Constancia	38	7	15	16	53	71	−18	36	
16	CF Vilafranca (R)	38	8	11	19	33	55	−22	35	
17	CD Montuïri	38	9	8	21	42	62	−20	35	
18	UD Collerense (R)	38	9	7	22	47	89	−42	34	
19	CE Andratx (R)	38	7	10	21	32	66	−34	31	
20	CF Sóller (R)	38	4	4	30	27	94	−67	16	

(P) Promoted; (R) Relegated

=== Group XII ===
Pos	Team	Pld	W	D	L	GF	GA	GD	Pts	Qualification or relegation
1	UD Las Palmas B	40	21	12	7	72	40	+32	75	Play-Off
2	CD San Isidro (P)	40	20	11	9	57	40	+17	71	Play-Off
3	UD Villa de Santa Brígida (P)	40	18	17	5	62	28	+34	71	Play-Off
4	UD Fuerteventura (P)	40	19	12	9	48	26	+22	69	Play-Off
5	Castillo CF	40	16	17	7	56	36	+20	65	
6	AD Laguna	40	14	18	8	47	35	+12	60	
7	UD Tijarafe	40	17	9	14	55	44	+11	60	
8	UD Las Zocas	40	16	11	13	58	46	+12	59	
9	UD Gáldar	40	15	12	13	49	42	+7	57	
10	CD Tenerife B	40	14	12	14	57	49	+8	54	
11	CD Doramas (R)	40	14	10	16	53	52	+1	52	
12	Atlético Granadilla	40	14	10	16	57	53	+4	52	
13	CD Teguise	40	12	16	12	33	44	−11	52	
14	UD Tegueste	40	13	9	18	52	65	−13	48	
15	SD Tenisca	40	12	11	17	45	61	−16	47	
16	CF Unión Antigua	40	11	13	16	46	54	−8	46	
17	UD Ibarra Tenerife Sur	40	11	13	16	42	59	−17	46	
18	AD Huracán (R)	40	12	8	20	49	64	−15	44	
19	UD Realejos (R)	40	10	10	20	42	78	−36	40	
20	UD Teror Balompié (R)	40	8	11	21	36	70	−34	35	
21	CD Unión Sur Yaiza (R)	40	9	6	25	45	75	−30	33	

(P) Promoted; (R) Relegated

=== Group XIII ===
Pos	Team	Pld	W	D	L	GF	GA	GD	Pts	Qualification or relegation
1	Real Murcia B	38	28	5	5	80	26	+54	89	Play-Off
2	Mazarrón CF (P)	38	27	7	4	84	39	+45	88	Play-Off
3	Caravaca CF	38	22	13	3	82	26	+56	79	Play-Off
4	Sangonera Atlético	38	23	10	5	77	28	+49	79	Play-Off
5	AD Mar Menor (Note: At end of season 2006–07, AD Mar Menor-San Javier is dissolved due to economic problems.)	38	22	12	4	77	30	+47	78	
6	CD La Unión	38	15	12	11	45	37	+8	57	
7	Pinatar CF	38	15	9	14	53	50	+3	54	
8	Calasparra FC	38	13	14	11	45	37	+8	53	
9	Relesa Las Palas	38	13	11	14	49	43	+6	50	
10	Moratalla CF	38	12	13	13	55	59	−4	49	
11	Ciudad de Murcia B	38	10	15	13	39	49	−10	45	
12	Yeclano Deportivo	38	11	11	16	55	61	−6	44	
13	Olímpico Totana	38	8	19	11	42	44	−2	43	
14	EMD Lorquí	38	12	10	16	48	57	−9	46	
15	Imperial Promesas	38	11	9	18	43	52	−9	42	
16	Jumilla CF	38	8	12	18	37	69	−32	36	
17	CD Bala Azul	38	8	9	21	36	69	−33	33	
18	CD Molinense (R)	38	8	8	22	28	63	−35	32	
19	EF San Ginés (R)	38	6	9	23	24	82	−58	27	
20	CD Beniel (R)	38	2	4	32	25	103	−78	10	

(P) Promoted; (R) Relegated

=== Group XIV ===
Pos	Team	Pld	W	D	L	GF	GA	GD	Pts	Qualification or relegation
1	Jerez CF	38	23	13	2	47	16	+31	82	Play-Off
2	CD Don Benito	38	25	7	6	77	25	+52	82	Play-Off
3	Imperio de Mérida CP	38	25	6	7	67	28	+39	81	Play-Off
4	CP Cacereño	38	22	9	7	71	31	+40	75	Play-Off
5	CD Díter Zafra	38	19	16	3	57	21	+36	73	
6	Sporting Villanueva	38	19	10	9	60	24	+36	67	
7	CD Badajoz	38	17	7	14	50	34	+16	58	
8	CD Miajadas	38	16	9	13	62	64	−2	57	
9	CF Extremadura B (Note: Due to relegation of first team, CF Extremadura, the reserve team, CF Extremadura B, was forced to relegate to Preferente.) (R)	38	15	11	12	44	39	+5	56	
10	SP Villafranca	38	16	7	15	51	49	+2	55	
11	UC La Estrella	38	12	12	14	45	49	−4	48	
12	Moralo CP	38	13	8	17	42	43	−1	47	
13	UP Plasencia	38	13	6	19	48	44	+4	45	
14	CD Santa Amalia	38	11	10	17	46	58	−12	43	
15	CP Sanvicenteño	38	11	10	17	40	60	−20	43	
16	CP Olivenza	38	10	11	17	30	47	−17	41	
17	CD Coria (R)	38	9	11	18	46	63	−17	38	
18	CD Castuera (R)	38	7	7	24	30	67	−37	28	
19	CP Monesterio (R)	38	5	5	28	19	71	−52	20	
20	CD Moraleja (R)	38	3	3	32	38	137	−99	12	

(R) Relegated

=== Group XV ===
Pos	Team	Pld	W	D	L	GF	GA	GD	Pts	Qualification or relegation
1	CD Valle de Egüés	38	26	6	6	77	43	+34	84	Play-Off
2	Peña Sport FC (P)	38	24	10	4	72	25	+47	82	Play-Off
3	CDU Mutilvera	38	24	6	8	63	37	+26	78	Play-Off
4	CD Tudelano	38	22	8	8	64	40	+24	74	Play-Off
5	CD Izarra	38	17	11	10	57	46	+11	62	
6	CA Cirbonero	38	18	7	13	70	50	+20	61	
7	CD Huarte	38	13	16	9	51	41	+10	55	
8	CD Aluvión	38	14	12	12	50	51	−1	54	
9	UDC Chantrea	38	14	9	15	48	52	−4	51	
10	UCD Burladés	38	11	13	14	42	51	−9	46	
11	CD River Ega	38	12	10	16	49	53	−4	46	
12	CD Murchante	38	12	9	17	36	54	−18	45	
13	CD Iruña	38	13	5	20	56	60	−4	44	
14	CD Oberena	38	11	11	16	43	48	−5	44	
15	CD Aoiz	38	10	12	16	49	48	+1	42	
16	CF Ardoi	38	11	9	18	44	64	−20	42	
17	CD Lourdes	38	11	7	20	45	56	−11	40	
18	CM Peralta (R)	38	8	15	15	42	57	−15	39	
19	SD Lagunak (R)	38	8	12	18	30	50	−20	36	
20	CD Avance Ezcabarte (R)	38	4	6	28	30	92	−62	18	

(P) Promoted; (R) Relegated

=== Group XVI ===
Pos	Team	Pld	W	D	L	GF	GA	GD	Pts	Qualification or relegation
1	Haro Deportivo	38	30	4	4	100	15	+85	94	Play-Off
2	AD Fundación Logroñés	38	28	7	3	111	22	+89	91	Play-Off
3	CD Calahorra	38	26	7	5	90	29	+61	85	Play-Off
4	CD Anguiano	38	26	2	10	94	32	+62	80	Play-Off
5	SD Oyonesa	38	23	9	6	84	36	+48	78	
6	CD Varea	38	23	7	8	63	27	+36	76	
7	Náxara CD	38	19	6	13	46	37	+9	63	
8	CD Agoncillo	38	18	6	14	68	51	+17	60	
9	CD Arnedo	38	17	7	14	46	31	+15	58	
10	CA River Ebro	38	16	7	15	59	53	+6	55	
11	ACD San Marcial	38	12	13	13	53	53	0	49	
12	CF Ciudad Alfaro	38	13	7	18	54	65	−11	46	
13	CD Cenicero	38	10	7	21	35	70	−35	37	
14	Yagüe CF	38	9	10	19	37	69	−32	37	
15	CP Calasancio	38	9	9	20	24	63	−39	36	
16	CF Rapid Murillo	38	9	8	21	36	68	−32	35	
17	CD Autol (R)	38	8	9	21	31	89	−58	33	
18	CD Pradejón (R)	38	8	5	25	49	107	−58	29	
19	San Lorenzo CD (R)	38	5	4	29	29	99	−70	19	
20	CD Bañuelos (R)	38	2	4	32	29	122	−93	10	

(R) Relegated

=== Group XVII ===
Pos	Team	Pld	W	D	L	GF	GA	GD	Pts	Qualification or relegation
1	Real Zaragoza B	38	28	7	3	113	21	+92	91	Play-Off
2	Utebo FC	38	23	9	6	76	34	+42	78	Play-Off
3	Andorra CF	38	21	14	3	73	33	+40	77	Play-Off
4	Monzón	38	20	12	6	70	29	+41	72	Play-Off
5	SD Ejea	38	20	11	7	61	30	+31	71	
6	CD Teruel	38	16	15	7	69	29	+40	63	
7	CF Figueruelas	38	16	11	11	47	50	−3	59	
8	AD Sabiñánigo	38	14	10	14	41	49	−8	52	
9	At. Calatayud	38	14	9	15	45	49	−4	51	
10	Villanueva CF	38	13	11	14	51	52	−1	50	
11	CD Ebro	38	10	15	13	40	50	−10	45	
12	CD Sariñena	38	11	12	15	31	45	−14	45	
13	CD Binéfar	38	10	14	14	42	37	+5	44	
14	CF Jacetano	38	10	9	19	43	72	−29	39	
15	CD Illueca	38	11	5	22	37	55	−18	38	
16	CD Peñas Oscenses	38	9	11	18	36	69	−33	38	
17	Alcañiz CF (R)	38	10	7	21	38	76	−38	37	
18	CD Zuera (R)	38	7	12	19	42	72	−30	33	
19	CD Caspe (R)	38	9	6	23	33	86	−53	33	
20	UD Casetas (R)	38	6	4	28	30	80	−50	22	

(R) Relegated

=== Group XVIII ===
Pos	Team	Pld	W	D	L	GF	GA	GD	Pts	Qualification or relegation
1	UB Conquense (P)	38	28	8	2	74	21	+53	92	Play-Off
2	CD Guadalajara (P)	38	26	8	4	68	21	+47	86	Play-Off
3	CD Toledo	38	20	9	9	58	37	+21	69	Play-Off
4	UD Almansa	38	19	11	8	56	31	+25	68	Play-Off
5	La Roda CF	38	18	11	9	60	46	+14	65	
6	Tomelloso CF	38	17	10	11	37	31	+6	61	
7	Hellín Deportivo	38	14	14	10	51	43	+8	56	
8	Manchego CF	38	16	8	14	48	41	+7	56	
9	CD Illescas	38	14	12	12	39	39	0	54	
10	Atlético Tarazona	38	12	13	13	42	56	−14	49	
11	CD Marchamalo	38	13	9	16	49	59	−10	48	
12	Albacete B	38	12	10	16	40	43	−3	46	
13	G. Alcázar	38	11	12	15	37	44	−7	45	
14	CP Villarrobledo	38	10	13	15	43	42	+1	43	
15	CD Miguelturreño	38	10	12	16	43	53	−10	42	
16	CD Quintanar del Rey	38	9	14	15	28	40	−12	41	
17	UD Socuéllamos	38	11	8	19	46	59	−13	41	
18	CF La Solana (R)	38	7	10	21	30	65	−35	31	
19	AD Torpedo 66 (R)	38	6	13	19	30	52	−22	31	
20	UD Talavera (R)	38	1	7	30	18	74	−56	10	

(P) Promoted; (R) Relegated
