= CD Teguise =

Spanish football team

Teguise
- Full name: Club Deportivo Teguise
- Founded: 1949
- Ground: Los Molinos, Teguise, Canary Islands, Spain
- Capacity: 1,500
- Chairman: (Spain) Orlando Cáceres
- Manager: (Spain) Rafael Rodríguez
- League: Primera Aficionados Lanzarote
- 2024–25: Primera Aficionados Lanzarote, 11th of 15
Home colours	Away colours

Club Deportivo Teguise is a football team based in Teguise, in the Canary Islands. Founded in 1949, it plays in the Primera Aficionados Lanzarote. Its stadium is Los Molinos with a capacity of 1,500 seats.

== Season to season ==
Season	Tier	Division	Place	Copa del Rey
1949–1970	—	Regional	—	
1970–71	5	2ª Reg.	6th	
1971–72	5	2ª Reg.	6th	
1972–73	DNP			
1973–74	DNP			
1974–75	DNP			
1975–76	6	3ª Reg.		
1976–77	6	3ª Reg.		
1977–78	8	3ª Reg.		
1978–79	8	3ª Reg.		
1979–80	8	3ª Reg.		
1980–81	8	3ª Reg.		
1981–82	8	3ª Reg.	1st	
1982–83	8	3ª Reg.	1st	
1983–84	7	2ª Reg.	5th	
1984–85	7	2ª Reg.	7th	
1985–86	6	1ª Reg.	4th	
1986–87	6	1ª Reg.		
1987–88	6	1ª Reg.		
1988–89	6	1ª Reg.		

Season	Tier	Division	Place	Copa del Rey
1989–90	6	1ª Reg.		
1990–91	6	1ª Reg.	1st	
1991–92	5	Int. Pref.	2nd	
1992–93	5	Int. Pref.	12th	
1993–94	5	Int. Pref.	7th	
1994–95	5	Int. Pref.	17th	
1995–96	6	1ª Reg.	4th	
1996–97	6	1ª Reg.	4th	
1997–98	5	Int. Pref.	9th	
1998–99	5	Int. Pref.	11th	
1999–2000	5	Int. Pref.	13th	
2000–01	5	Int. Pref.	14th	
2001–02	5	Int. Pref.	2nd	
2002–03	4	3ª	15th	
2003–04	4	3ª	10th	
2004–05	4	3ª	17th	
2005–06	4	3ª	9th	
2006–07	4	3ª	13th	
2007–08	4	3ª	7th	
2008–09	4	3ª	20th	

Season	Tier	Division	Place	Copa del Rey
2009–10	5	Int. Pref.	10th	
2010–11	5	Int. Pref.	14th	
2011–12	5	Int. Pref.	17th	
2012–13	6	1ª Reg.	6th	
2013–14	6	1ª Afic.	7th	
2014–15	6	1ª Afic.	6th	
2015–16	6	1ª Afic.	2nd	
2016–17	5	Int. Pref.	18th	
2017–18	6	1ª Afic.	5th	
2018–19	6	1ª Afic.	5th	
2019–20	6	1ª Afic.	6th	
2020–21	6	1ª Afic.	10th	
2021–22	7	1ª Afic.	9th	
2022–23	7	1ª Afic.	8th	
2023–24	7	1ª Afic.	10th	
2024–25	7	1ª Afic.	11th	
2025–26	7	1ª Afic.		

- 7 seasons in Tercera División
