= Riojan Football Federation =

- Abbreviation: FRF
- Formation: 1986
- Headquarters: Logroño
- Location: La Rioja, Spain
- President: Gustavo Sáenz Lapedriza
- Website: www.frfutbol.com

The Riojan Football Federation (Spanish: Federación Riojana de Fútbol; FRF) is the football association responsible for all competitions of any form of football developed in La Rioja. It is integrated into the Royal Spanish Football Federation and its headquarters are located in Logroño.

== Competitions ==
- Men's
  - Tercera Federación (Group 16)
  - Regional Preferente (1 group)
- Youth
  - Liga Nacional Juvenil Group V
  - Divisiones Regionales
- Women's
  - Divisiones Regionales

== See also ==
- List of Spanish regional football federations
