= Peña Balsamaiso CF =

Spanish football club

Peña Balsamaiso
- Full name: Peña Balsamaiso Club de Fútbol
- Founded: 21 September 1952; 74 years ago
- Ground: La Estrella, Logroño, La Rioja, Spain
- Capacity: 500
- President: Jorge Aguado Mendaza
- Manager: Diego Estecha
- League: Regional Preferente
- 2025–26: Tercera Federación – Group 16, 18th of 18 (relegated)
- Website: https://www.balsamaiso.es/
Home colours	Away colours

Peña Balsamaiso Club de Fútbol is a Spanish football team based in Logroño, in the autonomous community of La Rioja. Founded in 1952, they play in Regional Preferente, holding home matches at Campo de Fútbol Municipal La Estrella, with a capacity of 500 people.

== History ==
Founded on 21 September 1952, Peña Balsamaiso started a senior side in 1957. The club first reached the Tercera División in 1994, but only lasted one season in the category.

Peña ceased activities in 2004, only returning in 2012 and achieving immediate promotion to the fourth division. After suffering relegation in 2016, the club again ceased activities one year later, before returning in 2019.

On 31 May 2021, Peña Balsamaiso signed an affiliation agreement with SD Logroñés, becoming their reserve team. They reached promotion to Tercera Federación at the end of that season, but the agreement ended in May 2024.

== Season to season ==
Season	Tier	Division	Place	Copa del Rey
1957–58	5	2ª Reg.	1st	
1958–59	5	2ª Reg.	3rd	
1959–60	5	2ª Reg.	4th	
1960–61	5	2ª Reg.	2nd	
1961–62	4	1ª Reg.	8th	
1962–63	4	1ª Reg.	8th	
1963–64	4	1ª Reg.	9th	
1964–65	4	1ª Reg.	10th	
1965–66	4	1ª Reg.	7th	
1966–67	4	1ª Reg.	5th	
1967–68	4	1ª Reg.	3rd	
1968–69	4	1ª Reg.	10th	
1969–70	4	1ª Reg.	14th	
1970–71	4	1ª Reg.	12th	
1971–72	4	1ª Reg.	18th	
1972–73	5	2ª Reg.	3rd	
1973–74	5	2ª Reg.	7th	
1974–75	5	1ª Reg.	3rd	
1975–76	5	1ª Reg.	11th	
1976–77	5	1ª Reg.	15th	

Season	Tier	Division	Place	Copa del Rey
1977–78	7	2ª Reg.	2nd	
1978–79	5	1ª Reg.	15th	
1979–80	7	2ª Reg.	5th	
1980–81	7	2ª Reg.	3rd	
1981–82	5	1ª Reg.	8th	
1982–83	5	1ª Reg.	16th	
1983–84	7	2ª Reg.	1st	
1984–85	5	1ª Reg.	2nd	
1985–86	5	1ª Reg.	8th	
1986–87	5	Reg. Pref.	9th	
1987–88	5	Reg. Pref.	8th	
1988–89	5	Reg. Pref.	7th	
1989–90	5	Reg. Pref.	9th	
1990–91	5	Reg. Pref.	3rd	
1991–92	5	Reg. Pref.	4th	
1992–93	5	Reg. Pref.	5th	
1993–94	5	Reg. Pref.	2nd	
1994–95	4	3ª	20th	
1995–96	5	Reg. Pref.	11th	
1996–97	5	Reg. Pref.	15th	

Season	Tier	Division	Place	Copa del Rey
1997–98	5	Reg. Pref.	8th	
1998–99	5	Reg. Pref.	6th	
1999–2000	5	Reg. Pref.	2nd	
2000–01	5	Reg. Pref.	4th	
2001–02	5	Reg. Pref.	3rd	
2002–03	5	Reg. Pref.	12th	
2003–04	5	Reg. Pref.	15th	
2004–2012	DNP			
2012–13	5	Reg. Pref.	4th	
2013–14	4	3ª	13th	
2014–15	4	3ª	13th	
2015–16	4	3ª	19th	
2016–17	5	Reg. Pref.	7th	
2017–18	DNP			
2018–19	DNP			
2019–20	5	Reg. Pref.	13th	
2020–21	5	Reg. Pref.	6th	
2021–22	6	Reg. Pref.	1st	N/A (Note: Reserve team of SD Logroñés.)
2022–23	5	3ª Fed.	7th	N/A
2023–24	5	3ª Fed.	11th	N/A

Season	Tier	Division	Place	Copa del Rey
2024–25	5	3ª Fed.	8th	
2025–26	5	3ª Fed.		

- 4 seasons in Tercera División
- 4 seasons in Tercera Federación
