= Aldeanueva de Ebro =

- Municipality
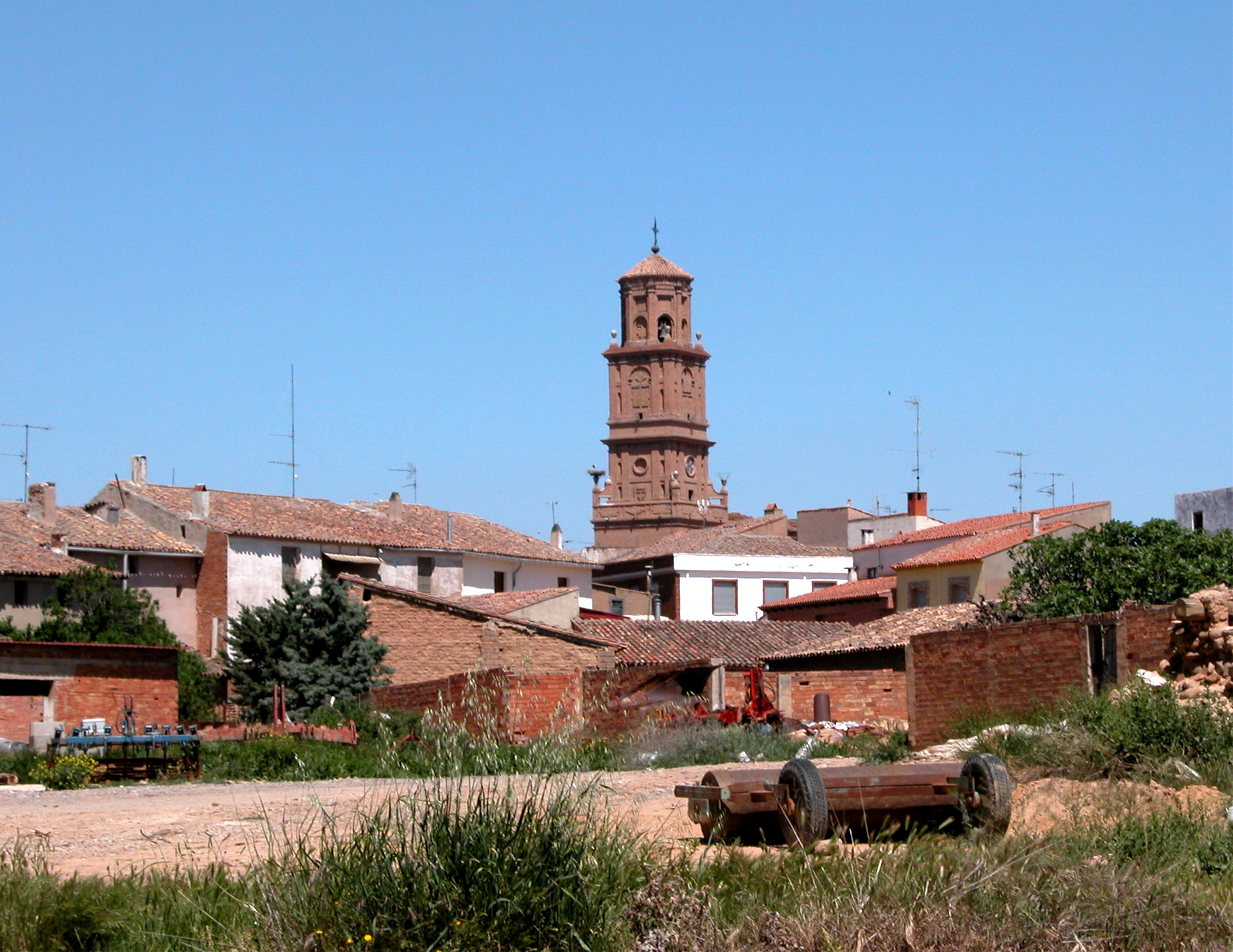

- Coat of arms

- Location within La Rioja, Spain Location within Spain
- Coordinates: 42°13′47″N 1°53′16″W
- Country: Spain
- Autonomous community: La Rioja
- Comarca: Alfaro

Area
  - Total: 39.08 km^{2} (15.09 sq mi)

Population (2025-01-01)
  - Total: 2,753
  - Density: 70.45/km^{2} (182.5/sq mi)
- Time zone: UTC+1 (CET)
  - Summer (DST): UTC+2 (CET)
- Website: www.aldeanuevadeebro.org
- 59 km to Logroño, 10 km to Calahorra

Aldeanueva de Ebro is a town in La Rioja, in the Alfaro Comarca, located 10 kilometers from Calahorra and 59 from Logroño, in Spain. It has 2,774 inhabitants and is 39 km² in area.

Its origin dates from the 11th century, when it was founded by shepherds from Tierra de Cameros and Calahorra after its reconquest by García Sánchez III of Navarre in 1045. It was part of the town of Calahorra until it became independent in 1664, under the reign of Philip IV by means of a considerable sum of money lent by the friars of Fitero, whose monastery maintained bonds. After many lawsuits, what was from then called Arnedo de Ebro passed into the hands of Manuel Íñiguez de Arnedo.

== Demography ==
- Population change in Aldeanueva de Ebro during the 20th century.

== Curiosities ==
The town is popularly known as the town of three lies, because "It's not a town, it's not new, and the Ebro doesn't pass by (though the river does pass by the north of the town). The residents of the town add more lies to this curiosity, for example: "Calle del Sol [Sun Street] gives shade." And "lalala calle [lalala street] is owned by JKL."
