= Cenicero =

- Municipality
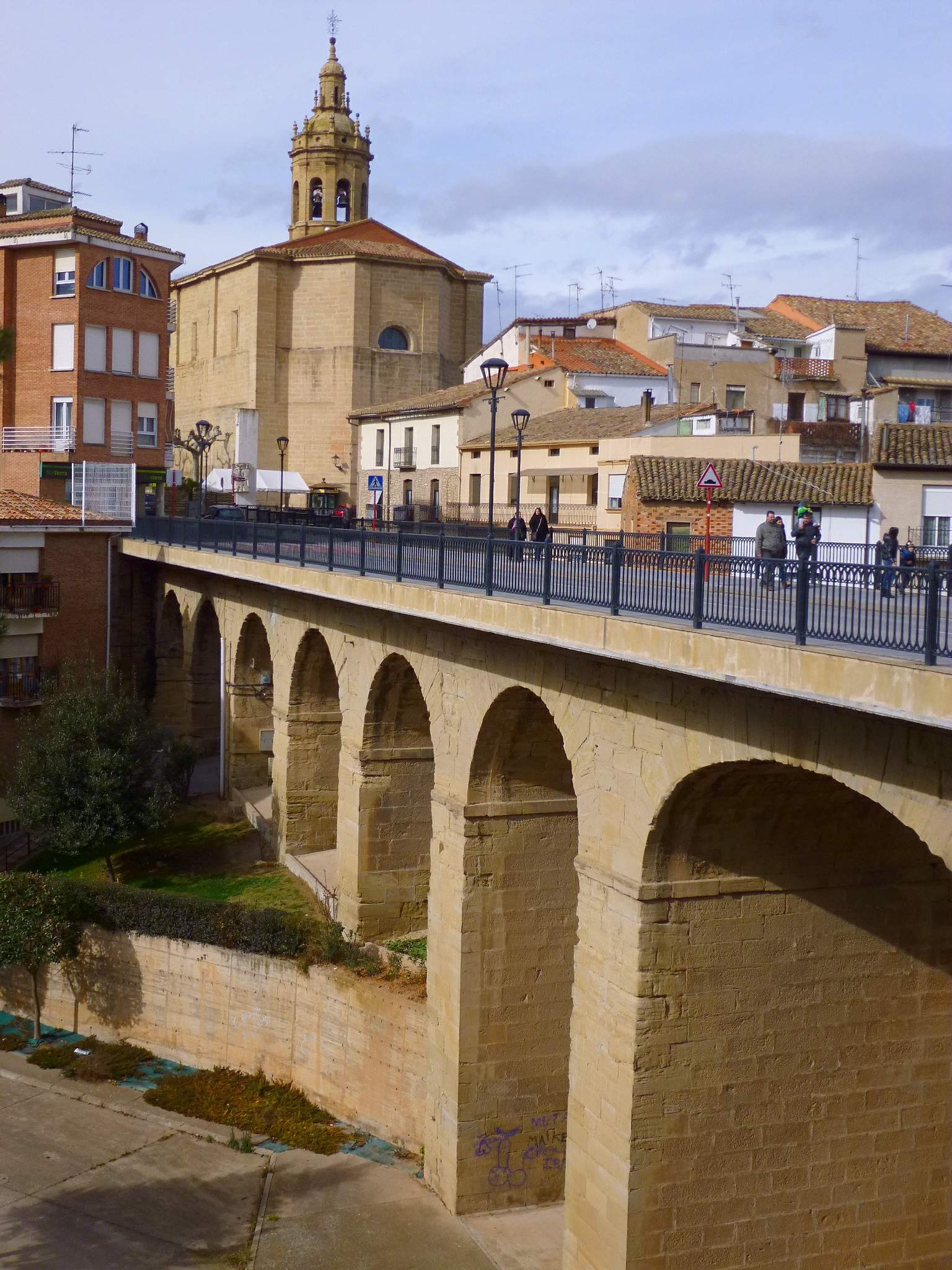

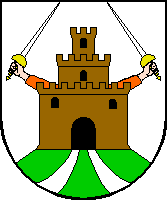
- Coat of arms

- Location in Spain Cenicero (Spain)
- Coordinates: 42°29′N 2°38′W
- Country: Spain
- Autonomous community: La Rioja
- Province: La Rioja
- Comarca: Comarca de Logroño

Government
  - Mayor: Pedro María Frías Zaldívar

Area
  - Total: 31.76 km^{2} (12.26 sq mi)
- Elevation: 436 m (1,430 ft)

Population (2025-01-01)
  - Total: 2,173
  - Density: 68.42/km^{2} (177.2/sq mi)
- Time zone: UTC+1 (CET)
  - Summer (DST): UTC+2 (CEST)
- Postal code: 62350
- Website: Official website

Cenicero is a municipality in the autonomous community of La Rioja in Spain.

The municipality is the home of Bodegas Riojanas one of the oldest Rioja Houses, formed in 1890, situated next to the River Ebro, a 5th-generation family company, where Vina Albina Reserva is the second-best-selling Reserva in Spain. It is also the home of Marques De Caceres, United Wineries Bodegas Laguardia, Bodegas Murillo Viteri, and Pascali Vermouth from Pascal Valentin.
