= Divisiones Regionales de Fútbol in La Rioja =

Divisiones Regionales de Fútbol in La Rioja, includes only the Regional Preferente. Previously, five seasons were played in a division below the *Regional Preferente*—the *Primera Regional*—with the 1990–91 season being the last.

== League chronology ==
Timeline

- Included in Navarre until 1986

== Regional Preferente ==
Regional Preferente
- Founded: 1986
- Country: Spain
- Number of clubs: 17
- Level on pyramid: 6
- Promotion to: 3ª Federación – Group 16
- Domestic cup: None
- Website: Official website

Regional Preferente is the fifth category of football in La Rioja. It is organized by the Federación Riojana de Fútbol.

Regional Preferente consist in 17 teams. At the end of the season, the top three teams are promoted. There are no relegations.

=== 2019–20 season teams ===
2019–20 Regional Preferente teams

Teams
- CD Agoncillo
- CD Aldeano
- CD Alfaro B
- CD Autol
- CD Bañuelos
- CD Cenicero
- CD Haro B
- CD Pradejón B
- CD San Lorenzo
- CD San Marcial
- CD Tedeón
- CD Varea B
- CF Rápid
- CP Calasancio B
- Peña Balsamasio CF
- Racing Rioja CF
- CA River Ebro Promesas

=== Champions ===
Season	Winner
2009–10	SD Logroñés
2010–11	Tedeón
2011–12	CD Villegas
2012–13	CF Ciudad de Alfaro
2013–14	Casalarreina CF
2014–15	CD Pradejón
2015–16	CF Rápid
2016–17	CD Pradejón
2017–18	CD Autol
2018–19	CD Calahorra B
2019-20	Racing Rioja CF
2020-21	CA River Ebro Promesas
2021-22	Peña Balsamaiso CF
2022-23	CD Tedeón
2023-24	CD Cenicero (group 1) Yagüe CF (group 2) ACD San Marcial (group 3)
2024-25	CD Pradejón
2025-26	CP Calasancio

== Primera regional (formerly) ==
Primera Regional
- Country: Spain
- Level on pyramid: 6
- Promotion to: Regional Preferente

From the 1986–87 season to the 1990–91 season, it functioned as a tier below the *Regional Preferente* of La Rioja, occupying the sixth level in the league system. Their seasons were organized by the Federación Riojana de Fútbol.

=== Champions ===
Throughout its existence, it was contested as a single group.

Season	Winner	Teams on the league
1986–87	CD San Mateo	15
1987–88	CA Vianés	11
1988–89	CD Cenicero	10
1989–90	CD Agoncillo	10
1990–91	CD Quel	9
