= Antxón Jaso =

Spanish footballer

Personal information
- Full name: Antxón Jaso Zunzarren
- Date of birth: 23 September 1997 (age 29)
- Place of birth: Agoitz, Spain
- Height: 1.87 m (6 ft 2 in)
- Position: Centre back

Team information
- Current team: Murcia
- Number: 5

Youth career
- Aoiz

Senior career*
Years	Team	Apps	(Gls)
2016–2017	Aoiz		
2017–2018	Mutilvera	31	(1)
2018–2019	Burgos	17	(0)
2019–2022	Bilbao Athletic	37	(2)
2019–2020	→ Amorebieta (loan)	21	(1)
2022–2023	Real Unión	12	(0)
2023	Amorebieta	8	(0)
2023–2024	Othellos Athienou	12	(0)
2024	Sestao River	18	(0)
2024–	Murcia	27	(0)
- * Club domestic league appearances and goals as of 10 June 2026

Antxón Jaso Zunzarren (born 23 September 1997) is a Spanish footballer who plays as a central defender for Murcia.

== Club career ==
Born in Agoitz, Navarre, Jaso was a product of CD Aoiz's youth setup. After making his first team debut for the side in 2016, in the Primera Autonómica de Navarra, he moved to Tercera División side UD Mutilvera in the following year.

On 15 June 2018, Jaso joined Burgos in Segunda División B. After featuring sparingly, he signed for Bilbao Athletic on 1 July 2019, but was loaned to fellow third division side SD Amorebieta on 12 August.

Back to the Lions for the 2020–21 season, Jaso renewed his contract with the club for a further year on 13 May 2021. He left Athletic on 8 June 2022, and signed a one-year deal with Real Unión on 13 July.

Jaso terminated his contract with the Txuri-beltz on 31 January 2023, and returned to Amorebieta just hours later. He featured in eight league matches for the latter during the remainder of the campaign, as the club returned to Segunda División at first attempt.

Jaso moved abroad for the first time in his career on 13 July 2023, after signing for Cypriot First Division side Othellos Athienou FC. He made his professional debut on 19 August, starting in a 1–1 away draw against Apollon Limassol FC.

Despite being a regular starter for Othellos, Jaso returned to Spain and its third level on 13 January 2024, joining Sestao River Club.

On 27 June 2024, Jaso signed with Murcia in the third tier.

== Honours ==
Amorebieta

- Primera Federación: 2022–23
