= CD Zarramonza =

Spanish football team

Zarramonza
- Full name: Club Deportivo Zarramonza
- Founded: 1966
- Ground: Santa Cruz, Arróniz, Navarre, Spain
- Capacity: 1,200
- Chairman: (Spain) Antonio Iturralde
- Manager: (Spain) Miguel Ángel Cambra
- League: Regional Preferente – Group 2
- 2024–25: Regional Preferente – Group 2, 6th of 16
Home colours

Club Deportivo Zarramonza is a Spanish football team based in Arróniz in the autonomous community of Navarre. Founded in 1966, it plays in Regional Preferente – Group 2. Its stadium is Campo de Fútbol Santa Cruz with a capacity of 1,200 seaters.

== Season to season ==
Season	Tier	Division	Place	Copa del Rey
1967–68	5	2ª Reg.	10th	
1968–69	5	2ª Reg.	11th	
1969–70	5	2ª Reg.	6th	
1970–71	5	2ª Reg.	10th	
1971–72	5	2ª Reg.	12th	
1972–73	5	2ª Reg.	5th	
1973–74	5	2ª Reg.	2nd	
1974–75	5	1ª Reg.	12th	
1975–76	5	1ª Reg.	12th	
1976–77	5	1ª Reg.	8th	
1977–78	6	1ª Reg.	2nd	
1978–79	5	Reg. Pref.	14th	
1979–80	5	Reg. Pref.	18th	
1980–81	5	Reg. Pref.	15th	
1981–82	5	Reg. Pref.	11th	
1982–83	5	Reg. Pref.	8th	
1983–84	5	Reg. Pref.	14th	
1984–85	5	Reg. Pref.	16th	
1985–86	5	Reg. Pref.	17th	
1986–87	5	Reg. Pref.	13th	

Season	Tier	Division	Place	Copa del Rey
1987–88	5	Reg. Pref.	6th	
1988–89	5	Reg. Pref.	15th	
1989–90	5	Reg. Pref.	13th	
1990–91	5	Reg. Pref.	15th	
1991–92	5	Reg. Pref.	17th	
1992–93	5	Reg. Pref.	20th	
1993–94	6	1ª Reg.	10th	
1994–95	6	1ª Reg.	4th	
1995–96	6	1ª Reg.	4th	
1996–97	6	1ª Reg.	2nd	
1997–98	5	Reg. Pref.	12th	
1998–99	5	Reg. Pref.	12th	
1999–2000	5	Reg. Pref.	17th	
2000–01	6	1ª Reg.	7th	
2001–02	6	1ª Reg.	3rd	
2002–03	6	1ª Reg.	2nd	
2003–04	5	Reg. Pref.	16th	
2004–05	5	Reg. Pref.	7th	
2005–06	5	Reg. Pref.	4th	
2006–07	5	Reg. Pref.	1st	

Season	Tier	Division	Place	Copa del Rey
2007–08	4	3ª	19th	
2008–09	5	Reg. Pref.	1st	
2009–10	4	3ª	19th	
2010–11	5	Reg. Pref.	7th	
2011–12	5	Reg. Pref.	9th	
2012–13	5	Reg. Pref.	11th	
2013–14	5	Reg. Pref.	13th	
2014–15	5	Reg. Pref.	14th	
2015–16	6	Reg. Pref.	4th	
2016–17	6	Reg. Pref.	7th	
2017–18	6	Reg. Pref.	4th	
2018–19	6	Reg. Pref.	2nd	
2019–20	5	1ª Aut.	18th	
2020–21	5	1ª Aut.	6th	
2021–22	6	1ª Aut.	5th	
2022–23	6	1ª Aut.	6th	
2023–24	7	Reg. Pref.	3rd	
2024–25	7	Reg. Pref.	6th	
2025–26	7	Reg. Pref.		

- 2 seasons in Tercera División
