= CD Idoya =

Spanish football team

Idoya
- Full name: Club Deportiva Idoya
- Founded: 1949
- Ground: Iturtxipia, Oteiza, Navarre, Spain
- Capacity: 1,000
- Chairman: (Spain) Tirso Guembe Landa
- Manager: (Spain) Miguel Ángel Cambra
- League: Regional Preferente – Group 2
- 2024–25: Regional Preferente – Group 1, 7th of 16
Home colours	Away colours

Club Deportivo Idoya is a Spanish football team based in Oteiza in the autonomous community of Navarre. Founded in 1949, it plays in Regional Preferente – Group 2. Its stadium is Estadio Iturtxipia with a capacity of 1,000 seaters.

== Season to season ==
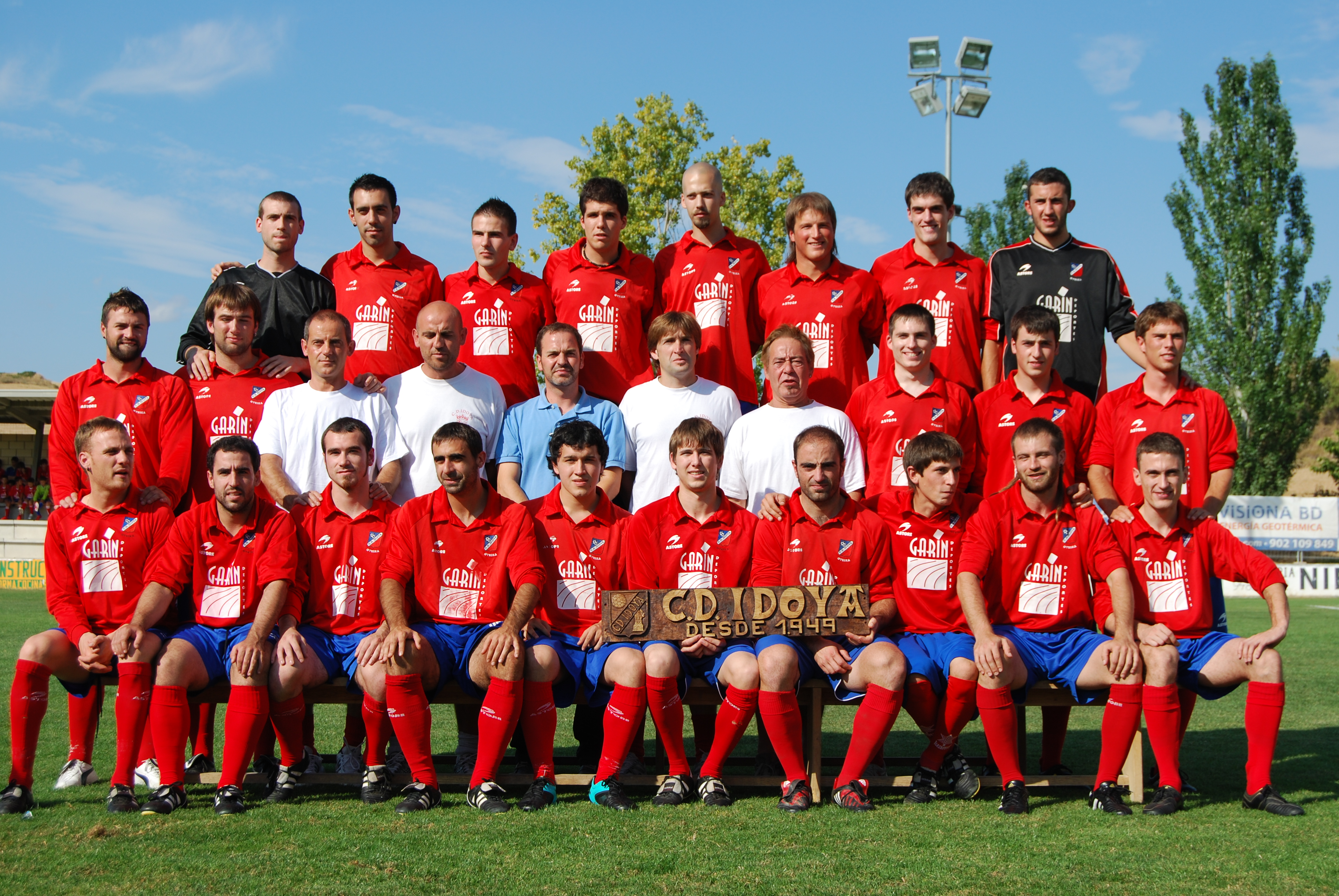
Idoya squad in the 2010–11 season

Season	Tier	Division	Place	Copa del Rey
1967–68	5	2ª Reg.	9th	
1968–69	5	2ª Reg.	7th	
1969–70	5	2ª Reg.	10th	
1970–71	6	3ª Reg.	8th	
1971–72	6	3ª Reg.	1st	
1972–73	5	2ª Reg.	10th	
1973–74	5	2ª Reg.	8th	
1974–75	5	1ª Reg.	13th	
1975–76	6	2ª Reg.	7th	
1976–77	6	2ª Reg.	6th	
1977–78	7	2ª Reg.	4th	
1978–79	7	2ª Reg.	4th	
1979–80	7	2ª Reg.	4th	
1980–81	7	2ª Reg.	3rd	
1981–82	6	1ª Reg.	12th	
1982–83	6	1ª Reg.	14th	
1983–84	6	1ª Reg.	13th	
1984–85	6	1ª Reg.	11th	
1985–86	6	1ª Reg.	8th	
1986–87	6	1ª Reg.	2nd	

Season	Tier	Division	Place	Copa del Rey
1987–88	6	1ª Reg.	1st	
1988–89	5	Reg. Pref.	11th	
1989–90	5	Reg. Pref.	8th	
1990–91	5	Reg. Pref.	12th	
1991–92	5	Reg. Pref.	16th	
1992–93	5	Reg. Pref.	16th	
1993–94	5	Reg. Pref.	4th	
1994–95	5	Reg. Pref.	3rd	
1995–96	5	Reg. Pref.	2nd	
1996–97	5	Reg. Pref.	3rd	
1997–98	5	Reg. Pref.	2nd	
1998–99	5	Reg. Pref.	1st	
1999–2000	4	3ª	15th	
2000–01	4	3ª	17th	
2001–02	4	3ª	19th	
2002–03	5	Reg. Pref.	19th	
2003–04	6	1ª Reg.	2nd	
2004–05	5	Reg. Pref.	3rd	
2005–06	5	Reg. Pref.	3rd	
2006–07	5	Reg. Pref.	3rd	

Season	Tier	Division	Place	Copa del Rey
2007–08	4	3ª	17th	
2008–09	4	3ª	18th	
2009–10	5	Reg. Pref.	1st	
2010–11	4	3ª	16th	
2011–12	4	3ª	14th	
2012–13	4	3ª	16th	
2013–14	5	Reg. Pref.	1st	
2014–15	4	3ª	18th	
2015–16	5	1ª Aut.	2nd	
2016–17	4	3ª	8th	
2017–18	4	3ª	18th	
2018–19	5	1ª Aut.	12th	
2019–20	5	1ª Aut.	17th	
2020–21	5	1ª Aut.	2nd	
2021–22	6	1ª Aut.	4th	
2022–23	6	1ª Aut.	5th	
2023–24	6	1ª Aut.	13th	
2024–25	7	Reg. Pref.	7th	
2025–26	7	Reg. Pref.		

- 8 seasons in Tercera División
