= CD Ilumberri =

Association football club in Spain

Ilumberri
- Full name: Club Deportivo Ilumberri
- Founded: 22 November 1923; 102 years ago
- Ground: El Lardín, Lumbier, Navarre, Spain
- Capacity: 1,000
- President: Ernesto García Aristu
- Manager: Julen Labiano
- League: Primera Autonómica
- 2024–25: Primera Autonómica, 9th of 18
- Website: cdilumberri.es
Home colours	Away colours

Club Deportivo Ilumberri is a Spanish football team based in Lumbier, in the autonomous community of Navarre. Founded in 1923, they play in Primera Autonómica, holding home matches in the Estadio Municipal El Lardín, with a capacity of 1,000 people.

== History ==
Founded on 22 November 1923 in the pharmacy Don Tirso Seriola, Ilumberri played local tournaments until the Spanish Civil War, and remained inactive until the 1960s.

In 2002, Ilumberri achieved a first-ever promotion to Tercera División, but only remained in the category for one season before being relegated back.

== Season to season ==
Season	Tier	Division	Place	Copa del Rey
1968–69	5	2ª Reg.	12th	
1969–70	5	2ª Reg.	5th	
1970–71	5	2ª Reg.	6th	
1971–72	5	2ª Reg.	10th	
1972–73	5	2ª Reg.	3rd	
1973–74	4	1ª Reg.	20th	
1974–75	5	1ª Reg.	2nd	
1975–76	4	Reg. Pref.	19th	
1976–77	5	1ª Reg.	1st	
1977–78	5	Reg. Pref.	10th	
1978–79	5	Reg. Pref.	18th	
1979–80	6	1ª Reg.	5th	
1980–81	6	1ª Reg.	14th	
1981–82	7	2ª Reg.	6th	
1982–83	7	2ª Reg.	2nd	
1983–84	6	1ª Reg.	6th	
1984–85	6	1ª Reg.	9th	
1985–86	6	1ª Reg.	12th	
1986–87	6	1ª Reg.	3rd	
1987–88	6	1ª Reg.	5th	

Season	Tier	Division	Place	Copa del Rey
1988–89	6	1ª Reg.	2nd	
1989–90	5	Reg. Pref.	5th	
1990–91	5	Reg. Pref.	10th	
1991–92	5	Reg. Pref.	14th	
1992–93	5	Reg. Pref.	14th	
1993–94	6	1ª Reg.	2nd	
1994–95	6	1ª Reg.	10th	
1995–96	6	1ª Reg.	5th	
1996–97	6	1ª Reg.	5th	
1997–98	6	1ª Reg.	2nd	
1998–99	5	Reg. Pref.	6th	
1999–2000	5	Reg. Pref.	13th	
2000–01	5	Reg. Pref.	14th	
2001–02	5	Reg. Pref.	3rd	
2002–03	4	3ª	21st	
2003–04	5	Reg. Pref.	18th	
2004–05	5	Reg. Pref.	15th	
2005–06	6	1ª Reg.	5th	
2006–07	6	1ª Reg.	3rd	
2007–08	5	Reg. Pref.	15th	

Season	Tier	Division	Place	Copa del Rey
2008–09	6	1ª Reg.	2nd	
2009–10	6	1ª Reg.	2nd	
2010–11	6	1ª Reg.	3rd	
2011–12	6	1ª Reg.	5th	
2012–13	6	1ª Reg.	1st	
2013–14	5	Reg. Pref.	11th	
2014–15	5	Reg. Pref.	4th	
2015–16	5	1ª Aut.	13th	
2016–17	5	1ª Aut.	11th	
2017–18	5	1ª Aut.	14th	
2018–19	6	Reg. Pref.	9th	
2019–20	6	Reg. Pref.	15th	
2020–21	DNP			
2021–22	7	Reg. Pref.	9th	
2022–23	7	Reg. Pref.	14th	
2023–24	7	Reg. Pref.	2nd	
2024–25	6	1ª Aut.	9th	
2025–26	6	1ª Aut.		

- 1 season in Tercera División
