= CD Beti Onak =

Association football club in Spain

Beti Onak
- Full name: Club Deportivo Beti Onak
- Founded: 1950
- Ground: Lorenzo Goikoa, Villava, Navarre, Spain
- Capacity: 2,000
- Chairman: Marino Oscoz Oroz
- Manager: Ángel Arizcuren
- League: Tercera Federación – Group 15
- 2025–26: Tercera Federación – Group 15, 15th of 18
Home colours	Away colours

Club Deportivo Beti Onak is a Spanish sports club based in Villava in the autonomous community of Navarre. Founded in 1950, the club has football, handball and Basque pelota sections.

The football section was founded in 1966, it plays in Tercera Federación – Group 15, holding home matches at the Estadio Lorenzo Goikoa, with a capacity of 2,000 people.

== Season to season ==
Season	Tier	Division	Place	Copa del Rey
1971–72	6	3ª Reg.	2nd	
1972–73	6	3ª Reg.	4th	
1973–74	6	3ª Reg.	4th	
1974–75	6	2ª Reg.	10th	
1975–76	6	2ª Reg.	5th	
1976–77	6	2ª Reg.	7th	
1977–78	7	2ª Reg.	5th	
1978–79	7	2ª Reg.	1st	
1979–80	6	1ª Reg.	2nd	
1980–81	6	1ª Reg.	8th	
1981–82	6	1ª Reg.	1st	
1982–83	5	Reg. Pref.	7th	
1983–84	5	Reg. Pref.	7th	
1984–85	5	Reg. Pref.	12th	
1985–86	5	Reg. Pref.	8th	
1986–87	5	Reg. Pref.	12th	
1987–88	5	Reg. Pref.	2nd	
1988–89	5	Reg. Pref.	1st	
1989–90	4	3ª	18th	
1990–91	5	Reg. Pref.	1st	

Season	Tier	Division	Place	Copa del Rey
1991–92	4	3ª	8th	
1992–93	4	3ª	5th	
1993–94	4	3ª	7th	
1994–95	4	3ª	11th	
1995–96	4	3ª	11th	
1996–97	4	3ª	14th	
1997–98	4	3ª	12th	
1998–99	4	3ª	11th	
1999–2000	4	3ª	14th	
2000–01	4	3ª	11th	
2001–02	4	3ª	17th	
2002–03	4	3ª	18th	
2003–04	5	Reg. Pref.	3rd	
2004–05	4	3ª	3rd	
2005–06	4	3ª	18th	
2006–07	5	Reg. Pref.	14th	
2007–08	6	1ª Reg.	6th	
2008–09	6	1ª Reg.	11th	
2009–10	6	1ª Reg.	6th	
2010–11	6	1ª Reg.	7th	

Season	Tier	Division	Place	Copa del Rey
2011–12	6	1ª Reg.	1st	
2012–13	5	Reg. Pref.	1st	
2013–14	4	3ª	16th	
2014–15	4	3ª	17th	
2015–16	4	3ª	19th	
2016–17	5	1ª Aut.	7th	
2017–18	5	1ª Aut.	1st	
2018–19	4	3ª	12th	
2019–20	4	3ª	11th	
2020–21	4	3ª	7th / 1st	
2021–22	5	3ª RFEF	7th	
2022–23	5	3ª Fed.	6th	
2023–24	5	3ª Fed.	7th	
2024–25	5	3ª Fed.	14th	
2025–26	5	3ª Fed.	15th	
2026–27	5	3ª Fed.		

- 21 seasons in Tercera División
- 5 seasons in Tercera Federación/Tercera División RFEF
