= CD Oberena =

Spanish sports club

Oberena
- Full name: Club Deportivo Oberena
- Founded: 1940
- Ground: Oberena, Pamplona, Navarre, Spain
- Capacity: 2,500
- Chairman: (Spain) Tomás Pascualena
- Manager: (Spain) Carlos Mendivil
- League: Tercera Federación – Group 15
- 2024–25: Primera Autonómica, 3rd of 18 (promoted via play-offs)
Home colours	Away colours

Club Deportivo Oberena is a sports club based in Pamplona, in the autonomous community of Navarre, better known by its football section. Founded in 1940, they play in Tercera Federación – Group 15, holding home games at Estadio Oberena, with a capacity of 2,500 seats.

== Season to season ==
Season	Tier	Division	Place	Copa del Rey
1941–42	4	2ª Reg.	2nd	
1942–43	3	1ª Reg.	1st	
1943–44	4	1ª Reg.	1st	Third round
1944–45	4	1ª Reg.	5th	
1945–46	4	1ª Reg.	7th	
1946–47	4	1ª Reg.	1st	
1947–48	4	1ª Reg.	1st	
1948–49	4	1ª Reg.	2nd	
1949–50	4	1ª Reg.	3rd	
1950–51	4	1ª Reg.	3rd	
1951–52	4	1ª Reg.	6th	
1952–53	4	1ª Reg.	6th	
1953–54	4	1ª Reg.	9th	
1954–55	4	1ª Reg.	1st	
1955–56	3	3ª	9th	
1956–57	3	3ª	13th	
1957–58	3	3ª	8th	
1958–59	3	3ª	16th	
1959–60	DNP			
1960–61	DNP			

Season	Tier	Division	Place	Copa del Rey
1961–62	5	2ª Reg.	1st	
1962–63	4	1ª Reg.	1st	
1963–64	3	3ª	11th	
1964–65	3	3ª	6th	
1965–66	3	3ª	11th	
1966–67	3	3ª	3rd	
1967–68	3	3ª	6th	
1968–69	3	3ª	10th	
1969–70	3	3ª	15th	Fourth round
1970–71	4	1ª Reg.	1st	
1971–72	3	3ª	20th	First round
1972–73	4	1ª Reg.	6th	
1973–74	4	1ª Reg.	12th	
1974–75	4	Reg. Pref.	8th	
1975–76	4	Reg. Pref.	7th	
1976–77	4	Reg. Pref.	8th	
1977–78	5	Reg. Pref.	12th	
1978–79	5	Reg. Pref.	8th	
1979–80	5	Reg. Pref.	14th	
1980–81	5	Reg. Pref.	4th	

Season	Tier	Division	Place	Copa del Rey
1981–82	5	Reg. Pref.	2nd	
1982–83	4	3ª	19th	
1983–84	5	Reg. Pref.	1st	
1984–85	4	3ª	15th	
1985–86	4	3ª	5th	
1986–87	4	3ª	17th	First round
1987–88	4	3ª	3rd	
1988–89	4	3ª	5th	
1989–90	4	3ª	8th	
1990–91	4	3ª	15th	
1991–92	4	3ª	13th	
1992–93	4	3ª	7th	
1993–94	4	3ª	13th	
1994–95	4	3ª	9th	
1995–96	4	3ª	2nd	
1996–97	4	3ª	3rd	
1997–98	4	3ª	5th	
1998–99	4	3ª	8th	
1999–2000	4	3ª	13th	
2000–01	4	3ª	15th	

Season	Tier	Division	Place	Copa del Rey
2001–02	4	3ª	15th	
2002–03	4	3ª	4th	
2003–04	4	3ª	8th	
2004–05	4	3ª	14th	
2005–06	4	3ª	5th	
2006–07	4	3ª	14th	
2007–08	4	3ª	12th	
2008–09	4	3ª	14th	
2009–10	4	3ª	10th	
2010–11	4	3ª	10th	
2011–12	4	3ª	11th	
2012–13	4	3ª	9th	
2013–14	4	3ª	8th	
2014–15	4	3ª	6th	
2015–16	4	3ª	17th	
2016–17	4	3ª	5th	
2017–18	4	3ª	17th	
2018–19	5	1ª Aut.	8th	
2019–20	5	1ª Aut.	7th	
2020–21	5	1ª Aut.	3rd	

Season	Tier	Division	Place	Copa del Rey
2021–22	6	1ª Aut.	1st	
2022–23	5	3ª Fed.	13th	
2023–24	5	3ª Fed.	14th	
2024–25	6	1ª Aut.	3rd	
2025–26	5	3ª Fed.		

- 47 seasons in Tercera División
- 3 seasons in Tercera Federación

== Famous players ==
- (Spain) Xavier Asurmendi
- (Spain) Pablo Lusarreta
- (Spain) Txiki
- (Spain) Ignacio Zoco
