= CD Peña Azagresa =

Association football club in Spain

Peña Azagresa
- Full name: Club Deportivo Peña Azagresa
- Founded: 1925
- Ground: Miguel Sola, Azagra, Navarre, Spain
- Capacity: 2,000
- Chairman: (Spain) Vicente Gurrea
- Manager: (Spain) Rafael Bericat Orta
- League: Primera Autonómica
- 2024–25: Primera Autonómica, 12th of 18
Home colours	Away colours

Club Deportivo Peña Azagresa is a Spanish football team based in Azagra in the autonomous community of Navarre. Founded in 1925, it plays in Primera Autonómica, holding home matches at Estadio Miguel Sola, with a capacity of 2,000 seats.

== Season to season ==
Season	Tier	Division	Place	Copa del Rey
1968–69	5	2ª Reg.	10th	
1969–70	5	2ª Reg.	8th	
1970–71	5	2ª Reg.	3rd	
1971–72	5	2ª Reg.	3rd	
1972–73	5	2ª Reg.	2nd	
1973–74	5	2ª Reg.	1st	
1974–75	4	Reg. Pref.	15th	
1975–76	5	1ª Reg.	1st	
1976–77	4	Reg. Pref.	4th	
1977–78	5	Reg. Pref.	5th	
1978–79	5	Reg. Pref.	9th	
1979–80	5	Reg. Pref.	13th	
1980–81	5	Reg. Pref.	16th	
1981–82	5	Reg. Pref.	15th	
1982–83	5	Reg. Pref.	17th	
1983–84	5	Reg. Pref.	20th	
1984–85	6	1ª Reg.	14th	
1985–86	7	2ª Reg.	2nd	
1986–87	6	1ª Reg.	7th	
1987–88	6	1ª Reg.	8th	

Season	Tier	Division	Place	Copa del Rey
1988–89	6	1ª Reg.	5th	
1989–90	6	1ª Reg.	3rd	
1990–91	6	1ª Reg.	5th	
1991–92	6	1ª Reg.	6th	
1992–93	6	1ª Reg.	7th	
1993–94	6	1ª Reg.	7th	
1994–95	6	1ª Reg.	7th	
1995–96	6	1ª Reg.	1st	
1996–97	6	1ª Reg.	12th	
1997–98	6	1ª Reg.	4th	
1998–99	6	1ª Reg.	15th	
1999–2000	6	1ª Reg.	13th	
2000–01	6	1ª Reg.	12th	
2001–02	6	1ª Reg.	2nd	
2002–03	6	1ª Reg.	4th	
2003–04	6	1ª Reg.	5th	
2004–05	5	Reg. Pref.	2nd	
2005–06	5	Reg. Pref.	2nd	
2006–07	5	Reg. Pref.	4th	
2007–08	5	Reg. Pref.	1st	

Season	Tier	Division	Place	Copa del Rey
2008–09	4	3ª	16th	
2009–10	4	3ª	15th	
2010–11	4	3ª	20th	
2011–12	5	Reg. Pref.	2nd	
2012–13	4	3ª	19th	
2013–14	5	Reg. Pref.	9th	
2014–15	5	Reg. Pref.	5th	
2015–16	5	1ª Aut.	6th	
2016–17	5	1ª Aut.	3rd	
2017–18	5	1ª Aut.	4th	
2018–19	5	1ª Aut.	1st	
2019–20	4	3ª	17th	First round
2020–21	4	3ª	7th	
2021–22	6	1ª Aut.	5th	
2022–23	6	1ª Aut.	2nd	
2023–24	6	1ª Aut.	6th	
2024–25	6	1ª Aut.	12th	
2025–26	6	1ª Aut.		

- 6 seasons in Tercera División
