= 2004–05 Tercera División =

Tercera División
- Season: 2004–05
- Dates: August 2004–June 2005
- Matches played: 12,920

The 2004–05 Tercera División was the fourth division in Spanish football.

== Classification ==
Key to colors in league table:
Play-off for promotion
Direct relegation

=== Group I ===
Pos	Team	Pld	W	D	L	GF	GA	GD	Pts
1	Rápido Bouzas	38	21	11	6	53	26	+27	74
2	Feiraco Negreira	38	21	9	8	52	24	+28	72
3	CD Lugo	38	20	11	7	58	30	+28	71
4	Coruxo FC	38	20	8	10	47	26	+21	68
5	Laracha CF	38	18	11	9	48	25	+23	65
6	CCD Cerceda	38	18	10	10	71	45	+26	64
7	CD Lalín	38	18	9	11	51	36	+15	63
8	Deportivo de La Coruña B	38	15	11	12	54	36	+18	56
9	Narón BP	38	14	9	15	49	47	+2	51
10	Betanzos CF	38	14	8	16	47	52	−5	50
11	Viveiro CF	38	11	16	11	50	51	−1	49
12	Bergantiños FC	38	12	11	15	46	54	−8	47
13	Alondras CF	38	13	6	19	46	74	−28	45
14	Portonovo SD	38	10	13	15	32	49	−17	43
15	Arousa SC	38	10	13	15	32	39	−7	43
16	Villalonga FC	38	10	9	19	40	60	−20	39
17	SD O Val	38	9	11	18	30	60	−30	38
18	Porriño Industrial FC (R)	38	8	11	19	36	53	−17	35
19	CD Grove (R)	38	9	7	22	42	69	−27	34
20	Verín CF (R)	38	9	6	23	31	59	−28	33

(R) Relegated

=== Group II ===
Pos	Team	Pld	W	D	L	GF	GA	GD	Pts
1	Real Oviedo CF	38	25	7	6	75	30	+45	82
2	Ribadesella CF	38	25	4	9	68	45	+23	79
3	CD Mosconia	38	21	10	7	61	35	+26	73
4	UP Langreo	38	22	6	10	61	29	+32	72
5	Real Sporting de Gijón B	38	20	10	8	71	31	+40	70
6	Real Avilés Industrial	38	18	10	10	54	40	+14	64
7	Caudal Deportivo	38	17	10	11	63	46	+17	61
8	AD Universidad de Oviedo	38	17	9	12	62	44	+18	60
9	Oviedo Astur CF	38	15	9	14	65	50	+15	54
10	Club Siero	38	13	14	11	47	45	+2	53
11	Unión C. Ceares	38	15	7	16	49	55	−6	52
12	CD Lealtad	38	15	6	17	51	49	+2	51
13	Real Titánico	38	15	4	19	54	59	−5	49
14	UD Gijón Industrial	38	12	8	18	39	65	−26	44
15	Club Hispano	38	13	4	21	34	67	−33	43
16	Berrón CF	38	10	10	18	36	54	−18	40
17	Navarro CF	38	11	7	20	44	69	−25	40
18	CD Llanes (R)	38	9	11	18	40	59	−19	38
19	CD San Martín Sotr. (R)	38	6	5	27	34	70	−36	23
20	Andés CF (R)	38	1	9	28	22	88	−66	12

(R) Relegated

=== Group III ===
Pos	Team	Pld	W	D	L	GF	GA	GD	Pts
1	Racing de Santander B	38	28	7	3	84	24	+60	91
2	UM Escobedo	38	20	10	8	66	37	+29	70
3	SD Barreda Balompié	38	19	10	9	49	47	+2	67
4	SD Noja	38	19	9	10	63	36	+27	66
5	CD Tropezón	38	19	7	12	56	38	+18	64
6	CD Bezana	38	17	12	9	50	34	+16	63
7	Velarde CF	38	19	5	14	65	45	+20	62
8	CF Ribamontán	38	14	14	10	54	45	+9	56
9	SD Reocín	38	14	7	17	47	50	−3	49
10	Castro CF	38	12	12	14	55	56	−1	48
11	SD Atlético Albericia	38	13	9	16	48	57	−9	48
12	AD Siete Villas	38	11	14	13	55	56	−1	47
13	CD Laredo	38	12	10	16	42	47	−5	46
14	SD Solares	38	12	8	18	52	67	−15	44
15	Trasmiera FC	38	10	14	14	36	42	−6	44
16	CF Vimenor	38	10	14	14	40	50	−10	44
17	CD Barquereño	38	11	9	18	31	53	−22	42
18	SD Textil Escudo (R)	38	12	6	20	46	73	−27	42
19	CD Guarnizo (R)	38	7	13	18	29	52	−23	34
20	CA Deva (R)	38	4	4	30	30	89	−59	16

(R) Relegated

=== Group IV ===
Pos	Team	Pld	W	D	L	GF	GA	GD	Pts
1	Club Portugalete	38	25	8	5	75	29	+46	83
2	Zalla UC	38	22	9	7	58	29	+29	75
3	SD Gernika Club	38	21	11	6	51	25	+26	74
4	SCD Durango	38	22	4	12	52	30	+22	70
5	Zamudio SD	38	19	8	11	40	26	+14	65
6	SD Beasaín	38	18	10	10	47	38	+9	64
7	Arenas Club de Getxo	38	13	13	12	39	32	+7	52
8	CD Baskonia	38	13	12	13	53	46	+7	51
9	SD Indautxu	38	13	11	14	42	49	−7	50
10	CD Aurrerá Ondarroa	38	13	11	14	29	36	−7	50
11	CD Lagún Onak	38	12	11	15	37	42	−5	47
12	SD San Pedro	38	12	11	15	51	50	+1	47
13	SD Amorebieta	38	14	5	19	43	47	−4	47
14	CD Elgóibar	38	10	16	12	54	55	−1	46
15	CD Llodio Salleko	38	11	12	15	44	46	−2	45
16	SD Eibar B	38	12	9	17	33	47	−14	45
17	CD Aurrerá de Vitoria	38	10	13	15	37	49	−12	43
18	Deportivo Alavés C (R)	38	10	9	19	44	52	−8	39
19	Berio FT (R)	38	7	10	21	31	58	−27	31
20	SD Bruno Villarreal (R)	38	3	7	28	23	97	−74	16

(R) Relegated

=== Group V ===
Pos	Team	Pld	W	D	L	GF	GA	GD	Pts
1	CD L'Hospitalet	38	26	2	10	86	36	+50	80
2	CE Mataró	38	21	9	8	70	31	+39	72
3	UE Sant Andreu	38	22	6	10	58	34	+24	72
4	CF Reus Deportiu	38	19	8	11	60	39	+21	65
5	CF Peralada	38	19	7	12	57	43	+14	64
6	FC Santboià	38	18	9	11	47	39	+8	63
7	CF Balaguer	38	16	13	9	53	45	+8	61
8	EC Granollers	38	17	9	12	45	39	+6	60
9	CF Gavà	38	14	13	11	44	47	−3	55
10	FE Figueres	38	14	11	13	36	39	−3	53
11	UD Castelldefels	38	14	9	15	52	54	−2	51
12	Palamós CF	28	2	10	16	33	46	−13	16
13	UE Rubí	38	11	13	14	45	61	−16	46
14	CF Vilanova	38	11	12	15	45	39	+6	45
15	FC Barcelona C	38	9	17	12	44	54	−10	44
16	UE Cornellà	38	11	8	19	37	55	−18	41
17	CE Manresa	38	9	9	20	43	68	−25	36
18	UE Vilassar Mar (R)	38	8	10	20	50	74	−24	34
19	CE Banyoles (R)	38	6	11	21	32	63	−31	29
20	UE Tàrrega (R)	38	4	12	22	31	62	−31	24

(R) Relegated

=== Group VI ===
Pos	Team	Pld	W	D	L	GF	GA	GD	Pts
1	Valencia Mestalla	38	21	10	7	67	23	+44	73
2	CF Gandía	38	16	18	4	52	29	+23	66
3	CD Eldense	38	16	17	5	50	33	+17	65
4	Santa Pola CF	38	17	12	9	49	41	+8	63
5	Villarreal CF B	38	17	12	9	77	47	+30	63
6	Elche B	38	16	14	8	50	42	+8	62
7	CD Onda	38	15	14	9	58	42	+16	59
8	CD Denia	38	15	13	10	51	41	+10	58
9	Catarroja CF	38	14	13	11	52	41	+11	55
10	Alicante B	38	13	13	12	42	48	−6	52
11	Burjassot CF	38	13	12	13	42	44	−2	51
12	Ontinyent CF	38	14	9	15	57	53	+4	51
13	CD Burriana	38	12	8	18	45	53	−8	44
14	Pego CF	38	10	12	16	41	58	−17	42
15	UD Puçol	38	8	16	14	34	45	−11	40
16	UD Oliva	38	9	12	17	34	42	−8	39
17	CD Benicàssim	38	9	11	18	50	68	−18	38
18	Paterna CF (R)	38	9	10	19	35	62	−27	37
19	Torrellano CF (R)	38	7	15	16	38	54	−16	36
20	CD Acero (R)	38	5	7	26	34	92	−58	22

(R) Relegated

=== Group VII ===
Pos	Team	Pld	W	D	L	GF	GA	GD	Pts
1	CD Las Rozas	38	22	8	8	52	31	+21	74
2	CD Móstoles	38	21	9	8	67	39	+28	72
3	AD Parla	38	19	8	11	56	40	+16	65
4	CD Ciempozuelos	38	17	12	9	53	33	+20	63
5	CA Pinto	38	17	11	10	57	45	+12	62
6	SAD Tres Cantos Pegaso	38	17	11	10	74	50	+24	62
7	Rayo Vallecano B	38	16	13	9	69	43	+26	61
8	CF Rayo Majadahonda	38	16	11	11	60	39	+21	59
9	Getafe CF B	38	15	9	14	50	52	−2	54
10	CD Cobeña	38	14	12	12	53	45	+8	54
11	Real Madrid C	38	13	15	10	52	44	+8	54
12	DAV Santa Ana	38	15	9	14	54	58	−4	54
13	Atlético Aviación	38	15	5	18	52	64	−12	50
14	CD Leganés B	38	14	7	17	50	59	−9	49
15	CD San Fernando de H.	38	13	9	16	52	61	−9	48
16	Real Aranjuez CF	38	12	10	16	35	41	−6	46
17	AD Orcasitas (R)	38	11	8	19	33	51	−18	41
18	AD Colmenar Viejo (R)	38	8	10	20	37	68	−31	34
19	AD Torrejón CF (R)	38	5	12	21	36	66	−30	27
20	CD El Álamo (R)	38	3	5	30	35	98	−63	14

(R) Relegated

=== Group VIII ===
Pos	Team	Pld	W	D	L	GF	GA	GD	Pts
1	CF Promesas Ponferrada	38	24	9	5	69	22	+47	81
2	Real Ávila CF	38	24	7	7	72	26	+46	79
3	Gimnástica Segoviana	38	24	7	7	77	32	+45	79
4	Real Valladolid B	38	21	11	6	57	31	+26	74
5	Arandina CF	38	21	9	8	58	26	+32	72
6	Salamanca B	38	19	8	11	55	39	+16	65
7	Numancia B	38	18	7	13	63	53	+10	61
8	Norma S.L. F.C.	38	15	15	8	55	41	+14	60
9	Cultural Leonesa B	38	15	11	12	56	53	+3	56
10	CD Huracán Z	38	14	13	11	49	39	+10	55
11	SD Hullera VL	38	11	14	13	32	38	−6	47
12	CD Becerril	38	12	9	17	46	61	−15	45
13	CD Jher Íscar	38	12	8	18	35	40	−5	44
14	CD Benavente	38	11	11	16	49	63	−14	44
15	Atlético Tordesillas	38	11	10	17	47	55	−8	43
16	SD Almazán	38	11	8	19	42	65	−23	41
17	La Bañeza FC	38	9	10	19	39	50	−11	37
18	SD Gimnástica Medinense (R)	38	9	9	20	51	88	−37	36
19	CF Cristo Atlético (R)	38	3	7	28	31	91	−60	16
20	Racing Lermeño CF (R)	38	2	5	31	20	90	−70	11

(R) Relegated

=== Group IX ===
Pos	Team	Pld	W	D	L	GF	GA	GD	Pts
1	CD Baza	38	27	4	7	78	22	+56	85
2	Torredonjimeno CF	38	24	8	6	69	29	+40	80
3	CD Roquetas	38	22	8	8	67	27	+40	74
4	CD Alhaurino	38	22	8	8	61	23	+38	74
5	Granada CF	38	22	7	9	69	35	+34	73
6	Comarca de Níjar	38	20	12	6	59	33	+26	72
7	UD Fuengirola LB	38	18	6	14	48	45	+3	60
8	Guadix CF	38	11	16	11	35	35	0	49
9	Motril CF	38	12	13	13	35	35	0	49
10	UD Carolinense	38	13	7	18	40	42	−2	46
11	CD Santa Fe	38	11	11	16	35	51	−16	44
12	UD Maracena	38	10	14	14	32	38	−6	44
13	Úbeda CF	38	11	11	16	38	46	−8	44
14	CD Imperio de Albolote	38	11	11	16	40	43	−3	44
15	UD Almería B	38	10	13	15	36	44	−8	43
16	CD Vera de Almería	38	12	6	20	40	56	−16	42
17	Loja CD	38	10	10	18	26	39	−13	40
18	Atlético Mancha Real (R)	38	9	12	17	28	46	−18	39
19	CP Granada 74 (R)	38	10	6	22	38	73	−35	36
20	CF Rusadir (R)	38	2	3	33	20	132	−112	9

(R) Relegated

=== Group X ===
Pos	Team	Pld	W	D	L	GF	GA	GD	Pts
1	CD Villanueva	40	24	10	6	72	36	+36	82
2	UD Los Barrios	40	22	10	8	54	41	+13	76
3	Racing Club Portuense	40	20	7	13	47	36	+11	67
4	Balompédica Linense	40	20	7	13	68	38	+30	67
5	UD Los Palacios	40	18	11	11	63	43	+20	65
6	CD Pozoblanco	40	17	13	10	54	31	+23	64
7	CD San Fernando	40	15	16	9	54	46	+8	61
8	Real Betis B	40	15	14	11	58	50	+8	59
9	CA Lucentino Industrial	40	14	10	16	46	43	+3	52
10	Puerto Real CF	40	13	13	14	47	55	−8	52
11	Chiclana CF	40	12	15	13	55	63	−8	51
12	Jerez Industrial CF	40	14	8	18	50	52	−2	50
13	Dos Hermanas CF	40	11	15	14	43	55	−12	48
14	Bollullos CF	40	11	15	14	49	51	−2	48
15	Coria CF	40	11	15	14	48	57	−9	48
16	Atl. Sanluqueño CF	40	12	12	16	45	54	−9	48
17	Cádiz CF B	40	12	10	18	47	60	−13	46
18	AD Cerro del Águila (R)	40	12	10	18	35	51	−16	46
19	Atlético Antoniano (R)	40	12	8	20	45	56	−11	44
20	RCD Nueva Sevilla (R)	40	9	9	22	38	65	−27	36
21	AD Cartaya (R)	40	5	14	21	37	72	−35	29

(R) Relegated

=== Group XI ===
Pos	Team	Pld	W	D	L	GF	GA	GD	Pts
1	CD Constancia	38	27	6	5	84	34	+50	87
2	CD Manacor	38	20	15	3	62	27	+35	75
3	Santa Eulàlia	38	21	9	8	72	33	+39	72
4	CF Sporting Mahonés	38	20	11	7	57	31	+26	71
5	CF Vilafranca	38	20	11	7	60	40	+20	71
6	CD Ferriolense	38	18	5	15	59	46	+13	59
7	SD Eivissa	38	16	10	12	56	38	+18	58
8	UD Poblense	38	15	12	11	52	45	+7	57
9	CD Binissalem	38	15	9	14	50	54	−4	54
10	CD Santanyí	38	15	6	17	63	74	−11	51
11	Atlètic de Ciutadella	38	12	10	16	45	53	−8	46
12	CD Montuïri	38	12	10	16	43	49	−6	46
13	UD Arenal	38	10	15	13	43	50	−7	45
14	CF Sóller	38	12	9	17	67	70	−3	45
15	CE Platges de Calvià	38	8	18	12	48	51	−3	42
16	CE Alaior	38	11	7	20	37	66	−29	40
17	UD Collerense	38	10	7	21	52	79	−27	37
18	CD Campos (R)	38	9	5	24	41	71	−30	32
19	CD Atlético Baleares (R)	38	7	11	20	33	72	−39	32
20	SD Portmany (R)	38	4	10	24	36	77	−41	22

(R) Relegated

=== Grupo XII ===
Pos	Team	Pld	W	D	L	GF	GA	GD	Pts
1	SD Tenisca	38	22	10	6	77	33	+44	76
2	CD San Isidro	38	20	14	4	58	29	+29	74
3	AD Laguna	38	16	16	6	48	21	+27	64
4	CD Orientación Marítima	38	19	7	12	50	42	+8	64
5	UD Villa de Santa Brígida	38	14	17	7	47	37	+10	59
6	UD Las Zocas	38	15	13	10	56	33	+23	58
7	UD Gáldar	38	17	7	14	58	49	+9	58
8	Unión Antigua	38	15	7	16	48	57	−9	52
9	Universidad LPCF B	38	14	8	16	43	46	−3	50
10	UD Las Palmas B	38	12	14	12	53	44	+9	50
11	CD Mensajero	38	12	14	12	37	47	−10	50
12	AD Huracán	38	10	19	9	44	40	+4	49
13	UD Tegueste	38	12	12	14	35	40	−5	48
14	CD Maspalomas	38	12	12	14	46	54	−8	48
15	UD Tenerife Sur Ibarra	38	12	12	14	50	50	0	48
16	UD Realejos	38	14	5	19	43	60	−17	47
17	CD Teguise	38	10	13	15	40	50	−10	43
18	UD Telde (R)	38	9	8	21	37	58	−21	35
19	CD La Oliva (R)	38	7	8	23	36	85	−49	29
20	At. Arona (R)	38	5	10	23	36	67	−31	25

(R) Relegated

=== Grupo XIII ===
Pos	Team	Pld	W	D	L	GF	GA	GD	Pts
1	Águilas CF	38	20	16	2	79	30	+49	76
2	Sangonera Atlético CF	38	21	12	5	64	34	+30	75
3	AD Mar Menor	38	22	9	7	77	42	+35	75
4	Mazarrón CF	38	22	8	8	71	34	+37	74
5	Orihuela CF	38	21	11	6	54	24	+30	74
6	Real Murcia CF B	38	20	11	7	63	31	+32	71
7	UD Horadada	38	19	8	11	60	42	+18	65
8	Pinatar CF - EMF	38	15	9	14	56	46	+10	54
9	Cartagena Promesas CF	38	15	9	14	56	55	+1	54
10	Caravaca CF	38	15	5	18	49	62	−13	50
11	Jumilla CF	38	11	15	12	42	53	−11	48
12	CD Molinense	38	11	14	13	50	51	−1	47
13	AD Relesa Las Palas	38	11	12	15	60	59	+1	45
14	Centro Dep. Balsicas	38	11	8	19	52	78	−26	41
15	CD La Unión	38	10	10	18	49	65	−16	40
16	Calasparra CF	38	10	10	18	39	63	−24	40
17	CF Santomera	38	10	6	22	37	64	−27	36
18	CD Cieza (R)	38	9	7	22	41	74	−33	34
19	UCAM (R)	38	7	11	20	37	52	−15	32
20	CD Bala Azul (R)	38	4	1	33	36	113	−77	13

(R) Relegated

=== Grupo XIV ===
Pos	Team	Pld	W	D	L	GF	GA	GD	Pts
1	UD Mérida	38	29	6	3	69	12	+57	93
2	CF Villanovense	38	27	5	6	99	33	+66	86
3	AD Cerro de Reyes At.	38	26	8	4	91	27	+64	86
4	Moralo CP	38	23	7	8	62	32	+30	76
5	Imperio CP	38	21	10	7	58	29	+29	73
6	Sporting Villanueva	38	20	8	10	59	36	+23	68
7	CP Cacereño	38	17	11	10	51	33	+18	62
8	UP Plasencia	38	16	10	12	61	46	+15	58
9	CF Extremadura B	38	13	10	15	56	57	−1	49
10	CD Coria	38	14	6	18	50	68	−18	48
11	CD Miajadas	38	14	3	21	52	66	−14	45
12	SP Villafranca	38	11	10	17	50	56	−6	43
13	UC La Estrella	38	10	13	15	36	53	−17	43
14	CD Santa Amalia	38	8	14	16	32	44	−12	38
15	Olivenza CP	38	9	11	18	34	60	−26	38
16	CP Monesterio	38	9	9	20	26	63	−37	36
17	CP Amanecer	38	9	7	22	34	68	−34	34
18	CD Badajoz B (R)	38	7	11	20	37	58	−21	32
19	CD Grabasa Burguillos (R)	38	6	7	25	31	95	−64	25
20	Arroyo CP (R)	38	3	10	25	36	88	−52	19

(R) Relegated

=== Grupo XV Navarra ===
Pos	Team	Pld	W	D	L	GF	GA	GD	Pts
1	CD Valle de Egüés	34	20	8	6	58	20	+38	68
2	UD Mutilvera	34	20	7	7	51	24	+27	67
3	CD Beti Onak	34	17	5	12	53	43	+10	56
4	CD Iruña	34	13	14	7	45	36	+9	53
5	Murchante FC	34	15	6	13	38	44	−6	51
6	Lagun Artea KE	34	11	15	8	44	45	−1	48
7	CD Aluvión	34	12	11	11	39	44	−5	47
8	UCD Burladés	34	12	10	12	40	35	+5	46
9	CD River Ega	34	12	9	13	41	39	+2	45
10	CA Cirbonero	34	13	6	15	43	49	−6	45
11	CD Aoiz	34	13	5	16	38	48	−10	44
12	UDC Chantrea	34	11	10	13	39	43	−4	43
13	CD Tudelano	34	12	7	15	31	33	−2	43
14	CD Oberena	34	10	13	11	41	35	+6	43
15	CD Huarte	34	12	6	16	40	49	−9	42
16	CD Urroztarra (R)	34	11	7	16	37	46	−9	40
17	CD Izarra (R)	34	11	6	17	34	39	−5	39
18	CD Subiza (R)	34	5	7	22	29	69	−40	22

(R) Relegated

=== Grupo XV La Rioja ===
Pos	Team	Pld	W	D	L	GF	GA	GD	Pts
1	CD Calahorra	30	24	4	2	66	11	+55	76
2	AD Fundación Logroñés	30	21	6	3	68	27	+41	69
3	CD Logroñés	30	20	6	4	61	22	+39	66
4	CD Varea	30	13	11	6	46	26	+20	50
5	CD Anguiano	30	13	7	10	52	50	+2	46
6	CA River Ebro	30	13	4	13	47	41	+6	43
7	CD Arnedo	30	11	10	9	37	32	+5	43
8	CD Pradejón	30	11	7	12	39	43	−4	40
9	CD Agoncillo	30	10	9	11	40	44	−4	39
10	CD San Marcial	30	11	5	14	36	40	−4	38
11	CD Berceo	30	8	10	12	32	48	−16	34
12	SD Oyonesa	30	6	12	12	24	33	−9	30
13	Náxara CD	30	6	9	15	34	58	−24	27
14	CD Villegas	30	6	7	17	30	58	−28	25
15	CP San Cosme (R)	30	4	7	19	18	62	−44	19
16	Valvanera CD (R)	30	3	6	21	23	58	−35	15

(R) Relegated

=== Group XVI ===
Pos	Team	Pld	W	D	L	GF	GA	GD	Pts
1	UD Barbastro	38	21	9	8	62	35	+27	72
2	Utebo FC	38	20	11	7	70	30	+40	71
3	Universidad Zaragoza	38	18	15	5	71	39	+32	69
4	CD Sariñena	38	19	9	10	57	37	+20	66
5	AD Sabiñánigo	38	18	8	12	61	40	+21	62
6	Villanueva CF	38	18	7	13	58	52	+6	61
7	UD Casetas	38	17	9	12	69	57	+12	60
8	Andorra CF	38	15	14	9	61	49	+12	59
9	CF Jacetano	38	16	10	12	65	48	+17	58
10	Alcañiz CF	38	15	13	10	52	43	+9	58
11	Monzón	38	15	10	13	51	42	+9	55
12	CD Teruel	38	14	9	15	42	46	−4	51
13	Atlético Calatayud	38	13	10	15	36	42	−6	49
14	CD Ebro	38	12	12	14	39	49	−10	48
15	CD Binéfar	38	10	13	15	30	44	−14	43
16	CD Zuera	38	13	4	21	48	60	−12	43
17	UD Fraga	38	10	10	18	38	55	−17	40
18	CD Alagón (R)	38	8	11	19	42	65	−23	35
19	SD Ejea (R)	38	5	9	24	24	72	−48	24
20	UD La Fueva (R)	38	5	3	30	37	108	−71	18

(R) Relegated

=== Group XVII ===
Pos	Team	Pld	W	D	L	GF	GA	GD	Pts
1	UD Almansa	38	23	8	7	76	36	+40	77
2	Albacete B	38	22	8	8	72	28	+44	74
3	CF Gimnástico Alcázar	38	21	9	8	55	33	+22	72
4	UD Talavera	38	22	5	11	60	37	+23	71
5	UD Puertollano	38	19	12	7	63	32	+31	69
6	La Roda Caja Rural CF	38	19	11	8	57	36	+21	68
7	Manchego CF	38	17	11	10	38	25	+13	62
8	CD Guadalajara	38	15	13	10	55	46	+9	58
9	CP Villarrobledo	38	15	12	11	42	35	+7	57
10	CD Toledo	38	15	9	14	47	33	+14	54
11	CD Quintanar del Rey	38	14	9	15	44	50	−6	51
12	Daimiel CF	38	12	6	20	41	61	−20	42
13	CF La Solana	38	10	11	17	31	42	−11	41
14	CD Cuenca	38	11	8	19	52	62	−10	41
15	Conquense B	38	11	7	20	50	80	−30	40
16	CA Tarazona	38	9	12	17	40	50	−10	39
17	UD Socuéllamos	38	9	12	17	39	54	−15	39
18	CD Torrijos (R)	38	10	8	20	33	61	−28	38
19	AD Torpedo 66 (R)	38	8	11	19	31	55	−24	35
20	Hellín Deportivo (R)	38	3	8	27	31	101	−70	17

(R) Relegated
