= CD Corellano =

Association football club in Spain

Corellano
- Full name: Club Deportivo Corellano
- Founded: 9 August 1929; 97 years ago
- Ground: Ombatillo, Corella, Navarre, Spain
- Capacity: 2,500
- President: José Miguel Sanz
- Manager: Javi Serrano
- League: Primera Autonómica
- 2025–26: Regional Preferente – Group 2, 3rd of 16 (promoted via play-offs)
Home colours	Away colours

Club Deportivo Corellano is a Spanish football club based in Corella, in the autonomous community of Navarre. Founded in 1929, the club play in the Regional Preferente – Group 1, holding home matches at the Campo de Fútbol Municipal de Ombatillo.

== Season to season ==
Season	Tier	Division	Place	Copa del Rey
1959–60	5	2ª Reg.	1st	
1960–61	4	1ª Reg.	10th	
1961–62	4	1ª Reg.	10th	
1962–63	4	1ª Reg.	6th	
1963–64	4	1ª Reg.	10th	
1964–65	4	1ª Reg.	11th	
1965–66	4	1ª Reg.	12th	
1966–67	4	1ª Reg.	14th	
1967–68	5	2ª Reg.	2nd	
1968–69	5	2ª Reg.	8th	
1969–70	5	2ª Reg.	(R)	
1970–71	DNP			
1971–72	DNP			
1972–73	6	3ª Reg.	3rd	
1973–74	6	3ª Reg.	2nd	
1974–75	5	1ª Reg.	5th	
1975–76	5	1ª Reg.	4th	
1976–77	5	1ª Reg.	2nd	
1977–78	5	Reg. Pref.	3rd	
1978–79	5	Reg. Pref.	2nd	

Season	Tier	Division	Place	Copa del Rey
1979–80	4	3ª	16th	Third round
1980–81	4	3ª	12th	
1981–82	4	3ª	6th	
1982–83	4	3ª	17th	First round
1983–84	4	3ª	3rd	
1984–85	4	3ª	7th	Second round
1985–86	4	3ª	14th	
1986–87	4	3ª	9th	
1987–88	4	3ª	5th	
1988–89	4	3ª	17th	
1989–90	4	3ª	20th	
1990–91	5	Reg. Pref.	16th	
1991–92	6	1ª Reg.	1st	
1992–93	5	Reg. Pref.	7th	
1993–94	5	Reg. Pref.	3rd	
1994–95	5	Reg. Pref.	12th	
1995–96	5	Reg. Pref.	16th	
1996–97	5	Reg. Pref.	17th	
1997–98	5	Reg. Pref.	17th	
1998–99	6	1ª Reg.	4th	

Season	Tier	Division	Place	Copa del Rey
1999–2000	6	1ª Reg.	2nd	
2000–01	5	Reg. Pref.	5th	
2001–02	5	Reg. Pref.	12th	
2002–03	5	Reg. Pref.	18th	
2003–04	6	1ª Reg.	6th	
2004–05	6	1ª Reg.	9th	
2005–06	6	1ª Reg.	7th	
2006–07	6	1ª Reg.	3rd	
2007–08	6	1ª Reg.	1st	
2008–09	5	Reg. Pref.	5th	
2009–10	5	Reg. Pref.	5th	
2010–11	5	Reg. Pref.	2nd	
2011–12	5	Reg. Pref.	6th	
2012–13	5	Reg. Pref.	1st	
2013–14	4	3ª	14th	
2014–15	4	3ª	20th	
2015–16	5	1ª Aut.	4th	
2016–17	4	3ª	16th	
2017–18	4	3ª	16th	
2018–19	4	3ª	15th	

Season	Tier	Division	Place	Copa del Rey
2019–20	4	3ª	13th	
2020–21	4	3ª	8th / 4th	
2021–22	5	3ª RFEF	15th	
2022–23	6	1ª Aut.	8th	
2023–24	6	1ª Aut.	14th	
2024–25	7	Reg. Pref.	5th	
2025–26	7	Reg. Pref.		

- 18 seasons in Tercera División
- 1 season in Tercera División RFEF
