= CD River Ega =

River Ega
- Full name: Club Deportivo River Ega
- Founded: 1926
- Ground: Andola, Andosilla, Navarre, Spain
- Capacity: 1,500
- Chairman: (Spain) Jaime Resano
- Manager: (Spain) Mario Amatria
- League: Primera Autonómica
- 2024–25: Regional Preferente – Group 2, 1st of 16 (champions)
Home colours	Away colours

Club Deportivo River Ega is a Spanish football team based in Andosilla in the autonomous community of Navarre. Founded in 1926, it plays in Primera Autonómica. Its stadium is Campo de Fútbol Andola with a capacity of 1,500 seaters.

It is the formative club of Carlos Gurpegui, an important player for Athletic Bilbao, who was raised locally.

== Season to season ==
Season	Tier	Division	Place	Copa del Rey
1949–50	5	2ª Reg.	6th	
1950–51	5	2ª Reg.	5th	
1951–52	DNP			
1952–53	5	2ª Reg.	5th	
1953–1968	DNP			
1968–69	5	2ª Reg.	9th	
1969–70	5	2ª Reg.	5th	
1970–71	5	2ª Reg.	10th	
1971–72	5	2ª Reg.	8th	
1972–73	5	2ª Reg.	7th	
1973–74	5	2ª Reg.	10th	
1974–75	5	1ª Reg.	5th	
1975–76	5	1ª Reg.	7th	
1976–77	5	1ª Reg.	7th	
1977–78	6	1ª Reg.	12th	
1978–79	6	1ª Reg.	9th	
1979–80	6	1ª Reg.	1st	
1980–81	5	Reg. Pref.	18th	
1981–82	6	1ª Reg.	2nd	
1982–83	5	Reg. Pref.	20th	

Season	Tier	Division	Place	Copa del Rey
1983–84	6	1ª Reg.	16th	
1984–85	6	1ª Reg.	6th	
1985–86	6	1ª Reg.	14th	
1986–87	6	1ª Reg.	3rd	
1987–88	6	1ª Reg.	4th	
1988–89	6	1ª Reg.	8th	
1989–90	6	1ª Reg.	6th	
1990–91	6	1ª Reg.	7th	
1991–92	6	1ª Reg.	15th	
1992–93	6	1ª Reg.	8th	
1993–94	6	1ª Reg.	2nd	
1994–95	6	1ª Reg.	6th	
1995–96	6	1ª Reg.	2nd	
1996–97	6	1ª Reg.	9th	
1997–98	6	1ª Reg.	2nd	
1998–99	6	1ª Reg.	12th	
1999–2000	6	1ª Reg.	7th	
2000–01	6	1ª Reg.	9th	
2001–02	6	1ª Reg.	1st	
2002–03	5	Reg. Pref.	12th	

Season	Tier	Division	Place	Copa del Rey
2003–04	5	Reg. Pref.	2nd	
2004–05	4	3ª	9th	
2005–06	4	3ª	15th	
2006–07	4	3ª	11th	
2007–08	4	3ª	13th	
2008–09	4	3ª	14th	
2009–10	4	3ª	14th	
2010–11	4	3ª	19th	
2011–12	5	Reg. Pref.	8th	
2012–13	5	Reg. Pref.	8th	
2013–14	5	Reg. Pref.	4th	
2014–15	5	Reg. Pref.	1st	
2015–16	4	3ª	9th	
2016–17	4	3ª	14th	
2017–18	4	3ª	19th	
2018–19	5	1ª Aut.	14th	
2019–20	5	1ª Aut.	2nd	
2020–21	4	3ª	11th / 8th	
2021–22	6	1ª Aut.	4th	
2022–23	6	1ª Aut.	11th	

Season	Tier	Division	Place	Copa del Rey
2023–24	7	Reg. Pref.	7th	
2024–25	7	Reg. Pref.	1st	
2025–26	6	1ª Aut.		

- 11 seasons in Tercera División
