= Universidad de Las Palmas CF B =

Universidad Las Palmas "B"
- Full name: Universidad de Las Palmas; Club de Fútbol "B"
- Founded: 1998
- Dissolved: 7 July 2011
- Ground: Alfonso Silva; Las Palmas de Gran Canaria, Canary Islands, Spain
- Capacity: 2,000
- 2010–11: Regional Preferente, 10th
Home colours	Away colours

Universidad de Las Palmas Club de Fútbol "B" were a Spanish football club, founded in 1998, located in Las Palmas de Gran Canaria. Due to the first team dissolution, the reserve team was forced to dissolve. They were the reserve team of Universidad de Las Palmas CF.

== Season to season ==
Season	Tier	Division	Place
1998–99	7	2ª Reg.	1st
1999–2000	6	1ª Reg.	1st
2000–01	5	Int. Pref.	1st
2001–02	5	Int. Pref.	3rd
2002–03	5	Int. Pref.	1st
2003–04	4	3ª	15th
2004–05	4	3ª	9th
2005–06	4	3ª	20th
2006–07	5	Int. Pref.	1st
2007–08	4	3ª	9th
2008–09	4	3ª	13th
2009–10	4	3ª	21st
2010–11	5	Int. Pref.	10th

- 6 seasons in Tercera División
