= 2009–10 Tercera División =

Tercera División
- Season: 2009–10
- Promoted: Deportivo B; Gandía; Atlético Baleares; Alcalá; Real Sociedad B; Teruel; Badajoz; Caudal; Rayo B; Getafe B; Yeclano; Coruxo; Santboià; La Muela; Alzira; Peña Sport; Extremadura; L'Hospitalet

The 2009–10 Tercera División was the fourth tier of football in Spain. Play started on 29 August 2009 and ended on 20 June 2010 with the promotion play-off finals.

== Overview ==
There were 362 clubs competing in Tercera División (Third division) in the 2009–10 season, divided into 18 regional groups, accommodating between 20 and 22 clubs.

The following clubs finished as champions of their respective groups

- Grupo I (Galicia) - Deportivo B
- Grupo II (Asturias) - Caudal
- Grupo III (Cantabria) - Noja
- Grupo IV (País Vasco) - Real Sociedad B
- Grupo V (Cataluña) - L'Hospitalet
- Grupo VI (Comunidad Valenciana) - Gandía
- Grupo VII (Comunidad de Madrid) - Rayo B
- Grupo VIII (Castilla & León) - Burgos
- Grupo IX (Andalucía Oriental (Almería, Granada, Jaén & Málaga) & Melilla) - At. Mancha Real
- Grupo X (Andalucía Occidental (Cádiz, Córdoba, Huelva & Sevilla) & Ceuta) - Alcalá
- Grupo XI (Islas Baleares) - Atlético Baleares
- Grupo XII (Canarias) - Corralejo
- Grupo XIII (Región de Murcia) - Jumilla
- Grupo XIV (Extremadura) - Badajoz
- Grupo XV (Navarra) - Tudelano
- Grupo XVI (La Rioja) - Oyonesa
- Grupo XVII (Aragón) - Teruel
- Grupo XVIII (Castilla-La Mancha) - La Roda

The 18 group champion clubs participated in the Group winners promotion play-off and the losers from these 9 play-off ties then proceeded to the Non-champions promotion play-off with clubs finishing second third and fourth.

== League standings ==
Key to colours in league table:
Promoted via playoffs
Participated in playoffs
Direct relegation

=== Group I - Galicia ===
Pos	Team	Pld	W	D	L	GF	GA	GD	Pts
1	Deportivo B (C, P)	36	26	4	6	65	33	+32	82
2	Cerceda	36	21	7	8	52	29	+23	70
3	Ourense	36	19	11	6	70	34	+36	68
4	Coruxo (P)	36	17	13	6	54	32	+22	64
5	Narón	36	18	5	13	49	45	+4	59
6	Alondras	36	14	12	10	48	38	+10	54
7	Órdenes	36	15	8	13	46	43	+3	53
8	Negreira	36	14	9	13	41	37	+4	51
9	Racing Villalbés	36	12	12	12	36	37	−1	48
10	Rápido Bouzas	36	12	11	13	37	35	+2	47
11	Santa Comba	36	13	7	16	44	48	−4	46
12	Villalonga	36	11	11	14	36	39	−3	44
13	Cultural Areas	36	11	11	14	34	50	−16	44
14	Bergantiños	36	11	9	16	30	49	−19	42
15	Pontevedra B	36	11	7	18	44	48	−4	40
16	Somozas	36	11	6	19	40	56	−16	39
17	Lalín (R)	36	9	11	16	38	51	−13	38
18	Céltiga (R)	36	8	12	16	35	48	−13	36
19	Verín (R)	36	3	6	27	26	79	−53	15
20	Ciudad Santiago (Note: Team withdrawn from the competition and consequently dissolved) (D)	0	0	0	0	0	0	0	0

(C) Champions; (D) Dissolved; (P) Promoted; (R) Relegated

=== Group II - Asturias ===
Pos	Team	Pld	W	D	L	GF	GA	GD	Pts
1	Caudal (C, P)	38	25	8	5	73	27	+46	83
2	Marino	38	23	11	4	73	36	+37	80
3	Univ. Oviedo	38	23	7	8	81	38	+43	76
4	Llanes	38	21	7	10	68	38	+30	70
5	Langreo	38	18	12	8	60	35	+25	66
6	Ribadesella	38	19	8	11	63	44	+19	65
7	Tuilla	38	19	7	12	74	56	+18	64
8	Candás	38	15	14	9	49	32	+17	59
9	Real Avilés	38	16	10	12	48	41	+7	58
10	Lealtad	38	16	9	13	51	45	+6	57
11	Navarro	38	10	15	13	49	57	−8	45
12	Condal	38	12	8	18	36	59	−23	44
13	Ceares	38	12	8	18	39	59	−20	44
14	Cudillero	38	10	10	18	43	64	−21	40
15	Gijón Ind.	38	10	9	19	37	65	−28	39
16	Praviano	38	10	8	20	31	52	−21	38
17	Luarca	38	9	9	20	31	53	−22	36
18	Colloto (R)	38	10	5	23	34	60	−26	35
19	Covadonga (R)	38	9	6	23	35	61	−26	33
20	Astur (R)	38	6	3	29	31	84	−53	21

(C) Champions; (P) Promoted; (R) Relegated

=== Group III - Cantabria ===
Pos	Team	Pld	W	D	L	GF	GA	GD	Pts
1	Noja (C)	38	23	11	4	85	31	+54	80
2	Escobedo	38	20	12	6	61	35	+26	72
3	Tropezón	38	21	8	9	81	39	+42	71
4	Bezana	38	20	10	8	67	34	+33	70
5	Laredo	38	21	5	12	58	41	+17	68
6	Rayo Cantabria	38	19	10	9	72	46	+26	67
7	Reocín	38	18	9	11	54	49	+5	63
8	Siete Villas	38	18	8	12	66	60	+6	62
9	Cayón	38	17	9	12	50	39	+11	60
10	Ribamontán	38	15	8	15	54	52	+2	53
11	Atl. Albericia	38	13	9	16	49	55	−6	48
12	Solares	38	12	11	15	51	59	−8	47
13	Pontejos	38	12	9	17	65	73	−8	45
14	Buelna	38	13	5	20	57	77	−20	44
15	Castro	38	12	5	21	40	60	−20	41
16	Vimenor	38	10	9	19	38	53	−15	39
17	Selaya (Note: Due to the relegation of Racing B, from Segunda División B to this group, Selaya was forced to relegate to Primera Regional.) (R)	38	9	9	20	48	90	−42	36
18	Barreda (R)	38	9	8	21	36	58	−22	35
19	Textil Escudo (R)	38	10	3	25	50	79	−29	33
20	Atl. Deva (R)	38	6	6	26	40	92	−52	24

(C) Champions; (R) Relegated

=== Group IV - Basque Country ===
Pos	Team	Pld	W	D	L	GF	GA	GD	Pts
1	Real Sociedad B (C, P)	38	21	12	5	68	23	+45	75
2	Portugalete	38	19	12	7	65	31	+34	69
3	Amorebieta	38	19	11	8	58	34	+24	68
4	Elgoibar	38	19	8	11	40	29	+11	65
5	Gernika	38	17	12	9	54	38	+16	63
6	Beasain	38	18	9	11	58	35	+23	63
7	Durango	38	15	14	9	56	44	+12	59
8	Amurrio	38	14	15	9	53	42	+11	57
9	Zamudio	38	16	8	14	47	44	+3	56
10	Baskonia	38	13	13	12	53	56	−3	52
11	Laudio	38	12	13	13	31	31	0	49
12	Santurtzi	38	11	15	12	45	40	+5	48
13	Zalla	38	13	8	17	38	47	−9	47
14	Eibar B	38	12	10	16	46	57	−11	46
15	Arenas de Getxo	38	11	13	14	29	41	−12	46
16	Leoia	38	13	6	19	45	59	−14	45
17	Lagun Onak	38	11	10	17	33	42	−9	43
18	Aretxabaleta (R)	38	10	11	17	33	58	−25	41
19	Retuerto Sport (R)	38	5	11	22	31	74	−43	26
20	Salvatierra (R)	38	2	7	29	22	80	−58	13

(C) Champions; (P) Promoted; (R) Relegated

=== Group V - Catalonia ===
Pos	Team	Pld	W	D	L	GF	GA	GD	Pts
1	L'Hospitalet (C, P)	38	25	11	2	75	16	+59	86
2	Reus Deportiu	38	25	8	5	69	23	+46	83
3	Santboià (P)	38	20	10	8	68	46	+22	70
4	Prat	38	19	10	9	60	33	+27	67
5	Cornellà	38	16	13	9	43	41	+2	61
6	Manlleu	38	15	15	8	53	39	+14	60
7	Llagostera	38	15	11	12	58	42	+16	56
8	Europa	38	13	15	10	56	51	+5	54
9	Balaguer	38	13	13	12	55	48	+7	52
10	Amposta	38	13	13	12	58	60	−2	52
11	Castelldefels	38	13	8	17	52	62	−10	47
12	Palamós	38	13	7	18	42	55	−13	46
13	Pobla Mafumet	38	12	10	16	47	54	−7	46
14	Vilanova	38	12	10	16	50	54	−4	46
15	Cassà (Note: Cassà resigned from Tercera División at the end of the season and thus relegated to Preferente, so Premià was re-admitted to Tercera División.) (R)	38	11	11	16	50	61	−11	44
16	Benavent (Note: Benavent fused with Ascó after the end of the season)	38	11	10	17	48	69	−21	43
17	Premià	38	9	9	20	35	53	−18	36
18	Rapitenca (R)	38	9	7	22	46	71	−25	34
19	Blanes (R)	38	7	6	25	43	85	−42	27
20	Olesa (R)	38	5	11	22	30	75	−45	26

(C) Champions; (P) Promoted; (R) Relegated

=== Group VI - Valencian Community ===
Pos	Team	Pld	W	D	L	GF	GA	GD	Pts
1	Gandía (C, P)	38	20	9	9	51	28	+23	69
2	Alzira (P)	38	20	9	9	52	26	+26	69
3	Novelda	38	19	8	11	52	42	+10	65
4	Villarreal C	38	19	8	11	59	45	+14	65
5	Catarroja	38	17	10	11	43	38	+5	61
6	J.B. Cristo	38	16	12	10	42	24	+18	60
7	O. Xàtiva	38	15	15	8	51	34	+17	60
8	La Nucía	38	16	11	11	63	37	+26	59
9	Levante B	38	16	9	13	45	41	+4	57
10	Torrellano	38	15	11	12	43	41	+2	56
11	Crevillente	38	15	10	13	56	42	+14	55
12	Burjassot	38	13	10	15	43	56	−13	49
13	Ribarroja	38	12	13	13	30	33	−3	49
14	Jove Español	38	13	10	15	38	41	−3	49
15	Torrevieja	38	11	12	15	41	42	−1	45
16	Eldense	38	11	8	19	36	49	−13	41
17	Puçol	38	11	8	19	46	58	−12	41
18	Ilicitano (R)	38	10	4	24	42	93	−51	34
19	Onda (R)	38	8	7	23	30	56	−26	31
20	Alicante B (R)	38	8	6	24	19	56	−37	30

(C) Champions; (P) Promoted; (R) Relegated

=== Group VII - Community of Madrid ===
Pos	Team	Pld	W	D	L	GF	GA	GD	Pts
1	Rayo B (C, P)	38	25	10	3	68	23	+45	85
2	Parla	38	21	11	6	65	33	+32	74
3	Getafe B (P)	38	20	10	8	77	41	+36	70
4	Trival Valderas	38	21	6	11	77	45	+32	69
5	Fuenlabrada	38	20	8	10	52	33	+19	68
6	Real Madrid C	38	18	10	10	59	43	+16	64
7	Navalcarnero	38	17	6	15	49	48	+1	57
8	Móstoles	38	15	11	12	52	42	+10	56
9	Rayo Majadahonda	38	16	6	16	46	47	−1	54
10	Colmenar Viejo	38	16	5	17	53	54	−1	53
11	Atlético C	38	14	10	14	55	51	+4	52
12	S. Fernando Henares	38	14	8	16	42	58	−16	50
13	S.S. Reyes	38	14	8	16	57	57	0	50
14	Atl. Pinto	38	12	11	15	43	62	−19	47
15	Vallecas	38	12	10	16	46	51	−5	46
16	Alcobendas	38	10	13	15	46	53	−7	43
17	Arganda (R)	38	9	12	17	40	61	−21	39
18	Santa Ana (R)	38	8	6	24	38	73	−35	30
19	Ciempozuelos (R)	38	6	6	26	36	80	−44	24
20	Galáctico Pegaso (R)	38	6	5	27	27	73	−46	20 (Note: Galáctico Pegaso was docked 3 points due to their players' strike against S.S. Reyes)

(C) Champions; (P) Promoted; (R) Relegated

=== Group VIII - Castilla and León ===
Pos	Team	Pld	W	D	L	GF	GA	GD	Pts
1	Burgos (C)	38	27	9	2	62	18	+44	90
2	Valladolid B	38	26	7	5	85	26	+59	85
3	Arandina	38	20	12	6	60	25	+35	72
4	Ávila	38	19	12	7	58	36	+22	69
5	Huracán Z	38	19	11	8	64	35	+29	68
6	Villaralbo	38	17	12	9	61	33	+28	63
7	Bembibre	38	17	11	10	63	51	+12	62
8	Gimn. Segoviana	38	16	8	14	59	39	+20	56
9	Numancia B	38	15	5	18	45	56	−11	50
10	Íscar	38	14	7	17	50	60	−10	49
11	At. Astorga	38	14	7	17	45	60	−15	49
12	Almazán	38	13	7	18	41	49	−8	46
13	Lermeño	38	13	6	19	48	62	−14	45
14	Tordesillas	38	10	13	15	33	47	−14	43
15	Venta de Baños	38	12	6	20	33	75	−42	42
16	Santa Marta	38	10	8	20	40	64	−24	38
17	Aguilar	38	8	11	19	39	56	−17	35
18	Salmantino (R)	38	8	10	20	34	57	−23	34
19	La Granja (R)	38	7	7	24	39	65	−26	28
20	Cultural Leonesa B (R)	38	6	9	23	35	80	−45	27

(C) Champions; (R) Relegated

=== Group IX - Eastern Andalusia and Melilla ===
Pos	Team	Pld	W	D	L	GF	GA	GD	Pts
1	Atlético Mancha Real (C)	36	20	8	8	53	26	+27	68
2	Motril	36	18	12	6	54	24	+30	66
3	El Palo	36	19	6	11	59	44	+15	63
4	Almería B (Note: Almería B promoted to Segunda División B due to paying the 700,000€ debt which led to Atlético Ciudad's administrative dissolution.) (P)	36	17	10	9	62	37	+25	61
5	Ronda	36	17	9	10	64	51	+13	60
6	Atlético Malagueño	36	16	11	9	56	44	+12	59
7	Comarca Níjar	36	17	6	13	52	34	+18	57
8	Ciudad Vícar	36	13	14	9	52	48	+4	53
9	Loja	36	13	10	13	42	40	+2	49
10	Antequera	36	11	14	11	43	38	+5	47
11	Vélez	36	14	5	17	50	52	−2	47
12	Alhaurino	36	12	9	15	53	54	−1	45
13	Adra	36	12	9	15	47	59	−12	45
14	Santa Fe (Note: Santa Fe resigned from Tercera División at the end of the season and thus relegated to Preferente.) (R)	36	11	8	17	40	55	−15	41
15	Carboneras	36	10	8	18	43	63	−20	38
16	Huétor Tájar	36	11	5	20	44	67	−23	38
17	Baza	36	9	10	17	36	54	−18	37
18	Arenas de Armilla (R)	36	9	8	19	33	63	−30	35
19	Poli Ejido B (Note: Team withdrawn from the competition and consequently dissolved) (D)	19	7	3	9	21	22	−1	0
20	Vera (Note: Team withdrawn from the competition and consequently relegated to Primera Andaluza) (R)	19	1	7	11	17	46	−29	0

(C) Champions; (D) Dissolved; (P) Promoted; (R) Relegated

=== Group X - Western Andalusia and Ceuta ===
Pos	Team	Pld	W	D	L	GF	GA	GD	Pts
1	Alcalá (C, P)	38	23	11	4	68	21	+47	80
2	Mairena	38	21	7	10	54	30	+24	70
3	Ayamonte	38	19	12	7	63	33	+30	69
4	Marinaleda	38	19	9	10	52	33	+19	66
5	Linense	38	17	12	9	50	32	+18	63
6	Pozoblanco	38	17	11	10	44	33	+11	62
7	Los Barrios	38	16	9	13	42	41	+1	57
8	Recreativo B	38	15	11	12	61	47	+14	56
9	Córdoba B	38	13	16	9	38	37	+1	55
10	Cádiz B	38	14	12	12	42	41	+1	54
11	Los Palacios	38	15	8	15	40	45	−5	53
12	Coria	38	14	8	16	56	47	+9	50
13	Puerto Real	38	14	7	17	32	39	−7	49
14	Sevilla C	38	12	12	14	42	40	+2	48
15	Algeciras	38	11	13	14	48	53	−5	46
16	Atl. Sanluqueño	38	12	8	18	36	41	−5	44
17	Portuense	38	12	7	19	39	56	−17	43
18	Murallas Ceuta (R)	38	11	8	19	29	42	−13	41
19	Dos Hermanas (R)	38	4	7	27	24	92	−68	19
20	Cartaya (R)	38	4	6	28	25	82	−57	18

(C) Champions; (P) Promoted; (R) Relegated

=== Group XI - Balearic Islands ===
Pos	Team	Pld	W	D	L	GF	GA	GD	Pts
1	Atlético Baleares (C, P)	38	24	9	5	78	33	+45	81
2	Santa Eulàlia	38	22	12	4	62	18	+44	78
3	Constancia	38	22	8	8	79	37	+42	74
4	Ferriolense	38	19	9	10	55	38	+17	66
5	Binissalem	38	18	10	10	58	45	+13	64
6	Santanyí	38	18	9	11	74	36	+38	63
7	Alcúdia	38	16	11	11	60	46	+14	59
8	Mercadal	38	16	9	13	61	59	+2	57
9	Sant Rafel	38	14	13	11	36	36	0	55
10	Arenal	38	13	13	12	41	58	−17	52
11	Montuïri	38	12	15	11	48	51	−3	51
12	Ferreries	38	12	11	15	49	49	0	47
13	Alaior	38	13	8	17	54	61	−7	47
14	Llosetense	38	12	6	20	33	63	−30	42
15	Poblense	38	9	13	16	49	56	−7	40
16	Campos	38	10	10	18	44	57	−13	40
17	Collerense	38	10	7	21	52	71	−19	37
18	Independiente (R)	38	8	13	17	32	70	−38	37
19	Esporles (R)	38	6	9	23	29	68	−39	27
20	Atlètic Ciutadella (R)	38	5	7	26	27	69	−42	22

(C) Champions; (P) Promoted; (R) Relegated

=== Group XII - Canary Islands ===
Pos	Team	Pld	W	D	L	GF	GA	GD	Pts
1	Corralejo (C)	41	21	16	4	56	25	+31	79
2	Las Palmas At.	41	20	14	7	67	38	+29	74
3	Pájara Playas	41	21	11	9	58	44	+14	74
4	Marino	41	19	13	9	65	39	+26	70
5	Granadilla	41	19	11	11	55	48	+7	68
6	Mensajero	41	16	18	7	59	37	+22	66
7	Villa Sta. Brígida	41	15	15	11	42	29	+13	60
8	Realejos	41	15	11	15	45	43	+2	56
9	Huracán	41	14	14	13	43	40	+3	56
10	Tenisca	41	16	7	18	55	47	+8	55
11	Tijarafe	41	12	16	13	51	53	−2	52
12	Castillo (Note: Castillo resigned from Tercera División after the end of the season and thus relegated to Preferente) (R)	41	11	17	13	46	50	−4	50
13	Or. Marítima	41	12	14	15	44	54	−10	50
14	Teror	41	12	13	16	46	53	−7	49
15	Laguna	41	12	11	18	41	54	−13	47
16	Las Zocas	41	11	14	16	38	53	−15	47
17	Victoria	41	10	17	14	37	44	−7	47
18	Charco del Pino (R)	41	10	16	15	39	50	−11	46
19	Gáldar (R)	41	9	13	19	34	62	−28	40
20	Los Llanos (R)	41	7	15	19	33	58	−25	36
21	Universidad B (R)	41	7	11	23	44	73	−29	32
22	Fuerteventura (Note: Team withdrawn from the competition and consequently dissolved) (D)	21	5	7	9	23	40	−17	22

(C) Champions; (D) Dissolved; (R) Relegated

=== Group XIII - Region of Murcia ===
Pos	Team	Pld	W	D	L	GF	GA	GD	Pts
1	Jumilla (Note: Jumilla promoted to Segunda División B due to Murcia B's forced relegation to Tercera División.) (C, P)	38	27	5	6	84	26	+58	86
2	Yeclano (P)	38	26	6	6	93	38	+55	84
3	Lorca Deportiva	38	26	6	6	95	36	+59	84
4	Costa Cálida	38	26	5	7	82	38	+44	83
5	Cartagena-La Unión	38	25	6	7	84	40	+44	81
6	Pinatar	38	24	8	6	68	28	+40	80
7	Cieza	38	24	8	6	81	33	+48	80
8	Atl. Pulpileño	38	15	7	16	61	56	+5	52
9	Plus Ultra	38	14	10	14	59	56	+3	52
10	Santomera	38	12	13	13	52	45	+7	49
11	Puente Tocinos	38	14	6	18	48	57	−9	48
12	Edeco Fortuna	38	13	8	17	50	73	−23	47
13	Cartagena	38	11	10	17	59	55	+4	43
14	Beniel	38	12	6	20	54	71	−17	42
15	Calasparra	38	9	9	20	44	70	−26	36
16	Abarán	38	8	7	23	26	81	−55	31
17	Bala Azul	38	7	9	22	47	76	−29	30
18	Mazarrón (R)	38	7	7	24	40	69	−29	28
19	Lumbreras (R)	38	5	3	30	28	127	−99	18
20	Cuarto Distrito (R)	38	3	5	30	31	111	−80	14

(C) Champions; (P) Promoted; (R) Relegated

=== Group XIV - Extremadura ===
Pos	Team	Pld	W	D	L	GF	GA	GD	Pts
1	Badajoz (C, P)	38	32	5	1	108	18	+90	101
2	Jerez	38	27	8	3	77	14	+63	89
3	Extremadura (P)	38	24	7	7	77	26	+51	79
4	Arroyo	38	22	8	8	72	43	+29	74
5	Mérida	38	21	9	8	56	28	+28	72
6	Sp. Villanueva	38	18	13	7	71	50	+21	67
7	Ciudad Plasencia	38	16	9	13	54	49	+5	57
8	Don Benito	38	15	8	15	48	50	−2	53
9	Sanvicenteño	38	13	12	13	47	49	−2	51
10	Imperio	38	11	14	13	59	56	+3	47
11	Olivenza	38	12	11	15	34	45	−11	47
12	Miajadas	38	12	8	18	28	42	−14	44
13	UD Badajoz	38	12	7	19	54	68	−14	43
14	Moralo	38	12	7	19	40	52	−12	43
15	Valdelacalzada	38	9	13	16	35	54	−19	40
16	Coria	38	8	10	20	50	76	−26	34
17	Santa Marta	38	8	7	23	43	70	−27	31
18	Montehermoso (R)	38	8	6	24	31	79	−48	30
19	La Estrella (R)	38	6	9	23	27	84	−57	27
20	Villafranca (R)	38	6	5	27	30	87	−57	23

(C) Champions; (P) Promoted; (R) Relegated

=== Group XV - Navarra ===
Pos	Team	Pld	W	D	L	GF	GA	GD	Pts
1	Tudelano (C)	38	27	8	3	87	29	+58	89
2	Peña Sport (P)	38	25	7	6	87	27	+60	82
3	Cirbonero	38	21	8	9	57	38	+19	71
4	Iruña	38	19	12	7	58	35	+23	69
5	Mutilvera	38	18	11	9	69	46	+23	65
6	San Juan	38	14	16	8	50	36	+14	58
7	Valle de Egüés	38	15	12	11	51	43	+8	57
8	Chantrea	38	14	10	14	40	38	+2	52
9	Lourdes	38	14	10	14	67	64	+3	52
10	Oberena	38	13	10	15	62	49	+13	49
11	Pamplona	38	12	12	14	33	45	−12	48
12	Aoiz	38	11	15	12	35	39	−4	48
13	Aluvión	38	12	8	18	44	61	−17	44
14	River Ega	38	10	11	17	33	38	−5	41
15	Peña Azagresa	38	11	8	19	44	61	−17	41
16	Murchante	38	10	10	18	29	49	−20	40
17	Huarte	38	10	9	19	38	59	−21	39
18	Valtierrano (R)	38	10	6	22	34	91	−57	36
19	Zarramonza (R)	38	8	10	20	28	58	−30	34
20	Cortes (R)	38	4	11	23	25	65	−40	23

(C) Champions; (P) Promoted; (R) Relegated

=== Group XVI - La Rioja ===
Pos	Team	Pld	W	D	L	GF	GA	GD	Pts
1	Oyonesa (C)	38	27	9	2	76	15	+61	90
2	Alfaro	38	28	5	5	111	22	+89	89
3	Haro	38	28	4	6	91	22	+69	88
4	Anguiano	38	25	8	5	96	37	+59	83
5	Calahorra	38	25	5	8	93	30	+63	80
6	Náxara	38	22	9	7	68	28	+40	75
7	River Ebro	38	20	8	10	67	32	+35	68
8	Arnedo	38	18	7	13	65	49	+16	61
9	Agoncillo	38	17	6	15	60	66	−6	57
10	San Marcial	38	15	9	14	64	51	+13	54
11	Calasancio	38	13	9	16	35	54	−19	48
12	Vianés	38	11	8	19	54	73	−19	41
13	Berceo	38	9	8	21	32	67	−35	35
14	Pradejón	38	9	7	22	36	74	−38	34
15	AF Calahorra	38	9	6	23	38	92	−54	33
16	Aldeano	38	10	2	26	38	86	−48	32
17	Cenicero	38	8	7	23	29	69	−40	31
18	Villegas (R)	38	8	7	23	35	93	−58	31
19	Yagüe (R)	38	6	5	27	36	90	−54	23
20	Alberite (R)	38	5	5	28	27	101	−74	20

(C) Champions; (R) Relegated

=== Group XVII - Aragón ===
Pos	Team	Pld	W	D	L	GF	GA	GD	Pts
1	Teruel (C, P)	38	30	4	4	88	29	+59	94
2	La Muela (P)	38	28	6	4	73	24	+49	90
3	Real Zaragoza B	38	27	3	8	96	33	+63	84
4	Ejea	38	27	3	8	104	35	+69	84
5	Monzón	38	25	6	7	77	42	+35	81
6	Andorra	38	25	4	9	79	38	+41	79
7	Sabiñánigo	38	15	7	16	53	60	−7	52
8	Villanueva	38	13	9	16	63	63	0	48
9	Utebo	38	13	9	16	57	64	−7	48
10	Valdefierro	38	14	4	20	46	63	−17	46
11	Giner Torrero	38	13	5	20	44	78	−34	44
12	Sariñena	38	11	10	17	36	61	−25	43
13	Barbastro	38	12	5	21	41	72	−31	41
14	Tauste	38	11	6	21	43	61	−18	39
15	Calatayud	38	9	11	18	46	56	−10	38
16	Mallén	38	10	5	23	37	58	−21	35
17	Cuarte Industrial (R)	38	9	8	21	40	75	−35	35
18	Alcañiz (R)	38	9	7	22	55	86	−31	34
19	Fraga (R)	38	10	4	24	47	87	−40	34
20	Jacetano (R)	38	8	6	24	34	74	−40	30

(C) Champions; (P) Promoted; (R) Relegated

=== Group XVIII - Castilla-La Mancha ===
Pos	Team	Pld	W	D	L	GF	GA	GD	Pts
1	La Roda (C)	38	23	8	7	71	32	+39	77
2	Illescas	38	18	14	6	58	40	+18	68
3	Azuqueca	38	18	11	9	71	52	+19	65
4	Talavera (Note: Talavera was dissolved after the end of the season, so Tomelloso was re-admitted to Tercera División.) (D)	38	17	11	10	46	30	+16	62
5	Albacete B	38	17	8	13	52	42	+10	59
6	Villarrobledo	38	15	13	10	47	41	+6	58
7	Torrijos	38	16	7	15	46	48	−2	55
8	Marchamalo	38	15	6	17	50	50	0	51
9	U. Criptanense	38	13	11	14	43	50	−7	50
10	Carranque	38	13	10	15	50	53	−3	49
11	Almansa	38	12	13	13	37	41	−4	49
12	Hellín	38	12	12	14	38	39	−1	48
13	La Gineta	38	12	12	14	40	46	−6	48
14	Piedrabuena	38	12	12	14	46	59	−13	48
15	Quintanar del Rey	38	13	8	17	48	57	−9	47
16	Socuéllamos	38	12	11	15	42	59	−17	47
17	Tomelloso	38	11	12	15	40	41	−1	45
18	Alcázar (R)	38	11	10	17	43	49	−6	43
19	Mora (R)	38	12	5	21	39	50	−11	41
20	Daimiel (R)	38	7	8	23	29	57	−28	29

(C) Champions; (D) Dissolved; (R) Relegated

== Promotion play-offs ==
=== Group winners promotion play-off ===
Promoted to Segunda División B: Deportivo B, Gandía, Atlético Baleares, Alcalá, Real Sociedad B, Teruel, Badajoz, Caudal and Rayo B.

=== Non-champions promotion play-off ===
Promoted to Segunda División B: Getafe B, Yeclano, Coruxo, Santboià, La Muela, Alzira, Peña Sport, Extremadura and L'Hospitalet.
