= Olivenza CP =

Spanish football club

Olivenza
- Full name: Olivenza Club Polideportivo
- Founded: 28 November 1950 (as CD Olivenza); 1963 (refounded as CF Olivenza); 1975 (refounded as Olivenza FC); 10 August 1978 (merged with Atlético Oliventino)
- Dissolved: 2011
- Ground: Ciudad Deportiva, Olivenza, Extremadura, Spain
- Capacity: 5,000
- 2010–11: 3ª – Group 14, 19th
Home colours	Away colours

Olivenza Club Polideportivo was a football team based in Olivenza in the autonomous community of Extremadura. Founded in 1950, its final season was in the 2010–11 Tercera División.

== History ==
Founded on 28 November 1950 as Club Deportivo Olivenza, the club played for three seasons in the Tercera Regional before only disappearing officially in 1963. Shortly after, the club was refounded as Club de Fútbol Olivenza, and first reached the Tercera División in 1966.

CF Olivenza retired from the Primera Regional midway through the 1973–74 season, and the city remained without a club for more than a year until the creation of Olivenza Fútbol Club in 1975. The club later coincided with Club Atlético Oliventino in the 1976–77 and 1977–78 campaigns, as both played in the Primera Regional, until a merger between both sides occurred on 10 August 1978, to create Olivenza Club Polideportivo.

Olivenza CP disbanded due to limited financial resources in 2011, and Olivenza FC was founded as an heir to the club.

== Season to season ==
=== CD Olivenza (1950–1963) ===
Season	Tier	Division	Place	Copa del Rey
1950–51	6	3ª Reg.	6th	
1951–52	6	3ª Reg.	1st	
1952–53	6	3ª Reg.	3rd	

=== CF Olivenza (1963–1974) ===
Season	Tier	Division	Place	Copa del Rey
1963–64	6	3ª Reg.	3rd	
1964–65	7	4ª Reg.	3rd	
1965–66	4	1ª Reg.	1st	
1966–67	3	3ª	17th	
1967–68	3	3ª	16th	
1968–69	4	1ª Reg.	1st	
1969–70	3	3ª	20th	
1970–71	4	1ª Reg.	13th	
1971–72	4	1ª Reg.	14th	
1972–73	4	1ª Reg.	14th	
1973–74	4	1ª Reg.	(R)	

- 3 seasons in Tercera División

=== Olivenza FC (1975–1978) ===
Season	Tier	Division	Place	Copa del Rey
1975–76	5	1ª Reg.	12th	
1976–77	5	1ª Reg.	11th	
1977–78	6	1ª Reg.	8th	

=== Atlético Oliventino (1976–1978) ===
Season	Tier	Division	Place	Copa del Rey
1976–77	5	1ª Reg.	8th	
1977–78	6	1ª Reg.	10th	

=== Olivenza CP (1978–2011) ===
Season	Tier	Division	Place	Copa del Rey
1978–79	6	1ª Reg.	2nd	
1979–80	5	Reg. Pref.	3rd	
1980–81	5	Reg. Pref.	3rd	
1981–82	5	Reg. Pref.	4th	
1982–83	5	Reg. Pref.	3rd	
1983–84	4	3ª	13th	
1984–85	4	3ª	16th	
1985–86	4	3ª	17th	
1986–87	5	Reg. Pref.	4th	
1987–88	5	Reg. Pref.	6th	
1988–89	5	Reg. Pref.	17th	
1989–90	5	Reg. Pref.	5th	
1990–91	5	Reg. Pref.	5th	
1991–92	5	Reg. Pref.	5th	
1992–93	5	Reg. Pref.	12th	
1993–94	5	Reg. Pref.	5th	
1994–95	5	Reg. Pref.	1st	

Season	Tier	Division	Place	Copa del Rey
1995–96	4	3ª	13th	
1996–97	4	3ª	13th	
1997–98	4	3ª	12th	
1998–99	4	3ª	14th	
1999–2000	4	3ª	18th	
2000–01	5	Reg. Pref.	5th	
2001–02	5	Reg. Pref.	2nd	
2002–03	4	3ª	19th	
2003–04	5	Reg. Pref.	2nd	
2004–05	4	3ª	15th	
2005–06	4	3ª	16th	
2006–07	4	3ª	16th	
2007–08	4	3ª	13th	
2008–09	4	3ª	9th	
2009–10	4	3ª	11th	
2010–11	4	3ª	19th	

- 16 seasons in Tercera División
