= CD Murchante =

Association football club in Spain

Murchante
- Full name: Club Deportivo Murchante
- Founded: 1933
- Ground: San Roque, Murchante, Navarre, Spain
- Capacity: 1,400
- Chairman: (Spain) Álvaro Echegoyen
- Manager: (Spain) Rubén López "Poño"
- League: Primera Regional – Group 1
- 2024–25: Regional Preferente – Group 2, 15th of 16 (relegated)
Home colours	Away colours

Club Deportivo Murchante is a Spanish football team based in Murchante in the autonomous community of Navarre. Founded in 1933, it plays in Primera Regional – Group 1. Its stadium is Estadio San Roque with a capacity of 1,400 seaters.

== Season to season ==
Logo used until 2004

Season	Tier	Division	Place	Copa del Rey
1949–50	5	2ª Reg.	8th	
1950–1965	DNP			
1965–66	5	2ª Reg.	2nd	
1966–67	5	2ª Reg.	5th	
1967–68	5	2ª Reg.	8th	
1968–1975	DNP			
1975–76	6	2ª Reg.	9th	
1976–77	6	2ª Reg.	2nd	
1977–78	6	1ª Reg.	1st	
1978–79	5	Reg. Pref.	15th	
1979–80	5	Reg. Pref.	7th	
1980–81	5	Reg. Pref.	6th	
1981–82	5	Reg. Pref.	4th	
1982–83	5	Reg. Pref.	13th	
1983–84	5	Reg. Pref.	4th	
1984–85	5	Reg. Pref.	3rd	
1985–86	5	Reg. Pref.	13th	
1986–87	5	Reg. Pref.	16th	
1987–88	5	Reg. Pref.	12th	
1988–89	5	Reg. Pref.	16th	

Season	Tier	Division	Place	Copa del Rey
1989–90	5	Reg. Pref.	20th	
1990–91	6	1ª Reg.	8th	
1991–92	6	1ª Reg.	10th	
1992–93	6	1ª Reg.	11th	
1993–94	6	1ª Reg.	4th	
1994–95	6	1ª Reg.	1st	
1995–96	5	Reg. Pref.	5th	
1996–97	5	Reg. Pref.	2nd	
1997–98	4	3ª	14th	
1998–99	4	3ª	19th	
1999–2000	5	Reg. Pref.	5th	
2000–01	5	Reg. Pref.	6th	
2001–02	5	Reg. Pref.	4th	
2002–03	5	Reg. Pref.	3rd	
2003–04	4	3ª	18th	
2004–05	4	3ª	5th	
2005–06	4	3ª	12th	
2006–07	4	3ª	12th	
2007–08	4	3ª	8th	
2008–09	4	3ª	17th	

Season	Tier	Division	Place	Copa del Rey
2009–10	4	3ª	16th	
2010–11	4	3ª	12th	
2011–12	4	3ª	7th	
2012–13	4	3ª	9th	
2013–14	4	3ª	18th	
2014–15	5	Reg. Pref.	7th	
2015–16	5	1ª Aut.	17th	
2016–17	6	Reg. Pref.	5th	
2017–18	6	Reg. Pref.	3rd	
2018–19	5	1ª Aut.	3rd	
2019–20	4	3ª	14th	
2020–21	4	3ª	6th / 6th	
2021–22	5	3ª RFEF	13th	
2022–23	6	1ª Aut.	6th	
2023–24	6	1ª Aut.	18th	
2024–25	7	Reg. Pref.	15th	
2025–26	8	1ª Reg.		

- 15 seasons in Tercera División
- 1 season in Tercera División RFEF
