= CD Mendi =

Spanish football team

Mendi
- Full name: Club Deportivo Mendi
- Founded: 2002
- Ground: El Pontarrón, Mendigorria, Navarre, Spain
- Capacity: 1,500
- Chairman: (Spain) Gabriel El Cid
- Manager: (Spain) Ángel Alcalde
- League: Regional Preferente – Group 1
- 2024–25: Regional Preferente – Group 1, 10th of 16
Home colours	Away colours

Club Deportivo Mendi is a Spanish football team based in Mendigorria in the autonomous community of Navarre. Founded in 2002, it plays in Regional Preferente – Group 1. Its stadium is Estadio El Pontarrón with a capacity of 1,500 seaters.

== Season to season ==
Season	Tier	Division	Place	Copa del Rey
2002–03	6	1ª Reg.	8th	
2003–04	6	1ª Reg.	3rd	
2004–05	5	Reg. Pref.	15th	
2005–06	6	1ª Reg.	1st	
2006–07	5	Reg. Pref.	7th	
2007–08	5	Reg. Pref.	2nd	
2008–09	4	3ª	21st	
2009–10	5	Reg. Pref.	6th	
2010–11	5	Reg. Pref.	12th	
2011–12	5	Reg. Pref.	5th	
2012–13	5	Reg. Pref.	11th	
2013–14	5	Reg. Pref.	2nd	
2014–15	5	Reg. Pref.	1st	
2015–16	4	3ª	20th	
2016–17	5	1ª Aut.	13th	
2017–18	5	1ª Aut.	10th	
2018–19	5	1ª Aut.	6th	
2019–20	5	1ª Aut.	13th	
2020–21	5	1ª Aut.	4th	
2021–22	6	1ª Aut.	6th	

Season	Tier	Division	Place	Copa del Rey
2022–23	6	1ª Aut.	7th	
2023–24	7	Reg. Pref.	10th	
2024–25	7	Reg. Pref.	10th	
2025–26	7	Reg. Pref.		

- 2 seasons in Tercera División
