= CD Lourdes =

Association football club in Spain

Lourdes
- Full name: Club Deportivo Lourdes
- Founded: 1978
- Ground: Luis Asarta, Tudela, Navarre, Spain
- Capacity: 1,000
- Chairman: (Spain) Santos Sánchez
- Manager: (Spain) Hugo Herrera
- League: Primera Autonómica
- 2024–25: Primera Autonómica, 4th of 18
| Home colours | Away colours |

Club Deportivo Lourdes is a Spanish football team based in Tudela, in the autonomous community of Navarre. Founded in 1978, it plays in Primera Autonómica, holding home games at Campo de Fútbol Luis Asarta, with a capacity of 1,000 seats.

== Season to season ==
| Season | Tier | Division | Place | Copa del Rey |
|---|---|---|---|---|
| 1980–81 | 7 | 2ª Reg. | 4th | |
| 1981–82 | 6 | 1ª Reg. | 16th | |
| 1982–83 | 7 | 2ª Reg. | 10th | |
| 1983–84 | 7 | 2ª Reg. | 8th | |
| 1984–85 | 7 | 2ª Reg. | 4th | |
| 1985–86 | 7 | 2ª Reg. | 4th | |
| 1986–87 | 6 | 1ª Reg. | 14th | |
| 1987–88 | 6 | 1ª Reg. | 16th | |
| 1988–89 | 6 | 1ª Reg. | 15th | |
| 1989–1993 | DNP | | | |
| 1993–94 | 6 | 1ª Reg. | 5th | |
| 1994–95 | 6 | 1ª Reg. | 2nd | |
| 1995–96 | 5 | Reg. Pref. | 11th | |
| 1996–97 | 5 | Reg. Pref. | 11th | |
| 1997–98 | 5 | Reg. Pref. | 7th | |
| 1998–99 | 5 | Reg. Pref. | 4th | |
| 1999–2000 | 5 | Reg. Pref. | 4th | |
| 2000–01 | 5 | Reg. Pref. | 10th | |
| 2001–02 | 5 | Reg. Pref. | 2nd | |
| 2002–03 | 4 | 3ª | 14th | |

| Season | Tier | Division | Place | Copa del Rey |
|---|---|---|---|---|
| 2003–04 | 4 | 3ª | 19th | |
| 2004–05 | 5 | Reg. Pref. | 1st | |
| 2005–06 | 4 | 3ª | 14th | |
| 2006–07 | 4 | 3ª | 17th | |
| 2007–08 | 4 | 3ª | 10th | |
| 2008–09 | 4 | 3ª | 10th | |
| 2009–10 | 4 | 3ª | 9th | |
| 2010–11 | 4 | 3ª | 9th | |
| 2011–12 | 4 | 3ª | 18th | |
| 2012–13 | 5 | Reg. Pref. | 5th | |
| 2013–14 | 5 | Reg. Pref. | 8th | |
| 2014–15 | 5 | Reg. Pref. | 3rd | |
| 2015–16 | 5 | 1ª Aut. | 1st | |
| 2016–17 | 4 | 3ª | 18th | |
| 2017–18 | 5 | 1ª Aut. | 6th | |
| 2018–19 | 5 | 1ª Aut. | 5th | |
| 2019–20 | 4 | 3ª | 15th | |
| 2020–21 | 4 | 3ª | 10th / 9th | |
| 2021–22 | 6 | 1ª Aut. | 6th | |
| 2022–23 | 6 | 1ª Aut. | 11th | |

| Season | Tier | Division | Place | Copa del Rey |
|---|---|---|---|---|
| 2023–24 | 7 | Reg. Pref. | 2nd | |
| 2024–25 | 6 | 1ª Aut. | 4th | |
| 2025–26 | 6 | 1ª Aut. | | |

- 10 seasons in Tercera División

== Notable former players ==
- (Spain) Francisco Jusué
- (Spain) Mikel Arce
