= Olivenza FC =

Association football club in Spain

- Full name: Olivenza Fútbol Club
- Founded: 2011
- Dissolved: 2025
- Ground: Ciudad Deportiva Ramón Rocha Maqueda, Extremadura, Spain
- Capacity: 5,000
- President: (Spain) José Silva
- Head coach: (Spain) Jesús Acedo (Chuno)
- 2024–25: Tercera Federación – Group 14, 18th of 18 (relegated)
Home colours

Olivenza Fútbol Club was a Spanish football team located in the town of Olivenza in the province of Badajoz, autonomous community of Extremadura. Founded in 2011, they were dissolved in 2025, and held home matches at Ciudad Deportiva Ramón Rocha Maqueda, with a capacity of 5,000 spectators.

== History ==
The club was founded in 2011, as a replacement to dissolved CP Olivenza. In July 2025, after suffering relegation from Tercera Federación, the club was dissolved

== Season to season ==
| Season | Tier | Division | Place | Copa del Rey |
|---|---|---|---|---|
| 2011–12 | 6 | 1ª Reg. | 1st | |
| 2012–13 | 5 | Reg. Pref. | 3rd | |
| 2013–14 | 4 | 3ª | 13th | |
| 2014–15 | 4 | 3ª | 14th | |
| 2015–16 | 4 | 3ª | 16th | |
| 2016–17 | 4 | 3ª | 10th | |
| 2017–18 | 4 | 3ª | 14th | |

| Season | Tier | Division | Place | Copa del Rey |
|---|---|---|---|---|
| 2018–19 | 4 | 3ª | 12th | |
| 2019–20 | 4 | 3ª | 12th | |
| 2020–21 | 4 | 3ª | 10th / 1st | |
| 2021–22 | 5 | 3ª RFEF | 11th | |
| 2022–23 | 5 | 3ª Fed. | 4th | |
| 2023–24 | 5 | 3ª Fed. | 12th | |
| 2024–25 | 5 | 3ª Fed. | 18th | |

- 8 seasons in Tercera División
- 4 seasons in Tercera Federación/Tercera División RFEF
