= CD Iruña =

Spanish football team

Iruña
- Full name: Club Deportivo Iruña
- Founded: 1939
- Ground: Orkoien, Pamplona, Navarre, Spain
- Capacity: 2,500
- President: (Spain) Manuel Larumbe
- Head coach: (Spain) David Acaz Martínez
- League: Regional Preferente – Group 1
- 2024–25: Primera Autonómica, 16th of 18 (relegated)
Home colours	Away colours

Club Deportivo Iruña is a Spanish football team based in Pamplona, in the autonomous community of Navarre. Founded in 1939, it plays in Regional Preferente – Group 1, holding home matches at Estadio Paternain, with a capacity of 3,000 seats. The club is named after the Basque language name of Pamplona.

CD Iruña has also a women's volleyball team which plays since 2012 in Superliga Femenina de Voleibol.

== History ==
In June 2016, Iruña signed an agreement with CA Osasuna to become its second reserve team during the next five seasons. The Iruña team had to play at least one division below the main reserve team Osasuna B (Promesas), and neither reserve team could enter the Copa del Rey.

In the 2017–18 Tercera División season, Iruña finished 3rd which would normally permit entry to the promotion playoffs; however, Osasuna B were relegated from Segunda B, and due to the hierarchy rules, Iruña were instead demoted to the Primera Autonómica de Navarra for the coming campaign, bringing to an end a 15-year sequence of maintaining their status at the same level.

In the summer of 2020, with Iruña having been unable to climb back up from the regional level, their affiliation with Osasuna was ended (though they would remain a local partner club) and a new arrangement was made with CD Subiza to act as the feeder to the professional club's B-team.

== Season to season ==
Season	Tier	Division	Place	Copa del Rey
1943–44	4	2ª Reg.	2nd	
1944–45	4	1ª Reg.	6th	
1945–46	4	1ª Reg.	6th	
1946–47	4	1ª Reg.	2nd	
1947–48	4	1ª Reg.	9th	
1948–49	4	1ª Reg.	8th	
1949–50	4	1ª Reg.	4th	
1950–51	4	1ª Reg.	5th	
1951–52	4	1ª Reg.	7th	
1952–53	4	1ª Reg.	5th	
1953–54	4	1ª Reg.	11th	
1954–55	4	1ª Reg.	3rd	
1955–56	4	1ª Reg.	1st	
1956–57	3	3ª	8th	
1957–58	3	3ª	12th	
1958–59	3	3ª	8th	
1959–60	3	3ª	13th	
1960–61	3	3ª	8th	
1961–62	3	3ª	8th	
1962–63	3	3ª	10th	

Season	Tier	Division	Place	Copa del Rey
1963–64	3	3ª	16th	
1964–65	4	1ª Reg.	2nd	
1965–66	4	1ª Reg.	1st	
1966–67	3	3ª	16th	
1967–68	4	1ª Reg.	8th	
1968–69	4	1ª Reg.	1st	
1969–70	3	3ª	10th	First round
1970–71	4	1ª Reg.	7th	
1971–72	4	1ª Reg.	19th	
1972–73	5	2ª Reg.	1st	
1973–74	4	1ª Reg.	11th	
1974–75	4	Reg. Pref.	13th	
1975–76	4	Reg. Pref.	14th	
1976–77	4	Reg. Pref.	15th	
1977–78	5	Reg. Pref.	3rd	
1978–79	5	Reg. Pref.	7th	
1979–80	5	Reg. Pref.	6th	
1980–81	5	Reg. Pref.	12th	
1981–82	5	Reg. Pref.	9th	
1982–83	5	Reg. Pref.	12th	

Season	Tier	Division	Place	Copa del Rey
1983–84	5	Reg. Pref.	2nd	
1984–85	5	Reg. Pref.	10th	
1985–86	5	Reg. Pref.	2nd	
1986–87	4	3ª	18th	
1987–88	4	3ª	17th	
1988–89	4	3ª	20th	
1989–90	5	Reg. Pref.	3rd	
1990–91	5	Reg. Pref.	20th	
1991–92	6	1ª Reg.	1st	
1992–93	5	Reg. Pref.	5th	
1993–94	5	Reg. Pref.	5th	
1994–95	5	Reg. Pref.	8th	
1995–96	5	Reg. Pref.	17th	
1996–97	6	1ª Reg.	1st	
1997–98	5	Reg. Pref.	5th	
1998–99	5	Reg. Pref.	7th	
1999–2000	5	Reg. Pref.	12th	
2000–01	5	Reg. Pref.	13th	
2001–02	5	Reg. Pref.	7th	
2002–03	5	Reg. Pref.	1st	

Season	Tier	Division	Place	Copa del Rey
2003–04	4	3ª	7th	
2004–05	4	3ª	4th	
2005–06	4	3ª	2nd	
2006–07	4	3ª	13th	
2007–08	4	3ª	3rd	
2008–09	4	3ª	6th	
2009–10	4	3ª	4th	
2010–11	4	3ª	6th	
2011–12	4	3ª	9th	
2012–13	4	3ª	3rd	
2013–14	4	3ª	9th	
2014–15	4	3ª	10th	
2015–16	4	3ª	14th	
2016–17	4	3ª	2nd	N/A (Note: Second reserve team of Osasuna.)
2017–18	4	3ª	3rd (Note: As Osasuna B were relegated from the Segunda División B, Iruña were not allowed to participate in promotion play-offs and obligated to move down to the level below.)	N/A
2018–19	5	1ª Aut.	14th	N/A
2019–20	5	1ª Aut.	6th	N/A
2020–21	5	1ª Aut.	5th	
2021–22	6	1ª Aut.	3rd	
2022–23	6	1ª Aut.	4th	

Season	Tier	Division	Place	Copa del Rey
2023–24	6	1ª Aut.	11th	
2024–25	6	1ª Aut.	16th	
2025–26	7	Reg. Pref.		

- 28 seasons in Tercera División
