= Oteiza =

Village and municipality of Spain

Coordinates: 42°37′7″N 1°57′12″W

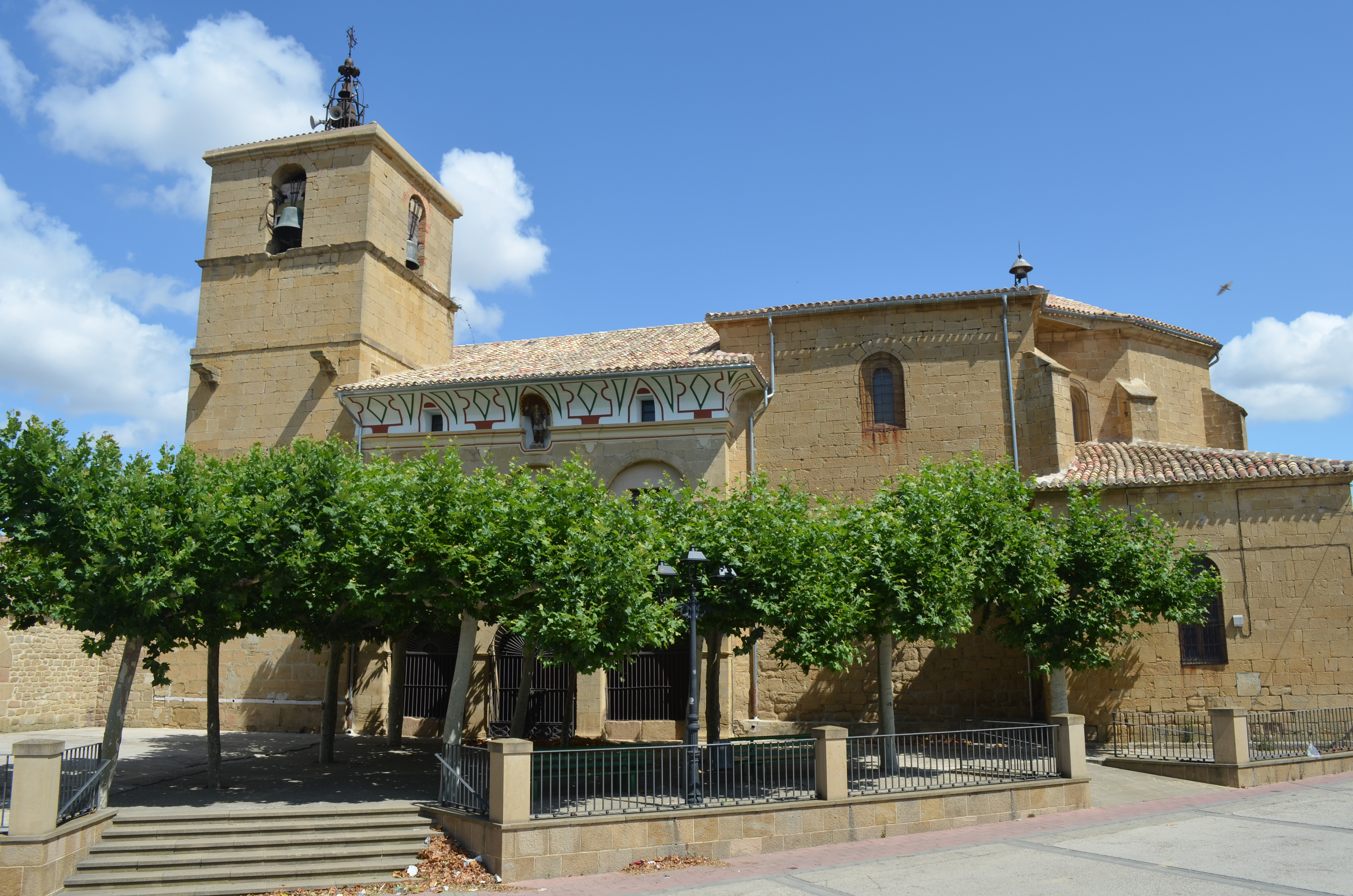

Oteiza or Oteiza de la Solana (Oteitza in Basque), is a village and a Spanish municipality of the Foral Community of Navarra, located in the merindad of Estella, in the Estella Oriental region, 51 km from the capital of the community, Pamplona. Its population in 2016 was 939 (INE ).

== Toponymy ==
Formerly Basque was spoken in this municipality, hence its name "Oteitza" which is related to ote or ota which means argoma (heather) in Basque. Initially attached to the non-Basque-speaking zone by the Foral Law 18/1986, in June 2017 the Navarrese Parliament approved the passage from Oteiza to the Mixed Zone of Navarre through the Provincial Law 9/2017.

Inhabitants are known as Oteizano or Oteizana. They are credited with the nickname of "whalers".

== Geography ==
Oteiza is located 51 km southwest of Pamplona and 10 km southeast of Estella, on a hill at 512 meters above sea level. The territory is flat, standing out a series of hills: Santa Bárbara (581 m), San Bartolomé (520 m) and San Marcos high (492 and 507 m).

=== Neighboring localities ===
- North: Villatuerta
- South: Lerín
- East: Mendigorría, Larraga, Villatuerta
- West: Allo, Dicastillo, Morentin, Aberin (with the first two and part of the third the River Ega serves as frontier)

== History ==
Within its boundaries is located the archaeological settlement of Turtumendia and Florín. There is also news of the discovery of a series of Roman inscriptions, one of whose texts refers to bandits in the area. A Roman military comes from the vicinity of the hermitage of San Tirso.

King Sancho de Peñalén donated in 1074 to the monastery of Irache the rents of his miserlings in the place and rights over his church of San Salvador. Two years later, the abbot of Irache received a swap in the village in exchange for that of San Juan de la Peña .

The nobleman García Almoravid enjoyed rents from collazos of the location until they were confiscated by the Crown after the War of the Navarrería (1276–1278), at which time they amounted to 65 salaries, 13 cahices and a half of wheat and as many barley. In turn, Irache continued to perceive in the village the pecha of his farmers, with whom he sustained a lawsuit that was sentenced in 1315. In that same century the claustría of the cathedral of Pamplona owned inheritances in its term. King Juan II of Aragón weakened in 1456 to his neighbors of the pecha that owed to the Crown by the services rendered in the civil war.

Oteiza had 458 inhabitants in 1786, and 1,042 in 1857. Its parochial church was dedicated to San Miguel after incorporating in 1736 the consecrated one to San Salvador.

In 1921, Oteiza was already included in La Solana, although in the late Middle Ages it was linked within the villas of the Estellea Ribera. During the Modern Age and until 1845 it was again in the valley, but with its peculiar condition as a village. That year happened to be municipality of common regime and shortly after (in 1852) Baigorri happened to be jurisdiction of Oteiza.

It had two parishes until 1736 when, because it was threatened to be financially ruined. These were the churches of El Salvador and San Miguel, which the first was added to the San Miguel parish. In 1802, there was a parish priest and four beneficiaries; the first was presented by the neighbors, and the other four by the parish priest or the king, according to the month in which they vacated.

In 1847, it had two schools: one for children, frequented by about 40 and endowed with two thousand reais, and the other for girls, to which many others used to go. At that time, a flour mill was operating in Oteiza.

In 1885, there was evidence of the existence of a hospital in the Barrio de la Plaza, which was maintained by alms.

In the 1920s, there was an oil mill running and Oteiza also had a soft drinks factory.

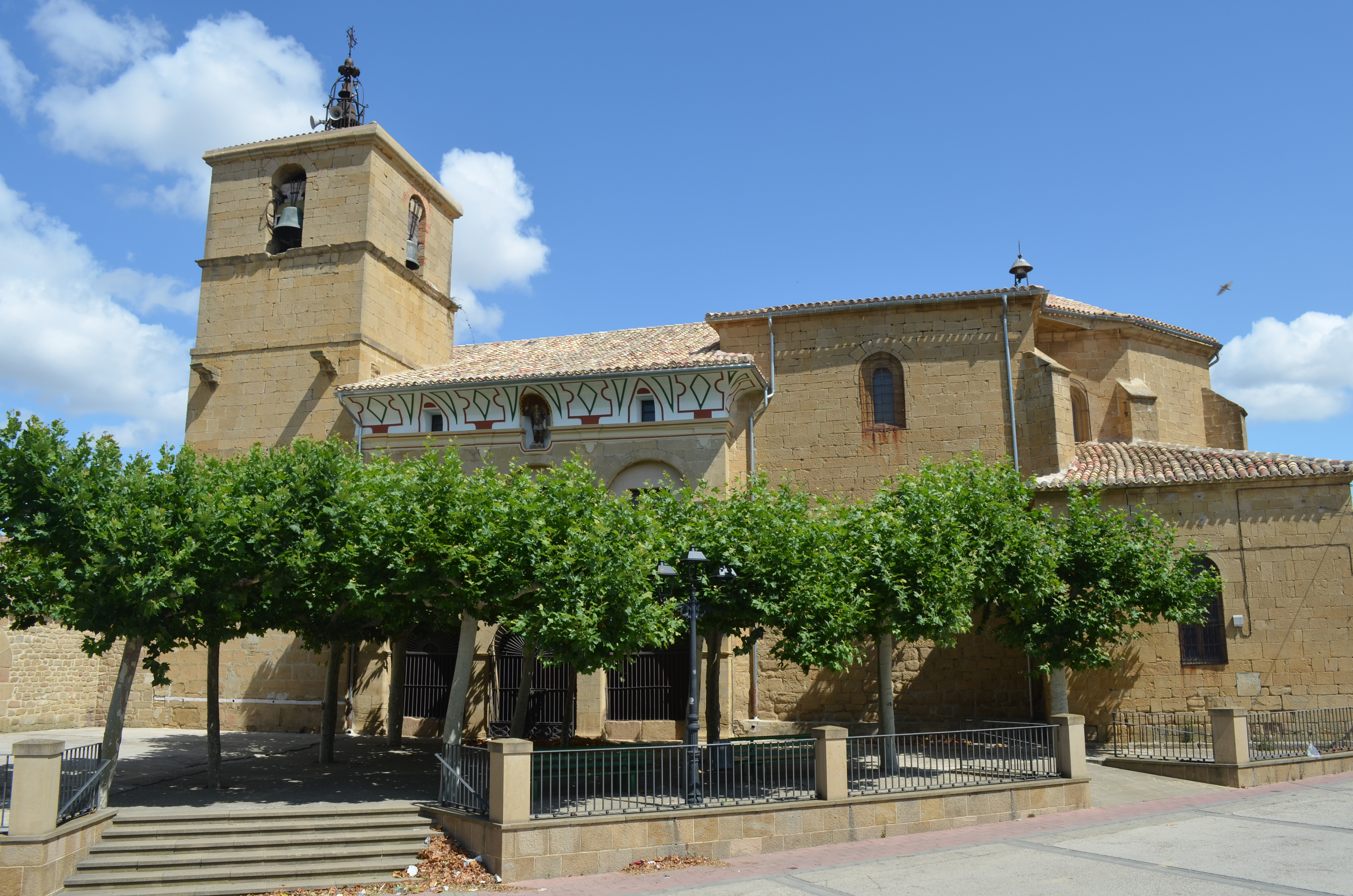
Iglesia de San Miguel - Oteiza de la Solana (Navarra)

== Religious monuments ==
- The Church of San Miguel is of medieval and Romanesque origin, was remodeled in the 16th century and later in 1704.
- The Church of San Salvador
- Hermitage of San Tirso.

== Fiestas ==
On May 1, the traditional pilgrimage to the Hermitage of San Tirso takes place.

The town's patron saint is San Miguel and his festival is celebrated in mid-August.

== The legend of the whale ==
Many years ago in Oteiza de la Solana, there was a pool called Idoia. It was located on the outskirts of the town. Nearby there was a farmyard and their animals went every day to drink fresh water from the pool.

One day, at nightfall, a peasant returned home after his work. As he passed the pool, he saw something moving and was alarmed. He ran to the town believing he had seen a whale.

The villagers, very frightened, ran towards the pool with shotguns, brooms and many weapons in hand. One approached carefully to inspect the place and communicated to all present that it was nothing more than a simple and miserable basque that surely belonged to the owner of the farmyard.

Since then it is common for the Oceizan to be called whalers .
