= FE Figueres =

Spanish association football team

Figueres
- Full name: UFundació Esportiva Figueres
- Founded: 1996
- President: José Antonio Revilla

Fundació Esportiva Figueres is a Spanish sports foundation, from the city of Figueres (Girona), founded in 1996. Linked to the Unió Esportiva Figueres, its activity focuses on football. Currently, it has various teams up to category Benjamin. He also had a senior amateur team, dissolved in 2008, who played in the national category of the Spanish league for three seasons.

== History ==
The origins of the organisation date back to 1996. Albert Valentín, technical secretary of Unió Esportiva Figueres — then established as a Sports Public Limited Company — convinced the board members to create an entity with its own legal personality to manage the club's grassroots football, without depending on the sporting results or possible financial conflicts of the first professional team. On 7 June 1996, Fundació Esportiva Figueres was established as a non-profit organisation, with the aim of promoting children's and youth sport.
