= CD Aoiz =

Aoiz
- Full name: Club Deportivo Aoiz
- Founded: 1929
- Ground: San Miguel, Aoiz - Agoitz, Spain
- Capacity: 2,000
- Chairman: (Spain) Joaquín Unzué
- Manager: (Spain) Alfredo Latienda
- League: Tercera Federación – Group 15
- 2025–26: Tercera Federación – Group 15, 14th of 18
Home colours	Away colours

Club Deportivo Aoiz is a Spanish football team based in Aoiz - Agoitz in the autonomous community of Navarre. Founded in 1929, it plays in Tercera Federación – Group 15. Its stadium is Estadio San Miguel with a capacity of 2000 seats.

== Season to season ==
Season	Tier	Division	Place	Copa del Rey
1941–42	5	2ª Reg.	4th	
1942–43	4	2ª Reg.		
1943–44	4	2ª Reg.	1st	
1944–45	4	1ª Reg.	8th	
1945–46	DNP			
1946–47	DNP			
1947–48	5	2ª Reg.	5th	
1948–49	DNP			
1949–50	DNP			
1950–51	DNP			
1951–52	5	2ª Reg.	1st	
1952–53	5	2ª Reg.	4th	
1953–1968	DNP			
1968–69	5	2ª Reg.	9th	
1969–70	5	2ª Reg.	15th	
1970–1991	DNP			
1991–92	6	1ª Reg.	7th	
1992–93	6	1ª Reg.	4th	
1993–94	6	1ª Reg.	1st	
1994–95	6	1ª Reg.	1st	

Season	Tier	Division	Place	Copa del Rey
1995–96	5	Reg. Pref.	1st	
1996–97	4	3ª	16th	
1997–98	4	3ª	12th	
1998–99	4	3ª	13th	
1999–2000	4	3ª	6th	
2000–01	4	3ª	14th	
2001–02	4	3ª	8th	
2002–03	4	3ª	5th	
2003–04	4	3ª	11th	
2004–05	4	3ª	11th	
2005–06	4	3ª	11th	
2006–07	4	3ª	15th	
2007–08	4	3ª	11th	
2008–09	4	3ª	11th	
2009–10	4	3ª	12th	
2010–11	4	3ª	14th	
2011–12	4	3ª	16th	
2012–13	4	3ª	17th	
2013–14	5	Reg. Pref.	7th	
2014–15	5	Reg. Pref.	7th	

Season	Tier	Division	Place	Copa del Rey
2015–16	5	1ª Aut.	11th	
2016–17	5	1ª Aut.	6th	
2017–18	5	1ª Aut.	11th	
2018–19	5	1ª Aut.	7th	
2019–20	5	1ª Aut.	9th	
2020–21	5	1ª Aut.	8th	
2021–22	6	1ª Aut.	7th	
2022–23	6	1ª Aut.	3rd	
2023–24	6	1ª Aut.	8th	
2024–25	6	1ª Aut.	1st	
2025–26	5	3ª Fed.	14th	
2026–27	5	3ª Fed.		

- 17 seasons in Tercera División
- 2 seasons in Tercera Federación
