= Arróniz =

Coordinates: 42°35′20″N 2°05′29″W

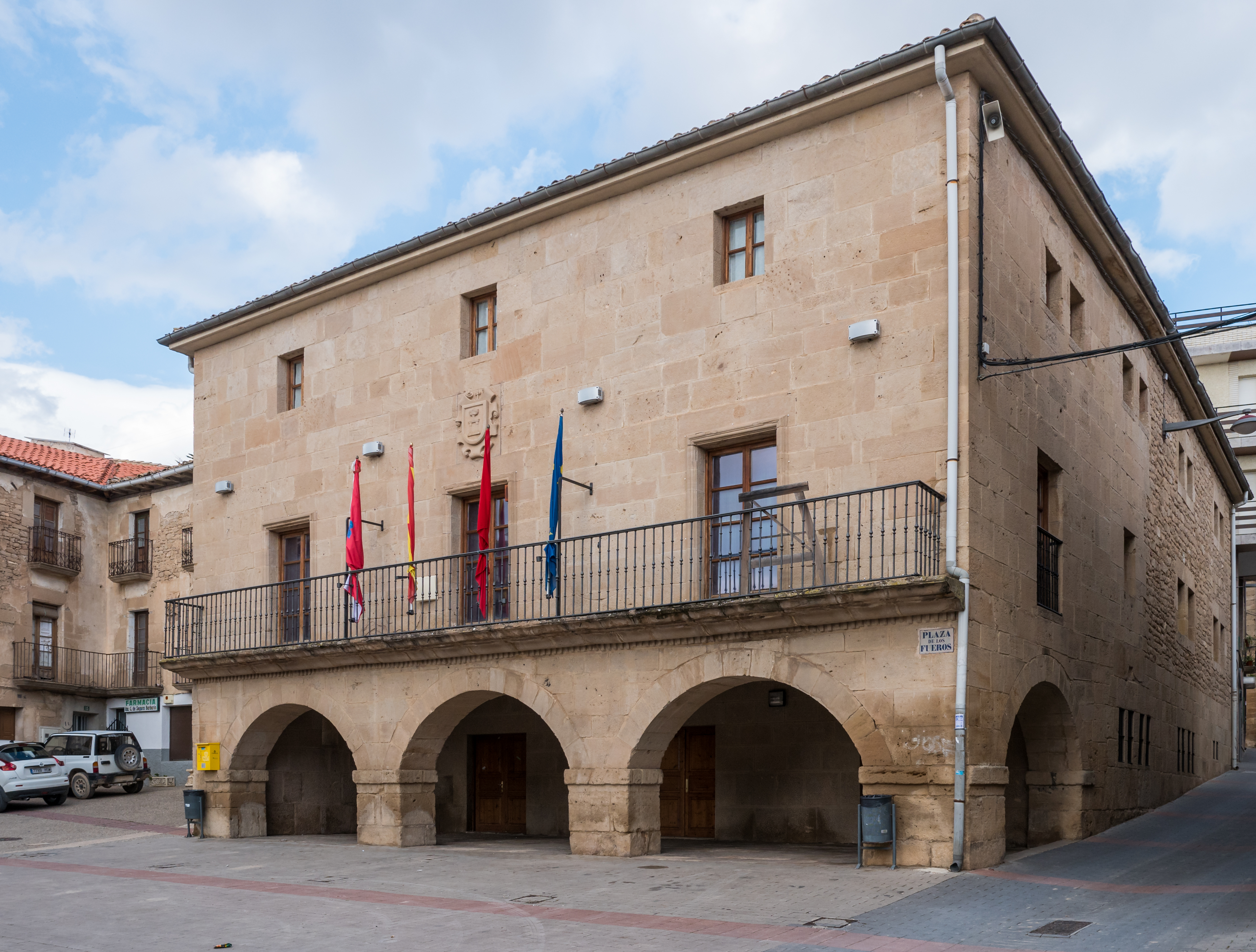
- Town hall

- Coat of arms

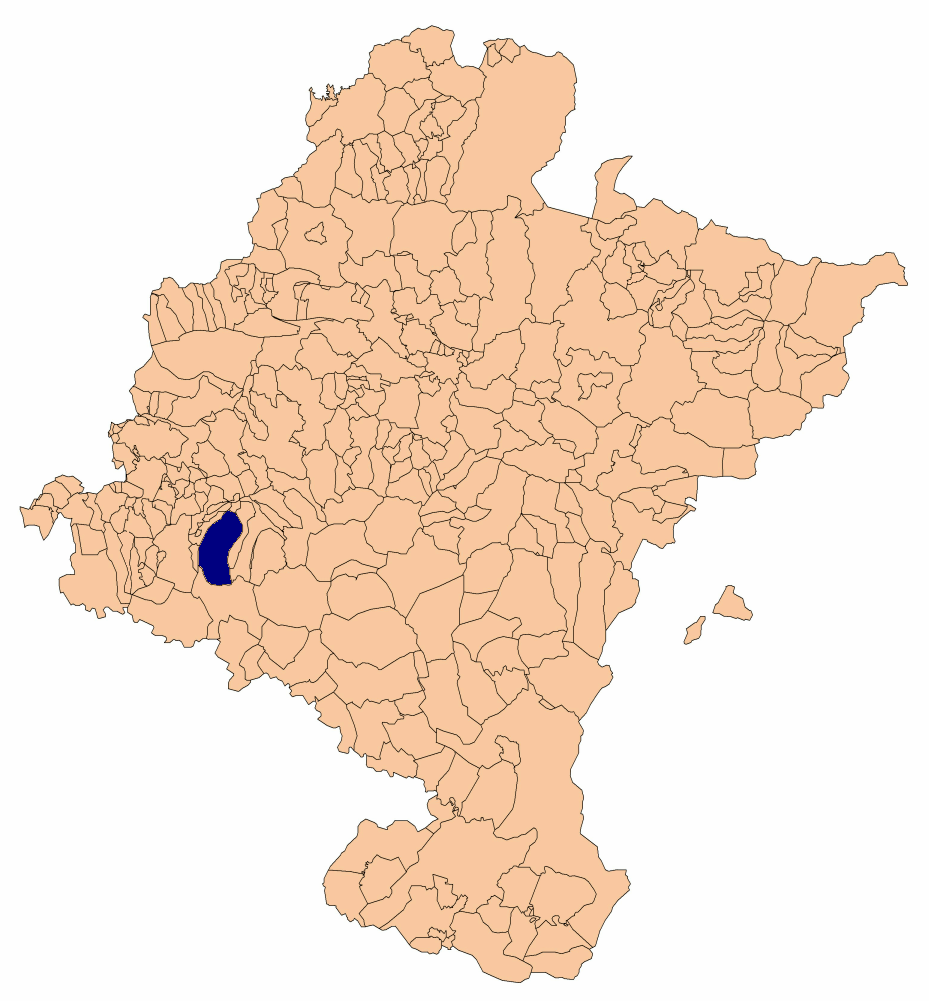
- Map of Arroniz
- Country: Spain

Population
  - Total: 1,036

Arróniz (Basque: Arroitz) is a town and municipality located in the province and autonomous community of Navarre, northern Spain.
