= Azagra =

Municipality of Spain

Coordinates: 42°18′N 1°54′W

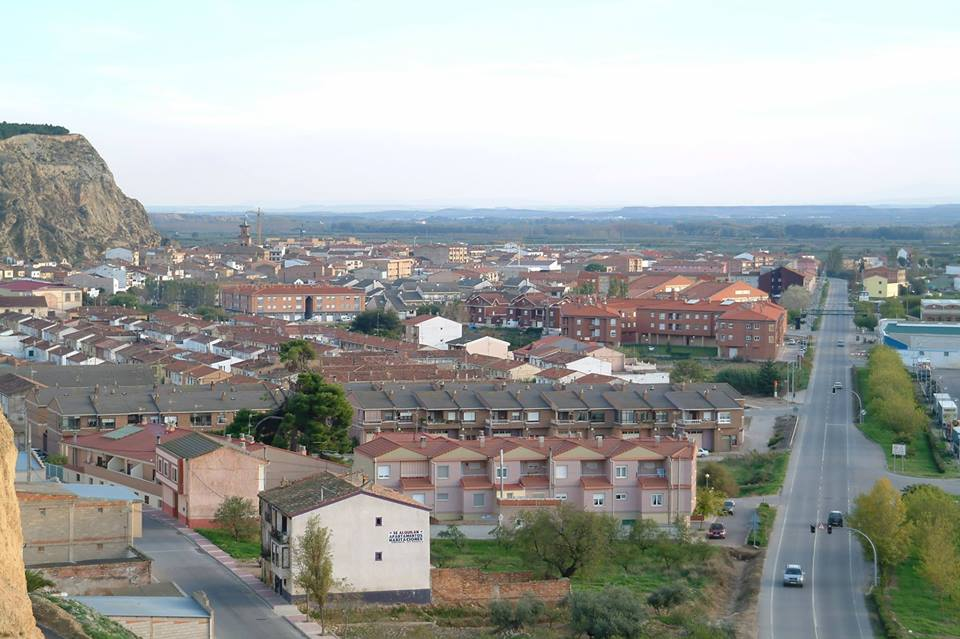

Azagra's flag

Azagra's coat of arms

Azagra is a town and municipality located in the province and autonomous community of Navarre, northern Spain.
