= Andosilla =

- Municipality
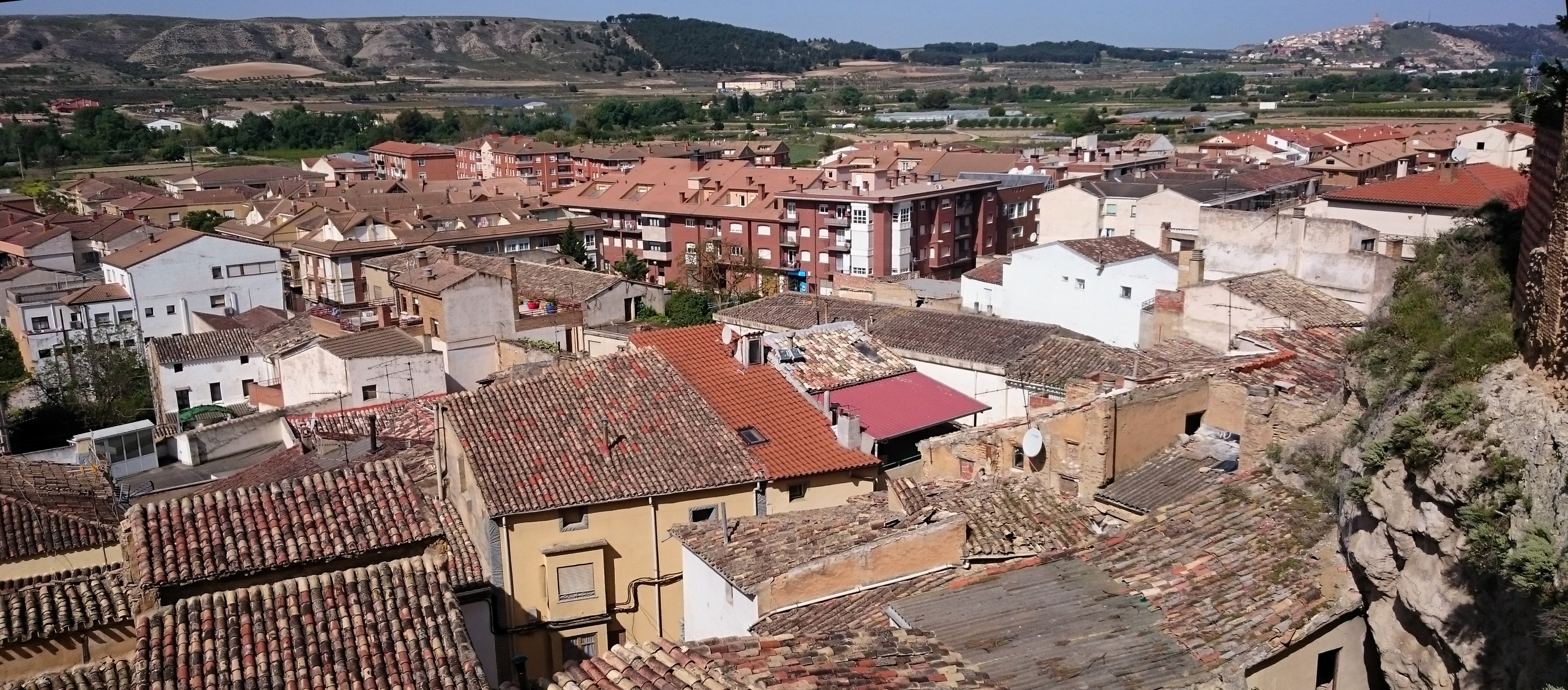

- Coat of arms

- Location in Navarre
- Coordinates: 42°22′59″N 1°40′00″W
- Country: Spain
- Community: Navarre
- Province: Navarre
- Comarca: Ribera del Alto Ebro
- Judicial party: Estella

Government
  - Mayor: Juan Enrique Sanzo

Area
  - Total: 51.51 km^{2} (19.89 sq mi)
- Elevation: 306 m (1,004 ft)

Population (2010)
  - Total: 2,913
  - Density: 56.55/km^{2} (146.5/sq mi)
- Demonym: Andolenses
- Time zone: UTC+1 (CET)
  - Summer (DST): UTC+2 (CEST)
- Postal code: 31261
- Website: Official website

Andosilla is a town in the province and autonomous community of Navarra, northern Spain.

== Twin towns ==
- Arnedo, Spain
