= Divisiones Regionales de Fútbol in Navarre =

The Divisiones Regionales de Fútbol in the Community of Navarre:

- Primera Autonómica (Level 6 of the Spanish football pyramid)
- Preferente de Navarra (Level 7)
- Primera Regional de Navarra (Level 8)

== League chronology ==
Timeline

== Primera Autonómica ==
Primera Autonómica
- Founded: 2015
- Country: Spain
- Number of clubs: 2 groups
- Level on pyramid: 6
- Promotion to: 3ª Federación – Group 15
- Relegation to: Preferente
- Website: www.futnavarra.es

The Primera Autonómica de Navarra is the sixth level of competition in the Spanish League Football in the Community of Navarre.

=== 2022–23 teams ===
==== Group 1 ====
- Aoiz
- Baztan
- Bidezarra
- Corellano
- Erriberri
- Infanzones
- Injerto
- Idoya
- Lourdes
- Murchante
- Peña Azagresa
- San Miguel

==== Group 2 ====
- At. Artajonés
- At. Valtierrano
- Beti Kozkor
- Gares
- Iruña
- Lerinés
- Mendi
- Mutilvera B
- River Ega
- San Adrián
- Zarramonza

=== Champions ===
Primera Aut.
Season	Team	
2018–19	Peña Azagresa	
2017–18	C.D. Beti Onak	
2016–17	Beti Kozkor K.E.	
2015–16	C.D. Lourdes	
Preferente
Season	Gr. I	Gr. II
2014–15	C.D. Mendi	C.D. River Ega
2013–14	C.D. Ardoi	C.D. Idoya

== Regional Preferente ==
Regional Preferente
- Founded: 1974 (with La Rioja); 1986
- Country: Spain
- Number of clubs: 2 groups of 16
- Level on pyramid: 7
- Promotion to: 1ª Aut.
- Relegation to: Primera Regional
- Website: http://www.futnavarra.es/

The Regional Preferente de Navarra is the seventh level of competition in the Spanish League Football in the Community of Navarre.

== Primera Regional ==
Primera Regional
- Founded: Unknown
- Country: Spain
- Number of clubs: 64; 4 groups of 16
- Level on pyramid: 8
- Promotion to: Preferente
- Website: http://www.futnavarra.es/

The Primera Regional is the eighth level of competition in the Spanish League Football in the Community of Navarre.
