= 2009 Tercera División play-offs =

Spanish football league play-offs

The 2009 Tercera División play-offs to Segunda División B from Tercera División (Promotion play-offs) were the final playoffs for the promotion from 2008–09 Tercera División to 2009–10 Segunda División B. The first four teams in each group (excluding reserve teams) took part in the play-off.

== New Format ==
To start with, the eighteen group winners had the opportunity to be promoted directly to Segunda División B. The eighteen group winners were drawn into a two-legged series where the nine winners promoted to Segunda División B. The nine losing clubs entered the play-off round for the last nine promotion spots.

The eighteen runners-up were drawn against one of the seventeen fourth-placed clubs outside their group and the eighteen third-placed clubs were drawn against one another in a two-legged series. The twenty-seven winners advanced with the nine losing clubs from the champions' series to determine the eighteen teams that entered the last two-legged series for the last nine promotion spots. In all the playoff series, the lower-ranked club played at home first. Whenever there was a tie in position (e.g. like the group winners in the champions' series or the third-placed teams in the first round), a draw determined the club to play at home first.

== Teams for 2008–09 play-offs ==
- All groups as 38 of 38 rounds.
- The teams highlighted in yellow played the play-offs to Segunda División B.
- The teams highlighted in red were relegated to Divisiones Regionales.

Teams - Group 1 (Galicia)	Pts
SD Compostela	85
Montañeros CF	76
CD Ourense	71
CCD Cerceda	64
Portonovo SD	39
Arosa SC	35
Gran Peña FC	34

Teams - Group 2 (Asturias)	Pts
Real Oviedo	103
AD Universidad Oviedo	73
Candás CF	70
CD Llanes	69
Club Nalón	38
Club Siero	36
CD Mosconia	34

Teams - Group 3 (Cantabria)	Pts
RS Gimnástica Torrelavega	101
SD Noja	86
CD Tropezón	82
UM Escobedo	75
Santoña CF	36
CD Guarnizo	26
Velarde CF	6

Teams - Group 4 (Basque C.)	Pts
CD Lagun Onak	73
Amurrio Club	73
CD Elgoibar	70
Club Portugalete	70
Ordizia KE	40
Deportivo Alavés B	32
Club San Ignacio	19

Teams - Group 5(Catalonia)	Pts
RCD Espanyol B	83
CF Reus Deportiu	79
CE L'Hospitalet	76
FC Santboià	66
CE Mataró	36
UE Villajüiga	31
CD Banyoles	18

Teams - Group 6 (Valencia)	Pts
Villajoyosa CF	74
Alicante CF B	71
CF La Nucía	71
FC Torrevieja	68
CD Castellón B	38
Pego CF	24
CD Utiel	24

Teams - Group 7 (Madrid)	Pts
RSD Alcalá	88
AD Parla	77
CF Rayo Majadahonda	69
Fútbol Alcobendas Sport	68
CD Puerta Bonita	51
CD Las Rozas	46
CD Colonia Ofigevi	30
CF Pozuelo Alarcón	29
UD Collado Villalba	8

Teams - Group 8 (C. y León)	Pts
CF Palencia	90
CD Mirandés	86
Burgos CF	81
Real Ávila CF	79
CD Becerril	31
CF Norma San Leonardo	28
CD Cebrereña	25

Teams - Group 9 (E. Andalusia)	Pts
Unión Estepona CF	87
UD Almería B	82
Motril CF	78
Málaga CF B	68
CP Granada 74	36
CD Imperio de Albolote	28
SRC Casino del Real	26
Mengíbar CF	(R)

Teams - Group 10 (W. Andalusia)	Pts
CD San Roque	74
Jerez Industrial CF	73
UD Los Barrios	67
CD Alcalá	66
Chiclana CF	28
CA Antoniano	22
CD Villanueva	(R)

Teams - Group 11 (Balearic I.)	Pts
RCD Mallorca B	87
CF Sporting Mahonés	75
CD Santanyí	73
CD Binissalem	71
SE Eivissa-Ibiza B	46
CD Manacor	28
CE Artà	27
CD Andratx	26

Teams - Group 12 (Canary I.)	Pts
CD Tenerife B	81
SD Tenisca	80
Castillo CF	69
CD Mensajero	66
V.S. Brígida B	42
UD Tegueste	39
CD Arguineguín	35
CD Teguise	27

Teams - Group 13 (Murcia)	Pts
Caravaca CF	87
Moratalla CF	83
CD La Unión	80
Yeclano Deportivo	80
CD Pozo Estrecho	30
Muleño CF	23
Ciudad de Lorca CF	12

Teams - Group 14(Extremadura)	Pts
AD Cerro de Reyes	92
CP Cacereño	91
CF Villanovense	74
CD Don Benito	65
CD Díter Zafra	29
UP Plasencia	35
CP Valdivia	28

Teams - Group 15 (Navarre)	Pts
CD Izarra	92
Peña Sport FC	89
CD Tudelano	73
UD Mutilvera	73
CD Idoya	43
CF Ardoi FE	41
SD Lagunak	37
CD Mendi	23

Teams - Group 16 (La Rioja)	Pts
CD Varea	96
Haro Deportivo	84
CD Anguiano	83
CD Calahorra	80
CD Tedeón EF	17
AD Fundación Logroñés	16
CD Logroñés	(R)

Teams - Group 17 (Aragon)	Pts
CA Monzón	88
Real Zaragoza B	86
CD Teruel	82
CD La Muela	80
UD San Lorenzo	38
CD Binéfar	38
CD Zuera	21
CD Brea	21

Teams - Group 18 (Castile-La Mancha)	Pts
CD Toledo	78
UD Almansa	69
Manchego CF	65
Hellín Deportivo	59
CD Torpedo 66	28
Atlético Tarazona	19
Atlético Esquivias CF	(R)

== Qualifiers ==
- The regular season ended on 17 May 2009.
- The play-offs began on 23 May and ended on 28 June 2009.

=== 1st qualifier ===
For 1st of group only.

Home Matches:
23 May 2009
Gimn. Torrelavega	1–0	Lagun Onak
24 May 2009
Cerro Reyes	1–1	Varea
Alcalá	2–2	Villajoyosa
Espanyol B	2–0	Tenerife B
Compostela	3–0	Atl. Monzón
Izarra	0–0	Palencia
Caravaca	3–2	Unión Estepona
Real Oviedo	1–0	Mallorca B
San Roque	0–0	Toledo

Away Matches:
30 May 2009
Lagun Onak	4–3	Gimn. Torrelavega	Agg:4–4
31 May 2009
Unión Estepona	2–1	Caravaca	Agg:4–4
Varea	1–1	Cerro Reyes	Agg:2–2//Pen:3–0
Villajoyosa	1–1	Alcalá	Agg:3–3
Tenerife B	2–1	Espanyol B	Agg:2–3
Mallorca B	1–0	Real Oviedo	Agg:1–1//Pen:5–6
Toledo	3–0	San Roque	Agg:3–0
Palencia	4–1	Izarra	Agg:4–1
Atl. Monzón	2–1	Compostela	Agg:2–4

  - Promoted to Segunda División B:Gimn. de Torrelavega, Unión Estepona, Villajoyosa, Varea, Espanyol B, Real Oviedo, Toledo, Palencia and Compostela
  - Losers:Lagun Onak, Caravaca, Alcalá, Cerro Reyes, Tenerife B, Mallorca B, San Roque, Izarra and Atl. Monzón, continue in the 3rd qualifier

=== 2nd qualifier ===
For 2nd, 3rd and 4th of group only. 2nds played against 4ths and 3rds played against each other.

Home Matches:
23 May 2009
Binissalem	1–0	Reus
La Unión	1–1	Rayo Majadahonda
Mutilvera	0–0	Sporting Mahonés
Hellín	1–0	Montañeros
24 May 2009
Alcalá Guadaíra	2–0	Moratalla
Málaga B	1–0	Almansa
Portugalete	2–2	Universidad Oviedo
Llanes	0–0	Alicante B
Alcobendas	1–1	Noja
L'Hospitalet	3–0	Santanyí
Castillo	1–0	Anguiano
Mensajero	1–1	Amurrio
Escobedo	3–1	Zaragoza B
Don Benito	0–0	Parla
Torrevieja	1–0	Haro
Ourense	4–0	Tudelano
Villanovense	2–0	Teruel
La Nucía	3–1	Motril
Cerceda	1–0	Peña Sport
Yeclano	0–0	Cacereño
La Muela	1–3	Mirandés
Santboià	0–0	Tenisca
Calahorra	0–1	Jerez Industrial
Tropezón	3–2	Candás
Real Ávila	0–0	Almería B
Los Barrios	2–1	Manchego
Burgos	2–0	Elgoibar

Away Matches:
30 May 2009
Santanyí	3–0	L'Hospitalet	Agg:3–3//Pen:12–11
Candás	0–2	Tropezón	Agg:2–5
Elgoibar	1–0	Burgos	Agg:1–2
Peña Sport	3–1	Cerceda	Agg:3–2
Amurrio	3–0	Mensajero	Agg:4–1
Sporting Mahonés	1–0	Mutilvera	Agg:1–0
Manchego	1–1	Los Barrios	Agg:2–3
31 May 2009
Zaragoza B	3–0	Escobedo	Agg:4–3
Almería B	1–1	Real Ávila	Agg:1–1
Parla	1–1	Don Benito	Agg:1–1
Alicante B	0–0	Llanes	Agg:0–0//Pen:4–2
Universidad Oviedo	4–1	Portugalete	Agg:6–3
Noja	2–0	Alcobendas	Agg:3–1
Rayo Majadahonda	0–1	La Unión	Agg:1–2
Tenisca	1–0	Santboià	Agg:1–0
Anguiano	2–3	Castillo	Agg:2–4
Mirandés	4–1	La Muela	Agg:7–2
Montañeros	0–0	Hellín	Agg:0–1
Cacereño	3–1	Yeclano	Agg:3–1
Haro	2–0	Torrevieja	Agg:2–1
Reus	0–0	Binissalem	Agg:0–1
Tudelano	2–1	Ourense	Agg:2–5
Teruel	3–1	Villanovense	Agg:3–3
Jerez Industrial	2–0	Calahorra	Agg:3–0
Almansa	1–1	Málaga B	Agg:1–2
Moratalla	0–0	Alcalá Guadaíra	Agg:0–2
Motril	1–1	La Nucía	Agg:2–4

=== 3rd qualifier ===
Winners of 2nd qualifier (27 teams) and losers of 1st qualifier (9 teams).

Home Matches:
6 June 2009
La Unión	0–0	Noja
Santanyí	0–0	Jerez Industrial
Tropezón	1–1	Cerro Reyes
Villanovense	1–3	San Roque
Hellín	1–2	Izarra
Ourense	2–1	Universidad Oviedo
7 June 2009
Zaragoza B	2–0	Tenisca
Alcalá Guadaíra	0–2	Caravaca
Castillo	0–0	Alicante B
Don Benito	0–1	Mallorca B
Haro	1–2	Cacereño
Málaga B	4–2	Tenerife B
Mirandés	4–0	Peña Sport
Binissalem	0–0	Atl. Monzón
Real Ávila	1–0	Alcalá
La Nucía	0–0	Lagun Onak
Los Barrios	3–1	Amurrio
Burgos	2–2	Sporting Mahonés

Away Matches:
13 June 2009
Alicante B	1–4	Castillo	Agg:1–4
Lagun Onak	1–1	La Nucía	Agg:1–1
Noja	1–0	La Unión	Agg:1–0
Atl. Monzón	0–1	Binissalem	Agg:0–1
Sporting Mahonés	1–0	Burgos	Agg:3–2
Universidad Oviedo	1–1	Ourense	Agg:2–3
Izarra	0–1	Hellín	Agg:2–2
San Roque	2–1	Villanovense	Agg:5–2
14 June 2009
Cerro Reyes	2–1	Tropezón	Agg:3–2
Jerez Industrial	3–0	Santanyí	Agg:3–0
Alcalá	5–2	Real Ávila	Agg:5–3
Tenisca	2–0	Zaragoza B	Agg:2–2//Pen:4–3
Peña Sport	0–1	Mirandés	Agg:0–5
Mallorca B	2–0	Don Benito	Agg:3–0
Cacereño	2–0	Haro	Agg:4–1
Caravaca	2–0	Alcalá Guadaíra	Agg:4–0
Amurrio	4–2	Los Barrios	Agg:5–5
Tenerife B	3–1	Málaga B	Agg:5–5

=== 4th qualifier ===
Winners of 3rd qualifier.

Home Matches:
20 June 2009
Jerez Industrial	0–1	Mirandés
Sporting Mahonés	2–1	Tenerife B
Binissalem	0–0	San Roque
21 June 2009
Castillo	2–1	Mallorca B
Noja	0–1	Izarra
La Nucía	0–0	Alcalá
Ourense	1–0	Caravaca
Cacereño	2–0	Tenisca
Los Barrios	0–1	Cerro Reyes

Away Matches:
27 June 2009
Izarra	1–1	Noja	Agg:2–1
San Roque	2–1	Binissalem	Agg:2–1
Alcalá	2–0	La Nucía	Agg:2–0
28 June 2009
Cerro Reyes	1–0	Los Barrios	Agg:2–0
Tenerife B	0–1	Sporting Mahonés	Agg:1–3
Tenisca	0–1	Cacereño	Agg:0–3
Caravaca	3–1	Ourense	Agg:3–2
Mallorca B	1–0	Castillo	Agg:2–2
Mirandés	3–2	Jerez Industrial	Agg:4–2

  - Promoted to Segunda División B:Izarra, San Roque, Alcalá, Cerro Reyes, Sporting Mahonés, Cacereño, Caravaca, Mallorca B and Mirandés
