= 2003 Tercera División play-offs =

Spanish football league play-offs

The 2003 Tercera División play-offs to Segunda División B from Tercera División (Promotion play-offs) were the final playoffs for the promotion from 2002–03 Tercera División to 2003–04 Segunda División B. The first four teams in each group (excluding reserve teams) took part in the play-off.

== Format ==
The 72 participating teams were divided into 5 series each made up of 4 groups in the category, with the exception of Series E , which was only formed by Group XII . Each series was divided into 4 groups formed by a 1st, a 2nd, a 3rd and a 4th classified from each group, which played a double-round playoff. Each victory was equivalent to 3 points, the tie to 1 point and the defeat to 0 points. The champion of each group obtained the promotion to Second Division B.

The distribution of each series was as follows:

Series A:

- Group I – Galicia (Galicia (Spain))
- Group II – Asturias
- Group VII – Community of Madrid
- Group VIII – Castile and León

Series B:

- Group III – Cantabria
- Group IV – Basque Country (Basque Country (autonomous community))
- Group XV – La Rioja and Navarre
- Group XVI – Aragon

Series C:

- Group V – Catalonia
- Group VI – Valencian Community
- Group XI – Balearic Islands
- Gruoup XIII – Region of Murcia

Series D:

- Group IX – Eastern Andalusia and Melilla
- Group X – Western Andalusia and Ceuta
- Group XIV – Extremadura
- Group XVII – Castilla–La Mancha

Series E:

- Group XII – Canary Islands

== Teams for 2002–03 play-offs ==
Group I – Galicia (Galicia (Spain))	Group II – Asturias	Group III – Cantabria	Group IV – Basque Country (Basque Country (autonomous community))	Group V – Catalonia
1st CCD Cerceda	1st Caudal Deportivo	1st Velarde CF	1st CD Basconia	1st CF Badalona
2nd Deportivo B	2nd Real Titánico	2nd SD Barreda Balompié	2nd Real Sociedad B	2nd Girona FC
3rd Atlético Arteixo	3rd Sporting Gijón B	3rd CD Tropezón	3rd Zalla UC	3rd UE Sant Andreu
4th Rápido de Bouzas	4th Real Oviedo B	4th SD Reocín	4th SD Lemona	4th CF Vilanova

Group VI – Valencian Community	Group VII – Community of Madrid	Group VIII – Castile and León	Group IX – E. Andalusia and Melilla	Group X – W. Andalusia and Ceuta
1st Benidorm CD	1st UD San Sebastián de los Reyes	1st CF Palencia	1st CP Granada 74	1st CD Villanueva
2nd Villajoyosa CF	2nd CDA Navalcarnero	2nd CF Promesas Ponferrada	2nd UD Marbella	2nd UD Los Palacios
3rd CD Onda	3rd CF Fuenlabrada	3rd La Bañeza FC	3rd RUD Carolinense	3rd Atlético Lucentino Industrial
4th Levante UD B	4th Rayo Majadahonda	4th CD Guijuelo	4th Granada CF	4th CD Alcalá

Group XI – Balearic Islands	Group XII – Canary Islands	Group XIII – Region of Murcia	Group XIV – Extremadura	Group XV – Navarre and La Rioja
1st CF Vilafranca	1st UD Vecindario	1st Lorca Deportiva	1st AD Cerro de Reyes	1st CD Mirandés
2nd CE Constancia	2nd Castillo CF	2nd Yeclano CF	2nd CD Don Benito	2nd CD Alfaro
3rd CD Manacor	3rd CD Tenerife B	3rd AD Mar Menor-San Javier	3rd CF Villanovense	3rd CD Recreación
4th UD Poblense	4th UD Las Palmas B	4th Águilas CF	4th CD Badajoz B	4th CD Oberena

Group XVI – Aragon	Group XVII – Castilla–La Mancha
1st UD Fraga	1st Hellín Deportivo
2nd SD Huesca	2nd CD Quintanar del Rey
3rd UD Casetas	3rd CD Guadalajara
4th UD Barbastro	4th Tomelloso CF

== Tables and Results ==
=== Group A–1 ===
Pos	Team	Pld	W	D	L	GF	GA	GD	Pts	Qualification or relegation
1	(Community of Madrid) Rayo Majadahonda (substituted on)	6	4	2	0	14	5	+9	14	Promoted to Segunda División B
2	(Galicia (Spain)) CCD Cerceda	6	2	3	1	8	8	0	9	
3	(Asturias) Real Titánico	6	2	2	2	5	7	−2	8	
4	(Castile and León) La Bañeza FC	6	0	1	5	5	12	−7	1	

Source: Fútbol Regional

Home \ Away	CER	LBA	RMJ	TIT
CCD Cerceda	—	2–1	1–1	0–0
La Bañeza FC	0–1	—	1–2	1–1
Rayo Majadahonda	3–1	3–0	—	3–0
Real Titánico	2–0	3–2	2–2	—

Source: Fútbol Regional
Legend: Blue = home team win; Yellow = draw; Red = away team win.

=== Group A-2 ===
Pos	Team	Pld	W	D	L	GF	GA	GD	Pts	Qualification or relegation
1	(Community of Madrid) UD San Sebastián de los Reyes (substituted on)	6	5	0	1	10	4	+6	15	Promoted to Segunda División B
2	(Galicia (Spain)) Deportivo La Coruña B	6	3	1	2	8	5	+3	10	
3	(Asturias) Sporting Gijón B	6	3	0	3	6	5	+1	9	
4	(Castile and León) CD Guijuelo	6	0	1	5	2	12	−10	1	

Source: Fútbol Regional

Home \ Away	DEP	GUI	SSE	SPO
RC Deportivo B	—	3–0	2–0	1–0
CD Guijuelo	0–0	—	0–1	0–1
UD SS Reyes	2–1	5–1	—	1–0
Sporting B	3–1	2–1	0–1	—

Source: Fútbol Regional
Legend: Blue = home team win; Yellow = draw; Red = away team win.

=== Group A-3 ===
Pos	Team	Pld	W	D	L	GF	GA	GD	Pts	Qualification or relegation
1	(Castile and León) CF Palencia (substituted on)	6	4	2	0	10	3	+7	14	Promoted to Segunda División B
2	(Galicia (Spain)) Atlético Arteixo	6	3	2	1	9	6	+3	11	
3	(Community of Madrid) CDA Navalcarnero	6	1	2	3	3	6	−3	5	
4	(Asturias) Real Oviedo B	6	0	2	4	4	11	−7	2	

Source: Fútbol Regional

Home \ Away	ART	NAV	OVI	PAL
Atlético Arteixo	—	0–0	3–0	1–1
CDA Navalcarnero	0–1	—	2–1	0–1
Real Oviedo B	1–3	1–1	—	1–1
CF Palencia	4–1	2–0	1–0	—

Source: Fútbol Regional
Legend: Blue = home team win; Yellow = draw; Red = away team win.

=== Group A-4 ===
Pos	Team	Pld	W	D	L	GF	GA	GD	Pts	Qualification or relegation
1	(Community of Madrid) CF Fuenlabrada (substituted on)	6	2	3	1	5	3	+2	9	Promoted to Segunda División B
2	(Galicia (Spain)) Rápido de Bouzas	6	3	0	3	8	11	−3	9	
3	(Asturias) Caudal Deportivo	6	1	4	1	9	8	+1	7	
4	(Castile and León) CF Promesas Ponferrada	6	1	3	2	6	6	0	6	

Source: Fútbol Regional

Home \ Away	CAU	FUE	PRO	RAP
Caudal Deportivo	—	0–0	1–1	6–3
CF Fuenlabrada	0–0	—	1–0	3–1
CF Promesas Ponferrada	2–2	1–1	—	0–1
Rápido de Bouzas	2–0	1–0	0–2	—

Source: Fútbol Regional
Legend: Blue = home team win; Yellow = draw; Red = away team win.

=== Group B-1 ===
Pos	Team	Pld	W	D	L	GF	GA	GD	Pts	Qualification or relegation
1	(Aragon) UD Casetas (substituted on)	6	4	2	0	12	4	+8	14	Promoted to Segunda División B
2	(Basque Country (autonomous community)) Real Sociedad B (substituted on) (Note: Real Sociedad B was promoted to Segunda División B due to a vacancy in the category.)	6	3	2	1	7	4	+3	11	Promoted to Segunda División B
3	(Cantabria) Velarde CF	6	2	0	4	7	14	−7	6	
4	(Navarre) (La Rioja) CD Oberena	6	0	2	4	4	8	−4	2	

Source: Fútbol Regional
Notes:

Home \ Away	CST	OBE	RSB	VEL
UD Casetas	—	1–0	1–0	3–0
CD Oberena	1–1	—	1–1	1–2
Real Sociedad B	1–1	1–0	—	3–1
Velarde CF	2–5	2–1	0–1	—

Source: Fútbol Regional
Legend: Blue = home team win; Yellow = draw; Red = away team win.

=== Group B-2 ===
Pos	Team	Pld	W	D	L	GF	GA	GD	Pts	Qualification or relegation
1	(Navarre) (La Rioja) CD Recreación (substituted on)	6	5	1	0	10	2	+8	16	Promoted to Segunda División B
2	(Basque Country (autonomous community)) CD Basconia	6	2	2	2	9	8	+1	8	
3	(Aragon) UD Barbastro	6	2	1	3	6	10	−4	7	
4	(Cantabria) SD Barreda Balompié	6	1	0	5	3	8	−5	3	

Source: Fútbol Regional

Home \ Away	BBS	BRD	BSC	REC
UD Barbastro	—	2–0	1–5	1–2
SD Barreda	0–1	—	2–0	0–2
CD Basconia	1–1	2–1	—	0–2
CD Recreación	2–0	1–0	1–1	—

Source: Fútbol Regional
Legend: Blue = home team win; Yellow = draw; Red = away team win.

=== Group B-3 ===
Pos	Team	Pld	W	D	L	GF	GA	GD	Pts	Qualification or relegation
1	(Castile and León) CD Mirandés (substituted on)	6	4	0	2	9	8	+1	12	Promoted to Segunda División B
2	(Basque Country (autonomous community)) SD Lemona	6	3	1	2	12	9	+3	10	
3	(Aragon) SD Huesca	6	3	1	2	11	8	+3	10	
4	(Cantabria) CD Tropezón	6	1	0	5	8	15	−7	3	

Source: Fútbol Regional

Home \ Away	HUE	LEM	MIR	TRO
SD Huesca	—	1–2	0–1	3–1
SD Lemona	2–2	—	1–2	2–0
CD Mirandés	1–2	2–1	—	2–1
CD Tropezón	1–3	2–4	3–1	—

Source: Fútbol Regional
Legend: Blue = home team win; Yellow = draw; Red = away team win.

=== Group B-4 ===
Pos	Team	Pld	W	D	L	GF	GA	GD	Pts	Qualification or relegation
1	(Navarre) (La Rioja) CD Alfaro	6	5	0	1	12	5	+7	15	Promoted to Segunda División B
2	(Basque Country (autonomous community)) Zalla UC	6	4	1	1	11	4	+7	13	
3	(Cantabria) SD Reocín	6	1	1	4	9	14	−5	4	
4	(Aragon) UD Fraga	6	0	2	4	6	15	−9	2	

Source: Fútbol Regional

Home \ Away	ALF	FRA	REO	ZAL
CD Alfaro	—	2–1	3–2	0–1
UD Fraga	0–1	—	3–3	1–1
SD Reocín	0–4	4–0	—	0–2
Zalla UC	1–2	4–1	2–0	—

Source: Fútbol Regional
Legend: Blue = home team win; Yellow = draw; Red = away team win.

=== Group C-1 ===
Pos	Team	Pld	W	D	L	GF	GA	GD	Pts	Qualification or relegation
1	(Region of Murcia) Yeclano CF (substituted on)	6	3	2	1	7	5	+2	11	Promoted to Segunda División B
2	(Balearic Islands) CF Vilafranca	6	2	4	0	9	7	+2	10	
3	(Valencian Community) Levante UD B	6	2	2	2	11	9	+2	8	
4	(Catalonia) UE Sant Andreu	6	0	2	4	2	8	−6	2	

Source: Fútbol Regional

Home \ Away	LEV	SAN	VFR	YEC
Levante UD B	—	3–0	1–2	2–1
UE Sant Andreu	1–1	—	0–0	0–1
CF Vilafranca	3–3	2–1	—	1–1
Yeclano CF	2–1	1–0	1–1	—

Source: Fútbol Regional
Legend: Blue = home team win; Yellow = draw; Red = away team win.

=== Group C-2 ===
Pos	Team	Pld	W	D	L	GF	GA	GD	Pts	Qualification or relegation
1	(Valencian Community) Villajoyosa CF (substituted on)	6	4	1	1	12	3	+9	13	Promoted to Segunda División B
2	(Catalonia) CF Badalona	6	4	0	2	12	7	+5	12	
3	(Region of Murcia) AD Mar Menor-San Javier	6	2	2	2	8	7	+1	8	
4	(Balearic Islands) UD Poblense	6	0	1	5	5	20	−15	1	

Source: Fútbol Regional

Home \ Away	BAD	MAR	POB	VJY
CF Badalona	—	2–0	4–1	0–1
AD Mar Menor-San Javier	1–3	—	4–0	1–0
UD Poblense	2–3	1–1	—	1–5
Villajoyosa CF	2–0	1–1	3–0	—

Source: Fútbol Regional
Legend: Blue = home team win; Yellow = draw; Red = away team win.

=== Group C-3 ===
Pos	Team	Pld	W	D	L	GF	GA	GD	Pts	Qualification or relegation
1	(Catalonia) Girona FC (substituted on)	6	5	0	1	11	2	+9	15	Promoted to Segunda División B
2	(Valencian Community) Benidorm CD	6	5	0	1	13	5	+8	15	
3	(Region of Murcia) Águilas CF	6	2	0	4	9	9	0	6	
4	(Balearic Islands) CD Manacor	6	0	0	6	0	17	−17	0	

Source: Fútbol Regional

Home \ Away	AGU	BEN	GIR	MAN
Águilas CF	—	1–2	0–2	5–0
Benidorm CD	2–1	—	1–0	5–0
Girona FC	3–0	3–1	—	2–0
CD Manacor	0–2	0–2	0–1	—

Source: Fútbol Regional
Legend: Blue = home team win; Yellow = draw; Red = away team win.

=== Group C-4 ===
Pos	Team	Pld	W	D	L	GF	GA	GD	Pts	Qualification or relegation
1	(Region of Murcia) Lorca Deportiva (substituted on)	6	4	2	0	10	2	+8	14	Promoted to Segunda División B
2	(Catalonia) CF Vilanova	6	1	4	1	11	7	+4	7	
3	(Valencian Community) CD Onda	6	1	2	3	6	15	−9	5	
4	(Balearic Islands) CE Constancia	6	0	4	2	7	10	−3	4	

Source: FutbolMe

Home \ Away	CON	LOR	OND	VLN
CE Constancia	—	1–1	3–3	2–2
Lorca Dep.	2–0	—	4–0	0–0
CD Onda	1–0	0–1	—	1–1
CF Vilanova	1–1	1–2	6–1	—

Source: FutbolMe
Legend: Blue = home team win; Yellow = draw; Red = away team win.

=== Group D-1 ===
Pos	Team	Pld	W	D	L	GF	GA	GD	Pts	Qualification or relegation
1	(Andalusia) UD Los Palacios (substituted on)	6	3	1	2	6	3	+3	10	Promoted to Segunda División B
2	(Extremadura) CD Badajoz B	6	3	1	2	6	7	−1	10	
3	(Andalusia) RUD Carolinense	6	3	0	3	5	5	0	9	
4	(Castilla–La Mancha) Hellín Deportivo	6	1	2	3	5	7	−2	5	

Source: FutbolMe

Home \ Away	BAD	CAR	HEL	PAL
CD Badajoz B	—	1–2	1–0	1–0
RUD Carolinense	0–1	—	2–1	0–1
Hellín Deportivo	2–2	0–1	—	0–0
UD Los Palacios	3–0	1–0	1–2	—

Source: FutbolMe
Legend: Blue = home team win; Yellow = draw; Red = away team win.

=== Group D-2 ===
Pos	Team	Pld	W	D	L	GF	GA	GD	Pts	Qualification or relegation
1	(Castilla–La Mancha) Tomelloso CF (substituted on)	6	3	2	1	10	7	+3	11	Promoted to Segunda División B
2	(Extremadura) CD Don Benito	6	3	2	1	11	7	+4	11	
3	(Andalusia) CP Granada 74	6	3	1	2	12	8	+4	10	
4	(Andalusia) Atl. Lucentino Industrial	6	0	1	5	4	15	−11	1	

Source: FutbolMe

Home \ Away	DBE	G74	LUC	TOM
CD Don Benito	—	3–2	2–1	1–1
CP Granada 74	1–1	—	3–1	1–0
Atl. Lucentino Ind.	0–3	0–3	—	0–0
Tomelloso CF	2–1	3–2	4–2	—

Source: FutbolMe
Legend: Blue = home team win; Yellow = draw; Red = away team win.

=== Group D-3 ===
Pos	Team	Pld	W	D	L	GF	GA	GD	Pts	Qualification or relegation
1	(Andalusia) UD Marbella (substituted on)	6	4	2	0	12	6	+6	14	Promoted to Segunda División B
2	(Andalusia) CD Alcalá	6	3	1	2	7	5	+2	10	
3	(Castilla–La Mancha) CD Guadalajara	6	2	1	3	12	12	0	7	
4	(Extremadura) AD Cerro de Reyes	6	1	0	5	10	18	−8	3	

Source: FutbolMe

Home \ Away	ALC	CRR	GUA	MAR
CD Alcalá	—	2–1	2–0	0–1
AD Cerro de Reyes	1–0	—	2–3	2–3
CD Guadalajara	1–2	6–3	—	0–0
UD Marbella	1–1	4–1	3–2	—

Source: FutbolMe
Legend: Blue = home team win; Yellow = draw; Red = away team win.

=== Group D-4 ===
Pos	Team	Pld	W	D	L	GF	GA	GD	Pts	Qualification or relegation
1	(Extremadura) CF Villanovense (substituted on)	6	3	1	2	10	6	+4	10	Promoted to Segunda División B
2	(Castilla–La Mancha) CD Quintanar del Rey	6	3	1	2	6	6	0	10	
3	(Andalusia) Granada CF	6	2	3	1	5	4	+1	9	
4	(Andalusia) CD Villanueva	6	1	1	4	9	14	−5	4	

Source: FutbolMe

Home \ Away	GRA	QDR	VNV	VLN
Granada CF	—	1–1	1–0	1–0
CD Quintanar del Rey	1–0	—	0–2	1–3
CF Villanovense	0–0	0–1	—	5–2
CD Villanueva	2–2	0–2	2–3	—

Source: FutbolMe
Legend: Blue = home team win; Yellow = draw; Red = away team win.

=== Group E ===
Pos	Team	Pld	W	D	L	GF	GA	GD	Pts	Qualification or relegation
1	(Canary Islands) UD Vecindario (substituted on)	6	4	0	2	9	7	+2	12	Promoted to Segunda División B
2	(Canary Islands) UD Las Palmas B	6	3	2	1	7	5	+2	11	
3	(Canary Islands) Castillo CF	6	2	2	2	5	7	−2	8	
4	(Canary Islands) CD Tenerife B	6	1	0	5	8	10	−2	3	

Source: FutbolMe

Home \ Away	CAS	LPA	TFE	VEC
Castillo CF	—	0–0	2–0	2–0
UD Las Palmas B	0–0	—	2–1	3–1
CD Tenerife B	6–1	0–1	—	0–1
UD Vecindario	1–0	3–1	3–1	—

Source: FutbolMe
Legend: Blue = home team win; Yellow = draw; Red = away team win.

== Teams Promoted ==
Group I – Galicia (Galicia (Spain))

- None

Group II – Asturias

- None

Group III – Cantabria

- None

Group IV – Basque Country (Basque Country (autonomous community))

- None

Group V – Catalonia

- Girona FC

Group VI – Valencian Community

- Villajoyosa CF

Group VII – Community of Madrid

- UD San Sebastián de los Reyes
- CF Fuenlabrada
- CF Rayo Majadahonda

Group VIII – Castile and León

- CF Palencia

Group IX – E. Andalusia and Melilla

- UD Marbella

Group X – W. Andalusia and Ceuta

- UD Los Palacios

Group XI – Balearic Islands

- None

Group XII – Canary Islands

- UD Vecindario

Group XIII – Region of Murcia

- Lorca Deportiva
- Yeclano CF

Group XIV – Extremadura

- CF Villanovense

Group XV – Navarre and La Rioja

- CD Mirandés
- CD Alfaro
- CD Recreación

Group XVI – Aragon

- UD Casetas

Group XVII – Castilla–La Mancha

- Tomelloso CF
