= Melon Trophy =

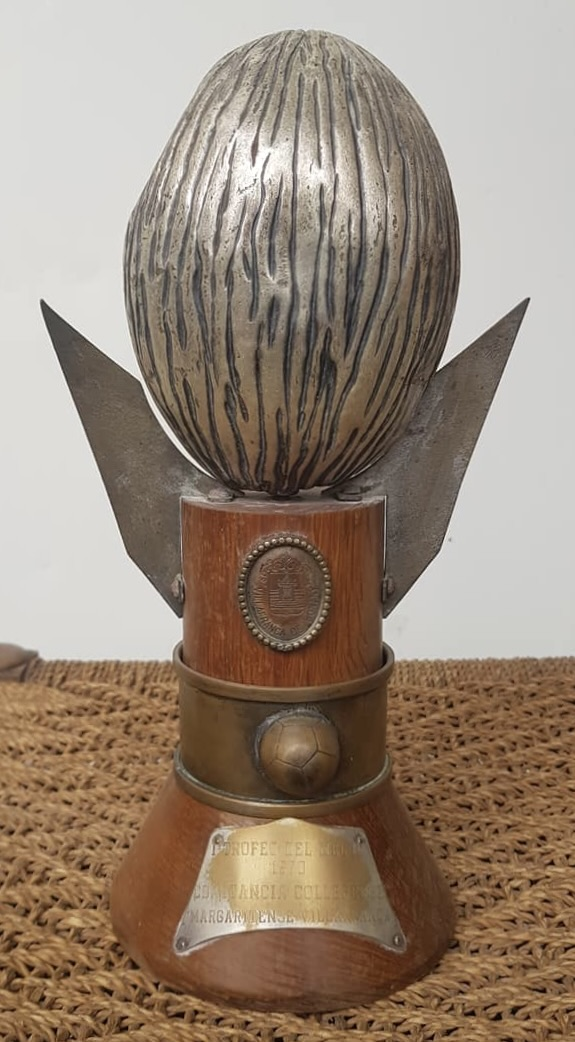
- Trophy of the first edition (1970)
- Organiser(s): CF Vilafranca
- Founded: 1970; 56 years ago
- Region: Vilafranca de Bonany, Balearic Islands
- Most championships: CF Vilafranca (13 titles)

Melon Trophy is a pre-season football tournament held in Vilafranca de Bonany (Mallorca, Balearic Islands, Spain) since 1970. Its organizer was CD Vilafranca, first, and since 1989 CF Vilafranca. It is currently one of the most veteran tournaments of this type in Mallorca, along with Nicolau Brondo (1966), Ciutat de Palma (1969), Trofeu de s'Agricultura (1973) and Torneig de sa Llum (1973).

== History ==
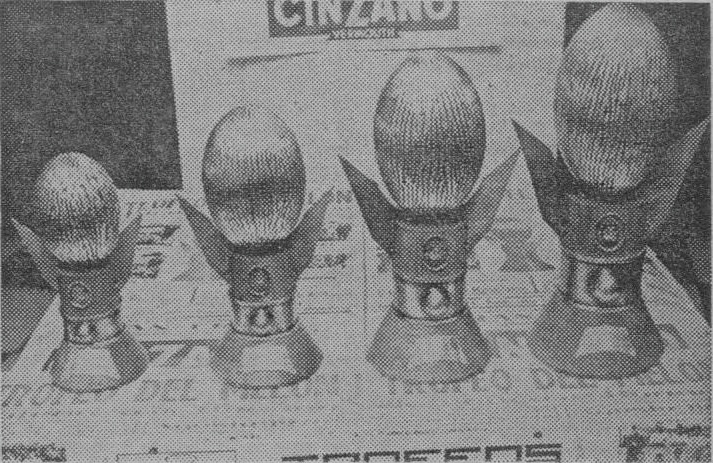
Trophies of the first edition of the tournament (Baleares, 4 July 1970)

In 1969, CD Vilafranca had promoted the Melon Fair to raise funds for the club. It was held at the beginning of September and over time would become one of the main festivals in the festive calendar of Mallorca. The following year, the football tournament was incorporated, which from the beginning achieved great popularity, especially due to the category of participants and the great interest in pre-season summer tournaments at that time.

In the 1970s it was a leading tournament, with the participation of four teams that played semi-finals, a match for third and fourth place, and the grand final. Most of them were members of the Tercera División, but in those years the main clubs of the Islands were in this category. In fact, the most modest participant in terms of sport was precisely CD Vilafranca, which for this reason never managed to get past the semi-final phase.

Throughout the 1980s the tournament lost strength due to several factors. First, the riots caused by the public in the 1978 edition during one of the semi-final matches; second, the gradual loss of interest in summer tournaments (which would end with the disappearance of many of them); and above all the crisis of CD Vilafranca, until it disappeared in 1983, which meant the temporary disappearance of the tournament. In 1988 it was reorganized, even before the official constitution of the current CF Vilafranca, which that year participated with an unofficial team.

During the 90s, teams from a more local and humble area participated, maintaining the original format of four participants and some editions with a single match. During the decade, the local club improved its sporting results, ascending from Tercera regional to the Tercera división (where it would be ten seasons), which made the tournament recover a poster with better potential. The most outstanding edition was that of 2004, with the competition of RCD Mallorca, then in the Primera división.

From 2007, the crisis of CF Vilafranca (it was relegated again to Tercera regional in a few years) caused the tournament to adopt a simpler format. It became a single match and with more modest rivals, in accordance with the sports category of the team. Even during the 2010s, some editions were played coinciding with one of the team's home league matches. In 2020, the tournament was interrupted due to Covid-19 and resumed in 2022, recovering its autonomy from the league competition.

At all times, the tournament has continued to be organized linked to the events of the Melon Fair, being held on nearby dates or within the events of the Fair itself.

== The trophy ==
From the beginning, the tournament became popular for its trophy, shaped like a melon, alluding to the Fair and the main agricultural product of the municipality. Each year the trophy is different and is received by all participants, always maintaining the figure of the fruit as the main element. This characteristic has been a differential feature of the rest of the sports trophies and has been maintained to this day.

=== History ===
Year	Ed.	Champion	Score	Runner-up	Other comments
1970	1st	UD Collerense	0–0 (pp)	CE Constància	Semi-finalists, CD Margaritense and CD Vilafranca
1971	2nd	CD Margaritense	4–0	CD Murense	Semi-finalists, UD Collerense and CD Vilafranca
1972	3rd	UD Poblense	1–0	CD Murense	Semi-finalists, CD Margaritense and CD Vilafranca
1973	4th	CE Manacor	2–2 (pp)	UD Poblense	Semi-finalists, CE Campos and CD Vilafranca
1974	5th	CE Constància	0–0 (pp)	Atlètic Balears	Semi-finalists, UD Poblense and CD Vilafranca
1975	6th	CE Constància	2–1	Atlètic Balears	Semi-finalists, UD Poblense and UE Porreres
1976	7th	Atlètic Felanitx	1–0	UD Poblense	Semi-finalists, CE Constància and UE Porreres
1977	8th	CE Felanitx	2–1	UE Porreres	Semi-finalists, CE Manacor and CD Vilafranca
1978	Edition cancelled (a)				
1979	Not played following the incidents of the previous edition				
1980	9th	UD Poblense	4–0	Atlètic Balears	Semi-finalists, CE Constància and CD Vilafranca (b)
1981	10th	Porto Cristo FC	2–1	CE Felanitx	Semi-finalists, UE Petra and CD Vilafranca
1982	11th	CE Montuïri	3–2	CE Esporles	Semi-finalistes, CE Cardassar and CD Vilafranca
1983 – 1987 Not played
1988	12th	CE Montuïri	2–0	CE Sant Joan	Semi-finalists, Badia de Cala Millor and Vilafranca (no federated)
1989	13th	CF Vilafranca	4–1	UE Porreres	Single party
1990	14th	UE Petra	2–1	CF Vilafranca	Semi-finalists, CE Llucmajor and UE Porreres
1991	15th	CE Cardassar	2–0	CF Vilafranca	Semi-finalists, CE Llucmajor and UE Petra
1992	16th	CE Badia de Cala Millor	5–0	CF Vilafranca	Single party
1993	17th	RCD Mallorca B	2–0	CF Vilafranca	Semi-finalists, CE Cardassar and CE Montuïri
1994	18th	CE Espanya	6–0	CF Vilafranca	Semi-finalists, UE Petra and UD Poblense
1995	19th	CE Montuïri	2–0	CF Vilafranca	Semi-finalists, CE Cardassar and RCD Mallorca B
1996	20th	CE Campos	3–1	RCD Mallorca B	Semi-finalists, CE Felanitx and CF Vilafranca
1997	21st	CF Vilafranca	4–1	Atlètic Balears	Single party
1998	22nd	CF Vilafranca	1–0	CD Binissalem	Semi-finalists, CE Cardassar and CE Montuïri
1999	23rd	CE Manacor	2–2 (pp)	CF Vilafranca	Single party
2000	Not disputed for installation of artificial turf at the Municipal des Molí Nou				
2001	24th	CE Montuïri	2–1	CF Vilafranca	Semi-finalists, CE Felanitx and CE Santanyí
2002	25th	RCD Mallorca B	5–0	CF Vilafranca	Single party
2003	26th	CF Vilafranca, CE Montuïri and UD Poblense			3x1 triangular tournament
2004	27th	RCD Mallorca	1–0	CF Vilafranca	Single party
2005	28th	CE Manacor	3–0	CE Felanitx	Semi-finalists, CD Margaritense and CF Vilafranca
2006	29th	CE Manacor	1–0	CE Montuïri	Semi-finalists, CD Ferriolense and CF Vilafranca
2007	30th	CF Vilafranca	–	unknown	Single party
2008	31st	FB Santanyí	3–0	CF Vilafranca	League matchday
2009	32nd	CF Vilafranca	3–1	CF Santa Eugènia	Single party
2010	Not played				
2011	33rd	CF Vilafranca	4–2	CE Cardassar B	Single party
2012	34th	CF Vilafranca	2–2 (pp)	CC Son Macià	Single party
2013	35th	CF Vilafranca (veterans)	5–1	CF Vilafranca	Single party
2014	36th	Bunyola CF	2–2 (pp)	CF Vilafranca	League matchday
2015	37th	CF Vilafranca	–	unknown	Single party
2016	38th	CF Vilafranca	1–0	Pina CF	League matchday
2017	Not contested due to renovation of the artificial turf at Municipal des Molí Nou				
2018	39th	CF Vilafranca	1–0	CF Sóller B	League matchday
2019	40th	CF Vilafranca	7–3	CD Consell	League matchday
2020 – 2021 Not played due to the Covid-19 pandemic
2022	41st	UE Petra	5–1	CF Vilafranca	Single party
2023	42nd	Athletic Club de Montuïri	2–0	CF Vilafranca	Single party
2024	43rd	UE Porreres, Athletic Club de Montuïri and CF Vilafranca			3x1 triangular tournament
2025	44th	CF Vilafranca	4–0	Athletic Club de Montuïri	Single party
2026	45th	CE Artà	2–1	CF Vilafranca	Single party

(pp): resolved in the penalty shootout
(a) Following the riots of the public during the Vilafranca-Atlètic Balears match, the final and third and fourth place matches were suspended
(b) Resumption of the 1978 edition, played at the Miquel Nadal municipal field in Palma

== Titles by club ==
- 13 trophies: CF Vilafranca (1989, 1997, 1998, 2003, 2007, 2009, 2011, 2012, 2015, 2016, 2018, 2019 and 2025)
- 4 trophies: CE Manacor (1973, 1999, 2005 and 2006) and CE Montuïri (1982, 1988, 1995 and 2001)
- 2 trophies: UD Poblense (1972 and 1980), CE Constància (1974 and 1975), CE Felanitx (1976 and 1977), UE Petra (1990 and 2022) and RCD Mallorca B (1993 and 2002)
- 1 trophy: UD Collerense (1970), CD Margaritense (1971), CF Porto Cristo (1981), CE Cardassar (1991), CE Badia de Cala Millor (1992), CE Espanya (1994), CE Campos (1996), RCD Mallorca (2004), FB Santanyí (2008), CF Vilafranca (veterans) (2013), Bunyola CF (2014), Athletic Club de Montuïri (2023), UE Porreres (2024) and CE Artà (2026)
