= Francis Suárez (disambiguation) =

Francis Suárez is an American politician.

Francis Suárez may also refer to:

- Francis Suárez (footballer), Spanish footballer
- Francisco Suárez (1548–1617), sometimes called Francis, Spanish Jesuit priest, philosopher, and theologian
