= Tha'er Bawab =

Jordanian footballer

Personal information
- Full name: Tha'er Fayed Al Bawab
- Date of birth: 1 March 1985 (age 41)
- Place of birth: Amman, Jordan
- Height: 1.80 m (5 ft 11 in)
- Position: Forward

Youth career
- 1995–2003: Cornellà
- 2003–2004: Real Madrid

Senior career*
| Years | Team | Apps | (Gls) |
| 2004–2006 | Real Madrid C | 31 | (10) |
| 2006 | Real Madrid B | 0 | (0) |
| 2007 | Barcelona B | 13 | (3) |
| 2007–2008 | Hospitalet | 27 | (2) |
| 2009 | Alfaro | 14 | (3) |
| 2009–2010 | Moratalla | 28 | (3) |
| 2010 | Gloria Bistrița | 7 | (0) |
| 2011–2014 | Gaz Metan Mediaș | 83 | (24) |
| 2014 | Ittihad Kalba | 0 | (0) |
| 2014–2015 | Universitatea Craiova | 44 | (12) |
| 2016 | Steaua București | 8 | (1) |
| 2016–2017 | Umm Salal | 7 | (2) |
| 2017–2018 | Dinamo București | 13 | (0) |
| 2017–2018 | → Concordia Chiajna (loan) | 27 | (1) |
| 2018–2019 | Concordia Chiajna | 25 | (4) |
| 2019–2020 | Dunărea Călărași | 13 | (0) |
| 2021–2023 | Villaviciosa Odón | 48 | (12) |
| Total | | 388 | (77) |

International career
| 2005–2017 | Jordan | 29 | (6) |
- * Club domestic league appearances and goals

Tha'er Fayed Al Bawab (Arabic: ثائر فايد بواب; born 1 March 1985) is a Jordanian former professional footballer who played as a forward.

He spent most of his career in Spain and Romania.

== Club career ==
=== Early years and Real Madrid ===
Born in Amman to a Palestinian father and a Lebanese mother, Bawab's family moved to Catalonia, Spain when he was a child. He started playing for the youth teams of local UE Cornellà, leaving at the age of 18 to Real Madrid where he completed his development, and scoring 30 goals in his sole season with the Juvenil side.

In 2004, Bawab signed a professional contract with Real Madrid, and the club also agreed to pay a college scholarship for him, as he went on to make his senior debut with the third team in the Tercera División. At that time, talks had started where people compared his style of play to Zinedine Zidane (even though they did not play in the same position).

=== Barcelona, journeyman in Spain ===
Bawab split the 2006–07 season with Real Madrid Castilla – for whom he did not appear officially – and another reserve team, FC Barcelona B, scoring three goals for the latter as both sides suffered relegation (the former in the Segunda División, the latter in the Segunda División B).

In the following three seasons, he competed in the country's third tier, being relegated with all the clubs – CE L'Hospitalet, CD Alfaro (which he joined in January 2009) and Moratalla CF.

=== Romania ===
Bawab signed a two-year contract with ACF Gloria 1922 Bistriţa in late June 2010. Midway through the season, as his team would eventually suffer relegation, he joined fellow Romanian Liga I side CS Gaz Metan Mediaş.

On 4 August 2011, Bawab scored two goals against 1. FSV Mainz 05 in the last qualifying round of the UEFA Europa League, one in each leg as Gaz Metan eventually won on penalties. On 26 September, he added two more in a 2–1 league home win over FCM Târgu Mureș.

In September 2014, free agent Bawab moved to CS Universitatea Craiova also in Romania's top flight. He remained in the country the following years safe for a very brief spell in the Qatar Stars League with Umm Salal SC, representing FC Steaua București, FC Dinamo București, CS Concordia Chiajna and FC Dunărea Călărași.

Bawab retired in 2023 aged 38, his last club being Spanish amateurs AD Villaviciosa de Odón. Still as an active player, he worked as a taxi driver.

== International career ==
Bawab made his debut for Jordan in a friendly with Norway on 28 January 2005, which ended 0–0. He made six appearances for the national team in the 2010 FIFA World Cup qualifiers, scoring once.

== Career statistics ==
=== Club ===
| Club | Season | League | | | National Cup (Note: Includes Copa del Rey, Cupa României) | | League Cup (Note: Includes Cupa Ligii) | | Continental | | Other | | Total | |
| Club | Season | Division | Apps | Goals | Apps | Goals | Apps | Goals | Apps | Goals | Apps | Goals | Apps | Goals |
|---|---|---|---|---|---|---|---|---|---|---|---|---|---|---|
| Real Madrid C | 2004–05 | Tercera División | 8 | 1 | — | | — | | — | | — | | 8 | 1 |
| Real Madrid C | 2005–06 | Tercera División | 23 | 9 | — | | — | | — | | — | | 23 | 9 |
| Real Madrid C | Total | | 31 | 10 | — | | — | | — | | — | | 31 | 10 |
| Real Madrid B | 2006–07 | Segunda División | 0 | 0 | — | | — | | — | | — | | 0 | 0 |
| Barcelona B | 2006–07 | Segunda División B | 13 | 3 | — | | — | | — | | — | | 13 | 3 |
| Hospitalet | 2007–08 | Segunda División B | 26 | 2 | 1 | 0 | — | | — | | — | | 27 | 2 |
| Hospitalet | 2008–09 | Tercera División | 1 | 0 | — | | — | | — | | — | | 1 | 0 |
| Hospitalet | Total | | 27 | 2 | 1 | 0 | — | | — | | — | | 28 | 2 |
| Alfaro | 2008–09 | Segunda División B | 14 | 3 | 0 | 0 | — | | — | | — | | 14 | 3 |
| Moratalla | 2009–10 | Segunda División B | 28 | 3 | 0 | 0 | — | | — | | — | | 28 | 3 |
| Gloria Bistriţa | 2010–11 | Liga I | 7 | 0 | 0 | 0 | — | | — | | — | | 7 | 0 |
| Gaz Metan Mediaș | 2010–11 | Liga I | 14 | 2 | — | | — | | — | | — | | 14 | 2 |
| Gaz Metan Mediaș | 2011–12 | Liga I | 28 | 8 | 3 | 0 | — | | 6 (Note: Appearances in UEFA Europa League) | 2 | — | | 37 | 10 |
| Gaz Metan Mediaș | 2012–13 | Liga I | 25 | 10 | 1 | 1 | — | | — | | — | | 26 | 11 |
| Gaz Metan Mediaș | 2013–14 | Liga I | 16 | 4 | 0 | 0 | — | | — | | — | | 16 | 4 |
| Gaz Metan Mediaș | Total | | 83 | 24 | 4 | 1 | — | | 6 | 2 | — | | 93 | 27 |
| Universitatea Craiova | 2014–15 | Liga I | 25 | 9 | 2 | 0 | — | | — | | — | | 27 | 9 |
| Universitatea Craiova | 2015–16 | Liga I | 19 | 3 | 0 | 0 | 0 | 0 | — | | — | | 19 | 3 |
| Universitatea Craiova | Total | | 44 | 12 | 2 | 0 | 0 | 0 | — | | — | | 46 | 12 |
| Steaua București | 2015–16 | Liga I | 8 | 1 | 0 | 0 | 1 | 2 | — | | — | | 9 | 3 |
| Umm Salal | 2016–17 | Qatar Stars League | 7 | 2 | — | | — | | — | | — | | 7 | 2 |
| Dinamo București | 2016–17 | Liga I | 12 | 0 | 0 | 0 | 1 | 0 | — | | — | | 13 | 0 |
| Dinamo București | 2017–18 | Liga I | 1 | 0 | — | | — | | — | | — | | 1 | 0 |
| Dinamo București | Total | | 13 | 0 | 0 | 0 | 1 | 0 | — | | — | | 14 | 0 |
| Concordia Chiajna (loan) | 2017–18 | Liga I | 27 | 1 | 0 | 0 | — | | — | | — | | 27 | 1 |
| Concordia Chiajna | 2018–19 | Liga I | 25 | 4 | 0 | 0 | — | | — | | — | | 25 | 4 |
| Concordia Chiajna | Total | | 52 | 5 | 0 | 0 | — | | — | | — | | 52 | 5 |
| Dunărea Călărași | 2019–20 | Liga I | 13 | 0 | 0 | 0 | — | | — | | — | | 13 | 0 |
| Villaviciosa Odón | 2021–22 | Tercera División RFEF | 30 | 6 | — | | — | | — | | — | | 30 | 6 |
| Villaviciosa Odón | 2022–23 | Preferente de Madrid | 18 | 6 | — | | — | | — | | — | | 18 | 6 |
| Villaviciosa Odón | Total | | 48 | 12 | — | | — | | — | | — | | 48 | 12 |
| Career total | | | 388 | 77 | 7 | 1 | 2 | 2 | 6 | 2 | – | – | 403 | 82 |

=== International ===
Appearances and goals by national team and year
| National team | Year | Apps | Goals |
|---|---|---|---|
| Jordan | 2005 | 1 | 0 |
| Jordan | 2006 | 0 | 0 |
| Jordan | 2007 | 2 | 0 |
| Jordan | 2008 | 6 | 1 |
| Jordan | 2009 | 0 | 0 |
| Jordan | 2010 | 0 | 0 |
| Jordan | 2011 | 2 | 0 |
| Jordan | 2012 | 5 | 1 |
| Jordan | 2013 | 4 | 0 |
| Jordan | 2014 | 4 | 3 |
| Jordan | 2015 | 1 | 0 |
| Jordan | 2016 | 1 | 0 |
| Jordan | 2017 | 3 | 1 |
| Total | | 29 | 6 |

Scores and results list Jordan's goal tally first, score column indicates score after each Bawab goal.

List of international goals scored by Tha'er Bawab
| # | Date | Venue | Opponent | Score | Result | Competition |
|---|---|---|---|---|---|---|
| 1 | 26 March 2008 | Olympic Stadium, Ashgabat, Turkmenistan | Turkmenistan | 2–0 | 2–0 | 2010 World Cup qualification |
| 2 | 16 October 2012 | Sultan Qaboos Sports Complex, Muscat, Oman | Oman | 1–2 | 1–2 | 2014 World Cup qualification |
| 3 | 4 February 2014 | Jalan Besar, Kallang, Singapore | Singapore | 1–0 | 3–1 | 2015 Asian Cup qualification |
| 4 | 5 March 2014 | International Stadium, Amman, Jordan | Syria | 1–0 | 2–1 | 2015 Asian Cup qualification |
| 5 | 5 March 2014 | International Stadium, Amman, Jordan | Syria | 2–0 | 2–1 | 2015 Asian Cup qualification |
| 6 | 23 March 2017 | King Abdullah II, Amman, Jordan | Hong Kong | 4–0 | 4–0 | Friendly |

== Honours ==
Real Madrid C

- Tercera División: 2005–06

Steaua București

- Cupa Ligii: 2015–16

Dinamo București

- Cupa Ligii: 2016–17
