= Axier Intxaurraga =

Spanish footballer and manager

Axier
Personal information
- Full name: Axier Intxaurraga Mendia
- Date of birth: 11 April 1968 (age 58)
- Place of birth: Berriz, Spain
- Height: 1.76 m (5 ft 9 in)
- Position: Defender

Senior career*
Years	Team	Apps	(Gls)
- Durango
- Arenas
1990–1993	Barakaldo	104	(4)
1993–1994	Eibar	36	(0)
1994–1997	Las Palmas	77	(0)
1997–1998	Málaga	33	(0)
1998–2000	Elche	69	(0)
2000–2001	Albacete	35	(0)
2001–2002	Ciudad Murcia	30	(1)
2002–2004	Algeciras	47	(0)
2004–2006	Castillo	65	(0)
Total		496	(5)

Managerial career
- 2006–2009: Castillo
- 2009–2011: Durango
- 2011–2013: Amorebieta
- 2014–2015: Barakaldo
- 2015–2016: Portugalete
- * Club domestic league appearances and goals

Axier Intxaurraga Mendia (born 11 April 1968), simply known as Axier, is a Spanish football manager and former player who played as a defender.

== Playing career ==
Axier was born in Berriz, Biscay, Basque Country, and played for local sides SCD Durango and Arenas Club de Getxo before joining Segunda División B side Barakaldo CF in 1990. In 1993, after three seasons as a starter, he signed for SD Eibar in Segunda División.

Axier made his professional debut on 5 September 1993, starting in a 2–0 home win against Palamós CF. Despite being a regular starter for the side, he moved to UD Las Palmas in 1994, and helped in their promotion to the second division in 1996.

Axier subsequently achieved promotion to the second level with Málaga CF, Elche CF and Algeciras CF, also playing for Albacete Balompié in the category in the 2000–01 season. He also represented third division teams Ciudad de Murcia and Castillo CF, retiring with the latter in 2006 at the age of 37 after the club's relegation to Tercera División.

== Coaching career ==
Immediately after retiring, Axier became a manager at his last club Castillo. In 2009, he was named in charge of another club he represented as a player, Durango also in the fourth division.

On 3 June 2011, Axier was appointed manager of third level side SD Amorebieta, and led the club to the play-offs in his first season. He left in 2013, and took over Barakaldo on 1 May 2014.

On 24 November 2015, Axier was named at the helm of Club Portugalete in the third tier, but failed to avoid relegation at the end of the campaign.
