= Rodolfo Filipe =

Portuguese footballer

Rodolfo
Personal information
- Full name: Rodolfo Filipe António Ricardo
- Date of birth: 20 June 1982 (age 44)
- Place of birth: Torres Vedras, Portugal
- Height: 1.84 m (6 ft 1/2 in)
- Position: Centre back

Youth career
- 1995–2001: Lourinhanense

Senior career*
Years	Team	Apps	(Gls)
2001–2003	Lourinhanense		
2003–2005	Alverca	26	(0)
2005–2006	Barreirense	13	(0)
2006	Linense		
2007–2008	Díter Zafra		
2008–2010	Cerro Reyes	28	(0)
2010–2014	Extremadura	120	(14)
2014–2015	Badajoz	1	(0)
- * Club domestic league appearances and goals as of 20 November 2016

Rodolfo Filipe António Ricardo (born 20 June 1982 in Torres Vedras, Lisbon District), known simply as Rodolfo, is a Portuguese footballer who plays as a central defender.
