= CF Vilafranca =

Spanish football team

Vilafranca
- Full name: Club de Fútbol Vilafranca
- Founded: 1989; 37 years ago
- Ground: Es Molí Nou, Vilafranca de Bonany, Balearic Islands, Spain
- Capacity: 1,000
- Chairman: Antoni Oliver Blanch
- Manager: Andrés Salinas
- League: Primera Regional – Mallorca – Group A
- 2025–26: Primera Regional – Mallorca – Group A, 8th of 18
| Home colours | Away colours |

Club de Fútbol Vilafranca is a football team based in Vilafranca de Bonany in the autonomous community of Balearic Islands. Founded in 1989, they play in the Primera Regional – Mallorca – Group A. He had a history with Club Deportivo Vilafranca, founded in 1969 and disappeared in 1983.

His best period took place between 1997 and 2007, when he played ten seasons in Tercera División, winning the championship in 2002–03 season.

The club is the organizer of Trofeu del Meló (Melon Trophy), one of the oldest pre-season tournaments in Mallorca, which has been held since 1970.

== Season to season ==
| Season | Tier | Division | Place | Copa del Rey |
|---|---|---|---|---|
| 1989–90 | 8 | 3ª Reg. | 4th | |
| 1990–91 | 8 | 3ª Reg. | 1st | |
| 1991–92 | 7 | 2ª Reg. | 13th | |
| 1992–93 | 7 | 2ª Reg. | 5th | |
| 1993–94 | 6 | 1ª Reg. | 8th | |
| 1994–95 | 6 | 1ª Reg. | 12th | |
| 1995–96 | 6 | 1ª Reg. | 1st | |
| 1996–97 | 5 | Reg. Pref. | 1st | |
| 1997–98 | 4 | 3ª | 4th | |
| 1998–99 | 4 | 3ª | 6th | |
| 1999–2000 | 4 | 3ª | 8th | |
| 2000–01 | 4 | 3ª | 3rd | |
| 2001–02 | 4 | 3ª | 4th | |
| 2002–03 | 4 | 3ª | 1st | |
| 2003–04 | 4 | 3ª | 4th | |
| 2004–05 | 4 | 3ª | 5th | |
| 2005–06 | 4 | 3ª | 17th | |
| 2006–07 | 4 | 3ª | 16th | |
| 2007–08 | 6 | 1ª Reg. | 20th | |

| Season | Tier | Division | Place | Copa del Rey |
|---|---|---|---|---|
| 2008–09 | 7 | 2ª Reg. | 19th | |
| 2009–10 | 8 | 3ª Reg. | 8th | |
| 2010–11 | 8 | 3ª Reg. | 14th | |
| 2011–12 | 8 | 3ª Reg. | 9th | |
| 2012–13 | 8 | 3ª Reg. | 3rd | |
| 2013–14 | 7 | 2ª Reg. | 14th | |
| 2014–15 | 7 | 2ª Reg. | 15th | |
| 2015–16 | 7 | 2ª Reg. | 17th | |
| 2016–17 | 7 | 2ª Reg. | 18th | |
| 2017–18 | 7 | 2ª Reg. | 4th | |
| 2018–19 | 7 | 2ª Reg. | 3rd | |
| 2019–20 | 6 | 1ª Reg. | 7th | |
| 2020–21 | 6 | 1ª Reg. | 10th | |
| 2021–22 | DNP | | | |
| 2022–23 | 8 | 2ª Reg. | 2nd | |
| 2023–24 | 7 | 1ª Reg. | 12th | |
| 2024–25 | 8 | 1ª Reg. | 5th | |
| 2025–26 | 8 | 1ª Reg. | 8th | |
| 2026–27 | 8 | 1ª Reg. | | |

- 10 seasons in Tercera División
