= CF La Unión =

Spanish football club

La Unión
- Full name: Club de Fútbol La Unión
- Founded: 1969 (as Caravaca CF); 2011 (as CF La Unión)
- Dissolved: 2012
- Ground: Polideportivo Municipal, La Unión, Murcia, Spain
- Capacity: 3,500
- 2011–12: 2ªB – Group 4, 18th – relegated
| Home colours | Away colours |

Caravaca Club de Fútbol , unofficial known as Club de Fútbol La Unión was a Spanish football team based in La Unión, Murcia, in the Region of Murcia. Founded in 2011, it played its only ever season (2011–12) in Segunda División B – Group 4, holding home games at Polideportivo Municipal de La Unión, with a capacity of 3,000 seats.

== History ==
Club de Fútbol La Unión was founded in 1969 as Caravaca CF. In late July 2011, the club moved to neighbouring La Unión, Murcia.

A few days later, the mayor of Caravaca and several supporters protested to the Royal Spanish Football Federation that the move was illegal.

In June, 2012, La Unión was doubly relegated; from Segunda División B to Preferente Autonómica due to non-payments of wages to their players being later folded.

== Season to season ==
| Season | Tier | Division | Place | Copa del Rey |
|---|---|---|---|---|
| 2011–12 | 3 | 2ªB | 18th | |

- 1 season in Segunda División B
