= Miroslav Radulović =

Slovenian footballer

Personal information
- Full name: Miroslav Radulović
- Date of birth: 6 September 1984 (age 42)
- Place of birth: Novo Mesto, SFR Yugoslavia
- Height: 1.73 m (5 ft 8 in)
- Position: Defender

Youth career
- Krka
- Factor

Senior career*
Years	Team	Apps	(Gls)
2001–2004	Interblock	52	(5)
2005	Krka	3	(0)
2006–2007	Koper	35	(0)
2007–2008	Celje	17	(0)
2009–2010	Moratalla	12	(0)
2010	Nybergsund IL-Trysil	25	(0)
2011	Celje	25	(0)
2012–2013	Krka	15	(0)
2015	ASKÖ St.Michael/Bleiburg	14	(0)
2015–2017	SV St.Jakob/Rosental	24	(1)
- * Club domestic league appearances and goals as of 7 December 2013

Miroslav Radulovič (born 6 September 1984) is a Slovenian former footballer who played as a defender.
