= Nauzet Fernández =

Spanish footballer

Nauzet
Personal information
- Full name: Nauzet Fernández Herrera
- Date of birth: 22 April 1978 (age 48)
- Place of birth: Santa Cruz de Tenerife, Spain
- Height: 1.77 m (5 ft 9 1/2 in)
- Position: Midfielder

Youth career
- Tenerife

Senior career*
| Years | Team | Apps | (Gls) |
| 1995–1997 | Tenerife B | 21 | (3) |
| 1997 | Pájara Playas | 4 | (0) |
| 1998 | Rayo Vallecano B | | |
| 1998–1999 | Fuenlabrada | 24 | (0) |
| 1999–2000 | Lourinhanense | 22 | (1) |
| 2000–2001 | Sporting CP B | 31 | (5) |
| 2001–2002 | Campomaiorense | 24 | (1) |
| 2002 | Marco | 5 | (0) |
| 2003–2004 | CD Badajoz | 12 | (1) |
| 2004–2005 | Olhanense | 12 | (1) |
| 2005–2006 | Cerro Reyes | | |
| 2006–2007 | Sabadell | 39 | (3) |
| 2007–2009 | Terrassa | 33 | (1) |
| 2009–2010 | Cerro Reyes | 33 | (6) |
| 2010–2011 | Sporting Villanueva | 33 | (8) |
| 2011–2013 | Arroyo | 50 | (3) |
| 2013–2014 | Badajoz CF | 32 | (11) |
| 2014–2015 | Extremadura | | |
| 2016–2017 | Jerez | 11 | (2) |
| Total | | 386 | (46) |
- * Club domestic league appearances and goals

Nauzet Fernández Herrera (born 22 April 1978), known simply as Nauzet, is a Spanish former footballer who played as a midfielder.

== Club career ==
Nauzet was born in Santa Cruz de Tenerife, Canary Islands. An unsuccessful youth graduate at local CD Tenerife, he went on to play in both his country and Portugal, appearing for various clubs in the nations' second and third divisions.

Nauzet's professional career was spent at the service of CD Badajoz, S.C. Campomaiorense, F.C. Marco and S.C. Olhanense, totalling 53 games and three goals over the course of four seasons. He scored his only goal in the Segunda División on 16 March 2003 as a Badajoz player, from a free kick in a 1–1 home draw against Levante UD.
