= RUD Carolinense =

Spanish football club

Carolinense
- Full name: Real Unión Deportiva Carolinense
- Founded: 1963
- Dissolved: 2008
- Ground: Ramón Palacios, La Carolina, Andalusia, Spain
- Capacity: 3,000
- Manager: Coco
- 2007–08: Primera Andaluza – Group 3, 15th of 18
Home colours	Away colours

Real Unión Deportiva Carolinense was a Spanish football team based in La Carolina, in the autonomous community of Andalusia. Founded in 1963, it was dissolved in 2008, and held home matches at the Estadio Municipal Ramón Palacios, with a capacity of 3,000 people.

== History ==
Founded in 1963 as Unión Deportiva Carolinense, the club was renamed Agrupación Deportiva Carolinense in 1968, but changed name to Real Unión Deportiva Carolinense four years later. In 1977, benefitting from the creation of the Segunda División B, the new third division, the club achieved a first-ever promotion to Tercera División.

Carolinense returned to the fourth division in 2002, and reached the 2003 Tercera División play-offs, finishing one point shy of promotion. Relegated in 2007, the club spent one season in Primera Andaluza before being dissolved in the following year; shortly after, Carolinense CD was founded.

== Season to season ==
Season	Tier	Division	Place	Copa del Rey
1963–1968	—	Regional	—	
1967–68	5	2ª Reg.	5th	
1968–69	4	1ª Reg.	14th	
1969–70	5	2ª Reg.	8th	
1970–71	5	2ª Reg.	9th	
1971–72	5	2ª Reg.	5th	
1972–73	5	2ª Reg.		
1973–74	5	2ª Reg.		
1974–75	5	2ª Reg.	14th	
1975–76	5	1ª Reg.	1st	
1976–77	4	Reg. Pref.	4th	
1977–78	4	3ª	7th	
1978–79	4	3ª	17th	
1979–80	4	3ª	18th	Second round
1980–81	4	3ª	14th	
1981–82	4	3ª	16th	
1982–83	4	3ª	18th	
1983–84	5	Reg. Pref.	6th	
1984–85	5	Reg. Pref.	3rd	
1985–86	5	Reg. Pref.	20th	

Season	Tier	Division	Place	Copa del Rey
1986–87	5	Reg. Pref.	3rd	
1987–88	5	Reg. Pref.	6th	
1988–89	5	Reg. Pref.	4th	
1989–90	5	Reg. Pref.	9th	
1990–91	5	Reg. Pref.	2nd	
1991–92	5	Reg. Pref.	7th	
1992–93	5	Reg. Pref.	15th	
1993–94	5	Reg. Pref.	11th	
1994–95	5	Reg. Pref.	8th	
1995–96	5	Reg. Pref.	8th	
1996–97	5	Reg. Pref.	11th	
1997–98	5	Reg. Pref.	8th	
1998–99	5	Reg. Pref.	2nd	
1999–2000	5	Reg. Pref.	2nd	
2000–01	5	Reg. Pref.	1st	
2001–02	5	Reg. Pref.	2nd	
2002–03	4	3ª	3rd	
2003–04	4	3ª	6th	
2004–05	4	3ª	10th	
2005–06	4	3ª	17th	

Season	Tier	Division	Place	Copa del Rey
2006–07	4	3ª	18th	
2007–08	5	1ª And.	15th	

- 11 seasons in Tercera División
