= Golo (footballer) =

Spanish footballer

Personal information
- Full name: Óscar Santor Martínez
- Date of birth: 3 April 1978 (age 48)
- Place of birth: Vitoria, Spain
- Height: 1.72 m (5 ft 7 1/2 in)
- Position: Attacking midfielder

Senior career*
Years	Team	Apps	(Gls)
1998–1999	Eibar	9	(1)
1999	Badajoz	1	(0)
2000	Terrassa	13	(2)
2000–2001	Toledo	22	(1)
2001–2003	Ourense	65	(5)
2003–2004	Mérida	35	(1)
2004–2005	Jerez	31	(6)
2005–2011	Cerro Reyes		
2011–2012	Extremadura	?	(15)
2012–2013	Don Benito	?	(6)
- * Club domestic league appearances and goals

Óscar Santor Martínez (born 3 April 1978 in Vitoria-Gasteiz, Álava), known as Golo, is a Spanish retired professional footballer who played as an attacking midfielder.
