= Caravaca CF =

Caravaca
- Full name: Caravaca Club de Fútbol
- Founded: 1 November 1967
- Dissolved: 2012 (as CF La Unión)
- Ground: Antonio Martínez El Morao, Caravaca de la Cruz, Murcia, Spain
- Capacity: 2,000
- 2010–11: 2ªB - Group 4, 11th
Home colours	Away colours

Caravaca Club de Fútbol was a Spanish football team based in Caravaca de la Cruz, in the Region of Murcia. Founded in 1967 and dissolved in 2011, it held home games at Estadio Antonio Martínez El Morao, with a capacity of 2,000 spectators.

== History ==
Caravaca Club de Fútbol was founded on 1 November 1967 (after previous denominations as Deportiva Caravaqueña and Caravaca Football Club), first reaching Tercera División in 1980, and lasting six seasons.

The club returned to level four in 1991, consolidating in that division in the following decades; in the 2008–09 season, Caravaca led all teams in the group at 115 goals scored and, after defeating CD Ourense in the promotion playoffs, its first promotion to level three.

After the 2010–11 season, the club was forced to dissolve due to economic problems, and its place was bought by CF La Unión.

== Season to season ==
Season	Tier	Division	Place	Copa del Rey
1968–69	5	2ª Reg.	3rd	
1969–70	5	2ª Reg.	5th	
1970–71	5	2ª Reg.	2nd	
1971–72	5	1ª Reg.	8th	
1972–73	5	1ª Reg.	8th	
1973–74	5	1ª Reg.	11th	
1974–75	5	1ª Reg.	9th	
1975–76	5	1ª Reg.	14th	
1976–77	5	1ª Reg.	7th	
1977–78	6	1ª Reg.	2nd	
1978–79	5	Reg. Pref.	5th	
1979–80	5	Reg. Pref.	3rd	
1980–81	4	3ª	6th	
1981–82	4	3ª	7th	
1982–83	4	3ª	17th	
1983–84	4	3ª	14th	
1984–85	4	3ª	10th	
1985–86	4	3ª	19th	
1986–87	5	Reg. Pref.	12th	
1987–88	5	Reg. Pref.	8th	

Season	Tier	Division	Place	Copa del Rey
1988–89	5	Reg. Pref.	11th	
1989–90	5	Reg. Pref.	7th	
1990–91	5	Reg. Pref.	3rd	
1991–92	4	3ª	5th	
1992–93	4	3ª	2nd	
1993–94	4	3ª	4th	
1994–95	4	3ª	5th	
1995–96	4	3ª	8th	
1996–97	4	3ª	5th	
1997–98	4	3ª	4th	
1998–99	4	3ª	9th	
1999–2000	4	3ª	16th	
2000–01	4	3ª	15th	
2001–02	4	3ª	7th	
2002–03	4	3ª	7th	
2003–04	4	3ª	4th	
2004–05	4	3ª	10th	
2005–06	4	3ª	14th	
2006–07	4	3ª	3rd	
2007–08	4	3ª	4th	

Season	Tier	Division	Place	Copa del Rey
2008–09	4	3ª	1st	
2009–10	3	2ª B	11th	
2010–11	3	2ª B	11th	

- 2 seasons in Segunda División B
- 24 seasons in Tercera División

== Last squad (2010–11) ==
Note: Flags indicate national team as defined under FIFA eligibility rules; some limited exceptions apply. Players may hold more than one non-FIFA nationality.

No.	Pos.	Nation	Player
—	GK	(Spain) ESP	Alex
—	GK	(Spain) ESP	Cabaco Franco
—	DF	(Spain) ESP	Atila
—	DF	(Spain) ESP	Dioni
—	DF	(Spain) ESP	Gurtubai Garay
—	DF	(Spain) ESP	Miguel Sánchez
—	DF	(Spain) ESP	San José
—	MF	(Spain) ESP	Javier De la Rosa
—	MF	(Spain) ESP	Emilio Rodríguez
—	MF	(Spain) ESP	José Florete

No.	Pos.	Nation	Player
—	MF	(Spain) ESP	Israel Alcazar
—	MF	(Spain) ESP	Julio Piñero
—	MF	(Spain) ESP	Julio César Cardozo
—	MF	(Spain) ESP	Micro
—	FW	(Spain) ESP	Angel Gómez
—	FW	(Spain) ESP	Fran Alemán
—	FW	(Spain) ESP	Noel Antonio
—	FW	(Spain) ESP	Parches
—	FW	(Spain) ESP	Petu
—	FW	(Spain) ESP	Pipa Gozalbes

== Famous players ==
- (Equatorial Guinea) (Spain) Fernando Obama
- (Equatorial Guinea) (Spain) Iván Zarandona
- (Spain) Antonio Martín
- (Spain) Juan Antonio Chesa
