= CE Artà =

Artà
- Full name: Club Esportiu Artà
- Founded: 1945
- Ground: Ses Pesqueres, Artà, Spain
- Capacity: 1,500
- Chairman: (Catalonia) Juan F. Murillo
- Manager: (Catalonia) Sebastià Massanet Font
- League: Primera Regional – Mallorca – Group A
- 2024–25: Primera Regional – Mallorca – Group A, 3rd of 18
Home colours	Away colours

Club Esportiu Artà is a football team based in Artà, Illes Balears. Founded in 1945, the team plays in Primera Regional – Mallorca – Group A. The club's home ground is Ses Pesqueres.

== Season to season ==
Season	Tier	Division	Place	Copa del Rey
1945–46	5	2ª Reg.	2nd	
1946–47	5	2ª Reg.	1st	
1947–48	5	2ª Reg.	2nd	
1948–49	4	1ª Reg.	3rd	
1949–50	DNP			
1950–51	DNP			
1951–52	DNP			
1952–53	5	2ª Reg.	1st	
1953–54	4	1ª Reg.	14th	
1954–55	4	1ª Reg.	8th	
1955–56	4	1ª Reg.	5th	
1956–57	4	1ª Reg.	3rd	
1957–58	4	1ª Reg.	10th	
1958–1967	DNP			
1967–68	5	2ª Reg.	1st	
1968–69	5	2ª Reg.	1st	
1969–70	4	1ª Reg.	11th	
1970–71	4	1ª Reg.	14th	
1971–72	DNP			
1972–73	7	3ª Reg.	1st	

Season	Tier	Division	Place	Copa del Rey
1973–74	6	2ª Reg.	9th	
1974–75	6	2ª Reg.	11th	
1975–76	6	2ª Reg.	3rd	
1976–77	5	1ª Reg.	4th	
1977–78	5	Reg. Pref.	12th	
1978–79	5	Reg. Pref.	11th	
1979–80	5	Reg. Pref.	12th	
1980–81	5	Reg. Pref.	4th	
1981–82	5	Reg. Pref.	5th	
1982–83	4	3ª	9th	
1983–84	4	3ª	16th	
1984–85	4	3ª	19th	
1985–86	5	Reg. Pref.	6th	
1986–87	5	Reg. Pref.	8th	
1987–88	5	Reg. Pref.	17th	
1988–89	5	Reg. Pref.	14th	
1989–90	5	Reg. Pref.	20th	
1990–91	6	1ª Reg.	10th	
1991–92	6	1ª Reg.	15th	
1992–93	6	1ª Reg.	3rd	

Season	Tier	Division	Place	Copa del Rey
1993–94	5	Reg. Pref.	20th	
1994–95	DNP			
1995–96	DNP			
1996–97	8	3ª Reg.	2nd	
1997–98	7	2ª Reg.	1st	
1998–99	6	1ª Reg.	5th	
1999–2000	6	1ª Reg.	5th	
2000–01	6	1ª Reg.	12th	
2001–02	6	1ª Reg.	11th	
2002–03	6	1ª Reg.	2nd	
2003–04	5	Reg. Pref.	7th	
2004–05	5	Reg. Pref.	11th	
2005–06	5	Reg. Pref.	6th	
2006–07	5	Reg. Pref.	6th	
2007–08	4	3ª	17th	
2008–09	4	3ª	19th	
2009–10	5	Reg. Pref.	2nd	
2010–11	5	Reg. Pref.	18th	
2011–12	5	Reg. Pref.	20th	
2012–13	6	1ª Reg.	17th	

Season	Tier	Division	Place	Copa del Rey
2013–14	6	1ª Reg.	16th	
2014–15	6	1ª Reg.	15th	
2015–16	6	1ª Reg.	19th	
2016–17	7	2ª Reg.	20th	
2017–18	8	3ª Reg.	13th	
2018–19	8	3ª Reg.	1st	
2019–20	7	2ª Reg.	1st	
2020–21	6	1ª Reg.	1st	
2021–22	6	Reg. Pref.	16th	
2022–23	6	Reg. Pref.	16th	
2023–24	7	1ª Reg.	6th	
2024–25	8	1ª Reg.	2nd	
2025–26	8	1ª Reg.		

- 5 seasons in Tercera División
