= Moratalla CF =

Moratalla
- Full name: Moratalla Club de Fútbol
- Founded: 1976
- Dissolved: 2011
- Ground: Casa Felipe, Moratalla, Murcia, Spain
- Capacity: 3,000
- 2010–11: 3ª – Group 13, 15th
Home colours	Away colours

Moratalla Club de Fútbol was a Spanish football team based in Moratalla, in the Region of Murcia. Founded in 1976 and dissolved in 2011, it held home matches at Estadio Casa Felipe, with a capacity of 3,000 seats.

== History ==
Moratalla Club de Fútbol was founded in 1976 as Club de Fútbol Juventud Moratallera, moving to its current name two years later. It first appeared in national category ten years later, competing in Group XIII in the fourth division.

In 2008–09, the club made its first presence in the third level promotion playoffs, being ousted by CD Alcalá 0–2 on aggregate. However, after Lorca Deportiva CF was relegated for lack of payment to its players, Moratalla took its place, making its first appearance in the category on 30 August 2009, in a 0–2 away loss against Real Murcia Imperial, and eventually being relegated back.

The team was dissolved after the 2010–11 season due to economic problems, and its place was bought by a recently founded club, FC Jumilla.

== Season to season ==
Season	Tier	Division	Place	Copa del Rey
1976–77	6	2ª Reg.	14th	
1977–78	7	2ª Reg.	8th	
1978–79	7	2ª Reg.	8th	
1979–80	7	2ª Reg.	9th	
1980–81	7	2ª Reg.	1st	
1981–82	6	1ª Reg.	7th	
1982–83	6	1ª Reg.	8th	
1983–84	6	1ª Reg.	6th	
1984–85	6	1ª Reg.	10th	
1985–86	6	1ª Reg.	11th	
1986–87	6	1ª Reg.	2nd	
1987–88	5	Reg. Pref.	8th	
1988–89	5	Reg. Pref.	2nd	
1989–90	4	3ª	20th	
1990–91	5	Reg. Pref.	10th	
1991–92	5	Reg. Pref.	20th	

Season	Tier	Division	Place	Copa del Rey
1992–93	7	2ª Reg.	7th	
1993–94	6	1ª Reg.	10th	
1994–95	DNP			
1995–96	6	1ª Reg.	8th	
1996–2000	DNP			
2000–01	6	1ª Terr.	9th	
2001–02	6	1ª Terr.	5th	
2002–03	5	Terr. Pref.	18th	
2003–04	6	1ª Terr.	3rd	
2004–05	5	Terr. Pref.	4th	
2005–06	4	3ª	17th	
2006–07	4	3ª	10th	
2007–08	4	3ª	9th	
2008–09	4	3ª	2nd	
2009–10	3	2ª B	17th	
2010–11	4	3ª	15th	

- 1 season in Segunda División B
- 6 seasons in Tercera División

== Famous players ==
- (Equatorial Guinea) (Spain) Fernando Obama
- (Jordan) Tha'er Bawab
- (Slovenia) Miroslav Radulovič
