= Francis Suárez (footballer) =

Spanish footballer (born 1987)

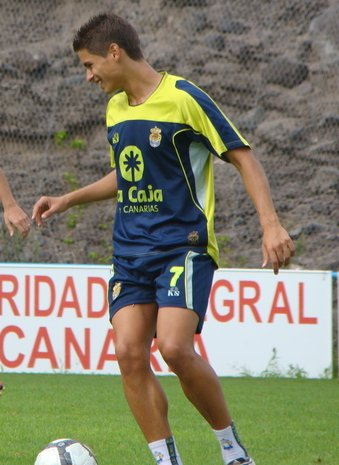
- Suárez training with Las Palmas in 2009

Personal information
- Full name: Francisco Manuel Suárez Arteaga
- Date of birth: 6 January 1987 (age 39)
- Place of birth: Las Palmas, Spain
- Height: 1.81 m (5 ft 11 in)
- Position: Midfielder

Youth career
- Las Palmas

Senior career*
Years	Team	Apps	(Gls)
2005–2007	Las Palmas B	33	(12)
2005–2006	→ Castillo (loan)	28	(2)
2007–2013	Las Palmas	76	(2)
2010–2011	→ Ponferradina (loan)	7	(1)
2014	Inter Turku	20	(2)
2016	Izarra	12	(2)
2016–2017	Songkhla United	25	(6)
2018–2019	Izarra	16	(0)
Total		217	(27)
- * Club domestic league appearances and goals

Francisco "Francis" Manuel Suárez Arteaga (born 6 January 1987) is a Spanish former professional footballer who played as a midfielder.

== Club career ==
Born in Las Palmas, Canary Islands, Suárez came through local Las Palmas' youth system, making his senior debut with neighbouring Castillo whilst on loan. Upon his return, he then spent one full season with the B team in the Tercera División. On 7 January 2007, he made his first official appearance for the main squad, coming on as a 70th-minute substitute in a 2–2 Segunda División away draw against Salamanca.

In the following seven campaigns, with the club always in the second tier, Suárez acted almost exclusively as a backup, his best output consisting of 20 games in 2007–08. He scored the first of only three competitive goals during his tenure on 14 November 2007, in a 2–4 home loss to Villarreal in the Copa del Rey.

Suárez was loaned to Ponferradina of the same league for 2010–11, appearing in just one sixth of the matches and also suffering team relegation. In the 2013–14 season, he was not even given a jersey number and, in June 2014, left to sign with Inter Turku in the Finnish Veikkausliiga.

Suárez scored in his first-ever game in top flight football, helping Inter to a 2–1 home win over Turun Palloseura on 8 June 2014.

== Personal life ==
Suárez's twin brother, Sergio, was also a footballer and a midfielder, and both played mostly for Las Palmas during their careers.
