= Unión Estepona CF =

Unión Estepona
- Full name: Unión Estepona Club de Fútbol
- Nickname(s): Garrapatas (Ticks)
- Founded: 1995
- Dissolved: 2014
- Ground: Francisco Muñoz Pérez, Estepona, Andalusia, Spain
- Capacity: 4,500
- Chairman: (Spain) Eugenio Muñoz
- Manager: (Spain) Jaime Molina
- 2013–14: 3ª – Group 9, withdrew
Home colours	Away colours

Unión Estepona Club de Fútbol was a Spanish football team based in Estepona, in the autonomous community of Andalusia. Founded in 1995 and dissolved in 2014, it played its last season in Tercera División – Group 9, holding home matches at Estadio Francisco Muñoz Pérez, with a capacity of 4,500 spectators.

In 2014, the team was dissolved and replaced by CD Estepona FS.

== Season to season ==
Season	Tier	Division	Place	Copa del Rey
1995–96	6	1ª Reg.	2nd	
1996–97	5	Reg. Pref.	7th	
1997–98	5	Reg. Pref.	2nd	
1998–99	5	Reg. Pref.	10th	
1999–2000	5	Reg. Pref.	4th	
2001–02	5	Reg. Pref.	3rd	
2002–03	5	Reg. Pref.	9th	
2003–04	5	Reg. Pref.	4th	
2004–05	5	1ª And.	7th	

Season	Tier	Division	Place	Copa del Rey
2005–06	5	1ª And.	9th	
2006–07	5	1ª And.	3rd	
2007–08	5	1ª And.	2nd	
2008–09	4	3ª	1st	
2009–10	3	2ª B	9th	
2010–11	3	2ª B	18th	
2011–12	4	3ª	2nd	
2012–13	4	3ª	15th	
2013–14	4	3ª	(R)	

- 2 seasons in Segunda División B
- 4 seasons in Tercera División

== Former players ==
- (Philippines) Ángel Guirado
- (Spain) (Brazil) Catanha
- (England) Sam Coverdale
- (England) Jack Curd
