= CP Granada 74 =

Spanish football club

Granada 74
- Full name: Club Polideportivo Granada 74
- Founded: 1974
- Dissolved: 2010
- Ground: Granada 92; Granada, Andalusia, Spain
- Capacity: 5.000
- Chairman: (Spain) Carlos Marsá
Home colours	Away colours

Club Polideportivo Granada 74 was a Spanish football club based in Granada, in the autonomous community of Andalusia. Founded in 1974, it last played in Tercera División in 2009, holding home games at Ciudad Deportiva Granada 92, with a capacity of 16,200 spectators.

== History ==
Granada 74 was founded in 1974 in the neighborhood of La Chana. After 21 years, it first competed in the fourth division, in a spell that would last one full decade.

At the end of the 2006–07 season, CP Granada returned from the regional leagues in Andalusia. However, after the relocation of second level club Ciudad de Murcia to Granada, with that team being renamed Granada 74 CF, it was announced that CP Granada 74 would become the new club's reserve team. The relocated Granada team ceased to operate in 2009, leaving the original team to become the senior side once again, however this team also ceased operations soon after.

== Season to season ==
Season	Tier	Division	Place	Copa del Rey
1974–75	6	2ª Reg.	6th	
1975–76	6	2ª Reg.	7th	
1976–77	6	2ª Reg.	8th	
1977–78	7	2ª Reg.	4th	
1978–79	7	2ª Reg.	16th	
1979–80	7	2ª Reg.	17th	
1980–81	6	1ª Reg.	12th	
1981–82	5	Reg. Pref.	16th	
1982–83	6	1ª Reg.	3rd	
1983–84	5	Reg. Pref.	18th	
1984–85	6	1ª Reg.	1st	
1985–86	5	Reg. Pref.	18th	
1986–87	5	Reg. Pref.	9th	
1987–88	5	Reg. Pref.	5th	
1988–89	5	Reg. Pref.	11th	
1989–90	5	Reg. Pref.	4th	
1990–91	5	Reg. Pref.	4th	
1991–92	5	Reg. Pref.	3rd	

Season	Tier	Division	Place	Copa del Rey
1992–93	5	Reg. Pref.	3rd	
1993–94	5	Reg. Pref.	6th	
1994–95	5	Reg. Pref.	2nd	
1995–96	4	3ª	8th	
1996–97	4	3ª	10th	
1997–98	4	3ª	3rd	
1998–99	4	3ª	8th	
1999–2000	4	3ª	6th	
2000–01	4	3ª	4th	
2001–02	4	3ª	5th	
2002–03	4	3ª	1st	
2003–04	4	3ª	3rd	First round
2004–05	4	3ª	19th	
2005–06	5	1ª And.	4th	
2006–07	5	1ª And.	1st	
2007–08	4	3ª	11th	N/A (Note: Reserve team of Granada 74 CF.)
2008–09	4	3ª	18th	N/A

- 12 seasons in Tercera División
