= 2008–09 Tercera División =

Tercera División
- Season: 2008–09
- Promoted: Gimn. de Torrelavega; Unión Estepona; Villajoyosa; Varea; Espanyol B; Real Oviedo; Toledo; Palencia; Compostela; Izarra; San Roque; Alcalá; Cerro Reyes; Sporting Mahonés; Cacereño; Caravaca; Mallorca B; Mirandés

The 2008–09 Tercera División was the fourth tier of football in Spain. Play started on 30 August 2008 and ended on 28 June 2009 with the promotion play-off finals.

== Overview ==
There were 363 clubs competing in Tercera División (Third division) in the 2008–09 season, divided into 18 regional groups, each accommodating between 20 and 21 clubs.

The following clubs finished as champions of their respective groups

- Grupo I (Galicia) - Compostela
- Grupo II (Asturias) - Oviedo
- Grupo III (Cantabria) - Gimn. Torrelavega
- Grupo IV (País Vasco) - Lagun Onak
- Grupo V (Cataluña) - Espanyol B
- Grupo VI (Comunidad Valenciana) - Villajoyosa
- Grupo VII (Comunidad de Madrid) - Alcalá
- Grupo VIII (Castilla & León) - Palencia
- Grupo IX (Andalucía Oriental (Almería, Granada, Jaén & Málaga) & Melilla) - Unión Estepona
- Grupo X (Andalucía Occidental (Cádiz, Córdoba, Huelva & Sevilla) & Ceuta) - San Roque
- Grupo XI (Islas Baleares) - Mallorca B
- Grupo XII (Canarias) - Tenerife B
- Grupo XIII (Región de Murcia) - Caravaca
- Grupo XIV (Extremadura) - Cerro Reyes
- Grupo XV (Navarra) - Izarra
- Grupo XVI (La Rioja) - Varea
- Grupo XVII (Aragón) - Monzón
- Grupo XVIII (Castilla-La Mancha) - Toledo

The 18 group champion clubs participated in the Group winners promotion play-off and the losers from these 9 play-off ties then proceeded to the Non-champions promotion play-off with clubs finishing second, third and fourth.

== League standings ==
Key to colours in league table:
Promoted via playoffs
Participated in playoffs
Direct relegation

=== Group I - Galicia ===
Pos	Team	Pld	W	D	L	GF	GA	GD	Pts	Qualification or relegation
1	Compostela (P)	38	25	10	3	70	26	+44	85	Play-off
2	Montañeros (Note: Montañeros promoted to Segunda División B due to SD Ciudad de Santiago administrative relegation to Tercera División.) (P)	38	22	10	6	68	41	+27	76	Play-off
3	Ourense	38	22	5	11	74	40	+34	71	Play-off
4	Cerceda	38	19	7	12	66	47	+19	64	Play-off
5	Narón	38	16	10	12	67	55	+12	58	
6	Lalín	38	13	14	11	36	37	−1	53	
7	Coruxo	38	14	11	13	48	39	+9	53	
8	Alondras	38	12	14	12	48	45	+3	50	
9	Santa Comba	38	12	14	12	42	47	−5	50	
10	Negreira	38	12	10	16	42	52	−10	46	
11	Somozas	38	12	10	16	46	59	−13	46	
12	Céltiga	38	11	12	15	34	46	−12	45	
13	Órdenes	38	10	15	13	36	35	+1	45	
14	Verín	38	11	12	15	45	58	−13	45	
15	Rápido Bouzas	38	11	11	16	38	54	−16	44	
16	Villalonga	38	11	12	15	49	51	−2	45	
17	Pontevedra B	38	11	10	17	36	48	−12	43	
18	Portonovo (R)	38	8	15	15	36	51	−15	39	
19	Arosa (R)	38	8	11	19	61	83	−22	35	
20	Gran Peña (R)	38	8	10	20	29	55	−26	34	

(P) Promoted; (R) Relegated

=== Group II - Asturias ===
Pos	Team	Pld	W	D	L	GF	GA	GD	Pts	Qualification or relegation
1	Oviedo (P)	38	33	4	1	100	14	+86	103	Play-off
2	Univ. Oviedo	38	22	7	9	68	44	+24	73	Play-off
3	Candás	38	20	10	8	58	37	+21	70	Play-off
4	Llanes	38	20	9	9	59	41	+18	69	Play-off
5	Langreo	38	17	9	12	63	39	+24	60	
6	Tuilla	38	15	13	10	50	43	+7	58	
7	Caudal	38	14	11	13	45	35	+10	53	
8	Gijón Ind.	38	14	9	15	46	65	−19	51	
9	Cudillero	38	9	19	10	53	54	−1	46	
10	Lealtad	38	11	12	15	46	49	−3	45	
11	Real Avilés	38	9	16	13	45	44	+1	43	
12	Condal	38	11	10	17	43	65	−22	43	
13	Covadonga	38	12	7	19	43	62	−19	43	
14	Ribadesella	38	9	15	14	48	60	−12	42	
15	Ceares	38	10	12	16	45	57	−12	42	
16	Navarro	38	11	9	18	43	59	−16	42	
17	Astur	38	11	8	19	49	70	−21	41	
18	Nalón (R)	38	8	14	16	49	69	−20	38	
19	Siero (R)	38	9	9	20	38	62	−24	36	
20	Mosconia (R)	38	7	13	18	57	79	−22	34	

(P) Promoted; (R) Relegated

=== Group III - Cantabria ===
Pos	Team	Pld	W	D	L	GF	GA	GD	Pts	Qualification or relegation
1	Gimn. Torrelavega (P)	38	32	5	1	103	15	+88	101	Play-off
2	Noja	38	25	11	2	85	19	+66	86	Play-off
3	Tropezón	38	24	10	4	56	16	+40	82	Play-off
4	Escobedo	38	21	12	5	74	33	+41	75	Play-off
5	Bezana	38	18	12	8	56	34	+22	66	
6	Reocín	38	20	6	12	75	38	+37	66	
7	Siete Villas	38	14	12	12	51	55	−4	54	
8	Castro	38	15	8	15	46	41	+5	53	
9	Laredo	38	13	10	15	42	51	−9	49	
10	Atl. Albericia	38	13	10	15	36	48	−12	49	
11	Barreda	38	14	7	17	42	59	−17	49	
12	Atl. Deva	38	13	9	16	55	48	+7	48	
13	Ribamontán	38	13	7	18	51	56	−5	46	
14	Rayo Cantabria	38	12	5	21	38	64	−26	41	
15	Cayón	38	10	10	18	47	72	−25	40	
16	Solares	38	9	12	17	36	53	−17	39	
17	Vimenor	38	9	11	18	38	56	−18	38	
18	Santoña (R)	38	9	9	20	41	66	−25	36	
19	Cultural Guarnizo (R)	38	5	11	22	20	57	−37	26	
20	Velarde (R)	38	1	3	34	15	126	−111	6	

(P) Promoted; (R) Relegated

=== Group IV - Basque Country ===
Pos	Team	Pld	W	D	L	GF	GA	GD	Pts	Qualification or relegation
1	Lagun Onak	38	21	10	7	51	25	+26	73	Play-off
2	Amurrio	38	21	10	7	63	27	+36	73	Play-off
3	Elgoibar	38	19	13	6	54	32	+22	70	Play-off
4	Portugalete	38	20	10	8	54	35	+19	70	Play-off
5	Beasain	38	20	10	8	68	38	+30	70	
6	Gernika	38	15	11	12	45	35	+10	56	
7	Baskonia	38	14	14	10	50	51	−1	56	
8	Laudio	38	11	17	10	39	43	−4	50	
9	Zamudio	38	11	16	11	42	38	+4	49	
10	Amorebieta	38	13	9	16	59	59	0	48	
11	Leoia	38	12	11	15	38	45	−7	47	
12	Arenas de Getxo	38	11	14	13	38	43	−5	47	
13	Zalla	38	12	10	16	35	53	−18	46	
14	Santurtzi	38	12	10	16	36	45	−9	46	
15	Eibar B	38	9	17	12	32	35	−3	44	
16	Durango	38	11	10	17	44	50	−6	43	
17	Zarautz (R)	38	10	12	16	45	51	−6	42	
18	Ordizia (R)	38	10	10	18	35	61	−26	40	
19	Alavés B (R)	38	7	11	20	31	53	−22	32	
20	San Ignacio (R)	38	2	13	23	25	65	−40	19	

(R) Relegated

=== Group V - Catalonia ===
Pos	Team	Pld	W	D	L	GF	GA	GD	Pts	Qualification or relegation
1	Espanyol B (P)	38	24	11	3	84	26	+58	83	Play-off
2	Reus Deportiu	38	23	10	5	76	37	+39	79	Play-off
3	L'Hospitalet	38	21	13	4	63	28	+35	76	Play-off
4	Santboià	38	18	12	8	58	39	+19	66	Play-off
5	Manlleu	38	19	7	12	61	41	+20	64	
6	Premià	38	18	10	10	70	53	+17	64	
7	Vilanova	38	14	13	11	64	49	+15	55	
8	Prat	38	15	10	13	46	45	+1	55	
9	P. Mafumet	38	13	10	15	50	62	−12	49	
10	Amposta	38	13	10	15	62	66	−4	49	
11	Europa	38	13	9	16	52	55	−3	48	
12	Cornellà	38	12	12	14	47	59	−12	48	
13	Cassà	38	10	16	12	47	52	−5	46	
14	Rapitenca	38	11	10	17	44	55	−11	43	
15	Blanes	38	10	12	16	58	73	−15	42	
16	Balaguer	38	10	9	19	49	58	−9	39	
17	Palamós	38	9	11	18	45	69	−24	38	
18	Mataró (R)	38	8	12	18	44	68	−24	36	
19	Vilajuïga (Note: Team dissolved after the end of the season) (W)	38	7	10	21	42	80	−38	31	
20	Banyoles (R)	38	3	9	26	30	82	−52	18	

(P) Promoted; (R) Relegated; (W) Withdrew

=== Group VI - Valencian Community ===
Pos	Team	Pld	W	D	L	GF	GA	GD	Pts	Qualification or relegation
1	Villajoyosa (P)	38	21	11	6	58	31	+27	74	Play-off
2	Alicante B	38	20	11	7	62	33	+29	71	Play-off
3	La Nucía	38	20	11	7	45	27	+18	71	Play-off
4	Torrevieja	38	19	11	8	52	29	+23	68	Play-off
5	Gandía	38	15	19	4	41	30	+11	64	
6	Eldense	38	19	7	12	44	32	+12	64	
7	Burjassot	38	15	17	6	50	38	+12	62	
8	Catarroja	38	18	5	15	43	37	+6	59	
9	Villarreal C	38	16	8	14	66	52	+14	56	
10	Onda	38	14	11	13	43	42	+1	53	
11	Novelda	38	14	9	15	45	33	+12	51	
12	Levante B	38	11	14	13	34	38	−4	47	
13	Jove Español	38	11	11	16	50	46	+4	44	
14	Ribarroja	38	10	13	15	38	49	−11	43	
15	J.B. Cristo	38	10	11	17	42	59	−17	41	
16	Crevillente	38	9	12	17	40	51	−11	39	
17	Puçol	38	9	12	17	48	71	−23	39	
18	Castellón B (R)	38	10	8	20	50	66	−16	38	
19	Pego (R)	38	6	6	26	26	80	−54	24	
20	Utiel (R)	38	5	9	24	31	64	−33	24	

(P) Promoted; (R) Relegated

=== Group VII - Community of Madrid ===
Pos	Team	Pld	W	D	L	GF	GA	GD	Pts	Qualification or relegation
1	Alcalá (P)	40	27	7	6	65	22	+43	88	Play-off
2	Parla	40	22	11	7	63	34	+29	77	Play-off
3	Rayo Majadahonda	40	20	9	11	53	37	+16	69	Play-off
4	Alcobendas	40	19	11	10	59	43	+16	68	Play-off
5	Rayo B	40	17	14	9	52	34	+18	65	
6	Getafe B	40	18	8	14	62	46	+16	62	
7	Ciempozuelos	40	15	15	10	49	42	+7	60	
8	Real Madrid C	40	16	10	14	60	46	+14	58	
9	Vallecas	40	15	12	13	56	53	+3	57	
10	Fuenlabrada	40	15	11	14	50	48	+2	56	
11	Móstoles	40	15	11	14	48	41	+7	56	
12	Santa Ana	40	15	8	17	46	52	−6	53	
13	S.S. Reyes	40	12	17	11	35	34	+1	53	
14	Atlético C	40	13	14	13	52	49	+3	53	
15	Atl. Pinto	40	14	10	16	53	49	+4	52	
16	Galáctico Pegaso	40	13	13	14	48	45	+3	52	
17	Puerta Bonita (R)	40	12	15	13	35	40	−5	51	
18	Las Rozas (R)	40	12	10	18	58	62	−4	46	
19	Colonia Ofigevi (R)	40	6	12	22	35	59	−24	30	
20	Pozuelo Alarcón (R)	40	6	11	23	41	75	−34	29	
21	Collado Villalba (R)	40	1	5	34	31	139	−108	8	

(P) Promoted; (R) Relegated

=== Group VIII - Castilla and León ===
Pos	Team	Pld	W	D	L	GF	GA	GD	Pts	Qualification or relegation
1	Palencia (P)	38	28	6	4	83	22	+61	90	Play-off
2	Mirandés (P)	38	27	5	6	89	24	+65	86	Play-off
3	Burgos	38	23	12	3	71	18	+53	81	Play-off
4	Ávila	38	24	7	7	77	35	+42	79	Play-off
5	Arandina	38	23	8	7	70	41	+29	77	
6	Bembibre	38	18	7	13	59	38	+21	61	
7	Huracán Z	38	17	9	12	61	46	+15	60	
8	Gimn. Segoviana	38	16	10	12	49	49	0	55 (Note: 3 points deducted for not being present to play against CD Aguilar.)	
9	Aguilar	38	13	10	15	43	43	0	49	
10	Salmantino	38	12	10	16	48	50	−2	46	
11	Íscar	38	11	12	15	50	65	−15	45	
12	Santa Marta	38	11	12	15	43	61	−18	45	
13	Numancia B	38	11	9	18	38	50	−12	42	
14	La Granja	38	10	9	19	36	50	−14	39	
15	Atl. Astorga	38	10	9	19	41	63	−22	39	
16	Almazán	38	9	11	18	34	61	−27	38	
17	Leonesa B	38	9	6	23	35	80	−45	33	
18	Becerril (R)	38	7	10	21	28	62	−34	31	
19	Norma (R)	38	6	10	22	35	70	−35	28	
20	Cebrereña (R)	38	7	4	27	38	100	−62	25	

(P) Promoted; (R) Relegated

=== Group IX - Eastern Andalusia and Melilla ===
Pos	Team	Pld	W	D	L	GF	GA	GD	Pts	Qualification or relegation
1	Unión Estepona (P)	38	27	6	5	87	36	+51	87	Qualification to group champions' playoffs
2	Almería B	38	25	7	6	86	36	+50	82	Qualification to promotion playoffs
3	Motril	38	22	12	4	73	38	+35	78	Qualification to promotion playoffs
4	Málaga B	38	19	11	8	66	31	+35	68	Qualification to promotion playoffs
5	Baza	38	18	11	9	57	33	+24	65	
6	Comarca Níjar	38	18	6	14	51	41	+10	60	
7	Poli Ejido B	38	16	9	13	58	47	+11	57	
8	Vélez	38	15	11	12	57	50	+7	56	
9	Loja	38	14	8	16	29	40	−11	50	
10	Granada Atlético (Note: Team dissolved after the end of the season.) (D)	38	14	7	17	44	52	−8	49	Relegation to Primera División Andaluza
11	Ciudad Vícar	38	13	9	16	58	60	−2	48	
12	Ronda	38	13	9	16	51	55	−4	48	
13	Alhaurino	38	12	10	16	57	59	−2	46	
14	Santa Fe	38	12	7	19	51	67	−16	43	
15	Adra	38	11	9	18	40	65	−25	42	
16	Arenas de Armilla	38	10	14	14	41	44	−3	41 (Note: 3 points deducted for not being present to play against Casino del Real in Melilla.)	
17	Vera	38	12	5	21	35	61	−26	41	
18	Granada 74 (Note: Due to the relegation of Granada 74 CF from Segunda División B to this group, the reserve team, CP Granada 74, was relegated to Preferente.) (D)	38	8	12	18	48	66	−18	36	Relegation to Primera División Andaluza
19	Imperio Albolote (R)	38	8	4	26	28	77	−49	28	Relegation to Primera División Andaluza
20	Casino del Real (R)	38	7	5	26	27	86	−59	26	Relegation to Primera División Andaluza
21	Mengíbar (Note: Team withdrawn from the competition and consequently dissolved) (W)	0	0	0	0	0	0	0	0	Relegation to Primera División Andaluza

(D) Dissolved; (P) Promoted; (R) Relegated; (W) Withdrew

=== Group X - Western Andalusia and Ceuta ===
Pos	Team	Pld	W	D	L	GF	GA	GD	Pts	Qualification or relegation
1	San Roque (P)	37	22	8	7	64	38	+26	74	Play-off
2	Jerez Industrial (Note: Jerez Industrial promoted to Segunda División B due to CD Linares dissolution.) (P)	37	23	4	10	61	37	+24	73	Play-off
3	Los Barrios	37	20	7	10	57	39	+18	67	Play-off
4	Alcalá	37	18	12	7	47	30	+17	66	Play-off
5	Sevilla C	37	19	8	10	68	48	+20	65	
6	Coria	37	20	4	13	56	51	+5	64	
7	Puerto Real	37	18	8	11	56	35	+21	62	
8	Mairena	37	14	12	11	49	40	+9	54	
9	Ayamonte	37	14	9	14	51	54	−3	51	
10	Pozoblanco	37	11	13	13	47	46	+1	46	
11	Recreativo B	37	11	12	14	41	39	+2	45	
12	Cartaya	37	11	11	15	44	55	−11	44	
13	Cádiz B	37	11	11	15	38	49	−11	44	
14	Los Palacios	37	11	10	16	48	61	−13	43	
15	Dos Hermanas	37	9	16	12	32	46	−14	43	
16	Sanluqueño	37	9	11	17	29	48	−19	38	
17	Córdoba B	37	7	9	21	45	69	−24	30	
18	Chiclana (R)	37	6	10	21	47	69	−22	28	
19	Antoniano (R)	37	5	10	22	29	61	−32	25	
20	Villanueva (Note: Team withdrawn from the competition and consequently relegated) (R)	0	0	0	0	0	0	0	0	

(P) Promoted; (R) Relegated

=== Group XI - Balearic Islands ===
Pos	Team	Pld	W	D	L	GF	GA	GD	Pts	Qualification or relegation
1	Mallorca B (P)	38	25	12	1	91	30	+61	87	Play-off
2	Sporting Mahonés (P)	38	20	15	3	72	27	+45	75	Play-off
3	Santanyí	38	20	13	5	69	24	+45	73	Play-off
4	Binissalem	38	21	8	9	74	37	+37	71	Play-off
5	Soledad (Note: Soledad resigned from Tercera División at the end of the season and thus relegated to Preferente, so Arenal was re-admitted to Tercera División.) (R)	38	21	3	14	71	67	+4	66	
6	Ferriolense	38	19	8	11	81	49	+32	65	
7	Poblense	38	15	13	10	50	38	+12	58	
8	Montuïri	38	16	9	13	52	47	+5	57	
9	Alcúdia	38	14	14	10	50	42	+8	56	
10	Constancia	38	14	14	10	55	42	+13	56	
11	Campos	38	12	11	15	50	55	−5	47	
12	Eivissa-Ibiza B (Note: Due to relegation to SE Eivissa-Ibiza from Segunda División B to this group, the reserve team, SE Eivissa-Ibiza B, was forced to relegate to Preferente.)	38	10	16	12	56	65	−9	46	
13	Alaior	38	12	8	18	41	68	−27	44	
14	Atlètic Ciutadella	38	10	11	17	48	65	−17	41	
15	Cala d'Or (Note: Cala d'Or resigned from Tercera División at the end of the season and thus relegated to Preferente, so Mercadal was re-admitted to Tercera División.)	38	10	9	19	32	48	−16	39	
16	Mercadal	38	9	10	19	47	73	−26	37	
17	Arenal	38	7	13	18	30	58	−28	34	
18	Manacor (R)	38	6	10	22	32	76	−44	28	
19	Artà (R)	38	7	6	25	47	106	−59	27	
20	Andratx (R)	38	5	11	22	47	78	−31	26	

(P) Promoted; (R) Relegated

=== Group XII - Canary Islands ===
Pos	Team	Pld	W	D	L	GF	GA	GD	Pts	Qualification or relegation
1	Tenerife B (Note: Tenerife B promoted to Segunda División B due to UD Fuerteventura administrative relegation to Tercera División.) (P)	38	24	9	5	75	27	+48	81	Play-off
2	Tenisca	38	23	11	4	65	27	+38	80	Play-off
3	Castillo	38	20	9	9	60	32	+28	69	Play-off
4	Mensajero	38	20	6	12	48	33	+15	66	Play-off
5	Laguna	38	16	11	11	52	33	+19	59	
6	Los Llanos	38	14	14	10	57	43	+14	56	
7	Gáldar	38	14	12	12	40	40	0	54	
8	Granadilla	38	16	6	16	51	43	+8	54	
9	Marino	38	15	8	15	45	51	−6	53	
10	Realejos	38	14	10	14	42	45	−3	52	
11	Or. Marítima	38	13	11	14	51	52	−1	50	
12	Victoria	38	13	10	15	48	54	−6	49	
13	Universidad B	38	13	7	18	40	52	−12	46	
14	Tijarafe	38	11	13	14	44	49	−5	46	
15	Las Zocas	38	12	9	17	40	54	−14	45	
16	V.S. Brígida B (Note: Team dissolved after the end of the season.)	38	8	18	12	42	52	−10	42	
17	Huracán	38	12	4	22	42	64	−22	40	
18	Tegueste (R)	38	10	9	19	44	55	−11	39	
19	Arguineguín (R)	38	9	8	21	41	67	−26	35	
20	Teguise (R)	38	6	9	23	31	84	−53	27	

(P) Promoted; (R) Relegated

=== Group XIII - Region of Murcia ===
Pos	Team	Pld	W	D	L	GF	GA	GD	Pts	Qualification or relegation
1	Caravaca (P)	38	27	6	5	115	26	+89	87	Play-off
2	Moratalla (Note: Moratalla promoted to Segunda División B due to Lorca Deportiva CF administrative relegation to Tercera División.) (P)	38	25	8	5	82	32	+50	83	Play-off
3	La Unión	38	23	11	4	76	27	+49	80	Play-off
4	Yeclano	38	24	8	6	83	37	+46	80	Play-off
5	Pinatar	38	21	9	8	77	37	+40	72	
6	Mazarrón	38	19	10	9	81	46	+35	67	
7	Cieza	38	16	14	8	77	45	+32	62	
8	Jumilla	38	16	14	8	63	35	+28	62	
9	Beniel	38	15	11	12	39	32	+7	56	
10	Santomera	38	13	10	15	51	66	−15	49	
11	Pulpileño	38	13	7	18	50	67	−17	46	
12	Murcia Deportivo	38	12	9	17	59	56	+3	45	
13	Lorca Deportiva B (Note: Due to relegation to Lorca Deportiva CF from Segunda División B to this group, the reserve team, Lorca Deportiva CF B, was forced to relegate to Preferente.)	38	9	15	14	49	54	−5	42	
14	Bala Azul	38	12	4	22	52	86	−34	40	
15	Plus Ultra	38	10	10	18	43	64	−21	40	
16	Calasparra	38	9	13	16	43	60	−17	40	
17	Lumbreras	38	8	6	24	41	90	−49	30	
18	Pozo Estrecho (R)	38	8	6	24	40	88	−48	30	
19	Muleño (R)	38	4	11	23	33	85	−52	23	
20	Ciudad Lorca (R)	38	4	2	32	32	153	−121	12 (Note: 2 points deducted for not paying three times the referee rights.)	

(P) Promoted; (R) Relegated

=== Group XIV - Extremadura ===
Pos	Team	Pld	W	D	L	GF	GA	GD	Pts	Qualification or relegation
1	Cerro Reyes (P)	38	28	8	2	88	27	+61	92	Play-off
2	Cacereño (P)	38	28	7	3	90	26	+64	91	Play-off
3	Villanovense (Note: Villanovense promoted to Segunda División B due to Mérida UD administrative relegation to Tercera División.) (P)	38	22	8	8	64	26	+38	74	Play-off
4	Don Benito	38	17	14	7	47	29	+18	65	Play-off
5	Badajoz	38	15	14	9	54	38	+16	59	
6	Jerez	38	14	12	12	42	35	+7	54	
7	Moralo	38	14	9	15	44	48	−4	51	
8	Valdelacalzada	38	14	8	16	38	52	−14	50	
9	Olivenza	38	13	10	15	42	45	−3	49	
10	Imperio	38	12	12	14	41	48	−7	48	
11	La Estrella	38	12	11	15	46	46	0	47	
12	Sp. Villanueva	38	13	7	18	37	55	−18	46	
13	UD Badajoz	38	11	12	15	41	49	−8	45	
14	Sanvicenteño	38	13	4	21	39	68	−29	43	
15	Miajadas	38	10	12	16	38	53	−15	42	
16	Santa Marta	38	12	6	20	43	63	−20	42	
17	Ciudad Plasencia	38	10	11	17	34	53	−19	41	
18	Díter Zafra (R)	38	9	12	17	40	57	−17	39	
19	Plasencia (R)	38	8	11	19	50	66	−16	35	
20	Valdivia (R)	38	6	10	22	30	64	−34	28	

(P) Promoted; (R) Relegated

=== Group XV - Navarra ===
Pos	Team	Pld	W	D	L	GF	GA	GD	Pts	Qualification or relegation
1	Izarra (P)	40	28	8	4	87	29	+58	92	Play-off
2	Peña Sport	40	27	8	5	82	33	+49	89	Play-off
3	Tudelano	40	20	13	7	68	35	+33	73	Play-off
4	Mutilvera	40	21	10	9	72	40	+32	73	Play-off
5	San Juan	40	20	10	10	65	41	+24	70	
6	Iruña	40	19	10	11	62	44	+18	67	
7	Cirbonero	40	16	12	12	50	45	+5	60	
8	Valle de Egüés	40	17	9	14	58	52	+6	60	
9	Huarte	40	13	14	13	52	44	+8	53	
10	Lourdes	40	14	10	16	46	56	−10	52	
11	Aoiz	40	12	12	16	48	54	−6	48	
12	Chantrea	40	11	14	15	46	52	−6	47	
13	Oberena	40	14	5	21	51	63	−12	47	
14	River Ega	40	13	8	19	44	62	−18	47	
15	Aluvión	40	13	8	19	53	80	−27	47	
16	Peña Azagresa	40	13	5	22	50	75	−25	44	
17	Murchante	40	10	13	17	38	59	−21	43	
18	Idoya (R)	40	12	7	21	41	59	−18	43	
19	Ardoi (R)	40	8	17	15	48	59	−11	41	
20	Lagunak (R)	40	11	4	25	39	71	−32	37	
21	Mendi (R)	40	4	11	25	32	78	−46	23	

(P) Promoted; (R) Relegated

=== Group XVI - La Rioja ===
Pos	Team	Pld	W	D	L	GF	GA	GD	Pts	Qualification or relegation
1	Varea (P)	37	30	6	1	104	23	+81	96	Play-off
2	Haro	37	25	9	3	87	22	+65	84	Play-off
3	Anguiano	37	25	8	4	108	42	+66	83	Play-off
4	Calahorra	37	25	5	7	81	34	+47	80	Play-off
5	River Ebro	37	22	7	8	67	34	+33	73	
6	Náxara	37	20	12	5	63	26	+37	72	
7	Oyonesa	37	22	5	10	72	30	+42	71	
8	San Marcial	37	18	9	10	60	47	+13	63	
9	Agoncillo	37	12	10	15	46	65	−19	46	
10	Calasancio	37	11	7	19	52	64	−12	40	
11	Berceo	37	10	9	18	38	60	−22	39	
12	AF Calahorra	37	9	11	17	29	48	−19	38	
13	Villegas	37	9	11	17	44	75	−31	38	
14	Arnedo	37	9	8	20	44	80	−36	35	
15	Yagüe	37	9	7	21	40	63	−23	34	
16	Alberite	37	8	6	23	37	70	−33	30	
17	Cenicero	37	4	8	25	39	92	−53	20	
18	Tedeón (R)	37	4	5	28	28	100	−72	17	
19	Fundación Logroñés (R)	37	3	7	27	22	99	−77	16	
20	Logroñés (Note: Team withdrawn from the competition and consequently relegated) (R)	0	0	0	0	0	0	0	0	

(P) Promoted; (R) Relegated

=== Group XVII - Aragón ===
Pos	Team	Pld	W	D	L	GF	GA	GD	Pts	Qualification or relegation
1	Monzón	38	27	7	4	87	28	+59	88	Play-off
2	Real Zaragoza B	38	26	8	4	91	30	+61	86	Play-off
3	Teruel	38	25	7	6	78	22	+56	82	Play-off
4	La Muela	38	24	8	6	86	32	+54	80	Play-off
5	Ejea	38	22	5	11	74	38	+36	71	
6	Andorra	38	20	7	11	76	44	+32	67	
7	Utebo	38	16	9	13	61	58	+3	57	
8	Sariñena	38	16	9	13	51	58	−7	57	
9	Barbastro	38	14	8	16	51	58	−7	50	
10	Calatayud	38	12	11	15	52	56	−4	47	
11	Alcañiz	38	12	10	16	64	68	−4	46	
12	Villanueva	38	12	9	17	62	65	−3	45	
13	Sabiñánigo	38	11	10	17	35	60	−25	43	
14	Cuarte Industrial	38	11	9	18	45	59	−14	42	
15	Giner Torrero	38	11	8	19	40	67	−27	41	
16	Fraga	38	11	7	20	48	71	−23	40	
17	San Lorenzo (R)	38	11	5	22	36	76	−40	38	
18	Binéfar (R)	38	9	11	18	50	82	−32	38	
19	Zuera (R)	38	5	6	27	33	76	−43	21	
20	Brea (R)	38	5	6	27	35	107	−72	21	

(R) Relegated

=== Group XVIII - Castilla-La Mancha ===
Pos	Team	Pld	W	D	L	GF	GA	GD	Pts	Qualification or relegation
1	Toledo (P)	36	23	9	4	65	24	+41	78	Play-off
2	Almansa	36	20	9	7	55	33	+22	69	Play-off
3	Manchego (Note: Manchego CF was relegated to Preferente for not paying its players.) (R)	36	18	11	7	63	40	+23	65	Play-off
4	Hellín	36	16	11	9	51	38	+13	59	Play-off
5	Socuéllamos	36	18	4	14	42	36	+6	58	
6	Illescas	36	14	10	12	44	35	+9	52	
7	Tomelloso	36	14	10	12	43	34	+9	52	
8	Alcázar	36	13	12	11	44	44	0	51	
9	Daimiel	36	12	14	10	43	38	+5	50	
10	Piedrabuena	36	14	7	15	40	42	−2	49	
11	Marchamalo	36	12	11	13	35	51	−16	47	
12	U. Criptanense	36	12	9	15	35	37	−2	45	
13	Talavera	36	12	9	15	47	42	+5	45	
14	La Roda	36	10	13	13	36	40	−4	43	
15	Albacete B	36	10	11	15	34	37	−3	41	
16	Azuqueca	36	9	13	14	43	58	−15	40	
17	Villarrobledo	36	9	13	14	37	46	−9	40	
18	Torpedo 66 (R)	36	7	7	22	26	61	−35	28	
19	Atl. Tarazona (R)	36	4	7	25	30	77	−47	19	
20	Atl. Esquivias (Note: Team withdrawn from the competition and consequently dissolved) (W)	0	0	0	0	0	0	0	0	

(P) Promoted; (R) Relegated; (W) Withdrew

== Promotion play-offs ==
=== Group winners promotion play-off ===
Promoted to Segunda División B: Gimn. de Torrelavega, Unión Estepona, Villajoyosa, Varea, Espanyol B, Real Oviedo, Toledo, Palencia and Compostela.

=== Non-champions promotion play-off ===
Promoted to Segunda División B: Izarra, San Roque, Alcalá, Cerro Reyes, Sporting Mahonés, Cacereño, Caravaca, Mallorca B and Mirandés.
