= AD Cerro de Reyes =

Spanish football club

Cerro Reyes
- Full name: Agrupación Deportiva; Cerro de Reyes Badajoz Atlético
- Founded: 1980
- Dissolved: 2011
- Ground: José Pache, Badajoz, Extremadura, Spain
- Capacity: 3,500
- 2010–11: Segunda División B – Group 1, 20th of 20 (excluded)
Home colours	Away colours

Agrupación Deportiva Cerro de Reyes Badajoz Atlético was a Spanish football team based in Badajoz, in the autonomous community of Extremadura. Founded in 1980, it was dissolved in 2011. Its home matches were held at Estadio José Pache.

== History ==
In July 2006 Cerro de Reyes' president saved CD Badajoz from folding, by assisting in the latter's debts. Subsequently, Cerro took the other club's place in the third division, with Badajoz falling to the fourth.

In 2008–09 the team won Group 14 in the fourth level. In the play-offs it eventually promoted to division three for the first time in its history, after beating UD Los Barrios 2–0 on aggregate.

In its first season in the third division, Cerro de Reyes maintained its status after finishing in 14th position – Enzo Noir was the side's top scorer with 15 goals. However, in the following campaign, as the club was immersed in a severe economic crisis, many players left it in the winter transfer window, leading to the team's non-appearance for two matches in a row, which eventually led to its exclusion from the league and consequent relegation.

== Season to season ==
Season	Tier	Division	Place	Copa del Rey
1983–84	6	1ª Reg.	4th	
1984–85	6	1ª Reg.	2nd	
1985–86	5	Reg. Pref.	14th	
1986–87	5	Reg. Pref.	17th	
1987–88	5	Reg. Pref.	20th	
1988–89	6	1ª Reg.	1st	
1989–90	5	Reg. Pref.	13th	
1990–91	5	Reg. Pref.	19th	
1991–92	6	1ª Reg.	10th	
1992–93	6	1ª Reg.	6th	
1993–94	6	1ª Reg.	5th	
1994–95	6	1ª Reg.	5th	
1995–96	6	1ª Reg.	1st	
1996–97	5	Reg. Pref.	7th	

Season	Tier	Division	Place	Copa del Rey
1997–98	5	Reg. Pref.	7th	
1998–99	5	Reg. Pref.	1st	
1999–2000	4	3ª	14th	
2000–01	4	3ª	9th	
2001–02	4	3ª	8th	
2002–03	4	3ª	1st	
2003–04	4	3ª	3rd	Round of 32
2004–05	4	3ª	3rd	
2005–06	4	3ª	2nd	
2006–07	3	2ª B	17th	
2007–08	4	3ª	2nd	
2008–09	4	3ª	1st	
2009–10	3	2ª B	14th	Second round
2010–11	3	2ª B	(R)	

- 3 seasons in Segunda División B
- 9 seasons in Tercera División

== Current squad ==
As of November 2009. Note: Flags indicate national team as defined under FIFA eligibility rules; some limited exceptions apply. Players may hold more than one non-FIFA nationality.

No.	Pos.	Nation	Player
—	GK	ESP	Arturo González
—	DF	ARG	José Belforti
—	DF	ESP	Manu Cruz
—	DF	ESP	Gabi Frías
—	DF	ESP	Jona Monago
—	DF	ESP	Manuel Parra
—	DF	POR	Portela
—	DF	POR	Rodolfo
—	MF	ESP	Luis Arévalo
—	MF	ARG	Martín Belforti

No.	Pos.	Nation	Player
—	MF	ESP	José Cayado
—	MF	ESP	Cristo
—	MF	ESP	Iván Fernández
—	MF	ESP	Nauzet Fernández
—	MF	ESP	Golo
—	MF	ESP	Juanito
—	MF	ESP	Tino
—	FW	ARG	Enzo Noir
—	FW	ARG	Fernando Pierucci

== Stadium ==
Cerro de Reyes held home matches at Estadio José Pache, which has a capacity of 3,500 spectators. Located on the Avd. Jaime Montero de Espinosa street, S/N.
