= Castillo CF =

Spanish football club

Castillo
- Full name: Castillo Club de Fútbol
- Founded: 1950
- Ground: Estadio Municipal, San Bartolomé, Canary Islands, Spain
- Capacity: 1,000
- Chairman: (Spain) Juan Caraballo
- Manager: (Spain) Blas Quintana
- League: Primera Aficionados Gran Canaria – Group 2
- 2025–26: Primera Aficionados Gran Canaria – Group 2, 13th of 17
Home colours	Away colours

Castillo Club de Fútbol is a Spanish football team based in Castillo del Romeral, San Bartolomé de Tirajana, Gran Canaria, in the autonomous community of Canary Islands. Founded in 1950, it plays in Primera Aficionados Gran Canaria – Group 2, holding home games at Estadio Municipal de Castillo del Romeral, with a capacity of 1,000.

== History ==
In 1999, after playing nearly 50 years in the regional leagues, Castillo reached the fourth division. There, it achieved four consecutive top-five finishes, qualifying three times for the playoffs, albeit without promotion, before finally making it to the third level in 2004, remaining in the category for two seasons.

In July 2010, Castillo was forced to drop down to Preferente, due to serious financial problems.

== Season to season ==
Season	Tier	Division	Place	Copa del Rey
1968–69	6	3ª Reg.	4th	
1969–70	6	3ª Reg.	3rd	
1970–71	6	3ª Reg.	3rd	
1971–72	6	3ª Reg.	1st	
1972–73	6	3ª Reg.	7th	
1973–74	6	3ª Reg.	7th	
1974–75	6	3ª Reg.	2nd	
1975–76	6	3ª Reg.	5th	
1976–77	6	3ª Reg.	2nd	
1977–78	7	2ª Reg.	12th	
1978–79	7	2ª Reg.	7th	
1979–80	7	2ª Reg.	11th	
1980–81	7	2ª Reg.	10th	
1981–82	7	2ª Reg.	10th	
1982–83	7	2ª Reg.	9th	
1983–84	7	2ª Reg.	11th	
1984–85	7	2ª Reg.	9th	
1985–86	7	2ª Reg.	4th	
1986–87	7	2ª Reg.	1st	
1987–88	6	1ª Reg.	5th	

Season	Tier	Division	Place	Copa del Rey
1988–89	6	1ª Reg.	5th	
1989–90	6	1ª Reg.	8th	
1990–91	6	1ª Reg.	3rd	
1991–92	6	1ª Reg.	8th	
1992–93	6	1ª Reg.	4th	
1993–94	6	1ª Reg.	11th	
1994–95	6	1ª Reg.	1st	
1995–96	5	Int. Pref.	17th	
1996–97	6	1ª Reg.	3rd	
1997–98	5	Int. Pref.	14th	
1998–99	5	Int. Pref.	2nd	
1999–2000	4	3ª	4th	
2000–01	4	3ª	5th	
2001–02	4	3ª	2nd	
2002–03	4	3ª	2nd	
2003–04	4	3ª	1st	
2004–05	3	2ª B	10th	First round
2005–06	3	2ª B	16th	
2006–07	4	3ª	5th	
2007–08	4	3ª	4th	

Season	Tier	Division	Place	Copa del Rey
2008–09	4	3ª	3rd	
2009–10	4	3ª	12th	
2010–11	5	Int. Pref.	19th	
2011–12	6	1ª Reg.	8th	
2012–13	6	1ª Reg.	5th	
2013–14	6	1ª Afic.	8th	
2014–15	DNP			
2015–16	7	2ª Afic.	2nd	
2016–17	6	1ª Afic.	15th	
2017–18	6	1ª Afic.	6th	
2018–19	6	1ª Afic.	5th	
2019–20	6	1ª Afic.	5th	
2020–21	5	Int. Pref.	13th	
2021–22	7	1ª Afic.	8th	
2022–23	7	1ª Afic.	6th	
2023–24	7	1ª Afic.	2nd	
2024–25	7	1ª Afic.	8th	
2025–26	7	1ª Afic.	13th	
2026–27	7	1ª Afic.		

- 2 seasons in Segunda División B
- 9 seasons in Tercera División

== Notable players ==
- (Argentina) Pablo Paz
- (Spain) Víctor Afonso
- (Spain) Axier Intxaurraga
- (Spain) Andoni Lakabeg
- (Spain) Santi Lampón
- (Spain) Javi Ortega
- (Spain) Antonio Robaina
- (Spain) Francis Suárez
- (Spain) Sergio Suárez
- (Sweden) Daniel Visconti
- (Venezuela) Luis Miguel Reyes
