= 1995 Tercera División play-offs =

Spanish football league play-offs

The 1995 Tercera División play-offs to Segunda División B from Tercera División (Promotion play-offs) were the final playoffs for the promotion from 1994–95 Tercera División to 1995–96 Segunda División B. The first four teams in each group (excluding reserve teams) took part in the play-off.

== Format ==
The 68 participating teams were divided into 5 series each made up of 4 groups in the category, with the exception of Series E , which was only formed by Group XII . Each series was divided into 4 groups formed by a 1st, a 2nd, a 3rd and a 4th classified from each group, which played a double-round playoff. Each victory was equivalent to 2 points, the tie to 1 point and the defeat to 0 points. The champion of each group obtained the promotion to Second Division B.

The distribution of each series was as follows:

Series A:

- Group I – Galicia (Galicia (Spain))
- Group II – Asturias
- Group VII – Community of Madrid
- Group VIII – Castile and León

Series B:

- Group III – Cantabria
- Group IV – Basque Country (Basque Country (autonomous community))
- Group XV – La Rioja and Navarre
- Group XVI – Aragon

Series C:

- Group V – Catalonia
- Group VI – Valencian Community
- Group XI – Balearic Islands
- Gruoup XIII – Region of Murcia

Series D:

- Group IX – Eastern Andalusia and Melilla
- Group X – Western Andalusia and Ceuta
- Group XIV – Extremadura
- Group XVII – Castilla–La Mancha

Series E:

- Group XII – Canary Islands

== Teams for 1994–95 play-offs ==
| Group I – Galicia (Galicia (Spain)) | Group II – Asturias | Group III – Cantabria | Group IV – Basque Country (Basque Country (autonomous community)) | Group V – Catalonia |
|---|---|---|---|---|
| 1st CD Endesa As Pontes | 1st Caudal Deportivo | 1st Racing de Santander B | 1st CD Aurrerá de Vitoria | 1st RCD Español B |
| 2nd Viveiro CF | 2nd Club Siero | 2nd CD Bezana | 2nd SCD Durango | 2nd UE Tàrrega |
| 3rd Celta Turista CF | 3rd CD Lealtad | 3rd UM Escobedo | 3rd CD Hernani | 3rd FC Barcelona C |
| 4th RC Deportivo La Coruña B | 4th Real Titánico | 4th CD Tropezón | 4th Zalla UC | 4th Vilobí CF |

| Group VI – Valencian Community | Group VII – Community of Madrid | Group VIII – Castile and León | Group IX – E. Andalusia and Melilla | Group X – W. Andalusia and Ceuta |
|---|---|---|---|---|
| 1st CF Gandía | 1st DAV Santa Ana | 1st Cultural y Deportiva Leonesa | 1st Málaga CF | 1st CD Pozoblanco |
| 2nd CD Onda | 2nd CF Rayo Majadahonda | 2nd CD Salmantino | 2nd UD San Pedro | 2nd CD Utrera |
| 3rd Novelda CF | 3rd CD Carabanchel | 3rd CA Bembibre | 3rd CP Ejido | 3rd Chiclana CF |
| 4th Pinoso CF | 4th CD Leganés B | 4th Zamora CF | 4th Vélez CF | 4th Isla Cristina CD |

| Group XI – Balearic Islands | Group XII – Canary Islands | Group XIII – Region of Murcia | Group XIV – Extremadura | Group XV – Navarre and La Rioja |
|---|---|---|---|---|
| 1st RCD Mallorca B | 1st Estrella CF | 1st Lorca CF | 1st CD Don Benito | 1st CD Calahorra |
| 2nd CD Atlético Baleares | 2nd UD Salud Tenerife | 2nd Águilas CF | 2nd Jerez CF | 2nd Peña Sport FC |
| 3rd CF Sóller | 3rd UD Orotava | 3rd FC Jumilla | 3rd CD Badajoz B | 3rd UCD Burladés |
| 4th UD Poblense | 4th UD Gáldar | 4th Muleño CF | 4th CD Grabasa Burguillos | 4th SD Lagunak |

| Group XVI – Aragon | Group XVII – Castilla–La Mancha |
|---|---|
| 1st Club Endesa Andorra | 1st Hellín Deportivo |
| 2nd SD Huesca | 2nd Tomelloso CF |
| 3rd Utebo FC | 3rd Puertollano Industrial CF |
| 4th UD Barbastro | 4th CD Torrijos |

== Tables and Results ==
=== Group A-1 ===
| Pos | Team | Pld | W | D | L | GF | GA | GD | Pts | Qualification or relegation |
|---|---|---|---|---|---|---|---|---|---|---|
| 1 | (Galicia (Spain)) RC Deportivo La Coruña B (substituted on) | 6 | 4 | 2 | 0 | 12 | 4 | +8 | 10 | Promoted to Segunda División B |
| 2 | (Community of Madrid) CF Rayo Majadahonda | 6 | 2 | 1 | 3 | 10 | 9 | +1 | 5 | |
| 3 | (Asturias) Caudal Deportivo | 6 | 0 | 5 | 1 | 5 | 10 | −5 | 5 | |
| 4 | (Castile and León) CA Bembibre | 6 | 1 | 2 | 3 | 3 | 7 | −4 | 4 | |

Source: Fútbol Regional

| Home \ Away | BEM | CAU | DEP | RMJ |
|---|---|---|---|---|
| CA Bembibre | — | 1–1 | 0–2 | 1–0 |
| Caudal Deportivo | 0–0 | — | 1–1 | 0–0 |
| RC Deportivo La Coruña B | 1–0 | 2–2 | — | 4–0 |
| CF Rayo Majadahonda | 3–1 | 6–1 | 1–2 | — |

Updated to match(es) played on completed. Source: FutbolMe
Legend: Blue = home team win; Yellow = draw; Red = away team win.

=== Group A-2 ===
| Pos | Team | Pld | W | D | L | GF | GA | GD | Pts | Qualification or relegation |
|---|---|---|---|---|---|---|---|---|---|---|
| 1 | (Galicia (Spain)) CD Endesa As Pontes (substituted on) | 6 | 4 | 1 | 1 | 12 | 4 | +8 | 9 | Promoted to Segunda División B |
| 2 | (Community of Madrid) CD Leganés B | 6 | 3 | 2 | 1 | 15 | 6 | +9 | 8 | |
| 3 | (Asturias) CD Lealtad | 6 | 2 | 1 | 3 | 8 | 13 | −5 | 5 | |
| 4 | (Castile and León) CD Salmantino | 6 | 0 | 2 | 4 | 4 | 16 | −12 | 2 | |

Source: Fútbol Regional

| Home \ Away | EAP | LEA | LEG | SAL |
|---|---|---|---|---|
| CD Endesa As Pontes | — | 3–0 | 0–1 | 2–0 |
| CD Lealtad | 1–3 | — | 3–0 | 1–0 |
| CD Leganés B | 1–1 | 5–1 | — | 8–1 |
| CD Salmantino | 1–3 | 2–2 | 0–0 | — |

Updated to match(es) played on completed. Source: FutbolMe
Legend: Blue = home team win; Yellow = draw; Red = away team win.

=== Group A-3 ===
| Pos | Team | Pld | W | D | L | GF | GA | GD | Pts | Qualification or relegation |
|---|---|---|---|---|---|---|---|---|---|---|
| 1 | (Castile and León) Cultural y Deportiva Leonesa (substituted on) | 6 | 6 | 0 | 0 | 17 | 3 | +14 | 12 | Promoted to Segunda División B |
| 2 | (Community of Madrid) CD Carabanchel | 6 | 3 | 0 | 3 | 10 | 7 | +3 | 6 | |
| 3 | (Galicia (Spain)) Viveiro CF | 6 | 2 | 0 | 4 | 3 | 12 | −9 | 4 | |
| 4 | (Asturias) Real Titánico | 6 | 1 | 0 | 5 | 3 | 11 | −8 | 2 | |

Source: Fútbol Regional

| Home \ Away | CAR | CUL | TIT | VIV |
|---|---|---|---|---|
| CD Carabanchel | — | 1–3 | 1–0 | 4–1 |
| CyD Leonesa | 2–1 | — | 3–1 | 3–0 |
| Real Titánico | 0–3 | 0–3 | — | 2–1 |
| Viveiro CF | 1–0 | 0–3 | 1–0 | — |

Updated to match(es) played on completed. Source: FutbolMe
Legend: Blue = home team win; Yellow = draw; Red = away team win.

=== Group A-4 ===
| Pos | Team | Pld | W | D | L | GF | GA | GD | Pts | Qualification or relegation |
|---|---|---|---|---|---|---|---|---|---|---|
| 1 | (Community of Madrid) DAV Santa Ana (substituted on) | 6 | 4 | 0 | 2 | 10 | 10 | 0 | 8 | Promoted to Segunda División B |
| 2 | (Galicia (Spain)) Celta Turista CF | 6 | 3 | 1 | 2 | 10 | 7 | +3 | 7 | |
| 3 | (Castile and León) Zamora CF | 6 | 2 | 1 | 3 | 7 | 5 | +2 | 5 | |
| 4 | (Asturias) Club Siero | 6 | 2 | 0 | 4 | 6 | 11 | −5 | 4 | |

Source: Fútbol Regional

| Home \ Away | CEL | DSA | SIE | ZAM |
|---|---|---|---|---|
| Celta Turista CF | — | 2–3 | 2–1 | 1–1 |
| DAV Santa Ana | 2–1 | — | 4–2 | 1–0 |
| Club Siero | 0–2 | 1–0 | — | 2–0 |
| Zamora CF | 0–1 | 4–0 | 2–0 | — |

Updated to match(es) played on completed. Source: FutbolMe
Legend: Blue = home team win; Yellow = draw; Red = away team win.

=== Group B-1 ===
| Pos | Team | Pld | W | D | L | GF | GA | GD | Pts | Qualification or relegation |
|---|---|---|---|---|---|---|---|---|---|---|
| 1 | (Aragon) SD Huesca (substituted on) | 6 | 3 | 1 | 2 | 12 | 7 | +5 | 7 | Promoted to Segunda División B |
| 2 | (La Rioja) CD Calahorra | 6 | 2 | 2 | 2 | 12 | 9 | +3 | 6 | |
| 3 | (Cantabria) CD Tropezón | 6 | 2 | 2 | 2 | 5 | 10 | −5 | 6 | |
| 4 | (Basque Country (autonomous community)) CD Hernani | 6 | 2 | 1 | 3 | 6 | 9 | −3 | 5 | |

Source: Fútbol Regional

| Home \ Away | CAL | HER | HUE | TRO |
|---|---|---|---|---|
| CD Calahorra | — | 0–1 | 1–1 | 7–0 |
| CD Hernani | 2–3 | — | 2–1 | 1–2 |
| SD Huesca | 5–1 | 3–0 | — | 1–0 |
| CD Tropezón | 0–0 | 0–0 | 3–1 | — |

Updated to match(es) played on completed. Source: FutbolMe
Legend: Blue = home team win; Yellow = draw; Red = away team win.

=== Group B-2 ===
| Pos | Team | Pld | W | D | L | GF | GA | GD | Pts | Qualification or relegation |
|---|---|---|---|---|---|---|---|---|---|---|
| 1 | (Basque Country (autonomous community)) SCD Durango (substituted on) | 6 | 5 | 0 | 1 | 12 | 4 | +8 | 10 | Promoted to Segunda División B |
| 2 | (Cantabria) Racing de Santander B | 6 | 4 | 1 | 1 | 12 | 1 | +11 | 9 | |
| 3 | (Aragon) Utebo FC | 6 | 2 | 1 | 3 | 4 | 9 | −5 | 5 | |
| 4 | (Navarre) SD Lagunak | 6 | 0 | 0 | 6 | 3 | 17 | −14 | 0 | |

Source: Fútbol Regional

| Home \ Away | DUR | LAG | RAC | UTE |
|---|---|---|---|---|
| SCD Durango | — | 3–1 | 1–0 | 4–1 |
| SD Lagunak | 1–3 | — | 0–6 | 0–1 |
| Racing de Santander B | 1–0 | 2–0 | — | 0–0 |
| Utebo FC | 0–1 | 2–1 | 1–1 | — |

Updated to match(es) played on completed. Source: FutbolMe
Legend: Blue = home team win; Yellow = draw; Red = away team win.

=== Group B-3 ===
| Pos | Team | Pld | W | D | L | GF | GA | GD | Pts | Qualification or relegation |
|---|---|---|---|---|---|---|---|---|---|---|
| 1 | (Aragon) CD Endesa Andorra (substituted on) | 6 | 5 | 1 | 0 | 15 | 4 | +11 | 11 | Promoted to Segunda División B |
| 2 | (Basque Country (autonomous community)) Zalla UC | 6 | 3 | 2 | 1 | 4 | 2 | +2 | 8 | |
| 3 | (Navarre) UCD Burladés | 6 | 1 | 1 | 4 | 6 | 13 | −7 | 3 | |
| 4 | (Cantabria) CD Bezana | 6 | 0 | 2 | 4 | 5 | 11 | −6 | 2 | |

Source: Fútbol Regional

| Home \ Away | BEZ | BUR | EAN | ZAL |
|---|---|---|---|---|
| CD Bezana | — | 1–1 | 2–3 | 0–0 |
| UCD Burladés | 3–1 | — | 1–4 | 1–2 |
| CD Endesa Andorra | 3–1 | 4–0 | — | 1–0 |
| Zalla UC | 1–0 | 1–0 | 0–0 | — |

Updated to match(es) played on completed. Source: FutbolMe
Legend: Blue = home team win; Yellow = draw; Red = away team win.

=== Group B-4 ===
| Pos | Team | Pld | W | D | L | GF | GA | GD | Pts | Qualification or relegation |
|---|---|---|---|---|---|---|---|---|---|---|
| 1 | (Basque Country (autonomous community)) CD Aurrerá de Vitoria (substituted on) | 6 | 4 | 1 | 1 | 13 | 2 | +11 | 9 | Promoted to Segunda División B |
| 2 | (Aragon) UD Barbastro | 6 | 4 | 0 | 2 | 10 | 6 | +4 | 8 | |
| 3 | (Navarre) Peña Sport FC | 6 | 2 | 1 | 3 | 8 | 4 | +4 | 5 | |
| 4 | (Cantabria) UM Escobedo | 6 | 1 | 0 | 5 | 2 | 21 | −19 | 2 | |

Source: Fútbol Regional

| Home \ Away | AUR | BAB | ESC | PÑS |
|---|---|---|---|---|
| CD Aurrerá de Vitoria | — | 1–0 | 5–0 | 1–0 |
| UD Barbastro | 2–1 | — | 4–1 | 1–0 |
| UM Escobedo | 0–5 | 0–2 | — | 1–0 |
| Peña Sport FC | 0–0 | 3–1 | 5–0 | — |

Updated to match(es) played on completed. Source: FutbolMe
Legend: Blue = home team win; Yellow = draw; Red = away team win.

=== Group C-1 ===
| Pos | Team | Pld | W | D | L | GF | GA | GD | Pts | Qualification or relegation |
|---|---|---|---|---|---|---|---|---|---|---|
| 1 | (Catalonia) FC Barcelona C (substituted on) | 6 | 5 | 0 | 1 | 15 | 2 | +13 | 10 | Promoted to Segunda División B |
| 2 | (Valencian Community) CF Gandía | 6 | 5 | 0 | 1 | 8 | 4 | +4 | 10 | |
| 3 | (Balearic Islands) CD Atlético Baleares | 6 | 1 | 1 | 4 | 5 | 9 | −4 | 3 | |
| 4 | (Region of Murcia) Muleño CF | 6 | 0 | 1 | 5 | 0 | 13 | −13 | 1 | |

Source: Fútbol Regional

| Home \ Away | BAL | BAR | GAN | MUL |
|---|---|---|---|---|
| CD Atlético Baleares | — | 1–2 | 0–3 | 3–0 |
| FC Barcelona C | 2–0 | — | 3–0 | 6–0 |
| CF Gandía | 2–1 | 1–0 | — | 1–0 |
| Muleño CF | 0–0 | 0–2 | 0–1 | — |

Updated to match(es) played on completed. Source: FutbolMe
Legend: Blue = home team win; Yellow = draw; Red = away team win.

=== Group C-2 ===
| Pos | Team | Pld | W | D | L | GF | GA | GD | Pts | Qualification or relegation |
|---|---|---|---|---|---|---|---|---|---|---|
| 1 | (Catalonia) RCD Español B (substituted on) | 6 | 3 | 2 | 1 | 11 | 5 | +6 | 8 | Promoted to Segunda División B |
| 2 | (Valencian Community) Pinoso CF | 6 | 2 | 2 | 2 | 9 | 9 | 0 | 6 | |
| 3 | (Region of Murcia) Águilas CF | 6 | 2 | 2 | 2 | 4 | 5 | −1 | 6 | |
| 4 | (Balearic Islands) CF Sóller | 6 | 0 | 4 | 2 | 5 | 10 | −5 | 4 | |

Source: Fútbol Regional

| Home \ Away | ÁGU | ESP | PIN | SÓL |
|---|---|---|---|---|
| Águilas CF | — | 2–1 | 1–0 | 0–0 |
| RCD Español B | 2–0 | — | 3–0 | 2–0 |
| Pinoso CF | 1–0 | 2–2 | — | 4–1 |
| CF Sóller | 1–1 | 1–1 | 2–2 | — |

Updated to match(es) played on completed. Source: FutbolMe
Legend: Blue = home team win; Yellow = draw; Red = away team win.

=== Group C-3 ===
| Pos | Team | Pld | W | D | L | GF | GA | GD | Pts | Qualification or relegation |
|---|---|---|---|---|---|---|---|---|---|---|
| 1 | (Valencian Community) Novelda CF (substituted on) | 6 | 5 | 0 | 1 | 13 | 6 | +7 | 10 | Promoted to Segunda División B |
| 2 | (Region of Murcia) Lorca CF | 6 | 4 | 1 | 1 | 12 | 9 | +3 | 9 | |
| 3 | (Catalonia) UE Tàrrega | 6 | 1 | 1 | 4 | 7 | 13 | −6 | 3 | |
| 4 | (Balearic Islands) UD Poblense | 6 | 1 | 0 | 5 | 10 | 14 | −4 | 2 | |

Source: Fútbol Regional

| Home \ Away | LOR | NOV | POB | TÀR |
|---|---|---|---|---|
| Lorca CF | — | 1–2 | 2–1 | 3–2 |
| Novelda CF | 0–1 | — | 4–3 | 2–1 |
| UD Poblense | 3–4 | 0–1 | — | 0–3 |
| UE Tàrrega | 1–1 | 0–3 | 0–3 | — |

Updated to match(es) played on completed. Source: FutbolMe
Legend: Blue = home team win; Yellow = draw; Red = away team win.

=== Group C-4 ===
| Pos | Team | Pld | W | D | L | GF | GA | GD | Pts | Qualification or relegation |
|---|---|---|---|---|---|---|---|---|---|---|
| 1 | (Balearic Islands) RCD Mallorca B (substituted on) | 6 | 3 | 2 | 1 | 11 | 5 | +6 | 8 | Promoted to Segunda División B |
| 2 | (Catalonia) Vilobí CF | 6 | 4 | 0 | 2 | 17 | 12 | +5 | 8 | |
| 3 | (Valencian Community) CD Onda | 6 | 2 | 3 | 1 | 10 | 7 | +3 | 7 | |
| 4 | (Region of Murcia) Jumilla CF | 6 | 0 | 1 | 5 | 2 | 16 | −14 | 1 | |

Source: Fútbol Regional

| Home \ Away | JUM | MAL | OND | VIL |
|---|---|---|---|---|
| Jumilla CF | — | 0–2 | 0–0 | 1–4 |
| RCD Mallorca B | 2–0 | — | 0–0 | 4–0 |
| CD Onda | 4–1 | 1–1 | — | 2–3 |
| Vilobí CF | 4–0 | 4–2 | 2–3 | — |

Updated to match(es) played on completed. Source: FutbolMe
Legend: Blue = home team win; Yellow = draw; Red = away team win.

=== Group D-1 ===
| Pos | Team | Pld | W | D | L | GF | GA | GD | Pts | Qualification or relegation |
|---|---|---|---|---|---|---|---|---|---|---|
| 1 | (Andalusia) UD San Pedro (substituted on) | 6 | 5 | 0 | 1 | 9 | 2 | +7 | 10 | Promoted to Segunda División B |
| 2 | (Castilla–La Mancha) Hellín Deportivo | 6 | 3 | 1 | 2 | 8 | 6 | +2 | 7 | |
| 3 | (Andalusia) Chiclana CF | 6 | 1 | 2 | 3 | 4 | 7 | −3 | 4 | |
| 4 | (Extremadura) CD Grabasa Burguillos | 6 | 1 | 1 | 4 | 3 | 9 | −6 | 3 | |

Source: Fútbol Regional

| Home \ Away | CHI | GBU | HEL | SPE |
|---|---|---|---|---|
| Chiclana CF | — | 1–1 | 0–1 | 0–1 |
| CD Grabasa Burguillos | 1–2 | — | 0–1 | 1–0 |
| Hellín Deportivo | 1–1 | 4–0 | — | 1–2 |
| UD San Pedro | 2–0 | 1–0 | 3–0 | — |

Updated to match(es) played on completed. Source: FutbolMe
Legend: Blue = home team win; Yellow = draw; Red = away team win.

=== Group D-2 ===
| Pos | Team | Pld | W | D | L | GF | GA | GD | Pts | Qualification or relegation |
|---|---|---|---|---|---|---|---|---|---|---|
| 1 | (Andalusia) Málaga CF (substituted on) | 6 | 4 | 1 | 1 | 16 | 6 | +10 | 9 | Promoted to Segunda División B |
| 2 | (Andalusia) Isla Cristina CD | 6 | 3 | 2 | 1 | 9 | 5 | +4 | 8 | |
| 3 | (Extremadura) Jerez CF | 6 | 3 | 0 | 3 | 11 | 9 | +2 | 6 | |
| 4 | (Castilla–La Mancha) Puertollano Industrial CF | 6 | 0 | 1 | 5 | 3 | 19 | −16 | 1 | |

Source: Fútbol Regional

| Home \ Away | ICR | JER | MGA | PUI |
|---|---|---|---|---|
| Isla Cristina CD | — | 2–1 | 2–0 | 3–1 |
| Jerez CF | 1–0 | — | 1–2 | 4–2 |
| Málaga CF | 2–2 | 3–1 | — | 6–0 |
| Puertollano Industrial CF | 0–0 | 0–3 | 0–3 | — |

Updated to match(es) played on completed. Source: FutbolMe
Legend: Blue = home team win; Yellow = draw; Red = away team win.

=== Group D-3 ===
| Pos | Team | Pld | W | D | L | GF | GA | GD | Pts | Qualification or relegation |
|---|---|---|---|---|---|---|---|---|---|---|
| 1 | (Andalusia) CD Utrera (substituted on) | 6 | 5 | 0 | 1 | 11 | 3 | +8 | 10 | Promoted to Segunda División B |
| 2 | (Andalusia) CP Ejido | 6 | 2 | 1 | 3 | 6 | 8 | −2 | 5 | |
| 3 | (Extremadura) CD Don Benito | 6 | 2 | 1 | 3 | 8 | 9 | −1 | 5 | |
| 4 | (Castilla–La Mancha) CD Torrijos | 6 | 2 | 0 | 4 | 6 | 11 | −5 | 4 | |

Source: Fútbol Regional

| Home \ Away | DBE | EJI | TOR | UTR |
|---|---|---|---|---|
| CD Don Benito | — | 1–3 | 4–0 | 0–4 |
| CP Ejido | 1–1 | — | 2–1 | 0–2 |
| CD Torrijos | 0–2 | 2–0 | — | 2–0 |
| CD Utrera | 1–0 | 1–0 | 3–1 | — |

Updated to match(es) played on completed. Source: FutbolMe
Legend: Blue = home team win; Yellow = draw; Red = away team win.

=== Group D-4 ===
| Pos | Team | Pld | W | D | L | GF | GA | GD | Pts | Qualification or relegation |
|---|---|---|---|---|---|---|---|---|---|---|
| 1 | (Andalusia) Vélez CF (substituted on) | 6 | 2 | 3 | 1 | 8 | 5 | +3 | 7 | Promoted to Segunda División B |
| 2 | (Castilla–La Mancha) Tomelloso CF | 6 | 2 | 3 | 1 | 4 | 2 | +2 | 7 | |
| 3 | (Extremadura) CD Badajoz B | 6 | 1 | 3 | 2 | 4 | 7 | −3 | 5 | |
| 4 | (Andalusia) CD Pozoblanco | 6 | 1 | 3 | 2 | 5 | 7 | −2 | 5 | |

Source: Fútbol Regional

Home \ Away

Updated to match(es) played on completed. Source: FutbolMe
Legend: Blue = home team win; Yellow = draw; Red = away team win.

=== Group E ===
| Pos | Team | Pld | W | D | L | GF | GA | GD | Pts | Qualification or relegation |
|---|---|---|---|---|---|---|---|---|---|---|
| 1 | (Canary Islands) UD Salud Tenerife (substituted on) | 6 | 4 | 0 | 2 | 14 | 4 | +10 | 8 | Promoted to Segunda División B |
| 2 | (Canary Islands) UD Gáldar | 6 | 4 | 0 | 2 | 7 | 8 | −1 | 8 | |
| 3 | (Canary Islands) Estrella CF | 6 | 2 | 0 | 4 | 9 | 14 | −5 | 4 | |
| 4 | (Canary Islands) UD Orotava | 6 | 2 | 0 | 4 | 8 | 12 | −4 | 4 | |

Source: Fútbol Regional

| Home \ Away | EST | GÁL | ORO | STE |
|---|---|---|---|---|
| Estrella CF | — | 1–2 | 5–0 | 2–1 |
| UD Gáldar | 1–0 | — | 2–0 | 2–1 |
| UD Orotava | 5–1 | 3–0 | — | 0–3 |
| UD Salud Tenerife | 5–0 | 3–0 | 1–0 | — |

Updated to match(es) played on completed. Source: FutbolMe
Legend: Blue = home team win; Yellow = draw; Red = away team win.

== Teams Promoted ==
17 teams were promoted to Segunda División B.

Group I – Galicia (Galicia (Spain))

- CD Endesa As Pontes
- RC Deportivo La Coruña B

Group II – Asturias

- None

Group III – Cantabria

- None

Group IV – Basque Country (Basque Country (autonomous community))

- CD Aurrerá de Vitoria
- SCD Durango

Group V – Catalonia

- RCD Español B
- FC Barcelona C

Group VI – Valencian Community

- Novelda CF

Group VII – Community of Madrid

- DAV Santa Ana

Group VIII – Castile and León

- Cultural y Deportiva Leonesa

Group IX – E. Andalusia and Melilla

- Málaga CF
- UD San Pedro
- Vélez CF

Group X – W. Andalusia and Ceuta

- CD Utrera

Group XI – Balearic Islands

- RCD Mallorca B

Group XII – Canary Islands

- UD Salud Tenerife

Group XIII – Region of Murcia

- None

Group XIV – Extremadura

- None

Group XV – Navarre and La Rioja

- None

Group XVI – Aragon

- CD Endesa Andorra
- SD Huesca

Group XVII – Castilla–La Mancha

- None
