= Galdón =

Galdón (Spanish pronunciation: [ɡalˈdon]) or Galdon is a Spanish surname. Notable people with the surname include:

- Joseph Galdon (1928 – 2010), Filipino Jesuit priest and writer
- Pablo Galdón (born 1985), Argentine tennis player
- Raúl Ibáñez Galdón (born 1972), retired Spanish footballer
