= 1994–95 Tercera División =

Tercera División
- Season: 1994–95

The 1994–95 Tercera División season is the 18th season since establishment the tier four.

== League table ==
=== Group 1 ===
| Pos | Team | Pld | W | D | L | GF | GA | GD | Pts | Qualification or relegation |
|---|---|---|---|---|---|---|---|---|---|---|
| 1 | CD Endesa As Pontes | 38 | 23 | 10 | 5 | 73 | 28 | +45 | 56 | Promotion play-offs |
| 2 | Viveiro CF | 38 | 21 | 9 | 8 | 57 | 30 | +27 | 51 | Promotion play-offs |
| 3 | Celta Turista | 38 | 21 | 8 | 9 | 64 | 30 | +34 | 50 | Promotion play-offs |
| 4 | Deportivo Coruña B | 38 | 19 | 10 | 9 | 75 | 38 | +37 | 48 | Promotion play-offs |
| 5 | CCD Cerceda | 38 | 18 | 11 | 9 | 54 | 40 | +14 | 47 | |
| 6 | Arosa SC | 38 | 16 | 13 | 9 | 55 | 39 | +16 | 45 | |
| 7 | CD Lalín | 38 | 18 | 9 | 11 | 47 | 37 | +10 | 45 | |
| 8 | Betanzos CF | 38 | 15 | 9 | 14 | 64 | 60 | +4 | 39 | |
| 9 | Puente Ourense CF | 38 | 14 | 10 | 14 | 53 | 50 | +3 | 38 | |
| 10 | Caselas FC | 38 | 13 | 11 | 14 | 50 | 58 | −8 | 37 | |
| 11 | SD Mindoniense | 38 | 11 | 15 | 12 | 39 | 42 | −3 | 37 | |
| 12 | CD Estradense | 38 | 13 | 11 | 14 | 38 | 40 | −2 | 37 | |
| 13 | UD Xove Lago | 38 | 7 | 19 | 12 | 44 | 59 | −15 | 33 | |
| 14 | SD Burela | 38 | 10 | 13 | 15 | 48 | 49 | −1 | 33 | |
| 15 | Gran Peña FC | 38 | 7 | 16 | 15 | 36 | 62 | −26 | 30 | |
| 16 | Villalonga CF | 38 | 9 | 12 | 17 | 34 | 59 | −25 | 30 | |
| 17 | UD Somozas | 38 | 9 | 12 | 17 | 37 | 55 | −18 | 30 | |
| 18 | RC Villalbés (R) | 38 | 11 | 7 | 20 | 36 | 57 | −21 | 29 | Relegation |
| 19 | Bergantiños CF (R) | 38 | 7 | 13 | 18 | 30 | 47 | −17 | 27 | Relegation |
| 20 | Órdenes CF (R) | 38 | 4 | 10 | 24 | 21 | 75 | −54 | 18 | Relegation |

Source: Fútbol Regional
(R) Relegated

=== Group 2 ===
| Pos | Team | Pld | W | D | L | GF | GA | GD | Pts | Qualification or relegation |
|---|---|---|---|---|---|---|---|---|---|---|
| 1 | Caudal Deportivo | 38 | 23 | 11 | 4 | 77 | 23 | +54 | 57 | Promotion play-offs |
| 2 | Club Siero | 38 | 23 | 7 | 8 | 79 | 39 | +40 | 53 | Promotion play-offs |
| 3 | CD Lealtad | 38 | 22 | 8 | 8 | 77 | 39 | +38 | 52 | Promotion play-offs |
| 4 | Real Titánico | 38 | 14 | 16 | 8 | 53 | 34 | +19 | 44 | Promotion play-offs |
| 5 | CD Turón | 38 | 16 | 12 | 10 | 57 | 41 | +16 | 44 | |
| 6 | SD Rey Aurelio | 38 | 14 | 13 | 11 | 32 | 37 | −5 | 41 | |
| 7 | Club Hispano de Castrillón | 38 | 16 | 8 | 14 | 53 | 52 | +1 | 40 | |
| 8 | Pumarín CF | 38 | 15 | 10 | 13 | 42 | 40 | +2 | 40 | |
| 9 | AD Universidad de Oviedo | 38 | 13 | 13 | 12 | 61 | 49 | +12 | 39 | |
| 10 | Club Marino de Luanco | 38 | 14 | 10 | 14 | 47 | 40 | +7 | 38 | |
| 11 | Navia CF | 38 | 13 | 12 | 13 | 37 | 36 | +1 | 38 | |
| 12 | CD Praviano | 38 | 12 | 12 | 14 | 42 | 60 | −18 | 36 | |
| 13 | UD Gijón Industrial | 38 | 14 | 6 | 18 | 59 | 63 | −4 | 34 | |
| 14 | Ribadesella CF | 38 | 12 | 8 | 18 | 47 | 58 | −11 | 32 | |
| 15 | Deportiva Piloñesa | 38 | 12 | 8 | 18 | 33 | 53 | −20 | 32 | |
| 16 | Navarro CF | 38 | 11 | 10 | 17 | 42 | 54 | −12 | 32 | |
| 17 | CD Tuilla (R) | 38 | 11 | 9 | 18 | 41 | 63 | −22 | 31 | Relegation |
| 18 | Candás CF (R) | 38 | 10 | 9 | 19 | 40 | 61 | −21 | 29 | Relegation |
| 19 | SD Lenense (R) | 38 | 10 | 9 | 19 | 40 | 63 | −23 | 29 | Relegation |
| 20 | Santiago de Aller CF (R) | 38 | 7 | 5 | 26 | 27 | 81 | −54 | 19 | Relegation |

Source: Fútbol Regional
(R) Relegated

=== Group 3 ===
| Pos | Team | Pld | W | D | L | GF | GA | GD | Pts | Qualification or relegation |
|---|---|---|---|---|---|---|---|---|---|---|
| 1 | Racing de Santander B | 38 | 23 | 11 | 4 | 87 | 24 | +63 | 57 | Promotion play-offs |
| 2 | CD Bezana | 38 | 16 | 17 | 5 | 46 | 22 | +24 | 49 | Promotion play-offs |
| 3 | UM Escobedo | 38 | 19 | 10 | 9 | 71 | 42 | +29 | 48 | Promotion play-offs |
| 4 | CD Tropezón | 38 | 17 | 13 | 8 | 50 | 28 | +22 | 47 | Promotion play-offs |
| 5 | CD Comillas | 38 | 17 | 13 | 8 | 50 | 36 | +14 | 47 | |
| 6 | CD Laredo | 38 | 17 | 11 | 10 | 56 | 41 | +15 | 45 | |
| 7 | SD Noja | 38 | 14 | 17 | 7 | 40 | 23 | +17 | 45 | |
| 8 | Ribamontán al Mar CF | 38 | 16 | 9 | 13 | 36 | 39 | −3 | 41 | |
| 9 | RS Gimnástica de Torrelavega B | 38 | 13 | 14 | 11 | 40 | 34 | +6 | 40 | |
| 10 | Castro FC | 38 | 15 | 8 | 15 | 42 | 41 | +1 | 38 | |
| 11 | SD Unión Club | 38 | 10 | 18 | 10 | 35 | 44 | −9 | 38 | |
| 12 | CD Guarnizo | 38 | 10 | 15 | 13 | 37 | 48 | −11 | 35 | |
| 13 | Velarde CF | 38 | 13 | 9 | 16 | 40 | 44 | −4 | 35 | |
| 14 | CD Cayón | 38 | 11 | 12 | 15 | 36 | 41 | −5 | 34 | |
| 15 | Marina de Cudeyo CF | 38 | 9 | 16 | 13 | 25 | 29 | −4 | 34 | |
| 16 | CD Colindres | 38 | 9 | 11 | 18 | 32 | 61 | −29 | 29 | |
| 17 | CD Pontejos | 38 | 7 | 14 | 17 | 29 | 50 | −21 | 28 | |
| 18 | Santoña CF (R) | 38 | 7 | 12 | 19 | 24 | 54 | −30 | 26 | Relegation |
| 19 | SD Barreda Balompié (R) | 38 | 6 | 11 | 21 | 21 | 68 | −47 | 23 | Relegation |
| 20 | CD Naval (R) | 38 | 6 | 9 | 23 | 27 | 55 | −28 | 21 | Relegation |

Source: Fútbol Regional
(R) Relegated

=== Group 4 ===
| Pos | Team | Pld | W | D | L | GF | GA | GD | Pts | Qualification or relegation |
|---|---|---|---|---|---|---|---|---|---|---|
| 1 | CD Aurrerá de Vitoria | 38 | 25 | 5 | 8 | 63 | 30 | +33 | 55 | Promotion play-offs |
| 2 | SCD Durango | 38 | 22 | 10 | 6 | 56 | 19 | +37 | 54 | Promotion play-offs |
| 3 | CD Hernani | 38 | 21 | 7 | 10 | 63 | 44 | +19 | 49 | Promotion play-offs |
| 4 | Zalla UC | 38 | 17 | 13 | 8 | 61 | 33 | +28 | 47 | Promotion play-offs |
| 5 | Balmaseda CF | 38 | 16 | 12 | 10 | 48 | 34 | +14 | 44 | |
| 6 | CD Getxo | 38 | 16 | 10 | 12 | 53 | 46 | +7 | 42 | |
| 7 | CD Basconia | 38 | 16 | 10 | 12 | 48 | 39 | +9 | 42 | |
| 8 | CD Elgoibar | 38 | 17 | 7 | 14 | 58 | 47 | +11 | 41 | |
| 9 | SD Urola KE | 38 | 14 | 10 | 14 | 54 | 50 | +4 | 38 | |
| 10 | SD Zamudio | 38 | 11 | 16 | 11 | 43 | 48 | −5 | 38 | |
| 11 | Mondragón CF | 38 | 14 | 9 | 15 | 38 | 44 | −6 | 37 | |
| 12 | SD Amorebieta | 38 | 13 | 11 | 14 | 47 | 57 | −10 | 37 | |
| 13 | CD Santurtzi | 38 | 12 | 12 | 14 | 32 | 31 | +1 | 36 | |
| 14 | CD Aurrerà Ondarroa | 38 | 9 | 16 | 13 | 38 | 51 | −13 | 34 | |
| 15 | Aloña Mendi KE | 38 | 10 | 14 | 14 | 47 | 61 | −14 | 34 | |
| 16 | Deportivo Alavés B | 38 | 11 | 10 | 17 | 39 | 52 | −13 | 32 | |
| 17 | CD Touring | 38 | 10 | 10 | 18 | 45 | 61 | −16 | 30 | |
| 18 | Tolosa CF (R) | 38 | 9 | 9 | 20 | 39 | 53 | −14 | 27 | Relegation |
| 19 | Arenas Club de Getxo (R) | 38 | 7 | 12 | 19 | 34 | 54 | −20 | 26 | Relegation |
| 20 | CD Munguía (R) | 38 | 4 | 9 | 25 | 32 | 84 | −52 | 17 | Relegation |

Source: Fútbol Regional
(R) Relegated

=== Group 5 ===
| Pos | Team | Pld | W | D | L | GF | GA | GD | Pts | Qualification or relegation |
|---|---|---|---|---|---|---|---|---|---|---|
| 1 | RCD Español B | 38 | 23 | 13 | 2 | 72 | 27 | +45 | 59 | Promotion play-offs |
| 2 | UE Tàrrega | 38 | 20 | 12 | 6 | 70 | 36 | +34 | 52 | Promotion play-offs |
| 3 | FC Barcelona C | 38 | 21 | 10 | 7 | 101 | 42 | +59 | 52 | Promotion play-offs |
| 4 | Vilobí CF | 38 | 17 | 14 | 7 | 68 | 51 | +17 | 48 | Promotion play-offs |
| 5 | UA Horta | 38 | 14 | 15 | 9 | 43 | 33 | +10 | 43 | |
| 6 | CF Gavà | 38 | 18 | 6 | 14 | 66 | 52 | +14 | 42 | |
| 7 | CF Balaguer | 38 | 15 | 10 | 13 | 44 | 40 | +4 | 40 | |
| 8 | CF Igualada | 38 | 12 | 16 | 10 | 48 | 42 | +6 | 40 | |
| 9 | Atlètic Roda de Barà | 38 | 14 | 12 | 12 | 47 | 49 | −2 | 40 | |
| 10 | CE Júpiter | 38 | 17 | 5 | 16 | 68 | 66 | +2 | 39 | |
| 11 | UE Sants | 38 | 14 | 9 | 15 | 51 | 56 | −5 | 37 | |
| 12 | CD Tortosa | 38 | 13 | 10 | 15 | 59 | 55 | +4 | 36 | |
| 13 | CD Banyoles | 38 | 12 | 11 | 15 | 53 | 56 | −3 | 35 | |
| 14 | UD Cerdanyola de Mataró | 38 | 11 | 13 | 14 | 61 | 65 | −4 | 35 | |
| 15 | UE Rubí | 38 | 12 | 9 | 17 | 43 | 59 | −16 | 33 | |
| 16 | EC Granollers | 38 | 12 | 8 | 18 | 31 | 41 | −10 | 32 | |
| 17 | CE Manresa (R) | 38 | 10 | 11 | 17 | 43 | 73 | −30 | 31 | Relegation |
| 18 | CF Badalona (R) | 38 | 10 | 10 | 18 | 45 | 68 | −23 | 30 | Relegation |
| 19 | FC Martinenc (R) | 38 | 12 | 6 | 20 | 40 | 59 | −19 | 30 | Relegation |
| 20 | CF Reus Deportiu (R) | 38 | 1 | 4 | 33 | 16 | 99 | −83 | 6 | Relegation |

Source: Fútbol Regional
(R) Relegated

=== Group 6 ===
| Pos | Team | Pld | W | D | L | GF | GA | GD | Pts | Qualification or relegation |
|---|---|---|---|---|---|---|---|---|---|---|
| 1 | CF Gandía | 38 | 23 | 12 | 3 | 64 | 30 | +34 | 58 | Promotion play-offs |
| 2 | CD Onda | 38 | 20 | 14 | 4 | 67 | 26 | +41 | 54 | Promotion play-offs |
| 3 | Novelda CF | 38 | 22 | 7 | 9 | 62 | 30 | +32 | 51 | Promotion play-offs |
| 4 | Pinoso CF | 38 | 19 | 13 | 6 | 66 | 35 | +31 | 51 | Promotion play-offs |
| 5 | Llíria CF | 38 | 19 | 11 | 8 | 56 | 29 | +27 | 49 | |
| 6 | UD Vall de Uxó | 38 | 20 | 9 | 9 | 55 | 38 | +17 | 49 | |
| 7 | Gimnástico CF | 38 | 15 | 12 | 11 | 49 | 38 | +11 | 42 | |
| 8 | CD Olímpic de Xàtiva | 38 | 16 | 9 | 13 | 45 | 40 | +5 | 41 | |
| 9 | CD Eldense | 38 | 13 | 14 | 11 | 44 | 47 | −3 | 40 | |
| 10 | Alicante CF | 38 | 13 | 13 | 12 | 52 | 45 | +7 | 39 | |
| 11 | CE Alberic | 38 | 14 | 10 | 14 | 35 | 39 | −4 | 38 | |
| 12 | SD Sueca | 38 | 12 | 12 | 14 | 38 | 36 | +2 | 36 | |
| 13 | CD Alaquàs | 38 | 11 | 11 | 16 | 44 | 49 | −5 | 33 | |
| 14 | CD Utiel | 38 | 8 | 17 | 13 | 43 | 48 | −5 | 33 | |
| 15 | Crevillente Deportivo | 38 | 9 | 14 | 15 | 35 | 47 | −12 | 32 | |
| 16 | Mutxamel CF | 38 | 10 | 11 | 17 | 34 | 49 | −15 | 31 | |
| 17 | CD Villena | 38 | 10 | 7 | 21 | 33 | 66 | −33 | 27 | |
| 18 | CD Jávea (R) | 38 | 7 | 12 | 19 | 23 | 48 | −25 | 26 | Relegation |
| 19 | UD Oliva (R) | 38 | 8 | 6 | 24 | 25 | 65 | −40 | 22 | Relegation |
| 20 | UD Horadada (R) | 38 | 1 | 6 | 31 | 25 | 90 | −65 | 8 | Relegation |

Source: Fútbol Regional
(R) Relegated

=== Group 7 ===
| Pos | Team | Pld | W | D | L | GF | GA | GD | Pts | Qualification or relegation |
|---|---|---|---|---|---|---|---|---|---|---|
| 1 | DAV Santa Ana | 42 | 21 | 14 | 7 | 69 | 42 | +27 | 56 | Promotion play-offs |
| 2 | CF Rayo Majadahonda | 42 | 22 | 11 | 9 | 74 | 50 | +24 | 55 | Promotion play-offs |
| 3 | CD Carabanchel | 42 | 21 | 12 | 9 | 65 | 49 | +16 | 54 | Promotion play-offs |
| 4 | CD Leganés B | 42 | 20 | 14 | 8 | 72 | 39 | +33 | 54 | Promotion play-offs |
| 5 | CD Pegaso | 42 | 21 | 8 | 13 | 60 | 56 | +4 | 50 | |
| 6 | AD Colmenar Viejo | 42 | 17 | 13 | 12 | 56 | 50 | +6 | 47 | |
| 7 | CD Fuencarral | 42 | 17 | 12 | 13 | 69 | 49 | +20 | 46 | |
| 8 | CD Las Rozas | 42 | 19 | 6 | 17 | 68 | 58 | +10 | 44 | |
| 9 | AD Parla | 42 | 17 | 9 | 16 | 72 | 56 | +16 | 43 | |
| 10 | SR Villaverde Boetticher CF | 42 | 14 | 15 | 13 | 48 | 49 | −1 | 43 | |
| 11 | CD Mejoreño | 42 | 15 | 11 | 16 | 53 | 58 | −5 | 41 | |
| 12 | CD San Fernando de Henares | 42 | 14 | 13 | 15 | 51 | 60 | −9 | 41 | |
| 13 | AD Orcasitas | 42 | 13 | 14 | 15 | 64 | 62 | +2 | 40 | |
| 14 | AD Torrejón | 42 | 15 | 9 | 18 | 53 | 54 | −1 | 39 | |
| 15 | AD Rayo Vallecano B | 42 | 13 | 13 | 16 | 50 | 55 | −5 | 39 | |
| 16 | CD Coslada | 42 | 13 | 11 | 18 | 51 | 68 | −17 | 37 | |
| 17 | CD Puerta Bonita | 42 | 11 | 15 | 16 | 50 | 58 | −8 | 37 | |
| 18 | Getafe CF B (R) | 42 | 13 | 11 | 18 | 59 | 59 | 0 | 37 | Relegation |
| 19 | CD Vicálvaro (R) | 42 | 10 | 16 | 16 | 38 | 50 | −12 | 36 | Relegation |
| 20 | AD Alcobendas (R) | 42 | 10 | 12 | 20 | 52 | 75 | −23 | 32 | Relegation |
| 21 | AD Alcorcón (R) | 42 | 9 | 13 | 20 | 51 | 76 | −25 | 31 | Relegation |
| 22 | CD El Álamo (R) | 42 | 6 | 10 | 26 | 40 | 92 | −52 | 22 | Relegation |

Source: Fútbol Regional
(R) Relegated

=== Group 8 ===
| Pos | Team | Pld | W | D | L | GF | GA | GD | Pts | Qualification or relegation |
|---|---|---|---|---|---|---|---|---|---|---|
| 1 | Cultural y Deportiva Leonesa | 36 | 21 | 13 | 2 | 75 | 19 | +56 | 55 | Promotion play-offs |
| 2 | CD Salmantino | 36 | 19 | 13 | 4 | 66 | 31 | +35 | 51 | Promotion play-offs |
| 3 | CA Bembibre | 36 | 19 | 11 | 6 | 68 | 32 | +36 | 49 | Promotion play-offs |
| 4 | Zamora CF | 36 | 19 | 11 | 6 | 65 | 20 | +45 | 49 | Promotion play-offs |
| 5 | CD Laguna | 36 | 19 | 8 | 9 | 63 | 29 | +34 | 46 | |
| 6 | SD Gimnástica Segoviana | 36 | 13 | 16 | 7 | 50 | 31 | +19 | 42 | |
| 7 | Arandina CF | 36 | 15 | 12 | 9 | 41 | 31 | +10 | 42 | |
| 8 | RCD Ribert | 36 | 13 | 14 | 9 | 46 | 42 | +4 | 40 | |
| 9 | Racing Lermeño | 36 | 13 | 11 | 12 | 47 | 48 | −1 | 37 | |
| 10 | SD Ponferradina | 36 | 14 | 8 | 14 | 44 | 41 | +3 | 36 | |
| 11 | La Bañeza CF | 36 | 11 | 12 | 13 | 38 | 52 | −14 | 34 | |
| 12 | CD Íscar Industrial | 36 | 13 | 6 | 17 | 34 | 46 | −12 | 32 | |
| 13 | SD Gimnástica Medinense | 36 | 13 | 6 | 17 | 33 | 49 | −16 | 32 | |
| 14 | SC Uxama | 36 | 9 | 12 | 15 | 42 | 64 | −22 | 30 | |
| 15 | SD Almazán | 36 | 11 | 8 | 17 | 35 | 52 | −17 | 30 | |
| 16 | CF Endesa Ponferrada | 36 | 9 | 7 | 20 | 41 | 70 | −29 | 25 | |
| 17 | CD Tardajos (R) | 36 | 5 | 12 | 19 | 31 | 69 | −38 | 22 | Relegation |
| 18 | CD Venta de Baños (R) | 36 | 4 | 8 | 24 | 28 | 73 | −45 | 16 | Relegation |
| 19 | Betis CF (R) | 36 | 4 | 8 | 24 | 28 | 76 | −48 | 16 | Relegation |

Source: Fútbol Regional
(R) Relegated

=== Group 9 ===
| Pos | Team | Pld | W | D | L | GF | GA | GD | Pts | Qualification or relegation |
|---|---|---|---|---|---|---|---|---|---|---|
| 1 | Málaga CF | 40 | 31 | 9 | 0 | 99 | 13 | +86 | 71 | Promotion play-offs |
| 2 | UD San Pedro | 40 | 32 | 2 | 6 | 99 | 24 | +75 | 66 | Promotion play-offs |
| 3 | Polideportivo Ejido | 40 | 26 | 8 | 6 | 78 | 27 | +51 | 60 | Promotion play-offs |
| 4 | Vélez CF | 40 | 25 | 7 | 8 | 95 | 34 | +61 | 57 | Promotion play-offs |
| 5 | CD Linares | 40 | 21 | 11 | 8 | 68 | 30 | +38 | 53 | |
| 6 | CF Antequera–Puerto Malagueño | 40 | 19 | 10 | 11 | 60 | 35 | +25 | 48 | |
| 7 | Juventud de Torremolinos CF | 40 | 19 | 7 | 14 | 73 | 41 | +32 | 45 | |
| 8 | Guadix CF | 40 | 17 | 10 | 13 | 63 | 43 | +20 | 44 | |
| 9 | Baeza CF | 40 | 17 | 10 | 13 | 57 | 43 | +14 | 44 | |
| 10 | CD Roquetas | 40 | 19 | 6 | 15 | 69 | 63 | +6 | 44 | |
| 11 | Atarfe Industrial CF | 40 | 18 | 5 | 17 | 59 | 62 | −3 | 41 | |
| 12 | Martos CF | 40 | 15 | 9 | 16 | 41 | 43 | −2 | 39 | |
| 13 | UD Maracena | 40 | 14 | 10 | 16 | 62 | 57 | +5 | 38 | |
| 14 | AD Adra | 40 | 16 | 6 | 18 | 44 | 46 | −2 | 38 | |
| 15 | Arenas de Armilla CD | 40 | 12 | 7 | 21 | 38 | 61 | −23 | 31 | |
| 16 | CD Baza | 40 | 12 | 6 | 22 | 35 | 60 | −25 | 30 | |
| 17 | Plus Ultra CF | 40 | 11 | 3 | 26 | 43 | 87 | −44 | 25 | |
| 18 | CD Real de Melilla (R) | 40 | 8 | 7 | 25 | 39 | 92 | −53 | 23 | Relegation |
| 19 | Club Atlético Estación (R) | 40 | 7 | 5 | 28 | 24 | 87 | −63 | 19 | Relegation |
| 20 | Recreativo Granada B (R) | 40 | 5 | 4 | 31 | 44 | 120 | −76 | 14 | Relegation |
| 21 | PD Garrucha (R) | 40 | 2 | 6 | 32 | 16 | 138 | −122 | 10 | Relegation |

Source: Fútbol Regional
(R) Relegated

=== Group 10 ===
| Pos | Team | Pld | W | D | L | GF | GA | GD | Pts | Qualification or relegation |
|---|---|---|---|---|---|---|---|---|---|---|
| 1 | CD Pozoblanco | 42 | 26 | 11 | 5 | 90 | 35 | +55 | 63 | Promotion play-offs |
| 2 | CD Utrera | 42 | 21 | 15 | 6 | 74 | 29 | +45 | 57 | Promotion play-offs |
| 3 | Chiclana CF | 42 | 19 | 17 | 6 | 63 | 40 | +23 | 55 | Promotion play-offs |
| 4 | Isla Cristina CD | 42 | 23 | 9 | 10 | 85 | 41 | +44 | 55 | Promotion play-offs |
| 5 | Viña Verde Montilla CD | 42 | 20 | 11 | 11 | 54 | 27 | +27 | 51 | |
| 6 | RB Linense | 42 | 20 | 9 | 13 | 68 | 45 | +23 | 49 | |
| 7 | UD Los Palacios | 42 | 16 | 15 | 11 | 63 | 52 | +11 | 47 | |
| 8 | CMD San Juan | 42 | 17 | 11 | 14 | 55 | 46 | +9 | 45 | |
| 9 | La Palma CF | 42 | 16 | 13 | 13 | 55 | 65 | −10 | 45 | |
| 10 | Cádiz CF B | 42 | 15 | 14 | 13 | 53 | 51 | +2 | 44 | |
| 11 | CD Mairena | 42 | 16 | 10 | 16 | 55 | 46 | +9 | 42 | |
| 12 | Atlético Sanluqueño CF | 42 | 16 | 10 | 16 | 47 | 55 | −8 | 42 | |
| 13 | Coria CF | 42 | 15 | 10 | 17 | 58 | 51 | +7 | 40 | |
| 14 | Dos Hermanas CF | 42 | 16 | 7 | 19 | 60 | 59 | +1 | 39 | |
| 15 | Jerez Industrial CF | 42 | 13 | 13 | 16 | 45 | 54 | −9 | 39 | |
| 16 | Conil CF | 42 | 12 | 15 | 15 | 46 | 55 | −9 | 39 | |
| 17 | Atlético Cortegana (R) | 42 | 13 | 10 | 19 | 50 | 67 | −17 | 36 | Relegation |
| 18 | Atlético Lucentino Industrial (R) | 42 | 13 | 8 | 21 | 40 | 59 | −19 | 34 | Relegation |
| 19 | UD Roteña (R) | 42 | 11 | 11 | 20 | 43 | 58 | −15 | 33 | Relegation |
| 20 | Club Atlético de Ceuta (R) | 42 | 9 | 6 | 27 | 43 | 96 | −53 | 24 | Relegation |
| 21 | Puente Genil CF (R) | 42 | 6 | 12 | 24 | 27 | 81 | −54 | 22 | Relegation |
| 22 | Sanlúcar CF (R) | 42 | 6 | 9 | 27 | 30 | 92 | −62 | 21 | Relegation |

Source: Fútbol Regional
(R) Relegated

=== Group 11 ===
| Pos | Team | Pld | W | D | L | GF | GA | GD | Pts | Qualification or relegation |
|---|---|---|---|---|---|---|---|---|---|---|
| 1 | RCD Mallorca B | 38 | 25 | 8 | 5 | 111 | 34 | +77 | 58 | Promotion play-offs |
| 2 | CD Atlético Baleares | 38 | 21 | 14 | 3 | 72 | 25 | +47 | 56 | Promotion play-offs |
| 3 | CF Sóller | 38 | 21 | 10 | 7 | 71 | 38 | +33 | 52 | Promotion play-offs |
| 4 | UD Poblense | 38 | 19 | 13 | 6 | 54 | 30 | +24 | 51 | Promotion play-offs |
| 5 | CD Playas de Calvià | 38 | 19 | 6 | 13 | 81 | 57 | +24 | 44 | |
| 6 | CD Manacor | 38 | 17 | 9 | 12 | 71 | 43 | +28 | 43 | |
| 7 | SCR Peña Deportiva | 38 | 16 | 10 | 12 | 46 | 37 | +9 | 42 | |
| 8 | CD Ferriolense | 38 | 14 | 13 | 11 | 54 | 38 | +16 | 41 | |
| 9 | CD Cala Millor | 38 | 14 | 11 | 13 | 47 | 50 | −3 | 39 | |
| 10 | CF Sporting Mahonés | 38 | 13 | 10 | 15 | 49 | 55 | −6 | 36 | |
| 11 | CD Constancia | 38 | 13 | 10 | 15 | 54 | 59 | −5 | 36 | |
| 12 | CD Cardassar | 38 | 13 | 9 | 16 | 52 | 59 | −7 | 35 | |
| 13 | CF Pollença | 38 | 10 | 13 | 15 | 42 | 57 | −15 | 33 | |
| 14 | CD Campos | 38 | 12 | 9 | 17 | 44 | 64 | −20 | 33 | |
| 15 | CD Alayor | 38 | 11 | 10 | 17 | 47 | 77 | −30 | 32 | |
| 16 | Atlètic de Ciutadella | 38 | 11 | 8 | 19 | 47 | 73 | −26 | 30 | |
| 17 | UD Arenal | 38 | 10 | 10 | 18 | 38 | 65 | −27 | 30 | |
| 18 | CD Montuiri (R) | 38 | 9 | 11 | 18 | 46 | 67 | −21 | 29 | Relegation |
| 19 | CD Binisalem (R) | 38 | 6 | 9 | 23 | 31 | 80 | −49 | 21 | Relegation |
| 20 | CD Felanitx (R) | 38 | 5 | 9 | 24 | 34 | 83 | −49 | 19 | Relegation |

Source: Fútbol Regional
(R) Relegated

=== Group 12 ===
| Pos | Team | Pld | W | D | L | GF | GA | GD | Pts | Qualification or relegation |
|---|---|---|---|---|---|---|---|---|---|---|
| 1 | Estrella CF | 38 | 19 | 16 | 3 | 46 | 15 | +31 | 54 | Promotion play-offs |
| 2 | UD Salud Tenerife | 38 | 21 | 10 | 7 | 76 | 37 | +39 | 52 | Promotion play-offs |
| 3 | UD Orotava | 38 | 21 | 8 | 9 | 68 | 41 | +27 | 50 | Promotion play-offs |
| 4 | UD Gáldar | 38 | 19 | 12 | 7 | 56 | 26 | +30 | 50 | Promotion play-offs |
| 5 | UD Vecindario | 38 | 17 | 14 | 7 | 52 | 24 | +28 | 48 | |
| 6 | Atlético Arona | 38 | 17 | 13 | 8 | 58 | 39 | +19 | 47 | |
| 7 | UD Las Palmas B | 38 | 15 | 15 | 8 | 66 | 32 | +34 | 45 | |
| 8 | UD Ibarra | 38 | 16 | 11 | 11 | 59 | 47 | +12 | 43 | |
| 9 | UD San Antonio | 38 | 16 | 10 | 12 | 59 | 43 | +16 | 42 | |
| 10 | SD Tenisca | 38 | 14 | 13 | 11 | 59 | 42 | +17 | 41 | |
| 11 | CD Arguineguín | 38 | 13 | 12 | 13 | 43 | 49 | −6 | 38 | |
| 12 | UD La Pared | 38 | 11 | 15 | 12 | 45 | 43 | +2 | 37 | |
| 13 | Real Artesano FC | 38 | 12 | 12 | 14 | 26 | 37 | −11 | 36 | |
| 14 | CD Maspalomas | 38 | 14 | 7 | 17 | 54 | 47 | +7 | 35 | |
| 15 | UD Telde | 38 | 9 | 13 | 16 | 40 | 70 | −30 | 31 | |
| 16 | UD Icodense | 38 | 7 | 15 | 16 | 35 | 64 | −29 | 29 | |
| 17 | UD Güímar | 38 | 8 | 12 | 18 | 26 | 48 | −22 | 28 | |
| 18 | AD Laguna (R) | 38 | 10 | 8 | 20 | 46 | 76 | −30 | 28 | Relegation |
| 19 | UD Gomera (R) | 38 | 4 | 11 | 23 | 22 | 73 | −51 | 19 | Relegation |
| 20 | CD San Andrés (R) | 38 | 3 | 1 | 34 | 19 | 102 | −83 | 7 | Relegation |

Source: Fútbol Regional
(R) Relegated

=== Group 13 ===
| Pos | Team | Pld | W | D | L | GF | GA | GD | Pts | Qualification or relegation |
|---|---|---|---|---|---|---|---|---|---|---|
| 1 | Lorca CF | 36 | 22 | 10 | 4 | 83 | 26 | +57 | 54 | Promotion play-offs |
| 2 | Águilas CF | 36 | 24 | 5 | 7 | 93 | 25 | +68 | 53 | Promotion play-offs |
| 3 | Jumilla CF | 36 | 18 | 11 | 7 | 48 | 32 | +16 | 47 | Promotion play-offs |
| 4 | Muleño CF | 36 | 19 | 7 | 10 | 46 | 33 | +13 | 45 | Promotion play-offs |
| 5 | Caravaca CF | 36 | 14 | 14 | 8 | 49 | 31 | +18 | 42 | |
| 6 | AD Relesa Las Palas | 36 | 14 | 14 | 8 | 58 | 26 | +32 | 42 | |
| 7 | Pinatar CF | 36 | 13 | 13 | 10 | 42 | 42 | 0 | 39 | |
| 8 | Abarán CF | 36 | 14 | 9 | 13 | 46 | 46 | 0 | 37 | |
| 9 | CD Torre Pacheco | 36 | 14 | 9 | 13 | 49 | 52 | −3 | 37 | |
| 10 | CD Roldán | 36 | 12 | 12 | 12 | 40 | 44 | −4 | 36 | |
| 11 | CD Cieza | 36 | 10 | 14 | 12 | 31 | 42 | −11 | 34 | |
| 12 | CD Beniel | 36 | 11 | 10 | 15 | 33 | 56 | −23 | 32 | |
| 13 | AD Mar Menor | 36 | 12 | 8 | 16 | 42 | 53 | −11 | 32 | |
| 14 | Club Olímpico de Totana | 36 | 11 | 9 | 16 | 43 | 59 | −16 | 31 | |
| 15 | CF Cutillas Fortuna | 36 | 9 | 11 | 16 | 36 | 48 | −12 | 29 | |
| 16 | CF Santomera | 36 | 10 | 7 | 19 | 28 | 49 | −21 | 27 | |
| 17 | Real Murcia CF B (R) | 36 | 10 | 7 | 19 | 42 | 57 | −15 | 27 | Relegation |
| 18 | CD Dolores de Pacheco (R) | 36 | 6 | 11 | 19 | 31 | 68 | −37 | 23 | Relegation |
| 19 | Cartagena FC B | 36 | 5 | 7 | 24 | 27 | 78 | −51 | 17 | Relegation |
| 20 | Atlético Murcia (R) | 0 | 0 | 0 | 0 | 0 | 0 | 0 | 0 | Relegation |

Source: Fútbol Regional
(R) Relegated

=== Group 14 ===
| Pos | Team | Pld | W | D | L | GF | GA | GD | Pts | Qualification or relegation |
|---|---|---|---|---|---|---|---|---|---|---|
| 1 | CD Don Benito | 38 | 26 | 7 | 5 | 92 | 30 | +62 | 59 | Promotion play-offs |
| 2 | Jerez CF | 38 | 26 | 6 | 6 | 87 | 23 | +64 | 58 | Promotion play-offs |
| 3 | CD Badajoz B | 38 | 24 | 9 | 5 | 65 | 14 | +51 | 57 | Promotion play-offs |
| 4 | CD Grabasa Burguillos | 38 | 23 | 8 | 7 | 69 | 33 | +36 | 54 | Promotion play-offs |
| 5 | UP Plasencia | 38 | 23 | 7 | 8 | 100 | 31 | +69 | 53 | |
| 6 | Moralo CP | 38 | 22 | 8 | 8 | 72 | 38 | +34 | 52 | |
| 7 | SP Villafranca | 38 | 19 | 11 | 8 | 57 | 39 | +18 | 49 | |
| 8 | UD Frexnense | 38 | 17 | 14 | 7 | 58 | 37 | +21 | 48 | |
| 9 | UD Mérida Promesas | 38 | 20 | 6 | 12 | 61 | 31 | +30 | 46 | |
| 10 | CD Castuera | 38 | 14 | 11 | 13 | 62 | 48 | +14 | 39 | |
| 11 | CP Malpartida Cacereño (R) | 38 | 15 | 6 | 17 | 63 | 58 | +5 | 36 | Relegation |
| 12 | UC La Estrella | 38 | 12 | 10 | 16 | 48 | 51 | −3 | 34 | |
| 13 | CP Guareña | 38 | 10 | 9 | 19 | 36 | 61 | −25 | 29 | |
| 14 | CD Coria | 38 | 11 | 6 | 21 | 62 | 81 | −19 | 28 | |
| 15 | CD Santa Amalia | 38 | 11 | 6 | 21 | 34 | 65 | −31 | 28 | |
| 16 | UD Fornacense | 38 | 10 | 5 | 23 | 40 | 82 | −42 | 23 | |
| 17 | CD Azuaga | 38 | 8 | 10 | 20 | 44 | 78 | −34 | 26 | |
| 18 | CF Trujillo (R) | 38 | 7 | 7 | 24 | 37 | 83 | −46 | 21 | Relegation |
| 19 | AD Llerenense (R) | 38 | 5 | 5 | 28 | 24 | 98 | −74 | 13 | Relegation |
| 20 | CD Miajadas (R) | 38 | 1 | 1 | 36 | 19 | 149 | −130 | 3 | Relegation |

Source: Fútbol Regional
(R) Relegated

=== Group 15 ===
| Pos | Team | Pld | W | D | L | GF | GA | GD | Pts | Qualification or relegation |
|---|---|---|---|---|---|---|---|---|---|---|
| 1 | CD Calahorra | 38 | 27 | 5 | 6 | 87 | 25 | +62 | 59 | Promotion play-offs |
| 2 | Peña Sport FC | 38 | 21 | 12 | 5 | 62 | 31 | +31 | 54 | Promotion play-offs |
| 3 | UCD Burladés | 38 | 19 | 12 | 7 | 52 | 28 | +24 | 50 | Promotion play-offs |
| 4 | SD Lagunak | 38 | 18 | 10 | 10 | 64 | 42 | +22 | 46 | Promotion play-offs |
| 5 | AD Noáin | 38 | 18 | 8 | 12 | 42 | 29 | +13 | 44 | |
| 6 | CD Alfaro | 38 | 15 | 13 | 10 | 69 | 45 | +24 | 43 | |
| 7 | UDC Chantrea | 38 | 15 | 12 | 11 | 65 | 52 | +13 | 42 | |
| 8 | CD Baztán | 38 | 14 | 13 | 11 | 54 | 55 | −1 | 41 | |
| 9 | CD Oberena | 38 | 14 | 12 | 12 | 59 | 46 | +13 | 40 | |
| 10 | CD La Calzada | 38 | 13 | 13 | 12 | 49 | 49 | 0 | 39 | |
| 11 | CD Beti Onak | 38 | 15 | 8 | 15 | 50 | 52 | −2 | 38 | |
| 12 | AD San Juan | 38 | 13 | 10 | 15 | 38 | 45 | −7 | 36 | |
| 13 | CD Egüés | 38 | 15 | 6 | 17 | 57 | 60 | −3 | 36 | |
| 14 | CA Artajonés | 38 | 10 | 14 | 14 | 50 | 49 | +1 | 34 | |
| 15 | CA River Ebro | 38 | 12 | 10 | 16 | 54 | 60 | −6 | 34 | |
| 16 | CD Varea | 38 | 10 | 13 | 15 | 44 | 62 | −18 | 33 | |
| 17 | CD Ribaforada | 38 | 12 | 7 | 19 | 57 | 62 | −5 | 31 | |
| 18 | CD Mirandés (R) | 38 | 9 | 8 | 21 | 41 | 73 | −32 | 26 | Relegation |
| 19 | Haro Deportivo (R) | 38 | 7 | 7 | 24 | 37 | 87 | −50 | 21 | Relegation |
| 20 | Peña Balsamaiso CF (R) | 38 | 3 | 7 | 28 | 30 | 109 | −79 | 13 | Relegation |

Source: Fútbol Regional
(R) Relegated

=== Group 16 ===
| Pos | Team | Pld | W | D | L | GF | GA | GD | Pts | Qualification or relegation |
|---|---|---|---|---|---|---|---|---|---|---|
| 1 | CD Endesa Andorra | 38 | 27 | 7 | 4 | 97 | 25 | +72 | 61 | Promotion play-offs |
| 2 | SD Huesca | 38 | 24 | 12 | 2 | 87 | 27 | +60 | 60 | Promotion play-offs |
| 3 | Utebo FC | 38 | 26 | 7 | 5 | 86 | 25 | +61 | 59 | Promotion play-offs |
| 4 | UD Barbastro | 38 | 24 | 7 | 7 | 79 | 32 | +47 | 55 | Promotion play-offs |
| 5 | CD Teruel | 38 | 21 | 9 | 8 | 74 | 33 | +41 | 51 | |
| 6 | CD Sariñena | 38 | 19 | 9 | 10 | 54 | 44 | +10 | 47 | |
| 7 | CD Binéfar | 38 | 17 | 8 | 13 | 72 | 43 | +29 | 42 | |
| 8 | UD Fraga | 38 | 17 | 7 | 14 | 72 | 48 | +24 | 41 | |
| 9 | CD La Almunia | 38 | 16 | 6 | 16 | 64 | 79 | −15 | 38 | |
| 10 | CF Figueruelas | 38 | 13 | 9 | 16 | 52 | 53 | −1 | 35 | |
| 11 | CJD Tamarite | 38 | 12 | 11 | 15 | 47 | 53 | −6 | 35 | |
| 12 | CF Hernán Cortes | 38 | 15 | 4 | 19 | 53 | 74 | −21 | 34 | |
| 13 | CD Caspe | 38 | 11 | 11 | 16 | 30 | 46 | −16 | 33 | |
| 14 | Alcañiz CF | 38 | 9 | 12 | 17 | 39 | 56 | −17 | 30 | |
| 15 | Atlético Monzalbarba | 38 | 9 | 12 | 17 | 39 | 67 | −28 | 30 | |
| 16 | CF Lalueza | 38 | 11 | 6 | 21 | 47 | 63 | −16 | 28 | |
| 17 | CD Utrillas | 38 | 10 | 5 | 23 | 39 | 84 | −45 | 25 | |
| 18 | AD Sabiñánigo (R) | 38 | 7 | 9 | 22 | 50 | 102 | −52 | 23 | Relegation |
| 19 | SD Tarazona (R) | 38 | 8 | 5 | 25 | 38 | 97 | −59 | 21 | Relegation |
| 20 | CD Alcorisa (R) | 38 | 5 | 2 | 31 | 36 | 104 | −68 | 12 | Relegation |

Source: Fútbol Regional
(R) Relegated

=== Group 17 ===
| Pos | Team | Pld | W | D | L | GF | GA | GD | Pts | Qualification or relegation |
|---|---|---|---|---|---|---|---|---|---|---|
| 1 | Hellín Deportivo | 38 | 23 | 9 | 6 | 94 | 31 | +63 | 55 | Promotion play-offs |
| 2 | Tomelloso CF | 38 | 23 | 9 | 6 | 85 | 22 | +63 | 55 | Promotion play-offs |
| 3 | Puertollano Industrial CF | 38 | 23 | 8 | 7 | 85 | 32 | +53 | 54 | Promotion play-offs |
| 4 | CD Torrijos | 38 | 21 | 9 | 8 | 68 | 31 | +37 | 51 | Promotion play-offs |
| 5 | CP Villarrobledo | 38 | 19 | 9 | 10 | 73 | 29 | +44 | 47 | |
| 6 | CF Gimnástico Alcázar | 38 | 17 | 12 | 9 | 62 | 36 | +26 | 46 | |
| 7 | Manzanares CF | 38 | 15 | 12 | 11 | 50 | 42 | +8 | 42 | |
| 8 | CF Valdepeñas | 38 | 14 | 14 | 10 | 53 | 36 | +17 | 42 | |
| 9 | AD Campillo | 38 | 14 | 14 | 10 | 66 | 33 | +33 | 42 | |
| 10 | CD Azuqueca | 38 | 13 | 14 | 11 | 64 | 60 | +4 | 40 | |
| 11 | CD Guadalajara | 38 | 14 | 12 | 12 | 51 | 48 | +3 | 40 | |
| 12 | CF La Solana | 38 | 13 | 13 | 12 | 49 | 42 | +7 | 39 | |
| 13 | Daimiel CF | 38 | 14 | 9 | 15 | 47 | 54 | −7 | 37 | |
| 14 | CD Mavisa Villacañas | 38 | 11 | 14 | 13 | 49 | 39 | +10 | 36 | |
| 15 | UB Conquense | 38 | 13 | 9 | 16 | 45 | 44 | +1 | 35 | |
| 16 | Almagro CF | 38 | 12 | 10 | 16 | 50 | 53 | −3 | 34 | |
| 17 | CD Yuncos (R) | 38 | 11 | 7 | 20 | 42 | 70 | −28 | 29 | Relegation |
| 18 | CD La Roda (R) | 38 | 8 | 10 | 20 | 40 | 76 | −36 | 26 | Relegation |
| 19 | CD Los Yébenes (R) | 38 | 3 | 2 | 33 | 19 | 169 | −150 | 8 | Relegation |
| 20 | Atlético Pedro Muñoz CF (R) | 38 | 0 | 2 | 36 | 18 | 163 | −145 | 2 | Relegation |

Source: Fútbol Regional
(R) Relegated

== Promotion play-off ==
Source:
