= Raúl Ibáñez (footballer) =

Spanish footballer (born 1972)

Personal information
- Full name: Raúl Ibáñez Galdón
- Date of birth: 10 November 1972 (age 53)
- Place of birth: Tous, Spain
- Height: 1.77 m (5 ft 9 1/2 in)
- Position: Forward

Youth career
- Elche

Senior career*
Years	Team	Apps	(Gls)
1989–1992	Alzira	50	(1)
1992–1993	Tomelloso	33	(6)
1993–1995	Valencia B	52	(11)
1995	Valencia	4	(1)
1995–1998	Valladolid	57	(2)
1997–1998	→ Levante (loan)	18	(2)
1998–1999	Puebla		
1999–2000	Elche	12	(1)
2000–2001	Valladolid	0	(0)
2001–2004	Cultural Leonesa	77	(12)
2004–2005	Tomelloso	16	(4)
2005	Burriana		
2006	Burjassot		
2006	Olímpic Xàtiva		
- * Club domestic league appearances and goals

Raúl Ibáñez Galdón (born 10 November 1972) is a Spanish retired footballer who played as a forward.

== Club career ==
Born in Tous, Valencia, Ibáñez began his career in his local community, being noticed by Valencia CF in the 1994 summer and moving to the reserve team. He made his La Liga debut on 9 April 1995, playing 37 minutes in a 0–0 away draw against Celta de Vigo, and started the following week, scoring his first and only top flight goal as the Che won it at home over Real Betis (2–1); he suffered a serious injury in the season's final stretch.

After that sole campaign, Ibáñez moved to Real Valladolid, being regularly used as a substitute – only 16 starts in two full seasons combined – and also being loaned to Levante UD for 1997–98, suffering Segunda División relegation with the team. He then spent some months with Puebla FC, joining compatriot Miguel Pardeza in the Mexican club.

After an unassuming second division campaign with Elche CF (less than one third of the games played, 512 minutes of action), Ibáñez returned to Valladolid and the Spanish top flight in the 2000 summer, but did not take part in any matches due to injuries and loss of form. Subsequently, he resumed his career in the lower leagues, with Cultural y Deportiva Leonesa, Tomelloso CF, CD Burriana, Burjassot CF and CD Olímpic de Xàtiva, retiring in late 2006 at the age of 34.
