= CF Platges de Calvià B =

Spanish football club

Platges de Calvià B
- Full name: Club de Fútbol Platges de Calvià "B"
- Founded: 1976; 2016 (reserve team)
- Ground: Municipal de Magaluf, Calviá, Majorca, Balearic Islands, Spain
- Capacity: 1,364
- President: (Spain) Armando Lupo Pérez Costas
- Head coach: (Spain) Toni Martínez
- League: División de Honor – Mallorca
- 2024–25: División de Honor – Mallorca, 9th of 18
Home colours	Away colours

Club de Fútbol Platges de Calvià B is a football team based in Montuïri, Balearic Islands. Founded in 1976, the team plays in División de Honor – Mallorca, holding home games at the Poliesportiu Municipal de Magaluf.

Since 2016, the club is the reserve team of CF Platges de Calvià.

== History ==
Founded in 1976 as CD Cade Paguera, the club changed to CF Platges de Calvià in 1990 after a fusion with CD Santa Ponsa and CD Maganova-Juve, and spent 23 seasons in Tercera División before absorbing CD Montuïri in June 2016. The first-team eventually took Montuïri's place in the fourth division, while the original CF Platges de Calvià, who had been relegated, became the club's reserve team.

== Season to season ==
- As CD Cade Paguera

Season	Tier	Division	Place	Copa del Rey
1976–77	7	3ª Reg.	14th	
1977–78	8	3ª Reg.	2nd	
1978–79	7	2ª Reg.	8th	
1979–80	6	1ª Reg.	5th	
1980–81	6	1ª Reg.	3rd	
1981–82	5	Reg. Pref.	7th	
1982–83	5	Reg. Pref.	3rd	

Season	Tier	Division	Place	Copa del Rey
1983–84	5	Reg. Pref.	3rd	
1984–85	5	Reg. Pref.	4th	
1985–86	5	Reg. Pref.	11th	
1986–87	5	Reg. Pref.	5th	
1987–88	4	3ª	13th	
1988–89	4	3ª	5th	
1989–90	4	3ª	4th	

- As CF Platges de Calvià

Season	Tier	Division	Place	Copa del Rey
1990–91	4	3ª	1st	
1991–92	4	3ª	6th	
1992–93	4	3ª	4th	
1993–94	4	3ª	5th	
1994–95	4	3ª	5th	
1995–96	4	3ª	2nd	
1996–97	4	3ª	11th	
1997–98	4	3ª	13th	
1998–99	4	3ª	8th	
1999–2000	4	3ª	10th	
2000–01	4	3ª	10th	
2001–02	4	3ª	11th	
2002–03	4	3ª	11th	

Season	Tier	Division	Place	Copa del Rey
2003–04	4	3ª	14th	
2004–05	4	3ª	15th	
2005–06	4	3ª	18th	
2006–07	5	Reg. Pref.	14th	
2007–08	5	Reg. Pref.	10th	
2008–09	5	Reg. Pref.	9th	
2009–10	5	Reg. Pref.	5th	
2010–11	5	Reg. Pref.	4th	
2011–12	4	3ª	18th	
2012–13	5	Reg. Pref.	2nd	
2013–14	4	3ª	12th	
2014–15	4	3ª	17th	
2015–16	4	3ª	18th	

- As CF Platges de Calvià B

Season	Tier	Division	Place
2016–17	5	Reg. Pref.	19th
2017–18	6	1ª Reg.	9th
2018–19	6	1ª Reg.	11
2019–20	6	1ª Reg.	17th
2020–21	6	1ª Reg.	5th
2021–22	7	1ª Reg.	11th
2022–23	7	1ª Reg.	1st
2023–24	6	Reg. Pref.	8th
2024–25	6	Div. Hon.	9th
2025–26	6	Div. Hon.	

- 23 seasons in Tercera División
