= Gimnástica Medinense =

- Full name: Gimnástica Medinense
- Founded: 1960
- Ground: Municipal, Medina del Campo, Valladolid, Castile and León, Spain
- Capacity: 700
- President: José Julio López Morchón
- Head coach: Alberto Sánchez
- League: Primera Provincial – Valladolid
- 2024–25: Primera Regional – Group B, 16th of 16 (relegated)
Home colours	Away colours

Gimnástica Medinense is a Spanish football team based in Medina del Campo, Valladolid, in the autonomous community of Castile and León. Founded in 1960, it plays in Primera Provincial – Valladolid, holding home matches at Estadio Municipal de Medina del Campo, which has a capacity of 700 people.

== History ==
Founded in 1960 as Sociedad Deportiva Gimnástica Medinense, the club achieved promotion to Tercera División in 1962, as champions. After five seasons in the fourth tier, the club suffered relegation back to the regional leagues, only returning to the fourth tier in 1980.

In 1988, Gimnástica Medinense achieved promotion to Segunda División B for the first time in their history, but was immediately relegated back. They also remain as the only club of the province outside of the city of Valladolid which played in the third division.

=== Club background ===
- Sociedad Deportiva Gimnástica Medinense (1960–2007)
- Gimnástica Medinense (2007–present)

== Season to season ==
Season	Tier	Division	Place	Copa del Rey
1961–62	4	1ª Reg.		
1962–63	4	1ª Reg.	1st	
1963–64	3	3ª	11th	
1964–65	3	3ª	10th	
1965–66	3	3ª	6th	
1966–67	3	3ª	10th	
1967–68	3	3ª	15th	
1968–69	4	1ª Reg.	3rd	
1969–70	4	1ª Reg.	4th	
1970–71	5	1ª Reg.	4th	
1971–72	5	1ª Reg.	1st	
1972–73	4	Reg. Pref.	4th	
1973–74	4	Reg. Pref.	7th	
1974–75	4	Reg. Pref.	16th	
1975–76	5	1ª Reg.	1st	
1976–77	4	Reg. Pref.	7th	
1977–78	5	Reg. Pref.	8th	
1978–79	5	Reg. Pref.	6th	
1979–80	5	Reg. Pref.	2nd	
1980–81	4	3ª	10th	

Season	Tier	Division	Place	Copa del Rey
1981–82	4	3ª	9th	
1982–83	4	3ª	6th	
1983–84	4	3ª	16th	First round
1984–85	4	3ª	7th	
1985–86	4	3ª	13th	First round
1986–87	4	3ª	20th	
1987–88	4	3ª	1st	
1988–89	3	2ª B	20th	
1989–90	4	3ª	6th	
1990–91	4	3ª	8th	First round
1991–92	4	3ª	16th	Second round
1992–93	4	3ª	16th	
1993–94	4	3ª	10th	
1994–95	4	3ª	13th	
1995–96	4	3ª	18th	
1996–97	5	Reg. Pref.	14th	
1997–98	5	Reg. Pref.	2nd	
1998–99	5	Reg. Pref.	2nd	
1999–2000	4	3ª	13th	
2000–01	4	3ª	5th	

Season	Tier	Division	Place	Copa del Rey
2001–02	4	3ª	7th	
2002–03	4	3ª	16th	
2003–04	4	3ª	16th	
2004–05	4	3ª	18th	
2005–06	5	1ª Reg.	13th	
2006–07	5	1ª Reg.	5th	
2007–08	5	1ª Reg.	9th	
2008–09	5	1ª Reg.	7th	
2009–10	5	1ª Reg.	11th	
2010–11	5	1ª Reg.	4th	
2011–12	5	1ª Reg.	14th	
2012–13	5	1ª Reg.	12th	
2013–14	5	1ª Reg.	8th	
2014–15	5	1ª Reg.	17th	
2015–16	6	1ª Prov.	4th	
2016–17	6	1ª Prov.	2nd	
2017–18	6	1ª Prov.	3rd	
2018–19	6	1ª Prov.	10th	
2019–20	6	1ª Prov.	2nd	
2020–21	DNP			

Season	Tier	Division	Place	Copa del Rey
2021–22	7	1ª Prov.	3rd	
2022–23	7	1ª Prov.	1st	
2023–24	6	1ª Reg.	14th	
2024–25	6	1ª Reg.	16th	
2025–26	7	1ª Prov.	4th	
2026–27	7	1ª Prov.		

- 1 season in Segunda División B
- 26 seasons in Tercera División
