= Vilobí CF =

Spanish football team

Vilobí
- Full name: Vilobí Club de Futbol
- Founded: 1975
- Dissolved: 2004
- Ground: Municipal, Vilobí d'Onyar, Catalonia, Spain
- Capacity: 1,000
- 2000–01: 3ª – Group 5, 19th of 20
Home colours

Vilobí Club de Futbol was a Spanish football team based in Vilobí d'Onyar, Girona, in the autonomous community of Catalonia. Founded in 1975, the club was dissolved in 2004.

== History ==
Founded in 1975, Vilobí played in the regional leagues until 1990, when the club achieved a first-ever promotion to Tercera División. They played in the category for 11 consecutive seasons, with their best input coming in 1994–95, where they narrowly missed out promotion in the play-offs.

In June 2001, after suffering relegation, Vilobí resigned to play in the Primera Catalana, only keeping their youth sides active. On 4 June 2004, the club was dissolved after having their three youth teams absorbed by Girona FC.

=== Club background ===
- Unión Deportiva Viloví (1975–1981)
- Vilobí Club de Futbol (1981–2004)

== Season to season ==
Season	Tier	Division	Place	Copa del Rey
1975–76	7	3ª Reg.	10th	
1976–77	7	3ª Reg.	10th	
1977–78	8	3ª Reg.	1st	
1978–79	7	2ª Reg.	8th	
1979–80	7	2ª Reg.	6th	
1980–81	7	2ª Reg.	1st	
1981–82	6	1ª Reg.	2nd	
1982–83	6	1ª Reg.	5th	
1983–84	6	1ª Reg.	1st	
1984–85	5	Reg. Pref.	4th	
1985–86	5	Reg. Pref.	10th	
1986–87	5	Reg. Pref.	7th	
1987–88	5	Reg. Pref.	8th	

Season	Tier	Division	Place	Copa del Rey
1988–89	5	Reg. Pref.	2nd	
1989–90	5	Reg. Pref.	1st	
1990–91	4	3ª	5th	
1991–92	4	3ª	10th	Second round
1992–93	4	3ª	15th	
1993–94	4	3ª	8th	
1994–95	4	3ª	4th	
1995–96	4	3ª	8th	
1996–97	4	3ª	6th	
1997–98	4	3ª	9th	
1998–99	4	3ª	15th	
1999–2000	4	3ª	11th	
2000–01	4	3ª	19th	

- 11 seasons in Tercera División
