= CD Burguillos =

Spanish football club

Burguillos
- Full name: Club Deportivo Burguillos
- Founded: 1963
- Ground: Los Centenales, Burguillos del Cerro, Extremadura, Spain
- Capacity: 1,000
- Chairman: (Spain) Enrique Asensio
- Manager: (Spain) Manuel Pizarro
- 2012–13: Regional Preferente – Group 3, 14th of 16 (relegated)
Home colours	Away colours

Club Deportivo Burguillos is a Spanish football team based in Burguillos del Cerro, in the autonomous community of Extremadura. Founded in 1963, it is focused on youth football, holding home games at Estadio Municipal Los Centenales.

== Season to season ==
Season	Tier	Division	Place	Copa del Rey
1963–1972	—	Regional	—	
1972–73	5	2ª Reg.	10th	
1973–74	5	2ª Reg.	10th	
1974–75	5	1ª Reg.	7th	
1975–76	5	1ª Reg.	14th	
1976–77	5	1ª Reg.	(R)	
1977–78	DNP			
1978–79	DNP			
1979–80	6	1ª Reg.	15th	
1980–81	6	1ª Reg.	4th	
1981–82	6	1ª Reg.	4th	
1982–83	6	1ª Reg.	3rd	
1983–84	5	Reg. Pref.	19th	
1984–85	6	1ª Reg.	1st	
1985–86	5	Reg. Pref.	17th	
1986–87	6	1ª Reg.	1st	
1987–88	5	Reg. Pref.	17th	
1988–89	5	Reg. Pref.	6th	
1989–90	5	Reg. Pref.	11th	
1990–91	5	Reg. Pref.	15th	
1991–92	5	Reg. Pref.	2nd	

Season	Tier	Division	Place	Copa del Rey
1992–93	4	3ª	9th	
1993–94	4	3ª	7th	
1994–95	4	3ª	4th	
1995–96	4	3ª	10th	
1996–97	4	3ª	4th	
1997–98	4	3ª	6th	
1998–99	4	3ª	1st	
1999–2000	4	3ª	5th	
2000–01	4	3ª	18th	
2001–02	5	Reg. Pref.	1st	
2002–03	4	3ª	9th	
2003–04	4	3ª	10th	
2004–05	4	3ª	19th	
2005–06	5	Reg. Pref.	14th	
2006–07	5	Reg. Pref.	6th	
2007–08	5	Reg. Pref.	20th	
2008–09	6	1ª Reg.	5th	
2009–10	6	1ª Reg.	1st	
2010–11	5	Reg. Pref.	13th	
2011–12	5	Reg. Pref.	4th	
2012–13	5	Reg. Pref.	14th	

- 12 seasons in Tercera División
