= CD Santa Ponsa =

Association football club in Spain

Santa Ponsa
- Full name: Club Deportivo Santa Ponsa
- Founded: 1972
- Dissolved: 1990
- Ground: Camp de Futbol Santa Ponça; Santa Ponsa, Mallorca; Balearic Islands, Spain
- 1989–90: 3ª – Group 11, 8th
Home colours

Club Deportivo Santa Ponsa was a Spanish football club based in Santa Ponsa, in the island of Mallorca, in the Balearic Islands. Founded in 1972 and dissolved in 1990, the club played for two seasons in Tercera División and one season in Segunda División B.

== History ==
Founded in 1972, the club achieved four consecutive promotions starting in 1985, moving from the Segunda Regional straight to Segunda División B. After an immediate relegation in the 1988–89 season, the club played a further season in Tercera División before merging with CD Cade Paguera and CD Maganova-Juve to create CF Platges de Calvià.

=== Other related clubs ===
- Club Deportivo Santa Ponsa — (1972–1990)
- Real Club Deportivo Santa Ponsa – (?–2008)
- Santa Ponsa Club de Fútbol – (2011–)
- Sporting Santa Ponsa Talarrubias — (2016–)

== Season to season ==
Season	Tier	Division	Place	Copa del Rey
1982–83	8	3ª Reg.	1st	
1983–84	7	2ª Reg.	2nd	
1984–85	7	2ª Reg.	1st	
1985–86	6	1ª Reg.	2nd	
1986–87	5	Reg. Pref.	2nd	
1987–88	4	3ª	1st	
1988–89	3	2ª B	20th	
1989–90	4	3ª	8th	

- 1 season in Segunda División B
- 2 seasons in Tercera División
