= CF Nules =

Spanish football club

- Full name: Club de Fútbol Nules
- Founded: 19 October 1931; 94 years ago
- Ground: Nou Estadi Noulas; Nules, Province of Castellón, Spain
- Capacity: 3,500
- Chairman: (Spain) Pedro Arámbul Bertomeu
- Manager: (Spain) Basilio López Moner
- League: Primera FFCV – Group 1
- 2024–25: Primera FFCV – Group 1, 6th of 16
- Website: https://www.facebook.com/clubdeFutbolNules
Home colours	Away colours

Club de Fútbol Nules is a Spanish football club based in Nules, Province of Castellón. It was founded on 19 October 1931 and currently plays in the Primera FFCV – Group 1.

== Season to season ==
Season	Tier	Division	Place	Copa del Rey
1929–1934	—	Regional	—	
1934–35	4	1ª Reg.	1st	First round
1935–36	4	1ª Reg.		
1939–40	5	2ª Reg.	1st	
1940–41	4	1ª Reg.	7th	
1941–42	4	1ª Reg.	5th	
1942–43	4	1ª Reg.	7th	
1943–44	3	3ª	5th	
1944–45	4	1ª Reg.	7th	
1945–46	4	1ª Reg.	7th	
1946–1951	DNP			
1951–52	5	2ª Reg.	2nd	
1952–53	5	2ª Reg.	2nd	
1953–54	4	1ª Reg.	10th	
1954–55	4	1ª Reg.	4th	
1955–56	4	1ª Reg.	7th	
1956–57	4	1ª Reg.	9th	
1957–58	4	1ª Reg.	17th	
1958–59	5	2ª Reg.	1st	
1959–60	4	1ª Reg.	15th	

Season	Tier	Division	Place	Copa del Rey
1960–61	4	1ª Reg.	17th	
1961–62	4	1ª Reg.	16th	
1962–63	4	1ª Reg.	13th	
1963–64	4	1ª Reg.	14th	
1964–65	4	1ª Reg.	16th	
1965–66	4	1ª Reg.	6th	
1966–67	4	1ª Reg.	8th	
1967–68	4	1ª Reg.	4th	
1968–69	4	1ª Reg.	10th	
1969–70	4	1ª Reg.	8th	
1970–71	4	Reg. Pref.	7th	
1971–72	4	Reg. Pref.	14th	
1972–73	4	Reg. Pref.	19th	
1973–74	5	1ª Reg.	2nd	
1974–75	4	Reg. Pref.	11th	
1975–76	4	Reg. Pref.	17th	
1976–77	4	Reg. Pref.	16th	
1977–78	5	Reg. Pref.	19th	
1978–79	6	1ª Reg.	16th	
1979–80	6	1ª Reg.	11th	

Season	Tier	Division	Place	Copa del Rey
1980–81	6	1ª Reg.	11th	
1981–82	6	1ª Reg.	12th	
1982–83	6	1ª Reg.	5th	
1983–84	6	1ª Reg.	2nd	
1984–85	5	Reg. Pref.	1st	
1985–86	4	3ª	3rd	
1986–87	4	3ª	9th	First round
1987–88	4	3ª	1st	
1988–89	3	2ª B	20th	
1989–90	4	3ª	8th	
1990–91	4	3ª	18th	
1991–92	5	Reg. Pref.	14th	
1992–93	6	1ª Reg.	4th	
1993–94	6	1ª Reg.	1st	
1994–95	5	Reg. Pref.	2nd	
1995–96	5	Reg. Pref.	13th	
1996–97	5	Reg. Pref.	5th	
1997–98	5	Reg. Pref.	5th	
1998–99	5	Reg. Pref.	7th	
1999–2000	5	Reg. Pref.	18th	

Season	Tier	Division	Place	Copa del Rey
2000–01	6	1ª Reg.	2nd	
2001–02	5	Reg. Pref.	14th	
2002–03	5	Reg. Pref.	14th	
2003–04	5	Reg. Pref.	11th	
2004–05	5	Reg. Pref.	15th	
2005–06	5	Reg. Pref.	17th	
2006–07	6	1ª Reg.	1st	
2007–08	5	Reg. Pref.	5th	
2008–09	5	Reg. Pref.	12th	
2009–10	5	Reg. Pref.	6th	
2010–11	5	Reg. Pref.	11th	
2011–12	5	Reg. Pref.	5th	
2012–13	5	Reg. Pref.	11th	
2013–14	5	Reg. Pref.	13th	
2014–15	5	Reg. Pref.	16th	
2015–16	6	1ª Reg.	1st	
2016–17	5	Reg. Pref.	15th	
2017–18	5	Reg. Pref.	14th	
2018–19	5	Reg. Pref.	5th	
2019–20	5	Reg. Pref.	17th	

Season	Tier	Division	Place	Copa del Rey
2020–21	5	Reg. Pref.	12th	
2021–22	7	1ª Reg.	7th	
2022–23	7	1ª Reg.	2nd	
2023–24	7	1ª FFCV	11th	
2024–25	7	1ª FFCV	6th	
2025–26	7	1ª FFCV	2nd	
2026–27	7	1ª FFCV		

- 2 seasons in Segunda División B
- 7 seasons in Tercera División

== Current squad ==
Note: Flags indicate national team as defined under FIFA eligibility rules; some limited exceptions apply. Players may hold more than one non-FIFA nationality.

No.	Pos.	Nation	Player
—	GK	ESP	Fernando Herrero
—	GK	ESP	Pablo Carrillo
—	DF	ESP	Alex Izquierdo
—	DF	ESP	Borja Mocholí
—	DF	ESP	Abel García
—	DF	ESP	Aitor Sebastián
—	DF	ESP	David Sabater
—	DF	ARG	Nicolás Ramírez
—	MF	ESP	José Meseguer
—	MF	ESP	Cristian Fandos
—	MF	ESP	Agustín Palmer

No.	Pos.	Nation	Player
—	MF	ESP	Sergio de la Fuente
—	MF	ESP	Luis Ripollés
—	MF	ESP	Rubén Martínez
—	MF	ESP	Albert Marco
—	MF	ESP	Ferrán Marco
—	MF	ESP	Pablo Soriano
—	FW	ESP	David Barreda
—	FW	ESP	Iván Fandos
—	FW	ESP	Víctor Sapiña
—	FW	ESP	Héctor Romay
