= 1988–89 Segunda División B =

Season of third division football in Spain

Segunda División B
- Season: 1988–89
- Champions: Atlético Madrileño; Bilbao Athletic; Levante; Palamós
- Promoted: Atlético Madrileño; Bilbao Athletic; Levante; Palamós
- Relegated: Algeciras; Arenteiro; Arnedo; Barcelona Aficionados; Bergantiños; Betis Deportivo; Don Benito; Gimnástica Medinense; Lorca; Nules; Oviedo Aficionados; Plasencia; Poblense; Polideportivo Almería; Santa Ponsa; Santoña; Serverense; San Sebastián de los Reyes; Terrassa
- Matches: 1,520
- Goals: 3,486 (2.29 per match)
- Top goalscorer: Juan Carlos de Diego (33 goals)
- Best goalkeeper: Manolo López (0.46 goals/match)
- Biggest home win: Atlético Baleares 8–0 Santa Ponsa (10 September 1988); Villarreal 8–0 Nules (25 March 1989); Barcelona Aficionados 8–0 Santa Ponsa (4 June 1989)
- Biggest away win: Bergantiños 0–5 Lugo (18 December 1988)
- Highest scoring: Levante 5–4 Ceuta (12 February 1989)
- Longest winning run: 7 matches Barakaldo; FC Andorra; Leganés
- Longest unbeaten run: 31 matches Palamós
- Longest winless run: 19 matches Santa Ponsa
- Longest losing run: 9 matches Terrassa

The 1988–89 Segunda División B season was the 12th since its establishment. The first matches of the season were played on 3 September 1988, and the season ended on 25 June 1989.

The division was divided into four geographic groups. The group champions were Athletic Bilbao B in Group 1, Palamós CF in Group 2, Atlético Madrileño (Atlético Madrid's reserve team) in Group 3, and Levante UD in Group 4.

== Overview before the season ==
80 teams joined the league, including four relegated from the 1987–88 Segunda División and 17 promoted from the 1987–88 Tercera División. The composition of the groups was determined by the Royal Spanish Football Federation, attending to geographical criteria.

Relegated from Segunda División

- Bilbao Athletic
- Hércules
- Granada
- Cartagena

Promoted from Tercera División

- Racing Ferrol
- Oviedo Aficionados
- Santoña
- Barakaldo
- Palamós
- Nules
- Pegaso
- Gimnástica Medinense
- Jaén
- Algeciras
- Santa Ponsa
- Marino
- Torrevieja
- Don Benito
- Calahorra
- Binéfar
- Tomelloso

== Group 1 ==
Teams from Asturias, Basque Country, Cantabria, Castile and Leon and Galicia.

=== Teams ===
Location of teams in Segunda División B Gr. 1 1988–89

Team	Founded	Home city	Stadium
Arenteiro	1958	O Carballiño, Galicia	Espiñedo
Arosa	1945	Vilagarcía de Arousa, Galicia	A Lomba
As Pontes	1960	As Pontes, Galicia	O Poboado
Real Avilés	1903	Avilés, Asturias	Román Suárez Puerta
Barakaldo	1917	Barakaldo, Basque Country	Lasesarre
Basconia	1913	Basauri, Basque Country	Basozelai
Bergantiños	1923	Carballo, Galicia	As Eiroas
Bilbao Athletic	1964	Bilbao, Basque Country	San Mamés
Cultural Leonesa	1923	León, Castile and Leon	Antonio Amilvia
Durango	1919	Durango, Basque Country	Tabira
Lalín	1974	Lalín, Galicia	Manuel Anxo Cortizo
Langreo	1961	Langreo, Asturias	Ganzábal
Lemona	1923	Lemoa, Basque Country	Arlonagusia
Lugo	1953	Lugo, Galicia	Anxo Carro
Orense	1952	Ourense, Galicia	O Couto
Oviedo Aficionados	1940	Oviedo, Asturias	Carlos Tartiere
Ponferradina	1922	Ponferrada, Castile and Leon	Fuentesnuevas
Pontevedra	1941	Pontevedra, Galicia	Pasarón
Racing de Ferrol	1919	Ferrol, Galicia	Manuel Rivera
Santoña	1917	Santoña, Cantabria	El Palomar

=== League table ===
Pos	Team	Pld	W	D	L	GF	GA	GD	Pts	Qualification or relegation
1	Bilbao Athletic	38	26	7	5	74	37	+37	59	Promotion to Segunda División
2	Barakaldo	38	21	9	8	56	32	+24	51 (Note: Barakaldo finished ahead of Ourense on head-to-head points: Barakaldo–Ourense 1–0, Ourense–Barakaldo 1–1)	
3	Ourense	38	18	15	5	50	23	+27	51	
4	Avilés	38	17	16	5	48	25	+23	50	
5	Lugo	38	18	11	9	49	20	+29	47	
6	Pontevedra	38	15	13	10	45	34	+11	43 (Note: Pontevedra finished ahead of As Pontes on head-to-head points: Pontevedra–As Pontes 5–1, As Pontes–Pontevedra 3–3)	
7	As Pontes	38	17	9	12	54	46	+8	43	
8	Cultural Leonesa	38	16	9	13	44	37	+7	41	
9	Arosa	38	15	10	13	41	33	+8	40	
10	Ponferradina	38	14	8	16	42	44	−2	36	
11	Langreo	38	10	14	14	43	49	−6	34 (Note: Langreo finished ahead of Lalín, Racing Ferrol and Baskonia on head-to-head points: Langreo 7 pts, Lalín 7 pts, Racing Ferrol 6 pts, Baskonia 4 pts. Langreo finished ahead of Lalín on head-to-head points: Lalín–Langreo 0–1, Langreo–Lalín 1–1)	
12	Lalín	38	12	10	16	28	39	−11	34	
13	Racing Ferrol	38	11	12	15	32	38	−6	34	
14	Baskonia	38	9	16	13	36	48	−12	34	
15	Lemona	38	9	15	14	29	33	−4	33 (Note: Lemona finished ahead of Durango on head-to-head goal difference: Lemona–Durango 2–0, Durango–Lemona 1–0)	
16	Cultural Durango	38	10	13	15	29	40	−11	33	
17	Arenteiro	38	10	6	22	26	53	−27	26	Relegation to Tercera División
18	Santoña	38	7	11	20	19	49	−30	25	Relegation to Tercera División
19	Oviedo Aficionados	38	7	10	21	31	68	−37	24	Relegation to Tercera División
20	Bergantiños	38	6	10	22	31	59	−28	22	Relegation to Tercera División

Source: BDFútbol
Rules for classification: 1) points; 2) head-to-head points; 3) head-to-head goal difference; 4) goal difference; 5) number of goals scored

=== Results ===
Home \ Away	ARE	ARO	ASP	AVI	BAR	BAS	BER	BIL	CUL	DUR	LAL	LAN	LEM	LUG	ORE	OVI	PNF	PNT	RFE	SNT
Arenteiro	—	0–1	0–1	0–1	0–2	1–0	2–0	2–3	0–2	1–0	3–0	1–0	1–0	1–0	1–1	1–0	1–3	1–0	0–0	2–0
Arosa	5–2	—	0–1	2–1	1–0	3–0	1–0	0–0	4–1	3–1	0–1	1–2	2–1	2–1	1–1	3–0	0–1	0–1	1–1	0–1
As Pontes	2–0	1–1	—	2–2	4–1	2–1	6–0	1–3	2–1	1–1	2–0	1–0	2–0	0–0	0–0	6–1	2–1	3–3	1–2	2–1
Real Avilés Ind.	2–0	0–0	1–0	—	2–2	1–1	2–1	0–1	1–0	3–0	0–0	0–0	0–0	2–0	0–0	2–2	2–0	1–0	6–1	0–0
Barakaldo	4–0	0–0	2–1	1–1	—	0–1	3–1	1–2	0–2	1–0	1–0	2–1	2–0	3–0	1–0	3–1	2–0	1–2	1–0	1–0
Basconia	1–1	2–1	1–1	3–0	0–1	—	1–1	1–2	0–0	1–1	1–2	2–2	1–1	0–4	1–1	2–1	2–1	0–3	1–3	2–0
Bergantiños	2–0	2–0	0–1	0–2	0–1	1–1	—	1–2	2–1	0–1	2–3	5–3	0–0	0–5	1–3	2–2	1–2	1–2	0–1	0–0
Bilbao Athletic	5–0	2–1	2–0	1–3	2–2	5–2	3–1	—	4–0	1–0	2–0	1–1	1–1	1–0	1–1	2–0	3–2	4–1	3–0	2–0
Cultural Leonesa	1–0	3–1	3–0	0–1	2–0	2–2	0–2	1–1	—	0–0	2–0	1–1	1–0	1–1	1–2	4–0	2–0	1–0	0–0	1–1
Durango	1–1	1–0	1–2	0–2	2–2	0–0	1–0	1–2	2–0	—	3–1	0–2	1–0	0–1	1–0	1–1	2–2	0–0	1–0	2–1
Lalín	2–0	0–1	1–2	0–0	0–1	1–0	0–0	1–2	0–1	1–0	—	0–1	1–1	1–0	1–0	2–1	0–0	2–1	1–1	1–0
Langreo	2–0	1–1	2–1	0–0	2–3	1–1	3–1	1–2	1–2	4–1	1–1	—	1–0	0–0	0–1	0–0	0–0	2–2	2–1	1–3
Lemona	2–1	0–0	0–0	0–0	0–2	1–1	2–1	3–1	0–1	2–0	3–0	1–1	—	0–0	1–1	3–2	2–1	0–0	3–0	1–0
Lugo	0–0	2–1	4–0	0–0	1–0	2–0	0–0	3–0	1–0	0–3	1–1	4–0	2–1	—	1–0	0–0	2–0	0–0	1–0	5–0
Orense	2–0	2–0	1–0	2–2	1–1	1–1	1–0	3–0	2–0	1–0	2–1	2–0	0–0	1–2	—	1–0	3–0	2–0	0–0	4–1
Oviedo Aficionados	1–0	1–2	1–3	0–5	0–4	1–0	0–0	1–4	0–1	0–0	1–0	3–2	0–0	0–4	1–1	—	2–0	0–2	3–2	3–0
Ponferradina	3–2	0–1	2–0	3–0	1–1	0–1	1–1	0–1	0–3	3–0	1–1	2–0	1–0	1–0	1–4	3–1	—	2–0	1–0	0–0
Pontevedra	2–1	0–1	5–1	1–2	1–1	0–0	2–0	1–1	2–2	1–1	2–1	0–0	2–0	1–0	0–0	1–0	1–0	—	2–0	4–0
Racing Ferrol	2–0	0–0	2–0	2–0	1–1	0–1	0–1	0–2	2–0	0–0	0–0	2–0	2–0	0–2	2–2	0–0	0–0	3–0	—	1–0
Santoña	0–0	0–0	0–0	0–1	0–2	0–1	1–1	1–0	2–1	0–0	0–1	1–3	1–0	0–0	0–1	2–1	1–4	0–0	2–1	—

Source: BDFútbol
Legend: Blue = home team win; Yellow = draw; Red = away team win.

=== Top goalscorers ===
Goalscorers	Goals	Team
(Spain) José Luis Astiazaran	22	Barakaldo
(Spain) José Ángel Uribarrena	20	Bilbao Athletic
(Spain) Moska	17	Bilbao Athletic
(Spain) Herrera	14	Cultural Leonesa
(Spain) Rui Wamba	14	Baskonia

=== Top goalkeepers ===
Goalkeeper	Goals	Matches	Average	Team
(Spain) Pachu	16	30	0.53	Avilés
(Spain) José Domínguez	20	36	0.56	Lugo
(Spain) Fermín Hortas	22	36	0.61	Ourense
(Spain) Manuel Espinosa	22	30	0.73	Pontevedra
(Spain) Eugenio Lozano	23	28	0.82	Lemona

== Group 2 ==
Teams from Andorra, Aragon, Basque Country, Balearic Islands, Catalonia, La Rioja and Navarre.

=== Teams ===
Location of teams in Segunda División B Gr. 2 1988–89

Team	Founded	Home city	Stadium
Andorra CF	1957	Andorra, Aragon	Juan Antonio Endeiza
FC Andorra	1942	Andorra la Vella, Andorra	Comunal
Arnedo	1949	Arnedo, La Rioja	Sendero
Atlético Baleares	1942	Palma de Mallorca, Balearic Islands	Balear
Barcelona Aficionados	1967	Barcelona, Catalonia	Mini Estadi
Binéfar	1922	Binéfar, Aragon	El Segalar
Calahorra	1923	Calahorra, La Rioja	La Planilla
Cala Millor	1933	Cala Millor, Balearic Islands	Badía Cala Millor
Deportivo Aragón	1958	Zaragoza, Aragon	Ciudad Deportiva del Real Zaragoza
Fraga	1947	Fraga, Aragon	La Estacada
Gimnàstic de Tarragona	1886	Tarragona, Catalonia	Nou Estadi
Hospitalet	1957	L'Hospitalet de Llobregat, Catalonia	Municipal de Deportes
Sporting Mahonés	1974	Mahón, Balearic Islands	Bintaufa
Osasuna Promesas	1962	Aranguren, Navarre	Tajonar
Palamós	1898	Palamós, Catalonia	Carrer de Cervantes
Poblense	1935	Sa Pobla, Balearic Islands	Nou Camp Sa Pobla
San Sebastián	1951	San Sebastián, Basque Country	Atotxa
Santa Ponsa	1972	Santa Ponsa, Balearic Islands	Municipal
Terrassa	1906	Terrassa, Catalonia	Olímpic de Terrassa
Teruel	1954	Teruel, Aragon	Pinilla

=== League table ===
Pos	Team	Pld	W	D	L	GF	GA	GD	Pts	Qualification or relegation
1	Palamós	38	23	13	2	70	30	+40	59	Promotion to Segunda División
2	FC Andorra	38	23	8	7	59	28	+31	54	
3	San Sebastián	38	20	6	12	57	34	+23	46	
4	Teruel	38	17	11	10	43	35	+8	45 (Note: Teruel finished ahead of Sporting Mahonés and Atlético Baleares on head-to-head points: Teruel 5 pts, Sporting Mahonés 4 pts, Atlético Baleares 3 pts)	
5	Sporting Mahonés	38	18	9	11	49	34	+15	45	
6	Atlético Baleares	38	15	15	8	54	40	+14	45	
7	Osasuna Promesas	38	15	12	11	59	46	+13	42	
8	Binéfar	38	15	10	13	57	50	+7	40 (Note: Binéfar finished ahead of Gimnàstic on head-to-head points: Gimnàstic–Binéfar 0–0, Binéfar–Gimnàstic 6–2)	
9	Gimnàstic	38	13	14	11	54	44	+10	40	
10	L'Hospitalet	38	15	8	15	57	44	+13	38	
11	Barcelona Aficionados (Note: Barcelona Aficionados was relegated to Terceara División after Barcelona Atlètic relegation from Segunda División)	38	16	5	17	64	58	+6	37	Relegation to Tercera División
12	Andorra	38	11	14	13	41	54	−13	36	
13	Calahorra	38	13	9	16	44	48	−4	35	
14	Fraga	38	12	10	16	41	54	−13	34	
15	Cala Millor (Note: Cala Millor was relegated to Tercera División due to financial problems)	38	12	9	17	49	56	−7	33	Relegation to Tercera División
16	Deportivo Aragón	38	10	12	16	38	41	−3	32 (Note: Deportivo Aragón finished ahead of Arnedo on overall goal difference)	
17	Arnedo	38	11	10	17	43	56	−13	32	Relegation to Tercera División
18	Poblense	38	9	8	21	28	56	−28	26 (Note: Poblense finished ahead of Terrassa on head-to-head points: Terrassa–Poblense 1–1, Poblense–Terrassa 2–0)	Relegation to Tercera División
19	Terrassa	38	10	6	22	37	68	−31	26	Relegation to Tercera División
20	Santa Ponsa	38	2	11	25	24	92	−68	15	Relegation to Tercera División

Source: BDFútbol
Rules for classification: 1) points; 2) head-to-head points; 3) head-to-head goal difference; 4) goal difference; 5) number of goals scored

=== Results ===
Home \ Away	AND	FCA	ARN	BAL	BAR	BIN	CAL	CAM	DAR	FRA	GIM	HOS	MAH	OSA	PAL	POB	SSE	SPN	TRR	TER
Andorra CF	—	2–2	2–1	1–1	2–0	3–0	0–1	1–0	0–0	1–1	3–2	1–2	1–0	3–2	3–3	2–3	3–2	2–2	3–1	0–0
FC Andorra	2–1	—	0–1	1–2	2–3	3–0	3–1	2–0	1–0	2–0	1–0	1–0	0–0	1–1	2–0	1–0	1–0	5–0	3–1	2–0
Arnedo	1–1	0–2	—	1–1	1–2	5–3	1–1	1–1	0–1	1–0	1–1	1–1	0–1	3–0	1–1	2–0	0–2	4–0	0–1	1–2
Atlético Baleares	3–1	0–0	2–0	—	3–0	3–1	2–0	2–2	1–1	3–1	1–1	1–0	1–1	2–1	2–1	1–0	1–1	8–0	1–3	0–0
Barcelona Afic.	5–0	0–2	2–0	0–1	—	3–1	0–2	2–1	1–0	3–0	3–1	0–2	1–0	4–2	3–4	2–1	1–2	8–0	0–0	1–1
Binéfar	0–0	1–3	2–1	2–0	0–2	—	2–0	3–2	2–0	1–1	6–2	0–1	2–1	0–2	1–1	5–0	0–1	6–0	0–0	1–0
Calahorra	3–0	1–1	1–4	0–0	0–2	1–1	—	4–1	4–1	2–1	0–3	1–0	2–1	0–0	1–2	1–0	1–2	2–1	6–2	1–3
Cala Millor	3–0	1–3	5–0	0–0	4–1	3–0	1–1	—	1–1	2–1	0–0	0–0	1–0	2–1	1–2	3–0	3–0	2–2	2–0	0–1
Deportivo Aragón	0–1	0–1	1–2	0–1	3–0	3–3	0–1	1–1	—	2–0	1–1	1–2	1–1	2–2	0–0	3–1	0–1	4–0	2–0	3–0
Fraga	1–1	2–0	2–1	1–1	2–2	1–2	1–0	2–1	2–1	—	0–0	2–1	1–1	2–0	0–2	2–1	0–0	5–0	2–2	2–0
Gimnàstic	1–1	1–0	2–2	2–1	3–1	0–0	0–0	4–2	0–1	6–0	—	1–4	0–0	1–1	0–1	2–1	1–2	2–1	4–1	0–1
Hospitalet	0–0	1–2	5–0	3–0	3–0	0–3	2–0	1–0	4–0	2–1	0–2	—	1–1	2–3	2–2	1–1	2–2	4–2	4–1	1–2
Sporting Mahonés	4–0	2–1	0–1	1–1	1–1	1–0	1–0	2–0	2–1	0–2	1–1	1–0	—	4–2	1–2	2–0	1–0	5–1	2–1	1–0
Osasuna Prom.	3–0	2–3	2–0	2–0	3–2	3–1	0–0	4–0	2–0	6–0	1–3	2–1	2–1	—	0–0	2–1	1–0	0–0	1–1	1–1
Palamós	1–0	1–1	4–0	2–0	2–1	1–1	3–1	4–0	1–1	2–1	0–0	2–0	3–0	2–2	—	3–1	1–0	4–0	1–0	2–0
Poblense	2–0	0–2	0–1	1–1	2–1	1–1	0–2	0–2	0–0	0–0	1–3	2–0	1–3	1–0	0–0	—	1–0	1–0	2–0	0–0
San Sebastián	2–1	1–1	2–1	4–0	2–1	0–0	2–1	5–0	0–1	2–1	2–1	3–1	1–2	0–0	0–2	5–0	—	3–0	5–0	0–2
Santa Ponsa	0–0	1–1	2–2	1–1	0–4	1–2	2–1	0–1	0–1	0–1	1–2	0–0	0–1	2–2	2–2	0–1	0–1	—	2–1	0–0
Terrassa	0–1	0–1	0–1	2–6	1–1	0–1	2–0	4–1	1–0	1–0	2–1	0–2	1–3	0–1	1–2	1–1	1–0	2–1	—	3–0
Teruel	0–0	2–0	1–1	2–0	4–1	1–3	1–1	1–0	1–1	2–0	0–0	3–2	1–0	1–0	1–4	2–1	1–2	1–0	5–0	—

Source: BDFútbol
Legend: Blue = home team win; Yellow = draw; Red = away team win.

=== Top goalscorers ===
Goalscorers	Goals	Team
(Spain) Salvador Cardona	25	Palamós
(Spain) Manuel Escribano	16	Gimnàstic
(Spain) Rafael Sanz	15	Sporting Mahonés
(Spain) Javier Artabe	15	Atlético Baleares
(Spain) Gabriel Ramón	15	Atlético Baleares

=== Top goalkeepers ===
Goalkeeper	Goals	Matches	Average	Team
(Spain) Francesc Boix	24	34	0.71	Palamós
(Spain) José Antonio Arévalo	28	38	0.74	FC Andorra
(Spain) Patxi Hernández	26	30	0.87	San Sebastián
(Spain) Enrique Ciaurriz	34	38	0.89	Sporting Mahonés
(Spain) José Pérez	31	33	0.94	Teruel

== Group 3 ==
Teams from Andalusia, Canary Islands, Castile and Leon, Castilla–La Mancha, Extremadura and Madrid.

=== Teams ===
Location of teams in Segunda División B Gr. 3 1988–89
Canary Islands

Team	Founded	Home city	Stadium
Alcalá	1923	Alcalá de Henares, Madrid	El Val
Atlético Madrileño	1969	Madrid, Madrid	Vicente Calderón
Real Ávila	1923	Ávila, Castile and Leon	Adolfo Suárez
Badajoz	1905	Badajoz, Extremadura	Vivero
Betis Deportivo	1962	Seville, Andalusia	Benito Villamarín
Córdoba	1954	Córdoba, Andalusia	El Arcángel
Don Benito	1928	Don Benito, Extremadura	Vicente Sanz
Getafe	1983	Getafe, Madrid	Las Margaritas
Gimnástica Medinense	1962	Medina del Campo, Castile and Leon	Acción Católica
Real Jaén	1929	Jaén, Andalusia	La Victoria
Leganés	1928	Leganés, Madrid	Luis Rodríguez de Miguel
Linares	1961	Linares, Andalusia	Linarejos
Marino	1936	Playa de las Américas, Canary Islands	Antonio Domínguez Alfonso
Maspalomas	1969	San Bartolomé de Tirajana, Canary Islands	Ciudad Deportiva Maspalomas
Pegaso	1962	Tres Cantos, Madrid	La Foresta
Plasencia	1941	Plasencia, Extremadura	Ciudad Deportiva
San Sebastián de los Reyes	1971	San Sebastián de los Reyes, Madrid	Matapiñonera
Sevilla Atlético	1950	Seville, Andalusia	Viejo Nervión
Telde	1965	Telde, Canary Islands	El Hornillo
Tomelloso	1979	Tomelloso, Castilla–La Mancha	Municipal

=== League table ===
Pos	Team	Pld	W	D	L	GF	GA	GD	Pts	Qualification or relegation
1	Atlético Madrileño	38	21	10	7	78	40	+38	52	Promotion to Segunda División
2	Sevilla Atlético	38	20	11	7	53	31	+22	51 (Note: Sevilla Atlético finished ahead of Linares on overall goal difference)	
3	Linares	38	18	15	5	46	25	+21	51	
4	Badajoz	38	21	7	10	60	33	+27	49	
5	Tomelloso	38	18	10	10	53	36	+17	46	
6	Getafe	38	16	11	11	52	36	+16	43	
7	Alcalá	38	13	15	10	42	45	−3	41	
8	Leganés	38	13	13	12	36	37	−1	39	
9	Pegaso	38	15	8	15	47	49	−2	38	
10	Marino	38	15	7	16	44	45	−1	37 (Note: Marino finished ahead of Jaén on overall goal difference)	
11	Jaén	38	13	11	14	43	48	−5	37	
12	Ávila	38	12	11	15	39	42	−3	35 (Note: Ávila finished ahead of Córdoba on number of goals scored)	
13	Córdoba	38	13	9	16	36	39	−3	35	
14	Maspalomas	38	10	14	14	39	47	−8	34	
15	Telde	38	10	12	16	51	55	−4	32 (Note: Telde finished ahead of San Sebastián de los Reyes and Plasencia on head-to-head points: Telde 5 pts, San Sebastián de los Reyes 5 pts, Plasencia 2 pts. Telde finished ahead of San Sebastián de los Reyes on head-to-head points: Telde–San Sebastián de los Reyes 3–1, San Sebastián de los Reyes–Telde 0–0)	
16	San Sebastián de los Reyes	38	10	12	16	28	43	−15	32	Relegation to Tercera División
17	Plasencia	38	7	18	13	28	32	−4	32	Relegation to Tercera División
18	Betis Deportivo	38	9	11	18	54	67	−13	29	Relegation to Tercera División
19	Don Benito	38	9	10	19	30	59	−29	28	Relegation to Tercera División
20	Gimnástica Medinense	38	5	9	24	29	79	−50	19	Relegation to Tercera División

Source: BDFútbol
Rules for classification: 1) points; 2) head-to-head points; 3) head-to-head goal difference; 4) goal difference; 5) number of goals scored

=== Results ===
Home \ Away	ALC	ATM	AVI	BAD	BET	COR	DBE	GET	GME	JAE	LEG	LIN	MAR	MAS	PEG	PLA	SSR	SAT	TEL	TOM
Alcalá	—	1–0	3–2	1–2	2–2	0–0	1–1	0–4	2–0	0–1	0–1	1–1	2–1	1–0	3–0	1–1	0–0	0–0	2–1	2–0
At. Madrileño	1–1	—	4–0	1–3	3–3	2–1	3–1	3–2	8–1	4–1	1–1	2–0	2–1	6–1	1–1	2–0	2–0	0–0	3–2	0–0
Real Ávila	0–0	1–2	—	1–0	0–2	2–1	1–0	1–3	1–0	2–1	2–1	0–1	5–1	2–0	0–1	1–1	0–0	1–0	2–0	1–1
Badajoz	4–0	3–2	1–1	—	1–1	1–0	1–0	2–0	6–0	3–0	0–1	2–2	2–0	1–1	1–0	0–0	1–0	0–1	5–3	2–0
Betis Deportivo	3–1	2–1	0–2	1–2	—	3–1	1–2	0–2	3–0	0–2	1–1	2–2	1–3	3–1	0–3	1–0	1–1	0–1	1–2	0–0
Córdoba	1–0	1–3	1–0	1–2	1–1	—	2–1	0–0	2–1	0–0	0–1	0–0	2–1	3–1	0–1	2–0	5–1	1–2	1–0	2–1
Don Benito	2–2	1–0	2–2	1–0	0–4	1–2	—	0–1	3–2	0–0	1–1	2–0	1–4	1–1	1–1	0–2	0–0	2–1	1–0	1–3
Getafe	5–1	0–2	1–0	0–2	3–3	0–0	2–0	—	4–2	0–0	0–0	0–2	3–0	0–0	4–3	2–0	1–0	0–0	3–0	0–2
Gimnástica Medinense	1–2	0–4	1–4	0–3	2–2	1–0	3–1	0–0	—	1–1	1–3	0–0	2–1	1–2	0–3	0–0	1–1	0–2	2–1	1–0
Jaén	2–2	1–2	0–0	3–0	1–3	2–1	2–0	3–1	2–1	—	0–0	1–2	2–1	1–1	1–2	0–3	2–1	2–0	1–0	1–1
Leganés	1–1	1–1	2–0	0–0	3–2	1–1	1–0	2–1	2–0	1–0	—	0–0	0–0	1–1	0–1	1–0	3–0	3–0	0–2	1–2
Linares	0–0	1–0	2–1	0–1	1–1	1–0	4–0	1–0	3–1	1–0	2–0	—	2–0	2–0	3–1	1–0	0–0	2–2	2–0	2–1
Marino	1–2	1–1	1–0	2–1	1–0	0–0	0–1	1–0	0–0	1–0	4–0	2–0	—	1–0	3–0	2–1	0–0	1–0	2–0	1–2
Maspalomas	1–2	1–2	3–1	1–0	5–1	2–0	0–0	1–3	0–0	4–2	1–0	1–1	1–1	—	2–0	0–0	0–0	3–1	0–0	0–0
Pegaso	0–0	0–2	1–0	2–0	3–2	3–1	2–0	1–1	1–1	0–3	2–0	1–1	5–2	1–0	—	0–0	1–2	0–2	1–1	2–3
Plasencia	0–1	0–0	1–1	1–2	3–2	2–0	2–1	0–0	0–0	2–2	0–0	1–1	1–1	2–0	1–0	—	0–1	1–2	0–0	0–0
San Sebast. Reyes	1–2	0–2	0–0	0–0	1–0	0–1	1–2	0–2	2–0	0–1	3–2	0–0	1–0	1–0	2–1	2–1	—	1–3	0–0	4–2
Sevilla Atlético	2–1	4–2	2–0	2–1	2–0	2–0	0–0	1–1	2–1	4–1	3–1	0–0	1–0	4–1	2–3	0–0	2–0	—	0–0	3–2
Telde	2–2	2–2	0–0	2–5	6–1	0–2	5–0	0–3	4–2	1–1	2–0	1–3	3–2	1–1	3–0	1–1	3–1	0–0	—	3–1
Tomelloso	1–0	1–2	2–2	2–0	2–1	0–0	2–0	3–0	4–0	3–0	2–0	1–0	1–1	1–2	1–0	2–1	2–1	0–0	2–0	—

Source: BDFútbol
Legend: Blue = home team win; Yellow = draw; Red = away team win.

=== Top goalscorers ===
Goalscorers	Goals	Team
(Spain) Juan Carlos de Diego	33	Atlético Madrileño
(Spain) Juan Sabas	21	Pegaso
(Spain) Julio Suárez	20	Marino
(Spain) Manuel Blázquez	16	Badajoz
(Spain) Manuel Toledano	14	Linares

=== Top goalkeepers ===
Goalkeeper	Goals	Matches	Average	Team
(Spain) Peio Aguirreoa	22	37	0.59	Linares
(Spain) José Ángel del Cerro	23	33	0.7	Plasencia
(Spain) Alex Pinilla	27	34	0.79	Sevilla Atlético
(Spain) Diego Díaz	29	30	0.97	Atlético Madrileño
(Spain) Pedro Clavijo	31	32	0.97	Badajoz

== Group 4 ==
Teams from Andalusia, Castilla–La Mancha, Ceuta, Melilla, Region of Murcia and Valencian Community.

=== Teams ===
Location of teams in Segunda División B Gr. 4 1988–89

Team	Founded	Home city	Stadium
Albacete	1940	Albacete, Castilla–La Mancha	Carlos Belmonte
Alcoyano	1928	Alcoy, Valencian Community	El Collao
Algeciras	1909	Algeciras, Andalusia	El Mirador
Polideportivo Almería	1983	Almería, Andalusia	Municipal
Cartagena FC	1940	Cartagena, Region of Murcia	Cartagonova
Ceuta	1970	Ceuta	Alfonso Murube
Eldense	1921	Elda, Valencian Community	Pepico Amat
Gandía	1947	Gandia, Valencian Community	Guillermo Olagüe
Granada	1931	Granada, Andalusia	Los Cármenes
Hércules	1922	Alicante, Valencian Community	José Rico Pérez
Levante	1909	Valencia, Valencian Community	Nou Estadi Llevant
Linense	1912	La Línea de la Concepción, Andalusia	Municipal La Línea de la Concepción
Lorca	1969	Lorca, Region of Murcia	San José
Marbella	1947	Marbella, Andalusia	Municipal de Marbella
Melilla	1976	Melilla	Álvarez Claro
Nules	1931	Nules, Valencian Community	Noulas
Olímpic de Xàtiva	1932	Xàtiva, Valencian Community	La Murta
Atlético Sanluqueño	1948	Sanlúcar de Barrameda, Andalusia	El Palmar
Torrevieja	1971	Torrevieja, Valencian Community	Vicente García
Villarreal	1923	Villarreal, Valencian Community	El Madrigal

=== League table ===
Pos	Team	Pld	W	D	L	GF	GA	GD	Pts	Qualification or relegation
1	Levante	38	25	9	4	66	29	+37	59	Promotion to Segunda División
2	Ceuta	38	15	18	5	44	23	+21	48	
3	Atlético Sanluqueño	38	17	13	8	47	27	+20	47	
4	Villarreal	38	15	15	8	53	34	+19	45	
5	Eldense	38	15	14	9	37	32	+5	44	
6	Marbella	38	15	13	10	46	32	+14	43	
7	Cartagena	38	16	9	13	39	29	+10	41	
8	Hércules	38	14	12	12	49	47	+2	40	
9	Alcoyano	38	15	9	14	48	44	+4	39 (Note: Alcoyano finished ahead of Olímpic on head-to-head goal difference: Olímpic–Alcoyano 2–0, Alcoyano–Olímpic 3–0)	
10	Olímpic	38	13	13	12	41	41	0	39	
11	Gandía	38	12	14	12	32	30	+2	38	
12	Albacete	38	11	14	13	46	45	+1	36	
13	Torrevieja	38	12	11	15	45	52	−7	35 (Note: Torrevieja finished ahead of Linense and Melilla on head-to-head points: Torrevieja 6 pts, Linense 4 pts, Melilla 2 pts)	
14	Linense	38	10	15	13	36	41	−5	35	
15	Melilla	38	13	9	16	37	49	−12	35	
16	Granada	38	10	12	16	40	47	−7	32	
17	Polideportivo Almería	38	11	6	21	37	59	−22	28	Relegation to Tercera División
18	Algeciras	38	6	15	17	28	43	−15	27	Relegation to Tercera División
19	Lorca	38	8	10	20	20	53	−33	26	Relegation to Tercera División
20	Nules	38	7	9	22	32	66	−34	23	Relegation to Tercera División

Source: BDFútbol
Rules for classification: 1) points; 2) head-to-head points; 3) head-to-head goal difference; 4) goal difference; 5) number of goals scored

=== Results ===
Home \ Away	ALB	ALC	ALG	ALM	CAR	CEU	ELD	GAN	GRA	HER	LEV	LNS	LOR	MAB	MEL	NUL	OLI	SLU	TRV	VIL
Albacete	—	1–3	2–1	3–1	0–1	0–0	1–1	0–0	2–1	3–3	2–1	3–0	2–0	1–2	2–0	2–1	3–0	0–0	2–2	1–2
Alcoyano	1–1	—	2–1	2–1	1–0	0–0	3–0	1–0	1–1	2–2	1–2	2–1	0–1	2–1	3–0	4–2	3–0	0–1	2–1	1–1
Algeciras	0–0	0–1	—	3–0	0–0	1–1	0–1	0–1	0–0	0–1	1–1	3–2	0–1	1–1	2–2	4–3	2–1	0–0	0–1	2–2
Poli Almería	2–0	3–2	0–2	—	1–2	1–2	3–2	4–1	1–0	1–0	1–2	2–1	1–0	1–1	0–1	0–0	3–2	0–1	3–2	0–2
Cartagena FC	0–0	1–2	3–0	4–1	—	0–1	0–1	0–4	0–1	1–0	1–1	2–1	3–0	1–0	0–0	4–1	2–0	2–0	1–0	0–1
Ceuta	3–0	1–0	1–0	1–0	0–0	—	0–1	0–0	2–0	1–0	0–0	2–2	3–0	0–0	0–0	2–1	2–0	3–0	5–2	1–1
Eldense	1–0	2–0	1–0	1–1	1–1	0–0	—	1–0	2–0	2–0	0–0	2–1	1–1	1–0	3–0	2–0	0–0	0–2	1–1	1–0
Gandía	1–1	1–1	2–0	3–0	0–1	0–0	0–0	—	0–1	1–3	0–1	1–0	0–0	0–3	1–2	1–0	0–0	2–1	1–0	0–0
Granada	2–1	0–0	0–0	2–0	2–0	0–1	2–2	0–1	—	1–1	0–1	0–0	4–0	0–2	2–1	1–1	3–5	0–1	2–2	2–0
Hércules	1–1	2–2	1–0	2–0	1–0	0–0	2–0	1–1	4–1	—	2–1	1–0	4–1	1–0	0–1	1–1	1–1	0–1	2–0	4–3
Levante	1–0	2–1	3–0	2–1	3–0	5–4	1–1	0–0	2–0	4–1	—	2–1	4–2	1–0	2–1	3–0	1–0	1–0	1–0	2–0
Linense	3–2	1–0	0–0	0–0	0–0	1–1	1–1	1–0	1–1	1–1	1–1	—	1–0	1–0	3–0	0–0	0–0	1–0	1–0	1–0
Lorca	1–0	1–2	1–1	1–0	0–1	0–2	2–0	0–0	2–1	1–2	0–4	1–1	—	0–0	1–0	1–0	0–0	0–0	0–0	1–1
Marbella	3–1	1–1	1–0	3–1	1–1	2–1	3–0	1–1	2–5	1–1	0–2	2–2	3–0	—	1–1	2–1	0–0	3–0	2–0	2–1
Melilla	1–2	2–0	1–1	0–1	1–0	1–0	4–2	0–1	0–0	2–1	1–1	1–0	2–0	0–0	—	3–1	2–1	1–1	1–2	1–2
Nules	1–1	3–2	0–1	2–1	0–3	0–0	1–0	1–2	1–1	1–0	0–3	0–1	2–1	2–1	2–3	—	0–1	0–1	0–1	1–1
Olímpic Xàtiva	2–2	2–0	1–0	1–1	0–2	1–0	1–1	1–4	2–0	2–1	3–1	0–0	3–0	0–1	3–1	0–1	—	1–1	1–1	2–1
Atlético Sanluqueño	1–3	2–0	0–0	1–1	1–0	0–0	0–0	3–1	2–1	3–0	1–1	4–2	2–0	0–0	5–0	3–1	0–1	—	6–0	0–0
Torrevieja	1–0	2–0	3–0	3–0	2–1	4–4	0–2	1–1	0–2	5–1	0–3	3–1	1–0	0–1	1–0	1–1	1–1	1–2	—	1–1
Villarreal	1–1	1–0	2–2	2–0	1–1	0–0	1–0	1–0	4–1	1–1	3–0	3–2	2–0	1–0	2–0	8–0	0–2	1–1	0–0	—

Source: BDFútbol
Legend: Blue = home team win; Yellow = draw; Red = away team win.

=== Top goalscorers ===
Goalscorers	Goals	Team
(Spain) Antonio López	17	Levante
(Spain) José Luis Mínguez	17	Atlético Sanluqueño
(Spain) Adriano García	16	Villarreal
(Spain) Antonio López	16	Albacete
(Spain) Julio Cabello	16	Algeciras

=== Top goalkeepers ===
Goalkeeper	Goals	Matches	Average	Team
(Spain) Manolo López	16	35	0.46	Ceuta
(Spain) Antonio Museros	27	37	0.73	Levante
(Spain) Juan Tapia	24	31	0.77	Marbella
(Spain) Pedro Torrano	27	35	0.77	Atlético Sanluqueño
(Spain) Juan Miguel San Román	29	36	0.81	Gandía
