= SD Lagunak =

Lagunak
- Full name: Sociedad Deportiva Lagunak
- Founded: 1975
- Ground: Sociedad Lagunak, Barañáin, Navarre, Spain
- Capacity: 500
- Chairman: José Luís Ruíz
- Manager: David Marcén
- League: Primera Autonómica
- 2024–25: Primera Autonómica, 5th of 18
| Home colours | Away colours |

Sociedad Deportiva Lagunak is a Spanish football team based in Barañáin in the autonomous community of Navarre. Founded in 1975, it plays in Primera Autonómica. Its stadium is Estadio Sociedad Lagunak with a capacity of 500 seaters.

The club is better known for its women's team, which used to play in Primera División.

== Season to season ==
| Season | Tier | Division | Place | Copa del Rey |
|---|---|---|---|---|
| 1990–91 | 6 | 1ª Reg. | 7th | |
| 1991–92 | 6 | 1ª Reg. | 2nd | |
| 1992–93 | 5 | Reg. Pref. | 15th | |
| 1993–94 | 5 | Reg. Pref. | 1st | |
| 1994–95 | 4 | 3ª | 4th | |
| 1995–96 | 4 | 3ª | 19th | |
| 1996–97 | 5 | Reg. Pref. | 12th | |
| 1997–98 | 5 | Reg. Pref. | 14th | |
| 1998–99 | 6 | 1ª Reg. | 7th | |
| 1999–2000 | 6 | 1ª Reg. | 2nd | |
| 2000–01 | 6 | 1ª Reg. | 1st | |
| 2001–02 | 6 | 1ª Reg. | 3rd | |
| 2002–03 | 6 | 1ª Reg. | 1st | |
| 2003–04 | 5 | Reg. Pref. | 15th | |
| 2004–05 | 5 | Reg. Pref. | 5th | |
| 2005–06 | 5 | Reg. Pref. | 1st | |
| 2006–07 | 4 | 3ª | 19th | |
| 2007–08 | 5 | Reg. Pref. | 1st | |
| 2008–09 | 4 | 3ª | 20th | |
| 2009–10 | 5 | Reg. Pref. | 8th | |

| Season | Tier | Division | Place | Copa del Rey |
|---|---|---|---|---|
| 2010–11 | 5 | Reg. Pref. | 5th | |
| 2011–12 | 5 | Reg. Pref. | 2nd | |
| 2012–13 | 4 | 3ª | 20th | |
| 2013–14 | 5 | Reg. Pref. | 5th | |
| 2014–15 | 5 | Reg. Pref. | 8th | |
| 2015–16 | 5 | 1ª Aut. | 7th | |
| 2016–17 | 5 | 1ª Aut. | 17th | |
| 2017–18 | 6 | Reg. Pref. | 4th | |
| 2018–19 | 6 | Reg. Pref. | 2nd | |
| 2019–20 | 5 | 1ª Aut. | 15th | |
| 2020–21 | 5 | 1ª Aut. | 6th | |
| 2021–22 | 6 | 1ª Aut. | 1st | |
| 2022–23 | 5 | 3ª Fed. | 8th | |
| 2023–24 | 5 | 3ª Fed. | 16th | |
| 2024–25 | 6 | 1ª Aut. | 5th | |
| 2025–26 | 6 | 1ª Aut. | | |

- 5 seasons in Tercera División
- 2 seasons in Tercera Federación
