= Estrella CF =

Estrella
- Full name: Estrella Club de Fútbol
- Founded: 1946
- Ground: Las Palmitas, Santa Lucía de Tirajana, Canary Islands, Spain
- Capacity: 3,500
- Chairman: Óscar Ascanio Betancor
- Manager: Ángel Luis
- League: Tercera Federación – Group 12
- 2025–26: Interinsular Preferente, 1st of 19 (champions)
- Website: http://www.estrellacf.com/
| Home colours | Away colours |

Estrella Club de Fútbol is a Spanish football team based in Santa Lucía de Tirajana, in the autonomous community of Canary Islands. Founded in 1946, it plays in Tercera Federación – Group 12, holding home matches at Estadio Las Palmitas.

== Season to season ==
| Season | Tier | Division | Place | Copa del Rey |
|---|---|---|---|---|
| 1967–68 | 6 | 3ª Reg. | 6th | |
| 1968–69 | 6 | 3ª Reg. | 3rd | |
| 1969–70 | 6 | 3ª Reg. | 4th | |
| 1970–71 | 6 | 3ª Reg. | 2nd | |
| 1971–72 | 5 | 2ª Reg. | 14th | |
| 1972–73 | 6 | 3ª Reg. | 12th | |
| 1973–74 | 6 | 3ª Reg. | 14th | |
| 1974–75 | 6 | 3ª Reg. | 4th | |
| 1975–76 | 6 | 3ª Reg. | 7th | |
| 1976–77 | 6 | 3ª Reg. | 1st | |
| 1977–78 | 7 | 2ª Reg. | 3rd | |
| 1978–79 | 7 | 2ª Reg. | 3rd | |
| 1979–80 | 6 | 1ª Reg. | 8th | |
| 1980–81 | 5 | Reg. Pref. | 2nd | |
| 1981–82 | 4 | 3ª | 17th | |
| 1982–83 | 5 | Reg. Pref. | 8th | |
| 1983–84 | 5 | Reg. Pref. | 10th | |
| 1984–85 | 5 | Reg. Pref. | 7th | |
| 1985–86 | 5 | Reg. Pref. | 4th | |
| 1986–87 | 5 | Reg. Pref. | 7th | |

| Season | Tier | Division | Place | Copa del Rey |
|---|---|---|---|---|
| 1987–88 | 5 | Int. Pref. | 7th | |
| 1988–89 | 5 | Int. Pref. | 5th | |
| 1989–90 | 5 | Int. Pref. | 4th | |
| 1990–91 | 5 | Int. Pref. | 4th | |
| 1991–92 | 5 | Int. Pref. | 4th | |
| 1992–93 | 4 | 3ª | 6th | |
| 1993–94 | 4 | 3ª | 8th | First round |
| 1994–95 | 4 | 3ª | 1st | |
| 1995–96 | 4 | 3ª | 15th | |
| 1996–97 | 4 | 3ª | 16th | |
| 1997–98 | 4 | 3ª | 18th | |
| 1998–99 | 5 | Int. Pref. | 17th | |
| 1999–2000 | 6 | 1ª Reg. | 13th | |
| 2000–01 | 6 | 1ª Reg. | 5th | |
| 2001–02 | 6 | 1ª Reg. | 4th | |
| 2002–03 | 6 | 1ª Reg. | 4th | |
| 2003–04 | 6 | 1ª Reg. | 3rd | |
| 2004–05 | 5 | Int. Pref. | 10th | |
| 2005–06 | 5 | Int. Pref. | 6th | |
| 2006–07 | 5 | Int. Pref. | 17th | |

| Season | Tier | Division | Place | Copa del Rey |
|---|---|---|---|---|
| 2007–08 | 6 | 1ª Reg. | 6th | |
| 2008–09 | 6 | 1ª Reg. | 2nd | |
| 2009–10 | 5 | Int. Pref. | 2nd | |
| 2010–11 | 5 | Int. Pref. | 3rd | |
| 2011–12 | 4 | 3ª | 7th | |
| 2012–13 | 4 | 3ª | 3rd | |
| 2013–14 | 4 | 3ª | 5th | |
| 2014–15 | 4 | 3ª | 18th | |
| 2015–16 | 5 | Int. Pref. | 1st | |
| 2016–17 | 4 | 3ª | 15th | |
| 2017–18 | 4 | 3ª | 19th | |
| 2018–19 | 5 | Int. Pref. | 3rd | |
| 2019–20 | 5 | Int. Pref. | 4th | |
| 2020–21 | 5 | Int. Pref. | 5th | |
| 2021–22 | 6 | Int. Pref. | 1st | |
| 2022–23 | 5 | 3ª Fed. | 16th | |
| 2023–24 | 6 | Int. Pref. | 3rd | |
| 2024–25 | 5 | 3ª Fed. | 16th | |
| 2025–26 | 6 | Int. Pref. | 1st | |
| 2026–27 | 5 | 3ª Fed. | | |

- 13 seasons in Tercera División
- 3 seasons in Tercera Federación
