= Tous, Spain =

- Municipality
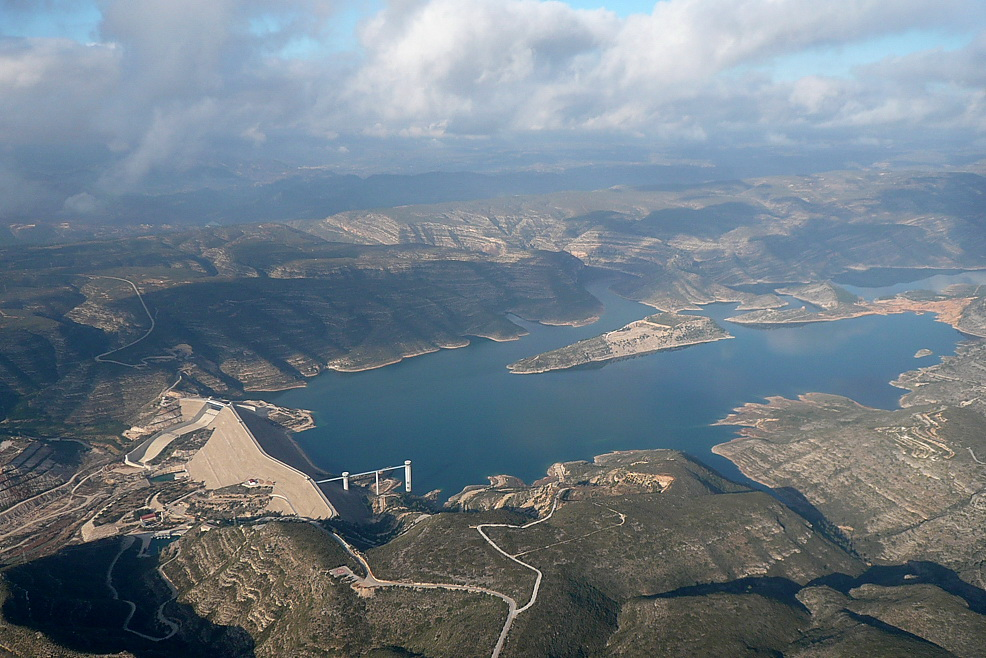
- Tous reservoir

- Flag Coat of arms

- Location in Spain
- Coordinates: 39°8′N 0°35′W
- Country: Spain
- Autonomous community: Valencian Community
- Province: Valencia
- Comarca: Ribera Alta
- Judicial district: Alzira

Government
  - Alcalde: Cristóbal García Santafilomena (People's Party)

Area
  - Total: 127.50 km^{2} (49.23 sq mi)
- Elevation: 64 m (210 ft)

Population (2023)
  - Total: 1,352
  - Density: 10.60/km^{2} (27.46/sq mi)
- Demonym: Togüero/a
- Time zone: UTC+1 (CET)
  - Summer (DST): UTC+2 (CEST)
- Postal code: 46269
- Official language(s): Spanish
- Website: Official website

Tous (Valencian pronunciation: [ˈtɔws]) is a municipality in the Valencian Community, in the province of Valencia. The town is notable for the dam failure which occurred on 20 October 1982, when an unusually severe rainfall swelled the river Jucar, breaking the Tous Dam. The dam operator was unable to open the spillway gate, and the water overtopped the dam, which then failed, provoking a flood of 16,000 m^{3}/s and more than 30 casualties. The flood was called La Pantanada.

== See also ==
- List of municipalities in Valencia
