= Tomelloso CF =

Spanish football club

Tomelloso
- Full name: Tomelloso Club de Fútbol
- Founded: 1979 (as Atlético Tomelloso)
- Dissolved: 2015
- Ground: Estadio Municipal, Tomelloso, Castile-La Mancha, Spain
- Capacity: 5,000
- Chairman: (Spain) Francisco Muñoz
- Manager: (Spain) Ignacio Galindo
- 2014–15: Primera Autonómica Preferente – Group 1, retired
Home colours	Away colours

Tomelloso Club de Fútbol was a Spanish football team based in Tomelloso, in the autonomous community of Castile-La Mancha. It played its home games at Estadio Municipal de Tomelloso, which has a capacity of 5,000 seats.

Founded in 1979 as a replacement for Tomelloso CF, the club was finally dissolved in January 2015.

== Season to season ==
Season	Tier	Division	Place	Copa del Rey
1979–80	8	3ª Reg. P.	4th	
1980–81	8	3ª Reg. P.	1st	
1981–82	7	2ª Reg.	2nd	
1982–83	6	1ª Reg.	1st	
1983–84	5	Reg. Pref.	10th	
1984–85	5	Reg. Pref.	1st	
1985–86	4	3ª	17th	
1986–87	5	Reg. Pref.	1st	
1987–88	4	3ª	1st	
1988–89	3	2ª B	5th	
1989–90	3	2ª B	11th	
1990–91	3	2ª B	16th	Third round
1991–92	3	2ª B	12th	Fourth round
1992–93	3	2ª B	16th	Second round
1993–94	3	2ª B	18th	Second round
1994–95	4	3ª	2nd	First round
1995–96	4	3ª	1st	
1996–97	4	3ª	1st	

Season	Tier	Division	Place	Copa del Rey
1997–98	4	3ª	5th	
1998–99	4	3ª	1st	
1999–2000	4	3ª	17th	
2000–01	4	3ª	8th	
2001–02	4	3ª	1st	
2002–03	4	3ª	4th	First round
2003–04	3	2ª B	15th	
2004–05	3	2ª B	17th	
2005–06	4	3ª	9th	
2006–07	4	3ª	6th	
2007–08	4	3ª	4th	
2008–09	4	3ª	7th	
2009–10	4	3ª	17th	
2010–11	4	3ª	12th	
2011–12	4	3ª	17th	
2012–13	5	Aut. Pref.	7th	
2013–14	5	Aut. Pref.	8th	
2014–15	5	Aut. Pref.	(R)	

- 8 seasons in Segunda División B
- 18 seasons in Tercera División

== Notable former players ==
- (Ghana) Baba Sule
- (Spain) Manuel Cabezas
- (Spain) Javi Hernández
- (Spain) Raúl Ibáñez
- (Spain) Carlos Llorens
- (Spain) Jorge Pinto
- (Spain) Daniel Soria
