= Burguillos del Cerro =

- municipality
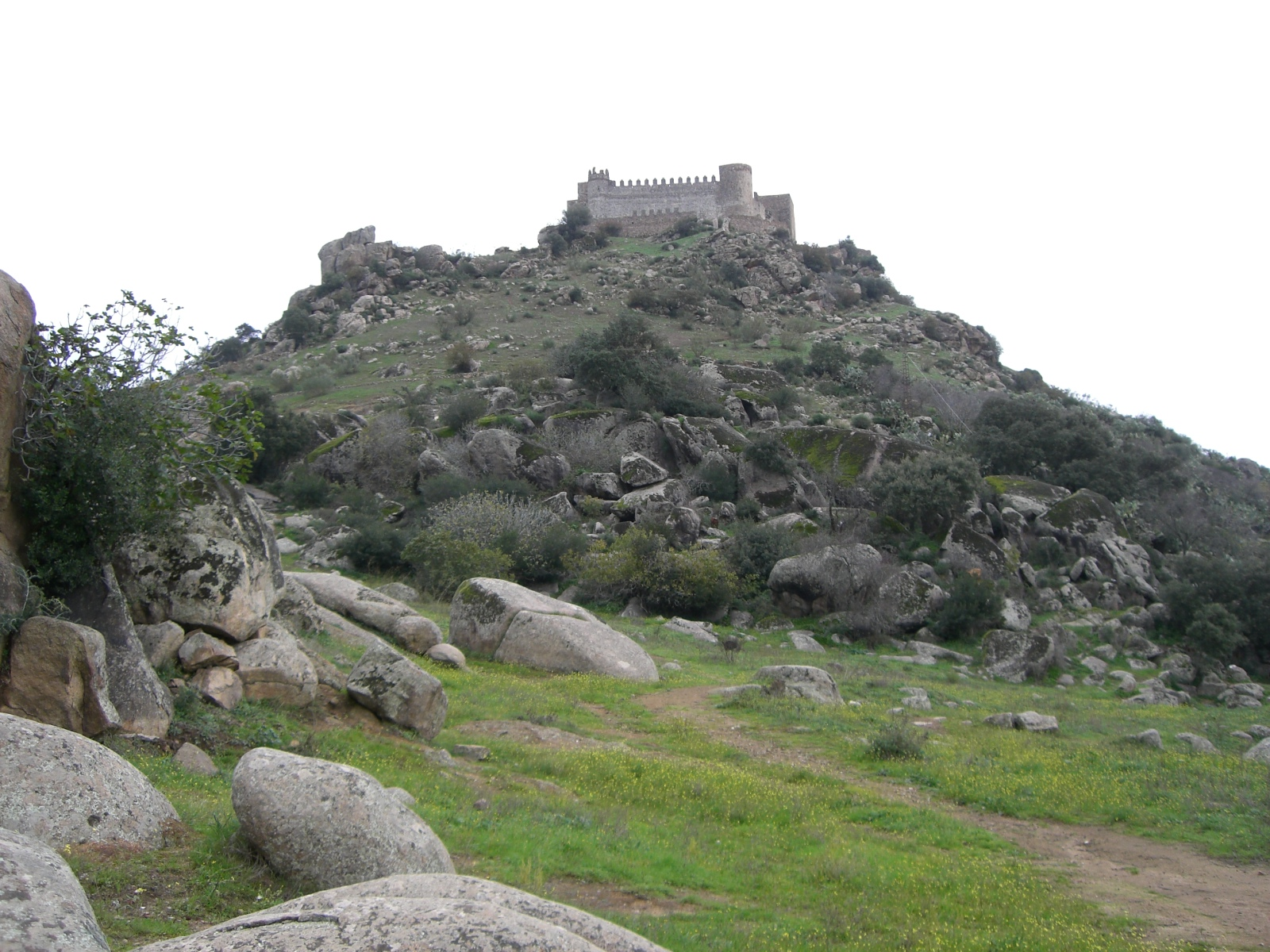
- Castle of Burguillos del Cerro

- Coat of arms

- Location of Burguillos del Cerro within Extremadura
- Coordinates: 38°22′48″N 6°35′26″W
- Country: Spain
- Autonomous community: Extremadura
- Province: Badajoz
- Municipality: Burguillos del Cerro

Area
  - Total: 187.5 km^{2} (72.4 sq mi)
- Elevation: 419 m (1,375 ft)

Population (2025-01-01)
  - Total: 2,940
  - Density: 15.7/km^{2} (40.6/sq mi)
- Time zone: UTC+1 (CET)
  - Summer (DST): UTC+2 (CEST)

Burguillos del Cerro is a municipality in the province of Badajoz, Extremadura, Spain. It has a population of 3,284 and an area of 187.5 km^{2} (72.4 sq mi).

== See also ==
- List of municipalities in Badajoz
