= Spanish football rivalries =

There are several notable football rivalries in Spain, some of which attract worldwide attention.

== Summary ==
The history of association football in Spain dates from the 1890s, when the game was introduced to some port cities by British sailors and dock workers, and to other locations by locals who had been to Britain for education or work and had been exposed to the developing sport there. The earliest national competition was the 1902 Copa de la Coronación, followed by the introduction of the Copa del Rey a year later. In those formative decades, the dominant clubs were Athletic Bilbao, Real Madrid and FC Barcelona, a pattern which continued into the early editions of La Liga, the national league which was established in 1929.

The frequent meetings in league and cup competitions as well as each club's association with their respective home regions, led to the development of rivalries. The rivalry between Barcelona Catalonia and Real Madrid Castile known as El Clásico is widely regarded as one of the most prominent football rivalries and attracts a large international audience.

In the early 21st century, a significant rivalry developed between the two most prominent forwards in each team, Portuguese Cristiano Ronaldo and Argentinian Lionel Messi, who consistently vied to break goalscoring records and win global individual awards in addition to helping their clubs to several major finals, with their mutual levels of performance seldom seen in the past - this added a new element to the matches between them and generated even more attention from media and supporters.

The third team in the original triad of success, Athletic Bilbao from the Basque Country, have fallen far behind in terms of their profile and trophies won due to being based in a smaller city and having a self-imposed restriction limiting themselves to a small pool of players with a connection to their home territory. However, their meetings with their old foes still maintain a level of interest due to the sporting history and political aspects of their relationships. Those are the only three teams to have played every league season, so have the highest total of matches contested.

Atlético Madrid, Valencia and Sevilla form a group of clubs that are similar to Athletic Bilbao in terms of performance and cup wins. The have attendances of 40,000 or better on average but are still far behind Barcelona and Real Madrid in both respects. Their histories feature complicated relationships with the 'big two' and with one another, as well as being involved in other local rivalries including the Seville derby and the Valencia derby.

After the biggest clubs, there are several significant derbies or rivalries which usually fall into one of three categories: a local rivalry within the same city (most of these involve one of the six clubs above, such as the Derbi barceloní and the Madrid Derby); a regional rivalry involving two or more teams in the same autonomous community, (often with each representing a province within that region, as in the Basque derby and the Galician derby); or an inter-regional rivalry between clubs from neighbouring autonomous communities, for example Osasuna of Navarre and Real Zaragoza of Aragon. Teams with significant support each have ultras groups with diverse connections and policial affiliations, which have often led to violence between them.

The term morbo (roughly translating to morbid fascination and antagonism) has sometimes been used to describe the attitudes relating to the complex network of identities and relationships between Spanish clubs.

== List of rivalries ==
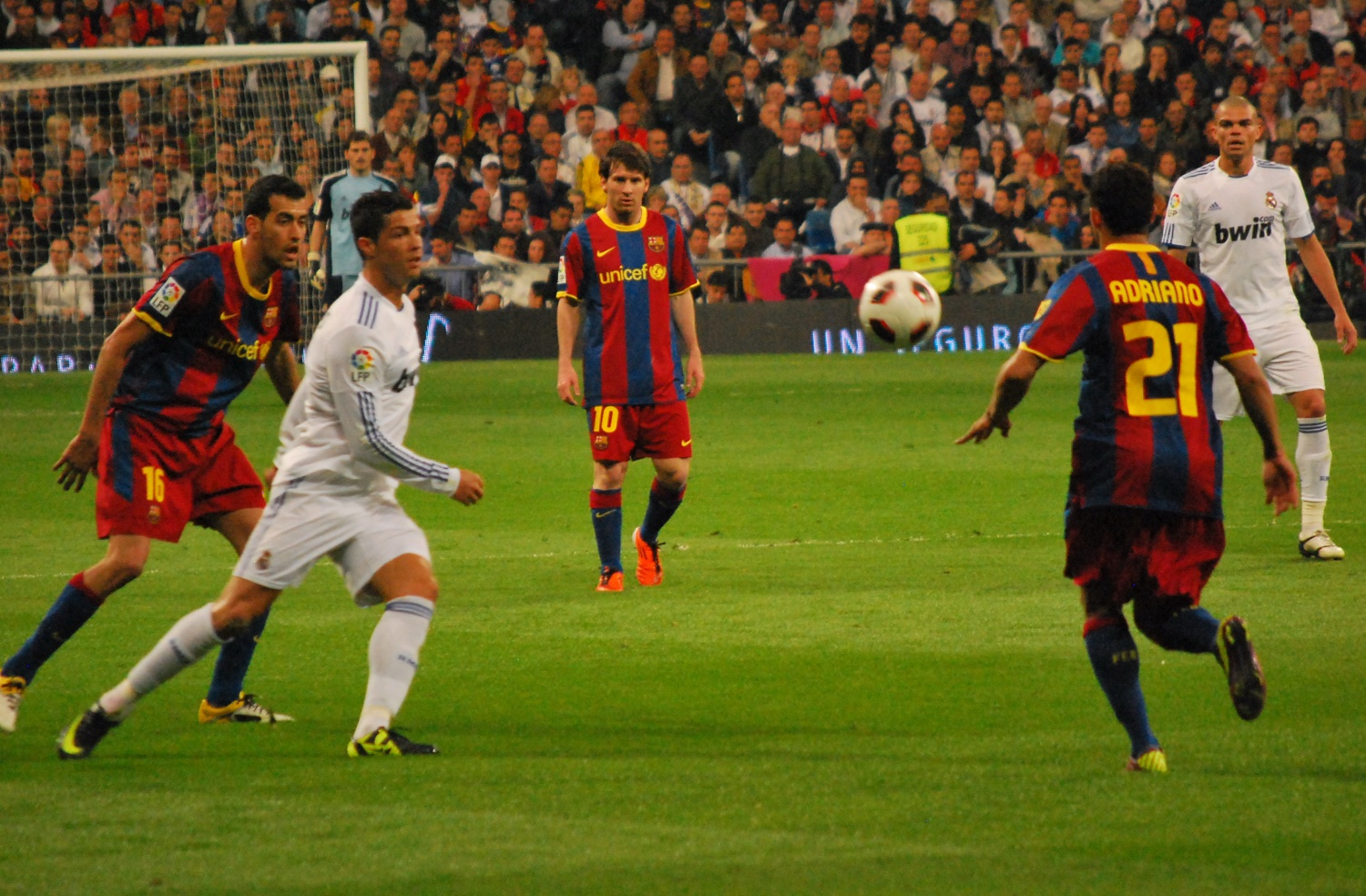
El Clásico, April 2011

- Derbi Barceloní (Barcelona v Espanyol)
- Madrid derby (Real Madrid v Atlético Madrid)
- Seville derby (Real Betis v Sevilla)
- Valencia derby (Levante v Valencia)
- Bilbao derby (Athletic Bilbao v SD Deusto)
- San Sebastián derby (Real Sociedad v Añorga KKE)
- Villarreal derby (Villarreal CF v Club Deportivo Roda)
- Derbi jerezano (Xerez v Jerez Industrial)
- Palma derby (Atlético Baleares v Mallorca)
- Murcia derby (Real Murcia v Ciudad de Murcia)
- Nuevo Derbi de Murcia (Real Murcia v UCAM Murcia)
- Pla de Barcelona derby (CE Europa v UE Sant Andreu)
- Salamanca derby / 'Derby of the 50 metres': (Salamanca v Unionistas)
- South Madrid derby (Getafe v Leganés)
- (Santa Cruz de) La Palma derby (Mensajero v Tenisca)

=== Provincial ===
- Derbi del Vallés Occidental (Sabadell v Terrassa)
- Alicante Province derby (Hércules v Elche)
- Derbi del interior de Alicante (CD Alcoyano v CD Eldense)
- Derbi gaditano (Cádiz v Xerez)
- Derbi jienense (Real Jaén v Linares)
- Derbi leonés (Cultural Leonesa v Ponferradina)
- Derbi de La Plana (Castellón v Villarreal CF)
- Badajoz derby (CD Badajoz v Mérida AD, alternatively Mérida AD v Extremadura UD)
- Derbi del Tajo (CD Toledo v CF Talavera de la Reina)
- Derbi pontevedrés (Pontevedra CF v Celta de Vigo)
- Derbi del camp de Tarragona (Gimnàstic v Reus)
- Derbi del Vinalopó (Elche CF v CD Eldense)
- Derbi de la Bahía (Cádiz vs San Fernando)
- Derbi campo gibraltareño (Linense v Algeciras)

=== Regional ===
- Galician derby "O noso derbi" (Celta Vigo v Deportivo A Coruña)
- Aragonese derby (Real Zaragoza v Huesca)
- Asturian derby (Real Oviedo v Sporting Gijón)
- Basque derby (Real Sociedad v Athletic Bilbao)
- Basque rivalries (in addition to the above, matches between any of Athletic Bilbao, Real Sociedad, Alavés and Eibar; sometimes interpreted as also including Osasuna)
- Canary Islands derby (Tenerife v Las Palmas)
- Derbi de la Comunitat (Valencia v Villarreal, alternatively Valencia v Elche)
- Derby of eastern Andalusia (Granada v Málaga)
- Derby of Andalusian Mediterranean (Málaga v Almería)
- Cantabrian derby (Racing de Santander v Gimnástica)
- Catalan derby (in addition to the Derbi barceloní, any two of Barcelona, Espanyol, Girona or Gimnàstic Tarragona)
- Extremaduran rivalries (in addition to the Badajoz and Cáceres provinces inner derbies, matches between CD Badajoz and CP Cacereño)
- Derby of the Region of Murcia (Cartagena v Real Murcia)
- Galician rivalries (in addition to the Galician derby, matches between Racing Ferrol, Compostela and Pontevedra)
- Derbi del Duero (Real Valladolid v Numancia)
- Derbi del Norte de África (Ceuta v Melilla)

=== Inter-regional ===
- Álava-Ebro rivalry (Alavés v Mirandés)
- Derbi de los Ancares (Lugo v Ponferradina)
- Derbi del Ebro (Real Zaragoza v Mirandés)
- Derbi del Moncayo (Real Zaragoza v Numancia)
- Derbi arlequinado (Ebro v Sabadell)
- Aragón–Navarre rivalry (Real Zaragoza vs CA Osasuna)
- Derbi del Cantábrico / 'Duel of the North' (Racing de Santander v Athletic Bilbao)
- Derbi de la frontera (Elche v Real Murcia)
- Derbi levantino (Hércules v Real Murcia)
- Derbi del estrecho (Ceuta v Algeciras)
- Atlético-Sevilla rivalry (Atlético Madrid v Sevilla FC)
- Atlético-Athletic rivalry (Atlético Madrid v Athletic)
- Derbi del Henares (RSD Alcalá v CD Guadalajara)

=== 'Clásicos' ===
- Los Clásicos Eternos: between the three La Liga clubs that have never been relegated:
  - El Clásico (Real Madrid v Barcelona)
    - List of El Clásico matches
    - Women's Clásico
  - El Viejo Clásico (Real Madrid v Athletic Bilbao)
  - Athletic-Barcelona clásico
- El Otro Clásico (Barcelona v Atlético Madrid)

== See also ==
- Association football and politics
- Football hooliganism#Spain
- Football in Spain
- Italy-Spain football rivalry
- Messi-Ronaldo rivalry
- National and regional identity in Spain
- Portugal-Spain football rivalry
