= Margarita Miranda Bordoy =

Spanish sporting director (1919–1979)

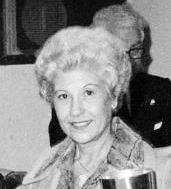
- Born: 1919; Barcelona
- Died: 8 July 1979; Palma (Mallorca)
- Occupation: sporting director
- Employer: CD Atlético Baleares
- Spouse: Vicente García Peñaranda
- Relatives: Joan Bordoy Cañellas

Margarita Miranda Bordoy (1919 – 8 July 1979) was a Spanish sporting director. She worked at the Spanish football club CD Atlético Baleares and is considered one of the pioneers of women in the world of football in the Balearic Islands.

== Life ==
Miranda was married to Vicente García Peñaranda, a doctor, surgeon, and one of the founders of the Clínica Peñaranda (a health center in Palma). He was known together with his brother Virgilio for organizing cultural discussions and for collaborating with Mallorcan working-class organizations.

After ending up as a widow in 1967, Miranda started obtaining more social influence through one of the football clubs in the city, CD Atlético Baleares. By 1970, she had become president of the community of co-owners of the Estadi Balear, the stadium of the football club. This was a function that she would hold until her death. Moreover, from 1974 onwards, she formed part of the club's board of directors on multiple successive occasions.

Due to her prominent role in local football and her widely recognized dedication, she received two public tributes in the Estadi Balear, in 1976 and in 1978, coinciding with editions of the Palma derby against RCD Mallorca, when both teams played in the Tercera División.

Between 1978 and 1979, Miranda formed a part of the commission that studied the possible fusion between CD Atlético Baleares and RCD Mallorca, when both entities found themselves in critical situations that seemed to endanger their survival. Out of all 10 commission members and representatives of both entities, she was the only woman.

At the time of her death in 1979, she was a figure in the local sports community and the football club.

Miranda was the niece of Joan Bordoy Cañellas, the well-known goalkeeper of CE Europa and the Catalan national football team in the 1920s.

== Posthumous recognitions ==
In 2022, CD Atlético Baleares announced the creation of the Margarita Miranda Trophy, an annual pre-season football tournament in honor of Miranda. In 2023, she was nominated for the Cornelius Atticus Distinction, the highest sports-related honor in the Balearic Islands.

== Bibliography ==
- Borchers, Liam (2023). The Story of Atlètic Balears. Groningen: Lulu. ISBN 978-1-4717-4271-2.
