= Margarita Miranda Trophy =

Football tournament in Palma, Mallorca

Margarita Miranda Trophy in Catalan: Trofeu Margarita Miranda
- Organiser(s): CD Atlético Baleares
- Founded: 2022; 4 years ago
- Region: Palma, Balearic Islands
- Teams: CD Atlético Baleares (women) and an invited team
- Most championships: CD Atlético Baleares (women) (3)
- Website: https://www.atleticobaleares.com/

The Margarita Miranda Trophy (Catalan: Trofeu Margalida Miranda), officially the Trofeu Margarita Miranda, is an annual pre-season football tournament in Palma (Mallorca, Balearic Islands, Spain). The tournament is organized by CD Atlético Baleares, played in the Estadi Balear, and disputed between the women's team of Atlético Baleares and an invited team. The tournament is named after Margarita Miranda Bordoy, a sporting director at Atlético Baleares during the 1960s and 1970s and one of the first women with a high function in the world of Balearic football.

== Editions ==
Year	Ed.	Champion	Score	Runner-up	Other comments
2022	1st	Atlético Baleares	4-0	Balearic women's football team	One match
2023	2nd	CE Europa	2-1	Atlético Baleares	One match
2024	3rd	Atlético Baleares	2-0	Atlético Baleares B	One match
2025	4th	Atlético Baleares	1-0	Mallorca International FC	One match

== Titles by club ==
- 3 trophies: CD Atlético Baleares
- 1 trophy: CE Europa

== Sources ==
- Borchers, Liam (2023). The Story of Atlètic Balears. Groningen: Lulu. ISBN 978-1-4717-4271-2.
