= Palma derby =

Palma derby Derbi palmesà 'Derbi palmesano (in Spanish)
- Location: (Palma de Mallorca) Palma, Balearic Islands, Spain
- Teams: RCD Mallorca; CD Atlético Baleares
- First meeting: RS Alfonso XIII FC 2–1 Baleares FC; Friendly (13 March 1921)
- Latest meeting: RCD Mallorca 3–2 CD Atlético Baleares; Segunda División B, group III (21 January 2018)
- Stadiums: Visit Mallorca Stadium (RCD Mallorca); Estadi Balear (CD Atlético Baleares)

Statistics
- Total meetings: 83
- Most wins: RCD Mallorca (47)

The rivalry between RCD Mallorca and CD Atlético Baleares, known as the Palma derby (Catalan: derbi palmesà, Spanish: derbi palmesano), is the derby between the main football clubs in Palma de Mallorca (Mallorca, Balearic Islands, Spain).

== History ==
Both clubs are, by far, the oldest in the capital of the Balearic Islands (the rest were founded from the mid-1960s) and have known an intense rivalry since the 1920s, due to the social, economical, and political differences between their respective founders. While RCD Mallorca (then called Real Sociedad Alfonso XIII FC after King Alfonso XIII) was led by the local upper class, who favoured the Spanish state, CD Atlético Baleares (then called Baleares FC) was known as the club of the local working class and was formed by Republicans. This character is very diluted at present and both clubs are much more heterogeneous than in the beginning, but the foundational character is still very present when defining the rivalry between the supporter groups.

Their rivalry has remained very alive at street level, despite being clubs at very different sporting levels from the 1960s onwards - and especially since the 1980s, when Mallorca made a significant improvement and became a regular in the Primera and Segunda Division, while Atlético Baleares remained in the lower Segunda Division B and Tercera División.

The first edition of the Palma derby took place on the 13th of March 1921, between the second team of Alfonso XIII and the first of Baleares in the stadium of Bons Aires, property of Alfonso XIII. The match ended early because of a pitch battle between players and the public when Alfonso XIII was winning by 2 goals to 1.

The rivalry has remained alive for more than a century despite the name changes of the two clubs. RCD Mallorca has been known as RS Alfonso XIII FC (1916-1931), CD Mallorca (1931-1949) and RCD Mallorca (since 1949). CD Atlético Baleares, on the other hand, has been known as Baleares FC (1920-1942), CD Atlético-Baleares (1942-1943), and CD Atlético Baleares (since 1943). The latter club is called CE Atlètic Balears in the local Mallorcan dialect of Catalan.

At insular level, for a time two clubs shared rivalry with a third team: CE Constància from the neighboring town of Inca, especially until the 1960s. In the other islands of the Balearic archipelago, the main rivals were SD Ibiza (from Ibiza, the capital of the Pityusic Islands) and UD Mahón (from Mahón, the capital of Menorca). The aforementioned rise in sporting achievement that RCD Mallorca lived from the 1960s reduced all these rivalries to a minimum, except the one with Atlético Baleares.

The last derby, played in 2018 in Segunda División B, aroused great excitement and showed that the rivalry is still very much alive.

== League matches ==
Only clashes between first teams are listed. Therefore, the confrontations of Atlético Baleares against the RCD Mallorca subsidiaries (first Mallorca Atlético and currently RCD Mallorca B) are not included.

Season	Category	Stadium	Home team	Score	Away team	Comments
1923–24	Campeonato Regional de Mallorca	Bons Aires	RS Alfonso XIII FC	4 – 1	Baleares FC	—
1923–24	Campeonato Regional de Mallorca	Son Canals	Baleares FC	0 – 1	RS Alfonso XIII FC	—
1924–25	Campeonato Regional de Mallorca	Bons Aires	RS Alfonso XIII FC	1 – 0	Baleares FC	—
1924–25	Campeonato Regional de Mallorca	Son Canals	Baleares FC	2 – 0	RS Alfonso XIII FC	—
1925–26	Campeonato Regional de Mallorca	Son Canals	Baleares FC	1 – 2	RS Alfonso XIII FC	—
1925–26	Campeonato Regional de Mallorca	Bons Aires	RS Alfonso XIII FC	—	Baleares FC	It was not disputed when the competition was split mid-season. Baleares FC left the Balearic Federation
1926–27	Campeonato Regional de Mallorca	Son Canals	Baleares FC	0 – 1	RS Alfonso XIII FC	—
1926–27	Campeonato Regional de Mallorca	Bons Aires	RS Alfonso XIII FC	3 – 0	Baleares FC	—
1927–28	Campeonato Regional de Mallorca	It was not disputed when the competition was split before the season began. RS Alfonso XIII FC left the Balearic Federation				
1928–29	Campeonato Regional de Mallorca	Son Canals	Baleares FC	2 – 3	RS Alfonso XIII FC	—
1928–29	Campeonato Regional de Mallorca	Bons Aires	RS Alfonso XIII FC	2 – 0	Baleares FC	—
1929–30	Campeonato Regional de Mallorca	Son Canals	Baleares FC	0 – 4	RS Alfonso XIII FC	—
1929–30	Campeonato Regional de Mallorca	Bons Aires	RS Alfonso XIII FC	4 – 1	Baleares FC	—
1930–31	Campeonato Regional de Mallorca	Bons Aires	RS Alfonso XIII FC	2 – 0	Baleares FC	—
1930–31	Campeonato Regional de Mallorca	Son Canals	Baleares FC	1 – 0	RS Alfonso XIII FC	—
1931–32	Campeonato Regional de Mallorca	Bons Aires	CD Mallorca	1 – 1	Baleares FC	—
1931–32	Campeonato Regional de Mallorca	Son Canals	Baleares FC	2 – 1	CD Mallorca	—
1932–33	Campeonato Regional de Mallorca	Bons Aires	CD Mallorca	4 – 1	Baleares FC	—
1932–33	Campeonato Regional de Mallorca	Son Canals	Baleares FC	1 – 1	CD Mallorca	—
1933–34	Campeonato Regional de Mallorca	Son Canals	Baleares FC	1 – 0	CD Mallorca	—
1933–34	Campeonato Regional de Mallorca	Bons Aires	CD Mallorca	1 – 1	Baleares FC	—
1934–35	Campeonato Regional de Mallorca	Son Canals	Baleares FC	2 – 0	CD Mallorca	—
1934–35	Campeonato Regional de Mallorca	Bons Aires	CD Mallorca	0 – 2	Baleares FC	—
1935–36	Campeonato Regional de Mallorca	Bons Aires	CD Mallorca	2 – 2	Baleares FC	—
1935–36	Campeonato Regional de Mallorca	Son Canals	Baleares FC	1 – 0	CD Mallorca	—
1936–37	Campeonato Regional de Mallorca	Bons Aires	CD Mallorca	7 – 1	Baleares FC	—
1936–37	Campeonato Regional de Mallorca	Son Canals	Baleares FC	2 – 4	CD Mallorca	—
1937–38	Campeonato Regional de Mallorca	Bons Aires	CD Mallorca	2 – 1	Baleares FC	—
1937–38	Campeonato Regional de Mallorca	Son Canals	Baleares FC	1 – 1	CD Mallorca	—
1938–39	Campeonato Regional de Mallorca	CD Mallorca did not compete this season to have much of the workforce mobilized in Spanish Civil War				
1939–40	Campeonato Regional de Mallorca	Son Canals	Baleares FC	2 – 4	CD Mallorca	—
1939–40	Campeonato Regional de Mallorca	Bons Aires	CD Mallorca	3 – 0	Baleares FC	—
1940–41	Primera Regional de Mallorca	Bons Aires	CD Mallorca	2 – 1	Baleares FC	—
1940–41	Primera Regional de Mallorca	Son Canals	Baleares FC	1 – 3	CD Mallorca	—
1941–42	Primera Regional de Mallorca	Son Canals	Baleares FC	2 – 3	CD Mallorca	—
1941–42	Primera Regional de Mallorca	Bons Aires	CD Mallorca	1 – 0	Baleares FC	—
1942–43	Primera Regional de Mallorca	Son Canals	At. Baleares	3 – 3	CD Mallorca	—
1942–43	Primera Regional de Mallorca	Bons Aires	CD Mallorca	6 – 1	At. Baleares	—
1943–44	Tercera División, group IV	Bons Aires	CD Mallorca	1 – 1	At. Baleares	—
1943–44	Tercera División, group IV	Son Canals	At. Baleares	0 – 2	CD Mallorca	—
1948–49	Tercera División, group III	Es Fortí	CD Mallorca	2 – 1	At. Baleares	—
1948–49	Tercera División, group III	Son Canals	At. Baleares	2 – 0	CD Mallorca	—
1951–52	Segunda División, group II	Son Canals	At. Baleares	0 – 2	RCD Mallorca	—
1951–52	Segunda División, group II	Es Fortí	RCD Mallorca	2 – 0	At. Baleares	—
1952–53	Segunda División, group II	Es Fortí	RCD Mallorca	1 – 1	At. Baleares	—
1952–53	Segunda División, group II	Son Canals	At. Baleares	1 – 1	RCD Mallorca	—
1954–55	Tercera División, group VIII	Es Fortí	RCD Mallorca	3 – 2	At. Baleares	—
1954–55	Tercera División, group VIII	Son Canals	At. Baleares	1 – 2	RCD Mallorca	—
1955–56	Tercera División, group VIII	Son Canals	At. Baleares	3 – 2	RCD Mallorca	—
1955–56	Tercera División, group VIII	Lluís Sitjar	RCD Mallorca	2 – 2	At. Baleares	—
1956–57	Tercera División, group VIII	Lluís Sitjar	RCD Mallorca	1 – 1	At. Baleares	—
1956–57	Tercera División, group VIII	Son Canals	At. Baleares	0 – 3	RCD Mallorca	—
1957–58	Tercera División, group VIII	Son Canals	At. Baleares	1 – 2	RCD Mallorca	—
1957–58	Tercera División, group VIII	Lluís Sitjar	RCD Mallorca	1 – 1	At. Baleares	—
1958–59	Tercera División, group VIII	Lluís Sitjar	RCD Mallorca	1 – 0	At. Baleares	—
1958–59	Tercera División, group VIII	Son Canals	At. Baleares	0 – 0	RCD Mallorca	—
1975–76	Tercera División, group III	Estadi Balear	At. Baleares	3 – 1	RCD Mallorca	—
1975–76	Tercera División, group III	Lluís Sitjar	RCD Mallorca	0 – 0	At. Baleares	—
1976–77	Tercera División, group III	Estadi Balear	At. Baleares	2 – 0	RCD Mallorca	—
1976–77	Tercera División, group III	Lluís Sitjar	RCD Mallorca	1 – 1	At. Baleares	—
1977–78	Segunda División B, group II	Estadi Balear	At. Baleares	2 – 1	RCD Mallorca	—
1977–78	Segunda División B, group II	Lluís Sitjar	RCD Mallorca	1 – 0	At. Baleares	—
1978–79	Tercera División, group V	Estadi Balear	At. Baleares	0 – 0	RCD Mallorca	—
1978–79	Tercera División, group V	Lluís Sitjar	RCD Mallorca	2 – 1	At. Baleares	—
1979–80	Tercera División, group VIII	Estadi Balear	At. Baleares	0 – 2	CD Mallorca	—
1979–80	Tercera División, group VIII	Lluís Sitjar	RCD Mallorca	1 – 1	At. Baleares	—
2017–18	Segunda División B, group III	Son Malferit	At. Baleares	0 – 0	RCD Mallorca	—
2017–18	Segunda División B, group III	Son Moix	RCD Mallorca	3 – 2	At. Baleares	—

== Copa del Rey ==
Only clashes between first teams are listed. Therefore, the confrontations of Atlético Baleares against the RCD Mallorca subsidiaries (first Mallorca Atlético and currently RCD Mallorca B) are not included.

Season	Stadium	Round	Home team	Score	Away team	Comments
1948–49	Es Fortí	1st round	CD Mallorca	1 – 0	At. Baleares	Single match
1986–87	Estadi Balear	Round of 32	At. Baleares	2 – 4	RCD Mallorca	Single match

== Other tournaments ==
Only clashes between first teams are listed. Therefore, the confrontations of Atlético Baleares against the RCD Mallorca subsidiaries (first Mallorca Atlético and currently RCD Mallorca B) are not included.

Season	Tournament	Stadium	Round	Home Team	Score	Away team	Comments
1921	Copa Ayuntamiento de Palma	Bons Aires	Single round	RS Alfonso XIII FC	4 – 0	Baleares FC	Competition organized by Palma City Council
1933–34	Copa Presidente de la República	Son Canals	—	Baleares FC	1 – 3	CD Mallorca	—
1933–34	Copa Presidente de la República	Bons Aires	—	CD Mallorca	4 – 0	Baleares FC	—
1934–35	Copa Presidente de la República	Bons Aires	—	CD Mallorca	1 – 1	Baleares FC	—
1934–35	Copa Presidente de la República	Son Canals	—	Baleares FC	3 – 3	CD Mallorca	—
1935–36	Copa Presidente de la República	Son Canals	—	Baleares FC	0 – 0	CD Mallorca	—
1935–36	Copa Presidente de la República	Bons Aires	—	CD Mallorca	1 – 1	Baleares FC	—
1937–38	Liga Mallorca	Son Canals	—	Baleares FC	0 – 6	CD Mallorca	—
1937–38	Liga Mallorca	Bons Aires	—	CD Mallorca	—	Baleares FC	Suspended by withdrawal of the CD Mallorca from the competition
1939–40	Liga Mallorca	Bons Aires	—	CD Mallorca	1 – 1	Baleares FC	—
1939–40	Liga Mallorca	Son Canals	—	Baleares FC	1 – 5	CD Mallorca	—
1940–41	Liga Mallorca	Son Canals	—	Baleares FC	0 – 6	CD Mallorca	—
1940–41	Liga Mallorca	Bons Aires	—	CD Mallorca	5 – 1	Baleares FC	—
1952–53	Copa RFEF	Es Fortí	2nd round	RCD Mallorca	4 – 2	Baleares FC	—
1952–53	Copa RFEF	Son Canals	2nd round	Baleares FC	1 – 1	RCD Mallorca	—
1971	Nicolau Brondo Trophy	Estadi Balear	Single match	At. Baleares	0 – 1	RCD Mallorca	—
1972	Nicolau Brondo Trophy	Estadi Balear	Single match	At. Baleares	1 – 4	RCD Mallorca	—
1984	Nicolau Brondo Trophy	Estadi Balear	Single match	At. Baleares	0 – 1	RCD Mallorca	—
1985	Nicolau Brondo Trophy	Estadi Balear	Single match	At. Baleares	1 – 2	RCD Mallorca	—
1993	Friendly	Estadi Balear	Single match	At. Baleares	0 – 6	RCD Mallorca	Commemoration 50 years merger CD Atlético Baleares
1994	Nicolau Brondo Trophy	Estadi Balear	Single match	At. Baleares	1 – 1 (*)	RCD Mallorca	—
2008	Illes Balears Trophy	Bintaufa, Mahón	Semi-finals	RCD Mallorca	4 – 2	At. Baleares	—

(*) RCD Mallorca won on penalties.

== Bibliography ==
- Amengual Salas, Vicenç (2021). Orsai: L'Atlètic Balears. Entre la sociologia i el futbol [Orsai. Atlètic Balears. Between sociology and football] (in Catalan). Palma: Illa Edicions. ISBN 978-84-122255-4-9.
- Borchers, Liam (2023). The Story of Atlètic Balears. Groningen: Lulu. ISBN 978-1-4717-4271-2.
- García Gargallo, Manuel (2018). Campeonatos regionales de Baleares. Orígenes y desarrollo 1900-1940 [Regional championships of the Balearic Islands. Origins and evolution 1900-1940] (in Spanish). Oviedo: CIHEFE. ISBN 978-84-948698-6-0.
- García Gargallo, Manuel (2013). Els orígens de l'Atlètic Balears (1920-1942). Dels inicis a la fusió [The origins of Atlètic Balears (1920-1942): From the beginnings to the fusion] (in Catalan). Barcelona: Lulu.
- García Gargallo, Manuel (2020). L'Atlètic Balears (1920-1942): Els primers anys d'una entitat centenària [Atlètic Balears (1920-1942): The first years of a centenary entity] (in Catalan). Palma: Documenta Balear. ISBN 978-84-18441-08-0.
- Pasamontes, Juan Carlos (2005). R.S. Alfonso XIII. La cara oculta del Real CD Mallorca. 1916-1931 [R.S. Alfonso XIII. The hidden face of Real CD Mallorca. 1916-1931] (in Spanish). Palma: Edicions Cort. ISBN 84-89034-81-8.
- Ramis Fernández, Xesc (2017). El derbi de Palma. Historia de una rivalidad vecinal [The Palma derby. The history of a rivalry between neighbours] (in Spanish). Archived from the original on 2024-12-19.
- Salas Fuster, Antoni (2009). L'Atlètic Baleares. Una història de supervivència [Atlètic Balears. A history of survival] (in Catalan). Palma: Ingrama SA. ISBN 978-84-85932-78-8. DL 272-2009.
- Vidal Perelló, Miquel; Vidal Reynés, Jordi (2005). Història del RCD Mallorca (1916-2004) [History of RCD Mallorca (1916-2004)] (in Catalan). Palma: Documenta Balear. ISBN 84-96376-16-8.
- Vidal Perelló, Miquel; Vidal Reynés, Jordi (2016). Un siglo con el RCD Mallorca 1916-2016 [A century with RCD Mallorca 1916-2016] (in Spanish). Palma: Comisión Centenario del Real Mallorca. ISBN 978-84-608-7936-7.
