= Association football and politics =

Association football and politics are connected in club identities, clashes, and footballers who choose a career in politics. Association football has played a role in maintaining the differences which give each European country a distinct identity, while strengthening the bonds that bind Europe together. According to Macon Benoit, European football underwent a massive transformation during the World War II era (1933–45). The game's sharp rise in popularity came at a time of high political intensity, leading to football's politicization. Benoit writes that during this period, European football began to embody four main characteristics: 1) an agent of international relations, in the sense that the foreign policies of European nations became articulated in matches; 2) a source of political propaganda, as football was used to build national pride and establish the legitimacy of political movements; 3) a tool for social pacification; football gave people a place to focus their energy that was not political, and 4) an avenue for protest; mass gatherings at matches gave spectators a forum for the expression of identity and political sentiments. European football stadiums have assumed other roles as places of refuge and sites of political uprisings and terrorist attacks. As European politics and relations have changed, football has remained a global means of political expression.

Three former footballers have led their countries: Ahmed Ben Bella, George Weah, and Kaj Leo Johannesen. Ben Bella played briefly for Marseille during the mid-1940s before leading Algeria in the aftermath of its war of independence, first as prime minister and then as president. Weah, who played football for 18 years in Africa and Europe, was an unsuccessful candidate for the Liberian presidency in 2005 before his election in 2017. Johannesen, who played in goal four times for the Faroe Islands national football team during the 1990s, became prime minister of the Faroe Islands in 2008. Other footballers who have sought high political office include Albert Guðmundsson (who finished third in the 1980 Icelandic presidential election) and Oleg Malyshkin, who finished fifth in the 2004 Russian presidential elections.

== Clubs and political identity ==
Some clubs have a fan base which is religious, right- or left-wing, nationalist, unionist, or autonomist.

=== England ===
Although many clubs do not have a fixed political identity, some clubs have clear leanings. According to YouGov statistics, supporters of Sunderland lean left and often sing "The Red Flag" during marches. The hooligan firm Seaburn Casuals, on the other hand, is known for its far-right associations. When 26 Seaburn Casuals hooligans were arrested in a police raid before the 1998 FIFA World Cup, some were found to be involved with neo-Nazi groups such as Combat 18. In contrast, according to YouGov statistics, supporters of Crystal Palace and West Ham lean right, with the latter being one of the most conservative clubs in the Premier League.

Clubs such as Chelsea and Millwall are known to have many right-wing and far-right fans, and fans have chanted racist chants at games before. Despite Millwall having many right-wing fans, the club has a long-standing working-class culture, however, working-class urban voters in the United Kingdom (along with several other countries) are traditionally left-leaning and tend to support social democracy and trade unionism.

Some non-league clubs have been adopted by fans that are vocally opposed to racism, homophobia and other forms of discrimination. Examples include Clapton and Dulwich Hamlet. A breakaway from Clapton FC, named Clapton Community, have based their away shirt on the flag of the Spanish Second Republic, supported the October 2020 Polish protests, and reached out to refugees and LGBT people to feel welcome at football.

=== Germany ===
Perhaps one of the most socially progressive football fans in the world are the fans of Hamburg-based club St. Pauli. Most St. Pauli supporters lean to the left or far-left of the political spectrum and describe themselves as anti-racist, anti-sexist, anti-fascist and pro-LGBT rights. St. Pauli fans have been known for taking vocal, prominent stances on social and political issues that affect minorities, oppressed peoples, and the working class. Due to accusations of genocide of Palestinians, many St. Pauli supporters have openly stood in solidarity with Palestine, as well as condemn Israeli atrocities. Others have remained neutral (criticising Israel, Benjamin Netanyahu and Hamas), additionally few actively support Israel.

In recent times, Bayern Munich fans have been described as left-leaning, while their Der Klassiker rivals Borussia Dortmund have historically been right-leaning.

Non-league side Chemnitzer FC has an active right-wing and far-right supporter group, who are reportedly quite influential. In contrast, supporters of non-league side SV Babelsberg 03 are traditionally left-leaning.

=== Indonesia ===
In Indonesia, one of the most successful clubs in Indonesian football Persipura Jayapura is considered to represent Papuan identity and it could be said to be one of the symbols of the campaign and struggle for Papuan separatism. In several matches, the flag of the Republic of West Papua, which is considered separatist by the Indonesian government, was flown several times. In fact, one of the players, Edward Junior Wilson, who comes from Liberia, was involved in a fight with the Indonesian police because he thought he was flying the West Papua flag. This happened in the deciding match 2016 Indonesia Soccer Championship A at Mandala Stadium, Jayapura on 18 December 2016. At that time, Persipura, who managed to become champion after beating PSM Makassar 4–2, celebrated their victory after the match. Edward also raised the national flag of Liberia, However, because it was raining at the time, the police mistook the flag he was flying and there was a flag-pulling action with him. After the incident, the police revealed the misunderstanding that had occurred. This incident also sparked a riot between fans and police at the stadium.

For some Acehnese, Persiraja Banda Aceh is also considered to represent their Acehnese identity and the Free Aceh Movement. In other cases, Persib Bandung is considered to represent the identity of Sundanese and West Java, especially the Priangan area and by some people it has been considered as their Sundanese culture. By critical people, Persib is analogous to a symbol of resistance to Indonesian centrism which focuses on Jakarta (this is also related to its rivalry with Persija Jakarta). Persib is also considered "the national team of Bandung people", in fact the level of attendance at the stadium for Persib is higher than for the Indonesia national team when they play in Bandung. Low audience attendance for the Indonesian national team in Bandung this is also the background by sweeping actions and abuse carried out by rival supporters, The Jakmania against Bobotoh (the name for Persib supporters) when the Indonesian national team played in Jakarta, one of them was the attack on the capo of the Indonesian national team, who was also a Bobotoh on 28 October 2018 at Gelora Bung Karno Main Stadium by 30 to 50 The Jakmania members. In 2022, a video showed the removal of a banner supporting the Indonesian national team at Sidolig Stadium in Bandung. In the video, the man who carried out the takedown said to the video viewer in Sundanese and English "Eweuh timnas, this is Persib!" ("There is no national team, this is Persib!"). This incident occurred during Indonesian national team training at the stadium.

=== Israel ===
The Israeli club Beitar Jerusalem has far-right, Zionist and racist associations. Beitar fans have engaged in anti-Arab and anti-Muslim racist behavior. Fans have supported restricting Arabs and Muslims from joining the club. Arab and Muslim players from other clubs have often experienced racist and other offensive behavior. It remains the only Israeli Premier League club never to have had an Arab player (due to opposition by right-wing, racist fans). Some of Beitar's owners said they were ready to sign a worthy Arab player, but backed down when fans sent threats. When two Russian Muslims were signed in 2013, Beitar fans violently rioted over the decision. Beitar's supporter group, La Familia, has been condemned for its further extremism. The controversial group has been penalized a number of times for anti-Arab chanting and slogans in and outside the stadium. La Familia has an extensive Mizrahi Jewish identity, and some right-wing Israeli politicians have aligned themselves with the group. The club has been condemned for not doing enough to address these issues. Beitar's chief rival is Hapoel Tel Aviv, known for its left-wing leanings, and politics is the main impetus for their rivalry. Fans of the clubs often clash violently.

=== Italy ===
In Italy, the Derby della Capitale in Rome is often characterized by political tension. Some of Lazio's ultras used swastikas and fascist symbols on their banners, and they have engaged in racist behavior during the derbies. At a derby during the 1998–99 season, some Laziali unfurled a 50-meter banner which read, "Auschwitz is your town, the ovens are your houses". Black players from A.S. Roma have often experienced racist and other offensive behavior. During the late 1970s, Lazio developed a strong rivalry with Pescara Calcio. The far-right Lazio ultras consider A.S. Livorno Calcio and Atalanta, both with strong left-wing leanings, to be among their ideological antagonists. Livorno also clashes with opposing right-wing supporter groups, especially those of Inter Milan and Verona. Lazio player Paolo Di Canio and his Livorno counterpart, Cristiano Lucarelli, have given controversial, ideological salutes to fans during matches, with Di Canio giving a Roman salute (nationalism) and Lucarelli giving a raised fist.

=== Northern Ireland and Scotland ===
One of the largest and oldest football rivalries is the Old Firm Derby between the Scottish clubs Celtic and Rangers. The competition between the two clubs is rooted in more than a sporting rivalry; it has as much to do with Northern Ireland as Scotland, as seen in the flags, cultural symbols, and emblems of both clubs. It was infused with a series of complex disputes centred on religion (Catholic and Protestant), Northern Ireland-related politics (loyalism and republicanism), national identity (British or Irish-Scots), or social ideology (conservatism and socialism). Although most Rangers and Celtic supporters are not actively sectarian, serious incidents sometimes occur and the actions of a minority dominate the headlines. The Old Firm Derby fueled many assaults on Derby days, and some deaths have been directly related to the aftermath of Glasgow Derby matches. An activist group which monitors sectarian activity in Glasgow has reported that on Glasgow Derby weekends, violent attacks increase nine-fold above normal levels. An increase in domestic abuse can also be attributed to Glasgow Derby matches.

=== Spain ===
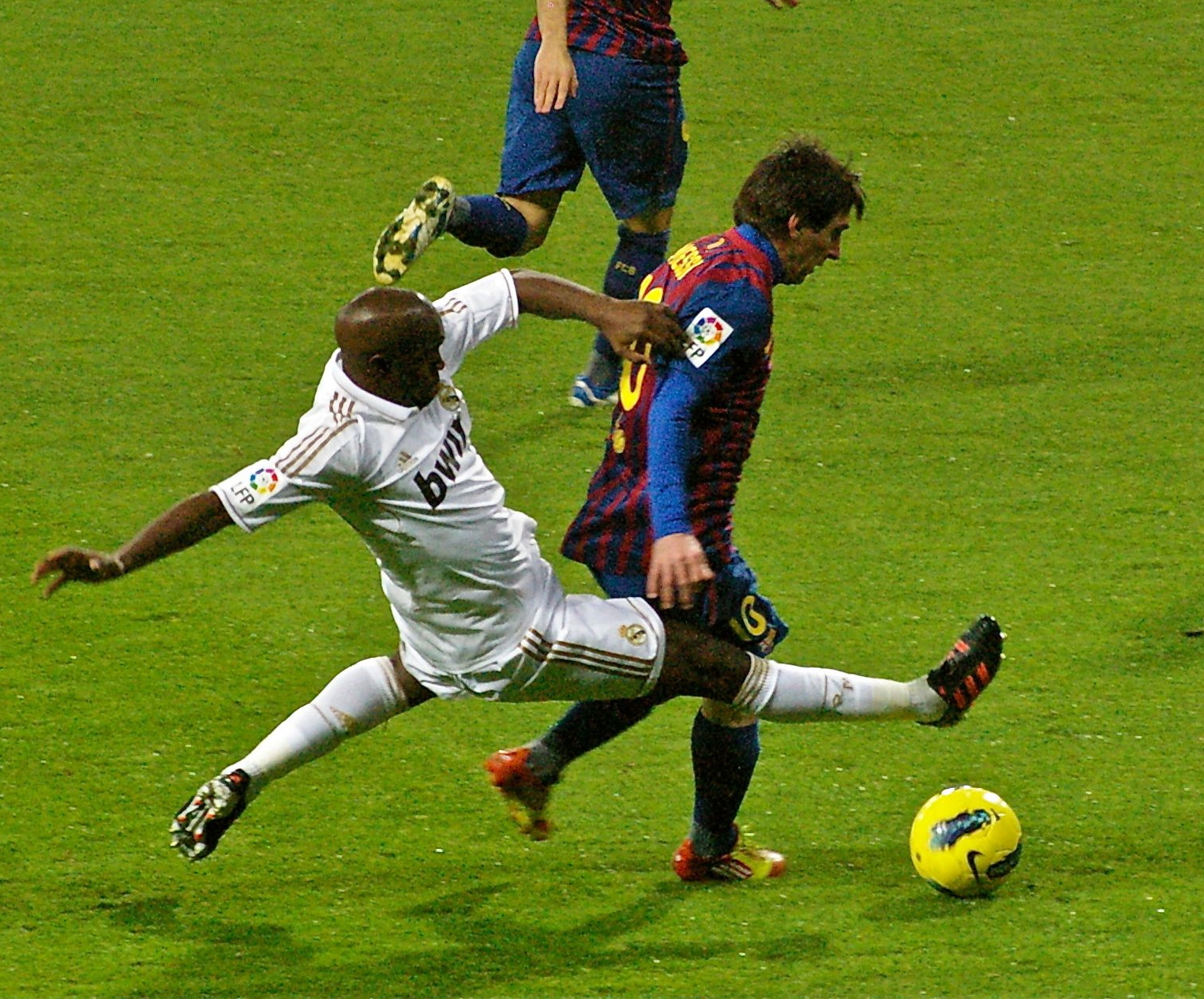
An El Clásico match

Many of the Spanish football rivalries outside the local derbies involve politics (ideological or geographical). The term morbo (roughly translating as morbid fascination and antagonism) has been used to describe attitudes to the complex network of identities and relationships between Spanish clubs. An informal system of alliances and enmities exists across the nation's hooligan groups, based on their political allegiance; the most prominent may be between Atlético Madrid's right-wing followers and the left-wing group attached to Sevilla. Sevilla is locally perceived as the middle-class club in the Seville derby, in contrast to working-class Real Betis. The largest ultras groups who follow Real Madrid and Barcelona (the two clubs in Spain's most famous rivalry, El Clásico) are right-wing. The hostility between them springs from their profiles as the symbolic representatives of Castile and Catalonia, which escalated under the Madrid-based ruling fascist regime of Francisco Franco during the mid-20th century and continued into the 21st, with many Barcelona supporters visibly sympathetic to the Catalan independence movement. As a result, the team is met with anger by other clubs' fans when they visit. Barcelona's claimed position as the persecuted team in their relationship with Madrid contrasts with their city rivalry with Espanyol, who are aligned towards Spanish unionism and whose owners see Barça as the club unfairly favored by Catalonian lawmakers. Real Madrid's rivalry with Athletic Bilbao, a team in the Basque region, involves differences in culture and ideology; its competitive element has diminished in an era of global exposure and recruitment, however, due to Athletic's policy of using local players to emphasize pride in their origins.

== International level ==
A number of matches have ended in disputes and skirmishes.

=== El Salvador and Honduras ===
The most infamous combination of politics and sport was the Football War between El Salvador and Honduras. Although the build-up to the war involved socioeconomic issues such as immigration and land reform, its impetus was hostility by rioters during the second North American qualifying round for the 1970 FIFA World Cup. Disturbances broke out during the first game in Tegucigalpa, and the second leg saw the situation worsen in San Salvador. Honduran fans were roughed up, the Honduran flag and national anthem were insulted, and the emotions of both nations ran high. In retaliation, violence against Salvadoran residents in Honduras (including several vice-consuls) increased. An unknown number of Salvadorans were killed or injured, and tens of thousands began to flee the country. The press of both countries contributed to a climate of near-hysteria and, on June 27, 1969, an attack against Honduras. The Organization of American States negotiated a cease-fire which took effect on July 20, with Salvadoran troops withdrawn in early August.

=== Muslim and Arab World boycotting Israel ===
Israel was one of the founding members of the AFC (Asian Football Confederation) after it became independent in 1948; before then, it played as Mandatory Palestine/Eretz Israel. After Israel's tense 0–1 loss to Iran in the final of the 1974 Asian Games in Iran, Kuwait and other Arab countries refused to play them. Expelled from the confederation, Israel spent several years trying to qualify for the OFC (Oceania), before eventually joining UEFA (Europe) officially.

=== Falkland Islands ===
In the 1986 Mexico World Cup, after the Falklands War between Argentina and the United Kingdom, Argentina and England met in the quarter-finals and Diego Maradona scored both goals in a 2–1 victory for the South Americans. Maradona attributed his first goal to the hand of God; his second goal has been called the Goal of the Century, and he said that the win was revenge for Argentina's defeat in the Falklands.

=== Iran and the United States ===
At the 1998 FIFA World Cup in France, Iran recorded their first World Cup victory in the second game; they defeated the United States 2–1, with Hamid Estili and Mehdi Mahdavikia scoring the Iranian goals. Although tension was expected because of each country's political stance, both sides presented one another with gifts and flowers and stood together for a photograph before the match.

=== Indonesia ===
Since the beginning of Indonesia's independence, football has been used as a political campaign tool by the Orde Lama government. Indonesia at that time was known for its political alignment with the Soviet Union and China. Various actions with political nuances often occur in Indonesian football, starting from refusing to compete with the Israeli national team in the 1958 FIFA World Cup qualification because of his solidarity with Palestine and do not want to violate the country's basic constitution. To the point of not recognizing Taiwan, and prohibiting it from participating in the 1962 Asian Games together with Israel being banned. Indonesia was also involved in military confrontation with Malaysia from 1963 to 1966 which stemmed from opposition to the establishment of the Federation of Malaya which will incorporate Sabah and Sarawak into its parts because they are considered puppet states and remnants of British imperialism in Southeast Asia. Then this hostility also spread to football with matches always running hotly and there is almost always a commotion between players and supporters when the two teams compete. Recently, the Indonesian government also rejected the Israeli U-20 national team who will play in the 2021 FIFA U-20 World Cup in Indonesia after qualifying. The Governor of Central Java, Ganjar Pranowo and Governor of Bali, I Wayan Koster officially announced their rejection. Indonesia's status as host was revoked by FIFA after this incident.

=== Japan and China ===
The 2004 AFC Asian Cup in China made headlines due to events during the final between China and Japan, apparently because of relations between the countries dating back to the World War II era which included the Nanjing Massacre. As the Japanese national anthem was played, home fans expressed anti-Japanese sentiment by drowning out the anthem with chants. Chinese fans booed the players, visiting fans, and officials as Japan defeated China 3–1, rioting after the match outside the Beijing Workers' Stadium.

=== Iraq ===
Despite ethnic dilemmas in their country, Iraq won the 2007 AFC Asian Cup. After a previous-round win, Iraqi military spokesman Qassim Moussawi said that they wanted to stop "terrorists, Sunni extremists, and criminals from targeting the joy of the people." Iraqi president Jalal Talabani said that it was disappointing that they could not celebrate at home with the fans. Many, however, hailed the victory as a show of unity; according to Iraq's coach, Jorvan Vieira, "This is not just about football ...this is more important than that ...This has brought great happiness to the whole country. This is not about a team, this is about human beings." Saudi coach Hélio dos Anjos said, "Iraq deserved to win today ...They were very motivated and we knew the whole world was supporting this team."

=== Armenia and Turkey ===
On 6 September 2008, Armenia and Turkey again faced each other in a 2010 FIFA World Cup qualification match in Yerevan. Turkish president Abdullah Gül was invited to watch the match, and he and his Armenian counterpart Serzh Sargsyan sat together behind bullet-proof glass. The Turkish national anthem was almost drowned out by booing from 35,000 Armenian fans, however, indicating continued mistrust between the countries. However, the gesture "between the presidents showed that they believed 'football diplomacy' had achieved the most important result." This was a first for the countries, which have been divided after the dissolution of the Ottoman Empire.

=== France and Ireland ===
In 2009, France and the Republic of Ireland met in the 2010 FIFA World Cup qualification play-off; the winner of the two-legged tie progressed to the 2010 FIFA World Cup in South Africa. After a 1–1 aggregate draw, the match went into extra time at France's National Stadium. The winning goal came from France's William Gallas, but Thierry Henry twice handled the ball before passing to Gallas to score. It was called a "hand of Frog" goal, referring to Diego Maradona's "hand of God" goal in the 1986 World Cup match between Argentina and England. It then became an international incident with Irish Taoiseach Brian Cowen demanding a replay and the French President (Nicolas Sarkozy) telling him to "stick to politics".

=== Iran and the UAE ===
In 2010, relations between Iran and the United Arab Emirates took a turn for the worse when the Football Federation Islamic Republic of Iran sent a letter to the Asian Football Confederation complaining about the misuse of the Persian Gulf name. "The move was made after the UAE misrepresented the name Persian Gulf during a match between Iran's Sepahan and the UAE's Al Ain. The Emirate television displayed various banners showing a fictitious name for the Persian Gulf during the match between Iran's Sepahan and the UAE's Al Ain. In addition to comments from the UAE comparing the three disputed islands (Greater and Lesser Tunbs and Abu Musa, held by Iran) to the occupation of Palestine, calls were made to downgrade ties. This also comes after the Islamic Solidarity Games, to be held in Iran, were canceled over the dispute of the Persian Gulf label.

=== Gibraltar and Spain ===
For the UEFA European Championship qualification, Gibraltar and Spain cannot be drawn together because of the disputed status of Gibraltar. The same rule is in place for Azerbaijan and Armenia because of poor relations between two countries, and it was imposed for Russia and Georgia after the 2008 Russo-Georgian War. However, it was lifted for the Euro 2016 tournament when Gibraltar and Spain agreed to play each other again.

=== Hungary and Romania ===
The national teams of Hungary and Romania are longtime rivals, as the two countries are neighbours and had numerous conflicts through history. The first official match between the two teams dates back to 1936. Due to the general tension of the matches between the two teams and the numerous fan incidents resulting from the general feeling of antipathy between the two countries, it can be considered one of the most bitter rivalries of the football world.

== Footballer politicians ==
Footballer politicians
Name	Country	Team(s)	Political post	Comments	Ref.
Camille Dimmer	Luxembourg	Luxembourg (1957–1964)	Member of the Chamber of Deputies of Luxembourg (1989–1994); General Secretary of the Christian Social People's Party (1990–1995)		
Pelé	Brazil	Santos (1956–1974); New York Cosmos (1975–1977); Brazil (1957–1971)	Extraordinary Minister of Sport (1995–1998)		
Mustafa Mansour	Egypt	Egypt; Al-Ahly; Referee; General Secretary of CAF (1958–1961)	Government minister		
Ahmed Ben Bella	Algeria	Olympique Marseille (1939–1940)	Prime Minister of Algeria (1962–1963); President of Algeria (1963–1965)		
George Weah	Liberia	Liberia; Paris Saint-Germain; A.C. Milan	Presidential candidate in the 2005 Liberian general election Senator; President of Liberia (January 2018 – 2024)		
Don Rossiter	England	Leyton Orient	Mayor of Rochester, Kent		
Garan Fabou Kouyate	Mali	Referee			
Albert Guðmundsson	Iceland	Arsenal; Racing Club; A.C. Milan	Candidate in the 1980 Icelandic presidential election Member of the Althing; Minister of Finance; Minister of Industry; Ambassador to France	Father of Ingi Björn Albertsson	
Ingi Björn Albertsson	Iceland	Iceland	Member of the Althing (1987–1995)	Son of Albert Guðmundsson	
Oleg Blokhin	Soviet Union, Ukraine	Soviet Union; Dynamo Kyiv	Member of the Parliament of Ukraine		
Carlos Bilardo	Argentina	San Lorenzo de Almagro; Deportivo Español; Estudiantes	Buenos Aires Province Secretary of Sports		
József Bozsik	Hungary	Hungary; Budapest Honvéd FC	Member of the National Assembly of Hungary (1953–1957)		
Toshiro Tomochika	Japan	Ehime FC	Diet of Japan (2007–present)		
Danny Jordaan	South Africa		Member of the Parliament of South Africa (1994–1997)		
Randy Horton	Bermuda	Bermuda; New York Cosmos	Member of the Parliament of Bermuda (1998–present)		
Éric Di Meco	France	France; Marseille			
William Clegg	England	England; Sheffield Wednesday	Lord Mayor of Sheffield (1898)		
Roberto Dinamite	Brazil	Brazil; Vasco da Gama	State Assembly of Rio de Janeiro (1994–present)		
Romário	Brazil	Brazil	Senate of Brazil (2010–present)		
Bebeto	Brazil	Brazil; Deportivo La Coruña			
Gianni Rivera	Italy	Italy; A.C. Milan	Member of the Chamber of Deputies of Italy (1994–2001); Undersecretary for Defense (2000–2001); Member of the European Parliament (2005–2009)		, ,
Kakha Kaladze	Georgia	Georgia; Dinamo Tbilisi; Dynamo Kyiv; A.C. Milan; Genoa C.F.C.	Minister of Energy; Deputy Prime Minister of Georgia; Mayor of Tbilisi		
José Francisco Cevallos	Ecuador	Ecuador; Barcelona SC; Once Caldas; Deportivo Azogues; LDU Quito	Ecuadorian Minister of Sports (2011–present)		
Roman Kosecki	Poland	Poland (1988–1995)	Member of the Sejm of the Republic of Poland (2005–2019)		
Roman Pavlyuchenko	Russia	Russia; Tottenham Hotspur	Member of Stavropol regional council		
Kaj Leo Johannesen	Faroe Islands	Faroe Islands	Prime Minister of the Faroe Islands		
Titi Camara	Guinea	Guinea; Saint-Étienne; Lens; Marseille; Liverpool; West Ham United; Al-Ittihad; Al-Siliya; Amiens	Minister of Sport		
Detlef Irrgang	Germany	Energie Cottbus	Councillor in Cottbus for the CDU		
Zico	Brazil	Brazil	Minister of Sport (1990)		
Lawrie McKinna	Scotland, Australia	Kilmarnock	Mayor of the City of Gosford (2012–present)		
Alistair Edwards	Australia	Australia (1991–1997)	Councillor of City of Cockburn (2000–2005)		
Hakan Şükür	Turkey	Turkey; Sakaryaspor; Bursaspor; Galatasaray; Torino; Inter; Parma; Blackburn Rovers	Member of the Grand National Assembly of Turkey (2011–2015)		
Marc Wilmots	Belgium	Belgium (1990–2002); Belgium manager (2012–2016); Sint-Truiden; Mechelen; Standard Liège; Schalke 04; Bordeaux	Member of Belgian Senate (2003–2005)		
Thomas Bodström	Sweden	AIK (1987–1989)	Minister for Justice (2000–2006)		
William Kennedy Gibson	Northern Ireland	Ireland (1894–1902); Irish League XI (1894–1902); Cliftonville (1892–1903); Sunderland (1902); Bishop Auckland (1902); Sunderland Royal Rovers (1903)	Member of Belfast City Council (1909–Unknown), 1929 Northern Ireland general election candidate		
Oleg Malyshkin	Russia	Torpedo Taganrog; Uralan Elista	Head of Tatsinsky District (1997–2001), Chief of Staff of the Liberal Democratic Party of Russia (2001–2003), Member of the Liberal Democratic Party of Russia State Duma (2003–2007), 2004 Russian presidential election candidate		
Jack Komboy	Indonesia	Indonesia (2004–2005); Persipura (1999–2003, 2004–2010); PSM (2003–2004)	Member of Papua provincial council (2009–present)		
John Rawlinson (politician)	United Kingdom	England (1882); Old Etonians; Cambridge University	Conservative Member of Parliament for Cambridge University, elected 1906		
Jim Platt	United Kingdom	Northern Ireland (1976–1986); Middlesbrough (1971–1983); Ballymena United (1973–1985)	Elected to Middlesbrough Council in Kader ward, representing the Middlesbrough Independent Councillors Association, 2019 to the present.		
Timo Furuholm	Finland	Finland (2010–2013) FC Jazz (2003) Musan Salama (2004) Inter Turku (2005–2011; 2017–2021) Fortuna Düsseldorf (2012–2013) Hallescher FC (2013–2016)	Elected to Turku City Council in 2021; elected to Finnish Parliament in 2023 as a member of the Left Alliance. Wife is Minja Koskela, the leader of the Left Alliance.		

== Political views of association footballers ==
Many association footballers have openly spoken about their political views, and some have even endorsed political candidates.

=== Brazil ===
In the lead-up to the 2018 Brazilian presidential election, many Brazilian footballers openly endorsed right-wing and socially conservative candidate Jair Bolsonaro, then a member of the Social Liberal Party, who eventually became President. Footballers who endorsed Bolsonaro include Kaká, Felipe Melo, Rivaldo and Ronaldinho. However, other players such as Paulo André and Juninho Pernambucano opposed Bolsonaro.

In the lead-up to the 2022 Brazilian presidential election, several of the Brazil national team players endorsed Bolsonaro for re-election, this time running for the Liberal Party. Players that endorsed Bolsonaro include Alisson Becker, Dani Alves, Lucas Moura, Neymar and Thiago Silva.

Former footballer Walter Casagrande has openly expressed left-leaning political views, and expressed disapproval over the country's national team's yellow jersey being worn by Bolsonaro supporters at his rally. In Brazil, the jersey has become associated with Bolsonarism.

=== France ===
In the lead-up to the 2024 French legislative elections and during the UEFA Euro 2024 in Germany, two players from the France national team, Kylian Mbappé and Marcus Thuram, urged voters not to vote for the right-wing populist and national conservative National Rally, led by Marine Le Pen, who they labelled "extremists". Both Mbappé and Thuram are Black, and the National Rally advocates for less immigration.

=== Spain ===
==== Dani Carvajal ====
Spanish footballer Dani Carvajal has repeatedly been linked to nationalist, right-wing and far-right movements, which have caused controversy. Carvajal has been linked with Spanish right-wing parties Vox and (more recently but to a lesser extent) Se Acabó La Fiesta through likes and comments on Instagram posts.

Following Spain's victory at the UEFA Euro 2024, when Carvajal shook hands with Spanish Prime Minister Pedro Sánchez, a member of the centre-left Spanish Socialist Worker's Party (PSOE), Carvajal refused to look Sanchez in the eyes.

In 2024, following Donald Trump's victory in the 2024 election, Carvajal liked an Instagram post by Vox leader Santiago Abascal, who is a supporter of Carvajal's club Real Madrid, congratulating Trump on returning to office.

=== United Kingdom ===
In the lead-up to the 2019 United Kingdom general election, footballers Harry Arter, Hector Bellerin and Gary Lineker all criticised the centre-right Conservative Party, but did not explicitly endorse any other party. Bellerin is an outspoken critic of Brexit. On the other hand, pundits and former players Jamie Carragher and Gary Neville both endorsed the centre-left Labour Party.

=== United States ===
==== Megan Rapinoe ====
Perhaps the most politically active soccer player in the United States is Megan Rapinoe, a former player who played for the United States national team and who spent most of her career at Seattle Reign (formerly known as Reign FC and later OL Reign). Politically, Rapinoe is a leftist and a progressive, and she has advocated for many socially progressive causes, particularly in relation to LGBT rights, gender equality, feminism, racial equality and abortion rights.

Rapinoe endorsed progressive Democrat Elizabeth Warren in the 2020 Democratic Party presidential primaries, and hosted a panel with frontline workers at the 2020 Democratic National Convention. She endorsed Joe Biden for the 2020 presidential election, and even offered to be his nominee Vice President. Rapinoe has repeatedly criticised Donald Trump during his first presidency. Rapinoe was one of the first athletes to congratulate Biden on his victory in 2020.

After Biden dropped out of the 2024 presidential election, Rapinoe, alongside former basketball player Sue Bird, endorsed Biden's successor as Democratic nominee, Vice President Kamala Harris, for the 2024 presidential election, and was excited about Harris potentially being the first woman and the second Black person to become President of the United States.

== See also ==
- William Kennedy Gibson
- Nationalism and sport
- Politics and sports
- Oleg Malyshkin
