= Nicolau Brondo Trophy =

- Organiser(s): CD Atlético Baleares
- Founded: 1966; 60 years ago
- Region: Palma, Balearic Islands
- Teams: 2
- Current champions: CE Andratx (1st title)
- Most championships: CD Atlético Baleares (30 titles)
- Website: https://www.atleticobaleares.com/

The Nicolau Brondo Trophy (Spanish: Trofeo Nicolás Brondo) is a pre-season football tournament organised by Club Deportivo Atlético Baleares (Palma, Balearic Islands, Spain) since 1966. The trophy serves as the official presentation of the first team before the start of the season.

== History ==
The tournament was created in memory of the journalist former Nicolau Brondo Ferrer (1920–1965), habitual follower and chronicler of the team who died prematurely.

It has been played continuously every summer, except in the years 1976 (it was not organized), 1988 (reseeding the lawn), 2006 (installation of artificial turf), and 2020 (COVID-19 pandemic). Nor was it played in 1990 because of the water trickle that fell in Palma and the inability to find dates throughout the season to be played.

The trophy has traditionally been played in a single game, except four times (1977, 1992, 1995 and 1998) in which semifinals and final were played. Atlético Baleares has always been present in the dispute of his trophy, except on two occasions (1992 and 1995) in which the team fell in the semifinals when it has been played with four teams.

It was played at the Estadi Balear since 1966 until the stadium was closed in 2013. After was played at the Magaluf Municipal Sports Center (Calvià) (2013), Son Malferit (2014-2019) and again Estadi Balear (since 2021). It is currently the oldest trophy of these characteristics played in the Balearic Islands.

== List of champions ==
Year	Ed.	Champion	Score	Runner-up	Other comments
1966	1st	Atlético Baleares	1–1 (pp)	CE Sabadell	One match
1967	2nd	Atlético Baleares	1–0	CD Constancia	One match
1968	3rd	CE Europa	1–0	Atlético Baleares	One match
1969	4th	SD Ibiza	2–1	Atlético Baleares	One match
1970	5th	Atlético Baleares	2–1	SD Ibiza	One match
1971	6th	Real Mallorca	1–0	Atlético Baleares	One match
1972	7th	Real Mallorca	4–1	Atlético Baleares	One match
1973	8th	SD Ibiza	0–0 (pp)	Atlético Baleares	One match
1974	9th	Atlético Baleares	1–1 (pp)	UD Poblense	One match
1975	10th	Atlético Baleares	2–1	CD Margaritense	One match
1976	11th	CE Europa	2–0	Atlético Baleares	One match
1977	12th	Atlético Baleares	5–1	UD Poblense	Semifinalists, CD Margaritense and CD Murense
1978	13th	SD Ibiza	2–0	Atlético Baleares	One match
1979	14th	Atlético Baleares	2–2 (pp)	CE Espanya	One match
1980	15th	Atlético Baleares	1–0	CD Manacor	One match
1981	16th	CD Santanyí	2–1	Atlético Baleares	One match
1982	17th	CD Calvià	2–1	Atlético Baleares	One match
1983	18th	CD Badia Cala Millor	3–1	Atlético Baleares	One match
1984	19th	Real Mallorca	1–0	Atlético Baleares	One match
1985	20th	Real Mallorca	2–1	Atlético Baleares	One match
1986	21st	CD Constancia	2–2 (pp)	Atlético Baleares	One match
1987	22st	Atlético Baleares	2–0	UD Poblense	One match
1988	It was not disputed by the reseeding of the lawn on the pitch before the start of the season
1989	23nd	Atlético Baleares	4–2	CD Manacor	One match
1990	––	Atlético Baleares–CF Platges de Calvià			Suspended because of a heavy rain storm
1991	24th	Atlético Baleares	7–0	Son Roca At.	One match
1992	25th	CD Ferriolense	1–1 (pp)	Real Mallorca	Semifinalists, Atlético Baleares and Son Roca At.
1993	26th	CD Ferriolense	1–1 (pp)	Atlético Baleares	One match
1994	27th	Real Mallorca	1–1 (pp)	Atlético Baleares	One match
1995	28th	CD Constancia	0–0 (pp)	CF Sóller	Semifinalists, Atlético Baleares and CF Platges de Calvià
1996	29th	Atlético Baleares	1–0	CF Sóller	One match
1997	30th	Atlético Baleares	1–1 (pp)	CF Sóller	One match
1998	31st	Atlético Baleares	4–1	CD Ferriolense	Semifinalists, CD Génova and CD Soledad
1999	32nd	Atlético Baleares	4–1	CD Santa Ponsa	One match
2000	33rd	CD Constancia	3–2	Atlético Baleares	One match
2001	34th	Atlético Baleares	1–1 (pp)	Real Mallorca B	One match
2002	35th	CD Santa Ponsa	1–0	Atlético Baleares	One match
2003	36th	CD Binissalem	2–1	Atlético Baleares	One match
2004	37th	Atlético Baleares	2–1	CD Ferriolense	One match
2005	38th	Real Mallorca B	3–0	Atlético Baleares	One match
2006	Not played over the installation of artificial turf before the season
2007	39th	Atlético Baleares	1–1 (pp)	Real Mallorca B	One match
2008	40th	Atlético de Madrid B	0–0 (pp)	Atlético Baleares	One match
2009	41st	Nigeria Sub-20	4–0	Atlético Baleares	One match
2010	42nd	Atlético Baleares	1–1 (pp)	Celta de Vigo B	One match
2011	43rd	Atlético Baleares	2–1	UD Las Palmas	One match
2012	44th	Atlético Baleares	7–0	Mallorca selection	One match
2013	45th	Atlético Baleares	1–0	CF Platges de Calvià	One match
2014	46th	Atlético Baleares	6–1	CE Mercadal	One match
2015	47th	Atlético Baleares	3–0	Santa Catalina At.	One match
2016	48th	Atlético Baleares	1–0	CD Constancia	One match
2017	49th	Atlético Baleares	4–0	CD Santanyí	One match
2018	50th	Atlético Baleares	4–0	CE Esporles	One match
2019	51st	Atlético Baleares	0–0 (pp)	UD Poblense	One match
2020	Not played over the health crisis of COVID-19 pandemic
2021	52nd	Atlético Baleares	5–0	CD Manacor	One match
2022	53rd	CD Ibiza Islas Pitiusas	2–0	Atlético Baleares	One match
2023	54th	Atlético Baleares	0-0 (pp)	Hércules CF	One match
2024	55th	Atlético Baleares	0-2	CE Andratx	One match

(pp): resolved in the penalty shootout

== Titles by club ==
- 30 trophies: Atlético Baleares (1966, 1967, 1970, 1974, 1975, 1977, 1979, 1980, 1987, 1989, 1991, 1996 to 1999, 2001, 2004, 2007, 2010 to 2019, 2021, and 2023)
- 5 trophies: Real Mallorca (1971, 1972, 1984, 1985 and 1994)
- 3 trophies: SD Ibiza (1969, 1973 and 1978) and CE Constància (1986, 1995 and 2000)
- 2 trophies: CE Europa (1968 and 1976) and CD Ferriolense (1992 and 1993)
- 1 trophy: CE Santanyí (1981), CD Calvià (1982), CD Badia Cala Millor (1983), CD Santa Ponsa (2002), CD Binissalem (2003), Real Mallorca B (2005), Atlético de Madrid B (2008), Nigeria Sub-20 (2009), SD Ibiza Islas Pitiusas (2022), and CE Andratx (2024)

== Sources ==
- AAVV: Gran Enciclopèdia de Mallorca. 19 Vol. Palma: Promomallorca edicions, 1988–91. ISBN 84-86617-02-2 (in Catalan)
- García Gargallo, Manuel: «El Atlético Baleares, patrimonio del fútbol balear (y mallorquín)». Cuadernos de Fútbol. Núm. 76 (May 2016). CIHEFE. ISSN 1989-6379 (in Spanish)
- Salas Fuster, Antoni: L'Atlètic Baleares. Una història de supervivència. Palma: Ingrama SA (impr.), 2009. ISBN 84-85932-78-1 (in Catalan)
