= Viña Lapostolle =

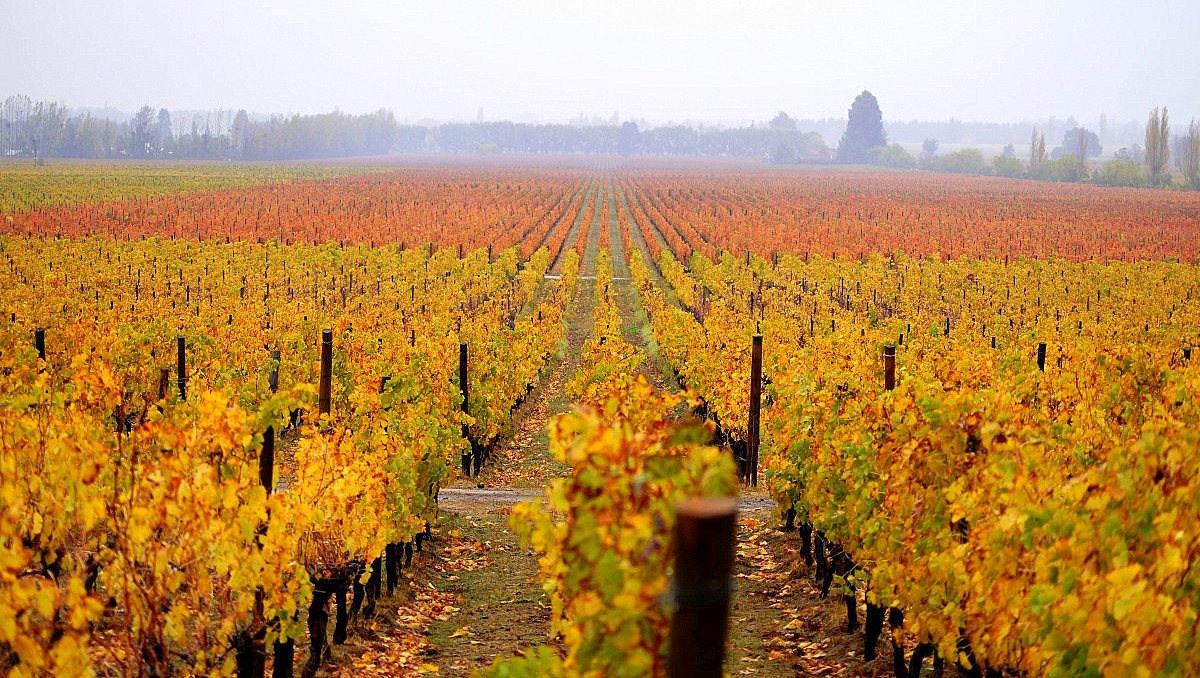
- Location: Apalta Valley, Chile
- Appellation: Colchagua Valley
- Founded: 1994 (30–31 years ago)
- Key people: Founders: Alexandra Marnier-Lapostolle; Cyril de Bournet
- Acres cultivated: 914
- Cases/yr: 200,000
- Known for: Clos Apalta, Lapostolle Le Blanc, Lapostolle Le Rosé, Cuvée Alexandre, Borobó
- Website: lapostollewines.com

Viña Lapostolle is a Chilean wine company, founded by Alexandra Marnier-Lapostolle and Cyril de Bournet in 1994. Alexandra Marnier-Lapostolle is great-granddaughter of Jean-Baptiste Lapostolle, early founder of French cognac company Grand Marnier. The winemakers of Lapostolle are: Andrea León, Jacques Begarie and Michel Rolland. In 2021, it had 370 hectares of cultivated vines, located in the Colchagua, Casablanca and Cachapoal valleys, which produced around 200,000 cases per year, distributed in 60 countries.

== Awards and honours ==
International:

- 100 points Lapostolle Clos Apalta blend for the vintage 2014, according to ranking by the international taster James Suckling:
  - 48% Carmenère, 31% Cabernet Sauvignon and 21% Merlot.
- 100 points Lapostolle Clos Apalta blend for the vintage 2015, according to ranking by the international taster James Suckling:
  - 46% Carmenère, 30% Cabernet Sauvignon, 19% Merlot and 5% Cabernet Franc.
- 100 points Lapostolle Clos Apalta blend for the vintage 2017, according to ranking by the international taster James Suckling:
  - 48% Carmenère, 26% Cabernet Sauvignon, 25% Merlot and 1% Petit Verdot.
- 6º best vineyard in the world in 2019, for Lapostolle Clos Apalta, according to William Reed Business Media.
