= CD Atlético Baleares =

Spanish football team

Coordinates: 39.569511°N 2.680102°E

Atlético Baleares
- Full name: Club Deportivo Atlético Baleares, S.A.D. Club Esportiu Atlètic Balears, S.A.E. (in Catalan)
- Nicknames: Los Balearicos; Blanc-i-Blaus (White-and-Blues)
- Short name: ATB, Baleares
- Founded: 20 November 1920; 105 years ago as Baleares Football Club
- Stadium: Estadi Balear
- Capacity: 6,000
- President: Ingo Volckmann
- Head coach: Luis Blanco
- League: Segunda Federación – Group 3
- 2025–26: Segunda Federación – Group 3, 2nd of 18
- Website: www.atleticobaleares.com
| Home colours | Away colours | Third colours |

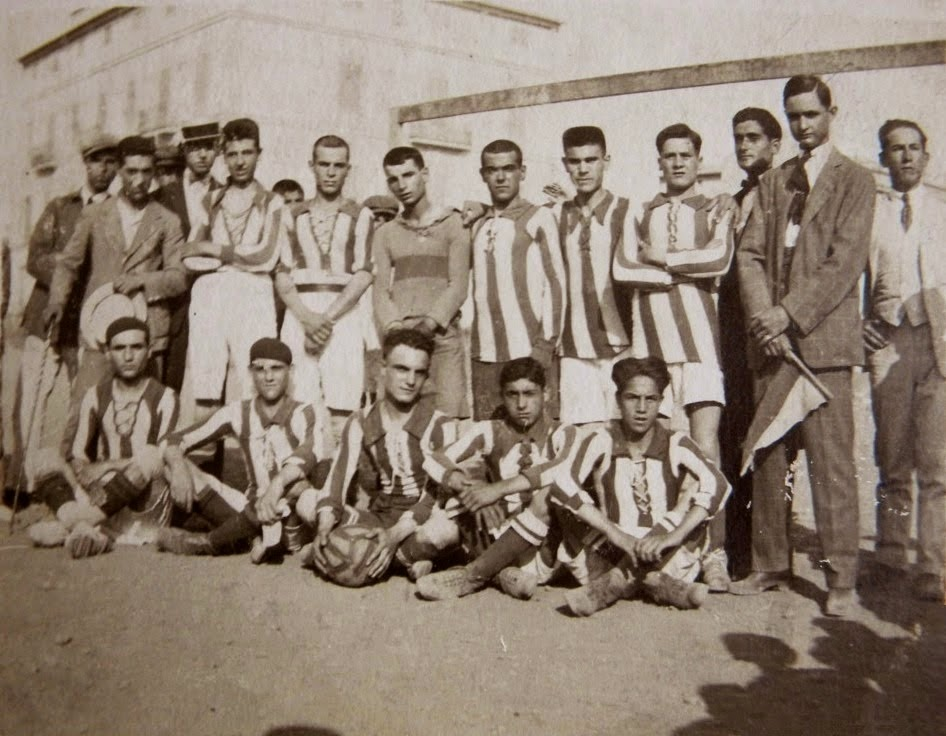
Baleares FC, July 1921.

Club Deportivo Atlético Baleares, S.A.D. (Catalan: Club Esportiu Atlètic Balears) is a Spanish football team based in Palma, the capital of the island of Mallorca, in the autonomous community of the Balearic Islands. Founded in 20 November 1920, its first men's team currently plays in Segunda Federación, the fourth tier of Spanish football, hosting games at the Estadi Balear with a capacity of 6,000 seats. Its first women's team is active in the Segunda Federación, the third division, playing at Son Malferit. Besides, its youth academy has around a dozen of teams.

Atlético Baleares reached the Segunda División, the second tier, on two occasions, participating for a total four seasons in the 1950s and 1960s. Moreover, it disputed 16 seasons of the extinct Segunda División B, claiming the title on three occasions, and 3 seasons of the Primera Federación. Still, Atlético Baleares has most often been present in the Tercera División.

Its origins are related to the working class of Palma, and already in the 1920s, Atlético Baleares became the main rival of RCD Mallorca, the island's most successful club. This rivalry, commonly dubbed the Palma derby, has stayed alive until the present, despite the low number of direct confrontations during the last decades.

Atlético Baleares was known as Baleares FC until 1942, when it adopted its current name after a fusion with Athletic FC. Still, many fans call the club by its old name.

== Name ==
=== Development ===
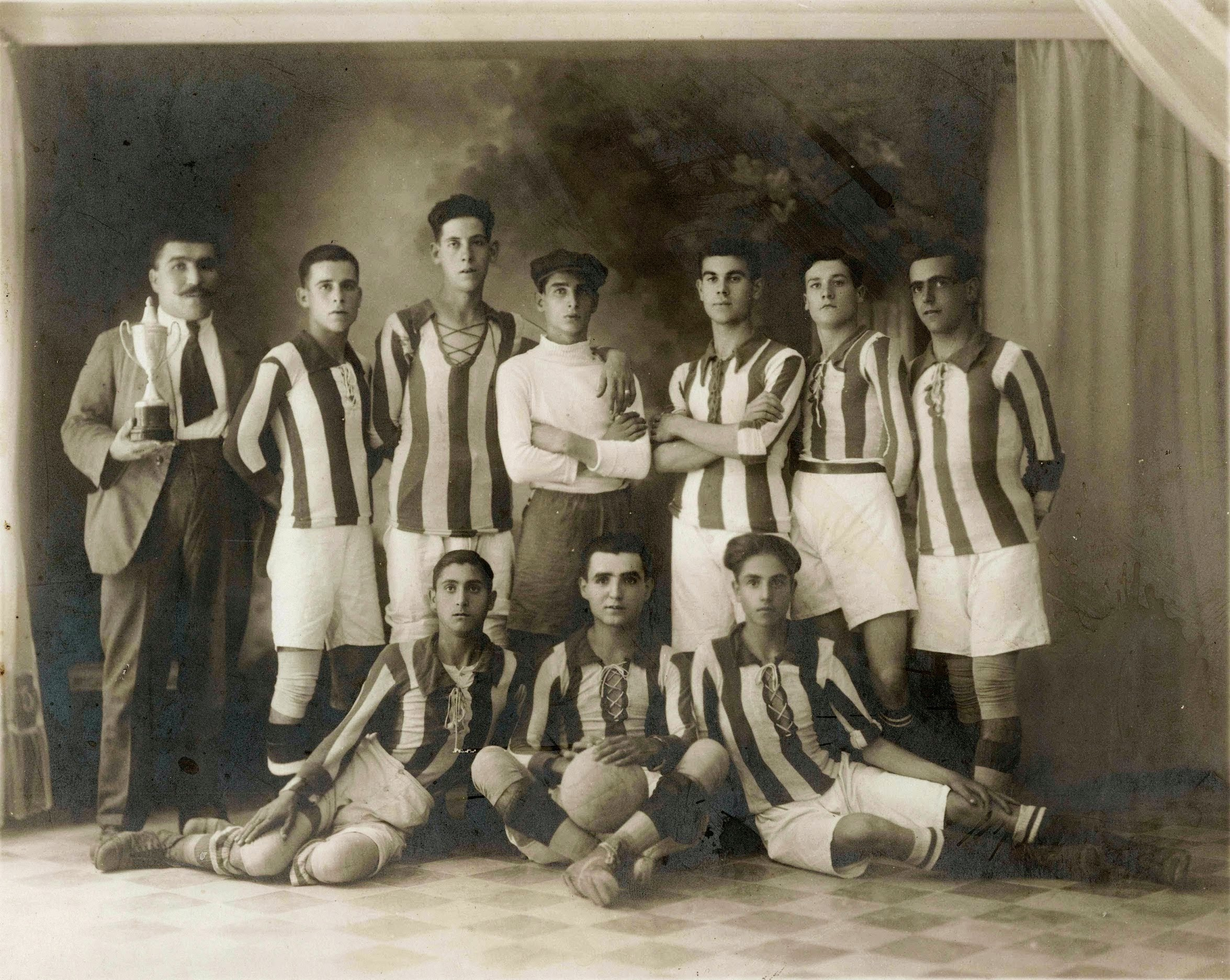
Baleares FC (sept. 1921).jpg

- Baleares Football Club (1920–1940)
- Club de Fútbol Baleares (1940–1942)
- Club Deportivo Atlético-Baleares (1942–1943)
- Club Deportivo Atlético Baleares (1943–2012)
- Club Deportivo Atlético Baleares, SAD (2012–present)

=== Current usage ===
For decades, there have colloquially been two ways to refer to the club: Atlético Baleares, the club's complete name, and Baleares, the club name until the fusion with Athletic FC in 1942. The usage of the latter name can be explained with an important nuance regarding that fusion: the identity of Baleares was maintained, which meant that the fusion was popularly experienced as an absorption process of Athletic by Baleares. This is also why Atlético Baleares is widely acknowledged as a continuation of Baleares.

Moreover, there exists a second nuance when it comes to the choice of which name to use for the club. Mallorca is an island where two languages coexist: the local variety of Catalan, the original language, and Spanish, the dominant language. Still, Catalan is the vernacular language among many inhabitants and the most used language among supporters of Atlético Baleares. In Catalan, the club is referred to as Atlètic Balears or simply Balears, while Atlético Baleares and Baleares are the Spanish denominations. The most used name among the supporters is Atlètic Balears.

== Symbols ==
=== Hymn ===
The music and lyrics of the hymn of Atlético Baleares are composed by Pere Cladera. Originally sung in Spanish, the Catalan version (1996) is made by Rafel Pericàs Ballester and is the version that is still used by the club before matches and official acts.

The lyrics of the hymn are the following:

L’equip nostre s’anomena com les Illes, amb elles s’identifica i representa amb honor. Són els nostres els colors de la mar blava com també el de la llum clara de la nostra tradició. És aposta que els grans amb els infants junts suport els hi donam i tots plegats els animam. I així totes les grans gestes recordam per això plegats cantam. L’Atlètic és el més gran. Atlètic, Atlètic, oe, oe, oe. Atlètic, Atlètic, oe, oe, oe. És l’escut que portam damunt el cor allò que més ens motiva a lluitar pel més bo. Entre noltros no hi ha classes socials, l’amor a n’el Balears és l’única condició. Atlètic, Atlètic, oe, oe, oe. Atlètic, Atlètic, oe, oe, oe. Atlètic, Atlètic, oe, oe, oe. Atlètic, Atlètic, l’Atlètic és el millor!

Translation to English:

Our team is named like the Islands; it identifies with these and represents them with honor. Our colors are of the blue sea and the bright light of our tradition. It’s a bet that the adults, together with the children, give support to the players and that everyone encourages them. And this way, we remember all the big gestures, which is why we sing together. Atlètic is the greatest. Atlètic, Atlètic, oe, oe, oe. Atlètic, Atlètic, oe, oe, oe. It’s the crest that we wear on our hearts that motivates us most to fight for the most beautiful. Between us, there are no social classes; our love for Balears is the only condition. Atlètic, Atlètic, oe, oe, oe. Atlètic, Atlètic, oe, oe, oe. Atlètic, Atlètic, oe, oe, oe. Atlètic, Atlètic, Atlètic is the best!

=== Crest ===
The crest used since the fusion between Baleares FC and Athletic FC in 1942 has remained much the same, only undergoing small aesthetic changes over time. Before that moment, Atlético Baleares used a completely different crest.

The superior part is round and has two spikes at the sides. The middle part of the exterior is vertical, and when going down, the sides come together before ending in a point. During the first decades of its existence, the crest had a slightly different shape.

The inside of the crest, laying over a brown ball at the top, consists of three parts that can be divided horizontally:

- The upper part includes a castle or fortification surrounded by a blue sea, white clouds, and a blue sky. This part has undergone some changes over the years, including small changes of colour and shape.
- The middle part consists of a white background with the official name of the club, CD Atlético Baleares, in the middle. This part has also undergone slight variations, from the handwritten name in 1942 to the current font.
- The lower part consists of three blue vertical stripes on a white background, a reference to the club's colours. This part has not undergone any change over the years.

In the 21st century, different versions of the crest with the club's name in Catalan been designed by supporters, but these have never been accepted as official.

=== Kit ===
Since its foundation in 1920, Atlético Baleares has always played in a kit that consists of blue and white vertical stripes. The number, width, and tone of the blue stripes have varied over the years. The colours refer to the logo of Isleña Marítima, the employer of the founding members of Mecánico FC, one of the clubs from which Atlético Baleares was born.

=== Mascot ===
The mascot of Atlético Baleares is Ferreret, an endemic Majorcan midwife toad, named after the Catalan word for the toad. The mascot has been designed by the artist Antoni Bibiloni Palmer, known in the artistic world as Bibi, in the 1990s. Currently, he handed the rights to the mascot to the Atlético Baleares Foundation, which is responsible for administrating and managing its image.

In 2009–10, a new version of Ferreret was presented, which introduced the presence of the mascot at the home matches and official acts. In the 2020s, Ferreret stopped appearing often.

== History ==
For a long time, the history of the club had not been researched, which has only happened in the 21st century. That is why many still trace the origin of the club back to 1942, even though it has been proven and widely accepted that 1920 is the actual foundational year of Atlético Baleares.

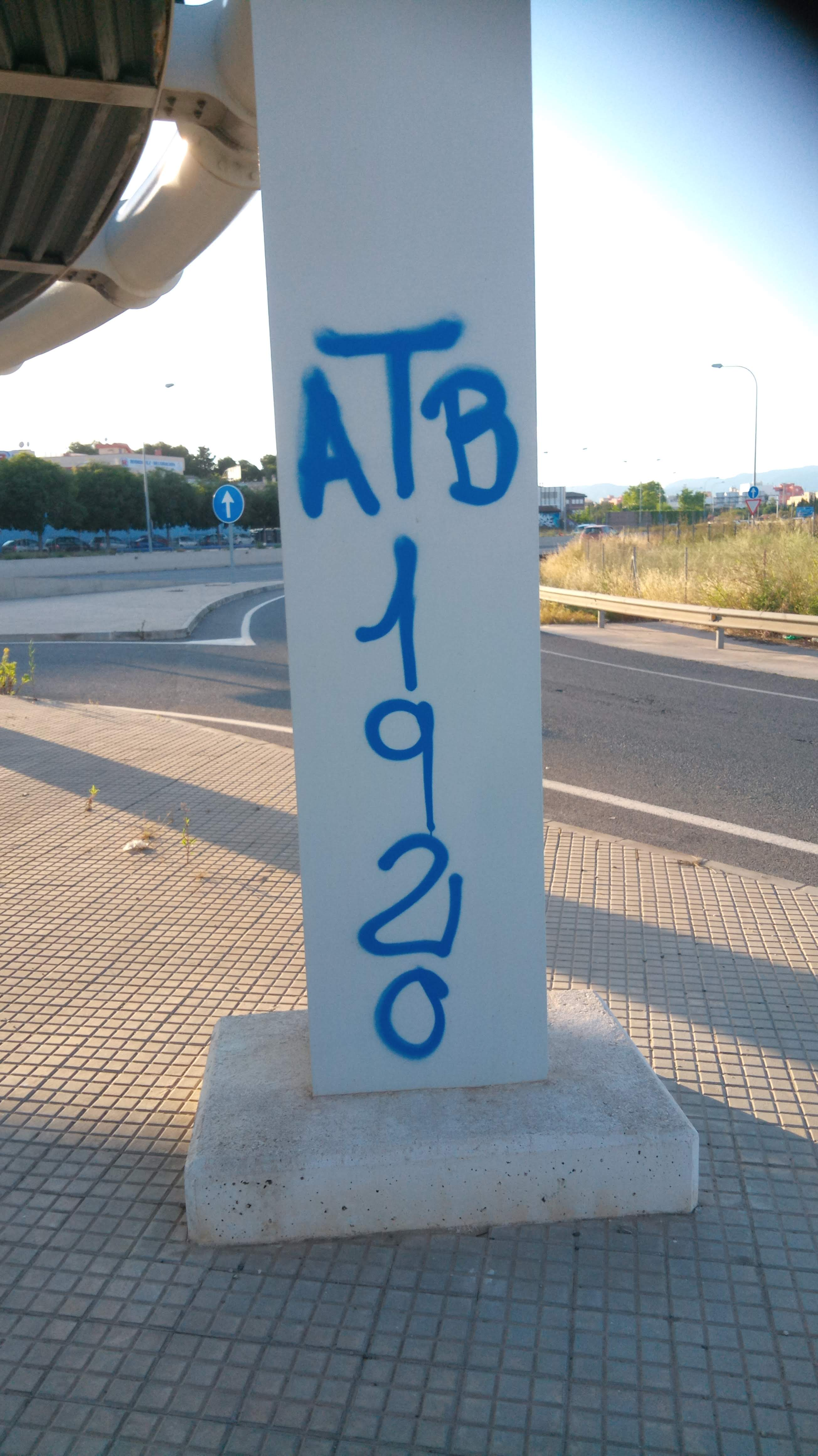
Graffiti of CD Atlético Baleares' abbreviation and its foundational year in Palma, Mallorca.

=== The origins (1920) ===
==== Mecánico FC ====
On 3 April 1920, an article about the foundation of new football teams in Palma appeared in the local newspaper Última Hora. The following sentence stood out in the text:

En los talleres de la Isleña tengo noticias que se hacen preparativos para formar un team (I have news from the Isleña workshops that preparations are made to form a team).

While football used to be a sport for the middle or upper class, this was the first time a working-class group created a football team, concretely a group of workers at Isleña Marítima, complemented by naval machinists that were doing an internship at the company. This team adopted the name of Mecánico FC (in Catalan: Mecànic FC).

Their shirts were based on the colours of the company: three vertical blue stripes on a white background, inspired by the initials I-M on the blue background of the original logo of Isleña Marítima. The workers did not have to spend money on elaborating shorts, as they were able to cut their blue overalls. The members gathered in the café Can Rasca (Carrer de Sant Miquel, 67, which used to be 187, right next to the Carrer dels Oms) in Palma. The team lacked a field and played on an esplanade at the Moll de Palma, very close to the former offices of Isleña Marítima.

==== Fundición Carbonell (or Mallorca FC) ====
In the same edition of the newspaper cited earlier, another phrase stood out:

En la fundición de los señores Carbonell se organiza otro once, que promete ser un terrible rival por la corpulencia de la gente obrera que se alista. (In the foundry of the Carbonell men another eleven is organized, which promises to be a terrible rival for the bulk of the working people who enlist)

A team founded by workers of the Fundición Carbonell, a small metalworking company in the city. The team initially used the same name of the company and subsequently adopted the name Mallorca FC. The team colors consisted of a totally white T-shirt and pants. Mallorca FC had its club house in café Can Meca (Carrer Arxiduc Lluís Salvador, at cornering the Avingudes) in Palma and Carbonell played its games in a field called sa Síquia Reial, located between Avinguda del Comte de Sallent and Carrer Blanquerna in the same city.

=== Birth of Baleares FC (1920) ===
Later in 1920, Mallorca FC left its social premises and moved to Can Rasca, the clubhouse of Mecánico FC. Given their similar work and social class, the members of both clubs got along well and decided to merge to form a more powerful club. Thus, on 14 November or 20 November (depending on the source), a constitutional assembly was held, in which the fusion of Mecánico FC and Mallorca FC was approved under the name Baleares Football Club. The name was unanimously accepted by the attendees, who considered it representative of the social profile of the club. The club house of Baleares remained in the café Can Rasca. The pitch that the new club would use would be that of Mallorca FC, sa Síquia Reial. As for the kit, the white and blue striped T-shirt of Mecánico FC and the white pants of the Mallorca FC were adopted.

The new club debuted on 21 November 1920, winning 5–0 in the Tirador velodrome against Veloz Sport Balear, which was one of the most potent teams at the time.

=== The 1920s and 1930s. Growth and consolidation ===
In 1921, Baleares played its first major tournament: the Copa Ayuntamiento, organized by the Municipality of Palma, and finished second behind RS Alfonso XIII FC (currently known as RCD Mallorca). Afterward, Baleares has been a regular in local competitions.

Soon, a fierce rivalry between those two teams developed, a rivalry that transcended sports. On the one hand, RS Alfonso XIII FC was a team followed and supported by the most well-off classes, as well as by the Spanish monarchists, while on the other hand, Baleares has its origins in the humblest estates and in Republicanism. The rivalry between these teams still exists and is called the Palma derby.

Due to the growth of the club, Baleares moved to the Son Canals Stadium, which opened in 1923 and remained its home for decades. Meanwhile, the club participated in the Regional Balearic Championship, first organized in 1923 by the Catalan Football Federation and since 1926 by the Balearic Islands Football Federation until its disappearance in 1940. Baleares was always in the front line of the competition: it finished as runner-up of the Mallorcan Championship on nine occasions, only surpassed by RS Alfonso XIII FC or CE Constància from Inca. It won the Mallorcan Championship in the 1927–28 season but lost the Balearic Championship final to UD Mahón, the champion of Menorca, by 1–0.

In other competitions, one of the highlights of Baleares was the triumph in the President of the Republic Cup, a tournament played by the top-tier teams of the Mallorcan Championship during the 1933–34, 1934–35, and 1935–36 seasons, with a trophy in dispute awarded by the then-president Niceto Alcalá Zamora. Baleares won the second and third editions and, consequently, the cup in dispute, as teams could obtain the cup if they would win two editions. Some days later, the club was about to participate in the People's Olympiad in Barcelona, which was supposed to be held from 19 to 26 July 1936, but the military uprising by the Francoists impeded the tournament's start and led the players to meet for a friendly in the Republican zone at the start of the Spanish Civil War.

In 1940 the club absorbed Mediterráneo FC, another of the city's main clubs, which would further increase the social mass. That same year, the name Baleares Football Club was changed to Club de Fútbol Baleares, according to the guidelines of the Francoist regime that prohibited the use of other languages besides Spanish, including in names of football clubs.

Baleares played in Primera Regional de Mallorca when, in 1940, the Regional Balearic Championship was transformed into a part of the lower divisions of the Spanish football league system. This, together with other factors, caused the decline of Baleares and almost led to relegation to the Segunda Regional de Mallorca.

=== Fusion with Athletic FC (1942) ===
In 1942, the Palma Council approved an urban planning change that forced another club from Palma, CD Atlético (until 1940 called Athletic FC), to leave its stadium, Sa Punta. The club lacked the resources to build a new stadium and contacted other clubs to discuss a possible merger. First, its directors approached CD Mallorca, but the negotiations failed because CD Atlético wanted the future club to be called CD Atlético-Mallorca, while CD Mallorca did not want any name change. Then, CD Atlético contacted Baleares, with whom they reached an agreement. The fusion agreement was signed on 27 May 1942 and consisted of the following points:

- Modification of the club's name from Club de Fútbol Baleares to Club Deportivo Atlético-Baleares.
- Maintaining the colours of Baleares (blue and white) without any variation of design.
- Maintaining the headquarters and pitch of Baleares, both located in the Son Canals Stadium.
- Assuring equality of members regarding the club of origin, as well as parity in the board of directors.

The agreement was legally embodied as a merger with equality of clubs, but in practice, it was an absorption of CD Atlético by Baleares. Baleares had a much more numerous fanbase, and its working-class essence was imposed on the middle-class origins of CD Atlético. Besides, the new club inherited the rivalry of Baleares with CD Mallorca, even though CD Atlético maintained a more cordial relationship with the city's most potent club. The name CD Atlético was incorporated into the name of the new entity, but the rest of its hallmarks (colours, stadium, and badge) disappeared. Pere Serra Cladera, president of Baleares, was invested president of Atlético-Baleares (called CD Atlético Baleares by 1943) and Francesc Riera Rigo, president of CD Atlético, was appointed vice president.

=== The 1940s. Promotion to the Tercera División ===
The first season of Atlético-Baleares was 1942–43, during which the club played in the Primera Regional. It only was surpassed by CD Mallorca, but both teams still achieved promotion to the Tercera División. For the first time, Atlético Baleares would have to compete with clubs from the Iberian Peninsula, which caused logistical and financial problems. During those years, the league results of Atlético Baleares were mediocre, with the exception of the third place achieved in the 1945–46 and 1946–47 seasons, which gave them access to the playoffs for promotion to Segunda División for the first time.

=== The 1950s. Years of growth ===
In the 1950–51 season, Atlético Baleares was crowned champion of the Tercera División. The club participated in the promotion play-off, finished on top, and achieved promotion to the Segunda División for the first time in its history. Atlético Baleares participated two consecutive seasons in the second division and returned to the Tercera División in 1953. In the third division, the team achieved strong results, was league champion in 1955–56, and participated in the playoffs for promotion in 1956, 1957, and 1958, but without returning to the second tier.

Atlético Baleares was flourishing, both regarding the league and the social dimension and decided to construct a new stadium. The capacity of the old Son Canals was not sufficient anymore, and its owners threatened to evict the club, which is why the club approved the project for a new stadium in 1958. The Estadi Balear was inaugurated on 8 May 1960 with a match against Birmingham City FC, which the home team won by 2–0.

=== The 1960s. Years of splendour ===
In 1960–61, Atlético Baleares was crowned champion of the Tercera División again and achieved promotion to the Segunda División. Again, the club stayed two seasons in the second division before dropping to the third tier in 1963. Despite this relegation, Atlético Baleares maintained its considerable potential, given that it consistently finished in the top positions and qualified for the promotion playoffs in 1964, 1965, 1966, and 1968, without success.

=== The 1970s. Institutional and sportive crisis ===
Since the end of the 1960s, the club was economically declining and experienced gradually worse results in the Tercera División, until the 1972–73 season, when the club got relegated to the Regional Preferente. Atlético Baleares recovered its place in the Tercera División in 1974–75, but the subsequent classifications continued to be mediocre.

In 1977, the Segunda Division B, the new third tier, was created, and Atlético Baleares qualified for its first edition. But that season, Atlético Baleares finished bottom of the league and returned to the Tercera División (the new fourth tier), in which it repeated poor classifications. This relegation and the following decline in results led to the disappearance of direct confrontations with RCD Mallorca. The last editions of the Palma derby in the 20th century include numerous friendlies in the Nicolau Brondo Trophy and a match in the 1986–87 Copa del Rey.

=== The 1980s. Flying low and high ===
Disappointing results in the Tercera División continued until a new relegation to the Regional Preferente in the 1980–81 season. Socially and economically, there was chaos at Atlético Baleares, leading the club to remain two seasons in the amateur competition.

After returning to the Tercera División in the 1983–84 season, Atlético Baleares improved substantially and participated in the 1985–86 Tercera División play-off. Despite failing to achieve promotion, the restructuring of the Segunda División B helped the club go up a tier, being its second promotion to this competition.

The team remained three seasons in Segunda Division B: 1987–88, 1988–89 and 1989–90. During the 1988–89 season, the team was very close to finishing on top, a place that would have provided direct promotion to the Segunda División. However, the following season, Atlético Baleares dropped to the Tercera División. Moreover, economic and institutional problems, added to the bad state of the Estadi Balear and the poor assistance to home matches, left Atlético Baleares in crisis.

=== The 1990s. Deceptive stability ===
After returning to the Tercera División in 1990, Atlético Baleares entered a bittersweet dynamic that lasted for more than a decade. The club consistently performed well in the league: between 1990 and 2002, Atlético Baleares qualified in the top four except for one season. Such classifications allowed the club to participate in playoffs for promotion to the Segunda División B. Besides, Atlético Baleares was crowned champions four times, of which three in a row (1998, 2000, 2001, and 2002).

However, the playoffs always ended unsuccessfully. The club disputed it in 1991, 1992, 1994, 1995, 1996, 1997, 1998, 1999, 2000, 2001, and 2002 (eleven times in twelve seasons), but failed every year. In those years, all Balearic teams ended with the same fate when facing teams from the Peninsula because the Balearic group of the Tercera División had a lower level in comparison to other groups, and Atlético Baleares was no exception. This demoralized both the club and the fanbase, which took its toll.

=== The 2000s (I). Sinking and almost disappearing ===
After many failed playoffs, Atlético Baleares entered into a crisis again, fueled by institutional and economic problems. The institutional instability worsened: the relations between the club and Procampo, the community of co-owners of Estadi Balear, worsened. Moreover, players and managers were often let go quickly.

In 2002–03 and 2003–04, the classifications of Atlético Baleares were disappointing, and in 2004–05, the club collapsed. Players did not receive their salaries, and during some matches, there were only eleven players available. The club's youth academy was dismantled, and the institutional friction caused Procampo to prohibit Atlético Baleares from using the Estadi Balear. Atlético Baleares moved to the nearby Germans Escales complex and suffered an inevitable relegation to the Regional Preferente. 2005 is considered one of the darkest years in the history of the club since the entity was about to disappear after 85 years.

=== The 2000s (II). Recovery at all levels ===
Atlético Baleares managed to survive, after which the club entered a dynamic of economic and sportive regeneration. The team was crowned champion of the Regional Preferente in the 2005–06 season and returned to Tercera División. The 2006–07 season was designed as a year of consolidation in this competition, but the team performed well and was close to playing the play-off for promotion to the Segunda División B

In the 2007–08 season, Atlético Baleares aimed for promotion and qualified for the promotion play-off to the Segunda División B. First, AD Universidad de Oviedo was beaten (1–1 in Oviedo and 2–1 in Palma). Then, Atlético Baleares won against SD Gernika Club (0–0 in Gernika and 2–0 in Palma) and achieved promotion to the Segunda División B after 18 years of absence.

The 2008–09 season was a failure, and Atlético Baleares finished bottom of the league and returned to the Tercera División. The 2009–10 season started with again the aim to finish on top and achieve promotion, which it did. In the play-off, Atlético Baleares played CD Tudelano, champion of the Navarrese group of the Tercera División, and won in the Estadi Balear (1–0). Despite losing in the return in Tudela (2–1), the double value of away goals led the club to return to the Segunda División B.

=== The decade of 2010s (I). Consolidation in the league and conversion into SAD ===
Upon returning to the Segunda División B in the 2010–11 season, Atlético Baleares avoided relegation. Another highlight of the season occurred on an institutional level, with the beginning of the club's transformation into a public limited sports company (SAD).

On 5 May 2011, an extraordinary assembly of members approved the conversion of Atlético Baleares into a SAD by a vast majority, with the aim of lifting the club to the Segunda División on short term. During the assembly, the club also announced the purchase of terrains that would accommodate a future sports complex, a project that was never realized. The conversion process in SAD culminated on 27 September 2012 with the first general meeting of shareholders and the election of its first board of directors.

The 2011–12 season was marked by the objective of obtaining promotion to the Segunda División. After an excellent year, Atlético Baleares was proclaimed champion of its group of the Segunda División B. The team disputed the play-off with CD Mirandés for direct promotion but lost the tie (1–0 in Miranda de Ebro and 1–2 in Palma) and entered the second round. Then, the club played CD Lugo, which it could not overcome either (3–1 in Lugo and 0–0 in Palma), amb was eliminated from the play-off.

In 2012–13, Atlético Baleares would continue to strive to reach the Segunda División, but the team played a mediocre season and barely escaped relegation, after which the directors left the club.

The 2013–14 season was planned very differently. The institutional crisis, the departure of the main investors, and the decline in the league table forced Atlético Baleares to reduce its objective, which was to maintain the category. However, the team played a brilliant season and almost qualified for the play-off.

=== The decade of 2010s (II). The Volckmann era, the Copa RFEF, and many playoffs ===
After the main shareholders of Atlético Baleares left the club in 2013, it entered an institutional and economic crisis that even led to its judicial intervention. The situation worsened, and in April 2014, the club entered bankruptcy proceedings. On 5 May, the club faced a decisive shareholders meeting, in which a board of directors consisting of long-time members was elected, who saved the club from disappearing in extremis.

By June 2014, the club came under the control of Ingo Volckmann, a German businessman based in Mallorca, after he acquired 51% of the shareholding package. Thanks to his investments, the club left the bankruptcy proceedings in October of the same year. Since then, the economic stability of the club has been consistent, unlike previous times.

In 2014–15 and 2015–16, with the institutional crisis already resolved and the survival of the club guaranteed, Atlético Baleares finished mid-table without approaching the playoffs. In the latter season, the team performed well in another competition: the Copa RFEF, in which it won the title. After beating many clubs, Atlético Baleares faced CF Rayo Majadahonda in the final and won (2–2 in Majadahonda and 1–0 in Palma), providing the club with the first absolute Spanish title in its history.

The 2016–17 season finished in qualification of Atlético Baleares for the play-off for promotion to the Segunda División. In the first round, Atlético Baleares beat CD Toledo (1–1 in Palma and 1–2 in Toledo), but lost in the second round to Albacete Balompié (1–1 in Palma and 2–1 in Albacete). During the same season, several commemorative events of the 75th anniversary of the merger-absorption of Baleares FC and Athletic FC took place. The main act was a historical exhibition in CaixaForum Palma with a collection of photographs, objects, and trophies of Atlético Baleares, as well as references to the origin of the club in 1920.

During the 2017–18 season, Atlético Baleares could not repeat the results of the previous campaign and avoided relegation on the final matchday. The great incentive of this season was that the main rival, RCD Mallorca, had dropped down to the Segunda División B, which meant the return of the Palma derby after 38 years without league derbies. In Son Malferit, both teams tied (0–0), and in Son Moix, RCD Mallorca won (3–2).

In 2018–19, Atlético Baleares performed better and finished on top of its group. The team disputed the play-off against Racing de Santander, with direct promotion at stake, but lost (0–0 in El Sardinero and 1–1 in Son Malferit) and was forced to play the second round. Atlético Baleares first beat UD Melilla (0–0 in Melilla and 1–0 in Palma) and then lost the final round against CD Mirandés (2–0 in Miranda de Ebro and 3–1 in Palma).

The 2019–20 was promising and started well again. But after matchday 28, on 11 March 2020, the RFEF suspended the competition due to the COVID-19 pandemic, first for two weeks and then indefinitely. On 6 May, the Federation confirmed the completion of the regular league and the dispute of a simplified play-off phase. Atlético Baleares had finished first in the regular league and played the play-off against FC Cartagena, another group champion, in a single match with direct promotion at stake. However, the club lost (0–0 and 4–3 loss after penalties). In the second round, UE Cornellà eliminated Atlético Baleares from the play-off (0–1).

=== The decade of 2020s. Sportive and institutional crisis ===
In 2020, the RFEF announced a restructuring of the Spanish football pyramid due to the COVID-19 pandemic and its consequences. The clubs would be divided into new leagues in the summer of 2021 based on their classifications in the 2020–21 season. The champions of the Segunda División B would achieve promotion to the Segunda División, while the other teams would be divided into two new categories: the Primera Federación (third tier) and the Segunda Federación (fourth tier). The last-placed teams would drop down to the Tercera División, now named the Tercera Federación (fifth tier).

Even though the 2020–21 season was designed for promotion to the Segunda División, Atlético Baleares qualified for the new third division, the Primera Federación. During the following season, the first edition of the Primera Federación, the club aimed for promotion again but failed again and finished mid-table.

Besides the regular league, Atlético Baleares performed extraordinarily well in the 2021–22 Copa del Rey. After beating CD Calahorra (1–1 after penalties), Atlético Baleares beat two clubs from the Primera División: Getafe CF (5–0) in the round of 32 and RC Celta de Vigo (2–1) in the round of 16. Finally, the team was knocked out of the tournament in the last 16 by Valencia CF (0–1). This was the furthest Atlético Baleares had ever progressed in the Copa del Rey.

The 2022–23 season was planned with less budget and, therefore, a theoretically weaker team. The results worsened and led to a total of four different coaches who had led the team during the season. On the last matchday of a chaotic season, Atlético Baleares avoided relegation.

In 2023–24, the club announced a budget reduction again, which was reflected in the quality of the squad. Atlético Baleares experienced a tough season and was relegated to the Segunda Federación five matches before the competition's end.

Parallel to the results of the first team, which were disappointing compared to those obtained during the previous decade, the fanbase of Atlético Baleares decreased, mainly due to the scarce relationship between the ownership of the club and the supporters and the lack of participation of the latter group in the operation of Atlético Baleares. This is a common consequence of transforming a football club into a public sports limited company. These circumstances led to a gradual disaffection and lack of public in the Estadi Balear.

== Season to season ==
=== Mallorca Regional Championship ===
| Season | Tier | Place |
|---|---|---|
| 1923–24 | 1 | 3rd |
| 1924–25 | 1 | 2nd |
| 1925–26 | 1 | 2nd |
| 1926–27 | 1 | 3rd |
| 1927–28 | 1 | 1st |
| 1928–29 | 1 | 3rd |

| Season | Tier | Place |
|---|---|---|
| 1929–30 | 1 | 2nd |
| 1930–31 | 1 | 4th |
| 1931–32 | 1 | 2nd |
| 1932–33 | 1 | 5th |
| 1933–34 | 1 | 2nd |
| 1934–35 | 1 | 2nd |

| Season | Tier | Place |
|---|---|---|
| 1935–36 | 1 | 2nd |
| 1936–37 | 1 | 2nd |
| 1937–38 | 1 | 4th |
| 1938–39 | 1 | 2nd |
| 1939–40 | 1 | 5th |

=== Spanish football league ===
| Season | Tier | Division | Place | Copa del Rey |
|---|---|---|---|---|
| 1940–41 | 4 | 1ª Reg. | 6th | |
| 1941–42 | 3 | 1ª Reg. | 3rd | |
| 1942–43 | 3 | 1ª Reg. | 2nd | |
| 1943–44 | 3 | 3ª | 8th | |
| 1944–45 | 3 | 3ª | 7th | |
| 1945–46 | 3 | 3ª | 3rd | |
| 1946–47 | 3 | 3ª | 3rd | |
| 1947–48 | 3 | 3ª | 8th | |
| 1948–49 | 3 | 3ª | 9th | |
| 1949–50 | 3 | 3ª | 7th | |
| 1950–51 | 3 | 3ª | 1st | |
| 1951–52 | 2 | 2ª | 10th | |
| 1952–53 | 2 | 2ª | 14th | |
| 1953–54 | 3 | 3ª | 7th | |
| 1954–55 | 3 | 3ª | 5th | |
| 1955–56 | 3 | 3ª | 1st | |
| 1956–57 | 3 | 3ª | 2nd | |
| 1957–58 | 3 | 3ª | 2nd | |
| 1958–59 | 3 | 3ª | 3rd | |
| 1959–60 | 3 | 3ª | 2nd | |

| Season | Tier | Division | Place | Copa del Rey |
|---|---|---|---|---|
| 1960–61 | 3 | 3ª | 1st | |
| 1961–62 | 2 | 2ª | 10th | Round of 16 |
| 1962–63 | 2 | 2ª | 14th | |
| 1963–64 | 3 | 3ª | 2nd | |
| 1964–65 | 3 | 3ª | 1st | |
| 1965–66 | 3 | 3ª | 2nd | |
| 1966–67 | 3 | 3ª | 3rd | |
| 1967–68 | 3 | 3ª | 1st | |
| 1968–69 | 3 | 3ª | 5th | |
| 1969–70 | 3 | 3ª | 8th | |
| 1970–71 | 3 | 3ª | 17th | |
| 1971–72 | 3 | 3ª | 10th | |
| 1972–73 | 3 | 3ª | 19th | |
| 1973–74 | 4 | Reg. Pref. | 3rd | |
| 1974–75 | 4 | Reg. Pref. | 1st | |
| 1975–76 | 3 | 3ª | 15th | |
| 1976–77 | 3 | 3ª | 6th | First round |
| 1977–78 | 3 | 2ª B | 20th | Second round |
| 1978–79 | 4 | 3ª | 17th | First round |
| 1979–80 | 4 | 3ª | 13th | Third round |

| Season | Tier | Division | Place | Copa del Rey |
|---|---|---|---|---|
| 1980–81 | 4 | 3ª | 19th | |
| 1981–82 | 5 | Reg. Pref. | 3rd | |
| 1982–83 | 5 | Reg. Pref. | 1st | |
| 1983–84 | 4 | 3ª | 4th | |
| 1984–85 | 4 | 3ª | 3rd | First round |
| 1985–86 | 4 | 3ª | 2nd | Second round |
| 1986–87 | 4 | 3ª | 2nd | Round of 16 |
| 1987–88 | 3 | 2ª B | 12th | |
| 1988–89 | 3 | 2ª B | 6th | Round of 32 |
| 1989–90 | 3 | 2ª B | 20th | |
| 1990–91 | 4 | 3ª | 3rd | Round of 32 |
| 1991–92 | 4 | 3ª | 3rd | |
| 1992–93 | 4 | 3ª | 8th | Second round |
| 1993–94 | 4 | 3ª | 2nd | |
| 1994–95 | 4 | 3ª | 2nd | |
| 1995–96 | 4 | 3ª | 3rd | |
| 1996–97 | 4 | 3ª | 2nd | |
| 1997–98 | 4 | 3ª | 1st | |
| 1998–99 | 4 | 3ª | 4th | |
| 1999–2000 | 4 | 3ª | 1st | |

| Season | Tier | Division | Place | Copa del Rey |
|---|---|---|---|---|
| 2000–01 | 4 | 3ª | 1st | Preliminary |
| 2001–02 | 4 | 3ª | 1st | Preliminary |
| 2002–03 | 4 | 3ª | 8th | Preliminary |
| 2003–04 | 4 | 3ª | 9th | |
| 2004–05 | 4 | 3ª | 19th | |
| 2005–06 | 5 | Reg. Pref. | 1st | |
| 2006–07 | 4 | 3ª | 6th | |
| 2007–08 | 4 | 3ª | 1st | |
| 2008–09 | 3 | 2ª B | 20th | First round |
| 2009–10 | 4 | 3ª | 1st | |
| 2010–11 | 3 | 2ª B | 13th | First round |
| 2011–12 | 3 | 2ª B | 1st | |
| 2012–13 | 3 | 2ª B | 11th | First round |
| 2013–14 | 3 | 2ª B | 5th | |
| 2014–15 | 3 | 2ª B | 12th | First round |
| 2015–16 | 3 | 2ª B | 9th | |
| 2016–17 | 3 | 2ª B | 4th | |
| 2017–18 | 3 | 2ª B | 14th | Second round |
| 2018–19 | 3 | 2ª B | 1st | |
| 2019–20 | 3 | 2ª B | 1st | First round |

| Season | Tier | Division | Place | Copa del Rey |
|---|---|---|---|---|
| 2020–21 | 3 | 2ª B | 5th / 2nd | First round |
| 2021–22 | 3 | 1ª RFEF | 6th | Round of 16 |
| 2022–23 | 3 | 1ª Fed. | 14th | First round |
| 2023–24 | 3 | 1ª Fed. | 19th | |
| 2024–25 | 4 | 2ª Fed. | 2nd | |
| 2025–26 | 4 | 2ª Fed. | 2nd | Round of 32 |
| 2026–27 | 4 | 2ª Fed. | | |

- 4 seasons in Segunda División
- 3 seasons in Primera Federación/Primera División RFEF
- 16 seasons in Segunda División B
- 3 seasons in Segunda Federación
- 53 seasons in Tercera División
- 8 seasons in Regional divisions

== Current squad ==
As of 10 February 2026.

Note: Flags indicate national team as defined under FIFA eligibility rules; some limited exceptions apply. Players may hold more than one non-FIFA nationality.

| No. | Pos. | Nation | Player |
|---|---|---|---|
| 1 | GK | ESP | Pablo García |
| 2 | DF | ESP | Gabriel Ramis |
| 3 | DF | ESP | Iván Serrano |
| 4 | DF | ESP | Jaume Pol |
| 5 | DF | ESP | Marc Lachèvre |
| 6 | MF | ESP | Gerardo Bonet |
| 7 | FW | SEN | Moha Keita |
| 8 | MF | ESP | Jofre Cherta |
| 9 | FW | ESP | Jaume Tovar |
| 10 | FW | ROU | Florin Andone |
| 11 | FW | ESP | Miguelito |
| 13 | GK | ESP | Julián Rivas |
| 14 | FW | ESP | Víctor Morillo |

| No. | Pos. | Nation | Player |
|---|---|---|---|
| 15 | FW | ROU | Darius Fustos |
| 16 | DF | ESP | Hugo Anglada |
| 17 | DF | ESP | Guillem Castell |
| 18 | DF | ESP | Iván López |
| 19 | FW | ESP | Manu Morillo |
| 20 | MF | ESP | Axel Bejarano |
| 21 | MF | ESP | Rubén Bover |
| 22 | MF | GER | Ulrich Taffertshofer |
| 23 | FW | ESP | Juanmi Durán |
| 24 | DF | ESP | Alejandro Pérez |
| 25 | FW | ESP | Álex Pachón |
| 29 | FW | ESP | Adrià Catalá |

=== Reserve team ===
Note: Flags indicate national team as defined under FIFA eligibility rules; some limited exceptions apply. Players may hold more than one non-FIFA nationality.

| No. / Pos. / Nation / Player | No. / Pos. / Nation / Player |

== Staff ==
=== Technical staff ===
| Position | Staff |
|---|---|
| Head coach | (Spain) Luis Blanco |
| Assistant coach | (Spain) Sergio Cano |
| Fitness coach | (Spain) Joan Valentí |
| Goalkeeper coach | (Spain) Marc Antoni Rodríguez |
| Recuperator | (Spain) Carlos Romero |
| Doctor | (Spain) Gonzalo Barrantes |
| Physiotherapist | (Spain) Ricardo Chisaguano |
| Physiotherapist | (Spain) Albert Martín |
| Physiotherapist | (Spain) Xavier Calvo |
| Kit man | (Spain) Joan Torrens |
| Team delegate | (Spain) Jeroni Tegla |

Source: CD Atlético Baleares

== Notable coaches ==
- (Spain) Manuel Cros Grau
- (Spain) Gaspar Rubio
- (Argentina) Gustavo Siviero
- (Spain) Ignacio Martín-Esperanza
- (Spain) Manix Mandiola

== Presidents ==
- Bartomeu Llabrés Albertí (1920–22)
- Jaume Llabrés Morey (1922–23)
- Gabriel Viñas Morant (1923–24)
- Cristòfol Lliteras Tous (1924–25)
- Antoni Miquel Puig (1925–26)
- Josep Jordà Alós (1926)
- Jaume Guasp (1926–28)
- Jaume Perotti Trulls (1928–29)
- Lluís Fiol Alorda (1929–30)
- Jaume Perotti Trulls (1930)
- Antoni Estarellas (1930)
- Jaume Perotti Trulls (1930–31)
- Rafel Estarellas Perelló (1931)
- Josep Ensenyat Alemany (1931–33)
- Damià Adrover PIcornell (1933–36?)
- Joan Serra Mulet (1938?–40)
- Damià Adrover Picornell (1940)
- Pere Serra Cladera (1940–43)
- Josep Ramon Serra (1943–44)
- Francesc Tomàs Cañellas (1944–47)
- Josep Móra Grisol (1947–49)
- Josep Roses Rovira (1949–49)
- Antoni Castelló Salas (1949–52)
- Joan Roca Rubicós (1952–53)
- Gabriel Ferrer Homar (1953–54)
- Gabriel Genovart Riera (1954–58)
- Rafel Vaquer Julià (1958–59)
- Salvador Llopis Lorenzón (1959–60)
- Joan Blascos Serra (1960–62)
- Sebastià Grimalt Riera (1962–64)
- Antoni Mestres Moll (1964–65)
- Fernando Gómez Gómez (1965–66)
- Jaume Planas Ferrer (1966–69)
- Joan Morro Albertí (1969–70)
- Gabriel Genovart Riera (1970–71)
- Jeroni Petro Alemany (1971–72)
- Management commission (1972–73)
- Antoni Mestres Moll (1973–74)
- Management commission (1974)
- Jeroni Petro Alemany (1974–80)
- Modest Subirana Cobos (1980–81)
- Management commission (1981)
- Joan Morro Albertí (1981–84)
- Andreu Amer (1984–85)
- Management commission (1985)
- Damià Estelrich Dalmau (1985–86)
- Bartomeu Planisi Pons (1986–88)
- Ramón Galante Roig (1988–89)
- Management commission (1989–93)
- Josep de la Torre (1993–96)
- Tomàs Cano Pascual (1996–98)
- Miguel Ángel Gómez (1998–2002)
- Josep Jurado (2002–03)
- Miguel Ángel Gómez (2003–05)
- Management commission (2005)
- Damià Estelrich Dalmau (2005–07)
- Fernando Crespí Luque (2007–13)
- Daniel Fiol Lustenberger (2013–14)
- Fernando Crespí Luque (2014)
- Joan Palmer Llabrés (2014)
- Antoni Garau Bonnín (2014–15)
- Ingo Volckmann (2015–)

== Women's team ==
The first women's team of Atlético Baleares plays in the Primera Federación, the second tier of Spanish football. The team plays its matches at Son Malferit. Currently, Atlético Baleares is the leading Balearic women's team.

Atlético Baleares already had a women's team in 1984–85, but that team did not continue after the season. In 2018, the current section was created. Over the years, reserve teams and more youth teams have been created.

== Reserve team and youth academy ==
=== Reserve team ===
Atlético Baleares has had different reserve teams throughout the years. From the 1920s to the 1950s, the club had its own reserve team. In the 1960s, the club had a collaboration with CE Sant Xavier, converting the latter team in the second team of Atlético Baleares. This club had a yellow kit, which is the reason why Atlético Baleares still often picks a yellow kit for its second kit.

Between 1990 and 2000, Atlético Baleares had its own reserve team: Atlético Baleares B, which played in regional categories.

During recent years, the club established collaborations with different Mallorcan teams from the Tercera Federación, first with CE Montuïri (2011) and later with CE Santanyí (2018). The latter club was the reserve team of Atlético Baleares until 2023–24.

=== Youth academy ===
Atlético Baleares maintains a wide youth academy with teams of all ages, of which some are called Atlético Baleares and some Balears FC. The latter is an entity related with and completely integrated into the structure of Atlético Baleares. Moreover, despite the high number of teams, further development of the youth academy has always been impeded by the lack of a sports complex.

== Veterans ==
The Veteran Footballers of Atlético Baleares Association (Associació de Futbolistes Veterans de l'Atlètic Balears) was created on 14 May 2014. The team played its first official game at the Estadi Balear against the veterans of FC Barcelona (1–2) and played more matches ever since.

== Stadium ==
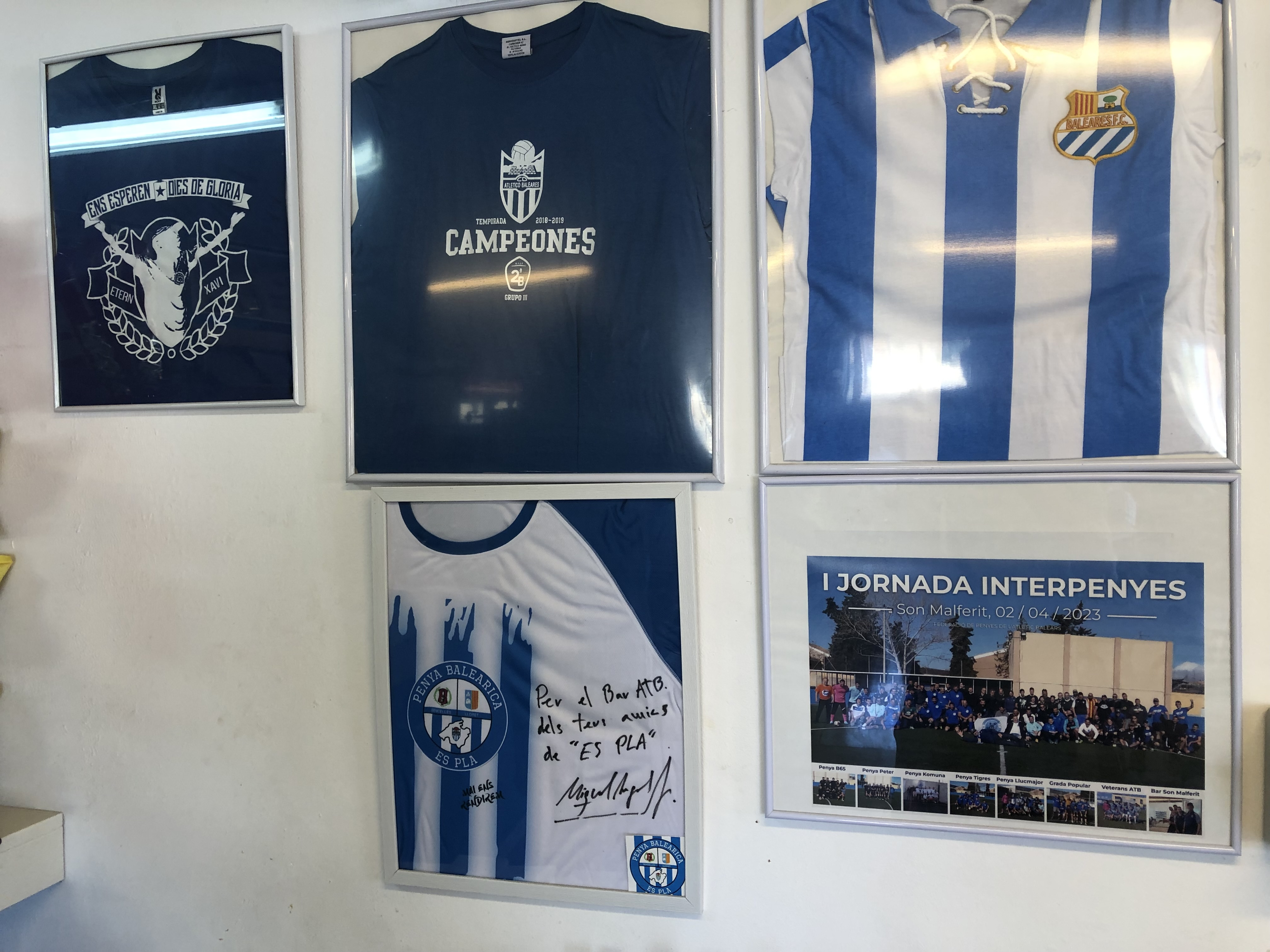
Decorations and shirts of CE Atlètic Balears in the bar of the Estadi Balear.

The Estadi Balear is the home stadium of Atlético Baleares, located in Palma. It was inaugurated in 1960 and closed in 2013 because of its poor maintenance. It was reopened in 2019, has 6,000 seats, and the pitch's dimensions are 102×67 metres. The improvement works of the stadium are still in progress.

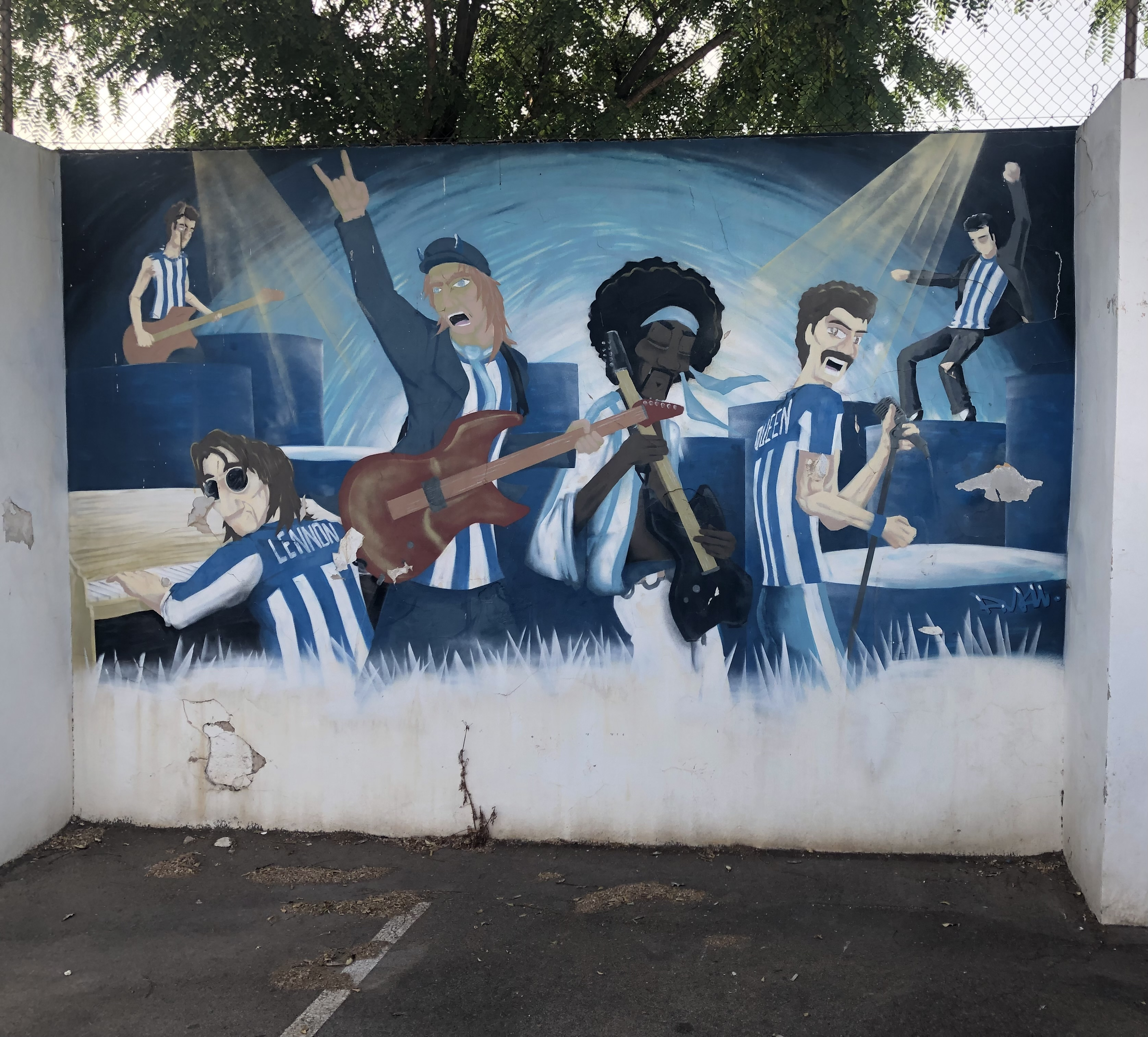
A mural of famous artists wearing a shirt of CE Atlètic Balears on one of the walls of the Camp de Son Malferit.

Previously, the home stadium was the Tirador velodrome (1920–21), Unión-Baleares (1921–23) and Son Canals (1923–60). During the closing of Estadi Balear, the team played in Magaluf (2013–14) and Son Malferit (2014–19).

== Honours ==
=== National tournaments ===
- Segunda División B
  - Winners (3): 2011–12, 2018–19, 2019–20
- Tercera División
  - Winners (11): 1950–51, 1955–56, 1960–61, 1964–65, 1967–68, 1997–98, 1999–2000, 2000–01, 2001–02, 2007–08, 2009–10
  - Runners-up (10): 1956–57, 1957–58, 1959–60, 1963–64, 1965–66, 1985–86, 1986–87, 1993–94, 1994–95, 1996–97
- Regional Preferente
  - Winners (3): 1974–75, 1982–83, 2005–06
- Primera Regional
  - Runners-up (1): 1942–43
- Copa Federación de España
  - Winners (1): 2015–16
- Copa Federación de España (autonomic phase)
  - Winners (2): 2009–10, 2015–16
  - Runners-up (1): 2003–04

=== Regional tournaments ===
- Baleares Regional Championship
  - Runners-up (1): 1927–28
- Mallorca Regional Championship
  - Winners (1): 1927–28
  - Runners-up (9): 1924–25, 1925–26, 1929–30, 1931–32, 1933–34, 1934–35, 1935–36, 1936–37, 1938–39
- Copa Presidente de la República
  - Winners (2): 1935, 1936
- Liga Mallorca
  - Winners (2): 1939, 1943
  - Runners-up (1): 1936

=== Other tournaments ===
- Trofeu s’Agricultura
  - Winners (4): 2007, 2008, 2011, 2014
  - Runners-up (1): 2010
- Uruguay Cup
  - Winners (4): 1959, 1966, 1967, 1968
  - Runners-up (2): 1964, 1965
- Copa Ayuntamiento de Palma
  - Runners-up (1): 1921

=== Friendly tournament ===
Since 1966, the club hosts the Trofeu Nicolau Brondo, the oldest summer tournament in the Balearic Islands. Atlético Baleares has won the competition on 29 occasions.

== Rivalries ==
The main rival of Atlético Baleares is RCD Mallorca, the most potent club from Palma. The clubs meet in the Palma derby.

The rivalry stems from the 1920s when Atlético Baleares (then called Baleares FC) was created by members of the working class of Palma, while RCD Mallorca (then called Real Sociedad Alfonso XIII FC) was created by politically and economically powerful social sectors. Nowadays, though, both clubs are much more heterogeneous than before, but the original identity clash is still very present.

The rivalry has been maintained since the 1920s despite the clubs competing in different categories for many years. From the 1960s onwards and especially since the 1980s, RCD Mallorca has often been present in the Primera División, a competition that Atlético Baleares has never reached.

== Supporter groups and fanbase ==
Peñas (Spanish) or penyes (Catalan) are official supporter groups that promote the support of Atlético Baleares, keep the fanbase together, and organize social initiatives in relation to the club. Since its foundation, Atlético Baleares has always had supporter groups, which were located in different bars throughout Palma. The most popular fan group of the club in the 20th century was Peña Pasaje, located in the homonymous bar (Carrer del Sindicat, 57), active from 1943 to 1971 when the bar shut down. Other important supporter groups were located in the Bar Avenida (in the Avingudes), Bar Vidal (Carrer d'Aragó, 89), Bar Gomila (Plaça de Pere Garau), and Bar Baleares (Carrer d'Aragó, 73). There were also fan groups established in the neighbourhoods of Santa Catalina and El Vivero.

As of September 2024, Atlético Baleares has 2,062 members.

=== Fan Group Federation ===
The Fan Group Federation of Atlético Baleares (Federació de Penyes de l'Atlètic Balears, FPATB), created in 2010, is the federation that unifies most of the current fan groups of Atlético Baleares. The organization functions completely independent from the club. Its main objectives are the following:

- Coordinate the activities of different fan groups.
- Defend the interests of the fan groups and supporters.
- Exchange information about different activities.
- Foment brotherhood between the fan groups and other close organizations.
- Organize and participate in cultural, sports, or recreative activities.
- Plan the cheering during the home and away matches.

In short, the federation aims to promote and maintain the celebration of different club-related activities, as well as help supporters and fan group members with different needs.

=== Fan groups ===
As of 2024, Atlético Baleares has 16 official fan groups, of which 10 form part of the Fan Group Federation. Generally, the fan groups can be divided into three groups: those from Palma, those from Part Forana (the rest of Mallorca), and those from outside the island.

==== Fan groups from Palma ====
- Penya Balearica Marga Fullana
- Penya Balearica Tolo Capellà
- Penya Blanc-i-blava ATB 1942
- Penya blanc-i-blava Blanquerna 65 (to be renamed Penya Blanc-i-blava Bernat Vallori)
- Penya Fanàtiks
- Penya Jogo Bonito
- Penya Komuna Balearika
- Penya Los Tigres
- Penya Peter

==== Other fan groups from Mallorca ====
- Penya Balearica de Cardiff (Santa Ponça)
- Penya Balearica de Llucmajor (Llucmajor)
- Penya Balearica Es Pla (Sencelles)
- Penya Balearica d'Artà – Xavi Ginard (Artà)
- Penya Blanc-i-blava de Llevant (Manacor)

==== Fan groups from outside Mallorca ====
- Peña Balearicos de Corazón (Cartagena)
- Penya Ferreret (Logroño)

== Atlético Baleares Foundation ==
The Atlético Baleares Foundation (Fundació Atlètic Balears) is a non-profit organization related with the club created in 2007. Some years before, there had been several attempts of creating a foundation related to Atlético Baleares, but this was only realized in 2007. Still, the organization has been relatively inactive since its foundation. The most visible and consistent activity has been the visit to sick children in the Son Llàtzer Hospital in Palma during Christmas.

In 2017, the foundation was absorbed by the club and Ingo Volckmann, the club's owner, became its president. The foundation acquired the rights over the Estadi Balear, which allowed the club to start its rebuilding.

== See also ==
- CD Atlético Baleares (women)
- Palma derby
- Estadi Balear
- Nicolau Brondo Trophy
- Margarita Miranda Trophy

== Bibliography ==
- Amengual Salas, Vicenç (2021). Orsai: L'Atlètic Balears. Entre la sociologia i el futbol (in Catalan). Palma: Illa Edicions. ISBN 978-84-122255-4-9.
- Borchers, Liam (2023). The Story of Atlètic Balears. Groningen: Lulu. ISBN 978-1-4717-4271-2.
- Domènech, Joaquim M.; et al. (1959–1960). Boletín informativo: Campo CD At. Baleares (in Spanish). Vol. 1–3. Palma: Bibiloni. DL PM 393–1959.
- Fábregas y Cuxart, Luis (2007). Ca Nostra. 50 años de vida palmesana (in Spanish). Palma: Edicions Cort. ISBN 978-84-7535-595-5.
  - Previous edition: Fábregas y Cuxart, Luis (1965). Ca Nostra. 50 años de vida palmesana (in Spanish).
- García Gargallo, Manuel (2013). Els origens de l'Atlètic Balears (1920–1942). Dels inicis a la fusió (in Catalan). Barcelona: Lulu. ISBN 978-84-09-43355-1.
- García Gargallo, Manuel (2020). L'Atlètic Balears (1920-1942): Els primers anys d'una entitat centenària [Atlètic Balears (1920-1942): The first years of a centenary entity] (in Catalan). Palma: Documenta Balear. ISBN 978-84-18441-08-0.
- Salas Fuster, Antoni (2009). L'Atlètic Baleares. Una història de supervivència (in Catalan). Palma: Ingrama SA (impr.). ISBN 978-84-85932-78-8.
- Salas Fuster, Antoni (2011). L'Atlètic Baleares. La història en imatges (in Catalan). Palma: Ed. Ramon Llull. ISBN 978-84-935664-4-9.
