= Estadio Balear =

Football stadium in Palma, Balearic Islands, Spain

- Interactive map of Estadio Balear
- Location: Palma; Balearic Islands, Spain
- Coordinates: 39.5741°N 2.6775°E
- Owner: Procampo
- Operator: CD Atlético Baleares
- Capacity: 5,500
- Surface: Grass
- Field size: 104 m × 67 m (341 ft × 220 ft)

Construction
- Built: 1959–60
- Opened: 8 May 1960
- Renovated: 2006 and 2018–2019
- Closed: 2013–2019
- Cost: 12 million Ptas
- Architect: Josep Barceló

Tenant
- CD Atlético Baleares (1960–2013, 2019-present)

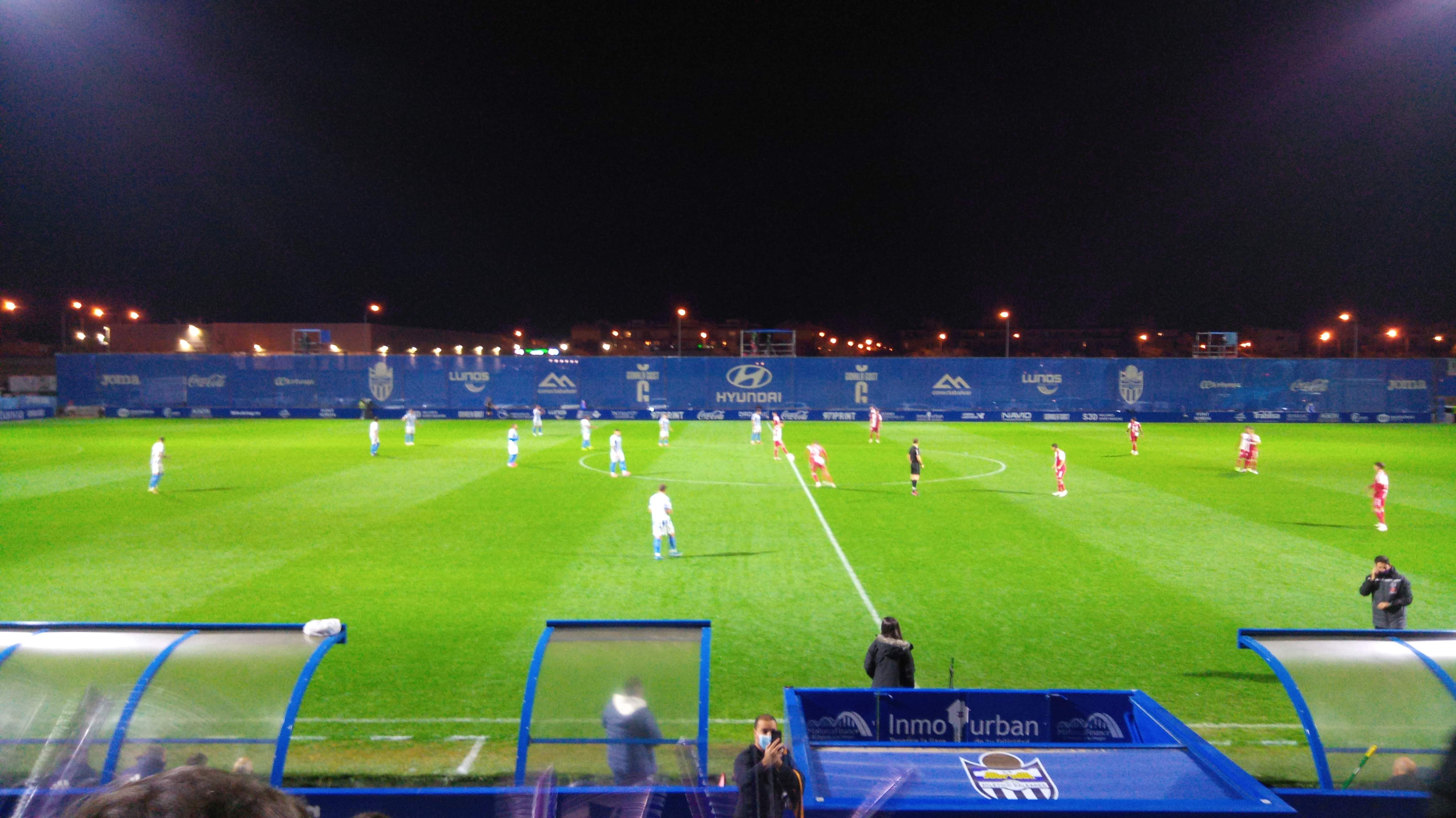
Baleares - Celta 2022 (1).jpg

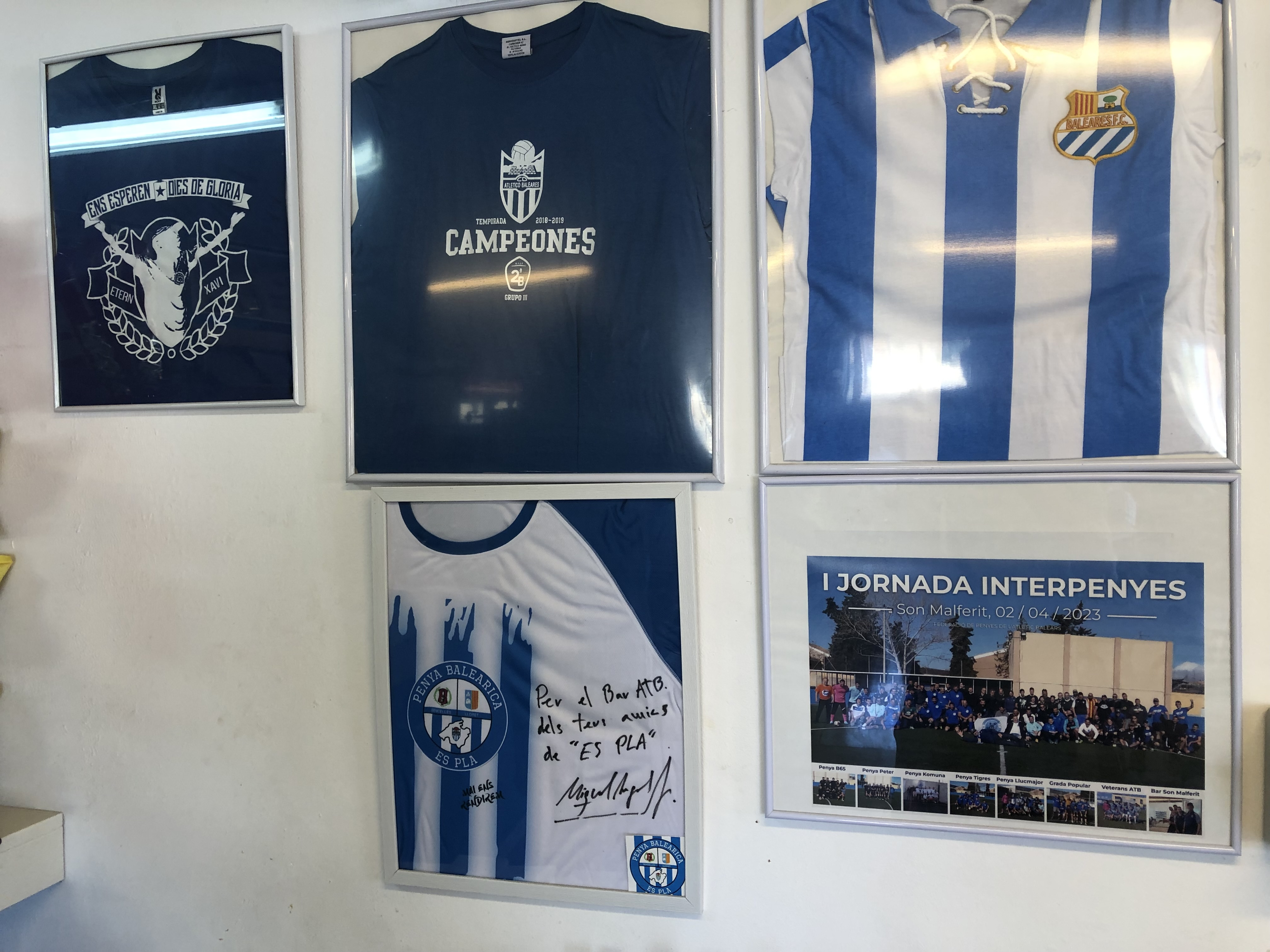
Decorations and shirts of CE Atlètic Balears in the bar of the Estadi Balear.

The Estadio Balear (Catalan: Estadi Balear) is a football stadium located in Palma, Balearic Islands, Spain. Opened in 1960, but closed between 2013 and 2019 on safety grounds, it is the home stadium of CD Atlético Baleares. There is a covered stand with 5,500 seats, and the pitch's dimensions are 104×67 metres.

== History ==
Estadio Balear opened on 8 May 1960, with a 2–0 friendly win against Birmingham City.

On 14 June 2013, the stadium was closed by Palma city council due to a risk of collapse. Four years and a half later, on 14 December 2017, the renovation works started and the capacity of the stadium would be reduced to about 5,500.

During the stadium's closure, CD Atlético Baleares have played home games at the Camp de Son Malferit nearby.

The renovation of the stadium was scheduled to finish in August 2019.

On August 22, 2026, a European American football game took place in Mallorca for the first time at the Estadio Balear. The American Football League Europe held a match between the Rhein Fire and the London Warriors in 2026, dubbed the "Battle at the Beach". Rhein defeated London 40-30.
