= 2000 Tercera División play-offs =

Spanish football league play-offs

The 2000 Tercera División play-offs to Segunda División B from Tercera División (Promotion play-offs) were the final playoffs for the promotion from 1999–2000 Tercera División to 2000–01 Segunda División B. The first four teams in each group (excluding reserve teams) took part in the play-off.

== Format ==
The 68 participating teams were divided into 5 series each made up of 4 groups in the category, with the exception of Series E , which was only formed by Group XII . Each series was divided into 4 groups formed by a 1st, a 2nd, a 3rd and a 4th classified from each group, which played a double-round playoff. Each victory was equivalent to 3 points, the tie to 1 point and the defeat to 0 points. The champion of each group obtained the promotion to Second Division B.

The distribution of each series was as follows:

Series A:

- Group I – Galicia (Galicia (Spain))
- Group II – Asturias
- Group VII – Community of Madrid
- Group VIII – Castile and León

Series B:

- Group III – Cantabria
- Group IV – Basque Country (Basque Country (autonomous community))
- Group XV – La Rioja and Navarre
- Group XVI – Aragon

Series C:

- Group V – Catalonia
- Group VI – Valencian Community
- Group XI – Balearic Islands
- Gruoup XIII – Region of Murcia

Series D:

- Group IX – Eastern Andalusia and Melilla
- Group X – Western Andalusia and Ceuta
- Group XIV – Extremadura
- Group XVII – Castilla–La Mancha

Series E:

- Group XII – Canary Islands

== Teams for 1999–2000 play-offs ==
Group I – Galicia (Galicia (Spain))	Group II – Asturias	Group III – Cantabria	Group IV – Basque Country (Basque Country (autonomous community))	Group V – Catalonia
1st Celta de Vigo B	1st CD Lealtad	1st SD Noja	1st Real Sociedad B	1st CF Balaguer
2nd Deportivo La Coruña B	2nd Club Siero	2nd CD Tropezón	2nd SD Lemona	2nd RCD Espanyol B
3rd UD Xove Lago	3rd Club Marino de Luanco	3rd Racing de Santander B	3rd Arenas de Getxo	3rd CE Mataró
4th CD Lalín	4th AD Universidad de Oviedo	4th CD Miengo	4th SD Eibar B	4th UE Cornellà

Group VI – Valencian Community	Group VII – Community of Madrid	Group VIII – Castile and León	Group IX – E. Andalusia and Melilla	Group X – W. Andalusia and Ceuta
1st CD Onda	1st CD Coslada	1st UD Salamanca B	1st Polideportivo Ejido	1st Algeciras CF
2nd CD Burriana	3rd DAV Santa Ana	2nd La Bañeza FC	2nd CD Linares	2nd CD San Fernando
3rd Benidorm CD	4th RSD Alcalá	3rd CA Bembibre	3rd UD Maracena	3rd Puerto Real CF
4th Alicante CF	5th AD Alcorcón	4th CD Béjar Industrial	4th Almería CF	4th RC Portuense

Group XI – Balearic Islands	Group XII – Canary Islands	Group XIII – Region of Murcia	Group XIV – Extremadura	Group XV – Navarre and La Rioja
1st CD Atlético Baleares	1st UD Las Palmas B	1st Club Olímpico de Totana	1st Mérida Promesas UD	1st Peña Sport FC
2nd CD Constancia	2nd UD Orotava	2nd UD Horadada	2nd CD Don Benito	2nd UDC Chantrea
3rd CD Manacor	3rd UD Vecindario	3rd AD Mar Menor	3rd UP Plasencia	3rd CD Mirandés
4th SCR Peña Deportiva	4th Castillo CF	4th Orihuela CF	4th CF Villanovense	4th CD Logroñés B

Group XVI – Aragon	Group XVII – Castilla–La Mancha
1st UD Fraga	1st UD Puertollano
2nd SD Huesca	2nd Albacete Balompié B
3rd CD Endesa Andorra	3rd CP Villarrobledo
4th UD Barbastro	4th AD Torpedo 66

== Tables and Results ==
=== Group A-1 ===
Pos	Team	Pld	W	D	L	GF	GA	GD	Pts	Qualification or relegation
1	(Galicia (Spain)) RC Deportivo La Coruña B (substituted on)	6	3	2	1	8	5	+3	11	Promoted to Segunda División B
2	(Community of Madrid) CD Coslada	6	3	2	1	15	8	+7	11	
3	(Asturias) Club Marino de Luanco	6	2	3	1	15	7	+8	9	
4	(Castile and León) CD Béjar Industrial	6	0	1	5	5	23	−18	1	

Source: Fútbol Regional

Home \ Away	BEJ	CSL	DEP	MAR
CD Béjar Industrial	—	1–5	0–1	1–1
CD Coslada	6–2	—	0–0	3–2
RC Deportivo B	4–0	2–0	—	1–1
C Marino de Luanco	6–1	1–1	4–0	—

Updated to match(es) played on completed. Source: FutbolMe
Legend: Blue = home team win; Yellow = draw; Red = away team win.

=== Group A-2 ===
Pos	Team	Pld	W	D	L	GF	GA	GD	Pts	Qualification or relegation
1	(Asturias) AD Universidad de Oviedo (substituted on)	6	5	0	1	15	7	+8	15	Promoted to Segunda División B
2	(Galicia (Spain)) RC Celta de Vigo B	6	3	2	1	8	4	+4	11	
3	(Community of Madrid) DAV Santa Ana	6	1	1	4	7	10	−3	4	
4	(Castile and León) CA Bembibre	6	1	1	4	2	11	−9	4	

Source: Fútbol Regional

Home \ Away	BEM	CEL	DSA	UNI
CA Bembibre	—	0–2	1–0	1–5
RC Celta B	0–0	—	2–1	3–1
DAV Santa Ana	2–0	1–1	—	2–4
AD Universidad de Oviedo	2–0	1–0	2–1	—

Updated to match(es) played on completed. Source: FutbolMe
Legend: Blue = home team win; Yellow = draw; Red = away team win.

=== Group A-3 ===
Pos	Team	Pld	W	D	L	GF	GA	GD	Pts	Qualification or relegation
1	(Community of Madrid) AD Alcorcón (substituted on)	6	4	0	2	10	6	+4	12	Promoted to Segunda División B
2	(Asturias) CD Lealtad	6	2	3	1	12	13	−1	9	
3	(Castile and León) La Bañeza FC	6	1	3	2	8	9	−1	6	
4	(Galicia (Spain)) UD Xove Lago	6	0	4	2	9	11	−2	4	

Source: Fútbol Regional

Home \ Away	ACR	BAÑ	LEA	XLA
AD Alcorcón	—	2–0	4–1	2–1
La Bañeza FC	0–2	—	1–1	2–2
CD Lealtad	2–1	3–2	—	2–2
UD Xove Lago	0–1	1–1	3–3	—

Updated to match(es) played on completed. Source: FutbolMe
Legend: Blue = home team win; Yellow = draw; Red = away team win.

=== Group A-4 ===
Pos	Team	Pld	W	D	L	GF	GA	GD	Pts	Qualification or relegation
1	(Asturias) Club Siero (substituted on)	6	4	1	1	10	6	+4	13	Promoted to Segunda División B
2	(Castile and León) UD Salamanca B	6	4	0	2	7	5	+2	12	
3	(Community of Madrid) RSD Alcalá	6	3	1	2	5	4	+1	10	
4	(Galicia (Spain)) CD Lalín	6	0	0	6	4	11	−7	0	

Source: Fútbol Regional

Home \ Away	ACL	LAL	SAL	SIE
RSD Alcalá	—	1–0	1–0	0–1
CD Lalín	1–2	—	0–1	1–3
UD Salamanca B	2–1	1–0	—	2–1
Club Siero	0–0	3–2	2–1	—

Updated to match(es) played on completed. Source: FutbolMe
Legend: Blue = home team win; Yellow = draw; Red = away team win.

=== Group B-1 ===
Pos	Team	Pld	W	D	L	GF	GA	GD	Pts	Qualification or relegation
1	(Cantabria) Racing de Santander B (substituted on)	6	4	0	2	10	6	+4	12	Promoted to Segunda División B
2	(Navarre) UDC Chantrea	6	4	0	2	8	5	+3	12	
3	(Basque Country (autonomous community)) Real Sociedad B	6	3	1	2	15	8	+7	10	
4	(Aragon) UD Barbastro	6	0	1	5	7	21	−14	1	

Source: Fútbol Regional

Home \ Away	BBS	CHA	RAC	RSO
UD Barbastro	—	1–3	1–3	3–3
UDC Chantrea	3–2	—	1–0	1–0
Racing B	2–0	1–0	—	3–1
Real Sociedad B	7–0	1–0	3–1	—

Updated to match(es) played on completed. Source: FutbolMe
Legend: Blue = home team win; Yellow = draw; Red = away team win.

=== Group B-2 ===
Pos	Team	Pld	W	D	L	GF	GA	GD	Pts	Qualification or relegation
1	(Basque Country (autonomous community)) SD Eibar B (substituted on)	6	4	1	1	7	2	+5	13	Promoted to Segunda División B
2	(Cantabria) SD Noja	6	3	2	1	9	5	+4	11	
3	(Castile and León) CD Mirandés	6	1	2	3	4	8	−4	5	
4	(Aragon) SD Huesca	6	1	1	4	4	9	−5	4	

Source: Fútbol Regional

Home \ Away	EIB	HUE	MIR	NOJ
SD Eibar B	—	1–0	2–0	3–1
SD Huesca	0–1	—	2–1	1–1
CD Mirandés	0–0	2–1	—	0–2
SD Noja	1–0	3–0	1–1	—

Updated to match(es) played on completed. Source: FutbolMe
Legend: Blue = home team win; Yellow = draw; Red = away team win.

=== Group B-3 ===
Pos	Team	Pld	W	D	L	GF	GA	GD	Pts	Qualification or relegation
1	(Cantabria) CD Tropezón (substituted on)	6	3	3	0	7	2	+5	12	Promoted to Segunda División B
2	(La Rioja) CD Logroñés B	6	2	2	2	4	5	−1	8	
3	(Basque Country (autonomous community)) Arenas de Getxo	6	1	3	2	2	5	−3	6	
4	(Aragon) UD Fraga	6	1	2	3	5	6	−1	5	

Source: Fútbol Regional

Home \ Away	ARE	FRA	LOG	TRO
Arenas de Getxo	—	2–1	0–0	0–3
UD Fraga	0–0	—	1–2	0–0
CD Logroñés B	1–0	0–2	—	0–1
CD Tropezón	0–0	2–1	1–1	—

Updated to match(es) played on completed. Source: FutbolMe
Legend: Blue = home team win; Yellow = draw; Red = away team win.

=== Group B-4 ===
Pos	Team	Pld	W	D	L	GF	GA	GD	Pts	Qualification or relegation
1	(Navarre) Peña Sport FC (substituted on)	6	3	3	0	9	1	+8	12	Promoted to Segunda División B
2	(Basque Country (autonomous community)) SD Lemona	6	2	3	1	5	4	+1	9	
3	(Cantabria) CD Miengo	6	1	4	1	6	7	−1	7	
4	(Aragon) CD Endesa Andorra	6	0	2	4	4	12	−8	2	

Source: Fútbol Regional

Home \ Away	EAN	LEM	MIE	PÑS
CD Endesa Andorra	—	1–1	2–2	0–2
SD Lemona	1–0	—	2–0	0–2
CD Miengo	2–1	1–1	—	0–0
Peña Sport FC	4–0	0–0	1–1	—

Updated to match(es) played on completed. Source: FutbolMe
Legend: Blue = home team win; Yellow = draw; Red = away team win.

=== Group C-1 ===
Pos	Team	Pld	W	D	L	GF	GA	GD	Pts	Qualification or relegation
1	(Valencian Community) Benidorm CD (substituted on)	6	4	2	0	11	2	+9	14	Promoted to Segunda División B
2	(Valencian Community) Orihuela CF	6	2	2	2	5	5	0	8	
3	(Catalonia) CF Balaguer	6	2	1	3	5	7	−2	7	
4	(Balearic Islands) CD Constancia	6	1	1	4	4	11	−7	4	

Source: Fútbol Regional

Home \ Away	BAL	BEN	CON	ORI
CF Balaguer	—	0–3	2–0	0–0
Benidorm CD	2–1	—	2–0	3–0
CD Constancia	2–1	1–1	—	1–3
Orihuela CF	0–1	0–0	2–0	—

Updated to match(es) played on completed. Source: FutbolMe
Legend: Blue = home team win; Yellow = draw; Red = away team win.

=== Group C-2 ===
Pos	Team	Pld	W	D	L	GF	GA	GD	Pts	Qualification or relegation
1	(Catalonia) RCD Espanyol B (substituted on)	6	4	1	1	13	6	+7	13	Promoted to Segunda División B
2	(Valencian Community) CD Onda	6	4	1	1	12	6	+6	13	
3	(Region of Murcia) AD Mar Menor	6	1	2	3	6	9	−3	5	
4	(Balearic Islands) SCR Peña Deportiva	6	0	2	4	2	12	−10	2	

Source: Fútbol Regional

Home \ Away	ESP	MMN	OND	PÑD
RCD Espanyol B	—	2–0	4–1	2–1
AD Mar Menor	2–5	—	0–0	3–0
CD Onda	2–0	2–1	—	5–1
SCR Peña Deportiva	0–0	0–0	0–2	—

Updated to match(es) played on completed. Source: FutbolMe
Legend: Blue = home team win; Yellow = draw; Red = away team win.

=== Group C-3 ===
Pos	Team	Pld	W	D	L	GF	GA	GD	Pts	Qualification or relegation
1	(Catalonia) CE Mataró (substituted on)	6	4	2	0	10	5	+5	14	Promoted to Segunda División B
2	(Valencian Community) Alicante CF	6	4	1	1	12	4	+8	13	
3	(Valencian Community) UD Horadada	6	2	1	3	8	13	−5	7	
4	(Balearic Islands) CD Atlético Baleares	6	0	0	6	4	12	−8	0	

Source: Fútbol Regional

Home \ Away	ALI	BAL	HOR	MAT
Alicante CF	—	3–1	4–0	1–1
CD Atlético Baleares	0–1	—	1–2	0–2
UD Horadada	0–2	3–2	—	2–2
CE Mataró	2–1	1–0	2–1	—

Updated to match(es) played on completed. Source: FutbolMe
Legend: Blue = home team win; Yellow = draw; Red = away team win.

=== Group C-4 ===
Pos	Team	Pld	W	D	L	GF	GA	GD	Pts	Qualification or relegation
1	(Valencian Community) CD Burriana (substituted on)	6	3	2	1	8	5	+3	11	Promoted to Segunda División B
2	(Region of Murcia) Club Olímpico de Totana	6	3	1	2	11	7	+4	10	
3	(Catalonia) UE Cornellà	6	2	2	2	9	8	+1	8	
4	(Balearic Islands) CD Manacor	6	1	1	4	8	16	−8	4	

Source: Fútbol Regional

Home \ Away	BUR	COR	MAN	OTO
CD Burriana	—	0–0	1–1	2–0
UE Cornellà	3–1	—	4–0	1–1
CD Manacor	1–3	3–1	—	1–3
Olímpico de Totana	0–1	3–0	4–2	—

Updated to match(es) played on completed. Source: FutbolMe
Legend: Blue = home team win; Yellow = draw; Red = away team win.

=== Group D-1 ===
Pos	Team	Pld	W	D	L	GF	GA	GD	Pts	Qualification or relegation
1	(Andalusia) Polideportivo Ejido (substituted on)	6	4	1	1	8	4	+4	13	Promoted to Segunda División B
2	(Andalusia) Puerto Real CF	6	3	1	2	10	11	−1	10	
3	(Castilla–La Mancha) Albacete Balompié B	6	2	2	2	12	7	+5	8	
4	(Extremadura) CF Villanovense	6	1	0	5	6	14	−8	3	

Source: Fútbol Regional

Home \ Away	ALB	EJI	PUR	VNV
Albacete B	—	1–1	3–0	1–2
Polideportivo Ejido	2–1	—	2–1	2–0
Puerto Real CF	2–2	1–0	—	4–3
CF Villanovense	0–4	0–1	1–2	—

Updated to match(es) played on completed. Source: FutbolMe
Legend: Blue = home team win; Yellow = draw; Red = away team win.

=== Group D-2 ===
Pos	Team	Pld	W	D	L	GF	GA	GD	Pts	Qualification or relegation
1	(Andalusia) CD Linares (substituted on)	6	5	0	1	13	4	+9	15	Promoted to Segunda División B
2	(Castilla–La Mancha) CP Villarrobledo	6	3	1	2	10	12	−2	10	
3	(Extremadura) Mérida Promesas UD	6	2	0	4	5	10	−5	6	
4	(Andalusia) RC Portuense	6	1	1	4	9	11	−2	4	

Source: Fútbol Regional

Home \ Away	LIN	MEP	POR	VRB
CD Linares	—	4–0	2–1	3–0
Mérida Promesas UD	0–1	—	1–0	3–0
RC Portuense	1–2	3–0	—	3–3
CP Villarrobledo	2–1	2–1	3–1	—

Updated to match(es) played on completed. Source: FutbolMe
Legend: Blue = home team win; Yellow = draw; Red = away team win.

=== Group D-3 ===
Pos	Team	Pld	W	D	L	GF	GA	GD	Pts	Qualification or relegation
1	(Andalusia) Algeciras CF (substituted on)	6	4	1	1	12	3	+9	13	Promoted to Segunda División B
2	(Extremadura) CD Don Benito	6	3	2	1	9	7	+2	11	
3	(Andalusia) UD Maracena	6	2	1	3	3	4	−1	7	
4	(Castilla–La Mancha) AD Torpedo 66	6	1	0	5	4	14	−10	3	

Source: Fútbol Regional

Home \ Away	ALG	DBE	MAR	T66
Algeciras CF	—	0–1	1–0	6–0
CD Don Benito	2–2	—	2–1	2–1
UD Maracena	0–1	0–0	—	1–0
AD Torpedo 66	0–2	3–2	0–1	—

Updated to match(es) played on completed. Source: FutbolMe
Legend: Blue = home team win; Yellow = draw; Red = away team win.

=== Group D-4 ===
Pos	Team	Pld	W	D	L	GF	GA	GD	Pts	Qualification or relegation
1	(Andalusia) Almería CF (substituted on)	6	4	0	2	11	7	+4	12	Promoted to Segunda División B
2	(Andalusia) CD San Fernando	6	3	2	1	9	4	+5	11	
3	(Extremadura) UP Plasencia	6	2	2	2	9	9	0	8	
4	(Castilla–La Mancha) UD Puertollano	6	1	0	5	2	11	−9	3	

Source: Fútbol Regional

Home \ Away	ALM	PLA	PUE	SFE
Almería CF	—	5–1	2–0	2–1
UP Plasencia	3–0	—	2–0	2–2
UD Puertollano	0–2	2–1	—	0–2
CD San Fernando	2–0	0–0	2–0	—

Updated to match(es) played on completed. Source: FutbolMe
Legend: Blue = home team win; Yellow = draw; Red = away team win.

=== Group E ===
Pos	Team	Pld	W	D	L	GF	GA	GD	Pts	Qualification or relegation
1	(Canary Islands) UD Vecindario (substituted on)	6	2	4	0	8	6	+2	10	Promoted to Segunda División B
2	(Canary Islands) Castillo CF	6	2	3	1	10	8	+2	9	
3	(Canary Islands) UD Las Palmas B	6	2	2	2	9	6	+3	8	
4	(Canary Islands) UD Orotava	6	1	1	4	5	12	−7	4	

Source: Fútbol Regional

Home \ Away	CAS	LPA	ORO	VEC
Castillo CF	—	0–0	2–0	1–1
UD Las Palmas B	5–1	—	1–0	1–1
UD Orotava	1–5	2–1	—	1–1
UD Vecindario	1–1	2–1	2–1	—

Updated to match(es) played on completed. Source: FutbolMe
Legend: Blue = home team win; Yellow = draw; Red = away team win.

== Teams Promoted ==
Group I – Galicia (Galicia (Spain))

- RC Deportivo La Coruña B

Group II – Asturias

- Club Siero
- AD Universidad de Oviedo

Group III – Cantabria

- CD Tropezón
- Racing de Santander B

Group IV – Basque Country (Basque Country (autonomous community))

- SD Eibar B

Group V – Catalonia

- RCD Espanyol B
- CE Mataró

Group VI – Valencian Community

- CD Burriana
- Benidorm CD

Group VII – Community of Madrid

- AD Alcorcón

Group VIII – Castile and León

- None

Group IX – E. Andalusia and Melilla

- Polideportivo Ejido
- CD Linares
- Almería CF

Group X – W. Andalusia and Ceuta

- Algeciras CF

Group XI – Balearic Islands

- None

Group XII – Canary Islands

- UD Vecindario

Group XIII – Region of Murcia

- None

Group XIV – Extremadura

- None

Group XV – Navarre and La Rioja

- Peña Sport FC

Group XVI – Aragon

- None

Group XVII – Castilla–La Mancha

- None
