= Joyce Moreno =

Joyce Moreno may refer to:

- Joyce Moreno (musician) (born 1948), Brazilian singer/songwriter, guitarist and arranger
- Joyce Moreno (footballer) (born 1974), Panamian-Spanish footballer
