= Gondomar CF =

Spanish football club

Gondomar
- Full name: Gondomar Club de Fútbol
- Founded: 1914
- Ground: As Gaiandas, Gondomar, Pontevedra, Galicia, Spain
- Capacity: 2,000
- President: David Pazos
- Manager: Iago González
- League: Primera Futgal – Group 6
- 2024–25: Primera Futgal – Group 6, 3rd of 18
Home colours	Away colours

Gondomar Club de Fútbol is a football team based in Gondomar, Pontevedra, in the autonomous community of Galicia. Founded in 1914, they play in Primera Futgal – Group 6, holding home matches at the Campo de Futbol Municipal das Gaiandas.

== Season to season ==
Season	Tier	Division	Place	Copa del Rey
1929–1946	—	Regional	—	
1946–47	4	Serie A	(R)	
1947–48	5	1ª Reg.		
1948–49	5	1ª Reg.		
1949–50	5	1ª Reg.		
1950–51	5	1ª Reg.		
1951–52	5	1ª Reg.		
1952–53	5	1ª Reg.		
1953–54	5	1ª Reg.	4th	
1954–55	5	1ª Reg.	1st	
1955–56	5	1ª Reg.	6th	
1956–57	5	1ª Reg.	4th	
1957–58	5	1ª Reg.	10th	
1958–59	5	1ª Reg.	4th	
1959–60	5	1ª Reg.	5th	
1960–61	4	Serie A	8th	
1961–62	4	Serie A	6th	
1962–63	4	Serie A	8th	
1963–64	4	Serie A	7th	
1964–65	5	1ª Reg.	9th	

Season	Tier	Division	Place	Copa del Rey
1965–66	4	Serie A	12th	
1966–67	4	Serie A	6th	
1967–68	5	1ª Reg.	8th	
1968–69	6	2ª Reg.	6th	
1969–70	6	2ª Reg.	6th	
1970–71	6	2ª Reg.	7th	
1971–72	6	2ª Reg.	6th	
1972–73	6	2ª Reg.	8th	
1973–74	6	2ª Reg.	6th	
1974–75	6	2ª Reg.	12th	
1975–76	6	2ª Reg.	7th	
1976–77	6	2ª Reg.	3rd	
1977–78	7	2ª Reg.	2nd	
1978–79	7	2ª Reg.	4th	
1979–80	7	2ª Reg.	3rd	
1980–81	6	1ª Reg.	4th	
1981–82	5	Reg. Pref.	2nd	
1982–83	4	3ª	19th	
1983–84	5	Reg. Pref.	7th	
1984–85	5	Reg. Pref.	18th	

Season	Tier	Division	Place	Copa del Rey
1985–86	5	Reg. Pref.	1st	
1986–87	4	3ª	10th	
1987–88	4	3ª	7th	
1988–89	4	3ª	15th	
1989–90	4	3ª	13th	
1990–91	4	3ª	18th	
1991–92	4	3ª	11th	
1992–93	4	3ª	18th	
1993–94	5	Reg. Pref.	9th	
1994–95	5	Reg. Pref.	6th	
1995–96	5	Reg. Pref.	2nd	
1996–97	4	3ª	13th	
1997–98	4	3ª	15th	
1998–99	4	3ª	8th	
1999–2000	4	3ª	11th	
2000–01	4	3ª	16th	
2001–02	4	3ª	20th	
2002–03	5	Reg. Pref.	15th	
2003–04	5	Reg. Pref.	9th	
2004–05	5	Reg. Pref.	4th	

Season	Tier	Division	Place	Copa del Rey
2005–06	5	Reg. Pref.	17th	
2006–07	5	Pref. Aut.	15th	
2007–08	5	Pref. Aut.	20th	
2008–09	6	1ª Aut.	10th	
2009–10	6	1ª Aut.	9th	
2010–11	6	1ª Aut.	5th	
2011–12	6	1ª Aut.	3rd	
2012–13	5	Pref. Aut.	6th	
2013–14	5	Pref. Aut.	7th	
2014–15	5	Pref. Aut.	8th	
2015–16	5	Pref.	4th	
2016–17	5	Pref.	10th	
2017–18	5	Pref.	17th	
2018–19	6	1ª Gal.	17th	
2019–20	7	2ª Gal.	6th	
2020–21	DNP			
2021–22	8	2ª Gal.	5th	
2022–23	8	2ª Gal.	3rd	
2023–24	8	2ª Gal.	3rd	
2024–25	7	1ª Futgal	3rd	

Season	Tier	Division	Place	Copa del Rey
2025–26	7	1ª Futgal		

- 14 seasons in Tercera División
