= UD Xove Lago =

Xove Lago
- Full name: Unión Deportiva Xove Lago
- Founded: 1974
- Ground: Campo Municipal de Xove, Xove; Galicia, Spain
- Capacity: 1,000
- President: Antonio Meitín
- Manager: Santi Silvar
- League: Primera Futgal – Group 3
- 2024–25: Primera Futgal – Group 3, 8th of 18
Home colours	Away colours

Unión Deportiva Xove Lago is a Spanish football club based in Xove, Lugo, in the autonomous community of Galicia. Founded in 1974, they currently play in Primera Futgal – Group 3, holding home matches at the Campo Municipal de Xove.

== History ==
Founded in 1974 as Unión Deportiva Jove Lago in the place of Unión Club Lago Deportivo, the club was renamed to Unión Deportiva Xove Lago in 1983, and achieved their first-ever promotion to Tercera División in 1992.

== Season to season ==
Season	Tier	Division	Place	Copa del Rey
1974–75	5	1ª Reg.	5th	
1975–76	5	1ª Reg.	1st	
1976–77	5	1ª Reg.	3rd	
1977–78	6	1ª Reg.	2nd	
1978–79	6	1ª Reg.	10th	
1979–80	6	1ª Reg.	7th	
1980–81	5	Reg. Pref.	7th	
1981–82	5	Reg. Pref.	20th	
1982–83	6	1ª Reg.	3rd	
1983–84	6	1ª Reg.	3rd	
1984–85	6	1ª Reg.	1st	
1985–86	5	Reg. Pref.	8th	
1986–87	5	Reg. Pref.	15th	
1987–88	5	Reg. Pref.	7th	
1988–89	5	Reg. Pref.	3rd	
1989–90	5	Reg. Pref.	12th	
1990–91	5	Reg. Pref.	3rd	
1991–92	5	Reg. Pref.	2nd	
1992–93	4	3ª	8th	
1993–94	4	3ª	6th	

Season	Tier	Division	Place	Copa del Rey
1994–95	4	3ª	14th	
1995–96	4	3ª	13th	
1996–97	4	3ª	15th	
1997–98	4	3ª	9th	
1998–99	4	3ª	5th	
1999–2000	4	3ª	3rd	
2000–01	4	3ª	4th	First round
2001–02	4	3ª	14th	
2002–03	4	3ª	7th	
2003–04	4	3ª	20th	
2004–05	5	Reg. Pref.	8th	
2005–06	5	Reg. Pref.	4th	
2006–07	5	Pref. Aut.	19th	
2007–08	6	1ª Aut.	14th	
2008–09	6	1ª Aut.	1st	
2009–10	5	Pref. Aut.	16th	
2010–11	5	Pref. Aut.	5th	
2011–12	5	Pref. Aut.	18th	
2012–13	6	1ª Aut.	4th	
2013–14	6	1ª Aut.	6th	

Season	Tier	Division	Place	Copa del Rey
2014–15	6	1ª Aut.	6th	
2015–16	6	1ª Aut.	6th	
2016–17	6	1ª Gal.	13th	
2017–18	6	1ª Gal.	6th	
2018–19	6	1ª Gal.	12th	
2019–20	6	1ª Gal.	11th	
2020–21	DNP			
2021–22	7	1ª Gal.	5th	
2022–23	7	1ª Gal.	11th	
2023–24	7	1ª Gal.	11th	
2024–25	7	1ª Futgal	8th	
2025–26	7	1ª Futgal		

- 12 seasons in Tercera División
