= 1999–2000 Tercera División =

Tercera División
- Season: 1999–2000
- Dates: August 1999–June 2000
- Matches: 12,920

The Spanish Tercera División 1999–00 started in August 1999 and ended in June 2000 with the promotion play-off finals. Is the 23nd season since establishment the tier four.

== Grupo I ==
Pos	Team	Pld	W	D	L	GF	GA	GD	Pts
1	RC Celta de Vigo B	38	21	8	9	60	28	+32	71
2	Deportivo de La Coruña B	38	17	16	5	58	31	+27	67
3	UD Xove Lago	38	17	12	9	39	33	+6	63
4	CD Lalín	38	17	9	12	46	43	+3	60
5	Betanzos CF	38	15	10	13	59	52	+7	55
6	SD Compostela B	38	15	10	13	55	46	+9	55
7	CD Endesa As Pontes	38	14	11	13	40	42	−2	53
8	CCD Cerceda	38	13	13	12	49	45	+4	52
9	Racing Club Villalbés	38	13	12	13	54	55	−1	51
10	Alondras CF	38	13	12	13	56	48	+8	51
11	Gondomar CF	38	13	12	13	47	42	+5	51
12	Rápido de Bouzas	38	14	8	16	46	49	−3	50
13	Viveiro CF	38	12	14	12	42	43	−1	50
14	Club Lemos	38	11	15	12	39	46	−7	48
15	Ponte Ourense CF	38	11	13	14	50	60	−10	46
16	Porriño Industrial FC	38	9	17	12	36	41	−5	44
17	CD Grove	38	10	12	16	30	48	−18	42
18	Arosa SC (R)	38	10	10	18	45	66	−21	40
19	Villalonga FC (R)	38	8	13	17	33	49	−16	37
20	CD Ourense B (R)	38	8	11	19	38	55	−17	35

(R) Relegated

== Grupo II ==
Pos	Team	Pld	W	D	L	GF	GA	GD	Pts
1	CD Lealtad	38	23	10	5	66	36	+30	79
2	Club Siero	38	23	6	9	64	32	+32	75
3	Marino de Luanco	38	20	12	6	74	30	+44	72
4	Universidad de Oviedo	38	21	8	9	60	34	+26	71
5	UP Langreo	38	18	12	8	63	35	+28	66
6	Club Astur	38	18	10	10	58	35	+23	64
7	Navia CF	38	14	9	15	51	53	−2	51
8	CD San Martín	38	13	11	14	44	43	+1	50
9	CD Llanes	38	13	11	14	54	57	−3	50
10	Deportiva Piloñesa	38	13	8	17	52	57	−5	47
11	Real Titánico	38	12	10	16	43	55	−12	46
12	Navarro CF	38	13	7	18	51	56	−5	46
13	CD Tuilla	38	11	11	16	40	61	−21	44
14	Ribadesella CF	38	12	8	18	35	55	−20	44
15	CD Turón	38	12	8	18	43	61	−18	44
16	SD Colloto	38	11	10	17	35	50	−15	43
17	CD Mosconia	38	11	10	17	47	64	−17	43
18	UD Gijón Industrial (R)	38	10	12	16	35	52	−17	42
19	SD Narcea (R)	38	9	10	19	34	51	−17	37
20	Andés CF (R)	38	5	13	20	24	56	−32	28

(R) Relegated

== Grupo III ==
Pos	Team	Pld	W	D	L	GF	GA	GD	Pts
1	SD Noja	38	26	9	3	82	19	+63	87
2	CD Tropezón	38	21	12	5	66	20	+46	75
3	Racing de Santander B	38	20	11	7	59	24	+35	71
4	CD Miengo	38	19	12	7	57	30	+27	69
5	Atlético Deva	38	16	13	9	51	36	+15	61
6	Santoña CF	38	17	6	15	49	49	0	57
7	SD Barreda Balompié	38	16	7	15	46	53	−7	55
8	UM Escobedo	38	15	9	14	53	51	+2	54
9	CD Bezana	38	13	14	11	53	47	+6	53
10	CD Guarnizo	38	14	8	16	54	59	−5	50
11	CD Laredo	38	13	7	18	35	56	−21	46
12	SD Revilla	38	10	15	13	36	41	−5	45
13	CD Naval	38	11	12	15	32	56	−24	45
14	Velarde CF	38	11	12	15	49	48	+1	45
15	SD Textil Escudo	38	12	8	18	39	47	−8	44
16	CF Ribamontán	38	11	10	17	42	47	−5	43
17	CD Cayón	38	9	16	13	50	48	+2	43
18	CD Comillas (R)	38	8	15	15	37	66	−29	39
19	Marina Cudeyo CF (R)	38	8	6	24	34	82	−48	30
20	Ampuero FC (R)	38	7	4	27	34	79	−45	25

(R) Relegated

== Grupo IV ==
Pos	Team	Pld	W	D	L	GF	GA	GD	Pts
1	Real Sociedad B	38	24	10	4	68	22	+46	82
2	SD Lemona	38	19	11	8	53	31	+22	68
3	Arenas Club de Getxo	38	18	13	7	46	33	+13	67
4	SD Eibar B	38	18	10	10	58	33	+25	64
5	CD Baskonia	38	18	9	11	60	41	+19	63
6	Sestao River	38	18	6	14	43	32	+11	60
7	Zalla UC	38	14	11	13	32	33	−1	53
8	CD Hernani	38	14	11	13	35	41	−6	53
9	Aurrerá de Vitoria B	38	13	11	14	40	43	−3	50
10	SCD Durango	38	12	12	14	46	50	−4	48
11	CD Aurrerá de Ondarroa	38	11	15	12	45	37	+8	48
12	SD Amorebieta	38	12	12	14	39	47	−8	48
13	CD Lagún Onak	38	13	8	17	42	45	−3	47
14	Universidad PV	38	11	13	14	33	43	−10	46
15	Sodupe UC	38	12	8	18	43	52	−9	44
16	Bergara KE	38	10	13	15	43	47	−4	43
17	SD San Pedro	38	8	19	11	31	38	−7	43
18	CD Elgóibar (R)	38	9	10	19	32	46	−14	37
19	CD Santurtzi (R)	38	10	7	21	28	78	−50	37
20	Tolosa CF (R)	38	7	9	22	33	58	−25	30

(R) Relegated

== Grupo V ==
Pos	Team	Pld	W	D	L	GF	GA	GD	Pts
1	CF Balaguer	38	24	10	4	58	23	+35	82
2	RCD Espanyol B	38	24	4	10	76	42	+34	76
3	CE Mataró	38	23	7	8	84	40	+44	76
4	UE Cornellà	38	19	11	8	54	31	+23	68
5	Palamós CF	38	20	7	11	57	36	+21	67
6	CE Europa	38	18	8	12	68	50	+18	62
7	Girona FC	38	15	13	10	49	47	+2	58
8	UE Badaloní	38	17	5	16	45	56	−11	56
9	FC Barcelona C	38	16	7	15	70	53	+17	55
10	CF Gavà	38	15	7	16	48	50	−2	52
11	Vilobí CF	38	12	11	15	55	53	+2	47
12	CD Tortosa	38	13	7	18	49	63	−14	46
13	UE Tàrrega	38	13	7	18	46	52	−6	46
14	CF Reus Deportiu	38	12	9	17	44	54	−10	45
15	AD Guíxols	38	12	8	18	44	62	−18	44
16	CD Banyoles	38	10	11	17	42	60	−18	41
17	AEC Manlleu	38	11	7	20	35	54	−19	40
18	CF Badalona (R)	38	11	7	20	47	74	−27	40
19	UA Horta (R)	38	10	8	20	55	68	−13	38
20	UE Vic (R)	38	5	6	27	27	85	−58	21

(R) Relegated

== Grupo VI ==
Pos	Team	Pld	W	D	L	GF	GA	GD	Pts
1	CD Onda	38	22	10	6	83	42	+41	76
2	CD Burriana	38	21	11	6	57	34	+23	74
3	Benidorm CD	38	21	8	9	55	31	+24	71
4	Alicante CF	38	20	10	8	61	32	+29	70
5	CD Eldense	38	16	11	11	43	43	0	59
6	Levante UD B	38	15	12	11	47	34	+13	57
7	Elche CF B	38	14	12	12	45	44	+1	54
8	Burjassot CF	38	15	8	15	55	44	+11	53
9	CD Denia	38	12	15	11	38	30	+8	51
10	Santa Pola CF	38	13	12	13	37	45	−8	51
11	Pinoso CF	38	13	10	15	26	42	−16	49
12	CD Alcoyano	38	13	10	15	43	38	+5	49
13	Pego CF	38	12	13	13	44	43	+1	49
14	Foyos CD	38	13	8	17	39	52	−13	47
15	CD Buñol	38	12	11	15	36	46	−10	47
16	Gimnástico CF	38	10	16	12	32	39	−7	46
17	UD Vall d'Uixó	38	11	10	17	42	52	−10	43
18	CD San Marcelino (R)	38	11	8	19	42	48	−6	41
19	CD Olímpic de Xàtiva (R)	38	6	8	24	31	66	−35	26
20	CD Pobla Llarga (R)	38	4	9	25	29	80	−51	21

(R) Relegated

== Grupo VII ==
Pos	Team	Pld	W	D	L	GF	GA	GD	Pts
1	CD Coslada	38	24	8	6	63	31	+32	80
2	Real Madrid C	38	23	9	6	81	31	+50	78
3	DAV Santa Ana	38	20	11	7	76	42	+34	71
4	RSD Alcalá	38	21	5	12	65	48	+17	68
5	AD Alcorcón	38	18	11	9	59	38	+21	65
6	CD Las Rozas	38	18	7	13	49	37	+12	61
7	Atlético Pinto	38	18	5	15	40	41	−1	59
8	Rayo Vallecano B	38	17	7	14	52	48	+4	58
9	CP Amorós	38	15	11	12	53	39	+14	56
10	CD Leganés B	38	16	6	16	51	49	+2	54
11	Real Aranjuez CF	38	13	11	14	38	50	−12	50
12	CDA Navalcarnero	38	11	12	15	37	52	−15	45
13	CD Pegaso	38	10	13	15	46	58	−12	43
14	Getafe CF B	38	9	15	14	37	46	−9	42
15	CD Colonia Moscardó	38	8	16	14	45	49	−4	40
16	Atlético Cercedilla	38	9	13	16	41	69	−28	40
17	CD Puerta Bonita	38	7	15	16	36	42	−6	36
18	AD Colmenar Viejo (R)	38	9	7	22	46	74	−28	34
19	RCD Carabanchel (R)	38	8	8	22	32	69	−37	32
20	AD Villaviciosa (R)	38	7	8	23	38	72	−34	29

(R) Relegated

== Grupo VIII ==
Pos	Team	Pld	W	D	L	GF	GA	GD	Pts
1	UD Salamanca B	38	21	11	6	74	36	+38	74
2	La Bañeza FC	38	22	7	9	60	30	+30	73
3	CA Bembibre	38	20	12	6	61	36	+25	72
4	CD Béjar Industrial	38	22	5	11	79	49	+30	71
5	Norma San Leonardo	38	19	11	8	70	37	+33	68
6	Cultural Leonesa B	38	19	11	8	65	33	+32	68
7	CF Palencia	38	18	9	11	62	33	+29	63
8	Racing Lermeño FC	38	17	11	10	53	41	+12	62
9	CD Becerril	38	17	7	14	55	52	+3	58
10	CD Laguna	38	14	12	12	55	44	+11	54
11	CD Benavente	38	15	7	16	48	61	−13	52
12	Arandina CF	38	13	12	13	58	52	+6	51
13	Gimnástica Medinense	38	14	8	16	45	41	+4	50
14	CD Venta de Baños	38	11	9	18	27	41	−14	42
15	Atlético Astorga FC	38	12	6	20	48	65	−17	42
16	CD Boecillo (R)	38	10	9	19	43	69	−26	39
17	SD Almazán (R)	38	7	15	16	41	64	−23	36
18	Betis CF (R)	38	9	8	21	42	69	−27	35
19	Cuéllar CF (R)	38	5	9	24	42	99	−57	24
20	Garray CF (R)	38	5	1	32	29	105	−76	16

(R) Relegated

== Grupo IX ==
Pos	Team	Pld	W	D	L	GF	GA	GD	Pts
1	Polideportivo Ejido	38	24	8	6	66	34	+32	80
2	CD Linares	38	23	8	7	71	38	+33	77
3	UD Maracena	38	22	9	7	47	20	+27	75
4	Almería CF	38	21	12	5	61	23	+38	75
5	Torredonjimeno CF	38	22	9	7	53	30	+23	75
6	CP Granada 74	38	21	11	6	71	36	+35	74
7	Málaga CF B	38	18	12	8	61	35	+26	66
8	UD Marbella	38	16	8	14	51	41	+10	56
9	CD Roquetas	38	14	11	13	61	52	+9	53
10	Vandalia Industrial	38	13	11	14	51	48	+3	50
11	UD San Pedro	38	10	11	17	42	48	−6	41
12	Loja CD	38	10	10	18	34	49	−15	40
13	Juventud Torremolinos CF	38	11	7	20	42	56	−14	40
14	Antequera CF	38	10	10	18	33	50	−17	40
15	Úbeda CF	38	9	12	17	25	43	−18	39
16	CD Alhaurino	38	10	8	20	41	61	−20	38
17	Vélez CF	38	9	11	18	33	53	−20	38
18	Martos CD (R)	38	9	9	20	33	62	−29	36
19	Atlético Mancha Real (R)	38	8	8	22	29	61	−32	32
20	UD San Isidro (R)	38	5	5	28	31	96	−65	20

(R) Relegated

== Grupo X ==
Pos	Team	Pld	W	D	L	GF	GA	GD	Pts
1	Algeciras CF	38	22	9	7	64	32	+32	75
2	CD San Fernando	38	18	14	6	58	31	+27	68
3	Puerto Real CF	38	20	5	13	62	41	+21	65
4	Racing Club Portuense	38	18	11	9	44	41	+3	65
5	UD Los Palacios	38	18	10	10	54	43	+11	64
6	Atlético Sanluqueño CF	38	17	12	9	61	47	+14	63
7	CD Pozoblanco	38	17	9	12	62	47	+15	60
8	Recreativo de Huelva B	38	15	12	11	49	38	+11	57
9	CA Lucentino Industrial	38	13	16	9	45	36	+9	55
10	UD Tomares	38	15	10	13	55	51	+4	55
11	CD Villanueva	38	13	12	13	43	49	−6	51
12	Córdoba CF B	38	12	12	14	53	54	−1	48
13	La Palma CF	38	12	12	14	41	45	−4	48
14	AD Cartaya	38	12	11	15	49	54	−5	47
15	Ayamonte CF	38	10	11	17	35	53	−18	41
16	UD Los Barrios	38	10	10	18	35	49	−14	40
17	Chiclana CF	38	10	9	19	42	58	−16	39
18	CD Viña Verde Montilla (R)	38	8	14	16	39	59	−20	38
19	CD Rota (R)	38	7	6	25	34	69	−35	27
20	AD Ceuta B (R)	38	6	9	23	42	70	−28	27

(R) Relegated

== Grupo XI ==
Pos	Team	Pld	W	D	L	GF	GA	GD	Pts
1	CD Atlético Baleares	38	29	4	5	97	40	+57	91
2	CD Constancia	38	27	7	4	89	32	+57	88
3	CD Manacor	38	21	8	9	76	43	+33	71
4	Santa Eulàlia	38	19	10	9	58	33	+25	67
5	CF Sporting Mahonés	38	20	4	14	77	48	+29	64
6	CD Cardessar	38	15	11	12	45	39	+6	56
7	RCD Santa Ponsa	38	15	11	12	50	40	+10	56
8	CF Villafranca	38	16	7	15	55	54	+1	55
9	UD Poblense	38	15	9	14	62	51	+11	54
10	CD Playas de Calvià	38	14	12	12	58	53	+5	54
11	CD Ferriolense	38	14	9	15	63	70	−7	51
12	CD Campos	38	13	10	15	57	61	−4	49
13	CD Binissalem	38	14	7	17	46	50	−4	49
14	CD Alayor	38	14	5	19	38	59	−21	47
15	CE Eivissa	38	13	3	22	44	74	−30	42
16	CF Pollença	38	10	8	20	49	73	−24	38
17	Atlètic de Ciutadella	38	9	11	18	36	62	−26	38
18	CD Felanitx (R)	38	10	8	20	36	69	−33	38
19	CD Génova (R)	38	8	4	26	48	102	−54	28
20	UD Arenal (R)	38	7	6	25	36	67	−31	27

(R) Relegated

== Grupo XII ==
Pos	Team	Pld	W	D	L	GF	GA	GD	Pts
1	UD Las Palmas B	38	24	4	10	85	39	+46	76
2	UD Orotava	38	21	11	6	67	36	+31	74
3	UD Vecindario	38	20	10	8	49	26	+23	70
4	Castillo CF	38	20	10	8	47	29	+18	70
5	CD San Isidro	38	19	12	7	57	34	+23	69
6	CD Corralejo	38	16	14	8	50	32	+18	62
7	UD Telde	38	15	10	13	53	38	+15	55
8	Victoria	38	15	10	13	41	45	−4	55
9	CD Tenerife B	38	13	13	12	55	47	+8	52
10	Orientación Marítima	38	14	9	15	51	51	0	51
11	CD La Angostura	38	14	8	16	38	47	−9	50
12	UD Gáldar	38	13	9	16	46	51	−5	48
13	SD Tenisca	38	14	6	18	57	56	+1	48
14	CD Doramas	38	12	11	15	41	47	−6	47
15	UD Realejos	38	12	7	19	55	67	−12	43
16	CD La Oliva	38	11	9	18	41	66	−25	42
17	UD Ibarra	38	11	7	20	41	70	−29	40
18	CD Puerto Cruz (R)	38	9	11	18	40	59	−19	38
19	UD Icodense (R)	38	9	5	24	33	70	−37	32
20	CD Maspalomas (R)	38	5	10	23	29	66	−37	25

(R) Relegated

== Grupo XIII ==
Pos	Team	Pld	W	D	L	GF	GA	GD	Pts
1	Olímpico de Totana	38	21	13	4	80	35	+45	76
2	UD Horadada	38	21	13	4	66	29	+37	76
3	AD Mar Menor-San Javier	38	21	12	5	70	39	+31	75
4	Orihuela CF	38	20	11	7	68	34	+34	71
5	Jumilla CF	38	19	11	8	56	41	+15	68
6	Relesa Las Palas	38	18	7	13	60	44	+16	61
7	CD Alhameño	38	16	11	11	68	46	+22	59
8	CD Molinense	38	16	11	11	54	43	+11	59
9	Real Murcia B	38	15	12	11	64	47	+17	57
10	CD Cieza	38	15	9	14	46	45	+1	54
11	CD Bala Azul	38	13	12	13	57	51	+6	51
12	CD Bullense	38	13	10	15	43	46	−3	49
13	CD Alquerías	38	10	12	16	37	58	−21	42
14	Sangonera Atlético CF	38	10	11	17	40	51	−11	41
15	CD Lumbreras	38	10	9	19	36	58	−22	39
16	Caravaca CF	38	10	8	20	51	79	−28	38
17	Atlético Abarán (R)	38	9	10	19	48	73	−25	37
18	Muleño CF (R)	38	10	5	23	45	80	−35	35
19	AD Ceutí Atlético (R)	38	8	5	25	41	84	−43	29
20	CD Beniel (R)	38	4	10	24	28	75	−47	22

(R) Relegated

== Grupo XIV ==
Pos	Team	Pld	W	D	L	GF	GA	GD	Pts
1	CP Mérida B	38	26	6	6	77	28	+49	84
2	CD Don Benito	38	25	8	5	76	27	+49	83
3	UP Plasencia	38	23	10	5	78	38	+40	79
4	CF Villanovense	38	22	12	4	75	21	+54	78
5	CD Grabasa Burguillos	38	23	8	7	54	22	+32	77
6	CD Díter Zafra	38	20	8	10	68	30	+38	68
7	CD Coria	38	21	5	12	64	44	+20	68
8	CF Extremadura B	38	17	8	13	64	39	+25	59
9	CD Valdelacalzada	38	15	7	16	48	41	+7	52
10	SP Villafranca	38	13	11	14	49	45	+4	50
11	Moralo CP	38	13	9	16	48	52	−4	48
12	CP Monesterio	38	13	9	16	40	52	−12	48
13	CD Badajoz B	38	11	11	16	49	63	−14	44
14	AD Cerro de Reyes	38	9	12	17	43	65	−22	39
15	Sanvicenteño FC	38	10	8	20	40	57	−17	38
16	CP Cacereño B	38	11	4	23	33	76	−43	37
17	UC La Estrella	38	9	10	19	45	64	−19	37
18	CP Olivenza (R)	38	9	8	21	38	69	−31	35
19	CP Guareña (R)	38	4	7	27	23	95	−72	19
20	CP Gran Maestre (R)	38	2	7	29	30	114	−84	13

(R) Relegated

== Grupo XV ==
Pos	Team	Pld	W	D	L	GF	GA	GD	Pts
1	Peña Sport	38	21	11	6	65	27	+38	74
2	UDC Chantrea	38	20	10	8	59	31	+28	70
3	CD Mirandés	38	19	7	12	52	43	+9	64
4	CD Logroñés B	38	17	10	11	61	44	+17	61
5	UCD Burladés	38	16	11	11	53	40	+13	59
6	CD Aoiz	38	17	8	13	51	45	+6	59
7	CD Egüés	38	17	7	14	59	50	+9	58
8	CD Tudelano	38	13	17	8	56	41	+15	56
9	CD Azkoyen	38	14	10	14	45	40	+5	52
10	Haro Deportivo	38	15	7	16	47	55	−8	52
11	CD Alfaro	38	14	8	16	53	56	−3	50
12	CA River Ebro	38	13	10	15	50	61	−11	49
13	CD Oberena	38	11	15	12	40	37	+3	48
14	CD Beti Onak	38	12	11	15	42	60	−18	47
15	CD Idoya	38	13	8	17	65	87	−22	47
16	CD Agoncillo	38	11	13	14	40	49	−9	46
17	CA Artajonés	38	10	14	14	37	49	−12	44
18	AD San Juan (R)	38	12	7	19	49	53	−4	43
19	CD Huarte (R)	38	11	7	20	40	61	−21	40
20	CD Baztán (R)	38	4	9	25	32	67	−35	21

(R) Relegated

== Grupo XVI ==
Pos	Team	Pld	W	D	L	GF	GA	GD	Pts
1	UD Fraga	38	24	7	7	85	46	+39	79
2	SD Huesca	38	22	6	10	86	50	+36	72
3	CD Endesa Andorra	38	21	8	9	75	36	+39	71
4	UD Barbastro	38	19	8	11	70	45	+25	65
5	CD Teruel	38	20	5	13	65	45	+20	65
6	UD Casetas	38	18	10	10	59	43	+16	64
7	UD Alcampel	38	15	15	8	57	44	+13	60
8	Utebo FC	38	15	11	12	64	56	+8	56
9	CD Fuentes	38	14	8	16	59	63	−4	50
10	Villanueva CF	38	11	15	12	49	47	+2	48
11	FC Lalueza	38	12	11	15	43	50	−7	47
12	CDJ Peralta	38	13	7	18	42	56	−14	46
13	CD San Gregorio	38	12	10	16	41	62	−21	46
14	CD La Almunia	38	12	8	18	46	61	−15	44
15	CD Ebro	38	10	13	15	39	45	−6	43
16	CD Sariñena	38	11	9	18	35	55	−20	42
17	CA Monzalbarba (R)	38	11	8	19	45	65	−20	41
18	CF Illueca (R)	38	9	11	18	47	64	−17	38
19	Alcañiz CF (R)	38	11	4	23	36	74	−38	37
20	CD Maella (R)	38	7	12	19	31	67	−36	33

(R) Relegated

== Grupo XVII ==
Pos	Team	Pld	W	D	L	GF	GA	GD	Pts
1	UD Puertollano	38	22	8	8	63	38	+25	74
2	Albacete Balompié B	38	21	10	7	62	26	+36	73
3	CP Villarrobledo	38	19	13	6	69	41	+28	70
4	AD Torpedo 66	38	18	8	12	60	52	+8	62
5	CD Quintanar del Rey	38	15	15	8	48	43	+5	60
6	UD Socuéllamos	38	17	9	12	50	42	+8	60
7	UD Almansa	38	15	13	10	56	47	+9	58
8	CD Cuenca	38	13	14	11	42	36	+6	53
9	CD Guadalajara	38	14	11	13	53	50	+3	53
10	CF Valdepeñas	38	13	10	15	36	34	+2	49
11	Gimnástico Alcázar	38	13	10	15	51	51	0	49
12	Hellín Deportivo	38	11	13	14	43	44	−1	46
13	AD Campillo	38	11	12	15	40	49	−9	45
14	CD Torrijos	38	10	15	13	39	50	−11	45
15	CD Piedrabuena	38	11	11	16	46	58	−12	44
16	CD Bolañego	38	10	14	14	42	50	−8	44
17	Tomelloso CF	38	11	10	17	42	51	−9	43
18	CD Sigüenza (R)	38	10	9	19	40	73	−33	39
19	CD Toledo B (R)	38	10	8	20	40	54	−14	38
20	CF La Solana (R)	38	5	9	24	28	61	−33	24

(R) Relegated

== Promotion play-offs ==
Source:
