= Sodupe UC =

Association football club in Spain

Coordinates: 43.19567°N 3.04681°W

- Full name: Sodupe Unión Club
- Founded: 1947; 79 years ago
- Ground: Campo Lorenzo Hurtado de Saratxo, Sodupe, Basque Country, Spain
- Capacity: 1,500
- Head coach: Javier Pareda Rodriguez
- League: Tercera Federación – Group 4
- 2025–26: División de Honor, 2nd of 18 (promoted via play-offs)
- Website: https://sodupeuc.com
Home colours	Away colours

Sodupe Unión Club is a Spanish football team located in Sodupe in the Basque Autonomous Community. Founded in 1947, it currently plays in Tercera Federación – Group 4, holding home matches at Campo Lorenzo Hurtado de Saratxo with a capacity of 1,500 spectators.

== History ==
Sodupe UC was founded in 1947.

== Season to season ==
Season	Tier	Division	Place	Copa del Rey
1947–48	5	2ª Reg.	7th	
1948–49	5	2ª Reg.	7th	
1949–50	6	3ª Reg.	3rd	
1950–51	6	3ª Reg.	6th	
1951–52	6	3ª Reg.	1st	
1952–53	6	3ª Reg.	3rd	
1953–54	5	2ª Reg.	11th	
1954–55	6	3ª Reg.	2nd	
1955–56	5	2ª Reg.	12th	
1956–57	5	2ª Reg.	5th	
1957–58	5	2ª Reg.	2nd	
1958–59	4	1ª Reg.	11th	
1959–60	4	1ª Reg.	13th	
1960–61	5	2ª Reg.	8th	
1961–62	5	2ª Reg.	6th	
1962–63	5	2ª Reg.	4th	
1963–64	5	2ª Reg.	2nd	
1964–65	4	1ª Reg.	2nd	
1965–66	4	1ª Reg.	5th	
1966–67	4	1ª Reg.	8th	

Season	Tier	Division	Place	Copa del Rey
1967–68	4	1ª Reg.	8th	
1968–69	4	Reg. Pref.	9th	
1969–70	4	Reg. Pref.	8th	
1970–71	4	Reg. Pref.	8th	
1971–72	4	Reg. Pref.	7th	
1972–73	4	Reg. Pref.	12th	
1973–74	4	Reg. Pref.	19th	
1974–75	5	1ª Reg.	12th	
1975–76	5	1ª Reg.	10th	
1976–77	5	1ª Reg.	18th	
1977–78	6	1ª Reg.	11th	
1978–79	6	1ª Reg.	1st	
1979–80	5	Reg. Pref.	14th	
1980–81	5	Reg. Pref.	15th	
1981–82	5	Reg. Pref.	8th	
1982–83	5	Reg. Pref.	6th	
1983–84	5	Reg. Pref.	4th	
1984–85	5	Reg. Pref.	5th	
1985–86	5	Reg. Pref.	5th	
1986–87	5	Reg. Pref.	4th	

Season	Tier	Division	Place	Copa del Rey
1987–88	5	Reg. Pref.	2nd	
1988–89	5	Reg. Pref.	1st	
1989–90	4	3ª	15th	
1990–91	4	3ª	14th	
1991–92	4	3ª	16th	
1992–93	4	3ª	11th	
1993–94	4	3ª	18th	
1994–95	5	Terr. Pref.	4th	
1995–96	5	Terr. Pref.	4th	
1996–97	5	Terr. Pref.	5th	
1997–98	5	Terr. Pref.	1st	
1998–99	4	3ª	12th	
1999–2000	4	3ª	14th	
2000–01	4	3ª	17th	
2001–02	4	3ª	17th	
2002–03	5	Div. Hon.	6th	
2003–04	5	Div. Hon.	12th	
2004–05	5	Div. Hon.	8th	
2005–06	5	Div. Hon.	7th	
2006–07	5	Div. Hon.	10th	

Season	Tier	Division	Place	Copa del Rey
2007–08	5	Div. Hon.	11th	
2008–09	5	Div. Hon.	17th	
2009–10	6	Pref.	3rd	
2010–11	5	Div. Hon.	10th	
2011–12	5	Div. Hon.	9th	
2012–13	5	Div. Hon.	1st	
2013–14	4	3ª	19th	
2014–15	5	Div. Hon.	5th	
2015–16	5	Div. Hon.	1st	
2016–17	4	3ª	11th	
2017–18	4	3ª	10th	
2018–19	4	3ª	9th	
2019–20	4	3ª	11th	
2020–21	4	3ª	9th / 8th	
2021–22	6	Div. Hon.	9th	
2022–23	6	Div. Hon.	12th	
2023–24	6	Div. Hon.	5th	
2024–25	6	Div. Hon.	10th	
2025–26	6	Div. Hon.	2nd	
2026–27	5	3ª Fed.		

- 15 seasons in Tercera División
- 1 season in Tercera Federación
