= Universidad del País Vasco-Vasconia =

Spanish football club

UPV-Vasconia
- Full name: Universidad del País Vasco-Vasconia
- Nickname: UPV
- Founded: 1982
- Dissolved: 2010
- Ground: Martutene, San Sebastián, Basque Country, Spain
- Capacity: 500
- 2009–10: División de Honor, 17th of 18 (relegated)
Home colours	Away colours

Universidad del País Vasco-Vasconia was a Spanish football team based in San Sebastián, in the autonomous community of Basque Country. Founded in 1982, it last played in División de Honor, holding home matches at Campo de Fútbol de Martutene, with a capacity of 500 people.

== History ==
Founded in 1982 as Club Deportivo Zuzenbidea (Zuzenbide Kirol Elkartea in Basque), the club changed name to Universidad del País Vasco – Euskal Herriko Unibertsitatea in 1989. In 1995, the club achieved a first-ever promotion to Tercera División, suffering immediate relegation but returning at first attempt.

In 2004, after another relegation from the fourth division, UPV reached an agreement with Real Sociedad to become their second reserve team behind Real Sociedad B. The partnership helped the club to return to the fourth tier in their first year, but the affiliation ended in June 2006 due to economic reasons.

In 2007, again relegated from Tercera, UPV reached an agreement with CD Vasconia to act as their first team. After another relegation in 2010, the partnership ended after Vasconia wanting to create a senior team of their own, and UPV was subsequently dissolved.

== Season to season ==
Season	Tier	Division	Place	Copa del Rey
1982–83	7	2ª Reg.	1st	
1983–84	6	1ª Reg.	3rd	
1984–85	6	1ª Reg.	3rd	
1985–86	6	1ª Reg.	14th	
1986–87	6	1ª Reg.	1st	
1987–88	5	Reg. Pref.	3rd	
1988–89	5	Reg. Pref.	11th	
1989–90	5	Reg. Pref.	5th	
1990–91	5	Reg. Pref.	13th	
1991–92	5	Reg. Pref.	4th	
1992–93	5	Reg. Pref.	2nd	
1993–94	5	Reg. Pref.	5th	
1994–95	5	Reg. Pref.	2nd	
1995–96	4	3ª	19th	

Season	Tier	Division	Place	Copa del Rey
1996–97	5	Reg. Pref.	1st	
1997–98	4	3ª	14th	
1998–99	4	3ª	16th	
1999–2000	4	3ª	14th	
2000–01	4	3ª	15th	
2001–02	4	3ª	6th	
2002–03	4	3ª	15th	
2003–04	4	3ª	19th	
2004–05	5	Reg. Pref.	2nd	N/A (Note: Second reserve team of Real Sociedad.)
2005–06	4	3ª	10th	N/A
2006–07	4	3ª	19th	
2007–08	5	Reg. Pref.	15th (Note: Partnership with CD Vasconia.)	
2008–09	5	Reg. Pref.	13th	
2009–10	5	Div. Hon.	17th	

- 10 seasons in Tercera División
