= AD Ceutí Atlético =

Spanish football team

Ceutí Atlético
- Full name: Asociación Deportiva Ceutí Atlético
- Founded: 1994
- Ground: Miguel Indurain, Ceutí, Región de Murcia, Spain
- Capacity: 1,000
- Chairman: (Spain) Diego Ruiz
- Manager: (Spain) José Rodríguez
- League: Segunda Autonómica – Group 1
- 2024–25: Segunda Autonómica – Group 1, 10th of 12
Home colours	Away colours

Asociación Deportiva Ceutí Atlético is a football team based in Ceutí in the autonomous community of Region of Murcia. Founded in 1994, they play in Segunda Autonómica – Group 1, holding home matches at the Estadio Miguel Indurain, which has a capacity of 1,000.

== Season to season ==
Season	Tier	Division	Place	Copa del Rey
1994–95	6	1ª Reg.	4th	
1995–96	5	Reg. Pref.	17th	
1996–97	5	Terr. Pref.	7th	
1997–98	5	Terr. Pref.	6th	
1998–99	5	Terr. Pref.	2nd	
1999–2000	4	3ª	19th	
2000–01	5	Terr. Pref.	3rd	
2001–02	4	3ª	17th	
2002–03	5	Terr. Pref.	6th	
2003–04	5	Terr. Pref.	4th	
2004–05	5	Terr. Pref.	7th	
2005–06	5	Terr. Pref.	15th	
2006–07	5	Terr. Pref.	3rd	
2007–08	4	3ª	20th	
2008–09	5	Terr. Pref.	9th	
2009–10	5	Terr. Pref.	8th	
2010–11	5	Pref. Aut.	5th	
2011–12	5	Pref. Aut.	10th	
2012–2018	DNP			
2018–19	7	2ª Aut.	18th	

Season	Tier	Division	Place	Copa del Rey
2019–20	DNP			
2020–21	DNP			
2021–22	8	2ª Aut.	11th	
2022–23	8	2ª Aut.	4th	
2023–24	7	1ª Aut.	16th	
2024–25	8	2ª Aut.	10th	
2025–26	8	2ª Aut.		

- 3 seasons in Tercera División
