= AD Torpedo 66 =

Spanish football team

Torpedo 66
- Full name: Agrupación Deportiva Torpedo 66
- Founded: 1966
- Ground: Municipal de Cebolla, Cebolla, Castile-La Mancha, Spain
- Capacity: 2,000
- Chairman: (Spain) José Ramón Madrid
- Manager: (Spain) Juan Francisco Garrido
- League: Primera Autonómica Preferente – Group 2
- 2025–26: Primera Autonómica Preferente – Group 2, 6th of 18
Home colours	Away colours

Agrupación Deportiva Torpedo 66 is a Spanish football team based in Cebolla, Toledo, in the autonomous community of Castile-La Mancha. Founded in 1966, its plays in Primera Autonómica Preferente – Group 2. Torpedo's stadium is Estadio Municipal de Cebolla with capacity of 2,000 seats.

== Season to season ==
Season	Tier	Division	Place	Copa del Rey
1973–74	8	3ª Reg.	8th	
1974–75	8	3ª Reg.	3rd	
1975–76	7	3ª Reg. P.	5th	
1976–77	6	2ª Reg.	7th	
1977–78	7	2ª Reg.	14th	
1978–79	7	2ª Reg.	10th	
1979–80	7	2ª Reg.	12th	
1980–81	7	2ª Reg.	15th	
1981–82	8	3ª Reg. P.	6th	
1982–83	7	2ª Reg.	15th	
1983–84	7	2ª Reg.	17th	
1984–85	8	3ª Reg. P.	10th	
1985–86	8	3ª Reg. P.	16th	
1986–87	7	2ª Reg.	2nd	
1987–88	6	1ª Reg.	9th	
1988–89	6	1ª Reg.	2nd	
1989–90	6	1ª Reg.	12th	
1990–91	6	1ª Reg.	3rd	
1991–92	6	1ª Reg.	1st	
1992–93	5	Reg. Pref.	8th	

Season	Tier	Division	Place	Copa del Rey
1993–94	5	Reg. Pref.	7th	
1994–95	5	Reg. Pref.	2nd	
1995–96	5	1ª Aut.	1st	
1996–97	4	3ª	17th	
1997–98	4	3ª	8th	
1998–99	4	3ª	13th	
1999–2000	4	3ª	4th	
2000–01	4	3ª	16th	
2001–02	4	3ª	7th	
2002–03	4	3ª	7th	
2003–04	4	3ª	11th	
2004–05	4	3ª	19th	
2005–06	5	1ª Aut.	1st	
2006–07	4	3ª	19th	
2007–08	5	Aut. Pref.	2nd	
2008–09	4	3ª	18th	
2009–10	5	Aut. Pref.	3rd	
2010–11	5	Aut. Pref.	9th	
2011–12	5	Aut. Pref.	8th	
2012–13	5	Aut. Pref.	11th	

Season	Tier	Division	Place	Copa del Rey
2013–14	5	Aut. Pref.	4th	
2014–15	5	Aut. Pref.	7th	
2015–16	5	Aut. Pref.	5th	
2016–17	5	Aut. Pref.	10th	
2017–18	5	Aut. Pref.	6th	
2018–19	5	Aut. Pref.	16th	
2019–20	6	2ª Aut.	1st	
2020–21	5	Aut. Pref.	4th	
2021–22	6	Aut. Pref.	14th	
2022–23	7	2ª Aut.	1st	
2023–24	6	Aut. Pref.	8th	
2024–25	6	Aut. Pref.	8th	
2025–26	6	Aut. Pref.		

- 11 seasons in Tercera División
