= CD Piedrabuena =

Spanish football team

Piedrabuena
- Full name: Club Deportivo Piedrabuena
- Founded: 1973
- Ground: El Olivar, Piedrabuena, Castile-La Mancha, Spain
- Capacity: 5,000
- Chairman: (Spain) Pedro Fernández
- Manager: (Spain) Manuel Fernández
- League: Primera Autonómica – Group 2
- 2024–25: Primera Autonómica – Group 2, 14th of 16
Home colours	Away colours

Club Deportivo Piedrabuena is a Spanish football team based in Piedrabuena, in Ciudad Real in the autonomous community of Castile-La Mancha. Founded in 1981, its plays in Primera Autonómica – Group 2. The stadium is Estadio El Olivar with capacity of 1,500 seats.

== Season to season ==
Season	Tier	Division	Place	Copa del Rey
1973–74	9	3ª Reg.	9th	
1974–75	9	3ª Reg.	6th	
1975–76	7	3ª Reg. P.	10th	
1976–77	7	3ª Reg. P.	4th	
1977–78	8	3ª Reg. P.	15th	
1978–1982	DNP			
1982–83	9	3ª Reg.	7th	
1983–84	9	3ª Reg.	6th	
1984–85	9	3ª Reg.	7th	
1985–86	9	3ª Reg.	4th	
1986–87	7	2ª Reg.	6th	
1987–88	7	2ª Reg.	4th	
1988–89	7	2ª Reg.	2nd	
1989–90	7	2ª Reg.	3rd	
1990–91	6	1ª Reg.	6th	
1991–92	6	1ª Reg.	4th	
1992–93	6	1ª Reg.	1st	
1993–94	5	Reg. Pref.	6th	
1994–95	5	1ª Aut.	2nd	
1995–96	4	3ª	20th	

Season	Tier	Division	Place	Copa del Rey
1996–97	5	1ª Aut.	4th	
1997–98	5	1ª Aut.	2nd	
1998–99	4	3ª	8th	
1999–2000	4	3ª	15th	
2000–01	4	3ª	15th	
2001–02	4	3ª	18th	
2002–03	5	1ª Aut.	5th	
2003–04	5	1ª Aut.	6th	
2004–05	5	1ª Aut.	5th	
2005–06	5	1ª Aut.	11th	
2006–07	5	1ª Aut.	7th	
2007–08	5	Aut. Pref.	1st	
2008–09	4	3ª	10th	
2009–10	4	3ª	14th	
2010–11	4	3ª	19th	
2011–12	5	Aut. Pref.	6th	
2012–13	5	Aut. Pref.	9th	
2013–14	5	Aut. Pref.	10th	
2014–15	5	Aut. Pref.	17th	
2015–16	7	2ª Aut.	10th	

Season	Tier	Division	Place	Copa del Rey
2016–17	7	2ª Aut.	13th	
2017–18	7	2ª Aut.	10th	
2018–19	7	2ª Aut.	1st	
2019–20	6	1ª Aut.	7th	
2020–21	DNP			
2021–22	8	2ª Aut.	14th	
2022–23	8	2ª Aut.	3rd	
2023–24	8	2ª Aut.	1st	
2024–25	7	1ª Aut.	14th	
2025–26	7	1ª Aut.		

- 8 seasons in Tercera División
