= SD Colloto =

Spanish football club

Colloto
- logo
- Full name: Sociedad Deportiva Colloto
- Founded: 1987
- Ground: El Nora, Colloto, Asturias, Spain
- Capacity: 2,000
- Chairman: (Spain) Zoilo Llano Rubio
- Manager: (Spain) Francisco Zala Villa
- League: Segunda Asturfútbol – Group 2
- 2025–26: Segunda Asturfútbol – Group 2, 13th of 18
Home colours	Away colours

Sociedad Deportiva Colloto is a football team based in Colloto, a place between Siero and Oviedo, in the autonomous community of Asturias in Spain. The team plays in Segunda Asturfútbol – Group 2. The club's home ground is El Nora, which has a capacity of 2,000 spectators.

== History ==
Colloto was founded as a merger of three teams:

- Colloto CF
- Águila Negra
- CD Central Lechera

== Season to season ==
Season	Level	Division	Place	Copa del Rey
1987–88	6	1ª Reg.	16th	
1990–91	6	1ª Reg.	12th	
1989–90	6	1ª Reg.	18th	
1990–91	6	1ª Reg.	4th	
1991–92	6	1ª Reg.	3rd	
1992–93	5	Reg. Pref.	10th	
1993–94	5	Reg. Pref.	9th	
1994–95	5	Reg. Pref.	2nd	
1995–96	4	3ª	17th	
1996–97	4	3ª	16th	
1997–98	4	3ª	17th	
1998–99	4	3ª	9th	
1999–2000	4	3ª	16th	
2000–01	4	3ª	11th	
2001–02	4	3ª	7th	
2002–03	4	3ª	19th	
2003–04	5	Reg. Pref.	5th	
2004–05	5	Reg. Pref.	17th	
2005–06	5	Reg. Pref.	15th	
2006–07	5	Reg. Pref.	1st	

Season	Level	Division	Place	Copa del Rey
2007–08	4	3ª	20th	
2008–09	5	Reg. Pref.	2nd	
2009–10	4	3ª	18th	
2010–11	5	Reg. Pref.	2nd	
2011–12	4	3ª	20th	
2012–13	5	Reg. Pref.	18th	
2013–14	6	1ª Reg.	13th	
2014–15	6	1ª Reg.	4th	
2015–16	6	1ª Reg.	8th	
2016–17	6	1ª Reg.	4th	
2017–18	6	1ª Reg.	3rd	
2018–19	5	Reg. Pref.	14th	
2019–20	5	Reg. Pref.	13th	
2020–21	5	Reg. Pref.	14th	
2021–22	6	Reg. Pref.	6th	
2022–23	6	1ª RFFPA	15th	
2023–24	6	1ª Astur.	20th	
2024–25	7	2ª Astur.	10th	
2025–26	7	2ª Astur.		

- 11 seasons in Tercera División
