= Valencia CF C =

Spanish football team

Valencia C
- Full name: Valencia Club de Fútbol "C"
- Nickname(s): Los Che
- Founded: 1980 (as Gimnástico CF)
- Ground: Paterna, Valencia, Valencian Community, Spain
- Capacity: 2,300
- 2003–04: 3ª – Group 6, 7th of 20
Home colours	Away colours

Valencia Club de Fútbol "C", shortened to Valencia C, was the second reserve team of Valencia CF, behind Valencia CF Mestalla. It was a Spanish football club based in Valencia, in the namesake community.

== History ==
Founded in 1980 as Gimnástico Club de Fútbol, an honour to dissolved Gimnástico FC, the club played their first two seasons in the Tercera Regional, the lowest category of the regional leagues. After achieving promotion to the Segunda Regional, president Rafa Salom bought a place of another club in the Primera Regional, and the club subsequently played in that division before achieving promotion to the Regional Preferente in 1992.

Gimnástico achieved promotion to Tercera División in 1994. In 2002, the club was sold to Valencia CF, being renamed into Valencia CF C and becoming their second reserve team, behind Valencia CF Mestalla.

In 2004, after Mestalla was relegated to the fourth division, Valencia C ceased activities.

== Season-by-season ==
- As Gimnástico CF

Season	Tier	Division	Place	Copa del Rey
1980–81	8	3ª Reg.	12th	
1981–82	8	3ª Reg.	3rd	
1982–83	6	1ª Reg.	9th	
1983–84	6	1ª Reg.	12th	
1984–85	6	1ª Reg.	5th	
1985–86	6	1ª Reg.	3rd	
1986–87	6	1ª Reg.	10th	
1987–88	6	1ª Reg.	4th	
1988–89	6	1ª Reg.	6th	
1989–90	6	1ª Reg.	11th	
1990–91	6	1ª Reg.	4th	

Season	Tier	Division	Place	Copa del Rey
1991–92	6	1ª Reg.	1st	
1992–93	5	Reg. Pref.	5th	
1993–94	5	Reg. Pref.	1st	
1994–95	4	3ª	7th	
1995–96	4	3ª	10th	
1996–97	4	3ª	14th	
1997–98	4	3ª	9th	
1998–99	4	3ª	12th	
1999–2000	4	3ª	16th	
2000–01	4	3ª	8th	
2001–02	4	3ª	7th	

- As Valencia CF C

Season	Tier	Division	Place
2002–03	4	3ª	14th
2003–04	4	3ª	7th

- 10 seasons in Tercera División
