= 2000–01 Tercera División =

Tercera División
- Season: 2000–2001
- Dates: August 2000–June 2001
- Matches: 12,920

The 2000–2001 Tercera División season is the 24th season since establishment the tier four.

== Group I ==
Pos	Team	Pld	W	D	L	GF	GA	GD	Pts
1	Celta de Vigo B	38	22	13	3	73	25	+48	79
2	CD Endesa As Pontes	38	18	14	6	52	31	+21	68
3	Ponte Ourense CF	38	19	9	10	60	48	+12	66
4	UD Xove Lago	38	19	8	11	57	40	+17	65
5	Alondras CF	38	17	13	8	61	36	+25	64
6	SD Compostela B	38	16	13	9	56	42	+14	61
7	Betanzos CF	38	15	12	11	47	34	+13	57
8	Club Lemos	38	15	11	12	50	44	+6	56
9	Verín CF	38	17	4	17	44	46	−2	55
10	CD Lalín	38	13	14	11	45	33	+12	53
11	Viveiro CF	38	14	11	13	45	47	−2	53
12	Porriño Industrial FC	38	14	9	15	49	59	−10	51
13	Racing Club Villalbés	38	13	11	14	59	57	+2	50
14	Rápido de Bouzas	38	11	13	14	51	53	−2	46
15	CD Grove	38	11	13	14	43	61	−18	46
16	Gondomar CF	38	11	7	20	42	63	−21	40
17	CCD Cerceda	38	8	16	14	38	53	−15	40
18	SCD Malpica (R)	38	9	9	20	62	79	−17	36
19	Sporting Pontenova (R)	38	6	9	23	43	82	−39	27
20	Caselas FC (R)	38	4	7	27	30	74	−44	19

(R) Relegated

== Group II ==
Pos	Team	Pld	W	D	L	GF	GA	GD	Pts
1	Marino de Luanco	38	26	4	8	77	28	+49	82
2	Real Oviedo B	38	23	9	6	66	28	+38	78
3	UP Langreo	38	24	4	10	75	33	+42	76
4	CD Lealtad	38	23	6	9	69	40	+29	75
5	Club Astur	38	16	12	10	60	40	+20	60
6	Navia CF	38	15	14	9	58	50	+8	59
7	Real Avilés Industrial	38	16	8	14	56	43	+13	56
8	Real Titánico	38	15	11	12	50	55	−5	56
9	CD San Martín	38	15	10	13	61	47	+14	55
10	CD Turón	38	14	8	16	46	50	−4	50
11	SD Colloto	38	12	11	15	47	39	+8	47
12	CD Mosconia	38	12	11	15	53	48	+5	47
13	Pumarín CF	38	11	12	15	37	56	−19	45
14	Valdesoto CF	38	11	11	16	54	73	−19	44
15	Ribadesella CF	38	10	12	16	41	63	−22	42
16	Deportiva Piloñesa	38	10	10	18	48	62	−14	40
17	CD Llanes	38	11	6	21	41	69	−28	39
18	CD Trasona (R)	38	10	9	19	35	60	−25	39
19	CD Tuilla (R)	38	8	13	17	40	69	−29	37
20	CD Covadonga (R)	38	5	5	28	29	90	−61	20

(R) Relegated

== Group III ==
Pos	Team	Pld	W	D	L	GF	GA	GD	Pts
1	SD Noja	36	28	4	4	78	20	+58	88
2	CD Laredo	36	22	7	7	77	43	+34	73
3	SD Textil Escudo	36	21	7	8	53	24	+29	70
4	CD Bezana	36	18	12	6	57	27	+30	66
5	Atlético Deva	36	18	7	11	53	36	+17	61
6	CD Cayón	36	18	7	11	47	34	+13	61
7	Velarde CF	36	11	17	8	35	26	+9	50
8	CF Ribamontán	36	12	12	12	38	42	−4	48
9	SD Barreda Balompié	36	12	11	13	43	47	−4	47
10	UM Escobedo	36	13	7	16	39	47	−8	46
11	Ayrón CF	36	12	10	14	42	53	−11	46
12	Rayo Cantabria	36	12	4	20	51	62	−11	40
13	Santoña CF	36	11	7	18	36	52	−16	40
14	SD Atlético Albericia	36	11	6	19	39	63	−24	39
15	Castro CF	36	10	9	17	51	65	−14	39
16	CD Guarnizo (R)	36	9	12	15	38	52	−14	39
17	CD Naval (R)	36	10	8	18	38	48	−10	38
18	SD Revilla (R)	36	9	11	16	32	53	−21	38
19	SD Villaescusa (R)	36	3	6	27	31	84	−53	15

(R) Relegated

Note: CD Miengo resigned to playing in the group on economic grounds.

== Group IV ==
Pos	Team	Pld	W	D	L	GF	GA	GD	Pts
1	SD Lemona	38	28	8	2	83	24	+59	92
2	Real Sociedad B	38	22	9	7	65	28	+37	75
3	Sestao River Club	38	22	7	9	62	24	+38	73
4	CD Aurrerá Ondarroa	38	19	8	11	63	53	+10	65
5	Zamudio SD	38	20	4	14	59	48	+11	64
6	CD Baskonia	38	16	8	14	65	59	+6	56
7	Arenas Club de Getxo	38	13	13	12	52	41	+11	52
8	SCD Durango	38	16	4	18	52	57	−5	52
9	Deportivo Alavés C	38	12	14	12	38	37	+1	50
10	Zalla UC	38	12	13	13	33	36	−3	49
11	Club Bermeo	38	14	5	19	46	49	−3	47
12	SD San Pedro	38	12	9	17	40	41	−1	45
13	SD Amorebieta	38	10	15	13	40	57	−17	45
14	Real Unión B	38	12	9	17	42	51	−9	45
15	Universidad PV	38	12	9	17	40	49	−9	45
16	Aurrerá Vitoria B	38	11	11	16	35	42	−7	44
17	Sodupe UC	38	11	10	17	29	65	−36	43
18	CD Hernani (R)	38	9	12	17	31	51	−20	39
19	Bergara KE (R)	38	11	5	22	33	61	−28	38
20	CD Lagún Onak (R)	38	8	7	23	35	70	−35	31

(R) Relegated

== Group V ==
Pos	Team	Pld	W	D	L	GF	GA	GD	Pts
1	CF Gavà	38	21	12	5	73	37	+36	75
2	CF Balaguer	38	21	11	6	64	32	+32	74
3	CD Europa	38	17	12	9	62	48	+14	63
4	Palamós CF	38	16	13	9	66	42	+24	61
5	FC Barcelona C	38	16	10	12	57	40	+17	58
6	UE Vilassar	38	17	7	14	56	58	−2	58
7	AEC Manlleu	38	15	11	12	52	58	−6	56
8	Girona FC	38	13	16	9	46	38	+8	55
9	CF Palafrugell	38	16	5	17	57	55	+2	53
10	AD Guíxols	38	13	13	12	62	66	−4	52
11	UE Tàrrega	38	13	12	13	52	53	−1	51
12	UE Badaloní	38	13	12	13	48	48	0	51
13	UE Sant Andreu	38	13	10	15	46	58	−12	49
14	CF Reus Deportiu	38	11	14	13	45	43	+2	47
15	UE Cornellà	38	11	11	16	41	58	−17	44
16	CE Júpiter	38	9	16	13	49	49	0	43
17	CD Tortosa (R)	38	10	12	16	46	65	−19	42
18	FC Santboià (R)	38	9	10	19	39	54	−15	37
19	Vilobí CF (R)	38	8	11	19	52	72	−20	35
20	CD Banyoles (R)	38	5	8	25	37	76	−39	23

(R) Relegated

== Group VI ==
Pos	Team	Pld	W	D	L	GF	GA	GD	Pts
1	Alicante CF	38	28	6	4	89	29	+60	90
2	Valencia CF B	38	23	9	6	96	30	+66	78
3	CD Onda	38	21	10	7	80	43	+37	73
4	Pego CF	38	20	10	8	61	40	+21	70
5	Levante UD B	38	18	12	8	47	34	+13	66
6	Burjassot CF	38	18	11	9	57	44	+13	65
7	Santa Pola CF	38	17	7	14	49	43	+6	58
8	Gimnástico CF	38	15	10	13	48	52	−4	55
9	CD Eldense	38	14	13	11	56	44	+12	55
10	Pinoso CF	38	14	10	14	41	38	+3	52
11	Torrellano CF	38	11	10	17	42	52	−10	43
12	UD Vall d'Uixó	38	10	13	15	38	52	−14	43
13	CD Castellón B	38	10	13	15	48	61	−13	43
14	Elche CF B	38	11	9	18	43	68	−25	42
15	Vinaròs CF	38	10	12	16	39	63	−24	42
16	Ontinyent CF	38	11	8	19	31	57	−26	41
17	CD Alcoyano	38	10	10	18	38	54	−16	40
18	CD Denia (R)	38	10	6	22	36	59	−23	36
19	Foios CD (R)	38	6	11	21	31	57	−26	29
20	CD Buñol (R)	38	4	8	26	24	74	−50	20

(R) Relegated

== Group VII ==
Pos	Team	Pld	W	D	L	GF	GA	GD	Pts
1	CF Rayo Majadahonda	38	25	6	7	86	43	+43	81
2	CD Las Rozas	38	22	9	7	58	34	+24	75
3	CD Móstoles	38	22	7	9	71	33	+38	73
4	Real Madrid CF C (Note: Real Madrid played on 2ªB, excluded from the play-off.)	38	21	7	10	81	55	+26	70
5	RSD Alcalá	38	19	12	7	56	40	+16	69
6	DAV Santa Ana	38	18	10	10	59	42	+17	64
7	AD Parla	38	18	9	11	68	49	+19	63
8	CD Coslada	38	16	8	14	49	39	+10	56
9	Rayo Vallecano B	38	14	11	13	54	45	+9	53
10	Real Aranjuez CF	38	13	11	14	51	53	−2	50
11	Atlético Pinto	38	13	11	14	45	62	−17	50
12	CD Puerta Bonita	38	13	9	16	47	51	−4	48
13	CD Leganés B	38	12	10	16	39	60	−21	46
14	CDA Navalcarnero	38	9	15	14	29	40	−11	42
15	CD Pegaso	38	11	9	18	38	46	−8	42
16	CD San Fernando	38	9	11	18	33	49	−16	38
17	CD Colonia Moscardó (R)	38	9	10	19	45	61	−16	37
18	Getafe CF B (R)	38	8	10	20	41	64	−23	34
19	Atlético Aviación (R)	38	7	11	20	41	65	−24	32
20	Atlético Cercedilla (R)	38	5	6	27	24	84	−60	21

(R) Relegated

== Group VIII ==
Pos	Team	Pld	W	D	L	GF	GA	GD	Pts
1	C.F. Palencia	38	22	8	8	76	35	+41	74
2	Real Valladolid C.F. B	38	22	7	9	61	28	+33	73
3	U.D. Salamanca B	38	20	10	8	64	20	+44	70
4	S.D. Gim. Segoviana	38	20	7	11	65	46	+19	67
5	S.D. Gim. Medinense	38	19	9	10	69	38	+31	66
6	La Bañeza F.C.	38	19	8	11	66	49	+17	65
7	Norma S.L. F.C.	38	16	8	14	47	39	+8	56
8	U.D. Santa Marta	38	16	7	15	50	48	+2	55
9	C.D. Benavente	38	16	7	15	44	50	−6	55
10	S.D. Hullera V.L.	38	13	14	11	43	37	+6	53
11	A.D. Las Navas	38	14	10	14	45	52	−7	52
12	C.D. Becerril	38	15	7	16	48	54	−6	52
13	C.D. Béjar Ind.	38	13	10	15	46	52	−6	49
14	C.D. Laguna	38	12	12	14	50	61	−11	48
15	Cult. Dep. Leonesa B	38	12	10	16	46	53	−7	46
16	C.At. Bembibre	38	13	7	18	47	48	−1	46
17	C.D. Venta Baños (R)	38	9	10	19	27	67	−40	37
18	At. Astorga F.C. (R)	38	7	12	19	33	59	−26	33
19	Arandina C.F. (R)	38	7	6	25	33	79	−46	27
20	Racing Lermeño C.F. (R)	38	5	11	22	28	73	−45	26

(R) Relegated

== Group IX ==
Pos	Team	Pld	W	D	L	GF	GA	GD	Pts
1	U.D. Marbella	38	22	9	7	67	35	+32	75
2	Málaga C.F. B	38	21	11	6	70	31	+39	74
3	Torredonjimeno C.F.	38	21	11	6	57	32	+25	74
4	C.P. Granada 74	38	19	11	8	61	33	+28	68
5	U.D. Maracena	38	18	13	7	50	28	+22	67
6	C.D. Alhaurino	38	18	10	10	47	33	+14	64
7	Vandalia Ind.	38	16	9	13	51	43	+8	57
8	Roquetas C.D.	38	13	14	11	54	42	+12	53
9	C.D. Mármol Macael	38	15	8	15	50	46	+4	53
10	Loja C.D.	38	13	13	12	47	44	+3	52
11	Arenas C. y D. C.F.	38	13	12	13	50	60	−10	51
12	Vélez C.F.	38	12	9	17	46	51	−5	45
13	Úbeda C.F.	38	11	11	16	48	50	−2	44
14	U.D. San Pedro	38	11	9	18	49	57	−8	42
15	Antequera C.F.	38	10	12	16	39	49	−10	42
16	C.D. Iliturgi	38	11	7	20	40	53	−13	40
17	Juventud Torremolinos	38	10	9	19	39	69	−30	39
18	C.D. Imperio Alb. (R)	38	9	9	20	35	51	−16	36
19	C.D. Los Boliches (R)	38	6	15	17	33	68	−35	33
20	U.D. Fuengirola (R)	38	6	8	24	28	86	−58	26

(R) Relegated

== Group X ==
Pos	Team	Pld	W	D	L	GF	GA	GD	Pts
1	Sevilla F.C. B	38	27	8	3	88	24	+64	89
2	Real Betis Balompié B	38	19	10	9	55	35	+20	67
3	C. At. Lucentino Ind.	38	18	9	11	66	50	+16	63
4	At. Sanluqueño CF.	38	16	13	9	67	51	+16	61
5	Jerez Ind. C.F.	38	16	12	10	55	44	+11	60
6	A.D. San José	38	16	10	12	54	44	+10	58
7	R.C. Recr. Huelva B	38	17	6	15	37	33	+4	57
8	Córdoba C.F. B	38	13	16	9	46	37	+9	55
9	U.D. Los Palacios	38	13	12	13	46	43	+3	51
10	Ayamonte C.F.	38	12	13	13	46	44	+2	49
11	C.D. Pozoblanco	38	11	14	13	43	50	−7	47
12	Racing C. Portuense	38	11	14	13	36	45	−9	47
13	C.D. Villanueva	38	9	17	12	30	43	−13	44
14	Puerto Real C.F.	38	11	9	18	40	54	−14	42
15	A.D. Cartaya	38	11	8	19	40	59	−19	41
16	U.D. Los Barrios	38	9	13	16	40	61	−21	40
17	U.D. Tomares	38	9	12	17	34	50	−16	39
18	Chiclana C.F. (R)	38	9	12	17	34	56	−22	39
19	La Palma C.F. (R)	38	7	16	15	44	55	−11	37
20	Serrallo C.F. (R)	38	7	14	17	36	59	−23	35

(R) Relegated

== Group XI ==
Pos	Team	Pld	W	D	L	GF	GA	GD	Pts
1	CD Atlético Baleares	38	27	8	3	77	27	+50	89
2	C.D. Ferriolense (Note: RCD Mallorca B is playing in Segunda División B, excluded from the play-off because is the 2nd reserve team of RCD Mallorca)	38	23	10	5	90	34	+56	79
3	C.F. Villafranca	38	18	11	9	64	37	+27	65
4	C.D. Manacor	38	20	4	14	71	49	+22	64
5	C.D. Constancia	38	17	10	11	58	46	+12	61
6	P.D. Santa Eulalia	38	18	6	14	50	35	+15	60
7	C.D. Binisalem	38	14	15	9	49	48	+1	57
8	C.D. Cardessar	38	16	8	14	64	44	+20	56
9	Recr. C.D. Santa Ponsa	38	16	7	15	51	49	+2	55
10	C.D. Playas Calvià	38	15	8	15	47	52	−5	53
11	U.D. Poblense	38	15	8	15	50	43	+7	53
12	C.D. Alayor	38	14	5	19	38	48	−10	47
13	C.D. Montuiri	38	13	8	17	44	71	−27	47
14	C.F. Sporting Mahonés	38	12	8	18	53	65	−12	44
15	C.E. Eivissa	38	11	11	16	49	66	−17	44
16	CF Sóller	38	11	8	19	47	71	−24	41
17	C.D. España Llucmajor	38	12	3	23	37	71	−34	39
18	At. Ciutadella C.F. (R)	38	11	5	22	44	72	−28	38
19	C.E. Montaura (R)	38	9	11	18	46	63	−17	38
20	C.F. Pollença (R)	38	6	10	22	40	78	−38	28

(R) Relegated

== Group XII ==
Pos	Team	Pld	W	D	L	GF	GA	GD	Pts
1	U.D. Lanzarote	38	24	11	3	78	26	+52	83
2	S.D. Tenisca	38	22	5	11	66	47	+19	71
3	U.D. Las Palmas B	38	21	7	10	70	45	+25	70
4	C.D. San Isidro	38	20	10	8	62	32	+30	70
5	Castillo C.F.	38	21	7	10	60	48	+12	70
6	C.D. Corralejo	38	19	7	12	52	33	+19	64
7	C.D. La Oliva	38	18	9	11	67	48	+19	63
8	U.D. Gáldar	38	16	10	12	52	43	+9	58
9	C.D. Tenerife B	38	16	6	16	48	43	+5	54
10	C.D. Orientación Marítima	38	14	5	19	50	54	−4	47
11	U.D. Tenerife Sur Ibarra	38	14	5	19	47	55	−8	47
12	U.D. Telde	38	12	11	15	34	37	−3	47
13	C.D. Victoria	38	13	4	21	42	67	−25	43
14	U.D. Las Zocas	38	13	4	21	50	75	−25	43
15	A.D. Laguna	38	10	12	16	27	39	−12	42
16	C.F. Unión Carrizal	38	10	11	17	37	56	−19	41
17	C.D. La Angostura	38	9	13	16	43	55	−12	40
18	U.D. Orotava (R)	38	10	10	18	41	59	−18	40
19	C.D. Doramas (R)	38	8	13	17	41	57	−16	37
20	U.D. Realejos (R)	38	6	8	24	34	82	−48	26

(R) Relegated

== Group XIII ==
Pos	Team	Pld	W	D	L	GF	GA	GD	Pts
1	C.F. Ciudad Murcia	42	30	9	3	87	20	+67	99
2	Orihuela C.F.	42	30	8	4	102	25	+77	98
3	Yeclano C.F.	42	28	10	4	95	29	+66	94
4	Lorca C.F.	42	29	6	7	104	35	+69	93
5	A.D. Mar Menor	42	26	7	9	82	40	+42	85
6	Águilas C.F.	42	20	13	9	65	43	+22	73
7	Sangonera At. C.F.	42	21	7	14	58	48	+10	70
8	A.D. Relesa Las Palas	42	18	15	9	77	44	+33	69
9	C.D. Bala Azul	42	16	13	13	71	57	+14	61
10	Real Murcia C.F. B	42	17	6	19	66	65	+1	57
11	U.D. Horadada	42	17	6	19	64	70	−6	57
12	Mazarrón C.F.	42	16	7	19	48	65	−17	55
13	Jumilla C.F.	42	14	8	20	49	67	−18	50
14	UCAM	42	13	7	22	48	76	−28	46
15	Caravaca C.F.	42	12	9	21	45	67	−22	45
16	C.D. Molinense	42	11	11	20	51	71	−20	44
17	C.D. Alquerías	42	12	5	25	36	67	−31	41
18	Olímpico Totana C.F. (R)	42	8	11	23	40	93	−53	35
19	C.D. Alhameño (R)	42	9	7	26	41	89	−48	34
20	C.D. Cieza (R)	42	8	8	26	40	90	−50	32
21	Pinatar C.F. - E.M.F (R)	42	8	7	27	40	101	−61	31
22	C.D. Lumbreras (R)	42	4	10	28	35	82	−47	22

(R) Relegated

== Group XIV ==
Pos	Team	Pld	W	D	L	GF	GA	GD	Pts
1	C.D. Díter Zafra	38	24	8	6	69	25	+44	80
2	U.D. Mérida	38	23	10	5	88	29	+59	79
3	U.P. Plasencia	38	25	4	9	66	36	+30	79
4	C.P. Cacereño	38	25	3	10	75	26	+49	78
5	Moralo C.P.	38	22	11	5	62	21	+41	77
6	C.F. Villanovense	38	18	11	9	70	35	+35	65
7	C.D. Coria	38	17	8	13	46	44	+2	59
8	C.D. Badajoz B	38	14	14	10	49	39	+10	56
9	A.D. Cerro Reyes At.	38	14	11	13	49	44	+5	53
10	U. Cult. La Estrella	38	16	5	17	44	46	−2	53
11	C.D. Valdelacalzada	38	15	7	16	35	46	−11	52
12	C.P. Monesterio	38	14	10	14	44	45	−1	52
13	S.P. Villafranca	38	12	10	16	48	59	−11	46
14	C.D. Santa Amalia	38	14	4	20	35	53	−18	46
15	C.F. Extremadura B	38	12	10	16	53	56	−3	46
16	U.D. Montijo	38	12	6	20	30	66	−36	42
17	C.P. Moraleja	38	8	11	19	34	61	−27	35
18	C.D. Grabasa Burguillos (R)	38	6	9	23	33	67	−34	27
19	Sanvicenteño F.C. (R)	38	6	6	26	31	85	−54	24
20	C.D. Castuera (R)	38	1	6	31	19	97	−78	9

(R) Relegated

== Group XV ==
Pos	Team	Pld	W	D	L	GF	GA	GD	Pts
1	CD Logroñés	38	27	5	6	72	26	+46	86
2	CD Mirandés	38	23	6	9	61	32	+29	75
3	CD Alfaro	38	19	12	7	59	40	+19	69
4	CD Izarra	38	18	14	6	54	39	+15	68
5	CD Valle de Egüés	38	20	8	10	66	41	+25	68
6	CA River Ebro	38	18	6	14	60	45	+15	60
7	CD Azkoyen	38	15	11	12	55	44	+11	56
8	CD Aluvión	38	14	11	13	52	57	−5	53
9	CD Tudelano	38	14	9	15	51	45	+6	51
10	Haro Deportivo	38	14	9	15	45	45	0	51
11	CD Beti Onak	38	15	6	17	49	55	−6	51
12	CD Urroztarra	38	15	6	17	55	53	+2	51
13	CD Agoncillo	38	14	8	16	45	52	−7	50
14	CD Aoiz	38	12	7	19	35	51	−16	43
15	CD Oberena	38	12	7	19	41	60	−19	43
16	UCD Burladés	38	9	13	16	38	51	−13	40
17	CD Idoya	38	10	9	19	44	56	−12	39
18	CA Artajonés (R)	38	11	6	21	44	66	−22	39
19	CD Arnedo (R)	38	5	15	18	34	67	−33	30
20	CCD Alberite (R)	38	6	10	22	25	60	−35	28

(R) Relegated

== Group XVI ==
Pos	Team	Pld	W	D	L	GF	GA	GD	Pts
1	C.D. Teruel	40	26	5	9	83	45	+38	83
2	C.F. Figueruelas	40	22	12	6	68	32	+36	78
3	U.D. Fraga	40	22	10	8	75	33	+42	76
4	S.D. Huesca	40	21	12	7	69	35	+34	75
5	C.D. Endesa And.	40	21	11	8	73	43	+30	74
6	C.D. Zuera	40	20	11	9	68	42	+26	71
7	Utebo F.C.	40	20	9	11	65	40	+25	69
8	Villanueva de Gállego C.F.	40	20	7	13	64	61	+3	67
9	U.D. Barbastro	40	18	5	17	54	56	−2	59
10	U.D. Alcampel	40	16	13	11	58	52	+6	58 (Note: 3 points deducted)
11	U.D. Casetas	40	15	10	15	51	40	+11	55
12	C.D. Ebro	40	13	12	15	50	56	−6	51
13	C.D. San Gregorio	40	13	10	17	44	58	−14	49
14	C.D. Sariñena	40	11	12	17	35	47	−12	45
15	F.C. Lalueza	40	11	9	20	38	68	−30	42
16	C.D. La Almunia	40	11	9	20	53	71	−18	42
17	C.D. Fuentes	40	10	10	20	50	71	−21	40
18	S.D. Ejea (R)	40	10	9	21	51	77	−26	39
19	C.F. Jacetano (R)	40	11	4	25	33	68	−35	37
20	C.D.J. Peralta (R)	40	8	7	25	30	71	−41	31
21	C.D. Tamarite (R)	40	4	7	29	31	77	−46	19

(R) Relegated

== Group XVII ==
Pos	Team	Pld	W	D	L	GF	GA	GD	Pts
1	CD Quintanar del Rey	38	24	9	5	57	21	+36	81
2	CP Villarrobledo	38	24	6	8	63	25	+38	78
3	Hellín Deportivo	38	22	12	4	66	20	+46	78
4	CD Cuenca	38	19	9	10	48	34	+14	66
5	CD Guadalajara	38	18	9	11	69	42	+27	63
6	Albacete Balompié B	38	18	9	11	56	35	+21	63
7	UD Almansa	38	17	10	11	56	35	+21	61
8	Tomelloso CF	38	16	13	9	55	35	+20	61
9	UD Puertollano	38	15	11	12	59	44	+15	56
10	CF Gimnástico de Alcázar	38	16	8	14	42	36	+6	56
11	UD Talavera	38	15	8	15	31	44	−13	53
12	Sporting Cabanillas	38	15	6	17	41	63	−22	51
13	CF Valdepeñas	38	14	7	17	43	42	+1	49
14	CD Torrijos	38	11	16	11	47	42	+5	49
15	CD Piedrabuena	38	12	10	16	44	57	−13	46
16	AD Torpedo 66	38	9	12	17	32	49	−17	39
17	Manzanares CF	38	9	5	24	43	71	−28	32
18	AD Campillo (R)	38	4	15	19	26	55	−29	27
19	UD Socuéllamos (R)	38	6	7	25	20	75	−55	25
20	CD Bolañego (R)	38	1	8	29	18	91	−73	11

(R) Relegated

== Promotion play-off ==
Source:
