= Joyce Moreno (footballer) =

Spanish footballer (born 1974)

Personal information
- Full name: Joyce Renato Moreno Venecia
- Date of birth: 29 September 1974 (age 52)
- Place of birth: Panama City, Panama
- Height: 1.82 m (6 ft 0 in)
- Position: Defender

Youth career
- Real Madrid

Senior career*
Years	Team	Apps	(Gls)
1993–1997	Real Madrid B	102	(3)
1997–1999	Oviedo	47	(0)
1999–2000	→ Leganés (loan)	33	(0)
2001–2002	Burgos	33	(0)
2002–2004	Alcalá	35	(0)
2003	→ Badajoz (loan)	12	(1)
2004–2005	Santa Ana		
2005–2007	Granada	67	(2)
2007–2008	Sant Andreu		
Total		329	(6)

International career
1990–1991	Spain U16	14	(1)
1991	Spain U17	5	(1)
1991–1993	Spain U18	5	(0)
Medal record
Men's football
Representing Spain
FIFA World U-17
Runner-up	1991 Italy
- * Club domestic league appearances and goals

Joyce Renato Moreno Venecia (born 29 September 1974) is a Spanish retired footballer who played as a defender.

== Club career ==
Moreno was born in Panama City. During his career the Real Madrid youth graduate (having appeared only for their reserves as a senior), represented Real Oviedo – appearing in 27 matches during the 1997–98 season in his first La Liga experience – CD Leganés, Burgos CF, RSD Alcalá, CD Badajoz, DAV Santa Ana, Granada CF and UE Sant Andreu.

Moreno made his debut in the Spanish top division on 7 September 1997, playing the full 90 minutes for Oviedo in a 3–3 away draw against Real Zaragoza. He retired in June 2008, aged 33.

== Honours ==
Granada

- Tercera División: 2005–06

Spain U17

- FIFA U-17 World Cup runner-up: 1991
