= DAV Santa Ana =

Association football club in Spain

Santa Ana
- Full name: Deportivo Asociación de Vecinos Santa Ana
- Founded: 1974
- Ground: Polideportivo Santa Ana, Madrid, Madrid, Spain
- Capacity: 2,000
- President: Rafael González
- Head coach: Jesús Lucas
- League: Preferente de Aficionados – Group 1
- 2024–25: Preferente de Aficionados – Group 1, 4th of 18
| Home colours | Away colours |

Deportivo Asociación de Vecinos Santa Ana is a Spanish football team based in Madrid, in the namesake community. Founded in 1974 it plays in Preferente de Aficionados – Group 1, holding home games at Polideportivo Santa Ana, which has a capacity of 2,000 spectators.

== History ==
=== Club background ===
- Deportivo Santana Club de Fútbol (1974–1985)
- Deportivo Santana-Madrid Oeste (1985–1987)
- Depoortivo Santa Ana Club de Fútbol (1987–1991)
- Deportivo Asociación de Vecinos Santa Ana (1991–)

== Season to season ==
| Season | Tier | Division | Place | Copa del Rey |
|---|---|---|---|---|
| 1975–76 | 8 | 3ª Reg. | 12th | |
| 1976–77 | 8 | 3ª Reg. | 14th | |
| 1977–78 | 9 | 3ª Reg. | 13th | |
| 1978–79 | 9 | 3ª Reg. | 12th | |
| 1979–80 | 9 | 3ª Reg. | 10th | |
| 1980–81 | 9 | 3ª Reg. | 5th | |
| 1981–82 | 9 | 3ª Reg. | 1st | |
| 1982–83 | 8 | 3ª Reg. P. | 1st | |
| 1983–84 | 7 | 2ª Reg. | 10th | |
| 1984–85 | 7 | 2ª Reg. | 5th | |
| 1985–86 | 7 | 2ª Reg. | 6th | |
| 1986–87 | 6 | 1ª Reg. | 14th | |
| 1987–88 | 6 | 1ª Reg. | 9th | |
| 1988–89 | 6 | 1ª Reg. | 2nd | |
| 1989–90 | 5 | Reg. Pref. | 2nd | |
| 1990–91 | 4 | 3ª | 17th | |
| 1991–92 | 5 | Reg. Pref. | 2nd | |
| 1992–93 | 4 | 3ª | 15th | |
| 1993–94 | 4 | 3ª | 9th | |
| 1994–95 | 4 | 3ª | 1st | |

| Season | Tier | Division | Place | Copa del Rey |
|---|---|---|---|---|
| 1995–96 | 3 | 2ª B | 20th | First round |
| 1996–97 | 4 | 3ª | 2nd | |
| 1997–98 | 4 | 3ª | 10th | |
| 1998–99 | 4 | 3ª | 5th | |
| 1999–2000 | 4 | 3ª | 3rd | |
| 2000–01 | 4 | 3ª | 6th | |
| 2001–02 | 4 | 3ª | 9th | |
| 2002–03 | 4 | 3ª | 16th | |
| 2003–04 | 4 | 3ª | 11th | |
| 2004–05 | 4 | 3ª | 12th | |
| 2005–06 | 4 | 3ª | 14th | |
| 2006–07 | 4 | 3ª | 19th | |
| 2007–08 | 5 | Reg. Pref. | 2nd | |
| 2008–09 | 4 | 3ª | 12th | |
| 2009–10 | 4 | 3ª | 18th | |
| 2010–11 | 5 | Pref. | 9th | |
| 2011–12 | 5 | Pref. | 2nd | |
| 2012–13 | 4 | 3ª | 20th | |
| 2013–14 | 5 | Pref. | 17th | |
| 2014–15 | 6 | 1ª Afic. | 1st | |

| Season | Tier | Division | Place | Copa del Rey |
|---|---|---|---|---|
| 2015–16 | 5 | Pref. | 2nd | |
| 2016–17 | 4 | 3ª | 10th | |
| 2017–18 | 4 | 3ª | 15th | |
| 2018–19 | 4 | 3ª | 11th | |
| 2019–20 | 4 | 3ª | 11th | |
| 2020–21 | 4 | 3ª | 12th / 11th | |
| 2021–22 | 6 | Pref. | 17th | |
| 2022–23 | 7 | 1ª Afic. | 7th | |
| 2023–24 | 7 | 1ª Afic. | 8th | |
| 2024–25 | 7 | Pref. Afic. | 4th | |
| 2025–26 | 7 | Pref. Afic. | | |

- 1 season in Segunda División B
- 23 seasons in Tercera División

== Former players ==
- (Morocco) Munir El Haddadi
- (Spain) David Mateos
- (Panama) Joyce Moreno
- (Spain) Fernando Morientes
- (Spain) Derik Osede
- (Spain) Juan Quero
