= Miengo FC =

Association football club in Spain

Miengo
- Full name: Miengo Fútbol Club
- Founded: 1968 (as Club Deportivo Miengo)
- Ground: Campo Miengo
- Capacity: 1,000
- Chairman: César Pérez
- Manager: José Francisco Pozueta
- League: Primera Regional
- 2025–26: Primera Regional, 6th of 18
Home colours	Away colours

Miengo Fútbol Club is a Spanish football club based in Miengo, Cantabria. Founded in 1968, it plays in Primera Regional, holding home games at Campo Miengo, with a capacity of 1,000 people.

== Season to season ==
Season	Tier	Division	Place	Copa del Rey
1968–69	5	2ª Reg.	10th	
1969–70	5	2ª Reg.	6th	
1970–71	5	2ª Reg.	6th	
1971–72	5	2ª Reg.	8th	
1972–73	5	2ª Reg.	16th	
1973–74	6	3ª Reg.	3rd	
1974–75	5	1ª Reg.	14th	
1975–76	5	1ª Reg.	13th	
1976–77	6	2ª Reg.	5th	
1977–78	7	2ª Reg.	9th	
1978–79	7	2ª Reg.	7th	
1979–80	6	1ª Reg.	20th	
1980–81	7	2ª Reg.	9th	
1981–82	7	2ª Reg.	3rd	
1982–83	6	1ª Reg.	12th	
1983–84	6	1ª Reg.	18th	
1984–85	7	2ª Reg.	1st	
1985–86	6	1ª Reg.	7th	
1986–87	6	1ª Reg.	14th	
1987–88	6	1ª Reg.	16th	

Season	Tier	Division	Place	Copa del Rey
1988–89	6	1ª Reg.	8th	
1989–90	6	1ª Reg.	8th	
1990–91	6	1ª Reg.	5th	
1991–92	6	1ª Reg.	4th	
1992–93	6	1ª Reg.	13th	
1993–94	6	1ª Reg.	13th	
1994–95	6	1ª Reg.	1st	
1995–96	5	Reg. Pref.	10th	
1996–97	5	Reg. Pref.	12th	
1997–98	5	Reg. Pref.	3rd	
1998–99	4	3ª	15th	
1999–2000	4	3ª	4th	
2000–01	4	3ª	(R)	
2001–02	5	Reg. Pref.	16th	
2002–03	6	1ª Reg.	6th	
2003–04	6	1ª Reg.	11th	
2004–05	6	1ª Reg.	10th	
2005–06	DNP			
2006–07	7	2ª Reg.	5th	
2007–08	7	2ª Reg.	8th	

Season	Tier	Division	Place	Copa del Rey
2008–09	7	2ª Reg.	9th	
2009–10	7	2ª Reg.	8th	
2010–11	7	2ª Reg.	10th	
2011–12	7	2ª Reg.	4th	
2012–13	6	1ª Reg.	17th	
2013–14	7	2ª Reg.	13th	
2014–15	7	2ª Reg.	9th	
2015–16	7	2ª Reg.	5th	
2016–17	7	2ª Reg.	6th	
2017–18	7	2ª Reg.	2nd	
2018–19	6	1ª Reg.	2nd	
2019–20	5	Reg. Pref.	4th	
2020–21	5	Reg. Pref.	5th	Preliminary
2021–22	6	Reg. Pref.	15th	
2022–23	7	1ª Reg.	2nd	
2023–24	6	Reg. Pref.	14th	
2024–25	6	Reg. Pref.	13th	
2025–26	7	1ª Reg.	6th	
2026–27	7	1ª Reg.		

- 3 seasons in Tercera División
