= CD Coslada =

Spanish football team

Coslada
- Full name: Club Deportivo Coslada
- Founded: 1972
- Ground: El Olivo, Coslada, Madrid, Spain
- Capacity: 2,500
- President: (Spain) Juan José González Vicien
- Head coach: (Spain) Paco Moreno
- League: Primera Autonómica de Aficionados – Group 1
- 2024–25: Preferente de Madrid – Group 1, 12th of 18
Home colours	Away colours

Club Deportivo Coslada is a Spanish football team based in Coslada, in the autonomous Community of Madrid. Founded in 1972, it plays in Primera Autonómica de Aficionados – Group 1, holding home games at Estadio Municipal El Olivo, with a capacity of 2,500 seats.

== Season to season ==
Season	Tier	Division	Place	Copa del Rey
1973–74	8	3ª Reg.	2nd	
1974–75	8	3ª Reg.	2nd	
1975–76	7	3ª Reg. P.	19th	
1976–77	8	3ª Reg.	10th	
1977–78	9	3ª Reg.	8th	
1978–79	9	3ª Reg.	2nd	
1979–80	8	3ª Reg. P.	7th	
1980–81	8	3ª Reg. P.	6th	
1981–82	8	3ª Reg. P.	3rd	
1982–83	7	2ª Reg.	3rd	
1983–84	6	1ª Reg.	1st	
1984–85	5	Reg. Pref.	11th	
1985–86	5	Reg. Pref.	10th	
1986–87	5	Reg. Pref.	6th	
1987–88	4	3ª	18th	
1988–89	5	Reg. Pref.	4th	
1989–90	5	Reg. Pref.	5th	
1990–91	5	Reg. Pref.	11th	
1991–92	5	Reg. Pref.	7th	
1992–93	5	Reg. Pref.	2nd	
1993–94	5	Reg. Pref.	3rd	

Season	Tier	Division	Place	Copa del Rey
1994–95	4	3ª	18th	
1995–96	4	3ª	16th	
1996–97	4	3ª	15th	
1997–98	4	3ª	9th	
1998–99	4	3ª	3rd	
1999–2000	4	3ª	1st	
2000–01	4	3ª	8th	Preliminary
2001–02	4	3ª	19th	
2002–03	5	Reg. Pref.	3rd	
2003–04	4	3ª	18th	
2004–05	5	Reg. Pref.	2nd	
2005–06	4	3ª	10th	
2006–07	4	3ª	18th	
2007–08	5	Reg. Pref.	12th	
2008–09	5	Reg. Pref.	4th	
2009–10	5	Pref.	3rd	
2010–11	4	3ª	20th	
2011–12	5	Pref.	10th	
2012–13	5	Pref.	11th	
2013–14	5	Pref.	12th	
2014–15	5	Pref.	7th	

Season	Tier	Division	Place	Copa del Rey
2015–16	5	Pref.	6th	
2016–17	5	Pref.	5th	
2017–18	5	Pref.	9th	
2018–19	5	Pref.	10th	
2019–20	5	Pref.	8th	
2020–21	5	Pref.	8th	
2021–22	6	Pref.	14th	
2022–23	7	1ª Afic.	3rd	
2023–24	6	Pref.	9th	
2024–25	6	1ª Aut.	12th	
2025–26	6	1ª Aut.		

- 13 seasons in Tercera División
