= Cebolla =

- Municipality
- Flag Coat of arms

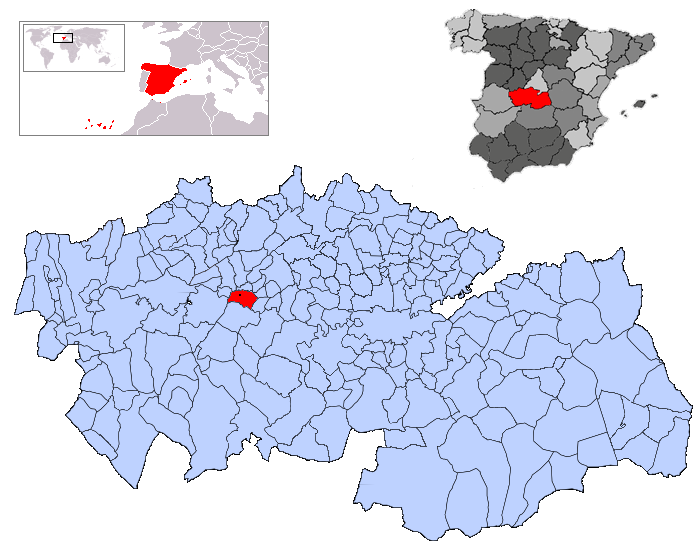

- Location in Spain
- Coordinates: 39°57′2″N 4°34′7″W
- Country: Spain
- Autonomous community: Castile-La Mancha
- Province: Toledo
- Comarca: Torrijos
- Judicial district: Talavera de la Reina
- Founded: Ver texto

Government
  - Alcalde: Jesús Malta García(2007)

Area
  - Total: 37 km^{2} (14 sq mi)
- Elevation: 440 m (1,440 ft)

Population (2025-01-01)
  - Total: 3,270
  - Density: 88/km^{2} (230/sq mi)
- Demonym(s): Cebollano, na
- Time zone: UTC+1 (CET)
  - Summer (DST): UTC+2 (CEST)
- Postal code: 45680
- Dialing code: 925

Cebolla is a Spanish municipality of Toledo province, in the autonomous community of Castile-La Mancha. Its population is 2,978 and it is 37 km^{2}, in area with a density of 80.5 people/km^{2}.

The mayor of Cebolla is Jesús Malta García, of the Partido Socialista Obrero Español. The Partido Socialista Obrero Español has 7 municipal councillors and the Partido Popular has 4. In the 2004 Spanish General Election the Partido Socialista Obrero Español got 52.8% of the vote in Cebolla, the Partido Popular got 43.5% and Izquierda Unida got 2.1%.

== Demographics ==
Historical population
Year	Pop.	±%
1900	2,343	—
1910	2,597	+10.8%
1920	2,669	+2.8%
1930	2,832	+6.1%
1940	2,739	−3.3%
1950	3,165	+15.6%
1960	2,977	−5.9%
1970	2,505	−15.9%
1981	2,517	+0.5%
1991	2,578	+2.4%
2001	2,874	+11.5%
2011	3,823	+33.0%
2021	3,204	−16.2%
2023	3,191	−0.4%
Source: INE
