= 1997–98 Tercera División =

Tercera División
- Season: 1997–98

The 1997–98 Tercera División season is the 21st season since establishment the tier four.

== League table ==
=== Group 1 ===
Pos	Team	Pld	W	D	L	GF	GA	GD	Pts	Qualification or relegation
1	SD Compostela B	40	25	13	2	90	29	+61	88	Promotion play-offs
2	CD Lalín	40	22	10	8	66	42	+24	76	Promotion play-offs
3	Celta de Vigo B	40	23	6	11	68	35	+33	75	Promotion play-offs
4	Betanzos CF	40	22	8	10	68	41	+27	74	Promotion play-offs
5	Ponte Ourense CF	40	22	8	10	82	53	+29	74	
6	Arosa SC	40	19	8	13	54	46	+8	65	
7	Caselas FC	40	18	9	13	71	50	+21	63	
8	Club Lemos	40	16	14	10	53	45	+8	62	
9	UD Xove Lago	40	17	9	14	49	43	+6	60	
10	Viveiro CF	40	16	10	14	55	49	+6	58	
11	Gran Peña FC	40	15	11	14	65	63	+2	56	
12	CCD Cerceda	40	14	13	13	57	46	+11	55	
13	Villalonga FC	40	15	10	15	67	57	+10	55	
14	Porriño Industrial FC	40	14	8	18	58	54	+4	50	
15	Gondomar CF	40	12	13	15	49	57	−8	49	
16	Xuventude Sanxenxo	40	13	9	18	49	70	−21	48	
17	UD Somozas	40	13	6	21	46	63	−17	45	
18	CD Estradense (R)	40	7	12	21	38	71	−33	33	Relegation
19	Imperator OAR (R)	40	7	9	24	39	83	−44	30	Relegation
20	Laracha CF (R)	40	5	9	26	43	98	−55	24	Relegation
21	Juventud Cambados (R)	40	3	9	28	25	97	−72	18	Relegation

Source: Fútbol Regional
(R) Relegated

=== Group 2 ===
Pos	Team	Pld	W	D	L	GF	GA	GD	Pts	Qualification or relegation
1	CD Lealtad de Villaviciosa	38	25	10	3	77	34	+43	85	Promotion play-offs
2	CD Universidad de Oviedo	38	20	10	8	64	41	+23	70	Promotion play-offs
3	Navia CF	38	17	14	7	58	35	+23	65	Promotion play-offs
4	Club Siero	38	18	11	9	57	33	+24	65	Promotion play-offs
5	Pumarín CF	38	17	10	11	40	30	+10	61	
6	CD San Martín	38	17	10	11	48	35	+13	61	
7	SD Narcea	38	15	12	11	45	42	+3	57	
8	Club Marino de Luanco	38	14	11	13	44	39	+5	53	
9	CD Tuilla	38	12	14	12	47	42	+5	50	
10	Andés CF	38	12	13	13	45	48	−3	49	
11	Candás CF	38	12	12	14	39	45	−6	48	
12	Ribadesella CF	38	11	14	13	43	55	−12	47	
13	Deportiva Piloñesa	38	12	9	17	39	52	−13	45	
14	UD Gijón Industrial	38	12	9	17	51	53	−2	45	
15	Real Titánico	38	10	14	14	33	37	−4	44	
16	SD Navarro CF	38	11	10	17	39	51	−12	43	
17	SD Colloto	38	9	14	15	39	58	−19	41	
18	CD Praviano (R)	38	9	13	16	25	40	−15	40	Relegation
19	Club Hispano de Castrillón (R)	38	7	11	20	33	60	−27	32	Relegation
20	CD Turón (R)	38	4	11	23	24	60	−36	23	Relegation

Source: Fútbol Regional
(R) Relegated

=== Group 3 ===
Pos	Team	Pld	W	D	L	GF	GA	GD	Pts	Qualification or relegation
1	CD Tropezón	38	22	14	2	63	25	+38	80	Promotion play-offs
2	SD Noja	38	18	13	7	51	22	+29	67	Promotion play-offs
3	UM Escobedo	38	18	12	8	50	32	+18	66	Promotion play-offs
4	Castro FC	38	17	13	8	55	37	+18	64	Promotion play-offs
5	CD Cayón	38	18	8	12	51	46	+5	62	
6	Santoña CF	38	15	12	11	47	35	+12	57	
7	CD Guarnizo	38	16	9	13	31	31	0	57	
8	Ribamontán al Mar CF	38	14	14	10	39	28	+11	56	
9	SD Barreda Balompié	38	14	12	12	45	45	0	54	
10	CD Bezana	38	12	16	10	45	33	+12	52	
11	SD Unión Club Astillero	38	13	13	12	39	37	+2	52	
12	Velarde CF	38	12	13	13	36	47	−11	49	
13	CD Laredo	38	12	11	15	38	40	−2	47	
14	CD Comillas	38	12	8	18	33	49	−16	44	
15	CD Naval	38	11	9	18	36	46	−10	42	
16	SD Revilla	38	11	7	20	37	50	−13	40	
17	SD Villaescusa	38	11	7	20	27	57	−30	40	
18	CA Deva (R)	38	8	14	16	23	38	−15	38	Relegation
19	CF Vimenor (R)	38	8	11	19	29	43	−14	35	Relegation
20	SD Reocín (R)	38	6	8	24	29	63	−34	26	Relegation

Source: Fútbol Regional
(R) Relegated

=== Group 4 ===
Pos	Team	Pld	W	D	L	GF	GA	GD	Pts	Qualification or relegation
1	CD Basconia	38	20	11	7	61	31	+30	71	Promotion play-offs
2	Zalla UC	38	18	15	5	50	25	+25	69	Promotion play-offs
3	Real Sociedad B	38	18	15	5	73	37	+36	69	Promotion play-offs
4	SD Amorebieta	38	17	13	8	38	29	+9	64	Promotion play-offs
5	SD San Pedro	38	17	7	14	56	50	+6	58	
6	SCD Durango	38	16	8	14	57	50	+7	56	
7	Deportivo Alavés B	38	15	10	13	43	40	+3	55	
8	CD Santurtzi	38	15	9	14	48	48	0	54	
9	CD Hernani	38	12	13	13	44	46	−2	49	
10	CD Lagun Onak	38	13	10	15	43	40	+3	49	
11	CD Touring	38	14	5	19	66	66	0	47	
12	CD Aurrerá Ondarroa	38	11	13	14	47	56	−9	46	
13	Arenas Club de Getxo	38	9	19	10	43	50	−7	46	
14	Universidad del País Vasco-EHU	38	12	10	16	41	47	−6	46	
15	SD Zamudio	38	13	6	19	42	53	−11	45	
16	Tolosa CF	38	12	8	18	40	44	−4	44	
17	CD Arratia (R)	38	10	13	15	30	51	−21	43	Relegation
18	Zorroza FC (R)	38	11	10	17	37	57	−20	43	Relegation
19	Club San Ignacio (R)	38	8	17	13	45	57	−12	41	Relegation
20	CD Getxo (R)	38	9	8	21	42	69	−27	35	Relegation

Source: Fútbol Regional
(R) Relegated

=== Group 5 ===
Pos	Team	Pld	W	D	L	GF	GA	GD	Pts	Qualification or relegation
1	FC Barcelona C	38	24	6	8	91	44	+47	78	Promotion play-offs
2	Palamós CF	38	22	4	12	56	37	+19	70	Promotion play-offs
3	CE Mataró	38	21	6	11	85	47	+38	69	Promotion play-offs
4	CD Tortosa	38	19	11	8	62	35	+27	68	Promotion play-offs
5	AEC Manlleu	38	20	8	10	58	36	+22	68	
6	UE Badaloní	38	17	11	10	51	40	+11	62	
7	UA Horta	38	19	5	14	63	55	+8	62	
8	CE Europa	38	18	7	13	60	48	+12	61	
9	Vilobí CF	38	16	8	14	64	65	−1	56	
10	CD Banyoles	38	14	8	16	55	57	−2	50	
11	UE Vilassar de Mar	38	12	13	13	56	62	−6	49	
12	CF Badalona	38	14	7	17	56	59	−3	49	
13	CE Premià	38	13	8	17	50	50	0	47	
14	UE Tàrrega	38	12	10	16	55	67	−12	46	
15	UE Sant Andreu	38	12	8	18	52	62	−10	44	
16	FC Vilafranca	38	12	8	18	36	60	−24	44	
17	FC Santboià	38	11	9	18	47	69	−22	42	
18	UE Rubí (R)	38	12	5	21	49	84	−35	41	Relegation
19	CF Igualada (R)	38	6	10	22	34	65	−31	28	Relegation
20	CE Júpiter (R)	38	5	10	23	33	71	−38	25	Relegation

Source: Fútbol Regional
(R) Relegated

=== Group 6 ===
Pos	Team	Pld	W	D	L	GF	GA	GD	Pts	Qualification or relegation
1	CD Eldense	38	25	8	5	70	25	+45	83	Promotion play-offs
2	Benidorm CD	38	21	5	12	52	29	+23	68	Promotion play-offs
3	Pinoso CF	38	17	17	4	52	24	+28	68	Promotion play-offs
4	CD Olímpic de Xàtiva	38	19	10	9	49	38	+11	67	Promotion play-offs
5	Burjassot CF	38	19	9	10	56	40	+16	66	
6	CD Burriana	38	19	8	11	58	39	+19	65	
7	CD Alcoyano	38	18	10	10	59	31	+28	64	
8	Elche CF B	38	18	4	16	54	52	+2	58	
9	Gimnástico CF	38	15	10	13	48	49	−1	55	
10	Pego CF	38	13	16	9	38	27	+11	55	
11	CD Onda	38	14	9	15	44	46	−2	51	
12	UD Vall de Uxó	38	13	10	15	47	56	−9	49	
13	SD Sueca	38	13	8	17	33	44	−11	47	
14	CD Utiel	38	13	6	19	32	47	−15	45	
15	Santa Pola CF	38	12	5	21	38	55	−17	41	
16	FC Torrevieja	38	9	14	15	44	52	−8	41	
17	CD San Marcelino	38	10	10	18	47	68	−21	40	
18	AD Español de San Vicente	38	10	9	19	60	65	−5	39	Relegation
19	CD Acero	38	11	5	22	46	71	−25	38	Relegation
20	Llíria CF	38	2	5	31	23	92	−69	11	Relegation

Source: Fútbol Regional

=== Group 7 ===
Pos	Team	Pld	W	D	L	GF	GA	GD	Pts	Qualification or relegation
1	Aranjuez CF	40	28	8	4	78	33	+45	92	Promotion play-offs
2	CD Móstoles	40	24	8	8	93	42	+51	80	Promotion play-offs
3	Real Madrid C	40	21	11	8	85	48	+37	74	Promotion play-offs
4	UD San Sebastián de los Reyes	40	21	9	10	69	38	+31	72	Promotion play-offs
5	RSD Alcalá	40	17	12	11	71	57	+14	63	
6	AD Colmenar Viejo	40	17	11	12	60	46	+14	62	
7	CD San Fernando de Henares	40	16	14	10	58	42	+16	62	
8	AD Parla	40	16	12	12	59	52	+7	60	
9	CD Coslada	40	17	8	15	67	50	+17	59	
10	DAV Santa Ana	40	16	11	13	57	60	−3	59	
11	CD Pegaso	40	15	11	14	51	68	−17	56	
12	CD Colonia Moscardó	40	14	13	13	60	51	+9	55	
13	Rayo Vallecano B	40	15	10	15	57	54	+3	55	
14	CP Amorós	40	13	11	16	54	52	+2	50	
15	CD Las Rozas	40	13	11	16	52	62	−10	50	
16	CDA Navalcarnero	40	11	12	17	42	61	−19	45	
17	CD Puerta Bonita	40	9	17	14	49	61	−12	44	
18	CD Fuencarral (R)	40	7	12	21	37	80	−43	33	Relegation
19	AD Torrejón (R)	40	8	7	25	36	75	−39	31	Relegation
20	AD Alcorcón (R)	40	4	13	23	35	74	−39	25	Relegation
21	Atlético Valdemoro (R)	40	4	7	29	24	88	−64	19	Relegation

Source: Fútbol Regional
(R) Relegated

=== Group 8 ===
Pos	Team	Pld	W	D	L	GF	GA	GD	Pts	Qualification or relegation
1	CF Palencia	38	22	10	6	69	33	+36	76	Promotion play-offs
2	SD Gimnástica Segoviana	38	21	12	5	55	24	+31	75	Promotion play-offs
3	SD Ponferradina	38	20	12	6	69	30	+39	72	Promotion play-offs
4	UD Salamanca B	38	19	13	6	64	36	+28	70	Promotion play-offs
5	CD Nava	38	19	10	9	62	48	+14	67	
6	Real Ávila CF	38	15	8	15	46	40	+6	53	
7	CF Endesa Ponferrada	38	13	12	13	37	43	−6	51	
8	Cultural y Deportiva Leonesa B	38	13	12	13	37	35	+2	51	
9	CD Laguna	38	12	13	13	34	29	+5	49	
10	Cuéllar CF	38	13	10	15	45	51	−6	49	
11	CA Bembibre	38	13	9	16	61	65	−4	48	
12	RCD Ribert	38	11	14	13	48	62	−14	47	
13	Racing Lermeño	38	12	10	16	37	40	−3	46	
14	SD Hullera Vasco-Leonesa	38	10	16	12	39	47	−8	46	
15	La Bañeza FC	38	11	12	15	49	49	0	45	
16	CD Béjar Industrial	38	11	11	16	45	58	−13	44	
17	Garray CF	38	10	12	16	29	45	−16	42	
18	Arandina CF (R)	38	11	7	20	42	66	−24	40	Relegation
19	Atlético Astorga FC (R)	38	8	13	17	37	59	−22	37	Relegation
20	CD Tardajos (R)	38	5	6	27	29	74	−45	21	Relegation

Source: Fútbol Regional
(R) Relegated

=== Group 9 ===
Pos	Team	Pld	W	D	L	GF	GA	GD	Pts	Qualification or relegation
1	CD Linares	40	27	7	6	78	34	+44	88	Promotion play-offs
2	Polideportivo Ejido	40	26	8	6	110	30	+80	86	Promotion play-offs
3	CP Granada 74	40	20	13	7	65	29	+36	73	Promotion play-offs
4	Vélez CF	40	20	8	12	80	57	+23	68	Promotion play-offs
5	Baeza CF	40	19	9	12	54	44	+10	66	
6	Málaga CF B	40	17	13	10	54	40	+14	64	
7	Martos CD	40	20	4	16	46	45	+1	64	
8	CD Mármol Macael	40	17	10	13	54	42	+12	61	
9	Juventud de Torremolinos CF	40	16	13	11	48	41	+7	61	
10	Vandalia de Peligros CF	40	16	12	12	52	49	+3	60	
11	CD Ronda	40	17	8	15	64	60	+4	59	
12	UD Maracena	40	14	14	12	57	41	+16	56	
13	Úbeda CF	40	15	6	19	44	50	−6	51	
14	Arenas de Armilla CF	40	13	10	17	52	57	−5	49	
15	CD Roquetas	40	13	7	20	49	61	−12	46	
16	Antequera CF	40	12	10	18	35	50	−15	46	
17	UD San Isidro de Níjar	40	12	10	18	47	65	−18	46	
18	Granada CF B (R)	40	11	9	20	42	59	−17	42	Relegation
19	UD Manilva-Sabinillas (R)	40	7	14	19	40	69	−29	35	Relegation
20	UD Fuengirola (R)	40	6	8	26	39	88	−49	26	Relegation
21	CD Gimnástico Melilla (R)	40	4	3	33	22	121	−99	15	Relegation

Source: Fútbol Regional
(R) Relegated

=== Group 10 ===
Pos	Team	Pld	W	D	L	GF	GA	GD	Pts	Qualification or relegation
1	AD Ceuta	38	24	10	4	81	27	+54	82	Promotion play-offs
2	CD San Fernando	38	23	9	6	91	31	+60	78	Promotion play-offs
3	CD San Roque de Lepe	38	18	10	10	50	30	+20	64	Promotion play-offs
4	Algeciras CF	38	19	7	12	54	46	+8	64	Promotion play-offs
5	Atlético Lucentino Industrial	38	16	15	7	34	21	+13	63	
6	Coria CF	38	18	9	11	57	36	+21	63	
7	Chiclana CF	38	17	7	14	52	42	+10	58	
8	CD Utrera	38	14	11	13	48	48	0	53	
9	La Palma CF	38	15	7	16	45	60	−15	52	
10	CD Rota	38	14	8	16	53	65	−12	50	
11	RB Linense	38	12	10	16	39	60	−21	46	
12	Ayamonte CF	38	11	13	14	46	48	−2	46	
13	Puerto Real CF	38	13	6	19	49	61	−12	45	
14	Viña Verde Montilla CF	38	10	15	13	37	48	−11	45	
15	Atlético Sanluqueño CF	38	11	11	16	49	49	0	44	
16	CD Pozoblanco	38	10	14	14	43	48	−5	44	
17	UD Los Palacios	38	10	12	16	40	53	−13	42	
18	Cádiz CF B (R)	38	9	13	16	35	47	−12	40	Relegation
19	La Rambla CF (R)	38	8	10	20	38	74	−36	34	Relegation
20	CD Rayo Sanluqueño (R)	38	5	9	24	36	83	−47	24	Relegation

Source: Fútbol Regional
(R) Relegated

=== Group 11 ===
Pos	Team	Pld	W	D	L	GF	GA	GD	Pts	Qualification or relegation
1	CD Atlético Baleares	38	27	7	4	96	21	+75	88	Promotion play-offs
2	CD Constancia	38	25	8	5	87	22	+65	83	Promotion play-offs
3	CF Sporting Mahonés	38	22	7	9	53	35	+18	73	Promotion play-offs
4	CF Villafranca	38	19	13	6	67	38	+29	70	Promotion play-offs
5	CD Binissalem	38	18	10	10	69	38	+31	64	
6	CD Campos	38	17	12	9	48	35	+13	63	
7	UD Poblense	38	17	7	14	65	48	+17	58	
8	SCR Peña Deportiva	38	16	10	12	49	40	+9	58	
9	CD Manacor	38	15	11	12	42	38	+4	56	
10	CD Alayor	38	13	16	9	62	52	+10	55	
11	CF Pollença	38	15	8	15	48	46	+2	53	
12	CD Ferriolense	38	13	10	15	48	56	−8	49	
13	CD Playas de Calvià	38	14	6	18	50	47	+3	48	
14	Atlètic de Ciutadella	38	11	8	19	50	72	−22	41	
15	CE Andratx	38	12	5	21	38	67	−29	41	
16	UD Arenal	38	11	5	22	40	57	−17	38	
17	CD Ferreries	38	9	10	19	35	62	−27	37	
18	CD Cardassar (R)	38	9	9	20	24	60	−36	36	Relegation
19	Recreativo La Victoria (R)	38	4	9	25	36	96	−60	21	Relegation
20	SD Portmany (R)	38	4	7	27	18	95	−77	19	Relegation

Source: Fútbol Regional
(R) Relegated

=== Group 12 ===
Pos	Team	Pld	W	D	L	GF	GA	GD	Pts	Qualification or relegation
1	Universidad de Las Palmas CF	38	23	11	4	84	35	+49	80	Promotion play-offs
2	CD Corralejo	38	24	7	7	76	21	+55	79	Promotion play-offs
3	UD Las Palmas B	38	23	8	7	71	28	+43	77	Promotion play-offs
4	UD Lanzarote	38	22	10	6	59	25	+34	76	Promotion play-offs
5	UD Telde	38	21	7	10	56	33	+23	70	
6	CD Victoria	38	16	10	12	51	42	+9	58	
7	UD Orotava	38	15	8	15	56	54	+2	53	
8	CD San Isidro	38	14	10	14	50	44	+6	52	
9	UD Vecindario	38	13	11	14	39	44	−5	50	
10	UD Realejos	38	13	11	14	48	52	−4	50	
11	UD Ibarra	38	13	7	18	53	76	−23	46	
12	CD Doramas	38	11	13	14	42	45	−3	46	
13	CD Tenerife B	38	10	16	12	44	45	−1	46	
14	SD Tenisca	38	10	14	14	41	49	−8	44	
15	CD Maspalomas	38	12	6	20	52	68	−16	42	
16	Atlético Arona	38	11	8	19	40	73	−33	41	
17	CF Unión Carrizal	38	9	13	16	46	69	−23	40	
18	CD Puerto Cruz (R)	38	8	11	19	36	55	−19	35	Relegation
19	Estrella CF (R)	38	8	10	20	31	62	−31	34	Relegation
20	CD Atlético Paso (R)	38	5	7	26	22	77	−55	22	Relegation

Source: Fútbol Regional
(R) Relegated

=== Group 13 ===
Pos	Team	Pld	W	D	L	GF	GA	GD	Pts	Qualification or relegation
1	Cartagonova FC	37	29	5	3	110	30	+80	92	Promotion play-offs
2	Águilas CF	37	23	8	6	75	24	+51	77	Promotion play-offs
3	Sangonera Atlético CF	37	19	13	5	61	32	+29	70	Promotion play-offs
4	Caravaca CF	37	21	6	10	52	42	+10	69	Promotion play-offs
5	AD Relesa Las Palas	37	20	8	9	62	38	+24	68	
6	CD Bullense	37	15	16	6	56	38	+18	61	
7	Orihuela CF	37	18	6	13	56	41	+15	60	
8	Club Olímpico de Totana	37	16	9	12	46	44	+2	57	
9	Real Murcia CF B	37	15	9	13	54	41	+13	51	
10	UD Horadada	37	15	6	16	55	49	+6	51	
11	CD Cieza	37	12	9	16	40	59	−19	45	
12	Blanca CF	37	11	7	19	43	69	−26	40	
13	Jumilla CF	37	10	9	18	40	54	−14	39	
14	CD Abarán	37	9	10	18	43	69	−26	37	
15	CD Alquerías	37	8	13	16	30	41	−11	37	
16	CD Beniel	37	10	4	23	34	58	−24	34	
17	CF Santomera	37	7	10	20	31	75	−44	31	
18	Pinatar CF-EMF (R)	37	6	8	23	30	68	−38	26	Relegation
19	AD Cotillas CF (R)	37	6	7	24	26	71	−45	25	Relegation
20	Cartagena Atlético (Note: Cartagena Atlético only played 19 matches before being disbanded.)	19	8	3	8	23	24	−1	3	Relegation

Source: Fútbol Regional
(R) Relegated

=== Group 14 ===
Pos	Team	Pld	W	D	L	GF	GA	GD	Pts	Qualification or relegation
1	Jerez CF	38	26	9	3	90	25	+65	87	Promotion play-offs
2	UD Mérida Promesas	38	24	9	5	63	15	+48	81	Promotion play-offs
3	SP Villafranca	38	23	8	7	78	30	+48	77	Promotion play-offs
4	CD Badajoz B	38	22	9	7	62	29	+33	75	Promotion play-offs
5	SC Villanueva	38	19	9	10	61	33	+28	66	
6	CD Grabasa Burguillos	38	17	13	8	60	37	+23	64	
7	CF Extremadura B	38	17	11	10	60	36	+24	62	
8	CD Zafra Industrial	38	17	8	13	60	51	+9	59	
9	CD Coria	38	17	8	13	53	56	−3	59	
10	CD Don Benito	38	14	12	12	66	46	+20	54	
11	CD Valdelacalzada	38	15	7	16	57	56	+1	52	
12	Olivenza CP	38	15	6	17	43	58	−15	51	
13	UC La Estrella	38	12	7	19	32	54	−22	43	
14	CD Castuera	38	12	6	20	40	56	−16	42	
15	CP Cacereño B	38	11	9	18	52	75	−23	42	
16	CD Santa Amalia	38	9	12	17	36	48	−12	39	
17	CD Guadiana	38	7	13	18	35	64	−29	34	
18	Arroyo CP (R)	38	7	10	21	47	74	−27	31	Relegation
19	CP Moraleja (R)	38	7	5	26	39	86	−47	26	Relegation
20	UD Montijo (R)	38	3	1	34	22	127	−105	10	Relegation

Source: Fútbol Regional
(R) Relegated

=== Group 15 ===
Pos	Team	Pld	W	D	L	GF	GA	GD	Pts	Qualification or relegation
1	CD Calahorra	40	31	2	7	88	22	+66	95	Promotion play-offs
2	Peña Sport FC	40	22	14	4	68	28	+40	80	Promotion play-offs
3	CD Logroñés B	40	24	6	10	69	32	+37	78	Promotion play-offs
4	CD Azkoyen	40	21	12	7	64	34	+30	75	Promotion play-offs
5	CD Oberena	40	16	13	11	49	34	+15	61	
6	CD Tudelano	40	16	13	11	46	33	+13	61	
7	Atlético Artajonés	40	16	8	16	45	49	−4	56	
8	UCD Burladés	40	14	10	16	42	46	−4	52	
9	CD Mirandés	40	13	11	16	48	45	+3	50	
10	UDC Chantrea	40	12	14	14	45	45	0	50	
11	CD Aoiz	40	13	10	17	43	62	−19	49	
12	CD Beti Onak	40	14	6	20	45	50	−5	48	
13	CD Egüés	40	12	12	16	44	58	−14	48	
14	Murchante FC	40	14	5	21	43	64	−21	47	
15	AD San Juan	40	11	14	15	38	63	−25	47	
16	CD Alfaro	40	12	11	17	40	50	−10	47	
17	Haro Deportivo	40	12	11	17	32	40	−8	47	
18	CD Ribaforada (R)	40	11	13	16	41	64	−23	46	Relegation
19	CD Erriberri (R)	40	12	6	22	30	48	−18	42	Relegation
20	CD Cortes (R)	40	8	15	17	40	64	−24	39	Relegation
21	AD Noáin (R)	40	8	10	22	32	61	−29	34	Relegation

Source: Fútbol Regional
(R) Relegated

=== Group 16 ===
Pos	Team	Pld	W	D	L	GF	GA	GD	Pts	Qualification or relegation
1	CD Binéfar	38	27	6	5	89	27	+62	87	Promotion play-offs
2	UD Fraga	38	22	7	9	85	37	+48	73	Promotion play-offs
3	CF Figueruelas	38	22	6	10	54	34	+20	72	Promotion play-offs
4	UD Casetas	38	21	8	9	69	44	+25	71	Promotion play-offs
5	CD Teruel	38	18	13	7	57	36	+21	67	
6	UD Barbastro	38	18	12	8	59	32	+27	66	
7	CF Illueca	38	17	11	10	59	42	+17	62	
8	CD Sariñena	38	15	12	11	40	31	+9	57	
9	CF Lalueza	38	15	11	12	51	53	−2	56	
10	CD La Almunia	38	14	10	14	55	48	+7	52	
11	Villanueva CF	38	14	8	16	51	61	−10	50	
12	Alcañiz CF	38	14	8	16	57	73	−16	50	
13	Utebo FC	38	14	7	17	52	49	+3	49	
14	Atlético Monzón	38	13	6	19	47	52	−5	45	
15	Atlético Monzalbarba	38	11	10	17	46	58	−12	43	
16	CD Endesa Escatrón	38	10	11	17	36	52	−16	41	
17	SD Huesca	38	11	4	23	49	65	−16	37	
18	CD Oliver (R)	38	8	12	18	37	62	−25	36	Relegation
19	CDJ Peralta (R)	38	5	6	27	32	96	−64	21	Relegation
20	SD Ejea (R)	38	5	4	29	36	109	−73	19	Relegation

Source: Fútbol Regional
(R) Relegated

=== Group 17 ===
Pos	Team	Pld	W	D	L	GF	GA	GD	Pts	Qualification or relegation
1	Hellín Deportivo	38	22	12	4	65	24	+41	78	Promotion play-offs
2	UB Conquense	38	22	9	7	60	32	+28	75	Promotion play-offs
3	Puertollano Industrial CF	38	20	14	4	49	23	+26	74	Promotion play-offs
4	Guadalajara	38	23	5	10	71	42	+29	74	Promotion play-offs
5	Tomelloso CF	38	21	11	6	76	33	+43	74	
6	CP Villarrobledo	38	19	11	8	70	37	+33	68	
7	CD Torrijos	38	16	12	10	46	34	+12	60	
8	AD Torpedo 66	38	16	6	16	47	48	−1	54	
9	UD Almansa	38	14	7	17	51	54	−3	49	
10	CF Belmonte	38	13	10	15	53	64	−11	49	
11	CD Cuenca	38	12	12	14	38	48	−10	48	
12	CD Bolañego	38	12	10	16	29	45	−16	46	
13	Atlético Teresiano	38	12	9	17	44	51	−7	45	
14	CF Gimnástico Alcázar	38	12	8	18	36	43	−7	44	
15	CF Valdepeñas	38	10	14	14	41	39	+2	44	
16	CF La Solana	38	10	12	16	41	44	−3	42	
17	UD Socuéllamos CF	38	9	14	15	38	61	−23	41	
18	Almagro CF (R)	38	12	3	23	51	68	−17	39	Relegation
19	Atlético Consuegra (R)	38	6	9	23	33	90	−57	27	Relegation
20	CD Azuqueca (R)	38	1	8	29	20	79	−59	11	Relegation

Source: Fútbol Regional
(R) Relegated

== Promotion play-off ==
Source:
