= 1996 Tercera División play-offs =

Spanish football league play-offs

The 1996 Tercera División play-offs to Segunda División B from Tercera División (Promotion play-offs) were the final playoffs for the promotion from 1995–96 Tercera División to 1996–97 Segunda División B. The first four teams in each group (excluding reserve teams) took part in the play-off.

== Format ==
The 68 participating teams were divided into 5 series each made up of 4 groups in the category, with the exception of Series E , which was only formed by Group XII . Each series was divided into 4 groups formed by a 1st, a 2nd, a 3rd and a 4th classified from each group, which played a double-round playoff. Each victory was equivalent to 3 points, the tie to 1 point and the defeat to 0 points. The champion of each group obtained the promotion to Second Division B.

The distribution of each series was as follows:

Series A:

- Group I – Galicia (Galicia (Spain))
- Group II – Asturias
- Group VII – Community of Madrid
- Group VIII – Castile and León

Series B:

- Group III – Cantabria
- Group IV – Basque Country (Basque Country (autonomous community))
- Group XV – La Rioja and Navarre
- Group XVI – Aragon

Series C:

- Group V – Catalonia
- Group VI – Valencian Community
- Group XI – Balearic Islands
- Gruoup XIII – Region of Murcia

Series D:

- Group IX – Eastern Andalusia and Melilla
- Group X – Western Andalusia and Ceuta
- Group XIV – Extremadura
- Group XVII – Castilla–La Mancha

Series E:

- Group XII – Canary Islands

== Teams for 1995–96 play-offs ==
| Group I – Galicia (Galicia (Spain)) | Group II – Asturias | Group III – Cantabria | Group IV – Basque Country (Basque Country (autonomous community)) | Group V – Catalonia |
|---|---|---|---|---|
| 1st CCD Cerceda | 1st Real Titánico | 1st RS Gimnástica de Torrelavega | 1st Zalla UC | 1st UE Tàrrega |
| 2nd Puente Orense CF | 2nd Real Oviedo B | 2nd Racing de Santander B | 2nd SD Zamudio | 2nd CE Europa |
| 3rd RC Celta de Vigo B | 3rd Club Marino de Luanco | 3rd CD Tropezón | 3rd SD Gernika Club | 3rd FC Santboià |
| 4th CD Lalín | 4th Caudal Deportivo | 4th SD Noja | 4th CD Elgoibar | 4th Palamós CF |

| Group VI – Valencian Community | Group VII – Community of Madrid | Group VIII – Castile and León | Group IX – E. Andalusia and Melilla | Group X – W. Andalusia and Ceuta |
|---|---|---|---|---|
| 1st CF Llíria | 1st CF Rayo Majadahonda | 1st CD Laguna | 1st CP Ejido | 1st CD San Fernando |
| 2nd CD Acero | 2nd AD Orcasitas | 2nd Zamora CF | 2nd UD Maracena | 2nd Atlético Sanluqueño CF |
| 3rd CF Gandía | 3rd CD Carabanchel | 3rd CA Bembibre | 3rd Guadix CF | 3rd Isla Cristina CD |
| 4th Pinoso CF | 4th AD Colmenar Viejo | 4th CA Burgalés | 4th Motril CF | 4th Chiclana CF |

| Group XI – Balearic Islands | Group XII – Canary Islands | Group XIII – Region of Murcia | Group XIV – Extremadura | Group XV – Navarre and La Rioja |
|---|---|---|---|---|
| 1st CF Sóller | 1st CD Corralejo | 1st Real Murcia | 1st CP Cacereño | 1st CD Calahorra |
| 2nd CD Playas de Calviá | 2nd UD La Pared | 2nd Cartagena FC | 2nd Jerez CF | 2nd CD Oberena |
| 3rd CD Atlético Baleares | 3rd UD Realejos | 3rd AD Mar Menor | 3rd Moralo CP | 3rd Peña Sport FC |
| 4th UD Poblense | 4th UD Las Palmas B | 4th Águilas CF | 4th Mérida Promesas UD | 4th CD Ribaforada |

| Group XVI – Aragon | Group XVII – Castilla–La Mancha |
|---|---|
| 1st Real Zaragoza B | 1st Tomelloso CF |
| 2nd Utebo FC | 2nd CD Manchego |
| 3rd UD Casetas | 3rd Puertollano Industrial CF |
| 4th UD Barbastro | 4th Manzanares CF |

== Tables and results ==
=== Group A-1 ===
| Pos | Team | Pld | W | D | L | GF | GA | GD | Pts | Qualification or relegation |
|---|---|---|---|---|---|---|---|---|---|---|
| 1 | (Asturias) Real Oviedo B (substituted on) | 6 | 3 | 2 | 1 | 11 | 6 | +5 | 11 | Promoted to Segunda División B |
| 2 | (Galicia (Spain)) CCD Cerceda | 6 | 3 | 1 | 2 | 8 | 6 | +2 | 10 | |
| 3 | (Community of Madrid) AD Colmenar Viejo | 6 | 2 | 2 | 2 | 9 | 7 | +2 | 8 | |
| 4 | (Castile and León) CA Bembibre | 6 | 1 | 1 | 4 | 6 | 15 | −9 | 4 | |

Source: Fútbol Regional

| Home \ Away | BEM | CER | CVJ | OVI |
|---|---|---|---|---|
| CA Bembibre | — | 5–0 | 2–2 | 1–2 |
| CCD Cerceda | 2–0 | — | 2–1 | 0–0 |
| AD Colmenar Viejo | 4–0 | 1–0 | — | 1–1 |
| Real Oviedo B | 4–1 | 2–4 | 2–1 | — |

Updated to match(es) played on completed. Source: FutbolMe
Legend: Blue = home team win; Yellow = draw; Red = away team win.

=== Group A-2 ===
| Pos | Team | Pld | W | D | L | GF | GA | GD | Pts | Qualification or relegation |
|---|---|---|---|---|---|---|---|---|---|---|
| 1 | (Community of Madrid) CD Carabanchel (substituted on) | 6 | 3 | 3 | 0 | 13 | 4 | +9 | 12 | Promoted to Segunda División B |
| 2 | (Galicia (Spain)) Ponte Orense CF | 6 | 3 | 3 | 0 | 9 | 4 | +5 | 12 | |
| 3 | (Castile and León) CA Burgalés | 6 | 1 | 3 | 2 | 4 | 6 | −2 | 6 | |
| 4 | (Asturias) Real Titánico | 6 | 0 | 1 | 5 | 4 | 16 | −12 | 1 | |

Source: Fútbol Regional

| Home \ Away | BGL | CAR | POR | TIT |
|---|---|---|---|---|
| CA Burgalés | — | 0–0 | 0–1 | 2–0 |
| CD Carabanchel | 4–1 | — | 0–0 | 5–0 |
| Ponte Orense CF | 1–1 | 1–1 | — | 4–1 |
| Real Titánico | 0–0 | 2–3 | 1–2 | — |

Updated to match(es) played on completed. Source: FutbolMe
Legend: Blue = home team win; Yellow = draw; Red = away team win.

=== Group A-3 ===
| Pos | Team | Pld | W | D | L | GF | GA | GD | Pts | Qualification or relegation |
|---|---|---|---|---|---|---|---|---|---|---|
| 1 | (Galicia (Spain)) RC Celta de Vigo B (substituted on) | 6 | 3 | 2 | 1 | 9 | 4 | +5 | 11 | Promoted to Segunda División B |
| 2 | (Castile and León) Zamora CF | 6 | 3 | 2 | 1 | 8 | 5 | +3 | 11 | |
| 3 | (Community of Madrid) CF Rayo Majadahonda | 6 | 2 | 2 | 2 | 7 | 7 | 0 | 8 | |
| 4 | (Asturias) Caudal Deportivo | 6 | 1 | 0 | 5 | 4 | 12 | −8 | 3 | |

Source: Fútbol Regional

| Home \ Away | CAU | CEL | RMJ | ZAM |
|---|---|---|---|---|
| Caudal Deportivo | — | 1–0 | 2–4 | 1–2 |
| RC Celta de Vigo B | 3–0 | — | 1–1 | 2–2 |
| CF Rayo Majadahonda | 1–0 | 1–1 | — | 0–1 |
| Zamora CF | 4–2 | 1–0 | 1–1 | — |

Updated to match(es) played on completed. Source: FutbolMe
Legend: Blue = home team win; Yellow = draw; Red = away team win.

=== Group A-4 ===
| Pos | Team | Pld | W | D | L | GF | GA | GD | Pts | Qualification or relegation |
|---|---|---|---|---|---|---|---|---|---|---|
| 1 | (Asturias) Club Marino de Luanco (substituted on) | 6 | 4 | 1 | 1 | 13 | 2 | +11 | 13 | Promoted to Segunda División B |
| 2 | (Galicia (Spain)) CD Lalín | 6 | 3 | 2 | 1 | 7 | 8 | −1 | 11 | |
| 3 | (Castile and León) CD Laguna | 6 | 2 | 1 | 3 | 5 | 7 | −2 | 7 | |
| 4 | (Community of Madrid) AD Orcasitas | 6 | 0 | 2 | 4 | 3 | 11 | −8 | 2 | |

Source: Fútbol Regional

| Home \ Away | LAG | LAL | MAR | ORC |
|---|---|---|---|---|
| CD Laguna | — | 0–1 | 1–0 | 3–1 |
| CD Lalín | 3–0 | — | 0–0 | 2–1 |
| Club Marino de Luanco | 1–0 | 7–1 | — | 2–0 |
| AD Orcasitas | 1–1 | 0–0 | 0–3 | — |

Updated to match(es) played on completed. Source: FutbolMe
Legend: Blue = home team win; Yellow = draw; Red = away team win.

=== Group B-1 ===
| Pos | Team | Pld | W | D | L | GF | GA | GD | Pts | Qualification or relegation |
|---|---|---|---|---|---|---|---|---|---|---|
| 1 | (Cantabria) RS Gimnástica de Torrelavega (substituted on) | 6 | 4 | 2 | 0 | 14 | 3 | +11 | 14 | Promoted to Segunda División B |
| 2 | (Basque Country (autonomous community)) SD Zamudio | 6 | 3 | 3 | 0 | 9 | 5 | +4 | 12 | |
| 3 | (Navarre) CD Ribaforada | 6 | 1 | 1 | 4 | 4 | 13 | −9 | 4 | |
| 4 | (Aragon) UD Casetas | 6 | 1 | 0 | 5 | 7 | 13 | −6 | 3 | |

Source: Fútbol Regional

| Home \ Away | CAS | GIM | RIB | ZAM |
|---|---|---|---|---|
| UD Casetas | — | 2–5 | 2–0 | 2–4 |
| RS Gimnástica de Torrelavega | 1–0 | — | 3–0 | 1–1 |
| CD Ribaforada | 2–1 | 0–4 | — | 1–1 |
| SD Zamudio | 1–0 | 0–0 | 2–1 | — |

Updated to match(es) played on completed. Source: FutbolMe
Legend: Blue = home team win; Yellow = draw; Red = away team win.

=== Group B-2 ===
| Pos | Team | Pld | W | D | L | GF | GA | GD | Pts | Qualification or relegation |
|---|---|---|---|---|---|---|---|---|---|---|
| 1 | (Basque Country (autonomous community)) SD Gernika Club (substituted on) | 6 | 4 | 1 | 1 | 9 | 6 | +3 | 13 | Promoted to Segunda División B |
| 2 | (Cantabria) Racing de Santander B | 6 | 3 | 1 | 2 | 9 | 6 | +3 | 10 | |
| 3 | (Aragon) UD Barbastro | 6 | 1 | 2 | 3 | 6 | 9 | −3 | 5 | |
| 4 | (La Rioja) CD Calahorra | 6 | 1 | 2 | 3 | 6 | 9 | −3 | 5 | |

Source: Fútbol Regional

| Home \ Away | BAB | CAL | GER | RAC |
|---|---|---|---|---|
| UD Barbastro | — | 2–0 | 0–2 | 0–1 |
| CD Calahorra | 2–2 | — | 1–1 | 0–1 |
| SD Gernika Club | 2–0 | 2–1 | — | 1–0 |
| Racing de Santander B | 2–2 | 1–2 | 4–1 | — |

Updated to match(es) played on completed. Source: FutbolMe
Legend: Blue = home team win; Yellow = draw; Red = away team win.

=== Group B-3 ===
| Pos | Team | Pld | W | D | L | GF | GA | GD | Pts | Qualification or relegation |
|---|---|---|---|---|---|---|---|---|---|---|
| 1 | (Aragon) Real Zaragoza B (substituted on) | 6 | 4 | 1 | 1 | 14 | 6 | +8 | 13 | Promoted to Segunda División B |
| 2 | (Navarre) CD Oberena | 6 | 3 | 1 | 2 | 12 | 11 | +1 | 10 | |
| 3 | (Basque Country (autonomous community)) CD Elgoibar | 6 | 2 | 2 | 2 | 9 | 7 | +2 | 8 | |
| 4 | (Cantabria) CD Tropezón | 6 | 1 | 0 | 5 | 3 | 14 | −11 | 3 | |

Source: Fútbol Regional

| Home \ Away | ELG | OBE | TRO | ZAR |
|---|---|---|---|---|
| CD Elgoibar | — | 2–4 | 2–0 | 0–1 |
| CD Oberena | 1–1 | — | 3–1 | 3–2 |
| CD Tropezón | 0–3 | 1–0 | — | 1–4 |
| Real Zaragoza B | 1–1 | 4–1 | 2–0 | — |

Updated to match(es) played on completed. Source: FutbolMe
Legend: Blue = home team win; Yellow = draw; Red = away team win.

=== Group B-4 ===
| Pos | Team | Pld | W | D | L | GF | GA | GD | Pts | Qualification or relegation |
|---|---|---|---|---|---|---|---|---|---|---|
| 1 | (Basque Country (autonomous community)) Zalla UC (substituted on) | 6 | 4 | 2 | 0 | 6 | 1 | +5 | 14 | Promoted to Segunda División B |
| 2 | (Navarre) Peña Sport FC | 6 | 3 | 1 | 2 | 7 | 2 | +5 | 10 | |
| 3 | (Cantabria) SD Noja | 6 | 2 | 2 | 2 | 9 | 12 | −3 | 8 | |
| 4 | (Aragon) Utebo FC | 6 | 0 | 1 | 5 | 5 | 12 | −7 | 1 | |

Source: Fútbol Regional

| Home \ Away | NOJ | PÑS | UTE | ZAL |
|---|---|---|---|---|
| SD Noja | — | 1–0 | 5–3 | 0–0 |
| Peña Sport FC | 5–0 | — | 1–0 | 0–1 |
| Utebo FC | 2–2 | 0–1 | — | 0–1 |
| Zalla UC | 2–1 | 0–0 | 2–0 | — |

Updated to match(es) played on completed. Source: FutbolMe
Legend: Blue = home team win; Yellow = draw; Red = away team win.

=== Group C-1 ===
| Pos | Team | Pld | W | D | L | GF | GA | GD | Pts | Qualification or relegation |
|---|---|---|---|---|---|---|---|---|---|---|
| 1 | (Valencian Community) CF Gandía (substituted on) | 6 | 4 | 1 | 1 | 7 | 4 | +3 | 13 | Promoted to Segunda División B |
| 2 | (Balearic Islands) CF Sóller | 6 | 2 | 2 | 2 | 7 | 7 | 0 | 8 | |
| 3 | (Catalonia) CE Europa | 6 | 2 | 1 | 3 | 4 | 5 | −1 | 7 | |
| 4 | (Region of Murcia) Águilas CF | 6 | 2 | 0 | 4 | 10 | 12 | −2 | 6 | |

Source: Fútbol Regional

| Home \ Away | ÁGU | EUR | GAN | SÓL |
|---|---|---|---|---|
| Águilas CF | — | 3–1 | 2–1 | 2–3 |
| CE Europa | 2–0 | — | 0–1 | 0–0 |
| CF Gandía | 2–1 | 1–0 | — | 2–1 |
| CF Sóller | 3–2 | 0–1 | 0–0 | — |

Updated to match(es) played on completed. Source: FutbolMe
Legend: Blue = home team win; Yellow = draw; Red = away team win.

=== Group C-2 ===
| Pos | Team | Pld | W | D | L | GF | GA | GD | Pts | Qualification or relegation |
|---|---|---|---|---|---|---|---|---|---|---|
| 1 | (Region of Murcia) AD Mar Menor (substituted on) | 6 | 4 | 2 | 0 | 10 | 3 | +7 | 14 | Promoted to Segunda División B |
| 2 | (Valencian Community) Pinoso CF | 6 | 3 | 0 | 3 | 10 | 7 | +3 | 9 | |
| 3 | (Catalonia) UE Tàrrega | 6 | 2 | 2 | 2 | 10 | 8 | +2 | 8 | |
| 4 | (Balearic Islands) CD Playas de Calviá | 6 | 1 | 0 | 5 | 4 | 16 | −12 | 3 | |

Source: Fútbol Regional

| Home \ Away | MAR | PCA | PIN | TÀR |
|---|---|---|---|---|
| AD Mar Menor | — | 4–0 | 2–1 | 1–1 |
| CD Playas de Calviá | 0–1 | — | 1–2 | 2–1 |
| Pinoso CF | 0–1 | 4–0 | — | 1–2 |
| UE Tàrrega | 1–1 | 4–1 | 1–2 | — |

Updated to match(es) played on completed. Source: FutbolMe
Legend: Blue = home team win; Yellow = draw; Red = away team win.

=== Group C-3 ===
| Pos | Team | Pld | W | D | L | GF | GA | GD | Pts | Qualification or relegation |
|---|---|---|---|---|---|---|---|---|---|---|
| 1 | (Valencian Community) Llíria CF (substituted on) | 6 | 4 | 1 | 1 | 13 | 3 | +10 | 13 | Promoted to Segunda División B |
| 2 | (Region of Murcia) Cartagena FC | 6 | 3 | 0 | 3 | 10 | 12 | −2 | 9 | |
| 3 | (Balearic Islands) UD Poblense | 6 | 2 | 1 | 3 | 7 | 11 | −4 | 7 | |
| 4 | (Catalonia) FC Santboià | 6 | 1 | 2 | 3 | 5 | 9 | −4 | 5 | |

Source: Fútbol Regional

| Home \ Away | CAR | LLÍ | POB | SBO |
|---|---|---|---|---|
| Cartagena FC | — | 2–1 | 3–0 | 3–1 |
| Llíria CF | 6–1 | — | 2–0 | 1–0 |
| UD Poblense | 2–1 | 1–3 | — | 3–1 |
| FC Santboià | 2–1 | 0–0 | 1–1 | — |

Updated to match(es) played on completed. Source: FutbolMe
Legend: Blue = home team win; Yellow = draw; Red = away team win.

=== Group C-4 ===
| Pos | Team | Pld | W | D | L | GF | GA | GD | Pts | Qualification or relegation |
|---|---|---|---|---|---|---|---|---|---|---|
| 1 | (Region of Murcia) Real Murcia (substituted on) | 6 | 5 | 1 | 0 | 13 | 0 | +13 | 16 | Promoted to Segunda División B |
| 2 | (Valencian Community) CD Acero | 6 | 2 | 3 | 1 | 6 | 7 | −1 | 9 | |
| 3 | (Catalonia) Palamós CF | 6 | 1 | 1 | 4 | 6 | 10 | −4 | 4 | |
| 4 | (Balearic Islands) CD Atlético Baleares | 6 | 1 | 1 | 4 | 4 | 12 | −8 | 4 | |

Source: Fútbol Regional

| Home \ Away | ACE | BAL | MUR | PAL |
|---|---|---|---|---|
| CD Acero | — | 4–1 | 0–0 | 1–0 |
| CD Atlético Baleares | 0–0 | — | 0–1 | 2–1 |
| Real Murcia | 5–0 | 2–0 | — | 3–0 |
| Palamós CF | 1–1 | 4–1 | 0–2 | — |

Updated to match(es) played on completed. Source: FutbolMe
Legend: Blue = home team win; Yellow = draw; Red = away team win.

=== Group D-1 ===
| Pos | Team | Pld | W | D | L | GF | GA | GD | Pts | Qualification or relegation |
|---|---|---|---|---|---|---|---|---|---|---|
| 1 | (Castilla–La Mancha) CD Manchego (substituted on) | 6 | 4 | 2 | 0 | 8 | 1 | +7 | 14 | Promoted to Segunda División B |
| 2 | (Extremadura) Moralo CP | 6 | 2 | 2 | 2 | 5 | 2 | +3 | 8 | |
| 3 | (Andalusia) Motril CF | 6 | 1 | 2 | 3 | 2 | 6 | −4 | 5 | |
| 4 | (Andalusia) CD San Fernando | 6 | 1 | 2 | 3 | 2 | 8 | −6 | 5 | |

Source: Fútbol Regional

| Home \ Away | MAN | MOR | MOT | SFE |
|---|---|---|---|---|
| CD Manchego | — | 1–0 | 0–0 | 2–0 |
| Moralo CP | 0–1 | — | 4–0 | 0–0 |
| Motril CF | 0–0 | 0–1 | — | 2–0 |
| CD San Fernando | 0–0 | 1–4 | 1–0 | — |

Updated to match(es) played on completed. Source: FutbolMe
Legend: Blue = home team win; Yellow = draw; Red = away team win.

=== Group D-2 ===
| Pos | Team | Pld | W | D | L | GF | GA | GD | Pts | Qualification or relegation |
|---|---|---|---|---|---|---|---|---|---|---|
| 1 | (Andalusia) CP Ejido (substituted on) | 6 | 4 | 1 | 1 | 11 | 1 | +10 | 13 | Promoted to Segunda División B |
| 2 | (Andalusia) Atlético Sanluqueño CF | 6 | 4 | 0 | 2 | 8 | 4 | +4 | 12 | |
| 3 | (Extremadura) Mérida Promesas UD | 6 | 3 | 1 | 2 | 7 | 6 | +1 | 10 | |
| 4 | (Castilla–La Mancha) Puertollano Industrial CF | 6 | 0 | 0 | 6 | 2 | 17 | −15 | 0 | |

Source: Fútbol Regional

| Home \ Away | ASL | EJI | MEP | PUI |
|---|---|---|---|---|
| Atlético Sanluqueño CF | — | 1–0 | 2–0 | 3–0 |
| CP Ejido | 2–0 | — | 3–0 | 5–0 |
| Mérida Promesas UD | 1–0 | 0–0 | — | 4–0 |
| Puertollano Industrial CF | 1–2 | 0–1 | 1–2 | — |

Updated to match(es) played on completed. Source: FutbolMe
Legend: Blue = home team win; Yellow = draw; Red = away team win.

=== Group D-3 ===
| Pos | Team | Pld | W | D | L | GF | GA | GD | Pts | Qualification or relegation |
|---|---|---|---|---|---|---|---|---|---|---|
| 1 | (Extremadura) CP Cacereño (substituted on) | 6 | 4 | 0 | 2 | 18 | 5 | +13 | 12 | Promoted to Segunda División B |
| 2 | (Andalusia) Isla Cristina CD | 6 | 4 | 0 | 2 | 19 | 9 | +10 | 12 | |
| 3 | (Andalusia) UD Maracena | 6 | 3 | 0 | 3 | 9 | 14 | −5 | 9 | |
| 4 | (Castilla–La Mancha) Manzanares CF | 6 | 1 | 0 | 5 | 3 | 21 | −18 | 3 | |

Source: Fútbol Regional

| Home \ Away | CAC | ICR | MNZ | MAR |
|---|---|---|---|---|
| CP Cacereño | — | 0–2 | 3–1 | 5–1 |
| Isla Cristina CD | 0–5 | — | 3–1 | 5–0 |
| Manzanares CF | 0–4 | 1–6 | — | 2–1 |
| UD Maracena | 3–0 | 3–0 | 2–0 | — |

Updated to match(es) played on completed. Source: FutbolMe
Legend: Blue = home team win; Yellow = draw; Red = away team win.

=== Group D-4 ===
| Pos | Team | Pld | W | D | L | GF | GA | GD | Pts | Qualification or relegation |
|---|---|---|---|---|---|---|---|---|---|---|
| 1 | (Andalusia) Guadix CF (substituted on) | 6 | 4 | 1 | 1 | 9 | 4 | +5 | 13 | Promoted to Segunda División B |
| 2 | (Castilla–La Mancha) Tomelloso CF | 6 | 3 | 2 | 1 | 10 | 3 | +7 | 11 | |
| 3 | (Extremadura) Jerez CF | 6 | 2 | 2 | 2 | 6 | 9 | −3 | 8 | |
| 4 | (Andalusia) Chiclana CF | 6 | 0 | 1 | 5 | 5 | 14 | −9 | 1 | |

Source: Fútbol Regional

| Home \ Away | CHI | GUA | JER | TOM |
|---|---|---|---|---|
| Chiclana CF | — | 0–1 | 2–2 | 1–3 |
| Guadix CF | 3–1 | — | 3–1 | 1–0 |
| Jerez CF | 2–1 | 1–0 | — | 0–0 |
| Tomelloso CF | 3–0 | 1–1 | 3–0 | — |

Updated to match(es) played on completed. Source: FutbolMe
Legend: Blue = home team win; Yellow = draw; Red = away team win.

=== Group E ===
| Pos | Team | Pld | W | D | L | GF | GA | GD | Pts | Qualification or relegation |
|---|---|---|---|---|---|---|---|---|---|---|
| 1 | (Canary Islands) UD Realejos (substituted on) | 6 | 2 | 4 | 0 | 8 | 6 | +2 | 10 | Promoted to Segunda División B |
| 2 | (Canary Islands) UD Las Palmas B | 6 | 2 | 2 | 2 | 4 | 5 | −1 | 8 | |
| 3 | (Canary Islands) UD La Pared | 6 | 1 | 3 | 2 | 4 | 5 | −1 | 6 | |
| 4 | (Canary Islands) CD Corralejo | 6 | 1 | 3 | 2 | 5 | 5 | 0 | 6 | |

Source: Fútbol Regional

| Home \ Away | COR | LPR | LPA | REA |
|---|---|---|---|---|
| CD Corralejo | — | 0–0 | 2–0 | 1–1 |
| UD La Pared | 2–1 | — | 0–0 | 1–1 |
| UD Las Palmas B | 1–0 | 1–0 | — | 1–1 |
| UD Realejos | 1–1 | 2–1 | 2–1 | — |

Updated to match(es) played on completed. Source: FutbolMe
Legend: Blue = home team win; Yellow = draw; Red = away team win.

== Teams promoted ==
17 teams were promoted to Segunda División B.

Group I – Galicia (Galicia (Spain))

- RC Celta de Vigo B

Group II – Asturias

- Real Oviedo B
- Club Marino de Luanco

Group III – Cantabria

- RS Gimnástica de Torrelavega

Group IV – Basque Country (Basque Country (autonomous community))

- Zalla UC
- SD Gernika Club

Group V – Catalonia

- None

Group VI – Valencian Community

- CF Llíria
- CF Gandía

Group VII – Community of Madrid

- CD Carabanchel

Group VIII – Castile and León

- None

Group IX – E. Andalusia and Melilla

- CP Ejido
- Guadix CF

Group X – W. Andalusia and Ceuta

- None

Group XI – Balearic Islands

- None

Group XII – Canary Islands

- UD Realejos

Group XIII – Region of Murcia

- Real Murcia
- AD Mar Menor

Group XIV – Extremadura

- CP Cacereño

Group XV – Navarre and La Rioja

- None

Group XVI – Aragon

- Real Zaragoza B

Group XVII – Castilla–La Mancha

- CD Manchego
