= Luis Peteiro =

Spanish footballer

Personal information
- Full name: Luis Peteiro Ramos
- Date of birth: 26 May 1998 (age 28)
- Place of birth: Madrid, Spain
- Position: Right back

Youth career
- Vallecas
- 2015–2016: Rayo Vallecano
- 2016–2017: Trival Valderas

Senior career*
Years	Team	Apps	(Gls)
2017–2018	Trival Valderas B	6	(0)
2018	Vallecas	9	(1)
2018–2019	Betis San Isidro	28	(5)
2019–2021	Fuenlabrada B	27	(5)
2020	Fuenlabrada	1	(0)
2021–2022	Extremadura B	12	(0)
2022	Extremadura	7	(0)
2022	Huesca B	7	(0)
2022	RC Alcobendas	5	(0)
2024	Toledo	18	(0)
- * Club domestic league appearances and goals as of 23 June 2024

Luis Peteiro Ramos (born 26 May 1998) is a Spanish footballer who plays as a right back.

== Club career ==
Born in Madrid, Peteiro represented Vallecas CF, Rayo Vallecano and CF Trival Valderas as a youth, and made his senior debut for the latter's B-team in the 2017–18 season, in the regional leagues. In January 2018, he moved back to Vallecas after overcoming a serious knee injury.

Ahead of the 2018–19 campaign, Peteiro moved to CD Betis San Isidro, still in the lower leagues. After being a regular starter he signed for CF Fuenlabrada, being initially assigned to the reserves in the sixth division.

Peteiro made his first-team debut on 8 August 2020, starting in a 1–2 away loss at Deportivo de La Coruña in the Segunda División, as several first-team players were out due to a COVID-19 outbreak in the squad. He subsequently appeared exclusively with the B's before joining another reserve team, Extremadura UD B of the Tercera División RFEF, on 26 July 2021.

In January 2022, as Extremadura's financial problems worsened and most of the first team players left the club, Peteiro was definitely promoted to the main squad in Primera División RFEF, and played seven matches before the club's elimination from the competition. On 23 March, he signed for SD Huesca B in Segunda División RFEF.
