= Kazaki Nakagawa =

Japanese footballer

Kazaki Nakagawa 中川 風希
Personal information
- Full name: Kazaki Nakagawa
- Date of birth: 3 July 1995 (age 31)
- Place of birth: Kanagawa, Japan
- Height: 1.75 m (5 ft 9 in)
- Position: Attacking midfielder

Youth career
- 2008–2010: Bunan High School

College career
| Years | Team | Apps | (Gls) |
| 2011–2014 | Kanto Gakuin University | | |

Senior career*
| Years | Team | Apps | (Gls) |
| 2015–2016 | Vallecas | | |
| 2016–2017 | Betis San Isidro | | |
| 2017–2019 | FC Ryukyu | 45 | (17) |
| 2019 | Yokohama F. Marinos | 3 | (0) |
| 2020–2021 | Kyoto Sanga | 14 | (2) |
| 2021 | → FC Ryukyu (loan) | 11 | (1) |
| 2022–2023 | FC Imabari | 46 | (15) |
| 2023–2026 | Fujieda MYFC | 51 | (7) |
| 2026 | Semen Padang | 10 | (0) |
- * Club domestic league appearances and goals as of 15 May 2026

Kazaki Nakagawa (中川 風希, Nakagawa Kazaki; born July 3, 1995) is a Japanese professional footballer who plays as an attacking midfielder.

== Career ==
From 2015, Kazaki Nakagawa played for Spanish clubs Vallecas and Betis San Isidro. In August 2017, he moved back to Japan and joined J3 League side FC Ryukyu. He helped the Okinawans gain promotion to J2 League in 2018 and was snapped up by J1 side Yokohama F. Marinos in March 2019.

== Career statistics ==
Updated to 15 March 2019.

Appearances and goals by club, season and competition
| Club | Season | League | | | Emperor's Cup | | J.League Cup | | Total | |
| Club | Season | Division | Apps | Goals | Apps | Goals | Apps | Goals | Apps | Goals |
|---|---|---|---|---|---|---|---|---|---|---|
| FC Ryukyu | 2017 | J3 League | 10 | 1 | 0 | 0 | — | | 10 | 1 |
| FC Ryukyu | 2018 | J3 League | 32 | 16 | 1 | 1 | — | | 33 | 17 |
| FC Ryukyu | 2019 | J2 League | 3 | 0 | 0 | 0 | — | | 3 | 0 |
| Yokohama F. Marinos | 2019 | J1 League | 0 | 0 | 0 | 0 | 0 | 0 | 0 | 0 |
| Career total | | | 45 | 17 | 1 | 1 | 0 | 0 | 46 | 18 |
