= Guti (footballer, born 1999) =

Spanish footballer

Personal information
- Full name: Álvaro Gutiérrez Custodio
- Date of birth: 30 December 2000 (age 25)
- Place of birth: Leganés, Spain
- Position: Midfielder

Team information
- Current team: Quintanar del Rey
- Number: 20

Youth career
- 2016–2019: Fuenlabrada

Senior career*
Years	Team	Apps	(Gls)
2019–2021	Fuenlabrada B	39	(13)
2020	Fuenlabrada	1	(0)
2021–2022	Torrejón	8	(1)
2022	Getafe B	11	(1)
2022–2023	Torrejón	25	(1)
2023–2024	Trival Valderas	24	(0)
2024–2025	Torrejón	29	(10)
2025–	Quintanar del Rey	4	(0)
- * Club domestic league appearances and goals as of 28 September 2025

Álvaro Gutiérrez Custodio (born 30 December 2000), commonly known as Guti, is a Spanish footballer who plays as a midfielder for Segunda Federación club Quintanar del Rey.

== Club career ==
Born in Leganés, Community of Madrid, Guti joined CF Fuenlabrada's youth setup in September 2016. He was promoted to the reserves ahead of the 2019–20 season, and made his senior debut on 15 September 2019 by starting in a 2–2 home draw against CD Betis San Isidro.

Guti scored his first senior goal on 27 October 2019, netting his team's third in a 5–2 away routing of EMF Aluche. The following 23 February, he scored a brace in a 4–0 home success over AD Sporting Bazán.

Guti made his first team debut on 8 August 2020, coming on as a late substitute for Alberto Fernández in a 1–2 away loss at Deportivo de La Coruña in the Segunda División championship, as several of first team players were out due to COVID-19 pandemic occurring in the squad.

On 8 September 2021, Guti signed for Tercera División RFEF side AD Torrejón CF. The following 4 February, he moved to Getafe CF, being initially assigned to the reserves also in the fifth level.
