= Álvaro Ruvira =

Spanish footballer

Personal information
- Full name: Álvaro Ruvira Yáñez
- Date of birth: 23 March 2000 (age 26)
- Place of birth: Pinoso, Spain
- Height: 1.85 m (6 ft 1 in)
- Position: Goalkeeper

Youth career
- 2007–2010: Pinoso
- 2010–2018: Hércules
- 2018–2019: Getafe

Senior career*
Years	Team	Apps	(Gls)
2017–2018	Hércules B	4	(0)
2019–2021	Fuenlabrada B	28	(0)
2020	Fuenlabrada	1	(0)
- * Club domestic league appearances and goals as of 23 May 2021

Álvaro Ruvira Yáñez (born 23 March 2000) is a Spanish footballer who plays as a goalkeeper.

== Club career ==
Born in Pinoso, Valencian Community, Ruvira joined Hércules CF's youth setup in 2010, aged ten, from hometown side Pinoso CF.

Ruvira made his senior debut with the reserves on 9 September 2017, starting in a 3–2 Regional Preferente home win against Benferri CF. The following July, after four appearances, he signed for Getafe CF and returned to the youth setup.

Ahead of the 2019–20 season, Ruvira moved to CF Fuenlabrada and was assigned to the B-side in the regional leagues. He made his first-team debut on 8 August 2020, starting in a 1–2 away loss at Deportivo de La Coruña in the Segunda División, as several first-team players were out due to a COVID-19 outbreak in the squad.
