= 1995–96 Tercera División =

Tercera División
- Season: 1995–96

For association football in Spain, the 1995–96 Tercera División season is the 19th season since the establishment of the tier four.

== League table ==
=== Group 1 ===
Pos	Team	Pld	W	D	L	GF	GA	GD	Pts	Qualification or relegation
1	CCD Cerceda	38	21	10	7	63	31	+32	73	Promotion play-offs
2	Puente Ourense CF	38	22	6	10	70	43	+27	72	Promotion play-offs
3	Celta Turista	38	21	8	9	92	44	+48	71	Promotion play-offs
4	CD Lalín	38	19	6	13	52	42	+10	63	Promotion play-offs
5	Caselas FC	38	18	8	12	72	56	+16	62	
6	CD Estradense	38	15	15	8	40	33	+7	60	
7	Viveiro CF	38	15	13	10	61	50	+11	58	
8	Porriño Industrial FC	38	15	12	11	63	51	+12	57	
9	Betanzos CF	38	15	10	13	64	58	+6	55	
10	Villalonga CF	38	15	9	14	66	67	−1	54	
11	CD Mosteiro	38	13	13	12	47	44	+3	52	
12	Ribadeo CF	38	14	9	15	58	72	−14	51	
13	UD Xove Lago	38	12	14	12	46	44	+2	50	
14	Gran Peña FC	38	12	12	14	59	53	+6	48	
15	UD Somozas	38	9	18	11	57	59	−2	45	
16	Arosa SC	38	11	11	16	49	63	−14	44	
17	Mindoniense CF	38	9	10	19	30	58	−28	37	
18	SD Burela (R)	38	8	12	18	40	68	−28	36	Relegation
19	Flavia SD (R)	38	6	6	26	32	79	−47	24	Relegation
20	Coruxo FC (R)	38	4	10	24	34	80	−46	22	Relegation

Source: Fútbol Regional
(R) Relegated

=== Group 2 ===
Pos	Team	Pld	W	D	L	GF	GA	GD	Pts	Qualification or relegation
1	Real Titánico	38	23	9	6	63	39	+24	78	Promotion play-offs
2	Real Oviedo B	38	22	9	7	89	36	+53	75	Promotion play-offs
3	Club Marino de Luanco	38	22	9	7	67	31	+36	75	Promotion play-offs
4	Caudal Deportivo	38	19	8	11	66	39	+27	65	Promotion play-offs
5	CD Mosconia	38	17	13	8	43	29	+14	64	
6	AD Universidad de Oviedo	38	17	9	12	48	52	−4	60	
7	UD Gijón Industrial	38	17	9	12	45	38	+7	60	
8	CD Lealtad	38	15	13	10	63	53	+10	58	
9	Navia CF	38	16	9	13	52	33	+19	57	
10	Ribadesella CF	38	16	8	14	65	57	+8	56	
11	SD Rey Aurelio	38	14	11	13	42	42	0	53	
12	Club Siero	38	14	11	13	45	41	+4	53	
13	Navarro CF	38	12	8	18	46	54	−8	44	
14	CD Turón	38	11	11	16	34	51	−17	44	
15	Club Hispano de Castrillón	38	11	9	18	48	61	−13	42	
16	Pumarín CF	38	11	8	19	44	55	−11	41	
17	SD Colloto	38	11	7	20	40	66	−26	40	
18	Deportiva Piloñesa (R)	38	9	9	20	43	62	−19	36	Relegation
19	Valdesoto CF (R)	38	7	9	22	30	77	−47	30	Relegation
20	CD Praviano (R)	38	2	9	27	21	78	−57	15	Relegation

Source: Fútbol Regional
(R) Relegated

=== Group 3 ===
Pos	Team	Pld	W	D	L	GF	GA	GD	Pts	Qualification or relegation
1	RS Gimnástica de Torrelavega	38	25	9	4	80	17	+63	84	Promotion play-offs
2	Racing de Santander B	38	25	5	8	99	32	+67	80	Promotion play-offs
3	CD Tropezón	38	22	11	5	74	33	+41	77	Promotion play-offs
4	SD Noja	38	23	8	7	67	23	+44	77	Promotion play-offs
5	Ribamontán al Mar CF	38	24	5	9	76	38	+38	77	
6	Castro FC	38	17	8	13	45	46	−1	59	
7	Comillas CF	38	17	6	15	53	42	+11	57	
8	Velarde CF	38	15	10	13	49	39	+10	55	
9	SD Textil Escudo	38	17	4	17	54	57	−3	55	
10	CD Guarnizo	38	14	10	14	46	52	−6	52	
11	CD Bezana	38	14	10	14	49	49	0	52	
12	Ayrón Club	38	14	7	17	45	60	−15	49	
13	CD Laredo	38	13	8	17	36	39	−3	47	
14	UM Escobedo	38	12	8	18	46	53	−7	44	
15	SD Revilla	38	10	13	15	31	51	−20	43	
16	CD Cayón	38	11	10	17	45	48	−3	43	
17	SD Unión Club	38	10	11	17	46	56	−10	41	
18	Marina de Cudeyo CF (R)	38	10	7	21	38	67	−29	37	Relegation
19	CD Pontejos (R)	38	8	6	24	41	81	−40	30	Relegation
20	CD Colindres (R)	38	0	2	36	11	148	−137	2	Relegation

Source: Fútbol Regional
(R) Relegated

=== Group 4 ===
Pos	Team	Pld	W	D	L	GF	GA	GD	Pts	Qualification or relegation
1	Zalla UC	38	22	12	4	47	15	+32	78	Promotion play-offs
2	SD Zamudio	38	19	14	5	52	22	+30	71	Promotion play-offs
3	SD Gernika Club	38	18	15	5	65	38	+27	69	Promotion play-offs
4	CD Elgoibar	38	19	9	10	58	38	+20	66	Promotion play-offs
5	CD Getxo	38	15	13	10	53	39	+14	58	
6	Deportivo Alavés B	38	15	11	12	52	40	+12	56	
7	SD Urola KE	38	13	14	11	50	43	+7	53	
8	CD Touring	38	13	12	13	52	52	0	51	
9	CD Aurrerá Ondarroa	38	14	9	15	38	44	−6	51	
10	SD Amorebieta	38	13	11	14	38	54	−16	50	
11	Aloña Mendi KE	38	12	14	12	49	51	−2	50	
12	CD Hernani	38	12	12	14	43	45	−2	48	
13	CD Lagun Onak	38	12	11	15	41	51	−10	47	
14	CD Basconia	38	13	7	18	41	56	−15	46	
15	Balmaseda CF	38	11	13	14	36	56	−20	46	
16	Zorroza CF	38	12	10	16	39	39	0	46	
17	CD Santurtzi	38	11	12	15	31	35	−4	45	
18	Mondragón CF (R)	38	11	7	20	50	57	−7	40	Relegation
19	Universidad del País Vasco-EHU (R)	38	9	9	20	46	67	−21	36	Relegation
20	CD Juventus (R)	38	5	7	26	30	69	−39	22	Relegation

Source: Fútbol Regional
(R) Relegated

=== Group 5 ===
Pos	Team	Pld	W	D	L	GF	GA	GD	Pts	Qualification or relegation
1	UE Tàrrega	38	20	13	5	80	35	+45	73	Promotion play-offs
2	CE Europa	38	20	10	8	71	45	+26	70	Promotion play-offs
3	FC Santboià	38	20	8	10	64	47	+17	68	Promotion play-offs
4	Palamós CF	38	17	12	9	50	32	+18	63	Promotion play-offs
5	Atlètic Roda de Barà	38	15	10	13	55	46	+9	55	
6	CE Premià	38	15	10	13	54	53	+1	55	
7	CF Balaguer	38	15	8	15	52	49	+3	53	
8	Vilobí CF	38	12	16	10	67	48	+19	52	
9	CD Tortosa	38	15	7	16	56	49	+7	52	
10	CE Mataró	38	14	9	15	53	58	−5	51	
11	CD Banyoles	38	14	6	18	50	59	−9	48	
12	EC Granollers	38	11	14	13	40	44	−4	47	
13	Girona FC	38	12	11	15	43	55	−12	47	
14	UE Sants	38	12	11	15	42	60	−18	47	
15	UD Cerdanyola de Mataró	38	12	11	15	35	52	−17	47	
16	CE Júpiter	38	12	10	16	60	63	−3	46	
17	UE Rubí	38	11	12	15	47	46	+1	45	
18	UA Horta (R)	38	11	11	16	43	63	−20	44	Relegation
19	CF Igualada (R)	38	13	4	21	48	75	−27	43	Relegation
20	AD Guíxols (R)	38	5	15	18	40	71	−31	30	Relegation

Source: Fútbol Regional
(R) Relegated

=== Group 6 ===
Pos	Team	Pld	W	D	L	GF	GA	GD	Pts	Qualification or relegation
1	Llíria CF	38	23	8	7	66	29	+37	77	Promotion play-offs
2	CD Acero	38	21	11	6	78	30	+48	74	Promotion play-offs
3	CF Gandía	38	20	10	8	64	31	+33	70	Promotion play-offs
4	Pinoso CF	38	18	11	9	51	30	+21	65	Promotion play-offs
5	AD Español de San Vicente	38	18	11	9	42	29	+13	65	
6	CD Utiel	38	19	8	11	56	41	+15	65	
7	CD Onda	38	17	11	10	66	36	+30	62	
8	SD Sueca	38	18	7	13	58	44	+14	61	
9	CD Eldense	38	17	9	12	54	41	+13	60	
10	Gimnástico CF	38	15	10	13	47	43	+4	55	
11	Burjassot CF	38	14	12	12	49	41	+8	54	
12	Alicante CF	38	12	13	13	37	46	−9	49	
13	UD Vall de Uxó	38	11	12	15	38	48	−10	45	
14	Crevillente Deportivo	38	12	8	18	28	50	−22	44	
15	CD Almoradí	38	12	7	19	38	48	−10	43	
16	CD Olímpic de Xàtiva	38	11	6	21	47	54	−7	39	
17	Mutxamel CF	38	8	12	18	43	62	−19	36	
18	CD Alaquàs (R)	38	9	9	20	30	64	−34	36	Relegation
19	CD Villena (R)	38	5	8	25	20	79	−59	23	Relegation
20	CE Alberic (R)	38	6	5	27	22	88	−66	23	Relegation

Source: Fútbol Regional
(R) Relegated

=== Group 7 ===
Pos	Team	Pld	W	D	L	GF	GA	GD	Pts	Qualification or relegation
1	CF Rayo Majadahonda	38	24	7	7	74	38	+36	79	Promotion play-offs
2	AD Orcasitas	38	23	2	13	56	48	+8	71	Promotion play-offs
3	CD Carabanchel	38	20	8	10	64	40	+24	68	Promotion play-offs
4	AD Colmenar Viejo	38	20	7	11	72	45	+27	67	Promotion play-offs
5	CP Amorós	38	18	6	14	62	55	+7	60	
6	SR Villaverde-Boetticher CF	38	15	13	10	48	41	+7	58	
7	AD Parla	38	15	12	11	49	37	+12	57	
8	AD Torrejón	38	17	6	15	47	52	−5	57	
9	Rayo Vallecano B	38	13	12	13	49	38	+11	51	
10	RSD Alcalá	38	12	14	12	50	48	+2	50	
11	Atlético Valdemoro	38	13	10	15	42	44	−2	49	
12	CD Pegaso	38	13	8	17	43	52	−9	47	
13	CD Fuencarral	38	12	11	15	48	59	−11	47	
14	CD San Fernando de Henares	38	11	13	14	46	44	+2	46	
15	CD Puerta Bonita	38	11	11	16	56	63	−7	44	
16	CD Coslada	38	10	14	14	44	51	−7	44	
17	CDA Navalcarnero (R)	38	11	9	18	32	54	−22	42	Relegation
18	CD Las Rozas (R)	38	10	10	18	42	57	−15	40	Relegation
19	Vallecas CF (R)	38	10	7	21	33	50	−17	37	Relegation
20	CD Mejoreño (R)	38	8	8	22	39	80	−41	32	Relegation

Source: Fútbol Regional
(R) Relegated

=== Group 8 ===
Pos	Team	Pld	W	D	L	GF	GA	GD	Pts	Qualification or relegation
1	CD Laguna	40	22	11	7	68	34	+34	77	Promotion play-offs
2	Zamora CF	40	20	14	6	67	29	+38	74	Promotion play-offs
3	CA Bembibre	40	22	8	10	78	47	+31	74	Promotion play-offs
4	Atlético Burgalés	40	21	8	11	57	32	+25	71	Promotion play-offs
5	Real Ávila CF	40	19	8	13	61	37	+24	65	
6	SD Almazán	40	16	14	10	56	39	+17	62	
7	Arandina CF	40	16	10	14	59	47	+12	58	
8	SD Gimástica Segoviana	40	16	10	14	59	47	+12	58	
9	RCD Ribert	40	14	13	13	53	53	0	55	
10	Real Burgos CF	40	13	15	12	50	51	−1	54	
11	La Bañeza FC	40	14	11	15	49	58	−9	53	
12	SD Hullera Vasco-Leonesa	40	13	14	13	40	42	−2	53	
13	CD Salmantino	40	12	14	14	43	48	−5	50	
14	SD Ponferradina	40	12	14	14	45	50	−5	50	
15	Atlético Astorga FC	40	14	8	18	41	50	−9	50	
16	Racing Lermeño	40	12	13	15	37	49	−12	49	
17	CD Íscar Industrial	40	13	9	18	55	63	−8	48	
18	SD Gimnástica Medinense (R)	40	13	6	21	40	57	−17	45	Relegation
19	CD Endesa Ponferrada (R)	40	11	10	19	51	64	−13	43	Relegation
20	CD Benavente (R)	40	8	17	15	36	48	−12	41	Relegation
21	SC Uxama (R)	40	3	5	32	14	114	−100	14	Relegation

Source: Fútbol Regional
(R) Relegated

=== Group 9 ===
Pos	Team	Pld	W	D	L	GF	GA	GD	Pts	Qualification or relegation
1	Polideportivo Ejido	38	23	8	7	80	32	+48	77	Promotion play-offs
2	UD Maracena	38	21	13	4	56	27	+29	76	Promotion play-offs
3	Guadix CF	38	22	9	7	55	25	+30	75	Promotion play-offs
4	Motril CF	38	20	13	5	55	30	+25	73	Promotion play-offs
5	CD Linares	38	22	6	10	54	22	+32	72	
6	Juventud de Torremolinos CF	38	17	9	12	64	39	+25	60	
7	CF Antequera–Puerto Malagueño	38	15	13	10	47	39	+8	58	
8	CP Granada 74	38	14	13	11	39	36	+3	55	
9	CD Roquetas	38	14	11	13	59	50	+9	53	
10	Atarfe Industrial CF	38	15	6	17	53	62	−9	51	
11	Baeza CF	38	11	15	12	45	44	+1	48	
12	UD San Isidro de Níjar	38	13	9	16	46	57	−11	48	
13	CD Baza	38	12	9	17	39	55	−16	45	
14	Arenas de Armilla CD	38	13	6	19	48	62	−14	45	
15	UD Manilva-Sabinillas	38	12	9	17	49	59	−10	45	
16	Martos CD	38	12	7	19	43	55	−12	43	
17	CDUD Carboneras	38	11	7	20	40	61	−21	40	
18	CD Alhaurino (R)	38	8	11	19	30	47	−17	35	Relegation
19	Plus Ultra CF (R)	38	6	7	25	32	74	−42	25	Relegation
20	AD Adra (R)	38	5	7	26	25	83	−58	22	Relegation

Source: Fútbol Regional
(R) Relegated

=== Group 10 ===
Pos	Team	Pld	W	D	L	GF	GA	GD	Pts	Qualification or relegation
1	CD San Fernando	38	20	10	8	71	34	+37	70	Promotion play-offs
2	Atlético Sanluqueño CF	38	18	13	7	60	27	+33	67	Promotion play-offs
3	Isla Cristina CD	38	18	11	9	61	39	+22	65	Promotion play-offs
4	Chiclana CF	38	18	10	10	53	34	+19	64	Promotion play-offs
5	CD San Roque de Lepe	38	18	9	11	54	43	+11	63	
6	Viña Verde Montilla CD	38	17	11	10	49	31	+18	62	
7	La Palma CF	38	16	11	11	65	47	+18	59	
8	CD Pozoblanco	38	16	10	12	52	41	+11	58	
9	Coria CF	38	17	7	14	46	39	+7	58	
10	RB Linense	38	13	16	9	48	36	+12	55	
11	CD Rota	38	14	12	12	47	44	+3	54	
12	UD Los Palacios	38	14	8	16	43	53	−10	50	
13	Dos Hermanas CF	38	12	12	14	62	68	−6	48	
14	Algeciras CF	38	10	17	11	45	41	+4	47	
15	CD Mairena	38	11	11	16	41	57	−16	44	
16	Cádiz CF B	38	11	10	17	55	60	−5	43	
17	Conil CF	38	9	12	17	36	67	−31	39	
18	Jerez Industrial CF (R)	38	10	8	20	37	60	−23	38	Relegation
19	CMD San Juan (R)	38	9	10	19	29	54	−25	37	Relegation
20	CD O'Donnell (R)	38	2	6	30	25	104	−79	12	Relegation

Source: Fútbol Regional
(R) Relegated

=== Group 11 ===
Pos	Team	Pld	W	D	L	GF	GA	GD	Pts	Qualification or relegation
1	CF Sóller	38	25	9	4	94	19	+75	84	Promotion play-offs
2	CD Playas de Calvià	38	24	8	6	84	34	+50	80	Promotion play-offs
3	CD Atlético Baleares	38	23	9	6	77	31	+46	78	Promotion play-offs
4	UD Poblense	38	23	8	7	74	27	+47	77	Promotion play-offs
5	CD Constancia	38	22	10	6	85	31	+54	76	
6	CD Manacor	38	24	3	11	80	37	+43	75	
7	CD Campos	38	22	5	11	75	44	+31	71	
8	Atlètic de Ciutadella	38	19	7	12	64	52	+12	64	
9	CD Ferriolense	38	17	11	10	63	42	+21	62	
10	SCR Peña Deportiva	38	18	5	15	64	49	+15	59	
11	CF Pollença	38	12	9	17	36	54	−18	45	
12	SD Portmany	38	13	5	20	37	69	−32	44	
13	CD Cardassar	38	11	11	16	44	61	−17	44	
14	CF Sporting Mahonés	38	11	11	16	52	54	−2	44	
15	CD Esporlas	38	12	6	20	53	69	−16	42	
16	CD Alayor	38	11	9	18	47	61	−14	42	
17	CD Alaró	38	10	8	20	42	68	−26	38	
18	CD Santanyí (R)	38	4	5	29	29	99	−70	17	Relegation
19	UD Arenal (R)	38	4	4	30	34	113	−79	16	Relegation
20	CD Cala Millor (R)	38	2	3	33	15	135	−120	6	Relegation

Source: Fútbol Regional
(R) Relegated

=== Group 12 ===
Pos	Team	Pld	W	D	L	GF	GA	GD	Pts	Qualification or relegation
1	CD Corralejo	38	27	5	6	81	25	+56	86	Promotion play-offs
2	UD La Pared	38	26	7	5	62	26	+36	85	Promotion play-offs
3	UD Realejos	38	22	10	6	50	24	+26	76	Promotion play-offs
4	UD Las Palmas B	38	21	10	7	78	29	+49	73	Promotion play-offs
5	Atlético Arona	38	21	8	9	76	46	+30	71	
6	CD Maspalomas	38	18	9	11	57	38	+19	63	
7	SD Tenisca	38	17	6	15	71	49	+22	57	
8	CD Victoria	38	15	11	12	52	40	+12	56	
9	UD Orotava	38	18	5	15	59	45	+14	56	
10	UD Telde	38	11	14	13	38	46	−8	47	
11	UD Vecindario	38	12	10	16	47	56	−9	46	
12	CD Arguineguín	38	11	10	17	32	53	−21	43	
13	UD Lanzarote	38	10	11	17	49	61	−12	41	
14	UD Ibarra	38	10	11	17	30	49	−19	41	
15	Estrella CF	38	11	11	16	37	59	−22	41	
16	UD San Antonio	38	9	11	18	47	63	−16	38	
17	Real Artesano FC	38	9	8	21	30	62	−32	35	
18	CD Tablero (R)	38	9	6	23	34	63	−29	33	Relegation
19	UD Icodense (R)	38	8	6	24	38	89	−51	30	Relegation
20	UD Güímar (R)	38	7	7	24	30	75	−45	28	Relegation

Source: Fútbol Regional
(R) Relegated

=== Group 13 ===
Pos	Team	Pld	W	D	L	GF	GA	GD	Pts	Qualification or relegation
1	Real Murcia CF	38	28	7	3	101	21	+80	91	Promotion play-offs
2	Cartagena FC	38	23	9	6	63	28	+35	78	Promotion play-offs
3	AD Mar Menor	38	23	6	9	62	28	+34	75	Promotion play-offs
4	Águilas CF	38	21	11	6	76	26	+50	74	Promotion play-offs
5	AD Cotillas CF	38	19	14	5	49	19	+30	71	
6	AD Relesa Las Palas	38	19	6	13	69	43	+26	63	
7	Pinatar CF	38	16	11	11	53	43	+10	59	
8	Caravaca CF	38	17	6	15	50	52	−2	57	
9	CF Cutillas Fortuna	38	14	14	10	42	36	+6	56	
10	CF Santomera	38	16	7	15	45	53	−8	55	
11	CD Los Garres	38	13	11	14	45	50	−5	50	
12	CD Torre Pacheco	38	13	9	16	46	62	−16	48	
13	CD Beniel	38	11	11	16	39	46	−7	44	
14	Jumilla CF	38	10	13	15	43	47	−4	43	
15	Abarán CF	38	12	6	20	42	62	−20	42	
16	Club Olímpico de Totana	38	9	9	20	32	56	−24	36	
17	Cehegín CF	38	9	8	21	46	80	−34	35	
18	CD Cieza (R)	38	9	5	24	33	70	−37	32	Relegation
19	CD Roldán (R)	38	6	8	24	29	74	−45	26	Relegation
20	Muleño CF (R)	38	4	5	29	29	98	−69	17	Relegation

Source: Fútbol Regional
(R) Relegated

=== Group 14 ===
Pos	Team	Pld	W	D	L	GF	GA	GD	Pts	Qualification or relegation
1	CP Cacereño	38	30	3	5	131	27	+104	93	Promotion play-offs
2	Jerez CF	38	29	6	3	124	22	+102	93	Promotion play-offs
3	Moralo CP	38	24	7	7	75	31	+44	79	Promotion play-offs
4	UD Mérida Promesas	38	22	11	5	72	27	+45	77	Promotion play-offs
5	UP Plasencia	38	21	7	10	80	34	+46	70	
6	SP Villafranca	38	18	11	9	52	33	+19	65	
7	CD Don Benito	38	18	8	12	52	37	+15	62	
8	CD Santa Amalia	38	15	9	14	50	51	−1	54	
9	CD Guadiana	38	13	12	13	47	59	−12	51	
10	CD Grabasa Burguillos	38	14	7	17	48	58	−10	49	
11	UC La Estrella	38	14	7	17	45	62	−17	49	
12	CD Badajoz B	38	12	12	14	39	42	−3	48	
13	Olivenza CP	38	13	8	17	47	64	−17	47	
14	CD Coria	38	12	9	17	33	49	−16	45	
15	UD Fregenal	38	13	3	22	49	67	−18	42	
16	CD Castuera	38	9	14	15	43	61	−18	41	
17	CP Guereña	38	7	12	19	26	64	−38	33	
18	Sanvicenteño FC (R)	38	6	8	24	27	94	−67	26	Relegation
19	UD Fornacense (R)	38	6	3	29	26	97	−71	21	Relegation
20	CD Azuaga (R)	38	3	5	30	23	110	−87	14	Relegation

Source: Fútbol Regional
(R) Relegated

=== Group 15 ===
Pos	Team	Pld	W	D	L	GF	GA	GD	Pts	Qualification or relegation
1	CD Calahorra	38	26	6	6	96	31	+65	84	Promotion play-offs
2	CD Oberena	38	21	12	5	57	29	+28	75	Promotion play-offs
3	Peña Sport FC	38	20	10	8	46	24	+22	70	Promotion play-offs
4	CD Ribaforada	38	22	4	12	67	47	+20	70	Promotion play-offs
5	UCD Burladés	38	20	10	8	56	39	+17	70	
6	CD Alfaro	38	19	10	9	68	45	+23	67	
7	UDC Chantrea	38	20	6	12	82	50	+32	66	
8	CD Azkoyen	38	16	12	10	67	47	+20	60	
9	CD Egüés	38	16	9	13	58	51	+7	57	
10	Atlético Artajonés	38	14	12	12	62	49	+13	54	
11	CD Beti Onak	38	14	7	17	49	53	−4	49	
12	AD Noáin	38	12	9	17	41	58	−17	45	
13	CD Baztán	38	12	9	17	53	65	−12	45	
14	CA River Ebro	38	11	10	17	39	54	−15	43	
15	CD Cortes	38	10	12	16	47	71	−24	42	
16	CD Varea	38	10	9	19	54	69	−15	39	
17	AD San Juan	38	9	12	17	41	54	−13	39	
18	Yagüe CF (R)	38	9	8	21	39	70	−31	35	Relegation
19	SD Lagunak (R)	38	5	8	25	22	72	−50	23	Relegation
20	CD La Calzada (R)	38	3	7	28	32	98	−66	16	Relegation

Source: Fútbol Regional
(R) Relegated

=== Group 16 ===
Pos	Team	Pld	W	D	L	GF	GA	GD	Pts	Qualification or relegation
1	Real Zaragoza B	38	24	8	6	65	22	+43	80	Promotion play-offs
2	Utebo FC	38	22	11	5	69	25	+44	77	Promotion play-offs
3	UD Casetas	38	21	6	11	93	44	+49	69	Promotion play-offs
4	UD Barbastro	38	18	12	8	59	39	+20	66	Promotion play-offs
5	CD Teruel	38	19	9	10	72	34	+38	66	
6	UD Fraga	38	19	9	10	71	34	+37	66	
7	CD Sariñena	38	18	9	11	67	49	+18	63	
8	CF Figueruelas	38	17	11	10	58	53	+5	62	
9	SD Ejea	38	16	11	11	52	44	+8	59	
10	Atlético Monzalbarba	38	16	9	13	58	49	+9	57	
11	Alcañiz CF	38	15	10	13	63	56	+7	55	
12	CD Binéfar	38	16	4	18	61	65	−4	52	
13	CF Illueca	38	12	11	15	43	54	−11	47	
14	CJD Peralta	38	13	8	17	55	54	+1	47	
15	CF Lalueza	38	11	10	17	47	57	−10	43	
16	CD Utrillas	38	12	5	21	43	76	−33	41	
17	CD La Almunia	38	11	5	22	54	89	−35	38	
18	CF Hernán Cortés (R)	38	8	5	25	37	81	−44	29	Relegation
19	CD Caspe (R)	38	8	4	26	31	98	−67	28	Relegation
20	CJD Tamarite (R)	38	4	3	31	27	102	−75	15	Relegation

Source: Fútbol Regional
(R) Relegated

=== Group 17 ===
Pos	Team	Pld	W	D	L	GF	GA	GD	Pts	Qualification or relegation
1	Tomelloso CF	38	26	12	0	84	21	+63	90	Promotion play-offs
2	CD Manchego	38	24	10	4	66	17	+49	82	Promotion play-offs
3	Puertollano Industrial CF	38	22	10	6	82	36	+46	76	Promotion play-offs
4	Manzanares CF	38	21	7	10	61	34	+27	70	Promotion play-offs
5	Hellín Deportivo	38	20	8	10	62	33	+29	68	
6	CP Villarrobledo	38	17	11	10	44	31	+13	62	
7	CF Valdepeñas	38	16	8	14	34	38	−4	56	
8	UB Conquense	38	16	7	15	55	42	+13	55	
9	CD Guadalajara	38	16	6	16	49	49	0	54	
10	CD Mavisa Villacañas	38	15	8	15	47	48	−1	53	
11	CD Torrijos	38	11	15	12	36	39	−3	48	
12	CD Azuqueca	38	10	14	14	41	53	−12	44	
13	CF Gimnástico Alcázar	38	11	11	16	36	46	−10	44	
14	CF La Solana	38	10	12	16	38	46	−8	42	
15	AD Campillo	38	11	8	19	31	52	−21	41	
16	Almagro CF	38	10	8	20	27	60	−33	38	
17	Atlético Teresiano	38	11	4	23	47	85	−38	37	
18	UD Santa Bárbara (R)	38	10	5	23	39	65	−26	35	Relegation
19	Daimiel CF (R)	38	8	8	22	33	69	−36	32	Relegation
20	CD Piedrabuena (R)	38	6	6	26	28	76	−48	24	Relegation

Source: Fútbol Regional
(R) Relegated

== Playoffs ==
- 1995–96 Segunda División B Play-Off
