= CD Benavente =

Association football club in Spain

Benavente
- Full name: Club Deportivo Benavente
- Nickname: Tomateros
- Founded: 1948
- Ground: Luciano Rubio, Benavente, Zamora, Castile and León, Spain
- Capacity: 3,500
- Chairman: Pedro Gallego
- Manager: Santi Redondo
- League: Primera Regional – Group B
- 2024–25: Primera Regional – Group B, 11th of 16
- Website: https://cdbenavente.com/
Home colours	Away colours

Club Deportivo Benavente is a Spanish football club based in Benavente, in the autonomous community of Castile and León. Founded 1948, they play in Primera Regional – Group B, holding home games at Estadio Luciano Rubio, with a capacity of 3,500 people.

== Season to season ==
Season	Tier	Division	Place	Copa del Rey
1947–1957	—	Regional	—	
1957–58	3	3ª	12th	
1958–59	3	3ª	16th	
1959–60	4	1ª Reg.		
1960–61	4	1ª Reg.		
1961–62	4	1ª Reg.	5th	
1962–63	4	1ª Reg.	8th	
1963–64	4	1ª Reg.		
1964–65	4	1ª Reg.	2nd	
1965–66	4	1ª Reg.	2nd	
1966–67	4	1ª Reg.		
1967–68	4	1ª Reg.		
1968–69	4	1ª Reg.	2nd	
1969–70	4	1ª Reg.	1st	
1970–71	4	Reg. Pref.	7th	
1971–72	4	Reg. Pref.	5th	
1972–73	4	Reg. Pref.	13th	
1973–74	4	Reg. Pref.	9th	
1974–75	4	Reg. Pref.	14th	
1975–76	4	Reg. Pref.	10th	

Season	Tier	Division	Place	Copa del Rey
1976–77	4	Reg. Pref.	12th	
1977–78	5	Reg. Pref.	5th	
1978–79	5	Reg. Pref.	2nd	
1979–80	4	3ª	18th	First round
1980–81	4	3ª	11th	
1981–82	4	3ª	16th	
1982–83	4	3ª	18th	
1983–84	5	Reg. Pref.	9th	
1984–85	5	Reg. Pref.	2nd	
1985–86	5	Reg. Pref.	1st	
1986–87	4	3ª	16th	
1987–88	4	3ª	16th	
1988–89	4	3ª	12th	
1989–90	4	3ª	15th	
1990–91	4	3ª	18th	
1991–92	5	Reg. Pref.	7th	
1992–93	5	Reg. Pref.	4th	
1993–94	5	Reg. Pref.	12th	
1994–95	5	Reg. Pref.	1st	
1995–96	4	3ª	20th	

Season	Tier	Division	Place	Copa del Rey
1996–97	5	Reg. Pref.	3rd	
1997–98	5	Reg. Pref.	1st	
1998–99	4	3ª	15th	
1999–2000	4	3ª	11th	
2000–01	4	3ª	9th	
2001–02	4	3ª	11th	
2002–03	4	3ª	14th	
2003–04	4	3ª	12th	
2004–05	4	3ª	14th	
2005–06	4	3ª	17th	
2006–07	4	3ª	19th	
2007–08	5	1ª Reg.	3rd	
2008–09	5	1ª Reg.	10th	
2009–10	5	1ª Reg.	2nd	
2010–11	5	1ª Reg.	11th	
2011–12	5	1ª Reg.	15th	
2012–13	6	1ª Prov.	1st	
2013–14	5	1ª Reg.	17th	
2014–15	6	1ª Prov.	4th	
2015–16	6	1ª Prov.	1st	

Season	Tier	Division	Place	Copa del Rey
2016–17	5	1ª Reg.	16th	
2017–18	6	1ª Prov.	1st	
2018–19	5	1ª Reg.	9th	
2019–20	5	1ª Reg.	14th	
2020–21	5	1ª Reg.	8th	
2021–22	6	1ª Reg.	7th	
2022–23	6	1ª Reg.	12th	
2023–24	6	1ª Reg.	12th	
2024–25	6	1ª Reg.	11th	
2025–26	6	1ª Reg.		

- 21 season in Tercera División
