= 1990–91 Tercera División =

Tercera División
- Season: 1990–91

The 1990–91 season season is the 14th season since the establishment of the tier four. There were 17 groups of 20 teams each. The top four teams in each group played in the Segunda División B play-off, while the last four teams in each group were relegated to Divisiones Regionales de Fútbol.

== Classification ==
=== Group I ===
Pos	Team	Pld	W	D	L	GF	GA	GD	Pts	Qualification or relegation
1	CD Lalín	38	25	9	4	81	23	+58	59	Play-off for promotion
2	Bergantiños FC	38	21	13	4	61	29	+32	55	Play-off for promotion
3	SD Burela	38	19	13	6	58	22	+36	51	Play-off for promotion
4	Fabril Deportivo	38	21	9	8	76	36	+40	51	Play-off for promotion
5	Racing de Ferrol	38	19	11	8	62	34	+28	49	
6	Celta Turista CF	38	16	15	7	48	32	+16	47	
7	Villalonga CF	38	13	17	8	53	47	+6	43	
8	Vivero CF	38	15	12	11	45	46	−1	42	
9	Gran Peña FC	38	14	11	13	53	55	−2	39	
10	CD O Carballiño	38	10	15	13	41	42	−1	35	
11	Arosa SC	38	10	14	14	34	47	−13	34	
12	CD Barco	38	12	8	18	41	48	−7	32	
13	Órdenes CF	38	8	16	14	36	46	−10	32	
14	Club Lemos	38	9	13	16	34	49	−15	31	
15	Brigantium CF	38	10	11	17	38	58	−20	31	
16	Alondras CF	38	8	13	17	38	56	−18	29	
17	Meirás CF	38	8	11	19	28	63	−35	27	
18	Gondomar CF	38	10	6	22	28	58	−30	26	
19	SD Sporting Sada	38	8	8	22	37	67	−30	24	Direct relegation
20	CD Boiro	38	6	11	21	29	63	−34	23	Direct relegation

=== Group II ===
Pos	Team	Pld	W	D	L	GF	GA	GD	Pts	Qualification or relegation
1	Caudal Deportivo	38	21	13	4	62	24	+38	55	Play-off for promotion
2	Club Hispano	38	22	11	5	56	26	+30	55	Play-off for promotion
3	CD Mosconia	38	21	10	7	61	33	+28	52	Play-off for promotion
4	Pumarín CF	38	18	10	10	50	33	+17	46	Play-off for promotion
5	CD Praviano	38	16	13	9	45	38	+7	45	
6	Marino de Luanco	38	14	14	10	54	45	+9	42	
7	Santiago de Aller CF	38	17	8	13	42	35	+7	42	
8	CD Turón	38	16	7	15	48	39	+9	39	
9	Real Titánico	38	15	9	14	51	45	+6	39	
10	CD Lealtad	38	15	6	17	39	42	−3	36	
11	Navia CF	38	13	10	15	43	48	−5	36	
12	UD Gijón Industrial	38	11	13	14	48	49	−1	35	
13	Universidad de Oviedo	38	10	14	14	36	53	−17	34	
14	Candás CF	38	12	10	16	41	43	−2	34	
15	Ribadesella CF	38	10	13	15	37	47	−10	33	
16	Club Siero	38	9	15	14	32	45	−13	33	
18	Deportiva Piloñesa	38	12	9	17	47	55	−8	33	Direct relegation
18	Europa de Nava	38	9	14	15	39	46	−7	32	Direct relegation
19	Asturias de Blimea	38	8	8	22	28	60	−32	24	Direct relegation
20	Luarca CF	38	3	9	26	21	74	−53	15	Direct relegation

=== Group III ===
Pos	Team	Pld	W	D	L	GF	GA	GD	Pts	Qualification or relegation
1	CD Pontejos	38	23	10	5	54	24	+30	56	Play-off for promotion
2	CD Laredo	38	24	8	6	78	24	+54	56	Play-off for promotion
3	CD Barquereño	38	19	15	4	53	16	+37	53	Play-off for promotion
4	UM Escobedo	38	20	12	6	64	27	+37	52	Play-off for promotion
5	Rayo Cantabria	38	19	9	10	73	41	+32	47	
6	Selaya CF	38	16	14	8	43	36	+7	46	
7	Castro CF	38	15	15	8	47	28	+19	45	
8	Marina Cudeyo CF	38	16	13	9	47	24	+23	45	
9	Santoña CF	38	12	18	8	48	35	+13	42	
10	CD Comillas	38	12	16	10	48	40	+8	40	
11	CD Naval	38	14	12	12	50	43	+7	40	
12	SD Barreda Balompié	38	13	13	12	41	41	0	39	
13	CD Cayón	38	11	9	18	37	53	−16	31	
14	CD Ramales	38	8	14	16	36	52	−16	30	
15	CF Ribamontán al Mar	38	10	9	19	31	51	−20	29	
16	Vimenor CF	38	8	12	18	30	54	−24	28	
17	CD Colindres	38	9	9	20	27	52	−25	27	
18	SD Noja	38	8	9	21	33	67	−34	25	Direct relegation
19	Ayrón CF	38	5	10	23	27	75	−48	20	Direct relegation
20	SD Reocín	38	1	7	30	13	97	−84	9	Direct relegation

=== Group IV ===
Pos	Team	Pld	W	D	L	GF	GA	GD	Pts	Qualification or relegation
1	CD Hernani	38	20	10	8	58	40	+18	50	Play-off for promotion
2	CD Elgoibar	38	19	10	9	50	32	+18	48	Play-off for promotion
3	Tolosa CF	38	18	11	9	53	29	+24	47	Play-off for promotion
4	SD Amorebieta	38	18	11	9	51	36	+15	47	Play-off for promotion
5	CD Munguía	38	16	13	9	50	34	+16	45	
6	CD Getxo	38	12	18	8	35	28	+7	42	
7	CD Aurrerá Ondarroa	38	14	12	12	42	37	+5	40	
8	CD Galdakao	38	13	12	13	43	47	−4	38	
9	Zalla UC	38	15	7	16	41	42	−1	37	
10	Arenas Club de Getxo	38	12	13	13	28	37	−9	37	
11	Mondragón CF	38	12	13	13	36	32	+4	37	
12	Club Bermeo	38	16	4	18	41	46	−5	36	
13	SD Gernika Club	38	12	12	14	37	46	−9	36	
14	Sodupe UC	38	10	16	12	34	38	−4	36	
15	CD Pasajes	38	9	17	12	22	37	−15	35	
16	Real Unión	38	10	14	14	34	40	−6	34	
17	CD Aurrerá de Vitoria	38	12	9	17	42	46	−4	33	Direct relegation
18	CD Touring	38	9	12	17	27	37	−10	30	Direct relegation
19	CD Zarauz	38	9	8	21	30	47	−17	26	Direct relegation
20	CD Larramendi	38	5	16	17	33	56	−23	26	Direct relegation

=== Group V ===
Pos	Team	Pld	W	D	L	GF	GA	GD	Pts	Qualification or relegation
1	CF Balaguer	38	22	6	10	60	39	+21	50	Play-off for promotion
2	Club Gimnàstic	38	20	8	10	66	40	+26	48	Play-off for promotion
3	CE Banyoles	38	17	12	9	57	39	+18	46	Play-off for promotion
4	CA Roda de Barà	38	18	10	10	51	38	+13	46	Play-off for promotion
5	Vilobí CF	38	19	7	12	49	37	+12	45	
6	FC Martinenc	38	14	16	8	61	42	+19	44	
7	CD Blanes	38	16	12	10	42	39	+3	44	
8	FC Barcelona Aficio.	38	16	11	11	68	53	+15	43	
9	CD Tortosa	38	15	11	12	52	46	+6	41	
10	FC Cristinenc	38	15	10	13	58	52	+6	40	
11	UDA Gramenet	38	17	5	16	54	47	+7	39	
12	CD Júpiter	38	11	13	14	50	56	−6	35	
13	CD Europa	38	12	10	16	48	55	−7	34	
14	Sant Cugat CE	38	11	12	15	50	55	−5	34	
15	Olot UE	38	12	10	16	49	59	−10	34	
16	CF Igualada	38	12	8	18	66	73	−7	32	
17	UA Horta	38	11	9	18	38	54	−16	31	
18	Lloret CF	38	9	13	16	39	58	−19	31	Direct relegation
19	CF Reus Deportiu	38	10	9	19	45	52	−7	29	Direct relegation
20	UD Esplugues	38	3	8	27	22	91	−69	14	Direct relegation

=== Group VI Norte ===
Pos	Team	Pld	W	D	L	GF	GA	GD	Pts	Qualification or relegation
1	SD Sueca	34	20	9	5	59	23	+36	49	Play-off for promotion
2	Villarreal CF	34	17	14	3	57	26	+31	48	Play-off for promotion
3	CD Burriana	34	18	10	6	43	24	+19	46	
4	CD Mestalla	34	16	12	6	52	20	+32	44	
5	CD Alzamora	34	15	14	5	40	25	+15	44	
6	CF Llíria	34	16	7	11	44	36	+8	39	
7	Vinaròs CF	34	15	7	12	37	32	+5	37	
8	CD Betxí	34	14	8	12	37	36	+1	36	
9	CF Cullera	34	12	9	13	33	38	−5	33	
10	CD Acero	34	12	8	14	38	36	+2	32	
11	Paiporta CF	34	9	11	14	35	43	−8	29	
12	Atlético Saguntino	34	8	12	14	30	46	−16	28	
13	UD Vall de Uxó	34	9	10	15	28	44	−16	28	
14	CD Onda	34	10	8	16	34	43	−9	28	
15	CD Alacuás	34	8	11	15	22	40	−18	27	
16	Ribarroja CF	34	9	8	17	31	49	−18	26	
17	Alboraya UD	34	5	12	17	22	45	−23	22	Direct relegation
18	Nules CF	34	4	8	22	28	64	−36	16	Direct relegation

=== Group VI Sur ===
Pos	Team	Pld	W	D	L	GF	GA	GD	Pts	Qualification or relegation
1	UD Oliva	34	20	10	4	61	26	+35	50	Play-off for promotion
2	CD Denia	34	17	14	3	33	11	+22	48	Play-off for promotion
3	CD Jávea	34	17	13	4	47	24	+23	47	
4	Onteniente CF	34	17	12	5	55	24	+31	46	
5	CD Ilicitano	34	14	11	9	61	31	+30	39	
6	Pinoso CF	34	13	12	9	36	25	+11	38	
7	CD Ollería	34	13	12	9	32	26	+6	38	
8	SD Villajoyosa	34	12	14	8	43	35	+8	38	
9	Alicante CF	34	11	11	12	48	40	+8	33	
10	UD Horadada	34	12	8	14	37	40	−3	32	
11	Albatera CF	34	8	14	12	29	41	−12	30	
12	UD Canals	34	6	17	11	29	42	−13	29	
13	Monóvar CD	34	10	8	16	41	50	−9	28	
14	UD Carcaixent	34	9	10	15	39	55	−16	28	
15	Pego CF	34	9	9	16	27	38	−11	27	
16	UD Aspense	34	7	10	17	26	49	−23	24	
17	Algemesí CF	34	7	9	18	26	52	−26	23	Direct relegation
18	CD Dolores	34	3	8	23	15	76	−61	14	Direct relegation

=== Group VII ===
Pos	Team	Pld	W	D	L	GF	GA	GD	Pts	Qualification or relegation
1	Real Madrid C	38	25	9	4	78	29	+49	59	Play-off for promotion
2	CF Fuenlabrada	38	22	5	11	67	40	+27	49	Play-off for promotion
3	Atlético Valdemoro	38	17	12	9	55	48	+7	46	Play-off for promotion
4	AD Parla	38	20	5	13	50	37	+13	45	Play-off for promotion
5	AD Torrejón	38	18	9	11	52	47	+5	45	
6	Rayo Vallecano B	38	15	13	10	57	42	+15	43	
7	CD Colonia Moscardó	38	17	8	13	53	44	+9	42	
8	CD Vicálvaro	38	17	8	13	51	42	+9	42	
9	Aranjuez CF	38	15	10	13	58	45	+13	40	
10	AD Alcobendas	38	14	10	14	52	50	+2	38	
11	CF Rayo Majadahonda	38	14	8	16	42	46	−4	36	
12	UD SS de los Reyes	38	14	8	16	40	46	−6	36	
13	CDA Navalcarnero	38	14	8	16	53	62	−9	36	
14	CD Carabanchel	38	12	12	14	54	53	+1	36	
15	AD Colmenar Viejo	38	10	12	16	36	59	−23	32	
16	CD Cubas	38	11	10	17	56	57	−1	32	Direct relegation
17	DAV Santa Ana	38	10	10	18	39	53	−14	30	Direct relegation
18	Vallecas CF	38	10	9	19	32	60	−28	29	Direct relegation
19	AD Alcorcón	38	7	9	22	36	66	−30	23	Direct relegation
20	AD El Pardo	38	6	9	23	45	80	−35	21	Direct relegation

=== Group VIII ===
Pos	Team	Pld	W	D	L	GF	GA	GD	Pts	Qualification or relegation
1	Valladolid Promesas	38	27	5	6	97	28	+69	59	Play-off for promotion
2	Zamora CF	38	24	8	6	79	25	+54	56	Play-off for promotion
3	SD Almazán	38	19	10	9	58	40	+18	48	Play-off for promotion
4	Atlético Burgalés	38	21	4	13	52	37	+15	46	Play-off for promotion
5	Racing Lermeño CF	38	17	10	11	66	45	+21	44	
6	SD Hullera VL	38	18	8	12	56	44	+12	44	
7	Whisky Dyc	38	15	13	10	57	36	+21	43	
8	Gimnástica Medinense	38	15	13	10	47	36	+11	43	
9	Atlético Astorga FC	38	18	6	14	54	43	+11	42	
10	CD Salmantino	38	17	7	14	59	45	+14	41	
11	La Bañeza FC	38	12	15	11	48	50	−2	39	
12	CF Endesa Ponferrada	38	11	15	12	47	42	+5	37	
13	Arandina CF	38	12	11	15	45	53	−8	35	
14	Gimnástica Segoviana	38	10	12	16	51	68	−17	32	
15	SD Fabero	38	11	10	17	44	61	−17	32	
16	CA Bembibre	38	10	11	17	42	58	−16	31	
17	CF Briviesca	38	10	10	18	37	57	−20	30	
18	CD Benavente	38	9	11	18	41	69	−28	29	Direct relegation
19	Real Monterrey CF	38	6	5	27	38	103	−65	17	Direct relegation
20	CD Aguilar	38	3	6	29	30	108	−78	12	Direct relegation

=== Group IX ===
Pos	Team	Pld	W	D	L	GF	GA	GD	Pts	Qualification or relegation
1	CA Marbella	38	25	12	1	66	11	+55	62	Play-off for promotion
2	Polideportivo Ejido	38	17	16	5	45	29	+16	50	Play-off for promotion
3	CD Mármol Macael	38	20	9	9	65	29	+36	49	Play-off for promotion
4	Real Jaén CF	38	21	7	10	54	35	+19	49	Play-off for promotion
5	Motril CF	38	17	12	9	64	39	+25	46	
6	Atlético Malagueño	38	16	11	11	56	37	+19	43	
7	Iliturgi CF	38	17	8	13	48	39	+9	42	
8	Martos CD	38	14	12	12	55	45	+10	40	
9	Guadix CF	38	13	14	11	39	37	+2	40	
10	UD Maracena	38	14	11	13	47	35	+12	39	
11	Úbeda CF	38	13	13	12	49	44	+5	39	
12	Vélez CF	38	13	12	13	44	49	−5	38	
13	Polideportivo Almería	38	13	11	14	45	44	+1	37	
14	Baeza CF	38	13	8	17	43	51	−8	34	
15	Melilla FC	38	13	8	17	35	56	−21	34	
16	CD Nerja	38	13	6	19	39	49	−10	32	
17	CD Ronda	38	7	15	16	34	51	−17	29	
18	CD Mijas	38	8	8	22	29	72	−43	24	
19	CD Antequerano	38	4	9	25	26	64	−38	17	Direct relegation
20	Atlético Benamiel	38	5	6	27	17	84	−67	16	Direct relegation

=== Group X ===
Pos	Team	Pld	W	D	L	GF	GA	GD	Pts	Qualification or relegation
1	Cádiz CF B	38	21	11	6	70	34	+36	53	Play-off for promotion
2	Racing Club Portuense	38	21	8	9	59	35	+24	50	Play-off for promotion
3	Écija Balompié	38	22	6	10	49	25	+24	50	Play-off for promotion
4	CD San Roque de Lepe	38	20	9	9	54	30	+24	49	Play-off for promotion
5	CD Pozoblanco	38	17	15	6	48	33	+15	49	
6	Atlético Palma del Río	38	19	9	10	45	29	+16	47	
7	Algeciras CF	38	17	11	10	57	41	+16	45	
8	Chiclana CF	38	16	11	11	46	40	+6	43	
9	CD Mairena	38	13	16	9	36	31	+5	42	
10	Montilla CF	38	14	13	11	37	31	+6	41	
11	CD San Fernando	38	14	9	15	45	48	−3	37	
12	CD Lebrija	38	11	11	16	47	50	−3	33	
13	Coria CF	38	13	7	18	45	50	−5	33	
14	CA Lucentino Industrial	38	10	12	16	39	52	−13	32	
15	Santaella CF	38	11	9	18	37	62	−25	31	
16	Jerez Industrial CF	38	10	9	19	37	43	−6	29	
17	La Palma CF	38	7	13	18	30	52	−22	27	Direct relegation
18	Ayamonte CF	38	9	8	21	35	56	−21	26	Direct relegation
19	CD Utrera	38	11	3	24	31	56	−25	25	Direct relegation
20	Puerto Real CF	38	4	10	24	18	67	−49	18	Direct relegation

=== Group XI ===
Pos	Team	Pld	W	D	L	GF	GA	GD	Pts	Qualification or relegation
1	CD Playas de Calvià	38	22	13	3	78	23	+55	57	Play-off for promotion
2	SD Ibiza	38	23	10	5	55	19	+36	56	Play-off for promotion
3	CD Atlético Baleares	38	21	14	3	50	13	+37	56	Play-off for promotion
4	CD Cala D'Or	38	17	14	7	47	35	+12	48	Play-off for promotion
5	CD Alayor	38	14	16	8	47	29	+18	44	
6	CD Cala Millor	38	16	12	10	53	38	+15	44	
7	UD Poblense	38	15	11	12	34	31	+3	41	
8	CD Ferrerías	38	14	13	11	37	36	+1	41	
9	UD Seislán	38	16	9	13	48	39	+9	41	
10	CD Ferriolense	38	14	13	11	53	47	+6	41	
11	CF Sóller	38	11	14	13	28	32	−4	36	
12	SD Portmany	38	12	9	17	43	55	−12	33	
13	UD Arenal	38	11	11	16	49	37	+12	33	
14	Santa Eulàlia	38	11	11	16	34	38	−4	33	
15	CD Cardessar	38	8	16	14	39	46	−7	32	
16	CD Isleño	38	10	11	17	36	62	−26	31	Direct relegation
17	CF San Rafael	38	8	12	18	37	63	−26	28	Direct relegation
18	UD Alaró	38	10	5	23	39	77	−38	25	Direct relegation
19	UE Alcúdia	38	8	6	24	32	71	−39	22	Direct relegation
20	CF Hospitalet LB	38	4	10	24	26	74	−48	18	Direct relegation

=== Group XII ===
Pos	Team	Pld	W	D	L	GF	GA	GD	Pts	Qualification or relegation
1	UD Realejos	38	24	9	5	70	17	+53	57	Play-off for promotion
2	CD Mensajero	38	22	8	8	49	21	+28	52	Play-off for promotion
3	CD Corralejo	38	21	6	11	63	36	+27	48	Play-off for promotion
4	CD Maspalomas	38	20	7	11	73	43	+30	47	Play-off for promotion
5	AD Laguna	38	19	8	11	74	41	+33	46	
6	Ferreras CF	38	17	9	12	65	49	+16	43	
7	CD Arguineguín	38	17	9	12	48	37	+11	43	
8	UD Aridane	38	16	8	14	50	48	+2	40	
9	CD Unión Tejina	38	14	11	13	47	40	+7	39	
10	UD Vecindario	38	14	10	14	35	49	−14	38	
11	SD Tenisca	38	13	12	13	45	46	−1	38	
12	CD I'Gara	38	14	9	15	29	49	−20	37	
13	UD Ibarra	38	13	9	16	53	53	0	35	
14	UD Orotava	38	10	12	16	38	51	−13	32	
15	UD Güimar	38	7	18	13	27	45	−18	32	
16	UD Salud	38	9	13	16	29	45	−16	31	
17	SD Águilas Atlético	38	10	9	19	39	61	−22	29	Direct relegation
18	CD Puerto Cruz	38	8	10	20	26	62	−36	26	Direct relegation
19	Arucas CF	38	7	10	21	30	58	−28	24	Direct relegation
20	UD Las Torres	38	5	13	20	31	70	−39	23	Direct relegation

=== Group XIII ===
Pos	Team	Pld	W	D	L	GF	GA	GD	Pts	Qualification or relegation
1	CD Roldán	38	24	10	4	77	27	+50	58	Play-off for promotion
2	Imperial CF	38	22	12	4	77	24	+53	56	Play-off for promotion
3	AD Mar Menor	38	19	12	7	62	34	+28	50	Play-off for promotion
4	Águilas CF	38	18	13	7	68	31	+37	49	Play-off for promotion
5	CD Algar	38	17	13	8	48	40	+8	47	
6	CF Santomera	38	17	12	9	52	33	+19	46	
7	CD Alberca	38	17	11	10	50	36	+14	45	
8	Fuente Álamo CF	38	16	13	9	54	46	+8	45	
9	CD Cieza Promesas	38	15	10	13	42	42	0	40	
10	AD San Miguel	38	13	14	11	36	37	−1	40	
11	CF Lorca Deportiva	38	13	13	12	36	30	+6	39	
12	Abarán CF	38	13	13	12	45	40	+5	39	
13	Jumilla CF	38	13	12	13	41	38	+3	38	
14	Cehegín CF	38	8	14	16	31	50	−19	30	
15	Olímpico de Totana	38	9	11	18	37	60	−23	29	
16	CD Cieza	38	8	11	19	36	57	−21	27	
17	Barinas CF	38	8	11	19	30	48	−18	27	
18	La Unión Athletic	38	6	13	19	30	63	−33	25	Direct relegation
19	CD Naval	38	6	11	21	33	60	−27	23	Direct relegation
20	CD Torre Pacheco	38	1	5	32	16	105	−89	7	Direct relegation

=== Group XIV ===
Pos	Team	Pld	W	D	L	GF	GA	GD	Pts	Qualification or relegation
1	CD Don Benito	38	26	9	3	82	20	+62	61	Play-off for promotion
2	CP Cacereño	38	24	12	2	72	25	+47	60	Play-off for promotion
3	UP Plasencia	38	21	11	6	67	24	+43	53	Play-off for promotion
4	CD Villanovense	38	19	13	6	65	28	+37	51	Play-off for promotion
5	Club Cristian Lay	38	18	9	11	49	37	+12	45	
6	CD Badajoz Promesas	38	19	7	12	62	45	+17	45	
7	CD Miajadas	38	16	11	11	40	39	+1	43	
8	CD Azuaga	38	17	9	12	49	43	+6	43	
9	UD Montijo	38	17	8	13	53	47	+6	42	
10	Moralo CP	38	14	13	11	53	39	+14	41	
11	SP Villafranca	38	16	7	15	52	43	+9	39	
12	CD Castuera	38	10	12	16	42	61	−19	32	
13	CP Talayuela	38	11	10	17	40	61	−21	32	
14	CD Díter Zafra	38	12	7	19	30	46	−16	31	
15	AD Llerenense	38	8	14	16	35	53	−18	30	
16	CD San Serván	38	11	7	20	54	55	−1	29	
17	UC La Estrella	38	8	10	20	30	59	−29	26	
18	Sanvicenteño FC	38	8	5	25	23	78	−55	21	Direct relegation
19	CD Coria	38	6	9	23	34	84	−50	21	Direct relegation
20	AD Puebla Patria	38	5	5	28	19	64	−45	15	Direct relegation

=== Group XV ===
Pos	Team	Pld	W	D	L	GF	GA	GD	Pts	Qualification or relegation
1	CD Tudelano	38	19	13	6	63	30	+33	51	Play-off for promotion
2	CD Logroñés Promesas	38	18	12	8	53	39	+14	48	Play-off for promotion
3	CD Peña Sport	38	18	12	8	62	40	+22	48	Play-off for promotion
4	CD Alfaro	38	19	10	9	58	37	+21	48	Play-off for promotion
5	UCD Burladés	38	18	11	9	49	38	+11	47	
6	CD Arnedo	38	17	13	8	56	31	+25	47	
7	UDC Chantrea	38	15	16	7	57	40	+17	46	
8	CA Artajonés	38	16	11	11	50	47	+3	43	
9	CD Calahorra	38	14	14	10	56	43	+13	42	
10	CD Berceo	38	14	11	13	42	42	0	39	
11	CD Egüés	38	14	10	14	50	53	−3	38	
12	Haro Deportivo	38	13	11	14	48	50	−2	37	
13	CD San Adrián	38	13	9	16	38	39	−1	35	
14	CD Ribaforada	38	12	10	16	46	50	−4	34	
15	CD Oberena	38	11	10	17	51	58	−7	32	
16	CD River Ebro	38	9	14	15	36	52	−16	32	
17	AD San Juan	38	8	13	17	25	44	−19	29	Direct relegation
18	SD Loyola	38	9	10	19	29	58	−29	28	Direct relegation
19	SD Alsasua	38	6	8	24	35	73	−38	20	Direct relegation
20	AD Noaín	38	5	6	27	19	59	−40	16	Direct relegation

=== Group XVI ===
Pos	Team	Pld	W	D	L	GF	GA	GD	Pts	Qualification or relegation
1	UD Fraga	38	29	7	2	95	29	+66	65	Play-off for promotion
2	UD Barbastro	38	22	11	5	71	22	+49	55	Play-off for promotion
3	AD Sabiñánigo	38	18	12	8	52	32	+20	48	Play-off for promotion
4	CD Calatayud	38	19	9	10	48	38	+10	47	Play-off for promotion
5	Monzón	38	16	14	8	49	34	+15	46	
6	SD Ejea	38	17	11	10	51	35	+16	45	
7	CD Alcorisa	38	15	13	10	52	53	−1	43	
8	CD Caspe	38	16	10	12	53	37	+16	42	
9	CD Utrillas	38	14	13	11	46	39	+7	41	
10	CA Monzalbarba	38	14	8	16	39	52	−13	36	
11	Utebo FC	38	12	10	16	47	53	−6	34	
12	CD Ebro	38	12	10	16	45	56	−11	34	
13	CD Tauste	38	9	16	13	32	46	−14	34	
14	CD Mallén	38	10	13	15	35	41	−6	33	
15	JD Peralta	38	11	11	16	43	53	−10	33	
16	CD Sariñena	38	11	9	18	36	56	−20	31	
17	Alcañiz CF	38	11	8	19	41	49	−8	30	Direct relegation
18	SD Tarazona	38	10	8	20	26	46	−20	28	Direct relegation
19	AD Almudévar	38	5	14	19	36	58	−22	24	Direct relegation
20	UD Biescas	38	2	7	29	19	87	−68	11	Direct relegation

=== Group XVII ===
Pos	Team	Pld	W	D	L	GF	GA	GD	Pts	Qualification or relegation
1	Talavera CF	36	20	11	5	64	28	+36	51	Play-off for promotion
2	CD Guadalajara	36	19	10	7	48	29	+19	48	Play-off for promotion
3	UB Conquense	36	17	11	8	44	25	+19	45	Play-off for promotion
4	UD Socuéllamos	36	16	13	7	51	33	+18	45	Play-off for promotion
5	CF Gimnástico Alcázar	36	17	10	9	49	29	+20	44	
6	CP Villarrobledo	36	12	17	7	40	28	+12	41	
7	CA Albacete	36	13	11	12	38	29	+9	37	
8	AD Tarancón	36	13	11	12	50	60	−10	37	
9	CD Los Yébenes	36	13	11	12	38	33	+5	37	
10	Daimiel CF	36	13	9	14	37	43	−6	35	
11	Motilla CF	36	12	10	14	40	40	0	34	
12	Sporting Quintanar Orden	36	8	18	10	30	36	−6	34	
13	CD Portillo	36	9	15	12	29	32	−3	33	
14	Atlético La Solana	36	13	6	17	54	60	−6	32	
15	Manzanares CF	36	6	15	15	32	58	−26	27	
16	CD Azuqueca	36	9	9	18	35	54	−19	27	
17	CD Madridejos	36	9	9	18	38	48	−10	27	Direct relegation
18	Almagro CF	36	10	7	19	27	50	−23	27	Direct relegation
19	CD Mavisa Villacañas	36	6	11	19	28	57	−29	23	Direct relegation
20	CD Fuensalida	0	0	0	0	0	0	0	0	Direct relegation

== See also ==
- 1990–91 Play-Off
