= CD Fuencarral =

Spanish football club

Fuencarral
- Full name: Club Deportivo Fuencarral
- Founded: 1950
- Dissolved: 2022
- Ground: Estadio Valverde, Madrid, (Madrid, Spain
- Capacity: 900
- Chairman: (Spain) Diego Bermúdez
- 2021–22: Tercera de Aficionados – Group 10, withdrew
Home colours	Away colours

Club Deportivo Fuencarral was a football club based in Madrid in the autonomous community of Community of Madrid. It last played in the Tercera de Aficionados – Group 10. Its stadium is Estadio Valverde with a capacity of 900 seats.

In 1989, Fuencarral promoted to Tercera División after acquiring the spot of AD Maravillas.

== Season to season ==
Season	Tier	Division	Place	Copa del Rey
1950–51	6	2ª Reg.	5th	
1951–52	6	2ª Reg.	2nd	
1952–53	5	2ª Reg. P.	3rd	
1953–54	5	2ª Reg. P.	2nd	
1954–55	5	2ª Reg.	6th	
1955–56	5	2ª Reg.	3rd	
1956–57	5	2ª Reg.	10th	
1957–58	5	2ª Reg.	1st	
1958–59	4	1ª Reg.	3rd	
1959–60	4	1ª Reg.	11th	
1960–61	4	1ª Reg.	7th	
1961–62	4	1ª Reg.	10th	
1962–63	4	1ª Reg.	11th	
1963–64	4	1ª Reg.	10th	
1964–65	4	1ª Reg.	9th	
1965–66	4	1ª Reg.	10th	
1966–67	4	1ª Reg.	14th	
1967–68	4	1ª Reg.	1st	
1968–69	4	1ª Reg.	13th	
1969–70	4	1ª Reg.	13th	

Season	Tier	Division	Place	Copa del Rey
1970–71	5	2ª Reg.	14th	
1971–72	5	2ª Reg.	16th	
1972–73	5	2ª Reg.	15th	
1973–74	6	2ª Reg.	7th	
1974–75	6	2ª Reg.	1st	
1975–76	5	1ª Reg.	17th	
1976–77	6	2ª Reg.	3rd	
1977–78	6	1ª Reg.	10th	
1978–79	6	1ª Reg.	18th	
1979–80	7	2ª Reg.	6th	
1980–81	7	2ª Reg.	4th	
1981–82	7	2ª Reg.	2nd	
1982–83	6	1ª Reg.	3rd	
1983–84	5	Reg. Pref.	14th	
1984–85	5	Reg. Pref.	14th	
1985–86	5	Reg. Pref.	15th	
1986–87	5	Reg. Pref.	11th	
1987–88	5	Reg. Pref.	6th	
1988–89	4	3ª	18th	
1989–90	5	Reg. Pref.	3rd	

Season	Tier	Division	Place	Copa del Rey
1990–91	5	Reg. Pref.	3rd	
1991–92	5	Reg. Pref.	3rd	
1992–93	5	Reg. Pref.	3rd	
1993–94	5	Reg. Pref.	1st	
1994–95	4	3ª	7th	
1995–96	4	3ª	13th	
1996–97	4	3ª	10th	
1997–98	4	3ª	18th	
1998–99	5	Reg. Pref.	17th	
1999–2000	6	1ª Reg.	17th	
2000–01	7	2ª Reg.	1st	
2001–02	6	1ª Reg.	12th	
2002–03	6	1ª Reg.	15th	
2003–04	7	2ª Reg.	12th	
2004–05	7	2ª Reg.	15th	
2005–06	7	2ª Reg.	10th	

Season	Tier	Division	Place	Copa del Rey
2006–07	7	2ª Reg.	8th	
2007–08	7	2ª Reg.	15th	
2008–09	7	2ª Reg.	10th	
2009–10	7	2ª Afic.	11th	
2010–11	7	2ª Afic.	5th	
2011–12	7	2ª Afic.	6th	
2012–13	7	2ª Afic.	14th	
2013–14	7	2ª Afic.	15th	
2014–15	7	2ª Afic.	10th	
2015–16	7	2ª Afic.	17th	
2016–17	8	3ª Afic.	4th	
2017–18	8	3ª Afic.	4th	
2018–19	8	3ª Afic.	12th	
2019–20	8	3ª Afic.	12th	
2020–21	8	3ª Afic.	17th	
2021–22	9	3ª Afic.	(R)	

- 5 seasons in Tercera División
