= Cartagena Atlético =

Spanish football club

- Full name: Cartagena Atlético
- Founded: 1972
- Dissolved: 1998
- Ground: Ciudad Deportiva Gómez Meseguer; Cartagena, Spain
- Capacity: 3,500
- 1997–98: 3ª - Group 13, 20th of 20
| Home colours | Away colours |

Cartagena Atlético was a Spanish football team based in Cartagena, in the Region of Murcia. Founded in 1972 and dissolved in 1998, they played their last season in Tercera División – Group 13, holding home games at Ciudad Deportiva Gómez Meseguer, with a capacity for 3,500 spectators.

== History ==
Founded in 1972 as La Unión Athletic, the club only opened a senior side in 1979, after CD La Unión were dissolved. They first reached the Tercera División in 1987, being immediately relegated back.

In 1995, after the relegation of Cartagena FC to the fourth division, La Unión merged with Efesé Cartagena Deportivo to create Efesé-Unión Club de Fútbol Cartagena. In the following year, the club changed name to Cartagena Atlético, but were dissolved two seasons later; CD La Unión subsequently returned to action in 2000.

=== Club background ===
- La Unión Athletic — (1976–95)
- Efesé-Unión Club de Fútbol Cartagena — (1995–96)
- Cartagena Atlético — (1996–98)

== Season to season ==
| Season | Tier | Division | Place | Copa del Rey |
|---|---|---|---|---|
| 1979–80 | 7 | 2ª Reg. | 8th | |
| 1980–81 | 7 | 2ª Reg. | 5th | |
| 1981–82 | 7 | 2ª Reg. | 4th | |
| 1982–83 | 7 | 2ª Reg. | 1st | |
| 1983–84 | 6 | 1ª Reg. | 9th | |
| 1984–85 | 6 | 1ª Reg. | 10th | |
| 1985–86 | 6 | 1ª Reg. | 1st | |
| 1986–87 | 5 | Reg. Pref. | 1st | |
| 1987–88 | 4 | 3ª | 20th | |
| 1988–89 | 5 | Reg. Pref. | 3rd | |

| Season | Tier | Division | Place | Copa del Rey |
|---|---|---|---|---|
| 1989–90 | 4 | 3ª | 16th | |
| 1990–91 | 4 | 3ª | 18th | |
| 1991–92 | 5 | Reg. Pref. | 12th | |
| 1992–93 | 5 | Reg. Pref. | 8th | |
| 1993–94 | 5 | Reg. Pref. | 11th | |
| 1994–95 | 5 | Reg. Pref. | 8th | |
| 1995–96 | 5 | Reg. Pref. | 6th | |
| 1996–97 | 5 | Reg. Pref. | 3rd | |
| 1997–98 | 4 | 3ª | 20th | |

- 4 seasons in Tercera División
