= CF Fuenlabrada B =

Association football club in Spain

Fuenlabrada B
- Full name: Club de Fútbol Fuenlabrada B
- Founded: 1991
- Dissolved: 2025
- Ground: La Aldehuela, Fuenlabrada, Madrid, Spain
- Capacity: 2,000
- President: Jonathan Praena
- Head coach: Manu Espinar
- 2024–25: Segunda de Aficionados – Group 10, 11th of 16
- Website: cffuenlabrada.es
Home colours	Away colours	Third colours

Club de Fútbol Fuenlabrada B was a Spanish football team based in Fuenlabrada, in the autonomous Community of Madrid. The second reserve team of CF Fuenlabrada, it was founded in 1991, and held home matches at Campo Municipal La Aldehuela.

== History ==
The club was founded in the 1991 as Agrupación Deportiva Las Ruedas Fuenlabrada and acquired a place in Primera Regional Madrileña. It was renamed Club de Fútbol Naranjo Fuenlabrada in the following year before changing to Club de Fútbol Fuenlabrada B in 1996, but ceased activities in 2004.

Fuenlabrada B returned to an active status only in 2015, being registered in the Tercera de Aficionados, the lowest regional league of the Community of Madrid and eighth tier of Spanish football. The club achieved three back-to-back promotions straight to Preferente de Madrid, being relegated in their first season but immediately bouncing back.

On 6 July 2021, after Fuenlabrada bought out the place of Flat Earth FC, the latter club was renamed CF Fuenlabrada Promesas Madrid 2021 and took their place in Tercera División RFEF, while Fuenlabrada B became the second reserve team and remained in the Preferente category.

== Season to season ==
Season	Tier	Division	Place
1991–92	6	1ª Reg.	5th
1992–93	6	1ª Reg.	1st
1993–94	5	Reg. Pref.	10th
1994–95	5	Reg. Pref.	12th
1995–96	5	Reg. Pref.	7th
1996–97	5	Reg. Pref.	7th
1997–98	5	Reg. Pref.	8th
1998–99	5	Reg. Pref.	5th
1999–2000	5	Reg. Pref.	5th
2000–01	5	Reg. Pref.	12th
2001–02	5	Reg. Pref.	4th
2002–03	5	Reg. Pref.	12th

Season	Tier	Division	Place
2003–04	5	Reg. Pref.	15th
2004–2015	DNP		
2015–16	8	3ª Afic.	1st
2016–17	7	2ª Afic.	1st
2017–18	6	1ª Afic.	2nd
2018–19	5	Pref.	17th
2019–20	6	1ª Afic.	1st
2020–21	5	Pref.	4th
2021–22	6	Pref.	15th
2022–23	7	1ª Afic.	17th
2023–24	8	2ª Afic.	17th
2024–25	9	2ª Afic.	11th

== Notable players ==
- (Equatorial Guinea) Marvin Anieboh
- (Spain) Rubén Anuarbe
- (Spain) Guti
- (Spain) Raúl Moreno
- (Spain) Luis Peteiro
- (Spain) Álvaro Ruvira

== See also ==
- CF Fuenlabrada
