= CD Ribaforada =

Spanish sports club

Ribaforada
- Full name: Club Deportivo Ribaforada
- Nickname: Rojillos (Reds)
- Founded: 3 February 1921; 105 years ago as Club Deportivo Imperio
- Ground: San Bartolomé, Ribaforada
- Capacity: 2,000
- Chairman: (Spain) Míchel Fernández
- Manager: (Spain) Javier Serrano
- League: Primera Regional – Group 1
- 2024–25: Primera Regional – Group 1, 8th of 17
- Website: http://www.cdribaforada.com
| Home colours | Away colours | Third colours |

Club Deportivo Ribaforada is a sports club based in Ribaforada (Navarre, Spain). It was founded as a football club, named Club Deportivo Imperio, in 1921. It is the third oldest team of Navarre. It plays in the category Primera Regional – Group 1. The highest category is that it has reached the Tercera División. It played in the Campo de Fútbol San Bartolomé. Its reserve team is CDM Ribaforada.

== Season to season ==
| Season | Tier | Division | Place | Copa del Rey |
|---|---|---|---|---|
| 1948–49 | 5 | 2ª Reg. | 2nd | |
| 1949–50 | 5 | 2ª Reg. | 5th | |
| 1950–1957 | DNP | | | |
| 1957–58 | 5 | 2ª Reg. | 3rd | |
| 1958–1964 | DNP | | | |
| 1964–65 | 5 | 2ª Reg. | 5th | |
| 1965–66 | DNP | | | |
| 1966–67 | DNP | | | |
| 1967–68 | 5 | 2ª Reg. | 1st | |
| 1968–69 | 5 | 2ª Reg. | 9th | |
| 1969–70 | 5 | 2ª Reg. | 3rd | |
| 1970–71 | 5 | 2ª Reg. | 11th | |
| 1971–72 | 5 | 2ª Reg. | 5th | |
| 1972–73 | 5 | 2ª Reg. | 13th | |
| 1973–74 | 5 | 2ª Reg. | 13th | |
| 1974–75 | 6 | 2ª Reg. | 7th | |
| 1975–76 | 6 | 2ª Reg. | 3rd | |
| 1976–77 | 5 | 1ª Reg. | 14th | |
| 1977–78 | 6 | 1ª Reg. | 15th | |
| 1978–79 | 7 | 2ª Reg. | 2nd | |

| Season | Tier | Division | Place | Copa del Rey |
|---|---|---|---|---|
| 1979–80 | 6 | 1ª Reg. | 10th | |
| 1980–81 | 6 | 1ª Reg. | 3rd | |
| 1981–82 | 6 | 1ª Reg. | 5th | |
| 1982–83 | 6 | 1ª Reg. | 12th | |
| 1983–84 | 6 | 1ª Reg. | 2nd | |
| 1984–85 | 5 | Reg. Pref. | 17th | |
| 1985–86 | 6 | 1ª Reg. | 1st | |
| 1986–87 | 5 | Reg. Pref. | 1st | |
| 1987–88 | 4 | 3ª | 4th | |
| 1988–89 | 4 | 3ª | 7th | |
| 1989–90 | 4 | 3ª | 7th | |
| 1990–91 | 4 | 3ª | 14th | |
| 1991–92 | 4 | 3ª | 15th | |
| 1992–93 | 4 | 3ª | 9th | |
| 1993–94 | 4 | 3ª | 2nd | |
| 1994–95 | 4 | 3ª | 17th | |
| 1995–96 | 4 | 3ª | 4th | |
| 1996–97 | 4 | 3ª | 10th | |
| 1997–98 | 4 | 3ª | 18th | |
| 1998–99 | 5 | Reg. Pref. | 15th | |

| Season | Tier | Division | Place | Copa del Rey |
|---|---|---|---|---|
| 1999–2000 | 5 | Reg. Pref. | 20th | |
| 2000–01 | 6 | 1ª Reg. | 12th | |
| 2001–02 | 6 | 1ª Reg. | 6th | |
| 2002–03 | 6 | 1ª Reg. | 5th | |
| 2003–04 | 6 | 1ª Reg. | 8th | |
| 2004–05 | 6 | 1ª Reg. | 3rd | |
| 2005–06 | 6 | 1ª Reg. | 6th | |
| 2006–07 | 6 | 1ª Reg. | 1st | |
| 2007–08 | 5 | Reg. Pref. | 9th | |
| 2008–09 | 5 | Reg. Pref. | 14th | |
| 2009–10 | 6 | 1ª Reg. | 2nd | |
| 2010–11 | 5 | Reg. Pref. | 4th | |
| 2011–12 | 5 | Reg. Pref. | 14th | |
| 2012–13 | 6 | 1ª Reg. | 1st | |
| 2013–14 | 5 | Reg. Pref. | 14th | |
| 2014–15 | 6 | 1ª Reg. | 7th | |
| 2015–16 | 7 | 1ª Reg. | 7th | |
| 2016–17 | 7 | 1ª Reg. | 4th | |
| 2017–18 | 7 | 1ª Reg. | 2nd | |
| 2018–19 | 7 | 1ª Reg. | 4th | |

| Season | Tier | Division | Place | Copa del Rey |
|---|---|---|---|---|
| 2019–20 | 7 | 1ª Reg. | 12th | |
| 2020–21 | DNP | | | |
| 2021–22 | 8 | 1ª Reg. | 2nd | |
| 2022–23 | 8 | 1ª Reg. | 1st | |
| 2023–24 | 7 | Reg. Pref. | 17th | |
| 2024–25 | 8 | 1ª Reg. | 8th | |
| 2025–26 | 8 | 1ª Reg. | | |

- 11 seasons in Tercera División

== Famous players ==
- (Spain) Eduardo Aizpún
- (Spain) Carlos Lapetra
- (Spain) Adolfo Marañón (as coach)
- (Spain) Enrique Enériz
- (Spain) Óscar Gurría
