= AD Colmenar Viejo =

Spanish football club

Colmenar Viejo
- Full name: Agrupación Deportiva; Colmenar Viejo
- Founded: 1967
- Ground: Campo Municipal de Deportes Alberto Ruiz, Colmenar Viejo, Madrid, Spain
- Capacity: 1,200
- Chairman: (Spain) Juan José Maroñas
- Manager: (Spain) Javier García
- League: Primera Autonómica de Aficionados – Group 1
- 2024–25: Primera Autonómica de Aficionados – Group 1, 3rd of 18
- Website: https://www.adcolmenarviejo.es/
Home colours	Away colours

Agrupación Deportiva Colmenar Viejo is a club of football of Colmenar Viejo in the Community of Madrid, in Spain. Founded as a non-professional club in 1967, it plays in Primera Autonómica de Aficionados – Group 1. The club plays its home matches at Campo Municipal de Deportes Alberto Ruiz, which has seating for 1,200 spectators.

== Season to season ==
Season	Tier	Division	Place	Copa del Rey
1967–68	6	3ª Reg.	13th	
1968–69	6	3ª Reg.	15th	
1969–70	7	3ª Reg.	3rd	
1970–71	7	3ª Reg.	1st	
1971–72	5	2ª Reg.	5th	
1972–73	5	2ª Reg.	16th	
1973–74	6	2ª Reg.	9th	
1974–75	6	2ª Reg.	5th	
1975–76	6	2ª Reg.	3rd	
1976–77	5	1ª Reg.	9th	
1977–78	5	Reg. Pref.	18th	
1978–79	6	1ª Reg.	13th	
1979–80	6	1ª Reg.	16th	
1980–81	7	2ª Reg.	1st	
1981–82	6	1ª Reg.	1st	
1982–83	5	Reg. Pref.	5th	
1983–84	5	Reg. Pref.	13th	
1984–85	5	Reg. Pref.	7th	
1985–86	5	Reg. Pref.	2nd	
1986–87	5	Reg. Pref.	3rd	

Season	Tier	Division	Place	Copa del Rey
1987–88	4	3ª	4th	
1988–89	4	3ª	10th	
1989–90	4	3ª	9th	
1990–91	4	3ª	15th	
1991–92	5	Reg. Pref.	1st	
1992–93	4	3ª	19th	
1993–94	5	Reg. Pref.	4th	
1994–95	4	3ª	6th	
1995–96	4	3ª	4th	
1996–97	4	3ª	7th	
1997–98	4	3ª	6th	
1998–99	4	3ª	6th	
1999–2000	4	3ª	18th	
2000–01	5	Reg. Pref.	9th	
2001–02	5	Reg. Pref.	5th	
2002–03	5	Reg. Pref.	8th	
2003–04	5	Reg. Pref.	2nd	
2004–05	4	3ª	18th	
2005–06	5	Reg. Pref.	3rd	
2006–07	4	3ª	21st	

Season	Tier	Division	Place	Copa del Rey
2007–08	5	Reg. Pref.	3rd	
2008–09	5	Reg. Pref.	2nd	
2009–10	4	3ª	10th	
2010–11	4	3ª	11th	
2011–12	4	3ª	5th	
2012–13	4	3ª	9th	
2013–14	4	3ª	12th	
2014–15	4	3ª	19th	
2015–16	5	Pref.	17th	
2016–17	5	Pref.	1st	
2017–18	4	3ª	19th	
2018–19	5	Pref.	18th	
2019–20	6	1ª Afic.	2nd	
2020–21	5	Pref.	6th	
2021–22	6	Pref.	6th	
2022–23	6	Pref.	12th	
2023–24	6	Pref.	8th	
2024–25	6	1ª Aut.	3rd	
2025–26	6	1ª Aut.		

- 20 seasons in Tercera División

== Ground ==
Colmenar Viejo plays its home games at Campo Municipal de Deportes Alberto Ruiz (Alberto Ruiz Municipal Sports Field); the field was re-furbished, complete with a 1,200-seat grandstand and 156 solar panels, for a grand re-opening in September 2007.
