= Llíria CF =

Llíria
- Full name: Llíria Club de Fútbol
- Founded: 1943
- Dissolved: 2020
- Ground: El Canó, Llíria, Valencia, Spain
- 2019–20: Segunda Regional – Group 6, 2nd
Home colours

Llíria Club de Fútbol was a Spanish football team based in Llíria, in the Valencian Community. Founded in 1943 as Club de Fútbol Llíria, the club changed name to Llíria CF in 1982, and was dissolved in 2020 after they merged with Atlètic Llíria to form Llíria UD.

== Season to season ==
Season	Tier	Division	Place	Copa del Rey
1944–45	5	2ª Reg.		
1945–46	5	2ª Reg.		
1946–47	5	2ª Reg.	1st	
1947–48	4	1ª Reg.	8th	
1948–49	4	1ª Reg.	11th	
1949–50	4	1ª Reg.	11th	
1950–51	4	1ª Reg.	12th	
1951–52	4	1ª Reg.	17th	
1952–1963	DNP			
1963–64	6	3ª Reg.	7th	
1964–65	6	3ª Reg.		
1965–66	6	3ª Reg.		
1966–67	6	3ª Reg.	1st	
1967–68	6	3ª Reg.		
1968–69	5	2ª Reg.	10th	
1969–70	5	2ª Reg.	3rd	
1970–71	5	1ª Reg.	1st	
1971–72	4	Reg. Pref.	8th	
1972–73	4	Reg. Pref.	18th	
1973–74	5	1ª Reg.	13th	

Season	Tier	Division	Place	Copa del Rey
1974–75	5	1ª Reg.	14th	
1975–76	5	1ª Reg.	15th	
1976–77	5	1ª Reg.	6th	
1977–78	6	1ª Reg.	3rd	
1978–79	6	1ª Reg.	2nd	
1979–80	6	1ª Reg.	17th	
1980–81	6	1ª Reg.	5th	
1981–82	6	1ª Reg.	5th	
1982–83	6	1ª Reg.	9th	
1983–84	6	1ª Reg.	6th	
1984–85	5	Reg. Pref.	14th	
1985–86	5	Reg. Pref.	3rd	
1986–87	5	Reg. Pref.	11th	
1987–88	5	Reg. Pref.	3rd	
1988–89	5	Reg. Pref.	2nd	
1989–90	4	3ª	10th	
1990–91	4	3ª	6th	
1991–92	4	3ª	2nd	
1992–93	3	2ª B	18th	Second round
1993–94	4	3ª	9th	First round

Season	Tier	Division	Place	Copa del Rey
1994–95	4	3ª	5th	
1995–96	4	3ª	1st	
1996–97	3	2ª B	20th	First round
1997–98	4	3ª	20th	
1998–99	5	Reg. Pref.	15th	
1999–2000	5	Reg. Pref.	13th	
2000–01	5	Reg. Pref.	18th	
2001–02	6	1ª Reg.	4th	
2002–03	6	1ª Reg.	3rd	
2003–04	6	1ª Reg.	4th	
2004–05	6	1ª Reg.	1st	
2005–06	5	Reg. Pref.	12th	
2006–07	5	Reg. Pref.	8th	

Season	Tier	Division	Place	Copa del Rey
2007–08	5	Reg. Pref.	10th	
2008–09	5	Reg. Pref.	13th	
2009–10	5	Reg. Pref.	7th	
2010–11	5	Reg. Pref.	12th	
2011–12	5	Reg. Pref.	9th	
2012–13	5	Reg. Pref.	17th	
2013–14	6	1ª Reg.	1st	
2014–15	5	Reg. Pref.	10th	
2015–16	5	Reg. Pref.	12th	
2016–17	5	Reg. Pref.	11th	
2017–18	5	Reg. Pref.	18th	
2018–19	6	1ª Reg.	14th	
2019–20	7	2ª Reg.	2nd	

- 2 seasons in Segunda División B
- 7 seasons in Tercera División
