= AD Orcasitas =

Spanish football club

Orcasitas
- Full name: Agrupación Deportiva Orcasitas
- Founded: 1960 (as CD Orcasitas)
- Ground: A.V. de Orcasitas, Madrid, Community of Madrid, Spain
- Capacity: 5000
- Chairman: (Spain) Gregorio López
- Manager: (Spain) Juan José Meco
- League: Primera Autonómica de Aficionados – Group 2
- 2024–25: Preferente de Aficionados – Group 3, 2nd of 18 (promoted)
| Home colours | Away colours |

Agrupación Deportiva Orcasitas is a Spanish football team from Usera district, Madrid. The club was founded on 1960, and play in Primera Autonómica de Aficionados – Group 2.

== Season to season ==
| Season | Tier | Division | Place | Copa del Rey |
|---|---|---|---|---|
| 1960–61 | 6 | 3ª Reg. | 5th | |
| 1961–62 | 6 | 3ª Reg. | 4th | |
| 1962–63 | 6 | 3ª Reg. | 1st | |
| 1963–64 | 5 | 2ª Reg. | 8th | |
| 1964–65 | 5 | 2ª Reg. | 5th | |
| 1965–66 | 5 | 2ª Reg. | 7th | |
| 1966–67 | 5 | 2ª Reg. | 3rd | |
| 1967–68 | 5 | 2ª Reg. | 3rd | |
| 1968–69 | 5 | 2ª Reg. | 2nd | |
| 1969–70 | 5 | 2ª Reg. | 1st | |
| 1991–92 | 4 | 1ª Reg. | 18th | |
| 1971–72 | 5 | 2ª Reg. | 6th | |
| 1972–73 | 5 | 2ª Reg. | 2nd | |
| 1973–74 | 5 | 1ª Reg. | 12th | |
| 1974–75 | 5 | 1ª Reg. | 15th | |
| 1975–76 | 5 | 1ª Reg. | 18th | |
| 1976–77 | 6 | 2ª Reg. | 10th | |
| 1977–78 | 7 | 2ª Reg. | 18th | |
| 1978–79 | 8 | 3ª Reg. P. | 1st | |
| 1979–80 | 7 | 2ª Reg. | 7th | |

| Season | Tier | Division | Place | Copa del Rey |
|---|---|---|---|---|
| 1980–81 | 7 | 2ª Reg. | 8th | |
| 1981–82 | 7 | 2ª Reg. | 8th | |
| 1982–83 | 6 | 1ª Reg. | 13th | |
| 1983–84 | 6 | 1ª Reg. | 16th | |
| 1984–85 | 7 | 2ª Reg. | 16th | |
| 1985–86 | 8 | 3ª Reg. P. | 9th | |
| 1986–87 | 7 | 2ª Reg. | 5th | |
| 1987–88 | 7 | 2ª Reg. | 4th | |
| 1988–89 | 7 | 2ª Reg. | 1st | |
| 1989–90 | 6 | 1ª Reg. | 2nd | |
| 1990–91 | 5 | Reg. Pref. | 9th | |
| 1991–92 | 5 | Reg. Pref. | 5th | |
| 1992–93 | 5 | Reg. Pref. | 3rd | |
| 1993–94 | 5 | Reg. Pref. | 1st | |
| 1994–95 | 4 | 3ª | 13th | |
| 1995–96 | 4 | 3ª | 2nd | |
| 1996–97 | 4 | 3ª | 18th | |
| 1997–98 | 5 | Reg. Pref. | 6th | |
| 1998–99 | 5 | Reg. Pref. | 4th | |
| 1999–2000 | 5 | Reg. Pref. | 4th | |

| Season | Tier | Division | Place | Copa del Rey |
|---|---|---|---|---|
| 2000–01 | 5 | Reg. Pref. | 1st | |
| 2001–02 | 4 | 3ª | 10th | |
| 2002–03 | 4 | 3ª | 13th | |
| 2003–04 | 4 | 3ª | 16th | |
| 2004–05 | 4 | 3ª | 17th | |
| 2005–06 | 5 | Reg. Pref. | 11th | |
| 2006–07 | 5 | Reg. Pref. | 13th | |
| 2007–08 | 5 | Reg. Pref. | 12th | |
| 2008–09 | 5 | Reg. Pref. | 16th | |
| 2009–10 | 6 | 1ª Afic. | 5th | |
| 2010–11 | 6 | 1ª Afic. | 2nd | |
| 2011–12 | 5 | Pref. | 17th | |
| 2012–13 | 6 | 1ª Afic. | 8th | |
| 2013–14 | 6 | 1ª Afic. | 17th | |
| 2014–15 | 7 | 2ª Afic. | 12th | |
| 2015–16 | 7 | 2ª Afic. | 6th | |
| 2016–17 | 7 | 2ª Afic. | 15th | |
| 2017–18 | 7 | 2ª Afic. | 8th | |
| 2018–19 | 7 | 2ª Afic. | 2nd | |
| 2019–20 | 6 | 1ª Afic. | 12th | |

| Season | Tier | Division | Place | Copa del Rey |
|---|---|---|---|---|
| 2020–21 | 6 | 1ª Afic. | 9th | |
| 2021–22 | 7 | 1ª Afic. | 9th | |
| 2022–23 | 7 | 1ª Afic. | 11th | |
| 2023–24 | 7 | 1ª Afic. | 9th | |
| 2024–25 | 7 | Pref. Afic. | 2nd | |
| 2025–26 | 6 | 1ª Aut. | | |

- 7 seasons in Tercera División

== Uniform ==
- Uniform holder Red shirt, blue trousers and half red.
- Uniform alternativeT-shirt, trousers and half white.

== Stadium ==
Their home stadium is the Estadio A.V. de Orcasitas, which seats 3,000 spectators.
