= CD Laguna (Valladolid) =

Association football club in Spain

Laguna
- Full name: Club Deportivo Laguna
- Founded: 1963
- Ground: La Laguna, Laguna de Duero, Castile and León, Spain
- Capacity: 2,500
- President: Luis Ángel Ausocua
- Manager: Mariano Gutiérrez
- League: Primera Provincial – Valladolid
- 2025–26: Primera Regional – Group B, 13th of 16 (relegated)
| Home colours | Away colours |

Club Deportivo Laguna is a Spanish football team based in Laguna de Duero, in the autonomous community of Castile and León. Founded in 1963, it plays in Primera Provincial – Valladolid, holding home matches at Estadio Municipal La Laguna, with a capacity of 2,500 people.

== History ==
Founded in 1963, Laguna first appeared in Tercera División in 1981. In 2012, after having appeared in 16 seasons in the fourth division, the club resigned from playing in the Primera Regional due to the lack of economic resources.

Back to an active status in 2013, Laguna achieved two consecutive promotions to return to the fifth division. In May 2023, the club returned to a national division after achieving promotion to Tercera Federación.

In 2024, after Salamanca CF UDS' promotion to Segunda Federación, Laguna was initially kept in the fifth division by the Royal Castile and León Football Federation. However, after the appeal of CD Mojados, Laguna was relegated to the Primera Regional after a decision from the Royal Spanish Football Federation, and later also appealed to ordinary justice, which gave the club the rights to also remain in Tercera Federación; in September, RFEF confirmed the group with 19 teams instead of 18, including both Laguna and Mojados in it.

== Season to season ==
| Season | Tier | Division | Place | Copa del Rey |
|---|---|---|---|---|
| 1968–69 | 5 | 2ª Reg. | 2nd | |
| 1969–70 | 5 | 2ª Reg. | 1st | |
| 1970–71 | 5 | 1ª Reg. | 2nd | |
| 1971–72 | 5 | 1ª Reg. | 4th | |
| 1972–73 | 5 | 1ª Reg. | 6th | |
| 1973–74 | 5 | 1ª Reg. | 2nd | |
| 1974–75 | 5 | 1ª Reg. | 1st | |
| 1975–76 | 4 | Reg. Pref. | 18th | |
| 1976–77 | 5 | 1ª Reg. | 3rd | |
| 1977–78 | 6 | 1ª Reg. | 1st | |
| 1978–79 | 5 | Reg. Pref. | 9th | |
| 1979–80 | 5 | Reg. Pref. | 14th | |
| 1980–81 | 5 | Reg. Pref. | 3rd | |
| 1981–82 | 4 | 3ª | 8th | |
| 1982–83 | 4 | 3ª | 19th | |
| 1983–84 | 5 | Reg. Pref. | 3rd | |
| 1984–85 | 5 | Reg. Pref. | 3rd | |
| 1985–86 | 5 | Reg. Pref. | 1st | |
| 1986–87 | 4 | 3ª | 17th | |
| 1987–88 | 4 | 3ª | 19th | |

| Season | Tier | Division | Place | Copa del Rey |
|---|---|---|---|---|
| 1988–89 | 5 | Reg. Pref. | 2nd | |
| 1989–90 | 5 | Reg. Pref. | 4th | |
| 1990–91 | 5 | Reg. Pref. | 3rd | |
| 1991–92 | 5 | Reg. Pref. | 1st | |
| 1992–93 | 4 | 3ª | 2nd | |
| 1993–94 | 4 | 3ª | 1st | |
| 1994–95 | 4 | 3ª | 5th | |
| 1995–96 | 4 | 3ª | 1st | |
| 1996–97 | 4 | 3ª | 11th | |
| 1997–98 | 4 | 3ª | 9th | |
| 1998–99 | 4 | 3ª | 14th | |
| 1999–2000 | 4 | 3ª | 10th | |
| 2000–01 | 4 | 3ª | 14th | |
| 2001–02 | 4 | 3ª | 20th | |
| 2002–03 | 5 | 1ª Reg. | 6th | |
| 2003–04 | 5 | 1ª Reg. | 8th | |
| 2004–05 | 5 | 1ª Reg. | 3rd | |
| 2005–06 | 5 | 1ª Reg. | 2nd | |
| 2006–07 | 4 | 3ª | 10th | |
| 2007–08 | 4 | 3ª | 17th | |

| Season | Tier | Division | Place | Copa del Rey |
|---|---|---|---|---|
| 2008–09 | 5 | 1ª Reg. | 3rd | |
| 2009–10 | 5 | 1ª Reg. | 7th | |
| 2010–11 | 5 | 1ª Reg. | 7th | |
| 2011–12 | 5 | 1ª Reg. | 3rd | |
| 2012–13 | DNP | | | |
| 2013–14 | 7 | 2ª Prov. | 1st | |
| 2014–15 | 6 | 1ª Prov. | 1st | |
| 2015–16 | 5 | 1ª Reg. | 13th | |
| 2016–17 | 5 | 1ª Reg. | 15th | |
| 2017–18 | 6 | 1ª Prov. | 12th | |
| 2018–19 | 6 | 1ª Prov. | 1st | |
| 2019–20 | 5 | 1ª Reg. | 13th | |
| 2020–21 | 5 | 1ª Reg. | 3rd | |
| 2021–22 | 6 | 1ª Reg. | 8th | |
| 2022–23 | 6 | 1ª Reg. | 1st | |
| 2023–24 | 5 | 3ª Fed. | 16th | |
| 2024–25 | 5 | 3ª Fed. | 19th | |
| 2025–26 | 6 | 1ª Reg. | 13th | |
| 2026–27 | 7 | 1ª Prov. | | |

- 16 seasons in Tercera División
- 2 seasons in Tercera Federación
