= Vallecas CF =

Vallecas
- Full name: Vallecas Club de Fútbol
- Founded: 1967
- Ground: Nuestra Señora de la Torre, Madrid, Spain
- Capacity: 2,500
- President: (Spain) César Méndez
- Manager: (Spain) Manuel Martín
- League: Segunda de Aficionados – Group 19
- 2024–25: Primera de Aficionados – Group 5, 14th of 18 (relegated)
Home colours	Away colours

Vallecas Club de Fútbol is a Spanish football team based in Vallecas, Madrid, in the autonomous community of Madrid. Founded in 1967, it plays in Segunda de Aficionados – Group 19, holding home games at Estadio Nuestra Señora de la Torre, which has a capacity of 2,500 spectators.

== History ==
Vallecas was founded in 1967, spending the first four decades of its existence fluctuating between the regional championships and the national fourth division.

== Season to season ==
Season	Tier	Division	Place	Copa del Rey
1967–68	6	3ª Reg.	1st	
1968–69	6	3ª Reg.	1st	
1969–70	5	2ª Reg.	2nd	
1970–71	5	2ª Reg.	2nd	
1971–72	4	1ª Reg.	16th	
1972–73	5	2ª Reg.	1st	
1973–74	5	1ª Reg.	11th	
1974–75	5	1ª Reg.	16th	
1975–76	6	2ª Reg.	3rd	
1976–77	5	1ª Reg.	16th	
1977–78	6	1ª Reg.	12th	
1978–79	6	1ª Reg.	9th	
1979–80	6	1ª Reg.	10th	
1980–81	6	1ª Reg.	1st	
1981–82	5	Reg. Pref.	5th	
1982–83	5	Reg. Pref.	14th	
1983–84	5	Reg. Pref.	18th	
1984–85	6	1ª Reg.	6th	
1985–86	6	1ª Reg.	2nd	
1986–87	5	Reg. Pref.	9th	

Season	Tier	Division	Place	Copa del Rey
1987–88	5	Reg. Pref.	1st	
1988–89	4	3ª	16th	
1989–90	4	3ª	13th	
1990–91	4	3ª	18th	
1991–92	5	Reg. Pref.	10th	
1992–93	5	Reg. Pref.	9th	
1993–94	5	Reg. Pref.	10th	
1994–95	5	Reg. Pref.	2nd	
1995–96	4	3ª	19th	
1996–97	5	Reg. Pref.	2nd	
1997–98	5	Reg. Pref.	4th	
1998–99	5	Reg. Pref.	6th	
1999–2000	5	Reg. Pref.	7th	
2000–01	5	Reg. Pref.	5th	
2001–02	5	Reg. Pref.	10th	
2002–03	5	Reg. Pref.	15th	
2003–04	6	1ª Reg.	3rd	
2004–05	6	1ª Reg.	4th	
2005–06	6	1ª Reg.	1st	
2006–07	5	Reg. Pref.	4th	

Season	Tier	Division	Place	Copa del Rey
2007–08	5	Reg. Pref.	2nd	
2008–09	4	3ª	9th	
2009–10	4	3ª	15th	
2010–11	4	3ª	18th	
2011–12	5	Pref.	9th	
2012–13	5	Pref.	15th	
2013–14	6	1ª Afic.	7th	
2014–15	6	1ª Afic.	5th	
2015–16	6	1ª Afic.	7th	
2016–17	6	1ª Afic.	12th	
2017–18	6	1ª Afic.	12th	
2018–19	6	1ª Afic.	17th	
2019–20	7	2ª Afic.	4th	
2020–21	7	2ª Afic.	2nd	
2021–22	7	1ª Afic.	17th	
2022–23	8	2ª Afic.	9th	
2023–24	8	2ª Afic.	7th	
2024–25	8	1ª Afic.	14th	
2025–26	9	2ª Afic.		

- 7 seasons in Tercera División

== Uniform ==
- Home: White shirt, blue shorts, white socks.
- Away: Red shirt, blue shorts, blue socks.

== Former players ==
- (Spain) (Dominican Republic) José Freijo
- (United States) (Italy) Colin Zizzi

== Club information ==
- Address: Calle Puerto de Reinosa s/n Vallecas (Madrid)
- Phone: 91 331 14 86
- Associates / Subscribers: 300 (approx.)
