= Pinoso CF =

Spanish football club

Pinoso
- Full name: Pinoso Club de Fútbol
- Founded: 1950
- Ground: Perfecto Rico Mira, Pinoso, Valencian Community, Spain
- Capacity: 3,000
- President: Salva Jover
- Head coach: Antonio Ortega
- League: Tercera FFCV – Group 13
- 2025–26: Tercera FFCV – Group 14, 4th of 15
Home colours	Away colours

Pinoso Club de Fútbol is a Spanish football team based in Pinoso, in the Valencian Community. Founded in 1950, they play in Tercera FFCV – Group 13, holding home matches at Estadio Municipal Perfecto Rico Mira, with a capacity of 3,000 people.

== History ==
Founded in 1950, Pinoso played in the regional leagues (mainly with the Football Federation of the Region of Murcia due to the city's proximity with the region) before being inactive during the 1985–86 season. The club moved to the Valencian Community Football Federation in 1987, subsequently achieving two consecutive promotions and reaching Tercera División for the first time ever.

Pinoso spent 13 consecutive seasons in Tercera (winning their group in 1992–93 and 1993–94) before suffering relegation in 2002. The club only returned to the fourth tier eleven years later, but only remained in the category for one campaign.

In August 2018, Pinoso's new board confirmed that the first team would be inactive for the 2018–19 season, while still maintaining the youth and women's sections active. The first team returned to action in 2019.

== Season to season ==
Season	Tier	Division	Place	Copa del Rey
1950–1968	—	Regional	—	
1968–69	5	2ª Reg.	12th	
1969–70	5	2ª Reg.	14th	
1970–71	5	2ª Reg.	6th	
1971–72	6	2ª Reg.	5th	
1972–73	6	2ª Reg.	7th	
1973–74	6	2ª Reg.	10th	
1974–75	6	2ª Reg.	12th	
1975–76	6	2ª Reg.	10th	
1976–77	6	2ª Reg.	2nd	
1977–78	6	1ª Reg.	7th	
1978–79	6	1ª Reg.	15th	
1979–80	6	1ª Reg.	18th	
1980–81	7	2ª Reg.	3rd	
1981–82	7	2ª Reg.	2nd	
1982–83	6	1ª Reg.	10th	
1983–84	6	1ª Reg.	11th	
1984–85	6	1ª Reg.	16th	
1985–86	DNP			
1986–87	7	2ª Reg.	1st	

Season	Tier	Division	Place	Copa del Rey
1987–88	6	1ª Reg.	2nd	
1988–89	5	Reg. Pref.	3rd	
1989–90	4	3ª	9th	
1990–91	4	3ª	7th	
1991–92	4	3ª	6th	
1992–93	4	3ª	1st	
1993–94	4	3ª	1st	First round
1994–95	4	3ª	4th	First round
1995–96	4	3ª	4th	
1996–97	4	3ª	5th	
1997–98	4	3ª	3rd	
1998–99	4	3ª	8th	
1999–2000	4	3ª	11th	
2000–01	4	3ª	10th	
2001–02	4	3ª	19th	
2002–03	5	Reg. Pref.	3rd	
2003–04	5	Reg. Pref.	3rd	
2004–05	5	Reg. Pref.	8th	
2005–06	5	Reg. Pref.	3rd	
2006–07	5	Reg. Pref.	9th	

Season	Tier	Division	Place	Copa del Rey
2007–08	5	Reg. Pref.	3rd	
2008–09	5	Reg. Pref.	7th	
2009–10	5	Reg. Pref.	8th	
2010–11	5	Reg. Pref.	12th	
2011–12	5	Reg. Pref.	7th	
2012–13	5	Reg. Pref.	3rd	
2013–14	4	3ª	20th	
2014–15	5	Reg. Pref.	16th	
2015–16	6	1ª Reg.	6th	
2016–17	6	1ª Reg.	2nd	
2017–18	5	Reg. Pref.	11th	
2018–19	DNP			
2019–20	7	2ª Reg.	1st	
2020–21	6	1ª Reg.	7th	
2021–22	7	1ª Reg.	4th	
2022–23	7	1ª Reg.	2nd	
2023–24	7	1ª FFCV	15th	
2024–25	8	2ª FFCV	16th	
2025–26	9	3ª FFCV	4th	
2026–27	9	3ª FFCV		

- 14 seasons in Tercera División
