= CD Betis San Isidro =

Spanish football club

Betis San Isidro
- Full name: Club Deportivo Betis San Isidro
- Founded: 1931; 95 years ago
- Ground: Antiguo Canódromo, Madrid, Madrid, Spain
- Capacity: 4,000
- League: Preferente de Aficionados – Group 3
- 2024–25: Preferente de Aficionados – Group 4, 8th of 18
Home colours	Away colours

Club Deportivo Betis San Isidro is a Spanish football club based in Madrid, in the namesake community. Founded in 1931, it plays in the Preferente de Aficionados – Group 3, holding home games at Estadio Antiguo Canódromo, with a capacity of 4,000 seats.

== Season to season ==
Season	Tier	Division	Place	Copa del Rey
1945–46	6	3ª Reg.	7th	
1946–47	7	3ª Reg.	9th	
1947–48	7	3ª Reg.	9th	
1948–49	7	3ª Reg.	3rd	
1949–50	7	3ª Reg.	12th	
1950–51	7	3ª Reg.	6th	
1951–52	7	3ª Reg.	3rd	
1952–53	7	3ª Reg.	12th	
1953–54	7	3ª Reg.	5th	
1954–55	7	4ª Reg.	(R)	
1955–56	DNP			
1956–57	7	4ª Reg.	8th	
1957–58	7	4ª Reg.	11th	
1958–59	7	4ª Reg.	6th	
1959–60	7	4ª Reg.	5th	
1960–61	7	4ª Reg.	2nd	
1961–62	6	3ª Reg.	7th	
1962–63	6	3ª Reg.	11th	
1963–64	6	3ª Reg.	4th	
1964–65	6	3ª Reg.	1st	

Season	Tier	Division	Place	Copa del Rey
1965–66	5	2ª Reg.	7th	
1966–67	5	2ª Reg.	13th	
1967–68	5	2ª Reg.	7th	
1968–69	5	2ª Reg.	16th	
1969–70	5	2ª Reg.	20th	
1970–71	6	3ª Reg. P.	16th	
1971–72	7	3ª Reg.	3rd	
1972–73	6	3ª Reg. P.	5th	
1973–74	7	3ª Reg. P.	8th	
1974–75	7	3ª Reg. P.	5th	
1975–76	6	2ª Reg.	19th	
1976–77	7	3ª Reg. P.	8th	
1977–78	8	3ª Reg. P.	12th	
1978–79	8	3ª Reg. P.	10th	
1979–80	8	3ª Reg. P.	16th	
1980–81	9	3ª Reg.	1st	
1981–82	8	3ª Reg. P.	6th	
1982–83	7	2ª Reg.	10th	
1983–84	7	2ª Reg.	10th	
1984–85	7	2ª Reg.	1st	

Season	Tier	Division	Place	Copa del Rey
1985–86	6	1ª Reg.	7th	
1986–87	6	1ª Reg.	9th	
1987–88	6	1ª Reg.	5th	
1988–89	6	1ª Reg.	2nd	
1989–90	5	Reg. Pref.	17th	
1990–91	6	1ª Reg.	4th	
1991–92	6	1ª Reg.	13th	
1992–93	6	1ª Reg.	5th	
1993–94	6	1ª Reg.	7th	
1994–95	6	1ª Reg.	9th	
1995–96	6	1ª Reg.	14th	
1996–97	7	2ª Reg.	1st	
1997–98	6	1ª Reg.	3rd	
1998–99	6	1ª Reg.	10th	
1999–2000	6	1ª Reg.	7th	
2000–01	6	1ª Reg.	11th	
2001–02	6	1ª Reg.	9th	
2002–03	6	1ª Reg.	12th	
2003–04	6	1ª Reg.	3rd	
2004–05	5	Reg. Pref.	14th	

Season	Tier	Division	Place	Copa del Rey
2005–06	5	Reg. Pref.	17th	
2006–07	6	1ª Reg.	11th	
2007–08	6	1ª Reg.	2nd	
2008–09	5	Reg. Pref.	8th	
2009–10	5	Pref.	6th	
2010–11	5	Pref.	13th	
2011–12	5	Pref.	13th	
2012–13	5	Pref.	17th	
2013–14	6	1ª Afic.	10th	
2014–15	6	1ª Afic.	8th	
2015–16	6	1ª Afic.	3rd	
2016–17	5	Pref.	15th	
2017–18	6	1ª Afic.	3rd	
2018–19	6	1ª Afic.	11th	
2019–20	6	1ª Afic.	5th	
2020–21	6	1ª Afic.	15th	
2021–22	8	2ª Afic.	4th	
2022–23	8	2ª Afic.	4th	
2023–24	8	2ª Afic.	1st	
2024–25	7	Pref. Afic.	8th	

Season	Tier	Division	Place	Copa del Rey
2025–26	7	Pref. Afic.		
