= Copa Federación de España (Catalonia tournament) =

Preliminary round of the Copa REFF held in Catalonia

The Catalonia tournament is the regionalised preliminary round of the Copa RFEF (a Spanish football tournament) held in Catalonia. Organized by the Catalan Football Federation, Catalan teams in Segunda División B and Tercera División (Group 5) that did not qualify for the Copa del Rey can register in this tournament, including reserve teams.

== History ==
| Year | Winner | Runner-up | Score |
|---|---|---|---|
| 1993 | Terrassa | Martinenc | 4–1, 2–2 |
| 1994 | Balaguer | Only team registered | |
| 1995 | Espanyol B | Balaguer | 2–1 |
| 1996 | Gavà | Sabadell | 6–2, 2–0 |
| 1997 | Terrassa | Espanyol B | 2–1 |
| 1998 | Sabadell | Barcelona C | 3–1 |
| 1999 | Sabadell | Barcelona B | League |
| 2000 | Terrassa | Espanyol B | 1–2, 4–2 |
| 2001 | Palamós | Terrassa | 1–1, 0–2 |
| 2002 | Reus | Sabadell | 2–0 |
| 2003 | Gavà | Palamós | 1–1, 0–3 |
| 2004 | Mataró | Sabadell | 1–1, 0–2 |
| 2005 | Sabadell | Sant Andreu | 0–1, 1–1 |
| 2006 | Sabadell | Espanyol B | 1–2, 1–2 (4–3 p) |
| 2007 | Espanyol B | Gavà | 1–1, 1–2 |
| 2008 | Espanyol B | Miapuesta Castelldefels | 0–2, 5–0 |
| 2009 | Lleida | Gavà | 4–0, 1–2 |
| 2010 | Sabadell | Lleida | 0–0, 0–1 |
| 2011 | Santboià | Pobla de Mafumet | 2–0, 1–0 |
| 2012 | Sant Andreu | Pobla de Mafumet | 2–0, 2–0 (5–4 p) |
| 2013 | Espanyol B | Llagostera | 2–3, 2–1 |
| 2014 | Prat | Montañesa | 2–1 |
| 2015 | Badalona | Pobla de Mafumet | 1–0, 4–1 |
| 2016 | Badalona | Pobla de Mafumet | 0–2, 2–1 |
| 2017 | Vilafranca | Cornellà | 2–1 |
| 2018 | Llagostera | Only team registered | |
| 2019 | Prat | Vilafranca | 2–1 |
| 2020 | Not played | | |
| 2021 | Lleida Esportiu | Sant Andreu | 3–1 / 3–0 |
| 2022 | Terrassa | Badalona | 1–1 (4–3 p) |

== Champions ==
Editions with only one team registered are not included in this ranking.

| Teams | Winners | Runners-up | Winning years |
|---|---|---|---|
| Sabadell | 5 | 3 | 1998, 1999, 2005, 2006, 2010 |
| Espanyol B | 4 | 3 | 1995, 2007, 2008, 2013 |
| Terrassa | 4 | 1 | 1993, 1997, 2000, 2022 |
| Gavà | 2 | 2 | 1996, 2003 |
| Badalona | 2 | 1 | 2015, 2016 |
| Prat | 2 | 0 | 2014, 2019 |
| Sant Andreu | 1 | 2 | 2012 |
| Palamós | 1 | 1 | 2001 |
| Lleida | 1 | 1 | 2009 |
| Santboià | 1 | 1 | 2011 |
| Vilafranca | 1 | 1 | 2017 |
| Reus | 1 | 0 | 2002 |
| Mataró | 1 | 0 | 2004 |
| Lleida Esportiu | 1 | 0 | 2021 |
| Pobla de Mafumet | 0 | 4 | |
| Martinenc | 0 | 1 | |
| Balaguer | 0 | 1 | |
| Barcelona C | 0 | 1 | |
| Barcelona B | 0 | 1 | |
| Miapuesta Castelldefels | 0 | 1 | |
| Llagostera | 0 | 1 | |
| Montañesa | 0 | 1 | |
| Cornellà | 0 | 1 | |
