= Copa Federación de España (Basque tournament) =

Annual football competition in Spain

The Basque Country tournament is an annual football competition held in Spain which serves as the preliminary round of the Copa Federación de España (Copa RFEF) in the Basque Country (Euskadi) region. Organised by the Basque Football Federation, the participating clubs in the tournament are drawn from the Tercera División (Group 4), as well as local clubs in the Segunda División B who have not qualified for the season's Copa del Rey, including reserve teams and farm teams. Not all teams eligible take part each year.

As the Copa RFEF is for lower division clubs, the top sides in the region such as Athletic Bilbao and Real Sociedad have never entered the main competition or the qualifying phase. However, Deportivo Alavés have taken part in the national phase, and their B-team won the Basque tournament three years in a row from 2015.

== Format ==
The regional tournament is usually played between July and October, the format depends on the number of registered teams, and the winner receives a €3,000 prize.

The champion qualifies to the National phase of the Copa RFEF. At that point, losing teams from the first round of the Copa del Rey, usually including at least one Basque club, are also invited to the Copa RFEF, but often they decline to participate in order to concentrate on the league.

The opening nationwide rounds pair entrants from either the same autonomous community or one nearby (such as Navarre or Cantabria), so it is common for the Basque teams to eliminate each other.

== History ==
The most successful Basque qualifier to the national phase was Real Unión, who won the entire competition in 2015, defeating CD Castellón 4–0 on aggregate.

SD Lemona were finalists in 2011 and 2012, with the latter event producing a dramatic outcome: having lost the first leg away to CD Binissalem by a 5–0 score, Lemona turned the tie on its head at home, winning 6–1. They lost on away goals, being unable to add to their tally in the last 15 minutes of the match. Within a few months of the final, the club had dissolved due to financial problems. Lemona also have the best overall record in the qualifying tournament, winning five times in 16 years.

Season	Winner	Runner-up	Progress	Notes
1993–94	Amurrio		First round	
1994–95	Aurrerá		Quarter-final	
1995–96	Lemona		First round	
1996–97	Lemona		First round	
1997–98	Elgoibar		Round of 16	
1998–99	Real Unión		Round of 16	
1999–2000	Lemona		Preliminary round	
2000–01	Amurrio		Preliminary round	
2001–02	Real Sociedad B		Round of 16	
2002–03	Aurrerá		Round of 16	
2003–04	Amurrio	Sestao	Round of 16	Eliminated Zalla
2004–05	Aurrerá	N/A (Note: Aurrerá were the only team to enter the Basque autonomous phase.)	Qualifying round	
2005–06	Indautxu	Aurrerá	Round of 16	
2006–07	Amurrio	Lemona	Round of 16	Eliminated Oyonesa (Note: Oyonesa is a team which is based in the Basque Country (Oion) but plays in the Riojan Tercera section and was the qualifier from the tournament in that region.)
2007–08	Amorebieta	Zarautz	Round of 32	
2008–09	Leioa	Gernika	Qualifying round	
2009–10	Barakaldo	Portugalete	Semi-finals	Eliminated Lemona and Alavés
2010–11	Lemona	Zalla	Runners-up	
2011–12	Lemona	Zalla	Runners-up	Eliminated Amorebieta
2012–13	Zalla	Aurrerá	Round of 32	Zalla eliminated by CD Laudio
2013–14	Balmaseda	Alavés B	Semi-finals	Eliminated Real Unión
2014–15	Real Unión	Gernika	Winners	Eliminated Amorebieta
2015–16	Alavés B	Berio	Round of 32	
2016–17	Alavés B	Zalla	Round of 16	Alavés B eliminated by Real Unión
2017–18	Alavés B	Getxo	Round of 32	
2018–19	Real Unión	Zamudio	Quarter-final	Eliminated Cultural Durango
2019–20	Cultural Durango	Real Unión	Round of 16	
2020–21	Balmaseda	Real Unión	Round of 16	Eliminated Barakaldo
2021–22	Leioa	N/A (Note: Leioa were nominated automatically by the Federation.)	Semi-final	

=== Champions ===
Editions with only one team registered not included in this ranking.

Teams	Winners	Runners-up	Winning years
Lemona	5	1	1995–96, 1996–97, 1999–2000, 2010–11, 2011–12
Amurrio	4	0	1993–94, 2000–01, 2003–04, 2006–07
Real Unión	3	2	1998–99, 2014–15, 2018–19
Alavés B	3	1	2015–16, 2016–17, 2017–18
Aurrerá Vitoria	2	2	1994–95, 2002–03
Zalla	1	3	2012–13
Amorebieta	1	0	2007–08
Barakaldo	1	0	2009–10
Leioa	1	0	2008–09
Indautxu	1	0	2005–06
Balmaseda	2	0	2013–14, 2020–21
Cultural Durango	1	0	2019–20
Leioa	1	0	2008–09
Real Sociedad B	1	0	2001–02
Elgoibar	1	0	1997–98
Gernika	0	2	–
Sestao	0	1	–
Portugalete	0	1	–
Zarautz	0	1	–
Berio	0	1	–
Getxo	0	1	–
Zamudio	0	1	–

== Previous competitions ==
From 1930 until 1987, Biscay and Gipuzkoa operated separate provincial competitions for their non-professional clubs, with the winners of each qualifying for the national Campeonato de Aficionados, the predecessor to the Copa Federación. The most successful team in Biscay was Erandio with 13 wins, far ahead of Indautxu on 6, while in Gipuzkoa Real Unión, CD Logroñés and Mondragón won four titles apiece.
