= Copa Federación de España (Galicia tournament) =

The Galicia tournament is the previous round of the Copa RFEF in Galicia. Organized by the Galician Football Federation, the Regional teams in Segunda División B and the best teams of the Tercera División (Group 3) not qualified to the Copa del Rey play this tournament, including farm teams.

It is usually played between July and October, and the champion of the tournament qualifies to the National tournament of the Copa RFEF.

== Format ==
The tournament is played usually as a knock-out tournament.

== History ==
Year	Winner	Runner-up	Score
1994	Betanzos		
1995	Deportivo La Coruña B		
1996	Cerceda		
1998	Racing Ferrol		
1999	Lugo		
1999	Compostela B		
2000	Pontevedra	Betanzos	2–1
2001	Celta Vigo B	Compostela B	4–1, 1–1
2002	Rápido de Bouzas		
2003	Celta Vigo B	Lugo	0–1, 3–0
2004	Celta Vigo B	Lugo	1–0, 0–0
2005	Coruxo	Negreira	3–0, 0–2
2006	Celta Vigo B	Coruxo	3–1, 1–2
2007	Ourense	Cerceda	1–1, 1–0
2008	Coruxo	Lalín	0–1, 2–0
2009	Cerceda	Racing Ferrol	1–1, 1–1 (5–4 p)
2010	Montañeros	Racing Ferrol	2–2 (3–0 p)
2011	Coruxo	Racing Ferrol	1–1 (4–3 p)
2012	Rápido de Bouzas	Cerceda	4–2
2013	Ourense	Compostela	1–0
2014	Boiro	Coruxo	3–1
2015	Rápido de Bouzas	Cerceda	3–0
2016	Arosa	Pontevedra	1–0
2017	Silva	Alondras	2–1
2018	Bergantiños	Ribadumia	2–2 (3–2 p)

== Champions ==
Teams	Winners	Winning years
Celta Vigo B	4	2001, 2003, 2004, 2006
Coruxo	3	2005, 2008, 2011
Rápido de Bouzas	3	2002, 2012, 2015
Cerceda	2	1996, 2009
Ourense	2	2007, 2013
Betanzos	1	1994
Deportivo La Coruña B	1	1995
Racing Ferrol	1	1997
Lugo	1	1998
Compostela B	1	1999
Pontevedra	1	2000
Montañeros	1	2010
Boiro	1	2014
Arosa	1	2016
Silva	1	2017
Bergantiños	1	2018
