= Copa Federación de España (Murcia tournament) =

The Murcia tournament is the previous round of the Copa RFEF in the Region of Murcia. Organized by the Football Federation of the Region of Murcia, the Murcia teams in Segunda División B and the best teams of the Tercera División (Group 13) not qualified to the Copa del Rey play this tournament, including farm teams.

It is usually played between July and October, and the champion of the tournament qualifies to the National tournament of the Copa RFEF. Since 1999, the final is played in only one game and since 2001, the qualifying round is composed by four groups of three teams.

FC Cartagena is the team with most titles.

== History ==
Year	Location	Winner	Runner-up	Score
1995		Murcia	Lorca CF	
1996		Cartagonova		
1997		Cartagonova		
1998		Murcia		
1999		Águilas CF		
2000		Cartagonova		
2001		Lorca CF	Mar Menor-San Javier	
2002		Lorca Deportiva CF	Frutas de Abarán	
2003		Pinatar	Águilas CF	2–1, 4–2
2004	Competition not played			
2005	League system	Mar Menor-San Javier	Lorquí	—
2006		Mazarrón	Mar Menor-San Javier	2–0
2007		Pinatar	Ciudad de Lorquí	3–1
2008	La Flota, Murcia	Lorca Deportiva CF B	Jumilla CF	1–0
2009	Campus de Espinardo, Murcia	Jumilla CF	Atlético Pulpileño	2–1
2010	Juan Cayuela, Totana	Caravaca CF	Cartagena FC	2–0
2011	El Rubial, Águilas	Atlético Pulpileño	La Unión	2–1
2012	Ángel Sornichero, Alcantarilla	La Hoya Lorca	Plus Ultra	2–1
2013	La Arboleja, Cieza	Yeclano Deportivo	El Palmar	3–1
2014	Pitín, San Javier	Cartagena FC	El Palmar	4–1
2015	Juan Cayuela, Totana	CF Lorca Deportiva	Alhama	2–1
2016	Campus de Espinardo, Murcia	UCAM Murcia B	Nueva Vanguardia	3–0
2017	Pitín, San Javier	FC Cartagena B	Murcia Imperial	3–2
2018	Pitín, San Javier	FC Cartagena B	Estudiantes	3–1

== Champions ==
Teams	Winners	Winning years
FC Cartagena	3	1996, 1997, 2000
Murcia	2	1995, 1998
Pinatar	2	2003, 2007
FC Cartagena B	2	2017, 2018
Águilas CF	1	1999
Lorca CF	1	2001
Lorca Deportiva CF	1	2002
Mar Menor-San Javier	1	2004
Mazarrón CF	1	2006
Lorca Deportiva CF B	1	2008
Jumilla CF	1	2009
Caravaca CF	1	2010
Atlético Pulpileño	1	2011
Lorca FC	1	2012
Yeclano Deportivo	1	2013
Cartagena FC	1	2014
CF Lorca Deportiva	1	2015
UCAM Murcia B	1	2016
