= Copa Federación de España (Cantabria tournament) =

The Cantabria tournament is the previous round of the Copa RFEF in Cantabria. Organized by the Cantabrian Football Federation, the Cantabrian teams in Segunda División B and the best teams of the Tercera División (Group 3) not qualified to the Copa del Rey play this tournament, including farm teams.

It is usually played between July and October, and the champion of the tournament qualifies to the National tournament of the Copa RFEF.

Racing de Santander B is the team with most titles.

== Format ==
Since 2014, the tournament is played by the eight best teams that did not qualify to Copa del Rey. It is played by a knockout system with single-game series, and the final is played at Campos de Sport de El Sardinero, in Santander.

The winner receives a €3,000 prize and every team earns €500 per game played.

== History ==
Year	Winner	Runner-up	1st leg	2nd leg	Score
1996	Tropezón				
1997		Tropezón			
1998	Racing Santander B	Cayón	0–0	0–0	0–0
1999	Noja	Gimnástica Torrelavega			
2000					
2001	Tropezón				
2002					
2003	Racing Santander B	Noja	0–2	2–4	4–4
2004	Velarde	Reocín	0–2	1–3	3–3
2005	Racing Santander B	Gimnástica Torrelavega	1–0	3–1	3–2
2006	Racing Santander B	Tropezón	2–1	0–2	4–1
2007	Racing Santander B	Tropezón	0–2	2–0	4–0
2008	Racing Santander B	Noja	0–0	3–2	3–2
2009	Noja	Castro	2–1	4–4	6–5
2010	Racing Santander B	Cayón	0–0	2–1	2–1
2011	Racing Santander B	Siete Villas	3–0	1–1	4–1
2012	Racing Santander B	Rayo Cantabria	3–1	0–2	5–1
2013	Laredo	Gimnástica Torrelavega	2–1	1–0	2–2
2014	Tropezón	Laredo	3–2		
2015	Gimnástica Torrelavega	Cayón	1–0		
2016	Racing Santander B	Rayo Cantabria	1–0		
2017	Escobedo	Cayón	3–0		
2018	Tropezón	Escobedo	3–2		
2019	Tropezón	Gimnástica Torrelavega	3–1		

== Champions ==
Teams	Winners	Runners-up	Winning years
Racing Santander B	10	0	1998, 2003, 2005, 2006, 2007, 2008, 2010, 2011, 2012, 2016
Tropezón	5	3	1996, 2001, 2014, 2018, 2019
Noja	2	2	1999, 2009
Gimnástica Torrelavega	1	4	2015
Laredo	1	1	2013
Escobedo	1	1	2017
Velarde	1	0	2004
Cayón	0	4	
Rayo Cantabria	0	2	
Reocín	0	1	
Castro	0	1	
Siete Villas	0	1	
