= Copa Federación de España (Castile and León tournament) =

The Castile and León tournament is the previous round of the Copa RFEF in Castile and León. Organized by the Football Federation of Castile and León, the regional teams in Segunda División B and Tercera División (Group 8) that did not qualify for the Copa del Rey can play voluntarily this tournament, including reserve teams.

== Format ==
The tournament is played between July and October, and the champion of the tournament qualifies to the National tournament of the Copa RFEF.

== History ==
| Year | Winner | Runner-up | Score |
|---|---|---|---|
| 1994 | Zamora | Salamanca B | 1–1, 1–3 |
| 1995 | Zamora | Real Burgos | 2–2, 0–0 (a) |
| 1996 | Burgos | Zamora | 2–0, 0–5 |
| 1997 | Cultural Leonesa | CF Palencia | 1–0, 4–0 |
| 1998 | Burgos | Gimnástica Segoviana | 3–0, 0–1 |
| 1999 | Arandina | Only team registered | |
| 2000 | Arandina | Only team registered | |
| 2001 | Atlético Tordesillas | La Bañeza | League |
| 2002 | La Bañeza | CF Palencia | 1–2, 3–1 |
| 2003 | Guijuelo | La Bañeza | 1–2, 4–0 |
| 2004 | Ponferrada Promesas | La Bañeza | 1–0, 0–2 |
| 2005 | Guijuelo | La Bañeza | League |
| 2006 | Guijuelo | Arandina | 1–0, 1–2 |
| 2007 | Laguna | Guijuelo | League |
| 2008 | Burgos | Huracán Z | 2–1 |
| 2009 | Villaralbo | Only team registered | |
| 2010 | Arandina | Only team registered | |
| 2011 | Gimnástica Segoviana | Arandina | League |
| 2012 | Burgos | Arandina | 0–2, 0–1 |
| 2013 | Arandina | Cultural Leonesa | 0–1, 3–0 |
| 2014 | Arandina | Burgos | League |
| 2015 | Ciudad Rodrigo | Villaralbo | League |
| 2016 | Arandina | Atlético Astorga | League |
| 2017 | Burgos | Ávila | 2–1, 1–1 |
| 2018 | Arandina | Burgos | League |
| 2019 | Arandina | Real Burgos | 0–1, 3–0 |
| 2020 | Unionistas | Arandina | 3–1 |

== Champions ==
Not included titles given as only registered team.

| Teams | Winners | Runners-up | Winning years |
|---|---|---|---|
| Arandina | 5 | 4 | 2013, 2014, 2016, 2018, 2019 |
| Burgos | 5 | 2 | 1996, 1998, 2008, 2012, 2017 |
| Guijuelo | 3 | 1 | 2003, 2005, 2006 |
| Zamora | 2 | 1 | 1994, 1995 |
| La Bañeza | 1 | 4 | 2002 |
| Cultural Leonesa | 1 | 1 | 1997 |
| Gimnástica Segoviana | 1 | 1 | 2011 |
| Atlético Tordesillas | 1 | 0 | 2001 |
| Ponferrada Promesas | 1 | 0 | 2004 |
| Laguna | 1 | 0 | 2007 |
| Ciudad Rodrigo | 1 | 0 | 2015 |
| Unionistas | 1 | 0 | 2020 |
| CF Palencia | 0 | 2 | |
| Real Burgos | 0 | 2 | |
| Salamanca B | 0 | 1 | |
| Huracán Z | 0 | 1 | |
| Villaralbo | 0 | 1 | |
| Atlético Astorga | 0 | 1 | |
| Ávila | 0 | 1 | |
