= Copa Federación de España (Asturias tournament) =

Copa Federación
- Founded: 1994
- Region: Asturias
- Current champions: Avilés (4th title)
- Most championships: Marino Luanco (6 titles)
- Website: http://www.rfef.es/tags/copa-rfef
- 2021 Copa Federación

The Asturias tournament is the previous round of the Copa RFEF in Asturias. Organized by the Royal Asturias Football Federation, the Asturian teams in Segunda División RFEF and the best teams of the Tercera División RFEF (Group 2) non qualified to the Copa del Rey (making a total of 12 teams) play this tournament, including farm teams. Real Sporting is the only team who never played the Copa Federación due to playing in higher divisions.

== Format ==
The tournament is played between July and October, and the champion of the tournament qualifies to the National tournament of the Copa RFEF. Since 1999, the final is played in only one game and since 2001, the qualifying round is composed by four groups of three teams where the four group winners qualify for the semifinals, except for the 2020 edition where it was a knockout tournament for reducing the number of games due to the COVID-19 pandemic in Asturias.

The first edition was held in 1994 and was won by Club Siero.

Since 2019, reserve teams were excluded of the competition.

== History ==
Year	Stadium	Host	Winner	Runner-up	Score
1994–95	Double legged final		Siero	Sporting B	2–1, 1–1
1995	Double legged final		Caudal	Sporting B	3–1, 1–1
1996	Double legged final		Sporting B	Navia	4–1, 2–2
1997	Double legged final		Langreo	Lealtad	0–0, 3–0
1998	Double legged final		Caudal	Sporting B	2–1, 1–0
1999	Suárez Puerta	Avilés	Avilés	Tuilla	4–1
2000	Carlos Tartiere (I)	Oviedo	Marino	Llanes	5–0
2001	Hermanos Llana	Oviedo	Avilés	Langreo	2–0
2002	Suárez Puerta	Avilés	Avilés	Sporting B	2–0
2003	Miramar	Luanco	Sporting B	Lealtad	1–0
2004	Covadonga	Roces	Marino	Oviedo ACF	1–1 (5–4 p)
2005	Hermanos Antuña	Mieres	Caudal	Oviedo ACF	2–0
2006	Ganzábal	La Felguera	Marino	Sporting B	1–1 (5–4 p)
2007	El Bayu	Pola de Siero	Tuilla	Langreo	0–0 (3–2 p)
2008	Marqués de la Vega de Anzo	Grado	Langreo	Marino	1–0
2009	La Mata	Candás	Marino	Caudal	3–2
2010	Carlos Tartiere	Oviedo	Candás	Langreo	2–0
2011	El Bayu	Siero	Tuilla	Langreo	1–0
2012	Suárez Puerta	Avilés	Tuilla	Sporting B	2–0
2013	Pepe Ortiz	Mareo	Marino	Avilés	1–0
2014	La Corredoria	Posada de Llanes	Sporting B	Langreo	2–2 (8–7 p)
2015	Hermanos Antuña	Mieres	Marino	Tuilla	1–0
2016	José Antonio Álvarez Rabanal	Oviedo	Sporting B	Avilés	3–1
2017	El Bayu	Pola de Siero	Langreo	Marino	0–0 (5–4 p)
2018	Hermanos Antuña	Mieres	Lealtad	Sporting B	1–1 (4–3 p)
2019	Santa Cruz	Gijón	Llanes	Tuilla	2–1
2020	Hermanos Antuña	Mieres	Caudal	Marino	1–0
2021	Sergio Sánchez	El Berrón	Avilés	Llanes	1–1 (4–3 p)
2022	Las Tolvas	Laviana	Avilés	Llanera	1–1 (5–4 p)
2023	La Mata	Candás	Marino	Llanera	1–0
2024	Suárez Puerta	Avilés	Avilés	Caudal	0–0 (5–4 p)
2025	Marqués de la Vega de Anzo	Grado	Marino	Mosconia	1–0

== Champions ==
Teams	Winners	Runners-up	Winning years
Marino	8	3	2000, 2004, 2006, 2009, 2013, 2015, 2023, 2025
Avilés	6	2	1999, 2001, 2002, 2021, 2022, 2024
Sporting B	4	7	1996, 2003, 2014, 2016
Caudal	4	2	1995, 1998, 2005, 2020
Langreo	3	5	1997, 2008, 2017
Tuilla	3	2	2007, 2011, 2012
Lealtad	1	2	2018
Llanes	1	2	2019
Siero	1	0	1994
Candás	1	0	2010
Astur	0	2	
Llanera	0	2	
Navia	0	1	
Mosconia	0	1	

== Performance of Asturian teams in the National tournament ==
- In **bold**, teams qualified as Regional champions.

Team	1995	1996	1997	1998	1999	2000	2001	2002	2003	2004	2005	2006	2007	2008	2009	2010	2011	2012	2013	2014	2015	2016	2017	2018	2019	2020	2021	2022	2023	2024	2025
Avilés						**QF**		**R16**	**C**	R16														R32			**R16**	**R32**		**R32**	
Candás																	**R32**														
Caudal		**SF**			**R16**					R32		**R32**		QR												**R32**					
Condal																						R16									
Covadonga																															R32
L'Entregu																													QF		
Langreo				**R16**					R32						**R16**									**R16**		R16	R32				
Lealtad							R16																							R16	
Llanes																									**R32**						
Marino							**C**	R32	R16		**R32**		**R32**			**QF**				**R16**	R32	**R32**							**R16**		**R32**
Oviedo											SF		R16							W											
Siero	**R16**																														
Sporting B			**SF**							**QF**											**R32**		**QF**								
Tuilla														**SF**				**R32**	**R32**												
Universidad													QR																		
