= List of Burgos CF seasons =

This is a list of seasons played by Burgos CF in Spanish football, from 1994 to the most recent completed season. It details the club's achievements in major competitions, and the top scorers in league games for each season.

== Key ==
Key to league record

- Pos = Final position
- Pld = Games played
- W = Games won
- D = Games drawn
- L = Games lost
- GF = Goals for
- GA = Goals against
- Pts = Points

Key to rounds

- W = Winner
- RU = Runner-up
- SF = Semi-finals
- QF = Quarter-finals
- R16 = Round of 16
- R32 = Round of 32
- R64 = Round of 64
- R6 = Sixth round
- R5 = Fifth round
- R4 = Fourth round
- R3 = Third round
- R2 = Second round
- R1 = First round
- GS = Group stage
- QR = Qualifying round

== Seasons ==
Season	League											Cup	Copa Federación		Top scorer (Note: All goals scored in league games, not including playoffs.)	
Season	Tier	Division	Gr	Pos	Pld	W	D	L	GF	GA	Pts	Cup	Copa Federación		Name(s)	Goal
1994–95	6	1ª Provincial		1st	32	28	2	2	131	12	58					
1995–96	5	1ª Regional	1	1st	36	30	3	3	107	24	93					
1996–97	4	Tercera División	8	1st	36	28	4	4	81	23	88		Regional stage	C		
1996–97	4	Tercera División	PO		6	4	2	0	10	2	14		National stage	C		
1997–98	3	Segunda División B	2	15th	38	11	12	15	31	37	45	R2			(Spain) Asier Garitano	8
1998–99	3	Segunda División B	2	4th	38	18	12	8	44	24	66	R1	Regional stage	C	(Spain) Asier Garitano	11
1998–99	3	Segunda División B	PO		6	2	1	3	7	7	7	R1	National stage	R16	(Spain) Asier Garitano	11
1999–00	3	Segunda División B	2	3rd	38	19	13	6	58	26	70	R1	National stage	SF	(Spain) Roberto Peragón	17
1999–00	3	Segunda División B	PO		6	3	1	2	11	7	10	R1	National stage	SF	(Spain) Roberto Peragón	17
2000–01	3	Segunda División B	2	1st	38	20	12	6	53	20	72	R64			(Spain) Juan Cuyami	10
2000–01	3	Segunda División B	PO		6	5	1	0	7	1	16	R64			(Spain) Juan Cuyami	10
2001–02	2	Segunda División		16th (Note: Administratively relegated.)	42	12	16	14	31	37	52	R1			(Argentina) Daniel Pendín	7
2002–03	3	Segunda División B	2	3rd	38	15	14	9	38	28	59	R1			(Spain) Jorge Barbarin	16
2002–03	3	Segunda División B	PO		6	2	1	3	5	6	7	R1			(Spain) Jorge Barbarin	16
2003–04	3	Segunda División B	2	5th	38	17	14	7	50	33	65	R1			(Spain) Aritz Aduriz	16
2004–05	3	Segunda División B	2	3rd	38	17	12	9	44	24	63	R64			(Venezuela) Carlos García	17
2004–05	3	Segunda División B	PO		2	0	1	1	0	1		R64			(Venezuela) Carlos García	17
2005–06	3	Segunda División B	2	3rd	38	17	13	8	48	38	64	R4			(Spain) Roberto	10
2005–06	3	Segunda División B	PO		0	0	3	1	0	1		R4			(Spain) Roberto	10
2006–07	3	Segunda División B	2	2nd	38	20	9	9	51	24	69	R3			(Spain) Asier Goiria	18
2006–07	3	Segunda División B	PO		0	0	3	1	0	1		R3			(Spain) Asier Goiria	18
2007–08	3	Segunda División B	2	18th	38	9	13	16	30	39	40	R32			(Spain) Nacho Garrido	7
2008–09	4	Tercera División	8	3rd	38	23	12	3	71	18	81		Regional stage	C	(Spain) Nel	17
2008–09	4	Tercera División	PO		4	1	1	2	4	4			National stage	QF	(Spain) Nel	17
2009–10	4	Tercera División	8	1st	38	27	9	2	62	18	90				(Spain) Txitxo	19
2009–10	4	Tercera División	PO		4	0	1	3	1	2					(Spain) Txitxo	19
2010–11	4	Tercera División	8	1st	38	25	9	4	75	23	84	R1	National stage	QR	(Spain) Hugo Salamanca	20
2010–11	4	Tercera División	PO		2	1	0	1	5	2		R1	National stage	QR	(Spain) Hugo Salamanca	20
2011–12	3	Segunda División B	2	20th	38	7	7	24	29	63	28	R1	National stage	R32	(Spain) Yahvé	6
2012–13	4	Tercera División	8	1st	38	28	6	4	80	19	90		Regional stage	C	(Spain) Fernando Carralero	25
2012–13	4	Tercera División	PO		2	1	1	0	3	2			National stage	QF	(Spain) Fernando Carralero	25
2013–14	3	Segunda División B	1	10th	36	13	7	16	38	44	46	R3			(Spain) Abdón Prats	13
2014–15	3	Segunda División B	1	12th	38	13	10	15	37	40	49		Regional stage	RU	(Spain) Cristian	13
2015–16	3	Segunda División B	1	5th	38	15	13	10	47	39	58				(Spain) Adrián	11
2016–17	3	Segunda División B	1	16th	38	12	9	17	43	54	45	R1	National stage	R16	(Spain) Adrián	11
2016–17	3	Segunda División B	RPO		2	1	1	0	2	1		R1	National stage	R16	(Spain) Adrián	11
2017–18	3	Segunda División B	2	11th	38	12	15	11	28	28	51		Regional stage	C	(Spain) Adrián	9
2017–18	3	Segunda División B	2	11th	38	12	15	11	28	28	51		National stage	R16	(Spain) Adrián	9
2018–19	3	Segunda División B	1	13th	38	12	12	14	28	32	48		Regional stage	RU	(Spain) Asier Goti	7
2019–20	3	Segunda División B	2	8th	28	10	9	9	31	37	39		National stage	R32	(Spain) Asier Barahona (Spain) Gabriel Ortega	7
2020–21	3	Segunda División B	1	1st	24	15	5	4	31	14	50	R2			(Spain) Nacho Heras	17
2020–21	3	Segunda División B	PO		2	2	0	0	2	0		R2			(Spain) Nacho Heras	17
2021–22	2	Segunda División		11th	42	15	10	17	41	41	55	R2			(Spain) Pablo Valcarce	10
2022–23	2	Segunda División		11th	42	13	15	14	33	35	54	R1			(Spain) Curro Sánchez	9
2023–24	2	Segunda División		9th	42	16	11	15	52	54	59	R32			(Spain) Curro Sánchez	12
2024–25	2	Segunda División		12th	42	15	10	17	41	48	55	R2			(Spain) Fer Niño	10
