= List of Burgos CF records and statistics =

This is a list of records and statistics of Burgos CF since its re-foundation in 1994.

== Honours ==
=== National titles ===
- Copa Federación: (1) 1996–97
- Segunda División B: (2) 2000–01 Group 2, 2020–21
- Tercera División Group VIII: (4) 1996–97, 2009–10, 2010–11, 2012–13

=== Regional titles ===
- Copa Federación (Castile and León tournament): (2) 1996–97, 2012–13

== Team statistics ==
=== In Segunda División ===
As of 11 October 2024. Not included playoff matches

- Seasons: 4
- Position in All-time Segunda División table: 85th

Overall
Pld	W	D	L	GF	GA	Pts
168	56	59	60	157	167	220

==== Records ====
- Highest final position: 9th (2023–24)
- Most points in a season: 59 (2023–24)
- Most consecutive seasons in Segunda División: 4 (2021–22 to 2024–25)
- Record home win: 4–0 vs Leganés (2021–22, round 6, 30 September 2001) and 4–0 vs Polideportivo Ejido (2001–02, round 24, 23 January 2022)
- Record away win: 1–5 at Numancia (2001–02, round 16, 25 November 2001)
- Record home loss: 0–4 vs Atlético Madrid (2001–02, round 21, 6 January 2002)
- Record away loss: 5–0 at Real Oviedo (2023–24, round 27, 17 February 2024)

==== Games ====
- First game: 0–1 at Polideportivo Ejido (2001–02, round 1, 25 August 2001)

==== Goals ====
- First goal: José Mari (0–1 at Polideportivo Ejido, 2001–02, round 1, 25 August 2001)
- Youngest goalscorer: Galder Zubizarreta at 21 years and 321 days (1–1 at Córdoba, 2001–02, round 18, 8 December 2001)
- Oldest goalscorer: Ángel Merino at 35 years and 235 days (1–1 at Atlético Madrid, 2001–02, round 42, 25 May 2002)

==== Streaks ====
- Winning: 3 (2001–02, round 4 to 6, 2021–22, round 18 to 20, 2022–23, round 9 to 11 and 2024–25, round 4 to 6)
- Unbeaten: 14 (from round 40 in 2021–22 to round 11 in 2022–23)
- Draws: 4 (2022–23, round 5 to 8)
- Losing: 4 (2001–02, round 38 to 41)
- Games without winning: 11 (2001–02, round 23 to 33)
- Scoring: 5 (2021–22, round 18 to 22 and 2022–23, round 34 to 38)
- Without goals against: 12 (from round 41 in 2021–22 to round 10 in 2022–23)
- Without scoring: 9 (2001–02, round 25 to 33)
- With goals against: 12 (form round 34 in 2023–24 to round 3 in 2024–25)

=== In Segunda División B ===
As of the end of the 2020–21 season. Not included playoff matches

- Seasons: 19

Overall
Pld	W	D	L	GF	GA	Pts
696	272	211	213	759	644	1,027

==== Records ====
- Highest final position: 1st (2000–01 and 2020–21)
- Lowest final position: 20th (2011–12)
- Most points in a season: 72 (2000–01)
- Fewest points in a season: 28 (2011–12)
- Most consecutive seasons in Segunda División B: 8 (2013–14 to 2020–21)
- Fewest consecutive seasons in Segunda División B: 1 (2011–12)
- Record home win: 7–0 vs Gernika (2000–01, round 30, 18 March 2001)
- Record away win: 1–5 at Conquense (1999–2000, round 19, 5 January 2000) and 0–4 at Peña Sport (2000–01, round 7, 12 October 2000) and at Universidad Oviedo (2006–07, round 37, 20 May 2007)
- Record home loss: 1–5 vs Conquense (2003–04, round 28, 7 March 2004)
- Record away loss: 5–0 at Leioa (2019-20, round 18, 22 December 2019)

==== Games ====
- First game: 1–0 at Cultural Leonesa (1997–98, round 1, 31 August 1997)
- 500th game: 0–0 at Lealtad (2015–16, round 8, 10 October 2015)
- Last game: 1–0 vs Celta Vigo B (2020-21, round 24, 9 May 2021)

==== Goals ====
- First goal: José Antonio Catón (2–0 vs Lemona, 1996–97, round 2, 7 September 1997)
- 500th goal: Joaqui (2–2 at Sporting Gijón B, 2013–14, round 19, 21 December 2013)
- Last goal: Claudio Medina (1–0 vs Celta Vigo B, 2020-21, round 24, 9 May 2021)

=== In Tercera División ===
As of the end of the 2012–13 season. Not included playoff matches

- Seasons: 5

Overall
Pld	W	D	L	GF	GA	Pts
188	131	40	17	369	101	433

==== Records ====
- Highest final position: 1st (four times)
- Lowest final position: 3rd (2008–09)
- Most points in a season: 90 (2009–10 and 2012–13)
- Fewest points in a season: 81 (2008–09)
- Most consecutive seasons in Tercera División: 3 (2008–09 to 2010–11)
- Fewest consecutive seasons in Tercera División: 1 (1996–97 and 2012–13)
- Record home win: 7–1 vs Almazán (1996–97, round 28, 9 March 1997) and 6–0 vs Aguilar (2010–11, round 15, 5 December 2010)
- Record away win: 1–6 at Cebrereña (2008–09, round 4, 21 September 2008) and at Villaralbo (2012–13, round 16, 2 December 2012)
- Record home loss: 0–2 vs Palencia (1996–97, round 8, 20 October 1996) and 1–3 vs Gimnástica Segoviana (2010–11, round 30, 20 March 2011)
- Record away loss: 3–0 at Valladolid B (2009–10, round 2, 6 September 2009)

==== Games ====
- First game: 0–2 at Gimnástica Segoviana (1996–97, round 1, 1 September 1996)
- Last game: 4–0 vs Salamanca B (2012–13, round 38, 19 May 2013)

=== In Copa del Rey ===
As of 7 January 2024

- Editions: 18

Overall
Pld	W	D	L	GF	GA
41	18	5	18	44	45

==== Records ====
- Furthest round: Round of 32 (2007–08 and 2023–24)
- Record home win: 3–1 and 2–0 (five times)
- Record away win: 0–3 at Tuilla (2013–14, round 2, 11 September 2003)
- Record home loss: 0–3 vs Mallorca (2023–24, round of 32, 7 January 2024)
- Record away loss: 4–1 at Getafe (2007–08, round of 32, 2 January 2008)

==== Games ====
- First game: 1–0 vs Logroñés (1996–97, round 1, 3 September 1997)
- Last game: 0–3 vs Mallorca (2023–24, round of 32, 7 January 2024)
