= 2001–02 Copa Federación de España =

Tournament details
- Country: Spain
- Teams: 32 (in the National stage)

Final positions
- Champions: Celta Vigo B
- Runners-up: Gavà

The 2001–02 Copa Federación de España was the ninth staging of the Copa Federación de España, a knockout competition for Spanish football clubs in Segunda División B and Tercera División.

The Regional stages began in 2001, while the national tournament took place during the 2001–02 season.

== Regional tournaments ==
=== Asturias tournament ===
==== Group A ====
Pos	Team	Pld	W	D	L	GF	GA	GD	Pts	Qualification
1	Avilés	4	3	0	1	6	3	+3	9	Qualification to semifinals
2	Oviedo B	4	3	0	1	7	4	+3	9	
3	Llanes	4	0	0	4	2	8	−6	0	

Source: Royal Asturian Football Federation
Rules for classification: 1) Points; 2) Head-to-head results; 3) Goal difference; 4) Number of goals scored

==== Group B ====
Pos	Team	Pld	W	D	L	GF	GA	GD	Pts	Qualification
1	Lealtad	4	1	3	0	5	4	+1	6	Qualification to semifinals
2	Universidad Oviedo	4	1	3	0	5	4	+1	6	
3	Navia	4	0	2	2	6	8	−2	2	

Source: Royal Asturian Football Federation
Rules for classification: 1) Points; 2) Head-to-head results; 3) Goal difference; 4) Number of goals scored

Note: As Lealtad and Universidad Oviedo finished in a total draw, a replay match in a neutral venue was played. Lealtad won 2–1.

==== Group C ====
Pos	Team	Pld	W	D	L	GF	GA	GD	Pts	Qualification
1	Sporting Gijón B	4	2	1	1	7	2	+5	7	Qualification to semifinals
2	Astur	4	2	0	2	3	7	−4	6	
3	Titánico	4	1	1	2	3	4	−1	4	

Source: Royal Asturian Football Federation
Rules for classification: 1) Points; 2) Head-to-head results; 3) Goal difference; 4) Number of goals scored

==== Group D ====
Pos	Team	Pld	W	D	L	GF	GA	GD	Pts	Qualification
1	Langreo	4	3	1	0	7	4	+3	10	Qualification to semifinals
2	San Martín	4	2	0	2	3	3	0	6	
3	Siero	4	0	1	3	3	6	−3	1	

Source: Royal Asturian Football Federation
Rules for classification: 1) Points; 2) Head-to-head results; 3) Goal difference; 4) Number of goals scored

==== Final bracket ====
Semi-finals
Avilés	3	1	4
Lealtad	1	0	1
Sporting Gijón B	1	0	1
Langreo (a)	1	0	1

Final
Avilés	2
Langreo	0

=== Castile and León tournament ===
Pos	Team	Pld	W	D	L	GF	GA	GD	Pts	Qualification	TOR	BAÑ	BEJ
1	Atlético Tordesillas	2	2	0	0	5	1	+4	6	Winner	—	—	2–0
2	La Bañeza	2	1	0	1	3	3	0	3		1–3	—	—
3	Béjar Industrial	2	0	0	2	0	4	−4	0		—	0–2	—

Source: FCyLF.es
Rules for classification: 1) Points; 2) Head-to-head results; 3) Goal difference; 4) Number of goals scored

== National tournament ==
=== Round of 32 ===
Team 1	Agg.	Team 2	1st leg	2nd leg
Avilés (Asturias)	4–0	(Asturias) Marino Luanco	0–0	4–0
Celta B (Galicia (Spain))	4–2	(Galicia (Spain)) Endesa As Pontes	3–2	1–0
Beasain (Basque Country (autonomous community))	4–3	(La Rioja) Calahorra	2–0	2–3
Tropezón (Cantabria)	2–4	(Cantabria) Noja	1–2	1–2
Gavà (Catalonia)	2–2 (a)	(Catalonia) Palamós	1–0	1–2
Teruel (Aragon)	3–3 (a)	(Aragon) Huesca	2–2	1–1
Zamora (Castile and León)	4–4 (a)	(La Rioja) Alfaro	4–1	0–3
Atlético Tordesillas (Castile and León)	0–3	(Castile and León) Palencia	0–1	0–2
Rayo Majadahonda (Community of Madrid)	7–5	(Castilla–La Mancha) Talavera	4–3	3–2
Tenisca (Canary Islands)	2–2 (a)	(Community of Madrid) Santa Ana	2–1	0–1
Binissalem (Balearic Islands)	0–5	(Valencian Community) Castellón	0–0	0–5
Atlético Baleares (Balearic Islands)	2–1	(Valencian Community) Alzira	1–0	1–1
Granada (Andalusia)	2–3	(Castilla–La Mancha) Quintanar del Rey	1–1	1–2
Torredonjimeno (Andalusia)	3–1	(Region of Murcia) Lorca	0–0	3–1
San José (Andalusia)	2–2 (a)	(Extremadura) Jerez	1–0	1–2
Marbella (Andalusia)	5–2	(Andalusia) Atlético Lucentino	3–1	2–1

=== Round of 16 ===
Team 1	Agg.	Team 2	1st leg	2nd leg
Palencia (Castile and León)	4–5	(Galicia (Spain)) Celta Vigo B	4–2	0–3
Avilés (Asturias)	1–4	(Cantabria) Noja	0–2	1–2
Beasain (Basque Country (autonomous community))	3–6	(La Rioja) Alfaro	2–1	1–5
Huesca (Aragon)	0–2	(Catalonia) Gavà	0–2	0–0
Santa Ana (Community of Madrid)	1–3	(Valencian Community) Castellón	0–0	1–3
Atlético Baleares (Balearic Islands)	3–2	(Community of Madrid) Rayo Majadahonda	3–2	0–0
San José (Andalusia)	2–1	(Castilla–La Mancha) Quintanar del Rey	1–1	1–0
Torredonjimeno (Andalusia)	1–4	(Andalusia) Marbella	1–0	0–4

=== Quarter-finals ===
Team 1	Agg.	Team 2	1st leg	2nd leg
Celta Vigo B (Galicia (Spain))	4–4 (a)	(La Rioja) Alfaro	1–2	3–2
Noja (Cantabria)	1–3	(Catalonia) Gavà	0–0	1–3
Marbella (Andalusia)	2–2 (a)	(Valencian Community) Castellón	0–0	2–2
Atlético Baleares (Balearic Islands)	4–3	(Andalusia) San José	3–3	1–0

=== Semifinals ===
Team 1	Agg.	Team 2	1st leg	2nd leg
Atlético Baleares (Balearic Islands)	2–3	(Galicia (Spain)) Celta Vigo B	2–0	0–3
Marbella (Andalusia)	6–7	(Catalonia) Gavà	3–4	3–3

=== Final ===
Team 1	Agg.	Team 2	1st leg	2nd leg
Celta Vigo B (Galicia (Spain))	3–1	(Catalonia) Gavà	1–0	2–1
