= 2004–05 Copa Federación de España =

Tournament details
- Country: Spain

Final positions
- Champions: Mataró
- Runner-up: Benidorm

The 2004–05 Copa Federación de España was the 12th staging of the Copa Federación de España. It is a knockout competition for Spanish football clubs in Segunda División B and Tercera División.

The competition began in August 2005 with the Regional stages, and ended with the finals on 13 and 27 April 2005.

== Autonomous Communities tournaments ==
=== Asturias tournament ===
==== Qualifying tournament ====
===== Group A =====
Team	Pld	W	D	L	GF	GA	GD	Pts
Universidad	4	2	1	1	7	2	+5	7
Avilés Industrial	4	1	2	1	2	6	–4	5
Ceares	4	1	1	2	3	4	–1	4

	Avi	Cea	Uni
Avilés		1–1	0–5
Ceares	0–1		1–0
Universidad	0–0	2–1	

===== Group B =====
Team	Pld	W	D	L	GF	GA	GD	Pts
Oviedo ACF	4	2	2	0	2	0	+2	8
Langreo	4	2	1	1	4	2	+2	7
Gijón Industrial	4	0	1	3	1	5	–4	1

	Ind	Lan	ACF
Gijón Industrial		1–2	0–0
UP Langreo	2–1		0–0
Oviedo ACF	1–0	1–0	

===== Group C =====
Team	Pld	W	D	L	GF	GA	GD	Pts
Marino	4	3	1	0	7	3	+4	10
Caudal	4	1	1	2	4	4	0	4
Titánico	4	0	2	2	4	7	–3	2

	Cau	Mar	Tit
Caudal		0–1	2–0
Marino	2–1		2–1
Titánico	1–1	2–2	

===== Group D =====
Team	Pld	W	D	L	GF	GA	GD	Pts
Sporting B	4	2	1	1	4	5	–1	7
Ribadesella	4	1	3	0	4	1	+3	6
Lealtad	4	0	2	2	1	3	–2	2

	Lea	Rib	SpB
Lealtad		0–0	0–1
Ribadesella	0–0		3–0
Sporting B	2–1	1–1	

==== Semifinals ====
Team 1	Agg.	Team 2	1st leg	2nd leg
Universidad	4–6	Oviedo ACF	3–1	1–5
Marino	3–1	Sporting B	2–1	1–0

==== Final ====
Team 1	Score	Team 2
Oviedo ACF	1–1 (4–5 p)	Marino

=== Castile and León tournament ===
==== Final ====
Team 1	Agg.	Team 2	1st leg	2nd leg
Ponferrada Promesas	3–0	La Bañeza	1–0	2–0

=== Navarre tournament ===
Team 1	Agg.	Team 2	1st leg	2nd leg
Izarra	5–2	Oberena	3–1	2–1

== National tournament ==
=== National Qualifying round ===
Team 1	Agg.	Team 2	1st leg	2nd leg
Oviedo (Asturias)	4–3	(Castile and León) Ponferrada Promesas	2–2	2–1
Ponferradina (Castile and León)	2–4	(Galicia (Spain)) Celta B	1–3	1–1
Marino (Asturias)	2–3	(Cantabria) Noja	1–0	1–3
CE Mataró (Catalonia)	3–1	(Navarre) CD Izarra	3–0	0–1
Utebo FC (Aragon)	2–1	(Basque Country (autonomous community)) Aurrerá	1–1	1–0
CF Badalona (Catalonia)	3–3 (p)	(La Rioja) Calahorra	2–1	1–2
Benicàssim (Valencian Community)	1–6	(Balearic Islands) Poblense	1–2	0–4
Alcázar (Castilla–La Mancha)	5–4	(Balearic Islands) Peña Deportiva	4–2	1–2
Quintanar del Rey (Valencian Community)	2–5	(Region of Murcia) Mar Menor	2–0	0–5
Navalcarnero (Community of Madrid)	2–1	(Extremadura) Mérida	2–1	0–0
Pájara Playas (Canary Islands)	0–2	(Canary Islands) Laguna	0–1	0–1
Marbella (Andalusia)	(w.o.)	(Community of Madrid) Móstoles		

=== Round of 16 ===
Team 1	Agg.	Team 2	1st leg	2nd leg
Oviedo (Asturias)	8–2	(Cantabria) Noja	5–0	3–2
Celta B (Galicia (Spain))	2–2 (a)	(Cantabria) Velarde	2–1	0–1
Calahorra (La Rioja)	2–2 (a)	(Aragon) Utebo	1–0	1–2
Mataró (Catalonia)	3–2	(Aragon) Huesca	3–1	0–1
Villanueva (Andalusia)	3–3 (p)	(Canary Islands) Laguna	2–1	1–2
Navalcarnero (Community of Madrid)	5–5 (a)	(Andalusia) Marbella	2–1	3–4
Alcázar (Castilla–La Mancha)	0–4	(Valencian Community) Benidorm	0–1	0–3
Poblense (Balearic Islands)	5–5 (a)	(Region of Murcia) Mar Menor	3–1	2–4 (a.e.t.)

=== Quarter-finals ===
Team 1	Agg.	Team 2	1st leg	2nd leg
Calahorra (La Rioja)	2–3	(Asturias) Oviedo	2–0	0–3 (a.e.t.)
Velarde (Cantabria)	2–6	(Catalonia) Mataró	2–3	0–3
Benidorm (Valencian Community)	5–1	(Balearic Islands) Poblense	4–0	1–1
Laguna (Canary Islands)	2–2 (a)	(Community of Madrid) Navalcarnero	1–0	1–2

=== Semifinals ===
Team 1	Agg.	Team 2	1st leg	2nd leg
Benidorm (Valencian Community)	2–1	(Asturias) Oviedo	1–1	1–0
Laguna (Canary Islands)	3–3 (p)	(Catalonia) Mataró	1–2	2–1

=== Final ===
Team 1	Agg.	Team 2	1st leg	2nd leg
Benidorm (Valencian Community)	2–2 (a)	(Catalonia) Mataró	2–1	0–1
