= 2003–04 Copa Federación de España =

Tournament details
- Country: Spain

Final positions
- Champions: Badalona
- Runners-up: Villanueva

The 2003–04 Copa Federación de España was the 11th staging of the Copa Federación de España, a knockout competition for Spanish football clubs in Segunda División B and Tercera División.

The competition began in August 2004 with the Regional stages and ended with the finals on 1 and 14 April 2004.

== Regional tournaments ==
=== Asturias tournament ===
==== Preliminary round ====
===== Group A =====
Pos	Team	Pld	W	D	L	GF	GA	GD	Pts	Qualification	LEA	AST	MAR
1	Lealtad	4	2	1	1	3	1	+2	7	Qualification to semifinals	—	0–0	1–0
2	Astur	4	1	2	1	2	2	0	5		0–2	—	0–0
3	Ribadesella	4	1	1	2	1	3	−2	4		1–0	0–2	—

Source: Marino Luanco
Rules for classification: 1) Points; 2) Head-to-head results; 3) Goal difference; 4) Number of goals scored

===== Group B =====
Pos	Team	Pld	W	D	L	GF	GA	GD	Pts	Qualification	SIE	MAR	MAR
1	Siero	4	2	1	1	5	4	+1	7	Qualification to semifinals	—	2–2	2–0
2	Marino Luanco	4	2	1	1	9	4	+5	7		0–1	—	5–1
3	Titánico	4	1	0	3	3	9	−6	3		2–0	0–2	—

Source: Marino Luanco
Rules for classification: 1) Points; 2) Head-to-head results; 3) Goal difference; 4) Number of goals scored

===== Group C =====
Pos	Team	Pld	W	D	L	GF	GA	GD	Pts	Qualification	LAN	GIJ	MAR
1	Langreo	4	2	1	1	4	5	−1	7	Qualification to semifinals	—	2–1	1–0
2	Gijón Industrial	4	2	1	1	4	2	+2	7		0–0	—	1–0
3	Llanes	4	1	0	3	4	5	−1	3		4–1	0–2	—

Source: Marino Luanco
Rules for classification: 1) Points; 2) Head-to-head results; 3) Goal difference; 4) Number of goals scored

===== Group D =====
Pos	Team	Pld	W	D	L	GF	GA	GD	Pts	Qualification	SPO	UNI	MAR
1	Sporting Gijón B	4	3	0	1	10	2	+8	9	Qualification to semifinals	—	2–0	3–0
2	Universidad de Oviedo	4	3	0	1	9	4	+5	9		2–0	—	4–0
3	Hispano	4	0	0	4	2	15	−13	0		0–5	2–3	—

Source: Marino Luanco
Rules for classification: 1) Points; 2) Head-to-head results; 3) Goal difference; 4) Number of goals scored

==== Final bracket ====
Semi-finals
11 and 25 September
Lealtad	2	1	3
Siero	1	0	1
11 and 25 September
Langreo	0	1	1
Sporting Gijón B	1	1	2

Final
Luanco – 9 October
Lealtad	0
Sporting Gijón B	1

=== Castile and León tournament ===
==== Final ====
Team 1	Agg.	Team 2	1st leg	2nd leg
La Bañeza	1–6	Guijuelo	1–2	0–4

== National tournament ==
=== Round of 32 ===
Team 1	Agg.	Team 2	1st leg	2nd leg
Celta B (Galicia (Spain))	1–1 (p)	(Asturias) Real Avilés	1–0	0–1
Caudal (Asturias)	2–3	(Galicia (Spain)) Cerceda	2–1	0–2
Sporting B (Asturias)	3–3 (a)	(Cantabria) Velarde	2–0	1–3
Racing B (Cantabria)	3–4	(Castile and León) Palencia	2–1	1–3
Peralta (Navarre)	1–4	(La Rioja) Logroñés	0–1	1–3
Zalla (Basque Country (autonomous community))	1–3	(Basque Country (autonomous community)) Amurrio	0–1	1–2
Badalona (Catalonia)	3–1	(Aragon) Fraga	1–1	2–0
Gavà (Catalonia)	1–2	(Aragon) Zaragoza B	0–2	1–0
Pinatar (Region of Murcia)	0–5	(Castilla–La Mancha) Hellín	0–3	0–2
Benidorm (Valencian Community)	0–0 (p)	(Valencian Community) Levante B	0–0	0–0
Alcorcón (Community of Madrid)	6–1	(Community of Madrid) Orcasita	6–1	0–0
Manchego (Castilla–La Mancha)	3–2	(Castile and León) Guijuelo	2–2	1–0
Granada (Andalusia)	2–0	(Extremadura) Don Benito	1–0	1–0
Tenerife B (Canary Islands)	1–1 (p)	(Balearic Islands) Vilafranca	1–0	0–1
Universidad Las Palmas (Canary Islands)	6–3	(Balearic Islands) Manacor	4–1	2–2
Villanueva (Andalusia)	(w.o.)	Extremadura		

=== Round of 16 ===
Team 1	Agg.	Team 2	1st leg	2nd leg
Cerceda (Galicia (Spain))	6–0	(Asturias) Real Avilés	2–0	4–0
Sporting B (Asturias)	1–0	(Castile and León) Palencia	1–0	0–0
Amurrio (Basque Country (autonomous community))	0–2	(La Rioja) Logroñés	0–1	0–1
Zaragoza B (Aragon)	1–4	(Catalonia) Badalona	1–0	0–4
Granada (Andalusia)	1–2	(Valencian Community) Benidorm	0–1	1–1
Villanueva (Andalusia)	3–1	(Castilla–La Mancha) Hellín	1–1	2–0
Universidad Las Palmas (Canary Islands)	2–1	(Community of Madrid) Alcorcón	2–0	0–1
Manchego (Castilla–La Mancha)	2–2 (a)	(Canary Islands) Tenerife B	1–0	1–2

=== Quarter-finals ===
Team 1	Agg.	Team 2	1st leg	2nd leg
Cerceda (Galicia (Spain))	1–0	(Asturias) Sporting B	1–0	0–0
Badalona (Catalonia)	3–2	(La Rioja) Logroñés	3–2	0–0
Universidad Las Palmas (Canary Islands)	2–2 (p)	(Valencian Community) Benidorm	1–1	1–1
Manchego (Castilla–La Mancha)	0–3	(Andalusia) Villanueva	0–1	0–2

=== Semifinals ===
Team 1	Agg.	Team 2	1st leg	2nd leg
Villanueva (Andalusia)	3–2	(Galicia (Spain)) Cerceda	1–1	2–1
Benidorm (Valencian Community)	1–2 (o.t.)	(Catalonia) Badalona	0–1	1–1

=== Final ===
Team 1	Agg.	Team 2	1st leg	2nd leg
Villanueva (Andalusia)	1–4	(Catalonia) Badalona	0–0	1–4
