= Jaime Jordán de Urríes =

Spanish footballer

Jaime
Personal information
- Full name: Jaime Jordán de Urríes Fernández
- Date of birth: 2 February 1977 (age 49)
- Place of birth: Oviedo, Spain
- Height: 1.72 m (5 ft 7 1/2 in)
- Position: Midfielder

Youth career
- Oviedo

Senior career*
Years	Team	Apps	(Gls)
1995–1997	Oviedo B	73	(5)
1997–2003	Oviedo	134	(13)
2003–2005	Salamanca	59	(5)
2005–2007	Eibar	32	(1)
2007–2008	Astur	37	(3)
2008–2009	Marino	28	(7)
Total		363	(34)

International career
1998–1999	Spain U21	2	(0)
- * Club domestic league appearances and goals

Jaime Jordán de Urríes Fernández (born 2 February 1977 in Oviedo, Asturias), known as simply Jaime, is a Spanish former footballer who played as a midfielder.
