= 2005–06 Copa Federación de España =

Tournament details
- Country: Spain

Final positions
- Champions: Puertollano
- Runner-up: Huesca

The 2005–06 Copa Federación de España was the 13th staging of the Copa Federación de España, a knockout competition for Spanish football clubs in Segunda División B and Tercera División.

The competition began in August 2006 with the Regional stages and ended with the finals on 5 and 19 April 2006.

== Autonomous Communities tournaments ==
=== Asturias tournament ===
==== Qualifying tournament ====
===== Group A =====
Team	Pld	W	D	L	GF	GA	GD	Pts
Siero	4	2	1	1	3	2	+1	7
Marino	4	1	2	1	6	5	+1	5
Avilés	4	0	3	1	4	5	–1	3

	Avi	Mar	Sie
Avilés		2–2	0–0
Marino	2–2		1–0
Siero	1–0	2–1	

===== Group B =====
Team	Pld	W	D	L	GF	GA	GD	Pts
Oviedo ACF	4	3	0	1	5	4	+1	9
Sporting B	4	2	1	1	6	4	+2	7
Mosconia	4	0	1	3	3	6	–3	1

	Mos	ACF	SpB
Mosconia		1–2	1–0
Oviedo ACF	1–0		0–2
Sporting B	2–2	2–1	

===== Group C =====
Team	Pld	W	D	L	GF	GA	GD	Pts
Caudal	4	2	1	1	4	2	+2	7
Ribadesella	4	1	2	1	2	1	+1	5
Lealtad	4	1	1	2	2	5	–3	4

	Cau	Lea	Rib
Caudal		2–0	0–0
Lealtad	0–3		2–0
Ribadesella	1–0	0–0	

===== Group D =====
Team	Pld	W	D	L	GF	GA	GD	Pts
Universidad	4	2	1	1	5	5	0	7
Ceares	4	1	3	0	4	2	+2	6
Langreo	4	0	2	2	3	5	–2	2

	Cea	Lan	Uni
Ceares		0–0	2–0
Langreo	1–1		1–2
Universidad de Oviedo	1–1	2–1	

==== Semifinals ====
Team 1	Agg.	Team 2	1st leg	2nd leg
Siero	2–5	Oviedo ACF	2–3	0–2
Caudal	8–2	Universidad	5–1	3–1

==== Final ====
Team 1	Score	Team 2
Oviedo ACF	0–2	Caudal

=== Castile and León tournament ===
Pos	Team	Pld	W	D	L	GF	GA	GD	Pts	Qualification	GUI	BAÑ	MIR
1	Guijuelo	2	1	1	0	3	2	+1	4	Winner	—	3–2	—
2	La Bañeza	2	1	0	1	4	3	+1	3		—	—	2–0
3	Mirandés	2	0	1	1	0	2	−2	1		0–0	—	—

Source: FCyLF.es
Rules for classification: 1) Points; 2) Head-to-head results; 3) Goal difference; 4) Number of goals scored

=== Navarre tournament ===
Team 1	Agg.	Team 2	1st leg	2nd leg
Burladés	3–1	Iruña	2–1	1–0

== National tournament ==
=== National Qualifying round ===
Team 1	Agg.	Team 2	1st leg	2nd leg
Haro (La Rioja)	3–3	(La Rioja) Calahorra	2–2	1–1
Villanueva (Andalusia)	0–6	(Castilla–La Mancha) Puertollano	0–3	0–3
Rápido de Bouzas (Galicia (Spain))	2–3	(Galicia (Spain)) Coruxo	1–2	1–1

=== Round of 32 ===
Team 1	Agg.	Team 2	1st leg	2nd leg
Coruxo (Galicia (Spain))	1–3	(Galicia (Spain)) Ourense	0–1	1–2
Guijuelo (Castile and León)	6–5	(Castile and León) Ponferradina	5–2	1–3
Caudal (Asturias)	1–1	(Cantabria) Racing B	1–1	0–0
Escobedo (Cantabria)	1–4	(La Rioja) Calahorra	0–3	1–1
Barakaldo (Basque Country (autonomous community))	3–1	(Navarre) Burladés	1–0	2–1
Valle de Egüés (Navarre)	1–3	(Basque Country (autonomous community)) Indautxu	1–1	0–2
Huesca (Aragon)	4–1	(Catalonia) Mataró	1–0	0–4
Barbastro (Aragon)	0–3	(Catalonia) Sabadell	0–0	0–3
Mar Menor (Region of Murcia)	2–3	(Castilla–La Mancha) Conquense	1–2	1–1
Elche Ilicitano (Valencian Community)	3–5	(Valencian Community) Gandía	3–1	0–4
Leganés (Community of Madrid)	2–1	(Community of Madrid) Las Rozas	1–1	1–0
Rayo Vallecano B (Community of Madrid)	1–3	(Castilla–La Mancha) Puertollano	0–2	1–1
Algeciras (Andalusia)	1–1	(Andalusia) Jaén	1–1	0–0
Don Benito (Extremadura)	2–3	(Andalusia) Marbella	2–0	0–3
Laguna (Canary Islands)	3–2	(Balearic Islands) Constància	3–0	0–2
Mallorca B (Balearic Islands)	0–5	(Canary Islands) Universidad Las Palmas	0–0	0–5

=== Round of 16 ===
Team 1	Agg.	Team 2	1st leg	2nd leg
Guijuelo (Castile and León)	3–3	(La Rioja) Calahorra	0–2	1–3
Ourense (Galicia (Spain))	5–0	(Cantabria) Racing B	4–0	1–0
Huesca (Aragon)	4–1	(Basque Country (autonomous community)) Indautxu	1–0	3–1
Barakaldo (Basque Country (autonomous community))	1–6	(Catalonia) Sabadell	0–5	1–1
Laguna (Canary Islands)	2–4	(Canary Islands) Universidad Las Palmas	2–1	0–3
Leganés (Community of Madrid)	4–3	(Castilla–La Mancha) Conquense	0–0	4–3
Jaén (Andalusia)	0–4	(Andalusia) Marbella	0–0	0–4
Puertollano (Castilla–La Mancha)	2–1	(Valencian Community) Gandía	2–0	0–1

=== Quarter-finals ===
Team 1	Agg.	Team 2	1st leg	2nd leg
Ourense (Galicia (Spain))	3–0	(Castile and León) Guijuelo	1–0	2–0
Sabadell (Catalonia)	0–2	(Aragon) Huesca	0–1	0–1
Puertollano (Castilla–La Mancha)	5–1	(Andalusia) Marbella	2–1	3–0
Universidad Las Palmas (Canary Islands)	3–5	(Community of Madrid) Leganés	2–3	1–2

=== Semifinals ===
Team 1	Agg.	Team 2	1st leg	2nd leg
Huesca (Aragon)	4–3	(Galicia (Spain)) Ourense	4–2	0–1
Leganés (Community of Madrid)	1–2	(Castilla–La Mancha) Puertollano	1–1	0–1

=== Final ===
Team 1	Agg.	Team 2	1st leg	2nd leg
Huesca (Aragon)	1–3	(Castilla–La Mancha) Puertollano	1–1	0-2
