= 2006–07 Copa Federación de España =

Tournament details
- Country: Spain

Final positions
- Champions: Pontevedra
- Runner-up: Mallorca B

The 2006–07 Copa Federación de España is the 14th staging of the Copa Federación de España, a knockout competition for Spanish football clubs in Segunda División B and Tercera División.

The competition began in August 2006 with the Regional stages and ended with the finals on 11 and 18 April 2007.

== Autonomous Communities tournaments ==
=== Asturias tournament ===
==== Qualifying tournament ====
===== Group A =====
Team	Pld	W	D	L	GF	GA	GD	Pts
Sporting B	4	2	1	1	7	3	+4	7
Navarro	4	2	0	2	4	5	–1	6
Ribadesella	4	1	1	2	2	5	–3	4

	Nav	Rib	SpB
Navarro		1–0	2–1
Ribadesella	1–0		1–1
Sporting B	3–1	2–0	

===== Group B =====
Team	Pld	W	D	L	GF	GA	GD	Pts
Siero	4	2	1	1	5	5	+0	7
Caudal	4	2	1	1	5	3	+2	7
Lealtad	4	1	0	3	5	7	–2	3

	Cau	Lea	Sie
Caudal		3–1	1–1
Lealtad	0–1		4–1
Siero	1–0	2–0	

===== Group C =====
Team	Pld	W	D	L	GF	GA	GD	Pts
Langreo	4	4	0	0	8	1	+7	12
Covadonga	4	1	0	3	4	7	–3	3
Oviedo ACF	4	1	0	3	3	7	–4	3

	Cov	Lan	ACF
Covadonga		0–2	1–0
Langreo	2–1		1–0
Oviedo ACF	2–1	0–3	

===== Group D =====
Team	Pld	W	D	L	GF	GA	GD	Pts
Marino	4	2	2	0	8	0	+8	8
Avilés	4	2	2	0	3	0	+3	8
Mosconia	4	0	0	4	0	11	–11	0

	Avi	Mar	Mos
Avilés		0–0	1–0
Marino	0–0		6–0
Mosconia	0–2	0–2	

==== Semifinals ====
Team 1	Agg.	Team 2	1st leg	2nd leg
Sporting B	4–3	Siero	2–2	2–1
UP Langreo	4–5	Marino	0–4	4–1

==== Final ====
Team 1	Score	Team 2
Sporting B	1–1 (4–5 p)	Marino

=== Castile and León tournament ===
==== Group A ====
Pos	Team	Pld	W	D	L	GF	GA	GD	Pts	Qualification	GUI	HUR	BAÑ
1	Guijuelo	2	2	0	0	3	1	+2	6	Qualification to the final	—	—	1–0
2	Huracán Z	2	0	1	1	2	3	−1	1		1–2	—	—
3	La Bañeza	2	0	1	1	1	2	−1	1		—	1–1	—

Source: FCyLF.es
Rules for classification: 1) Points; 2) Head-to-head results; 3) Goal difference; 4) Number of goals scored

==== Group B ====
Pos	Team	Pld	W	D	L	GF	GA	GD	Pts	Qualification	ARA	MIR	LAG
1	Arandina	2	2	0	0	3	0	+3	6	Qualification to the final	—	1–0	—
2	Mirandés	2	1	0	1	2	1	+1	3		—	—	2–0
3	Laguna	2	0	0	2	0	4	−4	0		0–2	—	—

Source: FCyLF.es
Rules for classification: 1) Points; 2) Head-to-head results; 3) Goal difference; 4) Number of goals scored

==== Final ====
Team 1	Agg.	Team 2	1st leg	2nd leg
Guijuelo	3–1	Arandina	1–0	2–1

=== Navarre tournament ===
==== Semifinals ====
Team 1	Agg.	Team 2	1st leg	2nd leg
Ardoi	2–1	Mutilvera	1–1	1–0
Oberena	1–2	Valle de Egüés	1–2	0–0

==== Final ====
Team 1	Score	Team 2
Valle de Egüés	1–3	Ardoi

== National tournament ==
=== National Qualifying round ===
Team 1	Agg.	Team 2	1st leg	2nd leg
Villanueva (Andalusia)	1–6	(Castilla–La Mancha) Puertollano	1–5	0–1
Oviedo (Asturias)	4–2	(Asturias) Universidad Oviedo	3–0	1–2

=== Round of 32 ===
Team 1	Agg.	Team 2	1st leg	2nd leg
Pontevedra (Galicia (Spain))	3–0	(Asturias) Marino	2–0	1–0
Celta B (Galicia (Spain))	4–6	(Asturias) Oviedo	4–4	0–2
Amurrio (Basque Country (autonomous community))	4–0	(Basque Country (autonomous community)) Oyonesa	4–0	0–0
Gimnástica Torrelavega (Cantabria)	2–3	(La Rioja) Fundación Logroñés	1–2	1–1
Racing B (Cantabria)	11–0	(Navarre) Ardoi	4–0	7–0
Mallorca B (Balearic Islands)	4–1	(Catalonia) Sabadell	3–0	1–1
Girona (Catalonia)	4–4 (a)	(Catalonia) Terrassa	3–3	1–1
Real Zaragoza B (Aragon)	2–5	(Catalonia) Sant Andreu	2–2	0–3
Don Benito (Extremadura)	1–3	(Community of Madrid) Rayo Vallecano B	1–0	0–3
Puertollano (Castilla–La Mancha)	2–2 (1–4 p)	(Community of Madrid) Parla	2–0	0–2
Guijuelo (Castile and León)	7–2	(Extremadura) Villanovense	3–1	4–1
Mazarrón (Region of Murcia)	4–3	(Castilla–La Mancha) Almansa	1–2	3–1
Alicante (Valencian Community)	2–1	(Valencian Community) Eldense	2–1	0–0
Villajoyosa (Valencian Community)	1–2	(Valencian Community) Ontinyent	1–2	0–0
Tenerife B (Canary Islands)	1–2	(Canary Islands) Fuerteventura	1–1	0–1
Marbella (Andalusia)	1–4	(Andalusia) Granada	1–2	0–2

=== Round of 16 ===
Team 1	Agg.	Team 2	1st leg	2nd leg
Racing B (Cantabria)	3–1	(Asturias) Oviedo	1–1	2–0
Pontevedra (Galicia (Spain))	5–0	(Basque Country (autonomous community)) Amurrio	1–0	4–0
Terrassa (Catalonia)	2–4	(Balearic Islands) Mallorca B	1–2	1–2
ADF Logroñés (La Rioja)	2–5	(Catalonia) Sant Andreu	0–1	2–4
Guijuelo (Castile and León)	2–1	(Community of Madrid) Rayo Vallecano B	1–0	1–1
Parla (Community of Madrid)	0–1	(Canary Islands) Fuerteventura	0–0	0–1
Granada (Andalusia)	1–2	(Valencian Community) Ontinyent	1–1	0–1
Mazarrón (Region of Murcia)	1–4	(Valencian Community) Alicante	1–2	0–2

=== Quarter-finals ===
Team 1	Agg.	Team 2	1st leg	2nd leg
Fuerteventura (Canary Islands)	4–5	(Cantabria) Racing B	0–3	4–2
Guijuelo (Castile and León)	2–2 (a)	(Galicia (Spain)) Pontevedra	2–1	0–1
Sant Andreu (Catalonia)	3–3 (a)	(Valencian Community) Ontinyent	3–1	0–2
Mallorca B (Balearic Islands)	3–2	(Valencian Community) Alicante	2–1	1–1

=== Semifinals ===
Team 1	Agg.	Team 2	1st leg	2nd leg
Pontevedra (Galicia (Spain))	4–3	(Valencian Community) Ontinyent	3–2	1–1
Racing B (Cantabria)	1–2	(Balearic Islands) Mallorca B	1–0	0–2

=== Final ===
Team 1	Agg.	Team 2	1st leg	2nd leg
Pontevedra (Galicia (Spain))	4–2	(Balearic Islands) Mallorca B	4–1	0-1
