= 1997–98 Copa Federación de España =

Tournament details
- Country: Spain
- Teams: 18

Final positions
- Champions: Binéfar
- Runners-up: Alcalá

The 1997–98 Copa Federación de España was the fifth staging of the Copa Federación de España, a knockout competition for Spanish football clubs in Segunda División B and Tercera División.

The Regional stages began in 1997, while the national tournament took place from November 1997 to April 1998.

== Regional tournaments ==
=== Asturias tournament ===
First round
Turón	2	1	3
Oviedo B	2	2	4
Universidad Oviedo (a.e.t.)	2	2	4
Marino Luanco	1	2	3
Pumarín	2	0	2
Langreo(a.e.t.)	0	3	3
San Martín	1	0	1
Avilés	4	3	7

Quarter-finals
Oviedo B	0	0	0
Universidad de Oviedo	4	2	6
Langreo	2	2	4
Avilés	0	1	1
Navia	1	0	1
Sporting Gijón B	3	5	8
Siero	3	2	5
Lealtad	1	2	3

Semi-finals
Universidad de Oviedo	0	0	0
Langreo	2	1	3
Sporting Gijón B	2	2	4
CD Lealtad	1	4	5

Final
Langreo	0	3	3
Lealtad	0	0	0

=== Castile and León tournament ===
Team 1	Agg.	Team 2	1st leg	2nd leg
Palencia	1–4	Cultural Leonesa	1–0	0–4

== National tournament ==
=== Preliminary round ===
Team 1	Agg.	Team 2	1st leg	2nd leg
Gáldar (Canary Islands)	3–2	(Canary Islands) Corralejo	2–1	1–1
Calahorra (La Rioja)	2–3	(Basque Country (autonomous community)) Elgoibar	1–0	1–3

=== Round of 16 ===
Team 1	Agg.	Team 2	1st leg	2nd leg
Constància (Balearic Islands)	4–5	(Canary Islands) Gáldar	2–2	2–3
Ceuta	2–1	(Andalusia) Guadix	1–0	1–1
Villarrobledo (Castilla–La Mancha)	0–1	(Community of Madrid) Alcalá	0–1	0–0
Cacereño (Extremadura)	1–1 (a)	(Castile and León) Cultural Leonesa	0–0	1–1
Alcoyano (Valencian Community)	3–3 (p)	(Region of Murcia) Cartagonova	2–1	1–2
Langreo (Asturias)	3–5	(Galicia (Spain)) Racing Ferrol	2–2	1–3
Elgoibar (Basque Country (autonomous community))	2–8	(Cantabria) Racing Santander B	1–3	1–5
Terrassa (Catalonia)	1–1 (a)	(Aragon) Binéfar	1–1	0–0

=== Quarter-finals ===
Team 1	Agg.	Team 2	1st leg	2nd leg
Ceuta	2–1	(Extremadura) Cacereño	2–0	0–1
Alcalá (Community of Madrid)	3–1	(Canary Islands) Gáldar	2–0	1–1
Racing Ferrol (Galicia (Spain))	3–1	(Cantabria) Racing Santander B	1–0	2–1
Binéfar (Aragon)	5–1	(Region of Murcia) Cartagonova	4–0	1–1

=== Semifinals ===
Team 1	Agg.	Team 2	1st leg	2nd leg
Ceuta	1–2	(Community of Madrid) Alcalá	1–0	0–2
Binéfar (Aragon)	3–2	(Galicia (Spain)) Racing Ferrol	2–1	1–1

=== Final ===
Team 1	Agg.	Team 2	1st leg	2nd leg
Binéfar (Aragon)	3–2	(Community of Madrid) Alcalá	1–2	2–0
