= 2000–01 Copa Federación de España =

Tournament details
- Country: Spain
- Teams: 30

Final positions
- Champions: Marino Luanco
- Runners-up: Tropezón

The 2000–01 Copa Federación de España was the eighth staging of the Copa Federación de España, a knockout competition for Spanish football clubs in Segunda División B and Tercera División.

The Regional stages began in 2000, while the national tournament took place from November 2000 to April 2001.

== Regional tournaments ==
=== Asturias tournament ===
First round
Marino Luanco	1	1	2
Avilés	0	1	1
San Martín	0	0	0
Sporting Gijón B	3	2	5
Navia	1	3	4
Universidad Oviedo	4	2	6
Caudal	1	1	2
Langreo	0	1	1

Quarter-finals
Siero	1	1	2
Marino Luanco	5	1	6
Sporting Gijón B	5	0	5
Oviedo B	0	2	2
Astur	1	1	2
Universidad Oviedo (a)	2	0	2
Llanes (Note: Match awarded to Llanes due to illegal alignment of Caudal in the second leg. The match originally ended 2–3 after an overtime.)	1	3	4
Caudal	2	0	2

Semi-finals
Sporting Gijón B	0	1	1
Marino Luanco	1	2	3
Universidad Oviedo	2	2	4
Llanes (a)	1	3	4

Final
Marino Luanco	5
Llanes	0

== National tournament ==
=== Preliminary round ===
Team 1	Agg.	Team 2	1st leg	2nd leg
Pontevedra (Galicia (Spain))	3–4	(Asturias) Lealtad	0–2	3–2
Marino Luanco (Asturias)	6–0	(Galicia (Spain)) Xove Lago	4–0	2–0
Lemona (Basque Country (autonomous community))	0–1	(Cantabria) Tropezón	0–1	0–0
Amurrio (Basque Country (autonomous community))	1–2	(Cantabria) Noja	1–1	0–1
Peña Sport (Navarre)	1–2	(La Rioja) Calahorra	0–0	1–2
Fraga (Aragon)	2–7	(Aragon) Zaragoza B	0–6	2–1
Sabadell (Catalonia)	4–0	(Catalonia) Balaguer	1–0	3–0
Atlético Baleares (Balearic Islands)	1–2	(Catalonia) Terrassa	1–1	0–1
San Isidro (Canary Islands)	2–4	(Castile and León) La Bañeza	2–1	0–3
Arandina (Castile and León)	0–11	(Castile and León) Coslada	0–3	0–8
Burjassot (Valencian Community)	3–4	(Region of Murcia) Cartagonova	2–2	1–2
San Fernando (Andalusia)	1–2	(Extremadura) Jerez	1–1	0–1
Tomelloso (Castilla–La Mancha)	0–1	(Extremadura) Don Benito	0–0	0–1
Olímpico Totana (Region of Murcia)	w.o.	(Valencian Community) Hércules		

- Castellón and Puertollano received a bye.

=== Round of 16 ===
Team 1	Agg.	Team 2	1st leg	2nd leg
Tropezón (Cantabria)	4–3	(Asturias) Lealtad	1–1	3–2
Noja (Cantabria)	1–3	(Asturias) Marino Luanco	0–1	1–2
Sabadell (Catalonia)	1–2	(Aragon) Zaragoza B	0–1	1–1
Terrassa (Catalonia)	3–3 (a)	(La Rioja) Calahorra	1–1	2–2
Olímpico Totana (Region of Murcia)	3–8	(Castilla–La Mancha) Puertollano	2–0	1–8
Cartagonova (Region of Murcia)	2–3	(Valencian Community) Castellón	1–2	1–1
Coslada (Community of Madrid)	0–1	(Extremadura) Don Benito	0–0	0–1
Jerez (Extremadura)	3–4	(Castile and León) La Bañeza	2–2	1–2

=== Quarter-finals ===
Team 1	Agg.	Team 2	1st leg	2nd leg
Marino Luanco (Asturias)	3–2	(Castile and León) La Bañeza	2–0	1–2
Tropezón (Cantabria)	2–1	(Aragon) Zaragoza B	2–0	0–1
Castellón (Valencian Community)	4–2	(Catalonia) Terrassa	2–0	2–2
Don Benito (Extremadura)	1–2	(Castilla–La Mancha) Puertollano	1–1	0–1

=== Semifinals ===
Team 1	Agg.	Team 2	1st leg	2nd leg
Marino Luanco (Asturias)	4–4 (a)	(Castilla–La Mancha) Puertollano	1–1	3–3
Castellón (Valencian Community)	0–2	(Cantabria) Tropezón	0–1	0–1

=== Final ===
Team 1	Agg.	Team 2	1st leg	2nd leg
Tropezón (Cantabria)	0–4	(Asturias) Marino Luanco	0–1	0–3
