= 1999–2000 Copa Federación de España =

Tournament details
- Country: Spain
- Teams: 31

Final positions
- Champions: Sabadell
- Runner-up: Elche

The 1999–2000 Copa Federación de España was the seventh staging of the Copa Federación de España, a knockout competition for Spanish football clubs in Segunda División B and Tercera División.

The Regional stages began in 1999, while the national tournament took place from November 1999 to April 2000.

== Regional tournaments ==
=== Asturias tournament ===
First round
Navarro	2	0	2
Caudal	2	4	6
Langreo	1	1	2
Avilés	3	8	11
Navia	1	1	2
Oviedo B	4	2	6
Siero	0	2	2
Universidad Oviedo	3	1	4
San Martín	1	0	1
Sporting Gijón B	0	3	3
Lealtad	0	0	0
Tuilla	3	0	3

Quarter-finals
Caudal	2	1	3
Avilés (p)	2	1	3
Oviedo B	0	1	1
Marino Luanco	0	0	0
Universidad Oviedo	0	1	1
Sporting Gijón B	1	2	3
Tuilla	3	3	6
Titánico	3	0	3

Semi-finals
Avilés	1	1	2
Oviedo B	0	0	0
Sporting Gijón B	1	1	2
Tuilla	1	3	4

Final
Avilés	4
Tuilla	1

== National tournament ==
=== Preliminary round ===
Team 1	Agg.	Team 2	1st leg	2nd leg
Las Rozas (Community of Madrid)	0–2	(Castile and León) Ávila	0–0	0–2
Cultural Leonesa (Castile and León)	1–5	(Galicia (Spain)) Racing Ferrol	0–2	1–3
Compostela B (Galicia (Spain))	0–6	(Asturias) Avilés	0–1	0–5
Noja (Cantabria)	2–2 (a)	(Basque Country (autonomous community)) Lemona	0–1	2–1
Racing Santander B (Cantabria)	2–1	(Navarre) Izarra	2–0	0–1
Sabadell (Catalonia)	2–2 (a)	(La Rioja) Logroñés B	0–1	2–1
Binéfar (Aragon)	3–3 (a)	(Aragon) Figueruelas	2–2	1–1
Arandina (Castile and León)	4–5	(Castile and León) Burgos	3–2	1–3
Onda (Valencian Community)	4–1	(Balearic Islands) Mallorca B	1–0	3–1
Murcia (Region of Murcia)	4–2	(Region of Murcia) Cartagonova	3–1	1–1
Elche (Valencian Community)	7–2	(Region of Murcia) Águilas	2–1	5–1
Jerez (Extremadura)	0–1	(Andalusia) Linense	0–0	0–1
Las Palmas B (Canary Islands)	1–4	(Canary Islands) Universidad de Las Palmas	0–1	1–3
Lanzarote (Canary Islands)	3–2	(Andalusia) Cádiz	1–1	2–1
Villarrobledo (Castilla–La Mancha)	w.o.	(Valencian Community) Levante		

- Lucentino received a bye.

=== Round of 16 ===
Team 1	Agg.	Team 2	1st leg	2nd leg
Noja (Cantabria)	3–2	(Asturias) Avilés	3–1	0–1
Racing Ferrol (Galicia (Spain))	1–2	(Cantabria) Racing Santander B	1–0	0–2
Villarrobledo (Castilla–La Mancha)	1–4	(Castile and León) Burgos	1–2	0–2
Ávila (Castile and León)	5–1	(Aragon) Figueruelas	2–1	3–0
Onda (Valencian Community)	3–4	(Valencian Community) Elche	1–1	2–3
Sabadell (Catalonia)	3–2	(Region of Murcia) Murcia	1–1	2–1
Lucentino (Andalusia)	3–3 (a)	(Andalusia) Linense	2–2	1–1
Lanzarote (Canary Islands)	3–0	(Canary Islands) Universidad de Las Palmas	0–0	3–0

=== Quarter-finals ===
Team 1	Agg.	Team 2	1st leg	2nd leg
Noja (Cantabria)	1–1 (a)	(Cantabria) Racing Santander B	1–1	0–0
Sabadell (Catalonia)	3–2	(Canary Islands) Lanzarote	2–1	1–1
Linense (Andalusia)	3–3 (p)	(Valencian Community) Elche	1–2	2–1
Burgos (Castile and León)	5–4	(Castile and León) Ávila	5–1	0–3

=== Semifinals ===
Team 1	Agg.	Team 2	1st leg	2nd leg
Burgos (Castile and León)	1–4	(Valencian Community) Elche	1–1	0–3
Racing Santander B (Cantabria)	1–4	(Catalonia) Sabadell	1–0	0–4

=== Final ===
Team 1	Agg.	Team 2	1st leg	2nd leg
Sabadell (Catalonia)	3–3 (a)	(Valencian Community) Elche	2–0	1–3 (a.e.t.)
