= 1995–96 Copa Federación de España =

Tournament details
- Country: Spain
- Teams: 18

Final positions
- Champions: Mallorca B
- Runners-up: Murcia

Tournament statistics
- Matches played: 34
- Goals scored: 99 (2.91 per match)

The 1995–96 Copa Federación de España was the third staging of the Copa Federación de España, a knockout competition for Spanish football clubs.

== Regional tournaments ==
=== Asturias tournament ===
Round of 16
6 and 20 September
Lealtad	1	1	2
Siero	3	2	5
7 and 21 September
Langreo	4	1	5
Oviedo B	1	1	2
6 and 21 September
Caudal	5	0	5
Titánico	0	1	1

Quarter-finals
27 September 4 October
Turón (a)	0	1	1
Siero	0	1	1
25 October and 8 November
Langreo	1	0	1
Caudal	1	2	3
25 October and 8 November
Rey Aurelio	1	0	1
Sporting Gijón B	1	4	5
25 October and 8 November
Hispano	1	0	1
Avilés	3	7	10

Semi-finals
29 November and 13 December
Turón	1	2	3
Caudal	0	5	5
22 November and 6 December
Sporting Gijón B	1	2	3
Avilés	1	0	1

Final
21 December and 3 January
Caudal	3	1	4
Sporting Gijón B	1	1	2

=== Castile and León tournament ===
Team 1	Agg.	Team 2	1st leg	2nd leg
Real Burgos	2–2 (a)	Zamora	2–2	0–0

== National competition ==
=== Preliminary round ===
Team 1	Agg.	Team 2	1st leg	2nd leg
Tomelloso	2–4	Aranjuez	0–3	2–1
Benidorm	0–3	Murcia	0–1	0–2

=== First round ===
Team 1	Agg.	Team 2	1st leg	2nd leg
Caudal	4–3	Deportivo B	1–0	3–3
Lemona	2–3	Racing B	1–2	1–1
Corralejo	4–3	Las Palmas B	1–0	3–3
Espanyol B	0–1	Mallorca B	0–0	0–1
Isla Cristina	4–3	Cacereño	2–1	2–2
Zamora	5–3	Aranjuez	1–1	4–2
Murcia	3–1	Polideportivo Almería	2–0	1–1
Teruel	2–0	Osasuna B	1–0	1–0

=== Second round ===
Team 1	Agg.	Team 2	1st leg	2nd leg
Caudal	3–1	Racing B	0–1	3–0
Corralejo	4–6	Mallorca B	2–1	2–5
Isla Cristina	3–0	Zamora	3–0	0–0
Murcia	8–2	Teruel	3–2	5–0

=== Semi-finals ===
Team 1	Agg.	Team 2	1st leg	2nd leg
Caudal	5–5(a)	Mallorca B	5–1	0–4
Isla Cristina	2–4	Murcia	1–2	1–2

=== Final ===
Team 1	Agg.	Team 2	1st leg	2nd leg
Murcia	2–3	Mallorca B	0–1	1–3 (a.e.t.)
