= 2002–03 Copa Federación de España =

Tournament details
- Country: Spain
- Teams: 33 (in the National stage)

Final positions
- Champions: Avilés
- Runners-up: Tomelloso

The 2002–03 Copa Federación de España was the tenth staging of the Copa Federación de España, a knockout competition for Spanish football clubs in Segunda División B and Tercera División.

The Regional stages began in 2002, while the national tournament took place from 14 November 2002 to 17 April 2003.

== Regional tournaments ==
=== Asturias tournament ===
==== Preliminary round ====
===== Group A =====
Pos	Team	Pld	W	D	L	GF	GA	GD	Pts	Qualification
1	Pumarín	4	3	1	0	6	1	+5	10	Qualification to semifinals
2	Caudal	4	2	1	1	4	2	+2	7	
3	Colloto	4	0	0	4	2	9	−7	0	

Source: Royal Asturias Football Federation
Rules for classification: 1) Points; 2) Head-to-head results; 3) Goal difference; 4) Number of goals scored

===== Group B =====
Pos	Team	Pld	W	D	L	GF	GA	GD	Pts	Qualification
1	Sporting Gijón B	4	3	0	1	7	4	+3	9	Qualification to semifinals
2	Llanes	4	2	0	2	8	8	0	6	
3	Universidad Oviedo	4	1	0	3	6	9	−3	3	

Source: Royal Asturias Football Federation
Rules for classification: 1) Points; 2) Head-to-head results; 3) Goal difference; 4) Number of goals scored

===== Group C =====
Pos	Team	Pld	W	D	L	GF	GA	GD	Pts	Qualification
1	Navarro	4	2	1	1	5	2	+3	7	Qualification to semifinals
2	Oviedo B (Note: Oviedo B was deducted three points due to not having registered players for the game of the round 1. This game was awarded to Navarro by 0–3.)	4	2	1	1	4	5	−1	4	
3	Ribadesella	4	1	0	3	2	4	−2	3	

Source: Royal Asturias Football Federation
Rules for classification: 1) Points; 2) Head-to-head results; 3) Goal difference; 4) Number of goals scored

===== Group D =====
Pos	Team	Pld	W	D	L	GF	GA	GD	Pts	Qualification
1	Avilés	4	2	1	1	7	3	+4	7	Qualification to semifinals
2	San Martín	4	2	1	1	3	4	−1	7	
3	Siero	4	0	2	2	2	5	−3	2	

Source: Royal Asturias Football Federation
Rules for classification: 1) Points; 2) Head-to-head results; 3) Goal difference; 4) Number of goals scored

==== Final bracket ====
Semi-finals
Pumarín	0	1	1
Sporting Gijón B	1	5	6
Navarro	3	1	4
Avilés (a)	2	2	4

Final
Avilés
Sporting Gijón B	0
Avilés	2

=== Castile and León tournament ===
Semi-finals
Palencia	1	1	2
Atlético Tordesillas	1	0	1
Guijuelo	1	3	4
La Bañeza	2	3	5

Final
Palencia	1	1	2
La Bañeza	2	3	5

== National tournament ==
=== Preliminary round ===
Team 1	Agg.	Team 2	1st leg	2nd leg
Ávila (Castile and León)	5–2	(Community of Madrid) Real Madrid C	2–0	3–2

=== Round of 32 ===
Team 1	Agg.	Team 2	1st leg	2nd leg
Celta B (Galicia (Spain))	5–3	(Galicia (Spain)) Alondras	2–3	3–0
Langreo (Asturias)	1–2	(Asturias) Marino Luanco	0–0	1–2
Noja (Cantabria)	1–1 (p)	(Basque Country (autonomous community)) Aurrerá Vitoria	0–1	1–0
Atlético Baleares (Balearic Islands)	3–1	(Valencian Community) Burriana	1–0	2–1
Ferriolense (Balearic Islands)	2–3	(Valencian Community) Levante B	1–1	1–2
Rápido Bouzas (Galicia (Spain))	4–4 (a)	(Galicia (Spain)) Pontevedra	4–1	0–3
Tomelloso (Castilla–La Mancha)	3–2	(Castile and León) Ávila	2–1	1–1
Socuéllamos (Castilla–La Mancha)	2–6	(Region of Murcia) Ciudad de Murcia	2–2	0–4
Orihuela (Valencian Community)	2–4	(Region of Murcia) Lorca	2–2	0–2
Ceuta	2–3	(Andalusia) Algeciras	2–1	0–2
San Isidro (Canary Islands)	2–4	(Andalusia) Marbella	1–0	1–4
Peralta (Navarre)	5–1	(Catalonia) Reus Deportiu	2–0	3–1
Fraga (Aragon)	1–3	(Aragon) Binéfar	0–3	1–0
Mérida (Extremadura)	6–1	(Extremadura) Don Benito	2–0	4–1
La Bañeza (Castile and León)	1–6	(Asturias) Avilés	0–3	1–3
Gimnástica Torrelavega (Cantabria)	0–2	(La Rioja) Recreación	0–0	0–2

=== Round of 16 ===
Team 1	Agg.	Team 2	1st leg	2nd leg
Aurrerá Vitoria (Basque Country (autonomous community))	3–4	(Aragon) Binéfar	2–2	1–2
Marino Luanco (Asturias)	1–2	(Galicia (Spain)) Celta Vigo B	0–1	1–1
Levante B (Valencian Community)	2–2 (p)	(Region of Murcia) Lorca	2–0	2–0
Recreación (La Rioja)	2–4	(Navarre) Peralta	1–2	1–2
Mérida (Extremadura)	2–2 (a)	(Castilla–La Mancha) Tomelloso	2–1	1–0
Algeciras (Andalusia)	5–4	(Andalusia) Marbella	2–2	3–2
Avilés (Asturias)	5–1	(Galicia (Spain)) Pontevedra	4–1	1–0
Ciudad de Murcia (Region of Murcia)	1–2	(Balearic Islands) Atlético Baleares	1–0	0–2

=== Quarter-finals ===
Team 1	Agg.	Team 2	1st leg	2nd leg
Levante B (Valencian Community)	3–2	(Balearic Islands) Atlético Baleares	3–0	0–2
Celta Vigo B (Galicia (Spain))	0–5	(Asturias) Avilés	0–3	0–2
Algeciras (Andalusia)	1–2	(Castilla–La Mancha) Tomelloso	0–0	1–2
Binéfar (Aragon)	1–3	(Navarre) Peralta	0–3	1–0

=== Semifinals ===
Team 1	Agg.	Team 2	1st leg	2nd leg
Avilés (Asturias)	2–1	(Valencian Community) Levante B	0–1	2–0
Peralta (Navarre)	0–1	(Castilla–La Mancha) Tomelloso	0–1	0–0

=== Final ===
Team 1	Agg.	Team 2	1st leg	2nd leg
Avilés (Asturias)	3–1	(Castilla–La Mancha) Tomelloso	3–0	0–1
