= 1994–95 Copa Federación de España =

Tournament details
- Country: Spain
- Teams: 16

Final positions
- Champions: Las Palmas B
- Runners-up: Balaguer

Tournament statistics
- Matches played: 30
- Goals scored: 88 (2.93 per match)

The 1994–95 Copa Federación de España was the second edition of the Copa Federación de España, a knockout competition for Spanish football clubs, since its reinstatement.

== Regional tournaments ==
=== Asturias tournament ===
Quarter-finals
26 December and 2 January
Siero	3	1	4
Rey Aurelio	1	0	1
26 December and 2 January
Lealtad	2	1	3
Gijón Industrial	1	1	2
26 December and 2 January
Marino Luanco	2	1	3
Sporting Gijón B	1	6	7
26 December and 2 January
Oviedo B	0	3	3
Piloñesa	2	0	2

Semi-finals
15 and 22 March
Lealtad	2	0	2
Siero	2	2	4
9 and 22 March
Oviedo B	0	1	1
Sporting Gijón B	1	3	4

Final
29 March and 5 April
Siero	2	1	3
Sporting Gijón B	1	1	2

=== Castile and León tournament ===
Team 1	Agg.	Team 2	1st leg	2nd leg
Zamora	4–2	Salamanca B	1–1	3–1

== Competition ==
=== Round of 16 ===
Team 1	Agg.	Team 2	1st leg	2nd leg
Zamora (Castile and León)	1–2	(Community of Madrid) Parla	0–0	1–2
Calahorra (La Rioja)	1–3	(Basque Country (autonomous community)) Aurrerá	0–1	1–2
Siero (Asturias)	3–5	(Cantabria) Racing B	2–1	1–4
Huesca (Aragon)	2–3	(Catalonia) Balaguer	1–1	1–2
Puertollano (Castilla–La Mancha)	5–4	(Andalusia) Maracena	3–1	2–3
Las Palmas B (Canary Islands)	9–0	(Galicia (Spain)) Betanzos	5–0	4–0
Jerez (Extremadura)	3–4	(Andalusia) Los Palacios	3–1	0–3
Mallorca B (Balearic Islands)	1–3	(Valencian Community) Onda	0–2	1–1

=== Quarterfinals ===
Team 1	Agg.	Team 2	1st leg	2nd leg
Parla (Community of Madrid)	3–5	(Castilla–La Mancha) Puertollano	1–1	2–4
Las Palmas B (Canary Islands)	4–1	(Andalusia) Los Palacios	3–1	1–0
Aurrerá (Basque Country (autonomous community))	0–6	(Cantabria) Racing B	0–2	0–4
Onda (Valencian Community)	1–6	(Catalonia) Balaguer	1–4	0–2

=== Semi-finals ===
Team 1	Agg.	Team 2	1st leg	2nd leg
Puertollano (Castilla–La Mancha)	1–3	(Canary Islands) Las Palmas B	1–0	0–3
Racing B (Cantabria)	1–3	(Catalonia) Balaguer	1–1	0–2

=== Final ===
Team 1	Agg.	Team 2	1st leg	2nd leg
Las Palmas B (Canary Islands)	4–1	(Catalonia) Balaguer	1–0	3–1
