= UD Gáldar =

Spanish football club

Gáldar
- Full name: Unión Deportiva Gáldar
- Founded: 1988
- Dissolved: 2012
- Ground: Barrial, Gáldar, Canary Islands, Spain
- Capacity: 5,000
- 2011–12: Interinsular Preferente, 10th of 18
Home colours	Away colours

Unión Deportiva Gáldar was a Spanish football team based in Gáldar, Las Palmas, in the autonomous community of Canary Islands. Founded in 1988 and dissolved in 2012, it last played in Interinsular Preferente, holding home matches at Estadio Barrial, with a capacity of 5,000 seats.

== Season to season ==
Season	Tier	Division	Place	Copa del Rey
1988–89	7	2ª Reg.	1st	
1989–90	6	1ª Reg.	1st	
1990–91	5	Int. Pref.	2nd	
1991–92	4	3ª	4th	
1992–93	4	3ª	15th	First round
1993–94	4	3ª	5th	
1994–95	4	3ª	4th	
1995–96	3	2ª B	15th	
1996–97	3	2ª B	10th	
1997–98	3	2ª B	17th	
1998–99	4	3ª	8th	
1999–2000	4	3ª	12th	

Season	Tier	Division	Place	Copa del Rey
2000–01	4	3ª	8th	
2001–02	4	3ª	9th	
2002–03	4	3ª	6th	
2003–04	4	3ª	5th	
2004–05	4	3ª	7th	
2005–06	4	3ª	8th	
2006–07	4	3ª	9th	
2007–08	4	3ª	3rd	
2008–09	4	3ª	7th	
2009–10	4	3ª	19th	
2010–11	5	Int. Pref.	5th	
2011–12	5	Int. Pref.	10th	

- 3 seasons in Segunda División B
- 16 seasons in Tercera División

== Famous players ==
- (Spain) Jon Bakero
- (Spain) Jordi Ocaña
- (Spain) Kiko Ratón
- (Uruguay) Federico Fuentes
- (Venezuela) Luis Reyes
- (Venezuela) Juan Carlos Socorro
