= CD Tuilla =

Association football club in Spain

Coordinates: 43.326395°N 5.643863°W

Tuilla
- Full name: Club Deportivo Tuilla
- Nickname: Dinamiteros (Dynamiters)
- Founded: 1952; 74 years ago
- Stadium: Estadio El Candín
- Capacity: 2,800
- President: Luis Alberto López Arbesú
- Head coach: Ricardo Bango
- League: Primera Asturfútbol
- 2025–26: Tercera Federación – Group 2, 17th of 18 (relegated)
Home colours	Away colours

Club Deportivo Tuilla is a Spanish football team based in Tuilla, a small village in the municipality of Langreo, in the autonomous community of Asturias. Founded in 1952, it plays in Primera Asturfútbol, holding home matches at Estadio El Candín, which has a capacity of 2,800 spectators.

== History ==
In 2007, Tuilla won the regional stage of the Copa Federación by the first time and reached the semi-finals in the 2007–08 National stage, after beating Laguna, Lemona and San Sebastián de los Reyes, before being eliminated by Ourense due to the away goals rule.

Tuilla repeated the Regional success in 2011 and 2012, but in both editions was eliminated in the Round of 32 of the National stage.

In the 2012–13 season, Tuilla finished as champion of the Asturian group of Tercera División, but failed in its third attempt of promoting to Segunda División B.

In 2013, Tuilla played for the first time in its history the Copa del Rey. In the first round, the team beat CD Tropezón by 0–1 in the overtime, in a game where Tuilla finished with nine players. Tuilla was eliminated in the second round by Burgos CF which won at El Candín by 0–3. In the 2017-18 season the club finished 7th in the Tercera División, Group 2.

In May 2019 Julio Llanos was appointed as head coach of the club.

== Season to season ==
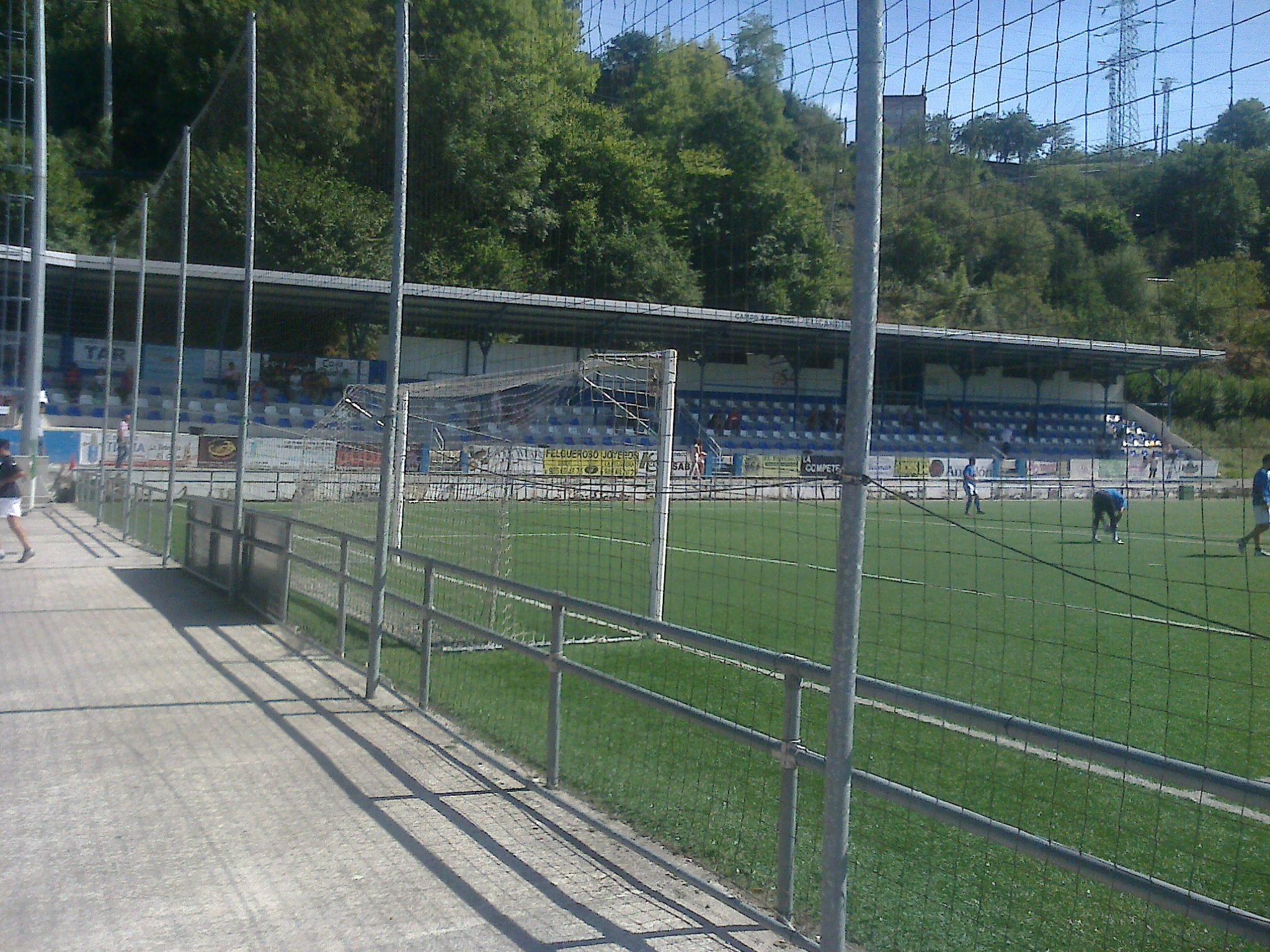
Main tribune of Estadio El Candín

Season	Tier	Division	Place	Copa del Rey
1952–53	5	2ª Reg.	9th	
1953–54	5	2ª Reg.	3rd	
1954–55	5	2ª Reg.		
1955–56	4	1ª Reg.	4th	
1956–57	4	1ª Reg.	8th	
1957–58	4	1ª Reg.	7th	
1958–59	4	1ª Reg.	2nd	
1959–60	4	1ª Reg.	6th	
1960–61	4	1ª Reg.	11th	
1961–62	4	1ª Reg.	4th	
1962–63	4	1ª Reg.	13th	
1963–64	4	1ª Reg.	15th	
1964–65	5	2ª Reg.		
1965–66	5	2ª Reg.	8th	
1966–67	5	2ª Reg.	6th	
1967–68	5	2ª Reg.	2nd	
1968–69	5	2ª Reg.	1st	
1969–70	4	1ª Reg.	3rd	
1970–71	4	1ª Reg.	14th	
1971–72	4	1ª Reg.	20th	

Season	Tier	Division	Place	Copa del Rey
1972–73	5	2ª Reg.	6th	
1973–74	5	2ª Reg. P.	5th	
1974–75	5	2ª Reg. P.	5th	
1975–76	5	2ª Reg. P.	5th	
1976–77	5	2ª Reg. P.	9th	
1977–78	6	2ª Reg. P.	19th	
1978–79	7	2ª Reg.	3rd	
1979–80	6	1ª Reg.	5th	
1980–81	6	1ª Reg.	2nd	
1981–82	5	Reg. Pref.	9th	
1982–83	5	Reg. Pref.	7th	
1983–84	5	Reg. Pref.	12th	
1984–85	5	Reg. Pref.	15th	
1985–86	5	Reg. Pref.	14th	
1986–87	5	Reg. Pref.	2nd	
1987–88	4	3ª	18th	
1988–89	5	Reg. Pref.	8th	
1989–90	5	Reg. Pref.	7th	
1990–91	5	Reg. Pref.	1st	
1991–92	4	3ª	17th	

Season	Tier	Division	Place	Copa del Rey
1992–93	5	Reg. Pref.	8th	
1993–94	5	Reg. Pref.	3rd	
1994–95	4	3ª	17th	
1995–96	5	Reg. Pref.	2nd	
1996–97	4	3ª	14th	
1997–98	4	3ª	9th	
1998–99	4	3ª	6th	
1999–2000	4	3ª	13th	
2000–01	4	3ª	19th	
2001–02	5	Reg. Pref.	4th	
2002–03	5	Reg. Pref.	4th	
2003–04	5	Reg. Pref.	8th	
2004–05	5	Reg. Pref.	3rd	
2005–06	4	3ª	15th	
2006–07	4	3ª	5th	
2007–08	4	3ª	6th	
2008–09	4	3ª	6th	
2009–10	4	3ª	7th	
2010–11	4	3ª	4th	
2011–12	4	3ª	4th	

Season	Tier	Division	Place	Copa del Rey
2012–13	4	3ª	1st	
2013–14	4	3ª	6th	Second round
2014–15	4	3ª	4th	
2015–16	4	3ª	5th	
2016–17	4	3ª	4th	
2017–18	4	3ª	7th	
2018–19	4	3ª	7th	
2019–20	4	3ª	5th	
2020–21	4	3ª	4th / 1st	
2021–22	5	3ª RFEF	9th	
2022–23	5	3ª Fed.	11th	
2023–24	5	3ª Fed.	7th	
2024–25	5	3ª Fed.	10th	
2025–26	5	3ª Fed.		

- 24 seasons in Tercera División
- 5 seasons in Tercera Federación/Tercera División RFEF

== Honours ==
- Tercera División: 2012–13
- Copa RFEF (Asturias tournament): (3) 2007, 2011, 2012

== Famous coaches ==
- (Spain) Abelardo Fernández
- (Spain) Ricardo Bango
