= CD Laguna de Tenerife =

Spanish football team

Laguna
- Full name: Club Deportivo Laguna, S.A.D.
- Founded: 1984
- Ground: Francisco Peraza, San Cristóbal, Canary Islands, Spain
- Capacity: 8,000
- Chairman: (Spain) Pedro del Castillo
- Manager: (Spain) David Rodríguez
- League: Tercera Federación – Group 12
- 2025–26: Interinsular Preferente, 2nd of 20 (promoted via play-offs)
Home colours	Away colours

Club Deportivo Laguna, S.A.D. is a Spanish football team based in San Cristóbal de La Laguna, in the Canary Islands. Founded in 1984 it plays in Tercera Federación – Group 12, holding home games at Estadio Francisco Peraza, with a capacity of 8,000 seats.

== History ==
Club Deportivo Laguna was founded in 1984 as Asociación Deportiva Laguna, through a merger of various teams from the city, and took the place of CD Estrella in Tercera División.

=== Club background ===
- AD Laguna (1984–2007)
- CD Laguna, SAD (2007)

== Season to season ==
Season	Tier	Division	Place	Copa del Rey
1984–85	4	3ª	9th	
1985–86	4	3ª	15th	
1986–87	4	3ª	4th	
1987–88	4	3ª	9th	
1988–89	4	3ª	15th	
1989–90	4	3ª	11th	
1990–91	4	3ª	5th	
1991–92	4	3ª	16th	
1992–93	4	3ª	2nd	
1993–94	4	3ª	9th	
1994–95	4	3ª	18th	
1995–96	5	Int. Pref.	6th	
1996–97	5	Int. Pref.	5th	
1997–98	5	Int. Pref.	7th	
1998–99	5	Int. Pref.	11th	
1999–2000	5	Int. Pref.	1st	
2000–01	4	3ª	15th	
2001–02	4	3ª	11th	
2002–03	4	3ª	14th	
2003–04	4	3ª	3rd	

Season	Tier	Division	Place	Copa del Rey
2004–05	4	3ª	3rd	
2005–06	4	3ª	2nd	
2006–07	4	3ª	6th	
2007–08	4	3ª	10th	
2008–09	4	3ª	5th	
2009–10	4	3ª	15th	
2010–11	4	3ª	12th	
2011–12	4	3ª	18th	
2012–13	5	Int. Pref.	3rd	
2013–14	4	3ª	13th	
2014–15	4	3ª	19th	
2015–16	5	Int. Pref.	5th	
2016–17	5	Int. Pref.	16th	
2017–18	6	1ª Int.	5th	
2018–19	6	1ª Int.	4th	
2019–20	6	1ª Int.	2nd	
2020–21	5	Int. Pref.	1st	
2021–22	6	Int. Pref.	2nd	First round
2022–23	6	Int. Pref.	4th	
2023–24	6	Int. Pref.	4th	

Season	Tier	Division	Place	Copa del Rey
2024–25	6	Int. Pref.	8th	
2025–26	6	Int. Pref.	2nd	
2026–27	5	3ª Fed.		

- 25 seasons in Tercera División
- 1 season in Tercera Federación

== Famous players ==
- (Spain) Ignacio Conte
- (Russia) Milen Raykov
- (Spain) Pedri
