= 1998–99 Copa Federación de España =

Tournament details
- Country: Spain
- Teams: 18

Final positions
- Champions: Racing de Santander B
- Runner-up: Lugo

The 1998–99 Copa Federación de España was the sixth staging of the Copa Federación de España, a knockout competition for Spanish football clubs in Segunda División B and Tercera División.

The Regional stages began in 1998, while the national tournament took place from November 1998 to April 1999.

== Regional tournaments ==
=== Asturias tournament ===
First round
Navia	1	1	2
Andés	0	1	1
Tuilla	0	0	0
Siero	0	2	2
Pumarín	3	1	4
Universidad Oviedo	1	1	2
Marino Luanco	1	1	2
Narcea	0	0	0

Quarter-finals
Navia	0	0	0
Langreo	0	2	2
Siero	1	0	1
Sporting Gijón B	3	3	6
Caudal	0	2	2
Pumarín	0	1	1
Marino Luanco	2	0	2
Oviedo B (a)	2	0	2

Semi-finals
Langreo	0	2	2
Sporting Gijón B	2	3	5
Caudal	2	1	3
Oviedo B	1	0	1

Final
Caudal (a)	1	1	2
Sporting Gijón B	2	0	2

=== Castile and León tournament ===
Semi-finals
Zamora	1	1	2
Burgos	1	2	3
Cuéllar	1	3	4
Gimnástica Segoviana	3	3	6

Final
Burgos	3	0	3
Gimnástica Segoviana	0	1	1

== National tournament ==
=== Preliminary round ===
Team 1	Agg.	Team 2	1st leg	2nd leg
Tomelloso (Castilla–La Mancha)	1–2	(Community of Madrid) Amorós	0–0	1–2
Binéfar (Aragon)	4–2	(Aragon) Zaragoza B	2–1	2–1

=== Round of 16 ===
Team 1	Agg.	Team 2	1st leg	2nd leg
Burgos (Castile and León)	2–3	(Galicia (Spain)) Lugo	0–2	2–1
Caudal (Asturias)	3–3 (a)	(Cantabria) Racing Santander B	3–1	0–2
Real Unión (Basque Country (autonomous community))	2–4	(Navarre) Tudelano	1–1	1–3
Sabadell (Catalonia)	1–3	(Aragon) Binéfar	1–0	1–3
Amorós (Community of Madrid)	1–1 (a)	(Community of Madrid) Alcalá	0–0	1–1
Murcia (Region of Murcia)	1–3	(Canary Islands) Las Palmas B	1–1	0–2
Poblense (Balearic Islands)	3–7	(Valencian Community) Elche B	2–0	1–7
Isla Cristina (Andalusia)	2–2 (a)	(Extremadura) Sport Villanueva	2–2	0–0

=== Quarter-finals ===
Team 1	Agg.	Team 2	1st leg	2nd leg
Tudelano (Navarre)	3–3 (a)	(Galicia (Spain)) Lugo	2–2	1–1
Racing Santander B (Cantabria)	3–3 (a)	(Aragon) Binéfar	2–0	1–3
Sport Villanueva (Extremadura)	2–4	(Valencian Community) Elche B	2–2	0–2
Las Palmas B (Canary Islands)	3–2	(Community of Madrid) Amorós	2–1	1–1

=== Semifinals ===
Team 1	Agg.	Team 2	1st leg	2nd leg
Las Palmas B (Canary Islands)	4–6	(Cantabria) Racing Santander B	2–2	2–4
Lugo (Galicia (Spain))	5–4	(Valencian Community) Elche B	4–3	1–1

=== Final ===
Team 1	Agg.	Team 2	1st leg	2nd leg
Lugo (Galicia (Spain))	0–3	(Cantabria) Racing Santander B	0–3	0–0
