= 1996–97 Copa Federación de España =

Tournament details
- Country: Spain
- Teams: 18 (in its national stage)

Final positions
- Champions: Burgos
- Runner-up: Gáldar

The 1996–97 Copa Federación de España was the fourth edition of the Copa Federación de España in its modern format, a knockout competition for Spanish football clubs.

== Regional tournaments ==
=== Asturias tournament ===
First round
Navia	1	4	5
Universidad Oviedo	0	2	2
Gijón Industrial	0	1	1
Lealtad	2	5	7

Quarter-finals
Navia	1	2	3
Lealtad	0	0	0
Caudal	2	1	3
Langreo	0	2	2
Titánico	1	0	1
Oviedo B	2	2	4
Mosconia	1	0	1
Sporting Gijón B	1	3	4

Semi-finals
Navia	2	1	3
Caudal	0	1	1
Oviedo B	1	0	1
Sporting Gijón B	3	3	6

Final
Navia	1	2	3
Sporting Gijón B	4	2	6

=== Castile and León tournament ===
Team 1	Agg.	Team 2	1st leg	2nd leg
Burgos	7–0	Zamora	2–0	5–0

== National stage ==
=== Preliminary round ===
Team 1	Agg.	Team 2	1st leg	2nd leg
San Fernando (Andalusia)	4–4 (a)	(Andalusia) Maracena	3–0	1–4
Mallorca B (Balearic Islands)	3–2	(Balearic Islands) Sóller	3–0	0–2

== Last 16 ==
Team 1	Agg.	Team 2	1st leg	2nd leg
Valencia B (Valencian Community)	4–2	(Aragon) Endesa Andorra	3–1	1–2
San Fernando (Andalusia)	1–7	(Canary Islands) Gáldar	1–4	0–3
Valdepeñas (Castilla–La Mancha)	1–9	(Region of Murcia) Cartagonova	1–3	0–6
Gavà (Catalonia)	0–4	(Balearic Islands) Mallorca B	0–3	0–1
Sporting Gijón B (Asturias)	2–0	(Galicia (Spain)) Cerceda	0–0	2–0
Don Benito (Extremadura)	1–2	(Community of Madrid) Santa Ana	1–0	0–2
Izarra (Navarre)	4–3	(Basque Country (autonomous community)) Lemona	1–2	3–1
Tropezón (Cantabria)	2–6	(Castile and León) Burgos	0–2	2–4

== Quarter-Finals ==
Team 1	Agg.	Team 2	1st leg	2nd leg
Gáldar (Canary Islands)	2–1	(Valencian Community) Valencia B	1–1	1–0
Cartagonova (Region of Murcia)	3–3 (a)	(Balearic Islands) Mallorca B	1–1	2–2
Sporting Gijón B (Asturias)	3–0	(Community of Madrid) Santa Ana	2–0	1–0
Izarra (Navarre)	3–4	(Castile and León) Burgos	1–1	2–3

== Semi-finals ==
Team 1	Agg.	Team 2	1st leg	2nd leg
Gáldar (Canary Islands)	6–4	(Region of Murcia) Cartagonova	5–0	1–4
Sporting Gijón B (Asturias)	2–3	(Castile and León) Burgos	0–0	2–3

== Final ==
Team 1	Agg.	Team 2	1st leg	2nd leg
Gáldar (Canary Islands)	2–5	(Castile and León) Burgos	1–1	1–4
