= CD Villanueva =

Spanish football club

Villanueva
- Full name: Club Deportivo Villanueva
- Founded: 1951
- Dissolved: 2009
- Ground: San Miguel, Villanueva, Andalusia, Spain
- Capacity: 4,500
- 2008–09: 3ª - Group 10, (R)
| Home colours | Away colours |

Club Deportivo Villanueva was a Spanish football team based in Villanueva de Córdoba, in the autonomous community of Andalusia. It was founded in 1951 and dissolved in June 2009, it held home matches at Estadio San Miguel, with a capacity of 4,500 seats.

== History ==
Villanueva first reached the fourth division in 1999, after nearly 50 years in the regional leagues. At the end of the 2004–05 season, after two unsuccessful playoff visits, the club reached the third level for the first time ever.

Villanueva returned to division four after two seasons, finishing 18th in 2006–07. At the end of the 2008–09 campaign, the team did not present itself for two matches, losing its berth in the competition.

Subsequently, Villanueva was automatically inscribed in Primera Andaluza, dropping another level if it decided not to enroll. Finally, in July 2009, the club was dissolved due to asphyxiant debts, leaving Atlético Villanueva as the most representative team in the city.

== Season to season ==
| Season | Tier | Division | Place | Copa del Rey |
|---|---|---|---|---|
| 1951–1960 | — | Regional | — | |
| 1960–61 | 4 | 1ª Reg. | 3rd | |
| 1961–1970 | — | Regional | — | |
| 1970–71 | 5 | 2ª Reg. | 8th | |
| 1971–72 | 5 | 2ª Reg. | 1st | |
| 1972–73 | 5 | 2ª Reg. | 2nd | |
| 1973–74 | 5 | 2ª Reg. | 5th | |
| 1974–75 | 5 | 2ª Reg. | 5th | |
| 1975–76 | 6 | 2ª Reg. | 19th | |
| 1976–77 | 6 | 2ª Reg. | 9th | |
| 1977–78 | 7 | 2ª Reg. | 3rd | |
| 1978–79 | 7 | 2ª Reg. | 9th | |
| 1979–80 | 7 | 2ª Reg. | 9th | |
| 1980–81 | 6 | 1ª Reg. | 6th | |
| 1981–82 | 6 | 1ª Reg. | 11th | |
| 1982–83 | 6 | 1ª Reg. | 13th | |
| 1983–84 | 6 | 1ª Reg. | 5th | |
| 1984–85 | 6 | 1ª Reg. | 10th | |
| 1985–86 | 6 | 1ª Reg. | 1st | |
| 1986–87 | 5 | Reg. Pref. | 13th | |

| Season | Tier | Division | Place | Copa del Rey |
|---|---|---|---|---|
| 1987–88 | 5 | Reg. Pref. | 10th | |
| 1988–89 | 5 | Reg. Pref. | 15th | |
| 1989–90 | 5 | Reg. Pref. | 6th | |
| 1990–91 | 5 | Reg. Pref. | 11th | |
| 1991–92 | 5 | Reg. Pref. | 5th | |
| 1992–93 | 5 | Reg. Pref. | 6th | |
| 1993–94 | 5 | Reg. Pref. | 1st | |
| 1994–95 | 5 | Reg. Pref. | 1st | |
| 1995–96 | 5 | Reg. Pref. | 2nd | |
| 1996–97 | 5 | Reg. Pref. | 3rd | |
| 1997–98 | 5 | Reg. Pref. | 2nd | |
| 1998–99 | 5 | Reg. Pref. | 1st | |
| 1999–2000 | 4 | 3ª | 11th | |
| 2000–01 | 4 | 3ª | 13th | |
| 2001–02 | 4 | 3ª | 1st | |
| 2002–03 | 4 | 3ª | 1st | Preliminary |
| 2003–04 | 4 | 3ª | 5th | Preliminary |
| 2004–05 | 4 | 3ª | 1st | |
| 2005–06 | 3 | 2ªB | 15th | Preliminary |
| 2006–07 | 3 | 2ªB | 18th | |

| Season | Tier | Division | Place | Copa del Rey |
|---|---|---|---|---|
| 2007–08 | 4 | 3ª | 4th | |
| 2008–09 | 4 | 3ª | (R) | |

- 2 seasons in Segunda División B
- 7 seasons in Tercera División

== Famous players ==
- (Spain) Javi Lara
