= Real Titánico =

- Full name: Real Titánico de Laviana
- Nickname: Titanic
- Founded: 1912; 1964 (refounded)
- Stadium: Estadio Les Tolves
- Capacity: 2,000
- President: Francisco Javier Suárez
- Head coach: Alfonso Corte
- League: Primera Asturfútbol
- 2025–26: Tercera Federación – Group 2, 18th of 18 (relegated)
Home colours	Away colours

Real Titánico de Laviana is a Spanish football team based in Laviana, in the autonomous community of Asturias. Founded in 1912 and refounded in 1964, the team plays in Primera Asturfútbol. The club played their home games at Estadio Les Tolves, which has a capacity of 2,000 spectators.

== History ==
The club was created in 1912 as Titanic de Laviana. King Alfonso XIII accepted the Royal patronage of the club for the Spanish crown in 1922, introducing the term "Real" (Spanish for "Royal") to its name, becoming Real Titanic de Laviana.

After the Spanish Civil War, and due to a temporary law forbidding the use of foreign words in football club names, the team's official denomination changed to Real Titánico. The club was dissolved in 1960 but it was refounded in 1964 with the name of Laviana CF. In the 70's the team recovered the name of Real Titánico.

The best seasons of Titánico happened during the 1990s and the start of the 2000s, when the club played four times the promotion play-offs to Segunda División B and won one time the Asturian group of Tercera División. In 2006 the club started its decline with two consecutive relegations.

On 31 April 2017, after ten seasons in Primera Regional, sixth tier, Titánico came back to Regional Preferente. Three years later, Titánico promoted to Tercera División. This promotion was achieved as the club was leader of the Regional Preferente, with an advantage of 16 points over the second qualified team with ten rounds to be played, before the suspension of the league due to the COVID-19 pandemic.

== Season to season ==
Season	Tier	Division	Place	Copa del Rey
1950–51	5	2ª Reg.	4th	
1951–52	5	2ª Reg.	2nd	
1952–53	4	1ª Reg.	2nd	
1953–54	4	1ª Reg.	1st	
1954–55	3	3ª	6th	
1955–56	3	3ª	7th	
1956–57	3	3ª	3rd	
1957–58	3	3ª	9th	
1958–59	3	3ª	10th	
1959–60	3	3ª	12th	
1960–61	3	3ª	14th	
1961–62	3	3ª	16th	
1962–63	DNP			
1963–64	DNP			
1964–65	5	2ª Reg.	4th	
1965–66	4	1ª Reg.	2nd	
1966–67	3	3ª	10th	
1967–68	3	3ª	13th	
1968–69	4	1ª Reg.	4th	
1969–70	4	1ª Reg.	9th	

Season	Tier	Division	Place	Copa del Rey
1970–71	4	1ª Reg.	5th	
1971–72	4	1ª Reg.	12th	
1972–73	4	1ª Reg.	15th	
1973–74	4	Reg. Pref.	17th	
1974–75	4	Reg. Pref.	19th	
1975–76	5	2ª Reg. P.	1st	
1976–77	4	Reg. Pref.	12th	
1977–78	5	Reg. Pref.	2nd	
1978–79	5	Reg. Pref.	5th	
1979–80	5	Reg. Pref.	1st	
1980–81	4	3ª	14th	
1981–82	4	3ª	6th	
1982–83	4	3ª	16th	First round
1983–84	4	3ª	10th	
1984–85	4	3ª	17th	
1985–86	5	Reg. Pref.	11th	
1986–87	5	Reg. Pref.	8th	
1987–88	5	Reg. Pref.	2nd	
1988–89	4	3ª	7th	
1989–90	4	3ª	14th	

Season	Tier	Division	Place	Copa del Rey
1990–91	4	3ª	9th	
1991–92	4	3ª	6th	
1992–93	4	3ª	11th	First round
1993–94	4	3ª	10th	
1994–95	4	3ª	4th	
1995–96	4	3ª	1st	
1996–97	4	3ª	10th	
1997–98	4	3ª	15th	
1998–99	4	3ª	4th	
1999–2000	4	3ª	11th	
2000–01	4	3ª	8th	
2001–02	4	3ª	10th	
2002–03	4	3ª	2nd	
2003–04	4	3ª	8th	
2004–05	4	3ª	13th	
2005–06	4	3ª	20th	
2006–07	5	Reg. Pref.	17th	
2007–08	6	1ª Reg.	4th	
2008–09	6	1ª Reg.	9th	
2009–10	6	1ª Reg.	13th	

Season	Tier	Division	Place	Copa del Rey
2010–11	6	1ª Reg.	13th	
2011–12	6	1ª Reg.	4th	
2012–13	6	1ª Reg.	11th	
2013–14	6	1ª Reg.	3rd	
2014–15	6	1ª Reg.	10th	
2015–16	6	1ª Reg.	5th	
2016–17	6	1ª Reg.	1st	
2017–18	5	Reg. Pref.	10th	
2018–19	5	Reg. Pref.	6th	
2019–20	5	Reg. Pref.	1st	
2020–21	4	3ª	5th / 6th	Preliminary
2021–22	5	3ª RFEF	12th	
2022–23	5	3ª Fed.	9th	
2023–24	5	3ª Fed.	13th	
2024–25	5	3ª Fed.	13th	
2025–26	5	3ª Fed.	18th	
2026–27	6	1ª Astur.		

- 34 seasons in Tercera División
- 5 seasons in Tercera Federación/Tercera División RFEF

== Notable managers ==
- (Spain) Josu Uribe
