= Navia CF =

Navia
- Full name: Navia Club de Fútbol
- Founded: 1914 (re-founded in 1960)
- Ground: El Pardo, Navia, Asturias, Spain
- Capacity: 500
- Chairman: (Spain) Gabriel García Fernández
- Manager: (Spain) Pedro Luis González
- League: Segunda Asturfútbol – Group 1
- 2024–25: Segunda Asturfútbol – Group 2, 7th of 18
Home colours	Away colours

Navia Club de Fútbol is a Spanish football team based in Navia, in the autonomous community of Asturias. Founded in 1960, it plays in Segunda Asturfútbol – Group 1, holding home games at Estadio El Pardo, which has a capacity of 500 spectators.

== Season to season ==
Season	Level	Division	Place	Copa del Rey
1940–1951	—	Regional	—	
1951–52	5	2ª Reg.		
1952–53	4	1ª Reg.	7th	
1953–54	4	1ª Reg.	12th	
1954–1960	DNP			
1960–61	5	2ª Reg.	6th	
1961–62	5	2ª Reg.	1st	
1962–63	5	2ª Reg.	1st	
1963–64	5	2ª Reg.	1st	
1964–65	5	2ª Reg.	1st	
1965–66	5	2ª Reg.	2nd	
1966–67	4	1ª Reg.	13th	
1967–68	4	1ª Reg.	15th	
1968–69	5	2ª Reg.	4th	
1969–70	5	2ª Reg.	1st	
1970–71	5	2ª Reg.	3rd	
1971–72	5	2ª Reg.		
1972–73	5	2ª Reg.		
1973–74	5	2ª Reg. P.	8th	
1974–75	5	2ª Reg. P.	5th	

Season	Level	Division	Place	Copa del Rey
1975–76	5	2ª Reg. P.	12th	
1976–77	5	2ª Reg. P.	6th	
1977–78	6	2ª Reg. P.	2nd	
1978–79	5	Reg. Pref.	11th	
1979–80	5	Reg. Pref.	12th	
1980–81	5	Reg. Pref.	3rd	
1981–82	5	Reg. Pref.	6th	
1982–83	5	Reg. Pref.	2nd	
1983–84	5	Reg. Pref.	11th	
1984–85	5	Reg. Pref.	11th	
1985–86	5	Reg. Pref.	9th	
1986–87	5	Reg. Pref.	5th	
1987–88	5	Reg. Pref.	4th	
1988–89	5	Reg. Pref.	1st	
1989–90	4	3ª	17th	
1990–91	4	3ª	11th	
1991–92	4	3ª	7th	
1992–93	4	3ª	12th	
1993–94	4	3ª	17th	
1994–95	4	3ª	11th	

Season	Level	Division	Place	Copa del Rey
1995–96	4	3ª	9th	
1996–97	4	3ª	2nd	
1997–98	4	3ª	3rd	
1998–99	4	3ª	3rd	
1999–2000	4	3ª	7th	
2000–01	4	3ª	6th	
2001–02	4	3ª	14th	
2002–03	4	3ª	13th	
2003–04	4	3ª	19th	
2004–05	5	Reg. Pref.	5th	
2005–06	5	Reg. Pref.	7th	
2006–07	5	Reg. Pref.	19th	
2007–08	6	1ª Reg.	1st	
2008–09	5	Reg. Pref.	2nd	
2009–10	5	Reg. Pref.	1st	
2010–11	4	3ª	7th	
2011–12	4	3ª	12th	
2012–13	4	3ª	19th	
2013–14	5	Reg. Pref.	20th	
2014–15	6	1ª Reg.	18th	

Season	Level	Division	Place	Copa del Rey
2015–16	7	2ª Reg.	8th	
2016–17	7	2ª Reg.	5th	
2017–18	7	2ª Reg.	5th	
2018–19	7	2ª Reg.	9th	
2019–20	7	2ª Reg.	2nd	
2020–21	6	1ª Reg.	3rd	
2021–22	7	1ª Reg.	10th	
2022–23	8	3ª RFFPA	1st	
2023–24	7	2ª Astur.	5th	
2024–25	7	2ª Astur.	7th	
2025–26	7	2ª Astur.		

- 17 seasons in Tercera División

== Women's team ==
Navia created a women's football team in 2017. It started competing in the Regional league.

=== Season by season ===
Season	Division	Place	Copa de la Reina
2017/18	Regional	14th	
2018/19	Regional	18th	
2019/20	Regional	5th	
