= CD San Martín =

Spanish football club

Coordinates: 43.275407°N 5.595104°W

San Martín
- Full name: Club Deportivo San Martín
- Founded: 1950
- Dissolved: 2012
- Ground: Estadio El Florán, Sotrondio, Asturias, Spain
- Capacity: 2,000
- 2011–12: Regional Preferente, withdrew
| Home colours | Away colours |

Club Deportivo San Martín was Spanish football club based in Sotrondio, San Martín del Rey Aurelio in the autonomous community of Asturias. Founded in 1950 and dissolved in 2012, San Martín played its home games at Estadio El Florán.

== History ==
After a long time spent in Tercera División, also qualifying several times for the promotion playoffs and the Copa del Rey, the club started its decline in the 2000s. On 13 March 2012, San Martín was excluded from the fifth division after two consecutive forfeits and the club was dissolved.

=== Club naming ===
- Sociedad Deportiva Rey Aurelio 1992–1996
- Club Deportivo San Martín 1996–2012

== Season to season ==
| Season | Tier | Division | Place | Copa del Rey |
|---|---|---|---|---|
| 1950–51 | 5 | 2ª Reg. | 2nd | |
| 1951–52 | 5 | 2ª Reg. | 1st | |
| 1952–53 | 4 | 1ª Reg. | 1st | |
| 1953–54 | 3 | 3ª | 9th | |
| 1954–55 | 3 | 3ª | 5th | |
| 1955–56 | 4 | 1ª Reg. | 6th | |
| 1956–57 | 4 | 1ª Reg. | 4th | |
| 1957–58 | 3 | 3ª | 1st | |
| 1958–59 | 3 | 3ª | 11th | |
| 1959–60 | 3 | 3ª | 6th | |
| 1960–61 | 3 | 3ª | 12th | |
| 1961–62 | 3 | 3ª | 13th | |
| 1962–63 | 3 | 3ª | 11th | |
| 1963–64 | 3 | 3ª | 7th | |
| 1964–65 | 3 | 3ª | 5th | |
| 1965–66 | 3 | 3ª | 8th | |
| 1966–67 | 3 | 3ª | 8th | |
| 1967–68 | 3 | 3ª | 10th | |
| 1968–69 | 3 | 3ª | 7th | |
| 1969–70 | 3 | 3ª | 5th | First round |

| Season | Tier | Division | Place | Copa del Rey |
|---|---|---|---|---|
| 1970–71 | 3 | 3ª | 14th | |
| 1971–72 | 4 | 1ª Reg. | 9th | |
| 1972–73 | 4 | 1ª Reg. | 3rd | |
| 1973–74 | 4 | Reg. Pref. | 18th | |
| 1974–75 | 4 | Reg. Pref. | 4th | |
| 1975–76 | 4 | Reg. Pref. | 4th | |
| 1976–77 | 4 | Reg. Pref. | 11th | |
| 1977–78 | 5 | Reg. Pref. | 16th | |
| 1978–79 | 5 | Reg. Pref. | 2nd | |
| 1979–80 | 4 | 3ª | 20th | First round |
| 1980–81 | 4 | 3ª | 13th | |
| 1981–82 | 4 | 3ª | 15th | |
| 1982–83 | 4 | 3ª | 12th | |
| 1983–84 | 4 | 3ª | 7th | |
| 1984–85 | 4 | 3ª | 2nd | |
| 1985–86 | 4 | 3ª | 13th | First round |
| 1986–87 | 4 | 3ª | 18th | |
| 1987–88 | 4 | 3ª | 15th | |
| 1988–89 | 4 | 3ª | 18th | |
| 1989–90 | 5 | Reg. Pref. | 6th | |

| Season | Tier | Division | Place | Copa del Rey |
|---|---|---|---|---|
| 1990–91 | 5 | Reg. Pref. | 3rd | |
| 1991–92 | 4 | 3ª | 20th | |
| 1992–93 | 5 | Reg. Pref. | 2nd | |
| 1993–94 | 4 | 3ª | 14th | |
| 1994–95 | 4 | 3ª | 6th | |
| 1995–96 | 4 | 3ª | 11th | |
| 1996–97 | 4 | 3ª | 5th | |
| 1997–98 | 4 | 3ª | 6th | |
| 1998–99 | 4 | 3ª | 5th | |
| 1999–2000 | 4 | 3ª | 8th | |
| 2000–01 | 4 | 3ª | 9th | |

| Season | Tier | Division | Place | Copa del Rey |
|---|---|---|---|---|
| 2001–02 | 4 | 3ª | 6th (Note: Relegated as it acted as the third team of Sporting Gijón and Sporting Gijón B was relegated to Tercera División.) | N/A (Note: Second reserve team of Sporting Gijón.) |
| 2002–03 | 5 | Reg. Pref. | 2nd | |
| 2003–04 | 4 | 3ª | 13th | |
| 2004–05 | 4 | 3ª | 19th | |
| 2005–06 | 5 | Reg. Pref. | 3rd | |
| 2006–07 | 4 | 3ª | 20th | |
| 2007–08 | 5 | Reg. Pref. | 5th | |
| 2008–09 | 5 | Reg. Pref. | 8th | |
| 2009–10 | 5 | Reg. Pref. | 13th | |
| 2010–11 | 5 | Reg. Pref. | 16th | |
| 2011–12 | 5 | Reg. Pref. | (R) | |

- 39 seasons in Tercera División
