= Astur CF =

Spanish football club

Astur
- Full name: Astur Club de Fútbol
- Founded: 1923 (re-founded in 1949)
- Ground: Hermanos Llana, Oviedo, Asturias, Spain
- Capacity: 2,000
- President: Luismi Cabrales del Valle
- Head coach: Pablo Detori
- League: Tercera Federación – Group 2
- 2025–26: Primera Asturfútbol, 3rd of 19 (promoted)
Home colours	Away colours

Astur Club de Fútbol is a Spanish football team based in Oviedo, in the autonomous community of Asturias. Founded in 1923 and later re-founded in 1949, it plays in Tercera Federación – Group 2, holding home matches at Estadio Hermanos Llana, which has a capacity of 2,000 spectators.

== History ==
In 2003, Astur CF changed its name to Oviedo Astur Club de Fútbol (more commonly known as Oviedo ACF) and its colours to a blue shirt and white shorts, with the aim to substitute Real Oviedo, in that year relegated to Segunda División B and weeks later to Tercera División by financial debts.

After four seasons where Oviedo ACF played one time the promotion playoffs to Segunda División B, in 2007 the club decided to come back to the classical colours and denomination Astur CF.

== Season to season ==
Season	Level	Division	Place	Copa del Rey
1957–58	5	2ª Reg.	2nd	
1958–59	4	1ª Reg.	6th	
1959–60	4	1ª Reg.	15th	
1960–61	5	2ª Reg.	4th	
1961–62	5	2ª Reg.	2nd	
1962–63	4	1ª Reg.	5th	
1963–64	4	1ª Reg.	11th	
1964–65	4	1ª Reg.	14th	
1965–66	4	1ª Reg.	10th	
1966–67	4	1ª Reg.	16th	
1967–68	5	2ª Reg.	13th	
1968–69	5	2ª Reg.	1st	
1969–70	5	2ª Reg.	3rd	
1970–71	5	2ª Reg.	1st	
1971–72	4	1ª Reg.	15th	
1972–73	4	1ª Reg.	20th	
1973–74	5	2ª Reg. P.	12th	
1974–75	5	2ª Reg. P.	15th	
1975–76	5	2ª Reg. P.	19th	
1976–77	6	2ª Reg.	7th	

Season	Level	Division	Place	Copa del Rey
1977–78	7	2ª Reg.	2nd	
1978–79	6	1ª Reg.	16th	
1979–80	6	1ª Reg.	20th	
1980–81	7	2ª Reg.	11th	
1981–82	7	2ª Reg.	4th	
1982–83	7	2ª Reg.	4th	
1983–84	7	2ª Reg.	7th	
1984–85	7	2ª Reg.	1st	
1985–86	6	1ª Reg.	1st	
1986–87	5	Reg. Pref.	11th	
1987–88	5	Reg. Pref.	10th	
1988–89	5	Reg. Pref.	12th	
1989–90	5	Reg. Pref.	5th	
1990–91	5	Reg. Pref.	2nd	
1991–92	4	3ª	16th	
1992–93	4	3ª	15th	
1993–94	4	3ª	19th	
1994–95	5	Reg. Pref.	8th	
1995–96	5	Reg. Pref.	5th	
1996–97	4	3ª	20th	

Season	Level	Division	Place	Copa del Rey
1997–98	5	Reg. Pref.	5th	
1998–99	5	Reg. Pref.	2nd	
1999–2000	4	3ª	6th	
2000–01	4	3ª	5th	
2001–02	4	3ª	13th	
2002–03	4	3ª	8th	
2003–04	4	3ª	2nd	
2004–05	4	3ª	9th	
2005–06	4	3ª	6th	
2006–07	4	3ª	14th	
2007–08	4	3ª	15th	
2008–09	4	3ª	17th	
2009–10	4	3ª	20th	
2010–11	5	Reg. Pref.	19th	
2011–12	6	1ª Reg.	1st	
2012–13	5	Reg. Pref.	5th	
2013–14	5	Reg. Pref.	3rd	
2014–15	4	3ª	13th	
2015–16	4	3ª	19th	
2016–17	5	Reg. Pref.	13th	

Season	Level	Division	Place	Copa del Rey
2017–18	5	Reg. Pref.	7th	
2018–19	5	Reg. Pref.	11th	
2019–20	5	Reg. Pref.	7th	
2020–21	5	Reg. Pref.	5th	
2021–22	6	Reg. Pref.	4th	
2022–23	6	1ª RFFPA	8th	
2023–24	6	1ª Astur.	5th	
2024–25	6	1ª Astur.	6th	First round
2025–26	6	1ª Astur.	3rd	
2026–27	5	3ª Fed.		

- 17 seasons in Tercera División
- 1 season in Tercera Federación

== Notable former players ==
- (Spain) Berto
- (Spain) Francisco Castaño
- (Spain) Jaime Jordán
- (Spain) Dani López
- (Spain) Melendi

== Notable former coaches ==
- (Argentina) Enzo Ferrero
