= La Bañeza FC =

Association football club in Spain

La Bañeza
- Full name: La Bañeza Fútbol Club
- Nickname: La FC
- Founded: 1956
- Ground: La Llanera, La Bañeza, Castile and León, Spain
- Capacity: 3,000
- Chairman: Manuel Montiel Astorga
- Manager: José Díez
- League: Primera Regional – Group B
- 2025–26: Primera Regional – Group B, 3rd of 16
Home colours	Away colours

La Bañeza Fútbol Club is a Spanish football team based in La Bañeza, in the autonomous community of Castile and León. Founded in 1956 as La Bañeza Club de Fútbol, the club changed to its current name in 1984. It plays in Primera Regional – Group B, holding home matches at Estadio La Llanera.

== Season to season ==
Season	Tier	Division	Place	Copa del Rey
1956–1960	—	Regional	—	
1960–61	4	1ª Reg.	7th	
1961–62	4	1ª Reg.	1st	
1962–63	3	3ª	9th	
1963–64	3	3ª	6th	
1964–65	3	3ª	6th	
1965–66	3	3ª	7th	
1966–67	3	3ª	12th	
1967–68	3	3ª	11th	
1968–69	4	1ª Reg.	6th	
1969–70	4	1ª Reg.	3rd	
1970–71	3	3ª	20th	
1971–72	4	Reg. Pref.	8th	
1972–73	4	Reg. Pref.	8th	
1973–74	4	Reg. Pref.	6th	
1974–75	4	Reg. Pref.	11th	
1975–76	4	Reg. Pref.	13th	
1976–77	4	Reg. Pref.	12th	
1977–78	5	Reg. Pref.	11th	
1978–79	5	Reg. Pref.	13th	

Season	Tier	Division	Place	Copa del Rey
1979–80	5	Reg. Pref.	6th	
1980–81	4	3ª	17th	
1981–82	5	Reg. Pref.	2nd	
1982–83	4	3ª	9th	
1983–84	4	3ª	14th	
1984–85	4	3ª	19th	
1985–86	5	Reg. Pref.	8th	
1986–87	5	Reg. Pref.	5th	
1987–88	5	Reg. Pref.	4th	
1988–89	5	Reg. Pref.	1st	
1989–90	4	3ª	16th	
1990–91	4	3ª	11th	
1991–92	4	3ª	10th	
1992–93	4	3ª	10th	
1993–94	4	3ª	11th	
1994–95	4	3ª	11th	
1995–96	4	3ª	11th	
1996–97	4	3ª	10th	
1997–98	4	3ª	15th	
1998–99	4	3ª	10th	

Season	Tier	Division	Place	Copa del Rey
1999–2000	4	3ª	2nd	
2000–01	4	3ª	6th	
2001–02	4	3ª	6th	
2002–03	4	3ª	3rd	
2003–04	4	3ª	10th	
2004–05	4	3ª	17th	
2005–06	4	3ª	16th	
2006–07	4	3ª	20th	
2007–08	5	1ª Reg.	12th	
2008–09	5	1ª Reg.	11th	
2009–10	5	1ª Reg.	12th	
2010–11	5	1ª Reg.	14th	
2011–12	5	1ª Reg.	6th	
2012–13	5	1ª Reg.	1st	
2013–14	4	3ª	13th	
2014–15	4	3ª	11th	
2015–16	4	3ª	5th	
2016–17	4	3ª	12th	
2017–18	4	3ª	7th	
2018–19	4	3ª	15th	

Season	Tier	Division	Place	Copa del Rey
2019–20	4	3ª	18th	
2020–21	4	3ª	7th / 5th	
2021–22	6	1ª Reg.	9th	
2022–23	6	1ª Reg.	4th	
2023–24	6	1ª Reg.	5th	
2024–25	6	1ª Reg.	8th	
2025–26	6	1ª Reg.	3rd	
2026–27	6	1ª Reg.		

- 37 seasons in Tercera División
