= CD Universidad de Oviedo =

Spanish football team

Universidad de Oviedo
- Full name: Club Deportivo Universidad de Oviedo
- Nicknames: Uni, UniOvi
- Founded: 9 October 1961; 65 years ago
- Stadium: Estadio Universitario San Gregorio
- Capacity: 3,500
- Owner: University of Oviedo
- President: Ignacio Villaverde
- Head coach: Javier Gómez
- League: Primera Asturfútbol
- 2025–26: Primera Asturfútbol, 12th of 19
- Website: https://deportes.uniovi.es/competicion/federado
| Home colours | Away colours |

Club Deportivo Universidad de Oviedo is the football team of the University of Oviedo. Based in Oviedo, it was founded in 1961 and plays at Estadio Universitario San Gregorio, with a capacity of 3,500 seats.

== Club background ==
- Club Deportivo Universitario (1961–1970)
- Club Atlético Universitario (1970–1987)
- Asociación Deportiva Universidad de Oviedo (1987–2014)
- Club Deportivo Universidad de Oviedo (2014–present)

== Season to season ==
| Season | Level | Division | Place | Copa del Rey |
|---|---|---|---|---|
| 1970–71 | 5 | 2ª Reg. | | |
| 1971–72 | 5 | 2ª Reg. | | |
| 1972–73 | 5 | 2ª Reg. | | |
| 1973–74 | 4 | Reg. Pref. | 2nd | |
| 1974–75 | 3 | 3ª | 18th | First round |
| 1975–76 | 4 | Reg. Pref. | 5th | |
| 1976–77 | 4 | Reg. Pref. | 5th | |
| 1977–78 | 5 | Reg. Pref. | 7th | |
| 1978–79 | 5 | Reg. Pref. | 19th | |
| 1979–80 | 5 | Reg. Pref. | 13th | |
| 1980–81 | 5 | Reg. Pref. | 15th | |
| 1981–82 | 5 | Reg. Pref. | 20th | |
| 1982–83 | 6 | 1ª Reg. | 15th | |
| 1983–84 | 6 | 1ª Reg. | 13th | |
| 1984–85 | 6 | 1ª Reg. | 1st | |
| 1985–86 | 5 | Reg. Pref. | 18th | |
| 1986–87 | 5 | Reg. Pref. | 10th | |
| 1987–88 | 5 | Reg. Pref. | 7th | |
| 1988–89 | 5 | Reg. Pref. | 7th | |
| 1989–90 | 5 | Reg. Pref. | 2nd | |

| Season | Level | Division | Place | Copa del Rey |
|---|---|---|---|---|
| 1990–91 | 4 | 3ª | 13th | |
| 1991–92 | 4 | 3ª | 15th | |
| 1992–93 | 4 | 3ª | 19th | |
| 1993–94 | 5 | Reg. Pref. | 1st | |
| 1994–95 | 4 | 3ª | 9th | |
| 1995–96 | 4 | 3ª | 6th | |
| 1996–97 | 4 | 3ª | 6th | |
| 1997–98 | 4 | 3ª | 2nd | |
| 1998–99 | 4 | 3ª | 7th | |
| 1999–2000 | 4 | 3ª | 4th | |
| 2000–01 | 3 | 2ª B | 13th | |
| 2001–02 | 3 | 2ª B | 20th | |
| 2002–03 | 4 | 3ª | 5th | |
| 2003–04 | 4 | 3ª | 6th | |
| 2004–05 | 4 | 3ª | 8th | |
| 2005–06 | 4 | 3ª | 1st | |
| 2006–07 | 3 | 2ª B | 18th | First round |
| 2007–08 | 4 | 3ª | 4th | |
| 2008–09 | 4 | 3ª | 2nd | |
| 2009–10 | 4 | 3ª | 3rd | |

| Season | Level | Division | Place | Copa del Rey |
|---|---|---|---|---|
| 2010–11 | 4 | 3ª | 2nd | |
| 2011–12 | 4 | 3ª | 8th | |
| 2012–13 | 4 | 3ª | 2nd | |
| 2013–14 | 4 | 3ª | 7th | |
| 2014–15 | 4 | 3ª | 19th | |
| 2015–16 | 5 | Reg. Pref. | 15th | |
| 2016–17 | 5 | Reg. Pref. | 12th | |
| 2017–18 | 5 | Reg. Pref. | 3rd | |
| 2018–19 | 4 | 3ª | 19th | |
| 2019–20 | 5 | Reg. Pref. | 14th | |
| 2020–21 | 5 | Reg. Pref. | 22nd | |
| 2021–22 | 7 | 1ª Reg. | 1st | |
| 2022–23 | 6 | 1ª RFFPA | 17th | |
| 2023–24 | 6 | 1ª Astur. | 16th | |
| 2024–25 | 6 | 1ª Astur. | 7th | |
| 2025–26 | 6 | 1ª Astur. | | |

- 3 seasons in Segunda División B
- 23 seasons in Tercera División

== Honours ==
- Tercera División: 2005–06

== Notable players ==
- (Spain) Ian Mackay
