= 2007–08 Copa Federación de España =

Tournament details
- Country: Spain
- Teams: 80

Final positions
- Champions: Ourense
- Runner-up: Reus

Tournament statistics
- Matches played: 186
- Goals scored: 485 (2.61 per match)

The 2007–08 Copa Federación de España is the 15th staging of the Copa Federación de España, a knockout competition for Spanish football clubs in Segunda División B and Tercera División.

The competition began on 4 August 2007 and ended with the finals on 27 March and 3 April 2008.

== Andalusia tournament ==
=== Final ===
| Team 1 | Agg. | Team 2 | 1st leg | 2nd leg |
|---|---|---|---|---|
| Marbella (Andalusia) | 1–0 | (Andalusia) Roquetas | 1–0 | 0–0 |

== Asturias tournament ==
=== Qualifying tournament ===
==== Group A ====
| Team | Pld | W | D | L | GF | GA | GD | Pts |
|---|---|---|---|---|---|---|---|---|
| (Asturias) Tuilla | 4 | 3 | 0 | 1 | 4 | 4 | 0 | 9 |
| (Asturias) Marino | 4 | 2 | 0 | 2 | 7 | 5 | +2 | 6 |
| (Asturias) Ceares | 4 | 1 | 0 | 3 | 5 | 7 | -2 | 3 |

| | Cea | Mar | Tui |
| Ceares | | 3–0 | 0–1 |
| Marino | 4–1 | | 3–0 |
| Tuilla | 2–1 | 1–0 | |

==== Group B ====
| Team | Pld | W | D | L | GF | GA | GD | Pts |
|---|---|---|---|---|---|---|---|---|
| (Asturias) Siero | 4 | 3 | 0 | 1 | 8 | 4 | +4 | 9 |
| (Asturias) Universidad | 4 | 1 | 2 | 1 | 4 | 4 | 0 | 5 |
| (Asturias) Avilés | 4 | 0 | 2 | 2 | 2 | 6 | -4 | 2 |

| | Avi | Sie | Uni |
| Avilés | | 1–4 | 1–1 |
| Siero | 1–0 | | 1–2 |
| Universidad | 0–0 | 1–2 | |

==== Group C ====
| Team | Pld | W | D | L | GF | GA | GD | Pts |
|---|---|---|---|---|---|---|---|---|
| (Asturias) Langreo | 4 | 2 | 1 | 1 | 8 | 4 | +4 | 7 |
| (Asturias) Cudillero | 4 | 2 | 0 | 2 | 4 | 8 | -4 | 5 |
| (Asturias) Lealtad | 4 | 1 | 1 | 2 | 7 | 7 | 0 | 4 |

| | Cud | Lan | Lea |
| Cudillero | | 0–4 | 1–0 |
| Langreo | 0–1 | | 2–1 |
| Lealtad | 4–2 | 2–2 | |

==== Group D ====
| Team | Pld | W | D | L | GF | GA | GD | Pts |
|---|---|---|---|---|---|---|---|---|
| (Asturias) Oviedo | 4 | 3 | 0 | 1 | 6 | 4 | +2 | 9 |
| (Asturias) Ribadesella | 4 | 2 | 0 | 2 | 4 | 3 | +1 | 6 |
| (Asturias) Sporting B | 4 | 1 | 0 | 3 | 3 | 6 | -3 | 3 |

| | Ovi | Rib | SpB |
| Oviedo | | 1–0 | 2–1 |
| Ribadesella | 1–2 | | 2–0 |
| Sporting B | 2–1 | 0–1 | |

=== Semifinals ===
| Team 1 | Agg. | Team 2 | 1st leg | 2nd leg |
|---|---|---|---|---|
| Langreo (Asturias) | 2–1 | (Asturias) Real Oviedo | 0–0 | 2–1 |
| Tuilla (Asturias) | 3–3(a) | (Asturias) Siero | 2–0 | 1–3 |

=== Final ===
| Tuilla (Asturias) | 0 – 0 | (Asturias) Langreo |
Penalties
| | 3 – 2 |

== Aragon tournament ==
=== Quarter-finals ===
| Team 1 | Agg. | Team 2 | 1st leg | 2nd leg |
|---|---|---|---|---|
| Sabiñánigo (Aragon) | 2–2(a) | (Aragon) Monzón | 1–2 | 1–0 |
| Ejea (Aragon) | 4–2 | (Aragon) Barbastro | 3–2 | 1–0 |
| Andorra (Aragon) | 2–3 | (Aragon) Teruel | 2–1 | 0–2 |
| Figueruelas (Aragon) | 0–7 | (Aragon) Real Zaragoza B | 0–1 | 0–6 |

=== Semifinals ===
| Team 1 | Agg. | Team 2 | 1st leg | 2nd leg |
|---|---|---|---|---|
| Monzón (Aragon) | 4–7 | (Aragon) Ejea | 3–1 | 1–6 |
| Teruel (Aragon) | 0–1 | (Aragon) Real Zaragoza B | 0–1 | 0–0 |

=== Final ===
| Team 1 | Agg. | Team 2 | 1st leg | 2nd leg |
|---|---|---|---|---|
| Ejea (Aragon) | 0–0(p) | (Aragon) Real Zaragoza B | 0–0 | 0–0 |

== Balearic Islands tournament ==
=== Semifinals ===
| Team 1 | Agg. | Team 2 | 1st leg | 2nd leg |
|---|---|---|---|---|
| Margaritense (Balearic Islands) | 1–2 | (Balearic Islands) Binissalem | 1–2 | 0–0 |
| Poblense (Balearic Islands) | 2–2(p) | (Balearic Islands) Ferriolense | 1–1 | 1–1 |

=== Final ===
| Team 1 | Agg. | Team 2 | 1st leg | 2nd leg |
|---|---|---|---|---|
| Ferriolense (Balearic Islands) | 4–4(a) | (Balearic Islands) Binissalem | 1–1 | 3–3 |

== Canary Islands tournament ==
=== Semifinals ===
| Team 1 | Agg. | Team 2 | 1st leg | 2nd leg |
|---|---|---|---|---|
| Las Zocas (Canary Islands) | 4–3 | (Canary Islands) Laguna | 3–2 | 1–1 |
| Mensajero (Canary Islands) | 1–1(p) | (Canary Islands) Tijarafe | 1–0 | 0–1 |

=== Final ===
| Team 1 | Agg. | Team 2 | 1st leg | 2nd leg |
|---|---|---|---|---|
| Las Zocas (Canary Islands) | 2–2(a) | (Canary Islands) Tijarafe | 1–0 | 1–2 |

== Cantabria tournament ==
=== Qualifying round ===
| Team 1 | Agg. | Team 2 | 1st leg | 2nd leg |
|---|---|---|---|---|
| Siete Villas (Cantabria) | 2–7 | (Cantabria) Gimnástica | 0–5 | 2–2 |
| Tropezón (Cantabria) | 4–3 | (Cantabria) Reocín | 1–2 | 3–1 |

=== Semifinals ===
| Team 1 | Agg. | Team 2 | 1st leg | 2nd leg |
|---|---|---|---|---|
| Racing B (Cantabria) | 4–3 | (Cantabria) Gimnástica | 2–2 | 2–1 |
| Tropezón (Cantabria) | 2–0 | (Cantabria) Laredo | 1–0 | 1–0 |

=== Final ===
| Team 1 | Agg. | Team 2 | 1st leg | 2nd leg |
|---|---|---|---|---|
| Tropezón (Cantabria) | 0–4 | (Cantabria) Racing B | 0–2 | 0–2 |

== Castile and León tournament ==
=== Qualifying tournament ===
| Team 1 | Agg. | Team 2 | 1st leg | 2nd leg |
|---|---|---|---|---|
| Santa Marta (Castile and León) | 2–6 | (Castile and León) Guijuelo | 2–4 | 0–2 |
| Huracán Z (Castile and León) | 0–3 | (Castile and León) Cultural Leonesa | 0–1 | 0–2 |

=== Final ===
| Team | Pld | W | D | L | GF | GA | GD | Pts |
|---|---|---|---|---|---|---|---|---|
| (Castile and León) CD Laguna | 2 | 1 | 1 | 0 | 2 | 0 | +2 | 4 |
| (Castile and León) Guijuelo | 2 | 1 | 1 | 0 | 3 | 2 | +1 | 4 |
| (Castile and León) Cultural Leonesa | 2 | 0 | 0 | 2 | 2 | 5 | -3 | 0 |

== Catalonia tournament ==
=== Qualifying round ===
| Team 1 | Agg. | Team 2 | 1st leg | 2nd leg |
|---|---|---|---|---|
| Sabadell (Catalonia) | 2–2(p) | (Catalonia) Espanyol B | 2–0 | 0–2 |

=== Final ===
| Team 1 | Agg. | Team 2 | 1st leg | 2nd leg |
|---|---|---|---|---|
| Espanyol B (Catalonia) | 3–2 | (Catalonia) Gavà | 1–1 | 2–1 |

== Euskadi tournament ==
=== Final ===
| Team 1 | Agg. | Team 2 | 1st leg | 2nd leg |
|---|---|---|---|---|
| Zarautz (Basque Country (autonomous community)) | 1–4 | (Basque Country (autonomous community)) Amorebieta | 0–1 | 1–3 |

== Extremadura tournament ==
=== Final ===
| Team 1 | Agg. | Team 2 | 1st leg | 2nd leg |
|---|---|---|---|---|
| Díter Zafra (Extremadura) | 0–3 | (Extremadura) Don Benito | 0–1 | 0–2 |

== Galicia tournament ==
=== Qualifying round ===
| Team 1 | Agg. | Team 2 | 1st leg | 2nd leg |
|---|---|---|---|---|
| Cerceda (Galicia (Spain)) | 4–0 | (Galicia (Spain)) Villalonga | 0–0 | 4–0 |

=== Semifinals ===
| Team 1 | Agg. | Team 2 | 1st leg | 2nd leg |
|---|---|---|---|---|
| Órdenes (Galicia (Spain)) | 2–2(a) | (Galicia (Spain)) Ourense | 2–2 | 0–0 |
| Cerceda (Galicia (Spain)) | 3–1 | (Galicia (Spain)) Negreira | 2–1 | 1–0 |

=== Final ===
| Team 1 | Agg. | Team 2 | 1st leg | 2nd leg |
|---|---|---|---|---|
| Cerceda (Galicia (Spain)) | 1–2 | (Galicia (Spain)) Ourense | 1–1 | 0–1 |

== La Rioja tournament ==
=== Qualifying ===
| Calahorra (La Rioja) | 1 – 0 | (La Rioja) Oyonesa |

=== Semifinals ===
| Varea (La Rioja) | 0 – 6 | (La Rioja) ADF Logroñés |

| Calahorra (La Rioja) | 1 – 3 | (La Rioja) Anguiano |

=== Final ===
| ADF Logroñés (La Rioja) | 2 – 0 | (La Rioja) Anguiano |

== Madrid tournament ==
=== Qualifying tournament ===
==== Group A ====
| Team | Pld | W | D | L | GF | GA | GD | Pts |
|---|---|---|---|---|---|---|---|---|
| (Community of Madrid) Rayo B | 3 | 3 | 0 | 0 | 7 | 2 | +5 | 9 |
| (Community of Madrid) Rayo Majadahonda | 3 | 1 | 1 | 1 | 5 | 2 | +3 | 4 |
| (Community of Madrid) Las Rozas | 3 | 0 | 2 | 1 | 2 | 4 | -2 | 2 |
| (Community of Madrid) Alcobendas | 3 | 0 | 1 | 2 | 1 | 7 | -6 | 1 |

==== Group B ====
| Team | Pld | W | D | L | GF | GA | GD | Pts |
|---|---|---|---|---|---|---|---|---|
| (Community of Madrid) Real Madrid C | 4 | 3 | 1 | 0 | 8 | 3 | +5 | 9 |
| (Community of Madrid) Parla | 4 | 2 | 1 | 1 | 5 | 3 | +2 | 7 |
| (Community of Madrid) Leganés | 4 | 1 | 1 | 2 | 4 | 3 | +1 | 4 |
| (Community of Madrid) Ciempozuelos | 4 | 1 | 1 | 2 | 3 | 7 | -4 | 4 |
| (Community of Madrid) Puerta Bonita | 4 | 0 | 2 | 2 | 0 | 4 | -4 | 2 |

=== Final ===
| Team 1 | Agg. | Team 2 | 1st leg | 2nd leg |
|---|---|---|---|---|
| Rayo B (Community of Madrid) | 2–3 | (Community of Madrid) Real Madrid C | 1–1 | 1–2 |

== Murcia tournament ==
=== Qualifying tournament ===
==== Group A ====
| Team | Pld | W | D | L | GF | GA | GD | Pts |
|---|---|---|---|---|---|---|---|---|
| (Region of Murcia) Pinatar | 2 | 1 | 1 | 0 | 1 | 0 | +1 | 4 |
| (Region of Murcia) Bala Azul | 2 | 1 | 0 | 1 | 2 | 1 | +1 | 3 |
| (Region of Murcia) Caravaca | 2 | 0 | 1 | 1 | 0 | 2 | -2 | 1 |

==== Group B ====
| Team 1 | Agg. | Team 2 | 1st leg | 2nd leg |
|---|---|---|---|---|
| Imperial Promesas (Region of Murcia) | 0–5 | (Region of Murcia) Ciudad Lorquí | 0–3 | 0–2 |

=== Final ===
| Pinatar (Region of Murcia) | 3 – 1 | (Region of Murcia) Ciudad Lorquí |

== Navarre tournament ==
=== Qualifying tournament ===
==== Group A ====
| Team | Pld | W | D | L | GF | GA | GD | Pts |
|---|---|---|---|---|---|---|---|---|
| (Navarre) Oberena | 2 | 1 | 1 | 0 | 3 | 2 | +1 | 4 |
| (Navarre) Chantrea | 2 | 1 | 1 | 0 | 3 | 2 | +1 | 4 |
| (Navarre) Burdalés | 2 | 0 | 0 | 2 | 2 | 4 | -2 | 0 |

==== Group B ====
| Team | Pld | W | D | L | GF | GA | GD | Pts |
|---|---|---|---|---|---|---|---|---|
| (Navarre) Ardoi | 3 | 1 | 2 | 0 | 3 | 2 | +1 | 5 |
| (Navarre) Multivera | 3 | 1 | 1 | 1 | 4 | 3 | +1 | 4 |
| (Navarre) Huarte | 3 | 1 | 1 | 1 | 2 | 2 | 0 | 4 |
| (Navarre) Zarramonza | 3 | 1 | 0 | 2 | 2 | 4 | -2 | 3 |

=== Final ===
| Oberena (Navarre) | 2 – 1 | (Navarre) Ardoi |

== Valencia tournament ==
=== Final ===
| Team 1 | Agg. | Team 2 | 1st leg | 2nd leg |
|---|---|---|---|---|
| La Nucía (Valencian Community) | 3–0 | (Valencian Community) Elche Ilicitano | 1–0 | 2–0 |

== National tournament ==
=== National Qualifying round ===
| Team 1 | Agg. | Team 2 | 1st leg | 2nd leg |
|---|---|---|---|---|
| Tuilla (Asturias) | 5–4 | (Asturias) Caudal | 3–4 | 2–0 |
| Linares (Andalusia) | 7–1 | (Andalusia) Granada Atlético | 2–1 | 5–0 |

=== Round of 32 ===
| Team 1 | Agg. | Team 2 | 1st leg | 2nd leg |
|---|---|---|---|---|
| Real Madrid C (Community of Madrid) | 3–0 | (Castilla–La Mancha) Daimiel | 1–0 | 2–0 |
| Sestao (Basque Country (autonomous community)) | 0–6 | (Basque Country (autonomous community)) Lemona | 0–3 | 0–3 |
| Coruxo (Galicia (Spain)) | 4–5 | (Galicia (Spain)) Ourense | 3–2 | 1–3 |
| Racing B (Cantabria) | 6–4 | (Basque Country (autonomous community)) Zalla | 6–1 | 0–3 |
| Utebo (Aragon) | 3–4 | (Catalonia) Espanyol B | 3–1 | 0–3 |
| Noja (Cantabria) | 1–1 (p) | (Basque Country (autonomous community)) Amorebieta | 0–1 | 1–0 |
| Mirandés (Castile and León) | 2–3 | (La Rioja) ADF Logroñés | 0–3 | 2–0 |
| Haro (La Rioja) | 5–4 | (Navarre) Oberena | 2–2 | 3–2 |
| Las Zocas (Canary Islands) | 2–5 | (Balearic Islands) Ferriolense | 2–0 | 0–5 |
| Real Zaragoza B (Aragon) | 2–4 | (Catalonia) Reus | 1–3 | 1–1 |
| Mazarrón (Region of Murcia) | 4–4(a) | (Region of Murcia) Lorca | 1–1 | 3–3 |
| Tuilla (Asturias) | 3–1 | (Castile and León) CD Laguna | 2–0 | 1–1 |
| Linares (Andalusia) | 7–4 | (Region of Murcia) Pinatar | 2–1 | 5–3 |
| La Nucía (Valencian Community) | 2–3 | (Andalusia) Marbella | 0–1 | 2–2 |
| Alcalá (Community of Madrid) | 2–3 | (Community of Madrid) SS Reyes | 2–1 | 0–2 |
| Jerez (Andalusia) | 0–1 | (Extremadura) Don Benito | 0–0 | 0–1 |

=== Round of 16 ===
| Team 1 | Agg. | Team 2 | 1st leg | 2nd leg |
|---|---|---|---|---|
| Racing B (Cantabria) | 2–3 | (Cantabria) Noja | 2–1 | 0–2 |
| Espanyol B (Catalonia) | 13–0 | (La Rioja) ADF Logroñés | 2–0 | 11–0 |
| Real Madrid C (Community of Madrid) | 1–2 | (Community of Madrid) SS Reyes | 1–0 | 0–2 |
| Reus (Catalonia) | 3–0 | (La Rioja) Haro | 3–0 | 0–0 |
| Ferriolense (Balearic Islands) | 2–5 | (Galicia (Spain)) Ourense | 2–1 | 0–4 |
| Tuilla (Asturias) | 1–0 | (Basque Country (autonomous community)) Lemona | 0–0 | 1–0 |
| Marbella (Andalusia) | 1–0 | (Extremadura) Don Benito | 1–0 | 0–0 |
| Linares (Andalusia) | 3–5 | (Region of Murcia) Mazarrón | 1–1 | 2–4 |

=== Quarter-finals ===
| Team 1 | Agg. | Team 2 | 1st leg | 2nd leg |
|---|---|---|---|---|
| Mazarrón (Region of Murcia) | 1–0 | (Catalonia) Espanyol B | 1–0 | 0–0 |
| Marbella (Andalusia) | 0–2 | (Catalonia) Reus | 0–1 | 0–1 |
| SS Reyes (Community of Madrid) | 0–1 | (Asturias) Tuilla | 0–0 | 0–1 |
| Noja (Cantabria) | 0–3 | (Galicia (Spain)) Ourense | 0–2 | 0–1 |

=== Semifinals ===
| Team 1 | Agg. | Team 2 | 1st leg | 2nd leg |
|---|---|---|---|---|
| Mazarrón (Region of Murcia) | 1–2 | (Catalonia) Reus | 1–0 | 0–2 |
| Ourense (Galicia (Spain)) | 3–3(a) | (Asturias) Tuilla | 1–0 | 2–3 |

=== Final ===
| Team 1 | Agg. | Team 2 | 1st leg | 2nd leg |
|---|---|---|---|---|
| Ourense (Galicia (Spain)) | 3–2 | (Catalonia) Reus | 2–1 | 1-1 |
