= 2009–10 Copa Federación de España =

Tournament details
- Country: Spain
- Teams: 103

Final positions
- Champions: San Roque
- Runners-up: Lorca Deportiva

Tournament statistics
- Matches played: 201
- Goals scored: 525 (2.61 per match)

The 2009–10 Copa Federación de España was the 17th staging of the Copa Federación de España, a knockout competition for Spanish football clubs in Segunda División B and Tercera División.

The competition began on 1 August 2009 and ended with the finals on 24 March and 7 April 2010, where San Roque became champion after defeating Lorca Deportiva 3–0 on aggregate.

== Autonomous Communities tournaments ==
=== Aragon tournament ===
==== Quarter-finals ====
Team 1	Agg.	Team 2	1st leg	2nd leg
Sariñena	0–5	Teruel	0–1	0–4
Ejea	2–0	La Muela	1–0	1–0
Utebo	2–4	Barbastro	0–2	2–2
Calatayud	2–5	Andorra	2–1	0–4

==== Semifinals ====
Team 1	Agg.	Team 2	1st leg	2nd leg
Ejea	4–0	Andorra	1–0	3–0
Barbastro	0–1	Teruel	0–0	0–1

==== Final ====
Team 1	Agg.	Team 2	1st leg	2nd leg
Teruel	1–2	Ejea	1–1	0–1

=== Asturias tournament ===
==== Qualifying tournament ====
===== Group A =====
Team	Pld	W	D	L	GF	GA	GD	Pts
Marino	4	4	0	0	14	4	+10	12
Candás	4	2	0	2	7	8	−1	6
Avilés	4	0	0	4	5	14	−9	0

===== Group B =====
Team	Pld	W	D	L	GF	GA	GD	Pts
Llanes	4	2	1	1	7	9	−2	7
Langreo	4	1	2	1	8	4	+4	5
Lealtad	4	0	3	1	5	7	−2	3

===== Group C =====
Team	Pld	W	D	L	GF	GA	GD	Pts
Caudal	4	2	2	0	12	2	+10	8
Universidad Oviedo	4	1	1	2	7	10	−3	4
Gijón Industrial	4	1	1	2	3	10	−7	4

===== Group D =====
Team	Pld	W	D	L	GF	GA	GD	Pts
Cudillero	4	3	0	1	7	4	+3	9
Tuilla	4	2	0	2	4	5	−1	6
Sporting B	4	1	0	3	3	5	−2	3

==== Semifinals ====
Team 1	Agg.	Team 2	1st leg	2nd leg
Caudal	6–2	Cudillero	5–1	1–1
Marino	5–3	Llanes	4–2	1–1

==== Final ====
Team 1	Score	Team 2
Marino	3–2	Caudal

=== Balearic Islands tournament ===
==== Semifinals ====
Team 1	Agg.	Team 2	1st leg	2nd leg
Mallorca B	3–0	Binissalem	1–0	2–0
Ferriolense	0–5	Atlético Baleares	0–1	0–4

==== Final ====
Team 1	Agg.	Team 2	1st leg	2nd leg
Atlético Baleares	2–1	Mallorca B	1–0	1–1

=== Canary Islands tournament ===
==== First round ====
Team 1	Agg.	Team 2	1st leg	2nd leg
Los Llanos	2–3	Mensajero	1–1	1–2
Laguna	1–4	Tenerife B	1–3	0–1

==== Semifinal ====
Team 1	Agg.	Team 2	1st leg	2nd leg
Mensajero	2–3	Tenerife B	1–1	1–2

==== Final ====
Team 1	Agg.	Team 2	1st leg	2nd leg
Fuerteventura	3–6	Tenerife B	3–3	0–3

=== Cantabria tournament ===
==== Quarter-finals ====
Team 1	Agg.	Team 2	1st leg	2nd leg
Cayón	0–1	Castro	0–0	0–1
Ribamontán al Mar	3–6	Noja	3–1	0–5
Deva	2–2(a)	Laredo	1–0	1–2
Siete Villas	0–3	Racing B	0–2	0–1

==== Semifinals ====
Team 1	Agg.	Team 2	1st leg	2nd leg
Castro	3–1	Deva	1–1	2–0
Noja	2–0	Racing B	1–0	1–0

==== Final ====
Team 1	Agg.	Team 2	1st leg	2nd leg
Noja	6–5	Castro	2–1	4–4

=== Castile-La Mancha tournament ===
==== Semifinals ====
Team 1	Agg.	Team 2	1st leg	2nd leg
Almansa	5–3	Villarrobledo	4–1	1–2
Carranque	0–4	Tomelloso	0–1	0–3

==== Final ====
Team 1	Agg.	Team 2	1st leg	2nd leg
Tomelloso	3–3(a)	Almansa	2–2	1–1

=== Catalonia tournament ===
==== Final ====
Team 1	Agg.	Team 2	1st leg	2nd leg
Lleida	6–1	Gavà	4–0	2–1

=== Euskadi tournament ===
==== Final ====
Team	Pld	W	D	L	GF	GA	GD	Pts
Barakaldo	2	2	0	0	4	1	+3	6
Portugalete	2	1	0	1	2	3	−1	3
Leioa	2	0	0	2	2	4	−2	0

=== Extremadura tournament ===
==== First round ====
Team 1	Score	Team 2
Navalmoral	2–1	Villanovense
Fuente de Cantos	1–3	Jerez
Coria	2–4	Cacereño
La Albuera	0–4	Imperio de Mérida
Torviscal	4–1	Don Benito

==== Second round ====
Team 1	Score	Team 2
Torviscal	0–4	Jerez
Montehermoso	1–4	Cacereño
Navalmoral	0–4	Imperio de Mérida

==== Semifinal ====
Team 1	Score	Team 2
Cacereño	3–3(6–5 p)	Imperio de Mérida

==== Final ====
Team 1	Score	Team 2
Cacereño	0–0(3–4 p)	Jerez

=== Galicia tournament ===
==== Qualifying round ====
Team 1	Agg.	Team 2	1st leg	2nd leg
Ourense	1–3	Racing Ferrol	1–1	0–2

==== Semifinal ====
Team 1	Agg.	Team 2	1st leg	2nd leg
Montañeros	0–1	Racing Ferrol	0–0	0–1

==== Final ====
Team 1	Agg.	Team 2	1st leg	2nd leg
Cerceda	2–2(5–4 p)	Racing Ferrol	1–1	1–1

=== La Rioja tournament ===
==== Qualifying round ====
Team 1	Score	Team 2
Calahorra	1–0	River Ebro

==== Semifinals ====
Team 1	Score	Team 2
Haro	2–1	Calahorra
Alfaro	0–2	Anguiano

==== Final ====
Team 1	Score	Team 2
Haro	0–0(5–4 p)	Anguiano

=== Madrid tournament ===
==== Qualifying tournament ====
===== Group 1 =====
Team	Pld	W	D	L	GF	GA	GD	Pts
SS Reyes	3	2	1	0	5	1	+4	7
Galáctico Pegaso	3	2	0	1	6	3	+3	6
Real Madrid C	3	1	1	1	7	2	+5	4
Atl. Pinto	3	0	0	3	1	12	−11	0

===== Group 2 =====
Team	Pld	W	D	L	GF	GA	GD	Pts
Móstoles	3	2	1	0	4	0	+4	7
Rayo Vallecano B	3	2	0	1	3	1	+2	6
Colmenar Viejo	3	0	2	1	0	2	−2	2
Rayo Majadahonda	3	0	1	2	0	4	−4	1

==== Final ====
Team 1	Agg.	Team 2	1st leg	2nd leg
SS Reyes	4–4(a)	Móstoles	2–1	2–3

=== Murcia tournament ===
==== Quarter-finals ====
Team 1	Score	Team 2
Cartagena	1–1(6–5 p)	Mazarrón
Jumilla	1–0	Cieza
Edeco Fortuna	2–0	Plus Ultra
Atl. Pulpileño	3–0	Lumbreras

==== Semifinals ====
Team 1	Score	Team 2
Edeco Fortuna	1–2	Jumilla
Atl. Pulpileño	3–0	Cartagena

==== Final ====
Team 1	Score	Team 2
Jumilla	2–1	Atl. Pulpileño

=== Navarre tournament ===
==== Final ====
Team	Pld	W	D	L	GF	GA	GD	Pts
Oberena	2	2	0	0	2	0	+2	6
Valle de Egüés	2	1	0	1	3	2	+1	3
Zarramonza	2	0	0	2	1	4	−3	0

=== Valencia tournament ===
==== Semifinals ====
Team 1	Agg.	Team 2	1st leg	2nd leg
Benidorm	4–2	Crevillente	1–1	3–1
Torrevieja	2–5	Torrellano	1–3	1–2

==== Final ====
Team 1	Agg.	Team 2	1st leg	2nd leg
Benidorm	5–5(a)	Torrellano	4–3	1–2

== National tournament ==
=== National Qualifying round ===
Team 1	Agg.	Team 2	1st leg	2nd leg
Izarra (Navarre)	2–3	(Navarre) Oberena	0–0	2–3
Compostela (Galicia (Spain))	2–4	(Galicia (Spain)) Cerceda	0–2	2–2
Ejea (Aragon)	1–7	(Aragon) Monzón	1–3	0–4

=== Round of 32 ===
Team 1	Agg.	Team 2	1st leg	2nd leg
San Roque (Andalusia)	3–3(a)	(Extremadura) Jerez	1–1	2–2
Cerceda (Galicia (Spain))	2–3	(Castile and León) Villaralbo	2–1	0–2
Almansa (Castilla–La Mancha)	4–4(a)	(Valencian Community) Torrellano	2–1	2–3
Haro (La Rioja)	1–6	(Asturias) Marino	1–2	0–4
Atlético Baleares (Balearic Islands)	0–4	(Balearic Islands) Sporting Mahonés	0–3	0–1
Monzón (Aragon)	2–1	(Cantabria) Noja	1–0	1–1
Barakaldo (Basque Country (autonomous community))	2–1	(Basque Country (autonomous community)) Lemona	1–0	1–1
Lleida (Catalonia)	2–4	(Catalonia) Gramenet	0–2	2–2
Jumilla (Region of Murcia)	1–3	(Andalusia) Roquetas	1–1	0–2
Tenisca (Canary Islands)	2–7	(Castilla–La Mancha) Toledo	1–0	1–7
Gimnástica Torrelavega (Cantabria)	1–2	(La Rioja) Logroñés	1–1	0–1
Oberena (Navarre)	1–8	(Basque Country (autonomous community)) Alavés	0–1	1–7
Caravaca (Region of Murcia)	2–3	(Region of Murcia) Lorca Deportiva	0–0	2–3
Tenerife B (Canary Islands)	1–2	(Community of Madrid) SS Reyes	1–1	0–1
Alcalá (Community of Madrid)	1–2	(Community of Madrid) Leganés	0–0	1–2
Real Jaén (Andalusia)	1–1(2–3 p)	(Andalusia) Alcalá Guadaíra	1–0	0–1

=== Round of 16 ===
Team 1	Agg.	Team 2	1st leg	2nd leg
San Roque (Andalusia)	4–3	(Andalusia) Roquetas	1–2	3–1
Barakaldo (Basque Country (autonomous community))	2–1	(Basque Country (autonomous community)) Alavés	1–0	1–1
Marino (Asturias)	4–3	(La Rioja) Logroñés	2–1	2–2
Gramenet (Catalonia)	2–1	(Aragon) Monzón	1–1	1–0
Almansa (Castilla–La Mancha)	3–3(5–3 p)	(Balearic Islands) Sporting Mahonés	2–1	1–2
Villaralbo (Castile and León)	4–0	(Castilla–La Mancha) Toledo	2–0	2–0
Leganés (Community of Madrid)	1–2	(Community of Madrid) SS Reyes	1–1	0–1
Alcalá Guadaíra (Andalusia)	1–5	(Region of Murcia) Lorca Deportiva	1–1	0–4

=== Quarterfinals ===
Team 1	Agg.	Team 2	1st leg	2nd leg
Marino (Asturias)	3–4	(Basque Country (autonomous community)) Barakaldo	3–2	0–2
Villaralbo (Castile and León)	2–3	(Community of Madrid) SS Reyes	2–1	0–2
San Roque (Andalusia)	2–0	(Castilla–La Mancha) Almansa	2–0	0–0
Gramenet (Catalonia)	2–3	(Region of Murcia) Lorca Deportiva	2–2	0–1

=== Semifinals ===
Team 1	Agg.	Team 2	1st leg	2nd leg
San Roque (Andalusia)	2–2(4–2 p)	(Basque Country (autonomous community)) Barakaldo	1–1	1–1
Lorca Deportiva (Region of Murcia)	1–0	(Community of Madrid) SS Reyes	0–0	1–0

=== Final ===
Team 1	Agg.	Team 2	1st leg	2nd leg
Lorca Deportiva (Region of Murcia)	0–3	(Andalusia) San Roque	0–1	0–2
