= 2008–09 Copa Federación de España =

Tournament details
- Country: Spain
- Teams: 102

Final positions
- Champions: Real Jaén
- Runner-up: Rayo Vallecano B

Tournament statistics
- Matches played: 196
- Goals scored: 521 (2.66 per match)

The 2008–09 Copa Federación de España was the 16th staging of the Copa Federación de España, a knockout competition for Spanish football clubs in Segunda División B and Tercera División.

The competition began on 2 August 2008 and ended with the finals on 2 April and 15 April 2009, where Real Jaén became champion after defeating Rayo Vallecano B 4-1 on aggregate.

== Autonomous Communities tournaments ==
=== Andalusia tournament ===
==== Final ====
Team 1	Agg.	Team 2	1st leg	2nd leg
Marbella	1–6	Real Jaén	0–2	1–4

=== Asturias tournament ===
==== Qualifying tournament ====
===== Group A =====
Team	Pld	W	D	L	GF	GA	GD	Pts
Ceares	4	2	2	0	5	3	+2	8
Caudal	4	1	1	2	3	4	-1	4
Tuilla	4	0	3	1	1	2	-1	3

	Cau	Cea	Tui
Caudal		2–3	0–0
Ceares	1–0		1–1
Tuilla	0–1	0–0	

===== Group B =====
Team	Pld	W	D	L	GF	GA	GD	Pts
Langreo	4	2	1	1	7	3	+4	7
Llanes	4	2	0	2	2	2	0	6
Universidad Oviedo	4	1	1	2	3	7	-4	4

	Lan	Lla	Uni
Langreo		0–1	5–1
Llanes	0–1		0–1
Uni	1–1	0–1	

===== Group C =====
Team	Pld	W	D	L	GF	GA	GD	Pts
Marino	4	3	1	0	9	3	+6	10
Ribadesella	4	1	1	2	4	7	-3	4
Lealtad	4	1	0	3	7	10	-3	3

	Lea	Mar	Rib
Lealtad		1–4	1–3
Marino	1–2		2–1
Ribadesella	0–4	3–1	

===== Group D =====
Team	Pld	W	D	L	GF	GA	GD	Pts
Sporting B	4	3	0	1	9	5	+4	9
Avilés	4	2	0	2	6	7	-1	6
Cudillero	4	1	0	3	2	5	-3	3

	Avi	Cud	SpB
Avilés		0–2	3–4
Cudillero	0–1		0–2
Sporting B	1–2	2–0	

==== Semifinals ====
Team 1	Agg.	Team 2	1st leg	2nd leg
Marino	4–2	Sporting B	2–0	2–2
Ceares	2–3	Langreo	1–2	1–1

==== Final ====
Langreo	1 – 0	Marino

=== Aragon tournament ===
==== Quarter-finals ====
Team 1	Agg.	Team 2	1st leg	2nd leg
Sariñena	0–7	Real Zaragoza B	0–4	0–3
Andorra	2–4	Teruel	2–3	0–1
Monzón	6–3	Calatayud	4–2	2–1
Villanueva	2–0	Barbastro	1–0	1–0

==== Semifinals ====
Team 1	Agg.	Team 2	1st leg	2nd leg
Villanueva	1–3	Monzón	1–2	0–1
Real Zaragoza B	2–2(a)	Teruel	1–0	1–2

==== Final ====
Team 1	Agg.	Team 2	1st leg	2nd leg
Monzón	2–2(a)	Real Zaragoza B	1–2	1–0

=== Balearic Islands tournament ===
==== Semifinals ====
Team 1	Agg.	Team 2	1st leg	2nd leg
Binissalem	3–2	Constancia	1–1	2–1
Ferriolense	1–5	Mallorca B	1–2	0–3

==== Final ====
Team 1	Agg.	Team 2	1st leg	2nd leg
Binissalem	3–4	Mallorca B	2–2	1-2

=== Canary Islands tournament ===
==== Semifinals ====
Team 1	Agg.	Team 2	1st leg	2nd leg
Tenerife B	3–2	Tenisca	3–0	0–2
Laguna	3–1	Las Zocas	1–0	2–1

==== Final ====
Team 1	Agg.	Team 2	1st leg	2nd leg
Laguna	4–1	Tenerife B	2–1	2–0

=== Cantabria tournament ===
==== Semifinals ====
Team 1	Agg.	Team 2	1st leg	2nd leg
Noja	4–1	Laredo	4–0	0–1
Racing B	6–0	Ribamontán	3–0	3–0

==== Final ====
Team 1	Agg.	Team 2	1st leg	2nd leg
Noja	2–3	Racing B	0–0	2–3

=== Castile and León tournament ===
==== Qualifying round ====
Astorga	0 – 4	Palencia

==== Semifinals ====
Palencia	0 – 1	Huracán Z

Burgos	1 – 0	Guijuelo

==== Final ====
Burgos	2 – 1	Huracán Z

=== Castile-La Mancha tournament ===
==== Quarter-finals ====
Team 1	Agg.	Team 2	1st leg	2nd leg
Piedrabuena	0–0(p)	Alcázar	0–0	0–0
Daimiel	3–1	Villarrobledo	1–1	2–0
Criptanense	4–6	Almansa	2–2	2–4

==== Semifinals ====
Team 1	Agg.	Team 2	1st leg	2nd leg
Tomelloso	3–5	Almansa	2–2	1–3
Daimiel	2–2(a)	Piedrabuena	1–2	1–0

==== Final ====
Team 1	Agg.	Team 2	1st leg	2nd leg
Almansa	3–2	Piedrabuena	2–2	1–0

=== Catalonia tournament ===
==== Qualifying round ====
Team 1	Agg.	Team 2	1st leg	2nd leg
Sabadell	2–3	Espanyol B	2–0	0–3

==== Final ====
Team 1	Agg.	Team 2	1st leg	2nd leg
Miapuesta	0–7	Espanyol B	0–2	0–5

=== Euskadi tournament ===
==== Final ====
Team	Pld	W	D	L	GF	GA	GD	Pts
Leioa	2	2	0	0	5	1	+4	6
Gernika	2	1	0	1	2	2	0	3
Amurrio	2	0	0	2	1	5	-4	0

=== Extremadura tournament ===
==== Qualifying round ====
Talavera	0 – 2	UD Badajoz

Santa Marta	1 – 1 (p)	Jerez

Extremadura	0 – 3	Díter Zafra

Ciudad de Trujillo	1 – 2	CD Badajoz

Ciudad de Plasencia	3 – 1	Cacereño

Gimnástico Don Benito	0 – 1	Villanovense

==== Quarterfinals ====
Villanovense	5 – 0	Ciudad de Plasencia

Jerez	1 – 1 (p) 3-4	CD Badajoz

UD Badajoz	1 – 0	Díter Zafra

==== Semifinal ====
CD Badajoz	1 – 3	UD Badajoz

==== Final ====
Villanovense	0 – 1	UD Badajoz

=== Galicia tournament ===
==== Qualifying round ====
Team 1	Agg.	Team 2	1st leg	2nd leg
Cerceda	2–3	Narón	1–0	1–3

==== Semifinals ====
Team 1	Agg.	Team 2	1st leg	2nd leg
Narón	0–7	Lalín	0–1	0–6
Villalonga	1–3	Coruxo	0–3	1–0

==== Final ====
Team 1	Agg.	Team 2	1st leg	2nd leg
Lalín	1–2	Coruxo	1–0	0–2

=== La Rioja tournament ===
==== Semifinals ====
Calahorra	1 – 1 (p) 3-5	Haro

Anguiano	1 – 1 (p) 4-3	Agoncillo

==== Final ====
Haro	4 – 0	Anguiano

=== Madrid tournament ===
==== Final ====
Team	Pld	W	D	L	GF	GA	GD	Pts
Rayo B	2	2	0	0	6	2	+4	6
Leganés	2	1	0	1	3	5	-2	3
SS Reyes	2	0	0	2	2	4	-2	0

=== Murcia tournament ===
==== Quarter-finals ====
Team 1	Agg.	Team 2	1st leg	2nd leg
Jumilla	3–3(a)	Cieza	2–0	1–3
Ciudad de Lorca	5–7	Lorca B	4–4	1–3
Bala Azul	2–4	Pinatar	1–2	1–2
Pozo Estrecho	0–2	Plus Ultra	0–1	0–1

==== Semifinals ====
Team 1	Agg.	Team 2	1st leg	2nd leg
Pinatar	1–2	Jumilla	0–0	1–2
Plus Ultra	4–5	Lorca B	3–2	1–3

==== Final ====
Jumilla	0 – 1	Lorca B

=== Navarre tournament ===
==== Qualifying tournament ====
===== Group A =====
Team	Pld	W	D	L	GF	GA	GD	Pts
Valle de Egüés	2	2	0	0	7	0	+7	6
Oberena	2	1	0	1	2	5	-3	3
Multivera	2	0	0	2	1	5	-4	0

===== Group B =====
Team 1	Agg.	Team 2	1st leg	2nd leg
Ardoi	2–2(a)	Peña Azagresa	1–0	1–2

==== Final ====
Valle de Egüés	0 – 2	Ardoi

=== Valencia tournament ===
==== Semifinal ====
Team 1	Agg.	Team 2	1st leg	2nd leg
Villarreal B	3–0	Gandía	2–0	1–0

==== Final ====
Team 1	Agg.	Team 2	1st leg	2nd leg
Villajoyosa	2–3	Villarreal B	1–1	1–2

== National tournament ==
=== National Qualifying round ===
Team 1	Agg.	Team 2	1st leg	2nd leg
Mallorca B (Balearic Islands)	2–1	(Balearic Islands) Atl.Baleares	2–0	0–1
Racing B (Cantabria)	2–1	(Basque Country (autonomous community)) Leioa	0–0	2–1
Rayo Vallecano B (Community of Madrid)	2–0	(Community of Madrid) Ciempozuelos	2–0	0–0
Haro (La Rioja)	2–5	(Castile and León) Mirandés	1–2	1–3
Granadilla (Canary Islands)	2–0	(Canary Islands) Laguna	1–0	1–0

=== Round of 32 ===
Team 1	Agg.	Team 2	1st leg	2nd leg
Racing Ferrol (Galicia (Spain))	7–5	(Galicia (Spain)) Pontevedra	5–1	2–4
Ciudad Santiago (Galicia (Spain))	1–2	(Galicia (Spain)) Lugo	1–0	0–2
Coruxo (Galicia (Spain))	1–3	(Galicia (Spain)) Ourense	0–0	1–3
Mirandés (Castile and León)	3–4	(Castile and León) Burgos	3–0	0–4
Racing B (Cantabria)	0–2	(Asturias) Langreo	0–0	0–2
Ardoi (Navarre)	2–3	(Cantabria) Gimn. Torrelavega	2–3	0–0
Izarra (Navarre)	3–4	(Aragon) Ejea	1–2	2–2
Zaragoza B (Aragon)	3–1	(Balearic Islands) Mallorca B	3–0	0–1
Villarreal B (Valencian Community)	2–2(a)	(Catalonia) Espanyol B	2–1	0–1
Almansa (Castilla–La Mancha)	3–1	(Region of Murcia) Atl.Ciudad	2–0	1–1
Lorca B (Region of Murcia)	3–4	(Region of Murcia) Águilas	3–2	0–2
Linares (Andalusia)	1–4	(Andalusia) Real Jaén	1–1	0–3
Villanueva (Andalusia)	2–3	(Extremadura) UD Badajoz	1–0	1–3
Granada (Andalusia)	3–3(a)	(Andalusia) Cádiz	0–1	3–2
San Fernando (Andalusia)	2–3	Ceuta	2–2	0–1
Granadilla (Canary Islands)	1–4	(Community of Madrid) Rayo Vallecano B	1–1	0–3

=== Round of 16 ===
Team 1	Agg.	Team 2	1st leg	2nd leg
Águilas (Region of Murcia)	0–4	(Catalonia) Espanyol B	0–1	0–3
Almansa (Castilla–La Mancha)	2–4	(Community of Madrid) Rayo Vallecano B	1–2	1–2
Racing Ferrol (Galicia (Spain))	8–2	(Asturias) Langreo	6–0	2–2
Zaragoza B (Aragon)	0–2	(Cantabria) Gimn. Torrelavega	0–1	0–1
Granada (Andalusia)	2–1	(Extremadura) UD Badajoz	2–0	0–1
Lugo (Galicia (Spain))	1–3	(Galicia (Spain)) Ourense	1–2	0–1
Ceuta	1–2	(Andalusia) Real Jaén	0–2	1–0
Ejea (Aragon)	2–4	(Castile and León) Burgos	2–4	0–0

=== Quarterfinals ===
Team 1	Agg.	Team 2	1st leg	2nd leg
Gimn. Torrelavega (Cantabria)	3–4	(Galicia (Spain)) Racing Ferrol	1–3	2–1
Burgos (Castile and León)	0–0 (4–5 p)	(Galicia (Spain)) Ourense	0–0	0–0
Real Jaén (Andalusia)	5–2	(Andalusia) Granada	1–0	4–2
Espanyol B (Catalonia)	2–3	(Community of Madrid) Rayo Vallecano B	1–2	1–1

=== Semifinals ===
Team 1	Agg.	Team 2	1st leg	2nd leg
Rayo Vallecano B (Community of Madrid)	2–0	(Galicia (Spain)) Racing Ferrol	0–0	2–0
Ourense (Galicia (Spain))	1–3	(Andalusia) Real Jaén	1–2	0–1

=== Final ===
Team 1	Agg.	Team 2	1st leg	2nd leg
Real Jaén (Andalusia)	4–1	(Community of Madrid) Rayo Vallecano B	0–0	4–1
