= 2011–12 Copa Federación de España =

Tournament details
- Country: Spain
- Teams: 110

Final positions
- Champions: Binissalem
- Runner-up: Lemona

Tournament statistics
- Matches played: 203
- Goals scored: 559 (2.75 per match)

The 2011–12 Copa Federación de España is the 19th staging of the Copa Federación de España, a knockout competition for Spanish football clubs in Segunda División B and Tercera División.

The competition began on 3 August 2011 and ended with the finals on 12 April and 19 April 2012, where Binissalem became champion after defeating Lemona on away goals after a 6–6 aggregate.

== Autonomous Communities tournaments ==
=== Andalusia tournament ===
==== Final ====
Team 1	Agg.	Team 2	1st leg	2nd leg
Almería B	4–3	Loja	2–1	2–2

=== Aragon tournament ===
==== First round ====
Team 1	Agg.	Team 2	1st leg	2nd leg
Villanueva	(a) 1–1	Zaragoza B	0–0	1–1
Binéfar	0–3	Barbastro	–	–
Calatayud	2–1	Utebo	0–0	1–2

==== Semifinals ====
Team 1	Agg.	Team 2	1st leg	2nd leg
Villanueva	1–2	Barbastro	1–2	0–0
Calatayud	3–4	Teruel	0–0	3–4

==== Final ====
Team 1	Agg.	Team 2	1st leg	2nd leg
Barbastro	0–6	Teruel	0–4	0–2

=== Asturias tournament ===
==== Qualifying tournament ====
===== Group A =====
Team	Pld	W	D	L	GF	GA	GD	Pts
Tuilla	4	2	1	1	6	5	+1	7
Real Avilés	4	1	2	1	5	5	0	5
Universidad Oviedo	4	1	1	2	5	6	–1	4

	Avi	Tui	Uni
Real Avilés		0–0	2–1
Tuilla	3–2		2–3
Universidad Oviedo	1–1	0–1	

===== Group B =====
Team	Pld	W	D	L	GF	GA	GD	Pts
Caudal	4	3	1	0	12	6	+6	10
Navarro	4	1	1	2	8	9	–1	4
Navia	4	1	0	3	3	8	–5	3

	Cau	Nav	Nvi
Caudal		4–2	3–0
Navarro	3–3		2–0
Navia	1–2	2–1	

===== Group C =====
Team	Pld	W	D	L	GF	GA	GD	Pts
Condal	4	2	1	1	4	3	+1	7
Candás	4	1	2	1	7	5	+2	5
Oviedo Vetusta	4	1	1	2	5	8	–3	4

	Can	Con	Ovi
Candás		0–1	3–0
Condal	1–1		2–1
Oviedo Vetusta	3–3	1–0	

===== Group D =====
Team	Pld	W	D	L	GF	GA	GD	Pts
Langreo	4	3	1	0	6	2	+4	10
Sporting B	4	1	2	1	5	5	0	5
Cudillero	4	0	1	3	4	8	–4	1

	Cud	Lan	SpgB
Cudillero		0–1	2–2
Langreo	3–1		1–1
Sporting B	2–1	0–1	

==== Semifinals ====
Team 1	Agg.	Team 2	1st leg	2nd leg
Tuilla	5–1	Caudal	5–0	0–1
Condal	2–3	Langreo	1–1	1–2

==== Final ====
Team 1	Score	Team 2
Tuilla	1–0	Langreo

=== Balearic Islands tournament ===
==== Semifinals ====
Team 1	Agg.	Team 2	1st leg	2nd leg
Poblense	1–4	Mallorca B	0–2	1–2
Constancia	3–3 (2–4 p)	Binissalem	2–1	1–2

==== Final ====
Team 1	Agg.	Team 2	1st leg	2nd leg
Binissalem	4–3	Mallorca B	2–2	2–1

=== Canary Islands tournament ===
==== Final ====
Team 1	Agg.	Team 2	1st leg	2nd leg
Atlético Granadilla	1–3	Tenerife B	1–2	0–1

=== Cantabria tournament ===
==== First round ====
Team 1	Agg.	Team 2	1st leg	2nd leg
Siete Villas	4–2	Buelna	1–1	3–1
Cayón	1–4	Rayo Cantabria	1–0	0–4
Arenas de Frajanas	0–9	Gimn. Torrelavega	0–4	0–5

==== Semifinals ====
Team 1	Agg.	Team 2	1st leg	2nd leg
Siete Villas	5–2	Rayo Cantabria	2–2	3–0
Racing B	2–0	Gimn. Torrelavega	1–0	1–0

==== Final ====
Team 1	Agg.	Team 2	1st leg	2nd leg
Racing B	4–1	Siete Villas	3–0	1–1

=== Castile and León tournament ===
==== Finals ====
Team	Pld	W	D	L	GF	GA	GD	Pts
Gimnástica Segoviana	2	2	0	0	6	3	+3	6
Arandina	2	1	0	1	3	3	0	3
Zamora	2	0	0	2	2	5	–3	0

	Ara	Gim	Zam
Arandina			2–0
Gimnástica Segoviana	3–1		
Zamora		2–3	

=== Castile-La Mancha tournament ===
==== Semifinals ====
Team 1	Agg.	Team 2	1st leg	2nd leg
Villarrobledo	4–1	Tomelloso	2–0	2–1
Almansa	0–1	La Roda	0–1	–

==== Final ====
Team 1	Agg.	Team 2	1st leg	2nd leg
Villarrobledo	3–2	Almansa	2–1	1–1

=== Catalonia tournament ===
==== Final ====
Team 1	Agg.	Team 2	1st leg	2nd leg
Santboià	2–1	Pobla Mafumet	2–0	0–1

=== Euskadi tournament ===
==== Finals ====
Team	Pld	W	D	L	GF	GA	GD	Pts
Lemona	2	1	1	0	2	1	+1	4
Zalla	2	0	2	0	3	3	0	2
Arenas de Getxo	2	0	1	1	2	3	–1	1

	Are	Lem	Zal
Arenas de Getxo			2–2
Lemona	1–0		
Zalla		1–1	

=== Extremadura tournament ===
==== First round ====
Team 1	Score	Team 2
Alburquerque	0–3	Pueblonuevo
Herrera	2–1	Don Benito
Llerenense	0–4	Jerez

==== Semifinal ====
Team 1	Score	Team 2
Herrera	1–1(5–4 p)	Pueblonuevo

==== Final ====
Team 1	Score	Team 2
Herrera	0–3	Jerez

=== Galicia tournament ===
==== First round ====
Team 1	Agg.	Team 2	1st leg	2nd leg
Pontevedra	3–4	Ourense	2–1	1–3

==== Semifinals ====
Team 1	Agg.	Team 2	1st leg	2nd leg
Racing Ferrol	(a) 3–3	Montañeros	1–0	2–3
Coruxo	0–0 (6–5 p)	Ourense	0–0	0–0

==== Final ====
Team 1	Score	Team 2
Racing Ferrol	1–1 (3–4 p)	Coruxo

=== La Rioja tournament ===
==== Semifinals ====
Team 1	Score	Team 2
Alfaro	1–2	Oyonesa
Haro	1–3	SD Logroñés

==== Final ====
Team 1	Score	Team 2
Oyonesa	2–3	SD Logroñés

=== Madrid tournament ===
==== Qualifying tournament ====
===== Group 1 =====
Team	Pld	W	D	L	GF	GA	GD	Pts
Rayo Vallecano B	6	4	1	1	19	7	+12	13
Internacional	6	3	2	1	9	4	+5	11
Real Madrid C	6	2	1	3	10	12	–2	7
Móstoles	6	1	0	5	5	20	–15	3

	Mós	Int	RVaB	MadC
Móstoles		0–1	3–2	1–3
Internacional	3–0		1–1	2–0
Rayo Vallecano B	6–1	2–1		5–0
Real Madrid C	5–0	1–1	1–3	

===== Group 2 =====
Team	Pld	W	D	L	GF	GA	GD	Pts
SS Reyes	4	3	1	0	9	4	+5	10
Atl. Pinto	4	1	1	2	6	7	–1	4
Carabanchel	4	1	0	3	5	9	–4	3

	Pin	Car	SSR
Atl. Pinto		4–1	1–1
Carabanchel	2–0		1–3
SS Reyes	3–1	2–1	

==== Final ====
Team 1	Score	Team 2
Rayo Vallecano B	4–2	SS Reyes

=== Murcia tournament ===
==== Qualifying tournament ====
===== Group A =====
Team	Pld	W	D	L	GF	GA	GD	Pts
Atl. Pulpileño	2	1	1	0	1	0	+1	4
Lorca Atl.	2	0	2	0	1	1	0	2
Águilas	2	0	1	1	1	2	–1	1

	Águ	Pul	Lor
Águilas			1–1
Atl. Pulpileño	1–0		
Lorca Atl.		0–0	

===== Group B =====
Team	Pld	W	D	L	GF	GA	GD	Pts
La Unión	2	1	1	0	1	0	+1	4
Bala Azul	2	0	2	0	1	1	0	2
Cartagena	2	0	1	1	1	2	–1	1

	Bal	Car	LaU
Bala Azul			0–0
Cartagena	1–1		
La Unión		1–0	

===== Group C =====
Team 1	Score	Team 2
Fortuna	1–2	Plus Ultra

===== Group D =====
Team 1	Score	Team 2
Molina	1–0	Cieza

==== Semifinals ====
Team 1	Score	Team 2
La Unión	2–1	Molina
Atl. Pulpileño	3–2	Plus Ultra

==== Final ====
Team 1	Score	Team 2
Atl. Pulpileño	2–1	La Unión

=== Navarre tournament ===
==== Semifinals ====
Team 1	Agg.	Team 2	1st leg	2nd leg
Peña Sport	3–1	Oberena	2–0	1–1
Azkoyen	(a) 3–3	Murchante	1–1	2–2

==== Final ====
Team 1	Agg.	Team 2	1st leg	2nd leg
Azkoyen	2–6	Peña Sport	2–2	0–4

=== Valencia tournament ===
==== First round ====
Team 1	Agg.	Team 2	1st leg	2nd leg
Atl. Saguntino	1–3	Acero	1–1	0–2
Ontinyent	5–0	Llosa	3–0	2–0
Jove Español	4–5	Catarroja	3–3	1–2

==== Semifinals ====
Team 1	Agg.	Team 2	1st leg	2nd leg
Ontinyent	6–1	Altea	3–0	3–1
Catarroja	4–2	Acero	1–1	3–1

==== Final ====
Team 1	Agg.	Team 2	1st leg	2nd leg
Ontinyent	3–0	Catarroja	2–0	1–0

== National tournament ==
=== National Qualifying round ===
Team 1	Agg.	Team 2	1st leg	2nd leg
Tenerife B (Canary Islands)	3–4	(Canary Islands) Vecindario	2–2	1–2
Palencia (Castile and León)	0–2	(Castile and León) Burgos	0–1	0–1

=== Round of 32 ===
Team 1	Agg.	Team 2	1st leg	2nd leg
Coruxo (Galicia (Spain))	3–5	(Galicia (Spain)) Lugo	2–3	1–2
Amorebieta (Basque Country (autonomous community))	(a) 4–4	(Basque Country (autonomous community)) Real Unión	3–0	1–4
Lemona (Basque Country (autonomous community))	5–1	(Castile and León) Burgos	3–1	2–0
Lleida Esportiu (Catalonia)	1–5	(Catalonia) Badalona	0–2	1–3
Ontinyent (Valencian Community)	0–5	(Aragon) Teruel	0–2	0–3
Villarrobledo (Castilla–La Mancha)	2–4	(Valencian Community) Olímpic de Xàtiva	2–1	0–3
Gimnástica Segoviana (Castile and León)	2–4	(Community of Madrid) Alcobendas Sport	1–1	1–3
Rayo Vallecano B (Community of Madrid)	7–0	(Canary Islands) Vecindario	4–0	3–0
Almería B (Andalusia)	1–2	Ceuta	1–0	0–2
Peña Sport (Navarre)	2–3	(Navarre) Tudelano	1–1	1–2
Náxara (La Rioja)	2–3	(La Rioja) SD Logroñés	1–2	1–1
Racing B (Cantabria)	6–4	(Asturias) Tuilla	2–1	4–3
Binissalem (Balearic Islands)	4–1	(Catalonia) Santboià	4–0	0–1
Comarca de Níjar (Andalusia)	4–0	(Region of Murcia) Atl. Pulpileño	2–0	2–0
Toledo (Castilla–La Mancha)	3–1	(Castilla–La Mancha) Puertollano	0–0	3–1
Alcalá (Andalusia)	2–1	(Extremadura) Jerez	2–1	0–0

=== Round of 16 ===
Team 1	Agg.	Team 2	1st leg	2nd leg
Olímpic de Xàtiva (Valencian Community)	0–3	Ceuta	–	–
Lugo (Galicia (Spain))	1–2	(Cantabria) Racing B	1–1	0–1
Rayo Vallecano B (Community of Madrid)	5–0	(Community of Madrid) Alcobendas Sport	2–0	3–0
Lemona (Basque Country (autonomous community))	3–1	(Basque Country (autonomous community)) Amorebieta	1–0	2–1
Tudelano (Navarre)	3–2	(La Rioja) SD Logroñés	2–1	1–1
Badalona (Catalonia)	1–3	(Aragon) Teruel	1–0	0–3
Toledo (Castilla–La Mancha)	1–2	(Balearic Islands) Binissalem	1–0	0–2
Alcalá (Andalusia)	2–1	(Andalusia) Comarca de Níjar	1–0	1–1

=== Quarterfinals ===
Team 1	Agg.	Team 2	1st leg	2nd leg
Alcalá (Andalusia)	3–6	Ceuta	2–3	1–3
Teruel (Aragon)	7–1	(Cantabria) Racing B	4–0	3–1
Rayo Vallecano B (Community of Madrid)	3–4	(Balearic Islands) Binissalem	2–1	1–3
Tudelano (Navarre)	3–3 (a)	(Basque Country (autonomous community)) Lemona	2–2	1–1

=== Semifinals ===
Team 1	Agg.	Team 2	1st leg	2nd leg
Teruel (Aragon)	3–4	(Balearic Islands) Binissalem	2–1	1–3
Ceuta	2–4	(Basque Country (autonomous community)) Lemona	1–1	1–3

=== Final ===
Team 1	Agg.	Team 2	1st leg	2nd leg
Binissalem (Balearic Islands)	6–6 (a)	(Basque Country (autonomous community)) Lemona	5–0	1–6
