= Copa Federación de España (La Rioja tournament) =

The La Rioja tournament is the previous round of the Copa RFEF in La Rioja. Organized by the Football Federation of La Rioja, the Regional teams in Segunda División B and the best teams of the Tercera División (Group 3) not qualified to the Copa del Rey play this tournament, including farm teams.

It is usually played between July and October, and the champion of the tournament qualifies to the National tournament of the Copa RFEF.

== Format ==
The Cup has been played since 2004, when the Riojan group split from Navarre. Played by the teams that did not qualify to Copa del Rey, the format depends on the number of registered teams.

The winner receives a €3,000 prize. The final game is always played at Estadio Mundial 82 in Logroño.

== History ==
Year	Winner	Runner-up	Score
2004	Calahorra	Varea	5–2
2005	Haro	Varea	2–0
2006	Oyonesa	Haro	1–0
2007	Fundación Logroñés	Anguiano	2–0
2008	Haro	Anguiano	4–0
2009	Haro	Anguiano	0–0 (5–4 p)
2010	Haro	Calahorra	League
2011	SD Logroñés	Oyonesa	3–2
2012	Náxara	Varea	3–2
2013	Varea	Náxara	2–0
2014	Haro	SD Logroñés	0–0 (4–2 p)
2015	SD Logroñés	Calahorra	2–2 (6–5 p)
2016	Varea	Haro	1–0
2017	SD Logroñés	Anguiano	2–0
2018	Varea	SD Logroñés	2–1
2019	Náxara	Anguiano	2–1
2020	Arnedo	Náxara	1–0
2021	Alfaro	Casalarreina	2–0
2022	Náxara	Varea	1–0
2023	UD Logroñés	Calahorra	3–0

== Champions ==
Teams	Winners	Runners-up	Winning years
Haro	5	2	2005, 2008, 2009, 2010, 2014
Varea	3	4	2013, 2016, 2018
SD Logroñés	3	2	2011, 2015, 2017
Náxara	3	2	2012, 2019, 2022
Calahorra	1	3	2004
Oyonesa	1	1	2006
Fundación Logroñés	1	0	2007
Arnedo	1	0	2020
Alfaro	1	0	2021
UD Logroñés	1	0	2023
Anguiano	0	5	
Casalarreina	0	1	
