= 2013–14 Copa Federación de España =

Copa RFEF

Tournament details
- Country: Spain
- Teams: 37 (in national phase)

Final positions
- Champions: Ourense
- Runners-up: Guadalajara

Tournament statistics
- Matches played: 62
- Goals scored: 169 (2.73 per match)
- Top goal scorer: Sergi Guardiola (Novelda) 7

The 2013–14 Copa Federación de España was the 21st staging of the Copa Federación de España, also known as Copa RFEF, a knockout competition for Spanish football clubs in Segunda División B and Tercera División. The Copa Federación winner got the trophy and a cash prize of 90,152 euros. It also qualified for the next edition of the tournament. The runner-up received a prize of 30,051 euros and each semifinalist 12,020 euros.

The competition began on 31 July 2013 and ended 10 April 2014. Ourense won 3–2 on aggregate over Guadalajara in the final.

== Autonomous Communities tournaments ==
=== West Andalusia and Ceuta tournament ===
==== First round ====
Team 1	Agg.	Team 2	1st leg	2nd leg
Alcalá	2–0	Coria	2–0	0–0

==== Final ====
Team 1	Agg.	Team 2	1st leg	2nd leg
Alcalá	7–2	Cabecense	6–1	1–1

=== East Andalusia and Melilla tournament ===
==== Semifinals ====
Team 1	Agg.	Team 2	1st leg	2nd leg
Villacarrillo	2–4	Almería B	1–2	1–2
Granada B	6–2	Loja	6–0	0–2

==== Final ====
Team 1	Agg.	Team 2	1st leg	2nd leg
Almería B	4–1	Granada B	2–0	2–1

=== Aragon tournament ===
==== Quarter-finals ====
Team 1	Score	Team 2
Ebro	0–1	Monzón
Teruel	2–0	Ejea
Andorra CF	2–0	Tarazona
Zaragoza B	2–1	Borja

==== Semifinals ====
Team 1	Score	Team 2
Zaragoza B	8–0	Andorra CF
Monzón	1–0	Teruel

==== Final ====
Team 1	Score	Team 2
Zaragoza B	6–1	Monzón

=== Asturias tournament ===
==== Qualifying tournament ====
===== Group A =====
Team	Pld	W	D	L	GF	GA	GD	Pts	SPO	COV	ENT
Sporting Gijón B	4	3	0	1	8	2	+6	9		3–0	2–0
Covadonga	4	2	1	1	7	4	+3	7	2–0		4–0
L'Entregu	4	0	1	3	1	10	−9	1	0–3	1–1	

===== Group B =====
Team	Pld	W	D	L	GF	GA	GD	Pts	AVI	LEA	CUD
Avilés	4	3	0	1	9	4	+5	9		1–3	4–0
Lealtad	4	3	0	1	10	6	+4	9	1–3		4–1
Cudillero	4	0	0	4	2	11	−9	0	0–1	1–2	

===== Group C =====
Team	Pld	W	D	L	GF	GA	GD	Pts	MAR	OVI	LUA
Marino	4	4	0	0	10	1	+9	12		2–0	5–1
R. Oviedo B	4	2	0	2	5	5	0	6	0–1		3–1
Luarca	4	0	0	4	3	12	−9	0	0–2	1–2	

===== Group D =====
Team	Pld	W	D	L	GF	GA	GD	Pts	LAN	CON	UNI
Langreo	4	2	1	1	6	4	+2	7		3–1	2–1
Condal	4	2	0	2	4	4	0	6	1–0		2–0
Universidad	4	1	1	2	3	5	−2	4	1–1	1–0	

==== Semifinals ====
Team 1	Agg.	Team 2	1st leg	2nd leg
Sporting B	1–5	Avilés	0–1	1–4
Marino	3–0	Langreo	3–0	0–0

==== Final ====
Team 1	Score	Team 2
Avilés	0–1	Marino

- At neutral venue

=== Balearic Islands tournament ===
==== First round ====
Team 1	Agg.	Team 2	1st leg	2nd leg
Mallorca B	3–1	Constancia	1–1	2–0
Alcúdia	2–4	Binissalem	0–2	2–2

==== Semifinals ====
Team 1	Agg.	Team 2	1st leg	2nd leg
Formentera	1–6	Mallorca B	1–4	0–2
Poblense	2–3	Binissalem	2–1	0–2

==== Final ====
Team 1	Agg.	Team 2	1st leg	2nd leg
Mallorca B	2–2 (4–5 p)	Binissalem	2–0	0–2

=== Basque Country tournament ===
Team	Pld	W	D	L	GF	GA	GD	Pts
Balmaseda (A)	2	2	0	0	5	2	+3	6
Alavés B	2	0	1	1	3	4	−1	1
Zalla	2	0	1	1	3	5	−2	1

(A) Advance to a further round

Team 1	Score	Team 2
Alavés B	2–2	Zalla
Balmaseda	2–1	Alavés B
Zalla	1–3	Balmaseda

=== Canary Islands tournament ===
==== Final ====
Team 1	Agg.	Team 2	1st leg	2nd leg
Tenerife B	2–1	Unión Viera	0–0	2–1

=== Cantabria tournament ===
==== First round ====
Team 1	Agg.	Team 2	1st leg	2nd leg
Siete Villas	3–4	Gimnástica	2–3	1–1
Cayón	2–3	Santoña	0–0	2–3
Noja	2–3	Laredo	2–2	0–1
Racing Santander B	4–6	Rayo Cantabria	1–1	3–5

==== Semifinals ====
Team 1	Agg.	Team 2	1st leg	2nd leg
Santoña	2–4	Gimnástica	1–2	1–2
Rayo Cantabria	0–2	Laredo	0–0	0–2

==== Final ====
Team 1	Agg.	Team 2	1st leg	2nd leg
Gimnástica	2–2 (a)	Laredo	2–1	0–1

=== Castile and León tournament ===
==== Semifinals ====
Team 1	Agg.	Team 2	1st leg	2nd leg
Zamora	3–4	Arandina	1–2	2–2
Cultural Leonesa	4–2	Guijuelo	2–2	2–0

==== Final ====
Team 1	Agg.	Team 2	1st leg	2nd leg
Cultural Leonesa	0–4	Arandina	0–1	0–3

=== Castile-La Mancha tournament ===
==== First round ====
Team 1	Agg.	Team 2	1st leg	2nd leg
Puertollano	6–2	Gim. Alcázar	4–0	2–2
Zona 5	w.o.	Villarrobledo	w.o.	-

==== Semifinals ====
Team 1	Agg.	Team 2	1st leg	2nd leg
Conquense	2–3	Puertollano	0–1	2–2
Almansa	3–1	Zona 5	2–0	1–1

==== Final ====
Team 1	Agg.	Team 2	1st leg	2nd leg
Puertollano	2–3	Almansa	2–1	0–2

=== Catalonia tournament ===
==== First round ====
Team 1	Agg.	Team 2	1st leg	2nd leg
Prat	4–5	Espanyol B	1–3	3–2

==== Final ====
Team 1	Agg.	Team 2	1st leg	2nd leg
Llagostera	3–5	Espanyol B	2–3	1–2

=== Extremadura tournament ===
==== First round ====
Team 1	Score	Team 2
Jerez	5–1	Díter Zafra
At. San José	1–0	Villanovense

==== Semifinal ====
Team 1	Score	Team 2
Jerez	1–0 (a.e.t.)	Cacereño

==== Final ====
Team 1	Score	Team 2
At. San José	2–1	Jerez

- At neutral venue

=== Galicia tournament ===
==== First round ====
Team 1	Agg.	Team 2	1st leg	2nd leg
Alondras	5–2	Rápido de Bouzas	1–0	4–2
Compostela	5–2	Negreira	0–1	5–1

==== Semifinals ====
Team 1	Agg.	Team 2	1st leg	2nd leg
Compostela	5–4	Pontevedra	2–1	3–3
Alondras	1–3	Ourense	1–1	0–2

==== Final ====
Team 1	Score	Team 2
Compostela	0–1	Ourense

- At neutral venue

=== La Rioja tournament ===
==== First round ====
Team 1	Score	Team 2
Alfaro	0–1	Varea

==== Semifinals ====
Team 1	Score	Team 2
Varea	1–0	Arnedo
Calasancio	1–2	Náxara

==== Final ====
Team 1	Score	Team 2
Varea	2–0	Náxara

=== Madrid tournament ===
Team	Pld	W	D	L	GF	GA	GD	Pts
At. Pinto (A)	4	2	1	1	3	1	+2	7
Alcalá	4	1	3	0	5	4	+1	6
Alcobendas	4	1	2	1	7	5	+2	5
Internacional	4	0	4	0	5	5	0	4
Carabanchel	4	0	2	2	1	6	−5	2

(A) Advance to a further round

Team 1	Score	Team 2
Internacional	1–1	Carabanchel
At. Pinto	1–0	Alcobendas
Alcalá	1–0	At. Pinto
Alcobendas	2–2	Internacional
Internacional	2–2	Alcalá
Carabanchel	0–3	Alcobendas
Alcalá	0–0	Carabanchel
At. Pinto	0–0	Internacional
Carabanchel	0–2	At. Pinto
Alcobendas	2–2	Alcalá

=== Murcia tournament ===
==== First round ====
Team 1	Agg.	Team 2	1st leg	2nd leg
Dep. Minera	2–2 (a)	Cartagena FC	2–2	0–0
El Palmar	5–2	Mar Menor	1–0	4–2
Plus Ultra	2–2 (a)	Molina	1–0	1–2
Fortuna	1–7	Yeclano	0–3	1–4

==== Semifinals ====
Team 1	Agg.	Team 2	1st leg	2nd leg
Cartagena FC	0–3	El Palmar	0–1	0–2
Plus Ultra	1–6	Yeclano	0–4	1–2

==== Final ====
Team 1	Score	Team 2
El Palmar	1–3	Yeclano

- At neutral venue

=== Navarre tournament ===
==== First round ====
===== Group A =====
Team	Pld	W	D	L	GF	GA	GD	Pts
Peña Sport (A)	2	2	0	0	3	1	+2	6
Valle de Egüés	2	0	1	1	2	3	−1	1
Itaroa Huarte	2	0	1	1	1	2	−1	1

(A) Advance to a further round

Team 1	Score	Team 2
Valle de Egüés	1–2	Peña Sport
Itaroa Huarte	1–1	Valle de Egüés
Itaroa Huarte	0–1	Peña Sport

===== Group B =====
Team	Pld	W	D	L	GF	GA	GD	Pts
Iruña (A)	2	1	0	1	5	3	+2	3
Burladés	2	1	0	1	3	2	+1	3
Valtierrano	2	1	0	1	3	6	−3	3

(A) Advance to a further round

Team 1	Score	Team 2
Burladés	2–0	Iruña
Valtierrano	2–1	Burladés
Iruña	5–1	Valtierrano

==== Final ====
Team 1	Score	Team 2
Peña Sport	1–0	Iruña

- At neutral venue

=== Valencian Community tournament ===
==== First round ====
Team 1	Agg.	Team 2	1st leg	2nd leg
Castellón	2–1	Torre Levante	1–0	1–1
Cullera	4–4 (a)	At. Saguntino	2–3	2–1

==== Semifinals ====
Team 1	Agg.	Team 2	1st leg	2nd leg
Alzira	4–1	Ontinyent	4–1	0–0
Castellón	1–0	At. Saguntino	0–0	1–0

==== Final ====
Team 1	Agg.	Team 2	1st leg	2nd leg
Castellón	2–3	Alzira	1–1	1–2

== National phase ==
Qualified teams

Current champion

- (Catalonia) Sant Andreu (Renounced to play)

Teams losing Copa del Rey first round

- (Asturias) R. Oviedo (Renounced to play)
- (Cantabria) Tropezón
- (Galicia (Spain)) Racing Ferrol
- (Community of Madrid) Puerta Bonita
- (Canary Islands) At. Granadilla
- (Basque Country (autonomous community)) Amorebieta
- (Basque Country (autonomous community)) R. Unión
- (Castilla–La Mancha) Toledo
- (Valencian Community) Huracán Valencia (Renounced to play)
- (Valencian Community) Alcoyano
- (Balearic Islands) Peña Deportiva
- Extremadura
- (Region of Murcia) La Hoya Lorca
- (Andalusia) El Palo
- (Andalusia) Linense (Renounced to play)
- (Castilla–La Mancha) Guadalajara
- (Navarre) San Juan
- (Valencian Community) Novelda

Winners of Autonomous Communities tournaments

- (Aragon) Zaragoza B
- (La Rioja) Varea
- (Navarre) Peña Sport
- (Canary Islands) Tenerife B
- (Community of Madrid) At. Pinto
- (Balearic Islands) Binissalem
- (Galicia (Spain)) Ourense
- (Andalusia) Almería B
- (Asturias) Marino
- (Catalonia) Espanyol B
- (Basque Country (autonomous community)) Balmaseda
- (Cantabria) Laredo
- (Extremadura) At. San José
- (Castilla–La Mancha) Almansa
- (Andalusia) Alcalá
- (Region of Murcia) Yeclano
- (Castile and León) Arandina
- (Valencian Community) Alzira

=== Bracket ===
Round of 32
(Catalonia) Espanyol B	3	0	3
(Balearic Islands) Peña Deportiva	2	0	0
(Aragon) Zaragoza B	3	0	3
(Balearic Islands) Binissalem	0	0	0
(Castilla–La Mancha) Almansa	0	1	1
(Community of Madrid) Atlético Pinto	4	3	7
(Castilla–La Mancha) Guadalajara	4	3	7
(Canary Islands) Tenerife B	3	2	5
(Canary Islands) At. Granadilla	–	–	–
(Castilla–La Mancha) Toledo	–	–	–
(Valencian Community) UD Alzira	0	1	1
(Region of Murcia) Yeclano	0	2	2
(Valencian Community) Novelda	0	1	1
(Andalusia) Almería B	0	0	0
(Region of Murcia) La Hoya Lorca	1	1	2
(Valencian Community) Alcoyano	0	5	5
(Andalusia) Alcalá	1	0	1
(Extremadura) At. San José	0	0	0
Extremadura	1	0	1
(Andalusia) El Palo	0	3	3
(Cantabria) Laredo	0	0	0
(Galicia (Spain)) Ourense	1	4	5
(Galicia (Spain)) Racing Ferrol	1	0	1
(Asturias) Marino	1	2	3
(Navarre) San Juan	1	1	2
(Basque Country (autonomous community)) Balmaseda	1	3	4
(Cantabria) Tropezón	5	1	6
(Castile and León) Arandina	1	3	4
(La Rioja) Varea	0	1	1
(Basque Country (autonomous community)) Amorebieta	1	4	5
(Basque Country (autonomous community)) Real Unión	2	1	3
(Navarre) Peña Sport	1	0	1

Round of 16
(Catalonia) Espanyol B	2	1	3
(Aragon) Zaragoza B	1	4	5
(Community of Madrid) Atlético Pinto	1	0	1
(Castilla–La Mancha) Guadalajara	0	3	3
(Castilla–La Mancha) Toledo	2	1	3
(Region of Murcia) Yeclano	2	1	3
(Valencian Community) Novelda	2	1	3
(Valencian Community) Alcoyano	1	1	2
(Andalusia) Alcalá	0	1	1
(Andalusia) El Palo	0	1	1
(Galicia (Spain)) Ourense	1	3	4
(Asturias) Marino	0	0	0
(Basque Country (autonomous community)) Balmaseda	2	2	4
(Cantabria) Tropezón	0	0	0
(Basque Country (autonomous community)) Amorebieta	1	0	1
(Basque Country (autonomous community)) Real Unión	2	4	6

Quarterfinals
(Aragon) Zaragoza B	1	2	3
(Castilla–La Mancha) Guadalajara	2	2	4
(Region of Murcia) Yeclano	1	0	1
(Valencian Community) Novelda	2	2	4
(Andalusia) Alcalá	3	1	4
(Galicia (Spain)) Ourense	1	6	7
(Basque Country (autonomous community)) Balmaseda	2	4	6
(Basque Country (autonomous community)) Real Unión	2	3	5

Semifinals
(Castilla–La Mancha) Guadalajara	0	2	2
(Valencian Community) Novelda	1	0	1
(Galicia (Spain)) Ourense	3	0	3
(Basque Country (autonomous community)) Balmaseda	0	2	2

Final
(Castilla–La Mancha) Guadalajara	2	0	2
(Galicia (Spain)) Ourense	1	2	3

=== Preliminary round ===
Preliminary round was played between 6 and 13 November 2013.

Team 1	Agg.	Team 2	1st leg	2nd leg
At. Pinto (Community of Madrid)	2–1	(Community of Madrid) Puerta Bonita	1–0	1–1

==== First leg ====
6 November 2013
20:30

At. Pinto	1–0	Puerta Bonita
Privat Yao Kouakou 86'

Estadio Amelia del Castillo, Pinto, Madrid
Attendance: 250

==== Second leg ====
13 November 2013
20:00

Puerta Bonita	1–1	At. Pinto
Kevin Vila 50'		Edgar Agudo 23'

Antiguo Canódromo, Carabanchel, Madrid

At. Pinto won 2–1 on aggregate

=== Round of 32 ===
The draw for the Preliminary round and the Round of 32 was held on October 28 at the headquarters of the RFEF. Round of 32 was played between 20 November and 19 December 2013.

Team 1	Agg.	Team 2	1st leg	2nd leg
Laredo (Cantabria)	0–5	(Galicia (Spain)) Ourense	0–1	0–4
Racing Ferrol (Galicia (Spain))	1–3	(Asturias) Marino	1–1	0–2
Tropezón (Cantabria)	6–4	(Castile and León) Arandina	5–1	1–3
Guadalajara (Castilla–La Mancha)	7–5	(Canary Islands) Tenerife B	4–3	3–2
At. Granadilla (Canary Islands)	w.o.	(Castilla–La Mancha) Toledo	–	–
Almansa (Castilla–La Mancha)	1–7	(Community of Madrid) At. Pinto	0–4	1–3
R. Unión (Basque Country (autonomous community))	3–1	(Navarre) Peña Sport	2–1	1–0
San Juan (Navarre)	2–4	(Basque Country (autonomous community)) Balmaseda	1–1	1–3
Varea (La Rioja)	1–5	(Basque Country (autonomous community)) Amorebieta	0–1	1–4
Novelda (Valencian Community)	1–0	(Andalusia) Almería B	0–0	1–0
La Hoya Lorca (Region of Murcia)	2–5	(Valencian Community) Alcoyano	1–0	1–5
Alzira (Valencian Community)	1–2	(Region of Murcia) Yeclano	0–0	1–2
Extremadura	1–3	(Andalusia) El Palo	1–0	0–3
Alcalá (Andalusia)	1–0	(Extremadura) At. San José	1–0	0–0
Zaragoza B (Aragon)	3–0	(Balearic Islands) Binissalem	3–0	0–0
Espanyol B (Catalonia)	3–2	(Balearic Islands) Peña Deportiva	3–2	0–0

==== First leg ====
27 November 2013
20:00

Laredo	0–1	Ourense
		Borja Valle 77'

Campo de Fútbol San Lorenzo, Laredo, Cantabria
27 November 2013
18:30

Racing Ferrol	1–1	Marino
Manu Barreiro 90+2'		David Álvarez 15'

A Malata, Ferrol, A Coruña, Galicia
27 November 2013
20:00

Tropezón	5–1	Arandina
Alberto Dorronsoro 16'; Luis González 63'; Álex González 85'; Sergio Conde 88'; Héctor Marcos 90'		Dani Martínez 41'

Campo nº 2 Santa Ana, Tanos, Torrelavega, Cantabria
Attendance: 150
27 November 2013
20:00

Guadalajara	4–3	Tenerife B
Philippe Toledo 13'; Joan Grasa 58'; Jairo Álvarez 76'; Diego Álvarez 'Prosi' 90+5'		David Amorín 43'; Jairo González 57'; Jefté Betancor 86'

Pedro Escartín, Guadalajara, Castile-La Mancha
28 November 2013
20:30

Almansa	0–4	At. Pinto
		Sodiq Alade 32'; Edgar Agudo 58'; José Luis 72'; Agus 86'

Estadio Municipal Paco Simón, Almansa, Albacete, Castile-La Mancha
27 November 2013
20:00

R. Unión	2–1	Peña Sport
Iñaki Goikoetxea 29' 89'		Xabi Calvo 33'

Gal, Irun, Gipuzkoa, Basque Country
Attendance: 100
28 November 2013
20:00

San Juan	1–1	Balmaseda
Javi Jiménez 47'		Raúl Intxausti 34'

Estadio San Juan, Pamplona, Navarre
Attendance: 300
4 December 2013
20:15

Varea	0–1	Amorebieta
		Txema Pan 59'

Estadio Mundial 82, Logroño, La Rioja
28 November 2013
20:45

Novelda	0–0	Almería B

Estadio La Magdalena, Novelda, Alicante, Valencian Community
28 November 2013
20:45

La Hoya Lorca	1–0	Alcoyano
Alfredo Ortuño (penalty missed) 40'; Carlos Martínez 81'

Francisco Artés Carrasco, Lorca, Murcia
27 November 2013
20:30

Alzira	0–0	Yeclano

Estadio Luis Suñer, Alzira, Valencia, Valencian Community
20 November 2013
20:30

Extremadura	1–0	El Palo
Curro González 23' (pen.)

Francisco de la Hera, Almendralejo, Badajoz, Extremadura
Attendance: 250
28 November 2013
21:00

Alcalá	1–0	At. San José
Gonzalo Trigueros 52'

Estadio Francisco Bono, Alcalá de Guadaira, Sevilla, Andalusia
Attendance: 200
27 November 2013
11:30

Zaragoza B	3–0	Binissalem
Pablo Moreno 16'; Juan Esnáider 38' 43'

Ciudad Deportiva Real Zaragoza, Zaragoza, Aragon
27 November 2013
19:00

Espanyol B	3–2	Peña Deportiva
Kilian Grant 17'; Pere Martínez 43'; Jairo Morillas 50' (pen.)		Manuel Salinas 39'; Samuel Tomillero 90+1'

Ciutat Esportiva de Sant Adrià, Barcelona, Catalonia

==== Second leg ====
18 December 2013
20:00

Ourense	4–0	Laredo
Capi 23' 70'; Gustavo Souto 55'; Iker Alegre 87'

O Couto, Ourense, Galicia
Attendance: 500

Ourense won 5–0 on aggregate

18 December 2013
20:00

Marino	2–0	Racing Ferrol
Alejandro 33'; Dani Pevida 45'

Miramar, Luanco, Asturias
Attendance: 300

Marino won 3–1 on aggregate

18 December 2013
20:15

Arandina	3–1	Tropezón
Gustavo 34' (penalty missed) 68'; Belforti 45'; Durantez 75' (pen.)		Álex Perujo 54'

El Montecillo, Aranda de Duero, Burgos, Castile and León

Tropezón won 6–4 on aggregate

5 December 2013
20:00

Tenerife B	2–3	Guadalajara
Natanael Barreto 43'; Jorge Sáenz 83'		Javi Pérez 47'; Quique González 75' 90+4'

Centro Insular, Tenerife, Canary Islands
Attendance: 200

Guadalajara won 7–5 on aggregate

18 December 2013
20:30

At. Pinto	3–1	Almansa
Adrián Popler 45' 50'; Edgar Agudo 75'		José Carlos 85'

Estadio Amelia del Castillo, Pinto, Madrid
Attendance: 300

At. Pinto won 7–1 on aggregate

18 December 2013
19:00

Peña Sport	0–1	R. Unión
		Iñaki Goikoetxea (penalty missed) 72'; Rodrigo Alonso 72'

San Francisco, Tafalla, Navarre

Real Unión won 3–1 on aggregate

18 December 2013
20:00

Balmaseda	3–1	San Juan
Lanza 5'; Santi Vélez 40'; Mario 90' (pen.)		Xabier 9'

La Baluga, Balmaseda, Biscay, Basque Country

Balmaseda won 4–2 on aggregate

18 December 2013
19:30

Amorebieta	4–1	Varea
Mikel Zarrabeitia 32'; Jon Apráiz 52'; Arman Imaz 63'; Txema Pan 65'		Nacho 90'

Urritxe, Amorebieta, Biscay, Basque Country

Amorebieta won 5–1 on aggregate

11 December 2013
20:30

Almería B	0–1	Novelda
		Félix Rial 87' (pen.)

Anexo Estadio Juegos Mediterráneos, Almería, Andalusia
Attendance: 150

Novelda won 1–0 on aggregate

18 December 2013
20:30

Alcoyano	5–1	La Hoya Lorca
Clausi 11'; César Remón 46'; Javi Rubio 67'; Rayco 80' 82'		Pallarés 21'

El Collao, Alcoy, Alicante Valencian Community
Attendance: 1.328

Alcoyano won 5–2 on aggregate

18 December 2013
20:30

Yeclano	2–1	Alzira
Alejandro Villalba 'Crivi' 13'; Eugenio Pérez 74'		José Luis Valiente 60'

La Constitución, Yecla, Murcia

Yeclano won 2–1 on aggregate

18 December 2013
19:30

El Palo	3–0	Extremadura
Rafael Villén 'Rafita' 5'; Juan José Galdeano 'Juanillo' 48' (pen.) 90+3' (pen.)

Nuevo San Ignacio, Málaga, Andalusia
Attendance: 1500

El Palo won 3–1 on aggregate

19 December 2013
21:00

At. San José	0–0	Alcalá

Francisco de la Hera, Almendralejo, Badajoz, Extremadura

Alcalá won 1–0 on aggregate

18 December 2013
19:30

Binissalem	0–0	Zaragoza B

Miquel Pons, Binissalem, Majorca, Balearic Islands

Zaragoza B won 3–0 on aggregate

18 December 2013
20:00

Peña Deportiva	0–0	Espanyol B

Municipal, Santa Eulària, Ibiza, Balearic Islands
Attendance: 150

Espanyol B won 3–2 on aggregate

=== Round of 16 ===
The draw for the Round of 16 was held on 23 December 2013 at the headquarters of the RFEF. Round of 16 was played between 8 and 23 January 2014.

Team 1	Agg.	Team 2	1st leg	2nd leg
Ourense (Galicia (Spain))	4–0	(Asturias) Marino	1–0	3–0
Balmaseda (Basque Country (autonomous community))	4–0	(Cantabria) Tropezón	2–0	2–0
Alcalá (Andalusia)	1–1 (a)	(Andalusia) El Palo	0–0	1–1
Novelda (Valencian Community)	3–2	(Valencian Community) Alcoyano	2–1	1–1
Toledo (Castilla–La Mancha)	3–3 (a)	(Region of Murcia) Yeclano	2–2	1–1
At. Pinto (Community of Madrid)	1–3 (a.e.t.)	(Castilla–La Mancha) Guadalajara	1–0	0–3
Espanyol B (Catalonia)	3–5	(Aragon) Zaragoza B	2–1	1–4
Amorebieta (Basque Country (autonomous community))	1–6	(Basque Country (autonomous community)) R. Unión	1–2	0–4

==== First leg ====
8 January 2014
20:15

Ourense	1–0	Marino
Daniel Portela 39'

O Couto, Ourense, Galicia
Attendance: 200
8 January 2014
20:00

Balmaseda	2–0	Tropezón
Mario Sánchez 12'; Luis Lanza 25'

La Baluga, Balmaseda, Biscay, Basque Country
9 January 2014
21:00

Alcalá	0–0	El Palo

Estadio Francisco Bono, Alcalá de Guadaira, Sevilla, Andalusia
8 January 2014
19:30

Novelda	2–1	Alcoyano
Sergi Guardiola 47' 74'		Nacho Rodríguez 90+2'

Estadio La Magdalena, Novelda, Alicante, Valencian Community
8 January 2014
20:30

Toledo	2–2	Yeclano
José Javier Mínguez 10' (pen.); Sergio San José 35'		Luis Domenech (penalty missed) 5'; Mariano Agustín 24'; Raúl González 87'

Salto del Caballo, Toledo, Castile-La Mancha
8 January 2014
20:15

At. Pinto	1–0	Guadalajara
Privat 62'

Estadio Amelia del Castillo, Pinto, Madrid
Attendance: 400
8 January 2014
19:00

Espanyol B	2–1	Zaragoza B
Aday Benítez 56'; Xavi Puerto 90+2'		Diego Suárez 42' (pen.)

Ciutat Esportiva de Sant Adrià, Barcelona, Catalonia
8 January 2014
19:30

Amorebieta	1–2	R. Unión
Teo Tirado 29'		Gaizka Saizar 49' 54' (pen.)

Urritxe, Amorebieta, Biscay, Basque Country

==== Second leg ====
22 January 2014
20:00

Marino	0–3	Ourense
		Óscar Martínez 23'; Rubén Arce 43'; Borja Valle 66'

Miramar, Luanco, Asturias
Attendance: 250

Ourense won 4–0 on aggregate

22 January 2014
20:00

Tropezón	0–2	Balmaseda
Dorronsoro (penalty missed) 38'		Txemi Páez 87'; Joseba Macías 'Poto' 90+2'

Campo nº 2 Santa Ana, Tanos, Torrelavega, Cantabria

Balmaseda won 4–0 on aggregate

22 January 2014
20:00

El Palo	1–1	Alcalá
Julián Cardellino 20'		José Luis Mediano 'Pana' 19'

Nuevo San Ignacio, Málaga, Andalusia
Attendance: 150

Alcalá won 1–1 on away goals rule

23 January 2014
20:30

Alcoyano	1–1	Novelda
César Remón 78' (penalty missed) 80'		Sergi Guardiola 74'

El Collao, Alcoy, Alicante Valencian Community

Novelda won 3–2 on aggregate

22 January 2014
20:15

Yeclano	1–1	Toledo
Alejandro Villalba 'Crivi' 66'		Javi Bernal 48' (o.g.)

La Constitución, Yecla, Murcia

Yeclano won 3–3 on away goals rule

22 January 2014
20:00

Guadalajara	3–0	At. Pinto
Javi López (penalty missed) 51'; Quique González (penalty missed) 76'; Quique González 90+2'; Rubén Arroyo 102' (pen.); Javi Pérez 116'

Pedro Escartín, Guadalajara, Castile-La Mancha
Attendance: 200

Guadalajara won 3–1 on aggregate after extra time

22 January 2014
16:00

Zaragoza B	4–1	Espanyol B
Diego Suárez 17'; Anton Shvets 18' 45'; Daniel Santigosa 71'		Xavi Puerto 53'

Ciudad Deportiva Real Zaragoza, Zaragoza, Aragon

Zaragoza B won 5–3 on aggregate

22 January 2014
19:30

R. Unión	4–0	Amorebieta
Hugo Rodríguez 10'; Pablo Balerdi 48'; Gaizka Saizar 62'; Yeray González 77'

Gal, Irun, Gipuzkoa, Basque Country

R. Unión won 6–1 on aggregate

=== Quarter-finals ===
The draw for the Quarter-finals was held on 24 January 2014 at the headquarters of the RFEF. Quarter-finals were played between 5 and 19 February 2014.

Team 1	Agg.	Team 2	1st leg	2nd leg
Balmaseda (Basque Country (autonomous community))	6–5	(Basque Country (autonomous community)) R. Unión	2–2	4–3
Zaragoza B (Aragon)	3–4 (a.e.t.)	(Castilla–La Mancha) Guadalajara	1–2	2–2
Yeclano (Region of Murcia)	1–4	(Valencian Community) Novelda	1–2	0–2
Alcalá (Andalusia)	4–7	(Galicia (Spain)) Ourense	3–1	1–6

==== First leg ====
5 February 2014
20:00

Balmaseda	2–2	R. Unión
Joseba Macías 'Poto' (penalty missed) 66'; Iker Zárate 76'; Santi Vélez 90+1'		Mikel Azkoiti 3'; Gaizka Saizar 36'

La Baluga, Balmaseda, Biscay, Basque Country
12 February 2014
17:00

Zaragoza B	1–2	Guadalajara
Juan Esnáider 82'		Espín 28'; Javi Pérez 83'

Ciudad Deportiva Real Zaragoza, Zaragoza, Aragon
6 February 2014
20:30

Yeclano	1–2	Novelda
Luis Doménech 45' (pen.)		Sergi Guardiola 24' 90+1' (pen.)

La Constitución, Yecla, Murcia
5 February 2014
20:00

Alcalá	3–1	Ourense
Gonzalo Trigueros 8' (pen.); José Luis Mediano 'Pana' 18'; Francisco Javier Hidalgo 'Son' 61'		Borja Yebra 73'

Estadio Francisco Bono, Alcalá de Guadaira, Sevilla, Andalusia
Attendance: 1.000

==== Second leg ====
12 February 2014
19:00

R. Unión	3–4	Balmaseda
Mikel Abaroa 39'; Gaizka Saizar 56'; Iñigo Urbieta 83'		Francisco Javier Prada 'Vicky' 7'; Joseba Macías 'Poto' 9'; Roberto Cuevas 73' 75'

Gal, Irun, Gipuzkoa, Basque Country

Balmaseda won 6–5 on aggregate

19 February 2014
18:00

Guadalajara	2–2	Zaragoza B
Quique González 12' 119' (pen.)		Juan Esnáider 43'; Adán 85'

Pedro Escartín, Guadalajara, Castile-La Mancha

Guadalajara won 4–3 on aggregate after extra time

12 February 2014
20:00

Novelda	2–0	Yeclano
Sergi Guardiola 85' 87'

Estadio La Magdalena, Novelda, Alicante, Valencian Community

Novelda won 4–1 on aggregate

12 February 2014
20:00

Ourense	6–1	Alcalá
Javi Hernández 15'; Oscar Martínez 45' 52' 55'; Iker Alegre 70'; José Docsión (o.g.) 81'		Francisco Javier Hidalgo 'Son' 75'

O Couto, Ourense, Galicia

Ourense won 7–4 on aggregate

=== Semi-finals ===
The draw for the Semi-finals was held on 13 February 2014 at the headquarters of the RFEF. Semi-finals were played between 27 February and 5 March 2014.

Team 1	Agg.	Team 2	1st leg	2nd leg
Novelda (Valencian Community)	1–2 (a.e.t.)	(Castilla–La Mancha) Guadalajara	1–0	0–2
Ourense (Galicia (Spain))	3–2	(Basque Country (autonomous community)) Balmaseda	3–0	0–2

==== First leg ====
27 February 2014
20:30

Novelda	1–0	Guadalajara
Manu 52'

Estadio La Magdalena, Novelda, Alicante, Valencian Community
27 February 2014
20:00

Ourense	3–0	Balmaseda
Borja Valle 3'; Javi Hernández 13'; Óscar Martínez 59'

O Couto, Ourense, Galicia

==== Second leg ====
5 March 2014
19:30

Guadalajara	2–0	Novelda
Diego Álvarez 'Prosi' 69'; Javi Pérez 109'

Pedro Escartín, Guadalajara, Castile-La Mancha

Guadalajara won 2–1 on aggregate after extra time

5 March 2014
20:00

Balmaseda	2–0	Ourense
Santi Vélez 44' 86'; Iker Zárate (penalty missed) 77'

La Baluga, Balmaseda, Biscay, Basque Country

Ourense won 3–2 on aggregate

=== Final ===
Final was played between 3 and 10 April 2014.

Team 1	Agg.	Team 2	1st leg	2nd leg
Guadalajara (Castilla–La Mancha)	2–3	(Galicia (Spain)) Ourense	2–1	0–2

==== First leg ====
3 April 2014
20:00

Guadalajara	2–1	Ourense
Javi López 45+1'; Javi Pérez 90'		Capi 31'

Pedro Escartín, Guadalajara, Castile-La Mancha
Attendance: 4,000

==== Second leg ====
10 April 2014
20:00

Ourense	2–0	Guadalajara
Javi Hernández 33' 59'

O Couto, Ourense, Galicia

Ourense won 3–2 on aggregate
