= Logroñés =

Logroñés may refer to five clubs based in Logroño, Spain:

- CD Logroñés, Spanish football club founded in 1940 and not entering any competition since 2009
- AD Fundación Logroñés, Spanish football club founded in 1999 and dissolved in 2009
- Logroñés CF, Spanish football club founded in 2000 and dissolved in 2008
- UD Logroñés, Spanish football club founded in 2009
- SD Logroñés, Spanish football club founded in 2009
