= Copa Federación de España =

Copa Federación
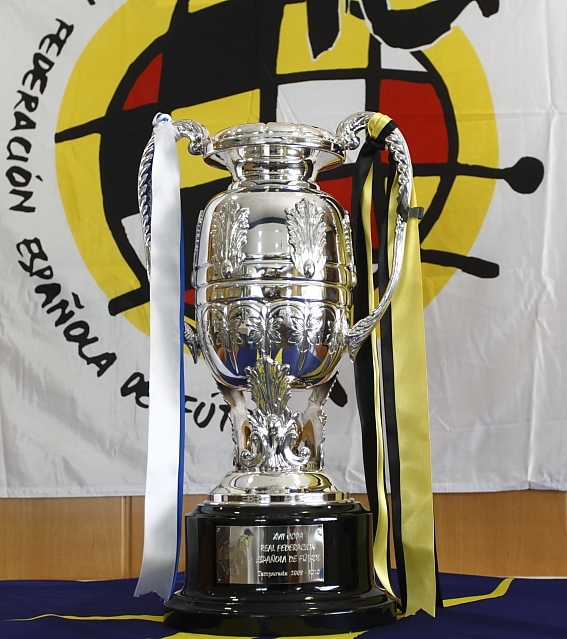
- The Copa Real Federación Española de Fútbol trophy
- Organiser(s): RFEF
- Founded: 1944 (old competition); 1993 (current competition)
- Region: Spain
- Teams: 32
- Current champions: Ourense CF (1st title)
- Most championships: Puertollano (3 titles)
- Website: rfef.es/copa-rfef
- 2026 Copa Federación

The Copa Real Federación Española de Fútbol, popularly known as the Copa Federación (Federation Cup) or Copa RFEF, is a Spanish football competition organised by the Royal Spanish Football Federation (RFEF). It has been held since the 1993−94 season as a tournament for smaller football clubs, with a format similar to that of the Copa del Rey.

It is contested annually by clubs from Primera Federación, Segunda Federación and Tercera Federación that have not qualified for the Copa del Rey.

The competition is currently played in two phases. The first phase is organized at the regional level, following the regulations established by each autonomous federation. The second phase is national in scope and features 32 teams: the 20 best teams from the regional phase —one from each autonomous community, except Andalusia, which contributes two teams, plus one team each from Ceuta and Melilla—; five teams from Segunda Federación —the best team from each group in the previous season that did not qualify for the Copa del Rey—; and seven teams from the Tercera Federación —the second-placed teams from the previous season, regardless of group, with the best coefficients and without a Copa del Rey berth.

In the national phase, the 32 teams are divided into four groups of eight based on geographic proximity. Each group plays three single-elimination knockout rounds, with pairings determined by draw. The winner of each group advances to the final phase as a semi-finalist, and all four semi-finalists earn qualification for the Copa del Rey.

The current Copa Federación, created in 1994, is not considered by the RFEF the same as the original one. A similar competition with regional qualification tournaments for amateur clubs (including the affiliated teams of the professional clubs, such as Real Madrid C and FC Barcelona C), the Campeonato de España de Aficionados, operated from 1930 until 1987, but is also considered to be distinct from the Copa Federación.

== Finals ==
=== Old tournament ===
| Season | Location | Winner | Runner-up | Score | Note |
|---|---|---|---|---|---|
| 1944–45 | Barcelona | San Martín | Valladolid | 1–0 | |
| 1945–46 | Madrid | Alavés | Sueca | 3–2 | |
| 1946–50 | Not played | | | | |
| 1950–51 | Zaragoza | RCD Córdoba | Barakaldo | 3–2 | |
| 1951–52 | Madrid | Jaén | Orensana | 3–1 | |
| 1952–53 | Madrid | Valladolid | Cacereño | 1–0 | |
| 1953–54 | Zaragoza | Betis | Valladolid | 3–2 | Not official |

=== Modern tournament ===
| Season | Winner | Runner-up | 1st Leg | 2nd Leg | Agg. |
|---|---|---|---|---|---|
| 1993–94 | Puertollano Industrial | Platges de Calvià | 1–4 | 5–0 | 6–4 |
| 1994–95 | Las Palmas B | Balaguer | 1–0 | 3–1 | 4–1 |
| 1995–96 | Mallorca B | Murcia | 0–1 | 3–1 | 3–2 (a.e.t.) |
| 1996–97 | Burgos | Gáldar | 1–1 | 4–1 | 5–1 |
| 1997–98 | Binéfar | Alcalá | 1–2 | 2–0 | 3–2 |
| 1998–99 | Racing B | Lugo | 3–0 | 0–0 | 3–0 |
| 1999–2000 | Sabadell | Elche | 2–0 | 1–3 | 3–3 (a) |
| 2000–01 | Marino | Tropezón | 1–0 | 3–0 | 4–0 |
| 2001–02 | Celta B | Gavà | 1–0 | 2–1 | 3–1 |
| 2002–03 | Avilés | Tomelloso | 3–0 | 1–0 | 4–0 |
| 2003–04 | Badalona | Villanueva | 0–0 | 4–1 | 4–1 |
| 2004–05 | Mataró | Benidorm | 1–2 | 1–0 | 2–2 (a) |
| 2005–06 | Puertollano | Huesca | 1–1 | 2–0 | 3–1 |
| 2006–07 | Pontevedra | Mallorca B | 4–1 | 0–1 | 4–2 |
| 2007–08 | Ourense | Reus | 2–1 | 1–1 | 3–2 |
| 2008–09 | Jaén | Rayo Vallecano B | 0–0 | 4–1 | 4–1 |
| 2009–10 | San Roque Lepe | Lorca Deportiva | 1–0 | 2–0 | 3–0 |
| 2010–11 | Puertollano | Lemona | 0–2 | 4–1 | 4–3 |
| 2011–12 | Binissalem | Lemona | 5–0 | 1–6 | 6–6 (a) |
| 2012–13 | Sant Andreu | La Hoya Lorca | 3–0 | 1–0 | 4–0 |
| 2013–14 | Ourense | Guadalajara | 1–2 | 2–0 | 3–2 |
| 2014–15 | Real Unión | Castellón | 1–0 | 3–0 | 4–0 |
| 2015–16 | Atlético Baleares | Rayo Majadahonda | 2–2 | 1–0 | 3–2 |
| 2016–17 | Atlético Saguntino | Fuenlabrada | 0–0 | 3–0 | 3–0 |
| 2017–18 | Pontevedra | Ontinyent | 1–0 | 0–0 | 1–0 |
| 2018–19 | Mirandés | Cornellà | 3–0 | 2–2 | 5–2 |

=== New format ===
| Season | Host | Winner | Runner-up | Score |
|---|---|---|---|---|
| 2019 | Enrique Roca, Murcia | Murcia | Tudelano | 1–1 (4–2 p) |
| 2020 | Dehesa de Navalcarbón, Las Rozas de Madrid | Llagostera | Las Rozas | 2–1 (a.e.t.) |
| 2021 | Nuevo Arcángel, Córdoba | Córdoba | Guijuelo | 1–0 |
| 2022 | Luis Suñer Picó, Alzira | Arenteiro | Alzira | 2–0 (a.e.t.) |
| 2023 | El Prado, Talavera de la Reina | Badalona Futur | Talavera de la Reina | 2–1 |
| 2024 | Francisco de la Hera, Almendralejo | Extremadura | Compostela | 2–1 |
| 2025 | O Couto, Ourense | Ourense CF | Orihuela | 3–0 |
| 2026 | Las Llanas, Sestao | Sestao River | Recreativo | 1–0 |

== Performances ==
=== Performance by club ===
==== New tournament ====
| Team | Winners | Runners-up | Winning years | Runner-up years |
|---|---|---|---|---|
| Puertollano | 3 | — | 1994, 2006, 2011 | — |
| CD Ourense | 2 | — | 2008, 2014 | — |
| Pontevedra | 2 | — | 2007, 2018 | — |
| Llagostera/Badalona Futur | 2 | — | 2020, 2023 | — |
| Mallorca B | 1 | 1 | 1996 | 2007 |
| Murcia | 1 | 1 | 2019 | 1996 |
| Las Palmas B | 1 | — | 1995 | — |
| Burgos | 1 | — | 1997 | — |
| Binéfar | 1 | — | 1998 | — |
| Racing B | 1 | — | 1999 | — |
| Sabadell | 1 | — | 2000 | — |
| Marino | 1 | — | 2001 | — |
| Celta B | 1 | — | 2002 | — |
| Avilés | 1 | — | 2003 | — |
| Badalona | 1 | — | 2004 | — |
| Mataró | 1 | — | 2005 | — |
| Jaén | 1 | — | 2009 | — |
| San Roque Lepe | 1 | — | 2010 | — |
| Binissalem | 1 | — | 2012 | — |
| Sant Andreu | 1 | — | 2013 | — |
| Real Unión | 1 | — | 2015 | — |
| Atlético Baleares | 1 | — | 2016 | — |
| Atlético Saguntino | 1 | — | 2017 | — |
| Mirandés | 1 | — | 2019 | — |
| Córdoba | 1 | — | 2021 | — |
| Arenteiro | 1 | — | 2022 | — |
| Extremadura | 1 | — | 2024 | — |
| Ourense CF | 1 | — | 2025 | — |
| Sestao River | 1 | — | 2026 | — |
| Lemona | — | 2 | — | 2011, 2012 |
| Platges Calvià | — | 1 | — | 1994 |
| Balaguer | — | 1 | — | 1995 |
| Gáldar | — | 1 | — | 1997 |
| Alcalá | — | 1 | — | 1998 |
| Lugo | — | 1 | — | 1999 |
| Elche | — | 1 | — | 2000 |
| Tropezón | — | 1 | — | 2001 |
| Gavà | — | 1 | — | 2002 |
| Tomelloso | — | 1 | — | 2003 |
| Villanueva | — | 1 | — | 2004 |
| Benidorm | — | 1 | — | 2005 |
| Huesca | — | 1 | — | 2006 |
| Reus | — | 1 | — | 2008 |
| Rayo B | — | 1 | — | 2009 |
| Lorca Deportiva | — | 1 | — | 2010 |
| La Hoya Lorca | — | 1 | — | 2013 |
| Guadalajara | — | 1 | — | 2014 |
| Castellón | — | 1 | — | 2015 |
| Rayo Majadahonda | — | 1 | — | 2016 |
| Fuenlabrada | — | 1 | — | 2017 |
| Ontinyent | — | 1 | — | 2018 |
| Cornellà | — | 1 | — | 2019 |
| Tudelano | — | 1 | — | 2019 |
| Las Rozas | — | 1 | — | 2020 |
| Guijuelo | — | 1 | — | 2021 |
| Alzira | — | 1 | — | 2022 |
| Talavera de la Reina | — | 1 | — | 2023 |
| Compostela | — | 1 | — | 2024 |
| Orihuela | — | 1 | — | 2025 |
| Recreativo | — | 1 | — | 2026 |

=== Performance by autonomous community ===
| # | Autonomous community | Winners | Clubs |
|---|---|---|---|
| 1= | Catalonia | 7 | Sant Andreu, Mataró, Badalona, Sabadell, San Martín, Llagostera, Badalona Futur |
| 1= | Galicia | 7 | CD Ourense (2), Pontevedra (2), Celta B, Arenteiro, Ourense CF |
| 3 | Andalusia | 5 | Jaén (2), Córdoba CF, RCD Córdoba, San Roque Lepe |
| 4= | Castile and León | 3 | Burgos, Valladolid, Mirandés |
| 4= | Castile-La Mancha | 3 | Puertollano (3) |
| 4= | Balearic Islands | 3 | Mallorca B, Binissalem, Atlético Baleares |
| 7= | Asturias | 2 | Avilés, Marino |
| 7= | Basque Country | 2 | Alavés, Real Unión |
| 9= | Cantabria | 1 | Racing B |
| 9= | Aragon | 1 | Binéfar |
| 9= | Canary Islands | 1 | Las Palmas B |
| 9= | Valencian Community | 1 | Atlético Saguntino |
| 9= | Region of Murcia | 1 | Murcia |
| 9= | Extremadura | 1 | Extremadura |

== Regional tournaments ==
- Andalusia East & Melilla (Note: Due to its size, Andalusia has two Tercera División leagues (one for Western/Lower Andalusia, the other for Eastern/Upper Andalusia) and operated separate qualifying tournaments for the Copa Federación for each section until 2020, when the Andalusia Football Federation (RFAF) established a trophy for the entire region, the two finalists taking the qualification spots.)
- Andalusia West & Ceuta
- Aragon
- Asturias
- Balearic Islands
- (Basque Country (autonomous community)) Basque Country
- Canary Islands
- Cantabria
- Castile and León
- (Castilla–La Mancha) Castile-La Mancha
- Catalonia
- Extremadura
- (Galicia (Spain)) Galicia
- La Rioja
- (Community of Madrid) Madrid
- (Region of Murcia) Murcia
- Navarre
- Valencian Community

== See also ==
- Copa del Rey
- Campeonato de España de Aficionados
