= 1951–52 Copa Federación de España =

Tournament details
- Country: Spain
- Teams: 19

Final positions
- Champions: Jaén
- Runner-up: Orensana

Tournament statistics
- Matches played: 33
- Goals scored: 115 (3.48 per match)

The 1951–52 Copa Federación de España was the fourth staging (old competition) of the Copa Federación de España, a knockout competition for Spanish football clubs in Segunda División and Tercera División.

The competition began on 20 April 1952 and ended with the final on 15 June 1952, where Jaén became champion after defeating Orensana.

== Qualified teams ==
The following teams competed in the 1951–52 Copa Federación de España:

9 teams of 1951–52 Segunda División:

- Hércules
- Huesca
- Levante
- Mallorca
- Murcia
- Orensana
- Osasuna
- Plus Ultra
- Salamanca

10 teams of 1951–52 Tercera División:

- Almería
- Avilés
- Burgos
- Cacereño
- Eibar
- Jaén
- La Felguera
- Orihuela
- Tortosa
- Villena

== Competition ==
=== First round ===
Team 1	Agg.	Team 2	1st leg	2nd leg
Tortosa	w / o	Huesca	–	–
Orihuela	3–4	Murcia	3–1	0–3
Cacereño	2–5	Salamanca	0–2	2–3

=== Second round ===
Team 1	Agg.	Team 2	1st leg	2nd leg
Tortosa	8–6	Mallorca	6–4	2–2
Orensana	6–2	La Felguera	4–1	2–1
Burgos	2–0	Avilés	2-2	2–0
Eibar	2–3	Osasuna	2–0	0–3
Villena	7–2	Levante	6–1	1–1
Murcia	6–2	Almería	5–0	1–2
Plus Ultra	1–4	Hércules	0–1	1–3
Salamanca	1–5	Jaén	1–2	0–3

=== Third round ===
Team 1	Agg.	Team 2	1st leg	2nd leg
Osasuna	3–4	Tortosa	3–2	0–2
Orensana	3–2	Burgos	2–2	1–0
Villena	5–6	Murcia	4–1	1–5
Jaén	3–0	Hércules	2–0	1–0

=== Semi-finals ===
Team 1	Agg.	Team 2	1st leg	2nd leg
Orensana	5–3	Tortosa	5–1	0–2
Murcia	0–7	Jaén	0–3	0–4

=== Final ===
Team 1	Score	Team 2
Jaén	3–1	Orensana
