= Real Jaén =

Association football club in Spain

- Full name: Real Jaén Club de Fútbol, S.A.D.
- Nicknames: Los Blancos (The Whites); Los Lagartos (The Lizards)
- Founded: 1929; 97 years ago
- Stadium: Nuevo La Victoria
- Capacity: 12,569
- President: Sebastián Moya
- Head coach: Manolo Herrero
- League: Primera Federación – Group 2
- 2025–26: Segunda Federación – Group 4, 5th of 18 (promoted via play-offs)
- Website: realjaen.com
Home colours	Away colours

Real Jaén Club de Fútbol, S.A.D. is a Spanish football team based in Jaén, in the autonomous community of Andalusia. Founded in 1929 it plays in Primera Federación – Group 2, holding home matches at Nuevo Estadio de La Victoria, with a capacity of 12,569 spectators. The club's biggest achievement has been playing 3 seasons in La Liga, the Spanish top tier, during the 1950s.

== History ==
Logo used from 2001 to 2022

The club was founded in 1922, and was refounded in 1929 as Sociedad Olímpica Jiennense. They changed their name to Real Jaén Club de Fútbol in 1947. The team did not enroll in a national division until 1943 when it promoted to the Tercera Division. It immediately became a dominant team in the Spanish third division usually finishing in the top four.

After nine seasons in the Tercera Division, the "Lizards" were promoted to the Segunda Division in 1952. Their good form continued in the second division, as Real Jaén won the 1952–53 Segunda Division group south, and were promoted to La Liga for the first time ever. They won all of their home games that season including a 9–0 home win over fellow Andalusians Granada CF.

During Real Jaén's first ever season in the Spanish top tier (1953–54) the team finished 14th with 11 wins, 6 draws, and 13 defeats, meaning they obtained 28 points. This meant the team would be placed in the relegation group along with CA Osasuna and four teams from the Segunda Division. Jaén finished in last place with only one win and were relegated after just one season in the Spanish top flight.

Following their relegation from La Liga in 1954, key players departed from the team and Jaén finished in 7th place the following season. The next season was a lot better for Jaén. They won the group South of Segunda Division, this time in the season 1955–56. This meant that La Liga again awaited the Real Jaén.

In their second top flight season, Jaén barely avoided relegation, finishing 14th, one point above relegated Deportivo de La Coruña. Jaén stayed in the Spanish elite. Their third top flight season was less successful and the team finished last with only 20 points collected. Real Jaén was relegated after two years in La Liga. The biggest highlight of their season was probably a 1–0 home win over powerhouse FC Barcelona.

Following their second top flight relegation, Real Jaén were never able to compete for a return to the elite. Their best season was 1959–60, when the team achieved a 3rd-place finish coming up two points behind the second placed Cordoba CF, which qualified the team for the promotion playoffs. Following the 1962–63 season, the "Lizards" were relegated to the Tercera Division. This was the first time the team played there since 1952.

For the following 12 seasons, Jaén only made one return to the Segunda, in 1967, but were immediately relegated. They returned to the second tier in 1976 and remained there for three seasons until 1979 when they were relegated to the newly created Segunda Division B, the new third tier in Spanish football. Jaén stayed in the third level until 1986, when the team was relegated to the Tercera Division, this time the fourth tier. They bounced between the Segunda B and the Tercera the following years.

In 1997, the team returned to the Segunda Division for the first time since 1979. The 1997–98 season was bad however, as they finished last and went back to the Segunda B. Real Jaén returned to the Segunda in 2000. They achieved a 10th-place finish in the 2000–01 season, but finished last the following season and were relegated again. The following 11 seasons were spent in the Segunda B, until 2013, when Jaén again returned to the Segunda. The "Lizards" finished second to last, in 21st place, meaning relegation followed again.

In 2017, Jaén finished 19th in the Segunda B, and were relegated to the Tercera Division for the first time since 1991.

Here, being in the 4th level of the Spanish football, the club finished 3rd in the 2017–18 season and remained in that category. On July 5, 2019, Real Jaén presented Alberto González as a new coach for the 2019–20 season.

== Season to season ==
Season	Tier	Division	Place	Copa del Rey
1941–42	3	1ª Reg.	3rd	
1942–43	3	1ª Reg.	4th	
1943–44	3	3ª	2nd	Fourth round
1944–45	3	3ª	4th	
1945–46	3	3ª	2nd	
1946–47	3	3ª	2nd	
1947–48	3	3ª	8th	Third round
1948–49	3	3ª	10th	First round
1949–50	3	3ª	11th	
1950–51	3	3ª	3rd	
1951–52	3	3ª	1st	
1952–53	2	2ª	1st	Third round
1953–54	1	1ª	14th	
1954–55	2	2ª	7th	
1955–56	2	2ª	1st	Quarterfinals
1956–57	1	1ª	14th	Round of 16
1957–58	1	1ª	16th	Quarterfinals
1958–59	2	2ª	9th	First round
1959–60	2	2ª	3rd	First round
1960–61	2	2ª	14th	First round

Season	Tier	Division	Place	Copa del Rey
1961–62	2	2ª	9th	First round
1962–63	2	2ª	14th	Round of 16
1963–64	3	3ª	4th	
1964–65	3	3ª	1st	
1965–66	3	3ª	5th	
1966–67	3	3ª	1st	
1967–68	2	2ª	11th	First round
1968–69	3	3ª	5th	
1969–70	3	3ª	8th	First round
1970–71	3	3ª	8th	Second round
1971–72	3	3ª	3rd	First round
1972–73	3	3ª	9th	First round
1973–74	3	3ª	10th	Second round
1974–75	3	3ª	12th	Third round
1975–76	3	3ª	1st	Second round
1976–77	2	2ª	4th	First round
1977–78	2	2ª	15th	Second round
1978–79	2	2ª	17th	Third round
1979–80	3	2ª B	12th	First round
1980–81	3	2ª B	7th	

Season	Tier	Division	Place	Copa del Rey
1981–82	3	2ª B	15th	First round
1982–83	3	2ª B	12th	
1983–84	3	2ª B	3rd	
1984–85	3	2ª B	7th	Second round
1985–86	3	2ª B	18th	Second round
1986–87	4	3ª	5th	
1987–88	4	3ª	1st	First round
1988–89	3	2ª B	11th	
1989–90	3	2ª B	17th	
1990–91	4	3ª	4th	First round
1991–92	3	2ª B	10th	Second round
1992–93	3	2ª B	4th	Round of 16
1993–94	3	2ª B	4th	First round
1994–95	3	2ª B	4th	Third round
1995–96	3	2ª B	1st	First round
1996–97	3	2ª B	3rd	First round
1997–98	2	2ª	20th	Second round
1998–99	3	2ª B	8th	First round
1999–2000	3	2ª B	4th	
2000–01	2	2ª	10th	Round of 32

Season	Tier	Division	Place	Copa del Rey
2001–02	2	2ª	22nd	Round of 32
2002–03	3	2ª B	12th	Round of 64
2003–04	3	2ª B	12th	
2004–05	3	2ª B	9th	
2005–06	3	2ª B	13th	
2006–07	3	2ª B	6th	
2007–08	3	2ª B	9th	Second round
2008–09	3	2ª B	2nd	
2009–10	3	2ª B	3rd	First round
2010–11	3	2ª B	8th	Second Round
2011–12	3	2ª B	4th	Second Round
2012–13	3	2ª B	1st	Round of 32
2013–14	2	2ª	21st	Round of 32
2014–15	3	2ª B	11th	First Round
2015–16	3	2ª B	10th	
2016–17	3	2ª B	19th	
2017–18	4	3ª	3rd	
2018–19	4	3ª	1st	Second round
2019–20	4	3ª	4th	Second round
2020–21	4	3ª	7th / 1st	

Season	Tier	Division	Place	Copa del Rey
2021–22	5	3ª RFEF	13th	
2022–23	5	3ª Fed.	2nd	
2023–24	5	3ª Fed.	2nd	First round
2024–25	5	3ª Fed.	2nd	First round
2025–26	4	2ª Fed.	5th	First round
2026–27	3	1ª Fed.		TBD

- 3 seasons in La Liga
- 16 seasons in Segunda División
- 1 season in Primera Federación
- 31 seasons in Segunda División B
- 1 season in Segunda Federación
- 28 seasons in Tercera División
- 4 seasons in Tercera Federación

== Honours ==
- Segunda División
  - Winners (2): 1952–53, 1955–56
- Segunda División B
  - Winners (2): 1995–96, 2012–13
- Tercera División
  - Winners (6): 1951–52, 1964–65, 1966–67, 1975–76, 1987–88, 2018–19
- Copa Federación
  - Winners (2): 1951–52, 2008–09

== Current squad ==
As of 4 November 2026

Note: Flags indicate national team as defined under FIFA eligibility rules; some limited exceptions apply. Players may hold more than one non-FIFA nationality.

No.	Pos.	Nation	Player
1	GK	ESP	Jaime Morillas
2	DF	ESP	David Montejano
3	DF	ESP	David Serrano
4	DF	ESP	Jaume Pol
5	DF	ESP	David Márquez
6	MF	ESP	José Álvarez
7	MF	ESP	Fran Gallego
8	MF	ESP	Antonio Caballero
9	FW	ESP	Marco Siverio
10	MF	ESP	Adri Paz
11	FW	ESP	Mario Martos
12	DF	BUL	Cristian Pehlivanov

No.	Pos.	Nation	Player
13	GK	ESP	Salvi Carrasco
14	MF	ESP	Peque Polo
15	FW	ALG	Yanis Senhadji
16	FW	ESP	Diego Fuentes
17	DF	ESP	Javi Moyano
18	MF	ESP	Nacho Castillo
19	FW	MLI	Moha Keita
20	DF	ESP	Mauro Cabello
21	FW	MAR	Moha Sanhaji
22	MF	ESP	Óscar Lozano
23	MF	ESP	Busi
24	DF	ESP	Álex Pérez

=== Reserve team ===
Note: Flags indicate national team as defined under FIFA eligibility rules; some limited exceptions apply. Players may hold more than one non-FIFA nationality.

No.	Pos.	Nation	Player
27	DF	MTN	Seydou Fall

=== Out on loan ===
Note: Flags indicate national team as defined under FIFA eligibility rules; some limited exceptions apply. Players may hold more than one non-FIFA nationality.

No.	Pos.	Nation	Player
—	DF	ESP	Rubén Ávila (at Ciudad de Lucena until 30 June 2027)
—	DF	ESP	Pedro Fernández (at Guadalajara until 30 June 2027)
—	DF	ESP	Salvi Vera (at Puente Genil until 30 June 2027)
—	FW	ESP	Adrian Fernández (at Marbella until 30 June 2027)

No.	Pos.	Nation	Player
—	FW	ESP	Diego Morcillo (at Coria until 30 June 2027)
—	FW	ESP	Abel Sánchez (at Don Benito until 30 June 2027)
—	FW	CIV	Sako Siaka (at Alhaurino until 30 June 2027)

== Famous players ==
Note: this list includes players that have appeared in at least 100 league games and/or have reached international status.

- (Argentina) José Basualdo
- (Argentina) Claudio García
- (Colombia) Jorge Serna
- (Dominican Republic) Tano
- (Equatorial Guinea) Iván Zarandona
- (Liberia) Joel Johnson
- (Paraguay) Carlos Torres
- (Spain) Juan Antonio Anquela
- (Spain) Jesús Castellanos
- (Spain) Diego Cascón
- (Spain) Manolo Herrero
- (Spain) Manolo Jiménez
- (Spain) Fran Machado
- (Spain) Javi Moyano
- (Spain) Iñigo Ros
- (Spain) Antonio Rueda
- (Spain) Francisco Sutil
- (Tunisia) Adel Sellimi

== Women's football ==
Real Jaén was represented in the 2009–10 Superliga Femenina by FCF Atlético Jiennense.
