= AD Fundación Logroñés =

Spanish football team

Fundación Logroñés
- Full name: Asociación Deportiva; Fundación Logroñés
- Founded: 1999
- Dissolved: 2009
- Ground: Mundial 82, Logroño, La Rioja, Spain
- Capacity: 3,500
- 2008–09: 3ª - Group 16, 19th
Home colours	Away colours

Asociación Deportiva Fundación Logroñés was a Spanish football team based in Logroño in the autonomous community of La Rioja. Founded in 1999, it played in 3ª División - Group 16 until 2008–09 season. The club was dissolved in 2009 due to impossibility to find funds for manage the club. Its stadium was Estadio Mundial 82 with a capacity of 3,500 seaters.

== Season to season ==
Season	Tier	Division	Place	Copa del Rey
2001–02	5	Reg. Pref.	10th	
2002–03	5	Reg. Pref.	8th	
2003–04	5	Reg. Pref.	2nd	
2004–05	4	3ª	2nd	
2005–06	4	3ª	1st	
2006–07	4	3ª	2nd	
2007–08	4	3ª	11th	
2008–09	4	3ª	19th	

- 5 seasons in Tercera División
