= Atlético Calatayud =

- Full name: Atlético Calatayud
- Founded: 1995
- Ground: San Íñigo, Calatayud, Aragon, Spain
- Capacity: 2,000
- Chairman: (Spain) Jaime Navarro
- Manager: (Spain) Richi Gil
- League: Regional Preferente – Group 2
- 2024–25: Regional Preferente – Group 2, 3rd of 18
Home colours	Away colours

Atlético Calatayud is a Spanish football team based in Calatayud in the community of Aragon. Founded in 1995, it plays in Regional Preferente – Group 2.

== Season to season ==
Season	Tier	Division	Place	Copa del Rey
1995–96	7	2ª Reg.	2nd	
1996–97	6	1ª Reg.	9th	
1997–98	6	1ª Reg.	4th	
1998–99	6	1ª Reg.	3rd	
1999–2000	6	1ª Reg.	8th	
2000–01	6	1ª Reg.	1st	
2001–02	5	Reg. Pref.	4th	
2002–03	5	Reg. Pref.	2nd	
2003–04	4	3ª	16th	
2004–05	4	3ª	13th	
2005–06	4	3ª	12th	
2006–07	4	3ª	9th	
2007–08	4	3ª	9th	
2008–09	4	3ª	10th	
2009–10	4	3ª	15th	
2010–11	4	3ª	7th	
2011–12	4	3ª	7th	
2012–13	4	3ª	14th	
2013–14	4	3ª	18th	
2014–15	5	Reg. Pref.	15th	

Season	Tier	Division	Place	Copa del Rey
2015–16	6	1ª Reg.	2nd	
2016–17	5	Reg. Pref.	4th	
2017–18	5	Reg. Pref.	5th	
2018–19	5	Reg. Pref.	10th	
2019–20	5	Reg. Pref.	13th	
2020–21	5	Reg. Pref.	5th	
2021–22	6	Reg. Pref.	9th	
2022–23	6	Reg. Pref.	4th	
2023–24	6	Reg. Pref.	3rd	
2024–25	6	Reg. Pref.	3rd	
2025–26	6	Reg. Pref.		

- 11 seasons in Tercera División
