= SD Oyonesa =

Association football club in Spain

Oyonesa
- Full name: Sociedad Deportiva Oyonesa
- Founded: 1928
- Ground: El Espinar, Oyón, Álava, Spain
- Capacity: 1,500
- Chairman: (Spain) Manuel Martinez
- Manager: (Spain) Fernando Fuertes Bezares
- League: Tercera Federación – Group 16
- 2025–26: Tercera Federación – Group 16, 5th of 18
Home colours	Away colours

Sociedad Deportiva Oyonesa is a Spanish football team based in Oyón, Álava in the Basque Country, but play in La Rioja. Founded in 1928, it plays in Tercera Federación – Group 16. Its stadium is Estadio Luis Asarta with a capacity of 1,500 seats.

== Season to season ==
Season	Tier	Division	Place	Copa del Rey
1982–83	7	2ª Reg.	3rd	
1983–84	6	1ª Reg.	9th	
1984–85	6	1ª Reg.	13th	
1985–86	6	1ª Reg.	5th	
1986–87	5	Reg. Pref.	14th	
1987–88	5	Reg. Pref.	3rd	
1988–89	5	Reg. Pref.	16th	
1989–90	5	Reg. Pref.	16th	
1990–1998	DNP			
1998–99	5	Reg. Pref.	8th	
1999–2000	5	Reg. Pref.	8th	
2000–01	5	Reg. Pref.	8th	
2001–02	5	Reg. Pref.	9th	
2002–03	5	Reg. Pref.	7th	
2003–04	5	Reg. Pref.	4th	
2004–05	4	3ª	12th	
2005–06	4	3ª	6th	
2006–07	4	3ª	5th	
2007–08	4	3ª	9th	
2008–09	4	3ª	7th	

Season	Tier	Division	Place	Copa del Rey
2009–10	4	3ª	1st	
2010–11	4	3ª	8th	First round
2011–12	4	3ª	8th	
2012–13	4	3ª	5th	
2013–14	4	3ª	7th	
2014–15	4	3ª	10th	
2011–12	4	3ª	10th	
2016–17	4	3ª	10th	
2017–18	4	3ª	17th	
2018–19	4	3ª	11th	
2019–20	4	3ª	8th	
2020–21	4	3ª	6th / 5th	
2021–22	5	3ª RFEF	7th	
2022–23	5	3ª Fed.	5th	
2023–24	5	3ª Fed.	6th	
2024–25	5	3ª Fed.	5th	
2025–26	5	3ª Fed.	5th	
2026–27	5	3ª Fed.		

- 17 seasons in Tercera División
- 6 seasons in Tercera Federación/Tercera División RFEF
