= CD Anguiano =

Association football club in Spain

Anguiano
- Full name: Club Deportivo Anguiano
- Founded: 1995
- Ground: Isla, Anguiano, La Rioja, Spain
- Capacity: 1,000
- President: (Spain) José Neila
- Head coach: (Spain) Adrián Gallego
- League: Tercera Federación – Group 16
- 2025–26: Tercera Federación – Group 16, 6th of 18
Home colours	Away colours

Club Deportivo Anguiano is a Spanish football team based in Anguiano in the autonomous community of La Rioja. Founded in 1995, it plays in Tercera Federación – Group 16. Its stadium is Estadio Isla with a capacity of 1,000 seats.

== History ==
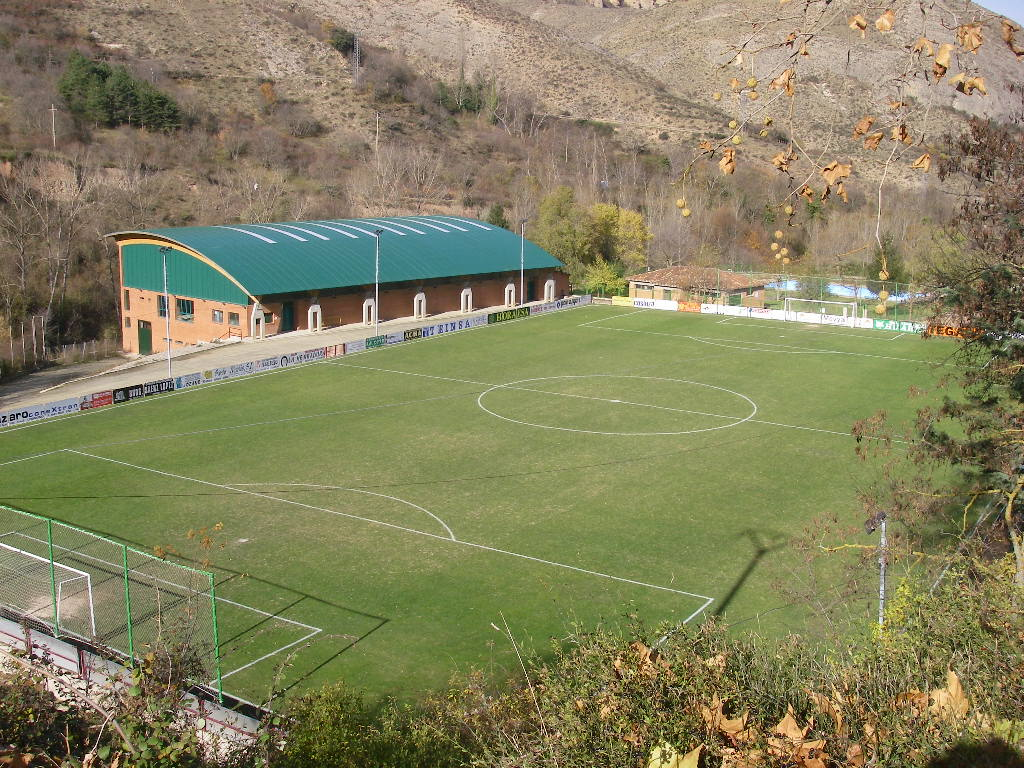
Campo Isla

In the 2015–16 season the club finished 6th in the Tercera División, Group 16. The next season in Tercera the club finished also on the 6th place.

== Season to season ==
Season	Tier	Division	Place	Copa del Rey
1995–96	5	Reg. Pref.	20th	
1996–97	5	Reg. Pref.	12th	
1997–98	5	Reg. Pref.	9th	
1998–99	5	Reg. Pref.	3rd	
1999–2000	5	Reg. Pref.	7th	
2000–01	5	Reg. Pref.	7th	
2001–02	5	Reg. Pref.	5th	
2002–03	5	Reg. Pref.	2nd	
2003–04	5	Reg. Pref.	8th	
2004–05	4	3ª	5th	
2005–06	4	3ª	7th	
2006–07	4	3ª	4th	
2007–08	4	3ª	2nd	
2008–09	4	3ª	3rd	
2009–10	4	3ª	4th	
2010–11	4	3ª	3rd	
2011–12	4	3ª	7th	
2012–13	4	3ª	10th	
2013–14	4	3ª	3rd	
2014–15	4	3ª	6th	

Season	Tier	Division	Place	Copa del Rey
2014–15	4	3ª	6th	
2015–16	4	3ª	6th	
2016–17	4	3ª	4th	
2017–18	4	3ª	6th	
2018–19	4	3ª	7th	
2019–20	4	3ª	6th	
2020–21	4	3ª	2nd / 5th	
2021–22	5	3ª RFEF	3rd	
2022–23	5	3ª Fed.	6th	
2023–24	5	3ª Fed.	4th	
2024–25	4	2ª Fed.	15th	
2025–26	5	3ª Fed.	6th	
2026–27	5	3ª Fed.		

- 1 season in Segunda Federación
- 18 seasons in Tercera División
- 5 seasons in Tercera Federación/Tercera División RFEF
