= Marino de Luanco =

Marino
- Full name: Club Marino de Luanco
- Founded: 1931; 95 years ago
- Stadium: Miramar
- Capacity: 3,500
- President: Luis Gallego
- Head coach: Sergio Sánchez
- League: Segunda Federación – Group 1
- 2025–26: Segunda Federación – Group 1, 12th of 18
- Website: clubmarinodeluanco.com
Home colours	Away colours

Club Marino de Luanco is a Spanish football team based in Luanco, in the autonomous community of Asturias. Founded in 1931 it plays in Segunda Federación – Group 1, holding home games at Estadio Miramar, with a capacity of 3,500 seats.

== History ==
Marino Luanco was founded in 1931 by a group of local people, mainly fishermen. It played its first games on La Ribera beach, where nowadays the Torneo Tenis Playa takes place. Four years later, the team was registered in the Asturian Football Federation.

Marino played for the first time in Tercera División in the 1956–57 season. During the next 40 years, the club alternated between Tercera and Regional Leagues, until it was promoted to Segunda División B in 1996. In its first season, Marino was relegated after finishing last.

The club returned to Segunda División B in 2001, after being the champion of the Asturian group of Tercera and winning the Copa Federación de España and was close to reach the promotion playoffs to Segunda División in the 2001–02 season.

Marino continues to alternate seasons between Segunda RFEF and Tercera División and has consolidated as one of the most important clubs in Asturias.

== Season to season ==
Season	Tier	Division	Place	Copa del Rey
1940–41	6	3ª Reg.	1st	
1941–42	5	2ª Reg.	3rd	
1942–43	5	2ª Reg.		
1943–44	5	2ª Reg.	3rd	
1944–45	5	2ª Reg.	2nd	
1945–46	5	2ª Reg.	3rd	
1946–47	5	2ª Reg.	4th	
1947–48	5	2ª Reg.	5th	
1948–49	5	2ª Reg.	6th	
1949–50	5	2ª Reg.	3rd	
1950–51	5	2ª Reg.	5th	
1951–52	4	1ª Reg.	10th	
1952–53	4	1ª Reg.		
1953–54	4	1ª Reg.	6th	
1954–55	4	1ª Reg.	4th	
1955–56	4	1ª Reg.	1st	
1956–57	3	3ª	7th	
1957–58	3	3ª	12th	
1958–59	3	3ª	14th	
1959–60	3	3ª	13th	

Season	Tier	Division	Place	Copa del Rey
1960–61	3	3ª	15th	
1961–62	4	1ª Reg.	5th	
1962–63	3	3ª	15th	
1963–64	4	1ª Reg.	6th	
1964–65	4	1ª Reg.	11th	
1965–66	4	1ª Reg.	3rd	
1966–67	4	1ª Reg.	1st	
1967–68	3	3ª	11th	
1968–69	4	1ª Reg.	8th	
1969–70	4	1ª Reg.	12th	
1970–71	4	1ª Reg.	6th	
1971–72	4	1ª Reg.	19th	
1972–73	5	2ª Reg.	5th	
1973–74	5	2ª Reg. P.	11th	
1974–75	5	2ª Reg. P.	2nd	
1975–76	4	Reg. Pref.	16th	
1976–77	4	Reg. Pref.	17th	
1977–78	5	Reg. Pref.	13th	
1978–79	5	Reg. Pref.	13th	
1979–80	5	Reg. Pref.	16th	

Season	Tier	Division	Place	Copa del Rey
1980–81	5	Reg. Pref.	2nd	
1981–82	5	Reg. Pref.	3rd	
1982–83	5	Reg. Pref.	4th	
1983–84	5	Reg. Pref.	5th	
1984–85	5	Reg. Pref.	2nd	
1985–86	4	3ª	10th	
1986–87	4	3ª	14th	
1987–88	4	3ª	3rd	
1988–89	4	3ª	10th	
1989–90	4	3ª	11th	
1990–91	4	3ª	6th	
1991–92	4	3ª	5th	First round
1992–93	4	3ª	10th	First round
1993–94	4	3ª	4th	
1994–95	4	3ª	10th	
1995–96	4	3ª	3rd	
1996–97	3	2ª B	20th	First round
1997–98	4	3ª	8th	
1998–99	4	3ª	1st	
1999–2000	4	3ª	3rd	

Season	Tier	Division	Place	Copa del Rey
2000–01	4	3ª	1st	
2001–02	3	2ª B	5th	Round of 64
2002–03	3	2ª B	17th	Preliminary
2003–04	4	3ª	4th	
2004–05	3	2ª B	15th	
2005–06	3	2ª B	11th	
2006–07	3	2ª B	13th	
2007–08	3	2ª B	15th	
2008–09	3	2ª B	20th	
2009–10	4	3ª	2nd	
2010–11	4	3ª	1st	
2011–12	3	2ª B	13th	Second round
2012–13	3	2ª B	11th	
2013–14	3	2ª B	6th	
2014–15	3	2ª B	20th	First round
2015–16	4	3ª	4th	
2016–17	4	3ª	6th	
2017–18	4	3ª	3rd	
2018–19	4	3ª	2nd	
2019–20	3	2ª B	18th	First round

Season	Tier	Division	Place	Copa del Rey
2020–21	3	2ª B	6th	
2021–22	4	2ª RFEF	12th	
2022–23	4	2ª Fed.	9th	
2023–24	4	2ª Fed.	11th	
2024–25	4	2ª Fed.	10th	
2025–26	4	2ª Fed.	12th	
2026–27	4	2ª Fed.		

- 14 seasons in Segunda División B
- 6 seasons in Segunda Federación/Segunda División RFEF
- 29 seasons in Tercera División

== Current squad ==
As of 5 February 2026

Note: Flags indicate national team as defined under FIFA eligibility rules; some limited exceptions apply. Players may hold more than one non-FIFA nationality.

No.	Pos.	Nation	Player
1	GK	ESP	Dennis Díaz
2	DF	ESP	Borja Álvarez
3	DF	ESP	Fernando Somolinos
5	DF	ESP	Pedro Orfila
6	DF	ARG	Tomás Fuentes
7	FW	ESP	Samu Pérez
8	MF	ESP	Pelayo Pérez
9	FW	MEX	Miguel Levya
10	FW	ESP	Oscar Fernández
11	MF	ESP	Alberto Lora
12	DF	ESP	Dailos Tejera

No.	Pos.	Nation	Player
13	GK	ESP	Nel González
14	MF	ESP	Chus Ruiz
15	DF	ESP	Guaya (captain)
16	FW	ESP	Marcos Bravo
17	DF	ESP	Andreu Talarn
18	FW	ESP	Marcos Fernández (on loan from Sporting Atlético)
19	FW	ESP	Dani Martí (on loan from Sporting Atlético)
20	DF	ESP	Berto González
21	MF	ESP	Alex Basurto
23	MF	ESP	Iñigo Villaldea

== Honours ==
- Tercera División (3): 1998–99, 2000–01, 2010–11
- Copa RFEF (1): 2000–01
- Copa RFEF (Asturias tournament) (8): 2000, 2004, 2006, 2009, 2013, 2015, 2023, 2025

== Famous players ==
- (Ivory Coast) Idrissa Keita
- (Equatorial Guinea) Kily
- (Spain) Francisco Javier Castaño
