= Haro Deportivo =

Spanish football club

- Full name: Club Haro Deportivo
- Founded: 1914; 112 years ago
- Ground: El Mazo, Haro, La Rioja, Spain
- Capacity: 4,300
- Chairman: Jaime Hueda
- Manager: Roberto Ochoa
- League: Tercera Federación – Group 16
- 2025–26: Tercera Federación – Group 16, 7th of 18
Home colours	Away colours

Club Haro Deportivo is a Spanish football team based in Haro, in the autonomous community of La Rioja. Founded in 1914, it plays in Tercera Federación – Group 16, holding home matches at Estadio El Mazo, with a capacity of 4,300 seats.

== History ==
Haro Deportivo finished the 2017-18 season in the 4th position in the Tercera División. In the 2018-19 season Haro became champion of the Tercera División, Group 16 and promoted to the Segunda División B.

=== Club background ===
- Haro Sport Club (1921–1929)
- Haro Deportivo (1931–1936)
- Haro Deportivo de Educación y Descanso (1946–1950)
- Club Haro Deportivo (1950–)

== Season to season ==
Season	Tier	Division	Place	Copa del Rey
1935–36	4	1ª Reg.	3rd	
1936–1946	DNP			
1946–47	4	1ª Reg.	4th	
1947–48	4	1ª Reg.	2nd	
1948–49	4	1ª Reg.	1st	
1949–50	4	1ª Reg.	14th	
1950–51	4	1ª Reg.	4th	
1951–52	4	1ª Reg.	10th	
1952–53	4	1ª Reg.	11th	
1953–54	4	1ª Reg.	6th	
1954–55	4	1ª Reg.	6th	
1955–56	4	1ª Reg.	11th	
1956–57	DNP			
1957–58	5	2ª Reg.	2nd	
1958–59	4	1ª Reg.	6th	
1959–60	4	1ª Reg.	7th	
1960–61	4	1ª Reg.	7th	
1961–62	4	1ª Reg.	5th	
1962–63	4	1ª Reg.	11th	
1963–64	4	1ª Reg.	7th	

Season	Tier	Division	Place	Copa del Rey
1964–65	4	1ª Reg.	1st	
1965–66	3	3ª	13th	
1966–67	3	3ª	11th	
1967–68	3	3ª	11th	
1968–69	4	1ª Reg.	2nd	
1969–70	4	1ª Reg.	6th	
1970–71	4	1ª Reg.	15th	
1971–72	5	2ª Reg.	1st	
1972–73	4	1ª Reg.	13th	
1973–74	4	1ª Reg.	8th	
1974–75	4	Reg. Pref.	4th	
1975–76	4	Reg. Pref.	6th	
1976–77	4	Reg. Pref.	12th	
1977–78	5	Reg. Pref.	8th	
1978–79	5	Reg. Pref.	1st	
1979–80	4	3ª	15th	First round
1980–81	4	3ª	20th	
1981–82	5	Reg. Pref.	1st	
1982–83	4	3ª	12th	
1983–84	4	3ª	19th	

Season	Tier	Division	Place	Copa del Rey
1984–85	5	Reg. Pref.	9th	
1985–86	5	Reg. Pref.	9th	
1986–87	5	Reg. Pref.	3rd	
1987–88	5	Reg. Pref.	2nd	
1988–89	4	3ª	9th	
1989–90	4	3ª	13th	
1990–91	4	3ª	12th	
1991–92	4	3ª	16th	
1992–93	4	3ª	16th	
1993–94	4	3ª	17th	
1994–95	4	3ª	19th	
1995–96	5	Reg. Pref.	1st	
1996–97	4	3ª	4th	
1997–98	4	3ª	17th	
1998–99	4	3ª	14th	
1999–2000	4	3ª	10th	
2000–01	4	3ª	10th	
2001–02	4	3ª	16th	
2002–03	4	3ª	7th	
2003–04	4	3ª	4th	

Season	Tier	Division	Place	Copa del Rey
2004–05	3	2ª B	20th	
2005–06	4	3ª	3rd	
2006–07	4	3ª	1st	
2007–08	4	3ª	3rd	First round
2008–09	4	3ª	2nd	
2009–10	4	3ª	3rd	
2010–11	4	3ª	4th	
2011–12	4	3ª	3rd	
2012–13	4	3ª	1st	
2013–14	4	3ª	2nd	Third round
2014–15	4	3ª	4th	
2015–16	4	3ª	3rd	
2016–17	4	3ª	5th	
2017–18	4	3ª	4th	
2018–19	4	3ª	1st	
2019–20	3	2ª B	10th	Second round
2020–21	3	2ª B	10th / 5th	Second round
2021–22	5	3ª RFEF	10th	
2022–23	5	3ª Fed.	9th	
2023–24	5	3ª Fed.	15th	

Season	Tier	Division	Place	Copa del Rey
2024–25	5	3ª Fed.	13th	
2025–26	5	3ª Fed.	7th	
2026–27	5	3ª Fed.		

- 3 seasons in Segunda División B
- 36 seasons in Tercera División
- 6 seasons in Tercera Federación/Tercera División RFEF

== Current squad ==
As of 28 March 2021

Note: Flags indicate national team as defined under FIFA eligibility rules; some limited exceptions apply. Players may hold more than one non-FIFA nationality.

No.	Pos.	Nation	Player
1	GK	ESP	Fermín Sobrón
2	DF	ESP	Kevin Calle
4	DF	ESP	Jon Echaide
5	MF	ESP	Javi Duro
6	MF	ESP	Borja García
7	FW	ESP	Isaac Manjón
8	MF	ESP	Josua Pérez
9	FW	ESP	Mikel Bueno
10	MF	ESP	Joseba García
11	FW	ESP	Iván Garrido
12	DF	ESP	Ander Peciña (on loan from Alavés B)

No.	Pos.	Nation	Player
13	GK	ESP	Amador Zarco
14	MF	ESP	Jon Iru
15	DF	FIN	Valtteri Vesiaho
16	DF	ESP	Ander Egiluz
17	DF	ESP	Alberto Morgado
18	FW	ESP	Alex Valiño
19	FW	ESP	Adrián Butzke (on loan from Granada B)
20	MF	ESP	Gaizka Martínez
21	FW	ESP	Txomin Barcina
22	FW	ESP	Gabriel Lizárraga
22	DF	ESP	Héctor Martínez (on loan from Ibiza)
