= CD Marino de Cudillero =

Spanish football team

Marino Cudillero
- Full name: Club Deportivo Marino de Cudillero
- Founded: 1950; 2014 (refounded)
- Ground: La Roja, Cudillero, Asturias, Spain
- Capacity: 2,000
- Chairman: (Spain) Jesús Díez
- Manager: (Spain) Iván Palacios
- League: Tercera Asturfútbol – Group 4
- 2024–25: Tercera Asturfútbol – Group 4, 7th of 16
Home colours	Away colours

Club Deportivo Marino de Cudillero is a Spanish football team based in Cudillero, in the autonomous community of Asturias. Founded in 1950, it holds its home games at Estadio La Roja, which has a capacity of 2,000 spectators.

== History ==
Club Deportivo Cudillero was founded in 1950 and reformed in 2002 after disappearing in 1979.

On 10 October 2014, the club board communicated to the Royal Asturias Football Federation the club would not play the game of the round 8 of 2014–15 Tercera División against Caudal Deportivo, due to the non-payments to players and coaches. One week later, the club announced it would retire from the competition and it would be dissolved. In the meantime, Club Deportivo Marino de Cudillero (a naming which Cudillero also adopted in the 1980s) was founded separately and later took the club's heir.

=== Club background ===
Logo of CD Cudillero, used until 2014

- Club Deportivo Cudillero (1950–74; 2002–14)
- Club Deportivo Pixueto (1975–76; 1992–2000)
- Club Deportivo Marino de Cudillero (1980–91; 2014–)

== Season to season ==
=== Cudillero/Pixueto (1950–1976) ===
Season	Level	Division	Place	Copa del Rey
1964–65	5	2ª Reg.		
1965–66	5	2ª Reg.		
1966–67	5	2ª Reg.		
1967–68	5	2ª Reg.	1st	
1968–69	4	1ª Reg.	12th	
1969–70	4	1ª Reg.	5th	
1970–71	4	1ª Reg.	(R)	
1971–72	5	2ª Reg.		
1972–73	5	2ª Reg.		
1973–74	6	2ª Reg.	12th	
1974–75	DNP			
1975–76	6	2ª Reg.	8th	

=== Marino de Cudillero (1980–1991) ===
Season	Level	Division	Place	Copa del Rey
1982–83	7	2ª Reg.	1st	
1983–84	7	2ª Reg.	1st	
1984–85	6	1ª Reg.	5th	
1985–86	6	1ª Reg.	16th	
1986–87	6	1ª Reg.	16th	
1987–88	6	1ª Reg.	14th	
1988–89	6	1ª Reg.	9th	
1989–90	6	1ª Reg.	5th	
1990–91	6	1ª Reg.	(R)	

=== Pixueto/Cudillero (1992–2014) ===
Season	Level	Division	Place	Copa del Rey
1992–93	7	2ª Reg.	17th	
1993–94	7	2ª Reg.	16th	
1994–95	7	2ª Reg.	3rd	
1995–96	6	1ª Reg.	16th	
1996–97	6	1ª Reg.	20th	
1997–98	7	2ª Reg.	5th	
1998–99	7	2ª Reg.	5th	
1999–2000	7	2ª Reg.	11th	
2000–01	7	2ª Reg.	8th	
2001–02	7	2ª Reg.	1st	
2002–03	6	1ª Reg.	1st	
2003–04	5	Reg. Pref.	6th	

Season	Level	Division	Place	Copa del Rey
2004–05	5	Reg. Pref.	11th	
2005–06	5	Reg. Pref.	2nd	
2006–07	4	3ª	8th	
2007–08	4	3ª	5th	
2008–09	4	3ª	9th	
2009–10	4	3ª	14th	
2010–11	4	3ª	11th	
2011–12	4	3ª	10th	
2012–13	4	3ª	9th	
2013–14	4	3ª	8th	
2014–15	4	3ª	(R)	

- 9 seasons in Tercera División

=== Marino de Cudillero (2014–) ===
Season	Tier	Division	Place	Copa del Rey
2014–15	7	2ª Reg.	11th	
2015–16	7	2ª Reg.	9th	
2016–17	7	2ª Reg.	9th	
2017–18	7	2ª Reg.	4th	
2018–19	7	2ª Reg.	1st	
2019–20	6	1ª Reg.	15th	
2020–21	6	1ª Reg.	4th	
2021–22	7	1ª Reg.	9th	
2022–23	8	3ª RFFPA	5th	
2023–24	8	3ª Astur.	10th	
2024–25	8	3ª Astur.	7th	
2025–26	8	3ª Astur.		
