= Dani Peláez =

Spanish footballer

Personal information
- Full name: Daniel Peláez Bellido
- Date of birth: 4 April 1986 (age 40)
- Place of birth: Gijón, Spain
- Height: 1.76 m (5 ft 9 1/2 in)
- Position: Defensive midfielder

Youth career
- Sporting Gijón

Senior career*
Years	Team	Apps	(Gls)
2005–2007	Sporting B	0	(0)
2005–2007	→ Ceares (loan)	66	(13)
2007–2008	Málaga B	31	(0)
2008	Málaga	1	(0)
2008–2009	Lanzarote	6	(0)
2009	Marino	13	(0)
2009–2011	Llanes	34	(7)
2011–2013	Candás	59	(5)
2013–2014	Rabat Ajax	18	(3)
2014–2015	Lealtad	2	(0)
2015	Kendall Wanderers		
2016	SD Logroñés	12	(1)
2016–2017	Ceares	32	(4)
2017–2021	Gijón Industrial	78	(19)
2021–2022	Candás	17	(7)
- * Club domestic league appearances and goals

Daniel 'Dani' Peláez Bellido (born 4 April 1986) is a Spanish former professional footballer who played as a defensive midfielder.

== Football career ==
Born in Gijón, Asturias, Peláez graduated from Sporting de Gijón's youth setup, and made his senior debuts while on loan at lowly UC Ceares in the 2005–06 campaign, in Tercera División. In the 2007 summer he moved to another reserve team, Atlético Malagueño also in the fourth level.

Peláez made his first-team debut on 11 October 2007, coming on as a late substitute in a 2–1 away success over CD Tenerife for the season's Copa del Rey. He made his league debut on 17 February of the following year, again from the bench in a 3–1 home win against CD Castellón in the Segunda División championship.

On 29 July 2008 Peláez joined UD Lanzarote, in Segunda División B. However, he was released in December due to the club's financial problems, and joined fellow league team Club Marino de Luanco in the following month.

Peláez moved to fourth level's CD Llanes in October 2009. He appeared regularly for the club, and joined Candás CF in the same division in June 2011.

In August 2013 Peláez moved abroad for the first time in his career, signing for Maltese Premier League side Rabat Ajax F.C. After featuring regularly for the side during his only season, which ended in relegation, he returned to his native country and joined third level's CD Lealtad.

In July 2016, Peláez signed with fourth tier's UC Ceares, where he played eleven years ago. One year later, he moved to neighbours Gijón Industrial.
