= UC Ceares =

Association football club in Spain

Ceares
- Full name: Unión Club Ceares
- Nicknames: Ciares; Teyeros (Tilers); Brickers
- Short name: UCC
- Founded: 1946; 80 years ago
- Ground: La Cruz, Gijón, Asturias, Spain
- Capacity: 1,500
- Chairman: Alberto Álvarez
- Manager: Pablo Busto
- League: Tercera Federación – Group 2
- 2025–26: Tercera Federación – Group 2, 8th of 18
- Website: https://ucceares.com
Home colours	Away colours	Third colours

Unión Club Ceares is a Spanish football team based in the neighbourhood of Ceares, Gijón, in the autonomous community of Asturias. Founded in 1946, it plays in Tercera Federación – Group 2, holding home games at Campo de La Cruz, which has a capacity of 1,500 spectators.

== History ==
=== Early years ===
The club was founded in 1946 as a merger of two clubs: Fortuna and Reconquista. In 1965 and being Mr. José Ramón Elvira Sastre the president, UC Ceares promotes for the first time to Tercera División, but finished in the last position, being subsequently relegated. Ceares continued playing in regional divisions until 1986, year that the team returned to Tercera División and played in it two years.

=== 2000s: Comeback to Tercera División ===
In the seasons 2001–02 and 2002–03, Ceares achieved two consecutive promotions from Primera Regional to Tercera División with Rogelio García as head coach. He would coach UC Ceares during six consecutive seasons, with a break in 2007, remaining in Tercera starting the longest streak of the club in this division.

In 2007, former Real Sporting footballer José Antonio Redondo replaced him until 2009, when he resigned. With Redondo at the helm, on 5 April 2008, Ceares earned a 1–1 away draw in the last minute against Asturian powerhouse Oviedo and qualified for the semi-finals of the Asturian tournament of the RFEF Cup, where they were eliminated by Langreo.

Rogelio would take the team again until the end of the 2008–09 season. After that season, Florentino Angulo was hired as new manager. Angulo managed Ceares until 2012.

=== 2010s: "People's football" project and promotion playoffs ===
Before the 2011–12 season, a new board takes the control of the club and gives it a new philosophy based on a claim of social and people's sport and criticism the actual business in football. For this philosophy, Ceares board inspired on English football and clubs like St. Pauli or United of Manchester.

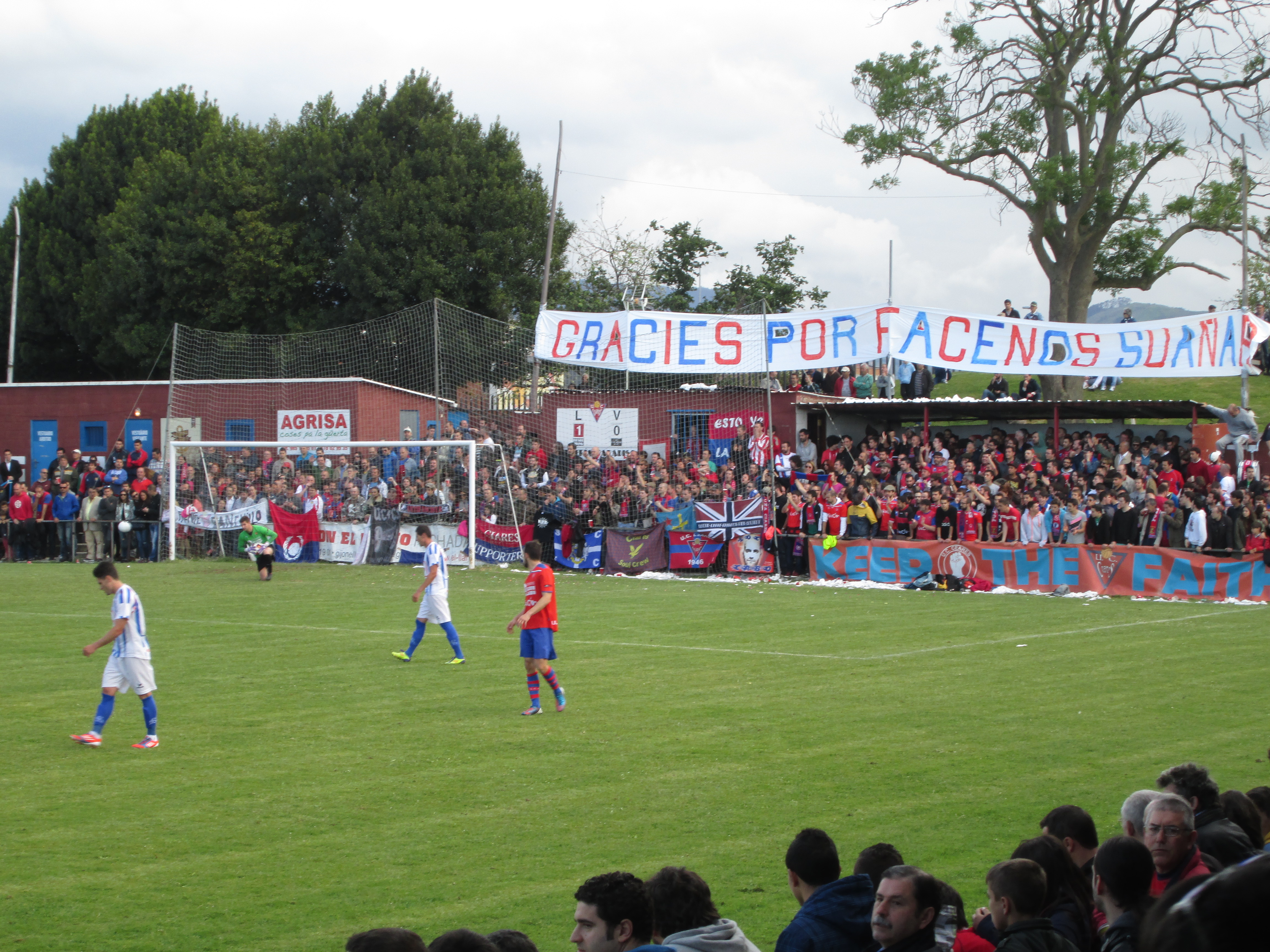
La Cruz stadium, full, at the playoffs game versus Águilas

The 2013–14 season was the 14th of the club in this league (the 11th consecutive one) and the second of Nacho Cabo as manager. Ceares started the season with only one defeat in the first fifteen games, earning 34 points, which allowed the club to lead the table during two weeks, after a win at L'Entregu CF by 1–3 in its 500th game in Tercera.

Finally, Ceares qualified for the promotion playoffs to Segunda División B in the last week, after winning by 0–3 to Luarca CF. The team finished in the third position with 74 points, 21 wins, 54 goals scored and only 31 allowed. All these numbers were records in the history of the club.

In the first round, Ceares dropped Águilas by 2–1 in the aggregate. In the first leg, the brickers earned a draw by 1–1 thanks to a goal of Pablo Martínez in the 87th minute. Martínez also scored the only goal in the second game. This was the second time La Cruz registered an attendance of 1,500 fans. The first one was in 2003, when Oviedo visited the field for the first time.

Ceares faced Trival Valderas, the champion of the group of Madrid, in the second round, but was widely defeated in the first leg, played in Gijón, by 0–3. The team earned a 2–2 draw at Alcorcón, in a game where Borja Noval missed a penalty when the game was 2–1 for the brickers.

18 May 2014	Águilas	1–1	Ceares	Águilas
17:00 (CEST)	Ginés Meca 65'	Report	Pablo Martínez 87'	Stadium: El Rubial; Attendance: 1,300; Referee: Pérez León

25 May 2014	Ceares	1–0 (2–1 agg.)	Águilas	Gijón
17:00 (CEST)	Pablo Martínez 35'	Report		Stadium: La Cruz; Attendance: 1,500; Referee: Martín Pérez

1 June 2014	Ceares	0–3	Trival Valderas	Gijón
17:00 (CEST)		Report	Óscar 16', 51'; Herrero 32'	Stadium: La Cruz; Attendance: 1,500; Referee: Díaz Álvarez

8 June 2014	Trival Valderas	2–2 (5–2 agg.)	Ceares	Alcorcón
11:30 (CEST)	Palacios 45'; Óscar 94'	Report	Ponte 63'; Juan Carlos 67'	Stadium: La Canaleja; Attendance: 750; Referee: Creus Rodríguez

On 30 August 2014, Bryan Jiménez became the first Ceares player who played an international game. He made his debut with the Dominican Republic national team in a lost friendly against El Salvador.

In 2015, Ceares signed a collaboration agreement with women's football club Gijón FF for sharing La Cruz stadium and to create a youth academy for boys and girls.

=== 2020–present: Tercera División title and first promotion ===
In the 2020–21 season, the one with a two-staged format, Ceares ended the first leg of the regular season as champion of one of the two subgroups. On 2 May 2021, Ceares had the option to directly promote to the newly created Segunda División RFEF, currently called Segunda Federación, that would replace the Segunda División B, by defeating San Martín at home. However, they had to wait one more week as they were widely beaten by 1–4. Seven days later, Ceares clinched the Tercera División title and promotion after beating 0–2 in a do-or-die match at L'Entregu.

9 May 2021	L'Entregu	0–2	Ceares	El Entrego
		Report	Aitor Cañedo 14'; Juan Carlos 67'	Stadium: Nuevo Nalón; Attendance: Limited to 300; Referee: Juan González Suárez

The first win in the new league arrived at round 3, after defeating Arenteiro by 2–0. However, a long streak of losses quickly demoted the team to the last position. On 30 November 2021, Ceares made its debut in the Copa del Rey, by facing local powerhouse Sporting de Gijón. The match was played at El Molinón, as La Cruz did not meet the requirements of the RFEF for hosting matches of this competition, and finished with a 0–1 defeat.

30 November 2021	Ceares	0–1	Sporting Gijón	Gijón
20:00		Report	César 38'	Stadium: El Molinón; Attendance: 7,000; Referee: Javier Iglesias Villanueva

However, Ceares finally could not avoid relegation and finished in the last position in their first experience in a league with teams out from Asturias.

On 1 May 2024, Ceares qualified again for the promotion playoffs to Segunda Federación with two rounds left, but this time was eliminated in the first round by Lealtad.

== Stadium ==
La Cruz
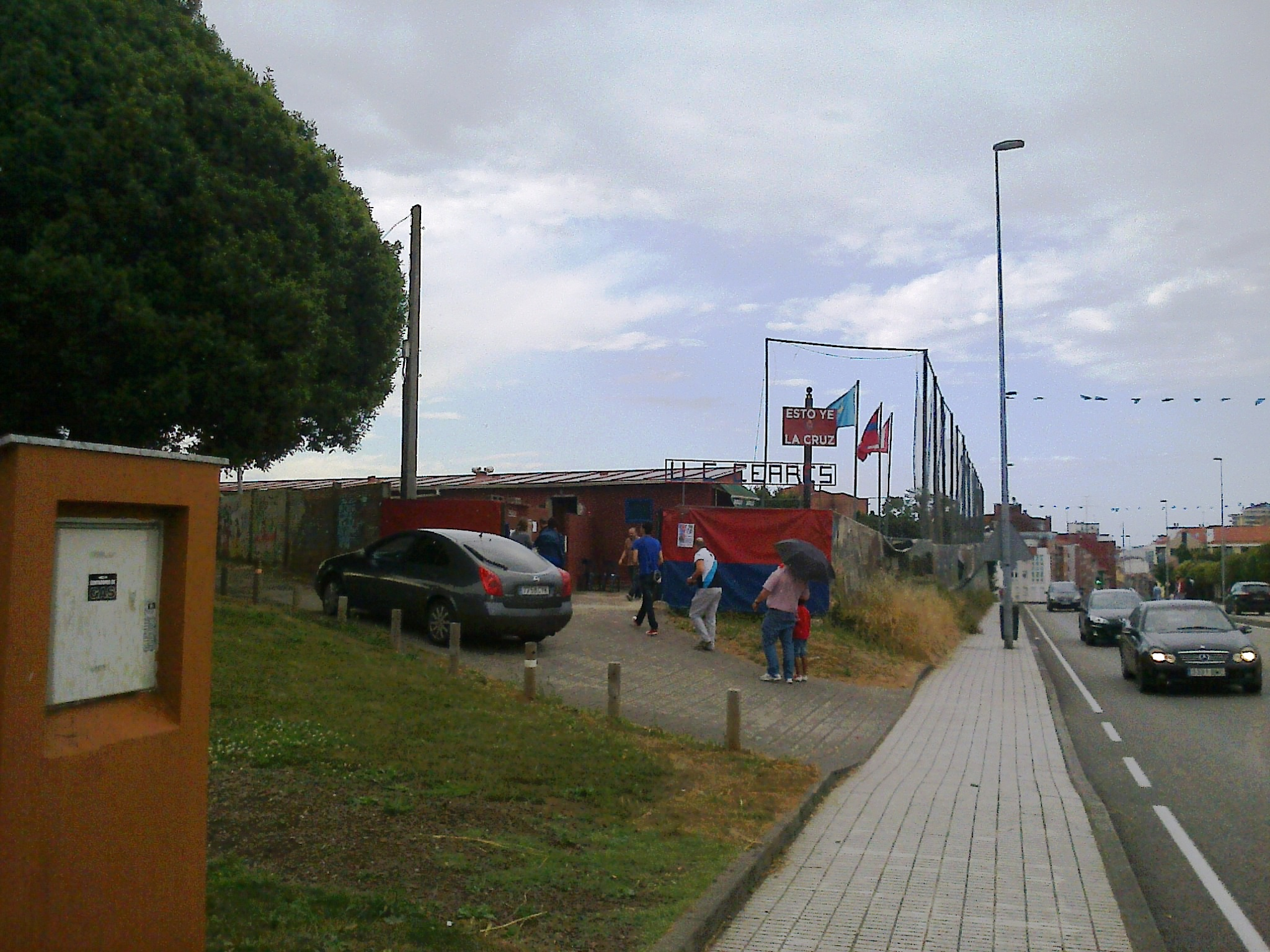
- Main entrance to La Cruz
- Interactive map of La Cruz
- Full name: Campo de La Cruz
- Location: Gijón, Spain
- Coordinates: 43.52940°N 5.65536°W
- Owner: UC Ceares
- Capacity: 1,500
- Surface: Grass
- Field size: 99 × 65 m

Construction
- Built: 1970s
- Opened: 8 January 1978; 48 years ago
- Renovated: 2004, 2020

Tenants
- UC Ceares; Gijón FF (2005–2006; 2018–present)

During the 1960s, UC Ceares played its matches in the old pitch of Los Fresno, in El Llano neighbourhood of Gijón. This location is today occupied by a shopping mall. During some years, due to not having an own stadium, played its matches in several fields until the current Campo de La Cruz was built in the 1970s.

The pitch is made of natural grass and has dimensions of 99 by 65 meters. The stadium has got a lateral tribune, improved in 2004, with 250 seats. It's located in Parque de Los Pericones in Gijón.

The stadium was used also by Gijón FF, for playing the 2005–06 Superliga Femenina, the only season the club played in the top women's league in Spain. It came back to La Cruz in 2018.

In April 2017, Ceares agreed with the Gijón Town Hall the renovation of the facilities and the construction of a second pitch made of artificial turf for Gijón FF and the youth teams of the club. However, due to some controversies in the city, the Town Hall preferred to build the second pitch in other area of the neighbourhood.

One year later, Ceares authorised Gijón FF to play its games in the women's second division at La Cruz.

In July 2019, the Town Hall of Gijón refused to continue with the project of the new pitch mainly for the women's team and only offered Ceares to renovate La Cruz by building a new tribune and changing the pitch of natural grass for one made of artificial turf. This proposal was widely rejected by the club members.

In 2020, the building of the lockers and club office and the kop, both located behind the goal, were reformed.

== Kit manufacturers and shirt sponsors ==
Period	Kit manufacturer	Shirt sponsors
2003–2004	No provider	Nistal
2004–2008	No provider	Farho
2008–2010	No provider	SEAT Asturias Motor
2010–2011	Luanvi	Cubiastur; Gijón
2011–2012	Huerco	Xixón
2012–2013	Huerco	Fachadas El Llano; Xixón
2013–2016	Mazcatu	Fachadas El Llano; Xixón
2016–2017	Gorbeat	Tierras Gallegas; Xixón
2017–2018	Givova	Tierras Gallegas; Xixón
2018–2021	Adidas	Tierras Gallegas; Xixón
2021–2024	Adidas	Scone; Xixón
2024–	Umbro	Casa Ramón; Xixón

== Season to season ==
Season	Tier	Division	Pos	Pld	W	D	L	GF	GA	Pts	Copa del Rey	Copa Federación	Top league scorer(s)	Goal
1948–49	5	2ª Reg.	2nd	24	14	6	4	72	27	34				
1948–49	5	PG	1st	6	5	0	1	18	7	10				
1949–50	4	1ª Reg.	3rd	20	13	2	5			28				
1950–51	4	1ª Reg.	7th	26	10	6	10	46	41	26				
1951–52	4	1ª Reg.	11th	26	6	5	15	37	66	17				
1952–53	Did not participate as result of a protest													
1953–54	4	1ª Reg.	12th	22	1	3	18	29	79	5				
1954–55	5	2ª Reg.	12th	22	4	1	17	24	62	9				
1955–56	5	2ª Reg.	11th	20	5	4	11	33	44	14				
1956–57	5	2ª Reg.	1st	12	8	1	3	37	16	17				
1956–57	5	PG	8th	14	0	4	10	15	47	4				
1957–58	5	2ª Reg.	6th	16	7	2	7	29	31	16				
1958–59	Did not enter any competition													
1959–60	5	2ª Reg.		24	11	3	10	44	46	25				
1960–61	5	2ª Reg.		26	13	3	10	52	42	29				
1961–62	4	1ª Reg.	14th	26	5	6	15	33	56	16				
1962–63	4	1ª Reg.	9th	28	9	6	13	34	54	24				
1963–64	4	1ª Reg.	14th	30	7	9	14	34	47	23				
1964–65	4	1ª Reg.	2nd	30	18	7	5	64	31	43				
1965–66	3	3ª	16th	30	3	6	21	36	81	12			Toni	7
1966–67	4	1ª Reg.	9th	30	12	3	15	43	52	27				
1967–68	4	1ª Reg.	12th	30	11	5	14	42	54	27				
1968–69	4	1ª Reg.	13th	36	12	6	18	53	66	30				
1969–70	4	1ª Reg.	17th	38	12	5	21	48	83	29				
1970–71	5	2ª Reg.	7th	26	10	6	10	75	62	26				
1971–72	5	2ª Reg.	2nd	22	18	0	4	83	19	36				
1971–72	5	PG	2nd	8	4	2	2	16	8	12				
1972–73	5	2ª Pref.	3rd	26	17	4	5			38				
1973–74	5	2ª Pref.	16th	38	13	6	19	53	69	32				
1974–75	6	2ª Reg.	1st	20	17	1	2			35				
1974–75	6	PG	3rd	8	5	0	3	16	9	10				
1975–76	6	2ª Reg.	1st	16	12	3	1	47	13	27				
1975–76	6	PG	1st	10	5	2	3	14	8	12				
1976–77	5	2ª Pref.	18th	38	7	5	26	45	90	19				
1977–78	6	2ª Pref.	5th	38	19	7	12	63	64	45				
1978–79	6	1ª Reg.	2nd	38	23	10	5	64	27	56				
1979–80	5	Reg. Pref.	18th	38	7	14	17	32	60	28				
1980–81	5	Reg. Pref.	17th	38	13	5	20	59	49	31			Souto	12
1981–82	5	Reg. Pref.	15th	38	15	6	17	48	62	36			Souto	24
1982–83	5	Reg. Pref.	13th	38	13	11	14	58	46	37			Souto	19
1983–84	5	Reg. Pref.	15th	38	11	11	16	57	70	33			Prada Quique	11
1984–85	5	Reg. Pref.	8th	38	17	8	13	71	50	42			Edu	14
1985–86	5	Reg. Pref.	2nd	38	19	11	8	60	38	49			Edu	17
1986–87	4	3ª	19th	38	5	18	15	27	54	28			Edu	7
1986–87	4	RP	W	2	1	0	1	3	2				Edu	7
1987–88	4	3ª	20th	38	2	9	27	30	95	13			Paulino	13
1988–89	5	Reg. Pref.	17th	38	9	10	19	36	70	28			Fredi	12
1989–90	5	Reg. Pref.	15th	38	14	9	15	38	64	37			Elías	7
1990–91	5	Reg. Pref.	6th	38	16	9	13	50	35	41			Fredi	12
1991–92	5	Reg. Pref.	6th	38	16	8	14	43	34	40			Roberto Colunga	10
1992–93	5	Reg. Pref.	14th	38	11	10	17	44	64	32			Roberto Colunga	11
1993–94	5	Reg. Pref.	8th	38	14	11	13	45	45	39			Roberto Colunga	12
1994–95	5	Reg. Pref.	4th	38	21	6	11	58	33	48			Carlos Felipe Vega-Arango	9
1995–96	5	Reg. Pref.	13th	38	13	7	18	39	53	46			Rafa	7
1996–97	5	Reg. Pref.	13th	38	12	10	16	43	50	46			Alfredo Ceñal	7
1997–98	5	Reg. Pref.	8th	38	14	12	12	38	36	54			Línter	8
1998–99	5	Reg. Pref.	11th	38	11	14	13	37	41	47			Línter	9
1999–2000	5	Reg. Pref.	12th	38	12	11	15	39	45	47			Mingotes	12
2000–01	5	Reg. Pref.	18th	38	10	5	23	47	71	35			Carlos	11
2001–02	6	1ª Reg.	1st	38	25	9	4	72	24	84			Aitor	24
2002–03	5	Reg. Pref.	1st	38	26	9	3	80	16	87			Iván Dueñas	14
2003–04	4	3ª	10th	38	13	13	12	41	45	52			Sergio Melón	10
2004–05	4	3ª	11th	38	15	7	16	49	55	52		Group stage	Chris Rodri	8
2005–06	4	3ª	16th	38	10	10	18	35	49	40		Group stage	David Bouzo José María Luengo	6
2006–07	4	3ª	9th	38	12	12	14	48	58	48			José María Luengo	12
2007–08	4	3ª	12th	38	14	8	16	53	55	50		Group stage	Javi Castaño	10
2008–09	4	3ª	15th	38	10	12	16	45	57	42		Semi-finals	Bogdan Stoica	10
2009–10	4	3ª	13th	38	12	8	18	39	59	44			Jimmy	8
2010–11	4	3ª	15th	38	10	9	19	39	56	39			Pelayo Torre	11
2011–12	4	3ª	16th	38	12	4	22	40	62	40			Jimmy	13
2012–13	4	3ª	12th	38	13	9	16	43	48	48			Jorge Vázquez	17
2013–14	4	3ª	3rd	38	21	11	6	54	31	74			Borja Noval	11
2013–14	4	PO	R2	4	1	2	1	4	6				Borja Noval	11
2014–15	4	3ª	6th	38	16	15	7	51	41	63		Group stage	Álvaro Ponte	11
2015–16	4	3ª	10th	38	13	6	19	42	60	45		Group stage	Marcos Iglesias	20
2016–17	4	3ª	9th	38	14	7	17	47	63	49		Group stage	Marcos Iglesias	12
2017–18	4	3ª	6th	38	15	15	8	46	30	60		Group stage	Juan Menéndez	12
2018–19	4	3ª	13th	38	10	14	14	35	51	44		Group stage	Juan Menéndez Wilmer	7
2019–20	4	3ª	15th	28	6	9	13	28	37	27		Group stage	Zucu	9
2020–21	4	3ª	1st	26	16	6	4	38	25	54			Carlos Madeira	12
2021–22	4	2ª RFEF	18th	34	5	3	26	23	78	18	First round		Óscar Fernández	9
2022–23	5	3ª Fed.	12th	30	9	7	14	35	44	34		Group stage	Ferrari David Ferreiro	7
2023–24	5	3ª Fed.	4th	34	19	8	7	52	30	65		Group stage	Carlos Madeira	11
2023–24	5	PO	R1	2	0	0	2	1	4			Group stage	Carlos Madeira	11
2024–25	5	3ª Fed.	12th	34	9	11	14	36	44	38		Semi-finals	Pablo Ferreiro Carlos Madeira Blin Miranda	5
2025–26	5	3ª Fed.	8th	34	12	9	13	39	40	45		Group stage	John Layman	7
2026–27	5	3ª Fed.												

- 1 season in Segunda División RFEF
- 21 seasons in Tercera División
- 5 seasons in Tercera Federación

== Awards and trophies ==
- 1 Tercera División: 2020–21

== Statistics and records ==
=== In Segunda División RFEF ===
Seasons	Pld	W	D	L	GF	GA
1	34	5	3	26	23	78

Updated as of the end of the 2021–22 season.

- Best position: 18th (2021–22).
- Record home win: 2–0 vs Arenteiro.
- Consecutive games undefeated: 2.
- Consecutive games without goals against: 2.
- Top scorer: Óscar Fernández (9 goals).
- Most games played: Héctor Zuazua (33 games).
- Coach with more games: Pablo Busto (34 games).

=== In Tercera División/Tercera Federación ===
Seasons	Pld	W	D	L	GF	GA
23	830	267	221	342	949	1186

Updated as of the end of the 2023–24 season.

- Best position: 1st (2020–21).
- Consecutive season in Tercera División: 17th (2003–04 to 2019–20).
- Record home win: 6–0 vs Condal (2017–18).
- Record away win: 0–4 vs Llanes (2012–13) and vs Barcia (2023–24), 1–5 vs Siero (2019–20) and vs Gijón Industrial (2023–24).
- Consecutive games undefeated: 13 (2020–21).
- Consecutive wins: 7 (2020–21).
- Consecutive games without goals against: 5 (2009–10 and 2020–21).
- Top scorer: Jimmy (47 goals).
- Most games played: Juan Carlos (295 games, including playoffs).
- Coach with more games: Nacho Cabo (156 games, including playoffs).

=== Most capped players ===
Below is a list of the ten players with the most caps for Ceares in national leagues, Copa del Rey and Copa RFEF, as of the end of the 2022–23 season. Players in bold are currently playing at Ceares.

#	Player	Period	Caps	Goals
1	Juan Carlos	2011–2023	362	37
2	Pablo Martínez	2013–2020	236	20
3	Fonso Bellón	2012–2019	234	7
4	Jimmy	2009–2016	228	48
5	Chery	2014–2020	221	3
6	Pablo Prendes	2003–2006; 2007–2009; 2014–2015	203	10
7	David Bermejo	2003–2009	176	1
8	Chelís	2003–2009	172	4
9	Mario de la Roca	2003–2007; 2011–2012	161	6
10	Aitor Cañedo	2013–2018; 2020–2023	160	6

=== Top goalscorers ===
Below is a list of the top ten goalscorers for Ceares in national leagues, Copa del Rey and Copa RFEF, as of the 2021–22 season. Players in bold are currently playing at Ceares.

#	Player	Period	Goals	Caps	Average
1	Jimmy	2009–2016	48	228	0.21
2	Juan Carlos	2011–2023	37	362	0.10
3	Marcos Iglesias	2015–2017	34	68	0.50
4	Francisco Castaño	2006–2009	30	112	0.27
5	Álvaro Ponte	2013–2016	25	97	0.26
6	José María Luengo	2005–2007; 2011–2012	23	104	0.22
7	**Carlos Madeira**	2017–2018; 2020–	23	97	0.24
8	Juan Menéndez	2017–2019	20	78	0.26
8	Pablo Martínez	2013–2020	20	236	0.08
9	Jorge Vázquez	2010–2011; 2012–2013	18	58	0.31
9	Borja Noval	2011–2014	18	93	0.19
9	Dani Peláez	2005–2007; 2016–2017	18	106	0.17

== Famous players ==
- (Spain) Salvador Capín
- (Spain) Francisco Javier Castaño
- (Spain) Adrián Colunga
- (Spain) Dani Peláez
- (Spain) Josu Uribe
- (Dominican Republic) Bryan Jiménez

== Head coaches ==
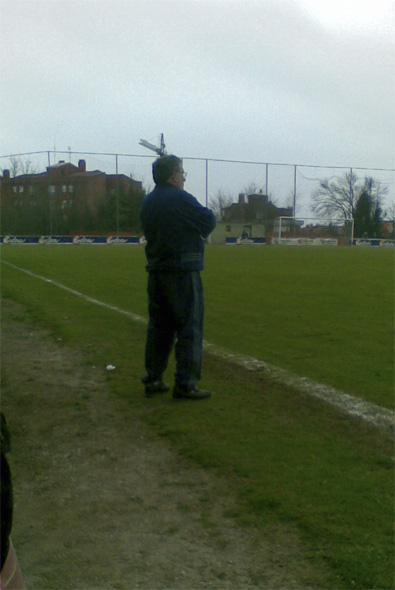
Rogelio García, one of the most prolific coaches in the club's history

Updated as of 11 January 2025. All official games are counted.

Name	First match date	Last match date	Pld	W	D	L	PCT
Tibor Budavari	4 September 1977	28 May 1978	38	9	10	19	.237
El Playu	2 September 1978	1 June 1980	76	30	23	23	.395
Pepín	7 September 1980	26 May 1984	152	51	40	61	.336
José Luis Rodríguez	2 September 1984	18 May 1985	38	17	8	13	.447
Nardo	1 September 1985	21 June 1987	78	26	29	23	.333
Eugenio Méndez	29 August 1987	10 January 1988	19	1	4	14	.053
Amaro	17 January 1988	24 January 1988	2	0	1	1	.000
Armando Sanz	31 January 1988	22 May 1988	17	1	4	12	.059
César Fernández	4 September 1988	8 October 1989	44	9	11	24	.205
Aníbal López	15 October 1989	27 May 1990	32	11	8	13	.344
Serafín Menéndez	1 September 1991	1 September 1991	1	0	0	1	.000
Angelín	8 September 1991	10 January 1993	56	20	14	22	.435
José Manuel Glez. Quintanal	17 January 1993	8 December 1996	148	59	33	56	.399
Nicolás Jiménez Mármol	31 August 1997	30 May 1999	40	11	6	23	.275
Graciano Fano (2 times)	15 December 1996	16 January 2000	37	7	13	17	.189
José Ramón Trapero	22 January 2000	4 February 2001	40	11	6	23	.275
Javier González	11 February 2001	27 May 2002	32	23	8	1	.719
Brasi (2 times)	12 April 1997	14 April 2002	38	27	8	3	.711
Berrocal	21 April 2002	26 May 2002	6	2	1	3	.333
José Antonio Redondo	5 August 2007	12 January 2008	24	9	2	13	.375
Rogelio García (2 times)	1 September 2002	17 May 2009	260	95	76	89	.365
Florentino Angulo (2 times)	2 September 1990	13 May 2012	152	50	30	72	.329
Miguelín	30 July 2014	3 October 2015	51	23	15	13	.451
Iñaki Eraña	11 October 2015	15 May 2016	31	8	6	17	.258
Tino del Corzo	31 July 2016	14 May 2017	42	14	8	20	.333
Nacho Cabo (2 times)	26 August 2012	19 May 2019	164	62	51	51	.378
Alberto Menéndez	31 July 2019	7 March 2020	32	7	11	14	.219
Pablo Busto	15 November 2020	15 May 2022	61	21	9	31	.344
Julio Llanos	10 August 2022	23 April 2023	34	9	7	18	.265
Jorge Menéndez	6 August 2023		61	25	15	21	.410

== Memorial Pepe Ortiz ==
Since 2011, UC Ceares starts the pre-season playing a friendly trophy called Memorial Pepe Ortiz in hommage of the former player of Sporting de Gijón from 1949 to 1963, considered as the best player of the history of the neighbourhood.

Year	Winner	Runner-up	Score
2011 (Note: Four teams played the first edition. Racing La Guía finished third and Manuel Rubio fourth.)	Roces	Ceares	1–0
2012	Sporting B	Ceares	2–0
2013	Avilés	Ceares	2–1
2014	Sporting B	Ceares	2–0
2015	Ceares	La Bañeza	2–1
2016	Atlético Pinto	Ceares	2–1
2017	Ceares	Gijón Industrial	2–1
2018	Ceares	Candás	3–2
2019	Langreo	Ceares	2–0
2020	Ceares	Candás	2–0
2021	Ceares	Gijón Industrial	1–1 (5–3 p)
2022	UD Ourense	Ceares	1–0
2023	Ceares	Covadonga	1–0
2025	Langreo	Ceares	1–0

== Agreed and affiliated teams ==
=== Gijón FF ===
Gijón Fútbol Femenino is the only women's football team of Gijón that played in the Superliga.

In 2015, Gijón FF started to act as de facto's women's section of Ceares and both created the Mixed Football Academy.

=== Veriña ===
Veriña Club de Fútbol, located in the namesake parish, is one of the most important youth football teams in the city. The collaboration agreement started in 2020, during the months Ceares had to play at Estadio Lloreda due to the improvement works at La Cruz.
