= Bryan Jiménez =

Dominican footballer

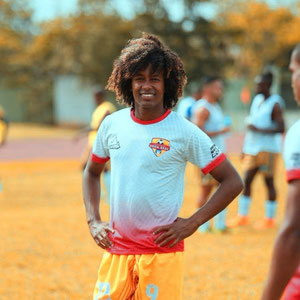

Personal information
- Full name: Bryan Jiménez González
- Date of birth: 22 January 1994 (age 32)
- Place of birth: Santo Domingo, Dominican Republic
- Height: 1.75 m (5 ft 9 in)
- Positions: Winger; forward

Team information
- Current team: Avilés Stadium
- Number: 10

Youth career
- Grisú
- Los Arcos
- 2012–2013: Romanón

Senior career*
Years	Team	Apps	(Gls)
2013–2014	Siero	35	(7)
2014–2015	Ceares	29	(2)
2015	Atlético Lugones	8	(0)
2016	Atlántico	?	(1)
2017	Moca		
2018–2020	Atlético Vega Real		
2020–2021	Mosconia		
2021	Džiugas	9	(0)
2021–2023	Colloto	47	(15)
2023–	Avilés Stadium	66	(18)

International career^{‡}
2014–	Dominican Republic	5	(0)
- * Club domestic league appearances and goals as of 20:34, 22 June 2025 (UTC) ‡ National team caps and goals as of 30 August 2016

Bryan Jiménez González (born 22 January 1994) is a Dominican footballer who plays for Spanish club Avilés Stadium and the Dominican Republic national team as a right winger or forward. He also holds Spanish citizenship.

== Club career ==
Born in Santo Domingo, Jiménez only started his youth career in 2006, aged 12, and played for Spanish lower sides Grisú CF and CD Los Arcos before joining CD Romanón in the 2012 summer. He scored 25 goals for the latter, and made his senior debuts for Club Siero in the 2013–14 campaign, in the regional leagues.

On 19 July 2014 Jiménez moved to UC Ceares, in Tercera División. After being called up to the national side, he became the club's first international footballer of their 68-year history.

In June 2021 he left FC Džiugas. In A lyga he played in 9 matches and made two assists. And played one match for Džiugas B team in Second League. He got yellow card in 34 minute and was changed in 63 minute.

== International career ==
Jiménez made his international debut for Dominican Republic on 30 August 2014, coming on as a 77th-minute substitute in a 0–2 friendly loss against El Salvador.
