= José Antonio Redondo (footballer) =

Spanish footballer and manager

Personal information
- Full name: José Antonio Redondo García
- Date of birth: 8 March 1953 (age 73)
- Place of birth: Turón, Spain
- Position: Defender

Youth career
- Turón

Senior career*
Years	Team	Apps	(Gls)
1971–1972	Turón		
1973–1985	Sporting Gijón	278	(3)
1972–1973	→ Ensidesa (loan)		

International career
1980	Spain B	1	(0)

Managerial career
- 1988–1989: Gijón Industrial
- 1989–1990: Sporting B
- 1998: Sporting Gijón
- 1998: Sporting B
- 1998: Sporting Gijón
- 2002–2005: San Martín
- 2007: Berrón
- 2007–2008: Ceares
- 2009: Valdesoto
- 2011–2014: L'Entregu
- 2014–2015: Langreo
- * Club domestic league appearances and goals

José Antonio Redondo García (born 8 March 1953) is a retired footballer who played as a defender, and a current manager.

== Club career ==
Born in Turón, Mieres, Asturias, Redondo graduated from CD Turón's youth setup, making his senior debuts in the 1971–72 campaign. In the 1972 summer he moved to Sporting de Gijón, being immediately loaned to CD Ensidesa in a six-month deal.

Redondo returned to the Asturian side in 1973 and made his La Liga debut on 7 January, starting in a 0–1 away loss against Real Oviedo. He appeared in 14 matches during the season, with his side narrowly avoided relegation.

After appearing rarely in 1973–74, Redondo featured regularly in the following campaigns, retiring in 1985, aged 31. He was also the club's captain for seven seasons.

== Manager career ==
Redondo began his managerial career at lowly UD Gijón Industrial in 1988, after managing Sporting's youth setup. In 1989, he was appointed the latter's reserve team manager, and remained in charge for one season. He eventually returned to the Rojiblancos in 1997, being appointed assistant manager.

In April 1998, Redondo was appointed caretaker manager, replacing José Manuel Díaz Novoa, as his side were already relegated. He returned to the B-team for the 1998–99 campaign, but was again promoted in October, after Antonio López's resignation.

Redondo returned to the bench only in 2002, at the helm of lowly CD San Martín. He resumed his managerial career in the lower leagues, managing Berrón CF, UC Ceares, Valdesoto CF, L'Entregu CF and UP Langreo; he resigned from the latter on 11 March 2015.
