= Francisco Castaño =

Spanish footballer

Personal information
- Full name: Francisco Javier Castaño Allende
- Date of birth: 29 December 1972 (age 53)
- Place of birth: Gijón, Spain
- Height: 1.76 m (5 ft 9 in)
- Position: Midfielder

Youth career
- Sporting Gijón

Senior career*
Years	Team	Apps	(Gls)
1990–1993	Sporting Gijón B	59	(3)
1991–1995	Sporting Gijón	54	(1)
1995–1998	Logroñés	96	(12)
1998–2000	Numancia	72	(17)
2000–2002	Betis	28	(0)
2002–2003	Levante	21	(0)
2003–2004	Astur	18	(2)
2004–2006	Langreo	57	(7)
2006–2009	Ceares	102	(30)
2009–2013	Marino Luanco	143	(10)
2013–2014	Lealtad	32	(0)
Total		682	(82)

International career
1989	Spain U16	9	(1)
1993	Spain U21	1	(0)

Managerial career
- 2024–2025: Candás
- * Club domestic league appearances and goals

Francisco Javier Castaño Allende (born 29 December 1972) is a Spanish former professional footballer who played as a midfielder.

He amassed La Liga totals of 121 games and seven goals over six seasons, representing in the competition Sporting de Gijón, Logroñés, Numancia and Betis. He added 150 matches and 23 goals in the Segunda División, where he appeared for all the clubs but the first.

== Club career ==
Born in Gijón, Asturias, Castaño alternated between La Liga and Segunda División during his first 13 years as a senior. He made his debut in the former competition on 2 June 1991 with Sporting de Gijón, coming on as a 68th minute substitute in a 3–0 home win against RCD Español. He scored his first goal in the Spanish top flight on 27 March 1994, contributing to a 2–1 victory over RC Celta de Vigo also at El Molinón.

Castaño promoted to the top tier three times in his professional career, with CD Logroñés in 1996, CD Numancia in 1999 and Real Betis in 2001, totalling 17 goals in the process. He also suffered relegation with the second side in 1997.

In 2003, aged 30, Castaño left Levante UD. He went on to play a further 11 seasons in his native region, with Astur CF, UP Langreo, UC Ceares, Marino de Luanco and CD Lealtad, competing in the Segunda División B and the Tercera División.

In July 2015, Castaño returned to Sporting de Gijón as youth coach. Six years later, he was appointed manager of Tercera Federación club CD Mosconia.
