= José Antonio Redondo =

José Antonio Redondo may refer to:

- José Antonio Redondo (cyclist) (born 1985), Spanish cyclist
- José Antonio Redondo (footballer) (born 1953), Spanish footballer
