= CF Gandía =

Spanish football club

Gandía
- Full name: Club de Fútbol Gandía
- Founded: 1947
- Ground: Guillermo Olagüe, Gandia, Valencia, Spain
- Capacity: 6,000
- President: Jesús Sendra
- Head coach: Vicente Martí
- League: Primera FFCV – Group 3
- 2024–25: Lliga Comunitat – South, 16th of 16 (relegated)
- Website: http://www.cfgandia.es/
Home colours	Away colours

Club de Fútbol Gandía is a Spanish football team based in Gandia, in the autonomous community of Valencia. Founded in 1947 it plays in Primera FFCV – Group 3, holding home matches at Estadio Guillermo Olagüe, with a capacity of 6,000 seats.

== Season to season ==
Season	Tier	Division	Place	Copa del Rey
1947–48	5	2ª Reg.	3rd	
1948–49	5	2ª Reg.	1st	
1949–50	5	2ª Reg.		
1950–51	5	2ª Reg.		
1951–52	5	2ª Reg.	1st	
1952–53	4	1ª Reg.	1st	
1953–54	3	3ª	6th	
1954–55	3	3ª	4th	
1955–56	3	3ª	3rd	
1956–57	3	3ª	2nd	
1957–58	3	3ª	3rd	
1958–59	3	3ª	4th	
1959–60	3	3ª	3rd	
1960–61	3	3ª	5th	
1961–62	3	3ª	1st	
1962–63	3	3ª	5th	
1963–64	3	3ª	6th	
1964–65	3	3ª	2nd	
1965–66	3	3ª	3rd	
1966–67	3	3ª	3rd	

Season	Tier	Division	Place	Copa del Rey
1967–68	3	3ª	2nd	
1968–69	3	3ª	4th	
1969–70	3	3ª	2nd	
1970–71	3	3ª	8th	
1971–72	3	3ª	20th	
1972–73	4	Reg. Pref.	2nd	
1973–74	3	3ª	17th	
1974–75	4	Reg. Pref.	1st	
1975–76	3	3ª	8th	
1976–77	3	3ª	18th	
1977–78	4	3ª	7th	
1978–79	4	3ª	3rd	Second round
1979–80	4	3ª	7th	First round
1980–81	4	3ª	6th	First round
1981–82	4	3ª	6th	First round
1982–83	4	3ª	3rd	Second round
1983–84	4	3ª	5th	Second round
1984–85	4	3ª	5th	First round
1985–86	4	3ª	2nd	First round
1986–87	3	2ª B	16th	Second round

Season	Tier	Division	Place	Copa del Rey
1987–88	3	2ª B	8th	Third round
1988–89	3	2ª B	11th	Second round
1989–90	3	2ª B	3rd	
1990–91	3	2ª B	9th	Third round
1991–92	3	2ª B	16th	Third round
1992–93	4	3ª	7th	First round
1993–94	4	3ª	17th	
1994–95	4	3ª	1st	
1995–96	4	3ª	3rd	
1996–97	3	2ª B	15th	First round
1997–98	3	2ª B	9th	
1998–99	3	2ª B	11th	
1999–2000	3	2ª B	1st	
2000–01	3	2ª B	19th	Second round
2001–02	4	3ª	12th	
2002–03	4	3ª	10th	
2003–04	4	3ª	16th	
2004–05	4	3ª	2nd	
2005–06	4	3ª	20th	First round
2006–07	5	Reg. Pref.	4th	

Season	Tier	Division	Place	Copa del Rey
2007–08	5	Reg. Pref.	3rd	
2008–09	4	3ª	5th	
2009–10	4	3ª	1st	
2010–11	3	2ª B	14th	First round
2011–12	3	2ª B	18th	
2012–13	4	3ª	15th	
2013–14	5	Reg. Pref.	17th	
2014–15	6	1ª Reg.	13th	
2015–16	6	1ª Reg.	16th	
2016–17	7	2ª Reg.	4th	
2017–18	7	2ª Reg.	4th	
2018–19	7	2ª Reg.	1st	
2019–20	6	1ª Reg.	1st	
2020–21	5	Reg. Pref.	4th	
2021–22	6	Reg. Pref.	1st	
2022–23	5	3ª Fed.	6th	
2023–24	5	3ª Fed.	7th	
2024–25	6	Lliga Com.	16th	
2025–26	7	1ª FFCV	1st	
2026–27	6	Lliga Com.		

- 13 seasons in Segunda División B
- 43 seasons in Tercera División
- 2 seasons in Tercera Federación

== Notable players ==
Note: this list includes players that have played at least 100 league games and/or have reached international status.

- (Spain) Juan Aguilar
- (Spain) José Albelda
- (Spain) Vicente Ausiàs
- (Spain) Raúl Bravo
- (Spain) Franco Borràs
- (Spain) Ignacio Catalá
- (Spain) Juan Espín
- (Spain) Diego Jiménez
- (Spain) Julián
- (Spain) Francisco Lorente
- (Spain) Marcos
- (Spain) Domingo Pomar
- (Spain) Carlos Santandreu
