= 1979–80 Tercera División =

Tercera División
- Season: 1979–80

The 1979–80 Tercera División season is the 3rd season since establishment as the fourth tier.

== Group 1 ==
Pos	Team	Pld	W	D	L	GF	GA	GD	Pts	Promotion or relegation
1	Compostela	38	26	4	8	62	27	+35	56	Promotion to the Segunda División B
2	Avilés	38	21	11	6	62	28	+34	53	
3	Caudal	38	19	10	9	61	35	+26	48	
4	Ponferradina	38	19	10	9	64	34	+30	48	
5	Alondras	38	14	13	11	56	40	+16	41	
6	Cambados	38	15	10	13	45	36	+9	40	
7	Lugo	38	13	13	12	51	46	+5	39	
8	Arosa	38	13	12	13	60	53	+7	38	
9	Oviedo Af.	38	13	12	13	44	45	−1	38	
10	Turón	38	13	11	14	32	42	−10	37	
11	Noya	38	13	10	15	36	53	−17	36	
12	Turista	38	14	7	17	52	58	−6	35	
13	Siero	38	12	11	15	45	50	−5	35	
14	At. Riveira	38	10	14	14	35	45	−10	34	
15	Cacabelense	38	14	6	18	54	69	−15	34	
16	Fabril	38	9	16	13	47	56	−9	34	
17	Gijón Ind.	38	12	8	18	49	55	−6	32	
18	Gran Peña	38	10	10	18	32	49	−17	30	
19	Entrego	38	10	9	19	36	59	−23	29	
20	San Martín	38	9	5	24	33	76	−43	23	Relegation playoff

== Group 2 ==
Pos	Team	Pld	W	D	L	GF	GA	GD	Pts	Promotion or relegation
1	Gim. Arandina	38	17	14	7	48	27	+21	48	Promotion to the Segunda División B
2	Salmantino	38	19	9	10	48	32	+16	47	
3	Valladolid Pr.	38	20	6	12	65	41	+24	46	
4	Castro	38	19	6	13	51	49	+2	44	
5	Calahorra	38	16	11	11	55	47	+8	43	
6	Peña Sport	38	14	14	10	49	41	+8	42	
7	Venta de Baños	38	15	10	13	50	45	+5	40	
8	Béjar Ind.	38	16	7	15	46	46	0	39	
9	Sangüesa	38	17	5	16	58	59	−1	39	
10	Rayo Cantabria	38	13	12	13	44	48	−4	38	
11	Cayón	38	17	4	17	48	47	+1	38	
12	Tudelano	38	15	8	15	43	42	+1	38	
13	Santoña	38	13	10	15	39	47	−8	36	
14	Naval	38	11	13	14	48	47	+1	35	
15	Haro	38	12	11	15	42	55	−13	35	
16	Corellano	38	12	9	17	38	46	−8	33	
17	Burgos Prom.	38	12	9	17	43	56	−13	33	
18	Benavente	38	9	11	18	32	55	−23	29	
19	Chantrea	38	10	9	19	49	55	−6	29	
20	Gim. Torrelavega	38	11	6	21	42	53	−11	28	Relegation playoff

== Group 3 ==
Pos	Team	Pld	W	D	L	GF	GA	GD	Pts	Promotion or relegation
1	San Sebastián	38	24	7	7	76	26	+50	55	Promotion to the Segunda División B
2	Dep. Alavés Af.	38	19	13	6	57	32	+25	51	
3	Aragón	38	21	9	8	58	41	+17	51	
4	Eibar	38	21	7	10	84	38	+46	49	
5	Sabiñánigo	38	18	7	13	59	48	+11	43	
6	Erandio	38	15	12	11	48	39	+9	42	
7	Valmaseda	38	16	9	13	54	52	+2	41	
8	Talavera	38	16	7	15	61	49	+12	39	
9	Toledo	38	14	11	13	48	46	+2	39	
10	Guernica	38	12	13	13	44	49	−5	37	
11	Aurrerá Ond.	38	11	14	13	46	40	+6	36	
12	Lagún Onak	38	13	8	17	40	52	−12	34	
13	Motrico	38	14	6	18	40	56	−16	34	
14	Real Unión	38	11	12	15	46	57	−11	34	
15	Munguía	38	11	11	16	38	43	−5	33	
16	Deusto	38	10	12	16	41	57	−16	32	
17	Tolosa	38	9	11	18	41	61	−20	29	
18	Elorrio	38	11	6	21	51	76	−25	28	
19	Ejea	38	9	9	20	44	79	−35	27	
20	Lemona	38	8	10	20	33	68	−35	26	Relegation playoff

== Group 4 ==
Pos	Team	Pld	W	D	L	GF	GA	GD	Pts	Promotion or relegation
1	Andorra	38	22	9	7	69	31	+38	53	Promotion to the Segunda División B
2	Reus	38	21	10	7	68	28	+40	52	
3	Figueras	38	20	9	9	89	45	+44	49	
4	Endesa Andorra	38	19	9	10	72	48	+24	47	
5	Barcelona Af.	38	17	11	10	63	60	+3	45	
6	Vinaroz	38	17	10	11	63	47	+16	44	
7	Igualada	38	17	10	11	54	46	+8	44	
8	Júpiter	38	17	9	12	72	49	+23	43	
9	Binéfar	38	19	4	15	64	57	+7	42	
10	Gramanet	38	15	10	13	52	57	−5	40	
11	Badalona	38	16	8	14	42	41	+1	40	
12	Monzón	38	13	7	18	52	65	−13	33	
13	Vilafranca	38	10	11	17	50	66	−16	31	
14	Olot	38	12	6	20	56	57	−1	30	
15	Gavà	38	11	8	19	55	76	−21	30	
16	Europa	38	10	10	18	50	73	−23	30	
17	La Cava	38	11	7	20	49	69	−20	29	
18	Masnou	38	11	6	21	47	76	−29	28	
19	Malgrat	38	10	6	22	47	83	−36	26	
20	Horta	38	8	8	22	47	87	−40	24	Relegation playoff

== Group 5 ==
Pos	Team	Pld	W	D	L	GF	GA	GD	Pts	Promotion or relegation
1	Alcalá	38	20	12	6	60	34	+26	52	Promotion to the Segunda División B
2	Moscardó	38	22	7	9	68	33	+35	51	
3	Alcorcón	38	19	10	9	69	52	+17	48	
4	Manchego	38	18	11	9	47	28	+19	47	
5	Cacereño	38	15	11	12	61	41	+20	41	
6	Pegaso	38	16	9	13	64	56	+8	41	
7	San Fernando	38	14	12	12	65	56	+9	40	
8	Villanovense	38	12	16	10	41	45	−4	40	
9	Ciempozuelos	38	15	8	15	61	56	+5	38	
10	Valdepeñas	38	14	9	15	52	58	−6	37	
11	Leganés	38	13	11	14	52	50	+2	37	
12	Don Benito	38	15	5	18	58	65	−7	35	
13	Plasencia	38	13	9	16	50	56	−6	35	
14	Numancia	38	12	10	16	45	51	−6	34	
15	San Andrés	38	12	10	16	46	53	−7	34	
16	Tenisca	38	14	6	18	46	71	−25	34	
17	Carabanchel	38	14	5	19	39	54	−15	33	
18	Valdemoro	38	12	9	17	50	59	−9	33	
19	Arganda	38	9	7	22	44	63	−19	25	
20	Toscal	38	7	11	20	33	70	−37	25	Relegation playoff

== Group 6 ==
Pos	Team	Pld	W	D	L	GF	GA	GD	Pts	Promotion or relegation
1	Cartagena	38	24	9	5	75	32	+43	57	Promotion to the Segunda División B
2	Albacete	38	21	13	4	55	23	+32	55	
3	Orihuela	38	19	10	9	63	42	+21	48	
4	Acero	38	15	11	12	43	43	0	41	
5	Mestalla	38	17	7	14	54	46	+8	41	
6	Carcagente	38	15	11	12	48	34	+14	41	
7	Gandía	38	13	13	12	45	29	+16	39	
8	Crevillente	38	13	13	12	29	36	−7	39	
9	Villarreal	38	14	11	13	50	41	+9	39	
10	Alcoyano	38	10	18	10	41	38	+3	38	
11	Villena	38	15	8	15	52	52	0	38	
12	Almansa	38	13	11	14	46	52	−6	37	
13	Cuart	38	15	6	17	45	54	−9	36	
14	Alicante	38	15	6	17	55	53	+2	36	
15	Torrevieja	38	10	14	14	52	57	−5	34	
16	Olímpico	38	11	11	16	39	47	−8	33	
17	Lorca	38	13	7	18	39	56	−17	33	
18	Español SVR	38	11	9	18	33	58	−25	31	
19	Alcira	38	8	9	21	36	65	−29	25	
20	Paterna	38	7	5	26	41	83	−42	19	Relegation playoff

== Group 7 ==
Pos	Team	Pld	W	D	L	GF	GA	GD	Pts	Promotion or relegation
1	Mérida Ind.	38	22	12	4	63	27	+36	56	Promotion to the Segunda División B
2	Linense	38	19	8	11	56	33	+23	46	
3	Úbeda	38	17	12	9	49	40	+9	46	
4	Rota	38	15	15	8	44	29	+15	45	
5	San Pedro	38	19	5	14	47	40	+7	43	
6	Motril	38	17	8	13	44	38	+6	42	
7	Estepona	38	16	9	13	41	42	−1	41	
8	Martos	38	16	8	14	40	41	−1	40	
9	Betis Dep.	38	15	10	13	52	43	+9	40	
10	G. Melilla	38	16	7	15	49	45	+4	39	
11	At. Malagueño	38	14	10	14	41	34	+7	38	
12	Vélez	38	14	10	14	43	49	−6	38	
13	Extremadura	38	14	8	16	43	47	−4	36	
14	Llerenense	38	12	12	14	40	47	−7	36	
15	Antequerano	38	13	8	17	45	48	−3	34	
16	Puerto Real	38	12	10	16	44	51	−7	34	
17	África Ceutí	38	12	7	19	44	65	−21	31	
18	Carolinense	38	11	8	19	36	45	−9	30	
19	Jerez Ind.	38	7	12	19	26	51	−25	26	
20	Ind. Melilla	38	4	11	23	26	58	−32	19	Relegation playoff

== Group 8 ==
Pos	Team	Pld	W	D	L	GF	GA	GD	Pts	Promotion or relegation
1	Mallorca	38	31	3	4	80	21	+59	65	Promotion to the Segunda División B
2	Poblense	38	27	9	2	101	18	+83	63	
3	Margaritense	38	17	14	7	53	41	+12	48	
4	Constancia	38	19	8	11	56	38	+18	46	
5	Sp. Mahonés	38	19	7	12	58	40	+18	45	
6	Murense	38	16	11	11	66	53	+13	43	
7	Portmany	38	16	10	12	68	60	+8	42	
8	Felanitx	38	15	9	14	46	47	−1	39	
9	Binisalem	38	16	6	16	67	56	+11	38	
10	Andraitx	38	12	11	15	40	61	−21	35	
11	At. Ciudadela	38	14	6	18	58	58	0	34	
12	España	38	13	8	17	51	65	−14	34	
13	At. Baleares	38	12	9	17	57	61	−4	33	
14	Sóller	38	10	12	16	40	59	−19	32	
15	Collerense	38	12	7	19	46	53	−7	31	
16	Ses Salines	38	11	8	19	56	75	−19	30	
17	Porreras	38	10	10	18	48	60	−12	30	
18	Alayor	38	9	10	19	34	63	−29	28	
19	Formentera	38	7	8	23	23	69	−46	22	Relegation to Regional
20	Ibiza At.	38	8	6	24	35	85	−50	22	Relegation to Regional

== Playoffs ==
=== Tercera División promotion/relegation playoff ===
pen.)

Team 1	Agg.	Team 2	1st leg	2nd leg
Europa Nava	5-2	San Martín	3-2	2-0
Gim. Torrelavega	2-4	Unión Club Astillero	1-0	1-4
Paterna	2-1	Benidorm	2-0	0-1
Horta	5-5	Vich	3-1	2-4 (??
Toscal	3-2	Gara	3-0	0-2
Lemona	2-1	Amorebieta	2-0	0-1

Team 1	Score	Team 2
Ind. Melilla	3 - 0	Gim. Cabrerizas

- Promotion to Tercera: Europa Nava & Unión Club Astillero
- Permanence in Tercera: Paterna, Horta, Toscal, Lemona & Ind. Melilla

=== Tercera División Relegation playoff ===
Team 1	Agg.	Team 2	1st leg	2nd leg
San Martín	2-1	Gim. Torrelavega	2-0	0-1

- Permanence in Tercera: San Martín Sotr.
- Relegation to Regional: Gim. Torrelavega
