= Atlètic de Ciutadella =

Atlètic Ciutadella
- Full name: Atlètic de Ciutadella
- Founded: 1956
- Dissolved: 2024
- Ground: Sant Antoni, Ciutadella, Spain
- Capacity: 5,000
- 2023–24: Regional Preferente – Menorca, 11th of 11
| Home colours | Away colours |

Atlètic de Ciutadella was a football team based in Ciutadella, Illes Balears. Founded in 1956 and dissolved in 2024, the club last played in Regional Preferente – Menorca. The club's home ground is Estadio Sant Antoni.

== History ==
The club was established in 1956 through a merger of CD Ciudadela and CD Minerva Ciudadela. The team did not play in any category from 2010 to 2012, returning to football activity for 2012–13 season.

In April 2024, Atlètic Ciutadella merged with UE Sami and Dosa CF to create Ciutadella CE.

=== Club background ===
- Club Deportivo Atlético de Ciudadela (1956–1983)
- Atlético de Ciudadela Club de Fútbol (1983–1994)
- Atlètic de Ciutadella Club de Fútbol (1994–2010)
- Atlètic de Ciutadella (2012–2024)

== Season to season ==
| Season | Tier | Division | Place | Copa del Rey |
|---|---|---|---|---|
| 1956–57 | 3 | 3ª | 10th | |
| 1957–58 | 3 | 3ª | 5th | |
| 1958–59 | 3 | 3ª | 5th | |
| 1959–60 | 3 | 3ª | 3rd | |
| 1960–61 | 3 | 3ª | 10th | |
| 1961–62 | 3 | 3ª | 2nd | |
| 1962–63 | 3 | 3ª | 2nd | |
| 1963–64 | 3 | 3ª | 5th | |
| 1964–65 | 3 | 3ª | 4th | |
| 1965–66 | 3 | 3ª | 8th | |
| 1966–67 | 3 | 3ª | 8th | |
| 1967–68 | 3 | 3ª | 11th | |
| 1968–69 | 4 | 1ª Reg. | 1st | |
| 1969–70 | 3 | 3ª | 12th | |
| 1970–71 | 4 | 1ª Reg. | 1st | |
| 1971–72 | 3 | 3ª | 11th | First round |
| 1972–73 | 3 | 3ª | 13th | Third round |
| 1973–74 | 3 | 3ª | 8th | First round |
| 1974–75 | 3 | 3ª | 18th | First round |
| 1975–76 | 4 | Reg. Pref. | 2nd | |

| Season | Tier | Division | Place | Copa del Rey |
|---|---|---|---|---|
| 1976–77 | 4 | Reg. Pref. | 2nd | |
| 1977–78 | 5 | Reg. Pref. | | |
| 1978–79 | 5 | Reg. Pref. | | |
| 1979–80 | 4 | 3ª | 11th | Third round |
| 1980–81 | 4 | 3ª | 3rd | |
| 1981–82 | 4 | 3ª | 6th | Second round |
| 1982–83 | 4 | 3ª | 19th | Second round |
| 1983–84 | 5 | Reg. Pref. | 1st | |
| 1984–85 | 4 | 3ª | 13th | |
| 1985–86 | 4 | 3ª | 18th | |
| 1986–87 | 5 | Reg. Pref. | | |
| 1987–88 | 5 | Reg. Pref. | | |
| 1988–89 | 5 | Reg. Pref. | | |
| 1989–90 | 5 | Reg. Pref. | | |
| 1990–91 | 5 | Reg. Pref. | | |
| 1991–92 | 5 | Reg. Pref. | | |
| 1992–93 | 4 | 3ª | 14th | |
| 1993–94 | 4 | 3ª | 14th | |
| 1994–95 | 4 | 3ª | 16th | |
| 1995–96 | 4 | 3ª | 8th | |

| Season | Tier | Division | Place | Copa del Rey |
|---|---|---|---|---|
| 1996–97 | 4 | 3ª | 12th | |
| 1997–98 | 4 | 3ª | 14th | |
| 1998–99 | 4 | 3ª | 14th | |
| 1999–2000 | 4 | 3ª | 17th | |
| 2000–01 | 4 | 3ª | 18th | |
| 2001–02 | 5 | Reg. Pref. | 5th | |
| 2002–03 | 5 | Reg. Pref. | 1st | |
| 2003–04 | 5 | Reg. Pref. | 1st | |
| 2004–05 | 4 | 3ª | 11th | |
| 2005–06 | 4 | 3ª | 7th | |
| 2006–07 | 4 | 3ª | 12th | |
| 2007–08 | 4 | 3ª | 11th | |
| 2008–09 | 4 | 3ª | 14th | |
| 2009–10 | 4 | 3ª | 20th | |

| Season | Tier | Division | Place | Copa del Rey |
|---|---|---|---|---|
| 2010–11 | DNP | | | |
| 2011–12 | DNP | | | |
| 2012–13 | 5 | Reg. Pref. | 6th | |
| 2013–14 | 5 | Reg. Pref. | 4th | |
| 2014–15 | 5 | Reg. Pref. | 5th | |
| 2015–16 | 5 | Reg. Pref. | 7th | |
| 2016–17 | 5 | Reg. Pref. | 6th | |
| 2017–18 | 5 | Reg. Pref. | 8th | |
| 2018–19 | 5 | Reg. Pref. | 9th | |
| 2019–20 | 5 | Reg. Pref. | 11th | |
| 2020–21 | 5 | Reg. Pref. | 12th | |
| 2021–22 | 6 | Reg. Pref. | 8th | |
| 2022–23 | 6 | Reg. Pref. | 11th | |
| 2023–24 | 6 | Reg. Pref. | 11th | |

- 38 seasons in Tercera División

== Former players ==
- (Argentina) Martín Prest
- (Brazil) Diego Balbinot
