= CD Turón =

Spanish football team

- Full name: Club Deportivo Turón
- Founded: 1925
- Ground: Estadio José Manuel Fernández Felgueroso, Turón, Asturias, Spain
- Capacity: 2,000
- League: Segunda Asturfútbol – Group 2
- 2024–25: Primera Asturfútbol, 17th of 20 (relegated)
Home colours	Away colours

Club Deportivo Turón is a football team based in the parish of Turón in Mieres, in the autonomous community of Asturias. Founded in 1925, the team plays in Segunda Asturfútbol – Group 2. The club's home ground is Estadio José Manuel Fernández Felgueroso, which has a capacity of 2,000 spectators.

== History ==
The club was created in 1925 and has spent 48 seasons in the Tercera División, being one of the teams with the most participation in this league. Its last season in the category was in 2002–03, when Turón finished last in Group II, earning only 10 points and conceding 111 goals.

== Season to season ==
Season	Level	Division	Place	Copa del Rey
1929–1945		Regional	—	
1945–46	5	2ª Reg.		
1946–47	4	1ª Reg.	4th	
1947–48	5	2ª Reg.		
1948–49	5	2ª Reg.		
1949–50	4	1ª Reg.	5th	
1950–51	4	1ª Reg.	6th	
1951–52	4	1ª Reg.	1st	
1952–53	3	3ª	13th	
1953–54	3	3ª	13th	
1954–55	3	3ª	7th	
1955–56	3	3ª	9th	
1956–57	3	3ª	4th	
1957–58	3	3ª	8th	
1958–59	3	3ª	4th	
1959–60	3	3ª	4th	
1960–61	3	3ª	8th	
1961–62	3	3ª	4th	
1962–63	3	3ª	13th	
1963–64	3	3ª	5th	

Season	Level	Division	Place	Copa del Rey
1964–65	3	3ª	8th	
1965–66	3	3ª	14th	
1966–67	3	3ª	9th	
1967–68	3	3ª	9th	
1968–69	3	3ª	12th	
1969–70	3	3ª	9th	Second round
1970–71	4	1ª Reg.	1st	
1971–72	3	3ª	17th	
1972–73	4	1ª Reg.	1st	
1973–74	3	3ª	11th	
1974–75	3	3ª	16th	Second round
1975–76	3	3ª	17th	First round
1976–77	4	Reg. Pref.	4th	
1977–78	4	3ª	10th	
1978–79	4	3ª	18th	Second round
1979–80	4	3ª	10th	Second round
1980–81	4	3ª	7th	Second round
1981–82	4	3ª	10th	
1982–83	4	3ª	7th	
1983–84	4	3ª	4th	

Season	Level	Division	Place	Copa del Rey
1984–85	4	3ª	7th	First round
1985–86	4	3ª	12th	
1986–87	4	3ª	16th	
1987–88	4	3ª	10th	
1988–89	4	3ª	2nd	
1989–90	4	3ª	10th	
1990–91	4	3ª	8th	
1991–92	4	3ª	9th	
1992–93	4	3ª	9th	
1993–94	4	3ª	14th	
1994–95	4	3ª	5th	
1995–96	4	3ª	14th	
1996–97	4	3ª	8th	
1997–98	4	3ª	20th	
1998–99	5	Reg. Pref.	3rd	
1999–2000	4	3ª	15th	
2000–01	4	3ª	10th	
2001–02	4	3ª	17th	
2002–03	4	3ª	20th	
2003–04	5	Reg. Pref.	11th	

Season	Level	Division	Place	Copa del Rey
2004–05	5	Reg. Pref.	12th	
2005–06	5	Reg. Pref.	16th	
2006–07	5	Reg. Pref.	20th	
2007–08	6	1ª Reg.	6th	
2008–09	6	1ª Reg.	8th	
2009–10	6	1ª Reg.	6th	
2010–11	6	1ª Reg.	6th	
2011–12	6	1ª Reg.	2nd	
2012–13	5	Reg. Pref.	16th	
2013–14	5	Reg. Pref.	15th	
2014–15	5	Reg. Pref.	10th	
2015–16	5	Reg. Pref.	8th	
2016–17	5	Reg. Pref.	17th	
2017–18	5	Reg. Pref.	17th	
2018–19	5	Reg. Pref.	15th	
2019–20	5	Reg. Pref.	19th	
2020–21	5	Reg. Pref.	5th	
2021–22	7	1ª Reg.	3rd	
2022–23	7	2ª RFFPA	6th	
2023–24	7	2ª Astur.	1st	

Season	Level	Division	Place	Copa del Rey
2024–25	6	1ª Astur.	17th	
2025–26	7	2ª Astur.		

- 48 seasons in Tercera División

== Notable players ==
- (Spain) Adrián Colunga
- (Spain) José Antonio Redondo
- (Spain) José Carrete de Julián
- (Spain) Jorge David López Fernández
