= 1965–66 Tercera División =

Tercera División
- Season: 1965–66

The 1965–66 Tercera División season was the 30th season since its establishment.

== League table ==
=== Group 1 ===
| Pos | Team | Pld | W | D | L | GF | GA | GD | Pts | Qualification or relegation |
|---|---|---|---|---|---|---|---|---|---|---|
| 1 | Ferrol | 30 | 26 | 3 | 1 | 111 | 15 | +96 | 55 | Promotion play-offs (champions) |
| 2 | Orense | 30 | 23 | 6 | 1 | 79 | 16 | +63 | 52 | Promotion/relegation play-offs |
| 3 | Couto | 30 | 16 | 6 | 8 | 54 | 43 | +11 | 38 | |
| 4 | Compostela | 30 | 17 | 4 | 9 | 59 | 42 | +17 | 38 | |
| 5 | Lugo | 30 | 15 | 8 | 7 | 71 | 34 | +37 | 38 | |
| 6 | Fabril | 30 | 15 | 7 | 8 | 67 | 36 | +31 | 37 | |
| 7 | Arosa | 30 | 10 | 7 | 13 | 29 | 42 | −13 | 27 | |
| 8 | Rápido Bouzas | 30 | 7 | 9 | 14 | 40 | 66 | −26 | 23 | |
| 9 | Turista | 30 | 7 | 9 | 14 | 43 | 59 | −16 | 23 | |
| 10 | Lemos | 30 | 9 | 5 | 16 | 38 | 57 | −19 | 23 | |
| 11 | Arenteiro | 30 | 10 | 3 | 17 | 35 | 56 | −21 | 23 | |
| 12 | Alondras | 30 | 8 | 6 | 16 | 33 | 62 | −29 | 22 | |
| 13 | Coruxo | 30 | 7 | 8 | 15 | 40 | 71 | −31 | 22 | |
| 14 | Brigantium | 30 | 10 | 2 | 18 | 35 | 67 | −32 | 22 | |
| 15 | Gran Peña | 30 | 9 | 4 | 17 | 34 | 70 | −36 | 22 | |
| 16 | Choco | 30 | 4 | 7 | 19 | 29 | 61 | −32 | 15 | Relegation to Regional |

=== Group 2 ===
| Pos | Team | Pld | W | D | L | GF | GA | GD | Pts | Qualification or relegation |
|---|---|---|---|---|---|---|---|---|---|---|
| 1 | Praviano | 30 | 24 | 4 | 2 | 70 | 20 | +50 | 52 | Promotion play-offs (champions) |
| 2 | Avilés | 30 | 21 | 4 | 5 | 79 | 23 | +56 | 46 | Promotion/relegation play-offs |
| 3 | Caudal | 30 | 17 | 8 | 5 | 62 | 35 | +27 | 42 | |
| 4 | Candás | 30 | 15 | 9 | 6 | 47 | 27 | +20 | 39 | |
| 5 | Ensidesa | 30 | 13 | 10 | 7 | 49 | 30 | +19 | 36 | |
| 6 | SD Camocha | 30 | 13 | 9 | 8 | 57 | 37 | +20 | 35 | |
| 7 | Vetusta | 30 | 13 | 8 | 9 | 74 | 45 | +29 | 34 | |
| 8 | San Martín | 30 | 13 | 5 | 12 | 50 | 54 | −4 | 31 | |
| 9 | Luarca | 30 | 11 | 5 | 14 | 32 | 50 | −18 | 27 | |
| 10 | Pelayo | 30 | 7 | 11 | 12 | 37 | 50 | −13 | 25 | |
| 11 | Calzada | 30 | 10 | 4 | 16 | 46 | 55 | −9 | 24 | |
| 12 | Santa Marina | 30 | 8 | 7 | 15 | 30 | 55 | −25 | 23 | |
| 13 | Siero | 30 | 7 | 9 | 14 | 30 | 54 | −24 | 23 | |
| 14 | Turón | 30 | 7 | 4 | 19 | 35 | 68 | −33 | 18 | |
| 15 | Lieres | 30 | 5 | 3 | 22 | 32 | 82 | −50 | 13 | Relegation to Regional |
| 16 | Ceares | 30 | 3 | 6 | 21 | 36 | 81 | −45 | 12 | Relegation to Regional |

=== Group 3 ===
| Pos | Team | Pld | W | D | L | GF | GA | GD | Pts | Qualification or relegation |
|---|---|---|---|---|---|---|---|---|---|---|
| 1 | Gimnástica de Torrelavega | 30 | 18 | 8 | 4 | 61 | 31 | +30 | 44 | Promotion play-offs (champions) |
| 2 | Rayo Cantabria | 30 | 17 | 8 | 5 | 54 | 27 | +27 | 42 | Promotion/relegation play-offs |
| 3 | SD Amorebieta | 30 | 15 | 6 | 9 | 51 | 33 | +18 | 36 | |
| 4 | Sestao | 30 | 15 | 6 | 9 | 52 | 37 | +15 | 36 | |
| 5 | Basconia | 30 | 15 | 5 | 10 | 57 | 41 | +16 | 35 | |
| 6 | Laredo | 30 | 10 | 9 | 11 | 35 | 54 | −19 | 29 | |
| 7 | Santurtzi | 30 | 10 | 9 | 11 | 40 | 37 | +3 | 29 | |
| 8 | Unión Club | 30 | 11 | 7 | 12 | 29 | 45 | −16 | 29 | |
| 9 | Arenas Guecho | 30 | 11 | 6 | 13 | 49 | 45 | +4 | 28 | |
| 10 | Barreda | 30 | 6 | 15 | 9 | 37 | 40 | −3 | 27 | |
| 11 | Erandio | 30 | 11 | 5 | 14 | 38 | 46 | −8 | 27 | |
| 12 | Galdácano | 30 | 11 | 5 | 14 | 42 | 48 | −6 | 27 | |
| 13 | Portugalete | 30 | 10 | 6 | 14 | 35 | 33 | +2 | 26 | Relegation to Regional |
| 14 | Guecho | 30 | 11 | 4 | 15 | 43 | 44 | −1 | 26 | Relegation to Regional |
| 15 | San Vicente | 30 | 7 | 7 | 16 | 44 | 76 | −32 | 21 | Relegation to Regional |
| 16 | CD Guarnizo | 30 | 6 | 6 | 18 | 38 | 68 | −30 | 18 | Relegation to Regional |

=== Group 4 ===
| Pos | Team | Pld | W | D | L | GF | GA | GD | Pts | Qualification or relegation |
|---|---|---|---|---|---|---|---|---|---|---|
| 1 | Logroñés | 30 | 19 | 6 | 5 | 62 | 34 | +28 | 44 | Promotion play-offs (champions) |
| 2 | Éibar | 30 | 18 | 5 | 7 | 69 | 27 | +42 | 41 | Promotion/relegation play-offs |
| 3 | Dep. Alavés | 30 | 14 | 11 | 5 | 64 | 40 | +24 | 39 | |
| 4 | Mondragón | 30 | 12 | 9 | 9 | 47 | 43 | +4 | 33 | |
| 5 | Motrico | 30 | 12 | 7 | 11 | 53 | 43 | +10 | 31 | |
| 6 | Calahorra | 30 | 13 | 4 | 13 | 52 | 62 | −10 | 30 | |
| 7 | Real Unión | 30 | 13 | 3 | 14 | 43 | 34 | +9 | 29 | |
| 8 | San Sebastián | 30 | 12 | 5 | 13 | 66 | 69 | −3 | 29 | |
| 9 | Chantrea | 30 | 12 | 5 | 13 | 43 | 51 | −8 | 29 | |
| 10 | Touring | 30 | 12 | 4 | 14 | 52 | 53 | −1 | 28 | |
| 11 | CD Oberena | 30 | 11 | 5 | 14 | 44 | 54 | −10 | 27 | |
| 12 | CD Alfaro | 30 | 10 | 7 | 13 | 48 | 59 | −11 | 27 | |
| 13 | Haro | 30 | 10 | 5 | 15 | 38 | 60 | −22 | 25 | |
| 14 | Euskalduna | 30 | 8 | 7 | 15 | 36 | 47 | −11 | 23 | |
| 15 | Mirandés | 30 | 10 | 3 | 17 | 40 | 63 | −23 | 23 | Relegation to Regional |
| 16 | UC Villafranca | 30 | 5 | 12 | 13 | 37 | 55 | −18 | 22 | Relegation to Regional |

=== Group 5 ===
| Pos | Team | Pld | W | D | L | GF | GA | GD | Pts | Qualification or relegation |
|---|---|---|---|---|---|---|---|---|---|---|
| 1 | CD Numancia | 28 | 21 | 3 | 4 | 82 | 22 | +60 | 45 | Promotion play-offs (champions) |
| 2 | Calvo Sotelo Andorra | 28 | 18 | 7 | 3 | 70 | 20 | +50 | 43 | Promotion/relegation play-offs |
| 3 | Huesca | 28 | 17 | 5 | 6 | 73 | 22 | +51 | 39 | |
| 4 | CD Teruel | 28 | 14 | 9 | 5 | 47 | 31 | +16 | 37 | |
| 5 | Barbastro | 28 | 17 | 1 | 10 | 48 | 40 | +8 | 35 | |
| 6 | Calvo Sotelo Es. | 28 | 14 | 4 | 10 | 40 | 41 | −1 | 32 | |
| 7 | Atlético Monzón | 28 | 12 | 7 | 9 | 52 | 42 | +10 | 31 | |
| 8 | SD Ejea | 28 | 8 | 8 | 12 | 43 | 53 | −10 | 24 | |
| 9 | Arenas Zaragoza | 28 | 8 | 7 | 13 | 35 | 48 | −13 | 23 | |
| 10 | Utebo | 28 | 8 | 7 | 13 | 34 | 51 | −17 | 23 | |
| 11 | Jacetano | 28 | 9 | 5 | 14 | 47 | 60 | −13 | 23 | |
| 12 | Mequinenza | 28 | 8 | 6 | 14 | 51 | 65 | −14 | 22 | |
| 13 | Renfe | 28 | 8 | 2 | 18 | 30 | 68 | −38 | 18 | |
| 14 | Caspe | 28 | 7 | 2 | 19 | 27 | 67 | −40 | 16 | |
| 15 | Aragón | 28 | 2 | 5 | 21 | 20 | 69 | −49 | 9 | |

=== Group 6 / 7 ===
| Pos | Team | Pld | W | D | L | GF | GA | GD | Pts | Qualification or relegation |
|---|---|---|---|---|---|---|---|---|---|---|
| 1 | G. Tarragona | 38 | 23 | 7 | 8 | 69 | 29 | +40 | 53 | Promotion play-offs (champions) |
| 2 | Sans | 38 | 19 | 10 | 9 | 75 | 48 | +27 | 48 | Promotion play-offs (champions) |
| 3 | Olot | 38 | 19 | 10 | 9 | 65 | 37 | +28 | 48 | Promotion/relegation play-offs |
| 4 | Terrassa FC | 38 | 20 | 6 | 12 | 60 | 45 | +15 | 46 | Promotion/relegation play-offs |
| 5 | San Andrés | 38 | 16 | 9 | 13 | 59 | 50 | +9 | 41 | |
| 6 | Balaguer | 38 | 15 | 9 | 14 | 47 | 48 | −1 | 39 | |
| 7 | Girona | 38 | 14 | 10 | 14 | 52 | 48 | +4 | 38 | |
| 8 | CE Mataró | 38 | 17 | 4 | 17 | 58 | 50 | +8 | 38 | |
| 9 | Villanueva | 38 | 14 | 10 | 14 | 68 | 71 | −3 | 38 | |
| 10 | Calella | 38 | 15 | 8 | 15 | 51 | 68 | −17 | 38 | |
| 11 | Tortosa | 38 | 15 | 8 | 15 | 66 | 59 | +7 | 38 | |
| 12 | EC Granollers | 38 | 16 | 6 | 16 | 55 | 57 | −2 | 38 | |
| 13 | Vich | 38 | 15 | 6 | 17 | 54 | 61 | −7 | 36 | |
| 14 | Figueras | 38 | 14 | 8 | 16 | 55 | 61 | −6 | 36 | |
| 15 | CE Manresa | 38 | 12 | 11 | 15 | 51 | 50 | +1 | 35 | |
| 16 | At. Cataluña | 38 | 13 | 9 | 16 | 53 | 64 | −11 | 35 | |
| 17 | Júpiter | 38 | 12 | 10 | 16 | 50 | 70 | −20 | 34 | |
| 18 | Reus | 38 | 14 | 5 | 19 | 64 | 62 | +2 | 33 | |
| 19 | Gavà | 38 | 10 | 7 | 21 | 55 | 83 | −28 | 27 | Relegation to Regional |
| 20 | Puigreig | 38 | 6 | 9 | 23 | 40 | 86 | −46 | 21 | Relegation to Regional |

=== Group 8 ===
| Pos | Team | Pld | W | D | L | GF | GA | GD | Pts | Qualification |
|---|---|---|---|---|---|---|---|---|---|---|
| 1 | Mahón | 18 | 15 | 1 | 2 | 46 | 5 | +41 | 31 | Promotion play-offs (champions) |
| 2 | At. Baleares | 18 | 13 | 0 | 5 | 41 | 12 | +29 | 26 | Promotion/relegation play-offs |
| 3 | Menorca | 18 | 10 | 3 | 5 | 31 | 15 | +16 | 23 | |
| 4 | Palma | 18 | 10 | 2 | 6 | 26 | 18 | +8 | 22 | |
| 5 | CD Soledad | 18 | 7 | 3 | 8 | 25 | 28 | −3 | 17 | |
| 6 | SD Ibiza | 18 | 7 | 2 | 9 | 19 | 31 | −12 | 16 | |
| 7 | CE Manacor | 18 | 6 | 2 | 10 | 24 | 40 | −16 | 14 | |
| 8 | At. Ciutadella | 18 | 3 | 7 | 8 | 11 | 23 | −12 | 13 | |
| 9 | CE Alaior | 18 | 2 | 6 | 10 | 11 | 33 | −22 | 10 | |
| 10 | Poblense | 18 | 2 | 4 | 12 | 14 | 43 | −29 | 8 | |

=== Group 9 ===
| Pos | Team | Pld | W | D | L | GF | GA | GD | Pts | Qualification or relegation |
|---|---|---|---|---|---|---|---|---|---|---|
| 1 | Castellón | 34 | 22 | 8 | 4 | 83 | 28 | +55 | 52 | Promotion play-offs (champions) |
| 2 | Onteniente | 34 | 21 | 3 | 10 | 67 | 39 | +28 | 45 | Promotion/relegation play-offs |
| 3 | CF Gandía | 34 | 18 | 8 | 8 | 73 | 31 | +42 | 44 | |
| 4 | Burriana | 34 | 16 | 9 | 9 | 68 | 45 | +23 | 41 | |
| 5 | CD Acero | 34 | 20 | 1 | 13 | 69 | 48 | +21 | 41 | |
| 6 | CD Alcoyano | 34 | 15 | 9 | 10 | 59 | 49 | +10 | 39 | |
| 7 | Carcagente | 34 | 17 | 4 | 13 | 57 | 43 | +14 | 38 | |
| 8 | At. Levante | 34 | 13 | 8 | 13 | 51 | 51 | 0 | 34 | |
| 9 | Sueca | 34 | 12 | 7 | 15 | 49 | 60 | −11 | 31 | |
| 10 | Requena | 34 | 13 | 5 | 16 | 51 | 60 | −9 | 31 | |
| 11 | Atlético Saguntino | 34 | 12 | 6 | 16 | 44 | 64 | −20 | 30 | |
| 12 | Buñol | 34 | 11 | 7 | 16 | 44 | 65 | −21 | 29 | |
| 13 | CD Onda | 34 | 10 | 8 | 16 | 35 | 52 | −17 | 28 | |
| 14 | Torrente | 34 | 11 | 6 | 17 | 43 | 56 | −13 | 28 | |
| 15 | Benicarló | 34 | 10 | 8 | 16 | 45 | 67 | −22 | 28 | |
| 16 | Olímpico | 34 | 11 | 5 | 18 | 39 | 54 | −15 | 27 | |
| 17 | Oliva | 34 | 13 | 1 | 20 | 51 | 72 | −21 | 27 | |
| 18 | UD Alzira | 34 | 8 | 3 | 23 | 41 | 85 | −44 | 19 | Relegation to Regional |

=== Group 10 ===
| Pos | Team | Pld | W | D | L | GF | GA | GD | Pts | Qualification or relegation |
|---|---|---|---|---|---|---|---|---|---|---|
| 1 | Eldense | 30 | 23 | 4 | 3 | 76 | 17 | +59 | 50 | Promotion play-offs (champions) |
| 2 | Cartagena | 30 | 21 | 6 | 3 | 64 | 23 | +41 | 48 | Promotion/relegation play-offs |
| 3 | Albacete | 30 | 18 | 6 | 6 | 47 | 33 | +14 | 42 | |
| 4 | Alicante | 30 | 15 | 5 | 10 | 65 | 48 | +17 | 35 | |
| 5 | Águilas | 30 | 16 | 2 | 12 | 49 | 37 | +12 | 34 | |
| 6 | Real Murcia Imperial | 30 | 14 | 5 | 11 | 67 | 47 | +20 | 33 | |
| 7 | Rayo Ibense | 30 | 12 | 8 | 10 | 60 | 48 | +12 | 32 | |
| 8 | Jumilla | 30 | 10 | 7 | 13 | 48 | 56 | −8 | 27 | |
| 9 | At. Cartagena | 30 | 11 | 5 | 14 | 49 | 61 | −12 | 27 | |
| 10 | Orihuela | 30 | 10 | 6 | 14 | 40 | 43 | −3 | 26 | |
| 11 | Novelda | 30 | 9 | 7 | 14 | 46 | 50 | −4 | 25 | |
| 12 | Cieza | 30 | 8 | 8 | 14 | 25 | 56 | −31 | 24 | |
| 13 | Ilicitano | 30 | 8 | 6 | 16 | 45 | 60 | −15 | 22 | |
| 14 | La Roda | 30 | 7 | 8 | 15 | 30 | 66 | −36 | 22 | |
| 15 | Abarán | 30 | 6 | 7 | 17 | 33 | 54 | −21 | 16 | Relegation to Regional |
| 16 | Lorca | 30 | 5 | 4 | 21 | 31 | 76 | −45 | 14 | Relegation to Regional |

=== Group 11 ===
| Pos | Team | Pld | W | D | L | GF | GA | GD | Pts | Qualification or relegation |
|---|---|---|---|---|---|---|---|---|---|---|
| 1 | Linense | 28 | 19 | 3 | 6 | 45 | 21 | +24 | 41 | Promotion play-offs (champions) |
| 2 | Marbella | 28 | 16 | 6 | 6 | 56 | 31 | +25 | 38 | Promotion/relegation play-offs |
| 3 | Almería | 28 | 15 | 6 | 7 | 46 | 27 | +19 | 36 | |
| 4 | At. Malagueño | 28 | 14 | 8 | 6 | 52 | 26 | +26 | 36 | |
| 5 | Real Jaén | 28 | 13 | 7 | 8 | 37 | 27 | +10 | 33 | |
| 6 | Iliturgi | 28 | 14 | 2 | 12 | 45 | 37 | +8 | 30 | |
| 7 | Adra | 28 | 13 | 3 | 12 | 34 | 39 | −5 | 29 | |
| 8 | At. Algeciras | 28 | 13 | 2 | 13 | 39 | 38 | +1 | 28 | |
| 9 | Recre. Granada | 28 | 11 | 6 | 11 | 44 | 49 | −5 | 28 | |
| 10 | CD Fuengirola | 28 | 9 | 6 | 13 | 35 | 42 | −7 | 24 | |
| 11 | Santana Linares | 28 | 8 | 6 | 14 | 36 | 48 | −12 | 22 | |
| 12 | Torremolinos | 28 | 9 | 3 | 16 | 33 | 46 | −13 | 21 | |
| 13 | Imperio Ceuta | 28 | 7 | 7 | 14 | 32 | 54 | −22 | 21 | |
| 14 | Antequera | 28 | 9 | 1 | 18 | 20 | 40 | −20 | 16 | Relegation to Regional |
| 15 | Cordobés | 28 | 5 | 4 | 19 | 29 | 58 | −29 | 14 | Relegation to Regional |
| 16 | Ronda | 0 | - | - | - | - | - | — | 0 | Withdrawn |

=== Group 12 ===
| Pos | Team | Pld | W | D | L | GF | GA | GD | Pts | Qualification or relegation |
|---|---|---|---|---|---|---|---|---|---|---|
| 1 | Jerez Industrial | 29 | 21 | 5 | 3 | 64 | 20 | +44 | 47 | Promotion play-offs (champions) |
| 2 | Sevilla Atlético | 30 | 21 | 5 | 4 | 88 | 27 | +61 | 47 | Promotion/relegation play-offs |
| 3 | Xerez | 30 | 21 | 4 | 5 | 63 | 19 | +44 | 46 | |
| 4 | San Fernando | 30 | 15 | 8 | 7 | 58 | 32 | +26 | 38 | |
| 5 | At. Onubense | 30 | 12 | 9 | 9 | 36 | 30 | +6 | 33 | |
| 6 | Portuense | 29 | 10 | 11 | 8 | 46 | 35 | +11 | 31 | |
| 7 | Triana | 30 | 9 | 13 | 8 | 36 | 38 | −2 | 31 | |
| 8 | Utrera | 30 | 11 | 5 | 14 | 44 | 56 | −12 | 27 | |
| 9 | Ayamonte | 30 | 7 | 11 | 12 | 28 | 37 | −9 | 25 | |
| 10 | Sanluqueño | 30 | 8 | 9 | 13 | 36 | 47 | −11 | 25 | |
| 11 | Alcalá | 30 | 10 | 4 | 16 | 36 | 55 | −19 | 24 | |
| 12 | Coria | 30 | 10 | 4 | 16 | 40 | 64 | −24 | 24 | |
| 13 | Riotinto | 30 | 8 | 6 | 16 | 31 | 65 | −34 | 22 | |
| 14 | Balón | 30 | 9 | 4 | 17 | 27 | 48 | −21 | 22 | |
| 15 | Puerto Real | 30 | 6 | 7 | 17 | 32 | 65 | −33 | 19 | Relegation to Regional |
| 16 | Chiclanero | 30 | 6 | 5 | 19 | 29 | 56 | −27 | 13 | Relegation to Regional |

=== Group 13 ===
| Pos | Team | Pld | W | D | L | GF | GA | GD | Pts | Qualification or relegation |
|---|---|---|---|---|---|---|---|---|---|---|
| 1 | Ponferradina | 30 | 23 | 6 | 1 | 104 | 24 | +80 | 52 | Promotion play-offs (champions) |
| 2 | C. Leonesa | 30 | 23 | 5 | 2 | 90 | 18 | +72 | 51 | Promotion/relegation play-offs |
| 3 | Salamanca | 30 | 21 | 3 | 6 | 84 | 18 | +66 | 45 | |
| 4 | Hullera | 30 | 14 | 5 | 11 | 57 | 48 | +9 | 33 | |
| 5 | Europa Delicias | 30 | 11 | 7 | 12 | 45 | 45 | 0 | 29 | |
| 6 | Gim. Medinense | 30 | 12 | 4 | 14 | 40 | 70 | −30 | 28 | |
| 7 | La Bañeza | 30 | 13 | 2 | 15 | 42 | 85 | −43 | 28 | |
| 8 | Castilla | 30 | 11 | 5 | 14 | 43 | 59 | −16 | 27 | |
| 9 | Juventud | 30 | 10 | 7 | 13 | 50 | 46 | +4 | 27 | |
| 10 | Ciudad Rodrigo | 30 | 12 | 2 | 16 | 61 | 62 | −1 | 26 | |
| 11 | Béjar Industrial | 30 | 10 | 5 | 15 | 49 | 66 | −17 | 25 | |
| 12 | Júpiter Leonés | 30 | 9 | 6 | 15 | 36 | 53 | −17 | 24 | |
| 13 | G. Arandina | 30 | 10 | 3 | 17 | 46 | 69 | −23 | 23 | |
| 14 | Laciana | 30 | 7 | 9 | 14 | 44 | 70 | −26 | 23 | |
| 15 | Hulleras Sabero | 30 | 8 | 6 | 16 | 37 | 58 | −21 | 22 | Relegation to Regional |
| 16 | Astorga | 30 | 7 | 3 | 20 | 51 | 88 | −37 | 17 | Relegation to Regional |

=== Group 14 ===
| Pos | Team | Pld | W | D | L | GF | GA | GD | Pts | Qualification |
|---|---|---|---|---|---|---|---|---|---|---|
| 1 | Plus Ultra | 28 | 17 | 8 | 3 | 65 | 16 | +49 | 42 | Promotion play-offs (champions) |
| 2 | Moscardó | 28 | 15 | 8 | 5 | 54 | 25 | +29 | 38 | Promotion/relegation play-offs |
| 3 | Talavera | 28 | 16 | 6 | 6 | 44 | 21 | +23 | 38 | |
| 4 | Gim. Segoviana | 28 | 12 | 9 | 7 | 45 | 36 | +9 | 33 | |
| 5 | Conquense | 28 | 11 | 9 | 8 | 44 | 44 | 0 | 31 | |
| 6 | Getafe | 28 | 10 | 10 | 8 | 50 | 42 | +8 | 30 | |
| 7 | Alcalá | 28 | 11 | 7 | 10 | 54 | 60 | −6 | 29 | |
| 8 | Boetticher | 28 | 10 | 7 | 11 | 34 | 33 | +1 | 27 | |
| 9 | Femsa | 28 | 8 | 11 | 9 | 44 | 54 | −10 | 27 | |
| 10 | Toledo | 28 | 10 | 6 | 12 | 42 | 45 | −3 | 26 | |
| 11 | Aranjuez | 28 | 8 | 8 | 12 | 36 | 42 | −6 | 24 | |
| 12 | Ávila | 28 | 7 | 8 | 13 | 36 | 56 | −20 | 22 | |
| 13 | Carabanchel | 28 | 7 | 6 | 15 | 35 | 48 | −13 | 20 | |
| 14 | Santa Bárbara | 28 | 5 | 8 | 15 | 26 | 61 | −35 | 18 | |
| 15 | Torrijos | 28 | 3 | 9 | 16 | 24 | 50 | −26 | 13 | |

=== Group 15 ===
| Pos | Team | Pld | W | D | L | GF | GA | GD | Pts | Qualification |
|---|---|---|---|---|---|---|---|---|---|---|
| 1 | Extremadura | 28 | 19 | 6 | 3 | 83 | 24 | +59 | 44 | Promotion play-offs (champions) |
| 2 | Díter Zafra | 28 | 17 | 6 | 5 | 60 | 25 | +35 | 40 | Promotion/relegation play-offs |
| 3 | Manchego | 28 | 17 | 5 | 6 | 52 | 23 | +29 | 39 | |
| 4 | Cacereño | 28 | 16 | 6 | 6 | 51 | 31 | +20 | 38 | |
| 5 | Tomelloso | 28 | 16 | 4 | 8 | 45 | 35 | +10 | 36 | |
| 6 | Villarrobledo | 28 | 12 | 8 | 8 | 30 | 29 | +1 | 32 | |
| 7 | Don Benito | 28 | 11 | 8 | 9 | 40 | 36 | +4 | 30 | |
| 8 | Madrileño | 28 | 9 | 9 | 10 | 42 | 51 | −9 | 27 | |
| 9 | Emeritense | 28 | 10 | 5 | 13 | 41 | 46 | −5 | 25 | |
| 10 | Bolañego | 28 | 9 | 5 | 14 | 30 | 50 | −20 | 23 | |
| 11 | Plasencia | 28 | 8 | 6 | 14 | 42 | 48 | −6 | 22 | |
| 12 | Socuéllamos | 28 | 10 | 1 | 17 | 36 | 53 | −17 | 21 | |
| 13 | Pedro Muñoz | 28 | 6 | 8 | 14 | 30 | 47 | −17 | 20 | |
| 14 | Pastas Gallo | 28 | 4 | 5 | 19 | 20 | 62 | −42 | 13 | |
| 15 | Alcázar | 28 | 2 | 6 | 20 | 20 | 62 | −42 | 8 | |

== Play-offs ==
=== Promotion/relegation Segunda División ===
==== First round ====
| Team 1 | Agg. | Team 2 | 1st leg | 2nd leg |
|---|---|---|---|---|
| Onteniente | 3 - 4 | Eibar | 3-2 | 0-2 |
| Cartagena | 2 - 2 | C. Leonesa | 2-1 | 0-1 |
| Moscardó | 4 - 4 | D. Zafra | 2-1 | 2-3 |
| C.S. Andorra | 3 - 2 | Rayo Cantabria | 3-1 | 0-1 |
| Terrassa | 5 - 1 | Olot | 4-0 | 1-1 |
| Sevilla At. | 4 - 4 | At. Baleares | 3-0 | 1-4 |
| Avilés | 0 - 2 | Orense | 0-1 | 0-1 |

- Tiebreaker:

| Team 1 | Score | Team 2 |
|---|---|---|
| Cartagena | 0 - 0 | C. Leonesa |
| Moscardó | 0 - 1 | D. Zafra |
| Sevilla At. | 1 - 2 | At. Baleares |

- Marbella received a bye.

Cartagena was qualified by beating 11 to 10 the number of corners, in the tiebreaker match.

==== Second round ====
| Team 1 | Agg. | Team 2 | 1st leg | 2nd leg |
|---|---|---|---|---|
| Eibar | 2 - 1 | Cartagena | 2-0 | 0-1 |
| Díter Zafra | 3 - 3 | C.S. Andorra | 1-1 | 2-2 |
| Terrassa | 3 - 3 | At. Baleares | 2-1 | 1-2 |
| Marbella | 4 - 4 | Orense | 3-2 | 1-2 |

- Tiebreaker:

| Team 1 | Score | Team 2 |
|---|---|---|
| Díter Zafra | 0 - 1 | C.S. Andorra |
| Terrassa | 4 - 3 | At. Baleares |
| Marbella | 4 - 3 | Orense |

==== Final Round ====
| Team 1 | Agg. | Team 2 | 1st leg | 2nd leg |
|---|---|---|---|---|
| Marbella | 2 - 4 | Langreo | 1-0 | 1-4 |
| Terrassa | 1 - 1 | Europa | 1-0 | 0-1 |
| Eibar | 2 - 3 | Constancia | 2-0 | 0-3 |
| Calvo Sotelo Andorra | 5 - 8 | At. Ceuta | 4-2 | 1-6 |

- Tiebreaker:

| Team 1 | Score | Team 2 |
|---|---|---|
| Terrassa | 3 - 4 | Europa |

Continue in Segunda División
| Langreo | Europa | Constancia | At. Ceuta |

=== Play-offs (champions) ===
==== First round ====
| Team 1 | Agg. | Team 2 | 1st leg | 2nd leg |
|---|---|---|---|---|
| Ferrol | 8 - 1 | Praviano | 5-0 | 3-1 |
| Extremadura | 2 - 4 | Sans | 1-1 | 1-3 |
| Torrelavega | 3 - 1 | Numancia | 2-0 | 1-1 |
| Linense | 0 - 1 | Plus Ultra | 0-0 | 0-1 |
| Mahón | 2 - 3 | Jerez Industrial | 2-0 | 0-3 |
| Tarragona | 0 - 1 | Castellón | 0-0 | 0-1 |
| Ponferradina | 2 - 6 | Eldense | 2-1 | 0-5 |

- Logroñés received a bye.

==== Second round ====
| Team 1 | Agg. | Team 2 | 1st leg | 2nd leg |
|---|---|---|---|---|
| Ferrol | 3 - 0 | Sans | 1-0 | 2-0 |
| Torrelavega | 3 - 1 | Plus Ultra | 2-0 | 1-1 |
| Logroñés | 5 - 5 | Jerez Industrial | 2-1 | 3-4 |
| Castellón | 6 - 2 | Eldense | 4-2 | 2-0 |

- Tiebreaker:

| Team 1 | Score | Team 2 |
|---|---|---|
| Logroñés | 1 - 0 | Jerez Industrial |

Promoted to Segunda División
| Ferrol | Torrelavega | Logroñés | Castellón |
