= 1966–67 Tercera División =

Tercera División
- Season: 1966–67

The 1966–67 Tercera División season is the 33rd since its establishment.

== Group 1 ==
Pos	Team	Pld	W	D	L	GF	GA	GD	Pts	Qualification or relegation
1	Orense	30	23	5	2	91	21	+70	51	Promotion play-offs (champions)
2	Lugo	30	21	5	4	74	23	+51	47	Promotion play-offs
3	Compostela	30	20	4	6	76	32	+44	44	
4	At. Orense	30	11	8	11	38	33	+5	30	
5	Fabril	30	11	8	11	61	50	+11	30	
6	Arosa	30	12	5	13	41	42	−1	29	
7	Turista	30	11	7	12	35	40	−5	29	
8	Gran Peña	30	11	7	12	49	51	−2	29	
9	Arsenal Ferrol	30	11	6	13	44	50	−6	28	
10	Rápido Bouzas	30	9	8	13	39	49	−10	26	
11	Lemos	30	10	6	14	30	45	−15	26	
12	Calvo Sotelo P.G.R.	30	10	5	15	36	49	−13	25	
13	Brigantium	30	9	6	15	29	50	−21	24	
14	Alondras	30	10	4	16	37	74	−37	24	
15	Corujo	30	8	6	16	32	68	−36	22	Relegation to Regional
16	Arenteiro	30	6	4	20	31	66	−35	16	Relegation to Regional

== Group 2 ==
Pos	Team	Pld	W	D	L	GF	GA	GD	Pts	Qualification or relegation
1	Avilés	30	20	9	1	85	17	+68	49	Promotion play-offs (champions)
2	Caudal	30	20	5	5	54	20	+34	45	Promotion play-offs
3	Candás	30	21	2	7	47	20	+27	44	
4	SD Camocha	30	18	4	8	55	32	+23	40	
5	Praviano	30	15	8	7	51	30	+21	38	
6	Ensidesa	30	15	8	7	64	31	+33	38	
7	Vetusta	30	13	6	11	55	49	+6	32	
8	San Martín	30	12	4	14	58	61	−3	28	
9	Turón	30	11	5	14	38	55	−17	27	
10	Titánico	30	11	5	14	42	50	−8	27	
11	Calzada	30	10	6	14	41	48	−7	26	
12	Entrego	30	9	4	17	36	46	−10	22	
13	Siero	30	8	4	18	29	52	−23	20	
14	Santa Marina	30	9	2	19	35	61	−26	20	
15	Luarca	30	7	5	18	25	61	−36	19	Relegation to Regional
16	Pelayo	30	2	1	27	18	100	−82	5	Relegation to Regional

== Group 3 ==
Pos	Team	Pld	W	D	L	GF	GA	GD	Pts	Qualification or relegation
1	Bilbao At.	30	19	8	3	85	26	+59	46	Promotion play-offs (champions)
2	Sestao	30	17	6	7	61	27	+34	40	Promotion play-offs
3	Baracaldo	30	18	3	9	61	33	+28	39	
4	Villosa	30	15	8	7	58	33	+25	38	
5	Rayo Cantabria	30	14	8	8	47	26	+21	36	
6	Arenas G.	30	12	8	10	48	36	+12	32	
7	Basconia	30	12	8	10	42	36	+6	32	
8	Deusto	30	12	7	11	37	38	−1	31	
9	Erandio	30	11	8	11	43	49	−6	30	
10	Santurce	30	10	7	13	34	57	−23	27	
11	Galdácano	30	9	8	13	31	38	−7	26	
12	Amorebieta	30	10	5	15	34	45	−11	25	
13	Santoña	30	9	7	14	37	58	−21	25	Relegation to Regional
14	Unión Club	30	6	7	17	20	52	−32	19	Relegation to Regional
15	Barreda	30	5	8	17	28	61	−33	18	Relegation to Regional
16	Laredo	30	5	6	19	16	67	−51	16	Relegation to Regional

== Group 4 ==
Pos	Team	Pld	W	D	L	GF	GA	GD	Pts	Qualification or relegation
1	Éibar	30	22	4	4	61	16	+45	48	Promotion play-offs (champions)
2	Real Unión	30	20	8	2	59	29	+30	48	Promotion play-offs
3	CD Oberena	30	13	8	9	53	46	+7	34	
4	Euskalduna	30	12	8	10	54	45	+9	32	
5	Chantrea	30	10	11	9	45	44	+1	31	
6	Calahorra	30	12	7	11	52	53	−1	31	
7	Dep. Alavés	30	13	4	13	50	38	+12	30	
8	Tudelano	30	11	7	12	42	52	−10	29	
9	Haro	30	11	7	12	48	59	−11	29	
10	Mondragón	30	9	11	10	58	47	+11	29	
11	San Sebastián	30	12	5	13	61	43	+18	29	
12	Motrico	30	11	5	14	60	59	+1	27	
13	Touring	30	9	9	12	34	36	−2	27	
14	Tolosa	30	9	7	14	33	48	−15	25	Relegation to Regional
15	Alfaro	30	9	3	18	36	69	−33	21	Relegation to Regional
16	Iruña	30	5	0	25	33	95	−62	10	Relegation to Regional

== Group 5 ==
Pos	Team	Pld	W	D	L	GF	GA	GD	Pts	Qualification or relegation
1	Huesca	30	23	6	1	71	16	+55	52	Promotion play-offs (champions)
2	Aragón	30	22	4	4	105	20	+85	48	Promotion play-offs
3	Calvo Sotelo Andorra	30	15	10	5	57	27	+30	40	
4	Ejea	30	12	11	7	33	42	−9	35	
5	Calvo Sotelo Esc.	30	13	8	9	63	46	+17	34	
6	Barbastro	30	14	6	10	43	33	+10	34	
7	Arenas Zaragoza	30	14	2	14	34	54	−20	30	
8	Teruel	30	12	5	13	51	46	+5	29	
9	Mequinenza	30	13	3	14	64	60	+4	29	
10	Caspe	30	11	5	14	39	59	−20	27	
11	Jacetano	30	10	7	13	39	57	−18	27	
12	Utebo	30	10	2	18	34	62	−28	22	
13	Binéfar	30	8	5	17	41	51	−10	21	
14	Monzón	30	9	3	18	42	64	−22	21	
15	Numancia	30	7	5	18	28	68	−40	19	
16	Renfe	30	3	6	21	30	69	−39	12	Relegation to Regional

== Group 6/7 ==
Pos	Team	Pld	W	D	L	GF	GA	GD	Pts	Qualification or relegation
1	Olot	38	23	5	10	87	50	+37	51	Promotion play-offs (champions)
2	Gimnàstico Tarragona	38	22	4	12	65	41	+24	48	Promotion play-offs (champions)
3	Gerona	38	21	6	11	70	45	+25	48	Promotion play-offs
4	Lloret	38	20	7	11	65	51	+14	47	Promotion play-offs
5	Reus	38	18	7	13	63	53	+10	43	
6	Sans	38	17	7	14	47	49	−2	41	
7	Tarrasa	38	15	11	12	53	41	+12	41	
8	San Andrés	38	16	9	13	55	52	+3	41	
9	Tortosa	38	17	5	16	62	53	+9	39	
10	Figueras	38	15	8	15	53	57	−4	38	
11	At. Cataluña	38	14	9	15	57	57	0	37	
12	Granollers	38	17	2	19	71	63	+8	36	
13	Manresa	38	13	9	16	58	66	−8	35	
14	Villanueva	38	13	9	16	50	57	−7	35	
15	Balaguer	38	14	7	17	52	63	−11	35	Relegation to Regional
16	Mataró	38	14	6	18	55	56	−1	34	Relegation to Regional
17	Igualada	38	12	10	16	49	59	−10	34	
18	Calella	38	10	7	21	39	75	−36	27	
19	Hospitalet	38	11	5	22	49	77	−28	27	Relegation to Regional
20	Vich	38	10	3	25	49	84	−35	23	Relegation to Regional

== Group 8 ==
Pos	Team	Pld	W	D	L	GF	GA	GD	Pts	Qualification or relegation
1	Mahón	22	18	4	0	59	16	+43	40	Promotion play-offs (champions)
2	Ibiza	22	16	2	4	58	27	+31	34	Promotion play-offs
3	At. Baleares	22	13	5	4	42	16	+26	31	
4	Soledad	22	10	5	7	31	23	+8	25	
5	Menorca	22	9	6	7	46	25	+21	24	
6	Palma	22	10	4	8	39	37	+2	24	
7	Manacor	22	10	1	11	32	38	−6	21	
8	At. Ciudadela	22	6	5	11	25	29	−4	17	
9	Alayor	22	5	4	13	28	52	−24	14	
10	Binisalem	22	4	6	12	16	42	−26	14	
11	Santa Catalina	22	4	4	14	27	53	−26	12	
12	Poblense	22	3	2	17	14	59	−45	8	

== Group 9 ==
Pos	Team	Pld	W	D	L	GF	GA	GD	Pts	Qualification or relegation
1	Alcoyano	34	21	6	7	81	35	+46	48	Promotion play-offs (champions)
2	Onteniente	34	20	6	8	75	41	+34	46	Promotion play-offs
3	CF Gandía	34	19	7	8	65	31	+34	45	
4	Burriana	34	17	7	10	53	37	+16	41	
5	CD Acero	34	18	5	11	59	42	+17	41	
6	Benicarló	34	16	6	12	46	41	+5	38	
7	Torrente	34	15	7	12	55	44	+11	37	
8	Onda	34	10	14	10	44	47	−3	34	
9	Buñol	34	11	10	13	38	47	−9	32	
10	Paiporta	34	12	7	15	48	55	−7	31	
11	Saguntino	34	12	6	16	55	67	−12	30	
12	At. Levante	34	12	5	17	52	51	+1	29	
13	Olímpico	34	11	7	16	47	65	−18	29	
14	Requena	34	11	7	16	33	51	−18	29	
15	Carcagente	34	10	8	16	37	57	−20	28	
16	Jávea	34	9	10	15	36	51	−15	28	
17	Sueca	34	9	8	17	34	53	−19	26	
18	Oliva	34	7	6	21	30	73	−43	20	Relegation to Regional

== Group 10 ==
Pos	Team	Pld	W	D	L	GF	GA	GD	Pts	Qualification or relegation
1	Eldense	30	21	5	4	88	26	+62	47	Promotion play-offs (champions)
2	Albacete	30	20	5	5	58	31	+27	45	Promotion play-offs
3	Alicante	30	19	4	7	71	26	+45	42	
4	Cartagena	30	16	7	7	54	25	+29	39	
5	Benidorm	30	14	8	8	60	45	+15	36	
6	Cieza	30	14	4	12	67	52	+15	32	
7	Orihuela	30	10	10	10	41	38	+3	30	
8	At. Cartagena	30	12	6	12	38	52	−14	30	
9	Ilicitano	30	10	8	12	48	45	+3	28	
10	Águilas	30	12	2	16	45	61	−16	26	
11	Imperial Murcia	30	9	7	14	50	46	+4	25	
12	Yeclano	30	11	3	16	42	58	−16	25	
13	Rayo Ibense	30	8	7	15	51	63	−12	23	
14	Novelda	30	10	3	17	42	65	−23	23	
15	Jumilla	30	9	4	17	36	64	−28	22	Relegation to Regional
16	La Roda	30	0	7	23	17	111	−94	7	Relegation to Regional

== Group 11 ==
Pos	Team	Pld	W	D	L	GF	GA	GD	Pts	Qualification or relegation
1	Jaén	30	21	3	6	67	27	+40	45	Promotion play-offs (champions)
2	Almería	30	17	7	6	54	28	+26	41	Promotion play-offs
3	Linense	30	15	11	4	56	25	+31	41	
4	Marbella	30	14	7	9	43	35	+8	35	
5	At. Malagueño	30	14	6	10	48	37	+11	34	
6	Melilla	30	12	9	9	50	32	+18	33	
7	Santana Linares	30	12	7	11	50	42	+8	31	
8	Estepona	30	13	5	12	46	51	−5	31	
9	Iliturgi	30	10	9	11	35	42	−7	29	
10	At. Algeciras	30	9	9	12	27	37	−10	27	
11	Recr. Granada	30	10	6	14	31	47	−16	26	
12	Olímpica Victoriana	30	8	9	13	37	51	−14	25	
13	Adra	30	9	6	15	29	48	−19	24	
14	Fuengirola	30	9	4	17	39	57	−18	22	
15	Torremolinos	30	6	6	18	40	59	−19	18	
16	Imperio Ceuta	30	5	8	17	29	63	−34	18	Relegation to Regional

== Group 12 ==
Pos	Team	Pld	W	D	L	GF	GA	GD	Pts	Qualification or relegation
1	Jerez	30	21	7	2	64	26	+38	49	Promotion play-offs (champions)
2	Jerez Industrial	30	19	10	1	75	21	+54	48	Promotion play-offs
3	Sevilla Atlético	30	19	7	4	71	26	+45	45	
4	Portuense	30	15	8	7	40	24	+16	38	
5	Triana	30	15	6	9	54	29	+25	36	
6	At. Onubense	30	13	7	10	38	32	+6	33	
7	San Fernando	30	12	6	12	56	44	+12	30	
8	Sanluqueño	30	13	3	14	37	40	−3	29	
9	Ayamonte	30	9	8	13	30	37	−7	26	
10	Coria	30	7	10	13	29	38	−9	24	
11	Riotinto	30	9	5	16	28	56	−28	23	
12	Balón	30	9	5	16	39	45	−6	23	
13	Alcalá	30	6	9	15	32	52	−20	21	
14	Rota	30	6	7	17	24	52	−28	19	
15	Utrera	30	6	6	18	25	72	−47	18	
16	San Roque	30	6	6	18	19	67	−48	18	Relegation to Regional

== Group 13 ==
Pos	Team	Pld	W	D	L	GF	GA	GD	Pts	Qualification or relegation
1	Salamanca	30	26	3	1	110	12	+98	55	Promotion play-offs (champions)
2	Ponferradina	30	25	1	4	84	21	+63	51	Promotion play-offs
3	C. Leonesa	30	21	5	4	98	21	+77	47	
4	Béjar Ind.	30	16	3	11	62	44	+18	35	
5	Europa Delicias	30	14	5	11	42	35	+7	33	
6	Gim. Arandina	30	13	7	10	41	56	−15	33	
7	Juventud	30	14	3	13	59	45	+14	31	
8	Bembibre	30	13	2	15	37	48	−11	28	
9	Júpiter Leonés	30	11	2	17	44	65	−21	24	
10	Gim. Medinense	30	9	6	15	40	70	−30	24	
11	Hullera	30	9	5	16	30	63	−33	23	
12	La Bañeza	30	9	3	18	41	78	−37	21	
13	Castilla	30	9	3	18	29	51	−22	21	
14	Salmantino	30	8	5	17	29	62	−33	21	
15	Ciudad Rodrigo	30	6	5	19	32	67	−35	17	Relegation to Regional
16	Laciana	30	8	0	22	44	84	−40	16	Relegation to Regional

== Group 14 ==
Pos	Team	Pld	W	D	L	GF	GA	GD	Pts	Qualification or relegation
1	Carabanchel	32	24	1	7	84	30	+54	49	Promotion play-offs (champions)
2	Moscardó	32	20	6	6	73	26	+47	46	Promotion play-offs
3	Alcalá	32	19	4	9	77	39	+38	42	
4	Conquense	32	14	9	9	51	39	+12	37	
5	Socuéllamos	32	13	11	8	47	32	+15	37	
6	Tomelloso	32	15	6	11	41	33	+8	36	
7	Pedro Muñoz	32	12	9	11	33	37	−4	33	
8	Getafe	32	9	12	11	50	48	+2	30	
9	Villarrobledo	32	11	8	13	31	49	−18	30	
10	Aranjuez	32	11	8	13	54	62	−8	30	
11	Alcázar	32	10	9	13	50	49	+1	29	
12	Valdepeñas	32	11	7	14	43	61	−18	29	
13	Madrileño	32	10	8	14	37	44	−7	28	
14	Boetticher	32	11	6	15	38	50	−12	28	
15	Femsa	32	9	8	15	49	65	−16	26	
16	Bolañego	32	10	4	18	32	60	−28	24	Relegation to Regional
17	Torrijos	32	2	6	24	21	87	−66	10	Relegation to Regional

== Group 15 ==
Pos	Team	Pld	W	D	L	GF	GA	GD	Pts	Qualification or relegation
1	Badajoz	34	23	8	3	105	13	+92	54	Promotion play-offs (champions)
2	Plus Ultra	34	24	4	6	83	19	+64	52	Promotion play-offs
3	Extremadura	34	22	7	5	89	25	+64	51	
4	Manchego	34	19	5	10	82	38	+44	43	
5	Toledo	34	17	7	10	61	41	+20	41	
6	Mérida Ind.	34	15	10	9	54	53	+1	40	
7	Cacereño	34	13	13	8	47	30	+17	39	
8	Talavera	34	16	7	11	67	52	+15	39	
9	Quintanar	34	15	6	13	63	53	+10	36	
10	Díter Zafra	34	14	7	13	64	61	+3	35	
11	Plasencia	34	12	6	16	45	51	−6	30	
12	At. Calvo Sotelo	34	8	11	15	55	63	−8	27	
13	Don Benito	34	9	9	16	30	60	−30	27	
14	Ávila	34	10	6	18	38	66	−28	26	
15	Gim. Segoviana	34	8	8	18	48	68	−20	24	
16	Santa Bárbara	34	6	8	20	31	92	−61	20	
17	Olivenza	34	7	4	23	30	95	−65	18	
18	Villacañas	34	3	4	27	15	127	−112	7	Relegation to Regional

== Playoffs ==
=== Promotion to Segunda División (champions) ===
==== First round ====
- Olot received a bye.

Team 1	Agg.	Team 2	1st leg	2nd leg
Eldense	0 - 5	Alcoyano	0-1	0-4
G. Tarragona	2 - 6	Jaén	1-2	1-4
Mahón	3 - 5	Eibar	3-2	0-3
Salamanca	4 - 2	Avilés	3-1	1-1
Jerez	1 - 1	Orense	1-0	0-1
Carabanchel	1 - 12	Badajoz	0-4	1-8
Huesca	0 - 1	Bilbao At.	0-0	0-1

- Match of Tiebreaker:

Team 1	Score	Team 2
Jerez	1 - 0	Orense

==== Second round ====
Team 1	Agg.	Team 2	1st leg	2nd leg
Olot	3 - 5	Alcoyano	3-1	0-4
Jaén	2 - 2	Éibar	1-0	1-2
Salamanca	3 - 4	Jerez	2-1	1-3
Badajoz	3 - 2	Bilbao At.	2-0	1-2

- Match of Tiebreaker:

Team 1	Score	Team 2
Jaén	1 - 0	Éibar

Promoted to Segunda División
Alcoyano	Jaén	Jerez	Badajoz

=== Promotion to Segunda División (runners-up) ===
==== First round ====
Team 1	Agg.	Team 2	1st leg	2nd leg
Ibiza	4 - 3	Moscardó	4-1	0-2
Sestao	2 - 3	Lugo	1-2	1-1
Real Unión	4 - 2	Jerez Ind.	2-0	2-2
Caudal	2 - 1	Lloret	2-0	0-1
Gerona	2 - 5	Plus Ultra	1-2	1-3
Onteniente	3 - 5	Aragón	2-0	1-5
Ponferradina	4 - 3	Albacete	3-0	1-3

- Almería received a bye.

==== Second round ====
Team 1	Agg.	Team 2	1st leg	2nd leg
Ibiza	1 - 4	Lugo	1-2	0-2
Real Unión	1 - 1	Caudal	1-0	0-1
Plus Ultra	4 - 5	Aragón	4-0	0-5
Almería	5 - 6	Ponferradina	2-0	3-6

- Match of Tiebreaker:

Team 1	Score	Team 2
Real Unión	3 - 0	Caudal

==== Final Round ====
Team 1	Agg.	Team 2	1st leg	2nd leg
Ponferradina	4 - 7	Langreo	2-2	2-5
Aragón	2 - 4	Burgos	1-0	1-4
Real Unión	2 - 4	At. Ceuta	2-2	0-2
Lugo	1 - 3	Constancia	1-1	0-2

Continue in Segunda División
Langreo	Burgos	At. Ceuta	Constancia
