= 1971–72 Tercera División =

Tercera División
- Season: 1971–72

The 1971–72 Tercera División season was the 38th edition since its establishment.

== League tables ==
=== Group I ===
Pos	Team	Pld	W	D	L	GF	GA	GD	Pts
1	Barakaldo	38	21	13	4	76	23	+53	55
2	Sestao	38	20	10	8	70	37	+33	50
3	Ourense	38	19	11	8	66	31	+35	49
4	Baskonia	38	20	8	10	60	37	+23	48
5	Ensidesa	38	17	7	14	61	50	+11	41
6	Gimnástica de Torrelavega	38	17	7	14	55	46	+9	41
7	Laudio	38	16	9	13	52	37	+15	41
8	Real Avilés	38	17	6	15	55	49	+6	40
9	Bilbao Athletic	38	16	7	15	55	45	+10	39
10	Mirandés	38	13	12	13	52	56	−4	38
11	Compostela	38	15	8	15	49	50	−1	38
12	Caudal	38	13	12	13	44	49	−5	38
13	Júpiter Leonés	38	15	7	16	41	46	−5	37
14	Ponferradina	38	14	9	15	45	50	−5	37
15	Lemos	38	13	9	16	38	64	−26	35
16	Lugo	38	10	13	15	37	52	−15	33
17	Turón	38	12	7	19	41	63	−22	31
18	Unión Club	38	10	7	21	37	75	−38	27
19	Fabril Deportivo	38	8	7	23	32	75	−43	23
20	Candás	38	6	7	25	37	68	−31	19

=== Group II ===
Pos	Team	Pld	W	D	L	GF	GA	GD	Pts
1	Osasuna	38	19	12	7	46	24	+22	50
2	Salamanca	38	22	6	10	52	32	+20	50
3	Atlético Madrileño	38	19	7	12	51	34	+17	45
4	Eibar	38	16	11	11	59	43	+16	43
5	Colonia Moscardó	38	14	14	10	52	43	+9	42
6	San Sebastián	38	17	7	14	66	34	+32	41
7	Alavés	38	17	7	14	45	44	+1	41
8	Calvo Sotelo	38	16	7	15	52	50	+2	39
9	Zamora	38	15	9	14	43	52	−9	39
10	Plus Ultra	38	14	10	14	46	42	+4	38
11	Palencia	38	14	10	14	49	46	+3	38
12	Huesca	38	16	6	16	49	51	−2	38
13	Talavera	38	14	9	15	41	53	−12	37
14	Getafe	38	14	8	16	46	46	0	36
15	Tudelano	38	16	4	18	45	46	−1	36
16	Calvo Sotelo Andorra	38	13	9	16	45	58	−13	35
17	Villaverde Boetticher	38	12	11	15	48	56	−8	35
18	Deportivo Aragón	38	11	6	21	31	51	−20	28
19	Real Unión	38	9	9	20	28	53	−25	27
20	Oberena	38	7	8	23	25	61	−36	22

=== Group III ===
Pos	Team	Pld	W	D	L	GF	GA	GD	Pts
1	Gimnàstic de Tarragona	38	19	12	7	48	25	+23	50
2	Terrassa	38	19	11	8	55	32	+23	49
3	Poblense	38	19	9	10	53	38	+15	47
4	Alcoyano	38	20	6	12	53	40	+13	46
5	Lleida	38	16	13	9	44	29	+15	45
6	Levante	38	16	12	10	52	32	+20	44
7	Ontinyent	38	19	6	13	50	45	+5	44
8	Girona	38	15	11	12	45	31	+14	41
9	Calella	38	16	8	14	44	39	+5	40
10	Atlético Baleares	38	13	11	14	36	38	−2	37
11	Atlètic de Ciutadella	38	15	5	18	39	62	−23	35
12	Tortosa	38	14	7	17	48	50	−2	35
13	Algemesí	38	12	10	16	35	51	−16	34
14	Ibiza	38	12	9	17	28	44	−16	33
15	Acero	38	12	9	17	60	69	−9	33
16	Europa	38	13	6	19	44	56	−12	32
17	Badalona	38	10	12	16	49	54	−5	32
18	Benicarló	38	10	11	17	45	63	−18	31
19	FC Barcelona Atlético	38	9	10	19	45	51	−6	28
20	Gandía	38	8	8	22	43	67	−24	24

=== Group IV ===
Pos	Team	Pld	W	D	L	GF	GA	GD	Pts
1	Real Murcia	38	27	8	3	77	27	+50	62
2	Cartagena	38	24	11	3	90	32	+58	59
3	Real Jaén	38	16	9	13	52	40	+12	41
4	Valdepeñas	38	17	7	14	66	59	+7	41
5	Melilla	38	17	6	15	50	41	+9	40
6	Portuense	38	14	11	13	41	37	+4	39
7	Balompédica Linense	38	15	9	14	48	45	+3	39
8	Badajoz	38	16	7	15	55	51	+4	39
9	Ceuta	38	15	8	15	49	46	+3	38
10	Eldense	38	11	16	11	42	46	−4	38
11	Atlético Malagueño	38	15	7	16	46	43	+3	37
12	Sevilla Atlético	38	14	9	15	44	54	−10	37
13	Recreativo de Huelva	38	12	13	13	48	39	+9	37
14	Cacereño	38	15	6	17	55	54	+1	36
15	Olímpic de Xàtiva	38	13	9	16	44	50	−6	35
16	Linares	38	11	13	14	34	47	−13	35
17	Triana	38	13	9	16	41	46	−5	35
18	Ilicitano	38	9	9	20	33	67	−34	27
19	Español de San Vicente	38	10	6	22	42	74	−32	26
20	África Ceutí	38	6	7	25	32	91	−59	19

== Promotion playoff ==
Team 1	Agg.	Team 2	1st leg	2nd leg
Racing de Santander	3–0	Salamanca	2–0	1–0
Hércules	4–2	Cartagena	3–1	1–1
Mestalla	4–2	Terrassa	4–1	0–1
Sestao	3–4	Cádiz	1–2	2–2

== Relegation playoff ==
Team 1	Agg.	Team 2	1st leg	2nd leg
Osasuna Promesas	3–2	Júpiter Leonés	2–0	1–2
Melilla	2–3	Ponferradina	2–0	0–3
Lemos	4–1	Mérida Industrial	2–0	2–1
Lugo	0–3	Pegaso	0–0	0–3
Júpiter	6–5	Talavera	4–2	2–3
Getafe	4–2	Tolosa	3–1	1–1
Tudelano	4–3	Rayo Cantabria	4–0	0–3
Lorca Deportiva	2–4	Calvo Sotelo Andorra	2–2	0–2
Algemesí	4–2	Erandio	3–0	1–2
Turista	0–6	Ibiza	0–3	0–3
Deportivo Gijón	3–8	Acero	1–1	2–7
Constància	0–4	Europa	0–0	0–4
Barbastro	1–2	Recreativo de Huelva	1–1	0–1
Cacereño	2–4	San Fernando	2–2	0–2
Olímpic de Xàtiva	2–0	Alzira	2–0	0–0
Salmantino	4–5	Linares	2–4	2–1

== Season records ==
- Most wins: 27, Real Murcia.
- Most draws: 16, Eldense.
- Most losses: 25, Candás and África Ceutí.
- Most goals for: 90, Cartagena.
- Most goals against: 91, África Ceutí.
- Most points: 62, Real Murcia.
- Fewest wins: 6, Candás and África Ceutí.
- Fewest draws: 5, Atlètic de Ciutadella.
- Fewest losses: 3, Real Murcia and Cartagena.
- Fewest goals for: 25, Oberena.
- Fewest goals against: 23, Barakaldo.
- Fewest points: 19, Candás and África Ceutí.
