= UD Gijón Industrial =

Association football club in Spain

Coordinates: 43.544838°N 5.698508°W

Gijón Industrial
- Full name: Unión Deportivo Gijón Industrial
- Nicknames: Indus, Fabril
- Founded: 10 July 1969; 57 years ago
- Ground: Santa Cruz, Gijón, Asturias, Spain
- Capacity: 2,500
- President: Diego Junquera
- Head coach: Miguel Angel Martín Tejedor
- League: Tercera Federación – Group 2
- 2025–26: Tercera Federación – Group 2, 14th of 18
- Website: gijonindustrial.es
Home colours	Away colours

Unión Deportivo Gijón Industrial is a football team based in Gijón in the autonomous community of Asturias. Founded in 1969, it plays in Tercera Federación – Group 2. The club's home ground is Santa Cruz, which has a capacity of 2,500 spectators.

== History ==
Gijón Industrial was founded on 10 July 1969 as a merger between Pelayo CF and Club Calzada, both immersed in serious economic trouble. The club started playing in Tercera División, when it was composed of inter-provincial groups, with its best season the 1977–78 one, when it finished third and qualified for the first time for the Copa del Rey.

After a first relegation the next season, Gijón Industrial returned to Tercera División three seasons later and four more times the Copa del Rey, before being again relegated to Regional Preferente in 1982. It spent eight seasons in this league before being promoted to Tercera in 1990. After this promotion, the club spent ten consecutive seasons in the fourth tier, the longest streak of the club, before being relegated again.

Since its foundation, the club has always alternated between Tercera División and Regional Preferente.

== Stadium ==
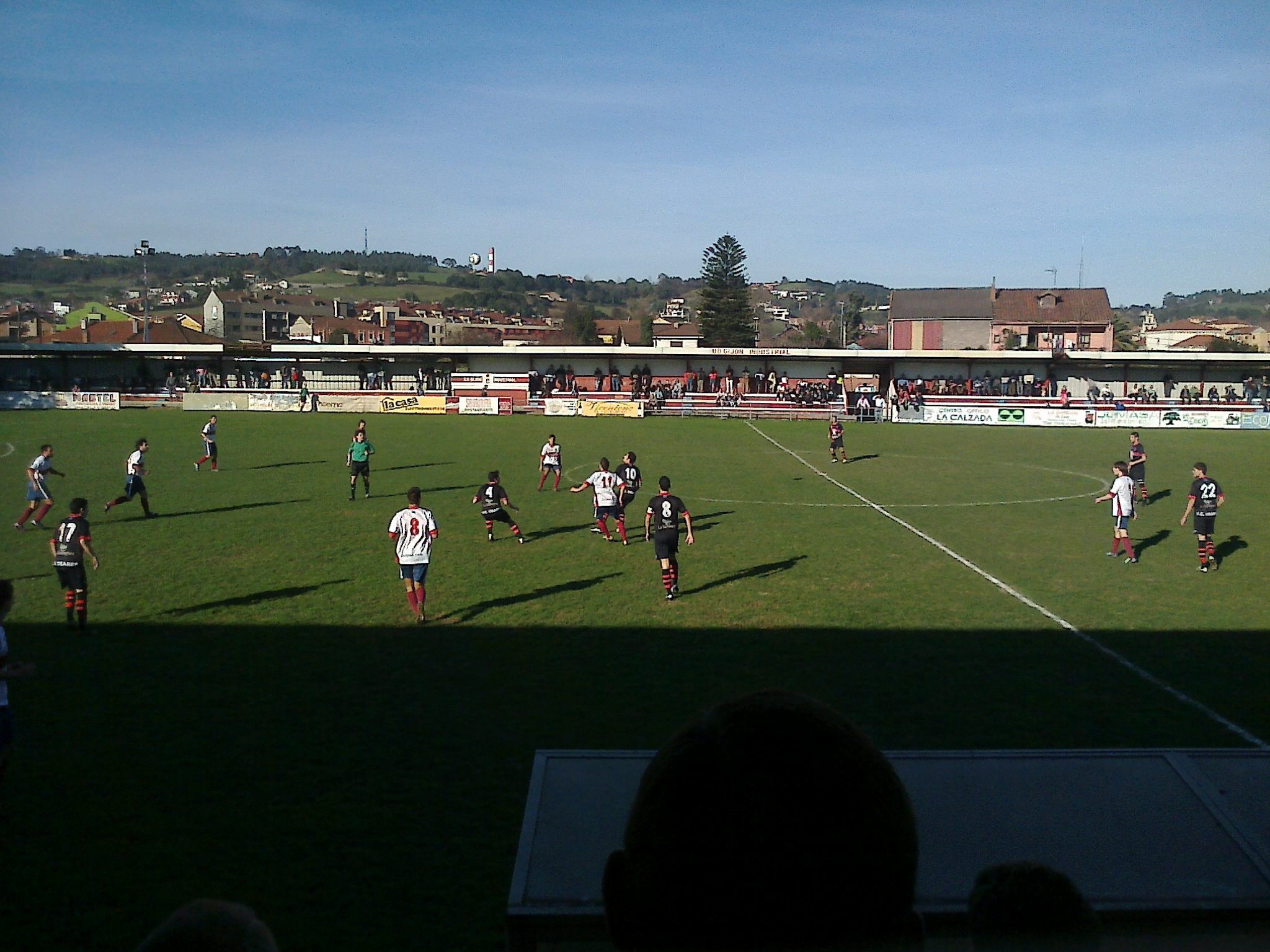
Estadio Santa Cruz, during the 2012 local derby against UC Ceares.

Since its foundation, Gijón Industrial plays its games at Estadio Santa Cruz with a capacity for 3,000 people.

The stadium was inaugurated in 1948 and it was owned by Pelayo CF until its merge with Club Calzada in 1969. In 2016, the Town Hall of Gijón renovated the stadium and changed the pitch to one made of artificial turf.

== Season to season ==
Season	Tier	Division	Pos	Pld	W	D	L	GF	GA	Pts	Copa del Rey	Copa Federación
1969–70	3	3ª	12th	38	12	13	13	38	44	37		
1970–71	4	1ª Reg.	4th	36	14	12	10	58	38	40		
1971–72	4	1ª Reg.	8th	38	19	4	15	76	47	42		
1972–73	4	1ª Reg.	2nd	38	24	8	6	78	36	56		
1972–73	4	PO	W	2	1	1	0	3	2			
1973–74	3	3ª	19th	38	9	9	20	31	67	27	First round	
1974–75	4	1ª Reg.	3rd	38	23	10	5	65	32	56		
1975–76	4	1ª Reg.	7th	38	15	13	10	60	34	43		
1976–77	4	1ª Reg.	3rd	38	22	9	7	69	37	53		
1977–78	4	3ª	3rd	38	15	14	9	55	45	44	First round	
1978–79	4	3ª	11th	38	13	12	13	38	46	38	First round	
1979–80	4	3ª	17th	38	12	8	18	49	55	32	First round	
1980–81	4	3ª	5th	38	17	10	11	56	39	44		
1981–82	4	3ª	19th	38	5	11	22	33	67	21	First round	
1982–83	5	Reg. Pref.	3rd	38	17	12	9	74	42	46		
1983–84	5	Reg. Pref.	9th	38	19	6	13	57	47	44		
1984–85	5	Reg. Pref.	7th	38	16	11	11	72	50	43		
1985–86	5	Reg. Pref.	15th	38	12	11	15	49	59	35		
1986–87	5	Reg. Pref.	7th	38	18	9	11	58	34	45		
1987–88	5	Reg. Pref.	5th	38	17	12	9	54	37	46		
1988–89	5	Reg. Pref.	4th	38	24	8	6	62	29	56		
1989–90	5	Reg. Pref.	3rd	38	21	9	8	61	33	51		
1990–91	4	3ª	12th	38	11	13	14	48	49	35		
1991–92	4	3ª	8th	38	12	15	11	32	36	39		
1992–93	4	3ª	13th	38	9	14	15	48	45	32		
1993–94	4	3ª	8th	38	13	15	10	40	30	41		
1994–95	4	3ª	13th	38	14	6	18	59	63	34		Quarter-finals
1995–96	4	3ª	7th	38	17	9	12	45	38	60		
1996–97	4	3ª	13th	38	11	10	17	44	56	43		First round
1997–98	4	3ª	14th	38	12	9	17	51	53	45		
1998–99	4	3ª	13th	38	13	8	17	49	58	47		
1999–2000	4	3ª	18th	38	10	12	16	35	52	42		
2000–01	5	Reg. Pref.	5th	38	21	7	10	60	34	70		
2001–02	5	Reg. Pref.	2nd	38	23	11	4	68	28	80		
2002–03	4	3ª	7th	38	16	13	9	46	36	61		
2003–04	4	3ª	11th	38	14	8	16	40	57	50		Group stage
2004–05	4	3ª	14th	38	12	8	18	39	65	44		Group stage
2005–06	4	3ª	14th	38	10	13	15	46	47	43		
2006–07	4	3ª	17th	38	9	11	18	42	67	38		
2007–08	5	Reg. Pref.	3rd	38	19	7	12	52	37	64		
2008–09	4	3ª	8th	38	14	9	15	46	65	51		
2009–10	4	3ª	15th	38	10	9	19	37	65	39		Group stage
2010–11	4	3ª	17th	38	9	10	19	34	50	37		
2011–12	4	3ª	13th	38	11	12	15	35	52	45		
2012–13	4	3ª	15th	38	10	13	15	35	42	43		
2013–14	4	3ª	16th	38	9	9	20	21	50	36		
2014–15	4	3ª	14th	38	12	10	16	42	50	46		
2015–16	4	3ª	18th	38	6	13	19	34	68	31		
2016–17	5	Reg. Pref.	2nd	38	18	17	3	65	33	71		
2017–18	4	3ª	12th	38	13	8	17	52	55	47		
2018–19	4	3ª	17th	38	9	8	21	38	64	35		
2019–20	4	3ª	8th	28	10	9	9	42	36	39		
2020–21	4	3ª	9th	26	10	6	10	42	34	36		Quarter-finals
2021–22	5	3ª RFEF	13th	38	12	11	15	53	52	47		Group stage
2022–23	6	1ª RFFPA	2nd	38	20	13	5	58	27	73		
2023–24	5	3ª Fed.	16th	34	7	9	18	36	67	30		
2024–25	6	1ª Astur.	5th	38	20	6	12	60	46	66		
2025–26	5	3ª Fed.	14th	34	7	11	16	36	57	32		
2026–27	5	3ª Fed.										

- 34 seasons in Tercera División
- 4 seasons in Tercera Federación/Tercera División RFEF

== Famous coaches ==
- (Argentina) Enzo Ferrero
- (Equatorial Guinea) Nené Ballina
