= Club Siero =

Association football club in Spain

Siero
- Full name: Club Siero
- Founded: 16 March 1916; 110 years ago
- Ground: El Bayu, Pola de Siero, Asturias, Spain
- Capacity: 5,000
- Chairman: José Manuel Laruelo
- Manager: Aníbal López
- League: Tercera Federación – Group 2
- 2025–26: Tercera Federación – Group 2, 10th of 18
Home colours	Away colours

Club Siero is a Spanish football team based in Pola de Siero, in the autonomous community of Asturias. Founded in 1916, it plays in Tercera Federación – Group 2, holding home matches at Estadio El Bayu, with a capacity of 5,000 seats.

== History ==
Despite being football present in Siero since 1909, Club Siero was not founded until 16 March 1916 with the name of Siero Foot-Ball Club. With the creation of the Spanish football league system the club started playing in Tercera División at Estadio Luis Miranda.

Siero played three editions Copa del Rey, playing against La Liga teams like CA Osasuna or Sporting de Gijón. The club also qualified several times to the promotion play-offs to Segunda División B, but did not promote until 2000. It only played in the third tier during the 2000–01 season, where it was relegated after finishing in the 17th place of the Group 1.

Since its relegation, it is playing in Tercera División and Regional Preferente.

== Season to season ==
Season	Tier	Division	Place	Copa del Rey
1929–1940		Regional	—	
1940–41	4	2ª Reg.	2nd	
1941–42	3	1ª Reg.	8th	
1942–43	4	1ª Reg.	6th	
1943–44	4	1ª Reg.	3rd	
1944–45	4	1ª Reg.	3rd	
1945–46	4	1ª Reg.		
1946–47	4	1ª Reg.	2nd	
1947–48	4	1ª Reg.	7th	
1948–49	4	1ª Reg.	9th	
1949–50	4	1ª Reg.	8th	
1950–51	4	1ª Reg.	12th	
1951–52	4	1ª Reg.	6th	
1952–53	5	2ª Reg.		
1953–54	4	1ª Reg.	5th	
1954–55	4	1ª Reg.	3rd	
1955–56	4	1ª Reg.	7th	
1956–57	4	1ª Reg.	3rd	
1957–58	3	3ª	5th	
1958–59	3	3ª	12th	

Season	Tier	Division	Place	Copa del Rey
1959–60	3	3ª	11th	
1960–61	3	3ª	5th	
1961–62	3	3ª	9th	
1962–63	3	3ª	6th	
1963–64	3	3ª	9th	
1964–65	3	3ª	11th	
1965–66	3	3ª	13th	
1966–67	3	3ª	13th	
1967–68	3	3ª	12th	
1968–69	4	1ª Reg.	1st	
1969–70	4	1ª Reg.	1st	
1970–71	3	3ª	15th	
1971–72	4	1ª Reg.	1st	
1972–73	3	3ª	19th	
1973–74	4	Reg. Pref.	3rd	
1974–75	4	Reg. Pref.	1st	
1975–76	3	3ª	19th	First round
1976–77	4	Reg. Pref.	1st	
1977–78	4	3ª	8th	
1978–79	4	3ª	19th	

Season	Tier	Division	Place	Copa del Rey
1979–80	4	3ª	13th	
1980–81	4	3ª	10th	
1981–82	4	3ª	2nd	
1982–83	4	3ª	11th	First round
1983–84	4	3ª	2nd	
1984–85	4	3ª	1st	First round
1985–86	4	3ª	7th	Second round
1986–87	4	3ª	5th	
1987–88	4	3ª	12th	First round
1988–89	4	3ª	17th	
1989–90	4	3ª	6th	
1990–91	4	3ª	16th	Third round
1991–92	4	3ª	13th	
1992–93	4	3ª	4th	
1993–94	4	3ª	2nd	Second round
1994–95	4	3ª	2nd	
1995–96	4	3ª	12th	
1996–97	4	3ª	1st	
1997–98	4	3ª	4th	
1998–99	4	3ª	2nd	

Season	Tier	Division	Place	Copa del Rey
1999–2000	4	3ª	2nd	
2000–01	3	2ª B	17th	
2001–02	4	3ª	3rd	
2002–03	4	3ª	9th	
2003–04	4	3ª	14th	
2004–05	4	3ª	10th	
2005–06	4	3ª	11th	
2006–07	4	3ª	10th	
2007–08	4	3ª	14th	
2008–09	4	3ª	19th	
2009–10	5	Reg. Pref.	17th	
2010–11	5	Reg. Pref.	14th	
2011–12	5	Reg. Pref.	6th	
2012–13	5	Reg. Pref.	12th	
2013–14	5	Reg. Pref.	9th	
2014–15	5	Reg. Pref.	1st	
2015–16	4	3ª	16th	
2016–17	4	3ª	16th	
2017–18	4	3ª	16th	
2018–19	4	3ª	16th	

Season	Tier	Division	Place	Copa del Rey
2019–20	4	3ª	20th	
2020–21	4	3ª	9th / 8th	
2021–22	6	Reg. Pref.	10th	
2022–23	7	2ª RFFPA	1st	
2023–24	6	1ª Astur.	6th	
2024–25	6	1ª Astur.	2nd	
2025–26	5	3ª Fed.	10th	
2026–27	5	3ª Fed.		

- 1 season in Segunda División B
- 51 seasons in Tercera División
- 2 seasons in Tercera Federación

== Honours ==
- Tercera División: 1984–85, 1996–97
- Copa RFEF (Asturias tournament): 1994
