= Candás CF =

Candás
- Full name: Candás Club de Fútbol
- Nickname: El Canijo
- Founded: 1948; 78 years ago
- Stadium: Estadio La Mata
- Capacity: 3,000
- President: Valeriano Rodríguez Vega
- Head coach: Iván Nuevo
- League: Primera Asturfútbol
- 2025–26: Segunda Asturfútbol – Group 1, 5th of 18 (promoted via play-offs)
Home colours	Away colours

Candás Club de Fútbol is a Spanish football team based in Candás, in the autonomous community of Asturias. Founded in 1948, it plays in Primera Asturfútbol, holding home games at Estadio La Mata, which has a capacity of 3,000 spectators.

== Season to season ==
Season	Level	Division	Place	Copa del Rey
1948–49	5	2ª Reg.		
1949–50	5	2ª Reg.		
1950–51	5	3ª Reg.		
1951–52	5	3ª Reg.		
1952–53	4	1ª Reg.	8th	
1953–54	5	2ª Reg.		
1954–55	5	2ª Reg.		
1955–56	5	2ª Reg.		
1956–57	5	2ª Reg.		
1957–58	4	1ª Reg.	3rd	
1958–59	4	1ª Reg.	13th	
1959–60	4	1ª Reg.	7th	
1960–61	4	1ª Reg.	3rd	
1961–62	3	3ª	11th	
1962–63	3	3ª	14th	
1963–64	3	3ª	8th	
1964–65	3	3ª	10th	
1965–66	3	3ª	4th	
1966–67	3	3ª	3rd	
1967–68	3	3ª	3rd	

Season	Level	Division	Place	Copa del Rey
1968–69	3	3ª	8th	
1969–70	3	3ª	8th	
1970–71	3	3ª	13th	
1971–72	3	3ª	20th	First round
1972–73	4	1ª Reg.	12th	
1973–74	4	Reg. Pref.	8th	
1974–75	4	Reg. Pref.	6th	
1975–76	4	Reg. Pref.	13th	
1976–77	4	Reg. Pref.	13th	
1977–78	5	Reg. Pref.	5th	
1978–79	5	Reg. Pref.	8th	
1979–80	5	Reg. Pref.	6th	
1980–81	5	Reg. Pref.	16th	
1981–82	5	Reg. Pref.	17th	
1982–83	6	1ª Reg.	4th	
1983–84	6	1ª Reg.	3rd	
1984–85	5	Reg. Pref.	18th	
1985–86	6	1ª Reg.	2nd	
1986–87	5	Reg. Pref.	9th	
1987–88	5	Reg. Pref.	15th	

Season	Level	Division	Place	Copa del Rey
1988–89	5	Reg. Pref.	7th	
1989–90	5	Reg. Pref.	1st	
1990–91	4	3ª	14th	
1991–92	4	3ª	11th	
1992–93	4	3ª	8th	
1993–94	4	3ª	9th	
1994–95	4	3ª	18th	
1995–96	5	Reg. Pref.	4th	
1996–97	4	3ª	15th	
1997–98	4	3ª	11th	
1998–99	4	3ª	17th	
1999–2000	5	Reg. Pref.	14th	
2000–01	5	Reg. Pref.	20th	
2001–02	6	1ª Reg.	2nd	
2002–03	5	Reg. Pref.	10th	
2003–04	5	Reg. Pref.	15th	
2004–05	5	Reg. Pref.	18th	
2005–06	6	1ª Reg.	2nd	
2006–07	5	Reg. Pref.	3rd	
2007–08	4	3ª	16th	

Season	Level	Division	Place	Copa del Rey
2008–09	4	3ª	3rd	
2009–10	4	3ª	8th	
2010–11	4	3ª	5th	
2011–12	4	3ª	6th	
2012–13	4	3ª	16th	
2013–14	4	3ª	18th	
2014–15	5	Reg. Pref.	10th	
2015–16	5	Reg. Pref.	13th	
2016–17	5	Reg. Pref.	16th	
2017–18	5	Reg. Pref.	15th	
2018–19	5	Reg. Pref.	13th	
2019–20	5	Reg. Pref.	9th	
2020–21	5	Reg. Pref.	7th	
2021–22	6	Reg. Pref.	6th	
2022–23	6	1ª RFFPA	9th	
2023–24	6	1ª Astur.	11th	
2024–25	6	1ª Astur.	18th	
2025–26	7	2ª Astur.		

- 24 seasons in Tercera División

== Honours ==
- Copa RFEF (Asturias tournament): 2010
