= Josu Uribe =

Spanish football manager (born 1969)

Personal information
- Full name: Jesús Uribesalgo Gutiérrez
- Date of birth: 25 May 1969 (age 57)
- Place of birth: Gijón, Spain

Team information
- Current team: Beroe Stara Zagora

Managerial career
- Years: Team
- 1993–1994: Lealtad
- 1994–1996: Rey Aurelio
- 1996–1997: Titánico
- 1997–1998: Astur
- 2000–2002: Ribadesella
- 2002–2003: Las Palmas
- 2003–2004: Getafe
- 2004–2006: Elche
- 2006–2007: Hércules
- 2007–2008: Alavés
- 2009: Ribadesella
- 2009: Eibar
- 2009–2010: Cultural Leonesa
- 2011: Panserraikos
- 2012: Girona
- 2013–2015: Avilés
- 2016: Mensajero
- 2016–2017: Melilla
- 2017–2018: Caudal
- 2019–2020: Xerez Deportivo
- 2020–2021: Lanzarote
- 2022–2023: Mensajero
- 2024–2025: Beroe Stara Zagora
- 2025–: Beroe Stara Zagora

Jesús Uribesalgo Gutiérrez (born 25 May 1969), commonly known as Josu Uribe, is a Spanish football manager.

== Career ==
Born in Gijón, Asturias, Uribe began coaching at the age of 21, managing youth sides at local Sporting de Gijón. Subsequently, he coached in amateur senior football, his first achievement being leading Ribadesella CF to the third division in the 2001–02 season, a first-ever for the club.

As a result, Uribe moved straight into the second level with UD Las Palmas. In the 2003–04 campaign he was in charge of Getafe CF as they reached La Liga for the first time in their history, finishing in second position behind champions Levante UD and only losing six games in 42.

From 2004 to 2009, Uribe continued working in division two, with Elche CF, Hércules CF, Deportivo Alavés and SD Eibar, being relegated with the latter after 15 matches in charge. He spent 2009–10 with Cultural y Deportiva Leonesa, in the third tier.

In 2011, Uribe had a fleeting spell in Greek football, leaving Panserraikos F.C. after a few months due to the club's economic problems. In January 2012 he was appointed at Girona FC after the sacking of Raül Agné, with the Catalans ranking in 21st position (ouf of 22 teams) but eventually avoiding second-division relegation.

== Personal life ==
His father Jesús Uribe (1938–2005) was a footballer whose teams included Alavés, Levante UD and Sporting Gijón.

== Managerial statistics ==
As of 25 July 2020

Managerial record by team and tenure
Team	Nat	From	To	Record								Ref
Team	Nat	From	To	G	W	D	L	GF	GA	GD	Win %	Ref
Lealtad	(Spain)	1 July 1993	30 June 1994	48	24	14	10	69	41	+28	50.00	
Rey Aurelio	(Spain)	30 June 1994	29 May 1996	76	28	24	24	74	79	−5	36.84	
Titánico	(Spain)	29 May 1996	30 June 1997	38	11	14	13	55	42	+13	28.95	
Astur	(Spain)	30 June 1997	31 December 1998	55	30	14	11	82	49	+33	54.55	—
Ribadesella	(Spain)	3 December 2000	12 July 2002	67	29	25	13	92	64	+28	43.28	—
Las Palmas	(Spain)	12 July 2002	30 June 2003	43	16	16	11	54	45	+9	37.21	
Getafe	(Spain)	30 June 2003	1 July 2004	43	20	16	7	56	40	+16	46.51	
Elche	(Spain)	1 July 2004	30 January 2006	69	27	16	26	86	89	−3	39.13	
Hércules	(Spain)	11 October 2006	14 May 2007	32	10	12	10	38	39	−1	31.25	
Alavés	(Spain)	1 July 2007	19 February 2008	27	8	7	12	27	32	−5	29.63	
Ribadesella	(Spain)	25 February 2009	10 March 2009	2	1	1	0	4	3	+1	50.00	—
Eibar	(Spain)	10 March 2009	30 June 2009	15	1	5	9	11	26	−15	6.67	
Cultural Leonesa	(Spain)	24 July 2009	30 June 2010	43	13	15	15	52	58	−6	30.23	
Panserraikos	(Greece)	1 July 2011	10 October 2011	0	0	0	0	0	0	+0	—	—
Girona	(Spain)	16 January 2012	25 March 2012	10	2	2	6	12	14	−2	20.00	
Avilés	(Spain)	1 July 2013	8 March 2015	70	29	20	21	85	67	+18	41.43	
Mensajero	(Spain)	12 January 2016	5 July 2016	18	9	2	7	24	17	+7	50.00	
Melilla	(Spain)	5 July 2016	15 March 2017	29	10	15	4	29	18	+11	34.48	
Caudal	(Spain)	22 November 2017	15 May 2018	23	1	6	16	13	33	−20	4.35	
Xerez Deportivo	(Spain)	7 November 2019	25 July 2020	14	7	2	5	16	13	+3	50.00	
Total				722	276	226	220	879	769	+110	38.23	—
