= Jorge Sáez =

Spanish footballer

Personal information
- Full name: Jorge Sáez Carrillo
- Date of birth: 5 May 1990 (age 36)
- Place of birth: Madrid, Spain
- Height: 1.75 m (5 ft 9 in)
- Position: Midfielder

Team information
- Current team: Lealtad
- Number: 14

Youth career
- 1999–2008: Rayo Vallecano

Senior career*
Years	Team	Apps	(Gls)
2008–2013	Rayo B	120	(7)
2009	Rayo Vallecano	3	(0)
2013–2014	Getafe B	33	(1)
2014–2015	Burgos	15	(0)
2015–2016	Real Avilés	27	(2)
2016–2019	Bergantiños	111	(15)
2019–2020	Arosa	24	(2)
2020–	Lealtad	15	(0)

International career
2008	Spain U19	3	(0)
- * Club domestic league appearances and goals as of 21 March 2021

Jorge Sáez Carrillo (born 5 May 1990) is a Spanish footballer who plays for CD Lealtad mainly as a midfielder.

== Club career ==
Born in Madrid, Sáez spent his youth career with local Rayo Vallecano, and made his senior debuts with the reserve team in the 2008–09 season, in the Tercera División. On 24 May 2009 he appeared in his first official game with the main squad, featuring the last ten minutes of the 1–2 home defeat against Elche CF in the Segunda División; he finished the campaign with a further two league appearances, all as a substitute.

On 16 June 2013 Sáez signed a contract with Getafe CF, being assigned to the B-side in Segunda División B. On 12 August of the following year, he moved to fellow league team Burgos CF.
