= Stephen Buer =

Ghanaian footballer (born 1999)

Personal information
- Date of birth: 16 January 1999 (age 27)
- Place of birth: Accra, Ghana
- Height: 1.82 m (6 ft 0 in)
- Position: Midfielder

Team information
- Current team: Lealtad
- Number: 20

Youth career
- Leganés

Senior career*
| Years | Team | Apps | (Gls) |
| 2018–2019 | Internacional Madrid | 1 | (0) |
| 2019 | Leganés B | 1 | (0) |
| 2019–2021 | Paracuellos Antamira | 23 | (1) |
| 2021 | Fuenlabrada B | 9 | (0) |
| 2021–2023 | Fuenlabrada Promesas | 26 | (3) |
| 2021–2024 | Fuenlabrada | 49 | (0) |
| 2025 | Badalona Futur | 8 | (0) |
| 2025– | Lealtad | 16 | (0) |
- * Club domestic league appearances and goals as of 25 February 2026

Stephen Buer (born 16 January 1999) is a Ghanaian footballer who plays as a midfielder for Spanish Segunda Federación club Lealtad.

== Club career ==
Born in Accra, Buer finished his formation with Spanish side CD Leganés before signing for Segunda División B side Internacional de Madrid in the 2018 summer. On 7 February of the following year, he returned to Lega and was assigned to the reserves in the Tercera División.

On 17 August 2019, after appearing in just 21 minutes for the Pepineros, Buer joined Fútbol Alcobendas Sport also in the fourth division. In 2021, he moved to CF Fuenlabrada and was assigned to the B-team in the regional leagues.

Buer made his first-team debut for Fuenla on 15 August 2021, coming on as a late substitute for Cristóbal Márquez in a 1–2 home loss against CD Tenerife in the Segunda División. On 21 January 2023, he renewed his contract until 2025, being definitely promoted to the main squad now in Primera Federación.

On 23 August 2024, he left Fuenlabrada by mutual consent.
