= Paco Fernández =

Spanish footballer and coach

Personal information
- Full name: Francisco Fernández Gómez
- Date of birth: 28 September 1967 (age 59)
- Place of birth: Oviedo, Spain
- Height: 1.80 m (5 ft 11 in)
- Position: Midfielder

Team information
- Current team: Oviedo (youth manager)

Youth career
- Oviedo

Senior career*
Years	Team	Apps	(Gls)
1984–1987	Oviedo B	108	(28)
1985–1993	Oviedo	56	(3)
1993–1994	Logroñés	11	(1)
1994–1996	Badajoz	59	(1)
1996–1997	Pontevedra	41	(8)
1997–1998	Gimnástica	24	(3)
1998–2000	Caudal	63	(6)
2000–2001	Lealtad	26	(9)
Total		388	(59)

Managerial career
- 2003–2005: Berrón
- 2005–2007: Lealtad
- 2007–2008: Langreo
- 2009: Avilés
- 2009–2013: Caudal
- 2013–2015: Racing Santander
- 2016: Burgos
- 2017: Caudal
- 2021–: Oviedo (youth)
- * Club domestic league appearances and goals

Francisco "Paco" Fernández Gómez (born 25 October 1967) is a Spanish retired footballer who played as a midfielder, and the current coach of Real Oviedo's Juvenil A squad.

== Playing career ==
Born in Oviedo, Asturias, Fernández made his professional debut with local Real Oviedo on 3 March 1985, playing the last ten minutes and scoring in an 8–0 home routing against CF Lorca Deportiva in the Segunda División. He appeared with the club in La Liga in the following seasons, which included two matches in the 1991–92 UEFA Cup.

In the 1994 summer Fernández joined CD Logroñés, also in the first division. After two years with CD Badajoz in the second level he competed in the lower leagues, representing Pontevedra CF, Gimnástica de Torrelavega, Caudal Deportivo and CD Lealtad; he retired at the end of the 2000–01 campaign with the last side, aged 34.

== Manager career ==
After retiring Fernández began working as a coach, his first stop being amateurs Berrón CF. Afterwards he managed Lealtad, UP Langreo, and Real Avilés, always in his native region.

In May 2009 Fernández signed with another club he had represented as a player, Caudal in division four. He achieved promotion to the third division in 2010 and 2012, and also appeared in the promotion play-offs to the second tier in 2013.

On 12 July 2013 Fernández was appointed Racing de Santander manager. He led the third level club to the quarterfinals of the Copa del Rey in his first year, in spite of a severe institutional and financial crisis.

On 3 March 2015 Fernández was sacked, with the club in the relegation zone.

On 1 July 2016, Fernández signed as Burgos CF head coach. On 26 September, he was sacked after only earning one point in the first six league games.

On 27 May 2017, Fernández agreed terms with Caudal Deportivo for taking again the helm of the team four years after leaving Mieres. However, he resigned on 19 November 2017, after only earning 10 points in 15 matches.

== Managerial statistics ==
As of 19 November 2017

Managerial record by team and tenure
Team	Nat	From	To	Record								Ref
Team	Nat	From	To	G	W	D	L	GF	GA	GD	Win %	Ref
Lealtad	(Spain)	1 July 2006	30 June 2007	40	25	8	7	72	39	+33	62.50	
Langreo	(Spain)	1 July 2007	30 June 2008	40	22	7	11	61	41	+20	55.00	
Avilés	(Spain)	4 February 2009	28 May 2009	16	5	5	6	21	23	−2	31.25	
Caudal	(Spain)	28 May 2009	12 July 2013	166	88	34	44	260	135	+125	53.01	
Racing Santander	(Spain)	12 July 2013	3 March 2015	74	27	26	21	95	71	+24	36.49	
Burgos	(Spain)	1 July 2016	26 September 2016	7	0	1	6	6	13	−7	0.00	
Caudal	(Spain)	27 May 2017	19 November 2017	15	2	4	9	6	21	−15	13.33	
Total				358	169	85	104	521	343	+178	47.21	—
