= Ribadesella CF =

Ribadesella
- Full name: Ribadesella Club de Fútbol
- Founded: 1949
- Ground: Oreyana, Ribadesella, Asturias, Spain
- Capacity: 3,500
- Chairman: (Spain) Juan Luis del Valle
- Manager: (Spain) Nené Ballina
- League: Primera Asturfútbol
- 2025–26: Primera Asturfútbol, 5th of 19
Home colours	Away colours

Ribadesella Club de Fútbol is a Spanish football team based in Ribadesella, in the autonomous community of Asturias. Founded in 1949, it plays in Primera Asturfútbol, holding home games at Estadio Oreyana, with a capacity of 3,500 seats.

== History ==
Founded in 1949, Ribadesella always played in the regional divisions until 1988, when the club was promoted for the first time to Tercera División after finishing in third position in the Regional Preferente.

Fourteen years later, the club achieved promotion to Segunda División B after qualifying for the first time for the promotion play-offs. Ribadesella topped its group over San Sebastián de los Reyes, Betanzos CF and Gimnástica Segoviana.

The club only remained one season in the third tier before being relegated again to Tercera División, where it played eight more years before suffering two relegations in two years. Ribadesella came back to Regional Preferente in 2016, after spending four seasons in the sixth tier and leaving a high economic debt.

== Season to season ==
Season	Level	Division	Place	Copa del Rey
1949–1957		Regional	—	
1957–58	5	2ª Reg.	2nd	
1958–59	4	1ª Reg.	15th	
1959–60	4	1ª Reg.	14th	
1960–61	4	1ª Reg.	13th	
1961–62	4	1ª Reg.	11th	
1962–63	4	1ª Reg.	6th	
1963–64	4	1ª Reg.	16th	
1964–65	5	2ª Reg.		
1965–66	5	2ª Reg.		
1966–67	5	2ª Reg.		
1967–68	5	2ª Reg.		
1968–69	5	2ª Reg.		
1969–70	5	2ª Reg.		
1970–71	5	2ª Reg.		
1971–72	5	2ª Reg.		
1972–73	5	2ª Reg.		
1973–74	6	2ª Reg.		
1974–75	6	2ª Reg.	1st	
1975–76	6	2ª Reg.	1st	

Season	Level	Division	Place	Copa del Rey
1976–77	6	2ª Reg.	1st	
1977–78	6	2ª Reg. P.	1st	
1978–79	5	Reg. Pref.	15th	
1979–80	5	Reg. Pref.	8th	
1980–81	5	Reg. Pref.	12th	
1981–82	5	Reg. Pref.	4th	
1982–83	5	Reg. Pref.	12th	
1983–84	5	Reg. Pref.	4th	
1984–85	5	Reg. Pref.	4th	
1985–86	5	Reg. Pref.	10th	
1986–87	5	Reg. Pref.	4th	
1987–88	5	Reg. Pref.	3rd	
1988–89	4	3ª	9th	
1989–90	4	3ª	8th	
1990–91	4	3ª	15th	
1991–92	4	3ª	12th	
1992–93	4	3ª	16th	
1993–94	4	3ª	11th	
1994–95	4	3ª	14th	
1995–96	4	3ª	10th	

Season	Level	Division	Place	Copa del Rey
1996–97	4	3ª	11th	
1997–98	4	3ª	12th	
1998–99	4	3ª	10th	
1999–2000	4	3ª	14th	
2000–01	4	3ª	15th	
2001–02	4	3ª	4th	
2002–03	3	2ª B	20th	
2003–04	4	3ª	9th	
2004–05	4	3ª	2nd	
2005–06	4	3ª	3rd	
2006–07	4	3ª	7th	
2007–08	4	3ª	9th	
2008–09	4	3ª	14th	
2009–10	4	3ª	6th	
2010–11	4	3ª	19th	
2011–12	5	Reg. Pref.	18th	
2012–13	6	1ª Reg.	15th	
2013–14	6	1ª Reg.	11th	
2014–15	6	1ª Reg.	6th	
2015–16	6	1ª Reg.	1st	

Season	Level	Division	Place	Copa del Rey
2016–17	5	Reg. Pref.	8th	
2017–18	5	Reg. Pref.	4th	
2018–19	5	Reg. Pref.	19th	
2019–20	6	1ª Reg.	2nd	
2020–21	5	Reg. Pref.	20th	
2021–22	7	1ª Reg.	2nd	
2022–23	7	2ª RFFPA	11th	
2023–24	7	2ª Astur.	8th	
2024–25	7	2ª Astur.	2nd	
2025–26	6	1ª Astur.		

- 1 season in Segunda División B
- 22 seasons in Tercera División

== Notable former coaches ==
- (Equatorial Guinea) Nené Ballina
- (Spain) Josu Uribe
