= 2002–03 Tercera División =

Season of football team

Tercera División
- Season: 2002–03
- Dates: August 2002–June 2003
- Matches: 12,920

The 2002-03 Tercera División season ran from August 2002 to June 2003. The promotion play-off finals were held in June 2003.

== Group I ==
Pos	Team	Pld	W	D	L	GF	GA	GD	Pts
1	CCD Cerceda	38	21	11	6	77	35	+42	74
2	R.C. Dep. Coruña B	38	21	10	7	66	40	+26	73
3	C. At. Arteixo	38	19	11	8	54	33	+21	68
4	C. Rápido Bouzas	38	20	7	11	64	41	+23	67
5	CD Lalín	38	16	18	4	56	37	+19	66
6	SD Compostela B	38	15	9	14	55	51	+4	54
7	UD Xove Lago	38	12	15	11	42	43	−1	51
8	Ponte Ourense CF	38	13	12	13	44	51	−7	51
9	CD Grove	38	11	15	12	47	55	−8	48
10	Verín CF	38	13	9	16	40	45	−5	48
11	Arousa SC	38	13	7	18	45	61	−16	46
12	C. Sporting Guardés	38	11	12	15	38	54	−16	45
13	Feiraco SD Negreira	38	11	11	16	41	46	−5	44
14	Betanzos CF	38	11	11	16	45	52	−7	44
15	Bergantiños CF	38	9	17	12	31	39	−8	44
16	Portonovo SD	38	11	11	16	44	59	−15	44
17	Alondras CF (R)	38	10	13	15	43	52	−9	43
18	Racing Club Villalbés (R)	38	9	15	14	34	37	−3	42
19	Viveiro CF (R)	38	10	9	19	47	61	−14	39
20	Club Lemos (R)	38	5	15	18	36	57	−21	30

Source: Fútbol Regional
(R) Relegated

== Group II ==
Pos	Team	Pld	W	D	L	GF	GA	GD	Pts
1	Caudal Deportivo (P)	38	25	10	3	59	17	+42	85
2	Real Titánico	38	23	12	3	71	26	+45	81
3	Sporting de Gijón B	38	22	11	5	71	28	+43	77
4	Real Oviedo B	38	22	9	7	67	26	+41	75
5	Univ. Oviedo	38	20	10	8	71	34	+37	70
6	CD Lealtad	38	17	13	8	68	34	+34	64
7	Gijón Ind.	38	16	13	9	46	36	+10	61
8	Astur CF	38	18	7	13	52	34	+18	61
9	Siero	38	15	12	11	54	47	+7	57
10	CD Llanes	38	14	11	13	47	36	+11	53
11	Hispano	38	14	10	14	47	49	−2	52
12	Condal	38	12	9	17	50	61	−11	45
13	Navia CF	38	11	12	15	44	61	−17	45
14	CD Mosconia	38	9	14	15	37	45	−8	41
15	Pumarín CF	38	11	6	21	39	67	−28	39
16	CD Covadonga (R)	38	8	11	19	33	55	−22	35
17	Narcea (R)	38	8	8	22	34	71	−37	32
18	Navarro (R)	38	6	14	18	42	57	−15	32
19	SD Colloto (R)	38	7	4	27	29	89	−60	25
20	CD Turón (R)	38	2	4	32	23	111	−88	10

Source: Fútbol Regional
(P) Promoted; (R) Relegated

== Group III ==
Pos	Team	Pld	W	D	L	GF	GA	GD	Pts
1	Velarde CF	38	28	5	5	73	28	+45	89
2	SD Barreda Balompié	38	22	12	4	51	14	+37	78
3	Tropezón	38	20	16	2	53	25	+28	76
4	Reocín	38	21	7	10	80	38	+42	70
5	CD Bezana	38	20	10	8	63	39	+24	70
6	Castro CF	38	18	7	13	59	56	+3	61
7	CD Laredo	38	16	10	12	63	47	+16	58
8	CF Ribamontán	38	15	13	10	65	39	+26	58
9	SD Rayo Cantabria	38	14	9	15	39	37	+2	51
10	Escobedo	38	12	13	13	51	55	−4	49
11	Pontejos	38	12	10	16	42	51	−9	46
12	Vimenor	38	12	10	16	40	48	−8	46
13	SD Textil Escudo	38	13	6	19	45	59	−14	45
14	CA Deva	38	10	14	14	41	45	−4	44
15	CD Cayón	38	11	10	17	33	48	−15	43
16	SD Atlético Albericia	38	11	10	17	42	51	−9	43
17	Minerva (R)	38	10	7	21	42	64	−22	37
18	Toranzo (R)	38	10	5	23	36	73	−37	35
19	SD Revilla (R)	38	8	6	24	39	73	−34	30
20	CD Naval (R)	38	4	6	28	29	96	−67	18

Source: Fútbol Regional
(R) Relegated

== Group IV ==
Pos	Team	Pld	W	D	L	GF	GA	GD	Pts
1	CD Basconia	38	20	11	7	56	34	+22	71
2	Real Sociedad B (P)	38	19	13	6	64	33	+31	70
3	Zalla UC	38	19	9	10	40	31	+9	66
4	SD Lemona	38	17	11	10	55	31	+24	62
5	SD Indautxu	38	16	13	9	50	29	+21	61
6	SD Beasaín	38	16	13	9	37	31	+6	61
7	CD Lagún Onak	38	17	7	14	47	41	+6	58
8	Sestao River Club	38	15	12	11	46	31	+15	57
9	CD Aurrerá Ondarroa	38	14	10	14	49	47	+2	52
10	Arenas Club de Getxo	38	12	13	13	38	44	−6	49
11	Portugalete	38	13	10	15	50	48	+2	49
12	SD Éibar B	38	12	11	15	42	40	+2	47
13	SD Amorebieta	38	10	17	11	39	43	−4	47
14	Club Bermeo	38	11	13	14	34	41	−7	46
15	Universidad PV	38	12	10	16	33	47	−14	46
16	Deportivo Alavés C	38	11	12	15	31	39	−8	45
17	SCD Durango (R)	38	9	17	12	34	40	−6	44
18	SD San Pedro (R)	38	7	11	20	24	52	−28	32
19	Club San Ignacio (R)	38	7	11	20	30	68	−38	32
20	Aurrerá Vitoria B (R)	38	4	14	20	25	54	−29	26

Source: Fútbol Regional
(P) Promoted; (R) Relegated

== Group V ==
Pos	Team	Pld	W	D	L	GF	GA	GD	Pts
1	Badalona	38	22	9	7	63	36	+27	75
2	Girona FC (P)	38	20	10	8	83	42	+41	70
3	UE Sant Andreu	38	20	8	10	60	44	+16	68
4	Vilanova	38	17	15	6	74	49	+25	66
5	FC Barcelona C	38	17	10	11	57	43	+14	61
6	Castelldefels	38	17	10	11	74	60	+14	61
7	CF Palafrugell	38	16	10	12	51	44	+7	58
8	UE Vilassar	38	15	12	11	69	65	+4	57
9	Gramenet B	38	16	6	16	60	57	+3	54
10	UE Tàrrega	38	14	9	15	57	56	+1	51
11	Granollers	38	13	11	14	56	54	+2	50
12	Peralada	38	12	12	14	57	53	+4	48
13	Manresa	38	12	12	14	49	58	−9	48
14	CD Europa	38	12	9	17	53	63	−10	45
15	AEC Manlleu	38	12	9	17	46	54	−8	45
16	Prat (R)	38	12	7	19	42	67	−25	43
17	CD Tortosa (R)	38	11	7	20	44	76	−32	40
18	Premià (R)	38	7	14	17	41	61	−20	35
19	AD Guíxols (R)	38	9	7	22	44	78	−34	34
20	CF Balaguer (R)	38	8	9	21	43	63	−20	33

Source: Fútbol Regional
(P) Promoted; (R) Relegated

== Group VI ==
Pos	Team	Pld	W	D	L	GF	GA	GD	Pts
1	Benidorm	42	24	11	7	65	30	+35	83
2	Villajoyosa (P)	42	21	11	10	66	34	+32	74
3	CD Onda	42	20	11	11	50	31	+19	71
4	Levante UD B	42	20	11	11	63	40	+23	71
5	CD Alcoyano	42	19	12	11	57	41	+16	69
6	Santa Pola CF	42	18	14	10	53	40	+13	68
7	Pego CF	42	17	12	13	42	46	−4	63
8	Elche CF B	42	18	8	16	66	48	+18	62
9	Torrellano CF	42	18	8	16	54	50	+4	62
10	Gandía	42	16	13	13	51	47	+4	61
11	CD Eldense	42	17	9	16	67	45	+22	60
12	Burjassot CF	42	16	9	17	45	54	−9	57
13	Ontinyent CF	42	14	14	14	51	53	−2	56
14	Valencia CF B	42	13	15	14	44	46	−2	54
15	CD Denia	42	14	10	18	55	65	−10	52
16	CD Castellón B	42	14	10	18	59	56	+3	52
17	Burriana	42	13	13	16	37	44	−7	52
18	Vinaròs CF (R)	42	13	13	16	48	63	−15	52
19	UD Alzira (R)	42	14	9	19	42	52	−10	51
20	Carcaixent (R)	42	8	10	24	46	91	−45	34
21	Juventud (R)	42	6	15	21	37	65	−28	33
22	Puzol (R)	42	6	8	28	33	90	−57	26

Source: Fútbol Regional
(P) Promoted; (R) Relegated

== Group VII ==
Pos	Team	Pld	W	D	L	GF	GA	GD	Pts
1	S.Sebast.Reyes (P)	38	20	12	6	71	38	+33	72
2	CDA Navalcarnero	38	20	12	6	67	43	+24	72
3	Fuenlabrada (P)	38	20	10	8	58	37	+21	70
4	CF Rayo Majadahonda (P)	38	20	9	9	65	42	+23	69
5	Rayo Vallecano B	38	20	8	10	70	51	+19	68
6	Real Madrid CF C	38	18	8	12	65	47	+18	62
7	CD Móstoles	38	16	11	11	61	42	+19	59
8	CD Las Rozas	38	15	13	10	50	35	+15	58
9	CD Leganés B	38	17	5	16	74	59	+15	56
10	CD San Fernando	38	16	7	15	54	56	−2	55
11	Atlético Pinto	38	14	12	12	62	48	+14	54
12	Atlético Aviación	38	14	10	14	51	54	−3	52
13	Orcasitas	38	14	7	17	44	49	−5	49
14	CD Puerta Bonita	38	13	7	18	55	54	+1	46
15	CD Pegaso	38	12	10	16	46	63	−17	46
16	DAV Santa Ana	38	10	11	17	42	56	−14	41
17	Fortuna (R)	38	9	13	16	43	59	−16	40
18	Aravaca (R)	38	10	10	18	51	66	−15	40
19	CD Colonia Moscardó (R)	38	5	10	23	36	69	−33	25
20	Mejoreño (R)	38	2	5	31	25	122	−97	11

Source: Fútbol Regional
(P) Promoted; (R) Relegated

== Group VIII ==
Pos	Team	Pld	W	D	L	GF	GA	GD	Pts
1	CF Palencia (P)	38	21	13	4	66	22	+44	76
2	Prom. Ponferrad	38	21	9	8	52	27	+25	72
3	La Bañeza	38	21	7	10	56	41	+15	70
4	Guijuelo	38	20	8	10	57	30	+27	68
5	Tordesillas	38	21	5	12	50	40	+10	68
6	Valladolid B	38	19	10	9	60	32	+28	67
7	Gimnástica Segoviana CF	38	19	9	10	81	38	+43	66
8	Salamanca B	38	18	9	11	49	35	+14	63
9	CF Norma San Leonardo	38	17	10	11	59	47	+12	61
10	Cultural y Deportiva Leonesa B	38	17	9	12	55	40	+15	60
11	CD Numancia B	38	17	9	12	44	34	+10	60
12	CD Becerril	38	17	5	16	46	55	−9	56
13	CA Bembibre	38	11	13	14	33	45	−12	46
14	Benavente	38	12	10	16	35	43	−8	46
15	Hullera	38	13	5	20	51	59	−8	44
16	Gim. Medinense	38	10	6	22	43	69	−26	36
17	SD Almazán	38	8	8	22	40	71	−31	32
18	Río Vena (R)	38	7	7	24	23	62	−39	28
19	Béjar Ind. (R)	38	5	6	27	26	73	−47	21
20	CD Aguilar (R)	38	2	10	26	23	86	−63	16

Source: Fútbol Regional
(P) Promoted; (R) Relegated

== Group IX ==
Pos	Team	Pld	W	D	L	GF	GA	GD	Pts
1	CP Granada 74	38	23	9	6	58	26	+32	78
2	UD Marbella (P)	38	24	6	8	76	37	+39	78
3	Carolinense	38	19	13	6	58	30	+28	70
4	Granada CF	38	20	10	8	51	35	+16	70
5	AD Comarca de Níjar	38	20	8	10	56	37	+19	68
6	Loja CD	38	18	8	12	47	39	+8	62
7	Guadix CF	38	17	10	11	46	32	+14	61
8	Arenas CD	38	18	5	15	48	35	+13	59
9	UD Almería B	38	16	6	16	61	62	−1	54
10	Atlético Mancha Real	38	13	13	12	32	31	+1	52
11	CD Roquetas	38	13	10	15	52	56	−4	49
12	Vandalia Industrial	38	13	7	18	36	44	−8	46
13	Antequera CF	38	13	7	18	38	46	−8	46
14	CD Baza	38	12	9	17	47	48	−1	45
15	CD Alhaurino	38	11	10	17	42	46	−4	43
16	Martos CD	38	11	8	19	37	54	−17	41
17	Úbeda CF	38	13	2	23	37	68	−31	41
18	Vélez CF (R)	38	10	7	21	37	57	−20	37
19	Andalucía CF (R)	38	9	8	21	31	56	−25	35
20	CD Mármol Macael (R)	38	7	4	27	33	84	−51	25

Source: Fútbol Regional
(P) Promoted; (R) Relegated

== Group X ==
Pos	Team	Pld	W	D	L	GF	GA	GD	Pts
1	CD Villanueva	42	24	14	4	70	35	+35	86
2	UD Los Palacios (P)	42	20	15	7	61	32	+29	75
3	Lucentino	42	21	12	9	65	48	+17	75
4	CD Alcalá	42	18	20	4	66	42	+24	74
5	Dos Hermanas CF	42	20	13	9	78	49	+29	73
6	Coria CF	42	21	7	14	64	49	+15	70
7	Jerez Industrial CF	42	17	14	11	58	51	+7	65
8	Córdoba CF B	42	18	9	15	71	73	−2	63
9	AD Cartaya	42	13	19	10	52	42	+10	58
10	RB Linense	42	12	19	11	49	44	+5	55
11	CA Antoniano	42	14	12	16	67	73	−6	54
12	Atlético Sanluqueño CF	42	13	14	15	53	52	+1	53
13	CD San Fernando	42	14	11	17	45	55	−10	53
14	Montilla	42	12	14	16	53	63	−10	50
15	Bollullos	42	11	16	15	49	49	0	49
16	Serrallo	42	10	18	14	28	50	−22	48
17	UD Los Barrios	42	11	14	17	50	61	−11	47
18	Ayamonte CF (R)	42	12	6	24	42	64	−22	42
19	Recreativo de Huelva B (R)	42	10	12	20	45	55	−10	42
20	San José (R)	42	10	12	20	48	62	−14	42
21	Puerto Real CF (R)	42	9	9	24	42	70	−28	36
22	Cortegana (R)	42	7	10	25	37	74	−37	31

Source: Fútbol Regional
(P) Promoted; (R) Relegated

== Group XI ==
Pos	Team	Pld	W	D	L	GF	GA	GD	Pts
1	Villafranca	38	26	8	4	79	20	+59	86
2	CD Constancia	38	26	7	5	82	28	+54	85
3	CD Manacor	38	21	3	14	59	41	+18	66
4	UD Poblense	38	19	8	11	47	34	+13	65
5	SE Eivissa-Ibiza B	38	18	10	10	53	41	+12	64
6	CD Ferriolense	38	19	6	13	76	56	+20	63
7	CE Alaior	38	16	9	13	55	52	+3	57
8	CD Atlético Baleares	38	14	11	13	58	46	+12	53
9	Santa Eulalia	38	12	17	9	37	34	+3	53
10	CD Binissalem	38	13	10	15	42	52	−10	49
11	Pl. Calvià	38	12	12	14	47	44	+3	48
12	CD Santanyí	38	13	8	17	51	65	−14	47
13	Santa Ponsa	38	14	4	20	41	48	−7	46
14	CF Sporting Mahonés	38	12	8	18	44	53	−9	44
15	CD Montuïri	38	11	10	17	43	64	−21	43
16	UD Arenal	38	10	12	16	40	64	−24	42
17	Cardessar	38	11	7	20	43	59	−16	40
18	Paguera (R)	38	10	10	18	56	76	−20	40
19	Génova (R)	38	9	5	24	40	81	−41	32
20	San Rafael (R)	38	8	7	23	33	68	−35	31

Source: Fútbol Regional
(R) Relegated

== Group XII ==
Pos	Team	Pld	W	D	L	GF	GA	GD	Pts
1	Vecindario (P)	40	25	8	7	76	24	+52	83
2	Castillo	40	19	16	5	53	31	+22	73
3	Tenerife B	40	21	8	11	58	35	+23	71
4	Las Palmas B	40	19	10	11	63	39	+24	67
5	Santa Brígida	40	19	8	13	58	41	+17	65
6	Gáldar	40	17	11	12	60	44	+16	62
7	San Isidro	40	14	14	12	59	52	+7	56
8	La Oliva	40	15	11	14	46	42	+4	56
9	O. Marítima	40	15	11	14	52	57	−5	56
10	Victoria	40	13	15	12	44	44	0	54
11	Mensajero	40	14	11	15	58	62	−4	53
12	Ibarra	40	13	14	13	40	40	0	53
13	Las Zocas	40	13	13	14	46	54	−8	52
14	Laguna	40	13	13	14	45	49	−4	52
15	Teguise	40	13	12	15	47	50	−3	51
16	Tenisca	40	12	14	14	50	54	−4	50
17	Telde	40	10	18	12	39	41	−2	48
18	Agaete (R)	40	11	9	20	51	68	−17	42
19	Esperanza (R)	40	7	12	21	42	71	−29	33
20	Huracán (R)	40	8	8	24	48	81	−33	32
21	Valle Frontera (R)	40	7	8	25	29	85	−56	29

Source: Fútbol Regional
(P) Promoted; (R) Relegated

== Group XIII ==
Pos	Team	Pld	W	D	L	GF	GA	GD	Pts
1	Lorca Dep. (P)	38	27	10	1	89	25	+64	91
2	Yeclano (P)	38	27	6	5	85	36	+49	87
3	Mar Menor	38	26	9	3	111	34	+77	87
4	Águilas	38	23	10	5	92	45	+47	79
5	Sangonera	38	21	10	7	65	37	+28	73
6	Murcia B	38	20	6	12	70	56	+14	66
7	Caravaca	38	19	7	12	76	46	+30	64
8	Abarán	38	18	9	11	62	50	+12	63
9	Jumilla	38	17	10	11	66	45	+21	61
10	Bala Azul	38	14	14	10	62	39	+23	56
11	UCAM	38	14	7	17	52	46	+6	49
12	Mazarrón	38	12	6	20	38	63	−25	42
13	Relesa L.Palas	38	10	10	18	39	63	−24	40
14	Lumbreras	38	9	9	20	31	57	−26	36
15	Pinatar	38	8	11	19	37	72	−35	35
16	Molinense	38	9	7	22	31	66	−35	34
17	Calasparra	38	8	7	23	42	75	−33	31
18	Beniel (R)	38	6	7	25	41	95	−54	25
19	Blanca (R)	38	6	3	29	33	101	−68	21
20	Totana (R)	38	4	6	28	29	100	−71	18

Source: Fútbol Regional
(P) Promoted; (R) Relegated

== Group XIV ==
Pos	Team	Pld	W	D	L	GF	GA	GD	Pts
1	Cerro Reyes	38	29	7	2	71	19	+52	94
2	Don Benito	38	26	10	2	102	24	+78	88
3	Villanovense (P)	38	26	6	6	82	29	+53	84
4	Extremadura B	38	20	10	8	68	34	+34	70
5	Badajoz B	38	18	15	5	62	24	+38	69
6	Plasencia	38	19	12	7	62	33	+29	69
7	Alburquerque	38	15	8	15	53	47	+6	53
8	Villafranca	38	12	15	11	39	38	+1	51
9	Grabasa Burg.	38	13	10	15	50	55	−5	49
10	Coria	38	12	11	15	60	61	−1	47
11	Santa Amalia	38	11	13	14	46	48	−2	46
12	Montijo	38	10	14	14	39	45	−6	44
13	La Estrella	38	10	13	15	43	57	−14	43
14	Monesterio	38	12	7	19	49	70	−21	43
15	Ciudad Plasenc.	38	11	8	19	45	80	−35	41
16	Arroyo	38	9	12	17	42	78	−36	39
17	Valdelacalzada (R)	38	8	11	19	46	78	−32	35
18	Guadiana (R)	38	6	12	20	28	50	−22	30
19	Olivenza (R)	38	5	9	24	32	62	−30	24
20	Gran Maestre (R)	38	3	7	28	28	115	−87	16

Source: Fútbol Regional
(P) Promoted; (R) Relegated

== Group XV ==
Pos	Team	Pld	W	D	L	GF	GA	GD	Pts
1	Mirandés (P)	40	25	14	1	73	17	+56	89
2	Alfaro (P)	40	24	9	7	75	36	+39	81
3	Recreación (P)	40	21	10	9	71	40	+31	73
4	Oberena	40	20	12	8	74	42	+32	72
5	Aoiz	40	19	13	8	49	33	+16	70
6	Egüés	40	19	11	10	77	51	+26	68
7	Haro	40	16	11	13	54	46	+8	59
8	Tudelano	40	14	14	12	43	52	−9	56
9	Izarra	40	13	15	12	46	46	0	54
10	San Marcial	40	14	12	14	39	45	−6	54
11	Chantrea	40	13	12	15	45	43	+2	51
12	Urroztarra	40	13	9	18	59	61	−2	48
13	Alberite	40	14	6	20	46	63	−17	48
14	Lourdes	40	11	14	15	53	68	−15	47
15	Burladés	40	11	13	16	53	54	−1	46
16	Aluvión	40	12	9	19	36	42	−6	45
17	Mutilvera	40	11	10	19	38	45	−7	43
18	Beti Onak (R)	40	10	13	17	35	57	−22	43
19	Subiza (R)	40	10	10	20	36	67	−31	40
20	River Ebro (R)	40	8	13	19	42	68	−26	37
21	Ilumberri (R)	40	2	10	28	32	100	−68	16

Source: Fútbol Regional
(P) Promoted; (R) Relegated

== Group XVI ==
Pos	Team	Pld	W	D	L	GF	GA	GD	Pts
1	Fraga	40	25	7	8	72	36	+36	82
2	Huesca	40	24	9	7	68	34	+34	81
3	Casetas (P)	40	24	9	7	73	29	+44	81
4	Barbastro	40	21	13	6	64	28	+36	76
5	Teruel	40	21	11	8	61	35	+26	74
6	Utebo	40	19	7	14	54	46	+8	64
7	Monzón	40	15	13	12	53	50	+3	58
8	Sariñena	40	16	8	16	40	37	+3	56
9	Fuentes	40	16	8	16	52	61	−9	56
10	Univ. Zaragoza	40	15	7	18	77	66	+11	52
11	Ebro	40	14	10	16	36	49	−13	52
12	Andorra	40	13	10	17	44	54	−10	49
13	Zuera	40	12	11	17	58	56	+2	47
14	Sabiñánigo	40	13	8	19	53	72	−19	47
15	Monzalbarba	40	12	10	18	45	65	−20	46
16	Alagón	40	12	8	20	51	85	−34	44
17	Jacetano (R)	40	12	8	20	49	65	−16	44
18	Villanueva (R)	40	11	9	20	37	61	−24	42
19	Alcañiz (R)	40	10	11	19	48	52	−4	41
20	La Almunia (R)	40	9	9	22	40	73	−33	36
21	Figueruelas (R)	40	7	12	21	31	52	−21	33

Source: Fútbol Regional
(P) Promoted; (R) Relegated

== Group XVII ==
Pos	Team	Pld	W	D	L	GF	GA	GD	Pts
1	Hellín	38	22	13	3	71	24	+47	79
2	Quintanar	38	22	11	5	72	28	+44	77
3	Guadalajara	38	22	7	9	62	33	+29	73
4	Tomelloso (P)	38	21	10	7	48	22	+26	73
5	Villarrobledo	38	20	11	7	62	24	+38	71
6	Cuenca	38	20	8	10	54	35	+19	68
7	Torpedo 66	38	16	12	10	38	30	+8	60
8	Almansa	38	15	13	10	42	26	+16	58
9	La Roda	38	15	7	16	54	50	+4	52
10	Puertollano	38	11	15	12	44	46	−2	48
11	Albacete B	38	12	10	16	55	52	+3	46
12	Socuéllamos	38	13	5	20	37	62	−25	44
13	Manzanares	38	10	12	16	35	52	−17	42
14	Toledo B	38	11	9	18	37	56	−19	42
15	Alcázar	38	9	12	17	30	39	−9	39
16	Torrijos	38	8	13	17	30	57	−27	37
17	Sigüenza	38	9	10	19	30	59	−29	37
18	At. Tarazona (R)	38	8	10	20	29	48	−19	34
19	Los Yébenes (R)	38	9	7	22	34	65	−31	34
20	Valdepeñas (R)	38	6	7	25	31	87	−56	25

Source: Fútbol Regional
(P) Promoted; (R) Relegated

== Promotion play-off ==
Source:
