= Nené Ballina =

Spanish football player and manager

Personal information
- Full name: José Antonio de la Ballina Avilés
- Date of birth: 29 April 1964 (age 62)
- Place of birth: Santa Isabel, Spanish Guinea
- Height: 1.85 m (6 ft 1 in)
- Positions: Striker; attacking midfielder

Youth career
- –1980: Lealtad
- 1980–1981: Sporting Gijón
- 1981–1982: Oviedo

Senior career*
Years	Team	Apps	(Gls)
1982–1985	Oviedo B	57	(9)
1982–1983	→ Águila Negra (loan)		
1984–1986	Oviedo	1	(0)
1985–1986	→ Lenense (loan)	33	(12)
1986–1987	Avilés	31	(10)
1987–1988	Almansa		
1988–1989	Rayo Vallecano	9	(0)
1990	Villarreal	13	(3)
1990–1991	Gimnástica Torrelavega	36	(13)
1991–1992	Racing Santander	21	(4)
1992–1993	Palamós	36	(14)
1993–1994	Real Burgos	25	(2)
1994–1995	Palamós	16	(0)
1995–1996	Langreo	0	(0)

Managerial career
- 1995–1999: Lealtad (youth)
- 1999–2002: Lealtad
- 2002–2003: Ribadesella
- 2005–2007: Condal
- 2007: Almansa
- 2008–2011: Gijón Industrial
- 2011–2012: Navia
- 2012–2013: Langreo
- 2014: Siero
- 2016: Villaviciosa
- 2016–2017: Ribadesella
- 2019–2020: Colunga
- * Club domestic league appearances and goals

José Antonio de la Ballina Avilés (born 29 April 1964), known as Nené Ballina or simply Nené, is a Spanish football manager and former player. He played as a striker and an attacking midfielder.

== Early life ==
Nené was born in Santa Isabel (now Malabo), Spanish Guinea (now Equatorial Guinea) to Spanish parents who returned to Villaviciosa, Asturias (where his father hails) with him, when he was 3 years old.

== Career ==
Nené managed two scoreless La Liga appearances for Rayo Vallecano in the 1989–90 season.
