= AD San José =

Spanish football club

- Full name: Agrupación Deportiva San José
- Founded: 1988
- Ground: Felipe del Valle, La Rinconada, Spain
- Capacity: 750
- Chairman: (Spain) Vicente Casado
- Manager: (Spain) Francisco Carmona
- League: Primera Andaluza Sevilla
- 2025–26: Primera Andaluza Sevilla, 3rd of 16
Home colours	Away colours

Agrupación Deportiva San José is a Spanish football team based in La Rinconada, Province of Sevilla, in the autonomous community of Andalusia. Founded in 1988, it plays in Primera Andaluza Sevilla, holding home matches at Felipe del Valle, with a 750-seat capacity.

== History ==
The first steps in what was the germ of San José date back to the 1930s. At that time, there was talk of Club Deportivo Carioca, also known as Club Deportivo San José, which played in what was then called La Rinconada Estación. One of the players from those early years, Antonio Rojas, was the one who, later, on September 18, 1951, officially registered the team with the Seville Football Federation under the name Club Deportivo San José and with the number 1,009, being the ninth in the entire province to do so.

In 1956, Club Deportivo San José merged with another club in the area called Club Deportivo Trianilla, which had been its main rival on the field until then.

The first surviving written chronicle dates from that same year, which speaks of a new team called Unión Deportiva Estrella, which had a short run and then disappeared.

On October 21, 1956, the Unión Deportiva Cañamera was founded . It was made up of workers from the town's most important factory at the time. It grew to a large group thanks to local workers and those who came from surrounding towns to work at the factory. Its first president was José Ortiz González, and among its most notable players were Francisco Sánchez Pérez, known as "Castañita," not to mention Frasco, the Lys brothers, and Javier, who had played for Sevilla Fútbol Club.

This club could be classified as the successor of Club Deportivo San José, since it kept the affiliation number to the Sevillana Football Federation (1,009).

A year later, coinciding with the Jira, the La Rosaleda field was inaugurated, located next to the factory silos, in an area where only the Cáñamo tower and the building where the Radio Rinconada studios are located remain today.

Unión Deportiva Cañamera participated in the Seville Provincial Championship and the First Regional Championship, which also included teams from Seville and Huelva, in subsequent years, achieving its first historic milestone, football-wise, in the town by winning the Seville Trophy in 1960 and 1961.

The team would later go from strength to strength, achieving promotion to the Third Division in the 1962–63 season after defeating Alcalá 3–1. The following year, fans were able to enjoy their team in the Third Division (at that time, there was no Second Division B, so the Third Division was the Bronze tier of Spanish football). However, it was a short-lived spell that lasted only one season, and relegation was finalized the following year.

During those years, Unión Deportiva Cañamera managed to write its name in gold letters by winning the Ramón Sánchez Pizjuán Cup, a coveted trophy at the time, which was only awarded to higher-division teams.

With the demise of the hemp factory, football has fallen into disrepair in the town, although Francisco Sánchez Pérez retains his license number thanks to the registration of a youth team. This team, in the 1969–70 season, was the last team to compete under the name Unión Deportiva Cañamera.

In the 1971–72 season, a new team was born in the town with the same number 1,009 in the Seville Football Federation's registry. Its name corresponded to the acronym of the Institute of Agronomic Research, which was established in Cáñamo after a fire destroyed the old factory. The first president was Francisco Gómez Zarzo, while Francisco Sánchez "Castañita" served as coach. We could conclude that it was La Cañamera, but it had to change its name to continue using the facilities at La Rosaleda.

This team spent several years in the Second and First Regional Divisions, even merging with Universal Plantas, another local federation team, created in the 1974–75 season at the company's request. From their merger, Club Deportivo San José emerged in the 1979–80 season, whose first president was Antonio Fernández Rodríguez and whose first coach was Juan José Ruiz Falantes . They began playing in the Second Regional Amateur Division.

In 1983, a new team emerged in the town, drawn from the members of the Peña Sevillista. It was called Recreativo San José, and its first president was Emilio Romero, while Antonio Málaga was chosen as its coach.

A new rivalry soon emerged between the two until 1988, when they merged, retaining their membership number of 1,009, adopting the City Council's crest, and adopting the name Agrupación Deportiva San José. Its first president was Manuel de los Reyes Hita Alonso, but over the years, others joined the club, such as José Luis Dorado, Juan López Colomé, Juanito de la Cantina, Juan Antonio Cerezo, and Antonio Martínez Pajuelo. During these years, the team alternated between the Regional Preferente, with some very ambitious projects, and the First Provincial, enduring many financial hardships. During these years, the team moved from La Rosaleda to the Felipe del Valle Stadium in the 1992–93 season.

In the 1996–97 season, Miguel Cárdenas Molina, who had previously been one of the team's most outstanding players, became president, and with him came some of the club's best years. His goal was to reach the Third Division during his term, but he built strong foundations in both the first team and the youth academy to make sure the success would last long-term. He improved the club’s financial situation by involving the club's former players, reorganized the lower divisions into the structure used today, and greatly increased membership to more than 1,200 people.

In the 1999–2000 season, San José finished the regular season in the Regional Preferente in second place, behind Antoniano, which was coached by a certain Antonio Gil, who had showed promise. The Cañamero coach was Cristóbal Mejía, another famous player from the club.

That second place gave them the option to compete in the play-off for promotion to the Third Division, along with Atlético Cordobés, Cortegana, and Cádiz B, the big favorites for promotion (only the group leader went through) and the first opponent to visit Cañamero's home. That match ended 1–5 against them and with great disappointment among the fans, who, however, as the play-offs progressed, regained faith in light of the results, to the point that the team reached the final matchday in first place in the group. The final match, at the Ramón de Carranza, mobilized many fans who traveled to the Tacita de Plata by chartered buses or in private cars. A draw would have been enough for Cristóbal Mejía's team, but from the start of the match, the blue and whites went all out for victory. After much tension, San José won 2–3 and secured promotion, to the delight of the fans and the anger of the local parish, which forced the police to take action and require all Cañamero fans to remain at the sports grounds for more than two hours. This time didn't seem long at all; it served to kick off the party, which lasted until the early hours of the morning, on the return trip and in the park next to San José Church, now known as the Saharawi People's Park. Furthermore, that match saw the consecration of José Mari, Miguel Ángel, Genaro, Israel, Pepito, Sedeño, Eloy, and David Augusto, among others, as idols of the fans.

34 years after La Cañamera did so, San José was promoted to the Third Division, a category in which it remained for three seasons. The first, with Miguel Cárdenas as president and Antonio Gil on the bench, the team achieved its best record in history by finishing sixth in Group X of the Third Division. That year, Sevilla B, with Reyes and Antoñito, among others in the squad, played the promotion phase to Second Division B; Betis B, with Doblas, Rivas, Arzu and Varela, Lucentino, who had the scorer Izco, and Sanluqueño, where Diego Ramírez and Manolo Sanlúcar played. San José maintained a chance of finishing fourth until the last match, which they played in Chiclana . Sanluqueño's victory in Tomares (2–0) cut short any hopes of continuing to make history. Jerez Industrial finished fifth and Los Cañameros finally finished sixth. Diego Sedeño, Eloy, Garcés, Fran Roser, David Augusto, Miguel Ángel, and Isaac stood out in that team, among the rest of the squad.

The second year in the Third Division saw a change in the presidency with the arrival of vice-president Miguel Cárdenas, Lorenzo Sánchez Cano, son of the legendary "Castañita." It was the 2001–2002 season, and San José finished the competition in mid-table with Antonio Gil in charge. Gil left for Coria midway through the season, leaving the position to Paco Marín, who had coached Écija in the Second Division.

That campaign, the sixth-place finish the previous year, had allowed the team to compete in the Copa Federación, a tournament similar to the Copa del Rey created by the Spanish Football Federation, in which Second Division B and Third Division teams took part.

The blue and whites defeated two teams from the lower division of Spanish football: Algeciras, with a goal at the Nuevo Mirador by David Barriga, and Jerez de los Caballeros, with a late Isaac strike at the Ciudad Deportiva Manuel Calzado Galván. The third opponent was Quintanar del Rey, from Cuenca, a team well established in the Third Division. A goal from Alfonso in the first leg, and another from Garcés in the second leg, wrapped up the tie. The quarterfinals arrived, and their lucky opponent was Atlético Baleares. In the first leg, held in Palma de Mallorca, the final score was 3–3, with the home side coming back thanks to the referee's favor. In the second leg, an own goal from Óscar ended the Cañameros' dream of continuing to advance in the competition.

The 2002–2003 season was disastrous for the blue and whites. After building a great squad that included players such as Quintero (Nástic), José Carlos (Tortosa), Ñoño Méndez (Jaén), and Félix (Jerez Industrial), the team gradually faded as the matchdays went by. Paco Marín resigned, and Santi Aragón, who had been his assistant, was unable to turn things around. In the final stretch of the season, with Juanma Corbacho in charge, the team suffered relegation after a series of matches that inexplicably slipped away. Against Dos Hermanas, when San José was winning 0–3, the result was 4–3. Against San Fernando, who came back from a 1–0 deficit, and against Alcalá on the penultimate matchday, when San José was winning 2–0 and ended up losing 2–3, mathematically making the relegation of the category and the last visit to Lucena futile.

On May 21, 2003, Francisco Sánchez, known as "Castañita," also died, leaving the team he had been a great supporter and driving force behind.

The following year, with the team back in the Preferente, the bid was ambitious to regain the league. With Javi Blanco on the bench, and the discovery of a certain Javi Varas in goal, the team finished fourth, losing their chances of qualifying for the playoffs with two matches remaining due to a mistake by Javi Varas, who had been by far the team's best player throughout the campaign, against Castilleja.

That same season, on the final matchday of the season against Cabecense on May 2, another tragedy occurred with the death of Francisco Manuel Sánchez Parra on the pitch shortly after the start of the second half. Sudden death was considered as the cause of death, although his family never made the autopsy public.

In the 2004–2005 season, the Andalusian Football Federation created the Andalusian First Division, a step between the Preferente and the Third Division, which San José achieved after finishing fourth in the previous season. However, that year was not a good one, and the team was relegated on the penultimate matchday after losing at Nuevo San Bartolomé de Mairena.

Back in Preferente, the club opted for Carlos Cortés, a homegrown coach who had previously managed Rinconada, to take over the bench in 2005–2006. The team consolidated its position throughout the season and finished third, level on points with Paradas but trailing the Campiña side in goal average. This prevented them from gaining promotion, despite a playoff win over La Rambla, but to no avail.

The 2006–2007 season saw Carlos Cortés and Juan Carlos Menudo as coaches. The team finished in mid-table, leaving a sour taste in the fans' mouths.

In 2007–2008, the board, still chaired by Lorenzo Sánchez Cano, opted to keep Juan Carlos Menudo on the bench, and after much suffering, on April 4, 2008, the team was promoted to the First Division of Andalusia after defeating Carmona 3–0, with goals from Lobo, Buyo, and Álvaro César . Before that, in two nail-biting matches, the club had overturned a 1–0 deficit against Peña Deportiva Rociera in the last minute, with goals from Maldonado and Loren, and had beaten Puebla 1–0 with a goal from José Manuel, moving San Juan ahead of the table.

In the following season, 2008–2009, the Cañamero team was in the First Division of Andalusia. In its first year in the category, San José surprised everyone by achieving second place and tied on points with the leader, UD Marinaleda, who were promoted to the Third Division. The second place achieved by the Cañameros did not entitle them to promotion, since the second and third placed teams played a play-off. Although winning did not guarantee promotion, since a series of results had to occur in the classification of Group X of the Third Division, which ultimately did not occur. Despite everything, AD San José managed to win the play-off tie against Conil CF, although it was of little use.

After a few years in which the Cañamero team managed to establish itself in the First Andalusian League, AD San José would face a new challenge in the 2015–2016 season. At the beginning of that season, the Andalusian Football Federation announced the creation of a new intermediate category between the Third Division and the First Andalusian League, which would be renamed the Andalusian Honor Division. This category would be the final step towards promotion to the national league. In this competition, teams ranked between 3rd and 8th would occupy a new spot in the new league.

Despite a strong start to the 2015–2016 season, the team gradually faded, dropping to ninth with one match remaining. The final matchday was a promotion playoff against eighth-placed AD Nervión at the Antonio Puerta Stadium, meaning the match would be crucial for both teams in securing promotion. While a draw or defeat would suffice for AD Nervión, all that was needed for AD San José was to get the three points away from Piscina Sevilla. May 8, 2015, would be another memorable date in the club's history. After a tense start to the match, Sosa put the Cañameros ahead in the 22nd minute, a goal that would ensure they had a lead at halftime. But in the 59th minute, Nervión leveled the score, although in the 62nd minute, Saborido put his team back in front. Due to the visiting team's nervousness, Plusco missed a one-on-one that ended with a Nervión counterattack and a goal for the home side. At that point, San José was out of the División de Honor.

But the players seemingly refused to give up and continued searching for the long-awaited goal that would open the doors to glory. And it came. Disputes aside, the referee decided to add 12 minutes of stoppage time. In the 95th minute, Alvi burst down the wing to send in an exquisite cross that Plusco, the villain of the previous play that ended in a goal for the home side, ended up putting the ball into the net and adding his name to the list of players who opened the doors to heaven for Agrupación Deportiva San José.

In the 2016–2017 season, the club faced a major challenge: competing in the Andalusian First Division for the first time. To achieve this, the new board, with Pepe Luis Casado as president, decided to sign Dioni Arroyo as the blue and white manager and build a squad capable of competing in the new division. This season, the blue and white club, with a completely renewed roster, achieved a creditable 12th place (out of 20 teams), in a season where the six lowest-placed teams were relegated.

The 2020–21 season was a rather dull year, with AD San José relegated to the Primera Andaluza. It was a difficult year due to the COVID-19 pandemic that ravaged the world. Following this episode, the club was greatly revitalized with a new and young board of directors headed by its president, Jose María Rojas González.

Regarding the youth academy, women's football is gaining ground at the club. It has grown from one team to three federated teams in different categories.

== Season to season ==
Season	Tier	Division	Place	Copa del Rey
1988–89	5	Reg. Pref.	10th	
1989–90	5	Reg. Pref.	11th	
1990–91	5	Reg. Pref.	9th	
1991–92	5	Reg. Pref.	6th	
1992–93	5	Reg. Pref.	15th	
1993–94	6	1ª Reg.	8th	
1994–95	6	1ª Reg.	2nd	
1995–96	5	Reg. Pref.	10th	
1996–97	5	Reg. Pref.	6th	
1997–98	5	Reg. Pref.	3rd	
1998–99	5	Reg. Pref.	4th	
1999–2000	5	Reg. Pref.	2nd	
2000–01	4	3°	6th	
2001–02	4	3°	10th	
2002–03	4	3°	20th	
2003–04	5	Reg. Pref.	4th	
2004–05	5	1ª And.	14th	
2005–06	6	Reg. Pref.	3rd	
2006–07	6	Reg. Pref.	6th	
2007–08	6	Reg. Pref.	2nd	

Season	Tier	Division	Place	Copa del Rey
2008–09	5	1ª And.	2nd	
2009–10	5	1ª And.	8th	
2010–11	5	1ª And.	13rd	
2011–12	5	1ª And.	8th	
2012–13	5	1ª And.	4th	
2013–14	5	1ª And.	4th	
2014–15	5	1ª And.	6th	
2015–16	5	1ª And.	8th	
2016–17	5	Div. Hon.	12th	
2017–18	5	Div. Hon.	9th	
2018–19	5	Div. Hon.	12th	
2019–20	5	Div. Hon.	13th	
2020–21	5	Div. Hon.	7th	
2021–22	7	1ª And.	1st	
2022–23	7	1ª And.	2nd	
2023–24	7	1ª And.	8th	
2024–25	7	1ª And.	2nd	
2025–26	7	1ª And.	3rd	
2026–27	7	1ª And.		

- 3 seasons in Tercera División
