= 2001–02 Tercera División =

Tercera División
- Season: 2001–02
- Dates: August 2001–June 2002
- Matches: 12,920

The 2001–02 Tercera División season is the 25th season since establishment the tier four. Consisted of 17 groups each of 20 teams.

== Classification ==
Key to colors in league table:
Play-off for promotion
Direct relegation

=== Group I ===
Pos	Team	Pld	W	D	L	GF	GA	GD	Pts
1	S.D. Compostela B	38	19	12	7	55	26	+29	69
2	Alondras C.F.	38	18	12	8	61	39	+22	66
3	Betanzos C.F.	38	18	12	8	52	29	+23	66
4	Club Lemos	38	18	11	9	52	33	+19	65
5	C. Rápido Bouzas	38	16	14	8	48	30	+18	62
6	C.D. Grove	38	19	5	14	55	47	+8	62
7	C.D. Lalín	38	17	10	11	46	35	+11	61
8	Verín C.F.	38	18	7	13	43	39	+4	61
9	R.C. Dep. Coruña B	38	16	12	10	64	50	+14	60
10	C.C.D. Cerceda	38	15	14	9	43	31	+12	59
11	Ponte Ourense C.F.	38	16	10	12	50	38	+12	58
12	C. At. Arteixo	38	16	9	13	48	37	+11	57
13	Racing Club Villalbés	38	15	8	15	36	53	−17	53
14	U.D. Xove Lago	38	14	8	16	34	41	−7	50
15	Feiraco S.D. Negreira	38	11	9	18	45	53	−8	42
16	Arousa S.C.	38	11	8	19	33	45	−12	41
17	Viveiro C.F.	38	9	12	17	54	66	−12	39
18	C.D. Endesa As Pontes	38	9	7	22	30	53	−23	34
19	Porriño Ind. F.C.	38	7	9	22	47	64	−17	30
20	Gondomar C.F.	38	0	7	31	19	106	−87	7

=== Group II ===
Pos	Team	Pld	W	D	L	GF	GA	GD	Pts
1	Langreo	38	23	10	5	57	24	+33	79
2	Avilés Industrial	38	23	9	6	75	26	+49	78
3	Siero	38	22	10	6	75	34	+41	76
4	Ribadesella	38	17	15	6	62	34	+28	66
5	Pumarín	38	18	7	13	54	46	+8	61
6	San Martín	38	15	15	8	41	32	+9	60
7	Colloto	38	16	11	11	47	41	+6	59
8	Navarro	38	15	13	10	57	44	+13	58
9	Llanes	38	16	9	13	52	48	+4	57
10	Titánico	38	16	7	15	46	45	+1	55
11	Lealtad	38	13	13	12	57	56	+1	52
12	Mosconia	38	14	9	15	44	50	−6	51
13	Astur	38	12	11	15	42	44	−2	47
14	Navia	38	13	8	17	51	58	−7	47
15	Narcea	38	11	12	15	35	49	−14	45
16	Condal	38	11	10	17	39	54	−15	43
17	Turón	38	8	11	19	35	68	−33	35
18	Piloñesa	38	5	10	23	29	64	−35	25
19	Valdesoto	38	4	9	25	33	80	−47	21
20	San Lázaro	38	4	9	25	31	65	−34	21

=== Group III ===
Pos	Team	Pld	W	D	L	GF	GA	GD	Pts
1	Noja	38	27	9	2	82	14	+68	90
2	Racing Sant. B	38	27	5	6	95	22	+73	86
3	Tropezón	38	24	5	9	56	24	+32	77
4	Bezana	38	23	7	8	72	35	+37	76
5	Laredo	38	21	10	7	61	36	+25	73
6	Velarde	38	16	12	10	43	31	+12	60
7	Albericia	38	16	8	14	52	45	+7	56
8	At. Deva	38	14	14	10	38	33	+5	56
9	Castro	38	15	9	14	39	41	−2	54
10	Barreda	38	12	13	13	36	33	+3	49
11	Ribamontán	38	15	3	20	43	56	−13	48
12	Cayón	38	11	9	18	37	53	−16	42
13	Textil Escudo	38	11	8	19	38	45	−7	41
14	Vimenor	38	11	8	19	40	63	−23	41
15	Escobedo	38	10	10	18	26	45	−19	40
16	Pontejos	38	11	6	21	37	59	−22	39
17	Rayo Cantab.	38	10	9	19	46	77	−31	39
18	Comillas	38	9	9	20	35	68	−33	36
19	Ayrón	38	8	9	21	25	62	−37	33
20	Santoña	38	5	5	28	22	81	−59	20

=== Group IV ===
Pos	Team	Pld	W	D	L	GF	GA	GD	Pts
1	Lemona	38	23	9	6	73	31	+42	78
2	Sestao River	38	21	9	8	58	28	+30	72
3	Zalla	38	21	6	11	42	38	+4	69
4	Amorebieta	38	20	7	11	51	34	+17	67
5	Aurrerá Ond.	38	19	8	11	42	40	+2	65
6	Univers. PV	38	17	9	12	40	39	+1	60
7	Baskonia	38	16	10	12	51	41	+10	58
8	Dep. Alavés C	38	14	12	12	52	42	+10	54
9	Arenas G.	38	15	9	14	49	34	+15	54
10	Portugalete	38	15	9	14	46	41	+5	54
11	San Pedro	38	14	11	13	41	36	+5	53
12	Aurrerá Vit. B	38	13	14	11	35	31	+4	53
13	Bermeo	38	13	12	13	41	39	+2	51
14	Cult. Durango	38	12	10	16	41	48	−7	46
15	Zamudio	38	12	8	18	35	39	−4	44
16	Real Unión B	38	10	12	16	41	46	−5	42
17	Sodupe	38	11	8	19	36	55	−19	41
18	Salleko	38	12	5	21	40	67	−27	41
19	Zestoa	38	10	6	22	33	59	−26	36
20	Anaitasuna	38	2	6	30	18	77	−59	12

=== Group V ===
Pos	Team	Pld	W	D	L	GF	GA	GD	Pts
1	Palamós	38	21	11	6	76	37	+39	74
2	Gavà	38	22	7	9	60	42	+18	73
3	Reus	38	20	10	8	52	34	+18	70
4	Sant Andreu	38	18	8	12	57	59	−2	62
5	Badaloní	38	16	9	13	58	52	+6	57
6	Palafrugell	38	17	5	16	54	36	+18	56
7	Barcelona C	38	16	8	14	66	59	+7	56
8	Vilassar Mar	38	16	5	17	68	69	−1	53
9	Girona	38	15	7	16	40	45	−5	52
10	Tàrrega	38	13	9	16	51	54	−3	48
11	Gramenet B	38	10	17	11	40	47	−7	47
12	Guíxols	38	12	11	15	61	59	+2	47
13	Balaguer	38	12	10	16	48	46	+2	46
14	Manlleu	38	13	7	18	48	61	−13	46
15	Premià	38	13	7	18	52	60	−8	46
16	Manresa	38	13	7	18	44	57	−13	46
17	Europa	38	11	13	14	55	59	−4	46
18	Cornellà	38	12	10	16	36	50	−14	46
19	Júpiter	38	10	13	15	43	60	−17	43
20	Andorra	38	8	10	20	35	58	−23	34

=== Group VI ===
Pos	Team	Pld	W	D	L	GF	GA	GD	Pts
1	Burriana	38	23	10	5	57	22	+35	79
2	Burjassot	38	21	12	5	61	25	+36	75
3	Levante B	38	22	7	9	68	34	+34	73
4	Villajoyosa	38	17	14	7	55	32	+23	65
5	Eldense	38	17	10	11	45	37	+8	61
6	Alzira	38	17	9	12	35	38	−3	60
7	Gimnástico	38	13	14	11	37	30	+7	53
8	Vinarós	38	14	10	14	52	46	+6	52
9	Elche B	38	15	7	16	54	50	+4	52
10	Alcoyano	38	15	7	16	49	52	−3	52
11	Ontinyent	38	14	9	15	42	36	+6	51
12	Gandía	38	14	8	16	35	44	−9	50
13	Pego	38	12	13	13	47	45	+2	49
14	Santa Pola	38	10	17	11	42	41	+1	47
15	Castellón B	38	11	12	15	40	45	−5	45
16	Torrellano	38	10	15	13	37	49	−12	45
17	Carcaixent	38	8	12	18	30	63	−33	36
18	Vall d'Uixó	38	8	9	21	29	61	−32	33
19	Pinoso	38	6	11	21	33	61	−28	29
20	At. Denia	38	5	10	23	35	72	−37	25

=== Group VII ===
Pos	Team	Pld	W	D	L	GF	GA	GD	Pts
1	S.Sebast.Reyes	40	24	6	10	70	39	+31	78
2	Las Rozas	40	21	12	7	54	26	+28	75
3	Navalcarnero	40	22	6	12	59	41	+18	72
4	Móstoles	40	20	9	11	58	42	+16	69
5	Fuenlabrada	40	19	9	12	53	32	+21	66
6	At. Pinto	40	18	10	12	60	45	+15	64
7	Rayo Vallec. B	40	17	11	12	70	50	+20	62
8	Leganés B	40	17	8	15	58	60	−2	59
9	Santa Ana	40	17	7	16	57	52	+5	58
10	Orcasitas	40	15	13	12	54	48	+6	58
11	R. Madrid C	40	16	8	16	67	66	+1	56
12	San Fernando	40	14	12	14	49	51	−2	54
13	Puerta Bonita	40	14	11	15	44	41	+3	53
14	Rayo Majad.	40	15	8	17	52	59	−7	53
15	Pegaso	40	14	8	18	51	56	−5	50
16	Mejoreño	40	11	14	15	47	48	−1	47
17	Parla	40	12	9	19	56	60	−4	45
18	Torrejón	40	11	12	17	47	64	−17	45
19	Coslada	40	12	5	23	42	83	−41	41
20	Valdemoro	40	8	10	22	40	60	−20	34
21	Aranjuez	40	3	12	25	25	90	−65	21

=== Group VIII ===
Pos	Team	Pld	W	D	L	GF	GA	GD	Pts
1	Ávila	38	25	8	5	90	32	+58	83
2	Gim. Segoviana	38	23	10	5	78	36	+42	79
3	Valladolid B	38	21	10	7	77	28	+49	73
4	Palencia	38	21	8	9	68	33	+35	71
5	Numancia B	38	20	11	7	61	33	+28	71
6	La Bañeza	38	17	11	10	47	38	+9	62
7	Gim. Medinense	38	17	7	14	56	52	+4	58
8	Becerril	38	16	7	15	47	50	−3	55
9	Norma S. L.	38	16	5	17	54	49	+5	53
10	Tordesillas	38	14	9	15	57	55	+2	51
11	Benavente	38	13	10	15	45	62	−17	49
12	Hullera	38	14	6	18	43	51	−8	48
13	Salamanca B	38	13	9	16	45	46	−1	48
14	C. Leonesa B	38	12	7	19	48	74	−26	43
15	Béjar Ind.	38	10	12	16	49	59	−10	42
16	Bembibre	38	11	9	18	34	51	−17	42
17	Almazán	38	12	5	21	39	63	−24	41
18	Santa Marta	38	11	7	20	35	61	−26	40
19	Las Navas	38	7	8	23	31	76	−45	29
20	Laguna	38	4	7	27	24	79	−55	19

=== Group IX ===
Pos	Team	Pld	W	D	L	GF	GA	GD	Pts
1	Linares	40	25	12	3	79	26	+53	87
2	Málaga B	40	27	6	7	90	23	+67	87
3	Torredonjim.	40	25	7	8	73	37	+36	82
4	Mármol Macael	40	19	14	7	56	30	+26	71
5	Granada 74	40	21	7	12	65	36	+29	70
6	Marbella	40	19	10	11	76	44	+32	67
7	Antequera	40	19	10	11	58	47	+11	67
8	Baza	40	19	8	13	55	43	+12	65
9	Arenas	40	14	14	12	46	49	−3	56
10	Úbeda	40	15	11	14	52	54	−2	56
11	Roquetas	40	14	12	14	44	50	−6	54
12	Guadix	40	15	9	16	41	38	+3	54
13	Alhaurino	40	16	5	19	49	65	−16	53
14	Vélez	40	14	7	19	45	59	−14	49
15	Loja	40	11	13	16	33	58	−25	46
16	Mancha Real	40	11	12	17	43	50	−7	45
17	Vandalia	40	11	10	19	33	50	−17	43
18	San Pedro	40	10	11	19	43	60	−17	41
19	Torremolinos	40	8	5	27	37	75	−38	29
20	Maracena	40	5	5	30	26	98	−72	20
21	Iliturgi	40	3	10	27	26	78	−52	19

=== Group X ===
Pos	Team	Pld	W	D	L	GF	GA	GD	Pts
1	Villanueva	38	21	11	6	68	33	+35	74
2	Jerez Ind.	38	21	10	7	67	26	+41	73
3	Antoniano	38	21	8	9	80	51	+29	71
4	Recre. Huelva B	38	19	11	8	53	32	+21	68
5	Lucentino	38	18	10	10	57	39	+18	64
6	Ayamonte	38	18	9	11	39	32	+7	63
7	Córdoba B	38	17	11	10	64	50	+14	62
8	Montilla	38	14	15	9	48	39	+9	57
9	Los Barrios	38	15	11	12	60	44	+16	56
10	San José	38	14	13	11	53	44	+9	55
11	Puerto Real	38	14	10	14	55	54	+1	52
12	Alcalá	38	14	9	15	48	46	+2	51
13	Los Palacios	38	12	14	12	47	42	+5	50
14	Cartaya	38	12	12	14	46	48	−2	48
15	Sanluqueño	38	14	5	19	39	61	−22	47
16	Portuense	38	14	4	20	41	49	−8	46
17	Pozoblanco	38	10	9	19	44	65	−21	39
18	Tomares	38	8	8	22	34	69	−35	32
19	San Roque	38	6	6	26	36	74	−38	24
20	Rec. Linense	38	2	6	30	27	108	−81	12

=== Group XI ===
Pos	Team	Pld	W	D	L	GF	GA	GD	Pts
1	At. Baleares	38	27	7	4	66	21	+45	88
2	Ferriolense	38	24	9	5	80	37	+43	81
3	Constancia	38	24	9	5	65	24	+41	81
4	Villafranca	38	23	9	6	77	40	+37	78
5	Santa Eulalia	38	19	10	9	65	40	+25	67
6	Santanyí	38	18	5	15	54	45	+9	59
7	Manacor	38	16	8	14	53	45	+8	56
8	Poblense	38	16	8	14	51	48	+3	56
9	Cardessar	38	15	6	17	48	50	−2	51
10	Montuiri	38	13	7	18	49	57	−8	46
11	Pl. Calvià	38	12	8	18	35	46	−11	44
12	Santa Ponsa	38	12	8	18	49	46	+3	44
13	Alayor	38	10	12	16	39	57	−18	42
14	Arenal	38	11	9	18	33	51	−18	42
15	Eivissa	38	10	11	17	33	44	−11	41
16	Sp. Mahonés	38	9	13	16	37	50	−13	40
17	Binisalem	38	10	10	18	47	60	−13	40
18	Sóller	38	12	4	22	44	81	−37	40
19	España	38	7	9	22	38	78	−40	30
20	Felanitx	38	7	8	23	31	74	−43	29

=== Group XII ===
Pos	Team	Pld	W	D	L	GF	GA	GD	Pts
1	Corralejo	38	22	10	6	70	33	+37	76
2	Castillo	38	21	9	8	63	31	+32	72
3	Santa Brígida	38	20	10	8	50	33	+17	70
4	Telde	38	19	12	7	57	30	+27	69
5	Tenerife B	38	16	15	7	57	39	+18	63
6	San Isidro	38	16	13	9	46	34	+12	61
7	Agaete	38	17	10	11	59	56	+3	61
8	Las Zocas	38	15	10	13	57	42	+15	55
9	Gáldar	38	12	12	14	56	62	−6	48
10	O. Marítima	38	12	12	14	42	43	−1	48
11	Laguna	38	11	14	13	35	39	−4	47
12	Ibarra	38	11	12	15	52	49	+3	45
13	Las Palmas B	38	9	18	11	44	43	+1	45
14	La Oliva	38	12	8	18	48	55	−7	44
15	Tenisca	38	11	11	16	43	46	−3	44
16	Victoria	38	11	10	17	47	66	−19	43
17	Esperanza	38	11	10	17	47	67	−20	43
18	Carrizal	38	10	12	16	49	62	−13	42
19	Maspalomas	38	9	6	23	37	74	−37	33
20	Águilas	38	4	8	26	31	86	−55	20

=== Group XIII ===
Pos	Team	Pld	W	D	L	GF	GA	GD	Pts
1	Orihuela	38	29	5	4	101	37	+64	92
2	Yeclano	38	25	8	5	72	30	+42	83
3	Águilas	38	24	9	5	90	35	+55	81
4	Lorca	38	25	5	8	71	25	+46	80
5	Sangonera	38	25	5	8	76	32	+44	80
6	Mar Menor	38	22	4	12	69	36	+33	70
7	Caravaca	38	19	9	10	69	56	+13	66
8	Bala Azul	38	17	10	11	58	38	+20	61
9	Murcia B	38	14	11	13	60	49	+11	53
10	UCAM	38	14	7	17	53	56	−3	49
11	Abarán	38	14	4	20	53	75	−22	46
12	Jumilla	38	12	8	18	52	57	−5	44
13	Relesa L.Palas	38	12	7	19	50	59	−9	43
14	Balsicas	38	11	8	19	49	60	−11	41
15	Calasparra	38	12	3	23	36	73	−37	39
16	Molinense	38	11	4	23	54	70	−16	37
17	Mazarrón	38	9	8	21	39	82	−43	35
18	Horadada	38	8	10	20	27	62	−35	34
19	Ceutí At.	38	6	4	28	32	104	−72	22
20	Alquerías	38	3	7	28	31	106	−75	16

=== Group XIV ===
Pos	Team	Pld	W	D	L	GF	GA	GD	Pts
1	Cacereño	38	33	2	3	131	28	+103	101
2	Don Benito	38	26	6	6	91	33	+58	84
3	Moralo	38	23	10	5	98	36	+62	79
4	Villanovense	38	22	7	9	78	37	+41	73
5	Badajoz B	38	21	6	11	58	38	+20	69
6	Plasencia	38	18	10	10	65	48	+17	64
7	Villafranca	38	17	11	10	58	45	+13	62
8	Cerro Reyes	38	18	6	14	64	48	+16	60
9	Extremadura B	38	14	8	16	65	59	+6	50
10	Gran Maestre	38	11	13	14	50	60	−10	46
11	Coria	38	14	4	20	48	68	−20	46
12	Montijo	38	11	11	16	42	58	−16	44
13	La Estrella	38	12	8	18	49	67	−18	44
14	Monesterio	38	11	10	17	51	56	−5	43
15	Santa Amalia	38	12	6	20	37	69	−32	42
16	Valdelacalzada	38	11	8	19	41	77	−36	41
17	Alburquerque	38	9	10	19	43	69	−26	37
18	Imperio Mérida	38	7	6	25	39	76	−37	27
19	Moraleja	38	6	9	23	36	94	−58	27
20	Calamonte	38	7	3	28	29	107	−78	24

=== Group XV ===
Pos	Team	Pld	W	D	L	GF	GA	GD	Pts
1	Azkoyen	38	23	10	5	72	28	+44	79
2	Peña Sport	38	21	11	6	59	30	+29	74
3	Recreación	38	18	12	8	45	28	+17	66
4	Burladés	38	19	9	10	61	36	+25	66
5	Egüés	38	17	14	7	53	35	+18	65
6	Mirandés	38	15	17	6	49	31	+18	62
7	Chantrea	38	13	12	13	58	50	+8	51
8	Aoiz	38	13	12	13	42	43	−1	51
9	Aluvión	38	14	7	17	47	56	−9	49
10	Mutilvera	38	13	9	16	52	52	0	48
11	Tudelano	38	14	6	18	43	60	−17	48
12	Izarra	38	10	16	12	43	47	−4	46
13	River Ebro	38	11	10	17	45	56	−11	43
14	Urroztarra	38	11	10	17	46	61	−15	43
15	Oberena	38	9	16	13	41	48	−7	43
16	Haro	38	10	13	15	49	55	−6	43
17	Beti Onak	38	9	15	14	33	39	−6	42
18	Agoncillo	38	10	11	17	47	61	−14	41
19	Idoya	38	9	10	19	38	57	−19	37
20	Pradejón	38	7	8	23	43	93	−50	29

=== Group XVI ===
Pos	Team	Pld	W	D	L	GF	GA	GD	Pts
1	Fraga	38	22	8	8	56	23	+33	74
2	Teruel	38	20	11	7	73	40	+33	71
3	Zuera	38	21	8	9	69	51	+18	71
4	Ebro	38	19	14	5	56	27	+29	71
5	Casetas	38	20	9	9	62	35	+27	69
6	Barbastro	38	19	6	13	52	38	+14	63
7	Alcañiz	38	16	7	15	57	46	+11	55
8	Utebo	38	15	9	14	48	50	−2	54
9	Fuentes	38	15	8	15	44	51	−7	53
10	Figueruelas	38	15	7	16	47	44	+3	52
11	Sariñena	38	15	6	17	43	64	−21	51
12	Andorra	38	14	7	17	38	48	−10	49
13	Monzalbarba	38	14	7	17	56	58	−2	49
14	Sabiñánigo	38	11	14	13	49	47	+2	47
15	Villanueva	38	13	6	19	39	54	−15	45
16	La Almunia	38	12	8	18	39	50	−11	44
17	Lalueza	38	11	11	16	35	49	−14	44
18	San Gregorio	38	11	5	22	43	74	−31	38
19	Alcampel	38	10	6	22	57	66	−9	36
20	Altorricón	38	5	7	26	33	81	−48	22

=== Group XVII ===
Pos	Team	Pld	W	D	L	GF	GA	GD	Pts
1	Tomelloso CF	38	20	15	3	45	16	+29	75
2	Albacete B	38	21	9	8	60	24	+36	72
3	CP Villarrobledo	38	18	16	4	60	31	+29	70
4	CD Quintanar del Rey	38	19	10	9	58	37	+21	67
5	Hellín Deportivo	38	17	11	10	47	42	+5	62
6	CD Sigüenza	38	16	12	10	46	37	+9	60
7	AD Torpedo 66	38	15	13	10	39	25	+14	58
8	UD Almansa	38	14	12	12	37	30	+7	54
9	CD Torrijos	38	14	10	14	47	49	−2	52
10	La Roda Caja Rural	38	13	12	13	49	57	−8	51
11	CD Guadalajara	38	12	13	13	44	41	+3	49
12	UD Puertollano	38	12	10	16	47	46	+1	46
13	CD Toledo B	38	13	7	18	47	54	−7	46
14	Gimnástico Alcázar	38	10	13	15	42	47	−5	43
15	CD Cuenca	38	11	10	17	33	39	−6	43
16	Manzanares CF	38	11	8	19	39	62	−23	41
17	CF Valdepeñas	38	10	9	19	24	56	−32	39
18	CD Piedrabuena	38	8	12	18	36	52	−16	36
19	Sp. Cabanillas	38	9	9	20	36	61	−25	36
20	UD Talavera	38	6	11	21	25	55	−30	29
