= CD Lealtad =

Association football club in Spain

Coordinates: 43.486368°N 5.432234°W

Lealtad
- Full name: Club Deportivo Lealtad de Villaviciosa
- Nicknames: Leales (The Loyals); Negrillos (Blacks)
- Founded: April 1916; 110 years ago
- Stadium: Les Caleyes
- Capacity: 3,000
- President: Francisco Cabal
- Head coach: Luis Arturo Ruiz-Capillas
- League: Tercera Federación – Group 2
- 2025–26: Segunda Federación – Group 1, 17th of 18 (relegated)
- Website: http://www.cdlealtadvillaviciosa.com
Home colours	Away colours

Club Deportivo Lealtad de Villaviciosa (English: Loyalty Sporting Club of Villaviciosa) is a Spanish football team based in Villaviciosa, in the autonomous community of Asturias. Founded in 1916, it plays in Tercera Federación – Group 2, holding home games at Les Caleyes ground with a capacity of 3,000.

== History ==
Founded in 1916 by a group of young people at the Worker's Athenaeum, Lealtad played in regional leagues until 1990, when it was promoted for the first time to Tercera División. In 1998, with Marcelino García as coach, the club achieved its first promotion ever to Segunda División B after defeating Real Madrid "C", Betanzos CF and Gimnástica Segoviana in the promotion playoffs.

It only remained in the third tier one season and spent fifteen more seasons in Tercera before being promoted again in 2014, after overcoming a critical economic situation in 2012, by beating CD Puertollano in the shootout of the group champions' play-off.

This time, Lealtad avoided relegation after beating Racing Ferrol in the last match of the 2014–15 season by 1–0. In the 2015–16 season, Lealtad achieved a great year with a 10th position, the best ever in the club's history.

After four seasons in the third tier, Lealtad would be relegated to Tercera División in April 2018, after receiving an 8–0 defeat from Bilbao Athletic.

On 24 October 2018, Lealtad achieved their first Asturian Copa Federación by defeating Sporting de Gijón B after a penalty shootout. The team finished the 2018–19 league season without losses in the Group 2, but failed to promote to Segunda División B after failing to beat firstly Getafe B and later Villarrobledo.

== Stadium ==
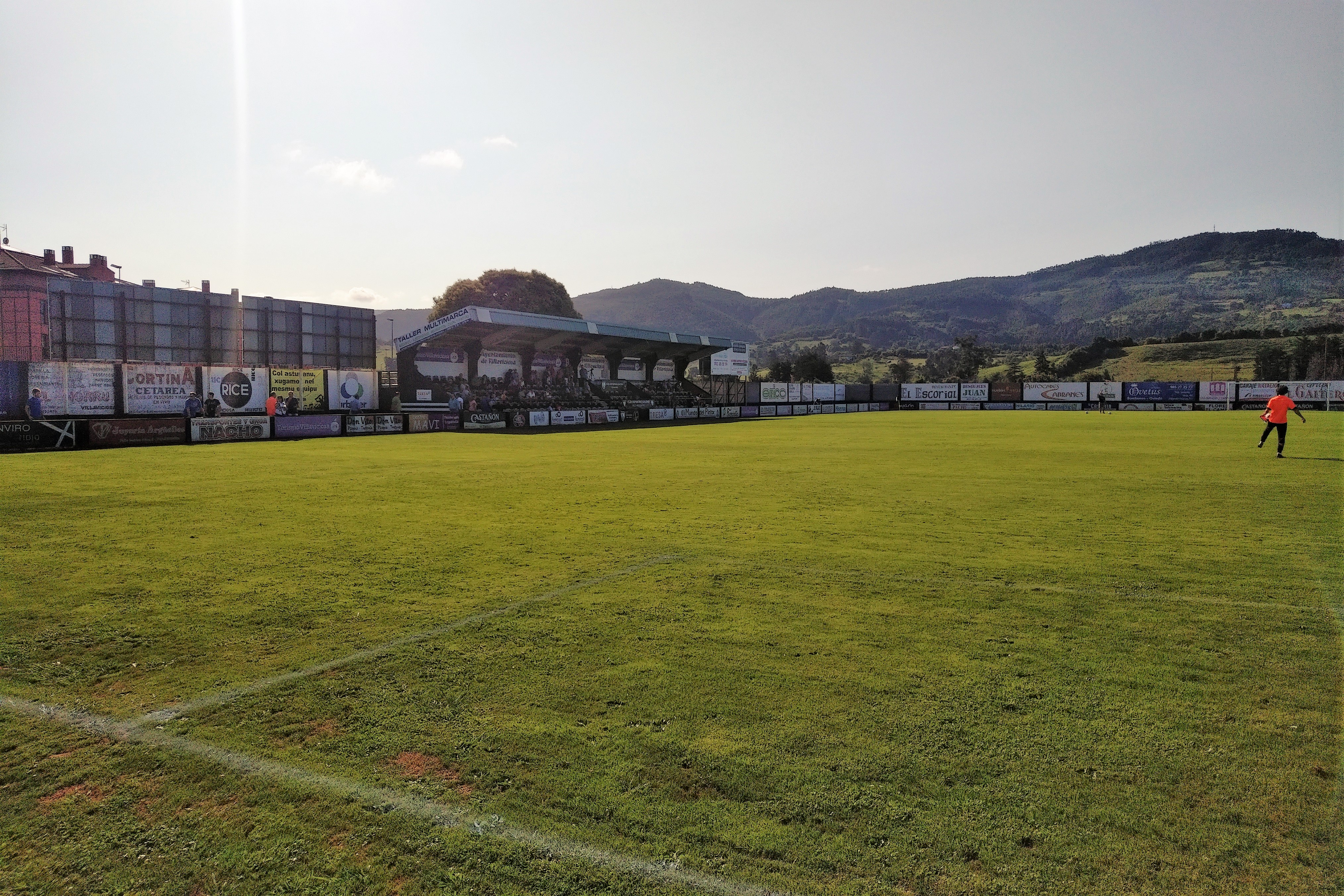
Les Caleyes main tribune.

Lealtad plays its games at Estadio Les Caleyes located next to the river mouth of Villaviciosa. It has a capacity of 3,000 spectators and after its last renovation, the main tribune has 220 seats.

The record attendance was beaten on 24 April 2016, with 4,052 spectators at the club's match of the 2015–16 Segunda División B against Racing de Santander.

== Season to season ==
Season	Level	Division	Place	Copa del Rey
1919–1932		Regional	—	
1932–33	6	3ª Reg.	3rd	
1933–34	5	2ª Reg.	6th	
1934–35	5	2ª Reg.	2nd	
1935–36	5	2ª Reg.	6th	
1939–40	6	3ª Reg.		
1940–41	6	3ª Reg.		
1941–42	6	3ª Reg.		
1942–43	6	3ª Reg.	3rd	
1943–44	5	2ª Reg.	4th	
1944–45	5	2ª Reg.	1st	
1945–46	4	1ª Reg.		
1946–47	4	1ª Reg.	7th	
1947–48	4	1ª Reg.	4th	
1948–49	4	1ª Reg.	10th	
1949–50	4	1ª Reg.	11th	
1950–51	5	2ª Reg.		
1951–52	5	2ª Reg.		
1952–53	4	1ª Reg.	14th	
1953–54	6	3ª Reg.		

Season	Level	Division	Place	Copa del Rey
1954–55	6	3ª Reg.		
1955–56	6	3ª Reg.		
1956–57	6	3ª Reg.		
1957–58	6	3ª Reg.		
1958–59	5	2ª Reg.	4th	
1959–60	5	2ª Reg.	12th	
1960–61	5	2ª Reg.	14th	
1961–62	5	2ª Reg.	1st	
1962–63	4	1ª Reg.	4th	
1963–64	4	1ª Reg.	10th	
1964–65	4	1ª Reg.	9th	
1965–66	4	1ª Reg.	13th	
1966–67	4	1ª Reg.	8th	
1967–68	4	1ª Reg.	9th	
1968–69	4	1ª Reg.	15th	
1969–70	4	1ª Reg.	19th	
1970–71	5	2ª Reg.	2nd	
1971–72	5	2ª Reg.	10th	
1972–73	5	2ª Reg.	1st	
1973–74	5	2ª Reg. P.	13th	

Season	Level	Division	Place	Copa del Rey
1974–75	5	2ª Reg. P.	20th	
1975–76	6	2ª Reg.	3rd	
1976–77	6	2ª Reg.	2nd	
1977–78	6	2ª Reg. P.	8th	
1978–79	6	1ª Reg.	12th	
1979–80	6	1ª Reg.	7th	
1980–81	6	1ª Reg.	7th	
1981–82	6	1ª Reg.	18th	
1982–83	7	2ª Reg.	5th	
1983–84	7	2ª Reg.	11th	
1984–85	7	2ª Reg.	2nd	
1985–86	7	2ª Reg.	1st	
1986–87	6	1ª Reg.	2nd	
1987–88	5	Reg. Pref.	11th	
1988–89	5	Reg. Pref.	9th	
1989–90	5	Reg. Pref.	4th	
1990–91	4	3ª	10th	
1991–92	4	3ª	1st	
1992–93	4	3ª	2nd	Second round
1993–94	4	3ª	3rd	Second round

Season	Level	Division	Place	Copa del Rey
1994–95	4	3ª	3rd	
1995–96	4	3ª	8th	
1996–97	4	3ª	4th	
1997–98	4	3ª	1st	
1998–99	3	2ª B	20th	First round
1999–2000	4	3ª	1st	
2000–01	4	3ª	4th	Preliminary
2001–02	4	3ª	11th	
2002–03	4	3ª	6th	
2003–04	4	3ª	7th	
2004–05	4	3ª	12th	
2005–06	4	3ª	4th	
2006–07	4	3ª	2nd	
2007–08	4	3ª	8th	
2008–09	4	3ª	10th	
2009–10	4	3ª	10th	
2010–11	4	3ª	12th	
2011–12	4	3ª	14th	
2012–13	4	3ª	6th	
2013–14	4	3ª	1st	

Season	Level	Division	Place	Copa del Rey
2014–15	3	2ª B	15th	Second round
2015–16	3	2ª B	10th	
2016–17	3	2ª B	10th	
2017–18	3	2ª B	18th	
2018–19	4	3ª	1st	
2019–20	4	3ª	1st	First round
2020–21	3	2ª B	8th / 5th	First round
2021–22	5	3ª RFEF	3rd	
2022–23	5	3ª Fed.	7th	
2023–24	5	3ª Fed.	3rd	
2024–25	5	3ª Fed.	5th	
2025–26	4	2ª Fed.	17th	
2026–27	5	3ª Fed.		

- 5 seasons in Segunda División B
- 1 season in Segunda Federación
- 25 seasons in Tercera División
- 5 seasons in Tercera Federación/Tercera División RFEF

== Current squad ==
As of 6 February 2026

Note: Flags indicate national team as defined under FIFA eligibility rules; some limited exceptions apply. Players may hold more than one non-FIFA nationality.

No.	Pos.	Nation	Player
1	GK	ESP	Juan Junquera
2	DF	ESP	Mateo González
3	DF	ESP	Álvaro García
4	DF	ESP	Omar Hernández
5	DF	ESP	Jesús Palomeque
6	MF	ESP	Marcos Blanco
7	FW	ESP	Nico Pereira
8	MF	ESP	Mateo Arellano
9	FW	ESP	Miguel Sazatornil
10	MF	ESP	Jaime Felgueroso
11	MF	ESP	Luisen Piedralba
13	GK	ESP	Enol Muñiz
14	DF	ESP	Enol González

No.	Pos.	Nation	Player
15	DF	ESP	Riki Menéndez
16	DF	ESP	Ricardo Pesquera
17	FW	ESP	Samuel Montes
18	DF	ESP	David Argüelles
19	FW	ESP	Samuel Yerpes
20	MF	GHA	Stephen Buer
21	DF	ESP	Pelayo Santoveña
22	FW	ESP	Nacho Estrada
23	MF	FRA	Babafemo Fofana
24	DF	SEN	Ambo Cissé
25	MF	ESP	Carlos Cid
—	MF	ESP	Isaac Sánchez
—	FW	ESP	Óscar Molina

== Honours ==
- Tercera División: (6) 1991–92, 1997–98, 1999–2000, 2013–14, 2018–19, 2019-20
- Copa Federación de España (Asturias tournament): (1) 2018

== Notable players ==
- (Spain) Fernando Tocornal
- (Spain) Paco Fernández
- (Spain) Alejandro 'Caco' Morán
- (Spain) José Manuel 'Sietes' Suárez
- (Spain) Javi Castaño
- (Spain) Saúl Berjón
- (Spain) Rubén Uría
- (Spain) Miguel Vigón
- (Spain) Pedrín Menéndez

== Notable coaches ==
- (Spain) Josu Uribe
- (Spain) Marcelino García
- (Spain) José Antonio 'Pocholo' Fernández
- (Equatorial Guinea) Nené Ballina
- (Spain) Paco Fernández
- (Spain) Ricardo Bango
- (Spain) Javi Rozada
- (Spain) Samu Baños
